= 1987 NCAA Division I baseball season =

Baseball season

- Number of teams: 270

NCAA tournament

College World Series
- Champions: Stanford (1st title)
- Runners-up: Oklahoma State (15th CWS Appearance)
- Winning coach: Mark Marquess (1st title)
- MOP: Paul Carey (Stanford)

Seasons
- ← 1986 1988 →

The 1987 NCAA Division I baseball season, play of college baseball in the United States organized by the National Collegiate Athletic Association (NCAA) began in the spring of 1987. The season progressed through the regular season and concluded with the 1987 College World Series. The College World Series, held for the forty first time in 1987, consisted of one team from each of eight regional competitions and was held in Omaha, Nebraska, at Johnny Rosenblatt Stadium as a double-elimination tournament. Stanford claimed the championship for the first time.

== Realignment ==
- American discontinued their baseball program, leaving the Colonial Athletic Association with six schools sponsoring baseball.

== Conference winners ==
This is a partial list of conference champions from the 1987 season. The NCAA sponsored regional competitions to determine the College World Series participants. Each of the eight regionals consisted of six teams competing in double-elimination tournaments, with the winners advancing to Omaha. 26 teams earned automatic bids by winning their conference championship while 22 teams earned at-large selections.

Conference	Regular season winner	Conference tournament	Tournament venue • city	Tournament winner
Atlantic Coast Conference	Georgia Tech	1987 Atlantic Coast Conference baseball tournament	Greenville Municipal Stadium • Greenville, SC	Georgia Tech
Atlantic 10 Conference	East - Rutgers; West Virginia	1987 Atlantic 10 Conference baseball tournament	Bear Stadium • Boyertown, PA	West Virginia
Big East Conference	North - St. John's; South - Seton Hall	1987 Big East Conference baseball tournament	Muzzy Field • Bristol, CT	Seton Hall
Big Eight Conference	Oklahoma State	1987 Big Eight Conference baseball tournament	All Sports Stadium • Oklahoma City, OK	Oklahoma State
Big South Conference	East - Campbell; West - Armstrong State	1987 Big South Conference baseball tournament	Taylor Field • Buies Creek, NC	Winthrop
Big Ten Conference	East - Michigan; West - Minnesota	1987 Big Ten Conference baseball tournament	Ray Fisher Stadium • Ann Arbor, MI	Michigan
Colonial Athletic Association	UNC Wilmington	1987 Colonial Athletic Association baseball tournament	The Diamond • Richmond, VA	East Carolina
EIBL	Dartmouth	No tournament		
Mid-American Conference	Central Michigan	No tournament		
Midwestern Collegiate Conference	North - Xavier; South - Oral Roberts	1987 Midwestern Collegiate Conference baseball tournament	Evansville, IN	Oral Roberts
Metro Conference	South Carolina	1987 Metro Conference baseball tournament	Sarge Frye Field • Columbia, SC	Florida State
Mid-Continent Conference	Blue - Valparaiso; Gray - Eastern Illinois	1987 Mid-Continent Conference baseball tournament	Chicago, IL	Southwest Missouri State
Pacific-10 Conference	North - Washington State; South - Stanford	No tournament		
Pacific Coast Athletic Association	Cal State Fullerton	No tournament		
Southeastern Conference	Georgia	1987 Southeastern Conference baseball tournament	Foley Field • Athens, GA	Mississippi State
Southern Conference	North - Appalachian State; South - Western Carolina	1987 Southern Conference baseball tournament	Asheville, NC	Western Carolina
Southwest Conference	Texas	1987 Southwest Conference baseball tournament	Disch–Falk Field • Austin, TX	Texas
Trans America Athletic Conference	East - Georgia Southern; West - Hardin–Simmons	1987 Trans America Athletic Conference baseball tournament	J. I. Clements Stadium • Statesboro, GA	Georgia Southern

== Conference standings ==
The following is an incomplete list of conference standings:

1987 Association of Mid-Continent Universities baseball standings
	Conf.						Overall
Team	W		L		T	PCT	W		L		T	PCT
Blue Division
Valparaiso ^{x}‍‍‍	8	–	4	–	0	.667	31	–	23	–	2	.571
Cleveland State ‍‍‍	5	–	5	–	0	.500	20	–	17	–	2	.538
UIC ‍‍‍	3	–	7	–	0	.300	23	–	27	–	0	.460
Gray Division
Eastern Illinois ^{x}‍‍‍	9	–	3	–	0	.750	31	–	22	–	1	.583
Southwest Missouri State ‍‍‡‍^{y}	7	–	3	–	0	.700	38	–	14	–	0	.731
Western Illinois ‍‍‍	3	–	7	–	0	.300	20	–	18	–	0	.526
Northern Iowa ‍‍‍	3	–	9	–	0	.250	26	–	21	–	0	.553
‡ – Tournament champion y – Invited to the NCAA tournament As of June 30, 1987; Rankings from Collegiate Baseball

1987 Atlantic 10 Conference baseball standings
	Conf.						Overall
Team	W		L		T	PCT	W		L		T	PCT
East
Rutgers ^{x}‍‍‍	11	–	4	–	1	.719	36	–	14	–	1	.716
UMass ‍‍‍	10	–	4	–	0	.714	22	–	16	–	0	.579
Temple ‍‍‍	10	–	5	–	1	.656	26	–	20	–	1	.564
Rhode Island ‍‍‍	4	–	10	–	0	.286	9	–	22	–	0	.290
Saint Joseph's ‍‍‍	2	–	14	–	0	.125	9	–	26	–	0	.257
West
West Virginia ^{x}‍‍‡‍^{y}	9	–	2	–	0	.818	24	–	14	–	1	.628
Penn State ‍‍‍	11	–	3	–	0	.786	29	–	19	–	0	.604
George Washington ‍‍‍	8	–	8	–	0	.500	19	–	25	–	0	.432
St. Bonaventure ‍‍‍	4	–	10	–	0	.286	11	–	18	–	0	.379
Duquesne ‍‍‍	2	–	14	–	0	.125	19	–	17	–	0	.528
x – Division champion ‡ – Tournament champion y – Invited to the NCAA tournament As of June 30, 1987; Rankings from Collegiate Baseball

1987 Atlantic Coast Conference baseball standings
	Conf.						Overall
Team	W		L		T	PCT	W		L		T	PCT
No. 25 Georgia Tech ‍†‍‡‍^{y}	17	–	4	–	0	.810	51	–	14	–	0	.785
No. 10 Clemson ‍‍‍^{y}	16	–	5	–	0	.762	54	–	14	–	1	.790
North Carolina ‍‍‍	13	–	7	–	0	.650	31	–	22	–	0	.585
NC State ‍‍‍^{y}	12	–	8	–	0	.600	39	–	16	–	0	.709
Virginia ‍‍‍	5	–	12	–	0	.294	18	–	30	–	0	.375
Maryland ‍‍‍	5	–	12	–	0	.294	15	–	24	–	0	.385
Wake Forest ‍‍‍	4	–	13	–	0	.235	19	–	31	–	0	.380
Duke ‍‍‍	3	–	14	–	0	.176	18	–	26	–	0	.409
† – Conference champion ‡ – Tournament champion y – Invited to the NCAA tournament As of June 30, 1987; Rankings from Collegiate Baseball

1987 Big East Conference baseball standings
	Conf.				Overall
Team	W		L	PCT	W		L	PCT
North Division
St. John's ^{x}‍‍‍	12	–	6	.667	24	–	21	.533
Connecticut ‍‍‍	11	–	7	.611	23	–	16	.590
Boston College ‍‍‍	8	–	10	.444	13	–	21	.382
Providence ‍‍‍	5	–	13	.278	15	–	25	.375
South Division
No. 22 Seton Hall ^{x}‍‍‡‍^{y}	16	–	2	.889	45	–	10	.818
Villanova ‍‍‍	11	–	7	.611	35	–	18	.660
Pittsburgh ‍‍‍	5	–	13	.278	13	–	18	.419
Georgetown ‍‍‍	4	–	14	.222	14	–	30	.318
x – Division champion ‡ – Tournament champion y – Invited to the NCAA tournament As of June 30, 1987; Rankings from Collegiate Baseball

1987 Big Eight Conference baseball standings
	Conf.				Overall
Team	W		L	PCT	W		L	PCT
No. 2 Oklahoma State ^{†‡y} ‍‍‍	15	–	6	.714	59	–	13	.819
No. 26 Oklahoma ‍‍‍^{y}	17	–	7	.708	42	–	20	.677
Nebraska ‍‍‍	12	–	8	.600	36	–	21	.632
Missouri ‍‍‍	14	–	10	.583	36	–	26	.581
Kansas State ‍‍‍	9	–	12	.429	28	–	24	.538
Iowa State ‍‍‍	7	–	13	.350	25	–	27	.481
Kansas ‍‍‍	3	–	21	.125	15	–	39	.278
† – Conference champion ‡ – Tournament champion y – Invited to the NCAA tournament As of June 30, 1987; Rankings from Collegiate Baseball

1987 Big South Conference baseball standings
	Conf.						Overall
Team	W		L		T	PCT	W		L		T	PCT
East
Campbell ^{x}‍‍‍	8	–	2	–	0	.800	25	–	20	–	0	.556
Winthrop ‍‍‡‍	8	–	3	–	0	.727	38	–	8	–	0	.826
UNC Asheville ‍‍‍	3	–	5	–	0	.375	12	–	20	–	1	.379
Radford ‍‍‍	0	–	9	–	0	.000	11	–	21	–	0	.344
West
Armstrong State ^{x}‍‍‍	9	–	3	–	0	.750	47	–	15	–	0	.758
Coastal Carolina ‍‍‍	7	–	6	–	0	.538	27	–	23	–	0	.540
Augusta State ‍‍‍	6	–	7	–	0	.462	20	–	23	–	0	.465
Baptist ‍‍‍	3	–	9	–	0	.250	25	–	17	–	0	.595
x – Division champion ‡ – Tournament champion As of June 30, 1987; Rankings from Collegiate Baseball

1987 Big Ten Conference baseball standings
	Conf.				Overall
Team	W		L	PCT	W		L	PCT
East
No. 23 Michigan ^{x}‍‍‡‍^{y}	13	–	3	.813	52	–	12	.813
Purdue ‍‍‍^{y}	10	–	6	.625	36	–	24	.600
Indiana ‍‍‍	7	–	9	.438	43	–	17	.717
Michigan State ‍‍‍	6	–	10	.375	34	–	20	.630
Ohio State ‍‍‍	4	–	12	.250	19	–	27	.413
West
Minnesota ^{x}‍‍‍	12	–	4	.750	36	–	25	.590
Iowa ‍‍‍	9	–	7	.563	29	–	28	.509
Illinois ‍‍‍	9	–	7	.563	32	–	24	.571
Northwestern ‍‍‍	5	–	11	.313	23	–	20	.535
Wisconsin ‍‍‍	5	–	11	.313	28	–	24	.538
x – Division champion ‡ – Tournament champion y – Invited to the NCAA tournament As of June 30, 1987; Rankings from Collegiate Baseball

1987 Colonial Athletic Association baseball standings
	Conf.				Overall
Team	W		L	PCT	W		L	PCT
UNC Wilmington ‍†‍‍	11	–	4	.733	32	–	21	.604
Richmond ‍‍‍	10	–	5	.667	21	–	35	.375
George Mason ‍‍‍	9	–	6	.600	31	–	23	.574
East Carolina ‍‍‡‍^{y}	8	–	7	.533	26	–	17	.605
James Madison ‍‍‍	6	–	9	.400	28	–	21	.571
William & Mary ‍‍‍	1	–	14	.067	5	–	31	.139
† – Conference champion ‡ – Tournament champion y – Invited to the NCAA tournament As of June 30, 1987; Rankings from Collegiate Baseball

1987 Metro Conference baseball standings
	Conf.				Overall
Team	W		L	PCT	W		L	PCT
South Carolina ‍‍‍	13	–	1	.929	39	–	14	.736
No. 6 Florida State ‍‍‡‍^{y}	9	–	3	.750	55	–	18	.753
Virginia Tech ‍‍‍	9	–	5	.643	32	–	16	.667
Memphis State ‍‍‍	9	–	9	.500	33	–	23	.589
Southern Miss ‍‍‍	7	–	11	.389	36	–	25	.590
Cincinnati ‍‍‍	5	–	8	.385	31	–	22	.585
Louisville ‍‍‍	1	–	14	.067	12	–	36	.250
‡ – Tournament champion y – Invited to the NCAA tournament As of June 30, 1987; Rankings from Collegiate Baseball

1987 Midwestern Collegiate Conference baseball standings
	Conf.				Overall
Team	W		L	PCT	W		L	PCT
North
Xavier ^{x}‍‍‍	10	–	4	.714	32	–	21	.604
Detroit ‍‍‍	5	–	6	.455	30	–	29	.508
Dayton ‍‍‍	1	–	7	.125	11	–	21	.344
South
No. 11 Oral Roberts ^{x}‍‍‡‍^{y}	8	–	0	1.000	48	–	19	.716
Evansville ‍‍‍	4	–	4	.500	29	–	30	.492
Saint Louis ‍‍‍	0	–	8	.000	7	–	40	.149
x – Division champion ‡ – Tournament champion y – Invited to the NCAA Tournament; As of June 30, 1987; Rankings from Collegiate Baseball

1987 Pacific-10 Conference baseball standings
	Conf.				Overall
Team	W		L	PCT	W		L	PCT
Northern
No. 18 Washington State ^{x}‍‍‍^{y}	18	–	6	.750	44	–	19	.698
Oregon State ‍‍‍	15	–	9	.625	31	–	15	.674
Portland State ‍‍‍	13	–	11	.542	37	–	20	.649
Portland ‍‍‍	12	–	12	.500	30	–	22	.577
Washington ‍‍‍	11	–	13	.458	21	–	20	.512
Gonzaga ‍‍‍	8	–	16	.333	20	–	32	.385
Eastern Washington ‍‍‍	7	–	17	.292	24	–	32	.429
Southern
No. 1 Stanford ^{x}‍‍‍^{y}	21	–	9	.700	53	–	17	.757
No. 12 UCLA ‍‍‍^{y}	16	–	14	.533	40	–	25	.615
No. 8 Arizona State ‍‍‍^{y}	16	–	14	.533	40	–	27	.597
Arizona ‍‍‍^{y}	13	–	17	.433	34	–	26	.567
California ‍‍‍	12	–	18	.400	36	–	25	.590
Southern California ‍‍‍	12	–	18	.400	32	–	28	.533
x – Division champion y – Invited to the NCAA tournament As of June 30, 1987; Rankings from Collegiate Baseball

1987 Southeastern Conference baseball standings
	Conf.				Overall
Team	W		L	PCT	W		L	PCT
No. 7 Georgia ‍†‍‍^{y}	18	–	8	.692	42	–	21	.667
No. 20 Auburn ‍‍‍^{y}	18	–	9	.667	42	–	18	.700
Florida ‍‍‍	17	–	9	.654	32	–	24	.571
Kentucky ‍‍‍	16	–	11	.593	40	–	15	.727
No. 4 LSU ‍‍‍^{y}	12	–	10	.545	49	–	19	.721
Mississippi State ‍‍‡‍^{y}	13	–	13	.500	39	–	22	.639
Alabama ‍‍‍	11	–	14	.440	25	–	26	.490
Ole Miss ‍‍‍	11	–	16	.407	25	–	26	.490
Vanderbilt ‍‍‍	7	–	20	.259	27	–	25	.519
Tennessee ‍‍‍	5	–	18	.217	17	–	27	.386
† – Conference champion ‡ – Tournament champion y – Invited to the NCAA tournament As of June 30, 1987; Rankings from Collegiate Baseball

1987 Southern Conference baseball standings
	Conf.				Overall
Team	W		L	PCT	W		L	PCT
Northern
Appalachian State ^{x}‍‍‍	10	–	2	.833	26	–	13	.667
VMI ‍‍‍	8	–	4	.667	16	–	16	.500
Marshall ‍‍‍	5	–	7	.417	16	–	17	.485
East Tennessee State ‍‍‍	1	–	11	.083	9	–	19	.321
Southern
No. 30 Western Carolina ^{x}‍‍‡‍^{y}	13	–	3	.813	36	–	20	.643
Davidson ‍‍‍	10	–	7	.588	25	–	17	.595
The Citadel ‍‍‍	6	–	12	.333	19	–	31	.380
Furman ‍‍‍	5	–	12	.294	11	–	26	.297
x – Division champion ‡ – SoCon Tournament champion y – Invited to the NCAA tournament As of June 30, 1987; Rankings from Collegiate Baseball

1987 Southwest Conference baseball standings
	Conf.				Overall
Team	W		L	PCT	W		L	PCT
No. 3 Texas ‍†‍‡‍^{y}	18	–	3	.857	61	–	11	.847
No. 5 Arkansas ‍‍‍^{y}	17	–	4	.810	51	–	16	.761
No. 13 Texas A&M ‍‍‍^{y}	14	–	7	.667	44	–	22	.667
No. 14 Houston ‍‍‍^{y}	11	–	10	.524	40	–	24	.625
Baylor ‍‍‍	9	–	12	.429	38	–	15	.717
Texas Tech ‍‍‍	7	–	14	.333	21	–	28	.429
Rice ‍‍‍	5	–	16	.238	23	–	23	.500
TCU ‍‍‍	4	–	17	.190	24	–	35	.407
† – Conference champion ‡ – Tournament champion y – Invited to the NCAA tournament As of June 30, 1987; Rankings from Collegiate Baseball

1987 Trans America Athletic Conference baseball standings
	Conf.				Overall
Team	W		L	PCT	W		L	PCT
East
No. 29 Georgia Southern ^{x}‍†‍‡‍^{y}	13	–	5	.722	33	–	30	.524
Stetson ‍‍‍	12	–	6	.667	37	–	22	.627
Mercer ‍‍‍	6	–	9	.400	27	–	22	.551
Samford ‍‍‍	2	–	13	.133	6	–	41	.128
West
Hardin–Simmons ^{x}‍‍‍	10	–	6	.625	27	–	31	.466
Arkansas–Little Rock ‍‍‍	9	–	7	.563	25	–	20	.556
Centenary ‍‍‍	5	–	11	.313	19	–	25	.432
x – Division champion † – Conference champion ‡ – Tournament champion y – Invited to the NCAA tournament As of June 30, 1987; Rankings from Collegiate Baseball

== College World Series ==
The 1987 season marked the forty first NCAA baseball tournament, which culminated with the eight team College World Series. The College World Series was held in Omaha, Nebraska. The eight teams played a double-elimination format, with Stanford claiming their first championship with a 9–5 win over Oklahoma State in the final.

Upper round 1
Oklahoma State	8
Arizona State	3
LSU	6^{10}
Florida State	2
Texas	13
Arkansas	6
Stanford	3
Georgia	2

Upper round 2
Oklahoma State	8
LSU	7
Texas	1
Stanford	6
Lower round 1
Arizona State	0
Florida State	3
Arkansas	5
Georgia	4

Upper final
Oklahoma State	6
Stanford	2
Lower round 2
Texas	6^{10}
Florida State	4
LSU	5
Arkansas	2

Semifinals
Oklahoma State	5
Texas	6
Stanford	6^{10}
LSU	5

Preliminary final
Texas	3
Stanford	9

Final
Oklahoma State	5
Stanford	9
