= 1987 Stanford Cardinal baseball team =

American college baseball season

1987 Stanford Cardinal baseball

National champions Pac-10 Southern Division champions
- Conference: Pacific-10 Conference
- CB: No. 1
- Record: 53-17 (21–9 Pac-10)
- Head coach: Mark Marquess (11th year)
- Home stadium: Sunken Diamond

1987 Pacific-10 Conference baseball standings
	Conf.				Overall
Team	W		L	PCT	W		L	PCT
Northern
No. 18 Washington State ^{x}‍‍‍^{y}	18	–	6	.750	44	–	19	.698
Oregon State ‍‍‍	15	–	9	.625	31	–	15	.674
Portland State ‍‍‍	13	–	11	.542	37	–	20	.649
Portland ‍‍‍	12	–	12	.500	30	–	22	.577
Washington ‍‍‍	11	–	13	.458	21	–	20	.512
Gonzaga ‍‍‍	8	–	16	.333	20	–	32	.385
Eastern Washington ‍‍‍	7	–	17	.292	24	–	32	.429
Southern
No. 1 Stanford ^{x}‍‍‍^{y}	21	–	9	.700	53	–	17	.757
No. 12 UCLA ‍‍‍^{y}	16	–	14	.533	40	–	25	.615
No. 8 Arizona State ‍‍‍^{y}	16	–	14	.533	40	–	27	.597
Arizona ‍‍‍^{y}	13	–	17	.433	34	–	26	.567
California ‍‍‍	12	–	18	.400	36	–	25	.590
Southern California ‍‍‍	12	–	18	.400	32	–	28	.533
x – Division champion y – Invited to the NCAA tournament As of June 30, 1987; Rankings from Collegiate Baseball

The 1987 Stanford Cardinal baseball team represented Stanford University in the 1987 NCAA Division I baseball season. The team was led by head coach Mark Marquess in his 11th season at Stanford.

The Cardinal won the NCAA tournament: College World Series, defeating the Oklahoma State in the championship game.

== Roster ==
1987 Stanford Cardinal roster
Pitchers: Steve Chitren; Brian Keyser; Jack McDowell; Al Osuna; Lee Plemel; Jim Price; Dave Reis; Rob Wassenaar	Infielders: Frank Carey; David Esquer; Mark Machtolf; Sean Kirk; Jeff Saenger; Ed Sprague Jr.; Ron Witmeyer	Outfielders: Rubén Amaro Jr.; Paul Carey; Toi Cook; Eric DeGraw; Catchers: Eric Cox; Doug Robbins

== Schedule ==
1987 Stanford Cardinal baseball game log
Regular season
January/February

Date	Opponent	Score	Overall record	Pac-10 record
January 23	at San Jose State	1-2	0-1	–
January 26	at San Jose State	7-1	1-1	–
February 1	Santa Clara	6-2	2-1	–
February 4	at Pacific	13-2	3-1	–
February 6	at Cal State Fullerton	6-5	4-1	–
February 7	at Cal State Fullerton	4-7	4-2	–
February 8	at Cal State Fullerton	11-1	5-2	–
February 11	San Francisco State	13-6	6-2	–
February 14	at Fresno State	2-0	7-2	–
February 15	at Fresno State	2-4	7-3	–
February 16	at Fresno State	4-12	7-4	–
February 17	at UC Davis	10-1	8-4	–
February 20	at UC Santa Barbara	2-10	8-5	–
February 21	at UC Santa Barbara	8-6	9-5	–
February 22	at UC Santa Barbara	9-10	9-6	–
February 23	Santa Clara	10-6	10-6	–
February 24	Pacific	10-2	11-6	–
February 27	at UCLA	9-17	11-7	0–1
February 28	at UCLA	5-14	11-8	0–2

March

Date	Opponent	Score	Overall record	Pac-10 record
March 1	at UCLA	13-5	12-8	1–2
March 3	San Francisco	7-0	13-8	–
March 6	Arizona	14-4	14-8	2–2
March 7	Arizona	10-6	15-8	3–2
March 8	Arizona	8-6	16-8	4–2
March 22	at California	7-6	17-8	5–2
March 23	San Jose State	5-3	18-8	–
March 24	at Cal State Hayward	14-3	19-8	–
March 27	Arizona State	10-3	20-8	6–2
March 28	Arizona State	3-2	21-8	7–2
March 29	Arizona State	12-6	22-8	8–2
March 30	UNLV	3-10	22-9	–
March 31	Saint Mary's	10-0	23-9	–

April

Date	Opponent	Score	Overall record	Pac-10 record
April 3	at Southern California	4-0	24-9	9–2
April 4	at Southern California	9-4	25-9	10–2
April 5	at Southern California	1-3	25-10	10–3
April 7	at Santa Clara	7-4	26-10	–
April 10	UCLA	6-14	26-11	10–3
April 11	UCLA	3-2	27-11	11–3
April 12	UCLA	8-6	28-11	12–3
April 14	at San Francisco	18-6	29-11	–
April 16	at Arizona	5-10	29-12	12–4
April 17	at Arizona	12-3	30-12	13–4
April 18	at Arizona	14-11	31-12	14–4
April 20	California	6-1	32-12	15–4
April 21	at San Jose State	7-5	33-12	–
April 24	at Arizona State	6-10	33-13	15–5
April 25	at Arizona State	13-5	34-13	16–5
April 26	at Arizona State	2-5	34-14	16–6
April 28	Stanislaus State	3-2	35-14	–
April 29	at Santa Clara	21-7	36-14	–

May

Date	Opponent	Score	Overall record	Pac-10 record
May 3	Santa Clara	19-2	37-14	–
May 4	Sacramento State	11-3	38-14	–
May 5	at Saint Mary's	5-4	39-14	–
May 7	at California	9-19	39-15	16–7
May 8	California	7-6	40-15	17–7
May 9	at California	6-7	40-16	17–8
May 10	California	11-4	41-16	18–8
May 15	Southern California	3-1	42-16	19–9
May 16	Southern California	4-3	43-16	20–9
May 17	Southern California	10-7	44-16	21–9

NCAA tournament: West I Regional

Date	Opponent	Score	Overall record
May 22	vs. Minnesota	12-1	45-16
May 23	vs. UC Santa Barbara	12-5	46-16
May 24	vs. Washington State	12-11	47-16
May 25	vs. Oral Roberts	9-4	48-16

NCAA tournament: College World Series

Date	Opponent	Site/stadium	Score	Overall record
May 31	vs. Georgia	Rosenblatt Stadium	3-2	49-16
June 2	vs. Texas	Rosenblatt Stadium	6-1	50-16
June 4	vs. Oklahoma State	Rosenblatt Stadium	2-6	50-17
June 5	vs. LSU	Rosenblatt Stadium	6-5	51-17
June 6	vs. Texas	Rosenblatt Stadium	9-3	52-17
June 7	vs. Oklahoma State	Rosenblatt Stadium	9-5	53-17

== Awards and honors ==
Rubén Amaro

- First Team All-American
- First Team All-Pac-10

Steve Chitren

- First Team All-Pac-10

Paul Carey

- College World Series Most Outstanding Player
- NCAA Freshman of the Year

David Esquer

- College World Series All-Tournament Team

Mark Machtolf

- College World Series All-Tournament Team

Jack McDowell

- First Team All-American
- First Team All-Pac-10

Ed Sprague

- First Team All-Pac-10

== Cardinal in the 1987 MLB draft ==
The following members of the 1987 Stanford Cardinal baseball team were drafted in the 1987 Major League Baseball draft.

Player	Position	Round	Overall	MLB team
Jack McDowell	RHP	1st	5th	Chicago White Sox
Rubén Amaro	OF	11th	291st	California Angels
Al Osuna	LHP	16th	418th	Houston Astros
Rob Wassenaar	RHP	21st	551st	California Angels
David Esquer	SS	31st	793rd	Baltimore Orioles
Toi Cook	OF	38th	960th	Minnesota Twins
