= 1987 Colonial Athletic Association baseball tournament =

American college baseball tournament

- Teams: 6
- Format: Double-elimination tournament
- Finals site: The Diamond; Richmond, Virginia
- Champions: East Carolina (1st title)
- Winning coach: Gary Overton (1st title)
- MVP: Gary Smith (Richmond)

1987 Colonial Athletic Association baseball standings
| | Conf. | | | | Overall |
| Team | W | | L | PCT | W | | L | PCT |
|---|---|---|---|---|---|---|---|---|
| UNC Wilmington ‍†‍‍ | 11 | – | 4 | .733 | 32 | – | 21 | .604 |
| Richmond ‍‍‍ | 10 | – | 5 | .667 | 21 | – | 35 | .375 |
| George Mason ‍‍‍ | 9 | – | 6 | .600 | 31 | – | 23 | .574 |
| East Carolina ‍‍‡‍^{y} | 8 | – | 7 | .533 | 26 | – | 17 | .605 |
| James Madison ‍‍‍ | 6 | – | 9 | .400 | 28 | – | 21 | .571 |
| William & Mary ‍‍‍ | 1 | – | 14 | .067 | 5 | – | 31 | .139 |
† – Conference champion ‡ – Tournament champion y – Invited to the NCAA tournament As of June 30, 1987; Rankings from Collegiate Baseball

The 1987 Colonial Athletic Association baseball tournament was held at The Diamond, home field of Richmond in Richmond, Virginia, from May 14 through 17. The event determined the champion of the Colonial Athletic Association for the 1987 season. The winner of the tournament, fourth-seeded East Carolina, earned the CAA's automatic bid to the 1987 NCAA Division I baseball tournament.

== Format and seeding ==
The CAA's six teams were seeded one to six based on winning percentage from the conference's round robin regular season. They played a double-elimination tournament with first round matchups of the top and bottom seeds, second and fifth seeds, and third and fourth seeds. The new format was a result of American discontinuing baseball, leaving the league with six teams.

| Team | W | L | Pct. | GB | Seed |
|---|---|---|---|---|---|
| UNC Wilmington | 11 | 4 | .733 | — | 1 |
| Richmond | 10 | 5 | .667 | 1 | 2 |
| George Mason | 9 | 6 | .600 | 2 | 3 |
| East Carolina | 8 | 7 | .533 | 3 | 4 |
| James Madison | 6 | 9 | .400 | 5 | 5 |
| William & Mary | 1 | 14 | .067 | 10 | 6 |

== Bracket and results ==
First round
1 | UNC Wilmington | 5
6 | William & Mary | 2
3 | George Mason | 3
4 | East Carolina | 5
2 | Richmond | 1
5 | James Madison | 6

Second round
1 | UNC Wilmington | 12
2 | Richmond | 6
4 | East Carolina | 2
5 | James Madison | 6
6 | William & Mary | 6
3 | George Mason | 7

Third round
1 | UNC Wilmington | 2
5 | James Madison | 5
4 | East Carolina | 8
6 | William & Mary | 4

Semifinals
1 | UNC Wilmington | 3
4 | East Carolina | 10

Final
5 | James Madison | 10 | 11
4 | East Carolina | 11^{11} | 14

== Most Valuable Player ==
Gary Smith was named Tournament Most Valuable Player. Smith was a pitcher for East Carolina.
