= 1987 Midwestern Collegiate Conference baseball tournament =

- Teams: 4
- Format: Double-elimination
- Finals site: Bosse Field; Evansville, Indiana
- Champions: Oral Roberts (6th title)
- Winning coach: Gary Vaught (1st title)

1987 Midwestern Collegiate Conference baseball standings
	Conf.				Overall
Team	W		L	PCT	W		L	PCT
North
Xavier ^{x}‍‍‍	10	–	4	.714	32	–	21	.604
Detroit ‍‍‍	5	–	6	.455	30	–	29	.508
Dayton ‍‍‍	1	–	7	.125	11	–	21	.344
South
No. 11 Oral Roberts ^{x}‍‍‡‍^{y}	8	–	0	1.000	48	–	19	.716
Evansville ‍‍‍	4	–	4	.500	29	–	30	.492
Saint Louis ‍‍‍	0	–	8	.000	7	–	40	.149
x – Division champion ‡ – Tournament champion y – Invited to the NCAA Tournament; As of June 30, 1987; Rankings from Collegiate Baseball

The 1987 Midwestern Collegiate Conference baseball tournament took place in May 1987, near the close of the 1987 NCAA Division I baseball season. The top two teams from each of the league's two divisions met in the double-elimination tournament held at Bosse Field home stadium of Evansville in Evansville, Indiana. South Division champion Oral Roberts won their sixth league championship. They Golden Eagles qualified for the 1987 NCAA Division I baseball tournament.

== Seeding and format ==
The top two finishers from each of the league's two divisions qualified for the tournament, using conference games only. The North Division winner played the runner-up in the South Division and vice versa in the first round.

Team	W	L	PCT	GB	Seed
North
Xavier	10	4	.714	—	1N
Detroit	5	6	.455	3.5	2N
Dayton	1	7	.125	6	—

Team	W	L	Pct.	GB	Seed
South
Oral Roberts	8	0	1.000	—	1S
Evansville	4	4	.500	4	2S
Saint Louis	0	8	.000	8	—

== Bracket and results ==
First round
1N	Xavier	2
2S	Evansville	6
Winner's bracket
1S	Oral Roberts	6
2N	Detroit	1
1N	Xavier	4
2N	Detroit	5
Loser's bracket

Semi-finals
2S	Evansville	0
1S	Oral Roberts	4
2N	Detroit	5
2S	Evansville	6

Finals
1S	Oral Roberts	7	7
2S	Evansville	8	2
