= 1987 Trans America Athletic Conference baseball tournament =

American college baseball tournament

- Teams: 2
- Format: Double-elimination
- Finals site: J. I. Clements Stadium; Statesboro, Georgia
- Champions: Georgia Southern (4th title)
- Winning coach: Jack Stallings (4th title)
- MVP: Brett Hendley (Georgia Southern)

1987 Trans America Athletic Conference baseball standings
	Conf.				Overall
Team	W		L	PCT	W		L	PCT
East
No. 29 Georgia Southern ^{x}‍†‍‡‍^{y}	13	–	5	.722	33	–	30	.524
Stetson ‍‍‍	12	–	6	.667	37	–	22	.627
Mercer ‍‍‍	6	–	9	.400	27	–	22	.551
Samford ‍‍‍	2	–	13	.133	6	–	41	.128
West
Hardin–Simmons ^{x}‍‍‍	10	–	6	.625	27	–	31	.466
Arkansas–Little Rock ‍‍‍	9	–	7	.563	25	–	20	.556
Centenary ‍‍‍	5	–	11	.313	19	–	25	.432
x – Division champion † – Conference champion ‡ – Tournament champion y – Invited to the NCAA tournament As of June 30, 1987; Rankings from Collegiate Baseball

The 1987 Trans America Athletic Conference baseball tournament was held at J. I. Clements Stadium on the campus of Georgia Southern in Statesboro, Georgia, from April 30 to May 2. This was the ninth tournament championship held by the Trans America Athletic Conference, in its ninth year of existence. Georgia Southern won their third tournament championship and earned the conference's automatic bid to the 1987 NCAA Division I baseball tournament.

== Format and seeding ==
The top two finishers from each division by conference winning percentage qualified for the tournament, with the top seed from one division playing the second seed from the opposite in the first round.

Team	W	L	Pct.	GB	Seed
East
Georgia Southern	13	5	.722	—	1E
Stetson	12	6	1	—	2E
Mercer	6	9	.400	5.5	—
Samford	2	13	.133	9.5	—

Team	W	L	Pct.	GB	Seed
West
Hardin–Simmons	10	6	.625	—	1W
Arkansas–Little Rock	9	7	.563	1	2W
Centenary	5	11	.313	5	—

== Bracket ==
First round
1E	Georgia Southern	10
2W	Arkansas–Little Rock	7
1W	Hardin–Simmons	4
2E	Stetson	16
Lower round 1
2W	Arkansas–Little Rock	9
1W	Hardin–Simmons	14

Semi-finals
1E	Georgia Southern	18
2E	Stetson	0
Lower final
2E	Stetson	10
1W	Hardin–Simmons	8

Finals
1E	Georgia Southern	8	—
2E	Stetson	6	—

== All-Tournament Team ==
The following players were named to the All-Tournament Team. No MVP was named until 1985.

POS	Player	School
P	Keith Richardson	Georgia Southern
P	Steve Woide	Stetson
C	Mike Robinson	Stetson
1B	Brett Hendley	Georgia Southern
2B	Shawn Lee	Stetson
SS	Jeff Shireman	Georgia Southern
3B	Scott Foith	Hardin–Simmons
OF	Mike Shepherd	Georgia Southern
OF	Frank Vashaw	Georgia Southern
OF	Lynn Turner	Hardin–Simmons
DH	Pat Harding	Stetson

=== Most Valuable Player ===
Brett Hendley was named Tournament Most Valuable Player. Hendley was a first baseman for Georgia Southern.
