= 1987 Big South Conference baseball tournament =

- Teams: 4
- Format: Double-elimination
- Finals site: Taylor Field; Buies Creek, North Carolina
- Champions: Winthrop (2nd title)
- Winning coach: Horace Turbeville (1st title)
- MVP: Mike Michener (Armstrong State)

1987 Big South Conference baseball standings
	Conf.						Overall
Team	W		L		T	PCT	W		L		T	PCT
East
Campbell ^{x}‍‍‍	8	–	2	–	0	.800	25	–	20	–	0	.556
Winthrop ‍‍‡‍	8	–	3	–	0	.727	38	–	8	–	0	.826
UNC Asheville ‍‍‍	3	–	5	–	0	.375	12	–	20	–	1	.379
Radford ‍‍‍	0	–	9	–	0	.000	11	–	21	–	0	.344
West
Armstrong State ^{x}‍‍‍	9	–	3	–	0	.750	47	–	15	–	0	.758
Coastal Carolina ‍‍‍	7	–	6	–	0	.538	27	–	23	–	0	.540
Augusta State ‍‍‍	6	–	7	–	0	.462	20	–	23	–	0	.465
Baptist ‍‍‍	3	–	9	–	0	.250	25	–	17	–	0	.595
x – Division champion ‡ – Tournament champion As of June 30, 1987; Rankings from Collegiate Baseball

The 1987 Big South Conference baseball tournament was the postseason baseball tournament for the Big South Conference, held from May 14 through 16 at Taylor Field on the campus of Campbell University in Buies Creek, North Carolina. Four teams participated in the double-elimination tournament. The Big South played the season at the NCAA Division I level, but did not receive an automatic bid to the 1987 NCAA Division I baseball tournament. Winthrop won the championship for the second time out of three years of the Tournament's existence.

== Format ==
The top four finishers from the regular season qualified for the tournament.

Team	W	L	Pct.	GB	Seed
East
Campbell	8	2	.800	—	1E
Winthrop	8	3	.727	.5	2E
UNC Asheville	3	5	.375	4	—
Radford	0	9	.000	7.5	—

Team	W	L	Pct.	GB	Seed
West
Armstrong State	9	3	.750	—	1W
Coastal Carolina	7	6	.538	2.5	2W
Augusta State	6	7	.462	3.5	—
Baptist	3	9	.250	6	—

== Bracket and results ==
First round
1E	Campbell	8
2W	Coastal Carolina	19
1W	Armstrong State	14
2E	Winthrop	8
Lower round 1
1E	Campbell	1
2E	Winthrop	8

Semi-finals
2W	Coastal Carolina	6
1W	Armstrong State	10
Lower final
2W	Coastal Carolina	7
2E	Winthrop	11

Finals
1W	Armstrong State	6	12
2E	Winthrop	12	13

== All-Tournament Team ==
Name	School
Charlie Broad	Armstrong State
Jeff Garbett	Winthrop
Scott Goins	Winthrop
Dana Harding	Armstrong State
Mark Hetrick	Winthrop
Jimmy Huestess	Winthrop
Art Inabinet	Winthrop
Jimmy Malseed	Winthrop
Mike Michener	Armstrong State
Dave Murray	Winthrop
Robert Tucker	Winthrop

=== Most Valuable Player ===
Mike Michener was named Tournament Most Valuable Player. Michener was an outfielder for Armstrong State.
