= 1987 Southeastern Conference baseball tournament =

- Teams: 6
- Format: Six-team double elimination tournament
- Finals site: Foley Field; Athens, Georgia
- Champions: Mississippi State (3rd title)
- Winning coach: Ron Polk (3rd title)
- MVP: Dan Paradoa (Mississippi State)
- Attendance: 5,091

1987 Southeastern Conference baseball standings
	Conf.				Overall
Team	W		L	PCT	W		L	PCT
No. 7 Georgia ‍†‍‍^{y}	18	–	8	.692	42	–	21	.667
No. 20 Auburn ‍‍‍^{y}	18	–	9	.667	42	–	18	.700
Florida ‍‍‍	17	–	9	.654	32	–	24	.571
Kentucky ‍‍‍	16	–	11	.593	40	–	15	.727
No. 4 LSU ‍‍‍^{y}	12	–	10	.545	49	–	19	.721
Mississippi State ‍‍‡‍^{y}	13	–	13	.500	39	–	22	.639
Alabama ‍‍‍	11	–	14	.440	25	–	26	.490
Ole Miss ‍‍‍	11	–	16	.407	25	–	26	.490
Vanderbilt ‍‍‍	7	–	20	.259	27	–	25	.519
Tennessee ‍‍‍	5	–	18	.217	17	–	27	.386
† – Conference champion ‡ – Tournament champion y – Invited to the NCAA tournament As of June 30, 1987; Rankings from Collegiate Baseball

The 1987 Southeastern Conference baseball tournament was held at Foley Field in Athens, Georgia, from May 14 through 17. Mississippi State won the tournament and earned the Southeastern Conference's automatic bid to the 1987 NCAA tournament.

== Regular season results ==
Team	W	L	Pct	GB	Seed
Georgia	18	8	.692	—	1
Auburn	18	9	.667	0.5	2
Florida	17	9	.654	1	3
Kentucky	16	11	.593	2.5	4
LSU	12	10	.545	4	5
Mississippi State	13	13	.500	5	6
Alabama	11	14	.440	6.5	—
Ole Miss	11	16	.407	7.5	—
Vanderbilt	7	20	.259	11.5	—
Tennessee	5	18	.217	11.5	—

== Tournament ==
First round
1	Georgia	5
6	Mississippi State	6
2	Auburn	9
5	LSU	8
3	Florida	4
4	Kentucky	5

Second round
6	Mississippi State	5
3	Florida	4
2	Auburn	5*
4	Kentucky	4*
1	Georgia	2
5	LSU	4

Third round
6	Mississippi State	4
2	Auburn	3
4	Kentucky	1
5	LSU	4

Semifinals
2	Auburn	2
5	LSU	4

Final
6	Mississippi State	13	—
5	LSU	3	—

- * indicates extra innings.

== All-Tournament Team ==
Position	Player	School
1B	John Mitchell	Mississippi State
2B	Terry Shumpert	Kentucky
3B	Kevin Henry	Auburn
SS	Dave Cunningham	LSU
C	Craig Faulkner	LSU
OF	Trey Gainous	Auburn
OF	Jody Hurst	Mississippi State
OF	Dan Paradoa	Mississippi State
DH	Richie Grayum	Mississippi State
P	Derek Lilliquist	Georgia
P	Terry Ellis	Mississippi State
MVP	Dan Paradoa	Mississippi State

== See also ==
- College World Series
- NCAA Division I Baseball Championship
- Southeastern Conference baseball tournament
