= 1987 Arizona Wildcats baseball team =

American college baseball season

1987 Arizona Wildcats baseball

West II Regional
- Conference: Pacific-10 Conference
- Record: 34–26 (13–17 Pac-10)
- Head coach: Jerry Kindall (15th season)
- Assistant coaches: Jerry Stitt (9th season); Jim Wing (15th season)
- Home stadium: Sancet Stadium

1987 Pacific-10 Conference baseball standings
| | Conf. | | | | Overall |
| Team | W | | L | PCT | W | | L | PCT |
|---|---|---|---|---|---|---|---|---|
Northern
| No. 18 Washington State ^{x}‍‍‍^{y} | 18 | – | 6 | .750 | 44 | – | 19 | .698 |
| Oregon State ‍‍‍ | 15 | – | 9 | .625 | 31 | – | 15 | .674 |
| Portland State ‍‍‍ | 13 | – | 11 | .542 | 37 | – | 20 | .649 |
| Portland ‍‍‍ | 12 | – | 12 | .500 | 30 | – | 22 | .577 |
| Washington ‍‍‍ | 11 | – | 13 | .458 | 21 | – | 20 | .512 |
| Gonzaga ‍‍‍ | 8 | – | 16 | .333 | 20 | – | 32 | .385 |
| Eastern Washington ‍‍‍ | 7 | – | 17 | .292 | 24 | – | 32 | .429 |
Southern
| No. 1 Stanford ^{x}‍‍‍^{y} | 21 | – | 9 | .700 | 53 | – | 17 | .757 |
| No. 12 UCLA ‍‍‍^{y} | 16 | – | 14 | .533 | 40 | – | 25 | .615 |
| No. 8 Arizona State ‍‍‍^{y} | 16 | – | 14 | .533 | 40 | – | 27 | .597 |
| Arizona ‍‍‍^{y} | 13 | – | 17 | .433 | 34 | – | 26 | .567 |
| California ‍‍‍ | 12 | – | 18 | .400 | 36 | – | 25 | .590 |
| Southern California ‍‍‍ | 12 | – | 18 | .400 | 32 | – | 28 | .533 |
x – Division champion y – Invited to the NCAA tournament As of June 30, 1987; Rankings from Collegiate Baseball

The 1987 Arizona Wildcats baseball team represented the University of Arizona during the 1987 NCAA Division I baseball season. The Wildcats played their home games at Frank Sancet Stadium. The team was coached by Jerry Kindall in his 15th season at Arizona. The Wildcats finished 34–26 overall and placed 4th in the Pacific-10's Southern Division with an 13–17 record. Arizona made a 3rd straight postseason appearance and was placed in the West II Regional hosted by rival Arizona State University at Packard Stadium in Tempe, Arizona. The Wildcats failed to make a 3rd straight College World Series appearance, losing their first 2 games to Pepperdine and Hawaii to end their season.

== Previous season ==
The Wildcats finished the 1986 season with a record of 49-19 and 18–12 in conference play, finishing tied for 2nd in the "Six-Pac" (Pac-10 Southern). Arizona advanced to the postseason for the 2nd straight season and was placed in the Central Regional hosted by the University of Texas at Disch-Falk Field in Austin, Texas. The Wildcats defeated San Diego State, Texas and Pepperdine to win the Regional and advance to the College World Series for the 2nd straight season (and 14th overall). In Omaha, Nebraska, the team defeated Maine, Loyola Marymount and Florida State to qualify for the finals before losing a game to Miami (FL). In the final game, Arizona defeated Florida State 10–2 to win their 3rd National Championship.

== Personnel ==
=== Roster ===
1987 Arizona Wildcats baseball roster
| • Gary Alexander • Glenn Baxley • David Blake • Greg Fowble • Wayne Gilles • Frank Halcovich | • Chip Hale • Gil Heredia • Jason Klonosky • Heath Lane • Sam Messina • David Miller • Shaun Murphy • Richard Schuman | • David Shermet • J.T. Snow • Steven Strong • Michael Thorell • Pat Waid • Alan Zinter |

=== Coaches ===
1987 Arizona Wildcats baseball coaching staff
- Jerry Kindall - Head coach
- Jerry Stitt - Assistant coach
- Jim Wing - Assistant coach

== 1987 Schedule and results ==
1987 Arizona Wildcats baseball game log
Regular season
| Date | Opponent | Site/Stadium | Score | Overall Record | Pac-10 Record |
|---|---|---|---|---|---|
| Jan 29 | UC Irvine | Sancet Stadium • Tucson, AZ | W 14–1 | 1-0 | |
| Jan 30 | UC Irvine | Sancet Stadium • Tucson, AZ | W 11–6 | 2-0 | |
| Jan 31 | UC Irvine | Sancet Stadium • Tucson, AZ | W 6–5 | 3-0 | |
| Feb 5 | at Grand Canyon | Brazell Stadium • Phoenix, AZ | W 8–2 | 4-0 | |
| Feb 6 | Grand Canyon | Sancet Stadium • Tucson, AZ | W 12–5 | 5-0 | |
| Feb 7 | Grand Canyon | Sancet Stadium • Tucson, AZ | W 11–3 | 6-0 | |
| Feb 9 | Cal State Dominguez Hills | Sancet Stadium • Tucson, AZ | W 13–3 | 7-0 | |
| Feb 10 | Cal State Dominguez Hills | Sancet Stadium • Tucson, AZ | W 9–6 | 8-0 | |
| Feb 12 | at Cal State Fullerton | Titan Field • Fullerton, CA | W 7–4 | 9-0 | |
| Feb 14 | at Cal State Fullerton | Titan Field • Fullerton, CA | L 6–7 | 9-1 | |
| Feb 14 | at Cal State Fullerton | Titan Field • Fullerton, CA | L 4–5 | 9-2 | |
| Feb 16 | Westmont | Sancet Stadium • Tucson, AZ | L 11–12 | 9-3 | |
| Feb 17 | Westmont | Sancet Stadium • Tucson, AZ | W 9–6 | 10-3 | |
| Feb 20 | at UCLA | Jackie Robinson Stadium • Los Angeles, CA | W 12–10 | 11-3 | 1-0 |
| Feb 21 | at UCLA | Jackie Robinson Stadium • Los Angeles, CA | L 5–6 | 11-4 | 1-1 |
| Feb 22 | at UCLA | Jackie Robinson Stadium • Los Angeles, CA | L 5–18 | 11-5 | 1-2 |
| Feb 27 | California | Sancet Stadium • Tucson, AZ | W 7–1 | 12-5 | 2-2 |
| Feb 28 | California | Sancet Stadium • Tucson, AZ | W 13–6 | 13-5 | 3-2 |
| Mar 1 | California | Sancet Stadium • Tucson, AZ | W 13–5 | 14-5 | 4-2 |
| Mar 6 | at Stanford | Sunken Diamond • Palo Alto, CA | L 4–14 | 14-6 | 4-3 |
| Mar 7 | at Stanford | Sunken Diamond • Palo Alto, CA | L 6–10 | 14-7 | 4-4 |
| Mar 8 | at Stanford | Sunken Diamond • Palo Alto, CA | L 6–8 | 14-8 | 4-5 |
| Mar 9 | Pace | Sancet Stadium • Tucson, AZ | W 19–2 | 15-8 | |
| Mar 10 | Pace | Sancet Stadium • Tucson, AZ | W 20–1 | 16-8 | |
| Mar 10 | Wyoming | Sancet Stadium • Tucson, AZ | W 10–2 | 17-8 | |
| Mar 13 | at USC | Dedeaux Field • Los Angeles, CA | W 13–6 | 18-8 | 5-5 |
| Mar 14 | at USC | Dedeaux Field • Los Angeles, CA | W 10–8 | 19-8 | 6-5 |
| Mar 15 | at USC | Dedeaux Field • Los Angeles, CA | L 3–4 | 19-9 | 6-6 |
| Mar 20 | Arizona State | Sancet Stadium • Tucson, AZ | L 5–8 | 19-10 | 6-7 |
| Mar 21 | Arizona State | Sancet Stadium • Tucson, AZ | L 2–10 | 19-11 | 6-8 |
| Mar 23 | Arizona State | Sancet Stadium • Tucson, AZ | L 4–15 | 19-12 | 6-9 |
| Mar 24 | Utah | Sancet Stadium • Tucson, AZ | W 12–1 | 20-12 | |
| Mar 24 | Linfield | Sancet Stadium • Tucson, AZ | W 4–1 | 21-12 | |
| Mar 27 | at Miami | Mark Light Field • Coral Gables, FL | W 5–0 | 22-12 | |
| Mar 28 | at Miami | Mark Light Field • Coral Gables, FL | L 3–7 | 22-13 | |
| Mar 29 | at Miami | Mark Light Field • Coral Gables, FL | L 8–9 | 22-14 | |
| Mar 30 | Minnesota | Sancet Stadium • Tucson, AZ | W 11–2 | 23-14 | |
| Mar 31 | Minnesota | Sancet Stadium • Tucson, AZ | W 6–4 | 24-14 | |
| Apr 1 | United States International | Sancet Stadium • Tucson, AZ | W 8–1 | 25-14 | |
| Apr 2 | United States International | Sancet Stadium • Tucson, AZ | W 2–1 | 26-14 | |
| Apr 3 | Loyola Marymount | Sancet Stadium • Tucson, AZ | W 10–7 | 27-14 | |
| Apr 4 | Loyola Marymount | Sancet Stadium • Tucson, AZ | L 7–15 | 27-15 | |
| Apr 5 | Loyola Marymount | Sancet Stadium • Tucson, AZ | L 11–16 | 27-16 | |
| Apr 10 | at California | Evans Diamond • Berkeley, CA | L 4–5 | 27-17 | 6-10 |
| Apr 11 | at California | Evans Diamond • Berkeley, CA | L 3–10 | 27-18 | 6-11 |
| Apr 12 | at California | Evans Diamond • Berkeley, CA | L 6–7 | 27-19 | 6-12 |
| Apr 16 | Stanford | Sancet Stadium • Tucson, AZ | W 10–5 | 28-19 | 7-12 |
| Apr 17 | Stanford | Sancet Stadium • Tucson, AZ | L 3–12 | 28-20 | 7-13 |
| Apr 18 | Stanford | Sancet Stadium • Tucson, AZ | L 11–14 | 28-21 | 7-14 |
| Apr 24 | USC | Sancet Stadium • Tucson, AZ | W 4–1 | 29-21 | 8-14 |
| Apr 25 | USC | Sancet Stadium • Tucson, AZ | W 9–4 | 30-21 | 9-14 |
| Apr 26 | USC | Sancet Stadium • Tucson, AZ | W 11–5 | 31-21 | 10-14 |
| May 1 | UCLA | Sancet Stadium • Tucson, AZ | W 10–8 | 32-21 | 11-14 |
| May 2 | UCLA | Sancet Stadium • Tucson, AZ | W 12–8 | 33-21 | 12-14 |
| May 3 | UCLA | Sancet Stadium • Tucson, AZ | W 12–4 | 34-21 | 13-14 |
| May 15 | at Arizona State | Packard Stadium • Tempe, AZ | L 1–2 | 34-22 | 13-15 |
| May 16 | at Arizona State | Packard Stadium • Tempe, AZ | L 2–3 | 34-23 | 13-16 |
| May 17 | at Arizona State | Packard Stadium • Tempe, AZ | L 4–5 | 34-24 | 13-17 |
NCAA West II Regional
| May 22 | vs (1) Pepperdine | Packard Stadium • Tempe, AZ | L 3–7 | 34-25 | |
| May 23 | vs (5) Hawaii | Packard Stadium • Tempe, AZ | L 3–6 | 34-26 | |

=== West II Regional ===
West II Regional Teams
| (1) Pepperdine Waves | (6) Arizona Wildcats | (2) UCLA Bruins | (5) Hawaii Rainbow Warriors | (3) Arizona State Sun Devils | (4) Southwest Missouri State Bears |

at Tempe, AZ

First round
1 | Pepperdine | 7
6 | Arizona | 3
2 | UCLA | 12
5 | Hawaii | 11
3 | Arizona State | 9
4 | SW Missouri State | 5

Second round
Pepperdine | 10
SW Missouri State | 4
UCLA | 3
Arizona State | 9
Hawaii | 6
Arizona | 3

Third round
Pepperdine | 2
Arizona State | 4
UCLA | 16
Hawaii | 7

Semifinals
Pepperdine | 5
UCLA | 21

Final
Arizona State | 14 | —
UCLA | 4 | —

== 1987 MLB draft ==
| Player | Position | Round | Overall | MLB team |
|---|---|---|---|---|
| Gary Alexander | OF | 8 | 207 | Texas Rangers |
| Gil Heredia | RHP | 9 | 230 | San Francisco Giants |
| Chip Hale | OF | 17 | 425 | Minnesota Twins |
| Steve Strong | OF | 24 | 625 | Detroit Tigers |
