= 1987 Southwest Conference baseball tournament =

- Teams: 4
- Format: Double-elimination tournament
- Finals site: Disch–Falk Field; Austin, TX
- Champions: Texas (7th title)
- Winning coach: Cliff Gustafson (7th title)

1987 Southwest Conference baseball standings
	Conf.				Overall
Team	W		L	PCT	W		L	PCT
No. 3 Texas ‍†‍‡‍^{y}	18	–	3	.857	61	–	11	.847
No. 5 Arkansas ‍‍‍^{y}	17	–	4	.810	51	–	16	.761
No. 13 Texas A&M ‍‍‍^{y}	14	–	7	.667	44	–	22	.667
No. 14 Houston ‍‍‍^{y}	11	–	10	.524	40	–	24	.625
Baylor ‍‍‍	9	–	12	.429	38	–	15	.717
Texas Tech ‍‍‍	7	–	14	.333	21	–	28	.429
Rice ‍‍‍	5	–	16	.238	23	–	23	.500
TCU ‍‍‍	4	–	17	.190	24	–	35	.407
† – Conference champion ‡ – Tournament champion y – Invited to the NCAA tournament As of June 30, 1987; Rankings from Collegiate Baseball

The 1987 Southwest Conference baseball tournament was the league's annual postseason tournament used to determine the Southwest Conference's (SWC) automatic bid to the 1987 NCAA Division I baseball tournament. The tournament was held from May 15 through 18 at Disch–Falk Field on the campus of the University of Texas in Austin, Texas.

The number 1 seed Texas Longhorns went 3–0 to win the team's 7th SWC tournament under head coach Cliff Gustafson.

== Format and seeding ==
The tournament featured the top four finishers of the SWC's eight teams in a double-elimination tournament.

Place	Team	Conference				Overall			Seed
Place	Team	W	L	%	GB	W	L	%	Seed
1	Texas	18	3	.857	-	61	11	.847	1
2	Arkansas	17	4	.810	1	51	16	.761	2
3	Texas A&M	14	7	.667	4	44	22	.667	3
4	Houston	11	10	.524	7	40	24	.625	4
5	Baylor	9	12	.429	9	38	15	.717	-
6	Texas Tech	7	14	.333	11	21	28	.429	-
7	Rice	5	16	.238	13	23	23	.500	-
8	TCU	4	17	.190	14	24	35	.407	-

== Tournament ==
Upper round 1
1	Texas	4
4	Houston	3
2	Arkansas	4
3	Texas A&M	3
Lower round 1
4	Houston	11
3	Texas A&M	7

Upper final
1	Texas	10
2	Arkansas	3
Lower final
2	Arkansas	14
4	Houston	9

Final
1	Texas	3	–
2	Arkansas	2	–
