= 1987 Florida State Seminoles baseball team =

American college baseball season

1987 Florida State Seminoles baseball

NCAA Atlantic Regional champions Metro tournament champions

College World Series, 1–2
- Conference: Metro Conference (1975–1995)
- Record: 54–16 (9–3 Metro)
- Head coach: Mike Martin (8th year)
- Home stadium: Seminole Stadium

1987 Metro Conference baseball standings
	Conf.				Overall
Team	W		L	PCT	W		L	PCT
South Carolina ‍‍‍	13	–	1	.929	39	–	14	.736
No. 6 Florida State ‍‍‡‍^{y}	9	–	3	.750	55	–	18	.753
Virginia Tech ‍‍‍	9	–	5	.643	32	–	16	.667
Memphis State ‍‍‍	9	–	9	.500	33	–	23	.589
Southern Miss ‍‍‍	7	–	11	.389	36	–	25	.590
Cincinnati ‍‍‍	5	–	8	.385	31	–	22	.585
Louisville ‍‍‍	1	–	14	.067	12	–	36	.250
‡ – Tournament champion y – Invited to the NCAA tournament As of June 30, 1987; Rankings from Collegiate Baseball

The 1987 Florida State Seminoles baseball team represented Florida State University in the 1987 NCAA Division I baseball season. The Seminoles played their home games at Seminole Stadium. The team was coached by Mike Martin in his eighth season as head coach at Florida State.

The Seminoles reached the College World Series, their ninth appearance in Omaha, where they finished tied for fifth place after recording a win against Arizona State and losses to eventual semifinalists LSU and Texas.

== Personnel ==
=== Roster ===
1987 Florida State Seminoles roster
Pitchers: 4 - Richie Lewis - Junior; 9 - Jon Egertson - Junior; 14 - Matt Dunbar - Freshman; 15 - Mike Schmit - Senior; 16 - Clay Robertson - Junior; 17 - Steve Kovensky - Senior; 21 - Rod Byerly - Junior; 22 - Jerry Nielsen - Junior; 23 - John Wanish - Junior; 27 - Mike Brady - Senior; 29 - Chris Pollack - Senior; 30 - Ed Porcelli - Senior; 31 - Paul Thomas - (redshirt) Junior; 42 - Ron Spyker - Junior; 44 - Bryan Campbell - Junior	Catchers: 18 - Willie Woods - Junior; 24 - Barry Blackwell - Junior; 32 - Robert Epstein - Freshman; 43 - Ed Fulton - Junior; 49 - Shawn Troxel - Junior; Infielders: 1 - Edwin Alicea - Sophomore; 12 - Rafael Bournigal - Junior; 13 - Donny Erickson - Junior; 19 - Jose Marzan - Senior; 25 - Mike Holman - Freshman; 26 - Mike Rudi - Freshman	Outfielders: 2 - Deion Sanders - Sophomore; 5 - Victor Floyd - Sophomore; 6 - Marc Giordano - Junior; 7 - Ronald Lewis - Freshman; 10 - B.J. Guzzone - Junior; 18 - Keith Kidd - Senior; 20 - Greg Clayborne - Junior; 39 - Mike Skoutelakis - Senior; 45 - Steve Taddeo - Senior

=== Coaches ===
1987 Florida State Seminoles baseball coaching staff
- Mike Martin - Head coach - 8th year

== Schedule and results ==
Legend
Florida State win
Florida State loss

1987 Florida State Seminoles baseball game log
Regular season

February
Date	Opponent	Site/stadium	Score	Overall record	Metro record
Feb 6	Samford*	Seminole Stadium • Tallahassee, FL	W 15–1	1–0	
Feb 7	Samford*	Seminole Stadium • Tallahassee, FL	W 9–1^{8}	2–0	
Feb 12	Grambling State*	Seminole Stadium • Tallahassee, FL	W 4–3	3–0	
Feb 13	Grambling State*	Seminole Stadium • Tallahassee, FL	W 9–2	4–0	
Feb 14	Grambling State*	Seminole Stadium • Tallahassee, FL	W 12–6	5–0	
Feb 17	Samford*	Seminole Stadium • Tallahassee, FL	W 4–1	6–0	
Feb 18	Samford*	Seminole Stadium • Tallahassee, FL	W 7–2	7–0	
Feb 20	vs New Orleans*	Louisiana Superdome • New Orleans, LA	L 1–3	7–1	
Feb 21	vs Tulane*	Louisiana Superdome • New Orleans, LA	W 9–5	8–1	
Feb 22	vs LSU*	Louisiana Superdome • New Orleans, LA	W 2–1	9–1	
Feb 28	Southern Miss	Seminole Stadium • Tallahassee, FL	W 7–2	10–1	1–0
Feb 28	Southern Miss	Seminole Stadium • Tallahassee, FL	W 10–4	11–1	2–0

March
Date	Opponent	Site/stadium	Score	Overall record	
Mar 1	Southern Miss	Seminole Stadium • Tallahassee, FL	L 8–11	11–2	2–1
Mar 3	Ball State*	Seminole Stadium • Tallahassee, FL	W 10–3	12–2	
Mar 4	Ball State*	Seminole Stadium • Tallahassee, FL	W 9–2	13–2	
Mar 5	Ball State*	Seminole Stadium • Tallahassee, FL	W 14–10	14–2	
Mar 8	South Florida*	Seminole Stadium • Tallahassee, FL	W 13–4	15–2	
Mar 8	South Florida*	Seminole Stadium • Tallahassee, FL	L 4–5	15–3	
Mar 10	at South Florida*	Red McEwen Field • Tampa, FL	L 2–5	15–4	
Mar 12	at South Florida*	Red McEwen Field • Tampa, FL	W 17–1	16–4	
Mar 13	Austin Peay State*	Seminole Stadium • Tallahassee, FL	W 8–3	17–4	
Mar 14	Austin Peay State*	Seminole Stadium • Tallahassee, FL	W 15–0	18–4	
Mar 15	Austin Peay State*	Seminole Stadium • Tallahassee, FL	W 26–1	19–4	
Mar 16	UNC Charlotte*	Seminole Stadium • Tallahassee, FL	W 9–1	20–4	
Mar 17	UNC Charlotte*	Seminole Stadium • Tallahassee, FL	W 14–5	21–4	
Mar 19	at South Alabama*	Eddie Stanky Field • Mobile, AL	L 3–7	21–5	
Mar 21	at Southern Miss	Pete Taylor Park • Hattiesburg, MS	L 1–3	21–6	2–2
Mar 21	at Southern Miss	Pete Taylor Park • Hattiesburg, MS	W 4–2	22–6	3–2
Mar 22	at Southern Miss	Pete Taylor Park • Hattiesburg, MS	W 13–9	23–6	4–2
Mar 24	UCF*	Seminole Stadium • Tallahassee, FL	W 12–4	24–6	
Mar 25	UCF*	Seminole Stadium • Tallahassee, FL	W 4–3	25–6	
Mar 28	at Memphis State	Nat Buring Stadium • Memphis, TN	W 4–1	26–6	5–2
Mar 28	at Memphis State	Nat Buring Stadium • Memphis, TN	W 8–0	27–6	6–2
Mar 29	at Memphis State	Nat Buring Stadium • Memphis, TN	L 4–5^{10}	27–7	6–3
Mar 31	at Georgia Tech*	Russ Chandler Stadium • Atlanta, GA	W 7–5	28–7	

April
Date	Opponent	Site/stadium	Score	Overall record	
Apr 1	at Georgia Tech*	Russ Chandler Stadium • Atlanta, GA	W 10–8	29–7	
Apr 4	Georgia*	Seminole Stadium • Tallahassee, FL	L 5–6	29–8	
Apr 5	Georgia*	Seminole Stadium • Tallahassee, FL	L 3–4	29–9	
Apr 7	Jacksonville*	Seminole Stadium • Tallahassee, FL	W 9–3	30–9	
Apr 8	Jacksonville*	Seminole Stadium • Tallahassee, FL	W 9–7	31–9	
Apr 10	Miami (FL)*	Seminole Stadium • Tallahassee, FL	W 14–3	32–9	
Apr 11	Miami (FL)*	Seminole Stadium • Tallahassee, FL	L 6–11	32–10	
Apr 12	Miami (FL)*	Seminole Stadium • Tallahassee, FL	L 10–11^{11}	32–11	
Apr 14	Florida*	Seminole Stadium • Tallahassee, FL	W 12–6	33–11	
Apr 15	Florida*	Seminole Stadium • Tallahassee, FL	W 14–11	34–11	
Apr 16	South Alabama*	Seminole Stadium • Tallahassee, FL	W 9–4	35–11	
Apr 18	Memphis State	Seminole Stadium • Tallahassee, FL	W 6–4	36–11	7–3
Apr 18	Memphis State	Seminole Stadium • Tallahassee, FL	W 7–6	37–11	8–3
Apr 19	Memphis State	Seminole Stadium • Tallahassee, FL	W 7–5	38–11	9–3
Apr 23	at UCF*	UCF Baseball Complex • Orlando, FL	L 5–8	38–12	
Apr 24	at Jacksonville*	Jacksonville, FL	W 9–8^{12}	39–12	
Apr 25	at Jacksonville*	Jacksonville, FL	W 11–10^{10}	40–12	

May
Date	Opponent	Site/stadium	Score	Overall record
May 1	at Miami (FL)*	Mark Light Field • Coral Gables, FL	L 3–4^{10}	40–13
May 2	at Miami (FL)*	Mark Light Field • Coral Gables, FL	W 6–4^{11}	41–13
May 3	at Miami (FL)*	Mark Light Field • Coral Gables, FL	W 8–6	42–13
May 5	at Florida*	Perry Field • Gainesville, FL	L 5–10	42–14
May 6	at Florida*	Perry Field • Gainesville, FL	L 5–7	42–15
May 8	Mercer*	Seminole Stadium • Tallahassee, FL	W 6–2	43–15
May 9	Mercer*	Seminole Stadium • Tallahassee, FL	W 14–2	44–15
May 9	Mercer*	Seminole Stadium • Tallahassee, FL	W 8–3	45–15

Postseason

Metro Conference Tournament
Date	Opponent	Site/stadium	Score	Overall record	Tourn Record
May 13	Louisville	W 9–2	46–15	1–0	
May 14	Virginia Tech	W 5–4	47–15	2–0	
May 15	South Carolina	W 9–5	48–15	3–0	
May 16	Southern Miss	W 5–1	49–15	4–0	
May 16	Cincinnati	W 6–3	50–15	5–0	

NCAA Atlantic Regional
Date	Opponent	Site/stadium	Score	Overall record	NCAAT record
May 21	East Carolina	Mark Light Field • Coral Gables, FL	W 10–5	51–15	1–0
May 22	Miami (FL)	Mark Light Field • Coral Gables, FL	W 5–2	52–15	2–0
May 23	South Alabama	Mark Light Field • Coral Gables, FL	W 12–3	53–15	3–0
May 24	South Alabama	Mark Light Field • Coral Gables, FL	L 3–6	53–16	3–1
May 24	South Alabama	Mark Light Field • Coral Gables, FL	W 9–2	54–16	4–1

College World Series
Date	Opponent	Site/stadium	Score	Overall record	CWS record
May 29	LSU	Johnny Rosenblatt Stadium • Omaha, NE	L 2–6^{10}	54–17	0–1
May 31	Arizona State	Johnny Rosenblatt Stadium • Omaha, NE	W 3–0	55–17	1–1
June 3	Texas	Johnny Rosenblatt Stadium • Omaha, NE	'L 4–6^{10}	55–18	1–2
