= 1987 Oklahoma State Cowboys baseball team =

American college baseball season

1987 Oklahoma State Cowboys baseball

Big 8 Champions Mideast Regional champions

College World Series, 2nd
- Conference: Big Eight Conference
- CB: No. 2
- Record: 59–13 (15–6 Big 8)
- Head coach: Gary Ward (10th year)
- Home stadium: Allie P. Reynolds Stadium

1987 Big Eight Conference baseball standings
	Conf.				Overall
Team	W		L	PCT	W		L	PCT
No. 2 Oklahoma State ^{†‡y} ‍‍‍	15	–	6	.714	59	–	13	.819
No. 26 Oklahoma ‍‍‍^{y}	17	–	7	.708	42	–	20	.677
Nebraska ‍‍‍	12	–	8	.600	36	–	21	.632
Missouri ‍‍‍	14	–	10	.583	36	–	26	.581
Kansas State ‍‍‍	9	–	12	.429	28	–	24	.538
Iowa State ‍‍‍	7	–	13	.350	25	–	27	.481
Kansas ‍‍‍	3	–	21	.125	15	–	39	.278
† – Conference champion ‡ – Tournament champion y – Invited to the NCAA tournament As of June 30, 1987; Rankings from Collegiate Baseball

The 1987 Oklahoma State Cowboys baseball team represented Oklahoma State University–Stillwater in the 1987 NCAA Division I baseball season. The Cowboys played their home games at Allie P. Reynolds Stadium in Stillwater, Oklahoma. The team was coached by Gary Ward in his tenth season at Oklahoma State.

The Cowboys reached the College World Series, finishing as the runner up to Stanford.

The Cowboys also won the Big Eight Conference championship, the seventh in a string of sixteen consecutive conference titles which lasted until the league merged with the Southwest Conference.

== Roster ==
1987 Oklahoma State Cowboys roster
- John Autolino; - Brent Bell; - Bret Bouher; - Darwin Devaughan; - Hart Lee Dykes; - Mark Gardella; - Thomas Hardgrove; - Mark Hudson; - Nicholas Kounas; - Paul Ludwig; - Mark Malizia; - Tom Mann; - Brad Maroney; - Jerry A. Retton; - Scott Sadler; - James Sloan; - Donald Ward	Pitchers: - Pat Hope; - Steve Lienhard; - Jimmy Long; - Tim Pugh; - Marv Rockman	Infielders: - Jimmy Barragan; - Brad Beanblossom; - Monty Fariss; - Jim Ifland; - Robin Ventura; Catchers: - Adam Smith; - Rocky Ward	Outfielders: - Anthony Blackmon; - Benigno E. Castillo; - Ray Ortiz

== Schedule ==
Legend
Oklahoma State win
Oklahoma State loss

1987 Oklahoma State Cowboys baseball game log
Regular season

February/March
Date	Opponent	Site/stadium	Score	Overall record	Big 8 record
Feb 19	Nicholls State*	Allie P. Reynolds Stadium • Stillwater, OK	W 10–3	1–0	
Mar 4	Texas Tech*	Allie P. Reynolds Stadium • Stillwater, OK	W 13–6	2–0	
Mar 5	Texas Tech*	Allie P. Reynolds Stadium • Stillwater, OK	W 14–6	3–0	
Mar 7	Air Force*	Allie P. Reynolds Stadium • Stillwater, OK	W 13–3	4–0	
Mar 7	Air Force*	Allie P. Reynolds Stadium • Stillwater, OK	W 12–0	5–0	
Mar 8	Air Force*	Allie P. Reynolds Stadium • Stillwater, OK	W 18–12	6–0	
Mar 10	at Texas–Arlington*	Clay Gould Ballpark • Arlington, TX	W 9–5	7–0	
Mar 11	North Texas State*	Allie P. Reynolds Stadium • Stillwater, OK	L 7–8	7–1	
Mar 13	vs Washington State*	Bossier City, LA (Bossier City Classic)	W 5–4	8–1	
Mar 14	vs Maine*	Bossier City, LA (Bossier City Classic)	W 19–1	9–1	
Mar 15	vs North Carolina*	Bossier City, LA (Bossier City Classic)	W 9–8	10–1	
Mar 18	Missouri Southern*	Allie P. Reynolds Stadium • Stillwater, OK	W 23–1	11–1	
Mar 18	Washington State*	Allie P. Reynolds Stadium • Stillwater, OK	W 9–1	12–1	
Mar 20	South Dakota State*	Allie P. Reynolds Stadium • Stillwater, OK	W 23–13	13–1	
Mar 20	South Dakota State*	Allie P. Reynolds Stadium • Stillwater, OK	W 21–2	14–1	
Mar 21	South Dakota State*	Allie P. Reynolds Stadium • Stillwater, OK	W 13–3	15–1	
Mar 21	South Dakota State*	Allie P. Reynolds Stadium • Stillwater, OK	W 15–0	16–1	
Mar 24	Centenary*	Allie P. Reynolds Stadium • Stillwater, OK	W 17–2	17–1	
Mar 25	Arkansas*	Allie P. Reynolds Stadium • Stillwater, OK	W 8–1	18–1	
Mar 27	at Kansas State	Tointon Family Stadium • Manhattan, KS	W 16–6	19–1	1–0
Mar 31	TCU*	Allie P. Reynolds Stadium • Stillwater, OK	W 10–7	20–1	

April
Date	Opponent	Site/stadium	Score	Overall record	Big 8 record
Apr 1	TCU*	Allie P. Reynolds Stadium • Stillwater, OK	W 11–4	21–1	
Apr 2	Missouri Southern*	Allie P. Reynolds Stadium • Stillwater, OK	W 15–11	22–1	
Apr 3	at Oral Roberts*	J. L. Johnson Stadium • Tulsa, OK	W 14–8	23–1	
Apr 4	Oral Roberts*	Allie P. Reynolds Stadium • Stillwater, OK	W 8–5	24–1	
Apr 5	Southwest Missouri State*	Allie P. Reynolds Stadium • Stillwater, OK	W 13–7	25–1	
Apr 6	at Wichita State*	Eck Stadium • Wichita, KS	W 9–8	26–1	
Apr 7	North Texas State*	Allie P. Reynolds Stadium • Stillwater, OK	W 17–0	27–1	
Apr 7	North Texas State*	Allie P. Reynolds Stadium • Stillwater, OK	W 13–3	28–1	
Apr 8	North Texas State*	Allie P. Reynolds Stadium • Stillwater, OK	W 14–13	29–1	
Apr 10	Missouri	Allie P. Reynolds Stadium • Stillwater, OK	W 13–0	30–1	2–0
Apr 10	Missouri	Allie P. Reynolds Stadium • Stillwater, OK	W 8–2	31–1	3–0
Apr 11	Missouri	Allie P. Reynolds Stadium • Stillwater, OK	L 4–5	31–2	3–1
Apr 12	Missouri	Allie P. Reynolds Stadium • Stillwater, OK	W 11–6	32–2	4–1
Apr 13	Texas A&M*	Allie P. Reynolds Stadium • Stillwater, OK	W 14–11	33–2	
Apr 15	Arkansas–Little Rock*	Allie P. Reynolds Stadium • Stillwater, OK	L 4–7	33–3	
Apr 15	Arkansas–Little Rock*	Allie P. Reynolds Stadium • Stillwater, OK	W 11–3	34–3	
Apr 16	Texas Wesleyan*	Allie P. Reynolds Stadium • Stillwater, OK	W 19–9	35–3	
Apr 16	Texas Wesleyan*	Allie P. Reynolds Stadium • Stillwater, OK	W 11–6	36–3	
Apr 18	at Kansas	Hoglund Ballpark • Lawrence, KS	W 13–3	37–3	5–1
Apr 19	at Kansas	Hoglund Ballpark • Lawrence, KS	W 12–1	38–3	6–1
Apr 19	at Kansas	Hoglund Ballpark • Lawrence, KS	W 15–2	39–3	7–1
Apr 20	at Kansas	Hoglund Ballpark • Lawrence, KS	W 21–3	40–3	8–1
Apr 21	at Arkansas*	George Cole Field • Fayetteville, AR	L 8–9	40–4	
Apr 24	Nebraska	Allie P. Reynolds Stadium • Stillwater, OK	W 21–5	41–4	9–1
Apr 25	Nebraska	Allie P. Reynolds Stadium • Stillwater, OK	W 8–3	42–4	10–1
Apr 25	Nebraska	Allie P. Reynolds Stadium • Stillwater, OK	W 13–7	43–4	11–1
Apr 26	Nebraska	Allie P. Reynolds Stadium • Stillwater, OK	L 14–15	43–5	11–2

May
Date	Opponent	Site/stadium	Score	Overall record	Big 8 record
May 1	at Iowa State	Cap Timm Field • Ames, IA	W 9–4	44–5	12–2
May 1	at Iowa State	Cap Timm Field • Ames, IA	L 8–9	44–6	12–3
May 2	at Iowa State	Cap Timm Field • Ames, IA	W 12–2	45–6	13–3
May 3	at Iowa State	Cap Timm Field • Ames, IA	L 2–3	45–7	13–4
May 8	Oklahoma	Allie P. Reynolds Stadium • Stillwater, OK	L 4–8	45–8	13–5
May 9	Oklahoma	Allie P. Reynolds Stadium • Stillwater, OK	W 23–7	46–8	14–5
May 9	Oklahoma	Allie P. Reynolds Stadium • Stillwater, OK	W 14–2	47–8	15–5
May 10	vs Oklahoma	All Sports Stadium • Oklahoma City, OK (Bedlam Series)	L 8–15	47–9	15–6

Postseason

Big Eight Tournament
Date	Opponent	Site/stadium	Score	Overall record	Big 8 T Record
May 13	Missouri	All Sports Stadium • Oklahoma City, OK	W 5–2	48–9	1–0
May 14	Oklahoma	All Sports Stadium • Oklahoma City, OK	L 4–9	48–10	1–1
May 15	Missouri	All Sports Stadium • Oklahoma City, OK	W 18–14	49–10	2–1
May 16	Oklahoma	All Sports Stadium • Oklahoma City, OK	W 15–6	50–10	3–1
May 17	Oklahoma	All Sports Stadium • Oklahoma City, OK	W 9–6	51–10	4–1

NCAA Mideast Regional
Date	Opponent	Site/stadium	Score	Overall record	NCAAT record
May 21	Western Carolina	Dudy Noble Field • Starkville, MS	W 6–3	52–10	1–0
May 22	NC State	Dudy Noble Field • Starkville, MS	W 8–6	53–10	2–0
May 22	Texas A&M	Dudy Noble Field • Starkville, MS	L 1–4	53–11	2–1
May 24	Western Carolina	Dudy Noble Field • Starkville, MS	W 9–6	54–11	3–1
May 24	Texas A&M	Dudy Noble Field • Starkville, MS	W 7–4	55–11	4–1
May 25	Texas A&M	Dudy Noble Field • Starkville, MS	W 11–9	56–11	5–1

College World Series
Date	Opponent	Site/stadium	Score	Overall record	CWS record
May 29	Arizona State	Johnny Rosenblatt Stadium • Omaha, NE	W 8–3	57–11	1–0
June 1	LSU	Johnny Rosenblatt Stadium • Omaha, NE	W 8–7	58–11	2–0
June 4	Stanford	Johnny Rosenblatt Stadium • Omaha, NE	W 6–2	59–11	3–0
June 5	Texas	Johnny Rosenblatt Stadium • Omaha, NE	L 5–6	59–12	3–1
June 7	Stanford	Johnny Rosenblatt Stadium • Omaha, NE	L 5–9	59–13	3–2
