= Mark Marquess =

American college baseball coach (1947–2026)

Biographical details
- Born: March 24, 1947; Stockton, California, U.S.
- Died: January 30, 2026 (aged 78); Mountain View, California, U.S.

Playing career
- 1967–1969: Stanford
- Position: First baseman

Coaching career (HC unless noted)
- 1972–1976: Stanford (asst.)
- 1977–2017: Stanford
- 2018–2026: Santa Clara (special asst.)

Head coaching record
- Overall: 1,627–878–7

Accomplishments and honors

Championships
- 2× College World Series (1987, 1988); 7× Pac-10 Southern Division (1983, 1985, 1987, 1990, 1994, 1997, 1998); 4× Pac-10 (1999, 2000, 2003, 2004)

Awards
- 3× NCAA Coach of the Year (1985, 1987, 1988); Baseball America College Coach of the Year (1987); ABCA West Region Coach of the Year (2001); 7× Pac-10 Southern Division Coach of the Year (1983, 1985, 1987, 1990, 1994, 1997, 1998); 2× Pac-10 Coach of the Year (1999, 2003)
Medal record
Men's baseball
Representing the United States
Summer Olympics
Gold medal – first place	1988 Seoul	Team
World Games
Gold medal – first place	1981 Santa Clara	Team
Pan American Games
Gold medal – first place	1967 Winnipeg	Team
Baseball World Cup
Bronze medal – third place	1984 Havana	Team
Intercontinental Cup
Gold medal – first place	1981 Edmonton	Team
Silver medal – second place	1987 Havana	Team

Mark Edward Marquess (March 24, 1947 – January 30, 2026) was an American college baseball coach. He served as the head coach of the Stanford Cardinal baseball team from 1977 to 2017.

== Early life and professional baseball career ==
Born and raised in Stockton, California, Marquess graduated from Stagg High School in Stockton in 1965, then attended Stanford University from 1965 to 1969, where he played on the Stanford Cardinal baseball team at first base from 1967 to 1969 and football team from 1966 to 1968 at quarterback, split end, defensive back, and punt returner.

At Stanford, Marquess was a member of Delta Tau Delta International Fraternity. His freshman year roommate at Stanford was Mitt Romney, who went on to become Governor of Massachusetts and the Republican nominee for President in 2012.

Selected by the Chicago White Sox in the 25th round of the 1969 Major League Baseball draft, Marquess played minor league baseball for the White Sox organization from 1969 to 1973, the last year as a player-coach for the Iowa Oaks, the White Sox's top affiliate.

== Coaching career ==
From 1972 to 1976, Marquess was an assistant coach at Stanford under Ray Young before being promoted to head coach in 1977.

In his 41 years at Stanford, he compiled a record of 1,627–878–7 (.649). His teams made the postseason 23 times, and had a record of 109–50 there. His teams had a 65–25 record in the NCAA Regionals, a 10–2 record. in the NCAA Super Regionals, and a 34–23 record in the College World Series, with back-to-back national titles in 1987 and 1988. He is a member of the Stanford Athletic Hall of Fame. He announced his retirement in 2016.

== Death ==
Marquess died in Mountain View, California on January 30, 2026 at the age of 78.

== Head coaching records ==
The following is a table of Marquess's yearly records as an NCAA head baseball coach.

Record table
Season	Team	Overall	Conference	Standing	Postseason
Stanford Cardinal (Pacific-8/Pacific-10/Pac-12 Conference) (1977–2017)
1977	Stanford	43–23	5–13	T–3rd (South)	
1978	Stanford	35–20–1	6–12	T–3rd (South)	
1979	Stanford	35–23	13–17	5th (South)	
1980	Stanford	29–24	13–17	T–5th (South)	
1981	Stanford	43–22–1	16–14	2nd (South)	NCAA Regional
1982	Stanford	49–18–1	20–10	2nd (South)	College World Series
1983	Stanford	41–17–1	20–10	1st (South)	College World Series
1984	Stanford	38–26–1	18–12	T–2nd (South)	NCAA Regional
1985	Stanford	47–15	23–7	1st (South)	College World Series
1986	Stanford	38–23	18–12	T–2nd (South)	NCAA Regional
1987	Stanford	53–17	21–9	1st (South)	College World Series Champion
1988	Stanford	46–23	18–12	2nd (South)	College World Series Champion
1989	Stanford	30–28	12–18	4th (South)	
1990	Stanford	59–12	24–6	1st (South)	College World Series
1991	Stanford	39–23–1	18–12	2nd (South)	NCAA Regional
1992	Stanford	39–23	17–13	2nd (South)	NCAA Regional
1993	Stanford	27–28	10–20	6th (South)	
1994	Stanford	36–24	21–9	1st (South)	NCAA Regional
1995	Stanford	40–25	20–10	2nd (South)	College World Series
1996	Stanford	41–19	19–11	2nd (South)	NCAA Regional
1997	Stanford	45–20	21–9	1st (South)	College World Series
1998	Stanford	42–14–1	22–8	1st (South)	NCAA Regional
1999	Stanford	50–15	19–5	1st	College World Series
2000	Stanford	50–16	17–7	T–1st	College World Series Runner-up
2001	Stanford	51–17	17–7	2nd	College World Series Runner-up
2002	Stanford	47–18	16–8	2nd	College World Series
2003	Stanford	51–18	18–6	1st	College World Series Runner-up
2004	Stanford	46–14	16–8	1st	NCAA Regional
2005	Stanford	34–25	12–12	T–6th	NCAA Regional
2006	Stanford	33–27	11–13	T–5th	NCAA Super Regional
2007	Stanford	28–28	9–15	8th	
2008	Stanford	41–24	14–10	2nd	College World Series
2009	Stanford	30–25	13–14	T–5th	
2010	Stanford	31–25	14–13	4th	NCAA Regional
2011	Stanford	35–22	14–12	5th	NCAA Super Regional
2012	Stanford	41–18	18–12	T–4th	NCAA Super Regional
2013	Stanford	32–22	16–14	T–4th	
2014	Stanford	35–26	16–14	T–5th	NCAA Super Regional
2015	Stanford	24–32	9–21	10th	
2016	Stanford	31–23	15–15	T–6th	
2017	Stanford	42–16	21–9	2nd	NCAA Regional
Stanford:		1,627–878–7	660–476		
Total:		1,627–878–7			
National champion Postseason invitational champion Conference regular season champion Conference regular season and conference tournament champion Division regular season champion Division regular season and conference tournament champion Conference tournament champion

== International coaching ==
- USA Baseball Olympic Head Coach (1988)
- USA Baseball Head Coach (1981, 1987, 1988)
- USA Baseball Assistant Coach (1984)
- Gold Medal (1981 Intercontinental Cup)
- Gold Medal (1981 World Games)
- Silver Medal (1987 Intercontinental Cup)
- International Coach of the Year (1988)

== See also ==
- List of college baseball career coaching wins leaders
