= 1987 Texas Longhorns baseball team =

American college baseball season

1987 Texas Longhorns baseball

NCAA Central Regional champions SWC tournament champions SWC champions

College World Series, 3–2
- Conference: Southwest Conference
- Record: 61–11 (18–3 SWC)
- Head coach: Cliff Gustafson (20th year)
- Home stadium: Disch–Falk Field

1987 Southwest Conference baseball standings
	Conf.				Overall
Team	W		L	PCT	W		L	PCT
No. 3 Texas ‍†‍‡‍^{y}	18	–	3	.857	61	–	11	.847
No. 5 Arkansas ‍‍‍^{y}	17	–	4	.810	51	–	16	.761
No. 13 Texas A&M ‍‍‍^{y}	14	–	7	.667	44	–	22	.667
No. 14 Houston ‍‍‍^{y}	11	–	10	.524	40	–	24	.625
Baylor ‍‍‍	9	–	12	.429	38	–	15	.717
Texas Tech ‍‍‍	7	–	14	.333	21	–	28	.429
Rice ‍‍‍	5	–	16	.238	23	–	23	.500
TCU ‍‍‍	4	–	17	.190	24	–	35	.407
† – Conference champion ‡ – Tournament champion y – Invited to the NCAA tournament As of June 30, 1987; Rankings from Collegiate Baseball

The 1987 Texas Longhorns baseball team represented the University of Texas at Austin in the 1987 NCAA Division I baseball season. The Longhorns played their home games at Disch–Falk Field. The team was coached by Cliff Gustafson in his 20th season at Texas.

The Longhorns reached the College World Series, finishing third with wins over Arkansas, Florida State and eventual runner-up Oklahoma State and a pair of losses to eventual champion Stanford.

== Personnel ==
=== Roster ===
1987 Texas Longhorns roster
Pitchers: 10 - Curt Krippner; 31 - Mark Petkovsek; 33 - John Morton; Catchers: 13 - Brian Johnson	Infielders: 5 - Ty Harrington; 11 - Todd Haney; 32 - Brian Cisarik; Outfielders: 4 - Rusty Crockett; 8 - Scott Coolbaugh; 25 - Scott Bryant	Unknown: 1 - Doug Lindauer; 2 - Koby Kerlin; 3 - Elanis R. Westbrooks; 6 - Craig Newkirk; 9 - Wes Tumey; 12 - Tim Davis; 14 - Mike Patrick; 15 - Lenny Bell; 20 - Brian Johnson; 21 - Steve Cantu; 23 - Kevin W. Garner; 28 - Mike Bradley; 29 - Terry Suggs; 35 - Trent Turner; 36 - Dale Ray; 42 - Curry Harden

== Schedule and results ==
Legend
Texas win
Texas loss
Tie

1987 Texas Longhorns baseball game log
Regular season

February
Date	Opponent	Site/stadium	Score	Overall record	SWC record
Feb 8	Miami (FL)*	Disch–Falk Field • Austin, TX	W 16–6	1–0	
Feb 9	Miami (FL)*	Disch–Falk Field • Austin, TX	W 8–7	2–0	
Feb 13	Texas Lutheran*	Disch–Falk Field • Austin, TX	W 14–3	3–0	
Feb 13	Texas Lutheran*	Disch–Falk Field • Austin, TX	W 10–3	4–0	
Feb 14	Texas–Arlington*	Disch–Falk Field • Austin, TX	W 7–2	5–0	
Feb 14	Texas–Arlington*	Disch–Falk Field • Austin, TX	W 7–6	6–0	
Feb 15	Texas–Arlington*	Disch–Falk Field • Austin, TX	W 9–5	7–0	
Feb 15	Texas–Arlington*	Disch–Falk Field • Austin, TX	W 12–8	8–0	
Feb 20	at Arizona State*	Packard Stadium • Tempe, AZ	W 7–4	9–0	
Feb 21	at Arizona State*	Packard Stadium • Tempe, AZ	L 5–6	9–1	
Feb 22	at Arizona State*	Packard Stadium • Tempe, AZ	W 11–2	10–1	
Feb 24	Hardin–Simmons*	Disch–Falk Field • Austin, TX	W 12–2	11–1	
Feb 24	Hardin–Simmons*	Disch–Falk Field • Austin, TX	W 5–0	12–1	
Feb 28	UC Santa Barbara*	Disch–Falk Field • Austin, TX	L 5–8	12–2	
Feb 28	UC Santa Barbara*	Disch–Falk Field • Austin, TX	W 1–0	13–2	

March
Date	Opponent	Site/stadium	Score	Overall record	SWC record
Mar 1	UC Santa Barbara*	Disch–Falk Field • Austin, TX	L 4–5	13–3	
Mar 3	Southwestern*	Disch–Falk Field • Austin, TX	W 2–1 (Note: Mark Petkovsek threw a no-hitter.)	14–3	
Mar 3	Southwestern*	Disch–Falk Field • Austin, TX	W 2–1	15–3	
Mar 5	St. Mary's*	Disch–Falk Field • Austin, TX	W 13–7	16–3	
Mar 5	St. Mary's*	Disch–Falk Field • Austin, TX	W 13–7	17–3	
Mar 7	Oklahoma*	Disch–Falk Field • Austin, TX	W 6–5	18–3	
Mar 7	Washington State*	Disch–Falk Field • Austin, TX	W 11–7	19–3	
Mar 8	Washington State*	Disch–Falk Field • Austin, TX	W 3–2	20–3	
Mar 8	Washington State*	Disch–Falk Field • Austin, TX	L 2–5	20–4	
Mar 9	Oklahoma*	Disch–Falk Field • Austin, TX	L 3–13	20–5	
Mar 11	Western Kentucky*	Disch–Falk Field • Austin, TX	W 18–6	21–5	
Mar 13	Southwestern Louisiana*	Disch–Falk Field • Austin, TX	W 9–0	22–5	
Mar 14	Southwestern Louisiana*	Disch–Falk Field • Austin, TX	W 6–5	23–5	
Mar 14	Kansas State*	Disch–Falk Field • Austin, TX	W 14–3	24–5	
Mar 15	Kansas State*	Disch–Falk Field • Austin, TX	W 11–1	25–5	
Mar 15	Kansas State*	Disch–Falk Field • Austin, TX	W 11–8	26–5	
Mar 16	Emporia State*	Disch–Falk Field • Austin, TX	W 8–2	27–5	
Mar 16	Emporia State*	Disch–Falk Field • Austin, TX	W 11–3	28–5	
Mar 17	Lubbock Christian*	Disch–Falk Field • Austin, TX	W 15–4	29–5	
Mar 18	Lubbock Christian*	Disch–Falk Field • Austin, TX	L 0–4	29–6	
Mar 20	TCU	Disch–Falk Field • Austin, TX	W 13–5	30–6	1–0
Mar 21	TCU	Disch–Falk Field • Austin, TX	W 6–2	31–6	2–0
Mar 21	TCU	Disch–Falk Field • Austin, TX	W 6–0	32–6	3–0
Mar 23	South Alabama*	Disch–Falk Field • Austin, TX	W 21–2	33–6	
Mar 27	at Baylor	Ferrell Field • Waco, TX	L 3–15	33–7	3–1
Mar 28	at Baylor	Ferrell Field • Waco, TX	W 4–3	34–7	4–1
Mar 28	at Baylor	Ferrell Field • Waco, TX	W 5–3	35–7	5–1

April/May
Date	Opponent	Site/stadium	Score	Overall record	SWC record
Apr 3	Rice	Disch–Falk Field • Austin, TX	W 25–4	36–7	6–1
Apr 4	Rice	Disch–Falk Field • Austin, TX	W 11–1	37–7	7–1
Apr 4	Rice	Disch–Falk Field • Austin, TX	W 12–4	38–7	8–1
Apr 6	Dallas Baptist*	Disch–Falk Field • Austin, TX	W 5–4	39–7	
Apr 6	Dallas Baptist*	Disch–Falk Field • Austin, TX	W 12–2	40–7	
Apr 7	Dallas Baptist*	Disch–Falk Field • Austin, TX	W 5–2	41–7	
Apr 10	Texas Tech	Disch–Falk Field • Austin, TX	W 11–1	42–7	9–1
Apr 11	Texas Tech	Disch–Falk Field • Austin, TX	W 11–0	43–7	10–1
Apr 11	Texas Tech	Disch–Falk Field • Austin, TX	W 8–3	44–7	11–1
Apr 17	at Texas A&M	Olsen Field • College Station, TX	W 8–2	45–7	12–1
Apr 18	at Texas A&M	Olsen Field • College Station, TX	W 10–9	46–7	13–1
Apr 18	at Texas A&M	Olsen Field • College Station, TX	L 3–10	46–8	13–2
Apr 24	Houston	Disch–Falk Field • Austin, TX	W 15–2	47–8	14–2
Apr 25	Houston	Disch–Falk Field • Austin, TX	W 4–2	48–8	15–2
Apr 25	Houston	Disch–Falk Field • Austin, TX	W 7–4	49–8	16–2
May 1	at Arkansas	George Cole Field • Fayetteville, AR	W 9–5	50–8	17–2
May 2	at Arkansas	George Cole Field • Fayetteville, AR	L 3–9	50–9	17–3
May 2	at Arkansas	George Cole Field • Fayetteville, AR	W 4–1	51–9	18–3

Postseason

SWC Tournament
Date	Opponent	Site/stadium	Score	Overall record	SWCT Record
May 15	Houston	Disch–Falk Field • Austin, TX	W 4–3	52–9	1–0
May 17	Arkansas	Disch–Falk Field • Austin, TX	W 10–3	53–9	2–0
May 18	Arkansas	Disch–Falk Field • Austin, TX	W 3–2	54–9	3–0

NCAA Central Regional
Date	Opponent	Site/stadium	Score	Overall record	NCAAT record
May 21	Lamar	Disch–Falk Field • Austin, TX	W 6–5	55–9	1–0
May 22	Oklahoma	Disch–Falk Field • Austin, TX	W 10–5	56–9	2–0
May 23	Houston	Disch–Falk Field • Austin, TX	W 15–3	57–9	3–0
May 24	Houston	Disch–Falk Field • Austin, TX	W 13–4	58–9	4–0

College World Series
Date	Opponent	Site/stadium	Score	Overall record	CWS record
May 30	Arkansas	Johnny Rosenblatt Stadium • Omaha, NE	W 13–6	59–9	1–0
June 2	Stanford	Johnny Rosenblatt Stadium • Omaha, NE	L 1–6	59–10	1–1
June 3	Florida State	Johnny Rosenblatt Stadium • Omaha, NE	W 6–4^{10}	60–10	2–1
June 5	Oklahoma State	Johnny Rosenblatt Stadium • Omaha, NE	W 6–5	61–10	3–1
June 6	Stanford	Johnny Rosenblatt Stadium • Omaha, NE	L 3–9	61–11	3–2
