= 1987 Arkansas Razorbacks baseball team =

American college baseball season

1987 Arkansas Razorbacks baseball

NCAA South I Regional champion

College World Series, 5th (tie)
- Conference: Southwest Conference
- Record: 51–16–1 (17–4 SWC)
- Head coach: Norm DeBriyn (18th season)
- Home stadium: George Cole Field

1987 Southwest Conference baseball standings
	Conf.				Overall
Team	W		L	PCT	W		L	PCT
No. 3 Texas ‍†‍‡‍^{y}	18	–	3	.857	61	–	11	.847
No. 5 Arkansas ‍‍‍^{y}	17	–	4	.810	51	–	16	.761
No. 13 Texas A&M ‍‍‍^{y}	14	–	7	.667	44	–	22	.667
No. 14 Houston ‍‍‍^{y}	11	–	10	.524	40	–	24	.625
Baylor ‍‍‍	9	–	12	.429	38	–	15	.717
Texas Tech ‍‍‍	7	–	14	.333	21	–	28	.429
Rice ‍‍‍	5	–	16	.238	23	–	23	.500
TCU ‍‍‍	4	–	17	.190	24	–	35	.407
† – Conference champion ‡ – Tournament champion y – Invited to the NCAA tournament As of June 30, 1987; Rankings from Collegiate Baseball

The 1987 Arkansas Razorbacks baseball team represented the University of Arkansas in the 1987 NCAA Division I baseball season. The Razorbacks were coached by Norm DeBriyn, in his 18th season with the Razorbacks, and played their home games at George Cole Field.

== Schedule and results ==
Legend
	Arkansas win
	Arkansas loss
	Postponement
**Bold**	Arkansas team member

1987 Arkansas Razorbacks baseball game log
Regular season

February (6–3–1)
Date	Opponent	Site/stadium	Score	Overall record	SWC record
February 14	at Memphis*	Nat Buring Stadium; Memphis, Tennessee	**W** 3–1	1–0	
February 14	at Memphis*	Nat Buring Stadium	**T** 2–2	1–0–1	
February 21	Memphis*	George Cole Field; Fayetteville, Arkansas	**W** 21–5	2–0–1	
February 22	Memphis*	George Cole Field	**W** 14–7	3–0–1	
February 23	Missouri Southern*	George Cole Field	**W** 4–3	4–0–1	
February 23	Missouri Southern*	George Cole Field	**W** 13–10	5–0–1	
February 25	vs. Hawaii Pacific*	Rainbow Stadium; Honolulu, Hawaii	**L** 4–6	5–1–1	
February 26	vs. Hawaii Pacific*	Rainbow Stadium	**W** 10–7	6–1–1	
February 27	at Hawaii*	Rainbow Stadium	**L** 4–8	6–2–1	
February 28	at Hawaii*	Rainbow Stadium	**L** 5–6 (10)	6–3–1	

March (18–4)
Date	Opponent	Site/stadium	Score	Overall record	SWC record
March 1	at Hawaii*	Rainbow Stadium	**W** 9–7 (10)	7–3–1	
March 2	at Hawaii*	Rainbow Stadium	**W** 7–4	8–3–1	
March 6	Kansas State*	George Cole Field	**L** 3–4	8–4–1	
March 7	Kansas State*	George Cole Field	**W** 12–7	9–4–1	
March 8	North Texas*	George Cole Field	**W** 13–4	10–4–1	
March 9	Lubbock Christian*	George Cole Field	**W** 13–3	11–4–1	
March 10	Saint Louis*	George Cole Field	**W** 20–10	12–4–1	
March 11	Saint Louis*	George Cole Field	**W** 9–0	13–4–1	
March 11	Saint Louis*	George Cole Field	**W** 15–5	14–4–1	
March 13	Northern Iowa*	George Cole Field	**W** 10–3	15–4–1	
March 14	Western Kentucky*	George Cole Field	**W** 8–3	16–4–1	
March 15	Western Kentucky*	George Cole Field	**W** 5–2	17–4–1	
March 15	Washington State*	George Cole Field	**L** 5–11	17–5–1	
March 20	at Texas A&M	Olsen Field; College Station, Texas	**W** 17–10	18–5–1	1–0
March 21	at Texas A&M	Olsen Field	**W** 8–2	19–5–1	2–0
March 22	at Texas A&M	Olsen Field	**W** 7–3	20–5–1	3–0
March 25	at Oklahoma State*	Allie P. Reynolds Stadium; Stillwater, Oklahoma	**L** 1–8	20–6–1	
March 27	Houston	George Cole Field	**L** 3–4	20–7–1	3–1
March 28	Houston	George Cole Field	**W** 10–3	21–7–1	4–1
March 28	Houston	George Cole Field	**W** 12–6	22–7–1	5–1
March 31	Missouri–St. Louis*	George Cole Field	**W** 11–2	23–7–1	
March 31	Missouri–St. Louis*	George Cole Field	**W** 14–2	24–7–1	

April (17–1)
Date	Opponent	Site/stadium	Score	Overall record	SWC record
April 3	at Texas Tech	Dan Law Field; Lubbock, Texas	**W** 2–0	25–7–1	6–1
April 4	at Texas Tech	Dan Law Field	**W** 8–6	26–7–1	7–1
April 4	at Texas Tech	Dan Law Field	**W** 9–0	27–7–1	8–1
April 7	Evangel*	George Cole Field	**W** 16–2	28–7–1	
April 10	at TCU	TCU Diamond; Fort Worth, Texas	**W** 9–7	29–7–1	9–1
April 11	at TCU	TCU Diamond	**L** 6–7	29–8–1	9–2
April 11	at TCU	TCU Diamond	**W** 13–7	30–8–1	10–2
April 15	Oklahoma*	George Cole Field	**W** 12–11	31–8–1	
April 17	Baylor	George Cole Field	**W** 5–3	32–8–1	11–2
April 18	Baylor	George Cole Field	**W** 8–0	33–8–1	12–2
April 18	Baylor	George Cole Field	**W** 6–5	34–8–1	13–2
April 20	School of the Ozarks*	George Cole Field	**W** 12–1	35–8–1	
April 21	Oklahoma State*	George Cole Field	**W** 9–8	36–8–1	
April 24	at Rice	Cameron Field; Houston, Texas	**W** 4–3	37–8–1	14–2
April 25	at Rice	Cameron Field	**W** 5–1	38–8–1	15–2
April 25	at Rice	Cameron Field	**W** 3–0	39–8–1	16–2
April 28	Southeastern Oklahoma State*	George Cole Field	**W** 14–10	40–8–1	
April 29	Missouri Southern*	George Cole Field	**W** 20–5	41–8–1	

May (3–4)
Date	Opponent	Site/stadium	Score	Overall record	SWC record
May 1	Texas	George Cole Field	**L** 5–9	41–9–1	16–3
May 2	Texas	George Cole Field	**W** 9–3	42–9–1	17–3
May 2	Texas	George Cole Field	**L** 1–4	42–10–1	17–4
May 7	Oral Roberts*	George Cole Field	**W** 14–4	43–10–1	
May 8	Oral Roberts*	George Cole Field	**W** 17–4	44–10–1	
May 10	at Oral Roberts*	J. L. Johnson Stadium; Tulsa, Oklahoma	**L** 2–10	44–11–1	
May 10	at Missouri*	Simmons Field; Columbia, Missouri	**L** 11–12 (10)	44–12–1	

Postseason

SWC Tournament (2–2)
Date	Opponent	Site/stadium	Score	Overall record	SWCT Record
May 15	vs. Texas A&M	Disch–Falk Field; Austin, Texas	**W** 4–3	45–12–1	1–0
May 17	at Texas	Disch–Falk Field	**L** 3–10	45–13–1	1–1
May 17	vs. Houston	Disch–Falk Field	**W** 14–9	46–13–1	2–1
May 18	at Texas	Disch–Falk Field	**L** 2–3	46–14–1	2–2

NCAA South I Regional (4–0)
Date	Opponent	Site/stadium	Score	Overall record	NCAAT record
May 22	vs. Middle Tennessee*	Joe W. Davis Stadium; Huntsville, Alabama	**W** 10–7	47–14–1	1–0
May 22	vs. West Virginia*	Joe W. Davis Stadium	**W** 7–2	48–14–1	2–0
May 23	vs. Clemson*	Joe W. Davis Stadium	**W** 6–5 (10)	49–14–1	3–0
May 24	vs. Clemson*	Joe W. Davis Stadium	**W** 4–2	50–14–1	4–0

College World Series (1–2)
Date	Opponent	Site/stadium	Score	Overall record	CWS record
May 30	vs. Texas	Johnny Rosenblatt Stadium; Omaha, Nebraska	**L** 6–13	50–15–1	0–1
May 31	vs. Georgia*	Johnny Rosenblatt Stadium	**W** 5–4	51–15–1	1–1
June 3	vs. LSU*	Johnny Rosenblatt Stadium	**L** 2–5	51–16–1	1–2

*Denotes non–conference game • Schedule source
