= 1987 Arizona State Sun Devils baseball team =

American college baseball season

1987 Arizona State Sun Devils baseball

NCAA West II Regional champions

College World Series, 0–2
- Conference: Pacific-10 Conference
- Record: 40–27 (16–14 Pac-10)
- Head coach: Jim Brock (16th year)
- Home stadium: Packard Stadium

1987 Pacific-10 Conference baseball standings
	Conf.				Overall
Team	W		L	PCT	W		L	PCT
Northern
No. 18 Washington State ^{x}‍‍‍^{y}	18	–	6	.750	44	–	19	.698
Oregon State ‍‍‍	15	–	9	.625	31	–	15	.674
Portland State ‍‍‍	13	–	11	.542	37	–	20	.649
Portland ‍‍‍	12	–	12	.500	30	–	22	.577
Washington ‍‍‍	11	–	13	.458	21	–	20	.512
Gonzaga ‍‍‍	8	–	16	.333	20	–	32	.385
Eastern Washington ‍‍‍	7	–	17	.292	24	–	32	.429
Southern
No. 1 Stanford ^{x}‍‍‍^{y}	21	–	9	.700	53	–	17	.757
No. 12 UCLA ‍‍‍^{y}	16	–	14	.533	40	–	25	.615
No. 8 Arizona State ‍‍‍^{y}	16	–	14	.533	40	–	27	.597
Arizona ‍‍‍^{y}	13	–	17	.433	34	–	26	.567
California ‍‍‍	12	–	18	.400	36	–	25	.590
Southern California ‍‍‍	12	–	18	.400	32	–	28	.533
x – Division champion y – Invited to the NCAA tournament As of June 30, 1987; Rankings from Collegiate Baseball

The 1987 Arizona State Sun Devils baseball team represented Arizona State University in the 1987 NCAA Division I baseball season. The Sun Devils played their home games at Packard Stadium, and played as part of the Pacific-10 Conference. The team was coached by Jim Brock in his sixteenth season as head coach at Arizona State.

The Sun Devils reached the College World Series, their fourteenth appearance in Omaha, where they finished tied for seventh place after losing to eventual runner-up Oklahoma State and fifth place Florida State.

== Personnel ==
=== Roster ===
1987 Arizona State Sun Devils roster
Pitchers: - David Cassidy; - Blas Minor; - Tony Harris; - Linty Ingram; - Mike Schwabe; Catchers: - Tim Spehr	Infielders: - Mike Benjamin; - Ted Dyson - Senior; - Tim Esmay; - John Finn; Outfielders: - Mike Burrola; - Dan Rumsey; - Brian Coleman	Unknown: - Jason Bridges; - Bob Dombrowski; - Karl Ermisch; - Gordy Farmer; - Scott Hutson; - Steve Mariucci; - Tony Mattia; - Martin Peralta; - Lloyd Ransom; - Bill Schorr; - Matt Shiflett; - Dwight Thomas; - Joe Thomas

=== Coaches ===
1987 Arizona State Sun Devils baseball coaching staff
- Jim Brock - Head coach - 16th year

== Schedule and results ==
Legend
Arizona State win
Arizona State loss

1987 Arizona State Sun Devils baseball game log
Regular season

January/February
Date	Opponent	Site/stadium	Score	Overall record	Pac-10 record
Jan 31	San Francisco*	Packard Stadium • Tempe, AZ	W 20–1	1–0	
Feb 2	Cal Poly Pomona*	Packard Stadium • Tempe, AZ	W 7–0	2–0	
Feb 3	Cal Poly Pomona*	Packard Stadium • Tempe, AZ	W 7–1	3–0	
Feb 5	Cal State Los Angeles*	Packard Stadium • Tempe, AZ	W 17–3	4–0	
Feb 6	Cal State Los Angeles*	Packard Stadium • Tempe, AZ	L 10–11	4–1	
Feb 7	Cal State Los Angeles*	Packard Stadium • Tempe, AZ	W 9–4	5–1	
Feb 12	Loyola Marymount*	Packard Stadium • Tempe, AZ	L 5–8	5–2	
Feb 13	Loyola Marymount*	Packard Stadium • Tempe, AZ	L 3–4	5–3	
Feb 14	Loyola Marymount*	Packard Stadium • Tempe, AZ	W 13–12	6–3	
Feb 16	UC Riverside*	Packard Stadium • Tempe, AZ	W 14–2	7–3	
Feb 17	UC Riverside*	Packard Stadium • Tempe, AZ	L 6–8	7–4	
Feb 19	Texas*	Packard Stadium • Tempe, AZ	L 4–7	7–5	
Feb 20	Texas*	Packard Stadium • Tempe, AZ	W 6–5	8–5	
Feb 21	Texas*	Packard Stadium • Tempe, AZ	L 2–11	8–6	
Feb 23	Cal State Northridge*	Packard Stadium • Tempe, AZ	L 2–3	8–7	
Feb 27	at Southern California	Dedeaux Field • Los Angeles, CA	L 4–6	8–8	0–1
Feb 28	at Southern California	Dedeaux Field • Los Angeles, CA	L 2–6	8–9	0–2

March
Date	Opponent	Site/stadium	Score	Overall record	Pac-10 record
Mar 1	at Southern California	Dedeaux Field • Los Angeles, CA	L 8–11	8–10	0–3
Mar 6	UCLA	Packard Stadium • Tempe, AZ	W 11–6	9–10	1–3
Mar 7	UCLA	Packard Stadium • Tempe, AZ	L 2–3	9–11	1–4
Mar 8	UCLA	Packard Stadium • Tempe, AZ	L 5–12	9–12	1–5
Mar 13	Hawaii*	Packard Stadium • Tempe, AZ	L 1–3	9–13	
Mar 14	Hawaii*	Packard Stadium • Tempe, AZ	W 9–5	10–13	
Mar 15	Hawaii*	Packard Stadium • Tempe, AZ	W 7–1	11–13	
Mar 17	Azusa Pacific*	Packard Stadium • Tempe, AZ	W 6–5	12–13	
Mar 18	Azusa Pacific*	Packard Stadium • Tempe, AZ	W 8–6	13–13	
Mar 20	at Arizona	Wildcat Field • Tucson, AZ	W 8–5	14–13	2–5
Mar 21	at Arizona	Wildcat Field • Tucson, AZ	W 10–2	15–13	3–5
Mar 22	at Arizona	Wildcat Field • Tucson, AZ	W 15–4	16–13	4–5
Mar 24	Nebraska*	Packard Stadium • Tempe, AZ	W 6–3	17–13	
Mar 25	Nebraska*	Packard Stadium • Tempe, AZ	L 1–4	17–14	
Mar 27	at Stanford	Sunken Diamond • Stanford, CA	L 3–10	17–15	4–6
Mar 28	at Stanford	Sunken Diamond • Stanford, CA	L 2–3	17–16	4–7
Mar 29	at Stanford	Sunken Diamond • Stanford, CA	L 6–12	17–17	5–7
Mar 31	Grand Canyon*	Packard Stadium • Tempe, AZ	W 11–3	18–17	

April
Date	Opponent	Site/stadium	Score	Overall record	Pac-10 record
Apr 1	US International*	Packard Stadium • Tempe, AZ	L 5–7	18–18	
Apr 3	California	Packard Stadium • Tempe, AZ	W 7–8	19–18	6–7
Apr 4	California	Packard Stadium • Tempe, AZ	W 8–1	20–18	7–7
Apr 5	California	Packard Stadium • Tempe, AZ	W 10–7	21–18	8–7
Apr 7	at Grand Canyon*	Brazell Stadium • Phoenix, AZ	W 3–0	22–18	
Apr 10	Southern California	Packard Stadium • Tempe, AZ	W 6–3	23–18	9–7
Apr 11	Southern California	Packard Stadium • Tempe, AZ	L 1–8	23–19	9–8
Apr 12	Southern California	Packard Stadium • Tempe, AZ	W 11–6	24–19	10–8
Apr 16	at UCLA	Jackie Robinson Stadium • Los Angeles, CA	L 12–13	24–20	10–9
Apr 17	at UCLA	Jackie Robinson Stadium • Los Angeles, CA	L 10–11	24–21	10–10
Apr 18	at UCLA	Jackie Robinson Stadium • Los Angeles, CA	W 20–5	25–21	11–10
Apr 20	New Mexico State*	Packard Stadium • Tempe, AZ	W 8–1	26–21	
Apr 21	New Mexico State*	Packard Stadium • Tempe, AZ	W 15–5	27–21	
Apr 21	New Mexico State*	Packard Stadium • Tempe, AZ	W 9–5	28–21	
Apr 24	Stanford	Packard Stadium • Tempe, AZ	W 10–6	29–21	12–10
Apr 25	Stanford	Packard Stadium • Tempe, AZ	L 5–13	29–22	12–11
Apr 26	Stanford	Packard Stadium • Tempe, AZ	W 5–2	30–22	13–11
Apr 28	Grand Canyon*	Packard Stadium • Tempe, AZ	W 19–4	31–22	

May
Date	Opponent	Site/stadium	Score	Overall record	Pac-10 record
May 1	at California	Evans Diamond • Berkeley, CA	L 7–8	31–23	13–12
May 2	at California	Evans Diamond • Berkeley, CA	W 8–1	32–23	14–12
May 3	at California	Evans Diamond • Berkeley, CA	L 3–7	32–24	14–13
May 6	UNLV*	Packard Stadium • Tempe, AZ	L 2–3	32–25	
May 6	UNLV*	Packard Stadium • Tempe, AZ	W 8–1	33–25	
May 15	Arizona	Packard Stadium • Tempe, AZ	W 2–1^{10}	34–25	15–13
May 16	Arizona	Packard Stadium • Tempe, AZ	W 3–2^{10}	35–25	16–13
May 17	Arizona	Packard Stadium • Tempe, AZ	W 5–4	36–25	17–13

Postseason

NCAA West II Regional
Date	Opponent	Site/stadium	Score	Overall record	Reg Record
May 22	Southwest Missouri State	Packard Stadium • Tempe, AZ	W 9–5	37–25	1–0
May 23	UCLA	Packard Stadium • Tempe, AZ	W 9–3	38–25	2–0
May 23	Pepperdine	Packard Stadium • Tempe, AZ	W 4–2	39–25	3–0
May 24	UCLA	Packard Stadium • Tempe, AZ	W 14–4	40–25	4–0

College World Series
Date	Opponent	Site/stadium	Score	Overall record	CWS record
May 29	Oklahoma State	Johnny Rosenblatt Stadium • Omaha, NE	L 3–8	40–26	0–1
May 31	Florida State	Johnny Rosenblatt Stadium • Omaha, NE	L 0–3	40–27	0–2
