= 1987 LSU Tigers baseball team =

American college baseball season

1987 LSU Tigers baseball

NCAA South II Regional champions

College World Series, 2–2
- Conference: Southeastern Conference
- Record: 55–14 (22–5 SEC)
- Head coach: Skip Bertman (4th year)
- Home stadium: Alex Box Stadium

1987 Southeastern Conference baseball standings
| | Conf. | | | | Overall |
| Team | W | | L | PCT | W | | L | PCT |
|---|---|---|---|---|---|---|---|---|
| No. 7 Georgia ‍†‍‍^{y} | 18 | – | 8 | .692 | 42 | – | 21 | .667 |
| No. 20 Auburn ‍‍‍^{y} | 18 | – | 9 | .667 | 42 | – | 18 | .700 |
| Florida ‍‍‍ | 17 | – | 9 | .654 | 32 | – | 24 | .571 |
| Kentucky ‍‍‍ | 16 | – | 11 | .593 | 40 | – | 15 | .727 |
| No. 4 LSU ‍‍‍^{y} | 12 | – | 10 | .545 | 49 | – | 19 | .721 |
| Mississippi State ‍‍‡‍^{y} | 13 | – | 13 | .500 | 39 | – | 22 | .639 |
| Alabama ‍‍‍ | 11 | – | 14 | .440 | 25 | – | 26 | .490 |
| Ole Miss ‍‍‍ | 11 | – | 16 | .407 | 25 | – | 26 | .490 |
| Vanderbilt ‍‍‍ | 7 | – | 20 | .259 | 27 | – | 25 | .519 |
| Tennessee ‍‍‍ | 5 | – | 18 | .217 | 17 | – | 27 | .386 |
† – Conference champion ‡ – Tournament champion y – Invited to the NCAA tournament As of June 30, 1987; Rankings from Collegiate Baseball

The 1987 LSU Tigers baseball team represented Louisiana State University in the 1987 NCAA Division I baseball season. The Tigers played their home games at Alex Box Stadium, and played as part of the Southeastern Conference. The team was coached by Skip Bertman in his fourth season as head coach at LSU.

The Tigers reached the College World Series, their second appearance in Omaha, where they finished 4th after wins against Florida State and Arkansas and losses to eventual runner-up Oklahoma State and eventual champion Stanford.

== Personnel ==
=== Roster ===
1987 LSU Tigers roster
| Pitchers: 2 - Greg Naquin - Junior; 14 - Andy Berg - Junior; 19 - Ben McDonald - Freshman; 21 - Stan Loewer - Senior; 29 - Dondi Quarles - Freshman; 30 - Gregg Patterson - Junior; 32 - Randy LaRose - Senior; 33 - Russ Springer - Freshman; 35 - Joe Zimmerman - Senior; 36 - Dan Kite - Sophomore; 39 - Barry Manuel - Junior; 40 - Willie Forbes - Senior; 44 - Mark Guthrie - Senior | Catchers: 16 - Daniel Edwards - Freshman; 28 - Joe Lewis - Freshman; 41 - Warren Bankston - Freshman; 51 - Craig Faulkner - Senior; Outfielders: 8 - Joey Belle - Junior; 9 - Todd Waggoner - Sophomore; 10 - Michael Papajohn - Senior; 12 - Terry Belle - Junior; 13 - Brad Duplantis - Junior; 17 - Rich Vasquez - Junior; 23 - Rob Hartwig - Senior | Infielders: 1 - Dave Cunningham - Junior; 3 - Wayne Stofsky - Sophomore; 4 - Andy Galy - Junior; 7 - Brian Wilhite - Junior; 20 - Shawn Jenkins - Junior; 27 - Pete Bush - Sophomore; 37 - Jack Voigt - Junior |

=== Coaches ===
1987 LSU Tigers baseball coaching staff
- Skip Bertman - Head coach - 4th Season
- Tom Brown - Assistant coach - 4th season
- Smoke Laval - Assistant coach - 4th Season
- Cliff Dees - Graduate Assistant Coach
- Jim Wells - Graduate Assistant Coach - 1st season

== Schedule and results ==
Legend
| LSU win |
| LSU loss |

1987 LSU Tigers baseball game log
Regular season

February
| Date | Opponent | Site/Stadium | Score | Overall Record | SEC Record |
|---|---|---|---|---|---|
| Feb 17 | Louisiana College* | Alex Box Stadium • Baton Rouge, LA | W 11–0 | 1–0 | |
| Feb 18 | Louisiana College* | Alex Box Stadium • Baton Rouge, LA | W 13–0 | 2–0 | |
| Feb 20 | vs Miami (FL)* | Louisiana Superdome • New Orleans, LA (Busch Challenge I) | L 2–7 | 2–1 | |
| Feb 21 | vs Florida* | Louisiana Superdome • New Orleans, LA (Busch Challenge I) | W 5–2 | 3–1 | |
| Feb 22 | vs Florida State* | Louisiana Superdome • New Orleans, LA (Busch Challenge I) | L 1–2 | 3–2 | |
| Feb 28 | Wichita State* | Alex Box Stadium • Baton Rouge, LA | W 14–6 | 4–2 | |

March
| Date | Opponent | Site/Stadium | Score | Overall Record | SEC Record |
|---|---|---|---|---|---|
| Mar 1 | Wichita State* | Alex Box Stadium • Baton Rouge, LA | W 12–2^{7} | 5–2 | |
| Mar 1 | Wichita State* | Alex Box Stadium • Baton Rouge, LA | W 9–3 | 6–2 | |
| Mar 4 | Southern* | Alex Box Stadium • Baton Rouge, LA | W 15–4 | 7–2 | |
| Mar 5 | Southwestern Louisiana* | Alex Box Stadium • Baton Rouge, LA | W 7–4 | 8–2 | |
| Mar 9 | Florida | Alex Box Stadium • Baton Rouge, LA | L 3–5^{7} | 8–3 | 0–1 |
| Mar 9 | Florida | Alex Box Stadium • Baton Rouge, LA | W 9–1^{7} | 9–3 | 1–1 |
| Mar 14 | at Kentucky | Cliff Hagan Stadium • Lexington, KY | L 2–7^{7} | 9–4 | 1–2 |
| Mar 14 | at Kentucky | Cliff Hagan Stadium • Lexington, KY | W 8–4^{7} | 10–4 | 2–2 |
| Mar 15 | at Kentucky | Cliff Hagan Stadium • Lexington, KY | W 5–0 | 11–4 | 3–2 |
| Mar 18 | Texas–Arlington* | Alex Box Stadium • Baton Rouge, LA | W 4–3 | 12–4 | |
| Mar 18 | Texas–Arlington* | Alex Box Stadium • Baton Rouge, LA | W 17–2 | 13–4 | |
| Mar 19 | Missouri* | Alex Box Stadium • Baton Rouge, LA | W 8–5 | 14–4 | |
| Mar 20 | Oral Roberts* | Alex Box Stadium • Baton Rouge, LA | W 20–5 | 15–4 | |
| Mar 21 | Oral Roberts* | Alex Box Stadium • Baton Rouge, LA | W 14–4 | 16–4 | |
| Mar 22 | McNeese State* | Alex Box Stadium • Baton Rouge, LA | W 17–7 | 17–4 | |
| Mar 24 | Nicholls State* | Alex Box Stadium • Baton Rouge, LA | W 10–7 | 18–4 | |
| Mar 25 | New Orleans* | Alex Box Stadium • Baton Rouge, LA | W 8–7 | 19–4 | |
| Mar 26 | Southeastern Louisiana* | Alex Box Stadium • Baton Rouge, LA | W 11–3 | 20–4 | |
| Mar 28 | Alabama | Alex Box Stadium • Baton Rouge, LA | L 0–1^{7} | 20–5 | 3–3 |
| Mar 28 | Alabama | Alex Box Stadium • Baton Rouge, LA | W 4–3^{7} | 21–5 | 4–3 |
| Mar 31 | Northeast Louisiana* | Alex Box Stadium • Baton Rouge, LA | W 15–0 | 22–5 | |

April
| Date | Opponent | Site/Stadium | Score | Overall Record | SEC Record |
|---|---|---|---|---|---|
| Apr 1 | Centenary* | Alex Box Stadium • Baton Rouge, LA | W 11–3 | 23–5 | |
| Apr 7 | Southern* | Alex Box Stadium • Baton Rouge, LA | W 15–4 | 24–5 | |
| Apr 8 | at Tulane* | Tulane Diamond • New Orleans, LA | W 5–4^{15} | 25–5 | |
| Apr 11 | at Ole Miss | Swayze Field • Oxford, MS | L 0–4^{7} | 25–6 | 4–4 |
| Apr 11 | at Ole Miss | Swayze Field • Oxford, MS | L 5–6 | 25–7 | 4–5 |
| Apr 12 | at Ole Miss | Swayze Field • Oxford, MS | W 6–3 | 26–7 | 5–5 |
| Apr 14 | vs Centenary* | Fair Grounds Field • Shreveport, LA | W 10–3 | 27–7 | |
| Apr 15 | at Northeast Louisiana* | Lou St. Amant Field • Monroe, LA | W 9–3 | 28–7 | |
| Apr 16 | at Louisiana Tech* | J. C. Love Field • Ruston, LA | L 4–5^{10} | 28–8 | |
| Apr 18 | Mississippi State | Alex Box Stadium • Baton Rouge, LA | L 4–5^{7} | 28–9 | 5–6 |
| Apr 18 | Mississippi State | Alex Box Stadium • Baton Rouge, LA | W 6–4^{7} | 29–9 | 6–6 |
| Apr 19 | Mississippi State | Alex Box Stadium • Baton Rouge, LA | W 6–5 | 30–9 | 7–6 |
| Apr 20 | Nicholls State* | Alex Box Stadium • Baton Rouge, LA | W 10–5 | 31–9 | |
| Apr 21 | Tulane* | Alex Box Stadium • Baton Rouge, LA | L 7–9 | 31–10 | |
| Apr 22 | Northwestern State* | Alex Box Stadium • Baton Rouge, LA | W 11–0^{6} | 32–10 | |
| Apr 22 | Northwestern State* | Alex Box Stadium • Baton Rouge, LA | W 8–7 | 33–10 | |
| Apr 25 | at Georgia | Foley Field • Athens, GA | L 1–7^{7} | 33–11 | 7–7 |
| Apr 25 | at Georgia | Foley Field • Athens, GA | W 12–3^{7} | 34–11 | 8–7 |
| Apr 26 | at Georgia | Foley Field • Athens, GA | L 10–12 | 34–12 | 8–8 |
| Apr 27 | Southeastern Louisiana* | Alex Box Stadium • Baton Rouge, LA | W 14–4 | 35–12 | |
| Apr 29 | at New Orleans* | Privateer Park • New Orleans, LA | L 1–3 | 35–13 | |

May
| Date | Opponent | Site/Stadium | Score | Overall Record | SEC Record |
|---|---|---|---|---|---|
| May 1 | at Nicholls State* | Ben Meyer Diamond at Ray E. Didier Field • Thibodaux, LA | W 10–2 | 36–13 | |
| May 2 | Vanderbilt | Alex Box Stadium • Baton Rouge, LA | L 2–4^{7} | 36–14 | 8–9 |
| May 2 | Vanderbilt | Alex Box Stadium • Baton Rouge, LA | W 1–0^{7} | 37–14 | 9–9 |
| May 3 | Vanderbilt | Alex Box Stadium • Baton Rouge, LA | W 11–8 | 38–14 | 10–9 |
| May 9 | at Auburn | Plainsman Park • Auburn, AL | W 4–0^{7} | 39–14 | 11–9 |
| May 9 | at Auburn | Plainsman Park • Auburn, AL | W 6–1^{7} | 40–14 | 12–9 |
| May 10 | at Auburn | Plainsman Park • Auburn, AL | L 1–6 | 40–15 | 12–10 |

Postseason

SEC Tournament
| Date | Opponent | Seed | Site/Stadium | Score | Overall Record | SECT Record |
|---|---|---|---|---|---|---|
| May 14 | (2) Auburn | (5) | Foley Field • Athens, GA | L 8–9 | 40–16 | 0–1 |
| May 15 | (1) Georgia | (5) | Foley Field • Athens, GA | W 4–2 | 41–16 | 1–1 |
| May 16 | (4) Kentucky | (5) | Foley Field • Athens, GA | W 4–1 | 42–16 | 2–1 |
| May 16 | (2) Auburn | (5) | Foley Field • Athens, GA | W 4–2 | 43–16 | 3–1 |
| May 17 | (6) Mississippi State | (5) | Foley Field • Athens, GA | L 3–13 | 43–17 | 3–2 |

NCAA South II Regional
| Date | Opponent | Seed | Site/Stadium | Score | Overall Record | Reg Record |
|---|---|---|---|---|---|---|
| May 21 | Tulane | Privateer Park • New Orleans, LA | W 5–3 | 44–17 | 1–0 | |
| May 22 | New Orleans | Privateer Park • New Orleans, LA | W 14–1 | 45–17 | 2–0 | |
| May 23 | New Orleans | Privateer Park • New Orleans, LA | W 3–0 | 46–17 | 3–0 | |
| May 24 | Cal State Fullerton | Privateer Park • New Orleans, LA | W 7–3 | 47–17 | 4–0 | |

College World Series
| Date | Opponent | Site/Stadium | Score | Overall Record | CWS Record |
|---|---|---|---|---|---|
| May 29 | Florida State | Johnny Rosenblatt Stadium • Omaha, NE | W 6–2^{10} | 48–17 | 1–0 |
| June 1 | Oklahoma State | Johnny Rosenblatt Stadium • Omaha, NE | L 7–8 | 48–18 | 1–1 |
| June 3 | Arkansas | Johnny Rosenblatt Stadium • Omaha, NE | W 5–2 | 49–18 | 2–1 |
| June 2 | Stanford | Johnny Rosenblatt Stadium • Omaha, NE | L 5–6^{10} | 49–19 | 2–2 |
