= Steve Chitren =

American baseball player (born 1967)

- Pitcher
- Born: June 8, 1967 (age 59); Tokyo, Japan
- Batted: Right Threw: Right

MLB debut
- September 5, 1990, for the Oakland Athletics

Last MLB appearance
- October 2, 1991, for the Oakland Athletics

MLB statistics
- Win–loss record: 2–4
- Earned run average: 3.58
- Strikeouts: 66
- Stats at Baseball Reference

Teams
- Oakland Athletics (1990–1991)

Stephen Vincent Chitren (born June 8, 1967) is a former professional baseball pitcher. He played in Major League Baseball (MLB) for the Oakland Athletics during the 1990 and 1991 seasons.

Chitren was born in Japan in 1967 where his father was stationed with the United States Air Force. His father was subsequently transferred to Las Vegas where Chitren grew up.

Chitren played college baseball at Stanford where he set the school records for most saves in a season and in a career. Chitren was also on the mound for the clinching outs of the 1987 and 1988 College World Series. In the 1987 series, he got a six-out save in the championship game. He earned a Bachelor of Arts in biology from the university.

He was selected by the Oakland Athletics in the sixth round of the 1989 Major League Baseball draft. He was assigned to the Southern Oregon A's of the Northwest League to begin his professional career. He spent the majority of the 1990 season with the Huntsville Stars and led in the Southern League with 27 saves. He was the lone relief pitcher named to the postseason all-league team.

Chitren made his Major League debut on September 5, 1990, at Fenway Park against the Boston Red Sox. He pitched a scoreless inning in relief of Bob Welch and struck out the first batter he faced, Scott Cooper. In the following season, he was a regular in the Oakland bullpen. He appeared in the third-most games of any pitcher on the team behind only Dennis Eckersley and Joe Klink.

Chitren would not return to the Major Leagues after the 1991 season. He spent the entirety of the 1992 and 1993 seasons in the Oakland farm system and the 1994 and 1995 seasons in the Baltimore Orioles system. In 1995, he pitched in one game for the Amarillo Dillas of the independent Texas–Louisiana League. It would be his final game in professional baseball.
