= Matt Dunbar =

American baseball player (born 1968)

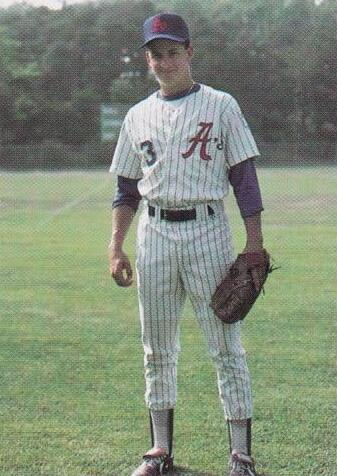
- Dunbar with the Chatham Athletics in 1988
- Pitcher
- Born: October 15, 1968 (age 57); Tallahassee, Florida, U.S.
- Batted: Left Threw: Left

MLB debut
- April 25, 1995, for the Florida Marlins

Last MLB appearance
- May 20, 1995, for the Florida Marlins

MLB statistics
- Win–loss record: 0–1
- Earned run average: 11.57
- Strikeouts: 5
- Stats at Baseball Reference

Teams
- Florida Marlins (1995)

Matthew Marshall Dunbar (born October 15, 1968) is an American former Major League Baseball (MLB) pitcher who played for the Florida Marlins in 1995.

== Biography ==
A native of Tallahassee, Florida, Dunbar attended Dunedin High School and Florida State University. In 1988, he played collegiate summer baseball with the Chatham A's of the Cape Cod Baseball League. He was drafted by the New York Yankees in the 25th round of the 1990 amateur draft.

Dunbar played his first professional season with the Class A (Short Season) Oneonta Yankees in 1990. He made his major league debut with the Marlins in 1995, and appeared in eight games for the team that season. His final professional season was spent with the Pittsburgh Pirates' Double-A Altoona Curve and Triple-A Nashville Sounds in 1999.
