= Brian Keyser =

American baseball player (born 1966)

- Pitcher
- Born: October 31, 1966 (age 59); Castro Valley, California, U.S.
- Batted: Right Threw: Right

MLB debut
- June 2, 1995, for the Chicago White Sox

Last MLB appearance
- September 29, 1996, for the Chicago White Sox

MLB statistics
- Win–loss record: 6–8
- Earned run average: 4.97
- Strikeouts: 67
- Stats at Baseball Reference

Teams
- Chicago White Sox (1995–1996)

Brian Lee Keyser (born October 31, 1966) is an American former Major League Baseball pitcher. He played during two seasons at the major league level for the Chicago White Sox. He was drafted by the White Sox in the 19th round of the 1989 amateur draft. Keyser played his first professional season with their Class A (Short Season) Utica Blue Sox in 1989, and his last season with the Cincinnati Reds' Triple-A club, the Indianapolis Indians, in 1998. On May 15, 1996, Keyser picked up his only major league save during a 20–8 blowout White Sox win over the Brewers. Keyser pitched the final four innings and saved the game for starter Wilson Alvarez.
