= Paul Carey (baseball) =

American baseball player (born 1968)

- First baseman/Designated hitter
- Born: January 8, 1968 (age 58); Boston, Massachusetts, U.S.
- Batted: Left Threw: Right

MLB debut
- May 25, 1993, for the Baltimore Orioles

Last MLB appearance
- October 3, 1993, for the Baltimore Orioles

MLB statistics
- Batting average: .213
- Home runs: 0
- Runs batted in: 3
- Stats at Baseball Reference

Teams
- Baltimore Orioles (1993)

Paul Stephen Carey (born January 8, 1968) is an American former Major League Baseball first baseman/designated hitter who played in 1993 for the Baltimore Orioles. He also managed in the minor leagues from 1998 to 2001. His brother is former NHL goalie Jim Carey.

== Early life ==
Carey was born in Boston, Massachusetts. He attended Boston College High School in Dorchester, Massachusetts and then Stanford University, where he was voted the 1987 College World Series Most Outstanding Player as a freshman outfielder on Stanford's national champion baseball team on the basis of going 3-for-5 with two RBI and scoring two runs in the title game in Omaha. Even before the final game against Oklahoma State, Carey had made a case for MOP when he smashed a walk-off opposite-field grand slam over the left-field fence in the 10th inning to give the Cardinal a 6-5 win over LSU. Carey is one of three players from Stanford University to win the MOP award (Lee Plemel and John Hudgins are the other two). He was inducted into the Stanford University Hall of Fame in 1990. In 1987, he played collegiate summer baseball with the Wareham Gatemen of the Cape Cod Baseball League.

== Playing career ==
He was selected in the 27th round of the 1986 draft by the Seattle Mariners but chose not to sign, and then by the Detroit Tigers in the fourth round of the 1989 draft, but again didn't sign. After being chosen by the Miami Miracle of the Florida State League in the fourth round of the 1990 draft, however, he did sign. 1990 was his first professional season; he hit .327 for Miami with four home runs and 20 RBI in 153 at-bats.

On March 18, 1991, the Baltimore Orioles purchased his contract from the Miracle. He played for the Hagerstown Suns in 1991, hitting .252 with 12 home runs and 65 RBI. In 1992, his hitting improved as he played for the Frederick Keys, Hagerstown Suns and Rochester Red Wings at different times. In 136 at-bats with the Keys, he hit .301 with nine home runs and 26 RBI. In 163 at-bats with the Suns, he hit .270 with four home runs and 18 RBI. In 87 at-bats with the Red Wings, however, he fell to .230 with one home run and seven RBI. Overall for 1992, he hit .272 with 14 home runs and 51 RBI.

He spent most of 1993 with the Red Wings, hitting .311 with 12 home runs and 50 RBI in 325 at-bats. On May 25, 1993 he made his major league debut against Bob Wickman and the New York Yankees. As the Orioles' DH, he went 1 for 3 in a losing effort. The Yankees won the game 1–0. He played in 18 games that season, collecting 10 hits in 47 at-bats for a .213 batting average. He played his final major league game on October 2, 1993.

Although his major league career was over, he played professionally until 1995. In 1994, he played for Frederick and Rochester, hitting a combined .279 with 14 home runs and 40 RBI in 226 at-bats. In 1995, he hit .236 with nine home runs and 50 RBI for the Red Wings.

Overall, he hit .275 with 65 home runs and 276 RBI in his six-year minor league career.

== Managing career ==
Carey managed in the minor leagues from 1998 to 2001. The following is his managerial record.

Year	Team	League	Record	Finish	Organization	Playoffs
1998	Savannah Sand Gnats	South Atlantic League	66–76	11th	Texas Rangers	--
1999	Savannah Sand Gnats	South Atlantic League	62–78	12th	Texas Rangers	--
2000	Savannah Sand Gnats	South Atlantic League	74–65	4th	Texas Rangers	--
2001	Tulsa Drillers	Texas League	69–70	5th	Texas Rangers	--
