= 1987 NCAA Division I baseball rankings =

1987 NCAA Division I baseball season

Tournament

College World Series
- Champions: Stanford
- Runners-up: Oklahoma State
- MOP: Paul Carey (Stanford)

Seasons
- ← 1986 1988 →

The following polls make up the 1987 NCAA Division I baseball rankings. Baseball America began publishing its poll of the top 20 teams in college baseball in 1981. Beginning with the 1985 season, it expanded to the top 25. Collegiate Baseball Newspaper published its first human poll of the top 20 teams in college baseball in 1957, and expanded to rank the top 30 teams in 1961.

== Baseball America ==
Currently, only the final poll from the 1987 season is available.

Rank	Team
1	Stanford
2	Oklahoma State
3	Texas
4	LSU
5	Arkansas
6	Florida State
7	Cal State Fullerton
8	Pepperdine
9	Georgia
10	Clemson
11	Arizona State
12	Texas A&M
13	Georgia Tech
14	Auburn
15	Oklahoma
16	UCLA
17	Washington State
18	Wichita State
19	Michigan
20	Hawaii
21	New Orleans
22	Oral Roberts
23	Mississippi State
24	Seton Hall
25	Miami (FL)

== Collegiate Baseball ==
Currently, only the final poll from the 1987 season is available.

Rank	Team
1	Stanford
2	Oklahoma State
3	Texas
4	LSU
5	Arkansas
6	Florida State
7	Georgia
8	Arizona State
9	Cal State Fullerton
10	Clemson
11	Oral Roberts
12	UCLA
13	Texas A&M
14	Houston
15	South Alabama
16	New Orleans
17	Pepperdine
18	Washington State
19	Hawaii
20	Auburn
21	Sam Houston State
22	Seton Hall
23	Michigan
24	Rider
25	Georgia Tech
26	Oklahoma
27	Louisiana Tech
28	Wichita State
29	Georgia Southern
30	Western Carolina
