= 1987 NCAA Division I baseball tournament =

- Season: 1987
- Teams: 48
- Finals site: Johnny Rosenblatt Stadium; Omaha, NE
- Champions: Stanford (1st title)
- Runner-up: Oklahoma State (15th CWS Appearance)
- Winning coach: Mark Marquess (1st title)
- MOP: Paul Carey (Stanford)
- Television: ESPN (College World Series)

The 1987 NCAA Division I baseball tournament was played at the end of the 1987 NCAA Division I baseball season to determine the national champion of college baseball. The tournament concluded with eight teams competing in the College World Series, a double-elimination tournament in its forty first year. Eight regional competitions were held to determine the participants in the final event. Each region was composed of six teams, resulting in 48 teams participating in the tournament at the conclusion of their regular season, and in some cases, after a conference tournament. The forty-first tournament's champion was Stanford, coached by Mark Marquess. The Most Outstanding Player was Paul Carey of Stanford.

== National seeds ==
For the first time, the NCAA selected eight national seeds and placed each in a different regional.

Bold indicates CWS participant.

- **Arkansas**
- Cal State Fullerton
- **Florida State**
- Georgia Tech
- **Oklahoma State**
- Pepperdine
- **Stanford**
- **Texas**

== Regionals ==
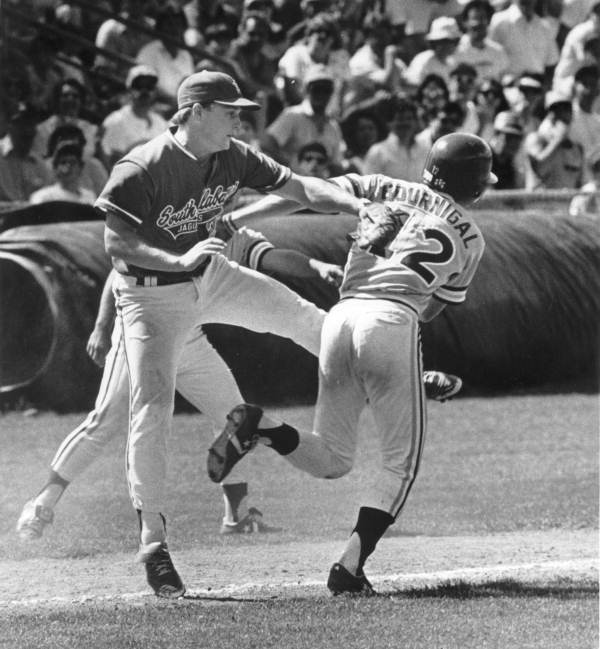
A game in the Atlantic Regional between South Alabama and Florida State

The opening rounds of the tournament were played across eight regional sites across the country, each consisting of six teams. The winners of each Regional advanced to the College World Series.

Bold indicates winner.

=== Atlantic Regional at Coral Gables, FL ===
First round
1	**Florida State**	**10**
6	East Carolina	5
2	**South Alabama**	**2**
5	Central Michigan	0
3	**Georgia Southern**	**11**
4	Miami (FL)	6

Second round
**Florida State**	**5**
Miami (FL)	2
**South Alabama**	**6**
Georgia Southern	1
East Carolina	9
**Central Michigan**	**17**

Third round
**Florida State**	**12**
South Alabama	3
**Georgia Southern**	**3**
Central Michigan	1

Semifinals
**South Alabama**	**3**
Georgia Southern	0

Final
**Florida State**	3	**9**
South Alabama	**6**	2

=== Central Regional at Austin, TX ===
First round
1	**Texas**	**6**^{10}
6	Lamar	5
2	**Sam Houston State**	**5**
5	Oklahoma	1
3	**Houston**	**10**
4	Indiana State	5

Second round
**Texas**	**10**
Oklahoma	5
**Houston**	**8**
Sam Houston State	4
**Indiana State**	**10**
Lamar	5

Third round
**Texas**	**15**
Houston	3
**Sam Houston State**	**10**
Indiana State	8

Semifinals
**Houston**	**4**
Sam Houston State	0

Final
**Texas**	**13**	—
Houston	4	—

=== Mideast Regional at Starkville, MS ===
First round
1	**Oklahoma State**	**6**
6	Western Carolina	3
2	**Mississippi State**	**10**
5	NC State	6
3	**Texas A&M**	**13**
4	Purdue	3

Second round
**Oklahoma State**	**8**
NC State	6
Mississippi State	4
**Texas A&M**	**7**
**Western Carolina**	**8**
Purdue	7

Third round
Oklahoma State	1
**Texas A&M**	**4**
Mississippi State	1
**Western Carolina**	**8**

Semifinals
**Oklahoma State**	**9**
Western Carolina	6

Final
Texas A&M	4	9
**Oklahoma State**	**7**	**11**

=== Northeast Regional at Atlanta, GA ===
First round
1	Georgia Tech	5
6	**Rider**	**8**
2	**Fordham**	**5**
5	Georgia	3
3	**Dartmouth**	**4**
4	Michigan	0

Second round
Rider	0
**Michigan**	**10**
Georgia Tech	1
**Georgia**	**5**
**Fordham**	**4**
Dartmouth	2
**Rider**	**6**
Dartmouth	3

Third round
Michigan	8
**Georgia**	**10**
Fordham	0
**Rider**	**12**

Semifinals
**Georgia**	**10**
Fordham	4

Final
Rider	5
**Georgia**	**13**

=== South I Regional at Huntsville, AL ===
First round
1	**Arkansas**	**10**
6	Middle Tennessee	7
2	**Seton Hall**	**15**
5	Auburn	6
3	**Clemson**	**8**
4	West Virginia	0

Second round
**Arkansas**	**7**
West Virginia	2
Seton Hall	3
**Clemson**	**6**
**Auburn**	**5**
Middle Tennessee	3

Third round
**Arkansas**	**6**
Clemson	5
Seton Hall	3
**Auburn**	**22**

Semifinals
**Clemson**	**6**
Auburn	3

Final
**Arkansas**	**4**	—
Clemson	2	—

=== South II Regional at New Orleans, LA ===
First round
1	Cal State Fullerton	0
6	**Southern**	**1**
2	**LSU**	**5**
5	Tulane	3
3	**New Orleans**	**18**
4	Louisiana Tech	5

Second round
Southern	2
**Louisiana Tech**	**5**
**Cal State Fullerton**	**4**
Tulane	0
**LSU**	**14**
New Orleans	1
**New Orleans**	**6**
Southern	2

Third round
Louisiana Tech	0
**Cal State Fullerton**	**11**
**LSU**	**3**
New Orleans	0

Final
Cal State Fullerton	3	—
**LSU**	**7**	—

=== West I Regional at Stanford, CA ===
First round
1	**Stanford**	**12**
6	Minnesota	1
2	**Washington State**	**10**
5	Oral Roberts	5
3	**Wichita State**	**4**
4	UC Santa Barbara	3

Second round
**Stanford**	**12**
UC Santa Barbara	5
**Washington State**	**4**
Wichita State	3
Minnesota	0
**Oral Roberts**	**7**

Third round
**Stanford**	**12**
Washington State	11
Wichita State	4
**Oral Roberts**	**11**

Semifinals
Washington State	13
**Oral Roberts**	**14**^{12}

Final
**Stanford**	**9**	—
Oral Roberts	4	—

=== West II Regional at Tempe, AZ ===
First round
1	**Pepperdine**	**7**
6	Arizona	3
2	**UCLA**	**12**
5	Hawaii	11
3	**Arizona State**	**9**
4	SW Missouri State	5

Second round
**Pepperdine**	**10**
SW Missouri State	4
UCLA	3
**Arizona State**	**9**
**Hawaii**	**6**
Arizona	3

Third round
Pepperdine	2
**Arizona State**	**4**
**UCLA**	**16**
Hawaii	7

Semifinals
Pepperdine	5
**UCLA**	**21**

Final
**Arizona State**	**14**	—
UCLA	4	—

== College World Series ==
This was the last CWS to use a double-elimination format through the championship game. Under the format used from 1950 through 1987, the bracket was often adjusted after the field was pared to four teams in order to avoid rematches from earlier rounds. Starting in 1988 and continuing through 2002, the eight teams were divided into two four-team brackets, with the bracket winners meeting in a single championship game. In 2003, the single championship game was changed to a best-of-three series.

This CWS was best known for Stanford's dramatic 6-5 win over LSU in an elimination game. In that game, Stanford trailed 5-2 in the bottom of the 10th inning with 2 outs and nobody on base. Eventually, Freshman outfielder Paul Carey hit a walk off grand slam home run off LSU freshman (and future major leaguer) Ben McDonald to win the game.

=== Participants ===
School	Conference	Record (conference)	Head coach	CWS appearances	CWS best finish	CWS record
Arizona State	Pac-10	40–25 (16–14)	Jim Brock	13 (last: 1984)	1st (1965, 1967, 1969, 1977, 1981)	46–21
Arkansas	SWC	50–14–1 (17–4)	Norm DeBriyn	2 (last: 1985)	2nd (1979)	5–4
Florida State	Metro	54–16 (19–4)	Mike Martin	8 (last: 1986)	2nd (1970, 1986)	12–16
Georgia	SEC	42–19 (18–8)	Steve Webber	0 (last: none)	none	0–0
LSU	SEC	47–17 (12–10)	Skip Bertman	1 (last: 1986)	6th (1986)	1–2
Oklahoma State	Big 8	56–11 (15–6)	Gary Ward	14 (last: 1986)	1st (1959)	30–27
Stanford	Pac-10	48–16 (21–9)	Mark Marquess	5 (last: 1985)	3rd (1967)	7–10
Texas	SWC	58–9 (18–3)	Cliff Gustafson	23 (last: 1985)	1st (1949, 1950, 1975, 1983)	55–40

=== Results ===
==== Bracket ====
Upper round 1
**Oklahoma State**	**8**
Arizona State	3
**LSU**	**6**^{10}
Florida State	2
**Texas**	**13**
Arkansas	6
**Stanford**	**3**
Georgia	2

Upper round 2
**Oklahoma State**	**8**
LSU	7
Texas	1
**Stanford**	**6**
Lower round 1
Arizona State	0
**Florida State**	**3**
**Arkansas**	**5**
Georgia	4

Upper final
**Oklahoma State**	**6**
Stanford	2
Lower round 2
**Texas**	**6**^{10}
Florida State	4
**LSU**	**5**
Arkansas	2

Semifinals
Oklahoma State	5
**Texas**	**6**
**Stanford**	**6**^{10}
LSU	5

Preliminary final
Texas	3
**Stanford**	**9**

Final
Oklahoma State	5
**Stanford**	**9**

==== Game results ====
Date	Game	Winner	Score	Loser	Notes
May 29	Game 1	Oklahoma State	8–3	Arizona State	
May 29	Game 2	LSU	6–2 (10 innings)	Florida State	
May 30	Game 3	Texas	13–6	Arkansas	
May 30	Game 4	Stanford	3–2	Georgia	
May 31	Game 5	Florida State	3–0	Arizona State	Arizona State eliminated
May 31	Game 6	Arkansas	5–4	Georgia	Georgia eliminated
June 1/2	Game 7	Oklahoma State	8–7	LSU	
June 2	Game 8	Stanford	6–1	Texas	
June 3	Game 9	LSU	5–2	Arkansas	Arkansas eliminated
June 3	Game 10	Texas	6–4 (10 innings)	Florida State	Florida State eliminated
June 4	Game 11	Oklahoma State	6–2	Stanford	Oklahoma State qualified for final
June 5	Game 12	Stanford	6–5 (10 innings)	LSU	LSU eliminated
June 5	Game 13	Texas	6–5	Oklahoma State	
June 6	Game 14	Stanford	9–3	Texas	Texas eliminated
June 7	Final	Stanford	9–5	Oklahoma State	Stanford wins CWS

- The Oklahoma State-LSU game was suspended overnight due to severe thunderstorms.

=== All-Tournament Team ===
The following players were members of the All-Tournament Team.

Position	Player	School
P	Pat Hope	Oklahoma State
P	Gregg Patterson	LSU
C	Adam Smith	Oklahoma State
1B	Jimmy Barragan	Oklahoma State
2B	Brad Beanblossom	Oklahoma State
3B	Scott Coolbaugh	Texas
SS	David Esquer	Stanford
OF	**Paul Carey (MOP)**	Stanford
OF	Brian Cisarik	Texas
OF	Jack Voigt	LSU
DH	Mark Machtolf	Stanford

=== Notable players ===
- Arizona State: Mike Benjamin, Blas Minor, Mike Schwabe, Tim Spehr
- Arkansas: Jimmy Kremers, Mike Oquist, Tim Sherrill
- Florida State: Rafael Bournigal, Matt Dunbar, Richie Lewis, Jerry Nielsen, Deion Sanders
- Georgia: Cris Carpenter, Steve Carter, Derek Lilliquist
- LSU: Albert Belle, Mark Guthrie, Barry Manuel, Ben McDonald, Russ Springer, Jack Voigt
- Oklahoma State: Monty Fariss, Tim Pugh, Robin Ventura
- Stanford: Ruben Amaro, Paul Carey, Steve Chitren, Toi Cook, David Esquer, Brian Johnson, Brian Keyser, Mark Machtolf, Jack McDowell, Al Osuna, Ed Sprague, Ron Witmeyer
- Texas: Scott Coolbaugh, Todd Haney, Mark Petkovsek

== See also ==
- 1987 NCAA Division I softball tournament
- 1987 NCAA Division II baseball tournament
- 1987 NCAA Division III baseball tournament
- 1987 NAIA World Series
