= 1988 College Baseball All-America Team =

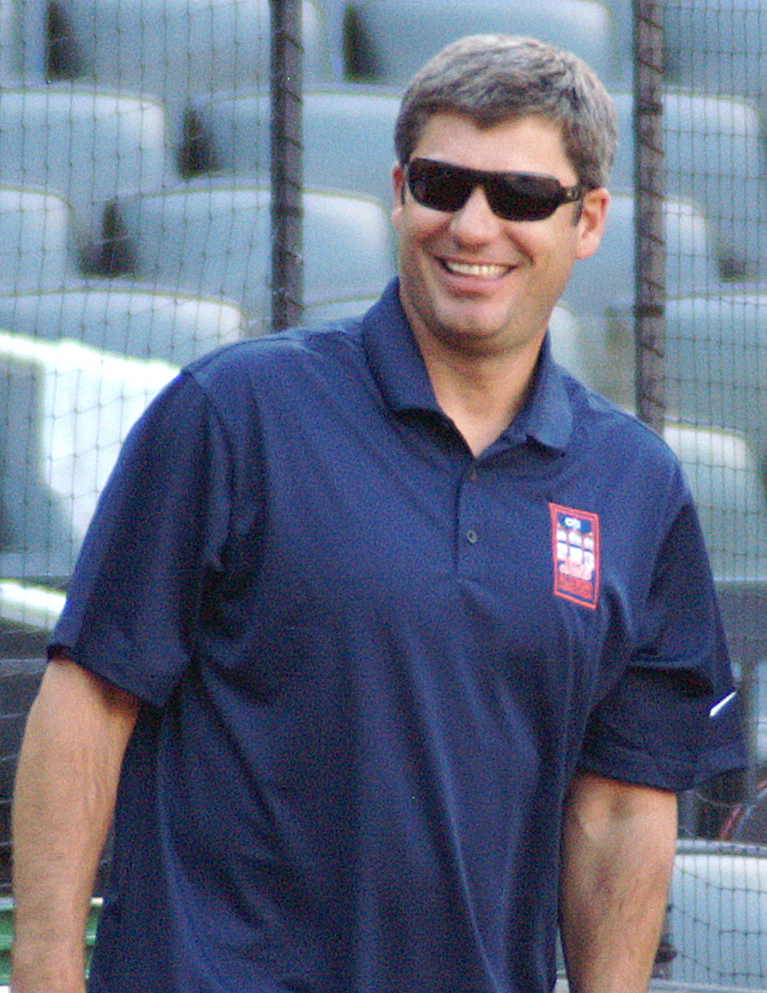
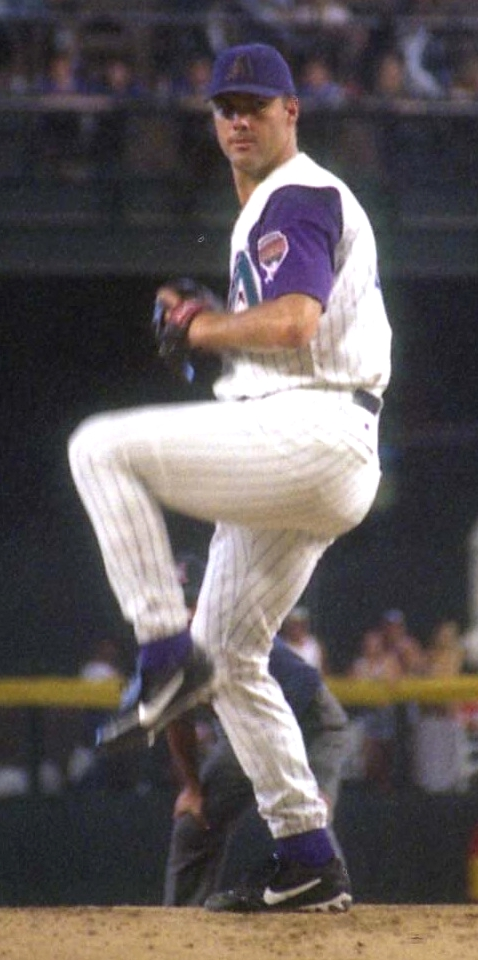
1988 All-Americans included National College Baseball Hall of Fame inductee Robin Ventura (left) and two-time MLB All-Star Andy Benes (right).

This is a list of college baseball players named first team All-Americans for the 1988 NCAA Division I baseball season. From 1981 to 1990, there were three generally recognized All-America selectors for baseball: the American Baseball Coaches Association, Baseball America, and The Sporting News. In order to be considered a "consensus" All-American, a player must have been selected by at least two of these.

== Key ==
A	American Baseball Coaches Association
B	Baseball America
S	The Sporting News
	Member of the National College Baseball Hall of Fame
	Consensus All-American – selected by all three organizations
	Consensus All-American – selected by two organizations

== All-Americans ==
Position	Name	School	#	A	B	S	Other awards and honors
Pitcher	Jim Abbott	Michigan	1	—	—	✓	
Pitcher	Andy Benes	Evansville	2	✓	✓	—	Rotary Smith Award Baseball America Pitcher of the Year Collegiate Baseball Player of the Year First overall pick in the 1988 MLB draft
Pitcher	Kirk Dressendorfer	Texas	1	—	✓	—	Baseball America Freshman of the Year
Pitcher	Ben McDonald	LSU	1	—	✓	—	
Pitcher	Gregg Olson	Auburn	3	✓	✓	✓	
Pitcher	John Salles	Fresno State	1	✓	—	—	
Catcher	Jim Campanis, Jr.	USC	1	—	✓	—	
Catcher	Bert Hefferman	Clemson	1	✓	—	—	
Catcher	Brian Johnson	Texas	1	—	—	✓	
First baseman	Tino Martinez	Tampa	1	—	—	✓	
First baseman	Lance Shebelut	Fresno State	2	✓	✓	—	
Second baseman	Ty Griffin	Georgia Tech	1	—	—	✓	
Second baseman	Kevin Higgins	Arizona State	1	—	✓	—	
Second baseman	Mark Standiford	Wichita State	1	✓	—	—	
Shortstop	Monty Fariss	Oklahoma State	2	—	✓	✓	
Shortstop	Dave Silvestri	Missouri	1	✓	—	—	
Third baseman	Robin Ventura	Oklahoma State	3	✓	✓	✓	Dick Howser Trophy Golden Spikes Award ABCA Player of the Year The Sporting News Player of the Year
Outfielder	Chris Estep	Kentucky	1	—	—	✓	
Outfielder	Mike Fiore	Miami (FL)	2	✓	✓	—	
Outfielder	Tom Goodwin	Fresno State	2	✓	✓	—	
Outfielder	Billy Masse	Wake Forest	3	✓	✓	✓	
Outfielder	Ted Wood	New Orleans	1	—	—	✓	
Designated hitter	Scott Livingstone	Texas A&M	1	—	—	✓	
Designated hitter	Mike Willes	BYU	1	✓	—	—	
Utility player	John Olerud	Washington State	2	✓	✓	—	Baseball America Player of the Year

== See also ==
- List of college baseball awards
