= 1988 Stanford Cardinal baseball team =

American college baseball season

1988 Stanford Cardinal baseball

National champions Pac-10 Southern Division champions
- Conference: Pacific-10 Conference
- CB: No. 1
- Record: 46-23 (18–12 Pac-10)
- Head coach: Mark Marquess (12th year)
- Home stadium: Sunken Diamond

1988 Pacific-10 Conference baseball standings
	Conf.				Overall
Team	W		L	PCT	W		L	PCT
Northern
No. 16 Washington State ^{x}‍‍‍^{y}	18	–	4	.818	52	–	14	.788
Oregon State ‍‍‍	14	–	10	.583	30	–	19	.612
Portland State ‍‍‍	12	–	9	.571	33	–	25	.569
Gonzaga ‍‍‍	12	–	11	.522	28	–	28	.500
Portland ‍‍‍	11	–	13	.458	28	–	27	.509
Washington ‍‍‍	8	–	16	.333	17	–	28	.378
Eastern Washington ‍‍‍	6	–	18	.250	25	–	34	.424
Southern
No. 2 Arizona State ^{x}‍‍‍^{y}	21	–	9	.700	60	–	13	.822
No. 1 Stanford ‍‍‍^{y}	18	–	12	.600	46	–	23	.667
No. 8 California ‍‍‍^{y}	16	–	14	.533	40	–	25	.615
No. 13 Southern California ‍‍‍^{y}	13	–	17	.433	36	–	26	.581
UCLA ‍‍‍	12	–	18	.400	31	–	28	.525
Arizona ‍‍‍	10	–	20	.333	33	–	26	.559
x – Division champion y – Invited to the NCAA tournament As of June 30, 1988; Rankings from Collegiate Baseball

The 1988 Stanford Cardinal baseball team represented Stanford University in the 1988 NCAA Division I baseball season. The team was coached by Mark Marquess in his 12th season at Stanford.

The Cardinal won the College World Series, defeating the Arizona State Sun Devils in the championship game.

== Roster ==
1988 Stanford Cardinal roster
Pitchers: Steve Chitren; Rob Kamerschen; Brian Keyser; Mike Mussina; Lee Plemel; Jim Price; Stan Spencer	Infielders: Frank Carey; Troy Paulsen; Jeff Saenger; Ed Sprague Jr.; Ron Witmeyer	Outfielders: Rubén Amaro Jr.; Eric DeGraw; Mike Eicher; Tim Griffin; Jack Hollis; Brian Johnson; Catchers: Eric Cox; Doug Robbins

== Schedule ==
1988 Stanford Cardinal baseball game log
Regular season
January/February

Date	Opponent	Score	Overall record	Pac-10 record
January 31	at Santa Clara	2-3	0-1	–
February 1	Santa Clara	3-2	1-1	–
February 2	UC Davis	13-8	2-1	–
February 5	Cal State Fullerton	1-5	2-2	–
February 6	Cal State Fullerton	9-4	3-2	–
February 7	Cal State Fullerton	5-6	3-3	–
February 9	at Pacific	4-1	4-3	–
February 12	at Hawaii	5-0	5-3	–
February 13	at Hawaii	4-5	5-4	–
February 14	at Hawaii	3-4	5-5	–
February 16	Cal State Hayward	12-6	6-5	–
February 17	San Francisco	5-3	7-5	–
February 19	UC Santa Barbara	15-4	8-5	–
February 20	UC Santa Barbara	9-8	9-5	–
February 21	UC Santa Barbara	13-2	10-5	–
February 22	Cal State LA	4-1	11-5	–
February 26	at Southern California	13-4	12-5	1–0
February 27	at Southern California	7-6	13-5	2–0

March

Date	Opponent	Score	Overall record	Pac-10 record
March 1	San Jose State	10-9	14-5	–
March 4	UCLA	3-6	14-6	2–1
March 5	UCLA	11-4	15-6	3–1
March 6	UCLA	5-1	16-6	4–1
March 19	Arizona	5-0	17-6	5–1
March 20	Arizona	8-7	18-6	6–1
March 21	Arizona	5-4	19-6	7–1
March 22	at Fresno State	3-13	19-7	–
March 25	at Arizona State	1-9	19-8	7–2
March 26	at Arizona State	10-11	19-9	7–3
March 27	at Arizona State	7-10	19-10	7–4
March 29	at Santa Clara	4-2	20-10	–
March 31	California	3-2	21-10	8–4

April

Date	Opponent	Score	Overall record	Pac-10 record
April 1	at California	2-3	21-11	8–5
April 2	California	6-5	22-11	9–5
April 4	Saint Mary's	13-2	23-11	–
April 5	Santa Clara	20-3	24-11	–
April 8	at Arizona	5-20	24-12	9–6
April 9	at Arizona	10-7	25-12	10–6
April 10	at Arizona	8-9	25-13	10–7
April 12	at San Francisco	17-6	26-13	–
April 15	at UCLA	4-9	26-14	10–8
April 16	at UCLA	8-5	27-14	11–8
April 17	at UCLA	5-2	28-14	12–8
April 18	at USC	5-3	29-14	13–8
April 23	Arizona State	5-3	30-14	14–8
April 24	Arizona State	6-15	30-15	14–9
April 25	Arizona State	5-13	30-16	14–10
April 26	at San Jose State	7-3	31-16	–
April 27	at Fresno State	5-6	31-17	–
April 29	at Miami (FL)	3-9	31-18	–
April 30	at Miami (FL)	3-7	31-19	–

May

Date	Opponent	Score	Overall record	Pac-10 record
May 3	Pacific	16-0	32-19	-
May 6	at California	3-8	32-20	14-11
May 7	California	13-3	33-20	15-11
May 8	at California	1-4	33-21	15-12
May 10	at San Francisco State	23-2	34-21	–
May 13	USC	10-8	35-21	16-12
May 14	USC	10-9	36-21	17-12
May 15	USC	12-4	37-21	18-12

NCAA tournament: Northeast Regional

Date	Opponent	Score	Overall record
May 27	vs. St. John's	3-5	37-22
May 27	vs. Fordham	7-5	38-22
May 29	vs. Rutgers	8-1	39-22
May 30	vs. Kentucky	6-5	40-22
May 31	vs. Kentucky	16-2	41-22

NCAA tournament: College World Series

Date	Opponent	Site/stadium	Score	Overall record
June 4	vs. Fresno State	Rosenblatt Stadium	10-3	42-22
June 6	vs. Cal State Fullerton	Rosenblatt Stadium	3-5	42-23
June 7	vs. Miami (FL)	Rosenblatt Stadium	2-1	43-23
June 9	vs. Cal State Fullerton	Rosenblatt Stadium	4-1	44-23
June 10	vs. Cal State Fullerton	Rosenblatt Stadium	9-5	45-23
June 11	vs. Arizona State	Rosenblatt Stadium	9-4	46-23

== Awards and honors ==
Troy Paulsen

- First Team All-Pac-10

Lee Plemel

- College World Series Most Outstanding Player

Doug Robbins

- College World Series All-Tournament Team

Ed Sprague

- First Team All-American
- First Team All-Pac-10

Ron Witmeyer

- College World Series All-Tournament Team

== Cardinal in the 1988 MLB draft ==
The following members of the Stanford Cardinal baseball program were drafted in the 1988 Major League Baseball draft.

Player	Position	Round	Overall	MLB team
Ed Sprague	3B	1st	25th	Toronto Blue Jays
Lee Plemel	RHP	5th	132nd	St. Louis Cardinals
Ron Witmeyer	1B	7th	177th	Oakland Athletics
Steve Chitren	RHP	9th	227th	Seattle Mariners
Doug Robbins	C	10th	243rd	Baltimore Orioles
Jim Price	RHP	25th	653rd	Seattle Mariners
