= 1988 NCAA Division I baseball season =

Baseball season

- Number of teams: 270

NCAA tournament

College World Series
- Champions: Stanford (2nd title)
- Runners-up: Arizona State (15th CWS Appearance)
- Winning coach: George Wolfman (1st title)
- MOP: Lee Plemel (Stanford)

Seasons
- ← 1987 1989 →

The 1988 NCAA Division I baseball season, play of college baseball in the United States organized by the National Collegiate Athletic Association (NCAA) began in the spring of 1988. The season progressed through the regular season and concluded with the 1988 College World Series. The College World Series, held for the forty second time in 1988, consisted of one team from each of eight regional competitions and was held in Omaha, Nebraska, at Johnny Rosenblatt Stadium as a double-elimination tournament. Stanford claimed the championship for the second time.

== Realignment and format changes ==
- Armstrong State moved its athletic program back to NCAA Division II. The Big South Conference dissolved its two division format and played as a single conference of seven members.
- The Big Ten Conference dissolved its two division format, playing as a single conference of ten members.

== Conference winners ==
This is a partial list of conference champions from the 1988 season. The NCAA sponsored regional competitions to determine the College World Series participants. Each of the eight regionals consisted of six teams competing in double-elimination tournaments, with the winners advancing to Omaha. 27 teams earned automatic bids by winning their conference championship while 21 teams earned at-large selections.

Conference	Regular season winner	Conference tournament	Tournament venue • city	Tournament winner
Atlantic Coast Conference	Clemson	1988 Atlantic Coast Conference baseball tournament	Greenville Municipal Stadium • Greenville, SC	Georgia Tech
Atlantic 10 Conference	East - Rutgers; West Virginia	1988 Atlantic 10 Conference baseball tournament	Bear Stadium • Boyertown, PA	Rutgers
Big East Conference	North - Providence; South - Villanova	1988 Big East Conference baseball tournament	Muzzy Field • Bristol, CT	St. John's
Big Eight Conference	Oklahoma State	1988 Big Eight Conference baseball tournament	All Sports Stadium • Oklahoma City, OK	Oklahoma State
Big South Conference	Coastal Carolina	1988 Big South Conference baseball tournament	Taylor Field • Buies Creek, NC	Campbell
Big Ten Conference	Michigan	1988 Big Ten Conference baseball tournament	Ray Fisher Stadium • Ann Arbor, MI	Minnesota
Colonial Athletic Association	James Madison	1988 Colonial Athletic Association baseball tournament	The Diamond • Richmond, VA	George Mason
EIBL	Penn	No tournament		
Mid-American Conference	Central Michigan	No tournament		
Midwestern Collegiate Conference	North - Notre Dame; South - Evansville	1988 Midwestern Collegiate Conference baseball tournament	South Bend, IN	Evansville
Metro Conference	South Carolina	1988 Metro Conference baseball tournament	Seminole Stadium • Tallahassee, FL	Florida State
Mid-Continent Conference	Blue - Valparaiso; Gray - Southwest Missouri State	1988 Mid-Continent Conference baseball tournament	Chicago, IL	Southwest Missouri State
Pacific-10 Conference	North - Washington State; South - Arizona State	No tournament		
Pacific Coast Athletic Association	Fresno State	No tournament		
Southeastern Conference	Florida	1988 Southeastern Conference baseball tournament	Dudy Noble Field • Starkville, MS	Florida
Southern Conference	North - VMI; South - Western Carolina	1988 Southern Conference baseball tournament	Asheville, NC	Western Carolina
Southwest Conference	Texas	1988 Southwest Conference baseball tournament	George Cole Field • Fayetteville, AR	Texas
Trans America Athletic Conference	East - Georgia Southern; West - Centenary	1988 Trans America Athletic Conference baseball tournament	Centenary Park • Shreveport, LA	Stetson

== Conference standings ==
The following is an incomplete list of conference standings:

1988 Atlantic Coast Conference baseball standings
	Conf.				Overall
Team	W		L	PCT	W		L	PCT
No. 21 Clemson ‍†‍‍^{y}	18	–	2	.900	54	–	14	.794
No. 27 NC State ‍‍‍^{y}	13	–	6	.684	45	–	16	.738
No. 29 Georgia Tech ‍‍‡‍^{y}	12	–	8	.600	45	–	24	.652
Virginia ‍‍‍	11	–	10	.524	32	–	19	.627
North Carolina ‍‍‍	10	–	11	.476	34	–	27	.557
Wake Forest ‍‍‍	7	–	12	.368	32	–	26	.552
Maryland ‍‍‍	5	–	14	.263	20	–	24	.455
Duke ‍‍‍	3	–	16	.158	10	–	35	.222
† – Conference champion ‡ – Tournament champion y – Invited to the NCAA tournament As of June 30, 1988; Rankings from Collegiate Baseball

1988 Atlantic 10 Conference baseball standings
	Conf.						Overall
Team	W		L		T	PCT	W		L		T	PCT
East
Rutgers ^{x}‍‍‡‍^{y}	14	–	2	–	0	.875	38	–	21	–	1	.642
UMass ‍‍‍	9	–	7	–	0	.563	36	–	16	–	0	.692
Temple ‍‍‍	8	–	8	–	0	.500	27	–	27	–	0	.500
Rhode Island ‍‍‍	5	–	11	–	0	.313	10	–	28	–	0	.263
Saint Joseph's ‍‍‍	4	–	12	–	0	.250	16	–	23	–	1	.413
West
West Virginia ^{x}‍‍‍	12	–	4	–	0	.750	33	–	17	–	1	.657
George Washington ‍‍‍	11	–	5	–	0	.688	30	–	26	–	1	.535
Penn State ‍‍‍	8	–	8	–	0	.500	24	–	26	–	0	.480
St. Bonaventure ‍‍‍	7	–	9	–	0	.438	26	–	21	–	0	.553
Duquesne ‍‍‍	2	–	14	–	0	.125	13	–	16	–	0	.448
x – Division champion ‡ – Tournament champion y – Invited to the NCAA tournament As of June 30, 1988; Rankings from Collegiate Baseball

1988 Big East Conference baseball standings
	Conf.						Overall
Team	W		L		T	PCT	W		L		T	PCT
North Division
Providence ^{x}‍‍‍	12	–	6	–	0	.667	22	–	29	–	0	.431
St. John's ‍‍‡‍^{y}	9	–	9	–	0	.500	29	–	21	–	1	.578
Boston College ‍‍‍	8	–	10	–	0	.444	15	–	16	–	0	.484
Connecticut ‍‍‍	7	–	11	–	0	.389	24	–	18	–	0	.571
South Division
Villanova ^{x}‍‍‍	16	–	2	–	0	.889	32	–	22	–	0	.593
Seton Hall ‍‍‍	12	–	6	–	0	.667	39	–	16	–	0	.709
Georgetown ‍‍‍	4	–	13	–	0	.235	12	–	31	–	0	.279
Pittsburgh ‍‍‍	3	–	14	–	0	.176	9	–	20	–	0	.310
x – Division champion ‡ – Tournament champion y – Invited to the NCAA tournament As of June 30, 1988; Rankings from Collegiate Baseball

1988 Big South Conference baseball standings
	Conf.				Overall
Team	W		L	PCT	W		L	PCT
Coastal Carolina ‍†‍‍	15	–	0	1.000	35	–	12	.745
Baptist ‍‍‍	12	–	7	.632	27	–	16	.628
Campbell ‍‍‡‍	10	–	8	.556	32	–	16	.667
Winthrop ‍‍‍	8	–	8	.500	22	–	15	.595
Augusta State ‍‍‍	8	–	10	.444	16	–	27	.372
Radford ‍‍‍	4	–	10	.286	13	–	26	.333
UNC Asheville ‍‍‍	1	–	15	.063	9	–	32	.220
† – Conference champion ‡ – Tournament champion As of June 30, 1988; Rankings from Collegiate Baseball

1988 Big Ten Conference baseball standings
	Conf.				Overall
Team	W		L	PCT	W		L	PCT
No. 19 Michigan ‍†‍‍^{y}	20	–	8	.714	48	–	19	.716
Minnesota ‍‍‡‍^{y}	17	–	11	.607	38	–	28	.576
Michigan State ‍‍‍	16	–	12	.571	41	–	20	.672
Ohio State ‍‍‍	16	–	12	.571	32	–	28	.533
Wisconsin ‍‍‍	15	–	13	.536	28	–	27	.509
Iowa ‍‍‍	14	–	14	.500	29	–	25	.537
Illinois ‍‍‍	12	–	16	.429	26	–	20	.565
Indiana ‍‍‍	11	–	17	.393	39	–	29	.574
Northwestern ‍‍‍	11	–	17	.393	28	–	28	.500
Purdue ‍‍‍	8	–	20	.286	26	–	34	.433
x – Division champion ‡ – Tournament champion y – Invited to the NCAA tournament As of June 30, 1988; Rankings from Collegiate Baseball

1988 Colonial Athletic Association baseball standings
	Conf.						Overall
Team	W		L		T	PCT	W		L		T	PCT
James Madison ‍†‍‍^{y}	13	–	1	–	0	.929	43	–	11	–	2	.786
George Mason ‍‍‡‍^{y}	8	–	6	–	0	.571	34	–	27	–	1	.556
East Carolina ‍‍‍	8	–	6	–	0	.571	33	–	14	–	0	.702
William & Mary ‍‍‍	5	–	9	–	0	.357	17	–	28	–	0	.378
UNC Wilmington ‍‍‍	4	–	10	–	0	.286	11	–	42	–	0	.208
Richmond ‍‍‍	4	–	10	–	0	.286	26	–	33	–	0	.441
† – Conference champion ‡ – Tournament champion y – Invited to the NCAA tournament As of June 30, 1988; Rankings from Collegiate Baseball

1988 NCAA Division I baseball independents standings
	Conf.						Overall
Team	W		L		T	PCT	W		L		T	PCT
No. 5 Miami (FL) ‍‍‍^{y}	0	–	0	–	0	–	52	–	14	–	1	.784
Delaware State ‍‍‍	0	–	0	–	0	–	25	–	11	–	0	.694
New Mexico State ‍‍‍	0	–	0	–	0	–	38	–	18	–	0	.679
FIU ‍‍‍	0	–	0	–	0	–	40	–	19	–	0	.678
UCF ‍‍‍	0	–	0	–	0	–	40	–	20	–	0	.667
Florida A&M ‍‍‍	0	–	0	–	0	–	26	–	13	–	0	.667
No. 28 Tulane ‍‍‍^{y}	0	–	0	–	0	–	32	–	18	–	0	.640
Southwestern Louisiana ‍‍‍^{y}	0	–	0	–	0	–	30	–	18	–	0	.625
UMBC ‍‍‍	0	–	0	–	0	–	25	–	16	–	0	.610
Nicholls State ‍‍‍	0	–	0	–	0	–	28	–	21	–	0	.571
Akron ‍‍‍	0	–	0	–	0	–	28	–	31	–	0	.475
United States International ‍‍‍	0	–	0	–	0	–	18	–	26	–	0	.409
Northern Colorado ‍‍‍	0	–	0	–	0	–	19	–	28	–	0	.404
Chicago State ‍‍‍	0	–	0	–	0	–	18	–	29	–	0	.383
Liberty ‍‍‍	0	–	0	–	0	–	18	–	32	–	0	.360
Boston University ‍‍‍	0	–	0	–	0	–	7	–	17	–	0	.292
Bethune–Cookman ‍‍‍	0	–	0	–	0	–	9	–	23	–	0	.281
Maryland Eastern Shore ‍‍‍	0	–	0	–	0	–	7	–	24	–	0	.226
y – Invited to the NCAA tournament As of June 30, 1988; Rankings from Collegiate Baseball

1988 Midwestern Collegiate Conference baseball standings
	Conf.				Overall
Team	W		L	PCT	W		L	PCT
North Division
Notre Dame ^{x}‍‍‍	9	–	3	.750	39	–	22	.639
Detroit ‍‍‍	8	–	8	.500	31	–	24	.564
Xavier ‍‍‍	5	–	7	.417	19	–	37	.339
Dayton ‍‍‍	2	–	10	.167	20	–	29	.408
South Division
Evansville ^{x}‍†‍‡‍^{y}	11	–	1	.917	44	–	20	.688
Butler ‍‍‍	3	–	5	.375	15	–	26	.366
Saint Louis ‍‍‍	2	–	6	.250	11	–	29	.275
x – Division champion † – Conference champion ‡ – Tournament champion y – Invited to the NCAA Tournament; As of June 30, 1988; Rankings from Collegiate Baseball

1988 Missouri Valley Conference baseball standings
	Conf.						Overall
Team	W		L		T	PCT	W		L		T	PCT
No. 4 Wichita State ‍‍‡‍^{y}	16	–	4	–	0	.800	56	–	16	–	1	.774
Creighton ‍‍‍	12	–	8	–	0	.600	43	–	21	–	1	.669
Southern Illinois ‍‍‍	11	–	9	–	0	.550	40	–	22	–	0	.645
Bradley ‍‍‍	8	–	12	–	0	.400	34	–	25	–	0	.576
Illinois State ‍‍‍	7	–	13	–	0	.350	21	–	25	–	2	.458
Indiana State ‍‍‍	6	–	14	–	0	.300	31	–	28	–	0	.525
‡ – Tournament champion y – Invited to the NCAA tournament As of June 30, 1988; Rankings from Collegiate Baseball

1988 Pacific-10 Conference baseball standings
	Conf.				Overall
Team	W		L	PCT	W		L	PCT
Northern
No. 16 Washington State ^{x}‍‍‍^{y}	18	–	4	.818	52	–	14	.788
Oregon State ‍‍‍	14	–	10	.583	30	–	19	.612
Portland State ‍‍‍	12	–	9	.571	33	–	25	.569
Gonzaga ‍‍‍	12	–	11	.522	28	–	28	.500
Portland ‍‍‍	11	–	13	.458	28	–	27	.509
Washington ‍‍‍	8	–	16	.333	17	–	28	.378
Eastern Washington ‍‍‍	6	–	18	.250	25	–	34	.424
Southern
No. 2 Arizona State ^{x}‍‍‍^{y}	21	–	9	.700	60	–	13	.822
No. 1 Stanford ‍‍‍^{y}	18	–	12	.600	46	–	23	.667
No. 8 California ‍‍‍^{y}	16	–	14	.533	40	–	25	.615
No. 13 Southern California ‍‍‍^{y}	13	–	17	.433	36	–	26	.581
UCLA ‍‍‍	12	–	18	.400	31	–	28	.525
Arizona ‍‍‍	10	–	20	.333	33	–	26	.559
x – Division champion y – Invited to the NCAA tournament As of June 30, 1988; Rankings from Collegiate Baseball

1988 Pacific Coast Athletic Association baseball standings
	Conf.						Overall
Team	W		L		T	PCT	W		L		T	PCT
No. 7 Fresno State ‍†‍‍^{y}	20	–	1	–	0	.952	56	–	12	–	0	.824
No. 25 UNLV ‍‍‍^{y}	14	–	7	–	0	.667	40	–	22	–	0	.645
No. 3 Cal State Fullerton ‍‍‍^{y}	12	–	8	–	0	.600	43	–	18	–	0	.705
San Jose State ‍‍‍	9	–	11	–	0	.450	31	–	30	–	0	.508
UC Irvine ‍‍‍	9	–	12	–	0	.429	30	–	28	–	1	.517
Pacific ‍‍‍	9	–	12	–	0	.429	19	–	32	–	0	.373
UC Santa Barbara ‍‍‍	6	–	15	–	0	.286	23	–	39	–	0	.371
Long Beach State ‍‍‍	4	–	17	–	0	.190	14	–	45	–	0	.237
y – Invited to the NCAA tournament As of June 30, 1988; Rankings from Collegiate Baseball

1988 Southeastern Conference baseball standings
	Conf.				Overall
Team	W		L	PCT	W		L	PCT
No. 6 Florida ‍†‍‡‍^{y}	21	–	6	.778	48	–	19	.716
No. 14 Kentucky ‍‍‍^{y}	18	–	9	.667	38	–	25	.603
No. 23 Mississippi State ‍‍‍^{y}	17	–	10	.630	44	–	20	.688
Auburn ‍‍‍	16	–	10	.615	39	–	16	.709
LSU ‍‍‍	16	–	11	.593	39	–	21	.650
Georgia ‍‍‍	11	–	16	.407	29	–	28	.509
Vanderbilt ‍‍‍	11	–	16	.407	30	–	23	.566
Alabama ‍‍‍	9	–	17	.346	27	–	26	.509
Tennessee ‍‍‍	9	–	18	.333	21	–	29	.420
Ole Miss ‍‍‍	6	–	21	.222	24	–	29	.453
† – Conference champion ‡ – Tournament champion y – Invited to the NCAA tournament As of June 30, 1988; Rankings from Collegiate Baseball

1988 Southern Conference baseball standings
	Conf.				Overall
Team	W		L	PCT	W		L	PCT
Northern
VMI ^{x}‍‍‍	11	–	7	.611	20	–	20	.500
Appalachian State ‍‍‍	9	–	7	.563	29	–	17	.630
Marshall ‍‍‍	7	–	9	.438	23	–	17	.575
East Tennessee State ‍‍‍	7	–	11	.389	16	–	35	.314
Southern
Western Carolina ^{x}‍‍‡‍^{y}	14	–	3	.824	38	–	24	.613
The Citadel ‍‍‍	12	–	6	.667	33	–	20	.623
Davidson ‍‍‍	7	–	11	.389	28	–	26	.519
Furman ‍‍‍	2	–	15	.118	8	–	29	.216
x – Division champion ‡ – SoCon Tournament champion y – Invited to the NCAA tournament As of June 30, 1988; Rankings from Collegiate Baseball

1988 Trans America Athletic Conference baseball standings
	Conf.				Overall
Team	W		L	PCT	W		L	PCT
East
Georgia Southern ^{x}‍†‍‍	13	–	4	.765	30	–	27	.526
No. 20 Stetson ‍‍‡‍^{y}	9	–	8	.529	35	–	25	.583
Mercer ‍‍‍	7	–	10	.412	24	–	25	.490
Samford ‍‍‍	5	–	12	.294	8	–	49	.140
West
Centenary ^{x}‍‍‍	11	–	5	.688	30	–	20	.600
Arkansas–Little Rock ‍‍‍	8	–	8	.500	27	–	29	.482
Hardin–Simmons ‍‍‍	5	–	11	.313	30	–	30	.500
x – Division champion † – Conference champion ‡ – Tournament champion y – Invited to the NCAA tournament As of June 30, 1988; Rankings from Collegiate Baseball

== College World Series ==
The 1988 season marked the forty second NCAA baseball tournament, which culminated with the eight team College World Series. The College World Series was held in Omaha, Nebraska. The eight teams played a double-elimination format, with Stanford claiming their second championship with a 9–4 win over Arizona State in the final.

First round
1	Arizona State	4
8	California	2
4	Wichita State	5
5	Florida	4
8	California	5
5	Florida	6
7	Stanford	10
2	Fresno State	3
6	Cal State Fullerton	9
3	Miami (FL)	3
2	Fresno State	4
3	Miami (FL)	8^{12}

Second round
1	Arizona State	4
4	Wichita State	7
1	Arizona State	10
5	Florida	1
7	Stanford	3
6	Cal State Fullerton	5
7	Stanford	2
3	Miami (FL)	1

Semifinals
4	Wichita State	3	1
1	Arizona State	4^{10}	19
6	Cal State Fullerton	1	5
7	Stanford	3	9

Finals
1	Arizona State	4
7	Stanford	9
