= 1988 Colonial Athletic Association baseball tournament =

American college baseball tournament

- Teams: 6
- Format: Double-elimination tournament
- Finals site: The Diamond; Richmond, Virginia
- Champions: George Mason (1st title)
- Winning coach: Bill Brown (1st title)
- MVP: John Styles (George Mason)

1988 Colonial Athletic Association baseball standings
	Conf.						Overall
Team	W		L		T	PCT	W		L		T	PCT
James Madison ‍†‍‍^{y}	13	–	1	–	0	.929	43	–	11	–	2	.786
George Mason ‍‍‡‍^{y}	8	–	6	–	0	.571	34	–	27	–	1	.556
East Carolina ‍‍‍	8	–	6	–	0	.571	33	–	14	–	0	.702
William & Mary ‍‍‍	5	–	9	–	0	.357	17	–	28	–	0	.378
UNC Wilmington ‍‍‍	4	–	10	–	0	.286	11	–	42	–	0	.208
Richmond ‍‍‍	4	–	10	–	0	.286	26	–	33	–	0	.441
† – Conference champion ‡ – Tournament champion y – Invited to the NCAA tournament As of June 30, 1988; Rankings from Collegiate Baseball

The 1988 Colonial Athletic Association baseball tournament was held at The Diamond, home field of Richmond in Richmond, Virginia, from May 12 through 15. The event determined the champion of the Colonial Athletic Association for the 1988 season. The winner of the tournament, second-seeded George Mason, earned the CAA's automatic bid to the 1988 NCAA Division I baseball tournament.

== Format and seeding ==
The CAA's six teams were seeded one to six based on winning percentage from the conference's round robin regular season. They played a double-elimination tournament with first round matchups of the top and bottom seeds, second and fifth seeds, and third and fourth seeds.

Team	W	L	Pct.	GB	Seed
James Madison	13	1	.929	—	1
George Mason	8	6	.571	5	2
East Carolina	8	6	.571	5	3
William & Mary	5	9	.357	8	4
UNC Wilmington	4	10	.286	9	5
Richmond	4	10	.286	9	6

== Bracket and results ==
First round
1	James Madison	4
6	Richmond	3
3	East Carolina	9
4	William & Mary	1
2	George Mason	5
5	UNC Wilmington	1

Second round
1	James Madison	12
5	UNC Wilmington	4
3	East Carolina	2
2	George Mason	10
6	Richmond	7
4	William & Mary	4

Third round
1	James Madison	0
2	George Mason	2
3	East Carolina	2
6	Richmond	15

Semifinals
1	James Madison	3
6	Richmond	6

Final
2	George Mason	6	4
6	Richmond	7	2

== Most Valuable Player ==
John Styles was named Tournament Most Valuable Player. Styles was a pitcher for George Mason.
