= 1988 Big East Conference baseball tournament =

American college baseball tournament

- Teams: 4
- Format: Double-elimination
- Finals site: Muzzy Field; Bristol, CT
- Champions: St. John's (3rd title)
- Winning coach: Joe Russo (3rd title)
- MVP: Mike Weinberg (St. John's)

1988 Big East Conference baseball standings
	Conf.						Overall
Team	W		L		T	PCT	W		L		T	PCT
North Division
Providence ^{x}‍‍‍	12	–	6	–	0	.667	22	–	29	–	0	.431
St. John's ‍‍‡‍^{y}	9	–	9	–	0	.500	29	–	21	–	1	.578
Boston College ‍‍‍	8	–	10	–	0	.444	15	–	16	–	0	.484
Connecticut ‍‍‍	7	–	11	–	0	.389	24	–	18	–	0	.571
South Division
Villanova ^{x}‍‍‍	16	–	2	–	0	.889	32	–	22	–	0	.593
Seton Hall ‍‍‍	12	–	6	–	0	.667	39	–	16	–	0	.709
Georgetown ‍‍‍	4	–	13	–	0	.235	12	–	31	–	0	.279
Pittsburgh ‍‍‍	3	–	14	–	0	.176	9	–	20	–	0	.310
x – Division champion ‡ – Tournament champion y – Invited to the NCAA tournament As of June 30, 1988; Rankings from Collegiate Baseball

The 1988 Big East baseball tournament was held at Muzzy Field in Bristol, Connecticut. This was the fourth Big East baseball tournament, and was won by the St. John's Redmen. As a result, St. John's earned the Big East Conference's automatic bid to the 1988 NCAA Division I baseball tournament. This was the Redmen's third tournament championship in the first four.

== Format and seeding ==
The 1988 Big East baseball tournament was a 4 team double elimination tournament. The top two teams from each division, based on conference winning percentage only, earned berths in the tournament. Each division winner played the opposite division's runner up in the first round.

Team	W	L	Pct.	GB	Seed
North Division
Providence	12	6	.667	–	1N
St. John's	9	9	.500	3	2N
Boston College	8	10	.444	4	–
Connecticut	7	11	.389	5	–
South Division
Villanova	16	2	.889	–	1S
Seton Hall	12	6	.667	4	2S
Georgetown	4	13	.235	11.5	–
Pittsburgh	3	14	.176	12.5	–

== Tournament ==
First round
1N	Providence	2
2S	Seton Hall	10
1S	Villanova	7
2N	St. John's	1
Lower round 1
1N	Providence	6
2N	St. John's	14

Semi-finals
2S	Seton Hall	2
1S	Villanova	8
Lower final
2S	Seton Hall	2
2N	St. John's	6

Finals
1S	Villanova	6	0
2N	St. John's	8	5

== All-Tournament Team ==
The following players were named to the All-Tournament team.

Position	Player	School
1B	Rick Petrone	Villanova
2B	Wally Heckell	St. John's
3B	Gary Scott	Villanova
SS	Kerry Cahill	St. John's
C	Brian McNamee	St. John's
OF	Robert Lambraia	St. John's
OF	Dana Brown	Seton Hall
OF	Mike Weinberg	St. John's
DH	Tom Dobson	St. John's
P	Tom Singer	St. John's

== Jack Kaiser Award ==
Mike Weinberg was the winner of the 1988 Jack Kaiser Award. Weinberg was an outfielder for St. John's.
