= Larry Cochell =

American baseball coach

Biographical details
- Born: 1939 or 1940 (age 86–87)

Coaching career (HC unless noted)
- 1967–1969: Emporia State
- 1970–1971: Creighton
- 1972–1976: Cal State Los Angeles
- 1977–1986: Oral Roberts
- 1987: Northwestern
- 1988–1990: Cal State Fullerton
- 1991–2005: Oklahoma

Head coaching record
- Overall: 1,331–813–3 (.621)

Accomplishments and honors

Championships
- 1× College World Series (1994); 2× PCAA (1973, 1974); 5× Midwestern City Conference/Midwestern Collegiate Conference (1981–1983, 1985, 1986); 1× Big West Conference (1990); 2× Big Eight Conference (1992, 1995); 1× Big 12 Conference Tournament (1997); Big West Conference Baseball Coach of the Year (1990)

Larry Cochell is an American former professional coach in NCAA Division I college baseball. He coached baseball for the Emporia State Hornets (then known as Kansas State Teachers College), the Creighton Bluejays, the Cal State Los Angeles Golden Eagles, the Oral Roberts Golden Eagles, the Northwestern Wildcats, the Cal State Fullerton Titans, and the Oklahoma Sooners.

== Career ==
He took three programs to the College World Series, doing so with Oral Roberts in 1978, Cal State Fullerton 1988 & 1990, and Oklahoma in 1992, 1994 & 1995, being the first coach to do so (with Ron Polk and Andy Lopez doing the feat in later years). He went 8–10 in six appearances. It was with Oklahoma that he received his highest success, leading them to a national championship at the 1994 College World Series in his fifteen seasons with the club. During his time at Oklahoma, he had his two of his sons play on the team, Chad (1997–2000) and Craig (1992–1993), with the former playing 126 total games and hitting .255 for his career. He is one of 56 coaches with over 1,100 wins, having a record of 1,331–813–3, 21st most.

== Controversy and aftermath ==
On April 29, 2005, reports surfaced that he used racial remarks to describe one of his players, notably saying in an interview before an ESPN2 telecast of the Oklahoma-Wichita State game that “There are honkies and white people and there are niggers and black people. Dunigan is a good black kid ... There’s no nigger in him.”, which he used to describe Oklahoma's freshman outfielder Joe Dunigan III. On May 1, 2005, he resigned, with Sunny Golloway serving as interim head coach for the rest of the season. After the resignation, he was offered positions in minor league baseball and work in Europe, but he turned them down, citing how he wanted to spend time with his family and deal with his health, particularly blockage in two of his arteries that were found around the time of his stepping down.

== Head coaching record ==
Record table
Season	Team	Overall	Conference	Standing	Postseason
Kansas State Teachers College (Rocky Mountain Athletic Conference) (1967–1969)
1967	Emporia State	16–17			
1968	Emporia State	25–14			
1969	Emporia State	29–13			NAIA World Series
Emporia State:		72–44 (.621)			
Creighton Bluejays (Independent) (1970–1971)
1970	Creighton	25–7			
1971	Creighton	24–21			
Creighton:		49–28 (.636)			
Cal State Los Angeles Golden Eagles (Pacific Coast Athletic Association) (1972–1974)
1972	Cal State Los Angeles	23–27	12–6		
1973	Cal State Los Angeles	31–20	13–5	1st	
1974	Cal State Los Angeles	35–18	18–5	1st	
Cal State Los Angeles Golden Eagles (Independent) (1975)
1975	Cal State Los Angeles	12–30			
Cal State Los Angeles Golden Eagles (West Coast Athletic Conference) (1976)
1976	Cal State Los Angeles	16–33	4–14	7th	
Cal State Los Angeles:		117–128 (.478)			
Oral Roberts Titans (Independent) (1977–1980)
1977	Oral Roberts	35–17			
1978	Oral Roberts	45–12			College World Series
1979	Oral Roberts	34–24			
1980	Oral Roberts	38–16			Midwest Regional
Oral Roberts Titans (Midwestern City Conference/Midwestern Collegiate Conference) (1981–1986)
1981	Oral Roberts	45–10–1	6–0	1st (South)	Midwest Regional
1982	Oral Roberts	49–13	7–1	1st (South)	Midwest Regional
1983	Oral Roberts	51–17	9–1	1st (South)	Midwest Regional
1984	Oral Roberts	38–23–1	7–5	2nd (South)	
1985	Oral Roberts	50–19	10–2	1st (South)	Midwest Regional
1986	Oral Roberts	43–20	6–0	1st (South)	Mideast Regional
Oral Roberts:		428–172–1 (.713)			
Northwestern Wildcats (Big Ten Conference) (1987)
1987	Northwestern	23–20–1	5–11	T–4th (West)	
Northwestern:		23–20–1 (.534)			
Cal State Fullerton Titans (Pacific Coast Athletic Association / Big West Conference) (1988–1990)
1988	Cal State Fullerton	43–18	12–3	3rd	College World Series
1989	Cal State Fullerton	30–27	10–11	5th	
1990	Cal State Fullerton	36–23	13–5	1st	College World Series
Cal State Fullerton:		109–68 (.616)	35–19 (.648)		
Oklahoma Sooners (Big Eight Conference) (1991–1996)
1991	Oklahoma	40–23	13–11	2nd	South Regional
1992	Oklahoma	43–24	17–7	T–1st	College World Series
1993	Oklahoma	31–24	13–14	5th	
1994	Oklahoma	50–17	21–9	2nd	College World Series champions
1995	Oklahoma	42–16	21–7	1st	College World Series
1996	Oklahoma	32–25	14–12	3rd	
Oklahoma Sooners (Big 12 Conference) (1997–2005)
1997	Oklahoma	39–20	18–11	4th	South I Regional
1998	Oklahoma	42–20	17–11	4th	Atlantic II Regional
1999	Oklahoma	30–29	12–18	8th	
2000	Oklahoma	41–23	20–10	3rd	Baton Rouge Super Regional
2001	Oklahoma	25–33–1	13–16–1	7th	
2002	Oklahoma	35–27	15–12	4th	Clemson Super Regional
2003	Oklahoma	23–31	10–17	7th	
2004	Oklahoma	38–24	19–8	2nd	Coral Gables Super Regional
2005	Oklahoma	23–20*	7–11*	5th	(Note: On May 1, Cochell resigned from the program due to racially insensitive remarks, one month before the 2005 NCAA Division I baseball tournament. The team finished with an overall record of 35–26 (14–13 in the Big 12). Sunny Golloway led the team to the Tournament, where they lost in the Oxford Super Regional.)
Oklahoma:		511–336–1 (.603)	223–163–1 (.578)		
Total:		1331–813–3 (.621)			
National champion Postseason invitational champion Conference regular season champion Conference regular season and conference tournament champion Division regular season champion Division regular season and conference tournament champion Conference tournament champion

== See also ==
- List of college baseball career coaching wins leaders
