= 1988 Big South Conference baseball tournament =

- Teams: 4
- Format: Double-elimination
- Finals site: Taylor Field; Buies Creek, North Carolina
- Champions: Campbell (1st title)
- Winning coach: Mike Caldwell (1st title)
- MVP: Rob Palentchar (Campbell)

1988 Big South Conference baseball standings
	Conf.				Overall
Team	W		L	PCT	W		L	PCT
Coastal Carolina ‍†‍‍	15	–	0	1.000	35	–	12	.745
Baptist ‍‍‍	12	–	7	.632	27	–	16	.628
Campbell ‍‍‡‍	10	–	8	.556	32	–	16	.667
Winthrop ‍‍‍	8	–	8	.500	22	–	15	.595
Augusta State ‍‍‍	8	–	10	.444	16	–	27	.372
Radford ‍‍‍	4	–	10	.286	13	–	26	.333
UNC Asheville ‍‍‍	1	–	15	.063	9	–	32	.220
† – Conference champion ‡ – Tournament champion As of June 30, 1988; Rankings from Collegiate Baseball

The 1988 Big South Conference baseball tournament was the postseason baseball tournament for the Big South Conference, held from April 21 through 23 at Taylor Field on the campus of Campbell University in Buies Creek, North Carolina. Four teams participated in the double-elimination tournament. The Big South played the season at the NCAA Division I level, but did not receive an automatic bid to the 1988 NCAA Division I baseball tournament. Campbell won the championship for the first time.

== Format ==
The top four finishers from the regular season qualified for the tournament.

Team	W	L	Pct.	GB	Seed
Coastal Carolina	15	0	1.000	—	1
Baptist	12	7	.632	5	2
Campbell	10	8	.556	6.5	3
Winthrop	8	8	.500	7.5	4
Augusta State	8	10	.444	8.5	—
Radford	4	10	.286	10.5	—
UNC Asheville	1	15	.063	15.5	—

== Bracket and results ==
First round
1	Coastal Carolina	10
4	Winthrop	4
3	Campbell	8^{12}
2	Baptist	6
Lower round 1
4	Winthrop	5
2	Baptist	6

Semi-finals
1	Coastal Carolina	5
3	Campbell	6^{10}
Lower final
1	Coastal Carolina	2
2	Baptist	8

Finals
3	Campbell	17	—
2	Baptist	0	—

== All-Tournament Team ==
Name	School
Ricky Berrier	Campbell
Hardy Ferguson	Charleston Southern
Kevin Futrell	Charleston Southern
Randy Hood	Campbell
Robbie Jordan	Coastal Carolina
Danny Murphy	Campbell
Bob Palentchar	Campbell
Cory Satterfield	Campbell
Randy Stokes	Coastal Carolina
Greg Streett	Coastal Carolina
Robert Tucker	Winthrop
Dan Wolfe	Charleston Southern

=== Most Valuable Player ===
Rob Palentchar was named Tournament Most Valuable Player. Palentchar was a designated hitter for Campbell.
