= 1988 Southeastern Conference baseball tournament =

- Teams: 6
- Format: Six-team double elimination tournament
- Finals site: Dudy Noble Field; Starkville, Mississippi
- Champions: Florida (4th title)
- Winning coach: Joe Arnold (2nd title)
- MVP: Brian Reimsnyder (Florida)
- Attendance: 43,068

1988 Southeastern Conference baseball standings
	Conf.				Overall
Team	W		L	PCT	W		L	PCT
No. 6 Florida ‍†‍‡‍^{y}	21	–	6	.778	48	–	19	.716
No. 14 Kentucky ‍‍‍^{y}	18	–	9	.667	38	–	25	.603
No. 23 Mississippi State ‍‍‍^{y}	17	–	10	.630	44	–	20	.688
Auburn ‍‍‍	16	–	10	.615	39	–	16	.709
LSU ‍‍‍	16	–	11	.593	39	–	21	.650
Georgia ‍‍‍	11	–	16	.407	29	–	28	.509
Vanderbilt ‍‍‍	11	–	16	.407	30	–	23	.566
Alabama ‍‍‍	9	–	17	.346	27	–	26	.509
Tennessee ‍‍‍	9	–	18	.333	21	–	29	.420
Ole Miss ‍‍‍	6	–	21	.222	24	–	29	.453
† – Conference champion ‡ – Tournament champion y – Invited to the NCAA tournament As of June 30, 1988; Rankings from Collegiate Baseball

The 1988 Southeastern Conference baseball tournament was held at Dudy Noble Field in Starkville, MS from May 12 through 15. Florida won the tournament and earned the Southeastern Conference's automatic bid to the 1988 NCAA tournament.

== Regular-season results ==
Team	W	L	Pct	GB	Seed
Florida	21	6	.778	—	1
Kentucky	18	9	.667	3	2
Mississippi State	17	10	.630	4	3
Auburn	16	10	.615	4.5	4
LSU	16	11	.593	5	5
Georgia	11	16	.407	10	6
Vanderbilt	11	16	.407	10	—
Alabama	9	17	.346	11.5	—
Tennessee	9	18	.333	12	—
Ole Miss	6	21	.222	15	—

== Tournament ==
First round
6	Georgia	8
1	Florida	3
2	Kentucky	9
5	LSU	7
4	Auburn	7
3	Mississippi State	10

Second round
6	Georgia	3
5	LSU	7
1	Florida	4
4	Auburn	3
2	Kentucky	5
3	Mississippi State	6
6	Georgia	5
2	Kentucky	4

Third round
5	LSU	2
1	Florida	7
3	Mississippi State	4
6	Georgia	2

Final
1	Florida	3	5
3	Mississippi State	1	3

== All-Tournament Team ==
Position	Player	School
1B	Tommy Raffo	Mississippi State
2B	Vince Castaldo	Kentucky
SS	Brad Hildreth	Mississippi State
3B	Darin Rieman	Kentucky
C	Barry Winford	Mississippi State
OF	Brian Reimsnyder	Florida
OF	Rich Vasquez	LSU
OF	Bruce Chick	Georgia
DH	Mario Linares	Florida
P	Jeff Gidcumb	Florida
P	Mark Lipson	Georgia
MVP	Brian Reimsnyder	Florida

== See also ==
- College World Series
- NCAA Division I Baseball Championship
- Southeastern Conference baseball tournament
