= Tom Singer =

English baseball player (born 1969)

Tom Singer (born 27 April 1969) was an English born baseball player. He spent seven years in minor league baseball and represented the United States national baseball team.

Singer was born in Banbury, United Kingdom. He attended Monsignor McClancy High School and then St. John's University. With St. John's, he pitched against Mike Mussina and Stanford University in the 1988 College World Series regionals. In 1989, he played for Team USA in that year's Intercontinental Cup.

He was drafted by the Toronto Blue Jays in the 10th round of the 1990 Major League Baseball draft. He threw a no-hitter on 5 May 1992, while pitching for the Dunedin Blue Jays against the Fort Myers Miracle. Overall, Singer was 39–45 with a 4.62 ERA in 161 professional games (116 starts).
