= 1988 Trans America Athletic Conference baseball tournament =

American college baseball tournament

- Teams: 2
- Format: Double-elimination
- Finals site: Centenary Park; Shreveport, Louisiana
- Champions: Stetson (1st title)
- Winning coach: Pete Dunn (1st title)
- MVP: Mike Sempeles (Stetson)

1988 Trans America Athletic Conference baseball standings
	Conf.				Overall
Team	W		L	PCT	W		L	PCT
East
Georgia Southern ^{x}‍†‍‍	13	–	4	.765	30	–	27	.526
No. 20 Stetson ‍‍‡‍^{y}	9	–	8	.529	35	–	25	.583
Mercer ‍‍‍	7	–	10	.412	24	–	25	.490
Samford ‍‍‍	5	–	12	.294	8	–	49	.140
West
Centenary ^{x}‍‍‍	11	–	5	.688	30	–	20	.600
Arkansas–Little Rock ‍‍‍	8	–	8	.500	27	–	29	.482
Hardin–Simmons ‍‍‍	5	–	11	.313	30	–	30	.500
x – Division champion † – Conference champion ‡ – Tournament champion y – Invited to the NCAA tournament As of June 30, 1988; Rankings from Collegiate Baseball

The 1988 Trans America Athletic Conference baseball tournament was held at Centenary Park on the campus of Centenary College of Louisiana in Shreveport, Louisiana. This was the tenth tournament championship held by the Trans America Athletic Conference, in its tenth year of existence. Stetson won their first tournament championship and earned the conference's automatic bid to the 1988 NCAA Division I baseball tournament.

== Format and seeding ==
The top two finishers from each division by conference winning percentage qualified for the tournament, with the top seed from one division playing the second seed from the opposite in the first round.

Team	W	L	Pct.	GB	Seed
East
Georgia Southern	13	4	.765	—	1E
Stetson	9	8	.529	4	2E
Mercer	7	10	.412	6	—
Samford	5	12	.294	8	—

Team	W	L	Pct.	GB	Seed
West
Centenary	11	5	.688	—	1W
Arkansas–Little Rock	8	8	.500	3	2W
Hardin–Simmons	5	11	.313	6	—

== Bracket ==
First round
1E	Georgia Southern	14
2W	UALR	13
1W	Centenary	2
2E	Stetson	4
Lower round 1
2W	UALR	5
1W	Centenary	4

Semi-finals
1E	Georgia Southern	2
2E	Stetson	4
Lower final
1E	Georgia Southern	4
2W	UALR	0

Finals
2E	Stetson	5	—
1E	Georgia Southern	3	—

== All-Tournament Team ==
The following players were named to the All-Tournament Team.

POS	Player	School
P	Craig Risdon	Stetson
P	Jeff Jay	Georgia Southern
C	Rob Fitzpatrick	Georgia Southern
1B	Brett Hendley	Georgia Southern
2B	Eloy Garcia	UALR
SS	Eddie Corbett	Stetson
3B	Shawn Lee	Stetson
OF	Roy Gilbert	Centenary
OF	Tom Riginos	Stetson
OF	Mike Sempeles	Stetson
DH	Kevin Weickel	Stetson

=== Most Valuable Player ===
Mike Sempeles was named Tournament Most Valuable Player. Hendley was an outfielder for Stetson.
