= 1988 Cal State Fullerton Titans baseball team =

American college baseball season

1988 Cal State Fullerton Titans baseball

NCAA South Regional champions

College World Series, 2–2
- Conference: Pacific Coast Athletic Association
- Record: 43–18 (12–8 PCAA)
- Head coach: Larry Cochell (1st year)
- Home stadium: Titan Field

1988 Pacific Coast Athletic Association baseball standings
	Conf.						Overall
Team	W		L		T	PCT	W		L		T	PCT
No. 7 Fresno State ‍†‍‍^{y}	20	–	1	–	0	.952	56	–	12	–	0	.824
No. 25 UNLV ‍‍‍^{y}	14	–	7	–	0	.667	40	–	22	–	0	.645
No. 3 Cal State Fullerton ‍‍‍^{y}	12	–	8	–	0	.600	43	–	18	–	0	.705
San Jose State ‍‍‍	9	–	11	–	0	.450	31	–	30	–	0	.508
UC Irvine ‍‍‍	9	–	12	–	0	.429	30	–	28	–	1	.517
Pacific ‍‍‍	9	–	12	–	0	.429	19	–	32	–	0	.373
UC Santa Barbara ‍‍‍	6	–	15	–	0	.286	23	–	39	–	0	.371
Long Beach State ‍‍‍	4	–	17	–	0	.190	14	–	45	–	0	.237
y – Invited to the NCAA tournament As of June 30, 1988; Rankings from Collegiate Baseball

The 1988 Cal State Fullerton Titans baseball team represented California State University, Fullerton in the 1988 NCAA Division I baseball season. The Titans played their home games at Titan Field, and played as part of the Pacific Coast Athletic Association. The team was coached by Larry Cochell in his first season as head coach at Cal State Fullerton.

The Titans reached the College World Series, their fifth appearance in Omaha, where they finished tied for third place after winning games against Miami (FL) and eventual champion Stanford before losing a pair of semifinal matchups with Stanford.

== Personnel ==
=== Roster ===
1988 Cal State Fullerton Titans roster
Pitchers: 4 - Duane Madje - Junior; 9 - Rich Faulks - Sophomore; 15 - Erik Silvey - Junior; 18 - Huck Flener - Freshman; 21 - Longo Garcia - Senior; 22 - Chris Robinson - Freshman; 24 - Mark Beck - Freshman; 25 - Paul Johnson - Junior; 31 - Jim Foley - Junior; 32 - Danny DeVille - Junior; 34 - Matt Watson - Freshman	Catchers: 7 - Brent Mayne - Sophomore; 13 - Shane Flores - Senior; Outfielders: 2 - Jason Rolish - Sophomore; 10 - John Miscovich - Freshman; 17 - Rex Peters - Junior; 23 - Ramiro Garcia - Sophomore; 26 - Bobby Jones - Junior; 27 - Greg Mannion - Senior; 30 - Jim Osborn - Senior; 33 - Scott Talanoa - Freshman	Infielders: 3 - Mark Shimamoto - Freshman; 8 - Mike Ross - Senior; 11 - Kemer Brett - Junior; 12 - Mike Friedland - Junior; 19 - Mark Razook - Junior; 20 - Ralph Ramirez - Junior; 37 - Keith Kaub - Senior

=== Coaches ===
1988 Cal State Fullerton Titans baseball coaching staff
- 1 - Larry Cochell - Head coach - 1st Season
- - Dick Larner - Assistant coach - 2nd Season
- 5 - Dennis Rogers - Assistant coach - 1st Season
- 28 - Rick Vanderhook - Assistant coach - 4th Season
- 6 - Paul Cameron - Graduate Assistant - 1st Season

== Schedule and results ==
Legend
Cal State Fullerton win
Cal State Fullerton loss

1988 Cal State Fullerton Titans baseball game log
Regular season

January
Date	Opponent	Site/Stadium	Score	Overall Record	PCAA Record
Jan 26	Cal Poly Pomona*	Titan Field • Fullerton, CA	W 5–1	1–0	
Jan 28	Chapman*	Titan Field • Fullerton, CA	L 1–8	1–1	
Jan 29	at Chapman*	Orange, CA	W 5–0	2–1	
Jan 30	Chapman*	Titan Field • Fullerton, CA	L 7–10	2–2	

February
Date	Opponent	Site/Stadium	Score	Overall Record	PCAA Record
Feb 3	at USC*	Dedeaux Field • Los Angeles, CA	L 3–7	2–3	
Feb 5	at No. 2 Stanford*	Sunken Diamond • Stanford, CA	W 5–1	3–3	
Feb 6	at Stanford*	Sunken Diamond • Stanford, CA	L 4–9	3–4	
Feb 7	at Stanford*	Sunken Diamond • Stanford, CA	W 6–5	4–4	
Feb 11	at Arizona*	Sancet Stadium • Tucson, AZ	L 9–14	4–5	
Feb 12	at Arizona*	Sancet Stadium • Tucson, AZ	W 22–5	5–5	
Feb 13	at Arizona*	Sancet Stadium • Tucson, AZ	L 6–13	5–6	
Feb 17	Cal State Northridge*	Titan Field • Fullerton, CA	W 13–0	6–6	
Feb 20	The Master's*	Titan Field • Fullerton, CA	W 22–4	7–6	
Feb 23	Pepperdine*	Titan Field • Fullerton, CA	W 2–0	8–6	
Feb 26	US International*	Titan Field • Fullerton, CA	W 7–0	9–6	
Feb 27	US International*	Titan Field • Fullerton, CA	W 5–1^{7}	10–6	
Feb 27	US International*	Titan Field • Fullerton, CA	W 15–8	11–6	

March
Date	Opponent	Site/Stadium	Score	Overall Record	PCAA Record
Mar 2	at No. 18 UCLA*	Jackie Robinson Stadium • Los Angeles, CA	W 12–6	12–7	
Mar 4	Portland*	Titan Field • Fullerton, CA	L 2–4	12–7	
Mar 5	Portland*	Titan Field • Fullerton, CA	W 10–6	13–7	
Mar 6	Portland*	Titan Field • Fullerton, CA	W 5–3	14–7	
Mar 9	San Diego*	Titan Field • Fullerton, CA	W 9–2	15–7	
Mar 11	No. 18 Washington State*	Titan Field • Fullerton, CA	W 7–1	16–7	
Mar 12	No. 18 Washington State*	Titan Field • Fullerton, CA	L 6–7	16–8	
Mar 13	No. 7 Loyola Marymount*	Titan Field • Fullerton, CA	W 3–0	17–8	
Mar 15	at Pepperdine*	Eddy D. Field Stadium • Malibu, CA	W 12–3	18–8	
Mar 18	at Pacific	Klein Family Field • Stockton, CA	W 5–0	19–8	1–0
Mar 19	at Pacific	Klein Family Field • Stockton, CA	W 15–8^{12}	20–8	2–0
Mar 20	at Pacific	Klein Family Field • Stockton, CA	L 6–7^{14}	20–9	2–1
Mar 25	vs No. 12 LSU*	Louisiana Superdome • New Orleans, LA (Bush Challenge II)	W 7–2	21–9	
Mar 26	vs No. 11 New Orleans*	Louisiana Superdome • New Orleans, LA (Bush Challenge II)	W 14–3	22–9	
Mar 27	vs Tulane*	Louisiana Superdome • New Orleans, LA (Bush Challenge II)	W 8–4	23–9	

April
Date	Opponent	Site/Stadium	Score	Overall Record	PCAA Record
Apr 1	UC Santa Barbara	Titan Field • Fullerton, CA	L 6–7	23–10	2–2
Apr 2	UC Santa Barbara	Titan Field • Fullerton, CA	W 8–	24–10	3–2
Apr 3	UC Santa Barbara	Titan Field • Fullerton, CA	W 8–5	25–10	4–2
Apr 8	at Long Beach State	Blair Field • Long Beach, CA	W 9–2	26–10	5–2
Apr 9	at Long Beach State	Blair Field • Long Beach, CA	W 13–3	27–10	6–2
Apr 10	at Long Beach State	Blair Field • Long Beach, CA	W 13–2	28–10	7–2
Apr 13	at US International*	San Diego, CA	W 9–6	29–10	
Apr 15	No. 20 UNLV	Titan Field • Fullerton, CA	W 4–2	30–10	8–2
Apr 16	No. 20 UNLV	Titan Field • Fullerton, CA	L 2–3^{10}	30–11	8–3
Apr 17	No. 20 UNLV	Titan Field • Fullerton, CA	W 6–5^{10}	31–11	9–3
Apr 22	UC Irvine	Titan Field • Fullerton, CA	W 11–7	32–11	10–3
Apr 23	UC Irvine	Titan Field • Fullerton, CA	W 6–5^{10}	33–11	11–3
Apr 24	UC Irvine	Titan Field • Fullerton, CA	W 4–1	34–11	12–3
Apr 26	Cal State Los Angeles*	Titan Field • Fullerton, CA	W 10–7	35–11	
Apr 29	No. 2 Fresno State	Titan Field • Fullerton, CA	L 2–3	35–12	12–4
Apr 30	No. 2 Fresno State	Titan Field • Fullerton, CA	L 3–5	35–13	12–5

May
Date	Opponent	Site/Stadium	Score	Overall Record	PCAA Record
May 1	No. 2 Fresno State	Titan Field • Fullerton, CA	L 8–15	35–14	12–6
May 4	UCLA	Titan Field • Fullerton, CA	W 4–3	36–14	
May 8	at San Jose State	San Jose Municipal Stadium • San Jose, CA	L 4–5	36–15	12–7
May 8	at San Jose State	San Jose Municipal Stadium • San Jose, CA	L 2–11	36–16	12–8
May 11	No. 21 USC*	Titan Field • Fullerton, CA	W 8–4	37–16	

Postseason

NCAA South Regional
Date	Opponent	Seed	Site/Stadium	Score	Overall Record	Reg Record
May 27	(4) Missouri	(3)	Dudy Noble Field • Starkville, MS	W 6–3	38–16	1–0
May 28	(2) Mississippi State	(3)	Dudy Noble Field • Starkville, MS	W 5–1	39–16	2–0
May 29	(2) Mississippi State	(3)	Dudy Noble Field • Starkville, MS	W 5–3	40–16	3–0
May 30	(1) Texas A&M	(3)	Dudy Noble Field • Starkville, MS	W 6–3	41–16	4–0

College World Series
Date	Opponent	Site/Stadium	Score	Overall Record	CWS Record
June 4	Miami (FL)	Johnny Rosenblatt Stadium • Omaha, NE	W 9–3	42–16	1–0
June 6	Stanford	Johnny Rosenblatt Stadium • Omaha, NE	W 5–3	43–16	2–0
June 9	Stanford	Johnny Rosenblatt Stadium • Omaha, NE	L 1–3	43–17	2–1
June 10	Stanford	Johnny Rosenblatt Stadium • Omaha, NE	L 5–9	43–18	2–2
