= 1988 Arizona Wildcats baseball team =

American college baseball season

1988 Arizona Wildcats baseball
- Conference: Pacific-10 Conference
- Record: 33–26 (10–20 Pac-10)
- Head coach: Jerry Kindall (16th season)
- Assistant coaches: Jerry Stitt (10th season); Jim Wing (16th season)
- Home stadium: Sancet Stadium

1988 Pacific-10 Conference baseball standings
| | Conf. | | | | Overall |
| Team | W | | L | PCT | W | | L | PCT |
|---|---|---|---|---|---|---|---|---|
Northern
| No. 16 Washington State ^{x}‍‍‍^{y} | 18 | – | 4 | .818 | 52 | – | 14 | .788 |
| Oregon State ‍‍‍ | 14 | – | 10 | .583 | 30 | – | 19 | .612 |
| Portland State ‍‍‍ | 12 | – | 9 | .571 | 33 | – | 25 | .569 |
| Gonzaga ‍‍‍ | 12 | – | 11 | .522 | 28 | – | 28 | .500 |
| Portland ‍‍‍ | 11 | – | 13 | .458 | 28 | – | 27 | .509 |
| Washington ‍‍‍ | 8 | – | 16 | .333 | 17 | – | 28 | .378 |
| Eastern Washington ‍‍‍ | 6 | – | 18 | .250 | 25 | – | 34 | .424 |
Southern
| No. 2 Arizona State ^{x}‍‍‍^{y} | 21 | – | 9 | .700 | 60 | – | 13 | .822 |
| No. 1 Stanford ‍‍‍^{y} | 18 | – | 12 | .600 | 46 | – | 23 | .667 |
| No. 8 California ‍‍‍^{y} | 16 | – | 14 | .533 | 40 | – | 25 | .615 |
| No. 13 Southern California ‍‍‍^{y} | 13 | – | 17 | .433 | 36 | – | 26 | .581 |
| UCLA ‍‍‍ | 12 | – | 18 | .400 | 31 | – | 28 | .525 |
| Arizona ‍‍‍ | 10 | – | 20 | .333 | 33 | – | 26 | .559 |
x – Division champion y – Invited to the NCAA tournament As of June 30, 1988; Rankings from Collegiate Baseball

The 1988 Arizona Wildcats baseball team represented the University of Arizona during the 1988 NCAA Division I baseball season. The Wildcats played their home games at Frank Sancet Stadium. The team was coached by Jerry Kindall in his 16th season at Arizona. The Wildcats finished 33–26 overall and placed 6th in the Pacific-10's Southern Division with an 10–20 record. Arizona failed to make the postseason for the first time since missing the tournament 4 seasons in a row from 1981 to 1984.

== Previous season ==
The Wildcats finished the 1987 season with a record of 34–26 and 13–17 in conference play, finishing 4th in the "Six-Pac" (Pac-10 Southern). Arizona advanced to the postseason for the 3rd straight season and was placed in the West II Regional hosted by rival Arizona State University at Packard Stadium in Tempe, Arizona. The Wildcats failed to make a 3rd straight College World Series appearance however, losing their first 2 games to Pepperdine and Hawaii to end their season.

== Personnel ==
=== Roster ===
1988 Arizona Wildcats baseball roster
| • Glenn Baxley • Brian Callahan • Todd Devereaux • Lance Dickson • Greg Fowble • Mike Gambino • Wayne Gilles | • Frank Halcovich • Trevor Hoffman • Jason Klonosky • Heath Lane • Rick Lantrip • Mike Ortiz • Kenny Lofton | • Kevin Long • Jim Richardson • Richard Schuman • David Shermet • J.T. Snow • Michael Thorell • Alan Zinter |

=== Coaches ===
1988 Arizona Wildcats baseball coaching staff
- Jerry Kindall - Head coach
- Jerry Stitt - Assistant coach
- Jim Wing - Assistant coach

== 1988 Schedule and results ==
1988 Arizona Wildcats baseball game log
Regular season
| Date | Opponent | Site/Stadium | Score | Overall Record | Pac-10 Record |
|---|---|---|---|---|---|
| Jan 28 | UC Irvine | Sancet Stadium • Tucson, AZ | W 17–6 | 1–0 | |
| Jan 29 | UC Irvine | Sancet Stadium • Tucson, AZ | L 3–10 | 1–1 | |
| Jan 30 | UC Irvine | Sancet Stadium • Tucson, AZ | W 8–2 | 2–1 | |
| Feb 1 | Prairie View A&M | Sancet Stadium • Tucson, AZ | W 14–2 | 3–1 | |
| Feb 2 | Prairie View A&M | Sancet Stadium • Tucson, AZ | W 22–2 | 4–1 | |
| Feb 4 | at Grand Canyon | Brazell Stadium • Phoenix, AZ | W 26–3 | 5–1 | |
| Feb 5 | Grand Canyon | Sancet Stadium • Tucson, AZ | W 13–9 | 6–1 | |
| Feb 6 | Grand Canyon | Sancet Stadium • Tucson, AZ | L 15–16 | 6–2 | |
| Feb 8 | Cal State Dominguez Hills | Sancet Stadium • Tucson, AZ | W 9–5 | 7–2 | |
| Feb 9 | Cal State Dominguez Hills | Sancet Stadium • Tucson, AZ | W 10–8 | 8–2 | |
| Feb 11 | Cal State Fullerton | Sancet Stadium • Tucson, AZ | W 14–9 | 9–2 | |
| Feb 12 | Cal State Fullerton | Sancet Stadium • Tucson, AZ | L 5–22 | 9–3 | |
| Feb 13 | Cal State Fullerton | Sancet Stadium • Tucson, AZ | W 13–6 | 10–3 | |
| Feb 15 | New Mexico State | Sancet Stadium • Tucson, AZ | W 3–2 | 11–3 | |
| Feb 16 | New Mexico State | Sancet Stadium • Tucson, AZ | W 30–6 | 12–3 | |
| Feb 18 | Arkansas | Sancet Stadium • Tucson, AZ | W 12–11 | 13–3 | |
| Feb 19 | Arkansas | Sancet Stadium • Tucson, AZ | W 4–3 | 14–3 | |
| Feb 20 | Arkansas | Sancet Stadium • Tucson, AZ | L 2–7 | 14–4 | |
| Feb 22 | Westmont | Sancet Stadium • Tucson, AZ | W 12–7 | 15–4 | |
| Feb 23 | Westmont | Sancet Stadium • Tucson, AZ | W 9–2 | 16–4 | |
| Feb 26 | at UCLA | Jackie Robinson Stadium • Los Angeles, CA | L 2–9 | 16–5 | 0–1 |
| Feb 27 | at UCLA | Jackie Robinson Stadium • Los Angeles, CA | W 12–6 | 17–5 | 1–1 |
| Mar 4 | California | Sancet Stadium • Tucson, AZ | L 10–12 | 17–6 | 1–2 |
| Mar 5 | California | Sancet Stadium • Tucson, AZ | W 5–3 | 18–6 | 2–2 |
| Mar 6 | California | Sancet Stadium • Tucson, AZ | L 3–4 | 18–7 | 2–3 |
| Mar 7 | Wyoming | Sancet Stadium • Tucson, AZ | W 10–3 | 19–7 | |
| Mar 8 | Wyoming | Sancet Stadium • Tucson, AZ | W 11–5 | 20–7 | |
| Mar 9 | Wyoming | Sancet Stadium • Tucson, AZ | W 7–4 | 21–7 | |
| Mar 12 | USC | Sancet Stadium • Tucson, AZ | L 10–11 | 21–8 | 2–4 |
| Mar 13 | USC | Sancet Stadium • Tucson, AZ | L 7–11 | 21–9 | 2–5 |
| Mar 14 | USC | Sancet Stadium • Tucson, AZ | L 14–15 | 21–10 | 2–6 |
| Mar 15 | at Nevada | Peccole Park • Reno, NV | W 7–3 | 22–10 | |
| Mar 16 | at Nevada | Peccole Park • Reno, NV | W 7–6 | 23–10 | |
| Mar 17 | at Nevada | Peccole Park • Reno, NV | W 17–6 | 24–10 | |
| Mar 18 | at Stanford | Sunken Diamond • Palo Alto, CA | L 0–5 | 24–11 | 2–7 |
| Mar 19 | at Stanford | Sunken Diamond • Palo Alto, CA | L 7–8 | 24–12 | 2–8 |
| Mar 20 | at Stanford | Sunken Diamond • Palo Alto, CA | L 4–5 | 24–13 | 2–9 |
| Mar 25 | Minnesota | Sancet Stadium • Tucson, AZ | L 7–10 | 24–14 | |
| Mar 26 | Minnesota | Sancet Stadium • Tucson, AZ | W 4–2 | 25–14 | |
| Mar 27 | Minnesota | Sancet Stadium • Tucson, AZ | L 11–12 | 25–15 | |
| Apr 1 | at Arizona State | Packard Stadium • Tempe, AZ | L 4–5 | 25–16 | 2–10 |
| Apr 2 | at Arizona State | Packard Stadium • Tempe, AZ | L 3–18 | 25–17 | 2–11 |
| Apr 4 | at Arizona State | Packard Stadium • Tempe, AZ | L 3–6 | 25–18 | 2–12 |
| Apr 8 | Stanford | Sancet Stadium • Tucson, AZ | W 20–5 | 26–18 | 3–12 |
| Apr 9 | Stanford | Sancet Stadium • Tucson, AZ | L 7–10 | 26–19 | 3–13 |
| Apr 10 | Stanford | Sancet Stadium • Tucson, AZ | W 9–8 | 27–19 | 4–13 |
| Apr 15 | at USC | Dedeaux Field • Los Angeles, CA | W 8–3 | 28–19 | 5–13 |
| Apr 16 | at USC | Dedeaux Field • Los Angeles, CA | L 1–7 | 28–20 | 5–14 |
| Apr 17 | at USC | Dedeaux Field • Los Angeles, CA | W 13–4 | 29–20 | 6–14 |
| Apr 18 | at UCLA | Jackie Robinson Stadium • Los Angeles, CA | L 8–9 | 29–21 | 6–15 |
| Apr 22 | UCLA | Sancet Stadium • Tucson, AZ | L 4–9 | 29–22 | 6–16 |
| Apr 23 | UCLA | Sancet Stadium • Tucson, AZ | W 8–5 | 30–22 | 7–16 |
| Apr 24 | UCLA | Sancet Stadium • Tucson, AZ | W 17–0 | 31–22 | 8–16 |
| Apr 29 | at California | Evans Diamond • Berkeley, CA | W 11–3 | 32–22 | 9–16 |
| Apr 30 | at California | Evans Diamond • Berkeley, CA | L 4–5 | 32–23 | 9–17 |
| May 1 | at California | Evans Diamond • Berkeley, CA | L 4–7 | 32–24 | 9–18 |
| May 13 | Arizona State | Sancet Stadium • Tucson, AZ | L 2–14 | 32–25 | 9–19 |
| May 14 | Arizona State | Sancet Stadium • Tucson, AZ | L 7–11 | 32–26 | 9–20 |
| May 15 | Arizona State | Sancet Stadium • Tucson, AZ | W 9–6 | 33–26 | 10–20 |

== 1988 MLB draft ==
| Player | Position | Round | Overall | MLB team |
|---|---|---|---|---|
| Dave Shermet | OF | 12 | 298 | Houston Astros |
| Heath Lane | RHP | 16 | 419 | Milwaukee Brewers |
| Kenny Lofton | OF | 17 | 428 | Houston Astros |
| Frank Halcovich | OF | 22 | 569 | Kansas City Royals |
| Greg Fowble | INF | 49 | 1223 | Cleveland Indians |
