= 1988 NCAA Division II baseball tournament =

- Season: 1988
- Finals site: Paterson Field; Montgomery, Alabama
- Champions: Florida Southern (7th title)
- Runner-up: Sacramento State (1st CWS Appearance)
- Winning coach: Chuck Anderson (2nd title)
- MOP: Chris Leach (OF) (Florida Southern)
- Attendance: 12,169

The 1988 NCAA Division II baseball tournament was the postseason tournament hosted by the NCAA to determine the national champion of baseball among its Division II colleges and universities at the end of the 1988 NCAA Division II baseball season.

The final, six-team double-elimination tournament was played at Paterson Field in Montgomery, Alabama.

Florida Southern defeated Sacramento State, 5–4 (after 12 innings), in the final, the Moccasins' seventh Division II national title and first since 1985. Florida Southern was coached by Chuck Anderson.

== Bracket ==
=== College World Series ===
First Round
Florida Southern	5
New Haven	2
Jacksonville State	0
Sacramento State	3
Armstrong State	4
Lewis	5

Second Round
Florida Southern	11
Armstrong State	9
Sacramento State	5
Lewis	3
New Haven	8
Jacksonville State	7

Third Round
Florida Southern	9
Sacramento State	2
Lewis	6
New Haven	1

Semifinal
Sacramento State	8
Lewis	2

Championship
Florida Southern	5^{12}
Sacramento State	4

== See also ==
- 1988 NCAA Division I baseball tournament
- 1988 NCAA Division III baseball tournament
- 1988 NAIA World Series
- 1988 NCAA Division II softball tournament
