= 1988 NCAA Division III baseball tournament =

- Season: 1988
- Teams: 24
- Finals site: Muzzy Field; Bristol, Connecticut
- Champions: Ithaca (2nd title)
- Runner-up: Wisconsin-Oshkosh

The 1988 NCAA Division III baseball tournament was played at the end of the 1988 NCAA Division III baseball season to determine the 13th national champion of college baseball at the NCAA Division III level. The tournament concluded with six teams competing at a new location at Muzzy Field in Bristol, Connecticut, for the championship. Six regional tournaments were held to determine the participants in the World Series. Regional tournaments were contested in double-elimination format, with one region consisting of six teams, four regions consisting of four teams, and one region consisting of two teams, which was played as best-of-five, for a total of 24 teams participating in the tournament. The tournament champion was Ithaca, who defeated Wisconsin-Oshkosh for the championship.

== See also ==
- 1988 NCAA Division I baseball tournament
- 1988 NCAA Division II baseball tournament
- 1988 NCAA Division III softball tournament
- 1988 NAIA World Series
