= 1988 NCAA Division II softball tournament =

- Format: Double-elimination tournament
- Finals site: Sacramento, California
- Champions: Cal State Bakersfield (1st title)
- Runner-up: Lock Haven (1st title game)
- Winning coach: Kathy Welter (1st title)
- Attendance: 4,157

The 1988 NCAA Division II softball tournament was the seventh annual postseason tournament hosted by the NCAA to determine the national champion of softball among its Division II members in the United States, held at the end of the 1988 NCAA Division II softball season.

The final, four-team double elimination tournament, also known as the Division II Women's College World Series, was played in Sacramento, California.

Emerging from the loser's bracket and in their first ever appearance in the tournament, Cal State Bakersfield defeated Lock Haven in a two-game championship series (4–3, 4–3) to capture the Roadrunners' first Division II national title.

== Bracket ==
=== Finals ===
First Round
Lock Haven	1^{(11)}
Cal State Northridge	0
Winner's bracket
Cal State Bakersfield	3
NE Missouri State	0
Cal State Northridge	4
NE Missouri State	0
Loser's bracket

Semifinals
Lock Haven	3^{(9)}
Cal State Bakersfield	2
Cal State Bakersfield	2
Cal State Northridge	1

Championship
Lock Haven	3	3
Cal State Bakersfield	4^{(13)}	4

== All-tournament team ==
- Lisa Suppan, 1B, Lock Haven
- Barb Santa Cruz, 2B, CSU Bakersfield
- Andrea Bambrough, 2B, Northeast Missouri State
- Sas Trotter, SS, CSU Bakersfield
- Vicki DiVittorio, 3B, Lock Haven
- Lisa Erickson, OF, CSU Northridge
- Amie Zimmerman, OF, Lock Haven
- Janice Heriford, OF, CSU Bakersfield
- Beth Onestinghel, OF, CSU Northridge
- Debbie Dickman, P, CSU Northridge
- Sandy Hess, P, Lock Haven
- Margaret Harvey, P, CSU Bakersfield
- Kim Hasson, C, Lock Haven
- Teri Reifel, C, CSU Bakersfield
- Lisa Martin, DP, CSU Northridge

== See also ==
- 1988 NCAA Division I softball tournament
- 1988 NCAA Division III softball tournament
- 1988 NAIA softball tournament
- 1988 NCAA Division II baseball tournament
