= 1988 Arizona State Sun Devils baseball team =

American college baseball season

1988 Arizona State Sun Devils baseball

Pac-10 Conference champions West II Regional champions

College World Series, 2nd
- Conference: Pac-10 Conference
- CB: No. 2
- Record: 60–13 (21–9 Pac-10)
- Head coach: Jim Brock (16th year)
- Home stadium: Packard Stadium

1988 Pacific-10 Conference baseball standings
	Conf.				Overall
Team	W		L	PCT	W		L	PCT
Northern
No. 16 Washington State ^{x}‍‍‍^{y}	18	–	4	.818	52	–	14	.788
Oregon State ‍‍‍	14	–	10	.583	30	–	19	.612
Portland State ‍‍‍	12	–	9	.571	33	–	25	.569
Gonzaga ‍‍‍	12	–	11	.522	28	–	28	.500
Portland ‍‍‍	11	–	13	.458	28	–	27	.509
Washington ‍‍‍	8	–	16	.333	17	–	28	.378
Eastern Washington ‍‍‍	6	–	18	.250	25	–	34	.424
Southern
No. 2 Arizona State ^{x}‍‍‍^{y}	21	–	9	.700	60	–	13	.822
No. 1 Stanford ‍‍‍^{y}	18	–	12	.600	46	–	23	.667
No. 8 California ‍‍‍^{y}	16	–	14	.533	40	–	25	.615
No. 13 Southern California ‍‍‍^{y}	13	–	17	.433	36	–	26	.581
UCLA ‍‍‍	12	–	18	.400	31	–	28	.525
Arizona ‍‍‍	10	–	20	.333	33	–	26	.559
x – Division champion y – Invited to the NCAA tournament As of June 30, 1988; Rankings from Collegiate Baseball

The 1988 Arizona State Sun Devils baseball team represented Arizona State University in the 1988 NCAA Division I baseball season. The Sun Devils played their home games at Packard Stadium. The team was coached by Jim Brock in his sixteenth season at Arizona State.

The Sun Devils reached the College World Series, finishing as the runner up to Stanford.

== Roster ==
1988 Arizona State Sun Devils roster
– Dave Barr; – Freddie Combs; – Pete Gleason; – Tucker Hammargren; – Anthony Manahan; − Brent Bush; – Rob Mattson; – Martin Peralta; – Joe Rocha	Pitchers: – David Cassidy; – Kurt Dempster; – Brian Dodd; – Gordy Farmer; – Scott Hutson; – Linty Ingram; – Rusty Kilgo; – Blas Minor	Infielders: – John Finn; – Kevin Higgins; – Pat Listach; - Tom Cosand; – Steve Willis; Catchers: – Tim Spehr	Outfielders: – Mike Burrola; – Ricky Candelari; - Brian Coleman; – Dan Rumsey

== Schedule ==
Legend
Arizona State win
Arizona State loss

1988 Arizona State Sun Devils baseball game log
Regular season

January
Date	Opponent	Site/stadium	Score	Overall record	Pac-10 record
Jan 21	UC Santa Barbara*	Packard Stadium • Tempe, AZ	W 4–3	1–0	
Jan 22	UC Santa Barbara*	Packard Stadium • Tempe, AZ	W 9–3	2–0	
Jan 23	UC Santa Barbara*	Packard Stadium • Tempe, AZ	W 15–2	3–0	
Jan 29	UC Riverside*	Packard Stadium • Tempe, AZ	W 6–0	4–0	
Jan 30	UC Riverside*	Packard Stadium • Tempe, AZ	W 4–3	5–0	

February
Date	Opponent	Site/stadium	Score	Overall record	Pac-10 record
Feb 1	Cal State Northridge*	Packard Stadium • Tempe, AZ	W 14–4	6–0	
Feb 2	Cal State Northridge*	Packard Stadium • Tempe, AZ	W 10–0	7–0	
Feb 4	Loyola Marymount*	Packard Stadium • Tempe, AZ	W 14–3	8–0	
Feb 5	Loyola Marymount*	Packard Stadium • Tempe, AZ	L 6–18	8–1	
Feb 6	Loyola Marymount*	Packard Stadium • Tempe, AZ	W 7–1	9–1	
Feb 9	Cal Baptist*	Packard Stadium • Tempe, AZ	W 6–0	10–1	
Feb 10	Cal Baptist*	Packard Stadium • Tempe, AZ	W 13–5	11–1	
Feb 13	at Texas*	Disch–Falk Field • Austin, TX	W 15–2	12–1	
Feb 14	at Texas*	Disch–Falk Field • Austin, TX	W 8–5	13–1	
Feb 15	at Texas*	Disch–Falk Field • Austin, TX	W 5–4	14–1	
Feb 16	Chapman*	Packard Stadium • Tempe, AZ	W 9–3	15–1	
Feb 17	Chapman*	Packard Stadium • Tempe, AZ	W 10–6	16–1	
Feb 19	at UCLA	Jackie Robinson Stadium • Los Angeles, CA	W 12–7	17–1	1–0
Feb 20	at UCLA*	Jackie Robinson Stadium • Los Angeles, CA	L 5–9	17–2	1–1
Feb 21	at UCLA*	Jackie Robinson Stadium • Los Angeles, CA	W 15–8	18–2	2–1
Feb 23	Lubbock Christian*	Packard Stadium • Tempe, AZ	W 9–5	19–2	
Feb 24	Lubbock Christian*	Packard Stadium • Tempe, AZ	W 6–2	20–2	
Feb 26	California	Packard Stadium • Tempe, AZ	L 3–10	20–3	2–2
Feb 27	California	Packard Stadium • Tempe, AZ	L 3–4	20–4	2–3
Feb 28	California	Packard Stadium • Tempe, AZ	L 1–2	20–5	2–4

March
Date	Opponent	Site/stadium	Score	Overall record	Pac-10 record
Mar 4	at Southern California	Dedeaux Field • Los Angeles, CA	L 3–5	20–6	2–5
Mar 5	at Southern California	Dedeaux Field • Los Angeles, CA	L 1–4	20–6	2–6
Mar 6	at Southern California	Dedeaux Field • Los Angeles, CA	L 4–7	20–7	2–7
Mar 11	at Hawaii*	Rainbow Stadium • Honolulu, HI	W 11–3	21–8	
Mar 12	at Hawaii*	Rainbow Stadium • Honolulu, HI	W 6–4	22–8	
Mar 13	at Hawaii*	Rainbow Stadium • Honolulu, HI	W 4–1	23–8	
Mar 18	Tennessee*	Packard Stadium • Tempe, AZ	W 13–4	24–8	
Mar 19	Tennessee*	Packard Stadium • Tempe, AZ	W 9–0	25–8	
Mar 19	Tennessee*	Packard Stadium • Tempe, AZ	W 4–3	26–8	
Mar 21	UNLV*	Packard Stadium • Tempe, AZ	W 4–0	27–8	
Mar 22	UNLV*	Packard Stadium • Tempe, AZ	W 8–6	28–8	
Mar 23	Minnesota*	Packard Stadium • Tempe, AZ	W 7–5	29–8	
Mar 25	Stanford	Packard Stadium • Tempe, AZ	W 9–1	30–8	3–7
Mar 26	Stanford	Packard Stadium • Tempe, AZ	W 11–10	31–8	4–7
Mar 27	Stanford	Packard Stadium • Tempe, AZ	W 10–7	32–8	5–7
Mar 31	Arizona	Packard Stadium • Tempe, AZ	W 5–4	33–8	6–7

April
Date	Opponent	Site/stadium	Score	Overall record	Pac-10 record
Apr 1	Arizona	Packard Stadium • Tempe, AZ	W 18–3	34–8	7–7
Apr 2	Arizona	Packard Stadium • Tempe, AZ	W 6–3	35–8	8–7
Apr 8	Southern California	Packard Stadium • Tempe, AZ	W 8–7^{11}	36–8	9–7
Apr 9	Southern California	Packard Stadium • Tempe, AZ	W 8–4	37–8	10–7
Apr 10	Southern California	Packard Stadium • Tempe, AZ	W 9–7	38–8	11–7
Apr 12	New Mexico State*	Packard Stadium • Tempe, AZ	W 9–3	39–8	
Apr 13	New Mexico State*	Packard Stadium • Tempe, AZ	W 18–9	40–8	
Apr 15	at California	Evans Diamond • Berkeley, CA	W 6–4	41–8	12–7
Apr 16	at California	Evans Diamond • Berkeley, CA	W 12–9	42–8	13–7
Apr 17	at California	Evans Diamond • Berkeley, CA	W 3–1	43–8	14–7
Apr 22	at Stanford	Sunken Diamond • Stanford, CA	L 3–5	43–9	14–8
Apr 23	at Stanford	Sunken Diamond • Stanford, CA	W 15–6	44–9	15–8
Apr 24	at Stanford	Sunken Diamond • Stanford, CA	W 13–5	45–9	16–8
Apr 29	UCLA	Packard Stadium • Tempe, AZ	W 17–6	46–9	17–8
Apr 30	UCLA	Packard Stadium • Tempe, AZ	W 6–5	47–9	18–8

May
Date	Opponent	Site/stadium	Score	Overall record	Pac-10 record
May 1	UCLA	Packard Stadium • Tempe, AZ	W 21–7	48–9	19–8
May 4	UNLV*	Packard Stadium • Tempe, AZ	W 6–4	49–9	
May 4	UNLV*	Packard Stadium • Tempe, AZ	W 14–7	50–9	
May 13	at Arizona	Frank Sancet Stadium • Tucson, AZ	W 14–2	51–9	20–8
May 14	at Arizona	Frank Sancet Stadium • Tucson, AZ	W 11–7	52–9	21–8
May 15	at Arizona	Frank Sancet Stadium • Tucson, AZ	L 6–9	52–10	21–9

Post-season

NCAA West II Regional
Date	Opponent	Site/stadium	Score	Overall record	NCAAT record
May 20	Evansville	Packard Stadium • Tempe, AZ	L 0–1	52–11	0–1
May 21	Oklahoma Sooners baseball	Packard Stadium • Tempe, AZ	W 13–6	53–11	1–1
May 21	UNLV	Packard Stadium • Tempe, AZ	W 27–7	54–11	2–1
May 22	Pepperdine	Packard Stadium • Tempe, AZ	W 11–4	55–11	3–1
May 22	Pepperdine	Packard Stadium • Tempe, AZ	W 10–5	56–11	4–1

College World Series
Date	Opponent	Site/stadium	Score	Overall record	CWS record	
June 3	California		Johnny Rosenblatt Stadium • Omaha, NE	W 4–2	57–11	1–0
May 5	Wichita State	Johnny Rosenblatt Stadium • Omaha, NE	L 4–7	57–12	1–1	
May 7	Florida	Johnny Rosenblatt Stadium • Omaha, NE	W 10–1	58–12	2–1	
May 8	Wichita State	Johnny Rosenblatt Stadium • Omaha, NE	W 4–3^{10}	59–12	3–1	
May 10	Wichita State	Johnny Rosenblatt Stadium • Omaha, NE	W 19–1	60–12	4–1	
May 11	Stanford	Johnny Rosenblatt Stadium • Omaha, NE	L 4–9	60–13	4–2	
