= 1988 Fresno State Bulldogs baseball team =

American college baseball season

1988 Fresno State Bulldogs baseball

PCAA champions West I Regional champions

College World Series, T-7th
- Conference: Pacific Coast Athletic Association
- CB: No. 7
- Record: 56–12 (20–1 PCAA)
- Head coach: Bob Bennett (21st season)
- Home stadium: Pete Beiden Field

1988 Pacific Coast Athletic Association baseball standings
	Conf.						Overall
Team	W		L		T	PCT	W		L		T	PCT
No. 7 Fresno State ‍†‍‍^{y}	20	–	1	–	0	.952	56	–	12	–	0	.824
No. 25 UNLV ‍‍‍^{y}	14	–	7	–	0	.667	40	–	22	–	0	.645
No. 3 Cal State Fullerton ‍‍‍^{y}	12	–	8	–	0	.600	43	–	18	–	0	.705
San Jose State ‍‍‍	9	–	11	–	0	.450	31	–	30	–	0	.508
UC Irvine ‍‍‍	9	–	12	–	0	.429	30	–	28	–	1	.517
Pacific ‍‍‍	9	–	12	–	0	.429	19	–	32	–	0	.373
UC Santa Barbara ‍‍‍	6	–	15	–	0	.286	23	–	39	–	0	.371
Long Beach State ‍‍‍	4	–	17	–	0	.190	14	–	45	–	0	.237
y – Invited to the NCAA tournament As of June 30, 1988; Rankings from Collegiate Baseball

The 1988 Fresno State Bulldogs baseball team represented Fresno State College in the 1988 NCAA Division I baseball season. The Bulldogs played their home games at Pete Beiden Field. The team was coached by Bob Bennett in his 21st year as head coach at Fresno State.

The Bulldogs won the West I Regional to advance to the College World Series, where they were defeated by the Miami Hurricanes.

== Roster ==
1988 Fresno State Bulldogs baseball team
Players
Coaches

#	Pos.	Name	B/T	Height	Weight	Year	Home town
	RHP	Ken Baker	/R	—	—
	RHP	Eric Bridge	/R	—	—
	RHP	Steve Buckholz	R/R	6 ft 4 in (1.93 m)	210 lb (95 kg)	Jr
	OF	Mike Burton	R/R	6 ft 1 in (1.85 m)	218 lb (99 kg)	Jr	Visalia, California
	OF	Eddie Bustamonte	/	—	—	Jr
	LHP	Rich Crane	L/L	6 ft 0 in (1.83 m)	185 lb (84 kg)	So
		Terance Frazier	/	—	—
		Jon French	/	—	—
	OF	Tom Goodwin	L/R	6 ft 1 in (1.85 m)	165 lb (75 kg)	So	Fresno, California
	C	Mike Hill	/	—	—
	C	Todd Hill	/	—	—
	OF	Steve Hosey	R/R	6 ft 3 in (1.91 m)	215 lb (98 kg)	So	Oakland, California
	OF	Todd Littlejohn	/	—	—
	LHP	Tim Lockhart	/L	—	—	Jr
	OF	Steve Lozano	/	—	—
		Bryan Marsoobian	/	—	—	Sr
	C	Brandon Mitchell	/	—	—	Sr
	LHP	Tony Mortensen	/L	—	—
	OF	Jeff Mott	/	—	—	Jr
	OF	Mike Noel	/	—	—
	INF	Steve Pearse	/	—	—	Sr
	C	Tom Phillips	S/R	6 ft 5 in (1.96 m)	215 lb (98 kg)
		Pat Ruth	/	—	—
	RHP	John Salles	R/R	6 ft 0 in (1.83 m)	190 lb (86 kg)	Jr	Fresno, California
	RHP	Erik Schullstrom	R/R	6 ft 4 in (1.93 m)	205 lb (93 kg)	Fr	San Diego, California
	INF	Lance Shebelut	R/R	6 ft 2 in (1.88 m)	200 lb (91 kg)
	INF	Steve Vondran	R/R	6 ft 0 in (1.83 m)	190 lb (86 kg)	Jr
		Cary Windes	/	—	—	Fr
	OF	Kurt Wohlman	/	—	—
	RHP	Steve Wolf	R/R	6 ft 2 in (1.88 m)	195 lb (88 kg)	Fr	Lodi, California
	INF	Eddie Zosky	R/R	6 ft 0 in (1.83 m)	175 lb (79 kg)	So	Whittier, California

Head coach

Bob Bennett

Assistant coach(es)

Legend

- (C) Team captain
- (S) Suspended
- (I) Ineligible
- Injured
- Current redshirt

Roster
Last update: October 25, 2021

== Schedule ==
1988 Fresno State Bulldogs baseball game log
Regular season
February (12–5)

#	Date	Opponent	Site/stadium	Score	Overall record	PCAA record
1	February 2	Cal Poly Pomona	Pete Beiden Field • Fresno, California	8–9	0–1	–
2	February 3	Cal Poly Pomona	Pete Beiden Field • Fresno, California	10–5	1–1	–
3	February 5	at California	Evans Diamond • Berkeley, California	14–12	2–1	–
4	February 6	at California	Evans Diamond • Berkeley, California	12–15	2–2	–
5	February 7	at California	Evans Diamond • Berkeley, California	5–6	2–3	–
6	February 13	at San Diego	John Cunningham Stadium • San Diego, California	14–12	3–3	–
7	February 14	at San Diego	John Cunningham Stadium • San Diego, California	7–1	4–3	–
8	February 15	at San Diego	John Cunningham Stadium • San Diego, California	4–9	4–4	–
9	February 17	Cal Poly	Pete Beiden Field • Fresno, California	6–1	5–4	–
10	February 19	St. Mary's	Pete Beiden Field • Fresno, California	11–4	6–4	–
11	February 20	St. Mary's	Pete Beiden Field • Fresno, California	3–0	7–4	–
12	February 21	St. Mary's	Pete Beiden Field • Fresno, California	8–0	8–4	–
13	February 23	Cal State Dominguez Hills	Pete Beiden Field • Fresno, California	4–7	8–5	–
14	February 24	Cal State Dominguez Hills	Pete Beiden Field • Fresno, California	11–1	9–5	–
15	February 26	Nevada	Pete Beiden Field • Fresno, California	18–1	10–5	–
16	February 27	Nevada	Pete Beiden Field • Fresno, California	9–1	11–5	–
17	February 28	Nevada	Pete Beiden Field • Fresno, California	15–1	12–5	–

March (18–1)

#	Date	Opponent	Site/stadium	Score	Overall record	PCAA record
18	March 1	Cal State Los Angeles	Pete Beiden Field • Fresno, California	7–4	13–5	–
19	March 2	Cal State Los Angeles	Pete Beiden Field • Fresno, California	14–4	14–5	–
20	March 4	Gonzaga	Pete Beiden Field • Fresno, California	11–5	15–5	–
21	March 5	Gonzaga	Pete Beiden Field • Fresno, California	8–7	16–5	–
22	March 6	Gonzaga	Pete Beiden Field • Fresno, California	15–5	17–5	–
23	March 8	Cal State Northridge	Pete Beiden Field • Fresno, California	2–5	17–6	–
24	March 9	Cal State Northridge	Pete Beiden Field • Fresno, California	10–3	18–6	–
25	March 12	San Francisco	Pete Beiden Field • Fresno, California	10–7	19–6	–
26	March 14	Texas A&M	Pete Beiden Field • Fresno, California	6–5	20–6	–
27	March 15	George Washington	Pete Beiden Field • Fresno, California	17–2	21–6	–
28	March 16	Oregon State	Pete Beiden Field • Fresno, California	12–10	22–6	–
29	March 17	Clemson	Pete Beiden Field • Fresno, California	13–10	23–6	–
30	March 18	BYU	Pete Beiden Field • Fresno, California	7–4	24–6	–
31	March 19	Texas A&M	Pete Beiden Field • Fresno, California	4–0	25–6	–
32	March 22	Stanford	Pete Beiden Field • Fresno, California	13–3	26–6	–
33	March 25	Long Beach State	Pete Beiden Field • Fresno, California	19–0	27–6	1–0
34	March 26	Long Beach State	Pete Beiden Field • Fresno, California	15–0	28–6	2–0
35	March 27	Long Beach State	Pete Beiden Field • Fresno, California	14–3	29–6	3–0
36	March 31	UC Irvine	Pete Beiden Field • Fresno, California	4–2	30–6	4–0

April (18–0)

#	Date	Opponent	Site/stadium	Score	Overall record	PCAA record
37	April 1	UC Irvine	Pete Beiden Field • Fresno, California	16–2	31–6	5–0
38	April 2	UC Irvine	Pete Beiden Field • Fresno, California	4–0	32–6	6–0
39	April 5	Loyola Marymount	Pete Beiden Field • Fresno, California	6–1	33–6	6–0
40	April 6	Loyola Marymount	Pete Beiden Field • Fresno, California	18–6	34–6	6–0
41	April 8	San Jose State	Pete Beiden Field • Fresno, California	17–3	35–6	7–0
42	April 9	San Jose State	Pete Beiden Field • Fresno, California	10–1	36–6	8–0
43	April 10	San Jose State	Pete Beiden Field • Fresno, California	7–1	37–6	9–0
44	April 12	Cal Poly	Pete Beiden Field • Fresno, California	17–7	38–6	9–0
45	April 16	at UC Santa Barbara	Caesar Uyesaka Stadium • Santa Barbara, California	4–2	39–6	10–0
46	April 17	at UC Santa Barbara	Caesar Uyesaka Stadium • Santa Barbara, California	8–5	40–6	11–0
47	April 18	at UC Santa Barbara	Caesar Uyesaka Stadium • Santa Barbara, California	10–3	41–6	12–0
48	April 23	BYU	Pete Beiden Field • Fresno, California	7–3	42–6	12–0
49	April 24	Pacific	Pete Beiden Field • Fresno, California	4–1	43–6	13–0
50	April 25	Pacific	Pete Beiden Field • Fresno, California	18–1	44–6	14–0
51	April 26	Pacific	Pete Beiden Field • Fresno, California	14–6	45–6	15–0
52	April 27	Stanford	Pete Beiden Field • Fresno, California	6–5	46–6	15–0
53	April 29	at Cal State Fullerton	Titan Field • Fullerton, California	3–2	47–6	16–0
54	April 30	at Cal State Fullerton	Titan Field • Fullerton, California	5–3	48–6	17–0

May (3–3)

#	Date	Opponent	Site/stadium	Score	Overall record	PCAA record
55	May 1	at Cal State Fullerton	Titan Field • Fullerton, California	15–8	49–6	18–0
56	May 3	at Santa Clara	Buck Shaw Stadium • Santa Clara, California	9–10	49–7	18–0
57	May 4	at Santa Clara	Buck Shaw Stadium • Santa Clara, California	3–4	49–8	18–0
58	May 6	at UNLV	Roger Barnson Field • Paradise, Nevada	8–12	49–9	18–1
59	May 7	at UNLV	Roger Barnson Field • Paradise, Nevada	9–4	50–9	19–1
60	May 8	at UNLV	Roger Barnson Field • Paradise, Nevada	11–6	51–9	20–1

Postseason
West I Regional (5–1)

#	Date	Opponent	Site/stadium	Score	Overall record	PCAA record
61	May 26	Minnesota	Pete Beiden Field • Fresno, California	10–8	52–9	20–1
62	May 27	BYU	Pete Beiden Field • Fresno, California	7–6	53–9	20–1
63	May 28	Southern California	Pete Beiden Field • Fresno, California	17–18	53–10	20–1
64	May 29	Washington State	Pete Beiden Field • Fresno, California	7–6	54–10	20–1
65	May 30	Southern California	Pete Beiden Field • Fresno, California	17–12	55–10	20–1
66	May 30	Southern California	Pete Beiden Field • Fresno, California	14–3	56–10	20–1

College World Series (0–2)

#	Date	Opponent	Site/stadium	Score	Overall record	PCAA record
67	June 2	vs Stanford	Johnny Rosenblatt Stadium • Omaha, Nebraska	3–10	56–11	20–1
68	June 3	vs Miami (FL)	Johnny Rosenblatt Stadium • Omaha, Nebraska	4–8	56–12	20–1

== Awards and honors ==
Rich Crane

- Third Team All-American Baseball America
- First Team All-PCAA

Tom Goodwin

- First Team All-American American Baseball Coaches Association
- First Team All-American Baseball America
- First Team All-West I Regional
- First Team All-PCAA

Steve Hosey

- Third Team All-American Baseball America
- First Team All-PCAA

Jeff Mott

- Second Team All-PCAA

Steve Pearse

- First Team All-American American Baseball Coaches Association
- First Team All-West I Regional
- First Team All-PCAA

John Salles

- First Team All-American American Baseball Coaches Association
- Second Team All-American Baseball America
- First Team All-West I Regional
- First Team All-PCAA

Erik Schullstrom

- First Team Freshman All-American Baseball America
- First Team All-PCAA

Lance Shebelut

- First Team All-American American Baseball Coaches Association
- First Team All-American Baseball America
- First Team All-West I Regional
- First Team All-PCAA
- Pacific Coast Athletic Association Player of the Year

Eddie Zosky

- First Team All-West I Regional
- First Team All-PCAA
