= 1988 Miami Hurricanes baseball team =

American college baseball season

1988 Miami Hurricanes baseball

NCAA Atlantic Regional champions

College World Series, 1–2
- Conference: Independent
- CB: No. 5
- Record: 52–14–1
- Head coach: Ron Fraser (26th year)
- Home stadium: Mark Light Field

1988 NCAA Division I baseball independents standings
	Conf.						Overall
Team	W		L		T	PCT	W		L		T	PCT
No. 5 Miami (FL) ‍‍‍^{y}	0	–	0	–	0	–	52	–	14	–	1	.784
Delaware State ‍‍‍	0	–	0	–	0	–	25	–	11	–	0	.694
New Mexico State ‍‍‍	0	–	0	–	0	–	38	–	18	–	0	.679
FIU ‍‍‍	0	–	0	–	0	–	40	–	19	–	0	.678
UCF ‍‍‍	0	–	0	–	0	–	40	–	20	–	0	.667
Florida A&M ‍‍‍	0	–	0	–	0	–	26	–	13	–	0	.667
No. 28 Tulane ‍‍‍^{y}	0	–	0	–	0	–	32	–	18	–	0	.640
Southwestern Louisiana ‍‍‍^{y}	0	–	0	–	0	–	30	–	18	–	0	.625
UMBC ‍‍‍	0	–	0	–	0	–	25	–	16	–	0	.610
Nicholls State ‍‍‍	0	–	0	–	0	–	28	–	21	–	0	.571
Akron ‍‍‍	0	–	0	–	0	–	28	–	31	–	0	.475
United States International ‍‍‍	0	–	0	–	0	–	18	–	26	–	0	.409
Northern Colorado ‍‍‍	0	–	0	–	0	–	19	–	28	–	0	.404
Chicago State ‍‍‍	0	–	0	–	0	–	18	–	29	–	0	.383
Liberty ‍‍‍	0	–	0	–	0	–	18	–	32	–	0	.360
Boston University ‍‍‍	0	–	0	–	0	–	7	–	17	–	0	.292
Bethune–Cookman ‍‍‍	0	–	0	–	0	–	9	–	23	–	0	.281
Maryland Eastern Shore ‍‍‍	0	–	0	–	0	–	7	–	24	–	0	.226
y – Invited to the NCAA tournament As of June 30, 1988; Rankings from Collegiate Baseball

The 1988 Miami Hurricanes baseball team represented the University of Miami in the 1988 NCAA Division I baseball season. The Hurricanes played their home games at Mark Light Field. The team was coached by Ron Fraser in his 26th season at Miami.

The Hurricanes reached the College World Series, where they finished tied for fifth after recording a win against Fresno State and losses to eventual semifinalist Cal State Fullerton and champion Stanford.

== Personnel ==
=== Roster ===
1988 Miami Hurricanes roster
Pitchers: - Joe Grahe; - Greg Knowles; - Kurt Knudsen; - Steffen Majer; - Oscar Múñoz; - Steve Tucker; - Will Vespe; Catchers: - Frank Dominguez	Infielders: - Jorge Robles; - Mike Tosar; - Mark Mitchell; Outfielders: - Mike Fiore; - Rey Noriega	Unknown: - Chris Anderson; - Dan Bruckner; - Doug DeKock; - Bob Hernandez; - Henry Hernandez; - Chris Hirsch; - Pete Joseph; - Albert Pacheco; - Darrell Sparkman; - Sean Stall; - John Viera; - Rob Word; - Tom James

=== Coaches ===
1988 Miami Hurricanes baseball coaching staff
- Ron Fraser – Head coach – 26th year

== Schedule and results ==
Legend
Miami win
Miami loss
Tie

1988 Miami Hurricanes baseball game log
Regular season

February
Date	Opponent	Site/stadium	Score	Overall record
Feb 5	Mercer	Mark Light Field • Coral Gables, FL	W 9–0	1–0
Feb 6	Mercer	Mark Light Field • Coral Gables, FL	W 24–1^{7}	2–0
Feb 7	Mercer	Mark Light Field • Coral Gables, FL	W 17–7	3–0
Feb 12	South Florida	Mark Light Field • Coral Gables, FL	W 1–0	4–0
Feb 13	South Florida	Mark Light Field • Coral Gables, FL	W 4–3	5–0
Feb 14	Seton Hall	Mark Light Field • Coral Gables, FL	W 9–4	6–0
Feb 16	Eckerd	Mark Light Field • Coral Gables, FL	W 4–0	7–0
Feb 17	Barry	Mark Light Field • Coral Gables, FL	W 5–0	8–0
Feb 21	at Florida	Perry Field • Gainesville, FL	L 2–3^{7}	8–1
Feb 21	at Florida	Perry Field • Gainesville, FL	W 9–7	9–1
Feb 23	Wake Forest	Mark Light Field • Coral Gables, FL	W 10–3	10–1
Feb 24	Wake Forest	Mark Light Field • Coral Gables, FL	W 4–2	11–1
Feb 27	Texas	Mark Light Field • Coral Gables, FL	L 5–8	11–2
Feb 28	Texas	Mark Light Field • Coral Gables, FL	W 3–2	12–2

March
Date	Opponent	Site/stadium	Score	Overall record
Mar 1	St. Thomas	Mark Light Field • Coral Gables, FL	W 6–2	13–2
Mar 4	Maine	Mark Light Field • Coral Gables, FL	W 13–1	14–2
Mar 5	Maine	Mark Light Field • Coral Gables, FL	W 10–1	15–2
Mar 6	Purdue	Mark Light Field • Coral Gables, FL	W 8–7	16–2
Mar 8	Navy	Mark Light Field • Coral Gables, FL	W 9–2	17–2
Mar 10	Georgetown	Mark Light Field • Coral Gables, FL	W 8–2	18–2
Mar 11	Southern Illinois	Mark Light Field • Coral Gables, FL	W 7–6	19–2
Mar 12	Southern Illinois	Mark Light Field • Coral Gables, FL	W 6–5	20–2
Mar 13	Creighton	Mark Light Field • Coral Gables, FL	W 11–2	21–2
Mar 14	Creighton	Mark Light Field • Coral Gables, FL	W 9–4	22–2
Mar 17	St. Francis (NY)	Mark Light Field • Coral Gables, FL	W 10–5	23–2
Mar 18	Maine	Mark Light Field • Coral Gables, FL	L 3–6	23–3
Mar 20	Maine	Mark Light Field • Coral Gables, FL	W 6–5^{10}	24–3
Mar 20	Maine	Mark Light Field • Coral Gables, FL	W 3–2	25–3
Mar 22	Rutgers	Mark Light Field • Coral Gables, FL	W 4–2	26–3
Mar 23	Rutgers	Mark Light Field • Coral Gables, FL	W 8–2	27–3
Mar 24	Air Force	Mark Light Field • Coral Gables, FL	W 14–6	28–3
Mar 25	Michigan State	Mark Light Field • Coral Gables, FL	L 6–7	28–4
Mar 26	Michigan State	Mark Light Field • Coral Gables, FL	L 4–5	28–5
Mar 27	Michigan State	Mark Light Field • Coral Gables, FL	W 10–8^{10}	29–5
Mar 30	McNeese State	Mark Light Field • Coral Gables, FL	W 19–1	30–5

April
Date	Opponent	Site/stadium	Score	Overall record
Apr 1	Florida	Mark Light Field • Coral Gables, FL	W 11–3	31–5
Apr 2	Florida	Mark Light Field • Coral Gables, FL	W 5–3	32–5
Apr 5	Niagara	Mark Light Field • Coral Gables, FL	W 15–2	33–5
Apr 6	at FIU	Miami, FL	W 4–2	34–5
Apr 8	at Florida State	Dick Howser Stadium • Tallahassee, FL	W 8–3	35–5
Apr 9	at Florida State	Dick Howser Stadium • Tallahassee, FL	L 8–20	35–6
Apr 10	at Florida State	Dick Howser Stadium • Tallahassee, FL	T 5–5^{8}	35–6–1
Apr 13	Florida Atlantic	Mark Light Field • Coral Gables, FL	W 12–3	36–6–1
Apr 15	Tulane	Mark Light Field • Coral Gables, FL	W 8–2	37–6–1
Apr 16	Tulane	Mark Light Field • Coral Gables, FL	L 1–4	37–7–1
Apr 18	at South Florida	Red McEwen Field • Tampa, FL	W 11–4	38–7–1
Apr 19	at South Florida	Red McEwen Field • Tampa, FL	L 8–11	38–8–1
Apr 22	FIU	Mark Light Field • Coral Gables, FL	W 8–3	39–8–1
Apr 23	FIU	Mark Light Field • Coral Gables, FL	L 1–2	39–9–1
Apr 26	Tampa	Mark Light Field • Coral Gables, FL	W 8–5	40–9–1
Apr 29	Stanford	Mark Light Field • Coral Gables, FL	W 9–3	41–9–1
Apr 30	Stanford	Mark Light Field • Coral Gables, FL	W 7–3	42–9–1

May
Date	Opponent	Site/stadium	Score	Overall record
May 6	Florida State	Mark Light Field • Coral Gables, FL	L 5–6	42–10–1
May 7	Florida State	Mark Light Field • Coral Gables, FL	W 9–7	43–10–1
May 8	Florida State	Mark Light Field • Coral Gables, FL	L 3–6	43–11–1
May 13	at Maine	Mahaney Diamond • Orono, ME	W 8–1	44–11–1
May 14	vs Maine	The Ballpark • Old Orchard Beach, ME	W 11–3	45–11–1
May 15	vs Maine	The Ballpark • Old Orchard Beach, ME	L 5–6^{13}	45–12–1
May 16	at Maine	Mahaney Diamond • Orono, ME	W 13–5	46–12–1
May 20	Stetson	Mark Light Field • Coral Gables, FL	W 6–4	47–12–1

Postseason

NCAA Atlantic Regional
Date	Opponent	Seed	Site/stadium	Score	Overall record	NCAAT record
May 25	(6) Towson	(1)	Mark Light Field • Coral Gables, FL	W 4–0	48–12–1	1–0
May 28	(4) James Madison	(1)	Mark Light Field • Coral Gables, FL	W 18–8	49–12–1	2–0
May 28	(2) Georgia Tech	(1)	Mark Light Field • Coral Gables, FL	W 4–2	50–12–1	3–0
May 29	(3) South Carolina	(1)	Mark Light Field • Coral Gables, FL	W 10–3	51–12–1	4–0

College World Series
Date	Opponent	Seed	Site/stadium	Score	Overall record	CWS record
June 4	(6) Cal State Fullerton	(3)	Johnny Rosenblatt Stadium • Omaha, NE	L 3–9	51–13–1	0–1
June 6	(2) Fresno State	(3)	Johnny Rosenblatt Stadium • Omaha, NE	W 8–4^{12}	52–13–1	1–1
June 7	(7) Stanford	(3)	Johnny Rosenblatt Stadium • Omaha, NE	L 1–2	52–14–1	1–2
