= 1988 Wichita State Shockers baseball team =

American college baseball season

1988 Wichita State Shockers baseball

MVC champion MVC Tournament champion

College World Series
- Conference: Missouri Valley Conference
- CB: No. 4
- Record: 56–16–1 (16–4 MVC)
- Head coach: Gene Stephenson (11th season)
- Assistant coaches: Brent Kemnitz (7th season); Loren Hibbs (4th season)
- Home stadium: Lawrence–Dumont Stadium; Eck Stadium

1988 Missouri Valley Conference baseball standings
	Conf.						Overall
Team	W		L		T	PCT	W		L		T	PCT
No. 4 Wichita State ‍‍‡‍^{y}	16	–	4	–	0	.800	56	–	16	–	1	.774
Creighton ‍‍‍	12	–	8	–	0	.600	43	–	21	–	1	.669
Southern Illinois ‍‍‍	11	–	9	–	0	.550	40	–	22	–	0	.645
Bradley ‍‍‍	8	–	12	–	0	.400	34	–	25	–	0	.576
Illinois State ‍‍‍	7	–	13	–	0	.350	21	–	25	–	2	.458
Indiana State ‍‍‍	6	–	14	–	0	.300	31	–	28	–	0	.525
‡ – Tournament champion y – Invited to the NCAA tournament As of June 30, 1988; Rankings from Collegiate Baseball

The 1988 Wichita State Shockers baseball team represented Wichita State University in the 1988 NCAA Division I baseball season. The Shockers played their home games at Lawrence–Dumont Stadium and Eck Stadium in Wichita, Kansas. The team was coached by Gene Stephenson in his eleventh season as head coach at Wichita State.

The beginning of the 1988 season, the Shockers played their home games at Lawrence–Dumont Stadium while "Phase II" of the upgrade to Eck Stadium were working on renovations.

The Shockers reached the College World Series, finishing in the Semifinals to the Arizona State.

== Personnel ==
=== Roster ===
1988 Wichita State Shockers roster
Pitchers: 16 - Jeff Williams; 17 - Craig Marshall; 21 - Greg Brummett; 27 - Shane Durham; 25 - Jeff Bluma; 29 - David Haas; 31 - Steve Smith; 33 - Pat Cedeno; 34 - Jim Newlin; 35 - Morgan LeClair; 36 - Scott Martin	Infielders: 1 - Pat Meares; 2 - Mike Jones; 5 - Mike Lansing; 7 - Dan Raley; 9 - P.J. Forbes; 12 - Mark Standiford; 15 - Bryant Winslow; Catchers: 22 - Eric Wedge; 23 - Mike Wentworth	Outfielders: 3 - Jim Audley; 6 - Mike McDonald; 8 - Jeff Bonacquista; 11 - Doug Ruff; 14 - Joey Wilson; 20 - Joe Beitzinger

=== Coaches ===
1988 Wichita State Shockers baseball coaching staff
- 10 - Gene Stephenson - Head coach
- 24 - Brent Kemnitz - Pitching coach
- 32 - Loren Hibbs - Assistant coach

== Schedule ==
Legend
Wichita State win
Wichita State loss
Wichita State tie

1988 Wichita State Shockers baseball game log
Regular season (47–13)

March (16–4)
Date	Opponent	Site/stadium	Score	Overall record	MVC Record
Mar 4	at UNLV*	Roger Barnson Field • Paradise, NV	W 14–5	1–0	
Mar 5	at UNLV*	Roger Barnson Field • Paradise, NV	W 8–0	2–0	
Mar 6	at UNLV*	Roger Barnson Field • Paradise, NV	L 9–24	2–1	
Mar 11	New Mexico*	Lawrence–Dumont Stadium • Wichita, KS	L 11–13	2–2	
Mar 12	New Mexico*	Lawrence–Dumont Stadium • Wichita, KS	W 13–7	3–2	
Mar 13	New Mexico*	Lawrence–Dumont Stadium • Wichita, KS	W 11–3	4–2	
Mar 15	at Texas Tech*	Dan Law Field at Rip Griffin Park • Lubbock, TX	W 8–2	5–2	
Mar 16	at Texas Tech*	Dan Law Field at Rip Griffin Park • Lubbock, TX	L 2–6	5–3	
Mar 18	at Hardin–Simmons*	Abilene, TX	L 1–2	5–4	
Mar 18	at Hardin–Simmons*	Abilene, TX	W 2–1	6–4	
Mar 19	at Hardin–Simmons*	Abilene, TX	W 2–1	7–4	
Mar 19	at Hardin–Simmons*	Abilene, TX	W 7–2	8–4	
Mar 22	Washburn*	Lawrence–Dumont Stadium • Wichita, KS	W 16–5	9–4	
Mar 23	Washburn*	Lawrence–Dumont Stadium • Wichita, KS	W 10–6	10–4	
Mar 23	Washburn*	Lawrence–Dumont Stadium • Wichita, KS	W 10–2	11–4	
Mar 26	at Oral Roberts*	J. L. Johnson Stadium • Tulsa, OK	W 9–0	12–4	
Mar 27	at Oral Roberts*	J. L. Johnson Stadium • Tulsa, OK	W 6–5	13–4	
Mar 30	LSU*	Lawrence–Dumont Stadium • Wichita, KS	W'' 5–3	14–4	
Mar 30	LSU*	Lawrence–Dumont Stadium • Wichita, KS	W 5–3	15–4	
Mar 31	LSU*	Lawrence–Dumont Stadium • Wichita, KS	W 13–0	16–4	

April (19–8)
Date	Opponent	Site/stadium	Score	Overall record	MVC Record
Apr 4	Fort Hays State*	Eck Stadium • Wichita, KS	W 29–9	17–4	
Apr 4	Fort Hays State*	Eck Stadium • Wichita, KS	W 11–3	18–4	
Apr 5	Kansas*	Eck Stadium • Wichita, KS	W 8–0	19–4	
Apr 6	Nebraska*	Eck Stadium • Wichita, KS	W 8–3	20–4	
Apr 7	at Kansas*	Hoglund Ballpark • Lawrence, KS	L 1–10	20–5	
Apr 9	Indiana State	Bob Warn Field at Sycamore Stadium • Terre Haute, IN	L 6–7	20–6	0–1
Apr 9	at Indiana State	Bob Warn Field at Sycamore Stadium • Terre Haute, IN	L 1–5	20–7	0–2
Apr 10	at Indiana State	Bob Warn Field at Sycamore Stadium • Terre Haute, IN	W 4–2	21–7	1–2
Apr 10	at Indiana State	Bob Warn Field at Sycamore Stadium • Terre Haute, IN	W 8–0	22–7	2–2
Apr 12	Emporia State*	Eck Stadium • Wichita, KS	W 8–2	23–7	
Apr 13	Oral Roberts*	Eck Stadium • Wichita, KS	W 7–6	24–7	
Apr 14	at Kansas*	Hoglund Ballpark • Lawrence, KS	W 21–7	25–7	
Apr 16	at Illinois State	Duffy Bass Field • Normal, IL	L 5–7	25–8	2–3
Apr 16	at Illinois State	Duffy Bass Field • Normal, IL	L 1–4	25–9	2–4
Apr 17	at Illinois State	Duffy Bass Field • Normal, IL	W 8–3	26–9	3–4
Apr 17	at Illinois State	Duffy Bass Field • Normal, IL	W 10–7	27–9	4–4
Apr 20	at Oklahoma State*	Allie P. Reynolds Stadium • Stillwater, OK	L 7–8	27–10	
Apr 21	Kansas*	Eck Stadium • Wichita, KS	W 8–7	28–10	
Apr 23	Bradley	Eck Stadium • Wichita, KS	W 6–1	29–10	5–4
Apr 23	Bradley	Eck Stadium • Wichita, KS	W 3–0	30–10	6–4
Apr 24	Bradley	Eck Stadium • Wichita, KS	W 7–3	31–10	7–4
Apr 24	Bradley	Eck Stadium • Wichita, KS	W 4–3	32–10	8–4
Apr 26	Oral Roberts*	Eck Stadium • Wichita, KS	L 7–8	32–11	
Apr 27	Oklahoma State*	Eck Stadium • Wichita, KS	L 4–9	32–12	
Apr 28	Kansas State*	Eck Stadium • Wichita, KS	W 9–6	33–12	
Apr 30	Southern Illinois	Eck Stadium • Wichita, KS	W 6–3	34–12	9–4
Apr 30	Southern Illinois	Eck Stadium • Wichita, KS	W 5–4^{8}	35–12	10–4

May (12–1)
Date	Opponent	Site/stadium	Score	Overall record	MVC Record
May 1	Southern Illinois	Eck Stadium • Wichita, KS	W 7–5	36–12	11–4
May 1	Southern Illinois	Eck Stadium • Wichita, KS	W 13–7	37–12	12–4
May 2	Sterling*	Eck Stadium • Wichita, KS	W 8–0	38–12	
May 3	Missouri Valley College*	Eck Stadium • Wichita, KS	W 16–2	39–12	
May 4	at Kansas State*	Tointon Family Stadium • Manhattan, KS	L 3–9	39–13	
May 5	Emporia State*	Eck Stadium • Wichita, KS	W 10–4	40–13	
May 7	at Creighton	Creighton Sports Complex • Omaha, NE	W 7–6	41–13	13–4
May 7	at Creighton	Creighton Sports Complex • Omaha, NE	W 19–5	42–13	14–4
May 8	at Creighton	Creighton Sports Complex • Omaha, NE	W 6–4	43–13	15–4
May 8	at Creighton	Creighton Sports Complex • Omaha, NE	W 12–2	44–13	16–4
May 13	Seton Hall*	Eck Stadium • Wichita, KS	W 8–2	45–13	
May 14	Seton Hall*	Eck Stadium • Wichita, KS	W 20–13	46–13	
May 14	Seton Hall*	Eck Stadium • Wichita, KS	W 4–1	47–13	

Post-season (9–3–1)

MVC Tournament (3–0–1)
Date	Seed	Opponent	Site/stadium	Score	Overall record	Tournament Record
May 19	(1)	(6) Indiana State	Eck Stadium • Wichita, KS	W 7–5	48–13	1–0
May 20	(1)	(4) Bradley	Eck Stadium • Wichita, KS	W 6–3	49–13	2–0
May 21	(1)	(2) Creighton	Eck Stadium • Wichita, KS	W 11–5	50–13	3–0
May 22	(1)	(2) Creighton*	Eck Stadium • Wichita, KS	T 3–3^{8}	50–13–1	3–0–1

NCAA Midwest Regional (4–1)
Date	Seed	Opponent	Site/stadium	Score	Overall record	Regional Record
May 26	(2)	(5) Southwestern Louisiana	Allie P. Reynolds Stadium • Stillwater, OK	W 6–2	51–13–1	1–0
May 28	(2)	(3) Loyola Marymount	Allie P. Reynolds Stadium • Stillwater, OK	W 10–6	52–13–1	2–0
May 29	(2)	(1) Oklahoma State	Allie P. Reynolds Stadium • Stillwater, OK	W 8–5	53–13–1	3–0
May 30	(2)	(1) Oklahoma State	Allie P. Reynolds Stadium • Stillwater, OK	L 7–12	53–14–1	3–1
May 30	(2)	(1) Oklahoma State	Allie P. Reynolds Stadium • Stillwater, OK	W 15–5	54–14–1	4–1

College World Series (2–2)
Date	Seed	Opponent	Site/stadium	Score	Overall record	CWS record
Jun 3	(4)	(5) Florida	Johnny Rosenblatt Stadium • Omaha, NE	W 5–4	55–14–1	1–0
Jun 5	(4)	(1) Arizona State	Johnny Rosenblatt Stadium • Omaha, NE	W 7–4	56–14–1	2–0
Jun 8	(4)	(1) Arizona State	Johnny Rosenblatt Stadium • Omaha, NE	L 3–4^{10}	56–15–1	2–1
Jun 10	(4)	(1) Arizona State	Johnny Rosenblatt Stadium • Omaha, NE	L 1–19	56–16–1	2–2

- The Missouri Valley Conference championship game was called in the 8th inning due to rain with Wichita State being awarded the championship.

== Yearly awards ==
All-Americans First Team

- Mark Standiford - Collegiate Baseball

All-Americans Second Team

- Mark Standiford - Baseball America

Missouri Valley Conference

- MVC Pitcher of the Year - David Haas
- MVC Coach of the Year - Gene Stephenson

MVC First Team

- Second Base - Mark Standiford
- Third Base - Dan Raley
- Pitcher - David Haas

MVC All-Tournament Team

- Second Base - Mark Standiford - MVP
- Shortstop - Mike Lansing
- Catcher - Eric Wedge
- Designated Hitter - Dan Raley
- Pitcher - Pat Cedeno

College World Series All-Tournament Team

- Second Baseman - Mark Standiford
