= Doug Robbins (baseball) =

American baseball player (born 1966)

- Catcher
- Born: July 6, 1966 (age 59); Pittsburgh, Pennsylvania
- Bats: Right Throws: Right
- Stats at Baseball Reference

Doug Robbins (born July 6, 1966) is a former professional baseball catcher.

== Amateur career ==
Robbins played college baseball for Stanford University. In 1987, he played collegiate summer baseball with the Hyannis Mets of the Cape Cod Baseball League. Robbins was a member of the United States national baseball team at the 1988 Summer Olympics and 1988 Baseball World Cup. In the latter event, he hit .391/.533/.522 with 13 runs and 8 RBI in 9 games, starting ahead of Scott Servais. He was also signed by the Baltimore Orioles as a tenth round pick in the 1988 Major League Baseball draft.

== Professional career ==
Robbins began his professional career with the Class A Frederick Keys in 1989. He was elevated to Class AA, playing for the Hagerstown Suns during the 1990 and 1991 seasons. He set the Suns single season record at the AA level for on-base percentage in 1991 at 0.444. He played for the AAA Rochester Red Wings in 1992 and batted over .300. In 1993, he was traded to the Oakland Athletics and ended up playing for the Class AAA Tacoma Tigers. He was a first baseman and catcher during most of his professional career. He never made it to the major leagues due to multiple injuries to his throwing shoulder.
