= Ron Witmeyer =

American baseball player (born 1967)

- First baseman / Pinch hitter
- Born: June 28, 1967 (age 59); West Islip, New York, U.S.
- Batted: Left Threw: Left

MLB debut
- August 25, 1991, for the Oakland Athletics

Last MLB appearance
- October 2, 1991, for the Oakland Athletics

MLB statistics
- Games played: 11
- At bats: 19
- Batting average: .053
- Stats at Baseball Reference

Teams
- Oakland Athletics (1991)

Ronald Herman Witmeyer (born June 28, 1967) is an American former first baseman in Major League Baseball who played for the Oakland Athletics during their 1991 season. Listed at 6' 3", 215 lb., he batted and threw left handed.

== Amateur career ==
Born in East Islip, New York, Witmeyer attended Stanford University, and in 1987 he played collegiate summer baseball with the Harwich Mariners of the Cape Cod Baseball League.

== Professional career ==
Witmeyer was selected by the Athletics in the 7th round of the 1988 MLB draft. In 11 games, he hit one single in 19 at-bats and did not score or drive in a run.

His lone hit was a fourth-inning single off of Mark Leiter of the Detroit Tigers during a game on September 7, 1991 at Tiger Stadium.

== Coaching career ==
As of 2023, Witmeyer is a coach for the Lansing Lugnuts, an A's affiliate. He has been a minor league coach for almost two decades. Witmeyer was announced as Lansing's hitting coach for the 2026 campaign.
