= Kevin Higgins (baseball) =

American baseball player (born 1967)

- Catcher
- Born: January 22, 1967 (age 59); San Gabriel, California, U.S.
- Batted: Left Threw: Right

MLB debut
- May 29, 1993, for the San Diego Padres

Last MLB appearance
- October 3, 1993, for the San Diego Padres

MLB statistics
- Batting average: .221
- Home runs: 0
- Runs batted in: 13
- Stats at Baseball Reference

Teams
- San Diego Padres (1993)

Kevin Wayne Higgins (born January 22, 1967) is an American former professional baseball catcher who played one season in Major League Baseball (MLB) for the San Diego Padres in 1993.

== Career ==
Higgins was an outstanding collegiate infielder earning first team all America and first team all conference honors at second base for Arizona State University. Higgins had a batting average of .361 which led the number one ranked Sun Devils to the College World Series Championship game against Stanford University in 1988. He played for the San Diego Padres of Major League Baseball (MLB) in 1993. The Padres then converted Higgins to catcher when he got to the minors. After spending most of his career in the minors, he made his big league debut against the St. Louis Cardinals on May 29, 1993 going 1 for 4 with a hit and driving in 2 runs. He hit no home runs in 71 games for the Padres and only drove in thirteen runs, making his last career start on October 3, 1993. He spent the following season playing for the Padres Triple–A team. He then retired from baseball altogether after the 1994 season.
