= Lee Plemel =

Stan Holmes
- Pitcher
- Born: September 19, 1966 (age 59)
- Bats: Right Throws: Right

Career highlights and awards
- College World Series Most Outstanding Player (1988)

Lee A. Plemel (born September 19, 1966) is a former baseball pitcher. He won the 1988 College World Series Most Outstanding Player award while a senior at Stanford University. He is one of three players from Stanford University to win that award. The others are Paul Carey and John Hudgins.

He attended Laguna Hills High School before going to Stanford.

He played for the Alaska Goldpanners of the Alaska Baseball League in 1986.

== Professional career ==
Following his college career, he played professionally from 1988 to 1992, although he never made it to the big leagues. He was drafted by the St. Louis Cardinals in the fifth round of the 1988 amateur draft, and he played for three teams in his first professional career - the St. Petersburg Cardinals, the Hamilton Redbirds and the Savannah Cardinals. For St. Petersburg, he went 1–2 with a 6.97 ERA in three games started. In a single game with Hamilton, he went 1–0 with a 0.00 ERA. Finally, in five games started with Savannah, he went 1–1 with a 2.59 ERA. Overall, he went 3–3 with a 3.28 ERA that season.

In 1989, he played for two different teams - St. Petersburg again and the Springfield Cardinals. With St. Petersburg, he made 21 appearances, starting 11 of the games. He went 3–5 with a 3.46 ERA with them. In 11 games started with Springfield, he went 5–2 with a 1.78 ERA, bringing his season record to 8–7 with a 2.62 ERA.

He spent his entire 1990 season with St. Petersburg, going 3–3 with a 3.02 ERA in 10 games (nine starts). For the remaining two seasons of his career, he played for the Arkansas Travelers, being used almost exclusively as a reliever. In 1991, he appeared in 53 games, making only one start. He went 1–3 with a 3.30 ERA that season. In 1992, he made 13 relief appearances, going 1–1 with a 3.86 ERA.

== Music career ==
Plemel teamed up with fellow baseball players Jack McDowell and Wayne Edwards to form the band V.I.E.W. Plemel served as the bassist, while Edwards was the drummer and McDowell was the lead singer. The band had two albums, "Extendagenda" and "Replace The Mind." The band was formed in 1989 and disbanded in 1992.
