= Brian Johnson (catcher) =

American baseball player (born 1968)

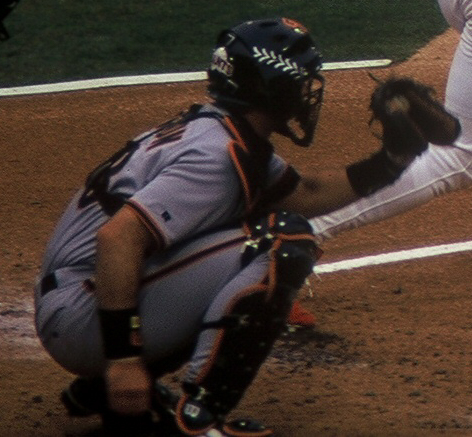
- Johnson with the San Francisco Giants
- Catcher
- Born: January 8, 1968 (age 58); Oakland, California, U.S.
- Batted: Right Threw: Right

MLB debut
- April 5, 1994, for the San Diego Padres

Last MLB appearance
- September 21, 2001, for the Los Angeles Dodgers

MLB statistics
- Batting average: .248
- Home runs: 49
- Runs batted in: 196
- Stats at Baseball Reference

Teams
- San Diego Padres (1994–1996); Detroit Tigers (1997); San Francisco Giants (1997–1998); Cincinnati Reds (1999); Kansas City Royals (2000); Los Angeles Dodgers (2001)
Medals
Men's baseball
Representing United States
World Junior Baseball Championship
| Bronze medal – third place | 1986 Windsor | Team |

Brian David Johnson (born January 8, 1968) is an American professional baseball catcher who played in Major League Baseball for the San Diego Padres, Detroit Tigers, San Francisco Giants, Cincinnati Reds, Kansas City Royals, and Los Angeles Dodgers from 1994 to 2001. Prior to his professional career he attended Stanford University and played for the Stanford Cardinal baseball and football teams.

== Early life ==
Johnson attended Skyline High School in Oakland, California, from 1983 to 1986, where he was a three-sport varsity letterman. As a catcher and pitcher for the Titans, Johnson tied one national record and broke six state records while being selected as an All-American. Johnson was the starting quarterback during all three of his years at Skyline.

In addition, he was the backup to Gary Payton on Skyline's varsity basketball team. Johnson was named the California Athlete of the Year by Cal-Hi Sports three times. Brian was also the bat boy and later played for the Oakland Horsehide softball club during the 1980s. Johnson projected to be a first-round draft pick after his senior year (1986). A week prior to the draft, he notified each team that he would not sign if drafted as he wanted to pursue his dream of playing two-Division I sports - while earning his degree on-time in four years. The Montreal Expos selected him in the 30th round of the 1986 MLB draft.

== Career at Stanford University ==
Johnson earned a full scholarship to play quarterback for Stanford University. He was the starting quarterback during parts of his first 3 seasons. Johnson also played for the Cardinal's baseball team where he played seven different positions (all but catcher and second base) helping the team win two College World Series championships.

== Major League Baseball career ==
After his junior year at Stanford, Johnson was drafted by the New York Yankees in the 16th round (413th overall) of the 1989 MLB draft to play third base. However, it seemed as though Johnson was destined to play catcher instead, a position he hadn't played since high school. He played for six different ball clubs during his career: the San Diego Padres (1994-1996), Detroit Tigers (1997), San Francisco Giants (1997-1998), Cincinnati Reds (1999), Kansas City Royals (2000) and Los Angeles Dodgers (2001). He made his Major League Baseball debut on April 4, 1994, and played his final game on September 21, 2001.

On September 18, 1997 at Candlestick Park (3Com Park at Candlestick Point), Johnson hit a home run in the bottom of the 12th inning against the Los Angeles Dodgers to move the San Francisco Giants into a tie with the Dodgers for first place. The game is known locally to Giants fans as ‘the Brian Johnson game’, and the Giants went on to win the National League West by 2 games over the Dodgers.
