= 1988 NCAA Division I baseball tournament =

- Season: 1988
- Teams: 48
- Finals site: Johnny Rosenblatt Stadium; Omaha, NE
- Champions: Stanford (2nd title)
- Runner-up: Arizona State (15th CWS Appearance)
- Winning coach: Mark Marquess (2nd title)
- MOP: Lee Plemel (Stanford)

The 1988 NCAA Division I baseball tournament was played at the end of the 1988 NCAA Division I baseball season to determine the national champion of college baseball. The tournament concluded with eight teams competing in the College World Series, a double-elimination tournament in its forty-second year. Eight regional competitions were held to determine the participants in the final event. Each region was composed of six teams, resulting in 48 teams participating in the tournament at the conclusion of their regular season, and in some cases, after a conference tournament. The forty-second tournament's champion was Stanford coached by Mark Marquess. The Most Outstanding Player was Lee Plemel of Stanford.

== Regionals ==
The opening rounds of the tournament were played across eight regional sites across the country, each consisting of a six-team field. Each regional tournament is double-elimination, however region brackets are variable depending on the number of teams remaining after each round. In 1988, for the first time, the NCAA seeded all six teams in each regional. The winners of each regional advanced to the College World Series.

Bold indicates winner.

=== Northeast Regional at New Britain, CT ===
First round
1	**Clemson**	**3**^{19}
6	Fordham	2
2	Stanford	3
5	**St. John's**	**5**
3	**Kentucky**	**6**
4	Rutgers	2

Second round
1	Clemson	1
4	**Rutgers**	**6**
6	Fordham	5
2	**Stanford**	**7**
5	St. John's	5
3	**Kentucky**	**12**
5	St. John's	1
1	**Clemson**	**11**

Third round
4	Rutgers	1
2	**Stanford**	**8**
3	**Kentucky**	**8**
1	Clemson	7

Final
2	**Stanford**	**6**	**16**
3	Kentucky	5	2

=== East Regional at Tallahassee, FL ===
First round
1	**Florida**	**7**
6	George Mason	0
2	**Florida State**	**10**
5	Stetson	3
3	NC State	0
4	**Tulane**	**1**

Second round
1	Florida	3
3	**NC State**	**13**
5	**Stetson**	2
6	George Mason	1
2	**Florida State**	8
4	Tulane	6
4	Tulane	5
1	**Florida**	**9**

Third round
3	NC State	1
5	**Stetson**	**4**
2	Florida State	3
1	**Florida**	**9**

Semifinals
5	**Stetson**	**7**
2	Florida State	2

Final
5	Stetson	0
1	**Florida**	**8**

=== Atlantic Regional at Coral Gables, FL ===
First round
1	**Miami (FL)**	**4**
6	Towson	0
2	**Georgia Tech**	**9**
5	VCU	6
3	**South Carolina**	**3**
4	James Madison	2

Second round
1	**Miami (FL)**	**18**
4	James Madison	8
2	**Georgia Tech**	**7**
3	South Carolina	6
6	**Towson**	**4**
5	VCU	2

Third round
1	**Miami (FL)**	**4**
2	Georgia Tech	2
3	**South Carolina**	**5**
5	Towson	1

Semifinals
2	Georgia Tech	0
3	**South Carolina**	5

Final
1	**Miami (FL)**	**10**	—
3	South Carolina	3	—

=== Central Regional at Austin, TX ===
First round
1	**Texas**	**7**
6	Southern	3
2	**California**	**13**
5	Penn	3
3	New Orleans	4
4	**Michigan**	**6**

Second round
1	**Texas**	**16**
3	New Orleans	10
2	**California**	**8**^{11}
4	Michigan	7
6	Southern	6
5	**Penn**	**10**

Third round
1	Texas	7
2	**California**	**8**
4	**Michigan**	**7**
5	Penn	6

Semifinals
1	**Texas**	**5**
4	Michigan	4

Final
2	**California**	**6**	—
1	Texas	5	—

=== Midwest Regional at Stillwater, OK ===
First round
1	**Oklahoma State**	**14**
6	McNeese State	4
2	**Wichita State**	**6**
5	Southwestern Louisiana	2
3	**Loyola Marymount**	**8**
4	Arkansas	3

Second round
1	**Oklahoma State**	**13**
4	Arkansas	7
2	**Wichita State**	**10**
3	Loyola Marymount	6
6	**McNeese State**	**11**
5	Southwestern Louisiana	6

Third round
1	Oklahoma State	5
2	**Wichita State**	**8**
3	**Loyola Marymount**	**12**
6	McNeese State	4

Semifinals
1	**Oklahoma State**	**8**
3	Loyola Marymount	6

Final
2	**Wichita State**	7	**15**
1	Oklahoma State	**12**	5

=== South Regional at Starkville, MS ===
First round
1	Texas A&M	0
6	**Middle Tennessee**	**3**
2	**Mississippi State**	**7**^{11}
5	Western Carolina	4
3	**Cal State Fullerton**	**6**
4	Missouri	3

Second round
6	Middle Tennessee	6
4	**Missouri**	**10**
1	**Texas A&M**	**8**
5	Western Carolina	6
2	Mississippi State	1
3	**Cal State Fullerton**	**5**
6	Middle Tennessee	4
2	**Mississippi State**	**12**

Third round
4	Missouri	2
1	**Texas A&M**	**6**
3	**Cal State Fullerton**	**5**^{12}
2	Mississippi State	3

Final
3	**Cal State Fullerton**	**6**	—
1	Texas A&M	3	—

=== West I Regional at Fresno, CA ===
First round
1	**Fresno State**	**10**^{10}
6	Minnesota	8
2	**Washington State**	**8**
5	Santa Clara	5
3	BYU	8
4	**USC**	**9**

Second round
1	**Fresno State**	**9**
3	BYU	4
2	Washington State	9
4	**USC**	**10**
6	Minnesota	3
5	**Santa Clara**	**6**

Third round
1	Fresno State	17
4	**USC**	**18**
2	**Washington State**	**6**
5	Santa Clara	5

Semifinals
1	**Fresno State**	**7**
2	Washington State	6

Final
4	USC	12	3
1	**Fresno State**	**17**	**14**

=== West II Regional at Tempe, AZ ===
First round
1	Arizona State	0
6	**Evansville**	**1**
2	Oklahoma	1
5	**Pepperdine**	**10**
3	**Central Michigan**	**10**
4	UNLV	7

Second round
6	Evansville	1
4	**UNLV**	**2**
1	**Arizona State**	**13**
2	Oklahoma	6
5	**Pepperdine**	**11**
3	Central Michigan	8
6	Evansville	6
3	**Central Michigan**	**7**

Third round
4	UNLV	8
1	**Arizona State**	**27**
5	**Pepperdine**	**5**^{14}
3	Central Michigan	4

Final
1	**Arizona State**	**11**	**10**
5	Pepperdine	4	5

== College World Series ==
After 38 seasons as a full double-elimination tournament, the format changed for 1988. Teams were split into two four-team double-elimination brackets, with the winners of each bracket meeting in a one-game championship. This format was used through 2002.

=== Participants ===
Seeding	School	Conference	Record (conference)	Head coach	CWS appearances	CWS best finish	CWS record
1	Arizona State	Pac-10	56–11 (21–9)	Jim Brock	14 (last: 1987)	1st (1965, 1967, 1969, 1977, 1981)	46–23
2	Fresno State	PCAA	56–10 (20–1)	Bob Bennett	1 (last: 1959)	3rd (1959)	3–2
3	Miami (FL)	n/a	50–12–1 (n/a)	Ron Fraser	9 (last: 1986)	1st (1982, 1985)	22–15
4	Wichita State	MVC	54–14–1 (16–4)	Gene Stephenson	1 (last: 1982)	2nd (1982)	3–2
5	Florida	SEC	47–17–1 (21–6)	Joe Arnold	0 (last: none)	none	0–0
6	Cal State Fullerton	PCAA	41–16 (12–8)	Larry Cochell	4 (last: 1984)	1st (1979, 1984)	10–6
7	Stanford	Pac-10	41–22 (18–12)	Mark Marquess	6 (last: 1987)	1st (1987)	12–11
8	California	Pac-10	40–23 (16–14)	Bob Milano	3 (last: 1980)	1st (1947, 1957)	10–2

=== Results ===
Of the 15 tournaments in which a single championship game was played, this was the only one where both teams entered the final with a loss.

==== Bracket ====
First round
1	Arizona State	4
8	California	2
4	Wichita State	5
5	Florida	4
8	California	5
5	Florida	6
7	Stanford	10
2	Fresno State	3
6	Cal State Fullerton	9
3	Miami (FL)	3
2	Fresno State	4
3	Miami (FL)	8^{12}

Second round
1	Arizona State	4
4	Wichita State	7
1	Arizona State	10
5	Florida	1
7	Stanford	3
6	Cal State Fullerton	5
7	Stanford	2
3	Miami (FL)	1

Semifinals
4	Wichita State	3	1
1	Arizona State	4^{10}	19
6	Cal State Fullerton	1	5
7	Stanford	3	9

Finals
1	Arizona State	4
7	Stanford	9

==== Game results ====
Date	Game	Winner	Score	Loser	Notes
June 3	Game 1	Arizona State	4–2	California	
June 3	Game 2	Wichita State	5–4	Florida	
June 4	Game 3	Stanford	10–3	Fresno State	
June 4	Game 4	Cal State Fullerton	9–3	Miami (FL)	
June 5	Game 5	Florida	6–5	California	California eliminated
June 5	Game 6	Wichita State	7–4	Arizona State	
June 6	Game 7	Miami (FL)	8–4 (12 innings)	Fresno State	Fresno State eliminated
June 6	Game 8	Cal State Fullerton	5–3	Stanford	
June 7	Game 9	Arizona State	10–1	Florida	Florida eliminated
June 7	Game 10	Stanford	2–1	Miami (FL)	Miami (FL) eliminated
June 8	Game 11	Arizona State	4–3 (10 innings)	Wichita State	
June 9	Game 12	Stanford	3–1	Cal State Fullerton	
June 10	Game 13	Arizona State	19–1	Wichita State	Wichita State eliminated
June 10	Game 14	Stanford	9–5	Cal State Fullerton	Cal State Fullerton eliminated
June 11	Final	Stanford	9–4	Arizona State	Stanford wins CWS

=== All-Tournament Team ===
The following players were members of the All-Tournament Team.

Position	Player	School
P	Rusty Kilgo	Arizona State
P	Lee Plemel (MOP)	Stanford
C	Doug Robbins	Stanford
1B	Ron Witmeyer	Stanford
2B	Mark Standiford	Wichita State
3B	John Finn	Arizona State
SS	Pat Listach	Arizona State
OF	Ricky Candelari	Arizona State
OF	Henrique Herman	Cal State Fullerton
OF	Dan Rumsey	Arizona State
DH	Martin Peralta	Arizona State

=== Notable players ===
- Arizona State: Kevin Higgins, Pat Listach, Blas Minor, Tim Spehr
- Cal State Fullerton: Huck Flener, Brent Mayne
- California: Jeff Kent, Darren Lewis
- Florida: Jamie McAndrew, Herb Perry
- Fresno: Tom Goodwin, Steve Hosey, Erik Schullstrom, Eddie Zosky
- Miami (FL): Joe Grahe, Kurt Knudsen, Oscar Múñoz
- Stanford: Paul Carey, Steve Chitren, Brian Johnson, Brian Keyser, Mike Mussina, Stan Spencer, Ed Sprague, Ron Witmeyer
- Wichita State: Greg Brummett, P. J. Forbes, Dave Haas, Mike Lansing, Pat Meares, Eric Wedge

== Tournament notes ==
- Arizona State sets a new tournament record scoring 27 runs in their victory over UNLV surpassing the record set by Arizona in the 1986 tournament when they scored 26 runs.

== See also ==
- 1988 NCAA Division I softball tournament
- 1988 NCAA Division II baseball tournament
- 1988 NCAA Division III baseball tournament
- 1988 NAIA World Series
