= 1988 NCAA Division I baseball rankings =

1988 NCAA Division I baseball season

Tournament

College World Series
- Champions: Stanford
- Runners-up: Arizona State
- MOP: Lee Plemel (Stanford)

Seasons
- ← 1987 1989 →

The following polls make up the 1988 NCAA Division I baseball rankings. Baseball America began publishing its poll of the top 20 teams in college baseball in 1981. Beginning with the 1985 season, it expanded to the top 25. Collegiate Baseball Newspaper published its first human poll of the top 20 teams in college baseball in 1957, and expanded to rank the top 30 teams in 1961.

== Baseball America ==
Currently, only the final poll from the 1988 season is available.

Rank	Team
1	Stanford
2	Arizona State
3	Wichita State
4	Oklahoma State
5	Fresno State
6	Cal State Fullerton
7	Florida
8	Miami (FL)
9	California
10	Texas
11	Texas A&M
12	Mississippi State
13	Loyola Marymount
14	Washington State
15	Clemson
16	Pepperdine
17	Florida State
18	Southern California
19	Kentucky
20	South Carolina
21	Santa Clara
22	UNLV
23	Georgia Tech
24	Michigan
25	Central Michigan

== Collegiate Baseball ==
Currently, only the final poll from the 1988 season is available.

Rank	Team
1	Stanford
2	Arizona State
3	Cal State Fullerton
4	Wichita State
5	Miami (FL)
6	Florida
7	Fresno State
8	California
9	Oklahoma State
10	Texas
11	Texas A&M
12	Pepperdine
13	Southern California
14	Kentucky
15	Florida State
16	Washington State
17	South Carolina
18	Loyola Marymount
19	Michigan
20	Stetson
21	Clemson
22	Central Michigan
23	Mississippi State
24	Oklahoma
25	UNLV
26	Santa Clara
27	NC State
28	Tulane
29	Georgia Tech
30	BYU
