= List of Seton Hall University people =

The following is a list of notable people associated with Seton Hall University, located in the American city of South Orange, New Jersey.

== Notable alumni ==
=== Academics ===
- Malcolm Diamond (Ed.S., 1985), professor emeritus of Religion at Princeton University
- Catherine Alicia Georges (BSN, 1965), registered nurse, professor, and nonprofit executive
- Shana O. Kelley (B.S., 1994), professor and director of Biomolecular Sciences at the University of Toronto
- Donato LaRossa (B.A., 1963), professor emeritus of Surgery at the University of Pennsylvania School of Medicine

=== Business ===
- William F. Andrews, former chairman of the Singer Corporation and the Corrections Corporation of America
- Robert E. Brennan, former First Jersey Securities CEO, convicted of securities fraud and bankruptcy fraud
- Dennis Kozlowski (BSc, 1968), former CEO of Tyco International, later convicted of securities fraud
- George Kurtz (born c. 1970), co-founder and CEO of cybersecurity company CrowdStrike; founder of Foundstone and chief technology officer of McAfee
- Orin R. Smith (M.B.A., 1964), former chairman and CEO of Engelhard Corporation

=== Government and politics ===
- Harold A. Ackerman (B.A.), federal judge for the United States District Court for the District of New Jersey
- John O. Bennett (J.D., 1974), former New Jersey state senator and acting governor
- Michael Chagares (J.D., 1987), federal judge on the United States Court of Appeals
- Raymond G. Chambers (M.B.A., 1968), currently serves as United Nations secretary-general's special envoy for malaria
- Chris Christie (J.D., 1987), former governor of New Jersey, United States attorney for the District of New Jersey
- Jack Ciattarelli (B.S. and M.B.A.), Republican nominee in the 2021 New Jersey gubernatorial election
- Clay Constantinou, former United States ambassador to Luxembourg
- Marion Crecco, member of the New Jersey General Assembly 1986–2002
- Michellene Davis (B.A. 1994), former New Jersey State Treasurer 2007–2008; first African American to hold this office
- William Howe Davis (1904–1982), politician who served as mayor of Orange, New Jersey for 12 years and as the director of the New Jersey Division of Alcoholic Beverage Control during the administration of Governor Robert B. Meyner
- Lucille Davy (BSc), New Jersey commissioner of Education
- Patrick J. Diegnan, representative and parliamentarian of the New Jersey General Assembly
- Donald DiFrancesco (J.D., 1969), former governor of New Jersey
- Bill Field, member of the New Hampshire House of Representatives
- Arline Friscia (B.A.), member of the New Jersey General Assembly
- Thomas W. Greelish (J.D., 1971), United States attorney for the District of New Jersey 1985–1987
- Mims Hackett (M.S.), New Jersey General Assembly
- Jerramiah Healy (J.D., 1975), mayor of Jersey City, New Jersey
- Anthony Impreveduto (M.A.), served in the New Jersey General Assembly 1987–2004
- LeRoy J. Jones, Jr. (B.S.), member of the New Jersey General Assembly
- Liu He, former vice premier of the People's Republic of China and former director of the Central Financial and Economic Affairs Commission Office
- Mary Madison (MEd), member of the Iowa House of Representatives
- Nicole Malliotakis (B.S. 2001), U.S. congresswoman from New York
- Thomas F. McCran (B.S., 1896), New Jersey attorney general 1919–1924
- Cornelius Augustine McGlennon (B.A., 1899), represented New Jersey's 8th congressional district 1919–1921; mayor of East Newark 1907–1919
- LaMonica McIver (M.A. 2011), U.S. congresswoman from New Jersey
- John F. McKeon (J.D., 1983), New Jersey General Assembly
- Mike Pappas (B.A., 1982), U.S. congressman from New Jersey
- Donald M. Payne (B.A., 1957), U.S. congressman from New Jersey
- Eugene A. Philbin (M.A., LL.D, 1884), Manhattan district attorney and New York Supreme Court justice
- Anthony Principi (J.D., 1975), 4th United States Secretary of Veterans Affairs
- Matthew John Rinaldo (M.B.A., 1959), United States House of Representatives for twenty years, in New Jersey's 12th and 7th congressional districts
- Richie Roberts (J.D., 1970), detective and attorney responsible for the arrest and prosecution of Frank Lucas, as portrayed in the film American Gangster by Russell Crowe
- Louis Romano, member of the New Jersey General Assembly
- Thomas J. Scully (B.A., 1889), New Jersey's 3rd congressional district 1911–21; mayor of South Amboy, 1909–10, 1921
- Ellen Tauscher (BSc, 1974), undersecretary of State for Arms Control and International Security, former U.S. congresswoman from California
- George J. Terwilliger III (B.A., 1973), U.S. deputy attorney general 1991–93
- John P. Washington, U.S. Army chaplain and Chaplain's Medal for Heroism recipient
- Maj. Charles Watters, U.S. Army chaplain and Medal of Honor recipient
- John Wisniewski (J.D., 1987), former chair of the New Jersey Democratic State Committee 2011–2013, former member of the New Jersey General Assembly 1996–2018

=== Culture ===
==== Media ====
- Jim Chern (M.Th., 1999), Catholic priest and co-host of The Catholic Guy Show on Sirius XM Satellite Radio
- Lisa Durden, media commentator
- John Fanta, college basketball broadcaster
- Donna Fiducia, Fox News anchor
- Bob Ley, ESPN sports anchor
- Ed Lucas (B.A., Communication, 1962), Emmy-winning blind Yankee broadcaster, YES Network
- Megan Olivi, sports broadcaster
- Bob Picozzi, sportscaster, ESPN Radio's Mike and Mike show
- Vinnie Politan (J.D.), Court TV anchor
- Bill Raftery (M.S.), CBS and ESPN college basketball analyst; inducted into Seton Hall's Hall of Fame in 1984
- Noah Rothman (M.A., Diplomacy and International Relations, 2010), writer, author, editor, MSNBC commentator, senior writer for National Review
- Pete Tauriello (B.A.), WINS traffic reporter
- Dick Vitale (BSc, 1963), ESPN sports anchor
- Bernie Wagenblast (B.A., Communications, 1978), WINS traffic reporter, "voice" of the New York City Subway System
- Robert J. Wussler (B.A., 1957), co-founder of CNN
- Francesca Regalado (B.S., 2017) The New York Times reporter

==== Music ====
- Greg Garbowsky (dropped out), bass guitar player for the Jonas Brothers
- Naturi Naughton, actress, singer, and former member of 3LW
- Max Weinberg, drummer for Bruce Springsteen's E Street Band and bandleader of The Max Weinberg 7 on Late Night with Conan O'Brien
- Jimmy White, pop and adult contemporary artist

==== TV and film ====
- Daniel Acon (1981), Emmy Award-nominated special effects artist
- Ron Carey (B.A., 1956), actor
- Joe Louis Clark, former high school principal, and character in the 1989 film Lean on Me played by Morgan Freeman
- Chuck Connors, TV's "Rifleman", basketball player (Boston Celtics) and baseball player (Cubs and Dodgers)
- Robert Desiderio, actor and narrator
- Crystal Dickinson (1998), actress with credits in film, television, and in theater, and made her Broadway debut in Clybourne Park
- Dulé Hill, actor
- Jim Hunter, MLB Baltimore Orioles TV and radio broadcaster
- Victor J. Kemper, cinematographer
- Josephine Siao, Hong Kong actress
- Bill Timoney (B.A., 1980), actor (All My Children, 12 Monkeys) and voice actor (Pokémon)
- E. Duke Vincent (1954), TV producer
- Raoul Walsh (B.A., 1908), film director and founding member of the Academy of Motion Picture Arts and Sciences

==== Literature ====
- Niobia Bryant (B.A., 1996 and B.S.N., 1997), bestselling author (also writes as Meesha Mink)
- X. J. Kennedy (B.A., 1950), poet, author, editor and translator

==== Art ====
- Denis Masi (B.A., 1964), artist

=== Science and technology ===
- John J. Mooney (B.S., 1955), co-inventor of the three-way catalytic converter and co-winner of National Medal of Technology

=== Sports ===
- Lou Duva, International Boxing Hall of Fame trainer
- Peter J. Economou (PhD, 2011), sport and clinical psychologist; associate professor of applied psychology at Rutgers University and director of its Behavioral Health & Sport Psychology unit; inducted into Seton Hall's Hall of Fame in 2023
- Louis Gaudinot (Criminal Justice), professional mixed martial artist; The Ultimate Fighter: Team Bisping vs. Team Miller competitor; current UFC Flyweight
- Andy Stanfield (B.A., 1952), two-time gold medalist sprinter

==== Baseball ====
- Craig Biggio, former Major League Baseball player for the Houston Astros and member of the Baseball Hall of Fame; inducted into Seton Hall's Hall of Fame in 1996
- Ed Blankmeyer, college baseball coach at St. John's; inducted into Seton Hall's Hall of Fame in 1986
- Johnny Briggs, former Major League Baseball player, 1964–1975, for the Philadelphia Phillies, Milwaukee Brewers, and Minnesota Twins
- Frank Bruggy, former Major League Baseball player, 1921–1925, for the Philadelphia Phillies, Philadelphia Athletics, and Cincinnati Reds
- Rick Cerone, former Major League Baseball player, 1975–1992, for the Cleveland Indians, Toronto Blue Jays, New York Yankees, Atlanta Braves, Milwaukee Brewers, Boston Red Sox, New York Mets, and Montreal Expos
- Chuck Connors, former Major League Baseball player, 1949–1951, with the Brooklyn Dodgers and Chicago Cubs
- Danny Coombs, former Major League Baseball player, 1963–1971, for the Houston Astros and San Diego Padres
- Jack Ferry, former Major League Baseball player, 1910–1913, for the Pittsburgh Pirates
- Hank Fischer, former Major League Baseball player, 1962–1967, for the Milwaukee Braves, Cincinnati Reds, and Boston Red Sox
- Jason Grilli, formerMajor League Baseball player for the Atlanta Braves
- Bill Henry, former Major League Baseball player in 1966 for the New York Yankees
- Gene Hermanski, retired Major League Baseball outfielder, 1943–1953, with the Brooklyn Dodgers, Chicago Cubs, and Pittsburgh Pirates
- Kevin Leighton, college baseball coach at Manhattan and Fordham
- Ted Lepcio, former Major League Baseball player, 1952–1961, for the Boston Red Sox, Detroit Tigers, Philadelphia Phillies, Chicago White Sox, and Minnesota Twins; inducted into Seton Hall's Hall of Fame in 1973
- Ed Madjeski, former Major League Baseball player, 1932–1937, for the Philadelphia Athletics, Chicago White Sox, and New York Giants; inducted into Seton Hall's Hall of Fame in 1977
- Mike Moriarty, former Major League Baseball player in 2002 for the Baltimore Orioles
- Dan Morogiello, former Major League Baseball player in 1983 for the Baltimore Orioles
- John Morris, former Major League Baseball, 1986–1992, for the St. Louis Cardinals, Philadelphia Phillies, and California Angels; inducted into Seton Hall's Hall of Fame in 1989
- Matt Morris, former Major League Baseball player; inducted into Seton Hall's Hall of Fame in 2004
- Kevin Morton, former Major League Baseball player in 1991 for the Boston Red Sox
- Steve Nagy, former Major League Baseball player, 1947–1950, with the Pittsburgh Pirates and Washington Senators
- Pat Pacillo, former Major League Baseball player; inducted into Seton Hall's Hall of Fame in 1991
- Pepper Peploski, former Major League Baseball player in 1913 for the Detroit Tigers
- Charlie Puleo, former Major League Baseball player
- Otto Rettig, former Major League Baseball player in 1922 for the Philadelphia Athletics
- Rich Scheid, former Major League Baseball player, 1992–1995, for the Houston Astros and Florida Marlins
- Anthony Seratelli
- Joe Shannon, former Major League Baseball player in 1915 for the Boston Braves
- Red Shannon, former Major League Baseball player, 1915–1926, for the Boston Braves, Philadelphia Athletics, Boston Red Sox, Washington Senators, and Chicago Cubs
- Mike Sheppard, former Seton Hall baseball coach
- Rob Sheppard, Seton Hall baseball coach
- John Valentin, retired Major League Baseball player
- Mo Vaughn, retired Major League Baseball first baseman and designated hitter

==== Basketball ====
- Anthony Avent, former NBA player
- Andre Barrett, former NBA player; inducted into Seton Hall's Hall of Fame in 2013
- Khadeen Carrington (born 1995), Israeli-Trinidadian-American basketball player for Hapoel Jerusalem of the Israeli Basketball Premier League
- Chuck Connors, former NBA player
- Samuel Dalembert, Haitian-Canadian former NBA player
- Bob Davies, former NBA player; inducted into Seton Hall's Hall of Fame in 1973
- Terry Dehere, former NBA player; inducted into Seton Hall's Hall of Fame in 2002
- Walter Dukes, former NBA player; inducted into Seton Hall's Hall of Fame in 1973
- Dick Fitzgerald, former NBA player
- Nikos Galis, Greek former professional basketball player, Eurobasket 1987 Gold Medalist, FIBA's 50 Greatest Players (inaugural member, 1991)
- Paul Gause, former defensive specialist on Seton Hall's team
- Andrew Gaze, former Australian basketball player
- Romaro Gill, Jamaican current NBA G League player
- Adrian Griffin, former NBA player; inducted into Seton Hall's Hall of Fame in 1996
- Eddie Griffin, former NBA player
- Shaheen Holloway, former Pirates player and current Pirates men's head coach
- Dan Hurley, two-time NCAA men's basketball champion as head coach of the UConn Huskies men's basketball program
- Howie Janotta, former NBA player
- Artūras Karnišovas, Lithuanian former professional basketball player in Europe, two-time Olympic bronze medalist, current executive vice president of basketball operations for the Chicago Bulls
- Rimantas Kaukėnas, Lithuanian former professional basketball player in Europe
- Tom Maayan (born 1993), Israeli basketball player in the Israeli National League
- Johnny Macknowski, former NBA player; inducted into Seton Hall's Hall of Fame in 1975
- Sandro Mamukelashvili, currently under contract with the San Antonio Spurs
- Mike McCarron, former NBA player
- Quincy McKnight, former NBA G League player
- Harry Miller, former NBA player
- John Morton, former NBA player
- Glenn Mosley, former NBA player; inducted into Seton Hall's Hall of Fame in 1984
- KC Ndefo, current Pirates player most notable as a key figure in Saint Peter's 2022 NCAA tournament run
- Al Negratti, former NBA player
- Myles Powell, currently under contract with the New York Knicks
- Ramon Ramos, Puerto Rican former NBA player; inducted into Seton Hall's Hall of Fame in 1973
- Richie Regan, former NBA player; inducted into Seton Hall's Hall of Fame in 1973
- Ed Sadowski, former NBA player; inducted into Seton Hall's Hall of Fame in 1974
- Pep Saul, former NBA player
- Ben Scharnus, former NBA player
- Bobby Wanzer, former NBA player
- Nick Werkman, the NCAA's national scoring leader in 1962–63
- Isaiah Whitehead (born 1995), basketball player for the Brooklyn Nets (NBA), now in the Israeli Basketball Premier League
- Luther Wright, former NBA player

==== Soccer ====
- Jason Hernandez, former professional Major League Soccer player for New York City F.C.
- Ian Joyce, former Football League One player for Southend United
- Gordon Kljestan, retired USSF player for FC Tampa Bay
- Sacha Kljestan, retired professional soccer player; played for several teams in Major League Soccer, and the US Men's National Team
- Eoin Monaghan, former Shamrock Rovers player
- Kelly Smith, former player for the England women's national football team

==== Track and field ====
- Johnny Gibson, former coach, nationally renowned intermediate hurdler
- Andy Stanfield, Olympic medalist
- Andrew Valmon, Olympic gold medalist world record holder

==== Wrestling ====
- Charlie Haas, two-time Big East Wrestling Champion

==== Other sports ====
- Bart Oates (J.D.), football player, three-time Super Bowl champion and president of the New Jersey Hall of Fame

== Notable faculty ==
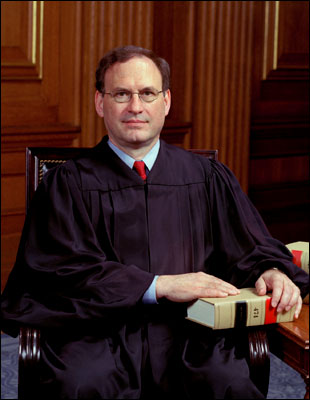
Former Prof. Samuel Alito

- Samuel Alito, current United States Supreme Court justice
- Patrick Clawson, director of the Washington Institute for Near East Policy
- Clay Constantinou, U.S. ambassador to Luxembourg and former dean of the Whitehead School of Diplomacy
- John DeFrancis, linguist, sinologist, author of Chinese language textbooks, lexicographer of Chinese dictionaries
- Will Durant, Pulitzer Prize-winning author and Presidential Medal of Freedom recipient
- Chas Fox, NFL player
- Orlando Greene, Olympic runner
- Patrick E. Hobbs, former dean of Seton Hall Law School
- Stanley Jaki, philosopher of science and Templeton Prize recipient
- James F. Kelley, president of Seton Hall 1933–1949; at the time of his appointment, he was the youngest college president in the United States
- Leonard Marshall, New York Giants football player; Stillman School of business executive
- Andrew Napolitano, former judge and current correspondent for Fox News Channel
- Katia Passerini, interim president of Seton Hall University
- Boniface Ramsey, Catholic priest who raised concerns about the behaviour of Cardinal Theodore McCarrick
- Rob Redding, talk show host, journalist, author and visual artist
- Peter W. Rodino, former chairman of House Judiciary Committee and chair of impeachment hearings for President Richard Nixon
- Eliakim P. Scammon, brigadier general during the American Civil War
- Sister Rose Thering, missionary whose life's work was documented in an Academy Award-nominated film, Sister Rose's Passion
- John B. Tsu, Chinese-American professor of Asian studies and advocate for Asian-Americans
- Cody Willard, investor and television anchor
