= List of Boston Red Sox first-round draft picks =

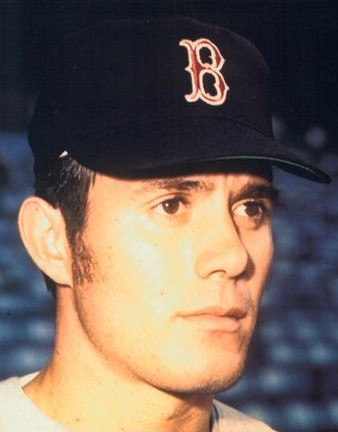
Billy Conigliaro was the first player ever drafted by the Boston Red Sox, selected in the first round of the 1965 MLB draft. An outfielder, he played in MLB from 1969 through 1973.

The Boston Red Sox are a Major League Baseball (MLB) franchise based in Boston, Massachusetts. They play in the American League East division. This page lists prospects selected by the team in the first round of the annual Major League Baseball draft.

Officially known as the "First-Year Player Draft", the draft is MLB's primary mechanism for assigning amateur baseball players from high schools, colleges, and other amateur baseball clubs to its teams. The draft order is determined based on the previous season's standings, with the team possessing the worst record receiving the first pick. In addition, teams that lost free agents in the previous off-season may be awarded compensatory or supplementary picks.

== History ==
Since the institution of the MLB draft in 1965, the Red Sox have selected 79 players in the first round, through the 2025 MLB draft. Some of the selections have been compensatory or supplementary picks. These additional picks are provided when a team loses a particularly valuable free agent in the prior off-season,^{[V]} or, more recently, if a team fails to sign a draft pick from the previous year.

The primary position of each player drafted by the Red Sox in the first round, at the time they were selected, has been as follows:

Position	Number	Most recent (year)
Pitcher	37	Kyson Witherspoon (2025)
Outfielder	21	Braden Montgomery (2024)
Shortstop	13	Jake Schaffner (2026)
Catcher	5	Kyle Teel (2023)
First baseman	4	Mo Vaughn (1989)
Second baseman	3	Nick Yorke (2020)
Third baseman	2	Triston Casas (2018)

Of the 36 pitchers selected, 12 have been left-handed and 24 have been right-handed.

There have been 13 players selected from high schools or universities in the state of California, while nine came from Texas schools and six came from South Carolina schools. The Red Sox have also drafted two players in the first round from outside the United States: Chris Reitsma (1996) from Canada, and Reymond Fuentes (2009) from Puerto Rico.

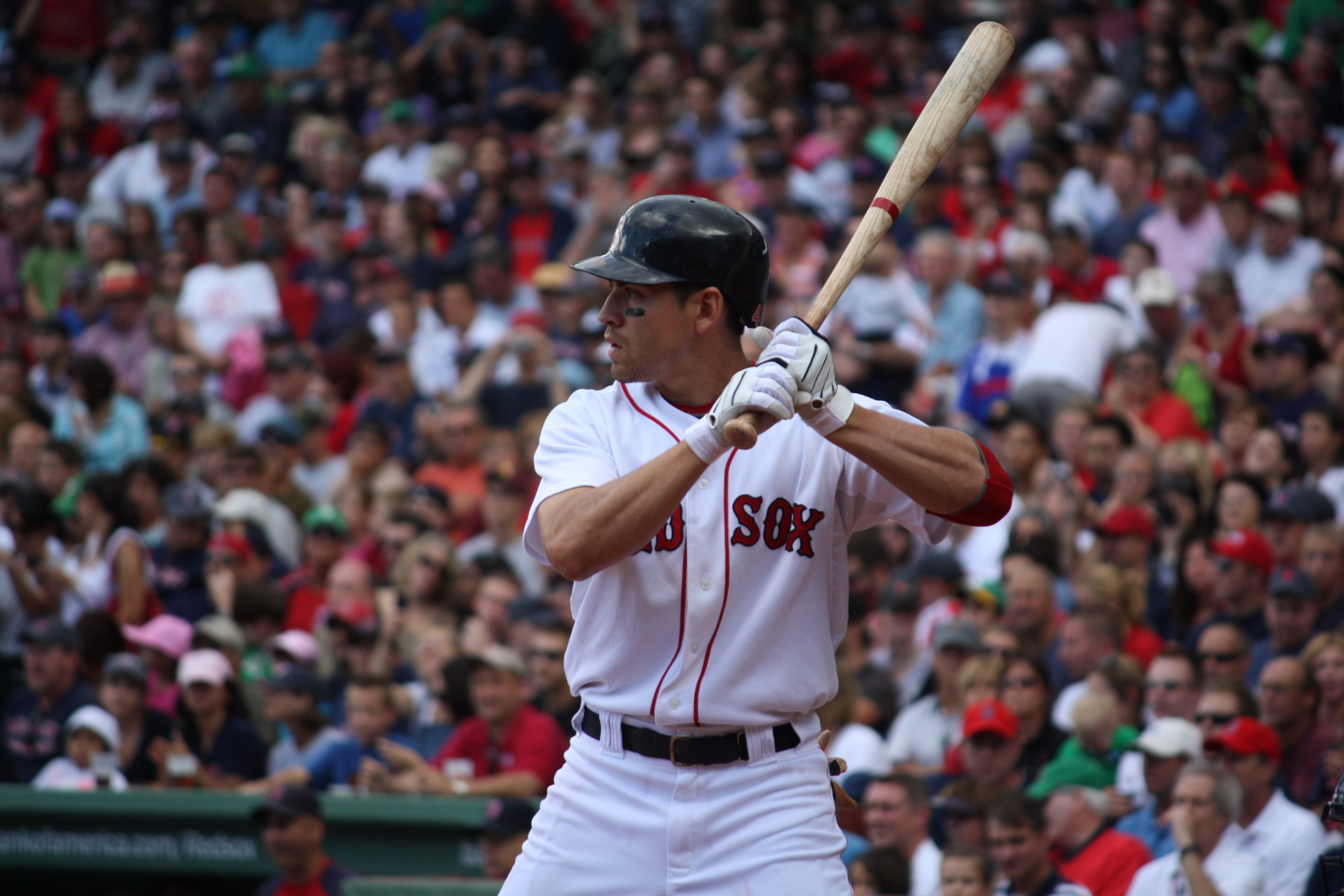
Jacoby Ellsbury (2005 draft) won championships with the Red Sox in 2007 and 2013, and joined the 30–30 club in 2011.

Several of the team's first-round selections have gone on to win notable awards. Nomar Garciaparra (1994 draft) won the Rookie of the Year Award with the Red Sox in 1997. Jim Rice (1971), Roger Clemens (1983), and Mo Vaughn (1989) each won a Most Valuable Player Award with the team. Clemens also won three Cy Young Awards with the Red Sox and another four with other teams for a total of seven, more than any other pitcher in MLB history. Clay Buchholz (2005) threw a no-hitter, the 17th in Red Sox franchise history, in his second major league start, tying him with Wilson Álvarez for the second-fastest no-hitter by an MLB pitcher. Jim Rice is the only first-round pick of the Red Sox in the Baseball Hall of Fame, having been elected to the Hall during 2009 balloting.

Seven of the team's first-round selections have gone on to win a World Series with the Red Sox: Trot Nixon (1993 draft) was a member of the 2004 championship team; Jacoby Ellsbury (2005) was a member of the 2007 team; Ellsbury and Clay Buchholz (2005) were members of the 2013 team; and Matt Barnes (2011), Blake Swihart (2011), Jackie Bradley Jr. (2011), and Andrew Benintendi (2015) were members of the 2018 team.

The Red Sox have never made the first overall selection in the draft. The earliest selection the team has had was the third pick; this occurred in 1967, when the team selected Mike Garman, a pitcher who went on to compile a career record of 22–27 while playing for five different MLB teams between 1969 and 1978. The team has signed all but two of their first-round picks across their draft history: Jimmy Hacker did not sign following the 1970 draft, and Greg McMurtry did not sign following the 1986 draft. To date, the only Red Sox first-round draft pick to make his MLB debut the same year that he was drafted was Craig Hansen, in 2005.

Three of the team's first-round selections went on to play in the National Football League (NFL) rather than in MLB: Noel Jenke (1969 draft; NFL 1971–1974), Greg McMurtry (1986 draft; NFL 1990–1994), and Corey Jenkins (1995 draft; NFL 2003–2004).

== Key ==
Year	Each year links to an article about that year's MLB draft.
Pos.	Position at which the player was drafted.
School	College or high school the player last competed for at the time drafted. Sorts by U.S. state or Canadian province name.
Pick	Overall number of the pick in the draft.
MLB	Year(s) that the player appeared in MLB, if any. Italics indicate debut (or final game) was not with the Red Sox.
*	Player did not sign with the Red Sox
§	Indicates a supplemental pick
†	Member of the National Baseball Hall of Fame
'04	Player was a member of Boston's 2004 World Series championship team
'07	Player was a member of Boston's 2007 World Series championship team
'13	Player was a member of Boston's 2013 World Series championship team
'18	Player was a member of Boston's 2018 World Series championship team

Note: a year in parentheses, such as ('04), indicates the player was a member of that season's championship team but was not on the World Series roster.

== Picks ==
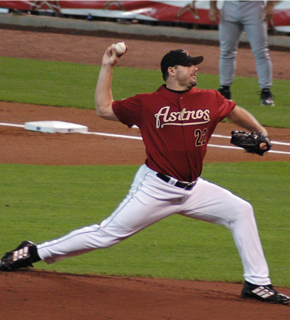
Roger Clemens (1983) won three Cy Young Awards and an MVP Award with the Red Sox along with another four Cy Young Awards with other teams.

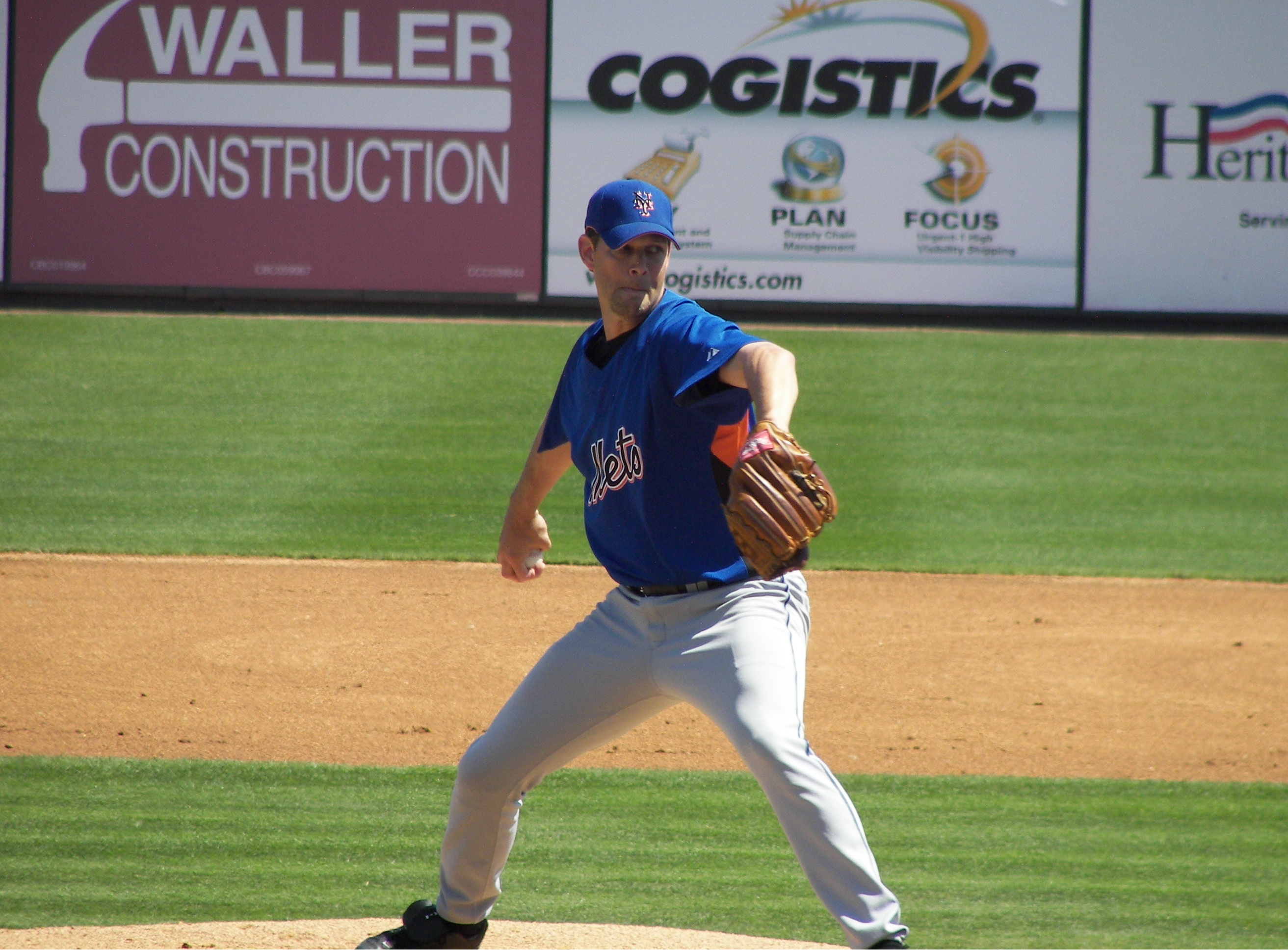
Aaron Sele (1991) was the first of two players drafted from Washington State University in 1991.

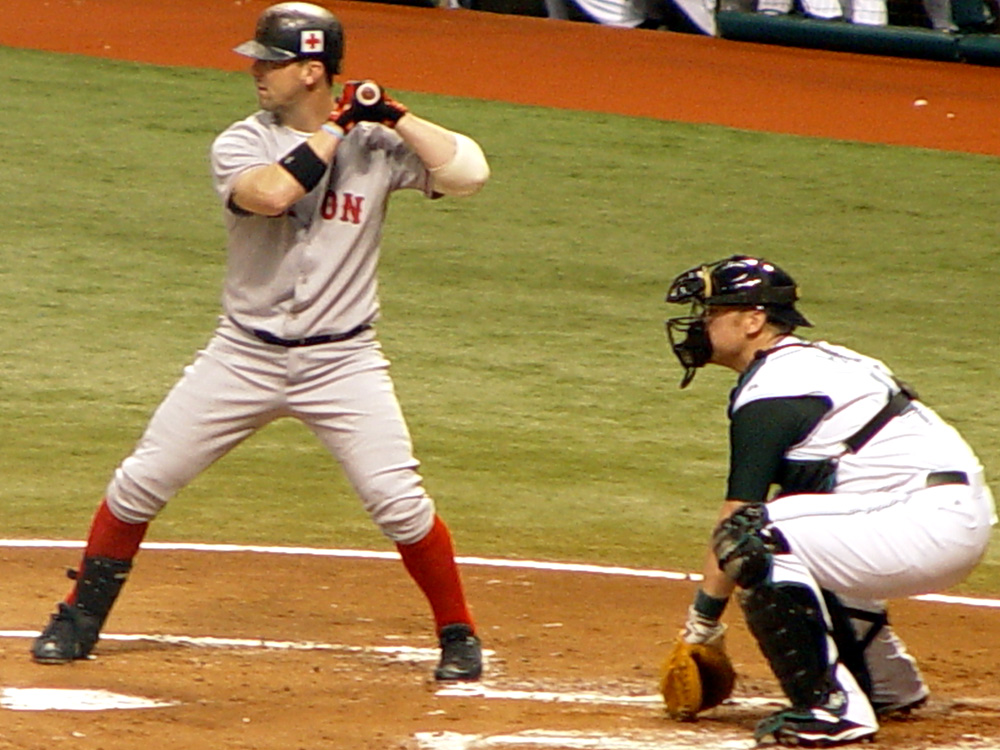
Trot Nixon (1993) won a World Series championship with the 2004 Red Sox.

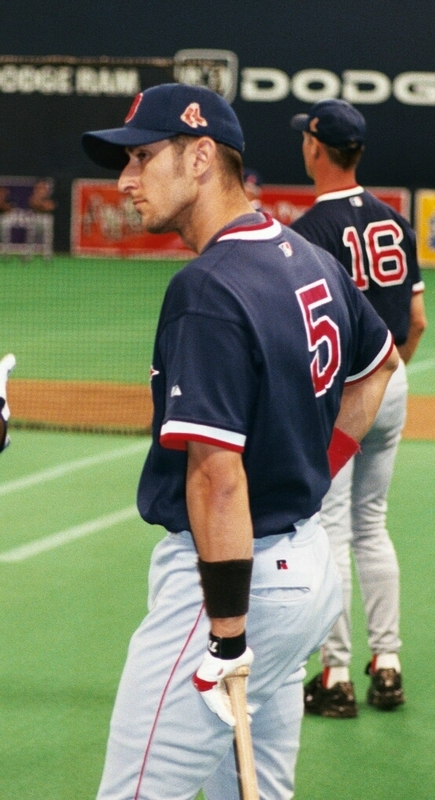
Nomar Garciaparra (1994) won the Rookie of the Year Award in 1997.

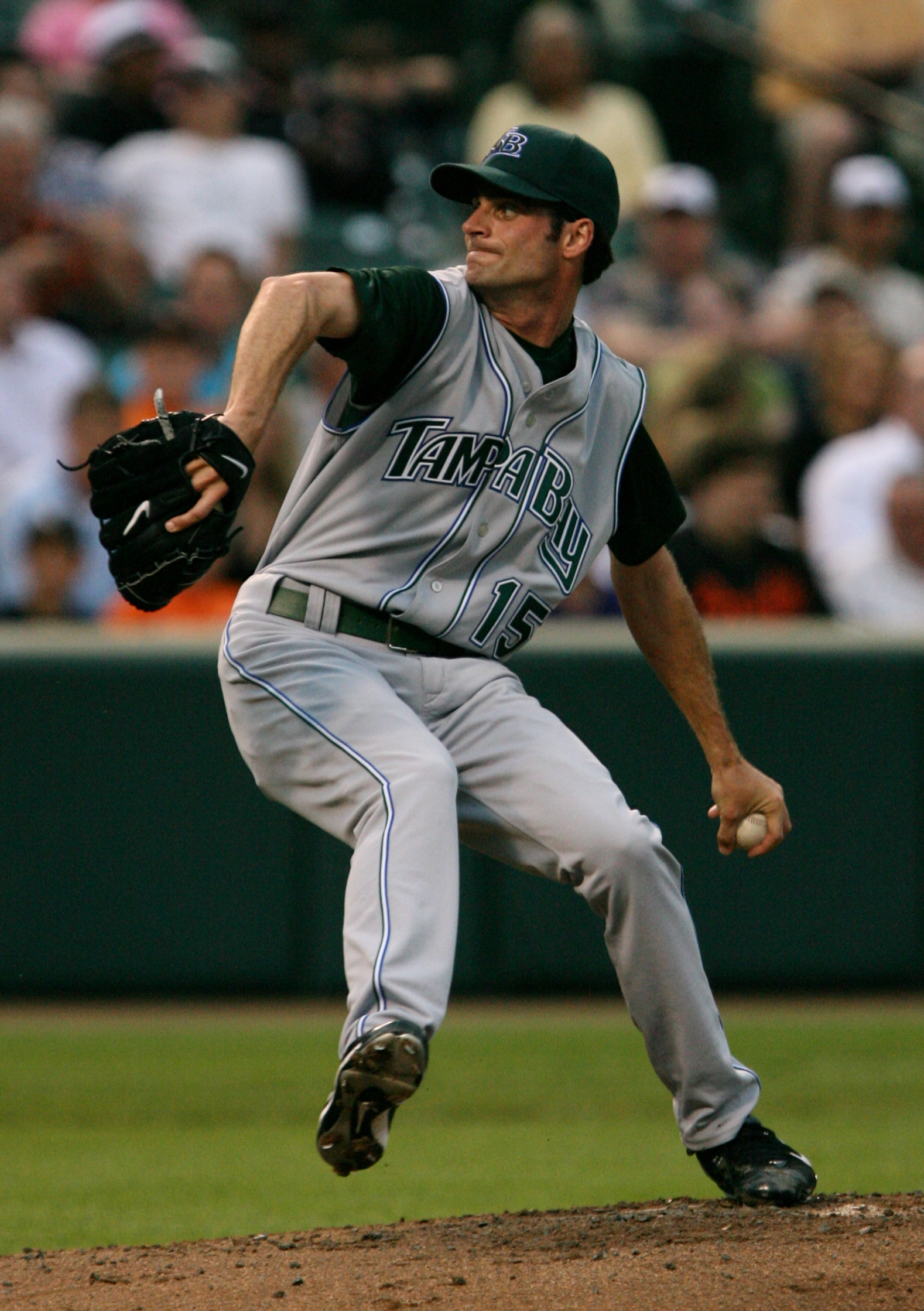
Casey Fossum (1999) played in MLB from 2001 through 2009.

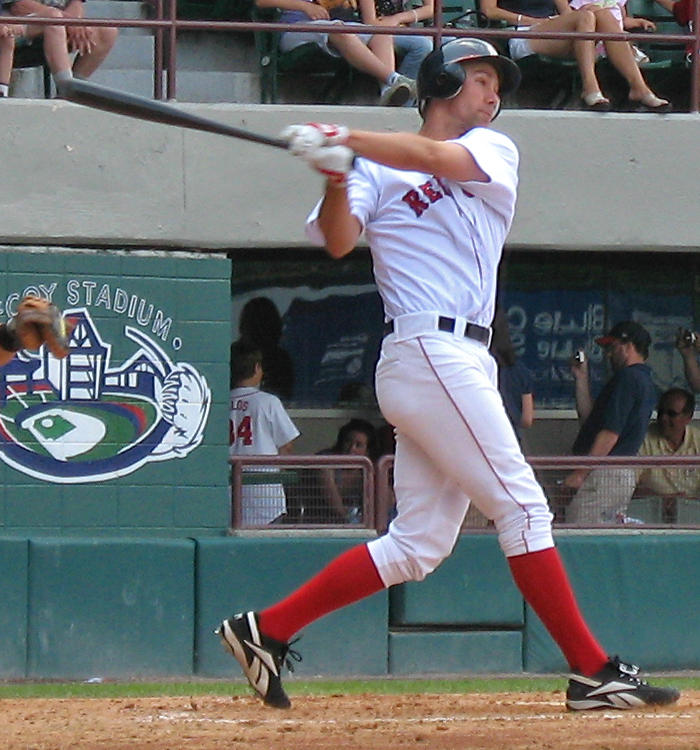
David Murphy (2003) played in MLB from 2006 through 2015.

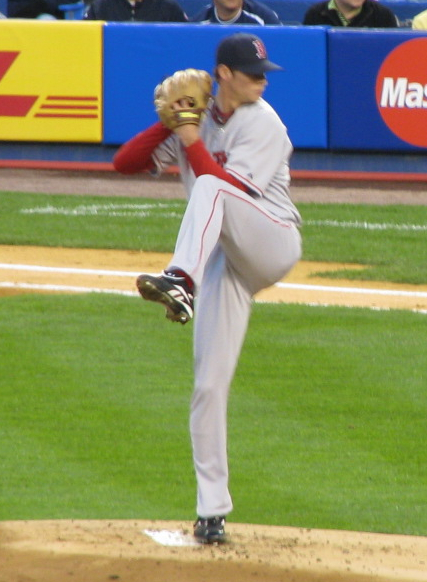
Clay Buchholz (2005) threw a no-hitter in his second start with the Red Sox.

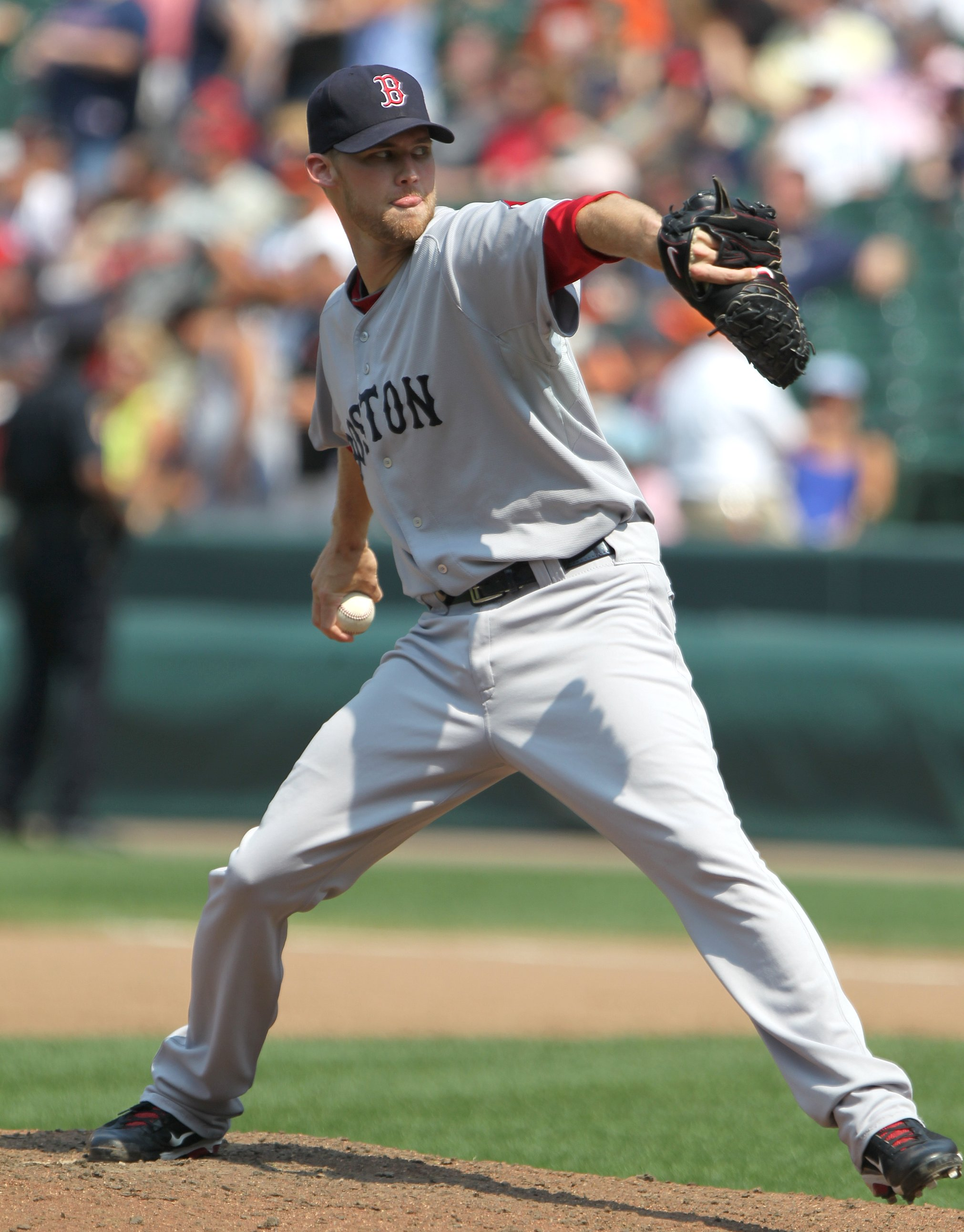
Daniel Bard (2006) played in MLB from 2009 through 2013.

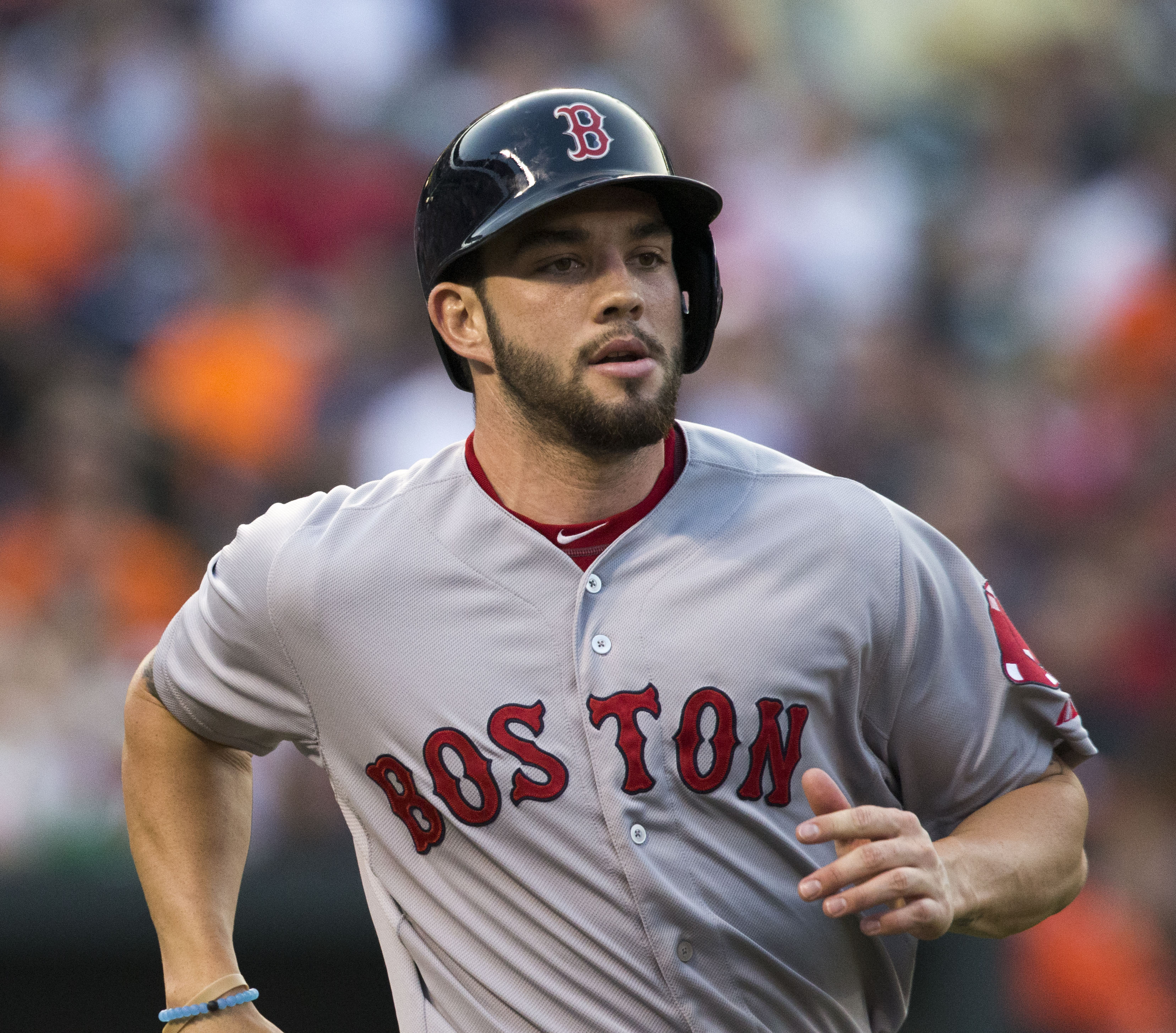
Blake Swihart (2011) was a member of Boston's 2018 championship team.

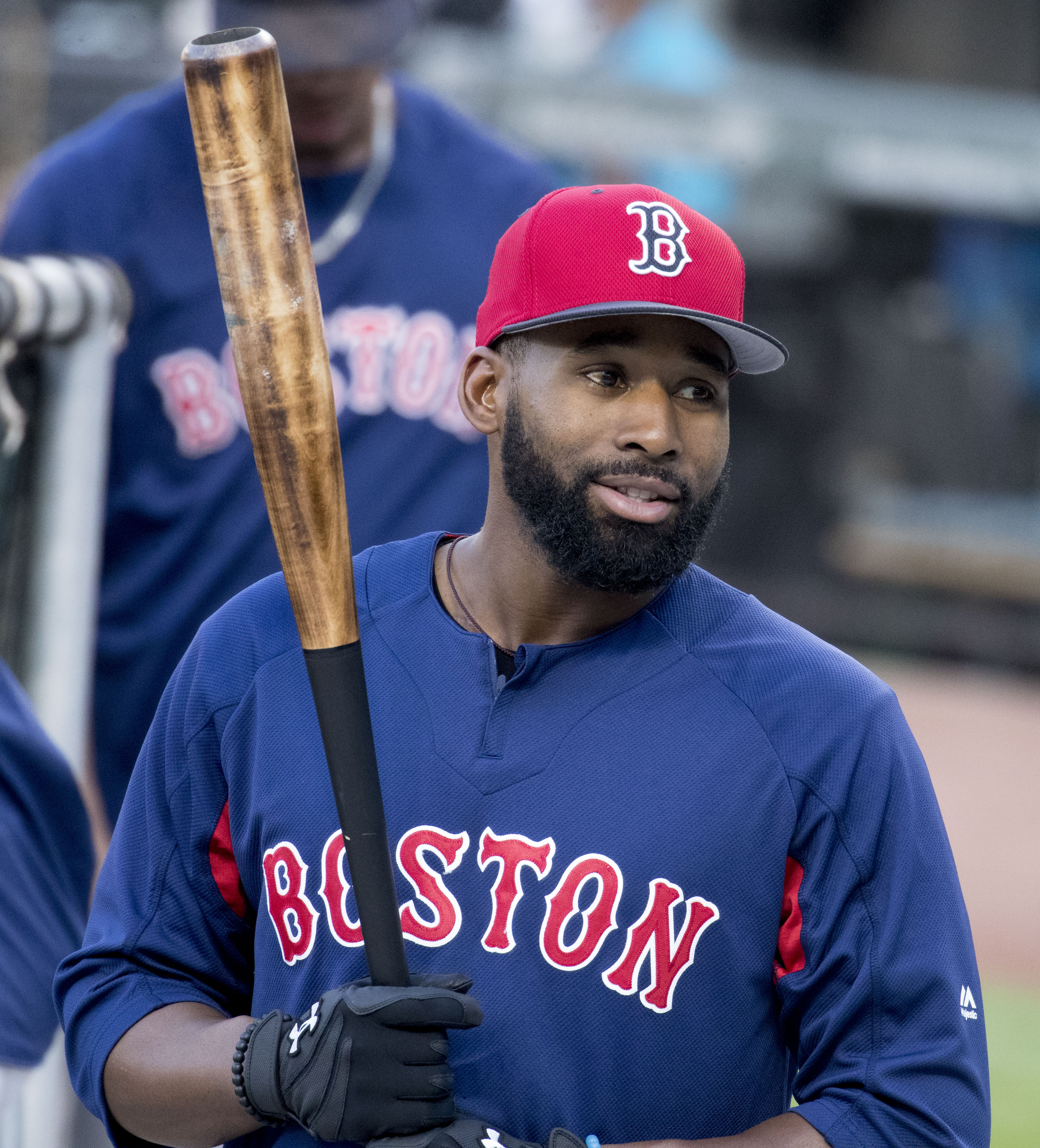
Jackie Bradley Jr. (2011) was a member of Boston's 2018 championship team.

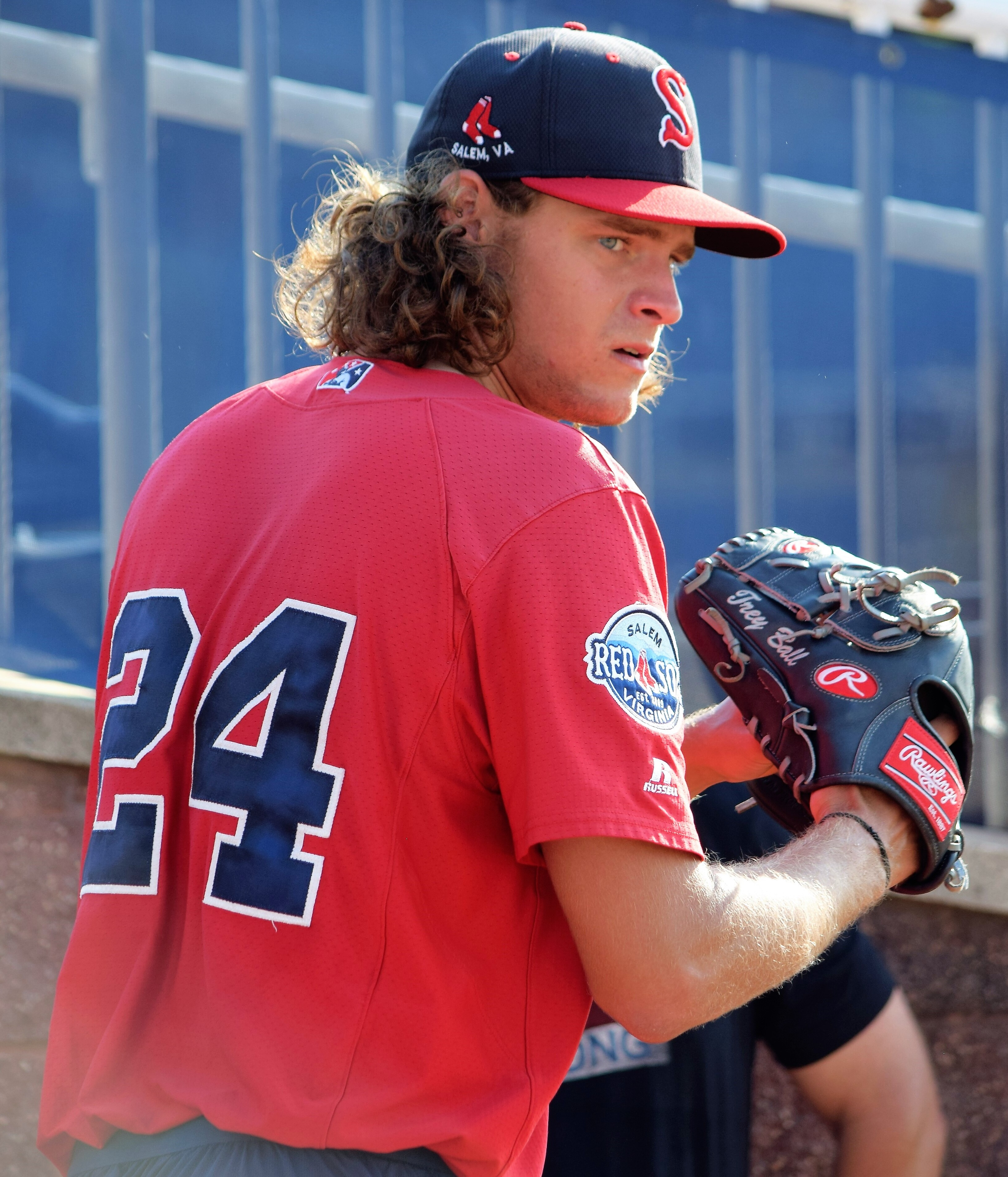
Trey Ball (2013) never reached the major leagues.

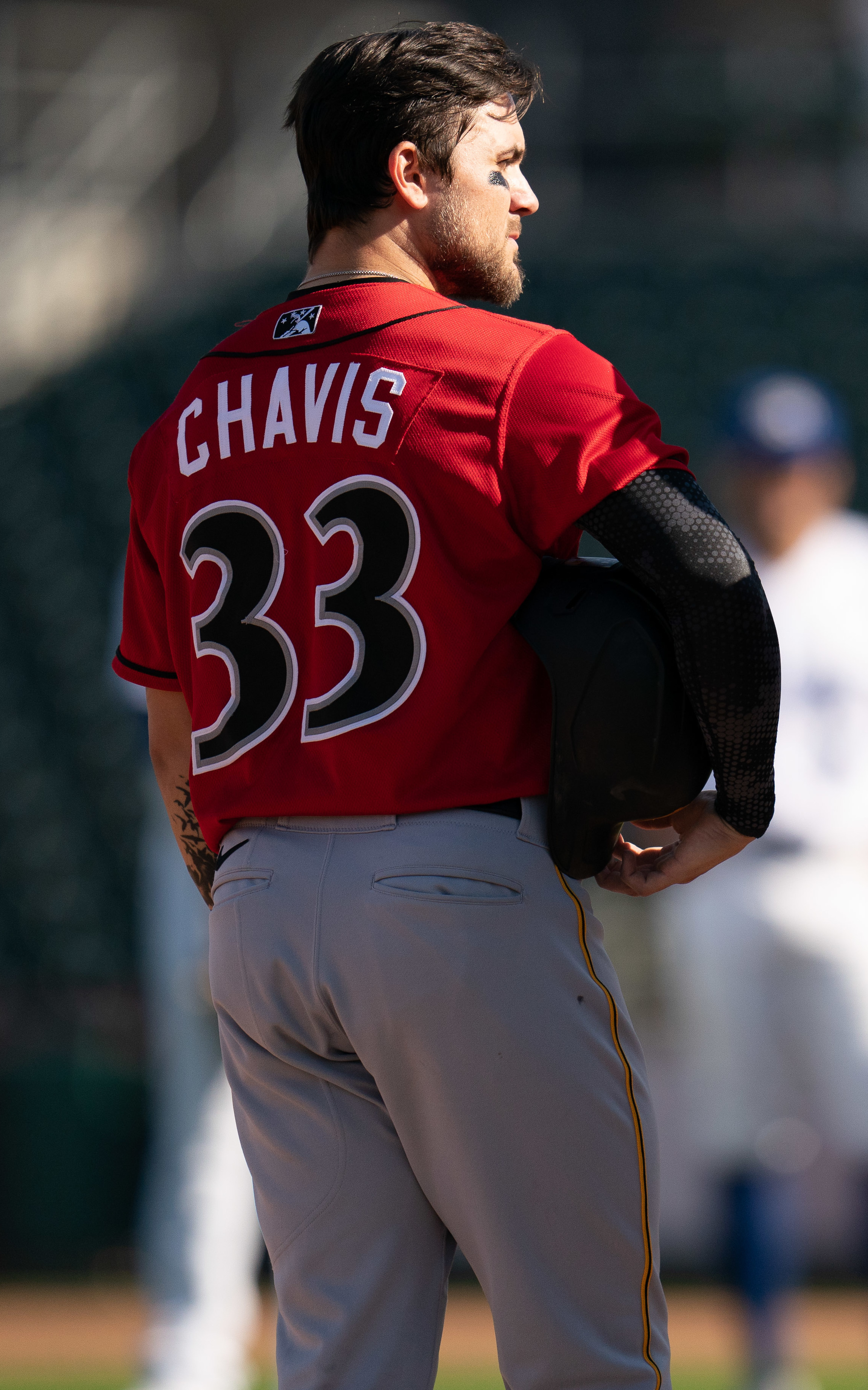
Michael Chavis (2014) made his MLB debut in April 2019 with the Red Sox.

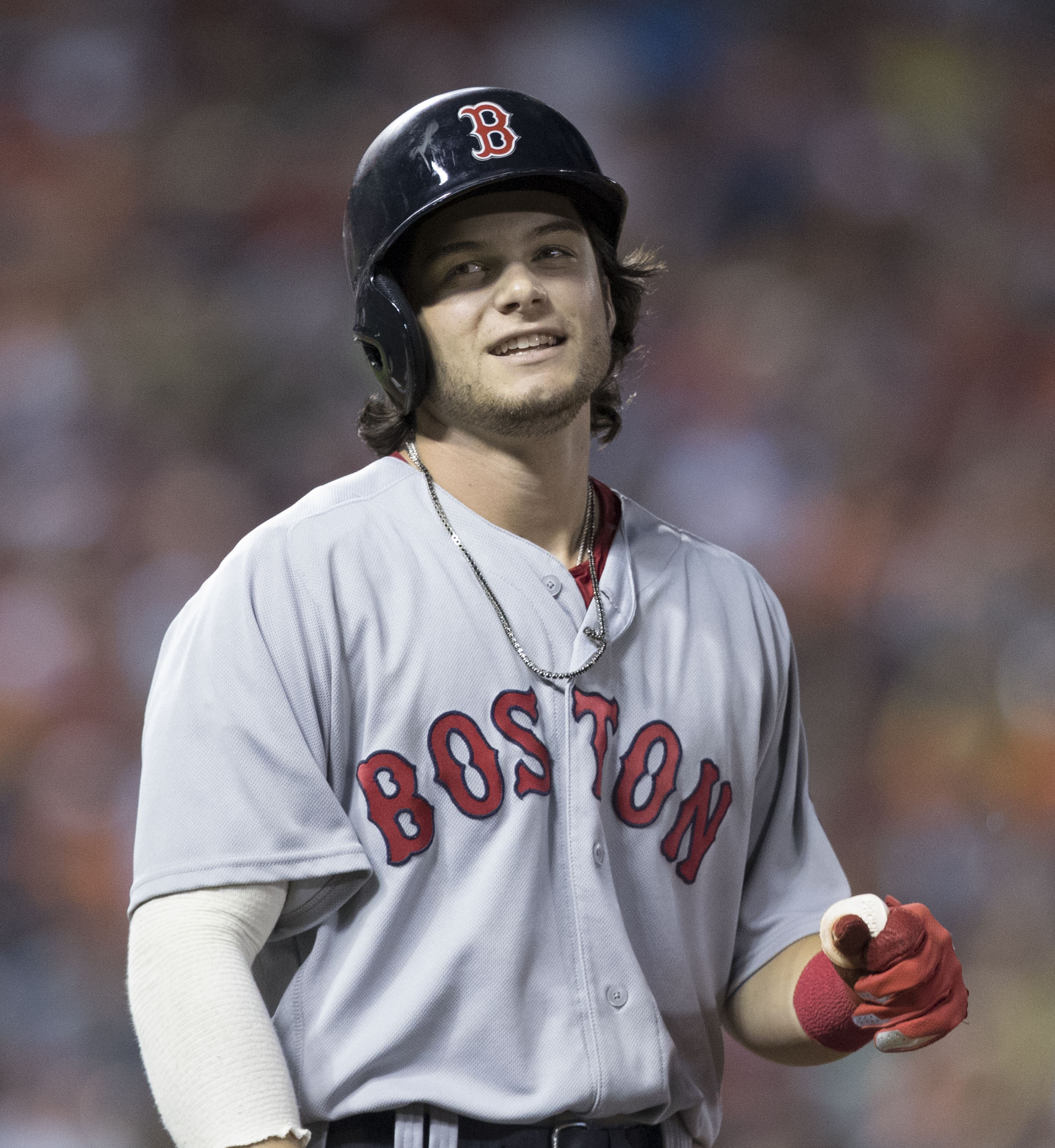
Andrew Benintendi (2015) was a member of Boston's 2018 championship team.

Year	Name	Pos.	School (Location)	Pick	MLB	Ref
1965	Billy Conigliaro	OF	Swampscott High School (Swampscott, Massachusetts)	5	1969–1973	
1966	Ken Brett	LHP	El Segundo High School (El Segundo, California)	4	1967–1981	
1967	Mike Garman	RHP	Caldwell High School (Caldwell, Idaho)	3	1969–1978	
1968	Tom Maggard	OF	John Glenn High School (Norwalk, California)	20	—	
1969	Noel Jenke	OF	University of Minnesota (Minneapolis, Minnesota)	13	—	
1970	Jimmy Hacker*	3B	Temple High School (Temple, Texas)	16	—	
1971	Jim Rice^{†}	OF	Hanna High School (Anderson, South Carolina)	15	1974–1989	
1972	Joel Bishop	SS	McClatchy High School (Sacramento, California)	16	—	
1973	Ted Cox	SS	Midwest City High School (Midwest City, Oklahoma)	17	1977–1981	
1974	Eddie Ford	SS	University of South Carolina (Columbia, South Carolina)	20	—	
1975	Otis Foster	1B	High Point University (High Point, North Carolina)	15	—	
1976	Bruce Hurst	LHP	Dixie High School (St. George, Utah)	22	1980–1994	
1977	Andrew Madden	RHP	New Hartford High School (New Hartford, New York)	13	—	
1978	no first-round pick^{[a]}					
1979	no first-round pick^{[b]}					
1980	no first-round pick^{[c]}					
1981	Steve Lyons	SS	Oregon State University (Corvallis, Oregon)	19	1985–1993	
1981	Kevin Burrell	C	Poway High School (Poway, California)	25^{[d]}	—	
1982	Sam Horn	1B	Morse High School (San Diego, California)	16^{[e]}	1987–1995	
1982	Rob Parkins	RHP	Cerritos High School (Cerritos, California)	18	—	
1982	Jeff Ledbetter	1B	Florida State University (Tallahassee, Florida)	26^{[f]}	—	
1983	Roger Clemens	RHP	University of Texas at Austin (Austin, Texas)	19	1984–2007	
1984	John Marzano	C	Temple University (Philadelphia, Pennsylvania)	14	1987–1998	
1985	Dan Gabriele	RHP	Western High School (Walled Lake, Michigan)	21	—	
1986	Greg McMurtry*	OF	Brockton High School (Brockton, Massachusetts)	14	—	
1987	Reggie Harris	RHP	Waynesboro High School (Waynesboro, Virginia)	26	1990–1999	
1987	Bob Zupcic	OF	Oral Roberts University (Tulsa, Oklahoma)	32^{§}^{[g]}	1991–1994	
1988	Tom Fischer	LHP	University of Wisconsin–Madison (Madison, Wisconsin)	12	—	
1989	Greg Blosser	OF	Sarasota High School (Sarasota, Florida)	16^{[h]}	1993–1994	
1989	Mo Vaughn	1B	Seton Hall University (South Orange, New Jersey)	23	1991–2003	
1989	Kevin Morton	LHP	Seton Hall University (South Orange, New Jersey)	29^{[i]}	1991	
1990	no first-round pick^{[j]}					
1991	Aaron Sele	RHP	Washington State University (Pullman, Washington)	23	1993–2007	
1991	J.J. Johnson	OF	Pine Plains High School (Pine Plains, New York)	37^{§}^{[k]}	—	
1991	Scott Hatteberg	C	Washington State University (Pullman, Washington)	43^{§}^{[l]}	1995–2008	
1992	no first-round pick^{[m]}					
1993	Trot Nixon '04	OF	New Hanover High School (Wilmington, North Carolina)	7	1996–2008	
1994	Nomar Garciaparra ('04)	SS	Georgia Institute of Technology (Atlanta, Georgia)	12	1996–2009	
1995	Andy Yount	RHP	Kingwood High School (Kingwood, Texas)	15	—	
1995	Corey Jenkins	OF	Dreher High School (Columbia, South Carolina)	26^{[n]}	—	
1996	Josh Garrett	RHP	South Spencer High School (Rockport, Indiana)	26	—	
1996	Chris Reitsma	RHP	Calgary Christian High School (Calgary, Alberta)	34^{§}^{[o]}	2001–2007	
1997	John Curtice	LHP	Great Bridge High School (Chesapeake, Virginia)	17	—	
1997	Mark Fischer	OF	Georgia Institute of Technology (Atlanta, Georgia)	35^{§}^{[p]}	—	
1998	Adam Everett	SS	University of South Carolina (Columbia, South Carolina)	12	2001–2011	
1999	Rick Asadoorian	OF	Northbridge High School (Whitinsville, Massachusetts)	17^{[q]}	—	
1999	Brad Baker	RHP	Pioneer Valley Regional High School (Leyden, Massachusetts)	40^{§}^{[r]}	—	
1999	Casey Fossum	LHP	Texas A&M University (College Station, Texas)	48^{§}^{[s]}	2001–2009	
2000	Phil Dumatrait	LHP	Bakersfield College (Bakersfield, California)	16	2007–2011	
2001	no first-round pick^{[t]}					
2002	no first-round pick^{[u]}					
2003	David Murphy ('07)	OF	Baylor University (Waco, Texas)	17	2006–2015	
2003	Matt Murton	OF	Georgia Institute of Technology (Atlanta, Georgia)	32^{§}^{[v]}	2005–2009	
2004	no first-round pick^{[w]}					
2005	Jacoby Ellsbury '07, '13	OF	Oregon State University (Corvallis, Oregon)	23^{[x]}	2007–2017	
2005	Craig Hansen	RHP	St. John's University (Jamaica, New York)	26^{[y]}	2005–2009	
2005	Clay Buchholz '13	RHP	Angelina College (Lufkin, Texas)	42^{§}^{[z]}	2007–2019	
2005	Jed Lowrie	2B	Stanford University (Stanford, California)	45^{§}^{[aa]}	2008–2022	
2005	Michael Bowden	RHP	Waubonsie Valley High School (Naperville, Illinois)	47^{§}^{[ab]}	2008–2013	
2006	Jason Place	OF	Wren High School (Piedmont, South Carolina)	27	—	
2006	Daniel Bard ('13)	RHP	University of North Carolina at Chapel Hill (Chapel Hill, North Carolina)	28^{[ac]}	2009–2013, 2020–2023	
2006	Kris Johnson	RHP	Wichita State University (Wichita, Kansas)	40^{§}^{[ad]}	2013–2014	
2006	Caleb Clay	RHP	Cullman High School (Cullman, Alabama)	44^{§}^{[ae]}	—	
2007	Nick Hagadone	LHP	University of Washington (Seattle, Washington)	55^{§}^{[af]}	2011–2015	
2007	Ryan Dent	SS	Wilson Classical High School (Long Beach, California)	62^{§}^{[ag]}	—	
2008	Casey Kelly	SS	Sarasota High School (Sarasota, Florida)	30	2012–2018	
2008	Bryan Price	RHP	Rice University (Houston, Texas)	45^{§}^{[ah]}	2014	
2009	Rey Fuentes	OF	Fernando Callejo High School (Manatí, Puerto Rico)	28	2013–2017	
2010	Kolbrin Vitek	2B	Ball State University (Muncie, Indiana)	20	—	
2010	Bryce Brentz	OF	Middle Tennessee State University (Murfreesboro, Tennessee)	36^{§}^{[ai]}	2014, 2016	
2010	Anthony Ranaudo	RHP	Louisiana State University (Baton Rouge, Louisiana)	39^{§}^{[aj]}	2014–2016	
2011	Matt Barnes '18	RHP	University of Connecticut (Storrs, Connecticut)	19^{[ak]}	2014–present	
2011	Blake Swihart '18	C	V. Sue Cleveland High School (Rio Rancho, New Mexico)	26^{[al]}	2015–2019	
2011	Henry Owens	LHP	Edison High School (Huntington Beach, California)	36^{§}^{[am]}	2015–2016	
2011	Jackie Bradley Jr. ('13) '18	OF	University of South Carolina (Columbia, South Carolina)	40^{§}^{[an]}	2013–2023	
2012	Deven Marrero	SS	Arizona State University (Tempe, Arizona)	24	2015–2022	
2012	Brian Johnson ('18)	LHP	University of Florida (Gainesville, Florida)	31^{[ao]}	2015–2019	
2012	Pat Light	RHP	Monmouth University (West Long Branch, New Jersey)	37^{§}^{[ap]}	2016	
2013	Trey Ball	LHP	New Castle Chrysler High School (New Castle, Indiana)	7	—	
2014	Michael Chavis	SS	Sprayberry High School (Marietta, Georgia)	26	2019–2023	
2014	Michael Kopech	RHP	Mount Pleasant High School (Mount Pleasant, Texas)	33^{§}^{[aq]}	2018, 2021–present	
2015	Andrew Benintendi '18	OF	University of Arkansas (Fayetteville, Arkansas)	7	2016–present	
2016	Jay Groome	LHP	Barnegat High School (Barnegat Township, New Jersey)	12	—	
2017	Tanner Houck	RHP	University of Missouri (Columbia, Missouri)	24	2020–present	
2018	Triston Casas	3B	American Heritage School (Plantation, Florida)	26	2022–present	
2019	no first-round pick^{[ar]}					
2020	Nick Yorke	2B	Archbishop Mitty High School (San Jose, California)	17	2024–present	
2021	Marcelo Mayer	SS	Eastlake High School (Chula Vista, California)	4	2025–present	
2022	Mikey Romero	SS	Orange Lutheran High School (Orange, California)	24	—	
2023	Kyle Teel	C	University of Virginia (Charlottesville, Virginia)	14	2025–present	
2024	Braden Montgomery	OF	Texas A&M (College Station, Texas)	12	—	
2025	Kyson Witherspoon	RHP	Oklahoma (Norman, Oklahoma)	15	—	
2025	Marcus Phillips	RHP	Universite of Tennessee (Knoxville, Tennessee)	33^{§}^{[aq]}	—	
2026	Jake Schaffner	SS	North Carolina (Chapel Hill, North Carolina)	20	—	

== See also ==
- Boston Red Sox minor league players

== Footnotes ==
- ^{V} Free agents are evaluated by the Elias Sports Bureau and rated "Type A", "Type B", or not compensation eligible. If a team offers arbitration to a player but that player refuses and subsequently signs with another team, the original team may receive additional draft picks. If a "Type A" free agent leaves in this way his previous team receives a supplemental pick and a compensation pick from the team with which he signs. If a "Type B" free agent leaves in this way his previous team receives only a supplemental pick.
- ^{a} The team lost their first-round pick in 1978 to the New York Yankees as compensation for signing free agent Mike Torrez.
- ^{b} The team lost their first-round pick in 1979 to the Oakland Athletics as compensation for signing Steve Renko.
- ^{c} The team lost their first-round pick in 1980 to the New York Mets as compensation for signing free agent Skip Lockwood.
- ^{d} The team gained a compensatory first-round pick in 1981 from the Baltimore Orioles for losing free agent Jim Dwyer.
- ^{e} The team gained a compensatory first-round pick in 1982 from the Texas Rangers for losing free agent Frank Tanana
- ^{f} The team gained a compensatory first-round pick in 1982 from the Oakland Athletics for losing free agent Joe Rudi.
- ^{g} The team gained a supplemental pick in 1987 for failing to sign 1986 first-round pick Greg McMurtry.
- ^{h} The team gained a compensatory first-round pick in 1989 from the San Diego Padres for losing free agent Bruce Hurst.
- ^{i} The team gained a supplemental first-round pick in 1989 for losing free agent Bruce Hurst.
- ^{j} The team lost their first-round pick in 1990 to the St. Louis Cardinals as compensation for signing free agent Tony Peña.
- ^{k} The team gained a supplemental first-round pick in 1991 for losing free agent Larry Anderson.
- ^{l} The team gained a supplemental first-round pick in 1991 for losing free agent Mike Boddicker.
- ^{m} The team lost their first-round pick in 1992 to the New York Mets as compensation for signing free agent Frank Viola.
- ^{n} The team gained a compensatory first-round pick in 1995 from the Cincinnati Reds for losing free agent Damon Berryhill.
- ^{o} The team gained a supplemental first-round pick in 1996 for losing free agent Erik Hanson.
- ^{p} The team gained a supplemental first-round pick in 1997 for losing free agent Roger Clemens.
- ^{q} The team gained a compensatory first-round pick in 1999 from the Los Angeles Angels for losing free agent Mo Vaughn.
- ^{r} The team gained a supplemental first-round pick in 1999 for losing free agent Mo Vaughn.
- ^{s} The team gained a supplemental first-round pick in 1999 for losing free agent Greg Swindell.
- ^{t} The team lost their first-round pick in 2001 to the Cleveland Indians as compensation for signing free agent Manny Ramirez.
- ^{u} The team lost their first-round pick in 2002 to the Oakland Athletics as compensation for signing free agent Johnny Damon.
- ^{v} The teamx gained a supplemental first-round pick in 2003 for losing free agent Cliff Floyd.
- ^{w} The team lost their first-round pick in 2004 to the Oakland Athletics as compensation for signing free agent Keith Foulke.
- ^{x} The team gained a compensatory first-round pick in 2005 from the Los Angeles Angels for losing free agent Orlando Cabrera.
- ^{y} The team gained a compensatory first-round pick in 2005 from the Los Angeles Dodgers for losing free agent Derek Lowe.
- ^{z} The team gained a supplemental first-round pick in 2005 for losing free agent Pedro Martínez.
- ^{aa} The team gained a supplemental first-round pick in 2005 for losing free agent Orlando Cabrera
- ^{ab} The team gained a supplemental first-round pick in 2005 for losing free agent Derek Lowe.
- ^{ac} The team gained a compensatory first-round pick in 2006 from the New York Yankees for losing free agent Johnny Damon.
- ^{ad} The team gained a supplemental first-round pick in 2006 for losing free agent Johnny Damon.
- ^{ae} The team gained a supplemental first-round pick in 2006 for losing free agent Bill Mueller.
- ^{af} The team gained a supplemental first-round pick in 2007 for losing free agent Álex González.
- ^{ag} The team gained a supplemental first-round pick in 2007 for losing free agent Keith Foulke.
- ^{ah} The team gained a supplemental first-round pick in 2008 for losing free agent Éric Gagné.
- ^{ai} The team gained a supplemental first-round pick in 2010 for losing free agent Billy Wagner.
- ^{aj} The team gained a supplemental first-round pick in 2010 for losing free agent Jason Bay.
- ^{ak} The team gained a compensatory first-round pick in 2011 for losing free agent Víctor Martínez.
- ^{al} The team gained a compensatory first-round pick in 2011 for losing free agent Adrián Beltré.
- ^{am} The team gained a supplemental first-round pick in 2011 for losing free agent Víctor Martínez.
- ^{an} The team gained a supplemental first-round pick in 2011 for losing free agent Adrián Beltré.
- ^{ao} The team gained a compensatory first-round pick in 2012 for losing free agent Jonathan Papelbon.
- ^{ap} The team gained a supplemental first-round pick in 2012 for losing free agent Jonathan Papelbon.
- ^{aq} The team gained a compensatory first-round pick in 2014 for losing free agent Jacoby Ellsbury.
- ^{ar} The team did not have a first-round pick in 2019 due to being more than $40 million over the MLB luxury tax threshold.
