= Rafael Novoa =

Rafael Novoa may refer to:

- Rafael Novoa (baseball)
- Rafael Novoa (actor)
