= 1989 Big East Conference baseball tournament =

American college baseball tournament

- Teams: 4
- Format: Double-elimination
- Finals site: Muzzy Field; Bristol, CT
- Champions: Villanova (1st title)
- Winning coach: George Bennett (1st title)
- MVP: Rafael Novoa (Villanova)

1989 Big East Conference baseball standings
	Conf.						Overall
Team	W		L		T	PCT	W		L		T	PCT
North Division
Providence ^{x}‍‍‍	12	–	6	–	0	.667	27	–	16	–	0	.628
Connecticut ‍‍‍	9	–	9	–	0	.500	27	–	16	–	0	.628
Boston College ‍‍‍	9	–	9	–	0	.500	20	–	17	–	0	.541
St. John's ‍‍‍	6	–	12	–	0	.333	19	–	19	–	0	.500
South Division
Seton Hall ^{x}‍‍‍	16	–	2	–	0	.889	33	–	19	–	1	.632
Villanova ‍‍‡‍^{y}	12	–	5	–	0	.706	42	–	13	–	0	.764
Georgetown ‍‍‍	7	–	11	–	0	.389	17	–	26	–	0	.395
Pittsburgh ‍‍‍	0	–	17	–	0	.000	6	–	25	–	0	.194
x – Division champion ‡ – Tournament champion y – Invited to the NCAA tournament As of June 30, 1989; Rankings from Collegiate Baseball

The 1989 Big East baseball tournament was held at Muzzy Field in Bristol, Connecticut. This was the fifth Big East baseball tournament, and was won by the Villanova Wildcats. As a result, Villanova earned the Big East Conference's automatic bid to the 1989 NCAA Division I baseball tournament. This was the Wildcat's first tournament championship.

== Format and seeding ==
The 1989 Big East baseball tournament was a 4 team double elimination tournament. The top two teams from each division, based on conference winning percentage only, earned berths in the tournament. Each division winner played the opposite division's runner up in the first round. Connecticut earned the second seed from the North by winning the season series against Boston College.

Team	W	L	Pct.	GB	Seed
North Division
Providence	12	6	.667	–	1N
Connecticut	9	9	.500	3	2N
Boston College	9	9	.500	3	–
St. John's	6	12	.333	6	–
South Division
Seton Hall	16	2	.889	–	1S
Villanova	12	5	.706	3.5	2S
Georgetown	7	11	.389	91.5	–
Pittsburgh	0	17	.000	15.5	–

== Tournament ==
First round
1N	Providence	0
2S	Villanova	11
1S	Seton Hall	8
2N	Connecticut	2
Lower round 1
1N	Providence	5*
2N	Connecticut	3*

Semi-finals
2S	Villanova	8
1S	Seton Hall	7
Lower final
1S	Seton Hall	4
1N	Providence	11

Finals
2S	Villanova	10	—
1N	Providence	7	—

* - Indicates game required 11 innings.

== All-Tournament Team ==
The following players were named to the All-Tournament team.

Position	Player	School
1B	Mo Vaughn	Seton Hall
2B	Bill Butler	Providence
3B	Gary Scott	Villanova
SS	Bob McCreary	Villanova
C	Dan Farren	Villanova
OF	Mike Randazzo	Seton Hall
OF	Chris Maloof	Providence
OF	Mike Wismer	Villanova
DH	Gene Schall	Villanova
P	Rafael Novoa	Villanova

== Jack Kaiser Award ==
Rafael Novoa was the winner of the 1989 Jack Kaiser Award. Novoa was a pitcher for Villanova.
