= 1987 Big East Conference baseball tournament =

American college baseball tournament

- Teams: 4
- Format: Double-elimination
- Finals site: Muzzy Field; Bristol, CT
- Champions: Seton Hall (1st title)
- Winning coach: Mike Sheppard (1st title)
- MVP: Mo Vaughn (Seton Hall)

1987 Big East Conference baseball standings
	Conf.				Overall
Team	W		L	PCT	W		L	PCT
North Division
St. John's ^{x}‍‍‍	12	–	6	.667	24	–	21	.533
Connecticut ‍‍‍	11	–	7	.611	23	–	16	.590
Boston College ‍‍‍	8	–	10	.444	13	–	21	.382
Providence ‍‍‍	5	–	13	.278	15	–	25	.375
South Division
No. 22 Seton Hall ^{x}‍‍‡‍^{y}	16	–	2	.889	45	–	10	.818
Villanova ‍‍‍	11	–	7	.611	35	–	18	.660
Pittsburgh ‍‍‍	5	–	13	.278	13	–	18	.419
Georgetown ‍‍‍	4	–	14	.222	14	–	30	.318
x – Division champion ‡ – Tournament champion y – Invited to the NCAA tournament As of June 30, 1987; Rankings from Collegiate Baseball

The 1987 Big East baseball tournament was held at Muzzy Field in Bristol, Connecticut. This was the third Big East baseball tournament, and was won by the Seton Hall Pirates. As a result, Seton Hall earned the Big East Conference's automatic bid to the 1987 NCAA Division I baseball tournament.

== Format and seeding ==
The 1987 Big East baseball tournament was a 4 team double elimination tournament. The top two teams from each division, based on conference winning percentage only, earned berths in the tournament. Each division winner played the opposite division's runner up in the first round.

Team	W	L	Pct.	GB	Seed
North Division
St. John's	12	6	.667	–	1N
Connecticut	11	7	.611	1	2N
Boston College	8	10	.444	4	–
Providence	5	13	.278	7	–
South Division
Seton Hall	16	2	.889	–	1S
Villanova	11	7	.611	5	2S
Pittsburgh	8	10	.444	8	–
Georgetown	4	14	.222	12	–

== Tournament ==
First round
1N	St. John's	3
2S	Villanova	9
1S	Seton Hall	6
2N	Connecticut	2
Lower round 1
1N	St. John's	13
2N	Connecticut	4

Semi-finals
2S	Villanova	1
1S	Seton Hall	18
Lower final
2S	Villanova	12
1N	St. John's	2

Finals
1S	Seton Hall	10	—
2S	Villanova	9	—

== All-Tournament Team ==
The following players were named to the All-Tournament team.

Position	Player	School
1B	Marteese Robinson	Seton Hall
2B	John Sheppard	Seton Hall
3B	Andy Walker	Connecticut
SS	Rob McCreary	Villanova
C	Craig Biggio	Seton Hall
OF	Mike Schick	Villanova
OF	Pete Petrone	Seton Hall
OF	Robert Lambraia	St. John's
DH	Mo Vaughn	Seton Hall
P	Rafael Novoa	Villanova

== Jack Kaiser Award ==
Mo Vaughn was the winner of the 1987 Jack Kaiser Award. Vaughn was a designated hitter for Seton Hall.
