= Mike Sheppard (baseball) =

American baseball coach (1936–2019)

Biographical details
- Born: April 12, 1936
- Died: April 6, 2019 (aged 82)

Playing career
- ?: Seton Hall
- Position: Catcher

Coaching career (HC unless noted)
- 1973–2000: Seton Hall
- 2002–2003: Seton Hall

Head coaching record
- Overall: 998-540-11 (Note: This total includes the 2001 season, in which Sheppard's son coached the team while he recovered from heart surgery. Without the 2001 season, Sheppard's record is 964–517–10.)
- Tournaments: NCAA D1: 14-20; Big East: 22-26

Accomplishments and honors

Championships
- NCAA Regional: 1974, 1975; Big East: 1990; Big East South Division: 1985, 1986, 1987, 1989; Big East Tournament: 1987

Awards
- Big East Coach of the Year: 1985, 1987, 1989

Mike "Shep" Sheppard Sr. (April 12, 1936 – April 6, 2019) was an American college baseball coach, mainly as the head coach at Seton Hall from 1973 to 2000 and 2002 to 2003. In 30 seasons as head coach, he led Seton Hall to 10 NCAA tournaments and two College World Series. He had an overall record of 998-540-11.

== Coaching career ==
After playing for Ownie Carroll at Seton Hall, Sheppard coached high school baseball. He became the head coach at Seton Hall after Carroll retired at the end of the 1972 season.

In Sheppard's first seven seasons (1973–1979), the Pirates played in six NCAA tournaments and two College World Series. The team went 22–8 in his first season. It reached the District 2 Regional, where it lost consecutive games to Penn State and Temple. In 1974, Seton Hall went 3–0 in the District 2 Regional to reach the College World Series, where it lost to Southern Illinois, 5–1, and Texas, 12–2. In 1975, the team returned to the College World Series, where it went 1–2 with an elimination-game win over Florida State. The Pirates also qualified for NCAA tournaments in 1976, 1977, and 1979, reaching the Northeast Regional final against Maine in 1976. Future major leaguers Rick Cerone and Dan Morogiello played for Sheppard during the 1970s.

Seton Hall appeared in the NCAA tournament three more times in the 1980s (1982, 1984, and 1987). Their deepest run came in 1984, when they again lost to Maine in the Northeast Regional final. The program began competing the Big East Conference in 1985. In its first six seasons in the conference (1985–1990), it won the South Division five times and played in the Big East tournament five times. It won the tournament in 1987. Sheppard was named Big East Coach of the Year in 1985, 1987, and 1989. Several notable players played for Sheppard in the 1980s: John Morris, Tony DeFrancesco, Pat Pacillo, Rich Scheid, Craig Biggio, John Valentin, Kevin Morton, and Mo Vaughn.

In the 1990s, Seton Hall won a regular-season conference championship in 1990 and was placed second multiple times but failed to qualify for an NCAA tournament. Its highest win total came in 1995, when the team went 38–16. Future major leaguers Mike Moriarty, Matt Morris, and Jason Grilli played for Sheppard during the decade.

In 2000, Seton Hall returned to the NCAA tournament. The Pirates went 36–14 in the regular season. They lost in the Big East championship game, but received an at-large bid to the 2000 NCAA tournament. As the third seed in the Columbia Regional, they went 0–2, losing games to second-seeded Wake Forest and fourth-seeded Liberty.

Sheppard missed the entire 2001 season while recovering from triple-bypass surgery. His son, Rob, served as interim coach during the season.

Sheppard returned for two seasons but resigned following the 2003 season in controversial circumstances. In March 2003, Steve Politi of the Newark Star-Ledger published an article in which former players and their parents accused Sheppard, an ex-Marine, of using harsh punishments and racial slurs. Others, including other Former players, fellow coaches, and media members, defended Sheppard and argued there was no proof of such behavior. Seton Hall conducted a confidential investigation of the incident, the results of which were not published. Sheppard resigned in summer 2003; the university's press release about his resignation cited "health reasons and a desire to spend more time with his children and grandchildren." Including games during the 2001, when his son Rob served as interim head coach, Sheppard retired with 998 career victories. Rob served as Seton Hall's interim head coach in 2004 before being named to the position permanently for the 2005 season.

== Head coaching record ==
Below is a table of Sheppard's yearly records as a collegiate head baseball coach.

Record table
Season	Team	Overall	Conference	Standing	Postseason
Seton Hall (1973–1984)
1973	Seton Hall	22–8			NCAA Regional
1974	Seton Hall	33–10–1			College World Series
1975	Seton Hall	32–10			College World Series
1976	Seton Hall	33–17–1			NCAA Regional
1977	Seton Hall	37–14			NCAA Regional
1978	Seton Hall	24–13			
1979	Seton Hall	32–11–1			NCAA Regional
1980	Seton Hall	25–12–1			
1981	Seton Hall	33–11			
1982	Seton Hall	41–13			NCAA Regional
1983	Seton Hall	34–15			
1984	Seton Hall	41–13			NCAA Regional
Seton Hall (Big East Conference) (1985–2000)
1985	Seton Hall	44–19–1	15–3	1st (South)	Big East tournament
1986	Seton Hall	32–26	13–5	1st (South)	Big East tournament
1987	Seton Hall	45–10	16–2	1st (South)	NCAA Regional
1988	Seton Hall	39–16	12–6	2nd (South)	Big East tournament
1989	Seton Hall	33–19–1	16–2	1st (South)	Big East tournament
1990	Seton Hall	35–18	16–4	1st	Big East tournament
1991	Seton Hall	26–19	10–9	5th	
1992	Seton Hall	28–27	14–7	2nd	Big East tournament
1993	Seton Hall	30–18	12–8	2nd	Big East tournament
1994	Seton Hall	32–21	12–8	3rd	Big East tournament
1995	Seton Hall	38–16	14–7	T–2nd	Big East tournament
1996	Seton Hall	18–27–1	5–17–1	5th (National)	
1997	Seton Hall	32–22	13–11	T–2nd (National)	Big East tournament
1998	Seton Hall	25–23	12–10	6th	Big East tournament
1999	Seton Hall	32–19–1	14–11	4th	Big East tournament
2000	Seton Hall	40–18	18–7	T–2nd	NCAA Regional
Seton Hall (Big East Conference) (2002–2003)
2002	Seton Hall	25–28	11–15	9th	
2003	Seton Hall	23–24	11–14	8th	
Seton Hall:		998–540–11	234–146–1		
Total:		998–540–11			
National champion Postseason invitational champion Conference regular season champion Conference regular season and conference tournament champion Division regular season champion Division regular season and conference tournament champion Conference tournament champion

== Personal ==
Three of Sheppard's sons are also baseball coaches. Rob replaced him as Seton Hall's head coach, and Mike Jr. and John are high school baseball coaches. His son-in-law, Ed Blankmeyer, is the manager of the Brooklyn Cyclones.

Sheppard is an inductee of the Newark Athletic Hall of Fame (1988) and American Baseball Coaches Association (ABCA) Hall of Fame (2011).

Seton Hall's softball venue is named for Sheppard, who died on April 6, 2019, six days before his 83rd birthday.
