= Gene Schall =

American baseball player (born 1970)

- First baseman
- Born: June 5, 1970 (age 56); Abington, Pennsylvania, U.S.
- Batted: Right Threw: Right

MLB debut
- June 16, 1995, for the Philadelphia Phillies

Last MLB appearance
- September 29, 1996, for the Philadelphia Phillies

MLB statistics
- Batting average: .252
- Home runs: 2
- Runs batted in: 15
- Stats at Baseball Reference

Teams
- Philadelphia Phillies (1995–1996)

Eugene David Schall (born June 5, 1970) is an American former Major League Baseball first baseman. He played during two seasons at the major league level for the Philadelphia Phillies. He was drafted by the Phillies in the 4th round of the 1991 amateur draft. Schall played his first professional season with their Class A (Short Season) Batavia Clippers in 1991, and his last with their Triple-A Scranton/Wilkes-Barre Red Barons in 2002.

Schall played college baseball at Villanova, earning All-Tournament honors after the 1989 Big East Conference baseball tournament. He was named an ABCA All-American in 1991.

== See also ==
- 1991 College Baseball All-America Team
