= 1968 Major League Baseball draft =

Major League Baseball draft

Overview
- First selection: Tim Foli; New York Mets
- First round selections: 20

The 1968 Major League Baseball draft took place prior to the 1968 MLB season. The draft saw the New York Mets take shortstop Tim Foli first overall.

== First round selections ==
= All-Star	= Baseball Hall of Famer

The following are the first round picks in the 1968 Major League Baseball draft.

Pick	Player	Team	Position	Hometown/School
1	Tim Foli	New York Mets	SS	Canoga Park, California
2	* Pete Broberg	Oakland Athletics	RHP	Palm Beach, Florida
3	Marty Cott	Houston Astros	C	Buffalo, New York
4	Thurman Munson	New York Yankees	C	Kent State University
5	Bobby Valentine	Los Angeles Dodgers	OF	Stamford, Connecticut
6	Robert Weaver	Cleveland Indians	SS	Jacksonville, Florida
7	Curtis Moore	Atlanta Braves	OF	Denison, Texas
8	Don Castle	Washington Senators	LHP	Coldwater, Mississippi
9	Dick Sharon	Pittsburgh Pirates	OF	Redwood City, California
10	Junior Kennedy	Baltimore Orioles	SS	Arvin, California
11	Greg Luzinski	Philadelphia Phillies	1B	Prospect Heights, Illinois
12	Lloyd Allen	California Angels	RHP	Selma, California
13	Tim Grant	Cincinnati Reds	RHP	Boykins, Virginia
14	Rich McKinney	Chicago White Sox	SS	Ohio University
15	Ralph Rickey	Chicago Cubs	OF	University of Oklahoma
16	Alex Rowell	Minnesota Twins	OF	Luther College
17	Gary Matthews	San Francisco Giants	OF	Pacoima, California
18	Robert Robinson	Detroit Tigers	OF	Chester, Virginia
19	James Hairston	St. Louis Cardinals	OF	Dayton, Ohio
20	Tom Maggard	Boston Red Sox	OF-C	Norwalk, California

* Did not sign

== Other notable selections ==
= All-Star

Pick	Player	Team	Position
25	Bill Buckner	Los Angeles Dodgers	First Baseman
33	Milt Wilcox	Cincinnati Reds	Pitcher
85	Burt Hooton*	New York Mets	Pitcher
128	Cecil Cooper	Boston Red Sox	First Baseman
161	Joe Ferguson	Los Angeles Dodgers	Outfielder
174	Ross Grimsley*	Detroit Tigers	Pitcher
180	Tom Kelly	Seattle Pilots	Outfielder
185	Doyle Alexander	Los Angeles Dodgers	Pitcher
237	Milt May	Pittsburgh Pirates	Shortstop
238	Al Bumbry	Baltimore Orioles	Outfielder
248	Ben Oglivie	Boston Red Sox	Infield-Outfielder
256	Duane Kuiper*	New York Yankees	Shortstop
301	John Milner	New York Mets	Outfielder
309	Bruce Kison	Pittsburgh Pirates	Pitcher
354	Steve Stone*	Cleveland Indians	Pitcher
363	Oscar Gamble	Chicago Cubs	Outfielder
399	Ken Forsch	Houston Astros	Pitcher
402	John Lowenstein	Cleveland Indians	Shortstop
448	Ted Gilje	Los Angeles Dodgers	Pitcher
507	Bill Lee	Boston Red Sox	Pitcher
528	Craig Swan*	St. Louis Cardinals	Pitcher
574	Paul Splittorff	Kansas City Royals	Pitcher
594	Bob Forsch	St. Louis Cardinals	Third Baseman-Pitcher

* Did not sign

== Notes ==
Preceded by Ron Blomberg	1st Overall Picks; Tim Foli	Succeeded by Jeff Burroughs
