= Joe Vitiello =

American baseball player (born 1970)

- Designated hitter
- Born: April 11, 1970 (age 55); Cambridge, Massachusetts, U.S.
- Batted: Right Threw: Right

Professional debut
- MLB: April 29, 1995, for the Kansas City Royals
- NPB: March 24, 2001, for the Orix BlueWave

Last appearance
- NPB: October 5, 2001, for the Orix BlueWave
- MLB: September 28, 2003, for the Montreal Expos

MLB statistics
- Batting average: .248
- Home runs: 26
- Runs batted in: 104

NPB statistics
- Batting average: .275
- Home runs: 22
- Runs batted in: 83
- Stats at Baseball Reference

Teams
- Kansas City Royals (1995–1999); San Diego Padres (2000); Orix BlueWave (2001); Montreal Expos (2003)

Joseph David Vitiello (/ˌvɪtiˈɛloʊ/; born April 11, 1970) is an American former professional baseball player who was a designated hitter from 1995–2003. He played for the Kansas City Royals, San Diego Padres, and Montreal Expos of Major League Baseball (MLB). He also played for the Orix BlueWave of Nippon Professional Baseball (NPB) in 2001.

Vitiello attended the University of Alabama. In 1989 and 1990 he played collegiate summer baseball with the Hyannis Mets of the Cape Cod Baseball League and was named a league all-star in 1990. He was selected by the Royals in the first round (7th overall) of the 1991 MLB draft.

== See also ==
- 1991 College Baseball All-America Team
