= 1991 College Baseball All-America Team =

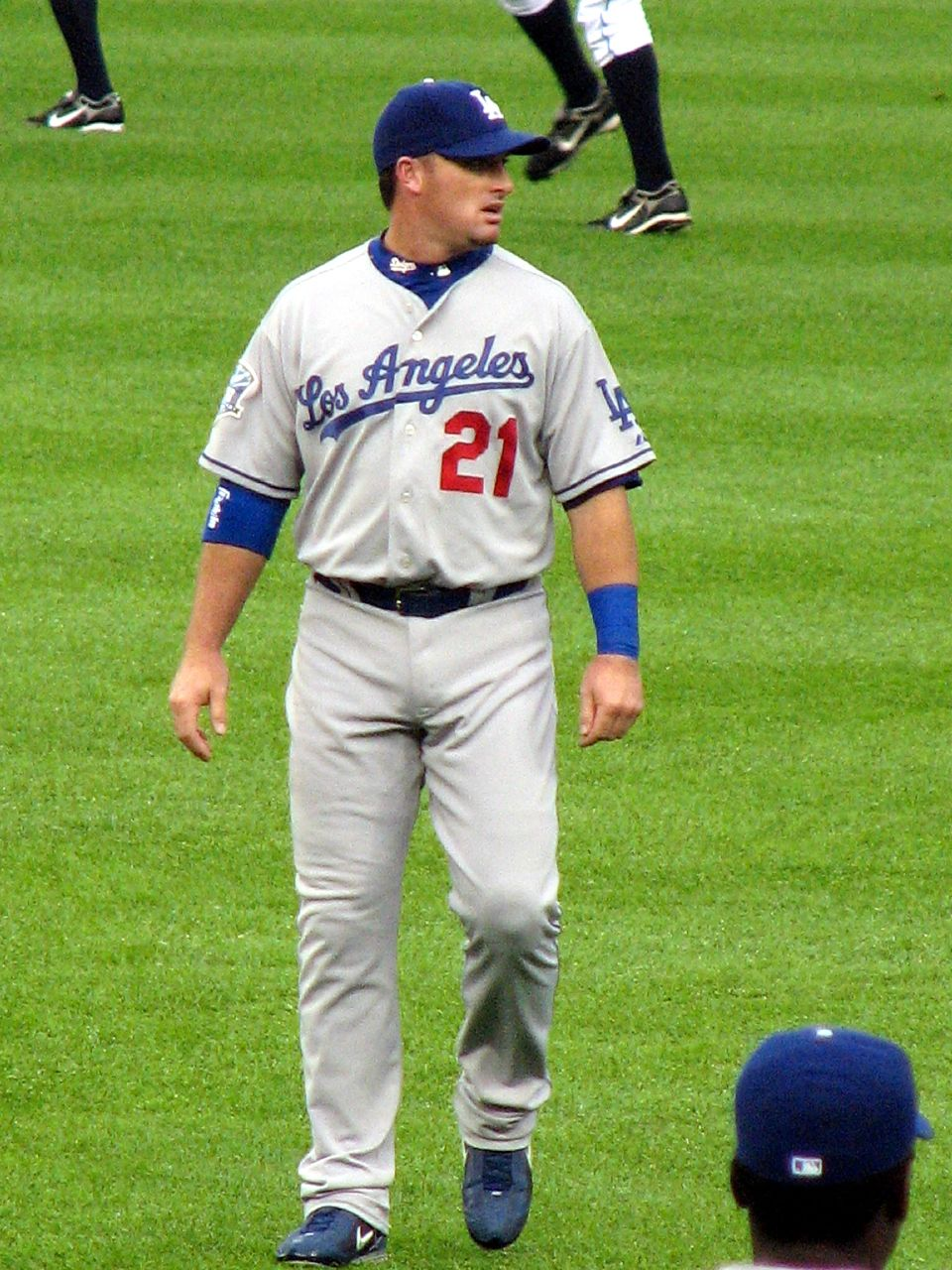
Mark Sweeney, the career pinch hit RBI recordholder, was named to the All-America Team in 1991 by both the American Baseball Coaches Association and Collegiate Baseball.

This is a list of college baseball players named first team All-Americans for the 1991 NCAA Division I baseball season. In 1991, there were three generally recognized All-America selectors for baseball: the American Baseball Coaches Association, Baseball America, and the Collegiate Baseball Newspaper, as The Sporting News did not name an All-America team that year. In order to be considered a "consensus" All-American, a player must have been selected by at least two of these.

== Key ==
A	American Baseball Coaches Association
B	Baseball America
C	Collegiate Baseball Newspaper
	Member of the National College Baseball Hall of Fame
	Consensus All-American – selected by all three organizations
	Consensus All-American – selected by two organizations

== All-Americans ==
Position	Name	School	#	A	B	C	Other awards and honors
Starting pitcher	Bill Blanchette	Hawaii	1	—	—	✓	
Starting pitcher	John Burke	Florida	1	—	✓	—	
Starting pitcher	Craig Clayton	Cal State Northridge	2	—	✓	✓	
Starting pitcher	Keith Garagozzo	Delaware	2	✓	—	✓	
Starting pitcher	Bobby Jones	Fresno State	3	✓	✓	✓	ABCA Player of the Year Collegiate Baseball Player of the Year Rotary Smith Award
Starting pitcher	Tony Phillips	Southern Miss	1	—	—	✓	
Starting pitcher	Kennie Steenstra	Wichita State	3	✓	✓	✓	
Starting pitcher	Steve Whitaker	Long Beach State	1	—	✓	—	
Relief Pitcher	Steve Montgomery	Pepperdine	1	✓	—	—	
Relief Pitcher	Phil Stidham	Arkansas	1	—	—	✓	
Catcher	Michael Daniel	Oklahoma State	1	—	—	✓	
Catcher	Pedro Grifol	Florida State	2	✓	✓	—	
First baseman	David McCarty	Stanford	3	✓	✓	✓	Baseball America Player of the Year
Second baseman	Jimmy Crowley	Clemson	1	✓	—	—	
Second baseman	Billy Hall	Wichita State	1	—	—	✓	
Second baseman	Steve Rodriguez	Pepperdine	1	—	✓	—	
Shortstop	Brent Gates	Minnesota	3	✓	✓	✓	
Third baseman	Andy Bruce	Georgia Tech	1	—	—	✓	
Third baseman	Scott Stahoviak	Creighton	2	✓	✓	—	
Outfielder	Mike Kelly	Arizona State	3	✓	✓	✓	Golden Spikes Award
Outfielder	Mike Neill	Villanova	1	✓	—	—	
Outfielder	Mark Smith	USC	2	—	✓	✓	
Outfielder	Mark Sweeney	Maine	2	✓	—	✓	
Outfielder	Tom Vantiger	Iowa State	1	✓	—	—	
Outfielder	Joe Vitiello	Alabama	1	—	✓	—	
Designated hitter	Michael Daniel	Oklahoma State	1	—	✓	—	
Designated hitter	Gene Schall	Villanova	1	✓	—	—	
Designated hitter	Scott Talanoa	Long Beach State	1	—	—	✓	
Utility player	Brooks Kieschnick	Texas	1	✓	—	—	

== See also ==
- List of college baseball awards
