= Trey Ball =

American baseball player (born 1994)

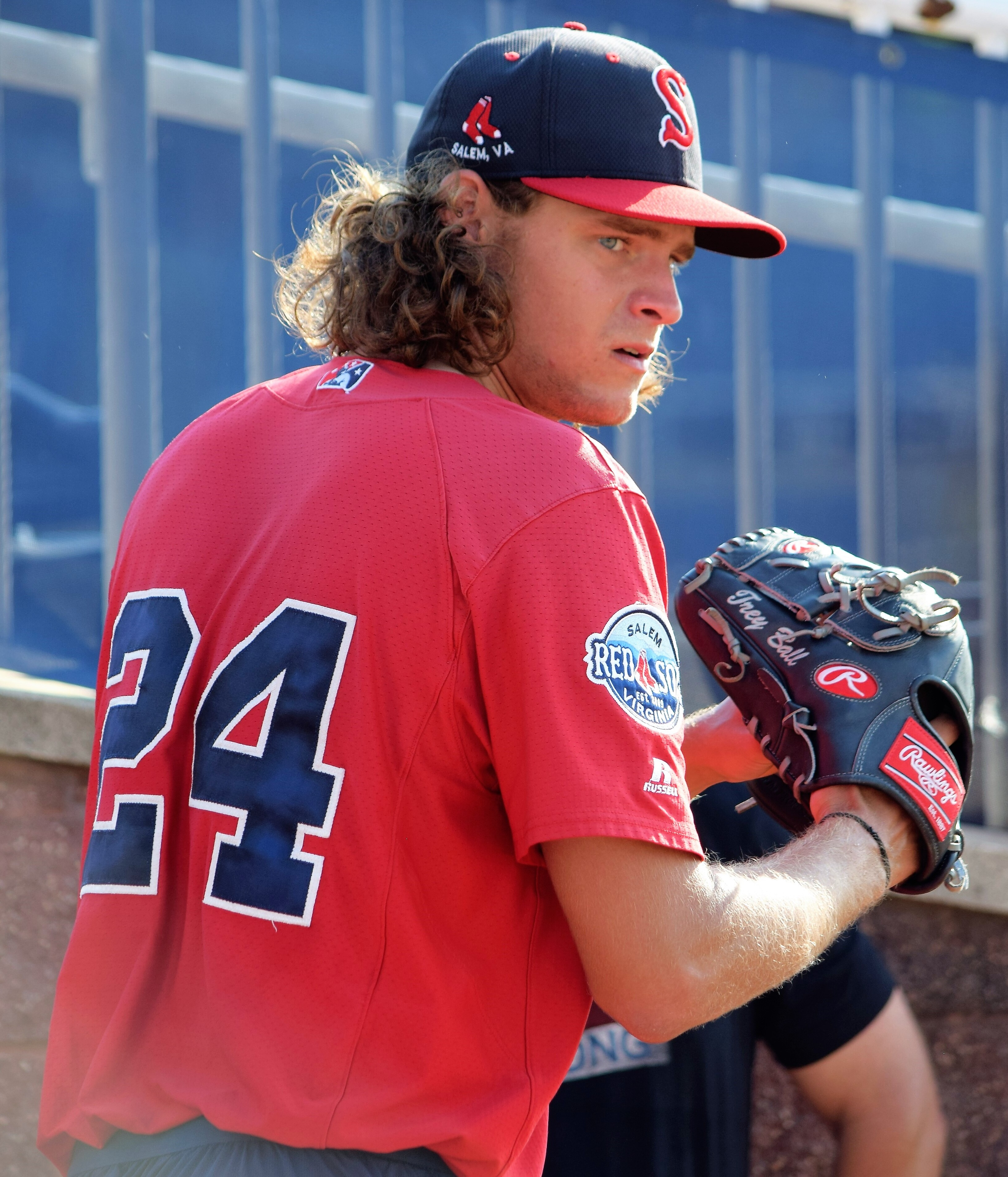
- Ball with the Salem Red Sox in 2016
- Pitcher / Outfielder
- Born: June 27, 1994 (age 32); New Castle, Indiana, U.S.
- Bats: Left Throws: Left
- Stats at Baseball Reference

Ronald Eugene "Trey" Ball III (born June 27, 1994) is an American former professional baseball pitcher. The Boston Red Sox selected him in the early first round of the 2013 Major League Baseball draft. Ball never pitched above AA for the Red Sox organization, and given his premier draft placement, Ball is considered one of the biggest draft busts in team history.

== Career ==
Ball graduated from New Castle High School in New Castle, Indiana, where he played for the school's baseball team as a pitcher and outfielder. In his senior year, Ball led his team to the North Central Conference championship and won the Gatorade Indiana Baseball Player of the Year Award. Ball committed to attend the University of Texas at Austin, where he would play college baseball for the Texas Longhorns baseball team.

The Boston Red Sox selected Ball in the first round, with the seventh overall selection, in the 2013 MLB draft. He signed with the Red Sox, receiving a $2.75 million signing bonus, and spent 2013 with the Gulf Coast Red Sox of the rookie-level Gulf Coast League, where he had an 0–1 win–loss record with a 6.43 ERA in seven innings pitched. In 2014, he played for the Greenville Drive of the Single–A South Atlantic League where he pitched to a 5–10 record and 4.68 ERA in 22 starts, and in 2015, he pitched for the Salem Red Sox of the High–A Carolina League, where he compiled a 9–13 record, 4.73 ERA, and 1.46 WHIP in 25 starts. Ball spent 2016 back with Salem where he was 8–6 with a 3.84 ERA in 23 games started and 2017 with the Portland Sea Dogs of the Double–A Eastern League, where he collected a 7–12 record and 5.27 ERA in 25 games (24 starts).

In 2018, Ball returned to Portland as a relief pitcher. He continued to struggle, pitching to a 7.58 ERA in 65 1/3 innings. In 2019, Ball planned to become a two-way player, as both a pitcher and an outfielder. During the season, he appeared in five Gulf Coast League games, batting 2-for-14 (.143); he did not pitch in any games. He became a free agent on November 4, 2019, when his contract with the Red Sox expired.

== Personal life ==
Ball is a cousin of Bryant McIntosh.
