= Eoin Monahan =

Irish footballer

Eoin Patrick Monahan (born 10 June 1967) is an Irish former footballer who played as a midfielder.

== Career ==
He joined Shamrock Rovers in August 1985 from St Josephs Boys making his league debut on 12 January 1986.

Monaghan was the last substitute to ever appear at Glenmalure Park.

He made a total of 21 appearances for the Hoops including one in the European Champion Clubs' Cup at Parkhead against Celtic.

In August 1987 he received a full scholarship to Seton Hall University and later became a financial advisor based in New Jersey.
