= Rich Scheid =

American baseball player (born 1965)

- Pitcher
- Born: February 3, 1965 (age 60); Staten Island, New York, U.S.
- Batted: Left Threw: Left

MLB debut
- September 11, 1992, for the Houston Astros

Last MLB appearance
- May 12, 1995, for the Florida Marlins

MLB statistics
- Win–loss record: 1–4
- Earned run average: 4.45
- Strikeouts: 35
- Stats at Baseball Reference

Teams
- Houston Astros (1992); Florida Marlins (1994–1995)

Richard Paul Scheid (born February 3, 1965) is an American former professional baseball pitcher. He played for the Houston Astros (1992) and Florida Marlins (1994–1995) of Major League Baseball (MLB).

Scheid attended Seton Hall University, where he played college baseball for the Pirates under head coach Mike Sheppard. He was inducted into the Staten Island Sports Hall of Fame in 2020.
