= William F. Andrews (businessman) =

American businessman

- Born: c. 1933 (age 92–93)
- Education: University of Maryland; Seton Hall University
- Occupation: Businessman
- Children: 5

William F. Andrews (born c. 1933) is an American businessman. He is the former chairman of the Singer Corporation and the Corrections Corporation of America (now known as CoreCivic).

== Early life ==
William F. Andrews was born circa 1933. He earned a bachelor of science degree in business administration from the University of Maryland and a master in business administration from Seton Hall University.

== Career ==
Andrews began his career as a sales representative at Scovill in 1958. He served as its president, CEO and chairman from 1981 to 1985. He joined the Singer Corporation as an executive in 1986, eventually serving as its president, CEO and chairman.

Andrews served as the chairman of Corrections Corporation of America (now known as CoreCivic) from August 2000 to July 2008. He also served as one of its directors from 1986 to 1998, and from 2008 to 2014. In 2011, he earned $1.5 million in stock options only.

Andrews was elected to the board of directors of O'Charley's in 2004. He also serves on the advisory board of Harpeth Capital.

== Personal life ==
Andrews is married with five children.
