= Peter J. Economou =

American sports psychologist

Peter J. Economou Ph. D, ABPP
- Known for: Sports Psychology

Academic background
- Education: Ph. D, Counseling Psychology
- Alma mater: Seton Hall University

Academic work
- Discipline: Psychology
- Sub-discipline: Cognitive behavioral therapy
- Institutions: Felician University; Rutgers University
- Notable works: The Relationship Between Stress, Fatigue, and Cognitive Functioning; Modismos: Mindfulness and the Importance of Language With Latin American Clients; Meditation Journal for Anxiety: Daily Meditations, Prompts, and Practices for Finding Calm; Mindfulness Working for Beginners: Exercises and Meditations to Relieve Stress, Find Joy, and Cultivate Gratitude
- Website: https://gsapp.rutgers.edu/faculty/peter-economou

Peter J. Economou is a psychologist, mental health counselor, academic executive, researcher, and performance coach of American football. He is best known as an advocate of integrating and promoting mental health awareness in collegiate sports and the founder of two nonprofit organizations: Share Our World, and The Counseling and Wellness Institute.

== Education ==
Peter Economou is an alumnus of the Seton Hall University, from his Bachelor studies, finishing with a degree in Biological Science in 2002, through his Doctor of Philosophy, major in Counselling Psychology studies degree in 2011; his doctoral dissertation is titled "Experiences of the White Gay Male: An Investigation of the Relationship between Factors of Being Gay, Heterosexism, and the Stress Response System." In between, he studied Master of Arts, major in Counseling and Psychological Studies, graduating in 2006, then took up Educational Specialist studies in Counseling and Psychological studies, which he completed in 2007. Economou became the first Seton Hall swimmer to win a Big East Conference butterfly title and was named the program’s Sophomore Male Athlete of the Year in 2001. He was formally inducted into the Seton Hall Athletics Hall of Fame on 21 January 2023.

=== Licenses and certifications ===
Economou is licensed and practicing as a psychologist in New York and as psychologist and Professional Counselor in New Jersey, while teaching in the university, and fulfilling other professional roles. He is Board Certified in Cognitive and Behavioral Therapy, and a Certified Mental Performance Consultant through the Association of Applied Sport Psychology.

== Career and research ==
Peter Economou previously taught at the Felician University, before being employed in Rutgers University since 2018, where he is currently an assistant professor, head of the Organizational Psychology Program while also being the Director of Behavioral Health and Sport Psychology Department. The embedded program is regarded by Rutgers as one of only two Power‑5 athletics departments whose sport‑psychology services are overseen by tenure‑track faculty.

In 2008, he founded the nonprofit Non-governmental Organization, Share Our World, dedicated to delivering culturally centered education, advancing cultural diversity, and expanding awareness around mental health. He also founded the Counseling and Wellness Institute in 2015 to support education and advance research in evidence-based practices and subsequent applications in mental health.

As director of Rutgers University's Behavioral Health and Sport Psychology, he is instrumental in advancing the integration of Psychology and Mental Health Awareness in the field of collegiate sports. Because of this, he was featured as resource person for promoting mental health awareness in collegiate and professional sports in news websites in New Jersey. He has been in the editorial board of the Journal of Clinical Sports Psychology since 2014, in addition to memberships to state and national psychology associations.

Aside from his published books and journal articles, Economou has also made appearances on Fox 5 NY as resource person in the topic of mental health, especially in relation to the recent COVID-19 pandemic, along with being interviewed by local news websites in connection with the effects of the COVID-19 pandemic in the mental health of citizens, students, and athletes.

He also teaches Zen Buddhism, after having studied at the Morning Star Zendo with Robert Kennedy Roshi. Economou hosts weekly “Meditation Mondays” mindfulness sessions for Rutgers student‑athletes, integrating Zen principles into performance psychology.

== Coaching and views ==
Through the Behavioral Health and Sport Psychology Department of Rutgers University, Economou also takes on the role of performance coaching, "providing Rutgers student-athletes with the tools to tackle mental challenges is as critical to their success as the physical support required to compete in the Big Ten Conference." He accumulated experience working with collegiate and professional athletes. He has been helping black athletes and their respective teams overcome racism and injustice. He emphasizes the need for professional leagues to have psychologists among the coaching staff, and the need for this movement of coaching with a focus on psychology and mental health to trickle down to the youth level.

In a 2024 New York Times article on sustaining a summer work routine, Economou discussed practices for preserving mental fitness during seasonal schedule shifts.

== Selected publications ==
=== Podcasts ===
- On Air with Dr. Pete (2023–present), a weekly mental‑health podcast he hosts across Apple Podcasts, Spotify and YouTube.
- When East Meets West (2020–present), co‑hosted with psychologist Nikki Rubin, blending Eastern mindfulness with Western behavioral science.

=== Articles ===
- Economou, P. J., & Gamble, A. (2024). "Navigating an Inter‑collegiate Athletes’ Transition Related to the Name, Image and Likeness (NIL) Interim Policy." Journal of Sport Psychology in Action. doi:10.1080/21520704.2024.2348153.
- Economou, Peter; Glascock, Tori; Gamble, Alexander, (2022) Black Student-Athletes and Racism Pandemic: Building Antiracist Practices in Athletics, Journal of Applied Sport Psychology. 1-18
- Economou, P; Glascock, V; Louie, M; Poliakova, P; Zuckerberg, W; (2021) COVID-19 and its Impact on Student-athlete Depression and Anxiety: The Return to Campus, The Sport Journal, 22(1), 1-7
- Economou, P; Glascock, T; Louie, M; (2021) The Impact of COVID-19 and the NCAA’S (National Collegiate Athletic Association) Season Cancellation on Sport Support Professionals, F1000 Research, vol 10, issue 775
- Economou, P; Farfan, M; Idirraga, A; Chafos, V; (2015) Modismos: Mindfulness and The Importance of Language with Latin American Clients, Vistas, American Counseling Association, Article 926.
- Economou, P; Chafos, V; Farfan, M; Idarraga M; (2015) Reducing Cravings: Implications for Treating Addictions Mindfully, Ideas and Research You Can Use: VISTAS, p. 1-7.
- Economou, P, (2011) Experiences of the White Gay Male: An Investigation of the Relationship Between Factors of Being Gay, Heterosexism, and the Stress Response System
- Chafos, V; Economou, P, (2014) Beyond Borderline Personality Disorder: The Mindful Brain, Social Work Journal. 59(4), 297–302, p. 297
- Palmer, L; Economou, P J; Cruz, D; Huntington, J; McLennon, S; Maris, M (2010) The Relationship Between Stress, Fatigue, and Cognitive Functioning, College Student Journal 47 (2): 312-325

=== Books ===
- Economou, P (2021) Meditation Journal for Anxiety: Daily Meditations, Prompts, and Practices for Finding Calm, Rockridge Press, Emeryville, CA. ISBN 979-8480018530
- Economou, P (2021) Mindfulness Working for Beginners: Exercises and Meditations to Relieve Stress, Find Joy, and Cultivate Gratitude, Rockridge Press, Emeryville, CA. ISBN 978-1648766121
