= John Valentin =

American baseball player (born 1967)

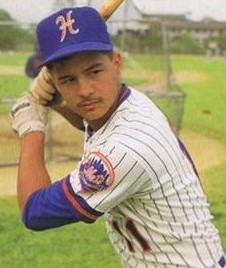
- Shortstop / Third baseman
- Born: February 18, 1967 (age 59); Mineola, New York, U.S.
- Batted: Right Threw: Right

MLB debut
- July 27, 1992, for the Boston Red Sox

Last MLB appearance
- September 29, 2002, for the New York Mets

MLB statistics
- Batting average: .279
- Home runs: 124
- Runs batted in: 558
- Stats at Baseball Reference

Teams
- Boston Red Sox (1992–2001); New York Mets (2002)

Career highlights and awards
- Silver Slugger Award (1995); Boston Red Sox Hall of Fame

John William Valentin (born February 18, 1967) is an American former shortstop and third baseman in Major League Baseball (MLB). He played for the Boston Red Sox from 1992 to 2001, and spent a final season with the New York Mets in 2002. He later became a coach for the Los Angeles Dodgers.

== Amateur career ==
Raised in Jersey City, New Jersey, Valentin attended St. Anthony High School, where he played baseball and basketball. He was teammates on the basketball team with David Rivers.

Valentin attended Seton Hall University, where he played college baseball for the Pirates under head coach Mike Sheppard. Valentin's teammates included future major leaguers Mo Vaughn and Craig Biggio. In 1988, he played collegiate summer baseball in the Cape Cod Baseball League for the Hyannis Mets. He was drafted by the Boston Red Sox in the 5th round of the 1988 MLB draft.

== Professional career ==
Valentin made his major-league debut as the starting shortstop against the Texas Rangers on July 27, 1992. He had one hit in four at-bats in his debut, with his first hit coming on a run batted in (RBI) single to short in the bottom of the 8th inning off of the Rangers' Terry Mathews. Valentin hit his first home run on August 22, 1992, off of Mike Schooler of the Seattle Mariners.

On July 8, 1994, Valentin executed the 10th unassisted triple play in major-league history, in a game against the Mariners. (Note: This game was also notable for being the major league debut of Alex Rodriguez.) Playing shortstop in the 6th inning, Valentin caught Marc Newfield's line drive, tagged second base before Mike Blowers could return to tag up, and tagged out Keith Mitchell who had left first base in an attempt to advance to second base.

Valentin's best season, statistically, was 1995, when he had a .298 batting average with 27 home runs, 37 doubles, 20 stolen bases and 81 walks. Valentin finished ninth in the American League MVP voting, and helped lead the Red Sox to its first division title since 1990. Valentin had a .971 fielding percentage in his first three years as a shortstop for the Red Sox.

On June 6, 1996, Valentin hit for the cycle. During the 1996 season, Red Sox prospect Nomar Garciaparra battled for the spot of shortstop with Valentin, who had held the position for his entire career. Garciaparra took over the shortstop position in 1997, forcing Valentin to play second base. Later that season, Valentin shifted to third base after the regular player at that position, Tim Naehring, was injured. Valentin spent four more seasons with the Red Sox; he played a total of only 30 games over his last two years in a Red Sox uniform, the 2000 and 2001 seasons.

Valentin signed with the New York Mets as a free agent after the 2001 season; he played in 114 games for them in 2002.

In 11 seasons with the Red Sox and Mets, Valentin had a .279 average and accumulated a total of 1093 hits. He hit 124 career home runs and had 558 RBIs.

Valentin is the only major-league player to have (in different games) executed an unassisted triple play, hit for the cycle, and hit three home runs in one game.

== Post-playing days ==
In January 2008, Valentin joined the Inland Empire 66ers of San Bernardino (the High-A minor league affiliate of the Los Angeles Dodgers) as hitting coach for the 2008 season. Shortly after accepting this assignment, manager Dave Collins resigned for personal reasons, and Valentin was promoted to manager of the 66ers. On Friday, October 31, 2008, he was named manager of the Chattanooga Lookouts of the Southern League (AA). After one season at the helm of the Lookouts he was demoted to hitting coach for the 2010 season. In 2011, he was promoted to the coaching staff of the AAA Albuquerque Isotopes. On November 13, 2012, he joined the Dodgers Major League staff as the Assistant Hitting Coach. In 2016, the Dodgers reassigned him as the hitting coach for the Class-A Great Lakes Loons of the Midwest League.

Valentin has been a resident of Holmdel Township, New Jersey. He owned the now-closed Julia's Restaurant in Atlantic Highlands, New Jersey.

== See also ==
- List of Major League Baseball annual doubles leaders
- List of Major League Baseball players to hit for the cycle

== Sources ==
- Grossman, Leigh (compiler). The Red Sox Fan Handbook. Pomfret, Connecticut: Swordsmith Books. ISBN 1-931013-03-9. Pgs. 180–181.
- Stout, Glenn and Johnson, Richard A. Red Sox Century. New York: Houghton Mifflin Company. ISBN 0-395-88417-9. Pg. 432.

Achievements
Preceded by John Mabry	Hitting for the cycle June 6, 1996	Succeeded by Alex Ochoa
