= Mike Moriarty =

American baseball player (born 1974)

- Shortstop / Second baseman
- Born: March 8, 1974 (age 51); Camden, New Jersey, U.S.
- Batted: Right Threw: Right

MLB debut
- April 11, 2002, for the Baltimore Orioles

Last MLB appearance
- May 4, 2002, for the Baltimore Orioles

MLB statistics
- Batting average: .188
- Runs: 0
- Hits: 3
- Stats at Baseball Reference

Teams
- Baltimore Orioles (2002)

Michael Thomas Moriarty (born March 8, 1974) is an American former professional baseball shortstop and second baseman. He played during one season in Major League Baseball (MLB) for the Baltimore Orioles.

== Career ==
Moriarty was born in Camden, New Jersey and played prep baseball at Bishop Eustace Preparatory School.

He attended Seton Hall University, where he played college baseball for the Pirates under head coach Mike Sheppard. In 1994, he played collegiate summer baseball with the Chatham A's of the Cape Cod Baseball League. He was drafted by the Minnesota Twins in the 7th round of the 1995 MLB draft. Moriarty played his first professional season with their Class A Fort Wayne Wizards in 1995, and split his last season, 2005, between the Triple-A clubs of Baltimore (Ottawa Lynx), Chicago Cubs (Iowa Cubs), and Boston Red Sox (Pawtucket Red Sox).

In 2016. Moriarty was listed as Northeast regional cross-checker on the scouting staff of the Seattle Mariners, based in Marlton, New Jersey.
