= John Morris (outfielder) =

American baseball player (born 1961)

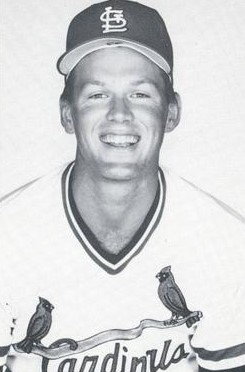
- Outfielder
- Born: February 23, 1961 (age 65); Freeport, New York, U.S.
- Batted: Left Threw: Left

MLB debut
- August 5, 1986, for the St. Louis Cardinals

Last MLB appearance
- August 5, 1992, for the California Angels

MLB statistics
- Batting average: .236
- Home runs: 8
- Runs batted in: 63
- Stats at Baseball Reference

Teams
- St. Louis Cardinals (1986–1990); Philadelphia Phillies (1991); California Angels (1992)

John Daniel Morris (born February 23, 1961) is an American former professional baseball outfielder, who played seven seasons in Major League Baseball (MLB) for the St. Louis Cardinals, Philadelphia Phillies, and California Angels.

== Amateur career ==
Morris attended Seton Hall University, where he played baseball for the Pirates under head coach Mike Sheppard. In 1981, Morris played collegiate summer baseball for the Wareham Gatemen of the Cape Cod Baseball League (CCBL). He batted .410 and set a league record for runs scored in a season. Morris was named the league's MVP, and was inducted into the CCBL Hall of Fame in 2007.

== Professional career ==
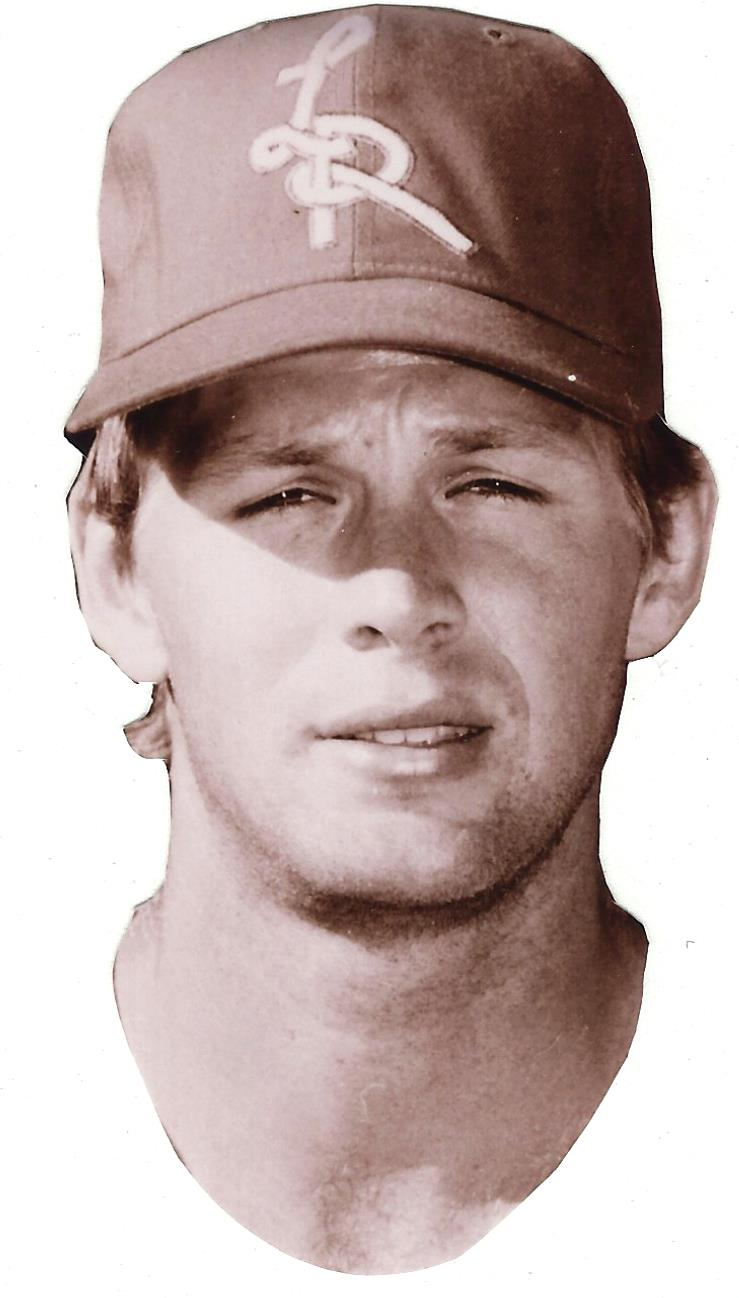
Morris with the Louisville Redbirds

Morris was drafted by the Kansas City Royals in the first round of the 1982 amateur draft. Morris won the 1983 Southern League Most Valuable Player Award. He played in the Royals organization until May 1985, when he was traded to the Cardinals for outfielder Lonnie Smith.

In 1988, after coming back from surgery for a ruptured disc, Morris was limited to 38 at-bats, for the Cardinals.

In 1991, while playing with the Philadelphia Phillies, Morris was mired in a 20-game hitless streak. On September 1, he entered the game in the eighth inning, as a pinch-runner, scoring the tying run and remaining in the game, playing center field. When Morris led off the 10th inning, Atlanta Braves relief pitcher Mark Wohlers, hardly knew what hit him: Morris came through, hitting a game-winning walk-off home run, leading the Phillies to a 5–4 victory.
