= Denis Masi =

Denis Masi (born 1942) is a British artist known for his experimental work which spans a broad range of media including assemblage, sculpture, installation, film, video, performance, photography, print, drawing and painting.

Masi's work is uniquely varied and has no particular stylistic form. The mediums he uses are driven by ideas. His work is concerned with a continuing interest in the shared human experience of questioning and resisting. It is both highly personal and polemic and investigates complex issues about power and especially power structures in society.

== Life and work ==
He studied at Seton Hall University in New Jersey, then went on to Brera Academy of Fine Art in Milan, Italy. He then completed postgraduate studies at Slade School of Fine Art and at Chelsea School of Art, London, UK. Masi has been an academic in the UK since 1968 until 2009. He currently lives and works in London.

Masi's work is held in major private and public collections in the UK and abroad, including in the Tate, in the V&A and he has work in the Bibliothèque Kandinsky in the Pompidou Centre, Paris. He has completed numerous public and corporate commissions as well as designs for the theatre. In 1984 Masi became the first artist in residence at the Imperial War Museum. He was then Sargant Fellow at The British School at Rome in 2003 and has had other residencies in Morocco (1994), Bulgaria (1995) and Iceland (2007).

Renowned British graphic designer Malcolm Garrett has worked closely with Masi on the design of his catalogues and communications.

In 2012 he collaborated with the charity Childline and BT to create a BT Artbox to celebrate the charity's 25th anniversary.

Masi's photography series Stories appeared in Issue 47 of Source in 2006.

== Past exhibitions ==
He has had numerous one-person exhibitions since 1965, in private and public galleries including the Arnolfini Gallery, Bristol (1976); ICA, London (1979 & 1984); The Third Eye Centre, Glasgow (1987) Serpentine Gallery, London (1988); Imperial War Museum, London (1988); Barbican Art Gallery, London (2003); KunstlerHaus, Bremen, Germany (1995); Culturgest, Lisbon, Portugal (1996); Museum of Santa Maria della Scala, Siena, Italy (2001); The Victoria and Albert Museum, London (2005), The Hafnarborg Institute of Culture and Fine Art, Hafnarfjordur, Iceland (2007); The European Foundation for Drawing, Meina, Italy (2008).
