= Rafael Novoa (baseball) =

American baseball player (born 1967)

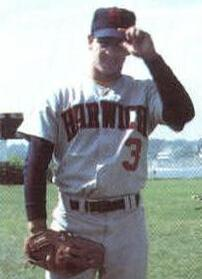
- Novoa with the Harwich Mariners in 1988
- Pitcher
- Born: October 26, 1967 (age 58); New York, New York, U.S.
- Batted: Left Threw: Left

MLB debut
- July 31, 1990, for the San Francisco Giants

Last MLB appearance
- October 3, 1993, for the Milwaukee Brewers

MLB statistics
- Win–loss record: 0–4
- Earned run average: 5.06
- Strikeouts: 31
- Stats at Baseball Reference

Teams
- San Francisco Giants (1990); Milwaukee Brewers (1993)

Rafael Angel Novoa (born October 26, 1967) is an American former Major League Baseball pitcher who played for the San Francisco Giants in 1990 and for the Milwaukee Brewers in 1993.

== Biography ==
A native of New York, New York, Novoa attended Fordham Preparatory School and played college baseball for Villanova, where he earned All-Tournament honors in the 1987 Big East Conference baseball tournament. In 1987 and 1988, he played collegiate summer baseball with the Harwich Mariners of the Cape Cod Baseball League.

He was drafted by the Giants in the 9th round of the 1989 amateur draft. Novoa played his first professional season with the Class A (Short Season) Everett Giants in 1989, and his last season in the California Angels' farm system in 1996.

Novoa never won a game at the major league level but on September 30, 1990, he was able to notch his one and only career save. He pitched the final four innings of a 8–2 Giants win over the arch rival Dodgers. He saved the game for starting pitcher Rick Reuschel. Ironically, this was the 214th and final victory of Reuschel's career.
