= Mo Vaughn =

American baseball player (born 1967)

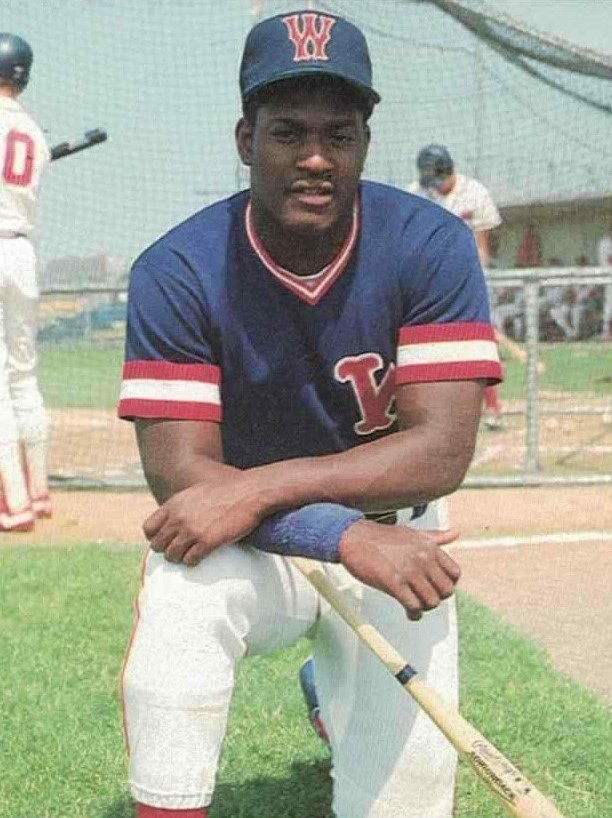
- Vaughn with the Wareham Gatemen in 1988
- First baseman
- Born: December 15, 1967 (age 58); Norwalk, Connecticut, U.S.
- Batted: Left Threw: Right

MLB debut
- June 27, 1991, for the Boston Red Sox

Last MLB appearance
- May 2, 2003, for the New York Mets

MLB statistics
- Batting average: .293
- Home runs: 328
- Runs batted in: 1,064
- Stats at Baseball Reference

Teams
- Boston Red Sox (1991–1998); Anaheim Angels (1999–2000); New York Mets (2002–2003)

Career highlights and awards
- 3× All-Star (1995, 1996, 1998); AL MVP (1995); Silver Slugger Award (1995); AL RBI leader (1995); Boston Red Sox Hall of Fame

Maurice Samuel Vaughn (born December 15, 1967), nicknamed "the Hit Dog", is an American former Major League Baseball first baseman who played for the Boston Red Sox, Anaheim Angels, and New York Mets from 1991 to 2003. He was a three-time All-Star selection and won the American League MVP award in 1995 with Boston.

== Early life and education ==
Vaughn attended New Canaan Country School in New Canaan, Connecticut. He played baseball for Trinity-Pawling School in Pawling, New York.

Vaughn played college baseball at Seton Hall for head coach Mike Sheppard. While there he set the single season school record for home runs with 28. In his three years at Seton Hall he hit a total of 57 home runs and 218 RBIs, both team records. His teammates included seven-time All-Star and Hall of Famer Craig Biggio, Red Sox teammate John Valentin, and Kevin Morton. Vaughn earned the Jack Kaiser Award as MVP of the 1987 Big East Conference baseball tournament while keying the Pirates' championship run.

While at Seton Hall, Vaughn played collegiate summer baseball for two years (1987–88) with the Wareham Gatemen of the Cape Cod Baseball League (CCBL), and in 2000 was named a member of the inaugural class of the CCBL Hall of Fame.

At Seton Hall, his brothers in Omega Psi Phi gave him the nickname "Hit Dog."

== Professional career ==
=== Boston Red Sox ===
Vaughn became the centerpiece of the Red Sox's line-up in 1993, hitting 29 home runs and contributing 101 RBIs. In 1995, he established a reputation as one of the most feared hitters in the American League when he hit 39 home runs with 126 RBIs and a .300 average. He also garnered 11 stolen bases. His efforts, which led the Red Sox to the playoffs (only to lose to the Cleveland Indians in the American League Division Series), were rewarded with the American League MVP award.

Vaughn had his career year with the Red Sox in 1996, playing in 161 games with a batting average of .326 and a career-high 44 home runs, 143 RBIs, 207 hits and 118 runs scored. On September 24, 1996, he hit three home runs against the Orioles, going 4–5 with five RBI in a 13–8 win. On April 15, 1997, MLB retired the number 42 to honor Jackie Robinson, but Vaughn was one of multiple players who were allowed to continue wearing the number for the rest of their careers. In a May 30, 1997, game against the Yankees, Vaughn went 4-for-4 with three solo homers in the Red Sox's 10–4 win.

Vaughn continued to improve over the next several seasons, batting .315 or higher from 1996 to 1998 and averaging 40 home runs and 118 RBIs. The Red Sox lost in the American League Division Series in 1998, once again to the Cleveland Indians, although Vaughn played well, hitting two home runs and driving in seven runs in game one.

He was noted for "crowding the plate"; his stance was such that his front elbow often appeared to be hovering in the strike zone, which intimidated pitchers into throwing outside pitches.

==== Last season with the Sox ====
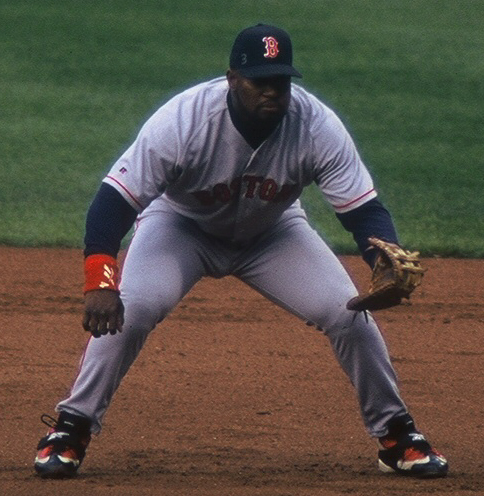
Vaughn playing first base with the Boston Red Sox in 1998

Though Vaughn's powerful personality and extensive charity work made him a popular figure in Boston, he had many issues with the Red Sox management and local media; his disagreements with Boston Globe sports columnist Will McDonough and Red Sox general manager Dan Duquette were particularly acute. As an outspoken clubhouse leader, Vaughn repeatedly stated that the concerned Sox administration did not want him around. Incidents in which he allegedly punched a man in the mouth outside of a nightclub and crashed his truck while returning home from a strip club in Providence led to further rifts with the administration.

Vaughn hit a walk-off grand slam in the ninth inning of Opening Day at Fenway Park against the Seattle Mariners in 1998. Vaughn was one half of a formidable middle of the lineup with shortstop Nomar Garciaparra. The two combined for 75 home runs in 1998, Vaughn's final year with the club. After the Cleveland Indians knocked Boston out of the playoffs in the first round, Vaughn became a free agent. Almost immediately, he signed a six-year, $80-million deal with the Anaheim Angels, the highest contract in the game at that time.

=== Anaheim Angels ===
While he hit well for Anaheim when he played—he hit 30-plus home runs and knocked in over 100 runs in both 1999 and 2000—Vaughn was plagued by injuries in 1999 and didn't play a single game in the 2001 season. He started his Anaheim career by falling down the visitor's dugout steps on his first play of his first game (trying to field a foul pop fly), badly spraining his ankle. Vaughn was nevertheless seen as a viable middle of the line-up producer before the 2002 season and was traded to the New York Mets for Kevin Appier on December 27, 2001.

Following Vaughn's departure from Anaheim, Angels closer Troy Percival took a shot at him, saying "We may miss Mo's bat, but we won't miss his leadership. Darin Erstad is our leader." This prompted the normally mild-mannered Vaughn to go off on a profanity-laced tirade, stating such statements as, "They ain't got no flags hanging at friggin' Edison Field, so the hell with them." The year after Vaughn left Anaheim, the Angels would reach and win the World Series.

=== New York Mets ===
With the Mets, Vaughn was counted upon to be a key catalyst in a revamped lineup that featured imports Roger Cedeño, Jeromy Burnitz, and Roberto Alomar. Vaughn got off to a slow start in 2002, and he was ridiculed in local sports columns and on sports talk radio shows for being out of shape; he weighed 268 pounds during his first season in New York. However, he hit his 300th career home run on April 3 against Pittsburgh Pirates starting pitcher Kip Wells and a game winning three-run home run in the 8th inning of a game on June 16 that gave the Mets a 3–2 win over the Yankees. He hit a memorable 505-foot home run at Shea Stadium (in the middle of the "Bud" sign on the Shea scoreboard) on June 26, and he finished the season with 26 home runs and 72 RBI.

In 2003, he played less than a month before knee problems ended the season for him. In January 2004, he announced that his knee problems would not allow him to play in the upcoming season. Vaughn's agent said that Vaughn was not announcing his retirement, but Vaughn acknowledged that he was unlikely to ever play again. At the time of his retirement, Vaughn was one of the two final players to wear the number 42 (and the last position player to do so), the other being Mariano Rivera (who retired in 2013).

== Career statistics ==
Over 12 seasons, Vaughn was in 1512 games played, compiling a .293 batting average (1620–5532) with 861 runs, 270 doubles, 328 home runs, 1064 RBI, 725 bases on balls, .383 on-base percentage and .523 slugging percentage. He had five consecutive seasons with a batting average greater than .300 (1994–98). In seven post-season games, he hit .226 (7–31) with 4 runs, 2 home runs and 7 RBI. His career fielding percentage was .988 as a first baseman.

== Personal life ==
In July 1995, Vaughn suffered an eye injury from a fight at a Boston nightclub which caused him to miss two games. No charges were filed or arrests made. In January 1998, Vaughn was arrested and charged with drunk driving after crashing into a disabled car on the side of the road and struggling with field sobriety tests in Norwood, Massachusetts. He was ultimately acquitted after a jury trial in March.

Vaughn became involved in various business ventures after his playing career. He became a managing director of Omni New York, LLC, which bought and rehabilitated 1,142 units of distressed housing in the New York metropolitan area and manages these properties to provide low cost housing with government tax credits. He purchased the Noble Drew Ali Plaza in Brownsville, Brooklyn for $21 million. He has also been involved in refurbishing the Whitney Young Manor in Yonkers, New York, a development first constructed by a company owned by fellow baseball player Jackie Robinson. Besides the New York metropolitan area, his company is also involved in projects in Cheyenne, Miami and Las Vegas. The company bought and refurbished the Sycamore Village complex in Lawrence, Massachusetts, outside Boston, in 2009. Vaughn also was the president of a trucking company (Mo Vaughn Transport) in Solon, Ohio. Vaughn sold the company in 2018.

On April 18, 2013, Vaughn bought an advertisement section of The Boston Globe to salute those who helped victims of the 2013 Patriots Day Bombing in Boston.

Vaughn became eligible for the National Baseball Hall of Fame in 2009. 75% of the vote was necessary for induction, and 5% was necessary to stay on the ballot. He received 1.1% of the vote and dropped off the ballot.

== Performance-enhancing drugs ==
On December 13, 2007, the report by Senator George J. Mitchell revealed that Vaughn purchased steroids or other performance-enhancing drugs from Kirk Radomski, who said he delivered the drugs to Vaughn personally. Radomski produced three checks, one for $2,200 and two more for $3,200, from Vaughn, one of the latter dated June 1, 2001, and another dated June 19, 2001. Radomski said the higher checks were for two kits of HGH, while the lower one was for one and a half kits. Vaughn's name, address and telephone number were listed in an address book seized from Radomski's house by federal agents. Vaughn's trainer instructed him to take HGH in attempt to recover from injury.

Mitchell requested a meeting with Vaughn to provide him information about these allegations and an opportunity to respond, but Vaughn did not agree to meet.

In 2025, Vaughn ultimately acknowledged that he took HGH for ongoing knee issues late in his career.

== See also ==
- List of Major League Baseball career home run leaders
- List of Major League Baseball career runs batted in leaders
- List of Major League Baseball annual runs batted in leaders
- List of Major League Baseball players named in the Mitchell Report

Preceded by Frank Thomas	American League Player of the Month; May 1996	Succeeded by Mark McGwire
