= Kevin Morton =

American baseball player (born 1968)

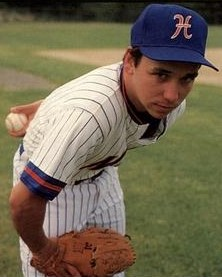
- Pitcher
- Born: August 3, 1968 (age 56); Norwalk, Connecticut, U.S.
- Batted: Right Threw: Left

MLB debut
- July 5, 1991, for the Boston Red Sox

Last MLB appearance
- October 3, 1991, for the Boston Red Sox

MLB statistics
- Win–loss record: 6–5
- Earned run average: 4.59
- Strikeouts: 45

CPBL statistics
- Win–loss record: 0–1
- Earned run average: 7.04
- Strikeouts: 3

Teams
- Boston Red Sox (1991); Sinon Bulls (1996)

Kevin Joseph Morton (born August 3, 1968) is an American former professional baseball pitcher. He played in Major League Baseball for the Boston Red Sox in 1991. He batted right-handed and threw left-handed.

== Amateur career ==
Morton graduated from Brien McMahon High School in 1986. He then attended Seton Hall University, where he played college baseball for the Pirates under head coach Mike Sheppard. In 1988, he played collegiate summer baseball with the Hyannis Mets of the Cape Cod Baseball League. In 1989, he was named Big East Pitcher of the Year as he posted an 11-2 record, with a 1.67 ERA and 100 strikeouts in 97 innings pitched. Morton was selected in the first round with the 29th overall pick by the Boston Red Sox in the 1989 amateur draft.

== Professional career ==
He made his major league debut on July 5, 1991 and pitched a complete game, beating the Detroit Tigers 10–1 at Fenway Park while striking out nine batters. He finished the season with the Red Sox with a 6–5 record and a total of 45 strikeouts in 86 1/3 innings.

Morton spent the rest of his professional career in the minor leagues, remaining in Boston's system with the Pawtucket Red Sox for the 1992 season before moving on to the New Britain Red Sox (Red Sox AA team) in 1993, the Norfolk Tides (New York Mets AAA team) in 1994, and the Iowa Cubs (Chicago Cubs AAA team) in 1995 before retiring. In the minors, he compiled an 11–33 record with four complete games and 254 strikeouts in 441 innings.
