= Territorial Cup Series =

Sports competition between the University of Arizona and Arizona State University

The Territorial Cup Series
Arizona (11)	Arizona State (6)
2009–10; 2010–11; 2011–12; 2012–13; 2017–18; 2019–20; 2020–21; 2022–23; 2023–24; 2024–25; 2025–26	2013–14; 2014–15; 2015–16; 2016–17; 2018–19; 2021–22

The Territorial Cup Series (also known as the Duel in the Desert Series) is the yearlong rivalry competition between the University of Arizona Wildcats (U of A) and the Arizona State University Sun Devils (ASU). The series began in 2009 with State Farm as the sponsor until 2012; the universities are seeking new sponsorship. Although without an official sponsor, media outlets and both universities continue to track and promote the series records.

The name comes from the Territorial Cup, the trophy that is awarded to the winner of the annual football game between the two schools. The 2023–24 series was the fifteenth and final year with both Universities as members of the Pac-12 Conference, as both schools moved to the Big 12 for the start of the 2024–25 academic year.

== History ==
At the beginning of the 2009–10 school year, the U of A and ASU decided to start a rivalry series, since they wanted to expand the football rivalry to all sports. Each academic year points would be awarded to the winning team or school at the conclusion of 18 rival sports competitions or series. The university with the most post would earn state bragging rights, as well as being awarded a new series trophy which would be held by the winning University until the completion of the following season.

From the start of 2009 until the end of the 2012 season the teams competed in 18 events that both Universities competed in at the Division 1 Level. Following the 2013 season the schools agreed to add two Men's & Women's events bringing the total to 20. The total increased to 21, with ASU adding Men's Tennis in 2018. The total increased again to 22, with U of A adding Women's triathlon in 2023.

Men's Events

- Baseball
- Basketball
- Cross Country
- Football
- Golf
- Indoor Track and Field
- Outdoor Track and Field
- Swimming and Diving
- Tennis

Women's Events

- Basketball
- Beach Volleyball
- Cross Country
- Golf
- Gymnastics
- Indoor Track and Field
- Outdoor Track and Field
- Soccer
- Softball
- Swimming and Diving
- Tennis
- Triathlon
- Volleyball

The first season, 2009–10 ended with Arizona winning in a 10.5–7.5 victory. In the second season, 2010–11 U of A would win its second in a row with an 11.5–6.5 victory. The third season & final season sponsored by State Farm, 2011–12, U of A would win the 3rd straight & by the largest margin in series history by a final of 12.5–5.5. In the 2012–13, Arizona would win its fourth consecutive Series title by a score of 9.5–8.5.

ASU would win their first title during the 2013–14 season with an 11.5–8.5 victory. During the 2014–15 season, ASU won their second series in a row with a final score of 12.5–7.5. ASU won their third straight title during the 2015–16 season again by the final tally of 12.5–7.5. With ASU earning points in: Men's Football, Cross Country, Golf, Baseball, Indoor Track & Field and Outdoor Track & Field, Women's Soccer, Volleyball(½), Cross Country, Basketball, Golf, Tennis and Indoor Track & Field In 2016–17, ASU tied the series record with a 4th win in a row by a margin of 10.5–9.5 with ASU earning points in: Men's Cross Country, Indoor Track & Field, Swimming & Diving, Golf and Outdoor Track & Field, Women's Volleyball(½), Basketball(½), Indoor Track & Field, Gymnastics, Beach Volleyball(½), Tennis and Outdoor Track & Field.

The following season 2017–18, U of A claimed its first victory since 2012 & 5th overall by a final score of 11–10. U of A would earn points in: Men's Cross Country, Basketball, Indoor Track & Field, Outdoor Track & Field & Baseball, Women's Volleyball, Cross Country, Soccer, Beach Volleyball, Softball & Golf.

ASU would reclaim the series in 2018–19 & their fifth overall win with the series ending in a 10.5–10.5 tie but ASU finished higher in the Directors' Cup 22nd to 39th. ASU earned points in: Football, Basketball, Baseball, Golf, Tennis. Women's Cross Country, Basketball(½), Swimming & Diving, Gymnastics, Tennis, and Outdoor Track & Field.

The 2019–20 season ended in bizarre fashion due to the COVID-19 pandemic, which cut all collegiate athletics short in March 2021 but U of A would recapture the series with its 6th overall win by leading the series 7.5–4.5. U of A earned points in: Men's Cross Country, Basketball(½), Swimming & Diving and Indoor Track & Field. Women's Cross Country, Soccer, Basketball, Indoor Track & Field. U of A would win their second series in a row & 7th overall during the 2020–21 season by a score of 10–9. U of A would earn points in: Men's Basketball, Cross Country, Baseball, Tennis & Golf. Women's Basketball(½), Indoor Track and Field, Cross Country, Beach Volleyball, Volleyball(½) & Soccer.

Arizona State won the series in the 2021–22 season, its 6th overall by a final score of 12.5–8.5. ASU would earn points in: Men's & Women's Cross Country, Football, Women's Basketball(½), Women's Gymnastics, Men's Swimming & Diving, Women's Beach Volleyball(½), Men's Indoor Track and Field, Women's Indoor Track and Field, Softball, Women's Tennis, Baseball(½), Men's Golf & Men's Outdoor Track and Field.

Arizona regained the series in the 2022–23 season, their 8th overall win by a final score of 11–10. Arizona would earn points in: Football, Men's & Women's Cross Country, Women's Volleyball (½), Women's Basketball, Men's Basketball (½), Softball, Women's Golf, Men's Tennis, Women's Indoor Track and Field, Men's & Women's Outdoor Track and Field.

Arizona would win for the second consecutive season and 9th overall by a final score of 12–10. Arizona would earn points in: football, Men's & Women's Cross Country, Soccer, Women's Basketball, Men's Basketball, Women's Indoor Track & Field (½), Men's Tennis, Softball, Women's Golf, Baseball (½), Men's & Women's Outdoor Track and Field.

Arizona won the overall season series for the third consecutive season and 10th overall by a final score of 14–8. Arizona earned points in: Soccer, Men's Cross Country, Women's Triathlon, Women's Gymnastics, Women's Basketball, Men's Basketball, Softball, Women's Tennis, Men's Tennis, Baseball, Women's Golf and Men’s and Women’s Outdoor Track & Field.

Arizona won the overall season series for the fourth consecutive season and 11th overall by a final score of 13.5–8. Arizona earned points in: Soccer(½), Men's & Women's Cross Country, Women's Triathlon, Football, Men's Basketball, Women's Gymnastics, Men's & Women's Indoor Track and Field, Softball, Men's Tennis, Men's Golf and Men's & Women's Indoor Track and Field.

== Point system ==
Points are awarded for all sports in which both schools maintain an intercollegiate team during the school year. Each sport is worth one point, which is awarded to the winner of the head-to-head match-up between the two teams. If the head-to-head match-up ends in a tie, each team receives half a point. In baseball and softball, all games, both conference and non-conference, count as one point combined. In swimming and diving, cross country, golf, and track and field, whichever team finishes higher in the standings at the Pac-12 championship receives one point. Should the two universities finish tied, the winner shall be decided by whichever school finishes higher in the Directors' Cup standings. If the teams finish in a tie in the Director Cup standings, the series will end in a tie.

== Trophy ==
The winner of the series receives a silver Territorial Cup Series trophy. One university must accumulate at least 11½ points or more to win the trophy outright. When the trophy is won, the logo of the winner is featured at the top of it. If U of A wins, a block “A” logo is placed on top of the trophy. If ASU wins the trophy, a “Sparky the Sun Devil” logo (not the ASU “pitchfork” logo) will be placed. If both schools finish tied at 11 points, the series ends in a tie and the school that finishes higher in Director's Cup Standings retains the trophy. The 2019–20 year was cut short in the wake of the COVID-19 outbreak, which resulted in the schools only playing in 12 of the 21 events. The 2020–21 season ASU Men's & Women's Swimming & Diving teams both opted out of the season, resulting in 2 fewer points & did not count towards final standings. Also during the 2020–21 season because of Covid travel restrictions, U of A & ASU Women's Gymnastics competed twice, each meet for ½ point.

== Yearly results ==
Arizona Leads the All-time series 11–6

School year	Winner	Total points	Director Cup Standings	Ref.
2009–10	Arizona	10½–7½	—	
2010–11	Arizona	11½–6½	—	
2011–12	Arizona	12½–5½	—	
2012–13	Arizona	9½–8½	—	
2013–14	Arizona State	11½–8½	—	
2014–15	Arizona State	12½–7½	—	
2015–16	Arizona State	12½–7½	—	
2016–17	Arizona State	10½–9½	—	
2017–18	Arizona	11–10	—	
2018–19	Arizona State	10½–10½†	U of A – 41st, ASU – 19th	
2019–20	Arizona	7½–4½‡	—	
2020–21	Arizona	10–9₳	—	
2021–22	Arizona State	11½–8½#	—	
2022–23	Arizona	11–10	—	
2023–24	Arizona	12–10	—	
2024–25	Arizona	14–8	—	
2025–26	Arizona	13½–8½	—	
2026–27	TBD	TBD		

- † ASU clinched victory due to higher finish in Directors' Cup standings.
- ‡ 2019–20 season was cut short due to the COVID-19 outbreak. Arizona was declared winner with the most points.
- ₳ 2020–21 season ASU Men's & Women's Swimming & Diving both opted out of the season, resulting in 2 fewer points.
- # 2021 Arizona State Football vacated win due to NCAA violations.

== Points by sport ==
Points by school
Sport	Arizona points	Arizona State points
Baseball	7	8
Men's Basketball	14	4
Women's Basketball	7	10
Beach Volleyball	6	6
Men's Cross Country	10	8
Women's Cross Country	12	6
Football	7	9
Men's Golf	4	12
Women's Golf	13	3
Gymnastics	7½	9½
Men's Indoor Track & Field	4½	8½
Women's Indoor Track & Field	9	8
Men's Outdoor Track & Field	9	7
Women's Outdoor Track & Field	9	7
Women's Soccer	10½	7½
Softball	10	6
Men's Swimming & Diving	9	7
Women's Swimming & Diving	9	7
Men's Tennis	6	2
Women's Tennis	3	13
Women's Triathlon	3	1
Women's Volleyball	9½	9½
All Sport Totals	179	159

== Current standings ==
=== 2026–27 schedule ===
Arizona victories	Arizona State victories

DATE	SPORT	LOCATION	Result	UA Points	ASU Points
October 15, 2026	Women's Volleyball	Desert Financial Arena • Tempe, AZ	UofA 1, ASU 3	0	½
October 30, 2026	Women's Soccer	Sun Devil Soccer Stadium • Tempe, AZ	UofA 0, ASU 1	0	1
October 31, 2026	Women's Cross Country (Big 12 Championship)	Greiner Family Cross Country Course • Stillwater, OK	UofA 7th (219), ASU 12th (325)	1	0
October 31, 2026	Men's Cross Country (Big 12 Championship)	Greiner Family Cross Country Course • Stillwater, OK	UofA 5th (163), ASU 7th (224)	1	0
November 8, 2026	Women's Triathlon (Collegiate Triathlon National Championship)	Tempe Town Lake • Tempe, AZ	UofA 1st, ASU 2nd	1	0
November 15, 2026	Women's Volleyball	Desert Financial Arena • Tempe, AZ	UofA 0, ASU 3	0	½
November 28, 2026	Football	Casino Del Sol Stadium • Tucson, AZ	UofA , ASU	0	0
January 16, 2027	Men's Basketball	McKale Center • Tucson, AZ	UofA , ASU	0	0
January 30, 2027	Women's Basketball	Desert Financial Arena • Tempe, AZ	UofA , ASU	0	0
February 12, 2027	Women's Gymnastics	Desert Financial Arena • Tempe, AZ	UofA , ASU	0	0
February 13, 2027	Men's Basketball	Desert Financial Arena • Tempe, AZ	UofA , ASU	0	0
February 23–27, 2027	Women's Swimming & Diving (Big 12 Championship)	Greensboro Aquatic Center • Greensboro, NC	UofA , ASU	0	0
February 23–27, 2027	Men's Swimming & Diving (Big 12 Championship)	Greensboro Aquatic Center • Greensboro, NC	UofA , ASU	0	0
February 28, 2027	Women's Basketball	McKale Center • Tucson, AZ	UofA , ASU	0	0
2027	Women's Beach Volleyball	Bear Down Beach • Tucson, AZ	UofA , ASU	0	0
2027	Women's Beach Volleyball	Sun Devil Beach Volleyball Facility • Tempe, AZ	UofA , ASU	0	0
March 12–13, 2027	Women's Indoor Track and Field (NCAA Championship)	Randal Tyson Track Center • Fayetteville, AR	UofA , ASU	0	0
March 12–13, 2027	Men's Indoor Track and Field (NCAA Championship)	Randal Tyson Track Center • Fayetteville, AR	UofA , ASU	0	0
2027	Women's Tennis	Lanelle Robson Tennis Center • Tucson, AZ	UofA , ASU	0	0
March 25–27, 2027	Softball	Hillenbrand Stadium • Tucson, AZ	UofA , ASU	0	0
March 25–27, 2027	Softball	Hillenbrand Stadium • Tucson, AZ	UofA , ASU	0	0
March 25–27, 2027	Softball	Hillenbrand Stadium • Tucson, AZ	UofA , ASU	0	0
2027	Men's Tennis	Whiteman Tennis Center • Tempe, AZ	UofA , ASU	0	0
March 30, 2027	Baseball	Hi Corbett Field • Tucson, AZ	UofA , ASU	0	0
April 16–18, 2027	Baseball	Phoenix Municipal Stadium • Tempe, AZ	UofA , ASU	0	0
April 16–18, 2027	Baseball	Phoenix Municipal Stadium • Tempe, AZ	UofA , ASU	0	0
April 16–18, 2027	Baseball	Phoenix Municipal Stadium • Tempe, AZ	UofA , ASU	0	0
April 21–23, 2027	Women's Golf (Big 12 Championship)	Las Vegas Country Club • Winchester, NV	UofA , ASU	0	0
April 26–28, 2027	Men's Golf (Big 12 Championship)	The Covey at Big Easy Ranch • Columbus, TX	UofA , ASU	0	0
May 13–15, 2027	Men's Outdoor Track & Field (Big 12 Championship)	R.V. Christian Track • Manhattan, KS	UofA , ASU	0	0
May 13–15, 2027	Women's Outdoor Track & Field (Big 12 Championship)	R.V. Christian Track • Manhattan, KS	UofA , ASU	0	0
TOTALS:				3	2

== Previous standings ==
=== 2025–26 schedule ===
Arizona – 13½	Arizona State – 8½

DATE	SPORT	LOCATION	Result	UA Points	ASU Points
October 25, 2025	Women's Volleyball	McKale Center • Tucson, AZ	UofA 1, ASU 3	0	½
October 30, 2025	Women's Soccer	Murphey Field at Mulcahy Soccer Stadium • Tucson, AZ	UofA 0, ASU 0	½	½
October 31, 2025	Women's Cross Country (Big 12 Championship)	Rim Rock Farm • Lawrence, KS	UofA 15th (407), ASU 16th (496)	1	0
October 31, 2025	Men's Cross Country (Big 12 Championship)	Rim Rock Farm • Lawrence, KS	UofA 8th (214), ASU 12th (343)	1	0
November 8, 2025	Women's Triathlon (Collegiate Triathlon National Championship)	Arizona State Campus • Tempe, AZ	UofA 1st, ASU 2nd	1	0
November 13, 2025	Women's Volleyball	Desert Financial Arena • Tempe, AZ	UofA 1, ASU 3	0	½
November 28, 2025	Football	Sun Devil Stadium • Tempe, AZ	UofA 23, ASU 7	1	0
January 14, 2026	Men's Basketball	McKale Center • Tucson, AZ	UofA 89, ASU 82	½	0
January 28, 2026	Women's Basketball	Desert Financial Arena • Tempe, AZ	UofA 61, ASU 68	0	½
January 31, 2026	Men's Basketball	Desert Financial Arena • Tempe, AZ	UofA 87, ASU 74	½	0
February 14, 2026	Women's Basketball	McKale Center • Tucson, AZ	UofA 69, ASU 75 ^{OT}	0	½
February 27, 2026	Women's Beach Volleyball	Bear Down Beach • Tucson, AZ	UofA 0, ASU 5	0	½
February 24−28, 2026	Women's Swimming & Diving (Big 12 Championship)	Greensboro Aquatic Center • Greensboro, NC	UofA 2nd (1442.5), ASU 1st (1660.5)	0	1
February 24−28, 2026	Men's Swimming & Diving (Big 12 Championship)	Greensboro Aquatic Center • Greensboro, NC	UofA 2nd (1552.5), ASU 1st (1898.5)	0	1
March 6, 2026	Women's Beach Volleyball	Sun Devil Beach Volleyball Facility • Tempe, AZ	UofA 2, ASU 3	0	½
March 6, 2026	Women's Gymnastics	McKale Center • Tucson, AZ	UofA 196.400, ASU 196.000	1	0
March 13−14, 2026	Women's Indoor Track and Field (NCAA Championship)	Randal Tyson Track Center • Fayetteville, AR	UofA 4 (37th), ASU 0 (56th)	1	0
March 13−14, 2026	Men's Indoor Track and Field (NCAA Championship)	Randal Tyson Track Center • Fayetteville, AR	UofA 1 (52nd), ASU 0 (53rd)	1	0
March 14, 2026	Women's Tennis	Whiteman Tennis Center • Tempe, AZ	UofA 2, ASU 4	0	1
March 20−22, 2026	Softball	Hillenbrand Stadium • Tucson, AZ	UofA 5, ASU 16 ^{(5 inn.)}	1	0
March 20−22, 2026	Softball	Hillenbrand Stadium • Tucson, AZ	UofA 9, ASU 8	1	0
March 20−22, 2026	Softball	Hillenbrand Stadium • Tucson, AZ	UofA 6, ASU 4	1	0
March 28, 2026	Men's Tennis	Lanelle Robson Tennis Center • Tucson, AZ	UofA 4, ASU 0	1	0
March 10, 2026	Baseball	Phoenix Municipal Stadium • Tempe, AZ	UofA 4, ASU 10	0	1
April 2−4, 2026	Baseball	Hi Corbett Field • Tucson, AZ	UofA 4, ASU 6	0	1
April 2−4, 2026	Baseball	Hi Corbett Field • Tucson, AZ	UofA 7, ASU 4	0	1
April 2−4, 2026	Baseball	Hi Corbett Field • Tucson, AZ	UofA 6, ASU 15	0	1
April 13, 2026	Baseball	Phoenix Municipal Stadium • Tempe, AZ	UofA 5, ASU 3	0	1
April 24−26, 2026	Women's Golf (Big 12 Championship)	Dallas Athletic Club • Dallas, TX	UofA 11th (904), ASU T–4th (874)	0	1
April 27−29, 2026	Men's Golf (Big 12 Championship)	Prairie Dunes • Hutchinson, KS	UofA 2nd (1,150), ASU 9th (1,173)	1	0
May 15−17, 2026	Men's Outdoor Track & Field (Big 12 Championship)	Drachman Stadium • Tucson, AZ	UofA 2nd (101), ASU 9th (39)	1	0
May 15−17, 2026	Women's Outdoor Track & Field (Big 12 Championship)	Drachman Stadium • Tucson, AZ	UofA 3rd (79), ASU 11th (0)	1	0
TOTALS:				13½	8½

=== 2024–25 schedule ===
Arizona – 14	Arizona State – 8

DATE	SPORT	LOCATION	Result	UA Points	ASU Points
October 9, 2024	Women's Volleyball	Desert Financial Arena • Tempe, AZ	UofA 1, ASU 3	0	½
October 24, 2024	Women's Volleyball	McKale Center • Tucson, AZ	UofA 1, ASU 3	0	½
October 25, 2024	Women's Soccer	Sun Devil Soccer Stadium • Tempe, AZ	UofA 1, ASU 0	1	0
November 1, 2024	Women's Cross Country (Big 12 Championship)	Cottonwood Creek Golf Course • Waco, TX	UofA 16th(316), ASU 9th(463)	0	1
November 1, 2024	Men's Cross Country (Big 12 Championship)	Cottonwood Creek Golf Course • Waco, TX	UofA 9th(280), ASU 12th (318)	1	0
November 9, 2024	Women's Triathlon (Collegiate Triathlon National Championship)	Lake Louisa State Park • Clermont, FL	UofA 1st (942), ASU 2nd (920)	1	0
November 30, 2024	Football	Arizona Stadium • Tucson, AZ	UofA 7, ASU 49	0	1
January 26, 2025	Women's Gymnastics	Desert Financial Arena • Tempe, AZ	UofA 196.650, ASU 195.750	1	0
February 1, 2025	Men's Basketball	Desert Financial Arena • Tempe, AZ	UofA 81, ASU 72	½	0
February 8, 2025	Women's Basketball	McKale Center • Tucson, AZ	UofA 66, ASU 59	½	0
February 25−March 1, 2025	Women's Swimming & Diving (Big 12 Championship)	Weyerhaeuser King County Aquatic Center • Federal Way, WA	UofA 1,240 (2nd), ASU 1,695 (1st)	0	1
February 26−March 1, 2025	Men's Swimming & Diving (Big 12 Championship)	Weyerhaeuser King County Aquatic Center • Federal Way, WA	UofA 1,301 (2nd), ASU 1,912 (1st)	0	1
March 1, 2025	Women's Basketball	Desert Financial Arena • Tempe, AZ	UofA 71, ASU 60	½	0
March 4, 2025	Men's Basketball	McKale Center • Tucson, AZ	UofA 113, ASU 100	½	0
March 14−15, 2025	Women's Indoor Track and Field (NCAA Championship)	Virginia Beach Sports Center • Virginia Beach, VA	UofA 5 (35th), ASU 0 (61st)	1	0
March 14−15, 2025	Men's Indoor Track and Field (NCAA Championship)	Virginia Beach Sports Center • Virginia Beach, VA	UofA 0 (56th), ASU 11 (24th)	0	1
March 21–23, 2025	Softball	Farrington Stadium • Tempe, AZ	UofA 6, ASU 1	1	0
March 21–23, 2025	Softball	Farrington Stadium • Tempe, AZ	UofA 5, ASU 1	1	0
March 21–23, 2025	Softball	Farrington Stadium • Tempe, AZ	UofA 2, ASU 3	1	0
March 26, 2025	Women's Beach Volleyball	Sun Devil Beach Volleyball Facility • Tempe, AZ	UofA 0, ASU 5	0	½
March 29, 2025	Women's Tennis	Lanelle Robson Tennis Center • Tucson, AZ	UofA 4, ASU 3	1	0
April 4, 2025	Women's Beach Volleyball	Bear Down Beach • Tucson, AZ	UofA 1, ASU 4	0	½
March 11, 2025	Baseball	Hi Corbett Field • Tucson, AZ	UofA 3, ASU 2	1	0
April 4–6, 2025	Baseball	Phoenix Municipal Stadium • Tempe, AZ	UofA 8, ASU 5	1	0
April 4–6, 2025	Baseball	Phoenix Municipal Stadium • Tempe, AZ	UofA 5, ASU 3	1	0
April 4–6, 2025	Baseball	Phoenix Municipal Stadium • Tempe, AZ	UofA 4, ASU 8	1	0
April 12, 2025	Men's Tennis	Whiteman Tennis Center • Tempe, AZ	UofA 4, ASU 0	1	0
April 15−17, 2025	Women's Golf (Big 12 Championship)	Houston Oaks Country Club • Hockley, TX	UofA 1st (871), ASU T-2nd(871)†	1	0
April 22−24, 2025	Men's Golf (Big 12 Championship)	Southern Hills Country Club • Tulsa, OK	UofA 12th (1,173), ASU 2nd (1,129)	0	1
May 15−17, 2025	Men's Outdoor Track & Field (Big 12 Championship)	Rock Chalk Park • Lawrence, KS	UofA 8th (48), ASU 10th (40)	1	0
May 15−17, 2025	Women's Outdoor Track & Field (Big 12 Championship)	Rock Chalk Park • Lawrence, KS	UofA 8th (46), ASU 15th (11)	1	0
TOTALS:				14	8

Notes: † Arizona won 2025 Women's Big 12 Conference Championship via playoff

=== 2023–24 schedule ===
Arizona – 12	Arizona State – 10

DATE	SPORT	LOCATION	Result	UA Points	ASU Points
September 21, 2023	Women's Volleyball	Mullett Arena • Tempe, AZ	UofA 0, ASU 3	0	½
October 27, 2023	Women's Cross Country (Pac-12 Championship)	Chambers Bay Golf Course • University Place, WA	UofA 10th (296), ASU 12th (351)	1	0
October 27, 2023	Men's Cross Country (Pac-12 Championship)	Chambers Bay Golf Course • University Place, WA	UofA 5th (143), ASU 9th (234)	1	0
November 3, 2023	Women's Soccer	Murphey Field at Mulcahy Soccer Stadium • Tucson, AZ	UofA 2, ASU 1	1	0
November 11, 2023	Women's Triathlon	Arizona State Campus • Tempe, AZ	UofA 5th (917), ASU 1st (999)	0	1
November 25, 2023	Football	Mountain America Stadium • Tempe, AZ	UofA 59, ASU 23	1	0
November 25, 2023	Women's Volleyball	McKale Center • Tucson, AZ	UofA 0, ASU 3	0	½
December 17, 2023	Women's Basketball	Desert Financial Arena • Tempe, AZ	UofA 91, ASU 52	½	0
February 4, 2024	Women's Basketball	McKale Center • Tucson, AZ	UofA 63, ASU 49	½	0
February 15, 2024	Women's Gymnastics	McKale Center • Tucson, AZ	UofA 196.250, ASU 196.850	0	1
February 17, 2024	Men's Basketball	McKale Center • Tucson, AZ	UofA 105, ASU 60	½	0
February 28, 2024	Men's Basketball	Desert Financial Arena • Tempe, AZ	UofA 85, ASU 67	½	0
February 28–March 2, 2024	Women's Swimming & Diving (Pac-12 Championship)	Weyerhaeuser King County Aquatic Center • Federal Way, WA	UofA 7th (514), ASU 5th (990.5)	0	1
March 6–9, 2024	Men's Swimming & Diving (Pac-12 Championship)	Weyerhaeuser King County Aquatic Center • Federal Way, WA	UofA 4th (433), ASU 1st (1036)	0	1
March 8–9, 2024	Women's Indoor Track and Field (Pac-12 Championship)	The New Balance Track • Boston, MA	UofA DNF, ASU DNF	½	½
March 8–9, 2024	Men's Indoor Track and Field (Pac-12 Championship)	The New Balance Track • Boston, MA	UofA DNF, ASU 24th (10)	0	1
April 7, 2024	Men's Tennis	Lanelle Robson Tennis Center • Tucson, AZ	UofA 4, ASU 2	1	0
April 20, 2024	Women's Tennis	Whiteman Tennis Center • Tempe, AZ	UofA 3, ASU 4	0	1
April 19–21	Softball	Hillenbrand Stadium • Tucson, AZ	UofA 3, ASU 2	1	0
April 19–21	Softball	Hillenbrand Stadium • Tucson, AZ	UofA 13, ASU 3	1	0
April 19–21	Softball	Hillenbrand Stadium • Tucson, AZ	UofA 9, ASU 8	1	0
April 21–23, 2024	Women's Golf (Pac-12 Championship)	Palouse Ridge Golf Club • Pullman, WA	UofA 6th (868), ASU 7th (869)	1	0
March 29, April 18 & 25, 2024	Women's Beach Volleyball (Pac-12 Championship)	Sun Devil Beach Volleyball Facility • Tempe, AZ	UofA 2, ASU 3	0	1
March 29, April 18 & 25, 2024	Women's Beach Volleyball (Pac-12 Championship)	Bear Down Beach • Tucson, AZ	UofA 3, ASU 2	0	1
March 29, April 18 & 25, 2024	Women's Beach Volleyball (Pac-12 Championship)	Sun Devil Beach Volleyball Facility • Tempe, AZ	UofA 0, ASU 3	0	1
March 15–17, 2024	Baseball	Hi Corbett Field • Tucson, AZ	UofA 2, ASU 3	½	½
March 15–17, 2024	Baseball	Hi Corbett Field • Tucson, AZ	UofA 0, ASU 4	½	½
March 15–17, 2024	Baseball	Hi Corbett Field • Tucson, AZ	UofA 14, ASU 3	½	½
May 7, 2024	Baseball	Phoenix Municipal Stadium • Tempe, AZ	UofA 5, ASU 3	½	½
April 26–28, 2024	Men's Golf (Pac-12 Championship)	Desert Forest Golf Club • Carefree, AZ	UofA 9th (1495), ASU 1st (1447)	0	1
May 10–12, 2024	Men's Outdoor Track & Field (Pac-12 Championship)	Potts Field • Boulder, CO	UofA T-6 (60), ASU T-9th (33)	1	0
May 10–12, 2024	Women's Outdoor Track & Field (Pac-12 Championship)	Potts Field • Boulder, CO	UofA T-6 (66), ASU T-9th (50)	1	0
TOTALS:				12	10

=== 2022–23 schedule ===
Arizona – 11	Arizona State – 10

DATE	SPORT	LOCATION	Result	UA Points	ASU Points
September 21, 2022	Women's Volleyball	McKale Center • Tucson, AZ	UofA 1, ASU 3	0	½
October 28, 2022	Women's Cross Country (Pac-12 Championship)	UC Riverside Agricultural Operations Course • Riverside, CA	UofA 9th(256), ASU 11th(314)	1	0
October 28, 2022	Men's Cross Country (Pac-12 Championship)	UC Riverside Agricultural Operations Course • Riverside, CA	UofA 7th(213), ASU 8th(222)	1	0
November 4, 2022	Women's Soccer	Sun Devil Soccer Stadium • Tempe, AZ	UofA 2, ASU 3	0	1
November 25, 2022	Football	Arizona Stadium • Tucson, AZ	UofA 38, ASU 35	1	0
November 26, 2022	Women's Volleyball	Desert Financial Arena • Tempe, AZ	UofA 3, ASU 2	½	0
December 29, 2022	Women's Basketball	McKale Center • Tucson, AZ	UofA 84, ASU 66	½	0
December 31, 2022	Men's basketball	Desert Financial Arena • Tempe, AZ	UofA 69, ASU 60	½	0
January 22, 2023	Women's Basketball	Desert Financial Arena • Tempe, AZ	UofA 80, ASU 67	½	0
January 28, 2023	Women's Gymnastics	Desert Financial Arena • Tempe, AZ	UofA 196.475, ASU 196.800	0	1
February 25, 2023	Men's basketball	McKale Center • Tucson, AZ	UofA 88, ASU 89	0	½
February 22–25, 2023	Women's Swimming & Diving (Pac-12 Championship)	Weyerhaeuser King County Aquatic Center • Federal Way, WA	UofA 6th(607), ASU 5th(837)	0	1
March 1–4, 2023	Men's Swimming & Diving (Pac-12 Championship)	Weyerhaeuser King County Aquatic Center • Federal Way, WA	UofA 4th(323), ASU 1st(897.5)	0	1
March 10–11, 2023	Women's Indoor Track and Field (Pac-12 Championship)	Albuquerque Convention Center • Albuquerque, NM	UofA 43rd (2), ASU DNF	1	0
March 10–11, 2023	Men's Indoor Track and Field (Pac-12 Championship)	Albuquerque Convention Center • Albuquerque, NM	UofA 23rd (10), ASU 19th (11)	0	1
March 10–12, 2023	Softball	Farrington Stadium • Tempe, AZ	UofA 9, ASU 0	1	0
March 10–12, 2023	Softball	Farrington Stadium • Tempe, AZ	UofA 11, ASU 0	1	0
March 10–12, 2023	Softball	Farrington Stadium • Tempe, AZ	UofA 3, ASU 4	1	0
March 29, 2023	Women's Beach Volleyball	Sun Devil Beach Volleyball Facility • Tempe, AZ	UofA 2, ASU 3	0	½
March 24–26, 2023	Baseball	Phoenix Municipal Stadium • Tempe, AZ	UofA 5, ASU 6	0	1
March 24–26, 2023	Baseball	Phoenix Municipal Stadium • Tempe, AZ	UofA 4, ASU 7	0	1
March 24–26, 2023	Baseball	Phoenix Municipal Stadium • Tempe, AZ	UofA 6, ASU 10	0	1
April 19, 2023	Baseball	Hi Corbett Field • Tucson, AZ	UofA 20, ASU 0	0	1
April 17–19, 2023	Women's Golf (Pac-12 Championship)	Papago Golf Club • Phoenix, AZ	UofA 865(4th), ASU 871(5th)	1	0
April 21, 2023	Women's Beach Volleyball	Bear Down Beach • Tucson, AZ	UofA 2, ASU 3	0	½
April 22, 2023	Men's Tennis	Whiteman Tennis Center • Tempe, AZ	UofA 4, ASU 2	1	0
April 22, 2023	Women's Tennis	Lanelle Robson Tennis Center • Tucson, AZ	UofA 0, ASU 4	0	1
April 28–30, 2023	Men's Golf (Pac-12 Championship)	Stanford Golf Course • Stanford, CA	UofA 7th (1414), ASU 2nd (1394)	0	1
May 12–14, 2023	Men's Outdoor Track & Field (Pac-12 Championship)	Walnut, CA • Hilmer Lodge Stadium	UofA 5th(76), ASU 7th(66)	1	0
May 12–14, 2023	Women's Outdoor Track & Field (Pac-12 Championship)	Walnut, CA • Hilmer Lodge Stadium	UofA 10th(39), ASU 11th(31)	1	0
TOTALS:				11	10

=== 2021–22 schedule ===
Arizona – 8½	Arizona State – 12½

DATE	SPORT	LOCATION	Result	UA Points	ASU Points
September 23, 2021	Women's Volleyball	Desert Financial Arena • Tempe, AZ	UofA 3, ASU 2	½	0
October 29, 2021	Women's Cross Country (Pac-12 Championship)	Regional Athletic Complex • Salt Lake City, UT	UofA 12th (343), ASU 10th (299)	0	1
October 29, 2021	Men's Cross Country (Pac-12 Championship)	Regional Athletic Complex • Salt Lake City, UT	UofA 9th (280), ASU 7th (205)	0	1
November 5, 2021	Women's Soccer	Murphey Field at Mulcahy Soccer Stadium • Tucson, AZ	UofA 2, ASU 1	1	0
November 27, 2021	Football	Sun Devil Stadium • Tempe, AZ	UofA 15, ASU 38†	0	0
November 27, 2021	Women's Volleyball	McKale Center • Tucson, AZ	UofA 3, ASU 0	½	0
January 29, 2022	Men's basketball	McKale Center • Tucson, AZ	UofA 67, ASU 56	½	0
February 7, 2022	Men's Basketball	Desert Financial Arena • Tempe, AZ	UofA 91, ASU 79	½	0
February 11, 2022	Women's Basketball	Desert Financial Arena • Tempe, AZ	UofA 77, ASU 81	0	½
February 12, 2022	Women's Gymnastics	McKale Center • Tucson, AZ	UofA 196.400, ASU 196.600	0	1
February 13, 2022	Women's Basketball	McKale Center • Tucson, AZ	UofA 62, ASU 58	½	0
February 23–26, 2022	Women's Swimming & Diving (Pac-12 Championship)	Hillenbrand Aquatic Center • Tucson, AZ	UofA 750.5(5th), ASU 669(6th)	1	0
March 2–5, 2022	Men's Swimming & Diving (Pac-12 Championship)	Weyerhaeuser King County Aquatic Center • Federal Way, WA	UofA 423.5(5th), ASU 652(3rd)	0	1
March 8, 2022	Women's Beach Volleyball	Sun Devil Beach Volleyball Facility • Tempe, AZ	UofA 2, ASU 3	0	½
March 11–12, 2022	Women's Indoor Track and Field (Pac-12 Championship)	Birmingham CrossPlex • Birmingham, AL	UofA 5(33rd), ASU 18(18th)	0	1
March 11–12, 2022	Men's Indoor Track and Field (Pac-12 Championship)	Birmingham CrossPlex • Birmingham, AL	UofA 6(35th), ASU 16(15th)	0	1
March 25–27, 2022	Softball	Hillenbrand Stadium • Tucson, AZ	UofA 2, ASU 9	0	1
March 25–27, 2022	Softball	Hillenbrand Stadium • Tucson, AZ	UofA 0, ASU 11	0	1
March 25–27, 2022	Softball	Hillenbrand Stadium • Tucson, AZ	UofA 0, ASU 8	0	1
March 26, 2022	Men's Tennis	Lanelle Robson Tennis Center • Tucson, AZ	UofA 4, ASU 0	1	0
March 27, 2022	Women's Beach Volleyball	Bear Down Beach • Tucson, AZ	UofA 3, ASU 2	½	0
April 16, 2022	Women's Tennis	Whiteman Tennis Center • Tempe, AZ	UofA 1, ASU 4	0	1
April 18–20, 2022	Women's Golf (Pac-12 Championship)	Eugene Country Club • Eugene, OR	UofA 884 (6th), ASU 888 (7th)	1	0
April 5, 2022	Baseball	Phoenix Municipal Stadium • Tempe, AZ	UofA 6, ASU 10	½	½
April 22–24, 2022	Baseball	Hi Corbett Field • Tucson, AZ	UofA 7, ASU 6	½	½
April 22–24, 2022	Baseball	Hi Corbett Field • Tucson, AZ	UofA 5, ASU 8	½	½
April 22–24, 2022	Baseball	Hi Corbett Field • Tucson, AZ	UofA 14, ASU 4	½	½
April 25–27, 2022	Men's Golf (Pac-12 Championship)	Aldarra Golf Club • Sammamish, WA	UofA 11th(1476), ASU 3rd(1430)	0	1
May 13–15, 2022	Men's Outdoor Track & Field (Pac-12 Championship)	Hayward Field • Eugene, OR	UofA 10th(27), ASU 5th(88)	0	1
May 13–15, 2022	Women's Outdoor Track & Field (Pac-12 Championship)	Hayward Field • Eugene, OR	UofA 7th(60), ASU 8th(57)	1	0
TOTALS:				8½	11½

Notes: † Arizona State vacated 2021 win due to NCAA violations.

=== 2020–21 schedule ===
Arizona – 10	Arizona State – 9

DATE	SPORT	LOCATION	Result	UA Points	ASU Points
December 10, 2020	Women's Basketball	McKale Center • Tucson, AZ	UofA 65, ASU 37	½	0
December 11, 2020	Football	Arizona Stadium • Tucson, AZ	UofA 7, ASU 70	0	1
January 21, 2021	Men's basketball	Desert Financial Arena • Tempe, AZ	UofA 84, ASU 82	½	0
January 25, 2021	Men's basketball	McKale Center • Tucson, AZ	UofA 80, ASU 67	½	0
February 24, 2021	Women's Gymnastics	Desert Financial Arena • Tempe, AZ	UofA 194.750, ASU 197.450	0	½
Feb. 24–27, 2021	Women's Swimming & Diving (Pac-12 Championship)	Houston Recreation Center (Swimming) • Houston, TX & Hillenbrand Aquatic Center • Tucson, AZ (Diving)	UofA 6th(827), ASU DNF(0)	1*	0
Feb. 24 – Mar. 3, 2021	Men's Swimming & Diving (Pac-12 Championship)	Houston Recreation Center (Swimming) • Houston, TX & Hillenbrand Aquatic Center • Tucson, AZ (Diving)	UofA 3rd(644), ASU DNF(0)	1*	0
Feb. 25–27, 2021	Women's Indoor Track and Field (Pac-12 Championship)	Cadet Field House • Colorado Springs, CO	UofA T–20th(10), ASU T–29th(6)	1	0
Feb. 25–27, 2021	Men's Indoor Track and Field (Pac-12 Championship)	Cadet Field House • Colorado Springs, CO	UofA 25th(8), ASU T–18th(10)	0	1
February 28, 2021	Women's Basketball	Desert Financial Arena • Tempe, AZ	UofA 64, ASU 66	0	½
March 5, 2021	Women's Cross Country (Pac-12 Championship)	Chambers Creek Park • Tacoma, WA	UofA 8th(200), ASU 9th(276)	1	0
March 5, 2021	Men's Cross Country (Pac-12 Championship)	Chambers Creek Park • Tacoma, WA	UofA 8th(201), ASU 9th(233)	1	0
March 5, 2021	Women's Volleyball	McKale Center • Tucson, AZ	UofA 3, ASU 0	½	0
March 6, 2021	Women's Gymnastics	Desert Financial Arena • Tempe, AZ	UofA 196.075, ASU 196.100	0	½
March 7, 2021	Women's Volleyball	Desert Financial Arena • Tempe, AZ	UofA 2, ASU 3	0	½
March 19, 2021	Women's Soccer	Murphey Field at Mulcahy Soccer Stadium • Tucson, AZ	UofA 1, ASU 0	½	0
March 28, 2021	Women's Beach Volleyball	Bear Down Beach • Tucson, AZ	UofA 4, ASU 1	½	0
April 1, 2021	Baseball	Phoenix Municipal Stadium • Phoenix, AZ	UofA 10, ASU 5	1	0
April 2, 2021	Baseball	Phoenix Municipal Stadium • Phoenix, AZ	UofA 7, ASU 6	1	0
April 3, 2021	Baseball	Phoenix Municipal Stadium • Phoenix, AZ	UofA 2, ASU 3	1	0
April 6, 2021	Baseball	Hi Corbett Field • Tucson, AZ	UofA 14, ASU 2	1	0
April 16, 2021	Women's Soccer	Sun Devil Soccer Stadium • Tempe, AZ	UofA 2, ASU 0	½	0
April 17, 2021	Women's Tennis	Lanelle Robson Tennis Center • Tucson, AZ	UofA 0, ASU 4	0	1
April 17, 2021	Men's Tennis	Whiteman Tennis Center • Tempe, AZ	UofA 4, ASU 0	1	0
April 16, 2021	Softball	Farrington Stadium • Tempe, AZ	UofA 3, ASU 4	0	1
April 17, 2021	Softball	Farrington Stadium • Tempe, AZ	UofA 1, ASU 8	0	1
April 17, 2021	Softball	Farrington Stadium • Tempe, AZ	UofA 15, ASU 1	0	1
April 18, 2021	Softball	Farrington Stadium • Tempe, AZ	UofA 3, ASU 4	0	1
April 21, 2021	Women's Beach Volleyball	Pera Club • Tempe, AZ	UofA 4, ASU 1	½	0
April 23–25, 2021	Women's Golf (Pac-12 Championship)	Stanford Golf Course • Stanford, CA	UofA 4th(861), ASU 3rd(860)	0	1
April 26–28, 2021	Men's Golf (Pac-12 Championship)	Mayacama Golf Club • Santa Rosa, CA	UofA 1st(1399), ASU 2nd(1403)	1	0
May 14–16, 2021	Men's Outdoor Track & Field (Pac-12 Championship)	Cromwell Field & Loker Track Stadium • Los Angeles, CA	UofA 5th(67), ASU 4th(72)	0	1
May 14–16, 2021	Women's Outdoor Track & Field (Pac-12 Championship)	Cromwell Field & Loker Track Stadium • Los Angeles, CA	UofA 8th(51.5), ASU T-3rd(77)	0	1
TOTALS:				10	9

- 2020–21 season ASU Men's & Women's Swimming & Diving both opted out of the season, resulting in 2 fewer points & did not count towards final standings.
- 2020–21 because of Covid travel restrictions, U of A & ASU Women's Gymnastics competed twice, each meet for ½ point.

=== 2019–20 schedule ===
Arizona – 7½	Arizona – 4½

DATE	SPORT	LOCATION	Result	UA Points	ASU Points
September 26, 2019	Women's Volleyball	Desert Financial Arena • Tempe, AZ	UofA 0, ASU 3	0	½
November 1, 2019	Women's Cross Country (Pac-12 Championship)	Ash Creek Preserve • Monmouth, OR	UofA 6th (191), ASU 11th (318)	1	0
November 1, 2019	Men's Cross Country (Pac-12 Championship)	Ash Creek Preserve • Monmouth, OR	UofA 8th (240), ASU 9th (242)	1	0
November 8, 2019	Women's Soccer	Murphey Field at Mulcahy Soccer Stadium • Tucson, AZ	UofA 1, ASU 0	1	0
November 30, 2019	Women's Volleyball	McKale Center • Tucson, AZ	UofA 2, ASU 3	0	½
November 30, 2019	Football	Sun Devil Stadium • Tempe, AZ	UofA 14, ASU 24	0	1
December 29, 2019	Women's Basketball	Desert Financial Arena • Tempe, AZ	UofA 58, ASU 53	½	0
January 4, 2020	Men's basketball	McKale Center • Tucson, AZ	UofA 75, ASU 47	½	0
January 24, 2020	Women's Basketball	McKale Center • Tucson, AZ	UofA 59, ASU 53	½	0
January 25, 2020	Men's basketball	Desert Financial Arena • Tempe, AZ	UofA 65, ASU 66	0	½
March 6, 2020	Women's Gymnastics	McKale Center • Tucson, AZ	UofA 196.300, ASU 196.525	0	1
February 26–29, 2020	Women's Swimming & Diving (Pac-12 Championship)	Weyerhaeuser King County Aquatic Center • Federal Way, WA	UofA 725(6th), ASU 943.5(5th)	0	1
February 28–29, 2020	Women's Indoor Track and Field (Pac-12 Championship)	Dempsey Indoor • Seattle, WA	UofA 56(4th), ASU 44(9th)	1	0
February 28–29, 2020	Men's Indoor Track and Field (Pac-12 Championship)	Dempsey Indoor • Seattle, WA	UofA 76(2nd), ASU 43(10th)	1	0
March 4–7, 2020	Men's Swimming & Diving (Pac-12 Championship)	Weyerhaeuser King County Aquatic Center • Federal Way, WA	UofA 578(2nd), ASU 567(4th)	1	0
March 20–22, 2020	Softball	Farrington Stadium • Tempe, AZ	UofA, ASU	0	0
March 20–22, 2020	Softball	Farrington Stadium • Tempe, AZ	UofA, ASU	0	0
March 20–22, 2020	Softball	Farrington Stadium • Tempe, AZ	UofA, ASU	0	0
March 29, 2020	Men's Tennis	Whiteman Tennis Center • Tempe, AZ	UofA, ASU	0	0
April 10, 2020	Women's Beach Volleyball	Pera Club • Tempe, AZ	UofA, ASU	0	0
April 16, 2020	Women's Beach Volleyball	Bear Down Beach • Tucson, AZ	UofA, ASU	0	0
April 18, 2020	Women's Tennis	Lanelle Robson Tennis Center • Tucson, AZ	UofA, ASU	0	0
April 24–26, 2020	Women's Golf (Pac-12 Championship)	Stanford Golf Club • Stanford, CA	UofA, ASU	0	0
March 17, 2020	Baseball	Phoenix Municipal Stadium • Phoenix, AZ	UofA, ASU	0	0
April 24–26, 2020	Baseball	Hi Corbett Field • Tucson, AZ	UofA, ASU	0	0
April 24–26, 2020	Baseball	Hi Corbett Field • Tucson, AZ	UofA, ASU	0	0
April 24–26, 2020	Baseball	Hi Corbett Field • Tucson, AZ	UofA, ASU	0	0
April 27–29, 2020	Men's Golf (Pac-12 Championship)	Seattle Golf Club • Shoreline, WA	UofA, ASU	0	0
May 9–17, 2020	Men's Outdoor Track & Field (Pac-12 Championship)	Whyte Track & Field center • Corvallis, OR	UofA, ASU	0	0
May 9–17, 2020	Women's Outdoor Track & Field (Pac-12 Championship)	Whyte Track & Field center • Corvallis, OR	UofA, ASU	0	0
TOTALS:				7½	4½

- All events, Men's & Women's beginning March 12, 2020 would be canceled due to the Covid-19 Pandemic. Arizona was leading 7½−4½ resulting in a victory

=== 2018–19 schedule ===
Arizona – 10½	Arizona State – 10½†

DATE	SPORT	LOCATION	Result	UA Points	ASU Points
September 20, 2018	Women's Volleyball	McKale Center • Tucson, AZ	UofA 3, ASU 0	½	0
October 26, 2018	Women's Cross Country (Pac-12 Championship)	Stanford Golf Course • Stanford, CA	UofA 9th(251), ASU 8th(250)	0	1
October 26, 2018	Men's Cross Country (Pac-12 Championship)	Stanford Golf Course • Stanford, CA	UofA 8th(213), ASU 9th(241)	1	0
November 2, 2018	Women's Soccer	Sun Devil Soccer Stadium • Tempe, AZ	UofA 1, ASU 0	1	0
November 24, 2018	Football	Arizona Stadium • Tucson, AZ	UofA 40, ASU 41	0	1
November 24, 2018	Women's Volleyball	Desert Financial Arena • Tempe, AZ	UofA 3, ASU 0	½	0
December 30, 2018	Women's Basketball	McKale Center • Tucson, AZ	UofA 51, ASU 39	½	0
January 31, 2019	Men's basketball	Desert Financial Arena • Tempe, AZ	UofA 88, ASU 95	0	½
February 1, 2019	Women's Basketball	Desert Financial Arena • Tempe, AZ	UofA 47, ASU 60	0	½
February 22–23, 2019	Women's Indoor Track and Field (Pac-12 Championship)	Dempsey Indoor • Seattle, WA	UofA 5th(51), ASU 7th(46)	1	0
February 22–23, 2019	Men's Indoor Track and Field (Pac-12 Championship)	Dempsey Indoor • Seattle, WA	UofA 6th(56), ASU 30(12th)	1	0
Feb. 27– Mar. 2, 2019	Women's Swimming & Diving (Pac-12 Championship)	Weyerhaeuser King County Aquatic Center • Federal Way, WA	UofA 5th(837), ASU 4th(932.5)	0	1
March 6–9, 2019	Men's Swimming & Diving (Pac-12 Championship)	Weyerhaeuser King County Aquatic Center • Federal Way, WA	UofA 3rd(570), ASU 4th(459.5)	1	0
March 9, 2019	Men's basketball	McKale Center • Tucson, AZ	UofA 64, ASU 72	0	½
March 23, 2019	Women's Gymnastics (Pac-12 Championship)	Maverik Center • West Valley City, UT	UofA 8th, ASU 5th	0	1
March 29–31, 2019	Softball	Hillenbrand Stadium • Tucson, AZ	UofA 8, ASU 0	1	0
March 29–31, 2019	Softball	Hillenbrand Stadium • Tucson, AZ	UofA 8, ASU 0	1	0
March 29–31, 2019	Softball	Hillenbrand Stadium • Tucson, AZ	UofA 2, ASU 0	1	0
March 15, 2019	Women's Beach Volleyball	Bear Down Beach • Tucson, AZ	UofA 3, ASU 2	½	0
March 30, 2019	Men's Tennis	Lanelle Robson Tennis Center • Tucson, AZ	UofA 2, ASU 4	0	1
March 29–31, 2019	Baseball	Phoenix Municipal Stadium • Tempe, AZ	UofA 2, ASU 8	0	1
March 29–31, 2019	Baseball	Phoenix Municipal Stadium • Tempe, AZ	UofA 3, ASU 8	0	1
March 29–31, 2019	Baseball	Phoenix Municipal Stadium • Tempe, AZ	UofA 16, ASU 17	0	1
April 7, 2019	Baseball	Hi Corbett Field • Tucson, AZ	UofA 7, ASU 10	0	1
April 7, 2019	Women's Beach Volleyball	Sun Devil Beach Volleyball Facility • Tempe, AZ	UofA 4, ASU 1	½	0
April 15–17, 2019	Women's Golf (Pac-12 Championship)	Palos Verdes Golf Club • Palos Verdes Estates, CA	UofA 2nd(862), ASU 3rd(867)	1	0
April 20, 2019	Women's Tennis	Whiteman Tennis Center • Tempe, AZ	UofA 0, ASU 4	0	1
April 22–24, 2019	Men's Golf (Pac-12 Championship)	Eugene Country Club • Eugene, OR	UofA 9th(1470), ASU 4th(1443)	0	1
May 4–12, 2019	Men's Outdoor Track & Field (Pac-12 Championship)	Roy P. Drachman Stadium • Tucson, AZ	UofA 3rd(94), ASU 10th(31)	1	0
May 4–12, 2019	Women's Outdoor Track & Field (Pac-12 Championship)	Roy P. Drachman Stadium • Tucson, AZ	UofA 7th(57.5), ASU 6th(69.5)	0	1
TOTALS:				10½	10½

- † – ASU finished 19th while Arizona finished 41st in the Director Cup Standings, resulting in ASU winning the tie-break.

=== 2017–18 schedule ===
Arizona – 11	Arizona State – 10

DATE	SPORT	LOCATION	Result	UA Points	ASU Points
September 21, 2017	Women's Volleyball	Desert Financial Arena • Tempe, AZ	UofA 3, ASU 0	½	0
October 26, 2017	Women's Cross Country (Pac-12 Championship)	Springfield Golf Course • Springfield, OR	UofA 7th (186), ASU 9th (232)	1	0
October 26, 2017	Men's Cross Country (Pac-12 Championship)	Springfield Golf Course • Springfield, OR	UofA 8th(234), ASU 9th(282)	1	0
November 2, 2017	Women's Soccer	Murphey Field at Mulcahy Soccer Stadium • Tucson, AZ	UofA 2, ASU 1	1	0
November 25, 2017	Women's Volleyball	McKale Center • Tucson, AZ	UofA 3, ASU 1	½	0
November 25, 2017	Football	Sun Devil Stadium • Tempe, AZ	UofA 30, ASU 42	0	1
December 30, 2017	Men's basketball	McKale Center • Tucson, AZ	UofA 84, ASU 78	½	0
February 15, 2018	Men's basketball	Desert Financial Arena • Tempe, AZ	UofA 77, ASU 70	½	0
February 16, 2018	Women's Basketball	Desert Financial Arena • Tempe, AZ	UofA 50, ASU 75	0	½
February 18, 2018	Women's Basketball	McKale Center • Tucson, AZ	UofA 45, ASU 65	0	½
February 24, 2018	Women's Gymnastics	Desert Financial Arena • Tempe, AZ	UofA 195.025, ASU 196.725	0	1
February 21–24, 2018	Women's Swimming & Diving (Pac-12 Championship)	Weyerhaeuser King County Aquatic Center • Federal Way, WA	UofA 932.5(5th), ASU 996(3rd)	0	1
February 23–24, 2018	Women's Indoor Track and Field (Pac-12 Championship)	Dempsey Indoor • Seattle, WA	UofA 11th(22), ASU 8th(35)	0	1
February 23–24, 2018	Men's Indoor Track and Field (Pac-12 Championship)	Dempsey Indoor • Seattle, WA	UofA 9th(42), ASU 11th(22)	1	0
Feb. 21–Mar. 3, 2018	Men's Swimming & Diving (Pac-12 Championship)	Weyerhaeuser King County Aquatic Center • Federal Way, WA	UofA 5th(387), ASU 4th(391)	0	1
April 6, 2018	Women's Beach Volleyball	Bear Down Beach • Tucson, AZ	UofA 4, ASU 1	½	0
April 18, 2018	Women's Beach Volleyball	Pera Club • Tempe, AZ	UofA 3, ASU 2	½	0
April 20–22, 2018	Softball	Farrington Stadium • Tempe, AZ	UofA 1, ASU 2	1	0
April 20–22, 2018	Softball	Farrington Stadium • Tempe, AZ	UofA 4, ASU 1	1	0
April 20–22, 2018	Softball	Farrington Stadium • Tempe, AZ	UofA 4, ASU 2	1	0
April 21, 2018	Men's Tennis	Whiteman Tennis Center • Tempe, AZ	UofA 0, ASU 4	0	1
April 21, 2018	Women's Tennis	Lanelle Robson Tennis Center • Tucson, AZ	UofA 2, ASU 4	0	1
April 22–24, 2018	Women's Golf (Pac-12 Championship)	Broadmoor Golf Club • Colorado Springs, CO	UofA 3rd(873), ASU 5th(878)	1	0
April 23–25, 2018	Men's Golf (Pac-12 Championship)	Rolling Hills Country Club • Rolling Hills Estates, CA	UofA 8th(1422), ASU 3rd(1397)	0	1
March 13, 2018	Baseball	Phoenix Municipal Stadium • Phoenix, AZ	UofA 6, ASU 2	1	0
May 17–19, 2018	Baseball	Hi Corbett Field • Tucson, AZ	UofA 6, ASU 4	1	0
May 17–19, 2018	Baseball	Hi Corbett Field • Tucson, AZ	UofA 5, ASU 10	1	0
May 17–19, 2018	Baseball	Hi Corbett Field • Tucson, AZ	UofA 10, ASU 9	1	0
May 5–6 & 12–13, 2018	Men's Outdoor Track & Field (Pac-12 Championship)	Cobb Track and Angell Field • Stanford, CA	UofA 7th(44), ASU 5th(68)	0	1
May 5–6 & 12–13, 2018	Women's Outdoor Track & Field (Pac-12 Championship)	Cobb Track and Angell Field • Stanford, CA	UofA 4th(91), ASU 10th(31.5)	1	0
TOTALS:				11	10

=== 2016–17 schedule ===
Arizona – 9½	Arizona State – 10½

DATE	SPORT	LOCATION	Result	UA Points	ASU Points
September 21, 2016	Women's Volleyball	McKale Center • Tucson, AZ	UofA 3, ASU 1	½	0
October 28, 2016	Women's Cross Country (Pac-12 Championship)	Randolph North Golf Course • Tucson, AZ	UofA 8th(204), ASU 10th(236)	1	0
October 28, 2016	Men's Cross Country (Pac-12 Championship)	Randolph North Golf Course • Tucson, AZ	UofA 9th(234), ASU 8th(225)	0	1
November 4, 2016	Women's Soccer	Sun Devil Soccer Stadium • Tempe, AZ	UofA 1, ASU 0	1	0
November 25, 2016	Football	Arizona Stadium • Tucson, AZ	UofA 56, ASU 35	1	0
November 26, 2016	Women's Volleyball	Desert Financial Arena • Tempe, AZ	UofA 2, ASU 3	0	½
January 12, 2017	Men's basketball	McKale Center • Tucson, AZ	UofA 91, ASU 75	½	0
February 17, 2017	Women's Basketball	McKale Center • Tucson, AZ	UofA 62, ASU 58	½	0
February 19, 2017	Women's Basketball	Desert Financial Arena • Tempe, AZ	UofA 54, ASU 67	0	½
February 24–25, 2017	Women's Indoor Track and Field (Pac-12 Championship)	Dempsey Indoor • Seattle, WA	UofA 9th(29), ASU 6th(45)	0	1
February 24–25, 2017	Men's Indoor Track and Field (Pac-12 Championship)	Dempsey Indoor • Seattle, WA	UofA 9th(42), ASU 5th(53)	0	1
February 22–25, 2017	Women's Swimming & Diving (Pac-12 Championship)	Weyerhaeuser King County Aquatic Center • Federal Way, WA	UofA 4th(1075.5), ASU 6th(709.5)	1	0
March 4, 2017	Men's basketball	Desert Financial Arena • Tempe, AZ	UofA 73, ASU 60	½	0
March 1–4, 2017	Men's Swimming & Diving (Pac-12 Championship)	Weyerhaeuser King County Aquatic Center • Federal Way, WA	UofA 5th(360), ASU 4th(531)	0	1
March 4, 2017	Women's Beach Volleyball	Bear Down Beach • Tucson, AZ	UofA 2, ASU 3	0	½
March 5, 2017	Women's Gymnastics (Pac-12 Championship)	Maverik Center • West Valley City, UT	UofA 195.375, ASU 195.7	0	1
March 11, 2017	Women's Beach Volleyball	Sun Devil Beach Volleyball Facility • Tempe, AZ	UofA 3, ASU 2	½	0
April 22, 2017	Women's Tennis	Whiteman Tennis Center • Tempe, AZ	UofA 2, ASU 4	0	1
April 24–26, 2017	Women's Golf (Pac-12 Championship)	Sewailo Golf Course • Tucson, AZ	UofA 4th(887), ASU 6th(895)	1	0
April 28–30, 2017	Softball	Hillenbrand Stadium • Tucson, AZ	UofA 4, ASU 3	1	0
April 28–30, 2017	Softball	Hillenbrand Stadium • Tucson, AZ	UofA 2, ASU 5	1	0
April 28–30, 2017	Softball	Hillenbrand Stadium • Tucson, AZ	UofA 8, ASU 0	1	0
April 28–30, 2017	Men's Golf (Pac-12 Championship)	Boulder Country Club • Boulder, CO	UofA 9th(1107), ASU 6th(1092)	0	1
April 4, 2017	Baseball	Hi Corbett Field • Tucson, AZ	UofA 11, ASU 2	1	0
May 9, 2017	Baseball	Hi Corbett Field • Tucson, AZ	UofA 13, ASU 14	1	0
May 18–20, 2017	Baseball	Phoenix Municipal Stadium • Phoenix, AZ	UofA 6, ASU 5	1	0
May 18–20, 2017	Baseball	Phoenix Municipal Stadium • Phoenix, AZ	UofA 3, ASU 1	1	0
May 18–20, 2017	Baseball	Phoenix Municipal Stadium • Phoenix, AZ	UofA 9, ASU 5	1	0
May 13–14, 2017	Men's Outdoor Track & Field (Pac-12 Championship)	Hayward Field • Eugene, OR	UofA 9th(50, ASU 8th(51)	0	1
May 13–14, 2017	Women's Outdoor Track & Field (Pac-12 Championship)	Hayward Field • Eugene, OR	UofA 8th(46), ASU 6th(58.5)	0	1
TOTALS:				9½	10½

=== 2015–16 schedule ===
Arizona – 7½	Arizona State – 12½

DATE	SPORT	LOCATION	Result	UA Points	ASU Points
September 24, 2015	Women's Volleyball	Desert Financial Arena • Tempe, AZ	UofA 1, ASU 3	0	½
October 30, 2015	Women's Cross Country (Pac-12 Championship)	Colfax Golf Course • Colfax, WA	UofA 8th(237), ASU 6th(162)	0	1
October 30, 2015	Men's Cross Country (Pac-12 Championship)	Colfax Golf Course • Colfax, WA	UofA 9th(271), ASU 8th(218)	0	1
November 6, 2015	Women's Soccer	Murphey Field at Mulcahy Soccer Stadium • Tucson, AZ	UofA 1, ASU 4	0	1
November 21, 2015	Football	Sun Devil Stadium • Tempe, AZ	UofA 37, ASU 52	0	1
November 27, 2015	Women's Volleyball	McKale Center • Tucson, AZ	UofA 3, ASU 1	½	0
January 3, 2016	Men's basketball	Desert Financial Arena • Tempe, AZ	UofA 94, ASU 82	½	0
January 22, 2016	Women's Basketball	Desert Financial Arena • Tempe, AZ	UofA 49, ASU 61	0	½
January 26, 2016	Women's Basketball	McKale Center • Tucson, AZ	UofA 47, ASU 62	0	½
February 17, 2016	Men's basketball	McKale Center • Tucson, AZ	UofA 99, ASU 61	½	0
February 22, 2016	Women's Gymnastics	Desert Financial Arena • Tempe, AZ	UofA 196.375, ASU 193.975	1	0
February 24–27, 2016	Women's Swimming & Diving (Pac-12 Championship)	Weyerhaeuser King County Aquatic Center • Federal Way, WA	UofA 4th(1125), ASU 8th(472.5)	1	0
February 26–27, 2016	Women's Indoor Track and Field (Pac-12 Championship)	Dempsey Indoor • Seattle, WA	UofA 9th(43), ASU 8th(44)	0	1
February 26–27, 2016	Men's Indoor Track and Field (Pac-12 Championship)	Dempsey Indoor • Seattle, WA	UofA 9th(43), ASU 5th(59)	0	1
March 2–5, 2016	Men's Swimming & Diving (Pac-12 Championship)	Weyerhaeuser King County Aquatic Center • Federal Way, WA	UofA 4th(569), ASU 5th(402)	1	0
March 18–20, 2016	Softball	Farrington Stadium • Tempe, AZ	UofA 2, ASU 0	1	0
March 18–20, 2016	Softball	Farrington Stadium • Tempe, AZ	UofA 5, ASU 4	1	0
March 18–20, 2016	Softball	Farrington Stadium • Tempe, AZ	UofA 2, ASU 3	1	0
April 14, 2016	Women's Beach Volleyball	Bear Down Beach • Tucson, AZ	UofA 4, ASU 1	½	0
April 16, 2016	Women's Tennis	Lanelle Robson Tennis Center • Tucson, AZ	UofA 0, ASU 7	0	1
April 20, 2016	Women's Beach Volleyball	Pera Club • Tempe, AZ	UofA 3, ASU 2	½	0
April 18–20, 2016	Women's Golf (Pac-12 Championship)	Ruby Hill Golf Club • Pleasanton, CA	UofA 4th(856), ASU 3rd(851)	0	1
April 23–25, 2016	Men's Golf (Pac-12 Championship)	Eugene Country Club • Eugene, OR	UofA 9th(1470), ASU 4th(143)	0	1
April 12, 2016	Baseball	Phoenix Municipal Stadium • Phoenix, AZ	UofA 5, ASU 7	0	1
April 26, 2016	Baseball	Phoenix Municipal Stadium • Phoenix, AZ	UofA 8, ASU 0	0	1
May 13–15, 2016	Baseball	Hi Corbett Field • Tucson, AZ	UofA 2, ASU 5	0	1
May 13–15, 2016	Baseball	Hi Corbett Field • Tucson, AZ	UofA 4, ASU 2	0	1
May 13–15, 2016	Baseball	Hi Corbett Field • Tucson, AZ	UofA 1, ASU 5	0	1
May 7–8 & 14–15, 2016	Men's Outdoor Track & Field (Pac-12 Championship)	Husky Track • Seattle, WA	UofA 7th(62), ASU 9th(41)	1	0
May 7–8 & 14–15, 2016	Women's Outdoor Track & Field (Pac-12 Championship)	Husky Track • Seattle, WA	UofA 8th(57), ASU 4th(83)	0	1
TOTALS:				7½	12½

=== 2014–15 schedule ===
Arizona – 7½	Arizona State – 12½

DATE	SPORT	LOCATION	Result	UA Points	ASU Points
September 24, 2014	Women's Volleyball	McKale Center • Tucson, AZ	UofA 3, ASU 2	½	0
October 31, 2014	Women's Cross Country (Pac-12 Championship)	Metropolitan Golf Links • Oakland, CA	UofA 8th(200), ASU 6th(158)	0	1
October 31, 2014	Men's Cross Country (Pac-12 Championship)	Metropolitan Golf Links • Oakland, CA	UofA 8th(206), ASU 6th(182)	0	1
November 7, 2014	Women's Soccer	Sun Devil Soccer Stadium • Tempe, AZ	UofA 0, ASU 1	0	1
November 28, 2014	Football	Arizona Stadium • Tucson, AZ	UofA 42, ASU 35	1	0
November 28, 2014	Women's Volleyball	Desert Financial Arena • Tempe, AZ	UofA 3, ASU 0	½	0
January 4, 2015	Men's basketball	McKale Center • Tucson, AZ	UofA 73, ASU 49	½	0
January 8, 2015	Women's Basketball	McKale Center • Tucson, AZ	UofA 41, ASU 88	0	½
January 10, 2015	Women's Basketball	Desert Financial Arena • Tempe, AZ	UofA 54, ASU 71	0	½
February 7, 2015	Men's basketball	Desert Financial Arena • Tempe, AZ	UofA 78, ASU 81	0	½
February 16, 2015	Women's Gymnastics	McKale Center • Tucson, AZ	UofA 196.625, ASU 195.375	1	0
February 25–28, 2015	Women's Swimming & Diving (Pac-12 Championship)	Weyerhaeuser King County Aquatic Center • Federal Way, WA	UofA 4th(954.5), ASU 7th(610)	1	0
February 27–28, 2015	Women's Indoor Track and Field (Pac-12 Championship)	Dempsey Indoor • Seattle, WA	UofA 7th(48.5), ASU 3rd(69.3)	0	1
February 27–28, 2015	Men's Indoor Track and Field (Pac-12 Championship)	Dempsey Indoor • Seattle, WA	UofA 9th(37), ASU 3rd(70)	0	1
March 4–7, 2015	Men's Swimming & Diving (Pac-12 Championship)	Weyerhaeuser King County Aquatic Center • Federal Way, WA	UofA 4th(673), ASU 5th(309)	1	0
March 27–28, 2015	Softball	Hillenbrand Stadium • Tucson, AZ	UofA 5, ASU 8	0	1
March 27–28, 2015	Softball	Hillenbrand Stadium • Tucson, AZ	UofA 4, ASU 9	0	1
March 27–28, 2015	Softball	Hillenbrand Stadium • Tucson, AZ	UofA 11, ASU 1	0	1
April 10, 2015	Women's Beach Volleyball	Pera Club • Tempe, AZ	UofA 4, ASU 1	½	0
April 17, 2015	Women's Tennis	Whiteman Tennis Center • Tempe, AZ	UofA 0, ASU 7	0	1
April 22, 2015	Women's Beach Volleyball	Bear Down Beach • Tucson, AZ	UofA 4, ASU 1	½	0
April 20–22, 2015	Women's Golf (Pac-12 Championship)	Boulder Country Club • Boulder, CO	UofA 1st(853), ASU 9th(882)	1	0
April 27–29, 2015	Men's Golf (Pac-12 Championship)	Palouse Ridge • Pullman, WA	UofA 9th(1446), ASU 3rd(1411)	0	1
April 22, 2015	Baseball	Hi Corbett Field • Tucson, AZ	UofA 5, ASU 6	0	1
April 12, 2015	Baseball	Hi Corbett Field • Tucson, AZ	UofA 17, ASU 6	0	1
April 11–13, 2015	Baseball	Phoenix Municipal Stadium • Phoenix, AZ	UofA 4, ASU 5	0	1
April 11–13, 2015	Baseball	Phoenix Municipal Stadium • Phoenix, AZ	UofA 7, ASU 13	0	1
April 11–13, 2015	Baseball	Phoenix Municipal Stadium • Phoenix, AZ	UofA 7, ASU 2	0	1
May 9–10 & 16–17, 2015	Men's Outdoor Track & Field (Pac-12 Championship)	Drake Stadium • Los Angeles, CA	UofA 6th(73.5), ASU 5th(75)	0	1
May 9–10 & 16–17, 2015	Women's Outdoor Track & Field (Pac-12 Championship)	Drake Stadium • Los Angeles, CA	UofA 9th(36), ASU 4th(72)	0	1
TOTALS:				7½	12½

=== 2013–14 schedule ===
Arizona – 8½	Arizona State victories – 11½

DATE	SPORT	LOCATION	Result	UA Points	ASU Points
September 24, 2013	Women's Volleyball	Desert Financial Arena • Tempe, AZ	UofA 0, ASU 3	0	½
November 2, 2013	Women's Cross Country (Pac-12 Championship)	Coal Creek Golf Course • Louisville, CO	UofA 1st(69), ASU 6th(138)	1	0
November 2, 2013	Men's Cross Country (Pac-12 Championship)	Coal Creek Golf Course • Louisville, CO	UofA 8th(194), ASU 4th(140)	0	1
November 7, 2013	Women's Soccer	Murphey Field at Mulcahy Soccer Stadium • Tucson, AZ	UofA 2, ASU 0	1	0
November 29, 2013	Women's Volleyball	McKale Center • Tucson, AZ	UofA 3, ASU 1	½	0
November 30, 2013	Football	Sun Devil Stadium • Tempe, AZ	UofA 21, ASU 58	0	1
January 16, 2014	Men's basketball	McKale Center • Tucson, AZ	UofA 91, ASU 68	½	0
February 4, 2014	Women's Basketball	Desert Financial Arena • Tempe, AZ	UofA 36, ASU 60	0	½
February 9, 2014	Women's Basketball	McKale Center • Tucson, AZ	UofA 68, ASU 49	½	0
February 14, 2014	Men's basketball	Desert Financial Arena • Tempe, AZ	UofA 66, ASU 69	0	½
February 22, 2014	Women's Gymnastics	Desert Financial Arena • Tempe, AZ	UofA 195.350, ASU 196.125	0	1
	Women's Swimming & Diving (Pac-12 Championship)	Weyerhaeuser King County Aquatic Center • Federal Way, WA	UofA 5th(933.5), ASU 7th(461.5)	1	0
February 28–March 1, 2014	Women's Indoor Track and Field (Pac-12 Championship)	Dempsey Indoor • Seattle, WA	UofA 3rd(75), ASU 2nd(81)	0	1
February 28–March 1, 2014	Men's Indoor Track and Field (Pac-12 Championship)	Dempsey Indoor • Seattle, WA	UofA 5th(66), ASU 2nd(93)	0	1
March 5–8, 2014	Men's Swimming & Diving (Pac-12 Championship)	Weyerhaeuser King County Aquatic Center • Federal Way, WA	UofA 4th(596.5), ASU 6th(402)	1	0
March 28–30, 2014	Softball	Farrington Stadium • Tempe, AZ	UofA 1, ASU 2	0	1
March 28–30, 2014	Softball	Farrington Stadium • Tempe, AZ	UofA 1, ASU 4	0	1
March 28–30, 2014	Softball	Farrington Stadium • Tempe, AZ	UofA 6, ASU 5	0	1
April 19, 2014	Women's Tennis	Lanelle Robson Tennis Center • Tucson, AZ	UofA 4, ASU 2	1	0
April 19, 2014	Women's Beach Volleyball	Ocean Park Ceach • Santa Monica, CA	UofA 2, ASU 3	0	1
April 25–27, 2014	Women's Golf (Pac-12 Championship)	Trysting Tree Golf Club • Corvallis, OR	UofA T-2nd(870), ASU 5th(883)	1	0
April 25–27, 2014	Men's Golf (Pac-12 Championship)	The Gallery at Dove Mountain • Marana, AZ	UofA 9th(1503), ASU 6th(1487)	0	1
March 26, 2014	Baseball	Packard Stadium • Tempe, AZ	UofA 6, ASU 14	0	1
April 9, 2014	Baseball	Packard Stadium • Tempe, AZ	UofA 10, ASU 9	0	1
April 25–29, 2014	Baseball	Hi Corbett Field • Tucson, AZ	UofA 1, ASU 2	0	1
April 25–29, 2014	Baseball	Hi Corbett Field • Tucson, AZ	UofA 0, ASU 7	0	1
April 25–29, 2014	Baseball	Hi Corbett Field • Tucson, AZ	UofA 6, ASU 1	0	1
May 10–11 & 17–18, 2014	Men's Outdoor Track & Field (Pac-12 Championship)	Mooberry Track & Field Complex • Pullman, WA	UofA 3rd(83), ASU 4th(80.75)	1	0
May 10–11 & 17–18, 2014	Women's Outdoor Track & Field (Pac-12 Championship)	Mooberry Track & Field Complex • Pullman, WA	UofA 5th(74), ASU T-3rd(75)	0	1
TOTALS:				8½	11½

=== 2012–13 schedule ===
Arizona – 9½	Arizona State – 8½

DATE	SPORT	LOCATION	Result	UA Points	ASU Points
September 22, 2012	Women's Volleyball	McKale Center • Tucson, AZ	UofA 1, ASU 3	0	½
October 27, 2012	Women's Cross Country (Pac-12 Championship)	Robinson Ranch Golf Course • Santa Clarita, CA	UofA 2nd(69), ASU 9th(158)	1	0
October 27, 2012	Men's Cross Country (Pac-12 Championship)	Robinson Ranch Golf Course • Santa Clarita, CA	UofA 7th(166), ASU 4th(109)	0	1
November 2, 2012	Women's Soccer	Sun Devil Soccer Stadium • Tempe, AZ	UofA 1, ASU 2	0	1
November 23, 2012	Football	Arizona Stadium • Tucson, AZ	UofA 34, ASU 41	0	1
November 28, 2012	Women's Volleyball	Desert Financial Arena • Tempe, AZ	UofA 3, ASU 2	½	0
January 19, 2013	Men's basketball	Desert Financial Arena • Tempe, AZ	UofA 71, ASU 54	½	0
February 19, 2013	Women's Basketball	McKale Center • Tucson, AZ	UofA 77, ASU 81	0	½
February 22–13, 2013	Women's Indoor Track and Field (Pac-12 Championship)	Dempsey Indoor • Seattle, WA	UofA 3rd(92), ASU 2nd(96)	0	1
February 24, 2013	Women's Basketball	Desert Financial Arena • Tempe, AZ	UofA 58, ASU 59	0	½
March 2, 2013	Women's Gymnastics	McKale Center • Tucson, AZ	UofA 196.500, ASU 193.850	1	0
February 27–March 2, 2013	Women's Swimming & Diving (Pac-12 Championship)	Weyerhaeuser King County Aquatic Center • Federal Way, WA	UofA 4th(1128.5), ASU 6th(786.5)	1	0
March 2–6, 2013	Men's Swimming & Diving (Pac-12 Championship)	Weyerhaeuser King County Aquatic Center • Federal Way, WA	UofA 4th(483), ASU 6th(257)	1	0
March 9, 2013	Men's basketball	McKale Center • Tucson, AZ	UofA 73, ASU 58	½	0
April 20, 2013	Women's Tennis	Whiteman Tennis Center • Tempe, AZ	UofA 3, ASU 4	0	1
April 22–24, 2013	Women's Golf (Pac-12 Championship)	Valencia Country Club • Los Angeles, CA	UofA 4th(882), ASU 6th(890)	1	0
April 28–30, 2013	Men's Golf (Pac-12 Championship)	Los Angeles Country Club • Los Angeles, CA	UofA 8th(1486), ASU 5th(1456)	0	1
May 3–5, 2013	Softball	Hillenbrand Stadium • Tucson, AZ	UofA 10, ASU 9	1	0
May 3–5, 2013	Softball	Hillenbrand Stadium • Tucson, AZ	UofA 6, ASU 4	1	0
May 3–5, 2013	Softball	Hillenbrand Stadium • Tucson, AZ	UofA 6, ASU 7	1	0
May 4–5 & 11–12, 2013	Men's Outdoor Track & Field (Pac-12 Championship)	Drake Stadium • Los Angeles, CA	UofA 7th(67), ASU 4th(94)	0	1
May 4–5 & 11–12, 2013	Women's Outdoor Track & Field (Pac-12 Championship)	Drake Stadium • Los Angeles, CA	UofA 2nd(123), ASU 3rd(110.3)	1	0
March 24, 2013	Baseball	Sancet Stadium • Tucson, AZ	UofA 10, ASU 9	1	0
April 30, 2013	Baseball	Sancet Stadium • Tucson, AZ	UofA 5, ASU 7	1	0
May 17–19, 2013	Baseball	Packard Stadium • Tempe, AZ	UofA 10, ASU 7	1	0
May 17–19, 2013	Baseball	Packard Stadium • Tempe, AZ	UofA 3, ASU 6	1	0
May 17–19, 2013	Baseball	Packard Stadium • Tempe, AZ	UofA 7, ASU 6	1	0
TOTALS:				9½	8½

=== 2011–12 schedule ===
Arizona – 12½	Arizona State – 5½

DATE	SPORT	LOCATION	Result	UA Points	ASU Points
October 29, 2011	Women's Cross Country (Pac-12 Championship)	Wigwam Resort • Litchfield Park, AZ	UofA 8th(190), ASU 9th(195)	1	0
October 29, 2011	Men's Cross Country (Pac-12 Championship)	Wigwam Resort • Litchfield Park, AZ	UofA 5th(190), ASU 6th(168)	1	0
November 4, 2011	Women's Soccer	Murphey Field at Mulcahy Soccer Stadium • Tucson, AZ	UofA 1, ASU 2	0	1
November 22, 2011	Women's Volleyball	McKale Center • Tucson, AZ	UofA 3, ASU 0	½	0
November 26, 2011	Women's Volleyball	Desert Financial Arena • Tempe, AZ	UofA 1, ASU 3	0	½
November 19, 2011	Football	Sun Devil Stadium • Tempe, AZ	UofA 31, ASU 27	1	0
December 31, 2011	Men's basketball	McKale Center • Tucson, AZ	UofA 68, ASU 51	½	0
December 31, 2012	Women's Basketball	Desert Financial Arena • Tempe, AZ	UofA 45, ASU 60	0	½
February 11, 2012	Women's Gymnastics	McKale Center • Tucson, AZ	UofA 195.900, ASU 195.500	½	½
March 3, 2012	Women's Basketball	McKale Center • Tucson, AZ	UofA 63, ASU 70	0	½
March 4, 2012	Men's basketball	Desert Financial Arena • Tempe, AZ	UofA 80, ASU 87	0	½
February 22–25, 2012	Women's Swimming & Diving (Pac-12 Championship)	Weyerhaeuser King County Aquatic Center • Federal Way, WA	UofA 4th(1171), ASU 6th(790.5)	1	0
February 24–25, 2012	Women's Indoor Track and Field (Pac-12 Championship)	Dempsey Indoor • Seattle, WA	UofA 2nd(110), ASU 4th(68)	1	0
February 29–March 4, 2012	Men's Swimming & Diving (Pac-12 Championship)	Weyerhaeuser King County Aquatic Center • Federal Way, WA	UofA 3rd(543), ASU 7th(221.5)	1	0
March 23–25, 2012	Softball	Farrington Stadium • Tempe, AZ	UofA 2, ASU 4	0	1
March 23–25, 2012	Softball	Farrington Stadium • Tempe, AZ	UofA 6, ASU 9	0	1
March 23–25, 2012	Softball	Farrington Stadium • Tempe, AZ	UofA 6, ASU 7	0	1
April 20, 2012	Women's Tennis	Lanelle Robson Tennis Center • Tucson, AZ	UofA 7, ASU 0	1	0
April 27–29, 2012	Women's Golf (Pac-12 Championship)	Palouse Ridge Golf Club • Pullman, WA	UofA 3rd(884), ASU 5th(887)	1	0
April 25–27, 2012	Men's Golf (Pac-12 Championship)	Trysting Tree Golf Club • Corvallis, OR	UofA 10th(1493), ASU 11th(1499)	1	0
April 17, 2012	Baseball	Packard Stadium • Tempe, AZ	UofA 8, ASU 12	1	0
May 16, 2012	Baseball	Packard Stadium • Tempe, AZ	UofA 10, ASU 9	1	0
May 25–27, 2012	Baseball	Sancet Stadium • Tucson, AZ	UofA 1, ASU 0	1	0
May 25–27, 2012	Baseball	Sancet Stadium • Tucson, AZ	UofA 7, ASU 9	1	0
May 25–27, 2012	Baseball	Sancet Stadium • Tucson, AZ	UofA 8, ASU 7	1	0
May 12–13 & 17–18, 2012	Men's Outdoor Track & Field (Pac-12 Championship)	Hayward Field • Eugene, OR	UofA 3rd(94.5), ASU 5th(85)	1	0
May 12–13 & 17–18, 2012	Women's Outdoor Track & Field (Pac-12 Championship)	Hayward Field • Eugene, OR	UofA 3rd(94), ASU 2nd(116.5)	0	1
TOTALS:				12½	5½

=== 2010–11 schedule ===
Arizona – 11½	Arizona State – 6½

DATE	SPORT	LOCATION	Result	UA Points	ASU Points
October 1, 2010	Women's Volleyball	McKale Center • Tucson, AZ	UofA 3, ASU 0	½	0
October 15, 2010	Women's Soccer	Sun Devil Soccer Stadium • Tempe, AZ	UofA 1, ASU 2	0	1
October 29, 2010	Women's Volleyball	Desert Financial Arena • Tempe, AZ	UofA 3, ASU 2	½	0
October 30, 2010	Women's Cross Country (Pac-10 Championship)	Jefferson Park Golf Course • Seattle, WA	UofA 2nd(65), ASU 7th(188)	1	0
October 30, 2010	Men's Cross Country (Pac-10 Championship)	Jefferson Park Golf Course • Seattle, WA	UofA 8th(196), ASU 5th(143)	0	1
December 2, 2010	Football	Arizona Stadium • Tucson, AZ	UofA 29, ASU 30	0	1
January 9, 2011	Women's Gymnastics	McKale Center • Tucson, AZ	UofA 193.625, ASU 192.050	1	0
January 15, 2011	Men's basketball	McKale Center • Tucson, AZ	UofA 80, ASU 69	½	0
January 16, 2011	Women's Basketball	Desert Financial Arena • Tempe, AZ	UofA 43, ASU 75	0	½
February 13, 2011	Women's Basketball	McKale Center • Tucson, AZ	UofA 73, ASU 61	½	0
February 13, 2011	Men's basketball	Desert Financial Arena • Tempe, AZ	UofA 67, ASU 52	½	0
February 25–26, 2011	Women's Indoor Track and Field (Pac-10 Championship)	Dempsey Indoor • Seattle, WA	UofA 2nd(128), ASU 4th(92)	1	0
February 23–February 26, 2011	Women's Swimming & Diving (Pac-10 Championship)	Weyerhaeuser King County Aquatic Center • Federal Way, WA	UofA 5th(874), ASU 6th(780)	1	0
February 23–March 5, 2011	Men's Swimming & Diving (Pac-10 Championship)	Belmont Plaza Olympic Pool • Long Beach, CA	UofA 4th(483), ASU 5th(273)	1	0
April 17–19, 2011	Women's Golf (Pac-10 Championship)	Eugene Country Club • Eugene, OR	UofA 1st(878), ASU 10th(DNF)	1	0
April 20, 2011	Women's Tennis	Whiteman Tennis Center • Tempe, AZ	UofA 0, ASU 0 (UofA Forfeit)	0	1
April 21–23, 2011	Softball	Hillenbrand Stadium • Tucson, AZ	UofA 0, ASU 4	0	1
April 21–23, 2011	Softball	Hillenbrand Stadium • Tucson, AZ	UofA 10, ASU 13	0	1
April 21–23, 2011	Softball	Hillenbrand Stadium • Tucson, AZ	UofA 3, ASU 8	0	1
April 29–30, 2011	Men's Golf (Pac-10 Championship)	Stanford Golf Course • Stanford, CA	UofA 9th(1090), ASU 10th(1102)	1	0
May 6–7 & 13–14, 2011	Men's Outdoor Track & Field (Pac-10 Championship)	Roy P. Drachman Stadium • Tucson, AZ	UofA 2nd(112), ASU T-3rd(99)	1	0
May 6–7 & 13–14, 2011	Women's Outdoor Track & Field (Pac-10 Championship)	Roy P. Drachman Stadium • Tucson, AZ	UofA 2nd(150), ASU 3rd(121)	1	0
March 25–27, 2011	Baseball	Packard Stadium • Tempe, AZ	UofA 5, ASU 2	0	1
March 25–27, 2011	Baseball	Packard Stadium • Tempe, AZ	UofA15, ASU 5	0	1
March 25–27, 2011	Baseball	Packard Stadium • Tempe, AZ	UofA 1, ASU 8	0	1
April 5, 2011	Baseball	Sancet Stadium • Tucson, AZ	UofA 5, ASU 10	0	1
April 26, 2011	Baseball	Sancet Stadium • Tucson, AZ	UofA 3, ASU 4	0	1
TOTALS:				11½	6½

=== 2009–10 schedule ===
Arizona – 10½	Arizona State – 7½

DATE	SPORT	LOCATION	Result	UA Points	ASU Points
October 16, 2009	Women's Volleyball	Desert Financial Arena • Tempe, AZ	UofA 3, ASU 1	½	0
October 23, 2009	Women's Soccer	Murphey Field at Mulcahy Soccer Stadium • Tucson, AZ	UofA 2, ASU 1^{OT}	1	0
October 30, 2009	Women's Cross Country (Pac-10 Championship)	Sky Links Golf Course • Long Beach, CA	UofA 6th(130), ASU 3rd(110)	0	1
October 30, 2009	Men's Cross Country (Pac-10 Championship)	Sky Links Golf Course • Long Beach, CA	UofA 8th(193), ASU 3rd(88)	0	1
November 13, 2009	Women's Volleyball	McKale Center • Tucson, AZ	UofA 3, ASU 0	½	0
November 28, 2009	Football	Sun Devil Stadium • Tempe, AZ	UofA 20, ASU 17	1	0
January 23, 2010	Men's basketball	Desert Financial Arena • Tempe, AZ	UofA 77, ASU 58	½	0
January 24, 2010	Women's Gymnastics	McKale Center • Tucson, AZ	UofA 195.675, ASU 194.900	1	0
January 24, 2010	Women's Basketball	McKale Center • Tucson, AZ	UofA 67, ASU 73	0	½
February 20, 2010	Women's Basketball	Desert Financial Arena • Tempe, AZ	UofA 49, ASU 57	0	½
February 21, 2010	Men's basketball	McKale Center • Tucson, AZ	UofA 69, ASU 73	0	½
February 21–24, 2010	Women's Swimming & Diving (Pac-10 Championship)	Belmont Plaza Olympic Pool • Long Beach, CA	UofA 4th(1223.5), ASU 6th(635.5)	1	0
February 25–26, 2010	Women's Indoor Track and Field (Pac-10 Championship)	Dempsey Indoor • Seattle, WA	UofA 3rd(109), ASU 4th(75)	1	0
February 28–March 3, 2010	Men's Swimming & Diving (Pac-10 Championship)	Belmont Plaza Olympic Pool • Long Beach, CA	UofA 3rd(654.5), ASU 5th(326)	1	0
April 1–3, 2010	Softball	Farrington Stadium • Tempe, AZ	UofA 12, ASU 6	1	0
April 1–3, 2010	Softball	Farrington Stadium • Tempe, AZ	UofA 1, ASU 11	1	0
April 1–3, 2010	Softball	Farrington Stadium • Tempe, AZ	UofA 14, ASU 2	1	0
April 17, 2010	Women's Tennis	Lanelle Robson Tennis Center • Tucson, AZ	UofA 2, ASU 5	0	1
April 17–19, 2010	Women's Golf (Pac-12 Championship)	Eugene Country Club • Eugene, OR	UofA 1st(878), ASU 10th(DNF)	1	0
April 26–28, 2010	Men's Golf (Pac-12 Championship)	Karsten Golf Course • Tempe, AZ	UofA 9th(1421), ASU 4th(1401)	0	1
April 10, 2010	Baseball	Packard Stadium • Tempe, AZ	UofA 4, ASU 2	0	1
May 4, 2010	Baseball	Packard Stadium • Tempe, AZ	UofA 1, ASU 13	0	1
May 15–17, 2010	Baseball	Sancet Stadium • Tucson, AZ	UofA 4, ASU 12	0	1
May 15–17, 2010	Baseball	Sancet Stadium • Tucson, AZ	UofA 12, ASU 4	0	1
May 15–17, 2010	Baseball	Sancet Stadium • Tucson, AZ	UofA 2, ASU 4	0	1
May 8–9 & 15–16, 2010	Men's Outdoor Track & Field (Pac-10 Championship)	Edwards Stadium • Berkeley, CA	UofA 9th(26), ASU 4th(85)	0	1
May 8–9 & 15–16, 2010	Women's Outdoor Track & Field (Pac-10 Championship)	Edwards Stadium • Berkeley, CA	UofA 2nd(109), ASU 3rd(89.5)	1	0
TOTALS:				10½	7½
