= Arizona–Arizona State football rivalry =

College football rivalry

Duel in the Desert
- Arizona Wildcats Arizona State Sun Devils
- First meeting: November 30, 1899; Normal School of Arizona, 11–2
- Latest meeting: November 28, 2025; Arizona, 23–7
- Next meeting: November 28, 2026
- Stadiums: Casino Del Sol Stadium, Mountain America Stadium
- Trophy: Territorial Cup (1899, 2001–present); Saguaro Trophy (1998–2000); Big Game Trophy (1979–1997)

Statistics
- Total meetings: 99
- All-time series: Arizona leads, 52–45–1 (.536)
- Trophy series: Territorial Cup Series
- Largest victory: Arizona, 67–0 (1946)
- Longest win streak: Arizona, 11 (1932–1948)
- Current win streak: Arizona, 1 (2025–present)

Locations of Arizona and Arizona State

The Arizona–Arizona State football rivalry (also known as the Duel in the Desert) is a college football rivalry between the University of Arizona Wildcats (UA) and the Arizona State University Sun Devils (ASU).

One of the longest football rivalries, the winner receives the Territorial Cup, created 127 years ago for the 1899 champion between schools in Arizona and which the NCAA has certified as the oldest rivalry trophy in college football. Although the Territorial Cup did not change hands as a regular part of the competition until 2001, the rivalry between the two schools continued after 1899, a semi-regular event until becoming an annual event, uninterrupted, from 1946 onwards. In the entire history of the rivalry, the game has never been contested anywhere beside Tempe or Tucson, and alternates between the two respective campuses. Games in odd-numbered years are played in Tempe at ASU, and even-numbered years in Tucson at UA. It is part of the wider Arizona–Arizona State rivalry, which crosses 20 varsity intercollegiate sports. It is also the biggest and most anticipated football game in the state of Arizona each year.

== History ==
The rivalry dates to 1899 in the Arizona Territory, when the University of Arizona in Tucson played the Normal School of Arizona of Tempe – which later evolved into Arizona State University – as part of the Arizona Territorial Football League Championship. (Arizona, as well as New Mexico, achieved statehood in 1912.)

The championship was a four-way series that also included Phoenix Union High School and Phoenix Indian School. Arizona and the Normal School met on November 30, 1899, for a Thanksgiving Day match at Carrillo Gardens in Tucson. Contemporary newspaper stories indicate that this was the first game for the university squad, while the Normal team was comparatively more experienced and better trained. The event drew 300 enthusiastic fans and was followed by a post-game Thanksgiving celebration for both teams hosted by the university. The "Normals", as they were called, won the game 11–2; as they had previously defeated the other schools, they were declared champions and received the Territorial Cup.

The two teams played each other sporadically for the next decades, and have played almost every year beginning in 1925 (when Arizona State became a four-year college). The rivalry became particularly heated in the late 1950s amid the political contention over turning Arizona State College into an official university, a change opposed by the University of Arizona and many of its alumni. In 1958, the year the measure was to be put to a statewide vote, Arizona State defeated Arizona 47–0. The blowout win was a major point of pride for Arizona State, which became a university later that year.

Another heated game came in 1968. The contest was expected to decide which team would go on to the Sun Bowl, but before the game, Arizona coach Darrell Mudra issued an ultimatum to the Sun Bowl committee that his team would not play in the bowl unless they were selected regardless of who won. The committee chose Arizona, who promptly lost to Arizona State 30–7 in what became known as the "Ultimatum Bowl"; Arizona proceeded to lose the 1968 Sun Bowl 34–10 to the Auburn Tigers. The events led to the creation of the Fiesta Bowl as a default bowl for Arizona State should they receive no other bids. It went on to become part of the highly lucrative Bowl Championship Series and part of the College Football Playoff system.

The rivalry series has been known for having decades being dominated by each team, with ASU having the advantage during the 1960s and 1970s, and UA dominating the early years, as well as the 1980s and 1990s.

In the modern era of the game, it has often been played on the day after Thanksgiving. It has most recently been scheduled for the Saturday after Thanksgiving to accommodate network television coverage. Starting with the 2009–2010 school year, both schools created a “Territorial Cup Series” that encompasses each of the 20 varsity intercollegiate sports that Arizona and Arizona State compete head to head in, apparently due to the schools believing that the rivalry happens in all sports and not only in football. Each sport is worth either a half or full point in the year-long competition. While the series has yet to have an official sponsor like other rivalry series between two universities, both UA and ASU have tracked down and promoted the series each season. The school that records the most points during the school year wins a trophy that is named after the Territorial Cup football trophy. If both schools finished tied, the winner of the football game decides the tiebreaker and is declared the winner. As of the 2025 season, UA leads the series and is in possession of the trophy.

== Rivalry name ==
The rivalry has had several nicknames, including the “Battle of Arizona”, the “Grand Canyon Rivalry” (not to be confused with the rivalry between Northern Arizona and Southern Utah that shares the same name), “Desert Wars” (due to Arizona being known for having a desert climate), the “Cactus War” (named after Arizona's prominent feature, the saguaro cactus), and the “Phoenix–Tucson rivalry” (due to both schools being located in state's two largest metropolitan areas, with ASU in Tempe, Phoenix's east suburb, and UA located within the Tucson city limits), with the most famous nickname for the rivalry being the “Duel in the Desert” (or the “Desert Duel”).

== Territorial Cup ==
In 1899, and continuously since 2001, each year's winner receives the Territorial Cup, a traveling trophy. The trophy was originally used in 1899 for the series that involved the teams' first ever meeting. As the Normal School won all three of its games, it was declared champion and awarded the trophy. The cup's name refers to the fact that Arizona was a U.S. territory at the time; it became a state in 1912, along with New Mexico.

After the tournament the trophy's whereabouts were unknown until 1980 when it was rediscovered in the vault of a church adjacent to Arizona State's campus. The cup was put on display in the Alumni Association headquarters and then the University Archives. It was later authenticated as the original cup by the NCAA, making it the oldest rivalry game trophy in college football.

In 2000, Arizona contacted Arizona State about displaying the cup on their campus. The following year, then ASU President Lattie Coor ordered that the Territorial Cup be shared as a traveling trophy, to be displayed by each year's winner. Coor and then UA President Peter Likins signed a protocol governing the cup's use and care. Each year the tradition is celebrated at a pre-game reception for boosters. A replica version was also made and is the trophy presented to the winner after the game.

The cup is silver plate over Britannia base metal and was manufactured by Reed & Barton of Taunton, Massachusetts. It was a standard style priced at $20 ($462.05 in 2010 dollars) in Reed and Barton's 1910 catalog. The inscription reads "Arizona Football League Championship 1899 Normal".

== Series history ==
Arizona State University was previously known as the Normal School of Arizona (1899–1901), Tempe Normal School (1901–1925), Tempe State Teacher's College (1925–1928), Arizona State Teacher's College (1928–1945), and Arizona State College (1945–1958) before becoming its current name since 1958 (Arizona has always been called the University of Arizona since their football program began playing in 1899). Arizona State did not come under the control and patronage of the state's Board of Regents until 1945 and the teams did not play each other every year until 1946.

In the early part of the rivalry series, the games were played in Tucson due to the fact that ASU's home stadium held very few fans. In 1931, ASU hosted the game for the first time. Arizona dominated the early portion of the series, winning 20 of the first 22 meetings, by having more physical and better-trained players than ASU. The Sun Devils had a reign of dominance from 1949 to 1981, winning 24 of 33, including a 13–2 stretch from 1965 to 1979, under the leadership of ASU's legendary coach Frank Kush. The Wildcats got the best of ASU from 1982 to 1998, going 13–3–1 (with the tie occurring in 1987) under the guidance of coaches Larry Smith and Dick Tomey and a dominant defensive unit that was one of the nation's best in the early 1990s.

Arizona State had their 2021 victory vacated in 2024 due to NCAA violations including tampering, recruiting inducements, and impermissible tryouts (the game still existed as a loss on the Arizona side to it being played on field). Arizona won the 2025 meeting by a score of 23–7 and currently has a one-game winning streak.

With both teams leaving the Pac-12 Conference for the Big 12 prior to the start of the 2024 football season, the Wildcats won the series in the Pac-10/12 era, 23–21–1 (officially 21–23–1 on the Arizona State side due their vacated 2021 win).

== Game results ==
Arizona victories	Arizona State victories	Ties	Forfeits/Vacated wins

No.	Date	Location	Winner	Score
1	November 30, 1899	Tucson	Tempe Normal	11–2
2	November 22, 1902	Tucson	Arizona	12–0
3	September 22, 1914	Tucson	Arizona	34–0
4	October 9, 1915	Tucson	Arizona	7–0
5	September 8, 1919	Tucson	Arizona	59–0
6	October 10, 1925	Tucson	Arizona	13–3
7	October 16, 1926	Tucson	Arizona	35–0
8	October 20, 1928	Tucson	Arizona	39–0
9	November 2, 1929	Tucson	Arizona	26–0
10	October 18, 1930	Tucson	Arizona	6–0
11	October 31, 1931	Phoenix	Arizona State Teacher's	19–6
12	October 22, 1932	Tucson	Arizona	20–6
13	November 18, 1933	Phoenix	Arizona	26–7
14	November 17, 1934	Tucson	Arizona	32–6
15	September 28, 1935	Tucson	Arizona	26–0
16	October 10, 1936	Tempe	Arizona	18–0
17	October 2, 1937	Tucson	Arizona	20–6
18	October 25, 1941	Tempe	Arizona	20–7
19	October 10, 1942	Tempe	Arizona	23–0
20	September 28, 1946	Tucson	Arizona	67–0
21	November 15, 1947	Tempe	Arizona	26–13
22	October 30, 1948	Tucson	Arizona	33–21
23	November 12, 1949	Tempe	Arizona State College	34–7
24	November 11, 1950	Tucson	Arizona State College	47–13
25	November 10, 1951	Tempe	Arizona State College	61–14
26	November 8, 1952	Tucson	Arizona State College	20–18
27	November 28, 1953	Tempe	Arizona	35–0
28	November 20, 1954	Tucson	Arizona	54–14
29	November 26, 1955	Tempe	Arizona	7–6
30	November 17, 1956	Tucson	Arizona State College	20–0
31	November 30, 1957	Tempe	#15 Arizona State College	47–7
32	November 22, 1958	Tucson	Arizona State	47–0
33	November 28, 1959	Tempe	Arizona State	15–9
34	November 26, 1960	Tucson	Arizona	35–7
35	November 25, 1961	Tempe	Arizona	22–13
36	November 24, 1962	Tucson	Arizona	20–17
37	November 30, 1963	Tempe	Arizona State	35–6
38	November 28, 1964	Tucson	Arizona	30–6
39	November 27, 1965	Tempe	Arizona State	14–6
40	November 26, 1966	Tucson	Arizona State	20–17
41	November 25, 1967	Tempe	Arizona State	47–7
42	November 30, 1968	Tucson	#20 Arizona State	30–7
43	November 29, 1969	Tempe	Arizona State	38–24
44	December 5, 1970	Tucson	#9 Arizona State	10–6
45	November 27, 1971	Tempe	#9 Arizona State	31–0
46	November 25, 1972	Tucson	#18 Arizona State	38–21
47	November 25, 1973	Tempe	#13 Arizona State	55–19
48	November 30, 1974	Tucson	Arizona	10–0
49	November 29, 1975	Tempe	#8 Arizona State	24–21
50	November 27, 1976	Tucson	Arizona State	27–10
51	November 26, 1977	Tempe	#19 Arizona State	23–7

No.	Date	Location	Winner	Score
52	November 25, 1978	Tucson	Arizona State	18–17
53	November 24, 1979	Tempe	Arizona	27–24
54	November 29, 1980	Tucson	Arizona State	44–7
55	November 28, 1981	Tempe	#18 Arizona State	24–13
56	November 27, 1982	Tucson	Arizona	28–18
57	November 26, 1983	Tempe	Arizona	17–15
58	November 24, 1984	Tucson	Arizona	16–10
59	November 23, 1985	Tempe	Arizona	16–13
60	November 22, 1986	Tucson	#14 Arizona	34–17
61	November 28, 1987	Tempe	Tie	24–24
62	November 26, 1988	Tucson	Arizona	28–18
63	November 25, 1989	Tempe	Arizona	28–10
64	November 24, 1990	Tucson	Arizona	21–17
65	November 23, 1991	Tempe	Arizona State	37–14
66	November 21, 1992	Tucson	Arizona State	7–6
67	November 26, 1993	Tempe	#19 Arizona	34–20
68	November 25, 1994	Tucson	#16 Arizona	28–27
69	November 24, 1995	Tempe	Arizona	31–28
70	November 23, 1996	Tucson	#4 Arizona State	56–14
71	November 28, 1997	Tempe	Arizona	28–16
72	November 27, 1998	Tucson	#8 Arizona	50–42
73	November 27, 1999	Tempe	Arizona State	42–27
74	November 24, 2000	Tucson	Arizona State	30–17
75	November 23, 2001	Tempe	Arizona	34–21
76	November 29, 2002	Tucson	Arizona State	34–20
77	November 28, 2003	Tempe	Arizona State	28–7
78	November 26, 2004	Tucson	Arizona	34–27
79	November 25, 2005	Tempe	Arizona State	23–20
80	November 25, 2006	Tucson	Arizona State	28–14
81	December 1, 2007	Tempe	#13 Arizona State	20–17
82	December 6, 2008	Tucson	Arizona	31–10
83	November 28, 2009	Tempe	Arizona	20–17
84	December 2, 2010	Tucson	Arizona State	30–29^{2OT}
85	November 19, 2011	Tempe	Arizona	31–27
86	November 23, 2012	Tucson	Arizona State	41–34
87	November 30, 2013	Tempe	#13 Arizona State	58–21
88	November 28, 2014	Tucson	#12 Arizona	42–35
89	November 21, 2015	Tempe	Arizona State	52–37
90	November 25, 2016	Tucson	Arizona	56–35
91	November 25, 2017	Tempe	Arizona State	42–30
92	November 24, 2018	Tucson	Arizona State	41–40
93	November 30, 2019	Tempe	Arizona State	24–14
94	December 11, 2020	Tucson	Arizona State	70–7
95	November 27, 2021	Tempe	Arizona State	38–15†
96	November 25, 2022	Tucson	Arizona	38–35
97	November 25, 2023	Tempe	#15 Arizona	59–23
98	November 30, 2024	Tucson	#16 Arizona State	49–7
99	November 28, 2025	Tempe	#25 Arizona	23–7
100	November 28, 2026	Tucson		
Series: Arizona leads 52–45–1
† Arizona State vacated 2021 win due to NCAA violations.

=== Results by location ===
City	Games	Arizona victories	Arizona State victories	Tied games	Years played
Tucson	54	32	22	0	1899–present
Tempe	43	19	22	1	1936–present
Phoenix	2	1	1	0	1931–1933

=== Ranked games ===
Since 1936, when the AP Poll began being released continuously, the Wildcats and Sun Devils have met 5 times when both have been ranked in the top 25. The first instance came in 1968, with the most recent in 2025.

Arizona holds a 3–2–0 record in these top-25 meetings.

Year	Away team		Home team		Notes
1968	No. 19 Arizona	7	No. 20 Arizona State	30	
1975	No. 12 Arizona	21	No. 8 Arizona State	24	
1986	No. 14 Arizona	34	No. 4 Arizona State	17	
2014	No. 11 Arizona	42	No. 13 Arizona State	35	
2025	No. 25 Arizona	23	No. 20 Arizona State	7	

=== Pac−10/12 & Big 12 Era ===
In Pac-12 Conference play, Arizona won the series 23–21–1. Both schools joined the Pac-12 conference in 1978 until their final season in 2023, which the Wildcats won 59–23. At the start of the 2024 season both schools joined the Big 12 Conference and the series is currently tied 1–1, with the Wildcats winning the most recent match up 23–7.

Football Comparison
	Arizona	Arizona State
First Season	1899	1897
Playoff appearances	0	1
New Year's Six appearances	1	1
Bowl appearances	23	34
Bowl record	10–12–1	15–18–1
Conference titles	6	18
Division titles	1	1
Consensus All-Americans	16	16
All-time program record	646−512−33	657−432−24

== See also ==
- Arizona–Arizona State men's basketball rivalry
- Arizona–Arizona State baseball rivalry
- List of NCAA college football rivalry games
