= Arizona–Arizona State baseball rivalry =

College baseball rivalry

- Arizona Wildcats Arizona State Sun Devils
- Sport: College Baseball
- First meeting: 1912
- Latest meeting: April 13, 2026; Arizona 5 – Arizona State 3
- Next meeting: TBD
- Stadiums: Hi Corbett Field, Tucson; Phoenix Municipal Stadium, Phoenix

Statistics
- Total meetings: 505
- All-time series: Arizona leads, 267–237–1
- Largest victory: Arizona State by 29 (March 4, 2000)
- Current win streak: Arizona, 1 (April 13, 2026–present)

Locations of Arizona and Arizona State

The Arizona–Arizona State baseball rivalry is a college baseball rivalry between the University of Arizona Wildcats and the Arizona State University Sun Devils. Both programs are two of the most storied and successful in college baseball history, combining for a total of 9 College World Series championships, 40 College World Series appearances, 82 NCAA tournament appearances and 27 conference regular-season championships.

Baseball Comparison
	Arizona	Arizona State
First Season	1904	1959
College World Series Championships	4	5
College World Series Appearances	19	22†
NCAA tournament Appearances	44	41†
Conference Championships	7	20†
Conference Tournament championships	2	0
†Arizona State was forced by the NCAA to vacate 44 wins from its 2007 season due to recruiting violations.

== History ==
=== Early history ===
The baseball rivalry did not develop until the 1950s after ASU created its baseball program in 1959. Beginning with Bobby Winkles' tenure, Arizona State took the lead in the series against Arizona and has never yielded that lead, appeared in the College World Series twice and had won its 1st College World Series championship - something Arizona had yet to do in 7 College World Series appearances to that point. Before the end of the decade the Sun Devils would win two more College World Series in 1967 and 1969.

=== The Brock–Kindall years ===
Under the helms of Jim Brock and Jerry Kindall, the rivalry reached a new level of intensity. Longtime sports columnist Greg Hansen of the Arizona Daily Star described the rivalry between Brock and Kindall as the greatest between any Arizona-Arizona State coaching duo in any sport. During the 1970s and early 1980s, the teams reached the peak of their joint prominence: the Wildcats and Sun Devils would win College World Series titles back-to-back with each other in 1976–77 and 1980–81. Perhaps the most important game played between the two was a 1976 College World Series semi-final matchup (see below) in which Arizona defeated Arizona State 5–1 to advance to the College World Series title game against Eastern Michigan, ending Arizona State's season. The Wildcats won their first College World Series title the next game.

=== 1990s–present ===
In recent years the rivalry has been dominated in stretches by each team. Arizona State generally dominated the rivalry in the 1990s and 2000s, making many College World Series appearances while Arizona struggled and made only a single one - in 2004.

The 2010s were however dominated by Arizona, who have made 3 College World Series appearances since the Sun Devils' last appearance - winning once and running-up once. The Wildcats have also won 3 Pac-12 titles since the Sun Devils' last in 2010.

In 2025, Arizona and Arizona State baseball teams now compete in the Big 12 Conference after 46 years as members of the then Pac-10 and Pac-12 Conference.

== Venues ==
Aside from 6 games, each game in the series has been played either at the Wildcats' home fields in Tucson or the Sun Devils' home fields in Phoenix and Tempe. In fact, only a single regular season game has been played outside of the state of Arizona - a 1994 matchup held at the Hubert H. Humphrey Metrodome in Minneapolis, MN.

Arizona's home field was UA Field from 1929 to 1966, Wildcat Field (later Frank Sancet Stadium then Jerry Kindall Field at Frank Sancet Stadium) from 1967 to 2011 and Hi Corbett Field from 2012–Present. Arizona played selected home games at Hi Corbett Field from 1940 to 1975, including all games against Arizona State between 1965 and 1974.

Arizona State's home field was Goodwin Stadium from 1959 to 1963, Phoenix Municipal Stadium from 1964 to 1973 and Packard Stadium from 1974 to 2014. In 2015, the Sun Devils returned to Phoenix Municipal Stadium where they remain today. Arizona State played the 2002 season at HoHoKam Park in Mesa, AZ due to construction at Packard Stadium, however the only games played that season between the teams were held in Tucson.

== Coaching record comparison ==
Arizona			Arizona State		
Coach	Years	Record v. Arizona State	Coach	Years	Record v. Arizona
Frank Sancet	1950–1972	63–47 (.573)	Bobby Winkles	1959–1971	39–34 (.534)
Jerry Kindall	1973–1996	70–93–1 (.427)	Jim Brock	1972–1994	91–53–1 (.628)
Jerry Stitt	1997–2001	10–17 (.370)	Pat Murphy	1995–2009	47–26 (.644)
Andy Lopez	2002–2015	26–37 (.413)	Tim Esmay	2010–2014	14–11 (.560)
Jay Johnson	2016–2021	12–10 (.545)	Tracy Smith	2015–2021	12–14 (.462)
Chip Hale	2022–Present	12–11 (.521)	Willie Bloomquist	2022–Present	11–12 (.478)

== Games played ==
The Wildcats and Sun Devils have been members of the same conference since 1931 - the Border Conference from 1931 to 1962, Western Athletic Conference from 1962 to 1978, Pacific-10 (later Pac-12) Conference from 1978 to 2024, and Big 12 Conference from 2025 to Present. From 1963 to 2000, the teams played 6 conference games a year. Since 2001 the Wildcats and Sun Devils have played 3 conference games a season - alternating hosts each year - usually supplemented with a pair of non-conference matchups hosted by the team not hosting the conference games. Over the years the Wildcats and Sun Devils have also participated in multi-year events against each other:

- From 1977 to 1978 Arizona and Arizona State jointly hosted the Best in the West Tournament in Tucson and Tempe; participating teams included Eastern Michigan, Grand Canyon, Northern Arizona, Oregon State and Pepperdine.
- From 2006 to 2007 Arizona and Arizona State participated in the Challenge at Chase - a yearly neutral site game held at the Arizona Diamondbacks' home Chase Field in Phoenix, AZ.

=== Notable games ===
- May 14, 1966 (Hi Corbett Field - Tucson, AZ): Arizona and Arizona State faced off with the WAC South championship at stake. Arizona won 6–1 to claim the championship. The Wildcats would go on to appear in the College World Series.
- May 21, 1967 (Phoenix Municipal Stadium - Phoenix, AZ): In another game with the WAC South championship at stake, future MLB pitcher Gary Gentry pitched all 15 innings for Arizona State as the Sun Devils clinched the championship in a 3–2 victory. ASU would go on to win its 2nd College World Series title.
- April 18, 1975 (Wildcat Field - Tucson, AZ): In the first night game in Wildcat Field history, Arizona State defeated Arizona 9–1. Arizona State pitcher Floyd Bannister struck out 17 and took a no-hit bid into the 8th inning.
- June 17, 1976 (Johnny Rosenblatt Stadium - Omaha, NE): In perhaps the most important game played in the rivalry's history, Arizona and Arizona State played each other in a College World Series elimination game to decide which team would play Eastern Michigan in the national title game. This was the second of only two postseason games played between the two all-time, the first having been 5 days earlier in which Arizona State had won 7–6 in controversial fashion (Arizona catcher Ron Hassey was called out at 3rd in a close play in the 10th inning that stemmed off an Arizona comeback attempt). Arizona pitcher Steve Powers faced off against Arizona State starting pitcher Don Hanna, who had a 15–0 record to that point. Powers pitched the entire game and allowed only 1 run as Arizona won 5–1 to advance to their 4th College World Series title game, ending Arizona State's season. Sun Devils coach Jim Brock described the loss as being so painful that "[i]t was like a death in the family." Arizona would go on to win their first national championship the next day, with Powers being named College World Series MVP.
- February 27, 1982 (Packard Stadium - Tempe, AZ): The only tie in series history, 4-4.
- March 6, 1994 (Hubert H. Humphrey Metrodome - Minneapolis, MN): The only regular season matchup ever played outside of the state of Arizona as part of the Metrodome Classic. Arizona State won 12–4. The Sun Devils advanced on the College World Series for the 2nd straight season.
- March 4, 2000 (Packard Stadium - Tempe, AZ): Arizona State defeats Arizona 32–3 in the largest victory in series history.
- May 27, 2012 (Hi Corbett Field - Tucson, AZ): Having squandered an early 7–1 lead, Arizona defeated Arizona State 8–7 on a 2-out walk-off single from Wildcats left fielder Johnny Field to clinch their first Pac-12 Conference championship (shared with UCLA) since 1992. The Wildcats would go on to win their first College World Series title since 1986, and 4th overall.

=== Scores of games (1959–2026) ===
Arizona victories	Arizona State victories	Tie games

No.	Date	Location	Winner	Score
1	April 11, 1959	Tucson, AZ	Arizona	10–1
2	April 11, 1959	Tucson, AZ	Arizona	6–3
3	May 2, 1959	Tempe, AZ	Arizona State	3–2
4	May 2, 1959	Tempe, AZ	Arizona	9–1
5	April 30, 1960	Tempe, AZ	Arizona State	7–3
6	April 30, 1960	Tempe, AZ	Arizona State	3–0
7	May 7, 1960	Tucson, AZ	Arizona	6–2
8	May 7, 1960	Tucson, AZ	Arizona	7–6
9	April 29, 1961	Tucson, AZ	Arizona	10–2
10	April 29, 1961	Tucson, AZ	Arizona	7–2
11	May 6, 1961	Tempe, AZ	Arizona State	12–10
12	May 6, 1961	Tempe, AZ	Arizona	3–1
13	March 30, 1962	Tempe, AZ	Arizona	4–1
14	March 31, 1962	Tempe, AZ	Arizona	3–2
15	March 31, 1962	Tempe, AZ	Arizona State	7–2
16	May 4, 1962	Tucson, AZ	Arizona	6–2
17	May 5, 1962	Tucson, AZ	Arizona State	5–1
18	May 5, 1962	Tucson, AZ	Arizona State	20–7
19	April 5, 1963	Tucson, AZ	Arizona	6–2
20	April 6, 1963	Tucson, AZ	Arizona	9–8
21	April 6, 1963	Tucson, AZ	Arizona State	2–0
22	May 3, 1963	Tucson, AZ	Arizona State	3–2
23	May 4, 1963	Tempe, AZ	Arizona	3–2
24	May 4, 1963	Tempe, AZ	Arizona	9–5
25	April 10, 1964	Phoenix, AZ	Arizona State	5–3
26	April 11, 1964	Phoenix, AZ	Arizona State	17–9
27	April 11, 1964	Phoenix, AZ	Arizona State	9–4
28	May 1, 1964	Tucson, AZ	Arizona	1–0
29	May 2, 1964	Tucson, AZ	Arizona State	3–2
30	May 2, 1964	Tucson, AZ	Arizona State	6–2
31	April 23, 1965	Tucson, AZ	Arizona	12–3
32	April 24, 1965	Tucson, AZ	Arizona	4–1
33	April 24, 1965	Tucson, AZ	Arizona State	10–4
34	May 14, 1965	Phoenix, AZ	Arizona State	6–0
35	May 15, 1965	Phoenix, AZ	Arizona State	13–5
36	May 15, 1965	Phoenix, AZ	Arizona State	6–2
37	April 15, 1966	Phoenix, AZ	Arizona State	7–3
38	April 16, 1966	Phoenix, AZ	Arizona	4–1
39	April 16, 1966	Phoenix, AZ	Arizona State	13–5
40	May 13, 1966	Tucson, AZ	Arizona	1–0
41	May 14, 1966	Tucson, AZ	Arizona State	5–4
42	May 14, 1966	Tucson, AZ	Arizona	6–1
43	April 14, 1967	Tucson, AZ	Arizona	3–2
44	April 15, 1967	Tucson, AZ	Arizona	6–0
45	April 15, 1967	Tucson, AZ	Arizona State	3–0
46	May 19, 1967	Phoenix, AZ	Arizona State	3–0
47	May 20, 1967	Phoenix, AZ	Arizona State	3–0
48	May 20, 1967	Phoenix, AZ	Arizona	7–2
49	May 21, 1967	Phoenix, AZ	Arizona State	3–2
50	May 3, 1968	Phoenix, AZ	Arizona State	2–1
51	May 4, 1968	Phoenix, AZ	Arizona	5–4
52	May 4, 1968	Phoenix, AZ	Arizona State	4–1
53	May 17, 1968	Tucson, AZ	Arizona	6–1
54	May 18, 1968	Tucson, AZ	Arizona	8–2
55	May 18, 1968	Tucson, AZ	Arizona State	6–1
56	April 11, 1969	Tucson, AZ	Arizona State	4–3
57	April 12, 1969	Tucson, AZ	Arizona State	11–7
58	April 12, 1969	Tucson, AZ	Arizona	5–4
59	May 2, 1969	Phoenix, AZ	Arizona	2–0
60	May 3, 1969	Phoenix, AZ	Arizona State	11–0
61	May 3, 1969	Phoenix, AZ	Arizona State	5–0
62	May 1, 1970	Phoenix, AZ	Arizona	3–2
63	May 2, 1970	Phoenix, AZ	Arizona	6–4
64	May 2, 1970	Phoenix, AZ	Arizona State	13–12
65	May 15, 1970	Tucson, AZ	Arizona	7–3
66	May 16, 1970	Tucson, AZ	Arizona	4–0
67	May 16, 1970	Tucson, AZ	Arizona	9–3
68	April 16, 1971	Tucson, AZ	Arizona State	1–0
69	April 17, 1971	Tucson, AZ	Arizona State	6–3
70	April 17, 1971	Tucson, AZ	Arizona State	6–5
71	April 30, 1971	Phoenix, AZ	Arizona State	7–3
72	May 1, 1971	Phoenix, AZ	Arizona State	11–2
73	May 1, 1971	Phoenix, AZ	Arizona State	9–8
74	April 20, 1972	Phoenix, AZ	Arizona State	5–4
75	April 21, 1972	Phoenix, AZ	Arizona State	5–4
76	April 22, 1972	Phoenix, AZ	Arizona State	18–3
77	May 11, 1972	Tucson, AZ	Arizona State	6–0
78	May 12, 1972	Tucson, AZ	Arizona State	9–4
79	May 13, 1972	Tucson, AZ	Arizona State	7–3
80	April 5, 1973	Tucson, AZ	Arizona State	9–2
81	April 6, 1973	Tucson, AZ	Arizona State	13–10
82	April 7, 1973	Tucson, AZ	Arizona State	7–4
83	May 10, 1973	Phoenix, AZ	Arizona State	10–7
84	May 11, 1973	Phoenix, AZ	Arizona State	14–1
85	May 12, 1973	Phoenix, AZ	Arizona	5–4
86	April 18, 1974	Tempe, AZ	Arizona	6–0
87	April 19, 1974	Tempe, AZ	Arizona	6–4
88	April 20, 1974	Tempe, AZ	Arizona State	6–3
89	May 9, 1974	Tucson, AZ	Arizona	14–3
90	May 10, 1974	Tucson, AZ	Arizona	14–9
91	May 11, 1974	Tucson, AZ	Arizona	11–1
92	April 18, 1975	Tucson, AZ	Arizona State	9–1

No.	Date	Location	Winner	Score
93	April 19, 1975	Tucson, AZ	Arizona State	17–7
94	April 20, 1975	Tucson, AZ	Arizona State	17–7
95	May 8, 1975	Tempe, AZ	Arizona	7–0
96	May 9, 1975	Tempe, AZ	Arizona State	8–4
97	May 10, 1975	Tempe, AZ	Arizona	12–4
98	April 8, 1976	Tempe, AZ	Arizona State	7–2
99	April 9, 1976	Tempe, AZ	Arizona State	11–9
100	April 10, 1976	Tempe, AZ	Arizona State	6–5
101	May 13, 1976	Tempe, AZ	Arizona State	2–1
102	May 14, 1976	Tucson, AZ	Arizona State	9–4
103	May 15, 1976	Tucson, AZ	Arizona State	14–9
104	June 12, 1976^{[A]}	Omaha, NE	Arizona State	7–6
105	June 17, 1976^{[A]}	Omaha, NE	Arizona	5–1
106	March 23, 1977^{[B]}	Tucson, AZ	Arizona	9–8
107	March 26, 1977^{[B]}	Tempe, AZ	Arizona State	8–7
108	April 21, 1977	Tucson, AZ	Arizona	9–6
109	April 22, 1977	Tucson, AZ	Arizona State	10–4
110	April 23, 1977	Tucson, AZ	Arizona State	13–6
111	May 11, 1977	Tempe, AZ	Arizona State	5–4
112	May 12, 1977	Tempe, AZ	Arizona State	7–2
113	May 14, 1977	Tempe, AZ	Arizona State	11–7
114	March 15, 1978^{[B]}	Tempe, AZ	Arizona State	8–1
115	March 19, 1978^{[B]}	Tucson, AZ	Arizona State	7–4
116	April 20, 1978	Tempe, AZ	Arizona State	15–9
117	April 21, 1978	Tempe, AZ	Arizona State	10–8
118	April 22, 1978	Tempe, AZ	Arizona State	11–10
119	May 11, 1978	Tucson, AZ	Arizona	5–3
120	May 12, 1978	Tucson, AZ	Arizona	10–7
121	May 13, 1978	Tucson, AZ	Arizona State	11–6
122	April 5, 1979	Tucson, AZ	Arizona	10–4
123	April 6, 1979	Tucson, AZ	Arizona	12–9
124	April 7, 1979	Tucson, AZ	Arizona	8–5
125	May 10, 1979	Tempe, AZ	Arizona	12–1
126	May 11, 1979	Tempe, AZ	Arizona	9–5
127	May 12, 1979	Tempe, AZ	Arizona	6–4
128	April 3, 1980	Tempe, AZ	Arizona State	3–2
129	April 4, 1980	Tempe, AZ	Arizona	11–5
130	April 5, 1980	Tempe, AZ	Arizona	14–7
131	May 8, 1980	Tucson, AZ	Arizona State	14–8
132	May 9, 1980	Tucson, AZ	Arizona State	8–6
133	May 10, 1980	Tucson, AZ	Arizona	22–4
134	April 2, 1981	Tucson, AZ	Arizona	9–4
135	April 3, 1981	Tucson, AZ	Arizona State	10–8
136	April 4, 1981	Tucson, AZ	Arizona State	23–11
137	May 7, 1981	Tempe, AZ	Arizona State	10–6
138	May 8, 1981	Tempe, AZ	Arizona State	13–4
139	May 9, 1981	Tempe, AZ	Arizona State	6–5
140	February 26, 1982	Tempe, AZ	Arizona	8–5
141	February 27, 1982	Tempe, AZ	Tie	4–4
142	February 28, 1982	Tempe, AZ	Arizona State	9–5
143	May 13, 1982	Tucson, AZ	Arizona State	6–4
144	May 14, 1982	Tucson, AZ	Arizona State	7–4
145	May 15, 1982	Tucson, AZ	Arizona	5–4
146	April 7, 1983	Tucson, AZ	Arizona	4–3
147	April 8, 1983	Tucson, AZ	Arizona State	14–7
148	April 9, 1983	Tucson, AZ	Arizona State	3–2
149	May 11, 1983	Tempe, AZ	Arizona State	9–5
150	May 12, 1983	Tempe, AZ	Arizona	5–2
151	May 13, 1983	Tempe, AZ	Arizona	5–3
152	March 9, 1984	Tempe, AZ	Arizona State	7–4
153	March 10, 1984	Tempe, AZ	Arizona State	11–1
154	March 11, 1984	Tempe, AZ	Arizona State	7–2
155	May 11, 1984	Tucson, AZ	Arizona State	8–5
156	May 12, 1984	Tucson, AZ	Arizona State	6–4
157	May 13, 1984	Tucson, AZ	Arizona	9–5
158	April 5, 1985	Tucson, AZ	Arizona	13–12
159	April 6, 1985	Tucson, AZ	Arizona State	19–10
160	April 7, 1985	Tucson, AZ	Arizona	11–4
161	May 10, 1985	Tempe, AZ	Arizona State	13–3
162	May 11, 1985	Tempe, AZ	Arizona	7–5
163	May 12, 1985	Tempe, AZ	Arizona State	15–3
164	April 11, 1986	Tempe, AZ	Arizona State	12–9
165	April 12, 1986	Tempe, AZ	Arizona	5–3
166	April 13, 1986	Tempe, AZ	Arizona State	6–5
167	May 16, 1986	Tucson, AZ	Arizona	9–4
168	May 17, 1986	Tucson, AZ	Arizona	18–2
169	May 18, 1986	Tucson, AZ	Arizona	22–11
170	March 20, 1987	Tucson, AZ	Arizona State	8–5
171	March 21, 1987	Tucson, AZ	Arizona State	10–2
172	March 23, 1987	Tucson, AZ	Arizona State	15–4
173	May 15, 1987	Tempe, AZ	Arizona State	2–1
174	May 16, 1987	Tempe, AZ	Arizona State	3–2
175	May 17, 1987	Tempe, AZ	Arizona State	5–4
176	April 1, 1988	Tempe, AZ	Arizona State	5–4
177	April 2, 1988	Tempe, AZ	Arizona State	18–3
178	April 4, 1988	Tempe, AZ	Arizona State	6–3
179	May 13, 1988	Tucson, AZ	Arizona State	14–2
180	May 14, 1988	Tucson, AZ	Arizona State	11–7
181	May 15, 1988	Tucson, AZ	Arizona	9–6
182	March 23, 1989	Tucson, AZ	Arizona	5–3
183	March 24, 1989	Tucson, AZ	Arizona State	3–2
184	March 25, 1989	Tucson, AZ	Arizona State	16–6

No.	Date	Location	Winner	Score
185	May 12, 1989	Tempe, AZ	Arizona	10–6
186	May 13, 1989	Tempe, AZ	Arizona	9–4
187	May 14, 1989	Tempe, AZ	Arizona	10–0
188	March 16, 1990	Tempe, AZ	Arizona State	3–0
189	March 17, 1990	Tempe, AZ	Arizona State	3–1
190	March 18, 1990	Tempe, AZ	Arizona State	9–2
191	May 11, 1990	Tucson, AZ	Arizona	2–1
192	May 12, 1990	Tucson, AZ	Arizona State	6–4
193	May 13, 1990	Tucson, AZ	Arizona State	5–4
194	March 22, 1991	Tempe, AZ	Arizona	9–8
195	March 23, 1991	Tucson, AZ	Arizona State	7–3
196	March 24, 1991	Tucson, AZ	Arizona	16–3
197	May 10, 1991	Tempe, AZ	Arizona State	8–4
198	May 11, 1991	Tempe, AZ	Arizona State	3–2
199	May 12, 1991	Tempe, AZ	Arizona State	9–8
200	April 3, 1992	Tempe, AZ	Arizona State	7–6
201	April 4, 1992	Tempe, AZ	Arizona	6–4
202	April 5, 1992	Tempe, AZ	Arizona State	8–7
203	May 15, 1992	Tucson, AZ	Arizona	9–3
204	May 16, 1992	Tucson, AZ	Arizona	9–8
205	May 17, 1992	Tucson, AZ	Arizona	4–3
206	April 2, 1993	Tempe, AZ	Arizona State	9–7
207	April 3, 1993	Tucson, AZ	Arizona	9–5
208	April 4, 1993	Tucson, AZ	Arizona	10–9
209	May 14, 1993	Tucson, AZ	Arizona	11–10
210	May 16, 1993	Tempe, AZ	Arizona State	11–6
211	May 16, 1993	Tempe, AZ	Arizona State	6–1
212	March 6, 1994^{[C]}	Minneapolis, MN	Arizona State	12–4
213	March 11, 1994	Tempe, AZ	Arizona State	16–6
214	March 12, 1994	Tucson, AZ	Arizona State	7–5
215	March 13, 1994	Tucson, AZ	Arizona	8–7
216	April 8, 1994	Tucson, AZ	Arizona	8–2
217	April 9, 1994	Tempe, AZ	Arizona State	4–2
218	April 10, 1994	Tempe, AZ	Arizona State	15–4
219	March 3, 1995	Tucson, AZ	Arizona	9–8
220	March 4, 1995	Tempe, AZ	Arizona State	5–2
221	March 5, 1995	Tempe, AZ	Arizona State	11–7
222	April 21, 1995	Tempe, AZ	Arizona State	7–0
223	April 22, 1995	Tucson, AZ	Arizona State	6–4
224	April 23, 1995	Tucson, AZ	Arizona	7–6
225	March 22, 1996	Tempe, AZ	Arizona State	8–7
226	March 23, 1996	Tempe, AZ	Arizona State	16–11
227	March 24, 1996	Tempe, AZ	Arizona	15–7
228	May 11, 1996	Tucson, AZ	Arizona	14–13
229	May 12, 1996	Tucson, AZ	Arizona State	20–16
230	May 13, 1996	Tucson, AZ	Arizona State	16–3
231	March 21, 1997	Tucson, AZ	Arizona State	8–6
232	March 22, 1997	Tucson, AZ	Arizona	5–4
233	March 23, 1997	Tucson, AZ	Arizona State	11–7
234	April 25, 1997	Tempe, AZ	Arizona State	7–5
235	April 26, 1997	Tempe, AZ	Arizona	6–4
236	April 27, 1997	Tempe, AZ	Arizona	8–3
237	April 3, 1998	Tucson, AZ	Arizona State	4–3
238	April 4, 1998	Tucson, AZ	Arizona State	20–12
239	April 5, 1998	Tucson, AZ	Arizona State	12–4
240	April 24, 1998	Tempe, AZ	Arizona	8–7
241	April 25, 1998	Tempe, AZ	Arizona State	16–13
242	April 26, 1998	Tempe, AZ	Arizona	10–9
243	February 28, 1999	Tucson, AZ	Arizona	9–8
244	February 28, 1999	Tucson, AZ	#15 Arizona State	11–9
245	February 28, 1999	Tucson, AZ	#15 Arizona State	18–3
246	May 14, 1999	Tempe, AZ	Arizona	13–5
247	May 15, 1999	Tempe, AZ	#25 Arizona State	22–9
248	May 16, 1999	Tempe, AZ	Arizona	6–2
249	March 3, 2000	Tempe, AZ	#18 Arizona State	9–7
250	March 4, 2000	Tempe, AZ	#18 Arizona State	32–3
251	March 5, 2000	Tempe, AZ	#18 Arizona State	14–8
252	May 19, 2000	Tucson, AZ	Arizona	19–11
253	May 20, 2000	Tucson, AZ	#4 Arizona State	11–4
254	May 21, 2000	Tucson, AZ	#4 Arizona State	24–10
255	April 27, 2001	Tempe, AZ	#19 Arizona State	7–4
256	April 28, 2001	Tempe, AZ	Arizona	3–1
257	April 29, 2001	Tempe, AZ	#19 Arizona State	6–5
258	March 23, 2002	Tucson, AZ	#20 Arizona State	9–7
259	March 23, 2002	Tucson, AZ	#20 Arizona State	10–6
260	March 24, 2002	Tucson, AZ	Arizona	10–1
261	May 23, 2003	Tempe, AZ	#4 Arizona State	5–2
262	May 24, 2003	Tempe, AZ	#4 Arizona State	16–0
263	May 25, 2003	Tempe, AZ	#4 Arizona State	15–2
264	February 24, 2004	Tempe, AZ	Arizona State	4–0
265	April 12, 2004	Tempe, AZ	Arizona State	9–5
266	May 21, 2004	Tucson, AZ	#17 Arizona State	8–3
267	May 22, 2004	Tucson, AZ	#17 Arizona State	7–2
268	May 23, 2004	Tucson, AZ	Arizona	13–7
269	February 23, 2005	Tucson, AZ	#10 Arizona	11–5
270	May 14, 2005	Tempe, AZ	#17 Arizona State	6–2
271	May 15, 2005	Tempe, AZ	#7 Arizona	16–7
272	May 16, 2005	Tempe, AZ	#7 Arizona	18–1
273	April 2, 2006^{[D]}	Phoenix, AZ	Arizona	12–8
274	May 2, 2006	Tempe, AZ	#20 Arizona State	22–8
275	May 19, 2006	Tucson, AZ	#14 Arizona State	15–6
276	May 20, 2006	Tucson, AZ	Arizona	18–12

No.	Date	Location	Winner	Score
277	May 21, 2006	Tucson, AZ	Arizona	5–4
278	February 27, 2007	Tucson, AZ	#12 Arizona State	22–8
279	March 28, 2007^{[D]}	Phoenix, AZ	#23 Arizona	6–5
280	May 25, 2007	Tempe, AZ	#6 Arizona State	8–5
281	May 26, 2007	Tempe, AZ	#6 Arizona State	8–7
282	May 27, 2007	Tempe, AZ	#11 Arizona	14–5
283	March 18, 2008	Tempe, AZ	#1 Arizona State	6–5
284	May 22, 2008	Tucson, AZ	#2 Arizona State	13–6
285	May 23, 2008	Tucson, AZ	Arizona	4–3
286	May 24, 2008	Tucson, AZ	Arizona	7–4
287	March 20, 2009	Tempe, AZ	#4 Arizona State	4–1
288	March 21, 2009	Tempe, AZ	#4 Arizona State	7–3
289	March 22, 2009	Tempe, AZ	#4 Arizona State	23–9
290	April 29, 2009	Tucson, AZ	#3 Arizona State	20–3
291	May 20, 2009	Tucson, AZ	Arizona State	9–3
292	April 20, 2010	Tempe, AZ	#17 Arizona	4–2
293	May 4, 2010	Tempe, AZ	#2 Arizona State	13–1
294	May 15, 2010	Tucson, AZ	#2 Arizona State	12–4
295	May 16, 2010	Tucson, AZ	Arizona	12–4
296	May 17, 2010	Tucson, AZ	#2 Arizona State	4–2
297	March 25, 2011	Tempe, AZ	#15 Arizona	5–2
298	March 26, 2011	Tempe, AZ	#6 Arizona State	5–1
299	March 27, 2011	Tucson, AZ	#6 Arizona State	8–1
300	April 5, 2011	Tucson, AZ	#5 Arizona State	10–5
301	April 26, 2011	Tucson, AZ	#8 Arizona State	4–3
302	April 17, 2012	Tempe, AZ	Arizona State	12–8
303	May 16, 2012	Tempe, AZ	#17 Arizona	10–2
304	May 25, 2012	Tucson, AZ	#13 Arizona	1–0
305	May 26, 2012	Tucson, AZ	Arizona State	9–7
306	May 27, 2012	Tucson, AZ	#13 Arizona	8–7
307	April 16, 2013	Tucson, AZ	#25 Arizona	10–9
308	April 30, 2013	Tucson, AZ	#16 Arizona State	7–5
309	May 17, 2013	Tempe, AZ	Arizona	10–7
310	May 18, 2013	Tempe, AZ	#15 Arizona State	6–3
311	May 19, 2013	Tempe, AZ	Arizona	7–6
312	March 26, 2014	Tempe, AZ	Arizona State	14–6
313	April 9, 2014	Tempe, AZ	Arizona	10–9
314	April 25, 2014	Tucson, AZ	Arizona State	2–1
315	April 26, 2014	Tucson, AZ	Arizona State	7–0
316	April 27, 2014	Tucson, AZ	Arizona	6–1
317	April 11, 2015	Phoenix, AZ	#9 Arizona State	5–4
318	April 12, 2015	Phoenix, AZ	#9 Arizona State	13–7
319	April 12, 2015	Phoenix, AZ	#24 Arizona	7–2
320	April 22, 2015	Tucson, AZ	#12 Arizona State	6–5
321	April 28, 2015	Tucson, AZ	Arizona	17–6
322	April 26, 2016	Phoenix, AZ	#17 Arizona	8–0
323	May 13, 2016	Tucson, AZ	Arizona State	5–2
324	May 14, 2016	Tucson, AZ	#17 Arizona	4–2
325	May 15, 2016	Tucson, AZ	Arizona State	5–1
326	April 4, 2017	Tucson, AZ	#8 Arizona	11–2
327	May 9, 2017	Tucson, AZ	Arizona State	14–13
328	May 18, 2017	Phoenix, AZ	#18 Arizona	6–5
329	May 19, 2017	Phoenix, AZ	#18 Arizona	3–1
330	May 20, 2017	Phoenix, AZ	#18 Arizona	9–5
331	March 13, 2018	Phoenix, AZ	Arizona	6–2
332	May 17, 2018	Tucson, AZ	Arizona	6–4
333	May 18, 2018	Tucson, AZ	Arizona State	10–5
334	May 19, 2018	Tucson, AZ	Arizona	10–9
335	March 29, 2019	Phoenix, AZ	#9 Arizona State	8–2
336	March 30, 2019	Phoenix, AZ	#9 Arizona State	8–3
337	March 31, 2019	Phoenix, AZ	#9 Arizona State	17–16
338	May 7, 2019	Tucson, AZ	#22 Arizona State	10–7
339	April 1, 2021	Phoenix, AZ	#19 Arizona	10–5
340	April 2, 2021	Phoenix, AZ	#19 Arizona	7–6
341	April 3, 2021	Phoenix, AZ	#14 Arizona State	3–2
342	April 6, 2021	Tucson, AZ	#16 Arizona	14–2
343	April 5, 2022	Phoenix, AZ	Arizona State	10–6
344	April 22, 2022	Tucson, AZ	Arizona	7–6
345	April 23, 2022	Tucson, AZ	Arizona State	8–5
346	April 24, 2022	Tucson, AZ	Arizona	14–4
347	May 27, 2022^{[E]}	Scottsdale, AZ	Arizona	8–6
348	March 24, 2023	Phoenix, AZ	Arizona State	6–5
349	March 25, 2023	Phoenix, AZ	Arizona State	7–4
350	March 26, 2023	Phoenix, AZ	Arizona State	10–6
351	April 19, 2023	Tucson, AZ	Arizona	20–0
352	May 23, 2023^{[E]}	Scottsdale, AZ	Arizona	12–3
353	March 15, 2024	Tucson, AZ	Arizona State	3–2
354	March 16, 2024	Tucson, AZ	Arizona State	4–0
355	March 17, 2024	Tucson, AZ	Arizona	14–3
356	May 7, 2024	Phoenix, AZ	#17 Arizona	5–3
357	March 11, 2025	Tucson, AZ	Arizona	3–2
358	April 4, 2025	Phoenix, AZ	Arizona	8–5
359	April 5, 2025	Phoenix, AZ	Arizona	5–3
360	April 6, 2025	Phoenix, AZ	#24 Arizona State	8–4
361	March 10, 2026	Phoenix, AZ	Arizona State	10–4
362	April 2, 2026	Tucson, AZ	#25 Arizona State	6–4
363	April 4, 2026	Tucson, AZ	Arizona	7–4
364	April 4, 2026	Tucson, AZ	#25 Arizona State	15–6
365	April 13, 2026	Phoenix, AZ	Arizona	5–3
Series: Arizona State leads 214–150–1

=== Achievements by season (1959–Present) ===
Season	Conference Regular season Champions	Conference Tournament Champions	Arizona's performance in in the NCAA tournament	Arizona State's performance in the NCAA tournament
Border Conference
1959	Incomplete Records	--	National Runner-Up	Did not qualify
1960	Incomplete Records	--	College World Series	Did not qualify
1961	Incomplete Records	--	District 6 Regional	Did not qualify
1962	Incomplete Records	--	District 6 Regional	Did not qualify
Western Athletic Conference - South Division
1963	Arizona	Arizona	National Runner-Up	Did not qualify
1964	Arizona State	Arizona State	Did not qualify	National Runner-Up
1965	Arizona State	Arizona State	Did not qualify	National champions
1966	Arizona	Arizona	College World Series	Did not qualify
1967	Arizona State	Arizona State	Did not qualify	National champions
1968	Arizona	BYU	Did not qualify	Did not qualify
1969	Arizona State	Arizona State	Did not qualify	National champions
1970	Arizona	Arizona	College World Series	Did not qualify
1971	Arizona State	BYU	Did not qualify	Did not qualify
1972	Arizona State	Arizona State	Did not qualify	National Runner-Up
1973	Arizona State	Arizona State	Did not qualify	National Runner-Up
1974	Arizona	Arizona	District 7 Regional	Did not qualify
1975	Arizona State	Arizona State	West Regional	College World Series
1976	Arizona State	Arizona State	National champions	College World Series
1977	Arizona State	Arizona State	Did not qualify	National champions
1978	Arizona State	Arizona State	West Regional	National Runner-Up
Pacific-10 Conference - South Division
1979	UCLA	--	College World Series	Did not qualify
1980	Arizona/California (co-champs)	--	National champions	Did not qualify
1981	Arizona State	--	Did not qualify	National champions
1982	Arizona State	--	Did not qualify	West II Regional
1983	Stanford	--	Did not qualify	College World Series
1984	Arizona State	--	Did not qualify	College World Series
1985	Stanford	--	College World Series	Did not qualify
1986	UCLA	--	National champions	Did not qualify
1987	Stanford	--	West II Regional	College World Series
1988	Arizona State	--	Did not qualify	National Runner-Up
1989	Arizona	--	West I Regional	Northeast Regional
1990	Stanford	--	Did not qualify	West II Regional
1991	USC	--	Did not qualify	Did not qualify
1992	Arizona	--	West Regional	Midwest Regional
1993	Arizona State	--	Midwest Regional	College World Series
1994	Stanford	--	Did not qualify	College World Series
1995	USC	--	Did not qualify	Did not qualify
1996	USC	--	Did not qualify	Did not qualify
1997	Stanford	--	Did not qualify	Atlantic Regional
1998	Stanford	--	Did not qualify	National Runner-Up
Pacific-10 Conference
1999	Stanford	--	Waco Regional	Did not qualify
2000	Arizona State/Stanford/UCLA (co-champs)	--	Did not qualify	Tempe Regional
2001	USC	--	Did not qualify	Fullerton Regional
2002	Oregon	--	Did not qualify	Mesa Regional
2003	Stanford	--	Fullerton Regional	Fullerton Super Regional
2004	Stanford	--	College World Series	Fullerton Regional
2005	Oregon State	--	Fullerton Regional	College World Series
2006	Oregon State	--	Did not qualify	Houston Regional
2007	Arizona State	--	Wichita Regional	College World Series
2008	Arizona State	--	Coral Gables Super Regional	Tempe Super Regional
2009	Arizona State	--	Did not qualify	College World Series
2010	Arizona State	--	Fort Worth Regional	College World Series
2011	UCLA	--	College Station Regional	Tempe Regional
Pac-12 Conference
2012	Arizona/UCLA (co-champs)	--	National champions	Did not qualify
2013	Oregon State	--	Did not qualify	Fullerton Regional
2014	Oregon State	--	Did not qualify	San Luis Obispo Regional
2015	UCLA	--	Did not qualify	Fullerton Regional
2016	Utah	--	National Runner-Up	Fort Worth Regional
2017	Oregon State	--	Lubbock Regional	Did not qualify
2018	Stanford	--	Did not qualify	Did not qualify
2019	UCLA	--	Did not qualify	Baton Rouge Regional
2020	No Champion	--	Tournament Cancelled due to COVID-19	
2021	Arizona	--	College World Series	Austin Regional
2022	Stanford	Stanford	Coral Gables Regional	Did not qualify
2023	Stanford	Oregon	Fayetteville Regional	Did not qualify
2024	Arizona	Arizona	Tucson Regional	Did not qualify
Big 12 Conference
2025	West Virginia	Arizona	College World Series	Los Angeles Regional
2026	Kansas	Kansas	Did not qualify	Lincoln Regional
