= UConn Huskies baseball, 1990–1999 =

American college baseball seasons

The Connecticut Huskies baseball teams represented the University of Connecticut in Storrs, Connecticut, United States in college baseball at the NCAA Division I level.

== 1990 ==
1990 Connecticut Huskies baseball

Big East tournament champions

NCAA Northeast Regional, 0–2
- Conference: Big East Conference
- Record: 27–19–1 (12–9 Big East)
- Head coach: Andy Baylock (11th season)
- Home stadium: J.O. Christian Field

1990 Big East Conference baseball standings
	Conf.						Overall
Team	W		L		T	PCT	W		L		T	PCT
Seton Hall ‍†‍‍	16	–	4	–	0	.800	35	–	18	–	0	.660
St. John's ‍‍‍	15	–	6	–	0	.714	29	–	18	–	0	.617
Villanova ‍‍‍	13	–	8	–	0	.619	33	–	16	–	0	.673
Connecticut ‍‍‡‍^{y}	12	–	9	–	0	.571	27	–	19	–	1	.585
Providence ‍‍‍	11	–	10	–	0	.524	27	–	21	–	0	.563
Boston College ‍‍‍	8	–	13	–	0	.381	20	–	22	–	1	.477
Georgetown ‍‍‍	4	–	16	–	0	.200	17	–	30	–	0	.362
Pittsburgh ‍‍‍	4	–	17	–	0	.190	8	–	23	–	0	.258
† – Conference champion ‡ – Tournament champion y – Invited to the NCAA tournament As of June 30, 1990; Rankings from Collegiate Baseball

=== Personnel ===
==== Roster ====
1990 Connecticut Huskies roster
Pitchers: - Pete Walker	Catchers: - Marek Drabinski; Infielders: - Paul Funk; - Craig MacDonald; Outfielders	- Patrick Butler; - Timothy Cain; - Michael Cleary; - Kenneth Coffee; - Timothy Dwyer; - Jason Fronio; - Anthony Gagliardi; - Francis Gately; - Craig Gaudio; - David Guild; - Chris Podeszwa; - Todd Rosenthal; - Edward Rossy; - Sal Tinnerelo

==== Coaches ====
1990 Connecticut Huskies baseball coaching staff
- - Andy Baylock – Head coach – 11th season

=== Schedule ===
Legend
	UConn win
	UConn loss
	Tie
*	Non-Conference game

1990 Connecticut Huskies baseball game log
Regular season

March
Date	Opponent	Site/stadium	Score	Overall record	Big East Record
Mar 11	at UNC Charlotte*	Tom and Lib Phillips Field • Charlotte, NC	L 1–2	0–1	
Mar 12	at UNC Charlotte*	Tom and Lib Phillips Field • Charlotte, NC	L 3–8	0–2	
Mar 13	vs Wingate*	Gene Hooks Stadium • Winston-Salem, NC	W 13–8	1–2	
Mar 13	at Wake Forest*	Gene Hooks Stadium • Winston-Salem, NC	W 11–2	2–2	
Mar 14	at Wake Forest*	Gene Hooks Stadium • Winston-Salem, NC	W 7–5	3–2	
Mar 15	at North Carolina*	Boshamer Stadium • Chapel Hill, NC	L 1–7	3–3	
Mar 16	at North Carolina*	Boshamer Stadium • Chapel Hill, NC	L 0–3	3–4	
Mar 21	Rhode Island*	J.O. Christian Field • Storrs, CT	W 7–0	4–4	
Mar 22	Siena*	J.O. Christian Field • Storrs, CT	T 5–5	4–4–1	
Mar 24	Boston College	J.O. Christian Field • Storrs, CT	W 7–0	5–4–1	1–0
Mar 24	Boston College	J.O. Christian Field • Storrs, CT	W 5–4	6–4–1	2–0
Mar 25	Boston College	J.O. Christian Field • Storrs, CT	W 7–1	7–4–1	3–0
Mar 27	at UMass*	Earl Lorden Field • Amherst, MA	W 16–0	8–4–1	
Mar 28	Hartford*	J.O. Christian Field • Storrs, CT	W 8–6	9–4–1	

April
Date	Opponent	Site/stadium	Score	Overall record	Big East Record
Apr 2	at Seton Hall	Owen T. Carroll Field • South Orange, NJ	L 0–	9–5–1	3–1
Apr 2	at Seton Hall	Owen T. Carroll Field • South Orange, NJ	L 4–11	9–6–1	3–2
Apr 4	at Yale*	Yale Field • New Haven, CT	W 4–1	10–6–1	
Apr 5	at Fairfield*	Alumni Baseball Diamond • Fairfield, CT	L 3–4	10–7–1	
Apr 8	Villanova	J.O. Christian Field • Storrs, CT	L 1–4	10–8–1	3–3
Apr 8	Villanova	J.O. Christian Field • Storrs, CT	L 1–5	10–9–1	3–4
Apr 9	Villanova	J.O. Christian Field • Storrs, CT	W 4–3	11–9–1	4–4
Apr 10	UMass*	J.O. Christian Field • Storrs, CT	W 8–7	12–9–1	
Apr 12	at St. John's	McCallen Field • Queens, NY	L 1–4	12–10–1	4–5
Apr 14	at St. John's	McCallen Field • Queens, NY	L 1–2	12–11–1	4–6
Apr 14	at St. John's	McCallen Field • Queens, NY	W 4–2	13–11–1	5–6
Apr 18	at Hartford*	Hartford, CT	L 3–6	13–12–1	
Apr 19	Central Connecticut*	J.O. Christian Field • Storrs, CT	W 15–4	14–12–1	
Apr 22	Georgetown	J.O. Christian Field • Storrs, CT	W 9–1	15–12–1	6–6
Apr 22	Georgetown	J.O. Christian Field • Storrs, CT	W 6–0	16–12–1	7–6
Apr 23	Georgetown	J.O. Christian Field • Storrs, CT	W 4–3	17–12–1	8–6
Apr 24	at Northeastern*	Parsons Field • Brookline, MA	L 2–5	17–13–1	
Apr 26	Fairfield*	J.O. Christian Field • Storrs, CT	W 17–9	18–13–1	
Apr 27	Maine*	J.O. Christian Field • Storrs, CT	L 3–17	18–14–1	
Apr 28	Providence	J.O. Christian Field • Storrs, CT	W 1–0	19–14–1	9–6
Apr 28	Providence	J.O. Christian Field • Storrs, CT	L 2–6	19–15–1	9–7
Apr 29	Providence	J.O. Christian Field • Storrs, CT	L 7–8	19–16–1	9–8

May
Date	Opponent	Site/stadium	Score	Overall record	Big East Record
May 1	at Central Connecticut*	Balf–Savin Field • New Britain, CT	W 3–2	20–16–1	
May 3	at Brown*	Aldrich Field • Providence, RI	W 10–8	21–16–1	
May 5	at Pittsburgh	Trees Field • Pittsburgh, PA	W 8–3	22–16–1	10–8
May 6	at Pittsburgh	Trees Field • Pittsburgh, PA	W 16–4	23–16–1	11–8
May 6	at Pittsburgh	Trees Field • Pittsburgh, PA	W 15–3	24–16–1	12–8
May 12	at Seton Hall	Owen T. Carroll Field • South Orange, NJ	L 1–2	24–17–1	12–9

Post-season

Big East Tournament
Date	Opponent	Seed	Site/stadium	Score	Overall record	BET Record
May 15	(1) Seton Hall	(4)	Muzzy Field • Bristol, CT	W 11–3	25–17–1	1–0
May 18	(3) Villanova	(4)	Muzzy Field • Bristol, CT	W 1–0	26–17–1	2–0
May 19	(1) Seton Hall	(4)	Muzzy Field • Bristol, CT	W 4–3	27–17–1	3–0

NCAA Northeast Regional
Date	Opponent	Site/stadium	Score	Overall record	NCAAT record	
May 24	(2) Georgia	(5)	Municipal Stadium • Waterbury, CT	L 2–7	27–18–1	0–1
May 25	(6) Rutgers	(5)	Municipal Stadium • Waterbury, CT	L 5–15	27–19–1	0–2

== 1991 ==
1991 Connecticut Huskies baseball
- Conference: Big East Conference
- Record: 16–25–1 (8–12 Big East)
- Head coach: Andy Baylock (12th season)
- Home stadium: J.O. Christian Field

1991 Big East Conference baseball standings
	Conf.						Overall
Team	W		L		T	PCT	W		L		T	PCT
No. 30 St. John's ‍†‍‍^{y}	18	–	2	–	0	.900	34	–	14	–	1	.704
Villanova ‍‍‡‍^{y}	12	–	8	–	0	.600	37	–	15	–	1	.708
Providence ‍‍‍	12	–	8	–	0	.600	35	–	16	–	1	.683
Boston College ‍‍‍	12	–	9	–	0	.571	23	–	19	–	0	.548
Seton Hall ‍‍‍	10	–	9	–	0	.526	26	–	19	–	1	.576
Connecticut ‍‍‍	8	–	12	–	0	.400	16	–	25	–	1	.393
Pittsburgh ‍‍‍	4	–	15	–	0	.211	15	–	30	–	0	.333
Georgetown ‍‍‍	4	–	17	–	0	.190	10	–	32	–	0	.238
† – Conference champion ‡ – Tournament champion y – Invited to the NCAA tournament As of June 30, 1991; Rankings from Collegiate Baseball

=== Personnel ===
==== Roster ====
1991 Connecticut Huskies roster
Pitchers: - Aaron Quinn	Catchers: - Gianni Ragaini; - Jim Penders; Infielders: - Paul Funk; - Craig MacDonald; - Todd Rosenthal; - Jim Tonelli; Outfielders: - Dennis Dwyer	- Timothy Arciola; - Patrick Butler; - David Fradkin; - Anthony Gagliardi; - Kevin Gormley; - David Guild; - Jason Himich; - Sean Irey; - Christopher Marra; - Walter Nakonechny; - Kevin Petchark; - Chris Podeszwa; - Sal Tinnerelo

==== Coaches ====
1991 Connecticut Huskies baseball coaching staff
- - Andy Baylock – Head coach – 12th season

=== Schedule ===
Legend
	UConn win
	UConn loss
	Tie
*	Non-Conference game

1991 Connecticut Huskies baseball game log
Regular season

February/March
Date	Opponent	Site/stadium	Score	Overall record	Big East Record
Mar 10	vs Ithaca*	Baseball City Stadium • Haines City, FL	W 4–3	1–0	
Mar 10	at Saint Leo*	Thomas B. Southard Stadium • Saint Leo, FL	W 8–2	2–0	
Mar 11	at Florida Southern*	Joker Marchant Stadium • Lakeland, FL	L 1–7	2–1	
Mar 12	vs Chicago State*	Turley Athletic Complex • St. Petersburg, FL	W 11–4	3–1	
Mar 12	at Eckerd*	Turley Athletic Complex • St. Petersburg, FL	L 1–13	3–2	
Mar 13	vs Fordham*	Henley Field • Lakeland, FL	L 8–10	3–3	
Mar 14	vs Liberty*	Polk Community College • Winter Haven, FL	L 6–7	3–4	
Mar 14	at Florida Southern*	Joker Marchant Stadium • Lakeland, FL	L 5–6	3–5	
Mar 16	vs Michigan State*	Polk Community College • Winter Haven, FL	L 2–3	3–6	
Mar 20	Rhode Island*	J.O. Christian Field • Storrs, CT	L 2–5	3–7	
Mar 21	Holy Cross*	J.O. Christian Field • Storrs, CT	W 7–4	4–7	
Mar 24	at Villanova	Richie Ashburn Field • Villanova, PA	W 10–8	5–7	1–0
Mar 25	at Villanova	Richie Ashburn Field • Villanova, PA	L 3–4	5–8	1–1
Mar 25	at Villanova	Richie Ashburn Field • Villanova, PA	W 11–4	6–8	2–1
Mar 28	at UMass*	Earl Lorden Field • Amherst, MA	T 6–	6–8–1	
Mar 29	Pittsburgh	J.O. Christian Field • Storrs, CT	L 5–7	6–9–1	2–2
Mar 30	Pittsburgh	J.O. Christian Field • Storrs, CT	W 6–2	7–9–1	3–2
Mar 31	Pittsburgh	J.O. Christian Field • Storrs, CT	W 14–6	8–9–1	4–2

April
Date	Opponent	Site/stadium	Score	Overall record	Big East Record
Apr 3	Yale*	J.O. Christian Field • Storrs, CT	L 5–6	8–10–1	
Apr 4	Fairfield*	J.O. Christian Field • Storrs, CT	W 9–2	9–10–1	
Apr 6	Seton Hall	J.O. Christian Field • Storrs, CT	L 3–4	9–11–1	4–3
Apr 6	Seton Hall	J.O. Christian Field • Storrs, CT	L 10–16	9–12–1	4–4
Apr 7	Seton Hall	J.O. Christian Field • Storrs, CT	L 5–6	9–13–1	4–5
Apr 9	UMass*	J.O. Christian Field • Storrs, CT	L 4–11	9–14–1	
Apr 10	at Rhode Island*	Bill Beck Field • Kingston, RI	W15–14	10–14–1	
Apr 11	at Hartford*	West Hartford, CT	L 7–10	10–15–1	
Apr 13	at Georgetown	GU Baseball Diamond • Washington, D.C.	W 9–0	11–15–1	5–5
Apr 14	at Georgetown	GU Baseball Diamond • Washington, D.C.	L 1–3	11–16–1	5–6
Apr 14	at Georgetown	GU Baseball Diamond • Washington, D.C.	W 9–4	12–16–1	6–6
Apr 16	Hartford*	J.O. Christian Field • Storrs, CT	L 6–13	12–17–1	
Apr 17	at Holy Cross*	Fitton Field • Worcester, MA	W 7–6	13–17–1	
Apr 20	St. John's	J.O. Christian Field • Storrs, CT	L 1–9	13–18–1	6–7
Apr 20	St. John's	J.O. Christian Field • Storrs, CT	L 0–11	13–19–1	6–8
Apr 23	Northeastern*	J.O. Christian Field • Storrs, CT	L 6–10	13–20–1	
Apr 25	at Fairfield*	Alumni Baseball Diamond • Fairfield, CT	W 7–2	14–20–1	
Apr 27	at Boston College	Eddie Pellagrini Diamond at John Shea Field • Chestnut Hill, MA	L 1–15	14–21–1	6–9
Apr 27	at Boston College	Eddie Pellagrini Diamond at John Shea Field • Chestnut Hill, MA	W 8–2	15–21–1	7–9
Apr 28	at Boston College	Eddie Pellagrini Diamond at John Shea Field • Chestnut Hill, MA	L 0–9	15–22–1	7–10

May
Date	Opponent	Site/stadium	Score	Overall record	Big East Record
May 2	Brown*	J.O. Christian Field • Storrs, CT	L 6–10	15–23–1	
May 3	at Providence	Hendricken Field • Providence, RI	L 7–15	15–24–1	7–11
May 5	at Providence	Hendricken Field • Providence, RI	L 7–11	15–25–1	7–12
May 5	at Providence	Hendricken Field • Providence, RI	W 6–5	16–25–1	8–12

== 1992 ==
1992 Connecticut Huskies baseball

Big East tournament, 3rd
- Conference: Big East Conference
- Record: 25–20–1 (13–7 Big East)
- Head coach: Andy Baylock (13th season)
- Home stadium: J.O. Christian Field

1992 Big East Conference baseball standings
	Conf.						Overall
Team	W		L		T	PCT	W		L		T	PCT
St. John's ‍†‍‍	14	–	5	–	0	.737	30	–	13	–	0	.698
Seton Hall ‍‍‍	14	–	7	–	0	.667	28	–	27	–	0	.509
Connecticut ‍‍‍	13	–	7	–	0	.650	25	–	20	–	1	.554
Providence ‍‍‡‍^{y}	12	–	8	–	0	.600	29	–	23	–	0	.558
Villanova ‍‍‍	9	–	10	–	0	.474	22	–	21	–	0	.512
Georgetown ‍‍‍	6	–	15	–	0	.286	12	–	30	–	1	.291
Pittsburgh ‍‍‍	5	–	13	–	0	.278	23	–	21	–	0	.523
Boston College ‍‍‍	5	–	13	–	0	.278	18	–	17	–	1	.514
† – Conference champion ‡ – Tournament champion y – Invited to the NCAA tournament As of June 30, 1992; Rankings from Collegiate Baseball

=== Personnel ===
==== Roster ====
1992 Connecticut Huskies roster
Pitchers: - John Fisher; - John Kelly; - Aaron Quinn	Catchers: - Jim Penders; - Gianni Ragaini; Infielders: - Paul Funk; - Craig MacDonald; - Todd Rosenthal; - Jim Tonelli; Outfielders	- Michael Blais; - Dale Dymkoski; - David Guild; - Christopher Hayes; - Sean Irey; - Brian Majeski; - Christopher Marra; - Kevin Petchark; - Chris Podeszwa; - Kevin Strollo; - Sal Tinnerelo

==== Coaches ====
1992 Connecticut Huskies baseball coaching staff
- - Andy Baylock – Head coach – 13th season

=== Schedule ===
Legend
	UConn win
	UConn loss
	Tie
*	Non-Conference game

1992 Connecticut Huskies baseball game log
Regular season

February/March
Date	Opponent	Site/stadium	Score	Overall record	Big East Record
Mar 7	vs Penn State*	Henley Field • Lakeland, FL	W 6–5	1–0	
Mar 8	at Saint Leo*	Thomas B. Southard Stadium • Saint Leo, FL	W 16–7	2–0	
Mar 9	vs Oklahoma State*	Thomas B. Southard Stadium • Saint Leo, FL	L 3–5	2–1	
Mar 10	vs Ithaca*	Tinker Field • Orlando, FL	W 8–6	3–1	
Mar 11	at South Florida*	Red McEwen Field • Tampa, FL	L 8–12	3–2	
Mar 12	vs Oklahoma State*	Thomas B. Southard Stadium • Saint Leo, FL	L 5–10	3–3	
Mar 13	at Fordham*	Henley Field • Lakeland, FL	W 7–1	4–3	
Mar 14	vs Northeastern Illinois*	Thomas B. Southard Stadium • Saint Leo, FL	W 12–4	5–3	
Mar 14	at Florida Southern*	Henley Field • Lakeland, FL	L 5–11	5–4	
Mar 18	Rhode Island*	J.O. Christian Field • Storrs, CT	W 16–4	6–4	
Mar 29	Villanova	J.O. Christian Field • Storrs, CT	L 1–11	6–5	0–1
Mar 29	Villanova	J.O. Christian Field • Storrs, CT	W 20–2	7–5	1–1
Mar 30	Villanova	J.O. Christian Field • Storrs, CT	L 4–8	7–6	1–2

April
Date	Opponent	Site/stadium	Score	Overall record	Big East Record
Apr 1	at Yale*	Yale Field • New Haven, CT	L 6–7	7–7	
Apr 2	at Fairfield*	Alumni Baseball Diamond • Fairfield, CT	L 1–4	7–8	
Apr 4	at Seton Hall	Owen T. Carroll Field • South Orange, NJ	L 1–2	7–9	1–3
Apr 4	at Seton Hall	Owen T. Carroll Field • South Orange, NJ	L 2–3	7–10	1–4
Apr 5	at Seton Hall	Owen T. Carroll Field • South Orange, NJ	W 5–4	8–10	2–4
Apr 7	at UMass*	Earl Lorden Field • Amherst, MA	L 1–4	8–11	
Apr 8	at Rhode Island*	Bill Beck Field • Kingston, RI	W 5–0	9–11	
Apr 9	Hartford*	J.O. Christian Field • Storrs, CT	L 4–5	9–12	
Apr 11	Georgetown	J.O. Christian Field • Storrs, CT	W 21–2	10–12	3–4
Apr 11	Georgetown	J.O. Christian Field • Storrs, CT	W 6–0	11–12	4–4
Apr 12	Georgetown	J.O. Christian Field • Storrs, CT	W 6–2	12–12	5–4
Apr 13	Providence	J.O. Christian Field • Storrs, CT	W 10–7	13–12	6–4
Apr 14	Hartford*	J.O. Christian Field • Storrs, CT	L 4–14	13–13	
Apr 15	at Northeastern*	Parsons Field • Brookline, MA	W 9–4	14–13	
Apr 18	at Pittsburgh	Trees Field • Pittsburgh, PA	W 8–5	15–13	7–4
Apr 18	at Pittsburgh	Trees Field • Pittsburgh, PA	W 10–3	16–13	8–4
Apr 19	at Pittsburgh	Trees Field • Pittsburgh, PA	W 12–4	17–13	9–4
Apr 22	at Holy Cross*	Fitton Field • Worcester, MA	T 1–1	17–13–1	
Apr 23	Fairfield*	J.O. Christian Field • Storrs, CT	W 6–4	18–13–1	
Apr 25	at St. John's	McCallen Field • Queens, NY	L 2–3	18–14–1	9–5
Apr 25	at St. John's	McCallen Field • Queens, NY	L 8–9	18–15–1	9–6
Apr 26	at St. John's	McCallen Field • Queens, NY	W 9–7	19–15–1	10–6
Apr 28	Central Connecticut*	J.O. Christian Field • Storrs, CT	W 11–3	20–15–1	
Apr 30	at Central Connecticut*	Balf–Savin Field • New Britain, CT	L 4–5	20–16–1	

May
Date	Opponent	Site/stadium	Score	Overall record	Big East Record
May 2	Boston College	J.O. Christian Field • Storrs, CT	L 1–4	20–17–1	10–7
May 2	Boston College	J.O. Christian Field • Storrs, CT	W 11–0	21–17–1	11–7
May 3	Boston College	J.O. Christian Field • Storrs, CT	W 13–6	22–17–1	12–7
May 10	Providence	J.O. Christian Field • Storrs, CT	W 4–3	23–17–1	13–7

Post-season

Big East Tournament
Date	Opponent	Seed	Site/stadium	Score	Overall record	BET Record
May 12	(2) Seton Hall	(3)	Muzzy Field • Bristol, CT	W 14–2	24–17–1	1–0
May 13	(4) Providence	(3)	Muzzy Field • Bristol, CT	L 2–13	24–18–1	1–1
May 14	(2) Seton Hall	(3)	Muzzy Field • Bristol, CT	W 4–3	25–18–1	2–1
May 14	(4) Providence	(3)	Muzzy Field • Bristol, CT	W 11–8	26–18–1	3–1
May 15	(4) Providence	(3)	Muzzy Field • Bristol, CT	L 3–5	26–19–1	3–2

== 1993 ==
1993 Connecticut Huskies baseball

NCAA Midwest Regional, 0–2
- Conference: Big East Conference
- Record: 27–19–1 (12–9 Big East)
- Head coach: Andy Baylock (14th season)
- Home stadium: J.O. Christian Field

1993 Big East Conference baseball standings
	Conf.						Overall
Team	W		L		T	PCT	W		L		T	PCT
Villanova ‍†‍‍	14	–	7	–	0	.667	27	–	15	–	1	.640
Seton Hall ‍‍‍	12	–	8	–	0	.600	30	–	18	–	0	.625
Connecticut ‍‍‍^{y}	12	–	9	–	0	.571	27	–	19	–	0	.587
No. 14 St. John's ‍‍‡‍^{y}	11	–	10	–	0	.524	28	–	20	–	0	.583
Boston College ‍‍‍	11	–	10	–	0	.524	22	–	14	–	0	.611
Pittsburgh ‍‍‍	10	–	11	–	0	.476	30	–	13	–	0	.698
Providence ‍‍‍	8	–	12	–	0	.400	21	–	24	–	0	.467
Georgetown ‍‍‍	5	–	16	–	0	.238	7	–	22	–	0	.241
† – Conference champion ‡ – Tournament champion y – Invited to the NCAA tournament As of June 30, 1993; Rankings from Collegiate Baseball

=== Personnel ===
==== Roster ====
1993 Connecticut Huskies roster
Pitchers: - John Fisher; - John Kelly; - Joel Nadeau; - Aaron Quinn	Catchers: - Jim Penders; - Gianni Ragaini; - Dennis Regan; Infielders: - Paul Funk; - Jim Tonelli; Outfielders: - Dennis Dwyer	- Chris Besson; - Michael Blais; - Kyle Cooney; - Kevin Gormley; - Michael Guilbeault; - Christopher Hayes; - Sean Irey; - Tod Levesh; - Brian Majeski; - Chris Podeszwa; - Jeff Scott; - Kevin Strollo; - Rueben Wilson

==== Coaches ====
1993 Connecticut Huskies baseball coaching staff
- - Andy Baylock – Head coach – 14th season

=== Schedule ===
Legend
	UConn win
	UConn loss
*	Non-Conference game

1993 Connecticut Huskies baseball game log
Regular season

March
Date	Opponent	Site/stadium	Score	Overall record	Big East Record
Mar 13	vs Regis*	Joker Marchant Stadium • Lakeland, FL	L 17–18	0–1	
Mar 14	vs Florida Southern*	Joker Marchant Stadium • Lakeland, FL	W 8–4	1–1	
Mar 15	vs Fordham*	Joker Marchant Stadium • Lakeland, FL	W 8–5	2–1	
Mar 17	vs Tennessee Wesleyan*	Joker Marchant Stadium • Lakeland, FL	W 22–1	3–1	
Mar 18	vs Fordham*	Joker Marchant Stadium • Lakeland, FL	W 7–6	4–1	
Mar 19	vs Ohio State*	Joker Marchant Stadium • Lakeland, FL	L 3–7	4–2	
Mar 20	vs South Alabama*	Joker Marchant Stadium • Lakeland, FL	L 5–11	4–3	
Mar 27	at Boston College	Eddie Pellagrini Diamond at John Shea Field • Chestnut Hill, MA	W 9–4	5–3	1–0
Mar 27	at Boston College	Eddie Pellagrini Diamond at John Shea Field • Chestnut Hill, MA	W 3–1	6–3	2–0
Mar 28	at Boston College	Eddie Pellagrini Diamond at John Shea Field • Chestnut Hill, MA	L 1–3	6–4	2–1
Mar 31	at Yale*	Yale Field • New Haven, CT	L 1–5	6–5	

April
Date	Opponent	Site/stadium	Score	Overall record	Big East Record
Apr 3	at Seton Hall	Owen T. Carroll Field • South Orange, NJ	W 4–3	7–5	3–1
Apr 4	at Seton Hall	Owen T. Carroll Field • South Orange, NJ	W 6–3	8–5	4–1
Apr 4	at Seton Hall	Owen T. Carroll Field • South Orange, NJ	L 4–11	8–6	4–2
Apr 6	at Rhode Island*	Bill Beck Field • Kingston, RI	W 7–1	9–6	
Apr 7	at UMass*	Earl Lorden Field • Amherst, MA	W 12–2	10–6	
Apr 9	Pittsburgh	J.O. Christian Field • Storrs, CT	W 2–1	11–6	5–2
Apr 9	Pittsburgh	J.O. Christian Field • Storrs, CT	L 2–16	11–7	5–3
Apr 13	Hartford*	J.O. Christian Field • Storrs, CT	L 6–8	11–8	
Apr 14	Northeastern*	J.O. Christian Field • Storrs, CT	W 8–4	12–8	
Apr 15	at Fairfield*	Alumni Baseball Diamond • Fairfield, CT	W 3–2	13–8	
Apr 17	at Georgetown	GU Baseball Diamond • Washington, D.C.	L 2–3	13–9	5–4
Apr 17	at Georgetown	GU Baseball Diamond • Washington, D.C.	W 13–2	14–9	6–4
Apr 18	at Georgetown	GU Baseball Diamond • Washington, D.C.	W 14–4	15–9	7–4
Apr 20	Holy Cross*	J.O. Christian Field • Storrs, CT	W 11–3	16–9	
Apr 21	UMass*	J.O. Christian Field • Storrs, CT	W 7–6	17–9	
Apr 24	St. John's	J.O. Christian Field • Storrs, CT	W 7–4	18–9	8–4
Apr 24	St. John's	J.O. Christian Field • Storrs, CT	L 1–2	18–10	8–5
Apr 25	St. John's	J.O. Christian Field • Storrs, CT	W 6–2	19–10	9–5
Apr 27	at Central Connecticut*	Balf–Savin Field • New Britain, CT	L 2–10	19–11	
Apr 29	Fairfield*	J.O. Christian Field • Storrs, CT	W 5–2	20–11	

May
Date	Opponent	Site/stadium	Score	Overall record	Big East Record
May 1	at Villanova	Richie Ashburn Field • Villanova, PA	L 6–8	20–12	9–6
May 1	at Villanova	Richie Ashburn Field • Villanova, PA	L 5–6	20–13	9–7
May 2	at Villanova	Richie Ashburn Field • Villanova, PA	W 13–9	21–13	10–7
May 4	Central Connecticut*	J.O. Christian Field • Storrs, CT	W 7–6	22–13	
May 5	Rhode Island*	J.O. Christian Field • Storrs, CT	W 7–3	23–13	
May 8	at Providence	Hendricken Field • Providence, RI	L 3–4	23–14	10–8
May 8	at Providence	Hendricken Field • Providence, RI	L 1–4	23–15	10–9
May 9	at Providence	Hendricken Field • Providence, RI	W 7–6	24–15	11–9
May 15	Pittsburgh	J.O. Christian Field • Storrs, CT	W 5–3	25–15	12–9

Post-season

Big East Tournament
Date	Opponent	Seed	Site/stadium	Score	Overall record	BET Record
May 18	(2) Seton Hall	(3)	Muzzy Field • Bristol, CT	L 5–6	25–16	0–1
May 19	(1) Villanova	(3)	Muzzy Field • Bristol, CT	W 10–5	26–16	1–1
May 20	(2) Seton Hall	(3)	Muzzy Field • Bristol, CT	W 10–9	27–16	2–1
May 20	(4) St. John's	(3)	Muzzy Field • Bristol, CT	L 0–9	27–17	2–2

NCAA Midwest Regional
Date	Opponent	Seed	Site/stadium	Score	Overall record	NCAAT record
May 28	(2) Oklahoma State	(5)	Allie P. Reynolds Stadium • Stillwater, OK	L 5–9	27–18	0–1
May 29	(6) Fordham	(5)	Allie P. Reynolds Stadium • Stillwater, OK	L 0–5	27–19	0–2

== 1994 ==
1994 Connecticut Huskies baseball

Big East tournament champions

NCAA Midwest II Regional, 0–2
- Conference: Big East Conference
- Record: 30–18 (12–9 Big East)
- Head coach: Andy Baylock (15th season)
- Home stadium: J.O. Christian Field

1994 Big East Conference baseball standings
	Conf.						Overall
Team	W		L		T	PCT	W		L		T	PCT
Pittsburgh ‍†‍‍	16	–	5	–	0	.762	31	–	16	–	1	.656
Providence ‍‍‍	13	–	8	–	0	.619	32	–	21	–	0	.604
Seton Hall ‍‍‍	12	–	8	–	0	.600	32	–	21	–	1	.602
Connecticut ‍‍‡‍^{y}	12	–	9	–	0	.571	30	–	18	–	0	.625
St. John's ‍‍‍	10	–	8	–	0	.556	20	–	16	–	0	.556
Georgetown ‍‍‍	6	–	12	–	1	.342	17	–	31	–	1	.357
Boston College ‍‍‍	5	–	14	–	0	.263	14	–	23	–	2	.385
Villanova ‍‍‍	4	–	14	–	0	.222	16	–	23	–	0	.410
† – Conference champion ‡ – Tournament champion y – Invited to the NCAA tournament As of June 30, 1994; Rankings from Collegiate Baseball

=== Personnel ===
==== Roster ====
1994 Connecticut Huskies roster
Pitchers: - John Fisher; - Mike Galati; - John Kelly; - Aaron Quinn	Catchers: - Jim Penders; - Dennis Regan; Infielders: - Keith Wetjen; Outfielders: - Dennis Dwyer; - Matt Zawalich	- Chris Besson; - Kyle Cooney; - Kevin Gormley; - Michael Guilbeault; - Sean Irey; - Jonathan Krot; - Tod Levesh; - Brian Majeski; - Jason Meyer; - Erik Nord; - Matt O'Connell; - Jeff Scott; - Kevin Strollo; - Jeff Sutherland; - James Tonelli; - Jeff Uccello; - Rueben Wilson

==== Coaches ====
1994 Connecticut Huskies baseball coaching staff
- - Andy Baylock – Head coach – 15th season

=== Schedule ===
Legend
	UConn win
	UConn loss
*	Non-Conference game

1994 Connecticut Huskies baseball game log
Regular season

March
Date	Opponent	Site/stadium	Score	Overall record	Big East Record
Mar 11	at North Carolina*	Boshamer Stadium • Chapel Hill, NC	L 5–7	0–1	
Mar 12	at North Carolina*	Boshamer Stadium • Chapel Hill, NC	L 3–12	0–2	
Mar 13	at North Carolina*	Boshamer Stadium • Chapel Hill, NC	L 1–2	0–3	
Mar 20	at Delaware*	Delaware Diamond • Newark, DE	W 6–5	1–3	
Mar 22	at Navy*	Terwilliger Brothers Field at Max Bishop Stadium • Annapolis, MD	W 8–7	2–3	
Mar 23	at George Mason*	Spuhler Field • Fairfax, VA	W 7–1	3–3	
Mar 26	at Providence	Hendricken Field • Providence, RI	W 6–4	4–3	1–0
Mar 26	at Providence	Hendricken Field • Providence, RI	L 4–6	4–4	1–1
Mar 28	at Providence	Hendricken Field • Providence, RI	W 16–5	5–4	2–1
Mar 31	at Fairfield*	Alumni Baseball Diamond • Fairfield, CT	W 14–0	6–4	

April
Date	Opponent	Site/stadium	Score	Overall record	Big East Record
Apr 1	at Pittsburgh	Trees Field • Pittsburgh, PA	L 7–12	6–5	2–2
Apr 2	at Pittsburgh	Trees Field • Pittsburgh, PA	L 6–16	6–6	2–3
Apr 2	at Pittsburgh	Trees Field • Pittsburgh, PA	L 5–11	6–7	2–4
Apr 5	UMass*	J.O. Christian Field • Storrs, CT	W 14–5	7–7	
Apr 6	at Rhode Island*	Bill Beck Field • Kingston, RI	W 16–0	8–7	
Apr 9	at St. John's	McCallen Field • Queens, NY	L 1–2	8–8	2–5
Apr 9	at St. John's	McCallen Field • Queens, NY	W 10–2	9–8	3–5
Apr 10	at St. John's	McCallen Field • Queens, NY	L 4–6	9–9	3–6
Apr 12	at Hartford*	Hartford, CT	W 10–2	10–9	
Apr 14	at UMass*	Earl Lorden Field • Amherst, MA	L 3–11	10–10	
Apr 17	Boston College	J.O. Christian Field • Storrs, CT	W 7–6	11–10	4–6
Apr 17	Boston College	J.O. Christian Field • Storrs, CT	W 21–4	12–10	5–6
Apr 18	Boston College	J.O. Christian Field • Storrs, CT	W 7–3	13–10	6–6
Apr 19	Yale*	J.O. Christian Field • Storrs, CT	W 12–2	14–10	
Apr 20	at Holy Cross*	Fitton Field • Worcester, MA	W 6–1	15–10	
Apr 21	at Maine*	Mahaney Diamond • Orono, ME	L 9–11	15–11	
Apr 23	Georgetown	J.O. Christian Field • Storrs, CT	W 16–7	16–11	7–6
Apr 23	Georgetown	J.O. Christian Field • Storrs, CT	W 24–1	17–11	8–6
Apr 24	Georgetown	J.O. Christian Field • Storrs, CT	L 11–12	17–12	8–7
Apr 26	Central Connecticut*	J.O. Christian Field • Storrs, CT	W 29–10	18–12	
Apr 28	Fairfield*	J.O. Christian Field • Storrs, CT	W 7–6	19–12	
Apr 30	at Seton Hall	Owen T. Carroll Field • South Orange, NJ	L 8–15	19–13	8–8
Apr 30	at Seton Hall	Owen T. Carroll Field • South Orange, NJ	L 0–16	19–14	8–9

May
Date	Opponent	Site/stadium	Score	Overall record	Big East Record
May 1	at Seton Hall	Owen T. Carroll Field • South Orange, NJ	W 5–2	20–14	9–9
May 3	Hartford*	J.O. Christian Field • Storrs, CT	W 15–4	21–14	
May 4	Brown*	J.O. Christian Field • Storrs, CT	W 7–2	22–14	
May 5	Rhode Island*	J.O. Christian Field • Storrs, CT	W 7–6	23–14	
May 7	Villanova	J.O. Christian Field • Storrs, CT	W 6–2	24–14	10–9
May 7	Villanova	J.O. Christian Field • Storrs, CT	W 9–5	25–14	11–9
May 8	Villanova	J.O. Christian Field • Storrs, CT	W 9–2	26–14	12–9
May 10	at Central Connecticut*	Balf–Savin Field • New Britain, CT	L 6–7	26–15	
May 11	Northeastern*	J.O. Christian Field • Storrs, CT	W 10–4	27–15	

Post-season

Big East Tournament
Date	Opponent	Seed	Site/stadium	Score	Overall record	BET Record
May 18	(1) Pittsburgh	(4)	Muzzy Field • Bristol, CT	W 4–3	28–15	1–0
May 19	(3) Seton Hall	(4)	Muzzy Field • Bristol, CT	W 3–0	29–15	2–0
May 20	(3) Seton Hall	(4)	Muzzy Field • Bristol, CT	L 1–6	29–16	2–1
May 21	(3) Seton Hall	(4)	Muzzy Field • Bristol, CT	W 4–2	30–16	3–1

NCAA Midwest II Regional
Date	Opponent	Seed	Site/stadium	Score	Overall record	NCAAT record
May 27	(1) Georgia Tech	(6)	Eck Stadium • Wichita, KS	L 0–7	30–17	0–1
May 28	(2) Long Beach State	(6)	Eck Stadium • Wichita, KS	L 9–16	30–18	0–2

== 1995 ==
1995 Connecticut Huskies baseball
- Conference: Big East Conference
- Record: 13–30–1 (4–17 Big East)
- Head coach: Andy Baylock (16th season)
- Home stadium: J.O. Christian Field

1995 Big East Conference baseball standings
	Conf.						Overall
Team	W		L		T	PCT	W		L		T	PCT
Providence ‍†‍‍	16	–	5	–	0	.762	44	–	15	–	0	.746
Seton Hall ‍‍‍	14	–	7	–	0	.667	38	–	16	–	0	.704
Villanova ‍‍‍	14	–	7	–	0	.667	40	–	16	–	0	.714
Pittsburgh ‍‍‡‍^{y}	12	–	9	–	0	.571	39	–	16	–	0	.709
St. John's ‍‍‍	12	–	9	–	0	.571	18	–	16	–	0	.529
Boston College ‍‍‍	8	–	13	–	0	.381	21	–	24	–	0	.467
Georgetown ‍‍‍	4	–	17	–	0	.190	17	–	34	–	0	.333
Connecticut ‍‍‍	4	–	17	–	0	.190	13	–	30	–	1	.307
† – Conference champion ‡ – Tournament champion y – Invited to the NCAA tournament As of June 30, 1995; Rankings from Collegiate Baseball

=== Personnel ===
==== Roster ====
1995 Connecticut Huskies roster
Pitchers: - Chris Barton; - John Fisher; - Mike Galati; - Joel Nadeau; - Jeff Velez	Catchers: - Jason Grabowski; Infielders: - Keith Wetjen; Outfielders: - Matt Zawalich	- Chris Besson; - Dan Catlin; - Jason Edgar; - Michael Guilbeault; - Chet Kasper; - Jason Meyer; - Erik Nord; - Jeff Scott; - Tom Thulin; - Jeff Uccello; - Rueben Wilson

==== Coaches ====
1995 Connecticut Huskies baseball coaching staff
- - Andy Baylock – Head coach – 16th season

=== Schedule ===
Legend
	UConn win
	UConn loss
	Tie
*	Non-Conference game

1995 Connecticut Huskies baseball game log
Regular season

March
Date	Opponent	Site/stadium	Score	Overall record	Big East Record
Mar 10	at Wake Forest*	Gene Hooks Stadium • Winston-Salem, NC	L 5–17	0–1	
Mar 11	at Wake Forest*	Gene Hooks Stadium • Winston-Salem, NC	W 15–7	1–1	
Mar 12	at Wake Forest*	Gene Hooks Stadium • Winston-Salem, NC	L 5–12	1–2	
Mar 18	at Delaware*	Delaware Diamond • Newark, DE	L 0–3	1–3	
Mar 19	at Delaware*	Delaware Diamond • Newark, DE	L 0–2	1–4	
Mar 20	at George Mason*	Spuhler Field • Fairfax, VA	W 9–8	2–4	
Mar 21	at George Mason*	Spuhler Field • Fairfax, VA	L 3–12	2–5	
Mar 22	at Navy*	Terwilliger Brothers Field at Max Bishop Stadium • Annapolis, MD	W 10–5	3–5	
Mar 25	at Georgetown	GU Baseball Diamond • Washington, D.C.	L 9–10	3–6	0–1
Mar 25	at Georgetown	GU Baseball Diamond • Washington, D.C.	L 3–4	3–7	0–2
Mar 26	at Georgetown	GU Baseball Diamond • Washington, D.C.	L 4–8	3–8	0–3
Mar 29	at Yale*	Yale Field • New Haven, CT	L 3–6	3–9	
Mar 30	at Fairfield*	Alumni Baseball Diamond • Fairfield, CT	T 9–9	3–9–1	

April
Date	Opponent	Site/stadium	Score	Overall record	Big East Record
Apr 1	at Boston College	Eddie Pellagrini Diamond at John Shea Field • Chestnut Hill, MA	L 9–11	3–10–1	0–4
Apr 1	at Boston College	Eddie Pellagrini Diamond at John Shea Field • Chestnut Hill, MA	L 5–10	3–11–1	0–5
Apr 2	at Boston College	Eddie Pellagrini Diamond at John Shea Field • Chestnut Hill, MA	L 6–7	3–12–1	0–6
Apr 4	UMass*	J.O. Christian Field • Storrs, CT	L 2–6	3–13–1	
Apr 6	New Hampshire	J.O. Christian Field • Storrs, CT	L 14–15	3–14–1	
Apr 9	St. John's	J.O. Christian Field • Storrs, CT	W 6–1	4–14–1	1–6
Apr 9	St. John's	J.O. Christian Field • Storrs, CT	L 1–6	4–15–1	1–7
Apr 10	St. John's	J.O. Christian Field • Storrs, CT	W 5–2	5–15–1	2–7
Apr 11	at Hartford*	West Hartford, CT	L 2–6	5–16–1	
Apr 12	at Maine*	Mahaney Diamond • Orono, ME	L 3–5	5–17–1	
Apr 14	Pittsburgh	J.O. Christian Field • Storrs, CT	L 3–8	5–18–1	2–8
Apr 15	Pittsburgh	J.O. Christian Field • Storrs, CT	L 5–8	5–19–1	2–9
Apr 15	Pittsburgh	J.O. Christian Field • Storrs, CT	L 4–5	5–20–1	2–10
Apr 18	Rhode Island*	J.O. Christian Field • Storrs, CT	W 7–2	6–20–1	
Apr 20	Holy Cross*	J.O. Christian Field • Storrs, CT	W 9–8	7–20–1	
Apr 22	Seton Hall	J.O. Christian Field • Storrs, CT	L 4–5	7–21–1	2–11
Apr 22	Seton Hall	J.O. Christian Field • Storrs, CT	W 3–2	8–21–1	3–11
Apr 23	Seton Hall	J.O. Christian Field • Storrs, CT	L 7–8	8–22–1	3–12
Apr 25	Central Connecticut*	J.O. Christian Field • Storrs, CT	L 0–4	8–23–1	
Apr 27	Fairfield*	J.O. Christian Field • Storrs, CT	W 14–4	9–23–1	
Apr 29	at Providence	Hendricken Field • Providence, RI	L 2–8	9–24–1	3–13
Apr 29	at Providence	Hendricken Field • Providence, RI	L 2–11	9–25–1	3–14

May
Date	Opponent	Site/stadium	Score	Overall record	Big East Record
May 1	at Providence	Hendricken Field • Providence, RI	W 10–9	10–25–1	4–14
May 2	Hartford*	J.O. Christian Field • Storrs, CT	W 13–4	11–25–1	
May 3	at Brown*	Aldrich Field • Providence, RI	L 5–11	11–26–1	
May 4	at Rhode Island*	Bill Beck Field • Kingston, RI	W 20–5	12–26–1	
May 6	at Villanova	Richie Ashburn Field • Villanova, PA	L 4–16	12–27–1	4–15
May 7	at Villanova	Richie Ashburn Field • Villanova, PA	L 2–3	12–28–1	4–16
May 7	at Villanova	Richie Ashburn Field • Villanova, PA	L 5–9	12–29–1	4–17
May 9	at Central Connecticut*	Balf–Savin Field • New Britain, CT	L 3–5	12–30–1	
May 10	Northeastern*	J.O. Christian Field • Storrs, CT	W 4–2	13–30–1	

== 1996 ==
1996 Connecticut Huskies baseball
- Conference: Big East Conference
- Record: 24–23 (13–12 Big East)
- Head coach: Andy Baylock (17th season)
- Home stadium: J.O. Christian Field

1996 Big East Conference baseball standings
	Conf.						Overall
Team	W		L		T	PCT	W		L		T	PCT
American Division
West Virginia ^{x}‍‍‡‍^{y}	15	–	10	–	0	.600	33	–	25	–	0	.569
Providence ^{x}‍‍‍	15	–	10	–	0	.600	32	–	17	–	1	.650
St. John's ‍‍‍	14	–	10	–	0	.583	26	–	18	–	0	.591
Connecticut ‍‍‍	13	–	12	–	0	.520	24	–	23	–	0	.511
Pittsburgh ‍‍‍	9	–	13	–	0	.409	24	–	20	–	2	.543
Boston College ‍‍‍	6	–	18	–	0	.250	15	–	27	–	0	.357
National Division
Villanova ^{x}‍‍‍	16	–	5	–	0	.762	25	–	20	–	0	.556
Rutgers ‍‍‍	15	–	7	–	1	.674	32	–	21	–	1	.602
Notre Dame ‍‍‍^{y}	13	–	7	–	0	.650	44	–	18	–	0	.710
Georgetown ‍‍‍	6	–	18	–	0	.250	18	–	34	–	0	.346
Seton Hall ‍‍‍	5	–	17	–	1	.239	18	–	27	–	1	.402
x – Division champion ‡ – Tournament champion y – Invited to the NCAA tournament As of June 30, 1996; Rankings from Collegiate Baseball

=== Personnel ===
==== Roster ====
1996 Connecticut Huskies roster
Pitchers: - Chris Barton; - Joel Nadeau; - Josh Santos; - Jeff Velez	Catchers: - Jason Grabowski; Infielders: - Alejandro Rodriguez; Outfielders: - Billy Rich; - Matt Zawalich	- Chris Besson; - Alan Bundy; - Jason Edgar; - Ted Gregorski; - Chet Kasper; - Willy Mercado; - Mark Monkiewicz; - John Morris; - Matt O'Connell; - Dennis Regan; - Jeff Scott; - Peter Smith; - Jeff Uccello; - David White; - Rueben Wilson

==== Coaches ====
1996 Connecticut Huskies baseball coaching staff
- - Andy Baylock – Head coach – 17th season

=== Schedule ===
Legend
	UConn win
	UConn loss
*	Non-Conference game

1996 Connecticut Huskies baseball game log
Regular season

March
Date	Opponent	Site/stadium	Score	Overall record	Big East Record
Mar 1	at Minnesota*	Hubert H. Humphrey Metrodome • Minneapolis, MN	W 8–6	1–0	
Mar 2	vs NC State*	Hubert H. Humphrey Metrodome • Minneapolis, MN	L 4–8	1–1	
Mar 3	vs Tennessee*	Hubert H. Humphrey Metrodome • Minneapolis, MN	L 0–6	1–2	
Mar 9	at Georgia Tech*	Russ Chandler Stadium • Atlanta, GA	L 0–7	1–3	
Mar 9	at Georgia Tech*	Russ Chandler Stadium • Atlanta, GA	L 2–8	1–4	
Mar 10	at Georgia Tech*	Russ Chandler Stadium • Atlanta, GA	L 8–11	1–5	
Mar 16	at Delaware*	Delaware Diamond • Newark, DE	L 7–10	1–6	
Mar 16	at Delaware*	Delaware Diamond • Newark, DE	L 7–17	1–7	
Mar 18	at George Mason*	Spuhler Field • Fairfax, VA	L 8–12	1–8	
Mar 20	at Navy*	Terwilliger Brothers Field at Max Bishop Stadium • Annapolis, MD	W 6–2	2–8	
Mar 23	Rutgers	J.O. Christian Field • Storrs, CT	L 0–3	2–9	0–1
Mar 23	Rutgers	J.O. Christian Field • Storrs, CT	W 3–2	3–9	1–1
Mar 24	Seton Hall	J.O. Christian Field • Storrs, CT	W 4–3	4–9	2–1
Mar 24	Seton Hall	J.O. Christian Field • Storrs, CT	W 6–5	5–9	3–1
Mar 27	Yale*	J.O. Christian Field • Storrs, CT	W 7–2	6–9	
Mar 28	Rhode Island*	J.O. Christian Field • Storrs, CT	W 13–0	7–9	
Mar 30	at Providence	Hendricken Field • Providence, RI	L 3–10	7–10	3–2
Mar 30	at Providence	Hendricken Field • Providence, RI	L 3–7	7–11	3–3
Mar 31	at Providence	Hendricken Field • Providence, RI	W 13–7	8–11	4–3

April
Date	Opponent	Site/stadium	Score	Overall record	Big East Record
Apr 2	at UMass*	Earl Lorden Field • Amherst, MA	L 2–10	8–12	
Apr 3	at Fairfield*	Alumni Baseball Diamond • Fairfield, CT	W 19–3	9–12	
Apr 4	New Hampshire*	J.O. Christian Field • Storrs, CT	W 7–4	10–12	
Apr 6	at Notre Dame	Frank Eck Stadium • Notre Dame, IN	L 6–7	10–13	4–4
Apr 6	at Notre Dame	Frank Eck Stadium • Notre Dame, IN	W 10–9	11–13	5–4
Apr 9	Hartford*	J.O. Christian Field • Storrs, CT	W 11–5	12–13	
Apr 13	Pittsburgh	J.O. Christian Field • Storrs, CT	L 3–6	12–14	5–5
Apr 13	Pittsburgh	J.O. Christian Field • Storrs, CT	L 3–10	12–15	5–6
Apr 14	Pittsburgh	J.O. Christian Field • Storrs, CT	W 16–2	13–15	6–6
Apr 17	at St. John's	McCallen Field • Queens, NY	W 5–4	14–15	7–6
Apr 17	at St. John's	McCallen Field • Queens, NY	L 0–4	14–16	7–7
Apr 18	at Holy Cross*	Fitton Field • Worcester, MA	W 9–8	15–16	
Apr 20	Boston College	J.O. Christian Field • Storrs, CT	W 13–11	16–16	8–7
Apr 20	Boston College	J.O. Christian Field • Storrs, CT	W 28–7	17–16	9–7
Apr 21	Boston College	J.O. Christian Field • Storrs, CT	L 8–14	17–17	9–8
Apr 23	at Rhode Island*	Bill Beck Field • Kingston, RI	L 5–6	17–18	
Apr 24	St. John's	J.O. Christian Field • Storrs, CT	W 4–3	18–18	10–8
Apr 25	Fairfield*	J.O. Christian Field • Storrs, CT	W 24–3	19–18	
Apr 27	at Georgetown	GU Baseball Diamond • Washington, D.C.	W 16–8	20–18	11–8
Apr 27	at Georgetown	GU Baseball Diamond • Washington, D.C.	W 10–6	21–18	12–8
Apr 28	at Villanova	Richie Ashburn Field • Villanova, PA	L 0–4	21–19	12–9
Apr 28	at Villanova	Richie Ashburn Field • Villanova, PA	L 5–19	21–20	12–10

May
Date	Opponent	Site/stadium	Score	Overall record	Big East Record
May 1	Brown*	J.O. Christian Field • Storrs, CT	W 7–1	22–20	
May 4	at West Virginia	Hawley Field • Morgantown, WV	W 7–5	23–20	13–10
May 5	at West Virginia	Hawley Field • Morgantown, WV	L 3–9	23–21	13–11
May 5	at West Virginia	Hawley Field • Morgantown, WV	L 11–12	23–22	13–12
May 7	Central Connecticut*	J.O. Christian Field • Storrs, CT	W 10–2	24–22	
May 8	at Northeastern*	Parsons Field • Brookline, MA	L 7–8	24–23	

== 1997 ==
1997 Connecticut Huskies baseball
- Conference: Big East Conference
- Record: 27–20 (11–13 Big East)
- Head coach: Andy Baylock (18th season)
- Assistant coach: Jim Penders (1st season)
- Home stadium: J.O. Christian Field

1997 Big East Conference baseball standings
	Conf.						Overall
Team	W		L		T	PCT	W		L		T	PCT
American Division
West Virginia ^{x}‍‍‍	17	–	7	–	0	.708	36	–	19	–	0	.655
St. John's ‍‍‡‍^{y}	16	–	7	–	0	.696	35	–	17	–	0	.673
Connecticut ‍‍‍	11	–	13	–	0	.458	27	–	20	–	0	.574
Providence ‍‍‍	10	–	15	–	0	.400	26	–	23	–	1	.530
Boston College ‍‍‍	8	–	17	–	0	.320	20	–	23	–	0	.465
Pittsburgh ‍‍‍	8	–	17	–	0	.320	19	–	26	–	0	.422
National Division
Notre Dame ^{x}‍‍‍	15	–	6	–	0	.714	41	–	19	–	0	.683
Rutgers ‍‍‍	13	–	11	–	0	.542	28	–	24	–	0	.538
Seton Hall ‍‍‍	13	–	11	–	0	.542	32	–	22	–	0	.593
Villanova ‍‍‍	12	–	12	–	0	.500	29	–	27	–	0	.518
Georgetown ‍‍‍	8	–	15	–	0	.348	19	–	37	–	1	.342
x – Division champion † – Conference champion ‡ – Tournament champion y – Invited to the NCAA tournament As of June 30, 1997; Rankings from Collegiate Baseball

=== Personnel ===
==== Roster ====
1997 Connecticut Huskies roster
Pitchers: - Chris Barton; - Scott Berney; - Mike Galati; - Josh Santos	Catchers: - Clarke Caudill; - Jason Grabowski; Infielders: - Alejandro Rodriguez; Outfielders: - Billy Rich	- Rick Belmonte; - Zach Bergan; - Alan Bundy; - Jason Edgar; - Ted Gregorski; - Jason Irey; - Chet Kasper; - Scott Mastropietro; - Willy Mercado; - Mark Monkiewicz; - Peter O'Neil; - Brian Packin; - Rich Rubel; - Peter Smith; - Ian Wilson

==== Coaches ====
1997 Connecticut Huskies baseball coaching staff
- - Andy Baylock – Head coach – 18th season
- 16 - Jim Penders - Assistant coach - 1st season

=== Schedule ===
Legend
	UConn win
	UConn loss
*	Non-Conference game

1997 Connecticut Huskies baseball game log
Regular season

March
Date	Opponent	Site/stadium	Score	Overall record	Big East Record
Mar 1	vs Seton Hall*	Boshamer Stadium • Chapel Hill, NC	L 5–9	0–1	
Mar 2	at North Carolina*	Boshamer Stadium • Chapel Hill, NC	L 3–10	0–2	
Mar 3	at North Carolina*	Boshamer Stadium • Chapel Hill, NC	W 7–6	1–2	
Mar 8	at Charlotte*	Tom and Lib Phillips Field • Charlotte, NC	W 11–4	2–2	
Mar 8	at Charlotte*	Tom and Lib Phillips Field • Charlotte, NC	W 6–3	3–2	
Mar 9	at Charlotte*	Tom and Lib Phillips Field • Charlotte, NC	W 8–0	4–2	
Mar 16	at Delaware*	Delaware Diamond • Newark, DE	L 1–13	4–3	
Mar 16	at Delaware*	Delaware Diamond • Newark, DE	W 10–9	5–3	
Mar 17	at George Mason*	Spuhler Field • Fairfax, VA	L 0–7	5–4	
Mar 18	at George Mason*	Spuhler Field • Fairfax, VA	W 5–0	6–4	
Mar 19	at UMBC*	Alumni Field • Catonsville, MD	W 10–8	7–4	
Mar 20	at Navy*	Terwilliger Brothers Field at Max Bishop Stadium • Annapolis, MD	L 4–6	7–5	
Mar 22	at Pittsburgh	Trees Field • Pittsburgh, PA	L 4–5	7–6	0–1
Mar 22	at Pittsburgh	Trees Field • Pittsburgh, PA	W 18–10	8–6	1–1
Mar 23	at Pittsburgh	Trees Field • Pittsburgh, PA	W 14–8	9–6	2–1
Mar 25	at Rhode Island*	Bill Beck Field • Kingston, RI	W 32–14	10–6	
Mar 26	at Yale*	Yale Field • New Haven, CT	W 19–13	11–6	
Mar 29	Notre Dame	J.O. Christian Field • Storrs, CT	L 2–7	11–7	2–2

April
Date	Opponent	Site/stadium	Score	Overall record	Big East Record
Apr 2	at Fairfield*	Alumni Baseball Diamond • Fairfield, CT	W 9–6	12–7	
Apr 5	at Villanova	Richie Ashburn Field • Villanova, PA	L 11–20	12–8	2–3
Apr 5	at Villanova	Richie Ashburn Field • Villanova, PA	W 11–10	13–8	3–3
Apr 6	at Georgetown	GU Baseball Diamond • Washington, D.C.	W 11–0	14–8	4–3
Apr 6	at Georgetown	GU Baseball Diamond • Washington, D.C.	L 5–8	14–9	4–4
Apr 8	Northeastern*	J.O. Christian Field • Storrs, CT	W 11–3	15–9	
Apr 9	St. John's	J.O. Christian Field • Storrs, CT	W 8–5	16–9	5–4
Apr 10	at New Hampshire*	Brackett Field • Durham, NH	L 16–19	16–10	
Apr 12	West Virginia	J.O. Christian Field • Storrs, CT	W 8–5	17–10	6–4
Apr 13	West Virginia	J.O. Christian Field • Storrs, CT	W 11–3	18–10	7–4
Apr 14	West Virginia	J.O. Christian Field • Storrs, CT	L 2–9	18–11	7–5
Apr 16	at St. John's	McCallen Field • Queens, NY	L 2–3	18–12	7–6
Apr 17	Holy Cross*	J.O. Christian Field • Storrs, CT	W 8–6	19–12	
Apr 19	Providence	J.O. Christian Field • Storrs, CT	W 8–0	20–12	8–6
Apr 20	Providence	J.O. Christian Field • Storrs, CT	L 0–4	20–13	8–7
Apr 20	Providence	J.O. Christian Field • Storrs, CT	L 5–6	20–14	8–8
Apr 22	Rhode Island*	J.O. Christian Field • Storrs, CT	W 9–8	21–14	
Apr 23	St. John's	J.O. Christian Field • Storrs, CT	L 7–10	21–15	8–9
Apr 24	Fairfield*	J.O. Christian Field • Storrs, CT	W 3–2	22–15	
Apr 26	at Seton Hall	Owen T. Carroll Field • South Orange, NJ	L 4–8	22–16	8–10
Apr 26	at Seton Hall	Owen T. Carroll Field • South Orange, NJ	L 2–7	22–17	8–11
Apr 27	at Rutgers	Class of 1953 Complex - Gruninger Baseball Complex • Piscataway, NJ	L 7–10	22–18	8–12
Apr 27	at Rutgers	Class of 1953 Complex - Gruninger Baseball Complex • Piscataway, NJ	W 9–5	23–18	9–12
Apr 29	at Hartford*	Ray McKenna Field • East Hartford, CT	L 12–13	23–19	

May
Date	Opponent	Site/stadium	Score	Overall record	Big East Record
May 1	Hartford*	J.O. Christian Field • Storrs, CT	W 19–4	24–19	
May 4	at Boston College	Eddie Pellagrini Diamond at John Shea Field • Chestnut Hill, MA	W 22–6	25–19	10–12
May 4	at Boston College	Eddie Pellagrini Diamond at John Shea Field • Chestnut Hill, MA	L 2–12	25–20	10–13
May 5	at Boston College	Eddie Pellagrini Diamond at John Shea Field • Chestnut Hill, MA	W 10–3	26–20	11–13
May 8	UMass*	J.O. Christian Field • Storrs, CT	W 8–6	27–20	

== 1998 ==
1998 Connecticut Huskies baseball
- Conference: Big East Conference
- Record: 24–23 (13–12 Big East)
- Head coach: Andy Baylock (19th season)
- Assistant coach: Jim Penders (2nd season)
- Home stadium: J.O. Christian Field

1998 Big East Conference baseball standings
	Conf.						Overall
Team	W		L		T	PCT	W		L		T	PCT
No. 30 Rutgers ‍†‍‡‍^{y}	17	–	3	–	0	.850	33	–	16	–	0	.673
Notre Dame ‍‍‍	15	–	4	–	0	.789	41	–	17	–	0	.707
St. John's ‍‍‍	14	–	7	–	0	.667	28	–	17	–	1	.620
Providence ‍‍‍	14	–	8	–	1	.630	31	–	22	–	1	.583
West Virginia ‍‍‍	13	–	9	–	0	.591	37	–	17	–	1	.682
Seton Hall ‍‍‍	12	–	10	–	0	.545	25	–	23	–	0	.521
Connecticut ‍‍‍	12	–	11	–	0	.522	25	–	17	–	0	.595
Villanova ‍‍‍	6	–	15	–	0	.286	26	–	21	–	1	.552
Pittsburgh ‍‍‍	5	–	16	–	0	.238	12	–	27	–	1	.313
Boston College ‍‍‍	4	–	15	–	1	.225	17	–	23	–	1	.427
Georgetown ‍‍‍	5	–	19	–	0	.208	22	–	34	–	0	.393
† – Conference champion ‡ – Tournament champion y – Invited to the NCAA tournament As of June 30, 1998; Rankings from Collegiate Baseball

=== Personnel ===
==== Roster ====
1998 Connecticut Huskies roster
Pitchers: - Chris Barton; - Scott Berney; - Chris DeBrisco; - Mike Galati; - Josh Santos	Catchers: - Clarke Caudill; - Brian Esposito; Infielders: - Alejandro Rodriguez; Outfielders: - Billy Rich; - Greg Stillman	- Alan Bundy; - Jason Edgar; - Ryan Fanning; - Ted Gregorski; - T. J. Hannon; - Joe Kagerer; - Glenn Katz; - Willy Mercado; - Mark Monkiewicz; - Brian Packin; - Peter Smith; - Tom Thulin; - Ryan Treat

==== Coaches ====
1998 Connecticut Huskies baseball coaching staff
- - Andy Baylock – Head coach – 19th season
- 16 - Jim Penders - Assistant coach - 2nd season

=== Schedule ===
Legend
	UConn win
	UConn loss
*	Non-Conference game

1998 Connecticut Huskies baseball game log
Regular season

March
Date	Opponent	Site/stadium	Score	Overall record	Big East Record
Mar 6	vs California*	Hubert H. Humphrey Metrodome • Minneapolis, MN	L 8–22	0–1	
Mar 7	vs Rutgers*	Hubert H. Humphrey Metrodome • Minneapolis, MN	L 9–15	0–2	
Mar 8	at Minnesota*	Hubert H. Humphrey Metrodome • Minneapolis, MN	L 1–11	0–3	
Mar 14	vs Indiana*	Homestead Sports Complex • Homestead, FL (Homestead Challenge)	W 18–10	1–3	
Mar 15	vs Marist*	Homestead Sports Complex • Homestead, FL (Homestead Challenge)	W 6–3	2–3	
Mar 16	vs Liberty*	Homestead Sports Complex • Homestead, FL (Homestead Challenge)	W 6–5	3–3	
Mar 17	vs NYIT*	Homestead Sports Complex • Homestead, FL (Homestead Challenge)	W 8–4	4–3	
Mar 18	vs Northern Iowa*	Homestead Sports Complex • Homestead, FL (Homestead Challenge)	L 1–6	4–4	
Mar 23	Providence	J.O. Christian Field • Storrs, CT	W 6–1	5–4	1–0
Mar 25	Yale*	J.O. Christian Field • Storrs, CT	W 9–1	6–4	
Mar 26	at Rhode Island*	Bill Beck Field • Kingston, RI	L 12–14	6–5	
Mar 28	Seton Hall	J.O. Christian Field • Storrs, CT	L 7–11	6–6	1–1
Mar 28	Seton Hall	J.O. Christian Field • Storrs, CT	L 5–21	6–7	1–2
Mar 29	Seton Hall	J.O. Christian Field • Storrs, CT	L 1–9	6–8	1–3
Mar 31	UMass*	J.O. Christian Field • Storrs, CT	W 11–3	7–8	

April
Date	Opponent	Site/stadium	Score	Overall record	Big East Record
Apr 2	Fairfield*	J.O. Christian Field • Storrs, CT	W 14–6	8–8	
Apr 4	at Georgetown	GU Baseball Diamond • Washington, D.C.	W 7–6	9–8	2–3
Apr 5	at Georgetown	GU Baseball Diamond • Washington, D.C.	L 4–7	9–9	2–4
Apr 5	at Georgetown	GU Baseball Diamond • Washington, D.C.	W 9–5	10–9	3–4
Apr 7	at UMass*	Earl Lorden Field • Amherst, MA	L 6–12	10–10	
Apr 10	at West Virginia	Hawley Field • Morgantown, WV	W 8–5	11–10	4–4
Apr 10	at West Virginia	Hawley Field • Morgantown, WV	W 12–8	12–10	5–4
Apr 11	at Pittsburgh	Trees Field • Pittsburgh, PA	W 3–2	13–10	6–4
Apr 11	at Pittsburgh	Trees Field • Pittsburgh, PA	L 10–12	13–11	6–5
Apr 13	Central Connecticut*	J.O. Christian Field • Storrs, CT	W 12–7	14–11	
Apr 15	St. John's	J.O. Christian Field • Storrs, CT	L 4–8	14–12	6–6
Apr 16	at Holy Cross*	Fitton Field • Worcester, MA	W 8–3	15–12	
Apr 18	Rutgers	J.O. Christian Field • Storrs, CT	L 6–9	15–13	6–7
Apr 18	Rutgers	J.O. Christian Field • Storrs, CT	L 8–13	15–14	6–8
Apr 19	Rutgers	J.O. Christian Field • Storrs, CT	W 7–3	16–14	7–8
Apr 21	Rhode Island*	J.O. Christian Field • Storrs, CT	W 13–5	17–14	
Apr 22	at St. John's	McCallen Field • Queens, NY	L 0–7	17–15	7–9
Apr 25	Villanova	J.O. Christian Field • Storrs, CT	W 4–2	18–15	8–9
Apr 25	Villanova	J.O. Christian Field • Storrs, CT	L 8–10	18–16	8–10
Apr 26	Villanova	J.O. Christian Field • Storrs, CT	W 24–5	19–16	9–10
Apr 28	at Brown*	Murray Stadium • Providence, RI	W 26–6	20–16	
Apr 29	at St. John's	McCallen Field • Queens, NY	W 5–4	21–16	10–10
Apr 30	at Hartford*	Beehive Field • New Britain, CT	W 24–5	22–16	

May
Date	Opponent	Site/stadium	Score	Overall record	Big East Record
May 2	at Boston College	Eddie Pellagrini Diamond at John Shea Field • Chestnut Hill, MA	L 5–8	22–17	10–11
May 3	at Boston College	Eddie Pellagrini Diamond at John Shea Field • Chestnut Hill, MA	W 12–6	23–17	11–11
May 3	at Boston College	Eddie Pellagrini Diamond at John Shea Field • Chestnut Hill, MA	W 7–3	24–17	12–11
May 5	Hartford	J.O. Christian Field • Storrs, CT	W 11–10	25–17	

== 1999 ==
1999 Connecticut Huskies baseball
- Conference: Big East Conference
- Record: 24–23 (13–12 Big East)
- Head coach: Andy Baylock (20th season)
- Assistant coach: Jim Penders (3rd season)
- Home stadium: J.O. Christian Field

1999 Big East Conference baseball standings
	Conf.						Overall
Team	W		L		T	PCT	W		L		T	PCT
Notre Dame ‍†‍‍^{y}	20	–	5	–	0	.800	43	–	18	–	0	.705
Rutgers ‍‍‍^{y}	19	–	7	–	0	.731	37	–	21	–	0	.638
Providence ‍‍‡‍^{y}	18	–	8	–	0	.692	49	–	16	–	0	.754
Seton Hall ‍‍‍	14	–	11	–	0	.560	32	–	19	–	1	.625
St. John's ‍‍‍	13	–	11	–	1	.540	32	–	22	–	2	.589
West Virginia ‍‍‍	12	–	13	–	0	.480	29	–	28	–	0	.509
Villanova ‍‍‍	11	–	15	–	0	.423	27	–	26	–	1	.509
Pittsburgh ‍‍‍	11	–	15	–	0	.423	27	–	27	–	0	.500
Boston College ‍‍‍	10	–	15	–	1	.404	26	–	21	–	1	.552
Connecticut ‍‍‍	10	–	16	–	0	.385	27	–	24	–	0	.529
Georgetown ‍‍‍	2	–	24	–	0	.077	18	–	34	–	0	.346
† – Conference champion ‡ – Tournament champion y – Invited to the NCAA tournament As of June 30, 1999; Rankings from Collegiate Baseball

=== Personnel ===
==== Roster ====
1999 Connecticut Huskies roster
Pitchers: - Robert Barton; - Scott Berney; - Chris DeBrisco; - Jeff Fulchino; - Patrick Sperone	Catchers: - Clarke Caudill; - Brian Esposito; Infielders Outfielders: - Cy Hess; - Greg Stillman	- Alan Bundy; - Ryan Fanning; - Jonathan Gorrie; - Ted Gregorski; - Joe Kagerer; - Glenn Katz; - Jason Landeen; - Willy Mercado; - Mark Monkiewicz; - Brian Packin; - Jon Robinson; - Grant Rogers; - Andrew Schmata; - Peter Smith; - Brian Tisbert; - Ryan Treat

==== Coaches ====
1999 Connecticut Huskies baseball coaching staff
- - Andy Baylock – Head coach – 20th season
- 16 - Jim Penders - Assistant coach - 3rd season

=== Schedule ===
Legend
	UConn win
	UConn loss
*	Non-Conference game

1999 Connecticut Huskies baseball game log
Regular season

February/March
Date	Opponent	Site/stadium	Score	Overall record	Big East Record
Feb 26	vs Navy*	USA Stadium • Millington, TN	W 4–1	1–0	
Feb 26	vs West Virginia*	USA Stadium • Millington, TN	L 2–3	1–1	
Feb 27	vs Memphis*	USA Stadium • Millington, TN	W 10–3	2–1	
Feb 28	vs Air Force*	USA Stadium • Millington, TN	L 6–7	2–2	
Mar 6	at The Citadel*	Joseph P. Riley Jr. Park • Charleston, SC	W 2–1	3–2	
Mar 6	at The Citadel*	Joseph P. Riley Jr. Park • Charleston, SC	L 2–3^{12}	3–3	
Mar 7	at The Citadel*	Joseph P. Riley Jr. Park • Charleston, SC	L 4–9	3–4	
Mar 13	vs Michigan*	Homestead Sports Complex • Homestead, FL (Homestead Challenge)	L 3–6	3–5	
Mar 14	vs St. Francis (NY)*	Homestead Sports Complex • Homestead, FL (Homestead Challenge)	W 11–1	4–5	
Mar 15	vs Rider*	Homestead Sports Complex • Homestead, FL (Homestead Challenge)	W 13–11	5–5	
Mar 17	vs Rhode Island*	Homestead Sports Complex • Homestead, FL (Homestead Challenge)	L 2–17	5–6	
Mar 18	vs Dartmouth*	Homestead Sports Complex • Homestead, FL (Homestead Challenge)	W 5–3	6–6	
Mar 19	vs Vermont*	Homestead Sports Complex • Homestead, FL (Homestead Challenge)	W 5–4	7–6	
Mar 20	vs Ohio State*	Homestead Sports Complex • Homestead, FL (Homestead Challenge)	W 9–6^{11}	8–6	
Mar 24	at Yale*	Yale Field • New Haven, CT	W 7–5	9–6	
Mar 25	at Rhode Island*	Bill Beck Field • Kingston, RI	W 7–5	10–6	
Mar 27	Pittsburgh	J.O. Christian Field • Storrs, CT	L 0–1	10–7	0–1
Mar 27	Pittsburgh	J.O. Christian Field • Storrs, CT	L 5–7^{11}	10–8	0–2
Mar 28	West Virginia	J.O. Christian Field • Storrs, CT	W 2–1	11–8	1–2
Mar 28	West Virginia	J.O. Christian Field • Storrs, CT	L 7–8	11–9	1–3
Mar 30	UMass*	J.O. Christian Field • Storrs, CT	W 20–14	12–9	
Mar 31	at Central Connecticut*	Balf–Savin Field • New Britain, CT	W 23–5	13–9	

April
Date	Opponent	Site/stadium	Score	Overall record	Big East Record
Apr 1	Northeastern*	J.O. Christian Field • Storrs, CT	W 12–8	14–9	
Apr 3	at Notre Dame	Frank Eck Stadium • Notre Dame, IN	L 7–11	14–10	1–4
Apr 3	at Notre Dame	Frank Eck Stadium • Notre Dame, IN	L 8–11	14–11	1–5
Apr 5	at Providence	Hendricken Field • Providence, RI	L 2–14	14–12	1–6
Apr 5	at Providence	Hendricken Field • Providence, RI	L 18–25	14–13	1–7
Apr 7	St. John's	J.O. Christian Field • Storrs, CT	W 3–2	15–13	2–7
Apr 8	at UMass*	Earl Lorden Field • Amherst, MA	W 8–0	16–13	
Apr 10	at Rutgers	Class of 1953 Complex - Gruninger Baseball Complex • Piscataway, NJ	L 2–11	16–14	2–8
Apr 10	at Rutgers	Class of 1953 Complex - Gruninger Baseball Complex • Piscataway, NJ	W 19–11	17–14	3–8
Apr 11	at Rutgers	Class of 1953 Complex - Gruninger Baseball Complex • Piscataway, NJ	L 6–9	17–15	3–9
Apr 14	at St. John's	Jack Kaiser Stadium • Queens, NY	W 22–11	18–15	4–9
Apr 15	Holy Cross*	J.O. Christian Field • Storrs, CT	W 20–0	19–15	
Apr 17	Georgetown	J.O. Christian Field • Storrs, CT	W 7–6	20–15	5–9
Apr 17	Georgetown	J.O. Christian Field • Storrs, CT	W 6–3	21–15	6–9
Apr 18	Georgetown	J.O. Christian Field • Storrs, CT	W 7–5	22–15	7–9
Apr 21	St. John's	J.O. Christian Field • Storrs, CT	L 4–10	22–16	7–10
Apr 22	Rhode Island*	J.O. Christian Field • Storrs, CT	W 10–5	23–16	
Apr 24	at Villanova	Richie Ashburn Field • Villanova, PA	L 1–2	23–17	7–11
Apr 24	at Villanova	Richie Ashburn Field • Villanova, PA	W 9–8	24–17	8–11
Apr 25	at Villanova	Richie Ashburn Field • Villanova, PA	L 6–15	24–18	8–12
Apr 27	Fairfield*	J.O. Christian Field • Storrs, CT	L 4–5	24–19	
Apr 29	at Hartford*	Memorial Field • Simsbury, CT	L 3–6	24–20	

May
Date	Opponent	Site/stadium	Score	Overall record	Big East Record
May 1	Boston College	J.O. Christian Field • Storrs, CT	W 7–6	25–20	9–12
May 1	Boston College	J.O. Christian Field • Storrs, CT	L 8–11	25–21	9–13
May 2	Boston College	J.O. Christian Field • Storrs, CT	L 11–25	25–22	9–14
May 4	Hartford*	J.O. Christian Field • Storrs, CT	W 11–1	26–22	
May 15	at Seton Hall	Owen T. Carroll Field • South Orange, NJ	W 8–2	27–22	10–14
May 15	at Seton Hall	Owen T. Carroll Field • South Orange, NJ	L 2–9	27–23	10–15
May 16	at Seton Hall	Owen T. Carroll Field • South Orange, NJ	L 2–12	27–24	10–16
