= List of UConn Huskies baseball seasons =

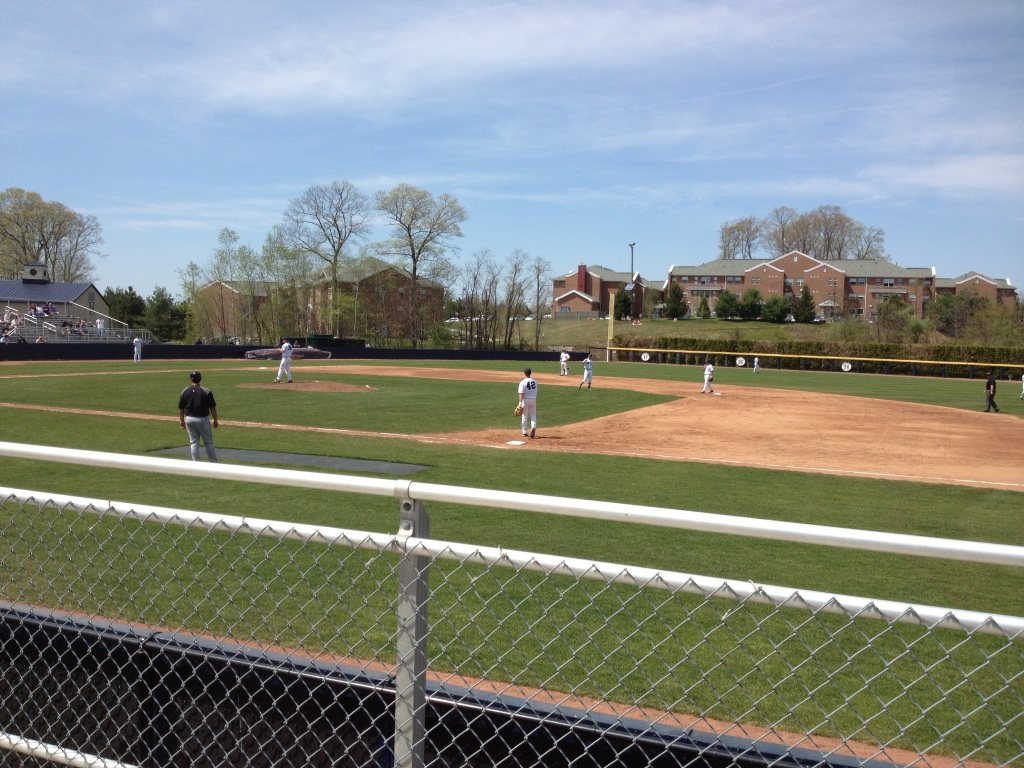
J. O. Christian Field

This is a list of UConn Huskies baseball seasons. The UConn Huskies baseball team represents the University of Connecticut and is a member of the Big East Conference of the NCAA Division I.

The Huskies have made five College World Series appearances and 22 appearances in the NCAA Division I Baseball Championship. Conference records for the six seasons that the Huskies competed in the Eastern Collegiate Athletic Conference are not currently available.

== Season results ==
National champions	College World Series berth	NCAA tournament berth	Conference Tournament champions	Conference/Division Regular season Champions

Season	Head coach	Conference	Season results									Tournament Results		Final Poll (Note: Collegiate Baseball began team rankings in 1959 and ceased operations in 2024. D1Baseball polls are used from 2019.)
Season	Head coach	Conference	Overall				Conference					Conference	Postseason (Note: Postseason play involving the NCAA Division I Baseball Championship began in 1947.)	CB/D1B
Season	Head coach	Conference	Wins	Losses	Ties	%	Wins	Losses	Ties	%	Finish (Members)	Conference	Postseason	CB/D1B
UConn Huskies
1896	No Coach	Independent	3	4	0	.429	No Conference						—	—
1897	No Coach	Independent	2	3	0	.400	No Conference						—	—
1898	No Coach	Independent	1	2	0	.333	No Conference						—	—
1899	T. D. Knowles	Independent	3	3	1	.500	No Conference						—	—
1900	T. D. Knowles	Independent	5	4	0	.556	No Conference						—	—
1901	T. D. Knowles	Independent	4	1	0	.800	No Conference						—	—
1902	Edwin O. Smith	Independent	3	1	0	.750	No Conference						—	—
1903	Edwin O. Smith	Independent	3	4	0	.429	No Conference						—	—
1904	Edwin O. Smith	Independent	3	1	0	.750	No Conference						—	—
1905	Edwin O. Smith	Independent	3	3	1	.500	No Conference						—	—
1906	George E. Lamson	Independent	4	3	0	.571	No Conference						—	—
1907	George E. Lamson	Independent	4	5	0	.444	No Conference						—	—
1908	George E. Lamson	Independent	4	5	1	.444	No Conference						—	—
1909	John Sullivan	Independent	6	1	0	.857	No Conference						—	—
1910	John Sullivan	Independent	3	6	0	.333	No Conference						—	—
1911	James Nicholas	Independent	0	9	0	.000	No Conference						—	—
1912	No Coach	Independent	6	6	0	.500	No Conference						—	—
1913	Robert Edger	Independent	4	6	0	.400	No Conference						—	—
1914	Charles A. Reed	Independent	0	4	0	.000	No Conference						—	—
1915	J. J. Donovan	Independent	1	7	0	.125	No Conference						—	—
1916	D. E. Chase	Independent	1	8	0	.111	No Conference						—	—
1917	John J. Donahue	Independent	1	1	0	.500	No Conference						—	—
1918	No Team (World War I)													
1919	Roy J. Guyer	Independent	5	6	0	.455	No Conference						—	—
1920	William Mellor	Independent	3	8	0	.273	No Conference						—	—
1921	Ross Swartz	Independent	4	11	0	.267	No Conference						—	—
1922	J. Wilder Tasker	Independent	8	9	0	.471	No Conference						—	—
1923	J. Wilder Tasker	Independent	4	9	0	.308	No Conference						—	—
1924	Sumner Dole	Independent	5	8	0	.385	No Conference						—	—
1925	Sumner Dole	Independent	7	5	1	.583	No Conference						—	—
1926	Sumner Dole	Independent	7	7	0	.500	No Conference						—	—
1927	Sumner Dole	Independent	3	8	0	.273	No Conference						—	—
1928	Sumner Dole	Independent	4	6	0	.400	No Conference						—	—
1929	Sumner Dole	Independent	10	7	0	.588	No Conference						—	—
1930	Sumner Dole	Independent	8	7	0	.533	No Conference						—	—
1931	Sumner Dole	Independent	2	8	0	.200	No Conference						—	—
1932	Sumner Dole	Independent	2	11	0	.154	No Conference						—	—
1933	Sumner Dole	Independent	4	9	0	.308	No Conference						—	—
1934	Sumner Dole	Independent	8	5	0	.615	No Conference						—	—
1935	Sumner Dole	Independent	3	10	1	.231	No Conference						—	—
1936	J. Orlean Christian	Independent	7	5	0	.583	No Conference						—	—
1937	J. Orlean Christian	Independent	7	8	0	.467	No Conference						—	—
1938	J. Orlean Christian	Independent	8	6	0	.571	No Conference						—	—
1939	J. Orlean Christian	Independent	7	7	0	.500	No Conference						—	—
1940	J. Orlean Christian	Independent	8	8	1	.500	No Conference						—	—
1941	J. Orlean Christian	Independent	4	10	0	.286	No Conference						—	—
1942	J. Orlean Christian	Independent	4	8	0	.333	No Conference						—	—
1943	J. Orlean Christian	Independent	8	6	0	.571	No Conference						—	—
1944	J. Orlean Christian	Independent	4	4	1	.500	No Conference						—	—
1945	J. Orlean Christian	Independent	6	2	0	.750	No Conference						—	—
1946	J. Orlean Christian	Independent	6	10	1	.375	No Conference						—	—
1947	J. Orlean Christian	Independent	12	5	0	.706	No Conference						—	—
1948	J. Orlean Christian	Yankee	13	2	0	.867	6	1	0	.857		—	—	—
1949	J. Orlean Christian	Yankee	14	5	0	.737	7	3	0	.700		—	—	—
1950	J. Orlean Christian	Yankee	7	8	0	.467	4	3	0	.571		—	—	—
1951	J. Orlean Christian	Yankee	9	9	1	.500	4	0	1	.900		—	—	—
1952	J. Orlean Christian	Yankee	9	5	1	.643	4	2	0	.667		—	—	—
1953	J. Orlean Christian	Yankee	9	6	1	.600	3	2	1	.583		—	—	—
1954	J. Orlean Christian	Yankee	9	9	0	.500	4	5	0	.444		—	—	—
1955	J. Orlean Christian	Yankee	11	6	0	.647	6	2	0	.750		—	—	—
1956	J. Orlean Christian	Yankee	9	8	2	.529	4	4	1	.500		—	—	—
1957	J. Orlean Christian	Yankee	14	10	0	.583	5	5	0	.500	3rd (6)	—	College World Series	—
1958	J. Orlean Christian	Yankee	11	5	0	.688	6	1	0	.857		—	District 1 Regional	—
1959	J. Orlean Christian	Yankee	17	2	0	.895	10	0	0	1.000	1st (6)	—	College World Series	7
1960	J. Orlean Christian	Yankee	13	3	0	.813	8	2	0	.800		—	District 1 Regional	—
1961	J. Orlean Christian	Yankee	24	19	2	.571	8	2	0	.800		—	District 1 Regional	19
1962	Larry Panciera	Yankee	7	7	1	.500	3	6	1	.350		—	—	—
1963	Larry Panciera	Yankee	14	9	0	.609	7	2	0	.778		—	District 1 Regional	—
1964	Larry Panciera	Yankee	8	12	1	.400	3	6	1	.350		—	—	—
1965	Larry Panciera	Yankee	17	8	0	.680	7	3	0	.700	T-1st (6)	—	College World Series	6
1966	Larry Panciera	Yankee	12	6	0	.667	7	3	0	.700		—	—	—
1967	Larry Panciera	Yankee	16	5	0	.762	7	3	0	.700		—	—	26
1968	Larry Panciera	Yankee	17	10	0	.630	8	1	0	.889		—	District 1 Regional	18
1969	Larry Panciera	Yankee	10	16	0	.385	6	4	0	.600		—	—	—
1970	Larry Panciera	Yankee	18	12	0	.600	8	2	0	.800		—	District 1 Regional	21
1971	Larry Panciera	Yankee	20	4	0	.833	11	3	0	.786		—	—	—
1972	Larry Panciera	Yankee	20	7	0	.741	12	0	0	1.000	1st (7)	—	College World Series	6
1973	Larry Panciera	Yankee	10	8	1	.556	4	2	1	.643		—	—	—
1974	Larry Panciera	Yankee	12	9	0	.571	4	3	0	.571		—	—	—
1975	Larry Panciera	ECAC	16	5	2	.762	Unknown						—	—
1976	Larry Panciera	ECAC	24	7	0	.774	Unknown						—	24
1977	Larry Panciera	ECAC	28	8	0	.778	Unknown						Northeast Regional	28
1978	Larry Panciera	ECAC	17	14	0	.548	Unknown						—	—
1979	Larry Panciera	ECAC	31	13	0	.705	Unknown						College World Series	8
1980	Andy Baylock	ECAC	20	22	0	.476	Unknown						—	—
1981	Andy Baylock	ECAC	24	19	2	.558	Unknown						—	
1982	Andy Baylock	ECAC	9	22	0	.290	Unknown						—	
1983	Andy Baylock	ECAC	19	14	1	.576	Unknown						—	
1984	Andy Baylock	ECAC	20	19	0	.513	Unknown						—	
1985	Andy Baylock	Big East	20	24	1	.455	12	9	0	.571	1st Northern (4)	3rd	—	
1986	Andy Baylock	Big East	18	21	0	.462	10	8	0	.556	3rd Northern (4)	—	—	
1987	Andy Baylock	Big East	23	16	0	.590	11	7	0	.611	2nd Northern (4)	4th	—	
1988	Andy Baylock	Big East	24	18	0	.571	7	11	0	.389	4th Northern (4)	—	—	
1989	Andy Baylock	Big East	26	17	0	.605	9	9	0	.500	2nd Northern (4)	4th	—	
1990	Andy Baylock	Big East	27	19	1	.587	12	9	0	.571	4th (8)	1st	Northeast Regional	
1991	Andy Baylock	Big East	16	25	1	.390	8	12	0	.400	6th (8)	—	—	
1992	Andy Baylock	Big East	26	19	1	.587	13	7	0	.650	3rd (8)	2nd	—	
1993	Andy Baylock	Big East	27	19	0	.587	12	9	0	.571	3rd (8)	2nd	Midwest Regional	
1994	Andy Baylock	Big East	30	18	0	.625	12	9	0	.571	4th (8)	1st	Midwest II Regional	
1995	Andy Baylock	Big East	13	30	1	.302	4	17	0	.190	T-7th (8)	—	—	
1996	Andy Baylock	Big East	24	23	0	.511	13	12	0	.520	4th American (6)	—	—	
1997	Andy Baylock	Big East	27	20	0	.574	11	14	0	.440	3rd American (6)	—	—	
1998	Andy Baylock	Big East	25	17	0	.595	12	10	0	.545	7th (11)	—	—	
1999	Andy Baylock	Big East	27	24	0	.529	10	17	0	.370	10th (11)	—	—	
2000	Andy Baylock	Big East	32	17	0	.653	14	9	0	.609	4th (10)	5th	—	
2001	Andy Baylock	Big East	26	25	0	.510	13	13	0	.500	6th (11)	—	—	
2002	Andy Baylock	Big East	28	22	0	.560	13	12	0	.520	7th (11)	—	—	
2003	Andy Baylock	Big East	24	23	0	.511	10	15	0	.400	9th (11)	—	—	
2004	Jim Penders	Big East	26	29	1	.473	9	17	0	.346	9th (11)	—	—	
2005	Jim Penders	Big East	34	22	0	.607	11	12	0	.478	6th (10)	—	—	
2006	Jim Penders	Big East	39	18	1	.684	18	6	1	.720	2nd (12)	6th	—	
2007	Jim Penders	Big East	34	27	0	.557	10	14	0	.417	8th (12)	2nd	—	
2008	Jim Penders	Big East	27	28	0	.491	11	16	0	.407	9th (12)	—	—	
2009	Jim Penders	Big East	36	24	0	.600	14	13	0	.519	6th (12)	2nd	—	
2010	Jim Penders	Big East	48	16	0	.750	20	6	0	.769	2nd (12)	2nd	Norwich Regional	28
2011	Jim Penders	Big East	45	20	1	.692	22	5	0	.815	1st (12)	4th	Columbia Super Regional	13
2012	Jim Penders	Big East	31	27	1	.534	16	11	0	.593	T-5th (12)	4th	—	—
2013	Jim Penders	Big East	35	28	0	.556	9	15	0	.375	8th (11)	1st	Blacksburg Regional	—
2014	Jim Penders	American	27	31	0	.466	9	14	0	.391	7th (9)	1–2 in Pool Play	—	—
2015	Jim Penders	American	35	25	0	.583	11	14	0	.440	6th (8)	3rd	—	—
2016	Jim Penders	American	38	25	0	.603	14	9	0	.609	3rd (8)	1st	Gainesville Regional	—
2017	Jim Penders	American	33	25	0	.569	14	10	0	.583	T-3rd (8)	3rd	—	—
2018	Jim Penders	American	37	22	0	.627	14	10	0	.583	T-3rd (9)	2nd	Fullerton Regional	—
2019	Jim Penders	American	39	25	0	.609	12	12	0	.500	T-4th (9)	2nd	Lubbock Regional	—
2020	Jim Penders	American	8	5	0	.615	Season canceled due to coronavirus pandemic							
2021	Jim Penders	Big East	34	19	0	.642	13	4	0	.765	1st (8)	1st	South Bend Regional	—
2022	Jim Penders	Big East	50	16	0	.758	16	5	0	.762	1st (8)	1st	Stanford Super Regional	16
2023	Jim Penders	Big East	43	15	0	.741	15	5	0	.750	1st (8)	2nd	NCAA Gainesville Regional	—
2024	Jim Penders	Big East	35	26	0	.574	17	4	0	.810	1st (8)	4th	Tallahassee Super Regional	15
2025	Jim Penders	Big East	38	21	0	.644	17	4	0	.810	T-1st (8)	2nd	—	—
2026	Jim Penders	Big East	32	26	0	.552	15	6	0	.714	T-1st (8)	4th	—	—

=== Notes ===
Sources:
