= List of UConn Huskies head baseball coaches =

The UConn Huskies baseball program is a college baseball team that represents the University of Connecticut in the Big East Conference. The Huskies compete in the National Collegiate Athletic Association (NCAA) Division I. The current head coach is Jim Penders, who has led the team since 2004.

The team has had nineteen head coaches since its first season of baseball in 1896. There was no team in 1918 due to World War I. Since its creation in 1947, the Huskies have made five appearances in the College World Series, two under J. Orlean Christian and three under Larry Panciera.

Panciera holds the highest winning percentage in Connecticut baseball history, with a .648 mark over his eighteen seasons. James Nicholas and Charles A. Reed both failed to win a game and share the mark for lowest winning percentage. Christian coached the longest, staying for 26 seasons, while nine coaches served only one season. Baylock delivered two Husky Big East Conference baseball tournament championships in 1990 and 1994, along with the only divisional championship (1985) of the seven seasons the Big East played in a two division format. Penders has won the only conference regular season championships in 2011, and at least a share each year of the reprised UConn membership beginning in 2021. Penders also delivered three more Big East Tournament titles, in 2013, 2021, and 2022.

== Key ==
General
#	Number of coaches (Note: A running total of the number of head coaches.)
GC	Games coached
†	Elected to the National College Baseball Hall of Fame

Overall
OW	Wins
OL	Losses
OT	Ties
O%	Winning percentage

Conference (Note: UConn's joined the Eastern College Athletic Conference in 1980, but conference records are incomplete. The Big East Conference began sponsoring baseball in 1985.)
CW	Wins
CL	Losses
CT	Ties
C%	Winning percentage

Postseason (Note: Postseason play involving the NCAA Division I Baseball Championship.)
PA	Total Appearances (Note: Postseason appearances include seasons with NCAA Division I Baseball Championship bids since the tournament began in 1947.)
PW	Total Wins
PL	Total Losses
WA	College World Series appearances (Note: College World Series appearances include seasons with CWS bids since the tournament began in 1947.)
WW	College World Series wins
WL	College World Series losses

Championships
DC	Division regular season (Note: The Big East Conference used a divisional format for seven seasons: 1985–1989 and 1996–1997. Regular season conference championships were not recognized in those seasons.)
CC	Conference regular season
CT	Conference tournament (Note: The Big East Conference baseball tournament began in 1985.)

== Coaches ==
List of head baseball coaches showing season(s) coached, overall records, conference records, postseason records, championships and selected awards*Statistics correct as of the end of the 2019 NCAA Division I baseball season
#	Name	Term (Note: Connecticut did not sponsor a baseball team in 1918.)	GC	OW	OL	OT	O%	CW	CL	CT	C%	PA	PW	PL	WA	WW	WL	DCs	CCs	CTs	NCs	Awards (Note: National, regional and conference coach of the year awards.)
1	No Coach	1896–1898, 1912	27	12	15	0	.444	—	—	—	—	—	—	—	—	—	—	—	—	—	0	—
2	T. D. Knowles	1899–1901	21	12	8	1	.595	—	—	—	—	—	—	—	—	—	—	—	—	—	0	—
3	Edwin O. Smith	1902–1905	22	12	9	1	.568	—	—	—	—	—	—	—	—	—	—	—	—	—	0	—
4	George E. Lamson	1906–1908	26	12	13	1	.481	—	—	—	—	—	—	—	—	—	—	—	—	—	0	—
5	John Sullivan	1909–1910	16	9	7	0	.563	—	—	—	—	—	—	—	—	—	—	—	—	—	0	—
6	James Nicholas	1911	9	0	9	0	.000	—	—	—	—	—	—	—	—	—	—	—	—	—	0	—
7	Robert Edger	1913	10	4	6	0	.400	—	—	—	—	—	—	—	—	—	—	—	—	—	0	—
8	Charles A. Reed	1914	4	0	4	0	.000	—	—	—	—	—	—	—	—	—	—	—	—	—	0	—
9	J. J. Donovan	1915	8	1	7	0	.125	—	—	—	—	—	—	—	—	—	—	—	—	—	0	—
10	D. E. Chase	1916	9	1	8	0	.111	—	—	—	—	—	—	—	—	—	—	—	—	—	0	—
11	John J. Donahue	1917	2	1	1	0	.500	—	—	—	—	—	—	—	—	—	—	—	—	—	0	—
12	Roy J. Guyer	1919	12	6	6	0	.500	—	—	—	—	—	—	—	—	—	—	—	—	—	0	—
13	William Mellor	1920	11	3	8	0	.273	—	—	—	—	—	—	—	—	—	—	—	—	—	0	—
14	Ross Swartz	1921	14	2	11	1	.179	—	—	—	—	—	—	—	—	—	—	—	—	—	0	—
15	J. Wilder Tasker	1922–1923	30	12	18	0	.400	—	—	—	—	—	—	—	—	—	—	—	—	—	0	—
16	Sumner Dole	1924–1935	156	64	90	2	.417	—	—	—	—	—	—	—	—	—	—	—	—	—	0	—
17	J. Orlean Christian	1936–1961	431	254	170	7	.597	—	—	—	—	5	8	9	2	1	4	—	7	—	0	—
18	Larry Panciera	1962–1979	462	297	160	5	.648	—	—	—	—	7	15	16	3	2	6	—	—	—	0	NCAA Northeast Region (1979)
19	Andy Baylock	1980–2003	1056	556	492	8	.530	205	206	0	.499	3	0	6	0	0	0	1	0	2	0	Big East (1992)
20	Jim Penders	2004–present	1,327	805	522	5	.605	307	210	1	.594	8	17	18	0	0	0	0	7	4	0	Big East (2006, 10, 11, 21); AAC (2016)
