= 1993 Big East Conference baseball tournament =

American college baseball tournament

- Teams: 4
- Format: Double-elimination tournament
- Finals site: Muzzy Field; Bristol, Connecticut
- Champions: St. John's (4th title)
- Winning coach: Joe Russo (4th title)
- MVP: Mike Maerten (St. John's)

1993 Big East Conference baseball standings
	Conf.						Overall
Team	W		L		T	PCT	W		L		T	PCT
Villanova ‍†‍‍	14	–	7	–	0	.667	27	–	15	–	1	.640
Seton Hall ‍‍‍	12	–	8	–	0	.600	30	–	18	–	0	.625
Connecticut ‍‍‍^{y}	12	–	9	–	0	.571	27	–	19	–	0	.587
No. 14 St. John's ‍‍‡‍^{y}	11	–	10	–	0	.524	28	–	20	–	0	.583
Boston College ‍‍‍	11	–	10	–	0	.524	22	–	14	–	0	.611
Pittsburgh ‍‍‍	10	–	11	–	0	.476	30	–	13	–	0	.698
Providence ‍‍‍	8	–	12	–	0	.400	21	–	24	–	0	.467
Georgetown ‍‍‍	5	–	16	–	0	.238	7	–	22	–	0	.241
† – Conference champion ‡ – Tournament champion y – Invited to the NCAA tournament As of June 30, 1993; Rankings from Collegiate Baseball

The 1993 Big East Conference baseball tournament was held at Muzzy Field in Bristol, Connecticut. This was the ninth annual Big East Conference baseball tournament. The fourth seeded St. John's Redmen won their fourth tournament championship and claimed the Big East Conference's automatic bid to the 1993 NCAA Division I baseball tournament.

== Format and seeding ==
The Big East baseball tournament was a 4 team double elimination tournament in 1993. The top four teams were seeded one through four based on conference winning percentage only.

Team	W	L	Pct.	GB	Seed
Villanova	14	7	.667	–	1
Seton Hall	12	8	.600	1.5	2
Connecticut	12	9	.571	1.5	3
St. John's	11	10	.524	3	4
Boston College	11	10	.524	3	–
Pittsburgh	10	11	.476	4	–
Providence	8	12	.400	5.5	–
Georgetown	5	16	.238	9	–

== Bracket ==
First round
1	Villanova	1
4	St. John's	5
2	Seton Hall	6
3	Connecticut	5
Lower round 1
1	Villanova	5
3	Connecticut	10

Semi-finals
4	St. John's	5
2	Seton Hall	4
Lower final
2	Seton Hall	9
3	Connecticut	10

Finals
4	St. John's	9	—
3	Connecticut	0	—

== Jack Kaiser Award ==
Mike Maerten was the winner of the 1993 Jack Kaiser Award. Maerten was a pitcher for St. John's.
