= 1990 Big East Conference baseball tournament =

American college baseball tournament

- Teams: 4
- Format: Double-elimination tournament
- Finals site: Muzzy Field; Bristol, Connecticut
- Champions: Connecticut (1st title)
- Winning coach: Andy Baylock (1st title)
- MVP: Craig MacDonald (Connecticut)

1990 Big East Conference baseball standings
	Conf.						Overall
Team	W		L		T	PCT	W		L		T	PCT
Seton Hall ‍†‍‍	16	–	4	–	0	.800	35	–	18	–	0	.660
St. John's ‍‍‍	15	–	6	–	0	.714	29	–	18	–	0	.617
Villanova ‍‍‍	13	–	8	–	0	.619	33	–	16	–	0	.673
Connecticut ‍‍‡‍^{y}	12	–	9	–	0	.571	27	–	19	–	1	.585
Providence ‍‍‍	11	–	10	–	0	.524	27	–	21	–	0	.563
Boston College ‍‍‍	8	–	13	–	0	.381	20	–	22	–	1	.477
Georgetown ‍‍‍	4	–	16	–	0	.200	17	–	30	–	0	.362
Pittsburgh ‍‍‍	4	–	17	–	0	.190	8	–	23	–	0	.258
† – Conference champion ‡ – Tournament champion y – Invited to the NCAA tournament As of June 30, 1990; Rankings from Collegiate Baseball

The 1990 Big East Conference baseball tournament was held at Muzzy Field in Bristol, Connecticut. This was the sixth annual Big East Conference baseball tournament. The fourth seeded Connecticut Huskies won their first tournament championship and claimed the Big East Conference's automatic bid to the 1990 NCAA Division I baseball tournament.

== Format and seeding ==
The Big East baseball tournament was a 4 team double elimination tournament in 1990. For the first time, the conference played as a single division, so the top four teams were seeded one through four based on conference winning percentage only. In previous seasons, the top two teams in each division squared off in the field.

Team	W	L	Pct.	GB	Seed
Seton Hall	16	4	.800	–	1
St. John's	15	6	.714	1	2
Villanova	13	8	.619	3.5	3
Connecticut	12	9	.571	4.5	4
Providence	11	10	.524	5.5	–
Boston College	8	13	.381	8.5	–
Georgetown	4	16	.200	12	–
Pittsburgh	4	17	.190	12.5	–

== Bracket ==
Upper round 1
1	Seton Hall	3
4	Connecticut	11
2	St. John's	0
3	Villanova	3
Lower round 1
1	Seton Hall	12
2	St. John's	3

Upper final
4	Connecticut	1
3	Villanova	0
Lower final
3	Villanova	0
1	Seton Hall	7

Final
4	Connecticut	4	–
1	Seton Hall	3	–

== All-Tournament Team ==
The following players were named to the All-Tournament Team.

Position	Player	School
1B	Phil Aiello	Seton Hall
2B	Craig MacDonald	Connecticut
3B	Ken Coffee	Connecticut
SS	Mike Groppuso	Seton Hall
C	Marek Drabinski	Connecticut
OF	Ed Rossy	Connecticut
OF	Tim Cain	Connecticut
OF	Mike Randazzo	Seton Hall
DH	Sal Tinnerello	Connecticut
P	Pete Walker	Connecticut

== Jack Kaiser Award ==
Craig MacDonald was the winner of the 1990 Jack Kaiser Award. MacDonald was a second baseman for Connecticut.
