= 1994 Big East Conference baseball tournament =

American college baseball tournament

- Teams: 4
- Format: Double-elimination tournament
- Finals site: Muzzy Field; Bristol, Connecticut
- Champions: Connecticut (2nd title)
- Winning coach: Andy Baylock (2nd title)
- MVP: Chris Bisson (Connecticut)

1994 Big East Conference baseball standings
	Conf.						Overall
Team	W		L		T	PCT	W		L		T	PCT
Pittsburgh ‍†‍‍	16	–	5	–	0	.762	31	–	16	–	1	.656
Providence ‍‍‍	13	–	8	–	0	.619	32	–	21	–	0	.604
Seton Hall ‍‍‍	12	–	8	–	0	.600	32	–	21	–	1	.602
Connecticut ‍‍‡‍^{y}	12	–	9	–	0	.571	30	–	18	–	0	.625
St. John's ‍‍‍	10	–	8	–	0	.556	20	–	16	–	0	.556
Georgetown ‍‍‍	6	–	12	–	1	.342	17	–	31	–	1	.357
Boston College ‍‍‍	5	–	14	–	0	.263	14	–	23	–	2	.385
Villanova ‍‍‍	4	–	14	–	0	.222	16	–	23	–	0	.410
† – Conference champion ‡ – Tournament champion y – Invited to the NCAA tournament As of June 30, 1994; Rankings from Collegiate Baseball

The 1994 Big East Conference baseball tournament was held at Muzzy Field in Bristol, Connecticut. This was the tenth annual Big East Conference baseball tournament. The Connecticut Huskies won their second tournament championship and claimed the Big East Conference's automatic bid to the 1994 NCAA Division I baseball tournament.

== Format and seeding ==
The Big East baseball tournament was a 4 team double elimination tournament in 1994. The top four regular season finishers were seeded one through four based on conference winning percentage only.

Team	W	L	T	Pct.	GB	Seed
Pittsburgh	16	5	0	.762	–	1
Providence	13	8	0	.619	4	2
Seton Hall	12	8	0	.600	3.5	3
Connecticut	12	9	0	.571	4	4
St. John's	10	8	0	.556	4.5	–
Georgetown	6	12	1	.333	8.5	–
Boston College	5	14	1	.263	10	–
Villanova	4	14	0	.222	9.5	–

== Bracket ==
Upper round 1
1	Pittsburgh	3
4	Connecticut	4
2	Providence	5
3	Seton Hall	13
Lower round 1
1	Pittsburgh	3
2	Providence	16

Upper final
4	Connecticut	3
3	Seton Hall	0
Lower final
3	Seton Hall	6
2	Providence	4

Final
4	Connecticut	1	4
3	Seton Hall	6	2

== Jack Kaiser Award ==
Chris Bisson was the winner of the 1994 Jack Kaiser Award. Bisson was a sophomore first baseman for Connecticut.
