= Trees Field =

Athletic facility in Pittsburgh, Pennsylvania

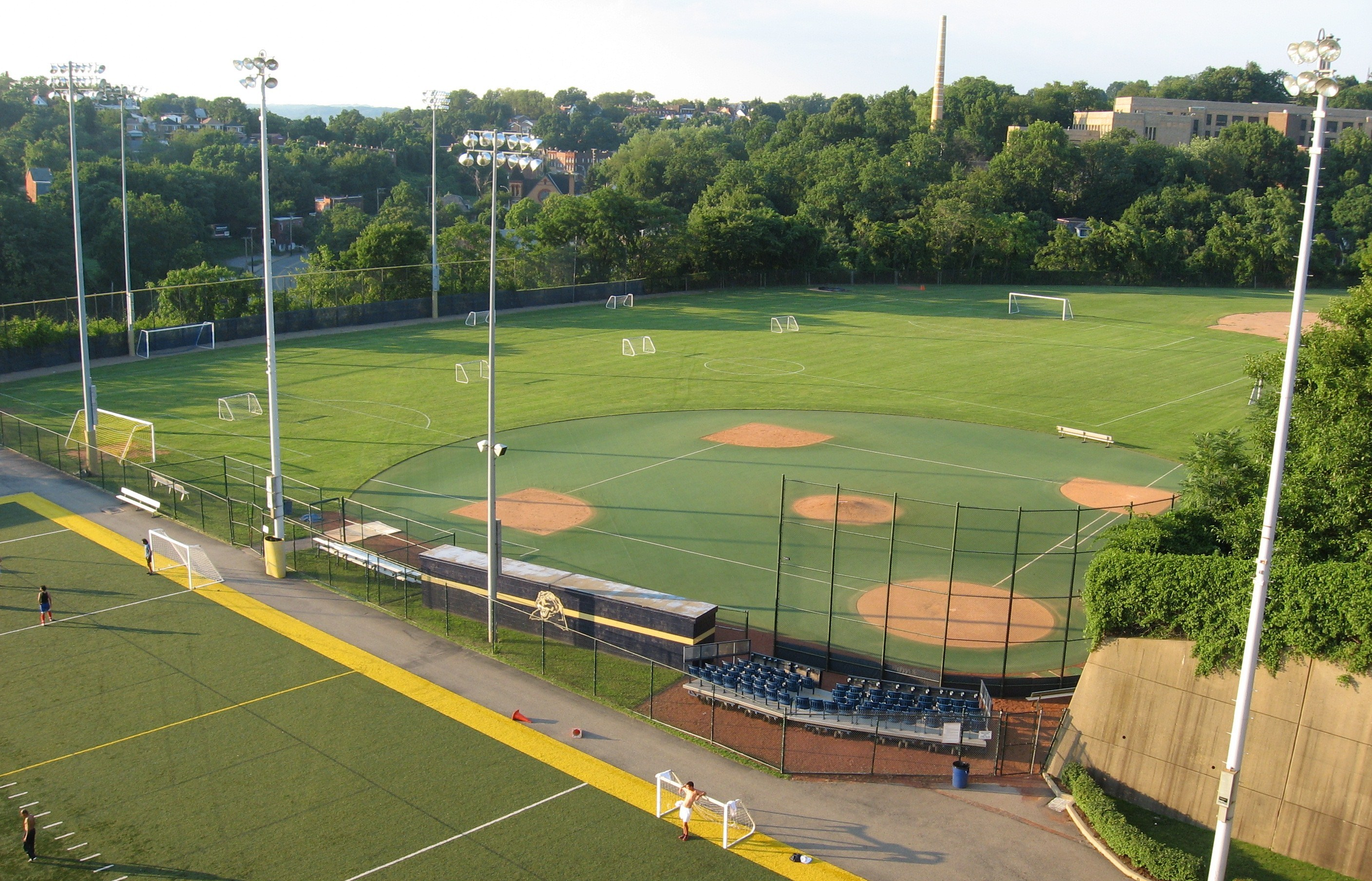
- Trees Field (right) and practice field (left), as seen in 2008
- Location: Pittsburgh, Pennsylvania
- Owner: University of Pittsburgh
- Operator: Pittsburgh Athletics
- Capacity: 500
- Type: Ballpark
- Surface: baseball: AstroTurf infield and natural grass outfield softball: natural grass outfield practice fields: AstroTurf
- Field size: Baseball: Left Field – 302 feet (92 m); Left-Center – 365 feet (111 m); Center Field – 400 feet (122 m); Right-Center – 385 feet (117 m); Right Field – 328 feet (100 m)

Construction
- Opened: 1939
- Renovated: 1999
- Closed: 2010; 16 years ago
- Demolished: TBD

Tenants
- Pittsburgh Panthers teams: baseball, softball

Trees Field is a ballpark consisting of athletic fields located at the upper campus of the University of Pittsburgh located in Pittsburgh, Pennsylvania. The facility contained both a baseball and softball fields, which were often individually referred to as "Trees Field", as well as two adjacent artificial turf practice fields.

Prior to the opening of the Petersen Sports Complex in 2010, the baseball and softball stadiums served as the home fields of the university's Panthers college baseball and softball teams and had listed capacities of 500 spectators. Prior to 1999, Trees Field had undergone greater than $500,000 in renovations that included the installation of an AstroTurf infield, lights, and the two AstroTurf practice fields. Although they still exist, it is planned that baseball and softball fields will serve as the site of a new track and field facility.

The adjacent 1.5 acre athletic field had artificial turf that was lined for two regulation flag football fields installed in 1999. The fields are utilized as multi-purpose areas for intramural sports, club sports, as practice space for the Pitt Band.
