= CCSU Baseball Field =

Baseball venue in New Britain, Connecticut, US

- Interactive map of CCSU Baseball Field
- Former names: Balf–Savin Field (?–2014)
- Location: Ella Grasso Boulevard, New Britain, Connecticut, USA
- Coordinates: 41.69603°N 72.759941°W
- Owner: Central Connecticut State University
- Operator: Central Connecticut State University
- Surface: Artificial turf
- Scoreboard: Electronic
- Field size: Left field: 330 feet (100 m); Left center field: 375 feet (114 m); Center field: 400 feet (120 m); Right center field: 375 feet (114 m); Right field: 310 feet (94 m)

Construction
- Opened: March 10, 2010

Tenant
- Central Connecticut Blue Devils baseball (NCAA DI NEC) (2010–present)

CCSU Baseball Field is a baseball venue in New Britain, Connecticut, United States. It is home to the Central Connecticut Blue Devils baseball team of the NCAA Division I Northeast Conference. It features an artificial turf surface, an electronic scoreboard, bullpens, batting cages, dugouts, and a covered press box.

The facility, constructed prior to the 2010 season, opened on March 10, 2010. In the game, Central Connecticut State lost to Hartford 12–11. During the 2009 season, while the field was under construction, the program played at Beehive Field in New Britain.

== Balf–Savin Field ==
The previous venue, known as Balf–Savin Field, was on the same site. The new facility retained the name of the old until 2014, when it dropped the previous name.

== See also ==
- List of NCAA Division I baseball venues
