= Bob Hannah Stadium =

Baseball stadium in Newark, Delaware, US

- Interactive map of Bob Hannah Stadium
- Former names: Delaware Diamond
- Address: Newark, Delaware; United States
- Coordinates: 39.663099°N 75.748021°W
- Owner: University of Delaware
- Operator: Univ. of Delaware Athletics
- Capacity: 1,300
- Type: Stadium
- Surface: Artificial turf
- Field size: Left Field - 320 feet Center Field - 400 feet Right Field - 330 feet Fence Height Left and Right Fields - 8 feet Center Field - 8 feet
- Current use: Baseball
- Public transit: DART First State bus: 16, 33, 46, 302

Tenant
- Delaware Fightin' Blue Hens baseball (NCAA)

Website
- bluehens.com/bob-hannah-stadium

Bob Hannah Stadium is a baseball stadium located at the University of Delaware in Newark, Delaware. It plays host to the Delaware Fightin' Blue Hens baseball team. The stadium's namesake, Bob Hannah, retired as head coach in 2000. The stadium seats 1,300 people for baseball. Features of the stadium include an enclosed press box, an outdoor batting cage, and banners on the outfield fence signifying Delaware's numerous conference titles and NCAA appearances.

The stadium underwent extensive renovations in 2014 that replaced the grass field with an artificial turf playing surface It also added heated dugouts, new stadium fencing and backstop area, a three tunnel batting cage, a new scoreboard, and improved bullpens. The field dimensions are 330' down the right field line, 320' down the left field line, and 400' to center field.

== See also ==
- List of NCAA Division I baseball venues
