= 1992 Big East Conference baseball tournament =

American college baseball tournament

- Teams: 4
- Format: Double-elimination tournament
- Finals site: Muzzy Field; Bristol, Connecticut
- Champions: Providence (1st title)
- Winning coach: Paul Kostacopoulos (1st title)
- MVP: Jim Foster (Providence)

1992 Big East Conference baseball standings
	Conf.						Overall
Team	W		L		T	PCT	W		L		T	PCT
St. John's ‍†‍‍	14	–	5	–	0	.737	30	–	13	–	0	.698
Seton Hall ‍‍‍	14	–	7	–	0	.667	28	–	27	–	0	.509
Connecticut ‍‍‍	13	–	7	–	0	.650	25	–	20	–	1	.554
Providence ‍‍‡‍^{y}	12	–	8	–	0	.600	29	–	23	–	0	.558
Villanova ‍‍‍	9	–	10	–	0	.474	22	–	21	–	0	.512
Georgetown ‍‍‍	6	–	15	–	0	.286	12	–	30	–	1	.291
Pittsburgh ‍‍‍	5	–	13	–	0	.278	23	–	21	–	0	.523
Boston College ‍‍‍	5	–	13	–	0	.278	18	–	17	–	1	.514
† – Conference champion ‡ – Tournament champion y – Invited to the NCAA tournament As of June 30, 1992; Rankings from Collegiate Baseball

The 1992 Big East Conference baseball tournament was held at Muzzy Field in Bristol, Connecticut. This was the eighth annual Big East Conference baseball tournament. The fourth seeded Providence Friars won their first tournament championship and claimed the Big East Conference's automatic bid to the 1992 NCAA Division I baseball tournament.

== Format and seeding ==
The Big East baseball tournament was a 4 team double elimination tournament in 1992. The top four teams were seeded one through four based on conference winning percentage only.

Team	W	L	Pct.	GB	Seed
St. John's	14	5	.737	–	1
Seton Hall	14	7	.667	1	2
Connecticut	13	7	.650	1.5	3
Providence	12	8	.600	2.5	4
Villanova	9	10	.474	5	–
Georgetown	6	15	.286	9	–
Pittsburgh	5	13	.278	9.5	–
Boston College	5	13	.278	9.5	–

== Bracket ==
Upper round 1
1	St. John's	4
4	Providence	6
2	Seton Hall	2
3	Connecticut	14
Lower round 1
1	St. John's	3
2	Seton Hall	4

Upper final
4	Providence	13
3	Connecticut	2
Lower final
3	Connecticut	4
2	Seton Hall	3

Final
4	Providence	8	5
3	Connecticut	11	3

== Jack Kaiser Award ==
Jim Foster was the winner of the 1992 Jack Kaiser Award. Foster was a catcher for Providence.
