= Bill Mellor =

American baseball player (1874-1940)

- First baseman
- Born: June 6, 1874; Camden, New Jersey, U.S.
- Died: November 5, 1940 (aged 66); Bridgeton, Rhode Island, U.S.
- Batted: Right Threw: Right

MLB debut
- July 28, 1902, for the Baltimore Orioles

Last MLB appearance
- August 8, 1902, for the Baltimore Orioles

MLB statistics
- Batting average: .361
- Home runs: 0
- Runs batted in: 5
- Stats at Baseball Reference

Teams
- Baltimore Orioles (1902)

William Harpin Mellor (June 6, 1874 – November 5, 1940) was an American Major League Baseball first baseman. Mellor played for the Baltimore Orioles in 1902. In 10 career games, he had 13 hits in 36 at-bats, with 5 RBIs. He batted and threw right-handed. Mellor attended both Brown University and the University of Virginia.

Mellor was born in Camden, New Jersey and died in Bridgeton, Rhode Island. He served as the head baseball coach at Connecticut Agricultural College—now known as the University of Connecticut—for one season, in 1920.
