= Central Connecticut Blue Devils baseball =

Central Connecticut Blue Devils
- 2027 Central Connecticut Blue Devils baseball team
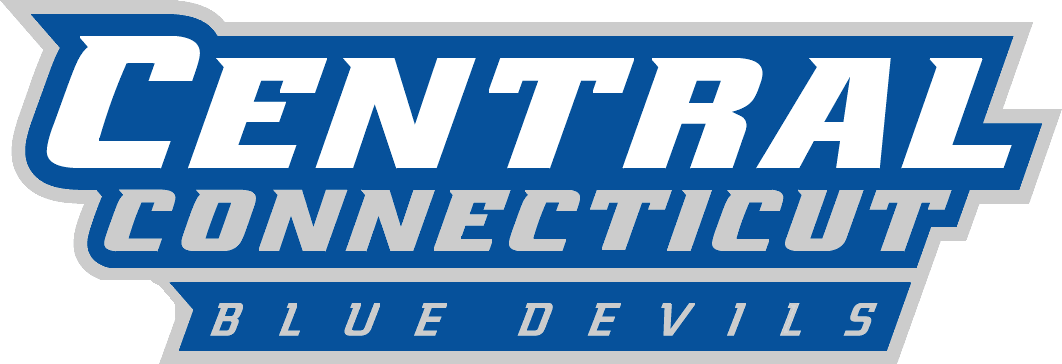
- Founded: 1935
- University: Central Connecticut State University
- Head coach: Pat Hall (1st season)
- Conference: Northeast
- Location: New Britain, Connecticut
- Home stadium: CCSU Baseball Field (capacity: 1,000)
- Nickname: Devils
- Colors: Blue and white

NCAA tournament appearances
- Division II; 1973, 1975 Division I 2002, 2003, 2004, 2010, 2017, 2019, 2021, 2023, 2025

Conference tournament champions
- 2002, 2003, 2004, 2010, 2017, 2019, 2021, 2023, 2025

Conference regular season champions
- 2001, 2003, 2004, 2006, 2023

The Central Connecticut Blue Devils baseball team is a varsity intercollegiate athletic team of Central Connecticut State University in New Britain, Connecticut, United States. The team is a member of the Northeast Conference, which is part of the National Collegiate Athletic Association's Division I. Central Connecticut State's first baseball team was fielded in 1935. During its time in NCAA Division II, the team went to the national baseball tournament twice. The team plays its home games at CCSU Baseball Field in New Britain, which opened in 2010 and seats 1,000. The Blue Devils are coached by Pat Hall.

The Blue Devils have claimed nine Northeast Conference baseball tournament championships and appeared in the NCAA Division I Baseball Championship nine times. The 2010 team set several offensive school records en route to a recent Regional appearance in the Norwich Regional. The 2025 team was the most recent to reach the NCAA tournament.

== Central Connecticut in the NCAA tournament ==
Year	Record	Pct	Notes
2002	0–2	.000	Austin Regional
2003	0–2	.000	Tempe Regional
2004	0–2	.000	Oklahoma City Regional
2010	0–2	.000	Norwich Regional
2017	0–2	.000	Fort Worth Regional
2019	1–2	.333	Fayetteville Regional
2021	0–2	.000	Eugene Regional
2023	0–2	.000	Columbia Regional
2025	0–2	.000	Auburn Regional
TOTALS	1-18	.053	

== Coaching history ==
This table reflects the documented coaching history through the 2026 season.

Name	Seasons	W	L	T	Pct
Jim Kaiser	7	36	11	0	.766
Ed Creed	3	24	6	0	.800
Hank Majlinger	30	353	168	0	.678
Julian Wojtusik	7	63	105	1	.376
George Redman	14	258	274	4	.485
Charlie Hickey	27	712	608	5	.539

== Retired numbers ==
Central Connecticut has one retired number in baseball, having retired Ricky Bottalico's jersey on January 22, 2000.

Year	Name	Position	Career	Year of Retirement
27	Ricky Bottalico	P	1991	2000

== Season-by-season record ==
Season	Coach	Overall	Conference	Standing	Postseason
Charlie Hickey (Northeast Conference) (2000–present)
2000	Charlie Hickey	17–31–1	9–11	3rd (North)	
2001	Charlie Hickey	30–22	14–8	T-1st (North)	NEC Tournament
2002	Charlie Hickey	34–23	18–9	3rd	NCAA Regional
2003	Charlie Hickey	31–17–2	19–6	1st	NCAA Regional
2004	Charlie Hickey	41–17–1	20–4	1st	NCAA Regional
2005	Charlie Hickey	19–28	10–14	7th	
2006	Charlie Hickey	33–18	16–7	1st	NEC Tournament
2007	Charlie Hickey	26–26	14–14	4th	NEC Tournament
2008	Charlie Hickey	25–24	18–9	2nd	NEC Tournament
2009	Charlie Hickey	26–22	16–11	3rd	NEC Tournament
2010	Charlie Hickey	33–23	18–14	3rd	NCAA Regional
2011	Charlie Hickey	26–25–1	17–14	5th	NEC Tournament
2012	Charlie Hickey	28–24	19–13	T-3rd	NEC Tournament
2013	Charlie Hickey	28–25	16–16	T-5th	
2014	Charlie Hickey	27–22	14–10	2nd	NEC tournament
2015	Charlie Hickey	17–31	9–15	6th	
2016	Charlie Hickey	23–34	15–17	4th	NEC tournament
2017	Charlie Hickey	36–22	21–7	2nd	NCAA Regional
2018	Charlie Hickey	18–28	12–16	6th	
2019	Charlie Hickey	31-23	16-8	2nd	NCAA Regional
2020	Charlie Hickey	4-8	0-0	T-1st	Cancelled due to the COVID-19 pandemic
2021	Charlie Hickey	28-15	21-9	2nd	NCAA Regional
2022	Charlie Hickey	29-18	17-10	3rd	NEC tournament
2023	Charlie Hickey	36-14	25-5	1st	NCAA Regional
Charlie Hickey:		646-540-5	374-247		
Total:					
National champion Postseason invitational champion Conference regular season champion Conference regular season and conference tournament champion Division regular season champion Division regular season and conference tournament champion Conference tournament champion

== See also ==
- List of NCAA Division I baseball programs
