= Andy Baylock =

American football coach

Biographical details
- Born: June 22, 1938 (age 88)

Playing career
- 1956–1959: Central Connecticut football
- 1957–1960: Central Connecticut baseball

Coaching career (HC unless noted)

Baseball
- 1962: Michigan (Grad Asst.)
- 1963: UConn (Freshmen)
- 1964–1979: UConn (Asst.)
- 1980–2003: UConn

Football
- 1963–1978: UConn (Asst.)

Head coaching record
- Overall: 556–492–8

Andy Baylock (born June 22, 1938) is a college athletics coach and administrator, most notable for serving as the head coach of the UConn Huskies baseball team from 1980–2003, appearing three times in the NCAA tournament and winning a pair of Big East Conference baseball tournament titles. At the time of his retirement, he was UConn's all-time wins leader, with 556, since eclipsed by his successor Jim Penders.

== College career ==
Baylock attended Central Connecticut State University in New Britain, Connecticut, and was a four year letter-man in football and baseball. He was a captain for both teams his senior year.

== Coaching career ==
After his playing days, Baylock attended the University of Michigan where he earned a Master's degree and served as a graduate assistant coach with the Michigan Wolverines baseball team. He then arrived at UConn as the freshman baseball coach for one season, before becoming a football and baseball assistant for 15 years. During his tenure on the UConn baseball staff under head coach Larry Panciera, the Huskies appeared in 3 College World Series, 4 additional NCAA tournaments, and won their conference 8 times. In 1973, 1974 and 1979, Baylock skippered the Falmouth Commodores, a collegiate summer baseball team in the Cape Cod Baseball League.

After Panciera's retirement following the 1979 season, Baylock ascended to the head coaching position, a role he would occupy for 24 seasons, before stepping down in 2003.

== Head coaching record ==
The following table shows Baylock's record as a head coach.

Record table
Season	Team	Overall	Conference	Standing	Postseason
Connecticut Huskies (Eastern College Athletic Conference) (1980–1984)
1980	Connecticut	20–22			
1981	Connecticut	24–19–2			
1982	Connecticut	9–22			
1983	Connecticut	19–14–1			
1984	Connecticut	20–18			
Connecticut:		92–95–3			
Connecticut Huskies (Big East Conference) (1985–2003)
1985	Connecticut	20–24–1	11–7	1st (North)	Big East tournament, 3rd
1986	Connecticut	18–21	10–8	3rd (North)	
1987	Connecticut	23–16	11–7	2nd (North)	Big East tournament, 4th
1988	Connecticut	24–18	7–11	4th (North)	
1989	Connecticut	26–17	9–9	2nd (North)	Big East tournament, 4th
1990	Connecticut	27–19–1	12–9	4th	NCAA Northeast Regional, 0–2
1991	Connecticut	16–25–1	8–12	6th	
1992	Connecticut	25–20–1	13–7	3rd	Big East tournament, 2nd
1993	Connecticut	27–19	12–9	3rd	NCAA Midwest II Regional, 0–2
1994	Connecticut	30–18	12–9	4th	NCAA Midwest Regional, 0–2
1995	Connecticut	13–30–1	4–17	8th	
1996	Connecticut	24–23	13–12	4th (American)	
1997	Connecticut	27–20	11–13	3rd (American)	
1998	Connecticut	25–17	12–11	7th	
1999	Connecticut	27–24	10–16	10th	
2000	Connecticut	32–17	14–9	4th	Big East tournament, T-5th
2001	Connecticut	26–25	13–13	T-5th	
2002	Connecticut	28–22	13–12	7th	
2003	Connecticut	24–23	10–15	9th	
Connecticut:		464–397–5	205–206		
Total:		556–492–8			
National champion Postseason invitational champion Conference regular season champion Conference regular season and conference tournament champion Division regular season champion Division regular season and conference tournament champion Conference tournament champion
