= J. O. Christian Field =

Former baseball stadium in Storrs, Connecticut

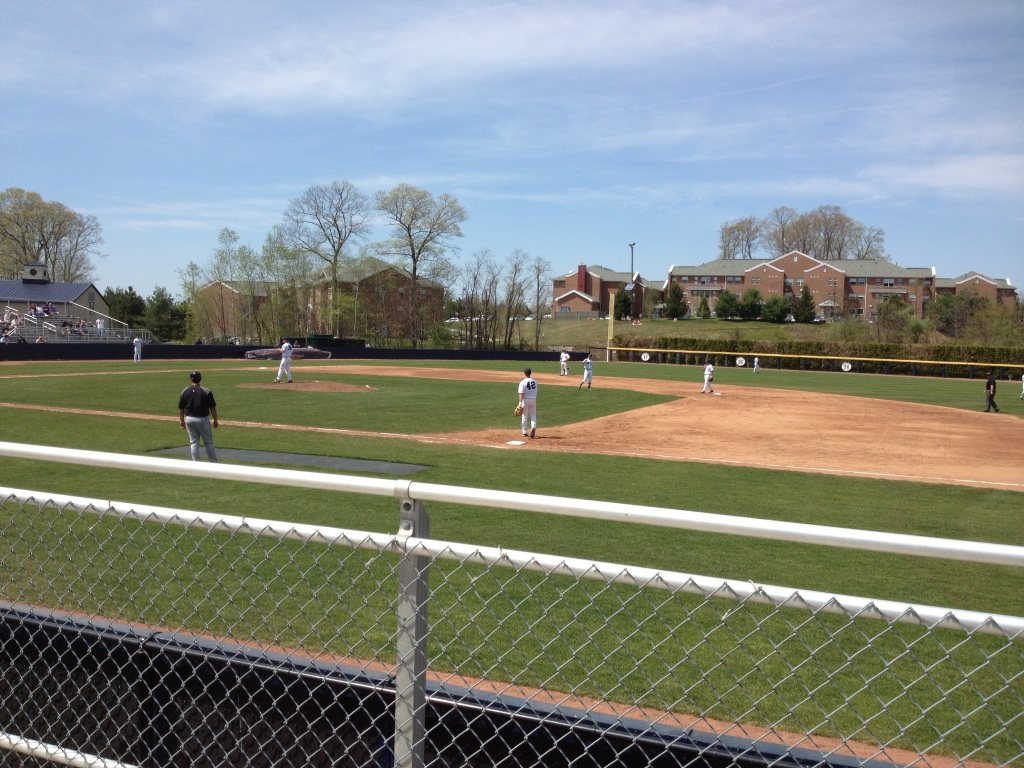
- The infield at J.O. Christian field prior to a doubleheader between UConn and Rutgers on April 20, 2012.
- Interactive map of J. O. Christian Field
- Location: Jim Calhoun Way east of Separatist Road, Storrs, Connecticut, USA
- Coordinates: 41.8003672°N 72.2567368°W
- Owner: University of Connecticut
- Operator: University of Connecticut
- Capacity: 2,000
- Surface: Natural grass, Beam clay
- Field size: Left field: 340 feet (100 m); Left center: 370 feet (110 m); Center field: 405 feet (123 m); Right center: 370 feet (110 m); Right field: 340 feet (100 m)

Construction
- Built: 1968
- Expanded: 1993
- Closed: May 11, 2019
- Demolished: June 2019

Tenants
- UConn (NCAA, Big East) 1968–2019

J. O. Christian Field was a baseball stadium in Storrs, Connecticut. It was the home field of the Connecticut Huskies baseball team of the NCAA Division I's American Athletic Conference (The American) from 1968 through 2019. The stadium held seating for 2,000 people. It was named after former UConn baseball coach and athletic director, J. Orlean Christian. UConn played their last game at J.O. Christian field on May 11, 2019, with demolition the following month.

In the offseason following the 2011 season, the university announced fundraising efforts for a new baseball stadium. The new stadium was built across the street from the existing J. O. Christian Field, behind the site of the new Morrone Stadium, with room for 1,500. Construction began in mid-2018, with the new facility including artificial turf to facilitate play early in the season, an indoor training facility, lights, and a scoreboard.

When construction on the full athletics complex (baseball, softball, soccer, and performance center) was complete, the Recreation Field Complex, a turf field, was built on the site for use by the soccer and lacrosse teams as well as intramural sports. It did not retain the name J. O. Christian Field.

== See also ==
- List of NCAA Division I baseball venues
