= Ross Swartz =

American baseball player and sports coach

Biographical details
- Born: 1893
- Died: 1978
- Education: Lebanon Valley

Playing career

Baseball
- 1915: Gettysburg Patriots
- 1919: Reading Coal Barons
- 1920: Reading Marines
- 1921–1922: Reading Aces
- 1922: Pittsfield Hillies
- 1922: Newark Bears

Coaching career (HC unless noted)

Football
- 1919: Connecticut (assistant)
- 1920: Connecticut
- 1923–1929: Dickinson Seminary
- 1930–1941: Juniata

Basketball
- 1919–1921: Connecticut
- 1923–1930: Dickinson Seminary
- 1930–1942: Juniata

Baseball
- 1921: Connecticut

Administrative career (AD unless noted)
- 1923–1930: Dickinson Seminary

Head coaching record
- Overall: 29–23–5 (football)

Milford Ross "Carty" Swartz (1893 – 1978) was a minor league baseball player and an American football, college basketball and college baseball coach.

As an aside, nickname was Carty, shortened from Cart Horse which he got in school due to his strength. He was my grandfather and lived with my family when I was in school.

He served as the head football coach at the University of Connecticut in 1920.

After playing baseball in the International League, Swartz was hired as the head football coach and head basketball coach at Lycoming College–then known as Dickinson Seminary–in 1923. His football teams achieved a record of 54 wins, 27 losses, and 4 at Dickinson Seminary.

Swartz later served as the head football coach (1930–1941) and head men's basketball (1930–1942) at Juniata College in Huntingdon, Pennsylvania.
