= Jim Penders =

American baseball coach

Current position
- Title: Head coach
- Team: UConn
- Conference: Big East
- Record: 805–522–5 (.606)

Biographical details
- Born: 1972 (age 53–54); Vernon, Connecticut, U.S.
- Education: University of Connecticut

Playing career
- 1991–1994: UConn

Coaching career (HC unless noted)
- 1997–1998: UConn (GA)
- 1999–2003: UConn (assistant)
- 2004–present: UConn

Head coaching record
- Overall: 805–522–5 (.606)

Accomplishments and honors

Championships
- 7x Big East Conference (2011, 2021–2026); 4x Big East Conference Tournament (2013, 2016, 2021, 2022)

Awards
- 4x Big East Coach of the Year (2006, 2010, 2011, 2021); The American Coach of the Year (2016)

James F. Penders (born 1972) is the coach of the UConn Huskies baseball team. Penders began his time with the Huskies in 1991 as a player on the varsity team. In his senior year, he was named a co-captain and helped to lead the Huskies to victory in the 1994 Big East Conference baseball tournament. Penders was named an assistant coach of the Huskies in 1997 and became head coach after the 2003 season.

== Playing years ==
Penders was a co-captain in 1994. The Huskies finished with a 26–19 record and won the Big East Tournament before losing to Georgia Tech and Long Beach State in the NCAA Regionals and being eliminated. Penders finished the season batting .354 with seven home runs and 46 RBIs.

== Coaching career ==
Penders was hired as a graduate assistant baseball coach before being named a full assistant in 1999. He was promoted to head coach in 2003 after Andy Baylock left the program. Penders won the Big East Coach of the Year honors in 2006, 2010 and 2011, taking the Huskies to the NCAA tournament in each of those three seasons. In 2011, Penders led the Huskies to their first Super Regional. They were eliminated by South Carolina, two games to none. On March 27, 2012, Penders earned his 300th career victory, all at Connecticut, with a win over in-state rival Hartford. The 8th-seeded Huskies won the 2013 Big East Conference baseball tournament in the league's final year before the split.

== Head coaching record ==
Record table
Season	Team	Overall	Conference	Standing	Postseason
UConn Huskies (Big East Conference) (2004–2013)
2004	Connecticut	26–29–1	9–17	T–9th	
2005	Connecticut	34–22	11–12	6th	
2006	Connecticut	39–18–1	18–6–1	2nd	
2007	Connecticut	34–27	10–14	8th	
2008	Connecticut	27–28	11–16	T–9th	
2009	Connecticut	36–24	14–13	6th	
2010	Connecticut	48–16	20–6	2nd	NCAA Regional
2011	Connecticut	45–20–1	22–5	1st	NCAA Super Regional
2012	Connecticut	31–27–1	16–11	T–5th	
2013	Connecticut	35–28	9–15	8th	NCAA Regional
:			169–123–1		
UConn Huskies (American Athletic Conference) (2014–2020)
2014	UConn	27–31	9–14	T–6th (9)	
2015	UConn	35–25	11–13	6th (8)	
2016	UConn	38–25	14–9	3rd (8)	NCAA Regional
2017	UConn	33–25	14–10	T–3rd (8)	
2018	UConn	37–22–1	14–10	T–3rd (8)	NCAA Regional
2019	UConn	39–25	12–12	T–4th (9)	NCAA Regional
2020	UConn	8–5	0–0		Season canceled due to COVID-19
:			74–68		
UConn Huskies (Big East Conference) (2021–present)
2021	UConn	34–19	13–4	1st	NCAA Regional
2022	UConn	50–16	16–4	1st	NCAA Super Regional
2023	UConn	44–17	15–5	1st	NCAA Regional
2024	UConn	35–26	17–4	1st	NCAA Super Regional
2025	UConn	38–21	17–4	T–1st	Big East Tournament
2026	UConn	32–26	15–6	T–1st	Big East Tournament
UConn:		805–522–5 (.606)	307–210–1 (.594)		
Total:		805–522–5 (.606)			
National champion Postseason invitational champion Conference regular season champion Conference regular season and conference tournament champion Division regular season champion Division regular season and conference tournament champion Conference tournament champion

== Personal life ==
Penders' father, Jim Penders, Sr., also played baseball at the University of Connecticut and was a member of the Huskies team that played in the 1965 College World Series. Penders, Sr. was the head baseball coach at East Catholic High School from 1969 to 2012 and won four state championships.

His brother, Rob Penders, played for the Richmond Roosters of the Frontier League in 1996. He is the current head baseball coach at St. Edward's University.

His grandfather, Jim, was the head baseball coach at Stratford High School from 1931 to 1968 and won four state championships.

His uncle, Tom Penders, served as the head basketball coach at Tufts University, Columbia University, Fordham University, the University of Rhode Island, University of Texas at Austin, George Washington University and the University of Houston.

From 1994–1996, Penders lived in Washington, D.C. where he worked as a political fundraiser for Senator Tom Harkin of Iowa.

Penders and his wife, Brooke, reside in Old Wethersfield. They have three children.

== See also ==
- List of current NCAA Division I baseball coaches
