= UConn Huskies baseball =

- 2026 UConn Huskies baseball team
- Founded: 1896; 130 years ago
- University: University of Connecticut
- Head coach: Jim Penders (23rd season)
- Conference: Big East
- Location: Storrs, Connecticut
- Home stadium: Elliot Ballpark (Capacity: 1,500); Dunkin' Park (Capacity: 6,121)
- Nickname: Huskies, HookC
- Colors: National flag blue and white

College World Series appearances
- 1957, 1959, 1965, 1972, 1979

NCAA regional champions
- 1979, 2011, 2022, 2024

NCAA tournament appearances
- 1957, 1958, 1959, 1960, 1961, 1963, 1965 1968, 1970, 1972, 1977, 1979, 1990, 1993, 1994, 2010, 2011, 2013, 2016, 2018, 2019, 2021, 2022, 2023, 2024

Conference tournament champions
- Big East: 1990, 1994, 2013, 2021, 2022; American: 2016

Conference regular season champions
- Big East: 2011, 2021, 2022, 2023, 2024, 2025, 2026; Yankee: 1959, 1965, 1972

The UConn Huskies baseball team represents the University of Connecticut, in Storrs, Connecticut, in college baseball. The program is classified as NCAA Division I, and the team competes in the Big East Conference. The team is coached by Jim Penders.

As of 2024, UConn has appeared in five College World Series and 25 NCAA tournaments.

== History ==
The Huskies were a regional power under coaches J. Orlean Christian and Larry Panciera, making 12 appearances in the NCAA tournament and five appearances in the College World Series from 1957 to 1979. The Huskies made their first Super Regional appearance in 2011, defeating traditional power Clemson before falling to eventual national champion South Carolina. Connecticut has since returned to the Super Regionals twice more. In 2022, the Huskies defeated Maryland before falling to Stanford. Two years later, the program downed Oklahoma before falling to Florida State. Connecticut has claimed five Big East Conference baseball tournament championships (1990, 1994, 2013, 2021 and 2022), seven Big East Regular season championships (2011, 2021, 2022, 2023, 2024, 2025, and 2026) and one divisional championship in the first year of Big East competition in 1985. During their seven-year tenure in the American Athletic Conference, the Huskies had three NCAA tournament appearances and won the 2016 American Athletic Conference baseball tournament.

== Facilities ==
The Huskies play at the 1,500-seat Elliot Ballpark, located at the southwest edge of the campus athletic complex, which opened for the 2021 season. It is named after the primary donors to the ballpark project, the Elliot family, headed by Doug Elliot, a former UConn baseball player who became an executive with The Hartford. Elliot Ballpark replaced J. O. Christian Field, a 2,000-seat stadium formally located across the street from the new ballpark. The team plays select home games at minor league venues in Connecticut, most frequently Dunkin' Donuts Park in Hartford, Connecticut, Senator Thomas J. Dodd Memorial Stadium in Norwich, Connecticut, and New Britain Stadium in New Britain, Connecticut, all of which seat over 6,000 spectators.

== Head coaches ==
The following is a list of all UConn coaches and their known records, through the end of the 2023 season.

Coach	Tenure	Wins	Losses	Ties	%
(no coach)	1896–1898	6	9	0	.400
T. D. Knowles	1899–1901	11	9	1	.555
Edwin O. Smith	1902–1905	13	9	1	.591
George E. Lamson	1906–1908	12	13	1	.480
John Sullivan	1909–1910	9	7	0	.563
James Nicholas	1911	0	9	0	.000
No coach	1912	6	6	0	.500
Robert Edger	1913	4	6	0	.400
Charles A. Reed	1914	0	4	0	.000
J. J. Donovan	1915	1	7	0	.125
D. E. Chase	1916	1	8	0	.111
John J. Donahue	1917	1	1	0	.500
Roy J. Guyer	1919	6	6	0	.500
William Mellor	1920	3	8	0	.273
Ross Swartz	1921	2	11	1	.154
J. Wilder Tasker	1922–1923	12	18	0	.400
Sumner Dole	1924–1935	64	90	2	.416
J. Orlean Christian	1936–1961	254	170	7	.599
Larry Panciera	1962–1979	297	160	5	.650
Andy Baylock	1980–2003	556	492	8	.530
Jim Penders	2004–present	805	522	5	.606

== Huskies in the pros ==
Connecticut has produced dozens of professional players, coaches, and umpires, most notably George Springer (Houston Astros, Toronto Blue Jays), Jeff Fulchino (Florida Marlins, Kansas City Royals, Houston Astros, San Diego Padres), Jesse Carlson (Detroit Tigers, Houston Astros, Texas Rangers, Toronto Blue Jays, Boston Red Sox), Bob Schaefer (numerous coaching positions with 11 teams, currently Washington Nationals), Charles Nagy (Cleveland Indians, San Diego Padres; coach Arizona Diamondbacks), Walt Dropo (1950 AL Rookie of the Year), Jim Reynolds (umpire), and Dan Iassogna (umpire). Ten players were selected in the 2011 MLB draft, including first round picks Matt Barnes (Boston Red Sox) and George Springer (Houston Astros). Anthony Kay was also drafted in the first round by the New York Mets. As of 2026, George Springer, Ben Caspirius and PJ Poulin and Andrew Sears are on active Major League rosters.

== Player awards ==
=== Retired numbers ===
The Huskies have retired three numbers in their more than 100-year history.

Uconn Huskies baseball retired numbers
No.	Name	Pos.	Career
17	J. O. Christian	Head coach	1936–61
28	Andy Baylock	Head coach	1980–2004
35	Larry Panciera	Head coach	1962–79

=== All-Americans ===
The following All-Americans are recognized by the University of Connecticut. First team selections are noted with a check.

Season	Name	Pos.	ABCA	BA	CB	NCBWA
1958	Bob Wedin	P	✓	N/A		
1959	Moe Morhardt	OF	✓	N/A		
1959	Bill Stevens	OF		N/A		
1961	Joe Clement	P		N/A		
1963	Eddie Jones	P	✓	N/A		
1967	George Greer	OF		N/A		
1968	George Greer	OF		N/A		
1972	John Ihlenburg	3B		N/A		
1976	Tom Germano	P		N/A		
1979	Colin McLaughlin	P		N/A		
1979	Randy LaVigne	OF		N/A		
1988	Charles Nagy	P			N/A	
1993	Dennis Dwyer	OF				N/A
1994	Brian Majeski	OF				N/A
1996	Jason Grabowski	DH			✓	N/A
1997	Jason Grabowski	DH				N/A
1999	Mike Scott	OF				N/A
2010	Mike Nemeth	1B				
2011	Matt Barnes	P	✓		✓	✓
2011	George Springer	OF	✓		✓	✓
2011	Kevin Vance	P				
2013	L. J. Mazzilli	2B				
2015	Vinny Siena	3B				
2015	Carson Cross	P				
2016	Anthony Kay	P				
2019	Mason Feole	P			✓	
