= Muzzy Field =

Stadium in Bristol, Connecticut, US

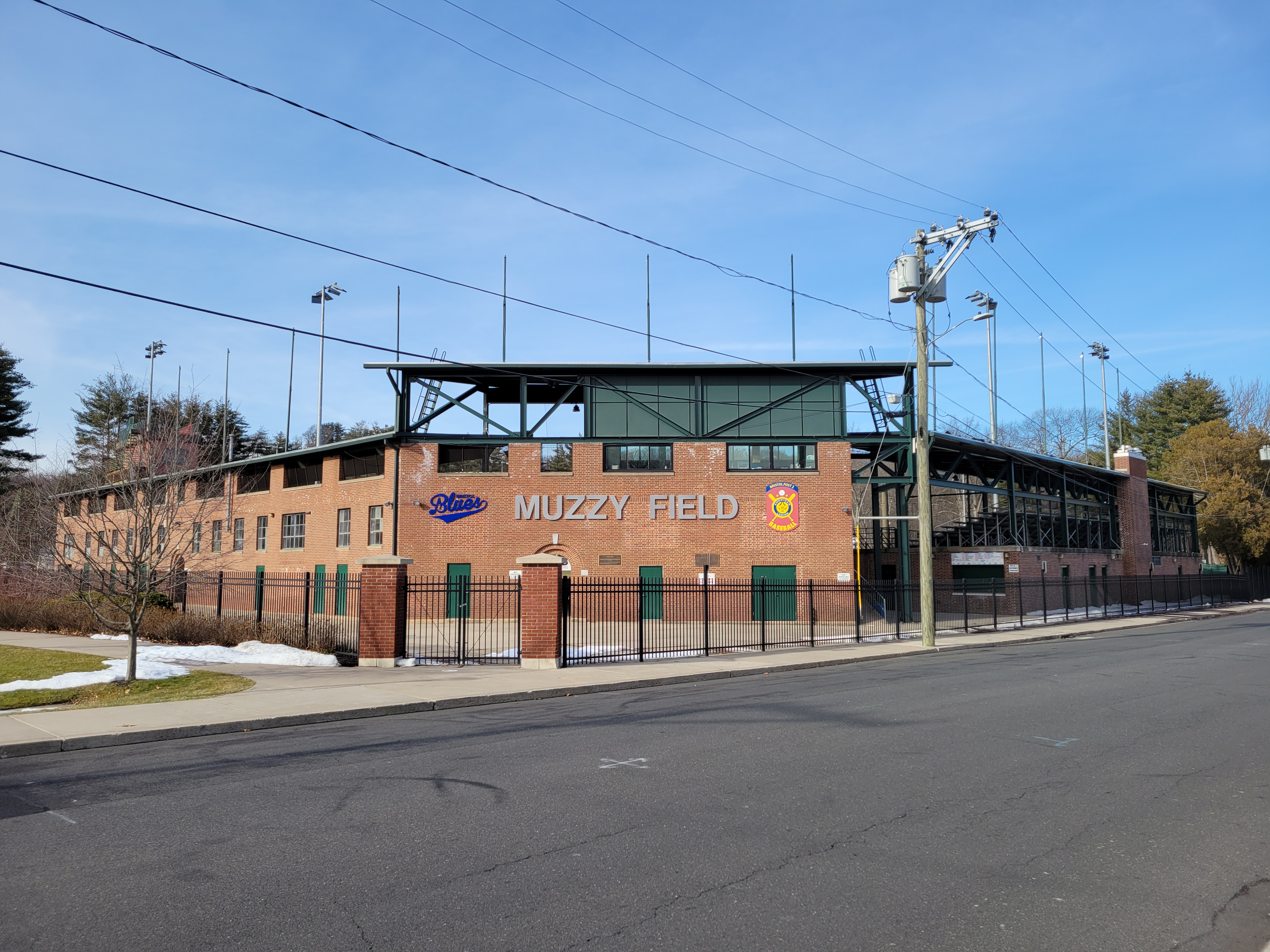
- Interactive map of Muzzy Field
- Location: Park Street and Muzzy Street, Bristol, Connecticut, US
- Coordinates: 41.673176°N 72.959459°W
- Capacity: 4,900
- Field size: 339 ft. (LF); 359 ft. (Left center); 402 ft. (CF); 369 ft. (Deep right center); 330 ft. (Right center); 326 ft. (RF)

Construction
- Built: 1912 (wooden stands)
- Opened: 1914 (official)
- Renovated: 1939 (brick grandstand)
- Expanded: 2012–15

Tenants
- Bristol Blues (FCBL) 2015–2019, (NECBL) 2020–present; Bristol Collegiate Baseball Club (NECBL) 2010; Bristol Nighthawks (NECBL) 1994–1995; Bristol Red Sox (EL) 1972–1982; Bristol Owls (CL) 1949–1950; Bristol Red Sox (EL) 1973–1982; Bristol Central High School; Bristol Eastern High School; Saint Paul Catholic High School; baseball and football

Muzzy Field is a stadium in Bristol, Connecticut, adjacent to Rockwell Park. In 1912, it was given to the Public Welfare Association in the city of Bristol by Commissioner Adrian Muzzy in memory of his two sons, for the express purpose of amateur athletics, officially opening on 8 July 1914, for both baseball and football. In 1939, after a fire, the 4,900-capacity brick-faced grandstand was built. It features a ring of tall pine trees that line the outside of the outfield wall and the grandstand.

Muzzy Field hosts high school sports, primarily baseball and football. Three high schools use the field: Bristol Central High School, Bristol Eastern High School, and Saint Paul Catholic High School. Muzzy Field is the site of the football "Battle for the Bell" between Bristol Eastern and Bristol Central, held every Thanksgiving morning, with the winner claiming the bell for the following year.

In summer, Muzzy Field hosts collegiate baseball teams: since 2015, the Bristol Blues of the New England Collegiate Baseball League; and formerly, the Bristol Collegiate Baseball Club (2010) and the Bristol Nighthawks (1994–1995), both of the New England Collegiate Baseball League.

== Former uses ==
In 1919, Babe Ruth hit a home run to a crowd of almost five thousand people. Martín Dihigo, Warren Spahn, Satchel Paige, Johnny Mize, Vince Lombardi, Jim Rice, and Fred Lynn played at Muzzy Field.

Muzzy Field was the home of the Double-A Bristol Red Sox of the Eastern League from 1972 to 1982. Former Boston Red Sox stars Jim Rice, Fred Lynn, and Butch Hobson honed their skills with the "BriSox". The ballpark also housed the old Bristol Owls of the Class-B Colonial League in 1949 and 1950, and various amateur baseball teams, notably the Bristol En-Dees and the local American Legion team.

The University of Hartford's baseball program used the venue for some home games prior to opening Fiondella Field in 2006. Muzzy Field was the site of the Big East Conference baseball championship tournament from 1985 to 1995.

In 1991, Joe Archambeault put together a barnstorming exhibition New England Grey Sox team, including former Boston Red Sox players and other major-leaguers including Bill "Spaceman" Lee, Mark "The Bird" Fidrych, Bob Stanley, Dick McAuliffe, Dick Radatz, Ozzie Virgil, and Mike Stenhouse. They played against a team of local men, the Undefeated Bristol Fradette Agency, on June 1, 1991, in front of 5,000 fans.

In 2004 the stadium was also the site of an American Idol audition.

== Renovations ==
In 2012 and 2013, the City of Bristol approved a renovation of the ballpark to include a new front entrance and public concourse, new lighting, seating, ADA improvements and a new grandstand enclosure along the Muzzy Street side of the stadium connecting to the existing grandstand.

Further renovations in 2015, coinciding with the arrival of the Bristol Blues club, included a new rooftop press box, an extension of the roof, and an electronic sign at the corner of Park and Muzzy Streets to advertise events.

== Bibliography ==
- Malan, Douglas S. (September 28, 2009). Muzzy Field: Tales from a Forgotten Ballpark. iUniverse. ISBN 978-1935278849.
