= Rob Sheppard =

American college baseball coach

Current position
- Title: Head coach
- Team: Seton Hall
- Conference: Big East
- Record: 618–547–4

Biographical details
- Education: Seton Hall University '92

Playing career
- 1989–1992: Seton Hall
- Position: Infielder

Coaching career (HC unless noted)
- 1995–2000: Seton Hall (asst.)
- 2001: Seton Hall
- 2002–2003: Seton Hall (asst.)
- 2004–present: Seton Hall

Head coaching record
- Overall: 618–547–4
- Tournaments: NCAA: 3–4; Big East: 15–22

Accomplishments and honors

Championships
- 2x Big East Tournament: 2001, 2011

Awards
- ABCA East Region Coach of the Year: 2011; 2x NJCBA Coach of the Year: 2001, 2013; Big East Coach of the Year (2023)

Rob Sheppard is an American college baseball coach who has been the head coach at Seton Hall since the start of the 2004 season. Sheppard was also the Pirates' interim head coach in 2001. He succeeded his father, Mike, who had been Seton Hall's head coach since 1973. Under Sheppard, the Pirates have appeared in two NCAA tournaments.

== Playing career ==
Sheppard, a Seton Hall alumnus, played baseball at the school from 1989–1992. He captained the team his senior season, and the Pirates appeared in the Big East tournament in each of his four seasons. He was a career .278 hitter for the Pirates.

== Coaching career ==
After graduating in 1992, Sheppard spent two years coaching American Legion and high school baseball before joining his father's staff at Seton Hall as an assistant in 1995. He held this position for six seasons.

In 2001, Sheppard served as interim head coach while his father missed the season due to heart surgery. The Pirates went 14–11–1 in conference play to tie for third in the Big East, then went 4–0 at the Big East tournament, defeating Virginia Tech in the championship game to earn the program's second straight NCAA tournament berth. At the Clemson Regional, the Pirates went 2–2, beating top-seeded South Alabama twice and losing to Clemson in the regional final. Future Manhattan and Fordham head coach Kevin Leighton played for Sheppard on the 2001 team.

Mike Sheppard returned from 2002–2003, during which time Rob served as associate head coach. His father resigned after the 2003 season, and Rob served as interim head coach in 2004 before being named to the position permanently ahead of the 2005 season.

Between 2004–2010, Seton Hall had only two winning seasons (2008 and 2009) and made only one Big East Tournament appearance (2008). In 2011, however, the Pirates returned to the NCAA tournament. They went 4–0 at the Big East tournament, defeating St. John's in the championship game to earn the conference's automatic bid to the NCAA tournament. There, they went 1–2 at the College Station Regional.

From 2011–2014, Seton Hall had four straight 30-win seasons, including a high of 39 in 2014, its first year in the new Big East Conference.

== Head coaching record ==
Below is a table of Sheppard's records as a collegiate head baseball coach.

Record table
Season	Team	Overall	Conference	Standing	Postseason
Seton Hall Pirates (Big East Conference) (2001)
2001	Seton Hall	34–23–1	14–11–1	T-3rd	NCAA Regional
Seton Hall Pirates (Big East Conference) (2004–2013)
2004	Seton Hall	17–33–1	9–17	T-9th	
2005	Seton Hall	17–35	8–17	9th	
2006	Seton Hall	17–34	7–20	12th	
2007	Seton Hall	25–25	9–15	11th	
2008	Seton Hall	31–25	15–12	5th	Big East tournament
2009	Seton Hall	25–24	13–14	T-8th	
2010	Seton Hall	19–30–1	8–19	11th	
2011	Seton Hall	34–25	14–13	T-4th	NCAA Regional
2012	Seton Hall	34–24	17–10	T-3rd	Big East tournament
2013	Seton Hall	37–19	18–6	T-2nd	Big East tournament
Seton Hall Pirates (Big East Conference) (2014–present)
2014	Seton Hall	39–15	11–7	3rd	Big East tournament
2015	Seton Hall	25–25	9–9	3rd	Big East tournament
2016	Seton Hall	38–20	10–8	3rd	Big East tournament
2017	Seton Hall	29–24	10–8	4th	Big East tournament
2018	Seton Hall	30–20–1	13–4	2nd	Big East tournament
2019	Seton Hall	25–28	9–9	T-3rd	Big East tournament
2020	Seton Hall	6–8	0–0		Season canceled due to COVID-19
2022	Seton Hall	18–35	7–13	7th	
2023	Seton Hall	31–24	13–8	3rd	Big East tournament
2024	Seton Hall	24–30	7–14	7th	
2025	Seton Hall	24–30	10–11	5th	
2026	Seton Hall	16–30	3–18	8th	
Seton Hall:		618–547–4	250–274		
Total:		618–547–4			
National champion Postseason invitational champion Conference regular season champion Conference regular season and conference tournament champion Division regular season champion Division regular season and conference tournament champion Conference tournament champion

== Personal ==
Sheppard is the brother-in-law of St. John's head coach Ed Blankmeyer, who is married to his sister, Susan.

== See also ==
- List of current NCAA Division I baseball coaches
- Seton Hall Pirates
