= 1991 Big East Conference baseball tournament =

American college baseball tournament

- Teams: 4
- Format: Double-elimination tournament
- Finals site: Muzzy Field; Bristol, Connecticut
- Champions: Villanova (2nd title)
- Winning coach: George Bennett (2nd title)
- MVP: Mike Neill (Villanova)

1991 Big East Conference baseball standings
	Conf.						Overall
Team	W		L		T	PCT	W		L		T	PCT
No. 30 St. John's ‍†‍‍^{y}	18	–	2	–	0	.900	34	–	14	–	1	.704
Villanova ‍‍‡‍^{y}	12	–	8	–	0	.600	37	–	15	–	1	.708
Providence ‍‍‍	12	–	8	–	0	.600	35	–	16	–	1	.683
Boston College ‍‍‍	12	–	9	–	0	.571	23	–	19	–	0	.548
Seton Hall ‍‍‍	10	–	9	–	0	.526	26	–	19	–	1	.576
Connecticut ‍‍‍	8	–	12	–	0	.400	16	–	25	–	1	.393
Pittsburgh ‍‍‍	4	–	15	–	0	.211	15	–	30	–	0	.333
Georgetown ‍‍‍	4	–	17	–	0	.190	10	–	32	–	0	.238
† – Conference champion ‡ – Tournament champion y – Invited to the NCAA tournament As of June 30, 1991; Rankings from Collegiate Baseball

The 1991 Big East Conference baseball tournament was held at Muzzy Field in Bristol, Connecticut. This was the seventh annual Big East Conference baseball tournament. The second seeded Villanova Wildcats won their second tournament championship and claimed the Big East Conference's automatic bid to the 1991 NCAA Division I baseball tournament.

== Format and seeding ==
The Big East baseball tournament was a 4 team double elimination tournament in 1991. The top four teams were seeded one through four based on conference winning percentage only.

Team	W	L	Pct.	GB	Seed
St. John's	18	2	.900	–	1
Villanova	15	6	.714	3.5	2
Providence	13	8	.619	5.5	3
Boston College	12	9	.571	6.5	4
Seton Hall	11	10	.524	7.5	–
Connecticut	8	13	.381	10.5	–
Pittsburgh	4	16	.200	15	–
Georgetown	4	17	.190	14.5	–

== Bracket ==
First round
1	St. John's	7
4	Boston College	1
2	Villanova	1
3	Providence	5
Lower round 1
4	Boston College	9
2	Villanova	10

Semi-finals
1	St. John's	8
3	Providence	4
Lower final
3	Providence	3
2	Villanova	6

Finals
1	St. John's	2	3
2	Villanova	6	12

== Jack Kaiser Award ==
Mike Neill was the winner of the 1991 Jack Kaiser Award. Neill was a center fielder for Villanova.
