= 2004 Big East Conference baseball tournament =

American college baseball tournament

- Teams: 4
- Format: Double-elimination tournament
- Finals site: Commerce Bank Ballpark; Bridgewater, New Jersey
- Champions: Notre Dame (3rd title)
- Winning coach: Paul Mainieri (3rd title)
- MVP: Matt Macri (Notre Dame)

2004 Big East Conference baseball standings
	Conf.						Overall
Team	W		L		T	PCT	W		L		T	PCT
No. 19 Notre Dame ‍†‍‡‍^{y}	20	–	6	–	0	.769	51	–	12	–	0	.810
St. John's ‍‍‍^{y}	17	–	9	–	0	.654	37	–	23	–	0	.617
Pittsburgh ‍‍‍	17	–	9	–	0	.654	38	–	18	–	0	.679
Boston College ‍‍‍	15	–	9	–	0	.625	32	–	27	–	0	.542
Rutgers ‍‍‍	13	–	11	–	0	.542	30	–	23	–	0	.566
Villanova ‍‍‍	11	–	14	–	0	.440	31	–	20	–	1	.606
Virginia Tech ‍‍‍	11	–	15	–	0	.423	29	–	27	–	0	.518
West Virginia ‍‍‍	10	–	16	–	0	.385	23	–	29	–	0	.442
Connecticut ‍‍‍	9	–	17	–	0	.346	26	–	29	–	1	.473
Seton Hall ‍‍‍	9	–	17	–	0	.346	17	–	33	–	1	.343
Georgetown ‍‍‍	8	–	17	–	0	.320	25	–	30	–	0	.455
† – Conference champion ‡ – Tournament champion y – Invited to the NCAA tournament As of June 30, 2004; Rankings from Collegiate Baseball

The 2004 Big East Conference baseball tournament was held at Commerce Bank Ballpark in Bridgewater, New Jersey. This was the twentieth annual Big East Conference baseball tournament. The Notre Dame Fighting Irish won their third tournament championship in a row and claimed the Big East Conference's automatic bid to the 2004 NCAA Division I baseball tournament. Notre Dame would go on to win five championships in a row.

== Format and seeding ==
The Big East baseball tournament was a 4 team double elimination tournament in 2004. The top four regular season finishers were seeded one through four based on conference winning percentage only.

Team	W	L	Pct.	GB	Seed
Notre Dame	20	6	.769	–	1
St. John's	17	9	.654	3	2
Pittsburgh	17	9	.654	3	3
Boston College	15	9	.625	4	4
Rutgers	13	11	.542	6	–
Villanova	11	14	.440	8.5	–
Virginia Tech	11	15	.423	9	–
West Virginia	10	16	.385	10	–
Connecticut	9	17	.346	11	–
Seton Hall	9	17	.346	11	–
Georgetown	8	17	.320	11.5	–

== Bracket ==
Upper round 1
1	Notre Dame	3
4	Boston College	2
2	St. John's	4
3	Pittsburgh	2
Lower round 1
4	Boston College	8
3	Pittsburgh	4

Upper final
1	Notre Dame	9
2	St. John's	2
Lower final
2	St. John's	4
4	Boston College	6

Final
1	Notre Dame
4	Boston College

== Jack Kaiser Award ==
Matt Macri was the winner of the 2004 Jack Kaiser Award. Macri was a junior third baseman for Notre Dame.
