= 1998 Big East Conference baseball tournament =

American college baseball tournament

- Teams: 6
- Format: Double-elimination tournament
- Finals site: Senator Thomas J. Dodd Memorial Stadium; Norwich, Connecticut
- Champions: Rutgers (1st title)
- Winning coach: Fred Hill (1st title)
- MVP: Dave Marciniak (Rutgers)

1998 Big East Conference baseball standings
	Conf.						Overall
Team	W		L		T	PCT	W		L		T	PCT
No. 30 Rutgers ‍†‍‡‍^{y}	17	–	3	–	0	.850	33	–	16	–	0	.673
Notre Dame ‍‍‍	15	–	4	–	0	.789	41	–	17	–	0	.707
St. John's ‍‍‍	14	–	7	–	0	.667	28	–	17	–	1	.620
Providence ‍‍‍	14	–	8	–	1	.630	31	–	22	–	1	.583
West Virginia ‍‍‍	13	–	9	–	0	.591	37	–	17	–	1	.682
Seton Hall ‍‍‍	12	–	10	–	0	.545	25	–	23	–	0	.521
Connecticut ‍‍‍	12	–	11	–	0	.522	25	–	17	–	0	.595
Villanova ‍‍‍	6	–	15	–	0	.286	26	–	21	–	1	.552
Pittsburgh ‍‍‍	5	–	16	–	0	.238	12	–	27	–	1	.313
Boston College ‍‍‍	4	–	15	–	1	.225	17	–	23	–	1	.427
Georgetown ‍‍‍	5	–	19	–	0	.208	22	–	34	–	0	.393
† – Conference champion ‡ – Tournament champion y – Invited to the NCAA tournament As of June 30, 1998; Rankings from Collegiate Baseball

The 1998 Big East Conference baseball tournament was held at Senator Thomas J. Dodd Memorial Stadium in Norwich, Connecticut. This was the fourteenth annual Big East Conference baseball tournament. The Rutgers Scarlet Knights won their first tournament championship and claimed the Big East Conference's automatic bid to the 1998 NCAA Division I baseball tournament. Rutgers joined the Big East prior to the 1996 season.

== Format and seeding ==
The Big East baseball tournament was a 6-team double-elimination tournament in 1998. The top six regular-season finishers were seeded one through six based on conference winning percentage only. The division used the previous two seasons was discontinued, with all 11 teams competing in a single division.

Team	W	L	T	Pct.	GB	Seed
Rutgers	17	3	0	.850	–	1
Notre Dame	15	4	0	.789	1.5	2
St. John's	14	7	0	.667	3.5	3
Providence	14	8	1	.630	5	4
West Virginia	13	9	0	.591	5	5
Seton Hall	12	10	0	.545	6	6
Connecticut	12	11	0	.522	6.5	–
Villanova	6	15	0	.286	10	–
Pittsburgh	5	16	0	.238	11	–
Boston College	4	15	1	.225	11.5	–
Georgetown	5	19	0	.208	14	–

== Bracket ==
First round
1	Rutgers	9*
6	Seton Hall	7*
2	Notre Dame	5
5	West Virginia	4
3	St. John's	7
4	Providence	2

Second round
1	Rutgers	2
4	Providence	3
5	West Virginia	7
6	Seton Hall	2
2	Notre Dame	3
3	St. John's	2
1	Rutgers	14
3	St. John's	10

Third round
4	Providence	10
5	West Virginia	1
2	Notre Dame	6
1	Rutgers	7

Semifinals
4	Providence	7
2	Notre Dame	9

Final
2	Notre Dame	0
1	Rutgers	12

* - Indicates game required 17 innings.

== Jack Kaiser Award ==
Dave Marciniak was the winner of the 1998 Jack Kaiser Award. Marciniak was a shortstop for Rutgers.

== Notes ==
- The Rutgers-Seton Hall 17-inning game was the longest in tournament history.
