= 1997 Big East Conference baseball tournament =

American college baseball tournament

- Teams: 6
- Format: Double-elimination tournament
- Finals site: Senator Thomas J. Dodd Memorial Stadium; Norwich, Connecticut
- Champions: St. John's (5th title)
- Winning coach: Ed Blankmeyer (1st title)
- MVP: Mike Dzurilla (St. John's)

1997 Big East Conference baseball standings
	Conf.						Overall
Team	W		L		T	PCT	W		L		T	PCT
American Division
West Virginia ^{x}‍‍‍	17	–	7	–	0	.708	36	–	19	–	0	.655
St. John's ‍‍‡‍^{y}	16	–	7	–	0	.696	35	–	17	–	0	.673
Connecticut ‍‍‍	11	–	13	–	0	.458	27	–	20	–	0	.574
Providence ‍‍‍	10	–	15	–	0	.400	26	–	23	–	1	.530
Boston College ‍‍‍	8	–	17	–	0	.320	20	–	23	–	0	.465
Pittsburgh ‍‍‍	8	–	17	–	0	.320	19	–	26	–	0	.422
National Division
Notre Dame ^{x}‍‍‍	15	–	6	–	0	.714	41	–	19	–	0	.683
Rutgers ‍‍‍	13	–	11	–	0	.542	28	–	24	–	0	.538
Seton Hall ‍‍‍	13	–	11	–	0	.542	32	–	22	–	0	.593
Villanova ‍‍‍	12	–	12	–	0	.500	29	–	27	–	0	.518
Georgetown ‍‍‍	8	–	15	–	0	.348	19	–	37	–	1	.342
x – Division champion † – Conference champion ‡ – Tournament champion y – Invited to the NCAA tournament As of June 30, 1997; Rankings from Collegiate Baseball

The 1997 Big East Conference baseball tournament was held at Senator Thomas J. Dodd Memorial Stadium in Norwich, Connecticut. This was the thirteenth annual Big East Conference baseball tournament. The St. John's Red Storm won their fifth tournament championship and claimed the Big East Conference's automatic bid to the 1997 NCAA Division I baseball tournament.

== Format and seeding ==
The Big East baseball tournament was a 6 team double elimination tournament in 1997. The top six regular season finishers were seeded one through six based on conference winning percentage only, regardless of division.

Team	W	L	Pct.	GB	Seed
American Division
West Virginia	17	7	.708	–	2
St. John's	16	7	.696	.5	3
Connecticut	11	13	.458	6	–
Providence	10	15	.400	7.5	–
Boston College	8	17	.320	9.5	–
Pittsburgh	8	17	.320	8.5	–
National Division
Notre Dame	15	6	.714	–	1
Rutgers	13	11	.542	3.5	4
Seton Hall	13	11	.542	3.5	5
Villanova	12	12	.500	5.5	6
Georgetown	8	15	.348	8	–

== Bracket ==
First round
1	Notre Dame	5
6	Villanova	10
2	West Virginia	6
5	Seton Hall	4
3	St. John's	3
4	Rutgers	0

Second round
4	Rutgers	5
6	Villanova	12
2	West Virginia	4
3	St. John's	11
1	Notre Dame	4
5	Seton Hall	3

Third round
6	Villanova	5
3	St. John's	6
1	West Virginia	1
1	Notre Dame	8

Semifinals
6	Villanova	5*
1	Notre Dame	4*

Final
3	St. John's	9	—
6	Villanova	7	—

* - Indicates game required 11 innings.

== Jack Kaiser Award ==
Mike Dzurilla was the winner of the 1997 Jack Kaiser Award. Dzurilla was a third baseman for St. John's.
