= Fred Hill (coach) =

American football and baseball coach (1934–2019)

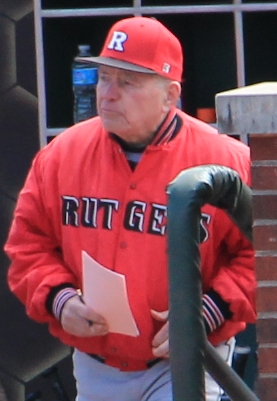
- Hill in 2013

Biographical details
- Born: July 15, 1934
- Died: March 2, 2019 (aged 84)

Playing career

Football
- 1953–1956: Upsala

Basketball
- 1953–1957: Upsala

Baseball
- 1954–1957: Upsala

Coaching career (HC unless noted)

Football
- 1959–1965: Clifford Scott HS (NJ) (assistant)
- 1966–1969: Clifford Scott HS (NJ)
- 1970–1975: Pequannock Township HS (NJ)
- 1976–1982: Montclair State

Baseball
- 1966–1970: Clifford Scott HS (NJ)
- 1977–1983: Montclair State
- 1984–2013: Rutgers
- 2015–2016: Caldwell (assistant)
- 2017–2019: Kean (assistant)

Head coaching record
- Overall: 52–16–4 (college football); 1,089–749–9 (college baseball); 57–30–3 (high school football)
- Tournaments: Football; 1–1 (NCAA D-III playoffs) Baseball; 9–16 (NCAA Division I)

Accomplishments and honors

Championships
- Football; 4 NJSAC (1978–1979, 1981–1982) Baseball; 3 NJSAC; 5 A-10 tournament 8 A-10 regular season 4 Big East regular season 3 Big East tournament

Awards
- Baseball; 3× ABCA East Region Coach of the Year; 1998 Big East Coach of the Year; 3× A-10 Coach of the Year; 1983 NCAA Division III Coach of the Year

Fred Hill Sr. (July 15, 1934 – March 2, 2019) was an American football and baseball coach. He served as the head baseball coach at Rutgers University in New Brunswick, New Jersey, where he served from 1984 through 2013. His teams earned 13 NCAA Division I baseball tournament bids at the school. Hill was also a head baseball and football coach for the Montclair State University Red Hawks in Upper Montclair, New Jersey. He compiled an overall college baseball coaching record of 1,089–749–9.

== Coaching career ==
=== Montclair State ===
In seven seasons as football head coach he compiled a record of 52–16–4, including four New Jersey State Athletic Conference titles. He also led them to the school's first 10-win season in 1981. As the Red Hawks' baseball coach, Hill went 148–91–1 in seven seasons. For his highly successful coaching efforts he was inducted into the Montclair State University Hall of Fame. His jersey number was also just the third to ever be retired at MSU, joining Sam Mills and Carol Blazejowski.

=== Rutgers ===
Hill served as the Rutgers Scarlet Knights head baseball coach, a position that he held from the 1984 through 2013 seasons. He recorded a record of 941–658–7 at Rutgers alone and sent 72 different players in 30 years to professional baseball careers. When Hill announced his retirement prior to the start of the 2014 NCAA baseball season, his 1,089 career wins ranked him 11th in college baseball history. He was named the A-10 Coach of the Year three times and Big East Coach of the Year once.

=== Caldwell ===
Hill was hired as an assistant coach of the Caldwell University Cougars baseball program in 2015, a position he stayed in for two seasons.

=== Kean ===
In 2017, Hill joined Kean University's baseball staff as an assistant coach.

== Personal life ==
Hill's son, Fred Hill, was the Scarlet Knights men's basketball head coach. His brother is Brian Hill, a former assistant coach with the NBA's Detroit Pistons. He resided in Verona with his wife Evelyn of more than 50 years. He had 6 children (Nancy, Linda, Tracey, Karen, Jimmy and, Fred); Hill also had 12 grandchildren (Jessica, Danielle, Steven, Brian, James, Natalie, Andrew, Caroline, Nicholas, Alexandra, Giselle, and Giancarlo). Fred Hill, Sr. attended Clifford Scott High School in East Orange, NJ. He also attended Upsala College and graduated in 1957. Fred Hill, Jr. attended Verona High School. Hill died on March 2 at the age of 84.

== Head coaching record ==
=== College football ===
Year	Team	Overall	Conference	Standing	Bowl/playoffs
Montclair State Indians (New Jersey State Athletic Conference) (1976–1982)
1976	Montclair State	4–5–1	4–1	2nd	
1977	Montclair State	6–4	3–2	3rd	
1978	Montclair State	8–2	5–0	1st	
1979	Montclair State	8–1–1	4–0–1	1st	
1980	Montclair State	8–2	5–1	2nd	
1981	Montclair State	10–2	6–0	1st	L NCAA Division III Semifinal
1982	Montclair State	8–0–2	6–0	1st	
Montclair State:		52–16–4			
Total:		52–16–4			
National championship Conference title Conference division title or championship game berth

=== College baseball ===
Below is a table of Hill's yearly records as an NCAA head baseball coach.

Record table
Season	Team	Overall	Conference	Standing	Postseason
Montclair State Indians (New Jersey Athletic Conference) (1977–1983)
1977	Montclair State	17–12	9–3		
1978	Montclair State	21–12	8–1		NCAA Regional
1979	Montclair State	17–15	8–2		
1980	Montclair State	19–14	9–6		
1981	Montclair State	18–10	6–4		
1982	Montclair State	25–14–1	8–2		NCAA Regional
1983	Montclair State	31–14–1	10–2		College World Series
Montclair State:		148–91–2	58–20		
Rutgers Scarlet Knights (Atlantic 10 Conference) (1984–1991)
1984	Rutgers	13–21	4–7	4th (East)	
1985	Rutgers	25–15	6–6	3rd (East)	
1986	Rutgers	28–18	9–2	1st (East)	NCAA Regional
1987	Rutgers	36–14–1	11–4–1	1st (East)	A–10 Tournament
1988	Rutgers	38–21–1	14–2	1st (East)	NCAA Regional
1989	Rutgers	34–18	14–2	1st (East)	A–10 tournament
1990	Rutgers	37–19	14–2	1st (East)	NCAA Regional
1991	Rutgers	33–24–2	11–5	1st (East)	NCAA Regional
1992	Rutgers	32–17	14–2	1st (East)	A–10 tournament
1993	Rutgers	38–17	14–6	1st	NCAA Regional
1994	Rutgers	28–19	15–4	3rd	A–10 tournament
1995	Rutgers	28–29	13–11	4th	A–10 tournament
Rutgers Scarlet Knights (Big East Conference) (1996–present)
1996	Rutgers	32–21–1	15–7–1	2nd (National)	Big East tournament
1997	Rutgers	28–24	13–11	2nd (National)	Big East tournament
1998	Rutgers	33–16	17–3	1st	NCAA Regional
1999	Rutgers	37–21	19–7	2nd	Big East tournament
2000	Rutgers	40–18	18–5	1st	NCAA Regional
2001	Rutgers	42–17	18–8	2nd	Big East tournament
2002	Rutgers	35–22	15–11	T–3rd	Big East tournament
2003	Rutgers	37–22	19–6	1st	Big East tournament
2004	Rutgers	30–23	13–11	5th	
2005	Rutgers	32–21	12–12	5th	
2006	Rutgers	29–28–1	13–14	6th	Big East tournament
2007	Rutgers	42–21	20–7	T–1st	NCAA Regional
2008	Rutgers	23–29	11–16	T–9th	
2009	Rutgers	22–31	8–19	11th	
2010	Rutgers	30–26	15–12	6th	Big East tournament
2011	Rutgers	20–30	11–16	11th	
2012	Rutgers	31–25	16–11	5th	Big East tournament
2013	Rutgers	28–30	14–10	5th	Big East tournament
Rutgers:		941–658–7	406–239–2		
Total:		1089–749–9			
National champion Postseason invitational champion Conference regular season champion Conference regular season and conference tournament champion Division regular season champion Division regular season and conference tournament champion Conference tournament champion
