= 2005 Big East Conference baseball tournament =

American college baseball tournament

- Teams: 4
- Format: Double-elimination tournament
- Finals site: Commerce Bank Ballpark; Bridgewater, New Jersey
- Champions: Notre Dame (4th title)
- Winning coach: Paul Mainieri (4th title)
- MVP: Matt Edwards (Notre Dame)

2005 Big East Conference baseball standings
	Conf.						Overall
Team	W		L		T	PCT	W		L		T	PCT
No. 30 St. John's ‍†‍‍^{y}	19	–	4	–	0	.826	41	–	18	–	0	.695
Boston College ‍‍‍	17	–	8	–	0	.680	37	–	20	–	0	.649
Notre Dame ‍‍‡‍^{y}	14	–	9	–	1	.604	38	–	24	–	1	.611
Pittsburgh ‍‍‍	15	–	10	–	0	.600	33	–	22	–	0	.600
Rutgers ‍‍‍	12	–	12	–	0	.500	32	–	21	–	0	.604
Connecticut ‍‍‍	11	–	12	–	0	.478	24	–	22	–	0	.522
West Virginia ‍‍‍	10	–	15	–	0	.400	25	–	30	–	0	.455
Villanova ‍‍‍	8	–	16	–	1	.340	28	–	21	–	2	.569
Seton Hall ‍‍‍	8	–	17	–	0	.320	17	–	35	–	0	.327
Georgetown ‍‍‍	7	–	18	–	0	.280	25	–	31	–	0	.446
† – Conference champion ‡ – Tournament champion y – Invited to the NCAA tournament As of June 30, 2005; Rankings from Collegiate Baseball

The 2005 Big East Conference baseball tournament was held at Commerce Bank Ballpark in Bridgewater, New Jersey. This was the twenty first annual Big East Conference baseball tournament and last to be held at Commerce Bank Ballpark. The Notre Dame Fighting Irish won their fourth tournament championship in a row and claimed the Big East Conference's automatic bid to the 2005 NCAA Division I baseball tournament. Notre Dame would go on to win five championships in a row.

== Format and seeding ==
The Big East baseball tournament was a 4 team double elimination tournament in 2005. The top four regular season finishers were seeded one through four based on conference winning percentage only.

Team	W	L	T	Pct.	GB	Seed
St. John's	19	4	0	.826	–	1
Boston College	17	8	0	.680	3	2
Notre Dame	14	9	1	.604	5	3
Pittsburgh	15	10	0	.600	5	4
Rutgers	12	12	0	.500	7.5	–
Connecticut	11	12	0	.478	8	–
West Virginia	10	15	0	.400	10	–
Villanova	8	16	1	.340	11.5	–
Seton Hall	8	17	0	.320	12	–
Georgetown	7	18	0	.280	13	–

== Tournament ==
Upper round 1
1	St. John's	1
4	Pittsburgh	4
2	Boston College	5
3	Notre Dame	6
Lower round 1
1	St. John's	5
2	Boston College	7

Upper final
4	Pittsburgh	2
3	Notre Dame	4
Lower final
4	Pittsburgh	3*
2	Boston College	2*

Final
3	Notre Dame	11	—
4	Pittsburgh	4	—

== Jack Kaiser Award ==
Matt Edwards was the winner of the 2005 Jack Kaiser Award. Edwards was a senior first baseman for the Notre Dame Fighting Irish.
