= Joe Jordano =

Current position
- Title: College Placement Coordinator
- Team: IMG Academy

Biographical details
- Born: Erie, Pennsylvania, U.S.
- Education: Westminster '85

Playing career
- 1982–1985: Westminster

Coaching career (HC unless noted)
- 1988–1997: Mercyhurst
- 1998–2018: Pittsburgh
- 2019–present: IMG Academy

Head coaching record
- Overall: 871–638–2
- Tournaments: ACC: 2–1; NCAA:0–0

Accomplishments and honors

Championships
- 1996, 1997 GLIAC Champions

Awards
- 2× GLIAC Coach of the Year (1996, 1997); 2× Big East Coach of the Year (2004, 2013); ABCA East Region Coach of the Year (2013)

Joe Jordano is an American college baseball coach and former collegiate baseball player. He most recently served as head coach of the Pittsburgh Panthers baseball team. He held that position from 1998 season to 2018. Prior to his tenure at Pitt, Jordano was the head coach at Mercyhurst College. Jordano led the Lakers to unprecedented success and left as the winningest coach in Laker history. Upon his departure from Pitt, Jordano earned more wins (588) than any coach, in any sport in Pitt history. His teams re-wrote the Panther Baseball Record Books and had over 70 players go on to play professional baseball. Currently, Jordano is the College Placement Coordinator at the world-renowned IMG Academy in Bradenton, Florida.

== Playing career ==
Jordano was a standout four year letterman and all-district at Westminster College, graduating with a degree in Speech/Communications in 1985.

== Coaching career ==
NCAA Division II member Mercyhurst hired Jordano as head coach beginning in the 1988 season, with the new coach inheriting a team that mustered just nine wins the previous year. Jordano led the Lakers to a 19–17 record in his first season, and his teams were .500 or better each of his ten seasons. The Lakers made five trips to the NCAA Division II Baseball Championship and claimed a pair of Great Lakes Intercollegiate Athletic Conference championships in amassing 283 wins against 118 losses under Jordano. At the time, Jordano was the Mercyhurst all-time leader in wins. While coaching the Lakers, Jordano earned a master's in Athletic Administration from Slippery Rock University.

Following four straight NCAA regional appearances at Mercyhurst, Jordano became head coach at Pitt. Inheriting a rebuilding project in the Big East Conference that was growing stronger as it expanded, Jordano's tenure with the Panthers delivered results including national rankings, seven thirty win seasons, two Big East Coach of the Year awards. Jordano led the Panthers in the transition into the powerful Atlantic Coast Conference beginning in 2014. On March 2, 2011, Jordano won his 403rd game at Pitt to become the school's all-time leader in wins with a 3–1 victory over Coastal Carolina. The next season, Jordano claimed his 700th overall win with a 3–2 defeat of Akron. On February 28, 2016, Jordano earned his 800th NCAA Collegiate win with a 18–5 victory over Grambling State. Coach Jordano hit another milestone with a 9–1 victory over UMass on March 3, 2018 notching his 850th win. Despite scholarship and roster limits while at Pitt, Jordano, his staff and teams built a very respectable program over his twenty one years as skipper.

Jordano resigned as the head coach of Pittsburgh on June 22, 2018.

== Head coaching record ==
The following list Jordano's record as a head coach.

Record table
| Season | Team | Overall | Conference | Standing | Postseason |
|---|---|---|---|---|---|
Mercyhurst Lakers (Great Lakes (Division II)) (1988–1997)
| 1988 | Mercyhurst | 19–17 | Independent | | |
| 1989 | Mercyhurst | 23–10 | Independent | | ECAC Tournament |
| 1990 | Mercyhurst | 28–13 | Independent | | |
| 1991 | Mercyhurst | 28–15 | Independent | | NCAA Regional |
| 1992 | Mercyhurst | 18–18 | Independent | | |
| 1993 | Mercyhurst | 29–15 | Independent | | |
| 1994 | Mercyhurst | 30–8 | Independent | | NCAA Regional |
| 1995 | Mercyhurst | 31–7 | Independent | | NCAA Regional |
| 1996 | Mercyhurst | 37–8 | GLIAC | 1st | NCAA Regional |
| 1997 | Mercyhurst | 40–8 | GLIAC | 1st | NCAA Regional |
| Mercyhurst: | | 283–118 | | | |
Pittsburgh Panthers (Big East Conference) (1998–2013)
| 1998 | Pittsburgh | 12–27–1 | 5–16 | 9th | |
| 1999 | Pittsburgh | 27–27 | 11–15 | 8th | |
| 2000 | Pittsburgh | 31–24 | 11–13 | 6th | Big East Tournament (Note: 6 of the Big East's 10 teams qualified for the tournament) |
| 2001 | Pittsburgh | 18–27 | 6–18 | 11th | |
| 2002 | Pittsburgh | 36–16–1 | 14–11 | 5th | |
| 2003 | Pittsburgh | 36–20 | 13–13 | 6th | |
| 2004 | Pittsburgh | 38–18 | 17–9 | 3rd | Big East Tournament (Note: 4 of the Big East's 11 teams qualified for the tournament) |
| 2005 | Pittsburgh | 33–22 | 15–10 | 4th | Big East Tournament (Note: 4 of the Big East's 11 teams qualified for the tournament) |
| 2006 | Pittsburgh | 23–29 | 10–17 | 9th | |
| 2007 | Pittsburgh | 27–27 | 15–11 | 4th | Big East Tournament (Note: 8 of the Big East's 12 teams qualified for the tournament) |
| 2008 | Pittsburgh | 19–34 | 7–19 | 11th | |
| 2009 | Pittsburgh | 28–21 | 13–13 | 7th | Big East Tournament (Note: 8 of the Big East's 12 teams qualified for the tournament) |
| 2010 | Pittsburgh | 38–18 | 18–8 | 3rd | Big East Tournament (Note: 8 of the Big East's 12 teams qualified for the tournament) |
| 2011 | Pittsburgh | 33–23 | 16–11 | 3rd | Big East Tournament (Note: 8 of the Big East's 12 teams qualified for the tournament) |
| 2012 | Pittsburgh | 28–28 | 10–17 | 8th | Big East Tournament (Note: 8 of the Big East's 12 teams qualified for the tournament) |
| 2013 | Pittsburgh | 42-17 | 18-6 | t-2nd | Big East Tournament |
Pittsburgh Panthers (Atlantic Coast Conference) (2014–2018)
| 2014 | Pittsburgh | 22-30 | 11-19 | 6th (Coastal) | |
| 2015 | Pittsburgh | 20-32 | 9-21 | 7th (Coastal) | |
| 2016 | Pittsburgh | 25-26 | 10-18 | 6th (Coastal) | |
| 2017 | Pittsburgh | 23-30 | 9-21 | 6th (Coastal) | |
| 2018 | Pittsburgh | 29-26 | 11-19 | 6th (Coastal) | ACC Tournament |
| Pittsburgh: | | 588–520–2 | 247–305 | | |
| Total: | | 871–638–2 | | | |
National champion Postseason invitational champion Conference regular season champion Conference regular season and conference tournament champion Division regular season champion Division regular season and conference tournament champion Conference tournament champion
