= 2003 Big East Conference baseball tournament =

American college baseball tournament

- Teams: 4
- Format: Double-elimination tournament
- Finals site: Commerce Bank Ballpark; Bridgewater, New Jersey
- Champions: Notre Dame (2nd title)
- Winning coach: Paul Mainieri (2nd title)
- MVP: Javi Sanchez (Notre Dame)

2003 Big East Conference baseball standings
	Conf.				Overall
Team	W		L	PCT	W		L	PCT
Rutgers ‍†‍‍^{y}	19	–	6	.760	37	–	22	.627
West Virginia ‍‍‍	18	–	6	.750	36	–	19	.655
No. 28 Notre Dame ‍‍‡‍^{y}	16	–	7	.696	45	–	18	.714
Virginia Tech ‍‍‍	15	–	10	.600	34	–	23	.596
Boston College ‍‍‍	13	–	11	.542	33	–	21	.611
Pittsburgh ‍‍‍	13	–	13	.500	36	–	20	.643
St. John's ‍‍‍	12	–	14	.462	29	–	27	.518
Seton Hall ‍‍‍	11	–	14	.440	23	–	24	.489
Connecticut ‍‍‍	10	–	15	.400	24	–	23	.511
Villanova ‍‍‍	6	–	19	.240	14	–	32	.304
Georgetown ‍‍‍	4	–	22	.154	14	–	33	.298
† – Conference champion ‡ – Tournament champion y – Invited to the NCAA tournament As of June 30, 2003; Rankings from Collegiate Baseball

The 2003 Big East Conference baseball tournament was held at Commerce Bank Ballpark in Bridgewater, New Jersey. This was the nineteenth annual Big East Conference baseball tournament. The Notre Dame Fighting Irish won their second tournament championship in a row and claimed the Big East Conference's automatic bid to the 2003 NCAA Division I baseball tournament. Notre Dame would go on to win five championships in a row.

== Format and seeding ==
The Big East baseball tournament was a 4 team double elimination tournament in 2003. The top four regular season finishers were seeded one through four based on conference winning percentage only.

Team	W	L	Pct.	GB	Seed
Rutgers	19	6	.760	–	1
West Virginia	18	6	.750	.5	2
Notre Dame	16	7	.696	2	3
Virginia Tech	15	10	.600	4	4
Boston College	13	11	.542	5.5	–
Pittsburgh	13	13	.500	5.5	–
St. John's	12	14	.462	7.5	–
Seton Hall	11	14	.440	8	–
Connecticut	10	15	.400	9	–
Villanova	6	19	.240	13	–
Georgetown	4	22	.154	15.5	–

== Bracket ==
Upper round 1
1	Rutgers	6
4	Virginia Tech	0
2	West Virginia	1
3	Notre Dame	9
Lower round 1
4	Virginia Tech	0
2	West Virginia	10

Upper final
1	Rutgers	3
3	Notre Dame	9
Lower final
1	Rutgers	8
2	West Virginia	7

Final
3	Notre Dame
1	Rutgers

== Jack Kaiser Award ==
Javi Sanchez was the winner of the 2003 Jack Kaiser Award. Sanchez was a junior catcher for Notre Dame.
