= Ed Servais =

American college baseball coach (born 1958)

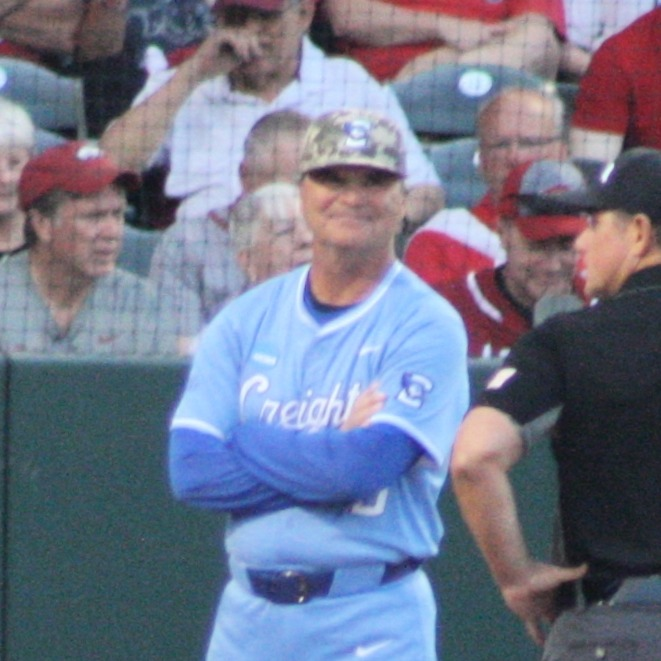
- Servais in June 2025, before his final game at Creighton

Biographical details
- Born: c. 1958

Playing career
- 1978–1981: Wisconsin–La Crosse

Coaching career (HC unless noted)
- 1984–1986: Saint Mary's (MN) (assistant)
- 1988: Viterbo
- 1989–1995: Saint Mary's (MN)
- 1996–1997: Iowa State (assistant)
- 1998–2003: Creighton (assistant)
- 2004–2025: Creighton

Head coaching record
- Overall: 880–497–1 (NCAA); 23–6 (NAIA)
- Tournaments: 11–12 (NCAA); 15–11 (Big East); 25–12 (MVC)

Accomplishments and honors

Championships
- 2 MIAC regular season (1990, 1993); 2 MVC regular season (2005, 2011); 3 MVC tournament (2007, 2011, 2012); 4 Big East regular season (2014, 2017, 2019, 2025); 2 Big East tournament (2019, 2025)

Awards
- 2× MIAC Coach of the Year (1990, 1993); 4× MVC Coach of the Year (2004, 2005, 2007, 2011); 2× Big East Coach of the Year (2014, 2019)

Ed Servais (born c. 1958) is a retired American college baseball coach who was most recently the head coach at Creighton University, a member of the Big East Conference in NCAA Division I. He held the position from July 2003 until June 2025, and led the Bluejays to four appearances in the NCAA tournament.

== Coaching career ==
=== Division III and NAIA ===
Servais' first college coaching position was with Saint Mary's in Winona, Minnesota, an NCAA Division III program where he was an assistant from 1984 to 1986. Following the 1986 season, he was hired by NAIA member Viterbo to start the school's baseball program. The team went 23–6 in 1988, its first season.

Following one season at Viterbo, Servais was rehired by Saint Mary's as head coach. He held the position for seven seasons (1989–1995) and had an overall record of 159–76–1 (.676). Saint Mary's qualified for the 1993 Division III tournament, and were runner-up in the Midwest Regional. In both 1990 and 1993, Servais was named the Minnesota Intercollegiate Athletic Conference Coach of the Year.

=== Division I assistant ===
Prior to the start of the 1996 season, Servais was hired as an assistant coach at Iowa State of the Big 12 Conference, his first Division I coaching position. He served as an assistant to head coach Lyle Smith for two seasons (1996–1997).

From 1998–2003, Servais was an assistant and infield coach at Creighton under head coach Jack Dahm. While he was an assistant, Creighton appeared in two NCAA tournaments (1999 and 2000).

=== Creighton ===
==== Missouri Valley Conference ====
After a 20–37 season in 2003, Dahm resigned as Creighton's head coach in late June. Servais was named interim head coach and later hired as the program's head coach on July 29.

In Servais' first season in 2004, Creighton went 35–24 and finished second in the Missouri Valley Conference (MVC), after finishing fifth the previous season. Servais was named the MVC Coach of the Year and became the first first-year coach to receive the award. In 2005, the team went 48–17 and won the MVC regular season championship. After losing the MVC Tournament championship game to Wichita State, Creighton received an at-large bid to the NCAA tournament. In the tournament, the team went 2–2 and lost in the Lincoln Regional final to Nebraska. Servais was again named MVC Coach of the Year.

Creighton finished fourth in the MVC in 2006, but qualified for a second NCAA tournament under Servais in 2007. It received the MVC's automatic bid to the tournament by defeating Wichita State in the MVC championship game, 10–9 in 12 innings. As the second seed in the Fayetteville Regional, it went 1–2. Servais was named the MVC Coach of the Year.

The program's win totals declined from 2007–2010. After finishing second in the MVC in 2007, it finished third in 2008, fourth in 2009, and sixth in 2010. In 2011 and 2012, however, Creighton appeared in consecutive NCAA tournaments. In 2011, the team won both the MVC regular season and tournament titles and was named the second seed in the Corvallis Regional. It defeated Georgia, 2–1, in its opening game, but lost consecutive games to Oregon State and Georgia and was eliminated. For the season, Servais received his fourth MVC Coach of the Year award. In 2012, the Bluejays finished last in the MVC, but won the conference tournament to qualify for the NCAA tournament. As the fourth seed in the Los Angeles Regional, Creighton lost to UCLA in the regional final.

In 2013, Creighton's final season in the MVC, the team finished third in the conference.

==== Big East Conference ====
Creighton joined the new Big East Conference ahead of the 2014 season. The Bluejays won the inaugural regular season title, then lost to Xavier in the tournament championship game. Servais was named the Big East Coach of the Year. In May 2024, Servais announced that 2025 would be his final season as coach of the Bluejays; in June 2024, former University of South Carolina baseball coach Mark Kingston was hired as associate head coach/head coach in waiting.

== Personal life ==
Servais is the uncle of former Seattle Mariners manager Scott Servais (b.1967), a former major league catcher who played at Creighton in the late 1980s.

== Head coaching record ==
The following is a table of Servais' yearly records as an NAIA and NCAA head baseball coach.

Record table
Season	Team	Overall	Conference	Standing	Postseason
Viterbo V-Hawks (Midwest Collegiate Conference) (1988)
1988	Viterbo	23–6	11–1		
Viterbo (NAIA):		23–6	11–1		
Saint Mary's Cardinals (Minnesota Intercollegiate Athletic Conference) (1989–1995)
1989	Saint Mary's	13–22–1	9–11		
1990	Saint Mary's	28–8	14–6	1st	
1991	Saint Mary's	20–10	14–6		
1992	Saint Mary's	28–7	11–7		
1993	Saint Mary's	26–7	16–3	1st	NCAA Regional
1994	Saint Mary's	20–11	14–6		
1995	Saint Mary's	24–11	12–8		
Saint Mary's:		159–76–1	90–47		
Creighton Bluejays (Missouri Valley Conference) (2004–2013)
2004	Creighton	35–24	22–9	2nd	MVC Tournament
2005	Creighton	48–17	17–7	1st	NCAA Regional
2006	Creighton	31–21	13–11	4th	MVC Tournament
2007	Creighton	45–16	19–5	2nd	NCAA Regional
2008	Creighton	37–21	16–8	3rd	MVC Tournament
2009	Creighton	31–25	14–9	4th	MVC Tournament
2010	Creighton	27–25	9–12	6th	MVC Tournament (Note: In this season, all members of the Missouri Valley Conference qualified for its postseason tournament.)
2011	Creighton	45–16	15–6	1st	NCAA Regional
2012	Creighton	28–30	6–14	8th	NCAA Regional
2013	Creighton	30–18	13–8	3rd	MVC tournament
Creighton Bluejays (Big East Conference) (2014–2025)
2014	Creighton	32–17	14–4	1st	Big East tournament
2015	Creighton	32–19	13–4	2nd	Big East tournament
2016	Creighton	38–17	13–5	2nd	Big East tournament
2017	Creighton	24–25	11–4	1st	Big East tournament
2018	Creighton	34–16	11–4	T-4th	
2019	Creighton	41–13	14–4	1st	NCAA Regional
2020	Creighton	5–10	0–0		Season canceled due to COVID-19
2021	Creighton	24–15	15–6	2nd	Big East tournament
2022	Creighton	31–18	15–5	2nd	Big East tournament
2023	Creighton	25–24	10–11	5th	
2024	Creighton	35–17	7–13	6th	
2025	Creighton	43–16	17–4	T–1st	NCAA Regional
Creighton:		721–421	140–64		
Total:		880–497–1			
National champion Postseason invitational champion Conference regular season champion Conference regular season and conference tournament champion Division regular season champion Division regular season and conference tournament champion Conference tournament champion

== See also ==
- List of current NCAA Division I baseball coaches
