= 1995 Big East Conference baseball tournament =

American college baseball tournament

- Teams: 4
- Format: Double-elimination tournament
- Finals site: Muzzy Field; Bristol, Connecticut
- Champions: Pittsburgh (1st title)
- Winning coach: Mark Jackson (1st title)
- MVP: Jon DeBernardis (Pittsburgh)

1995 Big East Conference baseball standings
	Conf.						Overall
Team	W		L		T	PCT	W		L		T	PCT
Providence ‍†‍‍	16	–	5	–	0	.762	44	–	15	–	0	.746
Seton Hall ‍‍‍	14	–	7	–	0	.667	38	–	16	–	0	.704
Villanova ‍‍‍	14	–	7	–	0	.667	40	–	16	–	0	.714
Pittsburgh ‍‍‡‍^{y}	12	–	9	–	0	.571	39	–	16	–	0	.709
St. John's ‍‍‍	12	–	9	–	0	.571	18	–	16	–	0	.529
Boston College ‍‍‍	8	–	13	–	0	.381	21	–	24	–	0	.467
Georgetown ‍‍‍	4	–	17	–	0	.190	17	–	34	–	0	.333
Connecticut ‍‍‍	4	–	17	–	0	.190	13	–	30	–	1	.307
† – Conference champion ‡ – Tournament champion y – Invited to the NCAA tournament As of June 30, 1995; Rankings from Collegiate Baseball

The 1995 Big East Conference baseball tournament was held at Muzzy Field in Bristol, Connecticut. This was the eleventh annual Big East Conference baseball tournament. The Pittsburgh Panthers won their first tournament championship and claimed the Big East Conference's automatic bid to the 1995 NCAA Division I baseball tournament.

== Format and seeding ==
The Big East baseball tournament was a 4 team double elimination tournament in 1995. The top four regular season finishers were seeded one through four based on conference winning percentage only. Pittsburgh claimed the fourth seed by winning the season series over St. John's.

Team	W	L	Pct.	GB	Seed
Providence	16	5	.762	–	1
Seton Hall	14	7	.667	2	2
Villanova	14	7	.667	2	3
Pittsburgh	12	9	.571	4	4
St. John's	12	9	.571	4	–
Boston College	8	13	.381	8	–
Georgetown	4	17	.190	13	–
Connecticut	4	17	.190	13	–

== Bracket ==
First round
1	Providence	2
4	Pittsburgh	6
2	Seton Hall	3
3	Villanova	2
Lower round 1
1	Providence	5
3	Villanova	0

Semi-finals
4	Pittsburgh	11
2	Seton Hall	10
Lower final
2	Seton Hall	0
1	Providence	6

Finals
4	Pittsburgh
1	Providence

== Jack Kaiser Award ==
Jon DeBernardis was the winner of the 1995 Jack Kaiser Award. DeBernardis was a third baseman for Pittsburgh.
