= 2010 Big East Conference baseball tournament =

American college baseball tournament

- Teams: 8
- Format: Double-elimination tournament
- Finals site: Bright House Field; Clearwater, FL
- Champions: St. John's (6th title)
- Winning coach: Ed Blankmeyer (2nd title)
- MVP: Kyle Hansen (St. John's)

2010 Big East Conference baseball standings
	Conf.						Overall
Team	W		L		T	PCT	W		L		T	PCT
Louisville ‍†‍‍	21	–	6	–	0	.778	50	–	14	–	0	.781
Connecticut ‍‍‍	20	–	6	–	0	.769	48	–	16	–	0	.750
Pittsburgh ‍‍‍	18	–	8	–	0	.692	38	–	18	–	0	.679
St. John's ‍‍‡‍	16	–	11	–	0	.593	43	–	20	–	0	.683
South Florida ‍‍‍	16	–	11	–	0	.593	26	–	32	–	0	.448
Rutgers ‍‍‍	15	–	12	–	0	.556	30	–	26	–	0	.536
Cincinnati ‍‍‍	13	–	14	–	0	.481	29	–	29	–	0	.500
West Virginia ‍‍‍	10	–	17	–	0	.370	27	–	30	–	0	.474
Notre Dame ‍‍‍	10	–	17	–	0	.370	22	–	32	–	0	.407
Villanova ‍‍‍	9	–	18	–	0	.333	29	–	23	–	0	.558
Seton Hall ‍‍‍	8	–	19	–	0	.296	19	–	30	–	1	.390
Georgetown ‍‍‍	5	–	22	–	0	.185	24	–	31	–	0	.436
† – Conference champion ‡ – Tournament champion As of June 8, 2010; Rankings from Collegiate Baseball

The 2010 Big East Conference baseball tournament was held from May 23 to May 27 at Bright House Field in Clearwater, Florida. It was an eight-team double elimination tournament. The winner, St. John's, received a bid to the 2010 NCAA Division I baseball tournament.

== Format and seeding ==
The top eight teams in the Big East were seeded one through eight based on their regular season finish, using conference winning percentage only.

Team	W	L	Pct.	GB	Seed
Louisville	21	6	.778	–	1
Connecticut	20	6	.769	.5	2
Pittsburgh	18	8	.692	2.5	3
St. John's	16	11	.593	5	4
South Florida	16	11	.593	5	5
Rutgers	15	12	.556	6	6
Cincinnati	13	14	.481	8	7
West Virginia	10	17	.370	11	8
Notre Dame	10	17	.370	11	–
Villanova	9	18	.333	12	–
Seton Hall	8	19	.296	13	–
Georgetown	5	22	.185	16	–

== Bracket ==
First round
1	Louisville	1
8	West Virginia	4
4	St. John's	3
5	South Florida	2
8	West Virginia	5
5	South Florida	10
3	Pittsburgh	5
6	Rutgers	9
2	Connecticut	9
7	Cincinnati	6
3	Pittsburgh	13
7	Cincinnati	4

Second round
1	Louisville	5
4	St. John's	6
1	Louisville	9
5	South Florida	7
6	Rutgers	6
2	Connecticut	5
2	Connecticut	7
3	Pittsburgh	2

Semifinals
4	St. John's	5
1	Louisville	3
6	Rutgers	10	4
2	Connecticut	11	7

Final
4	St. John's	3
2	Connecticut	0

== All-Tournament Team ==
The following players were named to the All-Tournament Team.

Pos	Name	Teama
P	Kyle Hansen	St. John's
P	Dan Feehan	Connecticut
C	Corey Brownsten	Pittsburgh
IF	Mike Nemeth	Connecticut
IF	Joe Panik	St. John's
IF	Steve Nyisztor	Rutgers
IF	Ryan Wright	Louisville
OF	George Springer	Connecticut
OF	Stewart Ijames	Louisville
OF	Billy Ferriter	Connecticut
DH	Kevan Smith	Pittsburgh

=== Jack Kaiser Award ===
Kyle Hansen was the winner of the 2010 Jack Kaiser Award. Hansen was a pitcher for St. John's.
