= Ed Blankmeyer =

American professional baseball coach and player

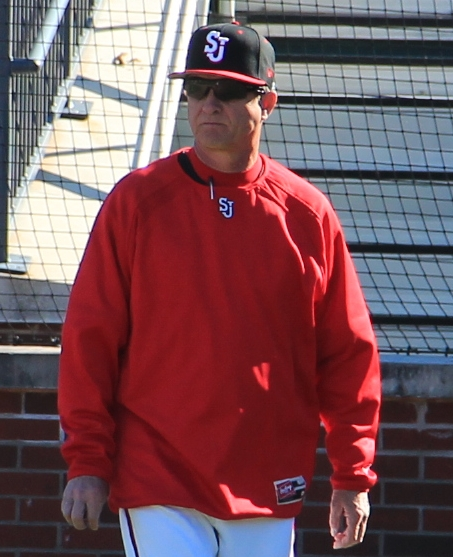
- Blankmeyer in 2013

Biographical details
- Born: December 15, 1954 (age 71)
- Education: Seton Hall University

Playing career
- 1973–1976: Seton Hall
- 1976: Pulaski Phillies
- Position: Second baseman

Coaching career (HC unless noted)
- 1980–1995: Seton Hall (Asst.)
- 1996–2019: St. John's
- 2020–2021: Brooklyn Cyclones

Head coaching record
- Overall: 829–499–4 (college)
- Tournaments: 13–18

Accomplishments and honors

Championships
- 6× Big East Regular season Championships (2005, 2007, 2008, 2012, 2015, 2018); 5× Big East Tournament championships (1997, 2010, 2012, 2015, 2018); 11× NCAA Regional Appearances (1997, 2004, 2005, 2007, 2008, 2010, 2011, 2012, 2015, 2017, 2018); 1 NCAA Super Regional Appearance (2012)

Awards
- 4× ABCA Northeast Region Coach of the Year (2004, 2005, 2007, 2008); 8× Big East Coach of the Year (1996, 2005, 2007, 2008, 2012, 2015, 2017, 2018)

Edward A. Blankmeyer (born December 15, 1954) is an American professional baseball coach and former second baseman. He was most recently the manager of the Brooklyn Cyclones of the New York–Penn League.

== Career ==
Blankmeyer played college baseball at Seton Hall University from 1973 to 1976. He served as an assistant coach at Seton Hall before serving as the head baseball coach at St. John's University from 1996 to 2019. Under Blankmeyer, St. John's won six Big East Conference Regular season Championships and five Big East Tournament championships. They appeared in ten NCAA Regionals and one NCAA Super Regional. Blankmeyer has received the Big East Conference's top coaching award eight times—six times as the head coach during the era in which the award was styled as "Coach of the Year" and presented solely to a head coach, and twice more under the award's current incarnation as the "Coaching Staff of the Year" award, presented to an entire staff. He has also received four ABCA Northeast Region Coach of the Year Awards.

On January 6, 2020, Blankmeyer stepped down from St. John's and became the manager of the Brooklyn Cyclones. In 2022. he returned to the university as an adjunct associate professor.

== Head coaching record ==
Below is a table of Blankmeyer's yearly records as an NCAA head baseball coach.

Record table
Season	Team	Overall	Conference	Standing	Postseason
St. John's Red Storm (Big East Conference) (1996–2019)
1996	St. John's	26–18	14–10	3rd (American)	Big East tournament
1997	St. John's	35–17	16–7	2nd (American)	NCAA Regional
1998	St. John's	28–17–1	14–7	3rd	Big East tournament
1999	St. John's	32–22–2	13–10–1	5th	Big East tournament
2000	St. John's	29–22	8–15	8th	
2001	St. John's	31–22	13–13	5th	
2002	St. John's	29–23	14–12	6th	
2003	St. John's	29–27	12–14	7th	
2004	St. John's	37–23	17–9	2nd	NCAA Regional
2005	St. John's	41–18	19–4	1st	NCAA Regional
2006	St. John's	40–19	16–10	4th	Big East tournament
2007	St. John's	41–19	20–7	1st	NCAA Regional
2008	St. John's	42–16	20–7	1st	NCAA Regional
2009	St. John's	30–22	16–11	4th	Big East tournament
2010	St. John's	43–20	16–11	4th	NCAA Regional
2011	St. John's	36–22	18–8	2nd	NCAA Regional
2012	St. John's	40–21	18–9	T–1st	NCAA Super Regional
2013	St. John's	23–35	10–14	T–6th	Big East tournament
2014	St. John's	35–20	13–5	2nd	Big East tournament
2015	St. John's	41–16	14–3	1st	NCAA Regional
2016	St. John's	28–26–1	9–9	4th	Big East tournament
2017	St. John's	42–13	13–5	2nd	NCAA Regional
2018	St. John's	40–16	15–3	1st	NCAA Regional
2019	St. John's	31–23	9–9	T–3rd	Big East tournament
Total:		829–499–4			
National champion Postseason invitational champion Conference regular season champion Conference regular season and conference tournament champion Division regular season champion Division regular season and conference tournament champion Conference tournament champion
