= 1999 Big East Conference baseball tournament =

American college baseball tournament

- Teams: 6
- Format: Double-elimination tournament
- Finals site: Mercer County Waterfront Park; Trenton, New Jersey
- Champions: Providence (2nd title)
- Winning coach: Charlie Hickey (1st title)
- MVP: Marc DesRoches (Providence)

1999 Big East Conference baseball standings
	Conf.						Overall
Team	W		L		T	PCT	W		L		T	PCT
Notre Dame ‍†‍‍^{y}	20	–	5	–	0	.800	43	–	18	–	0	.705
Rutgers ‍‍‍^{y}	19	–	7	–	0	.731	37	–	21	–	0	.638
Providence ‍‍‡‍^{y}	18	–	8	–	0	.692	49	–	16	–	0	.754
Seton Hall ‍‍‍	14	–	11	–	0	.560	32	–	19	–	1	.625
St. John's ‍‍‍	13	–	11	–	1	.540	32	–	22	–	2	.589
West Virginia ‍‍‍	12	–	13	–	0	.480	29	–	28	–	0	.509
Villanova ‍‍‍	11	–	15	–	0	.423	27	–	26	–	1	.509
Pittsburgh ‍‍‍	11	–	15	–	0	.423	27	–	27	–	0	.500
Boston College ‍‍‍	10	–	15	–	1	.404	26	–	21	–	1	.552
Connecticut ‍‍‍	10	–	16	–	0	.385	27	–	24	–	0	.529
Georgetown ‍‍‍	2	–	24	–	0	.077	18	–	34	–	0	.346
† – Conference champion ‡ – Tournament champion y – Invited to the NCAA tournament As of June 30, 1999; Rankings from Collegiate Baseball

The 1999 Big East Conference baseball tournament was held at Mercer County Waterfront Park in Trenton, New Jersey. This was the fifteenth annual Big East Conference baseball tournament, and first to be held outside the state of Connecticut. The Providence Friars won the tournament championship and claimed the Big East Conference's automatic bid to the 1999 NCAA Division I baseball tournament.

== Format and seeding ==
The Big East baseball tournament was a 6 team double elimination tournament in 1999. The top six regular season finishers were seeded one through six based on conference winning percentage only.

Team	W	L	T	Pct.	GB	Seed
Notre Dame	20	5	0	.800	–	1
Rutgers	19	7	0	.731	1.5	2
Providence	18	8	0	.692	2.5	3
Seton Hall	14	11	0	.560	6	4
St. John's	13	11	1	.540	7	5
West Virginia	12	13	0	.480	8	6
Villanova	11	15	0	.423	9.5	–
Pittsburgh	11	15	0	.423	9.5	–
Boston College	10	15	1	.404	10	–
Connecticut	10	16	0	.385	11.5	–
Georgetown	2	24	0	.077	18.5	–

== Bracket ==
First round
1	Notre Dame	7
6	West Virginia	2
2	Rutgers	13
5	St. John's	9
3	Providence	10
4	Seton Hall	9

Second round
1	Notre Dame	3
4	Seton Hall	11
5	St. John's	9
6	West Virginia	6
2	Rutgers	11
3	Providence	4
3	Providence	8
1	Notre Dame	4

Third round
4	Seton Hall	2
5	St. John's	7
2	Rutgers	2
3	Providence	9

Semifinals
5	St. John's	6
2	Rutgers	4

Final
5	St. John's	1
3	Providence	6

== Jack Kaiser Award ==
Marc DesRoches was the winner of the 1999 Jack Kaiser Award. DesRoches was a senior pitcher for Providence.
