= 2011 Big East Conference baseball tournament =

American college baseball tournament

- Teams: 8
- Format: Double-elimination tournament
- Finals site: Bright House Field; Clearwater, FL
- Champions: Seton Hall (3rd title)
- Winning coach: Rob Sheppard (2nd title)
- MVP: Joe DiRocco (Seton Hall)
- Television: ESPNU (championship game)

2011 Big East Conference baseball standings
	Conf.						Overall
Team	W		L		T	PCT	W		L		T	PCT
#13 Connecticut †^{y} ‍‍‍	22	–	5	–	0	.815	45	–	20	–	1	.689
St. John's ‍‍‍^{y}	18	–	8	–	0	.692	35	–	22	–	0	.614
Pittsburgh ‍‍‍	16	–	11	–	0	.593	33	–	23	–	0	.589
Seton Hall ‍‍‡‍^{y}	14	–	13	–	0	.519	34	–	25	–	0	.576
Cincinnati ‍‍‍	14	–	13	–	0	.519	30	–	27	–	0	.526
Louisville ‍‍‍	14	–	13	–	0	.519	32	–	29	–	0	.525
West Virginia ‍‍‍	14	–	13	–	0	.519	28	–	27	–	0	.509
Notre Dame ‍‍‍	13	–	13	–	0	.500	23	–	29	–	0	.442
South Florida ‍‍‍	13	–	14	–	0	.481	25	–	29	–	0	.463
Rutgers ‍‍‍	11	–	16	–	0	.407	20	–	30	–	0	.400
Villanova ‍‍‍	7	–	20	–	0	.259	20	–	32	–	0	.385
Georgetown ‍‍‍	5	–	22	–	0	.185	23	–	33	–	0	.411
† – Conference champion ‡ – Tournament champion y – Invited to the NCAA Division I Baseball Championship; As of June 30, 2011; Rankings from Collegiate Baseball

The 2011 Big East baseball tournament was held from May 25 through 29, 2011. It was an eight-team double elimination tournament. Seton Hall was their third tournament championship and claimed the league's automatic bid to the 2011 NCAA Division I baseball tournament.

== Format and seeding ==
The Big East baseball tournament was an 8 team double elimination tournament in 2009. The top eight regular season finishers were seeded one through eight based on conference winning percentage only. The field was divided into two brackets, with the winners of each bracket meeting in a single championship game.

Team	W	L	Pct.	GB	Seed
Connecticut	22	5	.815	–	1
St. John's	18	8	.692	3.5	2
Pittsburgh	16	11	.593	6	3
West Virginia	14	13	.519	8	4
Seton Hall	14	13	.519	8	5
Louisville	14	13	.519	8	6
Cincinnati	14	13	.519	8	7
Notre Dame	13	13	.500	8.5	8
South Florida	13	14	.481	9	–
Rutgers	11	16	.407	11	–
Villanova	7	20	.259	15	–
Georgetown	5	22	.185	17	–

=== Bracket ===
First round
3	Pittsburgh	7
6	Louisville	2
2	St. John's	8
7	Cincinnati	3
7	Cincinnati	3
6	Louisville	5
1	Connecticut	4
8	Notre Dame	2
4	West Virginia	4
5	Seton Hall	10
4	West Virginia	0
8	Notre Dame	1

Second round
3	Pittsburgh	4
2	St. John's	6
3	Pittsburgh	2
6	Louisville	12^
1	Connecticut	3~
5	Seton Hall	4~
1	Connecticut	9
4	Notre Dame	3

Semifinals
2	St. John's	5	5
6	Louisville	7	1
5	Seton Hall	12^	—
1	Connecticut	2^	—

Final
2	St. John's	2
5	Seton Hall	4

- ~ Game went to extra innings
- ^ Game ended after 8 innings because of mercy rule

== All-Tournament Team ==
The following players were named to the All-Tournament team.

Position	Player	School
P	Cole Johnson	Notre Dame
P	Joe DiRocco	Seton Hall
C	Kevan Smith	Pittsburgh
IF	Mike Nemeth	Connecticut
IF	Ryan Wright	Louisville
IF	Joe Panik	St. John's
IF	Mike Genovese	Seton Hall
OF	Kevin Grove	St. John's
OF	Zach Granite	Seton Hall
OF	Will Walsh	Seton Hall
DH	Jeff Gardner	Louisville

== Jack Kaiser Award ==
Joe DiRocco was the winner of the 2011 Jack Kaiser Award. DiRocco was a senior pitcher for Seton Hall.
