= 2019 Big East Conference baseball tournament =

American college baseball tournament

- Teams: 4
- Format: Double-elimination tournament
- Finals site: Prasco Park; Mason, Ohio
- Champions: Creighton (1st title)
- Winning coach: Ed Servais (1st title)
- Television: Big East DN; FS2 (final)

2019 Big East Conference baseball standings
	Conf.				Overall
Team	W		L	PCT	W		L	PCT
No. 22 Creighton ‍†‍‡‍^{y}	14	–	4	.778	41	–	13	.759
Xavier ‍‍‍	12	–	4	.750	27	–	31	.466
St. John's ‍‍‍	9	–	9	.500	31	–	23	.574
Seton Hall ‍‍‍	9	–	9	.500	25	–	28	.472
Georgetown ‍‍‍	7	–	11	.389	22	–	34	.393
Butler ‍‍‍	6	–	11	.353	26	–	26	.500
Villanova ‍‍‍	4	–	13	.235	13	–	38	.255
† – Conference champion ‡ – Tournament champion y – Invited to the NCAA tournament As of July 16, 2019; Rankings from D1Baseball

The 2019 Big East Conference baseball tournament was held at Prasco Park in Mason, Ohio, from May 23 through 26. The event, held at the end of the conference regular season, determined the champion of the Big East Conference for the 2019 season. The winner of the double-elimination tournament, Creighton, received the conference's automatic bid to the 2019 NCAA Division I baseball tournament.

== Format and seeding ==
The tournament used a double-elimination format and featured the top four finishers of the Big East's seven teams.

Team	W	L	Pct	GB	Seed
Creighton	14	4	.778	—	1
Xavier	12	4	.722	2	2
St. John's	9	9	.500	5	3
Seton Hall	9	9	.500	5	4
Georgetown	7	11	.389	7	—
Butler	6	11	.353	8	—
Villanova	4	13	.235	10	—

== Bracket ==
First round
1	Creighton	10
4	Seton Hall	9
2	Xavier	0
3	St. John's	2
Lower round 1
4	Seton Hall	1
2	Xavier	2

Semi-finals
1	Creighton	17
3	St. John's	13
Lower final
2	Xavier	11
3	St. John's	3

Finals
1	Creighton
2	Xavier

== Conference championship ==
Big East Championship
(2) Xavier Musketeers	vs.	(1) Creighton Bluejays

May 25, 2019, 6:00 p.m. (EDT) at Prasco Park in Mason, Ohio
Team	1	2	3	4	5	6	7	8	9	R	H	E
(2) Xavier	3	0	0	0	3	2	0	0	0	8	10	1
(1) Creighton	4	0	0	3	2	0	0	0	X	9	17	1
WP: John Sakowski (7–0) LP: Nick Zwack (4–3) Sv: None; Home runs: XAV: Conor Grammes (8); Allbry Major (7); CREI: None
