= Bobby Lewis (disambiguation) =

Bobby Lewis (1925–2020) was an American R&B and rock and roll singer.

Bobby Lewis may also refer to:

- Bobby Lewis (basketball, born 1946), American basketball player, UPI All-American; South Carolina State College graduate
- Bobby Lewis (basketball, born 1945), American basketball player, for NBA teams; University of North Carolina graduate
- Bobby Lewis (country singer) (born 1942), American country music singer-songwriter
- Bobby Lewis (baseball) (1929–1995), American baseball coach
- Robert Lewis (jockey) (1878–1947), Australian jockey
- Bobbie Lewis Quality, Australian Horse race

== See also ==
- Robert Lewis (disambiguation)
