= Big East Conference baseball tournament =

- Conference baseball championship
- Big East Conference logo
- Sport: Baseball
- Conference: Big East Conference
- Number of teams: 4
- Format: Double-elimination tournament
- Current stadium: Prasco Park
- Current location: Mason, Ohio
- Played: 1985–present
- Last contest: 2026
- Current champion: St. John's
- Most championships: St. John's (11)
- Official website: BigEast.org Baseball

Host stadiums
- Prasco Park (2018–2028); TD Ameritrade Park Omaha (2015, 2017); Leidos Field at Ripken Stadium (2016); MCU Park (2007, 2014); Bright House Field (2006, 2008–2013); Commerce Bank Ballpark (2000–2005); Waterfront Park (1999); Dodd Stadium (1996–1998); Muzzy Field (1985–1995)

Host locations
- Mason, OH (2018–2028); Omaha, NE (2015, 2017); Aberdeen, MD (2016); Brooklyn, NY (2007, 2014); Clearwater, FL (2006, 2008–2013); Bridgewater, NJ (2000–2005); Trenton, NJ (1999); Norwich, CT (1996–1998); Bristol, CT (1985–1995)

The Big East Conference baseball tournament is the conference championship tournament in baseball for the Big East Conference. It is a double-elimination tournament and seeding is based on regular-season records. The winner receives the conference's automatic bid to the NCAA Division I baseball tournament. The Big East Tournament champion is separate from the conference champion. The conference championship is determined solely by regular-season record.

From 1985 to 2013, the tournament was sponsored by the old Big East Conference. Starting with the 2014 tournament, it has been sponsored by the newly formed, non-football Big East Conference.

== Tournament ==
The Big East Conference baseball tournament is a four-team double-elimination tournament, held annually at various locations in the Big East Conference region. The four teams with the best conference record at the end of the regular season earn berths in the tournament. The winner earns the Big East's automatic bid to the NCAA Division I baseball tournament. The remaining Big East teams can also qualify for the 64-team NCAA Tournament by receiving an at-large bid.

== History ==
The tournament was first held in 1985.

=== 1985–1995 ===
The Big East Conference Baseball Tournament was established in 1985 as the championship event for Big East baseball teams. The tournament determined the conference’s automatic bid to the NCAA Division I Baseball Tournament. Between 1985 and 1995, the event was held at Muzzy Field in Bristol, Connecticut, and it utilized a four-team, double-elimination format.

=== Legacy ===
During this period, St. John’s dominated with four championships, while Villanova and Connecticut each won two titles. The Big East Tournament established itself as a key event in the college baseball postseason, offering teams a pathway to the NCAA Tournament. Muzzy Field remained the consistent venue, providing a classic baseball setting for these competitive matchups.

=== 1996–2000 ===
The Big East Conference Baseball Tournament expanded in 1996, shifting from a four-team to a six-team format. The tournament determined the conference’s automatic bid to the NCAA Division I Baseball Tournament. During this period, the event saw increased competition and new champions emerging.

=== Legacy ===
During this period, the tournament saw increased competition with the expansion to six teams in 1996. Notre Dame emerged as a powerhouse with consecutive championships, while Rutgers solidified its place as a title contender by winning in 1999 and 2000. The tournament continued to be a key event in the Big East baseball landscape, helping teams gain national recognition and NCAA Tournament berths.

=== 2001–2005 ===
The tournament returned to a four-team, double-elimination format.

The Big East Conference Baseball Tournament continued to evolve in the early 2000s. The tournament remained a crucial event for teams seeking an automatic bid to the NCAA Division I Baseball Tournament. During this period, powerhouse programs solidified their dominance, and new contenders emerged.

=== Legacy ===
Between 2001 and 2005, Notre Dame continued to be the dominant program, winning three championships during this stretch. Rutgers and Boston College also emerged as strong contenders, with Boston College winning its first-ever title. The tournament remained an important pathway for Big East teams seeking national recognition and NCAA postseason berths.

=== 2006–2013 ===
The tournament was expanded to become an eight-team, double-elimination tournament.

=== 2014 ===
In the 2012–2013 academic year, the old Big East Conference had 15 members. In its inaugural 2013–2014 academic year, the new Big East Conference had only 10 members.

With only seven baseball-sponsoring schools in the conference, the top four teams participate.

== Champions by year ==
Year	Champion	Site	Jack Kaiser Award (Most Outstanding Player)
1985	St. John's	Muzzy Field • Bristol, CT	Joe Armeni, Seton Hall
1986	St. John's	Muzzy Field • Bristol, CT	Tom Finke, St. John's
1987	Seton Hall	Muzzy Field • Bristol, CT	Mo Vaughn, Seton Hall
1988	St. John's	Muzzy Field • Bristol, CT	Mike Weinberg, St. John's
1989	Villanova	Muzzy Field • Bristol, CT	Rafael Novoa, Villanova
1990	Connecticut	Muzzy Field • Bristol, CT	Craig MacDonald, Connecticut
1991	Villanova	Muzzy Field • Bristol, CT	Mike Neill, Villanova
1992	Providence	Muzzy Field • Bristol, CT	Jim Foster, Providence
1993	St. John's	Muzzy Field • Bristol, CT	Mike Maerten, St. John's
1994	Connecticut	Muzzy Field • Bristol, CT	Chris Bisson, Connecticut
1995	Pittsburgh	Muzzy Field • Bristol, CT	Jon DeBernardis, Pittsburgh
1996	West Virginia	Dodd Stadium • Norwich, CT	Chris Enochs, West Virginia
1997	St. John's	Dodd Stadium • Norwich, CT	Mike Dzurilla, St. John's
1998	Rutgers	Dodd Stadium • Norwich, CT	Dave Marciniak, Rutgers
1999	Providence	Waterfront Park • Trenton, NJ	Marc DesRoches, Providence
2000	Rutgers	Commerce Bank Ballpark • Bridgewater, NJ	Bobby Brownlie, Rutgers
2001	Seton Hall	Commerce Bank Ballpark • Bridgewater, NJ	Isaac Pavlik, Seton Hall
2002	Notre Dame	Commerce Bank Ballpark • Bridgewater, NJ	Steve Stanley, Notre Dame
2003	Notre Dame	Commerce Bank Ballpark • Bridgewater, NJ	Javi Sanchez, Notre Dame
2004	Notre Dame	Commerce Bank Ballpark • Bridgewater, NJ	Matt Macri, Notre Dame
2005	Notre Dame	Commerce Bank Ballpark • Bridgewater, NJ	Matt Edwards, Notre Dame
2006	Notre Dame	Bright House Field • Clearwater, FL	Wade Korpi, Notre Dame
2007	Rutgers	KeySpan Park • Brooklyn, NY	Todd Frazier, Rutgers
2008	Louisville	Bright House Field • Clearwater, FL	Chris Dominguez, Louisville
2009	Louisville	Bright House Field • Clearwater, FL	Andrew Clark, Louisville
2010	St. John's	Bright House Field • Clearwater, FL	Kyle Hansen, St. John's
2011	Seton Hall	Bright House Field • Clearwater, FL	Joe DiRocco, Seton Hall
2012	St. John's	Bright House Field • Clearwater, FL	Matt Carasiti, St. John's
2013	Connecticut	Bright House Field • Clearwater, FL	Billy Ferriter, Connecticut
2014	Xavier	MCU Park • Brooklyn, NY	Mitch Elliott, Xavier
2015	St. John's	TD Ameritrade Park Omaha • Omaha, NE	Alex Caruso, St. John's
2016	Xavier	Leidos Field at Ripken Stadium • Aberdeen, MD	Daniel Rizzie, Xavier
2017	Xavier	TD Ameritrade Park Omaha • Omaha, NE	Conor Grammes, Xavier
2018	St. John's	Prasco Park • Mason, OH	Jeff Belge, St. John's
2019	Creighton	Prasco Park • Mason, OH	Jack Strunc, Creighton
2020	Canceled due to COVID-19		
2021	UConn	Prasco Park • Mason, OH	Kyler Fedko, UConn
2022	UConn	Prasco Park • Mason, OH	Luke Franzoni, Xavier
2023	Xavier	Prasco Park • Mason, OH	Jack Housinger, Xavier
2024	St. John's	Prasco Park • Mason, OH	Jimmy Keenan, St. John's
2025	Creighton	Prasco Park • Mason, OH	Connor Capece, Creighton
2026	St. John's	Prasco Park • Mason, OH	Rocco Gump, Creighton

All championship information, including tournament results, all-tournament teams, and Jack Kaiser award winners, can be found on pages 64–66 of the 2009 Big East Baseball Media Guide.

== Championships by school ==
School	Tournament Titles	Title Years
St. John's	11	1985, 1986, 1988, 1993, 1997, 2010, 2012, 2015, 2018, 2024, 2026
Notre Dame	5	2002, 2003, 2004, 2005, 2006
UConn	5	1990, 1994, 2013, 2021, 2022
Xavier	4	2014, 2016, 2017, 2023
Seton Hall	3	1987, 2001, 2011
Rutgers	3	1998, 2000, 2007
Creighton	2	2019, 2025
Louisville	2	2008, 2009
Providence	2	1992, 1999
Villanova	2	1989, 1991
Pittsburgh	1	1995
West Virginia	1	1996
Georgetown	0	
Butler	0	

- Programs highlighted in pink indicate that the program is no longer a Big East member. Providence shut down the baseball program in 1999.

== See also ==
- Baseball awards#U.S. college baseball
