= 2015 Big East Conference baseball tournament =

American college baseball tournament

- Teams: 4
- Format: Double-elimination tournament
- Finals site: TD Ameritrade Park; Omaha, NE
- Champions: St. John's (8th title)
- Television: Fox Sports 1 (final)

2015 Big East Conference baseball standings
	Conf.				Overall
Team	W		L	PCT	W		L	PCT
No. 30 St. John's ‍‍‍	14	–	3	.824	28	–	24	.538
Creighton ‍‍‍	13	–	4	.765	27	–	14	.659
Seton Hall ‍‍‍	9	–	9	.500	21	–	20	.512
Georgetown ‍‍‍	8	–	10	.444	22	–	22	.500
Butler ‍‍‍	8	–	10	.444	18	–	27	.400
Villanova ‍‍‍	7	–	11	.389	19	–	24	.442
Xavier ‍‍‍	3	–	15	.167	13	–	33	.283
‡ – Tournament champion As of May 4, 2015; Rankings from Collegiate Baseball

The 2015 Big East Conference baseball tournament was held at TD Ameritrade Park in Omaha, Nebraska, from May 21 through 24. The event, held at the end of the conference regular season, determined the champion of the Big East Conference for the 2015 season. The winner of the double-elimination tournament received the conference's automatic bid to the 2015 NCAA Division I baseball tournament.

== Format and seeding ==
The tournament will use a double-elimination format and feature the top four finishers of the Big East's seven teams.

== Bracket ==
First round
1	St. John's	2
4	Georgetown	1
2	Creighton	7
3	Seton Hall	4
Lower round 1
4	Georgetown	1
3	Seton Hall	5

Semi-finals
1	St. John's	8
2	Creighton	1
Lower final
3	Seton Hall	1
2	Creighton	12

Finals
1	St. John's
2	Creighton
