= 2016 Big East Conference baseball tournament =

American college baseball tournament

- Teams: 4
- Format: Double-elimination tournament
- Finals site: Leidos Field at Ripken Stadium; Aberdeen, Maryland
- Champions: Xavier (2nd title)
- Winning coach: Scott Googins (2nd title)
- MVP: Daniel Rizzie (Xavier)
- Television: Fox Sports 1 (final)

2016 Big East Conference baseball standings
	Conf.						Overall
Team	W		L		T	PCT	W		L		T	PCT
No. 21 Xavier ‍†‍‡‍^{y}	14	–	4	–	0	.778	30	–	28	–	0	.517
Creighton ‍‍‍	13	–	5	–	0	.722	38	–	17	–	0	.691
Seton Hall ‍‍‍	10	–	8	–	0	.556	38	–	20	–	0	.655
St. John's ‍‍‍	9	–	9	–	0	.500	28	–	26	–	1	.518
Georgetown ‍‍‍	8	–	10	–	0	.444	25	–	29	–	0	.463
Villanova ‍‍‍	5	–	13	–	0	.278	20	–	32	–	0	.385
Butler ‍‍‍	4	–	14	–	0	.222	14	–	40	–	0	.259
† – Conference champion ‡ – Tournament champion y – Invited to the NCAA tournament As of June 4, 2016; Rankings from Collegiate Baseball

The 2016 Big East Conference baseball tournament was held at Leidos Field at Ripken Stadium in Aberdeen, Maryland from May 26 through 29. The event, held at the end of the conference regular season, determined the champion of the Big East Conference for the 2016 season. Xavier won the double-elimination tournament and received the conference's automatic bid to the 2016 NCAA Division I baseball tournament.

== Format and seeding ==
The tournament will use a double-elimination format and feature the top four finishers of the Big East's seven teams.

Team	W	L	Pct	GB	Seed
Xavier	14	4	.778	—	1
Creighton	13	5	.722	1	2
Seton Hall	10	8	.556	4	3
St. John's	9	9	.500	5	4
Georgetown	8	10	.444	6	—
Villanova	5	13	.278	9	—
Butler	4	14	.222	10	—

== Bracket ==
First round
1	Xavier	9
4	St. John's	8
3	Seton Hall	5
2	Creighton	6
Lower round 1
4	St. John's	4
3	Seton Hall	1

Semi-finals
1	Xavier	5
2	Creighton	3
Lower final
4	St. John's	3
2	Creighton	4

Finals
1	Xavier
2	Creighton
