= Ripken Stadium =

Sports stadium in Aberdeen, Maryland

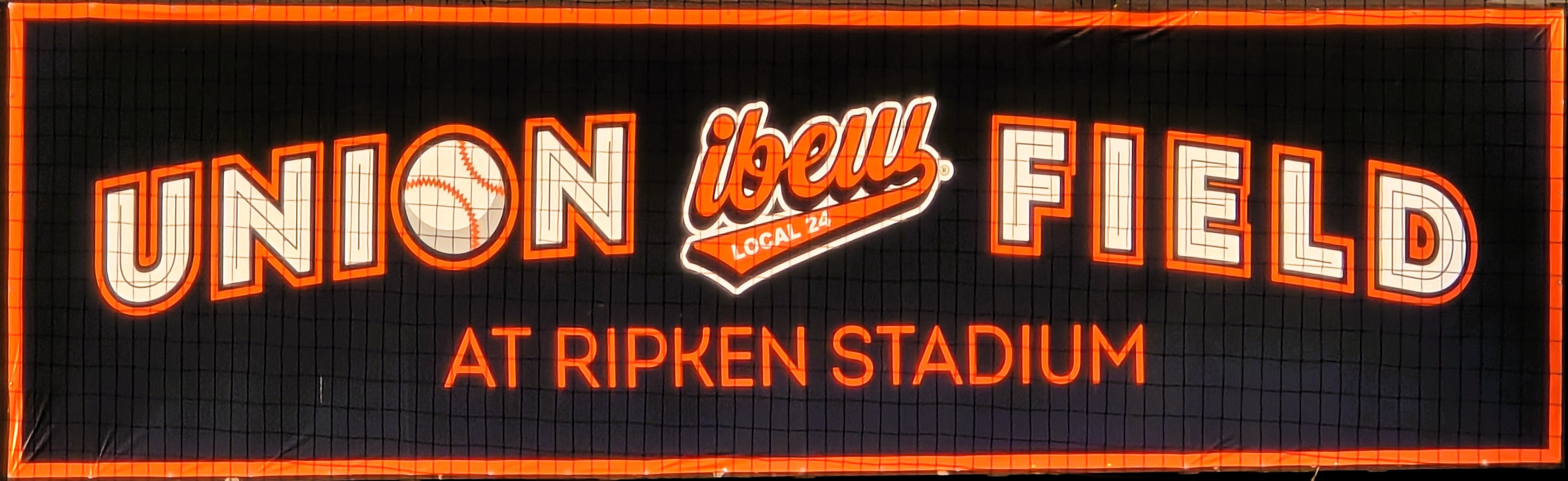

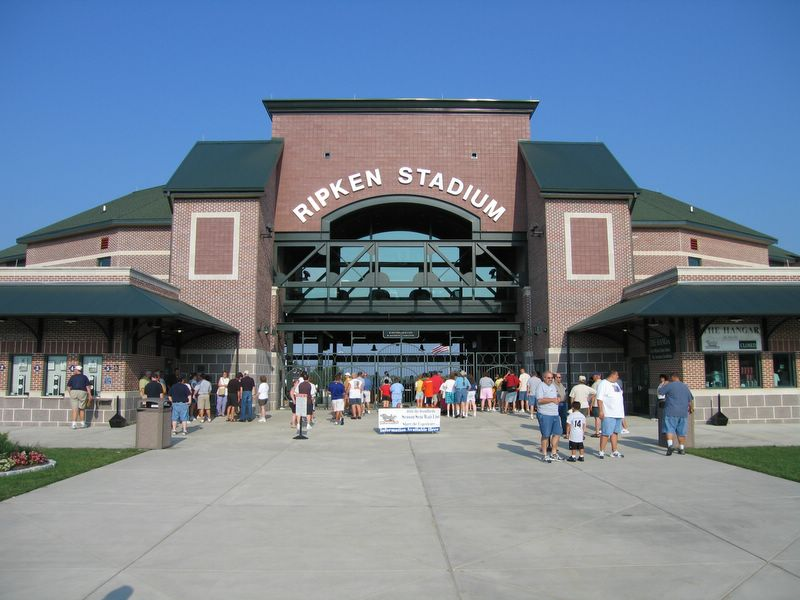
- The entrance of Ripken Stadium

- Location within Maryland Location within the United States
- Interactive map of Ripken Stadium
- Full name: IBEW 24 Union Field at Ripken Stadium
- Former names: Ripken Stadium (2002–2014); Leidos Field at Ripken Stadium (2015–2024); Ripken Stadium (2025)
- Address: 873 Long Drive; Aberdeen, Maryland 21001
- Coordinates: 39.530873°N 76.185985°W
- Owner: City of Aberdeen
- Operator: Maryland Stadium Authority
- Capacity: 6,300
- Surface: Artificial Turf
- Field size: Left Field: 310 ft (94 m); Center Field: 400 ft (122 m); Right Field: 310 ft (94 m)

Construction
- Groundbreaking: October 19, 2000
- Opened: June 18, 2002
- Cost: $18 million ($32.2 million in 2025 dollars)
- Architects: Design Exchange Architects Inc. Ripken Design
- Project manager: Heery International
- General contractor: Baltimore Contractors LLC

Tenant
- Aberdeen IronBirds (NYPL/South Atlantic League/MLB Draft League) 2002–present

Website
- www.mlbdraftleague.com/aberdeen/ballpark/ripken-stadium

Ripken Stadium (in full, IBEW 24 Union Field at Ripken Stadium) is the home of the Aberdeen IronBirds, a summer collegiate baseball team in the MLB Draft League. The stadium is located in Aberdeen, Maryland. The 6,300-seat Ripken Stadium held its first game on June 18, 2002. As of 2011 the team had sold out every home game at Ripken Stadium since it began playing there in 2002.

The stadium is part of Cal Ripken Jr.'s Aberdeen Complex in his hometown of Aberdeen, Maryland, located just off Interstate 95 at Maryland Route 22. Ripken Stadium is only 2.9 miles off the East Coast Greenway. The complex also includes several smaller fields for local youth sports leagues, as well as an adjacent Marriott hotel. The stadium is the closest structure of the complex to the highway, with the right field fence and scoreboard visible from it. The stadium hosts soccer matches as well.

The expansive parking lot of Ripken Stadium is frequently used as a venue for SCCA autocross racing for many racers on the east coast.

In August 2025, it was announced that the Frederick Keys would replace the IronBirds as the Baltimore Orioles' High-A affiliate, with the IronBirds moving to the MLB Draft League.

== Naming rights ==
The ballpark was initially named Ripken Stadium. Leidos became the naming rights sponsor in 2015. Their deal ended before the 2025 season and the name reverted to Ripken Stadium again. It was confirmed in March 2026 that the team was seeking a new naming rights sponsor. In June 2026, the local branch of the International Brotherhood of Electrical Workers bought the naming rights, renaming the stadium to IBEW 24 Union Field at Ripken Stadium. Neither the cost nor the length of the agreement was announced.

== Features ==
The stadium features a three-tiered cafe behind home plate, available for patrons who want to have dinner and drinks during a game. The upper level has a press box behind home plate, 256 club seats and six skyboxes. Ripken Stadium was one of the first short-season Single-A ballparks to have a fully enclosed club level and skyboxes. A new synthetic turf playing surface and LED sports lighting were installed prior to the 2021 regular season.

== Notable events ==
In 2009, The Maryland Redbirds, of the Cal Ripken Sr. Collegiate Baseball League, (the CRSCBL), played all weekday games and one weekend doubleheader at the stadium. The CRSCBL previously used the stadium for the annual all-star game in 2005 and 2007. The stadium also hosted the inaugural Ripken Cup collegiate baseball invitational between University of Maryland and Towson University on April 15, 2014, and May 7, 2014. The 2016 Big East Conference baseball tournament was held in Aberdeen May 26–29.

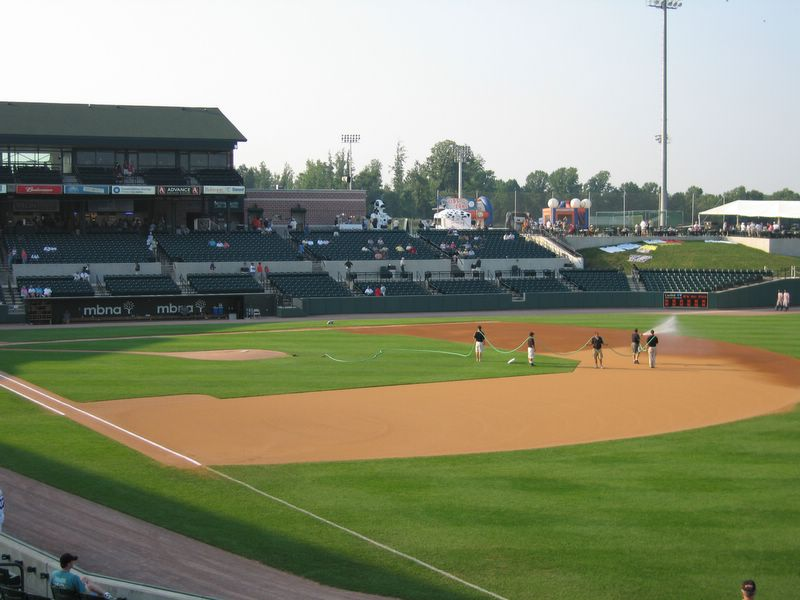
An inside view of Ripken Stadium.
