= Bobby Lewis (baseball) =

American baseball coach

Biographical details
- Born: May 1, 1929
- Died: February 22, 1995 (aged 65); Upper St. Clair Township, Pennsylvania, U.S.

Coaching career (HC unless noted)
- 1955–1990: Pittsburgh

Head coaching record
- Overall: 438–389

Robert Hilton Lewis (May 1, 1929 – February 22, 1995) was an American baseball coach. He was the head coach of the Pittsburgh Panthers baseball team for 36 years, from 1955 to 1990. He compiled a 438–389 record as Pitt's baseball coach. He was also a member of the University of Pittsburgh faculty in the Health, Physical Education and Recreation Department in the School of Education. His players at Pitt included Doc Medich, Ken Macha, and Mike Ditka. Lewis had previously played baseball at Pitt from 1949 to 1951 and was the team's co-most valuable player in 1950 and the team captain in 1951. He died of cancer in 1995 at age 65.
