= Prasco Park =

Baseball park in Mason, Ohio

- Interactive map of Prasco Park
- Location: 6125 Commerce Court; Mason, Ohio 45040; United States
- Coordinates: 39.330866°N 84.334257°W
- Owner: Prasco Laboratories
- Capacity: 1,250
- Surface: Natural grass
- Field size: Foul lines: 320 feet Power alleys: 380 feet Center field: 400 feet

Construction
- Opened: June 19, 2008

Tenants
- Big East Tournament (2018–present); G-MAC Tournament (2014–present)

Prasco Park is a baseball park located in Mason, Ohio, a suburb of Cincinnati. The ballpark opened in June 2008 on the campus of Prasco Laboratories, a pharmaceutical company. The facility serves as the home for a youth travel baseball club, the Cincinnati Spikes, and additionally hosts major college baseball tournaments. Prasco Park hosts conference championship tournaments for both the Big East Conference and the Great Midwest Athletic Conference.
