= Mike Neill =

American baseball player (born 1970)

- Outfielder
- Born: April 27, 1970 (age 54); Martinsville, Virginia, U.S.
- Batted: Left Threw: Left

MLB debut
- July 27, 1998, for the Oakland Athletics

Last MLB appearance
- August 1, 1998, for the Oakland Athletics

MLB statistics
- Batting average: .267
- Home runs: 0
- Runs batted in: 0
- Stats at Baseball Reference

Teams
- Oakland Athletics (1998)
Medals
Men's baseball
Representing the United States
Olympic Games
Gold medal – first place	2000 Sydney	Team competition
Pan American Games
Silver medal – second place	1999 Winnipeg	Team competition

Michael Robert Neill (born April 27, 1970) is an American former Major League Baseball and Olympic baseball player.

== Career ==
His baseball career included a stint with the Oakland Athletics and ended with the Olympic gold medal team in the 2000 games in Sydney, Australia. He was named Delaware Athlete of the Year in 2000. At Villanova University he compiled a .417 career batting average, led the Wildcats to the 1989 and 1991 Big East Conference crowns and was named 1991 Big East Player of the Year. He established team records of 232 hits, 53 doubles and 379 total bases as well as several single-season records.

Neill won two minor league batting championships and had a .307 batting average over 11 years. He was selected to four all-star teams and was a key player in the Vancouver Canadians' 1999 AAA World Series victory.

He was called up by the Oakland Athletics in 1998 but was sidelined with an injury. Neill led the 2000 USA Olympics team to a 4–0 win over Cuba in the gold-medal game with a first-inning home run and a dramatic sliding catch in the ninth inning. His walk-off homer against Japan won the team's first-round Olympic contest. During the 1999 Pan American Games he had the game-winning hit to clinch the Olympic berth for the USA.

== See also ==
- 1991 College Baseball All-America Team
