= Matt Macri =

American baseball player (born 1982)

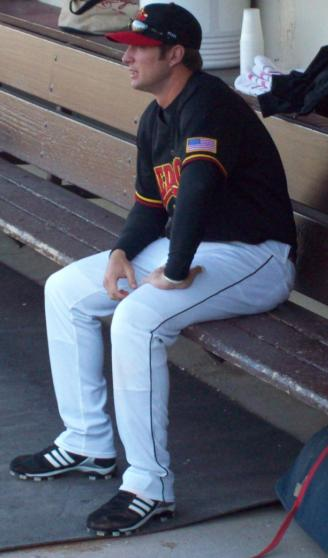
- Marci with the Rochester Red Wings in 2009.
- Third baseman
- Born: May 29, 1982 (age 44); Des Moines, Iowa, U.S.
- Bats: Right Throws: Right

MLB debut
- May 24, 2008, for the Minnesota Twins

Last MLB appearance
- September 19, 2008, for the Minnesota Twins

MLB statistics
- Batting average: .324
- Home runs: 1
- Runs batted in: 4
- Stats at Baseball Reference

Teams
- Minnesota Twins (2008)

Matthew Michael Macri (born May 29, 1982) is an American former Major League Baseball third baseman who played for the Minnesota Twins in 2008.

== Amateur career ==
A native of Des Moines, Iowa, Macri graduated from Dowling Catholic High School in 2001 and went to the University of Notre Dame. In his freshman year, he appeared in just 17 games before undergoing a season-ending Tommy John surgery. In 2003, he played collegiate summer baseball with the Brewster Whitecaps of the Cape Cod Baseball League. In 2004, Macri was named Second Team All-America by Baseball America, Collegiate Baseball Magazine, and USA Today.

== Professional career ==
The Colorado Rockies drafted Macri in the fifth round (140th overall) of the 2004 Major League Baseball draft. He joined the Rockies' Single-A affiliate Tri-City Dust Devils later that year, batting .333 with seven home runs and 43 RBI in 52 games. He finished second in the Northwest League in slugging percentage (.569), third in batting average, and tied for third in triples (four) and on-base percentage (.410). Macri spent a large amount of 2005 on two separate trips to the disabled list with a left wrist sprain. When healthy, he appeared in 64 games with the Rockies' High-A affiliate, the Modesto Nuts, batting .283 with seven home runs and 34 RBI before being called up to the Double-A Tulsa Drillers for one game.

Macri stayed in Tulsa for all of 2006, hitting .233 with eight home runs and 35 RBI in 83 games before suffering a season ending left wrist fracture. He came back to Tulsa in 2007, and finished the season with a .298 average, a career-high 11 home runs and 33 RBI in 79 games. Macri was called up to the Triple-A Colorado Springs Sky Sox where he played in only three games before being traded to the Twins for pitcher Ramón Ortiz on August 15. He finished the season in Rochester, playing in 14 games and batting .213 with three home runs and 6 RBI. Macri played in the Arizona Fall League in the offseason, helping the Phoenix Desert Dogs win the league championship. He drove in and scored a run in the championship game.

Macri started the 2008 season with Rochester, playing in 25 games before straining his left calf during an at-bat against the Pawtucket Red Sox on April 28.

Macri was called up to the Twins on May 22 when Adam Everett was placed on the disabled list. He made his Major League debut on May 24 against the Detroit Tigers at Comerica Park. He earned his first major league hit in his first at-bat of the game off Nate Robertson. Macri then singled to right in his second major league at-bat and drove in his first RBI.

On August 18, 2009, the Twins designated Macri for assignment to make room on the 40-man roster for Philip Humber.

On December 23, 2010, the Rockies announced that they had signed Macri to a minor league contract. He played with the Triple-A Colorado Springs Sky Sox in 2011, batting .273 with 13 home runs and 65 RBI in 114 games.
