= TD Bank Ballpark =

Baseball field in New Jersey, US

- Jewel of the Atlantic League

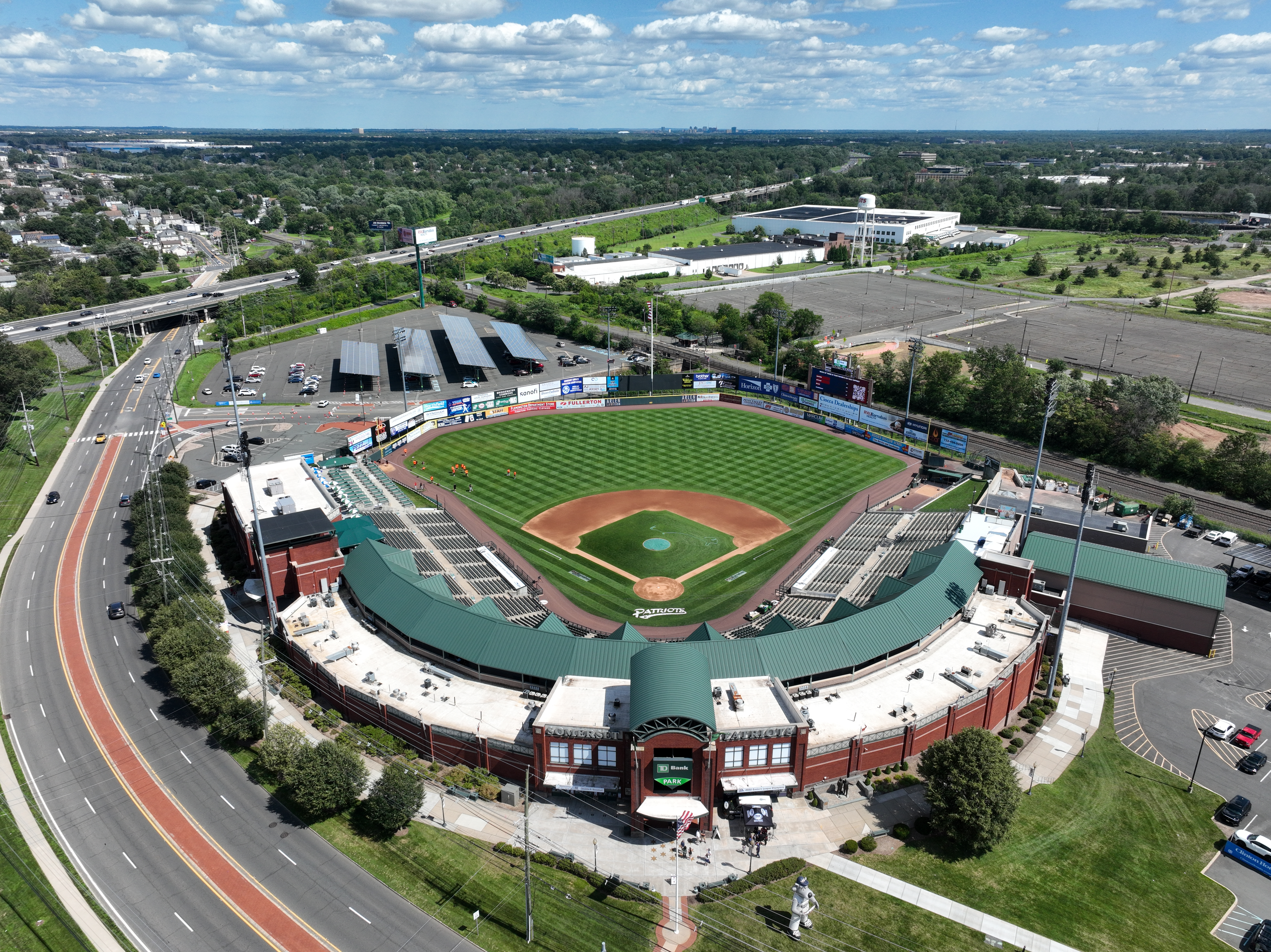
- TD Bank Park in 2023

- Location within New Jersey Location within the United States
- Interactive map of TD Bank Ballpark
- Former names: Somerset Ballpark (1999); Commerce Bank Ballpark (2000–2008)
- Address: 860 East Main Street; Bridgewater, NJ 08807
- Coordinates: 40°33′38″N 74°33′11″W
- Owner: Somerset County Improvement Authority
- Operator: Somerset Patriots
- Capacity: 6,100; expandable to 8,500
- Surface: Grass
- Field size: Left Field: 317 feet (97 m); Center Field: 402 feet (123 m); Right Field: 315 feet (96 m)
- Public transit: Bridgewater station: Raritan Valley Line

Construction
- Groundbreaking: April 28, 1998
- Opened: June 7, 1999
- Cost: $18 million ($96.3 million in 2025 dollars)
- Architects: SSP Architectural Group; Clarke Caton Hintz
- General contractor: Epic Construction

Tenants
- Somerset Patriots (ALPB) 1999–2020, (Double-A NE/EL) 2021–present New Jersey Pride (MLL) 2002–2003; New Jersey Fire (PC) 2004; Sky Blue FC (WPS) 2009 (two games); NY/NJ Comets (NPF) 2013 (part-time)

TD Bank Ballpark is a 6,100-seat baseball park in Bridgewater, New Jersey, that is the home of the Somerset Patriots, a Double-A level Minor League Baseball (MiLB) team affiliate of the New York Yankees in the Eastern League (EL). The Patriots previously competed in the independent Atlantic League of Professional Baseball (ALPB). The ballpark hosts 70 Patriots games as well as Patriots playoff games. In addition, high school and corporate events are held each year.

TD Bank Ballpark is named for TD Bank, N.A., which purchased Commerce Bancorp in 2009. Formerly called Commerce Bank Ballpark, the original naming rights were sold to the institution in July 2000. The ballpark was originally known as Somerset Ballpark. Its first regular season baseball game was held on June 7, 1999. Since its opening, more than eight million fans have attended games at the stadium.

== History ==
Construction on the ballpark commenced on April 28, 1998, with Epic Construction as the general contractor. Construction was financed by Somerset County at a cost of $17.5 million, which is being repaid through a lease agreement with the Patriots that runs through 2032.

TD Bank Ballpark was opened by then–New Jersey governor Christine Todd Whitman and other New Jersey officials on June 7, 1999.

TD Bank Ballpark is the home of the Somerset County Baseball Tournament and was the home of the Big East Conference baseball tournament from 2000-2005. In the off-season, the ballpark has been the site of the Big Apple Circus, most recently in 2016, and other big events. In 2002 and 2003, TD Bank Ballpark was home to the New Jersey Pride of Major League Lacrosse. In 2004, the New Jersey Fire of Pro Cricket played their only season of existence at TD Bank Ballpark. In 2013, the NY/NJ Comets of National Pro Fastpitch played part of their one and only season at TD Bank Ballpark.

In 2000, TD Bank Ballpark hosted the Atlantic League All-Star Game, with a crowd of 7,035. The venue also hosted the 2008 Atlantic League All-Star Game on July 16, breaking both the All-Star Game and ballpark attendance records with 8,290 fans.

In 2007 and 2015, the Atlantic League of Professional Baseball (ALPB) granted TD Bank Ballpark the Atlantic League Ballpark of the Year award.

For two consecutive years in 2015 and 2016, TD Bank Ballpark was named Ballpark Digest's Best Independent Minor League Ballpark in the nation.

The 2017 Atlantic League All-Star Game was held at TD Bank Ballpark on July 12. It was the 20th playing of the All-Star Game with the Freedom Division All-Stars topping the Liberty Division All-Stars by a score of 10–3 in front of 8,175 fans. This was the third time that the ballpark hosted the Atlantic League All-Star Game.

In September 2021, the ballpark was flooded after heavy rains from Tropical Storm Ida. TD Bank Ballpark was also flooded in 1999 during Hurricane Floyd.

On September 28, 2022, the Somerset Patriots clinched the Eastern League championship with a 15–0 combined no-hitter victory in the decisive game of the championship series at TD Bank Ballpark.

On April 8, 2023, the Patriots celebrated welcoming their eight millionth fan to TD Bank Ballpark with numerous prizes during a single admission doubleheader against the Harrisburg Senators.

On June 4, 2024, the Patriots played the Hartford Yard Goats in front of a Double-A era (2021-present) record crowd of 8,260 fans, with the Yard Goats winning 5–4. Reigning American League Cy Young Award winner Gerrit Cole started the game, pitching 3.1 innings allowing 2 hits, no runs, no walks, with 5 strikeouts on a rehab assignment for the New York Yankees.

== Ballpark features ==
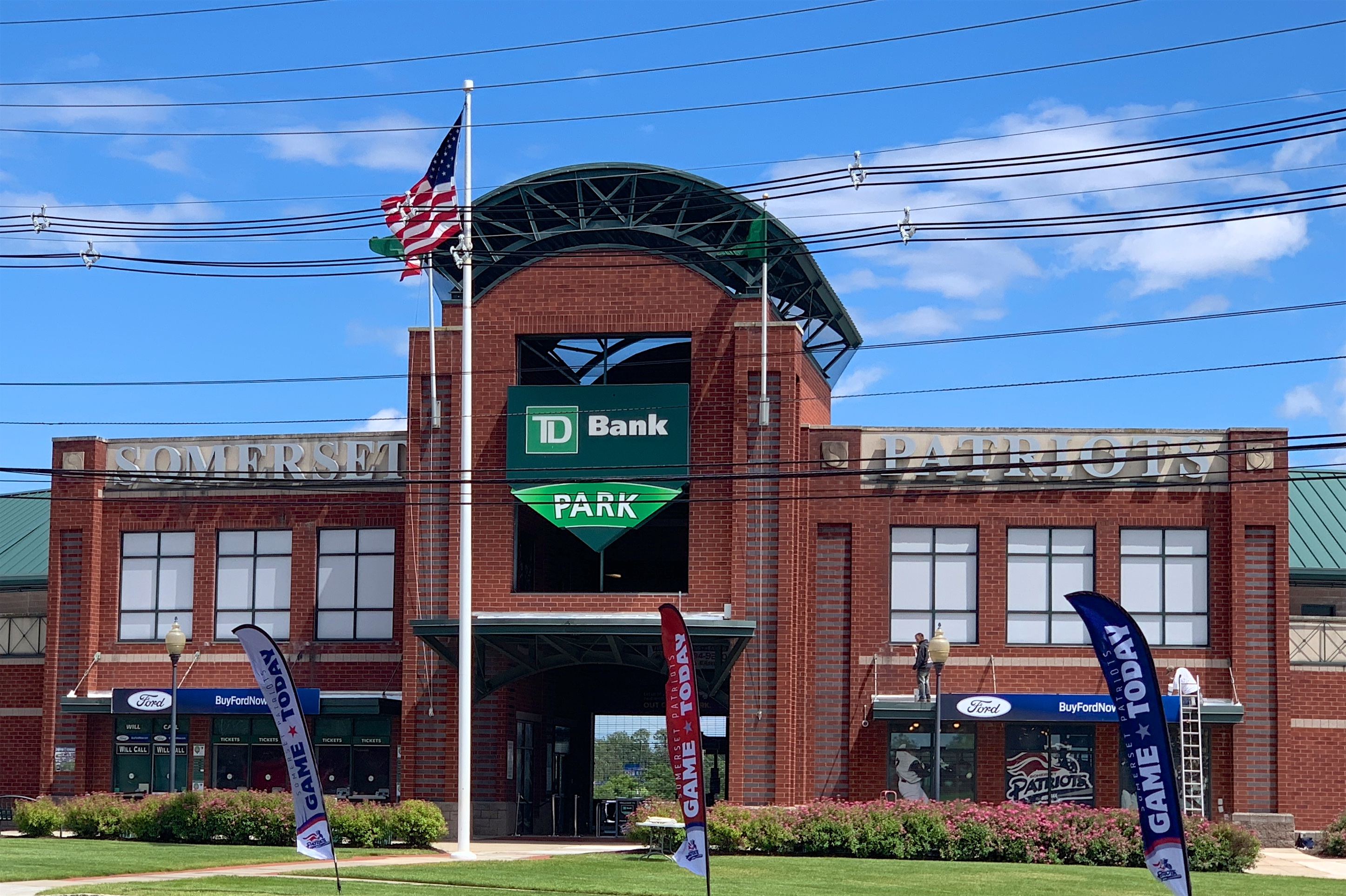
The main entrance to TD Bank Ballpark

TD Bank Ballpark was designed by architectural firms Clarke Caton Hintz and SSP Architectural Group. It is designed and maintained to meet or exceed Triple-A standards per the Atlantic League's facility requirements. The ballpark's wine-colored brick and green exposed steel façade and gabled metal roof is designed to evoke the historic character and elements reminiscent of some of the country's older stadiums. The press box on the concourse level is intentionally located at a slightly lower height and down the first base line so fans have an unobstructed view of the field as they enter the ballpark. The wide concourse runs from foul pole to foul pole. The ballpark was honored for its outstanding design with a New Jersey Golden Trowel Grand Design Award.

TD Bank Ballpark includes 6,100 fixed seats and additional lawn seating, by the Patriots' bullpen. Additional options include a series of hospitality suites, the Diamond Club, for company meetings and special catering services, the SK Club (formerly the Party Deck) for company outings or other special occasions, and the Ballpark BBQ picnic area that can accommodate a group of 30 to 350 fans. There is also a children's Fun Zone near the lawn seating.

Concessions at TD Bank Ballpark include traditional ballpark fare, health food and gluten-free options. The official hospitality provider is HomePlate Catering & Hospitality. The Patriots Team Store, located at the main gate, is the Somerset Patriots' official merchandise and souvenir store.

TD Bank Ballpark features 3,465 solar panels. The solar panels are expected to produce 1,140,000 kWh annually and supplement 88% of the consumption used at the ballpark. They are located in the ballpark's Red and White parking lots.

Robert Wood Johnson University Hospital has a 10,000 sq ft (930 m^{2}) physical therapy and sports medicine center at TD Bank Ballpark that also serves as the official health care provider of the Somerset Patriots.

=== Upgrades ===
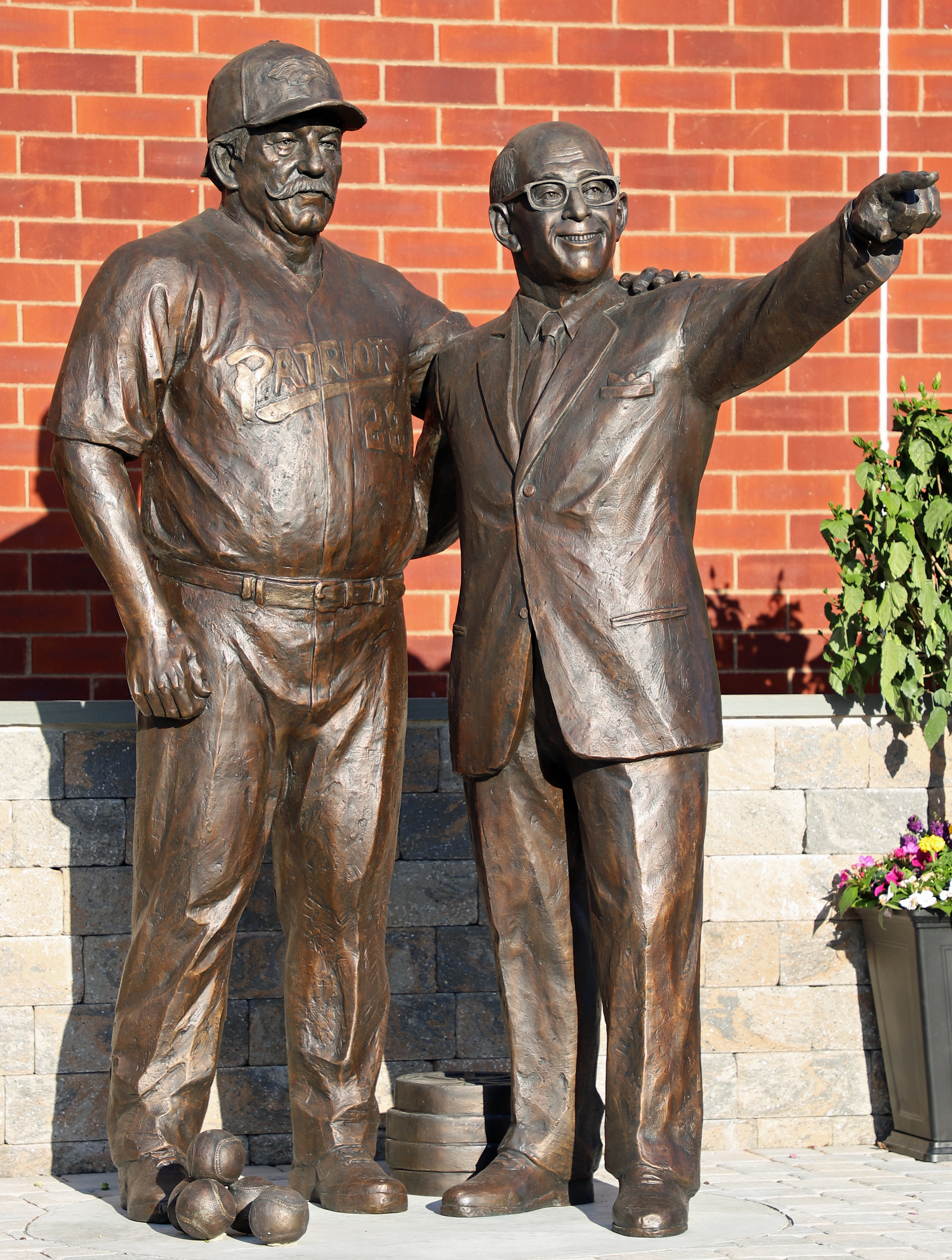
Manager Emeritus Sparky Lyle and Chairman Steve Kalafer - TD Bank Park 2021

Ahead of the 2020 season, the Patriots replaced and extended protective netting behind home plate and down the first and third base lines. The new netting is the same used at Yankee Stadium and is made from Dyneema fibers that have a special green coating that allows for 95% see through visibility from the seating bowl and is 15% stronger than steel and 40% stronger than aramid fibers. This was the second netting extension the Patriots have done since 2017.

In October 2020, a sculpture of Manager Emeritus Sparky Lyle and Chairman Emeritus Steve Kalafer was unveiled in a newly renovated area in front of TD Bank Ballpark and recreates an early picture of a conversation between Kalafer and Lyle. The sculpture was created by world-renowned sculptor Brian Hanlon of Toms River, New Jersey.

In November 2020, the Patriots were announced as the new Double-A affiliate of the New York Yankees. As a result, ahead of the 2021, 2022 and 2023 seasons, the ballpark underwent several renovations to meet the new Major League Baseball (MLB) standards for minor league ballparks.

The first phase of the renovations included several major quality of life upgrades on and off the field. Inside of the ballpark, renovations started with the demolition and cleaning of the home clubhouse which allowed for construction of a better layout and new spaces for players and coaches. A new dedicated dining and kitchenette area was built in the clubhouse area per MLB specifications. The previous gym from inside the clubhouse was relocated to a new 3,100 sq ft (290 m^{2}) gym facility built where the former maintenance yard was located. Approximately 1,000 sq ft (93 m^{2}) of the facility is used for maintenance space and storage of field equipment and materials. An additional 4,300 sq ft (400 m^{2}) multipurpose indoor facility was also constructed that features two retractable batting cages that allow for year-round training. It was built parallel to the first base gate, extending slightly into the Red parking lot. The location of the former batting cage was divided up for several new uses that include a New York Yankees video room, a dedicated female staff locker room, an umpire's locker room, an instructors locker room, a new grounds crew office and additional storage space. A new multi-camera broadcast and in-game entertainment system was also installed.

On the field, the home bullpen was moved off the playing field from right field foul territory into a portion of the existing lawn seating area and features a covered area for the players. New safety padding was added on the interior walls and outfield walls of the ballpark. New lighting was installed to make the ballpark both more energy efficient and to enhance visibility of the playing field for the team during night games. The home and visiting dugouts were also refurbished with new benches, racks and flooring.

Ahead of the 2023 season, as part of the second phase of renovations, the ballpark installed a new 1,620 sq ft (151 m^{2}) scoreboard composed of three Daktronics LED video displays that use three times more digital space than their previous one. The scoreboard can operate as one large canvas or as individual displays to show combinations of live video, instant replays, live statistics, graphics, animations and sponsorship messages. This is the third scoreboard in the ballpark's history. In late 2025, the Patriots announced that all seating at TD Bank Ballpark would be replaced in advance of the 2026 season.

== Concerts ==
TD Bank Ballpark has hosted four major concerts, including traditional pop and jazz musician Tony Bennett, country music artist Willie Nelson, pop music star Jessica Simpson, and a 50's festival including The Teenagers, The Duprees, Jerry Lee Lewis, and Chuck Berry.

== Accessibility and transportation ==
TD Bank Ballpark is accessible by mass transit via the Bridgewater station on the NJ Transit Raritan Valley Line. The station is located just beyond the center field wall and was reconstructed in 1999 in conjunction with the construction of TD Bank Ballpark, and the ballpark's White Lot is used for commuter parking.

The ballpark is accessible by car via I-287 and U.S. Route 22 with connections to I-78, New Jersey Turnpike (I-95), Garden State Parkway and other highways and roads. Parking is $5.00 and is available in three on site lots, labeled red, white and blue, where covered parking spaces are provided by the elevated solar panel arrays.

== See also ==
- TD Garden (Boston, Massachusetts)
- TD Bank Sports Center (Hamden, Connecticut)
- TD Ameritrade Park Omaha (Nebraska)
- TD Arena (Charleston, South Carolina)
