= Pittsburgh Panthers baseball =

American college baseball team

- 2026 Pittsburgh Panthers baseball team
- Founded: 1869; 157 years ago
- University: University of Pittsburgh
- Head coach: Mike Bell (8th season)
- Conference: ACC
- Location: Pittsburgh, Pennsylvania
- Home stadium: Charles L. Cost Field in the Petersen Sports Complex (capacity: 900)
- Nickname: Panthers
- Colors: Blue and gold

NCAA tournament appearances
- 1959, 1965, 1995

Conference tournament champions
- 1995

Conference regular season champions
- 1994

The Pittsburgh Panthers baseball is the NCAA Division I intercollegiate baseball program of the University of Pittsburgh, often referred to as "Pitt", located in Pittsburgh, Pennsylvania. The Pitt baseball team competes in the Atlantic Coast Conference and plays their home games at Charles L. Cost Field in the Petersen Sports Complex. It is the university's oldest recorded sport, dating to 1869. Prior to joining the ACC in 2013-14, Pitt had won both the Big East Conference regular season and Big East Tournament championships. The Panthers have also received four First Team All-American selections, and have appeared in three NCAA championships. 52 Panthers have been selected in the Major League Baseball draft.

== History ==
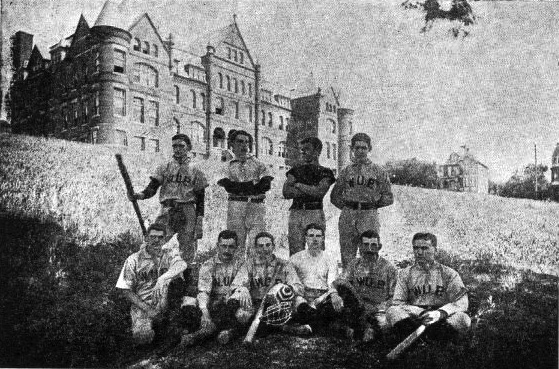
Pitt baseball circa the 1890s when the school was known as the Western University of Pennsylvania. The players are posing in front of Main Hall when the campus was located on Observatory Hill on Pittsburgh's North Side.

Baseball has been called "the first game of consequence played at the University." The first recorded game was a 21–20, five-inning win over the Eckfords of East Liberty in 1869. The team went undefeated until it lost to a high school team in 1870. Although early records are sparse and incomplete, baseball at the university continued to be played against nearby college teams, although sometimes with irregular schedules, throughout the end of the 19th century, as well as at the intramural level. The student yearbook, The Owl, noted that teams fielded between the years of 1888 to 1894 were especially successful. However, according to the student yearbook, in the early 20th century interest in college baseball at Pitt waned due to a lack of a proper field, strictness of eligibility rules, irregularity of schedules, and the rise of football as the dominant school sport. Pitt did not field a baseball team from 1918 to 1920, although the program was briefly resurrected under coach Dick Harley for four seasons which were highlighted by the play of future Major League Baseball pitcher Steve Swetonic, before the program again disappeared from 1925 to 1938. The program was reestablished in 1939 under coach Ralph Mitterling who led the team for 16 seasons and guided players such as future Major League pitcher Russ Kemmerer.

In 1955, legendary Pitt baseball coach Bobby Lewis took control of the program. Lewis, who is one of two Panthers to have his baseball jersey retired by the school, led the team for 36 seasons until his retirement in 1990. During his tenure, Pitt went 438–389, garnering Lewis the most wins of any coach in Pitt athletics history to that point. Under Lewis, Pitt appeared in the NCAA baseball championship twice, and finished ranked 27th in the final 1967 Collegiate Baseball Newspaper poll. Lewis coached All-Americans George Schoeppner and Fred Mazurek, future long-time Major League professionals Doc Medich and Ken Macha, as well as other notable athletes such as Mike Ditka and Joe Walton.

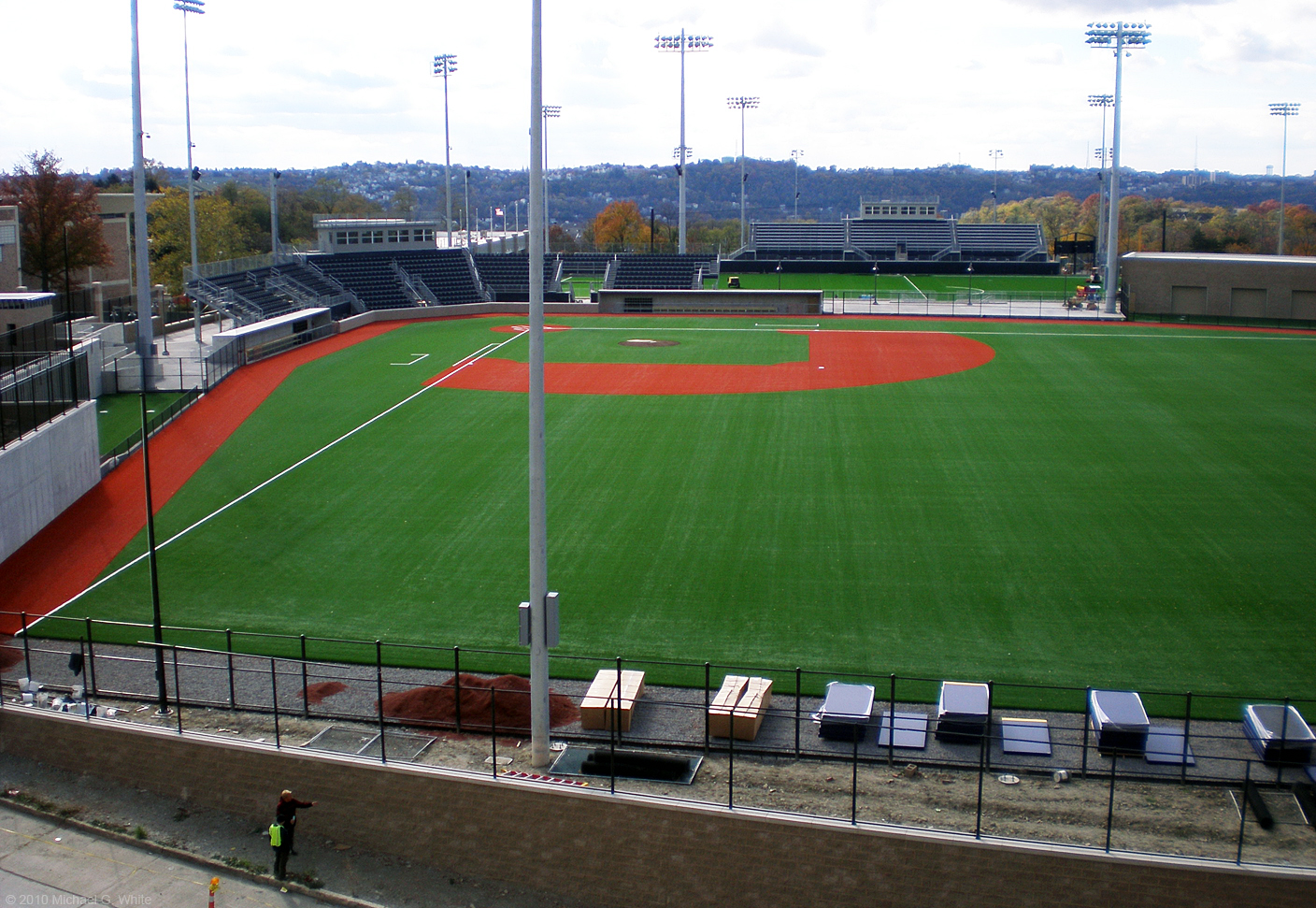
The new baseball stadium in the Petersen Sports Complex nearing completion in late October, 2010

Mark Jackson took over for Bobby Lewis in 1991 and quickly turned the Panthers into a contender in the Big East Conference, in which Pitt had begun competing in 1985. Jackson led the Panthers to a regular season Big East title in 1994, earning Big East Coach of the Year honors, and went on to win the 1995 Big East Conference baseball tournament, thus earning a bid to the NCAA Championship and finishing the season ranked 28th in the final Collegiate Baseball Newspaper poll. His teams posted five winning seasons out of seven years at the helm, including three 30 or more-win seasons. Notable players for Jackson include Jason Conti, who went on to play for five seasons in the Major Leagues, and Josh Tyler who won the 1994 Big East Player of the Year award.

One of the most successful eras of Pitt baseball began with the hiring of Joe Jordano as coach on November 15, 1997. Since coming to Pittsburgh, Jordano has had 38 players taken in the Major League Baseball Draft, 50 of his players sign professional contracts, and 36 All-Big East players. Since 2000, Jordano's teams have produced nine All-Americans, 20 All-region selections, six 30-win seasons, and six Big East Baseball Tournament appearances. Jordano earned the Big East Coach of the Year award in 2004 following a 38–18 season in which Pitt finished second in the conference standings. In 2010, Pitt went 38–18 and appeared in the Top 25 polls of both Collegiate Baseball Newspaper and Baseball America for the first time in its history, earning Jordano the American Baseball Coaches Association (ABCA) East Region Coach of the Year award and the Chuck Tanner Collegiate Baseball Manager of the Year Award. On March 2, 2012, Jordano surpassed former head coach Bobby Lewis to become Pitt baseball's all-time wins leader when he earned his 403rd career victory, a 3–1 win at Coastal Carolina.

In 2011, the program moved into a new facility, Charles L. Cost Field, in the Petersen Sports Complex, from its old facility, Trees Field. The new facilities helped to prompt Rivals.com to name Pitt as one of "college baseball's rising programs" heading into the 2011 season. Pitcher Corey Baker, who in 2010 had been named to the All-Big East First Team, and to the ABCA/Rawlings All-East Region First Team, ended his university career in 2011 as the Pittsburgh Panthers all-time career wins leader, with 24.

In the 2013 season, Pitt's last in the Big East Conference, the team set a record for the most wins in a single season (42) and became nationally ranked in the Top 25 of all five major college baseball polls for the first time in program history, including climbing as high as #16 in Collegiate Baseball Newspaper. Pitt moved into the Atlantic Coast Conference on July 1, 2013.

Jordano resigned as the head coach of Pittsburgh on June 22, 2018. Mike Bell, former associate head coach at Florida State, was hired as Pitt's head coach in July 2018.

== Pittsburgh in the NCAA tournament ==
Year	Record	Pct	Notes
1959	0–1	.000	District 2
1965	0–1	.000	District 2
1995	2–2	.500	Mideast Regional
TOTALS	2-4	.333	

== All-Americans ==
Pitt has had twelve different players selected as All-Americans, including five first team selections. In addition, two Panthers have been selected as Freshman All-Americans, and five players have been selected as an Academic All-Americans.

- First Team All-Americans

2004 P.J. Hiser, Louisville Slugger, Collegiate Baseball
2005 Jim Negrych, Louisville Slugger, Baseball America
2006 Jim Negrych, Baseball America
2009 Chris Sedon, Louisville Slugger, Collegiate Baseball
2026 Lorenzo Carrier, NCBWA

- Second Team All-Americans

1959 George Schoeppner
2009 Chris Sedon, Baseball America, CollegeBaseballInsider.com
2010 Joe Leonard, ABCA
2016 Charles Leblanc, NCBWA

- Third Team All-Americans

1965 Fred Mazurek
1994 Jon Murphy, ABCA
2002 Brad Rea, ABCA
2004 P.J. Hiser, NCBWA
2005 Ben Copeland, ABCA
2009 Chris Sedon, ABCA
2010 Joe Leonard, Louisville Slugger, Ping!Baseball
2013 Casey Roche, NCBWA
2016 Charles LaBlanc, Perfect Game/Rawlings
2024 Phil Fox, ABCA

- Freshman All-Americans

2004 Jim Negrych, Baseball America, Collegiate Baseball, Sports Weekly
2005 Robert Brant, Louisville Slugger

- Academic All-Americans

1970 Guy Caparelli, CoSIDA
1985 Joe Murray, CoSIDA
1994 Josh Tyler, CoSIDA
2011 Philip Konieczny, CoSIDA
2012 Anthony DeFabio, CoSIDA

== All-East ==
Pitt has had 34 All-East selections over its history, and one coach, Joe Jordano, was named the ABCA East Region Coach of the Year in 2010.

George Schoeppner, 1959
Robert Cuthbert, 1963
John Carlisle, 1963
Al Ricciuti, 1963
Fred Mazurek, 1965
George Medich, 1969
Ken Macha, 1972
Joe Groetsch, 1975
Rich Kline, 1981
Allen Lachowicz, 1981

Chris Jelic, 1985
Tedde Campbell, 1995
Brad Rea, 2002
Brian Spamer, 2003
Rob Brant, 2005
Ben Copeland, 2005
Billy Muldowney, 2005
Jim Negrych, 2006
Chris Sedon, 2009
Corey Baker, 2010

Cory Brownsten, 2010
Matt Iannazzo, 2010
Joe Leonard, 2010
John Schultz, 2010
David Chester, 2011
Kevan Smith, 2011
Rick Devereaux, 2012
Ethan Mildren, 2013
Casey Roche, 2013
Elvin Soto, 2013

Sam Parente, 2013
Charles Leblanc, 2016
Frank Maldonado, 2018
Liam Sabino, 2018

== Big East honors ==
Pitt has receive 69 All-Big East selections along with conference player, pitcher, rookie, and coach of the year awards. In addition, 36 Pitt players have garnered All-Big East Academic Awards and the team earned the Most Improved Team GPA award in 2008.

- Player of the Year

Josh Tyler, 1994
P.J. Hiser, 2004
Joe Leonard, 2010

- Pitcher of the Year

Nick Evangelista (co), 2004

- Coach of the Year

Mark Jackson, 1994
Joe Jordano, 2004, 2013

- Rookie of the Year

Bill Sherbondy, 1988
Jim Negrych, 2004

- Tournament MVP (Jack Kaiser Award)

Matthew Reid, 1994
Jon DeBernardis, 1995

== Major League Baseball ==
Pitt has had 60 Major League Baseball draft selections since the draft began in 1965. Since 1940, 99 total players that have been drafted or signed to professional contracts, including 60 since 2000.

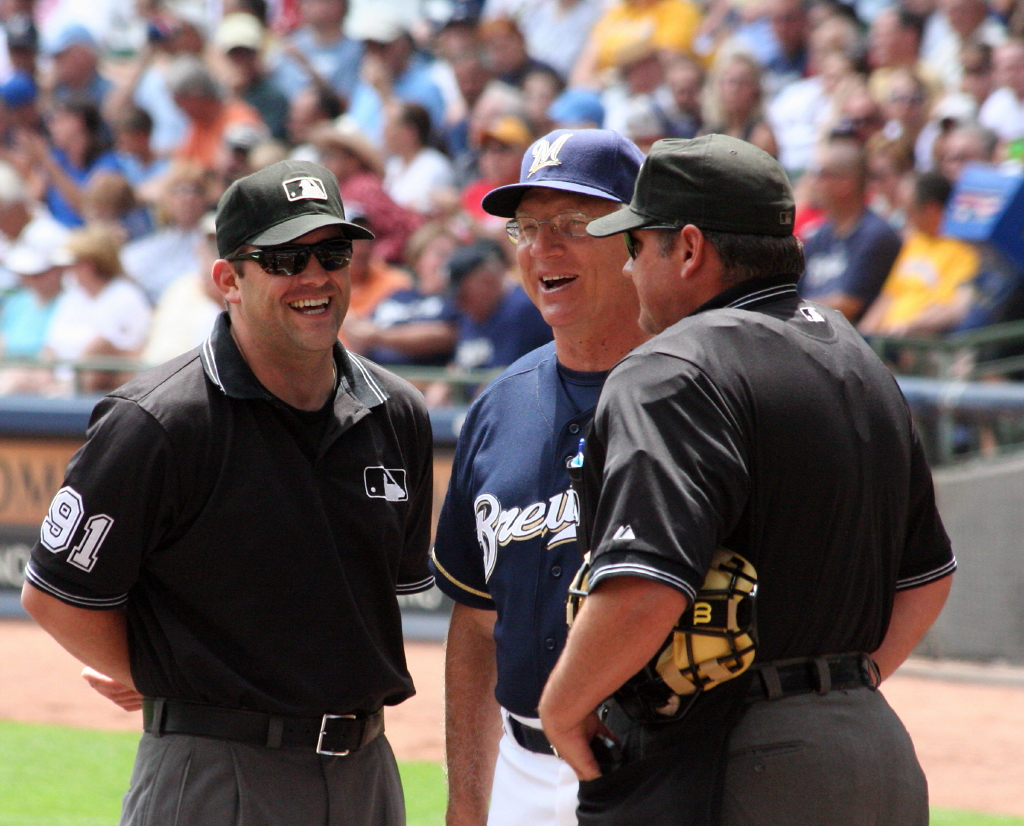
Manager Ken Macha (center) played college baseball at Pitt

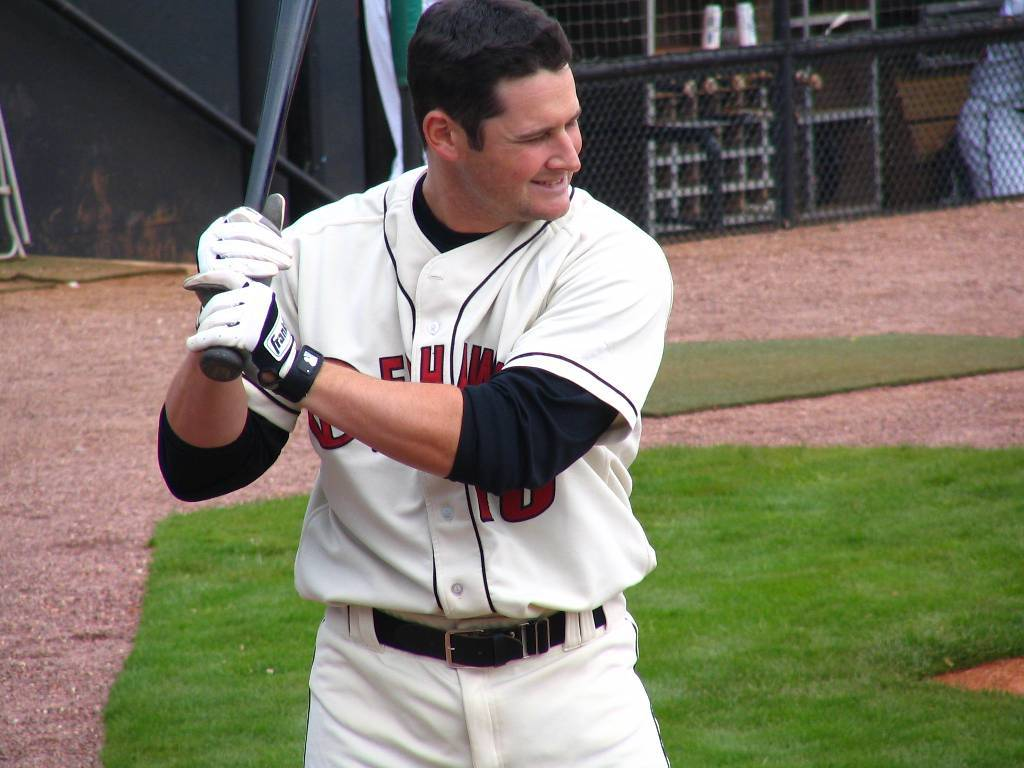
Jason Conti spent five years in the Majors with the Diamondbacks, Rays, Brewers, and Rangers

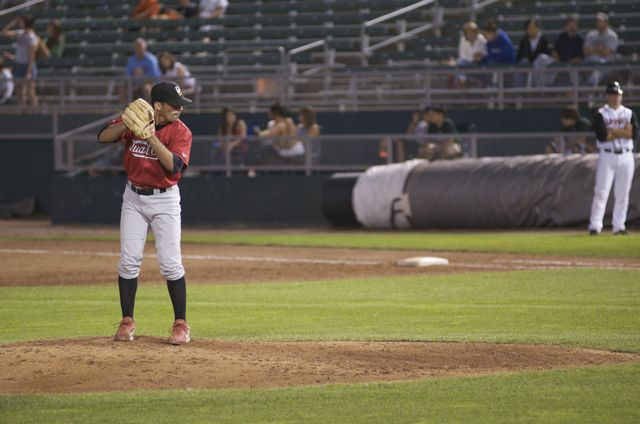
Right-handed pitcher Pete Parise went undrafted but was signed into the St. Louis Cardinals system and was named the Triple-A Memphis Redbirds 2009 Reliever of the Year

Panthers in the Major League Baseball Draft
Year	Player	Round	Team
1970	George Medich	30	Yankees
1972	Ken Macha	6	Pirates
1981	Allen Lachowicz	1	Rangers
1985	Chris Jelic	2	Royals
1986	Matt Stennett	11	Astros
1986	Chuck Scales	25	Royals
1987	David Westwood	11	Giants
1988	Frank Merigliano	16	White Sox
1989	Darnell Dickerson	28	Royals
1993	David Sumner	41	Blue Jays
1994	Josh Tyler	24	Brewers
1994	Eric Dinyar	48	Tigers
1996	Jason Conti	32	Diamondbacks
1999	Lou Melucci	26	Expos
2000	Joe Lydic	7	Astros
2000	Jory Coughenour	20	Astros
2002	Brant Colamarino	7	Athletics
2002	Eric Ackerman	16	Royals
2004	Nick Evangelista	26	Phillies
2004	P.J. Hiser	29	Indians
2004	T.J. Gornati	44	Giants
2005	Ben Copeland	4	Giants
2006	Jim Negrych	6	Pirates
2006	Bill Muldowney	8	Cubs
2006	Jimmy Mayer	30	Devil Rays
2007	Kyle Landis	18	Indians
2007	Paul Nardozzi	31	Tigers
2009	Chris Sedon	10	Tigers
2009	Nate Reed	20	White Sox
2010	Joe Leonard	3	Braves
2010	Cory Brownsten	15	Braves
2010	Danny Lopez	17	Mariners
2011	Kevan Smith	7	White Sox
2011	Raymond Black	7	Giants
2011	David Chester	33	Red Sox
2011	John Schultz	34	Marlins
2011	Travis Whitmore	35	Padres
2011	Corey Baker	49	Cardinals
2013	Ethan Mildren	12	Twins
2013	Elvin Soto	16	Diamondbacks
2013	Matt Wotherspoon	20	Tigers
2014	Luke Curtis	18	Brewers
2014	Joseph Harvey	19	Yankees
2014	Matt Wotherspoon	34	Yankees
2015	Marc Berube	28	Athletics
2015	Hobie Harris	31	Yankees
2015	Rich Condeelis	36	Twins
2016	T. J. Zeuch	1	Blue Jays
2016	Charles Leblanc	4	Rangers
2016	Alex Kowalczyk	12	Rangers
2016	Aaron Schnurbusch	28	White Sox
2016	Nick Yarnall	35	Dodgers
2017	Josh Falk	17	Athletics
2017	Isaac Mattson	19	Angels
2017	Josh Mitchell	22	Royals
2018	RJ Freure	6	Astros
2018	Matt Pidich	8	Reds
2018	Derek West	28	Braves
2018	Liam Sabino	35	Cardinals
2018	Yasin Chentouf	36	Tigers
2019	Dan Hammer	13	Orioles
2019	Derek West	14	Astros
2023	Logan Evans	36	Mariners

Other Pitt players that had Major League careers include Steve Swetonic, Robert Malloy, Russ Kemmerer, and Jason Rakers.

== See also ==
- List of NCAA Division I baseball programs
