= Seton Hall Pirates baseball =

- 2026 Seton Hall Pirates baseball team
- Founded: 1863
- University: Seton Hall University
- Athletic director: Bryan Felt
- Head coach: Rob Sheppard (23rd season)
- Conference: Big East Conference
- Location: South Orange, New Jersey
- Home stadium: Owen T. Carroll Field (capacity: 261)
- Nickname: Pirates
- Colors: Blue and white

College World Series appearances
- 1964, 1971, 1974, 1975

NCAA regional champions
- 1975

NCAA tournament appearances
- 1949, 1964, 1970, 1971, 1973, 1974, 1975, 1976, 1977, 1979, 1982, 1984, 1987, 2000, 2001, 2011

Conference tournament champions
- Big East: 1987, 2001, 2011; ECAC: 1976, 1977, 1982, 1984

Conference regular season champions
- 1990

The Seton Hall Pirates baseball team represents Seton Hall University, in South Orange, New Jersey in college baseball. The program is classified in the NCAA Division I, and the team competes in the Big East Conference. The team is coached by Rob Sheppard.

The Seton Hall baseball team has been to the College World Series four times, recorded 16 NCAA appearances, and 4 Big East Championships (three tournament and one regular season).

== Seton Hall in the NCAA Tournament ==
Year	Record	Pct	Notes
1964	3–2	.600	District II Champions, College World Series 5th place
1970	2–2	.500	District II
1971	3–2	.600	District II Champions, College World Series 7th place
1973	0–2	.000	District 2
1974	3–2	.600	District II Champions, College World Series 7th place
1975	4–2	.667	Northeast Regional Champions, College World Series 5th place
1976	3–2	.600	Northeast Regional
1977	0–2	.000	Northeast Regional
1979	0–2	.000	East Regional
1982	0–2	.000	Northeast Regional
1984	3–2	.600	Northeast Regional
1987	1–2	.333	South I Regional
2000	0–2	.000	Columbia Regional
2001	2–2	.500	Clemson Regional
2011	1–2	.333	College Station Regional
TOTALS	25–30	.455	

== Facilities ==
The Pirates play home games at Owen T. Carroll Field, an 1,800 seat stadium which has been home to the program since 1907.

== Head coaches ==
Coach	Years	Seasons	Record
Professor Gannon	1903	1	6–7
Ed Gilroy	1907–08	2	21–11–4
J. Varlin	1910	1	6–14
Jack Clark	1912	1	11–8
Bernie Stafford	1913	1	12–5
Dave Driscoll	1914–16	3	35–18
Marty Kavanagh	1919–23	5	22–16
Doc Nork	1924–25	2	6–18
Jack Fish	1926–27	2	4–13
Milt Feller	1928–30	3	14–13
Red Smith	1931–32	2	23–8
John T. Colrick	1935–36	2	11–6
Al Mamaux	1937–42	6	69–19–1
Bob Davies	1946–47	2	26–6
Ownie Carroll	1948–72	25	341–185–6
Mike Sheppard	1973–2003	31	998–540–11
Rob Sheppard	2004–present	21	578–487–4
