= Georgetown Hoyas baseball =

Georgetown Hoyas
- 2026 Georgetown Hoyas baseball team
- Founded: 1870
- University: Georgetown University
- Head coach: Edwin Thompson (6th season)
- Conference: Big East
- Location: Tysons, VA
- Home stadium: Capital One Park (capacity: 650)
- Nickname: Hoyas
- Colors: Blue and gray

The Georgetown Hoyas baseball team represents Georgetown University in the Big East Conference, part of the NCAA's Division I level of college baseball.

== History ==
Baseball is Georgetown's second oldest sport after cricket, with the first recorded game taking place in 1866, and the team formally organized and sanctioned in 1870. In 1899, Georgetown took the intercollegiate baseball world by storm, winning 18 of 20 games against college teams, beating national powers Princeton and Yale three times each and Virginia twice. The Hilltoppers reached the pinnacle of college baseball when they were acclaimed intercollegiate national champions at season's end.

Upon their triumphant return from their northern trip at the conclusion of that year, the championship team was escorted from the train station to Georgetown in a torchlight parade led by a carriage of top university officials and included students on horseback, alumni, students from the three schools, and the college band. They were greeted with fireworks once back on campus. The team was once known as the Stonewalls, and is one possible source of the Hoya Saxa cheer famous among all Georgetown sports teams. Georgetown is one of 37 NCAA Division I programs that have not made an appearance in the NCAA Division I baseball tournament. From 1987 to 2014, the Hoyas did not even reach the Big East tournament, and it was only in 2023 that they won a Big East tournament game.

== Facilities ==
Until 2000, Georgetown baseball games were played on campus at a facility south of the Leavey Center referred to simply as College Field. Play then moved to Shirley Povich Field, a 1,500 seat stadium in Bethesda, Maryland named for Washington Post sports columnist Shirley Povich.

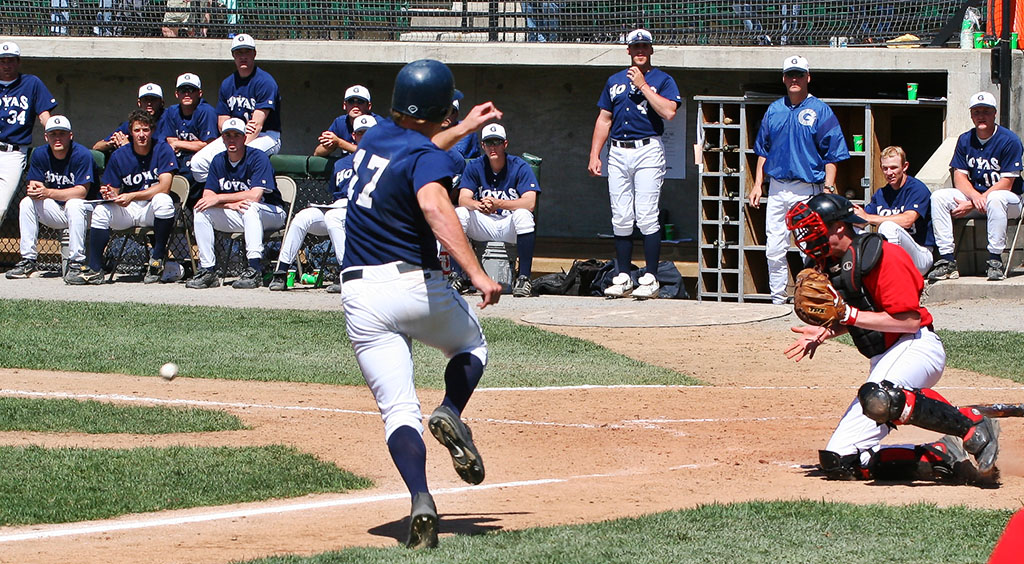
Georgetown's baseball team is the oldest on campus, having formed in 1870.

The Hoyas have played their home games at Capital One Park in Tysons, Virginia, since 2024.

Georgetown University campus baseball stadium, about 1907

== See also ==
- List of NCAA Division I baseball programs
