= Villanova Wildcats baseball =

Villanova Wildcats
- 2026 Villanova Wildcats baseball team
- Founded: 1866
- University: Villanova University
- Athletic director: Eric Roedl
- Head coach: Kevin Mulvey (10th season)
- Conference: Big East Conference
- Location: Philadelphia, Pennsylvania
- Home stadium: Villanova Ballpark at Plymouth (Capacity: 750)
- Nickname: Wildcats
- Colors: Navy blue and white

NCAA tournament appearances
- NCAA Division II; 1952, 1953, 1958, 1960, 1961 NCAA Division I 1989, 1991

Conference tournament champions
- 1989, 1991

The Villanova Wildcats baseball team is the varsity intercollegiate baseball program of Villanova University in Villanova, Pennsylvania, United States. The program's first season was in 1866, and it has been a member of the NCAA Division I Big East Conference since the start of the 1980 season. Its home venue is Villanova Ballpark at Plymouth, located 13 minutes from Villanova’s campus at 810 Germantown Pike Plymouth Meeting, PA. Kevin Mulvey is the team's head coach starting in the 2017 season. The program has appeared in 2 NCAA Tournaments at the Division I level.

== History ==
=== Early history ===
The program's first season of play was 1866.

== Villanova in the NCAA Tournament ==
Year	Record	Pct	Notes
1989	3–2	.600	East Regional
1991	0–2	.000	Northeast Regional
TOTALS	3–4	.429	

== Villanova Ballpark at Plymouth ==
Prior to the venue's construction, Villanova played on campus at McGeehan Field until 1998 and at Richie Ashburn Field from 1999 to 2002. The stadium holds 750 spectators.

== Head coaches ==
Villanova's longest tenured head coach was Art Mahan, who has coached the team for 23 years.

== See also ==
- List of NCAA Division I baseball programs
