= UConn Huskies baseball, 2000–2009 =

American college baseball seasons

The Connecticut Huskies baseball teams represented the University of Connecticut in Storrs, Connecticut, United States in college baseball at the NCAA Division I level.

== 2000 ==
2000 Connecticut Huskies baseball
- Conference: Big East Conference
- Record: 32–17 (14–9 Big East)
- Head coach: Andy Baylock (21st season season)
- Assistant coach: Jim Penders (4th season season)
- Home stadium: J.O. Christian Field

2000 Big East Conference baseball standings
	Conf.				Overall
Team	W		L	PCT	W		L	PCT
Rutgers ‍†‍‡‍^{y}	18	–	5	.783	40	–	18	.690
Notre Dame ‍‍‍^{y}	18	–	7	.720	46	–	18	.719
Seton Hall ‍‍‍^{y}	18	–	7	.720	40	–	18	.690
Connecticut ‍‍‍	14	–	9	.609	32	–	17	.653
Boston College ‍‍‍	12	–	11	.522	32	–	20	.615
Pittsburgh ‍‍‍	11	–	13	.458	31	–	24	.564
West Virginia ‍‍‍	10	–	12	.455	25	–	28	.472
St. John's ‍‍‍	8	–	15	.348	29	–	22	.569
Villanova ‍‍‍	8	–	15	.348	24	–	26	.480
Georgetown ‍‍‍	1	–	24	.040	13	–	43	.232
† – Conference champion ‡ – Tournament champion y – Invited to the NCAA tournament As of June 30, 2000; Rankings from Collegiate Baseball

=== Personnel ===
==== Roster ====
2000 Connecticut Huskies roster
Pitchers: Chris DeBrisco; Erik Drown; Pete Soteropoulos; Pat Sperone	Catchers: Clark Caudill; Brian Esposito; Infielders: Kevin Wissner; Outfielders: Cy Hess; Mike Scott; Greg Stillman	Robert Barton; Jesse Carlson; Ryan Fanning; Jonathan Gorrie; Joe Kagerer; Brian Packin; Ryan Treat; Daniel Trubia

==== Coaches ====
2000 Connecticut Huskies baseball coaching staff
- - Andy Baylock – Head coach – 21st season
- 16 – Jim Penders – Assistant coach – 4th season

=== Schedule ===
2000 Connecticut Huskies baseball game log
Regular season

February/March
Date	Opponent	Site/stadium	Score	Win	Loss	Save	Attendance	Overall record	Big East Record
Feb 25	vs Rider*		W 8–3	1–0					
Feb 26	vs Monmouth*		W 14–5	2–0					
Feb 27	vs Northwestern*		L 1–3	2–1					
Mar 3	at Troy State*	Riddle–Pace Field • Troy, AL	W 7–3	3–1					
Mar 4	vs Vanderbilt*	Riddle–Pace Field • Troy, AL	L 2–8	3–2					
Mar 5	at Troy State*	Riddle–Pace Field • Troy, AL	W 4–2	4–2					
Mar 10	at Georgia Tech*	Russ Chandler Stadium • Atlanta, GA	L 0–12	4–3					
Mar 11	at Georgia Tech*	Russ Chandler Stadium • Atlanta, GA	W 11–5	5–3					
Mar 12	at Georgia Tech*	Russ Chandler Stadium • Atlanta, GA	L 7–17	5–4					
Mar 19	Boston College	J. O. Christian Field • Storrs, CT	L 1–10	5–5	0–1				
Mar 19	Boston College	J. O. Christian Field • Storrs, CT	W 13–2	6–5	1–1				
Mar 20	Boston College	J. O. Christian Field • Storrs, CT	W 6–4	7–5	2–1				
Mar 22	at Delaware*	Bob Hannah Stadium • Newark, DE	W 6–4	8–5					
Mar 23	at Princeton*	Bill Clarke Field • Princeton, NJ	L 6–7	8–6					
Mar 25	Seton Hall	J. O. Christian Field • Storrs, CT	L 3–7	8–7	2–2				
Mar 25	Seton Hall	J. O. Christian Field • Storrs, CT	W 16–12	9–7	3–2				
Mar 26	Seton Hall	J. O. Christian Field • Storrs, CT	W 3–2	10–7	4–2				
Mar 29	UMass*	J. O. Christian Field • Storrs, CT	W 6–5	11–7					
Mar 30	at Northeastern*	Parsons Field • Brookline, MA	W 7–1	12–7					

April
Date	Opponent	Site/stadium	Score	Win	Loss	Save	Attendance	Overall record	Big East Record
Apr 1	Notre Dame	J. O. Christian Field • Storrs, CT	L 3–8	12–8	4–3				
Apr 1	Notre Dame	J. O. Christian Field • Storrs, CT	W 8–1	13–8	5–3				
Apr 2	Notre Dame	J. O. Christian Field • Storrs, CT	L 2–9	13–9	5–4				
Apr 4	Rhode Island*	J. O. Christian Field • Storrs, CT	W 5–2	14–9					
Apr 6	at Fairfield*	Alumni Baseball Diamond • Fairfield, CT	L 13–16	14–10					
Apr 8	Rutgers	J. O. Christian Field • Storrs, CT	L 7–15	14–11	5–5				
Apr 8	Rutgers	J. O. Christian Field • Storrs, CT	L 6–10	14–12	5–6				
Apr 10	Rutgers	J. O. Christian Field • Storrs, CT	W 2–0	15–12	6–6				
Apr 12	Quinnipiac*	J. O. Christian Field • Storrs, CT	W 16–5	16–12					
Apr 13	at Holy Cross*	Fitton Field • Worcester, MA	W 17–8	17–12					
Apr 15	at Pittsburgh	Trees Field • Pittsburgh, PA	L 5–18	17–13	6–7				
Apr 15	at Pittsburgh	Trees Field • Pittsburgh, PA	L 3–10	17–14	6–8				
Apr 16	at Pittsburgh	Trees Field • Pittsburgh, PA	W 8–2	18–14	7–8				
Apr 18	at UMass*	Earl Lorden Field • Amherst, MA	W 12–5	19–14					
Apr 20	Villanova	J. O. Christian Field • Storrs, CT	W 2–1	20–14	8–8				
Apr 20	Villanova	J. O. Christian Field • Storrs, CT	W 3–2	21–14	9–8				
Apr 24	C. W. Post*	J. O. Christian Field • Storrs, CT	W 4–1	22–14					
Apr 27	Fairfield*	J. O. Christian Field • Storrs, CT	W 8–2	23–14					
Apr 29	at West Virginia	Hawley Field • Morgantown, WV	W 9–4	24–14	10–8				
Apr 29	at West Virginia	Hawley Field • Morgantown, WV	W 9–4	25–14	11–8				
Apr 30	at West Virginia	Hawley Field • Morgantown, WV	L 3–15	25–15	11–9				

May
Date	Opponent	Site/stadium	Score	Win	Loss	Save	Attendance	Overall record	Big East Record
May 2	at Hartford*	Fiondella Field • Hartford, CT	W 8–3	26–15					
May 3	Sacred Heart*	J. O. Christian Field • Storrs, CT	W 9–0	27–15					
May 4	Central Connecticut*	J. O. Christian Field • Storrs, CT	W 20–2	28–15					
May 6	at Georgetown	Shirley Povich Field • Bethesda, MD	W 8–2	29–15	12–9				
May 6	at Georgetown	Shirley Povich Field • Bethesda, MD	W 13–2	30–15	13–9				
May 7	at Georgetown	Shirley Povich Field • Bethesda, MD	W 15–0	31–15	14–9				
May 9	Manhattan*	J. O. Christian Field • Storrs, CT	W 23–7	32–15					

Postseason

Big East Tournament
Date	Opponent	Site/stadium	Score	Win	Loss	Save	Attendance	Overall record	BET Record
May 17	Seton Hall	Commerce Bank Ballpark • Bridgewater, NJ	L 2–8	32–16	0–1				
May 18	Rutgers	Commerce Bank Ballpark • Bridgewater, NJ	L 7–8	32–17	0–2				

== 2001 ==
2001 Connecticut Huskies baseball
- Conference: Big East Conference
- Record: 26–25 (13–13 Big East)
- Head coach: Andy Baylock (22nd season season)
- Assistant coach: Jim Penders (5th season season)
- Home stadium: J.O. Christian Field

2001 Big East Conference baseball standings
	Conf.						Overall
Team	W		L		T	PCT	W		L		T	PCT
No. 12 Notre Dame ‍†‍‍^{y}	22	–	4	–	0	.846	49	–	13	–	1	.786
No. 25 Rutgers ‍‍‍^{y}	18	–	8	–	0	.692	42	–	17	–	0	.712
Seton Hall ‍‍‡‍^{y}	14	–	11	–	1	.558	34	–	23	–	1	.595
Virginia Tech ‍‍‍	14	–	11	–	1	.558	29	–	28	–	1	.509
St. John's ‍‍‍	13	–	13	–	0	.500	31	–	22	–	0	.585
Connecticut ‍‍‍	13	–	13	–	0	.500	26	–	25	–	0	.510
West Virginia ‍‍‍	12	–	14	–	0	.462	27	–	26	–	0	.509
Boston College ‍‍‍	11	–	13	–	0	.458	29	–	22	–	0	.569
Villanova ‍‍‍	10	–	16	–	0	.385	25	–	25	–	1	.500
Georgetown ‍‍‍	7	–	19	–	0	.269	17	–	39	–	0	.304
Pittsburgh ‍‍‍	6	–	18	–	0	.250	18	–	27	–	0	.400
† – Conference champion ‡ – Tournament champion y – Invited to the NCAA tournament As of June 30, 2001; Rankings from Collegiate Baseball

=== Personnel ===
==== Roster ====
2001 Connecticut Huskies roster
Pitchers: Chris DeBrisco; Erik Drown; Jeff Fulchino; Mike James; Pete Soteropoulos; Pat Sperone	Catchers: Mike Leonard; Infielders Outfielders: Cy Hess; Mike Scott	Jesse Carlson; Russ D'Argento; Jonathan Gorrie; Joe Kagerer; Ryan Treat; Michael Tripaldi; Daniel Trubia

==== Coaches ====
2001 Connecticut Huskies baseball coaching staff
- - Andy Baylock – Head coach – 22nd season
- 16 – Jim Penders – Assistant coach – 5th season

=== Schedule ===
2001 Connecticut Huskies baseball game log
Regular season

February
Date	Opponent	Site/stadium	Score	Overall record	Big East Record
Feb 16	at UNC Greebsoro*	UNCG Baseball Stadium • Greensboro, NC	L 0–2	0–1	
Feb 17	at UNC Greensboro*	UNCG Baseball Stadium • Greensboro, NC	L 1–10	0–2	
Feb 18	at UNC Greensboro*	UNCG Baseball Stadium • Greensboro, NC	L 8–9	0–3	
Feb 24	at The Citadel*	Joseph P. Riley Jr. Park • Charleston, SC	W 11–4	1–3	
Feb 24	at The Citadel*	Joseph P. Riley Jr. Park • Charleston, SC	L 4–10	1–4	
Feb 25	at The Citadel*	Joseph P. Riley Jr. Park • Charleston, SC	L 3–6	1–5	

March
Date	Opponent	Site/stadium	Score	Overall record	Big East Record
Mar 2	at Georgia*	Foley Field • Athens, GA	L 5–8	1–6	
Mar 2	at Georgia*	Foley Field • Athens, GA	L 3–13	1–7	
Mar 9	at Minnesota*	Hubert H. Humphrey Metrodome • Minneapolis, MN	L 6–13	1–8	
Mar 10	at Minnesota*	Hubert H. Humphrey Metrodome • Minneapolis, MN	L 3–6	1–9	
Mar 11	at Minnesota*	Hubert H. Humphrey Metrodome • Minneapolis, MN	L 8–14	1–10	
Mar 15	at Sacred Heart*	The Ballpark at Harbor Yard • Bridgeport, CT	W 12–4	2–10	
Mar 17	at St. John's	Jack Kaiser Stadium • Queens, NY	W 3–2	3–10	1–0
Mar 17	at St. John's	Jack Kaiser Stadium • Queens, NY	L 3–8	3–11	1–1
Mar 18	at St. John's	Jack Kaiser Stadium • Queens, NY	L 6–7	3–12	1–2
Mar 23	Villanova	J. O. Christian Field • Storrs, CT	W 8–7	4–12	2–2
Mar 23	Villanova	J. O. Christian Field • Storrs, CT	W 6–2	5–12	3–2
Mar 25	Rutgers	J. O. Christian Field • Storrs, CT	W 3–1	6–12	4–2
Mar 25	Rutgers	J. O. Christian Field • Storrs, CT	L 4–7	6–13	4–3
Mar 28	UMass*	J. O. Christian Field • Storrs, CT	W 13–11	7–13	
Mar 29	Northeastern*	J. O. Christian Field • Storrs, CT	W 10–2	8–13	
Mar 31	Virginia Tech	J. O. Christian Field • Storrs, CT	W 3–2	9–13	5–3
Mar 31	Virginia Tech	J. O. Christian Field • Storrs, CT	L 2–3	9–14	5–4

April
Date	Opponent	Site/stadium	Score	Overall record	Big East Record
Apr 1	Virginia Tech	J. O. Christian Field • Storrs, CT	W 7–6	10–14	6–4
Apr 3	at Rhode Island*	Bill Beck Field • Kingston, RI	W 7–5	11–14	
Apr 4	at Fairfield*	Alumni Baseball Diamond • Fairfield, CT	W 10–9	12–14	
Apr 7	Pittsburgh	J. O. Christian Field • Storrs, CT	W 7–4	13–14	7–4
Apr 7	Pittsburgh	J. O. Christian Field • Storrs, CT	W 3–1	14–14	8–4
Apr 8	Pittsburgh	J. O. Christian Field • Storrs, CT	W 8–4	15–14	9–4
Apr 12	at Seton Hall	Owen T. Carroll Field • South Orange, NJ	L 2–3	15–15	9–5
Apr 12	at Seton Hall	Owen T. Carroll Field • South Orange, NJ	W 9–4	16–15	10–5
Apr 14	at Boston College	Eddie Pellagrini Diamond at John Shea Field • Chestnut Hill, MA	W 10–6	17–15	11–5
Apr 14	at Boston College	Eddie Pellagrini Diamond at John Shea Field • Chestnut Hill, MA	L 8–12	17–16	11–6
Apr 16	Stony Brook*	J. O. Christian Field • Storrs, CT	W 11–5	18–16	
Apr 17	UMass*	J. O. Christian Field • Storrs, CT	L 3–11	18–17	
Apr 19	vs Manhattan*	Fuessenich Park • Torrington, CT	W 4–1	19–17	
Apr 21	at Georgetown	Shirley Povich Field • Bethesda, MD	L 3–6	19–18	11–7
Apr 21	at Georgetown	Shirley Povich Field • Bethesda, MD	L 2–5	19–19	11–8
Apr 22	at Georgetown	Shirley Povich Field • Bethesda, MD	L 2–4	19–20	11–9
Apr 24	Fairfield*	J. O. Christian Field • Storrs, CT	W 11–10	20–20	
Apr 25	at Hartford*	Fiondella Field • Hartford, CT	W 11–6	21–20	
Apr 26	Quinnipiac*	J. O. Christian Field • Storrs, CT	W 10–4	22–20	
Apr 28	West Virginia	J. O. Christian Field • Storrs, CT	L 4–6	22–21	11–10
Apr 28	West Virginia	J. O. Christian Field • Storrs, CT	L 1–2	22–22	11–11
Apr 29	West Virginia	J. O. Christian Field • Storrs, CT	W 3–2	23–22	12–11

May
Date	Opponent	Site/stadium	Score	Overall record	Big East Record
May 2	Sacred Heart*	J. O. Christian Field • Storrs, CT	W 10–8	24–22	
May 3	at Central Connecticut*	Balf–Savin Field • New Britain, CT	L 1–2	24–23	
May 5	at No. 1 Notre Dame	Frank Eck Stadium • Notre Dame, IN	L 1–6	24–24	12–12
May 5	at Notre Dame	Frank Eck Stadium • Notre Dame, IN	L 12–13	24–25	12–13
May 6	at Notre Dame	Frank Eck Stadium • Notre Dame, IN	W 19–12	25–25	13–13
May 8	Hartford*	J. O. Christian Field • Storrs, CT	W 19–8	26–25	

== 2002 ==
2002 Connecticut Huskies baseball
- Conference: Big East Conference
- Record: 28–22 (13–12 Big East)
- Head coach: Andy Baylock (23rd season)
- Assistant coach: Jim Penders (6th season)
- Home stadium: J.O. Christian Field

2002 Big East Conference baseball standings
	Conf.						Overall
Team	W		L		T	PCT	W		L		T	PCT
No. 6 Notre Dame ‍†‍‡‍^{y}	18	–	8	–	0	.692	50	–	18	–	0	.735
Virginia Tech ‍‍‍	18	–	8	–	0	.692	33	–	26	–	0	.559
Boston College ‍‍‍	15	–	11	–	0	.577	30	–	25	–	0	.545
Rutgers ‍‍‍	15	–	11	–	0	.577	25	–	22	–	0	.532
Pittsburgh ‍‍‍	14	–	11	–	0	.560	36	–	16	–	1	.689
St. John's ‍‍‍	14	–	12	–	0	.538	29	–	23	–	0	.558
Connecticut ‍‍‍	13	–	12	–	0	.520	28	–	22	–	0	.560
Villanova ‍‍‍	12	–	13	–	0	.480	30	–	23	–	0	.566
Seton Hall ‍‍‍	11	–	15	–	0	.423	25	–	28	–	0	.472
West Virginia ‍‍‍	9	–	16	–	0	.360	24	–	26	–	0	.480
Georgetown ‍‍‍	2	–	24	–	0	.077	9	–	47	–	0	.161
† – Conference champion ‡ – Tournament champion y – Invited to the NCAA tournament As of June 30, 2002; Rankings from Collegiate Baseball

=== Personnel ===
==== Roster ====
2002 Connecticut Huskies roster
Pitchers: Erik Drown; Mike James; Pete Soteropoulos; Pat Sperone; Nick Tucci	Catchers: Mike Leonard; Infielders Outfielders: Cy Hess; Tony Mallozzi; Dave Tokarz	Robert Barton; Brett Burnham; Jesse Carlson; Jonathan Gorrie; Joshua McDonald; Mike McDonough; Tyler Stefkovich; Michael Tripaldi; Daniel Trubia

==== Coaches ====
2002 Connecticut Huskies baseball coaching staff
- - Andy Baylock – Head coach – 23rd season
- 16 – Jim Penders – Assistant coach – 6th season

=== Schedule ===
2002 Connecticut Huskies baseball game log
Regular season

February/March
Date	Opponent	Site/stadium	Score	Overall record	Big East Record
Feb 22	vs Armstrong Atlantic*		L 8–9	0–1	
Feb 23	vs Georgia*		L 4–7	0–2	
Feb 24	vs North Carolina*		L 5–13	0–3	
Mar 1	at Vanderbilt*	Hawkins Field • Nashville, TN	L 5–11	0–4	
Mar 2	vs Lipscomb*	Hawkins Field • Nashville, TN	W 7–3	1–4	
Mar 9	at UAB*	Jerry D. Young Memorial Field • Birmingham, AL	W 4–3	2–4	
Mar 9	at UAB*	Jerry D. Young Memorial Field • Birmingham, AL	W 7–3	3–4	
Mar 10	at UAB*	Jerry D. Young Memorial Field • Birmingham, AL	L 9–11	3–5	
Mar 16	at Old Dominion*	Bud Metheny Baseball Complex • Norfolk, VA	W 13–5	4–5	
Mar 18	vs Columbia*	Bud Metheny Baseball Complex • Norfolk, VA	W 12–2	5–5	
Mar 23	Notre Dame	J. O. Christian Field • Storrs, CT	W 4–3	6–5	1–0
Mar 23	Notre Dame	J. O. Christian Field • Storrs, CT	W 9–8	7–5	2–0
Mar 24	Notre Dame	J. O. Christian Field • Storrs, CT	W 13–6	8–5	3–0
Mar 28	Boston College	J. O. Christian Field • Storrs, CT	W 8–3	9–5	4–0
Mar 28	Boston College	J. O. Christian Field • Storrs, CT	W 7–4	10–5	5–0
Mar 30	Dartmouth*	J. O. Christian Field • Storrs, CT	L 3–5	10–6	
Mar 30	Dartmouth*	J. O. Christian Field • Storrs, CT	L 6–8	10–7	

April
Date	Opponent	Site/stadium	Score	Overall record	Big East Record
Apr 1	Seton Hall	J. O. Christian Field • Storrs, CT	L 2–3	10–8	5–1
Apr 1	Seton Hall	J. O. Christian Field • Storrs, CT	W 5–2	11–8	6–1
Apr 2	Rhode Island*	J. O. Christian Field • Storrs, CT	L 0–5	11–9	
Apr 4	at Fairfield*	Alumni Baseball Diamond • Fairfield, CT	W 12–10	12–9	
Apr 6	at West Virginia	Hawley Field • Morgantown, WV	L 3–5	12–10	6–2
Apr 6	at West Virginia	Hawley Field • Morgantown, WV	L 7–8	12–11	6–3
Apr 7	at West Virginia	Hawley Field • Morgantown, WV	W 15–9	13–11	7–3
Apr 9	at Rhode Island*	Bill Beck Field • Kingston, RI	W 15–8	14–11	
Apr 10	UMass*	J. O. Christian Field • Storrs, CT	W 1–0	15–11	
Apr 12	at Villanova	Villanova Ballpark at Plymouth • Plymouth Meeting, PA	L 3–8	15–12	7–4
Apr 14	at Rutgers	Bainton Field • Piscataway, NJ	L 1–6	15–13	7–5
Apr 14	at Rutgers	Bainton Field • Piscataway, NJ	L 2–5	15–14	7–6
Apr 16	at Holy Cross*	Fitton Field • Worcester, MA	W 26–1	16–14	
Apr 17	at UMass*	Earl Lorden Field • Amherst, MA	L 18–19	16–15	
Apr 18	at Northeastern*	Parsons Field • Brookline, MA	W 6–3	17–15	
Apr 20	St. John's	J. O. Christian Field • Storrs, CT	L 6–10	17–16	7–7
Apr 20	St. John's	J. O. Christian Field • Storrs, CT	W 16–10	18–16	8–7
Apr 21	St. John's	J. O. Christian Field • Storrs, CT	W 5–1	19–16	9–7
Apr 23	Fairfield*	J. O. Christian Field • Storrs, CT	W 18–0	20–16	
Apr 24	Hartford*	J. O. Christian Field • Storrs, CT	W 12–10	21–16	
Apr 25	Quinnipiac*	J. O. Christian Field • Storrs, CT	L 3–8	21–17	
Apr 27	Georgetown	J. O. Christian Field • Storrs, CT	W 15–1	22–17	10–7
Apr 27	Georgetown	J. O. Christian Field • Storrs, CT	W 15–7	23–17	11–7
Apr 29	Georgetown	J. O. Christian Field • Storrs, CT	W 12–1	24–17	12–7

May
Date	Opponent	Site/stadium	Score	Overall record	Big East Record
May 1	Sacred Heart*	J. O. Christian Field • Storrs, CT	W 7–4	25–17	
May 2	Central Connecticut*	J. O. Christian Field • Storrs, CT	W 3–2	26–17	
May 4	at Virginia Tech	English Field • Blacksburg, VA	L 3–	26–18	12–8
May 4	at Virginia Tech	English Field • Blacksburg, VA	L 1–7	26–19	12–9
May 5	at Virginia Tech	English Field • Blacksburg, VA	L 4–12	26–20	12–10
May 7	Brown*	J. O. Christian Field • Storrs, CT	W 8–6	27–20	
May 18	at Pittsburgh	Trees Field • Pittsburgh, PA	L 11–12	27–21	12–11
May 18	at Pittsburgh	Trees Field • Pittsburgh, PA	L 4–7	27–22	12–12
May 19	at Pittsburgh	Trees Field • Pittsburgh, PA	W 5–2	28–22	13–12

== 2003 ==
2003 Connecticut Huskies baseball
- Conference: Big East Conference
- Record: 24–23 (10–15 Big East)
- Head coach: Andy Baylock (24th season)
- Assistant coach: Jim Penders (7th season)
- Home stadium: J.O. Christian Field

2003 Big East Conference baseball standings
	Conf.				Overall
Team	W		L	PCT	W		L	PCT
Rutgers ‍†‍‍^{y}	19	–	6	.760	37	–	22	.627
West Virginia ‍‍‍	18	–	6	.750	36	–	19	.655
No. 28 Notre Dame ‍‍‡‍^{y}	16	–	7	.696	45	–	18	.714
Virginia Tech ‍‍‍	15	–	10	.600	34	–	23	.596
Boston College ‍‍‍	13	–	11	.542	33	–	21	.611
Pittsburgh ‍‍‍	13	–	13	.500	36	–	20	.643
St. John's ‍‍‍	12	–	14	.462	29	–	27	.518
Seton Hall ‍‍‍	11	–	14	.440	23	–	24	.489
Connecticut ‍‍‍	10	–	15	.400	24	–	23	.511
Villanova ‍‍‍	6	–	19	.240	14	–	32	.304
Georgetown ‍‍‍	4	–	22	.154	14	–	33	.298
† – Conference champion ‡ – Tournament champion y – Invited to the NCAA tournament As of June 30, 2003; Rankings from Collegiate Baseball

=== Personnel ===
==== Roster ====
2003 Connecticut Huskies roster
Pitchers: Erik Drown; Mike James; Tim Norton; Joe Smeraglino; Pete Soteropoulos; Nick Tucci	Catchers: Mike Leonard; Infielders: Marc Peluso; Outfielders: Andy Harris; Tony Mallozzi; Dave Tokarz	Jeremy Balisciano; Robert Barton; Brett Burnham; Ryan Christopher; Frank Cipolla; Russ D'Argento; Timothy Dempsey; Shawn Hoggatt; Bryan Maler; Mike McDonough; Brendan McGinn; Kevin Potvin; Logan Richetti; Tyler Stefkovich; Daniel Trubia

==== Coaches ====
2003 Connecticut Huskies baseball coaching staff
- - Andy Baylock – Head coach – 24th season
- 16 – Jim Penders – Assistant coach – 7th season

=== Schedule ===
2003 Connecticut Huskies baseball game log
Regular season

February
Date	Opponent	Site/stadium	Score	Overall record	Big East Record
Feb 21	vs Birmingham–Southern*	Dudy Noble Field • Starkville, MS	W 7–6	1–0	
Feb 22	vs Birmingham–Southern*	Dudy Noble Field • Starkville, MS	L 7–12	1–1	
Feb 23	at No. 10 Mississippi State*	Dudy Noble Field • Starkville, MS	L 3–4	1–2	
Feb 23	at No. 10 Mississippi State*	Dudy Noble Field • Starkville, MS	L 2–11	1–3	

March
Date	Opponent	Site/stadium	Score	Overall record	Big East Record
Mar 7	at South Alabama*	Eddie Stanky Field • Mobile, AL	W 16–11	2–3	
Mar 8	at South Alabama*	Eddie Stanky Field • Mobile, AL	L 4–9	2–4	
Mar 9	at South Alabama*	Eddie Stanky Field • Mobile, AL	L 5–10	2–5	
Mar 15	at New Orleans*	Maestri Field at Privateer Park • New Orleans, LA	L 4–14	2–6	
Mar 16	at New Orleans*	Maestri Field at Privateer Park • New Orleans, LA	L 1–5	2–7	
Mar 17	at New Orleans*	Maestri Field at Privateer Park • New Orleans, LA	W 13–6	3–7	
Mar 18	at Southeastern Louisiana*	Pat Kenelly Diamond at Alumni Field • Hammond, LA	L 2–5	3–8	
Mar 21	at Navy*	Terwilliger Brothers Field at Max Bishop Stadium • Annapolis, MD	W 6–4	4–8	
Mar 22	at Georgetown	Shirley Povich Field • Bethesda, MD	W 6–2	5–8	1–0
Mar 22	at Georgetown	Shirley Povich Field • Bethesda, MD	W 9–5	6–8	2–0
Mar 23	at Georgetown	Shirley Povich Field • Bethesda, MD	W 6–4	7–8	3–0
Mar 25	UMass*	J. O. Christian Field • Storrs, CT	W 17–3	8–8	
Mar 26	Hartford*	J. O. Christian Field • Storrs, CT	W 8–4	9–8	
Mar 27	at Quinnipiac*	Quinnipiac Baseball Field • Hamden, CT	W 15–9	10–8	
Mar 29	Villanova	J. O. Christian Field • Storrs, CT	W 14–10	11–8	4–0
Mar 29	Villanova	J. O. Christian Field • Storrs, CT	W 14–10	12–8	5–0

April
Date	Opponent	Site/stadium	Score	Overall record	Big East Record
Apr 2	Yale*	J. O. Christian Field • Storrs, CT	W 9–6	13–8	
Apr 3	at Fairfield*	Alumni Baseball Diamond • Fairfield, CT	W 13–8	14–8	
Apr 4	at St. John's	Jack Kaiser Stadium • Queens, NY	L 2–4	14–9	5–1
Apr 4	at St. John's	Jack Kaiser Stadium • Queens, NY	W 5–3	15–9	6–1
Apr 6	at Seton Hall	Owen T. Carroll Field • South Orange, NJ	L 2–6	15–10	6–2
Apr 6	at Seton Hall	Owen T. Carroll Field • South Orange, NJ	L 2–3	15–11	6–3
Apr 10	at Rhode Island*	Bill Beck Field • Kingston, RI	W 10–4	16–11	
Apr 12	at West Virginia	Hawley Field • Morgantown, WV	L 14–18	16–12	6–4
Apr 12	at West Virginia	Hawley Field • Morgantown, WV	L 3–9	16–13	6–5
Apr 13	at West Virginia	Hawley Field • Morgantown, WV	L 5–10	16–14	6–6
Apr 15	at UMass*	Earl Lorden Field • Amherst, MA	W 20–8	17–14	
Apr 17	Boston College	J. O. Christian Field • Storrs, CT	W 5–3	18–14	7–6
Apr 17	Boston College	J. O. Christian Field • Storrs, CT	L 4–5	18–15	7–7
Apr 19	Virginia Tech	J. O. Christian Field • Storrs, CT	L 1–6	18–16	7–8
Apr 19	Virginia Tech	J. O. Christian Field • Storrs, CT	L 3–7	18–17	7–9
Apr 24	Quinnipiac*	J. O. Christian Field • Storrs, CT	W 11–5	19–17	
Apr 26	at Notre Dame	Frank Eck Stadium • Notre Dame, IN	L 2–3	19–18	7–10
Apr 26	at Notre Dame	Frank Eck Stadium • Notre Dame, IN	L 4–11	19–19	7–11
Apr 27	at Notre Dame	Frank Eck Stadium • Notre Dame, IN	L 3–6	19–20	7–12
Apr 29	at Hartford	Fiondella Field • Hartford, CT	W 5–1	20–20	

May
Date	Opponent	Site/stadium	Score	Overall record	Big East Record
May 1	at Central Connecticut*	Balf–Savin Field • New Britain, CT	W 6–4	21–20	
May 3	Rutgers	J. O. Christian Field • Storrs, CT	L 3–5	21–21	7–13
May 3	Rutgers	J. O. Christian Field • Storrs, CT	W 10–7	22–21	8–13
May 4	Rutgers	J. O. Christian Field • Storrs, CT	L 5–7	22–22	8–14
May 17	Pittsburgh	J. O. Christian Field • Storrs, CT	W 3–0	23–22	9–14
May 17	Pittsburgh	J. O. Christian Field • Storrs, CT	L 1–3	23–23	9–15
May 18	Pittsburgh	J. O. Christian Field • Storrs, CT	W 10–4	24–23	10–15

== 2004 ==
2004 Connecticut Huskies baseball
- Conference: Big East Conference
- Record: 26–29–1 (9–17 Big East)
- Head coach: Jim Penders (1st season)
- Assistant coach: Chris Podeszwa (1st season)
- Home stadium: J.O. Christian Field

2004 Big East Conference baseball standings
	Conf.						Overall
Team	W		L		T	PCT	W		L		T	PCT
No. 19 Notre Dame ‍†‍‡‍^{y}	20	–	6	–	0	.769	51	–	12	–	0	.810
St. John's ‍‍‍^{y}	17	–	9	–	0	.654	37	–	23	–	0	.617
Pittsburgh ‍‍‍	17	–	9	–	0	.654	38	–	18	–	0	.679
Boston College ‍‍‍	15	–	9	–	0	.625	32	–	27	–	0	.542
Rutgers ‍‍‍	13	–	11	–	0	.542	30	–	23	–	0	.566
Villanova ‍‍‍	11	–	14	–	0	.440	31	–	20	–	1	.606
Virginia Tech ‍‍‍	11	–	15	–	0	.423	29	–	27	–	0	.518
West Virginia ‍‍‍	10	–	16	–	0	.385	23	–	29	–	0	.442
Connecticut ‍‍‍	9	–	17	–	0	.346	26	–	29	–	1	.473
Seton Hall ‍‍‍	9	–	17	–	0	.346	17	–	33	–	1	.343
Georgetown ‍‍‍	8	–	17	–	0	.320	25	–	30	–	0	.455
† – Conference champion ‡ – Tournament champion y – Invited to the NCAA tournament As of June 30, 2004; Rankings from Collegiate Baseball

=== Personnel ===
==== Roster ====
2004 Connecticut Huskies roster
Pitchers: Jeff Hourigan; Mike James; Tim Norton; Joe Smeraglino; Nick Tucci	Catchers: Larry Day; Mike Leonard; Infielders: Dennis Donovan; Marc Peluso; Matt Untiet; Outfielders: Tony Mallozzi; Dave Tokarz	Russ D'Argento; Timothy Dempsey; Ted Garry; Joshua McDonald; Bryan Maler; Brendan McGinn; Kyle Messineo; Rich Sorois

==== Coaches ====
2004 Connecticut Huskies baseball coaching staff
- 16 – Jim Penders – Head coach – 1st season
- 14 – Chris Podeszwa – Volunteer assistant coach – 1st season

=== Schedule ===
2004 Connecticut Huskies baseball game log
Regular season

February/March
Date	Opponent	Site/stadium	Score	Overall record	Big East Record
Feb 27	at Arizona State*	Packard Stadium • Tempe, AZ	L 2–18	0–1	
Feb 28	at Arizona State*	Packard Stadium • Tempe, AZ	L 5–16	0–2	
Feb 29	at Arizona State*	Packard Stadium • Tempe, AZ	L 11–18	0–3	
Mar 6	vs Ohio State*	Harmon Stadium • Jacksonville, FL	L 3–4	0–4	
Mar 6	vs Illinois State*	Harmon Stadium • Jacksonville, FL	L 11–12	0–5	
Mar 8	vs Butler*	Harmon Stadium • Jacksonville, FL	W 8–3	1–5	
Mar 9	vs Jacksonville*	Harmon Stadium • Jacksonville, FL	W 13–12	2–5	
Mar 10	at North Florida*	Harmon Stadium • Jacksonville, FL	W 8–5	3–5	
Mar 11	vs Illinois State*	Harmon Stadium • Jacksonville, FL	W 18–8	4–5	
Mar 11	vs Butler*	Harmon Stadium • Jacksonville, FL	W 5–2	5–5	
Mar 13	vs Butler*	Harmon Stadium • Jacksonville, FL	W 10–0	6–5	
Mar 20	at Delaware*	Bob Hannah Stadium • Newark, DE	W 11–9	7–5	
Mar 21	at Delaware*	Bob Hannah Stadium • Newark, DE	W 13–10	8–5	
Mar 24	Hartford*	J. O. Christian Field • Storrs, CT	W 7–6	9–5	
Mar 25	at Quinnipiac*	Quinnipiac Baseball Field • Hamden, CT	L 1–12^{8}	9–6	
Mar 27	at Villanova	Villanova Ballpark at Plymouth • Plymouth Meeting, PA	L 1–3^{7}	9–7	0–1
Mar 27	at Villanova	Villanova Ballpark at Plymouth • Plymouth Meeting, PA	L 0–8	9–8	0–2
Mar 28	at Villanova	Villanova Ballpark at Plymouth • Plymouth Meeting, PA	L 2–4	9–9	0–3
Mar 30	Rhode Island*	J. O. Christian Field • Storrs, CT	L 5–7	9–10	

April
Date	Opponent	Site/stadium	Score	Overall record	Big East Record
Apr 2	Maine*	J. O. Christian Field • Storrs, CT	W 2–1	10–10	
Apr 3	Georgetown	J. O. Christian Field • Storrs, CT	W 5–2^{7}	11–10	1–3
Apr 3	Georgetown	J. O. Christian Field • Storrs, CT	W 11–3	12–10	2–3
Apr 4	Georgetown	J. O. Christian Field • Storrs, CT	L 0–5	12–11	2–4
Apr 6	at Northeastern*	Parsons Field • Brookline, MA	W 6–1	13–11	
Apr 8	St. John's	J. O. Christian Field • Storrs, CT	L 6–7^{7}	13–12	2–5
Apr 8	St. John's	J. O. Christian Field • Storrs, CT	W 6–2	14–12	3–5
Apr 10	Seton Hall	J. O. Christian Field • Storrs, CT	W 5–4^{8}	15–12	4–5
Apr 10	Seton Hall	J. O. Christian Field • Storrs, CT	W 4–2	16–12	5–5
Apr 14	UMass*	J. O. Christian Field • Storrs, CT	L 0–3^{7}	16–13	
Apr 14	UMass*	J. O. Christian Field • Storrs, CT	W 9–2^{7}	17–13	
Apr 15	Central Connecticut*	J. O. Christian Field • Storrs, CT	L 4–10	17–14	
Apr 17	at Rutgers	Bainton Field • Piscataway, NJ	L 1–5^{7}	17–15	5–6
Apr 17	at Rutgers	Bainton Field • Piscataway, NJ	L 3–5	17–16	5–7
Apr 18	at Rutgers	Bainton Field • Piscataway, NJ	L 0–6	17–17	5–8
Apr 20	Fairfield*	J. O. Christian Field • Storrs, CT	W 2–1^{7}	18–17	
Apr 20	Fairfield*	J. O. Christian Field • Storrs, CT	L 3–4^{7}	18–18	
Apr 22	Quinnipiac*	J. O. Christian Field • Storrs, CT	W 26–5	19–18	
Apr 25	at Boston College	Eddie Pellagrini Diamond at John Shea Field • Chestnut Hill, MA	W 8–5^{7}	20–18	6–8
Apr 25	at Boston College	Eddie Pellagrini Diamond at John Shea Field • Chestnut Hill, MA	L 6–7^{12}	20–19	6–9
Apr 26	at Virginia Tech	English Field • Blacksburg, VA	L 2–11^{7}	20–20	6–10
Apr 26	at Virginia Tech	English Field • Blacksburg, VA	L 0–10	20–21	6–11
Apr 28	at Brown*	Murray Stadium • Providence, RI	W 26–21^{8}	21–21	
Apr 29	at Hartford*	Hartford Baseball Field • West Hartford, CT	W 6–2	22–21	

May
Date	Opponent	Site/stadium	Score	Overall record	Big East Record
May 9	Notre Dame	J. O. Christian Field • Storrs, CT	L 0–4^{7}	22–22	6–12
May 9	Notre Dame	J. O. Christian Field • Storrs, CT	L 4–11	22–23	6–13
May 10	Notre Dame	J. O. Christian Field • Storrs, CT	L 8–16	22–24	6–14
May 11	Quinnipiac*	J. O. Christian Field • Storrs, CT	L 6–12	22–25	
May 12	at Pace*	Pleasantville, NY	T 5–5^{11}	22–25–1	
May 15	at Pittsburgh	Trees Field • Pittsburgh, PA	W 3–1	23–25–1	7–14
May 16	at Pittsburgh	Trees Field • Pittsburgh, PA	L 2–5^{7}	23–26–1	7–15
May 16	at Pittsburgh	Trees Field • Pittsburgh, PA	W 6–2	24–26–1	8–15
May 18	Vermont*	J. O. Christian Field • Storrs, CT	L 3–7	24–27–1	
May 19	Northeastern*	J. O. Christian Field • Storrs, CT	W 6–2	25–27–1	
May 22	West Virginia	J. O. Christian Field • Storrs, CT	L 1–4^{7}	25–28–1	8–16
May 22	West Virginia	J. O. Christian Field • Storrs, CT	W 6–5	26–28–1	9–16
May 23	West Virginia	J. O. Christian Field • Storrs, CT	L 5–6	26–29–1	9–17

== 2005 ==
2005 Connecticut Huskies baseball
- Conference: Big East Conference
- Record: 24–22 (11–12 Big East)
- Head coach: Jim Penders (2nd season)
- Assistant coach: Chris Podeszwa (2nd season)
- Home stadium: J.O. Christian Field

2005 Big East Conference baseball standings
	Conf.						Overall
Team	W		L		T	PCT	W		L		T	PCT
No. 30 St. John's ‍†‍‍^{y}	19	–	4	–	0	.826	41	–	18	–	0	.695
Boston College ‍‍‍	17	–	8	–	0	.680	37	–	20	–	0	.649
Notre Dame ‍‍‡‍^{y}	14	–	9	–	1	.604	38	–	24	–	1	.611
Pittsburgh ‍‍‍	15	–	10	–	0	.600	33	–	22	–	0	.600
Rutgers ‍‍‍	12	–	12	–	0	.500	32	–	21	–	0	.604
Connecticut ‍‍‍	11	–	12	–	0	.478	24	–	22	–	0	.522
West Virginia ‍‍‍	10	–	15	–	0	.400	25	–	30	–	0	.455
Villanova ‍‍‍	8	–	16	–	1	.340	28	–	21	–	2	.569
Seton Hall ‍‍‍	8	–	17	–	0	.320	17	–	35	–	0	.327
Georgetown ‍‍‍	7	–	18	–	0	.280	25	–	31	–	0	.446
† – Conference champion ‡ – Tournament champion y – Invited to the NCAA tournament As of June 30, 2005; Rankings from Collegiate Baseball

=== Personnel ===
==== Roster ====
2005 Connecticut Huskies roster
Pitchers: 10 - Pat Maguire - Sophomore; 11 - Brendan McGinn - Junior; 18 - John Slusarz - Junior; 19 - Nick Tucci - Junior; 21 - Rich Sirois - Sophomore; 23 - Joe Smeraglino - Junior; 25 - Matt Karl - Freshman; 26 - Jeff Hourigan - Senior; 30 - David Bodge - Freshman; 31 - Ted Garry - Sophomore; 33 - Joshua MacDonald - Junior; 40 - David Erickson - Freshman; 41 - Mike Tarsi - Freshman; 45 - Tim Norton - Junior	Catchers: 5 - Steven Malinowski - Junior; 12 - Ben Greenspan - Sophomore; 27 - Larry Day - Sophomore; 43 - Vin DiFazio - Freshman; Infielders: 6 - Austin Wasserman - Junior; 8 - David Muscatello - Freshman; 9 - Dennis Donovan - Sophomore; 13 - Matt Untiet - Sophomore; 22 - Pat Mahoney - Freshman	Outfielders: 3 - Ted O'Reilly - Freshman; 4 - Josh Farkes - Sophomore; 7 - Tony Mallozzi - Senior; 24 - Russ D'Argento - Senior; 32 - Bryan Maler - Junior

==== Coaches ====
2005 Connecticut Huskies baseball coaching staff
- 16 – Jim Penders – Head coach – 2nd season
- 14 – Chris Podeszwa – Volunteer assistant coach – 2nd season

=== Schedule ===
2005 Connecticut Huskies baseball game log
Regular season

February/March
Date	Opponent	Site/stadium	Score	Overall record	Big East Record
Feb 25	at Belmont*	E. S. Rose Park • Nashville, TN	W 10–7	1–0	
Feb 26	at Lipscomb*	Dugan Field • Nashville, TN	L 2–5	1–1	
Feb 27	at Vanderbilt*	Hawkins Field • Nashville, TN	L 0–3	1–2	
Mar 4	vs Mount Saint Mary (NY)*	McKechnie Field • Bradenton, FL	W 6–2	2–2	
Mar 5	vs Central Michigan*	McKechnie Field • Bradenton, FL	W 10–9	3–2	
Mar 6	vs Bowling Green*	McKechnie Field • Bradenton, FL	L 3–8	3–3	
Mar 7	vs Holy Cross*	McKechnie Field • Bradenton, FL	W 17–5	4–3	
Mar 8	vs Sacred Heart*	McKechnie Field • Bradenton, FL	W 8–0	5–3	
Mar 11	vs Arkansas–Little Rock*	USA Stadium • Millington, TN	W 7–4	6–3	
Mar 11	vs Memphis*	USA Stadium • Millington, TN	W 3–1	7–3	
Mar 12	vs Indiana State*	USA Stadium • Millington, TN	W 5–3	8–3	
Mar 13	vs UT Martin*	USA Stadium • Millington, TN	W 3–0	9–3	
Mar 19	at Centenary*	Shehee Stadium • Shreveport, LA	W 11–4	10–3	
Mar 19	at Centenary*	Shehee Stadium • Shreveport, LA	L 2–10	10–4	
Mar 20	at Centenary*	Shehee Stadium • Shreveport, LA	W 9–8^{7}	11–4	
Mar 22	vs UMass*	The Ballpark at Harbor Yard • Bridgeport, CT	W 9–0	12–4	
Mar 26	at Villanova	Villanova Ballpark at Plymouth • Plymouth Meeting, PA	L 0–3	12–5	0–1
Mar 26	at Villanova	Villanova Ballpark at Plymouth • Plymouth Meeting, PA	W 7–1	13–5	1–1
Mar 29	at Northeastern*	Parsons Field • Brookline, MA	W 3–1	14–5	
Mar 30	at Yale*	Yale Field • West Haven, CT	L 0–1	14–6	
Mar 31	at Fairfield*	Alumni Baseball Diamond • Fairfield, CT	W 11–6	15–6	

April
Date	Opponent	Site/stadium	Score	Overall record	Big East Record
Apr 3	West Virginia	J. O. Christian Field • Storrs, CT	W 9–2	16–6	2–1
Apr 3	West Virginia	J. O. Christian Field • Storrs, CT	L 6–7	16–7	2–2
Apr 4	West Virginia	J. O. Christian Field • Storrs, CT	W 13–4	17–7	3–2
Apr 5	Northeastern*	J. O. Christian Field • Storrs, CT	W 12–9	18–7	
Apr 6	Marist*	J. O. Christian Field • Storrs, CT	W 10–5	19–7	
Apr 9	Pittsburgh	J. O. Christian Field • Storrs, CT	L 7–8	19–8	3–3
Apr 9	Pittsburgh	J. O. Christian Field • Storrs, CT	W 2–1	20–8	4–3
Apr 10	Pittsburgh	J. O. Christian Field • Storrs, CT	L 6–9	20–9	4–4
Apr 12	at UMass*	Earl Lorden Field • Amherst, MA	L 4–5	20–10	
Apr 13	Siena*	J. O. Christian Field • Storrs, CT	L 2–6	20–11	
Apr 14	at Central Connecticut*	Beehive Field • New Britain, CT	W 6–2	21–11	
Apr 16	at Notre Dame	Frank Eck Stadium • South Bend, IN	L 1–7	21–12	4–5
Apr 16	at Notre Dame	Frank Eck Stadium • South Bend, IN	L 2–3^{8}	21–13	4–6
Apr 17	at Notre Dame	Frank Eck Stadium • South Bend, IN	L 7–9	21–14	4–7
Apr 19	Fairfield*	J. O. Christian Field • Storrs, CT	W 15–14	22–14	
Apr 20	at Army*	Johnson Stadium at Doubleday Field • West Point, NY	L 5–6	22–15	
Apr 21	at Quinnipiac*	Quinnipiac Baseball Field • Hamden, CT	L 9–13	22–16	
Apr 23	at Rutgers	Bainton Field • Piscataway, NJ	L 2–3^{10}	22–17	4–8
Apr 23	at Rutgers	Bainton Field • Piscataway, NJ	W 7–6	23–17	5–8
Apr 24	at Rutgers	Bainton Field • Piscataway, NJ	W 18–6	24–17	6–8
Apr 26	at Hartford*	Hartford Baseball Field • West Hartford, CT	W 20–2	25–17	
Apr 28	at Manhattan*	Van Cortlandt Park • Bronx, NY	W 10–8	26–17	
Apr 30	Georgetown	J. O. Christian Field • Storrs, CT	L 3–5	26–18	6–9
Apr 30	Georgetown	J. O. Christian Field • Storrs, CT	W 3–2	27–18	7–9

May
Date	Opponent	Site/stadium	Score	Overall record	Big East Record
May 1	Georgetown	J. O. Christian Field • Storrs, CT	W 5–4^{10}	28–18	8–9
May 10	at Rhode Island*	Bill Beck Field • Kingston, RI	L 3–8	28–19	
May 12	Sacred Heart*	J. O. Christian Field • Storrs, CT	W 6–0	29–19	
May 14	at Seton Hall	Owen T. Carroll Field • South Orange, NJ	W 20–8	30–19	9–9
May 14	at Seton Hall	Owen T. Carroll Field • South Orange, NJ	W 8–2	31–19	10–9
May 15	at Seton Hall	Owen T. Carroll Field • South Orange, NJ	L 2–7	31–20	10–10
May 17	at Vermont*	Centennial Field • Burlington, VT	W 6–5	32–20	
May 18	at Hartford*	Hartford Baseball Field • West Hartford, CT	W 13–6	33–20	
May 20	Boston College	J. O. Christian Field • Storrs, CT	L 2–5	33–21	10–11
May 20	Boston College	J. O. Christian Field • Storrs, CT	W 5–1	34–21	11–11
May 21	Boston College	J. O. Christian Field • Storrs, CT	L 1–7	34–22	11–12

== 2006 ==
2006 Connecticut Huskies baseball
- Conference: Big East Conference
- Record: 39–18–1 (18–6–1 Big East)
- Head coach: Jim Penders (3rd season)
- Assistant coach: Chris Podeszwa (3rd season)
- Home stadium: J.O. Christian Field

2006 Big East Conference baseball standings
	Conf.						Overall
Team	W		L		T	PCT	W		L		T	PCT
Notre Dame ‍†‍‡‍^{y}	21	–	5	–	1	.796	45	–	17	–	1	.722
Connecticut ‍‍‍	18	–	6	–	1	.740	39	–	18	–	1	.681
Louisville ‍‍‍	17	–	10	–	0	.630	31	–	29	–	0	.517
St. John's ‍‍‍	16	–	10	–	0	.615	40	–	19	–	0	.678
West Virginia ‍‍‍	14	–	13	–	0	.519	36	–	22	–	0	.621
Rutgers ‍‍‍	13	–	14	–	0	.481	29	–	28	–	1	.509
Cincinnati ‍‍‍	13	–	14	–	0	.481	32	–	26	–	0	.552
South Florida ‍‍‍	12	–	15	–	0	.444	23	–	35	–	0	.397
Pittsburgh ‍‍‍	10	–	17	–	0	.370	23	–	29	–	0	.442
Georgetown ‍‍‍	10	–	17	–	0	.370	24	–	32	–	0	.429
Villanova ‍‍‍	8	–	18	–	0	.308	27	–	27	–	0	.500
Seton Hall ‍‍‍	7	–	20	–	0	.259	17	–	34	–	0	.333
† – Conference champion ‡ – Tournament champion y – Invited to the NCAA tournament As of June 30, 2006; Rankings from Collegiate Baseball

=== Personnel ===
==== Roster ====
2006 Connecticut Huskies roster
Pitchers: John Folino; Tim Norton; Joe Smeraglino; Mike Tarsi	Catchers: Larry Day; Infielders: Dennis Donovan; Matt Untiet; Outfielders: Josh Farkes	Scott Beckwith; David Bodge; Dale Brannon; Ted Garry; Matt Karl; Joshua McDonald; Pat McGuire; Pat Mahoney; Bryan Maler; Steven Malinowski; Rich Sorois; John Slusarz; Erik Turgeon; Austin Wasserman

==== Coaches ====
2006 Connecticut Huskies baseball coaching staff
- 16 – Jim Penders – Head coach – 3rd season
- 14 – Chris Podeszwa – Volunteer assistant coach – 3rd season

=== Schedule ===
2006 Connecticut Huskies baseball game log
Regular season

February/March
Date	Opponent	Site/stadium	Score	Overall record	Big East Record
Feb 25	at No. 20 Florida Atlantic*	FAU Baseball Stadium • Boca Raton, FL	L 0–1	0–1	
Feb 25	at No. 20 Florida Atlantic*	FAU Baseball Stadium • Boca Raton, FL	W 2–0	1–1	
Feb 26	at No. 20 Florida Atlantic*	FAU Baseball Stadium • Boca Raton, FL	W 9–1	2–1	
Mar 3	vs New Orleans*	Vincent–Beck Stadium • Beaumont, TX	W 6–3	3–1	
Mar 4	at Lamar*	Vincent–Beck Stadium • Beaumont, TX	L 0–4	3–2	
Mar 5	vs Iona*	Vincent–Beck Stadium • Beaumont, TX	W 6–0	4–2	
Mar 6	vs Mount St. Mary's*	Vincent–Beck Stadium • Beaumont, TX	W 17–0	5–2	
Mar 7	at Jacksonville*	John Sessions Stadium • Jacksonville, FL	L 6–7	5–3	
Mar 8	vs Yale*	John Sessions Stadium • Jacksonville, FL	L 7–8	5–4	
Mar 9	vs Toledo*	John Sessions Stadium • Jacksonville, FL	L 0–2	5–5	
Mar 10	vs Duquesne*	John Sessions Stadium • Jacksonville, FL	W 11–1	6–5	
Mar 11	vs Eastern Kentucky*	John Sessions Stadium • Jacksonville, FL	W 5–4	7–5	
Mar 15	at Sacred Heart*	The Ballpark at Harbor Yard • Bridgeport, CT	W 20–1	8–5	
Mar 17	at South Florida	USF Baseball Stadium • Tampa, FL	L 3–4	8–6	0–1
Mar 18	at South Florida	USF Baseball Stadium • Tampa, FL	W 7–6^{11}	9–6	1–1
Mar 19	at South Florida	USF Baseball Stadium • Tampa, FL	L 3–4	9–7	1–2
Mar 22	at Quinnipiac*	Quinnipiac Baseball Field • Hamden, CT	L 3–4	9–8	
Mar 24	Bearcats	J. O. Christian Field • Storrs, CT	W 13–1	10–8	2–2
Mar 25	Cincinnati	J. O. Christian Field • Storrs, CT	W 6–5	11–8	3–2
Mar 26	Cincinnati	J. O. Christian Field • Storrs, CT	W 3–2	12–8	4–2
Mar 28	at Fairfield*	Alumni Baseball Diamond • Fairfield, CT	W 5–3	13–8	
Mar 29	Yale*	J. O. Christian Field • Storrs, CT	W 8–5	14–8	
Mar 31	at Louisville	Jim Patterson Stadium • Louisville, KY	W 10–2	15–8	5–2

April
Date	Opponent	Site/stadium	Score	Overall record	Big East Record
Apr 1	at Louisville	Jim Patterson Stadium • Louisville, KY	L 2–3^{12}	15–9	5–3
Apr 2	at Louisville	Jim Patterson Stadium • Louisville, KY	W 11–10	16–9	6–3
Apr 4	Hartford*	J. O. Christian Field • Storrs, CT	W 4–2	17–9	
Apr 5	at Marist*	James J. McCann Baseball Field • Poughkeepsie, NY	W 19–6	18–9	
Apr 9	Villanova	J. O. Christian Field • Storrs, CT	W 1–0	19–9	7–3
Apr 9	Villanova	J. O. Christian Field • Storrs, CT	W 7–3	20–9	8–3
Apr 10	at Boston College*	Eddie Pellagrini Diamond at John Shea Field • Chestnut Hill, MA	L 5–6	20–10	
Apr 11	UMass*	J. O. Christian Field • Storrs, CT	W 7–1	21–10	
Apr 13	at West Virginia	Hawley Field • Morgantown, WV	W 6–3	22–10	9–3
Apr 14	at West Virginia	Hawley Field • Morgantown, WV	W 7–5	23–10	10–3
Apr 15	at West Virginia	Hawley Field • Morgantown, WV	W 13–8	24–10	11–3
Apr 17	at Siena*	Siena Baseball Field • Loudonville, NY	L 8–9	24–11	
Apr 18	at Hartford*	Hartford Baseball Field • West Hartford, CT	L 1–3	24–12	
Apr 21	at St. John's	Jack Kaiser Stadium • Queens, NY	W 6–3	25–12	12–3
Apr 22	at St. John's	Jack Kaiser Stadium • Queens, NY	W 4–2	26–12	13–3
Apr 25	Fairfield*	J. O. Christian Field • Storrs, CT	L 4–5	26–13	
Apr 26	Hartford*	J. O. Christian Field • Storrs, CT	W 15–3	27–13	
Apr 27	Central Connecticut*	J. O. Christian Field • Storrs, CT	W 14–13	28–13	
Apr 29	No. 8 Notre Dame	J. O. Christian Field • Storrs, CT	L 6–7	28–14	13–4
Apr 29	No. 8 Notre Dame	J. O. Christian Field • Storrs, CT	L 3–7^{10}	28–15	13–5
Apr 30	No. 8 Notre Dame	J. O. Christian Field • Storrs, CT	T 1–1^{13}	28–15–1	13–5–1

May
Date	Opponent	Site/stadium	Score	Overall record	Big East Record
May 8	at Hofstra*	University Field • Hempstead, NY	W 9–4	29–15–1	
May 9	at UMass*	Earl Lorden Field • Amherst, MA	W 12–1	30–15–1	
May 10	Northeastern*	J. O. Christian Field • Storrs, CT	W 7–1	31–15–1	
May 12	at Pittsburgh	Trees Field • Pittsburgh, PA	W 5–4^{10}	32–15–1	14–5–1
May 13	at Pittsburgh	Trees Field • Pittsburgh, PA	W 6–4	33–15–1	15–5–1
May 14	at Pittsburgh	Trees Field • Pittsburgh, PA	L 9–11	33–16–1	15–6–1
May 17	Rhode Island*	J. O. Christian Field • Storrs, CT	W 9–5^{7}	34–16–1	
May 17	Rhode Island*	J. O. Christian Field • Storrs, CT	W 3–2^{8}	35–16–1	
May 18	Rutgers	J. O. Christian Field • Storrs, CT	W 11–7	36–16–1	16–6–1
May 19	Rutgers	J. O. Christian Field • Storrs, CT	W 7–4	37–16–1	17–6–1
May 20	Rutgers	J. O. Christian Field • Storrs, CT	W 10–1	38–16–1	18–6–1

Postseason

Big East Tournament
Date	Opponent	Site/stadium	Score	Overall record	BET Record
May 23	Cincinnati	Bright House Field • Clearwater, FL	W 6–2	39–16–1	1–0
May 24	Louisville	Bright House Field • Clearwater, FL	L 10–12	39–17–1	1–1
May 25	Rutgers	Bright House Field • Clearwater, FL	L 5–9	39–18–1	1–2

== 2007 ==
2007 Connecticut Huskies baseball
- Conference: Big East Conference
- Record: 34–27 (10–14 Big East)
- Head coach: Jim Penders (4th season)
- Assistant coaches: Justin Blood (1st season); Chris Podeszwa (4th season)
- Home stadium: J.O. Christian Field

2007 Big East Conference baseball standings
	Conf.				Overall
Team	W		L	PCT	W		L	PCT
St. John's ‍†‍‍^{y}	20	–	7	.741	41	–	19	.683
No. 30 Rutgers ‍†‍‡‍^{y}	20	–	7	.741	42	–	21	.667
Louisville ‍‍‍^{y}	19	–	8	.704	47	–	24	.662
Pittsburgh ‍‍‍	15	–	11	.577	27	–	27	.500
South Florida ‍‍‍	13	–	14	.481	34	–	26	.567
Villanova ‍‍‍	12	–	15	.444	29	–	25	.537
Notre Dame ‍‍‍	11	–	15	.423	28	–	28	.500
Connecticut ‍‍‍	10	–	14	.417	34	–	27	.557
West Virginia ‍‍‍	10	–	16	.385	29	–	22	.569
Cincinnati ‍‍‍	10	–	16	.385	28	–	28	.500
Seton Hall ‍‍‍	9	–	15	.375	25	–	25	.500
Georgetown ‍‍‍	8	–	19	.296	21	–	34	.382
† – Conference champion ‡ – Tournament champion y – Invited to the NCAA tournament As of June 30, 2007; Rankings from Collegiate Baseball

=== Personnel ===
==== Roster ====
2007 Connecticut Huskies roster
Pitchers: Trent Delazzer; David Erickson; John Folino; Mike Tarsi	Catchers: Larry Day; Infielders: Dennis Donovan; Matt Untiet; Outfielders: Josh Farkes	Dennis Accomando; David Bodge; Dale Brannon; Harold Brantley Jr.; Matt Burnett; Mike Dwyer; Pter Fatse; Ted Garry; Doug Jennings; Matt Karl; Jason Kitchen; Pat Mahoney; Brendan McGinn; Will Musson; Greg Nappo; Ted O'Reilly; Dusty Odenbach; Brad Olt; David Ploof; Rich Sorois; Gordon Stevens; Erik Turgeon; Robert Van Woert

==== Coaches ====
2007 Connecticut Huskies baseball coaching staff
- 16 – Jim Penders – Head coach – 4th season
- 15 – Justin Blood – Associate head coach/recruiting coordinator – 2nd season
- 14 – Chris Podeszwa – Volunteer assistant coach – 4th season

=== Schedule ===
2007 Connecticut Huskies baseball game log
Regular season

February/March
Date	Opponent	Site/stadium	Score	Win	Loss	Save	Attendance	Overall record	Big East Record
Feb 23	at Western Carolina*	Hennon Stadium • Cullowhee, NC	L 5–16	0–1					
Feb 24	at Western Carolina*	Hennon Stadium • Cullowhee, NC	W 8–1	1–1					
Feb 25	at Western Carolina*	Hennon Stadium • Cullowhee, NC	L 1–12	1–2					
Mar 2	at South Alabama*	Eddie Stanky Field • Mobile, AL	L 1–12	1–3					
Mar 3	at South Alabama*	Eddie Stanky Field • Mobile, AL	L 5–10	1–4					
Mar 4	at South Alabama*	Eddie Stanky Field • Mobile, AL	L 2–11	1–5					
Mar 6	vs Western Michigan*	Harmon Stadium • Jacksonville, FL	W 6–4^{13}	2–5					
Mar 7	at Jacksonville*	John Sessions Stadium • Jacksonville, FL	L 1–7	2–6					
Mar 8	vs Western Michigan*	Harmon Stadium • Jacksonville, FL	L 3–11	2–7					
Mar 9	at Jacksonville*	John Sessions Stadium • Jacksonville, FL	L 4–5	2–8					
Mar 10	at North Florida*	Harmon Stadium • Jacksonville, FL	W 9–7	3–8					
Mar 11	vs Ohio State*	Harmon Stadium • Jacksonville, FL	L 1–2	3–9					
Mar 14	at Sacred Heart*	The Ballpark at Harbor Yard • Bridgeport, CT	W 8–4	4–9					
Mar 21	vs Iona*	Baseball Heaven • Yaphank, NY	W 4–0	5–9					
Mar 22	vs NYIT*	Houlihan Stadium • Bronx, NY	W 12–3	6–9					
Mar 23	St. John's (Note: The Huskies series against St. John's was originally scheduled to be played in Storrs, CT, but poor field conditions forced a move to New York. UConn remained the home team, despite playing at St. John's.)	Jack Kaiser Stadium • Queens, NY	W 4–3	7–9	1–0				
Mar 24	St. John's	Jack Kaiser Stadium • Queens, NY	W 10–7	8–9	2–0				
Mar 25	St. John's	Jack Kaiser Stadium • Queens, NY	L 7–10	8–10	2–1				
Mar 27	at Fairfield*	Alumni Baseball Diamond • Fairfield, CT	W 8–2	9–10					
Mar 28	at Yale*	Yale Field • New Haven, CT	W 18–7	10–10					
Mar 30	South Florida	J. O. Christian Field • Storrs, CT	L 1–16	10–11	2–2				
Mar 31	South Florida	J. O. Christian Field • Storrs, CT	L 0–3	10–12	2–3				

April
Date	Opponent	Site/stadium	Score	Win	Loss	Save	Attendance	Overall record	Big East Record
Apr 1	South Florida	J. O. Christian Field • Storrs, CT	W 6–2	11–12	3–3				
Apr 2	Boston College*	J. O. Christian Field • Storrs, CT	W 4–2	12–12					
Apr 3	at Hartford*	Hartford Baseball Field • West Hartford, CT	W 3–1	13–12					
Apr 5	at Rutgers*	Bainton Field • Piscataway, NJ	L 4–9	13–13	3–4				
Apr 6	at Rutgers*	Bainton Field • Piscataway, NJ	L 5–14	13–14	3–5				
Apr 7	at Rutgers*	Bainton Field • Piscataway, NJ	L 10–12	13–15	3–6				
Apr 10	UMass*	J. O. Christian Field • Storrs, CT	L 4–6^{10}	13–16					
Apr 11	Rhode Island*	J. O. Christian Field • Storrs, CT	W 4–1	14–16					
Apr 13	Louisville	J. O. Christian Field • Storrs, CT	L 2–6	14–17	3–7				
Apr 14	Louisville	J. O. Christian Field • Storrs, CT	L 0–5	14–18	3–8				
Apr 14	Louisville	J. O. Christian Field • Storrs, CT	W 4–1	15–18	4–8				
Apr 17	Hartford*	J. O. Christian Field • Storrs, CT	W 5–3	16–18					
Apr 18	Brown*	J. O. Christian Field • Storrs, CT	W 6–5	17–18					
Apr 20	at Cincinnati	Marge Schott Stadium • Cincinnati, OH	W 6–4	18–18	5–8				
Apr 21	at Cincinnati	Marge Schott Stadium • Cincinnati, OH	L 1–6	18–19	5–9				
Apr 22	at Cincinnati	Marge Schott Stadium • Cincinnati, OH	L 2–6	18–20	5–10				
Apr 23	Siena*	J. O. Christian Field • Storrs, CT	W 8–5	19–20					
Apr 24	Fairfield*	J. O. Christian Field • Storrs, CT	W 8–0	20–20					
Apr 25	at Rhode Island*	Bill Beck Field • Kingston, RI	L 0–4	20–21					
Apr 27	Georgetown	J. O. Christian Field • Storrs, CT	L 1–10	20–22	5–11				
Apr 28	Georgetown	J. O. Christian Field • Storrs, CT	W 4–1	21–22	6–11				
Apr 29	Georgetown	J. O. Christian Field • Storrs, CT	L 2–5	21–23	6–12				

May
Date	Opponent	Site/stadium	Score	Win	Loss	Save	Attendance	Overall record	Big East Record
May 7	at Northeastern*	Parsons Field • Brookline, MA	W 8–7	22–23					
May 8	at UMass*	Earl Lorden Field • Amherst, MA	W 8–5	23–23					
May 9	at Central Connecticut*	Beehive Field • New Britain, CT	W 13–4	24–23					
May 11	West Virginia	J. O. Christian Field • Storrs, CT	W 5–0	25–23	7–12				
May 12	West Virginia	J. O. Christian Field • Storrs, CT	L 0–14	25–24	7–13				
May 13	West Virginia	J. O. Christian Field • Storrs, CT	W 2–0	26–24	8–13				
May 14	Marist*	J. O. Christian Field • Storrs, CT	W 10–8	27–24					
May 15	at Vermont*	Centennial Field • Burlington, VT	W 12–10	28–24					
May 17	at Notre Dame	Frank Eck Stadium • South Bend, IN	W 5–0	29–24	9–13				
May 18	at Notre Dame	Frank Eck Stadium • South Bend, IN	L 4–5	29–25	9–14				
May 19	at Notre Dame	Frank Eck Stadium • South Bend, IN	W 7–6	30–25	10–14				

Postseason

Big East Tournament
Date	Opponent	Site/stadium	Score	Win	Loss	Save	Attendance	Overall record	BET Record
May 22	St. John's	KeySpan Park • Brooklyn, NY	L 1–2	30–26	0–1				
May 23	Pittsburgh	KeySpan Park • Brooklyn, NY	W 5–2	31–26	1–1				
May 24	St. John's	KeySpan Park • Brooklyn, NY	W 8–7	32–26	2–1				
May 25	South Florida	KeySpan Park • Brooklyn, NY	W 3–0	33–26	3–1				
May 25	South Florida	KeySpan Park • Brooklyn, NY	W 2–0	34–26	4–1				
May 26	Rutgers	KeySpan Park • Brooklyn, NY	L 6–7	34–27	4–2				

== 2008 ==
2008 Connecticut Huskies baseball
- Conference: Big East Conference
- Record: 27–28 (11–16 Big East)
- Head coach: Jim Penders (5th season)
- Assistant coaches: Justin Blood (3rd season); Chris Podeszwa (5th season)
- Home stadium: J.O. Christian Field

2008 Big East Conference baseball standings
	Conf.						Overall
Team	W		L		T	PCT	W		L		T	PCT
No. 29 St. John's ‍†‍‍^{y}	20	–	7	–	0	.741	41	–	19	–	0	.683
Cincinnati ‍‍‍	19	–	8	–	0	.704	39	–	20	–	0	.661
Notre Dame ‍‍‍	16	–	10	–	0	.615	33	–	21	–	1	.609
Louisville ‍‍‡‍^{y}	16	–	11	–	0	.593	41	–	21	–	0	.661
Seton Hall ‍‍‍	15	–	12	–	0	.556	31	–	25	–	0	.554
South Florida ‍‍‍	14	–	13	–	0	.519	31	–	27	–	0	.534
West Virginia ‍‍‍	13	–	14	–	0	.481	31	–	27	–	0	.534
Villanova ‍‍‍	12	–	15	–	0	.444	30	–	28	–	0	.517
Connecticut ‍‍‍	11	–	16	–	0	.407	27	–	28	–	0	.491
Rutgers ‍‍‍	11	–	16	–	0	.407	23	–	29	–	1	.443
Pittsburgh ‍‍‍	7	–	19	–	0	.269	19	–	34	–	0	.358
Georgetown ‍‍‍	7	–	20	–	0	.259	18	–	32	–	0	.360
† – Conference champion ‡ – Tournament champion y – Invited to the NCAA tournament As of June 30, 2008; Rankings from Collegiate Baseball

=== Personnel ===
==== Roster ====
2008 Connecticut Huskies roster
Pitchers: - David Erickson; - John Folino; - Elliot Glynn; - Matt Karl; Catchers Infielders: - Pierre LePage; Outfielders	- Dennis Accomando; - Dale Brannon; - Harold Brantley Jr.; - Matt Burnett; - Trent Delazzer; - Douglas Elliot; - Peter Fatse; - Mike Hashem; - Ted Hurvul; - Doug Jennings; - Dan Mahoney	- Pat Mahoney; - Matt McDonald; - Ryan Mikalsen; - Will Musson; - Mike Nemeth; - Dusty Odenbach; - Brad Olt; - Mike Olt; - Joe Pavone; - Gordon Stevens; - Erik Turgeon

==== Coaches ====
2008 Connecticut Huskies baseball coaching staff
- 16 – Jim Penders – Head coach – 5th season
- 15 – Justin Blood – Associate head coach/recruiting coordinator – 3rd season
- 14 – Chris Podeszwa – Volunteer assistant coach – 5th season

=== Schedule ===
2008 Connecticut Huskies baseball game log
Regular season

February
Date	Opponent	Site/stadium	Score	Win	Loss	Save	Attendance	Overall record	Big East Record
Feb 22	vs No. 15 Missouri*	Melching Field at Conrad Park • DeLand, FL	L 1–7	0–1					
Feb 23	at Stetson*	Melching Field at Conrad Park • DeLand, FL	L 2–4	0–2					
Feb 24	vs Michigan State*	Melching Field at Conrad Park • DeLand, FL	L 1–11	0–3					
Feb 29	at UNC Greensboro*	UNCG Baseball Stadium • Greensboro, NC	L 1–18	0–4					

March
Date	Opponent	Site/stadium	Score	Win	Loss	Save	Attendance	Overall record	Big East Record
Mar 1	at UNC Greensboro*	UNCG Baseball Stadium • Greensboro, NC	L 6–15	0–5					
Mar 2	at UNC Greensboro*	UNCG Baseball Stadium • Greensboro, NC	L 0–1	0–6					
Mar 8	vs Air Force*	Santaluces Athletic Complex • Lake Worth, FL	W 10–6	1–6					
Mar 9	vs Ohio State*	Santaluces Athletic Complex • Lake Worth, FL	L 4–6	1–7					
Mar 10	vs Penn*	Santaluces Athletic Complex • Lake Worth, FL	W 18–0	2–7					
Mar 11	vs Penn State*	Santaluces Athletic Complex • Lake Worth, FL	W 14–6	3–7					
Mar 12	vs Penn State*	Santaluces Athletic Complex • Lake Worth, FL	W 4–2	4–7					
Mar 14	at Georgetown	Shirley Povich Field • Bethesda, MD	L 7–12	4–8	0–1				
Mar 15	at Georgetown	Shirley Povich Field • Bethesda, MD	W 2–0^{10}	5–8	1–1				
Mar 16	at Georgetown	Shirley Povich Field • Bethesda, MD	W 9–7^{11}	6–8	2–1				
Mar 18	at Sacred Heart*	The Ballpark at Harbor Yard • Bridgeport, CT	W 7–2	7–8					
Mar 20	at Louisville	Jim Patterson Stadium • Louisville, KY	L 5–14	7–9	2–2				
Mar 21	at Louisville	Jim Patterson Stadium • Louisville, KY	L 7–10	7–10	2–3				
Mar 22	at Louisville	Jim Patterson Stadium • Louisville, KY	W 12–8^{10}	8–10	3–3				
Mar 24	UMass*	J. O. Christian Field • Storrs, CT	W 4–2	9–10					
Mar 25	at Holy Cross*	Hanover Insurance Park at Fitton Field • Worcester, MA	W 10–3	10–10					
Mar 26	Yale*	J. O. Christian Field • Storrs, CT	W 4–3	11–10					
Mar 28	Villanova	J. O. Christian Field • Storrs, CT	W 12–1	12–10	4–3				
Mar 29	Villanova	J. O. Christian Field • Storrs, CT	L 2–7	12–11	4–4				
Mar 30	Villanova	J. O. Christian Field • Storrs, CT	W 8–3	13–11	5–4				

April
Date	Opponent	Site/stadium	Score	Win	Loss	Save	Attendance	Overall record	Big East Record
Apr 1	at Hartford*	Hartford Baseball Field • West Hartford, CT	W 12–6	14–11					
Apr 2	Boston College*	J. O. Christian Field • Storrs, CT	L 4–10	14–12					
Apr 3	Fairfield*	J. O. Christian Field • Storrs, CT	W 14–5	15–12					
Apr 5	Cincinnati	J. O. Christian Field • Storrs, CT	L 3–5	15–13	5–5				
Apr 5	Cincinnati	J. O. Christian Field • Storrs, CT	L 3–4	15–14	5–6				
Apr 6	Cincinnati	J. O. Christian Field • Storrs, CT	L 4–6	15–15	5–7				
Apr 8	at UMass*	Earl Lorden Field • Amherst, MA	W 13–6	16–15					
Apr 9	Rhode Island*	J. O. Christian Field • Storrs, CT	W 11–7	17–15					
Apr 11	at No. 22 St. John's	Jack Kaiser Stadium • Queens, NY	W 2–1	18–15	6–7				
Apr 12	at No. 22 St. John's	Jack Kaiser Stadium • Queens, NY	L 5–10	18–16	6–8				
Apr 13	at No. 22 St. John's	Jack Kaiser Stadium • Queens, NY	L 0–1	18–17	6–9				
Apr 14	Northeastern*	J. O. Christian Field • Storrs, CT	L 6–9	18–18					
Apr 15	Hartford*	J. O. Christian Field • Storrs, CT	W 4–3	19–18					
Apr 16	at Brown*	Murray Stadium • Providence, RI	L 10–14	19–19					
Apr 18	Seton Hall	J. O. Christian Field • Storrs, CT	L 5–9	19–20	6–10				
Apr 19	Seton Hall	J. O. Christian Field • Storrs, CT	L 3–9	19–21	6–11				
Apr 20	Seton Hall	J. O. Christian Field • Storrs, CT	W 11–5	20–21	7–11				
Apr 22	at Fairfield*	Alumni Baseball Diamond • Fairfield, CT	W 12–0	21–21					
Apr 23	at Rhode Island*	Bill Beck Field • Kingston, RI	L 4–9	21–22					
Apr 25	at West Virginia	Hawley Field • Morgantown, WV	L 1–10	21–23	7–12				
Apr 26	at West Virginia	Hawley Field • Morgantown, WV	L 11–12	21–24	7–13				
Apr 27	at West Virginia	Hawley Field • Morgantown, WV	L 3–17	21–25	7–14				
Apr 30	Central Connecticut*	J. O. Christian Field • Storrs, CT	W 8–0	22–25					

May
Date	Opponent	Site/stadium	Score	Win	Loss	Save	Attendance	Overall record	Big East Record
May 2	Notre Dame	J. O. Christian Field • Storrs, CT	W 9–7	23–25	8–14				
May 3	Notre Dame	J. O. Christian Field • Storrs, CT	L 2–8	23–26	8–15				
May 4	Notre Dame	J. O. Christian Field • Storrs, CT	L 3–4	23–27	8–16				
May 12	at Quinnipiac*	Quinnipiac Baseball Field • Hamden, CT	W 14–9	24–27					
May 13	at Boston College*	Eddie Pellagrini Diamond at John Shea Field • Chestnut Hill, MA	L 9–11	24–28					
May 15	at Pittsburgh	Trees Field • Pittsburgh, PA	W 14–10	25–28	9–16				
May 16	at Pittsburgh	Trees Field • Pittsburgh, PA	W 6–5	26–28	10–16				
May 17	at Pittsburgh	Trees Field • Pittsburgh, PA	W 7–5	27–28	11–16				

== 2009 ==
2009 Connecticut Huskies baseball
- Conference: Big East Conference
- Record: 36–24 (14–13 Big East)
- Head coach: Jim Penders (6th season)
- Assistant coaches: Justin Blood (4th season); Steve Malinowski (1st season); Chris Podeszwa (6th season)
- Home stadium: J.O. Christian Field

2009 Big East Conference baseball standings
	Conf.				Overall
Team	W		L	PCT	W		L	PCT
No. 14 Louisville ‍†‍‡‍^{y}	19	–	7	.731	47	–	18	.723
South Florida ‍‍‍	18	–	9	.667	34	–	25	.576
West Virginia ‍‍‍	17	–	10	.630	37	–	18	.673
St. John's ‍‍‍	16	–	11	.593	30	–	22	.577
Notre Dame ‍‍‍	15	–	12	.556	36	–	23	.610
Connecticut ‍‍‍	14	–	13	.519	36	–	24	.600
Pittsburgh ‍‍‍	13	–	13	.500	28	–	21	.571
Cincinnati ‍‍‍	13	–	14	.481	29	–	29	.500
Seton Hall ‍‍‍	13	–	14	.481	25	–	24	.510
Georgetown ‍‍‍	8	–	18	.308	17	–	34	.333
Rutgers ‍‍‍	8	–	19	.296	22	–	31	.415
Villanova ‍‍‍	6	–	10	.375	22	–	28	.440
† – Conference champion ‡ – Tournament champion y – Invited to the NCAA tournament As of June 30, 2009; Rankings from Collegiate Baseball

=== Personnel ===
==== Roster ====
2009 Connecticut Huskies roster
Pitchers: 2 - Michael Zaccardo - Freshman; 12 - Robert Woert - (redshirt) Sophomore; 13 - Ryan Thompson - Freshman; 18 - Dave Fischer - Freshman; 19 - Dan Mahoney - Sophomore; 21 - Elliot Glynn - Sophomore; 26 - Matt Barnes - Freshman; 30 - Ryan Mikalsen - Sophomore; 31 - Scott Oberg - Freshman; 32 - Ted Hurvul - Sophomore; 33 - Dusty Odenbach - Junior; 36 - Doug Jennings - Junior; 39 - John Folino - Senior; 40 - David Erickson - (redshirt) Senior; 41 - Greg Nappo - (redshirt) Sophomore; 42 - Kevin Vance - Freshman; 43 - Matt McDonald - Senior; 44 - Dennis Accomando - Senior; 45 - Trent Delazzer - Junior	Catchers: 5 - Joe Pavone - Sophomore; 8 - Doug Elliot - (redshirt) Sophomore; 27 - John Sulzicki - Freshman; Infielders: 1 - Tim Martin - Freshman; 3 - Dale Brannon - Senior; 6 - Nick Ahmed - Freshman; 9 - Pierre LePage - Sophomore; 10 - Peter Fatse - Junior; 22 - Mike Olt - Sophomore; 29 - Mike Nemeth - Sophomore	Outfielders: 4 - George Springer - Freshman; 7 - Harold Jr - Junior; 11 - Billy Ferriter - Freshman; 23 - John Andreoli - Freshman; 24 - Matt Burnett - (redshirt) Junior

==== Coaches ====
2009 Connecticut Huskies baseball coaching staff
- 16 – Jim Penders – Head coach – 6th season
- 15 – Justin Blood – Associate head coach/recruiting coordinator – 4th season
- 33 – Steve Malinowski – Assistant coach – 1st season
- 14 – Chris Podeszwa – Volunteer assistant coach – 6th season

=== Schedule ===
2009 Connecticut Huskies baseball game log
Regular season

February
Date	Opponent	Site/stadium	Score	Win	Loss	Save	Attendance	Overall record	Big East Record
Feb 20	vs Michigan State*	Jack Russell Memorial Stadium • Clearwater, FL	L 2–4	Moody (1–0)	Folino (0–1)	Fymier (1)	525	0–1	
Feb 21	vs Ohio State*	Jack Russell Memorial Stadium • Clearwater, FL	L 4–6	Armstrong (1–0)	Glynn (0–1)	None	347	0–2	
Feb 22	vs Northwestern*	Naimoli Complex • St. Petersburg, FL	W 10–1	Nappo (1–0)	Morton (0–1)	None	237	1–2	
Feb 27	vs George Mason*	Harmon Stadium • Jacksonville, FL	W 6–4	Folino (1–1)	Modica (1–1)	None		2–2	
Feb 28	at North Florida*	Harmon Stadium • Jacksonville, FL	W 10–2	Glynn (1–1)	Atteo (1–1)	None	431	3–2	

March
Date	Opponent	Site/stadium	Score	Win	Loss	Save	Attendance	Overall record	Big East Record
Mar 1	vs No. 30 Ohio State*	Harmon Stadium • Jacksonville, FL	L 14–21	Minium (1–0)	Nappo (1–1)	None	167	3–3	
Mar 8	vs Sacred Heart*	Chain of Lakes Park • Winter Haven, FL	L 3–4	Olszyk (1–0)	Mahoney (0–1)	None	250	3–4	
Mar 9	vs Miami (OH)*	Chain of Lakes Park • Winter Haven, FL	L 2–4	Melling (1–0)	Jennings (0–1)	None	200	3–5	
Mar 10	vs Bowling Green*	Chain of Lakes Park • Winter Haven, FL	W 21–6	Barnes (1–0)	Hangbers (0–1)	None	150	4–5	
Mar 12	vs Toledo*	Chain of Lakes Park • Winter Haven, FL	W 10–2	McDonald (1–0)	Collop (0–2)	None	175	5–5	
Mar 13	vs Eastern Kentucky*	Chain of Lakes Park • Winter Haven, FL	L 4–8	Hord (1–1)	Folino (1–2)	None	211	5–6	
Mar 14	vs Bucknell*	Chain of Lakes Park • Winter Haven, FL	L 10–11	Tracy (1–0)	Erickson (0–1)	None	100	5–7	
Mar 16	at Fairfield*	Alumni Baseball Diamond • Fairfield, CT	W 5–4	Jennings (1–1)	Robertson (0–1)	Erickson (1)	85	6–7	
Mar 17	vs Sacred Heart*	Darien High School • Darien, CT	W 7–6	Barnes (2–0)	Groth (0–1)	Erickson (2)	225	7–7	
Mar 20	West Virginia	J. O. Christian Field • Storrs, CT	L 6–7	Enourato (5–0)	Odenback (0–1)	None	120	7–8	0–1
Mar 21	West Virginia	J. O. Christian Field • Storrs, CT	L 2–12	Jones (3–0)	Glynn (1–2)	None	308	7–9	0–2
Mar 22	West Virginia	J. O. Christian Field • Storrs, CT	L 4–7	Gross (2–2)	Accomando (0–1)	None	265	7–10	0–3
Mar 24	Holy Cross*	J. O. Christian Field • Storrs, CT	W 9–3	Jennings (2–1)	Pedrotty (0–1)	Barnes (1)	108	8–10	
Mar 25	at Yale*	Yale Field • New Haven, CT	W 4–3	McDonald (2–0)	Gruber (1–1)	Erickson (3)	217	9–10	
Mar 27	South Florida	J. O. Christian Field • Storrs, CT	W 2–0	Folino (2–2)	Fontanez (1–3)	Erickson (4)	263	10–10	1–3
Mar 28	South Florida	J. O. Christian Field • Storrs, CT	W 12–5	Glynn (2–2)	Kaufman (1–2)	None	27	11–10	2–3
Mar 28	South Florida	J. O. Christian Field • Storrs, CT	L 2–5	Quevedo (4–0)	Nappo (1–2)	None	27	11–11	2–4
Mar 30	UMass*	J. O. Christian Field • Storrs, CT	W 8–1	Jennings (3–1)	Serino (1–2)	None	36	12–11	
Mar 31	at Hartford*	Hartford Baseball Field • Hartford, CT	L 4–6	Govoni (1–1)	Barnes (2–1)	None	123	12–12	

April
Date	Opponent	Site/stadium	Score	Win	Loss	Save	Attendance	Overall record	Big East Record
Apr 1	Boston College*	J. O. Christian Field • Storrs, CT	L 4–5	Belfiore (2–0)	Erickson (0–2)	None	184	12–13	
Apr 3	at Seton Hall	Owen T. Carroll Field • South Orange, NJ	W 7–2					13–13	3–4
Apr 4	at Seton Hall	Owen T. Carroll Field • South Orange, NJ	L 3–6	Cantwell (4–0)	Glynn (2–3)	None	120	13–14	3–5
Apr 5	at Seton Hall	Owen T. Carroll Field • South Orange, NJ	W 10–3	Nappo (2–2)	Dirocco (3–2)	None	200	14–14	4–5
Apr 8	at UMass*	Earl Lorden Field • Amherst, MA	W 11–9	Obert (1–0)	Eilenberg (1–3)	Erickson (5)	131	15–14	
Apr 9	at Rutgers	Bainton Field • Piscataway, NJ	W 10–5	Folino (4–2)	Beard (2–2)	None	176	16–14	5–5
Apr 10	at Rutgers	Bainton Field • Piscataway, NJ	L 2–5	Gaynor (1–5)	Glynn (2–4)	None	265	16–15	5–6
Apr 10	at Rutgers	Bainton Field • Piscataway, NJ	W 15–4	Barnes (3–1)	Law (1–4)	None	258	17–15	6–6
Apr 14	Hartford*	J. O. Christian Field • Storrs, CT	W 10–2	Oberg (2–0)	Rogers (1–5)	None	18–15		
Apr 15	Brown*	J. O. Christian Field • Storrs, CT	W 10–6	McDonald (3–0)	Burke (2–2)	None	145	19–15	
Apr 17	Georgetown*	J. O. Christian Field • Storrs, CT	W 9–5	Folino (5–2)	Adleman (2–6)	None	359	20–15	7–6
Apr 18	Georgetown*	J. O. Christian Field • Storrs, CT	W 10–2	Glynn (3–4)	Harris (2–6)	None	538	21–15	8–6
Apr 19	Georgetown*	J. O. Christian Field • Storrs, CT	L 2–5	Saris (3–4)	Nappo (2–3)	Isaacs (1)	207	21–16	8–7
Apr 20	Quinnipiac*	J. O. Christian Field • Storrs, CT	W 14–4	Fischer (1–0)	Birdsall (1–3)	None	112	22–16	
Apr 22	at Rhode Island*	Bill Beck Field • Kingston, RI	L 1–3	Graveline (4–1)	McDonald (3–1)	Demko (10)	75	22–17	
Apr 24	St. John's	J. O. Christian Field • Storrs, CT	L 5–8	Kilpatrick (2–1)	Folino (5–3)	Cole (2)	352	22–18	8–8
Apr 25	St. John's	J. O. Christian Field • Storrs, CT	L 7–8	Luisi (3–2)	Odenbach (0–2)	Cole (3)	439	22–19	8–9
Apr 26	St. John's	J. O. Christian Field • Storrs, CT	L 4–13	Cenatiempo (4–2)	Nappo (2–4)	Medina (1)	253	22–20	8–10
Apr 27	at Northeastern*	Parsons Field • Brookline, MA	W 6–4	Odenbach (1–2)	Lloyd (1–2)	Erickson (6)	23–20		
Apr 28	at Bryant*	Conaty Park • Smithfield, RI	W 17–5	DeLazzer (1–0)	Almeida (1–2)	None	121	24–20	
Apr 29	at Central Connecticut*	Beehive Field • New Britain, CT	W 9–7	Barnes (4–1)	Foster (0–1)	Erickson (7)	248	25–20	

May
Date	Opponent	Site/stadium	Score	Win	Loss	Save	Attendance	Overall record	Big East Record
May 1	at Notre Dame	Frank Eck Stadium • South Bend, IN	W 8–5	Folino (6–3)	Johnson (4–2)	Erickson (8)	1,387	26–20	9–10
May 2	at Notre Dame	Frank Eck Stadium • South Bend, IN	W 8–3	Oberg (3–0)	Dupra (5–5)	None	1,476	27–20	10–10
May 3	at Notre Dame	Frank Eck Stadium • South Bend, IN	L 4–5	Spano (1–1)	Odenbach (1–3)	None	1,738	27–21	10–11
May 8	Pittsburgh	J. O. Christian Field • Storrs, CT	L 4–7	Reed (3–5)	Barnes (4–2)	Smith (2)	415	27–22	10–12
May 9	Pittsburgh	J. O. Christian Field • Storrs, CT	W 14–6	Glynn (4–4)	Baker (6–3)	None	281	28–22	11–12
May 10	Pittsburgh	J. O. Christian Field • Storrs, CT	W 8–5	McDonald (4–1)	Kaye (3–3)	None	304	29–22	12–12
May 11	Central Connecticut*	J. O. Christian Field • Storrs, CT	W 6–3	Nappo (3–4)	Parker (0–1)	Erickson (9)	167	30–22	
May 12	at Boston College*	John Shea Field • Chestnut Hill, MA	W 3–2	Odenbach (2–3)	Dennhardt (5–1)	Erickson (10)	344	31–22	
May 14	at Villanova	Villanova Ballpark at Plymouth • Plymouth Meeting, PA	W 20–6	Barnes (5–2)	Crimmel (3–5)	Oberg (1)	291	32–22	13–12
May 15	at Villanova	Villanova Ballpark at Plymouth • Plymouth Meeting, PA	L 6–11	Strelein (5–8)	Vance (0–1)	None	511	32–23	13–13
May 16	at Villanova	Villanova Ballpark at Plymouth • Plymouth Meeting, PA	W 16–6	Accomando (1–1)	Pack (3–7)	None	629	33–23	14–13

Postseason

Big East Tournament
Date	Opponent	Site/stadium	Score	Win	Loss	Save	Attendance	Overall record	BET Record
May 19	(3) West Virginia	Bright House Field • Clearwater, FL	W 6–1	Glynn (5–4)	Enourato (6–2)	None		34–23	1–0
May 22	(2) South Florida	Bright House Field • Clearwater, FL	W 4–2	McDonald (5–1)	Sanford (5–4)	Erickson (11)		35–23	2–0
May 23	(2) South Florida	Bright House Field • Clearwater, FL	W 10–8	Oberg (4–0)	Quevedo (5–3)	Erickson (12)		36–23	3–0
May 24	(1) No. 17 Louisville	Bright House Field • Clearwater, FL	L 3–11	Zych (5–2)	Barnes (5–3)	None		36–24	3–1
