= 2006 Big East Conference baseball tournament =

American college baseball tournament

- Teams: 8
- Format: Double-elimination tournament
- Finals site: Bright House Field; Clearwater, Florida
- Champions: Notre Dame (5th title)
- Winning coach: Paul Mainieri (5th title)
- MVP: Wade Corpi (Notre Dame)

2006 Big East Conference baseball standings
	Conf.						Overall
Team	W		L		T	PCT	W		L		T	PCT
Notre Dame ‍†‍‡‍^{y}	21	–	5	–	1	.796	45	–	17	–	1	.722
Connecticut ‍‍‍	18	–	6	–	1	.740	39	–	18	–	1	.681
Louisville ‍‍‍	17	–	10	–	0	.630	31	–	29	–	0	.517
St. John's ‍‍‍	16	–	10	–	0	.615	40	–	19	–	0	.678
West Virginia ‍‍‍	14	–	13	–	0	.519	36	–	22	–	0	.621
Rutgers ‍‍‍	13	–	14	–	0	.481	29	–	28	–	1	.509
Cincinnati ‍‍‍	13	–	14	–	0	.481	32	–	26	–	0	.552
South Florida ‍‍‍	12	–	15	–	0	.444	23	–	35	–	0	.397
Pittsburgh ‍‍‍	10	–	17	–	0	.370	23	–	29	–	0	.442
Georgetown ‍‍‍	10	–	17	–	0	.370	24	–	32	–	0	.429
Villanova ‍‍‍	8	–	18	–	0	.308	27	–	27	–	0	.500
Seton Hall ‍‍‍	7	–	20	–	0	.259	17	–	34	–	0	.333
† – Conference champion ‡ – Tournament champion y – Invited to the NCAA tournament As of June 30, 2006; Rankings from Collegiate Baseball

The 2006 Big East Conference baseball tournament was held at Bright House Field in Clearwater, FL. This was the twenty second annual Big East Conference baseball tournament. The Notre Dame Fighting Irish won their fifth tournament championship in a row and claimed the Big East Conference's automatic bid to the 2006 NCAA Division I baseball tournament.

== Format and seeding ==
The Big East baseball tournament was an 8 team double elimination tournament in 2006. The top eight regular season finishers were seeded one through eight based on conference winning percentage only. The field was divided into two brackets, with the winners of each bracket meeting in a single championship game. This was the first time that eight teams were included in the field.

Team	W	L	T	Pct.	GB	Seed
Notre Dame	21	5	1	.796	–	1
Connecticut	18	6	1	.740	2	2
Louisville	17	10	0	.630	4.5	3
St. John's	16	10	0	.615	5	4
West Virginia	14	13	0	.519	7.5	5
Rutgers	12	12	0	.500	7.5	6
Cincinnati	13	14	0	.481	8.5	7
South Florida	12	15	0	.444	9.5	8
Pittsburgh	10	17	0	.370	11.5	–
Georgetown	10	17	0	.370	11.5	–
Villanova	8	18	0	.308	13	–
Seton Hall	7	20	0	.259	14.5	–

== Tournament ==
First round
1	Notre Dame	3
8	South Florida	1
4	St. John's	3
5	West Virginia	5
8	South Florida	4
4	St. John's	6
2	Connecticut	6
7	Cincinnati	2
3	Louisville	9
6	Rutgers	8
7	Cincinnati	7
6	Rutgers	13

Second round
1	Notre Dame	12
5	West Virginia	4
5	West Virginia	7
4	St. John's	12
2	Connecticut	10
3	Louisville	12
2	Connecticut	5
6	Rutgers	9

Semifinals
1	Notre Dame	1	5
4	St. John's	10	3
3	Louisville	13	—
6	Rutgers	3	—

Final
1	Notre Dame	7
3	Louisville	0

== Jack Kaiser Award ==
Wade Corpi was the winner of the 2006 Jack Kaiser Award. Carpi was a sophomore pitcher for the Notre Dame Fighting Irish.
