= Steve Owens (baseball) =

American college baseball coach

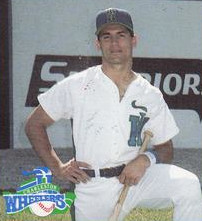
- Owens in 1988

Current position
- Title: Head coach
- Team: Rutgers
- Conference: Big Ten
- Record: 187–153

Biographical details
- Born: July 4, 1965 (age 61); Sauquoit, New York, U.S.

Playing career

Football
- 1983–1986: St. Lawrence

Baseball
- 1984–1987: St. Lawrence

Coaching career (HC unless noted)
- 1991: Ithaca (assistant)
- 1992–1999: Cortland
- 2000–2010: Le Moyne
- 2011–2019: Bryant
- 2020–present: Rutgers

Head coaching record
- Overall: 1,102–636–3

Accomplishments and honors

Championships
- 7x SUNYAC Regular Season (1992-95,97-99); 7x SUNYAC Conference Tournament (1992-95,97-99); SUNYAC East Division (1996); 4x MAAC Regular Season (2003-04,06-07); 3x MAAC Conference Tournament (2003-04,07); 8X Northeast Regular Season (2012–2019); 3x Northeast Conference Tournament (2013–14,16)

Awards
- ABCA Northeast Region Coach of the Year (2013); 5× NEC Coach of the Year (2012, 2013, 2014, 2016, 2019); 2× MAAC Coach of the Year (2004, 2006); 4× SUNYAC Coach of the Year (1993, 1994, 1995, 1998)

Stephen Owens (born July 4, 1965) is an American college baseball coach, currently serving as head coach of the Rutgers Scarlet Knights baseball team. He has held that position since prior to the 2020 season.

Owens played football and baseball at St. Lawrence and was drafted in the 25th round of the 1987 MLB draft. He played two seasons in the Chicago Cubs organization, reaching Class A. He then turned to coaching, serving as an assistant baseball and football coach at Ithaca Bombers. The following season, he earned a head coaching position with the Cortland Red Dragons baseball team, where he remained for eight seasons. He then coached at Le Moyne before becoming head coach at Bryant. In 2013, he led the Bulldogs to the NCAA tournament and was recognized as the ABCA Northeast Region Coach of the Year.

Owens has won nine conference Coach of the Year Awards. At Cortland, he was named SUNYAC Coach of the Year in 1993, 1994, 1995, and 1998; at Le Moyne, MAAC Coach of the Year in 2004 and 2006; and at Bryant, NEC Coach of the Year in 2012, 2013, and 2014.

== Coaching career ==
=== Rutgers ===
On June 26, 2019, Steve Owens was announced as the new head coach of the Rutgers baseball program, replacing Joe Litterio whose contract was not renewed.

== Head coaching record ==
This table depicts Owens' record as an NCAA head coach.

Record table
Season	Team	Overall	Conference	Standing	Postseason
Cortland Red Dragons (SUNYAC (DIII)) (1992–1999)
1992	Cortland	25–16		1st (East)	SUNYAC Tournament
1993	Cortland	21–14		1st (East)	NCAA Regional
1994	Cortland	32–7		1st (East)	NCAA Regional
1995	Cortland	30–13		1st (East)	College World Series
1996	Cortland	30–7		1st (East)	NCAA Regional
1997	Cortland	31–10		1st (East)	College World Series
1998	Cortland	40–5		1st	College World Series
1999	Cortland	36–10		1st	College World Series
Cortland:		245–82–1 (.748)			
Le Moyne Dolphins (Metro Atlantic Athletic Conference) (2000–2007)
2000	Le Moyne	32–15	18–7	2nd	MAAC Tournament
2001	Le Moyne	29–20	13–8	4th	MAAC Tournament
2002	Le Moyne	30–18	19–7	2nd	MAAC Tournament
2003	Le Moyne	33–17	22–3	1st	NCAA Regional
2004	Le Moyne	36–21	24–3	1st	NCAA Regional
2005	Le Moyne	25–22	14–11	5th	
2006	Le Moyne	38–14	21–5	1st	MAAC Tournament
2007	Le Moyne	34–19	22–3	1st	NCAA Regional
Le Moyne Dolphins (Independent (DI)) (2008–2010)
2008	Le Moyne	33–21			
2009	Le Moyne	24–23			
2010	Le Moyne	28–27			
Le Moyne:		342–217 (.612)	153–47 (.765)		
Bryant Bulldogs (Northeast Conference) (2011–2019)
2011	Bryant	30–23	19–12	4th (9) (Note: Bryant was ineligible for postseason play as they were in transition to Division I.)	
2012	Bryant	33–21	24–8	1st (9) (Note: Bryant was ineligible for postseason play as they were in transition to Division I.)	
2013	Bryant	45–17–1	27–5	1st (9)	NCAA Regional
2014	Bryant	42–16	19–5	1st (7)	NCAA Regional
2015	Bryant	29–25	17–7	1st (7)	
2016	Bryant	47–12	26–4	1st (7)	NCAA Regional
2017	Bryant	30–27	20–6	1st (7)	
2018	Bryant	32–23–1	21–7	T-1st (7)	
2019	Bryant	40–20	19–5	1st (7)	
Bryant:		328–184–2 (.640)	192–59 (.765)		
Rutgers Scarlet Knights (Big Ten Conference) (2020–present)
2020	Rutgers	6–9	0–0		Season canceled due to COVID-19
2021	Rutgers	21–23	21–23	8th	
2022	Rutgers	44–15	17–7	T-2nd	Big Ten tournament
2023	Rutgers	33–23	14–10	5th	Big Ten tournament
2024	Rutgers	28–25	6–18	12th	
2025	Rutgers	29-28	15-15	10th	Big Ten tournament
2026	Rutgers	26-30	13-17	10th	Big Ten tournament
Rutgers:		187–153 (.550)	86–90		
Total:		1,102–636–3 (.634)			
National champion Postseason invitational champion Conference regular season champion Conference regular season and conference tournament champion Division regular season champion Division regular season and conference tournament champion Conference tournament champion

== See also ==
- List of current NCAA Division I baseball coaches
