= 2008 Big East Conference baseball tournament =

American college baseball tournament

- Teams: 8
- Format: Double-elimination tournament
- Finals site: Bright House Field; Clearwater, Florida
- Champions: Louisville (1st title)
- Winning coach: Dan McDonnell (1st title)
- MVP: Chris Dominguez (Louisville)

2008 Big East Conference baseball standings
	Conf.						Overall
Team	W		L		T	PCT	W		L		T	PCT
No. 29 St. John's ‍†‍‍^{y}	20	–	7	–	0	.741	41	–	19	–	0	.683
Cincinnati ‍‍‍	19	–	8	–	0	.704	39	–	20	–	0	.661
Notre Dame ‍‍‍	16	–	10	–	0	.615	33	–	21	–	1	.609
Louisville ‍‍‡‍^{y}	16	–	11	–	0	.593	41	–	21	–	0	.661
Seton Hall ‍‍‍	15	–	12	–	0	.556	31	–	25	–	0	.554
South Florida ‍‍‍	14	–	13	–	0	.519	31	–	27	–	0	.534
West Virginia ‍‍‍	13	–	14	–	0	.481	31	–	27	–	0	.534
Villanova ‍‍‍	12	–	15	–	0	.444	30	–	28	–	0	.517
Connecticut ‍‍‍	11	–	16	–	0	.407	27	–	28	–	0	.491
Rutgers ‍‍‍	11	–	16	–	0	.407	23	–	29	–	1	.443
Pittsburgh ‍‍‍	7	–	19	–	0	.269	19	–	34	–	0	.358
Georgetown ‍‍‍	7	–	20	–	0	.259	18	–	32	–	0	.360
† – Conference champion ‡ – Tournament champion y – Invited to the NCAA tournament As of June 30, 2008; Rankings from Collegiate Baseball

The 2008 Big East Conference baseball tournament was held at Bright House Field in Clearwater, FL. This was the twenty fourth annual Big East Conference baseball tournament, and second to be held at Bright House Field. The Louisville Cardinals won their first tournament championship and claimed the Big East Conference's automatic bid to the 2008 NCAA Division I baseball tournament. Louisville joined the league prior to the 2006 season.

== Format and seeding ==
The Big East baseball tournament was an 8 team double elimination tournament in 2008. The top eight regular season finishers were seeded one through eight based on conference winning percentage only. The field was divided into two brackets, with the winners of each bracket meeting in a single championship game.

Team	W	L	Pct.	GB	Seed
St. John's	20	7	.741	–	1
Cincinnati	19	8	.704	1	2
Notre Dame	16	10	.615	3.5	3
Louisville	16	11	.593	4	4
Seton Hall	15	12	.556	5	5
South Florida	14	13	.519	6	6
West Virginia	13	14	.481	7	7
Villanova	12	15	.444	8	8
Connecticut	11	16	.407	9	–
Rutgers	11	16	.407	9	–
Pittsburgh	7	19	.269	12.5	–
Georgetown	7	20	.259	13	–

== Tournament ==
First round
1	St. John's	0†
8	Villanova	12†
4	Louisville	12
5	Seton Hall	3
1	St. John's	6
5	Seton Hall	12
2	Cincinnati	11
7	West Virginia	5
3	Notre Dame	3
6	South Florida	9
7	West Virginia	13
3	Notre Dame	6

Second round
8	Villanova	3†
4	Louisville	14†
8	Villanova	10
5	Seton Hall	0
2	Cincinnati	11†
6	South Florida	1†
6	South Florida	12
7	West Virginia	5

Semifinals
4	Louisville	13	—
8	Villanova	6	—
2	Cincinnati	13‡	—
6	South Florida	2‡	—

Final
4	Louisville	6
2	Cincinnati	3

† - Indicates game was suspended after seven innings due to 10 run mercy rule. ‡ - Indicates game was suspended after 8 innings due to 10 run mercy rule.

== All-Tournament Team ==
The following players were named to the All-Tournament team.

Position	Player	School
P	Justin Marks	Louisville
P	Bill Hoffman	Villanova
C	Ryan Baker	Cincinnati
IF	Josh Harrison	Cincinnati
IF	Mike Spina	Cincinnati
IF	Justin McClanahan	Louisville
IF	Chris Dominguez	Louisville
OF	Austin Markel	West Virginia
OF	Jamel Scott	Cincinnati
OF	Josh Richmond	Louisville
DH	Stephen Hunt	South Florida

== Jack Kaiser Award ==
Chris Dominguez was the winner of the 2008 Jack Kaiser Award. Dominguez was a sophomore third baseman for Louisville.
