= 2001 Big East Conference baseball tournament =

American college baseball tournament

- Teams: 4
- Format: Double-elimination tournament
- Finals site: Commerce Bank Ballpark; Bridgewater, New Jersey
- Champions: Seton Hall (2nd title)
- Winning coach: Rob Sheppard (1st title)
- MVP: Isaac Pavlik (Seton Hall)

2001 Big East Conference baseball standings
	Conf.						Overall
Team	W		L		T	PCT	W		L		T	PCT
No. 12 Notre Dame ‍†‍‍^{y}	22	–	4	–	0	.846	49	–	13	–	1	.786
No. 25 Rutgers ‍‍‍^{y}	18	–	8	–	0	.692	42	–	17	–	0	.712
Seton Hall ‍‍‡‍^{y}	14	–	11	–	1	.558	34	–	23	–	1	.595
Virginia Tech ‍‍‍	14	–	11	–	1	.558	29	–	28	–	1	.509
St. John's ‍‍‍	13	–	13	–	0	.500	31	–	22	–	0	.585
Connecticut ‍‍‍	13	–	13	–	0	.500	26	–	25	–	0	.510
West Virginia ‍‍‍	12	–	14	–	0	.462	27	–	26	–	0	.509
Boston College ‍‍‍	11	–	13	–	0	.458	29	–	22	–	0	.569
Villanova ‍‍‍	10	–	16	–	0	.385	25	–	25	–	1	.500
Georgetown ‍‍‍	7	–	19	–	0	.269	17	–	39	–	0	.304
Pittsburgh ‍‍‍	6	–	18	–	0	.250	18	–	27	–	0	.400
† – Conference champion ‡ – Tournament champion y – Invited to the NCAA tournament As of June 30, 2001; Rankings from Collegiate Baseball

The 2001 Big East Conference baseball tournament was held at Commerce Bank Ballpark in Bridgewater, New Jersey. This was the seventeenth annual Big East Conference baseball tournament. The Seton Hall Pirates won their second tournament championship and claimed the Big East Conference's automatic bid to the 2001 NCAA Division I baseball tournament.

== Format and seeding ==
The Big East baseball tournament was a 4 team double elimination tournament in 2001. The top four regular season finishers were seeded one through four based on conference winning percentage only. Seton Hall claimed the third seed over Virginia Tech by tiebreaker.

Team	W	L	T	Pct.	GB	Seed
Notre Dame	22	4	0	.846	–	1
Rutgers	18	8	0	.692	4	2
Seton Hall	14	11	1	.558	7.5	3
Virginia Tech	14	11	1	.558	7.5	4
St. John's	13	13	0	.500	9	–
Connecticut	13	13	0	.500	9	–
West Virginia	12	14	0	.462	10	–
Boston College	11	13	0	.458	10	–
Villanova	10	16	0	.385	12	–
Georgetown	7	19	0	.269	15	–
Pittsburgh	6	18	0	.250	15	–

== Bracket ==
Upper round 1
1	Notre Dame	3
4	Virginia Tech	4
2	Rutgers	2
3	Seton Hall	4
Lower round 1
1	Notre Dame	6
2	Rutgers	2

Upper final
4	Virginia Tech	0
3	Seton Hall	5
Lower final
4	Virginia Tech	5
1	Notre Dame	2

Final
3	Seton Hall
4	Virginia Tech

== Jack Kaiser Award ==
Isaac Pavlik was the winner of the 2001 Jack Kaiser Award. Pavlik was a junior pitcher for Seton Hall.
