= John Delaney (baseball) =

American college baseball coach

Current position
- Title: Head coach
- Team: Quinnipiac
- Conference: MAAC
- Record: 251–324–1 (.437)

Biographical details
- Born: December 30, 1985 (age 40); Hanson, Massachusetts, U.S.
- Education: Xaverian Brothers High School; Quinnipiac, B.A.

Playing career
- 2005–2008: Quinnipiac

Coaching career (HC unless noted)
- 2011: Sacred Heart (asst.)
- 2012: Hartford (asst.)
- 2013–2014: Quinnipiac (asst.)
- 2015–present: Quinnipiac

Head coaching record
- Overall: 251–324–1 (.437)
- Tournaments: NCAA: 1–2

Accomplishments and honors

Championships
- MAAC (2019); MAAC Tournament (2019)

Awards
- MAAC Coach of the Year (2018)

John Delaney (born December 30, 1985) is an American college baseball coach who was named Quinnipiac's head coach prior to the start of the 2015 season. A Quinnipiac alumnus, Delaney played minor league baseball in the Milwaukee Brewers system before starting his coaching career.

== Playing career ==
Delaney attended Xaverian Brothers High School in Westwood, Massachusetts, where he won a state baseball championship in 2004. Delaney played college baseball at Quinnipiac from 2005 to 2008. He was named an all-Northeast Conference player each year. In 2008, the Milwaukee Brewers selected him in the 25th round of the Major League Baseball draft. He spent 2008 and 2009 in Milwaukee's minor league system, advancing as high as Class-A Wisconsin. He played independent league baseball in 2010 before retiring.

== Coaching career ==
He began his coaching career as an assistant at Sacred Heart in 2011 under head coach Nick Giaquinto. That year, the Pioneers won the NEC tournament to advance to their second NCAA tournament, where they went 0–2. Delaney spent 2012 as an assistant at Hartford under first-year head coach Justin Blood.

Delaney joined Quinnipiac's staff as an assistant for the 2013 season. In 2014, Quinnipiac promoted Delaney to associate head coach and named him the successor of head coach Dan Gooley, who announced that he would retire after the season.

In 2015, Delaney's first season as head coach, Quinnipiac made its second straight playoff appearance with a 15–9, third-place showing in the MAAC. It was the Bobcats' highest regular-season finish since sharing the NEC regular-season title in 2007. In the MAAC Tournament, Quinnipiac won its first two games against #6 Marist and #2 Canisius before bowing out after losses to Siena and Canisius. The team placed a league-high five players on the all-MAAC First Team.

== Head coaching record ==
Record table
Season	Team	Overall	Conference	Standing	Postseason
Quinnipiac (MAAC) (2015–present)
2015	Quinnipiac	29–27	15–9	3rd	MAAC tournament
2016	Quinnipiac	21–31	10–14	T-8th	
2017	Quinnipiac	18–32	11–13	T-8th	
2018	Quinnipiac	26–30	16–8	2nd	MAAC tournament
2019	Quinnipiac	30–29	17–7	T-1st	NCAA Regional
2020	Quinnipiac	3–11	0–0		Season canceled due to COVID-19
2021	Quinnipiac	7–21	7–21	9th	
2022	Quinnipiac	15–33	8–15	T-8th	
2023	Quinnipiac	30–26	16–8	T-3rd	MAAC tournament
2024	Quinnipiac	20–30	10–14	8th	
2025	Quinnipiac	29–26–1	17–13	T–3rd	MAAC Tournament
2026	Quinnipiac	23–28	14–16	8th	
Total:		251–324–1 (.437)	141–138 (.505)		
National champion Postseason invitational champion Conference regular season champion Conference regular season and conference tournament champion Division regular season champion Division regular season and conference tournament champion Conference tournament champion
