= 2000 Big East Conference baseball tournament =

American college baseball tournament

- Teams: 6
- Format: Double-elimination tournament
- Finals site: Commerce Bank Ballpark; Bridgewater, New Jersey
- Champions: Rutgers (2nd title)
- Winning coach: Fred Hill (2nd title)
- MVP: Bobby Brownlie (Rutgers)

2000 Big East Conference baseball standings
	Conf.				Overall
Team	W		L	PCT	W		L	PCT
Rutgers ‍†‍‡‍^{y}	18	–	5	.783	40	–	18	.690
Notre Dame ‍‍‍^{y}	18	–	7	.720	46	–	18	.719
Seton Hall ‍‍‍^{y}	18	–	7	.720	40	–	18	.690
Connecticut ‍‍‍	14	–	9	.609	32	–	17	.653
Boston College ‍‍‍	12	–	11	.522	32	–	20	.615
Pittsburgh ‍‍‍	11	–	13	.458	31	–	24	.564
West Virginia ‍‍‍	10	–	12	.455	25	–	28	.472
St. John's ‍‍‍	8	–	15	.348	29	–	22	.569
Villanova ‍‍‍	8	–	15	.348	24	–	26	.480
Georgetown ‍‍‍	1	–	24	.040	13	–	43	.232
† – Conference champion ‡ – Tournament champion y – Invited to the NCAA tournament As of June 30, 2000; Rankings from Collegiate Baseball

The 2000 Big East Conference baseball tournament was held at Commerce Bank Ballpark in Bridgewater, New Jersey. This was the sixteenth annual Big East Conference baseball tournament. The Rutgers Scarlet Knights won their second tournament championship, and second in three years, to claim the Big East Conference's automatic bid to the 2000 NCAA Division I baseball tournament.

== Format and seeding ==
The Big East baseball tournament was a 6 team double elimination tournament in 2000. The top six regular season finishers were seeded one through six based on conference winning percentage only. Notre Dame claimed the second seed by winning the season series over Seton Hall.

Team	W	L	Pct.	GB	Seed
Rutgers	18	5	.783	–	1
Notre Dame	18	7	.720	1	2
Seton Hall	18	7	.720	1	3
Connecticut	14	9	.609	4	4
Boston College	12	11	.522	6	5
Pittsburgh	11	13	.458	7.5	6
West Virginia	10	12	.455	7.5	–
St. John's	8	15	.348	10	–
Villanova	8	15	.348	10	–
Georgetown	1	24	.040	18	–

== Bracket ==
First round
1	Rutgers	11
6	Pittsburgh	3
2	Notre Dame	3
5	Boston College	4
3	Seton Hall	8
4	Connecticut	2

Second round
1	Rutgers	8
4	Connecticut	7
5	Boston College	4
2	Seton Hall	12
6	Pittsburgh	7
2	Notre Dame	15

Third round
1	Rutgers	6
2	Seton Hall	2
5	Boston College	6
2	Notre Dame	5

Semifinals
2	Seton Hall	6
5	Boston College	5

Final
1	Rutgers	3	1
2	Seton Hall	4	0

== Jack Kaiser Award ==
Bobby Brownlie was the winner of the 2000 Jack Kaiser Award. Brownlie was a freshman pitcher for Rutgers.
