= 2009 Big East Conference baseball tournament =

American college baseball tournament

- Teams: 8
- Format: Double-elimination tournament
- Finals site: Bright House Field; Clearwater, Florida
- Champions: Louisville (2nd title)
- Winning coach: Dan McDonnell (2nd title)
- MVP: Andrew Clark (Louisville)

2009 Big East Conference baseball standings
	Conf.				Overall
Team	W		L	PCT	W		L	PCT
No. 14 Louisville ‍†‍‡‍^{y}	19	–	7	.731	47	–	18	.723
South Florida ‍‍‍	18	–	9	.667	34	–	25	.576
West Virginia ‍‍‍	17	–	10	.630	37	–	18	.673
St. John's ‍‍‍	16	–	11	.593	30	–	22	.577
Notre Dame ‍‍‍	15	–	12	.556	36	–	23	.610
Connecticut ‍‍‍	14	–	13	.519	36	–	24	.600
Pittsburgh ‍‍‍	13	–	13	.500	28	–	21	.571
Cincinnati ‍‍‍	13	–	14	.481	29	–	29	.500
Seton Hall ‍‍‍	13	–	14	.481	25	–	24	.510
Georgetown ‍‍‍	8	–	18	.308	17	–	34	.333
Rutgers ‍‍‍	8	–	19	.296	22	–	31	.415
Villanova ‍‍‍	6	–	10	.375	22	–	28	.440
† – Conference champion ‡ – Tournament champion y – Invited to the NCAA tournament As of June 30, 2009; Rankings from Collegiate Baseball

The 2009 Big East Conference baseball tournament was held at Bright House Field in Clearwater, FL. This was the twenty fifth annual Big East Conference baseball tournament, and third to be held at Bright House Field. The Louisville Cardinals won their second tournament championship in a row and claimed the Big East Conference's automatic bid to the 2009 NCAA Division I baseball tournament. Louisville joined the league prior to the 2006 season.

== Format and seeding ==
The Big East baseball tournament was an 8 team double elimination tournament in 2009. The top eight regular season finishers were seeded one through eight based on conference winning percentage only. The field was divided into two brackets, with the winners of each bracket meeting in a single championship game.

Team	W	L	Pct.	GB	Seed
Louisville	19	7	.731	–	1
South Florida	18	9	.667	1.5	2
West Virginia	17	10	.630	2.5	3
St. John's	16	11	.593	3.5	4
Notre Dame	15	12	.556	4.5	5
Connecticut	14	13	.519	5.5	6
Pittsburgh	13	13	.500	6	7
Cincinnati	13	14	.481	6.5	8
Seton Hall	13	14	.481	6.5	–
Georgetown	8	18	.308	11	–
Rutgers	8	19	.296	11.5	–
Villanova	6	20	.231	13	–

== Tournament ==
First round
1	Louisville	12†
8	Cincinnati	2
4	St. John's	5
5	Notre Dame	14
8	Cincinnati	2
4	St. John's	12
2	South Florida	12‡
7	Pittsburgh	2‡
3	West Virginia	1
6	Connecticut	6
7	Pittsburgh	8†
3	West Virginia	20†

Second round
1	Louisville	12
5	Notre Dame	2
5	Notre Dame	11
4	St. John's	10
2	South Florida	2
6	Connecticut	4
2	South Florida	11
3	West Virginia	6

Semifinals
1	Louisville	6	7
5	Notre Dame	6	6
6	Connecticut	10	—
2	South Florida	8	—

Final
1	Louisville	11
6	Connecticut	3

† - Indicates game was suspended after 7 innings due to 10 run mercy rule. ‡ - Indicates game was suspended after 8 innings due to 10 run mercy rule.

== All-Tournament Team ==
The following players were named to the All-Tournament team.

Position	Player	School
P	Will Hudgins	Notre Dame
P	Tony Zych	Louisville
C	Jeff Arnold	Louisville
IF	Pierre LePage	Connecticut
IF	Andrew Clark	Louisville
IF	Mike Nemeth	Connecticut
IF	Sam Mende	South Florida
OF	Austin Markel	West Virginia
OF	Peter Patse	Connecticut
OF	Ryan Wright	Louisville
DH	Phil Wunderlich	Louisville

== Jack Kaiser Award ==
Andrew Clark was the winner of the 2009 Jack Kaiser Award. Clark was a junior first baseman for Louisville.
