= 2007 Big East Conference baseball tournament =

American college baseball tournament

- Teams: 8
- Format: Double-elimination tournament
- Finals site: KeySpan Park; Brooklyn, New York
- Champions: Rutgers (3rd title)
- Winning coach: Fred Hill (3rd title)
- MVP: Todd Frazier (Rutgers)

2007 Big East Conference baseball standings
	Conf.				Overall
Team	W		L	PCT	W		L	PCT
St. John's ‍†‍‍^{y}	20	–	7	.741	41	–	19	.683
No. 30 Rutgers ‍†‍‡‍^{y}	20	–	7	.741	42	–	21	.667
Louisville ‍‍‍^{y}	19	–	8	.704	47	–	24	.662
Pittsburgh ‍‍‍	15	–	11	.577	27	–	27	.500
South Florida ‍‍‍	13	–	14	.481	34	–	26	.567
Villanova ‍‍‍	12	–	15	.444	29	–	25	.537
Notre Dame ‍‍‍	11	–	15	.423	28	–	28	.500
Connecticut ‍‍‍	10	–	14	.417	34	–	27	.557
West Virginia ‍‍‍	10	–	16	.385	29	–	22	.569
Cincinnati ‍‍‍	10	–	16	.385	28	–	28	.500
Seton Hall ‍‍‍	9	–	15	.375	25	–	25	.500
Georgetown ‍‍‍	8	–	19	.296	21	–	34	.382
† – Conference champion ‡ – Tournament champion y – Invited to the NCAA tournament As of June 30, 2007; Rankings from Collegiate Baseball

The 2007 Big East Conference baseball tournament was held at KeySpan Park in Brooklyn, NY. This was the twenty third annual Big East Conference baseball tournament. The Rutgers Scarlet Knights won their third tournament championship and claimed the Big East Conference's automatic bid to the 2007 NCAA Division I baseball tournament.

== Format and seeding ==
The Big East baseball tournament was an 8 team double elimination tournament in 2007. The top eight regular season finishers were seeded one through eight based on conference winning percentage only. The field was divided into two brackets, with the winners of each bracket meeting in a single championship game.

Team	W	L	Pct.	GB	Seed
St. John's	20	7	.741	–	1
Rutgers	20	7	.741	–	2
Louisville	19	8	.704	1	3
Pittsburgh	15	11	.577	4.5	4
South Florida	13	14	.481	7	5
Villanova	12	15	.444	8	6
Notre Dame	11	15	.423	8.5	7
Connecticut	10	14	.417	8.5	8
West Virginia	10	16	.417	9.5	–
Cincinnati	10	16	.385	9.5	–
Seton Hall	9	15	.375	9.5	–
Georgetown	8	19	.296	12	–

== Tournament ==
First round
1	St. John's	2
8	Connecticut	1
4	Pittsburgh	1
5	South Florida	2
8	Connecticut	5
4	Pittsburgh	2
2	Rutgers	13
7	Notre Dame	2
3	Louisville	3
6	Villanova	1
7	Notre Dame	2
6	Villanova	3

Second round
1	St. John's	0
5	South Florida	2
1	St. John's	7
8	Connecticut	8
2	Rutgers	1
3	Louisville	8
2	Rutgers	11
6	Villanova	0

Semifinals
5	South Florida	0	0
8	Connecticut	3	2
3	Louisville	7	1
2	Rutgers	10	3

Final
8	Connecticut	6
2	Rutgers	7

== Jack Kaiser Award ==
Todd Frazier was the winner of the 2007 Jack Kaiser Award. Frazier was a junior shortstop for Rutgers.
