= Quinnipiac Baseball Field =

Baseball park in Hamden, Connecticut, U.S.

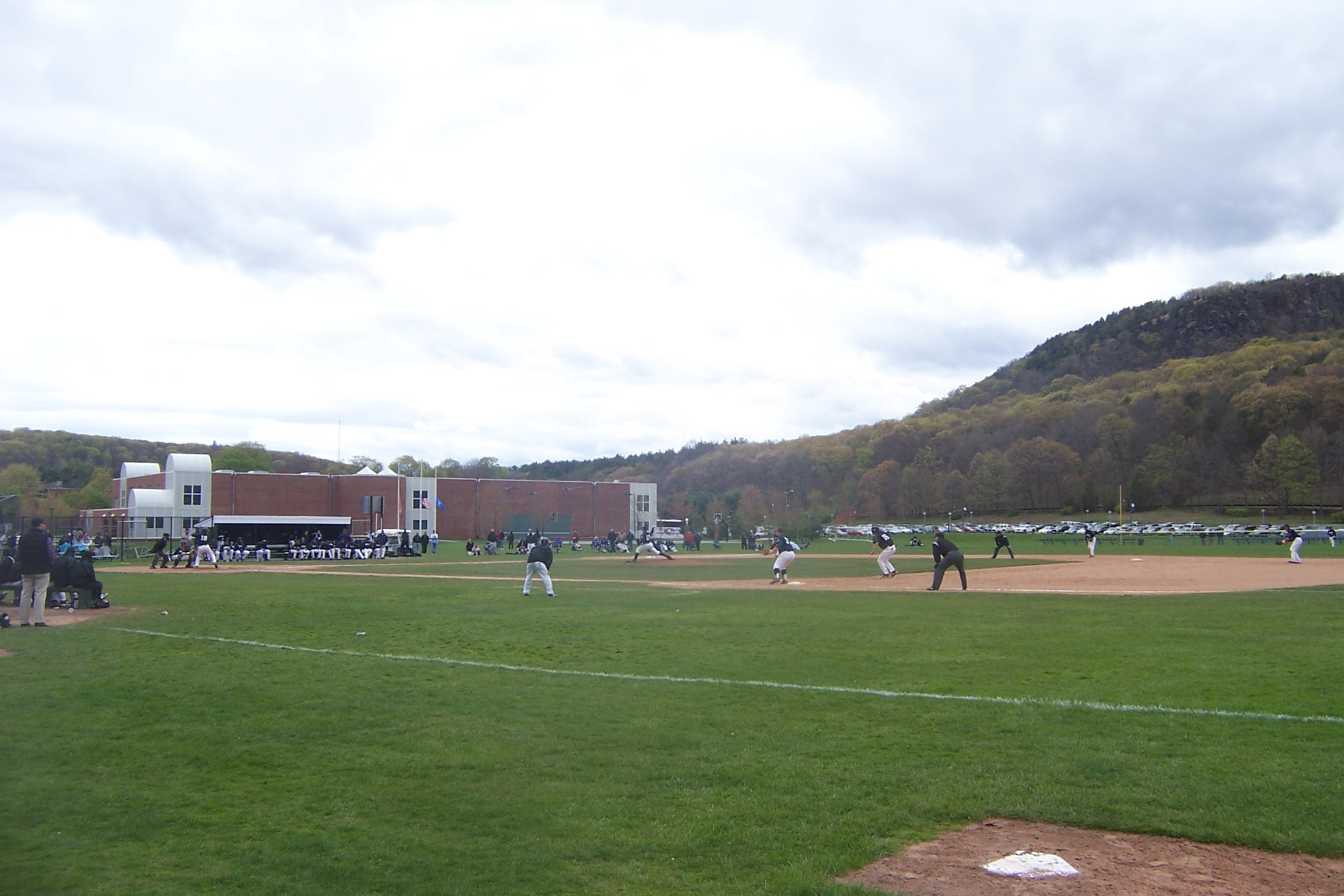
- Quinnipiac Baseball Field
- Interactive map of Quinnipiac Baseball Field
- Location: 275 Mount Carmel Avenue, Hamden, Connecticut, USA
- Coordinates: 41.419878°N 72.891449°W
- Owner: Quinnipiac University
- Operator: Quinnipiac University
- Capacity: 320
- Surface: Natural grass
- Scoreboard: Electronic
- Field size: 340 ft. (LF); 375 ft. (LCF); 400 ft. (CF); 375 ft. (RCF); 340 ft. (RF)

Construction
- Built: 1966
- Opened: 1967

Tenant
- Quinnipiac Bobcats baseball (NCAA DI MAAC)

Quinnipiac Baseball Field is a baseball venue in Hamden, Connecticut, United States. It is home to the Quinnipiac Bobcats baseball team of the NCAA Division I Metro Atlantic Athletic Conference. The venue features portable bleacher seating and a press booth. It also has an embankment in right center field that lies in play.

A group of students, including future head coach Dan Gooley, built the park in the summer of 1966. Previously, the program played at Hamden's Legion Field.

The mountains that make up Sleeping Giant State Park are visible beyond the outfield fence.

== See also ==
- List of NCAA Division I baseball venues
