= Dan Gooley =

American baseball coach

Biographical details
- Education: Quinnipiac

Playing career
- 1967–1970: Quinnipiac
- Position: P

Coaching career (HC unless noted)
- 1971–1976: Quinnipiac (asst.)
- 1977–1987: Quinnipiac
- 1988–1992: Hartford
- 2002–2014: Quinnipiac

Head coaching record
- Overall: 542-599-8
- Tournaments: NCAA: 0-2; NEC: 4-7; MAAC: 1-2

Dan Gooley is an American college baseball coach, formerly the head coach of Quinnipiac (1977–1987, 2002–2014) and Hartford (1988–1992). Gooley retired following the 2014 season.

Gooley played baseball at Quinnipiac and served as an assistant coach at Quinnipiac from 1971 to 1976. Prior to the start of the 1977 season, Gooley was named Quinnipiac's head coach. Quinnipiac, then a Division II program, reached three NCAA Division II Tournaments and one Division II College World Series under Gooley. In the summer of 1977, he skippered the Falmouth Commodores of the Cape Cod Baseball League.

Gooley left Quinnipiac following the 1987 season to serve as the head coach at Division I Hartford. In five seasons as Hartford's head coach, he had a record of 101-90-1. After spending several years as a business executive and Quinnipiac administrator, Gooley again became the head coach of Quinnipiac (which had since become a Division I member) for the 2002 season. In 2005, Gooley led the Bobcats to their only NCAA tournament appearance.

== Head coaching record ==
The following is a table of Gooley's yearly records as an NCAA head baseball coach.

Record table
Season	Team	Overall	Conference	Standing	Postseason
Quinnipiac (Independent) (1977–1987)
1977	Quinnipiac	8-19-2			
1978	Quinnipiac	16-14			
1979	Quinnipiac	23-8			NCAA Regional
1980	Quinnipiac	9-15-1			
1981	Quinnipiac	18-8			
1982	Quinnipiac	22-7-1			
1983	Quinnipiac	25-10			College World Series
1984	Quinnipiac	25-8			NCAA Regional
1985	Quinnipiac	18-12			
1986	Quinnipiac	20-10-1			
1987	Quinnipiac	19-11			
Quinnipiac:		205-112-5			
Hartford (ECAC North/North Atlantic Conference) (1988–1992)
1988	Hartford	29-12			
1989	Hartford	17-15-1			
1990	Hartford	15-20	4-10	t-5th	
1991	Hartford	13-22	5-10	5th	
1992	Hartford	27-21	18-10	2nd	ECAC Tournament
Hartford:		101-90-1			
Quinnipiac (Northeast Conference) (2002–2013)
2002	Quinnipiac	12-30	9-18	7th	
2003	Quinnipiac	17-24	14-13	5th	
2004	Quinnipiac	23-21	16-7	2nd	NEC Tournament
2005	Quinnipiac	26-24	17-6	1st	NCAA Regional
2006	Quinnipiac	22-24-1	14-8	2nd	NEC Tournament
2007	Quinnipiac	29-18-1	21-7	t-1st	NEC Tournament
2008	Quinnipiac	16-36	9-19	7th	
2009	Quinnipiac	18-34	11-17	t-6th	
2010	Quinnipiac	14-39	13-19	7th	
2011	Quinnipiac	15-32	11-21	7th	
2012	Quinnipiac	9-38	8-24	8th	
2013	Quinnipiac	17-36	12-20	7th	
Quinnipiac (Metro Atlantic Athletic Conference) (2014)
2014	Quinnipiac	18-31	13-12	5th	MAAC tournament
Quinnipiac:		236-387-2	173-210		
Total:		542-599-8			
National champion Postseason invitational champion Conference regular season champion Conference regular season and conference tournament champion Division regular season champion Division regular season and conference tournament champion Conference tournament champion
