= Joe Litterio =

College Basketball coach

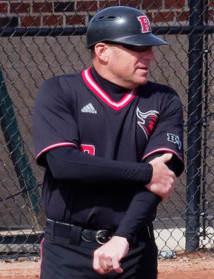
- Litterio with Rutgers in 2018

Biographical details
- Born: January 15, 1971 (age 55)

Playing career
- 1990–1993: Rutgers
- Position: Second base

Coaching career (HC unless noted)
- 1994: Rutgers (assistant)
- 1995–1998: Monmouth (assistant)
- 1999: Winthrop (assistant)
- 2000–2011: Wagner
- 2012–2013: Rutgers (assistant)
- 2014–2019: Rutgers

Head coaching record
- Overall: 380–550–3

Joe Litterio (born January 15, 1971) is an American college baseball coach, was the head coach of the Rutgers Scarlet Knights baseball team. He has held that position since the 2014 season until the end of the 2019 season. After his playing career with the Scarlet Knights, Litterio served as a volunteer assistant with his alma mater while also coaching at Immaculate Conception High School. He then became an assistant at Monmouth for four seasons before one season as an assistant with Winthrop. He then earned his first head coaching job at Wagner, where he remained for twelve seasons. In 2012, he returned to Rutgers as associate head coach under Fred Hill before assuming the top role two years later. On May 28, 2019, Litterio was let go by not having his contract renewed.

== Head coaching record ==
Below is a table of Litterio's yearly records as an NCAA baseball coach.

Record table
Season	Team	Overall	Conference	Standing	Postseason
Wagner Seahawks (Northeast Conference) (2000–2011)
2000	Wagner	24–30–1	14–8	3rd (South)	NCAA Regional
2001	Wagner	16–30–1	8–14	4th (South)	
2002	Wagner	10–39	8–19	T–8th	
2003	Wagner	11–36	10–16	9th	
2004	Wagner	20–29	12–11	4th	NEC Tournament
2005	Wagner	22–27	13–10	4th	NEC Tournament
2006	Wagner	18–34	15–9	3rd	NEC Tournament
2007	Wagner	17–34	11–17	6th	
2008	Wagner	27–28	17–11	3rd	
2009	Wagner	31–21	17–9	1st	NEC Tournament
2010	Wagner	26–31	17–15	4th	NEC Tournament
2011	Wagner	18–33	12–20	6th	
Wagner:		240–372–2	154–159		
Rutgers Scarlet Knights (American Athletic Conference) (2014)
2014	Rutgers	30–25	14–9	T–3rd	AAC tournament
Rutgers Scarlet Knights (Big Ten Conference) (2015–2019)
2015	Rutgers	19–35–1	7–17	11th	
2016	Rutgers	27–28	9–15	11th	
2017	Rutgers	19–34	7–16	10th	
2018	Rutgers	25–25	7–16	11th	
2019	Rutgers	20–31	9–14	10th	
Rutgers:		140–178–1	53–87		
Total:		380–550–3			
National champion Postseason invitational champion Conference regular season champion Conference regular season and conference tournament champion Division regular season champion Division regular season and conference tournament champion Conference tournament champion
