= Bainton Field =

Baseball stadium in New Jersey

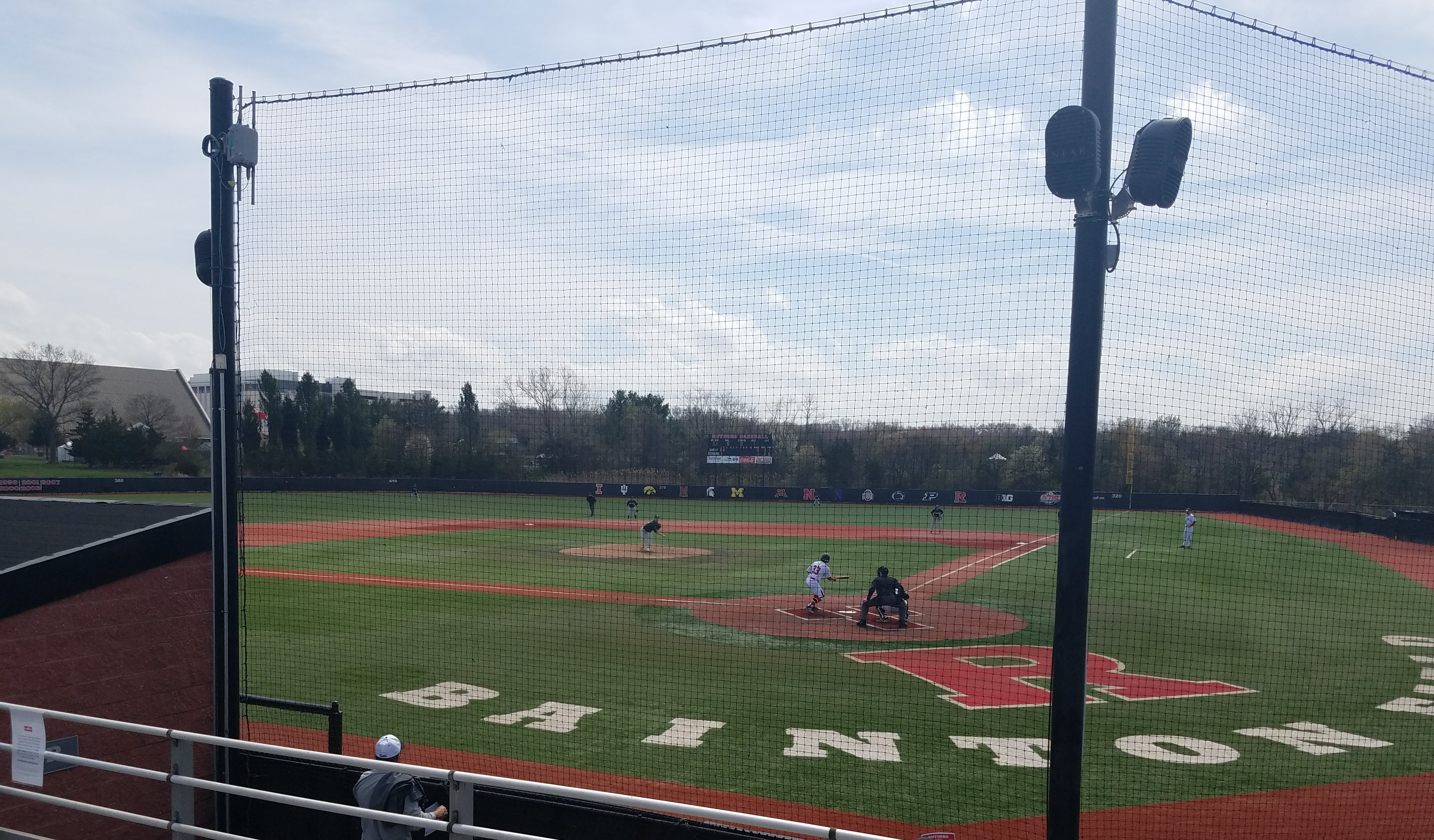
- Interactive map of Bainton Field
- Former names: Class of 1953 Complex - Gruninger Baseball Complex
- Location: Piscataway, New Jersey
- Coordinates: 40.527232°N 74.443295°W
- Owner: Rutgers University
- Operator: Rutgers University
- Capacity: 1,308
- Surface: Field Turf
- Field size: LL - 330 LC - 385 CF - 410 RC - 370 RL - 320

Construction
- Renovated: 2026

Tenant
- Rutgers Scarlet Knights baseball (1953–present)

Bainton Field is a baseball stadium in Piscataway, New Jersey. It is the home field of the Rutgers University Scarlet Knights college baseball team. The stadium holds 1,308 spectators.

== History ==
On May 2, 1866, Rutgers baseball contested the university's first intercollegiate athletic event, a 40–2 loss to Princeton.

The original name of the facility was the "Class of 1953 Complex - Gruninger Baseball Complex"; however, in 2007, the stadium was renamed in honor of Ron Bainton, an alumnus who graduated from Rutgers in 1962. Bainton donated $1.25 million to renovate the stadium and for ongoing enhancements in the future. Renovations to the stadium included: a new FieldTurf playing surface, the construction of a new outfield wall, as well as on-field facilities to include a practice diamond and three full length batting cages and five practice pitching mounds.

On August 21, 2015, the Rutgers Athletics department announced a $3.3 million project to construct an indoor training facility for the baseball and softball teams. The Fred Hill Training Complex, named after long-time Rutgers head baseball coach Fred Hill, will be located between Bainton Field and the Rutgers softball complex. The facility is estimated to be approximately 22,500 sq. feet and utilize state-of-the-art pitching machines, batting cages, bullpen mounds and a full turf infield.

On October 24, 2015, construction began on the Fred Hill Training Complex with a groundbreaking ceremony held prior to the football game between Rutgers and Ohio State. The new indoor practice complex is part of a larger athletic facilities upgrade sponsored by the university, which will also include, but is not limited to, expansion of Bainton Field capacity to approximately 2,000-3,000 seats and a new softball facility.

On February 12, 2026, Rutgers announced upgrades to Bainton Field that increased its seating capacity to 1,308 and added a new press box with a broadcast booth.

== See also ==
- List of NCAA Division I baseball venues
