= Quinnipiac Bobcats baseball =

- 2026 Quinnipiac Bobcats baseball team
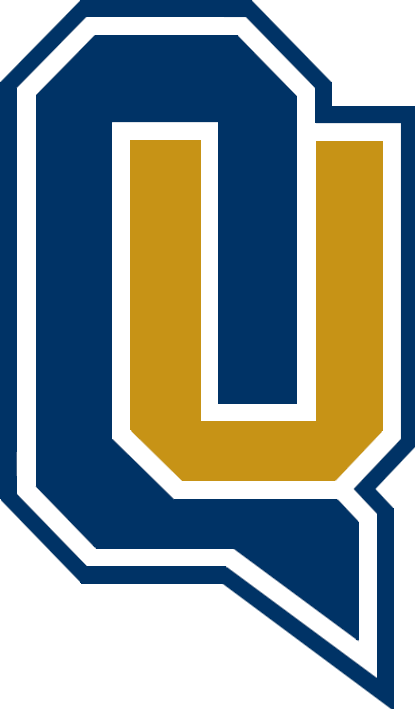
- University: Quinnipiac University
- Head coach: John Delaney (12th season)
- Conference: The Metro
- Location: Hamden, Connecticut
- Home stadium: Quinnipiac Baseball Field
- Nickname: Bobcats
- Colors: Navy and gold

NCAA tournament appearances
- Division II; 1979, 1983, 1984, 1988 Division I 2005, 2019

Conference tournament champions
- NEC: 2005 MAAC: 2019

Conference regular season champions
- NEC: 2005, 2007 MAAC: 2019

The Quinnipiac Bobcats baseball team (formerly the Quinnipiac Braves) is a varsity intercollegiate athletic team of Quinnipiac University in Hamden, Connecticut, United States. The team is a member of the Metro Atlantic Athletic Conference, which is part of the National Collegiate Athletic Association's Division I. The team plays its home games at Quinnipiac Baseball Field in Hamden, Connecticut. The Bobcats are coached by John Delaney.

== Quinnipiac in the NCAA Tournament ==
| Year | Record | Pct | Notes |
|---|---|---|---|
| 2005 | 0–2 | .000 | Austin Regional |
| 2019 | 1–2 | .333 | Greenville Regional |
| TOTALS | 1–4 | .200 | |

== Notable alumni ==
As of the 2024 season, 2 Bobcats have played in MLB, those being Matthew Batten & Turk Wendell. 22 players have been drafted by major league teams and 31 have played professionally. There are four alumni currently playing in the minor leagues as of October 2024.

== See also ==
- List of NCAA Division I baseball programs
