= Rutgers Scarlet Knights baseball =

American college baseball team

Rutgers Scarlet Knights Baseball
- 2026 Rutgers Scarlet Knights baseball team
- Founded: 1870
- University: Rutgers University
- Head coach: Steve Owens (7th season)
- Conference: Big Ten
- Location: Piscataway, New Jersey
- Home stadium: Bainton Field (capacity: 1,308)
- Nickname: Scarlet Knights
- Colors: Scarlet

College World Series appearances
- 1950

NCAA tournament appearances
- 1950, 1966, 1968, 1970, 1986, 1988, 1990, 1991, 1993, 1998, 1999, 2000, 2001, 2003, 2007

Conference tournament champions
- Big East: 1998, 2000, 2007; A-10: 1981, 1986, 1988, 1990, 1991, 1993

Conference regular season champions
- Big East: 1998, 2000, 2003, 2007; A-10: 1981, 1982, 1986, 1987, 1988, 1989, 1990, 1991, 1992, 1993

Rutgers Scarlet Knights Baseball is the varsity intercollegiate team representing Rutgers University in the sport of college baseball at the Division I level of the National Collegiate Athletic Association (NCAA). The team plays its home games at Bainton Field on campus in Piscataway, New Jersey. The Scarlet Knights are members of the Big Ten Conference, which they joined prior to the 2014 season.

== History ==
The program's first year of competition was 1870. For their first 37 seasons, the program competed without a head coach, compiling a record of 102-157-1.

=== Fred Hill era (1984–2014) ===
The 2007 baseball squad tied the school record for victories with 42 and tallied numbers of 63 home runs and 425 RBIs, good enough for second-most in school history. The team finished in first place in the Big East in the regular season, and won the 2007 Big East Conference baseball tournament A record high 6 players would be selected in the 2007 Major League Baseball draft. The home runs record would go on to be broken in the 2010 season.

=== Joe Litterio era (2014–2019) ===
Under head coach Joe Litterio, Rutgers Baseball made the transition from the American Athletic Conference to the Big Ten Conference.

=== Steve Owens era (2020-present) ===
On May 28, 2019, Joe Litterio's contract was not renewed. On June 26 2019, Steve Owens was announced as the new head coach of the Rutgers program.

== Rutgers in the NCAA tournament ==
Year	Record	Pct	Notes
1950	3–2	.600	College World Series 5th place
1966	1–2	.333	District 2
1968	0–2	.000	District 2
1970	0–2	.000	District 2
1986	0–2	.000	Northeast Regional
1988	1–2	.333	Northeast Regional
1990	4–2	.667	Northeast Regional
1991	0–2	.000	Central Regional
1993	1–2	.333	Mideast Regional
1998	1–2	.333	Atlantic II Regional
1999	0–2	.000	Lubbock Regional
2000	1–2	.333	Hosted Montclair Regional
2001	2–2	.500	Lincoln Regional
2003	1–2	.333	Tallahassee Regional
2007	1–2	.333	Charlottesville Regional
TOTALS	16-30	.348	

== Stadium ==
Rutgers plays at Bainton Field located on the campus of Rutgers University in Piscataway, New Jersey.

Beginning in the 2027 season, Rutgers will start playing at the new NEXUS Stadium, which is located on the campus of Middlesex College in Edison, NJ.

== Head coaches ==
Records are through the end of the 2021 season

Year(s)	Coach	Seasons	W-L-T	Pct
1870–1906	No Coach	36	102-157-1	.394
1907	Frank Gordon	1	3–8	.273
1908–1911	Frank Cox	4	18–35	.340
1912–1915	Walter S. Brodie	4	43–61	.414
1916–1917	Sandy Piez	2	6–11	.353
1918–1925	Frank Cox	8	38-61-1	.386
1926–1931	Fred Jacklitsch	6	43–42	.506
1932–1937	J. Wilder Tasker	6	35-53-2	.400
1938–1949	Charles Ward	11	104-76-2	.577
1950–1960	George Case	10	116-84-3	.579
1961–1983	Matt Bolger	22	304-277-7	.523
1984–2014	Fred Hill	30	941–662–7	.587
2015–2019	Joe Litterio	6	140–174–1	.446
2020–present	Steve Owens	5	132–95	.581
Totals	13 coaches	154 seasons	2,014–1,761–24	.533

Taken from the Rutgers Baseball 2021 Fact Book

== Major League Baseball ==
As of 2020, at least 25 former Scarlet Knights, including Todd Frazier, Eric Young and David DeJesus, have played in Major League Baseball and 72 players have been selected from the school in the Major League Baseball draft.
