= 2018 NCAA Division I baseball season =

Baseball season

- Duration: February 12 – June 28, 2018
- Number of teams: 299
- Preseason No. 1: Florida (Unanimous)
- Defending champions: Florida
- TV partner/s: ESPN

Tournament
- Duration: June 1–28, 2018
- Most conference bids: SEC (10)

College World Series
- Champions: Oregon State (3rd title)
- Runners-up: Arkansas (9th CWS Appearance)
- Winning coach: Pat Casey (3rd title)
- MOP: Adley Rutschman (Oregon State)

Seasons
- ← 2017 2019 →

The 2018 NCAA Division I Baseball season, play of college baseball in the United States organized by the National Collegiate Athletic Association (NCAA) at the Division I level, began in February 2018. The season progressed through the regular season, many conference tournaments and championship series, and concluded with the 2018 NCAA Division I baseball tournament and 2018 College World Series. The College World Series, consisting of the eight remaining teams in the NCAA tournament and held annually in Omaha, Nebraska, at TD Ameritrade Park Omaha, ended on June 28, 2018.

== Realignment and format changes ==
- NYIT, previously the last remaining Division I independent, moved its baseball program to its full-time home of the Division II East Coast Conference.
- Buffalo dropped their baseball program at the end of the 2017 season, leaving the Mid-American Conference with 10 teams. As a result, the MAC dissolved its divisions.
- The Ivy League dissolved its divisions, playing in a single league table for the first time since 1992. The top two finishers will meet in the Championship Series.
- Wichita State left the Missouri Valley Conference for the American Athletic Conference.
- Valparaiso left the Horizon League for the Missouri Valley Conference.

The 2018 season was also the last for two other teams in their then-current conferences. Both teams moved between the same two conferences, but in opposite directions.

- Liberty, after 27 seasons in the Big South Conference, joined the Atlantic Sun Conference (ASUN) on July 1, 2018.
- USC Upstate, after 11 years in the ASUN, moved to the Big South.

Finally, one other Division I team changed its institutional and athletic identities immediately after the 2017–18 season. Indiana University and Purdue University dissolved Indiana University – Purdue University Fort Wayne (IPFW) on July 1, 2018. IPFW's academic programs in health sciences transferred to the IU system as Indiana University Fort Wayne; all remaining academic programs were transferred to the Purdue system as Purdue University Fort Wayne (PFW). From 2018 to 2019, the former IPFW athletic program represents only PFW, and its Summit League membership was assumed by PFW. Shortly before the dissolution took effect, but after the school's baseball season had finished, the athletic program announced that it would henceforth be known as the Purdue Fort Wayne Mastodons.

=== NCAA tournament ===
For the first time, the 2018 NCAA Division I baseball tournament seeded the top 16 teams, rather than only the top 8 teams as had been the practice since 1999. This ensures that the regional featuring the top-seeded team is paired with the regional hosted by the 16th-seeded team, where in the past Super Regionals were paired generally along geographical lines.

== Ballpark changes ==
- Boston College opened the new 1,000-seat Brighton Field on their Brighton campus. The Eagles left their home of 57 years, Eddie Pellagrini Diamond at John Shea Field to create room for a new athletics field house.
- The 2018 season was the last for Kentucky at Cliff Hagan Stadium. The Wildcats moved into the new Kentucky Proud Park for the 2019 season.
- The 2018 season was also the last for UConn at J. O. Christian Field. The Huskies will play elsewhere for 2019 while a new stadium is built.

== Conference standings ==
2018 American Athletic Conference baseball standings
| | Conf. | | | | | | Overall |
| Team | W | | L | | T | PCT | W | | L | | T | PCT |
|---|---|---|---|---|---|---|---|---|---|---|---|---|
| Houston ‍‍‍^{y} | 16 | – | 8 | – | 0 | .667 | 33 | – | 21 | – | 0 | .611 |
| South Florida ‍‍‍^{y} | 14 | – | 9 | – | 1 | .604 | 32 | – | 18 | – | 1 | .637 |
| Connecticut ‍‍‍^{y} | 14 | – | 10 | – | 0 | .583 | 37 | – | 22 | – | 1 | .625 |
| East Carolina ‍‍‡‍^{y} | 14 | – | 10 | – | 0 | .583 | 39 | – | 15 | – | 0 | .722 |
| UCF ‍‍‍ | 13 | – | 10 | – | 0 | .565 | 35 | – | 19 | – | 0 | .648 |
| Cincinnati ‍‍‍ | 12 | – | 12 | – | 0 | .500 | 28 | – | 26 | – | 0 | .519 |
| Wichita State ‍‍‍ | 9 | – | 14 | – | 1 | .396 | 34 | – | 19 | – | 1 | .639 |
| Tulane ‍‍‍ | 9 | – | 14 | – | 0 | .391 | 24 | – | 31 | – | 0 | .436 |
| Memphis ‍‍‍ | 5 | – | 19 | – | 0 | .208 | 20 | – | 36 | – | 0 | .357 |
‡ – Tournament champion y – Invited to the NCAA tournament As of May 20, 2018; Rankings from Collegiate Baseball

2018 Atlantic Coast Conference baseball standings
| | Conf. | | | | Overall |
| Team | W | | L | PCT | W | | L | PCT |
|---|---|---|---|---|---|---|---|---|
Atlantic
| No. 17 Clemson ^{x}‍‍‍^{y} | 22 | – | 8 | .733 | 47 | – | 16 | .746 |
| No. 22 NC State ‍‍‍^{y} | 19 | – | 11 | .633 | 42 | – | 18 | .700 |
| No. 23 Louisville ‍‍‍^{y} | 18 | – | 12 | .600 | 45 | – | 19 | .703 |
| Florida State ‍‍‡‍^{y} | 16 | – | 13 | .552 | 43 | – | 19 | .694 |
| Wake Forest ‍‍‍ | 13 | – | 17 | .433 | 25 | – | 32 | .439 |
| Notre Dame ‍‍‍ | 12 | – | 18 | .400 | 24 | – | 30 | .444 |
| Boston College ‍‍‍ | 7 | – | 22 | .241 | 17 | – | 32 | .347 |
Coastal
| No. 3 North Carolina ^{x}‍‍‍^{y} | 22 | – | 8 | .733 | 44 | – | 18 | .710 |
| No. 11 Duke ‍‍‍^{y} | 18 | – | 11 | .621 | 45 | – | 18 | .714 |
| Miami (FL) ‍‍‍ | 16 | – | 13 | .552 | 28 | – | 26 | .519 |
| Georgia Tech ‍‍‍ | 14 | – | 16 | .467 | 31 | – | 27 | .534 |
| Virginia ‍‍‍ | 12 | – | 17 | .414 | 29 | – | 25 | .537 |
| Pittsburgh ‍‍‍ | 11 | – | 19 | .367 | 29 | – | 26 | .527 |
| Virginia Tech ‍‍‍ | 8 | – | 22 | .267 | 21 | – | 33 | .389 |
x – Division champion ‡ – Tournament champion y – Invited to the NCAA tournament As of June 17, 2018; Rankings from Collegiate Baseball

2018 ASUN Conference baseball standings
| | Conf. | | | | | | Overall |
| Team | W | | L | | T | PCT | W | | L | | T | PCT |
|---|---|---|---|---|---|---|---|---|---|---|---|---|
| No. 10 Stetson ‍†‍‡‍^{y} | 15 | – | 3 | – | 0 | .833 | 48 | – | 13 | – | 0 | .787 |
| Jacksonville ‍‍‍^{y} | 14 | – | 6 | – | 0 | .700 | 40 | – | 21 | – | 0 | .656 |
| Kennesaw State ‍‍‍ | 11 | – | 10 | – | 0 | .524 | 25 | – | 30 | – | 0 | .455 |
| North Florida ‍‍‍ | 10 | – | 11 | – | 0 | .476 | 28 | – | 28 | – | 0 | .500 |
| Lipscomb ‍‍‍ | 9 | – | 12 | – | 0 | .429 | 24 | – | 30 | – | 0 | .444 |
| NJIT ‍‍‍ | 9 | – | 12 | – | 0 | .429 | 22 | – | 25 | – | 0 | .468 |
| Florida Gulf Coast ‍‍‍ | 8 | – | 13 | – | 0 | .381 | 32 | – | 21 | – | 0 | .604 |
| USC Upstate ‍‍‍ | 5 | – | 14 | – | 0 | .263 | 23 | – | 28 | – | 1 | .452 |
† – Conference champion ‡ – Tournament champion y – Invited to the NCAA tournament As of June 30, 2018; Rankings from Collegiate Baseball

2018 Big East Conference baseball standings
| | Conf. | | | | | | Overall |
| Team | W | | L | | T | PCT | W | | L | | T | PCT |
|---|---|---|---|---|---|---|---|---|---|---|---|---|
| St. John's ‍‍‡‍^{y} | 15 | – | 3 | – | 0 | .833 | 36 | – | 14 | – | 0 | .720 |
| Seton Hall ‍‍‍ | 13 | – | 4 | – | 0 | .765 | 27 | – | 18 | – | 1 | .598 |
| Butler ‍‍‍ | 9 | – | 8 | – | 0 | .529 | 33 | – | 18 | – | 0 | .647 |
| Georgetown ‍‍‍ | 8 | – | 9 | – | 0 | .471 | 25 | – | 28 | – | 0 | .472 |
| Creighton ‍‍‍ | 8 | – | 9 | – | 0 | .471 | 34 | – | 16 | – | 0 | .680 |
| Xavier ‍‍‍ | 7 | – | 11 | – | 0 | .389 | 20 | – | 35 | – | 0 | .364 |
| Villanova ‍‍‍ | 1 | – | 17 | – | 0 | .056 | 9 | – | 39 | – | 0 | .188 |
‡ – Tournament champion y – Invited to the NCAA tournament As of May 20, 2018; Rankings from Collegiate Baseball

2018 Big Ten Conference baseball standings
| | Conf. | | | | Overall |
| Team | W | | L | PCT | W | | L | PCT |
|---|---|---|---|---|---|---|---|---|
| No. 15 Minnesota ‍†‍‡‍ | 18 | – | 4 | .818 | 44 | – | 13 | .772 |
| No. 27 Purdue ‍‍‍ | 17 | – | 6 | .739 | 38 | – | 21 | .644 |
| Michigan ‍‍‍ | 15 | – | 8 | .652 | 33 | – | 21 | .611 |
| Illinois ‍‍‍ | 15 | – | 9 | .625 | 33 | – | 20 | .623 |
| Indiana ‍‍‍ | 14 | – | 9 | .609 | 40 | – | 19 | .678 |
| Iowa ‍‍‍ | 13 | – | 9 | .591 | 33 | – | 20 | .623 |
| Ohio State ‍‍‍ | 14 | – | 10 | .583 | 36 | – | 24 | .600 |
| Michigan State ‍‍‍ | 11 | – | 12 | .478 | 20 | – | 32 | .385 |
| Maryland ‍‍‍ | 9 | – | 14 | .391 | 24 | – | 30 | .444 |
| Nebraska ‍‍‍ | 8 | – | 14 | .364 | 24 | – | 28 | .462 |
| Rutgers ‍‍‍ | 7 | – | 16 | .304 | 25 | – | 25 | .500 |
| Northwestern ‍‍‍ | 6 | – | 18 | .250 | 17 | – | 32 | .347 |
| Penn State ‍‍‍ | 3 | – | 21 | .125 | 15 | – | 34 | .306 |
‡ – Tournament champion As of June 24, 2023; Rankings from Collegiate Baseball

2018 Big 12 Conference baseball standings
| | Conf. | | | | | | Overall |
| Team | W | | L | | T | PCT | W | | L | | T | PCT |
|---|---|---|---|---|---|---|---|---|---|---|---|---|
| No. 7 Texas ‍†‍‍^{y} | 17 | – | 7 | – | 0 | .708 | 42 | – | 23 | – | 0 | .646 |
| Oklahoma State ‍‍‍^{y} | 16 | – | 8 | – | 0 | .667 | 31 | – | 26 | – | 1 | .543 |
| No. 6 Texas Tech ‍‍‍^{y} | 15 | – | 9 | – | 0 | .625 | 45 | – | 20 | – | 0 | .692 |
| No. 24 Oklahoma ‍‍‍^{y} | 14 | – | 10 | – | 0 | .583 | 38 | – | 25 | – | 0 | .603 |
| Baylor ‍‍‡‍^{y} | 13 | – | 11 | – | 0 | .542 | 37 | – | 21 | – | 0 | .638 |
| TCU ‍‍‍ | 10 | – | 13 | – | 0 | .435 | 33 | – | 23 | – | 0 | .589 |
| West Virginia ‍‍‍ | 9 | – | 15 | – | 0 | .375 | 29 | – | 27 | – | 0 | .518 |
| Kansas ‍‍‍ | 8 | – | 15 | – | 0 | .348 | 27 | – | 30 | – | 0 | .474 |
| Kansas State ‍‍‍ | 5 | – | 19 | – | 0 | .208 | 23 | – | 31 | – | 0 | .426 |
† – Conference champion ‡ – Tournament champion y – Invited to the NCAA tournament Rankings from Collegiate Baseball

2018 Big West Conference baseball standings
| | Conf. | | | | | | Overall |
| Team | W | | L | | T | PCT | W | | L | | T | PCT |
|---|---|---|---|---|---|---|---|---|---|---|---|---|
| Cal State Fullerton ‍†‍‍^{y} | 18 | – | 6 | – | 0 | .750 | 35 | – | 23 | – | 0 | .603 |
| Cal Poly ‍‍‍ | 15 | – | 9 | – | 0 | .625 | 30 | – | 27 | – | 0 | .526 |
| UC Irvine ‍‍‍ | 13 | – | 11 | – | 0 | .542 | 32 | – | 24 | – | 0 | .571 |
| Cal State Northridge ‍‍‍ | 13 | – | 11 | – | 0 | .542 | 28 | – | 30 | – | 0 | .483 |
| Long Beach State ‍‍‍ | 12 | – | 12 | – | 0 | .500 | 27 | – | 30 | – | 0 | .474 |
| Hawaii ‍‍‍ | 11 | – | 13 | – | 0 | .458 | 27 | – | 24 | – | 0 | .529 |
| UC Santa Barbara ‍‍‍ | 10 | – | 14 | – | 0 | .417 | 27 | – | 28 | – | 1 | .491 |
| UC Davis ‍‍‍ | 9 | – | 15 | – | 0 | .375 | 18 | – | 35 | – | 0 | .340 |
| UC Riverside ‍‍‍ | 7 | – | 17 | – | 0 | .292 | 19 | – | 33 | – | 0 | .365 |
† – Conference champion y – Invited to the NCAA tournament Rankings from Collegiate Baseball

2018 Colonial Athletic Association baseball standings
| | Conf. | | | | Overall |
| Team | W | | L | PCT | W | | L | PCT |
|---|---|---|---|---|---|---|---|---|
| Northeastern ‍†‍‍^{y} | 17 | – | 6 | .739 | 36 | – | 21 | .632 |
| Elon ‍‍‍ | 16 | – | 8 | .667 | 36 | – | 23 | .610 |
| College of Charleston ‍‍‍ | 15 | – | 8 | .652 | 36 | – | 19 | .655 |
| UNC Wilmington ‍‍‡‍^{y} | 14 | – | 9 | .609 | 39 | – | 23 | .629 |
| Delaware ‍‍‍ | 12 | – | 11 | .522 | 31 | – | 27 | .534 |
| Hofstra ‍‍‍ | 12 | – | 12 | .500 | 23 | – | 23 | .500 |
| James Madison ‍‍‍ | 11 | – | 13 | .458 | 26 | – | 26 | .500 |
| Towson ‍‍‍ | 6 | – | 18 | .250 | 13 | – | 42 | .236 |
| William & Mary ‍‍‍ | 3 | – | 21 | .125 | 15 | – | 39 | .278 |
† – Conference champion ‡ – Tournament champion y – Invited to the NCAA tournament As of June 30, 2018; Rankings from Collegiate Baseball

2018 Conference USA baseball standings
| | Conf. | | | | | | Overall |
| Team | W | | L | | T | PCT | W | | L | | T | PCT |
|---|---|---|---|---|---|---|---|---|---|---|---|---|
| No. 13 Southern Miss ‍†‍‡‍ | 23 | – | 6 | – | 0 | .793 | 39 | – | 15 | – | 0 | .722 |
| Louisiana Tech ‍‍‍ | 21 | – | 9 | – | 0 | .700 | 38 | – | 18 | – | 0 | .679 |
| Florida Atlantic ‍‍‍ | 19 | – | 8 | – | 1 | .696 | 36 | – | 15 | – | 1 | .702 |
| Charlotte ‍‍‍ | 17 | – | 13 | – | 0 | .567 | 31 | – | 22 | – | 0 | .585 |
| UTSA ‍‍‍ | 16 | – | 13 | – | 0 | .552 | 31 | – | 22 | – | 0 | .585 |
| FIU ‍‍‍ | 14 | – | 12 | – | 0 | .538 | 25 | – | 25 | – | 0 | .500 |
| Rice ‍‍‍ | 11 | – | 14 | – | 2 | .444 | 23 | – | 28 | – | 2 | .453 |
| UAB ‍‍‍ | 13 | – | 17 | – | 0 | .433 | 21 | – | 31 | – | 0 | .404 |
| Middle Tennessee ‍‍‍ | 12 | – | 17 | – | 1 | .417 | 27 | – | 27 | – | 1 | .500 |
| Western Kentucky ‍‍‍ | 11 | – | 18 | – | 0 | .379 | 21 | – | 31 | – | 0 | .404 |
| Marshall ‍‍‍ | 7 | – | 22 | – | 0 | .241 | 19 | – | 31 | – | 0 | .380 |
| Old Dominion ‍‍‍ | 7 | – | 22 | – | 0 | .241 | 15 | – | 37 | – | 0 | .288 |
† – Conference champion ‡ – Tournament champion y – Invited to the NCAA tournament Rankings from Collegiate Baseball

2018 Mid-American Conference baseball standings
| | Conf. | | | | | | Overall |
| Team | W | | L | | T | PCT | W | | L | | T | PCT |
|---|---|---|---|---|---|---|---|---|---|---|---|---|
| Kent State ‍‍‡‍^{y} | 19 | – | 8 | – | 0 | .704 | 36 | – | 16 | – | 0 | .692 |
| Miami (OH) ‍‍‍ | 17 | – | 10 | – | 0 | .630 | 33 | – | 18 | – | 0 | .647 |
| Ball State ‍‍‍ | 17 | – | 10 | – | 0 | .630 | 31 | – | 24 | – | 0 | .564 |
| Central Michigan ‍‍‍ | 16 | – | 11 | – | 0 | .593 | 25 | – | 28 | – | 1 | .472 |
| Eastern Michigan ‍‍‍ | 14 | – | 13 | – | 0 | .519 | 22 | – | 32 | – | 0 | .407 |
| Toledo ‍‍‍ | 14 | – | 13 | – | 0 | .519 | 21 | – | 31 | – | 0 | .404 |
| Western Michigan ‍‍‍ | 12 | – | 13 | – | 0 | .480 | 23 | – | 25 | – | 0 | .479 |
| Ohio ‍‍‍ | 9 | – | 18 | – | 0 | .333 | 21 | – | 32 | – | 0 | .396 |
| Northern Illinois ‍‍‍ | 8 | – | 16 | – | 0 | .333 | 20 | – | 35 | – | 0 | .364 |
| Bowling Green ‍‍‍ | 6 | – | 19 | – | 0 | .240 | 11 | – | 39 | – | 0 | .220 |
‡ – Tournament champion y – Invited to the NCAA tournament As of May 20, 2018; Rankings from Collegiate Baseball

2018 Missouri Valley Conference baseball standings
| | Conf. | | | | Overall |
| Team | W | | L | PCT | W | | L | PCT |
|---|---|---|---|---|---|---|---|---|
| No. 29 Missouri State ‍‍‍ | 18 | – | 3 | .857 | 35 | – | 15 | .700 |
| Dallas Baptist ‍‍‍ | 16 | – | 5 | .762 | 36 | – | 17 | .679 |
| Bradley ‍‍‍ | 11 | – | 10 | .524 | 30 | – | 17 | .638 |
| Indiana State ‍‍‍ | 11 | – | 10 | .524 | 29 | – | 22 | .569 |
| Southern Illinois ‍‍‍ | 10 | – | 11 | .476 | 27 | – | 28 | .491 |
| Illinois State ‍‍‍ | 9 | – | 12 | .429 | 22 | – | 28 | .440 |
| Valparaiso ‍‍‍ | 6 | – | 15 | .286 | 18 | – | 32 | .360 |
| Evansville ‍‍‍ | 3 | – | 18 | .143 | 12 | – | 37 | .245 |
‡ – Tournament champion As of May 20, 2018; Rankings from Collegiate Baseball

2018 Mountain West Conference baseball standings
| | Conf. | | | | | | Overall |
| Team | W | | L | | T | PCT | W | | L | | T | PCT |
|---|---|---|---|---|---|---|---|---|---|---|---|---|
| Nevada ‍‍‍ | 20 | – | 9 | – | 0 | .690 | 29 | – | 22 | – | 0 | .569 |
| San Diego State ‍‍‍ | 18 | – | 12 | – | 0 | .600 | 36 | – | 19 | – | 0 | .655 |
| San Jose State ‍‍‍ | 16 | – | 14 | – | 0 | .533 | 26 | – | 28 | – | 0 | .481 |
| UNLV ‍‍‍ | 14 | – | 16 | – | 0 | .467 | 33 | – | 22 | – | 0 | .600 |
| Fresno State ‍‍‍ | 13 | – | 17 | – | 0 | .433 | 30 | – | 24 | – | 0 | .556 |
| Air Force ‍‍‍ | 12 | – | 17 | – | 0 | .414 | 24 | – | 30 | – | 0 | .444 |
| New Mexico ‍‍‍ | 11 | – | 19 | – | 0 | .367 | 19 | – | 33 | – | 1 | .368 |
As of May 20, 2018; Rankings from Collegiate Baseball

2018 Ohio Valley Conference baseball standings
| | Conf. | | | | Overall |
| Team | W | | L | PCT | W | | L | PCT |
|---|---|---|---|---|---|---|---|---|
| No. 22 Tennessee Tech ‍‍‍ | 27 | – | 3 | .900 | 46 | – | 7 | .868 |
| Southeast Missouri State ‍‍‍ | 20 | – | 10 | .667 | 26 | – | 28 | .481 |
| Morehead State ‍‍‍ | 18 | – | 12 | .600 | 32 | – | 23 | .582 |
| Jacksonville State ‍‍‍ | 18 | – | 12 | .600 | 30 | – | 23 | .566 |
| Austin Peay ‍‍‍ | 17 | – | 13 | .567 | 30 | – | 25 | .545 |
| Eastern Kentucky ‍‍‍ | 15 | – | 15 | .500 | 27 | – | 29 | .482 |
| Murray State ‍‍‍ | 13 | – | 16 | .448 | 26 | – | 27 | .491 |
| Eastern Illinois ‍‍‍ | 12 | – | 18 | .400 | 23 | – | 30 | .434 |
| Belmont ‍‍‍ | 11 | – | 19 | .367 | 19 | – | 36 | .345 |
| UT Martin ‍‍‍ | 7 | – | 22 | .241 | 11 | – | 40 | .216 |
| SIU Edwardsville ‍‍‍ | 6 | – | 24 | .200 | 15 | – | 37 | .288 |
As of May 20, 2018; Rankings from Collegiate Baseball

2018 Pac-12 Conference baseball standings
| | Conf. | | | | | | Overall |
| Team | W | | L | | T | PCT | W | | L | | T | PCT |
|---|---|---|---|---|---|---|---|---|---|---|---|---|
| No. 18 Stanford ‍†‍‍^{y} | 22 | – | 8 | – | 0 | .733 | 46 | – | 12 | – | 0 | .793 |
| No. 1 Oregon State ‍‍‍^{y} | 20 | – | 9 | – | 1 | .683 | 55 | – | 12 | – | 1 | .816 |
| No. 8 Washington ‍‍‍^{y} | 20 | – | 10 | – | 0 | .667 | 35 | – | 26 | – | 0 | .574 |
| No. 25 UCLA ‍‍‍^{y} | 19 | – | 11 | – | 0 | .633 | 38 | – | 21 | – | 0 | .644 |
| California ‍‍‍ | 16 | – | 14 | – | 0 | .533 | 32 | – | 22 | – | 0 | .593 |
| Arizona ‍‍‍ | 14 | – | 16 | – | 0 | .467 | 34 | – | 22 | – | 0 | .607 |
| Arizona State ‍‍‍ | 13 | – | 17 | – | 0 | .433 | 23 | – | 32 | – | 0 | .418 |
| Southern California ‍‍‍ | 12 | – | 18 | – | 0 | .400 | 26 | – | 28 | – | 0 | .481 |
| Oregon ‍‍‍ | 12 | – | 18 | – | 0 | .400 | 26 | – | 29 | – | 0 | .473 |
| Washington State ‍‍‍ | 8 | – | 21 | – | 1 | .283 | 16 | – | 33 | – | 1 | .330 |
| Utah ‍‍‍ | 8 | – | 22 | – | 0 | .267 | 16 | – | 39 | – | 0 | .291 |
† – Conference champion y – Invited to the NCAA tournament As of June 29, 2018; Rankings from Collegiate Baseball

2018 Southeastern Conference baseball standings
| | Conf. | | | | Overall |
| Team | W | | L | PCT | W | | L | PCT |
|---|---|---|---|---|---|---|---|---|
East Division
| No. 3 Florida ^{x}‍†‍‍^{y} | 20 | – | 10 | .667 | 49 | – | 21 | .700 |
| No. 20 Georgia ‍‍‍^{y} | 18 | – | 12 | .600 | 39 | – | 21 | .650 |
| No. 12 South Carolina ‍‍‍^{y} | 17 | – | 13 | .567 | 37 | – | 26 | .587 |
| No. 16 Vanderbilt ‍‍‍^{y} | 16 | – | 14 | .533 | 35 | – | 27 | .565 |
| Kentucky ‍‍‍ | 13 | – | 17 | .433 | 34 | – | 22 | .607 |
| Missouri ‍‍‍ | 12 | – | 18 | .400 | 34 | – | 22 | .607 |
| Tennessee ‍‍‍ | 12 | – | 18 | .400 | 29 | – | 27 | .518 |
West Division
| No. 19 Ole Miss ^{x}‍‍‡‍^{y} | 18 | – | 12 | .600 | 48 | – | 18 | .727 |
| No. 2 Arkansas ^{x}‍‍‍^{y} | 18 | – | 12 | .600 | 48 | – | 21 | .696 |
| No. 15 Auburn ‍‍‍^{y} | 15 | – | 15 | .500 | 43 | – | 23 | .652 |
| LSU ‍‍‍^{y} | 15 | – | 15 | .500 | 39 | – | 27 | .591 |
| No. 4 Mississippi State ‍‍‍^{y} | 15 | – | 15 | .500 | 39 | – | 29 | .574 |
| Texas A&M ‍‍‍^{y} | 13 | – | 17 | .433 | 40 | – | 22 | .645 |
| Alabama ‍‍‍ | 8 | – | 22 | .267 | 27 | – | 29 | .482 |
x – Division champion † – Conference champion ‡ – Tournament champion y – Invited to the NCAA tournament Rankings from Collegiate Baseball

2018 Southern Conference baseball standings
| | Conf. | | | | Overall |
| Team | W | | L | PCT | W | | L | PCT |
|---|---|---|---|---|---|---|---|---|
| UNC Greensboro ‍‍‍ | 18 | – | 3 | .857 | 37 | – | 13 | .740 |
| Samford ‍‍‍ | 16 | – | 8 | .667 | 32 | – | 24 | .571 |
| Wofford ‍‍‍ | 15 | – | 9 | .625 | 35 | – | 21 | .625 |
| VMI ‍‍‍ | 12 | – | 12 | .500 | 26 | – | 25 | .510 |
| Mercer ‍‍‍ | 11 | – | 13 | .458 | 35 | – | 20 | .636 |
| East Tennessee State ‍‍‍ | 11 | – | 13 | .458 | 27 | – | 23 | .540 |
| Furman ‍‍‍ | 9 | – | 12 | .429 | 24 | – | 26 | .480 |
| The Citadel ‍‍‍ | 8 | – | 16 | .333 | 19 | – | 33 | .365 |
| Western Carolina ‍‍‍ | 5 | – | 19 | .208 | 7 | – | 45 | .135 |
‡ – Tournament champion As of May 19, 2018; Rankings from Collegiate Baseball

2018 Southland Conference baseball standings
| | Conf. | | | | Overall |
| Team | W | | L | PCT | W | | L | PCT |
|---|---|---|---|---|---|---|---|---|
| Sam Houston St ‍†‍‍ | 24 | – | 6 | .800 | 39 | – | 20 | .661 |
| Southeastern Louisiana ‍‍‍ | 21 | – | 9 | .700 | 37 | – | 22 | .627 |
| Northwestern State ‍‍‡‍^{y} | 18 | – | 12 | .600 | 37 | – | 22 | .627 |
| Houston Baptist ‍‍‍ | 18 | – | 12 | .600 | 29 | – | 30 | .492 |
| Central Arkansas ‍‍‍ | 17 | – | 13 | .567 | 32 | – | 25 | .561 |
| McNeese State ‍‍‍ | 15 | – | 15 | .500 | 25 | – | 33 | .431 |
| Texas A&M–Corpus Christi ‍‍‍ | 14 | – | 16 | .467 | 30 | – | 26 | .536 |
| New Orleans ‍‍‍ | 14 | – | 16 | .467 | 29 | – | 32 | .475 |
| Nicholls State ‍‍‍ | 14 | – | 16 | .467 | 28 | – | 32 | .467 |
| Incarnate Word ‍‍‍ | 13 | – | 17 | .433 | 29 | – | 26 | .527 |
| Lamar ‍‍‍ | 13 | – | 17 | .433 | 19 | – | 36 | .345 |
| Stephen F. Austin ‍‍‍ | 9 | – | 21 | .300 | 17 | – | 36 | .321 |
| Abilene Christian ‍‍‍ | 5 | – | 25 | .167 | 21 | – | 33 | .389 |
† – Conference champion ‡ – Tournament champion y – Invited to the NCAA tournament Rankings from Collegiate Baseball

2018 Summit League baseball standings
| | Conf. | | | | Overall |
| Team | W | | L | PCT | W | | L | PCT |
|---|---|---|---|---|---|---|---|---|
| Oral Roberts ‍‍‍ | 24 | – | 6 | .800 | 35 | – | 18 | .660 |
| Western Illinois ‍‍‍ | 14 | – | 12 | .538 | 17 | – | 28 | .378 |
| North Dakota State ‍‍‍ | 15 | – | 13 | .536 | 25 | – | 22 | .532 |
| South Dakota State ‍‍‍ | 14 | – | 13 | .519 | 16 | – | 30 | .348 |
| Omaha ‍‍‍ | 10 | – | 17 | .370 | 15 | – | 35 | .300 |
| Fort Wayne ‍‍‍ | 7 | – | 23 | .233 | 11 | – | 37 | .229 |
‡ – Tournament champion As of May 20, 2018; Rankings from Collegiate Baseball

2018 Sun Belt Conference baseball standings
| | Conf. | | | | | | Overall |
| Team | W | | L | | T | PCT | W | | L | | T | PCT |
|---|---|---|---|---|---|---|---|---|---|---|---|---|
East Division
| No. 21 Coastal Carolina ^{x}‍‍‡‍^{y} | 23 | – | 7 | – | 0 | .767 | 38 | – | 17 | – | 0 | .691 |
| Troy ‍‍‍^{y} | 19 | – | 11 | – | 0 | .633 | 38 | – | 18 | – | 0 | .679 |
| South Alabama ‍‍‍ | 18 | – | 11 | – | 0 | .621 | 30 | – | 23 | – | 0 | .566 |
| Georgia Southern ‍‍‍ | 18 | – | 11 | – | 0 | .621 | 29 | – | 24 | – | 0 | .547 |
| Georgia State ‍‍‍ | 10 | – | 19 | – | 0 | .345 | 26 | – | 28 | – | 0 | .481 |
| Appalachian State ‍‍‍ | 9 | – | 21 | – | 0 | .300 | 18 | – | 36 | – | 0 | .333 |
West Division
| Louisiana ^{x}‍‍‍ | 18 | – | 12 | – | 0 | .600 | 33 | – | 23 | – | 0 | .589 |
| Texas State ‍‍‍ | 16 | – | 14 | – | 0 | .533 | 28 | – | 26 | – | 1 | .518 |
| Little Rock ‍‍‍ | 15 | – | 14 | – | 0 | .517 | 28 | – | 25 | – | 0 | .528 |
| Arkansas State ‍‍‍ | 11 | – | 19 | – | 0 | .367 | 20 | – | 30 | – | 0 | .400 |
| UT Arlington ‍‍‍ | 11 | – | 19 | – | 0 | .367 | 21 | – | 33 | – | 0 | .389 |
| Louisiana–Monroe ‍‍‍ | 10 | – | 20 | – | 0 | .333 | 23 | – | 31 | – | 0 | .426 |
x – Division champion ‡ – Tournament champion y – Invited to the NCAA tournament As of May 20, 2018; Rankings from Collegiate Baseball

2018 West Coast Conference baseball standings
| | Conf. | | | | Overall |
| Team | W | | L | PCT | W | | L | PCT |
|---|---|---|---|---|---|---|---|---|
| Pepperdine ‍†‍‍ | 17 | – | 10 | .630 | 31 | – | 24 | .564 |
| Gonzaga ‍‍‡‍^{y} | 16 | – | 11 | .593 | 33 | – | 24 | .579 |
| San Francisco ‍‍‍ | 15 | – | 12 | .556 | 28 | – | 30 | .483 |
| Loyola Marymount ‍‍‍ | 14 | – | 12 | .538 | 25 | – | 30 | .455 |
| Saint Mary's ‍‍‍ | 14 | – | 13 | .519 | 31 | – | 23 | .574 |
| Santa Clara ‍‍‍ | 12 | – | 15 | .444 | 26 | – | 26 | .500 |
| Portland ‍‍‍ | 12 | – | 15 | .444 | 23 | – | 30 | .434 |
| San Diego ‍‍‍ | 12 | – | 15 | .444 | 23 | – | 32 | .418 |
| Pacific ‍‍‍ | 11 | – | 16 | .407 | 22 | – | 27 | .449 |
| BYU ‍‍‍ | 11 | – | 16 | .407 | 22 | – | 28 | .440 |
† – Conference champion ‡ – Tournament champion y – Invited to the NCAA tournament As of Jun 3, 2018; Rankings from Collegiate Baseball

2018 Western Athletic Conference baseball standings
| | Conf. | | | | Overall |
| Team | W | | L | PCT | W | | L | PCT |
|---|---|---|---|---|---|---|---|---|
| Grand Canyon ‍‍‍ | 19 | – | 5 | .792 | 33 | – | 22 | .600 |
| New Mexico State ‍‍‍ | 17 | – | 7 | .708 | 36 | – | 19 | .655 |
| Sacramento State ‍‍‍ | 17 | – | 7 | .708 | 31 | – | 23 | .574 |
| Seattle ‍‍‍ | 13 | – | 11 | .542 | 32 | – | 21 | .604 |
| Northern Colorado ‍‍‍ | 11 | – | 13 | .458 | 29 | – | 22 | .569 |
| Cal State Bakersfield ‍‍‍ | 10 | – | 14 | .417 | 20 | – | 34 | .370 |
| Texas–Rio Grande Valley ‍‍‍ | 8 | – | 16 | .333 | 23 | – | 31 | .426 |
| Chicago State ‍‍‍ | 7 | – | 17 | .292 | 13 | – | 41 | .241 |
| Utah Valley ‍‍‍ | 6 | – | 18 | .250 | 15 | – | 37 | .288 |
‡ – Tournament champion As of May 20, 2018; Rankings from Collegiate Baseball

=== Conference winners and tournaments ===
Of the 31 Division I athletic conferences that sponsor baseball, 29 end their regular seasons with a single-elimination tournament or a double elimination tournament. The teams in each conference that win their regular season title are given the number one seed in each tournament. Two conferences, the Big West and Pac-12, do not hold a conference tournament. The winners of these tournaments, plus the Big West and Pac-12 regular-season champions, receive automatic invitations to the 2018 NCAA Division I baseball tournament.

| Conference | Regular season winner | Conference Player of the Year | Conference Pitcher of the Year | Conference Coach of the Year | Conference tournament | Tournament Venue • City | Tournament winner |
|---|---|---|---|---|---|---|---|
| America East Conference | Hartford | Nick Campana, Hartford | Nicholas Dombkowski, Hartford | Justin Blood, Hartford | 2018 America East Conference baseball tournament | Mahaney Diamond • Orono, ME | Hartford |
| American Athletic Conference | Houston | Bryant Packard, East Carolina | Aaron Fletcher, Houston | Todd Whitting, Houston | 2018 American Athletic Conference baseball tournament | Spectrum Field • Clearwater, FL | East Carolina |
| Atlantic 10 Conference | Saint Louis | Isaiah Pasteur, George Washington | Miller Hogan, Saint Louis | Darin Hendrickson, Saint Louis | 2018 Atlantic 10 Conference baseball tournament | Tucker Field at Barcroft Park • Arlington, VA | Saint Louis |
| Atlantic Coast Conference | Atlantic - Clemson; Coastal - North Carolina | Joey Bart, Georgia Tech | Brian Brown, NC State | Mike Fox, NC State | 2018 Atlantic Coast Conference baseball tournament | Durham Bulls Athletic Park • Durham, NC | Florida State |
| Atlantic Sun Conference | Stetson | Brooks Wilson, Stetson | Logan Gilbert, Stetson | Steve Trimper, Stetson | 2018 Atlantic Sun Conference baseball tournament | Harmon Stadium • Jacksonville, FL | Stetson |
| Big 12 Conference | Texas | Kody Clemens, Texas | Cody Bradford, Baylor | David Pierce, Texas | 2018 Big 12 Conference baseball tournament | Chickasaw Bricktown Ballpark • Oklahoma City, OK | Baylor |
| Big East Conference | St. John's | John Valente, St. John's | Ricky DeVito, Seton Hall | Ed Blankmeyer, St. John's (Note: The Big East awards a Coaching Staff of the Year award instead of a Coach of the Year award. It goes to the team instead of an individual, although the head coach is cited by name in the award announcement.) | 2018 Big East Conference baseball tournament | Prasco Park • Mason, OH | St. John's |
| Big South Conference | Campbell | Austin Zente, High Point | Allan Winans, Campbell | Justin Haire, Campbell | 2018 Big South Conference baseball tournament | Liberty Baseball Stadium • Lynchburg, VA | Campbell |
| Big Ten Conference | Minnesota | Bren Spillane, Illinois | Patrick Fredrickson, Minnesota | John Anderson, Minnesota | 2018 Big Ten Conference baseball tournament | TD Ameritrade Park • Omaha, NE | Minnesota |
| Big West Conference | Cal State Fullerton | Alex McKenna, Cal Poly (Note: The Big West styles its Player of the Year award as "Field Player of the Year".) | Colton Eastman, Cal State Fullerton | Rick Vanderhook, Cal State Fullerton | No tournament, regular season champion earns auto bid | | Cal State Fullerton |
| Colonial Athletic Association | Northeastern | Charlie McConnell, Northeastern | John Rooney, Hofstra | Mike Glavine, Northeastern | 2018 Colonial Athletic Association baseball tournament | Eagle Field at Veterans Memorial Park • Harrisonburg, VA | UNC Willmington |
| Conference USA | Southern Miss | Luke Reynolds, Southern Miss | Nick Sandlin, Southern Miss | Scott Berry, Southern Miss | 2018 Conference USA baseball tournament | MGM Park • Biloxi, MS | Southern Miss |
| Horizon League | Wright State | Gabe Snyder, Wright State | Ryan Campbell, UIC (starting); Charlie Cerny, UIC (relief) (Note: The Horizon League is the only Division I conference that presents separate season-ending awards for starting and relief pitchers. The award for starters is styled as the "Pitcher of the Year" award.) | Jeff Mercer, Wright State | 2018 Horizon League baseball tournament | Hosted by regular-season champion | Wright State |
| Ivy League | Yale | Dustin Shirley, Dartmouth | Noah Zavolas, Harvard | Brett Boretti, Columbia | 2018 Ivy League Baseball Championship Series | Campus sites | Columbia |
| Metro Atlantic Athletic Conference | Monmouth | Greg Cullen, Niagara | J. P. Stevenson, Canisius | John Delaney, Quinnipiac | 2018 Metro Atlantic Athletic Conference baseball tournament | Richmond County Bank Ballpark • Staten Island, NY | Canisius |
| Mid-American Conference | Kent State | Rudy Rott, Ohio | Joey Murray, Kent State | Jeff Duncan, Kent State | 2018 Mid-American Conference baseball tournament | Sprenger Stadium • Avon, OH | Kent State |
| Mid-Eastern Athletic Conference | Northern - Coppin State; Southern - North Carolina A&T | Corey Joyce, North Carolina Central | Anthony Maldonado, Bethune–Cookman | Sherman Reed, Coppin State | 2018 Mid-Eastern Athletic Conference baseball tournament | Jackie Robinson Ballpark • Daytona Beach, FL | North Carolina A&T |
| Missouri Valley Conference | Missouri State | Devlin Granberg, Dallas Baptist | Trevor Conn, Dallas Baptist | Keith Guttin, Missouri State | 2018 Missouri Valley Conference baseball tournament | Horner Ballpark • Dallas, TX | Missouri State |
| Mountain West Conference | Nevada | Grant Fennell, Nevada | Garrett Hill, San Diego State & Andrew Mitchel, San Jose State | T. J. Bruce, Nevada | 2018 Mountain West Conference baseball tournament | Tony Gwynn Stadium • San Diego, CA | San Diego State |
| Northeast Conference | Wagner | Ryan Ward, Bryant | Jack Patterson, Bryant | Jim Carone, Wagner | 2018 Northeast Conference baseball tournament | Dodd Stadium • Norwich, CT | LIU Brooklyn |
| Ohio Valley Conference | Tennessee Tech | Kevin Strohschein, Tennessee Tech | Travis Moths, Tennessee Tech | Matt Bragga, Tennessee Tech | 2018 Ohio Valley Conference baseball tournament | Choccolocco Park • Oxford, AL | Morehead State |
| Pac–12 Conference | Stanford | Andrew Vaughn, California | Luke Heimlich, Oregon State | David Esquer, Stanford | No tournament, regular season champion earns auto bid | | Stanford |
| Patriot League | Army/Navy | Jon Rosoff, Army | Connor Van Hoose, Bucknell | Paul Kostacopoulos, Navy | 2018 Patriot League baseball tournament | Campus sites | Army |
| Southeastern Conference | East - Florida; West - Ole Miss/Arkansas | Jonathan India, Florida | Brady Singer, Florida | Kevin O'Sullivan, Florida | 2018 Southeastern Conference baseball tournament | Hoover Metropolitan Stadium • Hoover, AL | Ole Miss |
| Southern Conference | UNC Greensboro | Andrew Moritz, UNC Greensboro | Matt Frisbee, UNC Greensboro | Link Jarrett, UNC Greensboro | 2018 Southern Conference baseball tournament | Fluor Field • Greenville, SC | Samford |
| Southland Conference | Sam Houston State | David Fry, Northwestern State | Tyler Gray, Central Arkansas | Bobby Barbier, Northwestern State | 2018 Southland Conference baseball tournament | Constellation Field • Sugar Land, TX | Northwestern State |
| Southwestern Athletic Conference | East - Alabama State; West - Texas Southern | Kamren Dukes, Texas Southern | Aaron Solis, Texas Southern | Jose Vazquez, Alabama State | 2018 Southwestern Athletic Conference baseball tournament | Wesley Barrow Stadium • New Orleans, LA | Texas Southern |
| Summit League | Oral Roberts | Noah Cummings, Oral Roberts | Miguel Ausua, Oral Roberts | Ryan Folmar, Oral Roberts | 2018 Summit League baseball tournament | J. L. Johnson Stadium • Tulsa, OK | Oral Roberts |
| Sun Belt Conference | East - Coastal Carolina; West - Louisiana | Joey Denison, Troy | Colten Schmidt, Louisiana | Gary Gilmore, Coastal Carolina | 2018 Sun Belt Conference baseball tournament | M. L. Tigue Moore Field • Lafayette, LA | Coastal Carolina |
| West Coast Conference | Pepperdine | Jordan Qsar, Pepperdine | Jonathan Pendergast, Pepperdine | Rick Hirtensteiner, Pepperdine | 2018 West Coast Conference baseball tournament | Banner Island Ballpark • Stockton, CA | Gonzaga |
| Western Athletic Conference | Grand Canyon | Quin Cotton, Grand Canyon | Jonathan Groff, New Mexico State | Andy Stankiewicz, Grand Canyon | 2018 Western Athletic Conference baseball tournament | Hohokam Stadium • Mesa, AZ | New Mexico State |

== College World Series ==
The 2018 College World Series began on June 16 in Omaha, Nebraska.

First round
1 | Florida | 3
9 | Texas Tech | 6
5 | Arkansas | 11
13 | Texas | 5
1 | Florida | 6
13 | Texas | 1
3 | Oregon State | 6
6 | North Carolina | 8
Mississippi State | 1
Washington | 0
3 | Oregon State | 14
Washington | 5

Second round
9 | Texas Tech | 4
5 | Arkansas | 7
1 | Florida | 9
9 | Texas Tech | 6
6 | North Carolina | 2
Mississippi State | 12
3 | Oregon State | 11
6 | North Carolina | 6

Semifinals
5 | Arkansas | 5 | –
1 | Florida | 2 | –
Mississippi State | 2 | 2
3 | Oregon State | 12 | 5

Championship
5 | Arkansas | 4 | 3 | 0
3 | Oregon State | 1 | 5 | 5

== Coaching changes ==
This table lists programs that changed head coaches at any point from the first day of the 2018 season until the day before the first day of the 2019 season.

| Team | Former coach | Interim coach | New coach | Reason |
|---|---|---|---|---|
| Abilene Christian | Britt Bonneau | | Rick McCarty | Bonneau resigned from Abilene Christian on May 19 after 22 seasons. On June 12, the Wildcats hired former Dallas Baptist pitching coach McCarty for the head coaching job. |
| Alabama A&M | Mitch Hill | | Manny Lora | Hill resigned from Alabama A&M on June 25 after 5 seasons for the head coaching job at Martin Methodist College of the NAIA. Pitching coach and recruiting coordinator Lora was promoted to head coach of the Bulldogs on August 23. |
| Central Michigan | Steve Jaska | | Jordan Bischel | Jaska announced his retirement after 16 seasons at Central Michigan on June 2. On June 28, the Chippewas hired Bischel from Division II Northwood. |
| Davidson | Dick Cooke | | Rucker Taylor | Cooke announced on February 12 that he will step down following the 2018 season with associate head coach Rucker succeeding him. |
| Fairleigh Dickinson | Gary Puccio | Justin McKay | | Puccio announced his retirement after 8 seasons at FDU and 27 seasons overall, effective May 15. Assistant coach McKay will serve as the interim head coach of the Knights for the 2019 season. |
| Illinois State | Bo Durkac | | Steve Holm | Durkac was fired on May 29 after 4 seasons at Illinois State, finishing 82–134 overall and 27–55 in conference play. On June 22, the Redbirds hired Purdue pitching coach Holm for the head coaching job. |
| Indiana | Chris Lemonis | | Jeff Mercer | Lemonis left after 4 seasons at Indiana to take the Mississippi State job. The school hired Wright State head coach Jeff Mercer on July 2. |
| Iona | Pat Carey | | Paul Panik | On May 15 it was announced that Pat Carey will not return to the team for the 2019 season after thirteen years with the school. The school hired Albany assistant Paul Panik on June 25. |
| Kansas State | Brad Hill | | Pete Hughes | Brad Hill Announced that on May 8 after fifteen seasons that he will step down affective at the end of the season. He became the team's all-time most successful coach and won the 2013 Big 12 Conference title and hosted a super regional that year. On June 8, the Wildcats hired former Boston College, Virginia Tech, and Oklahoma head coach Pete Hughes. |
| Miami (FL) | Jim Morris | | Gino DiMare | Morris announced in June 2014 that he would retire after the 2018 season, and that DiMare would take over as head coach at that time. |
| Middle Tennessee | Jim McGuire | | Jim Toman | McGuire was fired on May 21 after 6 seasons at Middle Tennessee. On June 20, the Blue Raiders hired Charleston associate head coach and former Liberty head coach Toman for the job. |
| Mississippi State | Andy Cannizaro | Gary Henderson | Chris Lemonis | Cannizaro resigned on February 22, only three games into the Bulldogs' season, after he was found to be involved in an extramarital affair with a woman working in MSU's athletic department. Former Kentucky head coach and current MSU pitching coach Henderson was named as interim replacement. MSU announced the hiring of Indiana head coach Chris Lemonis on June 26. |
| Murray State | Kevin Moulder | | Dan Skirka | Murray State announced on May 25 that Moulder would not return next season, ending his 4-year tenure at the school. On July 2, the school hired former Racer assistant coach Skirka to be the new head coach. |
| Oregon State | Pat Casey | Pat Bailey | | Casey announced his retirement on September 6 after 24 seasons at Oregon State and 30 seasons overall, winning 900 games with the Beavers and 3 NCAA championships. Associate head coach Bailey will serve as the interim head coach of the team for the 2019 season. |
| Pittsburgh | Joe Jordano | | Mike Bell | Jordano resigned from Pittsburgh on June 22 after 21 seasons at the helm. On July 10, former Florida State pitching coach Bell was named head coach of the Panthers. |
| Rice | Wayne Graham | | Matt Bragga | Graham, who was the oldest head coach in Division I baseball at age 82, announced on April 25 that his contract was not being renewed and that the 2018 season would be the last of his 27-year head coaching tenure at Rice. The Owls hired Tennessee Tech head coach Bragga after the season. |
| Tennessee Tech | Matt Bragga | | Justin Holmes | Bragga left after 15 seasons at Tennessee Tech to take the Rice job. The school promoted assistant coach and recruiting coordinator Justin Holmes on June 21. |
| UC Irvine | Mike Gillespie | | Ben Orloff | Mike Gillespie announced his retirement from the UC Irvine baseball team after eleven seasons with the school his successor Ben Orloff was named his replacement beginning in the 2019 season. He became the most successful coach in College baseball history with 1108 wins. |
| Wright State | Jeff Mercer | | Alex Sogard | Mercer left after 2 seasons at Wright State to take the Indiana job. The school promoted assistant coach Alex Sogard on July 6. |
