= Frady =

Frady is an uncommon surname. Frady is of American origin, likely translated from the German "Vrede."

It may refer to the following notable people:

- Greg Frady (born 1962), American college baseball coach
- Marshall Frady (1940–2004), American journalist and author
- Nicole Lane Frady (born 1983), American musician
