= 2018 Georgia State Panthers baseball team =

American college baseball season

2018 Georgia State Panthers baseball
- Conference: Sun Belt Conference
- East Division
- Record: 26–29 (10–19 SBC)
- Head coach: Greg Frady (11th season)
- Home stadium: GSU Baseball Complex

2018 Sun Belt Conference baseball standings
	Conf.						Overall
Team	W		L		T	PCT	W		L		T	PCT
East Division
No. 21 Coastal Carolina ^{x}‍‍‡‍^{y}	23	–	7	–	0	.767	38	–	17	–	0	.691
Troy ‍‍‍^{y}	19	–	11	–	0	.633	38	–	18	–	0	.679
South Alabama ‍‍‍	18	–	11	–	0	.621	30	–	23	–	0	.566
Georgia Southern ‍‍‍	18	–	11	–	0	.621	29	–	24	–	0	.547
Georgia State ‍‍‍	10	–	19	–	0	.345	26	–	28	–	0	.481
Appalachian State ‍‍‍	9	–	21	–	0	.300	18	–	36	–	0	.333
West Division
Louisiana ^{x}‍‍‍	18	–	12	–	0	.600	33	–	23	–	0	.589
Texas State ‍‍‍	16	–	14	–	0	.533	28	–	26	–	1	.518
Little Rock ‍‍‍	15	–	14	–	0	.517	28	–	25	–	0	.528
Arkansas State ‍‍‍	11	–	19	–	0	.367	20	–	30	–	0	.400
UT Arlington ‍‍‍	11	–	19	–	0	.367	21	–	33	–	0	.389
Louisiana–Monroe ‍‍‍	10	–	20	–	0	.333	23	–	31	–	0	.426
x – Division champion ‡ – Tournament champion y – Invited to the NCAA tournament As of May 20, 2018; Rankings from Collegiate Baseball

The 2018 Georgia State Panthers baseball team represented Georgia State University in the 2018 NCAA Division I baseball season. The Panthers played their home games at the GSU Baseball Complex.

== Personnel ==
=== Roster ===
2018 Georgia State Panthers roster
Pitchers: 2 Rhett Harper – Senior; 6 Jordan Lee – Senior; 11 Brandon Baker – (redshirt) Senior; 17 Tyler Elwer – (redshirt) Senior; 22 Hunter Gaddis – Sophomore; 26 Tanner Thomson – Senior; 28 Bryan White – (redshirt) Senior; 33 Jansen Acton – Senior; 35 Will White – (redshirt) Junior; 38 Tyler Koch – Sophomore; 40 Liam Henry – (redshirt) Junior; Trey Horton – Freshman; Jake Rogers – Junior; A.J. Rolle – Junior; Craig Williams – (redshirt) Junior	Catchers: 5 Nick Gatewood – Junior; Tanner Gallman – Freshman; Kevin Mooney – Freshman; Infielders: 1 Justin Jones – Senior; 3 Kendall Ford – (redshirt) Senior; 4 Mike Huggins – Senior; 15 Will Kilgore – Junior; 21 Romero Greer – Senior; 34 Jack Thompson – Senior; Brandon Bell – Junior; Griffin Cheney - Freshman; Jake Corso – Junior; Stephen Cullen – Freshman; Ryan Glass – Freshman; Kalen Puckett – Freshman	Outfielders: 2 Rhett Harper – Senior; 9 Terrell Frazier – Sophomore; 12 Luke Leonard – (redshirt) Junior; 24 Darius Sewell – Junior; Joah Curry – Freshman; Enrique Ferrer – Junior; Tervont Johnson – (redshirt) Freshman; Andrew Keene – Freshman

=== Coaching staff ===
2018 Georgia State Panthers baseball coaching staff
- 10 Greg Frady – Head coach – 11th year
- NA Josh Davis – Assistant coach – 1st year
- NA Adam Pavkovich – Assistant coach/Recruiting coordinator – 3rd year
- NA Steve Rosen – Assistant coach – 1st year

== Schedule ==
2018 Georgia State Panthers baseball game log
Regular season
February

#	Date	Opponent	Venue	Score	Overall Record	SBC Record
1	February 16	Bradley	GSU Baseball Complex	W 3–1	1–0	–
2	February 17	Connecticut	GSU Baseball Complex	L 1–10	1–1	–
3	February 18	Minnesota	GSU Baseball Complex	W 9–6	2–1	–
4	February 20	Auburn	Auburn, AL	L 2–3	2–2	–
5	February 23	Jacksonville	GSU Baseball Complex	W 6–2	3–2	–
6	February 24	Jacksonville	Jacksonville, FL	W 7–0	4–2	–
7	February 25	Jacksonville	Jacksonville, FL	L 3–5	4–3	–
8	February 28	Georgia	Athens, GA	Cancelled	–	–

March

#	Date	Opponent	Venue	Score	Overall Record	SBC Record
9	March 2	Eastern Illinois	GSU Baseball Complex	W 7–2	5–3	–
10	March 3	Eastern Illinois	GSU Baseball Complex	W 8–2	6–3	–
11	March 4	Eastern Illinois	GSU Baseball Complex	W 6–5	7–3	–
12	March 6	Morehouse	GSU Baseball Complex	W 7–4	8–3	–
12	March 7	Georgia Tech	Atlanta, GA	L 6–12	8–4	–
13	March 9	Samford	Birmingham, AL	W 2–0	9–4	–
14	March 10	Samford	Birmingham, AL	W 1–0	10–4	–
15	March 11	Samford	Birmingham, AL	W 9–7	11–4	–
16	March 13	Ole Miss	GSU Baseball Complex	L 5–3	11–5	–
17	March 14	Ole Miss	GSU Baseball Complex	L 16–2	11–6	–
18	March 16	UT Arlington	Arlington, TX	L 4–6	11–7	0–1
19	March 17	UT Arlington	Arlington, TX	L 10–12	11–8	0–2
20	March 18	UT Arlington	Arlington, TX	L 5–6	11–9	0–3
21	March 20	Georgia	GSU Baseball Complex	L 2–12	11–10	0–3
22	March 23	South Alabama	GSU Baseball Complex	W 7–2	12–10	1–3
23	March 24	South Alabama	GSU Baseball Complex	L 4–12	12–11	1–4
24	March 25	South Alabama	GSU Baseball Complex	Cancelled	–	–
25	March 27	Kennesaw State	GSU Baseball Complex	L 9–15	12–12	1–4
26	March 29	Troy	Troy, AL	L 4–14	12–13	1–5
27	March 30	Troy	Troy, AL	W 5–2	13–13	2–5
28	March 31	Troy	Troy, AL	L 3–8	13–14	2–6

April

#	Date	Opponent	Venue	Score	Overall Record	SBC Record
29	April 4	Furman	Greenville, SC	L 12–13	13–15	2–6
30	April 6	Arkansas State	GSU Baseball Complex	W 12–3	14–15	3–6
31	April 7	Arkansas State	GSU Baseball Complex	W 16–7	15–15	4–6
32	April 8	Arkansas State	GSU Baseball Complex	W 3–2	16–15	5–6
33	April 11	Georgia Tech	GSU Baseball Complex	W 5–2	17–15	5–6
34	April 13	Texas State	GSU Baseball Complex	L 9–10	17–16	5–7
35	April 14	Texas State	GSU Baseball Complex	L 5–10	17–17	5–8
36	April 15	Texas State	GSU Baseball Complex	L 3–9	17–18	5–9
37	April 18	Mercer	GSU Baseball Complex	W 4–2	18–18	5–9
38	April 20	#20 Coastal Carolina	Conway, SC	W 3–2	19–18	6–9
39	April 21	Coastal Carolina	Conway, SC	L 3–7	19–19	6–10
40	April 22	Coastal Carolina	Conway, SC	L 1–3	19–20	6–11
41	April 23	Savannah State	GSU Baseball Complex	W 9–5	20–20	6–11
42	April 27	Louisiana	GSU Baseball Complex	W 6–5	21–20	7–11
43	April 28	Louisiana	GSU Baseball Complex	L 4–6	21–21	7–12
44	April 29	Louisiana	GSU Baseball Complex	L 7–9	21–22	7–13

May

#	Date	Opponent	Venue	Score	Overall Record	SBC Record
45	May 2	Savannah State	GSU Baseball Complex	W 10–2	22–22	7–13
46	May 4	Louisiana–Monroe	Monroe, LA	L 6–9	22–23	7–14
47	May 5	Louisiana–Monroe	Monroe, LA	L 2–11	22–24	7–15
48	May 6	Louisiana–Monroe	Monroe, LA	L 4–9	22–25	7–16
49	May 8	Kennesaw State	Kennesaw, GA	W 7–4	23–25	7–16
50	May 11	Appalachian State	GSU Baseball Complex	W 2–4	24–25	8–16
51	May 12	Appalachian State	GSU Baseball Complex	L 3–4	24–26	8–17
52	May 13	Appalachian State	GSU Baseball Complex	W 3–2	25–26	9–17
53	May 15	Mercer	Macon, GA	Cancelled	–	–
54	May 17	Georgia Southern	Statesboro, GA	L 5–19	25–27	9–18
55	May 18	Georgia Southern	Statesboro, GA	L 7–12	25–28	9–19
56	May 19	Georgia Southern	Statesboro, GA	W 5–4	26–28	10–19

Sun Belt Championship

#	Date	Opponent	Venue	Score	Overall Record	SBC Record
57	May 22	Little Rock	Lafayette, LA	L 1–2	26–19	(0–1)
