= 2018 Louisiana–Monroe Warhawks baseball team =

American college baseball season

2018 Louisiana–Monroe Warhawks baseball
- Conference: Sun Belt Conference
- West Division
- Record: 23–31 (10–20 SBC)
- Head coach: Michael Federico (1st season)
- Assistant coaches: Matt Collins; Grayson Crawford; Brandon Belanger
- Home stadium: Warhawk Field

2018 Sun Belt Conference baseball standings
	Conf.						Overall
Team	W		L		T	PCT	W		L		T	PCT
East Division
No. 21 Coastal Carolina ^{x}‍‍‡‍^{y}	23	–	7	–	0	.767	38	–	17	–	0	.691
Troy ‍‍‍^{y}	19	–	11	–	0	.633	38	–	18	–	0	.679
South Alabama ‍‍‍	18	–	11	–	0	.621	30	–	23	–	0	.566
Georgia Southern ‍‍‍	18	–	11	–	0	.621	29	–	24	–	0	.547
Georgia State ‍‍‍	10	–	19	–	0	.345	26	–	28	–	0	.481
Appalachian State ‍‍‍	9	–	21	–	0	.300	18	–	36	–	0	.333
West Division
Louisiana ^{x}‍‍‍	18	–	12	–	0	.600	33	–	23	–	0	.589
Texas State ‍‍‍	16	–	14	–	0	.533	28	–	26	–	1	.518
Little Rock ‍‍‍	15	–	14	–	0	.517	28	–	25	–	0	.528
Arkansas State ‍‍‍	11	–	19	–	0	.367	20	–	30	–	0	.400
UT Arlington ‍‍‍	11	–	19	–	0	.367	21	–	33	–	0	.389
Louisiana–Monroe ‍‍‍	10	–	20	–	0	.333	23	–	31	–	0	.426
x – Division champion ‡ – Tournament champion y – Invited to the NCAA tournament As of May 20, 2018; Rankings from Collegiate Baseball

The 2018 Louisiana–Monroe Warhawks baseball team represented the University of Louisiana at Monroe in the 2018 NCAA Division I baseball season. The Warhawks played their home games at Warhawk Field. They were under the direction of first year head coach Michael Federico.

== Schedule and results ==
Louisiana–Monroe announced its 2018 baseball schedule on November 15, 2017. The 2017 schedule consists of 27 home games in the regular season. The Warhawks will play 23 games against opponents who have won more than 30 games last season, including NCAA tournament participants, South Alabama and Arkansas.

The 2018 Sun Belt Conference Championship will be contested May 22–27 in Lafayette, Louisiana, and will be hosted by Louisiana–Lafayette.

2018 Louisiana–Monroe Warhawks baseball game log
Regular season (22–25)

February (6–2)
Date	Opponent	Rank	Site	Score	Attendance	Overall record	SBC record
Feb. 16	Eastern Illinois		Warhawk Field • Monroe, LA	W 4–3 (10)	874	1–0	–
Feb. 16	Eastern Illinois		Warhawk Field • Monroe, LA	W 7–6	874	2–0	–
Feb. 18	Eastern Illinois		Warhawk Field • Monroe, LA	L 5–6	869	2–1	–
Feb. 20	Northwestern State		Warhawk Field • Monroe, LA	W 11–6	1,056	3–1	–
Feb. 23	Northern Kentucky		Warhawk Field • Monroe, LA	W 13–10	925	4–1	–
Feb. 23	Northern Kentucky		Warhawk Field • Monroe, LA	W 9–5	925	5–1	–
Feb. 24	Northern Kentucky		Warhawk Field • Monroe, LA	W 21–9	947	6–1	–
Feb. 25	Northern Kentucky		Warhawk Field • Monroe, LA	Canceled		–	–
Feb. 27	at Jackson State		Braddy Field • Jackson, MS	L 1–7	74	1–7	–

March (9–10)
Date	Opponent	Rank	Site	Score	Attendance	Overall record	SBC record
Mar. 2	at Southern Illinois		Abe Martin Field • Carbondale, IL	W 5–4	376	7–2	–
Mar. 3	at Southern Illinois		Abe Martin Field • Carbondale, IL	W 13–7	647	8–2	–
Mar. 4	at Southern Illinois		Abe Martin Field • Carbondale, IL	W 7–4	563	9–2	–
Mar. 7	Louisiana Tech		Warhawk Field • Monroe, LA	L 0–7	2,091	9–3	–
Mar. 9	at Stephen F. Austin		Jaycees Field • Nacogdoches, TX	W 9–7	312	10–3	–
Mar. 10	at Stephen F. Austin		Jaycees Field • Nacogdoches, TX	L 7–10	269	10–4	–
Mar. 11	at Stephen F. Austin		Jaycees Field • Nacogdoches, TX	L 11–13	308	10–5	–
Mar. 13	at Northwestern State		H. Alvin Brown–C. C. Stroud Field • Natchitoches, LA	L 3–14	574	10–6	–
Mar. 16	at South Alabama		Eddie Stanky Field • Mobile, AL	L 3–5	1,617	10–7	0–1
Mar. 17	at South Alabama		Eddie Stanky Field • Mobile, AL	L 0–6	1,617	10–8	0–2
Mar. 18	at South Alabama		Eddie Stanky Field • Mobile, AL	W 12–6	1,429	11–8	1–2
Mar. 21	at Louisiana Tech		J. C. Love Field at Pat Patterson Park • Ruston, LA	L 1–6	1,921	11–9	–
Mar. 23	Arkansas State		Warhawk Field • Monroe, LA	W 2–0	1,152	12–9	2–2
Mar. 24	Arkansas State		Warhawk Field • Monroe, LA	L 7–31	1,369	12–10	2–3
Mar. 25	Arkansas State		Warhawk Field • Monroe, LA	W 4–0	858	13–10	3–3
Mar. 27	Jackson State		Warhawk Field • Monroe, LA	W 10–7	915	14–10	–
Mar. 29	at UT Arlington		Clay Gould Ballpark • Arlington, TX	L 2–5	338	14–11	3–4
Mar. 30	at UT Arlington		Clay Gould Ballpark • Arlington, TX	L 0–5	520	14–12	3–5
Mar. 31	at UT Arlington		Clay Gould Ballpark • Arlington, TX	W 2–0	511	15–12	4–5

April (3–13)
Date	Opponent	Rank	Site	Score	Attendance	Overall record	SBC record
April 3	at #5 Arkansas		Baum Stadium • Fayetteville, AR	L 9–10 (10)	6,682	15–13	–
April 4	at #5 Arkansas		Baum Stadium • Fayetteville, AR	L 0–4	6,963	15–14	–
April 7	Texas State		Warhawk Field • Monroe, LA	L 2–8	869	15–15	4–6
April 8	Texas State		Warhawk Field • Monroe, LA	W 3–2	971	16–15	5–6
April 8	Texas State		Warhawk Field • Monroe, LA	W 1–0	971	17–15	6–6
April 14	at Liitle Rock		Gary Hogan Field • Little Rock, AR	L 4–7	98	17–16	6–7
April 14	at Little Rock		Gary Hogan Field • Little Rock, AR	L 2–3	127	17–17	6–8
April 15	at Little Rock		Gary Hogan Field • Little Rock, AR	L 5–6	138	17–18	6–9
April 17	at Grambling State		Wilbert Ellis Field • Grambling, LA	L 7–9	173	17–19	–
April 20	Appalachian State		Warhawk Field • Monroe, LA	L 1–4	834	17–20	6–10
April 21	Appalachian State		Warhawk Field • Monroe, LA	W 5–0	816	18–20	7–10
April 21	Appalachian State		Warhawk Field • Monroe, LA	L 1–4	816	18–21	7–11
April 24	McNeese State		Warhawk Field • Monroe, LA	L 3–7 (11)	1,441	18–22	–
April 27	at #16 Coastal Carolina		Springs Brooks Stadium • Conway, SC	L 4–14	1,318	18–23	7-12
April 28	at #16 Coastal Carolina		Springs Brooks Stadium • Conway, SC	L 4–11	1,246	18–24	7–13
April 29	at #16 Coastal Carolina		Springs Brooks Stadium • Conway, SC	L 16–17	1,239	18–25	7–14

May (4–0)
Date	Opponent	Rank	Site	Score	Attendance	Overall record	SBC record
May 1	Grambling State		Warhawk Field • Monroe, LA	W 16–2	1,293	19–25	–
May 5	Georgia State		Warhawk Field • Monroe, LA	W 9–6	995	20–25	8–14
May 5	Georgia State		Warhawk Field • Monroe, LA	W 11–2	995	21–25	9–14
May 6	Georgia State		Warhawk Field • Monroe, LA	W 9–4	969	22–25	10–14
May 11	Troy		Warhawk Field • Monroe, LA	L 1–8	933	22–26	10–15
May 12	Troy		Warhawk Field • Monroe, LA	L 2–7	831	22–27	10–16
May 13	Troy		Warhawk Field • Monroe, LA	L 2–4	934	22–28	10–17
May 15	at McNeese State		Joe Miller Ballpark • Lake Charles, LA	W 10–7	693	23–28	–
May 17	at Louisiana–Lafayette		M.L. Tigue Moore Field • Lafayette, LA	L 3–4	4,617	23–29	10–18
May 18	at Louisiana–Lafayette		M.L. Tigue Moore Field • Lafayette, LA	L 6–9	5,244	23–30	10–19
May 19	at Louisiana–Lafayette		M.L. Tigue Moore Field • Lafayette, LA	L 2–7	4,720	23–31	10–20

- Rankings are based on the team's current ranking in the Collegiate Baseball poll.
