= 2018 ASUN Conference baseball tournament =

American college baseball tournament

- Teams: 6
- Format: Double-elimination
- Finals site: Harmon Stadium; Jacksonville, Florida
- Champions: Stetson (8th title)
- Winning coach: Steve Trimper (1st title)
- MVP: Eric Foggo (Stetson)
- Television: ESPN+

2018 ASUN Conference baseball standings
	Conf.						Overall
Team	W		L		T	PCT	W		L		T	PCT
No. 10 Stetson ‍†‍‡‍^{y}	15	–	3	–	0	.833	48	–	13	–	0	.787
Jacksonville ‍‍‍^{y}	14	–	6	–	0	.700	40	–	21	–	0	.656
Kennesaw State ‍‍‍	11	–	10	–	0	.524	25	–	30	–	0	.455
North Florida ‍‍‍	10	–	11	–	0	.476	28	–	28	–	0	.500
Lipscomb ‍‍‍	9	–	12	–	0	.429	24	–	30	–	0	.444
NJIT ‍‍‍	9	–	12	–	0	.429	22	–	25	–	0	.468
Florida Gulf Coast ‍‍‍	8	–	13	–	0	.381	32	–	21	–	0	.604
USC Upstate ‍‍‍	5	–	14	–	0	.263	23	–	28	–	1	.452
† – Conference champion ‡ – Tournament champion y – Invited to the NCAA tournament As of June 30, 2018; Rankings from Collegiate Baseball

The 2018 ASUN Conference baseball tournament was held at Harmon Stadium on the campus of the University of North Florida in Jacksonville, Florida, from May 23 through 26. As the winner of the tournament for the league-best eighth time, Stetson claimed the ASUN Conference's automatic bid to the 2018 NCAA Division I baseball tournament.

== Format and seeding ==
The 2018 tournament was a double-elimination tournament in which the top six conference members participated. Seeds were determined based on conference winning percentage from the round-robin regular season.

Team	W	L	Pct	GB	Seed
Stetson	15	3	.833	—	1
Jacksonville	14	6	.700	2	2
Kennesaw State	11	10	.524	5.5	3
North Florida	10	11	.476	6.5	4
Lipscomb	9	12	.429	7.5	5
NJIT	9	12	.429	7.5	6
Florida Gulf Coast	8	13	.381	8.5	—
USC Spartans	5	14	.263	10.5	—

== Bracket and results ==
First round
1	Stetson	7
6	NJIT	2
2	Jacksonville	9
5	Lipscomb	6
3	Kennesaw State	1
4	North Florida	7

Second round
1	Stetson	2
3	Kennesaw State	1
2	Jacksonville	4
4	North Florida	3
6	NJIT	5
5	Lipscomb	10

Third round
1	Stetson	9
2	Jacksonville	8
4	North Florida	7
5	Lipscomb	6

Semifinals
2	Jacksonville	2
4	North Florida	6

Final
1	Stetson	6	—
4	North Florida	0	—

== All-Tournament Team ==
The following players were named to the All-Tournament Team.

Name	School
Angel Camacho	Jacksonville
Jeffrey Crisan	Lipscomb
Scott Dubrule	Jacksonville
Eric Foggo	Stetson
Frank German	North Florida
Logan Gilbert	Stetson
Jacob Koos	Stetson
Mitchell Senger	Stetson
Mike Spooner	Stetson
Ruben Someillan	Jacksonville
Blake Voyles	North Florida

=== Most Valuable Player ===
Eric Foggo was named Tournament Most Valuable Player. Foggo was a freshman first baseman for Stetson, who batted 6 for 14 for the Tournament with 4 RBI.
