= John Valente =

Italian-American baseball player (born 1995)

St. John's Red Storm
- Infielder / Coach
- Born: June 23, 1995 (age 31); New Rochelle, New York, U.S.
- Bats: Switch Throws: Right

John Valente (born June 23, 1995) is an American former professional baseball infielder. He is an assistant coach for the St. John's Red Storm baseball team.

== Playing career ==
Valente attended New Rochelle High School in New Rochelle, New York, and St. John's University, where he played college baseball for the St. John's Red Storm. During the 2018 season, Valente was named the Big East Conference's Player of the Year, the first St. John's player to receive the award. He led the league with a .363 batting average, and recorded a career high five home runs, 40 RBIs and 11 stolen bases, while striking out only nine times in 204 at-bats. He was also named a unanimous first-team All-Big East selection and a finalist for the Senior CLASS Award. On May 10, 2018, he recorded his 200th career hit, becoming the 23rd player in program history to reach the milestone. He helped lead the Red Storm to four winning seasons, three 40-win seasons, and a pair of Big East Championships. He finished his career at St. John's with a career batting average of .353, and 218 hits, which ranks 13th most in program history.

The Detroit Tigers selected Valente in the 21st round, with the 615th overall selection, of the 2018 Major League Baseball draft. During the 2021 season in 66 games with the Erie SeaWolves, Valente ranked among the team leaders with a .301 batting average, .363 on-base percentage and .808 on-base plus slugging (OPS) with 69 hits and 22 RBI. On April 4, 2022, he was promoted to the Tigers' Triple-A affiliate, the Toledo Mud Hens. During the 2022 season in 82 games with the Mud Hens, he posted career highs with 37 runs scored, 26 RBIs and 14 stolen bases, along with a .293/.355/.390 slash line. On July 28, 2023, Valente retired from baseball.

== Coaching career ==
On August 31, 2023, Valente was named an assistant coach for St. John's University, where he will serve as hitting coach.

== International career ==
Valente is a member of Italy national baseball team's roster at the 2023 World Baseball Classic.
