= 2018 Louisiana Ragin' Cajuns baseball team =

American college baseball season

2018 Louisiana Ragin' Cajuns baseball

Sun Belt Conference West Division Champion
- Conference: Sun Belt Conference
- West Division
- Record: 34-25 (18-12 SBC)
- Head coach: Tony Robichaux (24th season)
- Assistant coaches: Anthony Babineaux; Jeremy Talbot
- Home stadium: M. L. Tigue Moore Field at Russo Park

2018 Sun Belt Conference baseball standings
	Conf.						Overall
Team	W		L		T	PCT	W		L		T	PCT
East Division
No. 21 Coastal Carolina ^{x}‍‍‡‍^{y}	23	–	7	–	0	.767	38	–	17	–	0	.691
Troy ‍‍‍^{y}	19	–	11	–	0	.633	38	–	18	–	0	.679
South Alabama ‍‍‍	18	–	11	–	0	.621	30	–	23	–	0	.566
Georgia Southern ‍‍‍	18	–	11	–	0	.621	29	–	24	–	0	.547
Georgia State ‍‍‍	10	–	19	–	0	.345	26	–	28	–	0	.481
Appalachian State ‍‍‍	9	–	21	–	0	.300	18	–	36	–	0	.333
West Division
Louisiana ^{x}‍‍‍	18	–	12	–	0	.600	33	–	23	–	0	.589
Texas State ‍‍‍	16	–	14	–	0	.533	28	–	26	–	1	.518
Little Rock ‍‍‍	15	–	14	–	0	.517	28	–	25	–	0	.528
Arkansas State ‍‍‍	11	–	19	–	0	.367	20	–	30	–	0	.400
UT Arlington ‍‍‍	11	–	19	–	0	.367	21	–	33	–	0	.389
Louisiana–Monroe ‍‍‍	10	–	20	–	0	.333	23	–	31	–	0	.426
x – Division champion ‡ – Tournament champion y – Invited to the NCAA tournament As of May 20, 2018; Rankings from Collegiate Baseball

The 2018 Louisiana Ragin' Cajuns baseball team represented the University of Louisiana at Lafayette in the 2018 NCAA Division I baseball season. The Ragin' Cajuns play their home games at M. L. Tigue Moore Field at Russo Park and were led by twenty-fourth year head coach Tony Robichaux.

== Preseason ==
=== Sun Belt Conference Coaches Poll ===
The Sun Belt Conference Coaches Poll was released on January 30, 2018. Louisiana was picked to finish first in the West Division with 68 votes and 9 first-place votes.

Coaches poll (West)
Predicted finish	Team	Votes (1st place)
1	Louisiana	68 (9)
2	UT Arlington	56 (2)
3	Texas State	51 (1)
4	Arkansas State	36
5	Little Rock	27
6	Louisiana-Monroe	11

=== Preseason All-Sun Belt team ===
- Andrew Crane (TROY, SR, Pitcher)
- Trae Patterson (UTA, SR, Pitcher)
- Seth Shuman (GASO, SO, Pitcher)
- Dylan Moore (LA, SR, Pitcher)
- Will Olson (UTA, JR, Catcher)
- Wells Davis (USA, JR, 1st Base)
- Jonathan Ortega (TXST, JR, 2nd Base)
- Drew LaBounty (USA, SR, Shortstop)
- Jaylen Hubbard (TXST, JR, 3rd Base)
- Brendan Donovan (USA, JR, Outfield)
- Brandon Lockridge (TROY, JR, Outfield)
- Travis Swaggerty (USA, JR, Outfield)
- Omar Salinas (UTA, SR, Designated Hitter)
- Dylan Paul (TXST, SR, Utility)

== Roster ==
2018 Louisiana Ragin' Cajuns roster
Pitchers: 2 Colton Schmidt - Senior; 6 Nick Lee - Junior; 17 Gunner Leger - Senior; 20 Brock Batty - Freshman; 24 Caleb Armstrong - Sophomore; 27 Austin Perrin - Freshman; 28 Logan Savoy - Freshman; 30 Hogan Harris - Junior; 31 Brett Williams - Freshman; 32 Logan Stoelke - Senior; 34 Grant Cox - Junior; 39 Michael Leaumont - Freshman; 40 Dylan Moore - Senior; 42 Haden Erbe - Sophomore; 43 Jacob Norman - Sophomore; 45 Jack Burk - Sophomore; 47 Jimmy Dobrash - Junior; 48 Dalton Horton - Sophomore; 50 Emile Lege - Sophomore; Catchers: 11 Kole McKinnon - Junior; 23 Handsome Monica - Senior; 35 Brady Jones - Freshman; 44 Nick Hanks - Freshman; 46 Blake Faecher - Freshman	Infielders: 1 Connor Dupuy - Freshman; 5 Hayden Cantrelle - Freshman; 7 O'Neal Lochridge - RS Freshman; 12 Jonathan Windham - Freshman; 13 Monroe Moll - RS Freshman; 14 Kennon Fontenot - Senior; 15 Tyler Stover - Senior; 19 Hunter Kasuls - Junior; 29 Luke Coker - Freshman; 49 Christian Cusimano - Freshman; Outfielders: 3 Brennan Breaux - Junior; 8 Zach Lafleur - Senior; 9 Todd Lott - Sophomore; 10 Alex Hannie - Freshman; 18 Tremaine Spears - Sophomore; 22 Marco Ramos - Senior; 26 Daniel Lahare - Junior; 33 Jamarius Williams - Senior; 38 Jansen Fontenot - Freshman; 41 Gavin Bourgeois - Junior

=== Coaching staff ===
2018 Louisiana Ragin' Cajuns coaching staff
- Tony Robichaux – Head Coach – 24th year
- Anthony Babineaux – Associate head coach – 24th year
- Jeremy Talbot – Assistant Head Coach – 4th year
- Daniel Freeman – Volunteer Assistant Coach – 4th year
- Chris Domingue – Director of Baseball Operations – 15th year
- Debbie Guilbeaux – Administrative Assistant
- Jacob Raggio – Clubhouse Manager
- Colin Burgess – Clubhouse Manager
- Kaleb Istre – Field Manager
- Victoria Stringer – Student Assistant

== Schedule and results ==
Legend
	Louisiana win
	Louisiana loss
	Postponement
**Bold**	Louisiana team member

2018 Louisiana Ragin' Cajuns baseball game log
Regular season (33-23)

February (3-5)
Date	Opponent	Rank	Site/stadium	Score	Win	Loss	Save	TV	Attendance	Overall record	SBC record
Feb. 16	at No. 14 Texas		UFCU Disch-Falk Field • Austin, TX	**L** 0-3	Kingham (1-0)	**Burk** (0-1)	Ridgeway (1)	Longhorn Network	5,195	0-1	
Feb. 17	at No. 14 Texas		UFCU Disch-Falk Field • Austin, TX	**L** 3-5	Ridgeway (1-0)	**Moore** (0-1)	None	Longhorn Network	5,330	0-2	
Feb. 18	at No. 14 Texas		UFCU Disch-Falk Field • Austin, TX	**W** 2-1	**Batty** (1–0)	McGuire (0-1)	**Stoelke** (1)	Longhorn Network	5,119	1-2	
Feb. 21	at Southeastern Louisiana	No. 20	Pat Kenelly Diamond at Alumni Field • Hammond, LA	**L** 2-5	Koestler (1-0)	**Perrin** (0-1)	None	None	1,657	1-3	
Feb. 23	Wright State	No. 20	M. L. Tigue Moore Field at Russo Park • Lafayette, LA	**L** 2-8	Weiss (1-0)	**Burk** (0-2)	None	CST	5,196	1-4	
Feb. 24	Wright State	No. 20	M. L. Tigue Moore Field at Russo Park • Lafayette, LA	**W** 6-3	**Batty** (2-0)	Gremling (0-2)	**Stoelke** (2)	Ragin' Cajuns Digital Network	5,044	2-4	
Feb. 25	Wright State	No. 20	M. L. Tigue Moore Field at Russo Park • Lafayette, LA	**L** 3-4	Sampen (1-0)	**Perrin** (0-2)	Hendrixson (1)	Ragin' Cajun Digital Network	4,707	2–5	
Feb. 28	Nicholls		M. L. Tigue Moore Field at Russo Park • Lafayette, LA	**W** 2-1	**Schmidt** (1-0)	Bedevian (0-2)	**Stoelke** (3)	Ragin' Cajuns Digital Network	4,914	3–5	

March (9-10)
Date	Opponent	Rank	Site/stadium	Score	Win	Loss	Save	TV	Attendance	Overall record	SBC record
Shriner's College Classic
Mar. 2	vs. No. 21 Mississippi State		Minute Maid Park • Houston, TX	**L** 1-3	Gordon (0-1)	**Batty** (2-1)	None	AT&T SportsNet Southwest	4,972	3–6	
Mar. 3	vs. No. 12 Vanderbilt		Minute Maid Park • Houston, TX	**W** 3-0	**Burk** (1-2)	Raby (0-2)	**Stoelke** (4)	AT&T SportsNet Southwest		4–6	
Mar. 4	vs. No. 7 Kentucky		Minute Maid Park • Houston, TX	**L** 4-10	Lewis (3-0)	**Perrin** (0-3)	None	AT&T SportsNet Southwest		4–7	
Mar. 7	No. 13 LSU		M. L. Tigue Moore Field at Russo Park • Lafayette, LA	**W** 4-3 (10 inn)	**Stoelke** (1-1)	Bain (1-1)	None	CST	5,499	5–7	
Mar. 9	South Alabama		M. L. Tigue Moore Field at Russo Park • Lafayette, LA	**W** 2-1	**Lee** (1-0)	Carr (1-2)	**Batty** (1)	CST	4,822	6–7	
Mar. 10	South Alabama		M. L. Tigue Moore Field at Russo Park • Lafayette, LA	**L** 3-7	DeSantis (2-0)	**Burk** (1-3)	None	Ragin' Cajuns Digital Network	4,793	6–8	
Mar. 11	South Alabama		M. L. Tigue Moore Field at Russo Park • Lafayette, LA	**L** 5-11	Shell (1-2)	**Perrin** (0-4)	None	Ragin' Cajuns Digital Network	4,670	6–9	
Mar. 13	at Tulane		Greer Field at Turchin Stadium • New Orleans, LA	**W** 5-2 (11 inn)	**Moore** (1-1)	White (0-1)	None	CST	2,079	7–9	
Mar. 16	at Georgia Southern		J. I. Clements Stadium • Statesboro, GA	**L** 3-6	Eichhorn (1-0)	**Lee** (1-1)	Cohen (3)	ESPN3	717	7–10	0-1
Mar. 17	at Georgia Southern		J. I. Clements Stadium • Statesboro, GA	**W** 11-2	**Burk** (2-3)	Shuman (2-2)	None	None	608	8–10	1-1
Mar. 18	at Georgia Southern		J. I. Clements Stadium • Statesboro, GA	**L** 4-5	Whitney (1-1)	**Harris** (0-1)	Cohen (4)	None	423	7-11	1-2
Mar. 21	at McNeese State		Joe Miller Ballpark • Lake Charles, LA	**W** 5-2	**Perrin** (1-4)	Goree (0-2)	**Stoelke** (5)	None	1,952	9–11	
Mar. 23	Troy		M. L. Tigue Moore Field at Russo Park • Lafayette, LA	**L** 2-6	Crane (3-2)	**Lee** (1-2)	None	Ragin' Cajuns Digital Network	4,832	9–12	1–3
Mar. 24	Troy		M. L. Tigue Moore Field at Russo Park • Lafayette, LA	**L** 5-8	Osby (3-0)	**Burk** (2-4)	Carter (4)	Ragin' Cajuns Digital Network	4,818	9–13	1-4
Mar. 25	Troy		M. L. Tigue Moore Field at Russo Park • Lafayette, LA	**W** 4-3	**Stoelke** (2-0)	Carter (3-2)	None	Ragin' Cajuns Digital Network	4,473	10–13	2-4
Wally Pontiff Classic
Mar. 27	vs. No. 19 LSU		Shrine on Airline • Metairie, LA	**W** 3-1	**Harris** (1-1)	Labas (2-1)	**Stoelke** (6)	CST	8,732	11–13	
Mar. 29	at Arkansas State		Tomlinson Stadium-Kell Field • Jonesboro, AR	**L** 7-8 (12 inn)	Ritter (1-0)	**Cox** (0-1)	None	None	239	11–14	2–5
Mar. 30	at Arkansas State		Tomlinson Stadium-Kell Field • Jonesboro, AR	**L** 2-14	Alberius (4-1)	**Lee** (1-3)	None	None	347	11–15	2–6
Mar. 31	at Arkansas State		Tomlinson Stadium-Kell Field • Jonesboro, AR	**W** 6-1	**Schmidt** (2-0)	Culbertson (1-3)	None	None	408	12–15	3-6

April (14-5)
Date	Opponent	Rank	Site/stadium	Score	Win	Loss	Save	TV	Attendance	Overall record	SBC record
April 3	at No. 12 Southern Miss		Pete Taylor Park • Hattiesburg, MS	**L** 8-9	Driver (2-0)	**Moore** (1-2)	None	None	3,449	12–16	
April 4	at No. 12 Southern Miss		Pete Taylor Park • Hattiesburg, MS	**W** 7-4	**Williams** (1-0)	Carroll (0-2)	**Stoelke** (7)	None	3,619	13–16	
April 6	UT Arlington		M. L. Tigue Moore Field at Russo Park • Lafayette, LA	**W** 2-0	**Schmidt** (3-0)	Vassar (2-3)	**Stoelke** (8)	Ragin' Cajuns Digital Network	4,713	14–16	4–6
April 7	UT Arlington		M. L. Tigue Moore Field at Russo Park • Lafayette, LA	**W** 4-2	**Perrin** (2-4)	Moffat (3-5)	None	Ragin' Cajuns Digital Network	4,671	15–16	5–6
April 8	UT Arlington		M. L. Tigue Moore Field at Russo Park • Lafayette, LA	**L** 2-4 (10 inn)	James (1-3)	**Moore** (1-3)	None	Ragin' Cajuns Digital Network	4,641	15–17	5-7
April 10	McNeese State		M. L. Tigue Moore Field at Russo Park • Lafayette, LA	**W** 12-10	**Cox** (1-1)	Briggs (0-2)	**Leaumont** (1)	CST	4,761	16–17	
April 11	Southeastern Louisiana		M. L. Tigue Moore Field at Russo Park • Lafayette, LA	**W** 4-3 (11 inn)	**Leaumont** (1-0)	Biddy (2-1)	None	CST	4,761	17–17	
April 13	at Appalachian State		Beaver Field at Jim and Bettie Smith Stadium • Boone, NC	**W** 4-3	**Schmidt** (4-0)	Schmid (2-4)	**Lee** (1)	ESPN3	484	18–17	
April 14	at Appalachian State		Beaver Field at Jim and Bettie Smith Stadium • Boone, NC	**W** 5-4	**Burk** (3-4)	Vaccacio (1-8)	**Lee** (2)	None	291	19–17	
April 14	at Appalachian State		Beaver Field at Jim and Bettie Smith Stadium • Boone, NC	**W** 6-2	**Harris** (2-1)	Howell (0-4)	None	None		20–17	
April 18	Louisiana Tech		M. L. Tigue Moore Field at Russo Park • Lafayette, LA	**L** 2-15	Leal (3-2)	**Perrin** (2-5)	None	Ragin' Cajuns Digital Network	4,777	20–18	
April 20	vs. Little Rock		M. L. Tigue Moore Field at Russo Park • Lafayette, LA	**W** 1-0	**Schmidt** (5-0)	Fidel (5-3)	**Lee** (3)	Ragin' Cajuns Digital Network	4,794	21–18	9–7
April 21	Little Rock		M. L. Tigue Moore Field at Russo Park • Lafayette, LA	**W** 4-0	**Harris** (3-1)	Ortiz (2-2)	**Leaumont** (2)	Ragin' Cajuns Digital Network	4,896	22–18	10–7
April 22	Little Rock		M. L. Tigue Moore Field at Russo Park • Lafayette, LA	**L** 7-9 (11 inn)	Garcia (3-2)	**Lee** (1-4	None	Ragin' Cajuns Digital Network	4,679	22-19	10-8
April 24	at Louisiana Tech		J. C. Love Field at Pat Patterson Park • Ruston, LA	**W** 9-4	**Perrin** (3-5)	Leal (3-3)	None	None	2,138	23–19	
April 25	New Orleans		M. L. Tigue Moore Field at Russo Park • Lafayette, LA	**W** 8-6	**Moore** (2-3)	Oset (2-3)	None	Ragin' Cajuns Digital Network	4,633	24–19	
April 27	at Georgia State		Georgia State Baseball Complex • Atlanta, GA	**L** 5-6 (12 inn)	Koch (1-2)	**Lee** (1-5)	None	None	381	24–20	10–9
April 28	at Georgia State		Georgia State Baseball Complex • Atlanta, GA	**W** 6-4 (11 inn)	**Stoelke** (3-0)	Baker (2-3)	None	None	405	25–20	11–9
April 29	at Georgia State		Georgia State Baseball Complex • Atlanta, GA	**W** 9-7	**Moore** (3-3)	Horton (0-1)	None	None	365	26–20	12–9

May (7–3)
Date	Opponent	Rank	Site/stadium	Score	Win	Loss	Save	TV	Attendance	Overall record	SEC record
May 4	No. 15 Coastal Carolina		M. L. Tigue Moore Field at Russo Park • Lafayette, LA	**W** 12-6	**Schmidt** (6-0)	Hopeck (4-4)	None	CST	5,008	27–20	13-9
May 5	No. 15 Coastal Carolina		M. L. Tigue Moore Field at Russo Park • Lafayette, LA	**W** 5-1	**Harris** (4-1)	Bilous (6-2)	None	Ragin' Cajuns Digital Network	5,121	28–20	14–9
May 6	No. 15 Coastal Carolina		M. L. Tigue Moore Field at Russo Park • Lafayette, LA	**L** 3-10	Eardensohn (5-0)	**Burk** (3-5)	None	Ragin' Cajuns Digital Network	4,768	28–21	14–10
May 11	at Texas State		Bobcat Ballpark • San Marcos, TX	**W** 7-4	**Schmidt** (7-0)	Fraze (5-4)	**Stoelke** (9)	None	1,302	29–21	15–10
May 12	at Texas State		Bobcat Ballpark • San Marcos, TX	**L** 5-6	Pagano (2-0)	**Lee** (1-6)	None	None	1,292	29–22	15–11
May 13	at Texas State		Bobcat Ballpark • San Marcos, TX	**L** 6-8	Leigh (2-3)	**Burk** (3-6)	Sherley (1)	None	1,188	29–23	15–12
May 15	Tulane		M. L. Tigue Moore Field at Russo Park • Lafayette, LA	**W** 7-6	**Lee** (2-6)	Gillies (5-6)	None	CST	4,743	30–23	
May 17	Louisiana-Monroe		M. L. Tigue Moore Field at Russo Park • Lafayette, LA	**W** 4-3 (10 inn)	**Moore** (4-3)	Curtis (3-2)	None	Ragin' Cajuns Digital Network	4,671	31–23	16–12
May 18	Louisiana-Monroe		M. L. Tigue Moore Field at Russo Park • Lafayette, LA	**W** 9-6	**Harris** (5-1)	Beal (3-8)	**Stoelke** (10)	Ragin' Cajuns Digital Network	5,244	32–23	17–12
May 19	Louisiana-Monroe		M. L. Tigue Moore Field at Russo Park • Lafayette, LA	**W** 7-2	**Lee** (3-6)	Olaughlin (2-3)	None	Ragin' Cajuns Digital Network	4,720	33–23	18–12

Postseason (1-2)

SBC Tournament (1-2)
Date	Opponent	Seed/Rank	Site/stadium	Score	Win	Loss	Save	TV	Attendance	Overall record	SBC record
May 23	Little Rock		M. L. Tigue Moore Field at Russo Park • Lafayette, LA	**W** 19-16	**Stoelke** (4-0)	Garcia (4-5)	None	ESPN+	4,039	34–23	
May 24	Troy		M. L. Tigue Moore Field at Russo Park • Lafayette, LA	**L** 1-10	Crane (7-4)	**Harris** (5-2)	None	ESPN+	3,222	34–24	
May 25	Texas State		M. L. Tigue Moore Field at Russo Park • Lafayette, LA	**L** 1-11	Leigh (4-3)	**Lee** (3-7)	None	ESPN+	3,249	34–25	

Schedule source:

*Rankings are based on the team's current ranking in the D1Baseball poll.
