= Greg Frady =

American college baseball coach

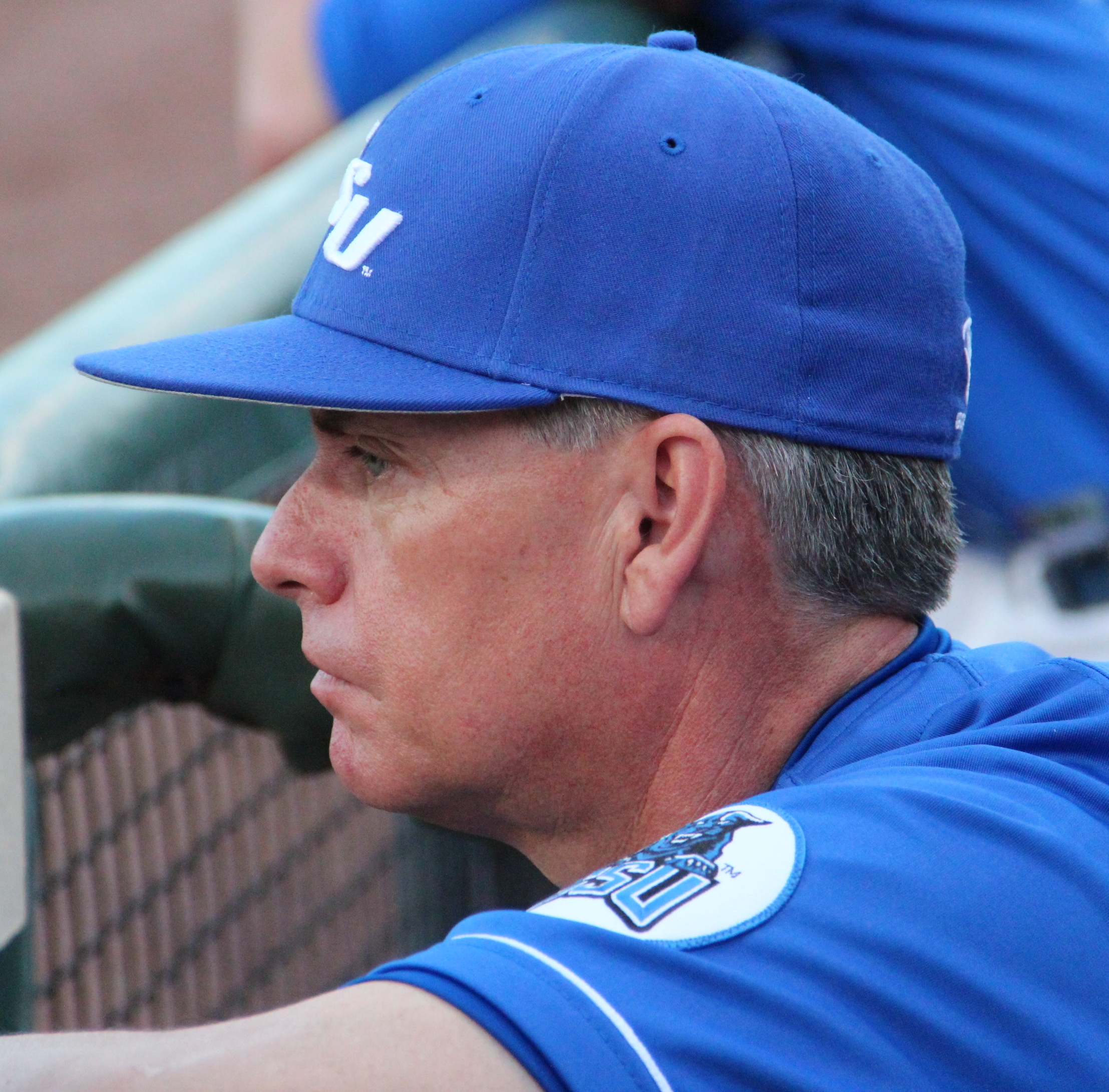
- Frady in 2014

Biographical details
- Born: December 2, 1962 (age 63); Ellijay, Georgia, U.S.
- Education: Troy University

Playing career
- 1984–1987: Troy Trojans

Coaching career (HC unless noted)
- 1988-1989: Columbus State(grad. asst.)
- 1990–1996: North Florida Community College
- 1997–2003: Central Florida (asst.)
- 2005-2006: Georgia State(asst.)
- 2007-2019: Georgia State

Head coaching record
- Overall: 503–419–1 (.546)
- Tournaments: Sun Belt: 1–3; NCAA: 0–2

Accomplishments and honors

Championships
- 4 Colonial Athletic Association Tournament championship appearances (2007, 2009, 2010, 2011); 1 Colonial Athletic Association Tournament championship (2009); 1 NCAA Regional appearances (2009)

Greg Frady (born December 2, 1962) is an American college baseball coach. He was most recently the head coach of the Georgia State Panthers baseball team since the start of the 2007 season until the end of the 2019 season. He also served as general manager of the German National team. Frady was the head coach at North Florida Community College from 1990–1996. Before serving as North Florida Community College head coach, Frady played for Troy from 1984–1987. He began his coaching career as a graduate assistant at Columbus State University. From 1997–2003, he served as an assistant at Central Florida before being hired as an assistant coach at Georgia State in 2004. He became general manager for the German national team in 2004 and head coach at Georgia State in 2007. In July, 2020, he was named the first Head Coach of the Nanaimo NightOwls of the West Coast League, signed to a five-year contract to lead the team at historic Serauxmen Stadium. The 2021 season, to be the debut of the NightOwls with Frady at the helm, was cancelled due to the pandemic.

== German national team ==
Since becoming manager for the German national baseball team, the team has gone from having to qualify to enter tournaments to being ranked 17th in the world rankings. While coaching in Germany, Frady has recruited players from the nation to play for the Georgia State Panthers team. Frady was hired by the team in 2004, leading them through the 2004 European Championships.

== Coaching career ==
=== North Florida Community College ===
After completing his graduate program at Columbus State University, Frady was hired by North Florida Community College to serve as head coach where he racked up a record of 187-112. During his time at NFCC, he served as Rotary Club president in Madison, Florida.

=== Georgia State ===
Frady began his career at Georgia State in 2004, working as an associate coach under former head coach Mike Hurst. After Hurst's retirement, Frady was promoted to head coach where he racked up a record of 228-173-1 over his first 7 years. This represents the second most wins in Georgia State History, shadowed only by Mike Hurst's 293 wins. During his tenure, the Panthers won their first conference tournament championship, taking them to the NCAA regional tournament for the first time ever. The 39 wins made that season also represented the record for most wins in a season. During the 2010 season, his Panthers led the nation in runs per game, and during the 2011 season, the Panthers made a school-record ERA.

== Head coaching record ==
Below is a table of Frady's yearly records as an NCAA head baseball coach.

Record table
Season	Team	Overall	Conference	Standing	Postseason
North Florida Community College (Records Not Available) (1990–1996)
North Florida CC:		133–54	0–0		
Georgia State Panthers (Colonial Athletic Association) (2007–2013)
2007	Georgia State	26–32	15–15	6th	CAA Tournament
2008	Georgia State	33–23	12–17	7th	
2009	Georgia State	39–22	12–9	2nd	NCAA Regional
2010	Georgia State	34–23–1	17–6–1	2nd	CAA Tournament
2011	Georgia State	37–21	17–13	4th	CAA Tournament
2012	Georgia State	24–31	14–16	7th	
2013	Georgia State	35–21	14–13	5th	
Georgia State Panthers (Sun Belt Conference) (2014–2019)
2014	Georgia State	25–31	11–19	T-8th	
2015	Georgia State	30–27	15–13	5th	Sun Belt tournament
2016	Georgia State	24–31	10–20	T-9th	
2017	Georgia State	22–33	10–20	5th (East)	Sun Belt tournament
2018	Georgia State	26–29	10–19	5th (East)	Sun Belt tournament
2019	Georgia State	15–41	6–24	6th (East)	
Georgia State:		370–365–1	163–204–1		
Total:		503–419–1			
National champion Postseason invitational champion Conference regular season champion Conference regular season and conference tournament champion Division regular season champion Division regular season and conference tournament champion Conference tournament champion
