= 2018 Coastal Carolina Chanticleers baseball team =

American college baseball season

2018 Coastal Carolina Chanticleers baseball

Sun Belt Tournament champions Sun Belt Regular season Champions Sun Belt East Division Champion
- Conference: Sun Belt Conference
- East Division
- CB: No. 28
- Record: 43–19 (23–7 SBC)
- Head coach: Gary Gilmore (23rd season)
- Assistant coaches: Kevin Schnall (15th season); Drew Thomas (12th season); Matt Schilling (11th season)
- Home stadium: Springs Brooks Stadium

2018 Sun Belt Conference baseball standings
	Conf.						Overall
Team	W		L		T	PCT	W		L		T	PCT
East Division
No. 21 Coastal Carolina ^{x}‍‍‡‍^{y}	23	–	7	–	0	.767	38	–	17	–	0	.691
Troy ‍‍‍^{y}	19	–	11	–	0	.633	38	–	18	–	0	.679
South Alabama ‍‍‍	18	–	11	–	0	.621	30	–	23	–	0	.566
Georgia Southern ‍‍‍	18	–	11	–	0	.621	29	–	24	–	0	.547
Georgia State ‍‍‍	10	–	19	–	0	.345	26	–	28	–	0	.481
Appalachian State ‍‍‍	9	–	21	–	0	.300	18	–	36	–	0	.333
West Division
Louisiana ^{x}‍‍‍	18	–	12	–	0	.600	33	–	23	–	0	.589
Texas State ‍‍‍	16	–	14	–	0	.533	28	–	26	–	1	.518
Little Rock ‍‍‍	15	–	14	–	0	.517	28	–	25	–	0	.528
Arkansas State ‍‍‍	11	–	19	–	0	.367	20	–	30	–	0	.400
UT Arlington ‍‍‍	11	–	19	–	0	.367	21	–	33	–	0	.389
Louisiana–Monroe ‍‍‍	10	–	20	–	0	.333	23	–	31	–	0	.426
x – Division champion ‡ – Tournament champion y – Invited to the NCAA tournament As of May 20, 2018; Rankings from Collegiate Baseball

The 2018 Coastal Carolina Chanticleers baseball team represented the Coastal Carolina University in the 2018 NCAA Division I baseball season. The Chanticleers played their home games at Springs Brooks Stadium.

== Schedule and results ==
The 2018 schedule consists of 35 home and 21 away games in the regular season. The Chanticleers will host Virginia Tech, Oklahoma, Kansas State, Indiana, VCU, UNCW, West Virginia, UNC, and Clemson for out of conference games. They will also host conference opponents Texas State, South Alabama, Georgia State, ULM, and UA-Little Rock.

2018 Coastal Carolina Chanticleers baseball game log
Regular season (38–17)

February (8–2)
Date	Opponent	Rank	Site	Score	Attendance	Overall record	SBC record
Feb. 16	Virginia Tech		Springs Brooks Stadium • Conway, SC	W 17–2	3,154	1–0	–
Feb. 17	Oklahoma	#18	Springs Brooks Stadium • Conway, SC	W 4–3 (10)	1,889	2–0	–
Feb. 18	Kansas State		Springs Brooks Stadium • Conway, SC	W 4–3 (10)	1,504	3-0	–
Feb. 19	Indiana	#17	Springs Brooks Stadium • Conway, SC	L 5–6	1,318	3–1	–
Feb 21	at College of Charleston		Patriot's Point • Mount Pleasant, SC	W 13-0	640	4-1	–
Feb. 23	Illinois		Springs Brooks Stadium • Conway, SC	W 6-4	1,378	5-1	–
Feb 24	Illinois		Springs Brooks Stadium • Conway, SC	L 6–7	1,672	5-2	–
Feb. 25	West Virginia		Springs Brooks Stadium • Conway, SC	W 5-2	2,039	6-2	–
Feb. 26	VCU		Springs Brooks Stadium • Conway, SC	W 15-5	1,066	7-2	–
Feb. 27	UNC Wilmington		Springs Brooks Stadium • Conway, SC	W 10-5	1,227	8-2	–

March (13–7)
Date	Opponent	Rank	Site	Score	Attendance	Overall record	SBC record
Mar. 2	Ball State		Springs Brooks Stadium • Conway, SC	W 6–3	1,153	9–2	–
Mar. 3	Maryland		Springs Brooks Stadium • Conway, SC	L 7–6	1,408	9–3	–
Mar. 4	Radford		Springs Brooks Stadium • Conway, SC	W 13–7	1,232	10-3	–
Mar. 7	Wake Forest		Springs Brooks Stadium • Conway, SC	W 19–3	1,260	11-3	–
Mar. 9	High Point		Springs Brooks Stadium • Conway, SC	L 8–5	1,133	11-4	–
Mar. 10	Ohio State		Springs Brooks Stadium • Conway, SC	W 10–8	1,753	12-4	–
Mar. 11	Ohio State		Springs Brooks Stadium • Conway, SC	L 8–5	1,291	12-5	–
Mar. 11	High Point		Springs Brooks Stadium • Conway, SC	L 3–2	1,151	12-6	–
Mar. 13	UConn		Springs Brooks Stadium • Conway, SC	L 12-10	1,406	12-7	–
Mar. 16	at Arkansas State		Tomlinson Stadium–Kell Field • Jonesboro, AR	W 3–1	271	13–7	1–0
Mar. 17	at Arkansas State		Tomlinson Stadium–Kell Field • Jonesboro, AR	W 26–14	454	14–7	2–0
Mar. 18	at Arkansas State		Tomlinson Stadium–Kell Field • Jonesboro, AR	W 8-3	321	15-7	3–0
Mar. 18	Clemson	#10	Springs Brooks Stadium • Conway, SC	W 9-5	4,130	16-7	3–0
Mar. 23	Texas State	#30	Springs Brooks Stadium • Conway, SC	W 8-0	1,316	17-7	4–0
Mar. 24	Texas State	#30	Springs Brooks Stadium • Conway, SC	W 11-3	1,548	18-7	5–0
Mar. 24	Texas State	#30	Springs Brooks Stadium • Conway, SC	W 7-3	1,548	19-7	6–0
Mar. 27	at College of Charleston		Patriot's Point • Mount Pleasant, SC	L 4-11	718	19-8	6–0
Mar. 29	at Georgia Southern		J. I. Clements Stadium • Statesboro, GA	W 7-3	842	20–8	7–0
Mar. 30	at Georgia Southern		J. I. Clements Stadium • Statesboro, GA	W 15-2	808	21–8	8–0
Mar. 31	at Georgia Southern		J. I. Clements Stadium • Statesboro, GA	L 4-5	812	21–9	8–1

April (10–5)
Date	Opponent	Rank	Site	Score	Attendance	Overall record	SBC record
Apr. 3	at Clemson	#6	Doug Kingsmore Stadium • Clemson, SC	L 1–6	6,450	21-10	8–1
Apr. 6	South Alabama		Springs Brooks Stadium • Conway, SC	L 6-11	2,311	21-11	8–2
Apr. 7	South Alabama		Springs Brooks Stadium • Conway, SC	W 14-7	1,268	22-11	9–2
Apr. 8	South Alabama		Springs Brooks Stadium • Conway, SC	W 12-0 (7)	1,251	23-11	10–2
Apr. 10	at Wake Forest		Gene Hooks Field • Winston-Salem, NC	W 9–2	402	24–11	10–2
Apr. 13	at Troy		Riddle–Pace Field • Troy, AL	L 2-4	1,936	24–12	10–3
Apr. 14	at Troy		Riddle–Pace Field • Troy, AL	W 3-2	2,129	25–12	11–3
Apr. 14	at Troy		Riddle–Pace Field • Troy, AL	W 5-4	1,879	26–12	12–3
Apr. 18	at UNC Wilmington		Brooks Field • Wilmington, NC	L 2–1 (13)	1,350	26–13	12–3
Apr. 20	Georgia State		Springs Brooks Stadium • Conway, SC	L 3-2	1,266	26-14	8–3
Apr. 21	Georgia State		Springs Brooks Stadium • Conway, SC	W 7-3	1,626	27-14	9–3
Apr. 22	Georgia State		Springs Brooks Stadium • Conway, SC	W 3-1	1,327	28-14	10–3
Apr. 27	Louisiana–Monroe		Springs Brooks Stadium • Conway, SC	W 14-4	1,318	29-14	11–3
Apr. 28	Louisiana–Monroe		Springs Brooks Stadium • Conway, SC	W 11-4	1,246	30-14	12–3
Apr. 28	Louisiana–Monroe		Springs Brooks Stadium • Conway, SC	W 17-6	1,239	31-14	13–3

May (7-3)
Date	Opponent	Rank	Site	Score	Attendance	Overall record	SBC record
May 4	at Louisiana–Lafayette		M.L. Tigue Moore Field • Lafayette, LA	L 6-12	5,008	31-15	17–4
May 5	at Louisiana–Lafayette		M.L. Tigue Moore Field • Lafayette, LA	L 1-5	5,121	31-16	17–5
May 6	at Louisiana–Lafayette		M.L. Tigue Moore Field • Lafayette, LA	W 10-3	4,768	32-16	18–6
May 9	North Carolina	#3	Springs Brooks Stadium • Conway, SC	W 5-2	2,616	33-16	18–6
May 11	Little Rock		Springs Brooks Stadium • Conway, SC	W 4-0	1,139	34-16	19–6
May 12	Little Rock		Springs Brooks Stadium • Conway, SC	W 6-4	1,337	35-16	20–6
May 13	Little Rock		Springs Brooks Stadium • Conway, SC	W 1-0	1,441	36-16	21–6
May 18	at Appalachian State		Beaver Field • Boone, NC	W 10-4	375	37–16	22-6
May 18	at Appalachian State		Beaver Field • Boone, NC	W 10-5	375	38–16	23-6
May 18	at Appalachian State		Beaver Field • Boone, NC	L 7-11	375	38–17	23-7

Post-season (4–0)

Sun Belt Conference Tournament (4–0)
Date	Opponent	Rank	Site	Score	Attendance	Overall record	SBCT Record
May 23	vs. Texas–Arlington		M.L. Tigue Moore Field • Lafayette, LA	W 12–2 (8)	167	39–17	1–0
May 24	vs. South Alabama		M.L. Tigue Moore Field • Lafayette, LA	W 16-4	287	40–17	2–0
May 26	vs. South Alabama		M.L. Tigue Moore Field • Lafayette, LA	W 3–1	164	41–17	3–0
May 27	vs. Troy		M.L. Tigue Moore Field • Lafayette, LA	W 11–6	215	42–17	4–0

NCAA Conway Regional (1-2)
Date	Opponent	Rank	Site/stadium	Score	Attendance	Overall record	NCAAT record
June 1	vs. LIU Brooklyn		Springs Brooks Stadium • Conway, SC	W 16–1	3,736	43-17	1-0
June 2	vs. Washington		Springs Brooks Stadium • Conway, SC	L 6–11	3,205	43-18	1-1
June 3	vs. UConn		Springs Brooks Stadium • Conway, SC	L 5–6	2,392	43-19	1-2

== Rankings ==
Ranking movements Legend: ██ Increase in ranking ██ Decrease in ranking — = Not ranked
	Week																		
Poll	Pre	1	2	3	4	5	6	7	8	9	10	11	12	13	14	15	16	17	Final
Coaches'	—	—*	—*	24	—	—	22	24	21	22	19	16	23	20	19	14	15*	15*	—
Baseball America	—	—	—	24	—	—	24	18	17	16	16	15	18	16	15	13	13*	13*	24
Collegiate Baseball^	—	—	—	21	30	27	20	27	29	29	30	24	28	24	24	17	28	28	28
NCBWA†	—	—	—	28	—	30	23	21	21	20	20	16	21	21	20	15	24	24*	24

^ Collegiate Baseball ranked 40 teams in their preseason poll, but only ranked 30 teams weekly during the season.
† NCBWA ranks 30 teams in their preseason poll, but only ranks 25 teams weekly during the season.
* A new poll was not released for this week, so for comparison purposes, the previous week's ranking is inserted in this week's slot.
