= 2018 Big East Conference baseball tournament =

American college baseball tournament

- Teams: 4
- Format: Double-elimination tournament
- Finals site: Prasco Park; Mason, Ohio
- Champions: St. John's (9th title)
- Winning coach: Ed Blankmeyer (5th title)
- MVP: Jeff Belge (St. John's)
- Television: Big East DN (Thurs–Sat); FS2 (Sun)

2018 Big East Conference baseball standings
| | Conf. | | | | | | Overall |
| Team | W | | L | | T | PCT | W | | L | | T | PCT |
|---|---|---|---|---|---|---|---|---|---|---|---|---|
| St. John's ‍‍‡‍^{y} | 15 | – | 3 | – | 0 | .833 | 36 | – | 14 | – | 0 | .720 |
| Seton Hall ‍‍‍ | 13 | – | 4 | – | 0 | .765 | 27 | – | 18 | – | 1 | .598 |
| Butler ‍‍‍ | 9 | – | 8 | – | 0 | .529 | 33 | – | 18 | – | 0 | .647 |
| Georgetown ‍‍‍ | 8 | – | 9 | – | 0 | .471 | 25 | – | 28 | – | 0 | .472 |
| Creighton ‍‍‍ | 8 | – | 9 | – | 0 | .471 | 34 | – | 16 | – | 0 | .680 |
| Xavier ‍‍‍ | 7 | – | 11 | – | 0 | .389 | 20 | – | 35 | – | 0 | .364 |
| Villanova ‍‍‍ | 1 | – | 17 | – | 0 | .056 | 9 | – | 39 | – | 0 | .188 |
‡ – Tournament champion y – Invited to the NCAA tournament As of May 20, 2018; Rankings from Collegiate Baseball

The 2018 Big East Conference baseball tournament was held at Prasco Park in Mason, Ohio, from May 24 through 27. The event, held at the end of the conference regular season, determined the champion of the Big East Conference for the 2018 season. As winner of the double-elimination tournament, St. John's received the conference's automatic bid to the 2018 NCAA Division I baseball tournament.

== Format and seeding ==
The tournament will use a double-elimination format and feature the top four finishers of the Big East's seven teams.

== Bracket ==
First round
1 | St. John's | 5
4 | Georgetown | 2
2 | Seton Hall | 1
3 | Butler | 2^{13}
Lower round 1
4 | Georgetown | 5
2 | Seton Hall | 21

Semi-finals
1 | St. John's | 12
3 | Butler | 8
Lower final
3 | Butler | 3
2 | Seton Hall | 4

Finals
1 | St. John's
2 | Seton Hall
