= St. John's Red Storm baseball =

American college baseball team

- 2026 St. John's Red Storm baseball
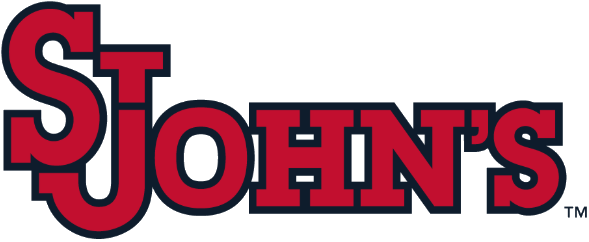
- Founded: 1906; 120 years ago
- University: St. John's University
- Head coach: Mike Hampton (7th season)
- Conference: Big East
- Home stadium: Jack Kaiser Stadium (capacity: 3,500)
- Nickname: Red Storm
- Colors: Red and white

College World Series appearances
- 1949, 1960, 1966, 1968, 1978, 1980

NCAA regional champions
- 1978, 1980, 2012, 2026

NCAA tournament appearances
- 1949, 1954, 1956, 1957, 1960, 1961, 1962, 1963, 1964, 1966, 1967, 1968, 1972, 1974, 1975, 1976, 1977, 1978, 1979, 1980, 1981, 1985, 1986, 1988, 1991, 1993, 1997, 2004, 2005, 2007, 2008, 2010, 2011, 2012, 2015, 2017, 2018, 2024, 2026

Conference tournament champions
- 1985, 1986, 1988, 1993, 1997, 2010, 2012, 2015, 2018, 2024, 2026

Conference regular season champions
- 1987, 1991, 1992, 2005, 2007, 2008, 2012, 2015, 2018, 2026

The St. John's Red Storm baseball team represents St. John's University, in New York City in college baseball. The program is classified in the NCAA Division I, and the team competes in the Big East Conference. The team is coached by Mike Hampton. The St. John's baseball team has been to the College World Series six times and have sent more than 100 players on to professional baseball careers.

== History ==
The St. John's baseball team has been to the College World Series six times, recorded 34 NCAA appearances, 8 Big East Championships and have sent 70 players on to professional baseball careers. The team plays at the 3,500-seat Jack Kaiser Stadium, dedicated in 2007 to the Hall of Fame Coach and former St. John's Athletic Director. The stadium is one of the largest college baseball stadiums in the northeast, and is a featured venue on the EA Sports MVP NCAA baseball video game.

The stadium was conceived out of a deal between the university and the Giuliani administration. The administration wanted to find a location for a single-A team that would be affiliated with the New York Mets. Expressing concern about quality of life issues and the spending of public money for a private religious institution, surrounding neighborhood civic groups and local politicians protested the plan. In order to placate their concerns, however, the Mets offered to open it up to the communities for local high school games and youth programs. This stadium was built despite large protests by community residents as well as State Senator Frank Padavan (while also using city financing). The Red Storm played the first-ever game at the Mets' new ballpark, Citi Field on March 29, 2009.

St. John's has won nine Big East Championships in 1987, 1991, 1992, 2005, 2007, 2008, 2012, 2015, and 2018. It has also won the Big East tournament ten times, in 1985, 1986, 1988, 1993, 1997, 2010, 2012, 2015, 2018, and 2024, the most of any school.

The program has appeared in 37 NCAA Regionals and six College World Series, with its highest place finish being fourth place in 1968 and its most recent appearance in 1980.

== Facilities ==
The team plays at the 3,500-seat Jack Kaiser Stadium, dedicated in 2007, to the Hall of Fame Coach and former St. John's Athletic Director. The stadium is one of the largest college baseball stadiums in the northeast, and is a featured venue on the EA Sports MVP NCAA Baseball video game. The stadium was conceived out of a deal between the university and the Giuliani administration. The administration wanted to find a location for a single-A team that would be affiliated with the New York Mets. Expressing concern about quality of life issues and the spending of public money for a private religious institution, surrounding neighborhood civic groups and local politicians protested the plan. In order to placate their concerns, however, the Mets offered to open it up to the communities for local high school games and youth programs. This stadium was built despite large protests by community residents as well as State Senator Frank Padavan (while also using city financing) The Red Storm played the first ever game at the Mets' new ballpark, Citi Field on March 29, 2009.

== Coaches ==
*	Elected to the American Baseball Coaches Association Hall of Fame

Under Ed Blankmeyer, St. John's won six Big East Conference Regular season Championships and five Big East Tournament championships. They appeared in ten NCAA Regionals and one NCAA Super Regional. Blankmeyer has received the Big East Conference's top coaching award eight times—six times as the head coach during the era in which the award was styled as "Coach of the Year" and presented solely to a head coach, and twice more under the award's current incarnation as the "Coaching Staff of the Year" award, presented to an entire staff. He has also received four ABCA Northeast Region Coach of the Year Awards.

On January 9, 2020, Mike Hampton was promoted to the interim head baseball coach at St. John's following Ed Blankmeyer's resignation to join the Brooklyn Cyclones. In 2024, Hampton led St. John's to a conference record tenth Big East tournament championship, eleventh coach of the Year honors, and thirty-eighth NCAA tournament appearance, their first since 2018.

Only those who coached 3 or more seasons and 30 or more games.

Coach	Years	Overall	%	Conf	%	BET	%	NCAA Post Season					
Coach	Years	Overall	%	Conf	%	BET	%	Overall	%	Super Reg	%	CWS	%
Buck Freeman	1928–1936	89–71	.556	—	—	—	—	—	—	—	—	—	—
Joe Lapchick	1937–1943	69–36	.657	—	—	—	—	—	—	—	—	—	—
Frank McGuire	1948–1952	67–30	.691	—	—	—	—	1–2	.333	—	—	0–2	.000
Dusty DeStefano	1953–1955	39–15–1	.718	—	—	—	—	1–1	.500	—	—	—	—
Jack Kaiser	1956–1973	367–133–2	.733	—	—	—	—	19–16	.543	—	—	5–6	.455
Joe Russo	1974–1995	612–310–4	.663	128–81	.612	—	—	27–26	.509	—	—	1–4	.200
Ed Blankmeyer	1996–2019	829–499–4	.624	347–212	.621	—	—	14–21	.400	—	—	—	—
Mike Hampton	2020–present	112–104–2	.439	39–47–1	.454	—	—	1–2	.333	—	—	—	—

== Notable players ==
=== MLB First Round Picks ===
Year	Player	Pick	Team
1970	Allan Matson	16	Philadelphia Phillies
1994	C.J. Nitkowski	9	Cincinnati Reds
2005	Craig Hansen	26	Boston Red Sox
2011	Joe Panik	29	San Francisco Giants

=== First Team All-Americans ===
Year(s)	Player	Position	Selectors
1981	Frank Viola	Pitcher	Baseball America
2005	Craig Hansen	Pitcher	Baseball America
2010	Jeremy Baltz	Outfielder	Baseball America

=== Individual awards ===
==== National Awards ====
- NCBWA National Freshman Hitter of the Year

Jeremy Baltz (2010)

- NCBWA National Freshman Pitcher of the Year

Sean Mooney (2017)

==== Big East Awards ====
- Rookie/Freshman of the Year

Rich Aurilia (1990)
Mike Maerten (1991)
Jeremy Baltz (2010)
Michael Donadio (2014)
Josh Shaw (2016)
Sean Mooney (2017)

- Player of the Year

John Valente (2018)

- Pitcher of the Year

Tom Migliozzi (1991)
C.J. Nitkowski (1994)
Craig Hansen (2005)
George Brown (2008)
Ryan McCormick (2015)
Thomas Hackimer (2016)
Sean Mooney (2017)

- Jack Kaiser Award/Big East Tournament Most Outstanding Player

Tom Finke (1986)
Mike Weinberg (1988)
Mike Maerten (1993)
Mike Dzurilla (1997)
Kyle Hansen (2010)
Matt Carasiti (2012)
Alex Caruso (2015)
Jeff Belge (2018)
Jimmy Keenan (2024)
