= 2018 Summit League baseball tournament =

- Teams: 4
- Format: Double-elimination
- Finals site: J. L. Johnson Stadium; Tulsa, Oklahoma
- Champions: Oral Roberts (19th title)
- Winning coach: Ryan Folmar (4th title)
- MVP: Cal Hernandez (Oral Roberts)

2018 Summit League baseball standings
	Conf.				Overall
Team	W		L	PCT	W		L	PCT
Oral Roberts ‍‍‍	24	–	6	.800	35	–	18	.660
Western Illinois ‍‍‍	14	–	12	.538	17	–	28	.378
North Dakota State ‍‍‍	15	–	13	.536	25	–	22	.532
South Dakota State ‍‍‍	14	–	13	.519	16	–	30	.348
Omaha ‍‍‍	10	–	17	.370	15	–	35	.300
Fort Wayne ‍‍‍	7	–	23	.233	11	–	37	.229
‡ – Tournament champion As of May 20, 2018; Rankings from Collegiate Baseball

The 2018 Summit League baseball tournament took place from May 23 through 26. The top four regular season finishers of the league's six teams met in the double-elimination tournament held at J. L. Johnson Stadium on the campus of Oral Roberts in Tulsa, Oklahoma. Oral Roberts won the tournament and earned the Summit League's automatic bid to the 2018 NCAA Division I baseball tournament.

== Seeding ==
The top four finishers from the regular season were seeded one through four based on conference winning percentage during the double round robin regular season. The teams then played a double elimination tournament.

== Results ==
First round
1	Oral Roberts	13
4	South Dakota State	8
2	Western Illinois	0
3	North Dakota State	2
Lower round 1
2	Western Illinois	4
4	South Dakota State	8

Semi-finals
1	Oral Roberts	6
3	North Dakota State	4
Lower final
4	South Dakota State	13
3	North Dakota State	7

Finals
1	Oral Roberts	11
4	South Dakota State	3
