= 2018 Colonial Athletic Association baseball tournament =

American college baseball tournament

- Teams: 6
- Format: Modified Double-elimination tournament
- Finals site: Eagle Field at Veterans Memorial Park; Harrisonburg, Virginia
- Champions: UNC Wilmington (5th title)
- Winning coach: Mark Scalf (5th title)
- MVP: Cole Weiss (UNC Wilmington)
- Television: CAA TV (Wed-Fri); Sports Live (Sat)

2018 Colonial Athletic Association baseball standings
	Conf.				Overall
Team	W		L	PCT	W		L	PCT
Northeastern ‍†‍‍^{y}	17	–	6	.739	36	–	21	.632
Elon ‍‍‍	16	–	8	.667	36	–	23	.610
College of Charleston ‍‍‍	15	–	8	.652	36	–	19	.655
UNC Wilmington ‍‍‡‍^{y}	14	–	9	.609	39	–	23	.629
Delaware ‍‍‍	12	–	11	.522	31	–	27	.534
Hofstra ‍‍‍	12	–	12	.500	23	–	23	.500
James Madison ‍‍‍	11	–	13	.458	26	–	26	.500
Towson ‍‍‍	6	–	18	.250	13	–	42	.236
William & Mary ‍‍‍	3	–	21	.125	15	–	39	.278
† – Conference champion ‡ – Tournament champion y – Invited to the NCAA tournament As of June 30, 2018; Rankings from Collegiate Baseball

The 2018 Colonial Athletic Association baseball tournament was held at Eagle Field at Veterans Memorial Park in Harrisonburg, Virginia, from May 23 through 26. The winner of the tournament, UNC Wilmington, earned the Colonial Athletic Association's automatic bid to the 2018 NCAA Division I baseball tournament.

Entering the event, UNC Wilmington had won the most championships among active teams, with four. James Madison and William & Mary had claimed two titles, while Delaware, Towson and fifth-year member College of Charleston each had one. Former member East Carolina won 7 titles during their tenure in the conference.

== Seeding and format ==
Continuing the format adopted in 2012, the top six finishers from the regular season competed in the modified double-elimination tournament.

Team	W	L	Pct.	GB	Seed
Northeastern	17	6	.739	—	1
Elon	16	8	.667	1.5	2
College of Charleston	15	8	.652	2	3
UNC Wilmington	14	9	.609	3	4
Delaware	12	11	.522	5	5
Hofstra	12	12	.500	5.5	6
James Madison	11	13	.458	6.5	—
Towson	6	18	.250	11.5	—
William & Mary	3	21	.125	14.5	—

== Bracket ==
Upper round 1	Upper round 2	Upper final	Final
1	Northeastern	2
4	UNC Wilmington	2	4	UNC Wilmington	9
5	Delaware	1	4	UNC Wilmington	11
2	Elon	3
2	Elon	3^{12}
3	College of Charleston	10	3	College of Charleston	2
6	Hofstra	3
4	UNC Wilmington	2	7
1	Northeastern	3	4
Lower round 1	Lower round 2	Lower round 3	Lower final
2	Elon	4
5	Delaware	2	1	Northeastern	5
5	Delaware	5	1	Northeastern	7
5	Delaware	3	3	College of Charleston	1
6	Hofstra	1

== All-Tournament Team ==
The following players were named to the All-Tournament Team.

Name	School
Kyle Baker	Delaware
Kyle Brnovich	Elon
Ian Fair	Northeastern
Jake Farrell	Northeastern
Scott Holzwasser	Northeastern
Ryan Jeffers	UNC Wilmington
Greg Jones	UNC Wilmington
Kyle Murphy	Northeastern
Alex Royalty	UNC Wilmington
Billy Sullivan IV	Delaware
Austin Warren	UNC Wilmington
Cole Weiss	UNC Wilmington

=== Most Valuable Player ===
Cole Weiss was named Tournament Most Valuable Player. Weiss was a third baseman for UNC Wilmington.
