= Kevin Moulder =

Current position
- Title: Head coach
- Team: Jefferson College
- Conference: MCCAC
- Record: 47–10

Biographical details
- Born: September 15, 1980 (age 46)

Playing career
- 2001: STLCC
- 2002–2003: Murray State
- Position: Pitcher

Coaching career (HC unless noted)
- 2004: STLCC (assistant)
- 2005: Lake City (assistant)
- 2006–2007: Central Missouri
- 2008–2014: Saint Louis (assistant)
- 2015–2018: Murray State
- 2019–present: Jefferson College (MO)

Head coaching record
- Overall: 148–141

Kevin Moulder is in American college baseball coach, most recently serving as head coach of the Murray State Racers baseball team. He played at STLCC and Murray State prior to turning to coaching. After two seasons as an assistant at the junior college level, he earned the head coaching job at Division II Central Missouri. After two seasons, he became an assistant at Saint Louis. In 2015, he was named head coach at Murray State. After four losing seasons as the head coach at Murray State, Moulder was relieved of his duties. Moulder now serves as the head coach of the Jefferson College (Missouri) Vikings in Hillsboro, Missouri
