= 2018 Sun Belt Conference baseball tournament =

- Teams: 10
- Format: Double-elimination
- Finals site: M. L. Tigue Moore Field; Lafayette, Louisiana
- Champions: Coastal Carolina (1 title)
- Winning coach: Gary Gilmore (1 title)
- MVP: Zach Biermann ((Coastal Carolina))
- Television: ESPN+

2018 Sun Belt Conference baseball standings
	Conf.						Overall
Team	W		L		T	PCT	W		L		T	PCT
East Division
No. 21 Coastal Carolina ^{x}‍‍‡‍^{y}	23	–	7	–	0	.767	38	–	17	–	0	.691
Troy ‍‍‍^{y}	19	–	11	–	0	.633	38	–	18	–	0	.679
South Alabama ‍‍‍	18	–	11	–	0	.621	30	–	23	–	0	.566
Georgia Southern ‍‍‍	18	–	11	–	0	.621	29	–	24	–	0	.547
Georgia State ‍‍‍	10	–	19	–	0	.345	26	–	28	–	0	.481
Appalachian State ‍‍‍	9	–	21	–	0	.300	18	–	36	–	0	.333
West Division
Louisiana ^{x}‍‍‍	18	–	12	–	0	.600	33	–	23	–	0	.589
Texas State ‍‍‍	16	–	14	–	0	.533	28	–	26	–	1	.518
Little Rock ‍‍‍	15	–	14	–	0	.517	28	–	25	–	0	.528
Arkansas State ‍‍‍	11	–	19	–	0	.367	20	–	30	–	0	.400
UT Arlington ‍‍‍	11	–	19	–	0	.367	21	–	33	–	0	.389
Louisiana–Monroe ‍‍‍	10	–	20	–	0	.333	23	–	31	–	0	.426
x – Division champion ‡ – Tournament champion y – Invited to the NCAA tournament As of May 20, 2018; Rankings from Collegiate Baseball

The 2018 Sun Belt Conference baseball tournament was held at M. L. Tigue Moore Field on the campus of the University of Louisiana at Lafayette in Lafayette, Louisiana, from May 22 to May 27, 2018. The tournament used a double-elimination format as in past years. Coastal Carolina, the winner of the tournament, earned the Sun Belt Conference's automatic bid to the 2018 NCAA Division I baseball tournament.

== Seeding ==
In a change from previous years, the top ten teams (based on conference results) from the conference earned invites to the tournament. The teams were seeded based on conference winning percentage, with the bottom four seeds competing in a play-in round. The remaining eight teams then played a two bracket, double-elimination tournament. The winner of each bracket played each other in the championship final.

== Results ==
=== Play-in round ===
Tuesday, May 22
Team	R
#10 Georgia State	1
#7 Little Rock	2

Tuesday, May 22
Team	R
#9 Arkansas State	4
#8 Texas Arlington	5^{10}

=== Double-elimination round ===
First round
1	Coastal Carolina	12^{8}
8	Texas Arlington	2
4	South Alabama	5
5	Georgia Southern	3
5	Georgia Southern	3
8	Texas Arlington	1
3	Troy	5
6	Texas State	1
2	Louisiana	19
7	Little Rock	16
6	Texas State	6
7	Little Rock	3

Second round
1	Coastal Carolina	16
4	South Alabama	4
5	Georgia Southern	0
4	South Alabama	12^{7}
3	Troy	10
2	Louisiana	1
6	Texas State	11^{7}
2	Louisiana	1

Semifinals
1	Coastal Carolina	3	-
4	South Alabama	1	-
3	Troy	10	–
6	Texas State	0	–

Finals
1	Coastal Carolina	11
3	Troy	6

== Notes ==
- Louisiana's 19–16 victory over Little Rock sets a tournament record for most combined runs (35).
