= Harmon Stadium =

Baseball stadium in Jacksonville, Florida, US

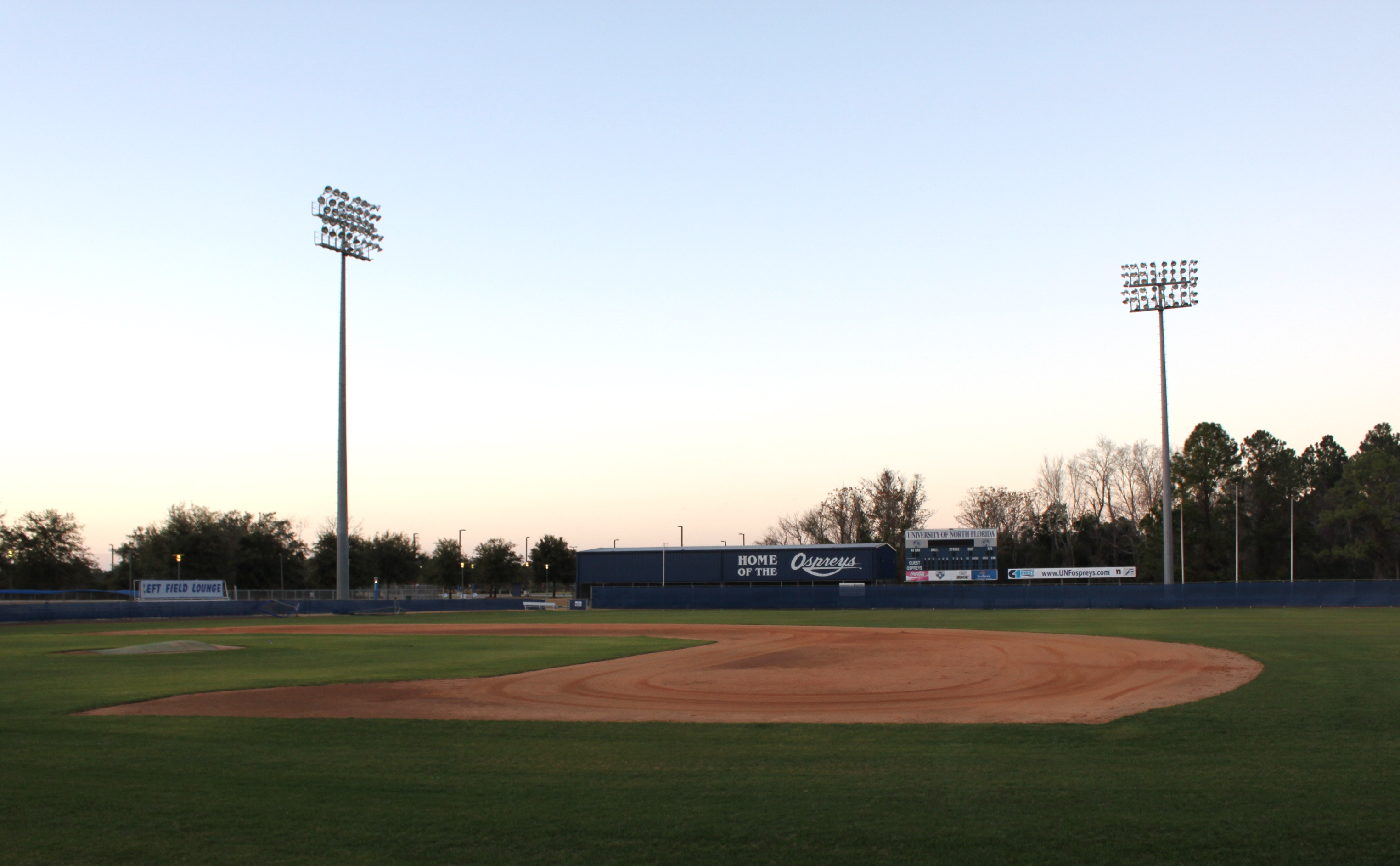
- Interactive map of Harmon Stadium
- Location: Jacksonville, Florida, United States
- Coordinates: 30.274505°N 81.508759°W
- Owner: University of North Florida
- Capacity: 1,250
- Surface: Grass
- Field size: Left Field - 325 ft (99.1 m); Left-Center - 365 ft (111.3 m); Center Field - 400 ft (121.9 m); Right-Center - 365 ft (111.3 m); Right Field - 325 ft (99.1 m)

Construction
- Opened: 1988

Tenant
- North Florida Ospreys baseball (NCAA)

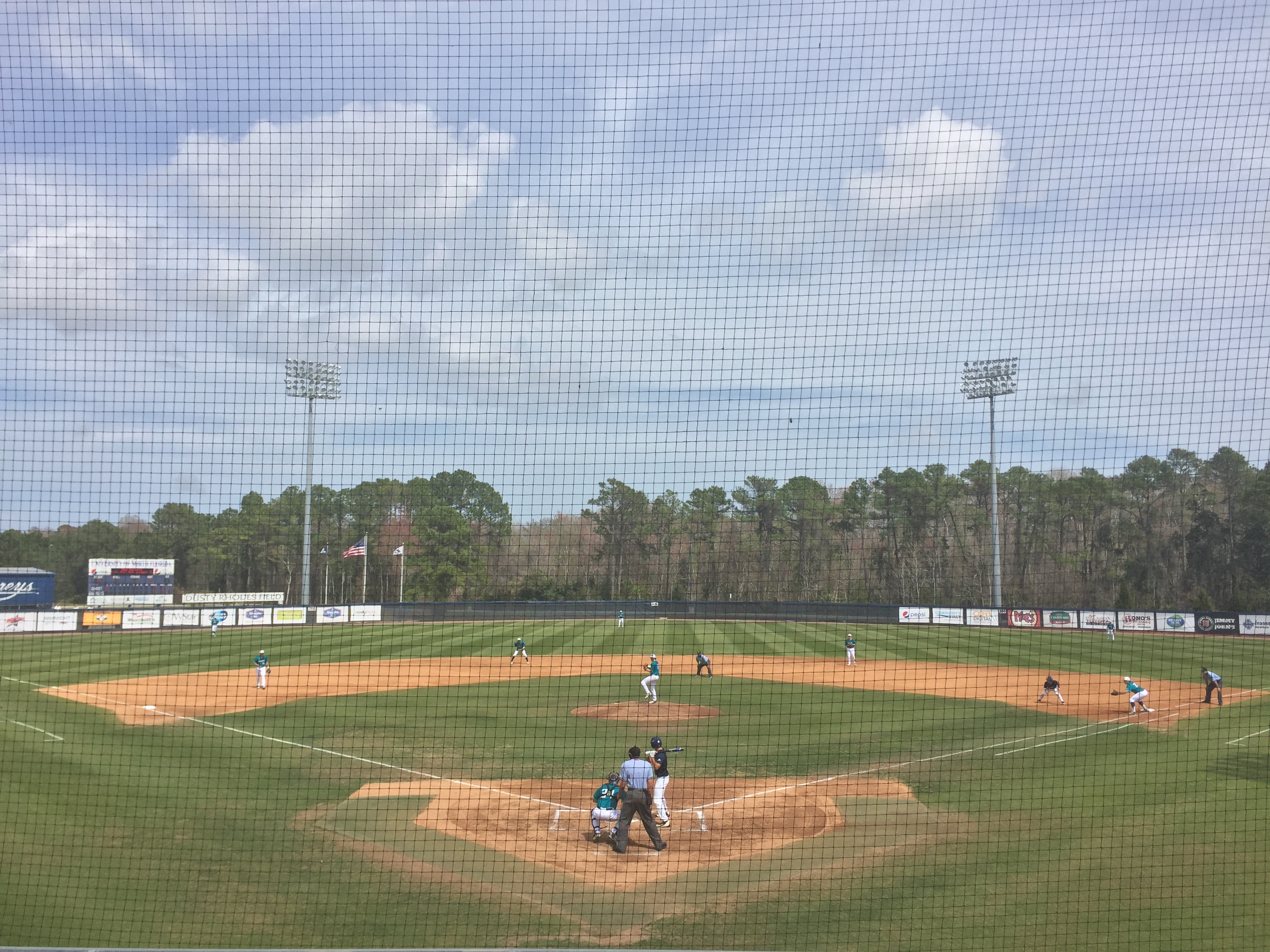
The Ospreys at home versus UNC Wilmington in 2016.

Dusty Rhodes Field at Harmon Stadium, generally known as Harmon Stadium, is the baseball stadium at the University of North Florida (UNF), and the home field of the North Florida Ospreys baseball team. It is located on the university's campus in Jacksonville, Florida, near the softball complex and aquatic center. It opened in 1988 and has a seating capacity of 1,250. The stadium is named for Doug and Linda Harmon for their contributions to constructions costs, while the field is named after UNF's first baseball coach, Dusty Rhodes.

== Features ==
The "James J. Patton Osprey Nest" is an enclosed seating area for 100 people with kitchen facilities, restrooms, and the Osprey Baseball "Wall of Fame". The "Dusty Rhodes Batting Facility" is a covered training facility with hitting cages, pitching machines, and several indoor pitching mounds.

== See also ==
- List of NCAA Division I baseball venues
