= 1996 College Baseball All-America Team =

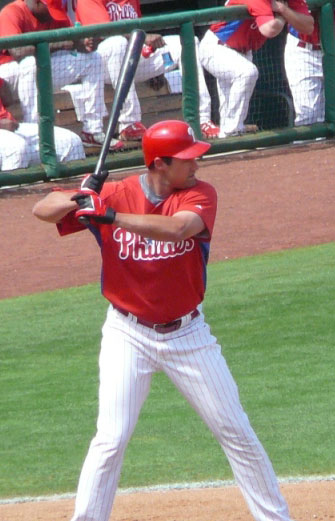
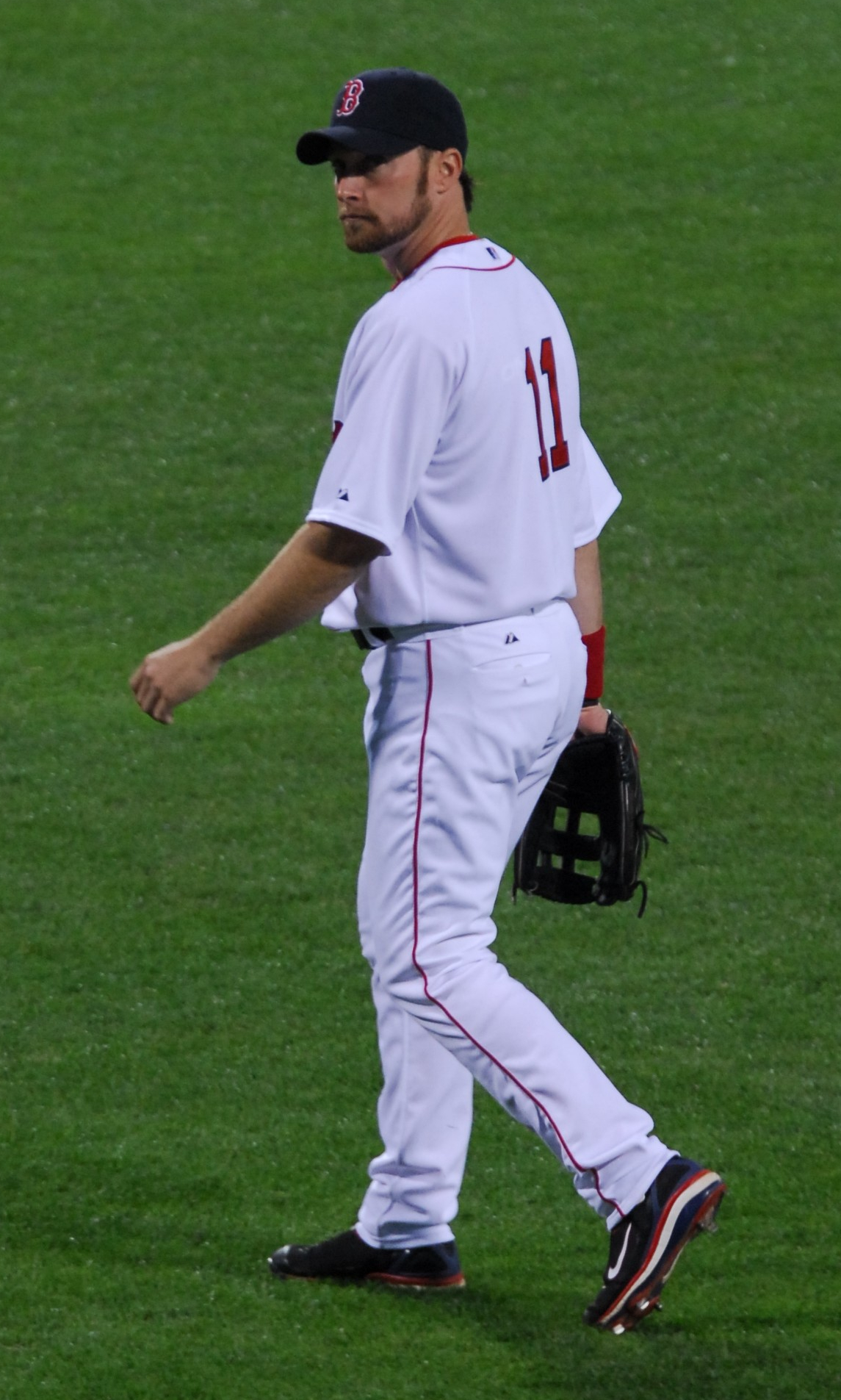
1996 All-Americans included two-time World Series champion Pat Burrell (left) and Unanimous 1996 & 1997 All-American Mark Kotsay (right).

This is a list of college baseball players named first team All-Americans for the 1996 NCAA Division I baseball season. From 1994 to 1996, there were four generally recognized All-America selectors for baseball: the American Baseball Coaches Association, Baseball America, Collegiate Baseball Newspaper, and the National Collegiate Baseball Writers Association. In order to be considered a "consensus" All-American, a player must have been selected by at least three of these.

== Key ==
A	American Baseball Coaches Association
B	Baseball America
C	Collegiate Baseball Newspaper
N	National Collegiate Baseball Writers Association – branded as the Smith Super Team
	Member of the National College Baseball Hall of Fame
	Consensus All-American – selected by all four organizations
	Consensus All-American – selected by three organizations

== All-Americans ==
Position	Name	School	#	A	B	C	N	Other awards and honors
Starting pitcher	J. D. Arteaga	Miami (FL)	1	—	—	—	✓	
Starting pitcher	Kris Benson	Clemson	4	✓	✓	✓	✓	Dick Howser Trophy ABCA Player of the Year Baseball America Player of the Year Collegiate Baseball Player of the Year Rotary Smith Award First overall pick in the 1996 MLB draft
Starting pitcher	Brian Carmody	Santa Clara	1	—	—	—	✓	
Starting pitcher	Randy Choate	Florida State	1	—	—	—	✓	
Starting pitcher	R. A. Dickey	Tennessee	2	—	—	✓	✓	
Starting pitcher	Seth Greisinger	Virginia	4	✓	✓	✓	✓	
Starting pitcher	Evan Thomas	FIU	4	✓	✓	✓	✓	
Starting pitcher	Jeff Weaver	Fresno State	1	—	—	—	✓	
Starting pitcher	Eddie Yarnall	LSU	2	✓	✓	—	—	
Relief pitcher	Braden Looper	Wichita State	4	✓	✓	✓	✓	
Relief pitcher	Robbie Morrison	Miami (FL)	1	—	—	✓	—	
Catcher	Robert Fick	Cal State Northridge	3	—	✓	✓	✓	
Catcher	A. J. Hinch	Stanford	2	✓	—	—	✓	
Catcher	Dax Norris	Alabama	1	—	—	—	✓	
First baseman / DH	Eddy Furniss	LSU	4	✓	✓	✓	✓	
First baseman / Utility	Travis Lee	San Diego State	2	✓	✓	—	—	Golden Spikes Award
First baseman	Danny Peoples	Texas	1	—	—	—	✓	
First baseman	Tommy Peterman	Georgia Southern	1	—	—	—	✓	
Second baseman	David Eckstein	Florida	1	—	—	—	✓	
Second baseman	Josh Kliner	Kansas	2	✓	✓	—	—	
Second baseman	Travis Young	New Mexico	2	—	—	✓	✓	
Shortstop	Kip Harkrider	Texas	1	—	—	—	✓	
Shortstop	Josh Klimek	Illinois	4	✓	✓	✓	✓	
Third baseman	Casey Blake	Wichita State	1	—	—	—	✓	
Third baseman	Clint Bryant	Texas Tech	2	✓	—	—	✓	
Third baseman / DH	Pat Burrell	Miami (FL)	4	✓	✓	✓	✓	College World Series Most Outstanding Player
Outfielder	J. D. Drew	Florida State	4	✓	✓	✓	✓	
Outfielder	Ryan Fry	Missouri	1	—	—	—	✓	
Outfielder	Chad Green	Kentucky	3	✓	✓	—	✓	
Outfielder	Jeff Guiel	Oklahoma State	2	✓	—	—	✓	
Outfielder	Jacque Jones	USC	1	—	—	—	✓	
Outfielder	Matt Kastelic	Texas Tech	1	—	—	✓	—	
Outfielder	Mark Kotsay	Cal State Fullerton	4	✓	✓	✓	✓	
Designated hitter	Jason Grabowski	UConn	1	—	—	✓	—	
Utility player	Lance Berkman	Rice	1	—	—	—	✓	
Utility player	Brad Wilkerson	Florida	1	—	—	—	✓	
Utility player	Travis Wyckoff	Wichita State	1	—	—	✓	—	

== See also ==
- List of college baseball awards
