= 1996 Miami Hurricanes baseball team =

American college baseball season

1996 Miami Hurricanes baseball

Central I Regional Champions

College World Series, Runner-Up
- Conference: Independent

Ranking
- Coaches: No. 2
- CB: No. 2
- Record: 50–14
- Head coach: Jim Morris (3rd season)
- Home stadium: Mark Light Field

1996 NCAA Division I baseball independents standings
	Conf.				Overall
Team	W		L	PCT	W		L	PCT
No. 2 Miami (FL) ‍‍‍^{y}		–		–	50	–	14	.781
Oral Roberts ‍‍‍		–		–	32	–	24	.571
Hawaii–Hilo ‍‍‍		–		–	14	–	31	.311
Wofford ‍‍‍		–		–	8	–	35	.186
Colgate ‍‍‍		–		–	3	–	20	.130
Southern Utah ‍‍‍		–		–		–		–
y – Invited to the NCAA tournament As of June 30, 1996; Rankings from Collegiate Baseball

The 1996 Miami Hurricanes baseball team represented the University of Miami in the 1996 NCAA Division I baseball season. The Hurricanes played their home games at the original Mark Light Field. The team was coached by Jim Morris in his 3rd season at Miami.

The Hurricanes lost the College World Series, defeated by the LSU Tigers in the championship game.

== Roster ==
1996 Miami Hurricanes roster
Pitchers: J. D. Arteaga - Junior; Juan Galban; John Kertis; Robbie Morrison; Denis Pujals; Clint Weibl; Allen Westfall	Catchers: Jim Gargiulo; Infielders: 11 Pat Burrell - Freshman; Alex Cora - Junior; Rudy Gomez - Junior; Kenard Lang; T. R. Marcinczyk	Outfielders: Michael DeCelle - Junior; Ryan Grimmett; Tris Moore; Eddie Rivero

== Schedule and results ==
Legend
Miami win
Miami loss
Miami tie

1996 Miami Hurricanes baseball game log
Regular season (43–12)
January (1–0)

Date	Opponent	Site/stadium	Score	Overall Record
January 31	Berry	Mark Light Field • Coral Gables, Florida	25–0	1–0

February (8–3)

Date	Opponent	Site/stadium	Score	Overall Record
February 2	Florida	Mark Light Field • Coral Gables, Florida	4–7	1–1
February 3	Florida	Mark Light Field • Coral Gables, Florida	5–1	2–1
February 9	Coastal Carolina	Mark Light Field • Coral Gables, Florida	8–3	3–1
February 10	Coastal Carolina	Mark Light Field • Coral Gables, Florida	7–2	4–1
February 11	Coastal Carolina	Mark Light Field • Coral Gables, Florida	16–11	5–1
February 16	George Washington	Mark Light Field • Coral Gables, Florida	6–0	6–1
February 17	George Washington	Mark Light Field • Coral Gables, Florida	14–1	7–1
February 18	George Washington	Mark Light Field • Coral Gables, Florida	19–3	8–1
February 21	Florida Atlantic	Mark Light Field • Coral Gables, Florida	12–3	9–1
February 24	at Florida	Alfred A. McKethan Stadium • Gainesville, Florida	7–8	9–2
February 25	at Florida	Alfred A. McKethan Stadium • Gainesville, Florida	1–5	9–3

March (14–2)

Date	Opponent	Site/stadium	Score	Overall Record
March 1	Illinois	Mark Light Field • Coral Gables, Florida	14–10	10–3
March 2	Illinois	Mark Light Field • Coral Gables, Florida	10–0	11–3
March 3	Illinois	Mark Light Field • Coral Gables, Florida	6–4	12–3
March 6	Michigan State	Mark Light Field • Coral Gables, Florida	10–3	13–3
March 8	Rutgers	Mark Light Field • Coral Gables, Florida	4–5	13–4
March 9	Rutgers	Mark Light Field • Coral Gables, Florida	12–3	14–4
March 15	Maine	Mark Light Field • Coral Gables, Florida	17–4	15–4
March 16	Maine	Mark Light Field • Coral Gables, Florida	10–3	16–4
March 17	Maine	Mark Light Field • Coral Gables, Florida	15–3	17–4
March 21	FIU	Mark Light Field • Coral Gables, Florida	13–6	18–4
March 22	FIU	Mark Light Field • Coral Gables, Florida	5–3	19–4
March 23	FIU	Mark Light Field • Coral Gables, Florida	5–4	20–4
March 24	FIU	Mark Light Field • Coral Gables, Florida	5–6	20–5
March 27	St. Thomas (FL)	Mark Light Field • Coral Gables, Florida	8–0	21–5
March 29	Bethune–Cookman	Mark Light Field • Coral Gables, Florida	10–3	22–5
March 30	Bethune–Cookman	Mark Light Field • Coral Gables, Florida	20–3	23–5

April (11–5)

Date	Opponent	Site/stadium	Score	Overall Record
April 2	Nova Southeastern	Mark Light Field • Coral Gables, Florida	13–2	24–5
April 5	at Florida State	Dick Howser Stadium • Tallahassee, Florida	2–13	24–6
April 6	at Florida State	Dick Howser Stadium • Tallahassee, Florida	2–1	25–6
April 7	at Florida State	Dick Howser Stadium • Tallahassee, Florida	1–15	25–7
April 10	St. Thomas (FL)	Mark Light Field • Coral Gables, Florida	15–2	26–7
April 12	Florida State	Mark Light Field • Coral Gables, Florida	6–2	27–7
April 13	Florida State	Mark Light Field • Coral Gables, Florida	9–8	28–7
April 14	Florida State	Mark Light Field • Coral Gables, Florida	7–4	29–7
April 16	at Tennessee	Lindsey Nelson Stadium • Knoxville, Tennessee	1–12	29–8
April 17	at Tennessee	Lindsey Nelson Stadium • Knoxville, Tennessee	2–4	29–9
April 18	at Tennessee	Lindsey Nelson Stadium • Knoxville, Tennessee	2–3	29–10
April 20	Tampa	Mark Light Field • Coral Gables, Florida	5–3	30–10
April 21	Tampa	Mark Light Field • Coral Gables, Florida	2–1	31–10
April 26	Stetson	Mark Light Field • Coral Gables, Florida	20–7	32–10
April 27	Stetson	Mark Light Field • Coral Gables, Florida	7–6	33–10
April 28	Stetson	Mark Light Field • Coral Gables, Florida	9–4	34–10

May (9–2)

Date	Opponent	Site/stadium	Score	Overall Record
May 1	Lynn	Mark Light Field • Coral Gables, Florida	12–4	35–10
May 3	South Florida	Mark Light Field • Coral Gables, Florida	3–2	36–10
May 4	South Florida	Mark Light Field • Coral Gables, Florida	9–5	37–10
May 5	South Florida	Mark Light Field • Coral Gables, Florida	4–10	37–11
May 8	Florida Atlantic	Mark Light Field • Coral Gables, Florida	10–2	38–11
May 10	at Jacksonville	John Sessions Stadium • Jacksonville, Florida	9–1	39–11
May 11	at Jacksonville	John Sessions Stadium • Jacksonville, Florida	15–5	40–11
May 12	at Jacksonville	John Sessions Stadium • Jacksonville, Florida	16–2	41–11
May 16	Cal State Fullerton	Mark Light Field • Coral Gables, Florida	5–4	42–11
May 17	Cal State Fullerton	Mark Light Field • Coral Gables, Florida	8–7	43–11
May 18	Cal State Fullerton	Mark Light Field • Coral Gables, Florida	6–7	43–12

Postseason (7–2)
Central I Regional (4–1)

Date	Opponent	Site/stadium	Score	Overall Record
May 23	vs Sam Houston State	UFCU Disch–Falk Field • Austin, Texas	4–5	43–13
May 24	vs Long Beach State	UFCU Disch–Falk Field • Austin, Texas	5–2	44–13
May 25	at Texas	UFCU Disch–Falk Field • Austin, Texas	9–7	45–13
May 26	vs Missouri State	UFCU Disch–Falk Field • Austin, Texas	8–2	46–13
May 26	vs UCLA	UFCU Disch–Falk Field • Austin, Texas	8–4	47–13

1996 College World Series (3–1)

Date	Opponent	Site/stadium	Score	Overall Record
May 31	vs Clemson	Johnny Rosenblatt Stadium • Omaha, Nebraska	7–3	48–13
June 2	vs Alabama	Johnny Rosenblatt Stadium • Omaha, Nebraska	15–1	49–13
June 5	vs Clemson	Johnny Rosenblatt Stadium • Omaha, Nebraska	14–5	50–13
June 8	vs LSU	Johnny Rosenblatt Stadium • Omaha, Nebraska	8–9	50–14

Schedule Source:

== Awards and honors ==
Rudy Gomez

- All Tournament Team

Pat Burrell

- College World Series Most Outstanding Player
- All Tournament Team
- American Baseball Coaches Association All-American
- Baseball America Freshman of the Year

Alex Cora

- All Tournament Team

Michael DeCelle

- All Tournament Team

J. D. Arteaga

- All Tournament Team

Robbie Morrison

Collegiate Baseball All-American

== Hurricanes in the 1996 MLB draft ==
The following members of the Miami Hurricanes baseball program were drafted in the 1996 Major League Baseball draft.

Round	Pick	Player	Position	MLB Club
3	88	Alex Cora	SS	Los Angeles Dodgers
6	158	Jim Gargiulo	C	St. Louis Cardinals
9	274	Denis Pujals	P	Tampa Bay Devil Rays
10	299	Rudy Gomez	2B	New York Yankees
17	503	John Kertis	P	Texas Rangers
17	514	Mike DeCelle	OF	Tampa Bay Devil Rays
18	537	Allen Westfall	P	Seattle Mariners
28	825	T. R. Marcinczyk	1B	Oakland Athletics
37	1,088	Clint Weibl	P	St. Louis Cardinals
43	1,272	Eddie Rivero	OF	Philadelphia Phillies
43	1,273	Kenard Lang	1B	Chicago White Sox
45	1,320	Tris Moore	OF	Detroit Tigers
54	1,516	J. D. Arteaga	P	Pittsburgh Pirates
57	1,570	Juan Galban	P	Atlanta Braves
60	1,596	Ryan Grimmett	OF	Seattle Mariners
