= 1996 NCAA Division I baseball rankings =

1996 NCAA Division I baseball season

Tournament

College World Series
- Champions: LSU
- Runners-up: Miami (FL)
- MOP: Pat Burrell (Miami (FL))

Seasons
- ← 1995 1997 →

The following polls make up the 1996 NCAA Division I baseball rankings. USA Today and ESPN began publishing the Coaches' Poll of 31 active coaches ranking the top 25 teams in the nation in 1992. Each coach is a member of the American Baseball Coaches Association. Baseball America began publishing its poll of the top 20 teams in college baseball in 1981. Beginning with the 1985 season, it expanded to the top 25. Collegiate Baseball Newspaper published its first human poll of the top 20 teams in college baseball in 1957, and expanded to rank the top 30 teams in 1961.

== USA Today/ESPN Coaches' Poll ==
Currently, only the final poll from the 1996 season is available.

Rank	Team
1	LSU
2	Miami (FL)
3	Florida
4	Clemson
5	Florida State
6	Alabama
7	Wichita State
8	Oklahoma State
9	Southern California
10	Cal State Northridge
11	Cal State Fullerton
12	Texas Tech
13	Tennessee
14	Stanford
15	Rice
16	UCLA
17	Virginia
18	South Florida
19	Texas
20	Georgia Tech
21	Georgia Southern
22	UNLV
23	UMass
24	Mississippi State
25	South Alabama

== Baseball America ==
Currently, only the final poll from the 1996 season is available.

Rank	Team
1	LSU
2	Miami (FL)
3	Florida
4	Alabama
5	Clemson
6	Florida State
7	Southern California
8	Wichita State
9	Stanford
10	Cal State Northridge
11	Oklahoma State
12	Cal State Fullerton
13	Tennessee
14	Virginia
15	Texas Tech
16	South Florida
17	Rice
18	Texas
19	UMass
20	Tulane
21	UCLA
22	Georgia Tech
23	UNLV
24	Georgia Southern
25	Arizona State

== Collegiate Baseball ==
Currently, only the final poll from the 1996 season is available.

Rank	Team
1	LSU
2	Miami (FL)
3	Florida
4	Clemson
5	Alabama
6	Florida State
7	Wichita State
8	Oklahoma State
9	Southern California
10	Cal State Northridge
11	Stanford
12	Tennessee
13	Cal State Fullerton
14	Georgia Southern
15	UCLA
16	Texas
17	Texas Tech
18	Georgia Tech
19	Virginia
20	UMass
21	South Florida
22	Stetson
23	South Alabama
24	Tulane
25	Rice
26	UNLV
27	Mississippi State
28	NC State
29	Missouri
30	New Orleans
