= Jeremy Witten (baseball) =

American baseball player (born 1977)

- Left fielder
- Born: August 14, 1977 (age 49); Louisville, Kentucky, U.S.
- Bats: Switch Throws: Right

Jeremy Witten (born August 14, 1977) is a retired left fielder who played for the Louisiana State Tigers in the 1990s and 2000s.

== Early life ==
In 1996, the Baton Rouge Advocate reported that "Jeremy Witten is from Louisville." Although best known today for playing baseball, Witten began his athletic career as an American football punter. In January 1995, the Louisiana Advocate reported that "Jeremy Witten, a punter from Louisville, KY... also plans to play baseball."

The Advocate subsequently quoted Witten saying "Since I've been real small, I've always wanted to play for one of the best programs there is in baseball... They had the right combination I was looking for. I felt real comfortable with the football coaching staff. In October 1997, the Advocate reported that Witten had "kicked a career-best 53-yarder in last week's 36–21 loss to Ole Miss."

== Career ==
During his time with the LSU Tigers, Witten was a part of three baseball National Championships. The Tigers won the College World Series in 1996, 1997, and 2000.

== Personal life ==
Witten lives in Chattanooga with his family. In a 2023 interview on WALV-FM, Witten described Paul Skenes as "the best college pitcher he's ever seen," although he continues to cheer for the Louisiana State Tigers.

== See also ==
- 1996 LSU Tigers baseball team
- 2000 LSU Tigers baseball team
