= 1996 Atlantic Coast Conference baseball tournament =

American college baseball tournament

- Teams: 9
- Format: Play-in round followed by eight-team double elimination
- Finals site: Durham Bulls Athletic Park; Durham, North Carolina
- Champions: Virginia (1st title)
- Winning coach: Dennis Womack (1st title)
- MVP: Seth Greisinger (Virginia)
- Attendance: 22,145

1996 Atlantic Coast Conference baseball standings
	Conf.				Overall
Team	W		L	PCT	W		L	PCT
No. 6 Florida State ‍†‍‍^{y}	19	–	5	.792	52	–	17	.754
No. 4 Clemson ‍‍‍^{y}	17	–	7	.708	51	–	17	.750
No. 18 Georgia Tech ‍‍‍^{y}	13	–	11	.542	40	–	24	.625
No. 28 NC State ‍‍‍^{y}	13	–	11	.542	42	–	19	.689
No. 19 Virginia ‍‍‡‍^{y}	11	–	13	.458	44	–	21	.677
North Carolina ‍‍‍	11	–	13	.458	33	–	25	.569
Duke ‍‍‍	9	–	14	.391	39	–	18	.684
Wake Forest ‍‍‍	7	–	16	.304	26	–	32	.448
Maryland ‍‍‍	7	–	17	.292	24	–	27	.471
† – Conference champion ‡ – Tournament champion y – Invited to the NCAA tournament As of June 30, 1996; Rankings from Collegiate Baseball

The 1996 Atlantic Coast Conference baseball tournament was held at the Durham Bulls Athletic Park in Durham, North Carolina, from May 13 through 17. Due to rain, some games were played at Boshamer Stadium in Chapel Hill, North Carolina. Virginia won the tournament and earned the Atlantic Coast Conference's automatic bid to the 1996 NCAA Division I baseball tournament.

== Tournament ==
=== Play-in game ===
- The two teams with the worst records in regular season conference play faced each other in a single elimination situation to earn the 8th spot in the conference tournament.

Play-in game
9	Maryland	2
8	Wake Forest	3

=== Main Bracket ===
==== Seeding Procedure ====
From TheACC.com:

On Saturday (The Semifinals) of the ACC Baseball Tournament, the match-up between the four remaining teams is determined by previous opponents. If teams have played previously in the tournament, every attempt will be made to avoid a repeat match-up between teams, regardless of seed. If it is impossible to avoid a match-up that already occurred, then the determination is based on avoiding the most recent, current tournament match-up, regardless of seed. If no match-ups have occurred, the team left in the winners bracket will play the lowest seeded team from the losers bracket.

==== Bracket ====
Upper round 1
8	Wake Forest	4
1	Florida State	8
5	Virginia	5
4	NC State	1
6	North Carolina	9
3	Georgia Tech	13
7	Duke	1
2	Clemson	6

Upper round 2
1	Florida State	2
5	Virginia	3
3	Georgia Tech	1
2	Clemson	6
Lower round 1
4	NC State	7
8	Wake Forest	5
7	Duke	13
6	North Carolina	3

Upper final
2	Clemson	2
5	Virginia	4
Lower round 2
4	NC State	1
3	Georgia Tech	6
1	Florida State	7
7	Duke	3

Semifinals
3	Georgia Tech	4
5	Virginia	8
2	Clemson	1
1	Florida State	8

Final
5	Virginia	2	12
1	Florida State	8	1

== All-Tournament Team ==
Position	Player	School
1B	Jason Embler	Clemson
2B	Doug Livingston	Clemson
3B	Brian Sherlock	Virginia
SS	Adam Robinson	Virginia
C	Tucker Barr	Georgia Tech
OF	J. D. Drew	Florida State
OF	John Galloway	Virginia
OF	Symmion Willis	Virginia
DH	E.J. Anderson	Virginia
P	Seth Greisinger	Virginia
P	Scooby Morgan	Florida State
MVP	Seth Greisinger	Virginia

== See also ==
- College World Series
- NCAA Division I Baseball Championship
