= 1996 ACC tournament =

1996 ACC tournament may refer to:

- 1996 ACC men's basketball tournament
- 1996 ACC women's basketball tournament
- 1996 ACC men's soccer tournament
- 1996 ACC women's soccer tournament
- 1996 Atlantic Coast Conference baseball tournament
- 1996 Atlantic Coast Conference softball tournament
