= 1996 Oklahoma State Cowboys baseball team =

American college baseball season

1996 Oklahoma State Cowboys baseball

Big Eight Tournament champions Central II Regional champions

College World Series, T-7th
- Conference: Big Eight Conference

Ranking
- Coaches: No. 8
- CB: No. 8
- Record: 45–21 (17–9 Big 8)
- Head coach: Gary Ward (19th season)
- Pitching coach: Tom Holliday (19th season)
- Home stadium: Allie P. Reynolds Stadium

1996 Big Eight Conference baseball standings
	Conf.				Overall
Team	W		L	PCT	W		L	PCT
No. 29 Missouri ‍†‍‍^{y}	20	–	8	.714	39	–	19	.672
No. 8 Oklahoma State ‍‍‡‍^{y}	17	–	9	.654	45	–	21	.682
Oklahoma ‍‍‍	14	–	12	.538	32	–	25	.561
Iowa State ‍‍‍	12	–	14	.462	23	–	31	.426
Kansas State ‍‍‍	11	–	16	.407	28	–	26	.519
Kansas ‍‍‍	11	–	17	.393	26	–	30	.464
Nebraska ‍‍‍	8	–	17	.320	27	–	27	.500
† – Conference champion ‡ – Tournament champion y – Invited to the NCAA tournament As of June 30, 1996; Rankings from Collegiate Baseball

The 1996 Oklahoma State Cowboys baseball team represented the Oklahoma State University–Stillwater in the 1996 NCAA Division I baseball season. The Cowboys played their home games at Allie P. Reynolds Stadium. The team was coached by Gary Ward in his 19th year at Oklahoma State.

The Cowboys won the Central II Regional to advance to the College World Series, where they were defeated by the Clemson Tigers.

== Roster ==
1996 Oklahoma State Cowboys baseball team
Players
Coaches

#	Pos.	Name	B/T	Height	Weight	Year	Home town
	RHP	Jon Adkins	L/R	6 ft 0 in (1.83 m)	200 lb (91 kg)	Fr	Wayne, West Virginia
	RHP	Heath Askew	/R	—	—	Jr
	OF	Brian Aylor	L/L	6 ft 2 in (1.88 m)	200 lb (91 kg)		Oklahoma City, Oklahoma
	P	Dan Brown	/	—	—
		Cory Burton	/	—	—
		Jamie Cook	/	—	—
	RHP	Ryan Cunneen	R/R	6 ft 3 in (1.91 m)	225 lb (102 kg)
		Dan DiPace	L/R	6 ft 2 in (1.88 m)	215 lb (98 kg)	Jr
	RHP	Thom Dreier	R/R	6 ft 4 in (1.93 m)	235 lb (107 kg)	Fr	Union, Missouri
	C	Ryan Folmar	L/R	5 ft 11 in (1.8 m)	205 lb (93 kg)	Jr	Chambersburg, Pennsylvania
	RHP	Neil Forsythe	R/R	6 ft 5 in (1.96 m)	250 lb (113 kg)
	OF	Jeff Guiel	L/R	5 ft 11 in (1.8 m)	195 lb (88 kg)	Jr	Vancouver, British Columbia
		Steve Goeke	/	—	—
	LHP	Ryan Graves	L/L	6 ft 2 in (1.88 m)	185 lb (84 kg)	Sr
	INF	Steve Hartsburg	R/R	6 ft 2 in (1.88 m)	205 lb (93 kg)		Schaumburg, Illinois
	LHP	Micah Hesting	L/L	6 ft 1 in (1.85 m)	175 lb (79 kg)
		Josh Holliday	S/R	5 ft 11 in (1.8 m)	195 lb (88 kg)	Fr	Stillwater, Oklahoma
	OF	Dean Kent	/	—	—	Sr	Tampa, Florida
	P	Shane Kirby	/	—	—
	INF	Tripp MacKay	S/R	5 ft 10 in (1.78 m)	170 lb (77 kg)		Mount Pleasant, Texas
	LHP	Dave Maurer	R/L	6 ft 2 in (1.88 m)	205 lb (93 kg)		Minneapolis, Minnesota
	RHP	Sean McClellan	R/R	6 ft 2 in (1.88 m)	215 lb (98 kg)		Seminole, Florida
		Jay McCullough	/	—	—
	OF	Rusty McNamara	R/R	5 ft 9 in (1.75 m)	200 lb (91 kg)	So	Riverside, California
	RHP	Elvin Nina	R/R	6 ft 0 in (1.83 m)	180 lb (82 kg)		East Orange, New Jersey
		Tony Roossien	/	—	—
19	OF	Ted Salhani	L/R	6 ft 2 in (1.88 m)	210 lb (95 kg)	So	London, Ontario, Canada
	P	Cory Smith	/	—	—
	P	Larry Smith	/	—	—
	INF	Wyley Steelmon	L/R	6 ft 3 in (1.91 m)	225 lb (102 kg)		Enid, Oklahoma
	P	Brian Thomas	/	—	—
		Buddy White	/	—	—
29	INF	Jamey Wood	R/R	6 ft 4 in (1.93 m)	215 lb (98 kg)	Jr	San Jose, CA

Head coach

20 Gary Ward

Assistant coach(es)

Wade Robertson

Pitching coach(es)

Tom Holliday

Legend

- (C) Team captain
- (S) Suspended
- (I) Ineligible
- Injured
- Current redshirt

Roster
Last update: March 25, 2021

== Schedule ==
1996 Oklahoma State Cowboys baseball game log
Regular season
February (6–3)

#	Date	Opponent	Site/stadium	Score	Overall record	Big 8 record
1	February 9	vs Loyola Marymount	Brazell Field • Phoenix, Arizona	20–10	1–0	–
2	February 10	vs New Mexico State	Brazell Field • Phoenix, Arizona	6–7	1–1	–
3	February 11	at Grand Canyon	Brazell Field • Phoenix, Arizona	22–16	2–1	–
4	February 16	vs The Citadel	Alfred A. McKethan Stadium • Gainesville, Florida	12–4	3–1	–
5	February 17	vs Southern California	Alfred A. McKethan Stadium • Gainesville, Florida	5–6	3–2	–
6	February 18	at Florida	Alfred A. McKethan Stadium • Gainesville, Florida	4–5	3–3	–
7	February 23	West Virginia	Allie P. Reynolds Stadium • Stillwater, Oklahoma	15–8	4–3	–
8	February 24	West Virginia	Allie P. Reynolds Stadium • Stillwater, Oklahoma	13–2	5–3	–
9	February 25	West Virginia	Allie P. Reynolds Stadium • Stillwater, Oklahoma	16–4	6–3	–

March (15–4)

#	Date	Opponent	Site/stadium	Score	Overall record	Big 8 record
10	March 1	vs Lamar	Reckling Park • Houston, Texas	2–3	6–4	–
11	March 2	at Rice	Reckling Park • Houston, Texas	7–5	7–4	–
12	March 3	vs Southwestern Louisiana	Reckling Park • Houston, Texas	7–4	8–4	–
13	March 5	vs Maine	Reckling Park • Houston, Texas	5–3	9–4	–
14	March 6	vs Texas Southern	Reckling Park • Houston, Texas	16–6	10–4	–
15	March 7	vs Southwestern Louisiana	Reckling Park • Houston, Texas	21–11	11–4	–
16	March 9	at TCU	TCU Diamond • Fort Worth, Texas	13–8	12–4	–
17	March 10	TCU	Allie P. Reynolds Stadium • Stillwater, Oklahoma	5–10	12–5	–
18	March 11	Iowa State	Allie P. Reynolds Stadium • Stillwater, Oklahoma	14–9	13–5	1–0
19	March 12	Iowa State	Allie P. Reynolds Stadium • Stillwater, Oklahoma	18–3	14–5	2–0
20	March 13	Iowa State	Allie P. Reynolds Stadium • Stillwater, Oklahoma	14–8	15–5	3–0
21	March 16	Missouri	Allie P. Reynolds Stadium • Stillwater, Oklahoma	25–16	16–5	4–0
22	March 17	Missouri	Allie P. Reynolds Stadium • Stillwater, Oklahoma	12–10	17–5	5–0
23	March 20	Kansas State	Allie P. Reynolds Stadium • Stillwater, Oklahoma	0–8	17–6	5–1
24	March 20	Kansas State	Allie P. Reynolds Stadium • Stillwater, Oklahoma	7–6	18–6	6–1
25	March 22	Washington	Allie P. Reynolds Stadium • Stillwater, Oklahoma	11–7	19–6	6–1
26	March 23	Washington	Allie P. Reynolds Stadium • Stillwater, Oklahoma	11–15	19–7	6–1
27	March 23	Washington	Allie P. Reynolds Stadium • Stillwater, Oklahoma	11–2	20–7	6–1
28	March 29	at Nebraska	Buck Beltzer Stadium • Lincoln, Nebraska	18–8	21–7	7–1

April (8–11)

#	Date	Opponent	Site/stadium	Score	Overall record	Big 8 record
29	April 2	at Kansas	Hoglund Ballpark • Lawrence, Kansas	3–5	21–8	7–2
30	April 3	at Kansas	Hoglund Ballpark • Lawrence, Kansas	13–19	21–9	7–3
31	April 6	Kansas	Allie P. Reynolds Stadium • Stillwater, Oklahoma	11–9	22–9	8–3
32	April 6	Kansas	Allie P. Reynolds Stadium • Stillwater, Oklahoma	10–9	23–9	9–3
33	April 7	Kansas	Allie P. Reynolds Stadium • Stillwater, Oklahoma	21–1	24–9	10–3
34	April 10	at Iowa State	Cap Timm Field • Ames, Iowa	2–6	24–10	10–4
35	April 10	at Iowa State	Cap Timm Field • Ames, Iowa	4–8	24–11	10–5
36	April 12	vs Oklahoma	Drillers Stadium • Tulsa, Oklahoma	5–7	24–12	10–6
37	April 13	vs Oklahoma	All Sports Stadium • Oklahoma City, Oklahoma	7–1	25–12	11–6
38	April 14	vs Oklahoma	All Sports Stadium • Oklahoma City, Oklahoma	7–1	26–12	12–6
39	April 16	at Oklahoma	L. Dale Mitchell Baseball Park • Norman, Oklahoma	14–4	27–12	13–6
40	April 17	Oklahoma	Allie P. Reynolds Stadium • Stillwater, Oklahoma	12–11	28–12	14–6
41	April 19	at Missouri	Simmons Field • Columbia, Missouri	23–24	28–13	14–7
42	April 20	at Missouri	Allie P. Reynolds Stadium • Stillwater, Oklahoma	9–12	28–14	14–8
43	April 21	at Missouri	Allie P. Reynolds Stadium • Stillwater, Oklahoma	5–6	28–15	14–9
44	April 23	Wichita State	Allie P. Reynolds Stadium • Stillwater, Oklahoma	3–7	28–16	14–9
45	April 24	at Wichita State	Eck Stadium • Wichita, Kansas	4–19	28–17	14–9
46	April 26	at Oral Roberts	J. L. Johnson Stadium • Tulsa, Oklahoma	2–7	28–18	14–9
47	April 27	Oral Roberts	Allie P. Reynolds Stadium • Stillwater, Oklahoma	11–4	29–18	14–9

May (8–1)

#	Date	Opponent	Site/stadium	Score	Overall record	Big 8 record
48	May 5	Missouri Southern	Allie P. Reynolds Stadium • Stillwater, Oklahoma	17–2	30–18	14–9
49	May 6	Missouri Southern	Allie P. Reynolds Stadium • Stillwater, Oklahoma	3–4	30–19	14–9
50	May 7	Chicago State	Allie P. Reynolds Stadium • Stillwater, Oklahoma	21–1	31–19	14–9
51	May 8	Chicago State	Allie P. Reynolds Stadium • Stillwater, Oklahoma	15–5	32–19	14–9
52	May 9	Chicago State	Allie P. Reynolds Stadium • Stillwater, Oklahoma	22–19	33–19	14–9
53	May 11	Kansas State	Allie P. Reynolds Stadium • Stillwater, Oklahoma	10–6	34–19	15–9
54	May 11	Kansas State	Allie P. Reynolds Stadium • Stillwater, Oklahoma	15–6	35–19	16–9
55	May 12	Kansas State	Allie P. Reynolds Stadium • Stillwater, Oklahoma	26–5	36–19	17–9
56	May 13	Rice	Allie P. Reynolds Stadium • Stillwater, Oklahoma	6–5	37–19	17–9

Postseason
Big Eight Conference Tournament (4–0)

#	Date	Opponent	Site/stadium	Score	Overall record	Big 8 record
57	May 16	vs Kansas State	All Sports Stadium • Oklahoma City, Oklahoma	10–4	38–19	17–9
58	May 17	vs Oklahoma	All Sports Stadium • Oklahoma City, Oklahoma	16–11	39–19	17–9
59	May 18	vs Missouri	All Sports Stadium • Oklahoma City, Oklahoma	18–12	40–19	17–9
60	May 19	vs Iowa State	All Sports Stadium • Oklahoma City, Oklahoma	15–11	41–19	17–9

NCAA Central II Regional (4–0)

#	Date	Opponent	Site/stadium	Score	Overall record	Big 8 record
60	May 23	vs Arkansas	Dan Law Field • Lubbock, Texas	6–5	42–19	17–9
61	May 24	vs Fresno State	Dan Law Field • Lubbock, Texas	12–5	43–19	17–9
62	May 25	vs Southern California	Dan Law Field • Lubbock, Texas	9–3	44–19	17–9
63	May 26	vs Southern California	Dan Law Field • Lubbock, Texas	10–2	45–19	17–9

College World Series (0–2)

#	Date	Opponent	Site/stadium	Score	Overall record	Big 8 record
64	May 31	vs Alabama	Johnny Rosenblatt Stadium • Omaha, Nebraska	5–7	45–20	17–9
65	June 2	vs Clemson	Johnny Rosenblatt Stadium • Omaha, Nebraska	5–8	45–21	17–9

== Awards and honors ==
Brian Aylor

- Big Eight Conference All-Tournament Team

Danny DiPace

- Big Eight Conference All-Tournament Team

Neil Forsythe

- Big Eight Conference All-Tournament Team

Ryan Graves

- Big Eight Conference All-Tournament Team

Jeff Guiel

- All-Big Eight Conference
- First Team All-American American Baseball Coaches Association
- Third Team All-American Baseball America
- First Team All-American Collegiate Baseball
- Second Team All-American National Collegiate Baseball Writers Association

Sean McClellan

- All-Big Eight Conference

Rusty McNamara

- All-Big Eight Conference
- Big Eight Conference All-Tournament Team

Wyley Steelmon

- All-Big Eight Conference
