= 1996 LSU Tigers baseball team =

American college baseball season

1996 LSU Tigers baseball

National Champions SEC Champions
- Conference: Southeastern Conference
- Western Division
- Record: 52-15 (20-10 SEC)
- Head coach: Skip Bertman
- Home stadium: Alex Box Stadium

1996 Southeastern Conference baseball standings
	Conf.				Overall
Team	W		L	PCT	W		L	PCT
Eastern Division
No. 3 Florida ^{x}‍†‍‍	20	–	10	.667	50	–	18	.735
No. 12 Tennessee ‍‍‍	18	–	12	.600	43	–	20	.683
Kentucky ‍‍‍	15	–	14	.517	35	–	24	.593
Vanderbilt ‍‍‍	14	–	16	.467	29	–	25	.537
South Carolina ‍‍‍	13	–	17	.433	25	–	28	.472
Georgia ‍‍‍	8	–	21	.276	24	–	30	.444
Western Division
No. 5 Alabama ^{x}‍†‍‡‍	20	–	10	.667	50	–	19	.725
No. 1 LSU ^{x}‍†‍‍	20	–	10	.667	52	–	15	.776
No. 27 Mississippi State ‍‍‍	17	–	13	.567	38	–	24	.613
Arkansas ‍‍‍	15	–	15	.500	39	–	20	.661
Auburn ‍‍‍	12	–	18	.400	32	–	24	.571
Ole Miss ‍‍‍	7	–	23	.233	24	–	30	.444
x – Division champion † – Conference champion ‡ – Tournament champion y – Invited to the NCAA tournament As of June 30, 1996; Rankings from Collegiate Baseball

The 1996 LSU Tigers baseball team won the NCAA national championship in College World Series.

The Tigers, coached by Skip Bertman, had already established themselves as a premier college baseball program, having won two previous national championships in 1991 and 1993. The 1996 version built on this reputation by compiling a 52–15 record, including going 20–10 in the Southeastern Conference, winning the SEC championship as well.

== Regular season ==
The Tigers regular season record was 43–13 with notable losses coming against conference rivals Alabama and a 3-game sweep at the hands of Florida.

== SEC tournament ==
LSU defeated Tennessee in the first game of the 1996 SEC baseball tournament but then lost to Florida (their fourth loss to them in as many games) and Kentucky and were eliminated.

== NCAA Tournament Regional ==
LSU cruised through the regional round (hosted by LSU at Alex Box Stadium) of the NCAA Tournament defeating Austin Peay 9-3, UNLV 7-6, UNO 17–4 and Georgia Tech 29-13.

== College World Series ==
The Tigers opened the College World Series by defeating Wichita State 9-8, the same team they beat in the championship games of 1991 and 1993. LSU then moved on to play conference rival Florida (who had beaten the Tigers in all four games played earlier in the season). LSU won 9-4. Florida then came back through the losers bracket to face LSU again. The Tigers won the second game 2–1 to move onto the championship game.

The championship game featured a match-up of two college baseball powers in LSU and Miami (Florida). Both teams had previously won 2 national championships (Miami: 1982 & 1985) and were vying for their third. Miami featured future major leaguers Alex Cora and Pat Burrell, who helped the Hurricanes to establish a 7–3 lead in the game. However, the Tigers would fight back to tie the game. Cora then reclaimed the lead for Miami with an RBI single and the Hurricanes then led 8–7 heading into the 9th inning.

With 2 outs and a runner on third base LSU only needed a base hit or a wild pitch to tie the game. An unlikely hero emerged from the LSU dugout in Warren Morris, who had been hurt most of the year. He stepped to the plate and faced pitcher Robbie Morrison. Morris swung on Morrison's first pitch and lined the ball just inches over the right field fence for a 2 out, game winning walk off home run. This was his first home run of the season.

== Aftermath ==
Morris' home run would later win the 1997 Showstopper of the Year ESPY Award.

The Tigers won their third national championship and would follow it up with five more in 1997, 2000, 2009, 2023, and 2025. Miami would recover go on to win two more national championships as well in 1999 and 2001.

== Schedule/Results ==
1996 LSU Tigers baseball game log

Regular Season
#	Date	Opponent	Site/stadium	Score	Win	Loss	Save	Attendance	Overall record	SEC record
1	-	Western Kentucky	Alex Box Stadium	9–0	-	-	-	-	1–0	-
2	-	Western Kentucky	Alex Box Stadium	18–0	-	-	-	-	2–0	-
3	-	Western Kentucky	Alex Box Stadium	18–1	-	-	-	-	3–0	-
4	-	Centenary	Alex Box Stadium	6–1	-	-	-	-	4–0	-
5	-	Southern Mississippi	Winn-Dixie Showdown (New Orleans, LA)	7–4	-	-	-	-	5–0	-
6	-	Ole Miss	Winn-Dixie Showdown (New Orleans, LA)	9–7	-	-	-	-	6–0	-
7	-	Mississippi State	Winn-Dixie Showdown (New Orleans, LA)	8–4	-	-	-	-	7–0	-
8	-	Tulane	Alex Box Stadium	10–0	-	-	-	-	8–0	-
9	-	Louisiana Tech	Alex Box Stadium	6–1	-	-	-	-	9–0	-
10	-	Duquesne	Alex Box Stadium	14–7	-	-	-	-	10–0	-
11	-	Duquesne	Alex Box Stadium	9–5	-	-	-	-	11–0	-
12	-	Loyola-New Orleans	Alex Box Stadium	22–2	-	-	-	-	12–0	-
13	-	Vanderbilt	Hawkins Field	15–0	-	-	-	-	13–0	1–0
14	-	Vanderbilt	Hawkins Field	2–3	-	-	-	-	13–1	1–1
15	-	Vanderbilt	Hawkins Field	14–4	-	-	-	-	14–1	2–1
16	-	Dayton	Alex Box Stadium	15–2	-	-	-	-	15–1	-
17	-	Dayton	Alex Box Stadium	6–7	-	-	-	-	15–2	-
18	-	Georgia	Alex Box Stadium	14–4	-	-	-	-	16–2	3–1
19	-	Georgia	Alex Box Stadium	12–5	-	-	-	-	17–2	4–1
20	-	Georgia	Alex Box Stadium	23–5	-	-	-	-	18–2	5–1
21	-	UNO	Alex Box Stadium	16–8	-	-	-	-	19–2	-
22	-	Northeast Louisiana	Alex Box Stadium	10–0	-	-	-	-	20–2	-
23	-	Florida	McKethan Stadium	6–7	-	-	-	-	20–3	5–2
24	-	Florida	McKethan Stadium	5–9	-	-	-	-	20–4	5–3
25	-	Florida	McKethan Stadium	1–2	-	-	-	-	20–5	5–4
26	-	Southern	Alex Box Stadium	19–0	-	-	-	-	21–5	-
27	-	McNeese State	Alex Box Stadium	16–0	-	-	-	-	22–5	-
28	-	Tennessee	Alex Box Stadium	9–2	-	-	-	-	23–5	6–4
29	-	Tennessee	Alex Box Stadium	5–3	-	-	-	-	24–5	7–4
30	-	Tennessee	Alex Box Stadium	9–1	-	-	-	-	25–5	8–4
31	-	Tulane	Greer Field at Turchin Stadium	3–1	-	-	-	-	26–5	-
32	-	Northwestern Louisiana	Alex Box Stadium	5–10	-	-	-	-	26–6	-
33	-	Northwestern Louisiana	Alex Box Stadium	5–6	-	-	-	-	26–7	-
34	-	South Carolina	Carolina Stadium	15–2	-	-	-	-	27–7	9–4
35	-	South Carolina	Carolina Stadium	0–2	-	-	-	-	27–8	9–5
36	-	South Carolina	Carolina Stadium	4–2	-	-	-	-	28–8	10–5
37	-	Southeastern Louisiana	Alumni Field	5–2	-	-	-	-	29–8	-
38	-	Nicholls State	Alex Box Stadium	14–0	-	-	-	-	30–8	-
39	-	Ole Miss	Oxford-University Stadium at Swayze Field	6–5	-	-	-	-	31–8	11–5
40	-	Ole Miss	Oxford-University Stadium at Swayze Field	10–1	-	-	-	-	32–8	12–5
41	-	Ole Miss	Oxford-University Stadium at Swayze Field	9–2	-	-	-	-	33–8	13–5
42	-	Southeastern Louisiana	Alex Box Stadium	7–4	-	-	-	-	34–8	-
43	-	Arkansas	Alex Box Stadium	2–3	-	-	-	-	34–9	13–6
44	-	Arkansas	Alex Box Stadium	11–4	-	-	-	-	35–9	14–6
45	-	Arkansas	Alex Box Stadium	9–4	-	-	-	-	36–9	15–6
46	-	University of New Orleans	Maestri Field	8–4	-	-	-	-	37–9	-
47	-	Louisiana College	Alex Box Stadium	20–0	-	-	-	-	38–9	-
48	-	Alabama	Alex Box Stadium	8–6	-	-	-	-	39–9	16–6
49	-	Alabama	Alex Box Stadium	4–17	-	-	-	-	39–10	16–7
50	-	Alabama	Alex Box Stadium	5–12	-	-	-	-	39–11	16–8
51	-	Auburn	Samford Stadium – Hitchcock Field at Plainsman Park	14–2	-	-	-	-	40–11	17–8
52	-	Auburn	Samford Stadium – Hitchcock Field at Plainsman Park	6–0	-	-	-	-	41–11	18–8
53	-	Auburn	Samford Stadium – Hitchcock Field at Plainsman Park	3–7	-	-	-	-	41–12	18–9
54	-	Mississippi State	Alex Box Stadium	8–7	-	-	-	-	42–12	19–9
55	-	Mississippi State	Alex Box Stadium	17–9	-	-	-	-	43–12	20–9
56	-	Mississippi State	Alex Box Stadium	10–11	-	-	-	-	43–13	20–10

Post-Season

SEC Tournament
#	Date	Opponent	Site/stadium	Score	Win	Loss	Save	Attendance	Overall record	SECT Record
57	-	Tennessee	Regions Park	3–1	-	-	-	-	44–13	1-0
58	-	Florida	Regions Park	2–6	-	-	-	-	44–14	1-1
59	-	Kentucky	Regions Park	11–12	-	-	-	-	44–15	1-2

NCAA South II Regional (Baton Rouge, LA)
#	Date	Opponent	Site/stadium	Score	Win	Loss	Save	Attendance	Overall record	NCAAT Record
60	May 23	Austin Peay	Alex Box Stadium	9–3	-	-	-	-	45–15	1-0
61	May 24	UNLV	Alex Box Stadium	7–6	-	-	-	-	46–15	2-0
62	May 25	University of New Orleans	Alex Box Stadium	17–4	-	-	-	-	47–15	3-0
63	May 26	Georgia Tech	Alex Box Stadium	29–13	-	-	-	-	48–15	4-0

College World Series
#	Date	Opponent	Site/stadium	Score	Win	Loss	Save	Attendance	Overall record	NCAAT Record
64	June 1	Wichita State	Rosenblatt Stadium	9–8	-	-	-	-	49–15	1-0
65	June 3	Florida	Rosenblatt Stadium	9–4	-	-	-	-	50–15	2-0
66	June 6	Florida	Rosenblatt Stadium	2–1	-	-	-	-	51–15	3-0
67	June 8	Miami (Florida)	Rosenblatt Stadium	9–8	-	-	-	-	52–15	4-0

== Roster ==
=== Coaches ===
Name	Position
Skip Bertman	Head coach
Mike Bianco	Assistant coach
Dan Canevari	Administrative Assistant
Daniel Tomlin	Volunteer Assistant Coach

=== Players ===
Name	Position
T.J. Arnett	RHP
Tom Bernhardt	OF
Eric Berthelot	LHP
John Blancher	INF
Justin Bowles	RF
Matt Colvin	LHP
Patrick Coogan	RHP
Chad Cooley	LF
Casey Cuntz	INF
Brian Daugherty	RHP
Chris Demouy	LHP
Nathan Dunn	3B
Jake Esteves	RHP
Eddy Furniss	1B
Dan Guillory	RHP
Jeff Harris	RHP
James Hemphill	OF
Conan Horton	C
Sonny Knoll	RHP
Mike Koerner	CF
Tim Lanier	C
Brett Laxton	RHP
Antonio Leonardi-Cattolica	RHP
Trey McClure	INF
Jeramie Moore	1B
Warren Morris	2B
Joey Painich	RHP
Keith Polozola	INF
Kevin Shipp	RHP
Bill Bridges	RHP
Kevin Ward	C
Jason Williams	SS
Brad Wilson	DH
Jeremy Witten	OF
Eddie Yarnall	LHP
