= 1996 Alabama Crimson Tide baseball team =

American college baseball season

1996 Alabama Crimson Tide baseball

SEC regular season champions SEC tournament champions South I Regional champions

College World Series, 4th
- Conference: Southeastern Conference
- Western
- Record: 50–19 (20–10 SEC)
- Head coach: Jim Wells (2nd season)
- Assistant coach: Mitch Gaspard (2nd season)
- Hitting coach: Todd Butler (2nd season)
- Home stadium: Sewell–Thomas Stadium

1996 Southeastern Conference baseball standings
	Conf.				Overall
Team	W		L	PCT	W		L	PCT
Eastern Division
No. 3 Florida ^{x}‍†‍‍	20	–	10	.667	50	–	18	.735
No. 12 Tennessee ‍‍‍	18	–	12	.600	43	–	20	.683
Kentucky ‍‍‍	15	–	14	.517	35	–	24	.593
Vanderbilt ‍‍‍	14	–	16	.467	29	–	25	.537
South Carolina ‍‍‍	13	–	17	.433	25	–	28	.472
Georgia ‍‍‍	8	–	21	.276	24	–	30	.444
Western Division
No. 5 Alabama ^{x}‍†‍‡‍	20	–	10	.667	50	–	19	.725
No. 1 LSU ^{x}‍†‍‍	20	–	10	.667	52	–	15	.776
No. 27 Mississippi State ‍‍‍	17	–	13	.567	38	–	24	.613
Arkansas ‍‍‍	15	–	15	.500	39	–	20	.661
Auburn ‍‍‍	12	–	18	.400	32	–	24	.571
Ole Miss ‍‍‍	7	–	23	.233	24	–	30	.444
x – Division champion † – Conference champion ‡ – Tournament champion y – Invited to the NCAA tournament As of June 30, 1996; Rankings from Collegiate Baseball

The 1996 Alabama Crimson Tide baseball team is a baseball team that represented the University of Alabama in the 1996 NCAA Division I baseball season. The Crimson Tide were members of the Southeastern Conference and played their home games at Sewell–Thomas Stadium in Tuscaloosa, Alabama. They were led by second-year head coach Jim Wells.

== Roster ==
1996 Alabama Crimson Tide baseball team
Players
Coaches

#	Pos.	Name	B/T	Height	Weight	Year	Home town
	RHP	Skip Ames	R/R	6 ft 2 in (1.88 m)	175 lb (79 kg)	Jr	Houston, Texas
	P	Andy Bernard	/	—	—
	INF	Joe Caruso	R/R	5 ft 9 in (1.75 m)	190 lb (86 kg)	Jr	Lock Haven, Pennsylvania
	P	Joel Colgrove	/	—	—
	P	John Collins	/	—	—
	P	Chris Eilers	/	—	—
		Eric Goldis	/	—	—
	OF	Doug Hall	L/L	6 ft 1 in (1.85 m)	190 lb (86 kg)	Jr	Gallatin, Tennessee
	OF	Dustan Mohr	R/R	6 ft 0 in (1.83 m)	210 lb (95 kg)	So	Hattiesburg, Mississippi
	INF	Chris Moller	/	—	—
	INF	Kevin Nichols	R/R	6 ft 0 in (1.83 m)	195 lb (88 kg)		Panama City, Florida
	C	Dax Norris	R/R	5 ft 10 in (1.78 m)	190 lb (86 kg)	RS Sr	La Grange, Georgia
	INF	Andy Phillips	R/R	6 ft 0 in (1.83 m)	205 lb (93 kg)	Fr	Tuscaloosa, Alabama
	LHP	Corey Spiers	L/L	6 ft 0 in (1.83 m)	204 lb (93 kg)	Jr	Joliet, Illinois
	INF	Brett Taft	R/R	5 ft 8 in (1.73 m)	160 lb (73 kg)	Sr	Birmingham, Alabama
	OF	David Tidwell	R/R	5 ft 9 in (1.75 m)	170 lb (77 kg)	Jr	Grenada, Mississippi
	RHP	Manny Torres	/R	—	—	Fr
	RHP	Byron Tribe	R/R	6 ft 3 in (1.91 m)	210 lb (95 kg)	Jr	Houston, Texas
	INF	Robbie Tucker	/	—	—
	LHP	Tim Young	L/L	5 ft 9 in (1.75 m)	170 lb (77 kg)	Sr	Gulfport, Mississippi

Head coach

Jim Wells

Assistant coach(es)

Todd Butler
Mitch Gaspard

Legend

- (C) Team captain
- (S) Suspended
- (I) Ineligible
- Injured
- Current redshirt

== Schedule ==
1996 Alabama Crimson Tide baseball game log
Regular season
February (9–3)

#	Date	Opponent	Site/stadium	Score	Overall record	SEC record
1	February 9	vs Georgia Tech	Osceola County Stadium • Kissimmee, Florida	7–2	1–0	–
2	February 10	vs Wake Forest	Osceola County Stadium • Kissimmee, Florida	10–7	2–0	–
3	February 11	vs North Carolina	Osceola County Stadium • Kissimmee, Florida	6–7	2–1	–
4	February 16	Centenary	Sewell–Thomas Stadium • Tuscaloosa, Alabama	6–5	3–1	–
5	February 17	Centenary	Sewell–Thomas Stadium • Tuscaloosa, Alabama	9–2	4–1	–
6	February 18	Centenary	Sewell–Thomas Stadium • Tuscaloosa, Alabama	6–1	5–1	–
7	February 21	Middle Tennessee	Sewell–Thomas Stadium • Tuscaloosa, Alabama	3–4	5–2	–
8	February 23	at Northeast Louisiana	Warhawk Field • Monroe, Louisiana	8–2	6–2	–
9	February 24	at Northeast Louisiana	Warhawk Field • Monroe, Louisiana	7–1	7–2	–
10	February 25	at Northeast Louisiana	Warhawk Field • Monroe, Louisiana	3–5	7–3	–
11	February 27	Radford	Sewell–Thomas Stadium • Tuscaloosa, Alabama	6–1	8–3	–
12	February 28	Radford	Sewell–Thomas Stadium • Tuscaloosa, Alabama	19–4	9–3	–

March (14–7)

#	Date	Opponent	Site/stadium	Score	Overall record	SEC record
13	March 1	UNC Greensboro	Sewell–Thomas Stadium • Tuscaloosa, Alabama	8–13	9–4	–
14	March 2	UNC Greensboro	Sewell–Thomas Stadium • Tuscaloosa, Alabama	9–3	10–4	–
15	March 3	UNC Greensboro	Sewell–Thomas Stadium • Tuscaloosa, Alabama	12–3	11–4	–
16	March 5	at Samford	Joe Lee Griffin Stadium • Birmingham, Alabama	5–4	12–4	–
17	March 8	at Georgia	Foley Field • Athens, Georgia	1–11	12–5	0–1
18	March 9	at Georgia	Foley Field • Athens, Georgia	9–6	13–5	1–1
19	March 10	at Georgia	Foley Field • Athens, Georgia	6–4	14–5	2–1
20	March 12	Murray State	Sewell–Thomas Stadium • Tuscaloosa, Alabama	3–6	14–6	2–1
21	March 13	Murray State	Sewell–Thomas Stadium • Tuscaloosa, Alabama	9–3	15–6	2–1
22	March 16	Florida	Sewell–Thomas Stadium • Tuscaloosa, Alabama	8–9	15–7	2–2
23	March 16	Florida	Sewell–Thomas Stadium • Tuscaloosa, Alabama	3–2	16–7	3–2
24	March 17	Florida	Sewell–Thomas Stadium • Tuscaloosa, Alabama	8–4	17–7	4–2
25	March 19	Eastern Kentucky	Sewell–Thomas Stadium • Tuscaloosa, Alabama	10–2	18–7	4–2
26	March 20	Eastern Kentucky	Sewell–Thomas Stadium • Tuscaloosa, Alabama	7–8	18–8	4–2
27	March 22	Tennessee	Sewell–Thomas Stadium • Tuscaloosa, Alabama	2–0	19–8	5–2
28	March 23	Tennessee	Sewell–Thomas Stadium • Tuscaloosa, Alabama	2–6	19–9	5–3
29	March 24	Tennessee	Sewell–Thomas Stadium • Tuscaloosa, Alabama	5–4	20–9	6–3
30	March 26	at South Alabama	Eddie Stanky Field • Mobile, Alabama	1–0	21–9	6–3
31	March 29	at Vanderbilt	McGugin Field • Nashville, Tennessee	0–5	21–10	6–4
32	March 30	at Vanderbilt	McGugin Field • Nashville, Tennessee	14–13	22–10	7–4
33	March 31	at Vanderbilt	McGugin Field • Nashville, Tennessee	14–11	23–10	8–4

April (12–5)

#	Date	Opponent	Site/stadium	Score	Overall record	SEC record
34	April 2	Auburn	Paterson Field • Montgomery, Alabama	2–0	24–10	8–4
35	April 5	at Kentucky	Cliff Hagan Stadium • Lexington, Kentucky	17–4	25–10	9–4
36	April 6	at Kentucky	Cliff Hagan Stadium • Lexington, Kentucky	2–3	25–11	9–5
37	April 7	at Kentucky	Cliff Hagan Stadium • Lexington, Kentucky	4–1	26–11	10–5
38	April 10	UAB	Sewell–Thomas Stadium • Tuscaloosa, Alabama	17–6	27–11	10–5
39	April 12	Mississippi State	Sewell–Thomas Stadium • Tuscaloosa, Alabama	3–1	28–11	11–5
40	April 13	Mississippi State	Sewell–Thomas Stadium • Tuscaloosa, Alabama	5–4	29–11	12–5
41	April 13	Mississippi State	Sewell–Thomas Stadium • Tuscaloosa, Alabama	1–5	29–12	12–6
42	April 17	at UAB	Jerry D. Young Memorial Field • Birmingham, Alabama	12–5	30–12	12–6
43	April 19	Ole Miss	Sewell–Thomas Stadium • Tuscaloosa, Alabama	1–3	30–13	12–7
44	April 20	Ole Miss	Sewell–Thomas Stadium • Tuscaloosa, Alabama	3–8	30–14	12–8
45	April 21	Ole Miss	Sewell–Thomas Stadium • Tuscaloosa, Alabama	9–5	31–14	13–8
46	April 22	Birmingham–Southern	Sewell–Thomas Stadium • Tuscaloosa, Alabama	8–2	32–14	13–8
47	April 24	Samford	Sewell–Thomas Stadium • Tuscaloosa, Alabama	8–2	33–14	13–8
48	April 26	at LSU	Alex Box Stadium • Baton Rouge, Louisiana	6–8	33–15	13–9
49	April 27	at LSU	Alex Box Stadium • Baton Rouge, Louisiana	17–4	34–15	14–9
50	April 28	at LSU	Alex Box Stadium • Baton Rouge, Louisiana	12–5	35–15	15–9

May (5–1)

#	Date	Opponent	Site/stadium	Score	Overall record	SEC record
51	May 3	at Arkansas	Baum–Walker Stadium • Fayetteville, Arkansas	3–9	35–16	15–10
52	May 4	at Arkansas	Baum–Walker Stadium • Fayetteville, Arkansas	7–3	36–16	16–10
53	May 5	at Arkansas	Baum–Walker Stadium • Fayetteville, Arkansas	3–2	37–16	17–10
54	May 10	Auburn	Sewell–Thomas Stadium • Tuscaloosa, Alabama	1–0	38–16	18–10
55	May 11	Auburn	Sewell–Thomas Stadium • Tuscaloosa, Alabama	7–1	39–16	19–10
56	May 12	Auburn	Sewell–Thomas Stadium • Tuscaloosa, Alabama	4–0	40–16	20–10

Postseason
SEC Tournament (5–1)

#	Date	Opponent	Site/stadium	Score	Overall record	SEC record
57	May 16	vs Kentucky	Hoover Metropolitan Stadium • Hoover, Alabama	3–2	41–16	20–10
58	May 17	vs Tennessee	Hoover Metropolitan Stadium • Hoover, Alabama	3–1	42–16	20–10
59	May 18	vs Florida	Hoover Metropolitan Stadium • Hoover, Alabama	3–7	42–17	20–10
60	May 18	vs Kentucky	Hoover Metropolitan Stadium • Hoover, Alabama	16–8	43–17	20–10
61	May 19	vs Florida	Hoover Metropolitan Stadium • Hoover, Alabama	10–5	44–17	20–10
62	May 19	vs Florida	Hoover Metropolitan Stadium • Hoover, Alabama	15–5	45–17	20–10

South I Regional (4–0)

#	Date	Opponent	Site/stadium	Score	Overall record	SEC record
63	May 23	Princeton	Sewell–Thomas Stadium • Tuscaloosa, Alabama	19–2	46–17	20–10
64	May 24	South Alabama	Sewell–Thomas Stadium • Tuscaloosa, Alabama	9–3	47–17	20–10
65	May 25	Stetson	Sewell–Thomas Stadium • Tuscaloosa, Alabama	3–1	48–17	20–10
66	May 26	Virginia	Sewell–Thomas Stadium • Tuscaloosa, Alabama	18–8	49–17	20–10

1996 College World Series (1–2)

#	Date	Opponent	Site/stadium	Score	Overall record	SEC record
67	May 31	vs Oklahoma State	Johnny Rosenblatt Stadium • Omaha, Nebraska	7–5	50–17	20–10
68	June 2	vs Miami (FL)	Johnny Rosenblatt Stadium • Omaha, Nebraska	1–15	50–18	20–10
69	June 4	vs Clemson	Johnny Rosenblatt Stadium • Omaha, Nebraska	13–14	50–19	20–10

== Awards and honors ==
Skip Ames

- ABCA All-South Region Team

Andy Bernard

- South I Regional All-Tournament Team

Joe Caruso

- South I Regional All-Tournament Team
- SEC All-Tournament Team
- SEC Tournament MVP

Joel Colgrove

- South I Regional All-Tournament Team
- South I Regional MVP

Doug Hall

- SEC All-Tournament Team

Dustan Mohr

- SEC All-Tournament Team

Chris Moller

- SEC All-Tournament Team
- College World Series All-Tournament Team

Dax Norris

- ABCA All-South Region Team
- First Team All-SEC

Brett Taft

- South I Regional All-Tournament Team

David Tidwell

- South I Regional All-Tournament Team

Tim Young

- Second Team All-SEC
