= 1996 Clemson Tigers baseball team =

American college baseball season

1996 Clemson Tigers baseball

Atlantic Regional champions

College World Series, 2–2
- Conference: Atlantic Coast Conference

Ranking
- Coaches: No. 4
- CB: No. 4
- Record: 51–17 (17–7 ACC)
- Head coach: Jack Leggett (3rd season)
- Assistant coaches: Tim Corbin (3rd season); John Pawlowski (3rd season); Kevin Erminio (1st season)
- Home stadium: Beautiful Tiger Field

1996 Atlantic Coast Conference baseball standings
	Conf.				Overall
Team	W		L	PCT	W		L	PCT
No. 6 Florida State ‍†‍‍^{y}	19	–	5	.792	52	–	17	.754
No. 4 Clemson ‍‍‍^{y}	17	–	7	.708	51	–	17	.750
No. 18 Georgia Tech ‍‍‍^{y}	13	–	11	.542	40	–	24	.625
No. 28 NC State ‍‍‍^{y}	13	–	11	.542	42	–	19	.689
No. 19 Virginia ‍‍‡‍^{y}	11	–	13	.458	44	–	21	.677
North Carolina ‍‍‍	11	–	13	.458	33	–	25	.569
Duke ‍‍‍	9	–	14	.391	39	–	18	.684
Wake Forest ‍‍‍	7	–	16	.304	26	–	32	.448
Maryland ‍‍‍	7	–	17	.292	24	–	27	.471
† – Conference champion ‡ – Tournament champion y – Invited to the NCAA tournament As of June 30, 1996; Rankings from Collegiate Baseball

The 1996 Clemson Tigers baseball team represented Clemson University in the 1996 NCAA Division I baseball season. The team played their home games at Beautiful Tiger Field in Clemson, South Carolina.

The team was coached by Jack Leggett, who completed his third season at Clemson. The Tigers reached the 1996 College World Series, their eighth appearance in Omaha. They lost twice to Miami (FL), with wins against Oklahoma and Alabama, to finish with a 2–2 record in Omaha.

== Roster ==
1996 Clemson Tigers roster
Pitchers: - Kris Benson - Junior; - Billy Koch - Junior; - Ken Vining - Junior; - James Bennett; - Scott Hauser; - Brian Matz; - Doug Roper; - Ray Scott; - David Shepard; - Brian Werner; - Matt White; - Rodney Williams	Catchers: - Matthew LeCroy - Sophomore; Infielders: - Jason Embler - Junior; - Doug Livingston - Senior; - Paul Galloway - Senior; - Kurt Bultman - Freshman; Outfielders: - Gary Burnham - Junior; - Ontrell McCray - Junior; - Jerome Robinson - Senior; - Rusty Rhodes - Senior	Unknown: - Derek Borgert; - Nathan Broome; - Kurt Bultmann; - Eric DeMoura; - Will Duffie; - Matt Padgett; - Ryan Ward

== Schedule ==
Legend
	Clemson win
	Clemson loss
**Bold**	Clemson team member
*	Non-Conference game

1996 Clemson Tigers baseball game log
Regular season

February
Date	Opponent	Rank	Site/stadium	Score	Overall record	ACC record
Feb 16	South Florida*		Beautiful Tiger Field • Clemson, SC	**W** 4–0	1–0	
Feb 17	South Florida*		Beautiful Tiger Field • Clemson, SC	**L** 5–6	1–1	
Feb 18	South Florida*		Beautiful Tiger Field • Clemson, SC	**L** 2–7	1–2	
Feb 23	Maine*		Beautiful Tiger Field • Clemson, SC	**W** 7–3	2–2	
Feb 24	Maine*		Beautiful Tiger Field • Clemson, SC	**W** 6–5	3–2	
Feb 24	Maine*		Beautiful Tiger Field • Clemson, SC	**W** 5–1	4–2	
Feb 25	Maine*		Beautiful Tiger Field • Clemson, SC	**W** 6–1	5–2	
Feb 27	at Tennessee*		Lindsey Nelson Stadium • Knoxville, TN	**W** 8–3	6–2	
Feb 28	at Tennessee*		Lindsey Nelson Stadium • Knoxville, TN	**W** 10–4^{10}	7–2	

March
Date	Opponent	Rank	Site/stadium	Score	Overall record	ACC record
Mar 1	Coastal Carolina*		Beautiful Tiger Field • Clemson, SC	**W** 11–3	8–2	
Mar 2	Coastal Carolina*		Beautiful Tiger Field • Clemson, SC	**W** 8–7	9–2	
Mar 3	Coastal Carolina*		Beautiful Tiger Field • Clemson, SC	**W** 13–4	10–2	
Mar 5	Western Carolina*		Beautiful Tiger Field • Clemson, SC	**W** 4–2	11–2	
Mar 8	Virginia Tech*		Beautiful Tiger Field • Clemson, SC	**W** 8–4	12–2	
Mar 9	Virginia Tech*		Beautiful Tiger Field • Clemson, SC	**W** 6–2	13–2	
Mar 10	Virginia Tech*		Beautiful Tiger Field • Clemson, SC	**W** 4–0	14–2	
Mar 12	Siena*		Beautiful Tiger Field • Clemson, SC	**W** 18–2	15–2	
Mar 13	Siena*		Beautiful Tiger Field • Clemson, SC	**W** 9–3	16–2	
Mar 16	at Duke		Durham Bulls Athletic Park • Durham, NC	**L** 4–7^{7}	16–3	0–1
Mar 16	at Duke		Durham Bulls Athletic Park • Durham, NC	**L** 0–2^{7}	16–4	0–2
Mar 17	at Duke		Durham Bulls Athletic Park • Durham, NC	**W** 7–2	17–4	1–2
Mar 20	Ohio*		Beautiful Tiger Field • Clemson, SC	**W** 11–3	18–4	
Mar 21	Ohio*		Beautiful Tiger Field • Clemson, SC	**L** 3–9	18–5	
Mar 22	Maryland		Beautiful Tiger Field • Clemson, SC	**W** 4–0	19–5	2–2
Mar 23	Maryland		Beautiful Tiger Field • Clemson, SC	**W** 7–0	20–5	3–2
Mar 24	Maryland		Beautiful Tiger Field • Clemson, SC	**W** 16–6	21–5	4–2
Mar 28	at Western Carolina*		Hennon Stadium • Cullowhee, NC	**W** 13–3	22–5	
Mar 29	at Virginia		Davenport Field • Charlottesville, VA	**W** 8–1	23–5	5–2
Mar 30	at Virginia		Davenport Field • Charlottesville, VA	**L** 2–3	23–6	5–3
Mar 31	at Virginia		Davenport Field • Charlottesville, VA	**W** 9–3	24–6	6–3

April
Date	Opponent	Rank	Site/stadium	Score	Overall record	ACC record
Apr 2	Georgia*		Beautiful Tiger Field • Clemson, SC	**W** 5–4	25–6	
Apr 3	at South Carolina*		Sarge Frye Field • Columbia, SC	**W** 4–2	26–6	
Apr 5	Wake Forest		Beautiful Tiger Field • Clemson, SC	**W** 9–1	27–6	7–3
Apr 6	Wake Forest		Beautiful Tiger Field • Clemson, SC	**W** 6–0	28–6	8–3
Apr 7	Wake Forest		Beautiful Tiger Field • Clemson, SC	**L** 7–8	28–7	8–4
Apr 9	Western Carolina*		Beautiful Tiger Field • Clemson, SC	**W** 10–4	29–7	
Apr 10	South Carolina*		Beautiful Tiger Field • Clemson, SC	**W** 11–0	30–7	
Apr 12	at North Carolina		Boshamer Stadium • Chapel Hill, NC	**W** 11–1	31–7	9–4
Apr 13	at North Carolina		Boshamer Stadium • Chapel Hill, NC	**W** 7–5	32–7	10–4
Apr 14	at North Carolina		Boshamer Stadium • Chapel Hill, NC	**W** 7–2	33–7	11–4
Apr 16	at Georgia*		Foley Field • Athens, GA	**L** 2–6	33–8	
Apr 17	South Carolina*		Beautiful Tiger Field • Clemson, SC	**W** 8–0	34–8	
Apr 21	Georgia Southern*		Beautiful Tiger Field • Clemson, SC	**L** 6–8^{10}	34–9	
Apr 21	Georgia Southern*		Beautiful Tiger Field • Clemson, SC	**L** 7–9^{10}	34–10	
Apr 23	at South Carolina*		Sarge Frye Field • Columbia, SC	**W** 7–5	35–10	
Apr 24	Charleston Southern*		Beautiful Tiger Field • Clemson, SC	**W** 12–5	36–10	
Apr 25	NC State		Beautiful Tiger Field • Clemson, SC	**L** 6–18	36–11	11–5
Apr 26	NC State		Beautiful Tiger Field • Clemson, SC	**W** 14–0	37–11	12–5
Apr 27	NC State		Beautiful Tiger Field • Clemson, SC	**L** 1–4^{10}	37–12	12–6

May
Date	Opponent	Rank	Site/stadium	Score	Overall record	ACC record
May 4	Florida State		Beautiful Tiger Field • Clemson, SC	**W** 3–0	38–12	13–6
May 5	Florida State		Beautiful Tiger Field • Clemson, SC	**W** 2–1	39–12	14–6
May 6	Florida State		Beautiful Tiger Field • Clemson, SC	**W** 2–0	40–12	15–6
May 8	Furman*		Beautiful Tiger Field • Clemson, SC	**W** 13–4	41–12	
May 10	at Georgia Tech		Russ Chandler Stadium • Atlanta, GA	**W** 9–8^{10}	42–12	16–6
May 11	at Georgia Tech		Russ Chandler Stadium • Atlanta, GA	**L** 0–4	42–13	16–7
May 12	at Georgia Tech		Russ Chandler Stadium • Atlanta, GA	**W** 9–2	43–13	17–7

Postseason

ACC Tournament
Date	Opponent	Rank	Site/stadium	Score	Overall record	ACCT Record
May 16	vs. (7) Duke	(2)	Boshamer Stadium • Chapel Hill, NC	**W** 6–1	44–13	1–0
May 16	vs. (3) Georgia Tech	(2)	Boshamer Stadium • Chapel Hill, NC	**W** 6–1	45–13	2–0
May 17	vs. (5) Virginia	(2)	Durham Bulls Athletic Park • Durham, NC	**L** 2–4	45–14	2–1
May 18	vs. (1) Florida State	(2)	Durham Bulls Athletic Park • Durham, NC	**L** 1–2	45–15	2–2

NCAA Atlantic Regional
Date	Opponent	Rank	Site/stadium	Score	Overall record	Regional Record
May 23	(6) Charleston Southern	(1)	Beautiful Tiger Field • Clemson, SC	**W** 9–1	46–15	1–0
May 24	(4) Old Dominion	(1)	Beautiful Tiger Field • Clemson, SC	**W** 5–1	47–15	2–0
May 25	(5) West Virginia	(1)	Beautiful Tiger Field • Clemson, SC	**W** 6–3	48–15	3–0
May 26	(2) Tennessee	(1)	Beautiful Tiger Field • Clemson, SC	**W** 12–5	49–15	4–0

NCAA College World Series
Date	Opponent	Rank	Site/stadium	Score	Overall record	CWS record
May 31	(5) Miami (FL)	(4)	Johnny Rosenblatt Stadium • Omaha, NE	**L** 3–7	49–16	0–1
June 2	(8) Oklahoma State	(4)	Johnny Rosenblatt Stadium • Omaha, NE	**W** 5–8^{10}	50–16	1–1
June 4	(1) Alabama	(4)	Johnny Rosenblatt Stadium • Omaha, NE	**W** 14–13	51–16	2–1
June 5	(5) Miami (FL)	(4)	Johnny Rosenblatt Stadium • Omaha, NE	**L** 5–14	51–17	2–2
