= 1996 Southeastern Conference baseball tournament =

- Teams: 8
- Format: Play-in round followed by six-team double elimination
- Finals site: Hoover Metropolitan Stadium; Hoover, Alabama
- Champions: Alabama (3rd title)
- Winning coach: Jim Wells (2nd title)
- MVP: Joe Caruso (Alabama)
- Attendance: 57,231

The 1996 Southeastern Conference baseball tournament was the 1996 postseason baseball championship of the NCAA Division I Southeastern Conference, held at Hoover Metropolitan Stadium in Hoover, Alabama from May 15 through 19. Alabama defeated Florida in the championship game, earning the conference's automatic bid to the 1996 NCAA Division I baseball tournament.

== Format ==
Eight teams qualified for the league tournament. The teams seeded fifth through eighth played a single-elimination play-in round. The two winners of the play-in games advanced to the main bracket, which was a six-team, double-elimination format, the same as the NCAA regional format used through 1998.

== Regular season results ==
Eastern Division
Team	W	L	Pct	GB	Seed
Florida	20	10	.667	--	2
Tennessee	18	12	.600	2	4
Kentucky	15	14	.517	4.5	6
Vanderbilt	14	16	.467	6	8
South Carolina	13	17	.433	7	--
Georgia	8	21	.276	12.5	--

Western Division
Team	W	L	Pct	GB	Seed
Alabama	20	10	.667	--	1
LSU	20	10	.667	--	3
Mississippi State	17	13	.567	3	5
Arkansas	15	15	.500	5	7
Auburn	12	18	.400	8	--
Ole Miss	7	23	.304	13	--

== Tournament ==
=== Play-in games ===
Play-in game
6	Kentucky	7
7	Arkansas	5

Play-in game
5	Mississippi State	8
8	Vanderbilt	5

=== Main bracket ===
First round
1	Alabama	3
6	Kentucky	2
2	Florida	6
5	Mississippi State	5
3	LSU	3
4	Tennessee	1

Second round
1	Alabama	3
4	Tennessee	1
2	Florida	6
3	LSU	2
6	Kentucky	4
5	Mississippi State	1

Third round
1	Alabama	3
2	Florida	7
3	LSU	11
6	Kentucky	12

Semifinals
1	Alabama	16
6	Kentucky	8

Final
2	Florida	5	5
1	Alabama	10	15

== All-tournament team ==
Position	Player	School
1B	Chuck Hazzard	Alabama
2B	Joe Caruso	Alabama
3B	Travis Hayes	Kentucky
SS	Brad Freeman	Mississippi State
C	Eric Castaldo	Florida
OF	Chad Green	Kentucky
OF	Doug Hall	Alabama
OF	Dustan Mohr	Alabama
DH	Chris Moller	Alabama
P	R. A. Dickey	Tennessee
P	Eddie Yarnall	LSU
MVP	Joe Caruso	Alabama

== See also ==
- College World Series
- NCAA Division I Baseball Championship
- Southeastern Conference baseball tournament
