= 1996 Florida State Seminoles baseball team =

American college baseball season

1996 Florida State Seminoles baseball

ACC champions NCAA West Regional champions

College World Series, 1–2
- Conference: Atlantic Coast Conference
- Record: 52–17 (19–5 ACC)
- Head coach: Mike Martin (17th year)
- Home stadium: Dick Howser Stadium

1996 Atlantic Coast Conference baseball standings
	Conf.				Overall
Team	W		L	PCT	W		L	PCT
No. 6 Florida State ‍†‍‍^{y}	19	–	5	.792	52	–	17	.754
No. 4 Clemson ‍‍‍^{y}	17	–	7	.708	51	–	17	.750
No. 18 Georgia Tech ‍‍‍^{y}	13	–	11	.542	40	–	24	.625
No. 28 NC State ‍‍‍^{y}	13	–	11	.542	42	–	19	.689
No. 19 Virginia ‍‍‡‍^{y}	11	–	13	.458	44	–	21	.677
North Carolina ‍‍‍	11	–	13	.458	33	–	25	.569
Duke ‍‍‍	9	–	14	.391	39	–	18	.684
Wake Forest ‍‍‍	7	–	16	.304	26	–	32	.448
Maryland ‍‍‍	7	–	17	.292	24	–	27	.471
† – Conference champion ‡ – Tournament champion y – Invited to the NCAA tournament As of June 30, 1996; Rankings from Collegiate Baseball

The 1996 Florida State Seminoles baseball team represented Florida State University in the 1996 NCAA Division I baseball season. The Seminoles played their home games at Dick Howser Stadium, and played as part of the Atlantic Coast Conference. The team was coached by Mike Martin in his seventeenth season as head coach at Florida State.

The Seminoles reached the College World Series, their fourteenth appearance in Omaha, where they finished tied for fifth place after recording a win against Wichita State and a pair of losses to Florida.

== Personnel ==
=== Roster ===
1996 Florida State Seminoles roster
Pitchers: 6 - Mike Davis - Junior; 10 - Chris Chavez - (redshirt) Freshman; 16 - Stephen Neill - Junior; 17 - Josh Davis - Freshman; 21 - Randy Choate - Sophomore; 24 - Wes Crawford - Freshman; 26 - Zach Diaz - Freshman; 31 - Scott Proctor - Freshman; 32 - Chuck Howell - Junior; 33 - Randy Niles - Sophomore; 35 - Scooby Morgan - Senior; 43 - Chris Tramel - Junior; 44 - Robert Tyree - Freshman	Catchers: 12 - Jeremy Salazar - Sophomore; 22 - Henry Mayfield - Freshman; 25 - Jeremiah Klosterman - Freshman; Infielders: 1 - Adam Faurot - Junior; 2 - Geoff Sprague - Junior; 6 - John DeSalvo - Sophomore; 7 - Brooks Badeaux - Sophomore; 9 - Scott Zech - Junior; 15 - Matt Woodward - Sophomore	Outfielders: 14 - Shane Roland - Freshman; 23 - Bryan Senior - Sophomore; 27 - Steve Nedeau - Senior; 29 - Billy Brown - Freshman; 37 - Jeremy Morris - Junior; 39 - J. D. Drew - Sophomore

=== Coaches ===
1996 Florida State Seminoles baseball coaching staff
- Mike Martin - Head coach - 17th year

== Schedule and results ==
Legend
Florida State win
Florida State loss

1996 Florida State Seminoles baseball game log
Regular season

February
Date	Opponent	Site/stadium	Score	Overall record	ACC record
Feb 3	Marshall*	Dick Howser Stadium • Tallahassee, FL	W 16–1	1–0	
Feb 4	Marshall*	Dick Howser Stadium • Tallahassee, FL	W 34–0	2–0	
Feb 10	UNC Asheville*	Dick Howser Stadium • Tallahassee, FL	W 4–2	3–0	
Feb 11	UNC Asheville*	Dick Howser Stadium • Tallahassee, FL	W 16–8	4–0	
Feb 16	Minnesota*	Dick Howser Stadium • Tallahassee, FL	W 9–7	5–0	
Feb 17	Minnesota*	Dick Howser Stadium • Tallahassee, FL	W 23–11	6–0	
Feb 18	Minnesota*	Dick Howser Stadium • Tallahassee, FL	W 8–2	7–0	
Feb 23	at Cal State Fullerton*	Titan Field • Fullerton, CA	L 1–3	7–1	
Feb 24	vs Southern California*	Titan Field • Fullerton, CA	L 8–10	7–2	
Feb 29	at Florida*	Alfred A. McKethan Stadium • Gainesville, FL	W 11–2	8–2	

March
Date	Opponent	Site/stadium	Score	Overall record	ACC record
Mar 2	Florida*	Dick Howser Stadium • Tallahassee, FL	L 4–6	8–3	
Mar 3	Florida*	Dick Howser Stadium • Tallahassee, FL	L 10–11	8–4	
Mar 5	Mercer*	Dick Howser Stadium • Tallahassee, FL	W 10–5	9–4	
Mar 6	Mercer*	Dick Howser Stadium • Tallahassee, FL	W 14–5	10–4	
Mar 8	Coastal Carolina*	Dick Howser Stadium • Tallahassee, FL	W 11–4	11–4	
Mar 9	Coastal Carolina*	Dick Howser Stadium • Tallahassee, FL	W 16–8	12–4	
Mar 10	Coastal Carolina*	Dick Howser Stadium • Tallahassee, FL	W 7–3	13–4	
Mar 12	Maine*	Dick Howser Stadium • Tallahassee, FL	W 14–5	14–4	
Mar 13	Maine*	Dick Howser Stadium • Tallahassee, FL	W 17–5	15–4	
Mar 14	Maine*	Dick Howser Stadium • Tallahassee, FL	W 8–1	16–4	
Mar 15	Maryland	Dick Howser Stadium • Tallahassee, FL	W 8–6	17–4	1–0
Mar 16	Maryland	Dick Howser Stadium • Tallahassee, FL	W 16–2	18–4	2–0
Mar 17	Maryland	Dick Howser Stadium • Tallahassee, FL	W 16–5	19–4	3–0
Mar 20	at North Carolina	Boshamer Stadium • Chapel Hill, NC	W 2–1^{7}>	20–4	4–0
Mar 20	at North Carolina	Boshamer Stadium • Chapel Hill, NC	W 7–1^{7}	21–4	5–0
Mar 21	at North Carolina	Boshamer Stadium • Chapel Hill, NC	W 9–1	22–4	6–0
Mar 22	at Wake Forest	Gene Hooks Stadium • Winston-Salem, NC	W 11–7	23–4	7–0
Mar 23	at Wake Forest	Gene Hooks Stadium • Winston-Salem, NC	W 9–6	24–4	8–0
Mar 24	at Wake Forest	Gene Hooks Stadium • Winston-Salem, NC	W 12–3	25–4	9–0
Mar 29	NC State	Dick Howser Stadium • Tallahassee, FL	W 5–4	26–4	10–0
Mar 31	NC State	Dick Howser Stadium • Tallahassee, FL	W 5–4^{7}	27–4	11–0
Mar 31	NC State	Dick Howser Stadium • Tallahassee, FL	W 5–4^{7}	28–4	12–0

April
Date	Opponent	Site/stadium	Score	Overall record	ACC record
Apr 3	at Jacksonville*	John Sessions Stadium • Jacksonville, FL	W 10–1	29–4	
Apr 5	Miami (FL)*	Dick Howser Stadium • Tallahassee, FL	W 13–2	30–4	
Apr 6	Miami (FL)*	Dick Howser Stadium • Tallahassee, FL	L 2–13	30–5	
Apr 7	Miami (FL)*	Dick Howser Stadium • Tallahassee, FL	W 15–1	31–5	
Apr 9	Jacksonville*	Dick Howser Stadium • Tallahassee, FL	W 8–6	32–5	
Apr 10	at Jacksonville*	John Sessions Stadium • Jacksonville, FL	W 4–1	33–5	
Apr 12	at Miami (FL)*	Mark Light Field • Coral Gables, FL	L 2–6	33–6	
Apr 13	at Miami (FL)*	Mark Light Field • Coral Gables, FL	L 8–9	33–7	
Apr 14	at Miami (FL)*	Mark Light Field • Coral Gables, FL	L 4–7	33–8	
Apr 17	Jacksonville*	Dick Howser Stadium • Tallahassee, FL	W 9–4	34–8	
Apr 19	Duke	Dick Howser Stadium • Tallahassee, FL	W 6–2	35–8	13–0
Apr 20	Duke	Dick Howser Stadium • Tallahassee, FL	W 14–4	36–8	14–0
Apr 21	Duke	Dick Howser Stadium • Tallahassee, FL	W 9–7	37–8	15–0
Apr 26	Georgia Tech	Dick Howser Stadium • Tallahassee, FL	W 16–4	38–8	16–0
Apr 27	Georgia Tech	Dick Howser Stadium • Tallahassee, FL	W 6–3	39–8	17–0
Apr 28	Georgia Tech	Dick Howser Stadium • Tallahassee, FL	L 1–4	39–9	17–1
Apr 30	Florida Atlantic*	Dick Howser Stadium • Tallahassee, FL	W 9–8	40–9	

May
Date	Opponent	Site/stadium	Score	Overall record	ACC record
May 1	Florida Atlantic*	Dick Howser Stadium • Tallahassee, FL	W 13–5	41–9	
May 4	at Clemson	Beautiful Tiger Field • Clemson, SC	L 0–3	41–10	17–2
May 5	at Clemson	Beautiful Tiger Field • Clemson, SC	L 1–2	41–11	17–3
May 6	at Clemson	Beautiful Tiger Field • Clemson, SC	L 0–2	41–12	17–4
May 10	at Virginia	UVA Baseball Field • Charlottesville, VA	W 6–0	42–12	18–4
May 11	at Virginia	UVA Baseball Field • Charlottesville, VA	L 7–9	42–13	18–5
May 12	at Virginia	UVA Baseball Field • Charlottesville, VA	W 6–3	43–13	19–5

Postseason

ACC Tournament
Date	Opponent	Seed	Site/stadium	Score	Overall record	ACCT Record
May 15	(8) Wake Forest	(1)	Durham Bulls Athletic Park • Durham, NC	W 8–4	44–13	1–0
May 16	(5) Virginia	(1)	Greenville Municipal Stadium • Greenville, SC	L 2–3	44–14	1–1
May 17	(7) Duke	(1)	Greenville Municipal Stadium • Greenville, SC	W 7–3	45–14	2–1
May 18	(2) Clemson	(1)	Greenville Municipal Stadium • Greenville, SC	W 8–1	46–14	3–1
May 18	(5) Virginia	(1)	Greenville Municipal Stadium • Greenville, SC	W 8–2	47–14	4–1
May 19	(5) Virginia	(1)	Greenville Municipal Stadium • Greenville, SC	L 1–12	47–15	4–2

NCAA West Regional
Date	Opponent	Seed	Site/stadium	Score	Overall record	NCAAT record
May 23	(6) Northeastern Illinois	(1)	Sunken Diamond • Stanford, CA	W 16–0	48–15	1–0
May 24	(4) UC Santa Barbara	(1)	Sunken Diamond • Stanford, CA	W 10–1	49–15	2–0
May 25	(2) Stanford	(1)	Sunken Diamond • Stanford, CA	W 5–4	50–15	3–0
May 36	(5) Cal State Northridge	(1)	Sunken Diamond • Stanford, CA	W 9–2	51–15	4–0

College World Series
Date	Opponent	Seed	Site/stadium	Score	Overall record	CWS record
June 1	(2) Florida	(7)	Johnny Rosenblatt Stadium • Omaha, NE	L 2–5	51–16	0–1
June 3	(3) Wichita State	(7)	Johnny Rosenblatt Stadium • Omaha, NE	W 8–4	52–16	1–1
June 4	(2) Florida	(7)	Johnny Rosenblatt Stadium • Omaha, NE	L 3–6	52–17	1–2
