= Jeff Guiel =

Canadian former baseball outfielder (born 1974)

- Outfielder
- Born: January 12, 1974 (age 52); North Vancouver, British Columbia, Canada
- Bats: Left Throws: Right

Jeff Guiel (born January 12, 1974) is a Canadian former baseball outfielder.

Guiel is a graduate of Oklahoma State University and was a two time all American. He was inducted into the Oklahoma state Hall of Fame in 2015. Jeff was voted by NCAA as one of the top nine players to play baseball at Oklahoma state.

He was a draft pick of the Anaheim Angels and first played with the Cedar Rapids Kernels in 1997, Lake Elsinore Storm in 1998, then the Erie SeaWolves in 1999 and 2000, the Arkansas Travelers and Salt Lake Stingers in both 2001 and 2002 and again with Salt Lake in 2003, completing his active playing career with the Blue Jays triple A team Syracuse Chiefs in 2004.

He was with Team Canada at the 2004 Summer Olympics in Athens, Greece, which finished in fourth place.

He is the younger brother of former Kansas City Royals and New York Yankees outfielder Aaron Guiel.

He now coaches Lynn Valley Little League 9 selects
