= J. D. Arteaga =

American baseball coach

Current position
- Title: Head coach
- Team: Miami (FL)
- Conference: ACC
- Record: 101–77 (.567)

Biographical details
- Born: August 2, 1974 (age 52); Miami, Florida, U.S.

Playing career
- 1994–1997: Miami (FL)
- Position: Pitcher

Coaching career (HC unless noted)
- 2003–2023: Miami (FL) (associate)
- 2024–present: Miami (FL)

Head coaching record
- Overall: 101–77 (.567)
- Tournaments: NCAA: 5–5

Juan (J.D.) Diego Arteaga Jr. (born August 2, 1974) is an American college baseball coach and currently the head coach for the Miami Hurricanes baseball team. He previously played collegiately and was an associate coach for Miami before becoming head coach.

== Baseball career ==
=== College career ===
After graduating from Westminster Christian School, Arteaga chose to play baseball at the University of Miami. While at Miami, he became the program leader in wins with 43, and games started with 72. Miami reached the College World Series all four years that Arteaga played there. After his professional career ended, Arteaga received his bachelor's degree in criminal justice from the University of Miami.

=== Professional career ===
Arteaga was drafted by the New York Mets in the 26th round of the 1997 MLB draft. Arteaga played for the Mets and Houston Astros minor league organizations but never had a start in the major leagues.

== Coaching career ==
In 2003, after signing with a minor league team for the Texas Rangers, Arteaga received an offer as an associate coach for the Miami Hurricanes baseball team, which he accepted. In 2016, rumors circulated that he might take the head coaching job at FIU for baseball, but he stayed with Miami. While associate coach at Miami, Arteaga specialized as a pitching coach, coaching pitchers including Andrew Walters, Carson Palmquist, Chris McMahon, Slade Cecconi, Bryan Garcia, Andrew Suárez, Carlos Gutiérrez, and Cesar Carrillo. In 2023, after the resignation of head coach Gino DiMare, it was announced that Arteaga would become the next head coach for Miami. In his first game as head coach, Miami rallied in the ninth inning and hit a walk-off hit for his first win as head coach.

== Personal life ==
Arteaga is married to his wife, Ysha, and has a daughter, Ariana. In 2018, Arteaga's son Ari was killed in a car crash at the age of 16. In his honor, Arteaga and his family created the "Be the Light" foundation, a nonprofit organization that awards scholarships and resources to those in need.

Arteaga is a very good friend of Alex Rodriguez; Rodriguez and Arteaga were teammates at Westminster Christian School. Arteaga told Sports Illustrated, "We knew he'd be a good player, but no one saw him (Rodriguez) being what he is." The two did not see each other that often when Arteaga was in college with Rodriguez's ascent to the major leagues, but they still keep in touch. Along with Rodriguez, Arteaga is also close friends with Boston Red Sox manager Alex Cora. Arteaga and Cora bonded at Miami where they played baseball together. After learning of Ari's death, Cora invited the Arteaga family to Boston so Arteaga's family could get away from Miami and be together. Regarding Cora's invitation, Ysha said that Cora "called at a good time."

On February 5, 2003, Miami retired Arteaga's uniform No. 33 for baseball; he was inducted into the Miami Hurricanes Baseball Hall of Fame in 2007.

== Head coaching record ==
Record table
Season	Team	Overall	Conference	Standing	Postseason
Miami Hurricanes (Atlantic Coast Conference) (2024–present)
2024	Miami (FL)	27–30	11–19	6th (Coastal)	ACC Tournament
2025	Miami (FL)	35–27	15–14	9th	NCAA Super Regional
2026	Miami (FL)	39–20	16–14	T–5th	NCAA Regional
Miami (FL):		101–77 (.567)	42–47 (.472)		
Total:		101–77 (.567)			
National champion Postseason invitational champion Conference regular season champion Conference regular season and conference tournament champion Division regular season champion Division regular season and conference tournament champion Conference tournament champion
