= 1996 NCAA Division I baseball tournament =

- Season: 1996
- Teams: 48
- Finals site: Johnny Rosenblatt Stadium; Omaha, NE
- Champions: LSU (3rd title)
- Runner-up: Miami (FL) (15th CWS Appearance)
- Winning coach: Skip Bertman (3rd title)
- MOP: Pat Burrell (Miami (FL))
- Television: ESPN Networks, CBS Sports

The 1996 NCAA Division I baseball tournament was played at the end of the 1996 NCAA Division I baseball season to determine the national champion of college baseball. The tournament concluded with eight teams competing in the College World Series, a double-elimination tournament in its fiftieth year. Eight regional competitions were held to determine the participants in the final event. Each region was composed of six teams, resulting in 48 teams participating in the tournament at the conclusion of their regular season, and in some cases, after a conference tournament. The fiftieth tournament's champion was LSU, coached by Skip Bertman. The Most Outstanding Player was Pat Burrell of Miami (FL).

== Regionals ==
The opening rounds of the tournament were played across eight regional sites across the country, each consisting of a six-team field. Each regional tournament is double-elimination, however region brackets are variable depending on the number of teams remaining after each round. The winners of each regional advanced to the College World Series.

Bold indicates winner.

=== Atlantic Regional ===
Hosted by Clemson at Tiger Field in Clemson, South Carolina

First round
1	**Clemson**	**9**
6	Charleston Southern	1
2	Tennessee	4
5	**West Virginia**	**8**
3	**Georgia Southern**	**6**
4	Old Dominion	0

Second round
1	**Clemson**	**5**
4	Old Dominion	1
5	**West Virginia**	**9**
3	Georgia Southern	4
2	**Tennessee**	**8**
6	Charleston Southern	4

Third round
1	**Clemson**	**6**
5	West Virginia	3
2	**Tennessee**	**6**
3	Georgia Southern	1

Semifinals
2	**Tennessee**	**10**
5	West Virginia	4

Final
1	**Clemson**	**12**	–
2	Tennessee	5	–

=== Central I Regional ===
Hosted by Texas at Disch–Falk Field in Austin, Texas

First round
1	Miami (FL)	4
6	**Sam Houston State**	**5**
2	Long Beach State	3
5	**SW Missouri State**	**5**
3	Texas	2
4	**UCLA**	**5**

Second round
6	Sam Houston State	2
3	**Texas**	**4**
1	**Miami (FL)**	**5**
2	Long Beach State	2
5	**SW Missouri State**	**13**
4	UCLA	2
6	Sam Houston State	2
4	**UCLA**	**10**

Third round
3	Texas	7
1	**Miami (FL)**	**9**
5	SW Missouri State	4
4	**UCLA**	**9**^{10}

Semifinals
1	**Miami (FL)**	**8**
5	SW Missouri State	2

Final
1	**Miami (FL)**	**8**
4	UCLA	4

=== Central II Regional ===
Hosted by Texas Tech at Dan Law Field in Lubbock, Texas

First round
1	**Southern California**	**20**
6	Akron	10
2	Texas Tech	2
5	**Fresno State**	**12**
3	**Oklahoma State**	**6**
4	Arkansas	5

Second round
1	**Southern California**	**15**
4	Arkansas	5
5	Fresno State	5
3	**Oklahoma State**	**12**
6	Akron	2
2	**Texas Tech**	**7**

Third round
1	Southern California	3
3	**Oklahoma State**	**9**
5	Fresno State	2
2	**Texas Tech**	4

Semifinals
1	**Southern California**	**13**^{11}
2	Texas Tech	10

Final
3	**Oklahoma State**	**10**	–
1	Southern California	2	–

=== East Regional ===
Hosted by Florida at Alfred A. McKethan Stadium in Gainesville, Florida

First round
1	**Florida**	**7**
6	Bucknell	0
2	UCF	7
5	**UMass**	**8**
3	NC State	3
4	**South Florida**	**12**

Second round
1	**Florida**	**12**
3	NC State	9
5	UMass	8
4	**South Florida**	**14**
6	Bucknell	1
2	**UCF**	**13**

Third round
1	**Florida**	**6**^{13}
4	South Florida	4
5	**UMass**	**7**
2	UCF	5

Semifinals
4	South Florida	12
5	**UMass**	**13**

Final
1	**Florida**	**12**	–
5	UMass	2	–

=== Midwest Regional ===
Hosted by Wichita State at Eck Stadium in Wichita, Kansas

First round
1	**Wichita State**	**4**
6	Indiana	0
2	**Cal State Fullerton**	**19**
5	Delaware	8
3	**Rice**	**17**
4	Missouri	4

Second round
1	**Wichita State**	**9**
4	Missouri	2
2	**Cal State Fullerton**	**7**
3	Rice	3
6	**Indiana**	**10**
5	Delaware	8

Third round
1	**Wichita State**	**6**
2	Cal State Fullerton	1
3	**Rice**	**11**
6	Indiana	8

Semifinals
2	Cal State Fullerton	10
3	**Rice**	**13**

Final
1	**Wichita State**	**16**	–
3	Rice	6	–

=== South I Regional ===
Hosted by Alabama at Sewell–Thomas Stadium in Tuscaloosa, Alabama

First round
1	**Alabama**	**19**
6	Princeton	2
2	Virginia	1
5	**Notre Dame**	12
3	South Alabama	8
4	**Stetson**	**9**

Second round
1	**Alabama**	**9**
3	South Alabama	3
5	Notre Dame	6
4	**Stetson**	**7**
6	Princeton	2
2	**Virginia**	**12**

Third round
1	**Alabama**	**3**
4	Stetson	1
5	Notre Dame	1
2	**Virginia**	**7**

Semifinals
4	Stetson	4
2	**Virginia**	**5**^{10}

Final
1	**Alabama**	**18**	–
2	Virginia	8	–

=== South II Regional ===
Hosted by Louisiana State at Alex Box Stadium in Baton Rouge, Louisiana

First round
1	**LSU**	**8**
6	Austin Peay	5
2	Georgia Tech	3
5	**New Orleans**	**13**
3	UNLV	7
4	**Tulane**	**10**

Second round
1	**LSU**	**7**
3	UNLV	6
5	**New Orleans**	**13**
4	Tulane	5
6	Austin Peay	3
2	**Georgia Tech**	**14**

Third round
1	**LSU**	**17**
5	New Orleans	4
4	Tulane	4
2	**Georgia Tech**	**7**

Semifinals
5	New Orleans	7
2	**Georgia Tech**	**12**

Final
1	**LSU**	**29**	—
2	Georgia Tech	13	—

=== West Regional ===
Hosted by Stanford at Sunken Diamond in Stanford, California

First round
1	**Florida State**	**16**
6	Northeastern Illinois	0
2	**Stanford**	**10**
5	Cal State Northridge	5
3	**Mississippi State**	**6**
4	UC Santa Barbara	2

Second round
1	**Florida State**	**10**
4	UC Santa Barbara	1
2	**Stanford**	**8**
3	Mississippi State	6
6	Northeastern Illinois	1
5	**Cal State Northridge**	**18**

Third round
1	**Florida State**	**5**
2	Stanford	4
3	Mississippi State	19
5	**Cal State Northridge**	**20**

Semifinals
2	Stanford	3
5	**Cal State Northridge**	**4**

Final
1	**Florida State**	**9**	—
5	Cal State Northridge	2	—

== College World Series ==
The championship game ended dramatically when LSU's Warren Morris hit a two-out, two-run home run against Miami reliever Robbie Morrison in the bottom of the ninth inning to lift the Tigers to a 9–8 victory over the Hurricanes. It was Morris's only home run of the 1996 season. Morris, an All-American in 1995, missed much of the 1996 season after suffering a wrist injury early in the campaign.

Oklahoma State's participation in CWS marked the last athletic event for the Big 8 Conference. The Big 8 was absorbed into the new Big 12 on July 1, 1996.

=== Participants ===
Seeding	School	Conference	Record (conference)	Head coach	CWS appearances	CWS best finish	CWS record
1	Alabama	SEC	49–17 (20–10)	Jim Wells	2 (last: 1983)	2nd (1983)	4–4
2	Florida	SEC	48–16 (20–10)	Andy Lopez	2 (last: 1991)	3rd (1991)	3–4
3	Wichita State	MVC	54–9 (24–4)	Gene Stephenson	6 (last: 1993)	1st (1989)	16–9
4	Clemson	ACC	49–15 (17–7)	Jack Leggett	7 (last: 1995)	5th (1958, 1959, 1976)	4–14
5	Miami (FL)	n/a	47–13 (n/a)	Jim Morris	14 (last: 1995)	1st (1982, 1985)	29–25
6	LSU	SEC	48–15 (20–10)	Skip Bertman	7 (last: 1994)	1st (1991, 1993)	15–11
7	Florida State	ACC	51–15 (19–5)	Mike Martin	14 (last: 1995)	2nd (1970, 1986)	18–28
8	Oklahoma State	Big 8	45–19 (17–9)	Gary Ward	17 (last: 1993)	1st (1959)	38–32

=== Results ===
==== Bracket ====
First round	Second round
1	Alabama	7
8	Oklahoma State	5
1	Alabama	1
5	Miami (FL)	15
4	Clemson	3
5	Miami (FL)	7
Bracket One
8	Oklahoma State	5
4	Clemson	8^{10}
1	Alabama	13
4	Clemson	14
2	Florida	5
7	Florida State	2
2	Florida	4
6	LSU	9
3	Wichita State	8
6	LSU	9
Bracket Two
7	Florida State	8
3	Wichita State	4
2	Florida	6
7	Florida State	3

Semifinals
5	Miami (FL)	14	—
4	Clemson	5	—
6	LSU	2	—
2	Florida	1	—

Finals
5	Miami (FL)	8
6	LSU	9

==== Game results ====
Date	Game	Winner	Score	Loser	Notes
May 31	Game 1	Alabama	7–5	Oklahoma State	
May 31	Game 2	Miami (FL)	7–3	Clemson	
June 1	Game 3	Florida	5–2	Florida State	
June 1	Game 4	LSU	9–8	Wichita State	
June 2	Game 5	Miami (FL)	15–1	Alabama	
June 2	Game 6	Clemson	8–5 (10 innings)	Oklahoma State	Oklahoma State eliminated
June 3	Game 7	LSU	9–4	Florida	
June 3	Game 8	Florida State	8–4	Wichita State	Wichita State eliminated
June 4	Game 9	Clemson	14–13	Alabama	Alabama eliminated
June 4	Game 10	Florida	6–3	Florida State	Florida State eliminated
June 5	Game 11	Miami (FL)	14–5	Clemson	Clemson eliminated
June 6	Game 12	LSU	2–1	Florida	Florida eliminated
June 8	Final	LSU	9–8	Miami (FL)	LSU wins CWS

== All-Tournament Team ==
The following players were members of the College World Series All-Tournament Team.

Position	Player	School
P	J.D. Arteaga	Miami (FL)
P	Ed Yarnall	LSU
C	Tim Lanier	LSU
1B	Chris Moller	Alabama
2B	Rudy Gomez	Miami (FL)
3B	Pat Burrell (MOP)	Miami (FL)
SS	Alex Cora	Miami (FL)
OF	Justin Bowles	LSU
OF	Michael DeCelle	Miami (FL)
OF	Brad Wilkerson	Florida
DH	Chuck Hazzard	Florida

=== Notable players ===
- Alabama: Dustan Mohr, Tim Young
- Clemson: Kris Benson, Billy Koch, Matt LeCroy, Ken Vining
- Florida: David Eckstein, Mark Ellis, Josh Fogg, Paul Rigdon, Brad Wilkerson, Chuck Hazzard
- Florida State: Randy Choate, J. D. Drew
- LSU: Brett Laxton, Warren Morris, Ed Yarnall, Eddy Furniss
- Miami (FL): Pat Burrell, Alex Cora
- Oklahoma State: Dave Maurer, Josh Holliday, Brian Aylor
- Wichita State: Casey Blake, Braden Looper

== Tournament notes ==
- LSU's 29–13 victory over Georgia Tech sets a new tournament record for most combined runs (42).

== See also ==
- 1996 NCAA Division II baseball tournament
- 1996 NCAA Division III baseball tournament
- 1996 NAIA World Series
