= Pat Burrell =

American baseball player (born 1976)

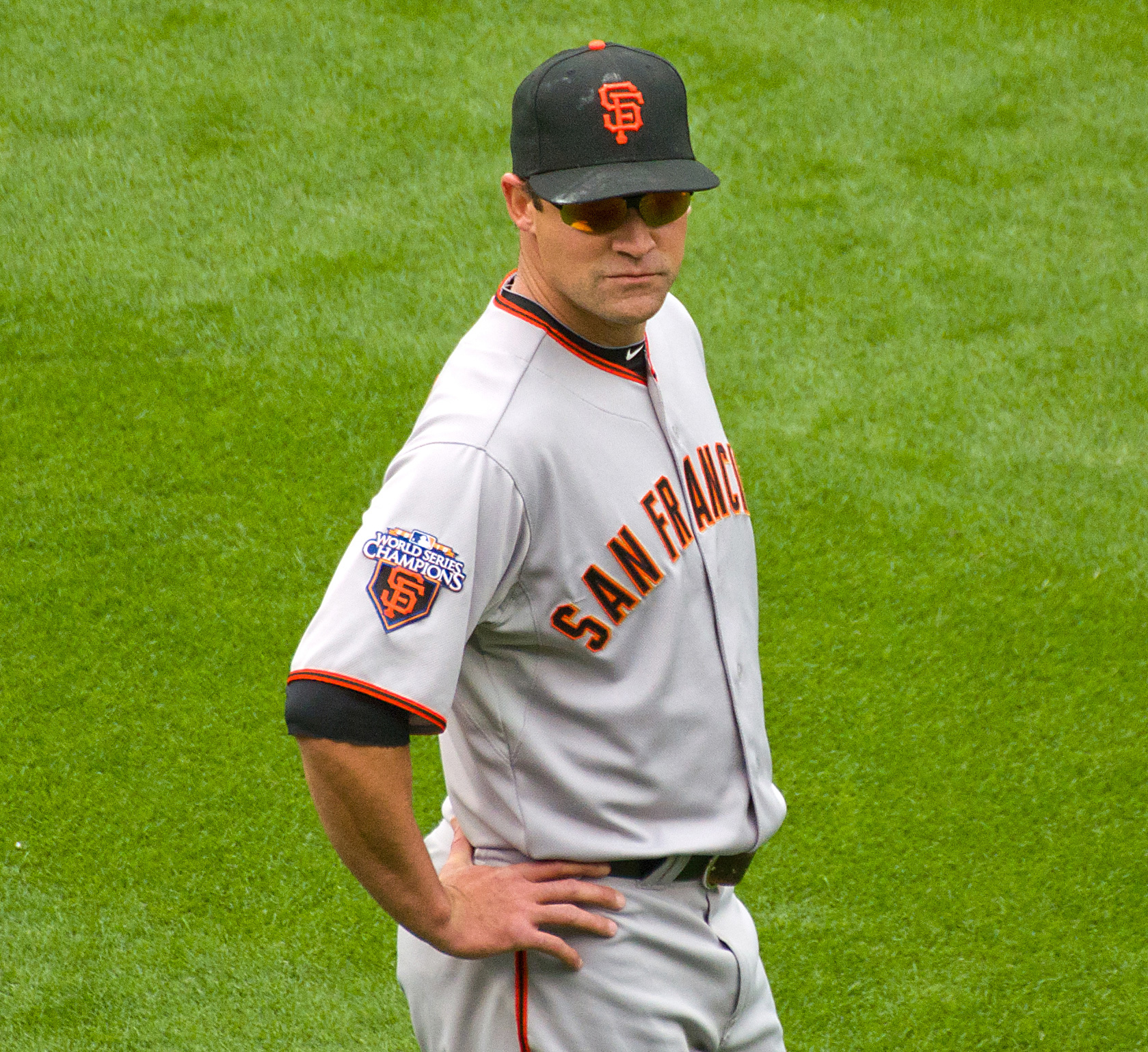
- Burrell with the Giants in 2011
- Left fielder
- Born: October 10, 1976 (age 50); Eureka Springs, Arkansas, U.S.
- Batted: Right Threw: Right

MLB debut
- May 24, 2000, for the Philadelphia Phillies

Last MLB appearance
- September 28, 2011, for the San Francisco Giants

MLB statistics
- Batting average: .253
- Home runs: 292
- Runs batted in: 976
- Stats at Baseball Reference

Teams
- As player: Philadelphia Phillies (2000–2008); Tampa Bay Rays (2009–2010); San Francisco Giants (2010–2011); As coach: San Francisco Giants (2024–2025)

Career highlights and awards
- 2× World Series champion (2008, 2010); Golden Spikes Award (1998); Philadelphia Phillies Wall of Fame

Patrick Brian Burrell (born October 10, 1976), nicknamed "Pat the Bat", is an American former professional baseball outfielder. He played in Major League Baseball (MLB) for the Philadelphia Phillies, Tampa Bay Rays, and San Francisco Giants. Burrell won two World Series championships (2008, 2010). During his playing days, he stood 6 feet 4 inches (1.93 m) tall, weighing 235 pounds (107 kg). He batted and threw right-handed.

Burrell attended the University of Miami, where he won the Golden Spikes Award in 1998. On June 2, 1998, he was the first overall draft pick by the Philadelphia Phillies. After two years in the minor leagues, Burrell was called up by the Phillies in 2000, and he finished fourth in voting for the National League Rookie of the Year Award. After hitting 27 home runs (HR) in 2001 (the first of eight straight years in which Burrell would hit at least 20), he hit a career-high 37 home runs in 2002 and finished 14th in NL Most Valuable Player Award voting. In 2003, Burrell signed a six-year contract with the Phillies but batted a career-low .209, with 21 home runs. In 2004, he batted .257 with 24 home runs but missed several games with a wrist injury. Burrell hit 32 home runs in 2005 and finished seventh in NL MVP Award voting after he set a career high with 117 runs batted in (RBI). In 2006, he batted .258, with 29 home runs, and 95 RBI but was benched for a few games due to a slump after April. Burrell batted .256 with 30 home runs in 2007 as the Phillies reached the playoffs for the first time in his career. He hit a home run in the playoffs as the Phillies were swept in the first round. In 2008, Burrell hit 33 home runs as the Phillies reached the playoffs again, winning the World Series.

After the 2008 season, Burrell became a free agent. He signed a two-year deal with the Tampa Bay Rays to be their designated hitter. In 2009, Burrell batted a disappointing .221 with 14 home runs. After he batted only .202 with two home runs in his first 24 games of the 2010 season, Burrell was designated for assignment by the Rays. He became a free agent and signed with the San Francisco Giants several days later. Burrell took over as San Francisco's left fielder and hit 18 home runs in 96 games for the Giants, helping to lead them into the playoffs. He had a key double versus his former team, the Phillies, as the Giants defeated them on their way to the World Series. That fall, Burrell got his second World Series ring as the Giants emerged victorious against the Texas Rangers. The following year, he signed a one-year deal to return for the Giants’ 2011 season; however, Burrell ultimately lost his left field job, as he batted .230, with a career-low 7 home runs, in 92 games, while battling what would be a career-ending foot injury.

Burrell filed for free agency on October 30, 2011. On April 12, 2012, it was announced that Philadelphia would sign him to a one-day contract, in order that he could finish his career as a Phillie. On May 19, 2012, at Citizens Bank Park, prior to the Phillies-Boston Red Sox game, Burrell threw out the ceremonial first pitch and subsequently retired.

In March 2012, Burrell was named as a special assignment scout for the Giants and an assistant to General Manager (GM) Brian Sabean.

== Early life ==
Patrick Brian Burrell was born on October 10, 1976, in Eureka Springs, Arkansas. Burrell attended San Lorenzo Valley High School in Felton, California, as a freshman. After his freshman year, he transferred to Bellarmine College Preparatory in San Jose, where he played baseball and football. In the football program, playing quarterback, Burrell competed against Tom Brady, who played for rival Junipero Serra High School in San Mateo, California. He decided to concentrate on baseball in his senior year, however, and he was named the California Coaches Association Player of the Year after he batted .369 with 11 home runs.

== College career ==
After graduating from high school in 1995, Burrell was drafted by the Boston Red Sox in the 43rd round of the 1995 Major League Baseball (MLB) Draft. Instead of signing, he chose to attend the University of Miami, where he played third base and was a teammate of Aubrey Huff. As a freshman, he was selected as a First-Team All-American by Baseball America and the Collegiate Baseball Newspaper. He was also named the Most Outstanding Player of the 1996 College World Series, joining Dave Winfield and Phil Nevin as the only players to win the award without winning the series. In the summer of 1996, he played collegiate summer baseball in the Cape Cod Baseball League for the Hyannis Mets and was named a league all-star. In his sophomore year, he was again named a First-Team All-American by Baseball America and the Collegiate Baseball Newspaper but also by the Sporting News this year. He was named Baseball America's Summer Player of the year in 1997. In 1998, as a junior, he won the Golden Spikes Award as the best player in college baseball. Burrell finished his college career with 61 home runs, 187 runs batted in (RBI), and 170 walks in 162 games. His .442 batting average was seventh all-time by an NCAA player, and his slugging percentage of .888 was second only to Pete Incaviglia. In February 2008, Burrell was inducted into the University of Miami Sports Hall of Fame.

== Professional career ==
=== Draft and minor leagues ===
In 1998 Burrell was drafted by the Philadelphia Phillies with the first overall pick in the 1998 MLB draft. On July 24, 1998, Burrell and the Phillies agreed to a five-year contract with a $3.15 million signing bonus. Upon signing, Burrell was assigned to the Class A-Advanced Clearwater Phillies of the Florida State League, and he was moved to first base because Scott Rolen, Philadelphia's third baseman in the major leagues, had just won the National League (NL) Rookie of the Year Award. With Clearwater in 1998, Burrell batted .303 with 7 home runs and 30 RBI in 37 games.

Entering the 1999 season, Burrell was named the top prospect in the Phillies' organization by Baseball America, who also named him baseball's 19th best prospect. He spent most of the season with the Double-A Reading Phillies of the Eastern League, batting .333 with 28 home runs and 90 RBI in 117 games. He was named to the Eastern League's post-season All-Star team and won the Eastern League Rookie of the Year Award. He also played 10 games with the Scranton/Wilkes-Barre Red Barons of the Triple-A International League, batting .152 with 1 home run and 4 RBI. In addition to playing first base, he was used as an outfielder with both teams.

Burrell was named the Phillies' top prospect and the second-best prospect in baseball by Baseball America in 2000. He began the season with Scranton/Wilkes-Barre. Playing first base and the outfield, he batted .294 with 4 home runs and 25 RBI in 40 games.

=== Philadelphia Phillies (2000–2008) ===
==== 2000 ====
On May 23, 2000, Burrell was called up by the Phillies. On May 24, he replaced Kevin Jordan (who had been filling in for injured Opening Day first baseman Rico Brogna) as the Phillies' first baseman. Making his major league debut that day, Burrell had two hits (his first coming against Octavio Dotel) and two RBI in a 9–7 victory over the Houston Astros. The following day, he hit his first career home run in a 10–6 loss to Houston. On June 20, with the Phillies trailing 2–1 against the New York Mets, Burrell hit a home run against Mets' closer Armando Benítez to make the score 2–2 in an eventual 3–2 victory for Philadelphia. The next day, Burrell had five RBI, two home runs, and his first career grand slam in a 10–5 victory for Philadelphia. On July 2, he had four hits and two RBI in a 9–1 victory over the Pittsburgh Pirates. Burrell remained the Phillies' first baseman when Brogna returned in July. He had five RBI, two home runs, and a grand slam on August 8 in a 10–4 victory over the San Diego Padres. On August 9, newly acquired outfielder Travis Lee was moved to first base, and Burrell was moved to left field for the rest of the year. On September 21, he had a game-winning single against Rick White in a 6–5 victory against the Mets. Burrell finished the season with 18 home runs, 79 RBI, and a .260 batting average in 111 games, and received the fourth most votes for the NL Rookie of the Year Award.

==== 2001 ====
On April 14, 2001, Burrell hit a game-winning home run in the sixth inning of a 2–1 victory over the Atlanta Braves. He had a game-winning two-RBI double in the ninth inning as the Phillies beat the Chicago Cubs, 6–3, on April 17. From May 19 to June 2, Burrell had a career-high 14-game hitting streak. During the streak, on May 28, he hit a game-winning two-run home run against Benítez in the tenth inning of a 5–3 win over the Mets. Burrell hit a home run and had four RBI the next day as the Phillies beat the Mets, 7–3. He hit a game-winning, three-run home run on July 4 in a 4–1 victory over the Atlanta Braves. On July 20, Burrell had a home run and five RBI (including the game-winner) as the Phillies beat the Mets, 10–1. He hit home runs in three straight games from July 31 to August 2. On August 10, as the Phillies beat the Los Angeles Dodgers, 10–5, Burrell hit his third career grand slam. He had a home run and three RBI in the final game of the season in a 4–1 victory over the Cincinnati Reds. Burrell finished the season with 27 home runs, 70 RBI, and a .258 batting average in 155 games. His 18 assists led NL outfielders and tied with Raúl Mondesí for most in the major leagues. However, his 162 strikeouts were the third-highest total in Phillies' history at the time, and they currently are the ninth-highest total.

==== 2002 ====
Burrell hit a leadoff walk-off home run on April 7, 2002, in the 11th inning, giving a 3–2 victory over the Florida Marlins. Three days later, Burrell hit a two-run, walk-off home run in the 11th inning to give the Phillies a 7–5 victory over the Braves. He was the first player in the major leagues to hit two such home runs in a four-day period since Albert Belle did it in 1995, and he was the first Phillie to hit two such in a season since Von Hayes hit two in 1989. In May, Burrell hit eight home runs, the most by a Phillie in May since teammate Mike Lieberthal hit eight in 1999. From June 2 through June 16, he had an 11-game hitting streak, his longest of the season. During the streak, on June 2, Burrell tied a career high with five RBI in an 18–3 victory over the Montreal Expos. Burrell had 22 home runs by the All-Star break, the most by a Phillie since Mike Schmidt had 31 by the 1979 All-Star break. On July 15, he hit a game-winning three-run home run against Matt Herges in an 11–8 victory over Montreal. Burrell had two home runs, five RBI, and a grand slam in a 7–6 loss to the Dodgers on August 9. On August 30, Burrell had three RBI (including the game-winner) in a 7–5 victory over the Mets. He recorded his 100th RBI that day, becoming the first Phillie with 100 RBI by August 31 since Greg Luzinski accomplished the feat in 1977. Burrell finished the season with career highs in almost every offensive category, including runs (96), batting average (.286), and games (157). He was the 12th Phillie with 30 home runs and 100 RBI in a season. His 37 home runs were seventh in the NL, and his 116 RBI were third, behind only Lance Berkman (128) and Albert Pujols (127). He was 14th in NL Most Valuable Player Award voting.

==== 2003 ====
On February 3, 2003, Burrell signed a six-year, $50 million contract with the Phillies. He had two home runs and five RBI (including the game-winner) on April 9 in a 16–2 victory over the Braves. The home runs both came against Greg Maddux, making Burrell the sixth player to hit two home runs in a game against Maddux (and the first since Rolen did it in 2001). On May 20, he hit two home runs and had four RBI in an 11–7 victory over the Mets. On August 9, Burrell hit a game-tying solo home run and a game-winning two-run home run in the 8th and 10th innings of an 8–6 victory over the San Francisco Giants. He hit two home runs (including his 100th) on August 22 in a 9–4 victory over the St. Louis Cardinals. On September 28, he had the final hit in Veterans Stadium (a single against Jason Marquis) in a 5–2 loss to Atlanta. Burrell endured a season-long slump, and he was occasionally benched for a few games (often in favor of Ricky Ledée) by Phillies' manager Larry Bowa. In 146 games, he batted .209 with 21 home runs and 64 RBI. However, his 21 home runs were still the second-highest total on the Phillies (teammate Jim Thome led the NL with 47).

==== 2004 ====
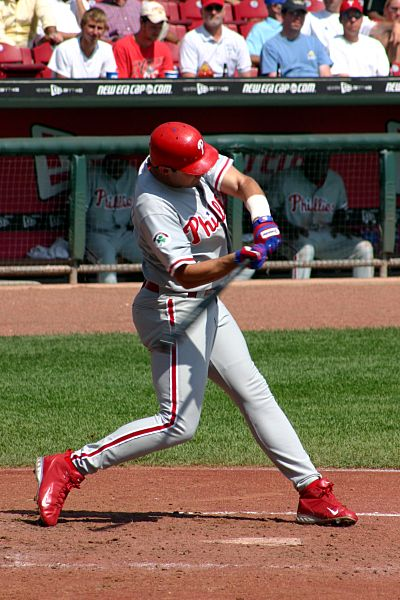
Burrell with the Philadelphia Phillies in September 2004

Burrell had four hits and three RBI on April 27, 2004, in a 7–3 victory over the Cardinals. He also made a leaping catch to take a home run away from Rolen, and he threw out Pujols trying to score from third base on a single by Édgar Rentería. On May 2, Burrell hit his first career pinch-hit home run: a two-run game-tying home run in the ninth inning against Matt Mantei of the Arizona Diamondbacks. The Phillies won the game, 6–5, in extra innings. On May 14, Burrell had four RBI (including the game-winner) in a 6–4 victory over the Colorado Rockies. He had four RBI again on May 18 (including two home runs) in an 8–7 victory over the Dodgers. On July 30, he hit two home runs in a 10–7 loss to the Cubs. On August 3, Burrell strained his left wrist during batting practice, and he was placed on the disabled list (DL) for the first time in his career the next day. He was originally scheduled to have season-ending surgery on August 13, but after getting a second opinion from Dr. Tom Graham, he decided to postpone the surgery and attempt to come back before the season ended. On September 3, he was activated from the disabled list. In 127 games, Burrell batted .257 with 24 home runs and 84 RBI.

==== 2005 ====
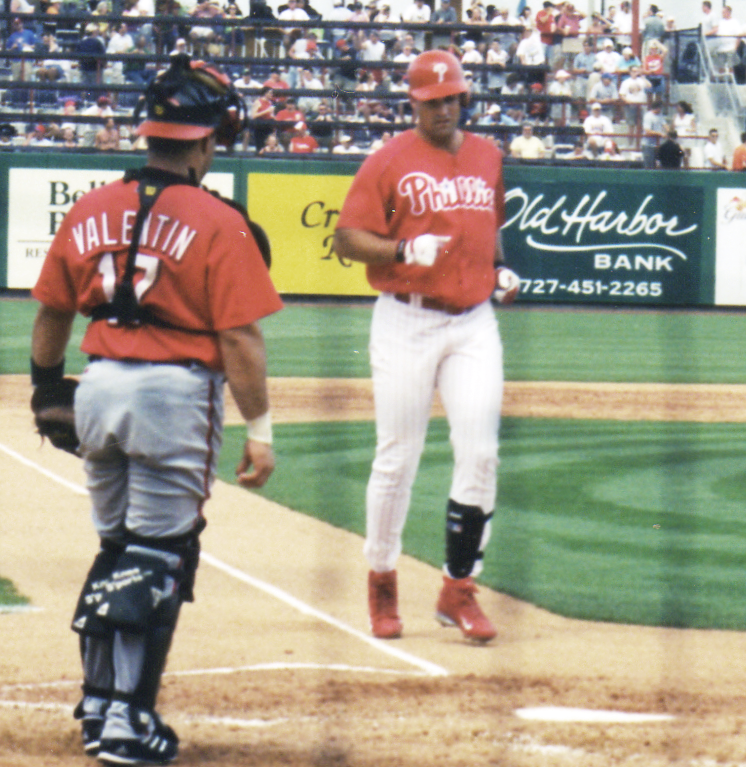
Burrell during 2005 Spring training with the Philadelphia Phillies

On April 9, 2005, Burrell had four hits and five RBI in a 10–4 victory over the Cardinals. He won the first NL Player of the Week Award of the 2005 season on April 10 after accumulating 15 RBI in the first week of the season. On May 12, he had four hits in a 7–5 loss to Cincinnati. He hit a three-run game-winning home run on May 22 in a 7–2 victory over the Baltimore Orioles. He won another Player of the Week Award that day after he batted .500 with two home runs and eight RBI during the week, becoming the first Phillies player to win the award twice in a season since Hayes won it twice in 1986. On June 5, his solo home run against Mike Koplove was the game-winner in a 7–6 victory over Arizona. Four days later, he hit two home runs and had four RBI in a 10–8 victory over the Texas Rangers. On June 11, he hit a game-winning three-run home run in a 7–5 victory over the Milwaukee Brewers. He hit two home runs and had five RBI in a 13–7 victory over Florida on July 14. On July 30, he had four hits and two RBI in an 8–7 victory over Colorado. On August 9, he had four RBI, including a go-ahead three-run home run against Steve Schmoll in an 8–4 victory over the Dodgers. His three-run home run against Jake Peavy on August 12 provided all of the Phillies' runs in a 3–2 victory over San Diego. He had four RBI on September 9 in a 12–5 victory over the Marlins. Two days later, he had four RBI again (including a three-run home run against Ismael Valdez) in an 11–1 victory over Florida.

Burrell finished the season batting .281 with 32 home runs in 154 games, and he set career highs in walks (99) and RBI (117). His 32 home runs led the Phillies, and his 117 RBI were second only to Andruw Jones' 128 (Pujols also had 117). On defense, however, he tied for the lead among all major league left fielders in errors, with seven, and the lowest fielding percentage among them, at .972. Burrell finished seventh in voting for the NL MVP award, and he was the co-winner of the Mike Schmidt MVP Award (along with Chase Utley).

==== 2006 ====
In April 2006, Burrell batted .300 with seven home runs. From April 14 to 27, he had 13 RBI in 11 games. However, he batted .249 for the rest of the season, and in June Philles' manager Charlie Manuel began benching him occasionally (often in favor of David Dellucci). On May 1, Burrell hit a game-winning solo home run in an 8–5 victory over Florida. On May 7, he had three RBI, including a two-run home run against Matt Morris as the Phillies defeated the Giants, 9–5. On June 9, he had three RBI, including a two-run home run against Gary Majewski, but the Phillies lost, 9–8, to the Washington Nationals. The next day, he hit a game-winning two-run home run in a 6–2 victory over the Nationals. On June 15, he hit two home runs and had three RBI against Steve Trachsel, but the Phillies lost to the Mets, 5–4. He had four hits and four RBI in a 14–6 victory over the Giants on July 15. On August 22, his RBI double in the sixth inning was the game-winning RBI in a 6–3 victory over the Cubs. His first inning grand slam against Roger Clemens on September 15 provided all of the Phillies' runs in a 4–3 victory over Houston. On September 20, his fielder's choice was the game-winning RBI in a 6–2 victory over the Cubs. He hit two home runs, had four RBI, and set a career high with four runs scored on September 29 in a 14–2 victory over Florida. In 144 games, Burrell finished the season batting .258 with 29 home runs and 95 RBI.

==== 2007 ====
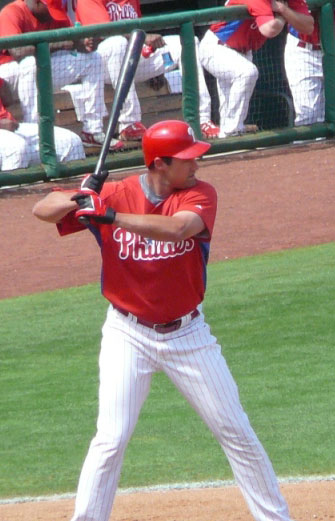
Burrell with the Philadelphia Phillies in 2007

Burrell became the Phillies' longest tenured player in 2007 with the departure of Lieberthal via free agency. He hit only one home run in April but had a .292 batting average. On April 6, he homered and had four RBI (including the game-winner) in an 8–2 victory over Florida. He began to slump after April, batting .157 over the next two months. Once again, Manuel began benching him, using Greg Dobbs, Jayson Werth, or Michael Bourn in left field. On May 11, Burrell hit two home runs and had five RBI in a 7–2 victory over the Cubs. Werth was injured at the end of June, however, and Burrell reclaimed his starting job by batting .435 in July, with six home runs and 22 RBI. From July 1 through the end of the season, he batted .300 with 22 home runs and 65 RBI, starting the final 75 games of the season for the Phillies in left field. On July 14, he had four RBI in a 10–4 victory over St. Louis. Three days later, Burrell hit his 200th career home run in a 15–3 victory over the Dodgers. He had a 14-game hitting streak from July 22 to August 5, tying his career high. On August 17, in an 11–8 victory over the Pirates, Burrell got his 1,000th career hit, a two-run home run. At the end of August, the Phillies faced the Mets, whom they trailed in the NL East by six games, for a four-game series. In the first game of the series, on August 27, Burrell hit a game-winning two-run home run in a 9–2 victory. Two days later, in the third game of the series, he hit a solo home run and had a sacrifice fly (the game-winning RBI) against Óliver Pérez in a 3–2 victory. He hit two home runs in the fourth and final game of the series as the Phillies won 11–10 to sweep the Mets. On September 21, his two-run home run against Shawn Hill provided the game-winning RBI in a 6–3 victory over Washington. Burrell finished the 2007 regular season batting .256 with 30 home runs, 97 RBI, and 114 walks (a career high) in 155 games. Burrell, Ryan Howard, and Jimmy Rollins became the second trio of Phillies with 30 or more home runs (and the first since 1929). On defense, he led major league outfielders in errors, with 10, and his .948 fielding percentage was the lowest among left fielders.

In 2007, the Phillies won the NL East and reached the playoffs for the first time since 1993 and the first time in Burrell's career. Burrell hit a home run against Jeff Francis in the first game of the NL Division Series (NLDS) but had only one other hit in the series as the Phillies were swept by the Colorado Rockies.

==== 2008 ====
Burrell batted .326 in April 2008, with 8 home runs and 24 RBI. He hit two home runs on April 7 (including the game-winner) against Bronson Arroyo in a 5–3 victory over Cincinnati. On April 24, his two-run double against David Riske provided the game-winning RBI in the Phillies' 3–1 victory over Milwaukee. With the double, Burrell got his 23rd and 24th RBI of the month, breaking Hayes' team record for most RBI in April (22). After batting .227 in May (with five home runs), Burrell batted .256 with six home runs in June. His walk-off two-run home run with two outs in the tenth inning gave the Phillies a 6–5 victory over San Francisco on May 2. On May 22, Burrell hit a game-winning pinch-hit home run in a 7–5 victory over Houston. On June 3, he hit a game-winning two-run home run in a 3–2 victory over Cincinnati. He followed up his performance in June by hitting .304 in July with seven home runs, but he slumped over the final two months, batting .191 with seven home runs. He hit a game-winning three-run home run on July 13 in a 6–3 victory over Arizona. On August 15, his home run helped the Phillies defeat the Padres 1–0. Two days later, he hit a game-winning home run in a 2–1 victory over the Padres. He had five RBI (including a game-winning three-run home run against Clayton Kershaw) in a 9–2 victory over the Dodgers on August 23. Burrell finished the season batting .250 with 33 home runs (tied for ninth in the NL), 86 RBI, and 102 walks (third in the NL) in 157 games, and the Phillies won the NL East for the second straight year.

In Game 4 (the final game) of the NLDS against the Brewers, Burrell hit two home runs (a three-run game-winning home run against Jeff Suppan and a solo home run against Guillermo Mota) in a 6–2 victory that gave the Phillies their first playoff series victory since 1993. Four days later, in the first game of the NL Championship Series, he hit a game-winning solo home run in a 3–2 victory over the Dodgers. After going hitless in his first 14 at-bats in the World Series, Burrell doubled against J. P. Howell of the Tampa Bay Rays on October 29 in Game 5 (the final game of the series). Burrell was then replaced by pinch-runner Eric Bruntlett, who scored the game's winning run in the 4–3 victory as the Phillies won their first World Series since 1980. After the series, Burrell was chosen to lead the Phillies' World Series parade.

Burrell filed for free agency on November 6. On December 16, the Phillies signed left fielder Raúl Ibañez to a three-year contract, ending Burrell's tenure in Philadelphia. Burrell's 104 double plays grounded into were the seventh-most in Phillies history, and his 1,273 strikeouts were second only to Schmidt. However, Burrell was fifth in walks (785), eighth in RBI (827), and fourth in home runs (251) as a Phillie. His eight straight seasons with at least 20 home runs were topped only by Schmidt.

=== Tampa Bay Rays (2009–2010) ===
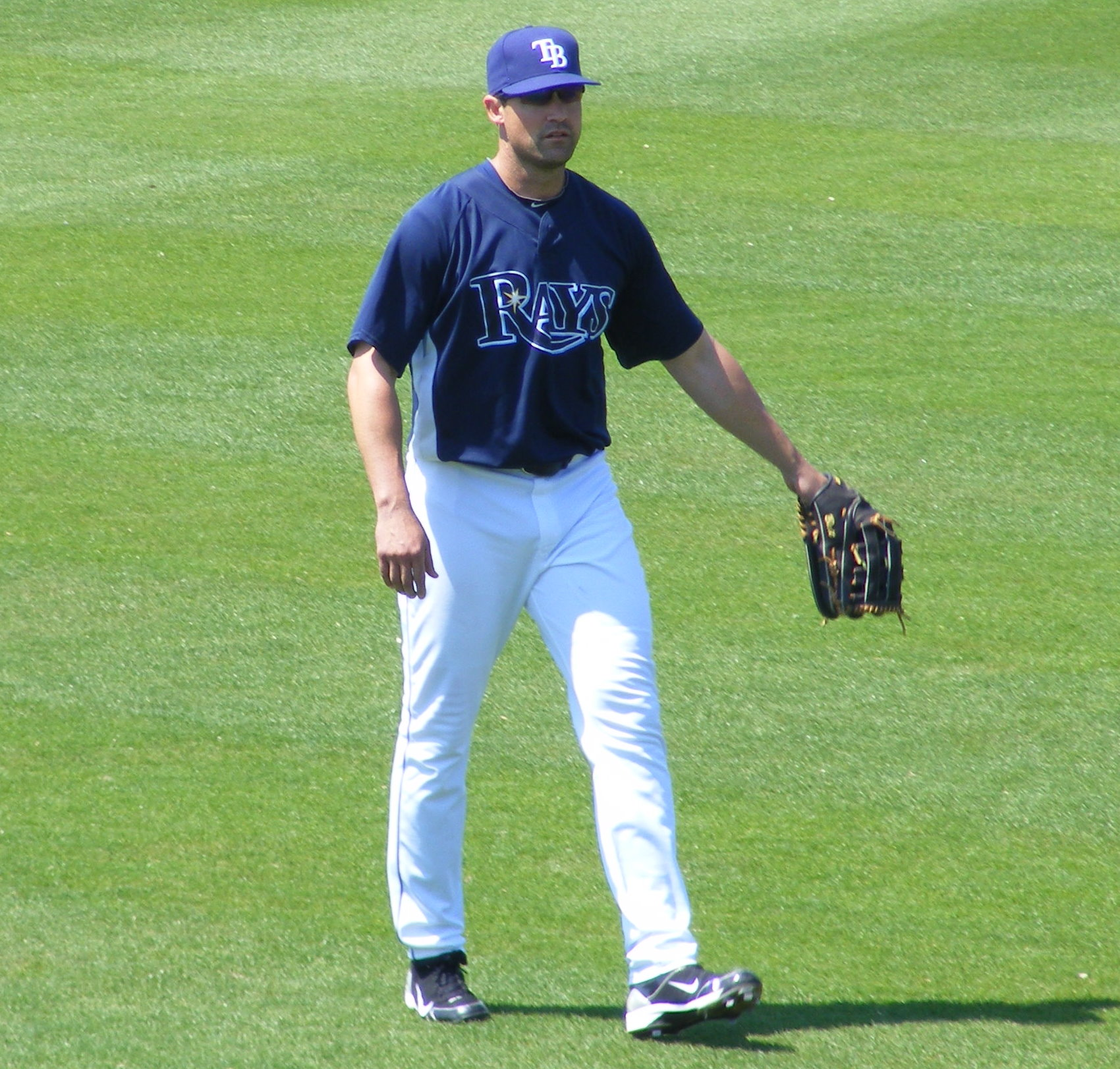
Burrell during 2010 Spring training with the Tampa Bay Rays

On January 5, 2009, the Tampa Bay Rays signed Burrell to a two-year, $16 million contract. They planned to use him as their designated hitter. Burrell got a standing ovation when he returned to Philadelphia for an exhibition series on April 3 and 4. On April 9, Burrell flew to Philadelphia to join the Phillies as they received their World Series rings in a pregame ceremony. After the ceremony, he flew back to Boston for the Rays' game against the Boston Red Sox. On May 17, Burrell was placed on the disabled list (retroactive to May 12) with a neck strain. He was activated from the DL on June 11. On June 24, he hit a game-winning two-run home run and had three RBI in a 7–1 victory over the Phillies. On July 7, he hit a walk-off two-run home run in the 11th inning of a 3–1 victory over the Toronto Blue Jays. On September 2, he had a game-winning RBI single in an 8–5 victory over Boston. He had four RBI against Jason Berken (including a three-run home run) on September 15 in a 10–5 loss to Baltimore. Burrell slumped throughout the 2009 season, and he finished the year batting .221 in 122 games. He set or tied career-lows in hits (91), home runs (14), RBI (64), and walks (57).

Burrell hit a game-winning two-run home run in the 12th inning of a 3–1 victory over Boston on April 17, 2010. On April 27, he hit a game-winning three-run home run in an 8–6 victory over the Oakland Athletics. In his first 24 games of the season, Burrell batted .202 with two home runs and 13 RBI. On May 15, he was designated for assignment and replaced on the Rays' roster by Hank Blalock. Four days later, he became a free agent after clearing waivers.

=== San Francisco Giants (2010–2011) ===
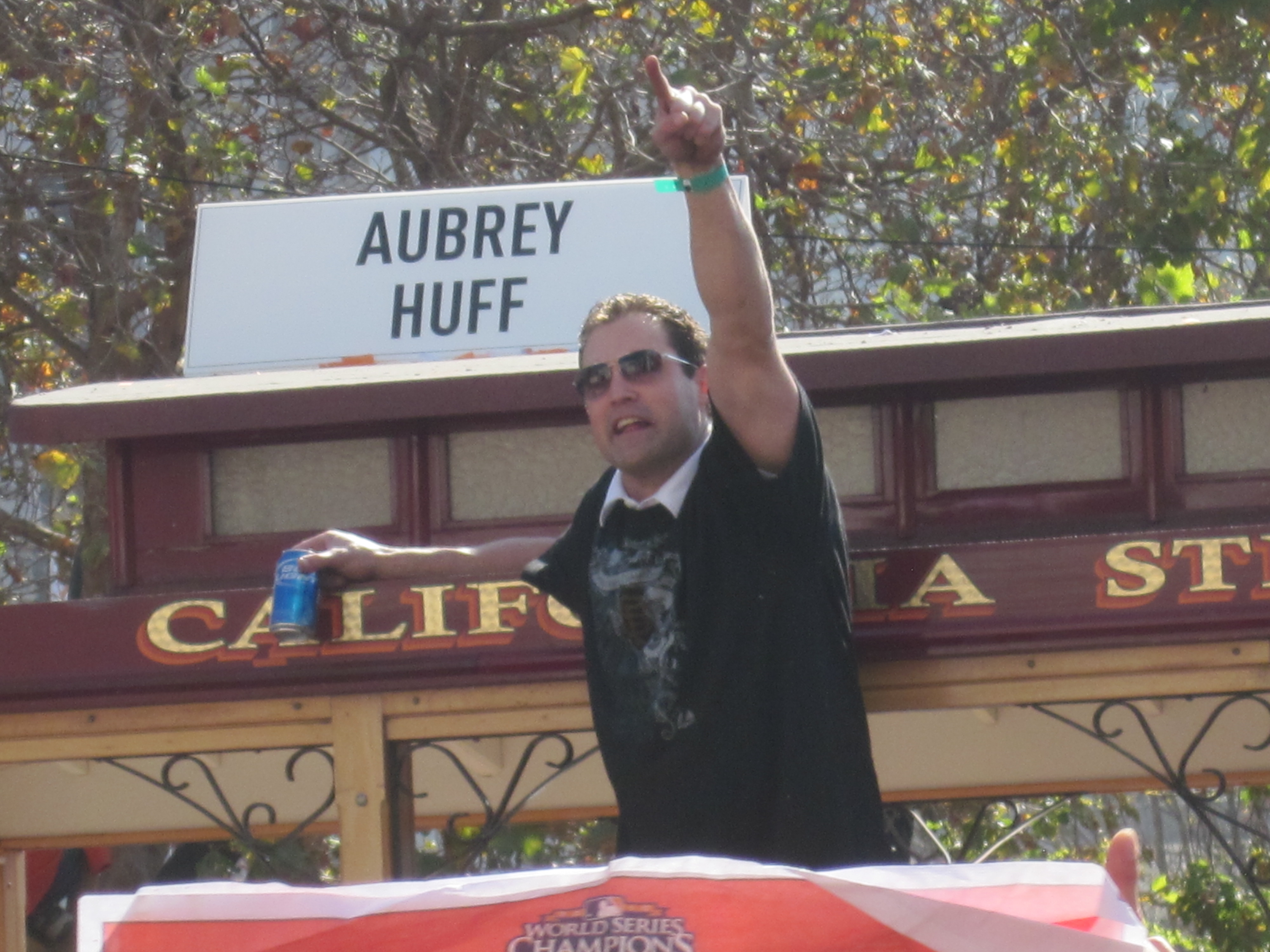
Burrell in the San Francisco Giants' 2010 World Series victory parade

On May 29, 2010, the San Francisco Giants signed Burrell to a minor league contract and assigned him to the triple-A Fresno Grizzlies of the Pacific Coast League. After batting .313 with one home run and six RBI in five games, he was called up to the Giants on June 4 to replace John Bowker, who was optioned to Fresno. The next day, he took over from Aubrey Huff (who moved over to right field) as the Giants' left fielder. On July 31, with the Giants trailing 1–0 to the Dodgers in the eighth inning, Burrell hit a two-run home run to give the Giants a 2–1 victory. On August 6, he hit a game-winning sacrifice fly in the 11th inning of a 3–2 victory over Atlanta. Three days later, the Giants faced the Chicago Cubs for a four-game series. In the first game of the series, Burrell hit a walk-off sacrifice fly in the 11th inning of a 4–3 victory. In the third game, he had three RBI (including a game-winning home run in the eighth inning against Justin Berg) in a 5–4 victory. In the finale, Burrell hit two home runs (including a grand slam) and had five RBI in an 8–7 victory. On August 17, Burrell returned to Philadelphia for his first regular season game there as a member of the opposing team, and he received a standing ovation. He hit a home run in his first at bat of the game, but the Giants lost, 9–3. With the Giants in 2010, Burrell batted .266 with 289 at-bats, 18 home runs, and 51 RBI in 96 games as the Giants won the NL West and advanced to the playoffs for the first time since 2003. Burrell's 2010 totals were 373 at-bats, 94 hits, 20 home runs, and 64 RBI in 120 games.

In Game 2 of the NLDS against Atlanta on October 8, Burrell hit a three-run home run in a 5–4 loss. On October 16, in Game 1 of the NLCS against the Phillies, he had an RBI double against Roy Halladay. Nate Schierholtz then pinch-ran for him, scoring the winning run in the Giants' 4–3 victory. In the World Series, Burrell struck out eleven times in thirteen at-bats, had no hits, and was benched for Game 4. The Giants won the World Series in five games, and Burrell received his second championship ring. "When you talk about the 2010 team, to me, the opening sentence better be about the pitching," said Burrell.

On November 1, Burrell filed for free agency. A month later, on December 3, he signed a one-year, $1 million contract to return to the Giants in 2011. In his first 20 games of 2011, Burrell batted .270 with five home runs and eight RBI. On April 18, he hit a game-winning three-run home run in an 8–1 victory over Colorado. After batting .172 with one RBI over his next 12 games, he was replaced as the Giants' left fielder by Cody Ross, who was replaced as the Giants' right fielder by Schierholtz. On May 4, Burrell had a game-winning RBI single in a 2–0 victory over the Mets. In the first game of a doubleheader against the Cubs on June 28, Burrell had a home run and three RBI in a 13–7 victory. He had a game-winning RBI single on July 7 in a 2–1 victory over San Diego. On July 15, Burrell was placed on the disabled list with a potentially career-ending foot injury. He returned from the DL on August 31, but he was not able to start regularly upon returning. For the final game of the year (a 6–3 loss to Colorado on September 28), Burrell started in left field after asking Giants' manager Bruce Bochy to put him in the lineup since it was potentially his final game. He finished the year batting .230 with career-lows in games (92), at bats (183), hits (42), home runs (seven), and RBI (21). On October 30, he filed for free agency.

Burrell signed a one-day contract with the Philadelphia Phillies on May 19, 2012, so he could officially retire as a Phillie. It was announced on February 28, 2015, that Burrell would be inducted onto the Phillies Wall of Fame. He was subsequently inducted on Friday, July 31. He stated, "I always knew that the fans were behind me, even through the tough times. When David called and told me I had been voted in by the fans, it was overwhelming." Burrell was the 37th inductee to the Wall of Fame.

=== "Met Killer" ===
Burrell showed a penchant for hitting clutch home runs against the New York Mets. In 2007, Burrell hit four home runs in a four-game series sweep against the Mets in late August. In total, he hit 42 home runs against the Mets through the 2011 season, his highest total against any team, which ranked fifth all-time in home runs hit against the franchise at the time of his departure from Philadelphia (he has since fallen to sixth, having been passed by Chipper Jones.) Batting .264 at the Phillies' home parks against a .228 mark at Shea Stadium, Burrell nonetheless enjoyed playing in New York, citing the atmosphere and memorable home runs against Mets pitchers, including two in back-to-back games against then-closer Armando Benítez.

== Post-playing career ==
After his playing career ended, Burrell became a special assignment scout for the San Francisco Giants in Scottsdale, Arizona.

=== Coaching career ===
He was formerly a hitting coach for the San Jose Giants, the Giants' farm team in the California League.

On November 10, 2023, the San Francisco Giants announced that Burrell would be their hitting coach alongside Justin Viele.

== Personal life ==
Pat had an English Bulldog named Elvis who was featured in the Phillies 2008 World Series Parade. Elvis passed on in September 2014.

== See also ==
- List of Major League Baseball career home run leaders

Awards and achievements
Preceded by Bobby Abreu	Mike Schmidt Most Valuable Player (with Chase Utley); 2005	Succeeded by Ryan Howard
