= 1996 NCAA Division I baseball season =

Baseball season

- Number of teams: 275

NCAA tournament

College World Series
- Champions: LSU (3rd title)
- Runners-up: Miami (FL) (15th CWS Appearance)
- Winning coach: Skip Bertman (3rd title)
- MOP: Pat Burrell (Miami (FL))

Seasons
- ← 1995 1997 →

The 1996 NCAA Division I baseball season, play of college baseball in the United States organized by the National Collegiate Athletic Association (NCAA) began in the spring of 1996. The season progressed through the regular season and concluded with the 1996 College World Series. The College World Series, held for the fiftieth time in 1996, consisted of one team from each of eight regional competitions and was held in Omaha, Nebraska, at Johnny Rosenblatt Stadium as a double-elimination tournament. LSU claimed the championship for the third time.

== Realignment ==
- The Metro Conference dissolved, with its members moving primarily to Conference USA.
- Notre Dame departed the Midwestern Collegiate Conference for the Big East Conference, while Xavier and La Salle moved to the Atlantic 10 Conference.
- Fordham and Virginia Tech also joined the Atlantic 10, from the Patriot League and the Metro Conference, respectively.
- VCU joined the Colonial Athletic Association from the Metro Conference.
- Stephen F. Austin dissolved their baseball program. It would not resume until the 2006 season.

=== Format changes ===
- The Trans America Athletic Conference divided into three divisions of four teams each, the Eastern, Southern, and Western.
- The Big East divided into two divisions, named National and American.
- The Southland Conference divided into two divisions of four teams each, named Louisiana and Texas.

== Conference winners ==
This is a partial list of conference champions from the 1996 season. The NCAA sponsored regional competitions to determine the College World Series participants. Each of the eight regionals consisted of six teams competing in double-elimination tournaments, with the winners advancing to Omaha. In order to provide all conference champions with an automatic bid, 12 conference champions participated in a play-in round. The six winners joined the other 18 conference champions with automatic bids, 24 teams earned at-large selections.

Conference	Regular season winner	Conference Tournament	Tournament Venue • City	Tournament Winner
Atlantic Coast Conference	Florida State	1996 Atlantic Coast Conference baseball tournament	Durham Bulls Athletic Park • Durham, NC	Virginia
Big East Conference	American - West Virginia; National - Villanova	1996 Big East Conference baseball tournament	Muzzy Field • Bristol, CT	West Virginia
Big Eight Conference	Missouri	1996 Big Eight Conference baseball tournament	All Sports Stadium • Oklahoma City, OK	Oklahoma State
Big Ten Conference	Penn State	1996 Big Ten Conference baseball tournament	Beaver Field • State College, PA	Indiana
Big West Conference	Long Beach State	1996 Big West Conference baseball tournament	Titan Field • Fullerton, CA	UNLV
Colonial Athletic Association	Old Dominion/Richmond	1996 Colonial Athletic Association baseball tournament	Grainger Stadium • Kinston, NC	Old Dominion
Conference USA	South Florida	1996 Conference USA baseball tournament	Pete Taylor Park • Hattiesburg, MS	Tulane
Ivy League	Gehrig - Princeton; Rolfe - Harvard	1996 Ivy League Baseball Championship Series	Bill Clarke Field • Princeton, NJ	Princeton
Metro Atlantic Athletic Conference	Northern - Siena; Southern - Iona	1996 Metro Atlantic Athletic Conference baseball tournament	Heritage Park • Colonie, NY	Siena
Mid-American Conference	Kent State	1996 Mid-American Conference baseball tournament	Gene Michael Field • Kent, OH	Akron
Midwestern Collegiate Conference	Butler	1996 Midwestern Collegiate Conference baseball tournament	Bush Stadium • Indianapolis, IN	Northern Illinois
Mid-Continent Conference	Troy State	1996 Mid-Continent Conference baseball tournament	Riddle–Pace Field • Troy, AL	Northeastern Illinois
North Atlantic Conference	Delaware	1996 North Atlantic Conference baseball tournament	Mahoney Diamond • Orono, ME	Delaware
Northeast Conference	Rider/Monmouth	1996 Northeast Conference baseball tournament	Ewing Township, NJ	Rider
Pacific-10 Conference	North - Washington; South - Southern California	no tournament		
Patriot League	Bucknell	1996 Patriot League baseball tournament	Bucknell Field • Lewisburg, PA	Bucknell
Southeastern Conference	Eastern - Florida; Western - Alabama	1996 Southeastern Conference baseball tournament	Hoover Metropolitan Stadium • Hoover, AL	Alabama
Southern Conference	Georgia Southern	1996 Southern Conference baseball tournament	College Park • Charleston, SC	Georgia Southern
Southland Conference	Louisiana - Northeast Louisiana; Texas - Southwest Texas State	1996 Southland Conference baseball tournament	Fair Grounds Field • Shreveport, LA	Sam Houston State
Southwest Conference	Texas	1996 Southwest Conference baseball tournament	Dan Law Field • Lubbock, TX	Rice
Trans America Athletic Conference	Eastern - Georgia State; Southern - Stetson; Western - Jacksonville State	1996 Trans America Athletic Conference baseball tournament	Conrad Park • DeLand, FL	UCF
West Coast Conference	Santa Clara	No tournament		

== Conference standings ==
The following is an incomplete list of conference standings:

1996 Atlantic Coast Conference baseball standings
	Conf.				Overall
Team	W		L	PCT	W		L	PCT
No. 6 Florida State ‍†‍‍^{y}	19	–	5	.792	52	–	17	.754
No. 4 Clemson ‍‍‍^{y}	17	–	7	.708	51	–	17	.750
No. 18 Georgia Tech ‍‍‍^{y}	13	–	11	.542	40	–	24	.625
No. 28 NC State ‍‍‍^{y}	13	–	11	.542	42	–	19	.689
No. 19 Virginia ‍‍‡‍^{y}	11	–	13	.458	44	–	21	.677
North Carolina ‍‍‍	11	–	13	.458	33	–	25	.569
Duke ‍‍‍	9	–	14	.391	39	–	18	.684
Wake Forest ‍‍‍	7	–	16	.304	26	–	32	.448
Maryland ‍‍‍	7	–	17	.292	24	–	27	.471
† – Conference champion ‡ – Tournament champion y – Invited to the NCAA tournament As of June 30, 1996; Rankings from Collegiate Baseball

1996 Big East Conference baseball standings
	Conf.						Overall
Team	W		L		T	PCT	W		L		T	PCT
American Division
West Virginia ^{x}‍‍‡‍^{y}	15	–	10	–	0	.600	33	–	25	–	0	.569
Providence ^{x}‍‍‍	15	–	10	–	0	.600	32	–	17	–	1	.650
St. John's ‍‍‍	14	–	10	–	0	.583	26	–	18	–	0	.591
Connecticut ‍‍‍	13	–	12	–	0	.520	24	–	23	–	0	.511
Pittsburgh ‍‍‍	9	–	13	–	0	.409	24	–	20	–	2	.543
Boston College ‍‍‍	6	–	18	–	0	.250	15	–	27	–	0	.357
National Division
Villanova ^{x}‍‍‍	16	–	5	–	0	.762	25	–	20	–	0	.556
Rutgers ‍‍‍	15	–	7	–	1	.674	32	–	21	–	1	.602
Notre Dame ‍‍‍^{y}	13	–	7	–	0	.650	44	–	18	–	0	.710
Georgetown ‍‍‍	6	–	18	–	0	.250	18	–	34	–	0	.346
Seton Hall ‍‍‍	5	–	17	–	1	.239	18	–	27	–	1	.402
x – Division champion ‡ – Tournament champion y – Invited to the NCAA tournament As of June 30, 1996; Rankings from Collegiate Baseball

1996 Big Eight Conference baseball standings
	Conf.				Overall
Team	W		L	PCT	W		L	PCT
No. 29 Missouri ‍†‍‍^{y}	20	–	8	.714	39	–	19	.672
No. 8 Oklahoma State ‍‍‡‍^{y}	17	–	9	.654	45	–	21	.682
Oklahoma ‍‍‍	14	–	12	.538	32	–	25	.561
Iowa State ‍‍‍	12	–	14	.462	23	–	31	.426
Kansas State ‍‍‍	11	–	16	.407	28	–	26	.519
Kansas ‍‍‍	11	–	17	.393	26	–	30	.464
Nebraska ‍‍‍	8	–	17	.320	27	–	27	.500
† – Conference champion ‡ – Tournament champion y – Invited to the NCAA tournament As of June 30, 1996; Rankings from Collegiate Baseball

1996 Big Ten Conference baseball standings
	Conf.				Overall
Team	W		L	PCT	W		L	PCT
Penn State ‍†‍‍	19	–	8	.704	32	–	24	.571
Indiana ‍‍‡‍^{y}	18	–	8	.692	43	–	18	.705
Illinois ‍‍‍	17	–	10	.630	37	–	22	.627
Michigan ‍‍‍	17	–	11	.607	24	–	30	.444
Minnesota ‍‍‍	15	–	12	.556	30	–	26	.536
Ohio State ‍‍‍	15	–	13	.536	36	–	20	.643
Iowa ‍‍‍	13	–	13	.500	25	–	22	.532
Northwestern ‍‍‍	10	–	18	.357	26	–	29	.473
Purdue ‍‍‍	8	–	19	.296	22	–	32	.407
Michigan State ‍‍‍	4	–	24	.143	14	–	41	.255
x – Division champion ‡ – Tournament champion y – Invited to the NCAA tournament As of June 30, 1996; Rankings from Collegiate Baseball

1996 Big West Conference baseball standings
	Conf.				Overall
Team	W		L	PCT	W		L	PCT
Long Beach State ‍†‍‍	15	–	6	.714	34	–	26	.567
No. 26 UNLV ‍‍‡‍	14	–	7	.667	43	–	17	.717
UC Santa Barbara ‍‍‍	14	–	7	.667	32	–	20	.615
No. 13 Cal State Fullerton ‍‍‍	13	–	8	.619	42	–	16	.724
Nevada ‍‍‍	8	–	13	.381	28	–	18	.609
New Mexico State ‍‍‍	8	–	13	.381	25	–	27	.481
San Jose State ‍‍‍	7	–	14	.333	28	–	28	.500
Pacific ‍‍‍	5	–	16	.238	24	–	25	.490
† – Conference champion ‡ – Tournament champion y – Invited to the 1996 NCAA Division I baseball tournament As of June 30, 1996; Rankings from Collegiate Baseball

1996 Colonial Athletic Association baseball standings
	Conf.				Overall
Team	W		L	PCT	W		L	PCT
Old Dominion ‍†‍‡‍^{y}	13	–	7	.650	39	–	17	.696
Richmond ‍†‍‍	13	–	7	.650	27	–	25	.519
VCU ‍‍‍	11	–	7	.611	34	–	22	.607
George Mason ‍‍‍	12	–	9	.571	25	–	29	.463
East Carolina ‍‍‍	10	–	11	.476	22	–	24	.478
James Madison ‍‍‍	9	–	11	.450	34	–	25	.576
UNC Wilmington ‍‍‍	9	–	11	.450	28	–	30	.483
William & Mary ‍‍‍	2	–	16	.111	23	–	25	.479
† – Conference champion ‡ – Tournament champion y – Invited to the NCAA tournament As of June 30, 1996; Rankings from Collegiate Baseball

1996 Conference USA baseball standings
	Conf.				Overall
Team	W		L	PCT	W		L	PCT
South Florida ‍†‍‍^{y}	20	–	4	.833	47	–	19	.712
Tulane ‍‍‡‍^{y}	18	–	6	.750	43	–	20	.683
Southern Miss ‍‍‍	14	–	10	.583	32	–	28	.533
UAB ‍‍‍	13	–	11	.542	33	–	25	.569
Charlotte ‍‍‍	11	–	13	.458	29	–	30	.492
Memphis ‍‍‍	9	–	11	.450	26	–	28	.481
Saint Louis ‍‍‍	9	–	12	.429	25	–	24	.510
Louisville ‍‍‍	6	–	15	.286	18	–	36	.333
Cincinnati ‍‍‍	1	–	19	.050	5	–	34	.128
† – Conference champion ‡ – Tournament champion y – Invited to the NCAA tournament As of June 30, 1996; Rankings from Collegiate Baseball

1996 NCAA Division I baseball independents standings
	Conf.				Overall
Team	W		L	PCT	W		L	PCT
No. 2 Miami (FL) ‍‍‍^{y}		–		–	50	–	14	.781
Oral Roberts ‍‍‍		–		–	32	–	24	.571
Hawaii–Hilo ‍‍‍		–		–	14	–	31	.311
Wofford ‍‍‍		–		–	8	–	35	.186
Colgate ‍‍‍		–		–	3	–	20	.130
Southern Utah ‍‍‍		–		–		–		–
y – Invited to the NCAA tournament As of June 30, 1996; Rankings from Collegiate Baseball

1996 Ivy League baseball standings
	Conf.				Overall
Team	W		L	PCT	W		L	PCT
Lou Gehrig
Princeton ^{x}‍‍‡‍^{y}	13	–	7	.650	26	–	21	.553
Penn ‍‍‍	13	–	7	.650	25	–	17	.595
Cornell ‍‍‍	8	–	12	.400	17	–	27	.386
Columbia ‍‍‍	7	–	13	.350	13	–	29	.310
Red Rolfe
Harvard ^{x}‍‍‍	14	–	6	.700	23	–	17	.575
Yale ‍‍‍	11	–	9	.550	24	–	18	.571
Dartmouth ‍‍‍	8	–	12	.400	12	–	25	.324
Brown ‍‍‍	6	–	14	.300	12	–	25	.324
x – Division champion ‡ – Championship Series champion y – Invited to the NCAA tournament As of June 30, 1996; Rankings from Collegiate Baseball

1996 Metro Atlantic Athletic Conference baseball standings
	Conf.				Overall
Team	W		L	PCT	W		L	PCT
Northern
Siena ^{x}‍‍‡‍^{y}	14	–	4	.778	28	–	20	.583
Le Moyne ‍‍‍	10	–	8	.556	17	–	19	.472
Niagara ‍‍‍	7	–	11	.389	14	–	20	.412
Canisius ‍‍‍	5	–	13	.278	13	–	22	.371
Southern
Iona ^{x}‍‍‍	11	–	7	.611	26	–	21	.553
Saint Peter's ‍‍‍	10	–	7	.588	18	–	24	.429
Fairfield ‍‍‍	10	–	8	.556	20	–	19	.513
Manhattan ‍‍‍	4	–	13	.235	9	–	30	.231
x – Division champion ‡ – Tournament champion y – Invited to the NCAA tournament As of June 30, 1996; Rankings from Collegiate Baseball

1996 Mid-American Conference baseball standings
	Conf.						Overall
Team	W		L		T	PCT	W		L		T	PCT
Kent State ‍†‍‍	21	–	7	–	0	.750	30	–	20	–	0	.600
Ohio ‍‍‍	21	–	11	–	0	.656	34	–	23	–	0	.596
Toledo ‍‍‍	18	–	14	–	0	.563	27	–	27	–	0	.500
Akron ‍‍‡‍^{y}	18	–	14	–	0	.563	37	–	23	–	0	.617
Ball State ‍‍‍	16	–	14	–	0	.533	32	–	20	–	1	.613
Central Michigan ‍‍‍	16	–	14	–	0	.533	31	–	20	–	0	.608
Eastern Michigan ‍‍‍	16	–	16	–	0	.500	26	–	29	–	0	.473
Bowling Green ‍‍‍	14	–	17	–	0	.452	28	–	22	–	0	.560
Western Michigan ‍‍‍	10	–	21	–	0	.323	17	–	34	–	0	.333
Miami ‍‍‍	5	–	27	–	0	.156	12	–	40	–	0	.231
† – Conference champion ‡ – Tournament champion y – Invited to the NCAA tournament As of June 30, 1996; Rankings from Collegiate Baseball

1996 Mid-Continent Conference baseball standings
	Conf.						Overall
Team	W		L		T	PCT	W		L		T	PCT
East
Troy State ^{x}‍‍‍	16	–	2	–	0	.889	41	–	13	–	0	.759
Pace ‍‍‍	10	–	10	–	0	.500	20	–	28	–	0	.417
Youngstown State ‍‍‍	10	–	10	–	0	.500	20	–	25	–	0	.444
NYIT ‍‍‍	8	–	12	–	0	.400	20	–	25	–	0	.444
C.W. Post ‍‍‍	7	–	11	–	0	.389	15	–	24	–	1	.388
Central Connecticut ‍‍‍	7	–	13	–	0	.350	17	–	25	–	1	.407
West
Eastern Illinois ^{x}‍‍‍	15	–	3	–	0	.833	24	–	22	–	0	.522
Northeastern Illinois ‍‍‡‍^{y}	12	–	12	–	0	.500	31	–	29	–	0	.517
Valparaiso ‍‍‍	9	–	11	–	0	.450	18	–	29	–	0	.383
Western Illinois ‍‍‍	9	–	13	–	0	.409	14	–	27	–	0	.341
Chicago State ‍‍‍	7	–	13	–	0	.350	20	–	28	–	1	.418
‡ – Tournament champion y – Invited to the NCAA tournament As of June 30, 1996; Rankings from Collegiate Baseball

1996 Northeast Conference baseball standings
	Conf.						Overall
Team	W		L		T	PCT	W		L		T	PCT
Rider ‍†‍‡‍	15	–	6	–	0	.714	28	–	22	–	0	.560
Monmouth ‍†‍‍	15	–	6	–	0	.714	25	–	22	–	0	.532
St. Francis ‍‍‍	12	–	8	–	0	.600	21	–	20	–	1	.512
Long Island ‍‍‍	12	–	9	–	0	.571	21	–	19	–	0	.525
Fairleigh Dickinson ‍‍‍	9	–	12	–	0	.429	16	–	23	–	0	.410
Wagner ‍‍‍	8	–	12	–	0	.400	14	–	24	–	0	.368
Marist ‍‍‍	8	–	13	–	0	.381	16	–	24	–	1	.402
Mount St. Mary's ‍‍‍	4	–	17	–	0	.190	6	–	24	–	1	.210
† – Conference champion ‡ – Tournament champion y – Invited to the NCAA tournament Rankings from Collegiate Baseball

1996 Patriot League baseball standings
	Conf.						Overall
Team	W		L		T	PCT	W		L		T	PCT
Bucknell ‍†‍‡‍^{y}	14	–	6	–	0	.700	24	–	23	–	0	.511
Lehigh ‍‍‍	12	–	8	–	0	.600	18	–	20	–	1	.474
Navy ‍‍‍	11	–	9	–	0	.550	24	–	28	–	0	.462
Army ‍‍‍	9	–	11	–	0	.450	20	–	21	–	0	.488
Lafayette ‍‍‍	9	–	11	–	0	.450	12	–	28	–	0	.300
Holy Cross ‍‍‍	5	–	15	–	0	.250	7	–	26	–	0	.212
‡ – Tournament champion y – Invited to the NCAA tournament As of June 30, 1996; Rankings from Collegiate Baseball

1996 Southeastern Conference baseball standings
	Conf.				Overall
Team	W		L	PCT	W		L	PCT
Eastern Division
No. 3 Florida ^{x}‍†‍‍	20	–	10	.667	50	–	18	.735
No. 12 Tennessee ‍‍‍	18	–	12	.600	43	–	20	.683
Kentucky ‍‍‍	15	–	14	.517	35	–	24	.593
Vanderbilt ‍‍‍	14	–	16	.467	29	–	25	.537
South Carolina ‍‍‍	13	–	17	.433	25	–	28	.472
Georgia ‍‍‍	8	–	21	.276	24	–	30	.444
Western Division
No. 5 Alabama ^{x}‍†‍‡‍	20	–	10	.667	50	–	19	.725
No. 1 LSU ^{x}‍†‍‍	20	–	10	.667	52	–	15	.776
No. 27 Mississippi State ‍‍‍	17	–	13	.567	38	–	24	.613
Arkansas ‍‍‍	15	–	15	.500	39	–	20	.661
Auburn ‍‍‍	12	–	18	.400	32	–	24	.571
Ole Miss ‍‍‍	7	–	23	.233	24	–	30	.444
x – Division champion † – Conference champion ‡ – Tournament champion y – Invited to the NCAA tournament As of June 30, 1996; Rankings from Collegiate Baseball

1996 Southern Conference baseball standings
	Conf.				Overall
Team	W		L	PCT	W		L	PCT
No. 14 Georgia Southern ^{†‡y} ‍‍‍	17	–	3	.850	46	–	14	.767
Western Carolina ‍‍‍	17	–	7	.708	32	–	24	.571
Furman ‍‍‍	15	–	9	.625	26	–	29	.473
The Citadel ‍‍‍	13	–	10	.565	33	–	26	.559
Appalachian State ‍‍‍	12	–	10	.545	27	–	19	.587
East Tennessee State ‍‍‍	11	–	12	.478	26	–	24	.520
VMI ‍‍‍	7	–	16	.304	17	–	29	.370
Davidson ‍‍‍	6	–	18	.250	16	–	33	.327
Marshall ‍‍‍	4	–	17	.190	7	–	35	.167
† – Conference champion ‡ – SoCon Tournament champion y – Invited to the NCAA tournament As of June 30, 1996; Rankings from Collegiate Baseball

1996 Southland Conference baseball standings
	Conf.				Overall
Team	W		L	PCT	W		L	PCT
Louisiana
Northeast Louisiana ^{x}‍‍‍	21	–	9	.700	41	–	19	.683
Northwestern State ‍‍‍	14	–	16	.467	34	–	27	.557
Nicholls State ‍‍‍	11	–	19	.367	17	–	36	.321
McNeese State ‍‍‍	10	–	20	.333	23	–	31	.426
Texas
Southwest Texas State ^{x}‍‍‍	19	–	11	.633	27	–	32	.458
Texas–San Antonio ‍‍‍	17	–	13	.567	26	–	26	.500
Sam Houston State ‍‍‡‍^{y}	15	–	15	.500	31	–	29	.517
Texas–Arlington ‍‍‍	13	–	17	.433	23	–	35	.397
x – Division champion ‡ – Tournament champion y – Invited to the NCAA tournament As of June 30, 1996; Rankings from Collegiate Baseball

1996 Southwest Conference baseball standings
	Conf.				Overall
Team	W		L	PCT	W		L	PCT
No. 16 Texas ‍†‍‍^{y}	17	–	7	.708	39	–	24	.619
No. 17 Texas Tech ‍‍‍^{y}	15	–	9	.625	49	–	15	.766
Texas A&M ‍‍‍	12	–	12	.500	37	–	21	.638
Baylor ‍‍‍	11	–	13	.458	32	–	27	.542
Texas Christian ‍‍‍	11	–	13	.458	34	–	33	.507
Houston ‍‍‍	9	–	15	.375	29	–	28	.509
No. 25 Rice ‍‍‡‍^{y}	9	–	15	.375	42	–	23	.646
† – Conference champion ‡ – Tournament champion y – Invited to the NCAA tournament As of June 30, 1996; Rankings from Collegiate Baseball

1996 Trans America Athletic Conference baseball standings
	Conf.				Overall
Team	W		L	PCT	W		L	PCT
South
No. 22 Stetson ^{x}‍†‍‍^{y}	12	–	6	.667	42	–	23	.646
UCF ‍‍‡‍^{y}	9	–	9	.500	43	–	22	.662
Florida Atlantic ‍‍‍	9	–	9	.500	39	–	23	.629
FIU ‍‍‍	6	–	12	.333	35	–	24	.593
East
Georgia State ^{x}‍†‍‍	12	–	6	.667	21	–	32	.396
Campbell ‍‍‍	9	–	9	.500	23	–	33	.411
College of Charleston ‍‍‍	8	–	10	.444	28	–	23	.549
Mercer ‍‍‍	7	–	11	.389	25	–	30	.455
West
Jacksonville State ^{x}‍†‍‍	12	–	6	.667	33	–	18	.647
Southeastern Louisiana ‍‍‍	11	–	7	.611	34	–	24	.586
Centenary ‍‍‍	7	–	11	.389	23	–	34	.404
Samford ‍‍‍	6	–	12	.333	22	–	34	.393
x – Division champion † – Conference champion ‡ – Tournament champion y – Invited to the NCAA tournament As of June 30, 1996; Rankings from Collegiate Baseball

== College World Series ==
The 1996 season marked the fiftieth NCAA baseball tournament, which culminated with the eight team College World Series. The College World Series was held in Omaha, Nebraska. The eight teams played a double-elimination format, with LSU claiming their third championship with a 9–8 win over Miami (FL) in the final.

=== Bracket ===
First round	Second round
1	Alabama	7
8	Oklahoma State	5
1	Alabama	1
5	Miami (FL)	15
4	Clemson	3
5	Miami (FL)	7
Bracket One
8	Oklahoma State	5
4	Clemson	8^{10}
1	Alabama	13
4	Clemson	14
2	Florida	5
7	Florida State	2
2	Florida	4
6	LSU	9
3	Wichita State	8
6	LSU	9
Bracket Two
7	Florida State	8
3	Wichita State	4
2	Florida	6
7	Florida State	3

Semifinals
5	Miami (FL)	14	—
4	Clemson	5	—
6	LSU	2	—
2	Florida	1	—

Finals
5	Miami (FL)	8
6	LSU	9
