= Las Vegas Wranglers (baseball) =

Minor league baseball team, 1947–1958

- 1947–1958; (1947–1952, 1957–1958); Las Vegas, Nevada

Minor league affiliations
- Previous classes: Class C (1947–1952, 1957–1958)
- Previous leagues: California League (1958); Arizona–Mexico League (1957); Southwest International League (1951–1952); Sunset League (1947–1950)

Major league affiliations
- Previous teams: Pittsburgh Pirates (1958); Boston Braves (1947)

Minor league titles
- League titles: 1 (1949)

Team data
- Previous names: Las Vegas Pirates (1958)
- Previous parks: Elks Stadium (1948–1952, 1957–1958); Park @ Las Vegas Boulevard & Bonanza Avenue (1947)

The Las Vegas Wranglers were a minor league baseball team that played in various leagues in the 1940s and 1950s. They were Las Vegas's first professional team in any sport.

== 1947 ==
The Wranglers were a charter franchise of the Class C Sunset League in 1947. Despite Paul Zaby's league-leading .402 batting average and a historic offensive season from Calvin Felix, the Wranglers (a Boston Braves affiliate) finished just 73-67, third place, and were beaten in the semifinals by the Riverside Dons. Ex-major leaguer Newt Kimball was Las Vegas's player-manager, also winning 14 games as a pitcher that year.

The 21-year-old Felix led the league in nearly every offensive category in 1947, including 52 home runs, the second-most ever hit in a pro league by such a young player. (Tony Lazzeri, also then 21, hit 60 home runs for the Salt Lake City Bees in 1925, but that team played 200 games). Felix was sold to the Triple-A Hollywood Stars of the Pacific Coast League after the season but never played for them. Instead, he wound up with the unaffiliated Denver Bears of the Western League in 1948 and with the Santa Barbara Dodgers in 1949. By 1953, Felix was with the Triple-A Montreal Royals, but was sent down to the Texas League the next season. He never played in the majors.

Actor Cameron Mitchell pitched one game for the Wranglers in 1947. Las Vegas, needing all the pitching help they could get in the offense-minded Sunset League, signed Mitchell after he shut out the Triple-A Los Angeles Angels for four innings in an exhibition game. However, the actor was shelled, allowing 11 runs in less than an inning to the Ontario Orioles.

== Later years ==
Las Vegas continued to be one of the circuit's top teams the next three years. In 1948, the Wranglers moved up to second place and made to the championship series before losing to Reno. However, the team drew only around 600 fans per game (Las Vegas' population was only around 20,000 then) and faced a $15,000 deficit at season's end, partially because they were no longer affiliated with the Braves. In 1949, however, the Wranglers blew the league away with an 88-38 record and easily claimed the pennant, with attendance climbing to over 1,000 per contest. Due to budget cuts, there were no playoffs that year, and the '49 Wranglers had claimed Las Vegas' first pro sports championship (and last one for 37 years, until the Las Vegas Stars won the Pacific Coast League (PCL) crown in 1986). After a third-place finish in 1950, the top teams in the Sunset League merged with the Arizona–Mexico League to form the new Southwest International League in 1951.

Declining attendance vexed minor-league ball throughout the country in the early 1950s, and Las Vegas was no exception: despite two more winning seasons in 1951–52, the Wranglers (along with the rest of the SWIL) died after the 1952 season.

Baseball returned to Las Vegas in 1957, but the new team (also called the Wranglers) finished fourth in the Arizona–Mexico League, then folded. On May 26, 1958, however, the San Jose Pirates of the California League moved to Las Vegas, renaming themselves the Wranglers. But the team finished a poor seventh and disbanded after the season when the league contracted from eight teams to six.

Las Vegas would not have another professional baseball team for a quarter-century, until the Las Vegas Stars joined the PCL in 1983.

== Notable alumni ==
- Ron Brand (1958)
- Tom Butters (1958)
- Jim Campbell (1958)
- Larry Foss (1958)
- Bob Lee (1958) MLB All-Star
- Elmo Plaskett (1958)
- Bob Veale (1958) two-time MLB All-Star; 1964 NL Strikeout Leader
- Bill Koski (1957)
- Frank Gabler (1951)
- Ed Wheeler (1950)
- Newt Kimball (1947, 1951 manager)
- Cameron Mitchell (1947) actor, pitched 1 game.

== Year-by-year record ==
Year	League	Record	Finish	Manager	Playoffs	
1947	Sunset League	73-67	3rd	Newt Kimball	Lost in first round	
1948	Sunset League	78-62	2nd	Ken Meyers	Lost League Finals	
1949	Sunset League	88-38	1st	Ken Meyers	none League Champs	
1950	Sunset League	76-69	3rd	Ed Wheeler	Lost in first round	
1951	Southwest International League	72-71	5th	Newt Kimball		
1952	Southwest International League	70-66	3rd	William DeCarlo	none	
1957	Arizona–Mexico League	62-74	4th	Red Marion	none	
1958	California League	54-81 overall	7th	Jack Paepke		San Jose moved to Las Vegas May 26
