= Sunset League =

Minor league baseball circuit that operated in North America, 1947–50

- Most recent season or competition: 1950 Sunset League season
- Classification: Class C (1947–1950)
- Sport: Minor League Baseball
- First season: 1947
- Folded: 1950
- Replaced by: Southwest International League
- President: W.R. Bill Schroeder (1947); Les Powers (1948–1950)
- No. of teams: 13
- Country: Mexico; United States of America
- Most titles: 1 Anaheim Valencias (1947); Reno Silver Sox (1948); Las Vegas Wranglers (1949); El Centro Imperials (1950)
- Related competitions: Arizona–Texas League

The Sunset League was a minor league baseball circuit that operated from 1947 through 1950.

The Sunset League was a Class C level league, with franchises based in the United States and Mexico. The league expanded from six to eight teams from 1949 to 1950. There was a previous league called the "Sunset League" that briefly played in Texas in the 1902 season.

For the 1951 season, the circuit merged with the Arizona–Texas League to form the Southwest International League.

== History ==
In 1902, a "Sunset League" included Beaumont (8–4), Lake Charles (7–6), Crowley (6–6) and Houston (3–8). Records are from the May 27, 1902, Houston Daily Post and are not official.

The Sunset League was one of many short–lived minor leagues of the late 1940s and early 1950s. The Class C level circuit ran from 1947 through 1950. Las Vegas, El Centro and Riverside were members every year. It was an extremely high offensive league; in 1947, Las Vegas averaged 9 runs a game and finished 73–67. The league merged with the Arizona-Texas League in 1951 to form the Southwest International League.

== Cities represented ==
- Anaheim, CA: Anaheim Valencias (1947); Anaheim/San Bernardino Valencias (1948)
- El Centro, CA: El Centro Imperials (1947–1950)
- Las Vegas, NV: Las Vegas Wranglers (1947–1950)
- Mexicali, Baja California: Mexicali Eagles (1948–1949)
- Ontario, CA: Ontario Orioles (1947)
- Porterville, CA: Porterville Packers (1949–1950)
- Reno, NV: Reno Silver Sox (1947–1949)
- Riverside, CA: Riverside Dons (1947; 1949); Riverside Rubes (1948; 1950)
- Salinas, CA: Salinas Colts (1949)
- San Bernardino, CA: San Bernardino Pioneers (1949–1950)
- Tijuana, Baja CA: Tijuana Potros (1949–1950)
- Yuma, AZ: Yuma Panthers (1950)

== Standings and statistics ==
=== 1947 to 1948 ===
1947 Sunset League

| Team standings | W | L | PCT | GB | Attend | Managers |
|---|---|---|---|---|---|---|
| Riverside Dons | 80 | 60 | .571 | – | 45,477 | Norman DeWeese / Jack Rothrock |
| Anaheim Valencias | 79 | 61 | .564 | 1 | 16,452 | Jack Rothrock / Jerry Gardner |
| Las Vegas Wranglers | 73 | 67 | .521 | 7 | 44,574 | Newt Kimball |
| Reno Silver Sox | 69 | 69 | .500 | 10 | 22,866 | Thomas Lloyd |
| Ontario Orioles | 64 | 75 | .460 | 15½ | 23,932 | Hal Spindel |
| El Centro Imperials | 53 | 86 | .381 | 26½ | 45,429 | Bob Boken / Ray Viers |

Playoffs: Riverside 3 games, Las Vegas 0; Anaheim 3 games, Ontario 0.
Finals: Anaheim 4 games, Riverside 1.

Player statistics
| Player | Team | Stat | Tot | Player | Team | Stat | Tot |
|---|---|---|---|---|---|---|---|
| Paul Zaby | Las Vegas | BA | .401 | Clarence Jaime | Ontario | W | 22 |
| Calvin Felix | Las Vegas | Runs | 173 | Don Robertson | Reno | SO | 242 |
| Calvin Felix | Las Vegas | Hits | 236 | Robert Masters | Riverside | ERA | 3.55 |
| Calvin Felix | Las Vegas | RBI | 182 | Don Tisnerat | Anaheim | PCT | .765 13–4 |
| Calvin Felix | Las Vegas | HR | 52 | | | | |
| Calvin Felix | Las Vegas | TB | 443 | | | | |

1948 Sunset League
schedule

| Team standings | W | L | PCT | GB | Attend | Managers |
|---|---|---|---|---|---|---|
| Mexicali Aguilas | 81 | 59 | .579 | – | 68,567 | Dominic Castro / Dick Wilson |
| Las Vegas Wranglers | 78 | 62 | .557 | 3 | 41,748 | Ken Meyers |
| Reno Silver Sox | 77 | 63 | .550 | 4 | 34,325 | Thomas Lloyd |
| Riverside Rubes | 74 | 66 | .529 | 7 | 52,199 | George Caster / Henry Bartolomei |
| El Centro Imperials | 67 | 73 | .479 | 14 | 42,221 | Ray Viers |
| Anaheim Valencias / San Bernardino Valencias | 43 | 97 | .307 | 38 | 21,760 | Jerry Gardner / Claude "Bob" Williams |

Anaheim (13–42) moved to San Bernardino June 25.
Playoffs: Reno 3 games, Mexicali 0; Las Vegas 3 games, Riverside 1.
Finals: Reno 3 games, Las Vegas 2.

Player statistics
| Player | Team | Stat | Tot | Player | Team | Stat | Tot |
|---|---|---|---|---|---|---|---|
| Bobby Balcena | Mexicali | BA | .369 | Al Corwin | Reno | W | 26 |
| Don Barclay | Reno | Runs | 171 | Robert Schulte | Riverside | SO | 276 |
| Don Jameson | Riverside | Hits | 202 | Manuel Echeverria | Mexicali | ERA | 2.83 |
| Dick Wilson | Mexicali | RBI | 188 | Manuel Echeverria | Mexicali | PCT | .875 14–2 |
| Dick Wilson | Mexicali | HR | 42 | | | | |

=== 1949 to 1950 ===
1949 Sunset League
schedule

| Team standings | W | L | PCT | GB | Attend | Managers |
|---|---|---|---|---|---|---|
| Las Vegas Wranglers | 88 | 38 | .698 | – | 61,050 | Ken Meyers |
| Mexicali Aguilas | 79 | 47 | .627 | 9 | 59,810 | Ed Wheeler |
| San Bernardino Pioneers | 62 | 64 | .492 | 26 | 35,871 | Jack Rothrock |
| Porterville Packers | 61 | 65 | .484 | 27 | 66,280 | Thomas Lloyd |
| El Centro Imperials | 59 | 66 | .472 | 28½ | 34,957 | Ray Viers / Frank Stinson |
| Salinas Colts/ Tijuana Potros | 58 | 68 | .460 | 30 | 39,701 | Bruce Ogrodowski |
| Reno Silver Sox | 49 | 75 | .395 | 38 | 37,780 | Lilio Marcucci |
| Riverside Dons | 46 | 79 | .368 | 41½ | 32,450 | Don Jameson |

Salinas moved to Tijuana August 5.
No playoffs held

Player statistics
| Player | Team | Stat | Tot | Player | Team | Stat | Tot |
|---|---|---|---|---|---|---|---|
| Frosty Kennedy | Riverside | BA | .411 | Eugene Roenspie | San Bernardino | W | 20 |
| Pete Hughes | Las Vegas | Runs | 156 | Warren Kanagy | Riverside/San Bern | SO | 210 |
| Frosty Kennedy | Riverside | Hits | 194 | Erwin Coutts | Mexicali | ERA | 2.69 |
| Bobby Balcena | Mexicali | RBI | 132 | Bob Shore | Las Vegas | PCT | .850 17–3 |
| Pete Hughes | Las Vegas | HR | 24 | | | | |
| Pete Hughes | Las Vegas | BB | 210 | | | | |

1950 Sunset League
schedule

| Team standings | W | L | PCT | GB | Attend | Managers |
|---|---|---|---|---|---|---|
| Mexicali Eagles | 98 | 47 | .676 | – | 80,871 | Dolf Luque |
| El Centro Imperials | 85 | 58 | .595 | 12 | 46,380 | Ken Meyers |
| Las Vegas Wranglers | 76 | 69 | .524 | 22 | 39,415 | Ed Wheeler |
| Riverside Rubes | 73 | 72 | .503 | 23 | 49,270 | Ray Viers |
| Tijuana Potros | 70 | 77 | .476 | 29 | 39,250 | Zenon Ochoa / Eugene Fernandez / Butch Moran |
| San Bernardino Pioneers | 65 | 80 | .448 | 33 | 28,250 | Frank Demaree / Gerald Waitman |
| Yuma Panthers | 62 | 83 | .428 | 36 | 50,101 | Butch Moran / Frank Gabler |
| Porterville Packers | 52 | 95 | .354 | 47 | 50,213 | Thomas Lloyd / Bill Harris / Joe Gonzales |

Playoffs: Mexicali 2 games, Las Vegas 1; El Centro 2 games, Riverside 1.
Finals: El Centro 2 games, Mexicali 1.

Player statistics
| Player | Team | Stat | Tot | Player | Team | Stat | Tot |
|---|---|---|---|---|---|---|---|
| Pete Hughes | El Centro | BA | .393 | Manuel Echeverria | Mexicali | W | 28 |
| Manuel Serrano | Mexicali | Runs | 153 | Manuel Echeverria | Mexicali | SO | 333 |
| Blas Guzman | Mexicali | Hits | 216 | Manuel Echeverria | Mexicali | ERA | 2.74 |
| Blas Guzman | Mexicali | RBI | 138 | Manuel Echeverria | Mexicali | IP | 328 |
| Ron D. Johnson | Las Vegas | HR | 26 | Nate Moreland | El Centro/Mexicali | PCT | .813 13–3 |

== Championship teams ==
- 1947 – Anaheim Valencias
- 1948 – Reno Silver Sox
- 1949 – Las Vegas Wranglers *
- 1950 – El Centro Imperials

* Playoffs were not played
