= Big East Conference Baseball Coach of the Year =

Big East Conference Baseball Coaching Staff of the Year
- Previous: Big East Conference Baseball Coach of the Year (1985–2015)
- Awarded for: Most outstanding baseball coaching staff in the Big East Conference
- Country: United States
- First award: 1985 (as "Coach of the Year"); 2016 (as "Coaching Staff of the Year")
- Currently held by: Creighton (Ed Servais, head coach)

The Big East Conference Baseball Coaching Staff of the Year award is presented annually to the conference's most outstanding coaching staff, as voted by the conference's head coaches at the end of each regular season.

The award was Big East Conference Baseball Coach of the Year, honoring only the head coach, from the first season of Big East Conference baseball in 1985 through the 2015 season. Starting with the 2016 season, the award was renamed the "Coaching Staff of the Year" award, honoring an entire staff. While the "Big East" name has been used by two separate conferences—the original Big East, which operated from 1979 to 2013, and the current Big East, formed when the original conference split in 2013—the current Big East claims the baseball history of the original conference.

The Big East is the only NCAA Division I baseball conference that presents an annual coaching award to an entire staff instead of only the head coach, although the head coach is cited by name in the award announcement.

In the 2014 season, Creighton's Ed Servais won the new conference's inaugural award. Creighton had a 30–16 (14–4 Big East) regular season to win the conference title. Since the formation of the current Big East, all but three of the honorees have won at least a share of the conference's regular season title, although two recent awards (2022 and 2023) were won by teams that finished outside the top two in the conference. From 1999 to 2006, by contrast, only two regular-season champions won the award.

Ed Blankmeyer of St. John's has won the award a record six times as an individual, and is one of two head coaches, along with Servais, to have been part of an honored staff twice. This includes back-to-back awards twice—individually in 2007 and 2008 and as part of the staff in 2017 and 2018, a feat matched only by his Red Storm predecessor Joe Russo (1990 and 1991) and UConn's Jim Penders (2010 and 2011). Blankmeyer, Penders, and Servais are the only head coaches to have won the award as individuals and as part of an honored staff; Penders has three individual awards and one staff award, while Servais has one individual award and two staff awards.

Providence is the only school to have three coaches win the award (Don Mezzanotte in 1986, Paul Kostacopoulos in 1995, and Charlie Hickey in 1999). Three other schools had multiple coaches win the award before 2016: St. John's (Russo and Blankmeyer), UConn (Andy Baylock and Penders), and Pittsburgh (Mark Jackson and Joe Jordano).

== Winners ==
=== By season ===
==== Coach of the Year ====
| Season | Coach | School | Conf. (Rk.) | Overall |
|---|---|---|---|---|
| 1985 | Mike Sheppard | Seton Hall | 15–3 (1st, South) | 44–19–1 |
| 1986 | Don Mezzanotte | Providence | 11–7 (T-1st, North) | 28–23 |
| 1987 | Mike Sheppard (2) | Seton Hall | 16–2 (1st, South) | 45–10 |
| 1988 | George Bennett | Villanova | 16–2 (1st, South) | 32–22 |
| 1989 | Mike Sheppard (3) | Seton Hall | 16–2 (1st, South) | 33–19–1 |
| 1990 | Joe Russo | St. John's | 15–6 (2nd) | 29–18 |
| 1991 | Joe Russo (2) | St. John's | 18–2 (1st) | 34–14–1 |
| 1992 | Andy Baylock | UConn | 13–7 (3rd) | 25–20–1 |
| 1993 | George Bennett (2) | Villanova | 14–7 (1st) | 27–15–1 |
| 1994 | Mark Jackson | Pittsburgh | 16–5 (1st) | 31–16 |
| 1995 | Paul Kostacopoulos | Providence | 16–5 (1st) | 44–15 |
| 1996 | Ed Blankmeyer | St. John's | 14–10 (3rd, American) | 26–18 |
| 1997 | Greg Van Zant | West Virginia | 17–7 (1st, American) | 36–19 |
| 1998 | Fred Hill | Rutgers | 17–3 (1st) | 33–16 |
| 1999 | Charlie Hickey | Providence | 18–8 (3rd) | 49–16 |
| 2000 | Pete Hughes | Boston College | 12–11 (5th) | 35–20 |
| 2001 | Paul Mainieri | Notre Dame | 22–4 (1st) | 49–13 |
| 2002 | Pete Hughes (2) | Boston College | 15–11 (T-3rd) | 30–25 |
| 2003 | Greg Van Zant (2) | West Virginia | 18–6 (2nd) | 36–19 |
| 2004 | Joe Jordano | Pittsburgh | 17–9 (T-2nd) | 38–18 |
| 2005 | Ed Blankmeyer (2) | St. John's | 19–4 (1st) | 41–18 |
| 2006 | Jim Penders | UConn | 18–6 (2nd) | 39–18–1 |
| 2007 | Ed Blankmeyer (3) | St. John's | 20–7 (T-1st) | 41–19 |
| 2008 | Ed Blankmeyer (4) | St. John's | 20–7 (1st) | 42–16 |
| 2009 | Lelo Prado | South Florida | 18–9 (2nd) | 34–25 |
| 2010 | Jim Penders (2) | UConn | 20–6 (2nd) | 48–16 |
| 2011 | Jim Penders (3) | UConn | 22–5 (1st) | 45–20 |
| 2012 | Ed Blankmeyer (5) | St. John's | 18–9 (T-1st) | 40–23 |
| 2013 | Joe Jordano (2) | Pittsburgh | 18–6 (T-2nd) | 42–17 |
| 2014 | Ed Servais | Creighton | 14–4 (1st) | 32–17 |
| 2015 | Ed Blankmeyer (6) | St. John's | 14–3 (1st) | 41–16 |

==== Coaching Staff of the Year ====
| Season | School | Head coach | Conf. (Rk.) | Overall |
|---|---|---|---|---|
| 2016 | Xavier | Scott Googins | 14–4 (1st) | 30–28 |
| 2017 | St. John's | Ed Blankmeyer (7) | 13–5 (2nd) | 42–13 |
| 2018 | St. John's (2) | Ed Blankmeyer (8) | 15–3 (1st) | 38–14 |
| 2019 | Creighton | Ed Servais (2) | 14–4 (1st) | 41–12 |
| 2020 | Season cancelled due to the COVID-19 pandemic | | | |
| 2021 | UConn | Jim Penders (4) | 13–4 (1st) | 30–16 |
| 2022 | Georgetown | Edwin Thompson | 11–10 (4th) | 32–24 |
| 2023 | Seton Hall | Rob Sheppard | 13–8 (3rd) | 31–24 |
| 2024 | St. John's (3) | Mike Hampton | 14–7 (2nd) | 34–16–1 |
| 2025 | Creighton (2) | Ed Servais (3) | 17–4 (1st) | |
| 2026 | St. John's (4) | Mike Hampton (2) | 15–6 (1st) | 30–24 |

=== By school ===
The following is a table of the schools whose coaches or coaching staffs have won the award, along with the year each school joined the conference, the number of times it has won the award, and the years in which it has done so.

All years reflect baseball seasons. For schools that joined the Big East after it first sponsored baseball, the first season of play takes place in the calendar year after officially joining the conference.

| School (year joined) | Total awards | Seasons (individual) | Seasons (staff) |
|---|---|---|---|
| St. John's (1985) | 12 | 1990, 1991, 1996, 2005, 2007, 2008, 2012, 2015 | 2017, 2018, 2024, 2026 |
| UConn (1985/2021) (Note: When the Big East split into two conferences after the 2013 season, UConn remained in the football-sponsoring league, the American Athletic Conference. It returned to the Big East after the 2020 season.) | 5 | 1992, 2006, 2010, 2011 | 2021 |
| Seton Hall (1985) | 4 | 1985, 1987, 1989 | 2023 |
| Creighton (2014) | 3 | 2014 | 2019, 2025 |
| Pittsburgh (1985) (Note: Pittsburgh left to join the Atlantic Coast Conference following the 2013 season.) | 3 | 1994, 2004, 2013 | — |
| Providence (1985) (Note: Providence cut its baseball program after the 1999 season.) | 3 | 1986, 1995, 1999 | — |
| Boston College (1985) (Note: Boston College left for the Atlantic Coast Conference following the 2005 season.) | 2 | 2000, 2002 | — |
| Villanova (1985) | 2 | 1988, 1993 | — |
| West Virginia (1996) (Note: West Virginia left to join the Big 12 Conference following the 2012 season.) | 2 | 1997, 2003 | — |
| Georgetown (1985) | 1 | — | 2022 |
| Notre Dame (1996) (Note: Notre Dame left to join the Atlantic Coast Conference following the 2013 season.) | 1 | 2001 | — |
| Rutgers (1996) (Note: When the Big East split into two conferences after the 2013 season, Rutgers remained in the football-sponsoring league, the American Athletic Conference. A year later, Rutgers moved to the Big Ten Conference.) | 1 | 1998 | — |
| South Florida (2006) (Note: When the Big East split into two conferences after the 2013 season, South Florida remained in the football-sponsoring league, the American Athletic Conference, where it remains today.) | 1 | 2009 | — |
| Xavier (2014) | 1 | — | 2016 |
