= Starkfield =

Starkfield can refer to:

- Starkfield, a fictional Massachusetts town in the novel Ethan Frome
- Stark Field, professional-size baseball field located in El Centro, California
