= Chris Heintz =

Chris Heintz may refer to:

- Chris Heintz (baseball)
- Chris Heintz (aeronautical engineer)
