= El Centro Imperials =

- 1947–2009; (1947–1952, 1995, 2009); El Centro, California
Team logo
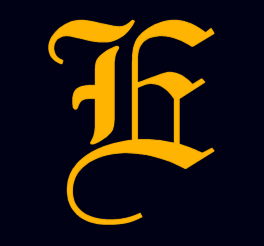
Cap insignia

Minor league affiliations
- Previous classes: Independent; C (1947–1952)
- League: Arizona Summer League (2009)
- Previous leagues: Golden State League (1995); Southwest International League (1951–1952); Sunset League (1947–1950)

Minor league titles
- League titles: 1950

Team data
- Previous names: El Centro Imperials (2009–2010); Imperial Valley Brahmas (1995); El Centro Imps (1952); El Centro Imperials (1947–1951)
- Previous parks: Desert Sun Stadium (2009); Ed Wiest Field (1995); Stark Field (1947–1952)

The El Centro Imperials was an independent professional baseball team based out of El Centro, California. The team started play in 1947 in the Sunset League and was folded in 1952. Another team, the Imperial Valley Brahmas played in El Centro in 1995 as part of the Golden State League and the Imperials were revived on April 3, 2009, as one of the four charter members of the new Arizona Summer League, an instructional summer professional baseball league affiliated with the Golden Baseball League. That version of the team was managed by former Los Angeles Dodgers player Mike Marshall, but lasted just the one season.

== Team history ==
The Imperials began as a minor league baseball team with the Sunset League from 1947 to 1950 and then the Southwest International League in 1951 and 1952 (the team shortened their name to the "Imps" in 1952). They played their home games at Stark Field in El Centro.

They won the Sunset League championship in 1950 before moving to the Southwest League, but were the worst team in the Southwest League in 1952. They went 28-47-1 before withdrawing from the league on July 13. The club did not have past or future major-leaguers on their roster during the campaign.

On April 3, 2009, the Imperials were revived and were named one of four charter teams in the Golden Baseball League's newest instructional league, the Arizona Summer League. They played their home games at Stark Field in El Centro, while most other teams played theirs at Desert Sun Stadium in Yuma, Arizona.

== Honored by the Scorpions ==
In 2008, the Imperials were honored by the GBL's Yuma Scorpions by having four games played at Stark Field during the season as Scorpions home games. The team donned special throwback uniforms of the Imperials. The last game was an 11-7 loss to the Chico Outlaws on August 27.

== Year-by-year record ==
Sunset League (1947–1950) / Southwest International League (1951–1952)

Year	Record	Finish	Manager	Playoffs
1947	53-86	6th	Bob Boken / Ray Viers	
1948	67-73	5th	Ray Viers	
1949	59-66	5th	Ray Viers / Frank Stinson	none
1950	85-58	2nd	Ken Meyers	League Champs
1951	59-86	9th	Red Kress / Bud Beringhele	
1952	N/A	N/A	Bud Beringhele	

Arizona Summer League (2009):

Season	W	L	Win %	Place	Playoff
2009	7	7	.467	2nd	No playoffs.
