= San Bernardino Pioneers =

- 1947–1950; San Bernardino, California

Minor league affiliations
- Previous classes: Class C
- League: Sunset League

Minor league titles
- League titles: 1947

Team data
- Previous names: San Bernardino Pioneers (1949–1950); San Bernardino Valencias (1948); Anaheim Valencias (1947–1948)
- Previous parks: Fiscalini Field; La Palma Park

The San Bernardino Pioneers were a minor league baseball team, that played in the Sunset League from 1947 to 1950.

They originated as the Anaheim Valencias and were located in Anaheim, California. The team won the 1947 Sunset League championship, four games to one over the Riverside Dons. On June 25, 1948, they moved to San Bernardino, California and the following season became the Pioneers. Baseball would not return to Anaheim until the California Angels of Major League Baseball moved there in 1966.
