= 2021 American Athletic Conference baseball tournament =

American college baseball tournament

- Teams: 8
- Format: Double-elimination tournament
- Finals site: BayCare Ballpark; Clearwater, Florida
- Champions: South Florida (1st title)
- Winning coach: Billy Mohl (1st title)
- MVP: Daniel Cantu (South Florida)
- Television: ESPN+

2021 American Athletic Conference baseball standings
| | Conf. | | | | Overall |
| Team | W | | L | PCT | W | | L | PCT |
|---|---|---|---|---|---|---|---|---|
| No. 12 East Carolina ‍†‍‍^{y} | 20 | – | 8 | .714 | 44 | – | 17 | .721 |
| Tulane ‍‍‍ | 17 | – | 10 | .630 | 31 | – | 24 | .564 |
| Wichita State ‍‍‍ | 18 | – | 13 | .581 | 31 | – | 23 | .574 |
| Cincinnati ‍‍‍ | 18 | – | 14 | .563 | 29 | – | 26 | .527 |
| UCF ‍‍‍ | 18 | – | 14 | .563 | 31 | – | 30 | .508 |
| South Florida ‍‍‡‍^{y} | 14 | – | 14 | .500 | 31 | – | 30 | .508 |
| Houston ‍‍‍ | 7 | – | 21 | .250 | 19 | – | 34 | .358 |
| Memphis ‍‍‍ | 7 | – | 25 | .219 | 18 | – | 39 | .316 |
† – Conference champion ‡ – Tournament champion y – Invited to the NCAA tournament As of June 13, 2021; Rankings from D1Baseball

The 2021 American Athletic Conference baseball tournament was held at BayCare Ballpark in Clearwater, Florida, from May 25 through 30. The event, held at the end of the conference regular season, determined the champion of the American Athletic Conference for the 2021 season. The winner of the double-elimination tournament, South Florida, received the conference's automatic bid to the 2021 NCAA Division I baseball tournament.

== Format and seeding ==
The top eight baseball teams in The American were seeded based on their records in conference play. The tournament used a two bracket double-elimination format, leading to a single championship game between the winners of each bracket.

== Bracket ==
First round
5 | UCF | 14
4 | Cincinnati | 10
8 | Memphis | 11^{7}
1 | East Carolina | 1
4 | Cincinnati | 9
1 | East Carolina | 10
7 | Houston | 1
2 | Tulane | 4
6 | South Florida | 7
3 | Wichita State | 2
7 | Houston | 3
3 | Wichita State | 5

Second round
5 | UCF | 17^{7}
8 | Memphis | 1
8 | Memphis | 0
1 | East Carolina | 12^{7}
2 | Tulane | 0
6 | South Florida | 5
2 | Tulane | 12^{7}
3 | Wichita State | 2

Semifinals
5 | UCF | 2 | 2
1 | East Carolina | 5 | 1
6 | South Florida | 6 | 7
2 | Tulane | 16 | 1

Finals
5 | UCF | 7
6 | South Florida | 8
