= 1996 West Virginia Mountaineers baseball team =

American college baseball season

1996 West Virginia Mountaineers baseball

Big East American Division champions Big East tournament champions

Atlantic Regional, 2-2
- Conference: Big East Conference
- American Division
- Record: 33-25 (15-10 Big East)
- Head coach: Greg Van Zant (1st season)
- Assistant coaches: Doug Little (2nd season); Jon Szynal (2nd season); Eric Pavelko (1st season)
- Home stadium: Hawley Field (1,500)

1996 Big East Conference baseball standings
	Conf.						Overall
Team	W		L		T	PCT	W		L		T	PCT
American Division
West Virginia ^{x}‍‍‡‍^{y}	15	–	10	–	0	.600	33	–	25	–	0	.569
Providence ^{x}‍‍‍	15	–	10	–	0	.600	32	–	17	–	1	.650
St. John's ‍‍‍	14	–	10	–	0	.583	26	–	18	–	0	.591
Connecticut ‍‍‍	13	–	12	–	0	.520	24	–	23	–	0	.511
Pittsburgh ‍‍‍	9	–	13	–	0	.409	24	–	20	–	2	.543
Boston College ‍‍‍	6	–	18	–	0	.250	15	–	27	–	0	.357
National Division
Villanova ^{x}‍‍‍	16	–	5	–	0	.762	25	–	20	–	0	.556
Rutgers ‍‍‍	15	–	7	–	1	.674	32	–	21	–	1	.602
Notre Dame ‍‍‍^{y}	13	–	7	–	0	.650	44	–	18	–	0	.710
Georgetown ‍‍‍	6	–	18	–	0	.250	18	–	34	–	0	.346
Seton Hall ‍‍‍	5	–	17	–	1	.239	18	–	27	–	1	.402
x – Division champion ‡ – Tournament champion y – Invited to the NCAA tournament As of June 30, 1996; Rankings from Collegiate Baseball

The 1996 West Virginia Mountaineers baseball team represented West Virginia University during the 1996 NCAA Division I baseball season. The Mountaineers played their home games at Hawley Field as a member of the Big East Conference. They were led by head coach Greg Van Zant, in his 1st season at West Virginia.
