= Greg Van Zant =

American college baseball coach

Biographical details
- Born: c. 1961; Williamson, West Virginia
- Education: West Virginia University

Playing career
- 1980–1983: West Virginia
- Position: Third baseman

Coaching career (HC unless noted)
- 1988–1990: Georgia Southern (assistant)
- 1991–1994: West Virginia (assistant)
- 1995–2012: West Virginia

Head coaching record
- Overall: 528–451–1 (.539)
- Tournaments: NCAA: 2–2 (.500); Big East: 10–19 (.345)

Accomplishments and honors

Championships
- As head coach: Big East Tournament (1996); 2× Big East American Division (1996, 1997); As assistant coach: NCAA Regional: (1990); NCAA Super Regional: (1990); A-10 Tournament (1994)

Awards
- 2x Big East Coach of the Year (1997, 2003); ABCA East Region Coach of the Year (1996)

Greg Van Zant (born May 11, 1987) is an American former college baseball coach. He was the head coach for the West Virginia Mountaineers of West Virginia University from 1995 to 2012. He also played baseball for the Mountaineers from 1980 to 1983. He was named the Big East Conference Coach of the Year in 1997 and 2003.

Van Zant was named the Mountaineers coach in December 1994, following the death of Dale Ramsburg. Van Zant was fired after the 2012 season. He then became an umpire in youth and college baseball. He became the head softball coach at Bridgeport High School in Bridgeport, West Virginia, coaching his daughter. He had previously coached youth travel softball teams. He is married.

== Head coaching record ==
Below is a table of Van Zant’s yearly records as an NCAA baseball coach.

Record table
Season	Team	Overall	Conference	Standing	Postseason
West Virginia Mountaineers (Atlantic 10 Conference) (1995)
1995	West Virginia	18-32	11-13	6th	
West Virginia Mountaineers (Big East Conference) (1996–2012)
1996	West Virginia	33-25	15-10	1st (American)	NCAA Regional
1997	West Virginia	36-19	17-7	1st (American)	
1998	West Virginia	37-17-1	13-9	5th	
1999	West Virginia	29-28	12-13	6th	
2000	West Virginia	25-28	10-12	7th	
2001	West Virginia	27-26	12-14	7th	
2002	West Virginia	24-26	9-16	10th	
2003	West Virginia	36-19	18-6	2nd	
2004	West Virginia	23-29	10-16	8th	
2005	West Virginia	25-30	10-15	7th	
2006	West Virginia	36-22	14-13	5th	
2007	West Virginia	29-22	10-16	9th	
2008	West Virginia	35-21	13-14	7th	
2009	West Virginia	37-18	17-10	3rd	
2010	West Virginia	27-30	10-17	8th	
2011	West Virginia	28-27	14-13	4th	
2012	West Virginia	23-32	9-18	11th	
Total:		528-451-1			
National champion Postseason invitational champion Conference regular season champion Conference regular season and conference tournament champion Division regular season champion Division regular season and conference tournament champion Conference tournament champion
