= 1996 Colonial Athletic Association baseball tournament =

American college baseball tournament

- Teams: 8
- Format: Double-elimination tournament
- Finals site: Grainger Stadium; Kinston, North Carolina
- Champions: Old Dominion (3rd title)
- Winning coach: Tony Guzzo (2nd title)
- MVP: Ron Walker (Old Dominion)

1996 Colonial Athletic Association baseball standings
| | Conf. | | | | Overall |
| Team | W | | L | PCT | W | | L | PCT |
|---|---|---|---|---|---|---|---|---|
| Old Dominion ‍†‍‡‍^{y} | 13 | – | 7 | .650 | 39 | – | 17 | .696 |
| Richmond ‍†‍‍ | 13 | – | 7 | .650 | 27 | – | 25 | .519 |
| VCU ‍‍‍ | 11 | – | 7 | .611 | 34 | – | 22 | .607 |
| George Mason ‍‍‍ | 12 | – | 9 | .571 | 25 | – | 29 | .463 |
| East Carolina ‍‍‍ | 10 | – | 11 | .476 | 22 | – | 24 | .478 |
| James Madison ‍‍‍ | 9 | – | 11 | .450 | 34 | – | 25 | .576 |
| UNC Wilmington ‍‍‍ | 9 | – | 11 | .450 | 28 | – | 30 | .483 |
| William & Mary ‍‍‍ | 2 | – | 16 | .111 | 23 | – | 25 | .479 |
† – Conference champion ‡ – Tournament champion y – Invited to the NCAA tournament As of June 30, 1996; Rankings from Collegiate Baseball

The 1996 Colonial Athletic Association baseball tournament was held at Grainger Stadium in Kinston, North Carolina, from May 14 through 18. The event determined the champion of the Colonial Athletic Association for the 1996 season. Defending champion and top-seeded Old Dominion won the tournament for the third consecutive, and third overall, time and earned the CAA's automatic bid to the 1996 NCAA Division I baseball tournament.

Entering the event, East Carolina had won the most championships, with five. George Mason and had Old Dominion each won two, while Richmond had won once.

== Format and seeding ==
The CAA's teams were seeded one to eight based on winning percentage from the conference's round robin regular season. They played a double-elimination tournament.

| Team | W | L | Pct. | GB | Seed |
|---|---|---|---|---|---|
| Old Dominion | 13 | 7 | .650 | — | 1 |
| Richmond | 13 | 7 | .650 | — | 2 |
| VCU | 11 | 7 | .611 | 1 | 3 |
| George Mason | 12 | 9 | .571 | 1.5 | 4 |
| East Carolina | 10 | 11 | .476 | 3.5 | 5 |
| James Madison | 9 | 11 | .450 | 4 | 6 |
| UNC Wilmington | 9 | 11 | .450 | 4 | 7 |
| William & Mary | 2 | 16 | .111 | 10 | 8 |

== Bracket and results ==
Upper round 1 | Upper round 2 | Upper final | Final
1 | Old Dominion | 6
8 | William & Mary | 6
1 | Old Dominion | 9
5 | East Carolina | 7
4 | George Mason | 0
5 | East Carolina | 1
1 | Old Dominion | 4
7 | UNC Wilmington | 2
3 | VCU | 5
6 | James Madison | 10
6 | James Madison | 4
7 | UNC Wilmington | 9
2 | Richmond | 4
7 | UNC Wilmington | 7 | 1 | Old Dominion | 4 | —
6 | James Madison | 3 | —
Lower round 1 | Lower round 2 | Lower round 3 | Lower final
6 | James Madison | 8
8 | William & Mary | 5 | 8 | William & Mary | 4 | 7 | UNC Wilmington | 5
4 | George Mason | 4 | 6 | James Madison | 10 | 6 | James Madison | 8
3 | VCU | 1
5 | East Carolina | 0
3 | VCU | 12 | 3 | VCU | 10
2 | Richmond | 4

== Most Valuable Player ==
Ron Walker was named Tournament Most Valuable Player. Walker was a third baseman and pitcher for Old Dominion.
