= Ellis Valentine =

American baseball player (born 1954)

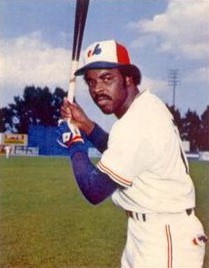
- Right fielder
- Born: July 30, 1954 (age 72); Helena, Arkansas, U.S.
- Batted: Right Threw: Right

MLB debut
- September 3, 1975, for the Montreal Expos

Last MLB appearance
- October 2, 1985, for the Texas Rangers

MLB statistics
- Batting average: .278
- Home runs: 123
- Runs batted in: 474
- Stats at Baseball Reference

Teams
- Montreal Expos (1975–1981); New York Mets (1981–1982); California Angels (1983); Texas Rangers (1985)

Career highlights and awards
- All-Star (1977); Gold Glove Award (1978)

Ellis Clarence Valentine (born July 30, 1954) is an American former Major League Baseball right fielder. He is remembered for having one of the all-time great throwing arms. "There's a plateau where you can't throw the ball any harder and you can't be any more accurate", said former Montreal manager Felipe Alou. "That was Ellis Valentine."

== Montreal Expos ==
=== Early years ===
Valentine played football and baseball at Crenshaw High School in Los Angeles. He was the first professional athlete ever signed out of Crenshaw when the Montreal Expos selected him in the second round of the 1972 Major League Baseball draft. He was quickly recognized as one of the top prospects in the Expos' lauded farm system. He batted .289 with 27 home runs and 195 runs batted in over four different levels in four seasons to earn a September call up to Montreal at the end of the 1975 season. In his fifth major league at-bat, he hit his first major league home run off the Pittsburgh Pirates' Jim Rooker. He remained in the Expos' line-up semi-regularly through the end of the season, posting a .364 batting average.

Gary Carter, who was an All-Star and finished second in National League Rookie of the Year balloting as the right fielder for the Expos in 1975, was shifted back to his natural position behind the plate for the 1976 season to make room for Valentine in right field. After batting just .238 with two home runs and six RBIs through the middle of May, he was shipped back to the Triple-A Denver Bears for more seasoning. He rejoined the Expos in mid-July, and batted .285 with five home runs and 33 RBIs the rest of the way.

=== Cromartie & Dawson ===
On April 15, 1977, Valentine hit the first ever home run at Olympic Stadium. He also hit two inside-the-park home runs for the home crowd during the Expos' inaugural season in their new stadium.

Joining him in Montreal's outfield for the 1977 season would be 22-year-old center fielder Andre Dawson and 23-year-old left fielder Warren Cromartie. Their youth, speed and power soon made them the talk of the baseball world. Valentine was the first to emerge as a star; he was the Expos' sole representative at the 1977 Major League Baseball All-Star Game at Yankee Stadium. Already recognized for his exceptional arm by this point in his career, he engaged in a throwing contest before the game with the Pittsburgh Pirates' Dave Parker, Los Angeles Dodgers' Reggie Smith and San Diego Padres' Dave Winfield, who were also recognized as having the finest throwing arms in the National League. For the season, he batted a team leading .293, and finished second to Gary Carter with 25 home runs and 76 RBIs.

He, Cromartie and Dawson turned it up a notch in 1978. Valentine led the major leagues with 25 assists from the outfield to receive a Gold Glove Award as one of the National League's top three defensive outfielders. Meanwhile, Cromartie and Dawson also led their respective positions in outfield assists to give the Expos the unquestionable top defensive outfield in the major leagues. With their bats, Valentine and Dawson tied for the team lead with 25 home runs apiece, Valentine had a team leading 76 RBIs, Dawson scored a team leading 84 runs and Cromartie had a team leading .297 batting average.

=== Suspension ===
The Expos were in a pennant race for the entire 1979 season, however, Valentine's 1979 season got off to a bumpy start. He was one-for-three with an RBI in the Expos' match-up with the Chicago Cubs at Wrigley Field on April 21, but that only brought his batting average up to an even .200, and his RBI total to four. In the eighth inning, with two outs and a runner on second, Valentine drew a walk, bringing future Hall of Famer Tony Pérez to the plate.

Bruce Sutter induced a ground ball to short; Cubs shortstop Iván DeJesús flipped the ball to second baseman Ted Sizemore to force Valentine at second, and end the threat. Valentine disagreed with the call, and tossed his batting helmet into short right field in frustration. Believing that the helmet was tossed at him, second base umpire Steve Fields ejected Valentine from the game. Outraged, Valentine charged the umpire and bumped him. Valentine received a three-game suspension and $500 fine for his actions.

The controversy seemed to do him some good, as he started hitting right after the incident occurred. Valentine hit a pinch hit three-run home run to carry the Expos to a 7–5 victory over the San Francisco Giants in his first game back, and went 12-for-33 with ten RBIs in his first ten games back from his suspension. In the first game of a May 27 doubleheader with the St. Louis Cardinals, he drove in six runs to carry the Expos to an 8–3 victory. In the second game, he drove in a seventh run to establish a club record for RBIs in a doubleheader. The next day, he drove in four runs against the Philadelphia Phillies. The Expos won a franchise best 95 games in 1979 to finish two games back of the Pittsburgh Pirates. For his part, Valentine batted .276 with 21 home runs and a career high 82 RBIs.

=== Shattered cheekbone ===
On May 30, 1980 Valentine was hit in the face with a pitch by Roy Thomas of the St. Louis Cardinals. His cheekbone cracked in six places, and he was forced to miss over a month of action. At the time of the incident, Valentine was leading his team with 27 RBIs, and was batting just under .300. With slugging third baseman Larry Parrish also out of the line-up with a wrist injury, the Expos did surprisingly well in Valentine's absence; they went 21–16 to take a half-game lead in the National League East over the Phillies.

When Valentine finally returned on July 10, he began wearing part of a football face mask on his helmet. Though it looked strange, it briefly caught on with other players who were worried about similar injuries.

He batted .331 with nine home runs and 39 RBIs over the rest of the season, as the Expos found themselves in a three-way race with the Pirates and Phillies in the NL East. Valentine played hurt through much of his team's stretch drive toward the pennant, but he was sidelined for much of it with a pinched nerve, a hip injury and a hand injury. On September 21, Valentine injured his wrist, ending his season. The Expos surrendered first place in the division to the Phillies on the second to last day of the season.

== New York Mets ==
Valentine got off to a slow start in 1981. He was batting .211 with three home runs and fifteen RBIs when he was sidelined by a pulled hamstring in his left leg on May 19. He was still on the disabled list when the Expos dealt him to the New York Mets for Jeff Reardon, Dan Norman and a player to be named later.

Valentine's first season at Shea did not go as well as planned. It did, however, have an interesting side effect on the Mets' line-up. Dave Kingman, who batted fourth in the Mets' line-up, began seeing better pitches with Valentine behind him. Over the first sixteen games in which Kingman and Valentine batted fourth and fifth in the line-up, Kingman clubbed seven home runs with sixteen RBIs. Valentine, meanwhile, batted just .176 over that stretch with one home run and seven RBIs. Almost as if National League pitchers realized they had nothing to fear from Valentine's bat, Kingman began seeing tougher pitching again, and hit just three more home runs over the rest of the season.

With new manager George Bamberger and George Foster added to their line-up for 1982, the Mets went into Spring training with high hopes. As things turned out, the Mets narrowly avoided losing one hundred games, and finished last in their division. Valentine went 31 games to start the season without driving in a single run. From there, Valentine put up respectable numbers, seven home runs and 33 RBIs, through the Mets' 6–4 victory over the Chicago Cubs on August 13. After which, Valentine called the New York Mets "the worst organization in baseball" to New York reporters.

As one might imagine, this charge did not sit well with Mets management. Bamberger and Mets GM Frank Cashen met with Valentine on August 15, and offered to try to trade the disgruntled outfielder. They were unable to find a taker despite the impressive .327 batting average Valentine put up over the rest of the season.

== California Angels ==
Valentine was selected by just one team, the Pittsburgh Pirates, in the MLB re-entry draft when he became a free agent at the end of the season. When the California Angels' Bobby Clark suffered a back injury playing Winter ball in the Venezuelan Professional Baseball League, it opened up a vacancy in the Angels' outfield. Valentine signed with his home team on January 21, 1983.

After straining his Achilles tendon during Spring training, he failed to make it onto the field for his new club until their 25th game. He appeared in 86 games for the Angels in 1983, batting .240 with thirteen home runs and 43 RBIs. At the end of the season, he signed a multi-year deal with the Angels, however, a bruised heel kept him off the field for the entire 1984 season. He logged just four plate appearances on a rehab assignment with the Edmonton Trappers, and was released at the end of the season.

== Texas Rangers ==
The Texas Rangers, who were in last place in the American League West and in dire need of offense, signed Valentine to a minor league pact on July 6, 1985. He played well, batting .314 with ten home runs and 33 RBIs in 46 games for the triple A Oklahoma City 89ers, but it did not translate to major league success when he joined the Rangers in September. He was not offered a contract for 1986, but received an invitation to Spring training that he declined, retiring instead.

== Career stats ==
Games	PA	AB	Runs	Hits	2B	3B	HR	RBI	SB	BB	SO	Avg.	OBP	Slg.	OPS	Fld%	OA
894	3392	3166	380	881	169	15	123	474	59	180	462	.278	.315	.458	.773	.972	85

Alongside Steve Garvey, George Brett, Ken Brett, Tommy Lasorda and Fred Lynn, Valentine appeared in the "Superstar/Salem" episode of Fantasy Island during the series' first season (original air date: March 25, 1978). Gary Burghoff plays an accountant with the fantasy of being a Major League Baseball pitcher. Valentine is one of his strikeout victims.

After retiring from baseball, Valentine took a job with Avis Rent-a-Car earning $4.25 per hour. In his first baseball-related job since retirement, Valentine managed Antelope Valley in the short-lived Golden State League in 1995. His tenure with the financially doomed league lasted just a week, as the league would fold.

== Post-playing career ==
Valentine fought drug and alcohol addiction throughout his career. In September 1986, a year after retiring, he moved from Southern California, and immediately entered drug rehab in Phoenix, Arizona. After cleaning up, he took a position as a drug counselor with St. Luke's Hospital, and began helping others overcome similar issues. He holds certificates in behavioral-health and chemical dependency counseling.

Valentine currently lives in the Dallas-Fort Worth area, where he works as a counselor at a local church and is a member of the Texas Rangers Alumni Association. He is the co-founder and president of PastPros, a web-based service that allows sports fans to purchase memorabilia directly from retired athletes. Also, 2014 Valentine founded RAFT Recovery inc. A 501 c 3 non profit that coaches individuals struggling with addictive behaviors. His charitable work does not stop there. The program also provides a lawn service for disabled seniors in the Dallas, Fort Worth area and surrounding communities.
