= 1996 Southland Conference baseball tournament =

- Teams: 6
- Format: Double-elimination
- Finals site: Fair Grounds Field; Shreveport, Louisiana
- Champions: Sam Houston State (1st title)
- Winning coach: John Skeeters (1st title)
- MVP: Brent Bubela (Sam Houston State)

1996 Southland Conference baseball standings
	Conf.				Overall
Team	W		L	PCT	W		L	PCT
Louisiana
Northeast Louisiana ^{x}‍‍‍	21	–	9	.700	41	–	19	.683
Northwestern State ‍‍‍	14	–	16	.467	34	–	27	.557
Nicholls State ‍‍‍	11	–	19	.367	17	–	36	.321
McNeese State ‍‍‍	10	–	20	.333	23	–	31	.426
Texas
Southwest Texas State ^{x}‍‍‍	19	–	11	.633	27	–	32	.458
Texas–San Antonio ‍‍‍	17	–	13	.567	26	–	26	.500
Sam Houston State ‍‍‡‍^{y}	15	–	15	.500	31	–	29	.517
Texas–Arlington ‍‍‍	13	–	17	.433	23	–	35	.397
x – Division champion ‡ – Tournament champion y – Invited to the NCAA tournament As of June 30, 1996; Rankings from Collegiate Baseball

The 1996 Southland Conference baseball tournament was held from May 16 to 19, 1996 to determine the champion of the Southland Conference in the sport of college baseball for the 1996 season. The event pitted the top six finishers from the conference's regular season in a double-elimination tournament held at Fair Grounds Field in Shreveport, Louisiana. Fourth-seeded Sam Houston State won their first championship and claimed the automatic bid to the 1996 NCAA Division I baseball tournament.

== Seeding and format ==
The top six finishers from the regular season were seeded one through six. They played a double-elimination tournament.

Team	W	L	T	Pct	Seed
Louisiana Division
Northeast Louisiana	21	9	.700	—	1
Northwestern State	14	16	.467	7	5
Nicholls State	11	19	.367	10	—
McNeese State	10	20	.333	11	—

Team	W	L	T	Pct	Seed
Texas Division
Southwest Texas State	19	11	.633	—	2
UTSA	17	13	.567	2	3
Sam Houston State	15	15	.500	4	4
Texas–Arlington	13	17	.433	6	6

== Bracket and results ==
First round
1	Northeast Louisiana	4
6	Texas–Arlington	3
3	UTSA	7
4	Sam Houston State	8
2	Southwest Texas State	11
5	Northwestern State	10

Second round
1	Northeast Louisiana	5
3	UTSA	3
4	Sam Houston State	2
2	Southwest Texas State	1
6	Texas–Arlington	6
5	Northwestern State	7

Third round
1	Northeast Louisiana	1
4	Sam Houston State	11
2	Southwest Texas State	1
5	Northwestern State	2

Semifinals
1	Northeast Louisiana	4
5	Northwestern State	7

Final
4	Sam Houston State	8	—
5	Northwestern State	7	—

== All-Tournament Team ==
The following players were named to the All-Tournament Team.

Pos.	Name	School
P	Kevin Hermes	Sam Houston State
P	David Balcer	Northwestern State
C	Juan Navarro	Northwestern State
1B	George Kellert	Northwestern State
2B	Brian Gaffney	Sam Houston State
3B	Fred Ortega	Northwestern State
SS	Ray Arrrendondo	Southwest Texas State
OF	Matt Schnabel	Southwest Texas State
OF	Will Pearce	Northwestern State
OF	Shannon Cooley	Northeast Louisiana
DH	Brent Bubela	Sam Houston State

=== Most Valuable Player ===
Brent Bubela was named Tournament Most Valuable Player. Buebla was a designated hitter for Sam Houston State.
