= 1996 Conference USA baseball tournament =

College baseball tournament

- Teams: 9
- Format: Play-in round followed by eight-team double-elimination tournament
- Finals site: Pete Taylor Park; Hattiesburg, Mississippi
- Champions: Tulane (1st title)
- Winning coach: Rick Jones (1st title)
- MVP: Jason Fitzgerald (Tulane)

1996 Conference USA baseball standings
| | Conf. | | | | Overall |
| Team | W | | L | PCT | W | | L | PCT |
|---|---|---|---|---|---|---|---|---|
| South Florida ‍†‍‍^{y} | 20 | – | 4 | .833 | 47 | – | 19 | .712 |
| Tulane ‍‍‡‍^{y} | 18 | – | 6 | .750 | 43 | – | 20 | .683 |
| Southern Miss ‍‍‍ | 14 | – | 10 | .583 | 32 | – | 28 | .533 |
| UAB ‍‍‍ | 13 | – | 11 | .542 | 33 | – | 25 | .569 |
| Charlotte ‍‍‍ | 11 | – | 13 | .458 | 29 | – | 30 | .492 |
| Memphis ‍‍‍ | 9 | – | 11 | .450 | 26 | – | 28 | .481 |
| Saint Louis ‍‍‍ | 9 | – | 12 | .429 | 25 | – | 24 | .510 |
| Louisville ‍‍‍ | 6 | – | 15 | .286 | 18 | – | 36 | .333 |
| Cincinnati ‍‍‍ | 1 | – | 19 | .050 | 5 | – | 34 | .128 |
† – Conference champion ‡ – Tournament champion y – Invited to the NCAA tournament As of June 30, 1996; Rankings from Collegiate Baseball

The 1996 Conference USA baseball tournament was the 1996 postseason college baseball championship of the NCAA Division I Conference USA, held at Pete Taylor Park in Hattiesburg, Mississippi, from May 14 through 19. Tulane won the tournament and received Conference USA's automatic bid to the 1996 NCAA Division I baseball tournament. The tournament consisted of nine teams with a play-in game, two double-elimination brackets, and a single-game final.

== Regular season results ==
| Team | W | L | Pct | GB | Seed |
|---|---|---|---|---|---|
| South Florida | 20 | 4 | .833 | -- | 1 |
| Tulane | 18 | 6 | .750 | 2 | 2 |
| Southern Miss | 14 | 10 | .583 | 6 | 3 |
| UAB | 13 | 11 | .542 | 7 | 4 |
| Charlotte | 11 | 13 | .468 | 9 | 5 |
| Memphis | 9 | 11 | .450 | 9 | 6 |
| Saint Louis | 9 | 12 | .429 | 9.5 | 7 |
| Louisville | 6 | 15 | .286 | 12.5 | 8 |
| Cincinnati | 1 | 19 | .050 | 17 | 9 |

- Records listed are conference play only. Marquette and DePaul did not field baseball teams. Houston participated in the Southwest Conference for baseball.

== Bracket ==
=== Play-in game ===
The two teams with the worst records in regular season conference play faced each other in a single elimination situation to earn the 8th spot in the conference tournament.

| Play-in game May 14 |
| 9 | Cincinnati | 2 |
| 8 | **Louisville** | **4** |

=== Main Bracket ===
First round May 15–16
5 | **Charlotte** | **17**
4 | UAB | 9
9 | **Louisville** | **13**
1 | South Florida | 9
4 | UAB | 7
1 | **South Florida** | **9**
7 | Saint Louis | 5
2 | **Tulane** | **14**
6 | Memphis | 4
3 | **Southern Miss** | **9**
7 | **Saint Louis** | **9**
6 | Memphis | 8

Second round May 16–17
9 | Louisville | 3
5 | **Charlotte** | **23**
9 | Louisville | 11
1 | **South Florida** | **14**
3 | Southern Miss | 5
2 | **Tulane** | **9**
7 | Saint Louis | 5
3 | **Southern Miss** | **9**

Semifinals; May 17–18
5 | Charlotte | 2 | 6
1 | **South Florida** | **13** | **17**
3 | Southern Miss | 8
2 | **Tulane** | **10**

Championship Game; May 19
2 | **Tulane** | **2**
1 | South Florida | 0

- **Bold** indicates the winner of the game.
- Italics indicate that the team was eliminated from the tournament.

== Finish order ==
| Finish | Team | W | L | Pct | Seed | Eliminated By |
|---|---|---|---|---|---|---|
| 1 | Tulane^{†} | 4 | 0 | .1000 | 2 | |
| 2 | South Florida^{#} | 4 | 2 | .667 | 1 | Tulane |
| 3 | Southern Miss | 2 | 2 | .500 | 3 | Tulane |
| 4 | Charlotte | 2 | 2 | .500 | 5 | South Florida |
| 5 | Saint Louis | 1 | 2 | .333 | 7 | Southern Miss |
| 6 | Louisville | 1 | 2 | .333 | 9 | South Florida |
| 7 | Memphis | 0 | 2 | .000 | 6 | Saint Louis |
| 8 | UAB | 0 | 2 | .000 | 7 | South Florida |
^{†} - Winner of the tournament and received an automatic bid to the NCAA tournament.^{#} - Received an at-large bid to the NCAA tournament.

== All-Tournament Team ==
| Position | Player | School |
|---|---|---|
| C | Chad Sutter | Tulane |
| 1B | Cliff Wren | Southern Mississippi |
| 2B | Mike Pursell | Tulane |
| SS | Joe Hammond | Charlotte |
| 3B | Chris Heintz | South Florida |
| OF | Joey Anderson | Charlotte |
| OF | Jason Fitzgerald | Tulane |
| OF | Jason Michonski | South Florida |
| DH | Jeff Davis | Southern Mississippi |
| P | Jack Cressend | Tulane |
| RP | Todd Ardoin | Tulane |
| **MVP** | Jason Fitzgerald | Tulane |
