= Estadio Manuel "Ciclón" Echeverría =

Stadium in Navojoa, Sonora, Mexico

- El Ciclón

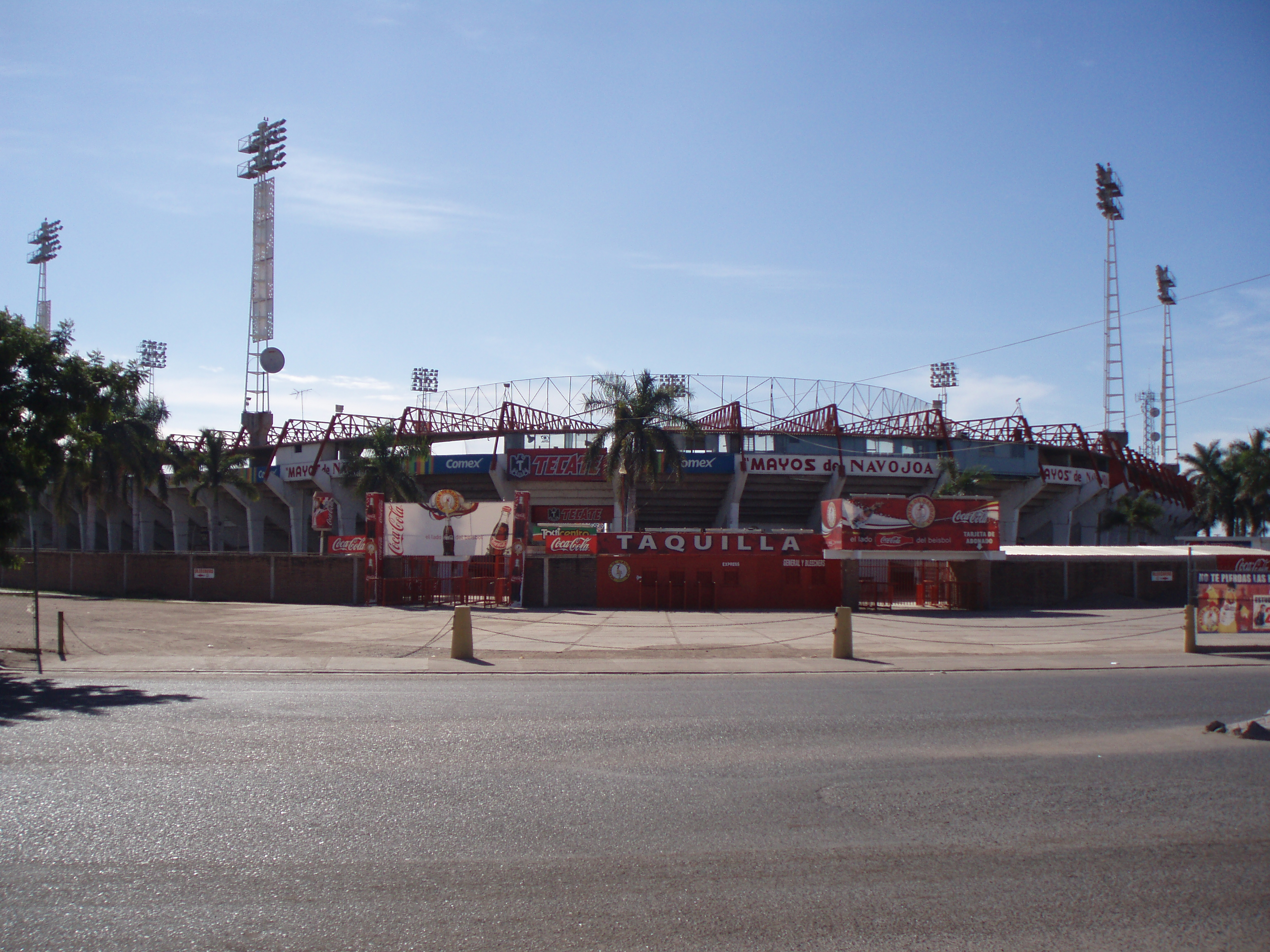
- Interactive map of Estadio Manuel "Ciclón" Echeverría
- Former names: Estadio Municipal de Navojoa
- Location: Navojoa, Sonora, Mexico
- Coordinates: 27°03′46″N 109°27′04.68″W
- Owner: Sonora State Government
- Operator: Promociones Deportivas del Mayo SA de CV
- Capacity: 11,500
- Surface: Bermuda Grass
- Field size: Left field - 322 feet (98 m); Center field - 365 feet (111 m); Right field - 322 feet (98 m)

Construction
- Opened: 7 October 1970
- Architect: Arq. Carlos Perez Pliego Soto

Tenant
- Mayos de Navojoa (LMP) (1970-present)

Estadio Manuel "Ciclón" Echeverría is a stadium in Navojoa, Sonora, named after one local baseball player, Manuel Echeverría, nicknamed "Ciclón". He is a member of the Mexican Professional Baseball Hall of Fame.

It is the home field of the baseball team Mayos de Navojoa of the Mexican Pacific League. It opened on 7 October 1970 and holds 11,500 people, all seated. It is located within the Unidad Deportiva Faustino Félix Serna.

Dimensions
Left Field - 328 ft (100 m)
Center Field - 400 ft (122 m)
Right Field - 328 ft (100 m)
