= Manuel Echeverría =

Mexican baseball player

- Pitcher
- Born: 14 August 1913; Navojoa, Sonora, Mexico
- Died: 14 October 1981 (aged 68); La Paz, Baja California Sur, Mexico
- Batted: Unknown Threw: Right
- Stats at Baseball Reference

Member of the Mexican Professional

Baseball Hall of Fame
- Induction: 1982

Manuel "Ciclón" Echeverría, (14 August 1913 – 14 October 1981) was a Mexican baseball player who pitched primarily in the Mexican League.

== Career ==
As a child, Echeverría played for the team of the Talamante School in his hometown of Navojoa, Sonora. In 1935, he was a part of the Sonora Baseball Team.

Echeverría played on the Mexico national baseball team that competed at the 1938 Central American and Caribbean Games in Panama City, registering two hits in three at-bats.

He played in the Liga de la Costa with Naranjeros de Hermosillo and Mayos de Navojoa, where he recorded 82 wins and 54 losses. He had his most success with Águilas de Mexicali in the Sunset League, where he recorded 69 wins and 21 losses over four years. In 1951, he went 28–8 with 333 strikeouts and a 2.74 ERA, earning himself the league's most valuable player award.

Echeverría also played for Cafeteros de Córdoba, Industriales de Monterrey, Alijadores de Tampico, Azules de Veracruz, Ángeles de Puebla, Tecolotes de Nuevo Laredo, Tuneros de San Luis and Diablos Rojos del México of the Mexican League.

== Death and legacy ==
Echeverría died on 14 October 1981, while playing a softball match in the Municipal Stadium of La Paz, Baja California Sur. The following year, he was inducted into the Mexican Professional Baseball Hall of Fame. The Mayos de Navojoa stadium is named after him.
