= Stark Field =

Baseball field in El Centro, California

Coordinates: 32.785024°N 115.551522°W

Stark Field is a professional-size baseball field located in El Centro, California. It played host to the El Centro Imperials minor league baseball team of the Sunset League and Southwest International League from 1947 to 1951. It has served as a practice facility for the local Mid-Valley Babe Ruth Little League teams.

The ballpark played host to four Golden Baseball League games as the Yuma Scorpions donned special replica uniforms of the Imperials honoring their history. The move in 2008 also had its criticism of "possibly displacing about 100 Mid-Valley Babe Ruth little leaguers." Despite the controversy, over 300 fans attended the games and this prompted the GBL's instructional Arizona Summer League to revive the Imperials as a member in 2009.

The Imperials are expected to play at Stark Field for the Arizona Winter League beginning in 2010.
