= 1996 Big East Conference baseball tournament =

American college baseball tournament

- Teams: 6
- Format: Double-elimination tournament
- Finals site: Senator Thomas J. Dodd Memorial Stadium; Norwich, Connecticut
- Champions: West Virginia (1st title)
- Winning coach: Greg Van Zant (1st title)
- MVP: Chris Enochs (West Virginia)

1996 Big East Conference baseball standings
	Conf.						Overall
Team	W		L		T	PCT	W		L		T	PCT
American Division
West Virginia ^{x}‍‍‡‍^{y}	15	–	10	–	0	.600	33	–	25	–	0	.569
Providence ^{x}‍‍‍	15	–	10	–	0	.600	32	–	17	–	1	.650
St. John's ‍‍‍	14	–	10	–	0	.583	26	–	18	–	0	.591
Connecticut ‍‍‍	13	–	12	–	0	.520	24	–	23	–	0	.511
Pittsburgh ‍‍‍	9	–	13	–	0	.409	24	–	20	–	2	.543
Boston College ‍‍‍	6	–	18	–	0	.250	15	–	27	–	0	.357
National Division
Villanova ^{x}‍‍‍	16	–	5	–	0	.762	25	–	20	–	0	.556
Rutgers ‍‍‍	15	–	7	–	1	.674	32	–	21	–	1	.602
Notre Dame ‍‍‍^{y}	13	–	7	–	0	.650	44	–	18	–	0	.710
Georgetown ‍‍‍	6	–	18	–	0	.250	18	–	34	–	0	.346
Seton Hall ‍‍‍	5	–	17	–	1	.239	18	–	27	–	1	.402
x – Division champion ‡ – Tournament champion y – Invited to the NCAA tournament As of June 30, 1996; Rankings from Collegiate Baseball

The 1996 Big East Conference baseball tournament was held at Senator Thomas J. Dodd Memorial Stadium in Norwich, Connecticut. This was the twelfth annual Big East Conference baseball tournament. The West Virginia Mountaineers won their only tournament championship in their first year in the league, and claimed the Big East Conference's automatic bid to the 1996 NCAA Division I baseball tournament. West Virginia joined the Big 12 Conference after the 2012 season.

== Format and seeding ==
The Big East baseball tournament was a 6 team double elimination tournament in 1996. The top three regular season finishers in each division were seeded one through three based on conference winning percentage only. West Virginia claimed the top seed from the American Division by winning the season series over Providence. The top team in each division played the third seed from the opposite division and the second seeds played each other in the first round. This was the first season of divisional play, resulting from the addition of Notre Dame, Rutgers and West Virginia to the league beginning with the 1996 season.

Team	W	L	T	Pct.	GB	Seed
American Division
West Virginia	15	10	0	.600	–	1A
Providence	15	10	0	.600	–	2A
St. John's	14	10	0	.583	.5	3A
Connecticut	13	12	0	.520	2	–
Pittsburgh	9	13	0	.409	4.5	–
Boston College	6	18	0	.250	8.5	–
National Division
Villanova	16	5	0	.762	–	1N
Rutgers	15	7	1	.674	2	2N
Notre Dame	13	7	0	.650	2.5	3N
Georgetown	6	18	0	.250	11.5	–
Seton Hall	5	17	1	.239	12	–

== Bracket ==
First round
1A	West Virginia	10
3N	Notre Dame	5
1N	Villanova	1
3A	St. John's	4
2A	Providence	4
2N	Rutgers	1

Second round
1A	West Virginia	5
2N	Rutgers	0
3A	St. John's	3
2A	Providence	2
3N	Notre Dame	4
1N	Villanova	3

Third round
1A	West Virginia	6
3A	St. John's	5
2A	Providence	2
3N	Notre Dame	4

Semifinals
3A	St. John's	0
3N	Notre Dame	4

Final
1A	West Virginia	2	7
3N	Notre Dame	5	4

== Jack Kaiser Award ==
Chris Enochs was the winner of the 1996 Jack Kaiser Award. Enochs was a pitcher for West Virginia.
