= Edwin Thompson =

American baseball coach and former outfielder

Current position
- Title: Head coach
- Team: Georgetown
- Conference: Big East
- Record: 147–163 (.474)

Biographical details
- Born: June 2, 1980 (age 46); Fairfax, Virginia, U.S.

Playing career
- 1999: Howard
- 2000: Maryland
- 2001–2002: Webber International
- 2003: Bangor Lumberjacks
- Position: Outfielder

Coaching career (HC unless noted)
- 2005–2008: UMaine Farmington (asst.)
- 2009–2010: Bates
- 2011–2012: Duke (asst.)
- 2013–2015: Georgia State (asst.)
- 2016–2020: Eastern Kentucky
- 2021–present: Georgetown

Head coaching record
- Overall: 308–319 (.491)
- Tournaments: OVC: 5–4 (.556); Big East: 3–6 (.333); NCAA: 0–0

Accomplishments and honors

Awards
- Big East Coach of the Year (2022)

Edwin Thompson (born June 2, 1980) is an American baseball coach and former outfielder, who is the current head baseball coach of the Georgetown Hoyas. He played college baseball at Howard, Maryland and Webber International. He then served as the head coach of the Bates Bobcats (2009–2010) and Eastern Kentucky Colonels (2016–2020).

== Playing career ==
Thompson attended Jay High School in Jay, Maine. Thompson then committed to Howard University, where he was a member of the Howard Bison baseball team. After two seasons at Howard, he transferred to Maryland where he played baseball for a season, before transferring again to play at Webber International University.

== Coaching career ==
On July 23, 2008, Thompson was named the head coach of the Bates Bobcats baseball team. After leading the Bobcats to 11–22 and 25–11 during the 2009 and 2010 seasons respectively, Thompson signed to take an assistant coaching position with the Duke Blue Devils baseball team. After two seasons at Duke, Thompson became the top assistant for the Georgia State Panthers baseball program.

In July 2015, Thompson was named the head coach of the Eastern Kentucky Colonels baseball team. He resigned in September 2020 and accepted a position as head coach at Georgetown University.

== Head coaching record ==
Record table
Season	Team	Overall	Conference	Standing	Postseason
Bates Bobcats (New England Small College Athletic Conference) (2009–2010)
2009	Bates	12–22	3–9	4th (East)	
2010	Bates	25–11	6–6	T-2nd	
Bates:		37–33 (.529)	9–15 (.375)		
Eastern Kentucky Colonels (Ohio Valley Conference) (2016–2020)
2016	Eastern Kentucky	24–31	13–17	8th	
2017	Eastern Kentucky	24–32	10–20	11th	
2018	Eastern Kentucky	30–31	15–15	6th	Ohio Valley Tournament
2019	Eastern Kentucky	32–27	16–14	T-5th	Ohio Valley Tournament
2020	Eastern Kentucky	12–2	0–0		Season canceled due to COVID-19
Eastern Kentucky:		122–123 (.498)	63–47 (.573)		
Georgetown Hoyas (Big East Conference) (2021–present)
2021	Georgetown	6–25	6–19	8th	
2022	Georgetown	32–24	10–10	4th	Big East Tournament
2023	Georgetown	29–25	10–10	4th	Big East Tournament
2024	Georgetown	36–21	13–7	3rd	Big East Tournament
2025	Georgetown	16–40	3–18	8th	
2026	Georgetown	28–28	9–12	T–5th	
Georgetown:		147–163 (.474)	51–76 (.402)		
Total:		306–319 (.490)			

== See also ==
- List of current NCAA Division I baseball coaches
