= Billy Mohl =

American baseball coach (born 1984)

Current position
- Title: Pitching coach
- Team: Creighton Bluejays
- Conference: Big East
- Annual salary

Biographical details
- Born: June 1, 1984 (age 42); Wheat Ridge, Colorado, U.S.
- Education: Tulane University

Playing career
- 2003–2006: Tulane
- Position: Pitcher

Coaching career (HC unless noted)
- 2007–2009: Tulane (Asst.)
- 2010–2014: Illinois State (Asst.)
- 2015–2017: South Florida (P)
- 2018–2024: South Florida
- 2025–present: Creighton (P)

Head coaching record
- Overall: 174–187–1
- Tournaments: NCAA: 1–2

Accomplishments and honors

Championships
- The American Tournament (2021)

Awards
- Freshman Team All-C–USA (2003)

William T. Mohl (born June 1, 1984) is an American college baseball coach, who is the pitching coach for the Creighton Bluejays. He previously was the head baseball coach of the South Florida Bulls from 2018 to 2024. Mohl played baseball for the Tulane Green Wave baseball team while obtaining a degree. He was elected to the Tulane Hall of Fame in 2023.

== Playing career ==
Mohl played college baseball at Tulane University during the 2003 through 2006 seasons. As a freshman in 2003, Mohl was named to the Conference USA All-Freshman team. After the 2003 season, he played collegiate summer baseball for the Falmouth Commodores of the Cape Cod Baseball League, and was named a league all-star. Mohl completed his career at Tulane with a 25–7 record. He still ranks in the top 10 in several pitching categories at the school.

Mohl was then drafted in the 25th round of the 2006 Major League Baseball draft by the Philadelphia Phillies.

== Coaching career ==
After spending a season as an assistant while wrapping up his undergraduate degree at Tulane and two years as a volunteer assistant, Mohl became an assistant at Illinois State in 2010.

=== South Florida ===
When Mark Kingston was hired by the South Florida Bulls baseball team, he brought Mohl with him to be his pitching coach.

On June 30, 2017, Mohl was promoted to head coach of the Bulls beginning the 2018 season.

On May 20, 2024, South Florida dismissed Mohl after 7 seasons.

=== Creighton ===
On July 2, 2024, Mohl was hired as the pitching coach for the Creighton Bluejays baseball team.

== Head coaching record ==
Record table
Season	Team	Overall	Conference	Standing	Postseason
South Florida Bulls (American Athletic Conference) (2018–2024)
2018	South Florida	36–22–1	14–9–1	2nd	NCAA Regional
2019	South Florida	26–27	8–16	9th	
2020	South Florida	6–11	0–0		Season canceled due to COVID-19
2021	South Florida	31–30	14–14	6th	NCAA Super Regional
2022	South Florida	28–29	8–16	8th	American tournament
2023	South Florida	21–39	7–17	8th	American tournament
2024	South Florida	26–29	11–16	T–8th	
South Florida:		174–187–1	65–88–1		
Total:		174–187–1			
National champion Postseason invitational champion Conference regular season champion Conference regular season and conference tournament champion Division regular season champion Division regular season and conference tournament champion Conference tournament champion
