= Ontario Orioles =

- 1947–1947; Ontario, California

Minor league affiliations
- Previous classes: Class C
- League: Sunset League

Team data
- Previous parks: Ontario Baseball Park

The Ontario Orioles were a minor league baseball team that operated in 1947 as part of the Class-C Sunset League. They were based in Ontario, California and played at the Ontario Baseball Park. The team was managed by Danny Reagan and finished their one season of existence with a 64–75 record. The team was owned by former Major Leaguer Babe Dahlgren (per Jun/7/1947 UP-syndicated article in Pittsburgh Press, page 6).
