= Pete Hughes =

American college baseball coach (born 1968)

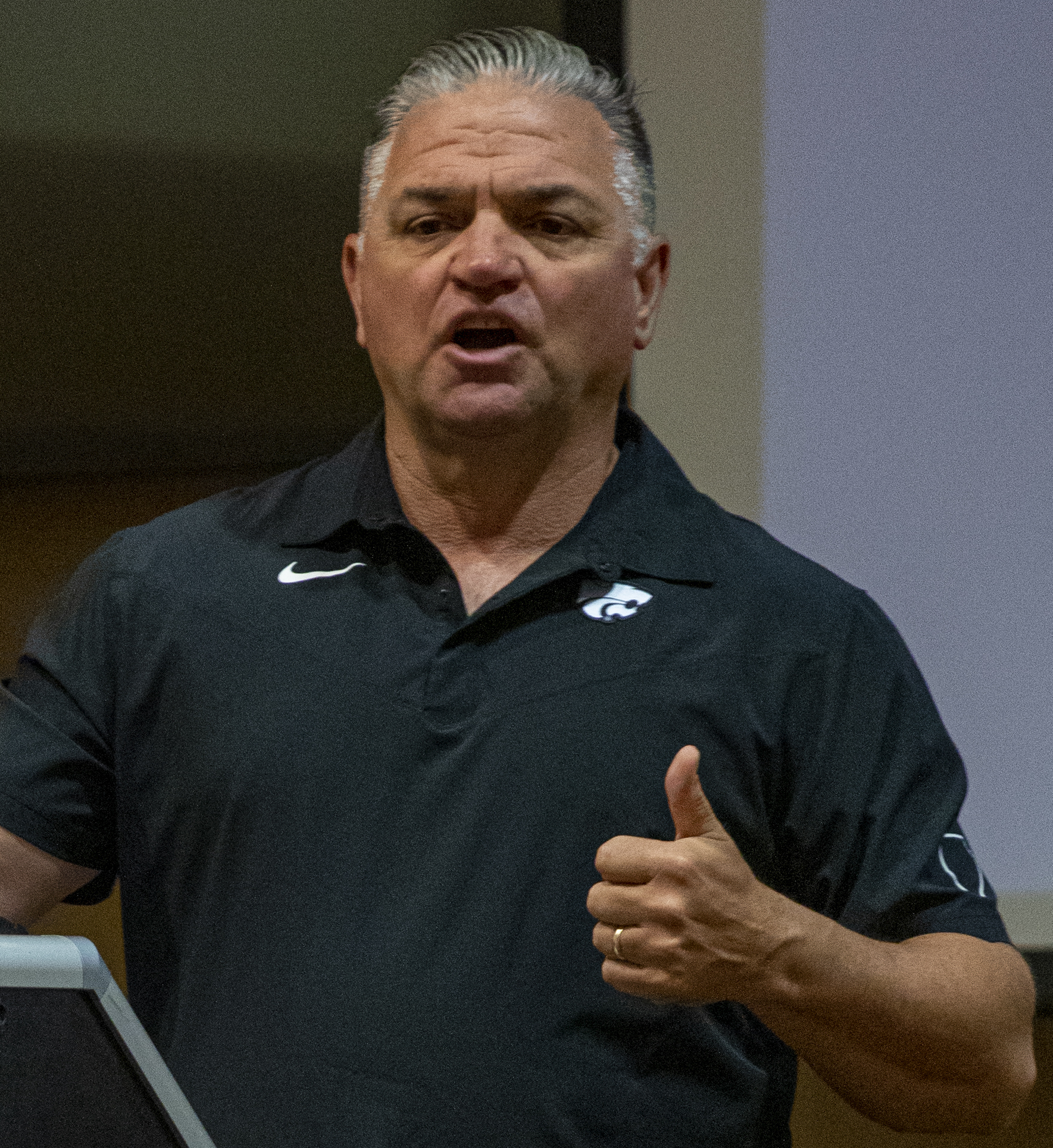
- Hughes at Fort Riley in 2022

Current position
- Title: Head coach
- Team: Kansas State
- Conference: Big 12
- Record: 200–168

Biographical details
- Born: January 11, 1968 (age 58); Brockton, Massachusetts, U.S.

Playing career
- 1986–1989: Davidson football
- 1987–1990: Davidson baseball
- Positions: QB, 3B

Coaching career (HC unless noted)

Football
- 1990: Hamilton (NY) (assistant)
- 1991–1996: Northeastern (assistant)

Baseball
- 1990–1991: Hamilton (NY) (assistant)
- 1991–1996: Northeastern (assistant)
- 1997–1998: Trinity (TX)
- 1999–2006: Boston College
- 2007–2013: Virginia Tech
- 2014–2017: Oklahoma
- 2018: Georgia (volunteer assistant)
- 2019–present: Kansas State

Head coaching record
- Overall: 851–658–3

Accomplishments and honors

Championships
- SCAC Eastern Division (1998)

Awards
- 2× Big East Coach of the Year: 2000, 2002

Pete Hughes (born January 11, 1968) is an American college baseball coach and head coach of the Kansas State Wildcats baseball team. Hughes is the winningest active Big 12 head baseball coach with 852 career victories and only active NCAA baseball coach to have served as a head coach at four Power 4 programs. Previously he served as the head coach of the Oklahoma Sooners baseball, Virginia Tech Hokies baseball, and the Boston College Eagles baseball team.

== Playing career ==
After growing up in Brockton, Massachusetts, Hughes attended Boston College High School, lettering in both baseball and football for the Eagles. Hughes then was a four-year starting quarterback at Davidson College. He also played third base for the Wildcats baseball team.

== Coaching career ==
After completing college, Hughes became an assistant coach for both baseball and football at Hamilton College. He stayed there for one academic year before moving to Northeastern in the same dual capacity. After five years, he decided to focus on baseball and landed his first head coaching job at Trinity University in Texas. Taking just two seasons to improve the Tigers to a conference championship, Hughes was hired by Boston College after the 1998 season. His success with the Eagles was also immediate, improving Boston College's record by nine wins in his first year. Hughes picked up a variety of Coach of the Year awards in his second season, including awards from the Big East Conference and regional selectors of the American Baseball Coaches Association. He would earn more such honors in 2002 and 2005. He also led the Eagles to the Big East Conference baseball tournament five times in seven years. Boston College had only appeared in the tournament once prior to his arrival.

Hughes was hired as head coach at Virginia Tech beginning in the 2007 season, replacing Hall of Famer Chuck Hartman, who had led the Hokies for the previous 28 years. Hughes has rebuilt the Hokies into a power, bringing the team back into the national rankings and to the Atlantic Coast Conference baseball tournament on a regular basis. Hughes earned a three-year contract extension after the 2009 season. He was hired by the Oklahoma Sooners in 2014. He was let go by the Sooners in June 2017. On July 31, 2017, Hughes was named volunteer assistant at Georgia. On June 8, 2018, Hughes was named the head coach of the Kansas State Wildcats baseball team.

== Head coaching record ==
Record table
Season	Team	Overall	Conference	Standing	Postseason
Trinity Tigers (Southern Collegiate Athletic Conference) (1997–1998)
1997	Trinity (TX)	19–19	9–8	2nd (West)	
1998	Trinity (TX)	33–11	15–3	1st (West)	
Trinity (TX):		52–30 (.634)	24–11 (.686)		
Boston College Eagles (Big East Conference) (1999–2005)
1999	Boston College	26–21–1	10–15–1	9th	
2000	Boston College	35–20	12–11	5th	Big East tournament
2001	Boston College	29–22	11–13	8th	
2002	Boston College	30–25	15–11	T–3rd	Big East tournament
2003	Boston College	33–21	13–11	5th	
2004	Boston College	32–27	15–9	4th	Big East tournament
2005	Boston College	37–20	17–8	2nd	Big East tournament
Boston College Eagles (Atlantic Coast Conference) (2006)
2006	Boston College	28–25–1	9–21	5th (Atlantic)	
Boston College:		250–181–2 (.580)	102–99–1 (.507)		
Virginia Tech Hokies (Atlantic Coast Conference) (2007–2013)
2007	Virginia Tech	23–31	4–25	6th (Coastal)	
2008	Virginia Tech	23–32	6–24	6th (Coastal)	
2009	Virginia Tech	32–21	12–17	6th (Coastal)	
2010	Virginia Tech	40–22	16–14	4th (Coastal)	NCAA Regional
2011	Virginia Tech	30–25	11–19	5th (Coastal)	
2012	Virginia Tech	34–21	11–19	5th (Coastal)	
2013	Virginia Tech	40–22	15–14	3rd (Coastal)	NCAA Regional
Virginia Tech:		222–174 (.561)	75–132 (.362)		
Oklahoma Sooners (Big 12 Conference) (2014–2017)
2014	Oklahoma	29–29	8–16	8th	Big 12 tournament
2015	Oklahoma	34–27	13–11	T–3rd	Big 12 tournament
2016	Oklahoma	30–27–1	11–13	5th	Big 12 tournament
2017	Oklahoma	35–24	12–11	3rd	NCAA Regional
Oklahoma:		128–107–1 (.544)	43–51 (.457)		
Kansas State Wildcats (Big 12 Conference) (2019–present)
2019	Kansas State	25–33	8–16	8th	Big 12 tournament
2020	Kansas State	10–7	0–0		Season canceled due to COVID-19
2021	Kansas State	34–23	10–14	7th	Big 12 tournament
2022	Kansas State	29–29	8–16	7th	Big 12 tournament
2023	Kansas State	35–24	13–11	5th	Big 12 tournament
2024	Kansas State	35–26	15–15	T–6th	NCAA Super Regional
2025	Kansas State	32-26	17–13	6th	NCAA Regional
2026	Kansas State	30-27	11–19	11th	Big 12 tournament
Kansas State:		230–195 (.541)	82–104 (.441)		
Total:		882–687–3 (.562)			
National champion Postseason invitational champion Conference regular season champion Conference regular season and conference tournament champion Division regular season champion Division regular season and conference tournament champion Conference tournament champion

== See also ==
- List of current NCAA Division I baseball coaches
