= Chris Heintz (baseball) =

American baseball player (born 1974)

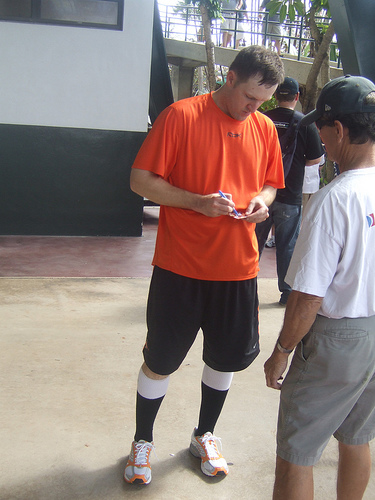
- Catcher
- Born: August 6, 1974 (age 51); Syosset, New York, U.S.
- Batted: Right Threw: Right

MLB debut
- September 10, 2005, for the Minnesota Twins

Last MLB appearance
- September 26, 2007, for the Minnesota Twins

MLB statistics
- Batting average: .232
- Hits: 19
- Runs batted in: 9
- Stats at Baseball Reference

Teams
- Minnesota Twins (2005–2007)

Christopher John Heintz (born August 6, 1974) is an American former professional baseball catcher. He played in Major League Baseball (MLB) with the Minnesota Twins from 2005–2007. He is currently a hitting coach for the Florida Complex League affiliate of the Philadelphia Phillies. He is the brother of PGA Tour golfer Bob Heintz.

== College career ==
Heintz attended the University of South Florida, where he played baseball for the Bulls. While at South Florida, he was named to the All-Tournament Team of the 1996 Conference USA baseball tournament, in which South Florida finished second. He is a member of the USF Athletic Hall of Fame.

== Minor League career ==
Heintz was drafted by the Chicago White Sox as a catcher in the 19th round of the 1996 Major League Baseball draft. After six seasons in their farm system, the ChiSox released Heintz. He signed with the St. Louis Cardinals in 2002, and spent the season with their Eastern League double A affiliate, the New Haven Ravens. At the end of the season, he became a rule 55 free agent, and signed with the Pittsburgh Pirates, and spent 2003 with the Altoona Curve, also in the Eastern League.

== MLB debut ==
He signed with the Minnesota Twins following the season, and spent 2004 and 2005 with their triple A affiliate, the Rochester Red Wings. His .304 batting average, eight home runs and 58 runs batted in in 2005 was good enough for a September call-up, and he made his major league debut on September 10, 2005, replacing Mike Redmond in the eighth inning of a 7–5 loss to the Cleveland Indians at Jacobs Field.

Heintz spent the next two seasons with Rochester making the occasional appearances with the major league roster. The Twins released Heintz following the 2007 season. He signed with the Baltimore Orioles for 2008. After one season with their triple A affiliate, the Norfolk Tides, Heintz retired. In 199.1 major league innings caught, Heintz had a 1.000 fielding percentage.

== Coaching ==
During the 2009 season, Heintz began coaching with the Twins' Midwest League affiliate, the Beloit Snappers. On October 20, 2009, he replaced Jake Mauer as manager of the Gulf Coast League Twins. He also ran the Twins' extended Spring Training that year.

At the start of the 2010 season, the South Florida Bulls baseball team hired Heintz as an assistant coach.

Heintz was named as the hitting coach for the GCL Phillies for the 2018 season.

In 2026, Heintz was named as the hitting coach for the Clearwater Threshers the Single-A affiliate of the Philadelphia Phillies.
