= 1996 Trans America Athletic Conference baseball tournament =

American college baseball tournament

- Teams: 6
- Format: Double-elimination
- Finals site: Conrad Park; DeLand, Florida
- Champions: UCF (3rd title)
- Winning coach: Jay Bergman (3rd title)
- MVP: Nick Presto (Florida Atlantic)

1996 Trans America Athletic Conference baseball standings
| | Conf. | | | | Overall |
| Team | W | | L | PCT | W | | L | PCT |
|---|---|---|---|---|---|---|---|---|
South
| No. 22 Stetson ^{x}‍†‍‍^{y} | 12 | – | 6 | .667 | 42 | – | 23 | .646 |
| UCF ‍‍‡‍^{y} | 9 | – | 9 | .500 | 43 | – | 22 | .662 |
| Florida Atlantic ‍‍‍ | 9 | – | 9 | .500 | 39 | – | 23 | .629 |
| FIU ‍‍‍ | 6 | – | 12 | .333 | 35 | – | 24 | .593 |
East
| Georgia State ^{x}‍†‍‍ | 12 | – | 6 | .667 | 21 | – | 32 | .396 |
| Campbell ‍‍‍ | 9 | – | 9 | .500 | 23 | – | 33 | .411 |
| College of Charleston ‍‍‍ | 8 | – | 10 | .444 | 28 | – | 23 | .549 |
| Mercer ‍‍‍ | 7 | – | 11 | .389 | 25 | – | 30 | .455 |
West
| Jacksonville State ^{x}‍†‍‍ | 12 | – | 6 | .667 | 33 | – | 18 | .647 |
| Southeastern Louisiana ‍‍‍ | 11 | – | 7 | .611 | 34 | – | 24 | .586 |
| Centenary ‍‍‍ | 7 | – | 11 | .389 | 23 | – | 34 | .404 |
| Samford ‍‍‍ | 6 | – | 12 | .333 | 22 | – | 34 | .393 |
x – Division champion † – Conference champion ‡ – Tournament champion y – Invited to the NCAA tournament As of June 30, 1996; Rankings from Collegiate Baseball

The 1996 Trans America Athletic Conference baseball tournament was held at Conrad Park on the campus of Stetson in DeLand, Florida. This was the eighteenth tournament championship held by the Trans America Athletic Conference. UCF won their third tournament championship in four years, and second of three in a row, and earned the conference's automatic bid to the 1996 NCAA Division I baseball tournament.

== Format and seeding ==
The top six finishers by overall winning percentage qualified for the tournament, with the top seed playing the lowest seed in the first round.

| Team | W | L | Pct. | Seed |
|---|---|---|---|---|
South
| Stetson | 39 | 19 | .672 | 1 |
| UCF | 38 | 20 | .655 | 4 |
| Florida Atlantic | 36 | 21 | .632 | 5 |
| FIU | 34 | 22 | .607 | 6 |

| Team | W | L | Pct. | Seed |
|---|---|---|---|---|
East
| Georgia State | 21 | 32 | .396 | — |
| Campbell | 23 | 33 | .411 | — |
| College of Charleston | 28 | 23 | .549 | — |
| Mercer | 25 | 30 | .455 | — |

| Team | W | L | Pct. | Seed |
|---|---|---|---|---|
West
| Jacksonville State | 33 | 16 | .673 | 2 |
| Southeastern Louisiana | 34 | 22 | .607 | 3 |
| Centenary | 23 | 34 | .404 | — |
| Samford | 22 | 34 | .393 | — |

== Bracket ==
First round
1 | Stetson | 5
6 | FIU | 3
3 | Southeastern Louisiana | 1
4 | UCF | 2
2 | Jacksonville State | 7
5 | Florida Atlantic | 11

Second round
1 | Stetson | 13
3 | Southeastern Louisiana | 9
4 | UCF | 3
5 | Florida Atlantic | 1
6 | FIU | 10
2 | Jacksonville State | 8

Third round
1 | Stetson | 3
4 | UCF | 6
5 | Florida Atlantic | 4^{10}
6 | FIU | 3

Semifinals
1 | Stetson | 5
5 | Florida Atlantic | 8

Final
3 | UCF | 6 | —
5 | Florida Atlantic | 2 | —

== All-Tournament Team ==
The following players were named to the All-Tournament Team.

| POS | Player | School |
|---|---|---|
| P | Marco Ramirez | UCF |
| P | Mike Lyons | Stetson |
| C | Brad King | UCF |
| IF | Brooks Stephens | Stetson |
| IF | Mike Garner | Jacksonville State |
| IF | Kevin Connacher | Florida Atlantic |
| IF | Garry Kamphouse | Florida Atlantic |
| IF | Nick Presto | Florida Atlantic |
| IF | Bryan Bruce | UCF |
| OF | Clint Hendry | Stetson |
| OF | Sean Mahoney | FIU |
| OF | Rich Ozarowski | Florida Atlantic |
| DH | Scott Loubier | UCF |

=== Most Valuable Player ===
Nick Presto was named Tournament Most Valuable Player. Presto was an infielder for Florida Atlantic.
