= Golden State League =

The Golden State League was an Independent Baseball league that operated in California from 1994 to 1996.

The league had originally targeted eight teams and considered 10-12 potential sites, they were Chico; Fresno; Henderson, Nevada; Lodi; Long Beach; Merced; Oceanside; Oxnard; Palm Springs; Redding; Rohnert Park; Sacramento; San Luis Obispo; Santa Barbara; St. George, Utah; Yuba City; and Yuma, Arizona.

However, it eventually started play with only four teams. These were the Imperial Valley Brahmas in Brawley, California and El Centro, California; the Antelope Valley Ravens in Lancaster, California and Palmdale, California; the Yuma Desert Dawgs moved to the Western Baseball League the following year (1996); and a traveling team, the Sierra Nevada/Southern Nomadic Miners, represented both Bishop, California (Sierra Nevada), and the Palm Springs area (Southern Nomadic). One team was supposed to play in Indio, California as the Indio Lil' Devils, but the city lacked a standard ball park and the team's operations had moved to Yuma. Another failed team, the San Luis Obispo Knights in Paso Robles, California, never surfaced.

Planning for the league started in 1993. Golden State immediately faced obstacles in securing municipal financing, ballparks, and subsidies for new teams, as well as entrenched competition from the California League. Plagued by financial difficulties, the season opener was postponed several times from the original target date of March 31, 1995. The league folded just one week after its opening game held on June 16, 1995, in Yuma. The Ravens continued to play as a member of the later-folded Southwest Baseball League with teams in Arizona, Colorado, Nevada, New Mexico and Utah with the rest of home games in the Speedway Ballpark in Rosamond, California.

Like most independent leagues, Golden State rosters included a mix of high school and college stars and big leaguers looking to extend their careers. Ex-major leaguers associated with Golden State included pitcher Scott Taylor (Antelope Valley), formerly of the Red Sox, and Gold Glove and all-star outfielder Ellis Valentine (manager Antelope Valley).

== See also ==
Independent baseball
