= Scott Hemond =

American baseball player (born 1965)

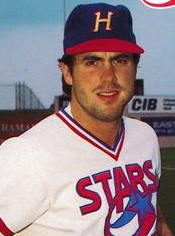
- Catcher
- Born: November 18, 1965 (age 60); Taunton, Massachusetts, U.S.
- Batted: Right Threw: Right

MLB debut
- September 9, 1989, for the Oakland Athletics

Last MLB appearance
- September 29, 1995, for the St. Louis Cardinals

MLB statistics
- Batting average: .217
- Home runs: 12
- Runs batted in: 58
- Stats at Baseball Reference

Teams
- Oakland Athletics (1989–1992); Chicago White Sox (1992); Oakland Athletics (1993–1994); St. Louis Cardinals (1995)

Scott Mathew Hemond (born November 18, 1965) is an American former professional baseball catcher. He played in Major League Baseball (MLB) from 1989-1995 for the Oakland Athletics, Chicago White Sox, and St. Louis Cardinals.

== Amateur career ==
Scott was drafted in the 5th round by the Kansas City Royals out of Dunedin High School, where his number "11" was retired, but elected to attend college to pursue his education and college baseball career.

Hemond played collegiate baseball for the University of South Florida where his number "11" was again retired. Hemond was a 2 time All-American, played on the highest ranked baseball team in USF history. In 1984, he played collegiate summer baseball for the Hyannis Mets of the Cape Cod Baseball League (CCBL). He returned to the league in 1986 with the Harwich Mariners. Hemond led the CCBL in batting in 1986 (.358), and was named league MVP. He was inducted into the CCBL Hall of Fame in 2007. In1985 Scott played for the USA Baseball Team. In 1986 Hemond was "USF Male Athlete of the Year" and finalist for the "Golden Spikes Award". According to Jim Louk, voice of the USF Athletics, as a junior catcher, Scott was rated the sixth best prospect in all of college baseball by one pre-season publication.

== Professional career ==
In 1986, Hemond was drafted in the 1st round (12th pick) by the Oakland Athletics, where he played 7 seasons in the Major League as a utility player, playing every position at the MLB level except shortstop and pitcher.
