= 1996 Big West Conference baseball tournament =

American college baseball tournament

- Teams: 4
- Format: Double-elimination tournament
- Finals site: Titan Field; Fullerton, CA
- Champions: UNLV (1st title)
- Winning coach: Fred Dallimore (1st title)

1996 Big West Conference baseball standings
	Conf.				Overall
Team	W		L	PCT	W		L	PCT
Long Beach State ‍†‍‍	15	–	6	.714	34	–	26	.567
No. 26 UNLV ‍‍‡‍	14	–	7	.667	43	–	17	.717
UC Santa Barbara ‍‍‍	14	–	7	.667	32	–	20	.615
No. 13 Cal State Fullerton ‍‍‍	13	–	8	.619	42	–	16	.724
Nevada ‍‍‍	8	–	13	.381	28	–	18	.609
New Mexico State ‍‍‍	8	–	13	.381	25	–	27	.481
San Jose State ‍‍‍	7	–	14	.333	28	–	28	.500
Pacific ‍‍‍	5	–	16	.238	24	–	25	.490
† – Conference champion ‡ – Tournament champion y – Invited to the 1996 NCAA Division I baseball tournament As of June 30, 1996; Rankings from Collegiate Baseball

The 1996 Big West Conference baseball tournament determined the conference champion for the Big West Conference at the end of the 1996 season. The teams met from May 10 through 12 at Cal State Fullerton's on campus stadium, Titan Field.

== Seeding and format ==
The top four teams at the end of the conference's round robin regular season were seeded one through four based on conference winning percentage, with head to head matchups used as a tiebreaker. UNLV claimed the season series over UC Santa Barbara, and therefore was seeded second.

Team	W	L	PCT	GB	Seed
Long Beach State	15	6	.714	–	1
UNLV	14	7	.667	1	2
UC Santa Barbara	14	7	.667	1	3
Cal State Fullerton	13	8	.619	2	4
Nevada	8	13	.381	7	–
New Mexico State	8	13	.381	7	–
San Jose State	7	14	.238	8	–
Pacific	5	16	.238	10	–

== Bracket ==
The following bracket depicts the results of the tournament.

Upper round 1
1	Long Beach State	1
4	Cal State Fullerton	3
2	UNLV	6
3	UC Santa Barbara	3
Lower round 1
1	Long Beach State	2
3	UC Santa Barbara	1

Upper final
4	Cal State Fullerton	8
2	UNLV	9
Lower final
4	Cal State Fullerton	9
1	Long Beach State	13

Final
2	UNLV
1	Long Beach State
