= 1996 Mid-Continent Conference baseball tournament =

- Teams: 4
- Format: Double-elimination
- Finals site: Riddle–Pace Field; Troy, Alabama
- Champions: Northeastern Illinois (1st title)
- Winning coach: Jim Hawrysko (1st title)
- MVP: Matt Dunne (Northeastern Illinois)

1996 Mid-Continent Conference baseball standings
	Conf.						Overall
Team	W		L		T	PCT	W		L		T	PCT
East
Troy State ^{x}‍‍‍	16	–	2	–	0	.889	41	–	13	–	0	.759
Pace ‍‍‍	10	–	10	–	0	.500	20	–	28	–	0	.417
Youngstown State ‍‍‍	10	–	10	–	0	.500	20	–	25	–	0	.444
NYIT ‍‍‍	8	–	12	–	0	.400	20	–	25	–	0	.444
C.W. Post ‍‍‍	7	–	11	–	0	.389	15	–	24	–	1	.388
Central Connecticut ‍‍‍	7	–	13	–	0	.350	17	–	25	–	1	.407
West
Eastern Illinois ^{x}‍‍‍	15	–	3	–	0	.833	24	–	22	–	0	.522
Northeastern Illinois ‍‍‡‍^{y}	12	–	12	–	0	.500	31	–	29	–	0	.517
Valparaiso ‍‍‍	9	–	11	–	0	.450	18	–	29	–	0	.383
Western Illinois ‍‍‍	9	–	13	–	0	.409	14	–	27	–	0	.341
Chicago State ‍‍‍	7	–	13	–	0	.350	20	–	28	–	1	.418
‡ – Tournament champion y – Invited to the NCAA tournament As of June 30, 1996; Rankings from Collegiate Baseball

The 1996 Mid-Continent Conference Tournament took place from May 10 through 11. The top two regular season finishers of each of the league's two divisions met in the double-elimination tournament held at Riddle–Pace Field on the campus of Troy State University in Troy, Alabama. Northeastern Illinois won the tournament for the first time.

== Format and seeding ==
The top two teams from each division advanced to the tournament.

East Division
Team	W	L	Pct.	GB	Seed
Troy State	16	2	.889	—	1E
Pace	10	10	.500	7	2E
Youngstown State	10	10	.500	7	—
NYIT	8	12	.400	9	—
C.W. Post	7	11	.389	9	—
Central Connecticut	7	13	.350	10	—

West Division
Team	W	L	Pct.	GB	Seed
Eastern Illinois	15	3	.833	—	1W
Northeastern Illinois	12	12	.500	6	2W
Valparaiso	9	11	.450	7	—
Western Illinois	9	13	.409	8	—
Chicago State	7	13	.350	9	—

== Tournament ==
Upper round 1
1E	Troy State	7
2W	Northeastern Illinois	8
1W	Eastern Illinois	1
2E	Pace	5
Lower round 1
1E	Troy State	9
1W	Eastern Illinois	5

Upper final
2W	Northeastern Illinois	14
2E	Pace	5
Lower final
2E	Pace	6
1E	Troy State	12

Final
2W	Northeastern Illinois	3
1E	Troy State	0

=== Game-by-game results ===
Game	Winner	Score	Loser	Comment
1	(2E) Pace	5–1	(1W) Eastern Illinois	
2	(2W) Northeastern Illinois	8–7	(1E) Troy State	
3	(1E) Troy State	9–5	(1W) Eastern Illinois	Eastern Illinois eliminated
4	(2W) Northeastern Illinois	14–5	(2E) Pace	
5	(1E) Troy State	12–6	(2E) Pace	Pace eliminated
6	(2W) Northeastern Illinois	3–0	(1E) Troy State	Northeastern Illinois wins Mid-Con Championship

== All-Tournament Team ==
Name	School
Peter Bezeredi	Troy
Rob Bruce	Northeastern Illinois
Frank Chibbaro	Pace
Phil Ciccone	Pace
Chad Dubé	Troy
Matt Dunne	Northeastern Illinois
Scott D’Ottavio	Pace
Jim Jasper	Northeastern Illinois
Bob Kostuch	Northeastern Illinois
Matt Majcherek	Northeastern Illinois
Tom Panzica	Northeastern Illinois
Josh Zink	Eastern Illinois

=== Tournament Most Valuable Player ===
Matt Dunne of Northeastern Illinois was named Tournament MVP.
