= Ed Wheeler (1940s infielder) =

American baseball player (1915–1983)

- Third baseman
- Born: May 24, 1915; Los Angeles, California, U.S.
- Died: August 4, 1983 (aged 68); Centralia, Washington, U.S.
- Batted: Right Threw: Right

MLB debut
- April 19, 1945, for the Cleveland Indians

Last MLB appearance
- September 22, 1945, for the Cleveland Indians

MLB statistics
- Batting average: .194
- Home runs: 0
- Runs batted in: 2
- Stats at Baseball Reference

Teams
- Cleveland Indians (1945)

Edward Raymond Wheeler (May 24, 1915 – August 4, 1983) was an American Major League Baseball infielder who played for one season. He played in 46 games for the Cleveland Indians during the 1945 Cleveland Indians season, splitting time as a third baseman and shortstop. He was born in Los Angeles and he died in Centralia, Washington.
