= South Florida Bulls baseball =

- 2026 South Florida Bulls baseball team
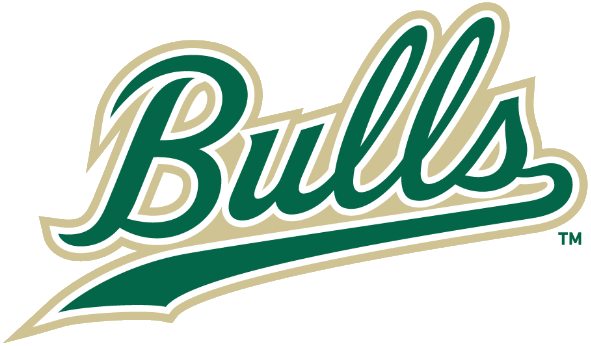
- Founded: 1966; 60 years ago
- University: University of South Florida
- Athletic director: Rob Higgins
- Head coach: Mitch Hannahs (2nd season)
- Conference: The American
- Location: Tampa, Florida, U.S.
- Home stadium: USF Baseball Stadium (capacity: 3,211)
- Nickname: Bulls
- Colors: Green and gold

NCAA regional champions
- 2021

NCAA tournament appearances
- 1982, 1986, 1989, 1990, 1993, 1995, 1996, 1997, 2001, 2002, 2015, 2017, 2018, 2021

Conference tournament champions
- 1982, 1986, 1990, 1995, 2021

Conference regular season champions
- 1982, 1986, 1989, 1993, 1995, 1996

The South Florida Bulls baseball team is the intercollegiate men's baseball program representing the University of South Florida in Tampa, Florida. The team competes in the American Conference of NCAA Division I. Founded in 1966, the baseball team is one of the oldest teams at the university. The Bulls have captured eleven conference titles (six regular season and five tournament) and 14 NCAA tournament appearances. The team plays their home games on campus at USF Baseball Stadium at Red McEwen Field and are coached by Mitch Hannahs.

== History ==
=== Beefy Wright era ===
The baseball team was founded in spring 1966 as one of the original varsity sports teams at USF. Beefy Wright was the first coach of the team. They played most home games during their first season at Al Lopez Field in West Tampa, around 12 miles from campus, but some games were played at Cuscaden Field in Tampa's Ybor City neighborhood. The Bulls first played as independents in the NCAA College Division, now known as Division II. For their second season the team started playing at a new on-campus stadium originally known as USF Baseball Field, and later called Red McEwen Field.

Though the team had winning records in five of their first eight seasons, they were never selected for the NCAA tournament. In 1973, the final season in the College Division, second baseman Mike Campbell was named the first All-American in program history. They moved to NCAA Division I beginning in 1974. On March 8, 1974, just the sixth game for the team since joining Division I, Steve Ruling threw the first no-hitter in USF baseball history to complete a sweep against UConn. Beefy Wright left the school after the 1974 season, and was replaced by Jack Butterfield.

=== Jack Butterfield era ===
Despite only coaching the team for two seasons, Jack Butterfield led the Bulls to their two best records ever up to that point. To this day, Butterfield has the best winning percentage of any USF baseball coach (.715). He left after the 1976 season to become a scout for the New York Yankees.

=== Robin Roberts era ===
Robin Roberts took over the team in 1977. Roberts had been inducted into the National Baseball Hall of Fame the year prior for his 18-year MLB pitching career, most notably with the Philadelphia Phillies. In 1978, the school's first season in the Sun Belt Conference, he was named the Sun Belt coach of the year. He would be given this honor again in 1980, 1981, and 1982. In 1982, Roberts' Bulls won the regular season and tournament Sun Belt titles, the first two conference titles for the baseball team. This came after a season in which the Bulls went 45–13 (a .776 win percentage), which stands to this day as their best-ever record. They qualified for their first NCAA tournament, where they lost in the regional round to eventual national champion Miami.

Roberts would coach the Bulls until his retirement in 1985. In a ceremony before his final game, Roberts had his number 36 jersey retired by the team and honored on the outfield wall. He was the first to have his number retired by the USF baseball team.

=== Eddie Cardieri era ===
Eddie Cardieri, an assistant under Roberts since the 1983 season, was promoted to be Roberts' replacement for 1986. He immediately found success, and the Bulls won the regular season and tournament Sun Belt titles in his first season, while Cardieri was named Sun Belt coach of the year. In the regional final of the 1986 NCAA tournament, they lost to eventual national runner-up Florida State.

The Bulls next qualified for the NCAA tournament in 1989 following a regular season Sun Belt championship. They were once again eliminated in the regional round by Florida State, who would end up in the semifinal of the College World Series. The following season, the Bulls made it to the NCAA tournament for the third time in their history after winning both the regular season and tournament Sun Belt titles again, and Cardieri was again named the Sun Belt coach of the year. These would be their last Sun Belt titles as they moved to the Metro Conference beginning with the next season.

Against Charlotte on May 9, 1992, USF's Mark Reed threw the first and only perfect game in USF baseball history. The Bulls won the first and only title of their short stint in the Metro Conference with the 1993 regular season conference championship. Cardieri was named as the Metro Conference coach of the year for that season, and the Bulls were given an at-large bid for the NCAA tournament.

The Metro Conference merged with the Great Midwest Conference to form Conference USA beginning in the 1995 season. USF won the regular season and tournament titles for the inaugural year of the new conference, and appeared in the first of three straight NCAA tournaments. They appeared in the NCAA tournament again in 2001 and 2002 before moving from Conference USA to the Big East Conference in 2005.

Eddie Cardieri resigned after a 23–35 season in 2006, his 21st year with the Bulls. He stands today as by far the winningest coach in USF baseball history with 731 victories (Robin Roberts, the next winningest coach in team history, only had 262 wins).

=== Lelo Prado era ===
Louisville head coach Lelo Prado, who grew up in Tampa, was hired by USF to fill Cardieri's shoes for the 2007 season. He formerly played and coached for the Division II University of Tampa and led them to two national titles as coach. Despite the Bulls posting winning records in five of Prado's eight seasons (including 2009 when Prado was Big East coach of the year), they never won a conference title or appeared in an NCAA tournament. Prado stepped down to an advisory role following the 2014 season, and in 2018 became an assistant athletic director at USF.

=== Mark Kingston era ===
Illinois State head coach Mark Kingston was hired as Prado's replacement. In 2015, his first season, he brought the Bulls back to the NCAA tournament for the first time since 2002. In 2017, he did it again on top of the team earning their best record in over 20 years. He left to become the head coach at South Carolina after the 2017 season.

=== Billy Mohl era ===
USF pitching coach Billy Mohl was promoted to the head coaching job beginning in 2018. He brought the Bulls to the NCAA tournament in his first season. In 2021, his Bulls were predicted to finish last of the eight teams in the American Athletic Conference in the annual media day poll, and ended the regular season in sixth. The team got hot at the perfect time, however, and reached the championship game of the AAC tournament where they defeated rival Central Florida for their first conference title in 25 years. They stayed hot in the NCAA tournament and defeated powerhouses Florida and Miami in the Gainesville Regional to qualify for their first-ever Super Regional, where they lost to No. 2 Texas. Two years later however, after losing most of the notable members of the 2021 Super Regional team to the MLB draft, the Bulls had their worst season since their inaugural year with a record of just 21–39. Mohl was fired after the 2024 season.

=== Mitch Hannahs era ===
Former Indiana State head coach Mitch Hannahs was hired to replace Billy Mohl.

== South Florida in the NCAA Tournament ==
Year	Record	Pct	Notes
1982	1–2	.333	Atlantic Regional
1986	2–2	.500	South II Regional
1989	0–2	.000	Atlantic Regional
1990	0–2	.000	Atlantic Regional
1993	0–2	.000	East Regional
1995	0–2	.000	Atlantic II Regional
1996	2–2	.500	East Regional
1997	2–2	.500	East Regional
2001	1–2	.333	Wilson Regional
2002	2–2	.500	Tallahassee Regional
2015	1–2	.333	Gainesville Regional
2017	1–2	.333	Gainesville Regional
2018	1–2	.333	DeLand Regional
2021	3–2	.600	Gainesville Regional Champions, Austin Super Regional
TOTALS	16–28	.364	

== USF Baseball Stadium ==
Opened in 2012 on the same site as the former stadium, Red McEwen Field, the USF Baseball Stadium is a 1,500-seat facility with the potential to hold a capacity crowd of 3,211.

== Season-by-season results ==
Year	Conference	Games played	Record	Win percentage	Conference record	Head coach	Postseason
1966	Independent (National Collegiate)	15	4–11	.267	N/A	Beefy Wright	
1967	Independent (National Collegiate)	22	14–8	.636	N/A	Beefy Wright	
1968	Independent (College Division)	24	15–9	.625	N/A	Beefy Wright	
1969	Independent (College Division)	33	18–15	.545	N/A	Beefy Wright	
1970	Independent (College Division)	30	14–15–1	.483	N/A	Beefy Wright	
1971	Independent (College Division)	33	12–21	.364	N/A	Beefy Wright	
1972	Independent (College Division)	34	18–16	.529	N/A	Beefy Wright	
1973	Independent (College Division)	39	23–16	.590	N/A	Beefy Wright	
1974	Independent (Division I)	38	21–16–1	.566	N/A	Beefy Wright	
1975	Independent (Division I)	41	29–12	.707	N/A	Jack Butterfield	
1976	Independent (Division I)	45	32–12–1	.721	N/A	Jack Butterfield	
1977	Independent (Division I)	50	25–25	.500	N/A	Robin Roberts	
1978	Sun Belt Conference	52	25–26–1	.490	4–3	Robin Roberts	
1979	Sun Belt Conference	53	28–25	.528	4–2	Robin Roberts	
1980	Sun Belt Conference	62	28–34	.452	3–2	Robin Roberts	
1981	Sun Belt Conference	53	21–32	.396	5–3	Robin Roberts	
**1982**	Sun Belt Conference	58	45–13	.776	**6–2**	Robin Roberts	NCAA Regionals
1983	Sun Belt Conference	53	19–34	.358	4–12	Robin Roberts	
1984	Sun Belt Conference	60	35–25	.583	8–8	Robin Roberts	
1985	Sun Belt Conference	70	44–26	.629	10–8	Robin Roberts	
**1986**	Sun Belt Conference	68	52–16	.765	**15–3**	Eddie Cardieri	NCAA Regionals
1987	Sun Belt Conference	70	44–26	.629	10–8	Eddie Cardieri	
1988	Sun Belt Conference	59	26–33	.441	5–11	Eddie Cardieri	
1989	Sun Belt Conference	63	45–18	.714	13–5	Eddie Cardieri	NCAA Regionals
**1990**	Sun Belt Conference	65	41–24	.631	**8–10**	Eddie Cardieri	NCAA Regionals
1991	Metro Conference	60	34–26	.567	4–14	Eddie Cardieri	
1992	Metro Conference	58	27–31	.466	7–11	Eddie Cardieri	
1993	Metro Conference	60	40–20	.667	13–5	Eddie Cardieri	NCAA Regionals
1994	Metro Conference	58	39–19	.672	11–7	Eddie Cardieri	
**1995**	Conference USA	63	38–25	.603	**11–7**	Eddie Cardieri	NCAA Regionals
1996	Conference USA	66	47–19	.712	20–4	Eddie Cardieri	NCAA Regionals
1997	Conference USA	63	39–24	.619	18–8	Eddie Cardieri	NCAA Regionals
1998	Conference USA	57	21–36	.368	9–18	Eddie Cardieri	
1999	Conference USA	58	31–27	.534	15–12	Eddie Cardieri	
2000	Conference USA	58	29–29	.500	14–13	Eddie Cardieri	
2001	Conference USA	64	33–31	.516	16–11	Eddie Cardieri	NCAA Regionals
2002	Conference USA	64	35–29	.547	16–14	Eddie Cardieri	NCAA Regionals
2003	Conference USA	58	31–27	.534	14–14	Eddie Cardieri	
2004	Conference USA	55	31–24	.564	12–17	Eddie Cardieri	
2005	Big East	64	33–31	.516	15–14	Eddie Cardieri	
2006	Big East	58	23–35	.397	12–15	Eddie Cardieri	
2007	Big East	60	34–26	.567	13–14	Lelo Prado	
2008	Big East	58	31–27	.534	14–13	Lelo Prado	
2009	Big East	59	34–25	.576	19–9	Lelo Prado	
2010	Big East	58	26–32	.448	16–11	Lelo Prado	
2011	Big East	54	25–29	.463	13–14	Lelo Prado	
2012	Big East	60	38–22	.633	18–11	Lelo Prado	
2013	Big East	58	36–22	.621	17–7	Lelo Prado	
2014	American Conference	58	27–31	.466	10–14	Lelo Prado	
2015	American Conference	61	34–26–1	.566	13–11	Mark Kingston	NCAA Regionals
2016	American Conference	57	24–33	.421	8–16	Mark Kingston	
2017	American Conference	61	42–19	.689	14–10	Mark Kingston	NCAA Regionals
2018	American Conference	59	36–22–1	.619	14–9–1	Billy Mohl	NCAA Regionals
2019	American Conference	53	26–27	.491	8–16	Billy Mohl	
2020	American Conference	17	6–11	.353	0–0	Billy Mohl	Season cut short due to COVID-19 pandemic
**2021**	American Conference	61	31–30	.508	**14–14**	Billy Mohl	NCAA Super Regionals
2022	American Conference	57	28–29	.491	8–16	Billy Mohl	
2023	American Conference	60	21–39	.350	7–17	Billy Mohl	
Total		3105	1708-1391-6	.551	508–463–1		14 Appearances
Bold indicates tournament won Italics indicate Conference Championship

== Individuals ==
=== Players ===
==== Perfect Games ====
There has been one perfect game thrown in USF history:

- Mark Reed, May 9, 1992, vs Charlotte

==== No Hitters ====
Bulls pitchers have thrown three no hitters in school history (not including Reed's perfect game):

- Steve Ruling, March 8, 1974, vs UConn
- Randy Fontanez, March 26, 2010 vs Notre Dame
- Shane McClanahan and Carson Ragsdale, March 16, 2017, vs Army

==== Major Leaguers ====
South Florida has produced 127 players drafted into Major League Baseball including four first round selections. 19 of these players have gone on to play in the MLB, including two active players.

- David Villar - 3B (2022–Present)
- Shane McClanahan – LHP (2020–Present)
- Phoenix Sanders - RHP ( 2022-Present )
- Austin Adams – RHP (2017–Present)
- Dan Otero – RHP (2012–2019)
- Kevin Quackenbush – RHP (2014–2018)
- Ross Gload – 1B/OF (2000–2011)
- Jeff Baisley – 1B/3B (2008)
- Chris Heintz – C (2005–2007), current Gulf Coast League Phillies hitting coach
- Dave Eiland – RHP (1988–2000), current Kansas City Royals pitching coach
- Jason Dellaero – SS (1999)
- Tony Fossas – LHP (1988–1999), current Daytona Tortugas pitching coach
- Fred Rath Jr. – RHP (1998)
- Scott Hemond – INF (1989–1995)
- Tim Hulett – INF (1983–1995), current head baseball coach at Evangel Christian Academy in Shreveport, Louisiana
- Derek Lee – OF (1993)
- Chris Welsh – LHP (1981–1986), current Cincinnati Reds color commentator
- Ben Hayes – RHP (1982–1983), current league president of the New York–Penn League
- Eric Soderholm – 3B (1971–1980)
- Tony La Russa – INF (1963–1973), Hall of Fame manager for the Chicago White Sox, Oakland Athletics, and St. Louis Cardinals, three time World Series champion
- Jack Jenkins – RHP (1962–1969)

==== All-Americans ====
Seven members of South Florida baseball teams have been selected as First Team All-Americans.

- Mike Campbell – 1973, 2B (Div. II)
- Lou Garcia – 1975, 2B
- Scott Hemond – 1984, 1986, C
- Darren Stumberger – 1993, 1B
- Doug Carroll – 1994, OF
- Chris Heintz – 1996, 3B

==== Conference Player of the Year ====
Four Bulls have been named the conference player of the year.

- Mike Kelly – 1987
- Troy Rusk – 1989
- Chris Heintz – 1996
- Ross Gload – 1997

=== Coaches ===
==== Conference Coach of the Year ====
USF head coaches have won 10 conference coach of the year awards.

- Robin Roberts – 1978
- Robin Roberts – 1980
- Robin Roberts – 1981
- Robin Roberts – 1982
- Eddie Cardieri – 1986
- Eddie Cardieri – 1990
- Eddie Cardieri – 1993
- Eddie Cardieri – 1995
- Eddie Cardieri – 1996
- Lelo Prado – 2009

=== USF Athletic Hall of Fame members ===
Two USF baseball players have been inducted into the USF Athletic Hall of Fame:

- Ross Gload (inducted 2010)
- Chris Heintz (inducted 2013)
- Eddie Cardieri (inducted 2024)

=== Retired numbers ===
- 7 – Ross Gload (1B/OF 1995–97)
- 11 – Scott Hemond (C, 1984–86)
- 23 – Chris Heintz (3B, 1993–96)
- 36 – Robin Roberts (Head Coach, 1978–85)

== Media ==
Under the current American Conference TV deal, all home and in-conference away baseball games are shown on one of the various ESPN networks or streamed live on ESPN+. Live radio broadcasts of baseball games are also available worldwide for free on the Bulls Unlimited digital radio station on TuneIn.

== See also ==
- List of NCAA Division I baseball programs
- South Florida Bulls
- South Florida Bulls softball
- University of South Florida
