= Riverside Rubes =

- 1941–1950; (1941, 1947–1950); Riverside, California

Minor league affiliations
- Previous classes: Class C
- Previous leagues: Sunset League (1947–1950); California League (1941)

Major league affiliations
- Previous teams: Pittsburgh Pirates (1947); Cincinnati Reds (1941)

Team data
- Previous names: Riverside Rubes (1948, 1950); Riverside Dons (1947, 1949); Riverside Reds (1941)

The Riverside Rubes/Dons were a minor league baseball team, based in Riverside, California that played in the Sunset League from 1947 to 1950.
