= West Virginia Mountaineers baseball =

- 2026 West Virginia Mountaineers baseball team
- Founded: 1892; 134 years ago
- Overall record: 2,398-1684–17 (.587)
- University: West Virginia University
- Athletic director: Wren Baker
- Head coach: Steve Sabins (2nd season)
- Conference: Big 12 Conference
- Location: Morgantown, West Virginia
- Home stadium: Wagener Field at Kendrick Family Ballpark (capacity: 3,500)
- Nickname: Mountaineers
- Colors: Gold and blue

College World Series appearances
- 2026

NCAA regional champions
- 2024, 2025, 2026

NCAA tournament appearances
- 1955, 1961, 1962, 1963, 1964, 1967, 1982, 1985, 1987, 1994, 1996, 2017, 2019, 2023, 2024, 2025, 2026

Conference tournament champions
- Atlantic 10; 1982, 1985, 1987, 1994 Big East; 1996

Conference regular season champions
- SoCon; 1955, 1961, 1962, 1963, 1964, 1967 Atlantic 10; 1981, 1982, 1984, 1985, 1986, 1987, 1988 Big East; 1996 Big 12; 2023, 2025

Conference division regular season champions
- 1981, 1982, 1984, 1985, 1986, 1987, 1988, 1996, 1997

The West Virginia Mountaineers baseball team is the varsity intercollegiate baseball program of West Virginia University, located in Morgantown, West Virginia, United States. The program has been a member of the NCAA Division I Big 12 Conference since the start of the 2013 season. The program currently plays at Kendrick Family Ballpark. Steve Sabins has served as the team's head coach since before the 2025 season. As of June 2026, the Mountaineers have made 17 NCAA Tournament appearances, with the most recent appearance coming during the 2026 season. The team has also won five conference tournament championships, along with 21 conference titles and nine division titles over its history.

== Program history ==
The West Virginia University baseball program was established in 1892, making it one of the oldest collegiate baseball programs in the country. Over more than a century of play, the Mountaineers have developed a rich tradition marked by competitive success, player development, and strong fan support.

WVU has competed in multiple conferences throughout its history, including the Southern Conference, the Atlantic 10, and the Big East. In 2013, WVU transitioned to the Big 12 Conference, stepping into one of the most competitive baseball environments in the nation. The move helped elevate the profile of the program, attracting higher-level talent and increasing national exposure.

Several Mountaineers have gone on to play professionally, including Major League Baseball standouts like Jedd Gyorko, John Means, and Alek Manoah, who was a first-round draft pick by the Toronto Blue Jays in 2019 and made his MLB debut in 2021.

=== Steve Harrick era (1948-1967) ===
Steve Harrick served as the head coach of the West Virginia University baseball team for 20 seasons, establishing himself as one of the most successful coaches in program history. He compiled an impressive career record of 334–160–1, resulting in a .678 winning percentage. Under his leadership, six of his teams captured Southern Conference titles, and seven earned NCAA district playoff berths.

Harrick's teams enjoyed consistent success throughout the 1960s, a decade that cemented his legacy in WVU baseball history. The Mountaineers posted multiple 20-win seasons during this era and were perennial contenders in the Southern Conference. His 1963 squad achieved a 30–3 record—the first 30-win season in school history—and finished ranked No. 11 in the final Collegiate Baseball poll.

Throughout his tenure, Harrick developed numerous standout players, with 18 of his former athletes going on to be selected by professional organizations. Among them was Paul Popovich, who played in Major League Baseball for the Los Angeles Dodgers, Chicago Cubs, and Pittsburgh Pirates.

Harrick also coached WVU's first baseball All-America selection, outfielder Bill Marovic, in 1964. Marovic batted .404 and led the team in eight offensive categories en route to earning the honor from the American Baseball Coaches Association.

=== Dale Ramsburg era (1968-1994) ===
Dale Ramsburg served as the head coach of the West Virginia University baseball program from 1968 to 1994 and remains one of the most successful coaches in school history. Over his 26-year tenure, Ramsburg compiled a career record of 540–387–9, making him the winningest coach in any sport in the history of West Virginia athletics at the time of his retirement.

Nicknamed “The Rammer,” Ramsburg guided the Mountaineers to four NCAA Tournament appearances (1982, 1985, 1987, and 1994). His 1994 squad set a school record with 40 wins, finishing the season 40–21. He was twice named Atlantic 10 Coach of the Year, earning the honor in both 1988 and 1990, and was selected as Eastern Coach of the Year by the American Baseball Coaches Association in 1994. In 1993, he was appointed to the prestigious seven-member NCAA Baseball Committee.

Ramsburg also had a significant impact on player development during his time at WVU. A total of 27 of his players were selected in the Major League Baseball Draft. In all, 31 of his players went on to play professional baseball, including future Major Leaguers Bucky Guth, Darrell Whitmore, Joe Hudson, and Steve Kline.

=== Greg Van Zant era (1995-2012) ===
Greg Van Zant took over the Mountaineer program in December 1994, a month after the death of longtime mentor Dale Ramsburg

Van Zant was the third baseman for West Virginia University from 1980 to 1983. Prior to becoming head coach, he served as an assistant under longtime head coach Dale Ramsburg.

In just his second season at the helm, Van Zant guided the Mountaineers to a 33–25 record in 1996, capturing the Big East American Division title and winning the Big East Conference Tournament. That success earned WVU an automatic bid to the 1996 NCAA Division I baseball tournament, where they competed in the Atlantic Regional.

Van Zant was named Big East Conference Coach of the Year twice, in 1997 and 2003. Under his leadership, the Mountaineers produced several strong seasons, including a 36–19 campaign in 2003. However, the latter part of his tenure saw a decline in performance, culminating in a 23–32 record in 2012. Following that season, WVU Athletic Director Oliver Luck announced that Van Zant's contract would not be renewed, citing the need for new direction as the program prepared to transition into the Big 12 Conference.

During his tenure he led the WVU baseball program from 1995 to 2012, compiling a career record of 528–451–1 over 18 seasons, which ranks him second all-time in wins at the school.

=== Randy Mazey era (2013-2024) ===
Upon taking the helm, Randy Mazey faced the difficult task of elevating the Mountaineers to compete in one of the strongest baseball conferences in the country. Despite playing home games at multiple locations due to facility limitations, his first team in the 2013 season exceeded expectations, finishing 33–26 overall and 13–11 in Big 12 play during WVU's debut season in the conference.

Big 12 logo in West Virginia's colors

The program saw significant growth under Mazey, who guided West Virginia back to national prominence. Under his leadership, the Mountaineers made several major milestones: in 2017, WVU returned to the NCAA Tournament for the first time since 1996; in 2019, they hosted an NCAA Regional for the first time since 1955, finishing the season 38–22 and ranked No. 21 nationally. In 2023, Mazey led WVU to a share of its first-ever Big 12 regular-season title, tying a school record with 40 wins and securing another NCAA Tournament appearance. In his final season in 2024, he guided the program to its first NCAA Super Regional in school history, going 3–0 in the Tucson Regional and finishing the year 36–24 and ranked No. 13 in the country.

Mazey announced his retirement following the 2024 season. Over 12 seasons at WVU, he compiled a 372–274 overall record, including a 133–133 mark in Big 12 play. His teams went 15–20 in Big 12 Conference Tournament games and 7–8 in NCAA Tournament competition.

=== Steve Sabins era (2025-present) ===
Following the 2024 season and the retirement of longtime head coach Randy Mazey, veteran assistant Steve Sabins was named the 20th head coach in West Virginia baseball history. In his first season at the helm, Sabins guided the Mountaineers to an impressive 44–16 record and a Big 12 regular-season championship. West Virginia swept the Clemson Regional with two wins over Kentucky Wildcats and one over the No. 11 ranked Clemson Tigers. With the regional title, the Mountaineers advanced to the Baton Rouge Super Regional—marking their second consecutive Super Regional appearance—where they were eliminated by the No. 6 national seed, LSU Tigers, in two games.

In 2026, the Mountaineers went 45–15 overall with a 21–9 record in Big 12 play. They finished second in the Big 12 regular season and tournament, and earned the 16th national seed, winning the Morgantown Regional in 7 games. This included defeating the Kentucky Wildcats in 2 wild wins with the score of 11-9 and 6-5. The 11-9 victory included a game-winning 2 run home run and the 6-5 victory included a walk-off single. In the first Super Regional ever in Morgantown, the Mountaineers hosted the Cal Poly Mustangs. West Virginia swept the series, winning 12-2 in game 1 and 17-1 in game 2.

For the first time in program history, West Virginia earned a berth in the College World Series. The team defeated the Troy Trojans and made the Semifinals. They then lost to North Carolina, which was defeated by Oklahoma in the World Series Finals.

=== Head coaches ===
Since the program started in 1892, there have been 20 head coaches in WVU baseball history.

Coach	Years	Overall	%	Conf	%	ConfT	%	NCAA Postseason					
Coach	Years	Overall	%	Conf	%	ConfT	%	Overall	%	Super Reg	%	CWS	%
A. R. Stahlings	1894–1896	14–4	.778	—	—	—	—	—	—	—	—	—	—
J. E. B. Sweeney	1897–1898	8–7	.533	—	—	—	—	—	—	—	—	—	—
Owen Altman	1899–1900	28–9	.757	—	—	—	—	—	—	—	—	—	—
H. Brown	1901	11–7	.611	—	—	—	—	—	—	—	—	—	—
Lee Hutchinson	1902–1905	70–31–2	.689	—	—	—	—	—	—	—	—	—	—
Carl Forkum	1906–1908	61–26	.701	—	—	—	—	—	—	—	—	—	—
Dick Nebinger	1909	17–8	.680	—	—	—	—	—	—	—	—	—	—
J. L. Core	1910	14–11	.560	—	—	—	—	—	—	—	—	—	—
Larry McClure	1911	17–5	.773	—	—	—	—	—	—	—	—	—	—
John Gronninger	1912	13–12	.520	—	—	—	—	—	—	—	—	—	—
Charlie Hickman	1913, 1915–1917	58–23–1	.713	—	—	—	—	—	—	—	—	—	—
B. P. Pattison	1914	12–8	.600	—	—	—	—	—	—	—	—	—	—
Skeeter Shelton	1918–1920	37–17–1	.682	—	—	—	—	—	—	—	—	—	—
Ira Rodgers	1921–1946	204–211–3	.492	—	—	—	—	—	—	—	—	—	—
Charles Hockenberry	1947	9–7	.563	—	—	—	—	—	—	—	—	—	—
Steve Harrick	1948–1967	333–161–1	.674	139-56	.713	1-1	.500	3-12	.200	—	—	—	—
Dale Ramsburg	1968–1994	540–389–9	.580	143-55	.722	22-17	.564	3-8	.273	—	—	—	—
Greg Van Zant	1995–2012	528–451–1	.539	224-232	.491	10-19	.345	2-2	.500	—	—	—	—
Randy Mazey	2013– 2024	372–274	.576	133-133	.500	15-20	.429	7-8	.467	0-2	.000	—	—
Steve Sabins	2025–present	44–16	.733	19-9	.679	1-1	.500	3-2	.600	0-2	.000	—	—
Totals	—	2398–1686–17	.587	662–489	.575	49–50	.495	18–32	.360	0–4	.000	—	—

Most Wins
Rank	Coaches Name	All-Time Wins	Years at WVU
1	Dale Ramsburg	540	1968-1994
2	Greg Van Zant	528	1995-2012
3	Randy Mazey	372	2013-2024
4	Steve Harrick	333	1948-1967
5	Ira Rodgers	201	1921-1942, 1946

Highest Win Percentage
Rank	Coaches Name	All-Time Win Pct.	Years at WVU
1	Steve Harrick	.672	1948-1967
2	Lee Hutchison	.627	1902-1905
3	Dale Ramsburg	.577	1968-1994
4	Randy Mazey	.576	2013-2024
5	Greg Van Zant	.539	1995-2012

Minimum 100 games coached

=== Recruiting ===
Recruiting Rankings
Class	Top 100 Recruits	Conference Rank	National Rank
2011	–	–	NR
2012	–	–	NR
2013	–	8th	69th
2014	–	7th	57th
2015	–	5th	55th
2016	–	6th	46th
2017	–	8th	NR
2018	–	3rd	25th
2019	1	6th	26th
2020	–	7th	37th
2021	1	5th	23rd
2022	–	7th	47th
2023	–	4th	34th
2024	–	5th	39th
2025	–	3rd	16th

- Rankings from Perfect Game

== West Virginia in the NCAA Tournament ==
Year	Record	Pct	Notes
1955	1–2	.333	District 3 Regional
1961	1–2	.333	District 3 Regional
1962	0–2	.000	District 3 Regional
1963	1–2	.333	District 3 Regional
1964	0–2	.000	District 3 Regional
1967	0–2	.000	District 3 Regional
1982	2–2	.500	East Regional
1985	0–2	.000	South I Regional
1987	0–2	.000	South I Regional
1994	1–2	.333	Atlantic Regional
1996	2–2	.500	Atlantic Regional
2017	2–2	.500	Winston-Salem Regional
2019	1–2	.333	Hosted Morgantown Regional
2023	1–2	.333	Lexington Regional
2024	3–2	.600	Chapel Hill Super Regional, Tucson Regional Champions
2025	3–2	.600	Baton Rouge Super Regional, Clemson Regional Champions
2026	8–3	.727	College World Series, Morgantown Super Regional Champions, Morgantown Regional Champions
TOTALS	28–35	.444	

== All-time season results ==
National champions	College World Series berth	NCAA Tournament berth	Conference Tournament Champions	Conference/Division Regular Season Champions

Season	Head coach	Conference	Season results									Tournament results		Final poll (Note: Collegiate Baseball began team rankings in 1959. Baseball America began during the 1981 season.)			
Season	Head coach	Conference	Overall				Conference					Conference	Postseason	BA	D1	CP	CB
Season	Head coach	Conference	Wins	Losses	Ties	%	Wins	Losses	Ties	%	Finish	Conference	Postseason	BA	D1	CP	CB
West Virginia Mountaineers
1892	No Coach	Independent	3	3	0	.500	—	—	—	—	—	—	—	—	—	—	—
1893	No Coach	Independent	1	0	0	1.000	—	—	—	—	—	—	—	—	—	—	—
1894	A. R. Stahlings	Independent	5	0	0	1.000	—	—	—	—	—	—	—	—	—	—	—
1895	A. R. Stahlings	Independent	4	1	0	.800	—	—	—	—	—	—	—	—	—	—	—
1896	A. R. Stahlings	Independent	5	3	0	.625	—	—	—	—	—	—	—	—	—	—	—
1897	J. E. B. Sweeney	Independent	3	2	0	.600	—	—	—	—	—	—	—	—	—	—	—
1898	J. E. B. Sweeney	Independent	5	5	0	.500	—	—	—	—	—	—	—	—	—	—	
1899	Owen Altman	Independent	16	6	0	.727	—	—	—	—	—	—	—	—	—	—	
1900	Owen Altman	Independent	12	3	0	.800	-	—	—	—	—	—	—	—	—	—	
1901	H. Brown	Independent	11	7	0	.611	—	—	—	—	—	—	—	—	—	—	
1902	Lee Hutchinson	Independent	22	7	0	.759	—	—	—	—	—	—	—	—	—	—	
1903	Lee Hutchinson	Independent	14	9	0	.609	—	—	—	—	—	—	—	—	—	—	
1904	Lee Hutchinson	Independent	16	6	1	.717	—	—	—	—	—	—	—	—	—	—	
1905	Lee Hutchinson	Independent	19	9	1	.672	—	—	—	—	—	—	—	—	—	—	
1906	Carl Forkum	Independent	20	10	0	.667	—	—	—	—	—	—	—	—	—	—	
1907	Carl Forkum	Independent	17	11	0	.607	—	—	—	—	—	—	—	—	—	—	
1908	Carl Forkum	Independent	24	5	0	.828	—	—	—	—	—	—	—	—	—	—	
1909	Dick Nebinger	Independent	17	8	0	.680	—	—	—	—	—	—	—	—	—	—	
1910	J. L. Core	Independent	14	11	0	.560	—	—	—	—	—	—	—	—	—	—	
1911	Larry McClure	Independent	17	5	0	.773	—	—	—	—	—	—	—	—	—	—	
1912	John Gronninger	Independent	13	12	0	.520	—	—	—	—	—	—	—	—	—	—	
1913	Charlie Hickman	Independent	12	4	0	.750	—	—	—	—	—	—	—	—	—	—	
1914	B. P. Pattison	Independent	12	8	0	.600	—	—	—	—	—	—	—	—	—	—	
1915	Charlie Hickman	Independent	19	7	1	.722	—	—	—	—	—	—	—	—	—	—	
1916	Charlie Hickman	Independent	17	6	0	.739	—	—	—	—	—	—	—	—	—	—	
1917	Charlie Hickman	Independent	10	6	0	.625	—	—	—	—	—	—	—	—	—	—	
1918	Skeeter Shelton	Independent	13	3	0	.813	—	—	—	—	—	—	—	—	—	—	
1919	Skeeter Shelton	Independent	14	3	1	.806	—	—	—	—	—	—	—	—	—	—	
1920	Skeeter Shelton	Independent	10	11	0	.476	—	—	—	—	—	—	—	—	—	—	
1921	Ira Rodgers	Independent	20	7	0	.741	—	—	—	—	—	—	—	—	—	—	
1922	Ira Rodgers	Independent	16	11	0	.593	—	—	—	—	—	—	—	—	—	—	
1923	Ira Rodgers	Independent	13	11	0	.542	—	—	—	—	—	—	—	—	—	—	
1924	Ira Rodgers	Independent	8	13	0	.381	—	—	—	—	—	—	—	—	—	—	
1925	Ira Rodgers	Independent	13	11	0	.542	—	—	—	—	—	—	—	—	—	—	
1926	Ira Rodgers	Independent	10	10	0	.500	—	—	—	—	—	—	—	—	—	—	
1927	Ira Rodgers	Independent	6	12	1	.342	—	—	—	—	—	—	—	—	—	—	
1928	Ira Rodgers	Independent	13	4	0	.765	—	—	—	—	—	—	—	—	—	—	
1929	Ira Rodgers	Independent	8	9	0	.471	—	—	—	—	—	—	—	—	—	—	
1930	Ira Rodgers	Independent	6	13	1	.325	—	—	—	—	—	—	—	—	—	—	
1931	Ira Rodgers	Independent	6	9	1	.406	—	—	—	—	—	—	—	—	—	—	
1932	Ira Rodgers	Independent	8	8	0	.500	—	—	—	—	—	—	—	—	—	—	
1933	Ira Rodgers	Independent	7	9	0	.438	—	—	—	—	—	—	—	—	—	—	
1934	Ira Rodgers	Independent	4	13	0	.235	—	—	—	—	—	—	—	—	—	—	
1935	Ira Rodgers	Independent	9	9	0	.500	—	—	—	—	—	—	—	—	—	—	
1936	Ira Rodgers	Independent	10	9	0	.526	—	—	—	—	—	—	—	—	—	—	
1937	Ira Rodgers	Independent	12	10	0	.545	—	—	—	—	—	—	—	—	—	—	
1938	Ira Rodgers	Independent	5	10	0	.333	—	—	—	—	—	—	—	—	—	—	
1939	Ira Rodgers	Independent	8	7	0	.533	—	—	—	—	—	—	—	—	—	—	
1940	Ira Rodgers	Independent	9	5	0	.643	—	—	—	—	—	—	—	—	—	—	
1941	Ira Rodgers	Independent	5	10	0	.333	—	—	—	—	—	—	—	—	—	—	
1942	Ira Rodgers	Independent	2	9	0	.182	—	—	—	—	—	—	—	—	—	—	
1943	No season due to World War II																
1944	No season due to World War II																
1945	No season due to World War II																
1946	Ira Rodgers	Independent	6	2	0	.750	—	—	—	—	—	—	—	—	—	—	
1947	Charles Hockenberry	Independent	9	7	0	.563	—	—	—	—	—	—	—	—	—	—	
1948	Steve Harrick	Independent	16	6	0	.727	—	—	—	—	—	—	—	—	—	—	
1949	Steve Harrick	Independent	13	8	0	.619	—	—	—	—	—	—	—	—	—	—	
1950	Steve Harrick	Independent	8	14	0	.364	—	—	—	—	—	—	—	—	—	—	
1951	Steve Harrick	Southern Conference	17	6	0	.739	10	4	0	.714	2nd (North)	3rd	—	—	—	—	
1952	Steve Harrick	Southern Conference	12	9	0	.571	7	3	0	.700	t–2nd (North)	—	—	—	—	—	
1953	Steve Harrick	Southern Conference	6	7	0	.462	2	5	0	.286	7th (North)	—	—	—	—	—	
1954	Steve Harrick	Southern Conference	13	7	0	.650	5	4	0	.556	6th	—	—	—	—	—	
1955	Steve Harrick	Southern Conference	20	6	0	.769	7	2	0	.778	1st		NCAA District 3		—	—	—
1956	Steve Harrick	Southern Conference	16	9	0	.640	6	3	0	.667	2nd	—	—	—	—	—	
1957	Steve Harrick	Southern Conference	12	8	0	.600	4	5	0	.444	5th	—	—	—	—	—	
1958	Steve Harrick	Southern Conference	12	11	0	.522	5	3	0	.625	5th	—	—	—	—	—	
1959	Steve Harrick	Southern Conference	16	9	0	.640	8	5	0	.615	5th	—	—	—	—	—	
1960	Steve Harrick	Southern Conference	17	9	0	.654	6	4	0	.600	t–3rd	—	—	—	—	—	
1961	Steve Harrick	Southern Conference	17	10	0	.630	8	2	0	.800	1st	-	NCAA District 3	—	-	—	24
1962	Steve Harrick	Southern Conference	17	9	0	.654	9	2	0	.818	1st	-	NCAA District 3	—	-	—	20
1963	Steve Harrick	Southern Conference	30	3	0	.909	13	1	0	.929	1st	-	NCAA District 3	—	-	—	11
1964	Steve Harrick	Southern Conference	24	5	0	.828	14	2	0	.875	1st	-	NCAA District 3	—	-	—	15
1965	Steve Harrick	Southern Conference	19	9	0	.679	10	4	0	.714	2nd	—	—	—	—	-	
1966	Steve Harrick	Southern Conference	26	7	1	.779	12	4	0	.750	2nd	—	—	—	—	—	—
1967	Steve Harrick	Southern Conference	22	9	0	.710	13	3	0	.813	1st	-	NCAA District 3	—	—	—	20
1968	Dale Ramsburg	Southern Conference	9	8	0	.529	4	4	0	.500	5th	—	—	—	—	—	—
1969	Dale Ramsburg	Independent	12	6	1	.658	—	—	—	—	—	—	—	—	—	—	—
1970	Dale Ramsburg	Independent	12	5	0	.706	—	—	—	—	—	—	—	—	—	—	—
1971	Dale Ramsburg	Independent	21	6	0	.778	—	—	—	—	—	—	—	—	—	—	
1972	Dale Ramsburg	Independent	10	10	0	.500	—	—	—	—	—	—	—	—	—	—	
1973	Dale Ramsburg	Independent	8	12	1	.405	—	—	—	—	—	—	—	—	—	—	
1974	Dale Ramsburg	Independent	12	13	0	.480	—	—	—	—	—	—	—	—	—	—	
1975	Dale Ramsburg	Independent	10	18	0	.357	—	—	—	—	—	—	—	—	—	—	
1976	Dale Ramsburg	Independent	21	12	0	.636	—	—	—	—	—	—	—	—	—	—	
1977	Dale Ramsburg	Independent	10	18	0	.357	—	—	—	—	—	—	—	—	—	—	
1978	Dale Ramsburg	Atlantic 10	16	9	0	.640	—	—	—	—	—	—	—	—	—	—	—
1979	Dale Ramsburg	Atlantic 10	9	13	0	.409	—	–	–	—	—	First round	–	—	—	—	
1980	Dale Ramsburg	Atlantic 10	12	14	2	.464	—	–	–	—	—	Second round	–	—	—	—	
1981	Dale Ramsburg	Atlantic 10	17	18	0	.486	6	2	0	.750	1st (West)	2nd	—	—	—	—	—
1982	Dale Ramsburg	Atlantic 10	24	23	0	.511	7	2	0	.778	1st (West)	1st	East Regional	—	—	—	16
1983	Dale Ramsburg	Atlantic 10	22	10	0	.688	6	4	0	.600	2nd (West)	–	—	—	—	—	
1984	Dale Ramsburg	Atlantic 10	22	11	1	.662	9	3	0	.750	t–1st (West)	First round	—	—	—	—	
1985	Dale Ramsburg	Atlantic 10	27	16	0	.628	9	3	0	.750	1st (West)	1st	South Regional	—	—	—	—
1986	Dale Ramsburg	Atlantic 10	24	14	1	.628	9	2	0	.818	1st (West)	2nd	—	—	—	—	
1987	Dale Ramsburg	Atlantic 10	32	15	0	.681	9	3	0	.750	1st (West)	1st	South Regional	—	—	—	—
1988	Dale Ramsburg	Atlantic 10	33	17	1	.657	12	4	0	.750	1st (West)	Semifinals	—	—	—	—	
1989	Dale Ramsburg	Atlantic 10	26	13	1	.663	9	5	0	.643	3rd (West)	—	—	—	—	—	
1990	Dale Ramsburg	Atlantic 10	33	20	0	.623	12	4	0	.750	2nd (West)	2nd	—	—	—	—	
1991	Dale Ramsburg	Atlantic 10	20	20	1	.500	9	7	0	.563	3rd (West)	—	—	—	—	—	
1992	Dale Ramsburg	Atlantic 10	24	23	0	.511	12	4	0	.750	2nd (West)	2nd	—	—	—	—	
1993	Dale Ramsburg	Atlantic 10	29	25	0	.537	13	8	0	.619	2nd	2nd	—	—	—	—	
1994	Dale Ramsburg	Atlantic 10	40	21	0	.656	17	4	0	.810	2nd	1st	Atlantic Regional	—	—	—	—
1995	Greg Van Zant	Atlantic 10	18	32	0	.360	11	13	0	.458	6th	—	—	—	—	—	
1996	Greg Van Zant	Big East	33	25	0	.569	15	10	0	.600	1st (American)	1st	Atlantic Regional	—	—	—	—
1997	Greg Van Zant	Big East	36	19	0	.655	17	7	0	.708	1st (American)	Third round	—	—	—	—	
1998	Greg Van Zant	Big East	37	17	1	.682	13	9	0	.591	5th	Third round	—	—	—	—	
1999	Greg Van Zant	Big East	29	28	0	.509	12	13	0	.480	6th	Second round	—	—	—	—	
2000	Greg Van Zant	Big East	25	28	0	.472	10	12	0	.455	7th	—	—	—	—	—	
2001	Greg Van Zant	Big East	27	26	0	.509	12	14	0	.462	7th	—	—	—	—	—	
2002	Greg Van Zant	Big East	24	26	0	.480	9	16	0	.360	10th	—	—	—	—	—	
2003	Greg Van Zant	Big East	36	19	0	.655	18	6	0	.750	2nd	Semifinals	—	—	—	—	
2004	Greg Van Zant	Big East	23	29	0	.442	10	16	0	.385	8th	—	—	—	—	—	
2005	Greg Van Zant	Big East	25	30	0	.455	10	15	0	.400	7th	—	—	—	—	—	
2006	Greg Van Zant	Big East	36	22	0	.621	14	13	0	.519	5th	Second round	—	—	—	—	
2007	Greg Van Zant	Big East	29	22	0	.569	10	16	0	.385	9th	—	—	—	—	—	
2008	Greg Van Zant	Big East	35	21	0	.625	13	14	0	.481	7th	Second round	—	—	—	—	
2009	Greg Van Zant	Big East	37	18	0	.673	17	10	0	.630	3rd	Second round	—	—	—	—	
2010	Greg Van Zant	Big East	27	30	0	.474	10	17	0	.370	8th	First round	—	—	—	—	
2011	Greg Van Zant	Big East	28	27	0	.509	14	13	0	.519	4th	First round	—	—	—	—	
2012	Greg Van Zant	Big East	23	32	0	.418	9	18	0	.333	11th	—	—	—	—	—	
2013	Randy Mazey	Big 12	33	26	0	.559	13	11	0	.542	t–3rd	2nd	—	—	—	—	-
2014	Randy Mazey	Big 12	28	26	0	.519	9	14	0	.391	6th	Second round	—	—	—	—	-
2015	Randy Mazey	Big 12	27	27	0	.500	9	13	0	.409	7th	First round	—	—	—	—	-
2016	Randy Mazey	Big 12	36	22	0	.621	12	11	0	.522	4th	2nd		—	—	-	—
2017	Randy Mazey	Big 12	36	26	0	.581	12	12	0	.500	t–4th	Semifinals	Winston-Salem Regional	—	—	—	—
2018	Randy Mazey	Big 12	29	27	0	.518	9	15	0	.375	7th	Semifinals	—	—	—	-	—
2019	Randy Mazey	Big 12	38	22	0	.633	13	11	0	.542	4th	2nd	Morgantown Regional	20	21	19	21
2020	Randy Mazey	Big 12	11	5	0	.688	0	0	0	—	—	Season cancelled due to COVID-19	—	—	-	—	—
2021	Randy Mazey	Big 12	25	27	0	.481	8	16	0	.333	t–8th	Second round	—	—	-	—	—
2022	Randy Mazey	Big 12	33	22	0	.600	14	10	0	.583	t–5th	First round	—	—	-	—	—
2023	Randy Mazey	Big 12	40	20	0	.667	15	9	0	.625	1st	First round	Lexington Regional	—	—	—	—
2024	Randy Mazey	Big 12	36	24	0	.600	19	11	0	.633	4th	First round	Chapel Hill Super Regional	13	13	17	13
2025	Steve Sabins	Big 12	44	16	0	.733	19	9	0	.679	1st	Quarterfinals	Baton Rouge Super Regional	13	14	17	—
2026	Steve Sabins	Big 12	47	17	0	.734	21	9	0	.700	2nd	2nd	College World Series	4	4	4	—
Total			2,445	1,703	17	.589											

=== Conference Regular Season Championships ===
Year	Conference	Head Coach	Conference Record
1955	SoCon	Steve Harrick	7–2
1961	SoCon	Steve Harrick	8–2
1962	SoCon	Steve Harrick	9–2
1963	SoCon	Steve Harrick	7–2
1964	SoCon	Steve Harrick	8–2
1967	SoCon	Steve Harrick	9–2
1981	Eastern 8	Dale Ramsburg	6–2
1982	Eastern 8	Dale Ramsburg	7–2
1984	A-10	Dale Ramsburg	9–3
1985	A-10	Dale Ramsburg	9–3
1986	A-10	Dale Ramsburg	9–2
1987	A-10	Dale Ramsburg	9–3
1988	A-10	Dale Ramsburg	12–4
1996	Big East	Greg Van Zant	15–10
2023	Big 12	Randy Mazey	15–9
2025	Big 12	Steve Sabins	19–9

=== National Rankings ===
West Virginia University has finished the season ranked in a Division I final baseball poll 10 times.

Year	Record	Final Ranking
1961	17-10	Collegiate Baseball #24
1962	17-9	Collegiate Baseball #20
1963	30-3	Collegiate Baseball #11
1964	24-5	Collegiate Baseball #15
1967	22-9	Collegiate Baseball #20
1982	24-23	Collegiate Baseball #16
2019	38-22	Baseball America #20; Coaches’ #19; Collegiate Baseball #27; D1Baseball #21; NCBWA #19
2024	36-24	Baseball America #13; D1Baseball #13; Coaches’ #17; NCBWA #13; Collegiate Baseball #13; Perfect Game #13
2025	44-16	Baseball America #13; D1Baseball #14; Coaches’ #17; NCBWA #12; Perfect Game #14
2026	47-17	Baseball America #4; D1Baseball #4; Coaches’ #4; NCBWA #4; Perfect Game #4
Source: Major College Baseball Polls; Collegiate Baseball; Baseball America; USA Today Coaches’ Poll; NCBWA; D1Baseball; Perfect Game

== Wagener Field at Kendrick Family Ballpark (2015–present) ==
Kendrick Family Ballpark, originally named Monongalia County Ballpark, has served as the home of West Virginia Mountaineers baseball since its opening in 2015. As of the 2025 season, the Mountaineers have compiled a 162–81 record at the ballpark. The stadium has been the site of numerous key Big 12 victories, non-conference matchups, and memorable moments, including hosting an NCAA Regional in 2019. These events have played a significant role in the team's overall success and postseason appearances during this era. With a fixed seating capacity of 3,500. The stadium's inaugural game took place on April 10, 2015, when WVU defeated Butler 6–5 in 13 innings. Notable home victories include a 6–5 win over the #23 Oklahoma Sooners in April 2015 marking the program's first Big 12 home win at the new park and hosting capacity crowds during the 2019 Morgantown Regional, including a postseason game against Fordham attended by over 4,300 fans.

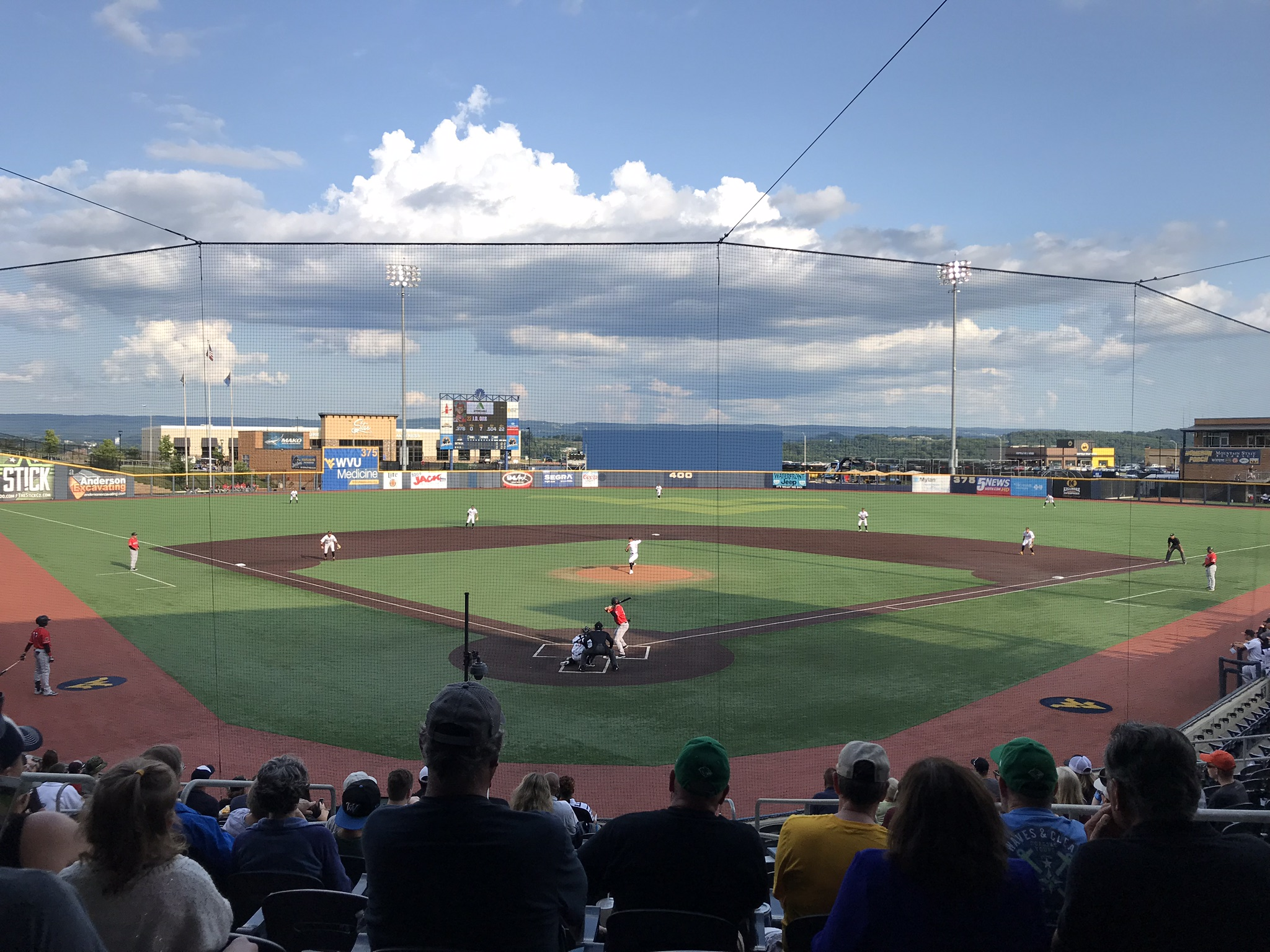

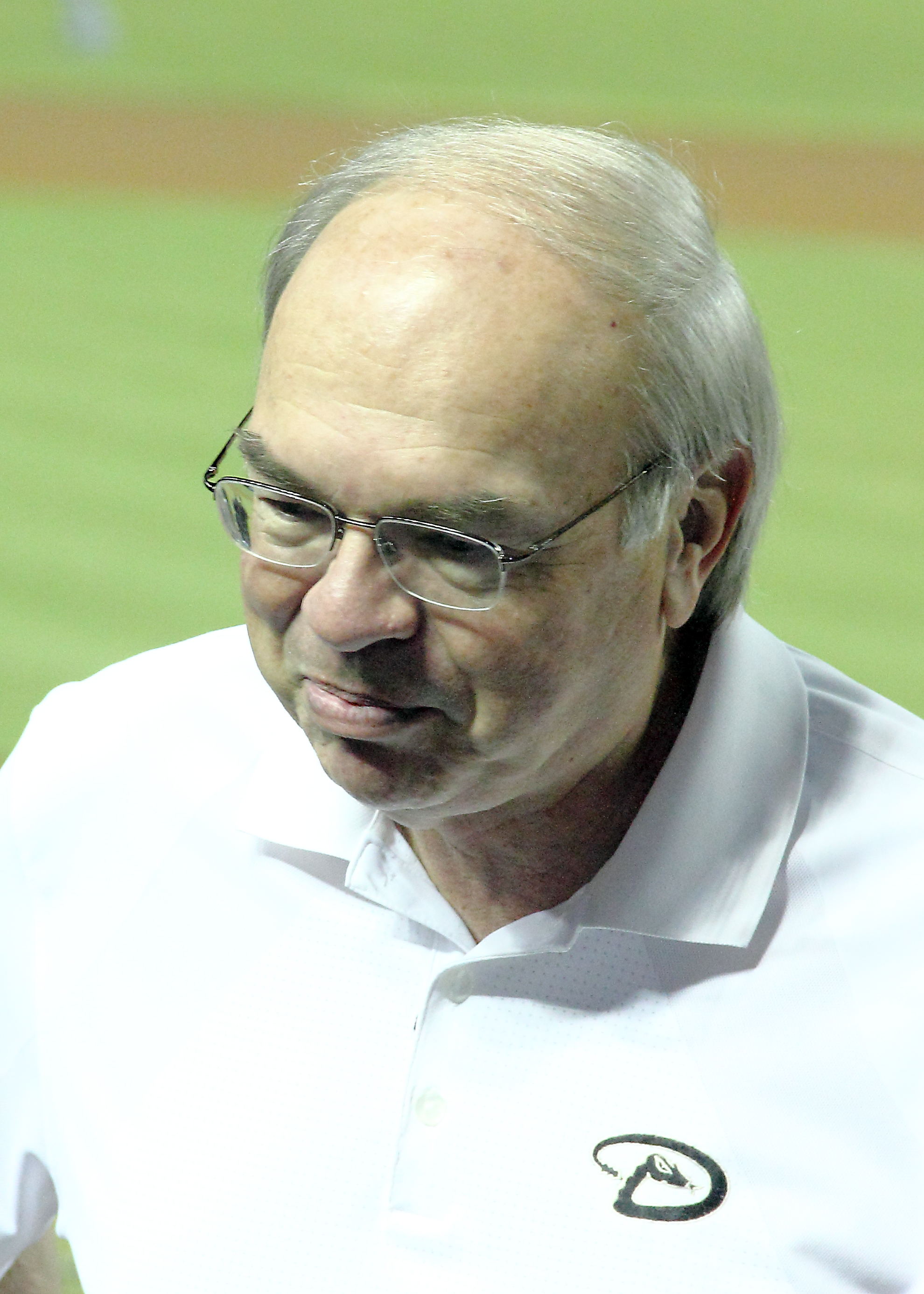
WVU alumnus and Arizona Diamondbacks owner Ken Kendrick, namesake of Kendrick Family Ballpark.

In 2024, West Virginia University officially renamed its baseball stadium Kendrick Family Ballpark at the Monongalia County Baseball Complex in honor of alumnus and Arizona Diamondbacks owner Ken Kendrick, following a major gift from the Kendrick family. The donation supports facility upgrades, most notably the construction of a new 8,200-square-foot indoor pitching and hitting facility, scheduled for completion in February 2025. The facility will feature two regulation-size pitching lanes, two full-size batting cages, a soft toss area, and state-of-the-art Trackman technology for performance analytics.

=== Yearly Home Attendance ===
Year	Home Games	Home Record	Total Attendance	Natl. Rank by Total	Conf. Rank by Total	Average Attendance	Natl. Rank by Average	Conf. Rank by Average
2005	28	16-12	4,520	*	*	161	*	*
2006	32	23-9	7,436	*	*	232	*	*
2007	26	19-7	7,340	*	*	282	*	*
2008	32	26-6	10,092	*	*	315	*	*
2009	28	23-5	9,797	*	*	350	*	*
2010	29	15-14	8,999	*	*	310	*	*
2011	27	19-8	8,212	*	*	304	*	*
2012	26	15-11	8,475	*	*	326	*	*
2013	21	16-5	27,907	*	*	1,328	50th	*
2014	15	11-4	16,470	95th	9th	1,098	60th	9th
2015	22	8-10	33,158	60th	7th	1,507	44th	6th
2016	30	20-10	40,390	49th	6th	1,346	49th	6th
2017	22	14-8	40,613	50th	6th	1,846	37th	5th
2018	23	15-8	35,101	56th	7th	1,526	47th	6th
2019	25	18-7	41,253	48th	6th	1,794	37th	6th
2020	3	3-0	2,174	142nd	9th	725	77th	7th
2021	27	15-12	15,845	49th	6th	587	49th	6th
2022	22	17-6	50,058	43rd	6th	2,275	31st	5th
2023	24	18-6	59,894	41st	6th	2,496	32nd	5th
2024	23	17-6	67,084	38th	6th	2,917	27th	5th
2025	24	17-7	77,877	35th	6th	3,245	27th	5th

*Records as of May 31, 2025
*2020 Season was canceled on March 13 due to the COVID-19 outbreak
*West Virginia competed in the Big East Conference from 1996 to 2012, during which time the conference sponsored baseball and featured 12 baseball-playing members.
* West Virginia has been a member of the Big 12 Conference since 2013. The conference featured nine baseball-playing schools through the 2023 season, expanded to 13 members in 2024, and grew to 14 members beginning in 2025.

== Awards and honors ==
West Virginia has produced numerous nationally recognized players and coaches. The program boasts multiple First Team All-Americans, including JJ Wetherholt, Alek Manoah, Jedd Gyorko, and Chris Enochs. Several players have earned Conference Player, Pitcher, and Freshman of the Year honors in the Atlantic 10, Big East, and Big 12 conferences. The Mountaineers have also been guided by Conference Coaches of the Year, including Dale Ramsburg, Greg Van Zant, and Randy Mazey.

=== WVU Baseball All-Americans ===
==== First Team All-Americans ====
Player	Position	Year	Selectors
Bill Marovic	CF	1964	ABCA
Chris Enochs	RHP	1997	ABCA, CB
Jedd Gyorko	SS	2010	NCBWA
Alek Manoah	RHP	2019	ABCA, BA, Perfect Game, D1Baseball, College Baseball Foundation, NCBWA
JJ Wetherholt†	2B	2023	BA, NCBWA, ABCA, Perfect Game, Collegiate Baseball, D1Baseball, College Baseball Foundation
Source: ABCA: American Baseball Coaches Association BA: Baseball America CB: Collegiate Baseball NCBWA: National Collegiate Baseball Writers Association LS: Louisville Slugger † Denotes consensus All-American

==== Second Team All-Americans ====
Player	Position	Year	Selectors
Ed Tekavec	3B	1961	ABCA
Tom Shafer	P	1961	Amateur Baseball Federation
Mark Landers	1B	1994	ABCA
Chris Enochs	RHP	1997	BA, NCBWA, Sporting News
Jedd Gyorko	2B	2008	NCBWA
Jedd Gyorko	SS	2009	Louisville Slugger
Jedd Gyorko	SS	2010	Louisville Slugger, ABCA, BA
Harrison Musgrave	LHP	2013	Louisville Slugger
Alek Manoah	RHP	2019	ABCA, College Baseball Foundation
Source: ABCA: American Baseball Coaches Association BA: Baseball America CB: Collegiate Baseball NCBWA: National Collegiate Baseball Writers Association LS: Louisville Slugger

==== Third Team All-Americans ====
Player	Position	Year	Selectors
Joe Hatalla	2B	1962	ABCA
Mark Landers	1B	1994	CB, NCBWA
Joe McNamee	LF	1998	ABCA
Justin Jenkins	LF	2007	CB, Louisville Slugger, NCBWA
Tyler Kuhn	SS	2008	NCBWA, ABCA
Vince Belnome	2B	2009	College Baseball Insider
Jedd Gyorko	SS	2009	NCBWA
Braden Zarbnisky	RHP/OF	2017	NCBWA
Kyle Gray	2B	2018	ABCA
Trey Braithwaite	RHP	2022	NCBWA
Derek Clark	LHP	2024	NCBWA, D1Baseball
JJ Wetherholt	SS	2024	Perfect Game
Griffin Kirn	LHP	2025	NCBWA
Source: ABCA: American Baseball Coaches Association BA: Baseball America CB: Collegiate Baseball NCBWA: National Collegiate Baseball Writers Association LS: Louisville Slugger

=== Other baseball awards ===
Award	Year	Position	Name
Freshman All-Americans	2006	CF	Adam White
Freshman All-Americans	2008	2B	Jedd Gyorko
Freshman All-Americans	2015	INF	Kyle Davis
Freshman All-Americans	2015	RHP	BJ Myers
Freshman All-Americans	2016	C	Ivan Gonzalez
Freshman All-Americans	2016	OF	Darius Hill
Freshman All-Americans	2020	LHP	Jake Carr
Freshman All-Americans	2020	C	Matt McCormick
Freshman All-Americans	2021	LHP	Ben Hampton
Freshman All-Americans	2023	RHP	David Hagaman
A-10 Player of the Year	1994	1B	Mark Landers
A-10 Pitcher of the Year	1993		Steve Kline
Big East Player of the Year	2003		Jarod Rine
Big 12 Player of the Year	2023	2B	JJ Wetherholt

== School records ==
=== Individual School Records ===
==== Career Leaders in Hits ====
Rank	Player	Hits	Years
1	Tyler Kuhn	324	2005–08
2	Darius Hill	304	2016–19
3	Jedd Gyorko	281	2008–10
4	Justin Jenkins	253	2005–07
5	Tim McCabe	251	2000–03
6	Josh Williamson	244	1994–97
7	Grant Buckner	232	2008–11
8	Lee Fritz	230	2002–05
8	Ivan Gonzalez	230	2016–19
10	Ryan McBroom	225	2011–14

==== Career Leaders in Batting Average ====
Min.100 at-bats & 2 seasons

Rank	Player	AVG.	Years
1	Jedd Gyorko	.404	2008–10
2	Darrell Whitmore	.392	1989–90
3	Jeff Battaglia	.389	1985–86
4	Vince Belnome	.388	2007–09
5	Lance Williams	.387	1998–99
6	Jamie Hammond	.383	1997–98
7	JJ Wetherholt	.381	2022–24
8	Steve Rolen	.380	1986–89
9	Lee Fritz	.378	2002–05
10	Joe McNamee	.374	1995–98

==== Career Leaders in Home Runs ====
Rank	Player	Home Runs	Years
1	Grant Hussey	44	2022–25
2	Tim McCabe	35	2000–03
2	Jedd Gyorko	35	2008–10
4	Stan Posluszny	33	2003–06
4	Justin Jenkins	33	2005–07
6	Mark Landers	32	1991–94
7	Joe McNamee	30	1995–98
8	Ryan McBroom	29	2011–14
8	Jackson Cramer	29	2014–17
8	JJ Wetherholt	29	2022–24

==== Career Leaders in RBI ====
Rank	Player	RBI	Years
1	Tyler Kuhn	188	2005–08
2	Jedd Gyorko	178	2008–10
3	Stan Posluszny	174	2003–06
3	Vince Belnome	174	2007–09
5	Mark Landers	167	1991–94
6	Darius Hill	163	2016–19
7	Ryan McBroom	162	2011–14
8	Austin Markel	156	2006–09
9	Grant Hussey	153	2022–25
10	Tim McCabe	152	2000–03

==== Career Leaders in Stolen Bases ====
Rank	Player	Stolen Bases	Years
1	Bill Marovic	74	1963–65
2	Tevin Tucker	67	2019–23
3	Austin Davis	64	2019–22
4	Victor Scott II	62	2020–22
5	Brandon White	61	2017–19
6	Bobby Boyd	58	2000–03
7	JJ Wetherholt	57	2000–03
8	Braden Zarbnisky	55	2016–20
9	Brady Wilson	45	2010–13
10	Braden Berry	44	2021–23

==== Career Leaders in Wins ====
Rank	Player	Wins	Years
1	Wes Shaw	28	1987–90
2	Fulton Woods	26	1920–23
2	Ryan Williams	26	1991–94
4	Frank Barron	25	1913–15
4	John Radosevich	25	1963–65
6	Jim Heise	24	1953–56
6	Zac Cline	24	2002–04
8	Shane Rhodes	22	1998–01
9	Jack Latterner	21	1916–19
9	Jerry Meadows	21	1965–67
9	Ken Smith	21	1986–87
9	Chris Enochs	21	1995–97

==== Career Leaders in Strikeouts ====
Rank	Player	Strikeouts	Years
1	John Radosevich	338	1963–65
2	Shane Rhodes	284	1998–01
3	Jim Heise	277	1953–56
4	Paul Chuma	275	1958–60
5	Fulton Woods	263	1920–23
6	Frank Barron	257	1913–15
7	Alek Manoah	249	2017–19
8	Matt Yurish	247	2005–08
9	BJ Myers	245	2015–18
10	Wes Shaw	243	1987–90

==== Career Leaders in Innings Pitched ====
Rank	Player	IP	Years
1	BJ Myers	305.1	1963–65
2	Shane Rhodes	304.2	1998–01
3	Jim Heise	283.1	1953–56
4	Zac Cline	282.2	2002–04
5	Wes Shaw	276.4	1987–90
6	Corey Walter	266.2	2011–14
7	Ryan Williams	265.0	2017–19
8	Harrison Musgrave	258.1	2011, 13–14
9	Matt Yurish	247.2	2005–08
10	Ross Vance	246.1	2014–16

=== Single-season team records ===
Games

- Most Games played: 62 (2017)
- Most Victories: 44 (2025)
- Most Losses: 32 (1995, 2012)
- Most Conference Victories: 19 (2024, 2025)
- Best Winning Percentage: .909 (1963)
- Longest Winning Streak: 18 (1964)

Offense

- Most At-Bats: 2,136 (2017)
- Most Runs Scored: 525 (2009)
- Most Hits: 704 (2006)
- Most Doubles: 161 (2009)
- Most Triples: 30 (2008)
- Most Home Runs: 91 (2024)
- Most Total Bases: 1,080 (2009)
- Most Runs Batted In: 491 (2009)
- Most Walks: 323 (2023)
- Most Strikeouts: 534 (2024)
- Most Stolen Bases: 156 (2022)
- Highest Batting Average: .393 (2006)
- Highest Slugging Percentage: .564 (2009)

Pitching

- Most Innings Pitched: 551.0 (2017)
- Most Saves: 15 (2019, 2025)
- Lowest Earned Run Average: 1.46 (1964)
- Most Complete Games: 24 (2003)
- Most Shutouts: 7 (1987)
- Most Strikeouts: 595 (2019)

== All-time series records ==
=== Current Big 12 members ===
Opponent	Meeting		Series			Home			Away			Neutral			Postseason			Conf. Tournament			NCAA Tournament		
	First	Latest	W	L	T	W	L	T	W	L	T	W	L	T	W	L	T	W	L	T	W	L	T
Arizona	2023	2026	4	4	0	1	2	0	3	1	0	0	1	0	0	1	0	0	1	0			
Arizona State	2026	2026	3	1	0	0	0	0	2	1	0	1	0	0	1	0	0	1	0	0			
Baylor	2013	2026	22	15	0	11	3	0	10	11	0	1	1	0	1	1	0	1	1	0			
BYU	2024	2026	7	2	0	5	1	0	2	1	0	0	0	0	0	0	0	0	0	0			
Cincinnati	1908	2026	24	21	0	15	6	0	8	14	0	1	1	0	1	1	0	1	1	0			
Houston	2025	2026	5	1	0	2	1	0	3	0	0	0	0	0	0	0	0	0	0	0			
Kansas	2013	2026	25	18	0	11	10	0	11	7	0	3	2	0	3	2	0	3	2	0			
Kansas State	2013	2025	21	17	0	11	4	0	10	11	0	0	2	0	0	2	0	0	2	0			
Oklahoma State	1996	2025	17	26	0	5	10	0	10	7	0	2	6	0	2	6	0	2	6	0			
TCU	2013	2026	15	27	0	9	12	0	5	10	0	1	5	0	1	5	0	1	5	0			
Texas Tech	2013	2026	22	24	0	12	9	0	5	13	0	5	2	0	5	2	0	5	2	0			
UCF	1993	2026	7	3	0	4	2	0	3	0	0	0	0	1	0	0	0	0	0	0			
Utah	2025	2025	3	0	0	3	0	0	0	0	0	0	0	0	0	0	0	0	0	0			

* Records as of June 2, 2026.

=== Former Big 12 and Big East members ===
Opponent	Meeting		Series			Home			Away			Neutral			Postseason			Conf. Tournament			NCAA Tournament		
	First	Latest	W	L	T	W	L	T	W	L	T	W	L	T	W	L	T	W	L	T	W	L	T
Boston College	1996	2005	10	14	0	7	6	0	3	8	0	0	0	0	–	–	–	–	–	–			
Connecticut	1996	2012	23	25	0	11	15	0	11	9	0	1	1	0	0	1	0	0	1	0			
Georgetown	1996	2012	31	33	0	18	4	0	13	29	0	0	0	0	–	–	–	–	–	–			
Louisville	2001	2014	6	15	0	5	7	0	1	6	0	0	2	0	0	1	0	0	1	0			
Notre Dame	1910	2011	22	40	0	8	13	0	9	19	0	5	8	0	5	8	0	5	8	0			
Oklahoma	2012	2024	17	21	0	9	9	0	6	9	0	2	3	0	2	2	0	2	2	0			
Pittsburgh	1895	2025	118	94	0	68	39	0	44	53	0	6	2	0	1	0	0	1	0	0			
Rutgers	1979	2012	22	42	1	11	14	0	4	19	1	7	9	0	8	9	0	8	9	0			
Seton Hall	1995	2012	26	18	0	15	3	0	9	12	0	2	3	0	2	1	0	2	1	0			
South Florida	2006	2012	8	13	0	5	4	0	3	6	0	0	3	0	0	3	0	0	3	0			
St. John's	1996	2012	19	31	0	8	12	0	8	15	0	3	3	0	2	3	0	2	3	0			
Texas	2013	2023	16	16	0	8	4	0	7	11	0	1	1	0	1	1	0	1	1	0			
Villanova	1996	2012	28	16	0	17	5	0	11	11	0	–	–	–	–	–	–	–	–	–			
Virginia Tech	1905	2019	36	52	1	19	14	0	13	27	1	4	11	0	1	0	0	1	0	0			

Records as of May 25, 2025.

=== in-state opponents ===
Opponent	Meeting		Series			Home			Away			Neutral			Postseason			Conf. Tournament			NCAA Tournament		
	First	Latest	W	L	T	W	L	T	W	L	T	W	L	T	W	L	T	W	L	T	W	L	T
Charleston	1906	2022	18	4	0	12	2	0	6	2	0	0	0	0	–	–	–	–	–	–			
Fairmont State	1892	1989	60	11	1	54	5	1	6	6	0	0	0	0	–	–	–	–	–	–			
Marshall	1910	2025	58	27	0	37	8	0	16	18	0	5	1	0	–	–	–	–	–	–			

== Mountaineers in the MLB ==
As of the conclusion of the 2025 MLB draft, a total of 117 West Virginia University players have been selected in the Major League Baseball Draft.

Mountaineers in the Major League Baseball Draft (1965–1994)
Year	Player	Round	Team
1965	John Radosevich	5	Dodgers
1965	Ron Renner	30	Cubs
1966	Jerry Meadows#	23	Cardinals
1966	Doug Stanley	25	Pirates
1966	Vaughn Kovach	21	Orioles
1967	Jerry Meadows#	4	Astros
1967	Jerry Meadows	5	Orioles
1967	Chuck Boggs	11	Dodgers
1968	Denny Taylor	24	Cubs
1969	Bucky Guth	20	Braves
1970	Jim Mavroleon	28	Reds
1971	John Hale	19	Reds
1971	Rick Oliver	1 (Jan Sec)	Brewers
1971	Rick Wagener	2	Mets
1972	Kim West	13	Pirates
1973	Joe Honce	1 (Jan Dft)	Twins
1984	Joe Filandino	12	Padres
1985	Rich Schlieper	20	Blue Jays
1985	Bob Bernardo	25	Mariners
1985	Bob Tucker	27	Dodgers
1986	Jeff Battaglia	15	Indians
1986	Bobby Watts	24	Blue Jays
1987	Ken Smith	37	Cardinals
1988	Benny Shreve	34	Cubs
1989	Steve Rolen	25	Giants
1990	Darrell Whitmore	2	Indians
1990	Mike Mason	23	Cardinals
1991	Mike Moore	21	Indians
1991	Dan Servello	27	Royals
1991	Mike Sube	40	Dodgers
1992	David DeMoss	14	Cubs
1992	Joe Hudson	27	Red Sox
1993	Steve Kline	8	Indians
1993	Dan Berry	29	Rockies
1994	Mark Landers	28	Blue Jays

Mountaineers in the Major League Baseball Draft (1995–2013)
Year	Player	Round	Team
1996	Mike Riley	16	Giants
1996	Scott Seabol	88	Yankees
1997	Chris Enochs	1	Athletics
1997	Steve Beller	19	Brewers
1998	Brad Elwood	19	Yankees
1998	Garrett Zyskowski	22	Astros
1998	Jamie Hammond	23	Expos
1998	David Kloes	41	Yankees
1999	Jeremy Cummings	21	Cardinals
2001	Shane Rhodes	11	Red Sox
2001	David Maust	17	Cubs
2001	Vance McCracken	18	Dodgers
2001	Josh Cisneros	23	Phillies
2001	Matt Blethen	24	Indians
2001	Billy Biggs*	36	Cardinals
2002	Joe Van Gorder	14	Cardinals
2002	Dustin Nippert	15	Diamondbacks
2002	Billy Biggs	19	Diamondbacks
2003	Jarod Rine	9	Orioles
2003	Jason DiAngelo	7	Rockies
2004	Grant Psomas	15	Mets
2004	Zac Cline	15	Phillies
2004	Patrick Copen	7	Dodgers
2004	Stan Posluszny	21	Angels
2006	David Carpenter	12	Cubs
2006	Stan Posluszny	34	Mariners
2007	Adam White	9	Indians
2007	Kenny Durst	15	Rockies
2007	Levi Maxwell	18	White Sox
2007	Tyler Kuhn*	33	Indians
2008	Tyler Kuhn	15	White Sox
2008	Josh Whitlock	26	Cubs
2009	Tobias Streich	5	Twins
2009	Vince Belnome	28	Padres
2010	Jedd Gyorko	2	Padres
2011	Grant Buckner	26	White Sox
2013	Ryan Tuntland	29	Giants
2013	Harrison Musgrave*	33	Phillies
2013	Sean Carley*	34	Padres
2013	Ryan McBroom*	36	Royals

Mountaineers in the Major League Baseball Draft (2014–2024)
Year	Player	Round	Team
2014	Bobby Boyd	8	Astros
2014	Harrison Musgrave	8	Rockies
2014	John Means	11	Orioles
2014	Sean Carley	14	Yankees
2014	Ryan McBroom	15	Blue Jays
2014	Corey Walter	28	Athletics
2015	Blake Smith*	24	Nationals
2015	Taylor Munden	27	Marlins
2016	Chad Donato	11	Astros
2016	Blake Smith	21	Angels
2017	Kyle Davis	15	Astros
2017	Jackson Cramer	35	Nationals
2018	Michael Grove	2	Dodgers
2018	Kyle Gray	14	Yankees
2018	Jimmy Galusky	20	White Sox
2018	BJ Myers	35	Rays
2019	Alek Manoah	1	Blue Jays
2019	Ivan Gonzalez	8	White Sox
2019	Nick Synder	11	Diamondbacks
2019	Kade Strowd	12	Orioles
2019	Brandon White	17	Angels
2019	Darius Hill	20	Cubs
2019	Chase Illig	29	Yankees
2019	Sam Kessler	34	Tigers
2021	Jackson Wolf	4	Padres
2021	Ryan Bergert	6	Padres
2021	Madison Jeffery	15	Dodgers
2021	Adam Tulloch*	17	Dodgers
2022	Jacob Watters	4	Athletics
2022	Victor Scott II	5	Cardinals
2022	Trey Braithwaite	16	Reds
2023	Carlson Reed	4	Pirates
2023	Braden Barry	8	Blue Jays
2024	JJ Wetherholt	1	Cardinals
2024	David Hagaman	4	Rangers
2024	Aidan Major	5	Guardians
2024	Derek Clark	7	Angels
2024	Tyler Switalski	13	Giants

Mountaineers in the Major League Baseball Draft (2025–present)
Year	Player	Round	Team
2025	Logan Sauve	7	Athletics
2025	Kyle West	13	Yankees
2025	Robby Porco	13	Dodgers
2025	Griffin Kirn	13	Athletics
2025	Skylar King	15	Red Sox

Player	Pos.	Teams	MLB Seasons	Years at WVU
Charlie Hickman	1B/2B/RF	Boston Beaneaters, New York Giants, Boston Americans, Cleveland Naps, Detroit Tigers, Washington Senators, Chicago White Sox	1897–1908	1897
Ed Kenna	RHP	Philadelphia Athletics	1902	1901
Gene Curtis	LF	Pittsburgh Pirates	1903	1902
Lewis Smith	LF	Pittsburgh Pirates, Chicago Cubs, Washington Senators	1904, 1906, 1911	1900–03
William Washer	RHP	Philadelphia Phillies	1905	1902
Larry McClure	LF	New York Yankees	1910	1910
Frank Barron	LHP	Washington Senators	1914	1913–15
Kemper Shelton	CF	New York Yankees	1915	1907–09
Fulton Woods	RHP	Boston Red Sox	1924	1920–23
Babe Barna	LF	Philadelphia Athletics, New York Giants, Boston Red Sox	1937–38, 1941–44	1935–37
George Freese	3B	Detroit Tigers, Pittsburgh Pirates, Chicago Cubs	1953, 1955, 1961	1947
Jim Heise	RHP	Washington Senators	1957	1953–56
Paul Popovich	INF	Chicago Cubs, Los Angeles Dodgers, Pittsburgh Pirates	1964–75	1960
Bucky Guth	SS	Minnesota Twins	1972	1967–69
Darrell Whitmore	RF	Florida Marlins	1993–95	1989–90
Steve Kline	LHP	Cleveland Indians, Montreal Expos, St. Louis Cardinals, Baltimore Orioles, San Francisco Giants	1997–2007	1993
Joe Hudson	RHP	Boston Red Sox, Milwaukee Brewers	1995–98	1990–92
Scott Seabol	INF	New York Yankees, St. Louis Cardinals	2001, 2005	1996
Dustin Nippert	RHP	Arizona Diamondbacks, Texas Rangers	2005–10	2002
David Carpenter	RHP	Houston Astros, Toronto Blue Jays, Atlanta Braves, New York Yankees, Washington Nationals, Texas Rangers	2011–15, 2019	2004–06
Jedd Gyorko	INF	San Diego Padres, St. Louis Cardinals, Los Angeles Dodgers, Milwaukee Brewers	2013–20	2008–10
Vince Belnome	DH	Tampa Bay Rays	2014	2007–09
Ryan McBroom	1B/OF	Kansas City Royals	2019–21	2011–14
John Means	LHP	Baltimore Orioles, Cleveland Guardians	2018–present	2013–14
Harrison Musgrave	LHP	Colorado Rockies	2018–19	2011, 2013–14
Alek Manoah	RHP	Toronto Blue Jays	2021–present	2017–19
Michael Grove	RHP	Los Angeles Dodgers	2022–present	2016–18
Jackson Wolf	LHP	San Diego Padres	2023	2018–21
Victor Scott II	OF	St. Louis Cardinals	2024–present	2020–22
Ryan Bergert	RHP	San Diego Padres, Kansas City Royals	2025–present	2019–2021
Kade Strowd	RHP	Baltimore Orioles	2025–present	2017–19
JJ Wetherholt	INF	St. Louis Cardinals	2026–present	2022–24

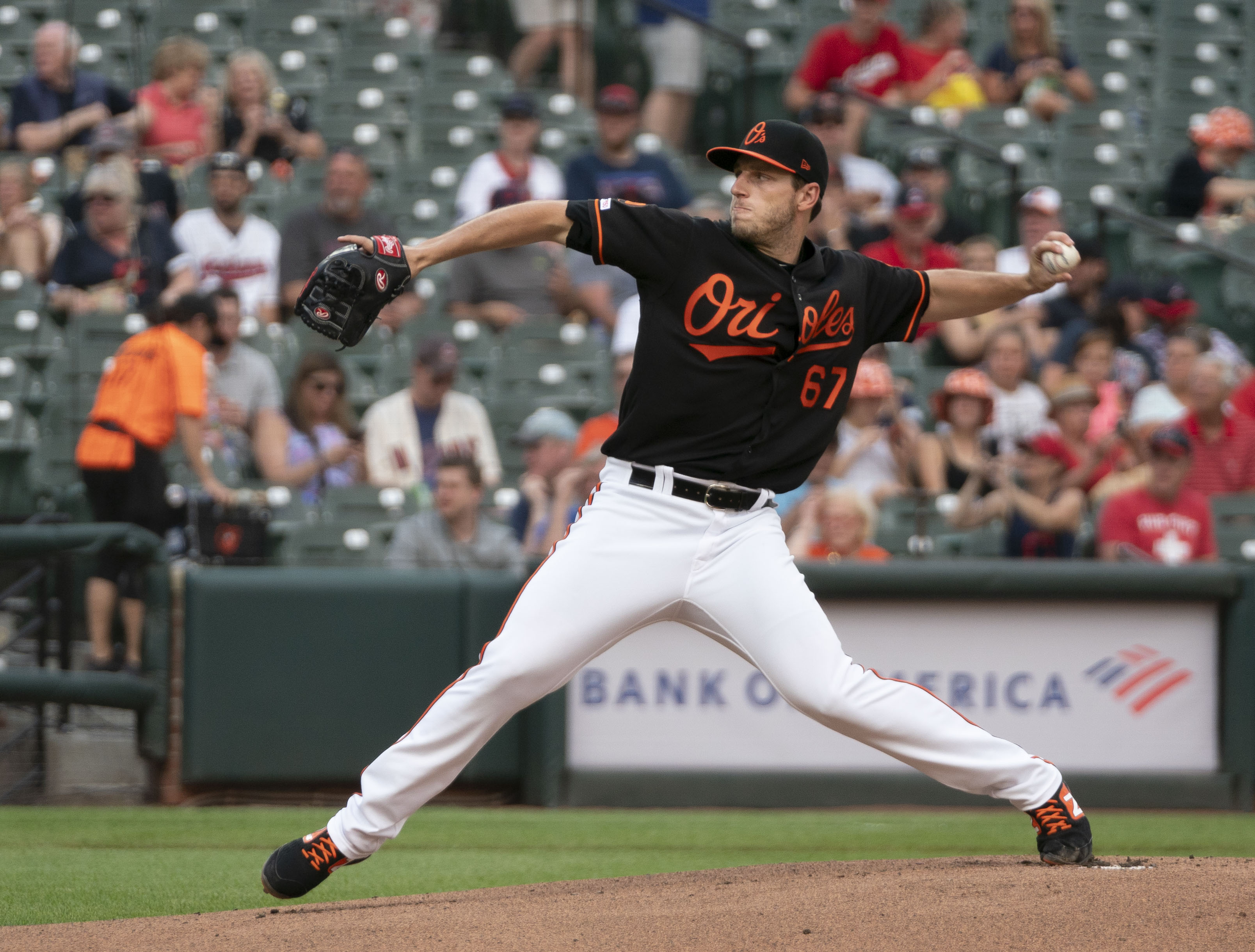
John Means pitching for the Orioles in 2019

=== MLB Award Winners ===
==== All-Star selections ====
- John Means – LHP
  MLB All-Star (2019)
- Alek Manoah – RHP
  MLB All-Star(2022)

==== No-Hitters ====
- John Means – May 5, 2021 –
  vs Seattle Mariners

== See also ==
- List of NCAA Division I baseball programs
