= Rearick =

Rearick is a surname. Notable people with the surname include:

- Chris Rearick (born 1987), American baseball player
- Dave Rearick (born 1932), American rock climber and mathematician

== See also ==
- Janet Cox-Rearick (1930–2018), American art historian
