= Dale Ramsburg =

American college baseball coach (1941–1994)

Biographical details
- Born: October 21, 1941; Frederick, Maryland, U.S.
- Died: November 3, 1994 (aged 53); Morgantown, West Virginia, U.S.
- Education: West Virginia University

Playing career
- 1963–1964: West Virginia
- 1964: Wisconsin Rapids Twins
- Position: Shortstop

Coaching career (HC unless noted)
- 1967: West Virginia (Assistant)
- 1968–1994: West Virginia

Head coaching record
- Overall: 540–387–9 (.582)
- Tournaments: NCAA: 3–8 (.273); A-10: 22–14 (.611); Eastern 8: 3–6 (.333)

Accomplishments and honors

Championships
- As head coach: Eastern 8 Tournament (1982); 2x Eastern 8 West Division (1981,1982); 3x A-10 Tournament (1985, 1987, 1994); 5x A-10 West Division (1984, 1985, 1986, 1987, 1988); As assistant coach: Southern (1967)

Awards
- 2x Atlantic 10 Conference Coach of the Year (1988, 1990); ABCA East Region Coach of the Year (1994)

Irvin Dale Ramsburg (October 21, 1941 – November 3, 1994) was an American college baseball coach. He served as the head baseball coach at West Virginia University, compiling a record of 540–387–9. He was posthumously inducted into the Mountaineers Hall of Fame in 1995.

Ramsburg also played for the Mountaineers, starting at shortstop in 1963 and 1964. He played for the minor league Wisconsin Rapids Twins in 1964. He came the Mountaineers head coach at age 26, coaching until his death at age 53 in November 1994.

== Head coaching record ==
Below is a table of Ramsburg’s yearly records as an NCAA baseball coach.

Record table
Season	Team	Overall	Conference	Standing	Postseason
West Virginia Mountaineers (Southern Conference) (1968)
1968	West Virginia	9–8	4–4	5th	
West Virginia Mountaineers (Independent) (1969–1977)
1969	West Virginia	12–6–1			
1970	West Virginia	12–5			
1971	West Virginia	21–6			
1972	West Virginia	10–10			
1973	West Virginia	8–12–1			
1974	West Virginia	12–13			
1975	West Virginia	10–18			
1976	West Virginia	21–12			
1977	West Virginia	10–18			
West Virginia Mountaineers (Atlantic 10 Conference) (1978–1994)
1978	West Virginia	16–9			
1979	West Virginia	9–13			
1980	West Virginia	12–14–2			
1981	West Virginia	17–18	6–2	1st (West)	
1982	West Virginia	24–23	7–2	1st (West)	NCAA East regional
1983	West Virginia	22–10	6–4	2nd (West)	
1984	West Virginia	22–11–1	9–3	1st (West)	
1985	West Virginia	27–16	9–3	1st (West)	NCAA South I regional
1986	West Virginia	24–14–1	9–2	1st (West)	
1987	West Virginia	32–15	9–3	1st (West)	NCAA South I regional
1988	West Virginia	33–19–1	12–4	1st (West)	
1989	West Virginia	28–13–1	9–5	3rd (West)	
1990	West Virginia	33–20	12–4	2nd (West)	
1991	West Virginia	20–20–1	9–7	3rd (West)	
1992	West Virginia	27–20	12–4	2nd (West)	
1993	West Virginia	29–25	13–8	2nd	
1994	West Virginia	40–21	17–4	2nd	NCAA Atlantic I regional
West Virginia:		540–387–9			
Total:		540–387–9			
National champion Postseason invitational champion Conference regular season champion Conference regular season and conference tournament champion Division regular season champion Division regular season and conference tournament champion Conference tournament champion
