= JJ Wetherholt =

American baseball player (born 2002)

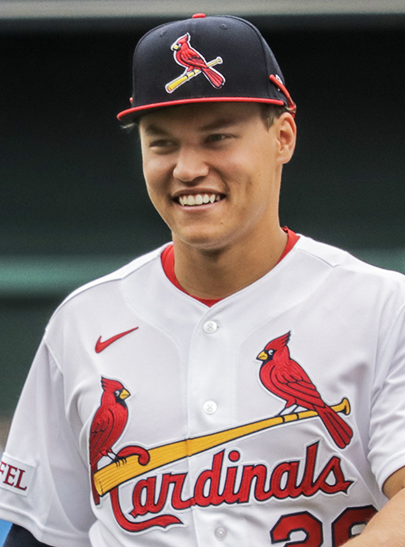
- Wetherholt with the Cardinals in 2026

St. Louis Cardinals – No. 26
- Second baseman
- Born: September 10, 2002 (age 24); Baltimore, Maryland, U.S.
- Bats: Left Throws: Right

MLB debut
- March 26, 2026, for the St. Louis Cardinals

MLB statistics (through 2026 season)
- Batting average: .242
- Home runs: 17
- Runs batted in: 51
- Stats at Baseball Reference

Teams
- St. Louis Cardinals (2026–present)

Jonathan David "JJ" Wetherholt (born September 10, 2002) is an American professional baseball second baseman for the St. Louis Cardinals of Major League Baseball (MLB). He was selected by the Cardinals in the first round of the 2024 MLB draft and made his MLB debut in 2026.

== Amateur career ==
Wetherholt attended Mars Area High School in Mars, Pennsylvania. He went undrafted in the 2021 Major League Baseball draft and enrolled at West Virginia University to play college baseball for the Mountaineers.

As a freshman at West Virginia in 2022, Wetherholt played in 54 games (making 53 starts) and hit .308 with five home runs, 39 RBI, 17 doubles, and 15 stolen bases. That summer, he briefly played in the Northwoods League for the Madison Mallards with whom he batted .368 over 12 games.

As a sophomore in 2023, Wetherholt garnered national attention. He played in 55 games and batted .449 with 16 home runs, 60 RBI, and 36 stolen bases. He was named one of five finalists for the Dick Howser Trophy. He was also named the Big 12 Conference Baseball Player of the Year. Following the 2023 season, he played collegiate summer baseball for the Chatham Anglers of the Cape Cod Baseball League. He also played for the USA Baseball Collegiate National Team. Wetherholt injured his hamstring four games into the 2024 season, and missed over a month. Over 36 games, he batted .331 with eight home runs and 30 RBI.

Legend
GP	Games played	AB	At Bats	R	Runs
H	Hits	HR	Home runs	RBI	Runs batted in
BB	Base on balls (walks)	SB	Stolen bases	AVG.	Batting average
OBP.	On-base %	SLG.	Slugging %	OPS	On-base plus slugging

College statistics
Year	School	AB	GP	R	H	2B	HR	SLG.	RBI	AVG.	SO	OBP.	SB
2022	West Virginia	208	54	53	64	17	5	.471	39	.308	43	.411	15
2023	West Virginia	225	55	67	101	24	16	.787	60	.449	22	.517	36
2024	West Virginia	124	36	30	41	8	8	.589	30	.331	17	.472	6
Total		557	145	148	206	49	29	.625	129	.370	82	.467	57

== Professional career ==
=== Minor leagues ===
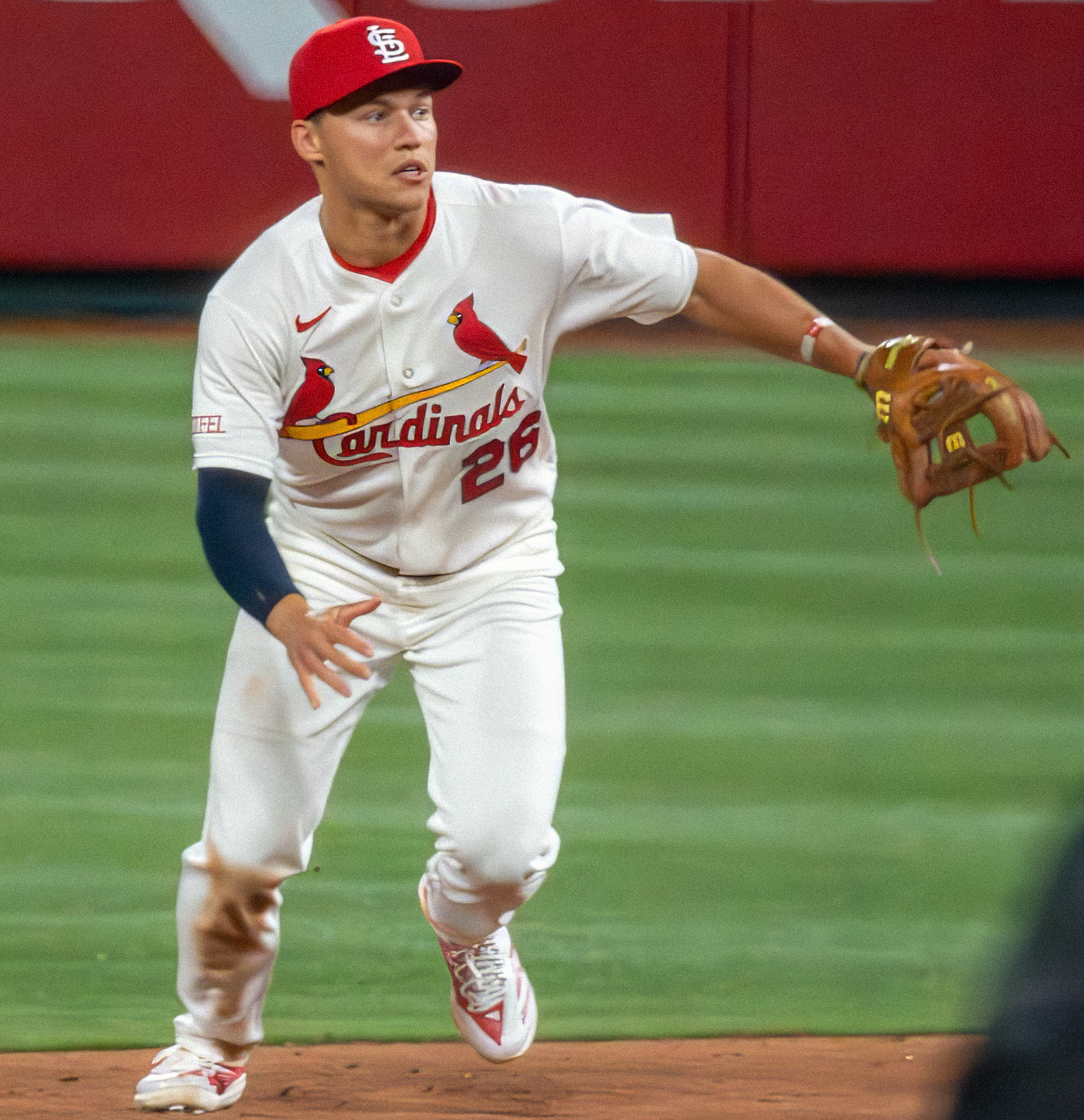
Wetherholt with the Cardinals in 2026

Wetherholt was selected by the St. Louis Cardinals in the first round with the seventh overall pick of the 2024 Major League Baseball draft. On July 20, 2024, Wetherholt signed with the Cardinals on a $6.8 million contract.

Three days after signing his professional contract with the Cardinals, Wetherholt was assigned to the rookie-league Florida Complex League Cardinals roster on July 23. He was quickly promoted to Single-A Palm Beach Cardinals of the Florida State League on July 30, with whom he played the remainder of the season. During the final week of the 2024 regular season, Wetherholt was named the Florida State League player of the week from September 2–9. Wetherholt was also a key contributor in the subsequent playoff rounds, highlighted by a two-run triple in the seventh inning of the decisive championship game to help Palm Beach win their first Florida State league title since 2017. Over 29 games for the season, Wetherholt hit .295 with two home runs and 20 RBI.

Wetherholt was assigned to the Double-A Springfield Cardinals of the Texas League to open the 2025 season. He was selected to represent the Cardinals at the 2025 All-Star Futures Game at Truist Park. On July 8, 2025, Wetherholt was promoted to the Triple-A Memphis Redbirds of the International League. Over 109 games between the two teams, Wetherholt hit .306 with 17 home runs, 59 RBI, 28 doubles, and 23 stolen bases. He was awarded both the 2025 Texas League Most Valuable Player Award and the International League Top MLB Prospect Award. The Cardinals also named Wetherholt their Minor League Player of the Year.

=== Major leagues ===
JJ Wetherholt's first Major League hit and home run, March 26, 2026.

On March 23, 2026, the Cardinals announced that Wetherholt had made the team's Opening Day roster. Two days later, St. Louis formally selected his contract. Wetherholt made his MLB debut on March 26, during the Cardinals' season home opener versus the Tampa Bay Rays, where he started at second base and batted in the leadoff spot. He recorded his first MLB hit, a solo home run off of Drew Rasmussen in third inning. Two days later, on March 28, Wetherholt delivered his first career walk-off hit, a two-run single off of Rays pitcher Griffin Jax. On July 10, Wetherholt and the Cardinals agreed to an eight–year, $112.5 million extension that runs through the 2034 season. On August 30, he was placed on the injured list for the first time in his professional career with right wrist tendinitis. He was activated and returned to the Cardinals on September 16. Wetherholt ended his rookie season with a .242/.339/.365 slash line with 17 home runs, 51 RBI, and 14 stolen bases across 139 games. He was named a finalist for the Gold Glove Award for National League second basemen. Wetherholt was also named a finalist for National League Rookie of the Year and finished third in voting behind winner Sal Stewart and Carson Benge.

== Personal life ==
Wetherholt’s grandmother is from South Korea, and he stated that he would represent Team South Korea in the 2026 World Baseball Classic. Wetherholt later told reporters that he was not permitted to play for the team as he is "not Korean enough. You need a direct parent to be a citizen […], I think it would really mean a lot to her. But unfortunately, (I) won't be able to do it."

In his free time, Wetherholt is a largemouth bass fisherman.
