= Darius Hill (baseball) =

American baseball player (born 1997)

Free agent
- Outfielder
- Born: August 17, 1997 (age 28); Dallas, Texas, U.S.
- Bats: Left Throws: Left

Darius Anthony Hill (born August 17, 1997) is an American professional baseball outfielder who is a free agent. He played college baseball for the West Virginia Mountaineers.

== Amateur career ==
Hill grew up in Dallas, Texas, and attended the Jesuit College Preparatory School of Dallas.

Hill played college baseball at West Virginia for four seasons. He was named second team All-Big 12 Conference and a freshman All-American after leading the team with 75 hits, 20 doubles, four triples, and 112 total bases. Hill batted .307 with four home runs and 46 RBIs as a sophomore. After the 2017 season, he played collegiate summer baseball for the Brewster Whitecaps of the Cape Cod Baseball League. Hill was again named second team All-Big 12 as a junior after batting .329 and finishing second in the conference with 79 hits. He hit .315 with 6 home runs, 25 doubles, and 41 RBI and was named second team all-conference for a third time in his senior season.

== Professional career ==
Hill was selected in the 20th round (612th overall) of the 2019 Major League Baseball draft by the Chicago Cubs. After signing with the team he was assigned to the Rookie-level Arizona League Cubs, where he played eight games before being promoted to the Eugene Emeralds of the Low-A Northwest League. Hill was later promoted to the Single-A South Bend Cubs. He did not play in a game in 2020 due to the cancellation of the minor league season because of the COVID-19 pandemic.

Hill was assigned to the Single-A Myrtle Beach Pelicans to start the 2021 season. He had 12 hits in seven games for the Pelicans and was promoted to the Double-A Tennessee Smokies. Hill returned to Tennessee to start the 2022 season and batted .308 with 57 hits in 44 games before being promoted to the Triple-A Iowa Cubs.

Hill spent the entirety of the 2023 campaign with Triple-A Iowa, playing in 90 games and batting .272/.343/.377 with two home runs, 44 RBI, and three stolen bases. He made 98 appearances for Iowa during the 2024 season, slashing .267/.323/.355 with two home runs, 41 RBI, and three stolen bases.

In 2025, Hill made 55 appearances split between Iowa and the Double-A Knoxville Smokies, hitting a combined .199/.282/.312 with three home runs, 15 RBI, and one stolen bases. Hill was released by the Cubs organization on August 12, 2025.
