= Bucky Guth =

American baseball player (born 1947)

- Shortstop
- Born: August 18, 1947 (age 78); Baltimore, Maryland, U.S.
- Batted: Right Threw: Right

MLB debut
- September 12, 1972, for the Minnesota Twins

Last MLB appearance
- October 3, 1972, for the Minnesota Twins

MLB statistics
- Games played: 3
- At bats: 3
- Runs scored: 1
- Stats at Baseball Reference

Teams
- Minnesota Twins (1972)

Charles Henry Guth (born August 18, 1947) is an American former Major League Baseball shortstop who played three games in 1972 with the Minnesota Twins, going hitless in three at bats. He batted and threw right-handed.

He was drafted by the Atlanta Braves in the 20th round of the 1969 Major League Baseball draft. He attended West Virginia University, where he played college baseball for the Mountaineers from 1967–1969.
