= Larry McClure (baseball) =

American baseball player (1884-1949)

- Born: October 8, 1884; Wayne, West Virginia, U.S.
- Died: September 1, 1949 (aged 64); Huntington, West Virginia, U.S.
- Batted: Right Threw: Right

MLB debut
- July 26, 1910, for the New York Highlanders

Last MLB appearance
- July 26, 1910, for the New York Highlanders

MLB statistics
- Games played: 1
- At bats: 1
- Hits: 0
- Stats at Baseball Reference

Teams
- New York Highlanders (1910)

Lawrence Ledwith McClure (October 8, 1884 – September 1, 1949) was an American Major League Baseball player. He played in one game on July 26, 1910, for the New York Highlanders. McClure was a relatively small person, standing at 5 feet, 6 inches and weighing 130 pounds.

McClure attended West Virginia University, where he played college baseball for the Mountaineers in 1910. McClure also attended Amherst College.
