= Charles Hockenberry =

American athlete and coach (1918–2007)

Biographical details
- Born: June 21, 1918; Josephine, Pennsylvania, U.S.
- Died: March 15, 2007 (aged 88); Morgantown, West Virginia, U.S.

Playing career

Football
- 1938–1939: West Virginia

Basketball
- 1938–1939: West Virginia

Baseball
- 1939–1941: West Virginia
- 1941–1942: Allentown Wings
- 1946: Rochester Red Wings
- Positions: Halfback (football); Catcher (baseball)

Coaching career (HC unless noted)

Football
- 1947–1948: West Virginia Tech

Baseball
- 1947: West Virginia

Head coaching record
- Overall: 10–8 (football); 9–7 (baseball)

Charles E. Hockenberry (June 21, 1918 – March 15, 2007) was an American football, basketball, baseball player and coach. He served as the head football coach at the West Virginia University Institute of Technology from 1947 to 1948, compiling a record of 10–8. Hockenberry was also the head baseball coach at West Virginia University in 1947, tallying a mark of 9–7.

== Playing career ==
Hockenberry earned his Bachelor of Science degree from West Virginia University in 1941. While there, he lettered in baseball, football, and basketball. After graduation, he played minor league baseball before enlisting in the United States Army Air Forces.

== Coaching career ==
Hockenberry returned to West Virginia in 1952 and worked in the athletic department until 1978. He was inducted into the WVU Sports Hall of Fame in 2005.
