= Steve Harrick =

American football, baseball, and wrestling coach

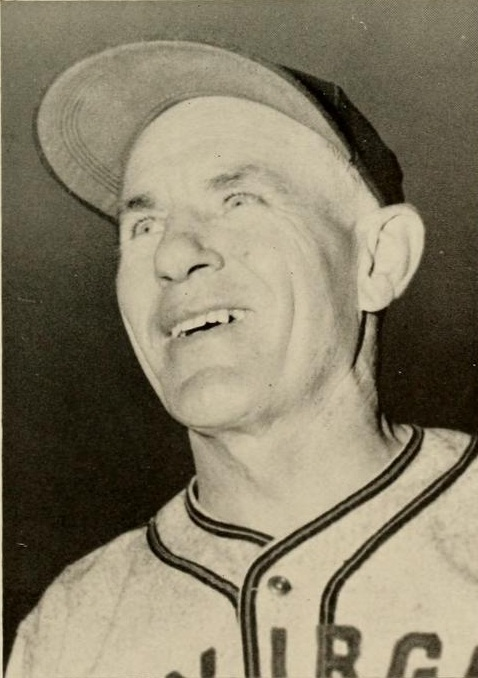
- Harrick from The Monticola, 1948

Biographical details
- Born: December 26, 1896; Fordham, Pennsylvania, U.S.
- Died: December 7, 1988 (aged 91); Morgantown, West Virginia, U.S.
- Education: West Virginia University

Coaching career (HC unless noted)

Football
- 1935–1946: West Virginia Tech

Baseball
- 1948–1967: West Virginia

Administrative career (AD unless noted)
- 1932-1947: West Virginia Tech

Head coaching record
- Overall: Football: 34–39–1 (.466); Baseball: 334–160 (.676); Wrestling:155–99–4 (.609)

Accomplishments and honors

Championships
- Baseball: 6x Southern (1955, 1961, 1962, 1963, 1964, 1967)

Stephen Harrick (December 26, 1896 – December 7, 1988) was an American football, baseball, and wrestling coach. He served as the head football coach at the West Virginia University Institute of Technology (formerly known as the New River State College until 1941) from 1935 to 1946, compiling a record of 34–39–1. Harrick was also the head baseball coach at West Virginia University, tallying a mark of 334–160.

Harrick died on December 7, 1988 in Morgantown, West Virginia, following a brief illness.
