= Frank Barron (baseball) =

American baseball player (1890-1964)

- Pitcher
- Born: August 6, 1890; St. Marys, West Virginia
- Died: September 18, 1964 (aged 74); St. Marys, West Virginia
- Batted: Left Threw: Left

MLB debut
- August 19, 1914, for the Washington Senators

Last MLB appearance
- August 19, 1914, for the Washington Senators

MLB statistics
- Win–loss record: 0–0
- Earned run average: 0.00
- Strikeouts: 1
- Stats at Baseball Reference

Teams
- Washington Senators (1914)

Frank John Barron (August 6, 1890 – September 18, 1964) was a Major League Baseball pitcher. Barron played in one game for the Washington Senators on August 19, 1914.

Barron attended West Virginia University, where he played college baseball for the Mountaineers from 1913–1914.
