= Clarence Heise =

American baseball player (1907–1999)

- Pitcher
- Born: August 7, 1907; Topeka, Kansas, U.S.
- Died: April 30, 1999 (aged 91); Winter Park, Florida, U.S.
- Batted: Left Threw: Left

MLB debut
- April 22, 1934, for the St. Louis Cardinals

Last MLB appearance
- April 22, 1934, for the St. Louis Cardinals

MLB statistics
- Win–loss record: 0-0
- Earned run average: 4.50
- Strikeouts: 1
- Stats at Baseball Reference

Teams
- St. Louis Cardinals (1934)

Clarence Edward Heise (August 7, 1907 – May 30, 1999) was an American Major League Baseball pitcher who played in 1934 with the St. Louis Cardinals.

Heise was originally in the Middle Atlantic League organization, playing for the Scottdale, Pennsylvania, Class C team. In August 1933, Cardinals general manager Branch Rickey called his counterpart with the Cubs, William Veeck, Sr. and offered him two pitchers—Heise and Bill Lee. According to Bill Veeck, one of Rickey's favorite tricks was to offer another team two players and trust that the other team would take the wrong one. In the case of Lee and Heise, Rickey knew that all but one Cubs pitcher was right-handed, and expected the Cubs to take Heise, a left-hander. However, on the advice of chief scout Jack Doyle, the Cubs took Lee.

The trade proved to be one of the most lopsided trades of the 1930s, and one of the few instances where Rickey, well known for fleecing other National League teams, got fleeced himself. Heise appeared in only one game during the 1934 season, allowing three hits and three runs in two innings of relief in what would be his only major league action. He never had a plate appearance. He was sent back to the minors after the season, and spent the next three years in the Cardinals, Chicago White Sox and Washington Senators organizations before retiring. Meanwhile, Lee won 169 games in 14 years, 139 of them with the Cubs.

Heise was born in Topeka, Kansas, and died in Winter Park, Florida. His son, Jim, played for the Washington Senators in 1957.

== See also ==
- List of second-generation Major League Baseball players
