= 1997 Major League Baseball draft =

Baseball draft of amateur players

General information
- Date: June 2–3, 1997

Overview
- First selection: Matt Anderson; Detroit Tigers

The 1997 Major League Baseball draft, was an annual choosing of high school and college baseball players, held on June 2 and 3, 1997. A total of 1607 players were drafted over the course of 92 rounds.

== First round selections ==
= All-Star

Pick	Player	Team	Position	School
1	Matt Anderson	Detroit Tigers	P	Rice
2	J. D. Drew	Philadelphia Phillies	OF	Florida State
3	Troy Glaus	Anaheim Angels	3B/P	UCLA
4	Jason Grilli	San Francisco Giants	P	Seton Hall
5	Vernon Wells	Toronto Blue Jays	OF	Bowie High School (TX)
6	Geoff Goetz	New York Mets	P	Jesuit High School (FL)
7	Dan Reichert	Kansas City Royals	P	Pacific
8	J.J. Davis	Pittsburgh Pirates	OF	Baldwin Park High School (CA)
9	Michael Cuddyer	Minnesota Twins	SS, P	Great Bridge High School (VA)
10	Jon Garland	Chicago Cubs	P	Kennedy High School (CA)
11	Chris Enochs	Oakland Athletics	P	West Virginia
12	Aaron Akin	Florida Marlins	P	Cowley CC (KS)
13	Kyle Peterson	Milwaukee Brewers	P	Stanford
14	Brandon Larson	Cincinnati Reds	SS	LSU
15	Jason Dellaero	Chicago White Sox	SS, P	South Florida
16	Lance Berkman	Houston Astros	1B	Rice
17	John Curtice	Boston Red Sox	P	Great Bridge High School (VA)
18	Mark Mangum	Colorado Rockies	P	Kingwood High School (TX)
19	Ryan Anderson	Seattle Mariners	P	Divine Child High School (MI)
20	Adam Kennedy	St. Louis Cardinals	2B	Cal State Northridge
21	Eric DuBose	Oakland Athletics (Note: Pick from Baltimore Orioles as compensation for signing of free agent Mike Bordick)	P	Mississippi State
22	Jayson Werth	Baltimore Orioles	C, OF	Glenwood High School (IL)
23	Donnie Bridges	Montreal Expos	P	Oak Grove High School (MS)
24	Tyrell Godwin	New York Yankees (Note: Pick from Texas Rangers as compensation for signing of free agent John Wetteland)	OF	East Bladen High School (NC)
25	Glenn Davis	Los Angeles Dodgers	1B	Vanderbilt
26	Darnell McDonald	Baltimore Orioles (Note: Pick from New York Yankees as compensation for signing of free agent David Wells)	OF	Cherry Creek High School (CO)
27	Kevin Nicholson	San Diego Padres	SS	Stetson
28	Tim Drew	Cleveland Indians	P, OF	Lowndes High School (GA)
29	Troy Cameron	Atlanta Braves	SS	St. Thomas Aquinas High School (FL)
30	Jack Cust	Arizona Diamondbacks	1B	Immaculata High School (NJ)
31	Jason Standridge	Tampa Bay Devil Rays	P	Hewitt-Trussville High School (AL)

== Supplemental first round selections ==
Pick	Player	Team	Position	School
32	Nathan Haynes	Oakland Athletics (Note: Supplemental pick for loss of free agent Mike Bordick)	OF	Pinole Valley High School (CA)
33	Kyle Kane	Chicago White Sox (Note: Supplemental pick for loss of free agent Alex Fernandez)	RHP	Saddleback College
34	Brett Caradonna	Chicago White Sox (Note: Supplemental pick for loss of free agent Kevin Tapani)	OF	El Capitan High School (CA)
35	Mark Fischer	Boston Red Sox (Note: Supplemental pick for loss of free agent Roger Clemens)	OF	Georgia Tech
36	Ntema Ndungidi	Baltimore Orioles (Note: Supplemental pick for loss of free agent David Wells)	OF	Collège Édouard-Montpetit
37	Chris Stowe	Montreal Expos (Note: Supplemental pick for loss of free agent Mel Rojas)	P	Chancellor High School (VA)
38	Scott Hodges	Montreal Expos (Note: Supplemental pick for loss of free agent Moisés Alou)	3B, OF	Henry Clay High School (KY)
39	Jason Romano	Texas Rangers (Note: Supplemental pick for loss of free agent Mike Stanton)	3B	Hillsborough High School (FL)
40	Ryan Bradley	New York Yankees (Note: Supplemental pick for loss of free agent John Wetteland)	P	Arizona State
41	Jason Fitzgerald	Cleveland Indians (Note: Supplemental pick for loss of free agent Albert Belle)	3B, OF	Tulane
42	Denny Wagner	Oakland Athletics (Note: Supplemental pick for loss of free agent Torey Lovullo)	P	Virginia Tech
43	Aaron Myette	Chicago White Sox (Note: Supplemental pick for loss of free agent Don Slaught)	P	Central Arizona College
44	Bryan Hebson	Montreal Expos (Note: Supplemental pick for loss of free agent Mark Leiter)	P	Auburn
45	Thomas Pittman	Montreal Expos (Note: Supplemental pick for loss of free agent Jeff Fassero)	1B	East St. John High School (LA)
46	Jim Parque	Chicago White Sox (Note: Supplemental pick for loss of free agent Danny Tartabull)	P	UCLA
47	T.J. Tucker	Montreal Expos (Note: Supplemental pick for loss of free agent Lenny Webster)	P	River Ridge High School (FL)
48	Shane Arthurs	Montreal Expos (Note: Supplemental pick for loss of free agent Andy Stankiewicz)	P	Westmoore High School (OK)
49	Dan McKinley	San Francisco Giants (Note: Supplemental pick for failure to sign 1996 No.1 choice Matt White)	OF	Arizona State
50	Matthew LeCroy	Minnesota Twins (Note: Supplemental pick for failure to sign 1996 No.1 choice Travis Lee)	C	Clemson
51	Rocky Biddle	Chicago White Sox (Note: Supplemental pick for failure to sign 1996 No.1 choice Bobby Seay)	P	Long Beach State
52	Tootie Myers	Montreal Expos (Note: Supplemental pick for failure to sign 1996 No.1 choice John Patterson)	OF	Petal High School (MS)

== Other notable players ==
- Randy Wolf, 2nd round, 54th overall by the Philadelphia Phillies
- Scott Linebrink, 2nd round, 56th overall by the San Francisco Giants
- Tyler Walker, 2nd round, 58th overall by the New York Mets
- Jeff Weaver, 2nd round, 62nd overall by the Chicago White Sox, but did not sign
- Aaron Cook, 2nd round, 70th overall by the Colorado Rockies
- Rick Ankiel, 2nd round, 72nd overall by the St. Louis Cardinals
- Chase Utley, 2nd round, 76th overall by the Los Angeles Dodgers, but did not sign
- Jeremy Affeldt, 3rd round, 91st overall by the Kansas City Royals
- John Grabow, 3rd round, 92nd overall by the Pittsburgh Pirates
- Scott Downs, 3rd round, 94th overall by the Chicago Cubs
- Eric Byrnes, 4th round, 130th overall by the Houston Astros, but did not sign
- Chone Figgins, 4th round, 132nd overall by the Colorado Rockies
- Xavier Nady, 4th round, 134th overall by the St. Louis Cardinals, but did not sign
- Derrick Turnbow, 5th round, 146th overall by the Philadelphia Phillies
- Michael Young, 5th round, 149th overall by the Toronto Blue Jays
- DeWayne Wise, 5th round, 158th overall by the Cincinnati Reds
- Randy Choate, 5th round, 169th overall by the New York Yankees
- Horacio Ramírez, 5th round, 172nd overall by the Atlanta Braves
- Matt Wise, 6th round, 177th overall by the Anaheim Angels
- Tim Hudson, 6th round, 185th overall by the Oakland Athletics
- Mike Lamb, 7th round, 227th overall by the Texas Rangers
- Cliff Lee, 8th round, 246th overall by the Florida Marlins, but did not sign
- Scott Williamson, 9th round, 278th overall by the Cincinnati Reds
- Toby Hall, 9th round, 294th overall by the Tampa Bay Devil Rays
- Garrett Atkins, 10th round, 300th overall by the New York Mets, but did not sign
- Michael Wuertz, 11th round, 334th overall by the Chicago Cubs
- Jerry Hairston Jr., 11th round, 345th overall by the Baltimore Orioles
- Joel Piñeiro, 12th round, 373rd overall by the Seattle Mariners
- Ross Gload, 13th round, 396th overall by the Florida Marlins
- Jeremy Guthrie, 15th round, 450th overall by the New York Mets, but did not sign
- Jason Michaels, 15th round, 464th overall by the St. Louis Cardinals, but did not sign
- Shawn Camp, 16th round, 500th overall by the San Diego Padres
- Johnny Estrada, 17th round, 506th overall by the Philadelphia Phillies
- David Eckstein, 19th round, 581st overall by the Boston Red Sox
- Mark Hendrickson, 20th round, 599th overall by the Toronto Blue Jays
- Tim Redding, 20th round, 610th overall by the Houston Astros
- J. C. Romero, 21st round, 633rd overall by the Minnesota Twins
- D. J. Carrasco, 26th round, 795th overall by the Baltimore Orioles
- Mike González, 30th round, 902nd overall by the Pittsburgh Pirates
- Nick Punto, 33rd round, 993rd overall by the Minnesota Twins, but did not sign
- Alex Cintrón, 36th round, 1103rd overall by the Arizona Diamondbacks
- Brandon Lyon, 37th round, 1110th overall by the New York Mets, but did not sign
- Scot Shields, 38th round, 1137th overall by the Anaheim Angels
- Bill Duplissea, 39th round, 1185th overall by the Baltimore Orioles, but did not sign
- Orlando Hudson, 43rd round, 1280th overall by the Toronto Blue Jays
- David DeJesus, 43rd round, 1281st overall by the New York Mets, but did not sign
- Brad Hawpe, 46th round, 1344th overall by the Toronto Blue Jays, but did not sign
- Chad Qualls, 52nd round, 1444th overall by the Toronto Blue Jays, but did not sign
- Aaron Heilman, 55th round, 1488th overall by the New York Yankees, but did not sign
- Heath Bell, 69th round, 1583rd overall by the Tampa Bay Devil Rays, but did not sign
- Willie Harris, 90th round, 1605th overall by the Tampa Bay Devil Rays, but did not sign

=== NFL players drafted ===
- Javon Walker, 12th round, 366th overall by the Florida Marlins
- Antwaan Randle El, 14th round, 424th overall by the Chicago Cubs, but did not sign
- Joe Hall, 29th round, 865th overall by the Detroit Tigers, but did not sign
- Marques Tuiasosopo, 34th round, 1023rd overall by the Minnesota Twins, but did not sign
- Freddie Mitchell, 47th round, 1379th overall by the Tampa Bay Devil Rays, but did not sign

=== NHL players drafted ===
- Paul Manning 20th round, 619th overall by the New York Yankees

== See also ==
- Major League Baseball
- Major League Baseball draft
- List of MLB first overall draft choices
- Rule 5 draft

Preceded by Kris Benson	1st Overall Picks; Matt Anderson	Succeeded by Pat Burrell
