= Jim Heise =

American baseball player (1930–2011)

- Pitcher
- Born: October 2, 1930; Scottdale, Pennsylvania, U.S.
- Died: April 21, 2011 (aged 80); Orlando, Florida, U.S.
- Batted: Right Threw: Right

MLB debut
- June 29, 1957, for the Washington Senators

Last MLB appearance
- July 30, 1957, for the Washington Senators

MLB statistics
- Win–loss record: 0–3
- Earned run average: 8.05
- Strikeouts: 8
- Stats at Baseball Reference

Teams
- Washington Senators (1957)

James Edward Heise (October 2, 1930 – April 21, 2011) was an American Major League Baseball pitcher.

Heise attended West Virginia University, where he played college baseball for the Mountaineers from 1953–1956. He was signed by the Washington Senators as an amateur free agent in 1956, and played briefly for the Senators in 1957.

Heise was the son of Clarence Heise, also a Major League Baseball pitcher.

== See also ==
- List of second-generation Major League Baseball players
