= Jedd Gyorko =

American baseball player (born 1988)

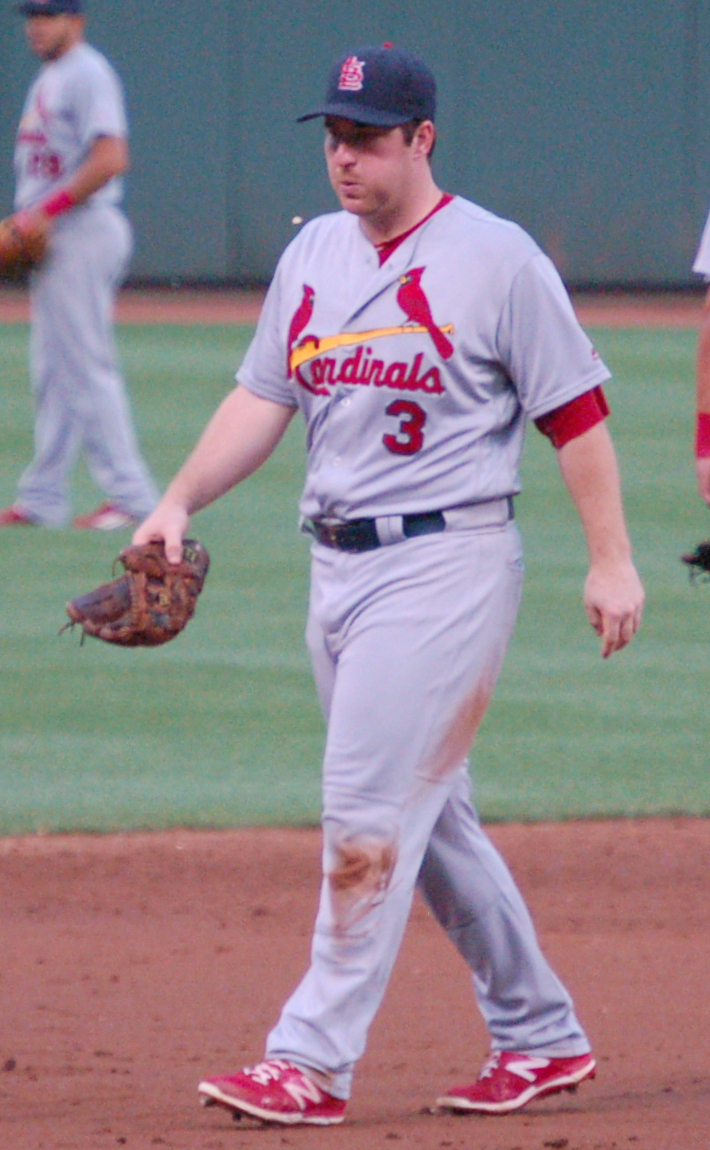
- Gyorko with the St. Louis Cardinals in 2016

West Virginia Mountaineers
- Second baseman / Third baseman
- Born: September 23, 1988 (age 38); Morgantown, West Virginia, U.S.
- Batted: Right Threw: Right

MLB debut
- April 1, 2013, for the San Diego Padres

Last MLB appearance
- September 27, 2020, for the Milwaukee Brewers

MLB statistics
- Batting average: .245
- Home runs: 121
- Runs batted in: 370
- Stats at Baseball Reference

Teams
- San Diego Padres (2013–2015); St. Louis Cardinals (2016–2019); Los Angeles Dodgers (2019); Milwaukee Brewers (2020)

Jedd Lindon Gyorko (/ˈdʒɜːrkoʊ/ JUR-koh; born September 23, 1988) is an American former professional baseball second baseman and third baseman, and current college baseball coach for the West Virginia Mountaineers. He played in Major League Baseball (MLB) for the San Diego Padres, St. Louis Cardinals, Los Angeles Dodgers, and Milwaukee Brewers. He was previously the manager of the West Virginia Black Bears of the MLB Draft League.

Gyorko attended University High School in Morgantown, West Virginia. Playing for the school's baseball team as a shortstop, he was named one of the best baseball players in the state. He then enrolled at West Virginia University, and set numerous school records for the West Virginia Mountaineers baseball program. Gyorko won the 2010 Brooks Wallace Award as the best shortstop in the National Collegiate Athletic Association's Division I.

The Padres selected Gyorko in the second round of the 2010 MLB draft. Playing in minor league baseball, Gyorko shifted to third base, and developed into one of the best prospects in baseball. He made the Padres' Opening Day roster as their starting second baseman in 2013. The Padres signed Gyorko to a five-year contract extension worth $35 million early in the 2014 season, but traded him to St. Louis after the 2015 season. The Cardinals traded him to the Dodgers in 2019, and he signed with the Brewers for the 2020 season.

== Early life ==
Gyorko was born on September 23, 1988, in Morgantown, West Virginia, to Randall and Penny Gyorko. His family also had a home on Cheat Lake, where he stayed often in his youth. He was a fan of the Pittsburgh Pirates of Major League Baseball (MLB).

When he was five years old, his father, Randall, and Jerry Mahoney, a former college baseball player at West Virginia University (WVU) and WVU employee, began to train Gyorko to become a baseball player through various instructional drills. They trained at WVU's Shell Building, which Mahoney had access to, when the weather was too cold to train outdoors. In youth baseball, Gyorko played as a second baseman.

Gyorko attended University High School in Morgantown. He played for the school's baseball, American football, and basketball teams. He was an infielder for the baseball team, but primarily played shortstop. In baseball, Gyorko was named to the All-Conference team all four years of his high school career. He was also named to the All-State team three times. Gyorko also played American Legion baseball for four years. He led his American Legion teams to state championships in 2004 and 2007.

Gyorko played quarterback and wide receiver for the football team, and shooting guard and point guard for the basketball team. In basketball, Gyorko was named All-Conference as a sophomore. University won the conference championship in Gyorko's junior year, as he averaged 17.4 points per game (PPG), second best in the conference. He was named his conference's Player of the Year and to the All-State second team. In his senior year, he averaged 18.2 PPG and was named to the All-State first team.

== College career ==
After weighing scholarship offers to play college baseball from WVU, St. John's University and Clemson University, Gyorko chose to remain near home, enrolling at WVU to play college baseball for the West Virginia Mountaineers baseball team, which competed in the Big East Conference of the National Collegiate Athletic Association's (NCAA) Division I. Gyorko shifted to second base for his first year to accommodate senior Tyler Kuhn, who played shortstop. He had a 21-game hitting streak to start his tenure with the Mountaineers, registering a .500 batting average during the streak. As a freshman, Gyorko finished the season with a .409 batting average with eight home runs and 63 runs batted in (RBIs), winning the Big East Rookie of the Year Award. He was also named to the All-Big East's second team, and the Freshman All-America teams of Louisville Slugger and the National Collegiate Baseball Writers Association. In 2009, he played collegiate summer baseball for the Brewster Whitecaps of the Cape Cod Baseball League (CCBL), where he was named a league all-star, but he required shoulder surgery and was unable to play the entire summer season.

Following Kuhn's graduation, Gyorko returned to shortstop for the Mountaineers. In his sophomore season, Gyorko batted .421 with eight home runs and 58 RBIs. He set a Mountaineers single-season record with 28 doubles. He was named First Team All-Big East and Second Team All-American by Louisville Slugger. After the season, he joined the United States national collegiate baseball team, but did not make the final roster. He joined Brewster for the CCBL season, playing second base. He was named to the CCBL All-Star Team, and he competed in the home run derby, held at Fenway Park.

Prior to Gyorko's junior season in 2010 he was named the preseason Big East Player of the Year and a Third Team All-American by Baseball America. Continuing to play as a shortstop, Gyorko batted .381 with 19 home runs and 57 RBIs in his junior year. He won the 2010 Brooks Wallace Award as the best shortstop in NCAA Division I. By the end of his junior season, Gyorko established himself as the Mountaineers career leader in batting average (.404), doubles (73), extra-base hits (113) and the single-season leader in walks (43), doubles (28), extra-base hits (48), and total bases (192). He also tied the WVU records for career home runs (35) and single-season home runs (19). Gyorko was considered a potential first- or second-round pick in the MLB draft following his junior year, Though he had one more year of eligibility remaining at West Virginia, Gyorko said "it has always been my dream to play professionally" and that he would "go and play for a living" after his junior year.

== Professional career ==
=== Draft and minor leagues ===
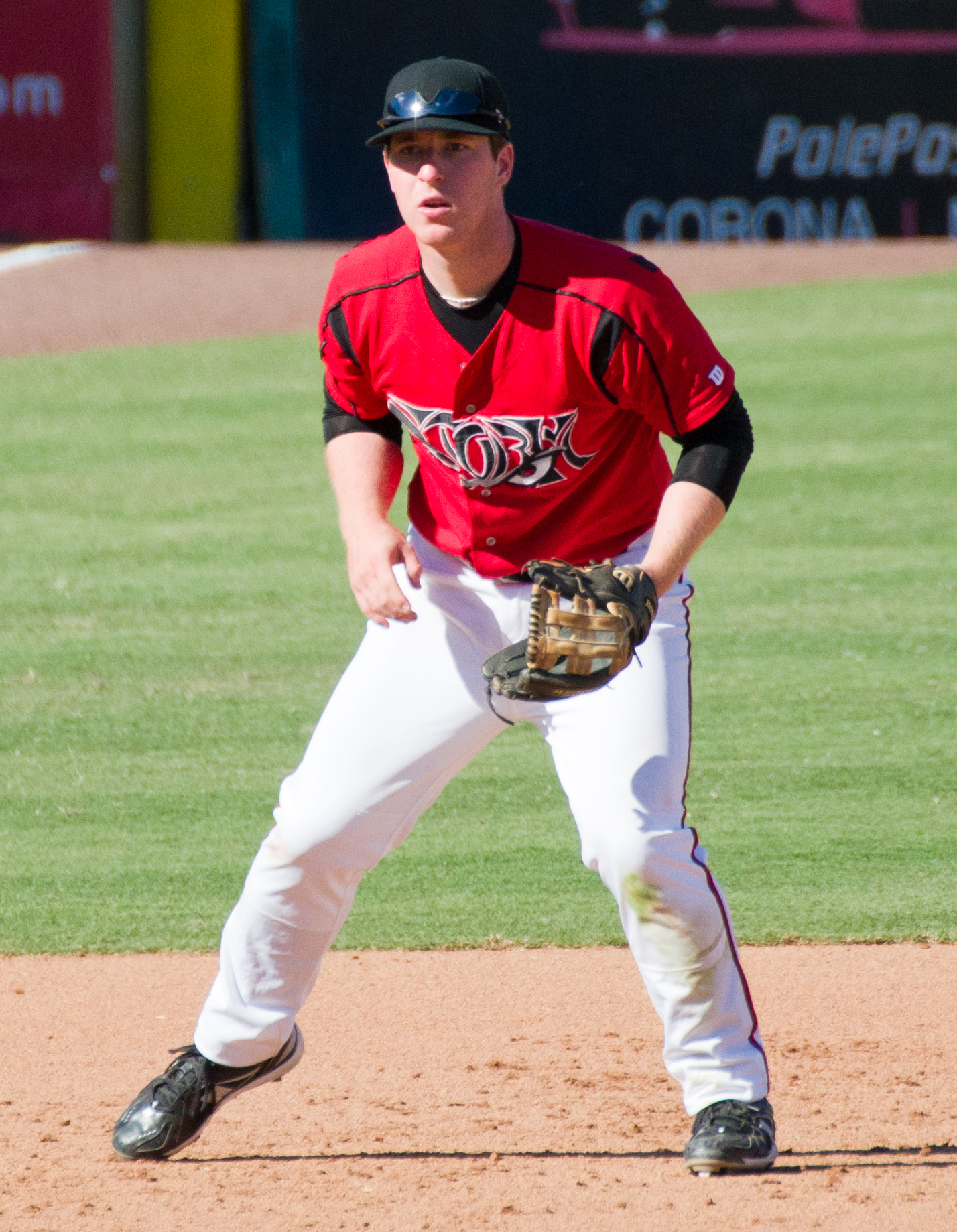
Gyorko with the Lake Elsinore Storm in 2011

Professional teams coveted Gyorko for his hitting ability, though they did not expect him to play shortstop at the professional level. Though his throwing arm was viewed as strong enough to allow him to play at any position in the infield, analysts believed that Gyorko would not have sufficient range or speed to play shortstop professionally, and Gyorko understood he would likely change positions. Regarding his defense, Gyorko said "where I play [on defense] isn't a big concern for me. I'm just ready for this chance to live a dream and it will all work out."

The San Diego Padres drafted Gyorko in the second round, with the 59th overall selection, of the 2010 Major League Baseball draft. They selected Gyorko as a third baseman. Gyorko signed with the Padres quickly, receiving a $614,700 signing bonus, while other draft selections held out for higher signing bonuses. After signing with the Padres, Gyorko was assigned to the Eugene Emeralds of the Class A Short Season Northwest League, where he hit .330 with five home runs, 18 RBIs, and 35 hits in 26 games. He was then promoted to the Fort Wayne TinCaps of the Class A Midwest League. He hit a home run in his first at-bat with the TinCaps. Gyorko batted .284 with 46 hits in 42 games.

Gyorko began the 2011 season with the Lake Elsinore Storm of the Class A-Advanced California League. He split time between third base and designated hitter, as fellow third base prospect Edinson Rincon was also a member of the Storm. Gyorko appeared in the California/Carolina League All-Star Game, and was named the Top Star as he batted 2-for-4 with a run scored and one RBI. Gyorko batted .365 with 18 home runs and 74 RBIs for Lake Elsinore before he was promoted to the San Antonio Missions of the Double-A Texas League, following the promotion of Missions third baseman James Darnell. In 576 at-bats for Lake Elsinore and San Antonio, Gyorko had 192 hits, 25 home runs, 114 RBIs, a batting average of .333 and a .400 on-base percentage (OBP). Following the season, he competed in the Arizona Fall League. He was named the 10th best prospect in the AFL that year, after he led the league with a .437 batting average.

Gyorko began the 2012 season with San Antonio, where he batted .262 with six home runs and 17 RBIs in 34 games. He was promoted to the Tucson Padres of the Triple-A Pacific Coast League (PCL) in mid-May, as the Padres promoted Everth Cabrera and Alexi Amarista from Tucson, released Orlando Hudson, and placed Jason Bartlett on the disabled list. He continued to split his time between second base and third base at each level after playing third in his previous minor league seasons. Baseball America ranked Gyorko as the 50th best prospect in their midseason ranking of prospects, after ranking him 98th coming into the 2012 season. With Tucson, Gyorko hit .328 with 24 home runs and 83 RBIs. He finished the season with a combined .311 batting average, .373 OBP, and .547 slugging percentage (SLG), with 30 home runs. In 410 plate appearances, he struck out only 68 times. Baseball America named Gyorko the best third baseman in Triple-A.

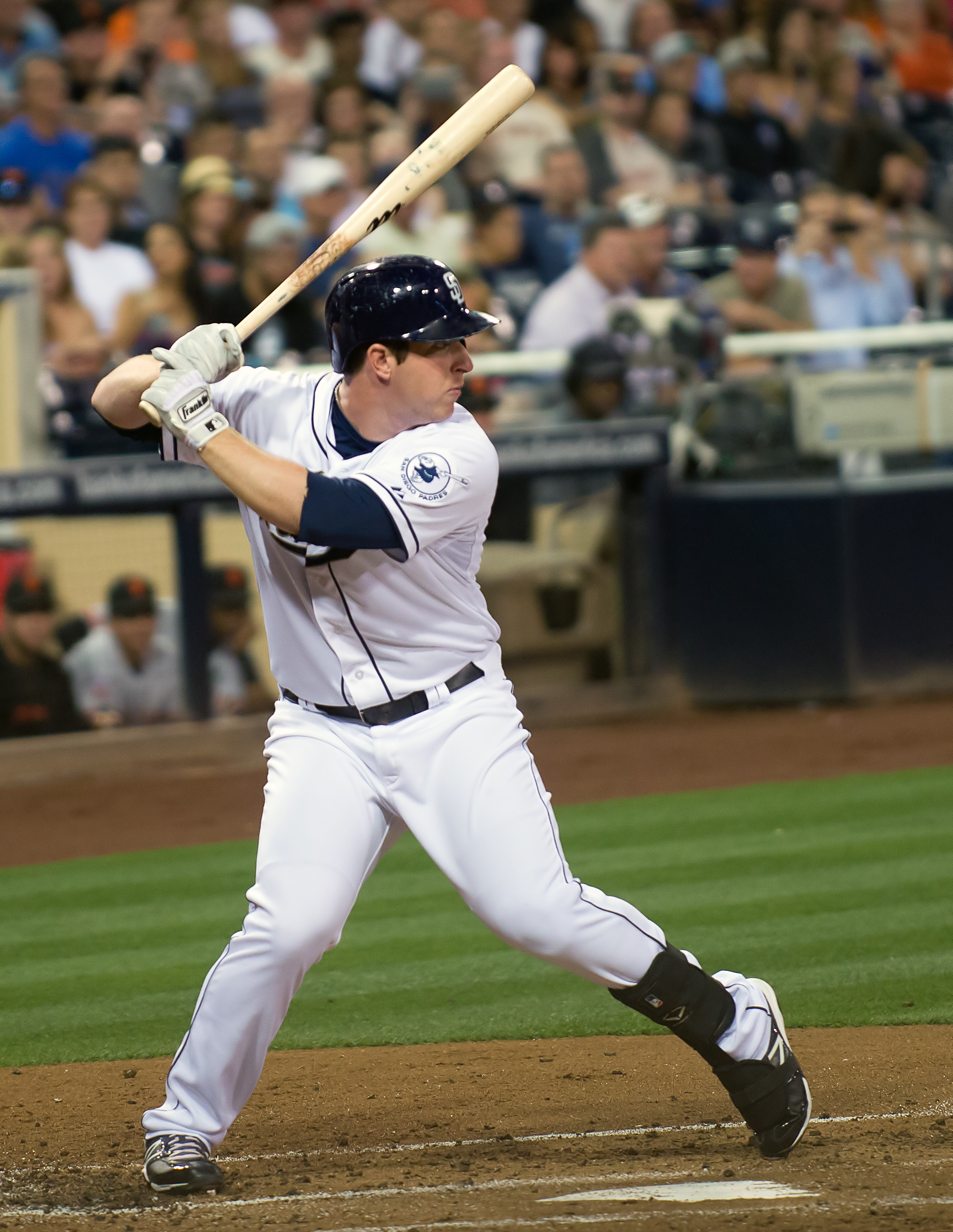
Gyorko batting for the San Diego Padres in 2013

=== San Diego Padres (2013–2015) ===
==== 2013 season ====
The Padres invited him to spring training in 2013, giving him a chance to win a job as the starting second baseman for the 2013 Padres. Gyorko impressed Padres' manager Bud Black with his hitting ability and defense at second base. With injuries to infielders Chase Headley and Logan Forsythe, Gyorko made the Padres' Opening Day roster, with the opportunity to alternate between second and third base. In his MLB debut, on April 1, 2013, Gyorko started at second base, but later shifted to third base. He also recorded his first MLB hit, a double off of Jonathan Niese. He hit his first major league home run off of Scott Feldman of the Chicago Cubs on May 1, 2013. His six home runs in May tied Evan Gattis for the most among MLB rookies. Gyorko had a .280 batting average through June 10, and missed the next 30 games due to a groin injury.

Gyorko batted .100 in July, but he improved his on-base percentage and on-base plus slugging in August, and passed Gattis with 16 home runs. He continued to swing at pitches outside of the strike zone and not draw enough walks. Gyorko finished the season as the team leader in both home runs (23) and RBIs (63). He led all MLB rookies that season in OBP (.301), SLG (.444), and home runs, and his home run total was the third-most ever by an MLB rookie second baseman. (Note: Dan Uggla hit 27 in 2006, and Joe Gordon had 24 in 1938.) He broke the Padres' record for home runs by a second baseman, passing Bret Boone's 19 in 2000. Gyorko was also the first MLB rookie second baseman to lead his team in RBIs. Additionally, he became just the second rookie to lead the Padres in either category since Nate Colbert in San Diego's inaugural season in 1969. He was named to Baseball America's All-Rookie Team, and finished sixth in NL Rookie of the Year balloting. (Note: Finished behind José Fernández, Yasiel Puig, Shelby Miller, Hyun-jin Ryu, and Julio Teherán.)

==== 2014 season ====
Going into spring training in 2014, Gyorko began focusing on improving his plate discipline, while maintaining his aggressiveness in swinging at hittable pitches. He also lost weight in an effort to improve his flexibility. Gyorko agreed to a $510,900 salary for the 2014 season. On April 14, Gyorko signed a five-year extension with the Padres worth $35 million, which was the third largest for a player with only one year of service in the majors. (Note: Andrelton Simmons (seven years, $58 million) and Ryan Braun (eight years, $45 million) were higher.) After committing four errors in his first 25 games, Gyorko increased his infield practice with Glenn Hoffman, the Padres' third base and infield coach.

After struggling to start the season, with a .162 batting average, the Padres placed Gyorko on the 15-day disabled list on June 6 due to plantar fasciitis in his left foot. After missing 44 games, Gyorko was activated off the disabled list on July 28. With his 31st career home run on August 16, Gyorko succeeded Mark Loretta for most home runs as a Padres' second baseman. He batted .260 in his final 222 plate appearances of the year, but ended the season with disappointing numbers: a .210 batting average, .280 OBP, .333 SLG, and ten home runs.

==== 2015 season ====
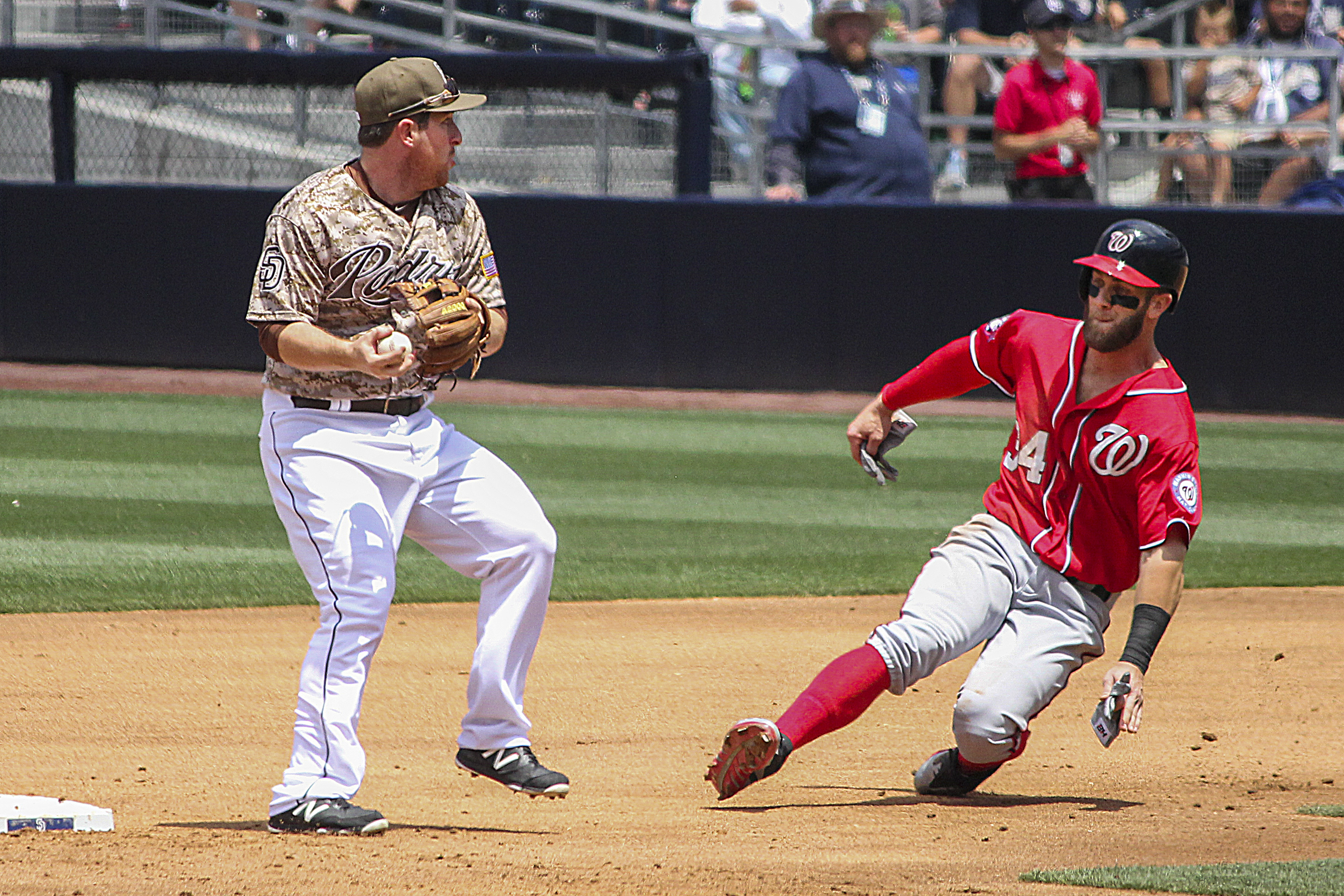
Gyorko (left) and a sliding Bryce Harper, 2015

During the 2014–15 offseason, Gyorko worked to regain the muscle he lost during the previous offseason. With Matt Kemp and Justin Upton added to the Padres' lineup, Black hoped to reduce the pressure on Gyorko to perform. By late April, with Gyorko off to a 7-for-47 (.147) start to the season, he began to lose playing time to Yangervis Solarte, and to Cory Spangenberg in May and June as he continued to struggle.

On June 10, after hitting .210 with two home runs in 46 games, the Padres demoted Gyorko to the El Paso Chihuahuas of the PCL. Gyorko hit .279 with four home runs in 16 games, before the Padres recalled him on June 30. Gyorko made his first appearance at shortstop as a professional on August 17, and continued to play shortstop throughout the remainder of the season. Gyorko finished the season with a .247 batting average and 16 home runs in 128 games.

=== St. Louis Cardinals (2016–2019) ===
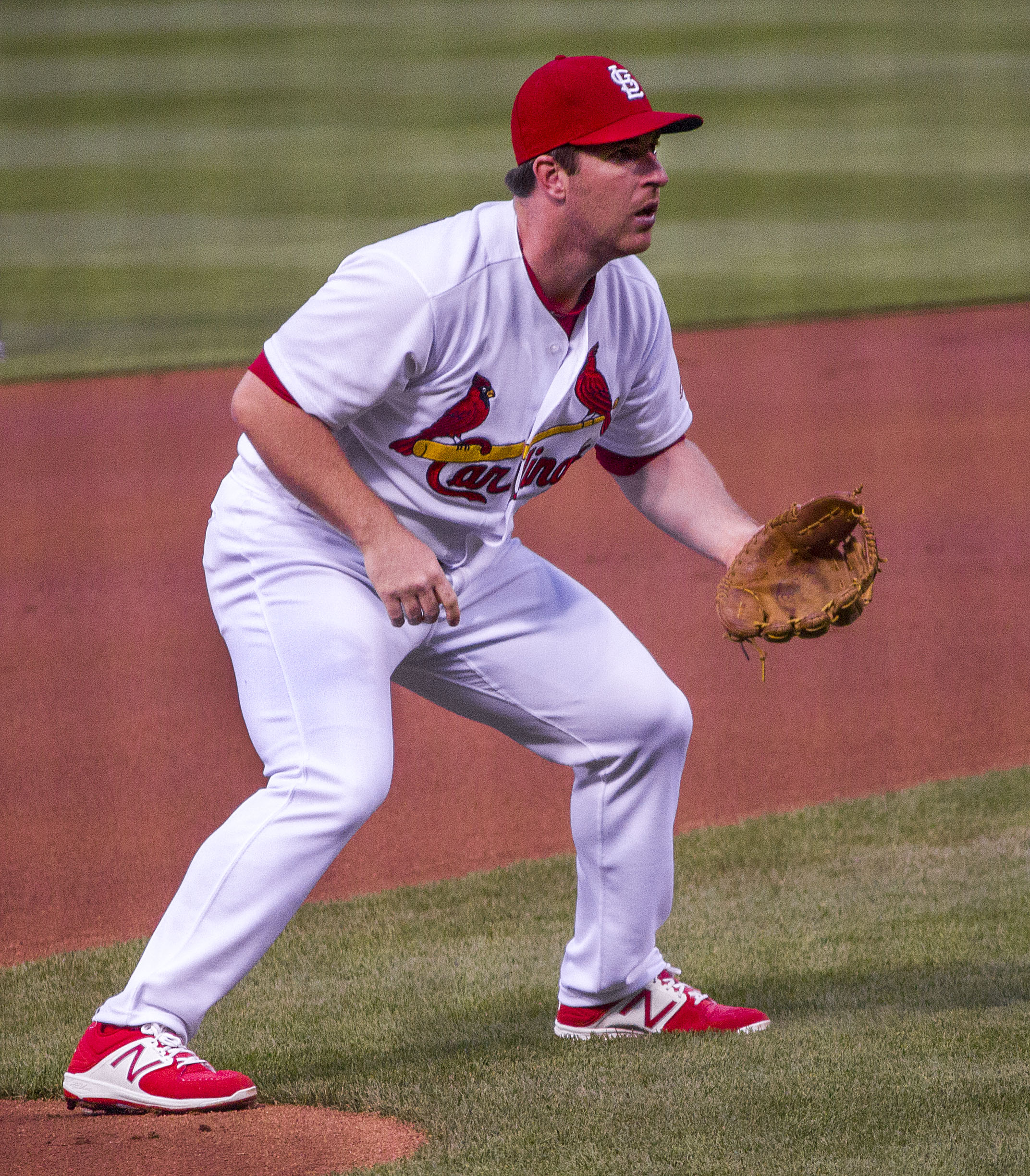
Gyorko playing third base in 2017.

On December 8, 2015, the Padres traded Gyorko to the St. Louis Cardinals in exchange for Jon Jay, while also agreeing to pay $7.5 million towards the remaining $33 million guaranteed by Gyorko's contract. The Cardinals intended to use Gyorko as a backup for second baseman Kolten Wong, third baseman Matt Carpenter, and shortstop Jhonny Peralta. He opened the season as the Cardinals' starting shortstop due to an injury to Peralta. While playing the Pittsburgh Pirates on April 5, he hit his first home run for the Cardinals. Due to the emergence of Aledmys Díaz at shortstop and Wong's struggles, Gyorko received most of his playing time at second base.

In his first five games against the Padres, Gyorko homered in each game, totaling six, and also had 13 hits in 21 at bats with 10 RBIs. He reached 30 home runs for the first time on October 1, 2016, against the Pittsburgh Pirates, also a game-winning hit.

In 2017, the Cardinals shifted Carpenter to first base, with Peralta and Gyorko playing third base. Gyorko became the Cardinals' regular third baseman after the Cardinals designated Peralta for assignment. Gyorko hit 13 home runs in the first half of the season, but only six after the All-Star break. He finished the year batting .272 with twenty home runs and 67 RBIs in 125 games. Despite two stints on the disabled list in 2018, Gyorko still appeared in 125 games, hitting .262 with 11 home runs and 47 RBIs.

Gyorko returned to a utility role in 2019 after the Cardinals acquired Paul Goldschmidt. He played in 38 games for the Cardinals in 2019, batting .194 with two home runs and seven RBIs, before going on the injured list with a strained back. His rehabilitation was complicated by calf and wrist injuries.

=== Los Angeles Dodgers (2019) ===
On July 31, 2019, the Cardinals traded Gyorko to the Los Angeles Dodgers along with international signing bonus space and cash considerations in exchange for Tony Cingrani and minor leaguer Jeffry Abreu. He began a rehabilitation assignment with the Tulsa Drillers of the Texas League on August 3. Gyorko debuted with the Dodgers on August 18 against the Atlanta Braves, playing first base and going two for four at the plate. He appeared in 24 games for the Dodgers, with five hits in 36 at-bats (.139). In 2019, he had the slowest sprint speed of all major league third basemen, at 23.8 feet/second. The Dodgers declined Gyorko's contract option following the 2019 season, making him a free agent.

=== Milwaukee Brewers (2020) ===
On January 10, 2020, Gyorko signed a one-year contract for $2 million with the Milwaukee Brewers. The contract gave the Brewers an option for the 2021 season. In 42 games for the Brewers in 2020, Gyorko slashed .248/.333/.504 with nine home runs and 17 RBIs. His option was declined after the season, making him a free agent.

== Coaching career ==
On April 12, 2021, Gyorko was announced as the manager of the West Virginia Black Bears for the inaugural season of the MLB Draft League. In his first season, he led the Black Bears to a 30–19–6 record and a second-place finish. Gyorko returned to his managerial post with the team for the 2022 season, posting a 48–30 record and leading the franchise to its first-ever Draft League championship. He did not return to the franchise for the 2023 season and was replaced by fellow Morgantown native David Carpenter, ending his stint with the team with a 78–49–6 record.

On September 18, 2024, West Virginia University announced that Gyorko had been named by Mountaineers head coach Steve Sabins as a Special Assistant to the Head Coach.

== Personal life ==
Gyorko is the youngest of three sons. His older brother, Scott, attended WVU and played college football for the West Virginia Mountaineers football team as a linebacker. Jedd attends all Mountaineers football games. Gyorko used the money he received in his signing bonus to build a house in Morgantown near his parents' house. Gyorko intends on finishing his bachelor's degree in business.

Gyorko married his wife Karley in 2011. While he played with the Padres, the couple lived within walking distance of Petco Park, the home stadium of the Padres, during the season, and returned to Morgantown during the offseason. Karley gave birth to twin sons in April 2014. They were born premature, and one remained in the hospital for a few extra days for observation. The couple's third child, a daughter, was born in May 2017.

Gyorko is a Christian. Gyorko has said, "Faith has always helped keep me grounded throughout the ups and downs of a season. When I have bad times, I always remember what is most important and that is my faith and my family. I’ve also learned to give the Lord credit regardless whether I have a good or bad game! Nothing I do is my own doing, it’s from the gifts He has given me!"

== See also ==
- San Diego Padres all-time roster
- St. Louis Cardinals all-time roster
