= Fordham, Pennsylvania =

Unincorporated community in Pennsylvania, U.S.

Coordinates: 40°54′54″N 79°01′59″W

Fordham is an unincorporated community in Jefferson County, in the U.S. state of Pennsylvania.

== History ==
A post office was established at Fordham in 1893, and closed the next year in 1894.

== Notable person ==
Steve Harrick, head football coach at West Virginia Tech from 1935 to 1946, was born in Fordham in 1897.
