= Chris Rearick =

American baseball player (born 1987)

- Pitcher
- Born: December 5, 1987 (age 38); Pooler, Georgia, U.S.
- Batted: Left Threw: Left

MLB debut
- April 12, 2015, for the San Diego Padres

Last MLB appearance
- April 25, 2015, for the San Diego Padres

MLB statistics
- Win–loss record: 0–0
- Earned run average: 12.00
- Strikeouts: 4
- Stats at Baseball Reference

Teams
- San Diego Padres (2015)

Christopher Timothy Rearick (born December 5, 1987) is an American former professional baseball pitcher. He played in Major League Baseball (MLB) for the San Diego Padres in 2015.

== Career ==
=== Tampa Bay Rays ===
Rearick was drafted by the Tampa Bay Rays in the 41st round, with the 1,241st overall selection, of the 2010 Major League Baseball draft out of North Georgia College & State University. He made his professional debut with the rookie-level Princeton Rays, posting a 4.73 ERA in 13 games. Rearick spent the 2011 season with the Single-A Bowling Green Hot Rods, compiling a 7-2 record and 1.66 ERA with 89 strikeouts and 20 saves across 50 appearances.

Rearick split the 2012 campaign between the High-A Charlotte Stone Crabs and Double-A Montgomery Biscuits. In 50 appearances out of the bullpen for the two affiliates, he posted a cumulative 4-4 record and 2.70 ERA with 85 strikeouts and 22 saves over 70 innings of work.

=== San Diego Padres ===
On December 13, 2012, Rearick was traded to the San Diego Padres in exchange for Vince Belnome.

On April 10, 2015, Rearick was selected to the 40-man roster and promoted to the major leagues for the first time. In 5 appearances during his rookie campaign, he struggled to a 12.00 ERA with 4 strikeouts over 3 innings pitched. Rearick was designated for assignment by the Padres on August 21.

On August 26, 2015, Rearick was claimed off waivers by the Texas Rangers. However, following the promotion of Andrew Faulkner on August 28, Rearick was designated for assignment by Texas. He was claimed back off waivers by the Padres on August 30. However, on September 2, Rearick was designated for assignment following the promotion of Rocky Gale. He cleared waivers and was sent outright to the Triple-A San Antonio Missions the following day. Rearick was released by the Padres organization on March 26, 2016.

=== Sugar Land Skeeters ===
On April 18, 2016, Rearick signed with the Sugar Land Skeeters of the Atlantic League of Professional Baseball. In 35 appearances out of the bullpen for Sugar Land, he struggled to a 3-2 record and 6.61 ERA with 34 strikeouts across 32 2/3 innings pitched. Rearick was subsequently released by the Skeeters.

=== Bridgeport Bluefish ===
Rearick signed with the Bridgeport Bluefish of the Atlantic League of Professional Baseball to finish out the 2016 season. After starting the season with the Skeeters as a reliever, he converted to a starter with Bridgeport. In 7 games (6 starts) for the Bluefish, Rearick compiled a 2-3 record and 1.89 ERA with 29 strikeouts across 33 1/3 innings pitched.

On March 7, 2017, Rearick re-signed with the Skeeters. He made 9 starts for the Bluefish during the 2017 season, logging a 4-1 record and 3.02 ERA with 60 strikeouts across 47 2/3 innings pitched.

=== Los Angeles Dodgers ===
On June 18, 2017, Rearick signed a minor league contract with the Los Angeles Dodgers. In 5 starts for the Double-A Tulsa Drillers, he struggled to a 6.94 ERA with 19 strikeouts across 23 1/3 innings pitched. Rearick was released by the Dodgers organization on August 10.

On November 1, 2017, Rearick was drafted by the Lancaster Barnstormers in the Bridgeport Bluefish dispersal draft.
