= Vince Belnome =

American baseball player (born 1988)

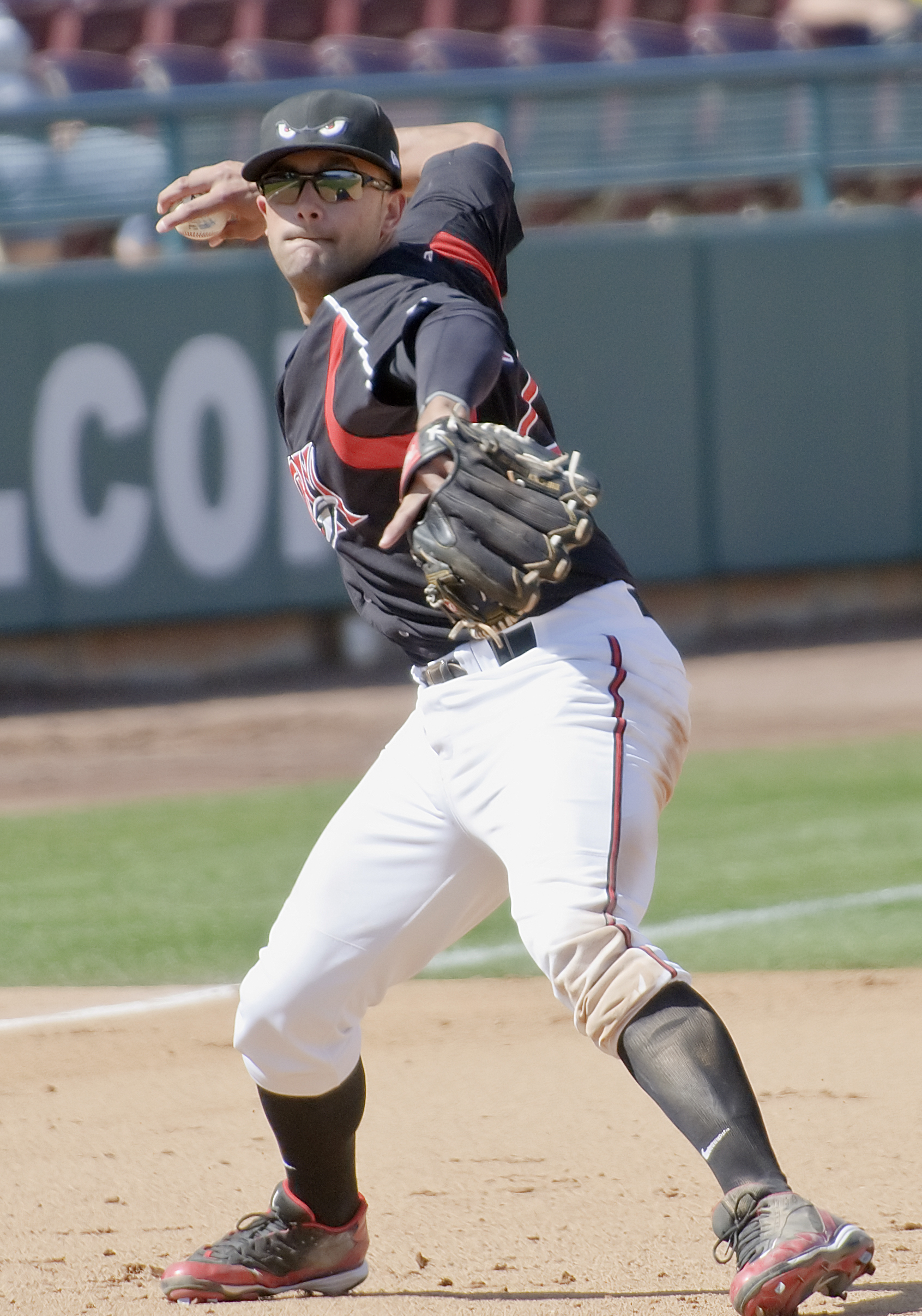
- Belnome with the Lake Elsinore Storm in 2010
- Infielder
- Born: March 11, 1988 (age 38); Coatesville, Pennsylvania, U.S.
- Batted: Left Threw: Right

MLB debut
- July 3, 2014, for the Tampa Bay Rays

Last appearance
- August 19, 2014, for the Tampa Bay Rays

MLB statistics
- Batting average: .100
- Home runs: 0
- Runs batted in: 1
- Stats at Baseball Reference

Teams
- Tampa Bay Rays (2014)

Vincent Belnome (born March 11, 1988) is an American former professional baseball infielder. He played in Major League Baseball (MLB) for the Tampa Bay Rays.

== Career ==
=== San Diego Padres ===
Belnome was drafted by the San Diego Padres in the 28th round, 834th overall in the 2009 Major League Baseball draft. He signed with the Padres on June 15, 2009. He spent the year with the Eugene Emeralds and Fort Wayne TinCaps. Belnome spent the entire 2010 season with the Lake Elsinore Storm. He spent the entire 2011 season with the San Antonio Missions. Belnome spent 2012 with Lake Elsinore and the Tucson Padres.

=== Tampa Bay Rays ===
On December 13, 2012, Belnome was traded to the Tampa Bay Rays in exchange for Chris Rearick. He spent the 2013 season with the Triple-A Durham Bulls, making 127 appearances and hitting .300/.408/.446 with eight home runs and 67 RBI. On November 20, 2013, the Rays added Belnome to their 40-man roster to protect him from the Rule 5 draft.

Belnome was called up to the major leagues on April 3, 2014, but was sent back down the next day without appearing in a game, briefly becoming a phantom ballplayer. Belnome made his major league debut on July 3. In 4 games during his rookie campaign, he went 1-for-10 (.100) with 1 RBI and 3 walks. Belnome was designated for assignment by the Rays on November 3. He cleared waivers and was sent outright to Triple-A Durham on November 7.

Belnome began the 2015 campaign with Triple-A Durham, playing in 46 games and hitting .169/.293/.225 with no home runs, six RBI, and one stolen base. On July 22, 2015, Belnome was released by the Rays organization.

=== New York Mets ===
On July 28, 2015, Belnome signed a minor league contract with the New York Mets organization. In 37 appearances for the Double-A Binghamton Mets, he slashed .252/.331/.370 with two home runs and 20 RBI. Belnome elected free agency following the season on November 6.
