= Chris Enochs =

American baseball player

Chris Enochs is a former Minor League Baseball pitcher.

== Career ==
Enochs played baseball for the West Virginia University Mountaineers. In 1996, he played collegiate summer baseball with the Falmouth Commodores of the Cape Cod Baseball League. Enochs was selected 11th overall in the 1997 Major League Baseball draft by the Oakland Athletics. He played for several minor league teams from 1997 through 2005.

== Personal life ==
He is married and has two daughters.
