= Mesa Jewels =

- 1929–1947; (1929, 1947); Mesa, Arizona

Minor league affiliations
- Class: Class D (1929); Class C (1947)
- League: Arizona State League (1929); Arizona-Texas League (1947)

Major league affiliations
- Team: None

Minor league titles
- League titles (0): None

Team data
- Name: Mesa Jewels (1929); Mesa Orphans (1947)
- Ballpark: Rendezvous Park (1929, 1947)

The Mesa Jewels were a minor league baseball team based in Mesa, Arizona, In 1929, the Jewels played a partial season as members of the Class D level Arizona State League, before folding during the season. The 1947 Mesa Orphans succeeded the Jewels in minor league play, finishing in fourth place as members of the Class C level Arizona-Texas League after joining the league during the season. Both Mesa teams hosted minor league home games at Rendezvous Park.

== History ==
=== 1929 Mesa Jewels ===
Minor league baseball first came to Mesa in 1929, when the Mesa "Jewels" became members of the Class D level Arizona State League, before folding during the season.

On July 24, 1929, Mesa had a 20–38 record under managers Bill Whittaker, Ernie Lloyd and Lee Dempsey when the franchise folded. Because the league was left with five teams, Mesa's opponents were given 3 wins and 1 loss for each scheduled series with Mesa. This gave the Mesa franchise a 28–61 overall record statistically. Mesa ended the season placing sixth in the official league standings, finishing 31½ games behind the first place Bisbee Bees, who had a 60–30 record. The Miami Miners (50–40), Globe Bears (48–42), Tucson Cowboys (43–47) and Phoenix Senators (40–49) finished ahead of the folded Mesa franchise. Mesa did not qualify for the 1929 playoffs, won by Miami over Bisbee. The Mesa franchise was replaced by the El Paso Texans in the 1930 Arizona State League.

The Mesa use of the "Jewels" moniker corresponds to local geology and regional industry. Arizona has a long history of gemstone mining and production.

=== 1947 Mesa Orphans ===
Minor league baseball returned to Mesa during the 1947 season. On June 22, 1947, the Juarez Indios, faced with stadium issues at their home ballpark, folded from the six–team Class C level Arizona-Texas League with a 41–20 record. The Mesa Orphans began play as the replacement for Juarez on June 27, 1947. Mesa compiled a 20–49 record over the remainder of the season under manager Edward Wheeler, who managed the team in both locations. Overall, the Juarez/Mesa team compiled a 61–69 overall record to place fourth in the final league standings.

The Orphans finished 19½ games behind the first place Phoenix Senators, who finished with an 82–51 record. The Tucson Cowboys (80–52), Bisbee Yanks (74–59), Globe-Miami Browns (53–77) and El Paso Texans (44–86) completed the final Arizona-Texas League standings. With their stadium issues resolved, Juarez rejoined the Arizona-Texas League in 1948, replacing the Mesa location.

Today, Mesa hosts the Mesa Solar Sox, who began play as members of the Arizona Fall League in 1992.

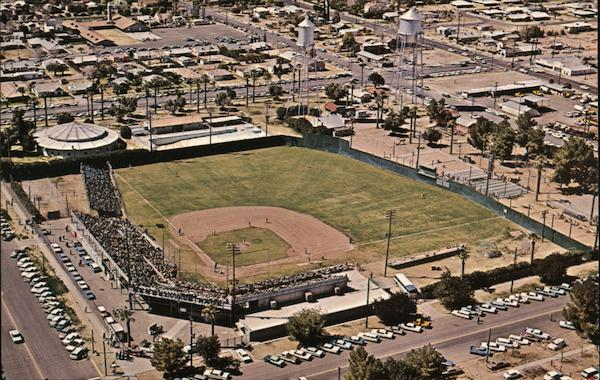
(1952) Rendezvous Park, Mesa, Arizona

== The ballpark ==
The Mesa Jewels and Mesa Orphans both hosted minor league home games at Rendezvous Park. Besides minor league baseball, the ballpark also hosted spring training games for the Chicago Cubs and Oakland Athletics. The Arizona State Sun Devils baseball team also played at the ballpark on occasion.

The park which contained the stadium was established in 1895, known initially as Depot Park, in reference to a nearby railway station. After the closure of the neighboring railway station, the park came to be known as Drew's Park, before being renamed to Rendezvous Park in the early 1920's. Rendezvous Park was torn down in 1976.

Today, the site hosts the Mesa Convention Center and an adjoining amphitheater, library and hotel. The Convention Center is located at 201 N. Center Street in Mesa, Arizona.

== Timeline ==
Year(s)	# Yrs.	Team	Level	League	Ballpark
1929	1	Mesa Jewels	Class D	Arizona State League	Rendezvous Park
1947	1	Mesa Orphans	Class D	Arizona-Texas League	Rendezvous Park

== Year–by–year records ==
Year	Record	Finish	Manager	Playoffs/Notes
1929	28–61	6th	Bill Whittaker / Ernie Lloyd / Lee Dempsey	Mesa withdrew July 24 (20–38). Opponents given 3 wins and 1 loss for each series.
1947	61–69	4th	Edward Wheeler	Juarez (41–20) transferred to Mesa June 22

== Notable alumni ==
- Edward Wheeler (1947, MGR)
