= El Paso Mackmen =

- 1915; El Paso, Texas

Minor league affiliations
- Class: Class D (1915)
- League: Rio Grande Association (1915)

Major league affiliations
- Team: None

Minor league titles
- League titles (0): None
- Conference titles (1): 1915

Team data
- Name: El Paso Mackmen (1915)
- Ballpark: Rio Grande Park (1915)

The El Paso Mackmen were a minor league baseball team based in El Paso, Texas. In 1915, the Mackmen played as members of the short–lived Class D level Rio Grande Association, with El Paso finishing in second place, as the league permanently folded during the season. The Mackmen hosted minor league home games at Rio Grande Park.

== History ==
The Mackmen were immediately preceded by the semi-pro El Paso Mavericks, who played in the Copper League and won the 1913 league championship. Earlier semi–pro teams began play in El Paso in 1892.

On February 18, 1915, the Rio Grande Association was formed in El Paso. The league franchises and structure were established after an organizational meeting was held at the Hotel Sheldon, in El Paso, Texas.

The Rio Grande Association was formed with six franchises, based in Texas, Arizona and New Mexico: the Albuquerque Dukes, Douglas Miners, Las Cruces Farmers, Phoenix Senators and Tucson Old Pueblos joined El Paso as the charter members. The league was founded by John McCloskey, who previously founded the Texas League. McCloskey managed the El Paso Mackmen, who were nicknamed for him.

After beginning play on April 27, 1915, the Rio Grande Association and the Mackmen were folded on July 5, 1915. On May 24, 1915, the Douglas Miners and Las Cruces Farmers had been folded from the league due to financial difficulties, with the remaining four teams continuing league play. At a league meeting held in El Paso, on July 5, 1915, the Rio Grande Association was folded due to continuing financial losses.

The El Paso Mackmen ended their Rio Grande Association season with a record of 36–22, placing second in the final standings. With John McCloskey as manager, the Mackmen finished 1.5 games behind the first place Phoenix Senators in the standings. The Senators were credited with winning the first–half of the split–schedule season and the Mackmen winning the second–half. George Duddy of El Paso led the league in hitting, with a .404 average. Teammate Grover White won 14 games to lead the league.

After the Mackmen, El Paso was without minor league baseball until the 1930 El Paso Texans began play as members of the Arizona State League.

== The ballpark ==
The El Paso Mackmen hosted 1915 home minor league games at Rio Grande Park. The ballpark was constructed in the early 1900s. Today, the site is located across from the KDBC-TV studio. KDBC is located at 200 South Alto Mesa Drive.

In a game at Rio Grande Park on June 20, 1915, Byrd Lynn, a catcher for the Phoenix Senators threw his bat at the umpire. In the seventh inning of the game, after a strike call, Lynn threw the bat, which bat struck umpire Henry Kane, breaking his toe. Lynn was escorted from the field by El Paso police, arrested, taken to the police station and charged with assault. Lynn was suspended indefinitely by the league. "We can't have rowdy ball in this league," said league president Hughes in his suspension of Lynn. Hughes had been in attendance at the game.

== Year–by–year record ==
Year	Record	Finish	Manager	Notes
1915	36–22	2nd	John McCloskey	League folded July 5

== Notable alumni ==
- Jack Bliss (1915)
- Stan Gray (1915)
- Rudy Kallio (1915)
- Joe Mathes (1915)
- John McCloskey (1915, MGR)
- Stoney McGlynn (1915)
- John Perrine (1915)

=== See also ===
El Paso Mackmen players
