= Douglas Miners =

- 1915; Douglas, Arizona

Minor league affiliations
- Class: Class D (1915)
- League: Rio Grande Association (1915)

Major league affiliations
- Team: None

Minor league titles
- League titles (0): None

Team data
- Name: Douglas Miners (1915)
- Ballpark: 10th Street Park (1915)

The Douglas Miners were a short lived minor league baseball team based in Douglas, Arizona. The Douglas Miners played briefly in the 1915 season as charter members of the Class D level Rio Grande Association, before folding during the season.

The Miners played home minor league games at 10th Street Park in Douglas.

== History ==
The 1915 Douglas Miners team was formed and became charter members of the six–team Class D level Rio Grande Association to begin the season. The league started the season with the Albuquerque Dukes, El Paso Mackmen, Las Cruces Farmers, Phoenix Senators and Tucson Old Pueblos joining Douglas as charter member franchises.

After beginning league play on April 27, 1915, the Douglas Miners folded on May 24, 1915. The Douglas and Las Cruces Farmers teams were both dropped from the league on May 24, 1915, due to financial difficulties. Douglas had compiled a record of 5–13 when the franchise folded. The Las Cruces Farmers and 5–14. The two teams were at the botton of the league standings at the time they were both folded.

Douglas compiled their 5–13 record while playing their partial season under the direction of manager Bill Quigley.

The Rio Grande Association continued play with four teams, but the league itself folded before the end of the 1915 season. The Rio Grande Association permanently folded on July 5, 1915, with the Phoenix Senators team in first place.

ADouglas, Arizona was without a minor league baseball franchise until 1948. Douglas partnered with neighboring Bisbee, Arizona to form the Bisbee-Douglas Miners of the 1948 Arizona-Texas League.

== The ballpark ==
The Douglas Miners played 1915 minor league home games at 10th Street Park. Today, the park is still in use as a public park, located at 700 10th Street in Douglas, Arizona.

== Year–by–year record ==
Year	Record	Finish	Manager	Playoffs/Notes
1915	5–13	NA	Bill Quigley	Team folded May 24

== Notable alumni ==
- Bill McGilvray (1915)
- Douglas Miners players
