= Las Cruces Farmers =

- 1915; Las Cruces, New Mexico

Minor league affiliations
- Class: Class D (1915)
- League: Rio Grande Association (1915)

Major league affiliations
- Team: None

Minor league titles
- League titles (0): None

Team data
- Name: Las Cruces Farmers (1912)
- Ballpark: Unknown (1915)

The Las Cruces Farmers were a short–lived minor league baseball team based in Las Cruces, New Mexico. The Farmers began in the 1915 season as members of the Class D level Rio Grande Association, before the franchise permanently folded early in the season after compiling a 5–14 record.

== History ==
The 1915 Las Cruces Farmers became charter members of the six–team Class D level Rio Grande Association. The league started the season with the Albuquerque Dukes, Douglas Miners, El Paso Mackmen, Phoenix Senators and Tucson Old Pueblos joining Las Cruces as charter member franchises.

After beginning league play on April 27, 1915, the Farmers folded on May 24, 1915. The Douglas Miners and Las Cruces teams were both dropped from the league on May 24, 1915, due to financial difficulties. The teams' records were 5–13 and 5–14 respectively. Las Cruces compiled their 5–14 record while playing under manager Bill Hurley.

The league continued play with four teams but folded before the end of the 1915 season. The Rio Grande Association permanently folded on July 5, 1915, with the Phoenix Senators in first place.

Las Cruces, New Mexico was without a minor league baseball franchise for nearly a century, until the 2011 Las Cruces Vaqueros began play as members of the Pecos League.

== The ballpark ==
The name and location of the Las Cruces Farmers' home 1915 minor league ballpark are not known.

== Year–by–year record ==
Year	Record	Finish	Manager	Playoffs/Notes
1915	5–14	NA	Bill Hurley	Team folded May 24

== Notable alumni ==
- Rudy Kallio (1915)
- Stoney McGlynn (1915)
- Las Cruces Farmers players
