= Rendezvous Park =

Former baseball stadium in Mesa, Arizona

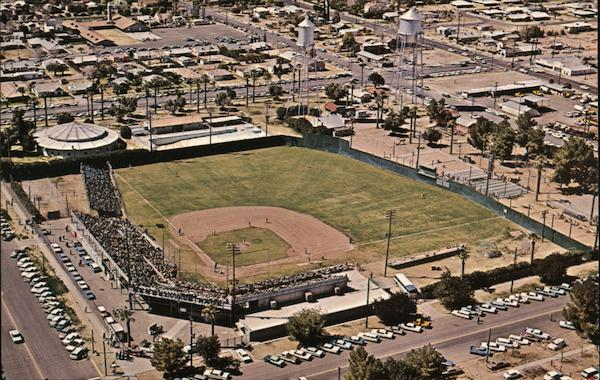
- Rendezvous Park c. 1958
- Interactive map of Rendezvous Park
- Location: Mesa, Arizona, U.S.
- Coordinates: 33°25′11″N 111°49′46″W
- Owner: City of Mesa
- Capacity: 3,000 (permanent)
- Surface: Natural grass
- Scoreboard: Manual

Construction
- Built: 1920
- Opened: 1920
- Expanded: 1952
- Closed: 1976
- Demolished: 1976

Tenants
- Mesa Jewels (ASL) (1929); Mesa Orphans (A-TL) (1947); Oakland Oaks (PCL)* (1950); Chicago Cubs (MLB)* (1952–1965); Oakland Athletics (MLB)* (1969–1976)

Rendezvous Park was a baseball stadium on the grounds of a city park by the same name in Mesa, Arizona. It most notably served as a Major League Baseball spring training ballpark used by the Chicago Cubs from 1952 to 1965 and by the Oakland Athletics from 1969 to 1976.

The stadium was closed in 1976 when it was replaced by the construction of the original Hohokam Stadium a mile to the north.

The stadium site and surrounding park were subsequently redeveloped, with part becoming the site of the Mesa Convention and Conference Center.

== History ==
=== Early history ===
==== City park ====
The park which contained the stadium was first created circa 1895 and was known as Depot Park, in reference to the nearby railway station. Following the closure and relocation of the railway station the park came to be known as Drew's Park.

As early as 1912, Drew's Park came to be known as a popular spot to play baseball as detailed by newspaper articles at the time.

By the early 1920s the park had been renamed again, this time to Rendezvous Park.

==== Stadium construction ====
In 1920, the first official community ball field was constructed at the park near the corner of 2nd Street and Sirrine Avenue, assuming the same name as the park that surrounded it.

In its early years the stadium consisted of a small stand of bleachers behind home plate and along the first base line and had no fence, instead being lined with trees.

=== Minor-league baseball ===
==== Mesa Jewels (1929) ====
The ball field hosted its first team in 1929: the minor-league Class D Mesa Jewels of the Arizona State League. The team would last only a single year before folding, and was replaced by the El Paso Texans.

==== Mesa Orphans (1947) ====
The field would remain without a permanent tenant until minor-league baseball returned again in 1947 with the Class C Mesa Orphans of the Arizona-Texas League, who served as a replacement for the folded Juarez Indios. As before, the team lasted only a single season - the team returned to Juarez following the resolution of a stadium dispute that had caused their departure a year earlier.

=== College baseball ===
==== Arizona State Sun Devils (pre-1959, 1969-1973; part-time) ====
The stadium also served as the home field for the Arizona State Sun Devils college baseball team on occasion, who lacked a home field prior to the construction of an on-campus ball field in 1959. Additionally Arizona State hosted NCAA Regionals at Rendezvous Park in 1969, 1972 and 1973.

=== Spring training ===
==== Oakland Oaks (1950) ====
The first team to host spring training at Rendezvous Park were the minor league Oakland Oaks of the Pacific Coast League in 1950. Though they only played for one season, they served as a proof of concept for groups seeking to bring Major League spring training to the city.

==== Chicago Cubs (1952–1965) ====
As early as 1942 the Chicago Cubs began exploring Mesa as an option for hosting their spring training, sending representatives to meet with city officials and evaluate the city's lodging and ballpark. It wasn't until 1952, however, that the Cubs decided to move their spring training to Mesa from their longtime 'Wrigley Field' site in Avalon, California on Catalina Island. The decision was reached after considerable lobbying from local rancher Dwight Patterson, who managed to convince Cubs owner Philip K. Wrigley that Mesa was better suited for hosting baseball than isolated and fickle-weathered Avalon.

===== 1952 expansion =====
At this time Rendezvous Park - which seated 3,000 - was expanded to meet the needs of the major league team. Bleachers were rented to increased to temporarily increase the capacity, and 500 wooden seats were brought in from Los Angeles' Wrigley Field to serve as box seats. Additionally, Wrigley insisted that a dormitory house be built for the players on the stadium premises. To shoulder the $120,000 price tag for the dorm construction, the city of Mesa agreed to put forth $30,000, Wrigley put forth $40,000 and a special committee of the Mesa Chamber of Commerce known as the "Hohokams" put forth $50,000.

Despite the improvements, the amenities at Rendezvous Park were still less than ideal; the stadium had a small, spartan announcers booth, a manual scoreboard in right field and clubhouses that were cramped and too small to fit the players' luggage inside. Even with the subpar facilities, local excitement was high at the time for the arrival of the Cubs. Significant media presence was on hand to witness the team's arrival at the park.

The Cubs remained at Rendezvous for 14 seasons, playing frequent host to spring training games against the Baltimore Orioles, Cleveland Indians, New York/San Francisco Giants and crosstown-rival Chicago White Sox. Having expressed concerns over tickets sales during the course of the spring training session, the Cubs abruptly left Rendezvous Park in 1965 for Blair Field in Long Beach, California.

==== Oakland Athletics (1969–1976) ====
The stadium then lacked a permanent tenant until 1969, when the Oakland Athletics decided to relocate their spring training to Rendezvous from McKechnie Field in Bradenton, Florida.

Despite the Athletics successes during their time training there - such as winning 3 straight World Series pennants from 1972 to 1974 - and the fact that Arizona State great Reggie Jackson starred on the team, the Athletics were not immensely popular at Rendezvous Park. It was speculated that the Athletics did not do as well as the Cubs because they did not have any ties or support among the many Midwesterners who called Mesa their winter home. Regardless, the Athletics remained at Rendezvous Park through the remainder of its existence.

=== Replacement and redevelopment ===
==== Decline and replacement ====
Along with the significant decline in attendance, it was clear by the mid-1970s that the stadium - which had been inadequate at the outset 20 years earlier - was now severely outdated. The need for a new facilities would eventually prompt Mesa Mayor Eldon Cooley to purchase a site around a mile away from Rendezvous - near Center Street and Brown Road - with a new stadium in mind. This would eventually become the location of the original Hohokam Stadium, which would be completed in 1976.

==== Redevelopment ====
The construction of Hohokam Stadium rendered Rendezvous Park largely irrelevant, and the stadium was quickly deemed to be unnecessary. The city saw the centrally located lot as prime real estate for development, and Rendezvous Park was demolished in 1976. Following the demolition of the stadium, the remaining park subsequently began to disappear as well. The Mesa Convention Center and Amphitheater opened on the site in 1978, followed by a new library in 1981 and a Marriott Hotel in 1984.
