= Rio Grande Association =

1915 minor baseball league in the US

- Classification: Class D (1915)
- Sport: Minor League Baseball
- Founder: John McCloskey
- First season: 1915
- Folded: July 5, 1915
- President: John McCloskey (1915); E.P. Hughes (1915)
- No. of teams: 6
- Country: United States
- Most titles: 1 Phoenix Senators (1915)
- Related competitions: Arizona State League

The Rio Grande Association was a Class D minor baseball league that lasted for less than one season, 1915.

== History ==
The league initially consisted of six teams based in Texas, Arizona and New Mexico: the Albuquerque Dukes, Douglas Miners, El Paso Mackmen, Las Cruces Farmers, Phoenix Senators and Tucson Old Pueblos. By May 24, the Miners and Farmers had disbanded and on July 6, the league disbanded. The league was founded by John McCloskey, who also founded the Texas League.

Each team that appeared in the Rio Grande Association was the first professional baseball team to come out of their respective cities, often predating their successors by many years. For example, after its appearance in the Association, Phoenix and Tucson did not again have a professional team until 1928; El Paso until 1930; Albuquerque until 1932; Douglas until 1948 and Las Cruces until 2010.

The league officially started after a meeting held at the Hotel Sheldon, at El Paso, Texas, February 18, 1915.

On May 4 the league was officially accepted into the National Association of Professional Baseball Leagues. Tucson hosted Opening day April 26, Tucson defeated Phoenix 10-2.

Nearly a month into the season, May 24, the Douglas and Las Cruces teams were dropped from the league due to financial difficulties. The teams' records were 5-13 and 5-14 respectively.

At a league meeting held at El Paso, July 5, it was decided to close the league because of sustaining losses.

The league featured multiple notable players and managers, including those who would attain major league experience and those who had major league experience. They include Kitty Brashear, Frank Huelsman (who led the league with ten home runs), Rudy Kallio, Stoney McGlynn and Herb Hall.

== Cities Represented ==
- Albuquerque, NM: Albuquerque Dukes 1915
- Douglas, AZ: Douglas Miners 1915
- El Paso, TX: El Paso Mackmen 1915
- Las Cruces, NM: Las Cruces Farmers 1915
- Phoenix, AZ: Phoenix Senators 1915
- Tucson, AZ: Tucson Old Pueblos 1915

== 1915 Rio Grande Association ==
| Team standings | W | L | PCT | GB | Managers |
|---|---|---|---|---|---|
| Phoenix Senators | 38 | 21 | .644 | -- | Herbert Hester |
| El Paso Mackmen | 36 | 22 | .621 | 1.5 | John McCloskey |
| Albuquerque Dukes | 32 | 25 | .561 | 5.0 | George Reed |
| Tucson Old Pueblos | 19 | 40 | .322 | 19.0 | Kitty Brashear / Spots MacMurdo |
| Douglas Miners | 5 | 13 | .278 | NA | William Quigley |
| Las Cruces Farmers | 5 | 14 | .263 | NA | William Hurley |

Douglas and Las Cruces disbanded May 24.
The league disbanded July 6.

Player statistics
| Player | Team | Stat | Tot | Player | Team | Stat | Tot |
|---|---|---|---|---|---|---|---|
| George Duddy | El Paso | BA | .404 | Herb Hall | Phoenix | W | 14 |
| John Stadille | Tucson | Runs | 61 | Grover Knight | El Paso | W | 14 |
| George Duddy | El Paso | Hits | 97 | Herb Hall | Phoenix | SO | 99 |
| Frank Huelsman | Albuquerque | HR | 10 | Sam Beer | Las Cruces/El Paso | SO | 99 |
| | | | | Grover Knight | El Paso | Pct | .875; 14-2 |
