= Arizona–Mexico League =

Former Minor League Baseball league

Arizona-Mexico League
- Sport: Minor League baseball, Class C
- Founded: 1955
- Folded: 1958
- No. of teams: 4/6/8
- Countries: Mexico; United States of America
- Most titles: Cananea Mineros (2)
- Website: Official website

The Arizona–Mexico League was a Minor League Baseball league in the southwestern U.S. and northwestern Mexico, that operated as an affiliated Class C league that existed from 1955–58, and then again in 2003 as an independent baseball league. Currently, the Arizona–Mexico League has formed as a legal entity as an independent baseball league that is scheduling to begin play in the future. The league office is in operation, with the goal of beginning play in previous league cities. An exact time to start a new season is unknown at this time.

== History ==
The Arizona–Mexico League was the successor league of the Arizona-Texas League and Arizona State League. The Arizona–Texas League existed from 1930–32, 1937–41, 1947–50 and 1952-54. From 1928 to 1930, it was known as the Arizona State League.

On February 12, 1955, a league meeting at the Tucson league office was held, with President Tim Cusick presiding. The league board consisting of seven members were present. The El Paso and Juarez clubs had been released by the eight-team league during the 1954 season, release effective November 1955, and Globe-Miami entered the league in the off-season. With El Paso, the lone Texas franchise no longer in the league, on this date, the league voted to officially change the league name from Arizona-Texas League to Arizona-Mexico League.

League brass were scrambling in early 1955, trying to recruit an eighth team. Not knowing how many teams would be in the league on opening day, league president Tim Cusick drafted a two-part league schedule, a schedule for a seven-team league and one for an eight-team league. Just before the start of the 1955 season Yuma was accepted into the league. Eventual baseball heavyweight promoter Dick King got word that a team operator was needed in Yuma and he quickly arrived to begin the process of putting a team together.

Three of the eight league teams had affiliation with Major League Baseball. Mexicali had a working agreement with St Louis, Phoenix with Baltimore and the recently joined Globe-Miami team signed with Philadelphia.

The 1956 season had one team membership move and that was the Globe-Miami membership relocating to Tijuana. Also, the league trimmed the number of games from 139 in 1955, to a less aggressive 120 in 1956. Yuma found affiliation with the Cincinnati Reds along with the Douglas Copper Kings becoming affiliated with the Pittsburgh Pirates. Cananea won the first half pennant and Yuma the second half in the split season.

1957 brought a lot of business action. In a January 6, 1957 league meeting held in Nogales, Sonora, Chuck Hollinger of Tucson was elected president of the Arizona–Mexico League and Oliver Talimini of Phoenix, vice president in a general business meeting of league officials. Hollinger replaced E. T. (Tim) Cusick who resigned the previous year. It was voted that there would be no split season in 1957 and no playoff series. The members also adopted a 140-game playing schedule which included no doubleheader games although games rescheduled multiple times because of bad weather could have resulted in a doubleheader. A player pool, based on attendance, was also voted in with the top four finishers splitting the profits. The veteran limit of five was retained for this season.

Las Vegas was voted into the league in a league meeting held in Phoenix on February 3, replacing Tijuana which folded the previous season. At the close of the meeting the league had eight teams for the upcoming season. In other actions at the meeting, the league voted to abolish the job of executive secretary and to raise the salary of League President Charles Hollinger of Tucson from $2,400 to $3,200 a year. Hollinger, who was the former league executive secretary, will combine duties of the secretary with his post as league President. He also was selected to handle the job of league statistician, held for several years by William J. Weiss of San Mateo, Calif.

In mid-March, from the league office in Tucson it became clear only six weeks from opening day that the league will "open and finish the 1957 season with six teams", according to President Chuck Hollinger. Douglas, Las Vegas, Tucson, Phoenix and the two Mexican entries, Mexicali and Cananea. The league lineup is two short of last season, which included Yuma, Tijuana and Nogales. Nogales and Tijuana had financial difficulties and Yuma had problems in securing the municipal ball park after leaving a $3,000 debt after the previous season. The three teams dropping from the league along with the Las Vegas addition, the league sat at six teams by the start of the season. Hollinger also said the league will open April 26, and have a late closing date of September 15. The president said the schedule will have teams playing in each city five times during the summer with three games as the maximum series. No doubleheaders are included in the schedule, but may be played if there are multiple rain-outs during the season. The number of working agreements decreased to two teams, Phoenix with the Baltimore Orioles and Douglas with the Pittsburgh Pirates. With the Yuma and Mexicali departure from the league, so did two affiliations.

In an early January 1958 league meeting held at Nogales, Sonora, the league held discussions of what the best interest of the league would be concerning keeping more rookies on team rosters in order to receive more Major League help. Four teams attended the meeting along with several new cities attending whom expressed interest in joining the '58 season. Also, the league voted to retain Charles Hollinger as president and elected the Douglas club president, Curtis Page, as Arizona–Mexico League vice-president.

A league meeting was called at the Tucson league headquarters on March 2, and the league's current four teams, Tucson, Douglas, Mexicali, and a combined Cananea-Nogales team voted not to continue unless two more teams could be found to enter the league. The league postponed to the next league meeting that was held in Douglas, Arizona March 30. The Central Mexican League disbanded over the off-season and Juarez attended the meeting. The league voted unanimously to accept the Juarez team and asked them to help with communications with Chihuahua about bringing their team to be the sixth much needed team into the league for 1958.

At the April 13th special called league meeting held in El Paso, Texas, Chihuahua team officials traveled to attend in order to gain the league vote for their team to enter the league as the 6th and final team. The league board voted to accept Chihuahua, they also voted to have a 120-game season, begin play May 1 and close Sept. 7. Chihuahua would play some of it home games at Las Delicias in the state of Chihuahua and Douglas planned to schedule some of its home games at Agua Prieta in Sonera, Mex.

Two weeks before the start of the season, it was announced that the Nogales-Cananea franchise will operate solely from Nogales that year. League president Chuck Hollinger made the announcement after talking by telephone to Cananea officials who had conferred earlier in the day with Carlos de la Isla of Nogales. For the past several seasons Cananea had been leading the league in attendance but the previous year, due to the drop in copper prices in the mining city, the club had trouble making ends meet. At the same time the shortest playing schedule since the reactivation of the league in 1947 was released by Hollinger.

In 1958 the Douglas Copper Kings did something no other professional team has done in minor league baseball history. All nine players of the starting line-up hit a home run in the same game at Chihuahua. See the external link below.

In late 1958, Phoenix was granted a Class AAA Pacific Coast League membership as it received the AAA San Francisco Seals club membership as the New York Giants moved to San Francisco.

With the Arizona–Mexico League already at six-teams, losing Phoenix signaled the end of the Class C Arizona–Mexico League; its final champion in 1958 was the Douglas Copper Kings, an affiliate of the Pittsburgh Pirates.

During the four seasons more than 1,700,000 fans went through the gates. The Cananea Mineros were the only team to win more than one league title, taking back to back championships in 1955 and 1956. They drew 347,247 fans those two years.

George Trautman, head of the minor leagues informed league team members, via wire that effective March 23, 1959, the Arizona–Mexico League will fold. Don Jameson, owner of the Tucson Cowboys, received a night wire and $2,100 in deposits which was that years league dues.

== 2003 league reformed ==
On December 21, 2002, a meeting was held by representatives of the Bisbee-Douglas Copper Kings, Cananea Mineros, Juarez Halcones and Nogales Charros. This meeting resulted in the official formation of the Arizona–Mexico League (AZMXL), a league that would fill a void for the rookie year to third year professional player. Team directors were John Guy/Bisbee-Douglas; Abe Erdman/Cananea; Alicia Barboza/Juarez; and Shane Folsom/Nogales.

The 2003 season marked the beginning as an Independent league and each team was scheduled to play 72 games. Opening night was May 30, 2003.

A month prior to the start of the season the Juarez team moved to Tecate, Baja California and became the Tecate Cerveceros. The Juarez home stadium, Estadio Carta Blanca, was to undergo renovations, as agreed between the team and the stadium owner. The renovations had not begun as of 30 days before the beginning of the season, and the league voted to move the team to the next viable city.

The Bisbee-Douglas team notified the league office the morning of June 17, which was an off-day for each team, and requested an emergency meeting held at the Bisbee-Douglas team office. The meeting was held late-afternoon and directors of each team were present. Each team explained the difficulty of operations since the league inception. Bisbee-Douglas explained they had overdrawn at the bank, the primary Nogales shareholder told the meeting they did not want to continue. The directors of the Cananea and Tecate teams said they would try to continue their season. The president of the league, Bob Lipp, called for a vote. Each team agreed to suspend operations and it was a 4-0 vote, each team in favor to stop the season.

The season lasted nearly three weeks and each team played 16 games.

The league's highest profile player was former MLB outfielder Chuck Carr who signed with Bisbee-Douglas as a player-coach on May 7.

== Cities represented ==
- Bisbee, Arizona & Douglas, Arizona: Bisbee-Douglas Copper Kings (1955); Douglas Copper Kings (1956–1958); Bisbee-Douglas Copper Kings (2003)
- Cananea, Sonora, Mexico: Cananea Mineros (1955–1957, 2003)
- Chihuahua, Chihuahua, Mexico: Chihuahua Dorados (1958)
- Ciudad Juarez, Chihuahua, Mexico: Juarez Indios (1958)
- Globe, AZ & Miami, Arizona: Globe-Miami Miners (1955)
- Las Vegas, Nevada: Las Vegas Wranglers (1957)
- Mexicali, Baja California, Mexico: Mexicali Eagles (or Mexicali Aguilas) (1955–1958)
- Nogales, Sonora, Mexico: Nogales Yaquis (1955); Nogales Diablos Rojos (1956); Nogales Mineros (1958); Nogales Charros (2003)
- Phoenix, Arizona: Phoenix Stars (1955–1957)
- Tecate, Baja California, Mexico: Tecate Cerveceros (2003)
- Tijuana, Baja California, Mexico: Tijuana Potros (1956)
- Tucson, Arizona: Tucson Cowboys (1955–1958)
- Yuma, Arizona: Yuma Sun Sox (1955–1956)

== Arizona–Mexico League standings ==
=== 1955 to 1958 ===
1955 Arizona–Mexico League
schedule
President: Tim Cusick

Team standings	W	L	PCT	GB	Attend	Managers
Cananea Mineros	86	53	.619	--	213,074	Memo Garibay
Yuma Sun Sox	83	57	.593	3½	79,083	Whitey Wietelmann
Phoenix Stars	80	59	.576	6	74,185	Jerry Gardner
Mexicali Eagles	78	62	.557	8½	59,787	Art Lilly
Tucson Cowboys	66	74	.471	20½	70,973	Don Jameson
Bisbee-Douglas Copper Kings	63	77	.450	23½	45,567	Everett Robinson
Globe-Miami Miners	51	87	.370	34½	33,886	Del Ballinger / Corky Reddell; Vern Campbell
Nogales Yaquis	49	87	.360	35½	74,145	Virgilio Arteaga / Eddie Aros / Guillermo Nunez / Carlos Galina

No playoffs held.

Player statistics
Player	Team	Stat	Tot	Player	Team	Stat	Tot
Moises Camacho	Mexicali	BA	.363	Charlie Peete	Tucson	W	24
Ellis Burton	Phoenix	Runs	140	Olaf Nelson	Phoenix	W	24
Rubén Amaro	Mexicali	Runs	140	Charlie Peete	Tucson	SO	322
Humberto Barbon	Nogales/Yuma	Hits	202	Fernando Ramirez	Mexicali	ERA	2.95
Claudio Solano	Cananea	RBI	164	Humberto Barbon	Nogales/Yuma	HR	38

1956 Arizona–Mexico League
President: Tim Cusick

Team standings	W	L	PCT	GB	Attend	Managers
Cananea Mineros	75	56	.573	-	134,173	Memo Garibay
Douglas Copper Kings	73	58	.557	2	42,059	Jerry Gardner
Nogales Diablos Rojos	71	59	.546	3½	60,000	Carlos Galina
Phoenix Stars	70	59	.543	4	60,017	Bill Capps
Yuma Sun Sox	66	65	.504	9	35,076	Whitey Wietelmann / Bill Harris
Mexicali Eagles	63	65	.492	10½	74,417	Larry Barton / Artie Wilson
Tucson Cowboys	57	71	.445	16½	40,000	Don Jameson
Tijuana Potros	17	59	.224	NA	30,000	Virgilio Arteaga

Tijuana folded June 28.
Playoffs: Cananea 3 games, Yuma 0.

Player statistics
Player	Team	Stat	Tot	Player	Team	Stat	Tot
Walter Tyler	Yuma	BA	.392	James Johnson	Phoenix	W	19
Claudio Solano	Cananea	Runs	147	Amador Guzman	Nogales	W	19
Walter Tyler	Yuma	Hits	208	George Perez	Cananea	W	19
Claudio Solano	Cananea	RBI	174	John Ivory Smith	Tucson	SO	217
Claudio Solano	Cananea	HR	45	Joe Orrell	Tijuana/Mexicali	ERA	2.70

1957 Arizona–Mexico League
schedule
President: Charles S. Hollinger

Team standings	W	L	PCT	GB	Attend	Managers
Phoenix Stars	89	48	.650	--	70,063	Bob Hooper
Cananea Mineros	76	56	.576	10½	103,571	Claudio Solano / Daniel Rios
Douglas Copper Kings	68	69	.496	21	27,949	Bob Clear
Las Vegas Wranglers	62	74	.456	26½	35,804	Red Marion
Tucson Cowboys	62	77	.446	28	28,157	Don Jameson / Ernie Choukalos
Mexicali Eagles	51	84	.378	37	54,591	Artie Wilson / Manuel Magallon

Mexicali folded September 6 and forfeited remaining 10 games.
No playoffs held.

Player statistics
Player	Team	Stat	Tot	Player	Team	Stat	Tot
Claudio Solano	Cananea	BA	.402	Candido Andrade	Tucson	W	20
Barry Shetrone	Phoenix	Runs	151	Bob Clear	Douglas	W	20
Barry Shetrone	Phoenix	Hits	199	Candido Andrade	Tucson	SO	260
Claudio Solano	Cananea	RBI	159	Donald Bruns	Phoenix	ERA	3.59
Cananea	HR	41					

1958 Arizona–Mexico League
schedule
President: Charles S. Hollinger

Team standings	W	L	PCT	GB	Attend	Managers
Douglas Copper Kings	68	52	.567	--	25,315	Bob Clear
Tucson Cowboys	66	54	.550	2	42,257	Harry Dunlop
Nogales Mineros	59	59	.500	8	48,887	Memo Garibay
Chihuahua Dorados	56	62	.475	11	59,917	Leonel Aldama
Juarez Indios	55	64	.462	12½	59,847	Epitacio Torres / Barney Serrell; Pedro Ramirez
Mexicali Eagles	53	66	.445	14½	55,649	Felipe Hernandez

No playoffs held.

Player statistics
Player	Team	Stat	Tot	Player	Team	Stat	Tot
Jose Medrano	Mexicali	BA	.385	Jose Ibarra	Chihuahua	W	19
Jose Podilla ]	Nogales	Runs	136	Manuel Estrada	Nogales	SO	244
Jose Medrano	Mexicali	Hits	173	Kermit Kowalk	Tucson	ERA	3.04
Jose Echeverria	Chihuahua	RBI	126	Jose Echeverria	Chihuahua	HR	35

=== 2003 League ===
2003 Arizona–Mexico League

Team standings	W	L	PCT	GB	Attend	Managers
Nogales Charros	10	6	.625	--	3,106	Mike Odum
Bisbee-Douglas Copper Kings	9	7	.563	1	8,168	Butch Hammett
Tecate Cerveceroa	9	7	.563	1	3,329	Roberto Heras
Cananea Mineros	4	12	.250	6	5,380	Bill Flynt

== Champions ==
Season	Winner	Runner-up	Results
1955	Cananea Mineros	Yuma Sun Sox	no playoffs
1956	Cananea Mineros	Yuma Sun Sox	3-0 (best-of 5)
1957	Phoenix Stars	Cananea Mineros	no playoffs
1958	Douglas Copper Kings	Tucson Cowboys	no playoffs
2003	none (league disbanded after 16 games)	---	---
