= Southwest International League =

- Classification: Class C
- Sport: Minor league baseball
- First season: 1951
- Folded: 1952
- No. of teams: 12
- Countries: United States; Mexico

The Southwest International League was a minor league baseball league that operated from 1951 through 1952. The league was formed through the merger of the Sunset League and Arizona–Texas League in 1951. The league hosted franchises based in Mexico, Arizona, California, Nevada and Texas.

== History ==
Formed in 1951 by a merger of the Sunset League and Arizona-Texas League, the Southwest International League played two seasons as a Class C level league. In 1951, the Tijuana players went on strike over not being paid on a regular basis. In 1952, the league fielded an all-black team, which was originally supposed to play half of its games in the US and half in Mexico, but eventually settled in Porterville, California as the Porterville Comets. Only 4 of the 6 entries survived the complete 1952 season, before the league permanently folded.

== Cities represented ==
- Bisbee, AZ and Douglas, AZ: Bisbee-Douglas Copper Kings 1951
- Ciudad Juarez, MEX: Juarez Indios 1951
- El Centro, CA: El Centro Imperials 1951
- El Paso, TX: El Paso Texans 1951
- Las Vegas, NV: Las Vegas Wranglers 1951–1952
- Mexicali, MEX: Mexicali Eagles 1951–1952
- Phoenix, AZ: Phoenix Senators 1951
- Porterville, CA: Porterville Comets 1952
- Tijuana, MEX: Tijuana Potros 1951–1952
- Tucson, AZ: Tucson Cowboys 1951
- Yuma, AZ: Yuma Panthers 1951–1952

== Standings & statistics ==
1951 Southwest International League
schedule
President: Les Powers

Team standings	W	L	PCT	GB	Attend	Managers
El Paso Texans	88	56	.611	–	104,061	Art Lilly
Juarez Indios	87	57	.604	1.0	68,000	Victor Manuel Canajes / Red Kress
Phoenix Senators	83	61	.576	5.0	65,320	Wayne Tucker
Mexicali Eagles	81	63	.563	7.0	88,426	Virgilio Arteaga / Dee Moore
Las Vegas Wranglers	72	71	.503	15.5	48,000	Newt Kimball
Tucson Cowboys	68	75	.476	19.5	62,841	Ken Meyers / Bud Dawson
Tijuana Potros	65	79	.451	23.0	55,000	Luis Montes de Oca / Enrique Fernandez
Bisbee-Douglas Copper Kings	64	80	.444	24.0	57,786	Syd Cohen
El Centro Imperials	59	85	.410	29.0	23,847	Red Kress / Bud Beringhele
Yuma Panthers	52	92	.361	36.0	50,557	Ray Viers / Don Jameson

Playoff: Mexicali 4 games, Phoenix 1.

Player statistics
Player	Team	Stat	Tot	Player	Team	Stat	Tot
Raymon Vargas	Juarez/El Paso	BA	.377	Vince Gonzales	Juarez	W	32
Eduardo Cruz	Juarez	Runs	135	Memo Luna	Tijuana	SO	318
Ramon Vargas	Juarez/El Paso	Hits	229	Memo Luna	Tijuana	ERA	2.52
Ramon Vargas	Juarez/El Paso	RBI	149	Manuel Echeverria	Mexicali	PCT	.824 14–3
Herman Lewis	Phoenix	HR	23	Tony Ponce	Phoenix	CG	38

1952 Southwest International League
President: Harry Ledell

Team standings	W	L	PCT	GB	Attend	Managers
Tijuana Potros	80	56	.588	–	45,000	Fernando Paredes
Mexicali Eagles	74	57	.565	3.5	35,239	Dolf Luque / Virgilio Arteaga
Las Vegas Wranglers	70	66	.515	10.0	53,200	William DeCarlo
Yuma Panthers	62	68	.477	15.0	52,280	Lou Bekeza
Porterville Comets	39	59	.398	NA	32,000	Chet Brewer
El Centro Imps	28	47	.373	NA	12,000	Bud Beringhele / Frank Gabler / Henry Savin

Porterville Franchise started the season as Riverside–Ensenda, became Riverside–Porterville, moved to Porterville April 25, then disbanded August 1.; El Centro disbanded July 13.

Player statistics
Player	Team	Stat	Tot	Player	Team	Stat	Tot
Pete Hughes	Tijuana	BA	.366	Joe Orrell	Tijuana	W	21
Walter Tyler	Porter/Yuma	BA	.366	Silverio Rodriguez	Mexicali	SO	209
Joe Clardy	Las Vegas	Runs	142	Joe Orrell	Tijuana	ERA	2.01
Joe Clardy	Las Vegas	RBI	202	Joe Orrell	Tijuana	Pct	.875; 21–3
Pete Hughes	Tijuana	RBI	131				
Pete Hughes	Tijuana	HR	28				
Refugio Bernal	Mexicali	HR	28				
Pete Hughes	Tijuana	BB	180				
