= Indios de Ciudad Juárez (baseball) =

Mexican baseball team

- Logo

Information
- League: Chihuahua State Baseball League (2021–present)
- Location: Ciudad Juárez, Chihuahua
- Ballpark: Estadio Juárez Vive
- Founded: 1946
- League championships: 1 (1982)
- Former league: Mexican League (1973–1984)
- Colors: Red, black and white
- Website: https://indiosjuarez.com/

The Indios de Ciudad Juárez are a Mexican semiprofessional baseball club based in Ciudad Juárez, Chihuahua that plays in the Chihuahua State Baseball League. The Indios played as a professional team in several leagues during 23 seasons spanning 1946–1984, most notably in the Mexican League from 1973 to 1984. The team has also been known as the Ciudad Juárez Indios or the Juarez Indios. The team's name was chosen to honor statesman Benito Juárez, who described himself as the son of Indians

== History ==
=== Early history ===
Organized Mexican baseball started in 1937, when a league featuring teams from the cities of México, Tampico and Veracruz played a modest 25 game schedule. Gradually increasing the number of games, the independent Mexican baseball circuit was playing nearly a 100-game schedule by the end of World War II.

At the beginning, teams in the Mexican League, which played in the winter, included on their rosters baseball stars of the Negro National League. Prohibited from playing in Organized Baseball, the African-Americans ballplayers were welcomed and excelled in Mexico. For instance, in 1938 Martín Dihigo posted an 18-2 record and a 0.90 earned run average as a pitcher, while winning the batting title with a solid .387 average. Two years later, Cool Papa Bell won the Triple Crown, while batting .437 with 12 home runs and 79 runs batted in.

=== 1946 ===
In 1946, the Mexican National League was founded and joined the ranks of Organized Baseball as a Class B circuit. The league included six franchises that represented Mexico City (Aztecas), Chihuahua (Dorados), El Paso (Tejanos), Saltillo (Peroneros), Torreón–Gómez Palacio (Laguneros), and Ciudad Juárez (Indios). Unfortunately, it was to be a short-lived experiment because of competition from an independent Mexican League. This operation, bankrolled by Mexican entrepreneur Jorge Pasquel, placed franchises in two of the same cities, Mexico City and Torreón, forcing the Class B competition to fold. As a result, the MNL México and Torreón clubs retired in late April and the remaining of the league collapsed on May 27, just when Juárez and Chihuahua were tied in first place with a 23-21 record. After that, the outlaw Mexican League also became a threat to Major League Baseball for the rest of the decade.

=== 1947–1954 ===
In 1947 the Indios de Ciudad Juárez took refuge in the Class C Arizona–Texas League, but suspended operations during the midseason and were replaced by the Mesa Orphans. When the Indios reorganized in 1948, they changed their misfortune and advanced to the postseason three years in a row.

In 1948, Ciudad Juárez finished fourth with a 74-66 record and lost the league finals to the Globe-Miami Browns. They improved to 92-58 in 1949, good for a second place, but did not advance from the first round.

Then, in 1950 they won the regular season with a record of 93-55 and defeated the Phoenix Senators in the best-of-seven Series, four games to two. That season, Ciudad Juárez was managed by Syd Cohen, a former Washington Senators pitcher, better known for giving up Babe Ruth his final home run and final strikeout for the New York Yankees in 1934.

In 1951 the Arizona–Texas League merged with the Sunset League to form the Southwest International League. Ciudad Juárez finished second with an 87-57 record in the 10-team league, but did not advance pass the first round of the playoffs.

The Arizona–Texas League broke off again in 1952, operating through 1954, before changing its name to the Arizona–Mexico League the following season. The Indios were successfully in this three-year span, claiming their second championship title in 1952 with an 84-55 record, and ending 74-65 for a third place in 1953. By the time playoffs were not played. Then, the league expanded from six to eight teams in 1954 and became more competitive, which affected the Indios performance, which ended last with a 55-85 mark, 38 games out first place. The team took a break in 1955.

=== 1956–1958 ===
The Indios found itself on the move again, this time in the short-lived Mexican Center League, a Class C six-team circuit that operated from 1956 to 1957. They finished with a modest record of 48-52 in 1956, enough for a third place, 10½ games out of contention. The team failed again in 1957, ending fourth with a 49-51 mark, 13 games out of first place.

In 1958 Ciudad Juárez became a member of the aforementioned Arizona–Mexico League. The Indios placed fifth of six teams with a record of 55-64, 12½ games out of first place. After that, the team suspended operations for a long time.

=== Mexican League (1973–1984) ===
Ciudad Juárez returned to action after 15 years of absence, as part of the revamped Mexican League from 1973 through 1984. The Mexican League had begun to operate as a Triple A circuit in 1967 and was a very strong organization. By the time the Indians made their debut, the league had 16 teams distributed in four divisions.

Following three disastrous seasons from 1973–1975, the Indios became a seasoned squad after that. The team won the Northwest Division in 1976 but lost in the second round of the playoffs. Then, they advanced to the finals in 1979, losing to the Angeles de Puebla in the maximum seven games.

In 1980, Ciudad Juárez finished second in the supplemental season put on by a few teams after the regular season was stopped by a players strike. Then, the Indios advanced to the postseason in 1981 but lost in the first round. Finally, they clinched the Championship title in 1982 and were runners-up in the 1983 and 1984 seasons, losing to the Piratas de Campeche (4-3) and the Leones de Yucatán (4-2), respectively. The Indios posted a collective record of 819–777 (.513) during their 12 seasons in the league.

In 1985, the franchise moved to Torreón, Coahuila becoming the Algodoneros de Unión Laguna.

== Notable players ==
=== MLB alumni ===
- John Balaz (1978–1979)
- Eddie Bane (1979)
- Ossie Blanco (1976–1977)
- Ossie Chavarria (1973)
- Syd Cohen (1950)
- Lino Donoso (1958)
- Chico García (1949)
- Rafael García (1976–1984)
- Vince Gonzales (1951–1954)
- Roger Hambright (1975–1977)
- Joe Henderson (1978)
- Teddy Higuera (1979–1983)
- Ken Hottman (1975)
- Art James (1981)
- Mike Kekich (1980–1981)
- Kevin Kobel (1982)
- Red Kress (1951)
- Barry Lersch (1976)
- Memo Luna (1949–1950)
- Connie Marrero (1946)
- John Matias (1974–1978)
- Baby Ortiz (1951–1952)
- Mike Paul (1977–1981)
- José Peña (1982)
- Miguel Puente (1975)
- Frank Snook (1976)
- Earl Stephenson (1975)
- René Valdés (1952–1953)
- Sandy Valdespino (1973)
- Héctor Valle (1975–1976)
- Charlie Vinson (1973)
- Walt Williams (1978)
