= Rio Grande Park =

First baseball park in El Paso

Coordinates: 31.8331°N 106.5420°W

Rio Grande Park was the first baseball park constructed and used for baseball in El Paso, Texas. It was finished in the early 1900s and later replaced by Dudley Field in 1924. The ballpark existed across from where the former KDBC-TV studios are today.

The 1915 El Paso Mackmen of the Class D level Rio Grande Association hosted games at Rio Grande Park.
