= René Valdés =

Cuban baseball player (1929–2008)

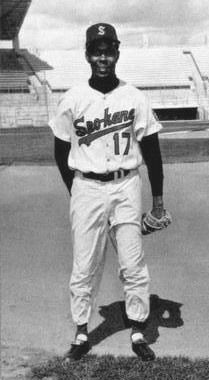
- Pitcher
- Born: Rene Gutierrez Valdes; June 2, 1929; Guanabacoa, Cuba
- Died: March 15, 2008 (aged 78); Miami, Florida, U.S.
- Batted: Right Threw: Right

MLB debut
- April 21, 1957, for the Brooklyn Dodgers

Last MLB appearance
- September 28, 1957, for the Brooklyn Dodgers

MLB statistics
- Record: 1–1
- Earned run average: 5.54
- Strikeouts: 10
- Stats at Baseball Reference

Teams
- Brooklyn Dodgers (1957)

René Valdés (born René Gutiérrez Valdés, (Note: As noted in the April 18 issue of the Los Angeles Sentinel, "Rene was born Gutierrez, but he chose his mother's maiden name for baseball purposes because it's easier to pronounce and spell.") June 2, 1929 – March 15, 2008) was a Cuban-born professional baseball player.

== Early life and career ==
The right-handed pitcher, born in Guanabacoa near Havana on June 2, appeared in five games in Major League Baseball for the Brooklyn Dodgers in 1957 during his 13-year pro career. He stood 6 feet 3 inches (1.91 m) tall and weighed 175 pounds (79 kg).

Valdés was acquired by Brooklyn in 1954 after spending his first two seasons in the minor leagues with the unaffiliated Indios de Ciudad Juárez of the Class C Arizona–Texas League, winning 19 games during each year. Primarily a starting pitcher, he was a prolific winner during his minor league tenure, reaching double digits in victories for ten consecutive seasons (1952–1961). He posted an 18–4 mark in the Class C California League in 1954. Then, two years later, Valdés led the Open-Classification Pacific Coast League in games won, with 22 triumphs.

In 1957, Valdés worked in four early-season games for the Brooklyn Dodgers. In his début April 21 at Ebbets Field, he held the Pittsburgh Pirates without a hit over 32/3 innings pitched in relief of Dodger ace Don Newcombe. Three days later, against the New York Giants, he entered the game in the fifth inning in relief of starter Sandy Koufax and allowed three hits and one earned run in three full innings to get credit for a 4–3 Dodger victory. Two poor outings followed, resulting in Valdés' demotion to the Triple-A Montreal Royals, where he won 11 games and posted a 2.87 earned run average. He was recalled in September and started what would be the Brooklyn Dodgers' penultimate game, on the 28th against the Philadelphia Phillies at Connie Mack Stadium. He did not earn a decision when he exited the game in the fifth inning, even though he held an 8–3 lead at the time. After the Dodgers' season-ending game the next day, the franchise transferred to Los Angeles for the 1958 campaign.

As a major leaguer, Valdés split two decisions; he allowed 13 hits, seven bases on balls and eight earned runs in 13 full innings of work, with ten strikeouts, posting an earned run average of 5.54. He toiled at the Triple-A level in the Dodger organization from 1958 through 1961, then finished his career with three seasons in the Mexican League. He died in Miami, Florida, at age 78 in 2008.
