= Mineros de Cananea =

Mineros de Cananea may also refer to:

- Mineros de Cananea (baseball), Arizona–Mexico League team 1955–1957, 2003
- Mineros de Cananea (basketball), Liga Mexicana de Básquetbol CIBACOPA team 2005-Present
