= Miami Miners =

Minor league baseball team in Arizona

- 1928–1930; Miami, Arizona

Minor league affiliations
- Previous classes: Class D
- League: Arizona State League

Minor league titles
- League titles: 1929

The Miami Miners were a Minor League Baseball team that represented Miami, Arizona in the Arizona State League (ASL) from 1928 to 1930. The team previously played in the ASL as a semi-professional league dating back to at least 1917. The Globe-Miami Browns would succeed them in 1947.

== Notable players ==
- Pete Compton, played six seasons in Major League Baseball (1911–1918)
- Lester Floyd Quinn, threw a no-hitter with Miami in 1927, future politician
