= Everett Robinson =

Bisbee-Douglas Copper Kings
- Born: October 12, 1916; Hobart, Indiana, U.S.
- Died: August 29, 1994 (aged 77)

debut
- 1935

Last appearance
- 1956

Everett Anthony Robinson Jr. (October 12, 1916 – August 29, 1994) was an American minor league baseball first baseman and manager. Born in Hobart, Indiana, he threw and batted left-handed, stood 6 feet 1 inch (1.85 m) tall and weighed 164 pounds (74 kg).

== Career ==
Robinson played for 19 seasons in the minor leagues, from 1935 to 1943, in 1946 and from 1948 to 1956. He hit .276 with 146 home runs, 453 doubles and 120 triples over the course of his career. He also collected 2,123 hits in the 2,140 games in which he played. In 1955, with the Bisbee-Douglas Copper Kings, Robinson hit .355 with 12 home runs and 32 doubles in 414 at-bats.

He managed from 1951 to 1958. He first managed the Grand Rapids Jets in 1951, replacing Jack Knight partway through the season. In 1952 and 1953, he managed the Madisonville Miners, helping them win the league championship in the former season and leading them to the playoffs in the latter. He then managed a new team each year until 1958. In order, they were the Magic Valley Cowboys, Bisbee-Douglas Copper Kings, Midland Indians, Crowley Millers and Waycross Braves.
