= Jimmy Zinn =

American baseball player (1895–1991)

- Pitcher
- Born: January 21, 1895; Benton, Arkansas, U.S.
- Died: February 26, 1991 (aged 96); Memphis, Tennessee, U.S.
- Batted: Left Threw: Right

MLB debut
- September 4, 1919, for the Philadelphia Athletics

Last MLB appearance
- August 25, 1929, for the Cleveland Indians

MLB statistics
- Win–loss record: 13–16
- Earned run average: 4.30
- Strikeouts: 108
- Stats at Baseball Reference

Teams
- Philadelphia Athletics (1919); Pittsburgh Pirates (1920–1922); Cleveland Indians (1929)

James Edward Zinn (January 21, 1895 – February 26, 1991) was an American professional baseball pitcher. He played all or part of four seasons in Major League Baseball (MLB) for the Philadelphia Athletics (1919), Pittsburgh Pirates (1920–22), and Cleveland Indians (1929). In five seasons he had a 13–16 win–loss record, 66 games pitched, 108 strikeouts, and a 4.30 ERA.

After five seasons in the minor leagues, Zinn made his MLB debut on September 4, 1919 with the Philadelphia Athletics. He pitched for them in five games, then was sent to the Pittsburgh Pirates in the offseason. He spent parts of 1920 and 1922 in both the minors and with the Pirates, and spent all of 1921 on the major league roster. Zinn then spent six more years in the minor leagues before pitching in 18 games for the Cleveland Indians in 1929.

Zinn was an above average hitting pitcher in the majors, posting a .283 batting average (34-for-120) with 17 runs, 2 home runs and 15 RBIs. He was used as a pinch hitter 10 times. In 20 games for the 1929 Cleveland Indians, he batted a career high .381 (16-for-42) with 1 home run and 8 RBI.

Zinn was the winning pitcher for the first ever radio broadcast of a major league baseball game on August 5, 1921 by Pittsburgh's KDKA radio between the Pittsburgh Pirates and the Philadelphia Phillies.

In addition to his major league career, Zinn pitched for 25 years in the minor leagues, between 1915 and 1939. Between his stints with the Pirates and Indians, he spent 1923–28 pitching for the Kansas City Blues of the American Association, winning 20 games three times, including a 27-6 season in 1923. After leaving the Indians, he joined the San Francisco Seals of the Pacific Coast League until 1935, winning 20 games twice more. In 1937, he turned to managing, becoming the player-manager of the El Paso Texans in the Arizona–Texas League. He continued to manage on and off in the minors until 1953.

He died in Memphis, Tennessee at the age of 96.
