= Riverside Park (Arizona) =

Former baseball park in Phoenix, Arizona

Coordinates: 33.4218°N 112.0731°W

Riverside Park was a baseball park in Phoenix, Arizona, that fell into disuse after a Phoenix Municipal Stadium was constructed in 1937. It served as the spring training home of the Detroit Tigers in 1929, the first team to hold spring training in Phoenix. The park had been around since at least 1884.

It also served as the home ballpark of the Phoenix Senators, a minor league baseball team.
