= Yuma Panthers =

- 1950–1956; (1950–1952, 1955–1956); Yuma, Arizona

Minor league affiliations
- Previous classes: Class C
- League: Arizona–Mexico League (1955–1956)
- Previous leagues: Southwest International League (1951–1952); Sunset League (1950)

Major league affiliations
- Previous teams: Cincinnati Reds (1956)

Team data
- Previous names: Yuma Sun Sox (1955–1956); Yuma Panthers (1950–1952)

The Yuma Panthers was the initial moniker of the minor league baseball team based in Yuma, Arizona, US from 1950 to 1956. Yuma played as a member of the Class C level Sunset League in 1950, Southwest International League from 1951 to 1952 and Arizona–Mexico League in 1955 and 1956. The Yuma Sun Sox were an affiliate of the Cincinnati Reds in 1956.

== Notable alumni ==
- Frank Gabler
- Ed Mayer
