= Vince Gonzales =

Cuban baseball player

- Pitcher
- Born: September 28, 1925; Quivicán, Cuba
- Died: March 11, 1981 (aged 55); Ciudad del Carmen, Campeche, Mexico
- Batted: Left Threw: Left

MLB debut
- April 13, 1955, for the Washington Senators

Last MLB appearance
- April 13, 1955, for the Washington Senators

MLB statistics
- Win–loss record: 0–0
- Earned run average: 27.00
- Innings pitched: 2
- Stats at Baseball Reference

Teams
- Washington Senators (1955)
Medals
Representing Cuba
Amateur World Series
Gold medal – first place	1939 Havana	Team

Wenceslao Gonzales O'Reilly (September 28, 1925 – March 11, 1981) was a Cuban-born professional baseball player during the 1950s and 1960s. A left-handed pitcher who stood 6 feet 1 inch (1.85 m) tall and weighed 165 pounds (75 kg), Gonzales appeared in one Major League Baseball game in 1955 as a member of the Washington Senators.

Gonzales began playing amateur baseball, and was selected to the Cuba national baseball team at the 1939 Amateur World Series in Havana at just 14 years old; he was also one of the first Afro-Cubans to make the national team. He finished the tournament with a 2–0 record, and also went 3-for-6 at the plate, to bring Cuba its first international championship.

Gonzales entered professional baseball in 1951 as a member of the Ciudad Juárez Indios and in his first season, he led the Class C Southwest International League with 32 victories. He followed that by winning 25 and 22 games for the Indios.

In 1955, Gonzales was a member of the Senators' early season roster and appeared in the second game of the campaign, a road contest against the New York Yankees. Called into the game in the seventh inning with Washington already losing 13–1, he worked the final two frames, allowing six hits, six earned runs and three bases on balls in an eventual 19–1 rout.

Gonzales spent the rest of the season in the Arizona–Mexico League and the Mexican League and the rest of his career pitching in Mexico, appearing in a game as late as in 1969.
