= Dick Cox =

American baseball player (1895–1966)

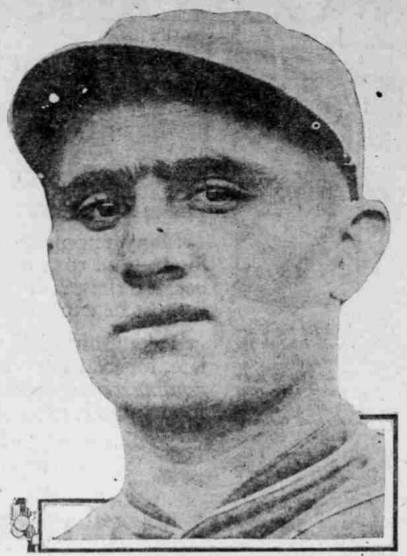
- Outfielder
- Born: September 30, 1895; Pasadena, California, U.S.
- Died: June 1, 1966 (aged 70); Morro Bay, California, U.S.
- Batted: Right Threw: Right

MLB debut
- April 16, 1925, for the Brooklyn Robins

Last MLB appearance
- September 26, 1926, for the Brooklyn Robins

MLB statistics
- Batting average: .314
- Home runs: 8
- Runs batted in: 109
- Stats at Baseball Reference

Teams
- Brooklyn Robins (1925–1926)

Elmer Joseph "Dick" Cox (September 30, 1895 – June 1, 1966) was an American professional baseball player who played outfield for the Brooklyn Robins in 1925 and 1926.

He had a steady bat over his two seasons in the big leagues, batting .314 in 832 at bats, including eight home runs. Cox spent most of his time in right field defensively.

Prior to his playing days, Cox served in World War I.

He managed in the Arizona–Texas League in 1931 and 1932.
