= Lester Floyd Quinn =

Lester Quinn

Lester Floyd "Letch" Quinn
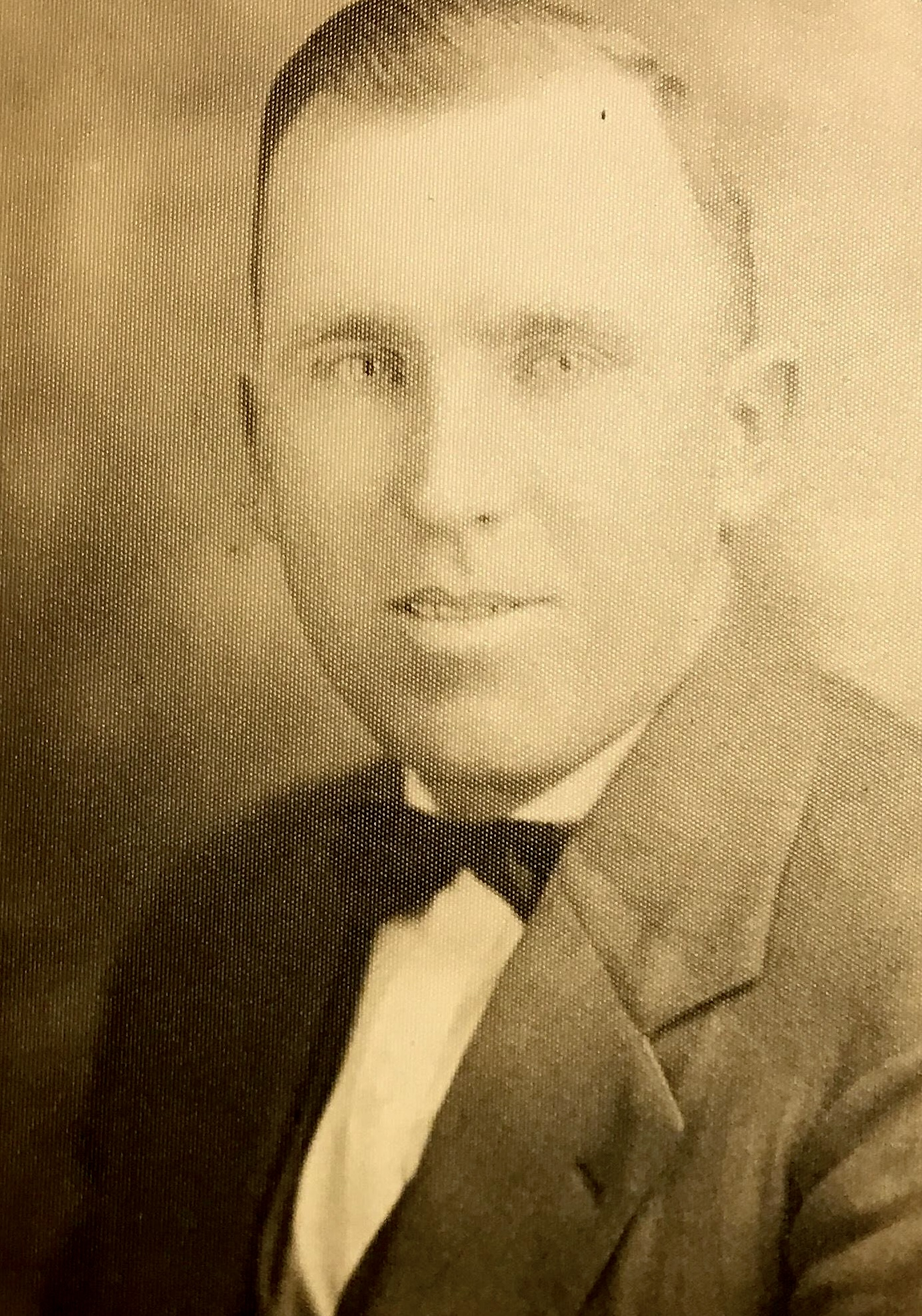
- Quinn, circa 1930
- Born: July 7, 1898; Safford, Arizona Territory, U.S.
- Died: July 26, 1988 (aged 90); Globe, Arizona, U.S.
- Resting place: Greenwood Memory Lawn Cemetery, Phoenix, Arizona
- Occupations: Baseball player, manager, umpire, politician, law enforcement officer
- Known for: Arizona baseball, Gila County Supervisor, Arizona State Highway Commission Chairman
- Political party: Democratic
- Spouse(s): Flora Mae Triniman (m, 1919)

Lester Floyd "Letch" Quinn (July 7, 1898 – July 26, 1988) was an American baseball player, manager, umpire, politician, and law enforcement officer. He played a prominent role in Arizona's sports history and public infrastructure development during the mid-20th century. Quinn was notable for pioneering Arizona baseball, serving seven terms as Gila County Supervisor during the Great Depression, and chairing the Arizona State Highway Commission.

== Early life and education ==
Quinn was born in Safford, Arizona Territory on July 7, 1898, the second child of Allen McGee and Mary Quinn. As a youth, he engaged in agricultural labor and helped haul coke with his father across Arizona. In 1912, Quinn's family moved to Miami, Arizona, where they opened the Miami Bottling Works, which later burned down.

Quinn attended Miami High School, excelling in multiple sports including baseball, basketball, track, and boxing. Between 1915 and 1918, he was a champion boxer, winning the Southwest Championship in El Paso, Texas. Quinn also pitched for the Miami High School baseball team and in the Copper Mine League. During the 1917–1918 season, Quinn pitched every game and led the team to runner-up in the state championship tournament, losing only one game in the season.

During the 1917 Globe-Miami miners' strike, Quinn was deputized by the Miami Police Department to maintain civil order. He enlisted for service in World War I on November 11, 1918, but was discharged the same day the war ended, receiving $2.00 in pay.

== Baseball career ==
Following World War I, Quinn's baseball career flourished. From 1921 to 1922, he pitched for the Midway Gas Company team in the California Winter League, achieving 23 strikeouts in 11 innings and leading his team to the Winter League Championship.

Between 1924 and 1925, Quinn was player-manager of the Miami Miners of the Arizona State League.

Quinn pitched the first no-hit, no-run game in the league during a victory over Mesa on July 29, 1927. In 1928, he was voted "Arizona's Most Popular Player" by the league's players and fans. By 1930, Quinn transitioned to umpiring in the league.

In 1931, Quinn played for a Minor League Baseball team in Seattle in the Pacific Coast League. From 1932 to 1937, he managed the Arizona Edison Company baseball team, leading them to multiple victories in the Copper League.

== Political career ==
During the Great Depression, Quinn entered public service, winning election as Gila County Supervisor in 1935. He served seven consecutive terms until 1949.

Quinn was a strong advocate for road improvements, overseeing numerous paving projects in Miami, Claypool, Winkelman, and Hayden, often utilizing federal Works Progress Administration (WPA) funds. He played a central role in improving roads such as the Globe-Winkelman Road and Six Shooter Canyon Road, many of which were later maintained by the Arizona Department of Transportation.

Quinn also pushed for tax reductions in Gila County, achieving the lowest tax levy in county history by 1937. Additionally, he worked with Ernest McCray to improve roads on the San Carlos Apache Reservation in 1941.

Quinn spearheaded efforts to establish a modern hospital in Gila County, leading successful bond campaigns, though initial plans were delayed due to World War II.

== Law enforcement career ==
In 1949, Quinn was elected Undersheriff of Gila County, serving until approximately 1957. He oversaw operations at the historic Gila County Jail and contributed to high-profile investigations including homicide cases and fraud involving a missing Navy veteran.

== Arizona State Highway Commission ==
On April 22, 1957, Governor Ernest McFarland appointed Quinn to the Arizona State Highway Commission representing the 4th District, covering Navajo, Apache, and Gila counties. In 1959, Quinn was elected Chairman of the commission.

During his tenure, Quinn oversaw major infrastructure projects, including the dedication of Interstate 40 east of Winslow and the completion of the Glenn Canyon Bridge, which was the world's highest arch bridge at its completion.

Quinn also contributed to highway improvements through Salt River Canyon and resolved traffic bottlenecks in Globe shortly before the end of his commission term in 1960.

Additional projects credited to Quinn include construction and paving of bridges and roads in Ice House Canyon, Cottonwood Street, Warrior Canyon, and Broad Street in Claypool.

== Later years and legacy ==
After concluding his role on the Highway Commission, Quinn spent his later years at his cabin in the White Mountains, engaging in leisure activities such as hunting, fishing, golf, and bowling.

Quinn remained politically active, supporting Congressman George F. Senner Jr. and serving as chairman of the Military Academies Selection Committee and the Keep-Senner-in-Congress Committee in the 1960s.

In 1971, Quinn was honored during the dedication of the Highway Heritage Display by the State of Arizona.

Quinn died on July 26, 1988, in Globe, Arizona, at age 90. He was survived by his wife, daughter, and son-in-law. His funeral was attended by notable Arizonans including Governor Rose Mofford, who credited Quinn with inspiring her political career.

In 2007, Quinn was posthumously inducted as the inaugural member of the Miami Sports Hall of Fame.

In 2025, the Lester F. Quinn Memorial Association was incorporated as a domestic nonprofit in Arizona on July 28, with the purpose of preserving and promoting the life, legacy, and contributions of Lester F. Quinn. As part of Quinn’s continuing legacy and lasting impact, the association later secured the listing of the Quinn Cabin in Lakeside, Arizona, on the National Register of Historic Places after the Arizona State Historic Preservation Office approved the nomination on November 21, 2025, by a vote of 5–1.

In 2026, the Arizona State Board on Geographic and Historic Names approved a motion on October 27 to designate a portion of Arizona State Route 77, between Winkelman, Arizona and Globe, Arizona, as the L. F. Quinn Memorial Highway. The designation honors Quinn's contributions to highway development in Arizona, including his efforts to have Arizona State Route 77 incorporated into the state highway system.
