= Bisbee Bees =

- 1928–1941; (1928–1932, 1937–1941); Bisbee, Arizona

Minor league affiliations
- Previous classes: Class C (1940–1941); Class D (1928–1932, 1937–1939)
- Previous leagues: Arizona State League (1928–1930); Arizona–Texas League (1931–1932, 1937–1941)

Major league affiliations
- Previous teams: Chicago Cubs (1939–1941); Cincinnati Reds (1937); Chicago Cubs (1930)

Minor league titles
- League titles: 1930

Team data
- Previous parks: Warren Ballpark

The Bisbee Bees were a Minor League Baseball team that represented Bisbee, Arizona from 1928 to 1941. The Bisbee Bees played as members of the Arizona State League (1928–1930) and Arizona–Texas League (1931–1932, 1937–1941).

The Bees were an affiliate of the Chicago Cubs in 1930, the Cincinnati Reds in 1937, the Los Angeles Angels in 1939, and Chicago Cubs from 1939 to 1941.

In 1930 they were "apparent champions" of the Arizona State Baseball League, after the Globe Bears disbanded.
