= Ernie Choukalos =

Canadian football player (1927–1993)

Ernie (Chick) Choukalos
Profile
- Positions: End, Guard, Tackle

Personal information
- Born: February 11, 1927; Drumheller, Alberta, Canada
- Died: February 20, 1993 (aged 66); Bakersfield, California, U.S.
- Listed height: 6 ft 2 in (1.88 m)
- Listed weight: 203 lb (92 kg)

Career history
- 1946, 1949: Calgary Stampeders
- 1951–1953: Saskatchewan Roughriders
- 1954–1955: BC Lions

Ernest W. "Chick" Choukalos (February 11, 1927 – February 20, 1993) was a Canadian professional football player who played for the Calgary Stampeders, Saskatchewan Roughriders and BC Lions. He also played minor league baseball in the United States.
