= Dick Gyselman =

American baseball player (1908–1990)

- Third baseman
- Born: April 6, 1908; San Francisco, California, U.S.
- Died: September 20, 1990 (aged 82); Seattle, Washington, U.S.
- Batted: Right Threw: Right

MLB debut
- April 20, 1933, for the Boston Braves

Last MLB appearance
- July 22, 1934, for the Boston Braves

MLB statistics
- Batting average: .225
- Home runs: 0
- Runs batted in: 16
- Stats at Baseball Reference

Teams
- Boston Braves (1933–1934)

Richard Ronald Gyselman (April 6, 1908 – September 20, 1990) was an American professional baseball third baseman in Major League Baseball. He played for the Boston Braves in 1933 and 1934.

For his success in minor league baseball, Gyselman was a 2003 inductee in the Pacific Coast League Hall of Fame.
