= Pete Compton =

American baseball player (1889–1978)

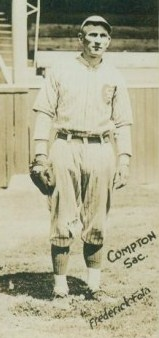
- Outfielder
- Born: September 28, 1889; San Marcos, Texas, U.S.
- Died: February 3, 1978 (aged 88); Kansas City, Missouri, U.S.
- Batted: Left Threw: Left

MLB debut
- September 6, 1911, for the St. Louis Browns

Last MLB appearance
- September 2, 1918, for the New York Giants

MLB statistics
- Batting average: .241
- Home runs: 5
- Runs batted in: 80
- Stats at Baseball Reference

Teams
- St. Louis Browns (1911–1913); St. Louis Terriers (1915); Boston Braves (1915–1916); Pittsburgh Pirates (1916); New York Giants (1918)

Anna Sebastian "Pete" Compton (September 28, 1889 – February 3, 1978) was an American Major League Baseball outfielder who played in parts of six seasons from 1911 to 1918 with five major league teams. In all, Compton would spend 20 years in professional baseball, including two seasons as a player-manager.

== Life and career ==
Compton was born in San Marcos, Texas. After three seasons in the minors (beginning as a 19-year-old in 1909), Compton hit .352 for Battle Creek, Michigan-based Battle Creek Crickets in the Class C Southern Michigan League before being signed to the St. Louis Browns, where he hit .271 in 28 games.

Compton spent all of 1912 in St. Louis, splitting time in left and right field and also logging 34 games as a pinch hitter. Compton batted .280 but committed nine errors in left field, fourth-worst in the AL despite spending only 49 games there. (That season, Compton also became a part of a strange quirk of the record books: one of his pinch-hit appearances was credited to a nonexistent player named "Lou Proctor", and thus Proctor was listed in the encyclopedias until the 1960s. According to legend, the real Lou Proctor was a telegraph operator who inserted his own name into the box score.)

After spending the next three seasons bouncing up and down between the Browns and their top minor league team in Kansas City, Compton went across town and jumped to the St. Louis Terriers of the Federal League. After playing just two games with the Terriers (both ends of a doubleheader on July 24), an injunction forced Compton to return to Kansas City; he was then sold to the Boston Braves in August, remaining there for the rest of the 1915 season. The following year, the Braves sold Compton to the Pittsburgh Pirates in July, only to have Pete return to Boston 11 days later; he hit just .184 in the major leagues, but managed a .291 mark for Louisville. After spending the entire 1917 season in the minors, Louisville sold Compton to the New York Giants in 1918, where he hit just .217 in 21 games; this would be his final big-league stop.

Although his MLB days were done, Compton would stay in the game for another decade; he played for four Pacific Coast League clubs from 1919 to 1923, then headed south to Houston of the Texas League, where he took over as manager near the end of the 1925 season. After stops in Ft. Worth, Wichita and Denver, Compton headed in 1928 to Miami, Arizona, managing the Miami Miners of the Arizona State League to a 30–38 record and batting .310. After the season, Compton finally retired after two decades in pro ball.

Compton returned to Kansas City, where he died on February 3, 1978, at the age of 88.
