= Herb Hall (baseball) =

American baseball player (1893–1970)

- Pitcher
- Born: June 5, 1893; Steeleville, Illinois, U.S.
- Died: July 1, 1970 (aged 77); Fresno, California, U.S.
- Batted: Both Threw: Right

MLB debut
- April 25, 1918, for the Detroit Tigers

Last MLB appearance
- May 3, 1918, for the Detroit Tigers

MLB statistics
- Win–loss record: 0–0
- Earned run average: 15.00
- Strikeouts: 1
- Stats at Baseball Reference

Teams
- Detroit Tigers (1918)

Herbert Silas "Iron Duke" Hall (June 5, 1893 – July 1, 1970) was an American Major League Baseball pitcher who played in three games for the Detroit Tigers in 1918.
