= Joe Orrell =

American baseball player (1917–1993)

- Pitcher
- Born: March 6, 1917; National City, California, U.S.
- Died: January 12, 1993 (aged 75); Chula Vista, California, U.S.
- Batted: Right Threw: Right

MLB debut
- August 12, 1943, for the Detroit Tigers

Last MLB appearance
- August 6, 1945, for the Detroit Tigers

MLB statistics
- Win–loss record: 4-4
- Earned run average: 3.01
- Strikeouts: 26
- Stats at Baseball Reference

Teams
- Detroit Tigers (1943–1945)

Forest Gordon "Joe" Orrell (March 6, 1917 – January 12, 1993) was an American pitcher for the Detroit Tigers in Major League Baseball.
