= Arizona–Texas League =

American minor league baseball league

- Formerly: Arizona State League
- Classification: Class D (1931–1932; 1937–1939); Class C (1940–1941, 1947–1950, 1952–1954)
- Sport: Minor League Baseball
- First season: 1931
- Folded: 1954
- Replaced by: Arizona-Mexico League
- President: Wilford S. Sullinger (1931); Allan Stewart (1931); P. A. Nathan (1932); Dr. R. E. Soners (1937–1941); G. R. Michaels (1947); Riney B. Salmon (1948–1950); G. R. Sloane (1952–1953); Tim Cusick (1954)
- No. of teams: 11
- Country: Mexico; United States of America
- Most titles: 5 El Paso Texans
- Related competitions: Southwest International League

The Arizona–Texas League was a Class D level American minor league baseball league that existed for nine seasons, from 1931–32, 1937–41, 1947–50 and 1952-54. In 1951, the Arizona-Texas loop merged with the Sunset League (based primarily in California but with teams in Nevada and New Mexico) to form the Southwest International League. However, the Arizona and Texas clubs played only that one season (1951) in the new circuit before seceding and reforming the A-TL in 1952. From 1928 to 1930, it was known as the Arizona State League.

== History ==
After the 1930 season, the Arizona State League, which began play in 1928, changed their name and evolved into the 1931 Class D Arizona–Texas League. Arizona State League president Wilford S. Sullinger remained as president of the newly named league. Former Arizona State League members Bisbee Bees, El Paso Texans, Globe Bears, Phoenix Senators and Tucson Missions continued play in the 1931 Arizona–Texas League, joined by the Nogales Internationals.

The Arizona–Texas League was the lowest level in the minor leagues, Class D, through 1939, and upgraded to Class C from 1940 onward. Its longest tenured clubs included:

- El Paso, Texas
- Bisbee and Bisbee-Douglas, Arizona
- Phoenix, Arizona
- Tucson, Arizona

The Arizona-Texas circuit also had teams in Mexico as early as 1931, although its name did not reflect this fact. Indios de Ciudad Juárez team was a member for seven years in the 1940s and 1950s. But in 1955, when the league lost its lone Texas franchise, in El Paso, its name was formally changed to the Arizona–Mexico League. In 1958, its Phoenix franchise moved all the way up to Class AAA when it received the old San Francisco Seals club after the Giants moved West. That signaled the end of the Class C Arizona–Mexico League; its final champion in 1958 was the Douglas Copper Kings, an affiliate of the Pittsburgh Pirates.

== List of teams ==
- Albuquerque, New Mexico: Albuquerque Dons (1932); Albuquerque Cardinals (1937–1941)
- Bisbee, Arizona: Bisbee Bees (1931–1932; 1937–1941); Bisbee Yanks (1947)
- Bisbee, Arizona & Douglas, Arizona: Bisbee-Douglas Miners (1948); Bisbee-Douglas Copper Kings (1949–1950; 1952–1954)
- Cananea, Sonora, Mexico: Cananea Mineros (1954)
- Chihuahua, Chihuahua, Mexico: Chihuahua Dorados (1952)
- Ciudad Juárez, Chihuahua, Mexico: Juarez Indios (1947–1950; 1952–1954)
- El Paso, Texas: El Paso Texans (1931–1932; 1937–1941; 1947–1950; 1952–1954)
- Globe, Arizona: Globe Bears (1931)
- Globe, Arizona & Miami, Arizona: Globe-Miami Browns (1947–1950)
- Mesa, Arizona: Mesa Orphans (1947)
- Mexicali, Baja California, MEX: Mexicali Eagles (1953–1954)
- Nogales, Sonora, Mexico: Nogales Internationals (1931; Nogales Yaquis (1954)
- Phoenix, Arizona: Phoenix Senators (1931–1932; 1947–1950; 1952–1953); Phoenix Stars (1954)
- Tucson, Arizona: Tucson Missions (1931); Tucson Lizards (1932; Tucson Cowboys (1937–1941; 1947–1950; 1952–1954)

== Champion teams ==
- 1931 – El Paso Texans
- 1932 – Unknown
- 1937 – Albuquerque Cardinals
- 1938 – El Paso Texans
- 1939 – Albuquerque Cardinals
- 1940 – El Paso Texans
- 1941 – Tucson Cowboys
- 1947 – Globe-Miami Browns
- 1948 – Globe-Miami Browns
- 1949 – El Paso Texans
- 1950 – El Paso Texans
- 1952 – Juarez Indios
- 1953 – Tucson Cowboys
- 1954 – Phoenix Stars

== Standings & statistics ==
=== 1931 to 1940 ===
1931 Arizona–Texas League schedule

| Team standings | W | L | PCT | GB | Managers |
|---|---|---|---|---|---|
| El Paso Texans | 79 | 52 | .603 | – | Royce Washburn |
| Tucson Missions | 72 | 59 | .550 | 7.0 | Bobby Coltrin |
| Phoenix Senators | 65 | 63 | .508 | 12½ | Louis Guisto |
| Bisbee Bees | 63 | 68 | .481 | 16.0 | Roy Johnson |
| Nogales Internationals | 62 | 67 | .481 | 16.0 | Dick Cox |
| Globe Bears | 49 | 81 | .377 | 29½ | Mickey Shader |

Playoff: El Paso 5 games, Bisbee 0.

Player statistics
| Player | Team | Stat | Tot | Player | Team | Stat | Tot |
|---|---|---|---|---|---|---|---|
| John Keane | Bisbee | BA | .408 | Joe Sullivan | Tucson | W | 23 |
| Emil Mailho | Phoenix | Runs | 108 | George Nielson | El Paso | SO | 196 |
| Red Anderson | Tusc/Noga | Hits | 190 | Joe Sullivan | Tucson | Pct | .767; 23–7 |
| Walter Carson | Globe | HR | 34 | | | | |

1932 Arizona–Texas League

| Team standings | W | L | PCT | GB | Managers |
|---|---|---|---|---|---|
| Albuquerque Dons | 57 | 42 | .576 | – | Bobby Coltrin |
| Bisbee Bees | 50 | 49 | .505 | 7.0 | Roy Johnson |
| El Paso Texans | 51 | 53 | .490 | 8½ | Royce Washburn |
| Tucson Lizards | 44 | 53 | .454 | 12.0 | Mickey Shader |
| Phoenix Senators | 8 | 13 | .381 | NA | Dick Cox |

Phoenix disbanded May 9. The league disbanded July 24.

Player statistics
| Player | Team | Stat | Tot | Player | Team | Stat | Tot |
|---|---|---|---|---|---|---|---|
| Dick Gyselman | Albuquerque | BA | .392 | Bill Chamberlain | Phoe/Alb | W | 15 |
| Dick Gyselman | Albuquerque | Runs | 104 | Guido Simoni | Phoe/Tucs | SO | 157 |
| Dick Gyselman | Albuquerque | Hits | 165 | Boyd Biggers | El Paso | ERA | 3.78 |
| Vince DiMaggio | Tucson | HR | 25 | | | | |

1937 Arizona–Texas League

| Team standings | W | L | PCT | GB | Managers |
|---|---|---|---|---|---|
| El Paso Texans | 73 | 49 | .598 | – | Jimmy Zinn |
| Tucson Cowboys | 57 | 58 | .496 | 12½ | Harry Krause |
| Albuquerque Cardinals | 56 | 59 | .487 | 13½ | Bill DeLancey |
| Bisbee Bees | 51 | 71 | .418 | 22.0 | Mickey Shader |

Playoffs: Albuquerque defeated El Paso in a one game playoff for the second half title.
Finals: Albuquerque 4 games, El Paso 3.

Player statistics
| Player | Team | Stat | Tot | Player | Team | Stat | Tot |
|---|---|---|---|---|---|---|---|
| Richard Lang | Albuquerque | BA | .374 | Milo Candini | El Paso | W | 21 |
| Hubert Singer | Albuquerque | Runs | 122 | Floyd Bevens | El Paso | SO | 179 |
| Richard Lang | Albuquerque | RBI | 109 | Lawrence Powell | Tucson | ERA | 2.56 |
| James Nicholson | El Paso | HR | 10 | Ken Manning | El Paso | Hits | 179 |

1938 Arizona–Texas League

| Team standings | W | L | PCT | GB | Managers |
|---|---|---|---|---|---|
| Bisbee Bees | 72 | 58 | .554 | – | Charlie Moglia |
| El Paso Texans | 68 | 64 | .515 | 5.0 | Jimmy Zinn |
| Albuquerque Cardinals | 67 | 65 | .508 | 6.0 | Bill DeLancey |
| Tucson Cowboys | 55 | 75 | .423 | 17.0 | Harry Krause |

Playoffs: El Paso 4 games, Bisbee 3.

Player statistics
| Player | Team | Stat | Tot | Player | Team | Stat | Tot |
|---|---|---|---|---|---|---|---|
| Mike Simon | Tucson | BA | .367 | Jesse Flores | Bisbee | W | 24 |
| Dick Warfield | Bisbee | Runs | 120 | Walter Stewart | El Paso | W | 24 |
| Ed Morris | Albuquerque | Runs | 120 | Walter Stewart | El Paso | SO | 270 |
| Mike Simon | Tucson | Hits | 195 | Jesse Flores | Bisbee | ERA | 2.37 |
| Mike Simon | Tucson | RBI | 121 | Bill Creager | Bisbee | HR | 20 |

1939 Arizona–Texas League

| Team standings | W | L | PCT | GB | Managers |
|---|---|---|---|---|---|
| Bisbee Bees | 72 | 57 | .558 | – | Carl Dittmar |
| Albuquerque Cardinals | 70 | 60 | .538 | 2½ | Bill DeLancey |
| El Paso Texans | 68 | 62 | .523 | 4½ | Ted Mayer |
| Tucson Cowboys | 49 | 80 | .380 | 23.0 | Bill Salkeld / Mike Simon |

Playoffs: Albuquerque 4 games, Bisbee 2.

Player statistics
| Player | Team | Stat | Tot | Player | Team | Stat | Tot |
|---|---|---|---|---|---|---|---|
| Bob Joratz | Albuquerque | BA | .348 | Eddie King | Bisbee | W | 25 |
| Bob Joratz | Albuquerque | Runs | 126 | Jack Hawkins | El Paso | SO | 257 |
| Willie Reyes | Albuquerque | RBI | 124 | Ned Rogers | El Paso | ERA | 2.20 |
| Dale Gill | Bisbee | Hits | 182 | Al Montgomery | Bisbee | HR | 17 |

1940 Arizona–Texas League

| Team standings | W | L | PCT | GB | Managers |
|---|---|---|---|---|---|
| Tucson Cowboys | 64 | 59 | .520 | – | Lester Patterson |
| El Paso Texans | 64 | 60 | .516 | ½ | Specs Williamson |
| Albuquerque Cardinals | 60 | 64 | .484 | 4½ | Jack Farmer |
| Bisbee Bees | 58 | 63 | .479 | 5.0 | Carl Dittmar |

Playoffs: El Paso 4 games, Tucson 3.

Player statistics
| Player | Team | Stat | Tot | Player | Team | Stat | Tot |
|---|---|---|---|---|---|---|---|
| Joe Brovia | El Paso | BA | .383 | Bob Raines | El Paso | W | 18 |
| Elwood Curtis | Albuquerque | Runs | 118 | Frank Totaro | Bisbee | SO | 251 |
| Harry Clements | Tucson | Hits | 175 | Luther French | Albuquerque | ERA | 3.50 |
| Joe Brovia | El Paso | RBI | 103 | Joe Skeber | El Paso | HR | 10 |

=== 1941 to 1950 ===
1941 Arizona–Texas League schedule

| Team standings | W | L | PCT | GB | Managers |
|---|---|---|---|---|---|
| Tucson Cowboys | 86 | 46 | .652 | – | Lester Patterson |
| Albuquerque Cardinals | 63 | 65 | .492 | 21.0 | Jimmy Zinn |
| El Paso Texans | 61 | 71 | .462 | 25.0 | Specs Williamson |
| Bisbee Bees | 51 | 79 | .392 | 34.0 | Carl Dittmar |

Playoffs: None Scheduled

Player statistics
| Player | Team | Stat | Tot | Player | Team | Stat | Tot |
|---|---|---|---|---|---|---|---|
| Burl Horton | El Paso | BA | .375 | Harry Parks | Albuquerque | W | 24 |
| Doug Smith | Tucson | Runs | 147 | Marino Pieretti | El Paso | SO | 237 |
| Burl Horton | El Paso | Hits | 216 | Lee Porterfield | Tucson | ERA | 3.01 |
| Clarence Maddern | Bisbee | RBI | 129 | Doug Smith | Tucson | HR | 15 |

1947 Arizona–Texas League schedule

| Team standings | W | L | PCT | GB | Attend | Managers |
|---|---|---|---|---|---|---|
| Phoenix Senators | 82 | 51 | .617 | – | 55,452 | Alton Biggs |
| Tucson Cowboys | 80 | 52 | .606 | 1½ | 63,580 | Joe Vosmik |
| Bisbee Yanks | 74 | 59 | .556 | 8½ | 33,686 | Charlie Metro |
| Juarez Indios / Mesa Orphans | 61 | 69 | .469 | 19½ | 27,153 | Manuel Fortes |
| Globe-Miami Browns | 53 | 77 | .408 | 27½ | 60,669 | Lloyd Brown |
| El Paso Texans | 44 | 86 | .338 | 36½ | 39,996 | Syd Cohen |

Juarez disbanded June 22 after winning the first half and was replaced by Mesa June 27.
Playoffs: Tucson 2 games, Bisbee 0; Globe-Miami 2 games, Phoenix 0; Finals: Globe–Miami 3 games, Tucson 2.

Player statistics
| Player | Team | Stat | Tot | Player | Team | Stat | Tot |
|---|---|---|---|---|---|---|---|
| Billy Martin | Phoenix | BA | .392 | John Conant | Phoenix | W | 19 |
| Pete Hughes | Phoenix | Runs | 180 | Lloyd Brown | Globe-Miami | SO | 167 |
| Billy Martin | Phoenix | Hits | 230 | Syd Cohen | El Paso | ERA | 3.38 |
| Billy Martin | Phoenix | RBI | 174 | Pete Hughes | Phoenix | HR | 38 |
| Pete Hughes | Phoenix | BB | 193 | | | | |

1948 Arizona–Texas League

| Team standings | W | L | PCT | GB | Attend | Managers |
|---|---|---|---|---|---|---|
| Globe-Miami Browns | 80 | 60 | .571 | – | 75,001 | Don Heffner |
| Tucson Cowboys | 78 | 62 | .557 | 2.0 | 79,327 | Lloyd Brown |
| El Paso Texans | 74 | 66 | .529 | 6.0 | 73,766 | Walter Millies |
| Juarez Indios | 74 | 66 | .529 | 6.0 | 52,525 | Manuel Fortes / Francisco Barradas |
| Phoenix Senators | 67 | 73 | .479 | 13.0 | 79,821 | Alton Biggs |
| Bisbee-Douglas Miners | 47 | 93 | .336 | 33.0 | 43,610 | Mel Steiner / Mitchell Chetkovitch |

Playoffs: El Paso defeated Juarez in a one game playoff for third place; Globe–Miami 4 games, El Paso 2; Juarez 4 games, Tucson 1.
Finals: Globe–Miami 4 games, Juarez 3.

Player statistics
| Player | Team | Stat | Tot | Player | Team | Stat | Tot |
|---|---|---|---|---|---|---|---|
| Gene Lillard | Phoenix | BA | .364 | Thomas Radcliff | El Paso | W | 17 |
| Dick Sabatini | Phoenix | Runs | 145 | Alwin Aguilar | Tucson | | 17 |
| Ramon Vargas | Tucson | Hits | 197 | William Abernathie | Tucson | | 17 |
| Daniel Baich | Globe-Miami | RBI | 152 | Edward Graham | Phoenix | SO | 178 |
| Daniel Baich | Globe-Miami | HR | 27 | Lloyd Brown | Tucson | ERA | 3.01 |
| Pete Hughes | Phoenix | BB | 207 | | | | |

1949 Arizona–Texas League schedule

| Team standings | W | L | PCT | GB | Attend | Managers |
|---|---|---|---|---|---|---|
| Phoenix Senators | 94 | 55 | .631 | – | 126,347 | Don Trower |
| Juarez Indios | 92 | 58 | .613 | 2½ | 85,769 | Hector Leal / Victor Canales |
| Tucson Cowboys | 74 | 76 | .493 | 20½ | 53,771 | Gene Lillard |
| El Paso Texans | 67 | 83 | .447 | 27½ | 107,778 | Syd Cohen |
| Bisbee-Douglas Copper Kings | 66 | 83 | .443 | 28.0 | 60,149 | Elmer Williamson / Paul Jones; Buck Elliott |
| Globe-Miami Browns | 56 | 94 | .373 | 38½ | 60,394 | Frank Volpi / Edward Dancisak |

Playoffs: Phoenix 4 games, Tucson 2; El Paso 4 games, Juarez 2.
Finals: El Paso 4 games, Phoenix 2.

Player statistics
| Player | Team | Stat | Tot | Player | Team | Stat | Tot |
|---|---|---|---|---|---|---|---|
| Vinicio Garcia | Juarez | BA | .377 | Edward Graham | Phoenix | W | 24 |
| Vinicio Garcia | Juarez | Runs | 170 | Richard Drilling | Phoenix | ERA | 2.55 |
| Vinicio Garcia | Juarez | Hits | 227 | William Abernathie | Tucson | SO | 220 |
| Dick Steinhauer | Phoenix | RBI | 151 | Gene Lillard | Tucson | BB | 154 |
| Gene Clough | Bisbee-Douglass | HR | 37 | | | | |

1950 Arizona–Texas League schedule

| Team standings | W | L | PCT | GB | Attend | Managers |
|---|---|---|---|---|---|---|
| Juarez Indios | 93 | 55 | .628 | – | 69,738 | Syd Cohen |
| El Paso Texans | 92 | 58 | .613 | 2.0 | 100,212 | Art Lilly |
| Phoenix Senators | 82 | 68 | .547 | 12.0 | 104,137 | Don Trower |
| Bisbee-Douglas Copper Kings | 69 | 79 | .466 | 24.0 | 68,651 | Buck Elliott |
| Tucson Cowboys | 64 | 86 | .427 | 30.0 | 61,254 | Hank Leiber |
| Globe-Miami Browns | 48 | 102 | .320 | 46.0 | 47,388 | Thornton Lee |

Playoffs: Phoenix 4 games, Juarez 2; El Paso 4 games, Bisbee-Douglas 2.
Finals: El Paso 4 games, Phoenix 2.

Player statistics
| Player | Team | Stat | Tot | Player | Team | Stat | Tot |
|---|---|---|---|---|---|---|---|
| Art Lilly | El Paso | BA | .386 | Hector Anzamar | Juarez | W | 25 |
| Alfredo Perez | Tucson | Runs | 172 | Jesus Valenzuela | Juarez | W | 25 |
| Dick Zwaing | Tucson | Hits | 221 | Jesus Valenzuela | Juarez | SO | 256 |
| Len Noren | Phoenix | RBI | 169 | Jesus Valenzuela | Juarez | ERA | 3.47 |
| Donald Mason | El Paso | RBI | 169 | Hector Lara | El Paso | HR | 28 |

=== 1952 to 1954 ===
1952 Arizona–Texas League

| Team standings | W | L | PCT | GB | Attend | Managers |
|---|---|---|---|---|---|---|
| Juarez Indios | 84 | 55 | .604 | – | 64,870 | Manuel Fortes |
| El Paso Texans | 79 | 61 | .564 | 5½ | 83,373 | Art Lilly |
| Phoenix Senators | 78 | 62 | .557 | 6½ | 64,410 | Jeep Trower |
| Tucson Cowboys | 61 | 78 | .439 | 23.0 | 68,500 | Don Jameson |
| Bisbee-Douglas Copper Kings | 60 | 80 | .429 | 24½ | 56,206 | Syd Cohen |
| Chihuahua Dorados | 57 | 83 | .407 | 27½ | 130,329 | Domingo Santana / Marvin Williams |

Playoffs: None Scheduled.

Player statistics
| Player | Team | Stat | Tot | Player | Team | Stat | Tot |
|---|---|---|---|---|---|---|---|
| Marvin Williams | Chihuahua | BA | .401 | Wenceslao Gonzalez | Juarez | W | 25 |
| Felipe Hernandez | Juarez | Runs | 144 | Wenceslao Gonzalez | Juarez | SO | 222 |
| Dick Steinhauer | Phoenix | Hits | 233 | Donald Cantrell | Phoenix | ERA | 3.64 |
| Ramon Vargas | El Paso | RBI | 143 | Marvin Williams | Chihuahua | HR | 45 |

1953 Arizona–Texas League

| Team standings | W | L | PCT | GB | Attend | Managers |
|---|---|---|---|---|---|---|
| Tucson Cowboys | 90 | 49 | .647 | – | 92,157 | Don Jameson |
| Mexicali Eagles | 77 | 62 | .554 | 13.0 | 68,719 | Art Lilly |
| Juarez Indios | 74 | 65 | .532 | 16.0 | 46,800 | Manuel Fortes / Pingua Canales |
| El Paso Texans | 60 | 80 | .429 | 30½ | 52,501 | Diamond Cecil |
| Bisbee-Douglas Copper Kings | 59 | 80 | .424 | 31.0 | 44,650 | Syd Cohen |
| Phoenix Senators | 58 | 82 | .414 | 32½ | 49,270 | Buck Elliott |

Playoffs: None Scheduled.

Player statistics
| Player | Team | Stat | Tot | Player | Team | Stat | Tot |
|---|---|---|---|---|---|---|---|
| Edwin Roberts | Tucson | BA | .392 | Corky Reddell | Tucson | W | 29 |
| Joe Joshua | Tucson | Runs | 164 | Wenceslao Gonzalez | Juarez | SO | 276 |
| Roberto Canales | Juarez | Hits | 208 | Corky Reddell | Tucson | ERA | 2.64 |
| Lloyd Jenney | Tucson | RBI | 152 | Charles Lundgren | Tucson | HR | 34 |

1954 Arizona–Texas League

| Team standings | W | L | PCT | GB | Attend | Managers |
|---|---|---|---|---|---|---|
| Phoenix Stars | 93 | 47 | .664 | – | 114,450 | Jerry Gardner |
| Mexicali Eagles | 92 | 48 | .657 | 1.0 | 92,377 | Art Lilly |
| Cananea Mineros | 69 | 71 | .493 | 24.0 | 85,083 | Memo Garibay |
| El Paso Texans | 69 | 71 | .493 | 24.0 | 63,401 | Syd Cohen |
| Tucson Cowboys | 64 | 76 | .457 | 29.0 | 60,735 | Don Jameson |
| Nogales Yaquis | 61 | 79 | .436 | 32.0 | 98,092 | Manuel Fortes / Virgilio Arteaga |
| Bisbee-Douglas Copper Kings | 57 | 83 | .407 | 36.0 | 45,031 | Edwin Roberts / Ron Smith |
| Juarez Indians | 55 | 85 | .393 | 38.0 | 69,365 | Enrique Fernandez |

Playoffs: None Scheduled.

Player statistics
| Player | Team | Stat | Tot | Player | Team | Stat | Tot |
|---|---|---|---|---|---|---|---|
| Leo Rodriquez | Cananea | BA | .430 | Nathaniel Moreland | Mexicali | W | 22 |
| Ken Toothman | Tucson | Runs | 193 | Richard Schroyer | Phoenix | SO | 196 |
| Leo Rodriquez | Cananea | Hits | 259 | Fernando Ramirez | Mexicali | ERA | 3.51 |
| Earl Smith | Phoenix | RBI | 195 | Claudio Solano | Cananea | TB | 394 |
| Claudio Solano | Cananea | HR | 47 | | | | |
