= Rudy Kallio =

American baseball player (1892–1979)

Rudolph Kallio
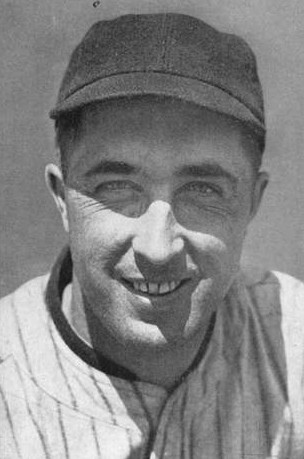
- Pitcher
- Born: December 14, 1892; Portland, Oregon, U.S.
- Died: April 6, 1979 (aged 86); Newport, Oregon, U.S.
- Batted: Switch Threw: Right

MLB debut
- April 25, 1918, for the Detroit Tigers

Last MLB appearance
- May 12, 1925, for the Boston Red Sox

MLB statistics
- Win–loss record: 9–18
- Earned run average: 4.17
- Strikeouts: 75
- Stats at Baseball Reference

Teams
- Detroit Tigers (1918–1919); Boston Red Sox (1925)

Rudolph Kallio (December 14, 1892 – April 6, 1979) was an American pitcher in Major League Baseball who played for two different teams between 1918 and 1925. Listed at 5' 10", 160 lb., Kallio batted and threw right-handed. He was born in Portland, Oregon, the son of Finnish immigrants. He graduated from Portland High School and began playing professional baseball at the age of 20. Before his baseball career, Kallio worked as a clerk in a railroad office.

Kallio entered the majors in 1918 with the Detroit Tigers, playing for them two years before joining the Boston Red Sox. In his rookie season, he showed promise as a solid starter for Detroit, going 8-14 with 70 strikeouts and a 3.62 ERA in 181⅓ innings pitched. But he developed a chronic bursitis that eventually ended his career, pitching only 22 innings the next season. He went 1-4 for the Red Sox in 1925, his last major league season.

In a three-year career, Kallio posted a 9-18 record with a 4.17 ERA in 49 appearances, including 27 starts, 10 complete games, two shutouts, one save, 75 strikeouts, and 222⅓ innings of work.

Following his playing career, Kallio worked as a coach and traveling secretary for the Portland Beavers (1943) and later scouted for the Chicago Cubs (1946). He died in Newport, Oregon at age 86.
