= Stoney McGlynn =

American baseball player (1872–1941)

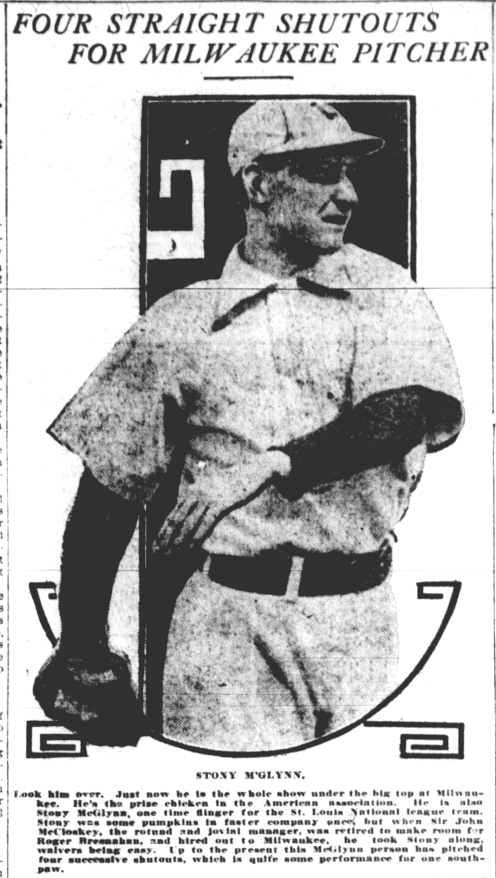
- Pitcher
- Born: May 26, 1872; Lancaster, Pennsylvania, U.S.
- Died: August 26, 1941 (aged 69); Manitowoc, Wisconsin, U.S.
- Batted: Right Threw: Right

MLB debut
- September 20, 1906, for the St. Louis Cardinals

Last MLB appearance
- September 2, 1908, for the St. Louis Cardinals

MLB statistics
- Win–loss record: 17–33
- Earned run average: 2.95
- Strikeouts: 157
- Stats at Baseball Reference

Teams
- St. Louis Cardinals (1906–1908)

Ulysses Simpson Grant "Stoney" McGlynn (May 26, 1872 – August 26, 1941) was an American professional baseball player who played pitcher in the Major Leagues from 1906 to 1908. He played for the St. Louis Cardinals.
