= Bisbee–Douglas Copper Kings =

- 1947–2003; (1947–1958, 2003); Bisbee, Arizona

Minor league affiliations
- Previous classes: Class C (1947–1958)
- League: Arizona–Mexico League (1955–1958, 2003)
- Previous leagues: Arizona–Texas League (1952–1954); Southwest International League (1951); Arizona–Texas League (1947–1950)

Major league affiliations
- Previous teams: Pittsburgh Pirates (1956–1958); Brooklyn Dodgers (1950–1951); New York Yankees (1947–1948)

Minor league titles
- League titles: 1 (1958)

Team data
- Previous names: Bisbee–Douglas Copper Kings (2003); Douglas Copper Kings (1956–1958); Bisbee–Douglas Copper Kings (1949–1955); Bisbee–Douglas Miners (1948); Bisbee Yanks (1947)
- Previous parks: Copper King Stadium; Warren Ballpark

The Bisbee–Douglas Copper Kings was a primary moniker of the minor league baseball teams based in Bisbee, Arizona and Douglas, Arizona between 1947 and 2003. They played as members of the Arizona–Texas League from 1947 to 1948, Southwest International League in 1951 and Arizona–Mexico League from 1955 to 1958.

The Bisbee–Douglas teams were an affiliate of the New York Yankees from 1947 to 1948, Brooklyn Dodgers from 1950 to 1951 and Pittsburgh Pirates from 1956 to 1958.

== History ==
The Arizona–Mexico League was active from 1955–58 and was the successor of the Arizona–Texas League. Following the 1955 season the team moved to Douglas for the 1956, 1957 and 1958 seasons.

The original Arizona–Mexico League team featured future major leaguers Clint Courtney, Johnny Keane, Jim Tobin and Earl Wilson.

On August 19, 1958, the Copper Kings set a baseball record when all nine players in their starting lineup hit a home run in the same game.

In 2003, the Bisbee–Douglas Copper Kings were briefly reconstituted in an independent professional league, also known as the Arizona–Mexico League, which suspended operations three weeks into the season. The 2003 Copper Kings resumed minor league play under manager Butch Hammett. Their general manager was John Guy. Local baseball historian David Skinner was minority owner. The Copper Kings ended with a final record of 9–7, tied for second place.

The 2003 Copper Kings gained national attention with their colorful promotions including Ted Williams Night in which they gave away free popsicles to their fans in relation to Ted Williams being cryogenically frozen in Scottsdale, Arizona. The 2003 club also made news with the signing of former National League base-stealing champion Chuck Carr, who played center field for the abbreviated season. Former Richmond Braves shortstop Jose Mateo also played with the Copper Kings.

== The ballpark ==
The team played home games in both Bisbee and Douglas. In Bisbee they played their home games at Warren Ballpark, the oldest ballpark in the United States, constructed in 1909. Games in Douglas were played at Copper King Stadium. Warren Ballpark, built with adobe and steel, still stands in a suburb of Bisbee as does Copper King Stadium in Douglas.
