= Arizona State League =

American minor league baseball league

- Classification: Class D (1928–1930)
- Sport: Minor League Baseball
- First season: 1928
- Folded: 1930
- Replaced by: Arizona–Texas League
- President: Paul Davis (1928); Fred Joyce (1929); Wilford S. Sullinger (1930)
- No. of teams: 7
- Country: United States of America
- Most titles: 1 Phoenix Senators (1928); Miami Miners (1929); Bisbee Bees (1930)

The Arizona State League was a semi-pro baseball league that existed from 1907 to 1927. First known newsprint started in 1907, as the league was referenced in area newspapers, but teams and format are not known until the 1923 playing season. After the 1927 season, the league made application to the National Association of Professional Baseball Clubs minor league baseball and were approved to begin play in 1928 as a Class D-level league, and consisted of teams based in Arizona and Texas, evolving into the Arizona–Texas League in 1931.

== History ==
Previous to the formation of the minor league, the "Arizona State League" operated as a semi-professional league beginning in 1907. Lester Quinn, who later chaired the Arizona State Highway Commission, threw a no-hitter for the Miami Miners in 1927.

The Arizona State League began play as a four-team Class D level minor league in the 1928 season, with all four charter franchises based in Arizona. The first league president was Paul Davis. The league charter members were the Bisbee Bees of Bisbee, Arizona, Miami Miners of Miami, Arizona, Phoenix Senators of Phoenix, Arizona, and Tucson Cowboys of Tucson, Arizona. The same four franchises played for the duration of the Arizona State League. The league was formed in February 1927, with Dr. John E. Bacon as their first president, with the four franchises and a team salary cap of $2,400. Major League Baseball Commissioner Kenesaw Mountain Landis was involved in awarding Bisbee its first professional minor league team, gaining his support after earlier Bisbee semi-pro teams had refused to sign players involved in the 1919 Black Sox Scandal.

In their first season of play in 1928, the Arizona State League played a regular season without playoffs. The Phoenix Senators were the 1928 Arizona State League Champions finishing with a 39–29 record, 2 games ahead of the second place Bisbee Bees (37–31). They were followed by the Miami Miners (30–38) and Tucson Cowboys (30–38).

The 1929 Arizona State League, with Fred Joyce becoming league president, became a six-team league adding the Globe Bears and Mesa Jewels as expansion franchises. The Mesa franchise withdrew from the league on July 24, and Mesa's remaining opponents were given 3 wins and 1 loss, as the remaining five teams finished the season. The Miami Miners won the first half title, and Bisbee won the second half, as the league began playing a split season schedule in 1929, with two champions meeting in the finals. The Bisbee Bees (60–30) had the best overall record. The Miami Miners (50–40), Globe Bears (48–42), Tucson Cowboys (43–47), Phoenix Senators (40–49), and Mesa Jewels (28–61) rounded out the 1929 final standings. The Mesa Jewels had folded on July 24, with an 18–25 record. For the remainder of the season, Mesa's scheduled opponents were given a record 3 wins and 1 loss for each scheduled series with the disbanded team. In the 1929 Finals, the Miami Miners defeated the Bisbee Bees 4 games to 3 to win the championship.

Miami was declared the winner of the seventh game of the 1929 Finals after a league meeting. The seventh game ended in the darkness with Bisbee ahead 14–13 in the 9th inning as thousands of Miami fans were on the field and throwing cushions. The game was stopped at that point and declared a “no contest” by league president Joyce. Both teams appealed Joyce’s decision. At a league meeting on October 27, 1929, Miami was awarded the title in a 2-to-1 vote by the other three teams.

In 1930, their final season of play, Wilford S. Sullinger became the Arizona State League president. The El Paso Texans of El Paso, Texas, joined the six-team league, replacing Mesa. At a league meeting on February 2, 1930, following a presentation, El Paso was awarded a franchise (over the Arizona cities of Mesa, Jerome, Clarksdale, Nogales, and Douglas), even though the nearest team was Bisbee at 284 miles and Phoenix was 430 miles. The 1930 Arizona State League was split into two half-seasons. Phoenix and Globe tied for the 1st half title and Bisbee won the second half title. The overall standings were led by Bisbee (60–45), followed by the El Paso Texans (58–47), Phoenix Senators (58–47), Globe Bears (56–49), Tucson Cowboys (45–60), and Miami Miners (38–67). In a playoff, Globe defeated Phoenix 3 games to 0 for the first half title. In the 1930 finals, Bisbee and Globe were tied at 3 games each when Bisbee won on a forfeit after Globe refused to play in Bisbee on September 17.

In the 1930 Finals, with the teams tied 3 games each, controversy ensued. After Globe and Bisbee could not agree on a location for the seventh game, league president Sullinger ruled the game would be played in Bisbee. In response, Globe president Al Floyd, citing finances in traveling to Bisbee, offered to play the game at a neutral site or to have the location decided by a coin flip. Sullinger reinforced that the seventh game was to be played in Bisbee and that Bisbee would be the league champion should Globe not play the game. Bisbee president C.T. Knapp noted the series had total revenues over $4,000 and Bisbee offered to pay half of the Globe travel expenses to Bisbee. Floyd and Globe ultimately refused to travel to play in Bisbee and the Bisbee Bees were declared the champions by forfeit.

After the 1930 season, the Arizona State League, with the continued addition of the El Paso franchise, changed their name and evolved into the 1931 Class D level Arizona–Texas League, with Sullinger remaining as president of the newly named league. The Bisbee Bees, El Paso Texans, Globe Bears, Phoenix Senators, and Tucson Missions continued play in 1931, joined by the Nogales Internationals.

== Arizona State League teams ==
Team name(s)	City represented	Ballpark	Year(s) active
Bisbee Bees	Bisbee, Arizona	Warren Park	1928 to 1930
El Paso Texans	El Paso, Texas	Dudley Field	1930
Globe Bears	Globe, Arizona	School Hill Park	1929 to 1930
Mesa Jewels	Mesa, Arizona	Rendezvous Park	1929
Miami Miners	Miami, Arizona	O’Brien Park	1928 to 1930
Phoenix Senators	Phoenix, Arizona	Phoenix Municipal Stadium	1928 to 1930
Tucson Cowboys	Tucson, Arizona	Hi Corbett Field	1928 to 1930

== Standings & statistics ==
1928 Arizona State League

Team standings	W	L	PCT	GB	Managers
Phoenix Senators	39	29	.574	–	Bert Whaling
Bisbee Bees	37	31	.544	2	Roy Johnson
Miami Miners	30	38	.441	9	Pete Compton
Tucson Cowboys/Waddies	30	38	.441	9	Rube Foster

Player statistics
Player	Team	Stat	Tot	Player	Team	Stat	Tot
John Alloway	Phoenix	BA	.381	Tom Vaughn	Bisbee	W	14
Lefty Colvard	Miami	Runs	58	Eddie Miller	Bisbee	Hits	104
Larmon Cox	Phoenix	HR	14				

1929 Arizona State League

Team standings	W	L	PCT	GB	Managers
Bisbee Bees	60	30	.667	–	Roy Johnson
Miami Miners	50	40	.556	10	Drap Hayes
Globe Bears	48	42	.533	12	Mickey Shader
Tucson Cowboys	43	47	.478	17	Tom Holley / Cliff McCarl; Pug Cavet
Phoenix Senators	40	49	.449	19½	Ross Lyall / Tom Burke / Ross Gardner / Chet Thomas
Mesa Jewels	28	61	.315	31½	Bill Whittaker / Ernie Lloyd; Lee Dempsey

Playoffs: Miami defeated Bisbee 4 games to 3.
Finals: Miami defeated the Bisbee Bees 4 games to 3. (Game 7 decided by league vote).

Player statistics
Player	Team	Stat	Tot	Player	Team	Stat	Tot
Arthur Parker	Bisbee	BA	.390	Glenn Gabler	Bisbee	W	20
Arthur Parker	Bisbee	Runs	99	John Mitchell	Phoenix	SO	147
Prince Oana	Globe	Hits	127	John Mitchell	Phoenix	ERA	3.18
Leo Burns	Bisbee	HR	23				

1930 Arizona State League

Team standings	W	L	PCT	GB	Managers
Bisbee Bees	60	45	.571	–	Roy Johnson
El Paso Texans	58	47	.552	2	Royce Washburn
Phoenix Senators	58	47	.552	2	Lou Guisto
Globe Bears	56	49	.533	4	Mickey Shader
Tucson Cowboys	45	60	.429	15	Pug Cavet / Walter Rehg
Miami Miners	38	67	.362	22	Drap Hayes / Bob Gillespie; George Cochrane

Globe and Phoenix tied for the first half title. Bisbee won the second half title. Playoff: Globe defeated Phoenix 3 games to 0 for the first half title.
Finals: Bisbee 3 games, Globe 3 games. Bisbee won on a forfeit when Globe refused to play in Bisbee on September 17.

Player statistics
Player	Team	Stat	Tot	Player	Team	Stat	Tot
Tony Antista	Bisbee	BA	.430	Charlie Biggs	Globe	W	20
Tony Antista	Bisbee	Runs	127	Charlie Biggs	Globe	SO	157
Tony Antista	Bisbee	Hits	191	Al McNeeley	Bisbee	Pct	.875; 14–2
Bob Stevenson	Phoenix	RBI	101	George Steward	Bisbee	HR	22
