= Globe-Miami Browns =

- 1929–1955; (1929–1931, 1947–1950, 1955); Globe, Arizona

Minor league affiliations
- Previous classes: Class C (1947–1950, 1955); Class D (1929–1931)
- League: Arizona–Mexico League (1955)
- Previous leagues: Arizona–Texas League (1931, 1947–1950); Arizona State League (1929–1930)

Major league affiliations
- Previous teams: St. Louis Browns (1947–1949)

Minor league titles
- League titles: 1947, 1948

Team data
- Previous names: Globe-Miami Miners (1955); Globe-Miami Browns (1947–1950); Globe Bears (1929–1931)

The Globe-Miami Browns were a Minor League Baseball team that represented Globe, Arizona and Miami, Arizona in the Arizona–Texas League from 1947 to 1950 and the Arizona–Mexico League in 1955.

An earlier team, the Globe Bears, represented Globe in the Arizona State League from 1929 to 1931.
