= Tucson Toros =

- 1915–2010; (1915, 1928–1932, 1937–1941, 1947–1958, 1969–2011); Tucson, Arizona

Minor league affiliations
- Previous classes: Independent (2009–2011); Triple-A (1970–2008); Class-C (1940–1941, 1947–1958); Class-D (1915, 1928–1932, 1937–1939)
- League: Golden Baseball League (2009–2011)
- Previous leagues: Pacific Coast League (1969–2008); Arizona–Mexico League (1955–1958); Arizona–Texas League (1952–1954); Southwest International League (1951); Arizona–Texas League (1931–1932, 1937–1941, 1947–1950); Arizona State League (1928–1930); Rio Grande Association (1915)

Major league affiliations
- Previous teams: Arizona Diamondbacks (1998–2008); Milwaukee Brewers (1997); Houston Astros (1980–1996); Texas Rangers (1977–1979); Oakland A's (1973–1976); Chicago White Sox (1969–1972); Cleveland Indians (1947–1950); Cincinnati Reds (1940–1941)

Minor league titles
- Class titles: 2006
- League titles: 1941, 1953, 1991, 1993, 2006
- Conference titles: 2006
- Division titles: 1973, 1991, 1993, 2006

Team data
- Previous names: Tucson Toros (2009–2010); Tucson Sidewinders (1998–2008); Tucson Toros (1969–1997); Tucson Cowboys (1937–1941, 1947–1958); Tucson Lizards (1932); Tucson Missions (1931); Tucson Cowboys (1929–1930); Tucson Waddies (1928); Tucson Old Pueblos (1915)
- Mascot: Tuffy the Toro (2009-2011, 1978-1998); Sandy Sidewinder (1998-2008); Freddie the Toro (1974-1977)
- Previous parks: Hi Corbett Field (2009–2011); Tucson Electric Park (1998–2008); Hi Corbett Field (1937–1997)

The Tucson Toros were a professional baseball team based in Tucson, Arizona, in the United States.

The original Toros were a Triple-A minor league baseball team in the Pacific Coast League from 1969 to 1997, where they won the PCL Championship in 1991 and 1993. They were affiliated with several Major League Baseball teams over the years, most notably with the Houston Astros. The team rebranded as the Tucson Sidewinders in 1998, a name under which they played until relocating to Reno following the 2008 season. During the Sidewinders era, the team won both the PCL and Triple-A championships for the 2006 season.

A new iteration of the Toros played in the independent Golden Baseball League for the 2009 and 2010 seasons. The team went on hiatus for the 2011 season but folded later that year.

== History ==
=== Early Tucson teams ===
Tucson had a number of baseball teams between 1915 and 1958, including the Tucson Old Pueblos, the Tucson Waddies, the Tucson Cowboys (several teams), the Tucson Missions and the Tucson Lizards. None of these were part of the Pacific Coast League. When the last iteration of the Cowboys folded in 1958, Tucson was left with no professional baseball until the advent of the Toros.

=== Tucson Toros (1969–1997) ===
Hiram "Hi" Corbett, a former Arizona state senator, helped to bring spring training to Tucson, in recognition of which Randolph Park in midtown Tucson's Reid Park was eventually renamed Hi Corbett Field. The Tucson Toros, a AAA team in the league's southern division, began play in 1969. The name Toros was suggested by name-the-team contest winner Clarence Dupnik, who went on to become the Sheriff of Pima County, Arizona.

From 1969 through 1972, the Tucson Toros were the AAA affiliate of the Chicago White Sox. During this period, the team managed no better than a fourth-place finish for the season. The Toros did better as the AAA team of the Oakland Athletics (1973–1976), winning the PCL Eastern Division title in 1973 and finishing in second place in 1975. As the Texas Rangers farm team (1977–1979) they finished in third and fourth place, but with outstanding individual performances by outfielder Billy Sample (AAA Minor League Player of the Year, 1978) and others.

==== The Astros era (1980–1996) ====
In 1980 the Toros began a long association with the Houston Astros. Following the lead of the parent club (which was widely criticized for its 1980s uniforms), the Toros introduced what some consider the ugliest uniform in the history of organized baseball: orange pants with yellow and red stripes, and a jersey with a turquoise back, yellow raglan sleeves, and a front resplendent in yellow, avocado, red, orange, and lime green stripes of various widths. The look in 1981, an all-orange uniform with red and yellow trim, was similarly ill-received.

In their first year of affiliation with the Astros, the Toros won the first half Southern Division title, but were quickly eliminated by the Albuquerque Dukes in the second half playoffs. The team spent most of the rest of the decade in third place for the season. In 1989, under new team owner Rick Holtzman, Mike Feder became the Toros' general manager, a post he would hold through the end of the Toros era of Tucson AAA baseball. His family-friendly promotions brought immediate results. The club was named Promotional Club of the Year in 1990, and had its highest season attendance to date.

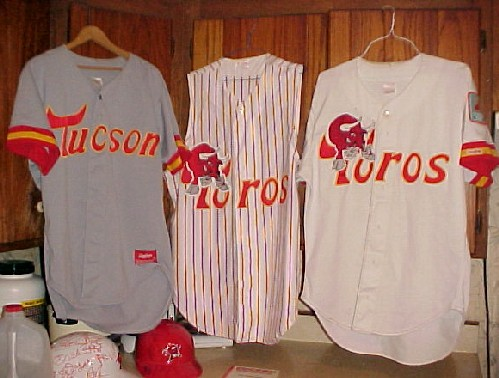
Tucson Toros jerseys from the early 1990s

The following season, 1991, was the Toros' first championship season. The team overcame a series deficit of 0–2 to sweep the Calgary Cannons in the remaining games of the best of five series. Third year Toros manager Bob Skinner was named PCL Manager of the Year, while series MVP Kenny Lofton led all of professional baseball with 17 triples for the season.

After a second-place finish in 1992, the Toros had their second and final championship season in 1993 under new manager Rick Sweet, winning both halves of the season. First baseman Jim Lindeman led the league with a .362 batting average. Second baseman James Mouton, in his first season above the single-A level, was the PCL MVP with 92 RBI and 40 stolen bases.

The Toros had the PCL's second-best overall record in 1994, and Rick Sweet was named PCL Manager of the Year. In 1995 the team had the best record in the PCL (87–56), but was defeated by the champion Colorado Springs Sky Sox in the first round of the playoffs. The 1996 campaign proved to be the Toros' last as a Houston affiliate. The team went 70–74, while "losing" a number of outstanding players, such as pitchers Donne Wall and Billy Wagner, to major league call-ups.

In addition to Lofton, Wall and Wagner the Astros-era also yielded several future MLB players including Ray Montgomery, Mike Simms, Bobby Abreu, Dave Hajek, Melvin Mora, Phil Nevin, Craig Biggio, Brian Hunter and Mike Hampton.

==== Affiliation swaps (1997) ====
1997 was the last year of the Tucson Toros, in more ways than one. Martin Stone, a businessman, land speculator and former owner of the Phoenix Firebirds, purchased the Tucson Toros from Rick Holtzman. In a "swap", the Toros' former owners moved to Fresno, California as the Grizzlies, and inherited the Firebirds' former affiliation with the San Francisco Giants, while the Phoenix AAA team moved to Tucson while retaining the Tucson club's staff and facilities.

The Toros' long affiliation with the Houston Astros was suddenly over, as the "new" Toros signed a one-year agreement with the Milwaukee Brewers. The one major league prospect with the Toros who was not part of the Brewers' organization was Travis Lee of the Arizona Diamondbacks. The new franchise did not yet have a AAA team of its own, so Lee was assigned to the nearby Tucson team for part of the season. Although Lee personally had a good year, the transitional Toros only managed a 64–78 record. It was the Tucson team's last season at Hi Corbett Field, and their last season with the Toros name.

=== Tucson Sidewinders (1998–2008) ===
After the 1997 season, the Tucson club became the top affiliate of the Diamondbacks and changed their name to the Sidewinders. With the coming of the Diamondbacks, a new ballpark was needed for spring training in Tucson, since the Colorado Rockies used Hi Corbett Field. Tucson Electric Park was built, and became the spring training site for both the Diamondbacks and the Chicago White Sox. It also became home to the Tucson Sidewinders in 1998, ending 60 years of minor-league baseball at Hi Corbett Field. The changes were not well received by fans, who responded to the new stadium, affiliation and team name with significantly reduced attendance. Financial arrangements between team owners and Pima County were also the subject of criticism, as Martin Stone persuaded the Board of Supervisors to approve a lease on Tucson Electric Park that protected the owner from a portion of the team's financial losses at taxpayer expense.

In May 1999, longtime Toros general manager Mike Feder was fired from the Sidewinders by Stone, resulting in local uproar. Feder was replaced by Jack Donovan. Following the season, broadcasting entrepreneur Jay Zucker purchased the Sidewinders, reportedly for about $7 to $8 million, after Stone was diagnosed with prostate cancer.

Tucson Baseball, LLC, the new ownership group led by Jay and Melinda Zucker, attempted to improve the situation with a variety of promotions, including weekly fireworks. These efforts met with limited success, as Zucker would lose over $200,000 in 2000, his first season as owner. Mike Feder returned as general manager, but would leave again prior to the 2001 season to take a role as Regional Marketing Director for the NFL's New Orleans Saints. Todd Woodford, a previous assistant general manager, returned to Tucson as general manager after spending a year with the PCL's Salt Lake franchise.

In 2002, Rick Parr became the team's general manager. Despite the parent club's World Series win the previous year, the Sidewinders reported 268,807 total attendance for the season, an average of just 3,895 per game (compared to Tucson Electric Park's capacity of 11,000).

The team was successful as a supplier of major league baseball level players to the Arizona Diamondbacks. Many individual Sidewinders performed admirably in mid-season call-ups, sometimes returning to the major league club time and again as needed. This earned the Sidewinders the nickname "Baby 'Backs" in 2003.

The team finished the 2006 regular season 91–53, the best in AAA baseball for 2006 and a new franchise record. Team manager Chip Hale was named PCL Manager of the Year. After defeating the Salt Lake Bees 3–1 in a best-of-five PCL Pacific Conference Championships series, the Sidewinders won the Pacific Coast League Championship Series in three straight games versus the Round Rock Express. They then defeated the International League champion, the Toledo Mud Hens, 5–2 in the Bricktown Showdown for the Triple-A baseball championship at AT&T Bricktown Ballpark in Oklahoma City. Despite this feat, the Sidewinders still suffered from dwindling fan attendance and a general lack of interest from the Tucson market. After the 2006 season, the Sidewinders renewed their player development contract with the Diamondbacks for another two years. Chip Hale was promoted to the Diamondbacks coaching staff as their new third base coach.

Bill Plummer, the former manager of the Diamondbacks' former Double-A affiliate, the Tennessee Smokies, took over as skipper for the Sidewinders in 2007. Randy Johnson pitched the home opener as part of a brief rehab stint with the Sidewinders, and picked up a win for the team in his second outing on April 20. Hampered by low attendance and concerns over the location and playing field maintenance at Tucson Electric Park, Tucson Baseball LLC would sell the Tucson Sidewinders to SK Baseball LLC for $15 million in June 2007. The sale was completed on September 12, 2007. Tucson would finish the 2007 season with a 75–67 record, the second most wins in Sidewinders history.

The Sidewinders had a win–loss record of 60–82 in 2008, their final season in Tucson, finishing in fourth (last) place in Pacific South division of the PCL. SK Baseball relocated the team to Reno, Nevada for the 2009 season, where they became the Reno Aces.

=== Return of the Toros (2009–2011) ===
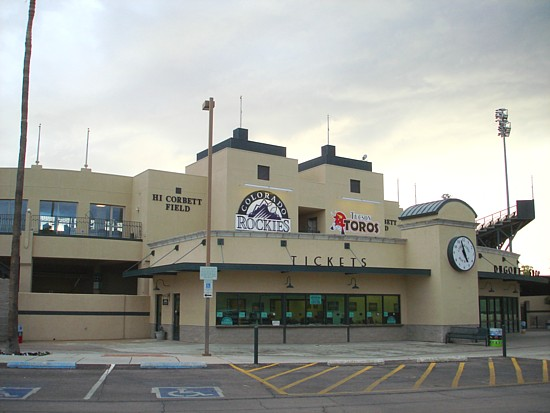
Hi Corbett as of January, 2009 sporting the new Toros logo

With the impending move of the Sidewinders (who would be renamed as the Aces) to Reno, the Reno Silver Sox of the independent Golden Baseball League were reported to be forced to leave Reno once the Sidewinders move into town. The Silver Sox franchise was sold by the league to former Sidewinders owner Tucson Baseball LLC, but the team's history (including Reno's 2006 GBL Championship) did not go with them. There were original reports of a possible relocation to Carson City, Nevada, but the team instead moved to Tucson.

On September 1, 2008, Jay Zucker of Tucson Baseball LLC and GBL chief executive officer David Kaval announced at a press conference at Hi Corbett Field in Tucson that the Tucson Toros were coming back and are now officially a part of the Golden League. Zucker owned the rights to the name, logos, colors, uniforms and history of the Toros. Though they entered the league as an expansion team, the Toros adopted the original franchise's history and records up until 1997, essentially being "resurrected." In addition to celebrating their return to professional baseball, the Toros celebrated their 40th anniversary of their formation during the 2009 season. The reconstituted Tucson Toros returned to Hi Corbett Field to begin play in 2009.

On, September 7, 2009, the Toros captured their very first GBL South Division Championship by defeating the St. George RoadRunners three games to two and advanced to the GBL Championship Series in their inaugural GBL season. They faced the North Division champion Calgary Vipers, to whom they lost three games to one in a best of five championship series.

On October 27, 2010, it was announced on the GBL website that the Toros would take 2011 off due to the Triple-A Tucson Padres playing their season at Kino Stadium (formerly Tucson Electric Park). In July 2011, the suspended franchise received an eviction notice from the city of Tucson due to reportedly defaulting on their lease at Hi Corbett Field. On July 21, the Toros announced on their website that members of the Yuma Scorpions would play as the Toros in a doubleheader and that it would be the team's final night in action. On November 29, 2011, the Toros announced that they were folding after agreeing to a settlement of $300,000 paid to the team by the city paving the way for the University of Arizona baseball team to play their home games at Hi Corbett.

==== Uniforms ====
Zucker and his wife Melinda wore classic throwback jerseys at the press conference when the initial announcement was made. However, the team would be donning new uniforms to coincide with the new updated team logo and colors of black, red and gold unveiled at the press conference. The players would sport throwback jerseys at times to pay homage to the original team.

== Major League Baseball players ==
Some notable players to don a Toros or Sidewinders uniform:

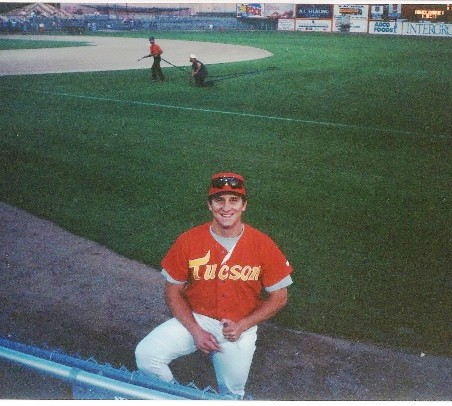
A Tucson Toros pitcher smiles for the camera, circa 1994

- Bobby Abreu
- Brian Anderson
- Ronnie Belliard
- Craig Biggio
- Ken Caminiti
- Randy Choate
- Alex Cintrón
- Craig Counsell
- David Dellucci
- Stephen Drew
- Erubiel Durazo
- Adam Dunn
- Mike Fetters
- Phil Garner
- Édgar González
- Luis Gonzalez
- Jason Grimsley
- Conor Jackson
- Geoff Jenkins
- Randy Johnson
- Todd Jones
- Jeff Juden
- Darryl Kile
- Byung-hyun Kim
- Travis Lee
- Kenny Lofton
- Leo Mazzone
- Mark McLemore
- Joe Mikulik
- Damian Miller
- Melvin Mora
- Phil Nevin
- Carlos Quentin
- Shane Reynolds
- Reggie Sanders
- Curt Schilling
- Junior Spivey
- Chad Tracy
- Dave Veres
- Óscar Villarreal
- Fernando Viña
- Billy Wagner
- Donne Wall
- Tom Wiedenbauer
- Matt Williams
- Tony Womack

At least a few of these were "Tucson" players only by virtue of being sent down to AAA for rehab after an injury.

== Notable broadcasters ==
- Mario Impemba (1991–1994) — Los Angeles Angels of Anaheim (1995–2001), Detroit Tigers (2002–2018), Boston Red Sox (2019–Present)
- Vince Cotroneo (1989–1990) — Houston Astros (1991–1997), Texas Rangers (1998–2003), Oakland Athletics (2006–present)
- Brett Dolan (2000–2005) — Montreal Expos (2003–2004, fill-in), Houston Astros (2006–2012)
- Matt Vasgersian (1996) — Milwaukee Brewers (1997–2001), San Diego Padres (2002–2008), MLB on Fox (2007–present), Thursday Night Baseball on the MLB Network (2009–present)

== Off the field ==
Some popular Toros promotions included Turn Back the Clock Night, "bull bells" and a cow-milking contest on Arizona Dairy Night, and the annual Diamond Dig in the base paths. Ray Charles also appeared in concert after a Tucson Toros game in the early 1990s. Toros broadcasters Vince Cotroneo, Mario Impemba and Matt Vasgersian all went on to major league broadcast jobs.

The Tucson Toros were featured in an episode of Highway To Heaven, titled "Popcorn, Peanuts and Cracker Jacks." Parts of the episode were filmed at Hi Corbett Field.

The team mascot, Tuffy the Toro, also appeared intermittently with the Tucson Sidewinders before being phased out. A new mascot was introduced in 1998; Sandy Sidewinder, a snake with arms.

== See also ==
- Reno Aces
- Reno Silver Sox
