= Phoenix Senators =

- 1915–1957; (1915, 1928–1932, 1947–1957); Phoenix, Arizona

Minor league affiliations
- Previous classes: Class C (1947–1957); Class D (1915, 1928–1932)
- League: Arizona–Mexico League (1955–1957)
- Previous leagues: Arizona–Texas League (1952–1954); Southwest International League (1951); Arizona–Texas League (1931–1932, 1947–1950); Arizona State League (1928–1930); Rio Grande Association (1915)

Major league affiliations
- Previous teams: Baltimore Orioles (1954–1957)

Minor league titles
- League titles: 3 (1928, 1954, 1957)

Team data
- Previous names: Phoenix Stars (1954–1957); Phoenix Senators (1915, 1928–1932, 1947–1953)
- Previous parks: Phoenix Municipal Stadium; Riverside Park

The Phoenix Senators were a minor league baseball team based in Phoenix, Arizona, USA, that played on-and-off from 1915 to 1957. They played in the Rio Grande Association in 1915, the Arizona State League from 1928 to 1930, the Arizona–Texas League from 1931 to 1950 and from 1952 to 1954, the Southwest International League in 1951 and the Arizona–Mexico League (1955–1957). Their home ballparks included Riverside Park and Phoenix Municipal Stadium.

The team became a Baltimore Orioles affiliate in 1954 and the name was changed to the Phoenix Stars. They were replaced by the AAA Phoenix Giants in 1958.

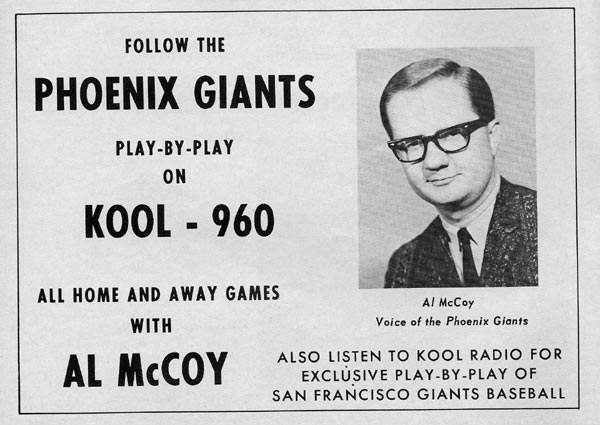
