= 1964 College Baseball All-America Team =

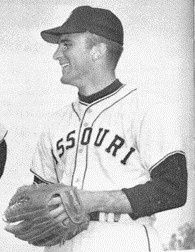
1964 All-Americans included NCAA career ERA record-holder Keith Weber.

This is a list of college baseball players named first team All-Americans for the 1964 NCAA University Division baseball season. From 1964 to 1980, there were two generally recognized All-America selectors for baseball: the American Baseball Coaches Association and The Sporting News.

== Key ==
A	American Baseball Coaches Association
S	The Sporting News
	Member of the National College Baseball Hall of Fame
	Consensus All-American – selected by both organizations
	Consensus All-American – selected by one organization

== All-Americans ==
Position	Name	School	#	A	S	Other awards and honors
Pitcher	Walt Peterson	USC	2	✓	✓	
Pitcher	Jack Stroud	Missouri	1	—	✓	
Pitcher	Keith Weber	Missouri	1	✓	—	
Catcher	Ken Suarez	Florida State	1	✓	—	
Catcher	Ron Wojciak	Minnesota	1	—	✓	
First baseman	Randy Schwartz	UCLA	2	✓	✓	
Second baseman	Al Coutts	Cal State Los Angeles	1	✓	—	
Second baseman	Jack Tracy	Seton Hall	1	—	✓	
Shortstop	Don Kessinger	Ole Miss	2	✓	✓	
Third baseman	Dave Harvey	Missouri	1	✓	—	
Third baseman	John Monteleone	Seton Hall	1	—	✓	-
Outfielder	Tom Beck	Rider	1	—	✓	
Outfielder	Bill Marovic	West Virginia	1	✓	—	
Outfielder	Rick Reichardt	Wisconsin	2	✓	✓	The Sporting News Player of the Year
Outfielder	Bill Scripture	Wake Forest	2	✓	✓	

== See also ==
- List of college baseball awards
