= Ron (given name) =

Ron (Hebrew: רוֹן) is a given name mainly used for boys. It is mostly used as a shortening of the name Ronald and Cameron, but is also Hebrew for "joy".

Notable people with this name include:

== Given name ==
=== Male ===
- Ron Atias (born 1995), Israeli taekwondo athlete
- Ron Atkinson (born 1939), Football player and manager
- Ron Baker (born 1993), American basketball player
- Ron Bass (wrestler) (1948–2017), American professional wrestler
- Ron Balicki (born 1963), American actor and stuntman
- Ron Blomberg (born 1948), American major league baseball player
- Ron Bochar, American film sound engineer
- Ron Brooks (born 1988), American football player
- Ron Bolton (American football) (born 1950), American footballer
- Ron Bolton (politician) (fl. 2022), American politician
- Ron Browz (born 1982), American record producer and rapper
- Ron Bushy (1941–2021), American drummer known for Iron Butterfly
- Ron Butlin (born 1949), Scottish poet and novelist
- Ron Butlin (ice hockey) (1925–2014), Canadian ice hockey executive
- Ron Cannan (born 1961), Canadian politician
- Ron Chernow (born 1949), American writer
- Ron Clinkscale (1933–2024), American football player
- Ron Darmon (born 1992), Israeli Olympic triathlete
- Ron Dennis (born 1947), British businessman and motorsport executive
- Ron DeSantis (born 1978), governor of Florida
- Ron Dundas (1935–1986), Canadian football player
- Ron Eaton (born 1943), American racing driver
- Ron Eldard (active 1989–2018) (born 1965), American actor
- Ron Fernandes (1951–2023), American football player
- Ron Francis (born 1963), Canadian hockey player
- Ron Gardenhire (born 1957), American baseball player and manager
- Ron Gautsche (1935–2024), American racing driver
- Ron Gillham, American politician
- Ron Greenwood (1921–2006), English footballer and manager
- Ron Guidry (born 1950), American baseball player and coach
- Ron Hackenberger (born 1935 or 1936), American businessman
- Ron Hopkins (born 1960), American football player
- Ron Horsley (born 1977), American writer and artist
- Ron Howard (born 1954), American actor and director
- L. Ron Hubbard (1911–1986), American writer and Scientology founder
- Ron Jeremy (born 1953), American pornographic actor
- Ron Johnson (born 1955), American politician
- Ron Jones (sprinter) (1934–2021), British sprinter
- Ron Kaplan (born 1970), Israeli Olympic gymnast
- Ron Karabatsos (1933–2012), American actor and police detective
- Ron Keel (born 1961), American heavy metal singer
- Ron Keselowski (born 1946), American NASCAR Cup Series driver
- Ron Killings (born 1972), American professional wrestler known under the ring name R-Truth
- Ron Kind (born 1963), American politician and lawyer
- Ron McClure (born 1941), American jazz bassist
- Ron LeFlore (born 1948), American baseball player
- Ron Mael (born 1945), American musician and co-founder of the band Sparks
- Ron McNair (1950–1986), American astronaut who died during the launch of the Space Shuttle Challenger
- Ron Merk, American independent filmmaker
- Ron Mix (born 1938), American All-Pro Hall of Fame football player
- Ron Ng (born 1979), Hong Kong actor
- Ron Pardo (born 1967), Canadian actor and comedian
- Ron Ormond (1910–1981), American filmmaker and showman
- Ron Paul (born 1935), American politician
- Ron Perlman (born 1950), American actor
- Ron Petersen (born 1934), American mycologist
- Ron Reeves (born 1938), Australian rules footballer
- Ron Reeves (gridiron football) (born 1960), American football player
- Ron Reagan (born 1958), American former radio host, political analyst, and son of Ronald Reagan
- Ron Rivera (born 1962), American football player and coach
- Ron Rivest (born 1947), American cryptographer
- Ron Robin (born 1951), Israeli historian and President of the University of Haifa
- Ron Rubin (voice actor) (born 1959), Canadian voice actor
- Ron Rubin (bridge player) (born 1948), American bridge player
- Ron Santo (1940–2010), American baseball player
- Ron Sao, Australian politician
- Ron Saunders (1932–2019), English footballer and manager
- Ron Saunders (politician) (born 1954), American politician
- Ron Shumon (born 1955), American football player
- Ron Stern (born 1967), Canadian ice hockey player
- Ron Torten (born 1966), Israeli Olympic competitive sailor
- Ron Underwood (born 1953), American film and television director
- Ron Vaudry, Canadian comedian
- Ron Vlaar (born 1985), Dutch football (soccer) player
- Ron Wagner (born 1961), American comics artist
- Ron Waksman, American cardiologist
- Ron Walden (1907–1985), Australian rugby union player
- Ron Waldron (born 1933), Wales international rugby union player
- Ron Walker (businessman) (1939–2018), Australian businessman
- Ron Walker (English footballer) (1932–2017), English footballer
- Ron Walker (Australian footballer) (1927–2005), Australian rules footballer
- Ron Wallace (singer), American singer-songwriter
- Ron Waller (1933–2018), American football player and coach
- Ron Wallwork (born 1941), British athlete
- Ron Walotsky (1943–2002), American artist
- Ron Walsh (born 1932), Australian rules footballer
- Ron Walters (1938–2010), Author and scholar
- Ron Walters (ice hockey) (born 1948), Canadian ice hockey player
- Ron Walters (politician) (born 1950), American politician
- Ron Walters (luger) (born 1943), American luger
- Ron Walters (make-up artist) (1938–1994), American make-up artist
- Ron Waples (born 1944), Canadian harness racer
- Ron Ward (ice hockey) (born 1944), Canadian ice hockey player
- Ron Ward (cricketer) (1905–2000), Australian cricketer
- Ron Ward (footballer) (1932–2010), English footballer
- Ron Ward (rugby union) (1915–2000), New Zealand rugby union player
- Ron Warhurst (born 1942), American sports coach and Purple Heart recipient
- Ron Warner (gridiron football) (born 1975), American football player
- Ron Warner (baseball) (born 1968), American baseball coach
- Ron Warren (1928–2024), Australian rules footballer
- Ron Warzeka (1935–2017), American football player
- Ron Washington (born 1952), American baseball player, coach, and manager
- Ron Wasserman (born 1961), American singer-songwriter
- Ron Waterman (born 1965), American mixed martial artist and professional wrestler
- Ron Watkins (born 1987), American conspiracy theorist and imageboard administrator
- Ron Watson (sailor) (born 1937), New Zealand sailor
- Ron Watson (rugby league) (1929–2004), Australian rugby league footballer and coach
- Ron Watson (politician) (born 1966), American politician
- Ron Watt (born 1963), Australian rules footballer
- Ron Watton (born c. 1932), Canadian football player
- Ron Watts (1943–2022), NBA basketball player
- Ron Weaver (TV producer) (1937–2013)
- Ron Weaver (American football), American fraudster and football player
- Ron Weaver (mayor), American attorney and politician
- Ron Weber (born 1933), Sports radio announcer
- Ron Webster (born 1943), English footballer
- Ron Weidberg (born 1953), Israeli composer
- Ron Weighell (1950–2020), British short-story writer
- Ron Weinberg, American politician
- Ron Weiner, American television writer
- Ron Weissenhofer (born 1964), American football player
- Ron Welch (born 1960), United States Army general
- Ron Wells (politician) (1935–2024), Australian politician
- Ron Wells (American football) (born 1961), American football player
- Ron Welty (born 1971), American drummer
- Ron Westerby (1920–1997), New Zealand international rugby league footballer
- Ron Weston (born 1948), American politician
- Ron Westray (born 1970), American jazz trombonist, composer, and educator
- Ron Westrum (born 1945), American sociologist
- Ron Wetzel (Australian footballer) (born 1947), Australian rules footballer
- Ron Wetzel (American football) (born 1960), American football player
- Ron Weyman (1915–2007), British-Canadian film and television director
- Ron Wheatley (1924–2003), English footballer
- Ron Wheeler (born 1958), American football player
- Ron White (born 1956), American comedian
- Ron White (actor) (1953–2018), Canadian actor
- Ron White (footballer) (1920–1992), Australian rules footballer
- Ron Whitehead, American poet
- Ron Whitney (born 1942), American hurdler and sprinter
- Ron Whittaker (born 1971), American golfer
- Ron Whyte (1941–1989), American dramatist
- Ron Wicks (1939–2016), Canadian ice hockey official
- Ron Widby (1945–2020), American football and basketball player
- Ron Wiebe, Canadian politician from Alberta
- Ron Wieck (born 1944), American politician
- Ron Wigg (1949–1997), English footballer
- Ron Wigginton (born 1944), American artist and landscape architect
- Ron Wileman (1954–2009), English rugby league player
- Ron Wilke (1927–2015), South African sprinter
- Ron Willems (born 1966), Dutch footballer
- Ron Willett (born 1944), English rugby league footballer
- Ron Willey (1929–2004), Australian RL coach and former Australia international rugby league footballer
- Ron Williams (born 1949), American businessperson
- Ron Williams (basketball) (1944–2004), American basketball player
- Ron Williams (rugby union) (born 1963), New Zealand rugby union player
- Ron Williams (footballer) (1917–1987), Australian rules footballer
- Ron Williamson (1953–2004), American baseball player wrongly convicted of murder
- Ron Willis (1943–1977), American baseball player
- Ron Willis (footballer) (born 1947), English footballer
- Ron Wilson (ice hockey, born 1955), Canadian-American ice hockey coach
- Ron Wilson (ice hockey, born 1956), Canadian ice hockey player and coach
- Ron Wilson (newsreader) (born 1952), Australian television/radio presenter
- Ron Wilson (artist), American comics artist
- Ron Wilson (footballer, born 1941) (1941–2001), Scottish footballer
- Ron Wilson (magician) (1926–2010), Scottish-born magician
- Ron Wilson (Clear Channel radio host), American talk radio host
- Ron Wilson (American politician) (born 1943), American politician, convicted of fraud
- Ron Wilson (drummer) (1944–1989), American musician
- Ron Wilson (Australian politician) (born 1958), Australian politician
- Ron Wilson (Australian footballer) (1915–1984), Australian rules footballer
- Ron Wilson (rugby union) (born 1954), Scottish rugby union player
- Ron Wilson (CBC radio host) (born 1958), Canadian television journalist
- Ron Wilson (footballer, born 1924) (1924–2007), English footballer
- Ron Winter (born 1946), American football official
- Ron Wise, Australian businessman and entrepreneur
- Ron Withell (1916–1998), New Zealand amateur boxer
- Ron Withem (1946–2020), American politician
- Ron Withnall (1914–1990), Australian politician and lawyer
- Ron Witmeyer (born 1967), American baseball player
- Ron Wojciak (1943–1966), American baseball player
- Ron Wolf (born 1938), American football general manager
- Ron Wolfley (born 1962), American football player
- Ron Wood (Australian footballer) (1923–1978), Australian rules footballer
- Ron Wood (footballer, born 1925) (1925–2012), English footballer
- Ron Woodley (1925–2017), Archdeacon of Cleveland
- Ron Woodroof (1950–1992), American entrepreneur
- Ron Woods (born 1943), American baseball player
- Ron Wooten (born 1959), American football player
- Ron Workman (born 1939), Australian rugby league footballer
- Ron Worley, American politician
- Ron Wotus (born 1961), American baseball player and coach
- Ron Wright (wrestler) (1938–2015), American professional wrestler
- Ron Wright (politician) (1953–2021), American politician
- Ron Wright (umpire) (1913–1968), Australian cricket umpire
- Ron Wright (baseball) (born 1976), American baseball player
- Ron Wright (footballer) (1929–2001), Australian rules footballer
- Ron Wyatt (1933–1999), American creationist
- Ron Wyden (born 1949), American politician
- Ron Wylie (1933–2020), Scottish footballer
- Ron Wynn, American music critic
- Ron Wynn (footballer) (1923–1983), Welsh footballer

=== Female ===
- Ron Monroe (born 1995), Chinese actress and singer
- Ron Ponte (born 1988), Israeli former volleyball player

== Middle name ==
=== Male ===
- Ryohei Ron Tsutsui (born 1977), Japanese film producer
- Yiftah Ron-Tal (born 1956), Israeli businessman and former major general

=== Female ===
- Galila Ron-Feder Amit (born 1949), Israeli children books author
- Yael Ron Ben-Moshe (born 1978), Israeli politician

== Fictional characters ==
- Ron (King of Fighters), in the video game
- Big Ron (EastEnders), in the TV soap opera
- Ron Burgundy, in films Anchorman: The Legend of Ron Burgundy and Anchorman 2: The Legend Continues
- Ron Kamonohashi: Deranged Detective, a manga series
- Ron Stoppable, in animated series Kim Possible
- Ron Swanson, in the sitcom Parks and Recreation
- Ron Troupe, in comic books by DC Comics
- Ron Weasley, in Harry Potter
- Ron Staedtler in Netflix's Inside Job

== See also ==
- Ron (disambiguation)
- Ron (surname)
- Ronald
