= 1964 NCAA University Division baseball rankings =

1964 NCAA University Division baseball season

Tournament

College World Series
- Champions: Minnesota
- Runners-up: Missouri
- MOP: Joe Ferris (Maine)

Seasons
- ← 1963 1965 →

The following poll makes up the 1964 NCAA University Division baseball rankings. Collegiate Baseball Newspaper published its first human poll of the top 20 teams in college baseball in 1957, and expanded to rank the top 30 teams in 1961.

== Collegiate Baseball ==
Currently, only the final poll from the 1964 season is available.

| Rank | Team |
|---|---|
| 1 | Minnesota |
| 2 | Missouri |
| 3 | Maine |
| 4 | USC |
| 5 | Arizona State |
| 6 | Seton Hall |
| 7 | Ole Miss |
| 8 | Texas A&M |
| 9 | Oregon |
| 10 | Santa Clara |
| 11 | North Carolina |
| 12 | Texas |
| 13 | Auburn |
| 14 | Wake Forest |
| 15 | West Virginia |
| 16 | Kent State |
| 17 | Western Michigan |
| 18 | Cal Poly Pomona |
| 19 | UCLA |
| 20 | Arizona |
| 21 | Washington State |
| 22 | Oregon State |
| 23 | East Carolina |
| 24 | Air Force |
| 25 | Michigan State |
| 26 | Baylor |
| 27 | Harvard |
| 28 | St. John's |
| 29 | Ithaca |
| 30 | Sacramento State |
