= Minnesota Golden Gophers baseball =

Baseball team of the University of Minnesota

Minnesota Golden Gophers
- 2026 Minnesota Golden Gophers baseball team
- Founded: 1876
- University: University of Minnesota
- Head coach: Ty McDevitt (2nd season)
- Conference: Big Ten
- Location: Minneapolis, Minnesota
- Home stadium: Siebert Field (primary); U.S. Bank Stadium (secondary) (capacity: 1,420 (Siebert))
- Nickname: Golden Gophers
- Colors: Maroon and gold

College World Series champions
- 1956, 1960, 1964

College World Series appearances
- 1956, 1960, 1964, 1973, 1977

NCAA regional champions
- 1977, 2018

NCAA tournament appearances
- 1956, 1958, 1959, 1960, 1964, 1968, 1969, 1970, 1973, 1974, 1976, 1977, 1981, 1982, 1985, 1987, 1988, 1991, 1992, 1993, 1994, 1998, 1999, 2000, 2001, 2003, 2004, 2007, 2009, 2010, 2016, 2018

Conference tournament champions
- 1982, 1985, 1988, 1992, 1998, 2001, 2004, 2010, 2018

Conference regular season champions
- 1933, 1935, 1956, 1958, 1959, 1960, 1964, 1968, 1969, 1970, 1973, 1974, 1977, 1982, 1985, 1988, 1992, 2000, 2002, 2003, 2004, 2010, 2016, 2018

For information on all University of Minnesota sports, see Minnesota Golden Gophers

The Minnesota Golden Gophers baseball team is the varsity intercollegiate athletic team of the University of Minnesota in Minneapolis, Minnesota, United States. The team competes in the National Collegiate Athletic Association's Division I and are members of the Big Ten Conference.

== Home stadiums ==
=== Siebert Field ===
Siebert Field is the home baseball park for the Golden Gophers. The Old Siebert Field hosted its first game on April 23, 1971 – a 2–1 Gopher victory over Creighton. On June 11, 2012, Old Siebert Field was demolished to begin construction on the new Seibert Field. The new Siebert Field hosted its first game on April 5, 2013, which the Gophers won 7–0 over Ohio State.

=== U.S. Bank Stadium ===
U.S. Bank Stadium is the alternate stadium for the Golden Gophers. First used for baseball in 2017, it is primarily used for February and March games, including non-conference home games including a major pre-conference season tournament featuring top teams from major conferences. Like its predecessor, the Hubert H. Humphrey Metrodome, on the same site, the indoor venue allowed the team to play home games when most cold-weather teams had to play road games, and allows for additional home games for the team, a huge advantage in the Big Ten conference. Roughly 40% of home games are played at U. S. Bank Stadium.

== Year-by-year results ==
Season	Coach	Record		Notes				
Season	Coach	Overall	Big Ten	Notes				
1876	Unknown	0–1	—					
1877	No Team							
1878	Unknown	2–1	—					
1879	No Team							
1880	Unknown	0–1	—					
1881	No Team							
1882	No Team							
1883	Phillip Brauer	2–1	—					
1884	Phillip Brauer	2–1	—					
1885	Phillip Brauer	3–1–1	—					
1886	Phillip Brauer	2–0	—					
1887	Phillip Brauer	1–2–1	—					
1888	Phillip Brauer	0–1	—					
1889	Phillip Brauer	2–1	—					
1890	Phillip Brauer	1–1	—					
1891	Phillip Brauer	5–3	—					
1892	Phillip Brauer	3–4	1–2					
1893	Phillip Brauer	3–5	3–3					
1894	Phillip Brauer	9–5	0–2					
1895	Phillip Brauer	2–2	0–1					
1896	Phillip Brauer	1–2	—					
1897	Phillip Brauer	2–2	—					
1898	Phillip Brauer	3–2	—					
1899	Phillip Brauer	8–5	—					
1900	Phillip Brauer	17–11–1	4–3					
1901	Phillip Brauer	22–7–1	4–3					
1902	Phillip Brauer	13–10	3–2					
1903	No Team							
1904	Unknown	10–9	0–5					
1905	No Team							
1906	Unknown	10–10	3–3					
1907	Unknown	16–6	3–1					
1908	Walter Wilmot	17–5–1	6–2					
1909	Walter Wilmot	9–7–2	0–5					
1910	Walter Wilmot & Perry Werden	10–9	3–5					
1911	Wilkie Clarke	13–7–1	4–4					
1912	No Team							
1913	Dr. Denny Sullivan	9–5–3	3–3					
1914	Dr. Denny Sullivan	10–9	4–6					
1915	Frosty Thomas	13–6	3–6					
1916	No Team							
1917	No Team							
1918	No Team							
1919	No Team							
1920	No Team							
1921	No Team							
1922	Bee Lawler & Russ Ford	6–11	2–6					
1923	Lee Watrous, Jr.	4–11	3–7					
1924	Lee Watrous, Jr.	12–9	5–3					
1925	Lee Watrous, Jr.	11–9	6–6					
1926	Lee Watrous, Jr.	5–10	3–5					
1927	George Clark	5–8–1	3–4					
1928	Dutch Bergman	3–12–1	2–9					
1929	Dutch Bergman	6–11	4–7					
1930	Dutch Bergman	17–12	4–6					
1931	Frank McCormick	11–11	2–7					
1932	Frank McCormick	9–9	5–5					
1933	Frank McCormick	12–2	6–1	Big Ten Champions				
1934	Frank McCormick	7–9	4–8					
1935	Frank McCormick	17–13	8–3	Big Ten Champions				
1936	Frank McCormick	17–7	7–4					
1937	Frank McCormick	11–9	6–5					
1938	Frank McCormick	11–11	4–7					
1939	Frank McCormick	16–13	7–5					
1940	Frank McCormick	15–6	6–4					
1941	Frank McCormick	14–9	7–5					
1942	Dave MacMillan	11–10	5–7					
1943	Dave MacMillan	14–3–1	7–3					
1944	Dave MacMillan	13–5	5–3					
1945	Dave MacMillan	10–4	4–4					
1946	Dave MacMillan	14–5	6–4					
1947	Dave MacMillan	4–9	2–9					
1948	Dick Siebert	14–12	4–8					
1949	Dick Siebert	14–15–1	4–7–1					
1950	Dick Siebert	11–17	1–8					
1951	Dick Siebert	15–10	6–6					
1952	Dick Siebert	17–15	7–7					
1953	Dick Siebert	19–9	7–5					
1954	Dick Siebert	17–14	6–9					
1955	Dick Siebert	23–9	10–5					
1956	Dick Siebert	33–9	11–2	Big Ten Champions, College World Series Champions				
1957	Dick Siebert	16–8–2	6–5					
1958	Dick Siebert	26–7	11–3	Big Ten Champions, NCAA Regional				
1959	Dick Siebert	22–8	10–2	Big Ten Champions, NCAA Regional				
1960	Dick Siebert	34–7–1	12–2–1	Big Ten Champions, College World Series Champions				
1961	Dick Siebert	21–9	12–3					
1962	Dick Siebert	14–16	3–10					
1963	Dick Siebert	24–11	9–6					
1964	Dick Siebert	31–12	11–3	Big Ten Champions, College World Series Champions				
1965	Dick Siebert	17–11	5–7					
1966	Dick Siebert	27–10–2	11–2–1					
1967	Dick Siebert	32–10	12–5					
1968	Dick Siebert	35–9	14–2	Big Ten Champions, NCAA Regional				
1969	Dick Siebert	36–12	15–3	Big Ten Champions, NCAA Regional				
1970	Dick Siebert	34–16	15–3	Big Ten Champions, NCAA Regional				
1971	Dick Siebert	28–13	12–6					
1972	Dick Siebert	15–13	9–5					
1973	Dick Siebert	25–13	11–5	Big Ten Champions, College World Series				
1974	Dick Siebert	25–13	11–5	Big Ten Champions, NCAA Regional				
1975	Dick Siebert	20–11	13–40					
1976	Dick Siebert	38–11	12–6	NCAA Regional				
1977	Dick Siebert	39–12	15–3	Big Ten Champions, College World Series				
1978	Dick Siebert	25–17	7–7					
1979	George Thomas	25–14	12–6					
1980	George Thomas	33–13	14–4					
1981	George Thomas	37–16	13–3	Big Ten West Division Champions, NCAA Regional				
1982	John Anderson	33–22–1	8–8	Big Ten Tournament champions, NCAA Regional				
1983	John Anderson	27–21	12–2	Big Ten West Division Champions				
1984	John Anderson	31–20	11–5	Big Ten West Division Champions				
1985	John Anderson	33–23	9–7	Big Ten Tournament champions, NCAA Regional				
1986	John Anderson	40–19	10–5	Big Ten West Division Champions				
1987	John Anderson	36–25	12–4	Big Ten West Division Champions, NCAA Regional				
1988	John Anderson	38–28	17–11	Big Ten Tournament champions, NCAA Regional				
1989	John Anderson	31–22–1	15–12					
1990	John Anderson	36–24–1	19–9					
1991	John Anderson	37–27	18–10	NCAA Regional				
1992	John Anderson	42–21	18–10	Big Ten Tournament champions, NCAA Regional				
1993	John Anderson	43–18	17–9	NCAA Regional				
1994	John Anderson	42–21	21–7	NCAA Regional				
1995	John Anderson	31–28	16–12					
1996	John Anderson	30–26	15–12					
1997	John Anderson	30–24	15–10					
1998	John Anderson	45–15	19–9	Big Ten Tournament champions, NCAA Regional				
1999	John Anderson	46–18	21–7	NCAA Regional				
2000	John Anderson	38–24	20–8	Big Ten Champions, NCAA Regional				
2001	John Anderson	39–21	19–8	Big Ten Tournament champions, NCAA Regional				
2002	John Anderson	32–26	18–10	Big Ten Champions				
2003	John Anderson	40–22	24–6	Big Ten Champions, NCAA Regional				
2004	John Anderson	38–23	21–10	Big Ten Champions, Big Ten Tournament champions, NCAA Regional				
2005	John Anderson	33–29	17–15					
2006	John Anderson	34–26	17–14					
2007	John Anderson	41–18	18–9	NCAA Regional				
2008	John Anderson	20–35	10–21					
2009	John Anderson	40–19	17–6	NCAA Regional				
2010	John Anderson	32–30	15–9	Big Ten Champions, Big Ten Tournament champions, NCAA Regional				
2011	John Anderson	25–24	13–11					
2012	John Anderson	29–27	11–13					
2013	John Anderson	32–22	13–8					
2014	John Anderson	27–24	13–11					
2015	John Anderson	21–30	9–15					
2016	John Anderson	34–20	16–7	Big Ten Champions, NCAA Regional				
2017	John Anderson	36–21	15–8					
2018	John Anderson	41–13	18–4	Big Ten Champions, Big Ten Tournament champions, NCAA Regional, NCAA Super Regional				
2019	John Anderson	29–27	15–8					
2020	John Anderson	8–10	0–0	Season canceled due to COVID-19 pandemic				
2021	John Anderson	6–31	6–31	Big Ten opponents only due to COVID-19 pandemic				
2022	John Anderson	16–36	6–18					
2023	John Anderson	18–34	10–14					
2024	John Anderson	25–23	11–13		2025	Ty McDevitt	24-28	10-20

== Individual awards ==
=== All Americans ===
- 1952

Gene Elder, 2B
Paul Giel, P

- 1953

Paul Giel, P

- 1954

Paul Giel, P

- 1956

Jerry Kindall, SS
Jerry Thomas, P

- 1958

Jack McCartan, OF

- 1959

Ron Causton, OF

- 1960

Larry Bertelsen, P
Wayne Knapp, P

- 1961

Larry Bertelsen, P
Wayne Knapp, P

- 1963

Jon Andresen

- 1964

Ron Wojciak, C

- 1967

Dennis Zacho, 1B

- 1969

Noel Jenke, OF
Mike Walseth, 1B

- 1973

Dave Winfield, P

- 1976

Paul Molitor, SS

- 1977

Paul Molitor, SS
Dan Morgan, P

- 1982

Greg Olson, C

- 1990

Brian Raabe, 2B
Dan Wilson, C

- 1991

Brent Gates, SS

- 1992

Mark Merila, 2B

- 1993

Mark Merila, 2B

- 1994

Mark Merila, 2B

- 1995

Shane Gunderson, C

- 1998

Robb Quinlan, 1B

- 1999

Robb Quinlan, 1B

- 2001

Jack Hanahan, OF

- 2002

Luke Appert, 2B

- 2003

Luke Appert, 2B
Glen Perkins, P

- 2004

Glen Perkins, P

- 2009

Derek McCallum, 2B

=== College World Series ===
==== College World Series Most Outstanding Player Award ====
Jerry Thomas, P, 1956
John Erickson, 2B – 1960
Dave Winfield, OF/P – 1973

==== All College World Series ====
- 1960

John Erickson, 2B
Carl Rolloff, 3B
Dave Pflepsen, SS
Bob Wasko, P

- 1964

Bill Davis, 1B
Dewey Markus, 2B
Dan Hoffman, OF
Ron Wojciak, C
Joe Pollack, P

- 1973

Dave Winfield, P

=== Conference Awards ===
- Big Ten Player of the Year

Terry Steinbach – 1983
Brent Gates, SS – 1991
Mark Merila, 2B – 1994
Shane Gunderson, P – 1995
Robb Quinlan, 1B – 1999
Jack Hannahan, 3B – 2001
Luke Appert, 2B – 2002, 2003
Matt Fiedler, P/OF - 2016

- Big Ten Coach of the Year

John Anderson – 1982, 2000, 2002, 2003, 2004, 2010, 2016

- Big Ten Pitcher of the Year

C.J. Woodrow – 2002
Glen Perkins – 2004

- Big Ten Freshman of the Year

Dan Wilson, C – 1998
Mark Merila, 2B – 1991
Glen Perkins, P – 2003

- Big Ten Tournament Most Valuable Player

Terry Steinbach, C – 1982
Jon Beckman, OF – 1985
Tim McIntosh, OF – 1986
Vince Palyan, OF – 1988
Scott Bakkum, P – 1992
Shane Gunderson, P – 1995
Mark Groebner, OF – 1998
Jack Hannahan, 3B – 2001
Glen Perkins, P – 2004
Kyle Knudson, C – 2010

== Current and former major league players ==
- Frank Brosseau
- Jim Brower
- Fred Bruckbauer
- J.T. Bruett
- Ralph Capron
- Steve Comer
- Bill Davis
- Cole De Vries
- Brian Denman
- Heinie Elder
- Harry Elliott
- Bobby Fenwick
- Brent Gates
- John Gaub
- Paul Giel
- Jack Hannahan
- Bryan Hickerson
- Jerry Kindall
- Kerry Ligtenberg
- Tim McIntosh
- Ben Meyer
- Max Meyer
- Paul Molitor
- Denny Neagle
- Greg Olson
- Glen Perkins
- Robb Quinlan
- Brian Raabe
- Mike Sadek
- Jeff Schmidt
- Terry Steinbach
- George Thomas
- Jerry Ujdur
- Terrin Vavra
- Dan Wilson
- Dave Winfield

Source: Baseball Reference
