= Ron =

Ron or RON may refer to:

== Language ==
- Ron language, spoken in Plat State, Nigeria
- Romanian language, ISO 639-3 language code ron

== People ==
- Ron (given name), including a list of people and fictional characters with the name
- Ron (singer) (Rosalino Cellamare, born 1953), Italian singer
- Ron (surname), including a list of people with the name

== Places ==
- Ron, Karnataka, India
- Røn, Vestre Slidre, Norway

== Science and technology ==
- Gyrodyne RON Rotorcycle, mid-1950s US helicopter
- Remote online notarization
- Research Octane Number, a type of fuel octane rating
- Resilient Overlay Network, an Internet application architecture

== Other uses ==
- "Ron", a song by Slint from the 1989 album Tweez
- Cyclone Ron, in the South Pacific in 1998
- Rhongomiant, or Ron, King Arthur's lance
- Romanian leu, the currency of Romania, ISO 4217 code RON
- "Re-open nominations", a ballot option that functions like "none of the above"
- Rota Osobogo Naznacheniya (рота особого назначения), a 1940s unit of Russian commando frogmen

== See also ==
- Big Ron (disambiguation)
- Ronn (disambiguation)
