= 1964 Maine Black Bears baseball team =

1964 Maine Black Bears baseball

Yankee Conference Champion NCAA District 1 playoff champion

College World Series, 3–2
- Conference: Yankee Conference
- Record: 21–8 (8–2 Yankee)
- Head coach: Jack Butterfield (8th season)

1964 Yankee Conference baseball standings
	Conf.						Overall
Team	W		L		T	PCT	W		L		T	PCT
No. 3 Maine ‍†‍‍^{y}	8	–	2	–	0	.800	21	–	8	–	0	.724
Vermont ‍‍‍	6	–	4	–	0	.600		–		–		–
Rhode Island ‍‍‍	5	–	5	–	0	.500	5	–	13	–	0	.278
New Hampshire ‍‍‍	4	–	6	–	0	.400	6	–	10	–	0	.375
UMass ‍‍‍	3	–	6	–	1	.350	7	–	10	–	1	.417
Connecticut ‍‍‍	3	–	6	–	1	.350	8	–	12	–	1	.405
† – Conference champion y – Invited to the NCAA tournament As of June 30, 1964; Rankings from Collegiate Baseball

The 1964 Maine Black Bears baseball team represented the University of Maine in the 1964 NCAA University Division baseball season. The Black Bears were led by Jack Butterfield in his 8th year as head coach, and played as part of the Yankee Conference.

Maine posted a 21–8 record, earned the Yankee Conference championship with a 8–2 regular season to claim the automatic bid to the 1964 NCAA University Division baseball tournament. They won the District 1 playoff against Northeastern to advance to the 1964 College World Series , their first appearance in the ultimate college baseball event. The Black Bears won games against Seton Hall, Arizona State, and semifinalist USC and lost games to eventual champion Minnesota and runner-up Missouri. Butterfield was named NCAA Coach of the Year by the American Baseball Coaches Association.

== Personnel ==
=== Roster ===
1964 Maine Black Bears roster
Pitchers: 10 - Dick Dolloff - Senior; 11 - Tom Murphy - Junior; 12 - Art Heathcote - Sophomore; 15 - Ray Bisbee - Junior; 16 - Bruce Cary - Sophomore; 24 - Charles Newell - Sophomore; 29 - Joe Ferris - Sophomore; 35 - Dick Flaherty - Junior; 36 - Roger Richards - Junior	Catchers: 22 - Carl Merrill - Sophomore; 25 - Doug Swain - Sophomore; Infielders: 4 - Dick Perkins - Sophomore; 6 - Vic Nelson - Junior; 7 - Mike DeSisto - Junior; 8 - Dick DeVarney - Sophomore; 14 - Dave Thompson - Senior; 19 - John Gillette - Junior	Outfielders: 9 - Brent Keene - Junior; 17 - Larry Coughlin - Junior; 23 - Ron Lanza - Sophomore; 27 - Dick Kelliher - Sophomore; 34 - John Hutchins - Sophomore; 37 - Steve Sones - Sophomore

==== Coaches ====
1964 Maine Black Bears baseball coaching staff
- Jack Butterfield - Head coach - 8th season
- Woody Carville - Assistant coach - 4th season

== Schedule ==
1964 Maine Black Bears baseball game log
Regular season

March
Date	Opponent	Site/stadium	Score	Overall record	YC record
	Villanova*		W 6–3	1–0	
Mar 29	vs Dartmouth*	College Park, MD	W 12–7	2–0	
	at Hampton Institute*	Hampton, VA	W 9–1	3–0	
Mar 31	at Virginia Tech*	Tech Park • Blacksburg, VA	L 4–10	3–1	

April/May
Date	Opponent	Site/stadium	Score	Overall record	YC record
	vs Bridgewater*		W 7–2	4–1	
	at Towson*	Towson, MD	W 7–3	5–1	
Apr 4	Columbia*	Baker Field • New York, NY	W 7–1	6–1	
Apr 24	at Connecticut	Gardner Dow Athletic Fields • Storrs, CT	W 5–3	7–1	1–0
Apr 25	at Connecticut	Gardner Dow Athletic Fields • Storrs, CT	W 5–4	8–1	2–0
	Bates*		W 8–2	9–1	
	Bowdoin*		L 1–4	9–2	
	Rhode Island		W 12–4	10–2	3–0
	Rhode Island		L 9–10	10–3	3–1
	Colby*		L 4–7	10–4	
	UMass		W 9–6	11–4	4–1
	UMass		W 16–7	12–4	5–1
	New Hampshire		W 5–0	13–4	6–1
	New Hampshire		L 0–4	13–5	6–2
	Vermont		W 3–1	14–5	7–2
	Vermont		W 7–5	15–5	8–2
	Colby*		W 6–4	16–5	

Postseason

NCAA District 1 Playoffs
Date	Opponent	Site/stadium	Score	Overall record	NCAAT record
	Northeastern	Parsons Field • Brookline, MA	W 9–5	17–5	1–0
	Northeastern	Parsons Field • Brookline, MA	W 4–2	18–5	2–0

College World Series
Date	Opponent	Site/stadium	Score	Overall record	CWS record
June 8	Seton Hall	Johnny Rosenblatt Stadium • Omaha, NE	L 1–5	18–7	0–1
June 12	Minnesota	Johnny Rosenblatt Stadium • Omaha, NE	W 12–0	19–7	1–1
June 13	Arizona State	Johnny Rosenblatt Stadium • Omaha, NE	W 4–2	20–7	2–1
June 15	USC	Johnny Rosenblatt Stadium • Omaha, NE	W 2–1	21–7	3–1
June 17	Missouri	Johnny Rosenblatt Stadium • Omaha, NE	L 1–2	21–8	3–2
