= Liat (disambiguation) =

Liat Air, usually referred to as LIAT, is an airline operating out of Antigua and Barbuda. Liat may also refer to:

== People ==
- Liat Atzili, Israeli kidnapping victim in Holding Liat (2025) film
- Liat Ben-Moshe, American professor of criminology, and disability scholar
- Liat Ben-Ari, Israeli Deputy State Attorney of Israel
- Liat Cohen (born 1971), Israeli-born French classical guitarist
- Liat Gabai, victim of the Afula axe attack (1994)
- Liat Haninowitz, Israeli rhythmic gymnast
- Liat Har Lev, Israeli actress
- Liat Ron, Israeli actress
- Liat Wexelman, Israeli diplomat
- Liat Yossifor (born 1974), Israeli-born American painter

== Others ==
- Liat Island, a small Indonesian island
- Liat Towers, a shopping mall in Singapore
- LIAT (1974), history of Liat Air before 2024
