= Amos Nur =

American geophysicist (1938–2024)

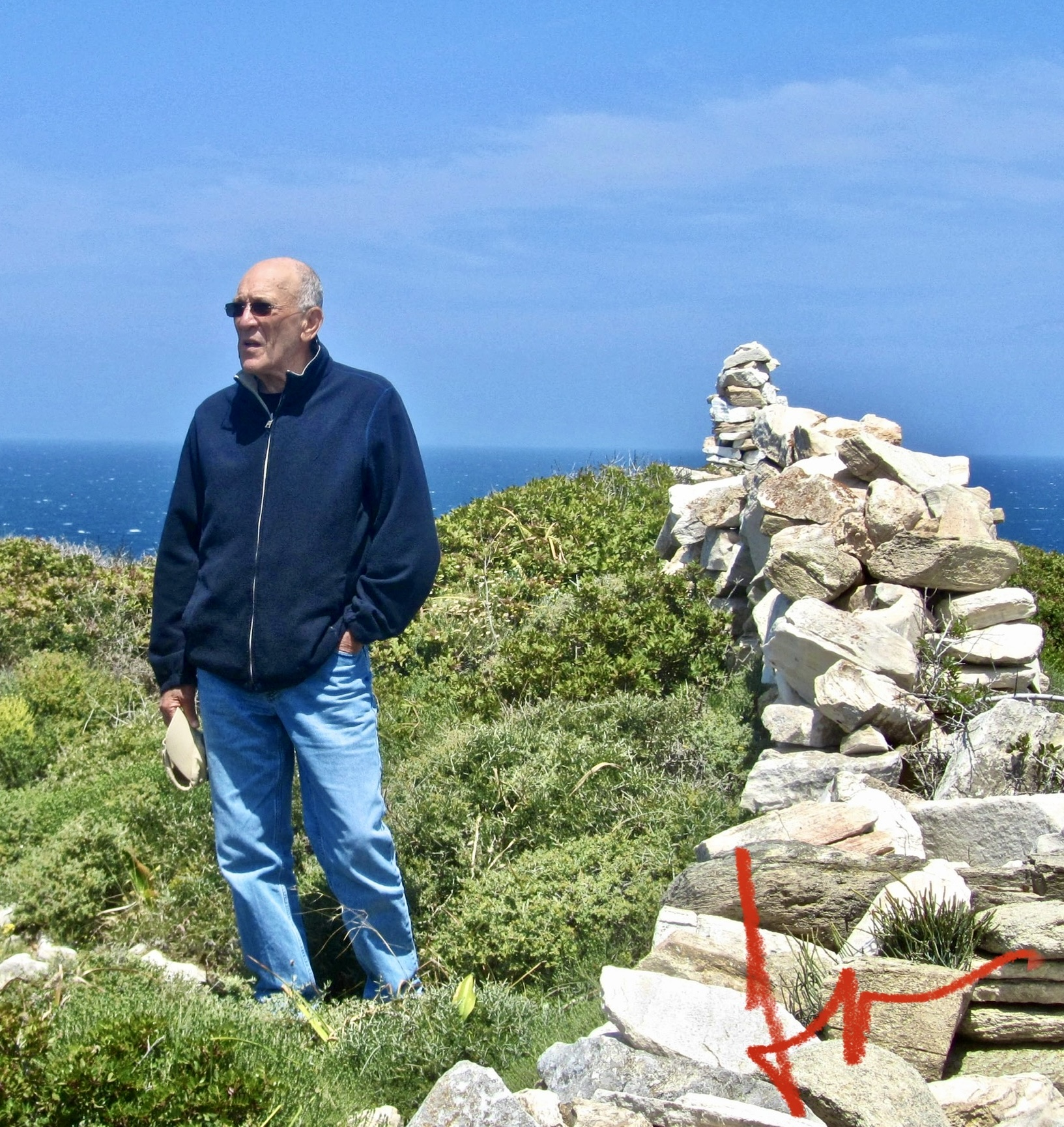
- Nur in 2023
- Born: February 9, 1938; Haifa, Israel
- Died: June 11, 2024 (aged 86); Stanford, California, US
- Citizenship: American
- Education: Hebrew University of Jerusalem; Massachusetts Institute of Technology
- Known for: Rock physics; geophysics; Historical earthquakes; oil monitoring
- Scientific career
- Fields: Geology; geophysics
- Workplaces: Stanford University

Amos Nur (February 9, 1938 – June 11, 2024) was an American-Israeli geophysicist and professor emeritus at Stanford University in California.

Stanford University called him, "one of the world's foremost experts in geology and geophysics". He applied the results of rock physics to understanding tectonic physical processes in the earth's crust, the main of which is the role of fluids in the processes occurring in the crust and in energy resources. "Nur pioneered the use of seismic velocity measurements to characterize the changing state of oil and gas reservoirs, where the volume of fluid in the rock changes during pumping". The process was named "Four-Dimensional Seismic Monitoring". Nur was in the Geophysics department at Stanford University from 1970 until his retirement in 2008, and he remained associated with the school as professor emeritus. After his retirement, Nur joined Ingrain, a company he helped found in 2007, where he was Chief technology officer.

== Early life and pre Stanford education ==
Nur was born in Haifa, Israel and studied at the Hebrew Reali High School in the city. As part of his military service, he served as an officer in the paratrooper brigade. In 1962 he completed his studies for a B.Sc degree in geology at the Hebrew University of Jerusalem. He studied for a short period with Fritz Gassmann in Switzerland, and went on to doctoral studies in the Department of Geophysics at the Massachusetts Institute of Technology, which he completed in 1969.

== Academic career ==
Nur performed an experiment involving anisotropy (shear wave splitting) caused by pressure in rocks. "His work on the elastic properties of fractured rock forms a large part of the experimental and theoretical basis for modern methods for locating and mapping seismic fractures." He observed that seismic velocity is sensitive to effective pressure and fluid saturation, phenomena important in the discovery and seismic monitoring of oil and other hydrocarbon reservoirs.

When Nur joined the Department of Geophysics at Stanford, he founded the "Rock Physics and Borehole Geophysics (SRB)" project, one of the earliest university-industry consortia in the country, with collaboration between academia and the oil industry. The SRB project became a center for research and development in rock physics experiments, theory and application. Nur and his students have developed rock physics as a technology for exploration, reservoir characterization and time-lapse monitoring.

During the 1970s, he proposed dilatation-diffusion as the mechanism underlying the unusual VP/VS relationships observed before some earthquakes, which gave rise to debates.

In 1976 he was elected a fellow of the American Geophysical Union, and in 1980 a fellow of the Geological Society of America. In 2001 he was elected to the National Academy of Engineering. In 1996 he was awarded honorary membership of Society of Exploration Geophysicists. His ideas on block rotation tectonics led to a better understanding of stress relations in complex environments between tectonic plates.

Nur became a full professor at Stanford in 1979 and held the Wayne Loel Professorship in Earth Sciences from 1988 until his retirement. He served as Chair of the Geophysics Department, and as Director of Stanford's university - wide Overseas Studies Program.

His documentary "The Fall of the Walls – Earthquakes in the Holy Land", combined geophysical, archaeological and biblical evidence to explore the impact of large earthquakes on ancient and modern societies. He expanded on this matter in the book he wrote called "Apocalypse". Chapter 7 of it focuses on the earthquakes throughout history in the Land of Israel. Additional studies that he conducted dealt with the earthquakes that occurred in the Land of Israel throughout history. In 1991 he won the Silver Apple Award from the National Festival in the United States for Educational Films and Videos, for a video that dealt with the earthquakes in the Holy Land (produced with Prof. Hagai Ron).

He has also lectured on "Oil and War" and the risks associated with growing global competition for energy.

== Awards and honors ==
- 1974 – American Geophysical Union's Macelwane Medal
- 1975 – Newcomb Cleveland Prize, American Association for the Advancement of Science
- 1976 – Fellow of American Geophysical Union
- 1980 – Fellow of the Geological Society of America
- 1990 – Fellow of the California Academy of Sciences
- 1991 – Winner of the Silver Apple Award for physical sciences at the National Educational Film Festival
- 1997 – SEG (Society of Exploration Geophysics) Distinguished Lecturer
- 1998 – AAPG (American Association of Petroleum Geologists) Distinguished Lecturer
- 2001 – member of the National Academy of Engineering
- 2011 – the Ewing Medal from the Society of Exploration Geophysics
- 2013 – honorary doctorate at University of Haifa, Israel
