= Ron (surname) =

Ron is a surname. Notable people with the surname include:

== Female ==
- Dana Ron (born 1964), Israeli computer scientist and professor of electrical engineering
- Elaine Ron (1943–2010), American epidemiologist
- Eliora Z. Ron, Israeli microbiologist
- Liat Ron, Israeli-born American actress, playwright, filmmaker, dancer, and dance instructor
- Lina Ron (1959–2011), Venezuelan political leader
- Mercedes Ron (born 1993), Argentine-born Spanish author
- Pen Ron (c. 1944–c. 1979), Cambodian singer and songwriter

== Male ==
- Carlos Ron (born 1953), Ecuadorian footballer
- Emri Ron (1936–2013), Israeli politician
- Hagai Ron (1944–2012), Israeli university professor of geology and geophysics
- Ivo Ron (born 1967), Ecuadorian retired footballer
- Jason De Ron (born 1973), Australian musician and producer
- José Ron (born 1981), Mexican television actor
- Lior Ron (born 1982), Israeli-American entrepreneur and music composer
- Lior Ron (business executive) (born 1977), Israeli businessman
- Michael Ron (born 1932), Israeli retired Olympic fencer
- Michael Røn (born 1984), Danish-born Norwegian footballer
- Moshe Ron (1925–2001), Israeli materials scientist
- Ron Ron (Ronald White, fl. from 2005), American rapper and director
- Yuval Ron, Israeli world music artist, composer, educator, peace activist, and record producer

== See also ==
- Ron (given name), including a list of people with the name
- Ron (singer) (Rosalino Cellamare, born 1953), Italian singer
