= Ron Wells =

Ron Wells may refer to:

- Ron Wells (American football) (born 1961), American former football player
- Ron Wells (politician) (1935–2024), Australian politician
