= Keith Weber =

American football and baseball player (1942–2011)

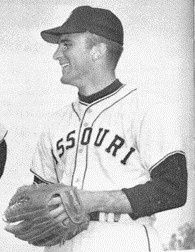
Weber from the Missouri Tigers

Anthony "Keith" Weber (April 27, 1942 – February 18, 2011) was an American quarterback and pitcher for the University of Missouri, most notable for holding the NCAA record for lowest earned run average (ERA), at 0.56 for his college career.

== Biography ==
Weber played college football and college baseball for the Missouri Tigers. As a junior, Weber helped lead Missouri to the 1963 College World Series, where they were eliminated by eventual champion Southern California. In 1964, Weber earned First-team All-American honors while anchoring a Missouri pitching staff that still holds the NCAA record for lowest single-season team ERA, surrendering just 19 earned runs in 264 innings for an ERA of 0.65. Weber and Missouri returned to the 1964 College World Series, falling to Minnesota in the championship game.

In his two trips to the College World Series, Weber pitched 24 1/3 innings while giving up zero earned runs, which remains the most innings pitched by anyone in the College World Series without giving up an earned run.

Upon his graduation from Missouri in 1964, Weber played collegiate summer baseball for the Cotuit Kettleers of the Cape Cod Baseball League and was named a league all-star. He represented the United States in baseball at the 1964 Summer Olympics as a demonstration sport, one of seven pitchers on the team. Weber then played a single season of minor league baseball in 1965 with the Williamsport Mets, before returning to Missouri to attend law school while working as an assistant football coach under Dan Devine.

After a career in real estate, Weber died of kidney cancer on February 18, 2011.
