= 1964 Texas A&M Aggies baseball team =

American college baseball season

1964 Texas A&M Aggies baseball

Southwest Conference champions District VI Playoff champions

College World Series, T-5th
- Conference: Southwest Conference

Ranking
- Coaches: No. 8
- Record: 19–8–1 (12–3 SWC)
- Head coach: Tom Chandler (6th season)
- Captains: Bill Hancock; Bill Grochett
- Home stadium: Travis Park

1964 Southwest Conference baseball standings
	Conf.						Overall
Team	W		L		T	PCT	W		L		T	PCT
No. 8 Texas A&M ‍†‍‍^{y}	12	–	3	–	1	.781	19	–	8	–	1	.696
No. 26 Baylor ‍‍‍	10	–	5	–	0	.667	18	–	7	–	0	.720
No. 12 Texas ‍‍‍	10	–	5	–	1	.656	16	–	7	–	1	.688
TCU ‍‍‍	5	–	8	–	0	.385	11	–	12	–	0	.478
SMU ‍‍‍	3	–	10	–	0	.231	6	–	14	–	0	.300
Rice ‍‍‍	3	–	12	–	0	.200	5	–	18	–	0	.217
† – Conference champion y – Invited to the NCAA tournament As of June 30, 1964; Rankings from Collegiate Baseball

The 1964 Texas A&M Aggies baseball team represented Texas A&M University in the 1964 NCAA University Division baseball season. The Aggies played their home games at Travis Park. The team was coached by Tom Chandler in his 6th year at Texas A&M.

The Aggies won the District VI playoff to advance to the College World Series, where they were defeated by the Seton Hall.

== Roster ==
1964 Texas A&M Aggies baseball team
Players
Coaches

#	Pos.	Name	B/T	Height	Weight	Year	Home town
		Jerry Ballard	/	—	—
6		Richard Beller	/	—	—	Sr
23		R Byrd	/	—	—
24		F Carlton	/	—	—
		Lance Cobb	/	—	—	So
	INF	Billy Crain	/	—	—	So
12		John Crain	/	—	—	Sr
20		M Dawkins	/	—	—
4		Bill Grochett (C)	/	—	—
10	C	Bill Hancock (C)	/	—	—
1		George Hargett	/	—	—	Sr
9	P	Steve Hillhouse	/	—	—	So
		Allen Koonce	/	—	—	So
14		J Lee	/	—	—
16		R McAdams	/	—	—
		Mike McClure	/	—	—
18	P	Chuck McGuire	/	—	—	Sr	Dallas, Texas
15	C	Jerry Pizzatola	/	—	—	Sr
	INF	Bob Sanders	/	—	—
7	INF	Frank Stark	/	—	—	Sr
17		Dewayne Stewart	/	—	—
5		N Thompson	/	—	—

Head coach

19 Tom Chandler

Assistant coach(es)

Legend

- (C) Team captain
- (S) Suspended
- (I) Ineligible
- Injured
- Current redshirt

== Schedule ==
1964 Texas A&M Aggies baseball game log
Regular season
March (6–4)

#	Date	Opponent	Site/stadium	Score	Overall record	SWC record
1	March	Texas Lutheran	Travis Park • College Station, Texas	3–6	0–1	–
2	March 7	St. Mary's (TX)	Travis Park • College Station, Texas	0–2	0–2	–
3	March	Sul Ross State	Travis Park • College Station, Texas	5–4	1–2	–
4	March	Sul Ross State	Travis Park • College Station, Texas	0–3	1–3	–
5	March 14	St. Edward's	Travis Park • College Station, Texas	9–2	2–3	–
6	March	Texas Lutheran	Travis Park • College Station, Texas	13–4	3–3	–
7	March 18	at TCU	Unknown • Fort Worth, Texas	7–14	3–4	0–1
8	March 21	Texas	Travis Park • College Station, Texas	5–2	4–4	1–1
9	March	Minnesota	Travis Park • College Station, Texas	7–2	5–4	1–1
10	March	Minnesota	Travis Park • College Station, Texas	3–2	6–4	1–1

April (10–1)

#	Date	Opponent	Site/stadium	Score	Overall record	SWC record
11	April 1	at Baylor	Unknown • Waco, Texas	7–8	6–5	1–2
12	April 4	at Rice	Rice Baseball Field • Houston, Texas	9–5	7–5	2–2
13	April 6	Texas Tech	Travis Park • College Station, Texas	12–2	8–5	2–2
14	April 7	SMU	Travis Park • College Station, Texas	3–2	9–5	3–2
15	April 10	TCU	Travis Park • College Station, Texas	5–1	10–5	4–2
16	April 11	TCU	Travis Park • College Station, Texas	5–1	11–5	5–2
17	April 14	at St. Mary's (TX)	Unknown • San Antonio, Texas	9–1	12–5	5–2
18	April	SMU	Travis Park • College Station, Texas	6–1	13–5	6–2
19	April 18	at SMU	Unknown • Dallas, Texas	7–2	14–5	7–2
20	April 24	Rice	Travis Park • College Station, Texas	2–0	15–5	8–2
21	April 28	Rice	Travis Park • College Station, Texas	11–4	16–5	9–2

May (3–1–1)

#	Date	Opponent	Site/stadium	Score	Overall record	SWC record
22	May 1	Baylor	Travis Park • College Station, Texas	7–4	17–5	10–2
23	May 2	Baylor	Travis Park • College Station, Texas	2–0	18–5	11–2
24	May 7	at Texas	Clark Field • Austin, Texas	5–5	18–5–1	11–2–1
25	May 8	at Texas	Clark Field • Austin, Texas	2–3	18–6–1	11–3–1
26	May 8	at Texas	Clark Field • Austin, Texas	5–2	19–6–1	12–3–1

Postseason
College World Series (0–2)

#	Date	Opponent	Site/stadium	Score	Overall record	SWC record
27	June 8	vs Minnesota	Omaha Municipal Stadium • Omaha, Nebraska	3–7	19–7–1	12–3–1
28	June 10	vs Seton Hall	Omaha Municipal Stadium • Omaha, Nebraska	5–14	19–8–1	12–3–1

== Awards and honors ==
Jerry Ballard

- All-Southwest Conference

Bill Grochett

- All-Southwest Conference

Jerry Koonce

- All-Southwest Conference

Bill Hancock

- All-Southwest Conference

George Hargett

- All-Southwest Conference

Steve Hillhouse

- All-Southwest Conference

Frank Stark

- All-Southwest Conference
