= 1964 Ole Miss Rebels baseball team =

American college baseball season

1964 Ole Miss Rebels baseball

SEC Western Division champion SEC Champion District III champion

College World Series, T-7th
- Conference: Southeastern Conference
- Western
- Record: 24–7 (11–1 SEC)
- Head coach: Tom Swayze (13th season)
- Home stadium: Swayze Field

1964 Southeastern Conference baseball standings
| | Conf. | | | | Overall |
| Team | W | | L | PCT | W | | L | PCT |
|---|---|---|---|---|---|---|---|---|
Eastern Division
| No. 13 Auburn ^{x}‍‍‍ | 12 | – | 3 | .800 | 20 | – | 5 | .800 |
| Florida ‍‍‍^{y} | 13 | – | 5 | .722 | 23 | – | 11 | .676 |
| Kentucky ‍‍‍ | 10 | – | 5 | .667 | 16 | – | 7 | .696 |
| Tennessee ‍‍‍ | 8 | – | 9 | .471 | 17 | – | 14 | .548 |
| Georgia ‍‍‍ | 5 | – | 9 | .357 | 9 | – | 11 | .450 |
| Vanderbilt ‍‍‍ | 4 | – | 12 | .250 | 7 | – | 14 | .333 |
| Georgia Tech ‍‍‍ | 3 | – | 10 | .231 | 7 | – | 15 | .318 |
Western Division
| No. 7 Ole Miss ^{x}‍‍‡‍^{y} | 11 | – | 1 | .917 | 19 | – | 5 | .792 |
| Mississippi State ‍‍‍ | 7 | – | 7 | .500 | 17 | – | 12 | .586 |
| Alabama ‍‍‍ | 6 | – | 8 | .429 | 10 | – | 10 | .500 |
| LSU ‍‍‍ | 5 | – | 7 | .417 | 11 | – | 11 | .500 |
| Tulane ‍‍‍ | 4 | – | 10 | .286 | 12 | – | 13 | .480 |
x – Division champion ‡ – Tournament champion y – Invited to the NCAA tournament As of June 30, 1964; Rankings from Collegiate Baseball

The 1964 Ole Miss Rebels baseball team represented the University of Mississippi in the 1964 NCAA University Division baseball season. The Rebels played their home games at Swayze Field. The team was coached by Tom Swayze in his 13th year as head coach at Ole Miss.

The Rebels won the District III to advance to the College World Series, where they were defeated by the Arizona State Sun Devils.

== Roster ==
1964 Ole Miss Rebels baseball team
Players
Coaches

| # | Pos. | Name | B/T | Height | Weight | Year | Home town |
|---|---|---|---|---|---|---|---|
| | | Jan Adelman | / | — | — |
| | | Richard Almond | / | — | — |
| | | Chet Bergalowski | / | — | — |
| | | Bobby Boyd | / | — | — |
| | | Eddie Brawley | / | — | — |
| | | Nathan Fisher | / | — | — |
| | P | Larry Higginbotham | / | — | — | Jr |
| | | Dennis Huffman | / | — | — |
| | P | Russ Johnson | / | — | — | Fr |
| | | Jimmy Jones | / | — | — |
| | INF | Don Kessinger | / | — | — | Jr |
| 11 | INF | Tommy Keyes | /L | — | — |
| 13 | OF | Glenn Lusk | / | — | — |
| | | Rodney Mattina | / | — | — |
| | | Bill McGlathery | / | — | — |
| | | Tommy Morris | / | — | — |
| | | Chuck Norman | / | — | — |
| | | Ron Peresich | / | — | — |
| | | Richie Perkins | / | — | — |
| | | Dave Presley | / | — | — |
| | P | Richie Prine | / | — | — |
| | | Jerry Rikard | / | — | — |
| 14 | OF | Fred Roberts | / | — | — |
| | | Bill Rogers | / | — | — |
| | | Kenny Ryland | / | — | — |
| | INF | Billy Sumrall | / | — | — |
| | | Ray Whitener | / | — | — |
| | | Mickey Williams | / | — | — |

Head coach

Tom Swayze

Assistant coach(es)

Legend

- (C) Team captain
- (S) Suspended
- (I) Ineligible
- Injured
- Current redshirt

Roster
Last update: April 8, 2021

== Schedule ==
1964 Ole Miss Rebels baseball game log
Regular season
March (3–1)

| # | Date | Opponent | Site/stadium | Score | Overall record | SEC record |
|---|---|---|---|---|---|---|
| 1 | March 27 | Illinois Wesleyan | Swayze Field • Oxford, Mississippi | 5–1 | 1–0 | – |
| 2 | March 28 | Illinois Wesleyan | Swayze Field • Oxford, Mississippi | 5–1 | 2–0 | – |
| 3 | March 30 | at Southern Mississippi | Unknown • Hattiesburg, Mississippi | 0–2 | 2–1 | – |
| 4 | March 31 | vs Southern Mississippi | Rahaim Park • Laurel, Mississippi | 10–2 | 3–1 | – |

Postseason
April (14–1)

| # | Date | Opponent | Site/stadium | Score | Overall record | SEC record |
|---|---|---|---|---|---|---|
| 5 | April 1 | at Southeastern Louisiana | Alumni Field • Hammond, Louisiana | 9–10 | 3–2 | – |
| 6 | April 2 | at Southeastern Louisiana | Alumni Field • Hammond, Louisiana | 7–1 | 4–2 | – |
| 7 | April 3 | at Tulane | Tulane Diamond • New Orleans, Louisiana | 9–0 | 5–2 | 1–0 |
| 8 | April 4 | at Tulane | Tulane Diamond • New Orleans, Louisiana | 12–10 | 6–2 | 2–0 |
| 9 | April 7 | at LSU | Alex Box Stadium • Baton Rouge, Louisiana | 4–3 | 7–2 | 3–0 |
| 10 | April 7 | LSU | Swayze Field • Oxford, Mississippi | 11–0 | 8–2 | 4–0 |
| 11 | April 10 | at Alabama | Sewell–Thomas Stadium • Tuscaloosa, Alabama | 9–5 | 9–2 | 5–0 |
| 12 | April 11 | at Alabama | Sewell–Thomas Stadium • Tuscaloosa, Alabama | 14–2 | 10–2 | 6–0 |
| 13 | April 14 | Delta State | Swayze Field • Oxford, Mississippi | 9–6 | 11–2 | 6–0 |
| 14 | April 15 | Delta State | Swayze Field • Oxford, Mississippi | 7–6 | 12–2 | 6–0 |
| 15 | April 17 | Tulane | Swayze Field • Oxford, Mississippi | 8–1 | 13–2 | 7–0 |
| 16 | April 18 | Tulane | Sewell–Thomas Stadium • Tuscaloosa, Alabama | 12–3 | 14–2 | 8–0 |
| 17 | April 20 | at Mississippi State | Unknown • Starkville, Mississippi | 7–5 | 15–2 | 9–0 |
| 18 | April 21 | at Mississippi State | Swayze Field • Starkville, Mississippi | 8–0 | 16–2 | 10–0 |
| 19 | April 29 | Murray State | Swayze Field • Oxford, Mississippi | 15–1 | 17–2 | 10–0 |

May (2–2)

| # | Date | Opponent | Site/stadium | Score | Overall record | SEC record |
|---|---|---|---|---|---|---|
| 20 | May 1 | Alabama | Swayze Field • Oxford, Mississippi | 6–0 | 18–2 | 11–0 |
| 21 | May 4 | at Nicholls State | Ray E. Didier Field • Thibodaux, Louisiana | 2–5 | 18–3 | 11–0 |
| 22 | May 5 | at Nicholls State | Ray E. Didier Field • Thibodaux, Louisiana | 8–0 | 19–3 | 11–0 |
| 23 | May 8 | Mississippi State | Unknown • Starkville, Mississippi | 2–5 | 19–4 | 11–1 |

Postseason
SEC Conference Championship (2–1)

| # | Date | Opponent | Site/stadium | Score | Overall record | SEC record |
|---|---|---|---|---|---|---|
| 24 | May 13 | at Auburn | Plainsman Park • Auburn, Alabama | 3–8 | 19–5 | 11–1 |
| 25 | May 15 | Auburn | Sawyze Field • Oxford, Mississippi | 7–0 | 20–5 | 11–1 |
| 26 | May 17 | Auburn | Sawyze Field • Oxford, Mississippi | 5–0 | 21–5 | 11–1 |

NCAA District III Playoff (2–1)

| # | Date | Opponent | Site/stadium | Score | Overall record | SEC record |
|---|---|---|---|---|---|---|
| 27 | May 28 | vs West Virginia | Sims Legion Park • Gastonia, North Carolina | 11–0 | 22–5 | 11–1 |
| 28 | May 28 | vs North Carolina | Sims Legion Park • Gastonia, North Carolina | 4–3 | 23–5 | 11–1 |
| 29 | May 30 | vs North Carolina | Sims Legion Park • Gastonia, North Carolina | 13–1 | 24–5 | 11–1 |

College World Series (0–2)

| # | Date | Opponent | Site/stadium | Score | Overall record | SEC record |
|---|---|---|---|---|---|---|
| 30 | June 9 | vs Southern California | Omaha Municipal Stadium • Omaha, Nebraska | 2–3 | 24–6 | 11–1 |
| 31 | June 10 | vs Arizona State | Omaha Municipal Stadium • Omaha, Nebraska | 0–5 | 24–7 | 11–1 |

== Awards and honors ==
Don Kessinger

- All-SEC
- All-SEC Western Division
- All-District III Team
- First Team All-America American Baseball Coaches Association
- First Team All-America The Sporting News

Tommy Keyes

- All-SEC
- All-SEC Western Division

Glenn Lusk

- All-SEC
- All-SEC Western Division

Rich Prine

- All-SEC
- All-SEC Western Division

Fred Roberts

- All-SEC Western Division

Billy Sumrall

- All-SEC Western Division
