= 1964 NCAA University Division baseball season =

Baseball season

NCAA tournament

College World Series
- Champions: Minnesota (3rd title)
- Runners-up: Missouri (6th CWS Appearance)
- Winning coach: Dick Siebert (3rd title)
- MOP: Joe Ferris (Maine)

Seasons
- ← 1963 1965 →

The 1964 NCAA University Division baseball season, play of college baseball in the United States organized by the National Collegiate Athletic Association (NCAA) began in the spring of 1964. The season progressed through the regular season and concluded with the 1964 College World Series. The College World Series, held for the eighteenth time in 1964, consisted of one team from each of eight geographical districts and was held in Omaha, Nebraska at Johnny Rosenblatt Stadium as a double-elimination tournament. Minnesota claimed the championship.

== Conference winners ==
This is a partial list of conference champions from the 1964 season. Each of the eight geographical districts chose, by various methods, the team that would represent them in the NCAA tournament. 8 teams earned automatic bids by winning their conference championship while 13 teams earned at-large selections.

Conference	Regular season winner
Atlantic Coast Conference	North Carolina
Big Eight Conference	Missouri
Big Ten Conference	Minnesota
CIBA	Southern California
EIBL	Harvard
Mid-American Conference	Kent State/Ohio
Pacific Coast Conference	Oregon
Southeastern Conference	Ole Miss
Southern Conference	West Virginia
Southwest Conference	Texas A&M
Yankee Conference	Maine

== Conference standings ==
The following is an incomplete list of conference standings:

1964 Athletic Association of Western Universities baseball standings
	Conf.						Overall
Team	W		L		T	PCT	W		L		T	PCT
North Division
No. 9 Oregon ‍†‍‍^{y}	11	–	5	–	0	.688	31	–	11	–	0	.738
No. 21 Washington State ‍‍‍	10	–	6	–	0	.625	31	–	9	–	0	.775
No. 22 Oregon State ‍‍‍	8	–	8	–	0	.500	25	–	11	–	0	.694
Washington ‍‍‍	6	–	10	–	0	.375	12	–	14	–	0	.462
Idaho ‍‍‍	5	–	11	–	0	.313	0	–	0	–	0	–
California Intercollegiate Baseball Association
No. 4 USC ‍†‍‍^{y}	17	–	3	–	0	.850	34	–	11	–	0	.756
No. 10 Santa Clara ‍‍‍	16	–	4	–	0	.800	28	–	8	–	0	.778
No. 19 UCLA ‍‍‍	13	–	7	–	0	.650	35	–	16	–	2	.679
UC Santa Barbara ‍‍‍	5	–	15	–	0	.250	12	–	26	–	0	.316
California ‍‍‍	5	–	15	–	0	.250	25	–	17	–	0	.595
Stanford ‍‍‍	4	–	16	–	0	.200	20	–	24	–	0	.455
† – Conference champion y – Invited to the NCAA tournament As of June 30, 1964; Rankings from Collegiate Baseball

1964 Big Ten Conference baseball standings
	Conf.						Overall
Team	W		L		T	PCT	W		L		T	PCT
No. 1 Minnesota ‍†‍‍^{y}	11	–	3	–	0	.786	31	–	12	–	0	.721
Michigan ‍‍‍	10	–	4	–	0	.714	19	–	16	–	0	.543
Ohio State ‍‍‍	10	–	5	–	0	.667	21	–	10	–	0	.677
No. 25 Michigan State ‍‍‍	8	–	7	–	0	.533	22	–	12	–	0	.647
Purdue ‍‍‍	8	–	7	–	0	.533	15	–	10	–	0	.600
Wisconsin ‍‍‍	8	–	7	–	0	.533	14	–	14	–	0	.500
Indiana ‍‍‍	7	–	8	–	0	.467	23	–	12	–	0	.657
Iowa ‍‍‍	7	–	8	–	0	.467	13	–	16	–	1	.450
Northwestern ‍‍‍	4	–	11	–	0	.267	9	–	17	–	0	.346
Illinois ‍‍‍	1	–	14	–	0	.067	9	–	22	–	0	.290
† – Conference champion y – Invited to the NCAA tournament As of June 30, 1964; Rankings from Collegiate Baseball

1964 Southeastern Conference baseball standings
	Conf.				Overall
Team	W		L	PCT	W		L	PCT
Eastern Division
No. 13 Auburn ^{x}‍‍‍	12	–	3	.800	20	–	5	.800
Florida ‍‍‍^{y}	13	–	5	.722	23	–	11	.676
Kentucky ‍‍‍	10	–	5	.667	16	–	7	.696
Tennessee ‍‍‍	8	–	9	.471	17	–	14	.548
Georgia ‍‍‍	5	–	9	.357	9	–	11	.450
Vanderbilt ‍‍‍	4	–	12	.250	7	–	14	.333
Georgia Tech ‍‍‍	3	–	10	.231	7	–	15	.318
Western Division
No. 7 Ole Miss ^{x}‍‍‡‍^{y}	11	–	1	.917	19	–	5	.792
Mississippi State ‍‍‍	7	–	7	.500	17	–	12	.586
Alabama ‍‍‍	6	–	8	.429	10	–	10	.500
LSU ‍‍‍	5	–	7	.417	11	–	11	.500
Tulane ‍‍‍	4	–	10	.286	12	–	13	.480
x – Division champion ‡ – Tournament champion y – Invited to the NCAA tournament As of June 30, 1964; Rankings from Collegiate Baseball

1964 Southern Conference baseball standings
	Conf.				Overall
Team	W		L	PCT	W		L	PCT
No. 15 West Virginia ‍†‍‍^{y}	14	–	2	.875	24	–	5	.828
Furman ‍‍‍	10	–	3	.769	17	–	11	.607
Davidson ‍‍‍	9	–	5	.643	14	–	13	.519
Virginia Tech ‍‍‍	9	–	6	.600	12	–	10	.545
Richmond ‍‍‍	5	–	7	.417	8	–	11	.421
George Washington ‍‍‍	5	–	8	.385	6	–	12	.333
VMI ‍‍‍	5	–	9	.357	10	–	12	.455
The Citadel ‍‍‍	3	–	10	.231	7	–	12	.368
William & Mary ‍‍‍	2	–	12	.143	2	–	14	.125
† – Conference champion y – Invited to the NCAA Tournament; As of June 30, 1964; Rankings from Collegiate Baseball

1964 Southwest Conference baseball standings
	Conf.						Overall
Team	W		L		T	PCT	W		L		T	PCT
No. 8 Texas A&M ‍†‍‍^{y}	12	–	3	–	1	.781	19	–	8	–	1	.696
No. 26 Baylor ‍‍‍	10	–	5	–	0	.667	18	–	7	–	0	.720
No. 12 Texas ‍‍‍	10	–	5	–	1	.656	16	–	7	–	1	.688
TCU ‍‍‍	5	–	8	–	0	.385	11	–	12	–	0	.478
SMU ‍‍‍	3	–	10	–	0	.231	6	–	14	–	0	.300
Rice ‍‍‍	3	–	12	–	0	.200	5	–	18	–	0	.217
† – Conference champion y – Invited to the NCAA tournament As of June 30, 1964; Rankings from Collegiate Baseball

1964 Western Athletic Conference baseball standings
	Conf.				Overall
Team	W		L	PCT	W		L	PCT
Northern
Utah ‍‍‍	6	–	4	.600	14	–	16	.467
Wyoming ‍‍‍	5	–	5	.500	16	–	16	.500
BYU ‍‍‍	4	–	6	.400	18	–	24	.429
Southern
No. 5 Arizona State ‍†‍‍^{y}	11	–	1	.917	44	–	7	.863
No. 20 Arizona ‍‍‍	7	–	5	.583	31	–	13	.705
New Mexico ‍‍‍	0	–	12	.000	8	–	29	.216
† – Conference champion y – Invited to the NCAA tournament As of June 30, 1964; Rankings from Collegiate Baseball

1964 Yankee Conference baseball standings
	Conf.						Overall
Team	W		L		T	PCT	W		L		T	PCT
No. 3 Maine ‍†‍‍^{y}	8	–	2	–	0	.800	21	–	8	–	0	.724
Vermont ‍‍‍	6	–	4	–	0	.600		–		–		–
Rhode Island ‍‍‍	5	–	5	–	0	.500	5	–	13	–	0	.278
New Hampshire ‍‍‍	4	–	6	–	0	.400	6	–	10	–	0	.375
UMass ‍‍‍	3	–	6	–	1	.350	7	–	10	–	1	.417
Connecticut ‍‍‍	3	–	6	–	1	.350	8	–	12	–	1	.405
† – Conference champion y – Invited to the NCAA tournament As of June 30, 1964; Rankings from Collegiate Baseball

== College World Series ==
The 1964 season marked the eighteenth NCAA baseball tournament, which culminated with the eight team College World Series. The College World Series was held in Omaha, Nebraska. The eight teams played a double-elimination format, with Minnesota claiming their third championship with a 5–1 win over Missouri in the final.

Upper round 1
Maine	5
Seton Hall	1
Minnesota	7
Texas A&M	3
Southern California	3
Ole Miss	2
Missouri	7
Arizona State	0

Upper round 2
Maine	0
Minnesota	12
Southern California	3
Missouri	2
Lower round 1
Seton Hall	14
Texas A&M	5
Arizona State	5
Ole Miss	0

Upper final
Minnesota	6
Southern California	5
Lower round 2
Missouri	3
Seton Hall	1
Maine	4
Arizona State	2

Semifinals
Minnesota	1
Missouri	4
Maine	2
Southern California	1

Preliminary final
Missouri	2
Maine	1

Final
Missouri	1
Minnesota	5
