= Ronn =

Ronn or Rönn or Rønn may refer to:

== Companies ==
- Ronn Motor Company, a car manufacturer based in Austin, Texas
- Ronn Records, a subsidiary of Jewel Records (Shreveport record label)

== Surname ==
- Cecilia Rönn (born 1980), Swedish politician
- Christian Rønn (born 1969), Danish musician and composer
- Jyri Rönn (born 1971), Finnish ice hockey referee
- Solveig Rönn-Christiansson (1902–1982), Swedish politician

== Given name ==
- Ronn Carroll (active from 1980), American actor
- Ronn Lucas (born 1954), American ventriloquist and stand-up comedian
- Ronn Matlock (1947–2020), American singer and songwriter
- Ronn McFarlane (born 1953), American lutenist and composer
- Ronn McMahon (active 1990–1994), Canadian basketball player
- Ronn Metcalfe (1930–1969), Canadian big band leader
- Ronn Moss (born 1952), American actor, musician and singer/songwriter
- Ronn Owens (born 1945), American talk radio host
- Ronn Reynolds (born 1958), American MLB catcher
- Ronn Sutton (born 1952), Canadian illustrator and comic book artist
- Ronn Tomassoni (born 1958), American ice hockey player and coach
- Ronn Torossian (born 1974), American public relations executive

== See also ==
- Ron (disambiguation)
