= Ty McDevitt =

American baseball coach (born 1993)

Current position
- Title: Head coach
- Team: Minnesota
- Conference: Big Ten
- Record: 54–51 (.514)

Biographical details
- Born: February 1, 1993 (age 33); Apple Valley, Minnesota, U.S.

Playing career
- 2012–2016: Minnesota
- Position: Pitcher

Coaching career (HC unless noted)
- 2017–2018: Minnesota (volunteer assistant)
- 2019–2024: Minnesota (pitching)
- 2025–present: Minnesota

Head coaching record
- Overall: 54–51 (.514)

Ty McDevitt (born February 1, 1993) is an American college baseball coach and currently the head coach for the Minnesota Golden Gophers baseball team. McDevitt previously played collegiately and was an assistant coach for Minnesota before becoming head coach.

== Early life and education ==
McDevitt was born on February 1, 1993, and is a native of Apple Valley, Minnesota, where he attended the local Eastview High School. After graduating from high school, McDevitt attended the University of Minnesota, where he played for its baseball team for five seasons as a relief pitcher. McDevitt graduated from Minnesota with a bachelor's degree in sociology.

== Coaching career ==
Following his college career, McDevitt became a volunteer assistant for the Minnesota Golden Gophers baseball team. After two seasons as an assistant, McDevitt was promoted to the role of pitching coach. McDevitt is credited with helping the development of pitchers, one of whom being Max Meyer, who was selected 3rd overall in the 2020 MLB draft. In 2023, McDevitt took a temporary leave of absence from coaching due to health issues caused by Lyme disease. After the 2024 season and the retirement of long-time head coach John Anderson, McDevitt was hired as head coach of the Minnesota Golden Gophers baseball team. McDevitt's hire was supported by many close to the Minnesota baseball program, including Anderson himself. McDevitt prioritized recruiting the top baseball players from Minnesota before the 2025 season. Also before his first season, McDevitt detailed the search for a premier pitcher and cutting back on mistakes as goals for success in the 2025 season.

== Personal life ==
McDevitt is married to his wife, Claire, and has two children: Mila and Max.

== Head coaching record ==
Record table
Season	Team	Overall	Conference	Standing	Postseason
Minnesota Golden Gophers (Big Ten Conference) (2025–present)
2025	Minnesota	24–28	10–20	16th	
2026	Minnesota	30–23	11–19	T–12th	
Minnesota:		54–51 (.514)	21–39 (.350)		
Total:		54–51 (.514)			
National champion Postseason invitational champion Conference regular season champion Conference regular season and conference tournament champion Division regular season champion Division regular season and conference tournament champion Conference tournament champion
