= 1964 Missouri Tigers baseball team =

American college baseball season

1964 Missouri Tigers baseball

Big Eight Champions District V champions

College World Series, Runner-Up
- Conference: Big Eight Conference

Ranking
- Coaches: No. 2
- CB: No. 2
- Record: 26–5–1 (17–0 Big 8)
- Head coach: Hi Simmons (26th season)
- Home stadium: Simmons Field

The 1964 Missouri Tigers baseball team represented the University of Missouri in the 1964 NCAA University Division baseball season. The Tigers played their home games at the original Simmons Field. The team was coached by Hi Simmons in his 26th season at Missouri.

The Tigers lost the College World Series, defeated by the Minnesota Golden Gophers in the championship game.

== Roster ==
1964 Missouri Tigers roster
Pitchers: Dave Benson - Sophomore; Orville Hollrah - Sophomore; Terry L'Ange - Sophomore; Dennis Musgraves - Sophomore; James Nelson - Senior; Ron Sieck - Senior; Jack Stroud - Junior; John Thomas - Sophomore; Keith Weber - Junior	Catchers: Jim Pace - Senior; John Sevcik - Senior; Ronnie Shy - Junior; Infielders: Ronny Bartlett - Sophomore; Ronald Cummings - Sophomore; Dave Harvey - Senior; Wayne Henke - Junior; Bob Price - Senior; Robert Robben - Sophomore; Tom Seal - Sophomore; Johnny Simmons - Junior; Mike Strode - Junior	Outfielders: James Estes - Senior; Sandy Melnick - Sophomore; Dan Rudanovich - Sophomore; Jim Sevcik - Senior; Ken Sigman - Junior; Gary Woods - Senior

== Schedule and results ==
Legend
Missouri win
Missouri loss
Missouri tie

1964 Missouri Tigers baseball game log

Regular season (20–3)
Date	Opponent	Site/stadium	Score	Overall record	Big 8 record
	at TCU	TCU Diamond • Fort Worth, Texas	4–0	1–0	0–0
	at TCU	TCU Diamond • Fort Worth, Texas	2–3	1–1	0–0
	at Baylor	Unknown • Waco, Texas	2–5	1–2	0–0
	at Baylor	Unknown • Waco, Texas	1–3	1–3	0–0
	at Tulsa	Unknown • Tulsa, Oklahoma	10–0	2–3	0–0
	at Tulsa	Unknown • Tulsa, Oklahoma	13–1	3–3	0–0
	Colorado	Simmons Field • Columbia, Missouri	7–2	4–3	1–0
	Colorado	Simmons Field • Columbia, Missouri	6–4	5–3	2–0
	Colorado	Simmons Field • Columbia, Missouri	6–4	6–3	3–0
	Iowa State	Unknown • Unknown	2–0	7–3	4–0
	Kansas State	Unknown • Unknown	7–1	8–3	5–0
	Kansas State	Unknown • Unknown	2–1	9–3	6–0
April 24	Kansas State	Unknown • Unknown	6–0	10–3	7–0
	Oklahoma	Unknown • Unknown	4–1	11–3	8–0
	Oklahoma	Unknown • Unknown	3–1	12–3	9–0
	Oklahoma	Unknown • Unknown	1–0	13–3	10–0
	Oklahoma State	Unknown • Unknown	11–1	14–3	11–0
May 11	Nebraska	Unknown • Unknown	4–2	15–3	12–0
May 12	Nebraska	Unknown • Unknown	9–0	16–3	13–0
May 12	Nebraska	Unknown • Unknown	2–1	17–3	14–0
May	Kansas	Unknown • Unknown	2–1	18–3	15–0
May	Kansas	Unknown • Unknown	2–0	19–3	16–0
May	Kansas	Unknown • Unknown	4–3	20–3	17–0

Postseason (6–1–1)

District V playoffs (1–0–1)
Date	Opponent	Site/stadium	Score	Overall record	Big 8 record
	Saint Louis	Simmons Field • Columbia, Missouri	1–1	20–3–1	17–0
	Saint Louis	Simmons Field • Columbia, Missouri	2–1	21–3–1	17–0

1964 College World Series (4–2)
Date	Opponent	Site/stadium	Score	Overall record	Big 8 record
June 9	vs Arizona State	Johnny Rosenblatt Stadium • Omaha, Nebraska	7–0	22–3–1	17–0
June 12	vs USC	Johnny Rosenblatt Stadium • Omaha, Nebraska	2–3	22–4–1	17–0
June 13	vs Seton Hall	Johnny Rosenblatt Stadium • Omaha, Nebraska	3–1	23–4–1	17–0
June 15	vs Minnesota	Johnny Rosenblatt Stadium • Omaha, Nebraska	4–1	24–4–1	17–0
June 17	vs Maine	Johnny Rosenblatt Stadium • Omaha, Nebraska	2–1	25–4–1	17–0
June 18	vs Minnesota	Johnny Rosenblatt Stadium • Omaha, Nebraska	1–5	25–5–1	17–0

Schedule source:

== Awards and honors ==
Gary Woods

- All Tournament Team

Keith Weber

- First Team All-American

Dave Harvey

- First Team All-American
