= 1964 Minnesota Golden Gophers baseball team =

American college baseball season

1964 Minnesota Golden Gophers baseball

National champions Big Ten Conference champions
- Conference: Big Ten Conference
- CB: No. 1
- Record: 31–12 (11–3 Big Ten)
- Head coach: Dick Siebert (17th year)
- Home stadium: Delta Field

1964 Big Ten Conference baseball standings
	Conf.						Overall
Team	W		L		T	PCT	W		L		T	PCT
No. 1 Minnesota ‍†‍‍^{y}	11	–	3	–	0	.786	31	–	12	–	0	.721
Michigan ‍‍‍	10	–	4	–	0	.714	19	–	16	–	0	.543
Ohio State ‍‍‍	10	–	5	–	0	.667	21	–	10	–	0	.677
No. 25 Michigan State ‍‍‍	8	–	7	–	0	.533	22	–	12	–	0	.647
Purdue ‍‍‍	8	–	7	–	0	.533	15	–	10	–	0	.600
Wisconsin ‍‍‍	8	–	7	–	0	.533	14	–	14	–	0	.500
Indiana ‍‍‍	7	–	8	–	0	.467	23	–	12	–	0	.657
Iowa ‍‍‍	7	–	8	–	0	.467	13	–	16	–	1	.450
Northwestern ‍‍‍	4	–	11	–	0	.267	9	–	17	–	0	.346
Illinois ‍‍‍	1	–	14	–	0	.067	9	–	22	–	0	.290
† – Conference champion y – Invited to the NCAA tournament As of June 30, 1964; Rankings from Collegiate Baseball

The 1964 Minnesota Golden Gophers baseball team represented the University of Minnesota in the 1964 NCAA University Division baseball season. The Golden Gophers played their home games at Delta Field. The team was coached by Dick Siebert in his 17th season at Minnesota.

The Golden Gophers won the College World Series, defeating the Missouri Tigers in the championship game.

== Roster ==
1964 Minnesota Golden Gophers roster
Pitchers: Jim Ball; Dennis Johnson; Tom Lindberg; Dick Mielke; George Nelson; Joe Pollack; Rene Valenciano; Dan Howard; Catchers: Ron Wojciak; Mike Caraway; Bob Rofidal	Infielders: Dick Anderson; Jerry Cawley; Bill Davis; Pat Hergott; Dewey Markus; Dick McCullough; Ron Roalstad; Steve Schneider; Gary Droubie	Outfielders: Frank Brosseau; Archie Clark; Alan Druskin; Gary Erickson; Dave Hoffman; Bob Werness

== Schedule ==
1964 Minnesota Golden Gophers baseball game log
Regular season
March

Date	Opponent	Score	Overall record	Big Ten record
March 23	at Texas	4-5	0-1	–
March 23	vs. Texas Lutheran	1-6	0-2	–
March 24	at Texas	4-8	0-3	–
March 24	vs. Texas Lutheran	12-3	1-3	–
March 25	at Texas A&M	2-7	1-4	–
March 25	vs. Lackland Air Force Base	0-3	1-5	–
March 26	vs. Texas A&M	2-3	1-6	–
March 26	vs. St. Mary's	7-2	2-6	–
March 27	vs. Trinity	8-6	2-7	–
March 27	vs. Randolph Air Force Base	8-6	3-7	–
March 28	vs. Lackland Air Force Base	1-6	3-8	–

April

Date	Opponent	Score	Overall record	Big Ten record
April 10	North Dakota State	5-0	4-8	–
April 10	North Dakota State	6-0	5-8	–
April 11	St. Thomas	5-0	6-8	–
April 11	St. Thomas	5-3	7-8	–
April 15	Augsburg	7-0	8-8	–
April 17	Northern Iowa	17-6	9-8	–
April 17	Northern Iowa	18-0	10-8	–
April 18	South Dakota State	5-0	11-8	–
April 18	South Dakota State	2-1	12-8	–
April 22	Luther	8-0	13-8	–
April 22	Luther	4-1	14-8	–
April 24	at Purdue	2-3	14-9	0-1
April 25	at Illinois	4-2	15-9	1-1
April 25	at Illinois	6-2	16-9	2-1

May

Date	Opponent	Score	Overall record	Big Ten record
May 1	Iowa	9-2	17-9	3-1
May 2	Iowa	4-0	18-9	4-1
May 2	Iowa	2-0	19-9	5-1
May 9	Michigan State	4-1	20-9	6-1
May 9	Michigan State	7-4	21-9	7-1
May 15	at Indiana	8-6	22-9	8-1
May 16	at Ohio State	3-4	22-10	8-2
May 16	at Ohio State	2-3	22-11	8-3
May 22	Northwestern	3-0	23-11	9-3
May 23	Wisconsin	1-0	24-11	10-3
May 23	Wisconsin	7-1	25-11	11-3

Postseason
NCAA tournament: Mideast Regional

Date	Opponent	Score	Overall record
May 29	vs. Kent State	7-4	26-11
May 30	vs. Kent State	13-2	27-11

NCAA tournament: College World Series

Date	Opponent	Site/stadium	Score	Overall record
June 8	vs. Texas A&M	Rosenblatt Stadium	7-3	28-11
June 12	vs. Maine	Rosenblatt Stadium	12-0	29-11
June 13	vs. Southern California	Rosenblatt Stadium	6-5	30-11
June 15	vs. Missouri	Rosenblatt Stadium	1-4	30-12
June 17	vs. Missouri	Rosenblatt Stadium	5-1	31-12

== Awards and honors ==
Bill Davis

- All College World Series Team

Dave Hoffman

- All-College World Series Team

Dewey Markus

- All-College World Series Team

Joe Pollack

- All-Big Ten First Team
- All-College World Series Team

Ron Wojciak

- All-America First Team
- All-Big Ten First Team
- All-College World Series Team
