= Bee Lawler =

American athlete and coach (1891–1973)

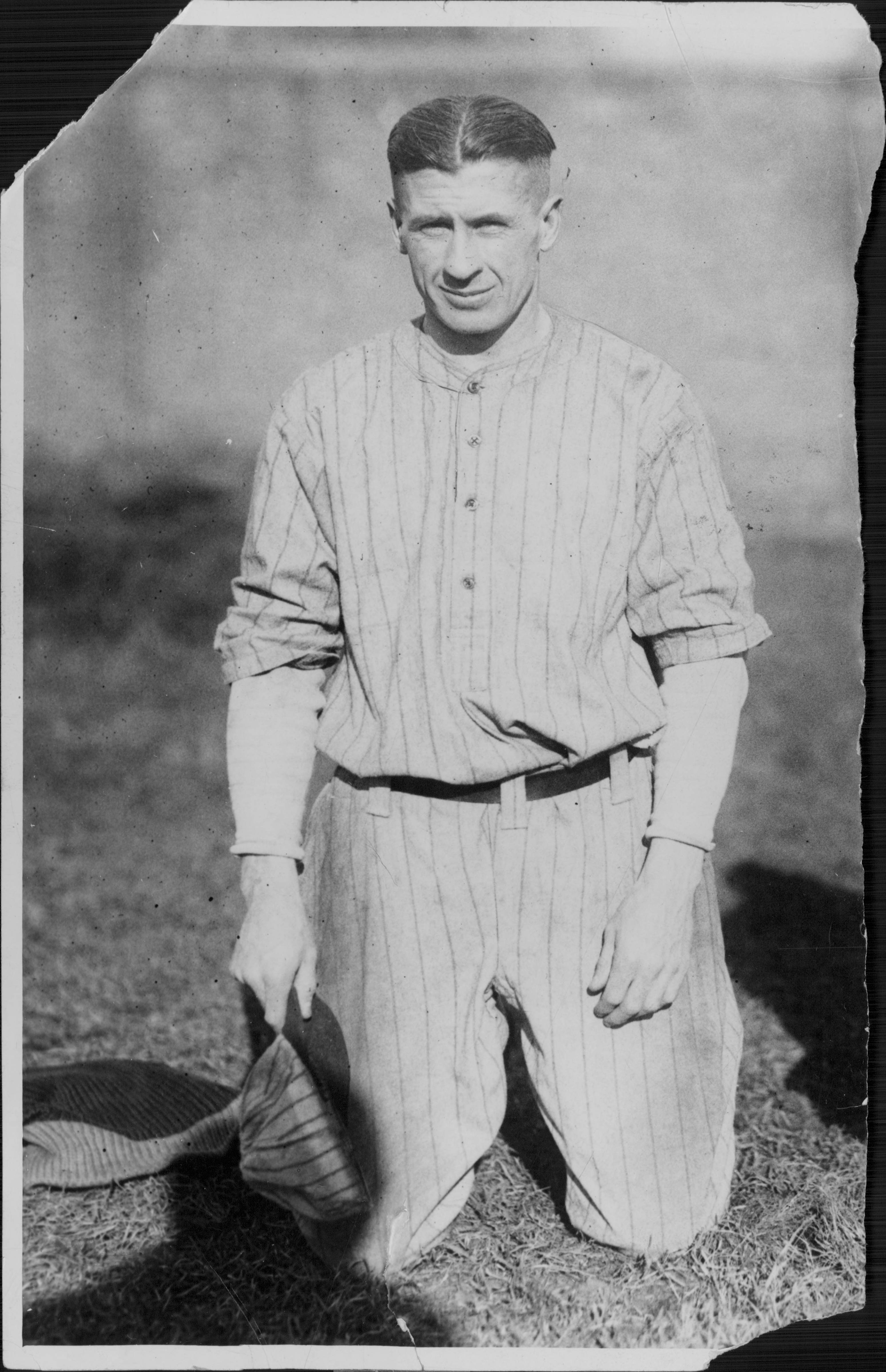

Biographical details
- Born: December 8, 1891; Minneapolis, Minnesota, U.S.
- Died: January 10, 1973 (aged 81); Saint Paul, Minnesota, U.S.

Playing career

Football
- 1911–1913: Minnesota

Baseball
- 1912–1914: Minnesota
- 1915: Winnipeg Maroons
- 1915: Fargo-Moorhead Graingrowers
- 1916: Superior Red Sox

Basketball
- 1912–1915: Minnesota

Coaching career (HC unless noted)

Football
- 1919: St. Thomas (MN)

Baseball
- 1922: Minnesota

Head coaching record
- Overall: 3–2–1 (football); 6–11 (baseball)

Lawrence Kelly "Bee" Lawler (December 8, 1891 – June 10, 1973) was an American football, basketball and baseball player and coach. He played college football at the University of Minnesota in Minneapolis from 1911 to 1913, where he was also a baseball and basketball player.

Lawler was named captain of the Minnesota Golden Gophers men's basketball team in 1915. He later served as the head football coach at University of St. Thomas in Saint Paul, Minnesota in 1919 and as the head baseball coach at Minnesota in 1922.
