= 1964 Arizona State Sun Devils baseball team =

American college baseball season

1964 Arizona State Sun Devils baseball

WAC champions NCAA District 7 playoffs champions

College World Series, 1–2
- Conference: Western Athletic Conference
- Record: 44–7 (11–1 WAC)
- Head coach: Bobby Winkles (5th year)
- Home stadium: Phoenix Municipal Stadium

1964 Western Athletic Conference baseball standings
	Conf.				Overall
Team	W		L	PCT	W		L	PCT
Northern
Utah ‍‍‍	6	–	4	.600	14	–	16	.467
Wyoming ‍‍‍	5	–	5	.500	16	–	16	.500
BYU ‍‍‍	4	–	6	.400	18	–	24	.429
Southern
No. 5 Arizona State ‍†‍‍^{y}	11	–	1	.917	44	–	7	.863
No. 20 Arizona ‍‍‍	7	–	5	.583	31	–	13	.705
New Mexico ‍‍‍	0	–	12	.000	8	–	29	.216
† – Conference champion y – Invited to the NCAA tournament As of June 30, 1964; Rankings from Collegiate Baseball

The 1964 Arizona State Sun Devils baseball team represented Arizona State University in the 1964 NCAA University Division baseball season. The Sun Devils played their home games at Phoenix Municipal Stadium, and played as part of the Western Athletic Conference. The team was coached by Bobby Winkles in his fifth season as head coach at Arizona State.

The Sun Devils reached the College World Series, their first appearance in Omaha, where they finished tied for fifth place after winning a second round game against Ole Miss and losing an opening round game to eventual runner-up Missouri and an elimination game to Maine.

== Personnel ==
=== Roster ===
1964 Arizona State Sun Devils roster
Pitchers: - Sam Cook; - Skip Hancock; - Ron Lea; - Tom MacDougal; - Jim Merrick; - John Pavlik; Catchers: - Ray Stadler	Infielders: - Sal Bando; - Jan Kleinman; - Luis Lagunas; - John Ruedy; Outfielders: - Jim Gretta; - Jack Handley; - Dick Heiden; - Merrill Hyde	Unknown: - Tony Alesci; - Dave Cartun; - Mike Gallagher; - Lad Nemececk; - Rich Oliver; - Jack Smitheran; - John Torok; - Doug Westley; - Ronald Roberts Sr

=== Coaches ===
1964 Arizona State Sun Devils baseball coaching staff
- Bobby Winkles - Head coach - 5th year

== Schedule and results ==
Legend
Arizona State win
Arizona State loss

1964 Arizona State Sun Devils baseball game log
Regular season

March
Date	Opponent	Site/stadium	Score	Overall record	WAC record
Mar 5	Long Beach State*	Phoenix Municipal Stadium • Phoenix, AZ	W 11–8	1–0	
Mar 6	Cal State Los Angeles*	Phoenix Municipal Stadium • Phoenix, AZ	L 5–6	1–1	
Mar 7	Cal State Los Angeles*	Phoenix Municipal Stadium • Phoenix, AZ	L 0–8	1–2	
Mar 7	Cal State Los Angeles*	Phoenix Municipal Stadium • Phoenix, AZ	W 5–0	2–2	
Mar 13	Arizona State College*	Phoenix Municipal Stadium • Phoenix, AZ	W 12–4	3–2	
Mar 14	Arizona State College*	Phoenix Municipal Stadium • Phoenix, AZ	W 6–4	4–2	
Mar 16	Colorado State*	Phoenix Municipal Stadium • Phoenix, AZ	W 12–1	5–2	
Mar 17	Colorado State*	Phoenix Municipal Stadium • Phoenix, AZ	W 15–4	6–2	
Mar 18	Colorado State*	Phoenix Municipal Stadium • Phoenix, AZ	W 17–1	7–2	
Mar 21	Colorado State College*	Phoenix Municipal Stadium • Phoenix, AZ	W 9–1	8–2	
Mar 22	Colorado State College*	Phoenix Municipal Stadium • Phoenix, AZ	W 2–1	9–2	
Mar 23	Wyoming*	Phoenix Municipal Stadium • Phoenix, AZ	W 3–2	10–2	
Mar 24	Wyoming*	Phoenix Municipal Stadium • Phoenix, AZ	W 15–3	11–2	
Mar 25	Wyoming*	Phoenix Municipal Stadium • Phoenix, AZ	W 8–0	12–2	
Mar 26	Michigan*	Phoenix Municipal Stadium • Phoenix, AZ	W 8–1	13–2	
Mar 27	Michigan*	Phoenix Municipal Stadium • Phoenix, AZ	W 7–3	14–2	
Mar 28	Michigan*	Phoenix Municipal Stadium • Phoenix, AZ	W 15–5	15–2	
Mar 28	Michigan*	Phoenix Municipal Stadium • Phoenix, AZ	W 9–1	16–2	
Mar 30	Wisconsin*	Phoenix Municipal Stadium • Phoenix, AZ	W 5–2	17–2	
Mar 31	Wisconsin*	Phoenix Municipal Stadium • Phoenix, AZ	W 7–4	18–2	

April
Date	Opponent	Site/stadium	Score	Overall record	WAC record
Apr 1	Wisconsin*	Phoenix Municipal Stadium • Phoenix, AZ	L 3–5	18–3	
Apr 2	Utah State*	Phoenix Municipal Stadium • Phoenix, AZ	W 21–4	19–3	
Apr 3	Utah State*	Phoenix Municipal Stadium • Phoenix, AZ	W 13–5	20–3	
Apr 4	Utah State*	Phoenix Municipal Stadium • Phoenix, AZ	W 4–2	21–3	
Apr 4	Utah State*	Phoenix Municipal Stadium • Phoenix, AZ	W 13–3	22–3	
Apr 7	Grand Canyon*	Phoenix Municipal Stadium • Phoenix, AZ	W 8–3	23–3	
Apr 10	Arizona	Phoenix Municipal Stadium • Phoenix, AZ	W 5–3	24–3	1–0
Apr 11	Arizona	Phoenix Municipal Stadium • Phoenix, AZ	W 17–9	25–3	2–0
Apr 11	Arizona	Phoenix Municipal Stadium • Phoenix, AZ	W 9–4	26–3	3–0
Apr 14	at Grand Canyon*	GCU Ballpark • Phoenix, AZ	W 10–3	27–3	
Apr 15	at Grand Canyon*	GCU Ballpark • Phoenix, AZ	W 5–3	28–3	
Apr 17	Sul Ross*	Phoenix Municipal Stadium • Phoenix, AZ	W 11–2	29–3	
Apr 18	Sul Ross*	Phoenix Municipal Stadium • Phoenix, AZ	L 5–16	29–4	
Apr 24	New Mexico	Phoenix Municipal Stadium • Phoenix, AZ	W 14–1	30–4	4–0
Apr 25	New Mexico	Phoenix Municipal Stadium • Phoenix, AZ	W 20–1	31–4	5–0
Apr 25	New Mexico	Phoenix Municipal Stadium • Phoenix, AZ	W 3–1	32–4	6–0

May
Date	Opponent	Site/stadium	Score	Overall record	WAC record
May 1	at Arizona	UA Field • Tucson, AZ	L 0–1^{10}	32–5	6–1
May 2	at Arizona	UA Field • Tucson, AZ	W 3–2	33–5	7–1
May 2	at Arizona	UA Field • Tucson, AZ	W 6–2	34–5	8–1
May 8	at New Mexico	Albuquerque, NM	W 11–3	35–5	9–1
May 9	at New Mexico	Albuquerque, NM	W 12–6	36–5	10–1
May 9	at New Mexico	Albuquerque, NM	W 17–4	37–5	11–1
May 16	New Mexico State*	Phoenix Municipal Stadium • Phoenix, AZ	W 7–0^{7}	38–5	
May 16	New Mexico State*	Phoenix Municipal Stadium • Phoenix, AZ	W 6–5^{7}	39–5	

Postseason

WAC Championship
Date	Opponent	Site/stadium	Score	Overall record	Series record
May 22	at Utah	W 7–4	40–5	1–0	
May 23	at Utah	W 13–5	41–5	2–0	

NCAA District 7 playoffs
Date	Opponent	Site/stadium	Score	Overall record	Reg Record
June 1	Air Force	Falcon Baseball Field • Colorado Springs, CO	W 6–1	42–5	1–0
June 2	Air Force	Falcon Baseball Field • Colorado Springs, CO	W 7–6	43–5	2–0

College World Series
Date	Opponent	Site/stadium	Score	Overall record	CWS record
June 9	Missouri	Johnny Rosenblatt Stadium • Omaha, NE	L 0–7	43–6	0–1
June 10	Ole Miss	Johnny Rosenblatt Stadium • Omaha, NE	W 5–0	44–6	1–1
June 12	Maine	Johnny Rosenblatt Stadium • Omaha, NE	L 2–4	44–7	1–2
