= 1964 NCAA University Division baseball tournament =

US college baseball tournament

- Season: 1964
- Teams: 21
- Finals site: Johnny Rosenblatt Stadium; Omaha, Nebraska
- Champions: Minnesota (3rd title)
- Runner-up: Missouri (6th CWS Appearance)
- Winning coach: Dick Siebert (3rd title)
- MOP: Joe Ferris (Maine)

The 1964 NCAA University Division baseball tournament was played at the end of the 1964 NCAA University Division baseball season in the United States to determine the national champion of college baseball. The tournament concluded with eight teams competing in the College World Series, a double-elimination tournament in its eighteenth year. Eight regional districts sent representatives to the College World Series with preliminary rounds within each district serving to determine each representative. These events would later become known as regionals. Each district had its own format for selecting teams, resulting in 21 teams participating in the tournament at the conclusion of their regular season, and in some cases, after a conference tournament. The College World Series was held in Omaha, NE from June 8 to June 18. The eighteenth tournament's champion was Minnesota, coached by Dick Siebert. The Most Outstanding Player was Joe Ferris of third place Maine.

== Regionals ==
The opening rounds of the tournament were played across seven district sites across the country, each consisting of a field of two to four teams. Each district tournament, except District 2 and District 5, was double-elimination. The winners of each district advanced to the College World Series.

Bold indicates winner. * indicates extra innings.

=== District 1 at Boston, Massachusetts ===
Finals
**Maine**	**9**	**4**	—
Northeastern	5	2	—

=== District 2 at Princeton, New Jersey ===
Semifinals
**Ithaca**	**6**
St. John's	3
**Seton Hall**	**8**
La Salle	3

Finals
Ithaca	3
**Seton Hall**	**8**

=== District 3 at Gastonia, North Carolina ===
Upper round 1
**Ole Miss**	**11**
West Virginia	0
**North Carolina**	**8**
East Carolina	0
Lower round 1
West Virginia	5
**East Carolina**	**6**

Upper final
**Ole Miss**	**4**
North Carolina	3
Lower final
**North Carolina**	**13**
East Carolina	2

Final
**Ole Miss**	**13**	—
North Carolina	1	—

=== District 4 at Kent, Ohio ===
Finals
**Minnesota**	**7**	**13**	—
Kent State	4	2	—

=== District 5 at Columbia, Missouri ===
Finals
Saint Louis	1	1	—
**Missouri**	1	**2**	—

=== District 6 ===
Texas A&M automatically qualified for the College World Series out of District 6.

=== District 7 at Colorado Springs, Colorado ===
Semifinal				Final
				**Arizona State**	**6**	**7**	—
Colorado State College ^	1	1	—	Air Force	1	6	—
**Air Force**	**3**	**7**	—

^ Note: Colorado State College of Education became Northern Colorado University in 1970.

=== District 8 at Los Angeles, California ===
Semifinal				Final
				Oregon	0	3	—
Cal Poly Pomona	3	3	—	**Southern California**	**5**	**9**	—
**Southern California**	**12**	**5**	—

== College World Series ==
=== Participants ===
School	Conference	Record (conference)	Head coach	CWS appearances	CWS best finish	CWS record
Arizona State	WAC	43–5 (11–1)	Bobby Winkles	0 (last: none)	none	0–0
Maine	Yankee	18–6 (8–2)	Jack Butterfield	0 (last: none)	none	0–0
Minnesota	Big 10	27–11 (11–3)	Dick Siebert	2 (last: 1960)	1st (1956, 1960)	10–2
Ole Miss	SEC	24–5 (11–1)	Tom Swayze	1 (last: 1956)	4th (1956)	2–2
Missouri	Big 8	23–3 (19–0)	Hi Simmons	5 (last: 1963)	1st (1954)	14–9
Seton Hall	n/a	24–3 (n/a)	Owen Carroll	0 (last: none)	none	0–0
Southern California	CIBA	39–13 (17–3)	Rod Dedeaux	8 (last: 1963)	1st (1948, 1958, 1961, 1963)	24–11
Texas A&M	SWC	19–6 (12–3)	Tom Chandler	1 (last: 1951)	6th (1951)	1–2

=== Results ===
==== Bracket ====
Upper round 1
Maine	5
Seton Hall	1
Minnesota	7
Texas A&M	3
Southern California	3
Ole Miss	2
Missouri	7
Arizona State	0

Upper round 2
Maine	0
Minnesota	12
Southern California	3
Missouri	2
Lower round 1
Seton Hall	14
Texas A&M	5
Arizona State	5
Ole Miss	0

Upper final
Minnesota	6
Southern California	5
Lower round 2
Missouri	3
Seton Hall	1
Maine	4
Arizona State	2

Semifinals
Minnesota	1
Missouri	4
Maine	2
Southern California	1

Preliminary final
Missouri	2
Maine	1

Final
Missouri	1
Minnesota	5

==== Game results ====
Date	Game	Winner	Score	Loser	Notes
June 8	Game 1	Maine	5–1	Seton Hall	
June 8	Game 2	Minnesota	7–3	Texas A&M	
June 9	Game 3	Southern California	3–2	Ole Miss	
June 9	Game 4	Missouri	7–0	Arizona State	
June 10	Game 5	Seton Hall	14–5	Texas A&M	Texas A&M eliminated
June 10	Game 6	Arizona State	5–0	Ole Miss	Ole Miss eliminated
June 12	Game 7	Minnesota	12–0	Maine	
June 12	Game 8	Southern California	3–2	Missouri	
June 13	Game 9	Missouri	3–1	Seton Hall	Seton Hall eliminated
June 12	Game 10	Maine	4–2	Arizona State	Arizona State eliminated
June 13	Game 11	Minnesota	6–5	Southern California	
June 15	Game 12	Missouri	4–1	Minnesota	
June 15	Game 13	Maine	2–1	Southern California	Southern California eliminated
June 17	Game 14	Missouri	2–1	Maine	Maine eliminated
June 18	Final	Minnesota	5–1	Missouri	Minnesota wins CWS

=== All-Tournament Team ===
The following players were members of the All-Tournament Team.

Position	Player	School
P	Joe Ferris (MOP)	Maine
P	Joe Pollack	Minnesota
C	Ron Wojciak	Minnesota
1B	Bill Davis	Minnesota
2B	Dewey Markus	Minnesota
3B	Dave Thompson	Maine
SS	Gary Sutherland	USC
OF	Willie Brown	USC
OF	Dave Hoffman	Minnesota
OF	Gary Woods	Missouri

=== Notable players ===
- Arizona State: Sal Bando, Fred Rico, Al Schmelz
- Maine:
- Minnesota: Frank Brosseau, Bill Davis
- Ole Miss: Don Kessinger
- Missouri: Dennis Musgraves, John Sevcik
- Seton Hall: Bill Henry
- Southern California: Ray Lamb, Gary Sutherland
- Texas A&M:
