= Ingrain, Inc. =

- Industry: Oilfield services Geophysical imaging
- Founded: 2007; 19 years ago
- Defunct: July 2017; 8 years ago
- Fate: Acquired by Halliburton
- Headquarters: Houston, Texas, United States
- Key people: Helge Tveit, Chairman; Marcus Ganz, CEO; Barry Stewart, CFO; Boaz Nur, VP of Ops

Ingrain, Inc. operated digital rock physics laboratories in Houston, Brazil, Colombia, and Abu Dhabi with imaging technology that allowed it to compute the physical properties and fluid flow characteristics of rocks from petroleum reservoirs, including porosity, absolute and relative permeability, electrical resistivity and conductivity, and elasticity.

Financial backers included Energy Ventures, a venture capital firm specializing in upstream technology.

== History ==
The company was co-founded in 2007 by Amos Nur, Ph.D., Jack Dvorkin, Ph.D., William Bosl, Ph.D., and Henrique Tono, Ph.D.

In 2009, the company formed a partnership with Knowledge Reservoir.

In August 2012, the company was awarded a contract by the Colombian government’s National Hydrocarbons Agency to digitize, characterize, and catalog the high-volume of core in storage to better assess its hydrocarbon potential. Ingrain partnered with Carl Zeiss AG on the project.

In July 2017, the company was acquired by Halliburton.
