= Ron Walker (Australian footballer) =

Australian rules footballer

Personal information
- Full name: Ron Walker
- Born: 13 April 1927
- Died: 5 March 2005 (aged 77)
- Original team: Warrnambool
- Height: 185 cm (6 ft 1 in)
- Weight: 87 kg (192 lb)

Playing career^{1}
Years	Club	Games (Goals)
1951	South Melbourne	2 (0)
- ^{1} Playing statistics correct to the end of 1951.

Ron Walker (13 April 1927 – 5 March 2005) was an Australian rules footballer who played with South Melbourne in the Victorian Football League (VFL).
