= Big Ron =

Big Ron may refer to:

- Big Ron Studd, American professional wrestler
- Big Ron Harris, American professional wrestler
- Big Ron (EastEnders), soap opera character
- A nickname for former football player and manager Ron Atkinson
- Big Ronnie, a character in The Unbelievable GwenPool and Spider-Woman
- Ronnie Coleman, American professional bodybuilder
