= Liat Yossifor =

Israeli-born American painter (born 1974)

- Born: 1974 (age 51–52); Tel Aviv, Israel
- Education: San Francisco Art Institute (BFA), University of California, Irvine (MFA)
- Known for: Painting
- Movement: Abstract Art

Liat Yossifor (born 1974) is an Israeli-born American abstract painter. She lives in Los Angeles, California.

== Life and education ==
Liat Yossifor was born in 1974, in Tel Aviv, Israel. She relocated to the United States in 1989, where she pursued a career in art.

She obtained a Bachelor of Fine Arts degree in 1996 from the San Francisco Art Institute, and a Master of Fine Arts degree in 2002 from the University of California, Irvine.

== Career ==
Yossifor had a critically acclaimed solo exhibition Accumulation of Wait (2026), at Michael Benevento Gallery, Los Angeles, CA. Yossifor also had a solo exhibition Double Life (2010), at Galerie Anita Beckers, in Frankfurt, Germany, which featured figurative work made during her residency at Frankfurter Kunstverein.

Yossifor was a Robert Rauschenberg Foundation resident in Captiva Island, Florida, in 2020, and was a Villa Aurora & Thomas Mann House Berlin Fellow in 2022.

Her artwork is part of the collections at Los Angeles County Museum of Art (LACMA) the Hammer Museum in Los Angeles, California, and the Margulies Collection at the Warehouse in Miami, Florida.

== Artistic style and themes ==
Yossifor is a painter who paints textural monochromatic abstractions. Her work includes a physical engagement with the medium, resulting in layered surfaces that have movement and depth.

Yossifor's paintings are characterized by a process that emphasizes the physicality of creation. She often works within self-imposed time constraints, completing pieces rapidly to maintain the immediacy and vitality of her gestures. Her technique involves the application of thick layers of oil paint, that she manipulates, which results in paintings that are sculptural and painterly, and a nod to figurative work. This approach is built upon the history of American monochrome painting.

Yossifor's work explores form and movement through the physical act of creation with control and spontaneity. Her work engages the materiality of paint and abstract forms.

== Publications ==
- Yossifor, Liat (2007). Liat Yossifor: The Tender Among Us (exhibition catalogue). Pomona College Museum of Art, Montgomery Art Center. ISBN 978-0-9786996-3-5.
- Yossifor, Liat (September 12, 2015). Time Turning Paint (exhibition catalogue). Pitzer College Art Galleries. ISBN 978-0-9966445-1-8.
- Yossifor, Liat; Lang, Karen; Michno, Christopher; Rollig, Stella; Schad, Ed (April 5, 2016). Movements: Liat Yossifor. Los Angeles, California: DoppelHouse Press. ISBN 978-0983254072.
- Yossifor, Liat (2018). Liat Yossifor (exhibition catalogue). New York City, New York: Miles McEnery Gallery. ISBN 978-0-9994871-4-3.
