= Ron Ward (cricketer) =

Australian cricketer

Personal information
- Full name: Ronald Egbert Ward
- Born: 7 May 1905; Adelaide, South Australia
- Died: 8 November 2000 (aged 95); Launceston, Tasmania
- Batting: Right-handed

Domestic team information
- Years: Team
- 1930/31–1935/36: Tasmania
- Source: Cricinfo, 6 March 2016

Ronald Egbert Ward (7 May 1905 – 8 November 2000) was an Australian cricketer. He played five first-class matches for Tasmania between 1930 and 1936.

Ward was born at Adelaide in 1905. He died at Launceston, Tasmania in 2000 aged 95. Ward was a flight lieutenant for the Royal Australian Air Force during World War II, and was awarded a Bronze Star Medal.
