= 1964 USC Trojans baseball team =

American college baseball season

1964 USC Trojans baseball

CIBA Champions District VIII Champions

College World Series, 5th
- Conference: California Intercollegiate Baseball Association
- Record: 34–11 (17–3 CIBA)
- Head coach: Rod Dedeaux (23rd season)
- Home stadium: Bovard Field

1964 Athletic Association of Western Universities baseball standings
	Conf.						Overall
Team	W		L		T	PCT	W		L		T	PCT
North Division
No. 9 Oregon ‍†‍‍^{y}	11	–	5	–	0	.688	31	–	11	–	0	.738
No. 21 Washington State ‍‍‍	10	–	6	–	0	.625	31	–	9	–	0	.775
No. 22 Oregon State ‍‍‍	8	–	8	–	0	.500	25	–	11	–	0	.694
Washington ‍‍‍	6	–	10	–	0	.375	12	–	14	–	0	.462
Idaho ‍‍‍	5	–	11	–	0	.313	0	–	0	–	0	–
California Intercollegiate Baseball Association
No. 4 USC ‍†‍‍^{y}	17	–	3	–	0	.850	34	–	11	–	0	.756
No. 10 Santa Clara ‍‍‍	16	–	4	–	0	.800	28	–	8	–	0	.778
No. 19 UCLA ‍‍‍	13	–	7	–	0	.650	35	–	16	–	2	.679
UC Santa Barbara ‍‍‍	5	–	15	–	0	.250	12	–	26	–	0	.316
California ‍‍‍	5	–	15	–	0	.250	25	–	17	–	0	.595
Stanford ‍‍‍	4	–	16	–	0	.200	20	–	24	–	0	.455
† – Conference champion y – Invited to the NCAA tournament As of June 30, 1964; Rankings from Collegiate Baseball

The 1964 USC Trojans baseball team represented the University of Southern California in the 1964 NCAA University Division baseball season. The Trojans played their home games at Bovard Field. The team was coached by Rod Dedeaux in his 23rd year at USC.

The Trojans won the California Intercollegiate Baseball Association championship and the District VIII Playoff to advance to the College World Series, where they were defeated by the Maine Black Bears.

== Roster ==
1964 USC Trojans baseball team
Players
Coaches

#	Pos.	Name	B/T	Height	Weight	Year	Home town
	INF	Joe Austin	R/R	6 ft 3 in (1.91 m)	205 lb (93 kg)	Jr
	OF	Willie Brown	/	—	—	Sr
	P	Ronald Cook	/	—	—	So
	INF	Gary Coscarart	/	—	—	Jr
		Armando DeCastro	/	—	—	So
	C	Stephen DeLeau	/	—	—	Sr
	LHP	Lawrence Fisher	/L	—	—	Jr
		Doug Gabrielson	/	—	—	So
	INF	Ed Gagle	/	—	—	Jr
	RHP	Cliff Goodrich	/R	—	—	Sr
	OF	Fred Hill	/	—	—
	C	Bud Hollowell	R/R	6 ft 0 in (1.83 m)	190 lb (86 kg)	Sr	Long Beach, California
	C	Don Johnson	R/R	6 ft 0 in (1.83 m)	190 lb (86 kg)	Jr	Montebello, California
	RHP	Ray Lamb	R/R	6 ft 1 in (1.85 m)	170 lb (77 kg)	So	Glendale, California
	LHP	Al Lasas	/L	—	—	Jr
		Barry Nelson	/	—	—
	RHP	Walt Peterson	/R	—	—
	C	Martin Poscovich	/	—	—	Jr
	OF	James Rees	L/R	6 ft 1 in (1.85 m)	185 lb (84 kg)
	INF	Larry Sandel	/	—	—	Sr
	RHP	Ron Scott	/R	—	—
	RHP	Robert Selleck	/R	—	—
	OF	Fred Shuey	R/R	6 ft 0 in (1.83 m)	170 lb (77 kg)
	OF	Mike Smith	/	—	—
		Joe Stucker	/	—	—
	INF	Gary Sutherland	R/R	6 ft 0 in (1.83 m)	185 lb (84 kg)		Glendale, California
		Kendrick Walker	/	—	—	Jr
	LHP	Duane White	/L	—	—	Jr
	INF	Daryl Wilkins	/	—	—	Jr
	INF	Rob Withers	/	—	—	Jr

Head coach

Rod Dedeaux

Assistant coach(es)

Legend

- (C) Team captain
- (S) Suspended
- (I) Ineligible
- Injured
- Current redshirt

== Schedule ==
1964 USC Trojans baseball game log
Regular season
February (1–0)

#	Date	Opponent	Site/stadium	Score	Overall record	CIBA record
1	February 25	at San Fernando Valley State	Matador Field • Northridge, California	12–4	1–0	0–0

March (9–4)

#	Date	Opponent	Site/stadium	Score	Overall record	CIBA record
2	March 2	Cal Western	Bovard Field • Los Angeles, California	0–6	1–1	0–0
3	March 3	Long Beach State	Bovard Field • Los Angeles, California	5–3	2–1	0–0
4	March 6	San Diego	Bovard Field • Los Angeles, California	15–4	3–1	0–0
5	March 7	San Fernando Valley State	Bovard Field • Los Angeles, California	5–9	3–2	0–0
6	March 9	Loyola Marymount	Bovard Field • Los Angeles, California	5–1	4–2	0–0
7	March 13	at Santa Barbara	Campus Diamond • Santa Barbara, California	7–0	5–2	1–0
8	March 14	Santa Barbara	Bovard Field • Los Angeles, California	8–2	6–2	2–0
9	March 14	San Diego State	Bovard Field • Los Angeles, California	5–0	7–2	2–0
10	March 17	Cal State Los Angeles	Bovard Field • Los Angeles, California	2–8	7–3	2–0
11	March 20	at Fresno State	Unknown • Fresno, California	14–7	8–3	2–0
12	March 20	at Fresno State	Unknown • Fresno, California	3–7	8–4	2–0
13	March 30	Pepperdine	Bovard Field • Los Angeles, California	3–2	9–4	2–0
14	March 31	BYU	Bovard Field • Los Angeles, California	8–6	10–4	2–0

April (12–4)

#	Date	Opponent	Site/stadium	Score	Overall record	CIBA record
15	April 3	at UCLA	Sawtelle Field • Los Angeles, California	2–3	10–5	2–1
16	April 4	at UCLA	Sawtelle Field • Los Angeles, California	8–4	11–5	3–1
17	April 6	Cal State Los Angeles	Bovard Field • Los Angeles, California	4–3	12–5	3–1
18	April 7	Cal Poly Pomona	Bovard Field • Los Angeles, California	7–2	12–6	3–1
19	April 11	at Santa Clara	Buck Shaw Stadium • Santa Clara, California	2–7	12–7	3–2
20	April 11	at Santa Clara	Buck Shaw Stadium • Santa Clara, California	3–0	13–7	4–2
21	April 13	at Stanford	Sunken Diamond • Stanford, California	3–2	14–7	5–2
22	April 14	at Long Beach State	Blair Field • Long Beach, California	8–9	14–8	5–2
23	April 17	Santa Clara	Bovard Field • Los Angeles, California	7–3	15–8	6–2
24	April 18	California	Bovard Field • Los Angeles, California	10–7	16–8	7–2
25	April 18	California	Bovard Field • Los Angeles, California	4–2	17–8	8–2
26	April 20	Cal Poly Pomona	Bovard Field • Los Angeles, California	14–1	18–8	8–2
27	April 24	Santa Clara	Bovard Field • Los Angeles, California	8–3	19–8	9–2
28	April 25	Stanford	Bovard Field • Los Angeles, California	5–4	20–8	10–2
29	April 25	Stanford	Bovard Field • Los Angeles, California	115–4	21–8	11–2
30	April 28	Santa Barbara	Bovard Field • Los Angeles, California	10–1	22–8	12–2

May (6–1)

#	Date	Opponent	Site/stadium	Score	Overall record	CIBA record
31	May 1	UCLA	Bovard Field • Los Angeles, California	2–7	22–9	12–3
32	May 2	UCLA	Bovard Field • Los Angeles, California	8–7	23–9	13–3
33	May 5	at Santa Barbara	Campus Diamond • Santa Barbara, California	13–5	24–9	14–3
34	May 8	at Stanford	Sunken Diamond • Stanford, California	9–2	25–9	15–3
35	May 9	at California	Edwards Field • Berkeley, California	8–2	26–9	16–3
36	May 9	at California	Edwards Field • Berkeley, California	4–3	27–9	17–3
37	May 15	Pepperdine	Bovard Field • Los Angeles, California	3–2	28–9	17–3

Postseason
District VIII Playoff (4–0)

#	Date	Opponent	Site/stadium	Score	Overall record	CIBA record
38	May 22	Cal Poly Pomona	Bovard Field • Los Angeles, California	12–3	29–9	17–3
39	May 23	Cal Poly Pomona	Bovard Field • Los Angeles, California	5–2	30–9	17–3
40	May 29	Oregon	Bovard Field • Los Angeles, California	5–0	31–9	17–3
41	May 30	Oregon	Bovard Field • Los Angeles, California	9–3	32–9	17–3

College World Series (2–2)

#	Date	Opponent	Site/stadium	Score	Overall record	CIBA record
42	June 9	vs Ole Miss	Omaha Municipal Stadium • Omaha, Nebraska	3–2	33–9	17–3
43	June 12	vs Missouri	Omaha Municipal Stadium • Omaha, Nebraska	3–2	34–9	17–3
44	June 13	vs Minnesota	Omaha Municipal Stadium • Omaha, Nebraska	5–6	34–10	17–3
45	June 15	vs Maine	Omaha Municipal Stadium • Omaha, Nebraska	1–2	34–11	17–3

== Awards and honors ==
Joe Austin

- First Team All-CIBA

Willie Brown

- College World Series All-Tournament Team
- Second Team All-CIBA

Bud Hollowell

- Second Team All-American American Baseball Coaches Association
- Second Team All-CIBA

Marty Piscovich

- Honorable Mention All-CIBA

Walt Peterson

- First Team All-American American Baseball Coaches Association
- First Team All-American The Sports Network
- First Team All-CIBA

Larry Sandel

- Second Team All-CIBA

Gary Sutherland

- Third Team All-American American Baseball Coaches Association
- College World Series All-Tournament Team
- First Team All-CIBA
