= Dennis Musgraves =

American baseball player (born 1943)

- Pitcher
- Born: December 25, 1943 (age 82); Indianapolis, Indiana
- Batted: Right Threw: Right

MLB debut
- July 9, 1965, for the New York Mets

Last MLB appearance
- July 29, 1965, for the New York Mets

MLB statistics
- Win–loss record: 0–0
- Earned run average: 0.56
- Innings: 16
- Stats at Baseball Reference

Teams
- New York Mets (1965)

Dennis Eugene Musgraves (born December 25, 1943) is an American former professional baseball player, a right-handed pitcher who appeared in five Major League Baseball games as a member of the 1965 New York Mets.

Musgraves' father, Wilson, pitched in the Boston Braves farm system in 1946 and 1947. Musgraves attended Hazelwood High School in Missouri and the University of Missouri where he pitched for the Missouri Tigers baseball team. By the end of his sophomore year at Missouri, he had thrown a no-hitter against Kansas State and helped lead the Tigers to the finals of the 1964 College World Series. He signed with the Mets in June 1964 and received a signing bonus of $100,000 (equivalent to $1,038,000 in 2025), the largest bonus the Mets had ever paid up to that point.

He stood 6 feet 4 inches (1.93 m) tall and weighed 188 pounds (85 kg). All of Musgraves' Major League appearances occurred during July 1965. As a reliever, he yielded only four total hits in nine innings in stints against the Houston Astros, St. Louis Cardinals, Milwaukee Braves and Philadelphia Phillies. In his fifth game, a start against the Chicago Cubs on July 29, 1965, at Wrigley Field, Musgraves went seven full innings and gave up his first (and only) earned run in Major League Baseball on a bunt single by Doug Clemens in the fifth inning, but then blanked the Cubs the rest of the way. In the top of the eighth inning, he was replaced by pinch hitter Joe Christopher. Chicago won the game 2–1 in extra innings.

The rest of his career would be spent in minor league baseball, continuing in the Mets' system through 1970 and then retiring after a stint with the 1971 Omaha Royals. Musgraves' Major League totals included only 11 hits allowed in 16 innings pitched, with seven bases on balls and 11 strikeouts.
