= Ron Wood (footballer, born 1925) =

English footballer

Personal information
- Full name: William Ronald Wood
- Date of birth: 11 November 1925
- Place of birth: Manchester, England
- Date of death: 2012 (aged 86–87)
- Position: Inside forward

Senior career*
Years	Team	Apps	(Gls)
- Droylsden
1949–1950	Wrexham	16	(5)
- * Club domestic league appearances and goals

William Ronald Wood (11 November 1925 – 2012) was an English professional footballer who played as an inside forward. He made appearances in the English Football League for Wrexham in 1949 and 1950.
