= Ron Williams (footballer) =

Australian rules footballer (1917–1987)

Personal information
- Full name: Ron Williams
- Born: 30 June 1917
- Died: 11 December 1987 (aged 70)
- Original team: Prahran
- Height: 174 cm (5 ft 9 in)
- Weight: 66 kg (146 lb)

Playing career^{1}
Years	Club	Games (Goals)
1945	St Kilda	7 (0)
- ^{1} Playing statistics correct to the end of 1945.

Ron Williams (30 June 1917 – 11 December 1987) was an Australian rules footballer who played with St Kilda in the Victorian Football League (VFL).
