= Hagai Ron =

Israeli paleomagnetic researcher

- חגי רון
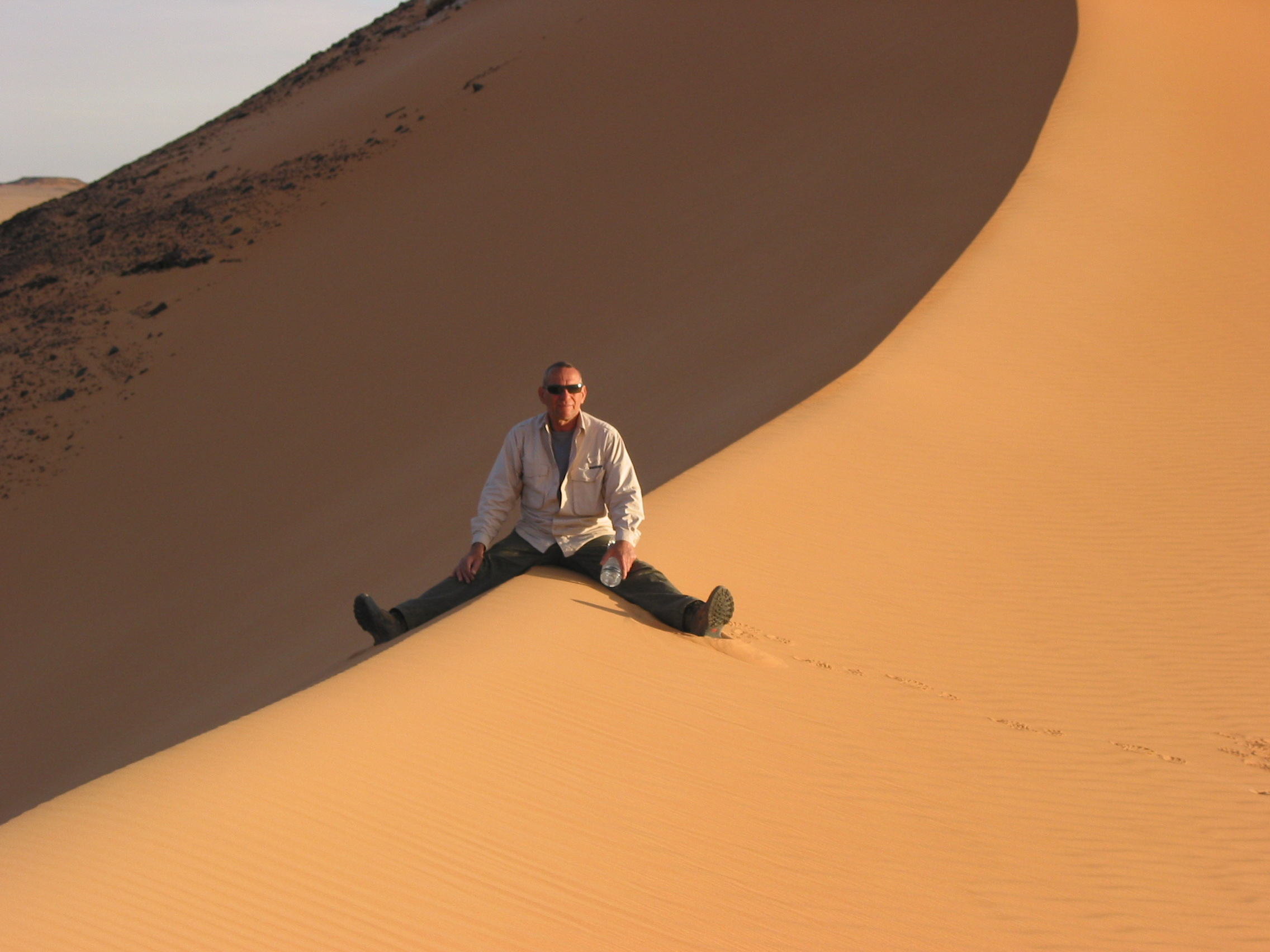
- Ron in 2005 at the Western Desert
- Born: September 6, 1944; Beith Ha'Arava, Mandatory Palestine
- Died: September 10, 2012 (aged 68); Kabri, Israel,
- Citizenship: Israeli
- Education: The Hebrew University of Jerusalem
- Known for: the founding father of paleomagnetic research in Israel
- Scientific career
- Fields: Geology; geophysics
- Workplaces: Geophysical Institute of Israel, The Hebrew University of Jerusalem, Stanford University

Hagai Ron (Hebrew: חגי רון; September 6, 1944 – September 10, 2012) was a professor at the Institute of Earth Sciences at the Hebrew University of Jerusalem and is considered as the founding father of paleomagnetic research in Israel and a pioneer in the field of the relationship between paleomagnetism and block rotation.

== Biography ==
Ron was born in Kibbutz Beit Ha'Arava in the north of the Dead Sea. In May 1948, when he was three and a half years old, and due to the pressure of the Jordanian army, all the members of the kibbutz and their children were evacuated to Kibbutz Shfayim. After a short time, few of the evacuees, including his parents, founded Kibbutz Kabri in the Western Gallilee. Ron grew up and studied in the kibbutz that was his home throughout his life.

He enlisted in the paratrooper brigade in 1962. After his military service, in 1965 he went for a year of national service in Haifa, in the Machanot Ha'Olim Youth movement, where he met Hadva, his wife. During the Six Day War, he participated with his reserve unit in the battle of Umm-Katef in Sinai Peninsula. During the Yom Kippur War he fought with his unit in the Suez Canal Sector.

Ron studied for all his degrees at the Hebrew University in Jerusalem. He studied for a bachelor's degree between 1969 and 1972, and for his Ms.c degree between 1976 and 1978. His studies for the Ph.D degree (under the guidance of professors Rafi Freund, Amos Nur, and Zvi Garfunkel) between 1979 and 1984. Part of his studies for the Ph.D., in 1980 and 1984, he did at Stanford University, where he was also a postdoctoral fellow in 1985–1986.

At the same time as his undergraduate and graduate studies, he served twice as the secretary of Kibbutz Kabri.

At the height of his academic work, and after having trained many students, some of whom were senior academic staff members themselves, Ron fell ill with a serious illness from which he died a short time later. He was laid to rest in the cemetery of Kibbutz Kabri.

== Research and career ==
In his doctoral thesis, which was published in the mid-1980s, Ron entered the then young field of paleomagnetism research. In this work, he developed innovative research methods, including magnetic measurements of sedimentary rocks, that were used to reconstruct tectonic of blocks rotations between the Galillee faults. These methods were a global breakthrough in the interrelationship between geological fieldwork and geophysics, and are an important landmark in paleomagnetic research in general, even by today's standards. He went on for a post-doctorate at Stanford University, California, and returned to Israel with the means to establish the first paleomagnetic laboratory in Israel, which was established at the Geophysical Institute of Israel - one of the first cryogenic magnetometers in the world was placed in this laboratory, which constituted the latest technology of paleomagnetic research. In 2001, Ron moved with the laboratory to the Earth Sciences Institute at the Hebrew University of Jerusalem. He made significant contributions to the timing of hominid dispersal out of Africa, having nailed down the date of the oldest discoveries in Israel. For that time, "he championed the use of Israeli and Jordanian archeological materials, most notably metallurgical slag deposits, for the study of paleointensity variations in the southern Levant".

=== Main studies ===
His main studies dealt with:

- Brittle deformation and breakage - for the first time in the world proof of rotation of limited blocks in replicas around a vertical axis using paleomagnetic measurements (Freund model). The formation of new faults according to the stress field that has not undergone change and deformation of the oceanic crust.
- Magnetism in present-day lake sediments, and paleomagnetism of dried lakes, as "recordings" of the Earth's magnetic field (Lake Lisan, the Dead Sea and the Sea of Galilee).
- Magnetostratigraphy - creating a stratigraphic column based on the column of rocks, the variation of magnetism in rocks and seismotectonics, along the Dead Sea transform.
- The development of internal structures of the Dead Sea transform based on paleomagnetic studies carried out mainly on volcanic rocks from the late Cenozoic and Pleistocene periods and on sedimentary rocks combined with them, including determination of isotopic ages.
- The development of magnetism in rocks due to metamorphosis processes.
- A paleomagnetic and rock magnetism study of Precambrian bedrock from Timna.
- Archaeomagnetism - determining the absolute strength of the Earth's magnetic field during the last seven thousand years.
- Using paleomagnetism methods to reconstruct past tectonic activity in a wide range of geological settings including: Cyprus, North America, and Israel.
- Incorporating paleomagnetism and rock magnetism in interrelated fields of research like ancient and recent earthquakes, by combining archaeological and geological observations.
- Dating rock sections in prehistoric sites, which include tools, using the magnetism in the rock, and cosmogenic isotopes.

In 2015, the African Archaeological Review dedicated a special issue to Ron's memory. This issue dealt with the study of the Wonderwerk Cave in South Africa. It was Ron's initial paleomagnetic findings from Excavation 1 at this cave that gave the first inkling of the great antiquity of the lowermost layers in that site. These results extended the cave sequence back about one million years earlier than previously thought. Attached to this issue is a list of 35 articles written by Ron, relevant to the field.

=== Study of historical and prehistoric earthquakes ===
At the same time as his main work in the field of paleomagnetism, Ron was interested in everything related to historical and prehistoric earthquakes, and supported through the training he gave in the classroom and in the field to archaeologists and historians who were willing to commit themselves to the effort of reconstructing these earthquakes. He followed excavations at archaeological sites that were known to have been affected by earthquakes in the past (for example Beit Shean, Hippos, Jericho and more). He organized a tour of advanced research students from the Department of Geophysics at Stanford University, led by Prof. Amos Nur, to archaeological sites in Israel and the Kingdom of Jordan, where evidence of earthquakes that damaged them were found, and published with him several articles and abstracts of lectures for conferences in the field. Ron, together with Prof. Amos Nur, produced the award-winning documentary video: "The Walls Came Tumbling Down: "Earthquakes in the Holy Land". In addition, he brought together with Prof. Nur to write a doctoral thesis that was reconstructed for the first time in Israel in a comprehensive way, a historical earthquake (1927).

=== Completion of his studies ===
Towards the end of his life, Ron initiated two new projects that did not come to fruition in his lifetime due to his illness: As part of the deep drilling in the Dead Sea, Ron planned to conduct paleomagnetic research on sediments from the last 200 thousand years, as a direct continuation of similar projects he led during the 1990s and 2000s. In addition, he planned a study on lava flows in the Golan Heights as a means of better understanding the behavior of the geomagnetic field. Ron's students and colleagues completed these studies after his death. Some of Ron's last research was dedicated to a large-scale archaeomagnetic campaign aiming at reconstructing variations in the intensity of the geomagnetic field over the past several millennia from pottery and slag materials. This effort, currently continued by his students, is expected to deliver a brand new dating technique for the archaeological community.
