= Ryohei Ron Tsutsui =

Japanese film producer (born 1977)

Ryohei "Ron" Tsutsui (born July, 1977 in Tokyo) is a Japanese film producer. In December 2006, he set up his own film production company Trixta Co., Ltd. in Yokohama.

== Filmography ==
- Kokoro (2007)
- Konjaku Monogatari: The New Edition (2007)
