= Ron Wells (American football) =

American football player (born 1961)

Ron Wells (born October 2, 1961, in Rantoul, Illinois) is a former American football player. He was inducted into the Fort Lewis College Athletics Hall of Fame as part of the Class of 1996.

== Career ==
A 1979 graduate of Columbine High School in Littleton, CO, he burst onto the Fort Lewis College football scene in 1979 as a freshman quarterback, but left as one of the top linebackers in school history.

A four-year letter winner from 1979 through 1982, Mr. Wells owned school records for most quarterback sacks in a career (27) and in a single season (19 in 1982) at the time of his induction. He ranked third and fourth in the Rocky Mountain Athletic Conference (RMAC) in tackles in his junior and senior seasons respectively.

He earned first team All-RMAC, first team All-NAIA District VII; and Associated Press Little All-America honorable mention as a senior outside linebacker in 1982. As a junior, he garnered All-NAIA District VII and All-RMAC honorable mention at linebacker.

He later signed free agent contracts with the Buffalo Bills of the National Football League (1983), the Denver Gold of the United States Football League (1983) where he spent part of the season on injured reserve, and the USFL's Pittsburgh Maulers (1984). He saw action through the entire pre-season schedule for each team prior to being released.

He returned to Fort Lewis College in 1984 as an assistant defensive coach, and helped the Raiders (now Skyhawks) to the first RMAC Football Championship that season. He is currently a PMP-Sentry in Arizona.

Inducted into the Columbine High School Hall of Fame in 2011

Fort Lewis College All-Century Team
