= 1964 West Virginia Mountaineers baseball team =

American college baseball season

1964 West Virginia Mountaineers baseball

Southern Conference Champions

NCAA District 3 Regionals, 0-2
- Conference: Southern Conference

Ranking
- Coaches: No. 15
- Record: 24-5 (14-2 SoCon)
- Head coach: Steve Harrick (17th season)
- Home stadium: Hawley Field

1964 Southern Conference baseball standings
	Conf.				Overall
Team	W		L	PCT	W		L	PCT
No. 15 West Virginia ‍†‍‍^{y}	14	–	2	.875	24	–	5	.828
Furman ‍‍‍	10	–	3	.769	17	–	11	.607
Davidson ‍‍‍	9	–	5	.643	14	–	13	.519
Virginia Tech ‍‍‍	9	–	6	.600	12	–	10	.545
Richmond ‍‍‍	5	–	7	.417	8	–	11	.421
George Washington ‍‍‍	5	–	8	.385	6	–	12	.333
VMI ‍‍‍	5	–	9	.357	10	–	12	.455
The Citadel ‍‍‍	3	–	10	.231	7	–	12	.368
William & Mary ‍‍‍	2	–	12	.143	2	–	14	.125
† – Conference champion y – Invited to the NCAA Tournament; As of June 30, 1964; Rankings from Collegiate Baseball

The 1964 West Virginia Mountaineers baseball team represented West Virginia University during the 1964 NCAA University Division baseball season. The Mountaineers played their home games at Hawley Field as a member of the Southern Conference. They were led by head coach Steve Harrick, in his 17th season at West Virginia. They would finish the season 24-5, winning the Southern Conference championship and playing in the NCAA District 3 Regionals.
