= Liat Ron =

Liat Ron (Hebrew: ליאת רון) is an Israeli-born American actress, playwright, filmmaker, and dancer. She lives in Long Island, in Great Neck, New York.

== Life and career ==
Liat Ron was born in Israel, to an Iraqi Jewish mother and a Russian Jewish father. At the age of 16, she moved to the United States. She studied at the Circle in the Square Theatre School in New York City.

Ron is a member of the American Zionist Movement (AZM), and she chaired the cultural committee of Dor Hadash (New Generation).

== List of works on stage ==
- Jews and Christians in the End Zone (2000), as actress, Theater for the New City, New York City, New York
- Acharnians (2004), adapted by Ron, and actress as Dicaeopolis, Theatre 3, New York City, New York
- Guts (2011), as playwright, The Ninth Space, New York City, New York

== Filmography ==
- Fear and Now (2025), as film director, screenplay writer, and producer
