= 1964 Seton Hall Pirates baseball team =

American college baseball season

1964 Seton Hall Pirates baseball

District V champions

College World Series, T-3rd
- Conference: Independent
- CB: No. 6
- Record: 25–5
- Head coach: Owen T. Carroll (17th season)
- Home stadium: Owen T. Carroll Field

The 1964 Seton Hall Pirates baseball team represented Seton Hall University in the 1964 NCAA University Division baseball season. The Pirates played their home games at Owen T. Carroll Field. The team was coached by Ownie Carroll in his 17th year as head coach at Seton Hall.

The Pirates won the District 2 Playoff to advance to the College World Series, where they were defeated by the Missouri Tigers.

== Roster ==
1964 Seton Hall Pirates baseball team
Players
Coaches

#	Pos.	Name	B/T	Height	Weight	Year	Home town
	C	Tom Bongiorno	/	—	—
		Butkiewicz	/	—	—
	OF	Mike Cadenazzi	/	—	—
	C	Frank Cushing	/	—	—	Jr
	P	DelMauro	/	—	—
	P	Larry Falcon	/	—	—
		Fischer	/	—	—
		Knothe	/	—	—
	INF	Bill Lennon	/	—	—	Sr
	P	Bill Matusz	/	—	—
	INF	John Monteleone	/	—	—	Sr
	P	Nagy	/	—	—
	OF	Kerry O'Connor	/	—	—	Jr
		Jim Queli	/	—	—	Jr
		John Sielski	/	—	—	Jr
	P	Strong	/	—	—
	INF	Jack Tracy	/	—	—	Sr
	INF	Dan Waraska	/	—	—	Jr
	P	Bill Watson	/	—	—	Sr
	OF	Dick Wieczezak	/	—	—

Head coach

Ownie Carroll

Assistant coach(es)

Legend

- (C) Team captain
- (S) Suspended
- (I) Ineligible
- Injured
- Current redshirt

== Schedule ==
1964 Seton Hall Pirates baseball game log
Regular season
April (–)

#	Date	Opponent	Site/stadium	Score	Overall record
	April 9	at Rutgers	Unknown • Piscataway, New Jersey	6–5	–
	April 21	Ithaca	Owen T. Carroll Field • South Orange, New Jersey	5–4	–
	April 25	Villanova	Owen T. Carroll Field • South Orange, New Jersey	1–0	–
		at Navy	Unknown • Annapolis, Maryland	6–4	–

May (–)

#	Date	Opponent	Site/stadium	Score	Overall record
		Fairleigh Dickinson	Unknown • Unknown	2–3	–
	May 9	at Villanova	Unknown • Unknown	2–3	–
	May 19	at Delaware	Unknown • Newark, Delaware	4–2	–
	May 21	St. John's	Owen T. Carroll Field • South Orange, New Jersey	5–2	–
	May 2	at St. John's	Alley Pond Park • New York, New York	3–2	–
25	May 27	at Army	Doubleday Field • West Point, New York	13–6	22–3

Postseason
NCAA District II Playoff (2–0)

#	Date	Opponent	Site/stadium	Score	Overall record
26	May 29	vs LaSalle	Bill Clarke Field • Princeton, New Jersey	8–3	23–3
27	May 30	vs Ithaca	Bill Clarke Field • Princeton, New Jersey	8–3	24–3

College World Series (1–2)

#	Date	Opponent	Site/stadium	Score	Overall record
28	June 8	vs Maine	Omaha Municipal Stadium • Omaha, Nebraska	1–5	24–4
29	June 10	vs Texas A&M	Omaha Municipal Stadium • Omaha, Nebraska	14–5	25–4
30	June 13	vs Missouri	Omaha Municipal Stadium • Omaha, Nebraska	1–3	25–5
