= Bill Davis (baseball) =

American baseball player (1942–2023)

- First baseman
- Born: June 6, 1942; Graceville, Minnesota, U.S.
- Died: January 13, 2023 (aged 80)
- Batted: Left Threw: Left

MLB debut
- September 16, 1965, for the Cleveland Indians

Last MLB appearance
- May 21, 1969, for the San Diego Padres

MLB statistics
- Batting average: .181
- Home runs: 1
- Runs batted in: 5
- Stats at Baseball Reference

Teams
- Cleveland Indians (1965–1966); San Diego Padres (1969)

Arthur Willard Davis (June 6, 1942 – January 13, 2023) was an American Major League Baseball first baseman who played for the Cleveland Indians from 1965 to 1966 and the San Diego Padres in 1969.

Due to his imposing 6 ft 7 in (2.01 m), 215 lb (98 kg) frame, Davis was nicknamed the "Jolly Green Giant". He batted and threw left-handed, and signed with Cleveland after starring in baseball and basketball at the University of Minnesota. He began his baseball career in the Double-A Eastern League in 1964, and in his sophomore season he hit 33 home runs, batted .311 and drove in 106 runs for the Triple-A Portland Beavers in 1965. Recalled by Cleveland in September, he made ten appearances as a pinch hitter and counted a double among his three hits. He began and ended 1966 with the Indians, but spent most of the year in Portland. In 38 MLB at bats, Davis made only six hits, but one was his first (and only) Major League home run, against veteran Jack Sanford of the California Angels as a pinch hitter on September 9.

Davis then spent the entire 1967 season on the disabled list after he ruptured his Achilles tendon while playing a pick-up basketball game in January. He would never play another game for the Indians, but after his third stint with Triple-A Portland in 1968, he was traded to the newly established Padres. He was the starting first baseman in the first official National League game ever played by the Padres on April 8, 1969, and went hitless in three at bats against the Houston Astros. He started ten more games in April, but did not hit enough to hold the regular job, and was traded to the St. Louis Cardinals in May. The Cardinals immediately sent him to Triple-A, where he spent the rest of the 1969 season, his last in baseball. In addition to his home run, Davis' 19 total MLB hits also included three doubles in 64 career games played and 105 at bats.

Davis then returned to his hometown of Richfield, Minnesota, where he worked in real estate and banking.

Davis died January 13, 2023.
