= Frank Brosseau =

American baseball player (born 1944)

- Pitcher
- Born: July 31, 1944 (age 81); Drayton, North Dakota
- Batted: Right Threw: Right

MLB debut
- September 10, 1969, for the Pittsburgh Pirates

Last MLB appearance
- June 13, 1971, for the Pittsburgh Pirates

MLB statistics
- Win–loss record: 0–0
- Earned run average: 4.91
- Strikeouts: 2
- Stats at Baseball Reference

Teams
- Pittsburgh Pirates (1969, 1971)

Franklin Lee Brosseau (born July 31, 1944) is an American former professional baseball player. He played three games in Major League Baseball as a right-handed relief pitcher for the 1969 and 1971 Pittsburgh Pirates. A graduate of the University of Minnesota, where he received a B.A. degree in mathematics, Brosseau stood 6 feet 1 inch (1.85 m) tall and weighed 180 pounds (82 kg).

Brosseau began his six-season (1966–71) professional career as an outfielder in the Pirates' farm system. But after batting only .176 and .211 in successive campaigns in Class A, he converted to pitcher in 1968, and posted strong earned run averages in both 1968 (1.88, with the Gastonia Pirates of the Class A Western Carolinas League) and 1969 (1.90, with the York Pirates of the Double-A Eastern League). Brosseau was then recalled by Pittsburgh in September 1969 for his first taste of MLB service.

In his debut game, on September 10 at Forbes Field, he replaced starting pitcher Steve Blass in the fourth inning against the St. Louis Cardinals, with the Bucs already trailing 4–0. Brosseau gave up a run-scoring single to Curt Flood, but got the final out to limit the damage. However, in the fifth inning, he left the bases loaded with only one out before being relieved by Bruce Dal Canton, who then allowed two of Brosseau's runners to score. Those two earned runs would account for the only runs charged to Brosseau in his brief MLB career. Brosseau retired the New York Mets in order in his second appearance on September 21, 1969; then, recalled from the Triple-A Charleston Charlies in June 1971, Brosseau again faced the Cardinals and, this time, retired all five batters he faced.

All told, in 3 2/3 Major League innings pitched, he gave up three hits, two earned runs, and two bases on balls, with two strikeouts.
