= Joe Ferris =

American baseball player

- Pitcher
- Born: 1944 or 1945 (age 81–82); Brewer, Maine, U.S.
- Throws: Right

Joe Ferris was an American college baseball pitcher who won the 1964 College World Series Most Outstanding Player award while a sophomore at University of Maine. He is the only player from University of Maine to win that award.

In 1964, he played collegiate summer baseball with the Bourne Canalmen of the Cape Cod Baseball League. He was inducted into the University of Maine Hall of Fame in 1988.
