= Ron Wojciak =

American baseball player (1943–1966)

- Catcher
- Born: March 22, 1943; Hennepin County, Minnesota, U.S.
- Died: September 29, 1966 (aged 23)
- Batted: Right Threw: Right

FIL debut
- 1964, for the Twins

Last FSL appearance
- 1965, for the Orlando Twins
- Stats at Baseball Reference

Career highlights and awards
- Had signed to play professional baseball with the Minnesota Twins but never played

Ron Wojciak (March 22, 1943 – September 29, 1966) was an American baseball player.

Wojciak grew up in Columbia Heights, Minnesota. He attended the University of Minnesota, where he earned All-Big 10 and All-American honors in baseball. His team, the Minnesota Golden Gophers, won the 1964 College World Series. He served as the team's catcher. He signed to play professional baseball with the Minnesota Twins. He played for the Orlando Twins, a Twins minor league affiliate in the Florida State League, in 1965, appearing in 59 games with a .250 batting average.

Wojciak died in 1966 of lung cancer. In his honor, his hometown boosters founded the Ron Wojciak Award, to be given to those involved in community youth athletics. The award has been presented annually since 1966. He was elected to the Gopher Sports Hall of Fame in 2004.
