= 1965 NCAA University Division baseball rankings =

1965 NCAA University Division baseball season

Tournament

College World Series
- Champions: Arizona State
- Runners-up: Ohio State
- MOP: Sal Bando (Arizona State)

Seasons
- ← 1964 1966 →

The following poll makes up the 1965 NCAA University Division baseball rankings. Collegiate Baseball Newspaper published its first human poll of the top 20 teams in college baseball in 1957, and expanded to rank the top 30 teams in 1961.

== Collegiate Baseball ==
Currently, only the final poll from the 1965 season is available.

| Rank | Team |
|---|---|
| 1 | Arizona State |
| 2 | Ohio State |
| 3 | Saint Louis |
| 4 | Washington State |
| 5 | Florida State |
| 6 | Connecticut |
| 7 | Lafayette |
| 8 | Texas |
| 9 | Detroit |
| 10 | Georgia Tech |
| 11 | Ohio |
| 12 | Stanford |
| 13 | Holy Cross |
| 14 | California |
| 15 | Michigan |
| 16 | Cal Poly Pomona |
| 17 | Santa Clara |
| 18 | Missouri |
| 19 | Texas A&M |
| 20 | Western Michigan |
| 21 | Michigan State |
| 22 | Utah |
| 23 | UCLA |
| 24 | USC |
| 25 | Arizona |
| 26 | Cal State Northridge |
| 27 | Princeton |
| 28 | Rider |
| 29 | Mississippi State |
| 30 | Maryland |
