= Washington State Cougars baseball statistical leaders =

The Washington State Cougars baseball statistical leaders are individual statistical leaders of the Washington State Cougars baseball program in various categories, including batting average, home runs, runs batted in, runs, hits, stolen bases, ERA, and Strikeouts. Within those areas, the lists identify single-game, single-season, and career leaders. The Cougars represent the Washington State University in the NCAA's Mountain West Conference.

Washington State began competing in intercollegiate baseball in 1892. These lists are updated through the end of the 2025 season.

== Batting Average ==
Career
Rk	Player	AVG	Seasons
1	Greg Monda	.369	1981 1982 1983
2	Dale Ford	.365	1964 1965 1966
3	Nick Tanielu	.364	2013 2014
4	Glen Walker	.362	1979 1980
5	Mike Kinkade	.361	1992 1993 1994 1995
6	Scott Hatteberg	.360	1989 1990 1991
7	Jim Connor	.358	1987 1988 1989 1990
8	Tom Thomas	.3551	1970 1971
9	Ray Hattenburg	.3546	1997 1998 1999 2000
10	Dave Edler	.349	1975 1976 1977 1978

Season
Rk	Player	AVG	Season
1	Busher Lewis	.500	1917
2	John G. Olerud	.464	1988
3	Lyman Passmore	.462	1917
4	Clifford Marker	.446	1925
5	Edwin Goddard	.430	1937
6	Curry Mitchell	.426	1925
7	Kelly Smith	.418	1980
8	William Sewell	.412	1941
9	John Zaepfel	.404	1924
10	Jared Prince	.401	2006

== Home Runs ==
Career
Rk	Player	HR	Seasons
1	Derek Jones	41	2009 2010 2011 2012
2	Jeff Hooper	40	1984 1985 1986 1987
3	Casey Kelley	38	1996 1997 1998
4	Jim Connor	37	1987 1988 1989 1990
5	Beau Campbell	34	1989 1990 1991 1992
	Jim Murphy	34	2005 2006 2007 2008
7	John G. Olerud	33	1987 1988 1989
	Jason Grove	33	1998 1999 2000
9	Stefan Bailie	30	2000 2001
10	Phil Westendorf	28	1974 1975 1976 1977
	Grant Richardson	28	2002 2003 2004

Season
Rk	Player	HR	Season
1	Casey Kelley	25	1998
2	John G. Olerud	23	1988
3	Glen Walker	21	1980
	Jeff Hooper	21	1987
5	Beau Campbell	20	1992
6	Rob Smith	19	1987
7	Mike Meyers	18	1987
	Jason Grove	18	1999
	Stefan Bailie	18	2001
10	Dale Ford	17	1966

Single Game
Rk	Player	HR	Season	Opponent
1	Doug Simon	3	1973	Oregon
	Mike Miller	3	1983	Lewis-Clark State
	Jim Connor	3	1987	Gonzaga
	Casey Kelley	3	1998	Gonzaga
	Jason Grove	3	1999	New Mexico St.

== Runs Batted In ==
Career
Rk	Player	RBI	Seasons
1	Kevin Brunstad	199	1991 1992 1993 1994
2	Mike Kinkade	197	1992 1993 1994 1995
3	Jim Connor	189	1987 1988 1989 1990
4	Jeff Hooper	172	1984 1985 1986 1987
5	Derek Jones	164	2009 2010 2011 2012
6	Phil Westendorf	162	1974 1975 1976 1977
7	Jared Prince	161	2006 2007 2008 2009
8	Jim Murphy	159	2005 2006 2007 2008
9	Marv Chamberlain	156	1971 1972 1973 1974
10	Greg Hunter	153	1987 1988 1989 1990

Season
Rk	Player	RBI	Season
1	Jeff Hooper	81	1987
	John G. Olerud	81	1988
3	Glen Walker	76	1980
4	Marv Chamberlain	73	1974
5	Beau Campbell	72	1992
6	Steve Webb	71	1988
7	Casey Kelley	68	1998
	Grant Richardson	68	2004
9	Kevin Brunstad	67	1993
10	Greg Monda	65	1983
	Rod Smith	65	1987

Single Game
Rk	Player	RBI	Season	Opponent
1	Doug Simon	9	1973	Oregon
2	Jonah Advincula	8	2023	UC Riverside
3	Randy Kaleikilo	7	1996	TCU
	Casey Kelley	7	1998	Gonzaga
	Steve Mortimer	7	2002	Oregon State
	Collin Henderson	7	2004	Texas-Pan American
	Derek Jones	7	2010	USC
	Justin Van De Brake	7	2020	Niagara
	Will Cresswell	7	2025	New Mexico

== Runs ==
Career
Rk	Player	R	Seasons
1	Mike Kinkade	230	1992 1993 1994 1995
2	Jim Connor	217	1987 1988 1989 1990
3	Shawn Stevenson	200	1997 1998 1999 2000
4	Greg Hunter	189	1987 1988 1989 1990
5	Rob Smith	178	1984 1985 1986 1987
6	Jay Miller	171	2003 2004 2005 2006
7	Mike Miller	170	1980 1981 1982 1983
8	Mike Wetmore	167	1994 1995 1996
9	Derek Jones	164	2009 2010 2011 2012
10	Tad Thompson	158	1989 1990 1991 1992

Season
Rk	Player	R	Season
1	Rob Smith	87	1987
2	John G. Olerud	83	1988
3	Mike Kinkade	72	1994
4	Mike Miller	71	1983
5	Jim Connor	70	1988
	Jim Connor	70	1990
7	Kelly Smith	69	1980
	Mike Meyers	69	1987
9	Mike Wetmore	66	1994
10	Mike Kinkade	64	1993
	Kaeo Rubin	64	2004

Single Game
Rk	Player	R	Season	Opponent
1	Four others	5	All prior to 1950	
	George Camp	5	1951	
	Bill Rich	5	1956	
	Jim Chapados	5	1973	
	Doug Simon	5	1975	
	Loren Hoppes	5	1984	
	Tad Thompson	5	1990	
	Tad Thompson	5	1990	
	Shawn Stevenson	5		
	Shawn Stevenson	5		
	Ray Hattenburg	5	1999	
	Ray Hattenburg	5	1999	Washington
	Shawn Stevenson	5	1999	New Mexico St.
	Shawn Stevenson	5	1999	USC
	Jay Miller	5	2006	Gonzaga
	Taylor Ard	5	2011	USC
	Kyle Manzardo	5	2020	Niagara
	Ryan Skjonsby	5	2025	New Mexico

== Hits ==
Career
Rk	Player	H	Seasons
1	Jay Miller	307	2003 2004 2005 2006
2	Mike Kinkade	304	1992 1993 1994 1995
3	Shawn Stevenson	273	1997 1998 1999 2000
4	Jim Connor	271	1987 1988 1989 1990
5	Greg Hunter	263	1987 1988 1989 1990
6	Jared Prince	256	2006 2007 2008 2009
7	Ray Hattenburg	255	1997 1998 1999 2000
8	Kevin Brunstad	245	1991 1992 1993 1994
9	Bookie Gates	232	1999 2000 2001 2002
10	Derek Jones	227	2009 2010 2011 2012

Season
Rk	Player	H	Season
1	John G. Olerud	108	1988
2	Jeff Hooper	92	1987
3	Jim Connor	91	1988
4	Mike Kinkade	90	1994
5	Scott Hatteberg	88	1990
	Ray Hattenburg	88	1999
	Jay Miller	88	2006
8	Rob Smith	87	1987
	Jim Connor	87	1990
10	Jared Prince	83	2006

Single Game
Rk	Player	H	Season	Opponent
1	Charles Weller	6	1907	Ft. Walla Walla
	Glen Walker	6	1979	Arizona
	Mike Kinkade	6	1992	Washington
	Jeff Scherer	6	1999	New Mexico St.
	Kaeo Rubin	6	2005	Northern Colorado
6	24 times	5	Most recent: Ollie Obenour, 2025 vs. Air Force	

== Stolen Bases ==
Career
Rk	Player	SB	Seasons
1	Mike Miller	97	1980 1981 1982 1983
2	Bob Waits	94	1969 1970 1971
3	Roger Dirkes	75	1973 1974 1975
4	Steve Merkley	67	1971 1972 1973
	Mike Wetmore	67	1994 1995 1996
6	Bob Fry	48	1963 1964 1965
	Steve Grasser	48	1971 1972 1973
	Tom Jobb	48	1974 1975 1976 1977
	Joey Zellner	48	1984 1985
10	John Rankin	47	1969 1970

Season
Rk	Player	SB	Season
1	Bob Waits	59	1971
2	Mike Miller	43	1983
3	Mike Miller	38	1982
4	John Rankin	35	1970
5	Roger Dirkes	33	1974
6	Steve Merkley	32	1972
	Mike Wetmore	32	1996
8	Roger Dirkes	31	1975
	Joey Zellner	31	1985
10	Kelly Smith	30	1980

Single Game
Rk	Player	SB	Season	Opponent
1	Bob Waits	6	1971	Lewis-Clark State
2	Ken Cameron	3	1995	Washington
	Darren Nordlund	3	1996	Arizona
	Ryan Ryan	3	1996	Grand Canyon
	Steve Gleason	3	1997	Pacific
	Bookie Gates	3	2002	Oregon State
	Jason Freeman	3	2005	Utah Valley State
	Travis Coulter	3	2006	Gonzaga
	Ian Sagdal	3	2015	Portland
	Luke Thiele	3	2025	Iowa

== Earned Run Average ==
Career
Rk	Player	ERA	Seasons
1	Rick Austin	1.19	1967 1968
2	Dan Frisella	1.49	1965 1966
3	Tom Brown	1.55	1966 1967
4	Joe Karp	1.56	1966 1967 1968
5	Mike Avey	1.86	1964 1965 1966
6	Landy James	2.13	1951 1952 1953
7	Norm Angelini	2.29	1968 1969
8	Bob Bolingbroke	2.42	1958 1959 1960
9	Murray Gage-Cole	2.44	1970 1971
10	Larry Herman	2.46	1972 1973

Season
Rk	Player	ERA	Season
1	Tom Brown	0.47	1967
2	Bob Salisbury	0.85	1965
3	Rick Austin	1.10	1968
4	Mike Avey	1.22	1965
5	Rick Austin	1.33	1967
6	Landy James	1.38	1951
7	Roger Stein	1.43	1973
8	Joe Karp	1.44	1968
9	Doug Bohlke	1.48	1953
10	Dan Frisella	1.49	1965

== Strikeouts ==
Career
Rk	Player	K	Seasons
1	Aaron Sele	278	1989 1990 1991
2	Robert Ramsay	273	1993 1994 1995 1996
3	Grant Taylor	252	2020 2021 2022 2023 2024
4	Joe McIntosh	251	1971 1972 1973
5	Todd Meldahl	244	1997 1998 1999 2000
6	Matt Way	239	2006 2007 2008 2009
7	Elwood Hahn	226	1958 1959 1960
8	Guy Normand	221	1983 1984 1985 1986
9	Chad Arnold	217	2008 2009 2010 2011
10	Dick Montee	216	1958 1959 1960

Season
Rk	Player	K	Season
1	Matt Way	124	2009
2	Aaron Sele	121	1990
3	Aaron Sele	114	1991
4	John G. Olerud	113	1988
5	Dan Frisella	108	1966
6	Joe McIntosh	102	1973
7	Grant Taylor	99	2024
8	Aaron Mackenzie	95	2004
9	Robert Ramsay	94	1996
10	Dakota Hawkins	92	2023

Single Game
Rk	Player	K	Season	Opponent
1	Norm Angelini	18	1969	Idaho
2	Grant Taylor	17	2024	Washington
3	John G. Olerud	16	1988	Eastern Washington
4	James Freeman	13	2005	Southeastern La.
	Matt Way	13	2009	Washington
	Zane Mills	13	2021	Dixie State
7	Todd Belitz	12	1997	Portland State
	Todd Belitz	12	1997	Oregon State
	Wade Parrish	12	1999	USC
	Dakota Hawkins	12	2023	Washington
