= 1965 Ohio State Buckeyes baseball team =

Ohio baseball team

1965 Ohio State Buckeyes baseball

Big Ten Champions District 4 champions

College World Series, Runner-Up
- Conference: Big Ten Conference
- CB: No. 2
- Record: 30–13 (11–2 Big Ten)
- Head coach: Marty Karow (15th season)

1965 Big Ten Conference baseball standings
	Conf.				Overall
Team	W		L	PCT	W		L	PCT
No. 2 Ohio State ‍†‍‍^{y}	11	–	2	.846	30	–	13	.698
No. 15 Michigan ‍‍‍	10	–	5	.667	10	–	5	.667
No. 21 Michigan State ‍‍‍	9	–	6	.600	28	–	11	.718
Iowa ‍‍‍	7	–	5	.583	13	–	12	.520
Illinois ‍‍‍	8	–	6	.571	8	–	6	.571
Indiana ‍‍‍	6	–	7	.462	20	–	15	.571
Minnesota ‍‍‍	5	–	7	.417	5	–	7	.417
Purdue ‍‍‍	5	–	7	.417	14	–	11	.560
Wisconsin ‍‍‍	6	–	9	.400	6	–	9	.400
Northwestern ‍‍‍	1	–	14	.067	1	–	14	.067
† – Conference champion y – Invited to the NCAA tournament As of June 30, 1965; Rankings from Collegiate Baseball

The 1965 Ohio State Buckeyes baseball team represented the Ohio State University in the 1965 NCAA University Division baseball season. The team was coached by Marty Karow in his 15th season at Ohio State.

The Buckeyes lost the College World Series, defeated by the Arizona State Sun Devils in the championship game.

== Roster ==
1965 Ohio State Buckeyes roster
Pitchers: 22 - Steve Arlin - Sophomore; Ronald Kitchton	Catchers: Chuck Brinkman - Junior; Infielders: 3 - Arnie Chonko - Senior; Ralph Copp - Sophomore; James Graham - Junior; Dennis Jacobs - Sophomore; Bo Rein - Sophomore	Outfielders: Don Harkins - Senior; Russell Nagelson - Junior; Jimmie Reed - Senior; 15 - Ray Shoup - Sophomore; Unknown: John Anderson - Junior; Robert Bourne; John Durant - Senior; Raymond Dusenbury; James Merrell - Senior; Wayne Mogan - Sophomore; David Singerman

== Schedule and results ==
Legend
Ohio State win
Ohio State loss
Ohio State tie

1965 Ohio State Buckeyes baseball game log
Regular season (23–11)
March (5–6)

Date	Opponent	Site/stadium	Score	Overall Record	Big Ten Record
March 20	at Arizona State College	Unknown • Flagstaff, Arizona	5–1	1–0	–
March 20	at Arizona State College	Unknown • Flagstaff, Arizona	12–7	2–0	–
March 22	at Grand Canyon	Brazell Field • Phoenix, Arizona	6–2	3–0	–
March 22	at Arizona State	Phoenix Municipal Stadium • Phoenix, Arizona	3–6	3–1	–
March 23	at Arizona State	Phoenix Municipal Stadium • Phoenix, Arizona	6–7	3–2	–
March 24	at Arizona State	Phoenix Municipal Stadium • Phoenix, Arizona	3–10	3–3	–
March 24	at Grand Canyon	Brazell Field • Phoenix, Arizona	5–1	4–3	–
March 25	at Arizona	UA Field • Tucson, Arizona	1–11	4–4	–
March 26	at Arizona	UA Field • Tucson, Arizona	3–8	4–5	–
March 27	at Arizona	UA Field • Tucson, Arizona	4–1	5–5	–
March 27	at Arizona	UA Field • Tucson, Arizona	0–3	5–6	–

April (10–4)

Date	Opponent	Site/stadium	Score	Overall Record	Big Ten Record
April 2	at Missouri	Simmons Field • Columbia, Missouri	10–6	6–6	–
April 9	Cincinnati	Unknown • Columbus, Ohio	8–5	7–6	–
April 10	Cincinnati	Unknown • Columbus, Ohio	4–1	8–6	–
April 10	Cincinnati	Unknown • Columbus, Ohio	2–3	8–7	–
April 13	Southern Illinois	Unknown • Columbus, Ohio	9–0	9–7	–
April 16	Ball State	Unknown • Columbus, Ohio	6–0	10–7	–
April 17	Ball State	Unknown • Columbus, Ohio	5–6	10–8	–
April 17	Ball State	Unknown • Columbus, Ohio	9–1	11–8	–
April 20	at Western Michigan	Hyames Field • Kalamazoo, Michigan	1–7	11–9	–
April 20	at Western Michigan	Hyames Field • Kalamazoo, Michigan	4–1	12–9	–
April 23	at Indiana	Sembower Field • Bloomington, Indiana	8–2	13–9	1–0
April 24	at Indiana	Sembower Field • Bloomington, Indiana	6–5	14–9	2–0
April 24	at Indiana	Sembower Field • Bloomington, Indiana	0–1	14–10	2–1
April 30	at Northwestern	Rocky Miller Park • Evanston, Illinois	10–2	15–10	3–1

May (8–1)

Date	Opponent	Site/stadium	Score	Overall Record	Big Ten Record
May 1	at Wisconsin	Guy Lowman Field • Madison, Wisconsin	6–2	16–10	4–1
May 1	at Wisconsin	Guy Lowman Field • Madison, Wisconsin	3–4	17–10	5–1
May 7	Purdue	Unknown • Columbus, Ohio	6–5	18–10	6–1
May 8	Illinois	Unknown • Columbus, Ohio	7–5	19–10	7–1
May 8	Illinois	Unknown • Columbus, Ohio	0–2	19–11	7–2
May 14	at Iowa	Unknown • Iowa City, Iowa	3–0	20–11	8–2
May 21	Michigan	Unknown • Columbus, Ohio	4–3	21–11	9–2
May 22	Michigan State	Unknown • Columbus, Ohio	13–10	22–11	10–2
May 22	Michigan State	Unknown • Columbus, Ohio	2–0	23–11	11–2

Postseason (7–2)
District 4 playoff (3–0)

Date	Opponent	Site/stadium	Score	Overall Record	Big Ten Record
May 27	vs Ball State	Trautwein Field • Athens, Ohio	4–0	24–11	11–2
May 28	at Ohio	Trautwein Field • Athens, Ohio	4–2	25–11	11–2
May 29	vs Detroit	Trautwein Field • Athens, Ohio	10–7	26–11	11–2

1965 College World Series (4–2)

Date	Opponent	Site/stadium	Score	Overall Record	Big Ten Record
June 7	vs Florida State	Johnny Rosenblatt Stadium • Omaha, Nebraska	2–1	27–11	11–2
June 8	vs Washington State	Johnny Rosenblatt Stadium • Omaha, Nebraska	14–1	28–11	11–2
June 9	vs Arizona State	Johnny Rosenblatt Stadium • Omaha, Nebraska	4–9	28–12	11–2
June 10	vs Washington State	Johnny Rosenblatt Stadium • Omaha, Nebraska	1–0	29–12	11–2
June 11	vs Arizona State	Johnny Rosenblatt Stadium • Omaha, Nebraska	7–3	30–12	11–2
June 12	vs Arizona State	Johnny Rosenblatt Stadium • Omaha, Nebraska	1–2	30–13	11–2

Schedule Source:

== Awards and honors ==
Arnold Chonko

- All Tournament Team
- First Team All-Big Ten

Bo Rein

- All Tournament Team

Chuck Brinkman

- All Tournament Team

Steve Arlin

- All Tournament Team
- First Team All-American

== Buckeyes in the 1965 MLB draft ==
The following members of the Ohio State Buckeyes baseball program were drafted in the 1965 Major League Baseball draft.

Round	Pick	Player	Position	MLB Club
23	402	Steve Arlin	P	Detroit Tigers
23	403	Arnie Chonko	1B	Detroit Tigers
