= Steve Arlin =

American baseball player (1945–2016)

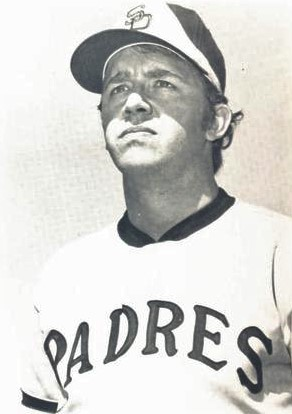
- Pitcher
- Born: September 25, 1945; Seattle, Washington, U.S.
- Died: August 17, 2016 (aged 70); San Diego, California, U.S.
- Batted: Right Threw: Right

MLB debut
- June 17, 1969, for the San Diego Padres

Last MLB appearance
- September 14, 1974, for the Cleveland Indians

MLB statistics
- Win–loss record: 34–67
- Earned run average: 4.33
- Strikeouts: 463
- Stats at Baseball Reference

Teams
- San Diego Padres (1969–1974); Cleveland Indians (1974)

Member of the National College

Baseball Hall of Fame
- Induction: 2008

Steven Ralph Arlin (September 25, 1945 – August 17, 2016) was an American pitcher in Major League Baseball who played for the San Diego Padres and Cleveland Indians for six seasons.

== College star ==
Born in Seattle, Arlin was a collegiate star at Ohio State University and was a star in the College World Series. In a 1965 semifinal game against Washington State, he struck out 20 batters in 15 innings, both CWS records, in a 1–0 complete game victory for the Buckeyes. Ohio State, however, lost the final game to an Arizona State team that featured Rick Monday and Sal Bando. The following year in 1966, Arlin led Ohio State to the title and was named the CWS most valuable player.

In his two years with the Buckeyes, Arlin posted a 24–3 record with 294 strikeouts. His 165 strikeouts in 1965 remains an Ohio State single-season record; it and the career strikeout record had been set by Paul Ebert in the 1950s. Arlin's number 22 was the first to be retired by the Ohio State baseball team.

In 1978, Arlin was inducted into the Ohio State Varsity O Hall of Fame. In 2006, Arlin was a finalist for the first induction class of the College Baseball Hall of Fame. In 2008 he was inducted.

== Minor Leagues ==
In 1966 the Philadelphia Phillies drafted Arlin in the first round (13th overall) in the secondary phase of the amateur draft. On July 25, 1967, he pitched a no-hitter in the Eastern League. Arlin also pitched in the Phillies’ farm system in 1968 before being selected by the San Diego Padres in the expansion draft.

== Major Leagues ==
Pitching for a struggling young team, Arlin led the National League in losses in both 1971 and 1972 (19 and 21 respectively). In those seasons, however, he posted earned run averages of 3.48 in 1971 and 3.60 in 1972. The 1972 season was an especially curious one for Arlin: he pitched a one-hitter, three two-hitters (in one, on July 18 against the Phillies, he had a no-hitter broken up by Denny Doyle with two out in the ninth— the closest a Padre had come to pitching a no-hitter until Joe Musgrove in 2021), and a 10-inning stint in which he allowed only one hit, yet he finished 10–21. In 1973 Arlin recorded a personal best 11 victories against 14 losses, but with a 5.10 ERA—nearly a run and a half above his career ERA to that point.

Arlin was primarily a starting pitcher in the major leagues (141 games, 123 starts) but on June 9, 1974, he did pick up his one and only MLB save.

Midway into the 1974 season, the Padres traded Arlin to the Cleveland Indians for two players to be named later. The Indians completed the trade a week later by sending pitchers Brent Strom and Terry Ley to the Padres. After closing out the season, Arlin, a dental student, retired from baseball and went into the dental profession. During his Major League career, Arlin won 34 games (11 of which were shutouts) while losing 67, with 463 strikeouts and a 4.33 earned run average in 788 2/3 innings pitched.

Arlin's grandfather, Harold Arlin, was the first broadcaster ever to call a game on radio, an August 5, 1921 game between the Phillies and Pittsburgh Pirates at Forbes Field. Harold Arlin also broadcast the first-ever football game to be called over the radio months later, a college football game between Pitt and West Virginia.

== Death ==
Arlin died in San Diego, California on August 17, 2016, at the age of 70.

== See also ==
- Ohio State Buckeyes baseball retired numbers
