= 1965 Florida State Seminoles baseball team =

American college baseball season

1965 Florida State Seminoles baseball

NCAA District 3 champions

College World Series, 1–2
- Conference: Independent
- Record: 32–11–1
- Head coach: Fred Hatfield (2nd year)
- Home stadium: Seminole Field

1965 NCAA University Division District 3 baseball independents standings
	Conf.						Overall
Team	W		L		T	PCT	W		L		T	PCT
No. 6 Florida State ‍‍‍^{y}		–		–		–	32	–	11	–	1	.739
Georgia Tech ‍‍‍		–		–		–	20	–	8	–	0	.714
Elon ‍‍‍		–		–		–	22	–	13	–	0	.629
Mercer ‍‍‍		–		–		–	13	–	8	–	0	.619
Campbell ‍‍‍		–		–		–	7	–	8	–	0	.467
Stetson ‍‍‍		–		–		–	11	–	19	–	0	.367
Georgetown ‍‍‍		–		–		–	8	–	9	–	0	.471
South Alabama ‍‍‍		–		–		–	3	–	12	–	0	.200
Jacksonville ‍‍‍		–		–		–	5	–	23	–	0	.179
y – Invited to the NCAA tournament As of June 30, 1965; Rankings from Collegiate Baseball

The 1965 Florida State Seminoles baseball team represented Florida State University in the 1965 NCAA University Division baseball season. The Seminoles played their home games at Seminole Field. The team was coached by Fred Hatfield in his second season at Florida State.

The Seminoles reached the College World Series, their fourth appearance in Omaha, where they finished tied for fifth place after recording a second round win against Texas, and losses to eventual runner-up Ohio State and Saint Louis.

== Personnel ==
=== Roster ===
1965 Florida State Seminoles roster
Pitchers: 4 - Dick Fernandez - Junior; 6 - Maury Hopkins - Junior; 12 - Marv Stringfellow - Sophomore; 22 - Chuck Hawkins - Junior; 25 - Eddie Howell - Junior; 26 - Jim Ward - Sophomore; 30 - Nick Cafaro - Junior; - Ken Creely - Junior; - Bob Kull - Senior; - Steve Marks - Sophomore; - John McCune; - Joe McKinney - Junior; - Don Murray - Senior; - Cliff Ranew - Senior	Catchers: 17 - Randy Brown - (redshirt) Junior; 18 - Bill Hammond - Junior; Infielders: 8 - Gary Lawrence - Junior; 8 - Gary Nichols - Senior; 9 - Pete Sarron - Junior; 36 - Gerry Chmielewski - Senior; - Bill Bearse - Junior; - Leon Chalhub - Senior; - Dean Duchak - Sophomore; - Wayne Giardino - Sophomore; - Mike Haney - Junior; - Houston Taff - Junior	Outfielders: 15 - Mike Martin - Junior; 20 - Monty McBryde - Senior; 31 - Bob Wilcox - Senior; - Sonny Detmer - Junior; - Rick Hutchinson - Junior; - Roy Mewbourne - Sophomore; - Tom Thomas - Junior; - Bob Wooley - Sophomore

=== Coaches ===
1965 Florida State Seminoles baseball coaching staff
- Fred Hatfield – Head coach – 2nd year

== Schedule and results ==
Legend
Florida State win
Florida State loss

1965 Florida State Seminoles baseball game log
Regular season

March
Date	Opponent	Site/stadium	Score	Overall record
Mar 12	at Miami (FL)	Miami Field • Miami, FL	W 7–4	1–0
Mar 13	at Miami (FL)	Miami Field • Miami, FL	W 9–4	2–0
Mar 13	at Miami (FL)	Miami Field • Miami, FL	T 9–9	2–0–1
Mar 15	at Florida Southern	Lakeland, FL	W 4–3	3–0–1
Mar 18	Kentucky	Seminole Field • Tallahassee, FL	W 2–0	4–0–1
Mar 26	vs Navy	Naval Air Station Jacksonville • Jacksonville, FL	L 0–1	4–1–1
Mar 26	vs Navy	Naval Air Station Jacksonville • Jacksonville, FL	L 0–1	4–2–1
Mar 29	Michigan State	Seminole Field • Tallahassee, FL	W 11–8	5–2–1
Mar 30	Duke	Seminole Field • Tallahassee, FL	W 11–1	6–2–1
Mar 31	Wake Forest	Seminole Field • Tallahassee, FL	W 8–1	7–2–1

April
Date	Opponent	Site/stadium	Score	Overall record
Apr 1	Wake Forest	Seminole Field • Tallahassee, FL	W 5–3	8–2–1
Apr 2	Michigan State	Seminole Field • Tallahassee, FL	L 2–4	8–3–1
Apr 3	Duke	Seminole Field • Tallahassee, FL	W 9–4	9–3–1
Apr 3	Wake Forest	Seminole Field • Tallahassee, FL	W 11–4	10–3–1
Apr 5	Auburn	Seminole Field • Tallahassee, FL	W 6–1	11–3–1
Apr 6	Auburn	Seminole Field • Tallahassee, FL	W 12–0	12–3–1
Apr 9	at Georgia Southern	Statesboro, GA	W 4–2	13–3–1
Apr 10	at Georgia Southern	Statesboro, GA	W 6–3	14–3–1
Apr 22	at Duke	Jack Coombs Field • Durham, NC	W 11–2	15–3–1
Apr 23	at NC State	Riddick Stadium • Raleigh, NC	L 2–7	15–4–1
Apr 24	at North Carolina	Emerson Field • Chapel Hill, NC	L 1–12	15–5–1
Apr 26	at Clemson	Riggs Field • Clemson, SC	L 8–9	15–6–1
Apr 27	at Clemson	Riggs Field • Clemson, SC	W 13–11	16–6–1
Apr 27	at Clemson	Riggs Field • Clemson, SC	W 16–3	17–6–1
Apr 30	at Naval Air Station Pensacola	Pensacola, FL	W 10–1	18–6–1

May
Date	Opponent	Site/stadium	Score	Overall record
May 1	at Naval Air Station Pensacola	Pensacola, FL	W 12–3^{7}	19–6–1
May 7	Loyola (LA)	Seminole Field • Tallahassee, FL	W 7–6	20–6–1
May 8	Loyola (LA)	Seminole Field • Tallahassee, FL	W 18–14	21–6–1
May 10	Georgia Southern	Seminole Field • Tallahassee, FL	W 10–4	22–6–1
May 11	Georgia Southern	Seminole Field • Tallahassee, FL	W 6–2	23–6–1
May 13	Jacksonville	Seminole Field • Tallahassee, FL	W 8–2	24–6–1
May 21	at Florida	Perry Field • Gainesville, FL	L 6–8	24–7–1
May 22	at Florida	Perry Field • Gainesville, FL	W 3–2	25–7–1
May 24	Naval Air Station Pensacola	Seminole Field • Tallahassee, FL	W 10–2	26–7–1

Postseason

NCAA District 3 playoff
Date	Opponent	Site/stadium	Score	Overall record	NCAAT record
May 27	Mississippi State	Sims Legion Park • Gastonia, NC	L 3–6	26–8–1	0–1
May 27	Maryland	Sims Legion Park • Gastonia, NC	W 7–3	27–8–1	1–1
May 28	Mississippi State	Sims Legion Park • Gastonia, NC	W 6–2	28–8–1	2–1
May 29	Furman	Sims Legion Park • Gastonia, NC	W 2–1	29–8–1	3–1
May 29	Furman	Sims Legion Park • Gastonia, NC	W 7–5	30–8–1	4–1

June
Date	Opponent	Site/stadium	Score	Overall record
June 2	Florida	Centennial Field • Tallahassee, FL	W 31–8–1	
June 3	Florida	Centennial Field • Tallahassee, FL	L 10–11	31–9–1

College World Series
Date	Opponent	Site/stadium	Score	Overall record	CWS record
June 7	Ohio State	Johnny Rosenblatt Stadium • Omaha, NE	L 1–2	31–10–1	0–1
June 8	Texas	Johnny Rosenblatt Stadium • Omaha, NE	W 3–2	32–10–1	1–1
June 9	Saint Louis	Johnny Rosenblatt Stadium • Omaha, NE	L 3–5	32–11–1	1–2
