= 1965 NCAA University Division baseball tournament =

American college sports championship

- Season: 1965
- Teams: 23
- Finals site: Johnny Rosenblatt Stadium; Omaha, NE
- Champions: Arizona State (1st title)
- Runner-up: Ohio State (2nd CWS Appearance)
- Winning coach: Bobby Winkles (1st title)
- MOP: Sal Bando (Arizona State)

The 1965 NCAA University Division baseball tournament was played at the end of the 1965 NCAA University Division baseball season to determine the national champion of college baseball. The tournament concluded with eight teams competing in the College World Series, a double-elimination tournament in its nineteenth year. Eight regional districts sent representatives to the College World Series with preliminary rounds within each district serving to determine each representative. These events would later become known as regionals. Each district had its own format for selecting teams, resulting in 23 teams participating in the tournament at the conclusion of their regular season, and in some cases, after a conference tournament. The nineteenth tournament's champion was Arizona State, coached by Bobby Winkles. The Most Outstanding Player was Sal Bando of Arizona State.

== Regionals ==
The opening rounds of the tournament were played across seven district sites across the country, each consisting of a field of two to four teams. Each district tournament, except District 2, was double-elimination. The winners of each district advanced to the College World Series.

Bold indicates winner. * indicates extra innings.

=== District 1 at Boston, MA ===
Finals
**Connecticut**	**7**	0	**7**
Holy Cross	4	**5**	0

=== District 2 at Princeton, NJ ===
Semifinals
Rider	3
**Princeton**	**4**
**Lafayette**	**4**
Pittsburgh	3

Finals
Princeton	4
**Lafayette**	**5**

=== District 3 at Gastonia, NC ===
Upper round 1
**Mississippi State**	**6**
Florida State	3
**Furman**	**4**
Maryland	3
Lower round 1
**Florida State**	**7**
Maryland	3

Upper final
Mississippi State	2
**Furman**	**5**
Lower final
Mississippi State	2
**Florida State**	**6**

Final
Furman	1	5
**Florida State**	**2**	**7**

=== District 4 at Oxford, OH ===
Upper round 1
**Ohio**	**7**
Detroit	6
**Ohio State**	**4**
Ball State	0
Lower round 1
**Detroit**	**4**
Ball State	3

Upper final
Ohio	2
**Ohio State**	**4**
Lower final
Ohio	7
**Detroit**	**8**

Final
**Ohio State**	**10**	—
Detroit	7	—

=== District 5 at St. Louis, MO ===
Finals
Missouri	4	4	—
**Saint Louis**	**5**	**5**	—

=== District 6 ===
Texas automatically qualified for the College World Series out of District 6.

=== District 7 at Phoenix, AZ ===
Semifinal				Final
				**Arizona State**	**7**	**12**	—
**Northern Colorado**	1	**1**	**1**	Northern Colorado	2	3	—
Denver	**8**	0	0

- Northern Colorado was then known as Colorado State College

=== District 8 ===
Semifinals; Stanford, CA				Finals; Pullman, WA
				Stanford	1	3	—
Cal State Northridge	**1**	1	6	**Washington State**	**2**	**13**	—
**Stanford**	0	**12**	**11**

- Cal State Northridge was then known as San Fernando Valley State

== College World Series ==
=== Participants ===
School	Conference	Record (conference)	Head coach	CWS appearances	CWS best finish	CWS record
Arizona State	WAC	49–7 (9–3)	Bobby Winkles	1 (last: 1964)	6th (1964)	1–2
Connecticut	Yankee	15–7 (7–3)	Larry Panciera	2 (last: 1959)	5th (1957)	1–4
Florida State	n/a	31–9–1 (n/a)	Fred Hatfield	3 (last: 1963)	4th (1962)	3–6
Lafayette	Middle Atlantic	16–5 (n/a)	Charlie Gelbert	3 (last: 1958)	3rd (1953)	3–6
Ohio State	Big Ten	26–11 (11–2)	Marty Karow	1 (last: 1951)	8th (1951)	0–2
Saint Louis	MVC	23–7–1 (6–1)	Roy Lee	0 (last: none)	none	0–0
Texas	SWC	18–5 (11–4)	Bibb Falk	8 (last: 1963)	1st (1949, 1950)	19–13
Washington State	Pac-8	31–6 (14–4)	Chuck Brayton	2 (last: 1956)	2nd (1950)	3–4

=== Results ===
==== Bracket ====
Upper round 1
Ohio State	2
Florida State	1
Washington State	12
Texas	5
Arizona State	14
Lafayette	1
Saint Louis	2
Connecticut	1

Upper round 2
Ohio State	14
Washington State	1
Arizona State	13
Saint Louis	3
Lower round 1
Florida State	3
Texas	2
Lafayette	4
Connecticut	6

Upper final
Ohio State	4
Arizona State	9
Lower round 2
Saint Louis	5
Florida State	3
Washington State	3
Connecticut	2

Semifinals
Arizona State	6
Saint Louis	2
Ohio State	1^{15}
Washington State	0

Final
Arizona State	3	2
Ohio State	7	1

==== Game results ====
Date	Game	Winner	Score	Loser	Notes
June 7	Game 1	Ohio State	2–1	Florida State	
June 7	Game 2	Washington State	12–5	Texas	
June 7	Game 3	Arizona State	14–1	Lafayette	
June 7	Game 4	Saint Louis	2–1	Connecticut	
June 8	Game 5	Florida State	3–2	Texas	Texas eliminated
June 8	Game 6	Connecticut	6–4	Lafayette	Lafayette eliminated
June 8	Game 7	Ohio State	14–1	Washington State	
June 8	Game 8	Arizona State	13–3	Saint Louis	
June 9	Game 9	Saint Louis	5–3	Florida State	Florida State eliminated
June 9	Game 10	Washington State	3–2	Connecticut	Connecticut eliminated
June 9	Game 11	Arizona State	9–4	Ohio State	
June 10	Game 12	Arizona State	6–2	Saint Louis	Saint Louis eliminated
June 10	Game 13	Ohio State	1–0 (15 innings)	Washington State	Washington State eliminated
June 11	Game 14	Ohio State	7–3	Arizona State	
June 12	Final	Arizona State	2–1	Ohio State	Arizona State wins CWS

=== All-Tournament Team ===
The following players were members of the All-Tournament Team.

Position	Player	School
P	Steve Arlin	Ohio State
P	Doug Nurnberg	Arizona State
C	Chuck Brinkman	Ohio State
1B	Arnold Chonko	Ohio State
2B	Luis Lagunas	Arizona State
3B	Sal Bando (MOP)	Arizona State
SS	Bo Rein	Ohio State
OF	Jim Dix	Saint Louis
OF	Bob Fry	Washington State
OF	Rick Monday	Arizona State

=== Notable players ===
- Arizona State: John Pavlik, Sal Bando, Duffy Dyer, Rick Monday, Al Schmelz
- Connecticut: Paul Wislocki
- Florida State: Randy Brown, Jim Lyttle
- Lafayette:
- Ohio State: Steve Arlin, Chuck Brinkman, Russ Nagelson
- St. Louis:
- Texas: Joe Hague, Gary Moore
- Washington State: Danny Frisella

== Tournament notes ==
- Ohio State's 15 inning victory over Washington State is the longest game in College World Series history

== See also ==
- 1965 NAIA World Series
