= Duffy Dyer =

American baseball player (born 1945)

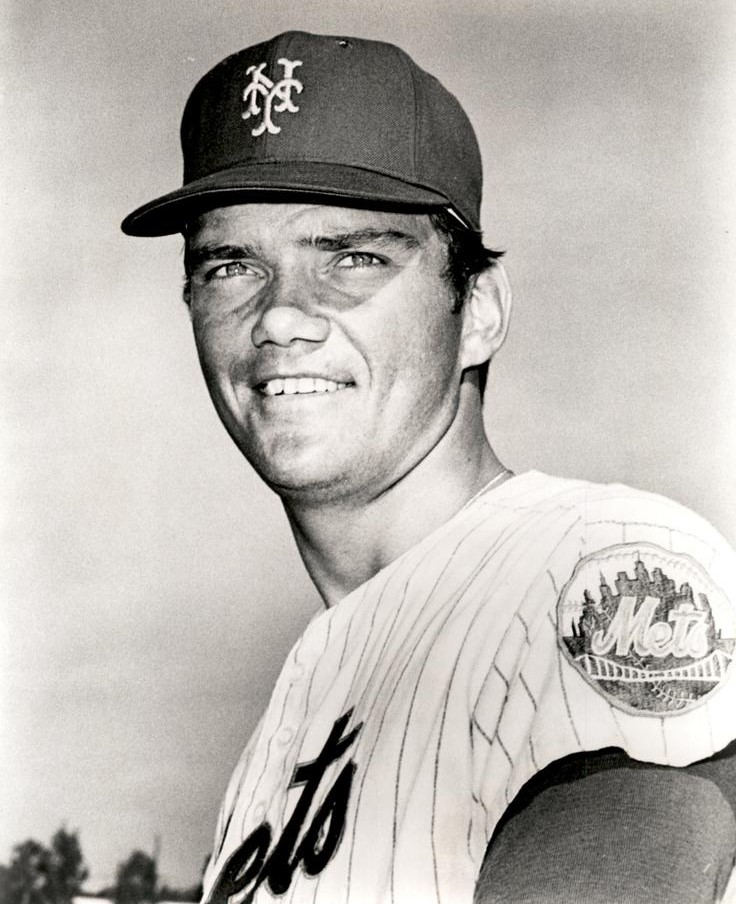
- Catcher
- Born: August 15, 1945 (age 80); Dayton, Ohio, U.S.
- Batted: Right Threw: Right

MLB debut
- September 21, 1968, for the New York Mets

Last MLB appearance
- April 15, 1981, for the Detroit Tigers

MLB statistics
- Batting average: .221
- Home runs: 30
- Runs batted in: 173
- Stats at Baseball Reference

Teams
- New York Mets (1968–1974); Pittsburgh Pirates (1975–1978); Montreal Expos (1979); Detroit Tigers (1980–1981)

Career highlights and awards
- World Series champion (1969)

Donald Robert "Duffy" Dyer (born August 15, 1945) is an American former professional baseball player and manager. He played in Major League Baseball as a catcher from 1968 to 1981, most prominently as a member of the New York Mets team that won two National League pennants and won the World Series in 1969. He also played for the Pittsburgh Pirates, Montreal Expos, and the Detroit Tigers. After his playing career, Dyer coached with several major league organizations and served as a minor league manager.

== Early years ==
Dyer was born in Dayton, Ohio. He was a three-sport athlete at Cortez High School in Phoenix, Arizona, and played collegiately at Arizona State University. Dyer played alongside Sal Bando and Rick Monday as a member of the Arizona State Sun Devils baseball team that won the 1965 College World Series.

He was originally drafted by the Milwaukee Braves in the 38th round of the 1965 Major League Baseball draft, but chose instead to stay in school. The following year, he was drafted by the Mets in the first round of the secondary phase of the draft.

== New York Mets ==
Dyer batted .211 with seventeen home runs and 74 runs batted in over three seasons in the Mets' farm system when he received a September call up in 1968. He singled off the Philadelphia Phillies' Chris Short in his major league debut.

His first major league home run was a pinch hit three run shot in the 1969 season opener. He was one of three catchers manager Gil Hodges carried on the 1969 Miracle Mets team that went on to win the World Series. Dyer grounded out to Mark Belanger in game one of the 1969 World Series in his only post season at bat.

Dyer caught most of the Mets games in 1972, as starter Jerry Grote battled injuries. He earned National League Player of the Week honors the week of June 12-18, when he went 8-for-22 with two home runs and eight RBIs. In 94 games, he posted career-highs with eight home runs and 36 RBIs. He also led NL catchers in double plays and in baserunners caught stealing, finished second in assists and, third in fielding percentage.

He followed his career year with a subpar 1973, as he batted just .185 with one home run and nine RBIs. The highlight of his season came during a September 20 match-up at Shea Stadium against the Pittsburgh Pirates. With first place in the National League East on the line, Dyer doubled in Ken Boswell with two outs in the ninth inning to send the game into extra innings. The Mets would go on to defeat the Pirates in thirteen innings, in what would become known as the "Ball On the Wall" game in Mets folklore.

== Pittsburgh Pirates ==
Following the 1974 season, Dyer was traded to the reigning NL East Champion Pirates for Gene Clines to serve as All-star Manny Sanguillén's back up. On August 3, Dyer hit a thirteenth inning home run to defeat his former team. The Pirates repeated as division champions; Dyer drew a bases loaded walk off Rawly Eastwick in his only plate appearance in the 1975 National League Championship Series against the Cincinnati Reds.

Dyer was the Pirates catcher on August 9, 1976, when John Candelaria pitched a no hitter against the Los Angeles Dodgers. Following the season, the Pirates traded Sanguillén to the Oakland Athletics for manager Chuck Tanner. Used in a platoon system with Ed Ott by Tanner, Dyer led National League catchers in 1977 with a .996 fielding percentage, committing only two errors in 93 games. With Ott's emergence as a reliable bat atop the Pirates line up, Dyer's playing time fell substantially in 1978. Following the season, Dyer signed as a free agent with the Montreal Expos.

== Expos & Tigers ==
Dyer saw limited duty in 1979 behind future Hall of Famer Gary Carter. Following his only season in Montreal, Dyer was traded to the Detroit Tigers for infielder Jerry Manuel. He saw limited playing time behind slugger Lance Parrish behind the plate. Despite batting just .185 in 126 plate appearances in 1980, Dyer hit four home runs, his second most total in any season. He was released early in the 1981 season, appearing in just two games as a defensive replacement without logging an at bat.

== Career statistics ==
Games	PA	AB	Runs	Hits	2B	3B	HR	RBI	SB	BB	SO	HBP	Avg.	OBP	Slg.	Fld%	CS%
722	2266	1993	151	441	74	11	30	173	10	228	415	19	.221	.306	.315	.992	36%

On July 11, 1972, Dyer made his only major league appearance at a position other than catcher. Facing the San Francisco Giants at Shea Stadium, manager Yogi Berra moved Dyer to right field in the third inning following an injury to outfielder John Milner. The only ball hit to Dyer came in the seventh inning, when he misplayed a fly ball by Chris Speier for a two base error that led to two unearned runs.

== Managing and coaching career ==
Shortly after his playing career ended, Dyer accepted his first coaching job with the Chicago Cubs. With Dyer as their bullpen coach, the Cubs bullpen went 20-30 with a 3.37 earned run average.

A year later, Dyer became the inaugural manager of the Minnesota Twins Class-A Midwest League affiliate Kenosha Twins. He led Kenosha to a 79-60 record and Midwest League Championship in 1985 to earn "Manager of the Year" honors. Dyer would win back to back minor league championships, only in 1986, it would be in the Texas League with the Milwaukee Brewers affiliate El Paso Diablos.

After three seasons as a manager in the Brewers' farm system, the Brewers gave Dyer his first major league coaching job. He served as third base coach from 1989 to 1995. He was with the Oakland A’s from 1996 to 1998.

Dyer returned to managing in 1999 with the Bluefield Orioles of the Appalachian League. After two seasons, he was with the Bridgeport Bluefish of the Atlantic League for the 2001 and 2002 seasons. The Bluefish reached the playoffs in both seasons, winning the North Division Series in 2002.

Dyer was a scout for the Mets in 2003 and 2004, and was manager of the Erie SeaWolves in 2005 and 2006. He was hired by the San Diego Padres in 2007 as a catching coordinator.

On November 18, 2013, Dyer returned to Kenosha to once again serve as the inaugural manager of a minor league franchise. This time, it was the Kenosha Kingfish of the Northwoods League collegiate summer baseball league. He managed the Kingfish for six years, compiling a record of 226 wins and 205 losses, and a league championship in 2015.

== Personal life ==
Dyer's nickname came from the popular radio show Duffy's Tavern. His mother had been listening to the show when she went into labor, and asked "How's Duffy?" after giving birth. He and his wife, Lynn, have four children: Cami, Brian, Kevin & Megan.

In 1986, Dyer was inducted into the Arizona State University Sports Hall of Fame. In the 1998 motion picture "Into My Heart", Ben (Rob Morrow) refers to Duffy Dyer as "a cultural icon".
