= 1965 Arizona State Sun Devils baseball team =

University team

1965 Arizona State Sun Devils baseball

National champions WAC champions
- Conference: Western Athletic Conference
- CB: No. 1
- Record: 54–8 (9–3 WAC)
- Head coach: Bobby Winkles (7th year)
- Assistant coach: Ramiro Lujan

1965 Western Athletic Conference baseball standings
	Conf.				Overall
Team	W		L	PCT	W		L	PCT
Northern
No. 22 Utah ‍‍‍	7	–	5	.583	21	–	16	.568
Wyoming ‍‍‍	7	–	5	.583	16	–	22	.421
BYU ‍‍‍	4	–	8	.333	21	–	15	.583
Southern
No. 1 Arizona State ‍†‍‍^{y}	9	–	3	.750	54	–	8	.871
No. 25 Arizona ‍‍‍	7	–	5	.583	37	–	13	.740
New Mexico ‍‍‍	2	–	10	.167	18	–	19	.486
† – Conference champion y – Invited to the NCAA tournament As of June 30, 1965; Rankings from Collegiate Baseball

The 1965 Arizona State Sun Devils baseball team represented Arizona State University in the 1965 NCAA University Division baseball season. The team was coached by Bobby Winkles in his 7th season at Arizona State.

The Sun Devils won the College World Series, defeating the Ohio State Buckeyes in the championship game.

== Roster ==
1965 Arizona State Sun Devils roster
Pitchers: 2 Jim Merrick; 3 Ron Lea; 10 Darrell Hoover; 11 Ted Robison; 19 Dave Cartun; 21 Doug Nurnberg; 22 Al Schmelz; 26 John Pavlik	Infielders: 3 Jan Kleinman; 4 Jim Armstrong; 5 Luis Lagunas; 6 Erin Peterson; 9 Jack Smitheran; 18 Sal Bando; 17 Gar Garland	Outfielders: 14 Larry Martin; 15 Rich Oliver; 20 Jim Gretta; 23 Don Switzenberg; 25 Glenn Smith; 27 Rick Monday; Catchers: 7 Anthony Alesci; 12 Duffy Dyer; 24 Ray Stadler

== Schedule ==
1965 Arizona State Sun Devils baseball game log
Regular season
February/March

Date	Opponent	Score	Overall record	WAC record
February 26	San Fernando State	7–5	1–0	–
February 27	San Fernando State	11–7	2–0	–
February 27	San Fernando State	10–5	3–0	–
March 5	Michigan	3–6	3–1	–
March 6	Michigan	5–2	4–1	–
March 6	Michigan	11–3	5–1	–
March 12	Long Beach State	7–1	6–1	–
March 13	Long Beach State	0–2	6–2	–
March 13	Long Beach State	9–4	7–2	–
March 16	at Grand Canyon	15–2	8–2	–
March 19	Colorado State	8–0	9–2	–
March 20	Colorado State	9–0	10–2	–
March 20	Colorado State	8–0	11–2	–
March 22	Ohio State	6–3	12–2	–
March 23	Ohio State	7–6	13–2	–
March 24	Ohio State	10–3	14–2	–
March 25	Oregon State	10–3	15–2	–
March 26	Oregon State	9–3	16–2	–
March 27	Oregon State	9–4	17–2	–
March 27	Oregon State	2–0	18–2	–
March 29	Colorado	8–2	19–2	–
March 30	Colorado	16–3	20–2	–

April

Date	Opponent	Score	Overall record	WAC record
April 1	Oklahoma	10–2	21–2	–
April 2	Oklahoma	0–2	21–3	–
April 5	Utah State	7–1	22–3	–
April 6	Utah State	6–4	23–3	–
April 7	Utah State	9–4	24–3	–
April 9	New Mexico	9–2	25–3	1–0
April 10	New Mexico	20–3	26–3	2–0
April 15	Wyoming	6–0	27–3	–
April 16	Wyoming	8–0	28–3	–
April 17	Wyoming	10–3	29–3	–
April 17	Wyoming	7–0	30–3	–
April 19	Sul Ross State	14–2	31–3	–
April 19	New Mexico	4–1	32–3	3–0
April 20	Sul Ross State	8–2	33–3	–
April 23	at Arizona	3–12	33–4	3–1
April 24	at Arizona	1–4	33–5	3–2
April 24	at Arizona	10–4	34–5	4–2
April 27	at Grand Canyon	6–1	35–5	–
April 30	at New Mexico	9–5	36–5	5–2

May

Date	Opponent	Score	Overall record	WAC record
May 1	at New Mexico	11–12	36–6	5–3
May 1	at New Mexico	3–2	37–6	6–3
May 4	Grand Canyon	3–7	37–7	–
May 7	San Diego	7–6	38–7	–
May 8	San Diego	12–3	39–7	–
May 8	San Diego	18–3	40–7	–
May 14	Arizona	6–0	41–7	7–3
May 15	Arizona	13–5	42–7	8–3
May 15	Arizona	6–2	43–7	9–3

Postseason
WAC Championship

Date	Opponent	Score	Overall record
May 28	vs. Utah	3–2	44–7
May 29	vs. Utah	3–2	45–7
May 29	vs. Utah	2–1	46–7

NCAA tournament: District 7 playoffs

Date	Opponent	Score	Overall record
June 3	vs. Colorado State	7–2	47–7
June 4	vs. Colorado State	12–3	48–7
June 4	vs. Colorado State	3–2	49–7

NCAA tournament: College World Series

Date	Opponent	Site/stadium	Score	Overall record
June 7	vs. Lafayette	Rosenblatt Stadium	14–1	50–7
June 8	vs. Saint Louis	Rosenblatt Stadium	13–3	51–7
June 9	vs. Ohio State	Rosenblatt Stadium	9–4	52–7
June 10	vs. Saint Louis	Rosenblatt Stadium	6–2	53–7
June 11	vs. Ohio State	Rosenblatt Stadium	3–7	53–8
June 12	vs. Ohio State	Rosenblatt Stadium	2–1	54–8

== Awards and honors ==
Sal Bando

- College World Series Most Outstanding Player
- First Team All-WAC

Duffy Dyer

- First Team All-WAC

Luis Lagunas

- First Team All-American
- College World Series All-Tournament Team

Rick Monday

- The Sporting News Player of the Year
- First Team All-American
- First Team All-WAC
- College World Series All-Tournament Team

Doug Nurnberg

- College World Series All-Tournament Team

John Pavlik

- Second Team All-American
- First Team All-WAC

== Sun Devils in the 1965 MLB draft ==
The following members of the Arizona State Sun Devils baseball program were drafted in the 1965 Major League Baseball draft.

Player	Position	Round	Overall	MLB team
Rick Monday	OF	1st	1st	Oakland Athletics
Glenn Smith	OF	2nd	34th	San Francisco Giants
Sal Bando	3B	6th	119th	Oakland Athletics
Jim Armstrong	SS	17th	322nd	Houston Astros
Duffy Dyer	C	38th	671st	Milwaukee Braves
Ray Stadler	C	38th	672nd	New York Mets
James Gretta	1B	46th	743rd	St. Louis Cardinals
Luis Lagunas	2B	48th	756th	Minnesota Twins
