= Larry Panciera =

American baseball coach (1921–1998)

Biographical details
- Born: October 11, 1921; Westerly, Rhode Island, U.S.
- Died: September 8, 1998 (aged 76); Weekapaugh, Rhode Island, U.S.
- Education: University of Rhode Island

Coaching career (HC unless noted)
- 1962–1979: Connecticut

Head coaching record
- Overall: 297–160–5

Larry Panciera (October 11, 1921 – September 8, 1998) was an American college baseball coach at the University of Connecticut where he led the Huskies to three College World Series appearances in eighteen seasons. Panciera coached the Huskies from 1962 through 1979, finishing with a 297–160–5 overall record.

== Early life ==
Panciera was born October 11, 1921, in Westerly, Rhode Island. He enrolled at Rhode Island State College in 1940 but joined the United States Army during World War II. After the war, he returned to college and played football and baseball for the Rhode Island Rams while completing his degree. After graduating, Panciera spent three years at Killingly High School in Danielson, Connecticut, serving as the school's first athletic director and coaching the football and baseball teams. Each team won state titles during his tenure.

== Coaching career ==
In 1950, Panciera joined the staff of the Connecticut Huskies football team, as freshman coach. Four years later, he added assistant coach of the baseball team under head coach J. O. Christian before succeeding him in 1962. In his career as head baseball coach from 1962 through 1979, the Huskies reached three College World Series and saw 40 players sign professional contracts. Panciera owns the highest winning percentage of all baseball coaches at UConn. He died on September 8, 1998, after a prolonged illness.

== Head coaching record ==
The following table shows Panciera's record as a head coach.

Record table
Season	Team	Overall	Conference	Standing	Postseason
Connecticut Huskies (Yankee Conference) (1962–1974)
1962	Connecticut	7–7–1	3–6–1		
1963	Connecticut	14–9	7–2	1st	NCAA Regional
1964	Connecticut	8–12–1	3–6–1		
1965	Connecticut	16–9	7–3	1st	College World Series
1966	Connecticut	12–6	7–3	T–1st	
1967	Connecticut	16–5	7–3		
1968	Connecticut	17–10	8–1	1st	NCAA Regional
1969	Connecticut	10–16	6–4		
1970	Connecticut	18–12	8–2	T–1st	NCAA Regional
1971	Connecticut	20–4	11–3		
1972	Connecticut	20–7	12–0	1st	College World Series
1973	Connecticut	10–8–1	4–2–1		
1974	Connecticut	12–9	4–3		
Connecticut:		181–114–3	87–38–3		
Connecticut Huskies (Eastern College Athletic Conference) (1975–1979)
1975	Connecticut	16–5–2			
1976	Connecticut	24–7			
1977	Connecticut	28–8			NCAA Regional
1978	Connecticut	17–14			
1979	Connecticut	31–13			College World Series
Connecticut:		116–47–2			
Total:		297–160–5			
National champion Postseason invitational champion Conference regular season champion Conference regular season and conference tournament champion Division regular season champion Division regular season and conference tournament champion Conference tournament champion
