= 1965 Major League Baseball draft =

Baseball draft of amateur players by Major League Baseball

General information
- Date: June 8–9, 1965
- Location: New York City

Overview
- First selection: Rick Monday; Kansas City Athletics
- First round selections: 20
- Hall of Famers: 3: C Johnny Bench; P Tom Seaver; P Nolan Ryan

The 1965 Major League Baseball draft was the inaugural, amateur draft. It was held on June 8–9 in New York City.

The Kansas City Athletics selected Arizona State sophomore Rick Monday as the number one pick. Kansas City also chose ten future major leaguers, including Sal Bando (6th round) and Gene Tenace (20th round), building the base for the Oakland Athletics' championship teams of the early 1970s.

A total of 813 players were selected. Some of the more significant picks were catcher Johnny Bench by the Cincinnati Reds in the second round, pitcher Nolan Ryan by the New York Mets in the twelfth round, and infielder Graig Nettles by the Minnesota Twins in the fourth round. The first player to reach the majors was pitcher Joe Coleman, the Washington Senators' first pick and third pick overall. Future Hall of Famer Tom Seaver was selected by the Los Angeles Dodgers in the 10th round but did not sign and returned to the University of Southern California campus.

== Key ==
Pick	Indicates the number of the pick
Player	Indicates the player selected
Team	Indicates the team making the pick
Position	Indicates the secondary/collegiate position at which the player was drafted, rather than the professional position the player may have gone on to play
*	Player did not sign with their team
^	Player made a Major League Baseball All-Star Game appearance
†	Member of the National Baseball Hall of Fame and Museum

== First round selections ==
Pick	Player	Team	Position	School (Location)	Ref
1	Rick Monday^	Kansas City Athletics	Outfielder	Arizona State University (Tempe, Arizona)	
2	Les Rohr	New York Mets	Left-handed pitcher	Billings West High School (Billings, Montana)	
3	Joe Coleman^	Washington Senators	Right-handed pitcher	Natick High School (Natick, Massachusetts)	
4	Alex Barrett	Houston Astros	Shortstop	Atwater High School (Atwater, California)	
5	Billy Conigliaro	Boston Red Sox	Outfielder	Swampscott High School (Swampscott, Massachusetts)	
6	Rick James	Chicago Cubs	Right-handed pitcher	Coffee High School (Florence, Alabama)	
7	Ray Fosse^	Cleveland Indians	Catcher	Marion High School (Marion, Illinois)	
8	John Wyatt	Los Angeles Dodgers	Shortstop	Bakersfield High School (Bakersfield, California)	
9	Eddie Leon*	Minnesota Twins	Shortstop	University of Arizona (Tucson, Arizona)	
10	Doug Dickerson	Pittsburgh Pirates	Outfielder	Ensley High School (Birmingham, Alabama)	
11	Jim Spencer^	Los Angeles Angels	First baseman	Andover High School (Glen Burnie, Maryland)	
12	Dick Grant	Milwaukee Braves	First baseman	Watertown High School (Watertown, Massachusetts)	
13	Gene Lamont	Detroit Tigers	Catcher	Hiawatha High School (Kirkland, Illinois)	
14	Al Gallagher	San Francisco Giants	Third baseman	Santa Clara University (Santa Clara, California)	
15	Scott McDonald	Baltimore Orioles	Right-handed pitcher	Marquette High School (Yakima, Washington)	
16	Bernie Carbo	Cincinnati Reds	Outfielder	Franklin High School (Livonia, Michigan)	
17	Ken Plesha	Chicago White Sox	Catcher	Notre Dame University (Notre Dame, Indiana)	
18	Mike Adamson*	Philadelphia Phillies	Right-handed pitcher	Point Loma High School (San Diego, California)	
19	Bill Burbach	New York Yankees	Right-handed pitcher	Wahlert High School (Dickeyville, Wisconsin)	
20	Joe DiFabio	St. Louis Cardinals	Right-handed pitcher	Delta State University (Cleveland, Mississippi)	

== Post-first round selections ==
The list of later selections is limited to those who have made at least one major league appearance.

Round	Pick	Player	Team	Position	School (Location)	Ref
2	21	Joe Keough	Kansas City Athletics	First baseman	Mt. San Antonio College (Walnut, California)	
2	24	Keith Lampard	Houston Astros	Outfielder	University of Oregon (Eugene, Oregon)	
2	26	Ken Rudolph	Chicago Cubs	Catcher	University of Nebraska (Lincoln, Nebraska)	
2	28	Alan Foster	Los Angeles Dodgers	Right-handed pitcher	Los Altos High School (Hacienda Heights, California)	
2	29	Del Unser*	Minnesota Twins	Outfielder	Mississippi State University (Mississippi State, Mississippi)	
2	31	Sandy Vance*	Los Angeles Angels	Right-handed pitcher	Pasadena High School (Pasadena, California)	
2	36	Johnny Bench^†	Cincinnati Reds	Catcher	Binger High School (Binger, Oklahoma)	
2	38	Larry Hisle^	Philadelphia Phillies	Outfielder	Portsmouth High School (Portsmouth, Ohio)	
2	39	Danny Thompson*	New York Yankees	Shortstop	Capron High School (Capron, Oklahoma)	
3	41	Bob Stinson*	Kansas City Athletics	Outfielder	Miami Senior High School (Miami, Florida)	
3	42	Joe Moock	New York Mets	Shortstop	Louisiana State University (Baton Rouge, Louisiana)	
3	43	Gene Martin	Washington Senators	Outfielder	Dougherty Comprehensive High School (Albany, Georgia)	
3	45	Ken Poulsen	Boston Red Sox	Third baseman	Birmingham High School (Van Nuys, California)	
3	51	Dick Baney*	Los Angeles Angels	Right-handed pitcher	Anaheim High School (Anaheim, California)	
3	53	Andy Messersmith*^	Detroit Tigers	Right-handed pitcher	University of California, Berkeley (Berkeley, California)	
3	55	Frank Tepedino	Baltimore Orioles	First baseman	Wingate High School (Brooklyn, New York)	
3	58	Bill Champion	Philadelphia Phillies	Right-handed pitcher	Shelby High School (Shelby, North Carolina)	
4	61	Ken Holtzman^	Chicago Cubs	Left-handed pitcher	University of Illinois at Urbana-Champaign (Urbana, Illinois)	
4	64	Charlie Vaughan	Milwaukee Braves	Left-handed pitcher	Brownsville High School (Brownsville, Texas)	
4	66	Ken Boswell	New York Mets	Second baseman	Sam Houston State University (Huntsville, Texas)	
4	68	Stan Bahnsen	New York Yankees	Right-handed pitcher	University of Nebraska (Lincoln, Nebraska)	
4	71	Bob Reed*	Detroit Tigers	Right-handed pitcher	University of Michigan (Ann Arbor, Michigan)	
4	73	Harry Parker	St. Louis Cardinals	Right-handed pitcher	Collinsville High School (Collinsville, Illinois)	
4	74	Graig Nettles^	Minnesota Twins	Third baseman	San Diego State University (San Diego, California)	
4	76	Pat Jacquez*	Houston Astros	Right-handed pitcher	Stagg High School (Stockton, California)	
4	79	Pete Koegel	Kansas City Athletics	Outfielder	Seaford High School (Seaford, New York)	
4	80	Fred Rath, Sr.	Chicago White Sox	Right-handed pitcher	Baylor University (Waco, Texas)	
5	85	Terry Harmon	Philadelphia Phillies	Shortstop	Ohio University (Athens, Ohio)	
5	87	Joe Henderson	Los Angeles Angels	Third baseman	Edison High School (Fresno, California)	
5	92	Rich Robertson	San Francisco Giants	Right-handed pitcher	Santa Clara University (Santa Clara, California)	
5	95	Amos Otis^	Boston Red Sox	Shortstop	Williamson High School (Mobile, Alabama)	
6	104	Wayne Garrett	Milwaukee Braves	Shortstop	Sarasota High School (Sarasota, Florida)	
6	105	Bob Chlupsa*	Philadelphia Phillies	Right-handed pitcher	Manhattan College (New York City)	
6	107	Clyde Wright^	Los Angeles Angels	Outfielder	Carson-Newman College (Jefferson City, Tennessee)	
6	117	Hal McRae^	Cincinnati Reds	Shortstop	Florida A&M University (Tallahassee, Florida)	
6	118	Bill Dillman	Baltimore Orioles	Right-handed pitcher	Wake Forest University (Winston-Salem, North Carolina)	
6	119	Sal Bando^	Kansas City Athletics	Third baseman	Arizona State University (Tempe, Arizona)	
7	121	Garry Jestadt	Chicago Cubs	Shortstop	Fremont High School (Sunnyvale, California)	
7	127	Marty Pattin^	Los Angeles Angels	Right-handed pitcher	Eastern Illinois University (Charleston, Illinois)	
7	128	Darcy Fast*	New York Yankees	Left-handed pitcher	North Thurston High School (Olympia, Washington)	
7	135	Jim Hutto	Boston Red Sox	Third baseman	Pensacola High School (Pensacola, Florida)	
7	139	Scott Reid*	Kansas City Athletics	Outfielder	Cerritos College (Norwalk, California)	
8	154	Ron Keller	Minnesota Twins	Right-handed pitcher	Indiana University (Bloomington, Indiana)	
8	157	John Morlan*	Cincinnati Reds	Outfielder	West High School (Columbus, Ohio)	
9	161	Joe Decker	Chicago Cubs	Right-handed pitcher	Petaluma High School (Petaluma, California)	
9	163	Garry Hill*	Washington Senators	Right-handed pitcher	Garinger High School (Charlotte, North Carolina)	
9	169	Vic Albury	Cleveland Indians	First baseman	Key West High School (Key West, Florida)	
10	185	Ken Szotkiewicz*	Philadelphia Phillies	Second baseman	Salesianum School (Wilmington, Delaware)	
10	189	Greg Washburn*	Cleveland Indians	Right-handed pitcher	Coal City High School (Coal City, Illinois)	
10	190	Tom Seaver*^†	Los Angeles Dodgers	Right-handed pitcher	USC (Los Angeles, California)	
10	191	Gary Taylor	Detroit Tigers	Right-handed pitcher	Central Michigan University (Mount Pleasant, Michigan)	
10	196	Danny Walton	Houston Astros	Outfielder	Bishop Amat Memorial High School (La Puente, California)	
10	199	George Lauzerique	Kansas City Athletics	Right-handed pitcher	George Washington High School (New York, New York)	
10	200	Ron Lolich	Chicago White Sox	Third baseman	Central Catholic High School (Pittsburgh, Pennsylvania)	
11	201	Tom House*	Chicago Cubs	Left-handed pitcher	Nogales (La Puente, California)	
11	206	Jim McAndrew	New York Mets	Right-handed pitcher	University of Iowa (Iowa City, Iowa)	
11	212	Chris Arnold	San Francisco Giants	Shortstop	Arcadia High School (Arcadia, California)	
11	216	Gary Gentry*	Houston Astros	Right-handed pitcher	Phoenix College (Phoenix, Arizona)	
12	226	Nolan Ryan^†	New York Mets	Pitcher	Alvin High School (Alvin, Texas)	
13	241	Darrell Evans*	Chicago Cubs	Third baseman	John Muir High School	
17	323	Dick Tidrow	Washington Senators	Right-handed pitcher	Mt. Eden High School	
18	342	Bob Moose	Pittsburgh Pirates	Right-handed pitcher	Franklin Area High School (Franklin, PA)	
18	356	Tom Murphy*	Houston Astros	Right-handed pitcher	Ohio University	
20	382	Gene Garber	Pittsburgh Pirates	Pitcher	Elizabethtown, Pennsylvania	
20	400	Gene Tenace^	Kansas City Athletics	shortstop	Lucasville, Ohio	
21	404	Ken Tatum*	Milwaukee Braves	Pitcher	Mississippi State University	
21	407	Doug Griffin	California Angels	Second baseman	El Monte High School (El Monte, CA)	
21	413	Dan McGinn*	St. Louis Cardinals	Pitcher	University of Notre Dame	
21	417	Charlie Sands	Baltimore Orioles	Catcher	Newport News (Newport News, VA)	
22	421	Freddie Patek^	Pittsburgh Pirates	Shortstop	Seguin, Texas	
22	430	Ron Bryant	San Francisco Giants	Pitcher	Davis, California	
23	447	Steve Arlin*	Detroit Tigers	Pitcher	Ohio State University	
23	453	Lowell Palmer*	Baltimore Orioles	Pitcher	Norte del Rio (Sacramento, CA)	
24	461	Steve Renko	New York Mets	First baseman/Pitcher	University of Kansas	
26	493	Tom Dettore	Pittsburgh Pirates	Pitcher	Canon McMillan (Canonsburg, PA)	
26	505	Paul Reuschel*	Cincinnati Reds	pitcher	Camp Point Central (Camp Point, IL)	
30	561	Lou Marone	Pittsburgh Pirates	Pitcher	San Diego Mesa College	
31	577	Jim Nelson	Pittsburgh Pirates	Pitcher	Burbank (Sacramento, CA)	
34	624	Tom Shopay	New York Yankees	Outfielder	Dean College	
35	636	Don Shaw	New York Mets	Pitcher	San Diego State University	
36	654	Jerry DaVanon*	Houston Astros	Outfielder	San Diego Mesa College	
37	662	Bill Butler	Detroit Tigers	Pitcher	Herndon (Herndon, VA)	
38	671	Duffy Dyer*	Milwaukee Braves	C-OF	Arizona State University	
39	683	Danny Frisella*	Milwaukee Braves	Pitcher	Washington State University	
55	777	John Sipin	St. Louis Cardinals	Shortstop	Watsonville High School (Watsonville, California)	
56	781	Rich Nye*	Houston Astros	Left-handed pitcher	University of California, Berkeley (Berkeley, California)	
68	817	Otis Thornton	Houston Astros	Catcher	Westfield High School (Docena, Alabama)	

Preceded by NONE	1st Overall Picks; Rick Monday	Succeeded by Steve Chilcott
