= 1965 NAIA World Series =

1965 NAIA baseball tournament
- 1965 NAIA World Series
- Teams: 8
- Format: Double elimination
- Finals site: Phil Welch Stadium; St. Joseph, Missouri
- Champions: Carson–Newman (1st title)
- MVP: Clyde Wright (P) (Carson–Newman)

The 1965 NAIA World Series was the ninth annual tournament hosted by the National Association of Intercollegiate Athletics to determine the national champion of baseball among its member colleges and universities in the United States and Canada.

The tournament was played at Phil Welch Stadium in St. Joseph, Missouri.

Carson–Newman defeated Omaha in the championship series, 3–2, to win the Eagles' first NAIA World Series.

Carson–Newman pitcher, and future MLB All Star, Clyde Wright was named tournament MVP.

== Bracket ==
First round	Second round	Semifinals	National Championship
Glassboro State	0
Omaha	3
Omaha	4
Sam Houston State	0
Sam Houston State	7
Southern	3
Omaha	1
Carson–Newman	4
Anderson (IN)	0
Western Washington State	3
Western Washington State	4
Carson–Newman	8
Carson–Newman	4
Wisconsin State–Whitewater	3	Carson–Newman	3
Omaha	2
Consolation first round	Consolation second round	Consolation third round	Consolation fourth round
Western Washington State	2
Glassboro State	10	Glassboro State	4	Omaha	7
Southern	0	Glassboro State	2	Glassboro State	5
Sam Houston State	0
Sam Houston State	7
Anderson	2	Wisconsin State–Whitewater	2
Wisconsin State–Whitewater	3

== See also ==
- 1965 NCAA University Division baseball tournament
