= Dean Taylor (baseball) =

American baseball executive

- Born: April 19, 1951 (age 75); Brawley, California, U.S.
- Other name: None
- Known for: Baseball, former general manager of the Milwaukee Brewers and former assistant general manager for the Atlanta Braves and the Kansas City Royals

Dean Taylor (born April 19, 1951) is an American former front office executive in Major League Baseball who most recently served as the vice president of baseball operations and assistant general manager for the Kansas City Royals.

Taylor began his major league front office career in 1981, working as the administrative assistant of minor league operations for Kansas City. Prior to that, he was a minor league general manager for four years and was named the 1979 Northwest League Executive of the Year while serving as general manager of the Eugene Emeralds. From 1982 to 1985, he served as assistant director of scouting and player development for the Royals, and while in that position he was credited with researching and developing the basis of the Royals successful protest involving the controversial Pine Tar Incident between the Royals and the New York Yankees on July 24, 1983. Following the Royals World Championship season in 1985, he was promoted to assistant to the general manager under general manager John Schuerholz, and he worked in that position until early 1990 when he joined the Major League Baseball Commissioner's Office as manager of baseball operations.

Prior to the 1991 season, Taylor was hired as assistant general manager of the Atlanta Braves under Schuerholz and contributed to eight consecutive National League Eastern Division titles and the 1995 World Series Championship. On September 21, 1999, he was hired as the senior vice president of baseball operations and general manager of the Milwaukee Brewers, a position he held until September 2002, when he was replaced by Doug Melvin. He spent the 2003 season as a consultant for the Los Angeles Dodgers before being named as assistant general manager of the Cincinnati Reds in December of that year.

Taylor returned to the Kansas City Royals in June 2006 as vice president of baseball operations and assistant general manager and contributed to the resurgence of the franchise over the next nine seasons. The Royals announced his retirement from baseball in January 2015, but he continued to serve the Royals as a consultant through the conclusion of the team's 2015 World Championship season, which marked his 40th year in baseball.

During his major league front office career, Taylor was associated with five League Championship teams and three World Championship teams. He was a member of the MLB Safety and Health Advisory Committee and served as chairman of the MLB Rules and Administration Committee during his tenure as the Brewers' general manager.

Taylor graduated from Mercersburg Academy in 1969 and Claremont McKenna College in 1973. He is a 1975 graduate of the Ohio University Sports Administration Program and was selected as the program's 2001 Distinguished Alumnus.

== Notes ==
Preceded by Sal Bando	Milwaukee Brewers General Manager; 1999–2002	Succeeded by Doug Melvin
