= Rick James (baseball) =

American baseball player (born 1947)

- Pitcher
- Born: October 11, 1947 (age 78); Sheffield, Alabama, U.S.
- Batted: Right Threw: Right

MLB debut
- September 20, 1967, for the Chicago Cubs

Last MLB appearance
- October 1, 1967, for the Chicago Cubs

MLB statistics
- Win–loss record: 0–1
- Earned run average: 13.50
- Innings pitched: 4 2/3
- Stats at Baseball Reference

Teams
- Chicago Cubs (1967)

Richard Lee James (born October 11, 1947) is an American former professional baseball player. A 6 ft 2 in (1.88 m), 205 lb (93 kg) right-handed pitcher, James was the Chicago Cubs' first #1 draft pick in the inaugural Major League Baseball draft of June 1965. Selected after his graduation from Coffee High School, Florence, Alabama, James had a six-season (1965–1970) professional career, but his Major League stay was only three games and 4 2/3 innings pitched — a proverbial "cup of coffee" — at the tail end of the 1967 season.

James was the sixth player selected in the first round of the first MLB Draft, following #1 overall choice Rick Monday (taken by the Kansas City Athletics), #3 overall Joe Coleman (Washington Senators), and just ahead of #7 pick Ray Fosse (Cleveland Indians); Baseball Hall of Fame catcher Johnny Bench was taken in the second round, 36th overall, by the Cincinnati Reds.

James was called up by the Cubs after a successful 1967 season split between the Double-A and Triple-A levels of minor league baseball. His first two appearances came in relief against the eventual 1967 world champion St. Louis Cardinals and the National League runners-up, the San Francisco Giants. James held them scoreless over 1 2/3 innings. But in his third game, this time as a starting pitcher against the Reds on the closing day of the season at Crosley Field, James lasted only three innings and was roughed up for seven earned runs and nine hits, including a home run (by Vada Pinson) and three doubles, and he was charged with the loss in a 10–3 Cincinnati triumph.

In 1968, James returned to the minors, and was selected by the San Diego Padres in the expansion draft following the 1968 season. James pitched through the 1970 season before leaving baseball at age 23.
