= 1965 Connecticut Huskies baseball team =

American college baseball season

1965 Connecticut Huskies baseball

Yankee Conference Champion NCAA District 1 playoff champion

College World Series, 1–2
- Conference: Yankee Conference
- Record: 16–9 (7–3 Yankee)
- Head coach: Larry Panciera (4th season)
- Home stadium: Gardner Dow Athletic Fields

1965 Yankee Conference baseball standings
	Conf.				Overall
Team	W		L	PCT	W		L	PCT
No. 6 Connecticut ‍†‍‡‍^{y}	7	–	3	.700	16	–	9	.640
Vermont ‍†‍‍	7	–	3	.700	11	–	5	.688
Maine ‍‍‍	6	–	4	.600	14	–	7	.667
UMass ‍‍‍	6	–	4	.600	7	–	11	.389
New Hampshire ‍‍‍		–		–	5	–	14	.263
Rhode Island ‍‍‍		–		–	3	–	15	.167
† – Conference champion ‡ – Playoff champion y – Invited to the NCAA tournament As of June 30, 1965; Rankings from Collegiate Baseball

The 1965 Connecticut Huskies baseball team represented the University of Connecticut in the 1965 NCAA University Division baseball season. The Huskies were led by Larry Panciera in his 4th year as head coach, and played as part of the Yankee Conference. Connecticut posted a 16–9 record, earned a share of the Yankee Conference with a 7–3 regular season and won the automatic bid to the 1965 NCAA University Division baseball tournament with a playoff win over Vermont. They then took two out of three from Holy Cross to win the NCAA District 1 playoff and reached the 1965 College World Series, their third appearance in the penultimate college baseball event. The Huskies lost their first game against Saint Louis before defeating Lafayette and being eliminated by Washington State.

== Roster ==
1965 Connecticut Huskies roster
- Louis Aceto; - Rich Baranowski; - Michael Erich; - Raymond Hartman; - Lee Johnson; - Douglas King; - Peter Mottla; - Robert Shaefer; - Peter Stoltzman; - Paul Wislocki	Pitchers: - Leo Bravakis - Senior; - Steve Gulyas - Senior; - Tom Lawton - Sophomore; Catchers: - Ed Carroll - Junior; Infielders: - Jimmy Penders - Senior; Outfielders: - Tommy Penders - Sophomore

== Schedule ==
1965 Connecticut Huskies baseball game log
Regular season

March
Date	Opponent	Site/stadium	Score	Overall record	YC record
	Middlebury*		W 5–0	1–0	
	Boston University*		W 1–0	2–0	
	American*		W 8–4	3–0	
	Wesleyan*		W 4–2	4–0	

April
Date	Opponent	Site/stadium	Score	Overall record	YC record
Apr 17	at Rhode Island	Kingston, RI	W 4–0	5–0	1–0
Apr 21	at UMass	Amherst, MA	L 0–3	5–1	1–1
Apr 23	Maine		W 2–1	6–1	2–1
Apr 24	Maine		L 2–3	6–2	2–2
Apr 29	at Yale*	Yale Field • New Haven, CT	W 8–2	7–2	
Apr 30	Vermont	Gardner Dow Athletic Fields • Storrs, CT	W 5–4	8–2	3–2

May
Date	Opponent	Site/stadium	Score	Overall record	YC record
May 1	at Vermont	Centennial Field • Burlington, VT	L 1–7	8–3	3–3
May 4	UMass	Gardner Dow Athletic Fields • Storrs, CT	W 4–1	9–3	4–3
May 8	at New Hampshire	Durham, NH	W 7–0	10–3	5–3
May 8	at New Hampshire	Durham, NH	W 6–3	11–3	6–3
May	Springfield*		L 3–6	11–4	
May	American*		L 1–6	11–5	
May 18	Holy Cross*		L 2–3	11–6	
May 22	Rhode Island		W 9–0	12–6	7–3

Postseason

Yankee Conference Playoff
Date	Opponent	Site/stadium	Score	Overall record
May 29	Vermont		W 5–0	13–6

NCAA tournament: District 1 playoff
Date	Opponent	Site/stadium	Score	Overall record	Regional Record
June 3	vs Holy Cross	Fenway Park • Boston, MA	W 7–4	14–6	1–0
June 3	vs Holy Cross	Fenway Park • Boston, MA	L 0–5	14–7	1–1
June 4	vs Holy Cross	Fenway Park • Boston, MA	W 7–0	15–7	2–1

College World Series
Date	Opponent	Site/stadium	Score	Overall record	CWS record
June 7	Saint Louis	Johnny Rosenblatt Stadium • Omaha, NE	L 1–2	15–8	0–1
June 8	Lafayette	Johnny Rosenblatt Stadium • Omaha, NE	W 6–4	16–8	1–1
June 12	Washington State	Johnny Rosenblatt Stadium • Omaha, NE	L 2–3	16–9	1–2
