= 1965 Texas Longhorns baseball team =

American college baseball season

1965 Texas Longhorns baseball

SWC champions

College World Series, 0–2
- Conference: Southwest Conference
- Record: 20–7 (11–4 SWC)
- Head coach: Bibb Falk (23rd year)
- Home stadium: Clark Field

1965 Southwest Conference baseball standings
	Conf.				Overall
Team	W		L	PCT	W		L	PCT
No. 8 Texas ‍†‍‍^{y}	11	–	4	.733	20	–	7	.741
No. 19 Texas A&M ‍‍‍	10	–	5	.667	16	–	7	.696
Baylor ‍‍‍	9	–	6	.600	18	–	7	.720
SMU ‍‍‍	6	–	9	.400	6	–	17	.261
Rice ‍‍‍	5	–	10	.333	10	–	15	.400
TCU ‍‍‍	4	–	11	.267	11	–	16	.407
† – Conference champion y – Invited to the NCAA tournament As of June 30, 1965; Rankings from Collegiate Baseball

The 1965 Texas Longhorns baseball team represented the University of Texas at Austin in the 1965 NCAA University Division baseball season. The Longhorns played their home games at Clark Field. The team was coached by Bibb Falk in his 23rd season at Texas.

The Longhorns reached the College World Series, finishing tied for seventh with losses to Washington State and Florida State.

== Personnel ==
=== Roster ===
1965 Texas Longhorns roster
Pitchers: John Collier; Tommy Moore; Catchers: James Scheschuk; Manager: Gordon Lakey	Infielders: Forrest Boyd; William Denman; Don Johnson; Butch Thompson; Buddy Young; Outfielders: Joe Gideon; Joe Hague; Gary Moore; Ward Summers	Unknown: Ronald Davis Bandy; Raymond R. Dulak; Robert Eugene Ross; Robert Ellis Wells; Minton White Jr.

== Schedule and results ==
Legend
Texas win
Texas loss
Tie

1965 Texas Longhorns baseball game log
Regular season

March
Date	Opponent	Site/stadium	Score	Overall record	SWC record
Mar 1	Sam Houston State Teachers College*	Clark Field • Austin, TX	W 18–2	1–0	
Mar 5	Oklahoma*	Clark Field • Austin, TX	W 16–6	2–0	
Mar 6	Oklahoma*	Clark Field • Austin, TX	W 15–3	3–0	
Mar 9	Texas Lutheran*	Clark Field • Austin, TX	W 9–1	4–0	
Mar 13	Texas A&M	Clark Field • Austin, TX	L 4–12	4–1	0–1
Mar 16	at TCU	TCU Diamond • Fort Worth, TX	W 5–4	5–1	1–1
Mar 22	Minnesota*	Clark Field • Austin, TX	L 1–4	5–2	
Mar 23	Minnesota*	Clark Field • Austin, TX	W 6–3	6–2	
Mar 27	at Rice	Houston, TX	W 3–2	7–2	2–1

April
Date	Opponent	Site/stadium	Score–	Overall record	SWC record
Apr 2	at SMU	Dallas, TX	W 5–0	8–2	3–1
Apr 3	at SMU	Dallas, TX	W 11–2	9–2	4–1
Apr 8	Rice	Clark Field • Austin, TX	W 9–1	10–2	5–1
Apr 9	Rice	Clark Field • Austin, TX	W 2–1	11–2	6–1
Apr 13	St. Mary's (TX)*	Clark Field • Austin, TX	W 7–2	12–2	
Apr 15	Parsons*	Clark Field • Austin, TX	W 7–1	13–2	
Apr 20	SMU	Clark Field • Austin, TX	W 15–1	14–2	7–1
Apr 23	at Baylor	Waco, TX	L 2–5	14–3	7–2
Apr 24	at Baylor	Waco, TX	W 5–4	15–3	8–2
Apr 27	Baylor	Clark Field • Austin, TX	L 1–4	15–4	8–3
Apr 30	TCU	Clark Field • Austin, TX	W 9–1	16–4	9–3

May
Date	Opponent	Site/stadium	Score	Overall record	SWC record
May 1	TCU	Clark Field • Austin, TX	W 8–7	17–4	10–3
May 7	at Texas A&M	Kyle Baseball Field • College Park, TX	W 5–1	18–4	11–3
May 8	at Texas A&M	Kyle Baseball Field • College Park, TX	L 5–6	18–5	11–4

Postseason

Exhibitions
Date	Opponent	Site/stadium	Score	Overall record
June 1	SMI Steelers	Clark Field • Austin, TX	W 6–2	19–5
June 3	SMI Steelers	Clark Field • Austin, TX	W 7–3	20–5

College World Series
Date	Opponent	Site/stadium	Score	Overall record	CWS record
June 7	Washington State	Johnny Rosenblatt Stadium • Omaha, NE	L 5–12	20–6	0–1
June 8	Florida State	Johnny Rosenblatt Stadium • Omaha, NE	L 2–3	20–7	0–2
