= Norm Angelini =

American baseball player (1947–2019)

- Pitcher
- Born: September 24, 1947; San Francisco, California, U.S.
- Died: December 21, 2019 (aged 72); Aurora, Colorado, U.S.
- Batted: Left Threw: Left

MLB debut
- July 22, 1972, for the Kansas City Royals

Last MLB appearance
- June 19, 1973, for the Kansas City Royals

MLB statistics
- Win–loss record: 2–1
- Earned run average: 2.75
- Strikeouts: 19
- Saves: 3
- Stats at Baseball Reference

Teams
- Kansas City Royals (1972–1973)

Norman Stanley "Norm" Angelini (September 24, 1947 – December 21, 2019) was an American professional baseball player who played for two seasons in Major League Baseball. He pitched for the Kansas City Royals for 21 games during the 1972 season and seven games during the 1973 season.

== Early life ==
Norman Stanley "Norm" Angelini was born on September 24, 1947, in San Francisco, California, and grew up in Half Moon Bay, California. He pitched for the Independents in the San Mateo City League in 1965, and threw back-to-back perfect games. Angelini attended Junípero Serra High School in San Mateo, California, where he excelled in baseball. “He makes the kids go fishing for that curve low and outside. He really fools ’em,” said Padres varsity baseball head coach Ken Houle. “He’s just coming into his own.” He graduated in 1965 and was inducted to the school's Athletic Hall of Fame in 2010.

== College career ==
Angelini attended the College of San Mateo from 1965 to 1968, where baseball head coach John Noce developed him into a good prospect. That resulted in Angelini getting drafted by three different teams. Angelini instead decided to attend Washington State University, where he played college baseball for the Cougars from 1968 to 1969. Two other pitchers and himself pitched a combined perfect game against the Western Washington Vikings to give Washington head coach Bobo Brayton his 200th career win. On May 22, 1969, while facing the Idaho Vandals, Angelini finished his college pitching career by striking out 18 batters. He was selected to the Pac-8 Second Team. Angelini was inducted into the College of San Mateo Athletics Hall of Fame in 2012.

== Professional career ==
=== Drafts and minor leagues ===
On June 7, 1966, Angelini was drafted by the Baltimore Orioles in the 47th round of the 1966 amateur draft, but he did not sign.

On January 28, 1967, Angelini was drafted by the Cincinnati Reds in the eighth round of the 1967 amateur draft (January Secondary), but he did not sign. On June 6, 1967, Angelini was drafted by the New York Yankees in the eighth round of the 1967 amateur draft (June Secondary), but he did not sign.

Before the 1969 MLB season, Angelini was signed by the Kansas City Royals as an amateur free agent. Angelini made his professional debut with the Winnipeg Goldeyes of the Northern League in 1969. He went 5–3 with a 3.00 ERA in 13 games, 10 of which were starts, and was named to the league’s All-Star team. He struck out 74 batters in 72 innings pitched and was promoted to the A-ball San Jose Bees of the California League in 1970. He started 17 games that season and went 8–8 with a 2.65 ERA.

By 1971, though, the organization seemed to think that Angelini would be better as a reliever. He pitched for the AA Elmira Royals of the Eastern League and made 20 relief appearances out of his 26 total games pitched. He completed four out of his six starts and had a 5–6 record and an outstanding 1.67 ERA. Again, he fanned more batters than innings pitched, with 79 strikeouts in 70 innings pitched. The Royals added him to their 40-man roster as a result of his good work.

Angelini was promoted to the AAA Omaha Royals in 1972 and was a lights-out reliever. He picked up six saves in 19 games and had a 1.41 ERA. His strikeout totals became even more impressive, with 66 strikeouts in 51 innings pitched.

In 13 Minor League Baseball seasons, he had an 81-67 record, 73 saves and a 3.31 ERA, with 949 strikeouts in 1,065 innings pitched.

=== Kansas City Royals (1972–1973) ===
==== 1972 ====
Angelini was called up to the Majors in July after the club demoted starter Jim Rooker. Manager Bob Lemon said that Angelini could work either as a starter or reliever. “We needed another lefty in the pen, but there’s a chance we’ll start him too. He’s leading the American Association in earned run average,” Lemon said. On July 22, 1972, at Municipal Stadium, in the top of the seventh inning and trailing 3–2 to the Baltimore Orioles, Angelini made his Major League debut, relieving Mike Hedlund and appearing as the third Royals pitcher in the ballgame. He would pitch 1 1/3 innings. Angelini gave up a two-run home run to first baseman Boog Powell on the first pitch and strike he threw in the Majors. He then struck out second baseman Davey Johnson swinging for his first career Major League strikeout. “[Powell] hit it and when I looked back it was like a knife in my back,” Angelini said. “But then I struck out Davey Johnson on four pitches and it pumped me up for the next inning.” Angelini pitched a scoreless eighth inning and the Royals proceeded to rally for four runs in the bottom of the eighth and ultimately won the game 8–5, making Angelini the winning pitcher in his Major League debut.

On August 14 at Municipal Stadium, in a 3–0 win over the New York Yankees, Angelini earned his first career save after getting the last 2 outs to finish the ballgame.

Angelini finished the 1972 season appearing in 21 games in relief. He finished with a 2–1 record and a 2.25 ERA, with 16 strikeouts and 12 walks in 16 innings. He also earned 2 saves.

==== 1973 ====
On June 19, 1973, at Royals Stadium, pitching against the Oakland Athletics, Angelini would appear in his final Major League game.

=== Atlanta Braves ===
On June 30, 1975, the Kansas City Royals had sent players to be named later and pitcher Bruce Dal Canton to the Atlanta Braves for a player to be named later and cash. On September 4, 1975, the Kansas City Royals named Angelini and pitcher Al Autry as the players to be named later and sent them to the Atlanta Braves to complete the earlier deal that was made on June 30. Angelini spent two seasons in the minor leagues with the Atlanta Braves organization.

=== Montreal Expos ===
Angelini spent four season in the minor leagues with the Montreal Expos organization.

Angelini finished his MLB career with a win–loss record of 2–1, a 2.75 earned run average, 19 strikeouts, and three saves.

== Personal life ==
Together with his wife Sue, Angelini has a son named Michael Aubrey. He was an avid golfer and old time movie watcher. Angelini died on December 21, 2019, in Aurora, Colorado, after battling cancer.
