= Chuck Brinkman =

American baseball player (born 1944)

- Catcher
- Born: September 16, 1944 (age 81); Cincinnati, Ohio, U.S.
- Batted: Right Threw: Right

MLB debut
- July 10, 1969, for the Chicago White Sox

Last MLB appearance
- August 4, 1974, for the Pittsburgh Pirates

MLB statistics
- Batting average: .172
- Home runs: 1
- Runs batted in: 12
- Stats at Baseball Reference

Teams
- Chicago White Sox (1969–1974); Pittsburgh Pirates (1974)

Charles Ernest Brinkman (born September 16, 1944) is an American former professional baseball player. He played as a catcher in Major League Baseball from 1969 until 1974, mostly for the Chicago White Sox until his final year with the Pittsburgh Pirates. He was the younger brother of Gold Glove Award-winning major league shortstop, Ed Brinkman.

== Early baseball career ==
Born in Cincinnati, Ohio, Brinkman attended Western Hills High School before enrolling at Ohio State University. He was a member of the Ohio State Buckeyes baseball team that reached the finals of the 1965 College World Series before losing to the Arizona State Sun Devils baseball team. Brinkman was named to the 1965 College World Series All-Tournament team.

The following year, Brinkman and the Ohio State Buckeyes once again reached the finals of the 1966 College World Series, where they defeated the Oklahoma State Cowboys baseball team to claim the national championship. Brinkman was once again named to the All-Tournament team.

== Major league career ==
Brinkman made his Major League debut at the age of 24 on July 10, 1969, pinch-hitting in a 12-2 loss to the Oakland A's at Comiskey Park and striking out against Blue Moon Odom. He went just 1-for-15 at the plate in the 1969 season. In 1973, Brinkman appeared in a career-high 63 games for the White Sox and hit the only home run of his career, one on May 23, 1973, against Rudy May of the California Angels in a 6-2 victory that temporarily kept Chicago in first place. According to an Associated Press story at the time, Brinkman arrived at his locker the next day to find the home run ball in a plastic case, a gift from his teammates.

The Pittsburgh Pirates purchased Brinkman's contract on July 11, 1974, so that they could replace injured backup catcher Mike Ryan. Brinkman played in his final major league game with the Pirates on August 4, 1974 at the age of 29.

His late brother, Ed Brinkman, was a longtime MLB shortstop, coach and scout.
