= 1965 Washington State Cougars baseball team =

American college baseball season

1965 Washington State Cougars baseball

AAWU Northern Division champion AAWU Champion District VIII champion

College World Series, T-3rd
- Conference: Athletic Association of Western Universities
- Northern
- Record: 33–8 (14–4 ND)
- Head coach: Chuck Brayton (4th season)
- Home stadium: Bailey Field

1965 Athletic Association of Western Universities baseball standings
	Conf.						Overall
Team	W		L		T	PCT	W		L		T	PCT
North Division
No. 4 Washington State ‍†‍‍^{y}	14	–	4	–	0	.778	33	–	8	–	0	.805
Oregon ‍‍‍	12	–	6	–	0	.667	27	–	8	–	1	.764
Oregon State ‍‍‍	7	–	11	–	0	.389	15	–	19	–	0	.441
Washington ‍‍‍	3	–	15	–	0	.167	17	–	24	–	0	.415
California Intercollegiate Baseball Association
No. 12 Stanford ‍‍‍	11	–	9	–	0	.550	32	–	13	–	0	.711
No. 14 California ‍‍‍	11	–	9	–	0	.550	29	–	14	–	0	.674
No. 23 UCLA ‍‍‍	10	–	10	–	0	.500	33	–	15	–	2	.680
No. 24 Southern California ‍‍‍	9	–	11	–	0	.450	30	–	15	–	1	.663
No. 17 Santa Clara ‍‍‍	7	–	13	–	0	.350	29	–	11	–	0	.725
UC Santa Barbara ‍‍‍	5	–	15	–	0	.250	15	–	27	–	0	.357
† – Conference champion y – Invited to the NCAA tournament As of June 30, 1965; Rankings from Collegiate Baseball

The 1965 Washington State Cougars baseball team represented the Washington State University in the 1965 NCAA University Division baseball season. The Cougars played their home games at Bailey Field. The team was coached by Chuck Brayton in his 4th year as head coach at Washington State.

The Cougars won the District VIII to advance to the College World Series, where they were defeated by the Ohio State Buckeyes.

== Roster ==
1965 Washington State Cougars baseball team
Players
Coaches

#	Pos.	Name	B/T	Height	Weight	Year	Home town
	LHP	Mike Avey	/L	—	—	Jr	Whittier, California
	OF	Bud Beemer	/	—	—
		Jim Brown	/	—	—
11	INF	Hal Brunstad	/	—	—	Jr	Kennewick, Washington
		Jim Doyle	/	—	—
		Ted Duckworth	/	—	—
		Ray Erickson	/	—	—
	RHP	Danny Frisella	L/R	5 ft 10 in (1.78 m)	185 lb (84 kg)	So	San Mateo, California
	RHP	Ed Fiskland	/R	—	—	So
	OF	Dale Ford	/	—	—	Sr	Olympia, Washington
	OF	Bob Fry	/	—	—
		Jim Lance	/	—	—
	INF	Wally Lito	/	—	—
	RHP	Doug Lukens	/R	—	—	Jr	Portland, Oregon
	LHP	Joe MacLean	/L	—	—		Puyallup, Washington
	C	John Olerud	/	—	—	Sr	Federal Way, Washington
		Gail Pintler	/	—	—
	INF	Duane Rossman	/	—	—
		Fred Sackett	/	—	—
	LHP	Bob Salisbury	/L	—	—	Sr	Bellingham, Washington
	INF	Larry Schreck	/	—	—	Sr	Spokane, Washington
	INF	Dale Scilley	/	—	—	So
	RHP	John Sloan	/R	—	—
		Roger Stauffer	/	—	—
	INF	Gary Strom	/	—	—
	RHP	Paul Taylor	/R	—	—

Head coach

Chuck Brayton

Assistant coach(es)

Legend

- (C) Team captain
- (S) Suspended
- (I) Ineligible
- Injured
- Current redshirt

Roster
Last update: September 9, 2021

== Schedule ==
1965 Washington State Cougars baseball game log
Regular season
March (5–0)

#	Date	Opponent	Site/stadium	Score	Overall record	PCC record
1	March 25	at Lewis–Clark State	Harris Field • Lewiston, Idaho	17–1	1–0	0–0
2	March 26	vs Eastern Washington	Harris Field • Lewiston, Idaho	10–0	2–0	0–0
3	March 26	vs Gonzaga	Harris Field • Lewiston, Idaho	3–2	3–0	0–0
4	March 27	vs Seattle	Harris Field • Lewiston, Idaho	13–1	4–0	0–0
5	March 27	vs Idaho	Harris Field • Lewiston, Idaho	5–3	5–0	0–0

April (14–3)

#	Date	Opponent	Site/stadium	Score	Overall record	AAWU record
6	April 2	at Yakima	Parker Field • Yakima, Washington	12–4	6–0	0–0
7	April 2	at Yakima	Parker Field • Pullman, Washington	6–0	7–0	0–0
8	April 5	at Nevada	Unknown • Reno, Nevada	9–4	8–0	0–0
9	April 6	at Nevada	Unknown • Reno, Nevada	7–3	9–0	0–0
10	April 10	at Sacramento State	John Smith Field • Sacramento, California	6–5	10–0	0–0
11	April 10	at Sacramento State	John Smith Field • Sacramento, California	5–0	11–0	0–0
12	April 13	at Gonzaga	Mulligan Field • Spokane, Washington	7–1	12–0	0–0
13	April 13	at Gonzaga	Mulligan Field • Spokane, Washington	0–1	12–1	0–0
14	April 16	Washington	Bailey Field • Pullman, Washington	7–0	13–1	1–0
15	April 17	Washington	Bailey Field • Pullman, Washington	5–0	14–1	2–0
16	April 17	Washington	Bailey Field • Pullman, Washington	4–3	15–1	3–0
17	April 21	at Idaho	MacLean Field • Moscow, Idaho	5–0	16–1	3–0
18	April 23	Oregon State	Bailey Field • Pullman, Washington	4–5	16–2	3–1
19	April 24	Oregon State	Bailey Field • Pullman, Washington	3–0	17–2	4–1
20	April 24	Oregon State	Bailey Field • Pullman, Washington	3–2	18–2	5–1
21	April 27	Oregon State	Bailey Field • Pullman, Washington	16–1	19–2	5–1
22	April 30	at Oregon	Howe Field • Eugene, Oregon	1–5	19–3	5–2

May (10–3)

#	Date	Opponent	Site/stadium	Score	Overall record	AAWU record
23	May 1	at Oregon	Howe Field • Eugene, Oregon	8–7	20–3	6–2
24	May 1	at Oregon	Howe Field • Eugene, Oregon	8–2	21–3	7–2
25	May 5	Idaho	Bailey Field • Pullman, Washington	1–3	21–4	7–2
26	May 7	at Oregon State	Coleman Field • Corvallis, Oregon	8–6	22–4	8–2
27	May 8	at Oregon State	Coleman Field • Corvallis, Oregon	9–2	23–4	9–2
28	May 8	at Oregon State	Coleman Field • Corvallis, Oregon	9–1	24–4	10–2
29	May 12	Idaho	MacLean Field • Moscow, Idaho	7–5	25–4	10–2
30	May 14	Oregon	Bailey Field • Pullman, Washington	2–0	26–4	11–2
31	May 15	Oregon	Bailey Field • Pullman, Washington	5–4	27–4	12–2
32	May 15	Oregon	Bailey Field • Pullman, Washington	11–12	27–5	12–3
33	May 21	at Washington	Graves Field • Seattle, Washington	2–1	28–5	13–3
34	May 22	at Washington	Graves Field • Seattle, Washington	2–1	29–5	14–3
35	May 22	at Washington	Graves Field • Seattle, Washington	2–3	29–6	14–4

Postseason
NCAA District VIII Playoff (2–0)

#	Date	Opponent	Site/stadium	Score	Overall record	AAWU record
36	May 29	vs Stanford	Bailey Field • Pullman, Washington	2–1	30–6	14–4
37	May 30	vs Stanford	Bailey Field • Pullman, Washington	13–3	31–6	14–4

College World Series (2–2)

#	Date	Opponent	Site/stadium	Score	Overall record	AAWU record
38	June 7	vs Texas	Johnny Rosenblatt Stadium • Omaha, Nebraska	12–5	32–6	14–4
39	June 8	vs Ohio State	Johnny Rosenblatt Stadium • Omaha, Nebraska	1–14	32–7	14–4
40	June 9	vs Connecticut	Johnny Rosenblatt Stadium • Omaha, Nebraska	3–2	33–7	14–4
41	June 10	vs Ohio State	Johnny Rosenblatt Stadium • Omaha, Nebraska	0–1	33–8	14–4

== Awards and honors ==
Danny Frisella

- First Team All-District VIII
- First Team All-Athletic Association of Western Universities

Bob Fry

- First Team All-Athletic Association of Western Universities

John Olerud

- First Team All-American
- First Team All-District VIII

Gary Strom

- First Team All-Athletic Association of Western Universities
