= Joe Moock =

American baseball player (born 1944)

- Third baseman
- Born: March 12, 1944 (age 81); Plaquemine, Louisiana, U.S.
- Batted: Left Threw: Right

MLB debut
- September 1, 1967, for the New York Mets

Last MLB appearance
- October 1, 1967, for the New York Mets

MLB statistics
- Batting average: .225
- Home runs: 0
- Runs batted in: 5
- Hits: 9
- Runs: 2
- Stats at Baseball Reference

Teams
- New York Mets (1967)

Joseph Geoffrey Moock (born March 12, 1944) is an American former professional baseball infielder who appeared in 13 games as a third baseman and pinch hitter in the Major Leagues for the New York Mets in 1967. Born in Plaquemine, Louisiana, he batted left-handed and threw right-handed, stood 6 feet 1 inch (1.85 m) tall and weighed 180 pounds (82 kg).

Moock attended Louisiana State University and was selected in the third round of the initial June amateur draft, held in 1965. In his second pro season, 1966 with the Auburn Mets, Moock led the New York–Penn League in hits with 146. He spent most of the first five months of the 1967 campaign on the MLB Mets' military list, in force during the Vietnam War period. He made his debut with New York on September 1, and started ten games during the waning months of the 1967 season, collecting nine hits, including two doubles, and five runs batted in.

Returning to the minor leagues for more playing time in 1968, he was acquired by the expansion Montreal Expos in 1969, but was never recalled to the majors. Moock retired after the 1970 minor-league season.

After his pro baseball days were over, Moock was a baseball coach at a private school in Louisiana.
