= 1965 Lafayette Leopards baseball team =

American college baseball season

1965 Lafayette Leopards baseball

Middle Atlantic champions District II champions

College World Series, T-7th
- Conference: Middle Atlantic Conference
- CB: No. 7
- Record: 20–7 (7–2 MAC)
- Head coach: Charlie Gelbert (20th season)
- Captain: George Hossenlopp
- Home stadium: Fisher Field

The 1965 Lafayette Leopards baseball team represented Lafayette College in the 1965 NCAA University Division baseball season. The Leopards played their home games at Fisher Field. The team was coached by Charlie Gelbert in his 20th year at Lafayette.

The Leopards won the District II Playoff to advanced to the College World Series, where they were defeated by the Connecticut Huskies.

== Roster ==
1965 Lafayette Leopards baseball team
Players
Coaches

#	Pos.	Name	B/T	Height	Weight	Year	Home town
	OF	Jim Burns	/	—	—	So
	INF	Ron Capioppe	/	—	—
	RHP	Preston Denby	/R	—	—	Sr
	OF	Gerry Goodwin	/	—	—	Sr
	C	George Hossenlopp (C)	/	—	—	Sr
	RHP	John Ireland	/R	—	—	Sr
	RHP	Bill Jasper	/	—	—	So
		Scott Johnson	/	—	—
	INF	Ed Kaminski	/	—	—
	OF	Dan Kristoff	/	—	—	Sr
	INF	Jack Ladden	/	—	—
		Bob Landreth	/	—	—
	LHP	Bill Loftus	/L	—	—	Jr
	RHP	Don Lorden	/R	—	—	Sr
	INF	Walt Manuel	/	—	—
	OF	Tony Savitsky	/	—	—	So
		Jack Waller	/	—	—	So
		Gabe Washo	/	—	—

Head coach

Charlie Gelbert

Assistant coach(es)

Legend

- (C) Team captain
- (S) Suspended
- (I) Ineligible
- Injured
- Current redshirt

== Schedule ==
1965 Lafayette Leopards baseball game log
Regular season
March (1–1)

#	Date	Opponent	Site/stadium	Score	Overall record	MAC record
1	March 24	at Richmond	Ernie Shore Stadium • Richmond, Virginia	3–0	1–0	–
2	March 24	at Richmond	Ernie Shore Stadium • Richmond, Virginia	0–10	1–1	–

April (8–2)

#	Date	Opponent	Site/stadium	Score	Overall record	MAC record
3	April 6	La Salle	Fisher Field • Easton, Pennsylvania	2–1	2–1	1–0
4	April 8	at Moravian	Unknown • Bethlehem, Pennsylvania	6–3	3–1	2–0
5	April 10	Colgate	Fisher Field • Easton, Pennsylvania	3–2	4–1	2–0
6	April 14	at Temple	Erny Field • Philadelphia, Pennsylvania	9–5	5–1	2–0
7	April 17	at Rutgers	Bainton Field • Piscataway, New Jersey	0–2	5–2	2–0
8	April 19	at Penn State	New Beaver Field • University Park, Pennsylvania	9–1	6–2	2–0
9	April 21	Columbia	Fisher Field • Easton, Pennsylvania	5–1	7–2	2–0
10	April 24	Gettysburg	Fisher Field • Easton, Pennsylvania	6–8	7–3	2–1
11	April 27	Muhlenberg	Fisher Field • Easton, Pennsylvania	9–2	8–3	3–1
12	April 28	Delaware	Fisher Field • Easton, Pennsylvania	7–2	9–3	4–1

May (6–1)

#	Date	Opponent	Site/stadium	Score	Overall record	MAC record
13	May 1	at Gettysburg	Unknown • Gettysburg, Pennsylvania	7–4	10–3	5–1
14	May 3	at Albright	Unknown • Reading, Pennsylvania	4–1	11–3	5–1
15	May 5	Rutgers	Fisher Field • Easton, Pennsylvania	8–2	12–3	5–1
16	May 8	at Lehigh	Unknown • Bethlehem, Pennsylvania	1–8	12–4	5–2
17	May 10	at Bucknell	Unknown • Lewisburg, Pennsylvania	6–4	13–4	6–2
18	May 12	at Villanova	Unknown • Philadelphia, Pennsylvania	9–2	14–4	6–2
19	May 15	Lehigh	Fisher Field • Easton, Pennsylvania	8–7	15–4	7–2

Postseason
District II Playoff (2–0)

#	Date	Opponent	Site/stadium	Score	Overall record	MAC record
20	May 28	vs Pittsburgh	Bill Clarke Field • Princeton, New Jersey	4–3	16–4	7–2
21	May 29	at Princeton	Bill Clarke Field • Princeton, New Jersey	5–4	17–4	7–2

May / June (3–1)

#	Date	Opponent	Site/stadium	Score	Overall record	MAC record
22	May 29	at Princeton	Bill Clarke Field • Princeton, New Jersey	5–4	18–4	7–2
23	June 1	Seton Hall	Fisher Field • Easton, Pennsylvania	4–8	18–5	7–2
24	June 5	at Lehigh	Unknown • Bethlehem, Pennsylvania	15–6	19–5	7–2
25	June 5	Lehigh	Fisher Field • Easton, Pennsylvania	4–3	20–5	7–2

College World Series (0–2)

#	pri	Opponent	Site/stadium	Score	Overall record	MAC record
26	June 7	vs Arizona State	Johnny Rosenblatt Stadium • Omaha, Nebraska	1–14	20–6	7–2
27	June 8	vs Connecticut	Johnny Rosenblatt Stadium • Omaha, Nebraska	4–6	20–7	7–2
