= Chuck Brayton =

American baseball player and coach (1925–2015)

Biographical details
- Born: October 20, 1925; Vancouver, Washington, U.S.
- Died: March 28, 2015 (aged 89); Pullman, Washington, U.S.
- Education: Washington State, 1950

Playing career
- 1944, 1946–1948: Washington State
- Position: Infielder

Coaching career (HC unless noted)
- 1951–1961: Yakima Valley JC
- 1962–1994: Washington State

Head coaching record
- Overall: 1,162–523–8 (.689) (WSU)
- Military career
- Allegiance: United States
- Branch: U.S. Army Air Forces
- Service years: 1944–1945

Frederick Charles Brayton (October 20, 1925 – March 28, 2015), alternately known as Chuck or Bobo, was an American college baseball head coach. Brayton led the Washington State Cougars baseball teams over 33 seasons, from 1962 to 1994. The winningest coach in WSU history, Brayton finished his career with a record of 1,162 wins, 523 losses and eight ties—the fourth-best total in NCAA history at the time of his retirement.

== Early life ==
Chuck Brayton was born on October 20, 1925 in Vancouver, Washington to parents Herbert and Hazel (Miller) Brayton. One of six children, Brayton moved with his family in October 1927 from Vancouver to central Skagit County in the northwestern part of the state. After the family settled in the small community of Birdsview, Washington, six miles west of Concrete, Brayton attended grade school in Birdsview and high school in Hamilton, Washington where he was senior class president and lettered in varsity sports.

Following high school graduation, Brayton hitchhiked across the state to Pullman as an incoming freshman at Washington State College (later Washington State University).

At the end of his college freshman year, Brayton enlisted in the Army Air Forces during the second half of World War II, serving for 18 months. Upon completion of his service, Brayton returned to college in Pullman where he was a three-sport varsity athlete at Washington State. In baseball during 1944, Brayton played the position of shortstop for interim coach Jack Friel and then during the 1946 to 1948 seasons for Buck Bailey. Brayton was named the college's first baseball All-American in 1947.

== Coaching career ==
After graduation from WSC, Brayton became head baseball coach for over a decade at Yakima Valley Junior College, in Yakima, Washington. Brayton also served as the school's head football coach for five seasons. His baseball coaching record at Yakima was 251–68 (.787) with ten championships over 11 seasons. While at Yakima, a line drive nearly killed him and he was hospitalized for a month; he wore a helmet the rest of his coaching career.

Brayton joined the coaching staff for WSC Cougar baseball in 1961. During his tenure there, Brayton's teams won 21 conference titles (two Northern Division and 19 Pac-8/10), including 11 in a row from 1970 to 1980. He led the Cougars to the College World Series in 1965 and 1976, and was the fifth baseball head coach in NCAA history to exceed a thousand wins. Win number 1,000 came in 1990 in his 29th season, at home on April 11, Following that milestone, he coached for four more years.

== Legacy ==
Brayton's #14 jersey was retired by the school in 2003;he was inducted into the National College Baseball Hall of Fame in 2007.

Bailey–Brayton Field, the Cougars' home stadium since 1980, is named for Brayton and his predecessor, Buck Bailey (1896–1964). When the old field was displaced by the new Mooberry track, Brayton constructed the new stadium on a budget, using items salvaged from Sick's Stadium in Seattle, as well as donated materials and volunteer labor. Formerly Buck Bailey Field, Brayton's name joined his mentor's in January 2000.

== Personal life ==
Brayton married Eileen Lyman on December 21, 1947, in Kirkland, Washington. After his move from Yakima Community College, the couple made their home in Pullman beginning in 1961, where they raised their three sons. Brayton and his wife were married for 67 years until his death in 2015 at age 89. He was buried at Pullman City Cemetery.

== Head coaching record ==
Record table
Season	Team	Overall	Conference	Standing	Postseason
Washington State Cougars (AAWU/Pac-8/Pac-10) (1962–1994)
1962	Washington State	18–12–1	8–5	3rd (North)	
1963	Washington State	24–8	7–7	3rd (North)	
1964	Washington State	31–9	10–6	2nd (North)	
1965	Washington State	33–8	14–4	1st (North)	College World Series
1966	Washington State	35–8–1	15–1	1st (North)	NCAA Regional
1967	Washington State	22–10	7–6	6th (North)	
1968	Washington State	29–9	11–7	3rd (North)	
1969	Washington State	27–15	8–13	t-6th (North)	
1970	Washington State	30–11–1	9–6	1st (North)	Pac-8 Tournament
1971	Washington State	34–15	7–8	1st (North)	Pac-8 Tournament
1972	Washington State	29–13	14–4	t-1st (North)	Pac-8 Tournament
1973	Washington State	40–15	15–3	1st (North)	Pac-8 Tournament
1974	Washington State	38–9	14–4	T-1st (North)	
1975	Washington State	33–18	13–5	1st (North)	NCAA Regional
1976	Washington State	43–15	16–2	1st (North)	College World Series
1977	Washington State	39–17	14–4	1st (North)	NCAA Regional
1978	Washington State	41–17	15–3	1st (North)	NCAA Regional
1979	Washington State	40–11	12–3	1st (North)	Pac-10 Tournament
1980	Washington State	36–10–2	11–3	1st (North)	Pac-10 Tournament
1981	Washington State	27–25–1	11–7	T-2nd (North)	
1982	Washington State	34–16	16–8	t-1st (North)	
1983	Washington State	40–16–1	16–8	2nd (North)	
1984	Washington State	41–20	15–6	T-1st (North)	NCAA Regional
1985	Washington State	45–22	16–8	1st (North)	Pac-10 North Tournament
1986	Washington State	35–24	11–12	4th (North)	Pac-10 North Tournament
1987	Washington State	44–19	18–6	1st (North)	NCAA Regional
1988	Washington State	52–14	18–4	1st (North)	NCAA Regional
1989	Washington State	37–20	16–8	1st (North)	Pac-10 North Tournament
1990	Washington State	48–19	19–5	1st (North)	NCAA Regional
1991	Washington State	37–25	14–6	1st (North)	Pac-10 North Tournament
1992	Washington State	31–23–1	16–14	2nd (North)	
1993	Washington State	34–24	16–13	T-3rd (North)	
1994	Washington State	35–26	11–19	5th (North)	
Washington State:		1162-523-8	423–218		
Yakima Valley JC:		251–68	(1951–1961)		
Total:		1413-591-8			
National champion Postseason invitational champion Conference regular season champion Conference regular season and conference tournament champion Division regular season champion Division regular season and conference tournament champion Conference tournament champion

== See also ==
- List of college baseball career coaching wins leaders
