= Rick Monday =

American baseball player (born 1945)

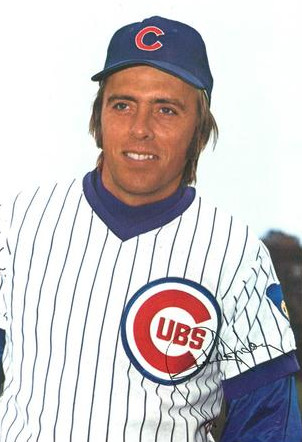
- Monday in 1973
- Center fielder
- Born: November 20, 1945 (age 80); Batesville, Arkansas, U.S.
- Batted: Left Threw: Left

MLB debut
- September 3, 1966, for the Kansas City Athletics

Last MLB appearance
- June 20, 1984, for the Los Angeles Dodgers

MLB statistics
- Batting average: .264
- Home runs: 241
- Runs batted in: 775
- Stats at Baseball Reference

Teams
- Kansas City / Oakland Athletics (1966–1971); Chicago Cubs (1972–1976); Los Angeles Dodgers (1977–1984)

Career highlights and awards
- 2× All-Star (1968, 1978); World Series champion (1981)

Robert James "Rick" Monday Jr. (born November 20, 1945) is an American former professional baseball player who now serves as a broadcaster. He played in Major League Baseball (MLB) as a center fielder from 1966 to 1984, most notably as a member of the Chicago Cubs and the Los Angeles Dodgers, the latter of which he won a World Series championship with in 1981.

A two-time All-Star, Monday played 19 seasons for the Kansas City/Oakland Athletics (1966–71), Chicago Cubs (1972–76) and Los Angeles Dodgers (1977–84). He was the first player selected in the inaugural 1965 Major League Baseball draft. He also received attention for a 1976 incident in which he prevented the American flag from being burned on the field at Dodger Stadium. After his playing career, he went on to serve as a Dodgers broadcaster on television and radio.

== Amateur career ==
=== High school ===
Monday was born in Batesville, Arkansas, and earned league honors in baseball at Santa Monica High School in Southern California. After graduating from high school, Monday considered whether to accept a scholarship to play college baseball or to play professional baseball. He was offered a $20,000 signing bonus by Tommy Lasorda, who was a scout for the Los Angeles Dodgers at the time; however, he was convinced to accept a scholarship to play for Arizona State University, after Sun Devils coach Bobby Winkles, an Arkansas native himself, drew upon their shared roots and promised Monday's Arkansas-born mother that he would take care of her son.

=== College ===
Monday joined the Arizona State Sun Devils team that included future major league players Sal Bando and Duffy Dyer. Reggie Jackson was allowed to practice with the team, but could not join the squad because the NCAA had a rule forbidding the use of freshman players. During his sophomore year, Monday became the team leader, posting a .359 batting average along with 34 extra-base hits to earn All-American honors. He led the Sun Devils to the 1965 College World Series championship (over Ohio State) and earned College Player of the Year honors.

== Minor leagues ==
Monday was the first overall selection in the inaugural Major League First-Year Player Draft in 1965 by the Kansas City Athletics. Monday signed with the A's for a $104,000 bonus on June 15. He began his professional career in the Single-A Northwest League with the Lewiston Broncs in Lewiston, Idaho. He singled in his professional debut on June 29 at Bethel Park in Eugene, Oregon, and played his first home game two nights later at Bengal Field in Lewiston. After the season, he and Bronc teammate Dave Duncan entered boot camp with the U.S. Marine Corps in San Diego in September, serving actively in the Reserve for six months before the beginning of spring training.

Monday played the 1966 season with the Mobile As of the Double-A Southern League in Mobile, Alabama. Mobile won the league title and five of its players were called up to the major league club in early September, including Monday, Sal Bando, and Rene Lachemann.

== Major leagues ==
Following his major league debut in September 1966, Monday began the next season in the majors, the A's last year in Kansas City. The team moved west to Oakland prior to the 1968 season, his first as an All-Star. Monday was with the A's through 1971, their first as American League West champions. He was traded for pitcher Ken Holtzman that November, and spent five productive seasons with the Chicago Cubs. In January 1977, Monday was traded in a five-player deal to the Los Angeles Dodgers for Bill Buckner and Iván DeJesús. The Dodgers won the National League pennant in 1977 and 1978.

Monday's best season in the major leagues came in 1976, his last with the Cubs. Batting in the leadoff position, he hit .272, establishing career highs in home runs (32), runs (107), RBI (77), total bases (271), slugging percentage (.507), and OPS (.853). He also finished 18th in the Most Valuable Player voting.

On May 16, 1972, Monday hit three home runs as a member of the Cubs against the Phillies in an 8–1 victory at Veterans Stadium.

Monday is known for his rivalry with pitcher Tom Seaver. Monday hit eleven home runs against Seaver, more than any other player, and batted .349 (30 hits in 86 at bats).

=== American flag incident ===
At Dodger Stadium in Los Angeles on April 25, 1976, two protesters from Eldon, Missouri, ran into left-center field and tried to set fire to an American flag after the start of the bottom of the 4th inning. Monday, the Cubs center fielder, had been tossing a practice ball with left fielder José Cardenal before the incident happened. After Ken Crosby of the Cubs threw a pitch that made Ted Sizemore pop out, Monday dashed over and grabbed the flag to thunderous cheers. Monday ran through the outfield with the flag and while walking towards the Dodgers dugout, met and handed the flag over to Dodgers pitcher Doug Rau. When Monday came to bat in the top half of the 5th inning, he got a standing ovation from the crowd and the scoreboard behind the left-field bleachers in the stadium flashed the message, "Rick Monday... You Made A Great Play..." He later said, "If you're going to burn the flag, don't do it around me. I've been to too many veterans' hospitals and seen too many broken bodies of guys who tried to protect it." Monday had served, while playing Major League Baseball, a six-year commitment with the United States Marine Corps Reserve as part of his ROTC obligation after leaving Arizona State. He received a congratulatory phone call from President Gerald Ford after the game, and was later invited to the White House.

The Los Angeles Police Department identified one of the protesters as 37-year-old William Errol Thomas Jr. Investigators confirmed that Thomas, who was born in Old Town, Maine and raised in Eldon, Missouri, confirmed that he drove from his home in Eldon to Los Angeles alongside his 11-year-old son days before the burning. Right after Monday snagged the flag from them, Thomas threw an empty can of lighter fluid at Monday, but missed. His 11-year-old son, the other protester, was never identified because of his age. Thomas explained to the court that his motive was related to his wife's imprisonment at a Missouri mental health facility and attempted to take revenge. Thomas pleaded guilty to a single trespassing charge, and was sentenced to three days in jail and a $60 fine.

On August 25, 2008, Monday was presented with an American flag flown over Valley Forge National Historical Park in honor of his 1976 bicentennial flag rescue. During a game at Dodger Stadium on September 2, 2008, Monday was presented with a Peace On Earth Medallion and a medallion lapel pin by Patricia Kennedy, founder of the non-profit organization Step Up 4 Vets, for his actions. In 2025, he was presented with the "Patriot Award" from the Bob Feller Act of Valor Federation.

Monday was granted permission to keep the flag from the incident after Thomas’ court proceedings. He has since brought it out for anniversary celebrations in 2016 and 2026, for a military charity tour in the former and at a ceremony at Dodger Stadium during a series between the Dodgers and Cubs for the latter. During the 2026 ceremony, Monday announced that he would be donating the flag to the National Baseball Hall of Fame and Museum in July.

In 2016, Dodgers’ historian Mark Langill told a Vice magazine reporter on the two biggest mysteries: "What happened to the Kirk Gibson home-run ball and what happened to the two people who tried to burn the American flag?" As a result, the Vice Magazine reporter tracked down the son of Thomas, who was 51 at the time, for an interview. He explained to Vice that Thomas' wife died from natural causes in 2012, adding that his father was still alive but refused to talk to him.

=== Blue Monday ===
In the deciding Game 5 of the 1981 NLCS at Olympic Stadium in Montreal, Monday hit a two-out ninth-inning home run off the Expos' Steve Rogers. The Dodgers won 2–1. Heartbroken Expos fans have referred to the day as "Blue Monday." Monday and Steve Yeager were asked to leave a restaurant in Montreal in 1982 because, according to the manager, six of the patrons wanted to fight with Monday.

== Broadcasting career ==
Soon after his retirement as a player, Monday became a broadcaster for the Dodgers. He began in 1985 by hosting the pre-game show and calling play-by-play on cable TV. From 1989 to 1992, Monday moved farther south to call San Diego Padres games alongside Jerry Coleman, replacing outgoing announcer Dave Campbell. He was also a sports anchor at KTTV for a time in the 1980s. In addition, he served as a color commentator for CBS-TV at the College World Series championship game in 1988. Monday rejoined the Dodgers in 1993 after Don Drysdale's unexpected death from a heart attack in Montreal before a road game against the Expos.

From 2005 to 2008, Monday mostly handled the analyst role, with Charley Steiner handling most of the play-by-play, except during road trips outside of the National League West division, during which Steiner broadcast the games on television (because until Vin Scully's retirement at the end of the 2016 season Vin Scully limited his broadcasting to all home games and road games involving either the NL West or AL West,) and Monday handled the radio play-by-play, usually with Jerry Reuss as his analyst.

In 2009, Steiner (play-by-play) and Monday (analysis) began covering all games on radio, with Eric Collins doing TV play-by-play for games not covered by Scully. When Steiner replaced Collins on the road TV broadcasts in 2014, Monday switched over to the play-by-play duties alongside Nomar Garciaparra.

== See also ==
- List of Major League Baseball career home run leaders

Preceded by none	First overall pick in the MLB Entry Draft; 1965	Succeeded by Steve Chilcott
Preceded by César Cedeño	National League Player of the Month; April 1978	Succeeded by Jack Clark
