= 1965 NCAA University Division baseball season =

Baseball season

NCAA tournament

College World Series
- Champions: Arizona State (1st title)
- Runners-up: Ohio State (2nd CWS Appearance)
- Winning coach: Bobby Winkles (1st title)
- MOP: Sal Bando (Arizona State)

Seasons
- ← 1964 1966 →

The 1965 NCAA University Division baseball season, play of college baseball in the United States organized by the National Collegiate Athletic Association (NCAA) began in the spring of 1965. The season progressed through the regular season and concluded with the 1965 College World Series. The College World Series, held for the nineteenth time in 1965, consisted of one team from each of eight geographical districts and was held in Omaha, Nebraska at Johnny Rosenblatt Stadium as a double-elimination tournament. Arizona State claimed the championship.

== Conference winners ==
This is a partial list of conference champions from the 1965 season. Each of the eight geographical districts chose, by various methods, the team that would represent them in the NCAA tournament. 10 teams earned automatic bids by winning their conference championship while 13 teams earned at-large selections.

Conference	Regular season winner	Conference Tournament	Tournament City	Tournament Winner
Athletic Association of Western Universities	Washington State	No Conference Tournament		
Atlantic Coast Conference	Maryland	No Conference Tournament		
Big Eight Conference	Missouri	No Conference Tournament		
Big Ten Conference	Ohio State	No Conference Tournament		
CIBA	Stanford	No Conference Tournament		
EIBL	Army	No Conference Tournament		
Mid-American Conference	Ohio	No Conference Tournament		
Southeastern Conference	Mississippi State	No Conference Tournament		
Southern Conference	Furman	No Conference Tournament		
Southwest Conference	Texas	No Conference Tournament		
Western Athletic Conference	Arizona State	1965 Western Athletic Conference Baseball Championship Series	Phoenix, Arizona	Arizona State
Yankee Conference	Connecticut/Vermont	1965 Yankee Conference baseball playoff		Connecticut

== Conference standings ==
The following is an incomplete list of conference standings:

1965 Athletic Association of Western Universities baseball standings
	Conf.						Overall
Team	W		L		T	PCT	W		L		T	PCT
North Division
No. 4 Washington State ‍†‍‍^{y}	14	–	4	–	0	.778	33	–	8	–	0	.805
Oregon ‍‍‍	12	–	6	–	0	.667	27	–	8	–	1	.764
Oregon State ‍‍‍	7	–	11	–	0	.389	15	–	19	–	0	.441
Washington ‍‍‍	3	–	15	–	0	.167	17	–	24	–	0	.415
California Intercollegiate Baseball Association
No. 12 Stanford ‍‍‍	11	–	9	–	0	.550	32	–	13	–	0	.711
No. 14 California ‍‍‍	11	–	9	–	0	.550	29	–	14	–	0	.674
No. 23 UCLA ‍‍‍	10	–	10	–	0	.500	33	–	15	–	2	.680
No. 24 Southern California ‍‍‍	9	–	11	–	0	.450	30	–	15	–	1	.663
No. 17 Santa Clara ‍‍‍	7	–	13	–	0	.350	29	–	11	–	0	.725
UC Santa Barbara ‍‍‍	5	–	15	–	0	.250	15	–	27	–	0	.357
† – Conference champion y – Invited to the NCAA tournament As of June 30, 1965; Rankings from Collegiate Baseball

1965 Southwest Conference baseball standings
	Conf.				Overall
Team	W		L	PCT	W		L	PCT
No. 8 Texas ‍†‍‍^{y}	11	–	4	.733	20	–	7	.741
No. 19 Texas A&M ‍‍‍	10	–	5	.667	16	–	7	.696
Baylor ‍‍‍	9	–	6	.600	18	–	7	.720
SMU ‍‍‍	6	–	9	.400	6	–	17	.261
Rice ‍‍‍	5	–	10	.333	10	–	15	.400
TCU ‍‍‍	4	–	11	.267	11	–	16	.407
† – Conference champion y – Invited to the NCAA tournament As of June 30, 1965; Rankings from Collegiate Baseball

1965 Big Ten Conference baseball standings
	Conf.				Overall
Team	W		L	PCT	W		L	PCT
No. 2 Ohio State ‍†‍‍^{y}	11	–	2	.846	30	–	13	.698
No. 15 Michigan ‍‍‍	10	–	5	.667	10	–	5	.667
No. 21 Michigan State ‍‍‍	9	–	6	.600	28	–	11	.718
Iowa ‍‍‍	7	–	5	.583	13	–	12	.520
Illinois ‍‍‍	8	–	6	.571	8	–	6	.571
Indiana ‍‍‍	6	–	7	.462	20	–	15	.571
Minnesota ‍‍‍	5	–	7	.417	5	–	7	.417
Purdue ‍‍‍	5	–	7	.417	14	–	11	.560
Wisconsin ‍‍‍	6	–	9	.400	6	–	9	.400
Northwestern ‍‍‍	1	–	14	.067	1	–	14	.067
† – Conference champion y – Invited to the NCAA tournament As of June 30, 1965; Rankings from Collegiate Baseball

1965 Western Athletic Conference baseball standings
	Conf.				Overall
Team	W		L	PCT	W		L	PCT
Northern
No. 22 Utah ‍‍‍	7	–	5	.583	21	–	16	.568
Wyoming ‍‍‍	7	–	5	.583	16	–	22	.421
BYU ‍‍‍	4	–	8	.333	21	–	15	.583
Southern
No. 1 Arizona State ‍†‍‍^{y}	9	–	3	.750	54	–	8	.871
No. 25 Arizona ‍‍‍	7	–	5	.583	37	–	13	.740
New Mexico ‍‍‍	2	–	10	.167	18	–	19	.486
† – Conference champion y – Invited to the NCAA tournament As of June 30, 1965; Rankings from Collegiate Baseball

1965 NCAA University Division District 3 baseball independents standings
	Conf.						Overall
Team	W		L		T	PCT	W		L		T	PCT
No. 6 Florida State ‍‍‍^{y}		–		–		–	32	–	11	–	1	.739
Georgia Tech ‍‍‍		–		–		–	20	–	8	–	0	.714
Elon ‍‍‍		–		–		–	22	–	13	–	0	.629
Mercer ‍‍‍		–		–		–	13	–	8	–	0	.619
Campbell ‍‍‍		–		–		–	7	–	8	–	0	.467
Stetson ‍‍‍		–		–		–	11	–	19	–	0	.367
Georgetown ‍‍‍		–		–		–	8	–	9	–	0	.471
South Alabama ‍‍‍		–		–		–	3	–	12	–	0	.200
Jacksonville ‍‍‍		–		–		–	5	–	23	–	0	.179
y – Invited to the NCAA tournament As of June 30, 1965; Rankings from Collegiate Baseball

1965 Yankee Conference baseball standings
	Conf.				Overall
Team	W		L	PCT	W		L	PCT
No. 6 Connecticut ‍†‍‡‍^{y}	7	–	3	.700	16	–	9	.640
Vermont ‍†‍‍	7	–	3	.700	11	–	5	.688
Maine ‍‍‍	6	–	4	.600	14	–	7	.667
UMass ‍‍‍	6	–	4	.600	7	–	11	.389
New Hampshire ‍‍‍	3	–	7	.300	5	–	14	.263
Rhode Island ‍‍‍	1	–	9	.100	3	–	15	.167
† – Conference champion ‡ – Playoff champion y – Invited to the NCAA tournament As of June 30, 1965; Rankings from Collegiate Baseball

== College World Series ==
The 1965 season marked the nineteenth NCAA baseball tournament, which culminated with the eight team College World Series. The College World Series was held in Omaha, Nebraska. The eight teams played a double-elimination format, with Arizona State claiming their first championship with a 2–1 win over Ohio State in the final.

Upper round 1
Ohio State	2
Florida State	1
Washington State	12
Texas	5
Arizona State	14
Lafayette	1
Saint Louis	2
Connecticut	1

Upper round 2
Ohio State	14
Washington State	1
Arizona State	13
Saint Louis	3
Lower round 1
Florida State	3
Texas	2
Lafayette	4
Connecticut	6

Upper final
Ohio State	4
Arizona State	9
Lower round 2
Saint Louis	5
Florida State	3
Washington State	3
Connecticut	2

Semifinals
Arizona State	6
Saint Louis	2
Ohio State	1^{15}
Washington State	0

Final
Arizona State	3	2
Ohio State	7	1
