= Randy Brown (baseball) =

American baseball player (1943–1998)

- Catcher
- Born: August 29, 1943; Leesburg, Florida, U.S.
- Died: April 13, 1998 (aged 54); Maitland, Florida, U.S.
- Batted: Left Threw: Right

MLB debut
- September 11, 1969, for the California Angels

Last MLB appearance
- September 20, 1970, for the California Angels

MLB statistics
- Batting average: .138
- Hits: 4
- Runs batted in: 0
- Stats at Baseball Reference

Teams
- California Angels (1969–1970)

Edwin Randolph Brown (August 29, 1943 – April 13, 1998) was an American professional baseball player who played two seasons for the California Angels of Major League Baseball.
