= Al Schmelz =

American baseball player (born 1943)

- Pitcher
- Born: November 12, 1943 (age 82); Whittier, California, U.S.
- Batted: Right Threw: Right

MLB debut
- September 7, 1967, for the New York Mets

Last MLB appearance
- September 24, 1967, for the New York Mets

MLB statistics
- Record: 0-0
- Earned run average: 3.00
- Strikeouts: 2
- Stats at Baseball Reference

Teams
- New York Mets (1967)

Alan George Schmelz (born November 12, 1943) is an American former Major League Baseball pitcher who played for the New York Mets in 1967.

== Early life ==
Prior to playing professionally, Schmelz attended Arizona State University.

== Major league career ==
Schmelz made two appearances in the major leagues. His first came on September 7 when the then 23-year-old rookie pitched against the St. Louis Cardinals in relief of Jerry Hinsley. He threw two innings and allowed one run of three hits and a walk. He also struck out two batters, including future Hall of Famer Orlando Cepeda.

His next, and final, appearance came on September 24. He came into the game to relieve Don Cardwell and, despite giving up a hit, left the game without surrendering a run.

Overall, he went 0-0 with a 3.00 ERA in his two-game career. In three innings, he allowed four hits, a home run and a walk.

== Minor league career ==
Schmelz pitched in the minor leagues from 1966 to 1969 in the Mets' (1966–1969), Oakland Athletics (1968) and Pittsburgh Pirates (1969) systems. Overall, he went 29-36 with a 3.13 ERA in 93 games (91 starts).

He showed flashes of excellence at times throughout his career. For example, in his first professional season, he went 15-5 with a 2.97 ERA for the Auburn Mets and Williamsport Mets. The following year, he posted a 2.60 ERA for Williamsport.
