= Sal Bando =

American baseball player and executive (1944–2023)

- Bando in 1969
- Third baseman
- Born: February 13, 1944; Cleveland, Ohio, U.S.
- Died: January 20, 2023 (aged 78); Oconomowoc, Wisconsin, U.S.
- Batted: Right Threw: Right

MLB debut
- September 3, 1966, for the Kansas City Athletics

Last MLB appearance
- October 3, 1981, for the Milwaukee Brewers

MLB statistics
- Batting average: .254
- Home runs: 242
- Runs batted in: 1,039
- Stats at Baseball Reference

Teams
- Kansas City / Oakland Athletics (1966–1976); Milwaukee Brewers (1977–1981)

Career highlights and awards
- 4× All-Star (1969, 1972–1974); 3× World Series champion (1972–1974); Oakland Athletics Hall of Fame; Milwaukee Brewers Wall of Honor

Salvatore Leonard Bando (February 13, 1944 – January 20, 2023) was an American professional baseball player and general manager. He played in Major League Baseball as a third baseman from 1966 to 1981, most prominently as the captain of the Oakland Athletics dynasty that won three consecutive World Series championships between 1972 and 1974.

A four-time All-Star player, Bando averaged 23 home runs and 90 runs batted in over an eight-year span. Although he was often overshadowed by his contemporary, Hall of Fame third baseman Brooks Robinson, Bando finished second, third, and fourth in the American League (AL) Most Valuable Player Award voting from 1971 to 1974. He ended his playing career with the Milwaukee Brewers.

After his playing career, Bando served as a special assistant with the Brewers before serving as the team's General Manager from October 1991 until August 1999. He was inducted into the National College Baseball Hall of Fame in 2013 and, in 2022 Bando was inducted into the Athletics Hall of Fame.

== Playing career ==
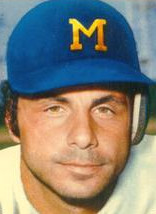
Bando c. 1977

Bando attended Warrensville Heights High School, where he played baseball, football, basketball, and ran track. He attended Arizona State University, where he played college baseball for the Arizona State Sun Devils under coach Bobby Winkles. He was a member of the 1965 College World Series champions and was named the College World Series Most Outstanding Player.

The Kansas City Athletics of Major League Baseball (MLB) selected Bando in the sixth round of the 1965 MLB draft. He made his MLB debut for the Athletics in 1966. Manager Hank Bauer named Bando team captain on May 30, 1969. He was named the starting third baseman for the American League in the 1969 MLB All-Star Game. Bando remains the only player to officially serve as captain of the A's in the franchise's long history.

During the "Swingin' A's" era of 1971 to 1975, Bando was named to three consecutive All-Star Games (1972–1974) and he was runner-up for the 1971 American League (AL) Most Valuable Player Award, won by teammate Vida Blue, after helping lead the team to the first of five straight division titles. In 1973, he led the American League with 64 extra-base hits, 32 doubles, and 295 total bases. Bando remained a strong MVP candidate through Oakland's championship run, finishing third and fourth in the voting in 1973 and 1974.

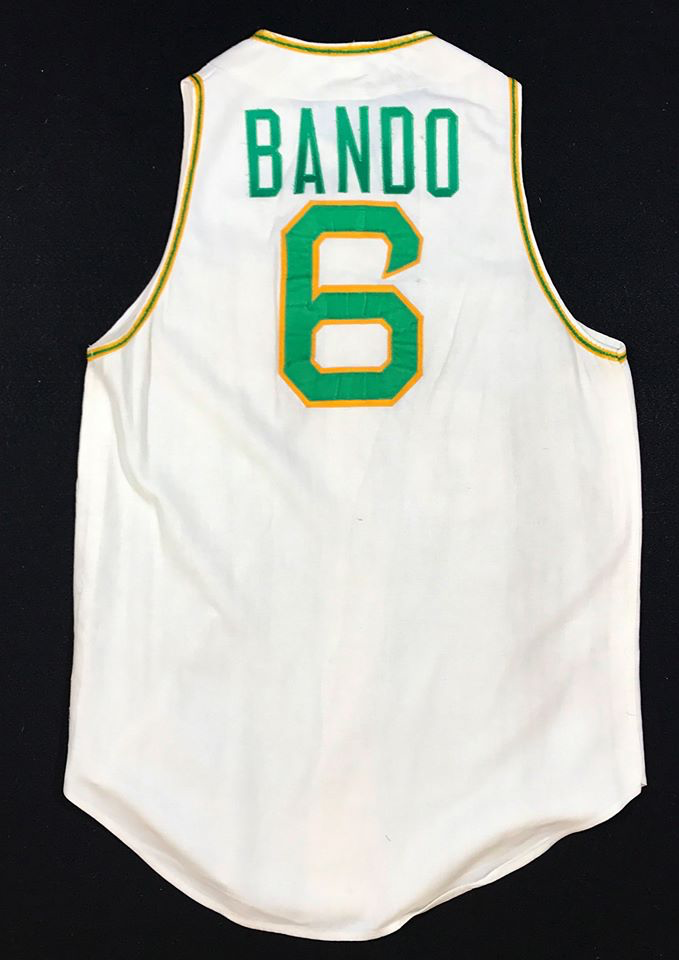
1970 Oakland Athletics No. 6 Sal Bando Game Worn Jersey

After years of combative relations with team owner Charlie Finley, Bando signed a five-year contract worth $1.5 million with the Milwaukee Brewers after the 1976 season, spending his last five seasons with the club.

During spring training in 1981, he announced that it would be his last season. Bando batted 5-for-17 (.294) with three doubles in the 1981 American League Division Series, Milwaukee's first MLB postseason appearance. Bando retired after the 1981 season. In a 16-season career, Bando had a .254 batting average with 242 home runs and 1,039 RBIs in 2,019 games played.

At the end of his career, Bando ranked third in AL history with 1,896 career games at third base, and also ranked fourth in league history in assists (3,720), tied for fourth in double plays (345), and tenth in putouts (1,647); his 235 home runs as a third baseman ranked third in AL history. His 789 RBI as an Oakland player were a record until Mark McGwire passed him in 1996, and his 192 home runs with the team were a record for a right-handed hitter in Oakland until Jose Canseco passed him in 1991.

=== Post-playing career ===
After retiring, Bando became a special assistant to Milwaukee's general manager, Harry Dalton, focusing on scouting and coaching during spring training. He served in the part-time position until 1991. He served as a color analyst for NBC, teaming with Bob Costas in 1982.

Bando was named the Brewers' general manager on October 8, 1991, succeeding Dalton. That month, he fired manager Tom Trebelhorn and hired Phil Garner, a former Athletics teammate, to succeed him; Garner had no managerial experience. Bando and Garner had only one winning team, the 1992 Brewers.

After the 1992 season, the club did not negotiate with free agent Paul Molitor or offer him salary arbitration until close to the deadline. At the time, Bando said that the team would view Molitor as a designated hitter rather than a position player. Molitor, who had entered the offseason wanting to re-sign with the Brewers, signed with the Toronto Blue Jays, who won the 1993 World Series with Molitor being named the World Series MVP. Bando held his position as GM until August 12, 1999, resigning the position after Garner was fired. Bando was replaced by former Atlanta Braves assistant GM Dean Taylor.

Bando did a voice cameo in the 2006 episode of The Simpsons titled "Regarding Margie."

Bando was CEO of The Middleton Doll Company, a Columbus, Ohio, enterprise with multiple other businesses associated with it. Both he and Jon McGlocklin established the firm, which was originally the Bando McGlocklin Capital Corporation, in 1979. The name changed to its current form on May 4, 2001, to reflect its acquisition of Lee Middleton Original Dolls Inc.

The National College Baseball Hall of Fame inducted Bando in 2013. He was an inaugural member of the Milwaukee Brewers Wall of Honor in 2014 and was inducted into the Oakland Athletics Hall of Fame in 2022.

== Personal life ==
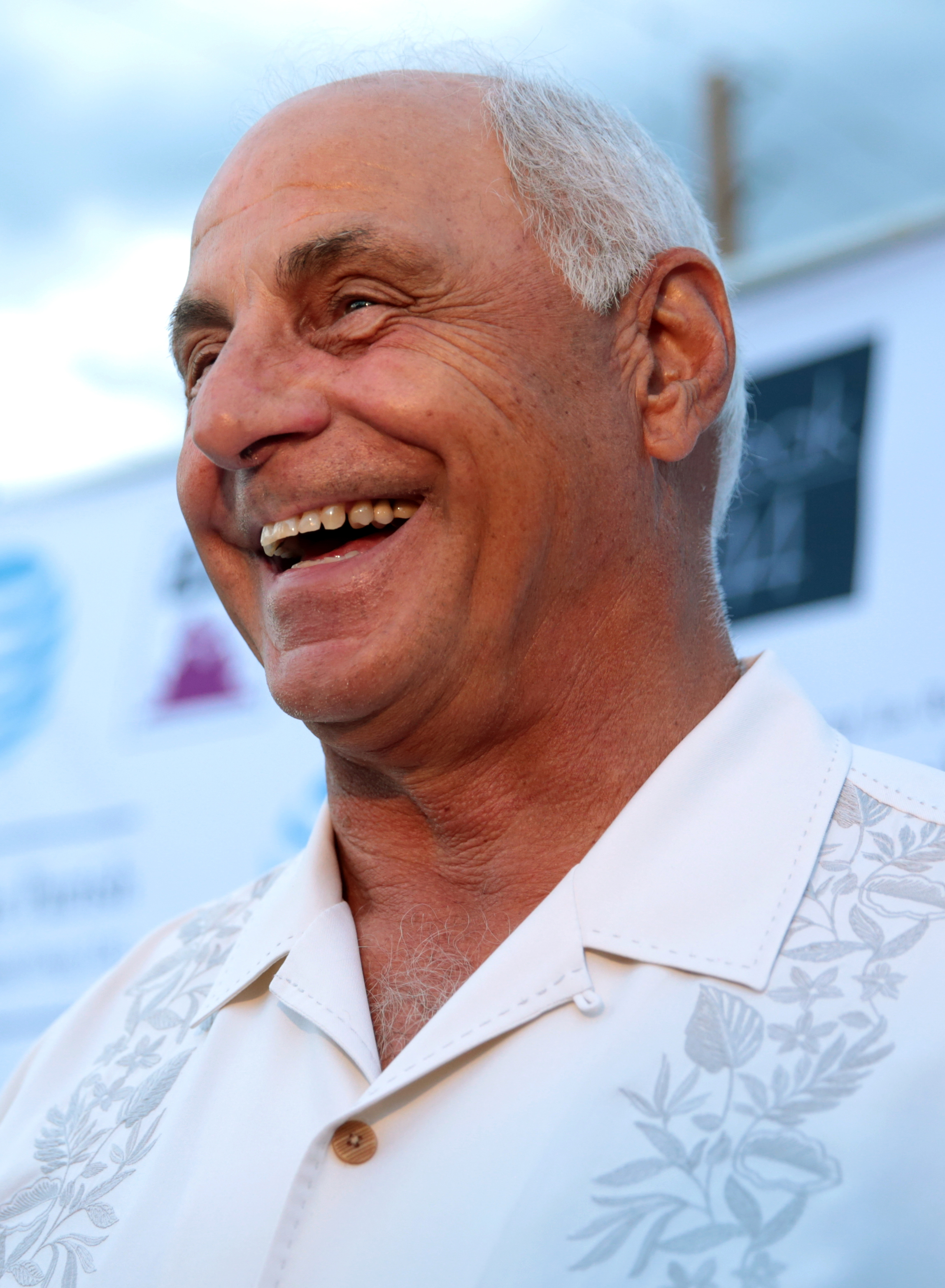
Bando in 2017

Bando was born in Cleveland on February 13, 1944, to Ben, a carpenter, and Angela, a homemaker. He then grew up in nearby Warrensville Heights, Ohio, with younger siblings, Chris and Victoria. Chris was a catcher for the Cleveland Indians.

In 1969 Bando married Sandy Fortunato. The couple had three sons, Salvatore Jr., Sonny and Stefano.

Sal Bando, Jr., was the head baseball coach at High Point University from 2001 to 2008. Since 2010 Bando Jr. has been the head baseball coach at Marquette University High School, leading the team to two straight state championship appearances in his first two seasons there.

Bando was a Roman Catholic and was involved in some Catholic organizations.

=== Death ===
Bando died of cancer on January 20, 2023, in Oconomowoc, Wisconsin, at age 78.

== See also ==
- List of Major League Baseball career home run leaders
- List of Major League Baseball career runs batted in leaders
- List of Major League Baseball annual doubles leaders

Sporting positions
Preceded by Harry Dalton	Milwaukee Brewers general manager 1991–1999	Succeeded by Dean Taylor
