= 2026 Mountain West Conference baseball tournament =

- Teams: 6
- Format: Single-elimination/Double-elimination
- Finals site: Sloan Park; Mesa, Arizona
- Champions: Washington State Cougars (8th title)
- Winning coach: Nathan Choate (1st title)
- MVP: Gavin Roy (Washington State)
- Television: Mountain West Network; Ryz Sports Network (championship)

2026 Mountain West Conference baseball standings
	Conf.						Overall
Team	W		L		T	PCT	W		L		T	PCT
San Diego State ‍†‍‍	16	–	8	–	0	.667	36	–	24	–	0	.600
Washington State ‍‍‡‍^{y}	15	–	9	–	0	.625	31	–	28	–	0	.525
Air Force ‍‍‍	15	–	9	–	0	.625	27	–	28	–	0	.491
Nevada ‍‍‍	13	–	11	–	0	.542	24	–	27	–	0	.471
New Mexico ‍‍‍	12	–	11	–	1	.521	29	–	24	–	1	.546
UNLV ‍‍‍	11	–	13	–	0	.458	30	–	25	–	0	.545
San Jose State ‍‍‍	11	–	13	–	0	.458	24	–	27	–	0	.471
Grand Canyon ‍‍‍	11	–	13	–	0	.458	21	–	30	–	0	.412
Fresno State ‍‍‍	3	–	20	–	1	.146	14	–	38	–	1	.274
† – Conference champion ‡ – Tournament champion y – Invited to the NCAA Tournament; As of May 16, 2026; Rankings from D1Baseball

The 2026 Mountain West Conference baseball tournament was held from May 21st through 24th at Sloan Park in Mesa, Arizona. The top six regular season finishers of the conference's nine teams met in the tournament, with the top 2 teams receiving byes to the double-elimination rounds.

== Seeding and format ==
The top six finishers of the league's nine teams qualify for the conference tournament. Teams are seeded based on conference winning percentage, with the first tiebreaker being head-to-head record.

== Bracket ==
Upper round 1
4	Nevada	4
5	New Mexico	13
3	Air Force	17^{(7)}
6	UNLV	2

Upper round 2
1	San Diego State	11
5	New Mexico	6
2	Washington State	5
3	Air Force	1
Lower round 2
5	New Mexico	1
3	Air Force	11^{(8)}

Upper final
1	San Diego State	9
2	Washington State	14
Lower final
1	San Diego State	11
3	Air Force	8

Final
2	Washington State	2	14
1	San Diego State	9	4

== Schedule ==
Game	Time*	Matchup^{#}	Score	Notes	Reference
Thursday, May 21
1	1:05 pm	No. 3 Air Force vs. No. 6 UNLV	17−2^{(7)}	UNLV Eliminated	
2	6:05 pm	No. 4 Nevada vs. No. 5 New Mexico	4−13	Nevada Eliminated	
Friday, May 22
3	1:05 pm	No. 1 San Diego State vs. No. 5 New Mexico	11-6		
4	6:05 pm	No. 2 Washington State vs. No. 3 Air Force	5-1		
Saturday, May 23
5	9:05 am	No. 5 New Mexico vs. No. 3 Air Force	1-11	New Mexico Eliminated	
6	1:05 pm	No. 1 San Diego State vs. No. 2 Washington State	9-14		
7	6:05 pm	No. 3 Air Force vs. No. 1 San Diego State	8-11	Air Force Eliminated	
Sunday, May 24
8	12:05 pm	No. 1 San Diego State vs. No. 2 Washington State	9-2	Game 9 Forced	
9	3:05 pm	No. 1 San Diego State vs. No. 2 Washington State	4−14^{(7)}	Washington State Wins	

== All–Tournament Team ==
Player	Team
Nick Lewis	Washington State
Luke Meyers	Washington State
**Gavin Roy**	Washington State
Ryan Skjonsby	Washington State
Adam Magpoc	San Diego State
Jake Jackson	San Diego State
Drew Talavs	San Diego State
Ethan Dillinger	Air Force
Luke Elmore	Air Force
Ryan Castillo	New Mexico
Luke Mansy	New Mexico

MVP in bold
