= 2026 Washington State Cougars baseball team =

2026 season of Washington State University baseball team

2026 Washington State Cougars baseball

Mountain West Conference tournament champions

Eugene Regional, 1-2
- Conference: Mountain West Conference
- Record: 31-28 (15-9 MW)
- Head coach: Nathan Choate (3rd season)
- Assistant coaches: Tommy Richards; Eric Hutting; Dan Bower
- Home stadium: Bailey-Brayton Field

2026 Mountain West Conference baseball standings
	Conf.						Overall
Team	W		L		T	PCT	W		L		T	PCT
San Diego State ‍†‍‍	16	–	8	–	0	.667	36	–	24	–	0	.600
Washington State ‍‍‡‍^{y}	15	–	9	–	0	.625	31	–	28	–	0	.525
Air Force ‍‍‍	15	–	9	–	0	.625	27	–	28	–	0	.491
Nevada ‍‍‍	13	–	11	–	0	.542	24	–	27	–	0	.471
New Mexico ‍‍‍	12	–	11	–	1	.521	29	–	24	–	1	.546
UNLV ‍‍‍	11	–	13	–	0	.458	30	–	25	–	0	.545
San Jose State ‍‍‍	11	–	13	–	0	.458	24	–	27	–	0	.471
Grand Canyon ‍‍‍	11	–	13	–	0	.458	21	–	30	–	0	.412
Fresno State ‍‍‍	3	–	20	–	1	.146	14	–	38	–	1	.274
† – Conference champion ‡ – Tournament champion y – Invited to the NCAA Tournament; As of May 16, 2026; Rankings from D1Baseball

The 2026 Washington State Cougars baseball team represented Washington State University during the 2026 NCAA Division I baseball season. The Cougars play their home games at Bailey-Brayton Field. Washington State entered this season seeking to improve upon their last place finish in the Mountain West conference in the prior season.

The Cougars earned a 2-seed in the Mountain West tournament, and won it by beating future Pac-12 rival San Diego State. By securing an automatic bid to the 2026 NCAA Division I baseball tournament, the team broke a 16-year postseason drought. They were seeded third in the Eugene regional alongside former Pac-12 rival Oregon, current Pac-12 rival Oregon State, and Yale. The Cougars beat Oregon State in the first game, and lost to Oregon and Oregon State in their second and third games, respectively.

This season marked the last of Washington State's two-year stint as an affiliate member in the Mountain West conference. They would depart the conference along with full members Fresno State and San Diego State to become charter members of the reformed Pac-12 Conference on July 1, 2026.

== Previous season ==
The Cougars finished 18–36, 11–19 in the Mountain West to finish in last place. The Cougars did not appear in any postseason tournament.

== Personnel ==
=== Roster ===
2026 Washington State Cougars baseball roster
Pitchers: 43 - Gavin Derr - Sophomore; 13 - Nick Lewis - (redshirt) Sophomore; 26 - Owen Harper - Junior; 10 - Taber Fast - (redshirt) Junior; 34 - Brock Blatter - (redshirt) Junior; 41 - Bryce Chambers - Senior; 54 - Rylan Hader - (redshirt) Junior; 32 - Luke Meyers - Senior; 20 - Gabe Schneider - Sophomore; 25 - Griffin Smith - Senior; 42 - Trevor Stowe - (redshirt) Junior; 35 - Kaden Wickersham - (redshirt) Senior; 31 - Ryan Falke - Freshman; 11 - August Richie - Junior; 15 - Scott Rienguette - (redshirt) Junior; 28 - Erik Rodriguez - Junior; 27 - Lleyton Daily - Sophomore; 45 - Austin Sheldon - Graduate; 57 - Dillon O'Neil - Sophomore	Catchers: 44 - Brock Cross - Freshman; 46 - Noah Thein - Senior; 4 - Alexandre Giguère - Freshman; 24 - Cam Macleod - Junior; 39 - Joel Fernandez - Sophomore; Infielders: 19 - Ryan Skjonsby - Senior; 5 - Kyler Northrop - Sophomore; 8 - Ollie Obenour - Sophomore; 2 - Dane Chavez - Freshman; 6 - Gavin Roy - Senior; 1 - Luke Thiele - (redshirt) Senior	Outfielders: 23 - Max Hartman - Senior; 7 - Cole Watterson - (redshirt) Junior; 40 - Joey Hecker - Freshman; 12 - Mason Pirello - Freshman; 3 - Matt Priest - (redshirt) Freshman; 21 - Dustin Robinson - (redshirt) Sophomore; 17 - Trevor Smith - Freshman
