= Jack Wilson (shortstop) =

American baseball player and coach (born 1977)

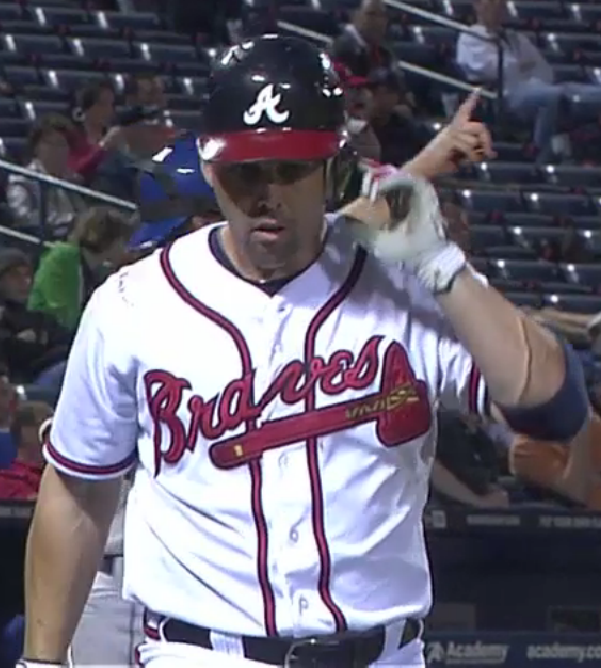
- Wilson with the Atlanta Braves
- Shortstop
- Born: December 29, 1977 (age 48); Westlake Village, California, U.S.
- Batted: Right Threw: Right

MLB debut
- April 3, 2001, for the Pittsburgh Pirates

Last MLB appearance
- July 13, 2012, for the Atlanta Braves

MLB statistics
- Batting average: .265
- Home runs: 61
- Runs batted in: 426
- Stats at Baseball Reference

Teams
- Pittsburgh Pirates (2001–2009); Seattle Mariners (2009–2011); Atlanta Braves (2011–2012)

Career highlights and awards
- All-Star (2004); Silver Slugger Award (2004)

Jack Eugene Wilson (born December 29, 1977) is an American former professional baseball shortstop and current coach. He played in Major League Baseball (MLB) for the Pittsburgh Pirates, Seattle Mariners, and Atlanta Braves. After his playing career, he became a coach and is the manager of the Greeneville Flyboys in the collegiate Appalachian League.

== Early career ==
Wilson played high school baseball for Thousand Oaks High School in Thousand Oaks, California. He later played for two seasons at Oxnard College, the same baseball program that produced major leaguers Terry Pendleton, Josh Towers, and Paul McAnulty. He was coached by Pat Woods, Jon Larsen, Roger Frash, and Buster Staniland.

== Professional career ==
=== Minor leagues ===
The St. Louis Cardinals selected Wilson in the 1998 MLB draft. The Cardinals traded Wilson to the Pittsburgh Pirates in 2000 for Jason Christiansen.

=== Pittsburgh Pirates ===
Wilson made his MLB debut in 2001. He had almost identical seasons in 2002 and 2003, hitting .252 with 22 doubles in 147 games and .256, 21, 150, respectively.

In 2004, Wilson set career highs in almost every category. He posted a .308 average; shared the league lead in triples with 12 (Jimmy Rollins); scored 82 runs; hit 41 doubles and 11 home runs; and collected 49 RBI. His 201 hits were 3rd in the league and included 56 multi-hit games. To cap it off he ended the year with a season-high 12-game hitting streak (17-for-46, .370). After hitting eighth in the batting order for most of his career, he became a fixture in the second slot.

He became just the ninth National League shortstop to collect 200 hits in a season; the franchise's first player since Dave Parker (1977), and the first Pirates shortstop since Hall of Famer Honus Wagner (1908). Wilson also became the first Pirate to collect 10 or more doubles, triples, and home runs in the same season since Andy Van Slyke (1992).

Defensively, Wilson led National League shortstops in assists (492), putouts (234), and total chances (743). His 129 double plays led all major league shortstops and broke the club record of 128 set by Gene Alley in 1966. He went 31 straight contests without making an error. Wilson was named to the 2004 All-Star Game and won the Silver Slugger at shortstop. He was also the Pirates candidate for the Roberto Clemente Award.

==== 2005 season ====
In December 2004, Wilson was hospitalized for an appendectomy. Despite the setback, he was optimistic at spring training 2005. At 6-foot, 175-pound, Wilson had regained six of the 15 pounds he lost. However, he started the season poorly, hitting just .163 in April and .227 for the first half of the season, and acknowledged that he had not been fully recovered when the season started. Late season improvements to his hitting brought his cumulative season numbers to near his career averages, but still well below the standards he had set in 2004. He finished the year with a .257 batting average, a .299 on-base percentage, and a .363 slugging percentage, compared to his career highs of .308, .335, and .459 respectively the year before.

His defense, however, did not seem to suffer. For the second straight year he led all shortstops in the National League (and, in fact, all of baseball) in assists (523), total chances (783), and double plays (126). Largely because of Wilson and fellow defensive standout second baseman José Castillo, the Pirates turned more double plays in 2005 than any National League team save the Cardinals.

==== 2006–2009 ====
Wilson rebounded offensively yet never to the same level as in 2004. Most notably, in 2007, he hit .296 with a career high 12 home runs despite only playing in 135 games. He had frequently been the subject of trade rumors.

=== Seattle Mariners ===
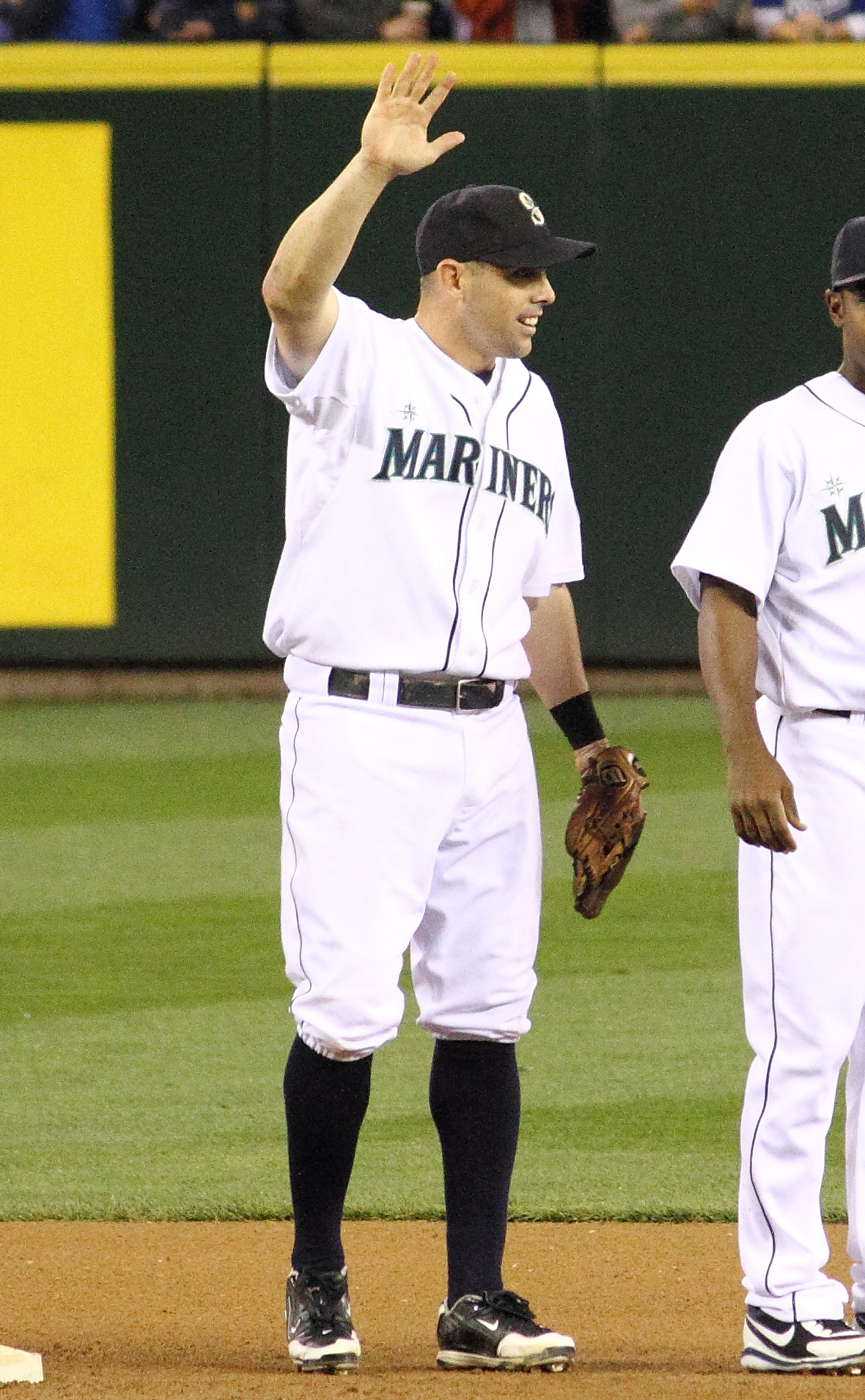
Wilson as a Mariner in 2010.

On July 29, 2009, the Pirates traded Wilson and Ian Snell to the Seattle Mariners for Ronny Cedeño and minor leaguers Jeff Clement, Nate Adcock, Aaron Pribanic, and Brett Lorin. He won a Fielding Bible Award for his defensive excellence at shortstop in 2009.

In November 2009, Jack Wilson re-signed with the Seattle Mariners for two years and $10 million.

=== Atlanta Braves ===
On August 31, 2011, Wilson was traded to the Atlanta Braves for a player to be named later.

On January 13, 2012, the Braves announced they had re-signed him to a 1-year $1 million contract plus 500K bonuses for games played. On August 31, 2012, the Braves released Wilson.

Wilson announced his retirement on September 25, 2012.

== Coaching career ==
Wilson was the head coach at his alma mater, Thousand Oaks High School, from 2017 to 2021 where he went 98–30–1.

He has held several positions coaching amateur players with USA Baseball.

Wilson was the hitting coach for the Mankato MoonDogs for the 2021 season.

Wilson was named an assistant coach at Grand Canyon University on July 10, 2022, under new head coach Gregg Wallis. Wilson stepped down from the role on June 30, 2023.

Wilson was named the head coach of Greeneville Flyboys for the 2024 season and returned to the Appalachian League team in 2025.

== Personal ==
Jack married his wife Julie in 1999. They have three children. Their son Jacob plays in MLB for the Athletics.

Wilson graduated from Grand Canyon University with a Bachelor of Science in Sports Management in 2018.

== See also ==
- List of Major League Baseball annual triples leaders
