= Nathan Bannister =

American baseball coach and former pitcher

Biographical details
- Born: December 17, 1993 (age 32); Phoenix, Arizona, U.S.
- Education: Arizona

Playing career
- 2013–2016: Arizona
- 2016–2018: Seattle Mariners organization
- Position: Pitcher

Coaching career (HC unless noted)
- 2019–2022: Seattle Mariners organization
- 2022–2026: Grand Canyon (pitching)
- 2026: Grand Canyon (interim HC/pitching)

Accomplishments and honors

Championships
- 2× WAC regular season (2023, 2024)

Nathan Bannister (born December 17, 1993) is an American baseball coach and former professional pitcher who was the interim head coach and pitching coach for the Grand Canyon Antelopes. He played college baseball at Arizona from 2013 to 2016 and professionally in the Seattle Mariners organization from 2016 to 2018 before beginning a coaching career.

== Early life and high school career ==
Bannister was born in Phoenix, Arizona, and attended Liberty High School in Peoria, Arizona. As a senior in 2012, he was named The Arizona Republic Big Schools Player of the Year and was recognized on the USA Today All-USA Baseball Second Team. He finished his senior season with 104 strikeouts in 74 2/3 innings and a 1.88 earned run average while also playing third base and hitting .454 with 35 runs batted in. Bannister threw a perfect game against Copper Canyon in May of his senior year and helped Liberty win a state championship in 2010.

== College career ==
Bannister pitched for Arizona from 2013 to 2016. He compiled a 19–7 record with a 3.22 ERA in 245 2/3 career innings over 61 appearances and 27 starts. As a senior in 2016, Bannister went 12–2 with a 2.59 ERA in 142 1/3 innings and helped lead the Wildcats to the College World Series.

== Professional career ==
The Seattle Mariners selected Bannister in the 28th round of the 2016 Major League Baseball draft, with the 837th overall pick. He made his professional debut in 2017 and reached Triple-A Tacoma during his first professional season. Bannister pitched two seasons in the Mariners organization, appearing in 54 games and making 50 starts while posting a 16–16 record, 5.17 ERA and 204 strikeouts in 285 2/3 innings. He was released by the organization on March 24, 2019.

== Coaching career ==
After the end of his playing career, Bannister remained in the Mariners organization as a pitching coach from 2019 to 2022. He was most recently the pitching coach for the Modesto Nuts before joining Grand Canyon's staff in July 2022, when hired by new Lopes head coach Gregg Wallis.

In Bannister's first two seasons as Grand Canyon's pitching coach, the Lopes won Western Athletic Conference regular-season championships in 2023 and 2024. During the 2024 season, Grand Canyon won its first NCAA Division I baseball tournament game by defeating Bannister's alma mater, Arizona, 9–4 in the Tucson Regional. The Lopes later defeated Dallas Baptist 12–10 to advance to the program's first regional final.

Grand Canyon named Bannister interim head coach on March 27, 2026, following a midseason leadership change. The Lopes finished the 2026 season with a 13-12 mark under Bannister.

== Head coaching record ==
Record table
Season	Team	Overall	Conference	Standing	Postseason
Grand Canyon Antelopes (Mountain West Conference) (2026)
2026	Grand Canyon	13–12	11–10	T–6th	
Total:		13–12			
National champion Postseason invitational champion Conference regular season champion Conference regular season and conference tournament champion Division regular season champion Division regular season and conference tournament champion Conference tournament champion
