= Andy Stankiewicz =

American baseball player and coach (born 1965)

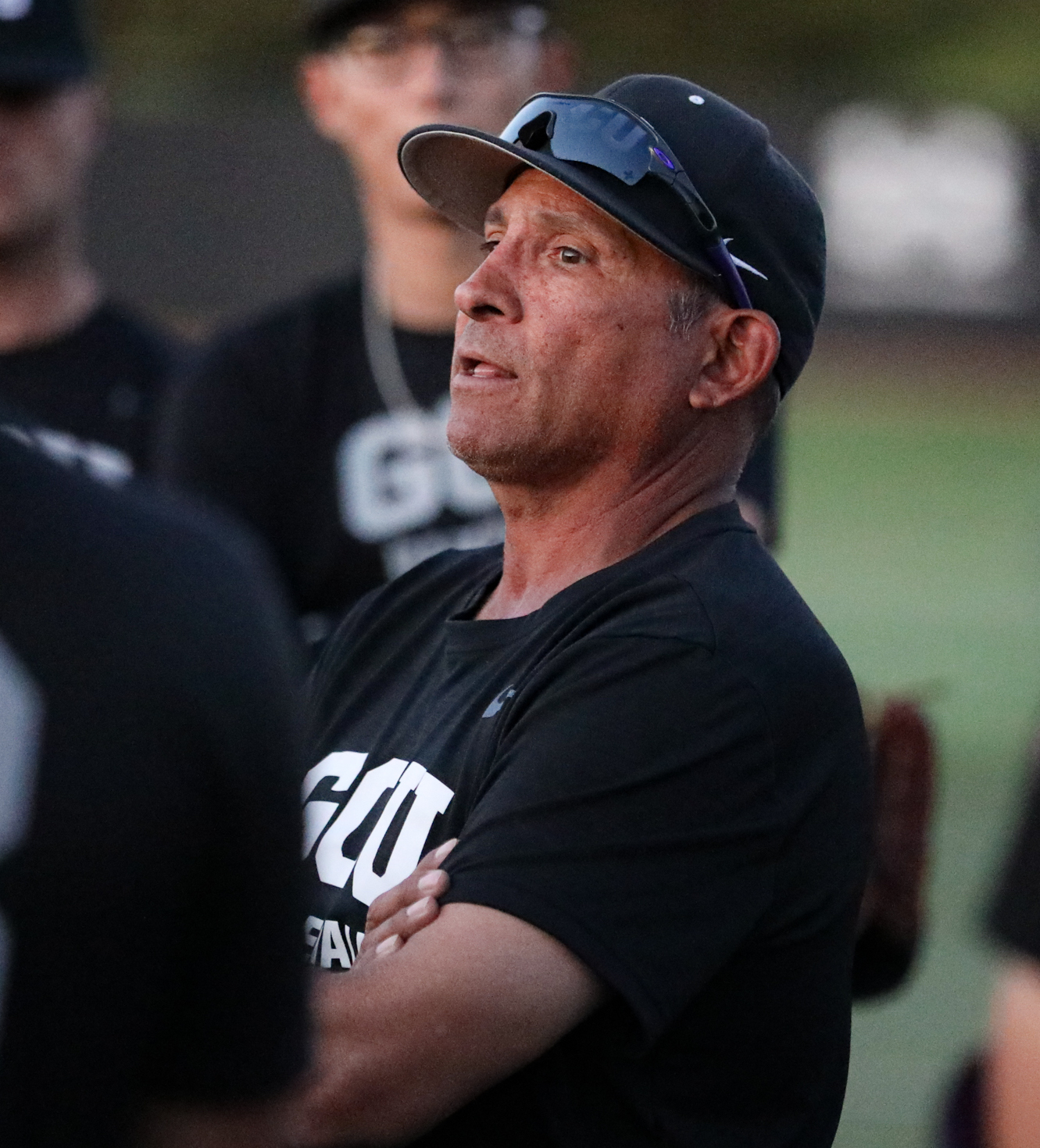
- Stankiewicz speaks to his GCU team in 2022
- Born: Andrew Neal Stankiewicz; August 10, 1964 (age 62); Inglewood, California, U.S.
- Education: Pepperdine University
- Baseball career
- Infielder
- Batted: Right Threw: Right

MLB debut
- April 11, 1992, for the New York Yankees

Last MLB appearance
- September 23, 1998, for the Arizona Diamondbacks

MLB statistics
- Batting average: .241
- Home runs: 4
- Runs batted in: 59
- Stats at Baseball Reference

Teams
- New York Yankees (1992–1993); Houston Astros (1994–1995); Montreal Expos (1996–1997); Arizona Diamondbacks (1998)
Medals
Representing United States
Men's baseball
Pan American Championship
Bronze medal – third place	1985 Caracas	Team
- Coaching career

Current position
- Title: Head coach
- Team: USC
- Conference: Big Ten
- Record: 147–92–1 (.615)

Coaching career (HC unless noted)
- 2004–2005: Staten Island Yankees
- 2006–2009: Arizona State (AC)
- 2012–2022: Grand Canyon
- 2023–present: USC

Head coaching record
- Overall: 488–331–3 (.595)
- Tournaments: NCAA: 3–9–0 (.250)

Accomplishments and honors

Championships
- 5× WAC regular season (2015, 2017, 2018, 2021, 2022); WAC West Division (2022); WAC tournament (2021); NCAA Regional (2026)

Awards
- 4× WAC Coach of the Year (2017, 2018, 2021, 2022); Rod Dedeaux USA Baseball Coach of the Year (2014)

Andrew Neal Stankiewicz (born August 10, 1964) is an American former professional baseball player who currently serves as the head coach of the USC Trojans baseball team in Los Angeles. He also played in Major League Baseball as a middle-infielder.

Stankiewicz had a seven-year MLB playing career spanning four clubs and 429 appearances. He was drafted by the New York Yankees in the 1986 draft and went on to make his MLB debut with the club in 1992. He also played for the Houston Astros and Montreal Expos before closing out his career with the Arizona Diamondbacks during their inaugural season in 1998.

Following his playing career, Stankiewicz worked in the Yankees organization including serving as the manager of the Staten Island Yankees in 2003 and 2005, a roving infield instructor in 2004, and as a scout in 2006. He led Staten Island, the Yankees' Class A affiliate, to the 2005 NY-Penn League Championship.

He got his first taste of college coaching with a three-year stint as an assistant coach at Arizona State under Pat Murphy, making a pair of College World Series appearances in 2007 and 2009.

Stankiewicz also served as the minor league field coordinator for the Seattle Mariners from 2009 to 2012 before taking the head coaching job at Grand Canyon.

In an 11-year stint as the head coach at Grand Canyon, he inherited an NCAA Division II program and guided it through a transition to Division I where it stood as one of the nation's top mid-major programs with five Western Athletic Conference regular-season championships and multiple appearances in the nation's top-25 rankings.

Stankiewicz went to St. Paul High School in Santa Fe Springs, California. He is an alumnus of Pepperdine University, where he was a standout for the Waves baseball program and graduated in 1986 with a degree in sociology. He ranks in the top 10 in several Pepperdine career batting categories, and is third on the school's all-time list in stolen bases (101).

== Playing career ==
=== High school ===
Stankiewicz was an all-league player and his team's most valuable player in football, basketball and baseball at St. Paul High School in Southern California. He was "regarded as 'one of the best athletes in the history of the school.' His credentials were impressive, not in one sport, but three."

He hit .438 and was the Swordsmen's everyday shortstop as a senior in 1982.

Stankiewicz also played football where he was a Los Angeles Times First Team All-Southeast wide receiver as a senior in 1981, catching 53 passes and returning four kicks for touchdowns. His coach classified him as "the fastest player in the league." He played in the state's Shrine All-Star Football classic at the Rose Bowl in July 1982. Stankiewicz received football interest from Northern Arizona.

=== College ===
In July 1982, Stankiewicz received a full baseball scholarship to Pepperdine. He originally held partial scholarship offers from Pepperdine and UC Irvine but signed with the Waves when head coach Dave Gorrie upped his offer to a full scholarship.

Stankiewicz appeared in 32 games as a freshman in 1983, hitting .208 with five RBIs. He became an everyday starter as a sophomore in 1984, playing all but two games in his final three seasons combined. His loudest offensive numbers came as a sophomore, hitting .306 with a team-leading 11 home runs, a team-best 63 runs scored and 74 hits. He rounded out his career hitting .278 as a junior and .288 as a senior. For his career, he played in 221 games, recorded 215 hits, 20 home runs, 172 runs scored, 96 RBIs and a .285 batting average.

Stankiewicz wore No. 3 as a Wave and earned second-team all-conference honors as a sophomore and a senior.

The Waves qualified for the NCAA tournament in his junior and senior seasons. In the 1985 Stanford Regional, Pepperdine lost its opener to Nebraska before bouncing back to win three straight games against Oregon State, Nebraska and Stanford. The Waves fell in the winner-take-all regional championship to Stanford. In the 1986 Austin Regional, Pepperdine won games against Texas–Pan American and Southern Illinois before losing to Arizona. The Waves staved off elimination by beating host Texas but fell again to Arizona. Stankiewicz finished 6–4 in the NCAA tournament in his Waves career.

Stankiewicz remains in Pepperdine's career top 10 for at bats with 755, runs with 172, walks drawn with 121, stolen bases with 101 and stolen-base percentage at .828.

While at Pepperdine, Stankiewicz played alongside other future MLB players in Paul Faries, Mike Fetters, Matt Howard, Chad Kreuter and Doug Simons as well as current Pepperdine head coach Rick Hirtensteiner.

Alongside his brother, Alan, Stankiewicz played collegiate summer ball in 1985 for the North Pole Nicks under legendary coach Mike Gillespie. Both Andy and Alan earned National Baseball Congress All-American honors.

=== MLB draft ===
Stankiewicz was selected in three MLB drafts.

- 1982: 26th round by the Kansas City Royals out of high school.
- 1985: 18th round by the Detroit Tigers after junior year of college.
- 1986: 12th round by the New York Yankees after senior year of college.

=== Minor leagues ===
In 11 seasons in the minor leagues, he played primarily shortstop and second base. In 1987 he hit .307 at Ft. Lauderdale, and in 1989 he stole 41 bases in 498 at bats at Albany.

=== Major leagues ===
Stankiewicz played for four different ballclubs during his career: the New York Yankees (1992–1993), Houston Astros (1994–1995), Montreal Expos (1996–1997), and Arizona Diamondbacks (1998).

He made his Major League Baseball debut on April 11, 1992, and played his final game on September 23, 1998.

He was a 27-year-old rookie in 1992, when he hit .268 for the Yankees, and .304 with runners in scoring position, and set what turned out to be career highs in at bats (400), runs (52), home runs (2), RBIs (25), and stolen bases (9).

== Coaching career ==
Following his playing career, he managed the Staten Island Yankees, New York's single-A (short season) affiliate, for two seasons (2004–2005), which culminated with a New York–Penn League title in 2005. In 2006, he worked as a scout for the New York Yankees. From 2006 to 2009 he was an assistant baseball coach at Arizona State University. Under his guidance, ASU led the nation in fielding percentage in 2007, and he coached 29 players who were drafted, including three first rounders.

=== Grand Canyon ===
On April 25, 2011, Stankiewicz became the head coach at Grand Canyon University.

In his first season, he guided the Antelopes to a 27–23 overall record as the squad finished eighth in the final West Region poll. Stankiewicz also had been selected as an assistant coach for USA Baseball's Collegiate National Team during the summer of 2012. The squad traveled to Cuba and The Netherlands to compete in Honkbal-Haarlem Baseball Week, where they won the bronze medal. In just his second season at Grand Canyon, Stankiewicz had the program winning 40 games and advancing to the NCAA Division II Baseball Championship.

Stankiewicz continued to lead the Lopes as they transitioned from Division II to Division I beginning in 2014. In 2015, under his direction, Grand Canyon won the 2015 regular season WAC title.

Stankiewicz quickly built Grand Canyon into one of the WAC's top two programs, winning regular-season championships in 2015, 2017 and 2018. In 2017 and 2018, the Lopes did not lose a WAC series and posted 19–5 and 20–4 records.

He continued the program's upward trajectory into the 2020s, winning additional WAC regular-season championships in 2021 and 2022. Stankiewicz took the program to its first NCAA Division I baseball tournament in 2021 with a WAC baseball tournament championship. In 2022, the program made its debut in the D1Baseball.com top-25 poll for the first time and remained for three weeks through the end of the regular season. The Lopes earned an at-large bid into the 2022 NCAA Division I baseball tournament as one of the last four teams in.

=== USC ===
Stankiewicz was named head baseball coach at the University of Southern California on July 3, 2022.

His first season was considered a surprising success, winning 34 games and posting a 26–6 record at home. The Trojans finished fourth in the Pac-12 standings by winning seven of their 10 conference series but were left out of the NCAA tournament despite being projected as safely in by many publications.

== Head coaching record ==
Record table
Season	Team	Overall	Conference	Standing	Postseason
Grand Canyon Antelopes (Pacific West Conference) (2012–2013)
2012	Grand Canyon	27–23	23–17	3rd	
2013	Grand Canyon	40–19	26–10	2nd	
Grand Canyon:			49–27		
Grand Canyon Antelopes (Western Athletic Conference) (2014–2022)
2014	Grand Canyon	30–23	19–8	2nd	
2015	Grand Canyon	32–22	19–7	2nd	
2016	Grand Canyon	25–28–1	13–14	5th	
2017	Grand Canyon	29–25	20–4	1st	
2018	Grand Canyon	33–24	19–5	1st	WAC tournament
2019	Grand Canyon	36–24	18–9	T-4th	WAC tournament
2020	Grand Canyon	9–9	0–0		Season canceled due to COVID-19
2021	Grand Canyon	39–21–1	29–7	T-1st	NCAA Regional
2022	Grand Canyon	41–21	25–5	1st (West)	NCAA Regional
Grand Canyon:		341–239–2	162–59		
USC Trojans (Pac-12 Conference) (2023–2024)
2023	USC	34–23–1	17–13	4th	Pac-12 Tournament
2024	USC	31–28	17–12	4th	Pac-12 Tournament
USC:		– (–)	34–25–0 (.576)		
USC Trojans (Big Ten Conference) (2025–present)
2025	USC	37–23	18–12	4th	NCAA Regional
2026	USC	48–18	20–10	T–3rd	NCAA Super Regional
USC:		147–92–1 (.615)			
Total:		488–331–3 (.595)			
National champion Postseason invitational champion Conference regular season champion Conference regular season and conference tournament champion Division regular season champion Division regular season and conference tournament champion Conference tournament champion

== Coaching tree ==
- Nathan Choate served as GCU's pitching coach (2012–16) before moving to San Diego to be its pitching coach (2017–18) and Loyola Marymount to be its pitching coach (2019) then head coach (2020-present).
- Rich Dorman served as GCU's pitching coach (2017–19) before moving to Oregon State to be its pitching coach (2020–present).
- Marc Mumper played at GCU (2016–19) before earning a role on the Abilene Christian staff (2020–21), moving to Air Force (2022) and then the Cleveland Guardians organization (2022–present).
- Gregg Wallis was an assistant at GCU (2014–22) before temporarily moving to Ohio State (2022) and then taking over for Stankiewicz as head coach at Grand Canyon (2022–present).
- Ryan Cisterna was a volunteer assistant at GCU (2012–17) before moving to CSU Bakersfield (2018–20).
- Joe Perez served as a graduate assistant at GCU (2013–16) before moving to Central Arizona College (2017–present) where he is now the associate head coach and recruiting coordinator.

== Personal ==
Stankiewicz married his wife Mari Ana in 1992. The couple has four children: Drew, Marisa, Dane and Mia. Drew played baseball at Arizona State and was drafted in the 11th round of the 2014 MLB draft by the Philadelphia Phillies. Marisa played softball at Arizona State, Dane played baseball for Andy at Grand Canyon, and Mia played softball at South Mountain Community College and CSUN.

He grew up in Inglewood, California, the son of Al and Hope Stankiewicz. He has an older brother, Alan, and a younger sister, Andrea.

== See also ==
- List of current NCAA Division I baseball coaches
