= Brazell Field at GCU Ballpark =

Baseball stadium at Grand Canyon University

Brazell Field

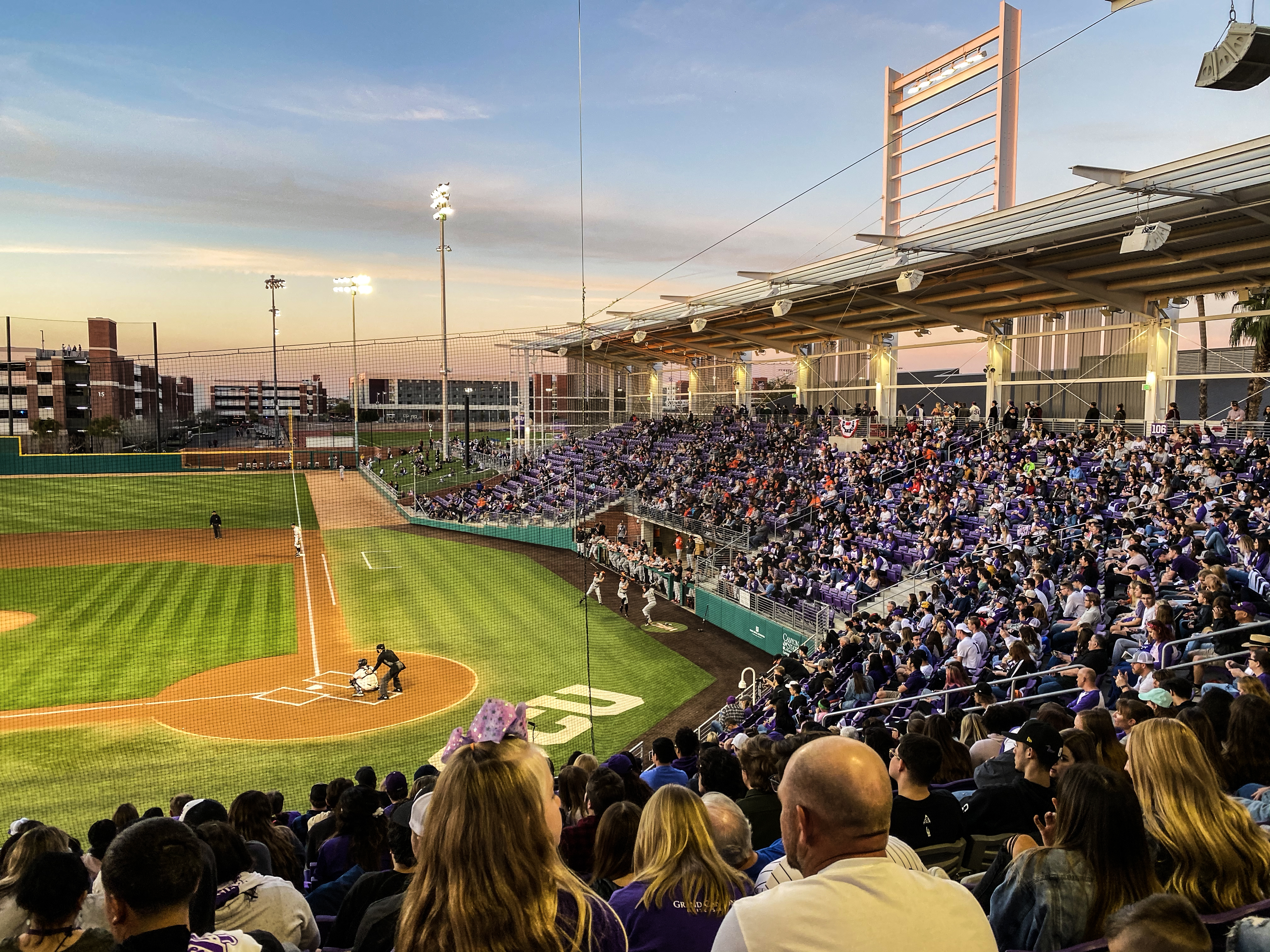
- Interactive map of Brazell Field
- Full name: Brazell Field at GCU Ballpark
- Former names: Brazell Stadium
- Address: United States
- Location: 3300 W Camelback Road; Grand Canyon University; Phoenix, Arizona, 85017 U.S.
- Coordinates: 33.5119°N 112.1327°W
- Operator: Grand Canyon University
- Capacity: 4,000
- Type: Ballpark
- Surface: Foul Territory; AstroTurf (2018–present); Infield/Outfield; Natural Grass (1962–present)
- Scoreboard: Left Field Wall
- Field size: Left: 320 ft (98 m); L. Center: 390 ft (120 m); Center: 385 ft (117 m); R. Center: 375 ft (114 m); Right: 330 ft (101 m)
- Current use: Baseball

Construction
- Groundbreaking: May 22, 2017
- Built: 2018
- Opened: 1962; 64 years ago (Note: The date refers to the field. The full stadium was completed in 2018.)
- Renovated: 1985, 2018
- Architect: suoLL Architects
- General contractor: Pono Construction LLC

Tenants
- Grand Canyon Antelopes (NCAA); Grand Canyon Rafters (AFL) (1992)

Website
- gculopes.com/brazell-field

Brazell Field at GCU Ballpark is a college baseball stadium on the campus of Grand Canyon University in Phoenix, Arizona. It hosts the Grand Canyon Antelopes of the Mountain West Conference.

The field is named for Dr. Dave Brazell, considered to be "the founder and developer of Canyon baseball." As the coach of the Lopes for 28 seasons, Brazell put together a record of 728–385–8.

The playing surface is composed complete of natural grass, save for infield foul territory where AstroTurf was installed in 2018. An inning-by-inning digital scoreboard is visible in left-center field.

== History ==
=== Field established ===
In 1962, the program's facility was relocated from a more centralized location on the campus to the west end with the left field fence running parallel to 35th Avenue. The layout of the field remains largely unchanged from its 1962 debut.

In 1970, the field was named Brazell Field, after the program's first coach, Dave Brazell, who had designed the field in 1961.

=== Brazell Stadium era ===
With the addition of bleacher seating, the facility transitioned from Brazell Field to Brazell Stadium in 1987.

Gold-colored bleachers wrapped around the home plate area, extending to each team's dugouts on either side. The stadium featured lights, making night games possible.

In the off-season prior to the 2014 baseball season, large shades were added over the stands. The official capacity for the venue was 1,500.

Improvements over the years at Brazell Stadium included replacement of wood bleachers, backstop improvements and the awning.

On February 21, 2014, the Grand Canyon Antelopes baseball team hosted the inaugural game in which the Lopes were a full member of the Western Athletic Conference. The Lopes defeated the Hofstra Pride 8–1 behind a complete game from starting pitcher Jorge Perez.

After spending four seasons in Division I for baseball only from 1995 to 1998, the entire athletic department made the jump to NCAA Division I for the fall of 2013. Since the return to Division I for the baseball program, the Lopes boasted a 35–13 record at Brazell Stadium through the 2015 season.

=== Birth of GCU Ballpark ===
In August 2016, the university announced its 10-in-2 initiative to build 10 new athletic facilities in two years to coincide with the final stages of GCU's full Division I membership. Among these 10 facilities was a new baseball stadium, later named GCU Ballpark. The new name of the facility was announced as Brazell Field at GCU Ballpark on January 22, 2018.

Demolition of the former stadium including the press box, grandstands, and dugouts began on May 22, 2017, following the conclusion of the home portion of the team's schedule.

The new facility delivers several new amenities for the program: chairback seating for over 3,000 fans, a multi-room press box, an upgraded sound system, an entertainment patio in right field, berm seating for fans in right field, an on-site concession stand and a team store.

=== Into the 2020s ===
The ballpark got a new video board in right-center field in May 2022.

Brazell Field at GCU Ballpark hosted its first national television broadcast on February 18, 2023, when MLB Network televised Grand Canyon's home opener against No. 2 Tennessee as part of the MLB Desert Invitational. Stephen Nelson, Rubén Amaro Jr. and Jim Callis were on the call. The Lopes defeated the Volunteers 4–3 in front of 4,457 fans.

== Gallery ==
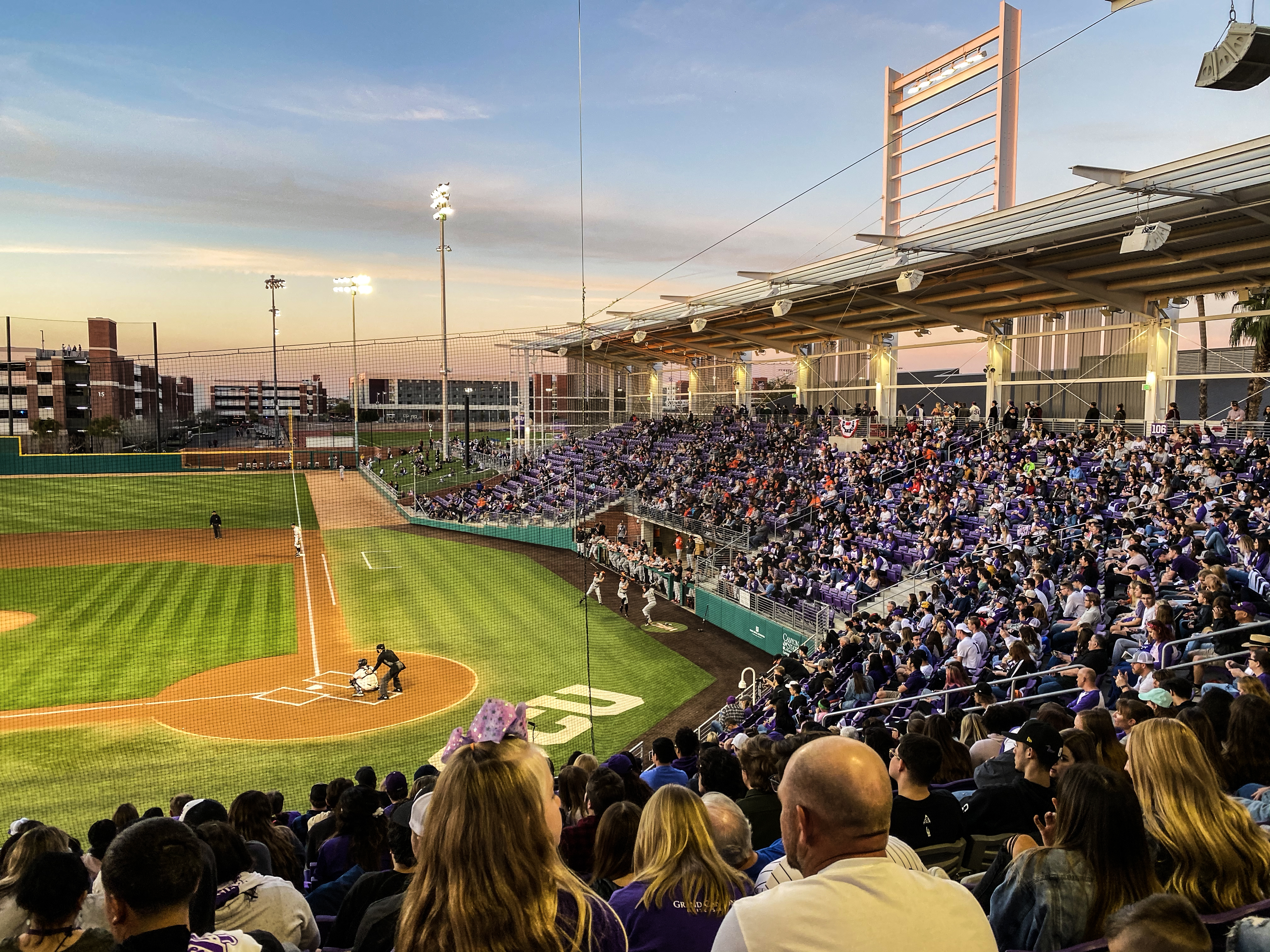

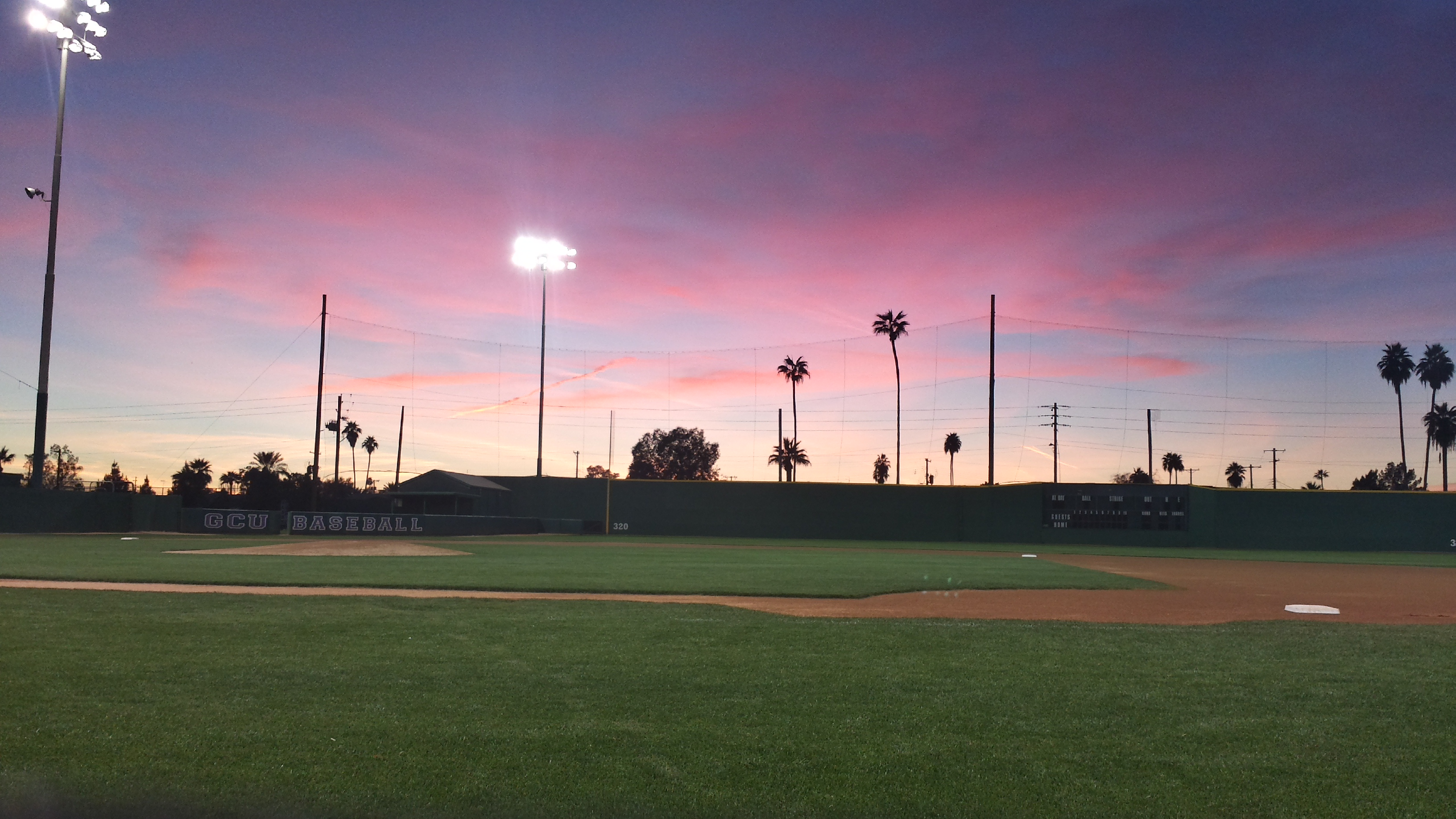

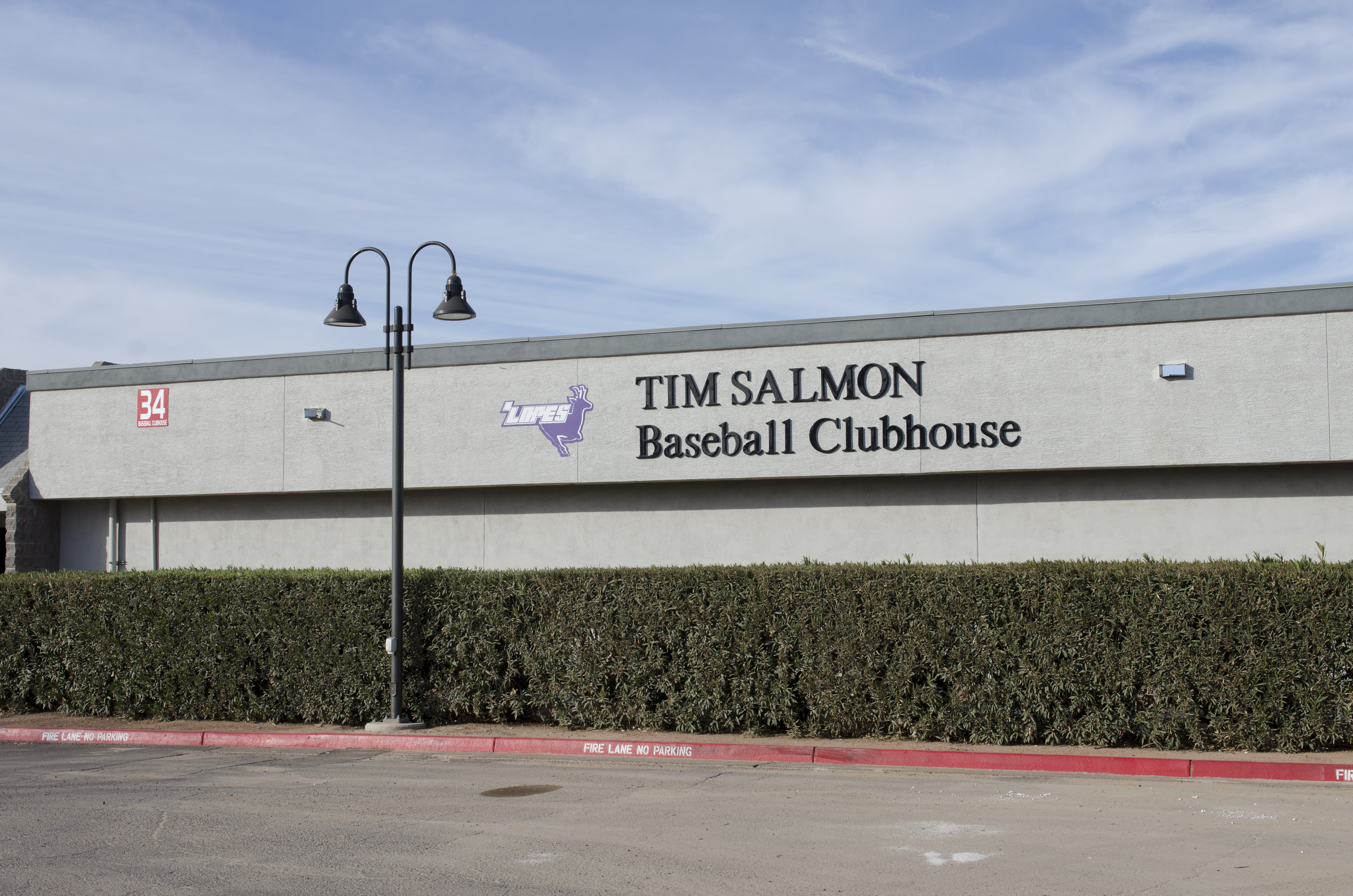

== See also ==
- List of NCAA Division I baseball venues
