= Donnie Marbut =

American baseball coach

Biographical details
- Born: February 18, 1974 (age 52); Aberdeen, Washington, U.S.
- Education: Portland State, 1997; Edmonds CC, 1995

Playing career
- 1993–1995: Edmonds CC
- 1996–1997: Portland State
- Position: Infielder

Coaching career (HC unless noted)
- 1998: Capital HS (WA) (asst.)
- 1999: Bellevue CC (asst.)
- 2000–2003: Edmonds CC
- 2004: Washington State (asst.)
- 2005–2015: Washington State

Head coaching record
- Overall: 314–304 (.508)
- Tournaments: NCAA: 4–4

Donnie Marbut (born February 18, 1974) is an American college baseball coach, formerly the head coach at Washington State University in Pullman for eleven seasons, from 2005 through 2015.

== Early life ==
Born and raised in Aberdeen, Washington, Marbut was a three-sport letterman at Aberdeen High School in baseball, basketball, and football. He earned all-league honors three times each in baseball and football and once in basketball. After graduation in 1992, he attended Edmonds Community College, where he played baseball for coach Bill Stubbs. At Edmonds, Marbut was a two-time All-Conference infielder, and was named most valuable player of his team in 1995. After earning an associate's degree, he transferred to Portland State University, where he continued his baseball career as an outstanding hitter for the Vikings.

== Career ==
=== Coaching ===
Marbut began his coaching career back in Washington in 1998 as an assistant at Capital High School in Olympia, where he helped guide the Cougars to the state 3A championship. He then was an assistant at Bellevue Community College, which captured a conference championship in 1999. Following that season, Marbut returned to Edmonds Community College as head coach for four seasons and earned conference coach of the year honors twice and division coach of the year three times. His record at Edmonds was 152–38 (.800), including a league record 43 wins in 2003. Marbut came under fire when a Seattle Times article stated Marbut padded his academic resume while at Edmonds CC, and Washington State, where he coached when the article came out, came out strongly in his defense.

Prior to the 2004 season, Marbut became an assistant at Washington State under fourth-year head coach Tim Mooney, where his work with infielders led to a then-school record .971671 fielding percentage and the first winning record for the Cougars since 1998. Following just one season as an assistant, Marbut became head coach at WSU after Mooney's forced resignation in late May 2004. At the time, he was the youngest head coach in the Pacific-10 Conference, at 30 years old. With Marbut as head coach, Washington State won more than 300 games, produced 23 major league draft picks, and dramatically improved a disastrous Academic Progress Rate score.

Following WSU's consecutive post-season appearances in 2009 and 2010, when the Cougars finished second and third in the Pac-10 respectively, Marbut believed the time was right for Washington State to invest in baseball facilities to compete long-term with other programs in the Pacific-10 Conference and around the Pacific Northwest and he personally raised approximately $3 million in pledges to build a state of the art clubhouse; construction on the $10 million facility begins in 2019. Following the 2010 season, Washington State Athletic Director Bill Moos extended Marbut's contract, stating "During his tenure as WSU’s head coach the program has improved each year on the field and in the classroom. He has embraced the Cougars’ storied history by reconnecting with former players and bringing them back into the program while his vision and passion for the future cannot be matched. We have one of the best coaches in the country and this contract reflects the University's commitment and belief that continued success is on the horizon.”

=== Post-coaching ===
On February 17, 2016, Marbut joined the Pac-12 Network as a baseball analyst, while also serving as a scout for the Houston Astros. On March 31, 2016, Marbut became the President of the West Coast League. As of May 2026, Marbut was a long-time area scout in the Pacific Northwest for the St. Louis Cardinals.

== Head coaching record ==
Record table
Season	Team	Overall	Conference	Standing	Postseason
Washington State Cougars (Pac-10 / Pac-12) (2005–2015)
2005	Washington State	21–37	1–23	9th	
2006	Washington State	36–23	10–14	8th	
2007	Washington State	28–26	10–14	t-6th	
2008	Washington State	30–26	8–16	9th	
2009	Washington State	32–25	19–8	2nd	NCAA Regional
2010	Washington State	37–22	15–12	3rd	NCAA Regional
2011	Washington State	26–28	10–17	9th	
2012	Washington State	28–28	12–18	t-8th	
2013	Washington State	23–32	9–21	10th	
2014	Washington State	24–29	14–16	7th	
2015	Washington State	29–27	11–19	9th	
Washington State:		314–304	119–178		
Total:		314–304			
National champion Postseason invitational champion Conference regular season champion Conference regular season and conference tournament champion Division regular season champion Division regular season and conference tournament champion Conference tournament champion
