= Edmonds College =

Community college in Lynnwood, Washington, US

Coordinates: 47°48′57″N 122°19′40″W

- Type: Public community college
- Established: 1967; 59 years ago
- Accreditation: NWCCU
- President: Amit B. Singh
- Faculty: 126 full, 283 part-time
- Students: 10,320 average per quarter
- Location: Lynnwood, Washington, United States
- Campus: 50 acres (200,000 m^{2})
- Mascot: Triton
- Website: edmonds.edu

Edmonds College, formerly Edmonds Community College, is a public community college in Lynnwood, Washington. More than 17,000 students annually take courses for credit toward a certificate or degree at the college. The college employs more than 1,300 people, including 126 full-time and 283 part-time instructors and 267 students.

== History ==
In 1967, the state legislature separated community colleges from the common schools and created 22 community college districts, including District 5 for Everett and Edmonds Community Colleges. Governor Daniel J. Evans in May 1967 appointed a five-member board of trustees for District 5 to administer the operations of the already existing Everett Junior College and the new Edmonds Community College. In June 1967, the trustees established a district administrative structure with Paul McCurley, President of Everett CC, as the district president and district offices were located at Paine Field in 1968. On July 1, 2013, the governor appointed the college's first student trustee, John Jessop, to a one-year term.

Byron Norman was named acting president of the college on July 5, 1967. Other presidents of the college in succeeding years have been Carleton Opgaard (1968–69, 1995–96), James Warren, Thomas Nielsen, Jack Oharah (1996-2010), Jean Hernandez (2011-2017), and Amit B. Singh (June 2018-). The college's board of trustees removed Nielsen as president on May 23, 1995, after he was accused of accepting kickbacks and bribes; he accepted a $49,700 contract buyout on November 1, 1995, and later pleaded guilty to bribery and income-tax fraud, receiving a two-year prison sentence.

Formal dedication ceremonies were held September 7, 1967, with Senator Henry M. Jackson as the featured speaker.

The college is located on 50 acres (200,000 m^{2}) in Lynnwood, the site of a former military installation, the Northwest Relay and Radio Receiving Station, U.S. Army. The property was declared surplus by the U.S. Secretary of Health, Education and Welfare and transferred to Edmonds Community College on December 6, 1967. Other parts of the originally 100-acre (0.40 km^{2}) site were transferred to the Edmonds School District, the U.S. Post Office and Snohomish County.

Classes began in the fall of 1967 in leased space at Woodway High School in Edmonds (now Scriber Lake High School), an explanation for why the college is named "Edmonds" (despite its Lynnwood address). The college moved to its current Lynnwood campus in 1970. The campus consisted of Mountlake Terrace Hall and two duplex buildings built in 1941 as part of the old Army Relay Station (these were demolished in the late 2010s). A plaque at the northeast entrance to Alderwood Hall on the college campus commemorates the former site of the Globe Wireless Radio Station. It was dedicated by the Edmonds–South Snohomish County Historical Society. The radio station was built in 1930 and operated by the U.S. Army and the Alaska Communication System to provide service to Alaska during World War II.

The college's first buildings, the duplexes, were called "A" and "B" until the college began a tradition of naming buildings after local areas. What is now known as Mountlake Terrace Hall was the first building constructed for the college campus in 1970. The building was renovated in 2006. The college's student newspaper, The Triton Review, was originally called The Quagmire (due to the muddy campus during the early days of the college). The first graduate of Edmonds Community College was Susan Blackborn, 19, the class of 1968 (she was the only graduate that year). Don Wick was the first elected student-body president at Edmonds Community College. He was named a Distinguished Alumnus of the college by the Edmonds Community College Foundation in 2002 and became the executive director of the Economic Development Association of Skagit County.

Edmonds College has partnered with Central Washington University to provide bachelor's degrees locally since 1975. Accounting and business administration were the first programs offered at the Lynnwood Center. CWU-Lynnwood now offers eight bachelor's degrees and one master's program. The opening of Snoqualmie Hall in 2002 provided Central a permanent presence on campus.

The college's name was shortened to Edmonds College in April 2020 to reflect the availability of four-year degree programs.

== Governance ==
The college is governed by the Washington State Board of Community and Technical Colleges. It is accredited by the Northwest Commission on Colleges and Universities. The Board of Trustees of Edmonds Community College was composed of five members appointed by the governor of Washington, until July 1, 2013, when a sixth member representing students was appointed by the governor. Each member serves a five-year term, except the student representative, who serves a one-year term, and all must reside within the college's district boundaries.

== Campus ==
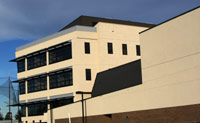
Mukilteo Hall with classrooms and a theater opened in 2008.

The college has a 50-acre (20-hectare) campus in Lynnwood, 13 miles (21 km) north of Seattle and adjacent to Edmonds.

The campus includes 28 computer labs, nine science labs, three eateries, two greenhouses, a digital recording studio, an art gallery, a theater, a child care center, Seaview gym, Triton Field, a transit center, two on-campus residence halls and a university satellite center for Central Washington University.

== Academics ==
The college offers two bachelor of applied science degrees, 63 associate degrees and 60 professional certificates in 25 programs of study.

Its highest enrolled programs are the Associate of Arts/Associate in Science degrees, Business, Pre-Nursing, Computer Science, Biology, and Materials Science and Engineering.

In 2017 the college was approved to offer a Bachelor of Applied Science Degree in Child, Youth and Family Studies, its first bachelor's degree program. In 2020 the college launched its Bachelor of Applied Science Degree in Information Technology — Application Development.

The college has unique Materials Science Technology and Restoration Horticulture degree.

=== Service-learning ===
Established in 2003, the college's service-learning program serves more than 600 students and provides 11,500 hours of service in the community to 100 campus and community partners each year. Programs include the AmeriCorps Retention Project (which works with TRiO Student Support Services, the Learn and Serve Environmental Anthropology Field (LEAF) School and Adult Basic Education ESL programs at the college). The Center for Service-Learning has been recognized nationally with a Howard R. Swearer Student Humanitarian Award from Campus Compact and a Service-Learning Collaboration Award from the Community College National Center for Community Engagement.

== Grants and research ==
From 1999 to 2012, the college received 20 National Science Foundation grants the first of which provided scholarships to low-income students studying computer science, engineering, and math. A subsequent NSF grant established a National Resource Center for Materials Technology Education to study ways to increase the recruitment of women and girls in science, technology, engineering, and mathematic STEM fields. In 1998, when the college hired its first grant writer, the college generated revenues of $9.5 million in grants and contracts. That number grew to $22.3 million in 2009. Today, the college's grants and contracts program makes up 24 percent of its operating budget, a larger proportion than at any other community college in the state.

== Athletics ==
The college fields nine athletic teams as part of the Northern Region of the Northwest Athletic Conference (NWAC) with volleyball, men's and women's cross country, men's and women's soccer, men's and women's basketball, softball, and baseball. Overall, Triton athletic programs have a rich and storied history, amassing 14 NWAC Championships and 56 North Region titles. The college's baseball team has won eight NWAC championships; 2014 is their most recent title. The four outdoor sports all practice and play their home games at Triton Field, which is an on-campus multi-sport field turf complex that was renovated in 2011 for over $2.5 million. The 4,860 square foot indoor hitting facility sits on the west edge of Triton Field and has two 70-foot cages, two 35-foot batting cages, and a player's lounge and lockers. Two indoor turf pitching mounds were built in 2013. The three indoor sports compete in Seaview Gymnasium (capacity 900), which is over 14,200 square feet and includes a weight room, aerobics room, instructional classroom, men's and women's locker rooms for students, men's and women's locker rooms for staff and faculty, and a small conference room.

Three individuals and one team have been inducted into the NWAC Hall of Fame to date: George Smith (former athletic director and longtime Vice President of Student Services), Keith Kingsbury (men's basketball coach), Janet Guenther (championship volleyball and softball coach), 1998 NWAC Championship baseball team (set NWAC records for home runs, 7 players off the team were selected in MLB draft).

=== Baseball ===
69 baseball players have been drafted from Edmonds College, including Don Long who is the current hitting coach for the Cincinnati Reds. The most recent player drafted was Zach Needham by the Seattle Mariners (2017) in the 40th round. The program has a reputation for moving players and coaches on to four-year colleges and universities as well. Former baseball coach Donnie Marbut later became head baseball coach at Washington State University from 2005 to 2015. Marbut's 2002 NWAC Championship team was inducted into the Triton Baseball Hall of Fame in 2016.

The college also has intramural athletics. There is also a full sized golf course owned by the City of Lynnwood adjacent to the campus. Spencer Stark, the current athletics director, joined the college in 2012. Former NBA player Phil Zevenbergen attended Edmonds College, as well as former Major League Baseball catcher Tom Lampkin. Lampkin was inducted into the Triton Baseball Hall of Fame in 2014.

== Campus housing ==
Student housing provides students a place to live while they learn at Edmonds College. The Homestay Program allows international students the cultural experience of living with a U.S. family. The program is designed to give international students the opportunity to learn, adapt, and experience U.S. culture first hand.

Edmonds College is one of the country's few community colleges to offer on-campus housing. The college opened its first on-campus residence hall, Rainier Place, in 2009. Rainier Place provides housing for 190 students attending both Edmonds College and Central Washington University - Lynnwood. With a total of 56 units in a mixture of 4-bedroom, 2-bedroom, double studio and single studio units, Rainier Place also has study lounges, a laundry facility as well as a community room for events and entertainment.

The college opened its second residence hall, Triton Court, in 2020. Triton Court provides housing for 220 students and is located directly across from the college's main entrance. The building has five floors and includes 24 studio units, 50 two-bedroom units, and 32 three-bedroom units. Each floor has a common study space and laundry facility, and the second floor has a residential lounge for social and community events. Apartments are fully furnished and feature private bedrooms, full kitchens, bathrooms, living rooms, and wireless internet access.

== Campus life ==
Edmonds College provides its students with various outlets for out-of-class socializing and learning. The Center for Student Engagement and Leadership (CSEL) provides students with events and programs to assist in mentoring their social learning as well as academics. CSEL also provides a lecture series that brings in public figures to share on various current topics.

In 2009, the college opened the Triton Student Center and a new bookstore. The 22,000-square-foot (2,000 m^{2}), two-story addition to Brier Hall is a $13.4 million project funded by student services and activities fees. It created space for student programs and clubs and features a study lounge with a fireplace.

== Notable alumni ==
- Tom Lampkin, professional baseball player
- Pat McQuistan, professional football player
- Ryan Strieby, professional baseball player
- Ty Taubenheim, professional baseball player
- Phil Zevenbergen, professional basketball player
