= Gregg Wallis =

American baseball coach

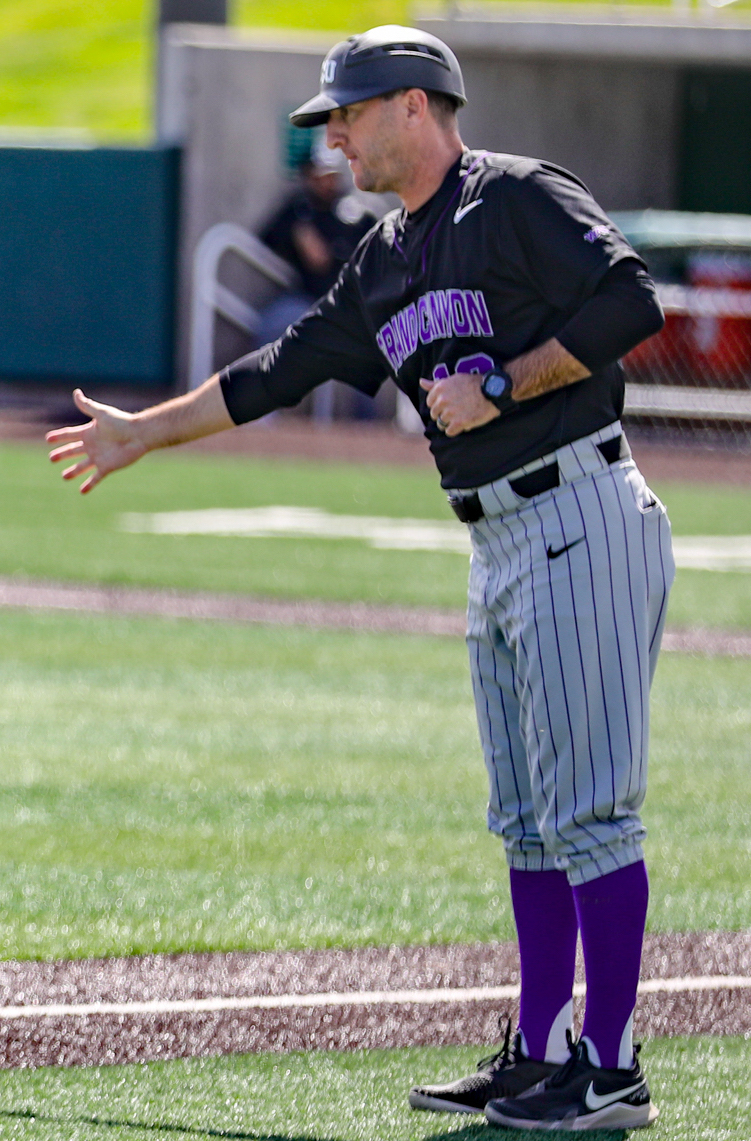
- Wallis as GCU third-base coach

Current position
- Title: Head coach
- Team: UC Riverside
- Conference: Big West

Biographical details
- Born: December 18, 1982 (age 43)
- Education: UC Irvine

Playing career
- 2002–2005: UC Irvine
- Position: Infielder

Coaching career (HC unless noted)
- 2006: UC Irvine (undergrad asst)
- 2008–2010: Cal State Fullerton (asst)
- 2011–2013: Tennessee (asst)
- 2014–2022: Grand Canyon (asst)
- 2022: Ohio State (asst)
- 2023–2026: Grand Canyon
- 2027–: UC Riverside

Administrative career (AD unless noted)
- 2007: UC Irvine (ops)

Head coaching record
- Overall: 112–91 (.552)
- Tournaments: NCAA: 2–2

Accomplishments and honors

Championships
- 2x WAC regular season (2023, 2024)

Awards
- 2x WAC Coach of the Year (2023, 2024)

Gregg Wallis (born December 18, 1982) is an American baseball coach and former infielder, who is the head baseball coach of the UC Riverside Highlanders. He played college baseball at UC Irvine under Dave Serrano. He held roles on college baseball coaching staffs at UC Irvine, Cal State Fullerton, Tennessee, Grand Canyon and Ohio State before getting his first head coaching opportunity at GCU on July 8, 2022.

== High school and college ==
Wallis attended Chatsworth High School in Chatsworth, Calif. before playing his college baseball at UC Irvine from 2002 to 2005.

== Coaching career ==
In 2006, his UC Irvine head coach, Dave Serrano, retained Wallis as an undergraduate assistant coach. He was promoted to director of operations in 2007 and was part of a staff that reached the program's first College World Series.

Wallis moved with Serrano to Cal State Fullerton in 2008, serving as an assistant coach. The Titans qualified for the NCAA Tournament in all three seasons Wallis was on staff, highlighted by a College World Series trip in 2009.

Wallis again followed Serrano to his next stop at Tennessee in 2011, spending three seasons as an assistant coach with the program.

In 2014, Andy Stankiewicz hired Wallis as an assistant coach at Grand Canyon for the program's first season back at the Division I level. Wallis was promoted to recruiting coordinator in 2016.

Following the 2022 season, Bill Mosiello was hired as the new head coach at Ohio State and hired Wallis as his lead assistant and recruiting coordinator.

=== Head coach at Grand Canyon ===
Stankiewicz departed Grand Canyon for USC on July 3, 2022, and Wallis was hired as Grand Canyon's head coach five days later. Several coveted GCU players who had entered the transfer portal — including shortstop Jacob Wilson who was playing with USA Baseball's Collegiate National Team and 2022 Western Athletic Conference Pitcher of the Year Daniel Avitia — announced their return to GCU within days of Wallis' hiring.

In his first season as head coach, Wallis led Grand Canyon to its third consecutive WAC regular-season championship and was named the WAC Coach of the Year. He repeated both of these feats in his second season in 2024 in addition to winning the program's first D-I NCAA tournament game and advancing to the program's first regional final.

GCU parted ways with Wallis on March 27, 2026.

=== Head coach at UC Riverside ===
Wallis was named UC Riverside's head coach on July 2, 2026.

=== College head coach record ===
Record table
Season	Team	Overall	Conference	Standing	Postseason
Grand Canyon Antelopes (Western Athletic Conference) (2023–2025)
2023	Grand Canyon	37–21	22–7	1st	WAC Tournament
2024	Grand Canyon	36–25	23–7	1st	NCAA regional
2025	Grand Canyon	31–27	13–11	t-3rd	WAC Tournament
Grand Canyon Antelopes (Mountain West Conference) (2026)
2026	Grand Canyon	8–18	0–3		
UC Riverside (Big West Conference) (2027–present)
2027	UC Riverside				
Total:		112–91 (.552)			
National champion Postseason invitational champion Conference regular season champion Conference regular season and conference tournament champion Division regular season champion Division regular season and conference tournament champion Conference tournament champion
