= Washington State Cougars baseball =

Baseball team of Washington State University

Washington State Cougars
- 2026 Washington State Cougars baseball team
- Founded: 1892
- University: Washington State University
- Head coach: Nathan Choate (3rd season)
- Conference: Pac-12
- Location: Pullman, Washington
- Home stadium: Bailey–Brayton Field (capacity: 3,500)
- Nickname: Cougars
- Colors: Crimson and gray

College World Series runner-up
- 1950

College World Series appearances
- 1950, 1956, 1965, 1976

NCAA regional champions
- 1976

NCAA tournament appearances
- 1950, 1956, 1960, 1961, 1965, 1966, 1975, 1976, 1977, 1978, 1984, 1987, 1988, 1990, 2009, 2010, 2026

Conference tournament champions
- Northwest Conference: 1915; PCC Northern Division: 1927; Pac-8 North: 1972; Pac-10 North: 1984, 1987, 1988, 1990; Mountain West: 2026

Conference regular season champions
- Northwest Conference: 1913, 1914, 1915, 1916, 1918; PCC Northern Division: 1927, 1928, 1933, 1936, 1938, 1944, 1945, 1947, 1948, 1949, 1950, 1956; AAWU: 1960, 1961, 1965, 1966; Pac-8 North: 1970, 1971, 1972, 1973, 1974, 1975, 1976, 1977, 1978; Pac-10 North: 1979, 1980, 1982, 1984, 1985, 1987, 1988, 1989, 1990, 1991, 1995

The Washington State Cougars baseball team is the varsity intercollegiate baseball team of Washington State University, located in Pullman, Washington. The Cougars' home venue is Bailey–Brayton Field, first opened 46 years ago for the 1980 season and located on the university's campus and they compete in the Pac-12 Conference (Pac-12).

The program was a baseball member of the Pac-12 Conference in NCAA Division I since the start of the 1960 season, following the dissolution of the Pacific Coast Conference. Through 2024, the Cougars have appeared in four College World Series and 16 NCAA tournaments. In conference postseason play, WSU has won one Northwest Conference Tournament, one Pacific Coast Conference Northern Division Tournament, one Pacific-8 Conference North Division Tournament, and four Pacific-10 Conference Northern Division Tournaments. In regular season play, the program has won five Northwest Conference Championships, 12 Pacific Coast Conference Northern Division titles, four AAWU Championships, nine Pac-8 North Division titles, and 11 Pac-10 North Division titles. As of the start of the 2013 Major League Baseball season, 32 former Cougars have appeared in Major League Baseball (MLB).

Following the dissolution of the Pac-12 Conference in 2024, WSU became an associate member of the Mountain West Conference for baseball from 2025 to 2026. On July 1, 2026, the Cougars re-joined the rebuilt Pac-12 Conference.

== History ==
=== Early years ===
The first season of organized baseball at the school was in 1892, shortly after the school's founding. In that season, the team had an 11–1 record; its first game was a 26–0 victory over Pullman Military College on March 12. After a three-year hiatus from 1893–1895, the team returned for one season in 1896. After another break in 1897, baseball at Washington State returned permanently in 1898. Previously led by team captains, H.E. Lougheed was named its first head coach for the 1901 season. Through the end of the 1909 season, the program competed as an independent and compiled a 110–59–1 (.650) record.

Washington State joined the Northwest Conference in 1910; prior to the 1912–1913 academic year, former head football coach John R. Bender returned to Pullman from Saint Louis University. He also served as the school's head baseball coach beginning with the 1913 season, in which the team won its first Northwest Conference title and finished at 7–1. The team won the conference title in 1914 and 1915, along with the conference tournament in 1915.

After the 1915 season, Bender left to coach football at Kansas State and was replaced by Fred Bohler, who led the team to Northwest Conference titles in 1916 and 1918. Following the 1918 season, the program joined the Pacific Coast Conference (PCC), which had been formed in December 1915. In its first season in the PCC, the team finished fourth in 1919.

In 1919, the college adopted the Cougar as its athletic programs' official nickname.

=== Buck Bailey era ===
In the summer of 1926, thirty-year-old Buck Bailey came to Pullman as an assistant football coach and head baseball coach. Born and raised in central Texas, Bailey played baseball and football at Texas A&M and served in the U.S. Army during the First World War. In his first season as head coach in 1927, the Cougar nine finished first in the PCC North Division and won the PCC Tournament. The team also won the North Division title in 1933, 1936, and 1938.

In 1932, Art McLarney debuted for the New York Giants on August 23 and became the program's first alumnus to play in the major leagues.

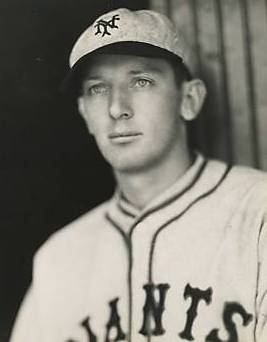
Art McLarney, while with the MLB's New York Giants.

In February 1943, Bailey joined the U.S. Navy during World War II. The Eugene Register-Guard article that announced Bailey's departure referred to him as an "athletic comedian," and other sources attest that Bailey had a colorful coaching style. For three seasons, 1943–1945, basketball coach Jack Friel coached the program.

Bailey returned prior to the start of 1946 season and resumed his coaching duties. From 1947–1950, the program won four consecutive PCC North Division titles. This run culminated in the program's first College World Series appearance in 1950, the first College World Series played at Rosenblatt Stadium in Omaha, Nebraska. To qualify, the Cougars defeated Stanford to win the PCC Tournament. At the World Series, WSC opened with three consecutive wins over Tufts, Alabama, and Rutgers, but lost 12–1 to defending champion Texas, who had lost their opener in the double-elimination tournament. The last two teams remaining and both with one loss, the Cougars and Longhorns met again three days later in the national championship game, which Texas won 3–0. Future major leaguers Ted Tappe and Gene Conley played on the 1950 team.

The program reached the College World Series again under Bailey in 1956. To qualify from District VIII, the team defeated USC in the PCC Tournament. At the CWS in Omaha, the Cougars were eliminated without a win after consecutive defeats to Bradley and New Hampshire, and tied for seventh place with NYU.

After the 1959 baseball season, the PCC dissolved on July 1 following a scandal involving illegal payments to football players at several of its schools. In reaction, five former PCC members, formed the Athletic Association of Western Universities (AAWU), which Washington State's baseball program joined when play began in the 1960 season. Later renamed the Pac-8, it became the Pac-10 in 1978 and the Pac-12 in 2011.

The program qualified for the NCAA tournament in each of its first two seasons in the AAWU. In both 1960 and 1961, the Cougars were eliminated by USC in Los Angeles in the District VIII Regional.

Three years after his retirement, Bailey and his wife Frances were killed in an automobile collision in New Mexico in October 1964.

=== Bobo Brayton era ===
Following Buck Bailey's retirement at the end of the 1961 season, the school hired Bobo Brayton, a former Washington State player and head baseball coach at Yakima Valley Junior College for a decade. In Brayton's first three seasons, WSU failed to qualify for the postseason, but won the AAWU North Division in 1965 and qualified for the NCAA tournament. In the second round of the District VIII Regional, the Cougars defeated Stanford and advanced to the College World Series in Omaha. WSU finished third, with wins over Texas and Connecticut, and two losses to Ohio State. The second loss to Ohio State was 1–0 in 15 innings, a complete game by Buckeye starter Steve Arlin, who recorded twenty strikeouts and gave up just three hits.

In 1966, WSU again qualified for the NCAA tournament but was eliminated by USC in the District VIII Regional finals. Following the season, future major leaguer Danny Frisella was selected by the New York Mets in the 1966 Major League Baseball draft. Following the 1968 season, two future major leaguers, Rick Austin and Ron Cey, signed professional contracts.

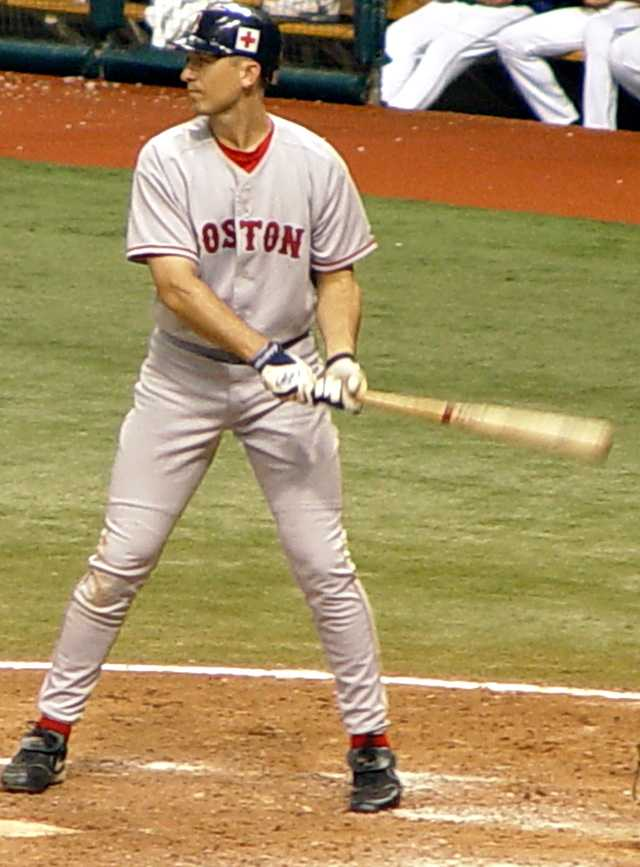
John Olerud, National Player of the Year in 1988, pictured with the MLB's Boston Red Sox.

After missing the playoffs for three consecutive seasons from 1967–1969, the Cougars won the Pac-8 North Division title and qualified for the Pac-8 Tournament in 1970. This division title started a streak of 11 consecutive North Division titles (1970–1981) and 19 of the 22 from 1970–1991. In that stretch, the program qualified for eight NCAA tournaments (1975, 1976, 1977, 1978, 1984, 1987, 1988, 1990). In 1976, the Cougars hosted and won the West Regional, defeating Pepperdine and Cal State Fullerton twice, in order to advance to the College World Series. In its first game, the team defeated Oklahoma, but then was eliminated by consecutive losses to Arizona State and Maine.

Following the 1979 baseball season, renovations of Martin Stadium, Washington State's football venue, led to the construction of a new running track. It was to be located on the site of today's Bailey–Brayton Field, but excavation difficulties led to an exchange of sites. The Mooberry Track was built on the old Bailey Field, north of Martin Stadium, and a new baseball venue was built to the east, retaining the name Bailey Field.

In 1984, stadium lighting was installed at the venue, and the first nighttime college baseball game in the Pacific Northwest was played between Washington State and Washington on May 11, 1984. In 1989, the field hosted Washington State's first nationally televised games, played on April 30 and May 1 against California and shown on ESPN.

In the late 1980s and early 1990s, two Cougars were named first team All-Americans. Both John Olerud, selected in 1988, and Aaron Sele, selected in 1990, had lengthy careers in Major League Baseball. In addition to being named an All-American in 1988, Olerud was named the National Player of the Year.

Brayton retired after the 1994 season, finishing his career at WSU with 1,162 wins in 33 seasons. His Cougar teams reached ten NCAA tournaments and two College World Series.

=== Post-Brayton ===
==== Steve Farrington ====
Steve Farrington, the head coach at Lower Columbia College in Longview for over a decade, was hired to replace Brayton in late June 1994. Originally from Newport, Oregon, he was a three-sport athlete at Eastern Washington in Cheney in the early 1970s; four years each of football and baseball and a year of basketball. Farrington's first season, 1995, was the third season of NCAA sanctions that had been imposed on the program for rules violations. The Cougars were 18–12 (.600) in conference and won the Pac-10 North, but were swept in the Pac-10 finals in Los Angeles by South champion USC, 9–6 and 4–0. Their overall record of 28–30 (.407) in 1995 was the first losing record at WSU since 1957, and the Cougars did not receive an at-large bid to the NCAA tournament. Pac-10 champion USC advanced to the College World Series and finished as runner-up.

From 1996–1998, Farrington's teams finished third in the Pac-10 North three times, missing the playoffs in each season. In both 1999 and 2000, after the Pac-10 abolished its divisions, Washington State finished last in the Pac-10, with conference records of 4–20 and 6–18, and his contract was not renewed following the 2000 season. Farrington's overall record with the Cougars in six seasons was 136–198 (.407), with a regular season conference record of 59–73 (.447). He later coached baseball at Columbia Basin College in Pasco, while also teaching science at Richland High School.

Prior to the 2000 season in January, Bailey Field was renamed Bailey–Brayton Field, adding Bobo Brayton's name to the Cougars' home venue.

==== Tim Mooney ====
In August 2000, Albertson College (College of Idaho) head coach Tim Mooney was hired to replace Farrington. Raised in Weiser, Idaho, he played at neighboring Idaho in the late 1970s, the final years of the Vandal baseball program. Mooney had great success as a head coach at Albertson in Caldwell, including an NAIA national title in 1998.

Under Mooney, the Cougars had losing conference records in each of his four seasons and finished no higher than a tie for eighth in the Pac-10. The only year with a winning overall record was his last in 2004, at 29–26 (.527), and 9–15 (.375) in conference. These struggles, combined with cases of Mooney physically and verbally abusing players, led to his resignation following the 2004 season. Mooney's overall record at WSU was 84–135 (.384) and 28–68 (.292) in conference. He was later a fundraiser for athletics for his alma mater in Moscow.

=== Donnie Marbut era ===
Donnie Marbut, who had served as an assistant under Mooney for one season in 2004, was promoted to head coach in late May. In his first several seasons at the helm, the program continued to struggle, finishing no higher than a sixth-place tie in the Pac-10. Marbut was also officially reprimanded by the university in 2006, when a Seattle Times report revealed that he had falsified parts of his résumé when applying for a coaching position at Washington State.

In 2009 and 2010, however, the Cougars finished near the top of the Pac-10 and appeared in the NCAA tournament in both seasons–their first postseason bids in 20 years. In the 2009 tournament, the team appeared in the Norman Regional as a #3 seed. After losing the opening game to Arkansas, the Cougars defeated Wichita State 3–2 in an elimination game. In the next game, however, they were eliminated by Oklahoma. In the 2010 tournament, the team earned a #2 seed in the Fayetteville Regional. This time, the team made it to within one win of the Super Regional round, but lost to Arkansas 7–2 in the elimination game. These are the Cougars' last postseason appearances to date.

After eleven seasons, a 314–304 record, and two post-season appearances, athletic director Bill Moos announced Marbut would not be returning for the 2016 season.

=== Marty Lees ===
On June 3, 2015, Marty Lees, an assistant from Oklahoma State was named head coach. After 4 seasons and an 68–132–1 record, Lees was fired on May 21, 2019.

=== Brian Green ===
On June 3, 2019, Brian Green was hired as the head coach away from the same position at New Mexico State. He led the Cougars for 4 seasons, compiling a 91–76 record, before getting hired as the head coach of the Wichita State Shockers on June 5, 2023.

=== Nathan Choate ===
On June 23, 2023, Nathan Choate was announced as the new head coach for the Cougars, having served in the same position for the Loyola Marymount Lions since 2020.

In 2024, after a mass exodus from the Pac-12 left Oregon State and Washington State as its only remaining members, the two schools announced they would become associate members of the West Coast Conference for all of that conference's sponsored sports, except for baseball. At the time of the announcement, on December 22, 2023, both schools had a 30-day window to potentially add baseball to their membership. The window expired on January 26, 2024 with no announcement from the WCC or either school. On April 16, 2024, Washington State announced that their baseball team would become an associate of the Mountain West Conference instead, beginning in the 2025 season (2024-25 academic year).

=== Conference affiliations ===
- Independent (1892, 1896, 1898–1909, 1917, 1924)
- Northwest Conference (1910–1916, 1918)
- Pacific Coast Conference (1919–1923, 1925–1959)
- Pac-12 Conference (1960–2024, 2027-)
  - Known as the Athletic Association of Western Universities from 1960–1968
  - Known as the Pacific-8 Conference from 1969–1978
  - Known as the Pacific-10 Conference from 1979–2011
- Mountain West Conference (2025–2026)

== Washington State in the NCAA tournament ==
Year	Record	Pct	Notes
1950	3–2	.600	College World Series Runner-up
1956	0-2	.500	College World Series 7th place
1960	0–2	.000	District 8
1961	0–2	.000	District 8
1965	4–2	.667	College World Series 3rd place, District 8 Champions
1966	2–2	.500	District 8
1975	3–2	.600	Rocky Mountain Regional
1976	4–2	.667	College World Series 5th place,West Regional Champion
1977	2–2	.500	Rocky Mountain Regional
1978	0–2	.000	Rocky Mountain Regional
1984	0–2	.000	West II Regional
1987	2–2	.500	West I Regional
1988	2–2	.500	West I Regional
1990	2–2	.500	West II Regional
2009	1–2	.333	Norman Regional
2010	3–2	.600	Fayetteville Regional
2026	1–2	.333	Eugene Regional
TOTALS	30-34	.469	

== Venues ==
=== Old Bailey Field ===
Following the Cougars' runner-up finish at the College World Series in 1950, the program's home venue was renamed Bailey Field. The Cougars played at the field through the end of the 1979 season; it was located on the current site of Mooberry Track, with home plate at its northwest corner.

=== Bailey–Brayton Field ===
Following the 1978 football season, the university expanded Martin Stadium and removed its running track; a new track & field venue was planned to the northeast, at the site of the present baseball stadium. Difficulties in excavation and soil compaction led to the switch of track and baseball sites in 1979, and a new baseball stadium was built; it maintained the name Bailey Field when it opened at the start of the 1980 season.

The field was renovated in 1981, 1984, and 1988. It was renamed Bailey–Brayton Field in early 2000, for Chuck Brayton, the program's head coach from 1962 to 1994. The facility has a capacity of 3,500 spectators and features a FieldTurf surface, electronic scoreboard, and stadium lighting.

== Head coaches ==
The Cougars' head coach is Nathan Choate, hired on June 23, 2023.

The program's longest-tenured and most successful head coach is Chuck Brayton, who was head coach for 33 seasons (1962–1994) and led the Cougars to 1,162 wins.

Year(s)	Coach	Seasons	Record	Pct.
1892, 1896, 1898–1900	No coach	5	21–9	.700
1901–1903	H. E. Lougheed	3	24–18	.571
1904	J. N. Ashmore	1	10–2	.833
1905–1906	Everett Sweeley	2	20–12	.625
1907–1908, 1913–1915	J. R. Bender	5	69–22–1	.758
1909–1912	Frank Sanger	4	27–36–1	.429
1916–1920	J. Fred Bohler	5	47–27–1	.635
1921–1922	Frank Barber	2	32–12	.728
1923–1926	Harry Applequist	4	66–29–1	.695
1927–1942, 1946–1961	Buck Bailey	32	603–325–5	.649
1943–1945	Jack Friel	3	29–24	.547
1962–1994	Chuck Brayton	33	1162–523–8	.689
1995–2000	Steve Farrington	6	138–198	.411
2001–2004	Tim Mooney	4	84–135	.384
2005–2015	Donnie Marbut	11	312–306	.505
2016–2019	Marty Lees	4	70–136–2	.341
2020–2023	Brian Green	4	91–79	.535
2024–present	Nathan Choate	2	70–96	.422
Totals	15	126	2875–1990–17	.591

== Yearly records ==
The following is a list of the program's yearly records since 1892, its first season of varsity competition.

Record table
Season	Coach	Overall	Conference	Standing	Postseason
Independent (1892–1892)
1892	No coach	11–1			
No program (1893–1895)
Independent (1896–1896)
1896	No coach	1–0			
No program (1897–1897)
Independent (1898–1909)
1898	No coach	5–3			
1899	No coach	4–2			
1900	No coach	0–3			
1901	H. E. Lougheed	10–6			
1902	H. E. Lougheed	5–7			
1903	H. E. Lougheed	9–5			
1904	J. N. Ashmore	10–2			
1905	Everett Sweeley	8–2			
1906	Everett Sweeley	12–10			
1907	J. R. Bender	16–3			
1908	J. R. Bender	14–4–1			
1909	Frank Sanger	5–11			
Independent:		110–59–1			
Northwest Conference (1910–1916)
1910	Frank Sanger	7–12	6–9	5th	
1911	Frank Sanger	10–7–1	9–6	2nd	
1912	Frank Sanger	5–6	3–4	3rd	
1913	J. R. Bender	11–3	7–1	1st	
1914	J. R. Bender	12–6	7–1	1st	NWC Tournament
1915	J. R. Bender	16–6	8–0	1st	NWC Tournament
1916	Fred Bohler	9–7–1	6–0	1st	
Independent (1917–1917)
1917	Fred Bohler	6–0			
Northwest Conference (1918–1918)
1918	Fred Bohler	13–1	11–1	1st	
NWC:		89–48–3	57–22–1		
Pacific Coast Conference (1919–1923)
1919	Fred Bohler	10–6	1–4	4th	
1920	Fred Bohler	9–13	2–7	6th	
1921	Frank Barber	17–6	8–4	2nd	
1922	Frank Barber	15–6	10–6	3rd	
1923	Harry Applequist	16–6	9–3	2nd (North)	
Independent (1924–1924)
1924	Harry Applequist	21–9–1			
Pacific Coast Conference (1925–1959)
1925	Harry Applequist	9–8	4–7	4th (North)	
1926	Harry Applequist	20–6	6–2	2nd (North)	PCC North Tournament
1927	Buck Bailey	13–5	6–2	1st (North)	PCC North Tournament
1928	Buck Bailey	13–7	6–2	t-1st (North)	PCC North Tournament
1929	Buck Bailey	14–9	9–7	2nd (North)	
1930	Buck Bailey	16–8	8–8	4th (North)	
1931	Buck Bailey	15–10	9–7	2nd (North)	
1932	Buck Bailey	19–7	11–4	2nd (North)	
1933	Buck Bailey	16–5	8–4	1st (North)	
1934	Buck Bailey	14–8	7–5	2nd (North)	
1935	Buck Bailey	15–12	8–8	t-3rd (North)	
1936	Buck Bailey	15–8–2	12–4–1	1st (North)	
1937	Buck Bailey	16–7	12–4	2nd (North)	
1938	Buck Bailey	12–15	10–6	t-1st (North)	
1939	Buck Bailey	16–13	10–6	2nd (North)	
1940	Buck Bailey	18–10	9–6	2nd (North)	
1941	Buck Bailey	17–13	8–8	t-3rd (North)	
1942	Buck Bailey	23–11	7–7	t-2nd (North)	
1943	Jack Friel	10–16	6–10	4th (North)	
1944	Jack Friel	10–3	3–1	1st (North)	
1945	Jack Friel	9–5	3–0	1st (North)	
1946	Buck Bailey	17–13	6–10	4th (North)	
1947	Buck Bailey	23–11–1	11–5	1st (North)	PCC Tournament
1948	Buck Bailey	21–7	8–3	1st (North)	PCC Tournament
1949	Buck Bailey	33–9	12–4	1st (North)	PCC Tournament
1950	Buck Bailey	32–6	12–2	1st (North)	College World Series
1951	Buck Bailey	30–11	11–5	2nd (North)	
1952	Buck Bailey	19–15	6–10	4th (North)	
1953	Buck Bailey	14–14–1	8–8	3rd (North)	
1954	Buck Bailey	18–12	7–9	4th (North)	
1955	Buck Bailey	13–8	6–4	3rd (North)	
1956	Buck Bailey	28–8	11–3	1st (North)	College World Series
1957	Buck Bailey	14–21	5–11	5th (North)	
1958	Buck Bailey	19–11	9–5	t-2nd (North)	
1959	Buck Bailey	20–15	10–6	2nd (North)	
PCC:		699–393–6	314–217–1		
AAWU/Pac-8/Pac-10/Pac-12 (1960–2024)
1960	Buck Bailey	29–6	9–2	1st (North)	NCAA Regional
1961	Buck Bailey	21–10	8–4	1st (North)	NCAA Regional
1962	Chuck Brayton	18–12–1	8–5	3rd (North)	
1963	Chuck Brayton	24–8	7–7	3rd (North)	
1964	Chuck Brayton	31–9	10–6	2nd (North)	
1965	Chuck Brayton	33–8	14–4	1st (North)	College World Series
1966	Chuck Brayton	35–8–1	15–1	1st (North)	NCAA Regional
1967	Chuck Brayton	22–10	7–6	6th (North)	
1968	Chuck Brayton	29–9	11–7	3rd (North)	
1969	Chuck Brayton	27–15	8–13	t-6th (North)	
1970	Chuck Brayton	30–11–1	9–6	1st (North)	Pac-8 Tournament
1971	Chuck Brayton	34–15	7–8	1st (North)	Pac-8 Tournament
1972	Chuck Brayton	29–13	14–4	t-1st (North)	Pac-8 Tournament
1973	Chuck Brayton	40–15	15–3	1st (North)	Pac-8 Tournament
1974	Chuck Brayton	38–9	14–4	t-1st (North)	
1975	Chuck Brayton	33–18	13–5	1st (North)	NCAA Regional
1976	Chuck Brayton	43–15	16–2	1st (North)	College World Series
1977	Chuck Brayton	39–17	14–4	1st (North)	NCAA Regional
1978	Chuck Brayton	41–17	15–3	1st (North)	NCAA Regional
1979	Chuck Brayton	40–11	12–3	1st (North)	Pac-10 Tournament
1980	Chuck Brayton	36–10–2	11–3	1st (North)	Pac-10 Tournament
1981	Chuck Brayton	27–25–1	11–7	t-2nd (North)	
1982	Chuck Brayton	34–16	16–8	t-1st (North)	
1983	Chuck Brayton	40–16–1	16–8	2nd (North)	
1984	Chuck Brayton	41–20	15–6	t-1st (North)	NCAA Regional
1985	Chuck Brayton	45–22	16–8	1st (North)	Pac-10 North Tournament
1986	Chuck Brayton	35–24	11–12	4th (North)	Pac-10 North Tournament
1987	Chuck Brayton	44–19	18–6	1st (North)	NCAA Regional
1988	Chuck Brayton	52–14	18–4	1st (North)	NCAA Regional
1989	Chuck Brayton	37–20	16–8	1st (North)	Pac-10 North Tournament
1990	Chuck Brayton	48–19	19–5	1st (North)	NCAA Regional
1991	Chuck Brayton	37–25	14–6	1st (North)	Pac-10 North Tournament
1992	Chuck Brayton	31–23–1	16–14	2nd (North)	
1993	Chuck Brayton	34–24	16–14	t-3rd (North)	
1994	Chuck Brayton	35–26	11–19	5th (North)	
1995	Steve Farrington	28–30	18–12	1st (North)	Pac-10 finals
1996	Steve Farrington	26–35	12–12	3rd (North)	
1997	Steve Farrington	13–42	7–17	3rd (North)	
1998	Steve Farrington	25–24	12–12	3rd (North)	
1999	Steve Farrington	24–31	4–20	9th	
2000	Steve Farrington	20–36	6–18	9th	
2001	Tim Mooney	15–39	6–18	9th	
2002	Tim Mooney	21–33	6–18	9th	
2003	Tim Mooney	19–37	7–17	t-8th	
2004	Tim Mooney	29–26	9–15	t-8th	
2005	Donnie Marbut	21–37	1–23	9th	
2006	Donnie Marbut	36–23	10–14	8th	
2007	Donnie Marbut	28–26	10–14	t-6th	
2008	Donnie Marbut	30–26	8–16	9th	
2009	Donnie Marbut	32–25	19–8	2nd	NCAA Regional
2010	Donnie Marbut	37–22	15–12	3rd	NCAA Regional
2011	Donnie Marbut	26–28	10–17	9th	
2012	Donnie Marbut	28–28	12–18	t-8th	
2013	Donnie Marbut	23–32	9–21	10th	
2014	Donnie Marbut	24–30	14–16	7th	
2015	Donnie Marbut	29–27	11–19	9th	
2016	Marty Lees	19–35	11–19	11th	
2017	Marty Lees	24–29	10–20	9th	
2018	Marty Lees	16–33–1	8-21-1	10th	
2019	Marty Lees	11–42–1	3–26–1	11th	
2020	Brian Green	9–7	0–0	–	Season canceled due to COVID-19
2021	Brian Green	26–23	13–17	t–8th	
2022	Brian Green	27–26	12–18	9th	
2023	Brian Green	29–23	10–19	10th	
2024	Nathan Choate	21-32	9-21	t-10th	
Pac-12:		1,928–1,426–10	732–723–2		
Mountain West (2025–2026)
2025	Nathan Choate	18-36	11-19	8th	
2026	Nathan Choate	31-28	15-9	2nd	NCAA Regional
Total:		2875–1990–19			
National champion Postseason invitational champion Conference regular season champion Conference regular season and conference tournament champion Division regular season champion Division regular season and conference tournament champion Conference tournament champion

== Notable former players ==
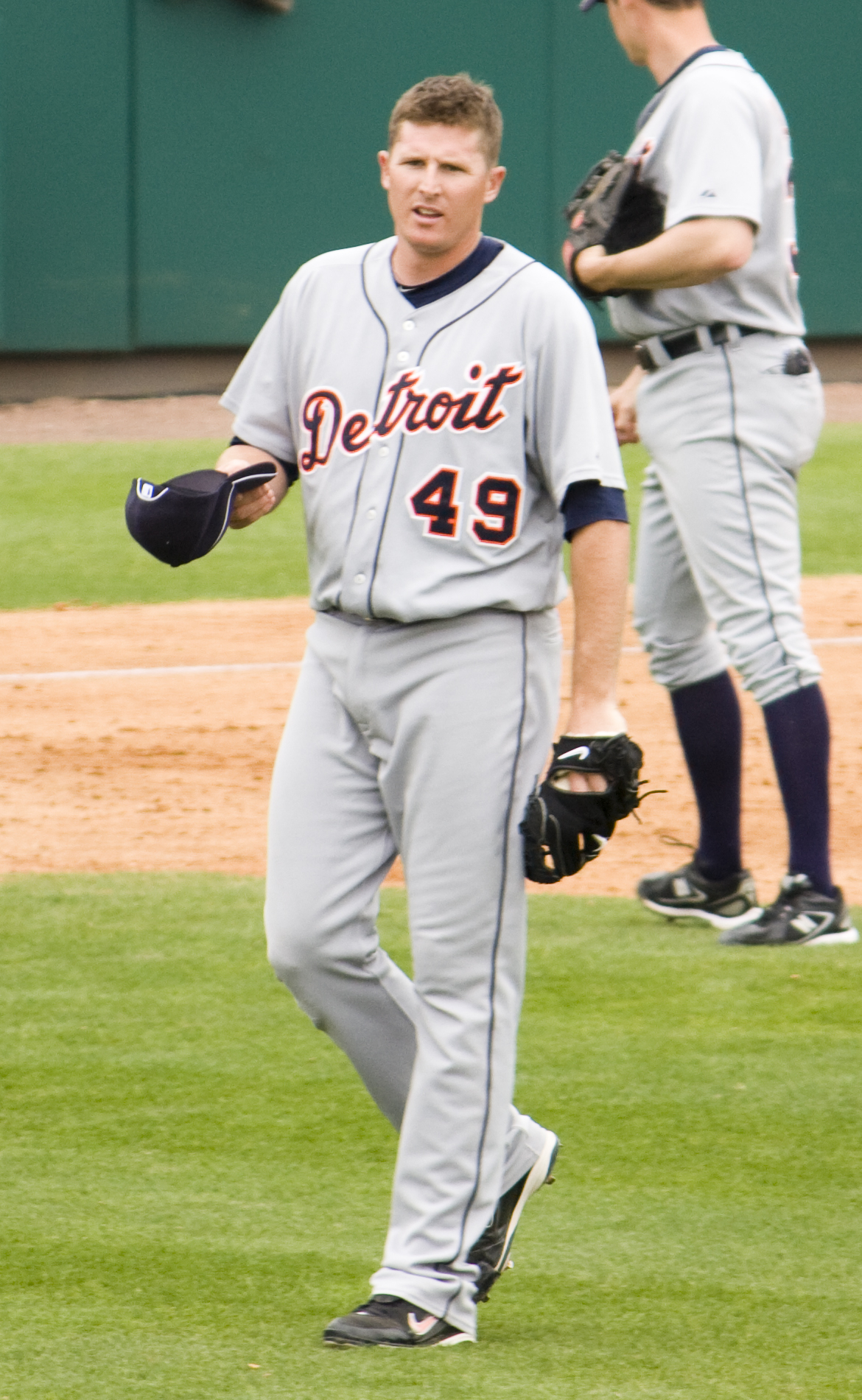
Eddie Bonine, while with the Detroit Tigers

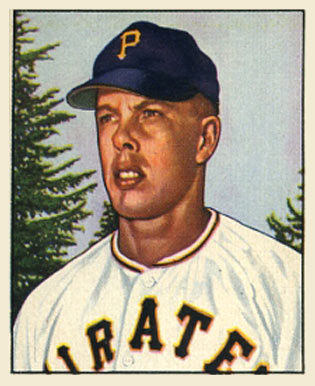
Cliff Chambers, while with the Pittsburgh Pirates

The following is a list of notable former Cougars and the seasons in which they played for the program.

- Norm Angelini (1968–1969)
- Rick Austin (1967–1968)
- Todd Belitz (1995–1997)
- Eddie Bonine (2002)
- Ed Bouchee (1952)
- Chuck Brayton (1946–1948)
- Alex Burg (2008–2009)
- Ron Cey (1968)
- Cliff Chambers (1941–1942)
- Gene Conley (1950)
- Don Crow (1977–1979)
- Dave Edler (1976–1978)
- Jack Friel (1921–1923)
- Danny Frisella (1965–1966)
- Greg Garrett (1967)
- Steve Gleason (1995-1999)
- Vince Hanson (1945)
- Scott Hatteberg (1990–1991)
- Mark Hendrickson (1995)
- Mike Kinkade (1992–1995)
- Mike Kinnunen (1977–1979)
- Don Long (1982–1983)
- Kyle Manzardo (2019-2021)
- Tom McGraw (1987–1990)
- Joe McIntosh (1971–1973)
- Art McLarney (1930–1932)
- Tom Niedenfuer (1979–1980)
- Paul Noce (1979–1981)
- John Olerud (1987–1989)
- Robert Ramsay (1993–1996)
- Rob Ryan (1993–1996)
- Aaron Sele (1989–1991)
- Doug Sisk (1980)
- Mark Small (1988–1989)
- Jack Spring (1952)
- Wes Stock (1954)
- Ted Tappe (1950)
- Dave Wainhouse (1986–1988)
- Eric Wilkins (1975–1977)

=== 2012 MLB draft ===
Five Cougars were selected in the 2012 Major League Baseball draft: 1B Taylor Ard by the Seattle Mariners (7th round), OF Derek Jones by the Colorado Rockies (8th round), 2B Tommy Richards by the Baltimore Orioles (24th round), OF Kyle Johnson by the Los Angeles Angels (25th round), and 3B Patrick Claussen (34th round). All five players elected to sign professional contracts.
