= Jacob Wilson (shortstop) =

American baseball player (born 2002)

Athletics – No. 5
- Shortstop
- Born: March 30, 2002 (age 24); Los Angeles, California, U.S.
- Bats: Right Throws: Right

MLB debut
- July 19, 2024, for the Oakland Athletics

MLB statistics (through 2026 season)
- Batting average: .288
- Home runs: 20
- Runs batted in: 103
- Stats at Baseball Reference

Teams
- Oakland Athletics / Athletics (2024–present)

Career highlights and awards
- All-Star (2025)
Medals
Men's baseball
Representing the United States
Haarlem Baseball Week
Bronze medal – third place	2022	Team

Jacob Wilson (born March 30, 2002) is an American professional baseball shortstop for the Athletics of Major League Baseball (MLB). Wilson played college baseball for the Grand Canyon Antelopes, and was selected sixth overall by the Oakland Athletics in the 2023 MLB draft. He made his MLB debut in 2024. Wilson was named to his first All-Star game in 2025. He is the son of former All-Star shortstop Jack Wilson.

== Amateur career ==
Wilson attended Thousand Oaks High School in Thousand Oaks, California, where he played for his father Jack Wilson, a former MLB shortstop. He played college baseball at Grand Canyon University.

As a freshman at Grand Canyon in 2021, Wilson played in 47 games as a third baseman, hitting .313/.376/.440 with four home runs and 29 runs batted in (RBI). In summer 2021, he played summer league baseball for the Mankato MoonDogs of the Northwoods League. He moved to shortstop his sophomore year in 2022. He hit .358/.418/.585 with 12 home runs and 65 RBI over 59 games that season. In 2022, he played collegiate summer baseball with the Orleans Firebirds of the Cape Cod Baseball League.

Wilson entered the 2023 season as one of the top prospects for the 2023 Major League Baseball draft. His father also joined the team's coaching staff that season.

== Professional career ==
The Oakland Athletics selected Wilson in the first round, with the sixth overall pick, of the 2023 MLB draft. He received a $5.5 million signing bonus.

Wilson began his professional career with the High–A Lansing Lugnuts, where he hit .318 in 88 at-bats. He then appeared in 3 games for the rookie–level Arizona Complex League Athletics, hitting 5-for-11 with five RBI. To start the 2024 season, Wilson hit .455 with three home runs in 88 at-bats with the Double-A Midland RockHounds before being promoted to the Triple-A Las Vegas Aviators.

On July 19, 2024, Wilson was selected to the 40-man roster and promoted to the major leagues for the first time. In 28 appearances for Oakland during his rookie campaign, he batted .250/.314/.315 with three RBI.

On March 31, 2025, Wilson hit his first career home run, a solo shot off of Ben Brown of the Chicago Cubs. On July 2, Wilson earned a spot as a starter in the All-Star Game, becoming the third fan-elected player from the Athletics since 1993. In 125 appearances for the Athletics, he batted .311/.355/.444 with 13 home runs, 63 RBI, and five stolen bases.

On January 30, 2026, Wilson and the Athletics agreed to a seven-year, $70 million contract extension. On August 9, Wilson set an MLB record for a shortstop by completing his 111th consecutive game without an error, during the Athletics' 4–3 victory over the Boston Red Sox at Fenway Park. On August 25, Wilson was transferred to the 60–day injured list, officially ending his season. On September 9, Wilson underwent surgery to repair his left shoulder.

Awards and achievements
Preceded by Kristian Campbell	American League Rookie of the Month; May 2025	Succeeded by Nick Kurtz
