= Nathan Choate =

American college baseball coach and former pitcher

Current position
- Title: Head coach
- Team: Washington State
- Conference: Pac-12
- Record: 70–96 (.422)

Biographical details
- Born: October 22, 1978 (age 47); Yorba Linda, California, U.S.

Playing career
- 1998–1999: Santa Ana
- 2000–2001: Cal Poly
- Position: Pitcher

Coaching career (HC unless noted)
- 2005: Esperanza H. S. (asst.)
- 2007: UC Irvine (asst.)
- 2008–2011: UC Riverside (asst.)
- 2012–2016: Grand Canyon (asst.)
- 2017–2018: San Diego (asst.)
- 2019: Loyola Marymount (asst.)
- 2020–2023: Loyola Marymount
- 2024–present: Washington State

Administrative career (AD unless noted)
- 2006: UC Irvine (DBO)

Head coaching record
- Overall: 155–199–1 (.438)
- Tournaments: Mountain West: 3–1; NCAA: 1–2; West Coast: 0–2

Accomplishments and honors

Championships
- Mountain West Tournament (2026)

Awards
- WCC Coach of the Year (2023)

Nathan Choate (born October 22, 1978) is an American college baseball coach and former pitcher. He is the head baseball coach at Washington State University. Previously, he was the head coach at Loyola Marymount University for four seasons. Choate played college baseball at Santa Ana College, before then transferring to California Polytechnic State University for his final two seasons.

== Playing career ==
Choate attended Esperanza High School where he was a member of the school's baseball team. After graduation, Choate choose to attend Santa Ana College. After two seasons at Santa Ana, Choate transferred to Cal Poly.

== Coaching career ==
In 2006, Choate served as pitching coach of the Hyannis Mets, a collegiate summer baseball team in the Cape Cod Baseball League.

On June 10, 2011, Choate was named the pitching coach and recruiting coordinator for Grand Canyon. On June 24, 2016, Choate was named the pitching coach at San Diego. On August 20, 2018, Choate was named the pitching coach at Loyola Marymount. In 2019, he helped lead the Lions to a return to the NCAA tournament, a 2019 WCC Tournament Title and WCC Pitcher of the Year Codie Paiva.

On June 25, 2019, Choate was named the head coach of Loyola Marymount.

On June 23, 2023, Choate was announced as the new head coach at Washington State. In his third season with the Cougars, he led the program to their first NCAA Division I Baseball tournament in 16 years.

On June 15, 2026, it was announced Choate had signed a contract extension with Washington State, keeping him with the Cougars through the 2031 season.

== Head coaching record ==
Record table
Season	Team	Overall	Conference	Standing	Postseason
Loyola Marymount Lions (West Coast Conference) (2020–2023)
2020	Loyola Marymount	8–8	0–0		Season canceled due to COVID-19
2021	Loyola Marymount	28–37	13–14	6th	
2022	Loyola Marymount	20–34–1	14–13	6th	
2023	Loyola Marymount	29–24	21–6	1st	
Loyola Marymount:		85–103–1 (.452)	48–33 (.593)		
Washington State Cougars (Pac-12 Conference) (2024)
2024	Washington State	21–32	9–21	T–10th	
Washington State Cougars (Mountain West Conference) (2025–present)
2025	Washington State	18–36	11–19	8th	
2026	Washington State	31–28	15–9	2nd	NCAA Regional
Washington State:		70–96 (.422)	35–49 (.417)		
Total:		155–199–1 (.438)			
National champion Postseason invitational champion Conference regular season champion Conference regular season and conference tournament champion Division regular season champion Division regular season and conference tournament champion Conference tournament champion

== See also ==
- List of current NCAA Division I baseball coaches
