= Grand Canyon Antelopes baseball =

American college baseball team

- 2026 Grand Canyon Antelopes baseball team
- Founded: 1953 (72 years ago)
- Overall record: 566–554–3 (Division I); 2,146–1,438–11 (Overall)
- University: Grand Canyon University
- Head coach: Steve Bieser (1st season)
- Conference: Mountain West Conference
- Location: Phoenix, Arizona
- Home stadium: Brazell Field at GCU Ballpark (capacity: 4,000)
- Nickname: Lopes
- Colors: Purple, black, and white

NCAA tournament appearances
- 2021, 2022, 2024

Conference tournament champions
- 2021

Conference regular season champions
- 2015, 2017, 2018, 2021, 2022, 2023, 2024

Conference division regular season champions
- 1998, 2022

The Grand Canyon Antelopes baseball team represents Grand Canyon University, which is located in Phoenix, Arizona. The Antelopes, also known as the Lopes, are an NCAA Division I college baseball program competing as members of the Mountain West Conference. They were in Division I from 1991 to 1998, the final four seasons in the WAC, and returned to the WAC from 2014 to 2025.

GCU plays all home games on campus at Brazell Field at GCU Ballpark. Over its 18 discontinuous seasons in the WAC, GCU won eight regular-season titles.

In 2024, GCU was recognized as the No. 52 ranked college baseball program in the nation by D1Baseball.

Since the program's inception in 1953, 18 Lopes have gone on to play Major League Baseball, highlighted by 1993 AL Rookie of the Year and 2002 World Series champion Tim Salmon and 2023 sixth overall pick Jacob Wilson. Wilson also became the first Lope to be selected as an MLB All-Star in 2025.

== History ==
=== Founding ===
Dr. Dave Brazell founded Grand Canyon's baseball program and it began play in 1953. The team lost its first game to Phoenix College on March 23, 1953. The team won its first game against Eastern Arizona College on March 27, 1954.

=== NAIA Championships ===
The Lopes won four NAIA National Championships in the 1980s: 1980, 1981, 1982 and 1986.

=== Andy Stankiewicz (2012–22) ===
GCU hired Andy Stankiewicz on April 25, 2011.

Stankiewicz led the program in its final two seasons at the Division II level, the duration of the four-year transition period to the Division I level, and to the school's first two NCAA Division I tournament appearances.

In his first season, Stankiewicz inherited a team with a losing record and went 27–23 in his first season. In his second season in 2013, Stankiewicz led the Lopes to the D-II College World Series for the first time.

The Lopes found immediate success in 2014, their first back at the D-I level. GCU finished second in the WAC standings.

GCU won its first outright WAC regular-season championship in 2015. The Lopes won the 2017, 2018, 2021 and 2022 WAC regular-season titles under Stankiewicz.

Stankiewicz led GCU to its first WAC Tournament Championship in 2021 and first trip to the NCAA tournament.

Despite entering the 2022 WAC Tournament as the No. 1 seed, Grand Canyon went 2–2 to get eliminated from the tournament. Carried by a strong regular-season campaign and a No. 50 RPI, the Lopes earned their first at-large selection into the NCAA tournament.

Stankiewicz was announced as USC's head coach on July 3, 2022, ending an 11-year run leading the program.

=== Gregg Wallis (2023–26) ===
A nine-year assistant coach under Stankiewicz, Wallis had departed GCU following the 2022 season to take an assistant coach position on Bill Mosiello's staff at Ohio State. GCU brought Wallis back to be its head coach, making the official announcement on July 8, 2022.

Wallis continued GCU's streak of WAC regular-season success by winning championships in 2023 and 2024. GCU did not win the WAC Tournament in either season.

The Lopes advanced to the 2024 NCAA tournament after Tarleton State — ineligible for NCAA postseason as a transitioning school — went on to win the conference tournament. GCU took advantage of its second life, winning its first D-I NCAA tournament game in program history by defeating Arizona 9-4 on May 31 in front of the largest crowd in Hi Corbett Field history. The Lopes took it a step further, recovering from a June 1 loss to West Virginia by defeating Dallas Baptist to advance to the regional final. GCU lost to West Virginia again to end the Lopes' most successful postseason run at the D-I level.

GCU parted ways with Wallis on March 27, 2026.

=== Steve Bieser (2027–pres.) ===
Bieser was named GCU's head coach on June 2, 2026, and was introduced at a press conference on June 4, 2026.

== Conference membership history ==
Grand Canyon's baseball program has a unique conference membership history that includes a brief stint from 1991–1998 where the program was Division I in baseball but the rest of the university's athletic department was Division II.

Grand Canyon conference membership timeline
Seasons	Classification	Conference
1953–1960	none	
1961–1967	NAIA	Independent (associate member)
1968–1990	NAIA	Independent (full member)
1991–1994	NCAA Division I	Independent
1995–1998	NCAA Division I	Western Athletic Conference
1999–2004	NCAA Division II	California Collegiate Athletic Association
2005–2009	NCAA Division II	Independent
2010–2013	NCAA Division II	Pacific West Conference
2014–2025	NCAA Division I	Western Athletic Conference
2026– (Note: GCU announced it will "join no later than July 1, 2026, but possibly as early as the second quarter of 2025 if permitted under the conference's bylaws.")	NCAA Division I	Mountain West Conference

=== NAIA era ===
Grand Canyon's first athletic affiliation came in 1961 as an associate member of the NAIA. They became full members of the NAIA for the 1968 season, opening postseason participation opportunities.

=== Baseball's Division I jump ===
The school opted to move out of the NAIA and into the NCAA in the late 1980s, primarily due to the cost burden of traveling to postseason competition and increasingly stringent NAIA rules. Most of the school's athletic programs landed at the NCAA Division II level, however, baseball opted to go Division I as an independent. The baseball program played its first four D-I years as an independent.

In June 1994, GCU accepted a baseball-only invite to the Western Athletic Conference in the form of a year-to-year affiliate membership agreement. The Lopes began play in the conference in 1995 and spent four seasons in the conference. GCU's membership was not renewed following the 1998 season, and the university decided to reclassify the program to D-II. Already knowing it would not be a D-I program the following season, the 1998 team won the program's first D-I regular-season conference title by going 16-14 in WAC play to win the North Division.

=== Division II membership ===
When the WAC ended its affiliate membership arrangement, GCU opted to move to D-II rather than remaining a D-I team as an independent. The Lopes spent one year transitioning in 1999, officially classified as a D-I program but largely playing D-II schools. GCU officially joined the California Collegiate Athletic Association in 2000.

GCU announced an intent to return to NAIA in May 2003. This hit a snag in April 2004, after the school's dire financial situation led the institution to turn to a for-profit model. NAIA bylaws did not allow such institutions, and GCU was forced to remain in the NCAA despite already withdrawing from the CCAA. The program was forced to be a D-II independent while the university searched for financial stability and a conference home.

GCU's athletic department moved to the Pacific West Conference beginning in the 2006-07 academic year, however the conference did not sponsor baseball as an official sport until 2010.

=== Return to D-I ===
With exploding enrollment and financial stability, GCU announced an all-sport jump to D-I athletics in November 2012. The baseball team would return to the WAC beginning in the 2014 season.

On May 10, 2024, GCU announced most of its sports would transition to the West Coast Conference in time for the 2026 baseball season. On November 1, 2024, GCU announced it had accepted an invite from the Mountain West Conference to join no later than the 2027 baseball season.

=== Record breakdown by classification ===
Years	Classification	Record	Pct.
1961–90	NAIA	1,169–498–8	.700
1999-13	NCAA Division II	411–386	.516
1991–98, 2014–pres.	NCAA Division I (overall)	566–554–3	.505
2014–pres.	NCAA Division I (second stint)	378–270–2	.583
Totals		2,146–1,438–11	.598

== Brazell Field at GCU Ballpark ==
Brazell Field at GCU Ballpark is a baseball stadium on the Grand Canyon campus in Phoenix, Arizona that seats 4,000 people. While the field has remained in place since 1962, a new stadium was constructed around the playing surface. It was opened on February 16, 2018 with a 2–1 loss to TCU. A record attendance of 5,281 was set on February 16, 2024, an opening day win over Georgetown. The record was broken again a year later when GCU hosted Vanderbilt in front of 5,294 to open the 2025 season on MLB Network.

== Head coaches ==
In a program that has existed since 1953, Grand Canyon has had extreme continuity in its head coaching position. David Brazell founded the program and coached it for its first 28 years. Gil Stafford coached for 20 years including the program's first run at the Division I level. Alumnus and former Major leaguer Dave Stapleton coached the team for 10 years. Andy Stankiewicz took over for the 2012 season and led the program through its first nine seasons back at the Division I level beginning in 2014. His longtime assistant, Gregg Wallis, took over for Stankiewicz in the 2023 season.

Head Coach	Years	Seasons	Record	Pct.
Dave Brazell	1953–80	28	728–385–8	.653
Gil Stafford	1981–00	20	760–541–1	.584
Dave Stapleton	2001–11	10	256–290	.469
Ryan Bethel (interim)	2011	<1	15–11	.577
Andy Stankiewicz	2012–22	11	341–239–2	.588
Gregg Wallis	2023–26	3+	112–91	.552
Nathan Bannister	2026	<1	13-12	.520
Steve Bieser	2027–			
Totals		72	2,159–1,450–11	.598

== Year-by-year NCAA Division I results ==
Records taken from the 2020 GCU baseball media guide.

Record table
Season	Coach	Overall	Conference	Standing	Postseason
Independent (1991–1994)
1991	Gil Stafford	25–39			
1992	Gil Stafford	25–37			
1993	Gil Stafford	24–32			
1994	Gil Stafford	29–33–1			
Western Athletic Conference (1995–1998)
1995	Gil Stafford	21–41	15–15	5th	
1996	Gil Stafford	23–32	10–19	10th	
1997	Gil Stafford	13–43	5–25	12th	
1998	Gil Stafford	28–27	16–14	5th	WAC Tournament
Western Athletic Conference (2014–present)
2014	Andy Stankiewicz	30–23	19–8	2nd	ineligible
2015	Andy Stankiewicz	32–22	19–7	1st	ineligible
2016	Andy Stankiewicz	25–28–1	13–14	5th	ineligible
2017	Andy Stankiewicz	29–25	20–4	1st	ineligible
2018	Andy Stankiewicz	33–24	19–5	1st	WAC tournament
2019	Andy Stankiewicz	36–24	18–9	T-4th	WAC tournament
2020	Andy Stankiewicz	9–9			Season cancelled on March 18 due to Coronavirus pandemic
2021	Andy Stankiewicz	39–21-1	29-7	T-1st	NCAA tournament
2022	Andy Stankiewicz	41-21	25-5	1st	NCAA tournament
2023	Gregg Wallis	37-21	22-7	1st	WAC tournament
2024	Gregg Wallis	36-25	23-7	1st	NCAA Tournament
2025	Gregg Wallis	31-27	13-11	t-3rd	WAC tournament
Total:		566–494–3			
National champion Postseason invitational champion Conference regular season champion Conference regular season and conference tournament champion Division regular season champion Division regular season and conference tournament champion Conference tournament champion

== NCAA tournament history (Division I only) ==
Year	Record	Pct	Notes
2021	0–2	.000	Clinched berth by winning 2021 WAC baseball tournament Eliminated by Oklahoma State in the Tucson Regional
2022	0–2	.000	Earned at-large bid Eliminated by Missouri State in the Stillwater Regional
2024	2–2	.500	Clinched berth by winning 2024 WAC Regular-Season Championship Eliminated by West Virginia in the Tucson Regional Final
Total	2–6	.250	Total NCAA tournament Appearances: 3

== Awards and honors (Division I only) ==
- Over their 11 discontinuous seasons in the Western Athletic Conference, 18 different Lopes have been named to the all-conference first-team.

=== All-Americans ===
Year	Position	Name	Selector
2023	SS	Jacob Wilson	CB

=== Freshman All-Americans ===
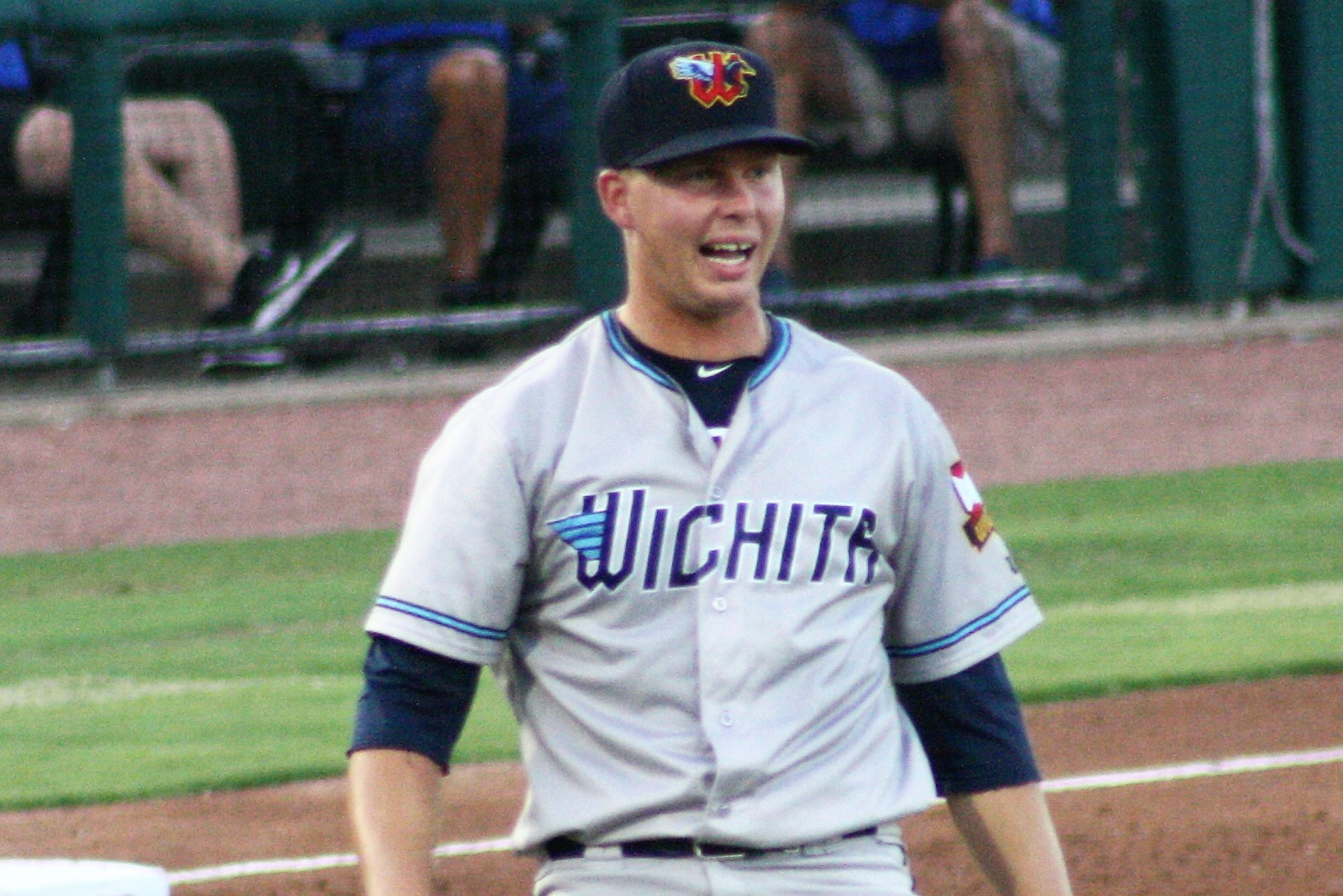
Pierson Ohl playing for the Wichita Wind Surge

Year	Position	Name	Selector
2019	SP	Pierson Ohl	CB
2021	1B	Elijah Buries	CB
2021	1B	Elijah Buries	PG
2021	3B	Jacob Wilson	CB
2021	SP	Carter Young	CB
2021	SP	Carter Young	D1
2021	SP	Carter Young	NCBWA
2022	SP	Daniel Avitia	CB
2022	SP	Daniel Avitia	PG
2023	1B	Zach Yorke	CB

=== Western Athletic Conference Player of the Year ===
Year	Position	Name
2017	OF	Garrison Schwartz
2018	OF	Quin Cotton
2024	OF	Tyler Wilson

=== Western Athletic Conference Pitcher of the Year ===
Year	Position	Name
2021	SP	Pierson Ohl
2022	SP	Daniel Avitia

=== Western Athletic Conference Defensive Player of the Year ===
Year	Position	Name
2023	SS	Jacob Wilson

=== Western Athletic Conference Coach of the Year ===
Year	Name
2017	Andy Stankiewicz
2018	Andy Stankiewicz
2021	Andy Stankiewicz
2022	Andy Stankiewicz
2023	Gregg Wallis
2024	Gregg Wallis

=== Western Athletic Conference Freshman of the Year ===
Year	Position	Name
2015	OF	Garrison Schwartz
2019	SP	Pierson Ohl
2022	SP	Daniel Avitia

Taken from the 2020 GCU baseball media guide. Updated March 2, 2020.

== Lopes in professional baseball ==
=== Draft history ===
As of 2024, Grand Canyon has had 108 of its players selected in the MLB draft. Thirty-three of those selections have occurred since 2015 when the program returned to Division I.

On July 9, 2023, Jacob Wilson became the highest drafted player in program history when he went sixth overall to the Oakland Athletics.

=== Major Leaguers ===
= All-Star	= Baseball Hall of Famer

GCU MLB No.	Athlete	Years in MLB	MLB teams
1	Frank Snook	1973	San Diego Padres
2	Tom Tellmann	1979–80, 1983–85	San Diego Padres, Milwaukee Brewers, Oakland Athletics
3	Dave Stapleton	1987–88	Milwaukee Brewers
4	Brad Moore	1988, 1990	Philadelphia Phillies
5	Randy McCament	1989–90	San Francisco Giants
6	Kevin Wickander	1989–90, 1992–93, 1995–96	Cleveland Indians, Cincinnati Reds, Detroit Tigers, Milwaukee Brewers
7	John Patterson	1992–95	San Francisco Giants
8	Chad Curtis	1992–01	California Angels, Detroit Tigers, Los Angeles Dodgers, Cleveland Indians, New York Yankees, Texas Rangers
9	Tim Salmon	1992–04, 2006	California/Anaheim/Los Angeles Angels
10	Brett Merriman	1993–94	Minnesota Twins
11	Paul Swingle	1993	California Angels
12	Steve Phoenix	1994–95	Oakland Athletics
13	Cody Ransom	2001–04, 2007–13	San Francisco Giants, Houston Astros, New York Yankees, Philadelphia Phillies, Arizona Diamondbacks, Milwaukee Brewers, San Diego Padres, Chicago Cubs
14	Brian Broderick	2011	Washington Nationals
15	Jake Wong	2023	Cincinnati Reds
16	Jacob Wilson	2024–pres.	Oakland Athletics
17	Pierson Ohl	2025–pres.	Minnesota Twins, Colorado Rockies
18	Zach Thornton	2026–pres.	New York Mets

Taken from the 2024 GCU baseball media guide. Updated May 22, 2024.

== See also ==
- List of NCAA Division I baseball programs
