= 1966 St. John's Redmen baseball team =

61st team at St John's Baseball

1966 St. John's Redmen baseball

District II champions

College World Series, 4th
- Conference: Independent
- Record: 25–9
- Head coach: John Kaiser (11th season)
- Captain: Joe Russo
- Home stadium: Alley Pond Park

The 1966 St. John's Redmen baseball team represented the St. John's University in the 1966 NCAA University Division baseball season. The Redmen played their home games at Alley Pond Park. The team was coached by Jack Kaiser in his St. John's University in his 11th year at St. John's.

The Redmen won District II to advance to the College World Series, where they were defeated by the Oklahoma State Cowboys.

== Roster ==
1966 St. John's Redmen baseball team
Players
Coaches

#	Pos.	Name	B/T	Height	Weight	Year	Home town
		Ralph Addonizio	/	—	—
		George Blednick	/	—	—
		Joe Bruno	/	—	—
		John DeBiase	/	—	—
		Richie Freund	/	—	—
	INF	Matt Galante	/	—	—
		Mike Gorman	/	—	—
		Wally Gross	/	—	—
		Ronald Guzas	/	—	—
		Frank Madden	/	—	—
	P	Larry Mushinske	/	—	—
	P	Rich Napolitano	/	—	—	So
		Frank Palmieri	/	—	—
		William Permakoff	/	—	—
	INF	Joe Russo (C)	/	—	—	Sr
		Wayne Stack	/	—	—
	P	Walt Witowski	/	—	—
		John Zarzicki	/	—	—

Head coach

Jack Kaiser

Assistant coach(es)

Legend

- (C) Team captain
- (S) Suspended
- (I) Ineligible
- Injured
- Current redshirt

== Schedule ==
1966 St. John's Redmen baseball game log
Regular season
March (3–0)

#	Date	Opponent	Site/stadium	Score	Overall record
1	March 26	C.W. Post	Alley Pond Park • New York, New York	22–3	1–0
2	March 30	Colgate	Alley Pond Park • New York, New York	7–2	2–0
3	March 31	C.W. Post	Alley Pond Park • New York, New York	9–0	3–0

April (14–2)

#	Date	Opponent	Site/stadium	Score	Overall record
4	April 1	at Adelphi	Alley Pond Park • New York, New York	4–3	4–0
5	April 6	Kings Point	Alley Pond Park • New York, New York	1–2	4–1
6	April 7	Bridgeport	Alley Pond Park • New York, New York	12–3	5–1
7	April 9	at CCNY	Unknown • New York, New York	15–7	6–1
8	April 11	New Haven	Alley Pond Park • New York, New York	15–0	7–1
9	April 12	Rutgers	Alley Pond Park • New York, New York	2–1	8–1
10	April 14	at Southern Connecticut State	Unknown • New Haven, Connecticut	1–9	8–2
11	April 15	Saint Peter's	Alley Pond Park • New York, New York	6–1	9–2
12	April 16	LIU	Alley Pond Park • New York, New York	3–1	10–2
13	April 19	St. Francis	Alley Pond Park • New York, New York	8–6	11–2
14	April 21	Fordham	Alley Pond Park • New York, New York	2–0	12–2
15	April 22	Pace	Alley Pond Park • New York, New York	11–2	13–2
16	April 23	at NYU	Unknown • New York, New York	7–0	14–2
17	April 26	Queens College	Alley Pond Park • New York, New York	3–2	15–2
18	April 27	at Hofstra	University Field • Hempstead, New York	12–3	16–2
19	April 30	at Iona	Unknown • New Rochelle, New York	3–1	17–2

May (3–5)

#	Date	Opponent	Site/stadium	Score	Overall record
20	May 3	at Seton Hall	Owen T. Carroll Field • South Orange, New Jersey	4–5	17–3
21	May 7	at Fairleigh Dickinson	Unknown • Teaneck, New Jersey	0–1	17–4
22	May 10	at Army	Doubleday Field • West Point, New York	0–10	17–5
23	May 11	Wagner	Alley Pond Park • New York, New York	13–3	18–5
24	May 12	Rhode Island	Alley Pond Park • New York, New York	1–0	19–5
25	May 14	Manhattan	Van Cortlandt Park • New York, New York	2–4	19–6
26	May 15	at Rider	Alley Pond Park • Lawrenceville, New Jersey	4–7	19–7
27	May 17	Upsala	Alley Pond Park • New York, New York	9–0	20–7

Postseason
NCAA District II Playoff (3–0)

#	Date	Opponent	Site/stadium	Score	Overall record
28	June 3	vs Rutgers	Bill Clarke Field • Princeton, New Jersey	9–4	21–7
29	June 5	vs Lafayette	Bill Clarke Field • Princeton, New Jersey	2–0	22–7
30	June 5	vs Lafayette	Bill Clarke Field • Princeton, New Jersey	8–3	23–7

College World Series (2–2)

#	Date	Opponent	Site/stadium	Score	Overall record
31	June 13	vs Northeastern	Johnny Rosenblatt Stadium • Omaha, Nebraska	5–3	24–7
32	June 14	vs Texas	Johnny Rosenblatt Stadium • Omaha, Nebraska	2–0	25–7
33	June 15	vs Ohio State	Johnny Rosenblatt Stadium • Omaha, Nebraska	7–8	25–8
34	June 17	vs Oklahoma	Johnny Rosenblatt Stadium • Omaha, Nebraska	1–6	25–9

== Awards and honors ==
Matt Galante

- All Tournament Team

Joe Russo

- All Tournament Team
