= 1966 USC Trojans baseball team =

American college baseball season

1966 USC Trojans baseball

CIBA Champions District VIII Champions

College World Series, T-3rd
- Conference: California Intercollegiate Baseball Association
- Record: 42–9 (16–4 CIBA)
- Head coach: Rod Dedeaux (25th season)
- Home stadium: Bovard Field

1966 Athletic Association of Western Universities baseball standings
	Conf.						Overall
Team	W		L		T	PCT	W		L		T	PCT
North Division
No. 11 Washington State ‍†‍‍^{y}	15	–	1	–	0	.938	35	–	8	–	1	.807
Oregon ‍‍‍	8	–	9	–	0	.471	21	–	18	–	0	.538
Washington ‍‍‍	6	–	10	–	0	.375	20	–	16	–	0	.556
Oregon State ‍‍‍	4	–	13	–	0	.235	18	–	17	–	0	.514
California Intercollegiate Baseball Association
No. 3 USC ‍†‍‍^{y}	16	–	4	–	0	.800	42	–	9	–	0	.824
California ‍‍‍	12	–	8	–	0	.600	32	–	14	–	0	.696
Stanford ‍‍‍	12	–	8	–	0	.600	26	–	12	–	2	.675
Santa Clara ‍‍‍	11	–	9	–	0	.550	27	–	17	–	0	.614
UCLA ‍‍‍	10	–	10	–	0	.500	35	–	24	–	0	.593
UC Santa Barbara ‍‍‍	6	–	14	–	0	.300	15	–	27	–	0	.357
† – Conference champion y – Invited to the NCAA tournament As of June 30, 1966; Rankings from Collegiate Baseball

The 1966 USC Trojans baseball team represented the University of Southern California in the 1966 NCAA University Division baseball season. The Trojans played their home games at Bovard Field. The team was coached by Rod Dedeaux in his 25th year at USC.

The Trojans won the California Intercollegiate Baseball Association championship and the District VIII Playoff to advance to the College World Series, where they were defeated by the Ohio State Buckeyes.

== Roster ==
1966 USC Trojans baseball team
Players
Coaches

#	Pos.	Name	B/T	Height	Weight	Year	Home town
	OF	Sheldon Andrens	L/L	5 ft 7 in (1.7 m)	150 lb (68 kg)	Jr	Los Angeles, California
	OF	Oscar Brown	R/R	6 ft 0 in (1.83 m)	175 lb (79 kg)		Long Beach, California
		William Brown	/	—	—	So
	P	Ronald Cook	/	—	—	Sr
		Joe Cox	/	—	—
		Armando DeCastro	/	—	—	Sr
		Justin Dedeaux	/	—	—	Sr
		John Fodor	/	—	—	Jr
		Doug Gabrielson	/	—	—	Sr
	INF	Buddy Gordon	L/R	6 ft 3 in (1.91 m)	190 lb (86 kg)
		James Harrison	/	—	—
	LHP	John Herbst	L/L	6 ft 3 in (1.91 m)	205 lb (93 kg)	Jr
		Jeff Jameson	/	—	—
		Greg Kritzer	/	—	—
	INF	Pat Kuehner	L/R	6 ft 2 in (1.88 m)	200 lb (91 kg)
	RHP	Ray Lamb	R/R	6 ft 1 in (1.85 m)	170 lb (77 kg)	Sr	Glendale, California
	LHP	Bill Lee	L/L	6 ft 3 in (1.91 m)	205 lb (93 kg)	So	Burbank, California
		Martin Lillard	/	—	—
	OF	Fred Shuey	R/R	6 ft 0 in (1.83 m)	170 lb (77 kg)	Sr
	C	Steve Sogge	/	—	—
	RHP	John Stewart	R/R	6 ft 1 in (1.85 m)	170 lb (77 kg)		North Hollywood, California
	INF	Steven Tanner	L/R	6 ft 3 in (1.91 m)	190 lb (86 kg)	So

Head coach

Rod Dedeaux

Assistant coach(es)

Legend

- (C) Team captain
- (S) Suspended
- (I) Ineligible
- Injured
- Current redshirt

== Schedule ==
1966 USC Trojans baseball game log
Regular season
February (4–1)

#	Date	Opponent	Site/stadium	Score	Overall record	CIBA record
1	February 11	Cal Poly	Bovard Field • Los Angeles, California	9–1	1–0	0–0
2	February 19	San Fernando Valley State	Bovard Field • Los Angeles, California	15–14	2–0	0–0
3	February 19	San Fernando Valley State	Bovard Field • Los Angeles, California	10–5	3–0	0–0
4	February 25	San Diego State	Bovard Field • Los Angeles, California	14–10	4–0	0–0
5	February 28	Long Beach State	Bovard Field • Los Angeles, California	14–10	4–1	0–0

March (15–1)

#	Date	Opponent	Site/stadium	Score	Overall record	CIBA record
6	March 1	at San Fernando Valley State	Matador Field • Northridge, California	6–2	5–1	0–0
7	March 4	at Santa Barbara	Campus Diamond • Santa Barbara, California	7–3	6–1	1–0
8	March 5	Santa Barbara	Bovard Field • Los Angeles, California	10–0	7–1	2–0
9	March 7	at Long Beach State	Blair Field • Long Beach, California	2–0	8–1	2–0
10	March 11	Santa Clara	Bovard Field • Los Angeles, California	4–3	9–1	3–0
11	March 12	California	Bovard Field • Los Angeles, California	6–0	10–1	4–0
12	March 12	California	Bovard Field • Los Angeles, California	6–0	11–1	5–0
13	March 15	Cal State Los Angeles	Bovard Field • Los Angeles, California	5–3	12–1	5–0
14	March 18	at California	Edwards Field • Berkeley, California	4–2	13–1	6–0
15	March 19	at Santa Clara	Buck Shaw Stadium • Santa Clara, California	9–6	14–1	7–0
16	March 19	at Santa Clara	Buck Shaw Stadium • Santa Clara, California	3–2	15–1	8–0
17	March 22	Pepperdine	Bovard Field • Los Angeles, California	13–0	16–1	8–0
18	March 26	Stanford	Bovard Field • Los Angeles, California	3–1	17–1	9–0
19	March 26	Stanford	Bovard Field • Los Angeles, California	0–4	17–2	9–1
20	March 27	Santa Clara	Bovard Field • Los Angeles, California	7–3	18–2	10–1
21	March 29	at Cal State Los Angeles	Unknown • Los Angeles, California	4–0	19–2	10–1

April (11–5)

#	Date	Opponent	Site/stadium	Score	Overall record	CIBA record
22	April 1	BYU	Bovard Field • Los Angeles, California	14–3	20–2	10–1
23	April 2	Pepperdine	Bovard Field • Los Angeles, California	6–0	21–2	10–1
24	April 2	Pepperdine	Bovard Field • Los Angeles, California	11–0	22–2	10–1
25	April 4	vs Cal Western	Unknown • Unknown	5–1	23–2	10–1
26	April 5	vs San Diego State	Unknown • Unknown	1–3	23–3	10–1
27	April 5	vs Pacific	Unknown • Unknown	12–0	24–3	10–1
28	April 6	vs San Jose State	Unknown • Unknown	12–7	25–3	11–1
29	April 6	vs San Diego State	Unknown • Unknown	10–5	26–3	11–1
30	April 12	Cal Poly Pomona	Bovard Field • Los Angeles, California	3–4	26–4	11–1
31	April 15	at California	Edwards Field • Berkeley, California	2–7	26–5	11–2
32	April 16	at Stanford	Sunken Diamond • Stanford, California	3–5	26–6	11–3
33	April 16	at Stanford	Sunken Diamond • Stanford, California	3–2	27–6	12–3
34	April 19	Westmont	Bovard Field • Los Angeles, California	3–0	28–6	12–3
35	April 22	Loyola Marymount	Bovard Field • Los Angeles, California	4–2	29–6	12–3
36	April 26	at Santa Barbara	Campus Diamond • Santa Barbara, California	1–2	29–7	12–4
37	April 29	Chapman	Bovard Field • Los Angeles, California	2–1	30–7	12–4

May (6–0)

#	Date	Opponent	Site/stadium	Score	Overall record	CIBA record
38	May 3	Santa Barbara	Bovard Field • Los Angeles, California	6–0	31–7	12–4
39	May 6	at UCLA	Sawtelle Field • Los Angeles, California	13–10	32–7	13–4
40	May 7	UCLA	Bovard Field • Los Angeles, California	3–2	33–7	14–4
41	May 10	at Cal Poly Pomona	Unknown • Pomona, California	7–1	34–7	14–4
42	May 13	UCLA	Bovard Field • Los Angeles, California	13–11	35–7	15–4
43	May 14	at UCLA	Sawtelle Field • Los Angeles, California	4–1	36–7	16–4

Postseason
District VIII Playoff (3–0)

#	Date	Opponent	Site/stadium	Score	Overall record	CIBA record
44	May 23	Cal Poly Pomona	Bovard Field • Los Angeles, California	11–7	37–7	16–4
45	May 24	Washington State	Bovard Field • Los Angeles, California	4–3	38–7	16–4
46	May 25	Washington State	Bovard Field • Los Angeles, California	7–4	39–7	16–4

College World Series (3–2)

#	Date	Opponent	Site/stadium	Score	Overall record	CIBA record
47	June 13	vs North Carolina	Omaha Municipal Stadium • Omaha, Nebraska	6–2	40–7	16–4
48	June 14	vs Ohio State	Omaha Municipal Stadium • Omaha, Nebraska	2–6	40–8	16–4
49	June 15	vs Arizona	Omaha Municipal Stadium • Omaha, Nebraska	8–4	41–8	16–4
50	June 16	vs Ohio State	Omaha Municipal Stadium • Omaha, Nebraska	5–1	42–8	16–4
51	June 17	vs Ohio State	Omaha Municipal Stadium • Omaha, Nebraska	0–1	42–9	16–4

== Awards and honors ==
Shelly Andrens

- Honorable Mention All-CIBA

Oscar Brown

- Second Team All-American The Sports Network
- First Team All-CIBA

Armando DeCastro

- Honorable Mention All-CIBA

Justin Dedeaux

- Second Team All-CIBA

Pat Harrison

- Second Team All-CIBA

John Herbst

- Honorable Mention All-CIBA

Fred Shuey

- Second Team All-CIBA

Steve Sogge

- Second Team All-American The Sports Network
- First Team All-CIBA

John Stewart

- Second Team All-American American Baseball Coaches Association
- College World Series All-Tournament Team
- First Team All-CIBA
