= New Mexico State Aggies baseball =

New Mexico State Aggies
- 2026 New Mexico State Aggies baseball team
- University: New Mexico State University
- Head coach: Jake Angier (3rd season)
- Conference: C-USA
- Location: Las Cruces, New Mexico
- Home stadium: Presley Askew Field (Capacity: 1,000)
- Nickname: Aggies
- Colors: Crimson and white

NCAA tournament appearances
- 2002, 2003, 2012, 2018, 2022

Conference tournament champions
- Sun Belt: 2002; WAC: 2018, 2022

Conference regular season champions
- WAC: 2012, 2019

The New Mexico State Aggies baseball team represents New Mexico State University, which is located in Las Cruces, New Mexico. The Aggies are an NCAA Division I college baseball program that competes in the Conference USA. They began competing in Division I in 1962 and joined C-USA before the 2024 season.

The New Mexico State Aggies play all home games on campus at Presley Askew Field. The Aggies have played in four NCAA tournaments. Over their 15 seasons in the Western Athletic Conference, they have won two WAC regular season titles and one WAC Tournament.

Since the program's inception, 5 Aggies have gone on to play in Major League Baseball. A total of 64 Aggies have been drafted, including Joey Ortiz who was selected in the fourth round of the 2019 Major League Baseball draft.

== Conference Membership History ==
- 1962–1970: Independent
- 1971–1983: Missouri Valley Conference
- 1984–1991: Independent
- 1992–2000: Big West Conference
- 2001–2005: Sun Belt Conference
- 2006–present: Western Athletic Conference

== Presley Askew Field ==
Presley Askew Field is a baseball stadium on the New Mexico State campus in Las Cruces, New Mexico that seats 1,000 people. It opened in 1981. A record attendance of 1,615 was set on February 27, 2015, during the home opener against Incarnate Word.

== Head coaches ==
Records taken from the 2020 NMSU baseball media guide.

Season	Coach	Years	Record	Pct.
1962–1965	Presley Askew	4	42–69–3	.378
1966–1968	Pat Ryan	3	23–59	.280
1969–1982	Jim Kwasny	14	300–380	.441
1983–1986	Curt Cook	4	78–104	.429
1987	Sal Gonzalez	1	20–34	.370
1988	Mike Ryan	1	38–18	.679
1989–1996	Elliott Avent	8	225–213	.514
1997–2000	Rocky Ward	4	81–136	.373
2001–2002	Gary Ward	2	69–48	.590
2003–2014	Rocky Ward	12	374–322–2	.537
2015–2019	Brian Green	5	158–122–1	.564
2020–2023	Mike Kirby	2	32–38	.457
Totals	11 coaches	60 seasons	1,440–1,543–6	.483

== Year-By-Year Results ==
Records taken from the 2020 NMSU baseball media guide.

Statistics overview
Season	Coach	Overall	Conference	Standing	Postseason
Independent (1962–1970)
1962	Presley Askew	10–14–1			
1963	Presley Askew	13–13–1			
1964	Presley Askew	11–27			
1965	Presley Askew	8–15–1			
1966	Pat Ryan	11–17			
1967	Pat Ryan	5–22			
1968	Pat Ryan	7–20			
1969	Jim Kwasny	9–27			
1970	Jim Kwasny	18–26			
Missouri Valley Conference (1971–1983)
1971	Jim Kwasny	23–24		3rd	
1972	Jim Kwasny	32–18		3rd	
1973	Jim Kwasny	14–41		7th	
1974	Jim Kwasny	18–35		5th	
1975	Jim Kwasny	23–18		4th	
1976	Jim Kwasny	19–24		4th	
1977	Jim Kwasny	19–30		5th	
1978	Jim Kwasny	28–23		4th	
1979	Jim Kwasny	26–27		5th	
1980	Jim Kwasny	30–27		6th	
1981	Jim Kwasny	18–33	3–13	6th	
1982	Jim Kwasny	23–27	0–12	7th	
1983	Curt Cook	17–20	0–8	7th	
Independent (1984–1991)
1984	Curt Cook	23–33			
1985	Curt Cook	18–25			
1986	Curt Cook	20–26			
1986	Sal Gonzalez	20–34			
1988	Mike Ryan	38–18			
1989	Elliott Avent	34–22			
1990	Elliott Avent	40–19			
1991	Elliott Avent	22–36			
Big West Conference (1992–2000)
1992	Elliott Avent	20–33	6–18	T-8th	
1993	Elliott Avent	31–23	9–12	T-4th	
1994	Elliott Avent	21–31	4–17	8th	
1995	Elliott Avent	32–22	9–12	5th	
1996	Elliott Avent	25–27	8–13	T-5th	
1997	Rocky Ward	21–33	8–22	T-7th	
1998	Rocky Ward	23–29	8–21	7th	
1999	Rocky Ward	18–38	7–23	8th	
2000	Rocky Ward	19–36	4–26	8th	
Sun Belt Conference (2001–2005)
2001	Gary Ward	32–23	9–17	10th	
2002	Gary Ward	37–25	10–14	6th	Sun Belt Tournament; Tempe Regional
2003	Rocky Ward	43–18	15–9	T-2nd	Sun Belt Tournament; Tempe Regional
2004	Rocky Ward	33–25–1	12–12	T-5th	Sun Belt Tournament
2005	Rocky Ward	28–29	13–11	5th	Sun Belt Tournament
Western Athletic Conference (2006–present)
2006	Rocky Ward	19–36	6–18	7th	
2007	Rocky Ward	22–34	6–18	7th	
2008	Rocky Ward	28–33	15–17	5th	WAC Tournament
2009	Rocky Ward	44–17	12–12	T-3rd	WAC Tournament
2010	Rocky Ward	36–23–1	14–9–1	T-2nd	WAC Tournament
2011	Rocky Ward	34–24	9–15	6th	WAC Tournament
2012	Rocky Ward	35–24	11–7	T-1st	WAC tournament Tucson Regional
2013	Rocky Ward	29–28	13–14	T-6th	WAC tournament
2014	Rocky Ward	23–31	11–13	7th	WAC tournament
2015	Brian Green	11–38–1	7–19–1	8th	
2016	Brian Green	34–23	20–7	2nd	WAC tournament
2017	Brian Green	35–22	19–5	2nd	WAC tournament
2018	Brian Green	40–22	17–7	T-2nd	WAC tournament Lubbock Regional
2019	Brian Green	38–17	19–8	T-1st	WAC tournament
2020	Mike Kirby	12–4			Season cancelled on March 18 due to Coronavirus pandemic
Total:		1,420–1,509–6			
National champion Postseason invitational champion Conference regular season champion Conference regular season and conference tournament champion Division regular season champion Division regular season and conference tournament champion Conference tournament champion

== NCAA tournament History ==
- The NCAA Division I baseball tournament started in 1947.
- The format of the tournament has changed through the years.

Year	Record	Pct	Notes
2002	0–2	.000	Eliminated by San Diego in Tempe Regional
2003	1–2	.333	Eliminated by UNLV in Tempe Regional
2012	0–2	.000	Eliminated by Missouri in Tucson Regional
2018	0–2	.000	Eliminated by Kent State in Lubbock Regional
2022	0–2	.000	Eliminated by Vanderbilt in Corvallis Regional
Totals	1–10	.091	

== Awards and honors ==
- 12 Patriots have been named to an NCAA-recognized All-America team.
- Over their 15 seasons in the Western Athletic Conference, 26 different Patriots have been named to the all-conference first-team.

=== All-Americans ===
Year	Position	Name	Team	Selector
1980	OF	Kevin Wilner	3rd	NCAA
2002	OF	Ryan Kenning	1st	NCBWA
2002	DH	Gabe Veloz	1st	CB
2003	1B	Billy Becher	1st	NCBWA
2003	1B	Billy Becher	3rd	BA
2004	1B	Billy Becher	1st	NCBWA
2004	1B	Billy Becher	3rd	BA
2009	SS	Bryan Marquez	1st	ABCA
2009	SS	Bryan Marquez	2nd	NCBWA
2016	OF	Daniel Johnson	3rd	ABCA
2017	C	Mason Fishback	2nd	CB
2018	P	Jonathan Groff	2nd	CB
2019	2B	Nick Gonzales	1st	ABCA
2019	2B	Nick Gonzales	1st	CB
2019	2B	Nick Gonzales	2nd	BA
2019	2B	Nick Gonzales	2nd	NCBWA
2019	SS	Joey Ortiz	1st	CB
2019	SS	Joey Ortiz	2nd	ABCA
2019	SS	Joey Ortiz	2nd	NCBWA
2019	1B	Tristan Peterson	1st	CB
2019	1B	Tristan Peterson	3rd	NCBWA
2019	OF	Tristen Carranza	2nd	NCBWA
2019	OF	Tristen Carranza	3rd	ABCA

=== Freshman First-Team All-Americans ===
Year	Position	Name	Selector
2016	P	Kyle Bradish	CB

=== Western Athletic Conference Player of the Year ===
Year	Position	Name
2016	OF	Daniel Johnson
2019	SS	Joey Ortiz

=== Western Athletic Conference Pitcher of the Year ===
Year	Handedness	Name
2018	Left	Jonathan Groff

=== Western Athletic Conference Freshman of the Year ===
Year	Position	Name
2018	2B	Nick Gonzales

=== Sun Belt Conference Player of the Year ===
Year	Position	Name
2003	1B	Billy Becher

=== Sun Belt Conference Freshman of the Year ===
Year	Position	Name
2005	1B	Luke Hopkins

=== Sun Belt Conference Newcomer of the Year ===
Year	Position	Name
2003	1B	Billy Becher
2004	2B	Xardiel Cotto

Taken from the 2020 NMSU baseball media guide. Updated February 28, 2020.

== Aggies in the Major Leagues ==
= All-Star	= Baseball Hall of Famer

Athlete	Years in MLB	MLB teams
Jerry Hinsley	1964, 1967	New York Mets
Fernando Ramsey	1992	Chicago Cubs
Mark Acre	1994–1997	Oakland Athletics
Jason Rakers	1998–2000	Cleveland Indians, Kansas City Royals
Tyler Sturdevant	2016	Tampa Bay Rays
Joey Ortiz	2023-present	Baltimore Orioles, Milwaukee Brewers
Nick Gonzales	2023-present	

Taken from the 2020 NMSU baseball media guide. Updated February 28, 2020.

== See also ==
- List of NCAA Division I baseball programs
