= 1966 NCAA University Division baseball rankings =

1966 NCAA University Division baseball season

Tournament

College World Series
- Champions: Ohio State
- Runners-up: Oklahoma State
- MOP: Steve Arlin (Ohio State)

Seasons
- ← 1965 1967 →

The following poll makes up the 1966 NCAA University Division baseball rankings. Collegiate Baseball Newspaper published its first human poll of the top 20 teams in college baseball in 1957, and expanded to rank the top 30 teams in 1961.

== Collegiate Baseball ==
Currently, only the final poll from the 1966 season is available.

Rank	Team
1	Ohio State
2	Oklahoma State
3	USC
4	St. John's
5	Arizona
6	Texas
7	North Carolina
8	Northeastern
9	Florida State
10	Western Michigan
11	Washington State
12	Fresno State
13	Cal Poly Pomona
14	Saint Louis
15	Seton Hall
16	Minnesota
17	Arizona State
18	Idaho
19	UMass
20	Colby
21	Michigan
22	Chapman
23	Ohio
24	Southern Connecticut
25	Boston College
26	Mississippi State
27	Clemson
28	East Carolina
29	Lafayette
30	Rutgers
