= Harry Hess (disambiguation) =

Harry Hess (born 1968) is a Canadian singer and guitarist.

Harry Hess may also refer to:

- Harry Hammond Hess (1906–1969), American geologist and United States Navy officer during World War II
- Harry Hess (American football), American college football coach

== See also ==
- Harold Hess (1895–1982), American college football and basketball coach
