= Mike Kirby =

American baseball coach

Biographical details
- Education: California State University, Fullerton ('94)

Playing career
- 1988–1989: Cerritos
- 1990–1991: Long Beach State

Coaching career (HC unless noted)
- 1991–1995: Cal State Fullerton (assistant)
- 1996: Los Angeles CC (assistant)
- 1997–1999: Cal State Fullerton (assistant)
- 2008–2010: UNLV (assistant)
- 2011–2013: Oregon (assistant)
- 2012–2014: Cal State Fullerton (assistant)
- 2015–2019: Nebraska (assistant)
- 2020–2023: New Mexico State

Head coaching record
- Overall: 56–79
- Tournaments: NCAA: 0–2

Accomplishments and honors

Championships
- WAC Tournament (2022)

Mike Kirby is an American baseball coach who served as the head baseball coach at New Mexico State University. Kirby attended college at Cerritos College and California State University, Long Beach, playing on the school college baseball team at both schools. Kirby served as an assistant baseball coach at California State University, Fullerton, Los Angeles City College, the University of Nevada, Las Vegas, the University of Oregon, and the University of Nebraska–Lincoln. Kirby was named head baseball coach at New Mexico State University on June 24, 2019.

== Head coaching record ==
Record table
Season	Team	Overall	Conference	Standing	Postseason
New Mexico State Aggies (Western Athletic Conference) (2020–2023)
2020	New Mexico State	12–4	0–0		Season canceled due to COVID-19
2021	New Mexico State	20–34	16–20	6th	WAC tournament
2022	New Mexico State	24–34	10–20	6th (West)	NCAA Regional
2023	New Mexico State	0–7	0–0		
New Mexico State:		56–79	26–40		
Total:		56–79			
National champion Postseason invitational champion Conference regular season champion Conference regular season and conference tournament champion Division regular season champion Division regular season and conference tournament champion Conference tournament champion
