= Nick Gonzales =

American baseball player (born 1999)

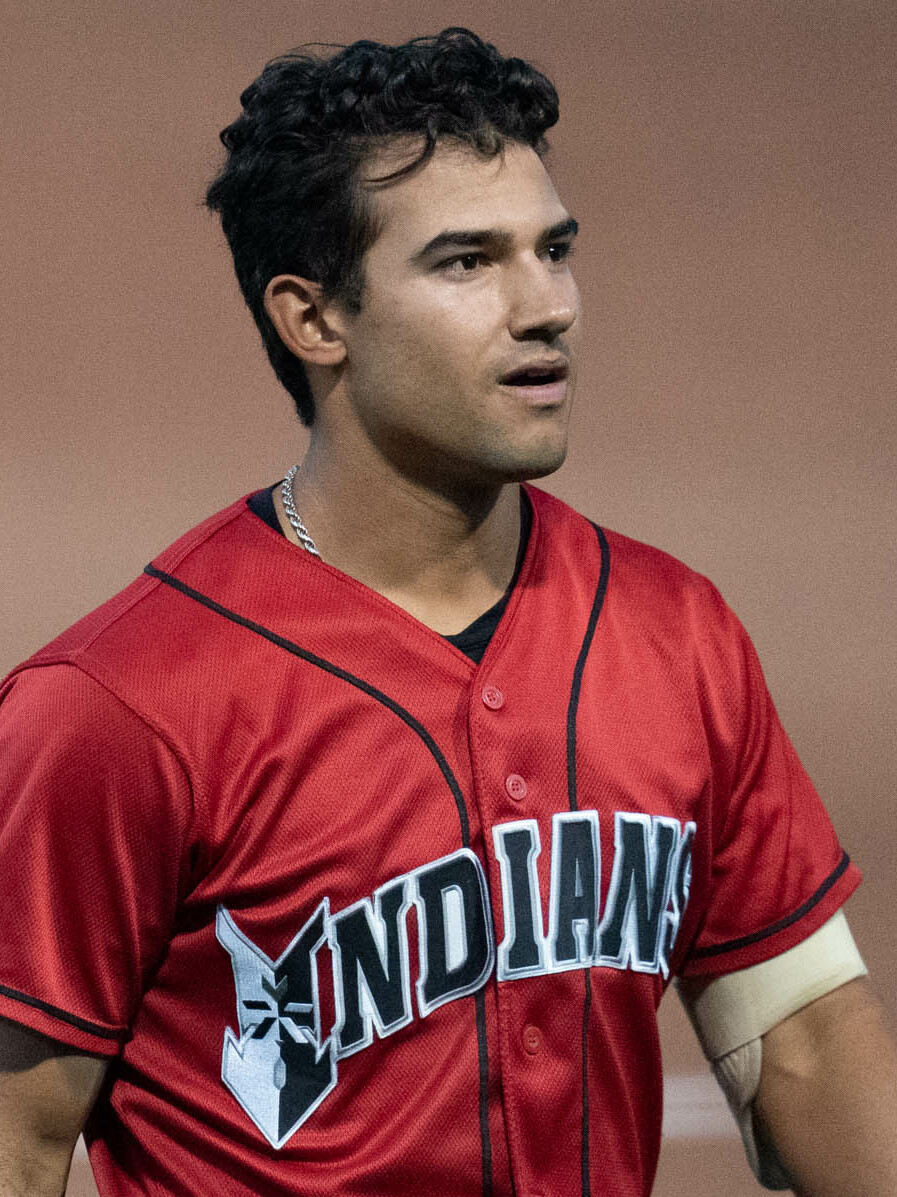
- Gonzales with the Indianapolis Indians in 2023

Pittsburgh Pirates – No. 3
- Second baseman / Third baseman
- Born: May 27, 1999 (age 27); Tucson, Arizona, U.S.
- Bats: Right Throws: Right

MLB debut
- June 23, 2023, for the Pittsburgh Pirates

MLB statistics (through 2026 season)
- Batting average: .275
- Home runs: 20
- Runs batted in: 153
- Stats at Baseball Reference

Teams
- Pittsburgh Pirates (2023–present)

Nicholas Joseph Gonzales (born May 27, 1999) is an American professional baseball second baseman for the Pittsburgh Pirates of Major League Baseball (MLB). He was selected seventh overall by the Pirates in the 2020 MLB draft and he made his MLB debut in 2023.

== Amateur career ==
Gonzales attended Cienega High School in Vail, Arizona. He hit .399 with 89 runs batted in (RBIs) for Cienega's baseball team.

Gonzales enrolled at New Mexico State University and played college baseball for the New Mexico State Aggies. As a freshman in 2018, Gonzales hit .347/.425/.596 with nine home runs and 36 RBIs over 57 games. He was named the Western Athletic Conference Freshman of the Year. As a sophomore in 2019, he led the nation with a .432 batting average. He finished the season hitting .432/.532/.773 with 16 home runs and 80 RBIs. After the season, he played collegiate summer baseball for the Cotuit Kettleers of the Cape Cod League, where was named the MVP of the league after batting .351 with seven home runs over 42 games, and was named to the league's Hall of Fame in 2025.

Gonzales entered his junior year in 2020 as a top prospect for the 2020 Major League Baseball draft. He batted .448 with 12 home runs over 16 games before the season was cancelled due to the COVID-19 pandemic.

== Professional career ==
The Pittsburgh Pirates selected Gonzales in the first round, with the seventh overall selection, in the 2020 Major League Baseball draft. On June 23, 2020, Gonzales signed with the Pirates for a reported signing bonus of $5.4 million. He did not play in a game after signing due to the cancellation of the minor league season because of the COVID-19 pandemic.

Gonzales made his professional debut in 2021 with the Greensboro Grasshoppers of the High-A East, slashing .302/.385/.565 with 18 home runs and 54 RBI over eighty appearances. He missed over a month during the season due to a hand injury. He was selected to play in the Arizona Fall League for the Peoria Javelinas where he was named to the Fall Stars game. Gonzales played for the Altoona Curve of the Double-A Eastern League in 2022, where he hit .263 with 7 home runs and 33 RBI across 71 contests.

Gonzales began the 2023 season with the Indianapolis Indians of the Triple-A International League. In 57 games for Indianapolis, he hit .257/.370/.450 with 6 home runs and 27 RBI. On June 23, 2023, the Pirates selected Gonzales to the 40-man roster and promoted him to the major leagues for the first time. In 35 games during his rookie campaign, he batted .209/.268/.348 with two home runs and 13 RBI.

Gonzales was optioned to Triple–A Indianapolis to begin the 2024 season. On May 9, 2024, he was recalled by the Pirates. In 94 total appearances for Pittsburgh, Gonzales hit .270/.311/.398 with seven home runs, 49 RBI, and five stolen bases.

Gonzales made Pittsburgh's Opening Day roster in 2025, hitting a two-run home run in his first game of the year. Following the game, on March 28, 2025, Gonzales was placed on the injured list with a non-displaced fracture in his left ankle. He was transferred to the 60-day injured list on May 20, and activated on June 3. On June 24, Gonzales recorded his first career 5-hit game against the Milwaukee Brewers with 3 singles and 2 doubles.

== International career ==
Gonzales was called up to play for the Mexico national baseball team at the 2026 World Baseball Classic.
