= 1966 Texas Longhorns baseball team =

American college baseball season

1966 Texas Longhorns baseball

SWC champions

College World Series, 1–2
- Conference: Southwest Conference
- Record: 24–9–2 (9–6 SWC)
- Head coach: Bibb Falk (24th year)
- Home stadium: Clark Field

1966 Southwest Conference baseball standings
	Conf.						Overall
Team	W		L		T	PCT	W		L		T	PCT
No. 6 Texas ‍†‍‍^{y}	9	–	6	–	0	.600	24	–	9	–	2	.714
Baylor ‍†‍‍	9	–	6	–	0	.600	18	–	10	–	0	.643
Texas A&M ‍†‍‍	9	–	6	–	0	.600	20	–	8	–	0	.714
TCU ‍†‍‍	9	–	6	–	0	.600	21	–	9	–	0	.700
Rice ‍‍‍	5	–	10	–	0	.333	14	–	11	–	0	.560
SMU ‍‍‍	4	–	11	–	0	.267	11	–	16	–	0	.407
† – Conference champion y – Invited to the NCAA tournament As of June 30, 1966; Rankings from Collegiate Baseball

The 1966 Texas Longhorns baseball team represented the University of Texas at Austin in the 1966 NCAA University Division baseball season. The Longhorns played their home games at Clark Field. The team was coached by Bibb Falk in his 24th season at Texas.

The Longhorns reached the College World Series, finishing tied for fifth with a first round win over Arizona and losses to fourth-place St. John's and runner-up Oklahoma State.

== Personnel ==
=== Roster ===
1966 Texas Longhorns roster
Pitchers: Gary Moore; Tommy Moore; Catchers: James Scheschuk; Manager: Gordon Lakey	Infielders: Forrest Boyd; Don Johnson; Buddy Young; Outfielders: Joe Gideon	Unknown: Allen John Clements; Raymond R. Dulak; Gary Allen Gressett; Thomas E. Moore; Kelly Scott; Richard B. Summers; Robert Ellis Wells; Minton White Jr.

== Schedule and results ==
Legend
Texas win
Texas loss
Tie

1966 Texas Longhorns baseball game log
Regular season

February/March
Date	Opponent	Site/stadium	Score	Overall record	SWC record
Feb 28	Sam Houston State*	Clark Field • Austin, TX	W 13–8	1–0	
Mar 1	Sam Houston State*	Clark Field • Austin, TX	W 9–3	2–0	
Mar 4	Oklahoma*	Clark Field • Austin, TX	W 13–11	3–0	
Mar 4	Oklahoma*	Clark Field • Austin, TX	T 4–4	3–0–1	
Mar 5	Oklahoma*	Clark Field • Austin, TX	W 10–1	4–0–1	
Mar 8	Texas Lutheran*	Clark Field • Austin, TX	W 9–2	5–0–1	
Mar 15	at Baylor	Waco, TX	W 5–1	6–0–1	1–0
Mar 16	Rice	Clark Field • Austin, TX	W 4–3–	7–0–1	2–0
Mar 19	at SMU	Dallas, TX	W 6–4	8–0–1	3–0
Mar 21	Minnesota*	Clark Field • Austin, TX	W 13–9	9–0–1	
Mar 22	Minnesota*	Clark Field • Austin, TX	W 10–9	10–0–1	
Mar 23	TCU	Clark Field • Austin, TX	L 2–6	10–1–1	3–1
Mar 26	at Texas A&M	Kyle Baseball Field • College Park, TX	L 0–9	10–2–1	3–2
Mar 30	SMU	Clark Field • Austin, TX	W 7–5	11–2–1	4–2
Mar 31	SMU	Clark Field • Austin, TX	W 8–1	12–2–1	5–2

April
Date	Opponent	Site/stadium	Score–	Overall record	SWC record
Apr 7	North Dakota*	Clark Field • Austin, TX	W 16–0	13–2–1	
Apr 12	St. Mary's (TX)*	Clark Field • Austin, TX	W 11–4	14–2–1	
Apr 15	Baylor	Clark Field • Austin, TX	W 6–3	15–2–1	6–2
Apr 16	Baylor	Clark Field • Austin, TX	L 2–3	15–3–1	6–3
Apr 22	at Rice	Houston, TX	W 2–0	16–3–1	7–3
Apr 23	at Rice	Houston, TX	L 5–6	16–4–1	7–4

May
Date	Opponent	Site/stadium	Score	Overall record	SWC record
May 3	at TCU	TCU Diamond • Fort Worth, TX	W 2–1	17–4–1	8–4
May 3	at TCU	TCU Diamond • Fort Worth, TX	W 2–1	18–4–1	9–4
May 9	Texas A&M	Clark Field • Austin, TX	L 5–9	18–5–1	9–5
May 10	Texas A&M	Clark Field • Austin, TX	L 6–8	18–6–1	9–6

Postseason

District 6 playoffs
Date	Opponent	Site/stadium	Score	Overall record	NCAAT record
May 18	Houston	Clark Field • Austin, TX	T 4–4	18–6–2	0–0–1
May 19	Houston	Clark Field • Austin, TX	L 4–5	18–7–2	0–1–1
May 21	at Houston	Cougar Field • Houston, TX	W 9–3	19–7–2	1–1–1
May 21	at Houston	Cougar Field • Houston, TX	W 8–5	20–7–2	2–1–1

Exhibitions
Date	Opponent	Site/stadium	Score	Overall record
June 7	SMI Steelers	Clark Field • Austin, TX	W 7–2	21–7–2
June 8	at Randolph AFB	Randolph Air Force Base • Universal City, TX	W 3–2	22–7–2
June 9	Fort Sam Houston	Clark Field • Austin, TX	W 10–0	23–7–2

College World Series
Date	Opponent	Site/stadium	Score	Overall record	CWS record
June 13	Arizona	Johnny Rosenblatt Stadium • Omaha, NE	W 5–1	24–7–2	1–0
June 14	St. John's	Johnny Rosenblatt Stadium • Omaha, NE	L 0–2	24–8–2	1–1
June 15	Oklahoma State	Johnny Rosenblatt Stadium • Omaha, NE	L 1–6	24–9–2	1–2
