= 1966 Oklahoma State Cowboys baseball team =

American college baseball season

1966 Oklahoma State Cowboys baseball

Big 8 champion District 5 champion

College World Series, 2nd
- Conference: Big Eight Conference
- CB: No. 2
- Record: 21–11 (13–7 Big 8)
- Head coach: Chet Bryan (2nd year)

1966 Big Eight Conference baseball standings
	Conf.				Overall
Team	W		L	PCT	W		L	PCT
No. 2 Oklahoma State ‍†‍‍^{y}	13	–	7	.650	21	–	11	.656
Oklahoma ‍‍‍	11	–	6	.647	13	–	11	.542
Nebraska ‍‍‍	12	–	8	.600	16	–	9	.640
Kansas State ‍‍‍	10	–	10	.500	19	–	14	.576
Iowa State ‍‍‍	8	–	8	.500	9	–	11	.450
Missouri ‍‍‍	9	–	9	.500	13	–	12	.520
Colorado ‍‍‍	9	–	12	.429	14	–	13	.519
Kansas ‍‍‍	3	–	15	.167	8	–	17	.320
† – Conference champion y – Invited to the NCAA tournament As of June 30, 1966; Rankings from Collegiate Baseball

The 1966 Oklahoma State Cowboys baseball team represented Oklahoma State University–Stillwater in the 1966 NCAA University Division baseball season. The Cowboys played their home games at Allie P. Reynolds Stadium in Stillwater, Oklahoma. The team was coached by Chet Bryan in his second season at Oklahoma State.

The Cowboys reached the College World Series, finishing as the runner up to Ohio State.

== Roster ==
1966 Oklahoma State Cowboys roster
- Marvin Fiocchi; - Richard Lynn Frank; - James Hays Jr.; - Gary Lee Howard; - George Keely	Pitchers: - Larry Burchart; - Frank Warrington	Infielders: - Tracy Freeny; - Ronald Chester McCord; - Phillip Lee Spyres; - Robert Toney; Catchers: - Anthony Sellari	Outfielders: - Don Kuykendall; - Alan Johnson; - Wayne Weatherly

== Schedule ==
Legend
Oklahoma State win
Oklahoma State loss

1966 Oklahoma State Cowboys baseball game log
Regular season

March
Date	Opponent	Site/stadium	Score	Overall record	Big 8 record
Mar 21	at Houston*	Cougar Field • Houston, TX	W 11–6	1–0	
Mar 22	at Houston*	Cougar Field • Houston, TX	L 1–10	1–1	
Mar 23	at Houston*	Cougar Field • Houston, TX	W 6–5	2–1	
Mar 24	at Houston*	Cougar Field • Houston, TX	L 0–4	2–2	
Mar 25	at Houston*	Cougar Field • Houston, TX	W 6–1	3–2	

April
Date	Opponent	Site/stadium	Score	Overall record	Big 8 record
Apr 8	Colorado	Stillwater, OK	W 3–2	4–2	1–0
Apr 8	Colorado	Stillwater, OK	W 2–1	5–2	2–0
Apr 9	Colorado	Stillwater, OK	W 7–2	6–2	3–0
Apr 15	at Iowa State	Ames, IA	W 6–3	7–2	4–0
Apr 16	at Iowa State	Ames, IA	W 5–3	8–2	5–0
Apr 16	at Iowa State	Ames, IA	L 0–1	8–3	5–1
Apr 22	at Nebraska	Husker Diamond • Lincoln, NE	L 0–3	8–4	5–2
Apr 22	at Nebraska	Husker Diamond • Lincoln, NE	W 7–0	9–4	6–2
Apr 23	at Nebraska	Husker Diamond • Lincoln, NE	W 4–0	10–4	7–2
Apr 29	Oklahoma	Stillwater, OK	L 4–6	10–5	7–3
Apr 29	Oklahoma	Stillwater, OK	W 2–0	11–5	8–3

May
Date	Opponent	Site/stadium	Score	Overall record	Big 8 record
May 6	at Missouri	Columbia, MO	L 0–1	11–6	8–4
May 6	at Missouri	Columbia, MO	L 2–3	11–7	8–5
May 7	at Missouri	Columbia, MO	L 0–7	11–8	8–6
May 13	at Kansas State	Tointon Family Stadium • Manhattan, KS	W 4–2	12–8	9–6
May 13	at Kansas State	Tointon Family Stadium • Manhattan, KS	L 2–3	12–9	9–7
May 14	at Kansas State	Tointon Family Stadium • Manhattan, KS	W 9–5	13–9	10–7
May 20	Kansas	Stillwater, OK	W 9–5	14–9	11–7
May 20	Kansas	Stillwater, OK	W 10–1	15–9	12–7
May 21	Kansas	Stillwater, OK	W 8–1	16–9	13–7

Postseason

NCAA District 5 playoff
Date	Opponent	Site/stadium	Score	Overall record	NCAAT record
June 2	Saint Louis	Stillwater, OK	W 4–3	17–9	1–0
June 3	Saint Louis	Stillwater, OK	W 4–3	18–9	2–0

College World Series
Date	Opponent	Site/stadium	Score	Overall record	CWS record
June 13	Ohio State	Johnny Rosenblatt Stadium • Omaha, NE	L 2–4	18–10	0–1
June 14	North Carolina	Johnny Rosenblatt Stadium • Omaha, NE	W 5–1	19–10	1–1
June 15	Texas	Johnny Rosenblatt Stadium • Omaha, NE	W 6–1	20–10	2–1
June 17	St. John's	Johnny Rosenblatt Stadium • Omaha, NE	W 6–1	21–10	3–1
June 18	Ohio State	Johnny Rosenblatt Stadium • Omaha, NE	L 2–8	21–11	3–2
