= Rocky Ward =

American baseball coach

Biographical details
- Born: April 29, 1964 (age 62)

Playing career
- 1984: Connors State
- 1985: Western Oklahoma State
- 1987–1988: Oklahoma State
- Positions: 3B, C

Coaching career (HC unless noted)
- 1994: Indianapolis (Asst.)
- 1995–1996: Kansas State (Asst.)
- 1997–2000: New Mexico State
- 2003–2014: New Mexico State

Rocky Ward (born April 29, 1964) is an American college baseball coach. He recently served as the head baseball coach at New Mexico State. He was given that position before the 2003 season and left after 2014. In the intervening two years, his father, Gary Ward, worked as the head coach of the Aggies while Rocky assisted.

== Playing career ==
Ward first enrolled at Connors State, which compiled at 72–13 record in 1985. He then played one season at Western Oklahoma State before completing his eligibility at Oklahoma State while playing for his father. In his two seasons in Stillwater, the Cowboys reached the 1987 College World Series final and amassed a 61–8 record in 1988 and were at the top the Baseball America poll for 12 weeks.

== Coaching career ==
After graduating from Oklahoma State, Ward established the Mid-America Baseball School, and was marketing director and an instructor with the program which helped develop the skills of young players until 1994, when he became an assistant coach at Indianapolis. After one season with the Greyhounds, he moved to Kansas State, where he spent two years as recruiting co-ordinator and worked with infielders and hitters. He earned the head coaching position at New Mexico State beginning in 1997 and completed four seasons before giving way to his father. After two seasons as an assistant, he was again in charge of the Aggies. Since then, New Mexico State has appeared in the NCAA tournament twice and won the Western Athletic Conference regular season title once.

Ward left at the end of the 2014 season as the most successful coach in NMSU history (455), the most All-Americans (10), the most post-season appearances (11), the most NCAA tournament appearances (3). He is now the CEO of Guru Products LLC which provides development and sales for Guru Training Systems based in Belgium. GTS has developed the first artificially intelligent hitting coach, called the Swinguru Hitting.

== Head coaching record ==
The table below reflects Ward's record as a head coach.

Record table
Season	Team	Overall	Conference	Standing	Postseason
New Mexico State Aggies (Big West Conference) (1997–2000)
1997	New Mexico State	21–33	8–22	4th Northern (4)	
1998	New Mexico State	23–29	8–21	4th Northern (4)	
1999	New Mexico State	18–38	7–23	8th (8)	
2000	New Mexico State	19–36	4–26	8th (8)	
New Mexico State:		81–136	27–92		
New Mexico State Aggies (Sun Belt Conference) (2003–2005)
2003	New Mexico State	43–18	15–9	2nd (9)	NCAA Regional
2004	New Mexico State	33–25–1	12–12	5th (9)	
2005	New Mexico State	28–29	13–11	5th (9)	
New Mexico State:		104–63–1	40–32		
New Mexico State Aggies (Western Athletic Conference) (2006–2014)
2006	New Mexico State	19–36	6–18	7th (7)	
2007	New Mexico State	22–34	6–18	7th (7)	
2008	New Mexico State	28–33	15–17	5th (7)	
2009	New Mexico State	44–17	12–12	T-3rd (7)	
2010	New Mexico State	36–23–1	14–9	T-2nd (7)	
2011	New Mexico State	34–24	9–15	6th (7)	
2012	New Mexico State	35–24	11–7	T-1st (7)	NCAA Regional
2013	New Mexico State	29–28	13–14	T-6th (10)	WAC tournament (Note: The top 8 finishers of the WAC's 10 teams qualified for the Tournament in 2013.)
2014	New Mexico State	23–31	12–13	7th (10)	WAC tournament (Note: The top 8 finishers of the WAC's 10 teams qualified for the Tournament in 2013.)
New Mexico State:		260–240–1	98–123		
Total:		455–458–2			
National champion Postseason invitational champion Conference regular season champion Conference regular season and conference tournament champion Division regular season champion Division regular season and conference tournament champion Conference tournament champion

== See also ==
- List of current NCAA Division I baseball coaches
