= 1966 NCAA University Division baseball tournament =

American college sports championship

- Season: 1966
- Teams: 29
- Finals site: Johnny Rosenblatt Stadium; Omaha, NE
- Champions: Ohio State (1st title)
- Runner-up: Oklahoma State (6th CWS Appearance)
- Winning coach: Marty Karow (1st title)
- MOP: Steve Arlin (Ohio State)

The 1966 NCAA University Division baseball tournament was played at the end of the 1966 NCAA University Division baseball season to determine the national champion of college baseball. The tournament concluded with eight teams competing in the College World Series, a double-elimination tournament in its twentieth year. Eight regional districts sent representatives to the College World Series with preliminary rounds within each district serving to determine each representative. These events would later become known as regionals. Each district had its own format for selecting teams, resulting in 29 teams participating in the tournament at the conclusion of their regular season, and in some cases, after a conference tournament. The twentieth tournament's champion was Ohio State, coached by Marty Karow. The Most Outstanding Player was Steve Arlin of Ohio State.

== Tournament ==
The opening rounds of the tournament were played across eight district sites across the country, each consisting of between two and four teams. The winners of each District advanced to the College World Series.

Bold indicates winner.

=== District 1 at Boston, MA ===
Semifinals
**Boston College**	**8**
Massachusetts	5
**Northeastern**	**5**
Colby	4

Finals
Boston College	2
**Northeastern**	**10**

=== District 2 at Princeton, NJ ===
Upper round 1
**St. John's**	**9**
Rutgers	4
**Lafayette**	**15**
Colgate	0
Lower round 1
**Rutgers**	**3**
Colgate	2

Upper final
**St. John's**	**2**
Lafayette	0
Lower final
**Lafayette**	**4**^{12}
Rutgers	3

Final
**St. John's**	**8**	—
Lafayette	3	—

=== District 3 at Gastonia, NC ===
Upper round 1
**Mississippi State**	**4**
Florida State	3
**North Carolina**	**7**
East Carolina	1
Lower round 1
**Florida State**	**6**
East Carolina	4

Upper final
Mississippi State	4
**North Carolina**	**5**
Lower final
Mississippi State	0
**Florida State**	**7**

Final
**North Carolina**	5	**6**
Florida State	**6**	4

=== District 4 at Columbus, OH ===
Upper round 1
**Ohio State**	**13**
Valparaiso	3
**Western Michigan**	**18**
Southern Illinois	4
Lower round 1
**Valparaiso**	**4**
Southern Illinois	3

Upper final
**Ohio State**	**10**
Western Michigan	3
Lower final
**Western Michigan**	**5**
Valparaiso	2

Final
**Ohio State**	**14**	—
Western Michigan	7	—

=== District 5 at Stillwater, OK ===
Finals
**Oklahoma State**	**4**	**4**	—
Saint Louis	3	3	—

=== District 6 at Houston, TX ===
Finals
**Texas**	4	**9**	**8**
Houston	**5**	3	5

=== District 7 at Tucson, AZ ===
Preliminary rounds at Greeley, CO and Laramie, WY.

Quarterfinals
**Idaho**	**3**
Colorado State College	1
**Air Force**	**7**
Colorado State College	6

Semifinals
**Idaho**	**2**	**4**	–
Air Force	1	2	–
**Arizona**	**10**	**4**	–
Wyoming	2	0	–

Finals
Idaho	2	5	–
**Arizona**	**3**	**8**	–

=== District 8 at Los Angeles, CA ===
First Round
**Southern California**	**11**^{10}
Cal Poly Pomona	7
**Washington State**	**5**^{13}
Fresno State	2
Lower round 1
**Fresno State**	**5**
Cal Poly Pomona	4

Semi-Finals
**Southern California**	**5**
Washington State	2
Lower final
**Washington State**	**2**^{15}
Fresno State	1

Finals
**Southern California**	**7**	—
Washington State	4	—

== College World Series ==
=== Participants ===
School	Conference	Record (conference)	Head coach	CWS appearances	CWS best finish	CWS record
Arizona	WAC	39–13 (8–4)	Frank Sancet	7 (last: 1963)	2nd (1956, 1958, 1960)	16–14
North Carolina	ACC	21–11 (12–2)	Walt Rabb	1 (last: 1960)	7th (1960)	0–2
Northeastern		18–6 (n/a)	John Connelly	0 (last: none)	none	0–0
Ohio State	Big 10	22–5–1 (6–0)	Marty Karow	2 (last: 1965)	2nd (1965)	4–4
Oklahoma State	Big 8	18–9 (13–7)	Chet Bryan	5 (last: 1961)	1st (1959)	15–9
Southern California	CIBA	42–7 (16–4)	Rod Dedeaux	9 (last: 1964)	1st (1948, 1958, 1961, 1963)	26–13
St. John's	Metropolitan	23–7 (7–3)	Jack Kaiser	2 (last: 1960)	4th (1949)	1–4
Texas	SWC	20–7–1 (9–6)	Bibb Falk	9 (last: 1965)	1st (1949, 1950)	19–15

=== Results ===
==== Bracket ====
Upper round 1
Texas	5
Arizona	1
St. John's	5
Northeastern	3
Southern California	6
North Carolina	2
Ohio State	4
Oklahoma State	2

Upper round 2
Texas	0
St. John's	2
Southern California	2
Ohio State	6
Lower round 1
Arizona	8
Northeastern	1
North Carolina	1
Oklahoma State	5

Upper final
St. John's	7
Ohio State	8
Lower round 2
Southern California	8
Arizona	4
Texas	1
Oklahoma State	6

Semifinals
Ohio State	1
Southern California	5
St. John's	1
Oklahoma State	6

Preliminary final
Ohio State	1
Southern California	0

Final
Ohio State	8
Oklahoma State	2

==== Game results ====
Date	Game	Winner	Score	Loser	Notes
June 13	Game 1	Texas	5–1	Arizona	
June 13	Game 2	St. John's	5–3	Northeastern	
June 13	Game 3	Southern California	6–2	North Carolina	
June 13	Game 4	Ohio State	4–2	Oklahoma State	
June 14	Game 5	Arizona	8–1	Northeastern	Northeastern eliminated
June 14	Game 6	Oklahoma State	5–1	North Carolina	North Carolina eliminated
June 14	Game 7	St. John's	2–0	Texas	
June 14	Game 8	Ohio State	6–2	Southern California	
June 15	Game 9	Southern California	8–4	Arizona	Arizona eliminated
June 15	Game 10	Oklahoma State	6–1	Texas	Texas eliminated
June 15	Game 11	Ohio State	8–7	St. John's	
June 16	Game 12	Southern California	5–1	Ohio State	
June 17	Game 13	Oklahoma State	6–1	St. John's	St. John's eliminated
June 17	Game 14	Ohio State	1–0	Southern California	Southern California eliminated
June 18	Final	Ohio State	8–2	Oklahoma State	Ohio State wins CWS

=== All-Tournament Team ===
The following players were members of the All-Tournament Team.

Position	Player	School
P	Steve Arlin (MOP)	Ohio State
P	John Stewart	USC
C	Chuck Brinkman	Ohio State
1B	Russ Nagelson	Ohio State
2B	Matt Galante	St. John's
3B	Bob Toney	Oklahoma State
SS	Joe Russo	St. John's
OF	Bo Rein	Ohio State
OF	Ray Shoup	Ohio State
OF	Wayne Weatherly	Oklahoma State

=== Notable players ===
- Arizona: Eddie Leon, Mike Paul
- North Carolina:
- Northeastern:
- Ohio State: Steve Arlin, Chuck Brinkman, Russ Nagelson, Bo Rein
- Oklahoma State: Larry Burchart
- Southern California: Oscar Brown, Ray Lamb,
- St. John's:
- Texas: Gary Moore

== See also ==
- 1966 NAIA World Series
