= 1966 Ohio State Buckeyes baseball team =

American college baseball season

1966 Ohio State Buckeyes baseball

National champions Big Ten Conference champions
- Conference: Big Ten Conference
- CB: No. 1
- Record: 27-6-1 (6-0 Big Ten)
- Head coach: Marty Karow (16th year)

1966 Big Ten Conference baseball standings
	Conf.						Overall
Team	W		L		T	PCT	W		L		T	PCT
No. 1 Ohio State ‍†‍‍^{y}	6	–	0	–	0	1.000	27	–	6	–	1	.809
No. 16 Minnesota ‍‍‍	11	–	2	–	0	.846	27	–	10	–	2	.718
No. 21 Michigan ‍‍‍	10	–	3	–	0	.769	22	–	11	–	0	.667
Michigan State ‍‍‍	8	–	5	–	0	.615	24	–	13	–	0	.649
Indiana ‍‍‍	6	–	5	–	0	.545	17	–	15	–	0	.531
Illinois ‍‍‍	5	–	7	–	0	.417	14	–	14	–	0	.500
Wisconsin ‍‍‍	6	–	9	–	0	.400	9	–	18	–	0	.333
Iowa ‍‍‍	4	–	7	–	0	.364	14	–	15	–	0	.483
Purdue ‍‍‍	2	–	9	–	0	.182	9	–	14	–	0	.391
Northwestern ‍‍‍	2	–	13	–	0	.133	7	–	21	–	3	.274
† – Conference champion y – Invited to the NCAA tournament As of June 30, 1966; Rankings from Collegiate Baseball

The 1966 Ohio State Buckeyes baseball team represented Ohio State University in the 1966 NCAA University Division baseball season. The team was coached by Marty Karow in his 16th season at Ohio State.

The Buckeyes won the College World Series, defeating the Oklahoma State Cowboys in the championship game.

== Roster ==
1966 Ohio State Buckeyes roster
Pitchers: Steve Arlin; Richard Boggs; Curtis Heinfeld; Kenneth Monroe; Keith Stilwell; Ralph Swain; Ross Winning; Catchers: Chuck Brinkman; Richard Marcucci	Infielders: Ralph Copp; James Graham; Bruce Heine; Russ Nagelson; Roger Sexton; Frank Cozze; Outfielders: Robert Baker; Bo Rein; Raymound William Shoup	Position Unknown: John Anderson; Glenn Bergman; Albert Budding; Ronald Dawson; David Dillon; James Elshire; Dennis Jacobs; James LeBay; Wayne Mogan; Gene Zayac

== Schedule ==
1966 Ohio State Buckeyes baseball game log
Regular season
March

Date	Opponent	Score	Overall record	Big Ten record
March 19	at Miami (FL)	10-3	1-0	–
March 19	at Miami (FL)	6-7	1-1	–
March 21	vs. Michigan State	0-3	1-2	–
March 22	vs. Michigan State	7-3	2-2	–
March 23	vs. NYU	15-2	3-2	–
March 23	vs. NYU	11-2	4-2	–
March 25	vs. Army	7-3	5-2	–
March 26	at Miami (FL)	5-0	6-2	–

April

Date	Opponent	Score	Overall record	Big Ten record
April 1	Western Michigan	1-6	6-3	–
April 2	Western Michigan	3-4	6-4	–
April 2	Western Michigan	0-9	6-5	–
April 8	Saint Mary's	4-1	7-5	–
April 9	Saint Mary's	3-1	8-5	–
April 9	Saint Mary's	5-1	9-5	–
April 15	Xavier	14-2	10-5	–
April 16	Cincinnati	2-1	11-5	–
April 16	Cincinnati	3-0	12-5	–
April 22	at Michigan State	2-0	13-5	1-0
April 26	at Bowling Green	0-0	13-5-1	–
April 29	Indiana	7-0	14-5-1	2-0

May

Date	Opponent	Score	Overall record	Big Ten record
May 3	at Kent State	13-1	15-5-1	–
May 6	Wisconsin	8-2	16-5-1	3-0
May 6	Northwestern	15-1	17-5-1	4-0
May 6	Northwestern	9-3	18-5-1	5-0
May 21	Minnesota	6-4	19-5-1	6-0

Post-season
NCAA tournament: District 4 playoffs

Date	Opponent	Score	Overall record
June 2	vs. Valparaiso	13-3	20-5-1
June 3	vs. Western Michigan	10-3	21-5-1
June 4	vs. Western Michigan	14-7	22-5-1

NCAA tournament: College World Series

Date	Opponent	Site/stadium	Score	Overall record
June 13	vs. Oklahoma State	Rosenblatt Stadium	4-2	23-5-1
June 14	vs. Southern California	Rosenblatt Stadium	6-2	24-5-1
June 15	vs. St. John's	Rosenblatt Stadium	8-7	25-5-1
June 16	vs. Southern California	Rosenblatt Stadium	1-5	25-6-1
June 17	vs. Southern California	Rosenblatt Stadium	1-0	26-6-1
June 18	vs. Oklahoma State	Rosenblatt Stadium	8-2	27-6-1

== Awards and honors ==
Steve Arlin

- All-America First Team
- All-Big Ten Second Team
- College World Series Most Outstanding Player

Chuck Brinkman

- All-America Second Team
- All-College World Series Team

Ross Nagelson

- All-College World Series Team

Bo Rein

- All-College World Series Team

Ray Shoup

- All-College World Series Team

== Buckeyes in the 1966 MLB draft ==
The following members of the Ohio State Buckeyes baseball program were drafted in the 1966 Major League Baseball draft.

Player	Position	Round	Overall	MLB team
Russ Nagelson	1B	14th	272nd	Cleveland Indians
Chuck Brinkman	C	16th	318th	Chicago White Sox
