= Wichita State Shockers baseball =

Wichita State University baseball team

Wichita State Shockers
- 2026 Wichita State Shockers baseball team
- Founded: 1899
- University: Wichita State University
- Head coach: Brian Green (3rd season)
- Conference: The American
- Location: Wichita, Kansas
- Home stadium: Eck Stadium (capacity: 7,851)
- Nickname: Shockers
- Colors: Black and yellow

College World Series champions
- 1989

College World Series runner-up
- 1982, 1991, 1993

College World Series appearances
- 1982, 1988, 1989, 1991, 1992, 1993, 1996

NCAA regional champions
- 1982, 1988, 1989, 1991, 1992, 1993, 1996, 2007, 2008

NCAA tournament appearances
- 1980, 1981, 1982, 1983, 1985, 1987, 1988, 1989, 1990, 1991, 1992, 1993, 1994, 1995, 1996, 1997, 1998, 1999, 2000, 2002, 2003, 2004, 2005, 2006, 2007, 2008, 2009, 2013*

Conference tournament champions
- 1980, 1982, 1985, 1987, 1988, 1991, 1992, 1993, 1998, 1999, 2000, 2002, 2003, 2004, 2005, 2008, 2009, 2013*

Conference regular season champions
- 1985, 1987, 1988, 1989, 1990, 1991, 1992, 1993, 1994, 1995, 1996, 1997, 1998, 1999, 2000, 2002, 2004, 2007, 2008, 2010 *vacated by NCAA

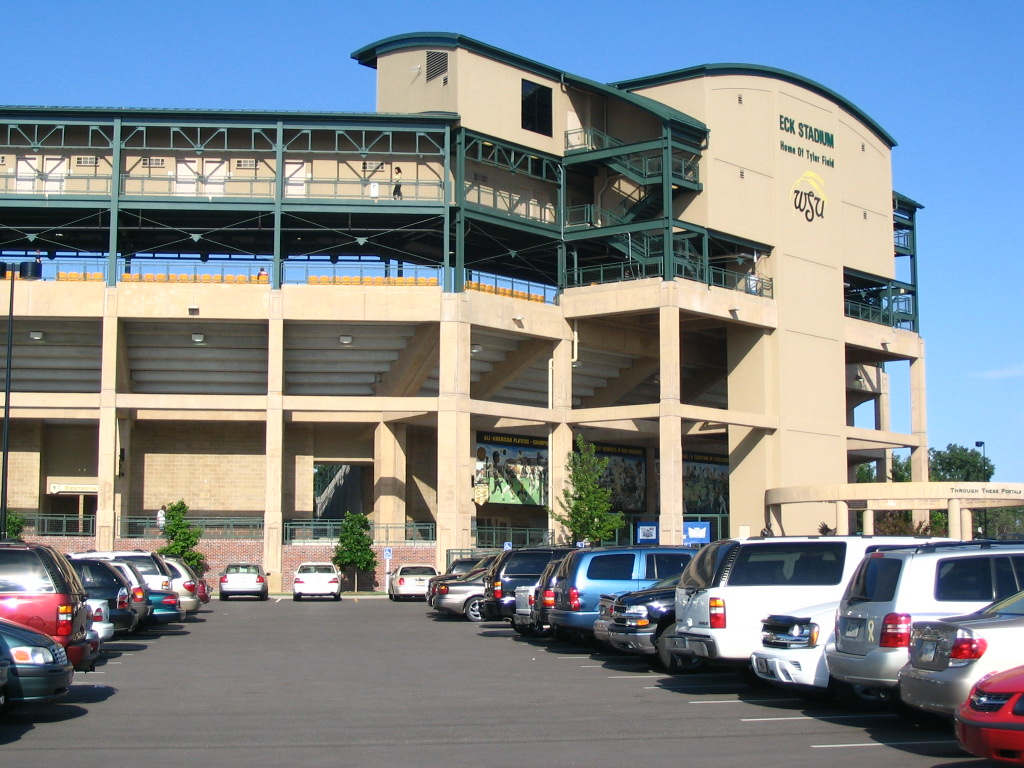
Eck Stadium home of Shocker baseball

The Wichita State Shockers baseball team represents Wichita State University in the sport of baseball. The Wichita State Shockers compete in Division I of the National Collegiate Athletic Association (NCAA) and in the American Conference after 72 seasons in the Missouri Valley Conference.

The Shockers have made the College World Series seven times, winning the national championship in 1989. Wichita State has the eleventh-highest winning percentage in NCAA Division I baseball history at .646. That percentage currently leads the American Conference.

== History ==
=== Early years: 1899–1923 ===
Wichita State, then Fairmount College, played its first college baseball game on April 14, 1899, against Southwestern College. For the first three years, they were coached by Harry Hess, who was also the head football coach at the time.

Over the next two decades, the program would cycle through a number of coaches, none finding particular success or lasting more than 4 years. Wichita would produce two Major League Baseball players during that time in Claude Hendrix and Lloyd Bishop.

After the 1923 season, the baseball program was shut down.

=== Second stint: 1948–1970 ===
Having since joined the Missouri Valley Conference, Wichita decided to re-launch their baseball program for the 1948 season. Over the next 23 seasons, Wichita would struggle through a number of coaching changes and middling success, only once finishing at the top of the MVC's West Division.

After the 1970 season, the baseball program was again shut down.

=== Stephenson era: 1978–2013 ===
The modern era of Wichita State baseball began in 1977, when Oklahoma Sooners assistant coach Gene Stephenson was hired to run the program beginning with the 1978 season. Stephenson had been recruiting coordinator and hitting instructor for the Sooners under Enos Semore and helped lead Oklahoma to five College World Series appearances.

In just Stephenson's third season, led by three-time All-American Joe Carter, Wichita State qualified for the 1980 NCAA Division I baseball tournament, the first tournament appearance in Shocker history. In his fifth season, Stephenson led the Shockers all the way to the 1982 College World Series, where they lost to the Miami Hurricanes in the championship game. Ultimately, the Shockers won 73 games in 1982, setting the NCAA record for wins in a single season. In 1988, Stephenson again led Wichita State to the College World Series before being eliminated by the Arizona State Sun Devils in the semi-finals.

In 1989, led by All-Americans Eric Wedge, Greg Brummett, Mike Lansing, and Mike McDonald, the Shockers returned to the College World Series and won the national championship, defeating the Texas Longhorns in the championship game. To date, it is the only team national title ever won by a Shocker team in any sport.

From 1991 to 1993, led by multi-year All-Americans Chris Wimmer, Doug Mirabelli, and Darren Dreifort, the Shockers made three consecutive trips to the College World Series, finishing as the runners-up to the LSU Tigers in both 1991 and 1993. Wichita State made their seventh and most-recent tip to the College World Series in 1996.

Since 1996, the Shockers have had quite a bit of success, with 12 NCAA tournament appearances, including Super Regional Appearances in 2007 and 2008, but have failed to reach the same heights they found during the 1980s and 1990s. Since 1980, Wichita State trails only Florida State in total wins and winning percentage

On July 11, 2005, Stephenson announced he was returning to Oklahoma as head coach, but decided to return to Wichita State just hours after his introductory press conference, citing concerns with Oklahoma's scholarship situation.

After 36 years, WSU fired Stephenson on June 4, 2013. Stephenson was fired after making the NCAA tournament for a 28th time, though that appearance was later stripped by the NCAA.

=== Post-Stephenson era: 2014–present ===
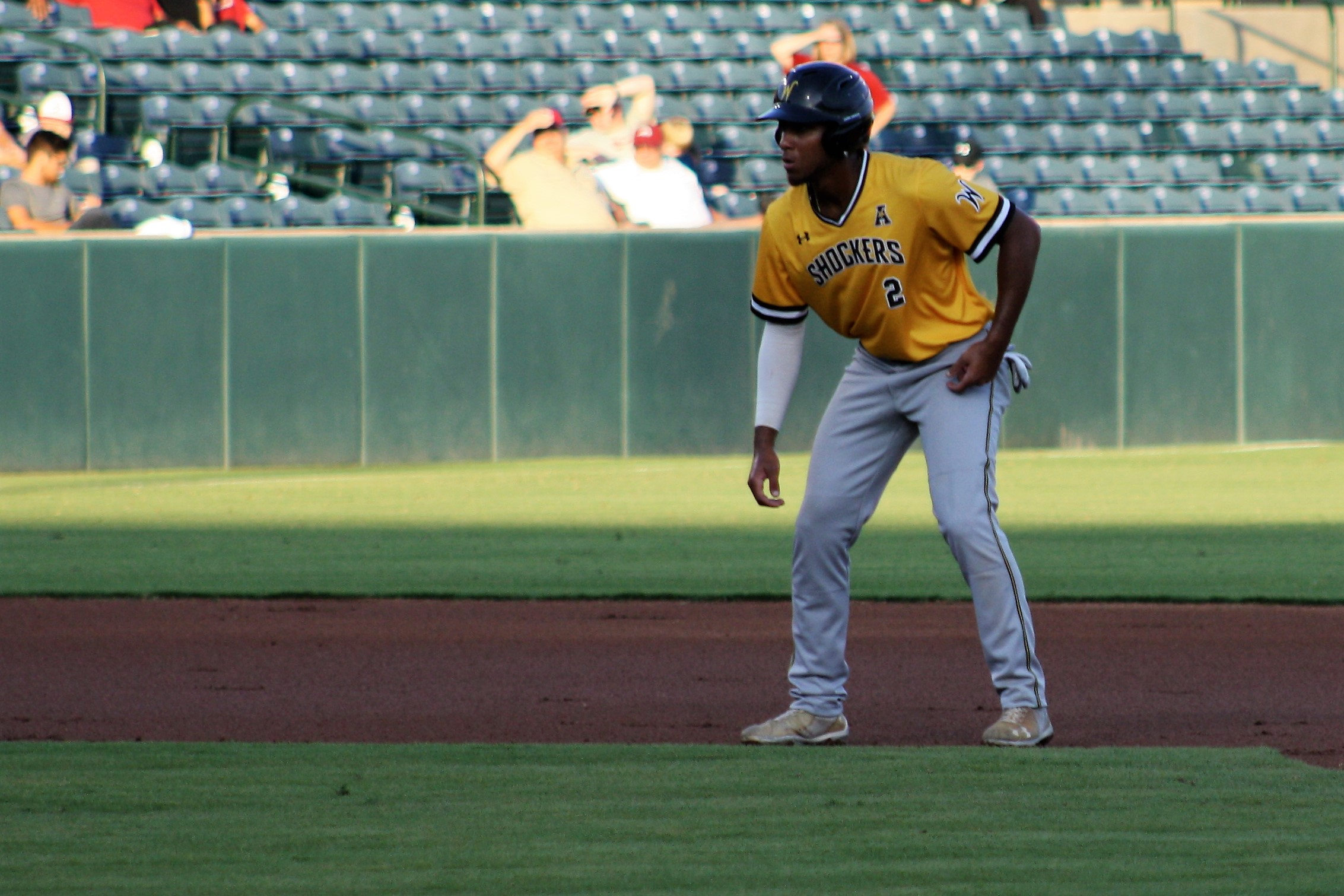
Infielder Alex Jackson leads off second base during a Fall 2018 exhibition game

Todd Butler was hired as just the second coach of WSU baseball's modern era 12 days after Stephenson was fired. Butler had served as an assistant at Arkansas over the past eight seasons. Butler's teams struggled initially, posting losing records in three of his first four seasons, the only three sub-.500 years since Stephenson had restarted the program.

In 2018, third baseman Alec Bohm was drafted in the First Round by the Philadelphia Phillies. The Shockers won 35 games in 2018, the best season under Butler.

Butler was fired following the 2019 season in which the Shockers finished 28–31 after making the semifinals of the American Conference Tournament. Butler finished his six-year tenure with a 169-180-1 record and did not make the NCAA tournament.

In June, 2019, former Shocker All-American catcher, and Pizza Hut Shocker Sports Hall of Famer Eric Wedge was hired as the third baseball coach in Wichita State modern era history. Wedge led the Shockers to a 13–2 season cut short by the COVID-19 pandemic. The Shockers were ranked 30th in the country when the 2020 season was suspended and were a perfect 10–0 at Eck Stadium.

On April 10, 2021, the Shockers hosted the University of Houston in the first game played at Wichita's Riverfront Stadium.

== Head coaches ==
Coach	Years	Wins	Losses	Ties	Pct.
Harry Hess	1899–1901	7	5	0	.583
C. P. Clark	1902	8	4	0	.667
Walter P. Frantz	1904	8	2	0	.800
A. F. Holste	1905	9	6	2	.600
Willis Bates	1906–1908, 1914	37	26	0	.587
Roy K. Thomas	1909–1912	23	19	1	.548
E. V. Long	1913	2	12	0	.143
Harry Buck	1915–1916	3	9	1	.250
Lyle Sturdy	1948	4	4	0	.500
Ken Gunning	1949–1951	9	25	0	.265
Robert S. Carlson	1951	1	4	0	.200
Norvall Neve	1951	2	3	0	.400
Dick Miller	1952–1953, 1961	13	26	0	.333
Forrest Jensen	1954–1955	8	10	0	.444
Jerry Bupp	1956	4	13	0	.235
Ray Morrison	1957–1960	54	44	0	.551
Verlyn Anderson	1965–1970	67	71	1	.486
Gene Stephenson	1978–2013	1798	647	3	.735
Todd Butler	2014–2019	169	180	1	.483
Eric Wedge	2020–2022	65	61	0	.516
Loren Hibbs	2023	30	25	0	.545
Brian Green	2024–present	32	29	0	.525

== Wichita State in the NCAA tournament ==
- The NCAA Division I baseball tournament started in 1947.
- The format of the tournament has changed through the years.
- * indicates appearance was vacated by the NCAA.

Year	Record	Pct	Notes
1980	0–2	.000	Eliminated by Cal in the Midwest Regional
1981	1–2	.333	Eliminated by East Tennessee State in Atlantic Regional
1982	12–2	.857	South Regional Champions; College World Series (2nd place)
1983	1–2	.333	Eliminated by Oral Roberts in the Midwest Regional
1985	3–2	.666	Eliminated by Oklahoma State in Midwest Regional
1987	1–2	.333	Eliminated by Oral Roberts in the West I Regional
1988	6–2	.750	Won the Midwest Regional; College World Series (3rd place)
1989	10–2	.833	Won the West II Regional; College World Series champions
1990	1–2	.333	Eliminated by UCLA in the Midwest Regional
1991	7–1	.875	Won the Midwest Regional; College World Series (2nd place)
1992	4–2	.667	Won the Midwest Regional; College World Series (7th place)
1993	7–2	.778	Won the Midwest Regional; College World Series (2nd place)
1994	0-2	.000	Eliminated by Georgia Tech in the Midwest Regional
1995	1–2	.333	Eliminated by Lamar in the Midwest Regional
1996	4–2	.667	Won the Midwest Regional; College World Series (7th place)
1997	0–2	.000	Eliminated by Alabama in the South II Regional
1998	1–2	.333	Eliminated by Arizona State in the Midwest Regional
1999	2–2	.500	Eliminated by Oklahoma State in the Wichita Regional
2000	2–2	.500	Eliminated by Nebraska in the Minneapolis Regional
2002	1–2	.333	Eliminated by Oral Roberts in the Wichita Regional
2003	2–2	.500	Eliminated by Rice in the Houston Regional
2004	1–2	.333	Eliminated by Arkansas in the Fayetteville Regional
2005	2–2	.500	Eliminated by Tennessee in the Knoxville Regional
2006	2–2	.500	Eliminated by Oklahoma in the Norman Regional
2007	4–3	.571	Wichita Regional Champions; Eliminated by UC Irvine in the Wichita Super Regional
2008	4–2	.667	Stillwater Regional Champions; Eliminated by Florida State in the Tallahassee Super Regional
2009	0–2	.000	Eliminated by Washington State in the Norman Regional
2013*	0–2	.000	Eliminated by Arkansas in the Manhattan Regional

== Individual awards ==
=== National awards ===
- The Sporting News National Player of the Year

Joe Carter - 1981

- Golden Spikes Award

Darren Dreifort - 1993

==== All Americans ====
- 1979

Joe Carter, OF

- 1980

Joe Carter OF

- 1981

Joe Carter, OF
Phil Stephenson, 1B

- 1982

Russ Morman, DH
Bryan Oelkers, P
Phil Stephenson, 1B

- 1983

Russ Morman, 1B
Erik Sonberg, P

- 1985

Kevin Penner, OF

- 1987

Dave Haas, P
Tim Raley, OF

- 1988

Mark Standiford, 2B

- 1989

Greg Brummett, P
Mike Lansing, SS
Mike McDonald, OF
Eric Wedge, C

- 1991

Billy Hall, 2B
Doug Mirabelli, C
Kennie Steenstra, P
Chris Wimmer, SS

- 1992

Darren Dreifort, P
Todd Dreifort, OF
Charlie Giaudrone, P
Doug Mirabelli, C
Scot McCloughan, DH
Chris Wimmer, SS

- 1993

Darren Dreifort. P
Joey Jackson, 2B

- 1994

Shane Dennis, P
Carl Hall, OF

- 1995

Jason Adams, SS
Casey Blake, 3B
Mike Drumrights, P
Braden Looper, P

- 1996

Casey Blake, 3B
Braden Looper, P
Travis Wyckoff, P/OF
Ben Thomas, P/DH

- 1998

Marc Bluma, P
Kevin Hooper, 2B
Pat Magness, 1B
Jeff Ryan, OF
Zach Sorensen, SS

- 1999

Marc Bluma, P
Kevin Hooper, 2B
Pat Magness, 1B

- 2000

Blake Blasi, 2B
Pat Magness, 1B

- 2002

Brian Burgamy, 2B
John Tetuan, P

- 2004

Brandon Green, 3B
Mike Pelfrey, P
Logan Sorensen, 1B

- 2005

Mike Pelfrey, P

- 2006

Aaron Shafer, P
Damon Sublett, 2B

- 2008

Anthony Capra, P
Andy Dirks, OF
Conor Gillaspie, 3B
Rob Musgrave, P

- 2010

Jordan Cooper, P

- 2011

Charlie Lowell, P
Chris O'Brien, C

- 2014

Casey Gillaspie, 1B

- 2018

Alec Bohm, 3B

==== All College World Series ====
- 1982

Tim Gaskell, OF
Loren Hibbs, OF
Russ Morman, DH
Bryan Oelkers, P
Jim Thomas, 2B

- 1988

Mark Standiford, 2B

- 1989

Jim Audley, OF
Greg Brummett, P
Todd Dreifort, P
Pat Meares, SS
Jim Newlin, P
Eric Wedge, C

- 1991

Jim Audley, OF
Kennie Steenstra, P

- 1993

Jason Adams, SS
Casey Blake, 3B

== Current and former major league players ==
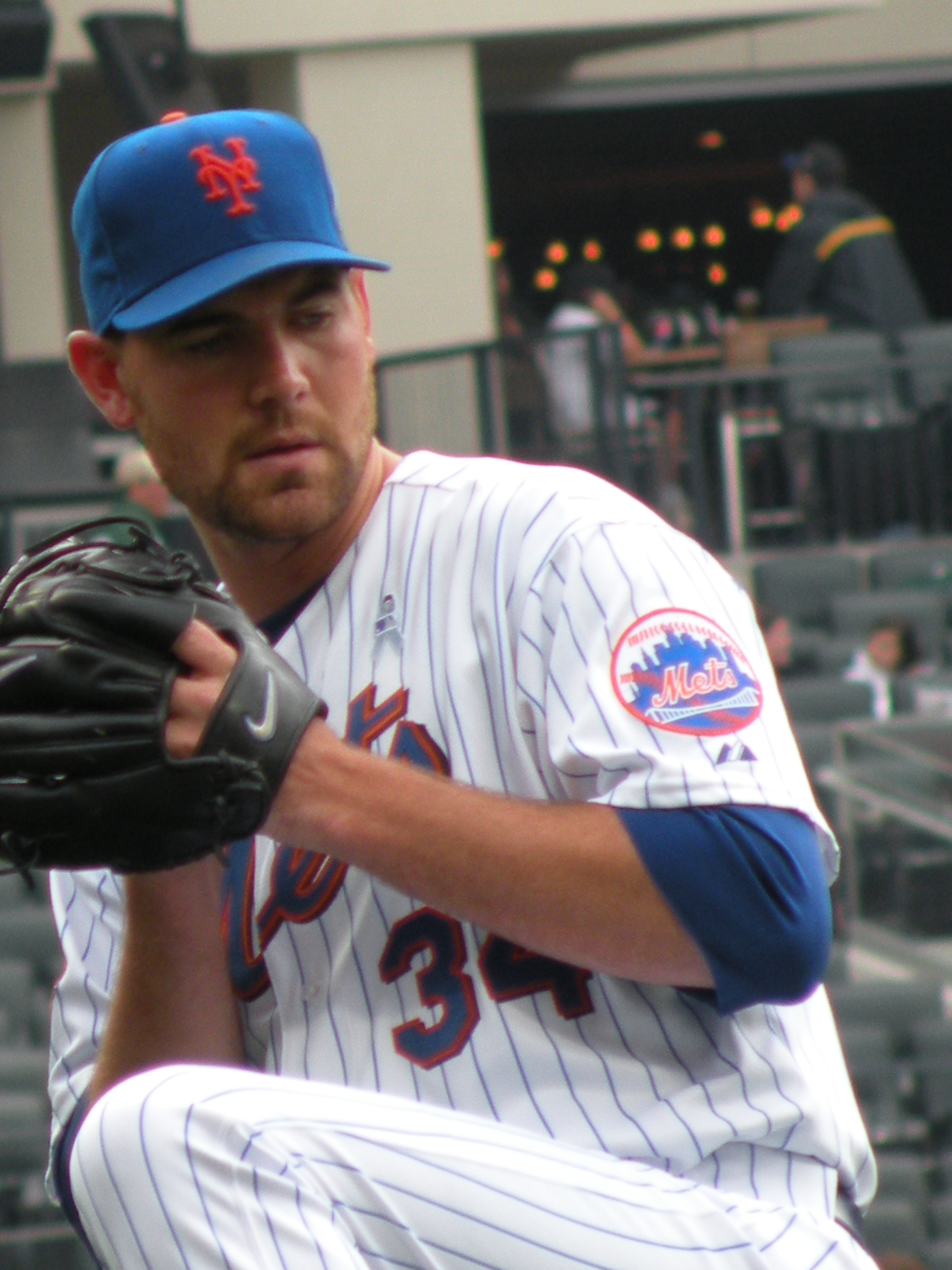
Mike Pelfrey

- Ken Berry
- Lloyd Bishop
- Casey Blake
- Jaime Bluma
- Greg Brummett
- Joe Carter
- Darren Dreifort
- Larry Foss
- Conor Gillaspie
- Tyler Green
- Dave Haas
- Don Heinkel
- Claude Hendrix
- Codi Heuer
- Koyie Hill
- Kevin Hooper
- Kris Johnson
- Mike Lansing
- Don Lock
- Braden Looper
- Pat Meares
- Doug Mirabelli
- Russ Morman
- Bryan Oelkers
- Mike Pelfrey
- Adam Peterson
- Nate Robertson
- Brock Rodden
- Daryl Spencer
- Kennie Steenstra
- Phil Stephenson
- Eric Wedge
- Rick Wrona
- Alec Bohm

Source: Baseball Reference

== See also ==
- List of NCAA Division I baseball programs
