= 1966 Arizona Wildcats baseball team =

American college baseball season

1966 Arizona Wildcats baseball

WAC champions WAC Championship Series champions District VII champions

College World Series, T-5th
- Conference: Western Athletic Conference
- South Division
- Record: 40–15 (8–4 WAC)
- Head coach: Frank Sancet (17th season)
- Home stadium: UA Field

1966 Western Athletic Conference baseball standings
	Conf.				Overall
Team	W		L	PCT	W		L	PCT
Northern
Wyoming ‍‍‍	7	–	5	.583	26	–	25	.510
BYU ‍‍‍	6	–	6	.500	22	–	16	.579
Utah ‍‍‍	5	–	7	.417	19	–	20	.487
Southern
No. 5 Arizona ‍†‍‍^{y}	8	–	4	.667	40	–	15	.727
No. 17 Arizona State ‍‍‍	7	–	5	.583	41	–	11	.788
New Mexico ‍‍‍	3	–	9	.250	23	–	17	.575
† – Conference champion y – Invited to the NCAA tournament As of June 30, 1966; Rankings from Collegiate Baseball

The 1966 Arizona Wildcats baseball team represented the University of Arizona in the 1966 NCAA University Division baseball season. The Wildcats played their home games at UA Field. The team was coached by Frank Sancet in his 17th year at Arizona.

The Wildcats won the District VII Playoff to advance to the College World Series, where they were defeated by the Southern California Trojans.

== Roster ==
1966 Arizona Wildcats baseball team
Players
Coaches

#	Pos.	Name	B/T	Height	Weight	Year	Home town
		Ed Bayne	/	—	—	Sr
		Steve Brasher	/	—	—
		Roger Brautigan	/	—	—
		Terry DeWald	/	—	—	So
		Richard Fleming	/	—	—
		Robert Frisbee	/	—	—
		Larry Gershon	/	—	—	Jr
		Marty Hall	/	—	—
		Robert Hansen	/	—	—
		Gale Kennedy	/	—	—	Jr
23	INF	Ken Kurtz	/	—	—
	INF	Eddie Leon	/	—	—	Jr
		Nyal Leslie	/	—	—
		Donald McMackin	/	—	—	So
		Neil McNevin	/	—	—
		James Nichols	/	—	—	So
		Ezra Neilson	/	—	—	Sr
		Robert O'Brien	/	—	—	So
		Mike Paul	/	—	—
		Hollis Phillips	/	—	—	Sr
		Richard Seminoff	/	—	—
		Eddie Southard	/	—	—
		Jerry Stitt	/	—	—	So

Head coach

45 Frank Sancet

Assistant coach(es)

Legend

- (C) Team captain
- (S) Suspended
- (I) Ineligible
- Injured
- Current redshirt

== Schedule ==
1966 Arizona Wildcats baseball game log
Regular season
February (1–2)

#	Date	Opponent	Site/stadium	Score	Overall record	WAC record
1	February 25	Cal Poly Pomona	UA Field • Tucson, Arizona	5–6	0–1	–
2	February 26	Cal Poly Pomona	UA Field • Tucson, Arizona	10–5	1–1	–
3	February 26	Cal Poly Pomona	UA Field • Tucson, Arizona	0–5	1–2	–

March (16–4)

#	Date	Opponent	Site/stadium	Score	Overall record	WAC record
4	March 4	UCLA	UA Field • Tucson, Arizona	6–3	2–2	–
5	March 5	UCLA	UA Field • Tucson, Arizona	10–8	3–2	–
6	March 5	UCLA	UA Field • Tucson, Arizona	8–9	3–3	–
7	March 11	Pepperdine	UA Field • Tucson, Arizona	17–2	4–3	–
8	March 12	Pepperdine	UA Field • Tucson, Arizona	2–1	5–3	–
9	March 12	Pepperdine	UA Field • Tucson, Arizona	5–1	6–3	–
10	March 18	at UCLA	Sawtelle Field • Los Angeles, California	3–4	6–4	–
11	March 19	at UCLA	Sawtelle Field • Los Angeles, California	10–8	7–4	–
12	March 19	at UCLA	Sawtelle Field • Los Angeles, California	8–9	7–5	–
13	March 21	Oregon State	UA Field • Tucson, Arizona	12–3	8–5	–
14	March 22	Oregon State	UA Field • Tucson, Arizona	9–3	9–5	–
15	March 23	Oregon State	UA Field • Tucson, Arizona	3–2	10–5	–
16	March 24	Oregon	UA Field • Tucson, Arizona	11–3	11–5	–
17	March 25	Oregon	UA Field • Tucson, Arizona	12–6	12–5	–
18	March 26	Oregon	UA Field • Tucson, Arizona	5–4	13–5	–
19	March 26	Oregon	UA Field • Tucson, Arizona	4–3	14–5	–
20	March 28	Wyoming	UA Field • Tucson, Arizona	4–8	14–6	–
21	March 29	Wyoming	UA Field • Tucson, Arizona	10–3	15–6	–
22	March 30	Wyoming	UA Field • Tucson, Arizona	6–0	16–6	–
23	March 31	Michigan	UA Field • Tucson, Arizona	13–4	17–6	–

April (13–6)

#	Date	Opponent	Site/stadium	Score	Overall record	WAC record
24	April 1	Michigan	UA Field • Tucson, Arizona	9–0	18–6	–
25	April 2	Michigan	UA Field • Tucson, Arizona	14–4	19–6	–
26	April 2	Michigan	UA Field • Tucson, Arizona	5–6	19–7	–
27	April 4	Iowa	UA Field • Tucson, Arizona	7–2	20–7	–
28	April 5	Iowa	UA Field • Tucson, Arizona	5–6	20–8	–
29	April 6	Iowa	UA Field • Tucson, Arizona	6–1	21–8	–
30	April 7	Iowa	UA Field • Tucson, Arizona	6–4	22–8	–
31	April 9	Iowa	UA Field • Tucson, Arizona	8–4	23–8	–
32	April 9	Iowa	UA Field • Tucson, Arizona	18–4	24–8	–
33	April 15	at Arizona State	Phoenix Municipal Stadium • Phoenix, Arizona	3–7	24–9	0–1
34	April 16	at Arizona State	Phoenix Municipal Stadium • Phoenix, Arizona	4–1	25–9	1–1
35	April 16	at Arizona State	Phoenix Municipal Stadium • Phoenix, Arizona	5–13	25–10	1–2
36	April 22	at New Mexico	Lobo Field • Albuquerque, New Mexico	6–5	26–10	2–2
37	April 23	at New Mexico	Lobo Field • Albuquerque, New Mexico	10–4	27–10	3–2
38	April 23	at New Mexico	Lobo Field • Albuquerque, New Mexico	3–4	27–11	3–3
39	April 25	Sul Ross	UA Field • Tucson, Arizona	8–9	27–12	3–3
40	April 26	Sul Ross	UA Field • Tucson, Arizona	11–3	28–12	3–3
41	April 29	Northern Arizona	UA Field • Tucson, Arizona	9–3	29–12	3–3
42	April 30	Northern Arizona	UA Field • Tucson, Arizona	10–5	30–12	3–3

May (5–1)

#	Date	Opponent	Site/stadium	Score	Overall record	WAC record
43	May 6	New Mexico	UA Field • Tucson, Arizona	13–3	31–12	4–3
44	May 7	New Mexico	UA Field • Tucson, Arizona	18–2	32–12	5–3
45	May 7	New Mexico	UA Field • Tucson, Arizona	18–1	33–12	6–3
46	May 13	Arizona State	UA Field • Tucson, Arizona	1–0	34–12	7–3
47	May 14	Arizona State	UA Field • Tucson, Arizona	4–5	34–13	7–4
48	May 14	Arizona State	UA Field • Tucson, Arizona	7–6	35–13	8–4

Postseason
WAC Championship (2–0)

#	Date	Opponent	Site/stadium	Score	Overall record	WAC record
49	May 28	at Wyoming	Cowboy Field • Laramie, Wyoming	10–2	36–13	8–4
50	May 29	at Wyoming	Cowboy Field • Laramie, Wyoming	4–2	37–13	8–4

NCAA District VII Playoff (2–0)

#	Date	Opponent	Site/stadium	Score	Overall record	WAC record
51	June 3	Idaho	UA Field • Tucson, Arizona	3–2	38–13	8–4
52	June 4	Idaho	UA Field • Tucson, Arizona	8–5	39–13	8–4

College World Series (1–2)

#	Date	Opponent	Site/stadium	Score	Overall record	WAC record
53	June 13	vs Texas	Johnny Rosenblatt Stadium • Omaha, Nebraska	1–5	39–14	8–4
54	June 14	vs Northeastern	Johnny Rosenblatt Stadium • Omaha, Nebraska	8–1	40–14	8–4
55	June 15	vs Southern California	Johnny Rosenblatt Stadium • Omaha, Nebraska	4–8	40–15	8–4

== Awards and honors ==
Ed Bayne

- All-WAC

Ken Kurtz

- All-WAC

Eddie Leon

- All-WAC
- First Team All-American American Baseball Coaches Association
- All-American The Sporting News

Pat O’Brien

- All-WAC
- Third Team All-American American Baseball Coaches Association
- All-American The Sporting News

Eddie Southard

- All-WAC
