= Brian Green (baseball) =

American baseball coach

Current position
- Title: Head coach
- Team: Wichita State
- Conference: The American
- Record: 83–94

Biographical details
- Born: 1972 or 1973 (age 53–54); Temecula, California, U.S.
- Education: New Mexico State University

Playing career
- 1991–1992: Riverside CC
- 1993: Chapman
- 1994: New Mexico State

Coaching career (HC unless noted)
- 1994: New Mexico State (student assistant)
- 1995–1996: Riverside CC (assistant)
- 1997–1998: Cal Poly Pomona (assistant)
- 1999–2000: Chapman (assistant)
- 2001: Oregon State (volunteer assistant)
- 2002: San Diego (assistant)
- 2003–2004: Hawaii (assistant)
- 2005–2008: UCLA (assistant)
- 2009–2014: Kentucky (assistant)
- 2015–2019: New Mexico State
- 2020–2023: Washington State
- 2024–present: Wichita State

Head coaching record
- Overall: 332–292–1
- Tournaments: NCAA: 0–2

Accomplishments and honors

Championships
- WAC Tournament (2018); WAC Regular season (2019)

Brian Green (born 1972 or 1973) is an American college baseball coach and former player, who is the current head baseball coach of the Wichita State Shockers. He played college baseball at Riverside City College, Chapman University, and New Mexico State University between 1991 and 1994. He then served as the head coach of the New Mexico State Aggies (2015–2019) and the Washington State Cougars (2020–2023).

== Coaching career ==
=== Assistant coach ===
Green served as an assistant baseball coach at New Mexico State University, Riverside City College, California State Polytechnic University, Pomona, Chapman University, Oregon State University, the University of San Diego, the University of Hawaii at Manoa, the University of California, Los Angeles, and the University of Kentucky.

=== New Mexico State ===
Green was named head baseball coach at New Mexico State University on July 31, 2014. Green was about to outline a plan for how he recruits hitters, which he applied during his first season a head coach. Green was about to help flip the Aggies culture quickly when the 2015 graduated 16 seniors, but he was about to recruit 35 players in his first class. Despite finishing second in the Western Athletic Conference in 2017, the Aggies were named the number 1 seed in the 2017 Western Athletic Conference baseball tournament because Grand Canyon University was ineligible for postseason play. On April 10, 2018, Green won his 100th game as the head coach of the Aggies. He had the Aggies clicking during the non-conference schedule, winning 11 of 12 at one point. Green was able to keep the Aggies rolling, turning their hot start into a WAC tournament championship.

=== Washington State ===
On June 3, 2019, Green was hired to become the head coach for the Washington State Cougars baseball team.

== Head coaching record ==
Record table
Season	Team	Overall	Conference	Standing	Postseason
New Mexico State Aggies (Western Athletic Conference) (2015–2019)
2015	New Mexico State	11–38–1	7–19–1	8th	
2016	New Mexico State	34–23	20–7	2nd	
2017	New Mexico State	35–22	19–5	2nd	
2018	New Mexico State	40–22	17–7	T-2nd	NCAA Regional
2019	New Mexico State	38–17	19–8	T-1st	
New Mexico State:		158–122–1	82–46–1		
Washington State Cougars (Pac-12 Conference) (2020–2023)
2020	Washington State	9–7	0–0		Season canceled due to COVID-19
2021	Washington State	26–23	13–17	T–8th	
2022	Washington State	27–26	12–18	9th	
2023	Washington State	29–20	10–16	10th	
Washington State:		91–76	35–51		
Wichita State Shockers (American Athletic Conference) (2024–present)
2024	Wichita State	32–29	15–12	T–3rd	AAC Tournament
2025	Wichita State	20–36	11–16	7th	AAC Tournament
2026	Wichita State	31–29	12–15	7th	AAC Tournament
Wichita State:		83–94	38–43		
Total:		332–292–1			
National champion Postseason invitational champion Conference regular season champion Conference regular season and conference tournament champion Division regular season champion Division regular season and conference tournament champion Conference tournament champion
