= 1966 North Carolina Tar Heels baseball team =

American college baseball season

1966 North Carolina Tar Heels baseball

Atlantic Coast champions District III champions

College World Series, T-7th
- Conference: Atlantic Coast
- CB: No. 7
- Record: 21–13 (12–2 ACC)
- Head coach: Walter Rabb (20th season)
- MVP: Robert Walker
- Home stadium: Emerson Field

1966 Atlantic Coast Conference baseball standings
	Conf.						Overall
Team	W		L		T	PCT	W		L		T	PCT
No. 7 North Carolina ‍†‍‍^{y}	12	–	2	–	0	.857	21	–	13	–	0	.618
No. 24 Clemson ‍‍‍	9	–	4	–	0	.692	20	–	7	–	2	.724
NC State ‍‍‍	7	–	7	–	0	.500	11	–	12	–	2	.480
South Carolina ‍‍‍	7	–	7	–	0	.500	15	–	8	–	0	.652
Wake Forest ‍‍‍	7	–	7	–	0	.500	12	–	12	–	0	.500
Maryland ‍‍‍	6	–	8	–	0	.429	11	–	12	–	0	.478
Duke ‍‍‍	4	–	9	–	0	.308	8	–	16	–	0	.333
Virginia ‍‍‍	3	–	11	–	0	.214	6	–	19	–	0	.240
† – Conference champion y – Invited to the NCAA tournament As of June 30, 1966; Rankings from Collegiate Baseball

The 1966 North Carolina Tar Heels baseball team represented University of North Carolina at Chapel Hill in the 1966 NCAA University Division baseball season. The Tar Heels played their home games at Emerson Field. The team was coached by Walter Rabb in his 20th year as head coach at North Carolina.

The Tar Heels won the District III playoff to advance to the College World Series, where they were defeated by the Oklahoma State Cowboys.

== Roster ==
1966 North Carolina Tar Heels baseball team
Players
Coaches

#	Pos.	Name	B/T	Height	Weight	Year	Home town
		Joe Bailey	/	—	—
		Jon Baylin	/	—	—	Sr
		Bruce Bolick	/	—	—	So
		Bruce Bonczek	/	—	—	Sr
	OF	Charlie Carr	/	—	—	So
		Buddy Cohoon	/	—	—	Sr
		Bill Estes	/	—	—	So
		Mike Flanagan	/	—	—	Jr
		John Hubble	/	—	—	Sr
		Bob Hume	/	—	—
		Tommy Kirkman	/	—	—
		Mike Knowles	/	—	—
		Tom Lampman	/	—	—
		Beattie Leonard	/	—	—	Sr
		Nolan Leonard	/	—	—
		Mike McLaughlin	/	—	—	Sr
		George McRae	/	—	—	So
		Larry Mills	/	—	—
		Tom Robbins	/	—	—	Jr
		L. E. Sawyer	/	—	—
		John Shaw	/	—	—	Sr
		Chip Stone	/	—	—	So
	INF	Danny Talbott	/	—	—	Jr
		Tennant Teeter	/	—	—
		Charlie Thomas	/	—	—	So
		Rodney Thompson	/	—	—	Jr
	P	Danny Walker	/	—	—	Sr
		Butch Watts	/	—	—

Head coach

Walter Rabb

Assistant coach(es)

Legend

- (C) Team captain
- (S) Suspended
- (I) Ineligible
- Injured
- Current redshirt

== Schedule ==
1966 North Carolina Tar Heels baseball game log
Regular season
March (4–3)

#	Date	Opponent	Site/stadium	Score	Overall record	ACC record
1	March 18	at East Carolina	ECU Baseball Field • Greenville, North Carolina	3–5	0–1	–
2	March 23	Springfield	Emerson Field • Chapel Hill, North Carolina	3–1	0–2	–
3	March 25	Virginia Tech	Emerson Field • Chapel Hill, North Carolina	3–2	1–2	–
4	March 26	Virginia Tech	Emerson Field • Chapel Hill, North Carolina	2–4	1–3	–
5	March 29	Yale	Emerson Field • Chapel Hill, North Carolina	15–6	2–3	–
6	March 30	Colby	Emerson Field • Chapel Hill, North Carolina	4–3	3–3	–
7	March 31	Colby	Emerson Field • Chapel Hill, North Carolina	6–5	4–3	–

April (10–5)

#	Date	Opponent	Site/stadium	Score	Overall record	ACC record
8	April 2	at NC State	Riddick Stadium • Raleigh, North Carolina	8–2	5–3	1–0
9	April 4	Connecticut	Emerson Field • Chapel Hill, North Carolina	3–9	5–4	1–0
10	April 5	Connecticut	Emerson Field • Chapel Hill, North Carolina	5–14	5–5	1–0
11	April 7	at Florida State	Seminole Field • Tallahassee, Florida	7–15	5–6	1–0
12	April 7	at Florida State	Seminole Field • Tallahassee, Florida	6–4	6–6	1–0
13	April 7	at Florida State	Seminole Field • Tallahassee, Florida	1–4	6–7	1–0
14	April 11	at Georgia Tech	Rose Bowl Field • Atlanta, Georgia	3–0	7–7	1–0
15	April 15	Clemson	Emerson Field • Chapel Hill, North Carolina	6–1	8–7	2–0
16	April 16	South Carolina	Emerson Field • Chapel Hill, North Carolina	0–1	8–8	2–1
17	April 19	at Duke	Jack Coombs Field • Durham, North Carolina	8–1	9–8	3–1
18	April 22	Maryland	Emerson Field • Chapel Hill, North Carolina	8–3	10–8	4–1
19	April 23	Virginia	Emerson Field • Chapel Hill, North Carolina	3–2	11–8	5–1
20	April 26	NC State	Emerson Field • Chapel Hill, North Carolina	11–4	12–8	6–1
21	April 29	at South Carolina	Unknown • Columbia, South Carolina	1–0	13–8	7–1
22	April 30	at Clemson	Riggs Field • Clemson, South Carolina	6–3	14–8	8–1

May (4–2)

#	Date	Opponent	Site/stadium	Score	Overall record	ACC record
23	May 3	at Wake Forest	Emerson Field • Chapel Hill, North Carolina	4–0	15–8	9–1
24	May 6	at Maryland	Shipley Field • College Park, Maryland	5–2	16–8	10–1
25	May 7	at Virginia	UVA Baseball Field • Charlottesville, Virginia	2–1	17–8	11–1
26	May 10	Duke	Emerson Field • Chapel Hill, North Carolina	10–4	18–8	12–1
27	May 14	at Wake Forest	Ernie Shore Field • Winston-Salem, North Carolina	4–5	18–9	12–2
28	May 18	at Virginia Tech	Tech Park • Blacksburg, Virginia	14–15	18–10	12–2

Postseason
District III Playoff (3–1)

#	Date	Opponent	Site/stadium	Score	Overall record	ACC record
29	June 2	vs East Carolina	Sims Legion Park • Gastonia, North Carolina	7–1	19–10	12–2
30	June 3	vs Mississippi State	Sims Legion Park • Gastonia, North Carolina	5–4	20–10	12–2
31	June 4	vs Florida State	Sims Legion Park • Gastonia, North Carolina	5–6	20–11	12–2
32	June 4	vs Florida State	Sims Legion Park • Gastonia, North Carolina	6–4	21–11	12–2

College World Series (0–2)

#	Date	Opponent	Site/stadium	Score	Overall record	ACC record
33	June 13	vs Southern California	Omaha Municipal Stadium • Omaha, Nebraska	2–6	21–12	12–2
34	June 14	vs Oklahoma State	Omaha Municipal Stadium • Omaha, Nebraska	1–5	21–13	12–2

== Awards and honors ==
Charlie Carr

- First Team All-ACC

Danny Talbott

- First Team All-ACC
- Second Team All-American

Danny Walker

- First Team All-ACC
