= Harry Hess (American football) =

American football and baseball coach

Playing career

Football
- 1895–1897: Kansas

Coaching career (HC unless noted)

Football
- 1899–1901: Fairmount
- 1902: Friends

Baseball
- 1899–1901: Fairmount

Head coaching record
- Overall: 10–11–2 (football)

Samuel H. "Harry" Hess was an American college football and college baseball coach. He was the second head football at Fairmount College—now known as Wichita State University—in Wichita, Kansas, serving for three seasons, from 1899 to 1901, and compiling a record of 10–10–2. Hess was also the head baseball coach at Fairmount from 1899 to 1901. In 1902, he coached football at Friends University in Wichita.

Hess was a pharmacist in Wichita and had played football at the University of Kansas.

== Head coaching record ==
=== Football ===
Year	Team	Overall	Conference	Standing	Bowl/playoffs
Fairmount Wheatshockers (Independent) (1899–1901)
1899	Fairmount	2–1–2			
1900	Fairmount	5–3			
1901	Fairmount	3–6			
Fairmount:		10–10–2			
Friends Quakers (Independent) (1902)
1902	Friends	0–1			
Friends:		0–1			
Total:		10–11–2			
