= 1966 NCAA University Division baseball season =

Baseball season

NCAA tournament

College World Series
- Champions: Ohio State (1st title)
- Runners-up: Oklahoma State (6th CWS Appearance)
- Winning coach: Marty Karow (1st title)
- MOP: Steve Arlin (Ohio State)

Seasons
- ← 1965 1967 →

The 1966 NCAA University Division baseball season, play of college baseball in the United States organized by the National Collegiate Athletic Association (NCAA) began in the spring of 1966. The season progressed through the regular season and concluded with the 1965 College World Series. The College World Series, held for the twentieth time in 1966, consisted of one team from each of eight geographical districts and was held in Omaha, Nebraska at Johnny Rosenblatt Stadium as a double-elimination tournament. Ohio State claimed the championship.

== Season headlines ==
- March 7 – Tulane's Stephen Martin became the first African American to play a varsity sport in the Southeastern Conference, debuting in the Green Wave's season opener against Spring Hill. In later years, Martin would be overlooked as an SEC integration pioneer because he was a walk-on and Tulane left the SEC immediately after the 1966 season.

== Conference winners ==
This is a partial list of conference champions from the 1966 season. Each of the eight geographical districts chose, by various methods, the team that would represent them in the NCAA tournament. 11 teams earned automatic bids by winning their conference championship while 17 teams earned at-large selections.

Conference	Regular season winner
Atlantic Coast Conference	North Carolina
Big Eight Conference	Oklahoma State
Big Ten Conference	Ohio State
CIBA	Southern California
EIBL	Army
Mid-American Conference	Western Michigan
Pacific Coast Conference	Washington State
Southeastern Conference	Mississippi State
Southern Conference	East Carolina
Southwest Conference	Texas; Baylor; Texas A&M; TCU
Western Athletic Conference	Arizona
Yankee Conference	Connecticut; Maine; UMass

== Conference standings ==
The following is an incomplete list of conference standings:

1966 Athletic Association of Western Universities baseball standings
	Conf.						Overall
Team	W		L		T	PCT	W		L		T	PCT
North Division
No. 11 Washington State ‍†‍‍^{y}	15	–	1	–	0	.938	35	–	8	–	1	.807
Oregon ‍‍‍	8	–	9	–	0	.471	21	–	18	–	0	.538
Washington ‍‍‍	6	–	10	–	0	.375	20	–	16	–	0	.556
Oregon State ‍‍‍	4	–	13	–	0	.235	18	–	17	–	0	.514
California Intercollegiate Baseball Association
No. 3 USC ‍†‍‍^{y}	16	–	4	–	0	.800	42	–	9	–	0	.824
California ‍‍‍	12	–	8	–	0	.600	32	–	14	–	0	.696
Stanford ‍‍‍	12	–	8	–	0	.600	26	–	12	–	2	.675
Santa Clara ‍‍‍	11	–	9	–	0	.550	27	–	17	–	0	.614
UCLA ‍‍‍	10	–	10	–	0	.500	35	–	24	–	0	.593
UC Santa Barbara ‍‍‍	6	–	14	–	0	.300	15	–	27	–	0	.357
† – Conference champion y – Invited to the NCAA tournament As of June 30, 1966; Rankings from Collegiate Baseball

1966 Big Ten Conference baseball standings
	Conf.						Overall
Team	W		L		T	PCT	W		L		T	PCT
No. 1 Ohio State ‍†‍‍^{y}	6	–	0	–	0	1.000	27	–	6	–	1	.809
No. 16 Minnesota ‍‍‍	11	–	2	–	0	.846	27	–	10	–	2	.718
No. 21 Michigan ‍‍‍	10	–	3	–	0	.769	22	–	11	–	0	.667
Michigan State ‍‍‍	8	–	5	–	0	.615	24	–	13	–	0	.649
Indiana ‍‍‍	6	–	5	–	0	.545	17	–	15	–	0	.531
Illinois ‍‍‍	5	–	7	–	0	.417	14	–	14	–	0	.500
Wisconsin ‍‍‍	6	–	9	–	0	.400	9	–	18	–	0	.333
Iowa ‍‍‍	4	–	7	–	0	.364	14	–	15	–	0	.483
Purdue ‍‍‍	2	–	9	–	0	.182	9	–	14	–	0	.391
Northwestern ‍‍‍	2	–	13	–	0	.133	7	–	21	–	3	.274
† – Conference champion y – Invited to the NCAA tournament As of June 30, 1966; Rankings from Collegiate Baseball

1966 Atlantic Coast Conference baseball standings
	Conf.						Overall
Team	W		L		T	PCT	W		L		T	PCT
No. 7 North Carolina ‍†‍‍^{y}	12	–	2	–	0	.857	21	–	13	–	0	.618
No. 24 Clemson ‍‍‍	9	–	4	–	0	.692	20	–	7	–	2	.724
NC State ‍‍‍	7	–	7	–	0	.500	11	–	12	–	2	.480
South Carolina ‍‍‍	7	–	7	–	0	.500	15	–	8	–	0	.652
Wake Forest ‍‍‍	7	–	7	–	0	.500	12	–	12	–	0	.500
Maryland ‍‍‍	6	–	8	–	0	.429	11	–	12	–	0	.478
Duke ‍‍‍	4	–	9	–	0	.308	8	–	16	–	0	.333
Virginia ‍‍‍	3	–	11	–	0	.214	6	–	19	–	0	.240
† – Conference champion y – Invited to the NCAA tournament As of June 30, 1966; Rankings from Collegiate Baseball

1966 Southwest Conference baseball standings
	Conf.						Overall
Team	W		L		T	PCT	W		L		T	PCT
No. 6 Texas ‍†‍‍^{y}	9	–	6	–	0	.600	24	–	9	–	2	.714
Baylor ‍†‍‍	9	–	6	–	0	.600	18	–	10	–	0	.643
Texas A&M ‍†‍‍	9	–	6	–	0	.600	20	–	8	–	0	.714
TCU ‍†‍‍	9	–	6	–	0	.600	21	–	9	–	0	.700
Rice ‍‍‍	5	–	10	–	0	.333	14	–	11	–	0	.560
SMU ‍‍‍	4	–	11	–	0	.267	11	–	16	–	0	.407
† – Conference champion y – Invited to the NCAA tournament As of June 30, 1966; Rankings from Collegiate Baseball

1966 Big Eight Conference baseball standings
	Conf.				Overall
Team	W		L	PCT	W		L	PCT
No. 2 Oklahoma State ‍†‍‍^{y}	13	–	7	.650	21	–	11	.656
Oklahoma ‍‍‍	11	–	6	.647	13	–	11	.542
Nebraska ‍‍‍	12	–	8	.600	16	–	9	.640
Kansas State ‍‍‍	10	–	10	.500	19	–	14	.576
Iowa State ‍‍‍	8	–	8	.500	9	–	11	.450
Missouri ‍‍‍	9	–	9	.500	13	–	12	.520
Colorado ‍‍‍	9	–	12	.429	14	–	13	.519
Kansas ‍‍‍	3	–	15	.167	8	–	17	.320
† – Conference champion y – Invited to the NCAA tournament As of June 30, 1966; Rankings from Collegiate Baseball

1966 Western Athletic Conference baseball standings
	Conf.				Overall
Team	W		L	PCT	W		L	PCT
Northern
Wyoming ‍‍‍	7	–	5	.583	26	–	25	.510
BYU ‍‍‍	6	–	6	.500	22	–	16	.579
Utah ‍‍‍	5	–	7	.417	19	–	20	.487
Southern
No. 5 Arizona ‍†‍‍^{y}	8	–	4	.667	40	–	15	.727
No. 17 Arizona State ‍‍‍	7	–	5	.583	41	–	11	.788
New Mexico ‍‍‍	3	–	9	.250	23	–	17	.575
† – Conference champion y – Invited to the NCAA tournament As of June 30, 1966; Rankings from Collegiate Baseball

== College World Series ==
The 1966 season marked the twentieth NCAA baseball tournament, which culminated with the eight team College World Series. The College World Series was held in Omaha, Nebraska. The eight teams played a double-elimination format, with Ohio State claiming their first championship with an 8–2 win over Oklahoma State in the final.

Upper round 1
Texas	5
Arizona	1
St. John's	5
Northeastern	3
Southern California	6
North Carolina	2
Ohio State	4
Oklahoma State	2

Upper round 2
Texas	0
St. John's	2
Southern California	2
Ohio State	6
Lower round 1
Arizona	8
Northeastern	1
North Carolina	1
Oklahoma State	5

Upper final
St. John's	7
Ohio State	8
Lower round 2
Southern California	8
Arizona	4
Texas	1
Oklahoma State	6

Semifinals
Ohio State	1
Southern California	5
St. John's	1
Oklahoma State	6

Preliminary final
Ohio State	1
Southern California	0

Final
Ohio State	8
Oklahoma State	2
