= Oscar Brown (baseball) =

American baseball player (1946–2020)

- Outfielder
- Born: February 8, 1946; Long Beach, California, U.S.
- Died: June 3, 2020 (aged 74); Carson, California, U.S.
- Batted: Right Threw: Right

MLB debut
- September 3, 1969, for the Atlanta Braves

Last MLB appearance
- September 30, 1973, for the Atlanta Braves

MLB statistics
- Batting average: .244
- Home runs: 4
- Runs batted in: 28
- Stats at Baseball Reference

Teams
- Atlanta Braves (1969–1973)

Oscar Lee Brown (February 8, 1946 – June 3, 2020) was an American professional baseball player, an outfielder who appeared in all or parts of five seasons for the Atlanta Braves of Major League Baseball. He is a brother of two other professional athletes: Willie F. Brown, an NFL running back in the 1960s, and "Downtown" Ollie Brown, an outfielder who had a 13-year Major League career. As a player, Oscar Brown threw and batted right-handed, and was listed at 6 ft (1.83 m) and 175 lb (79 kg).

Brown was born in Long Beach, California, and attended the Polytechnic there and the University of Southern California before being chosen by the Braves in the first round of the secondary draft in June 1966.

Brown joined the Braves' roster September 3, 1969. In 160 Major League games, he collected 77 hits, including four home runs, 14 doubles and two triples. His only full season with the Braves was his last MLB campaign, 1973.

Brown died on June 3, 2020.
