= Russ Nagelson =

American baseball player (born 1944)

- Outfielder
- Born: September 19, 1944 (age 81); Cincinnati, Ohio, U.S.
- Batted: Left Threw: Right

MLB debut
- September 11, 1968, for the Cleveland Indians

Last MLB appearance
- October 1, 1970, for the Detroit Tigers

MLB statistics
- Batting average: .211
- Home runs: 1
- Runs batted in: 4
- Stats at Baseball Reference

Teams
- Cleveland Indians (1968–1970); Detroit Tigers (1970)

Russell Charles Nagelson (born September 19, 1944) is an American former professional baseball player. He played in 62 games in Major League Baseball outfielder over three seasons as an outfielder and pinch hitter for the Cleveland Indians (1968–1970) and Detroit Tigers (1970). Nagelson attended Ohio State University, stood 6 feet (1.8 m) tall and weighed 205 pounds (93 kg). He collected 16 hits during his Major League career,
