= Bill Wilhelm =

American baseball player and coach

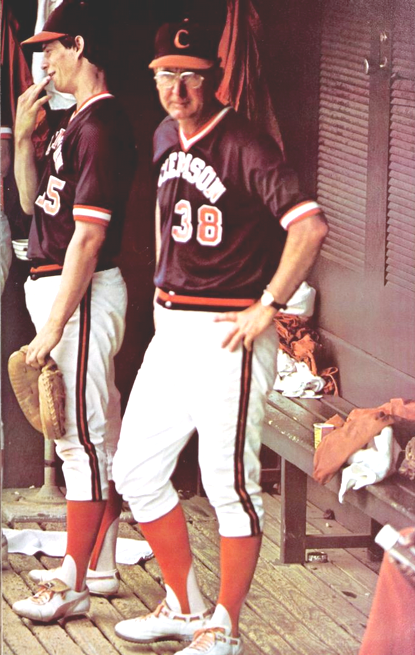
- Wilhelm in 1977

Biographical details
- Born: June 11, 1929
- Died: December 24, 2010 (aged 81); Seneca, South Carolina, U.S.
- Education: Catawba College

Playing career
- 1948–1949: NC State
- 1950: Goldsboro Cardinals
- 1950: Allentown Cardinals
- 1953: Paducah Chiefs
- 1953: Albany Cardinals
- 1954: Columbus Cardinals
- 1954: Allentown Cardinals
- 1955: Jacksonville Braves
- 1956: Atlanta Crackers
- 1957: Greensboro Patriots
- Position: Catcher

Coaching career (HC unless noted)
- 1957: North Carolina (assistant)
- 1958–1993: Clemson

Head coaching record
- Overall: 1,161–536–10 (.683)

Accomplishments and honors

Championships
- 17 ACC Regular season Championships (1958, 1959, 1967, 1973–1979, 1981, 1982, 1984, 1985, 1988, 1991, 1992); 7 ACC Tournament championships (1976, 1978, 1980, 1981, 1989, 1991, 1993); 17 NCAA tournament Appearances (1958, 1959, 1967, 1975–1981, 1987–1993); 6 College World Series Appearances (1958, 1959, 1976, 1977, 1980, 1991)
- College Baseball Hall of Fame; Inducted in 2011

Billy Wilhelm (June 11, 1929 – December 24, 2010) was an American college baseball coach who was the head coach of the Clemson Tigers from 1958 to 1993. In his 36 seasons as head coach, Wilhelm had a record of 1,161–536–10. Before coming to Clemson, Wilhelm played several seasons of minor league baseball and served one season as an assistant baseball coach at North Carolina.

== Playing career ==
Wilhelm played two seasons of college baseball at NC State, and he signed a professional contract with the St. Louis Cardinals organization in 1950, splitting that season between the Goldsboro Cardinals and the Allentown Cardinals. Wilhelm then spent two years out of baseball from 1951 to 1952, when he served in the United States Army in the Korean War.

In 1953, Wilhelm returned from military service and had his most successful minor league season. In 96 games with the Paducah Chiefs of the Class D Kentucky–Illinois–Tennessee League, he batted .291 and hit 14 home runs. After the 1954 season, which he split between the Columbus Cardinals and the Allentown Cardinals, Wilhelm left the Cardinals organization.

Wilhelm played the 1955 and 1956 seasons in the Milwaukee Braves system, advancing as high as the Double-A Atlanta Crackers. He played his final season of professional baseball in summer 1957, with the Greensboro Patriots of the Boston Red Sox organization.

He appeared in a total of 401 minor league games, hitting .212 with 21 home runs.

== Coaching career ==
Prior to his final season of professional baseball in summer 1957, Wilhelm had served as an assistant baseball coach for the North Carolina Tar Heels in spring 1957. In September 1957, Wilhelm accepted the head coaching position at Clemson.

In his first two seasons, Wilhelm led the program to two Atlantic Coast Conference (ACC) championships and its first two College World Series appearances, in 1958 and 1959. In the next 13 season (1960–1972), however, Clemson made only one NCAA tournament appearance, in 1967.

With the start of the ACC tournament era in 1973, Wilhelm began a stretch of 11 regular season conference championships in 13 seasons (through 1985), including seven consecutive from 1973 to 1979. This 13-season period included three College World Series appearances, in 1976, 1977, and 1980.

From 1986 to 1993, the final eight seasons of Wilhelm's head coaching career, Clemson won three regular season conference championships (1988, 1991, 1992), three conference tournament championships (1989, 1991, and 1993), and one College World Series appearance (1991).

Wilhelm's teams had winning records in each of his 36 seasons, and he won a total of 17 ACC Regular season Championships and seven ACC Tournament championships, both ACC coaching records, as of the end of the 2012 season. He also appeared in six College World Series. He coached 27 players who went on to play Major League Baseball.

== Head coaching record ==
The following is a table of Wilhelm's yearly records as an NCAA head baseball coach.

Record table
Season	Team	Overall	Conference	Standing	Postseason
Clemson Tigers (Atlantic Coast Conference) (1958–1993)
1958	Clemson	22–8	11–3	1st	College World Series
1959	Clemson	24–8	9–5	1st	College World Series
1960	Clemson	11–10–1	7–6	4th	
1961	Clemson	12–11	6–8	5th	
1962	Clemson	17–8	8–6	T–3rd	
1963	Clemson	15–11	9–5	T–2nd	
1964	Clemson	13–13	6–7	T–4th	
1965	Clemson	18–10–2	9–5	2nd	
1966	Clemson	20–7–2	9–4	2nd	
1967	Clemson	29–9	11–2	1st	NCAA Regional
1968	Clemson	27–14	11–7	4th	
1969	Clemson	27–17–2	12–8–1	3rd	
1970	Clemson	32–16	14–7	2nd	
1971	Clemson	27–14	10–4	2nd	
1972	Clemson	19–15	6–7	5th	
1973	Clemson	24–16	10–2	T–1st	ACC tournament (Note: In this season, all members of the Atlantic Coast Conference qualified for the conference tournament.)
1974	Clemson	23–15	10–1	1st	ACC tournament
1975	Clemson	33–10	10–2	T–1st	NCAA Regional
1976	Clemson	36–15	10–2	1st	College World Series
1977	Clemson	42–10	9–1	1st	College World Series
1978	Clemson	39–14	10–2	1st	NCAA Regional
1979	Clemson	40–15	10–1	1st	NCAA Regional
1980	Clemson	38–21	6–5	3rd	College World Series
1981	Clemson	34–24	10–4	T–1st	NCAA Regional
1982	Clemson	37–22	10–2	1st	ACC tournament
1983	Clemson	30–20–1	6–5	3rd	ACC tournament
1984	Clemson	38–17	12–2	T–1st	ACC tournament
1985	Clemson	36–30–1	9–4	T–1st	ACC tournament
1986	Clemson	42–21	9–4	3rd	ACC tournament
1987	Clemson	54–14–1	16–5	2nd	NCAA Regional
1988	Clemson	54–14	18–2	1st	NCAA Regional
1989	Clemson	50–20	13–5	2nd	NCAA Regional
1990	Clemson	43–23	14–6	2nd	NCAA Regional
1991	Clemson	60–10	18–3	1st	College World Series
1992	Clemson	50–14	19–5	1st	NCAA Regional
1993	Clemson	45–20	11–11	5th	NCAA Regional
Total:		1,161–536–10 (.683)			
National champion Postseason invitational champion Conference regular season champion Conference regular season and conference tournament champion Division regular season champion Division regular season and conference tournament champion Conference tournament champion

== Death and posthumous awards ==
Wilhelm died at the age of 81 on December 24, 2010, in Seneca, South Carolina. Following his death, he was inducted into the National College Baseball Hall of Fame in 2011 and the South Carolina Athletic Hall of Fame in 2012.

== See also ==
- List of college baseball career coaching wins leaders
