= 1987 Atlantic Coast Conference baseball tournament =

American college baseball tournament

- Teams: 8
- Format: Eight-team double elimination
- Finals site: Greenville Municipal Stadium; Greenville, South Carolina
- Champions: Georgia Tech (3rd title)
- Winning coach: Jim Morris (3rd title)
- MVP: Todd Shiver (Georgia Tech)
- Attendance: 30,006

1987 Atlantic Coast Conference baseball standings
	Conf.						Overall
Team	W		L		T	PCT	W		L		T	PCT
No. 25 Georgia Tech ‍†‍‡‍^{y}	17	–	4	–	0	.810	51	–	14	–	0	.785
No. 10 Clemson ‍‍‍^{y}	16	–	5	–	0	.762	54	–	14	–	1	.790
North Carolina ‍‍‍	13	–	7	–	0	.650	31	–	22	–	0	.585
NC State ‍‍‍^{y}	12	–	8	–	0	.600	39	–	16	–	0	.709
Virginia ‍‍‍	5	–	12	–	0	.294	18	–	30	–	0	.375
Maryland ‍‍‍	5	–	12	–	0	.294	15	–	24	–	0	.385
Wake Forest ‍‍‍	4	–	13	–	0	.235	19	–	31	–	0	.380
Duke ‍‍‍	3	–	14	–	0	.176	18	–	26	–	0	.409
† – Conference champion ‡ – Tournament champion y – Invited to the NCAA tournament As of June 30, 1987; Rankings from Collegiate Baseball

The 1987 Atlantic Coast Conference baseball tournament was the 1987 postseason baseball championship of the NCAA Division I Atlantic Coast Conference, held at Greenville Municipal Stadium in Greenville, South Carolina, from May 11 through 15. Georgia Tech defeated NC State in the championship game, earning the conference's automatic bid to the 1987 NCAA Division I baseball tournament.

== Format ==
All eight ACC teams qualified for the eight-team double-elimination tournament.

=== Seeding Procedure ===
From TheACC.com:

On Saturday (The Semifinals) of the ACC baseball tournament, the match-up between the four remaining teams is determined by previous opponents. If teams have played previously in the tournament, every attempt will be made to avoid a repeat match-up between teams, regardless of seed. If it is impossible to avoid a match-up that already occurred, then the determination is based on avoiding the most recent, current tournament match-up, regardless of seed. If no match-ups have occurred, the team left in the winners bracket will play the lowest seeded team from the losers bracket.

== Regular season results ==
Team	W	L	PCT	GB	Seed
Georgia Tech	17	4	.810	–	1
Clemson	16	5	.762	1	2
North Carolina	13	7	.650	2.5	3
NC State	12	8	.600	4.5	4
Virginia	5	12	.294	10	5
Maryland	5	12	.294	10	6
Wake Forest	4	13	.235	11	7
Duke	3	14	.176	12	8

== Tournament ==
Upper round 1
8	Duke	1
1	Georgia Tech	3
5	Virginia	2
4	NC State	4
6	Maryland	9
3	North Carolina	13
7	Wake Forest	4
2	Clemson	11

Upper round 2
1	Georgia Tech	4
4	NC State	5
3	North Carolina	4
2	Clemson	9
Lower round 1
8	Duke	5
5	Virginia	0
6	Maryland	3
7	Wake Forest	7

Upper final
2	Clemson	8
4	NC State	0
Lower round 2
3	North Carolina	11
8	Duke	10
1	Georgia Tech	5
7	Wake Forest	3

Semifinals
2	Clemson	1
1	Georgia Tech	7
4	NC State	14
3	North Carolina	13

Preliminary final
4	NC State	11
2	Clemson	7

Final
4	NC State	0
1	Georgia Tech	6

== All-tournament team ==
Position	Player	School
C	Bert Heffernan	Clemson
1B	Turtle Zaun	NC State
2B	Chuck Baldwin	Clemson
3B	Carl Sitler	Georgia Tech
SS	Alex Wallace	NC State
OF	Mike Fowler	Georgia Tech
OF	Devy Bell	North Carolina
OF	Brian Bark	NC State
DH	Bill Steele	Clemson
SP	Todd Shiver	Georgia Tech
RP	Mark Wendel	NC State
MVP	Todd Shiver	Georgia Tech

== See also ==
- College World Series
- NCAA Division I Baseball Championship
- Atlantic Coast Conference baseball tournament
