= 1986 ACC tournament =

1986 ACC tournament may refer to:

- 1986 ACC men's basketball tournament
- 1986 ACC women's basketball tournament
- 1986 Atlantic Coast Conference baseball tournament
