= 1981 ACC tournament =

1981 ACC tournament may refer to:

- 1981 ACC men's basketball tournament
- 1981 ACC women's basketball tournament
- 1981 Atlantic Coast Conference baseball tournament
