= Charles Doak =

American baseball coach (1884–1956)

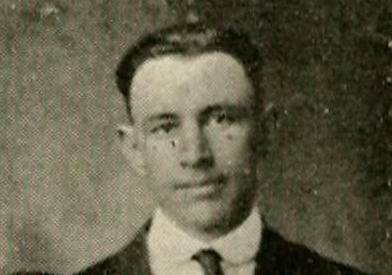
- Doak pictured in 1918

Biographical details
- Born: October 7, 1884; Guilford County, North Carolina, U.S.
- Died: April 21, 1956 (aged 71); Raleigh, North Carolina, U.S.

Coaching career (HC unless noted)

Basketball
- 1914–1916: North Carolina
- 1916–1918: Trinity (NC)

Baseball
- 1915–1916: North Carolina
- 1924–1939: NC State

Accomplishments and honors

Championships
- Baseball; 2 South Atlantic Conference (1924, 1928)

Charles Glenn "Chick" Doak (October 7, 1884 – April 21, 1956) coached baseball at North Carolina State University from 1924 to 1939 where he accumulated 145 wins, 131 losses, 6 ties.

Doak also played in the minor leagues and coached several college teams, such as at Guilford College, the University of North Carolina, and Trinity College.

Doak led the Wolfpack (the players were known as the "Doakmen") to the South Atlantic Championship only twice in his 16 seasons as coach (1924 and 1928), but his view that "the best defense is a hell of an offense" made for exciting games. Doak remained on NC State's physical education faculty until 1955. The baseball field to the east of Reynolds Coliseum (a space now occupied by the Coliseum parking deck) was named in his honor, and the name persisted to the fields current site. His sons, Charles and Robert, both played baseball for NC State.

== Basketball ==
After Nathaniel Cartmell was fired as the North Carolina Tar Heels men's basketball coach in 1914 for playing dice with known gamblers, Doak took over as the second head coach for the Tar Heels. Doak was generally more interested in coaching baseball and was not fully focused on coaching basketball. During the 1915–16 season, it was too difficult to get referees and so on some occasions Doak would actually referee games that the Tar Heels were playing. Doak was fairly successful as the head coach of the basketball team, but stepped down as head coach after the 1916 season to be replaced by Howell Peacock.

Doak went on to coach basketball at Trinity College, now known as Duke University. Doak remains the only person to coach men's basketball at both North Carolina and Duke, a notable feat considering the ferocity of the schools' modern rivalry.

== Death ==
Doak died of a heart attack in 1956.

== Head coaching record ==
=== Basketball ===
Record table
| Season | Team | Overall | Conference | Standing | Postseason |
|---|---|---|---|---|---|
North Carolina Tar Heels (Independent) (1914–1916)
| 1914–15 | North Carolina | 6–10 | | | |
| 1915–16 | North Carolina | 12–6 | | | |
| North Carolina: | | 18–16 | | | |
Trinity Blue and White (Independent) (1916–1918)
| 1916–17 | Trinity | 20–4 | | | |
| 1917–18 | Trinity | 10–5 | | | |
| Trinity: | | 30–9 | | | |
| Total: | | 48–25 | | | |
