= 1984 ACC tournament =

1984 ACC tournament may refer to:

- 1984 ACC men's basketball tournament
- 1984 ACC women's basketball tournament
- 1984 Atlantic Coast Conference baseball tournament
