= 1982 ACC tournament =

1982 ACC tournament may refer to:

- 1982 ACC men's basketball tournament
- 1982 ACC women's basketball tournament
- 1982 Atlantic Coast Conference baseball tournament
