= 1985 ACC tournament =

1985 ACC tournament may refer to:

- 1985 ACC men's basketball tournament
- 1985 ACC women's basketball tournament
- 1985 Atlantic Coast Conference baseball tournament
