= 1983 ACC tournament =

1983 ACC tournament may refer to:

- 1983 ACC men's basketball tournament
- 1983 ACC women's basketball tournament
- 1983 Atlantic Coast Conference baseball tournament
