= List of ACC Championship Games =

The title ACC Championship Game may refer to several sporting events that are sponsored by the Atlantic Coast Conference.

- The ACC Championship Game crowns the champion of the ACC football season.
- The championship game, or tournament final, of the ACC men's basketball tournament crowns the winner of the basketball season.
- The championship game, or tournament final, of the ACC women's basketball tournament crowns the winner of the basketball season.
- The championship game, or tournament final, of the ACC baseball tournament crowns the winner of the ACC baseball season.
