= 1986 Atlantic Coast Conference baseball tournament =

American college baseball tournament

- Teams: 7
- Format: Seven-team double elimination
- Finals site: Durham Athletic Park; Durham, North Carolina
- Champions: Georgia Tech (2nd title)
- Winning coach: Jim Morris (2nd title)
- MVP: Jeff Distasio (Georgia Tech)
- Attendance: 22,638

1986 Atlantic Coast Conference baseball standings
	Conf.				Overall
Team	W		L	PCT	W		L	PCT
No. 29 NC State ‍†‍‍^{y}	11	–	2	.846	35	–	15	.700
No. 17 Georgia Tech ‍‍‡‍^{y}	10	–	4	.714	45	–	23	.662
Clemson ‍‍‍	9	–	4	.692	42	–	21	.667
North Carolina ‍‍‍	7	–	7	.500	33	–	22	.600
Virginia ‍‍‍	6	–	7	.462	27	–	22	.551
Wake Forest ‍‍‍	6	–	8	.429	29	–	21	.580
Maryland ‍‍‍	3	–	10	.231	18	–	28	.391
Duke ‍‍‍	2	–	12	.143	25	–	17	.595
† – Conference champion ‡ – Tournament champion y – Invited to the NCAA tournament As of June 30, 1986; Rankings from Collegiate Baseball

The 1986 Atlantic Coast Conference baseball tournament was the 1986 postseason baseball championship of the NCAA Division I Atlantic Coast Conference, held at Durham Athletic Park in Durham, North Carolina, from May 14 through 17. Georgia Tech defeated NC State in the championship game, earning the conference's automatic bid to the 1985 NCAA Division I baseball tournament.

== Format and seeding ==
Seven of the eight ACC teams participated in the double-elimination tournament. Duke school policy did not allow the team to play after final exams had ended on April 28.

Team	W	L	PCT	GB	Seed
NC State	11	2	.846	–	1
Georgia Tech	10	4	.714	1.5	2
Clemson	9	4	.692	2	3
North Carolina	7	7	.500	4.5	4
Virginia	6	7	.462	5	5
Wake Forest	6	8	.429	5.5	6
Maryland	3	10	.231	8	7
Duke	2	12	.143	9.5	--

== Bracket and results ==
Upper round 1
4	North Carolina	5^{10}
5	Virginia	4
2	Georgia Tech	7
7	Maryland	5
3	Clemson	6^{14}
6	Wake Forest	5

Upper round 2
1	NC State	7^{11}
4	North Carolina	6
2	Georgia Tech	16
3	Clemson	5
Lower round 1
7	Maryland	9
6	Wake Forest	7

Upper final
1	NC State	3
2	Georgia Tech	7
Lower round 2
4	North Carolina	9
5	Virginia	7
3	Clemson	7^{10}
7	Maryland	2

Semifinals
2	Georgia Tech	9
4	North Carolina	7
1	NC State	6
3	Clemson	4

Final
2	Georgia Tech	9
1	NC State	6

== See also ==
- College World Series
- NCAA Division I Baseball Championship
- Atlantic Coast Conference baseball tournament
