= Doak Field =

Baseball venue in Raleigh, North Carolina

- The Doak
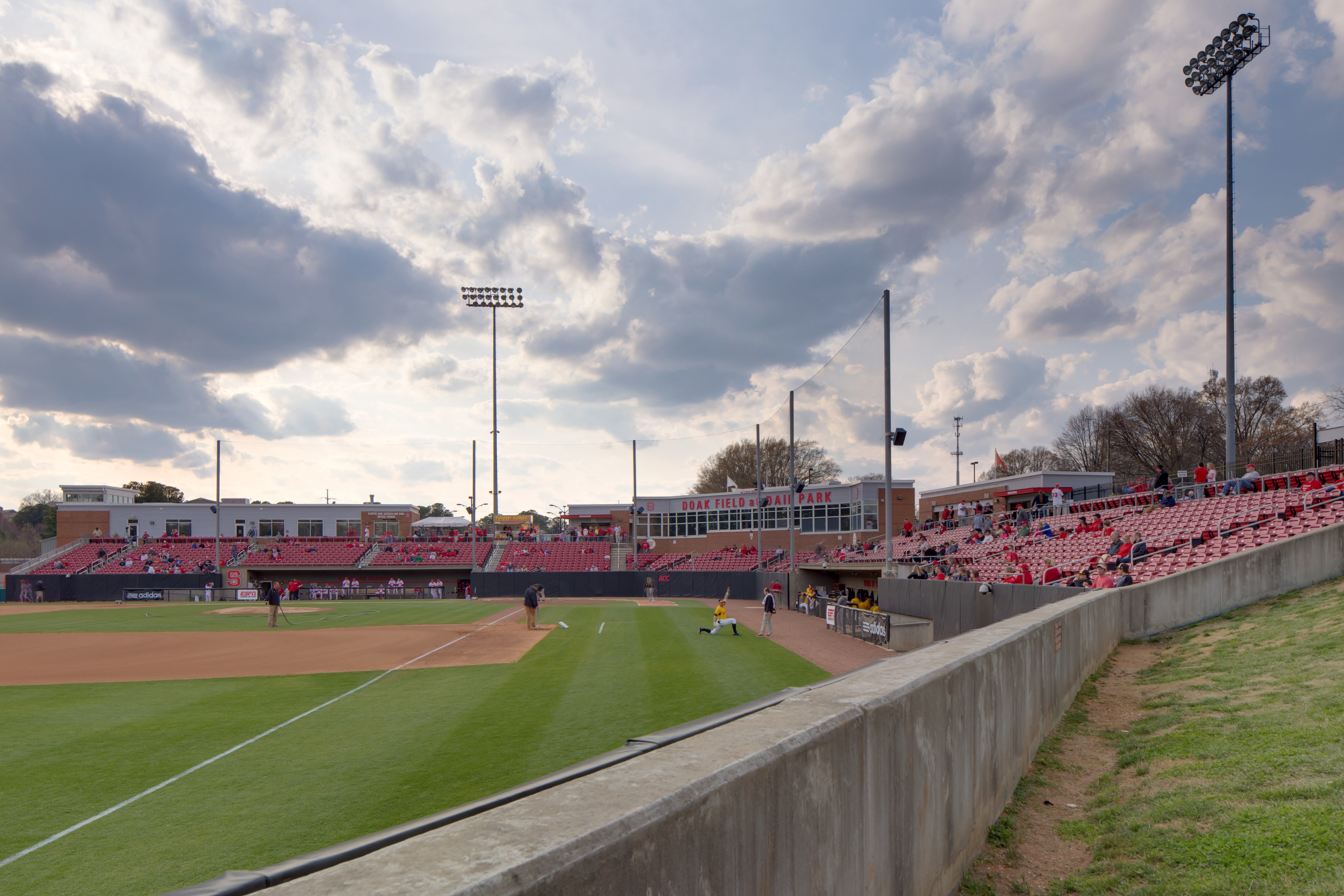
- Interactive map of Doak Field
- Full name: Doak Field at Dail Park
- Location: Raleigh, North Carolina
- Coordinates: 35°47′14″N 78°40′46″W
- Owner: North Carolina State University
- Operator: North Carolina State University
- Capacity: 3,000 (2,500 chairback seats)
- Surface: Grass
- Field size: Left Field – 320 ft (98 m); Center Field – 400 ft (120 m); Right Field – 330 ft (100 m)

Construction
- Opened: 1966
- Renovated: 2004

Tenants
- North Carolina State University (NCAA baseball); ACC Tournament, 1974, 1980; Raleigh RedWolves (CPL) 1997

Doak Field (or The Doak) is a baseball venue in Raleigh, North Carolina, United States. It opened in 1966 and is home to the NC State Wolfpack college baseball team of the NCAA's Division I Atlantic Coast Conference (ACC). It is named for Charles Doak, who was the head coach of the NC State baseball team from 1924 to 1939. The stadium is located on NC State's West Campus, behind Lee and Sullivan residence halls. The diamond is in the north/northwest corner of its block, which is bounded by Thurman Drive (third base, north/northeast); Dail Park and the residence halls (left field, east/southeast); Sullivan Drive (right field, south/southwest); and Varsity Drive (first base, west/northwest). Its seating capacity is 2,500 spectators, with an overflow capacity of 3,000. The largest crowd at Doak Field since its 2004 renovation was 3,109 on April 28, 2007, in a series finale between NC State and its rival UNC. Doak Field hosted the Atlantic Coast Conference baseball tournament in both 1974 and in 1980. NC State won the championship in 1974, while Clemson won in 1980.

Prior to 1966, the Wolfpack played their home games at Riddick Stadium, which was primarily a football facility.

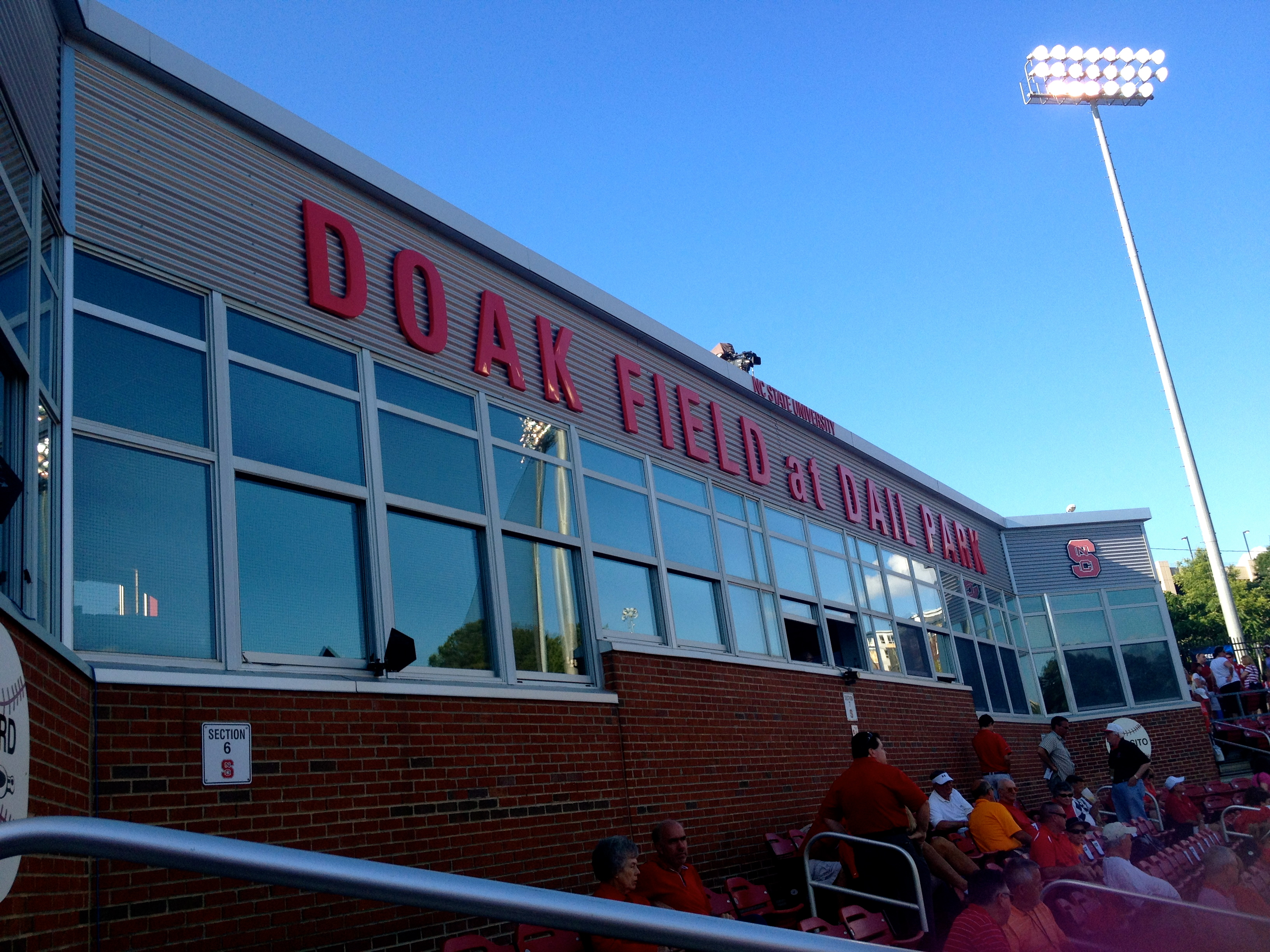
Doak Field at Dail Park

In 1997, Doak Field hosted the Raleigh RedWolves, a collegiate summer baseball team of the Coastal Plain League.

In May 2004, the stadium underwent a $6 million renovation which included leveling the playing field, a new drainage system, new grandstands, a new press box, and new concessions and bathroom facilities.

Since the renovation was completed in 2004, the dimensions at Doak Field are asymmetrical at 320 feet down the left-field line, 370 feet to the left-field power alley, 400 feet to straightaway center field, 375 feet to the right-field power alley, and 330 down the right-field line. The wall from the left-field line to deep left-center field is 16 feet high, then drops to eight feet high all the rest of the way around to right field.

In 2013, the Wolfpack ranked 33rd among Division I baseball programs in attendance, averaging 1,994 per home game. In 2014, the Wolfpack ranked 45th in attendance, averaging 1,344 per home game.

The student section of the grandstands along the third base line is known as Avent's Army. It is named for NC State baseball coach Elliott Avent.

== See also ==
- List of NCAA Division I baseball venues
