= 1982 Atlantic Coast Conference baseball tournament =

American college baseball tournament

- Teams: 8
- Format: Eight-team double elimination
- Finals site: Boshamer Stadium; Chapel Hill, North Carolina
- Champions: North Carolina (1st title)
- Winning coach: Mike Roberts (1st title)
- Attendance: 11,450

1982 Atlantic Coast Conference baseball standings
	Conf.				Overall
Team	W		L	PCT	W		L	PCT
Clemson ‍†‍‍	10	–	2	.833	37	–	22	.627
North Carolina ‍‍‡‍^{y}	7	–	5	.583	29	–	27	.518
Wake Forest ‍‍‍	6	–	5	.545	26	–	12	.684
NC State ‍‍‍	7	–	7	.500	24	–	13	.649
Georgia Tech ‍‍‍	6	–	8	.429	29	–	20	.592
Virginia ‍‍‍	5	–	7	.417	21	–	26	.447
Maryland ‍‍‍	4	–	7	.364	13	–	17	.433
Duke ‍‍‍	3	–	7	.300	16	–	13	.552
† – Conference champion ‡ – Tournament champion y – Invited to the NCAA tournament As of June 30, 1982; Rankings from Collegiate Baseball

The 1982 Atlantic Coast Conference baseball tournament was the 1982 postseason baseball championship of the NCAA Division I Atlantic Coast Conference, held at Boshamer Stadium in Chapel Hill, North Carolina, from April 21 through 25. North Carolina defeated Virginia in the championship game, earning the conference's automatic bid to the 1982 NCAA Division I baseball tournament.

== Format ==
All eight ACC teams qualified for the eight-team double-elimination tournament.

=== Seeding procedure ===
From TheACC.com:

On Saturday (The Semifinals) of the ACC baseball tournament, the match-up between the four remaining teams is determined by previous opponents. If teams have played previously in the tournament, every attempt will be made to avoid a repeat match-up between teams, regardless of seed. If it is impossible to avoid a match-up that already occurred, then the determination is based on avoiding the most recent, current tournament match-up, regardless of seed. If no match-ups have occurred, the team left in the winners bracket will play the lowest seeded team from the losers bracket.

== Regular season results ==
Team	W	L	PCT	GB	Seed
Clemson	10	2	.833	–	1
North Carolina	7	5	.583	3	2
Wake Forest	6	5	.545	3.5	3
NC State	7	7	.500	4	4
Georgia Tech	6	8	.429	5	5
Virginia	5	7	.417	5	6
Maryland	4	7	.364	5.5	7
Duke	3	7	.300	6	8

== Tournament ==
Upper round 1
8	Duke	9
1	Clemson	10
5	Georgia Tech	5
4	NC State	1
6	Virginia	10
3	Wake Forest	4
7	Maryland	7
2	North Carolina	8

Upper round 2
1	Clemson	16
5	Georgia Tech	2
2	North Carolina	3
6	Virginia	6
Lower round 1
4	NC State	6
8	Duke	5
3	Wake Forest	6
7	Maryland	3

Upper final
6	Virginia	6
1	Clemson	4
Lower round 2
4	NC State	3
2	North Carolina	4
5	Georgia Tech	6
3	Wake Forest	8

Semifinals
1	Clemson	0
2	North Carolina	3
3	Wake Forest	7
6	Virginia	3

Preliminary final
2	North Carolina	5
3	Wake Forest	4

Final
2	North Carolina	3
6	Virginia	2

== See also ==
- College World Series
- NCAA Division I Baseball Championship
- Atlantic Coast Conference baseball tournament
