= Greenville Municipal Stadium =

Stadium in Greenville, South Carolina

- Location within South Carolina Location within the United States
- Interactive map of Greenville Municipal Stadium
- Address: 840 Mauldin Road; Greenville, SC 29607
- Coordinates: 34.779884°N 82.351263°W
- Capacity: 7,048
- Field size: Left Field: 335 ft (102 m); Center Field: 405 ft (123 m); Right Field: 335 ft (102 m)

Construction
- Built: 1984; 42 years ago

Tenants
- Greenville Braves (Southern League) 1984–2004; Greenville Bombers (South Atlantic League) 2005

Greenville Municipal Stadium is a stadium in Greenville, South Carolina, U.S., that was built in 1984 and holds 7,048 people. It is located on Mauldin Road off exit 46C on I-85.

It was primarily used for baseball, and was the home field of the Greenville Bombers minor league baseball team before West End Field opened in 2006. It was also home to the Greenville Braves before they moved to Pearl, Mississippi, after the 2004 season. It hosted the Atlantic Coast Conference baseball tournament from 1987 to 1995.

The former stadium is now known as Conestee Park, a baseball complex and part of the Greenville County Recreation District.
