= 1984 Atlantic Coast Conference baseball tournament =

American college baseball tournament

- Teams: 8
- Format: Eight-team double elimination
- Finals site: Durham Athletic Park; Durham, North Carolina
- Champions: North Carolina (3rd title)
- Winning coach: Mike Roberts (3rd title)
- MVP: Todd Wilkinson (North Carolina)
- Attendance: 18,500

1984 Atlantic Coast Conference baseball standings
	Conf.				Overall
Team	W		L	PCT	W		L	PCT
Clemson ‍†‍‍	12	–	2	.857	38	–	17	.691
No. 22 North Carolina ‍†‍‡‍^{y}	12	–	2	.857	44	–	13	.772
NC State ‍‍‍	9	–	3	.750	32	–	8	.800
Maryland ‍‍‍	6	–	7	.462	18	–	14	.563
Georgia Tech ‍‍‍	5	–	7	.417	36	–	19	.655
Virginia ‍‍‍	4	–	10	.286	25	–	17	.595
Duke ‍‍‍	3	–	8	.273	25	–	13	.658
Wake Forest ‍‍‍	1	–	13	.071	17	–	25	.405
† – Conference champion ‡ – Tournament champion y – Invited to the NCAA tournament As of June 30, 1984; Rankings from Collegiate Baseball

The 1984 Atlantic Coast Conference baseball tournament was the 1984 postseason baseball championship of the NCAA Division I Atlantic Coast Conference, held at Durham Athletic Park in Durham, North Carolina, from April 18 through 21. North Carolina defeated Georgia Tech in the championship game, earning the conference's automatic bid to the 1984 NCAA Division I baseball tournament.

== Format ==
All eight ACC teams qualified for the eight-team double-elimination tournament.

=== Seeding procedure ===
From TheACC.com:

On Saturday (The Semifinals) of the ACC baseball tournament, the match-up between the four remaining teams is determined by previous opponents. If teams have played previously in the tournament, every attempt will be made to avoid a repeat match-up between teams, regardless of seed. If it is impossible to avoid a match-up that already occurred, then the determination is based on avoiding the most recent, current tournament match-up, regardless of seed. If no match-ups have occurred, the team left in the winners bracket will play the lowest seeded team from the losers bracket.

== Regular season results ==
Team	W	L	PCT	GB	Seed
North Carolina	12	2	.857	–	1
Clemson	12	2	.857	–	2
NC State	9	3	.750	2	3
Maryland	6	7	.462	5.5	4
Georgia Tech	5	7	.417	6	5
Virginia	4	10	.286	8	6
Duke	3	8	.273	7.5	7
Wake Forest	1	13	.071	11	8

== Tournament ==
Upper round 1
8	Wake Forest	2
1	North Carolina	13
5	Georgia Tech	0
4	Maryland	4
6	Virginia	0
3	NC State	10
7	Duke	8
2	Clemson	5

Upper round 2
4	Maryland	0
1	North Carolina	4
3	NC State	10
7	Duke	5
Lower round 1
8	Wake Forest	3
5	Georgia Tech	4
2	Clemson	7
6	Virginia	6

Upper final
1	North Carolina	13
3	NC State	12
Lower round 2
5	Georgia Tech	8
7	Duke	4
4	Maryland	1
2	Clemson	12

Semifinals
2	Clemson	6
1	North Carolina	7
3	NC State	3
5	Georgia Tech	5

Final
1	North Carolina	9
5	Georgia Tech	4

== See also ==
- College World Series
- NCAA Division I Baseball Championship
- Atlantic Coast Conference baseball tournament
