= Russ Chandler Stadium =

Baseball stadium in Atlanta, Georgia, US

Mac Nease Baseball Park at Russ Chandler Stadium Rose Bowl Field
- "The Rusty C"
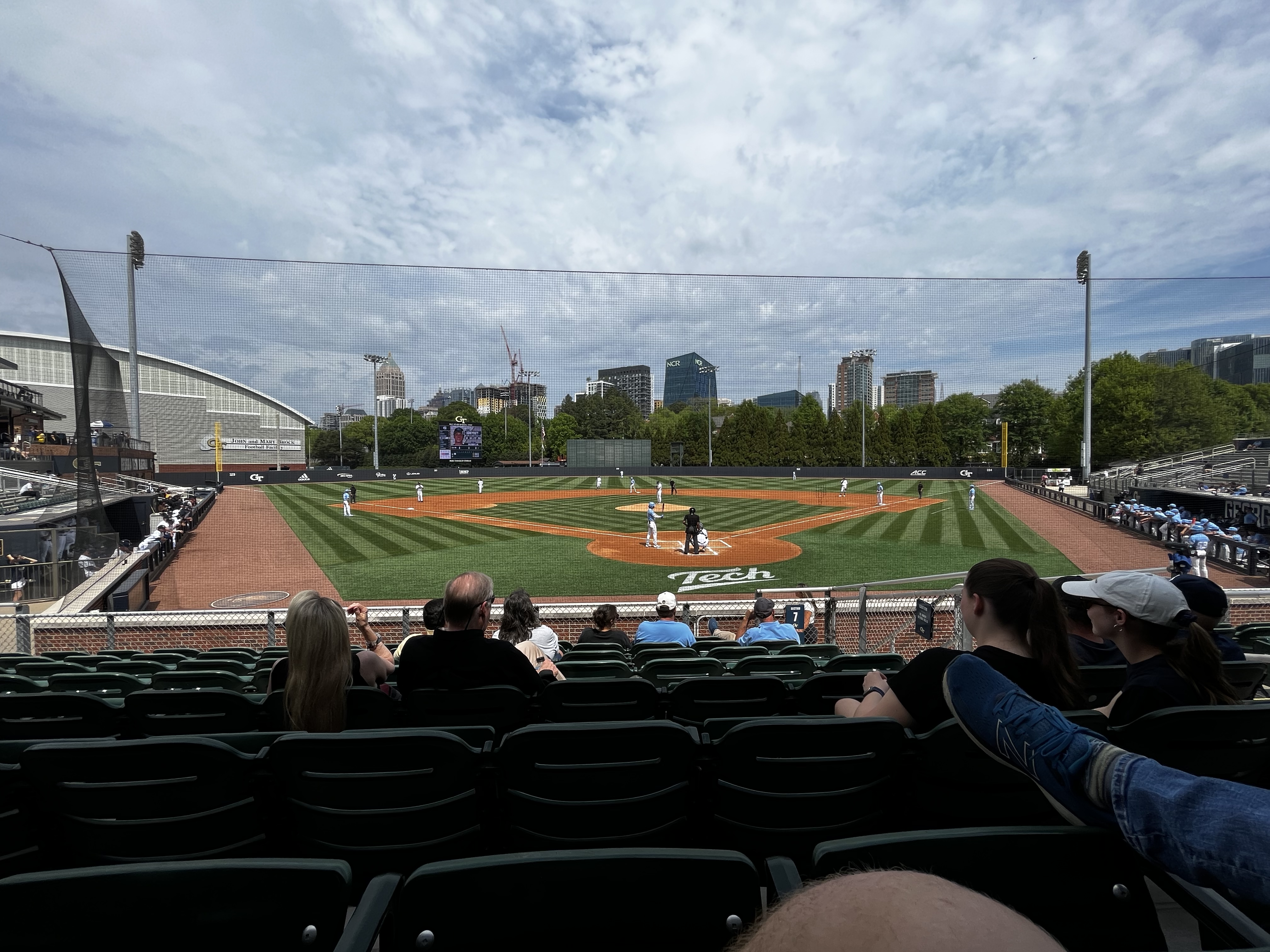
- A view of the ballpark during a 2023 game vs North Carolina.
- Interactive map of Mac Nease Baseball Park at Russ Chandler Stadium; Rose Bowl Field
- Former names: Rose Bowl Field (1930-1985)
- Location: 255 Ferst Drive, N.W. Atlanta, Georgia 30318
- Coordinates: 33.777491°N 84.394771°W
- Owner: Georgia Tech
- Operator: Georgia Tech Athletic Association
- Capacity: Chairback Seats: 1,100; Bench Seats: 2,618; Total Seats: 3,718
- Surface: Grass
- Field size: Left Field - 328 ft (100 m); Left Center Field - 391 ft (119 m); Center Field - 400 ft (122 m); Right Center Field - 353 ft (108 m); Right Field - 334 ft (102 m)

Construction
- Opened: 1930
- Renovated: 1985, 2002, 2020
- Cost: $9.7 million USD (2002 renovation)
- Architects: Hellmuth, Obata & Kassabaum (HOK)

Tenants
- Georgia Tech Yellow Jackets baseball (ACC); ACC Tournament (1985)

Mac Nease Baseball Park at Russ Chandler Stadium is a college baseball stadium in Atlanta, Georgia. It has been the home field of the Georgia Tech Yellow Jackets baseball team since 1930. The current stadium opened in 2002.

== History ==
=== Rose Bowl Field ===
The original stadium was built in 1930, using the payoff from the football team's participation in the 1929 Rose Bowl. The entire complex, which included three football practice fields, was named Rose Bowl Field. The complex stood behind a stone wall along 5th and Fowler streets.

In 1971, the permanent grandstand was torn down to make way for the extension of 5th Street. Lights were added in 1983.

=== Original stadium ===
The stadium existed with only bleacher seats until 1985, when A. Russell Chandler, III (BSIE '67) funded construction of a new grandstand that opened in time for Tech's centennial year. Fans of Georgia Tech baseball affectionately called it "The Rusty C" due to its extensive use of aluminum as a construction material.

=== Current stadium ===
The stadium was completely rebuilt in 2002. The new stadium features more brick and less aluminum in its construction materials than the previous one, but "Beesball" fans still affectionately refer to it as "The Rusty C." The stadium is located on the Georgia Tech campus in Midtown Atlanta. On April 9, 2008, the stadium set an attendance record of 4,609 for the Yellow Jackets versus the Georgia Bulldogs game held that night. The crowd totally eclipsed previous marks for both post-season (4,468 vs. Southern California on June 2, 2000) and regular-season games (4,264 vs. Georgia on March 27, 2002). One ranking of college baseball stadium experiences ranks it three

In 2013, the Yellow Jackets ranked 42nd among Division I baseball programs in attendance, averaging 1,525 per home game.

In 2020 the stadium was renovated again with a new facility called Champions Hall, as well as updated premium seating areas. This dropped the capacity from over 4,000 down to the current number of 3,718. The venue was renamed Mac Nease Baseball Park at Russ Chandler Stadium.

== See also ==
- List of NCAA Division I baseball venues
