= Brian Roberts (baseball) =

American baseball player (born 1977)

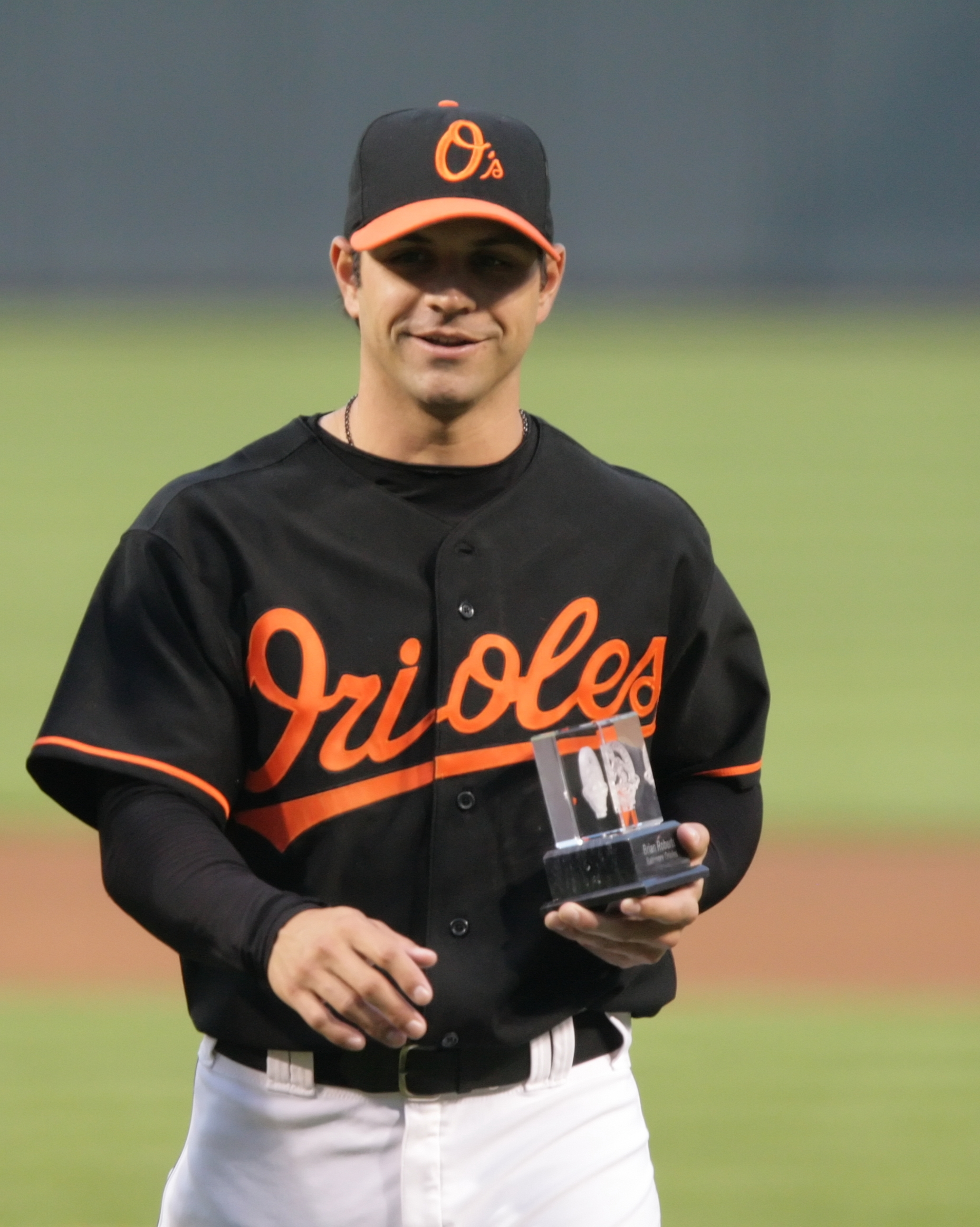
- Roberts with the Baltimore Orioles in 2006
- Second baseman
- Born: October 9, 1977 (age 49); Durham, North Carolina, U.S.
- Batted: Switch Threw: Right

MLB debut
- June 14, 2001, for the Baltimore Orioles

Last MLB appearance
- July 28, 2014, for the New York Yankees

MLB statistics
- Batting average: .276
- Home runs: 97
- Runs batted in: 542
- Stats at Baseball Reference

Teams
- Baltimore Orioles (2001–2013); New York Yankees (2014)

Career highlights and awards
- 2× All-Star (2005, 2007); AL stolen base leader (2007); Baltimore Orioles Hall of Fame

Brian Michael Roberts (born October 9, 1977) is an American former professional baseball second baseman. He made his Major League Baseball (MLB) debut with the Baltimore Orioles in 2001 and played for the team until 2013. He played his final season for the New York Yankees in 2014. He made it in the Baltimore Orioles Hall of Fame in 2018.

== Early life, education and college baseball career ==
Roberts was born in Durham, North Carolina, to parents Mike and Nancy Roberts. He grew up in Chapel Hill, North Carolina. At the age of 5, Roberts underwent open heart surgery to repair an atrial septal defect. He graduated from Chapel Hill High School.

=== College-baseball career ===
Roberts enrolled at the University of North Carolina, where he played college baseball for the North Carolina Tar Heels baseball team in the Atlantic Coast Conference (ACC) of NCAA Division I. His father, Mike Roberts, was the Tar Heels' head coach. No other Division I baseball program offered Roberts a scholarship.

During Roberts' freshman year in 1997, he batted .427, with 102 hits, including 24 doubles, and 47 stolen bases. His batting average was the second highest in the ACC. He was named to the National Collegiate Baseball Writers Association's (NCBWA) Second Team and the Collegiate Baseball Third Team. During his sophomore year, he hit .353, with 13 home runs, 49 runs batted in (RBIs), 21 doubles, 63 stolen bases. He was named a first-team All-American by the NCBWA, and second-team All-American by The Sporting News and Collegiate Baseball. His 63 stolen bases were more than any college player that year. He became the fifth Tar Heel to be named ACC player of the year. In 1998, he played collegiate summer baseball for the Chatham A's of the Cape Cod Baseball League.

North Carolina fired Roberts' father after the 1998 season. After the firing, Roberts transferred to the University of South Carolina, playing for the Gamecocks baseball team. Starting at shortstop, Roberts was named the best defensive college player by Baseball America. He batted .353, hit 12 home runs, and collected 36 RBIs. He still owns the school and Southeastern Conference (SEC) record for stolen bases in a season with 67 and was named to the All-SEC second team. He again was named a second-team All-American.

== Professional career ==
=== Baltimore Orioles ===
==== Minor leagues ====
Roberts was drafted by the Orioles in the first round (50th overall) of the 1999 MLB draft. He played for the Delmarva Shorebirds of the Single-A South Atlantic League in 1999, where he appeared in 47 games and hit .240 with 21 RBIs.

In 2000, he started with the rookie-level Gulf Coast League Orioles, batting .310 with a home run and three RBI in nine games. He also played 48 games with the Frederick Keys of the High-A Carolina League, hitting .301 with 16 RBI.

In 2001, Roberts spent parts of the season with the Triple-A Rochester Red Wings and the Double-A Bowie Baysox, batting a combined .277 with two home runs and 19 RBI in 66 games.

==== 2001–05 ====
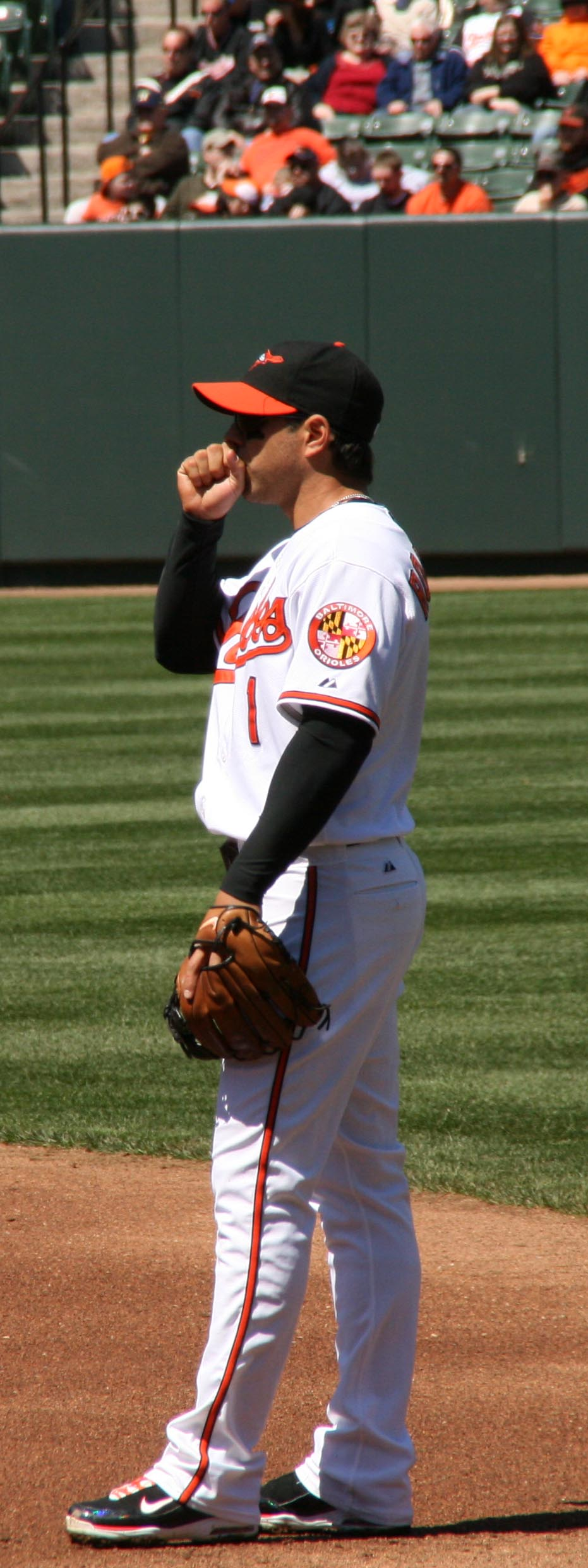
During home game in April 2009 against the Tampa Bay Rays

Roberts made his Major League debut for the Orioles on June 14, 2001 against the New York Mets, starting at shortstop and finishing the game 1-for-4. He played 75 games for Baltimore, batting .253 with two home runs and 17 RBIs.

In 2002, he played 38 games with the Orioles and batted .227 with a home run and 11 RBIs while stealing nine bases on 11 attempts. He also played 78 games with Triple-A Rochester, batting .275 with three home runs and 30 RBIs.

In 2003, he started for Ottawa, playing 44 games and hitting .315 with 15 RBIs. In late May, he was called up for injured second baseman Jerry Hairston Jr. He hit his first Major League grand slam in his second game (and his first in any sort of professional play) in the ninth inning against the Anaheim Angels to win that game. He finished with a .270 average, five home runs and 41 RBIs in 112 games, and stole 23 bases on 29 attempts (tied for eighth in American League).

The Orioles season started spring training in 2004 with both Hairston and Roberts on the roster. Hairston fractured his finger in spring training, however, and Roberts became the Opening Day starter. After Hairston returned from the disabled list, he was moved to right field, leaving Roberts at second base. In August, Roberts batted .346 with ten doubles in 107 at-bats. During the second week of August, Roberts was named the American League Player of the Week for hitting .531 over a span of six games. He finished 2004 with a .273 average, four home runs and 53 RBIs while collecting 175 hits in 159 games. He also hit 50 doubles, which led the American League and was third-best in the majors. His 50 doubles also broke the Orioles single-season record for doubles (originally set by Cal Ripken Jr.) and the single-season AL record for doubles by switch hitters.

Prior to the 2005 season, Hairston was traded to the Chicago Cubs (along with Oriole prospects Mike Fontenot and David Crouthers) for Sammy Sosa, thereby cementing Roberts's position as the Orioles' starting second baseman. In 2005, Roberts led the AL in batting average for the first several months of the season. In addition, he showed an increase in power; prior to the 2005 season, he had only 12 career home runs, but by late June, he had already outmatched that total. Fans awarded Roberts explosive offensive first half by voting him the starting second baseman in the 2005 Major League Baseball All-Star Game. It was Roberts' first appearance in the All-Star Game. As the season wore on, Roberts slumped and the Orioles slipped in the standings.

On September 20, 2005, Roberts dislocated his elbow in a game against the New York Yankees. The injury occurred in a collision with New York's Bubba Crosby at first base in the bottom of the second inning, and resulted in Roberts missing the rest of the season.

==== 2006–09 ====
Roberts rebounded from his 2005 injury with a strong 2006 campaign. He played in 138 games, batting .286 with 10 home runs and 55 RBIs, while also scoring 85 runs. He stole 36 bases in 43 attempts, and hit seven home runs in the last two months of the season. Roberts spent the early part of May on the 15-day disabled list with a strained left groin. He was activated on May 24.

Roberts played in over 150 games for the Orioles in 2007. Along with teammate Nick Markakis, he finished in the AL top 10 for at-bats, batting .290 with 12 home runs, 57 RBIs, and a .377 OBP on the way to his second All-Star berth. His 50 stolen bases, a career high, was tied with Carl Crawford for the AL lead; Roberts also set career marks in hits and walks.

On June 24, 2008, Roberts went 3-for-5 against the Cubs in a 7–5 victory. His third hit of the game was his 1,000th career base hit. He collected the 250th double of his career on July 28 against the New York Yankees. On September 21, 2008, Roberts grounded into the final out in the history of Old Yankee Stadium.

The Orioles and Roberts agreed to a four-year contract extension worth $40 million on February 20, 2009. The contract secured Roberts through the 2013 season. Following an injury to Boston Red Sox second baseman Dustin Pedroia, Roberts was added to Team USA's roster for the World Baseball Classic. Roberts batted .438 with one home run, two runs batted in and one stolen base in four games as the United States lost in the semifinals to Japan.

On August 4, in a game against the Detroit Tigers, Roberts hit his 300th career double in the first inning off of Jarrod Washburn. On September 15, he broke his own Orioles franchise record by hitting his 52nd double of the season. According to Spencer Fordin, "the two-time All-Star became one of four players all-time – along with Hall of Famers Tris Speaker, Paul Waner, and Stan Musial – to amass three 50-double seasons in his career."

On September 29, Roberts hit his 56th double of the season against the Tampa Bay Rays, setting the all-time single season mark for doubles in a season by a switch-hitter. His 56 doubles led the majors in 2009. On October 3, Roberts was named "Most Valuable Oriole" for 2009 and awarded an engraved lead trophy for his accomplishments.

==== 2010–13 ====
Roberts missed much of spring training in 2010 with a herniated disc in his lower back. He recovered in time for Opening Day, but started the season 2-for-14 (.143) before suffering an abdominal strain stealing second base and being forced onto the 15-day disabled list, effective as of April 10. On July 12, Roberts began to play in rehab games without having a setback, as it is the first time he has been on the field since April 10. On July 23, Roberts returned to the Orioles' lineup for the first time since April 9.

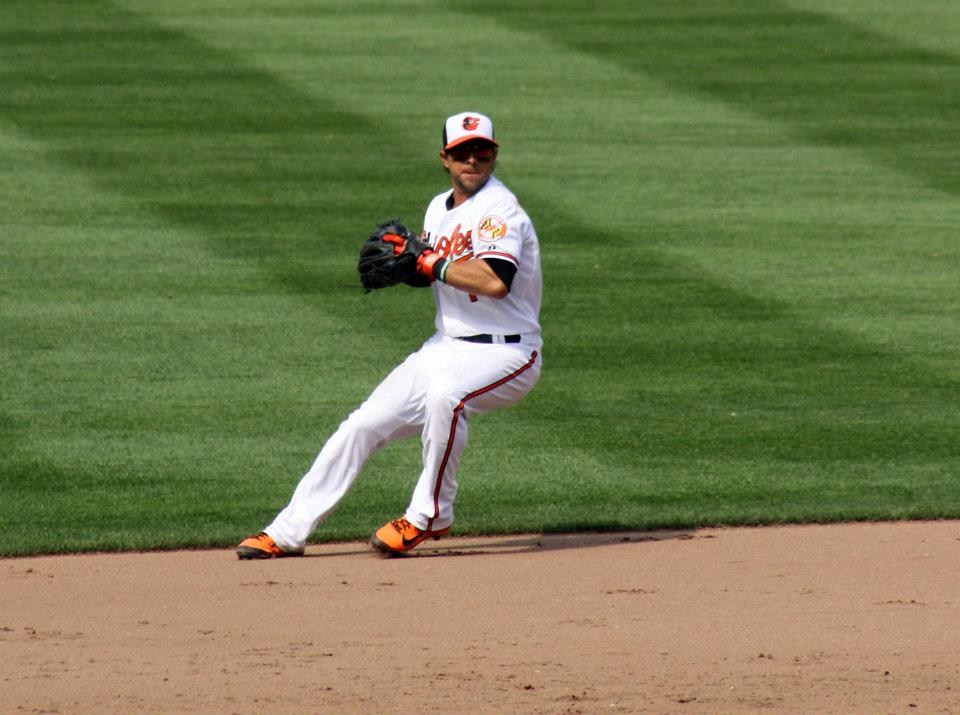
Brian Roberts fielding second base in 2012.

Roberts suffered a concussion on September 27, 2010, after he hit himself in the head with his baseball bat out of frustration. He suffered his second concussion on May 16, 2011, when he slid into first base headfirst and hit the back of his head. He did not return for the remainder of the season.

Through the beginning of the season, Roberts continued his stay on the disabled list, but traveled with the team and remained an active member of the dugout. On May 22, Buck Showalter announced Roberts would be starting his rehab stint with the Double-A Bowie Baysox. His final five rehab games were played with the Triple A Norfolk Tides. Roberts returned to the Orioles on June 12, 2012, starting at second base and finishing the game 3-for-4 in an 8–6 win over the Pittsburgh Pirates. However, a groin strain returned him to the disabled list on July 3, and after a brief attempt at another rehab assignment, he elected to have season-ending hip surgery on July 29 in hopes to return fresh to spring training in 2013.

In spring training in 2013, Roberts reported that he was free of the post-concussion syndrome resulting from his 2011 concussion. On April 4, during the Orioles' third game of the season, Roberts ruptured a tendon behind his right knee while stealing second base in the ninth inning of a 6–3 victory over the Tampa Bay Rays. He was placed on the 15-day DL, with an expected downtime of three to four weeks. Roberts was activated from the disabled list on June 30. In 77 games with the Orioles, he batted .249 with eight home runs and 39 RBIs.

==== Steroid allegations ====
On September 30, 2006, the Los Angeles Times reported that during a June 6, 2006, federal raid, former relief pitcher Jason Grimsley named Roberts as a user of anabolic steroids. The Times reported that Roberts was one of five names blacked out in an affidavit filed in federal court. However, on October 3, 2006, The Washington Post reported that San Francisco United States attorney Kevin Ryan said that the Los Angeles Times report contained "significant inaccuracies." On December 20, 2007, the actual names in the Grimsley search warrant affidavit were revealed to the public. Roberts, Jay Gibbons, Andy Pettitte and Roger Clemens were not actually named in the report and Miguel Tejada was named only for having a conversation about amphetamines. Roberts, along with the other four players named, denounced the story. Roberts was subsequently named in George Mitchell's report on performance-enhancing drugs. According to page 158 of the Mitchell Report, Roberts lived with then-teammate Larry Bigbie in David Segui's house near the end of the 2001 season. Bigbie and Segui were regular steroid users; while they were using the performance-enhancing drugs and Roberts was present, he asserted that he did not participate. According to Bigbie's testimony, Roberts told him in 2004 that he had injected himself with steroids "once or twice" in 2003.

On December 17, 2007, Roberts released a statement admitting to using steroids one time:

"In 2003, when I took one shot of steroids", he said. "I immediately realized that this was not what I stood for or anything that I wanted to continue doing. I never used steroids, human growth hormone or any other performance-enhancing drugs prior to or since that single incident.

"I can honestly say before God, myself, my family and all of my fans, that steroids or any performance-enhancing drugs have never had any effect on what I have worked so hard to accomplish in the game of baseball."

Roberts further stated that he had no ill-will against Bigbie, whose testimony to the Mitchell Committee was responsible for his inclusion in the report.

=== New York Yankees ===
Roberts became a free agent for the first time in his career after the 2013 season. Roberts agreed to a one-year contract with the New York Yankees worth $2 million, which had incentives that could have raised the deal’s value to $4.6 million On August 1, 2014, Roberts was designated for assignment by the Yankees, and he was released on August 9. In 91 games with the Yankees, Roberts batted .237 with five home runs, 21 RBI, and seven stolen bases.

== Retirement and broadcasting work ==
On October 17, 2014, Roberts announced his retirement from professional baseball. He issued a statement that said that he felt like he could not play well anymore.

Roberts joined the Baltimore Orioles Radio Network prior to the 2018 season as a part-time color analyst.

== Personal life ==
In January 2009, Roberts married Diana Chiafair. They had their first child in August 2013.

== See also ==
- List of Major League Baseball annual doubles leaders
- List of Major League Baseball career stolen bases leaders
- List of Major League Baseball players named in the Mitchell Report
- List of Major League Baseball annual stolen base leaders

Preceded by Vladimir Guerrero	American League Player of the Month; April 2005	Succeeded by Alex Rodriguez
Preceded by Dustin Pedroia	American League doubles leader 2009	Succeeded by Adrián Beltré
