= Boshamer Stadium =

Baseball stadium in North Carolina, US

Bryson Field at Boshamer Stadium
- The Bosh, The Boshamer Library, The Bosh Pit
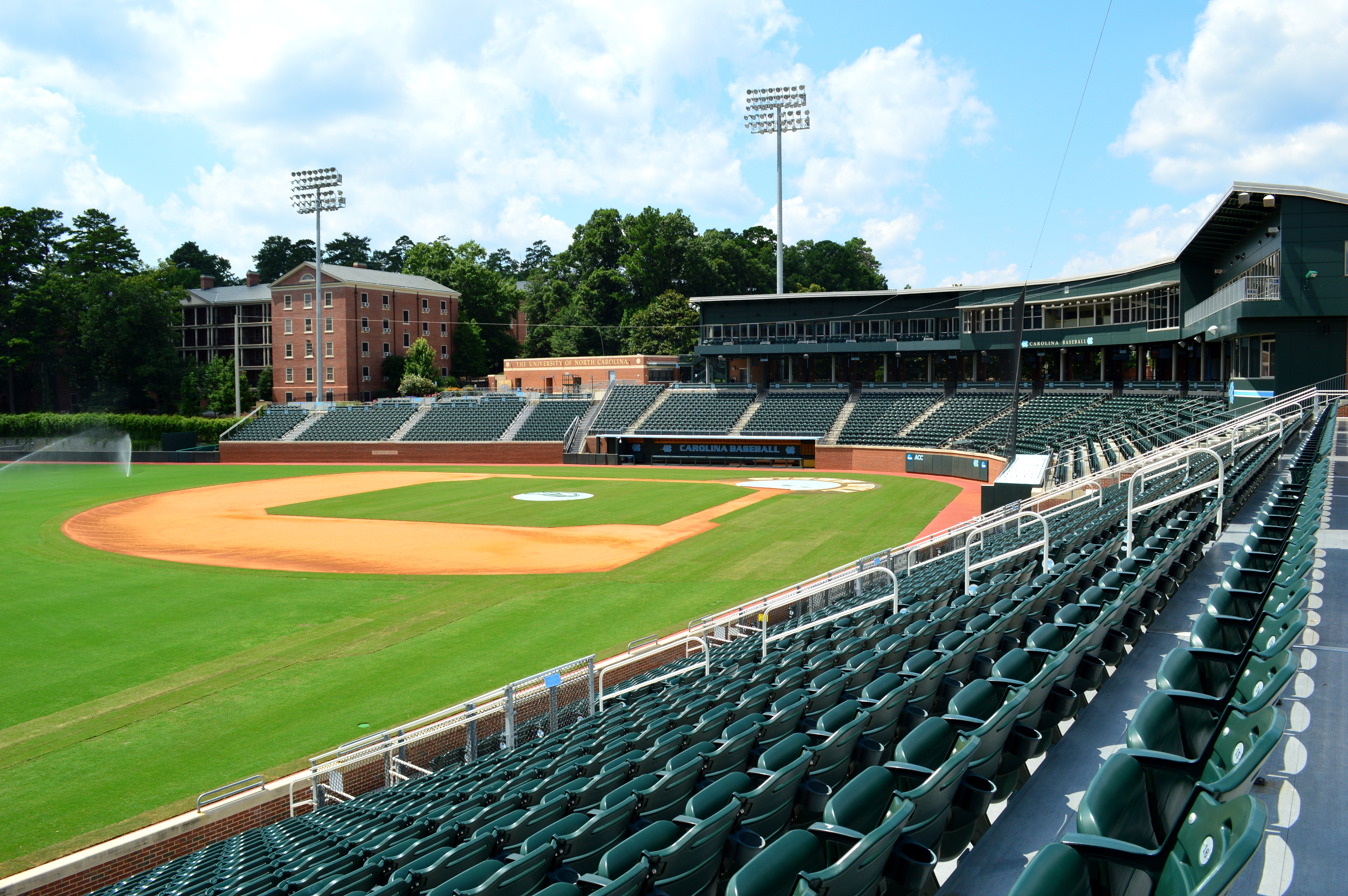
- Interactive map of Bryson Field at Boshamer Stadium
- Full name: Bryson Field at Cary C. Boshamer Stadium
- Location: 235 Ridge Rd, Chapel Hill, NC 27599-5071, USA
- Coordinates: 35°54′23.36″N 79°2′34.71″W
- Owner: University of North Carolina at Chapel Hill
- Operator: University of North Carolina at Chapel Hill
- Capacity: 4,100 (standing room up to 5,000)
- Surface: Natural grass
- Record attendance: 4,491 (June 8th, 2024 vs. West Virginia)
- Field size: Left Field: 335 ft (102.1 m); Left Center Field: 370 ft (112.8 m); Center Field: 400 ft (121.9 m); Right Center Field: 355 ft (108.2 m); Right Field: 340 ft (103.6 m)

Construction
- Built: 1970–1972
- Opened: March 21, 1972
- Renovated: 2007–2009
- Cost: $25.5 million (expansion)
- Architect: Populous (expansion)
- Structural engineer: LHC Structural Engineers (2008 expansion)

Tenants
- North Carolina Tar Heels (NCAA) 1972–2007, 2009–present ACC Tournament (1973, 1975, 1981–1983)

Cary C. Boshamer Stadium is a baseball stadium in Chapel Hill, North Carolina. It is the home of the North Carolina Tar Heels baseball team.

== History ==
The previous home of the Tar Heels was a multi-use venue called Emerson Field, which sat some 2,400 people. The combination baseball/football field was opened in 1916 on the site of the existing athletic field (ca. 1900) and named for a university benefactor, Captain Isaac E. Emerson, best known as the inventor of Bromo-Seltzer. The football team left Emerson for Kenan Memorial Stadium in 1927. Emerson would continue as the home of the baseball team for another 45 seasons. Its site is now occupied by Davis Library.

Boshamer Stadium first opened on March 21, 1972, near the tail end of the 1972 season. It is named for Cary C. Boshamer (class of 1917), a textile industrialist from Gastonia whose donation made the new stadium possible. Although many Tar Heels players and fans speak of the stadium as "the Bosh", apparently the family survivors favor the "Boss-hammer" pronunciation.

It has hosted five Atlantic Coast Conference baseball tournaments, in 1973, 1975, 1981, 1982, and 1983. North Carolina won the 1982 and 1983 tournaments.

The Tar Heels' on-field success during the mid-2000s coincided with the decision to rebuild the 35-year-old facility. Following the 2007 season, the stadium was almost completely demolished and rebuilt. UNC won their final game in the old Boshamer Stadium 9–4 over the University of South Carolina.

=== 2008 renovations ===
Due to extensive renovations to Boshamer, the Tar Heels played their 2008 season at USA Baseball National Training Complex in nearby Cary.

The rebuilt stadium first opened on February 2, 2009. At that time, the playing surface was formally renamed Bryson Field in honor of former first baseman Vaughn Bryson and his wife Nancy, both longtime supporters of the baseball program.

The entrance courtyard of the rebuilt stadium is named for the Steinbrenner family, as the result of a $1 million donation by New York Yankees owner George Steinbrenner, whose grandchildren graduated from UNC.

Since expansion, the stadium has a listed capacity of 4,100, but has standing room for up to 5,000. Before renovations, it seated 3,000 people from the end of one dugout to the other. Today, seating extends down both the 1st and 3rd base lines. Sections past the dugout on the 1st base line are now reserved for student seating, nicknamed "The Bosh Pit".

== Attendance ==
In 2013, the Tar Heels ranked 32nd among Division I baseball programs in attendance, averaging 1,998 per home game. The stadium is most raucous during NCAA Tournament regional and super regional play which generally sell out.

== Dimensions ==
The field dimensions are as follows:

- Left Field: 335 ft (102.1 m)
- Left Center Field: 370 ft (112.8 m)
- Center Field: 400 ft (121.9 m)
- Right Center Field: 355 ft (108.2 m)
- Right Field: 340 ft (103.6 m)

The asymmetry of the field is partly the result of an inward bulge in the fence in right center.

== Field Maintenance ==
Casey Carrick takes immaculate care of Bryson Field for The UNC Department of Athletics. Carrick serves as Director of Athletic Grounds and Turf Management. In that role, he oversees the daily maintenance and renovation of 30 acres of athletic turf across the Tar Heels' facilities.

== Photos ==
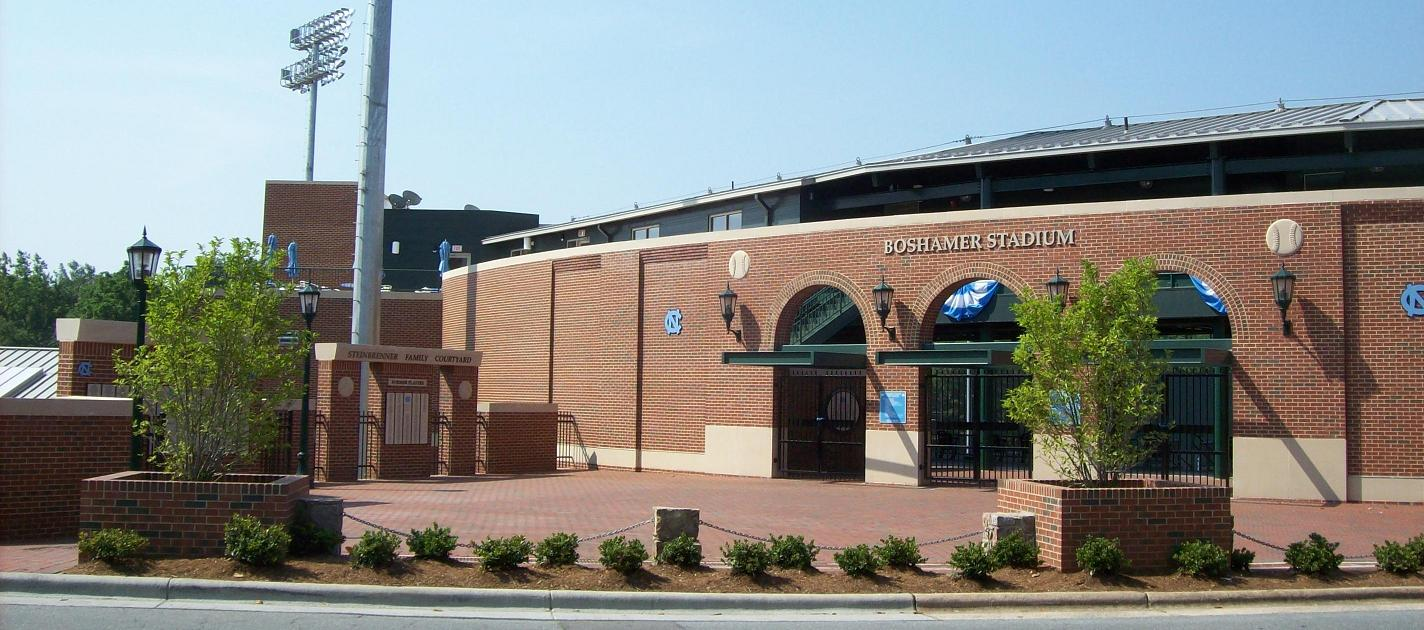
Steinbrenner Terrace at Boshamer Stadium

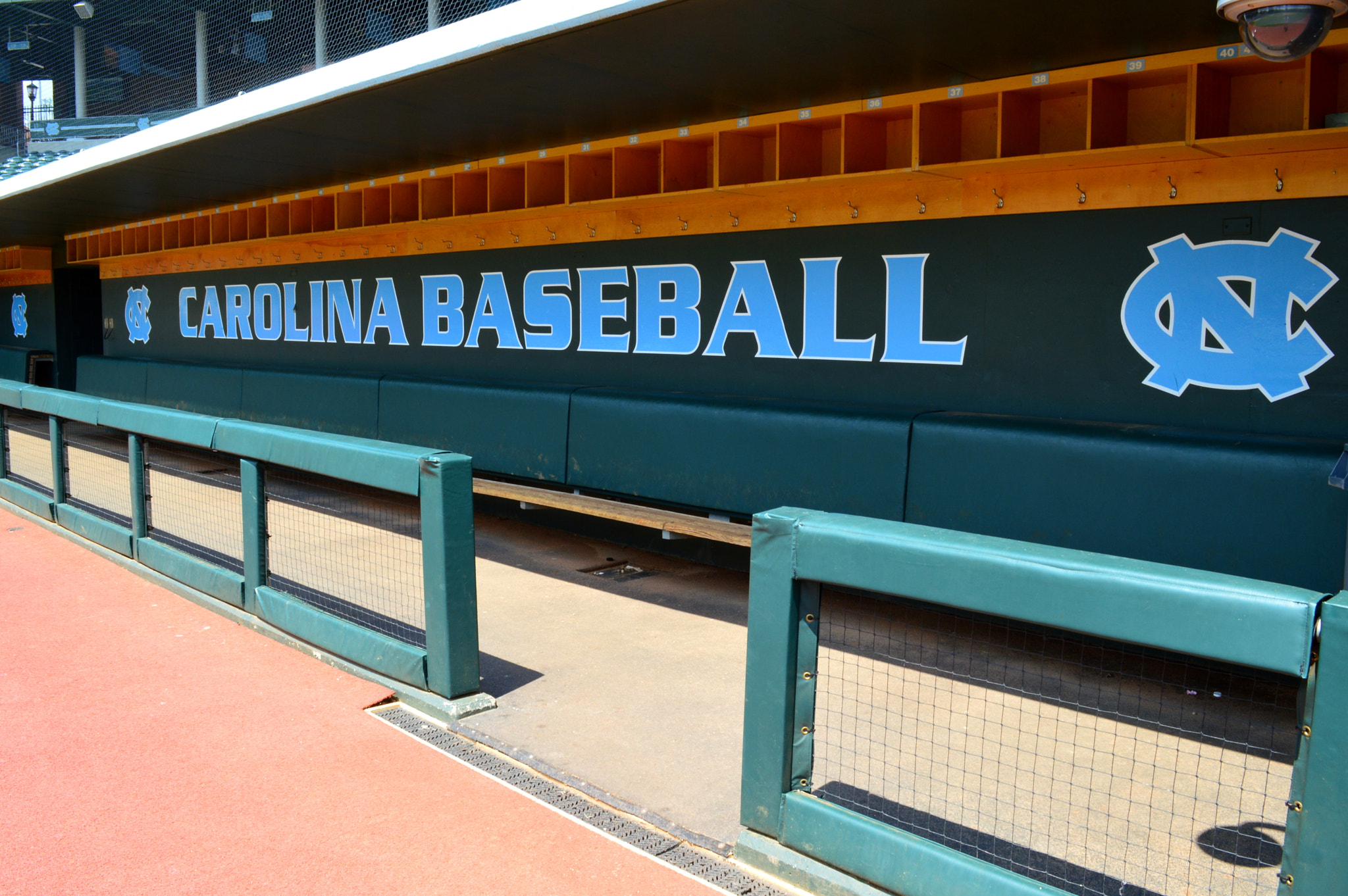
Carolina Baseball dugout at Boshamer Stadium

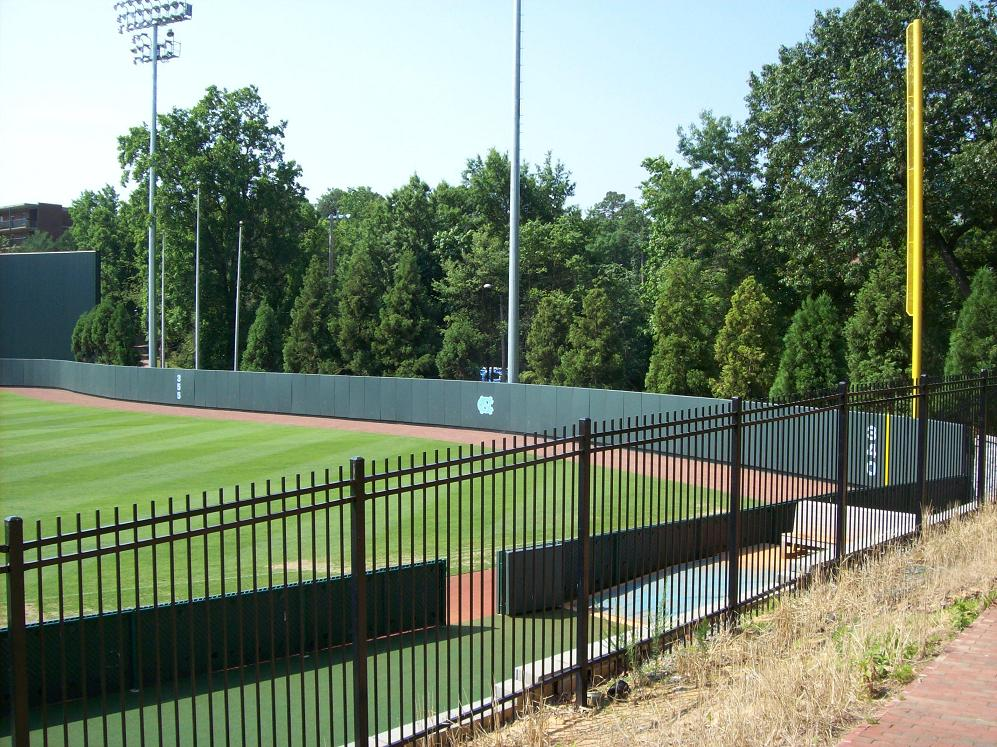
The right field bulge

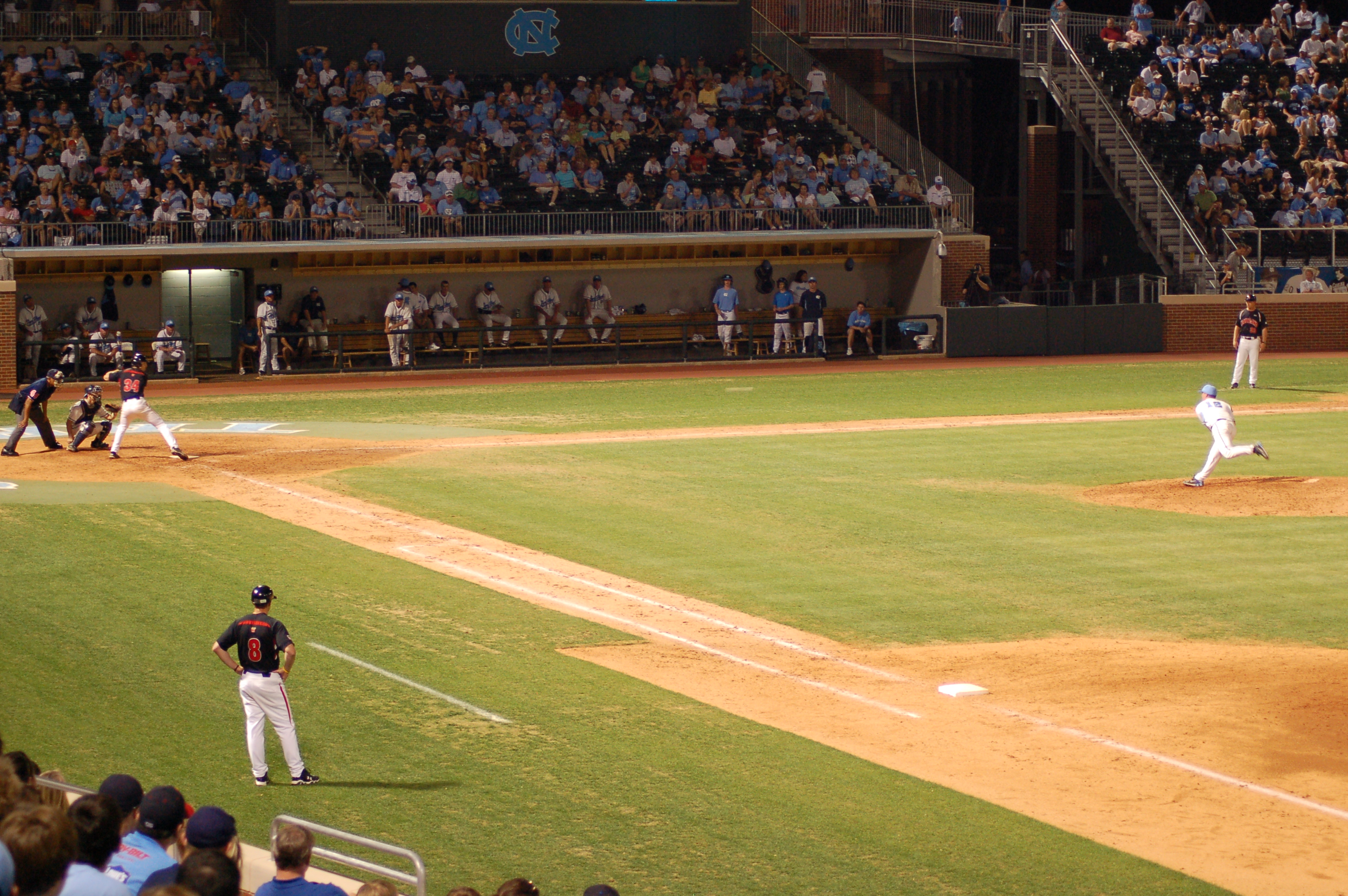
Game action against University of Maryland, College Park on April 25, 2009

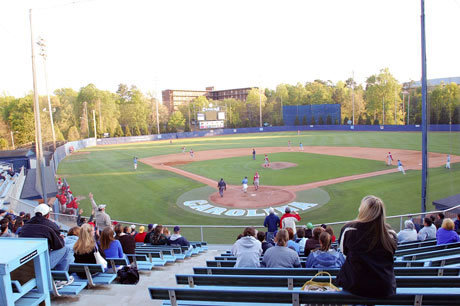
Boshamer Stadium before 2007

== See also ==
- List of NCAA Division I baseball venues
