= Atlantic Coast Conference baseball tournament =

Baseball tournament

- Conference baseball championship
- Sport: Baseball
- Conference: Atlantic Coast Conference
- Number of teams: 16
- Format: Modified single elimination tournament
- Current stadium: Truist Field
- Current location: Charlotte, NC
- Played: 1973–1978, 1980–present
- Last contest: 2025
- Current champion: Georgia Tech (10th)
- Most championships: Clemson (11)
- TV partner(s): FS South, Sun Sports, CSN Mid-Atlantic, NESN, SportSouth, ACCN
- Official website: TheACC.com Baseball

Host stadiums
- Louisville Slugger Field (2017); Durham Bulls Athletic Park (1996, 1998–99, 2009, 2011, 2013, 2015–16, 2018-2019, 2023, 2025); Truist Field (2021–2022, 2024); First National Bank Field (2010, 2012, 2014); Baseball Grounds of Jacksonville (2005–08); Salem Memorial Baseball Stadium (2003–04); Florida Power Park (1997, 2002); Knights Stadium (2000–2001); Greenville Municipal Stadium (1987–95); Durham Athletic Park (1984, 1986); Russ Chandler Stadium (1985); Boshamer Stadium (1973, 1975, 1981–83); Doak Field (1974, 1980); Beautiful Tiger Field (1976–78)

Host locations
- Louisville, KY (2017); Charlotte, NC (2021–2022, 2024); Durham, NC (1984, 1986, 1996, 1998, 2009, 2011, 2013, 2015–16, 2018-2019, 2023, 2025); Greensboro, NC (2010, 2012, 2014); Jacksonville, FL (2005–08); Salem, VA (2003–04); St. Petersburg, FL (1997, 2002); Fort Mill, SC (2000–2001); Greenville, SC (1987–95); Atlanta, GA (1985); Chapel Hill, NC (1973, 1975, 1981–83); Raleigh, NC (1974, 1980); Clemson, SC (1976–78)

The Atlantic Coast Conference baseball tournament, sometimes referred to simply as the ACC tournament, is the conference championship tournament in baseball for the Atlantic Coast Conference (ACC). In 2017, the event adopted a modified twelve-team pool play format. The winner receives the conference's automatic bid to the NCAA Division I baseball tournament.

== History ==
The ACC has a history of odd formats for its baseball championship. Since 1973, the first year of the tournament, the format has changed six times. The current format is a four-group, three-team round robin tournament with the winner of each grouping playing in a single-elimination tournament for the semifinals and final.

=== 1973–78 ===
See Example: 1976 Atlantic Coast Conference baseball tournament

For the first six seasons of the tournament, the ACC had seven members, resulting in a format where the #1 seed received a bye to play the winner of the #4 v #5 match-up. The first round of the tournament was single-elimination with the losers going home. After the first round, the remaining 4 teams played a traditional double-elimination-style tournament.

=== 1979 ===
Due to conflicts with exams, the ACC opted to not hold a tournament. Instead, the regular season winner Clemson was given the conference's automatic bid to the 1979 NCAA Division I baseball tournament.

=== 1980–2003 ===
Example: 1981 Atlantic Coast Conference baseball tournament

Beginning with the addition of Georgia Tech to the conference in 1980, the ACC began using a format closer to that of a true double-elimination tournament with a few exceptions.

- The winner of the Winner's Bracket Quarterfinal match (Game 12) would play the winner of either Quarterfinal match of the Loser's Bracket (Game 10 or 11). The decision of which teams faced each other was determined by whether or not they had already faced each other in the tournament.

From TheACC.com:

On Saturday (The Semifinals) of the ACC Baseball Tournament, the match-up between the four remaining teams is determined by previous opponents. If teams have played previously in the tournament, every attempt will be made to avoid a repeat match-up between teams, regardless of seed. If it is impossible to avoid a match-up that already occurred, then the determination is based on avoiding the most recent, current tournament match-up, regardless of seed. If no match-ups have occurred, the team left in the winners bracket will play the lowest seeded team from the losers bracket.

- If the winner of the Winner's Bracket Quarterfinal match (Game 12) loses in the Semifinal match (Game 13), that team will receive a bye and play the winner of the Finals match in a winner-take-all championship game.

=== 1991–2003 ===
With the introduction of Florida State into the ACC to bring the total teams to nine, the baseball tournament added a Play-In game where the bottom two teams in the conference regular season standings played in a winner-takes-all game for the 8th spot in the regular tournament.

=== 2004 ===
In 2004, the ACC began using a true eight-team double-elimination tournament with the bottom two teams in regular season conference play facing each other in a single-elimination game where the winner got the #8 spot in the regular tournament.

=== 2005 ===
In 2004, the conference expanded to 11 teams with the addition of Miami and Virginia Tech. Beginning with the 2005 Baseball Tournament, the tournament switched from a true eight-team double-elimination to two four-team double-elimination brackets with winner of each side playing in a winner-take-all championship game. The bottom four teams in conference play faced off in a single-elimination bracket, with the winner earning the #8 spot in the tournament.

=== 2006 ===
In 2005, Boston College joined the conference, bringing the total number of members to 12. Instead of adjusting the tournament yet again, the tournament would remain the same format as was developed in 2005, but the ACC eliminated the play-in round.

=== 2007–2013 ===
See Example: 2007 Atlantic Coast Conference baseball tournament

Beginning in 2007, the ACC developed a new tournament format that eliminated the brackets altogether. This new format was a two-group, four-team round robin tournament with the winner of each grouping playing in a winner-take-all championship game. Only the top eight teams in the regular season conference standings were invited to play in the tournament. On July 6, 2009, the Atlantic Coast Conference announced a decision to move three future baseball tournaments out of Myrtle Beach, citing miscommunications with the NAACP concerning the display of the Confederate flag in South Carolina. (Charlotte was included in the NAACP Boycott because Knights Stadium was in York County, South Carolina, less than five kilometers from the state line.) The 2010 ACC tournament was initially scheduled to take place at Fenway Park, but cost-containment for schools (most of whom would have to fly to Boston) was cited for moving the tournament to Greensboro.

=== 2014–2016 ===
Beginning in 2014, with the expansion of the conference, the tournament expanded to ten teams. The four lower seeds (7 vs 10 and 8 vs 9) played a one-game play-in game to participate in pool play with the 6 higher seeds.

=== 2017 ===
On September 14, 2016, the ACC announced that the 2017 tournament slated to be played in Durham, NC, along with neutral site championships for seven other sports, would be moved out of the state of North Carolina due to the controversial NC House Bill 2. On October 4, 2016, it was announced that Louisville Slugger Field in Louisville, Kentucky, would be the new host venue for 2017.

On October 6, 2016, the ACC announced that the tournament would expand to twelve teams and have a new format. The regular season winners of the Atlantic and Coastal divisions claim the top two seeds, while the remaining seeds are determined by conference winning percentage. The teams are split up into four pools of three teams each. The pools are a round robin format, with each team in the tournament guaranteed a minimum of two games. If a pool fails to produce a team with two wins, the top seed automatically advances. The four winners of pool play then advance to a four team, single-elimination bracket to determine the conference champion.

== Champions ==
=== By year ===
Year	Champion	Runner-up	Site	MVP
1973	NC State	Clemson	Boshamer Stadium • Chapel Hill, NC	None Selected
1974	NC State	Clemson	Doak Field • Raleigh, NC	None Selected
1975	NC State	Clemson	Boshamer Stadium • Chapel Hill, NC	None Selected
1976	Clemson	Maryland	Beautiful Tiger Field • Clemson, SC	None Selected
1977	Wake Forest	Clemson	Beautiful Tiger Field • Clemson, SC	None Selected
1978	Clemson	Wake Forest	Beautiful Tiger Field • Clemson, SC	None Selected
1979	No tournament due to conflict with exams			None Selected
1980	Clemson	North Carolina	Doak Field • Raleigh, NC	None Selected
1981	Clemson	North Carolina	Boshamer Stadium • Chapel Hill, NC	None Selected
1982	North Carolina	Virginia	Boshamer Stadium • Chapel Hill, NC	None Selected
1983	North Carolina	Clemson	Boshamer Stadium • Chapel Hill, NC	Scott Bankhead, P, UNC
1984	North Carolina	Georgia Tech	Durham Athletic Park • Durham, NC	Todd Wilkinson, OF, UNC
1985	Georgia Tech	Clemson	Russ Chandler Stadium • Atlanta, GA	Scott Jordan, OF, GT
1986	Georgia Tech	NC State	Durham Athletic Park • Durham, NC	Jeff Distasio, 1B, GT
1987	Georgia Tech	NC State	Greenville Municipal Stadium • Greenville, SC	Todd Shiver, P, GT
1988	Georgia Tech	North Carolina	Greenville Municipal Stadium • Greenville, SC	Ty Griffin, 2B, GT
1989	Clemson	North Carolina	Greenville Municipal Stadium • Greenville, SC	Brian Barnes, P, CU
1990	North Carolina	NC State	Greenville Municipal Stadium • Greenville, SC	Steve Estroff, 1B, UNC
1991	Clemson	Georgia Tech	Greenville Municipal Stadium • Greenville, SC	Michael Spiers, OF, CU
1992	NC State	Clemson	Greenville Municipal Stadium • Greenville, SC	Matt Donahue, P, NCSU
1993	Clemson	NC State	Greenville Municipal Stadium • Greenville, SC	Jeff Morris, 2B, CU
1994	Clemson	Florida State	Greenville Municipal Stadium • Greenville, SC	Shane Monahan, OF, CU
1995	Florida State	Clemson	Greenville Municipal Stadium • Greenville, SC	Jonathan Johnson, P, FSU
1996	Virginia	Florida State	Durham Bulls Athletic Park • Durham, NC	Seth Greisinger, P, UVA
1997	Florida State	Clemson	Florida Power Park • St. Petersburg, FL	Jeremy Morris, OF, FSU
1998	Wake Forest	Florida State	Durham Bulls Athletic Park • Durham, NC	John Hendricks, P, WF
1999	Wake Forest	Clemson	Durham Bulls Athletic Park • Durham, NC	Andrew Riepe, C, WF
2000	Georgia Tech	Clemson	Knights Stadium • Fort Mill, SC	Jason Basil, OF, GT
2001	Wake Forest	NC State	Knights Stadium • Fort Mill, SC	Dave Bush, P, WF
2002	Florida State	Clemson	Florida Power Park • St. Petersburg, FL	Stephen Drew, SS, FSU
2003	Georgia Tech	NC State	Salem Memorial Baseball Stadium • Salem, VA	Brian Burks, P, GT
2004	Florida State	Georgia Tech	Salem Memorial Baseball Stadium • Salem, VA	Shane Robinson, OF, FSU
2005	Georgia Tech	Virginia	Baseball Grounds of Jacksonville • Jacksonville, FL	Tyler Greene, SS, GT
2006	Clemson	NC State	Baseball Grounds of Jacksonville • Jacksonville, FL	Tyler Colvin, OF, CU
2007	North Carolina	Wake Forest	Baseball Grounds of Jacksonville • Jacksonville, FL	Josh Horton, DH, UNC
2008	Miami (FL)	Virginia	Baseball Grounds of Jacksonville • Jacksonville, FL	Dave DiNatale, OF, UM
2009	Virginia	Florida State	Durham Bulls Athletic Park • Durham, NC	Dan Grovatt, OF, UVA
2010	Florida State	NC State	NewBridge Bank Park • Greensboro, NC	Harold Riggins, 1B, NCSU
2011	Virginia	Florida State	Durham Bulls Athletic Park • Durham, NC	Steven Proscia, 3B, UVA
2012	Georgia Tech	Miami (FL)	NewBridge Bank Park • Greensboro, NC	Jake Davies, 1B/DH/UT, GT
2013	North Carolina	Virginia Tech	Durham Bulls Athletic Park • Durham, NC	Cody Stubbs, 1B, UNC
2014	Georgia Tech	Maryland	NewBridge Bank Park • Greensboro, NC	Dusty Isaacs, P, GT
2015	Florida State	NC State	Durham Bulls Athletic Park • Durham, NC	Boomer Biegalski, P, FSU
2016	Clemson	Florida State	Durham Bulls Athletic Park • Durham, NC	Mike Triller, DH, CU
2017	Florida State	North Carolina	Louisville Slugger Field • Louisville, KY	Jackson Lueck, OF, FSU
2018	Florida State	Lousville	Durham Bulls Athletic Park • Durham, NC	Cal Raleigh, C, FSU
2019	North Carolina	Georgia Tech	Durham Bulls Athletic Park • Durham, NC	Michael Busch, 1B, UNC
2020	Cancelled due to the coronavirus pandemic			
2021	Duke	NC State	Truist Field • Charlotte, NC	Joey Loperfido, OF, DUKE
2022	North Carolina	NC State	Truist Field • Charlotte, NC	Vance Honeycutt, Inf/OF, UNC
2023	Clemson	Miami (FL)	Durham Bulls Athletic Park • Durham, NC	Caden Grice, Utility/P, CU
2024	Duke	Florida State	Truist Field • Charlotte, NC	Devin Obee, OF, Duke
2025	North Carolina	Clemson	Durham Bulls Athletic Park • Durham, NC	Luke Stevenson, C, UNC
2026	Georgia Tech	North Carolina	Truist Field • Charlotte, NC	Ryan Zuckerman, 3B, GT
2027			Durham Bulls Athletic Park • Durham, NC	
2028			Truist Field • Charlotte, NC	
2029			Durham Bulls Athletic Park • Durham, NC	

=== By school ===
All current ACC members with baseball programs have appeared at least once in the tournament. Syracuse, which joined the conference in 2013, has not sponsored varsity baseball since 1972. SMU, which joined the conference in 2025, has not sponsored varsity baseball since 1980.

School	Appearances	W	L	Pct.	Titles	Title Years
Boston College	7	8	9	.471	0	
California	1	2	1	.667	0	
Clemson	52	123	78	.612	11	1976, 1978, 1980, 1981, 1989, 1991, 1993, 1994, 2006, 2016, 2023
Duke	42	38	64	.373	2	2021, 2024
Florida State	33	90	46	.662	8	1995, 1997, 2002, 2004, 2010, 2015, 2017, 2018
Georgia Tech	47	86	74	.538	10	1985, 1986, 1987, 1988, 2000, 2003, 2005, 2012, 2014, 2026
Louisville	10	7	16	.304	0	
Maryland	33	19	54	.260	0	
Miami (FL)	21	29	29	.509	1	2008
NC State	51	94	87	.519	4	1973, 1974, 1975, 1992
North Carolina	50	94	74	.560	9	1982, 1983, 1984, 1990, 2007, 2013, 2019, 2022, 2025
Notre Dame	8	4	13	.235	0	
Pittsburgh	7	7	9	.438	0	
Stanford	1	0	1	.000	0	
Virginia	52	63	83	.432	3	1996, 2009, 2011
Virginia Tech	10	7	14	.333	0	
Wake Forest	47	59	78	.431	4	1977, 1998, 1999, 2001

Italics indicate school is no longer a member of the ACC.
Updated through 2025
