= 1983 Atlantic Coast Conference baseball tournament =

American college baseball tournament

- Teams: 8
- Format: Eight-team double elimination
- Finals site: Boshamer Stadium; Chapel Hill, North Carolina
- Champions: North Carolina (2nd title)
- Winning coach: Mike Roberts (2nd title)
- MVP: Scott Bankhead (North Carolina)
- Attendance: 13,500

1983 Atlantic Coast Conference baseball standings
	Conf.				Overall
Team	W		L	PCT	W		L	PCT
No. 25 North Carolina ‍†‍‡‍^{y}	10	–	2	.833	42	–	10	.808
NC State ‍‍‍	9	–	4	.692	23	–	13	.639
Clemson ‍‍‍	6	–	5	.545	30	–	20	.600
Wake Forest ‍‍‍	5	–	6	.455	17	–	18	.486
Georgia Tech ‍‍‍	6	–	8	.429	38	–	15	.717
Maryland ‍‍‍	4	–	6	.400	14	–	19	.424
Virginia ‍‍‍	4	–	6	.400	12	–	25	.324
Duke ‍‍‍	1	–	8	.111	14	–	12	.538
† – Conference champion ‡ – Tournament champion y – Invited to the NCAA tournament As of June 30, 1983; Rankings from Collegiate Baseball

The 1983 Atlantic Coast Conference baseball tournament was the 1983 postseason baseball championship of the NCAA Division I Atlantic Coast Conference, held at Boshamer Stadium in Chapel Hill, North Carolina, from April 20 through 25. North Carolina defeated Clemson in the championship game, earning the conference's automatic bid to the 1983 NCAA Division I baseball tournament.

== Format ==
All eight ACC teams qualified for the eight-team double-elimination tournament.

=== Seeding procedure ===
From TheACC.com:

On Saturday (The Semifinals) of the ACC baseball tournament, the match-up between the four remaining teams is determined by previous opponents. If teams have played previously in the tournament, every attempt will be made to avoid a repeat match-up between teams, regardless of seed. If it is impossible to avoid a match-up that already occurred, then the determination is based on avoiding the most recent, current tournament match-up, regardless of seed. If no match-ups have occurred, the team left in the winners bracket will play the lowest seeded team from the losers bracket.

== Regular season results ==
Team	W	L	PCT	GB	Seed
North Carolina	10	2	.833	–	1
NC State	9	4	.692	1.5	2
Clemson	6	5	.545	3.5	3
Wake Forest	5	6	.455	4.5	4
Maryland	4	6	.400	5	5
Virginia	4	6	.400	5	6
Georgia Tech	6	8	.429	5	7
Duke	1	8	.111	7.5	8

== Tournament ==
Upper round 1
8	Duke	2
1	North Carolina	4
5	Maryland	11
4	Wake Forest	1
6	Virginia	5
3	Clemson	12
7	Georgia Tech	7
2	NC State	10

Upper round 2
1	North Carolina	13
5	Maryland	11
2	NC State	1
3	Clemson	8
Lower round 1
4	Wake Forest	13
8	Duke	14
6	Virginia	8
7	Georgia Tech	1

Upper final
3	Clemson	5
1	North Carolina	6
Lower round 2
8	Duke	7
2	NC State	2
5	Maryland	2
6	Virginia	5

Semifinals
3	Clemson	14
8	Duke	7
1	North Carolina	5
6	Virginia	4

Final
1	North Carolina	2	10
3	Clemson	5	1

== See also ==
- College World Series
- NCAA Division I Baseball Championship
- Atlantic Coast Conference baseball tournament
