= 1985 Atlantic Coast Conference baseball tournament =

American college baseball tournament

- Teams: 8
- Format: Eight-team double elimination
- Finals site: Russ Chandler Stadium; Atlanta, Georgia
- Champions: Georgia Tech (1st title)
- Winning coach: Jim Morris (1st title)
- MVP: Scott Jordan (Georgia Tech)
- Attendance: 8,954

1985 Atlantic Coast Conference baseball standings
	Conf.						Overall
Team	W		L		T	PCT	W		L		T	PCT
Clemson ‍†‍‍	9	–	4	–	0	.692	36	–	30	–	1	.545
North Carolina ‍†‍‍	9	–	4	–	0	.692	40	–	17	–	0	.702
No. 23 Virginia ‍†‍‍^{y}	9	–	4	–	0	.692	38	–	16	–	0	.704
NC State ‍‍‍	8	–	5	–	0	.615	29	–	16	–	0	.644
No. 17 Georgia Tech ‍‍‡‍^{y}	6	–	7	–	0	.462	42	–	19	–	0	.689
Duke ‍‍‍	5	–	8	–	0	.385	18	–	15	–	0	.545
Maryland ‍‍‍	5	–	8	–	0	.385	22	–	28	–	0	.440
Wake Forest ‍‍‍	1	–	12	–	0	.077	23	–	23	–	0	.500
† – Conference champion ‡ – Tournament champion y – Invited to the NCAA tournament As of June 30, 1985; Rankings from Collegiate Baseball

The 1985 Atlantic Coast Conference baseball tournament was the 1985 postseason baseball championship of the NCAA Division I Atlantic Coast Conference, held at Russ Chandler Stadium in Atlanta, Georgia, from May 17 through 20. Georgia Tech defeated Clemson in the championship game, earning the conference's automatic bid to the 1985 NCAA Division I baseball tournament.

== Format ==
All eight ACC teams qualified for the eight-team double-elimination tournament.

=== Seeding procedure ===
From TheACC.com:

On Saturday (The Semifinals) of the ACC baseball tournament, the match-up between the four remaining teams is determined by previous opponents. If teams have played previously in the tournament, every attempt will be made to avoid a repeat match-up between teams, regardless of seed. If it is impossible to avoid a match-up that already occurred, then the determination is based on avoiding the most recent, current tournament match-up, regardless of seed. If no match-ups have occurred, the team left in the winners bracket will play the lowest seeded team from the losers bracket.

== Regular season results ==
Team	W	L	PCT	GB	Seed
Virginia	9	4	.692	–	1
Clemson	9	4	.692	–	2
North Carolina	9	4	.692	–	3
NC State	8	5	.615	1	4
Georgia Tech	6	7	.462	3	5
Duke	5	8	.385	4	6
Maryland	5	8	.385	4	7
Wake Forest	1	12	.077	8	8

== Tournament ==
Upper round 1
8	Wake Forest	9
1	Virginia	4
5	Georgia Tech	23
4	NC State	11
6	Duke	2
3	North Carolina	15
7	Maryland	12
2	Clemson	17

Upper round 2
5	Georgia Tech	15
8	Wake Forest	11
2	Clemson	3
3	North Carolina	2
Lower round 1
1	Virginia	7
4	NC State	0
7	Maryland	12
6	Duke	1

Upper final
2	Clemson	5
5	Georgia Tech	7
Lower round 2
3	North Carolina	3
1	Virginia	10
8	Wake Forest	1
7	Maryland	10

Semifinals
5	Georgia Tech	8
7	Maryland	2
1	Virginia	8
2	Clemson	10

Final
2	Clemson	5
5	Georgia Tech	7

== See also ==
- College World Series
- NCAA Division I Baseball Championship
- Atlantic Coast Conference baseball tournament
