= 1981 Atlantic Coast Conference baseball tournament =

American college baseball tournament

- Teams: 8
- Format: Eight-team double-elimination tournament
- Finals site: Boshamer Stadium; Chapel Hill, North Carolina
- Champions: Clemson (4th title)
- Winning coach: Bill Wilhelm (4th title)
- Attendance: 14,070

1981 Atlantic Coast Conference baseball standings
	Conf.				Overall
Team	W		L	PCT	W		L	PCT
Clemson ‍†‍‡‍^{y}	10	–	4	.714	34	–	24	.586
NC State ‍†‍‍	10	–	4	.714	33	–	12	.733
Maryland ‍‍‍	7	–	3	.700	23	–	13	.639
Virginia ‍‍‍	8	–	5	.615	28	–	20	.583
Duke ‍‍‍	6	–	6	.500	29	–	10	.744
North Carolina ‍‍‍	6	–	7	.462	38	–	15	.717
Wake Forest ‍‍‍	3	–	9	.250	17	–	13	.567
Georgia Tech ‍‍‍	1	–	13	.071	14	–	24	.368
† – Conference champion ‡ – Tournament champion y – Invited to the NCAA tournament As of June 30, 1981; Rankings from Collegiate Baseball

The 1981 Atlantic Coast Conference baseball tournament was held in Chapel Hill, North Carolina, from April 22 through April 26. Clemson won the tournament and earned the Atlantic Coast Conference's automatic bid to the 1981 NCAA Division I baseball tournament.

== Tournament ==
Upper round 1
8	Georgia Tech	6
1	Clemson	7
5	Duke	4
4	Virginia	3
6	North Carolina	9
3	Maryland	2
7	Wake Forest	0
2	NC State	2

Upper round 2
1	Clemson	0
5	Duke	1
2	NC State	1
6	North Carolina	7
Lower round 1
4	Virginia	2
8	Georgia Tech	5
3	Maryland	2
7	Wake Forest	3

Upper final
5	Duke	5
6	North Carolina	8
Lower round 2
8	Georgia Tech	6
2	NC State	9
7	Wake Forest	5
1	Clemson	6

Semifinals
6	North Carolina	4
1	Clemson	7
2	NC State	7
5	Duke	11

Preliminary final
1	Clemson	9
5	Duke	2

Final
1	Clemson	7
6	North Carolina	5

== See also ==
- College World Series
- NCAA Division I Baseball Championship
