= Mike Roberts (baseball) =

American baseball player and coach

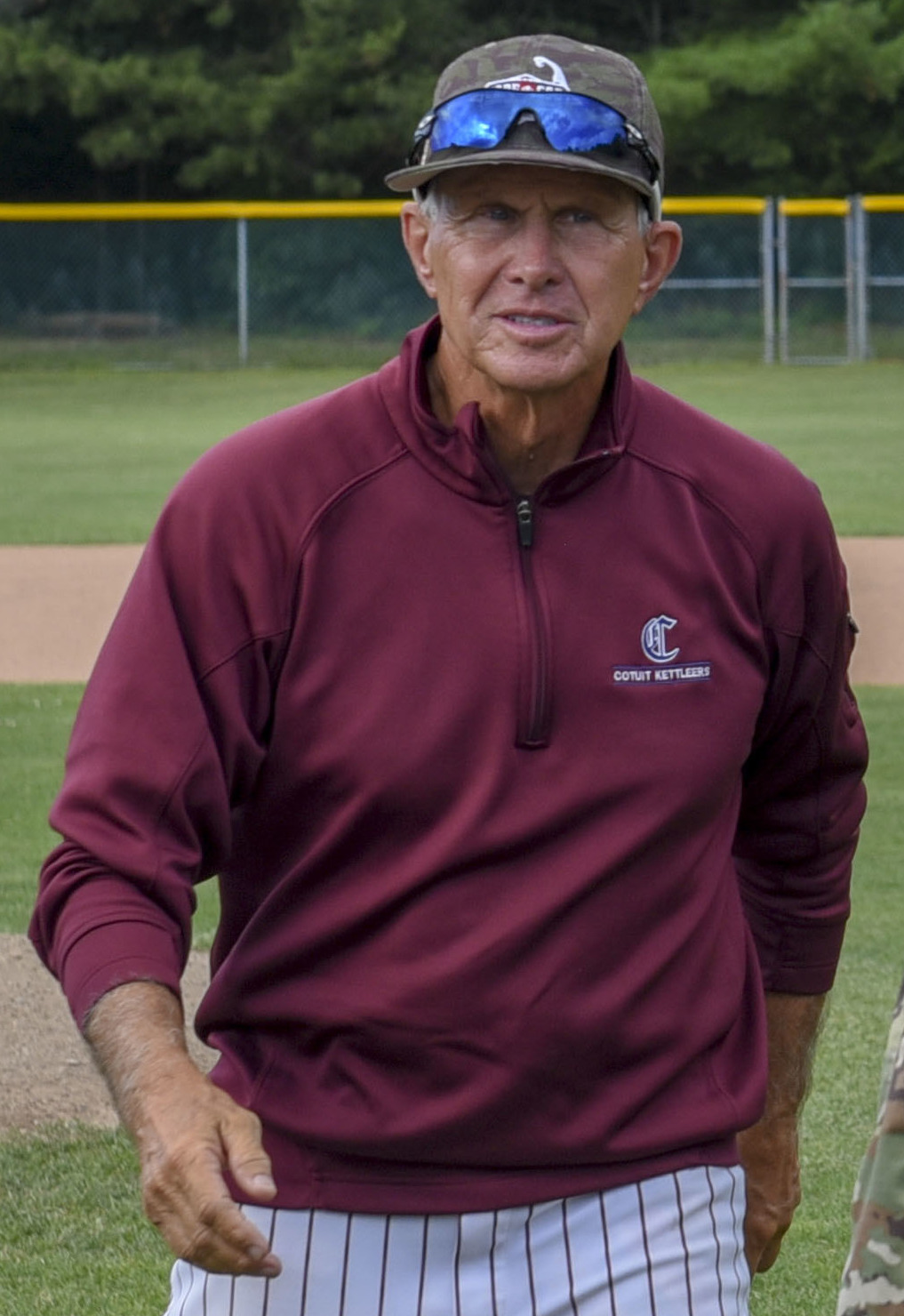
- Roberts with the Cotuit Kettleers in 2019

Biographical details
- Born: March 1, 1950 (age 75); Asheville, North Carolina, U.S.

Playing career
- 1970–1972: North Carolina
- Position: Catcher

Coaching career (HC unless noted)
- 1978–1998: North Carolina
- 1999: UNC Asheville

Head coaching record
- Overall: 780–428–3 (.645)

Accomplishments and honors

Awards
- All-Atlantic Coast Conference (1970–1972)

Thomas Michael Roberts (born March 1, 1950) is an American former professional baseball player and college baseball coach. He played for the North Carolina Tar Heels from 1970 through 1972, and then in Minor League Baseball in 1972 and 1973. He returned to the Tar Heels as their coach, serving in the role from 1978 through 1998. His son, Brian Roberts, played Major League Baseball.

== Early life and career ==
Roberts attended Dobyns-Bennett High School in Kingsport, Tennessee, and the University of North Carolina at Chapel Hill. At North Carolina, he played college baseball for the North Carolina Tar Heels baseball team as a catcher. A member of the Tar Heels from 1970 through 1972, Roberts was named All-Atlantic Coast Conference in all three seasons.

The Kansas City Royals selected Roberts in the 34th round of the 1972 MLB draft. He played for the Royals' organization in Minor League Baseball in 1972 for the Billings Mustangs of the Rookie-level Pioneer League, and in 1973 for the Waterloo Royals of the Class A Midwest League.

Roberts became the head coach of the Tar Heels in 1978, and held the position through 1998. Roberts then coached for the UNC Asheville Bulldogs for one season.

In 1984 and again in 2000, Roberts managed the Wareham Gatemen, a collegiate summer baseball team in the prestigious Cape Cod Baseball League (CCBL). In 2004, he returned to the CCBL to become manager of the Cotuit Kettleers. Roberts has led the Kettleers to league championship titles in 2010, 2013, and 2019, and has managed several future major leaguers at Cotuit such as Yan Gomes, Charlie Blackmon, and Bradley Zimmer.

On October 28, 2025, Roberts was announced as the head coach of the Grand Lake Mariners. The Mariners are based in Celina, Ohio, and participate in the Great Lakes Summer Collegiate League.

== Personal ==
Roberts' son, Brian Roberts, played for him on the Tar Heels and went on to play in Major League Baseball.
