= NC State Wolfpack baseball =

Baseball team representing North Carolina State University

- 2026 NC State Wolfpack baseball team
- Founded: 1903; 123 years ago
- University: North Carolina State University
- Athletic director: Boo Corrigan
- Head coach: Chris Hart (1st season)
- Conference: ACC; Atlantic Division
- Location: Raleigh, North Carolina
- Home stadium: Doak Field (capacity: 3,000)
- Nickname: Wolfpack
- Colors: Red and white

College World Series appearances
- 1968, 2013, 2021, 2024

NCAA regional champions
- 2003, 2008, 2012, 2013, 2021, 2024

NCAA tournament appearances
- 1968, 1973, 1974, 1975, 1986, 1987, 1988, 1990, 1991, 1992, 1993, 1994, 1996, 1997, 1998, 1999, 2003, 2004, 2005, 2006, 2007, 2008, 2010, 2011, 2012, 2013, 2015, 2016, 2017, 2018, 2019, 2021, 2023, 2024, 2025, 2026

Conference tournament champions
- 1973, 1974, 1975, 1992

Conference regular season champions
- 1968, 1975, 1981, 1986

The NC State Wolfpack baseball team is the varsity intercollegiate baseball program of North Carolina State University, based in Raleigh, North Carolina, United States. The team has been a member of the Atlantic Coast Conference since the conference's founding in the 1954 season. The program's home venue is Doak Field, which opened in 1966. Longtime assistant coach Chris Hart will take over as head coach in 2027 following the retirement of Elliott Avent, who has been the head coach of the team since prior to the 1997 season. As of the end of 2025 world series, the Wolfpack have appeared in four College World Series and 35 NCAA tournaments. They have won four ACC tournament Championships and four ACC Regular season Championships. As of the 2021 Major League Baseball season, 47 former Wolfpack players have played in Major League Baseball.

== History ==
The baseball program played its first official game against Guilford College in 1894. The program began varsity play in 1903, playing at Riddick Stadium, and in 1907 won its first State Championship. The program competed in each season until 1914, when the program was discontinued for three seasons (1914–1916) before being revived prior to the 1917 season.

The team's nickname was the "Farmers" until autumn 1921, when an alumnus complained that the behavior of some of the school's football players was "as unruly as a pack of wolves." Subsequently, newspapers began referring to the school's athletic teams as the "Wolfpack."

The program's current venue, Doak Field, opened in 1966.

NC State made its first College World Series appearance in 1968, in the second season of head coach Sammy Esposito's tenure. In the World Series, the team lost in the semifinals to eventual champion USC. Since the NCAA tournament's format was changed in 1999 to include the Super Regional round, NC State has appeared in five Super Regionals, losing to Miami in 2003, Georgia in 2008, and Florida in 2012, beating Rice in 2013, and Arkansas in 2021.

The Wolfpack have hosted five NCAA Regionals, one at Wilson, North Carolina's Fleming Stadium (in 2003) and four at Doak Field (in 2008, 2012, 2013, 2016).

=== Conference affiliations ===
- Independent − 1903–1913, 1917–1921
- Southern Conference − 1922–1953
- Atlantic Coast Conference − 1954–present

== 2021 College World Series ==
NC State was put into the Ruston Regional as a 2 seed where they cruised right on through not losing a single game. They then moved on to face the #1 team in the country, the Arkansas Razorbacks. Arkansas destroyed NC State game one 21-2. The Wolfpack then bounced back to win the next two games (each by one run).

The Wolfpack went into Omaha and faced off against the 9 seeded Stanford Cardinal. NC State breezed by Stanford, winning 10-4. They moved on to face the 4 seeded Vanderbilt Commodores. The Wolfpack went in facing the top pitcher in the country, Jack Leiter. NC State would only score off a home run by Terrell Tatum. That proved to be all they needed as they won 1-0, despite Leiter striking out 15 batters in 8 innings. Then they faced the Commodores again in the next matchup where they lost 3-1. However, before they could play the elimination game, many of the NC State players contracted the COVID-19 virus. They did not have enough players to field a team of baseball players, so they had to forfeit the game. That ended their magical postseason run and hopes of winning the program's first ever national title.

== Venues ==
=== Riddick Stadium ===
Prior to 1966, the team played at Riddick Stadium, which was also home to the NC State football program.

=== Doak Field ===
The Wolfpack's home venue is Doak Field, which opened in 1966 and has a capacity of 3,000 spectators. The field is named for Charles Doak, who was the program's head coach from 1924 to 1939.

== Head coaches ==
The program's most successful head coach was Sammy Esposito. Esposito coached teams to four ACC regular season championships, three ACC tournament championships, and one College World Series appearance in his 21-year tenure.

Elliot Avent is the program's leader in total career victories at NC State, with 1,101 as of May 31, 2026. Avent became the program's winningest coach on May 9, 2010, in a 21–0 NC State win over Towson. The win was Avent's 514th, putting him past Sammy Esposito on the program's career wins list.

Coach Avent is also the program's longest tenured head coach, with 30 seasons in the position. Vic Sorrell and Sammy Esposito each served as head coach for 21 seasons.

Year(s)	Coach	Seasons	W-L-T	Pct
1903–1904	C. D. Welch	2	20–15–0	.571
1905–1906	M. J. Kittredge	2	16–12–0	.571
1907	W. W. "Win" Clark	1	14–8–0	.636
1908–1911	Frank Thompson	4	70–16–4	.800
1912	Edward Green	1	13–6–1	.675
1913	Fred Anderson	1	6–0–0	1.000
1917–1918, 1921–1923	Harry Hartsell	5	52–37–4	.581
1919	Tal Stafford	1	12–11–0	.522
1920	Bill Fetzer	1	14–6–0	.700
1924–1939	Charles Doak	16	147–129–6	.533
1940–1944	Williams Newton	5	16–50–0	.242
1945	Beattie Feathers	1	7–6–0	.538
1946–1966	Vic Sorrell	21	223–196–5	.532
1967–1987	Sammy Esposito	21	513–253–4	.669
1988–1996	Ray Tanner	9	395–173–3	.694
1997–2026	Elliott Avent	30	1,101–659	.626
Totals	16	110	2,619–1,576–27	.624

== Yearly record ==
Wolfpack Baseball Yearly record

Record table
Season	Coach	Overall	Conference	Standing	Postseason
Independent (1903–1913)
1903	C. D. Welch	10–3			
1904	C. D. Welch	10–12			
1905	M. J. Kittredge	10–5			
1906	M. J. Kittredge	6–7			
1907	Win Clark	14–8			State Champions
1908	Frank Thompson	21–4			
1909	Frank Thompson	16–8–1			
1910	Frank Thompson	15–1–3			
1911	Frank Thompson	18–3			
1912	Edward Green	13–6–1			
1913	Fred Anderson	6–0–0			
No program (1914–1916)
Independent (1917–1921)
1917	Harry Hartsell	5–8			
1918	Harry Hartsell	11–5–1			
1919	Tal Stafford	12–11			
1920	Bill Fetzer	14–6			
1921	Harry Hartsell	10–10–2			
Independent:		191-97-8			
Southern Conference (1922–1953)
1922	Harry Hartsell	13–7			
1923	Harry Hartsell	13–7–1			
1924	Charles Doak	18–4			
1925	Charles Doak	14–4			
1926	Charles Doak	7–13			
1927	Charles Doak	2–10			
1928	Charles Doak	12–6			
1929	Charles Doak	9–9			
1930	Charles Doak	8–10–1			
1931	Charles Doak	11–8			
1932	Charles Doak	7–6–2			
1933	Charles Doak	9–4			
1934	Charles Doak	9–11–1			
1935	Charles Doak	10–9			
1936	Charles Doak	11–8			
1937	Charles Doak	7–12			
1938	Charles Doak	8–7–2			
1939	Charles Doak	5–8			
1940	Williams Newton	3–9			
1941	Williams Newton	3–10			
1942	Williams Newton	6–9			
1943	Williams Newton	3–10			
1944	Williams Newton	1–12			
1945	Beattie Feathers	7–6			
1946	Vic Sorrell	11–4			
1947	Vic Sorrell	9–13			
1948	Vic Sorrell	8–13–1			
1949	Vic Sorrell	8–12			
1950	Vic Sorrell	16–9			
1951	Vic Sorrell	10–10			
1952	Vic Sorrell	15–10			
1953	Vic Sorrell	11–9			
Southern:		284-279-8			
Atlantic Coast Conference (1954–present)
1954	Vic Sorrell	8–8	8–6	3rd	
1955	Vic Sorrell	13–4	12–3	2nd	
1956	Vic Sorrell	14–5–1	11–4	2nd	
1957	Vic Sorrell	8–10	7–7	4th	
1958	Vic Sorrell	10–7	6–7	5th	
1959	Vic Sorrell	8–12	5–9	8th	
1960	Vic Sorrell	12–8	9–5	3rd	
1961	Vic Sorrell	13–5	8–5	4th	
1962	Vic Sorrell	11–10	8–6	t–3rd	
1963	Vic Sorrell	9–10	4–10	7th	
1964	Vic Sorrell	8–15	4–9	7th	
1965	Vic Sorrell	10–10–1	6–8	t–5th	
1966	Vic Sorrell	11–12–2	7–7	t–3rd	
1967	Sammy Esposito	11–11	6–7	5th	
1968	Sammy Esposito	25–9	13–4	1st	College World Series
1969	Sammy Esposito	17–11	9–9	4th	
1970	Sammy Esposito	21–10	13–8	3rd	
1971	Sammy Esposito	18–11–1	9–5	3rd	
1972	Sammy Esposito	19–13	7–8	4th	
1973	Sammy Esposito	23–10–1	9–3	2nd	District 3 Regionals
1974	Sammy Esposito	22–10	7–5	3rd	District 3 Regionals
1975	Sammy Esposito	27–7	10–2	t–1st	Atlantic Regional
1976	Sammy Esposito	20–12	6–6	4th	ACC tournament
1977	Sammy Esposito	27–12	5–5	t–4th	ACC tournament
1978	Sammy Esposito	23–16	5–7	5th	ACC tournament
1979	Sammy Esposito	23–13	3–9	6th	
1980	Sammy Esposito	21–12	7–6	4th	ACC tournament
1981	Sammy Esposito	33–12	10–4	t–1st	ACC tournament
1982	Sammy Esposito	24–14	7–7	4th	ACC tournament
1983	Sammy Esposito	23–13–1	9–4	2nd	ACC tournament
1984	Sammy Esposito	32–8	9–3	3rd	ACC tournament
1985	Sammy Esposito	29–16	8–5	4th	ACC tournament
1986	Sammy Esposito	35–15	11–2	1st	South II Regional
1987	Sammy Esposito	39–16	12–8	4th	Mideast Regional
1988	Ray Tanner	45–16	13–6	2nd	East Regional
1989	Ray Tanner	35–21–2	10–10	4th	ACC tournament
1990	Ray Tanner	48–20	14–7	3rd	Atlantic Regional
1991	Ray Tanner	48–20	11–10	3rd	East Regional
1992	Ray Tanner	46–18	15–9	3rd	Atlantic Regional
1993	Ray Tanner	49–17	15–7	2nd	Midwest Regional
1994	Ray Tanner	46–18–1	13–11	5th	Mideast Regional
1995	Ray Tanner	36–24	14–14	6th	ACC tournament
1996	Ray Tanner	42–19	14–13	t–3rd	East Regional
1997	Elliott Avent	43–20	15–8	3rd	South II Regional
1998	Elliott Avent	41–23	12–9	4th	West Regional
1999	Elliott Avent	37–25	11–13	6th	Auburn Regional
2000	Elliott Avent	30–28	10–14	t–6th	ACC tournament
2001	Elliott Avent	32–28	9–15	t–7th	ACC tournament
2002	Elliott Avent	33–26	7–17	7th	ACC tournament
2003	Elliott Avent	45–18	15–9	t–3rd	Coral Gables Super Regional
2004	Elliott Avent	36–24	11–12	6th	Coral Gables Regional
2005	Elliott Avent	41–19	17–13	6th	Lincoln Regional
2006	Elliott Avent	40–23	16–13	t–2nd (Atlantic)	Austin Regional
2007	Elliott Avent	38–23	16–14	3rd (Atlantic)	Columbia, SC Regional
2008	Elliott Avent	42–22	18–11	2nd (Atlantic)	Athens Super Regional
2009	Elliott Avent	25–31	10–20	t–4th (Atlantic)	
2010	Elliott Avent	38–24	15–15	3rd (Atlantic)	Myrtle Beach Regional
2011	Elliott Avent	35–27	15–15	t–3rd (Atlantic)	Columbia Regional
2012	Elliott Avent	43–20	19–11	2nd (Atlantic)	Gainesville Super Regional
2013	Elliott Avent	50–16	19–10	2nd (Atlantic)	College World Series
2014	Elliott Avent	32–23	13–17	5th (Atlantic)	ACC tournament
2015	Elliott Avent	36–22	15–14	5th (Atlantic)	Fort Worth Regional
2016	Elliott Avent	36–22	15–14	3rd (Atlantic)	Raleigh Regional
2017	Elliott Avent	36–25	16–14	4th (Atlantic)	Lexington Regional
2018	Elliott Avent	42–18	19–11	3rd (Atlantic)	Raleigh Regional
2019	Elliott Avent	42–19	18–12	t-3rd (Atlantic)	Greenville Regional
2020	Elliott Avent	14–3	1–2	t-8th (Atlantic)	Canceled for Covid-19
2021	Elliott Avent	37–18	19–14	3rd Atlantic)	College World Series
2022	Elliott Avent	36–21	14–15	5th (Atlantic)	
2023	Elliott Avent	36–21	13–16	5th (Atlantic)	Columbia Regional
2024	Elliott Avent	38–21	18–11	2nd (Atlantic)	College World Series
ACC:		2,078–1,150–10	739–606		
Total:		2,589–1,556–27			
National champion Postseason invitational champion Conference regular season champion Conference regular season and conference tournament champion Division regular season champion Division regular season and conference tournament champion Conference tournament champion

== Individual awards ==
=== National awards ===
Brooks Wallace Award

- Trea Turner (2014)

Richard W. "Dick" Case Award

- Carlos Rodon (2013)

=== Conference awards ===
ACC Baseball Player of the Year

- Chris Cammack (1969)
- Mike Caldwell (baseball) (1971)
- Tracy Woodson (1984)
- Turtle Zaun (1988)

ACC Baseball Coach of the Year

- Sammy Esposito (1984)
- Sammy Esposito (1986)
- Ray Tanner (1990)
- Elliott Avent (2003)

ACC Baseball Rookie of the Year

- Tom Sergio (1994)
- Carlos Rodon (2012)
- Patrick Bailey (2018)
- Tommy White (baseball) (2022)

ACC Baseball Pitcher of the Year

- Carlos Rodon (2012)
- Brian Brown (2018)

== Notable players ==
Below is a list of notable players of the program and the seasons in which they played for the Wolfpack.

- Patrick Bailey (2017-2020)
- Andy Barkett (1992–1995)
- Brian Bark (1987–1990)
- Aaron Bates (2005–2006)
- Greg Briley (1986)
- Jimmy Brown (1932)
- Dick Burrus (1919)
- Mike Caldwell (1968–1971)
- Doug Davis (1982–1984)
- Joe DeBerry (1917–1920)
- Joey Devine (2003–2005)
- Bill Evans (1915)
- Adam Everett (1996)
- Stu Flythe (1934–1936)
- Jeff Hartsock (1986–1988)
- Dutch Holland (1923–1925)
- Andrew Knizner (2014-2016)
- Johnny Lanning (1931–1932)
- Corey Lee (1994–1996)
- Matt Mangini (2005–2006)
- Jim McNamara (1984–86)
- Louie Meadows (1980–82)
- George Murray (1918–21)
- Chad Orvella (2002–2003)
- Chink Outen (1927–1928)
- Jeff Pierce (1990–1991)
- Dan Plesac (1981–1983)
- Buck Redfern (1921–1924)
- Dave Robertson (1910–1912)
- Carlos Rodon (2012–2014)
- Tommy Smith (1972–1974)
- Tim Stoddard (1972–1975)
- Doug Strange (1983–1985)
- Eric Surkamp (2006)
- Jim Toman (1981–1984)
- Trea Turner (2012–2014)
- Russell Wilson (2008–2010)
- Will Wilson (2016–2019)
- Tracy Woodson (1982–1984)

=== Current MLB Roster ===
Former Wolfpack players on current MLB rosters as of August 14, 2023.

Player	Position	Number	Team
Patrick Bailey	C	14	San Francisco Giants
Andrew Knizner	C	7	St. Louis Cardinals
Carlos Rodon	P	16	San Francisco Giants
Trea Turner	SS	6	Philadelphia Phillies

== Major League Baseball draft ==
=== 2012 ===
In the 2012 Major League Baseball draft, two NC State players were selected. Junior shortstop Chris Diaz was selected in the 11th round by the Pittsburgh Pirates, and senior outfielder Ryan Mathews was selected in the 27th round by the Oakland Athletics. Both players signed contracts with their respective organizations.

=== 2014 ===
In the 2014 Major League Baseball draft, two NC State players were selected in the first round. Junior pitcher Carlos Rodon was selected 3rd overall in the 1st round by the Chicago White Sox, and shortstop Trea Turner was selected 13th overall by the San Diego Padres.

== See also ==
- List of NCAA Division I baseball programs
