= North Carolina Tar Heels baseball =

American college baseball team

North Carolina Tar Heels
- 2026 North Carolina Tar Heels baseball team
- Founded: 1867; 159 years ago
- University: University of North Carolina at Chapel Hill
- Head coach: Scott Forbes (6th season)
- Conference: ACC
- Location: Chapel Hill, North Carolina
- Home stadium: Bryson Field at Boshamer Stadium (capacity: 5,000)
- Nickname: Tar Heels
- Colors: Carolina blue and white

College World Series runner-up
- 2006, 2007, 2026

College World Series appearances
- 1960, 1966, 1978, 1989, 2006, 2007, 2008, 2009, 2011, 2013, 2018, 2024, 2026

NCAA regional champions
- 1978, 1989, 2003, 2006, 2007, 2008, 2009, 2011, 2013, 2018, 2019, 2022, 2024, 2025, 2026

NCAA tournament appearances
- 1948, 1960, 1964, 1966, 1969, 1978, 1982, 1983, 1984, 1989, 1990, 1993, 1995, 1998, 1999, 2000, 2002, 2003, 2004, 2005, 2006, 2007, 2008, 2009, 2010, 2011, 2012, 2013, 2014, 2017, 2018, 2019, 2021, 2022, 2023, 2024, 2025, 2026

Conference tournament champions
- 1982, 1983, 1984, 1990, 2007, 2013, 2019, 2022, 2025

Conference regular season champions
- 1901, 1922, 1933, 1934, 1948, 1960, 1964, 1966, 1969, 1980, 1983, 1984, 1989, 1990, 2013, 2024

The North Carolina Tar Heels baseball team, commonly referred to as Carolina or the Diamond Heels, represents the University of North Carolina at Chapel Hill in NCAA Division I college baseball. They compete in the Coastal Division of the Atlantic Coast Conference. The Tar Heels play their home games on campus at Boshamer Stadium, and are currently coached by Scott Forbes.

== History ==
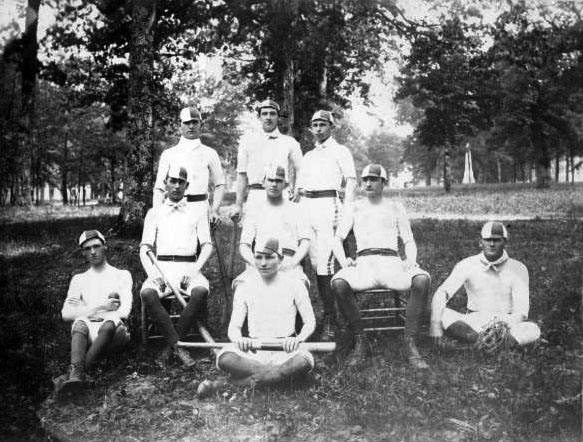
North Carolina Tar Heels baseball team, 1885

The program's first recorded game took place in 1867, when the Tar Heels defeated a Raleigh all-star team, 34-17. Although baseball continued to be played at UNC, there exists a gap in record-keeping during Reconstruction, despite the noted existence of the UNC baseball team. The program's next recorded games were played in 1891. Thereafter, the University sponsored a varsity intercollegiate baseball program on a regular basis from that season onwards.

In 1921, the University of North Carolina became a founding member of the Southern Conference. Bunny Hearn became head coach of the Tar Heel baseball program in 1932, serving in that capacity for the next 15 years. The Tar Heels would win six Southern Conference baseball titles during the Hearn era, as well as two wartime Ration League titles in 1943 and 1945. In 1947, Hearn suffered a stroke and chose to relinquish his head coaching duties. Walter Rabb would thereafter take over as head coach of the Tar Heel baseball program, though Hearn remained as a coach at North Carolina for another ten years.

During the 1948 season, the program qualified for its first NCAA tournament, which had first been played in 1947. North Carolina's record in the tournament was 1-2.

North Carolina left the Southern Conference in 1953, opting to become a founding member of the newly formed Atlantic Coast Conference. The Tar Heels won their first ACC baseball title in 1960. The program's first College World Series appearance also came in 1960. In 1964, the Tar Heels won their second ACC baseball title, posting an undefeated record in conference play. No other team in ACC baseball history has ever been undefeated in conference play.

The Tar Heels would appear in the College World Series three more times during the 20th century.

In 1999, a booster club named the Diamond Heels Club formed to support the program and fundraise for improvements to Boshamer Stadium. Since then, many refer to the team using the "Diamond Heels" nickname to distinguish it from other UNC athletic teams.

The Tar Heels reached the College World Series in four consecutive years between 2006 and 2009, and five times in six years between 2006 and 2011. They reached the national championship series in both 2006 and 2007, but lost on both occasions to the Oregon State Beavers. The Tar Heels made a third straight trip to Omaha in 2008.

While Boshamer Stadium was being renovated and rebuilt during the 2008 season, the Tar Heels played their home games at the USA Baseball National Training Complex in nearby Cary. The Tar Heels returned to Chapel Hill in February 2009, following the completion of the extensive renovations to Boshamer Stadium. The Tar Heels reached the 2009 College World Series, the program's fourth consecutive College World Series appearance, following their first season playing in newly renovated Boshamer Stadium.

The Tar Heels once again reached the College World Series in 2011. The Tar Heels were the top overall seed in the 2013 NCAA baseball tournament, during which they reached the 2013 College World Series once again. In 2018, the Tar Heels reached the College World Series for the seventh time in thirteen seasons.

In 2024 and 2026, Forbes lead the Tar Heels to the College World Series. In 2026, they reached the championship series, where they lost to the Oklahoma Sooners in three games.

=== Head coaches ===
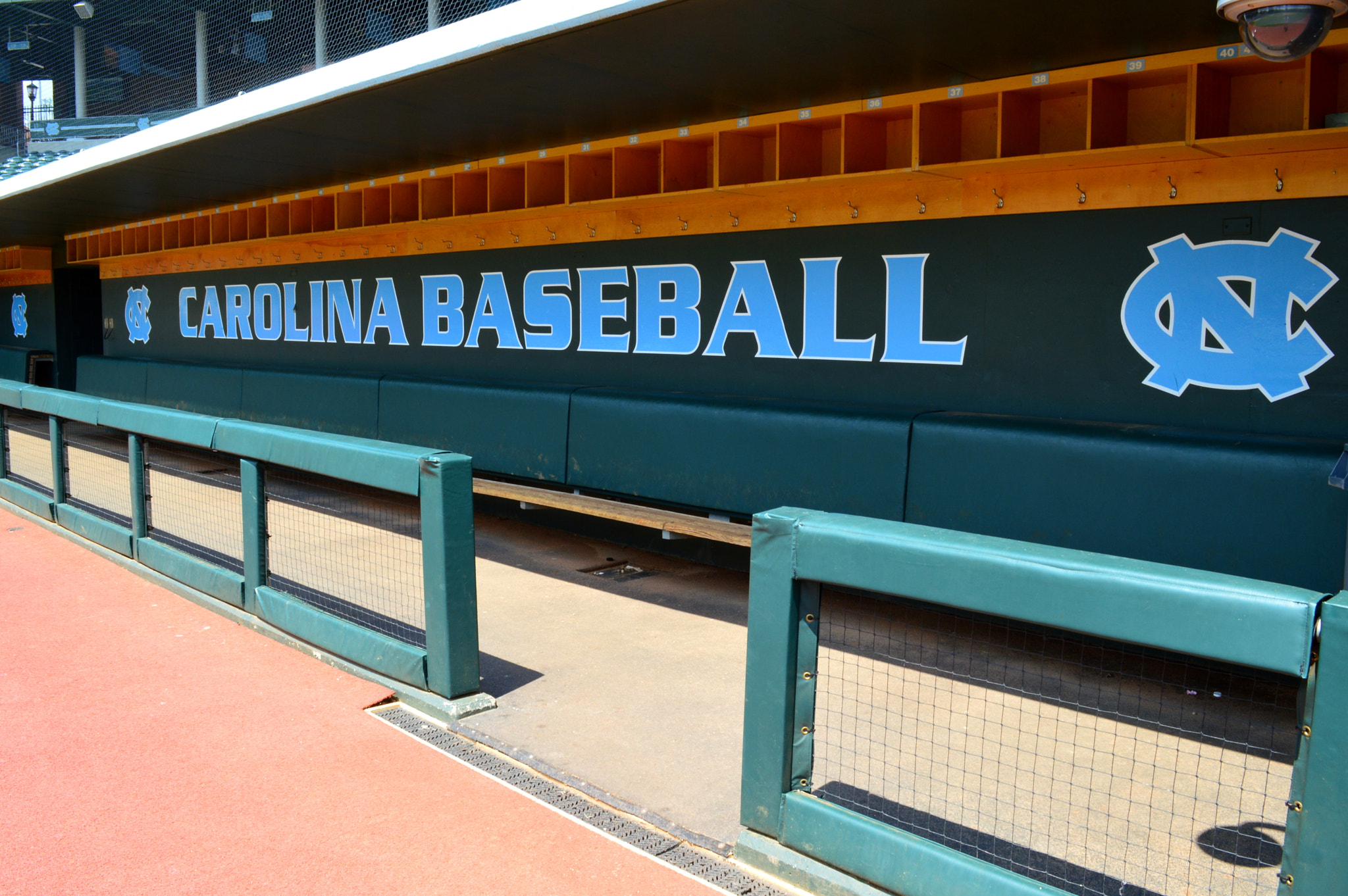
Carolina Baseball dugout at Boshamer Stadium

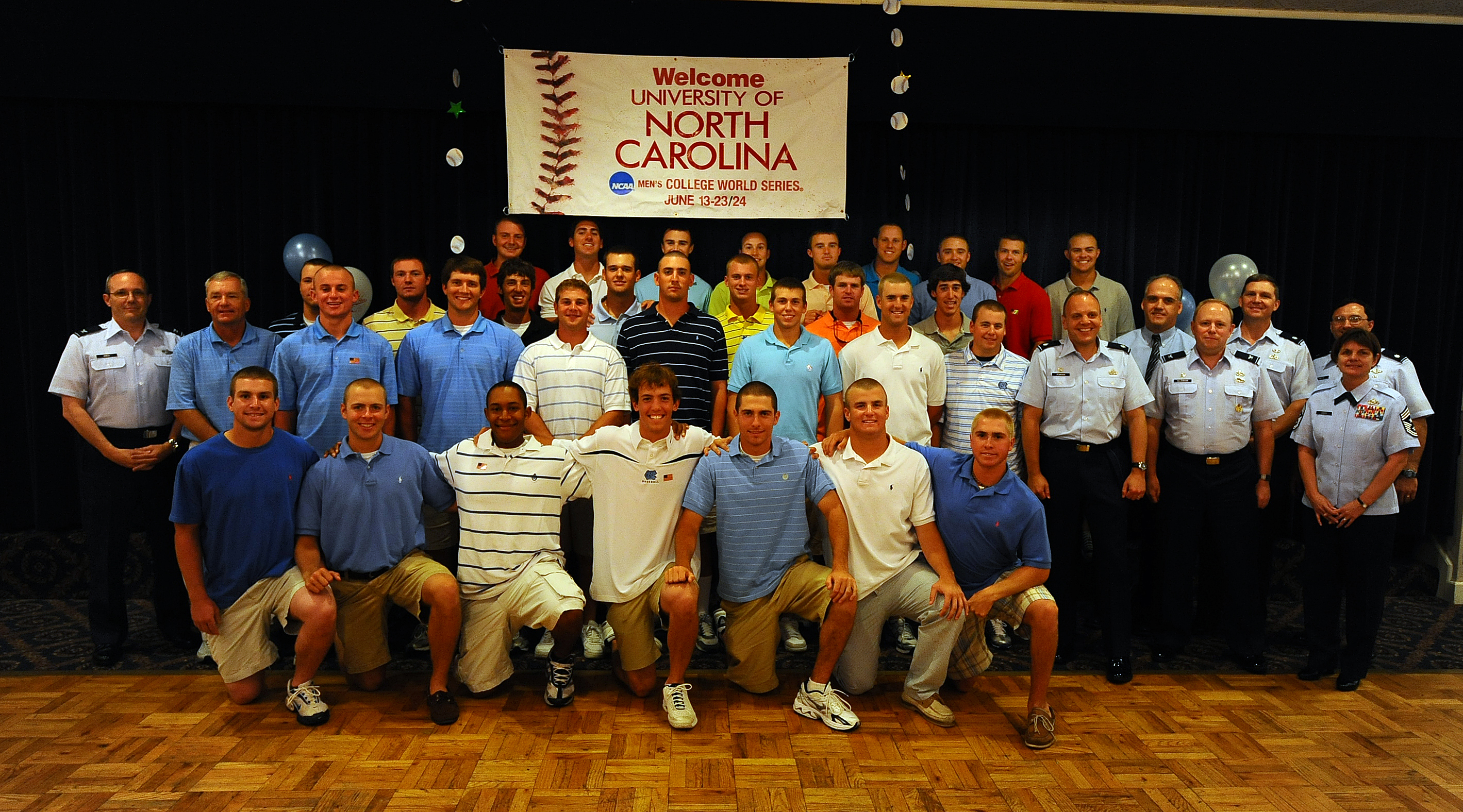
The 2009 Tar Heels baseball team in Nebraska for the College World Series

Coach	Years	Record	Win Pct.
Perrin Busbee	1891–1893	9–6	.600
William R. Robertson	1894	10–4	.714
Jesse M. Oldham	1895	6–4	.600
Benjamin E. Stanley	1896–1897	18–8–1	.630
William A. Reynolds	1898–1899	21–5–1	.796
Bob Lawson	1900, 1905–1906, 1910	47–23–2	.667
Ernest Graves	1901	11–4–2	.706
Edward M. Ashenbach	1902	7–6	.538
John Curran	1903	13–2–-2	.824
John Donnelly	1904	5–8	.385
Floyd Simmons	1907	10–9–2	.524
Otis Stocksdale	1908–1909	31–14	.689
Charles M. Clancey	1911–1912	26–14	.650
George Bowers	1913	7–11	.389
Earl T. Mack	1914	8–11	.425
Charles A. Doak	1915–1916	19–15	.559
Bunny Hearn	1917–1918, 1932–1946	214–132–2	.618
William Lourcey	1919–1920	19–16–4	.538
Bill Fetzer	1921–1925	70–37–4	.649
Vern Duncan	1926	9–16	.360
James N. Ashmore	1927–1931	72–39–3	.645
Walter Rabb	1947–1977	540–358–9	.600
Mike Roberts	1978–1998	780–428–3	.645
Mike Fox	1999–2020	840–355	.703
Scott Forbes	2021–present	154–89	.634

== Boshamer Stadium ==
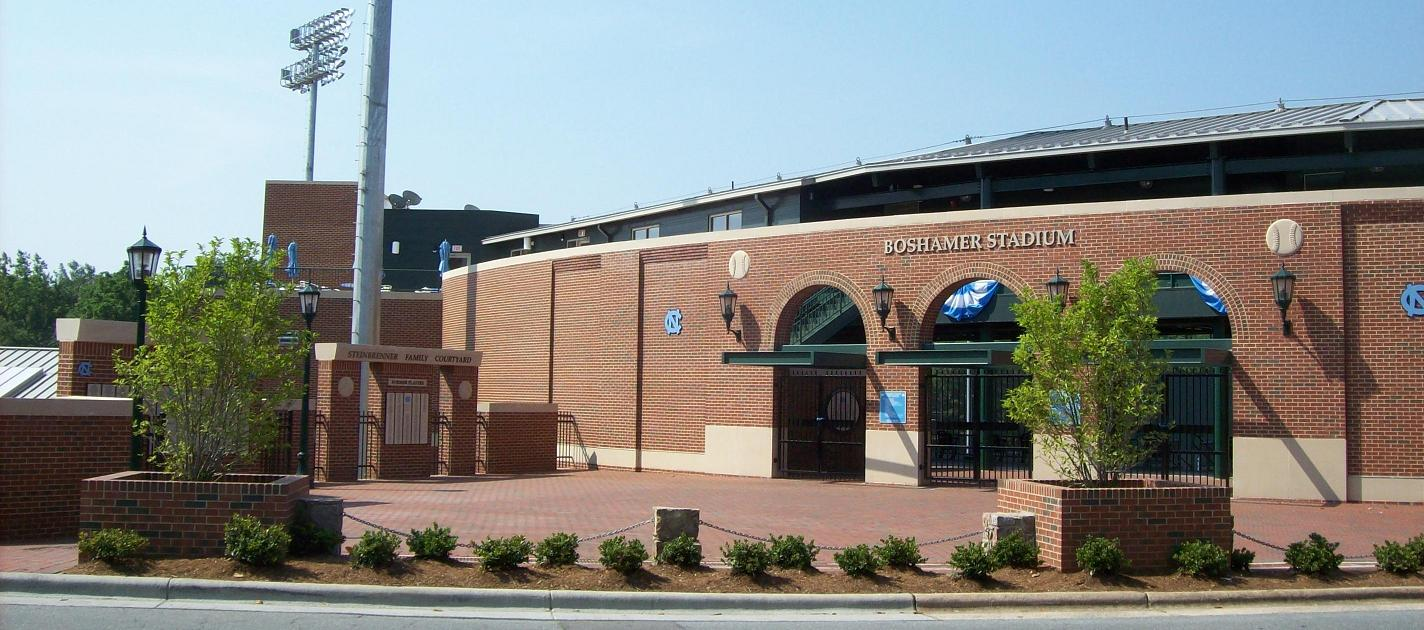
Steinbrenner Terrace at Boshamer Stadium

Boshamer Stadium, the program's home venue, originally opened in 1972 and was renovated in the late 2000s. It has a capacity of 4,100 spectators, with additional standing room. It has hosted five ACC tournaments, most recently in 1983. It is centrally located on the University campus, adjacent to Ehringhaus Residence Hall and Karen Shelton Stadium.

== Notable alumni ==
- Dustin Ackley
- Russ Adams
- Scott Bankhead
- Daniel Bard
- Tom Buskey
- Tim Federowicz
- Mike Fox
- Zac Gallen
- Tyrell Godwin
- Moonlight Graham
- Adam Greenberg
- Matt Harvey
- Garry Hill
- Chad Holbrook
- Chris Ianetta
- Levi Michael
- Andrew Miller
- Colin Moran
- Mike Morin
- R. C. Orlan
- Brian Roberts
- Kyle Seager
- Paul Shuey
- Snuffy Stirnweiss
- B. J. Surhoff
- Walt Weiss
- Brad Woodall
- Rob Wooten

=== Current MLB roster ===
Former Tar Heels on MLB opening day roster 2023 (updated March 30, 2023).

Player	Position	Number	Team
Daniel Bard	P	52	Colorado Rockies
Zac Gallen	P	23	Arizona Diamondbacks
Trevor Kelley	P	44	Tampa Bay Rays
Jacob Stallings	C	58	Miami Marlins
Trent Thornton	P	57	Toronto Blue Jays

== See also ==
- List of NCAA Division I baseball programs
