= 1980 College Baseball All-America Team =

Honorary 1980 American baseball team

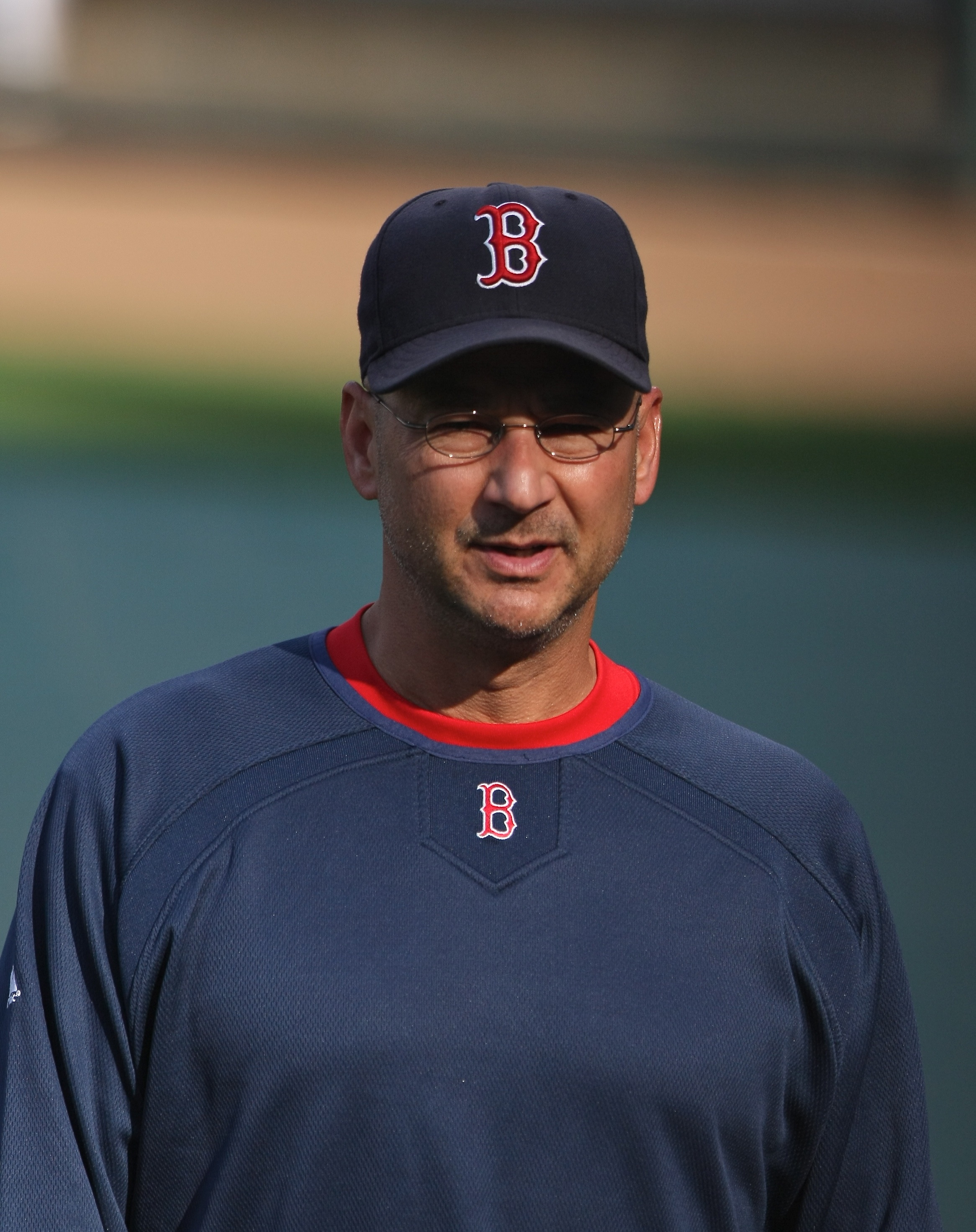
1980 All-Americans included 2× World Series-winning manager Terry Francona.

This is a list of college baseball players named first team All-Americans for the 1980 NCAA Division I baseball season. From 1964 to 1980, there were two generally recognized All-America selectors for baseball: the American Baseball Coaches Association and The Sporting News.

== Key ==
A	American Baseball Coaches Association
S	The Sporting News
	Member of the National College Baseball Hall of Fame
	Consensus All-American – selected by both organizations
	Consensus All-American – selected by one organization

== All-Americans ==
Position	Name	School	#	A	S	Other awards and honors
Pitcher	Neal Heaton	Miami (FL)	1	✓	—	
Pitcher	Ken Dayley	Portland	1	—	✓	
Pitcher	Steve Krueger	Arkansas	1	✓	—	
Pitcher	Frank Wills	Tulane	1	—	✓	
Catcher	Scotti Madison	Vanderbilt	2	✓	✓	
First baseman	Wes Clements	Arizona	1	—	✓	
First baseman	Keith Hagman	New Mexico	1	✓	—	
Second baseman	Tim Teufel	Clemson	2	✓	✓	
Shortstop	Ross Jones	Miami (FL)	1	—	✓	
Shortstop	Dave Pagel	Central Michigan	1	✓	—	
Third baseman	Jeff Smith	Delaware	1	✓	—	
Third baseman	Glenn Wilson	Sam Houston State	1	—	✓	
Outfielder	Joe Carter	Wichita State	1	—	✓	
Outfielder	Terry Francona	Arizona	2	✓	✓	Golden Spikes Award The Sporting News Player of the Year College World Series Most Outstanding Player
Outfielder	Mike Fuentes	Florida State	1	✓	—	
Outfielder	Dan Murphy	UNLV	1	✓	—	
Outfielder	Jim Weaver	Florida State	1	—	✓	
Designated hitter	Matt Gundlefinger	Kansas	1	✓	—	
Designated hitter	Randy Ward	UNLV	1	—	✓	

== See also ==
- List of college baseball awards
