= Florida State Seminoles baseball statistical leaders =

The Florida State Seminoles baseball statistical leaders are individual statistical leaders of the Florida State Seminoles baseball program in various categories, including batting average, home runs, runs batted in, runs, hits, stolen bases, ERA, and Strikeouts. Within those areas, the lists identify single-game, single-season, and career leaders. The Seminoles represent Florida State University in the NCAA's Atlantic Coast Conference.

Florida State began competing in intercollegiate baseball in 1948. These lists are updated through the end of the 2025 season.

== Batting Average ==
Career (500+ AB)
Rk	Player	AVG	Seasons
1	John-Ford Griffin	.427	1999 2000 2001
2	Bob Clem	.410	1959 1960
3	Buster Posey	.398	2006 2007 2008
4	Blane McDonald	.393	1978
5	J.D. Drew	.391	1995 1996 1997
6	Matt Diaz	.384	1998 1999
7	Marshall McDougall	.383	1999 2000
8	Gary Sprague	.379	1966
9	Bien Figueroa	.378	1985 1986
10	Mike Fuentes	.374	1978 1979 1980 1981

Season
Rk	Player	AVG	Season
1	Buster Posey	.463	2008
2	J.D. Drew	.455	1997
3	John-Ford Griffin	.450	2001
4	Tony Thomas, Jr.	.430	2007
5	Shane Robinson	.427	2005
6	Marshall McDougall	.419	1999
7	Frank Fazzini	.413	1985
8	Mike Fuentes	.408	1980
9	John-Ford Griffin	.403	2000
10	Stephen Drew	.402	2002

== Home Runs ==
Career
Rk	Player	HR	Seasons
1	Jeff Ledbetter	97	1979 1980 1981 1982
2	Frank Fazzini	79	1983 1984 1985
3	J.D. Drew	69	1995 1996 1997
4	Mike Fuentes	64	1978 1979 1980 1981
5	James Tibbs III	55	2022 2023 2024
6	Mike McGee	52	2008 2009 2010 2011
7	Ryan Barthelemy	50	1999 2000 2001 2002
8	Paul Sorrento	48	1984 1985 1986
9	Jeremy Morris	46	1994 1995 1996 1997
10	Ed Fulton	45	1985 1986 1987

Season
Rk	Player	HR	Season
1	Jeff Ledbetter	42	1982
2	Frank Fazzini	32	1985
3	J.D. Drew	31	1997
4	Frank Fazzini	29	1984
5	James Tibbs III	28	2024
	Marshall McDougall	28	1999
7	Mike Fuentes	27	1981
8	Buster Posey	26	2008
	Chris Cawthon	26	1982
10	Jeremy Morris	25	1997

Single Game
Rk	Player	HR	Season	Opponent
1	Marshall McDougall	6	1999	Maryland

== Runs Batted In ==
Career
Rk	Player	RBI	Seasons
1	Jeff Ledbetter	346	1979 1980 1981 1982
2	Jeremy Morris	273	1994 1995 1996 1997
3	Frank Fazzini	270	1983 1984 1985
4	Ryan Barthelemy	261	1999 2000 2001 2002
5	J.D. Drew	257	1995 1996 1997
6	Mike McGee	245	2008 2009 2010 2011
7	Mike Fuentes	234	1978 1979 1980 1981
8	Mike Yastrzemski	223	1980 1981 1982 1983
9	Paul Sorrento	222	1984 1985 1986
10	Buster Posey	206	2006 2007 2008

Season
Rk	Player	RBI	Season
1	Jeff Ledbetter	124	1982
2	Frank Fazzini	118	1985
3	Jeremy Morris	116	1997
4	Marshall McDougall	106	1999
5	Chris Cawthon	103	1982
6	J.D. Drew	100	1997
7	James Tibbs III	95	2024
	Jeff Ledbetter	95	1981
9	Ryan Barthelemy	94	2002
	Matt Diaz	94	1999
	J.D. Drew	94	1997

Single Game
Rk	Player	RBI	Season	Opponent
1	Marshall McDougall	16	1999	Maryland

== Runs ==
Career
Rk	Player	R	Seasons
1	Jeff Ledbetter	285	1979 1980 1981 1982
2	Luis Alicea	268	1984 1985 1986
3	Frank Fazzini	261	1983 1984 1985
4	Tyler Holt	257	2008 2009 2010
5	Brooks Badeaux	256	1995 1996 1997 1998
6	J.D. Drew	254	1995 1996 1997
7	Jose Marzan	244	1984 1985 1986 1987
	Mike Yastrzemski	244	1980 1981 1982 1983
	Mike Fuentes	244	1978 1979 1980 1981
10	Scott Zech	229	1994 1995 1996 1997

Season
Rk	Player	R	Season
1	J.D. Drew	110	1997
2	Frank Fazzini	109	1985
3	Jeff Ledbetter	105	1982
4	Marshall McDougall	104	1999
5	Bien Figueroa	102	1985
6	Luis Alicea	100	1985
7	Mark Barineau	99	1982
8	Jody Reed	97	1983
9	Shane Robinson	96	2005
10	Luis Alicea	94	1986

Single Game
Rk	Player	R	Season	Opponent
1	Mark Gilbert	6	1978	Ohio State
	Luis Alicea	6	1984	Georgia State
	Marshall McDougall	6	1999	Maryland

== Hits ==
Career
Rk	Player	H	Seasons
1	Jeff Ledbetter	335	1979 1980 1981 1982
2	Luis Alicea	331	1984 1985 1986
3	Frank Fazzini	326	1983 1984 1985
4	Ryan Barthelemy	321	1999 2000 2001 2002
5	Jack Rye	312	2005 2006 2007 2008
6	Jose Marzan	305	1984 1985 1986 1987
7	Jeremy Morris	302	1994 1995 1996 1997
8	Buster Posey	298	2006 2007 2008
9	Shane Robinson	296	2004 2005 2006
10	John-Ford Griffin	292	1999 2000 2001

Season
Rk	Player	H	Season
1	Frank Fazzini	137	1985
2	Marshall McDougall	126	1999
3	Shane Robinson	122	2005
4	John-Ford Griffin	121	2000
5	Buster Posey	119	2008
	Jeff Ledbetter	119	1982
7	Bien Figueroa	118	1985
8	Bien Figueroa	116	1986
	Luis Alicea	116	1985
10	Matt Diaz	114	1999

Single Game
Rk	Player	H	Season	Opponent
1	Stephen Cardullo	7	2009	Ohio State
	Marshall McDougall	7	1999	Maryland

== Stolen Bases ==
Career
Rk	Player	SB	Seasons
1	Shane Robinson	100	2004 2005 2006
2	Jose Marzan	98	1984 1985 1986 1987
3	Marc Ronan	95	1988 1989 1990
4	Allen Bevis	91	1989 1990 1991 1992
5	Edwin Alicea	90	1987 1988
6	Brett Groves	87	1998 1999 2000 2001
7	Scott Zech	82	1994 1995 1996 1997
	Mickey Lopez	82	1993 1994 1995
9	Mark Barineau	80	1981 1982 1983
10	Tyler Holt	79	2008 2009 2010

Season
Rk	Player	SB	Season
1	Edwin Alicea	51	1988
2	Shane Robinson	49	2005
3	Mark Gilbert	48	1978
4	Marc Ronan	43	1989
5	Eric Mangham	41	1986
6	Edwin Alicea	39	1987
	Jose Marzan	39	1987
8	Mark Barineau	36	1982
9	Tyler Holt	34	2009
	Brett Groves	34	2000
	Ronald Lewis	34	1987
	Marc Ronan	34	1990

Single Game
Rk	Player	SB	Season	Opponent
1	Chip Bifano	6	1977	Kearney State

== Earned Run Average ==
Career 200+ IP
Rk	Player	ERA	Seasons
1	Gene Ammann	1.43	1968 1969 1970
2	Wayne Vincent	1.79	1966 1967 1968
3	Marv Stringfellow	1.88	1965 1966 1967
4	Jonathan Johnson	2.18	1993 1994 1995
5	Danny O'Brien	2.25	1973 1974 1975
6	Paul Wilson	2.37	1992 1993 1994
7	Larry Jones	2.40	1974 1975 1976 1977
8	Daniel Hodges	2.56	2000 2001 2002 2003
9	Bill Fuller	2.58	1970 1971 1972 1973
10	Bryan Henry	2.60	2005 2006 2007

Season 101+ IP
Rk	Player	ERA	Season
1	Gene Ammann	0.66	1970
2	Pat Osburn	0.92	1970
3	Gene Mastin	1.27	1968
4	Danny O'Brien	1.48	1975
5	Wayne Vincent	1.51	1966
6	Wayne Vincent	1.62	1968
7	Jonathan Johnson	1.68	1993
8	Larry Jones	1.94	1975
9	Paul Wilson	2.08	1994
	Gene Ammann	2.08	1969

== Strikeouts ==
Career
Rk	Player	K	Seasons
1	Richie Lewis	520	1985 1986 1987
2	Mike Loynd	417	1983 1984 1985 1986
3	Jonathan Johnson	391	1993 1994 1995
4	Doug Little	370	1983 1984 1985 1986
5	Drew Parrish	346	2017 2018 2019
6	Matt Lynch	334	2000 2001 2002 2003
7	Jamie Arnold	327	2023 2024 2025
8	Blair Varnes	326	1999 2000 2001 2002
9	Sean Gilmartin	321	2009 2010 2011
10	Jon McDonald	320	1998 1999 2000

Season
Rk	Player	K	Season
1	Mike Loynd	223	1986
2	Richie Lewis	202	1986
3	Richie Lewis	196	1987
4	Paul Wilson	161	1994
5	Jamie Arnold	159	2024
6	Mike Ziegler	149	2000
7	Parker Messick	144	2022
	Tyler Holton	144	2017
9	Tim Davis	142	1992
10	Nick Stocks	139	1999

Single Game
Rk	Player	K	Season	Opponent
1	Tony Avitable	24	1956	Furman
