= 1980 NCAA Division I baseball season =

Baseball season

- Number of teams: 249

NCAA tournament

College World Series
- Champions: Arizona (2nd title)
- Runners-up: Hawaii (1st CWS Appearance)
- Winning coach: Jerry Kindall (2nd title)
- MOP: Terry Francona (Arizona)

Seasons
- ← 1979 1981 →

The 1980 NCAA Division I baseball season, play of college baseball in the United States organized by the National Collegiate Athletic Association (NCAA) began in the spring of 1980. The season progressed through the regular season and concluded with the 1980 College World Series. The College World Series, held for the thirty fourth time in 1980, consisted of one team from each of eight regional competitions and was held in Omaha, Nebraska at Johnny Rosenblatt Stadium as a double-elimination tournament. Arizona claimed the championship for the second time.

== Conference winners ==
This is a partial list of conference champions from the 1980 season. The NCAA sponsored regional competitions to determine the College World Series participants. Seven regionals of four teams and one of six each competed in double-elimination tournaments, with the winners advancing to Omaha. 21 teams earned automatic bids by winning their conference championship while 13 teams earned at-large selections.

Conference	Regular season winner	Conference tournament	Tournament venue • city	Tournament winner
ACC	North Carolina	1980 Atlantic Coast Conference baseball tournament	Doak Field • Raleigh, NC	Clemson
Big 8	East - Nebraska; West - Oklahoma State	1980 Big Eight Conference baseball tournament	All Sports Stadium • Oklahoma City, OK	Missouri
Big Ten	Michigan	No tournament		
Eastern 8		1980 Eastern 8 Conference baseball tournament	The Ellipse • Washington, DC	UMass
EIBL	Harvard	No tournament		
Metro		1980 Metro Conference baseball tournament	Seminole Field • Tallahassee, FL	Florida State
MAC	Central Michigan	No tournament		
Pac-10	North - Washington State; South - Arizona/California	No tournament		
SEC	East - Florida; West - Auburn	1980 Southeastern Conference baseball tournament	Perry Field • Gainesville, FL	Vanderbilt
SoCon	East Tennessee State	No tournament		
SWC	Texas	1980 Southwest Conference baseball tournament	Olsen Field • College Station, TX	Texas
TAAC	N/A	1980 Trans America Athletic Conference baseball tournament	Luther Williams Field • Macon, GA	Georgia Southern
WAC	North - BYU; South - Hawaii	1980 Western Athletic Conference Baseball Championship Series	UH Stadium • Honolulu, HI	Hawaii

== Conference standings ==
The following is an incomplete list of conference standings:

1980 Atlantic Coast Conference baseball standings
	Conf.				Overall
Team	W		L	PCT	W		L	PCT
North Carolina ‍†‍‍	11	–	1	.917	39	–	17	.696
Maryland ‍‍‍	9	–	4	.692	24	–	10	.706
No. 8 Clemson ‍‍‡‍^{y}	6	–	5	.545	38	–	21	.644
NC State ‍‍‍	7	–	6	.538	21	–	12	.636
Virginia ‍‍‍	6	–	6	.500	21	–	13	.618
Wake Forest ‍‍‍	5	–	8	.385	17	–	13	.567
Georgia Tech ‍‍‍	3	–	10	.231	8	–	19	.296
Duke ‍‍‍	2	–	9	.182	17	–	11	.607
† – Conference champion ‡ – Tournament champion y – Invited to the NCAA tournament As of June 30, 1980; Rankings from Collegiate Baseball

1980 Big Ten Conference baseball standings
	Conf.						Overall
Team	W		L		T	PCT	W		L		T	PCT
No. 6 Michigan ‍†‍‍^{y}	14	–	2	–	0	.875	36	–	18	–	1	.664
Minnesota ‍‍‍	14	–	4	–	0	.778	33	–	13	–	0	.717
Iowa ‍‍‍	11	–	5	–	0	.688	31	–	14	–	0	.689
Wisconsin ‍‍‍	10	–	8	–	0	.556	23	–	24	–	1	.490
Purdue ‍‍‍	7	–	9	–	0	.438	27	–	24	–	0	.529
Ohio State ‍‍‍	6	–	10	–	0	.375	18	–	25	–	0	.419
Indiana ‍‍‍	6	–	10	–	0	.375	17	–	25	–	0	.405
Illinois ‍‍‍	6	–	10	–	0	.375	18	–	33	–	1	.356
Northwestern ‍‍‍	5	–	11	–	0	.313	20	–	21	–	1	.488
Michigan State ‍‍‍	3	–	13	–	0	.188	15	–	35	–	0	.300
† – Conference champion y – Invited to the NCAA tournament As of June 30, 1980; Rankings from Collegiate Baseball

1980 NCAA Division I baseball independents standings
	Conf.				Overall
Team	W		L	PCT	W		L	PCT
No. 4 Miami (FL) ‍‍‍^{y}		–		–	59	–	12	.831
No. 7 Florida State ‍‍‍^{y}		–		–	51	–	12	.810
Notre Dame ‍‍‍		–		–	29	–	8	.784
Air Force ‍‍‍		–		–	27	–	9	.750
No. 10 Gonzaga ‍‍‍^{y}		–		–	39	–	15	.722
Stetson ‍‍‍		–		–	34	–	18	.654
Louisville ‍‍‍		–		–	38	–	21	.644
Detroit ‍‍‍		–		–	32	–	21	.604
Campbell ‍‍‍		–		–	18	–	18	.500
Lafayette ‍‍‍		–		–	11	–	13	.458
Northern Iowa ‍‍‍		–		–	12	–	16	.429
Hofstra ‍‍‍		–		–	7	–	28	.200
y – Invited to the NCAA tournament As of June 30, 1980; Rankings from Collegiate Baseball

1980 Pacific-10 Conference baseball standings
	Conf.				Overall
Team	W		L	PCT	W		L	PCT
Northern
Washington State ^{x}‍‍‍	11	–	3	.786	36	–	10	.783
Oregon State ‍‍‍	8	–	9	.471	33	–	16	.673
Washington ‍‍‍	6	–	9	.400	33	–	20	.623
Oregon ‍‍‍	6	–	10	.375	19	–	21	.475
Southern
No. 1 Arizona ^{x}‍‍‍^{y}	17	–	13	.567	45	–	21	.682
No. 3 California ^{x}‍‍‍^{y}	17	–	13	.567	44	–	23	.657
Arizona State ‍‍‍	15	–	15	.500	38	–	25	.603
UCLA ‍‍‍	15	–	15	.500	31	–	22	.585
Stanford ‍‍‍	13	–	17	.433	29	–	24	.547
Southern California ‍‍‍	13	–	17	.433	27	–	24	.529
x – Division champion y – Invited to the NCAA tournament As of June 30, 1980; Rankings from Collegiate Baseball

1980 Southeastern Conference baseball standings
	Conf.				Overall
Team	W		L	PCT	W		L	PCT
Eastern Division
Florida ^{x}‍‍‍	16	–	8	.667	40	–	16	.714
Vanderbilt ‍‍‡‍^{y}	13	–	9	.591	34	–	21	.618
Georgia ‍‍‍	9	–	10	.474	33	–	12	.733
Kentucky ‍‍‍	8	–	11	.421	25	–	21	.543
Tennessee ‍‍‍	6	–	14	.300	23	–	21	.523
Western Division
Auburn ^{x}‍‍‍	15	–	8	.652	27	–	24	.529
Ole Miss ‍‍‍	9	–	9	.500	24	–	22	.522
Mississippi State ‍‍‍	10	–	11	.476	31	–	19	.620
LSU ‍‍‍	8	–	9	.471	23	–	19	.548
Alabama ‍‍‍	8	–	13	.381	18	–	28	.391
x – Division champion ‡ – Tournament champion y – Invited to the NCAA tournament As of June 30, 1980; Rankings from Collegiate Baseball

1980 Southern Conference baseball standings
	Conf.				Overall
Team	W		L	PCT	W		L	PCT
No. 22 East Tennessee State ‍†‍‍^{y}	14	–	1	.933	39	–	7	.848
Marshall ‍‍‍	10	–	3	.769	17	–	11	.607
Appalachian State ‍‍‍	10	–	5	.667	17	–	19	.472
Western Carolina ‍‍‍	8	–	5	.615	22	–	15	.595
The Citadel ‍‍‍	9	–	6	.600	23	–	14	.622
Davidson ‍‍‍	7	–	8	.467	15	–	24	.385
Furman ‍‍‍	2	–	10	.167	7	–	22	.241
Chattanooga ‍‍‍	1	–	11	.083	12	–	20	.375
VMI ‍‍‍	0	–	12	.000	4	–	22	.154
y – Invited to the NCAA tournament As of June 30, 1980; Rankings from Collegiate Baseball

1980 Southwest Conference baseball standings
	Conf.				Overall
Team	W		L	PCT	W		L	PCT
No. 11 Texas ‍†‍‡‍^{y}	18	–	6	.750	53	–	13	.803
No. 28 Texas A&M ‍‍‍	17	–	6	.739	38	–	14	.731
No. 19 Arkansas ‍‍‍^{y}	15	–	8	.652	44	–	22	.667
Texas Tech ‍‍‍	14	–	10	.583	28	–	23	.549
Baylor ‍‍‍	12	–	12	.500	25	–	19	.568
Rice ‍‍‍	8	–	16	.333	14	–	29	.326
TCU ‍‍‍	7	–	14	.333	19	–	28	.404
SMU ‍‍‍	7	–	15	.318	21	–	22	.488
Houston ‍‍‍	6	–	17	.261	17	–	28	.378
† – Conference champion ‡ – Tournament champion y – Invited to the NCAA tournament As of June 30, 1980; Rankings from Collegiate Baseball

1980 Trans America Athletic Conference baseball standings
	Conf.				Overall
Team	W		L	PCT	W		L	PCT
Georgia Southern ‍‍‡‍^{y}	0	–	0	–	38	–	21	.644
Mercer ‍‍‍	0	–	0	–	31	–	18	.633
Centenary ‍‍‍	0	–	0	–	34	–	19	.642
Northeast Louisiana ‍‍‍	0	–	0	–	20	–	15	.571
Hardin–Simmons ‍‍‍	0	–	0	–	25	–	25	.500
Northwestern State ‍‍‍	0	–	0	–	23	–	23	.500
† – Conference champion ‡ – Tournament champion y – Invited to the NCAA tournament As of June 30, 1980; Rankings from Collegiate Baseball

1980 Western Athletic Conference baseball standings
	Conf.				Overall
Team	W		L	PCT	W		L	PCT
North
BYU ^{x}‍‍‍^{y}	14	–	3	.824	41	–	18	.695
Wyoming ‍‍‍	11	–	6	.647	23	–	20	.535
Utah ‍‍‍	5	–	12	.294	17	–	19	.472
Colorado State ‍‍‍	4	–	13	.235	17	–	37	.315
South
No. 2 Hawaii ^{x}‍‍‡‍^{y}	19	–	5	.792	60	–	18	.769
New Mexico ‍‍‍	16	–	8	.667	43	–	20	.683
San Diego State ‍‍‍	11	–	12	.478	40	–	26	.606
UTEP ‍‍‍	1	–	22	.043	22	–	39	.361
x – Division champion ‡ – Championship Series champion y – Invited to the NCAA tournament As of 18 November 2016; Rankings from Collegiate Baseball

== College World Series ==
The 1980 season marked the thirty fourth NCAA baseball tournament, which culminated with the eight team College World Series. The College World Series was held in Omaha, Nebraska. The eight teams played a double-elimination format, with Arizona claiming their second championship with a 5–3 win over Hawaii in the final.

Upper round 1
St. John's	6
Arizona	1
Hawaii	7
Florida State	6
Miami (FL)	13
Clemson	5
Michigan	9^{11}
California	8

Upper round 2
St. John's	2
Hawaii	7
Miami (FL)	3
Michigan	2
Lower round 1
Arizona	5
Florida State	3
Clemson	4
California	6

Upper final
Hawaii	9
Miami (FL)	3
Lower round 2
Michigan	0
Arizona	8
St. John's	5
California	8

Semifinals
Hawaii	4
Arizona	6^{11}
Miami (FL)	3
California	4

Preliminary final
Arizona	10
California	9

Final
Hawaii	3
Arizona	5
