= 1980 Arizona Wildcats baseball team =

NCAA Division I baseball season

1980 Arizona Wildcats baseball

College World Series Champions vs. Hawaii

West Regional Champions Pacific-10 Southern Regular Season Champions
- Conference: Pacific-10 Conference
- CB: No. 1
- Record: 45-21-1 (17–13 Pac-10)
- Head coach: Jerry Kindall (8th season)
- Assistant coaches: Jerry Stitt (2nd season); Jim Wing (8th season)
- Home stadium: Wildcat Field

1980 Pacific-10 Conference baseball standings
	Conf.				Overall
Team	W		L	PCT	W		L	PCT
Northern
Washington State ^{x}‍‍‍	11	–	3	.786	36	–	10	.783
Oregon State ‍‍‍	8	–	9	.471	33	–	16	.673
Washington ‍‍‍	6	–	9	.400	33	–	20	.623
Oregon ‍‍‍	6	–	10	.375	19	–	21	.475
Southern
No. 1 Arizona ^{x}‍‍‍^{y}	17	–	13	.567	45	–	21	.682
No. 3 California ^{x}‍‍‍^{y}	17	–	13	.567	44	–	23	.657
Arizona State ‍‍‍	15	–	15	.500	38	–	25	.603
UCLA ‍‍‍	15	–	15	.500	31	–	22	.585
Stanford ‍‍‍	13	–	17	.433	29	–	24	.547
Southern California ‍‍‍	13	–	17	.433	27	–	24	.529
x – Division champion y – Invited to the NCAA tournament As of June 30, 1980; Rankings from Collegiate Baseball

The 1980 Arizona Wildcats baseball team represented the University of Arizona in the 1980 NCAA Division I baseball season. The Wildcats played their home games at Wildcat Field. The team was coached by Jerry Kindall in his 8th season at Arizona. The Wildcats finished with a record of 45-21-1 and 17–13 in conference play, finishing tied for 1st in the "Six-Pac" (Pac-10 Southern). This was the Wildcats' 1st Pacific-10 Conference championship. Arizona advanced to the postseason for the 3rd straight season and was selected to host the West Regional at Wildcat Field. The Wildcats defeated Fresno State in their 1st game before defeating Gonzaga twice to advance to the College World Series for the 2nd straight season (and 12th overall). After losing their 1st game in Omaha, Nebraska to St. John's, Arizona won the next 4 against Florida State, Michigan, Hawaii and California to advance to the final game: a rematch against Hawaii. The Wildcats defeated Hawaii 5–3 to win their 2nd National Championship.

== Personnel ==
=== Roster ===
1980 Arizona Wildcats roster
Pitchers: Greg Bargar; Scott Green; Joe Kellner; Craig Lefferts; Jeff Morris; Jay Sargent; Ron Sismondo; Ed Vosberg; Mike Flinn	Infielders: Casey Candaele; Wes Clements; Clark Crist; Ron Quick; Pat Roessler; Shawn Smith	Outfielders: Terry Francona; John Moses; Gary Schulz; Dwight Taylor; Catchers: Chuck Hoyack; Don Hyman; David Landrith; Steven Miller

=== Coaches ===
1980 Arizona Wildcats baseball coaching staff
- Jerry Kindall - Head coach
- Jerry Stitt - Assistant coach
- Jim Wing - Assistant coach

== 1980 Schedule and results ==
1980 Arizona Wildcats baseball game log
Regular season
Date	Opponent	Site/Stadium	Score	Overall Record	Pac-10 Record
Feb 7	Cal State Fullerton	Wildcat Field • Tucson, AZ	W 12–3	1-0-0	
Feb 9	Cal State Fullerton	Wildcat Field • Tucson, AZ	L 1–4	2-0-0	
Feb 10	Cal State Fullerton	Wildcat Field • Tucson, AZ	W 7–1	2-1-0	
Feb 16	Pepperdine	Wildcat Field • Tucson, AZ	T 15-15	2-1-1	
Feb 18	San Diego State	Wildcat Field • Tucson, AZ	L 3–5	2-2-1	
Feb 19	San Diego State	Wildcat Field • Tucson, AZ	W 7–2	3-2-1	
Feb 20	San Diego State	Wildcat Field • Tucson, AZ	W 14–8	4-2-1	
Feb 22	La Verne	Wildcat Field • Tucson, AZ	W 20–18	5-2-1	
Feb 23	La Verne	Wildcat Field • Tucson, AZ	W 4–0	6-2-1	
Feb 23	La Verne	Wildcat Field • Tucson, AZ	W 30–8	7-2-1	
Feb 25	UC Riverside	Wildcat Field • Tucson, AZ	L 1–2	7-3-1	
Feb 26	UC Riverside	Wildcat Field • Tucson, AZ	W 13–3	8-3-1	
Feb 29	at Stanford	Sunken Diamond • Palo Alto, CA	L 6–10	8-4-1	0-1
Mar 1	at Stanford	Sunken Diamond • Palo Alto, CA	L 6–8	8-5-1	0-2
Mar 2	at Stanford	Sunken Diamond • Palo Alto, CA	W 3–2	9-5-1	1-2
Mar 6	USC	Wildcat Field • Tucson, AZ	W 4–1	10-5-1	2-2
Mar 7	USC	Wildcat Field • Tucson, AZ	L 6–9	10-6-1	2-3
Mar 8	USC	Wildcat Field • Tucson, AZ	W 8–7	11-6-1	3-3
Mar 11	Gonzaga	Wildcat Field • Tucson, AZ	W 12–6	12-6-1	
Mar 11	Gonzaga	Wildcat Field • Tucson, AZ	W 3–1	13-6-1	
Mar 13	at UCLA	Eddy D. Field Stadium • Malibu, CA	L 1–5	13-7-1	3-4
Mar 14	at UCLA	Eddy D. Field Stadium • Malibu, CA	L 2–8	13-8-1	3-5
Mar 15	at UCLA	Eddy D. Field Stadium • Malibu, CA	L 5–7	13-9-1	3-6
Mar 17	vs Point Loma	Smith Field • San Diego, CA	W 8–4	14-9-1	
Mar 18	vs Loyola Marymount	Smith Field • San Diego, CA	L 3–8	14-10-1	
Mar 18	vs Northern Arizona	Smith Field • San Diego, CA	W 9–4	15-10-1	
Mar 19	vs San Diego	Smith Field • San Diego, CA	L 0–10	15-11-1	
Mar 20	vs Portland State	Smith Field • San Diego, CA	T 2-2^{a}	15-12-1	
Mar 20	vs Colorado State	Smith Field • San Diego, CA	W 18–6	16-12-1	
Mar 22	at San Diego State	Smith Field • San Diego, CA	W 7–5	17-12-1	
Mar 22	at San Diego State	Smith Field • San Diego, CA	T 7-7^{b}	18-12-1	
Mar 24	Colorado	Wildcat Field • Tucson, AZ	W 6–2	19-12-1	
Mar 25	Colorado	Wildcat Field • Tucson, AZ	W 3–0	20-12-1	
Mar 27	California	Wildcat Field • Tucson, AZ	L 5–6	20-13-1	3-7
Mar 28	California	Wildcat Field • Tucson, AZ	W 4–3	21-13-1	4-7
Mar 29	California	Wildcat Field • Tucson, AZ	W 14–9	22-13-1	5-7
Apr 3	at Arizona State	Packard Stadium • Tempe, AZ	L 2–3	22-14-1	5-8
Apr 4	at Arizona State	Packard Stadium • Tempe, AZ	W 11–5	23-14-1	6-8
Apr 5	at Arizona State	Packard Stadium • Tempe, AZ	W 14–7	24-14-1	7-8
Apr 8	Washington State	Wildcat Field • Tucson, AZ	W 11–7	25-14-1	
Apr 10	UCLA	Wildcat Field • Tucson, AZ	W 3–2	26-14-1	8-8
Apr 11	UCLA	Wildcat Field • Tucson, AZ	W 17–1	27-14-1	9-8
Apr 12	UCLA	Wildcat Field • Tucson, AZ	L 3–4	27-15-1	9-9
Apr 14	Northern Arizona	Wildcat Field • Tucson, AZ	L 4–10	27-16-1	
Apr 14	Northern Arizona	Wildcat Field • Tucson, AZ	W 8–0	28-16-1	
Apr 17	Stanford	Wildcat Field • Tucson, AZ	W 6–4	29-16-1	10-9
Apr 18	Stanford	Wildcat Field • Tucson, AZ	W 15–6	30-16-1	11-9
Apr 19	Stanford	Wildcat Field • Tucson, AZ	W 7–5	31-16-1	12-9
Apr 22	Grand Canyon	Wildcat Field • Tucson, AZ	W 14–5	32-16-1	
Apr 24	at USC	Dedeaux Field • Los Angeles, CA	L 2–3	32-17-1	12-10
Apr 25	at USC	Dedeaux Field • Los Angeles, CA	W 9–7	33-17-1	13-10
Apr 26	at USC	Dedeaux Field • Los Angeles, CA	W 9–3	34-17-1	14-10
May 1	at California	Evans Diamond • Berkeley, CA	W 4–3	35-17-1	15-10
May 2	at California	Evans Diamond • Berkeley, CA	W 9–8	36-17-1	16-10
May 3	at California	Evans Diamond • Berkeley, CA	L 0–2	36-18-1	16-11
May 8	Arizona State	Wildcat Field • Tucson, AZ	L 8–14	36-19-1	16-12
May 9	Arizona State	Wildcat Field • Tucson, AZ	L 6–8	36-20-1	16-13
May 10	Arizona State	Wildcat Field • Tucson, AZ	W 22–4	37-20-1	17-13
NCAA West Regional
May 23	Fresno State	Wildcat Field • Tucson, AZ	W 5–4	38-20-1	
May 24	Gonzaga	Wildcat Field • Tucson, AZ	W 13–9	39-20-1	
May 25	Gonzaga	Wildcat Field • Tucson, AZ	W 8–5	40-20-1	
College World Series
May 30	vs St. John's	Johnny Rosenblatt Stadium • Omaha, NE	L 1–6	40-21-1	
May 31	vs Florida State	Johnny Rosenblatt Stadium • Omaha, NE	W 5–3	41-21-1	
Jun 2	vs Michigan	Johnny Rosenblatt Stadium • Omaha, NE	W 8–0	42-21-1	
Jun 4	vs Hawaii	Johnny Rosenblatt Stadium • Omaha, NE	W 6–4	43-21-1	
Jun 5	vs California	Johnny Rosenblatt Stadium • Omaha, NE	W 11–10	44-21-1	
Jun 6	vs Hawaii	Johnny Rosenblatt Stadium • Omaha, NE	W 5–3	45-21-1	

=== West Regional ===
West Regional Teams
Arizona Wildcats	Fresno State Bulldogs	Gonzaga Bulldogs	Cal State Fullerton Titans

== College World Series ==
1980 College World Series Teams
Arizona Wildcats	California Golden Bears	Clemson Tigers	Florida State Seminoles	Hawaii Rainbow Warriors	Miami Hurricanes	Michigan Wolverines	St. John's Redmen

Upper round 1
St. John's	6
Arizona	1
Hawaii	7
Florida State	6
Miami (FL)	13
Clemson	5
Michigan	9^{11}
California	8

Upper round 2
St. John's	2
Hawaii	7
Miami (FL)	3
Michigan	2
Lower round 1
Arizona	5
Florida State	3
Clemson	4
California	6

Upper final
Hawaii	9
Miami (FL)	3
Lower round 2
Michigan	0
Arizona	8
St. John's	5
California	8

Semifinals
Hawaii	4
Arizona	6^{11}
Miami (FL)	3
California	4

Preliminary final
Arizona	10
California	9

Final
Hawaii	3
Arizona	5

== Awards and honors ==
Craig Barger

- College World Series All-Tournament Team

Wes Clements

- First Team All-American
- First Team All-Pac-10 South
- College World Series All-Tournament Team

Terry Francona

- Golden Spikes Award
- The Sporting News Player of the Year
- First Team All-American
- Pac-10 South Player of the Year
- College World Series Most Outstanding Player

Craig Lefferts

- College World Series All-Tournament Team

John Moses

- First Team All-Pac-10 South

Dwight Taylor

- First Team All-Pac-10 South

== 1980 MLB draft ==
Player	Position	Round	Overall	MLB team
Terry Francona	OF	1	22	Montreal Expos
Greg Bargar	RHP	3	73	Montreal Expos
Wes Clements	OF	6	146	Houston Astros
Craig Lefferts	LHP	9	218	Chicago Cubs
Clark Crist	INF	14	343	Seattle Mariners
Jeff Morris	LHP	15	380	Houston Astros
John Moses	OF	16	395	Seattle Mariners

== Notes ==
- ^a As part of the Sun Lite Classic, Arizona lost 7–14 as a result of a tiebreaker.
- ^b As part of the Sun Lite Classic, Arizona won 28–16 as a result of a tiebreaker.
