= 1980 ACC tournament =

1980 ACC tournament may refer to:

- 1980 ACC men's basketball tournament
- 1980 ACC women's basketball tournament
- 1980 Atlantic Coast Conference baseball tournament
