= Joe Russo (baseball) =

American baseball player and coach (1944–2019)

Biographical details
- Born: July 5, 1944
- Died: May 26, 2019 (aged 74)

Playing career
- 1964–1966: St. John's
- Position: Shortstop

Coaching career (HC unless noted)
- 1974–1995: St. John's

Head coaching record
- Overall: 611–310–4
- Tournaments: NCAA: 28–27

Accomplishments and honors

Championships
- 3× Big East Champion (1987, 1990, 1991); 4× Big East Tournament champion (1985, 1986, 1988, 1993)

Awards
- 2× Big East Coach of the Year (1990, 1991)

Joseph James Russo (July 5, 1944 – May 26, 2019) was an American baseball coach and shortstop.

== Career ==
Russo played college baseball for St. John's, and as a senior captain shortstop he led the Redmen to the 1966 College World Series, where he was named to the All-Tournament team. In 1963 and 1964, he played collegiate summer baseball with the Cotuit Kettleers of the Cape Cod Baseball League (CCBL).

Russo served as the head coach at St. John's from 1974 to 1995, and in 1975 he returned to the CCBL to coach the Chatham A's. Russo led St. John's to the 1978 College World Series and 1980 College World Series.

== Head coaching record ==
=== College baseball ===
Record table
Season	Team	Overall	Conference	Standing	Postseason
St. John's Redmen (Independent) (1974–1984)
1974	St. John's	26–6			NCAA District playoffs
1975	St. John's	28–11			Northeast Regional
1976	St. John's	33–7–1			Northeast Regional
1977	St. John's	32–10			Northeast Regional
1978	St. John's	40–18			College World Series
1979	St. John's	26–11			Northeast Regional
1980	St. John's	30–11			College World Series
1981	St. John's	34–4			Northeast Regional
1982	St. John's	20–15			
1983	St. John's	18–16			
1984	St. John's	26–7			
St. John's Redmen / Red Storm (Big East Conference) (1985–1995)
1984	St. John's	32–21	10–7	2nd (North)	East Regional
1986	St. John's	35–15–1	11–7	T-1st (North)	Northeast Regional
1987	St. John's	24–21	12–6	1st (North)	
1988	St. John's	29–21–1	9–9	2nd (North)	Northeast Regional
1989	St. John's	19–19	6–12	4th (North)	
1990	St. John's	29–18	15–6	2nd	
1991	St. John's	34–14–1	18–2	1st	Atlantic Regional
1992	St. John's	30–13	14–5	1st	
1993	St. John's	28–20	11–10	T-4th	West Regional
1994	St. John's	20–16	10–8	5th	
1995	St. John's	18–16	12–9	T-4th	
St. John's:		611–310–4	128–81		
Total:		367–133–2			
National champion Postseason invitational champion Conference regular season champion Conference regular season and conference tournament champion Division regular season champion Division regular season and conference tournament champion Conference tournament champion
