= 1980 St. John's Redmen baseball team =

American college baseball season

1980 St. John's Redmen baseball

Northeast Regional champions

College World Series, T-5th
- Conference: Independent
- Record: 30–11
- Head coach: Joe Russo (7th season)
- Assistant coach: Ed Mathes
- Pitching coach: Howie Gershberg
- Captains: Steve Bingham; Greg LaCasse; Doug Latrenta
- Home stadium: Redman Field

The 1980 St. John's Redmen baseball team represented the St. John's University in the 1980 NCAA Division I baseball season. The Redmen played their home games at Redman Field. The team was coached by Joe Russo in his 7th year at St. John's.

The Redmen won the Northeast Regional to advance to the College World Series, where they went 1-2 and were eliminated by the California Golden Bears.

== Roster ==
1980 St. John's Redmen baseball team
Players
Coaches

#	Pos.	Name	B/T	Height	Weight	Year	Home town
14	LHP	Patrick Ambrose	R/L	5 ft 10 in (1.78 m)	170 lb (77 kg)	Jr	Staten Island, NY
20	RHP	Steve Bingham	R/R	6 ft 1 in (1.85 m)	190 lb (86 kg)	Sr	Wantagh, NY
		Anthony Bonomo	/	—	—	Sr	Brooklyn, NY
21	C	Sebby Borriello	R/R	6 ft 1 in (1.85 m)	195 lb (88 kg)	Jr	Brooklyn
	OF	Frank Caporaso	R/R	—	—	Sr
28	C	Rich Connors	R/R	6 ft 3 in (1.91 m)	190 lb (86 kg)	Fr	Far Rockaway, NY
15	OF	Bob deGruchy	R/R	6 ft 0 in (1.83 m)	180 lb (82 kg)	So	N. Massapequa, NY
45	LHP	John Franco	L/L	5 ft 9 in (1.75 m)	160 lb (73 kg)	So	Brooklyn, NY
32	C	Don Giordano	R/R	6 ft 1 in (1.85 m)	190 lb (86 kg)	Fr	Staten Island, NY
27	RHP	Ronald Kiene	S/R	6 ft 3 in (1.91 m)	175 lb (79 kg)	Jr	Brooklyn, NY
17	INF	Karl Komyathy	R/R	6 ft 3 in (1.91 m)	195 lb (88 kg)	Jr	Hauppauge, NY
26	INF	Bob Kovaslsky	R/R	6 ft 0 in (1.83 m)	195 lb (88 kg)	Jr	Mineola, NY
23	RHP	Greg LaCasse	R/R	6 ft 3 in (1.91 m)	190 lb (86 kg)	Sr	W. Hempstead, NY
4	OF	Doug Latrenta	L/L	5 ft 10 in (1.78 m)	175 lb (79 kg)	Sr	Smithtown, NY
24	INF	Tom Marasa	R/R	6 ft 1 in (1.85 m)	170 lb (77 kg)	Sr	Flushing, NY
7	OF	Paul Maruffi	R/R	5 ft 9 in (1.75 m)	170 lb (77 kg)	Jr	Brooklyn, NY
	INF	Kevin McCabe	R/R	—	—	Sr
22	RHP	Vincent Merolla	R/R	6 ft 2 in (1.88 m)	190 lb (86 kg)	Sr	Brooklyn, NY
6	INF	Brian Miller	R/R	6 ft 1 in (1.85 m)	170 lb (77 kg)	Fr	Bronx, NY
31	C	Cliff Morello	R/R	5 ft 10 in (1.78 m)	190 lb (86 kg)	Sr	Plainview, NY
34	RHP	Chris Rich	R/R	6 ft 8 in (2.03 m)	190 lb (86 kg)	Jr	Levittown, NY
1	INF	Steve Scafa	S/R	5 ft 9 in (1.75 m)	165 lb (75 kg)	Jr	Brooklyn, NY
33	OF	John Simeti	L/R	5 ft 11 in (1.8 m)	190 lb (86 kg)	Sr	E. Rockaway, NY
29	LHP	Frank Viola	L/L	6 ft 4 in (1.93 m)	190 lb (86 kg)	So	East Meadow, NY
8	OF	Carl Wenz	R/R	6 ft 1 in (1.85 m)	175 lb (79 kg)	Fr	Glen Head, NY
44	LHP	Tom White	L/L	5 ft 10 in (1.78 m)	165 lb (75 kg)	Jr	Bellmore, NY

Head coach

Joe Russo

Assistant coach(es)

Ed Mathes

Pitching coach(es)

Howie Gershberg

Legend

- (C) Team captain
- (S) Suspended
- (I) Ineligible
- Injured
- Current redshirt

== Schedule ==
1980 St. John's Redmen baseball game log
Regular season
March (1–1)

#	Date	Opponent	Site/stadium	Score	Overall record
1	March 23	at Connecticut	J. O. Christian Field • Storrs, Connecticut	0–4	0–1
2	March 25	at Hofstra	University Field • Hempstead, New York	9–0	1–1

April (17–6)

#	Date	Opponent	Site/stadium	Score	Overall record
3	April 2	at Fordham	Jack Coffey Field • New York, New York	15–3	2–1
4	April 3	at Rutgers	Bainton Field • Piscataway, New Jersey	8–2	3–1
5	April 8	at William & Mary	Unknown • Williamsburg, Virginia	4–2	4–1
6	April 9	at Old Dominion	Unknown • Norfolk, Virginia	3–2	5–1
7	April 10	at Old Dominion	Unknown • Norfolk, Virginia	3–4	5–2
8	April 11	at Old Dominion	Unknown • Norfolk, Virginia	6–7	5–3
9	April 11	at Old Dominion	Unknown • Norfolk, Virginia	14–7	6–3
10	April 12	at Richmond	Malcolm U. Pitt Field • Richmond, Virginia	12–11	7–3
11	April 12	at Richmond	Malcolm U. Pitt Field • Richmond	1–2	7–4
12	April 13	at VCU	Unknown • Richmond, Virginia	1–7	7–5
13	April 13	at VCU	Unknown • Richmond, Virginia	16–4	8–5
14	April 14	at St. Francis	Unknown • New York, New York	4–3	9–5
15	April 16	Army	Redman Field • New York, New York	25–6	10–5
16	April 18	at Queens	Unknown • New York, New York	9–1	11–5
17	April 19	at Fairfield	Alumni Baseball Diamond • Fairfield, Connecticut	5–1	12–5
18	April 20	at Temple	Erny Field • Philadelphia, Pennsylvania	7–2	13–5
19	April 21	New Haven	Redman Field • New York, New York	1–2	13–6
20	April 22	Bridgeport	Redman Field • New York, New York	14–0	14–6
21	April 23	Iona	Redman Field • New York, New York	13–3	15–6
22	April 24	Ride	Redman Field • New York, New York	9–5	16–6
23	April 25	at Penn State	Beaver Field • University Park, Pennsylvania	5–1	17–6
24	April 26	at Penn State	Beaver Field • University Park, Pennsylvania	4–6	17–7
25	April 30	at Adelphi	Redman Field • New York, New York	10–2	18–7

May (4–1)

#	Date	Opponent	Site/stadium	Score	Overall record
26	May 5	St. Francis	Redman Field • New York, New York	9–1	19–7
27	May 6	Delaware	Redman Field • New York, New York	5–2	20–7
28	May 10	at Delaware	Bob Hannah Stadium • Newark, Delaware	3–2	21–7
29	May 11	at Princeton	Bill Clarke Field • Princeton, New Jersey	7–3	22–7
30	May 11	at Princeton	Bill Clarke Field • Princeton, New Jersey	4–5	22–8

Postseason
ECAC Tournament (4–1)

#	Date	Opponent	Site/stadium	Score	Overall record
31	May 16	vs LIU Brooklyn	Unknown • Unknown	6–5	23–8
32	May 17	vs Buffalo	Unknown • Unknown	0–4	23–9
33	May 17	vs Seton Hall	Unknown • Unknown	11–8	24–9
34	May 18	vs Buffalo	Unknown • Unknown	14–1	25–9
35	May 18	vs Buffalo	Unknown • Unknown	9–8	26–9

Northeast Regional (3–0)

#	Date	Opponent	Site/stadium	Score	Overall record
36	May 22	vs Maine	Unknown • Orono, Maine	6–4	27–9
37	May 23	vs Harvard	Unknown • Orono, Maine	9–5	28–9
38	May 25	vs Harvard	Unknown • Orono, Maine	6–4	29–9

College World Series (1–2)

#	Date	Opponent	Site/stadium	Score	Overall record
39	May 30	vs Arizona	Johnny Rosenblatt Stadium • Omaha, Nebraska	6–1	30–9
40	June 1	vs Hawaii	Johnny Rosenblatt Stadium • Omaha, Nebraska	2–7	30–10
41	June 2	vs California	Johnny Rosenblatt Stadium • Omaha, Nebraska	5–8	30–11

== Awards and honors ==
Paul Maruffi

- All Tournament Team
