= 1980 Southwest Conference baseball tournament =

- Teams: 4
- Format: Double-elimination tournament
- Finals site: Olsen Field; College Station, TX
- Champions: Texas (2nd title)
- Winning coach: Cliff Gustafson (2nd title)

1980 Southwest Conference baseball standings
	Conf.				Overall
Team	W		L	PCT	W		L	PCT
No. 11 Texas ‍†‍‡‍^{y}	18	–	6	.750	53	–	13	.803
No. 28 Texas A&M ‍‍‍	17	–	6	.739	38	–	14	.731
No. 19 Arkansas ‍‍‍^{y}	15	–	8	.652	44	–	22	.667
Texas Tech ‍‍‍	14	–	10	.583	28	–	23	.549
Baylor ‍‍‍	12	–	12	.500	25	–	19	.568
Rice ‍‍‍	8	–	16	.333	14	–	29	.326
TCU ‍‍‍	7	–	14	.333	19	–	28	.404
SMU ‍‍‍	7	–	15	.318	21	–	22	.488
Houston ‍‍‍	6	–	17	.261	17	–	28	.378
† – Conference champion ‡ – Tournament champion y – Invited to the NCAA tournament As of June 30, 1980; Rankings from Collegiate Baseball

The 1980 Southwest Conference baseball tournament was the league's annual postseason tournament used to determine the Southwest Conference's (SWC) automatic bid to the 1980 NCAA Division I baseball tournament. The tournament was held from May 17 through 20 at Olsen Field on the campus of Texas A&M University in College Station, Texas.

The number 1 seed Texas Longhorns went 3–1 to win the team's second SWC tournament under head coach Cliff Gustafson.

== Format and seeding ==
The tournament featured the top four finishers of the SWC's 9 teams in a double-elimination tournament.

Place	Team	Conference				Overall			Seed
Place	Team	W	L	%	GB	W	L	%	Seed
1	Texas	18	6	.750	-	53	13	.803	1
2	Texas A&M	17	6	.739	0.5	38	14	.731	2
3	Arkansas	15	8	.652	2.5	44	22	.667	3
4	Texas Tech	14	10	.583	4	28	23	.549	4
5	Baylor	12	12	.500	6	25	19	.568	-
6	Rice	8	16	.333	10	14	29	.326	-
7	TCU	7	14	.333	9.5	19	28	.404	-
8	SMU	7	15	.318	10	21	22	.488	-
9	Houston	6	17	.261	11.5	17	28	.378	-

== Tournament ==
Upper round 1
1	Texas	9
4	Texas Tech	2
2	Texas A&M	10
3	Arkansas	19
Lower round 1
4	Texas Tech	8
2	Texas A&M	5

Upper final
1	Texas	6
3	Arkansas	4
Lower final
3	Arkansas	6
4	Texas Tech	5

Final
1	Texas	7	9
3	Arkansas	8	4
