= John Moses (baseball) =

American baseball player (born 1957)

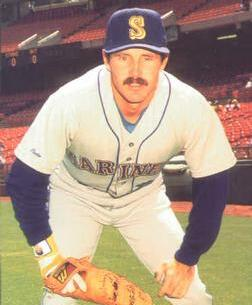
- Moses with the Seattle Mariners c. 1987
- Outfielder
- Born: August 9, 1957 (age 68); Los Angeles, California, U.S.
- Batted: Switch Threw: Left

MLB debut
- August 23, 1982, for the Seattle Mariners

Last MLB appearance
- October 4, 1992, for the Seattle Mariners

MLB statistics
- Batting average: .254
- Home runs: 11
- Runs batted in: 145
- Stats at Baseball Reference

Teams
- As player: Seattle Mariners (1982–1987); Minnesota Twins (1988–1990); Detroit Tigers (1991); Seattle Mariners (1992); As coach: Seattle Mariners (2000–2003); Cincinnati Reds (2005–2006)

John William Moses (born August 9, 1957) is an American former professional baseball player, coach, and manager. He played as an outfielder in Major League Baseball (MLB) from 1982 to 1992. After his retirement as a player, he was an MLB coach and subsequently a minor league manager. As a player, he was listed at 5 feet 10 inches (1.78 m) and 165 pounds (75 kg); he threw left-handed and was a switch hitter.

== Biography ==
Born in Los Angeles, Moses attended Western High School in Anaheim, California. He first played college baseball at Golden West College in Huntington Beach, California. As a college senior, Moses was co-captain of the 1980 Arizona Wildcats baseball team that won that season's College World Series. The team included future major league player and manager Terry Francona. Moses was selected by the Seattle Mariners in the 16th round of the 1980 MLB draft and signed with the organization in late June 1980.

Moses first played professionally during 1980, with the Bellingham Mariners, a Seattle farm team. He advanced to Double-A in 1982, also making his major league debut that season with the Mariners. He played with Seattle through 1987, then spent three seasons with the Minnesota Twins, one season with the Detroit Tigers, and then spent his final MLB season back with Seattle. In 11 MLB seasons, he had a .254 batting average with 11 home runs and 145 RBIs in 769 games. Primarily an outfielder (636 games), he appeared in 36 games as a designated hitter, 31 games as a first baseman, and three games as a pitcher. He last played in Minor League Baseball in 1992, with the Calgary Cannons of the Pacific Coast League.

After his playing career, Moses spent parts of seven seasons as a major league coach. He was the Mariners' first base coach from 2000 to 2003, then was a coach with the Cincinnati Reds in 2005 and 2006. He was a batting practice pitcher for the Mariners in 2007 and served as their interim first base coach for several days in July.

In 2008, Moses was hired by the Los Angeles Dodgers as the hitting coach for the Triple-A Las Vegas 51s. He remained with the Dodgers organization for 2009, as the hitting coach for their new Triple-A team, the Albuquerque Isotopes, a position he held through the 2010 season.

In 2016, Moses was the manager of the Atlanta Braves' Triple-A affiliate, the Gwinnett Braves of the International League, after Brian Snitker was promoted to serve as Atlanta's interim manager following the release of Fredi Gonzalez. Moses was replaced by Damon Berryhill as manager on December 12, 2016. Moses served as the hitting coach for Gwinnett through the 2018 season.
