= 1980 Trans America Athletic Conference baseball tournament =

American college baseball tournament

- Teams: 5
- Format: Double-elimination
- Finals site: Luther Williams Field; Macon, GA
- Champions: Georgia Southern (1st title)
- Winning coach: Jack Stallings (1st title)

1980 Trans America Athletic Conference baseball standings
| | Conf. | | | | Overall |
| Team | W | | L | PCT | W | | L | PCT |
|---|---|---|---|---|---|---|---|---|
| Georgia Southern ‍‍‡‍^{y} | 0 | – | 0 | – | 38 | – | 21 | .644 |
| Mercer ‍‍‍ | 0 | – | 0 | – | 31 | – | 18 | .633 |
| Centenary ‍‍‍ | 0 | – | 0 | – | 34 | – | 19 | .642 |
| Northeast Louisiana ‍‍‍ | 0 | – | 0 | – | 20 | – | 15 | .571 |
| Hardin–Simmons ‍‍‍ | 0 | – | 0 | – | 25 | – | 25 | .500 |
| Northwestern State ‍‍‍ | 0 | – | 0 | – | 23 | – | 23 | .500 |
† – Conference champion ‡ – Tournament champion y – Invited to the NCAA tournament As of June 30, 1980; Rankings from Collegiate Baseball

The 1980 Trans America Athletic Conference baseball tournament was held at Luther Williams Field on the campus of Mercer University in Macon, Georgia, from May 1 through 4. This was the second tournament championship held by the Trans America Athletic Conference, in its second year of existence. Georgia Southern won their first tournament championship. The Eagles earned a bid to the 1980 NCAA Division I baseball tournament, the first for the league.

== Format ==
The league again used a blind draw to determine matchups, and conference teams again played few games against each other prior to the tournament. The teams played a six team, double elimination tournament.

== Results ==
First round
1 | Northeast Louisiana | 12*
6 | Northwestern State | 9*
2 | Centenary | 4
5 | Georgia Southern | 3
3 | Mercer | 8
4 | Hardin–Simmons | 3

Second round
Northeast Louisiana | 6
Georgia Southern | 8
Northwestern State | 8
Hardin–Simmons | 2
Centenary | 3
Mercer | 12
Northeast Louisiana | 14
Centenary | 7

Third round
Georgia Southern | 11
Northwestern State | 4
Mercer | 7
Northeast Louisiana | 0

Final
Georgia Southern | 5 | 15
Mercer | 4 | 1

* - Indicates game required 12 innings.

== All-Tournament Team ==
The following players were named to the All-Tournament Team. No MVP was named until 1985.

| POS | Player | School |
|---|---|---|
| P | Scott Barnhouse | Mercer |
| P | Carlos Colon | Georgia Southern |
| P | Ken Marks | Centenary |
| C | Marty Pevey | Georgia Southern |
| C | Frank Scelfo | Northeast Louisiana |
| 2B | Doug Guelde | Northeast Louisiana |
| SS | Bob Laurie | Georgia Southern |
| 3B | Derrell Baker | Georgia Southern |
| OF | David Klick | Northeast Louisiana |
| OF | Frank Millerd | Mercer |
| OF | Tim Smith | Mercer |
