= 1980 Southeastern Conference baseball tournament =

- Teams: 4
- Format: Four-team double elimination tournament
- Finals site: Perry Field; Gainesville, Florida
- Champions: Vanderbilt (1st title)
- Winning coach: Roy Mewbourne (1st title)
- MVP: Dave Nenad (Vanderbilt)

1980 Southeastern Conference baseball standings
	Conf.				Overall
Team	W		L	PCT	W		L	PCT
Eastern Division
Florida ^{x}‍‍‍	16	–	8	.667	40	–	16	.714
Vanderbilt ‍‍‡‍^{y}	13	–	9	.591	34	–	21	.618
Georgia ‍‍‍	9	–	10	.474	33	–	12	.733
Kentucky ‍‍‍	8	–	11	.421	25	–	21	.543
Tennessee ‍‍‍	6	–	14	.300	23	–	21	.523
Western Division
Auburn ^{x}‍‍‍	15	–	8	.652	27	–	24	.529
Ole Miss ‍‍‍	9	–	9	.500	24	–	22	.522
Mississippi State ‍‍‍	10	–	11	.476	31	–	19	.620
LSU ‍‍‍	8	–	9	.471	23	–	19	.548
Alabama ‍‍‍	8	–	13	.381	18	–	28	.391
x – Division champion ‡ – Tournament champion y – Invited to the NCAA tournament As of June 30, 1980; Rankings from Collegiate Baseball

The 1980 Southeastern Conference baseball tournament was held at Perry Field in Gainesville, Florida, from May 9 through 11. Vanderbilt won the tournament and earned the Southeastern Conference's automatic bid to the 1980 NCAA tournament.

== Regular season results ==
Team	W	L	Pct	GB	Seed
Eastern Division
Florida	16	8	.667	—	1
Vanderbilt	13	9	.591	2	3
Georgia	9	10	.474	4.5	—
Kentucky	8	11	.421	5.5	—
Tennessee	6	14	.300	8	—

Team	W	L	Pct	GB	Seed
Western Division
Auburn	15	8	.652	—	2
Ole Miss	9	9	.500	3.5	4
Mississippi State	10	11	.476	4	—
LSU	8	9	.471	4	—
Alabama	8	13	.381	6	—

== Tournament ==
First round
2	Auburn	3
3	Vanderbilt	2
4	Ole Miss	3
1	Florida	2
Lower round 1
3	Vanderbilt	11
1	Florida	7

Semi-finals
2	Auburn	7
4	Ole Miss	4
Lower final
3	Vanderbilt	21
4	Ole Miss	0

Finals
2	Auburn	3	0
3	Vanderbilt	16	13

== All-Tournament Team ==
Position	Player	School
1B	Mike Pike	Vanderbilt
2B	Allen Mock	Auburn
SS	Larry Simcox	Ole Miss
C	Scott Madison	Vanderbilt
OF	Johnny Tutt	Auburn
OF	Jerry Williams	Vanderbilt
OF	Pat Pomeranz	Ole Miss
OF	Darrell Wilkes	Auburn
DH	Dave Nenad	Vanderbilt
UT	John Metasavage	Auburn
P	Jeff Calhoun	Ole Miss
P	Dan Jahnke	Vanderbilt
MVP	Dave Nenad	Vanderbilt

== See also ==
- College World Series
- NCAA Division I Baseball Championship
- Southeastern Conference baseball tournament
