= Les Murakami =

American baseball coach

Biographical details
- Born: June 1, 1936 (age 90); Honolulu, Hawaii, U.S.

Playing career
- 1955–1958: Santa Clara

Coaching career (HC unless noted)
- 1971–2000: Hawaii

Head coaching record
- Overall: 1079–648–4

Les Murakami (born June 1, 1936) is an American former college baseball coach who served as the head baseball coach for the Hawaii Rainbow Warriors baseball team. He played college baseball at Santa Clara and during his coaching years for Hawaii, he won 1,079 games. The Les Murakami Stadium, home ballpark of the Rainbow Warriors, was named in his honor in 2002.

== Awards ==
- Hawaii Sportsman of the Year (1977, 1980)
- Lefty Gomez Award (1981)
- District Coach of the Year (1986)
- WAC Coach of the Year (1987, 1991)
- American Baseball Coaches Association Hall of Famer
- National College Baseball Hall of Fame (2025)

== Head coaching record ==
The following is a record of Murakami's record as a head coach.

Record table
Season	Team	Overall	Conference	Standing	Postseason
Hawaii (Independent) (1971–1979)
1971	Hawaii	0–4			
1972	Hawaii	1–3			
1973	Hawaii	1–7			
1974	Hawaii	6–11			
1975	Hawaii	25–13			
1976	Hawaii	29–12			
1977	Hawaii	43–13			NCAA Regionals
1978	Hawaii	38–14–1			
1979	Hawaii	69–15			NCAA Regionals
Hawaii:		212–92–1			
Hawaii (Western Athletic Conference) (1980–2000)
1980	Hawaii	60–18	19–5	T–1st	College World Series
1981	Hawaii	50–16	10–5	2nd	
1982	Hawaii	59–17	17–7	1st	NCAA Regional
1983	Hawaii	47–20	17–7	2nd	
1984	Hawaii	48–22–1	8–6	1st	NCAA Regional
1985	Hawaii	56–31	15–9	2nd	
1986	Hawaii	43–24	15–9	2nd	NCAA Regional
1987	Hawaii	45–19	21–2	1st	NCAA Regional
1988	Hawaii	40–21–1	21–6–1	T–2nd	
1989	Hawaii	40–27	18–10	T–2nd	NCAA Regional
1990	Hawaii	37–24–1	17–10–1	4th	
1991	Hawaii	51–18	22–5	1st	NCAA Regional
1992	Hawaii	49–14	20–6	1st	NCAA Regional
1993	Hawaii	34–25	11–13	4th	NCAA Regional
1994	Hawaii	28–28	8–16	5th	
1995	Hawaii	30–24	12–17	6th	
1996	Hawaii	29–26	12–18	5th	
1997	Hawaii	22–34	14–16	4th	
1998	Hawaii	34–22	12–18	4th	
1999	Hawaii	37–20	15–14	5th	
2000	Hawaii	28–28	15–15	4th	
Hawaii:		867–556–3	319–214–2		
Total:		1079–648–4			
National champion Postseason invitational champion Conference regular season champion Conference regular season and conference tournament champion Division regular season champion Division regular season and conference tournament champion Conference tournament champion
