= Robbie Allen (baseball) =

American baseball coach (born 1959)

Robert E. Allen (born January 1, 1959) is an American sports figure who serves as the head baseball coach at Brunswick Community College. He previously played minor league baseball and scouted.

Prior to playing professionally, he attended Tabor City High School and then Clemson University. He played in the 1980 College World Series with the latter club. He was a teammate of pitcher Jimmy Key, among other future major leaguers at Clemson. He was drafted twice—first by the Los Angeles Dodgers in the 4th round of the 1980 MLB January Draft-Regular Phase and again by the Dodgers in the 1st round of the 1980 MLB June Draft-Secondary Phase, between outfielder Dave Gallagher and pitcher Bill Mooneyham. He was signed by scout Bill Bavasi.

He played in the Dodgers system from 1980 to 1985, reaching as high as Triple-A in three seasons. He played for the Lethbridge Dodgers (1980), Lodi Dodgers (1981), Vero Beach Dodgers (1982), San Antonio Dodgers (1983, 1985) and Albuquerque Dukes (1983-1984, 1985). Moving to the Milwaukee Brewers system in 1986, he played for the El Paso Diablos that year. He played in the California Angels and Houston Astros systems in 1987, his final campaign, playing for the Midland Angels and Columbus Astros. In his eight-year career, he posted a slash line of .255/.333/.351 with 526 hits, 19 home runs and 243 RBI.

He later scouted for six years for the Dodgers and worked as a high school coach for 18 years at Waccamaw Academy. He became the Brunswick Community College head baseball coach in 2008.

He is a native of Tabor City, North Carolina.

== Accolades ==
- The Sporting News Minor League Best Defensive Shortstop of the Year Award: 1983
- Region X Coach of The Year: 2010, 2011, 2013
- American Baseball Coaches Association Diamond Sports Regional Coach of the Year: 2013
- All-East Waccamaw 2A Conference Player
- All-Atlantic Coast Conference Player
- North Carolina Independent Schools Athletic Association 1A Baseball Coach of the Year: Earned 10 times
- North Carolina High School Baseball Coaches Association, Coach of the Year: Earned twice
