= 1980 Atlantic Coast Conference baseball tournament =

American college baseball tournament

- Teams: 8
- Format: Eight-team double-elimination tournament
- Finals site: Doak Field; Raleigh, North Carolina
- Champions: Clemson (3rd title)
- Winning coach: Bill Wilhelm (3rd title)
- Attendance: 9,980

1980 Atlantic Coast Conference baseball standings
	Conf.				Overall
Team	W		L	PCT	W		L	PCT
North Carolina ‍†‍‍	11	–	1	.917	39	–	17	.696
Maryland ‍‍‍	9	–	4	.692	24	–	10	.706
No. 8 Clemson ‍‍‡‍^{y}	6	–	5	.545	38	–	21	.644
NC State ‍‍‍	7	–	6	.538	21	–	12	.636
Virginia ‍‍‍	6	–	6	.500	21	–	13	.618
Wake Forest ‍‍‍	5	–	8	.385	17	–	13	.567
Georgia Tech ‍‍‍	3	–	10	.231	8	–	19	.296
Duke ‍‍‍	2	–	9	.182	17	–	11	.607
† – Conference champion ‡ – Tournament champion y – Invited to the NCAA tournament As of June 30, 1980; Rankings from Collegiate Baseball

The 1980 Atlantic Coast Conference baseball tournament was held in Raleigh, North Carolina, from April 22 through 26. Clemson won the tournament and earned the Atlantic Coast Conference's automatic bid to the 1980 NCAA Division I baseball tournament. The tournament was the first held since 1978, as conflicts with exams caused the cancellation of the 1979 tournament.

== Tournament ==
Play-in round (single elim.)
8	Duke	6
1	North Carolina	13
4	NC State	3
5	Virginia	1
6	Wake Forest	0
3	Clemson	4
7	Georgia Tech	2
2	Maryland	9

Upper round 2
4	NC State	3
1	North Carolina	1
3	Clemson	9
2	Maryland	4
Lower round 1
2	Maryland	2
1	North Carolina	7

Upper final
4	NC State	4
3	Clemson	5
Lower final
1	North Carolina	8
4	NC State	4

Championship
3	Clemson	12	—
1	North Carolina	3	—

== See also ==
- College World Series
- NCAA Division I Baseball Championship
