= 1980 Miami Hurricanes baseball team =

American college baseball season

1980 Miami Hurricanes baseball

NCAA East Regional champions

College World Series, 2–2
- Conference: Independent
- Record: 59–12
- Head coach: Ron Fraser (18th year)
- Home stadium: Mark Light Field

1980 NCAA Division I baseball independents standings
	Conf.				Overall
Team	W		L	PCT	W		L	PCT
No. 4 Miami (FL) ‍‍‍^{y}		–		–	59	–	12	.831
No. 7 Florida State ‍‍‍^{y}		–		–	51	–	12	.810
Notre Dame ‍‍‍		–		–	29	–	8	.784
Air Force ‍‍‍		–		–	27	–	9	.750
No. 10 Gonzaga ‍‍‍^{y}		–		–	39	–	15	.722
Stetson ‍‍‍		–		–	34	–	18	.654
Louisville ‍‍‍		–		–	38	–	21	.644
Detroit ‍‍‍		–		–	32	–	21	.604
Campbell ‍‍‍		–		–	18	–	18	.500
Lafayette ‍‍‍		–		–	11	–	13	.458
Northern Iowa ‍‍‍		–		–	12	–	16	.429
Hofstra ‍‍‍		–		–	7	–	28	.200
y – Invited to the NCAA tournament As of June 30, 1980; Rankings from Collegiate Baseball

The 1980 Miami Hurricanes baseball team represented the University of Miami in the 1980 NCAA Division I baseball season. The Hurricanes played their home games at Mark Light Field. The team was coached by Ron Fraser in his 18th season at Miami.

The Hurricanes reached the College World Series, where they were eliminated in the semifinals after recording wins against Clemson and Michigan and losses to eventual runner-up Hawaii and third-place California.

== Personnel ==
=== Roster ===
1980 Miami Hurricanes roster
Pitchers: Bob Bastian; Eddie Escribano; Neal Heaton; Jeff Morrison; Danny Smith; Catchers: Frank Castro	Infielders: Ross Jones; Mike Pagliarulo; Outfielders: Matt Tyner	Unknown: Tony Barquin; Rob Biagini; Dave Bisceglia; Lou Burmester; Alex DeJesus; Rick Del Giudice; Wally Egnatuk; Dave Ferguson; Terry Gallagher; Leigh Gullette; Paul Hundhammer; Mike Kutner; Mike Maude; Matt Minium; George Reyes; Gary Ross

=== Coaches ===
1980 Miami Hurricanes baseball coaching staff
- Ron Fraser – Head coach – 18th year

== Schedule and results ==
Legend
Miami win
Miami loss

1980 Miami Hurricanes baseball game log
Regular season

February
Date	Opponent	Site/stadium	Score	Overall record
Feb 9	Lamar	Mark Light Field • Coral Gables, FL	W 9–1	1–0
Feb 10	Lamar	Mark Light Field • Coral Gables, FL	W 11–5	2–0
Feb 11	Lamar	Mark Light Field • Coral Gables, FL	W 21–1	3–0
Feb 16	at Florida	Perry Field • Gainesville, FL	W 7–0	4–0
Feb 17	at Florida	Perry Field • Gainesville, FL	W 5–0	5–0
Feb 18	at Jacksonville	Jacksonville, FL	W 5–1	6–0
Feb 19	at Jacksonville	Jacksonville, FL	L 6–7	6–1
Feb 19	at Jacksonville	Jacksonville, FL	W 4–0	7–1
Feb 22	Florida State	Mark Light Field • Coral Gables, FL	W 10–0	8–1
Feb 23	Florida State	Mark Light Field • Coral Gables, FL	W 4–3	9–1
Feb 24	Florida State	Mark Light Field • Coral Gables, FL	L 8–9	9–2
Feb 26	Saint Leo	Mark Light Field • Coral Gables, FL	W 7–2	10–2
Feb 27	Saint Leo	Mark Light Field • Coral Gables, FL	W 20–2	11–2
Feb 29	South Alabama	Mark Light Field • Coral Gables, FL	W 2–0	12–2

March
Date	Opponent	Site/stadium	Score	Overall record
Mar 1	South Alabama	Mark Light Field • Coral Gables, FL	L 4–7	12–3
Mar 2	South Alabama	Mark Light Field • Coral Gables, FL	W 7–1	13–3
Mar 4	St. Joseph's	Mark Light Field • Coral Gables, FL	W 6–0	14–3
Mar 5	St. Joseph's	Mark Light Field • Coral Gables, FL	W 12–4	15–3
Mar 6	Buffalo	Mark Light Field • Coral Gables, FL	L 1–2	15–4
Mar 7	at South Florida	Red McEwen Field • Tampa, FL	W 4–3	16–4
Mar 8	at South Florida	Red McEwen Field • Tampa, FL	W 8–0	17–4
Mar 9	Buffalo	Mark Light Field • Coral Gables, FL	W 15–8	18–4
Mar 10	Buffalo	Mark Light Field • Coral Gables, FL	W 14–7	19–4
Mar 12	Indiana State	Mark Light Field • Coral Gables, FL	W 3–1	20–4
Mar 13	Baltimore Orioles	Mark Light Field • Coral Gables, FL	L 2–8	
Mar 14	Oklahoma State	Mark Light Field • Coral Gables, FL	W 2–1	21–4
Mar 15	Indiana State	Mark Light Field • Coral Gables, FL	W 3–1	22–4
Mar 17	Southern Illinois	Mark Light Field • Coral Gables, FL	W 5–1	23–4
Mar 18	Southern Illinois	Mark Light Field • Coral Gables, FL	L 2–5	23–5
Mar 19	Miami (OH)	Mark Light Field • Coral Gables, FL	W 7–2	24–5
Mar 20	Southern Illinois	Mark Light Field • Coral Gables, FL	W 9–4	25–5
Mar 21	Bowling Green	Mark Light Field • Coral Gables, FL	W 7–1	26–5
Mar 22	Southern Illinois	Mark Light Field • Coral Gables, FL	W 8–1	27–5
Mar 25	Delaware	Mark Light Field • Coral Gables, FL	W 11–2	28–5
Mar 26	Florida A&M	Mark Light Field • Coral Gables, FL	W 11–4	29–5
Mar 27	Florida A&M	Mark Light Field • Coral Gables, FL	W 20–1^{7}	30–5
Mar 28	Bowling Green	Mark Light Field • Coral Gables, FL	W 8–3	31–5
Mar 29	Jacksonville	Mark Light Field • Coral Gables, FL	W 8–5	32–5
Mar 30	Jacksonville	Mark Light Field • Coral Gables, FL	W 12–5	33–5
Mar 31	Jacksonville	Mark Light Field • Coral Gables, FL	W 14–2	34–5

April
Date	Opponent	Site/stadium	Score	Overall record
Apr 2	South Carolina	Mark Light Field • Coral Gables, FL	W 9–0	35–5
Apr 3	South Carolina	Mark Light Field • Coral Gables, FL	W 5–0	36–5
Apr 4	South Carolina	Mark Light Field • Coral Gables, FL	L 5–15	36–6
Apr 5	South Carolina	Mark Light Field • Coral Gables, FL	L 1–8	36–7
Apr 8	at FIU	Miami, FL	W 10–2	37–7
Apr 11	at Texas A&M	Olsen Field • College Station, TX	W 8–1	38–7
Apr 12	at Texas A&M	Olsen Field • College Station, TX	W 4–1^{7}	39–7
Apr 15	Biscayne	Mark Light Field • Coral Gables, FL	W 7–4	40–7
Apr 16	Biscayne	Mark Light Field • Coral Gables, FL	W 2–1	41–7
Apr 18	South Florida	Mark Light Field • Coral Gables, FL	W 6–4	42–7
Apr 19	Biscayne	Mark Light Field • Coral Gables, FL	W 9–4	43–7
Apr 22	FIU	Mark Light Field • Coral Gables, FL	L 4–6	43–8
Apr 25	Stetson	Mark Light Field • Coral Gables, FL	W 17–6	44–8
Apr 26	Stetson	Mark Light Field • Coral Gables, FL	W 11–4	45–8
Apr 27	Stetson	Mark Light Field • Coral Gables, FL	W 3–2	46–8
Apr 29	FIU	Mark Light Field • Coral Gables, FL	W 13–6	47–8
Apr 30	Biscayne	Mark Light Field • Coral Gables, FL	W 15–0	48–8

May
Date	Opponent	Site/stadium	Score	Overall record
May 3	at Florida State	Seminole Field • Tallahassee, FL	W 10–6	49–8
May 4	at Florida State	Seminole Field • Tallahassee, FL	L 5–7	49–9
May 5	at Florida State	Seminole Field • Tallahassee, FL	W 7–5	50–9
May 6	at Florida A&M	Tallahassee, FL	L 3–4^{10}	50–10
May 7	at Florida A&M	Tallahassee, FL	W 13–6	51–10
May 8	at Mercer	Claude Smith Field • Macon, GA	W 9–2	52–10
May 9	at Mercer	Claude Smith Field • Macon, GA	W 8–2	53–10
May 10	at Mercer	Claude Smith Field • Macon, GA	W 4–3	54–10

Postseason

NCAA East Regional
Date	Opponent	Site/stadium	Score	Overall record	NCAAT record
May 25	South Alabama	Mark Light Field • Coral Gables, FL	W 15–6	55–10	1–0
May 26	James Madison	Mark Light Field • Coral Gables, FL	W 10–3	56–10	2–0
May 27	Delaware	Mark Light Field • Coral Gables, FL	W 10–1	57–10	3–0

College World Series
Date	Opponent	Site/stadium	Score	Overall record	CWS record
May 31	Clemson	Johnny Rosenblatt Stadium • Omaha, NE	W 13–5	58–10	1–0
June 2	Michigan	Johnny Rosenblatt Stadium • Omaha, NE	W 3–2	59–10	2–0
June 3	Hawaii	Johnny Rosenblatt Stadium • Omaha, NE	L 3–9	59–11	2–1
June 4	California	Johnny Rosenblatt Stadium • Omaha, NE	L 3–4	59–12	2–2
