= 1980 Florida State Seminoles baseball team =

American college baseball season

1980 Florida State Seminoles baseball

NCAA South Regional champions Metro tournament champions

College World Series, 0–2
- Conference: Metro Conference (1975–1995)
- Record: 51–12 ( Metro)
- Head coach: Mike Martin (1st year)
- Home stadium: Seminole Field

The 1980 Florida State Seminoles baseball team represented Florida State University in the 1980 NCAA Division I baseball season. The Seminoles played their home games at Seminole Field. The team was coached by Mike Martin in his first season as head coach at Florida State.

The Seminoles reached the College World Series, their seventh appearance in Omaha, where they finished tied for seventh place after recording losses to eventual runner-up Hawaii and eventual champion Arizona.

== Personnel ==
=== Roster ===
1980 Florida State Seminoles roster
Pitchers: 6 - Jeff Ledbetter - Sophomore; 17 - Ed Schneider - Junior; 25 - John Wolfer - Senior; 26 - Ken Smith - Senior; 30 - Keith Parenteau - Junior; 32 - Allen Swindle - Sophomore; 33 - Rick Hatcher - Junior; 39 - Dick Wiggins - Senior; 43 - Jay Keeler - Sophomore; 44 - Tim Phillips - Junior; 46 - David Smalley - Freshman; 49 - Ken Fischer - Junior	Catchers: - Bart Birnbaum - Sophomore; 9 - Jack Emerick - Senior; 13 - Tim Hatcher - Junior; 21 - Craig Ramsey - (redshirt) Junior; 34 - Keith Craig - Freshman; Outfielders: 2 - Jim Weaver - Junior; 8 - Mike Yastrzemski - Freshman; 10 - Ken Huff - Junior; 22 - John Gagnon - Senior; 29 - Mike Fuentes - Junior; 42 - Mike Cullen - Junior	Infielders: - Bill Keck - Junior; 4 - Lionel Martinez - Junior; 12 - Rick Figueredo - Freshman; 15 - Roy Alvarez - Junior; 18 - George Tebbetts - Sophomore; 20 - Don DeLoach - Junior; 47 - Ed Howser - Junior

=== Coaches ===
1980 Florida State Seminoles baseball coaching staff
- Mike Martin - Head coach - 1st year
- Jim Morris - Assistant coach - 1st year

== Schedule and results ==
Legend
Florida State win
Florida State loss

1980 Florida State Seminoles baseball game log
Regular season

February
Date	Opponent	Site/stadium	Score	Overall record
Feb 22	at Miami (FL)	Mark Light Field • Coral Gables, FL	L 0–10	0–1
Feb 23	at Miami (FL)	Mark Light Field • Coral Gables, FL	L 3–4	0–2
Feb 24	at Miami (FL)	Mark Light Field • Coral Gables, FL	W 9–8	1–2
Feb 27	Troy State	Seminole Field • Tallahassee, FL	W 5–3	2–2
Feb 27	Troy State	Seminole Field • Tallahassee, FL	W 11–9	3–2

March
Date	Opponent	Site/stadium	Score	Overall record
Mar 3	Lenoir-Rhyne	Seminole Field • Tallahassee, FL	W 10–3	4–2
Mar 4	at Jacksonville	Jacksonville, FL	W 8–4	5–2
Mar 5	at Jacksonville	Jacksonville, FL	W 17–8	6–2
Mar 5	at Jacksonville	Jacksonville, FL	W 16–3	7–2
Mar 8	Florida	Seminole Field • Tallahassee, FL	L 6–21	7–3
Mar 11	Wingate	Seminole Field • Tallahassee, FL	W 6–0	8–3
Mar 11	Wingate	Seminole Field • Tallahassee, FL	W 5–4	9–3
Mar 13	Missouri S&T	Seminole Field • Tallahassee, FL	W 18–3	10–3
Mar 13	Missouri S&T	Seminole Field • Tallahassee, FL	W 13–0	11–3
Mar 16	Brooklyn	Seminole Field • Tallahassee, FL	W 23–5	12–3
Mar 17	Northern Kentucky	Seminole Field • Tallahassee, FL	W 2–0	13–3
Mar 18	Mercer	Seminole Field • Tallahassee, FL	W 9–7	14–3
Mar 19	Monmouth	Seminole Field • Tallahassee, FL	W 27–2	15–3
Mar 21	Otterbein	Seminole Field • Tallahassee, FL	W 18–3	16–3
Mar 21	Otterbein	Seminole Field • Tallahassee, FL	W 15–6	17–3
Mar 22	Wright State	Seminole Field • Tallahassee, FL	W 12–0	18–3
Mar 22	Wright State	Seminole Field • Tallahassee, FL	L 2–6	18–4
Mar 24	at Tulane	Tulane Diamond • New Orleans, LA	L 2–3	18–5
Mar 27	Eastern Illinois	Seminole Field • Tallahassee, FL	W 10–9	19–5
Mar 29	Dayton	Seminole Field • Tallahassee, FL	W 28–2	20–5
Mar 31	at Mercer	Claude Smith Field • Macon, GA	W 7–4	21–5

April
Date	Opponent	Site/stadium	Score	Overall record
Apr 5	Jacksonville	Seminole Field • Tallahassee, FL	W 7–6	22–5
Apr 5	Jacksonville	Seminole Field • Tallahassee, FL	W 15–3	23–5
Apr 6	Jacksonville	Seminole Field • Tallahassee, FL	W 5–1	24–5
Apr 7	at Valdosta State	Valdosta, GA	W 15–9	25–5
Apr 9	Auburn	Seminole Field • Tallahassee, FL	W 21–7	26–5
Apr 9	Auburn	Seminole Field • Tallahassee, FL	W 2–0	27–5
Apr 11	at South Florida	Red McEwen Field • Tampa, FL	W 12–0	28–5
Apr 12	at South Florida	Red McEwen Field • Tampa, FL	W 3–1	29–5
Apr 12	at South Florida	Red McEwen Field • Tampa, FL	W 14–3	30–5
Apr 15	at Florida	Perry Field • Gainesville, FL	W 2–1	31–5
Apr 16	at Florida	Perry Field • Gainesville, FL	W 15–2	32–5
Apr 20	Flagler	Seminole Field • Tallahassee, FL	W 12–1	33–5
Apr 22	at Auburn	Plainsman Park • Auburn, AL	W 9–5	34–5
Apr 23	at Auburn	Plainsman Park • Auburn, AL	W 4–2	35–5
Apr 25	South Florida	Seminole Field • Tallahassee, FL	W 10–4	36–5
Apr 26	South Florida	Seminole Field • Tallahassee, FL	W 17–0	37–5
Apr 26	South Florida	Seminole Field • Tallahassee, FL	W 5–4	38–5
Apr 29	at Troy State	Riddle–Pace Field • Troy, AL	L 3–5 (Note: Game was forfeited in the sixth inning.)	38–6
Apr 29	at Troy State	Riddle–Pace Field • Troy, AL	W 12–3	39–6
Apr 30	Valdosta State	Seminole Field • Tallahassee, FL	W 11–4	40–6

May
Date	Opponent	Site/stadium	Score	Overall record
May 3	Miami (FL)	Seminole Field • Tallahassee, FL	L 6–10	40–7
May 4	Miami (FL)	Seminole Field • Tallahassee, FL	W 7–5	41–7
May 5	Miami (FL)	Seminole Field • Tallahassee, FL	L 5–7	41–8

Postseason

Metro Conference Tournament
Date	Opponent	Site/stadium	Score	Overall record	Tourn Record
May 9	Virginia Tech	Seminole Field • Tallahassee, FL	L 4–12	41–9	0–1
May 9	Louisville	Seminole Field • Tallahassee, FL	W 19–7	42–9	1–1
May 10	Tulane	Seminole Field • Tallahassee, FL	W 10–5	43–9	2–1
May 10	Virginia Tech	Seminole Field • Tallahassee, FL	W 10–5	44–9	3–1
May 11	Memphis State	Seminole Field • Tallahassee, FL	W 10–5	45–9	4–1
May 11	Memphis State	Seminole Field • Tallahassee, FL	W 10–5	46–9	5–1

May
Date	Opponent	Site/stadium	Score	Overall record
May 13	at Georgia Southern	Statesboro, GA	W 5–3	47–9
May 14	at Georgia Southern	Statesboro, GA	W 13–11	48–9
May 14	at Georgia Southern	Statesboro, GA	L 3–8	48–10

NCAA South Regional
Date	Opponent	Site/stadium	Score	Overall record	NCAAT record
May 23	New Orleans	Seminole Field • Tallahassee, FL	W 10–0	49–10	1–0
May 24	Western Kentucky	Seminole Field • Tallahassee, FL	W 19–7	50–10	2–0
May 25	Western Kentucky	Seminole Field • Tallahassee, FL	W 10–5	51–10	3–0

College World Series
Date	Opponent	Site/stadium	Score	Overall record	CWS record
May 30	Hawaii	Johnny Rosenblatt Stadium • Omaha, NE	L 6–7	51–11	0–1
June 1	Arizona	Johnny Rosenblatt Stadium • Omaha, NE	L 3–5	51–12	0–2
