= Marc Ronan =

American baseball player (born 1969)

- Catcher
- Born: September 19, 1969 (age 56); Ozark, Alabama, U.S.
- Batted: Left Threw: Right

MLB debut
- September 21, 1993, for the St. Louis Cardinals

Last MLB appearance
- October 3, 1993, for the St. Louis Cardinals

MLB statistics
- Batting average: .083
- At-bats: 12
- Stats at Baseball Reference

Teams
- St. Louis Cardinals (1993)

Edward Marcus Ronan (born September 19, 1969) is an American former Major League Baseball catcher who played in six games for the St. Louis Cardinals in 1993. Ronan also spent eleven seasons in the minor league organizations of the Cardinals, Florida Marlins, New York Yankees, Houston Astros and Philadelphia Phillies.
