= 1980 Michigan Wolverines baseball team =

American college baseball season

1980 Michigan Wolverines baseball

Big Ten Conference

College World Series, T-5th
- Conference: Big Ten Conference

Ranking
- Coaches: No. 6
- CB: No. 6
- Record: 36–18–1 (14–2 Big Ten)
- Head coach: Bud Middaugh (1st season)
- Assistant coach: Danny Hall (1st season)
- Hitting coach: Terry Hunter (1st season)
- MVP: Gerry Hool
- Home stadium: Ray Fisher Stadium

1980 Big Ten Conference baseball standings
| | Conf. | | | | | | Overall |
| Team | W | | L | | T | PCT | W | | L | | T | PCT |
|---|---|---|---|---|---|---|---|---|---|---|---|---|
| No. 6 Michigan ‍†‍‍^{y} | 14 | – | 2 | – | 0 | .875 | 36 | – | 18 | – | 1 | .664 |
| Minnesota ‍‍‍ | 14 | – | 4 | – | 0 | .778 | 33 | – | 13 | – | 0 | .717 |
| Iowa ‍‍‍ | 11 | – | 5 | – | 0 | .688 | 31 | – | 14 | – | 0 | .689 |
| Wisconsin ‍‍‍ | 10 | – | 8 | – | 0 | .556 | 23 | – | 24 | – | 1 | .490 |
| Purdue ‍‍‍ | 7 | – | 9 | – | 0 | .438 | 27 | – | 24 | – | 0 | .529 |
| Ohio State ‍‍‍ | 6 | – | 10 | – | 0 | .375 | 18 | – | 25 | – | 0 | .419 |
| Indiana ‍‍‍ | 6 | – | 10 | – | 0 | .375 | 17 | – | 25 | – | 0 | .405 |
| Illinois ‍‍‍ | 6 | – | 10 | – | 0 | .375 | 18 | – | 33 | – | 1 | .356 |
| Northwestern ‍‍‍ | 5 | – | 11 | – | 0 | .313 | 20 | – | 21 | – | 1 | .488 |
| Michigan State ‍‍‍ | 3 | – | 13 | – | 0 | .188 | 15 | – | 35 | – | 0 | .300 |
† – Conference champion y – Invited to the NCAA tournament As of June 30, 1980; Rankings from Collegiate Baseball

The 1980 Michigan Wolverines baseball team represented the University of Michigan in the 1980 NCAA Division I baseball season. The head coach was Bud Middaugh, serving his 1st year. The Wolverines finished the season in 5th place in the 1980 College World Series.

== Roster ==
1980 Michigan Wolverines baseball team
Players
Coaches

| # | Pos. | Name | B/T | Height | Weight | Year | Home town |
|---|---|---|---|---|---|---|---|
| | C | Charles Arvai III | / | — | — |
| | INF | Patrick Balaze | / | — | — | Sr |
| 6 | RHP | Mark Clinton | /R | 6 ft 1 in (1.85 m) | 185 lb (84 kg) | Jr |
| | | F. W. Davenport | / | — | — |
| | P | Scott Dawson | / | — | — | Fr | Plymouth, Michigan |
| | | George Derby | / | — | — |
| | RHP | Scot Elam | /R | 6 ft 4 in (1.93 m) | 210 lb (95 kg) |
| | OF | Frederick Erdmann | / | — | — |
| | P | Anthony Erpenback | / | — | — |
| 9 | INF | Tony Evans | R/R | 6 ft 0 in (1.83 m) | 175 lb (79 kg) | Fr | Franklin, Ohio |
| | INF | George Foussianes | R/R | 6 ft 1 in (1.85 m) | 190 lb (86 kg) | Sr | Birmingham, Michigan |
| | OF | Thomas Fredal | / | — | — |
| | | Maurice French | / | — | — |
| | | James Gallagher | / | — | — | So |
| | INF | Garrick Gawrych | / | — | — | Fr |
| | C | Gerald Hool | R/R | — | — | Jr |
| | INF | Jeffery Jacobson | R/R | 6 ft 1 in (1.85 m) | 185 lb (84 kg) | Fr |
| 26 | P | Timothy Karazim | / | — | — | Fr | Jackson, Michigan |
| | P | Michael Kazmierski | / | — | — |
| | INF | Timothy Miller | / | — | — |
| 29 | P | David Nuss | / | — | — |
| 16 | RHP | Steve Ontiveros | R/R | 6 ft 0 in (1.83 m) | 180 lb (82 kg) | Fr | Tularosa, New Mexico |
| 19 | OF | Jim Paciorek | R/R | 6 ft 3 in (1.91 m) | 203 lb (92 kg) | So | Detroit, Michigan |
| | OF | Greg Schulte | / | — | — | Jr |
| | C | Chris Shea | / | — | — |
| 8 | C | Sherman Stenson | R/R | 5 ft 11 in (1.8 m) | 175 lb (79 kg) | Sr | Farmington, Michigan |
| | OF | Daniel Sygar | / | — | — |
| | C | Jaime Vela | / | — | — |
| 7 | INF | Charles Wagner | R/R | — | — | Sr | Madison Heights, Michigan |
| 12 | P | Joe Wissing | / | — | — | | Southfield, Michigan |
| | OF | Randal Wroten | / | — | — | Jr | Novi, Michigan |
| 10 | C | John Young | L/R | 6 ft 4 in (1.93 m) | 205 lb (93 kg) | So | Sterling Heights, Michigan |

Head coach

27 Bud Middaugh

Assistant coach(es)

17 Danny Hall
41 Terry Hunter

Legend

- (C) Team captain
- (S) Suspended
- (I) Ineligible
- Injured
- Current redshirt

== Schedule ==
1980 Michigan Wolverines baseball game log
Regular season
February (0–2)

| # | Date | Opponent | Site/stadium | Score | Overall record | Big Ten record |
|---|---|---|---|---|---|---|
| 1 | February 28 | at Tampa | UT Baseball Field • Tampa, Florida | 7–11 | 0–1 | 0–0 |
| 2 | February 29 | at Eckerd | Unknown • St. Petersburg, Florida | 6–8 | 0–2 | 0–0 |

March (6–5)

| # | Date | Opponent | Site/stadium | Score | Overall record | Big Ten record |
|---|---|---|---|---|---|---|
| 3 | March 3 | vs Old Dominion | Unknown • Lakeland, Florida | 8–3 | 1–2 | 0–0 |
| 4 | March 3 | vs Western Michigan | Unknown • Lakeland, Florida | 8–3 | 2–2 | 0–0 |
| 5 | March 4 | vs Missouri | Unknown • Lakeland, Florida | 0–1 | 2–3 | 0–0 |
| 6 | March 4 | vs Old Dominion | Unknown • Lakeland, Florida | 7–4 | 3–3 | 0–0 |
| 7 | March 6 | vs Old Dominion | Unknown • Lakeland, Florida | 0–8 | 3–4 | 0–0 |
| 8 | March 6 | vs Old Dominion | Unknown • Lakeland, Florida | 4–2 | 4–4 | 0–0 |
| 9 | March 7 | at Tampa | UT Baseball Field • Tampa, Florida | 4–14 | 4–5 | 0–0 |
| 10 | March 9 | vs Missouri | Unknown • Lakeland, Florida | 2–3 | 4–6 | 0–0 |
| 11 | March 10 | vs Temple | Unknown • Lakeland, Florida | 5–3 | 5–6 | 0–0 |
| 12 | March 10 | vs Eckerd | Unknown • Lakeland, Florida | 1–4 | 5–7 | 0–0 |
| 13 | March 11 | vs Purdue | Unknown • Lakeland, Florida | 7–4 | 6–7 | 0–0 |
| 14 | March 29 | Grand Valley State | Ray Fisher Stadium • Ann Arbor, Michigan | 3–0 | 7–7 | 0–0 |
| 15 | March 29 | Grand Valley State | Ray Fisher Stadium • Ann Arbor, Michigan | 0–3 | 7–8 | 0–0 |

April (14–4–1)

| # | Date | Opponent | Site/stadium | Score | Overall record | Big Ten record |
|---|---|---|---|---|---|---|
| 16 | April 2 | Bowling Green | Ray Fisher Stadium • Ann Arbor, Michigan | 5–0 | 8–8 | 0–0 |
| 17 | April 2 | Bowling Green | Ray Fisher Stadium • Ann Arbor, Michigan | 11–0 | 9–8 | 0–0 |
| 18 | April 5 | Wayne State | Ray Fisher Stadium • Ann Arbor, Michigan | 9–0 | 10–8 | 0–0 |
| 19 | April 5 | Wayne State | Ray Fisher Stadium • Ann Arbor, Michigan | 1–0 | 11–8 | 0–0 |
| 20 | April 8 | vs Western Michigan | Unknown • Unknown, Michigan | 7–9 | 11–9 | 0–0 |
| 21 | April 12 | Michigan State | Ray Fisher Stadium • Ann Arbor, Michigan | 7–0 | 12–9 | 1–0 |
| 22 | April 13 | at Michigan State | Ray Fisher Stadium • East Lansing, Michigan | 7–0 | 13–9 | 2–0 |
| 23 | April 15 | vs Central Michigan | Unknown • Unknown, Michigan | 2–11 | 13–10 | 2–0 |
| 24 | April 15 | vs Central Michigan | Unknown • Unknown, Michigan | 5–5 | 13–10–1 | 2–0 |
| 25 | April 19 | vs Minnesota | Siebert Field • Minneapolis, Minnesota | 2–13 | 13–11–1 | 2–1 |
| 26 | April 19 | at Minnesota | Siebert Field • Minneapolis, Minnesota | 7–2 | 14–11–1 | 3–1 |
| 27 | April 20 | at Wisconsin | Guy Lowman Field • Madison, Wisconsin | 5–2 | 15–11–1 | 4–1 |
| 28 | April 20 | at Wisconsin | Guy Lowman Field • Madison, Wisconsin | 4–1 | 16–11–1 | 5–1 |
| 29 | April 22 | Wayne State | Unknown • Unknown, Michigan | 4–3 | 17–11–1 | 5–1 |
| 30 | April 22 | Wayne State | Unknown • Unknown, Michigan | 11–3 | 18–11–1 | 5–1 |
| 31 | April 23 | Western Michigan | Unknown • Unknown, Michigan | 1–3 | 18–12–1 | 5–1 |
| 32 | April 23 | Western Michigan | Unknown • Unknown, Michigan | 9–4 | 19–12–1 | 5–1 |
| 33 | April 27 | Eastern Michigan | Unknown • Unknown, Michigan | 8–4 | 20–12–1 | 5–1 |
| 34 | April 27 | Eastern Michigan | Unknown • Unknown, Michigan | 4–2 | 21–12–1 | 5–1 |

May (11–4)

| # | Date | Opponent | Site/stadium | Score | Overall record | Big Ten record |
|---|---|---|---|---|---|---|
| 35 | May 3 | Purdue | Ray Fisher Stadium • Ann Arbor, Michigan | 5–2 | 22–12–1 | 6–1 |
| 36 | May 3 | Purdue | Ray Fisher Stadium • Ann Arbor, Michigan | 4–3 | 23–12–1 | 7–1 |
| 37 | May 4 | Illinois | Ray Fisher Stadium • Ann Arbor, Michigan | 7–2 | 24–12–1 | 8–1 |
| 38 | May 4 | Illinois | Ray Fisher Stadium • Ann Arbor, Michigan | 8–7 | 25–12–1 | 9–1 |
| 39 | May 7 | vs Eastern Michigan | Unknown • Unknown, Michigan | 4–3 | 26–12–1 | 9–1 |
| 40 | May 7 | vs Eastern Michigan | Unknown • Unknown, Michigan | 6–10 | 26–13–1 | 9–1 |
| 41 | May 10 | Ohio State | Ray Fisher Stadium • Ann Arbor, Michigan | 4–0 | 27–13–1 | 10–1 |
| 42 | May 10 | Ohio State | Ray Fisher Stadium • Ann Arbor, Michigan | 7–1 | 28–13–1 | 11–1 |
| 43 | May 11 | Indiana | Ray Fisher Stadium • Ann Arbor, Michigan | 1–0 | 29–13–1 | 12–1 |
| 44 | May 11 | Indiana | Ray Fisher Stadium • Ann Arbor, Michigan | 18–4 | 30–13–1 | 13–1 |
| 45 | May 13 | vs Toledo | Unknown • Unknown | 4–7 | 30–14–1 | 13–1 |
| 46 | May 14 | vs Detroit | Unknown • Unknown, Michigan | 9–8 | 31–14–1 | 13–1 |
| 47 | May 14 | vs Detroit | Unknown • Unknown, Michigan | 8–9 | 31–15–1 | 13–1 |
| 48 | May 18 | vs Northwestern | Unknown • Unknown | 5–0 | 32–15–1 | 14–1 |
| 49 | May 18 | vs Northwestern | Unknown • Unknown | 2–3 | 32–16–1 | 14–2 |

Postseason
Mideast Regional (3–0)

| # | Date | Opponent | Site/stadium | Score | Overall record | Big Ten record |
|---|---|---|---|---|---|---|
| 50 | May 22 | Central Michigan | Ray Fisher Stadium • Ann Arbor, Michigan | 9–4 | 33–16–1 | 14–2 |
| 51 | May 23 | Nebraska | Ray Fisher Stadium • Ann Arbor, Michigan | 7–0 | 34–16–1 | 14–2 |
| 52 | May 23 | Nebraska | Ray Fisher Stadium • Ann Arbor, Michigan | 12–3 | 35–16–1 | 14–2 |

1980 College World Series (1–2)

| # | Date | Opponent | Site/stadium | Score | Overall record | Big Ten record |
|---|---|---|---|---|---|---|
| 53 | June 1 | vs California | Johnny Rosenblatt Stadium • Omaha, Nebraska | 9–8 | 36–16–1 | 14–2 |
| 54 | June 2 | vs Miami (FL) | Johnny Rosenblatt Stadium • Omaha, Nebraska | 2–3 | 36–17–1 | 14–2 |
| 55 | June 2 | vs Arizona | Johnny Rosenblatt Stadium • Omaha, Nebraska | 0–8 | 36–18–1 | 14–2 |

== Awards and honors ==
Scott Dawson

- First Team All-Big Ten

George Foussianes

- First Team All-Big Ten
- Third Team All-American (ABCA)

Jim Paciorek

- First Team All-Big Ten
- College World Series Most Outstanding Player
