= Greg Bargar =

American baseball player (born 1959)

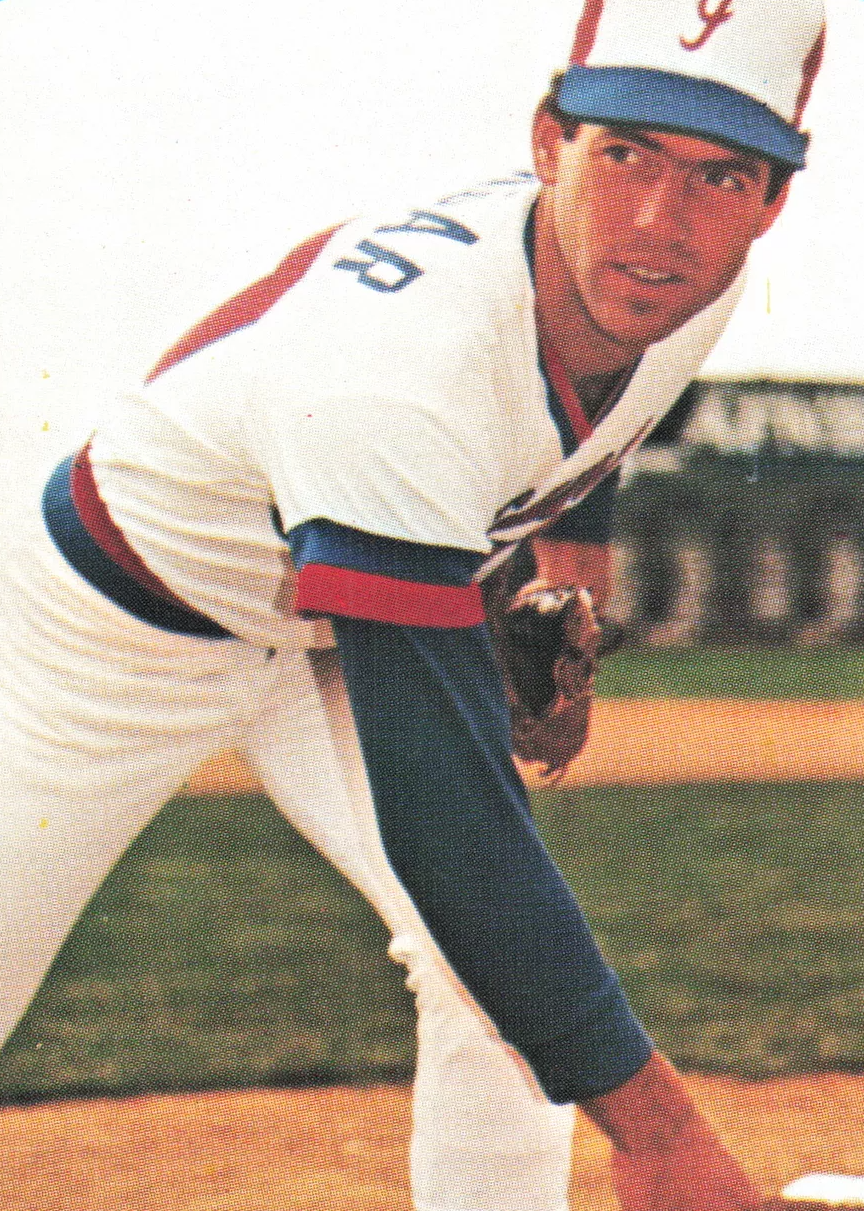
- Bargar with the Indianapolis Indians c. 1984
- Pitcher
- Born: January 27, 1959 (age 67); Inglewood, California, U.S.
- Batted: Right Threw: Right

MLB debut
- July 17, 1983, for the Montreal Expos

Last MLB appearance
- October 2, 1986, for the St. Louis Cardinals

MLB statistics
- Win–loss record: 2–3
- Earned run average: 6.34
- Strikeouts: 23
- Stats at Baseball Reference

Teams
- Montreal Expos (1983–1984); St. Louis Cardinals (1986)

Greg Robert Bargar (born January 27, 1959) is an American former Major League Baseball pitcher. Barger played for the Montreal Expos from 1983 to 1984 and the St. Louis Cardinals in 1986.

Bargar attended South High School in Torrance, California. He attended Cal Poly on a college football but transferred to El Camino Junior College after one year. At El Camino, he was moved from the quarterback to wide receiver position and, as a result, began taking more of an interest in baseball than football. He then transferred to the University of Arizona where he played baseball for the Wildcats. Bargar got the final out of the 1980 College World Series for the Wildcats.
