= 1980 Clemson Tigers baseball team =

American college baseball season

1980 Clemson Tigers baseball

ACC tournament champions Atlantic Regional champions

College World Series, 0–2
- Conference: Atlantic Coast Conference
- CB: No. 8
- Record: 38–21 (6–5 ACC)
- Head coach: Bill Wilhelm
- Home stadium: Beautiful Tiger Field

1980 Atlantic Coast Conference baseball standings
	Conf.				Overall
Team	W		L	PCT	W		L	PCT
North Carolina ‍†‍‍	11	–	1	.917	39	–	17	.696
Maryland ‍‍‍	9	–	4	.692	24	–	10	.706
No. 8 Clemson ‍‍‡‍^{y}	6	–	5	.545	38	–	21	.644
NC State ‍‍‍	7	–	6	.538	21	–	12	.636
Virginia ‍‍‍	6	–	6	.500	21	–	13	.618
Wake Forest ‍‍‍	5	–	8	.385	17	–	13	.567
Georgia Tech ‍‍‍	3	–	10	.231	8	–	19	.296
Duke ‍‍‍	2	–	9	.182	17	–	11	.607
† – Conference champion ‡ – Tournament champion y – Invited to the NCAA tournament As of June 30, 1980; Rankings from Collegiate Baseball

The 1980 Clemson Tigers baseball team represented Clemson University in the 1980 NCAA Division I baseball season. The team played their home games at Beautiful Tiger Field in Clemson, South Carolina.

The team was coached by Bill Wilhelm, who completed his twenty-third season at Clemson. The Tigers reached the 1980 College World Series, their fifth appearance in Omaha.

== Roster ==
1980 Clemson Tigers roster
Pitchers: - Len Bradley; - Mike Brown - Junior; - Bill Duke; - Bobby Kenyon - Junior; - Jimmy Key - Freshman; - Billy Trapp	Catchers: - Dave Lemaster - Freshman; - Danny Sheaffer; Infielders: - Robbie Allen - Junior; - Greg Guin - Sophomore; - Tim Teufel - Senior; - Craig Roberson - Freshman; - Frank Russ - Freshman; - Sputty Evans - ‘’Freshman’’; Outfielders: - Glenn Gallagher - Freshman; - Neil Simons - Senior; - Billy Weems - Senior; - Jay Sexton - Junior	Unknown: - Bill Castelli; - Steve Van Dyke

== Schedule ==
Legend
	Clemson win
	Clemson loss
**Bold**	Clemson team member
*	Non-Conference game

1980 Clemson Tigers baseball game log
Regular season

February
Date	Opponent	Site/stadium	Score	Overall record	ACC record
Feb 21	Erskine*	Beautiful Tiger Field • Clemson, SC	**W** 8–0	1–0	
Feb 22	at Valdosta State*	Blazer Field • Valdosta, GA	**L** 2–6	1–1	
Feb 23	at Florida*	Perry Field • Gainesville, FL	**L** 3–4	1–2	
Feb 25	at Florida*	Perry Field • Gainesville, FL	**L** 0–6	1–3	
Feb 27	Georgia*	Beautiful Tiger Field • Clemson, SC	**W** 22–7	2–3	
Feb 28	Western Carolina*	Beautiful Tiger Field • Clemson, SC	**W** 10–2	3–3	

March
Date	Opponent	Site/stadium	Score	Overall record	ACC record
Mar 1	at Georgia*	Foley Field • Athens, GA	**W** 8–5	4–3	
Mar 7	East Tennessee State*	Beautiful Tiger Field • Clemson, SC	**L** 2–3	4–4	
Mar 9	East Tennessee State*	Beautiful Tiger Field • Clemson, SC	**L** 1–3^{11}	4–5	
Mar 9	East Tennessee State*	Beautiful Tiger Field • Clemson, SC	**W** 8–0^{7}	5–5	
Mar 10	UNC Wilmington*	Beautiful Tiger Field • Clemson, SC	**W** 2–0^{7}	6–5	
Mar 10	UNC Wilmington*	Beautiful Tiger Field • Clemson, SC	**L** 1–3^{7}	6–6	
Mar 11	UNC Wilmington*	Beautiful Tiger Field • Clemson, SC	**W** 8–2	7–6	
Mar 14	Wake Forest	Beautiful Tiger Field • Clemson, SC	**W** 5–4^{10}	8–6	1–0
Mar 15	at Stetson*	Conrad Park • DeLand, FL	**W** 10–7	9–6	
Mar 17	vs Cincinnati*	Harper-Shepherd Field • Winter Park, FL	**L** 7–10	9–7	
Mar 18	at Rollins*	Harper-Shepherd Field • Winter Park, FL	**W** 3–2	10–7	
Mar 19	vs Cornell*	Harper-Shepherd Field • Winter Park, FL	**W** 5–0	11–7	
Mar 20	vs Cincinnati*	Harper-Shepherd Field • Winter Park, FL	**W** 8–2	12–7	
Mar 21	at Rollins*	Harper-Shepherd Field • Winter Park, FL	**L** 1–5	12–8	
Mar 22	vs Cornell*	Harper-Shepherd Field • Winter Park, FL	**L** 6–7^{10}	12–9	
Mar 25	Ohio State*	Beautiful Tiger Field • Clemson, SC	**W** 4–1	13–9	
Mar 26	Ohio State*	Beautiful Tiger Field • Clemson, SC	**W** 2–0	14–9	
Mar 27	Ohio State*	Beautiful Tiger Field • Clemson, SC	**W** 6–0^{7}	15–9	
Mar 27	Ohio State*	Beautiful Tiger Field • Clemson, SC	**W** 8–3^{7}	16–9	
Mar 31	Howard*	Beautiful Tiger Field • Clemson, SC	**W** 12–1	17–9	

April
Date	Opponent	Site/stadium	Score	Overall record	ACC record
Apr 1	Howard*	Beautiful Tiger Field • Clemson, SC	**W** 4–2	18–9	
Apr 3	Georgia Tech	Beautiful Tiger Field • Clemson, SC	**W** 18–1	19–9	2–0
Apr 5	North Carolina	Beautiful Tiger Field • Clemson, SC	**L** 3–14	19–10	2–1
Apr 6	NC State	Beautiful Tiger Field • Clemson, SC	**L** 3–6	19–11	2–2
Apr 7	Francis Marion*	Beautiful Tiger Field • Clemson, SC	**W** 3–2	20–11	
Apr 9	at Georgia Tech	Rose Bowl Field • Atlanta, GA	**L** 10–12	20–12	2–3
Apr 10	at Western Carolina*	Childress Field • Cullowhee, NC	**W** 14–8	21–12	
Apr 11	at Wake Forest	Ernie Shore Field • Winston-Salem, NC	**L** 4–5	21–13	2–4
Apr 12	at North Carolina	Boshamer Stadium • Chapel Hill, NC	**L** 3–4	21–14	2–5
Apr 15	South Carolina*	Beautiful Tiger Field • Clemson, SC	**W** 9–3	22–14	
Apr 16	South Carolina*	Beautiful Tiger Field • Clemson, SC	**W** 4–3	23–14	
Apr 17	Virginia	Beautiful Tiger Field • Clemson, SC	**W** 3–1	24–14	3–5
Apr 18	Virginia	Beautiful Tiger Field • Clemson, SC	**W** 6–5	25–14	4–5
Apr 19	Maryland	Beautiful Tiger Field • Clemson, SC	**W** 1–0	26–14	5–5
Apr 20	Maryland	Beautiful Tiger Field • Clemson, SC	**W** 5–2	27–14	6–5

Postseason

ACC Tournament
Date	Opponent	Site/stadium	Score	Overall record	ACCT record
Apr 22	Wake Forest	Doak Field • Raleigh, NC	**W** 4–0	28–14	1–0
Apr 24	Maryland	Doak Field • Raleigh, NC	**W** 9–4	29–14	2–0
Apr 25	NC State	Doak Field • Raleigh, NC	**W** 5–4	30–14	3–0
Apr 26	North Carolina	Doak Field • Raleigh, NC	**W** 12–3	31–14	4–0

May
Date	Opponent	Site/stadium	Score	Overall record	ACC record
May 3	Virginia Tech*	Beautiful Tiger Field • Clemson, SC	**L** 2–4	31–15	
May 4	Virginia Tech*	Beautiful Tiger Field • Clemson, SC	**W** 8–0	32–15	
May 5	at Georgia Southern*	J. I. Clements Stadium • Statesboro, GA	**W** 13–3	33–15	
May 6	at Georgia Southern*	J. I. Clements Stadium • Statesboro, GA	**W** 10–8^{10}	34–15	
May 7	at Georgia Southern*	J. I. Clements Stadium • Statesboro, GA	**L** 5–14	34–16	
May 8	at Tennessee*	Lower Hudson Field • Knoxville, TN	**L** 7–13	34–17	
May 9	at Tennessee*	Lower Hudson Field • Knoxville, TN	**W** 11–3	35–17	
May 10	at South Carolina*	Sarge Frye Field • Columbia, SC	**L** 1–6	35–18	
May 11	at South Carolina*	Sarge Frye Field • Columbia, SC	**L** 1–4	35–19	

NCAA Atlantic Regional
Date	Opponent	Site/stadium	Score	Overall record	Regional record
May 22	East Tennessee State	Beautiful Tiger Field • Clemson, SC	**W** 22–4	36–19	1–0
May 24	South Carolina	Beautiful Tiger Field • Clemson, SC	**W** 6–2	37–19	2–0
May 25	South Carolina	Beautiful Tiger Field • Clemson, SC	**W** 17–12	38–19	3–0

NCAA College World Series
Date	Opponent	Site/stadium	Score	Overall record	CWS record
May 31	Miami (FL)	Johnny Rosenblatt Stadium • Omaha, NE	**L** 5–13	38–20	0–1
June 1	California	Johnny Rosenblatt Stadium • Omaha, NE	**L** 4–6	38–21	0–2
