= Jeff Ledbetter =

American baseball player

Jeff Ledbetter (born December 25, 1959) is an American former baseball player who was named player of the year in college baseball by Baseball America and Sporting News in 1982. He played professionally in the minor leagues from 1982 to 1986.

== Early life and education ==
After being drafted by the New York Yankees in the 22nd round during the 1978 Major League Baseball draft out of Largo High School, Ledbetter planned to decline the offer and attend college.

In season records, Ledbetter had the most RBIs for Florida State with 95 in 1981 and 124 in 1982. He was also the college's 1982 batting average season leader with a .381 average. For almost 40 years, Ledbetter has held multiple career records for Florida State with 97 home runs, 346 RBIs, and 704 total bases. As an NCAA Division I college baseball player, Ledbetter led the 1982 season with 273 total bases. In home runs, LedBetter set records in 1982 with 42 season home runs and 97 career home runs.

He held both Division I home run records for three years until they were broken by Pete Incaviglia in 1985. Alternatively, Ledbetter continued to retain a three decade NCAA Division I career record in 2019 with 346 RBIs. In 1980, he played collegiate summer baseball with the Hyannis Mets of the Cape Cod Baseball League and was named a league all-star.

== Career ==
At the 1982 Major League Baseball draft, Ledbetter was drafted by the Boston Red Sox in the first round. He spent the 1982 season with the Winston-Salem Red Sox, where he struggled to start off his minor league career. In his first 50 games, he had a batting average of .207. By the end of the season, he had a .238 batting average and seven home runs in 62 games. The following season, Ledbetter played for the Winter Haven Red Sox, where he had a .274 batting average and nine home runs in 99 games.

In 1984, he spent the year with the New Britain Red Sox in the Double-A affiliate Eastern League, and hit .214 in 114 games. After the season ended, Ledbetter requested his release, which was granted, and signed with the St. Louis Cardinals organization. He split the season with the Arkansas Travelers and St. Petersburg Cardinals. His final professional baseball season was 1986, where he hit .180 in 27 games for Arkansas.

== Awards and honors ==
Sporting News selected Ledbetter as an All-American during 1981 He was named All-America by the American Baseball Coaches Association in 1982. During 1982, Ledbetter was named player of the year in college baseball by Baseball America and Sporting News. In 1991, Ledbetter was inducted into the Florida State University Hall of Fame.
