= 1980 Major League Baseball draft =

Baseball draft of amateur players

General information
- Date: June 1980

Overview
- 832 total selections
- First selection: Darryl Strawberry; New York Mets
- First round selections: 26

The 1980 Major League Baseball draft took place in June 1980. The draft saw the New York Mets select Darryl Strawberry first overall.

== First round selections ==
= All-Star	= Baseball Hall of Famer

The following are the first round picks in the 1980 Major League Baseball draft.

Pick	Player	Team	Position	Hometown/School
1	Darryl Strawberry	New York Mets	Outfield	Crenshaw High School
2	Garry Harris	Toronto Blue Jays	Shortstop	Hoover High School
3	Ken Dayley	Atlanta Braves	Pitcher	Portland
4	Mike King	Oakland Athletics	Pitcher	Morningside College
5	Jeff Pyburn	San Diego Padres	Outfield	Georgia
6	Darnell Coles	Seattle Mariners	Shortstop	Eisenhower High School
7	Jessie Reid	San Francisco Giants	First Base	Lynwood High School
8	Cecil Espy	Chicago White Sox	Outfield	Point Loma High School
9	Ross Jones	Los Angeles Dodgers	Shortstop	Miami (FL)
10	Kelly Gruber	Cleveland Indians	Shortstop	Westlake High School
11	Don Schulze	Chicago Cubs	Pitcher	Lake Park High School
12	Jeff Reed	Minnesota Twins	Catcher	Joliet West High School
13	Henry Powell	Philadelphia Phillies	Catcher	Pine Forest High School
14	Tim Maki	Texas Rangers	Pitcher	Carrol High School
15	Don Collins	St. Louis Cardinals	Pitcher	Ferguson High School
16	Frank Wills	Kansas City Royals	Pitcher	Tulane
17	Dennis Rasmussen	California Angels (Note: Pick from Houston Astros as compensation for signing of free agent Nolan Ryan)	Pitcher	Creighton
18	Glenn Wilson	Detroit Tigers	Third Baseman	Sam Houston State
19	Ron Robinson	Cincinnati Reds	Pitcher	Woodlake High School
20	Rich Renteria	Pittsburgh Pirates (Note: Pick from California Angels as compensation for signing of free agent Bruce Kison)	Shortstop	South Gate High School
21	Jim Acker	Atlanta Braves (Note: Pick from Montreal Expos as compensation for signing of free agent Rowland Office)	Pitcher	Texas
22	Terry Francona	Montreal Expos (Note: Pick from New York Yankees as compensation for signing of free agent Rudy May)	Outfield	Arizona
23	Billy Beane	New York Mets (Note: Pick from Pittsburgh Pirates as compensation for signing of free agent Andy Hassler)	Outfield	Mount Carmel High School (CA)
24	John Gibbons	New York Mets (Note: Pick from Boston Red Sox as compensation for signing of free agent Skip Lockwood)	Catcher	MacArthur High School
25	Dion James	Milwaukee Brewers	Outfield	McClatchy High School
26	Jeff Williams	Baltimore Orioles	Outfield	Princeton High School (OH)

== Other notable players ==
- Tim Teufel, 2nd round, 38th overall by the Minnesota Twins
- Dan Plesac, 2nd round, 41st overall by the St. Louis Cardinals (did not sign)
- Dave Miley, 2nd round, 47th overall by the Cincinnati Reds
- Tim Burke†, 2nd round, 49th overall by the Pittsburgh Pirates
- Joe Hesketh, 2nd round, 50th overall by the Montreal Expos
- Danny Tartabull†, 3rd round, 71st overall by the Cincinnati Reds
- Doug Drabek†, 4th round, 87th overall by the Cleveland Indians (did not sign)
- Ricky Horton, 4th round, 92nd overall by the St. Louis Cardinals
- Joe Orsulak, 6th round, 152nd overall by the Pittsburgh Pirates
- Randy Ready, 6th round, 154th overall by the Milwaukee Brewers
- Don Slaught, 7th round, 171st overall by the Kansas City Royals
- Lloyd McClendon, 8th round, 183rd overall by the New York Mets
- Eric Davis†, 8th round, 201st overall by the Cincinnati Reds
- John Farrell, 9th round, 212th overall by the Oakland Athletics (did not sign)
- Craig Lefferts, 9th round, 219th overall by the Chicago Cubs
- Dave Magadan, 12th round, 310th overall by the Boston Red Sox (did not sign)
- Ed Vande Berg, 13th round, 318th overall by the Seattle Mariners
- Terry Steinbach†, 16th round, 400th overall by the Cleveland Indians (did not sign)
- Jim Eisenreich, 16th round, 402nd overall by the Minnesota Twins
- Oil Can Boyd, 16th round, 414th overall by the Boston Red Sox
- Danny Jackson†, 24th round, 599th overall by the Oakland Athletics (did not sign)
- Darren Daulton†, 25th round, 629th overall by the Philadelphia Phillies
- Chris Sabo†, 30th round, 727th overall by the Montreal Expos (did not sign)
- Walt Terrell, 33rd round, 763rd overall by the Texas Rangers
- Rick Aguilera, 37th round, 803rd overall by the St. Louis Cardinals (did not sign)

† All-Star
‡ Hall of Famer

=== Football players drafted ===
- Turner Gill, 2nd round, 36th overall by the Chicago White Sox (did not sign)
- Kevin House, 19th round, 475th overall by the Chicago White Sox (did not sign)

Preceded by Al Chambers	1st Overall Picks; Darryl Strawberry	Succeeded by Mike Moore
