= 1980 Hawaii Rainbow Warriors baseball team =

American college baseball season

1980 Hawaii Rainbow Warriors baseball

WAC Regular season champions WAC Championship Series winners

College World Series, Runners-up
- Conference: Western Athletic Conference
- Record: 60–18 (19–5 WAC)
- Head coach: Les Murakami (10th year)
- Assistant coaches: Coop DeRenne; Jim Fujimori; Dave Murakami; Carl Furutani; Ron Nomura
- Home stadium: UH Stadium

1980 Western Athletic Conference baseball standings
	Conf.				Overall
Team	W		L	PCT	W		L	PCT
North
BYU ^{x}‍‍‍^{y}	14	–	3	.824	41	–	18	.695
Wyoming ‍‍‍	11	–	6	.647	23	–	20	.535
Utah ‍‍‍	5	–	12	.294	17	–	19	.472
Colorado State ‍‍‍	4	–	13	.235	17	–	37	.315
South
No. 2 Hawaii ^{x}‍‍‡‍^{y}	19	–	5	.792	60	–	18	.769
New Mexico ‍‍‍	16	–	8	.667	43	–	20	.683
San Diego State ‍‍‍	11	–	12	.478	40	–	26	.606
UTEP ‍‍‍	1	–	22	.043	22	–	39	.361
x – Division champion ‡ – Championship Series champion y – Invited to the NCAA tournament As of 18 November 2016; Rankings from Collegiate Baseball

The 1980 Hawaii Rainbow Warriors baseball team represented the University of Hawaii at Manoa during the 1980 NCAA Division I baseball season. It was the program's 58th season of existence, and its first season in the Western Athletic Conference. In the Warriors' first season in the WAC, they won divisional and conference honors, winning the South Division regular season, and the WAC Championship Series against BYU. The Rainbow Warriors received an automatic berth into the 1980 NCAA Division I baseball tournament. There, they won the Central Regional and advanced to the College World Series, where they lost in the final to Arizona.

== Background ==
The 1979 season saw the Rainbow Warriors finish with an overall record of 69–15, including notable wins over Vanderbilt, North Carolina, and Oregon State. Their record provided the Warriors with an at-large berth into the 1979 NCAA Division I baseball tournament. The Warriors lost in the midwest regional final to Arizona.

== Roster ==
1980 Hawaii Rainbow Warriors roster
Pitchers: Chuck Crim; Bryan Duquette; Sam Kakazu; Wes Kimura; Alan Lane; Mark Olmos; Scott Roberts; Glenn Silva; David Smith	Infielders: Howard Dashefsky; Wade Mauricio; Larry O'Connor; Kimo Perkins; Thad Reece; Eric Tokunaga; Utility: Joel Lono'; Greg Oniate; Gordon Muramaru	Catchers: Collin Tanabe; Outfielders: Rick Bass; Jay Erdahl; Les Kakazu; Kevin Williams

== Schedule ==
Legend
Hawaii win
Hawaii loss
Postponement/cancellation

1980 Hawaii Rainbow Warriors baseball game log
Regular season
February

Date	Opponent	Site/stadium	Score	Overall record	WAC record
February 1	at Hawaii–Hilo	Francis Wong Stadium • Hilo, HI	W 6–2	1–0	—
February 1	at Hawaii–Hilo	Francis Wong Stadium • Hilo, HI	W 8–5	2–0	—
February 2	at Hawaii–Hilo	Francis Wong Stadium • Hilo, HI	W 15–1	3–0	—
February 3	Hawaii–Hilo	UH Stadium • Honolulu, HI	W 9–0	4–0	—
February 3	Hawaii–Hilo	UH Stadium • Honolulu, HI	W 7–3	5–0	—
February 9	Hawaii–Hilo	UH Stadium • Honolulu, HI	W 10–3	6–0	—
February 10	Hawaii–Hilo	UH Stadium • Honolulu, HI	W 7–1	7–0	—
February 10	Hawaii–Hilo	UH Stadium • Honolulu, HI	W 13–2	8–0	—
February 15	Arizona State	UH Stadium • Honolulu, HI	L 11–13	8–1	—
February 15	Arizona State	UH Stadium • Honolulu, HI	W 8–7	9–1	—
February 16	Arizona State	UH Stadium • Honolulu, HI	W 8–6	10–1	—
February 16	Arizona State	UH Stadium • Honolulu, HI	W 13–2	11–1	—
February 17	Arizona State	UH Stadium • Honolulu, HI	L 11–13	11–2	—
February 17	Arizona State	UH Stadium • Honolulu, HI	W 4–2	12–2	—
February 29	Oklahoma	UH Stadium • Honolulu, HI	W 3–2	13–2	—

March

Date	Opponent	Site/stadium	Score	Overall record	WAC record
March 1	Oklahoma	UH Stadium • Honolulu, HI	L 1–2	13–3	—
March 1	Oklahoma	UH Stadium • Honolulu, HI	W 11–1	14–3	—
March 2	Oklahoma	UH Stadium • Honolulu, HI	L 0–1	14–4	—
March 2	Oklahoma	UH Stadium • Honolulu, HI	W 8–7	15–4	—
March 3	Oklahoma	UH Stadium • Honolulu, HI	L 5–6	15–5	—
March 7	Murray State	UH Stadium • Honolulu, HI	W 7–6	16–5	—
March 7	Murray State	UH Stadium • Honolulu, HI	W 16–7	17–5	—
March 8	Murray State	UH Stadium • Honolulu, HI	W 6–0	18–5	—
March 8	Murray State	UH Stadium • Honolulu, HI	W 12–6	19–5	—
March 9	Murray State	UH Stadium • Honolulu, HI	W 7–3	20–5	—
March 10	Wichita State	UH Stadium • Honolulu, HI	L 2–6	20–6	—
March 12	Wichita State	UH Stadium • Honolulu, HI	L 1–6	20–7	—
March 12	Wichita State	UH Stadium • Honolulu, HI	L 8–9	20–8	—
March 13	Wichita State	UH Stadium • Honolulu, HI	W 7–3	21–8	—
March 18	Kearney State	UH Stadium • Honolulu, HI	W 9–0	22–8	—
March 18	Kearney State	UH Stadium • Honolulu, HI	W 11–0	23–8	—
March 21	Cal State Los Angeles	UH Stadium • Honolulu, HI	W 6–1	24–8	—
March 22	Cal State Los Angeles	UH Stadium • Honolulu, HI	W 8–3	25–8	—
March 24	Missouri	UH Stadium • Honolulu, HI	W 6–2	26–8	—
March 25	Chuo	UH Stadium • Honolulu, HI	W 5–3	27–8	—
March 26	Cal Poly Pomona	UH Stadium • Honolulu, HI	W 10–7	28–8	—
March 27	Cal Poly Pomona	UH Stadium • Honolulu, HI	W 6–0	29–8	—
March 27	Chuo	UH Stadium • Honolulu, HI	W 14–5	30–8	—
March 28	Missouri	UH Stadium • Honolulu, HI	L 2–10	30–9	—

April

Date	Opponent	Site/stadium	Score	Overall record	WAC record
April 4	at UTEP	Dudley Field • El Paso, TX	W 15–8	31–9	1–0
April 4	at UTEP	Dudley Field • El Paso, TX	W 10–6	32–9	2–0
April 5	at UTEP	Dudley Field • El Paso, TX	W 12–8	33–9	3–0
April 5	at UTEP	Dudley Field • El Paso, TX	W 12–4	34–9	4–0
April 7	at Wichita State	Shocker Field • Wichita, KS	W 9–1	35–9	—
April 8	at Wichita State	Shocker Field • Wichita, KS	W 12–6	36–9	—
April 10	at New Mexico	UNM Ballpark • Albuquerque, NM	W 6–1	37–9	5–0
April 10	at New Mexico	UNM Ballpark • Albuquerque, NM	W 13–11	38–9	6–0
April 11	at New Mexico	UNM Ballpark • Albuquerque, NM	L 0–14	38–10	6–1
April 11	at New Mexico	UNM Ballpark • Albuquerque, NM	L 6–11	38–11	6–2
April 17	San Diego State	UH Stadium • Honolulu, HI	W 7–4	39–11	7–2
April 18	San Diego State	UH Stadium • Honolulu, HI	W 11–4	40–11	8–2
April 19	San Diego State	UH Stadium • Honolulu, HI	W 6–5	41–11	9–2
April 19	San Diego State	UH Stadium • Honolulu, HI	W 7–4	42–11	10–2
April 20	San Diego State	UH Stadium • Honolulu, HI	L 4–9	42–12	10–3
April 24	UTEP	UH Stadium • Honolulu, HI	W 9–4	43–12	11–3
April 25	UTEP	UH Stadium • Honolulu, HI	W 10–2	44–12	12–3
April 25	UTEP	UH Stadium • Honolulu, HI	W 7–1	45–12	13–3
April 26	UTEP	UH Stadium • Honolulu, HI	W 9–0	46–12	14–3
April 26	UTEP	UH Stadium • Honolulu, HI	W 7–6	47–12	15–3
April 27	UTEP	UH Stadium • Honolulu, HI	L 1–10	47–13	15–4

May

Date	Opponent	Site/stadium	Score	Overall record	WAC record
May 2	at San Diego State	SDSU Ballpark • San Diego, CA	W 7–1	48–13	16–4
May 2	at San Diego State	SDSU Ballpark • San Diego, CA	L 2–3	48–14	16–5
May 3	at San Diego State	SDSU Ballpark • San Diego, CA	L 5–8	48–15	—
May 3	at San Diego State	SDSU Ballpark • San Diego, CA	W 9–3	49–15	—
May 7	New Mexico	UH Stadium • Honolulu, HI	W 8–7	50–15	—
May 8	New Mexico	UH Stadium • Honolulu, HI	L 1–4	50–16	—
May 8	New Mexico	UH Stadium • Honolulu, HI	W 11–10	51–16	—
May 9	New Mexico	UH Stadium • Honolulu, HI	W 9–0	52–17	17–5
May 9	New Mexico	UH Stadium • Honolulu, HI	W 4–3	53–17	18–5
May 10	New Mexico	UH Stadium • Honolulu, HI	W 4–2	54–17	19–5

Postseason
WAC Championship Series

Date	Opponent	Site/stadium	Score	Overall record	Potseason Record
May 16	BYU	UH Stadium • Honolulu, HI	W 9–2	55–17	1–0
May 17	BYU	UH Stadium • Honolulu, HI	W 7–0	56–17	2–0

NCAA Central Regional

Date	Opponent	Site/stadium	Score	Overall record	Postseason record
May 23	vs. Texas–Pan American	Disch–Falk Field • Austin, TX	W 8–4	57–17	3–0
May 24	vs. Louisiana Tech	Disch–Falk Field • Austin, TX	W 2–1	58–17	4–0
May 25	at Texas	Disch–Falk Field • Austin, TX	W 7–3	59–17	5–0

College World Series

Date	Opponent	Site/stadium	Score	Overall record	Postseason record
May 30	vs. Florida State	Johnny Rosenblatt Stadium • Omaha, NE	W 7–6	60–17	6–0
June 1	vs. St. John's	Johnny Rosenblatt Stadium • Omaha, NE	W 7–6	61–17	7–0
June 3	vs. Miami	Johnny Rosenblatt Stadium • Omaha, NE	W 9–3	62–17	8–0
June 4	vs. Arizona	Johnny Rosenblatt Stadium • Omaha, NE	L 4–5	62–18	8–1
June 5	vs. Arizona	Johnny Rosenblatt Stadium • Omaha, NE	L 3–5	62–19	8–2

== Warriors in the 1980 MLB draft ==
The following members of the Hawaii Rainbow Warriors baseball program were drafted in the 1980 Major League Baseball draft.

Player	Position	Round	Overall	MLB team
Derek Tatsuno	RHP	2nd	29th	New York Mets
Kevin Williams	OF	11th	272nd	Minnesota Twins
Rick Bass	OF	17th	441st	Milwaukee Brewers
