= 1980 NCAA Division I baseball rankings =

1980 NCAA Division I baseball season

Tournament

College World Series
- Champions: Arizona
- Runners-up: Hawaii
- MOP: Terry Francona (Arizona)

Seasons
- ← 1979 1981 →

The following poll makes up the 1980 NCAA Division I baseball rankings. Collegiate Baseball Newspaper published its first human poll of the top 20 teams in college baseball in 1957, and expanded to rank the top 30 teams in 1961.

== Collegiate Baseball ==
Currently, only the final poll from the 1980 season is available.

Rank	Team
1	Arizona
2	Hawaii
3	California
4	Miami (FL)
5	St. John's
6	Michigan
7	Florida State
8	Clemson
9	South Carolina
10	Gonzaga
11	Texas
12	UNLV
13	Missouri
14	Nebraska
15	Louisiana Tech
16	Oklahoma State
17	Delaware
18	Western Kentucky
19	Arkansas
20	Oral Roberts
21	Texas–Pan American
22	East Tennessee State
23	Cal State Fullerton
24	Fresno State
25	Wichita State
26	Harvard
27	New Orleans
28	Texas A&M
29	BYU
30	Portland
