= Ross Jones (baseball) =

American baseball player (born 1960)

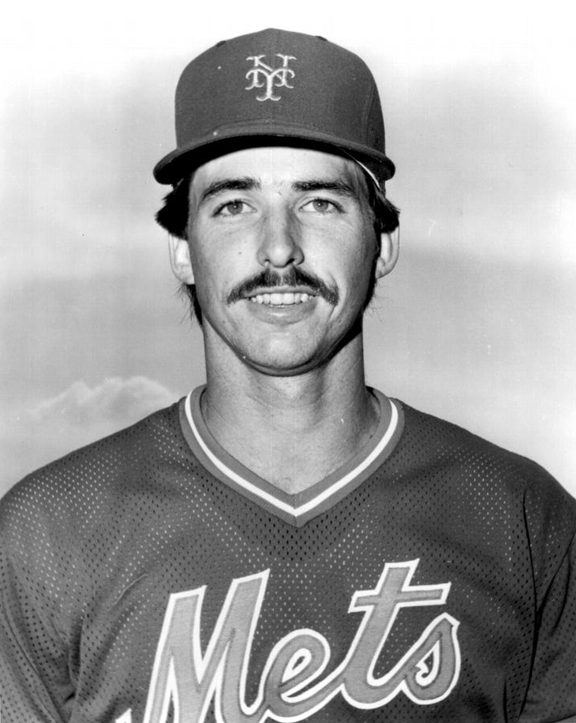
- Shortstop
- Born: January 14, 1960 (age 66); Miami, Florida, U.S.
- Batted: Right Threw: Right

MLB debut
- April 2, 1984, for the New York Mets

Last MLB appearance
- October 4, 1987, for the Kansas City Royals

MLB statistics
- Batting average: .221
- Hits: 32
- Runs batted in: 11
- Stats at Baseball Reference

Teams
- New York Mets (1984); Seattle Mariners (1986); Kansas City Royals (1987)

Ross A. Jones (born January 14, 1960) is an American former professional baseball shortstop. He played for the New York Mets, Seattle Mariners, and Kansas City Royals of Major League Baseball (MLB).

== Amateur career ==
A native of Miami, Florida, Jones attended Hialeah High School and played college baseball at the University of Miami. In 1979, Jones played collegiate summer baseball for the Hyannis Mets of the Cape Cod Baseball League (CCBL). Batting .413, he was named the league's outstanding pro prospect, and led the Mets to the league title. Jones was inducted into the CCBL Hall of Fame in 2006.

== Professional career ==
Jones was drafted by the Los Angeles Dodgers ninth overall in the 1980 MLB draft. After four seasons in the Dodgers' farm system, Jones was traded with Sid Fernandez to the New York Mets for Bob Bailor and Carlos Diaz. He made the team out of spring training 1984, but saw only limited action behind Jose Oquendo and Ron Gardenhire at short, and was used primarily as a pinch hitter or pinch runner. In thirteen plate appearances, he had a double and three walks. The double was a game winning walk-off hit against Al Holland and the Philadelphia Phillies on April 28. On May 13, in one of his few appearances on the field with the Mets, Jones committed an error that led to three unearned runs in the Mets 5-3 loss to the Dodgers. He was reassigned to their triple A affiliate, the Tidewater Tides shortly afterwards, and briefly reappeared with the Mets following the All-Star break. Jones split 1985 between Tidewater and the double A Jackson Mets, and batted only .192 combined.

Following the 1985 season, he was released, and signed with the Seattle Mariners. Jones played at three levels for the Mariners in 1986, one of which was the major leagues. Despite batting .290 in the minors, with Seattle, he had only one hit in 21 at-bats for a .095 batting average.

Batting .319 with the Pacific Coast League's Calgary Cannons in 1987, Jones was traded to the Kansas City Royals for a player to be named later. He continued to hit well for the Omaha Royals, and earned a promotion to Kansas City. In 39 games, Jones batted .254, and had ten of his eleven career RBIs.

Following the season, Jones signed with the Oakland Athletics, but after committing four errors in three games with the triple A Tacoma Tigers, and getting only two hits in eighteen at bats, he was released. He signed with the New York Yankees shortly afterwards, spending the rest of the 1988 season with their triple A affiliate, the Columbus Clippers, before retiring.
