= Mike Fuentes (baseball) =

American baseball player (born 1958)

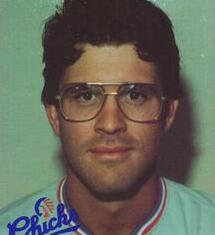
- Fuentes with the Memphis Chicks c. 1987
- Left fielder
- Born: July 11, 1958 (age 68); Miami, Florida, U.S.
- Batted: Right Threw: Right

MLB debut
- September 2, 1983, for the Montreal Expos

Last MLB appearance
- September 21, 1984, for the Montreal Expos

MLB statistics
- Batting average: .250
- Home runs: 0
- Runs batted in: 0
- Stats at Baseball Reference

Teams
- Montreal Expos (1983–1984)

Career highlights and awards
- Golden Spikes Award (1981)

Michael Jay Fuentes (born July 11, 1958) is an American former Major League Baseball player. He attended Florida State University, where he won the Golden Spikes Award in 1981.

The Montreal Expos selected Fuentes in the second round of the 1981 Major League Baseball draft. Fuentes was 25 years old when he broke into the big leagues on September 2, 1983, with the Expos. He played his only nine games in the majors that month, eight as a pinch hitter or pinch runner and one in left field. He went 2-for-8 at the plate, with no extra base hits or RBI.

In 1995, Fuentes was a replacement player in spring training for the Florida Marlins during the ongoing strike.

Fuentes was elected to the College Baseball Hall of Fame in 2023.
