= 1980 NCAA Division I baseball tournament =

American college sports championship

- Season: 1980
- Teams: 34
- Finals site: Johnny Rosenblatt Stadium; Omaha, Nebraska
- Champions: Arizona (2nd title)
- Runner-up: Hawaii (1st CWS Appearance)
- Winning coach: Jerry Kindall (2nd title)
- MOP: Terry Francona (Arizona)

The 1980 NCAA Division I baseball tournament was played at the end of the 1980 NCAA Division I baseball season to determine the national champion of college baseball. The tournament concluded with eight teams competing in the College World Series, a double-elimination tournament in its thirty fourth year. Eight regional competitions were held to determine the participants in the final event. Seven regions held a four team, double-elimination tournament while one region included six teams, resulting in 34 teams participating in the tournament at the conclusion of their regular season, and in some cases, after a conference tournament. The thirty-fourth tournament's champion was Arizona, coached by Jerry Kindall. The Most Outstanding Player was Terry Francona of the Arizona.

== Regionals ==
Seven of the eight regionals were played as 4-team double-elimination tournaments. One regional was played as a 6-team double-elimination tournament. The winner of each regional moved onto the College World Series.

=== Northeast Regional ===
Games played in Orono, Maine.

First Round
Harvard	7
East Carolina	3
St. John's	6
Maine	4
Lower round 1
East Carolina	1
Maine	2

Semi-Finals
Harvard	5
St. John's	9
Lower final
Harvard	7
Maine	5

Finals
St. John's	6	—
Harvard	3	—

=== West Regional ===
Games played in Tucson, Arizona.

First Round
Gonzaga	3
Cal State Fullerton	2
Arizona	5
Fresno State	4
Lower round 1
Cal State Fullerton	10
Fresno State	2

Semi-Finals
Gonzaga	9
Arizona	13
Lower final
Cal State Fullerton	8
Gonzaga	10^{11}

Finals
Arizona	8	—
Gonzaga	5	—

=== South Regional ===
Games played in Tallahassee, Florida.

First Round
Florida State	10
New Orleans	0
Western Kentucky	15
Vanderbilt	4
Lower round 1
New Orleans	8
Vanderbilt	2

Semi-Finals
Florida State	19
Western Kentucky	7
Lower final
Western Kentucky	4
New Orleans	3

Finals
Florida State	10	—
Western Kentucky	5	—

=== Central Regional ===
Games played in Austin, Texas.

First Round
Hawaii	8
Texas–Pan American	4
Louisiana Tech	4
Texas	3
Lower round 1
Texas–Pan American	4
Texas	7

Semi-Finals
Hawaii	2
Louisiana Tech	1
Lower final
Louisiana Tech	6
Texas	7

Finals
Hawaii	7	—
Texas	3	—

=== Atlantic Regional ===
Games played in Clemson, South Carolina.

First Round
South Carolina	7
Georgia Southern	2
Clemson	22
East Tennessee State	4
Lower round 1
Georgia Southern	1
East Tennessee State	2

Semi-Finals
South Carolina	2
Clemson	6
Lower final
South Carolina	8
East Tennessee State	5

Finals
Clemson	17	—
South Carolina	12	—

=== East Regional ===
Games played in Miami, Florida.

First Round
James Madison	11
Delaware	10
Miami (FL)	15
South Alabama	6
Lower round 1
Delaware	5^{10}
South Alabama	4

Semi-Finals
James Madison	3
Miami (FL)	10
Lower final
James Madison	1
Delaware	6

Finals
Miami (FL)	10	—
Delaware	1	—

=== Mideast Regional ===
Games played in Ann Arbor, Michigan.

First Round
Michigan	9
Central Michigan	4
Nebraska	12
BYU	0
Lower round 1
Central Michigan	0
BYU	9

Semi-Finals
Michigan	7
Nebraska	0
Lower final
Nebraska	12
BYU	4

Finals
Michigan	12	—
Nebraska	3	—

=== Midwest Regional ===
Games played in Tulsa, Oklahoma.

First Round
1	UNLV	3
6	California	2
2	Missouri	5
5	Wichita State	4
3	Arkansas	3
4	Oral Roberts	2

Second Round
UNLV	4
Oral Roberts	0
Missouri	6
Arkansas	0
California	5
Wichita State	1

Third Round
UNLV	10
Missouri	2
Arkansas	1
California	7

Semi-Finals
Missouri	1
California	2^{14}

Finals
UNLV	2	0
California	6	12

== College World Series ==
=== Participants ===
School	Conference	Record (conference)	Head coach	CWS appearances	CWS best finish	CWS record
Arizona	Pac-10	40–20–1 (17–13)	Jerry Kindall	11 (last: 1979)	1st (1976)	22–21
California	Pac-10	41–21–1 (17–13)	Bob Milano	2 (last: 1957)	1st (1947, 1957)	7–0
Clemson	ACC	38–19 (6–5)	Bill Wilhelm	4 (last: 1977)	5th (1958, 1959, 1976)	4–8
Florida State	Metro	51–10 (n/a)	Mike Martin	6 (last: 1975)	2nd (1970)	8–12
Hawaii	WAC	57–16 (19–5)	Les Murakami	0 (last: none)	none	0–0
Miami (FL)	n/a	57–10 (n/a)	Ron Fraser	3 (last: 1979)	2nd (1974)	5–6
Michigan	Big 10	35–16–1 (14–2)	Bud Middaugh	3 (last: 1978)	1st (1953)	9–3
St. John's	Eastern Collegiate	29–9 (n/a)	Joe Russo	5 (last: 1978)	4th (1949, 1966, 1968)	5–10

=== Results ===
==== Bracket ====
Upper round 1
St. John's	6
Arizona	1
Hawaii	7
Florida State	6
Miami (FL)	13
Clemson	5
Michigan	9^{11}
California	8

Upper round 2
St. John's	2
Hawaii	7
Miami (FL)	3
Michigan	2
Lower round 1
Arizona	5
Florida State	3
Clemson	4
California	6

Upper final
Hawaii	9
Miami (FL)	3
Lower round 2
Michigan	0
Arizona	8
St. John's	5
California	8

Semifinals
Hawaii	4
Arizona	6^{11}
Miami (FL)	3
California	4

Preliminary final
Arizona	10
California	9

Final
Hawaii	3
Arizona	5

==== Game results ====
Date	Game	Winner	Score	Loser	Notes
May 30	Game 1	St. John's	6–1	Arizona	
May 30	Game 2	Hawaii	7–6	Florida State	
May 31	Game 3	Miami (FL)	13–5	Clemson	
May 31	Game 4	Michigan	9–8 (11 innings)	California	
June 1	Game 5	Arizona	5–3	Florida State	Florida State eliminated
June 1	Game 6	California	6–4	Clemson	Clemson eliminated
June 1	Game 7	Hawaii	7–2	St. John's	
June 2	Game 8	Miami (FL)	3–2	Michigan	
June 2	Game 9	California	8–5	St. John's	St. John's eliminated
June 2	Game 10	Arizona	8–0	Michigan	Michigan eliminated
June 3	Game 11	Hawaii	9–3	Miami (FL)	
June 4	Game 12	California	4–3	Miami (FL)	Miami (FL) eliminated
June 4	Game 13	Arizona	6–4 (11 innings)	Hawaii	
June 5	Game 14	Arizona	10-9	California	California eliminated
June 6	Final	Arizona	5–3	Hawaii	Arizona wins CWS

=== All-Tournament Team ===
The following players were members of the All-Tournament Team.

Position	Player	School
P	Greg Barger	Arizona
P	Craig Lefferts	Arizona
C	Collin Tanabe	Hawaii
1B	Wes Clements	Arizona
2B	Paul Hundhammer	Miami (FL)
3B	Kimo Perkins	Hawaii
SS	Eric Tokunaga	Hawaii
OF	Terry Francona (MOP)	Arizona
OF	Lyle Brackenridge	California
OF	Jim Paciorek	Michigan
DH	Paul Maruffi	St. John's

=== Notable players ===
- Arizona: Greg Bargar, Casey Candaele, Terry Francona, Craig Lefferts, John Moses, Dwight Taylor, Ed Vosberg, Kevin Ward
- California: Chuck Cary, Rod Booker, Chuck Hensley, Bob Melvin
- Clemson: Mike Brown, Jimmy Key, Danny Sheaffer, Tim Teufel
- Florida State: Mike Fuentes, Jim Weaver
- Hawaii: Chuck Crim
- Miami (FL): Neal Heaton, Ross Jones, Mike Pagliarulo
- Michigan: Steve Ontiveros, Jim Paciorek
- St. John's: John Franco, Frank Viola

== See also ==
- 1980 NCAA Division II baseball tournament
- 1980 NCAA Division III baseball tournament
- 1980 NAIA World Series
