= List of Clemson Tigers baseball seasons =

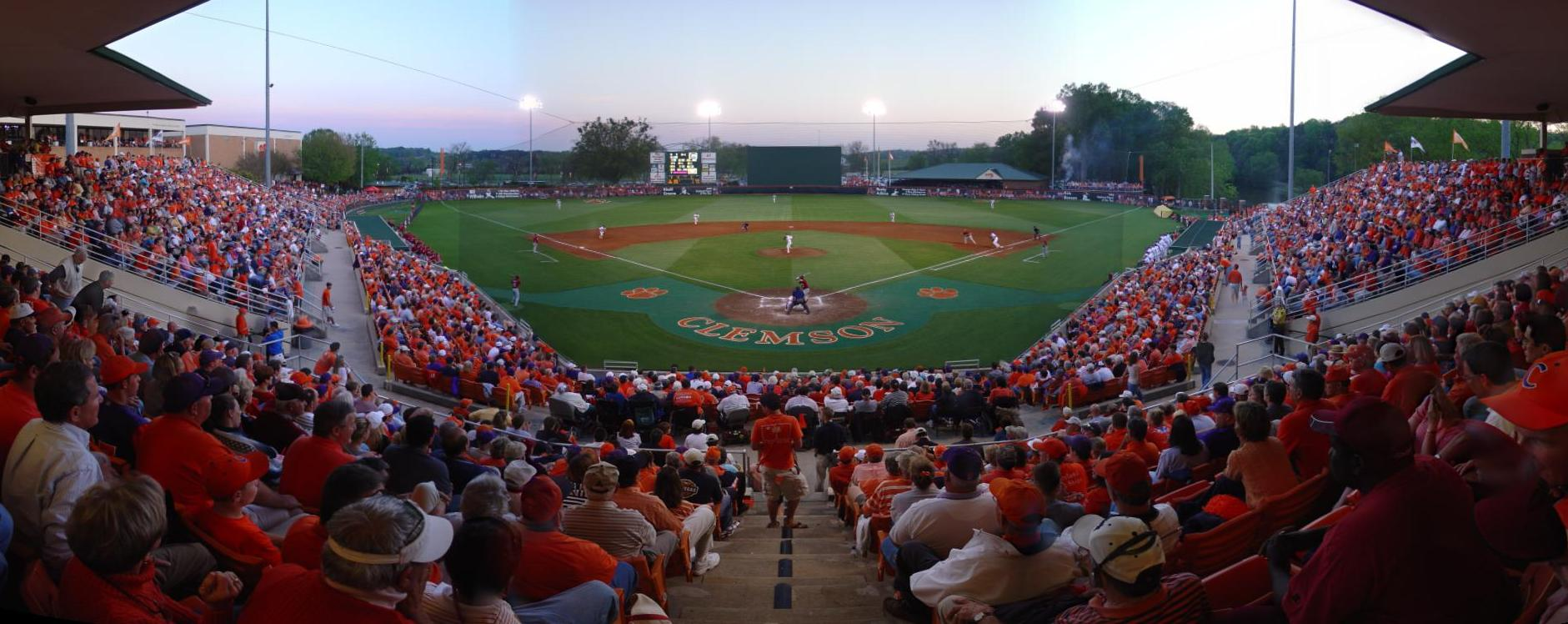
Doug Kingsmore Stadium

This is a list of Clemson Tigers baseball seasons. The Clemson Tigers baseball program is a college baseball team that represents Clemson University in the Atlantic Division of the Atlantic Coast Conference in the National Collegiate Athletic Association. Clemson has played their home games at Doug Kingsmore Stadium in Clemson, South Carolina since 1970.

The Tigers have won 15 conference championships, and have played in the NCAA Division I Baseball Championship 36 times, advancing to the College World Series on 12 occasions. With 2,566 wins over 114 seasons of baseball, Clemson ranks 17th all-time in win–loss records and 8th in victories in the NCAA.

== Season results ==
National champions	College World Series berth	NCAA tournament berth	Conference Tournament champions	Conference/Division Regular season Champions

Season	Head coach	Conference (Note: Clemson was a member of the Southern Intercollegiate Athletic Association from 1900 until 1923, but the conference did not sponsor baseball. The Southern Conference, of which Clemson was a member from 1924 until 1953, did not sponsor baseball until 1947. Since 1954, Clemson has been a member of the Atlantic Coast Conference.)	Season results									Tournament results		Final poll (Note: Collegiate Baseball began team rankings in 1959. Baseball America began during the 1981 season. The Coaches' Poll (published by USA Today's Sports Weekly and ESPN) began publishing its rankings during the 1992 season.)		
Season	Head coach	Conference	Overall				Conference					Conference (Note: The Southern Conference held a tournament from 1950 until 1953. The Atlantic Coast Conference began a baseball tournament in 1974. The tournament was not held in 1979.)	Postseason (Note: Postseason play involving the NCAA Division I Baseball Championship began in 1947.)	BA	CB (Note: The Collegiate Baseball Newspaper ceased operations in November 2023. In years 2024 and onward, the final D1Baseball poll ranking is shown.)	Coaches
Season	Head coach	Conference	Wins	Losses	Ties	%	Wins	Losses	Ties	%	Finish (Note: The Atlantic Coast Conference split into two divisions in 2006. Since then, regular season conference championships are no longer awarded.)	Conference	Postseason	BA	CB	Coaches
Clemson Tigers
1896	R. T. V. Bowman	Independent	0	2	0	.000	—	—	—	—	—	—	—	—	—	—
1897	No team															
1898	R. T. V. Bowman	Independent	2	4	0	.333	—	—	—	—	—	—	—	—	—	—
1899	Unknown	Independent	4	3	0	.571	—	—	—	—	—	—	—	—	—	—
1900	Unknown	Independent	8	2	0	.800	—	—	—	—	—	—	—	—	—	—
1901	John Heisman	Independent	10	2	1	.808	—	—	—	—	—	—	—	—	—	—
1902	John Heisman	Independent	9	3	0	.750	—	—	—	—	—	—	—	—	—	—
1903	John Heisman	Independent	9	1	0	.900	4	0	0	1.000	1st	—	—	—	—	—
1904	John McMakin	Independent	8	5	1	.607	—	—	—	—	—	—	—	—	—	—
1905	John McMakin	Independent	6	8	1	.433	—	—	—	—	—	—	—	—	—	—
1906	John McMakin	Independent	6	10	1	.382	—	—	—	—	—	—	—	—	—	—
1907	Frank Shaughnessy	Independent	9	7	1	.559	—	—	—	—	—	—	—	—	—	—
1908	Robert Lynch	Independent	6	11	0	.353	—	—	—	—	—	—	—	—	—	—
1909	Jesse Reynolds	Independent	10	12	0	.455	—	—	—	—	—	—	—	—	—	—
1910	Joe Holland	Independent	10	11	0	.476	—	—	—	—	—	—	—	—	—	—
1911	Frank Dobson	Independent	13	10	0	.565	—	—	—	—	—	—	—	—	—	—
1912	Frank Dobson	Independent	11	6	0	.647	—	—	—	—	—	—	—	—	—	—
1913	Frank Dobson	Independent	13	5	0	.722	—	—	—	—	—	—	—	—	—	—
1914	Thomas Robertson	Independent	16	6	0	.727	—	—	—	—	—	—	—	—	—	—
1915	Vet Sitton	Independent	13	7	0	.650	—	—	—	—	—	—	—	—	—	—
1916	Vet Sitton	Independent	13	11	1	.540	—	—	—	—	—	—	—	—	—	—
1917	Country Morris	Independent	13	13	0	.500	—	—	—	—	—	—	—	—	—	—
1918	Edward Donahue	Independent	11	6	0	.647	—	—	—	—	—	—	—	—	—	—
1919	Edward Donahue	Independent	6	15	1	.295	—	—	—	—	—	—	—	—	—	—
1920	Country Morris	Independent	4	15	0	.210	—	—	—	—	—	—	—	—	—	—
1921	Larry Conover	Independent	5	14	0	.263	—	—	—	—	—	—	—	—	—	—
1922	L. V. H. Durfee	Independent	10	8	0	.556	—	—	—	—	—	—	—	—	—	—
1923	L. V. H. Durfee	Independent	13	8	1	.614	—	—	—	—	—	—	—	—	—	—
1924	L. V. H. Durfee	Independent	6	10	0	.375	—	—	—	—	—	—	—	—	—	—
1925	Thomas May	Independent	11	14	0	.440	—	—	—	—	—	—	—	—	—	—
1926	Cul Richards	Independent	8	11	0	.420	—	—	—	—	—	—	—	—	—	—
1927	Tink Gillam	Independent	11	13	1	.460	—	—	—	—	—	—	—	—	—	—
1928	Joe Guyon	Independent	12	9	2	.565	—	—	—	—	—	—	—	—	—	—
1929	Joe Guyon	Independent	15	11	1	.574	—	—	—	—	—	—	—	—	—	—
1930	Joe Guyon	Independent	9	14	0	.391	—	—	—	—	—	—	—	—	—	—
1931	Joe Guyon	Independent	6	2	0	.750	—	—	—	—	—	—	—	—	—	—
1932	Jess Neely	Independent	14	6	0	.700	—	—	—	—	—	—	—	—	—	—
1933	Jess Neely	Independent	10	10	0	.500	—	—	—	—	—	—	—	—	—	—
1934	Jess Neely	Independent	8	8	1	.500	—	—	—	—	—	—	—	—	—	—
1935	Jess Neely	Independent	16	7	1	.688	—	—	—	—	—	—	—	—	—	—
1936	Jess Neely	Independent	6	11	0	.353	—	—	—	—	—	—	—	—	—	—
1937	Jess Neely	Independent	7	12	0	.368	—	—	—	—	—	—	—	—	—	—
1938	Jess Neely	Independent	6	12	0	.333	—	—	—	—	—	—	—	—	—	—
1939	Randy Hinson	Independent	10	7	0	.588	—	—	—	—	—	—	—	—	—	—
1940	Randy Hinson	Independent	12	2	2	.813	—	—	—	—	—	—	—	—	—	—
1941	Tom Rogers	Independent	10	6	0	.625	—	—	—	—	—	—	—	—	—	—
1942	Tom Rogers	Independent	8	8	0	.500	—	—	—	—	—	—	—	—	—	—
1943	Frank Howard	Independent	12	3	0	.800	—	—	—	—	—	—	—	—	—	—
1944	No team	Independent														
1945	Walter Cox	Independent	7	6	0	.538	—	—	—	—	—	—	—	—	—	—
1946	Randy Hinson	Independent	12	5	0	.706	—	—	—	—	—	—	—	—	—	—
1947	Randy Hinson	Southern Conference	24	5	0	.828	13	2	0	.867	1st	—	Eastern Playoff	—	—	—
1948	Walter Cox	Southern Conference	14	12	1	.537	8	8	1	.500	8th	—	DNP	—	—	—
1949	Walter Cox	Southern Conference	11	12	0	.478	10	5	0	.667	4th	—	DNP	—	—	—
1950	Walter Cox	Southern Conference	20	11	0	.625	13	3	0	.813	2nd (South)	Semifinal	District Regional	—	—	—
1951	Walter Cox	Southern Conference	18	7	0	.720	16	2	0	.889	1st	2nd	DNP	—	—	—
1952	Bob Smith	Southern Conference	10	12	0	.455	10	10	0	.500	5th (South)	DNP	DNP	—	—	—
1953	Bob Smith	Southern Conference	11	6	0	.647	11	6	0	.647	3rd (South)	DNP	DNP	—	—	—
1954	Bob Smith	Atlantic Coast Conference	14	10	0	.583	8	4	0	.667	1st	—	DNP	—	—	—
1955	Bob Smith	Atlantic Coast Conference	7	11	0	.389	5	9	0	.357	7th	—	DNP	—	—	—
1956	Bob Smith	Atlantic Coast Conference	4	14	2	.250	2	10	2	.214	7th	—	DNP	—	—	—
1957	Bob Smith	Atlantic Coast Conference	6	12	0	.333	3	11	0	.214	8th	—	DNP	—	—	—
1958	Bill Wilhelm	Atlantic Coast Conference	22	8	0	.733	11	3	0	.786	1st	—	College World Series	—	—	—
1959	Bill Wilhelm	Atlantic Coast Conference	24	8	0	.750	9	5	0	.643	1st	—	College World Series	—	5	—
1960	Bill Wilhelm	Atlantic Coast Conference	11	10	1	.523	7	6	0	.538	4th	—	DNP	—	NR	—
1961	Bill Wilhelm	Atlantic Coast Conference	12	11	0	.522	6	8	0	.429	5th	—	DNP	—	NR	—
1962	Bill Wilhelm	Atlantic Coast Conference	17	8	0	.680	8	6	0	.571	T-3rd	—	DNP	—	NR	—
1963	Bill Wilhelm	Atlantic Coast Conference	15	11	0	.577	9	5	0	.643	T-2nd	—	DNP	—	NR	—
1964	Bill Wilhelm	Atlantic Coast Conference	13	13	0	.500	6	7	0	.462	T-4th	—	DNP	—	NR	—
1965	Bill Wilhelm	Atlantic Coast Conference	18	10	2	.663	9	5	0	.643	2nd	—	DNP	—	NR	—
1966	Bill Wilhelm	Atlantic Coast Conference	20	7	2	.724	9	4	0	.692	2nd	—	DNP	—	27	—
1967	Bill Wilhelm	Atlantic Coast Conference	29	9	0	.763	11	2	0	.846	1st	—	District 3 Regional	—	9	—
1968	Bill Wilhelm	Atlantic Coast Conference	27	14	0	.659	11	7	0	.611	4th	—	DNP	—	NR	—
1969	Bill Wilhelm	Atlantic Coast Conference	27	17	2	.609	12	8	1	.595	3rd	—	DNP	—	30	—
1970	Bill Wilhelm	Atlantic Coast Conference	32	16	0	.667	14	7	0	.667	2nd	—	DNP	—	18	—
1971	Bill Wilhelm	Atlantic Coast Conference	27	14	0	.659	10	4	0	.714	2nd	—	DNP	—	NR	—
1972	Bill Wilhelm	Atlantic Coast Conference	19	15	0	.559	6	7	0	.462	5th	—	DNP	—	NR	—
1973	Bill Wilhelm	Atlantic Coast Conference	24	16	0	.600	10	2	0	.833	T-1st	2nd	DNP	—	NR	—
1974	Bill Wilhelm	Atlantic Coast Conference	23	15	0	.605	10	1	0	.909	1st	2nd	DNP	—	NR	—
1975	Bill Wilhelm	Atlantic Coast Conference	33	10	0	.767	10	2	0	.833	T-1st	2nd	Mideast Regional	—	25	—
1976	Bill Wilhelm	Atlantic Coast Conference	36	15	0	.706	10	2	0	.833	1st	1st	College World Series	—	5	—
1977	Bill Wilhelm	Atlantic Coast Conference	42	10	0	.808	9	1	0	.900	1st	2nd	College World Series	—	5	—
1978	Bill Wilhelm	Atlantic Coast Conference	39	14	0	.746	10	2	0	.833	1st	1st	Atlantic Regional	—	25	—
1979	Bill Wilhelm	Atlantic Coast Conference	40	15	0	.727	10	1	0	.909	1st	—	Atlantic Regional	—	10	—
1980	Bill Wilhelm	Atlantic Coast Conference	38	21	0	.644	6	5	0	.545	3rd	1st	College World Series	—	8	—
1981	Bill Wilhelm	Atlantic Coast Conference	34	24	0	.586	10	4	0	.714	T-1st	1st	Atlantic Regional	NR	NR	—
1982	Bill Wilhelm	Atlantic Coast Conference	37	22	0	.627	10	2	0	.833	1st	4th	DNP	NR	NR	—
1983	Bill Wilhelm	Atlantic Coast Conference	30	20	1	.598	6	5	0	.545	3rd	2nd	DNP	NR	NR	—
1984	Bill Wilhelm	Atlantic Coast Conference	38	17	0	.691	12	2	0	.857	T-1st	T-3rd	DNP	NR	NR	—
1985	Bill Wilhelm	Atlantic Coast Conference	36	30	1	.545	9	4	0	.692	T-1st	2nd	DNP	NR	NR	—
1986	Bill Wilhelm	Atlantic Coast Conference	42	21	0	.667	9	4	0	.692	3rd	T-3rd	DNP	NR	NR	—
1987	Bill Wilhelm	Atlantic Coast Conference	54	14	1	.790	16	5	0	.762	2nd	3rd	South I Regional	10	10	—
1988	Bill Wilhelm	Atlantic Coast Conference	54	14	0	.794	18	2	0	.900	1st	3rd	Northeast Regional	15	21	—
1989	Bill Wilhelm	Atlantic Coast Conference	50	20	0	.714	13	5	0	.722	2nd	1st	Atlantic Regional	14	14	—
1990	Bill Wilhelm	Atlantic Coast Conference	43	23	0	.651	14	6	0	.700	2nd	T-3rd	Central Regional	NR	30	—
1991	Bill Wilhelm	Atlantic Coast Conference	60	10	0	.857	18	3	0	.857	1st	1st	College World Series	4	8	—
1992	Bill Wilhelm	Atlantic Coast Conference	50	14	0	.781	19	5	0	.792	1st	2nd	Mideast Regional	7	10	9
1993	Bill Wilhelm	Atlantic Coast Conference	45	20	0	.692	11	11	0	.500	5th	1st	East Regional	17	17	16
1994	Jack Leggett	Atlantic Coast Conference	57	18	0	.760	20	4	0	.833	1st	1st	East Regional	4	9	9
1995	Jack Leggett	Atlantic Coast Conference	54	14	0	.794	20	4	0	.833	1st	2nd	College World Series	6	7	7
1996	Jack Leggett	Atlantic Coast Conference	51	17	0	.750	17	7	0	.708	2nd	T-3rd	College World Series	5	4	4
1997	Jack Leggett	Atlantic Coast Conference	41	23	0	.641	13	10	0	.565	4th	2nd	Central Regional	NR	NR	24
1998	Jack Leggett	Atlantic Coast Conference	43	16	0	.729	14	9	0	.560	T-2nd	8th	East Regional	21	23	19
1999	Jack Leggett	Atlantic Coast Conference	42	27	0	.609	13	10	0	.565	3rd	2nd	College Station Super Regional	17	13	14
2000	Jack Leggett	Atlantic Coast Conference	51	18	0	.739	17	7	0	.708	2nd	2nd	College World Series	7	6	5
2001	Jack Leggett	Atlantic Coast Conference	41	22	0	.650	17	7	0	.708	2nd	T-5th	Coral Gables Super Regional	17	13	14
2002	Jack Leggett	Atlantic Coast Conference	54	17	0	.761	16	8	0	.667	4th	2nd	College World Series	3	3	3
2003	Jack Leggett	Atlantic Coast Conference	39	22	0	.639	15	9	0	.625	T-3rd	T-8th	Auburn Regional	NR	NR	NR
2004	Jack Leggett	Atlantic Coast Conference	39	26	0	.600	14	10	0	.583	T-4th	4th	Athens Regional	NR	26	NR
2005	Jack Leggett	Atlantic Coast Conference	43	23	0	.652	21	9	0	.700	2nd	Semifinal	Waco Super Regional	14	13	14
2006	Jack Leggett	Atlantic Coast Conference	53	16	0	.768	24	6	0	.800	1st (Atlantic)	1st	College World Series	5	5	5
2007	Jack Leggett	Atlantic Coast Conference	41	23	0	.641	18	12	0	.600	2nd (Atlantic)	2nd, Pool Play	Starkville Super Regional	15	12	13
2008	Jack Leggett	Atlantic Coast Conference	31	27	1	.534	11	18	1	.383	4th (Atlantic)	T-2nd, Pool Play	DNP	NR	NR	NR
2009	Jack Leggett	Atlantic Coast Conference	44	22	0	.667	19	11	0	.633	2nd (Atlantic)	T-2nd, Pool Play	Tempe Super Regional	16	15	14
2010	Jack Leggett	Atlantic Coast Conference	45	25	0	.643	18	12	0	.600	1st (Atlantic)	3rd, Pool Play	College World Series	10	4	4
2011	Jack Leggett	Atlantic Coast Conference	43	20	0	.683	17	13	0	.567	2nd (Atlantic)	2nd, Pool Play	Clemson Regional	21	21	16
2012	Jack Leggett	Atlantic Coast Conference	35	28	0	.556	16	14	0	.533	3rd (Atlantic)	3rd, Pool Play	Columbia Regional	NR	NR	NR
2013	Jack Leggett	Atlantic Coast Conference	40	22	0	.645	18	12	0	.600	3rd (Atlantic)	4th, Pool Play	Columbia Regional	NR	NR	NR
2014	Jack Leggett	Atlantic Coast Conference	36	25	0	.590	15	14	0	.517	2nd (Atlantic)	2nd, Pool Play	Nashville Regional	NR	NR	NR
2015	Jack Leggett	Atlantic Coast Conference	32	29	0	.525	16	13	0	.552	T-3rd (Atlantic)	T-2nd, Pool Play	Fullerton Regional	NR	NR	NR
2016	Monte Lee	Atlantic Coast Conference	44	20	0	.688	16	14	0	.533	4th (Atlantic)	1st	Clemson Regional	17	18	15
2017	Monte Lee	Atlantic Coast Conference	42	21	0	.667	17	13	0	.567	3rd (Atlantic)	3rd, Pool Play	Clemson Regional	23	25	22
2018	Monte Lee	Atlantic Coast Conference	47	16	0	.746	22	8	0	.733	1st (Atlantic)	T-3rd	Clemson Regional	19	18	17
2019	Monte Lee	Atlantic Coast Conference	35	26	0	.574	15	15	0	.500	4th (Atlantic)	2nd, Pool Play	Oxford Regional	22	25	25
2020	Monte Lee	Atlantic Coast Conference	14	3	0	.824	3	0	0	1.000	T–1st (Atlantic)	Tournament Cancelled	Tournament Cancelled	—	—	—
2021	Monte Lee	Atlantic Coast Conference	25	27	0	.481	16	20	0	.444	5th (Atlantic)	2nd, Pool Play	—	NR	NR	NR
2022	Monte Lee	Atlantic Coast Conference	35	23	0	.603	13	16	0	.448	6th (Atlantic)	3rd, Pool Play	—	NR	NR	NR
2023	Erik Bakich	Atlantic Coast Conference	44	19	0	.698	20	10	0	.667	2nd (Atlantic)	1st	Clemson Regional	15	17	18
2024	Erik Bakich	Atlantic Coast Conference	44	16	0	.733	20	10	0	.667	1st (Atlantic)	2nd, Pool Play	Clemson Super Regional	11	N/A	9
2025	Erik Bakich	Atlantic Coast Conference	45	18	0	.714	18	12	0	.600	5th	2nd	Clemson Regional	24	N/A	20
2026	Erik Bakich	Atlantic Coast Conference	31	26	0	.544	10	20	0	.333	15th	First Round	—	NR	NR	NR
Total			2,885	1,572	30	.646	(only includes regular season games)									
Total			144	113	0	.560	(only includes postseason games)									
Total			3,029	1,688	30	.641	(all games)									
