= Steve Traylor =

American baseball & basketball coach (born 1951)

Biographical details
- Born: February 15, 1951 (age 75); Ohio, U.S.

Playing career

Football
- 1969–1972: Otterbein

Basketball
- 1969–1973: Otterbein

Baseball
- 1970–1973: Otterbein

Coaching career (HC unless noted)

Baseball
- 1974–1976: Otterbein (asst.)
- 1981–1988: Florida Atlantic
- 1989–1999: Duke
- 2000–2007: Wofford

Men's basketball
- 1976–1979: Greensboro College

Head coaching record
- Overall: Baseball: 776–668–3; Men's basketball: 30–40
- Tournaments: Baseball; NCAA D1: 0–2; SoCon: 5–3; ACC: 6–22; NCAA D2: 0–3

Accomplishments and honors

Championships
- Baseball; SoCon Tournament (2007)

Awards
- Baseball; ACC Coach of the Year (1992)

Steve Traylor (born February 15, 1951) is an American former college baseball and basketball coach. In basketball, he was the head coach of Greensboro College. In baseball, he was the head coach at Florida Atlantic, Duke, and Wofford. Traylor had 776 career wins and led both Florida Atlantic and Wofford to their first NCAA tournaments.

== Playing career ==
Traylor played football, basketball, and baseball at both Westerville South High School and Otterbein College. At Otterbein, Traylor was a team captain and all-conference player in all three sports. After graduating from Otterbein in 1973, he attended Buffalo Bills training camp but was cut.

== Coaching career ==
=== Baseball ===
==== Otterbein ====
While working on his graduate degree at Ohio State University, Traylor served as an assistant coach at his alma mater, Otterbein, from 1974 to 1976. He then coached basketball for three seasons before returning to baseball.

==== Florida Atlantic ====
In 1979, Traylor got his first baseball head coaching job when Florida Atlantic (FAU) hired him to start their baseball program. The Owls, then an NAIA program, went 15–16 in their first season (1981). They then made the NAIA Tournament in 1982 and 1983, advancing to the District Championship in 1982 and as far as the Area Championship in 1983.

The Owls moved to the NCAA for the 1984 season, competing in Division II. In their first game as an NCAA member, they defeated Florida, 4–3; overall, the team went 40–15 in 1984. In 1985, the program made the NCAA tournament for the first time. There, it was swept by Florida Southern in the best-of-five South Regional.

FAU had five straight 40-win seasons from 1982 to 1986. In Traylor's seven years as head coach, the program went 268–105–2.

During Traylor's tenure, six Owls were selected in the Major League Baseball draft, including Jeff Forney, a first-round pick in the June secondary draft in 1985, and Mike Ryan, a seventh-round pick in 1984.

==== Duke ====
Following the 1987 season, Division I Duke hired Traylor to replace Larry Smith. After three losing seasons in his first four, the Blue Devils had seven straight 30-win seasons from 1992 to 1998; Traylor was named the ACC Coach of the Year in the first of these seasons. Duke's deepest run in the ACC tournament, which at the time included each member of the conference, came in 1997. They received the seventh seed after a 31–23 (9–14 ACC) regular season. After losing to second-seeded Florida State in the opening round, Duke beat sixth-seeded Virginia and top-seeded Georgia Tech before being eliminated by a second loss to Florida State.

Duke had 25 MLB Draft selections in Traylor's 12 seasons. 1996 third-round pick Scott Schoeneweis was his highest. Schoeneweis, along with Mike Trombley, John Courtright, Quinton McCracken, Ryan Jackson, and Chris Capuano, went on to play in Major League Baseball.

In 1999, Duke went 24–31 and finished last in the ACC. Traylor was fired after the season. His overall record at Duke was 356–286–1.

==== Wofford ====
Traylor became Wofford's head coach for the 2000 season. His highest win total came in 2003, when the Terriers went 26–31 and tied for sixth in the Southern Conference (SoCon). In 2007, Traylor announced his retirement in the closing weeks of the regular season, citing a desire to spend more time with his family. The Terriers tied for last in the conference but made the conference tournament in a season in which the entire SoCon qualified. There, it beat Furman in a play-in game, then defeated College of Charleston, UNC Greensboro, and The Citadel twice to win the tournament. In doing so, it won the SoCon's automatic bid to the program's first NCAA tournament. In the Columbia, SC Regional, Wofford went 0–2, losing games to host South Carolina and second-seeded NC State.

=== Basketball ===
Traylor served as Greensboro's head men's basketball coach for three seasons (1976 to 1979). During his tenure, the Pride went 30–40. His best season was his first, in which the team went 17–7. Traylor was also Greensboro's athletic director during his time there.

== Head coaching record ==
Below is a table of Traylor's yearly records as a collegiate head baseball and basketball coach.

=== Baseball ===
Record table
Season	Team	Overall	Conference	Standing	Postseason
Florida Atlantic (Independent – NAIA) (1981–1983)
1981	Florida Atlantic	15–16			
1982	Florida Atlantic	42–14			NAIA District Tournament
1983	Florida Atlantic	49–14			NAIA Area Tournament
Florida Atlantic (Division II Independent) (1984–1987)
1984	Florida Atlantic	40–15			
1985	Florida Atlantic	44–15			NCAA Regional
1986	Florida Atlantic	44–10			
1987	Florida Atlantic	34–21–2			
Florida Atlantic:		268–105–2			
Duke (Atlantic Coast Conference) (1988–1999)
1988	Duke	10–35	3–16	8th	ACC tournament (Note: In this season, all members of the Atlantic Coast Conference qualified for the postseason baseball tournament.)
1989	Duke	20–23	2–14	8th	ACC tournament
1990	Duke	28–25	4–15	7th	ACC tournament
1991	Duke	24–27	6–15	7th	ACC tournament
1992	Duke	38–16	12–12	5th	ACC tournament
1993	Duke	39–19–1	11–13	6th	ACC tournament
1994	Duke	33–20	16–8	T–2nd	ACC tournament
1995	Duke	30–27	4–20	T–8th	ACC tournament
1996	Duke	39–18	9–14	7th	ACC tournament
1997	Duke	33–25	9–14	7th	ACC tournament
1998	Duke	38–20	8–15	7th	ACC tournament
1999	Duke	24–31	4–18	9th	ACC tournament
Duke:		356–286–1	88–174		
Wofford (Southern Conference) (2000–2007)
2000	Wofford	16–38	7–22	11th	
2001	Wofford	17–31	9–17	9th	
2002	Wofford	26–31	14–16	T–6th	SoCon tournament
2003	Wofford	9–40	7–22	11th	
2004	Wofford	17–30	8–22	10th	
2005	Wofford	17–37	7–23	10th	
2006	Wofford	20–37	5–22	10th	SoCon tournament (Note: In this season, all members of the Southern Conference qualified for the postseason baseball tournament.)
2007	Wofford	30–33	8–19	T–9th	NCAA Regional
Wofford:		152–277	65–163		
Total:		776–668–3			
National champion Postseason invitational champion Conference regular season champion Conference regular season and conference tournament champion Division regular season champion Division regular season and conference tournament champion Conference tournament champion

=== Basketball ===
Record table
Season	Team	Overall	Conference	Standing	Postseason
Greensboro (Dixie Conference – DIII) (1976–1979)
1976–77	Greensboro	17–7	10–4		
1977–78	Greensboro	7–17	4–11		
1978–79	Greensboro	6–16	3–11		
Greensboro:		30–40	17–26		
Total:		30–40			
National champion Postseason invitational champion Conference regular season champion Conference regular season and conference tournament champion Division regular season champion Division regular season and conference tournament champion Conference tournament champion

== Hall of Fame inductions ==
Traylor is a member of several Halls of Fame: Westerville South High School Athletics, Otterbein Athletics, FAU Athletics, and FAU Baseball.
