= Clemson Tigers baseball, 1990–1999 =

American college baseball seasons

The Clemson Tigers baseball teams represented Clemson University in Clemson, South Carolina, United States in the sport of college baseball in the NCAA Division I Atlantic Coast Conference. The program was established in 1896, and has continuously fielded a team since 1945. In this decade, the Tigers reached the College World Series in Omaha, Nebraska three times, reached the Super Regional round in 1999 (the only year in the decade which had Super Regionals), and appeared in the NCAA Division I Baseball Championship every year.

== 1990 ==
1990 Clemson Tigers baseball

Central Regional, 1–2
- Conference: Atlantic Coast Conference
- CB: No. 30
- Record: 43–23 (14–6 ACC)
- Head coach: Bill Wilhelm (33rd season)
- Assistant coaches: Kurt Seibert (2nd season); Dick Grapenthin (1st season); Randy Mazey (1st season)
- Home stadium: Beautiful Tiger Field

1990 Atlantic Coast Conference baseball standings
	Conf.				Overall
Team	W		L	PCT	W		L	PCT
No. 21 North Carolina ‍†‍‡‍^{y}	17	–	4	.810	51	–	18	.739
No. 30 Clemson ‍‍‍^{y}	14	–	6	.700	43	–	23	.652
No. 26 NC State ‍‍‍^{y}	14	–	7	.667	48	–	20	.706
Wake Forest ‍‍‍	10	–	10	.500	35	–	24	.593
Georgia Tech ‍‍‍^{y}	9	–	9	.500	46	–	25	.648
Virginia ‍‍‍	7	–	11	.389	21	–	32	.396
Duke ‍‍‍	4	–	15	.211	28	–	25	.528
Maryland ‍‍‍	2	–	15	.118	22	–	26	.458
† – Conference champion ‡ – Tournament champion y – Invited to the NCAA tournament As of June 30, 1990; Rankings from Collegiate Baseball

=== Roster ===
1990 Clemson Tigers roster
- Eric Bradford; - Paxton Briley; - Fred Daniels; - Chuck Foster; - Chet Kendall; - Jeff Miller; - Jeff Morris; - John A. Pawlowski; - Tim Peele; - Chad Phillips; - Tad Smith	**Pitchers**: - Jason Angel; - Brian Faw; - Ron Frazier; - Aaron Jersild; - Mike Kimbrell; - Tim Parker; - David Tripp	**Catchers**: - Jim Anderson; - Mike Couture; **Infielders**: - Jim Crowley; - Tim Rigsby; - Todd Stefan	**Outfielders**: - Brian Kowitz; - Kevin Northrup; - Michael Spiers; **Utility/Designated Hitter**: - Joe DeBerry; - Eric Macrina

=== Schedule ===
Legend
	Clemson win
	Clemson loss
**Bold**	Clemson team member
*	Non-Conference game
Ranks from Collegiate Baseball, tournament seeds in parentheses.

1990 Clemson Tigers baseball game log
Regular season

February
Date	Opponent	Site/stadium	Score	Overall record	ACC record
Feb 17	at UNC Wilmington*	Brooks Field • Wilmington, NC	**W** 13–8	1–0	
Feb 18	at UNC Wilmington*	Brooks Field • Wilmington, NC	**W** 18–2	2–0	
Feb 24	at Auburn*	Plainsman Park • Auburn, AL	**W** 6–3	3–0	
Feb 25	at Auburn*	Plainsman Park • Auburn, AL	**W** 6–0	4–0	
Feb 28	Western Carolina*	Beautiful Tiger Field • Clemson, SC	**W** 14–2	5–0	

March
Date	Opponent	Site/stadium	Score	Overall record	ACC record
Mar 4	at Duke	Jack Coombs Field • Durham, NC	**W** 12–9	6–0	1–0
Mar 4	at Duke	Jack Coombs Field • Durham, NC	**L** 3–4	6–1	1–1
Mar 6	Old Dominion*	Beautiful Tiger Field • Clemson, SC	**W** 5–3	7–1	
Mar 7	Old Dominion*	Beautiful Tiger Field • Clemson, SC	**W** 6–5	8–1	
Mar 8	Old Dominion*	Beautiful Tiger Field • Clemson, SC	**W** 8–1	9–1	
Mar 9	Wake Forest	Beautiful Tiger Field • Clemson, SC	**W** 10–4	10–1	2–1
Mar 10	Wake Forest	Beautiful Tiger Field • Clemson, SC	**L** 1–3	10–2	2–2
Mar 11	Wake Forest	Beautiful Tiger Field • Clemson, SC	**W** 11–8	11–2	3–2
Mar 12	Marshall*	Beautiful Tiger Field • Clemson, SC	**W** 13–0	12–2	
Mar 13	Marshall*	Beautiful Tiger Field • Clemson, SC	**W** 7–3	13–2	
Mar 14	Marshall*	Beautiful Tiger Field • Clemson, SC	**W** 16–2	14–2	
Mar 17	Maryland	Beautiful Tiger Field • Clemson, SC	**W** 10–1^{7}	15–2	4–2
Mar 17	Maryland	Beautiful Tiger Field • Clemson, SC	**W** 7–1^{7}	16–2	5–2
Mar 18	Maryland	Beautiful Tiger Field • Clemson, SC	**W** 8–1	17–2	6–2
Mar 19	Ohio*	Beautiful Tiger Field • Clemson, SC	**W** 12–6	18–2	
Mar 20	Ohio*	Beautiful Tiger Field • Clemson, SC	**W** 6–4	19–2	
Mar 22	at Miami (FL)*	Mark Light Field • Coral Gables, FL	**L** 2–9	19–3	
Mar 23	at Miami (FL)*	Mark Light Field • Coral Gables, FL	**L** 5–11	19–4	
Mar 24	at Miami (FL)*	Mark Light Field • Coral Gables, FL	**L** 1–2	19–5	
Mar 27	Coastal Carolina*	Beautiful Tiger Field • Clemson, SC	**L** 2–11^{7}	19–6	
Mar 27	Coastal Carolina*	Beautiful Tiger Field • Clemson, SC	**W** 1–0^{7}	20–6	
Mar 28	at Georgia*	Foley Field • Athens, GA	**L** 8–9	20–7	
Mar 31	vs South Carolina*	Greenville Municipal Stadium • Greenville, SC	**W** 6–0	21–7	

April
Date	Opponent	Site/stadium	Score	Overall record	ACC record
Apr 1	South Carolina*	Beautiful Tiger Field • Clemson, SC	**W** 6–5^{11}	22–7	
Apr 2	South Carolina*	Beautiful Tiger Field • Clemson, SC	**W** 9–0	23–7	
Apr 3	East Tennessee State*	Beautiful Tiger Field • Clemson, SC	**W** 11–4	24–7	
Apr 4	at Furman*	Latham Baseball Stadium • Greenville, SC	**W** 10–2	25–7	
Apr 6	at North Carolina	Boshamer Stadium • Chapel Hill, NC	**L** 8–10	25–8	6–3
Apr 7	at North Carolina	Boshamer Stadium • Chapel Hill, NC	**L** 3–9	25–9	6–4
Apr 8	at North Carolina	Boshamer Stadium • Chapel Hill, NC	**L** 10–11	25–10	6–5
Apr 10	Appalachian State*	Beautiful Tiger Field • Clemson, SC	**W** 2–1^{7}	26–10	
Apr 11	Furman*	Beautiful Tiger Field • Clemson, SC	**W** 17–6	27–10	
Apr 12	at South Carolina*	Sarge Frye Field • Columbia, SC	**L** 2–21	27–11	
Apr 13	NC State	Beautiful Tiger Field • Clemson, SC	**W** 6–3	28–11	7–5
Apr 14	NC State	Beautiful Tiger Field • Clemson, SC	**W** 20–4	29–11	8–5
Apr 15	NC State	Beautiful Tiger Field • Clemson, SC	**W** 6–5	30–11	9–5
Apr 17	Georgia Southern*	Beautiful Tiger Field • Clemson, SC	**W** 13–0	31–11	
Apr 18	Georgia Southern*	Beautiful Tiger Field • Clemson, SC	**L** 6–9	31–12	
Apr 20	at Virginia	UVA Baseball Field • Charlottesville, VA	**W** 12–6	32–12	10–5
Apr 21	at Virginia	UVA Baseball Field • Charlottesville, VA	**W** 19–3	33–12	11–5
Apr 22	at Virginia	UVA Baseball Field • Charlottesville, VA	**W** 8–0	34–12	12–5
Apr 24	Tennessee*	Beautiful Tiger Field • Clemson, SC	**L** 5–7	34–13	
Apr 25	Tennessee*	Beautiful Tiger Field • Clemson, SC	**W** 14–2	35–13	
Apr 27	at Georgia Tech	Russ Chandler Stadium • Atlanta, GA	**W** 14–12	36–13	13–5
Apr 28	Georgia Tech	Beautiful Tiger Field • Clemson, SC	**L** 3–8	36–14	13–6
Apr 29	at Georgia Tech	Russ Chandler Stadium • Atlanta, GA	**W** 17–10	37–14	14–6

May
Date	Opponent	Site/stadium	Score	Overall record	ACC record
May 6	at South Carolina*	Sarge Frye Field • Columbia, SC	**L** 4–5	37–15	
May 6	at South Carolina*	Sarge Frye Field • Columbia, SC	**L** 3–7^{7}	37–16	
May 8	at Tennessee*	Lindsey Nelson Stadium • Knoxville, TN	**W** 15–3	38–16	
May 10	Campbell*	Beautiful Tiger Field • Clemson, SC	**W** 8–4	39–16	

Postseason

ACC Tournament
Date	Opponent	Rank	Site/stadium	Score	Overall record	ACCT Record
May 12	(7) Duke	(2)	Greenville Municipal Stadium • Greenville, SC	**W** 13–3	40–16	1–0
May 13	(6) Virginia	(2)	Greenville Municipal Stadium • Greenville, SC	**W** 7–3	41–16	2–0
May 14	(1) North Carolina	(2)	Greenville Municipal Stadium • Greenville, SC	**L** 1–3	41–17	2–1
May 25	(3) NC State	(2)	Greenville Municipal Stadium • Greenville, SC	**L** 5–6	41–18	2–2

May
Date	Opponent	Site/stadium	Score	Overall record
May 18	vs Southern California*	Boshamer Stadium • Chapel Hill, NC	**L** 0–1	41–19
May 19	vs Fresno State*	Boshamer Stadium • Chapel Hill, NC	**L** 2–5	41–20
May 20	vs Arizona*	Boshamer Stadium • Chapel Hill, NC	**W** 9–1	42–20
May 21	at The Citadel*	College Park • Charleston, SC	**L** 2–11	42–21

NCAA Central Regional
Date	Opponent	Rank	Site/stadium	Score	Overall record	Regional Record
May 25	(5) Creighton	(2)	Disch–Falk Field • Austin, TX	**L** 6–9	42–22	0–1
May 26	(6) Texas–Arlington	(2)	Disch–Falk Field • Austin, TX	**W** 8–5	43–22	1–1
May 27	(5) Creighton	(2)	Disch–Falk Field • Austin, TX	**L** 3–4	43–23	1–2

== 1992 ==
1992 Clemson Tigers baseball

Atlantic Coast Conference champions

Mideast Regional, 1–2
- Conference: Atlantic Coast Conference

Ranking
- Coaches: No. 9
- CB: No. 10
- Record: 50–14 (19–5 ACC)
- Head coach: Bill Wilhelm (35th season)
- Assistant coaches: Jack Leggett (1st season); Randy Mazey (3rd season); Michael Spiers (1st season)
- Home stadium: Beautiful Tiger Field

1992 Atlantic Coast Conference baseball standings
	Conf.				Overall
Team	W		L	PCT	W		L	PCT
No. 10 Clemson ‍†‍‍^{y}	19	–	5	.792	50	–	14	.781
No. 5 Florida State ‍‍‍^{y}	16	–	7	.696	49	–	21	.700
No. 29 NC State ‍‍‡‍^{y}	15	–	9	.625	46	–	18	.719
No. 24 Georgia Tech ‍‍‍^{y}	14	–	9	.609	45	–	19	.703
Duke ‍‍‍	12	–	12	.500	38	–	16	.704
Wake Forest ‍‍‍	11	–	13	.458	36	–	22	.621
North Carolina ‍‍‍	8	–	16	.333	31	–	27	.534
Maryland ‍‍‍	7	–	15	.318	27	–	28	.491
Virginia ‍‍‍	3	–	19	.136	21	–	30	.412
† – Conference champion ‡ – Tournament champion y – Invited to the NCAA tournament As of June 30, 1992; Rankings from Collegiate Baseball

=== Roster ===
1992 Clemson Tigers roster
- Eric Bradford; - Paxton Briley; - Chris Carter; - Fred Daniels; - Jamie Eggleston; - Trent Hackle; - John Lawton; - Scott Metzer; - Andy Monin	**Pitchers**: - Jason Angel; - Mike Holtz; - Aaron Jersild; - Scott Miller; - Jeff Sauve; - Andy Taulbee	**Catchers**: - Mike Lockhart; **Infielders**: - Ted Corbin; - Jeff Miller; - Jeff Morris; - Joe Taylor	**Outfielders**: - Billy McMillon; - Kevin Northrup; - Shawn Satterfield; - Keith Williams; **Utility/Designated Hitter**: - Chad Phillips

=== Schedule ===
Legend
	Clemson win
	Clemson loss
**Bold**	Clemson team member
*	Non-Conference game
Ranks from Collegiate Baseball, tournament seeds in parentheses.

1992 Clemson Tigers baseball game log
Regular season

February
Date	Opponent	Site/stadium	Score	Overall record	ACC record
Feb 16	Eastern Kentucky*	Beautiful Tiger Field • Clemson, SC	**W** 7–0	1–0	
Feb 16	Eastern Kentucky*	Beautiful Tiger Field • Clemson, SC	**W** 22–0	2–0	
Feb 19	Western Carolina*	Beautiful Tiger Field • Clemson, SC	**W** 6–0	3–0	
Feb 21	Tampa*	Beautiful Tiger Field • Clemson, SC	**W** 15–1	4–0	
Feb 22	Tampa*	Beautiful Tiger Field • Clemson, SC	**W** 16–5	5–0	
Feb 22	Tampa*	Beautiful Tiger Field • Clemson, SC	**W** 3–0	6–0	
Feb 29	at Auburn*	Plainsman Park • Auburn, AL	**W** 4–3	7–0	

March
Date	Opponent	Site/stadium	Score	Overall record	ACC record
Mar 1	at Auburn*	Plainsman Park • Auburn, AL	**W** 9–3	8–0	
Mar 3	Winthrop*	Beautiful Tiger Field • Clemson, SC	**W** 1–0	9–0	
Mar 5	Furman*	Beautiful Tiger Field • Clemson, SC	**W** 20–2	10–0	
Mar 7	Wake Forest	Beautiful Tiger Field • Clemson, SC	**W** 7–2^{7}	11–0	1–0
Mar 7	Wake Forest	Beautiful Tiger Field • Clemson, SC	**W** 2–1^{8}	12–0	2–0
Mar 8	Wake Forest	Beautiful Tiger Field • Clemson, SC	**W** 7–5	13–0	3–0
Mar 9	Coastal Carolina*	Beautiful Tiger Field • Clemson, SC	**W** 2–1	14–0	
Mar 10	Coastal Carolina*	Beautiful Tiger Field • Clemson, SC	**W** 12–2	15–0	
Mar 13	Maryland	Beautiful Tiger Field • Clemson, SC	**W** 15–3	16–0	4–0
Mar 14	Maryland	Beautiful Tiger Field • Clemson, SC	**W** 10–1	17–0	5–0
Mar 15	Maryland	Beautiful Tiger Field • Clemson, SC	**L** 9–10	17–1	5–1
Mar 17	at Duke	Jack Coombs Field • Durham, NC	**W** 15–7	18–1	6–1
Mar 18	at Duke	Jack Coombs Field • Durham, NC	**W** 9–1	19–1	7–1
Mar 19	at Duke	Jack Coombs Field • Durham, NC	**L** 1–2	19–2	7–2
Mar 20	at Virginia	UVA Baseball Field • Charlottesville, VA	**W** 8–6	20–2	8–2
Mar 21	at Virginia	UVA Baseball Field • Charlottesville, VA	**W** 5–3	21–2	9–2
Mar 22	at Virginia	UVA Baseball Field • Charlottesville, VA	**W** 8–2	22–2	10–2
Mar 23	Ohio*	Beautiful Tiger Field • Clemson, SC	**L** 3–7	22–3	
Mar 24	Ohio*	Beautiful Tiger Field • Clemson, SC	**W** 10–2	23–3	
Mar 26	at South Carolina*	Sarge Frye Field • Columbia, SC	**L** 6–8	23–4	
Mar 27	Florida State	Beautiful Tiger Field • Clemson, SC	**W** 10–4	24–4	11–2
Mar 28	Florida State	Beautiful Tiger Field • Clemson, SC	**W** 12–0	25–4	12–2
Mar 29	Florida State	Beautiful Tiger Field • Clemson, SC	**W** 14–0	26–4	13–2
Mar 31	at Georgia*	Foley Field • Athens, GA	**W** 8–4	27–4	

April
Date	Opponent	Site/stadium	Score	Overall record	ACC record
Apr 1	Georgia*	Beautiful Tiger Field • Clemson, SC	**L** 2–3	27–5	
Apr 2	vs Winthrop*	Knights Stadium • Fort Mill, SC	**W** 12–11^{11}	28–5	
Apr 3	at North Carolina	Boshamer Stadium • Chapel Hill, NC	**W** 10–4	29–5	14–2
Apr 4	at North Carolina	Boshamer Stadium • Chapel Hill, NC	**W** 7–1	30–5	15–2
Apr 5	at North Carolina	Boshamer Stadium • Chapel Hill, NC	**W** 12–5	31–5	16–2
Apr 7	Georgia Southern*	Beautiful Tiger Field • Clemson, SC	**W** 10–5^{7}	32–5	
Apr 7	Georgia Southern*	Beautiful Tiger Field • Clemson, SC	**W** 7–2^{7}	33–5	
Apr 8	South Carolina*	Beautiful Tiger Field • Clemson, SC	**W** 5–3	34–5	
Apr 10	NC State	Beautiful Tiger Field • Clemson, SC	**W** 6–2	35–5	17–2
Apr 11	NC State	Beautiful Tiger Field • Clemson, SC	**L** 3–6	35–6	17–3
Apr 12	NC State	Beautiful Tiger Field • Clemson, SC	**W** 3–2	36–6	18–3
Apr 14	at Tennessee*	Lindsey Nelson Stadium • Knoxville, TN	**L** 3–4	36–7	
Apr 15	at Tennessee*	Lindsey Nelson Stadium • Knoxville, TN	**W** 8–2	37–7	
Apr 19	Appalachian State*	Beautiful Tiger Field • Clemson, SC	**W** 5–3	38–7	
Apr 20	Appalachian State*	Beautiful Tiger Field • Clemson, SC	**W** 7–5	39–7	
Apr 21	South Carolina*	Beautiful Tiger Field • Clemson, SC	**W** 10–9	40–7	
Apr 22	at Georgia*	Foley Field • Athens, GA	**W** 9–1	41–7	
Apr 24	at Georgia Tech	Russ Chandler Stadium • Atlanta, GA	**L** 2–6	41–8	18–4
Apr 25	at Georgia Tech	Russ Chandler Stadium • Atlanta, GA	**L** 6–7^{10}	41–9	18–5
Apr 26	at Georgia Tech	Russ Chandler Stadium • Atlanta, GA	**W** 5–4	42–9	19–5

May
Date	Opponent	Site/stadium	Score	Overall record	ACC record
May 2	at UNC Wilmington*	Brooks Field • Wilmington, NC	**W** 8–1	43–9	
May 3	at UNC Wilmington*	Brooks Field • Wilmington, NC	**L** 1–5	43–10	
May 4	at Georgia Southern*	J. I. Clements Stadium • Statesboro, GA	**W** 10–2	44–10	
May 5	at Georgia Southern*	J. I. Clements Stadium • Statesboro, GA	**W** 7–1	45–10	

Postseason

ACC Tournament
Date	Opponent	Rank	Site/stadium	Score	Overall record	ACCT Record
May 9	(9) Virginia	(1)	Greenville Municipal Stadium • Greenville, SC	**W** 3–2^{10}	46–10	1–0
May 11	(2) Florida State	(1)	Greenville Municipal Stadium • Greenville, SC	**W** 5–2	47–10	2–0
May 12	(3) NC State	(1)	Greenville Municipal Stadium • Greenville, SC	**L** 1–11	47–11	2–1
May 12	(4) Georgia Tech	(1)	Greenville Municipal Stadium • Greenville, SC	**W** 5–4	48–11	3–1
May 13	(2) Florida State	(1)	Greenville Municipal Stadium • Greenville, SC	**W** 11–0	49–11	4–1
May 13	(3) NC State	(1)	Greenville Municipal Stadium • Greenville, SC	**L** 3–7	49–12	4–2

NCAA Mideast Regional
Date	Opponent	Rank	Site/stadium	Score	Overall record	Regional Record
May 21	(6) Yale	(1)	Dudy Noble Field • Starkville, MS	**W** 7–3	50–12	1–0
May 22	(4) UCLA	(1)	Dudy Noble Field • Starkville, MS	**L** 5–6	50–13	1–1
May 23	(3) Oklahoma	(1)	Dudy Noble Field • Starkville, MS	**L** 6–7	50–14	1–2

== 1993 ==
1993 Clemson Tigers baseball

Mideast Regional, 2–2
- Conference: Atlantic Coast Conference

Ranking
- Coaches: No. 16
- CB: No. 17
- Record: 45–20 (11–11 ACC)
- Head coach: Bill Wilhelm (36th season)
- Assistant coaches: Jack Leggett (2nd season); Randy Mazey (4th season); Jim Schlossnagle (1st season)
- Home stadium: Beautiful Tiger Field

1993 Atlantic Coast Conference baseball standings
	Conf.				Overall
Team	W		L	PCT	W		L	PCT
No. 13 Georgia Tech ‍†‍‍^{y}	16	–	6	.727	47	–	14	.770
No. 21 NC State ‍‍‍^{y}	15	–	7	.682	49	–	17	.742
No. 22 Florida State ‍‍‍^{y}	14	–	9	.609	46	–	19	.708
No. 23 North Carolina ‍‍‍^{y}	13	–	10	.565	43	–	20	.683
No. 17 Clemson ‍‍‡‍^{y}	11	–	11	.500	45	–	20	.692
Duke ‍‍‍	11	–	13	.458	39	–	19	.672
Wake Forest ‍‍‍	9	–	13	.409	31	–	22	.585
Virginia ‍‍‍	7	–	15	.318	21	–	30	.412
Maryland ‍‍‍	5	–	17	.227	24	–	29	.453
† – Conference champion ‡ – Tournament champion y – Invited to the NCAA tournament As of June 30, 1993; Rankings from Collegiate Baseball

=== Roster ===
1993 Clemson Tigers roster
- Chris Carter; - Jamie Eggleston; - Jeff Keppen; - Scott Metzer; - Hoby Mork; - Chris Sturgeon; - Rodney Williams	**Pitchers**: - Jason Dawsey; - Mike Holtz; - Chad Phillips; - Jeff Sauve; - Andy Taulbee; - Scott Winchester	**Catchers**: - Mike Eydenberg; - Andy Monin; **Infielders**: - Seth Brizek; - Paul Galloway; - Mike Hampton; - David Miller; - Jeff Miller; - Shane Monahan; - Jeff Morris; - Joe Taylor	**Outfielders**: - Dexter McLeon; - Billy McMillon; - Shawn Satterfield; - Keith Williams

=== Schedule ===
Legend
	Clemson win
	Clemson loss
**Bold**	Clemson team member
*	Non-Conference game
Ranks from Collegiate Baseball, tournament seeds in parentheses.

1993 Clemson Tigers baseball game log
Regular season

February
Date	Opponent	Site/stadium	Score	Overall record	ACC record
Feb 20	Auburn*	Beautiful Tiger Field • Clemson, SC	**W** 9–6	1–0	
Feb 23	Appalachian State*	Beautiful Tiger Field • Clemson, SC	**W** 13–2	2–0	
Feb 24	Winthrop*	Beautiful Tiger Field • Clemson, SC	**W** 11–6	3–0	
Feb 27	Duke	Beautiful Tiger Field • Clemson, SC	**L** 6–7	3–1	0–1
Feb 28	Duke	Beautiful Tiger Field • Clemson, SC	**W** 16–7	4–1	1–1

March
Date	Opponent	Site/stadium	Score	Overall record	ACC record
Mar 1	Duke	Beautiful Tiger Field • Clemson, SC	**L** 4–13	4–2	1–2
Mar 2	UNC Wilmington*	Beautiful Tiger Field • Clemson, SC	**W** 7–5	5–2	
Mar 2	UNC Wilmington*	Beautiful Tiger Field • Clemson, SC	**W** 9–2	6–2	
Mar 6	at Wake Forest	Gene Hooks Stadium • Winston-Salem, NC	**L** 1–3^{7}	6–3	1–3
Mar 6	at Wake Forest	Gene Hooks Stadium • Winston-Salem, NC	**W** 4–1^{7}	7–3	2–3
Mar 7	at Wake Forest	Gene Hooks Stadium • Winston-Salem, NC	**W** 8–5	8–3	3–3
Mar 9	Coastal Carolina*	Beautiful Tiger Field • Clemson, SC	**W** 6–5^{11}	9–3	
Mar 10	Coastal Carolina*	Beautiful Tiger Field • Clemson, SC	**W** 8–3	10–3	
Mar 12	Virginia	Beautiful Tiger Field • Clemson, SC	**W** 15–1	11–3	4–3
Mar 15	vs Nebraska*	Pete Beiden Field • Fresno, CA	**L** 0–5	11–4	
Mar 16	vs St. John's*	Pete Beiden Field • Fresno, CA	**L** 6–10	11–5	
Mar 17	vs Missouri State*	Pete Beiden Field • Fresno, CA	**W** 8–7	12–5	
Mar 18	vs Texas Tech*	Pete Beiden Field • Fresno, CA	**W** 5–0	13–5	
Mar 19	vs Kansas State*	Pete Beiden Field • Fresno, CA	**L** 0–3	13–6	
Mar 20	vs Missouri State*	Pete Beiden Field • Fresno, CA	**W** 5–4	14–6	
Mar 24	Georgia Southern*	Beautiful Tiger Field • Clemson, SC	**W** 10–7^{7}	15–6	
Mar 24	Georgia Southern*	Beautiful Tiger Field • Clemson, SC	**W** 4–1^{7}	16–6	
Mar 26	Ohio*	Beautiful Tiger Field • Clemson, SC	**L** 2–12	16–7	
Mar 27	Ohio*	Beautiful Tiger Field • Clemson, SC	**W** 5–2^{7}	17–7	
Mar 28	Ohio*	Beautiful Tiger Field • Clemson, SC	**W** 21–1	18–7	
Mar 30	Furman*	Beautiful Tiger Field • Clemson, SC	**W** 11–4	19–7	
Mar 31	at Georgia*	Foley Field • Athens, GA	**W** 6–2	20–7	

April
Date	Opponent	Site/stadium	Score	Overall record	ACC record
Apr 2	North Carolina	Beautiful Tiger Field • Clemson, SC	**W** 7–2	21–7	5–3
Apr 3	North Carolina	Beautiful Tiger Field • Clemson, SC	**L** 5–10	21–8	5–4
Apr 4	North Carolina	Beautiful Tiger Field • Clemson, SC	**W** 4–3	22–8	6–4
Apr 6	South Carolina*	Beautiful Tiger Field • Clemson, SC	**W** 17–3	23–8	
Apr 7	at South Carolina*	Sarge Frye Field • Columbia, SC	**W** 9–8	24–8	
Apr 9	at NC State	Doak Field • Raleigh, NC	**W** 4–1	25–8	7–4
Apr 10	at NC State	Doak Field • Raleigh, NC	**L** 5–20	25–9	7–5
Apr 11	at NC State	Doak Field • Raleigh, NC	**L** 12–13	25–10	7–6
Apr 13	at Western Carolina*	Hennon Stadium • Cullowhee, NC	**W** 12–2	26–10	
Apr 14	Georgia*	Beautiful Tiger Field • Clemson, SC	**W** 8–6	27–10	
Apr 15	Western Carolina*	Beautiful Tiger Field • Clemson, SC	**W** 8–1	28–10	
Apr 17	at Maryland	Shipley Field • College Park, MD	**W** 6–2	29–10	8–6
Apr 18	vs Maryland	Memorial Stadium • Baltimore, MD	**L** 4–8	29–11	8–7
Apr 19	at Maryland	Shipley Field • College Park, MD	**W** 22–4	30–11	9–7
Apr 20	at Furman*	Furman Baseball Stadium • Greenville, SC	**W** 17–2	31–11	
Apr 21	South Carolina*	Beautiful Tiger Field • Clemson, SC	**W** 8–7^{11}	32–11	
Apr 23	Georgia Tech	Beautiful Tiger Field • Clemson, SC	**L** 0–11	32–12	9–8
Apr 24	Georgia Tech	Beautiful Tiger Field • Clemson, SC	**L** 5–10	32–13	9–9
Apr 25	Georgia Tech	Beautiful Tiger Field • Clemson, SC	**L** 0–6	32–14	9–10

May
Date	Opponent	Site/stadium	Score	Overall record	ACC record
May 2	at Winthrop*	Eagle Field • Rock Hill, SC	**W** 17–1	33–14	
May 4	Tennessee*	Beautiful Tiger Field • Clemson, SC	**W** 10–3	34–14	
May 5	Tennessee*	Beautiful Tiger Field • Clemson, SC	**W** 4–2	35–14	
May 7	at Florida State	Dick Howser Stadium • Tallahassee, FL	**W** 7–6	36–14	10–10
May 8	at Florida State	Dick Howser Stadium • Tallahassee, FL	**L** 3–4^{10}	36–15	10–11
May 9	at Florida State	Dick Howser Stadium • Tallahassee, FL	**W** 5–1	37–15	11–11
May 11	Georgia*	Beautiful Tiger Field • Clemson, SC	**L** 2–4	37–16	
May 12	at South Carolina*	Sarge Frye Field • Columbia, SC	**L** 5–8	37–17	
May 13	Charlotte*	Beautiful Tiger Field • Clemson, SC	**W** 12–5	38–17	

Postseason

ACC Tournament
Date	Opponent	Rank	Site/stadium	Score	Overall record	ACCT Record
May 15	(6) Duke	(5)	Greenville Municipal Stadium • Greenville, SC	**W** 4–2	39–17	1–0
May 16	(3) Florida State	(5)	Greenville Municipal Stadium • Greenville, SC	**W** 6–1	40–17	2–0
May 17	(1) Georgia Tech	(5)	Greenville Municipal Stadium • Greenville, SC	**W** 9–8	41–17	3–0
May 18	(4) North Carolina	(5)	Greenville Municipal Stadium • Greenville, SC	**W** 7–4	42–17	4–0
May 18	(3) Florida State	(5)	Greenville Municipal Stadium • Greenville, SC	**L** 5–7	42–18	4–1
May 19	(2) NC State	(5)	Greenville Municipal Stadium • Greenville, SC	**W** 11–7	43–18	5–1

NCAA Mideast Regional
Date	Opponent	Rank	Site/stadium	Score	Overall record	Regional Record
May 28	(5) Rutgers	(2)	Lindsey Nelson Stadium • Knoxville, TN	**W** 7–3	44–18	1–0
May 29	(4) Fresno State	(2)	Lindsey Nelson Stadium • Knoxville, TN	**W** 10–3	45–18	2–0
May 30	(4) Fresno State	(2)	Lindsey Nelson Stadium • Knoxville, TN	**L** 4–11	45–19	2–1
May 31	(3) Kansas	(2)	Lindsey Nelson Stadium • Knoxville, TN	**L** 1–9	45–20	2–2

== 1994 ==
1994 Clemson Tigers baseball

Atlantic Coast Conference champions ACC Tournament champions

East Regional, 2–2
- Conference: Atlantic Coast Conference

Ranking
- Coaches: No. 9
- CB: No. 9
- Record: 57–18 (20–4 ACC)
- Head coach: Jack Leggett (1st season)
- Assistant coaches: Tim Corbin (1st season); John Pawlowski (1st season); Gregg Kilby (1st season)
- Home stadium: Beautiful Tiger Field

1994 Atlantic Coast Conference baseball standings
	Conf.				Overall
Team	W		L	PCT	W		L	PCT
No. 9 Clemson ‍†‍‡‍^{y}	20	–	4	.833	57	–	18	.760
No. 2 Georgia Tech ‍‍‍^{y}	16	–	8	.667	50	–	17	.746
Duke ‍‍‍	16	–	8	.667	33	–	20	.623
No. 6 Florida State ‍‍‍^{y}	14	–	9	.609	53	–	22	.707
NC State ‍‍‍^{y}	13	–	11	.542	46	–	18	.719
North Carolina ‍‍‍	10	–	13	.435	34	–	21	.618
Wake Forest ‍‍‍	10	–	14	.417	37	–	20	.649
Maryland ‍‍‍	6	–	18	.250	24	–	30	.444
Virginia ‍‍‍	2	–	22	.083	20	–	34	.370
† – Conference champion ‡ – Tournament champion y – Invited to the NCAA tournament As of June 30, 1994; Rankings from Collegiate Baseball

=== Roster ===
1994 Clemson Tigers roster
- Will Duffie; - Jamie Eggleston; - Mike Holtz; - Jeff Keppen; - Brian Matz; - Jeff Sauve; - Bryan Schroeder; - Brodie Smith; - Mark Watson; - Rodney Williams	**Pitchers**: - Kris Benson; - Jason Dawsey; - Billy Koch; - Andy Taulbee; - Ken Vining; - Scott Winchester	**Catchers**: - Mike Eydenberg; **Infielders**: - Seth Brizek; - Eric DeMoura; - Jason Embler; - Mike Hampton	**Outfielders**: - Gary Burnham; - Dexter McLeon; - David Miller; - Shane Monahan; **Utility/Designated Hitter**: - Andy Monin

=== Schedule ===
Legend
	Clemson win
	Clemson loss
**Bold**	Clemson team member
*	Non-Conference game
Ranks from Collegiate Baseball, tournament seeds in parentheses.

1994 Clemson Tigers baseball game log
Regular season

February
Date	Opponent	Site/stadium	Score	Overall record	ACC record
Feb 12	Western Carolina*	Beautiful Tiger Field • Clemson, SC	**W** 3–1	1–0	
Feb 12	Western Carolina*	Beautiful Tiger Field • Clemson, SC	**W** 4–1	2–0	
Feb 13	Western Carolina*	Beautiful Tiger Field • Clemson, SC	**W** 6–5^{13}	3–0	
Feb 19	Tennessee*	Beautiful Tiger Field • Clemson, SC	**W** 14–1	4–0	
Feb 20	Tennessee*	Beautiful Tiger Field • Clemson, SC	**W** 4–2	5–0	
Feb 24	vs Fresno State*	Earl Wilson Stadium • Paradise, NV	**L** 5–11	5–1	
Feb 24	at UNLV*	Earl Wilson Stadium • Paradise, NV	**W** 11–6	6–1	
Feb 25	vs Rice*	Earl Wilson Stadium • Paradise, NV	**W** 13–3	7–1	
Feb 26	vs Rice*	Earl Wilson Stadium • Paradise, NV	**L** 3–12	7–2	
Feb 27	vs Fresno State*	Earl Wilson Stadium • Paradise, NV	**W** 13–8^{10}	8–2	

March
Date	Opponent	Site/stadium	Score	Overall record	ACC record
Mar 3	Furman*	Beautiful Tiger Field • Clemson, SC	**W** 11–4	9–2	
Mar 4	Wake Forest	Beautiful Tiger Field • Clemson, SC	**W** 5–4	10–2	1–0
Mar 5	Wake Forest	Beautiful Tiger Field • Clemson, SC	**W** 5–4	11–2	2–0
Mar 6	Wake Forest	Beautiful Tiger Field • Clemson, SC	**W** 8–6	12–2	3–0
Mar 7	UNC Wilmington*	Beautiful Tiger Field • Clemson, SC	**W** 14–2	13–2	
Mar 8	UNC Wilmington*	Beautiful Tiger Field • Clemson, SC	**W** 8–7^{13}	14–2	
Mar 9	at Georgia*	Foley Field • Athens, GA	**W** 9–2	15–2	
Mar 11	Maryland	Beautiful Tiger Field • Clemson, SC	**W** 7–5	16–2	4–0
Mar 12	Maryland	Beautiful Tiger Field • Clemson, SC	**W** 18–2	17–2	5–0
Mar 13	Maryland	Beautiful Tiger Field • Clemson, SC	**W** 6–5	18–2	6–0
Mar 15	New Hampshire*	Beautiful Tiger Field • Clemson, SC	**W** 4–1	19–2	
Mar 16	South Carolina*	Beautiful Tiger Field • Clemson, SC	**L** 4–7	19–3	
Mar 18	at Hawaii–Hilo*	Wong Stadium • Hilo, HI	**W** 6–1	20–3	
Mar 19	at Hawaii–Hilo*	Wong Stadium • Hilo, HI	**W** 13–5	21–3	
Mar 19	at Hawaii–Hilo*	Wong Stadium • Hilo, HI	**W** 10–3	22–3	
Mar 21	vs Oregon State*	Rainbow Stadium • Honolulu, HI	**L** 2–9	22–4	
Mar 22	vs Lewis–Clark State*	Rainbow Stadium • Honolulu, HI	**L** 2–9	22–5	
Mar 23	at Hawaii*	Rainbow Stadium • Honolulu, HI	**W** 7–3	23–5	
Mar 25	vs Washington*	Rainbow Stadium • Honolulu, HI	**W** 3–2^{7}	24–5	
Mar 25	vs Grand Canyon*	Rainbow Stadium • Honolulu, HI	**W** 3–1^{7}	25–5	
Mar 26	vs Washington*	Rainbow Stadium • Honolulu, HI	**L** 1–2^{11}	25–6	
Mar 27	vs Grand Canyon*	Rainbow Stadium • Honolulu, HI	**W** 9–0	26–6	
Mar 29	Georgia Southern*	Beautiful Tiger Field • Clemson, SC	**W** 7–5	27–6	
Mar 30	Georgia Southern*	Beautiful Tiger Field • Clemson, SC	**L** 2–3	27–7	

April
Date	Opponent	Site/stadium	Score	Overall record	ACC record
Apr 1	at Virginia	UVA Baseball Field • Charlottesville, VA	**W** 3–2	28–7	7–0
Apr 2	at Virginia	UVA Baseball Field • Charlottesville, VA	**W** 11–6	29–7	8–0
Apr 3	at Virginia	UVA Baseball Field • Charlottesville, VA	**W** 11–4	30–7	9–0
Apr 5	Georgia*	Beautiful Tiger Field • Clemson, SC	**W** 6–3	31–7	
Apr 6	at South Carolina*	Sarge Frye Field • Columbia, SC	**W** 7–2	32–7	
Apr 8	NC State	Beautiful Tiger Field • Clemson, SC	**W** 10–8^{10}	33–7	10–0
Apr 9	NC State	Beautiful Tiger Field • Clemson, SC	**W** 9–5	34–7	11–0
Apr 10	NC State	Beautiful Tiger Field • Clemson, SC	**W** 6–5^{10}	35–7	12–0
Apr 12	Appalachian State*	Beautiful Tiger Field • Clemson, SC	**W** 8–2	36–7	
Apr 13	at South Carolina*	Sarge Frye Field • Columbia, SC	**L** 4–^{17}	36–8	
Apr 15	at Duke	Jack Coombs Field • Durham, NC	**W** 7–6	37–8	13–0
Apr 16	at Duke	Jack Coombs Field • Durham, NC	**L** 7–8	37–9	13–1
Apr 17	at Duke	Jack Coombs Field • Durham, NC	**W** 7–0	38–9	14–1
Apr 18	Charleston Southern*	Beautiful Tiger Field • Clemson, SC	**W** 16–6	39–9	
Apr 19	at Georgia*	Foley Field • Athens, GA	**W** 10–6	40–9	
Apr 20	South Carolina*	Beautiful Tiger Field • Clemson, SC	**L** 3–4	40–10	
Apr 22	at North Carolina	Boshamer Stadium • Chapel Hill, NC	**W** 11–1	41–10	15–1
Apr 23	at North Carolina	Boshamer Stadium • Chapel Hill, NC	**L** 0–5	41–11	15–2
Apr 24	at North Carolina	Boshamer Stadium • Chapel Hill, NC	**W** 3–2	42–11	16–2
Apr 26	at Tennessee*	Lindsey Nelson Stadium • Knoxville, TN	**W** 3–2	43–11	
Apr 27	at Tennessee*	Lindsey Nelson Stadium • Knoxville, TN	**L** 1–5^{10}	43–12	
Apr 29	Miami (FL)*	Beautiful Tiger Field • Clemson, SC	**W** 7–5	44–12	
Apr 30	Miami (FL)*	Beautiful Tiger Field • Clemson, SC	**L** 3–6	44–13	

May
Date	Opponent	Site/stadium	Score	Overall record	ACC record
May 1	Miami (FL)*	Beautiful Tiger Field • Clemson, SC	**W** 9–8^{12}	45–13	
May 7	Florida State	Beautiful Tiger Field • Clemson, SC	**W** 5–2	46–13	17–2
May 8	Florida State	Beautiful Tiger Field • Clemson, SC	**W** 9–5	47–13	18–2
May 9	Florida State	Beautiful Tiger Field • Clemson, SC	**L** 3–8	47–14	18–3
May 10	at Coastal Carolina*	Charles Watson Stadium • Conway, SC	**W** 9–7	48–14	
May 11	at Coastal Carolina*	Charles Watson Stadium • Conway, SC	**W** 8–0	49–14	
May 13	at Georgia Tech	Russ Chandler Stadium • Atlanta, GA	**W** 9–8^{10}	50–14	19–3
May 14	at Georgia Tech	Russ Chandler Stadium • Atlanta, GA	**L** 4–20	50–15	19–4
May 15	at Georgia Tech	Russ Chandler Stadium • Atlanta, GA	**W** 7–4	51–15	20–4

Postseason

ACC Tournament
Date	Opponent	Rank	Site/stadium	Score	Overall record	ACCT Record
May 18	(8) Maryland	(1)	Greenville Municipal Stadium • Greenville, SC	**W** 7–1	52–15	1–0
May 19	(5) NC State	(1)	Greenville Municipal Stadium • Greenville, SC	**W** 17–5	53–15	2–0
May 20	(3) Georgia Tech	(1)	Greenville Municipal Stadium • Greenville, SC	**W** 9–6	54–15	3–0
May 21	(4) Florida State	(1)	Greenville Municipal Stadium • Greenville, SC	**L** 4–10	54–16	3–1
May 22	(4) Florida State	(1)	Greenville Municipal Stadium • Greenville, SC	**W** 4–1	55–16	4–1

NCAA East Regional
Date	Opponent	Rank	Site/stadium	Score	Overall record	Regional Record
May 26	(6) The Citadel	(1)	Beautiful Tiger Field • Clemson, SC	**W** 5–1	56–16	1–0
May 27	(4) Notre Dame	(1)	Beautiful Tiger Field • Clemson, SC	**L** 1–8	56–17	1–1
May 28	(3) Old Dominion	(1)	Beautiful Tiger Field • Clemson, SC	**W** 6–1	57–17	2–1
May 28	(2) Auburn	(1)	Beautiful Tiger Field • Clemson, SC	**L** 5–11	57–18	2–2

== 1997 ==
1997 Clemson Tigers baseball

Central Regional, 1–2
- Conference: Atlantic Coast Conference

Ranking
- Coaches: No. 24
- Record: 41–23 (13–10 ACC)
- Head coach: Jack Leggett (4th season)
- Assistant coaches: Tim Corbin (4th season); John Pawlowski (4th season); Kevin Erminio (2nd season)
- Home stadium: Beautiful Tiger Field

1997 Atlantic Coast Conference baseball standings
	Conf.				Overall
Team	W		L	PCT	W		L	PCT
No. 10 Georgia Tech ‍†‍‍^{y}	19	–	4	.826	46	–	15	.754
No. 9 Florida State ‍‍‡‍^{y}	18	–	6	.750	50	–	17	.746
No. 23 NC State ‍‍‍^{y}	15	–	8	.652	43	–	20	.683
Clemson ‍‍‍^{y}	13	–	10	.565	41	–	23	.641
Wake Forest ‍‍‍	10	–	13	.435	37	–	20	.649
Virginia ‍‍‍	10	–	13	.435	32	–	22	.593
Duke ‍‍‍	9	–	14	.391	33	–	25	.569
North Carolina ‍‍‍	6	–	18	.250	29	–	31	.483
Maryland ‍‍‍	5	–	19	.208	22	–	32	.407
† – Conference champion ‡ – Tournament champion y – Invited to the NCAA tournament As of June 30, 1997; Rankings from Collegiate Baseball

=== Roster ===
1997 Clemson Tigers roster
- Matt Additon; - Derek Bogert; - Scott Hauser; - Bradley LeCroy; - Ontrell McCray; - Jeff Parsons; - Bryan Schroeder; - Ray Scott; - Adam Spires	**Pitchers**: - Brian Adams; - Skip Browning; - Scott Clackum; - Pat Collins; - Ryan Mottl; - Mike Paradis; - Matt White	**Catchers**: - Brian Ellis; - Matthew LeCroy; **Infielders**: - Kurt Bultman; - Eric DeMoura; - Jason Embler; - Brian Holstad	**Outfielders**: - Nathan Broome; - Gary Burnham; - Matt Padgett; **Utility/Designated Hitter**: - Henri Stanley

=== Schedule ===
Legend
	Clemson win
	Clemson loss
**Bold**	Clemson team member
*	Non-Conference game
Ranks from Collegiate Baseball, tournament seeds in parentheses.

1997 Clemson Tigers baseball game log
Regular season

February
Date	Opponent	Site/stadium	Score	Overall record	ACC record
Feb 15	Morehead State*	Beautiful Tiger Field • Clemson, SC	**W** 6–2	1–0	
Feb 15	Morehead State*	Beautiful Tiger Field • Clemson, SC	**W** 9–1	2–0	
Feb 16	Morehead State*	Beautiful Tiger Field • Clemson, SC	**W** 1–0	3–0	
Feb 18	Charleston Southern*	Beautiful Tiger Field • Clemson, SC	**W** 7–2	4–0	
Feb 22	Kentucky*	Beautiful Tiger Field • Clemson, SC	**W** 7–6	5–0	
Feb 22	Kentucky*	Beautiful Tiger Field • Clemson, SC	**W** 4–3	6–0	
Feb 23	Kentucky*	Beautiful Tiger Field • Clemson, SC	**W** 10–3	7–0	
Feb 27	vs Cal State Northridge*	Earl Wilson Stadium • Paradise, NV	**W** 8–7	8–0	
Feb 28	vs Northwestern*	Earl Wilson Stadium • Paradise, NV	**W** 12–7	9–0	
Feb 28	at UNLV*	Earl Wilson Stadium • Paradise, NV	**L** 3–4	9–1	

March
Date	Opponent	Site/stadium	Score	Overall record	ACC record
Mar 1	vs Northwestern*	Earl Wilson Stadium • Paradise, NV	**W** 10–2	10–1	
Mar 2	vs Cal State Northridge*	Earl Wilson Stadium • Paradise, NV	**L** 5–18	10–2	
Mar 4	James Madison*	Beautiful Tiger Field • Clemson, SC	**W** 12–5	11–2	
Mar 5	James Madison*	Beautiful Tiger Field • Clemson, SC	**W** 11–3	12–2	
Mar 7	Coastal Carolina*	Beautiful Tiger Field • Clemson, SC	**W** 17–2	13–2	
Mar 8	Coastal Carolina*	Beautiful Tiger Field • Clemson, SC	**W** 17–2	14–2	
Mar 9	Coastal Carolina*	Beautiful Tiger Field • Clemson, SC	**W** 13–3	15–2	
Mar 12	Appalachian State*	Beautiful Tiger Field • Clemson, SC	**W** 17–4	16–2	
Mar 14	Virginia	Beautiful Tiger Field • Clemson, SC	**W** 3–2	17–2	1–0
Mar 15	Virginia	Beautiful Tiger Field • Clemson, SC	**W** 6–1	18–2	2–0
Mar 16	Virginia	Beautiful Tiger Field • Clemson, SC	**W** 7–3	19–2	3–0
Mar 19	at Tennessee*	Lindsey Nelson Stadium • Knoxville, TN	**L** 3–7	19–3	
Mar 21	at Maryland	Shipley Field • College Park, MD	**L** 1–13	19–4	3–1
Mar 22	at Maryland	Shipley Field • College Park, MD	**W** 17–10	20–4	4–1
Mar 23	at Maryland	Shipley Field • College Park, MD	**L** 6–7^{10}	20–5	4–2
Mar 25	at Western Carolina*	Hennon Stadium • Cullowhee, NC	**L** 4–9	20–6	
Mar 26	Western Carolina*	Beautiful Tiger Field • Clemson, SC	**W** 14–9	21–6	
Mar 28	at Wake Forest	Gene Hooks Stadium • Winston-Salem, NC	**L** 2–11	21–7	4–3
Mar 29	at Wake Forest	Gene Hooks Stadium • Winston-Salem, NC	**W** 10–9	22–7	5–3
Mar 30	at Wake Forest	Gene Hooks Stadium • Winston-Salem, NC	**W** 18–7	23–7	6–3

April
Date	Opponent	Site/stadium	Score	Overall record	ACC record
Apr 1	at Georgia*	Foley Field • Athens, GA	**L** 2–3	23–8	
Apr 2	South Carolina*	Beautiful Tiger Field • Clemson, SC	**L** 3–11	23–9	
Apr 4	at Florida State	Dick Howser Stadium • Tallahassee, FL	**W** 10–7	24–9	7–3
Apr 5	at Florida State	Dick Howser Stadium • Tallahassee, FL	**L** 5–0	24–10	7–4
Apr 6	at Florida State	Dick Howser Stadium • Tallahassee, FL	**L** 10–11^{12}	24–11	7–5
Apr 8	Furman*	Beautiful Tiger Field • Clemson, SC	**W** 10–7	25–11	
Apr 9	at South Carolina*	Sarge Frye Field • Columbia, SC	**W** 15–1	26–11	
Apr 11	Duke	Beautiful Tiger Field • Clemson, SC	**W** 11–1	27–11	8–5
Apr 12	Duke	Beautiful Tiger Field • Clemson, SC	**L** 3–4^{10}	27–12	8–6
Apr 13	Duke	Beautiful Tiger Field • Clemson, SC	**W** 14–2	28–12	9–6
Apr 15	Tennessee*	Beautiful Tiger Field • Clemson, SC	**W** 13–5	29–12	
Apr 16	South Carolina*	Beautiful Tiger Field • Clemson, SC	**W** 12–9	30–12	
Apr 18	at NC State	Doak Field • Raleigh, NC	**L** 9–16	30–13	9–7
Apr 19	at NC State	Doak Field • Raleigh, NC	**L** 4–17	30–14	9–8
Apr 20	at NC State	Doak Field • Raleigh, NC	**L** 7–9	30–15	9–9
Apr 23	at South Carolina*	Sarge Frye Field • Columbia, SC	**L** 16–38	30–16	
Apr 25	Georgia Tech	Beautiful Tiger Field • Clemson, SC	**W** 7–4	31–16	10–9
Apr 26	Georgia Tech	Beautiful Tiger Field • Clemson, SC	**L** 4–19	31–17	10–10

May
Date	Opponent	Site/stadium	Score	Overall record	ACC record
May 2	at Davidson*	Wildcat Park • Davidson, NC	**W** 11–4	32–17	
May 4	North Carolina	Beautiful Tiger Field • Clemson, SC	**W** 17–2	33–17	11–10
May 5	North Carolina	Beautiful Tiger Field • Clemson, SC	**W** 11–10	34–17	12–10
May 6	North Carolina	Beautiful Tiger Field • Clemson, SC	**W** 5–4	35–17	13–10
May 7	Charleston Southern*	Beautiful Tiger Field • Clemson, SC	**W** 9–8	36–17	
May 9	California*	Beautiful Tiger Field • Clemson, SC	**L** 11–12	36–18	
May 10	California*	Beautiful Tiger Field • Clemson, SC	**W** 15–3	37–18	
May 11	California*	Beautiful Tiger Field • Clemson, SC	**L** 10–12	37–19	

Postseason

ACC Tournament
Date	Opponent	Rank	Site/stadium	Score	Overall record	ACCT Record
May 14	(5) Wake Forest	(4)	Florida Power Park • St. Petersburg, FL	**W** 8–6	38–19	1–0
May 15	(1) Georgia Tech	(4)	Florida Power Park • St. Petersburg, FL	**W** 7–5	39–19	2–0
May 16	(2) Florida State	(4)	Florida Power Park • St. Petersburg, FL	**L** 4–8	39–20	2–1
May 17	(3) NC State	(4)	Florida Power Park • St. Petersburg, FL	**W** 11–6^{10}	40–20	3–1
May 17	(2) Florida State	(4)	Florida Power Park • St. Petersburg, FL	**L** 0–10	40–21	3–2

NCAA Central Regional
Date	Opponent	Rank	Site/stadium	Score	Overall record	Regional Record
May 22	(4) Nevada	(3)	Dan Law Field • Lubbock, TX	**W** 13–9	41–21	1–0
May 23	(2) Rice	(3)	Dan Law Field • Lubbock, TX	**L** 6–10	41–22	1–1
May 24	(6) Southwest Texas State	(3)	Dan Law Field • Lubbock, TX	**L** 7–12	41–23	1–2

== 1998 ==
1998 Clemson Tigers baseball

East Regional at Clemson, SC, 1–2
- Conference: Atlantic Coast Conference

Ranking
- Coaches: No. 21
- CB: No. 23
- Record: 43–16 (14–9 ACC)
- Head coach: Jack Leggett (5th season)
- Assistant coaches: Tim Corbin (5th season); John Pawlowski (5th season); Kevin Erminio (3rd season)
- Home stadium: Beautiful Tiger Field

1998 Atlantic Coast Conference baseball standings
	Conf.				Overall
Team	W		L	PCT	W		L	PCT
No. 8 Florida State ‍†‍‍^{y}	18	–	4	.818	53	–	20	.726
No. 15 Georgia Tech ‍‍‍^{y}	14	–	9	.609	41	–	22	.651
No. 23 Clemson ‍‍‍^{y}	14	–	9	.609	43	–	16	.729
NC State ‍‍‍^{y}	12	–	9	.571	39	–	21	.650
No. 27 Wake Forest ‍‍‡‍^{y}	13	–	10	.565	43	–	23	.652
No. 18 North Carolina ‍‍‍^{y}	13	–	10	.565	42	–	23	.646
Duke ‍‍‍	8	–	15	.348	38	–	20	.655
Maryland ‍‍‍	5	–	18	.217	26	–	30	.464
Virginia ‍‍‍	5	–	18	.217	28	–	26	.519
† – Conference champion ‡ – Tournament champion y – Invited to the NCAA tournament As of June 30, 1998; Rankings from Collegiate Baseball

=== Roster ===
1998 Clemson Tigers roster
- Darren Adams; - Matt Additon; - Derek Bogert; - Mike Calitri; - Bradley LeCroy; - Mike Proto; - Mike Rhue; - Casey Stone; - Jeff Vessell	**Pitchers**: - Brian Adams; - Skip Browning; - Scott Clackum; - Ryan Mottl; - Mike Paradis; - Matt White	**Catchers**: - Brian Ellis; **Infielders**: - Kurt Bultman; - Jason Harris; - Doug Roper; - Justin Singleton	**Outfielders**: - Patrick Boyd; - Peter Nystrom; - Matt Padgett; **Utility/Designated Hitter**: - Henri Stanley

=== Schedule ===
Legend
	Clemson win
	Clemson loss
**Bold**	Clemson team member
*	Non-Conference game
Ranks from Collegiate Baseball, tournament seeds in parentheses.

1998 Clemson Tigers baseball game log
Regular season

February
Date	Opponent	Rank	Site/stadium	Score	Overall record	ACC record
Feb 6	vs South Florida*		Osceola County Stadium • Kissimmee, FL	**W** 4–2	1–0	
Feb 7	vs UCF*		Osceola County Stadium • Kissimmee, FL	**W** 7–6	2–0	
Feb 8	vs Auburn*		Osceola County Stadium • Kissimmee, FL	**W** 9–4	3–0	
Feb 13	East Carolina*		Beautiful Tiger Field • Clemson, SC	**L** 1–6	3–1	
Feb 14	East Carolina*		Beautiful Tiger Field • Clemson, SC	**W** 16–4	4–1	
Feb 15	East Carolina*		Beautiful Tiger Field • Clemson, SC	**W** 8–2	5–1	
Feb 20	Old Dominion*		Beautiful Tiger Field • Clemson, SC	**W** 5–4	6–1	
Feb 21	Old Dominion*		Beautiful Tiger Field • Clemson, SC	**W** 11–10	7–1	
Feb 22	Old Dominion*		Beautiful Tiger Field • Clemson, SC	**W** 12–7	8–1	
Feb 26	Charlotte*		Beautiful Tiger Field • Clemson, SC	**W** 11–7	9–1	
Feb 27	UNC Wilmington*		Beautiful Tiger Field • Clemson, SC	**W** 13–0	10–1	
Feb 28	UNC Wilmington*		Beautiful Tiger Field Stadium • Clemson, SC	**W** 19–6	11–1	

March
Date	Opponent	Rank	Site/stadium	Score	Overall record	ACC record
Mar 1	UNC Wilmington*		Beautiful Tiger Field • Clemson, SC	**W** 6–3	12–1	
Mar 3	Florida Atlantic*		Beautiful Tiger Field • Clemson, SC	**W** 6–5	13–1	
Mar 4	Florida Atlantic*		Beautiful Tiger Field • Clemson, SC	**L** 5–6	13–2	
Mar 6	Stetson*		Beautiful Tiger Field • Clemson, SC	**W** 22–4	14–2	
Mar 8	Stetson*		Beautiful Tiger Field • Clemson, SC	**W** 10–5	15–2	
Mar 8	Stetson*		Beautiful Tiger Field • Clemson, SC	**W** 9–4^{8}	16–2	
Mar 10	Coastal Carolina*		Beautiful Tiger Field • Clemson, SC	**W** 17–3	17–2	
Mar 13	Maine*		Beautiful Tiger Field • Clemson, SC	**W** 12–2	18–2	
Mar 14	Maine*		Beautiful Tiger Field • Clemson, SC	**W** 18–2	19–2	
Mar 14	Maine*		Beautiful Tiger Field • Clemson, SC	**W** 19–11	20–2	
Mar 17	Western Carolina*		Beautiful Tiger Field • Clemson, SC	**W** 5–1	21–2	
Mar 19	at Western Carolina*		Hennon Stadium • Cullowhee, NC	**L** 7–10	21–3	
Mar 20	Maryland		Beautiful Tiger Field • Clemson, SC	**W** 5–3	22–3	1–0
Mar 21	Maryland		Beautiful Tiger Field • Clemson, SC	**W** 5–3	23–3	2–0
Mar 22	Maryland		Beautiful Tiger Field • Clemson, SC	**W** 19–6	24–3	3–0
Mar 25	The Citadel*		Beautiful Tiger Field • Clemson, SC	**W** 5–0	25–3	
Mar 27	Wake Forest		Beautiful Tiger Field • Clemson, SC	**W** 10–2	26–3	4–0
Mar 28	Wake Forest		Beautiful Tiger Field • Clemson, SC	**W** 6–5	27–3	5–0
Mar 29	Wake Forest		Beautiful Tiger Field • Clemson, SC	**L** 2–8	27–4	5–1
Mar 31	Georgia*		Beautiful Tiger Field • Clemson, SC	**W** 5–4^{10}	28–4	

April
Date	Opponent	Rank	Site/stadium	Score	Overall record	ACC record
Apr 1	at South Carolina*		Sarge Frye Field • Columbia, SC	**W** 6–4	29–4	
Apr 3	at Virginia		UVA Baseball Field • Charlottesville, VA	**W** 9–7	30–4	6–1
Apr 4	at Virginia		UVA Baseball Field • Charlottesville, VA	**L** 6–7	30–5	6–2
Apr 5	at Virginia		UVA Baseball Field • Charlottesville, VA	**W** 15–6	31–5	7–2
Apr 7	Furman*		Beautiful Tiger Field • Clemson, SC	**W** 18–0	32–5	
Apr 8	Charleston Southern*		Beautiful Tiger Field • Clemson, SC	**W** 13–3	33–5	
Apr 11	at Duke		Jack Coombs Field • Durham, NC	**W** 8–2	34–5	8–2
Apr 11	at Duke		Jack Coombs Field • Durham, NC	**L** 6–7	34–6	8–3
Apr 12	at Duke		Jack Coombs Field • Durham, NC	**L** 2–6	34–7	8–4
Apr 15	UNC Asheville*		Beautiful Tiger Field • Clemson, SC	**W** 14–6	35–7	
Apr 17	NC State		Beautiful Tiger Field • Clemson, SC	**W** 11–10^{12}	36–7	9–4
Apr 18	NC State		Beautiful Tiger Field • Clemson, SC	**W** 17–6	37–7	10–4
Apr 22	at Georgia*		Foley Field • Athens, GA	**W** 9–2	38–7	
Apr 24	Florida State		Beautiful Tiger Field • Clemson, SC	**W** 2–1	39–7	11–4
Apr 25	Florida State		Beautiful Tiger Field • Clemson, SC	**W** 5–4	40–7	12–4
Apr 26	Florida State		Beautiful Tiger Field • Clemson, SC	**L** 2–7	40–8	12–5

May
Date	Opponent	Rank	Site/stadium	Score	Overall record	ACC record
May 3	at Georgia Tech	No. 7	Russ Chandler Stadium • Atlanta, GA	**L** 6–7	40–9	12–6
May 4	at Georgia Tech	No. 10	Russ Chandler Stadium • Atlanta, GA	**L** 7–9	40–10	12–7
May 5	at Georgia Tech	No. 10	Russ Chandler Stadium • Atlanta, GA	**L** 5–14	40–11	12–8
May 9	at North Carolina	No. 10	Boshamer Stadium • Chapel Hill, NC	**L** 9–12	40–12	12–9
May 9	at North Carolina	No. 10	Boshamer Stadium • Chapel Hill, NC	**W** 8–1	41–12	13–9
May 10	at North Carolina	No. 10	Boshamer Stadium • Chapel Hill, NC	**W** 7–6	42–12	14–9

Postseason

ACC Tournament
Date	Opponent	Rank	Site/stadium	Score	Overall record	ACCT Record
May 13	(6) North Carolina	No. 18 (3)	Durham Bulls Athletic Park • Durham, NC	**L** 1–4	42–13	0–1
May 14	No. 15 (2) Georgia Tech	No. 18 (3)	Durham Bulls Athletic Park • Durham, NC	**L** 6–10	42–14	0–2

NCAA East Regional
Date	Opponent	Rank	Site/stadium	Score	Overall record	Regional Record
May 21	(5) The Citadel	No. 18 (2)	Beautiful Tiger Field Stadium • Clemson, SC	**W** 12–3	43–14	1–0
May 22	(4) South Alabama	No. 18 (2)	Beautiful Tiger Field • Clemson, SC	**L** 1–2	43–15	1–1
May 23	No. 6 (1) Southern California	No. 18 (2)	Beautiful Tiger Field • Clemson, SC	**L** 5–8	43–16	1–2

=== Ranking movements ===
Ranking movements Legend: ██ Increase in ranking ██ Decrease in ranking
	Week					
Poll	1	2	3	4	5	Final
Coaches' Poll	Not released					21
Baseball America	Not released					21
Collegiate Baseball	7	10	18	18	23	23

== 1999 ==
1999 Clemson Tigers baseball

Fayetteville Regional champions

College Station Super Regional, 1–2
- Conference: Atlantic Coast Conference

Ranking
- Coaches: No. 14
- CB: No. 13
- Record: 42–27 (13–10 ACC)
- Head coach: Jack Leggett (6th season)
- Assistant coaches: Tim Corbin (6th season); Kevin O'Sullivan (1st season); Mike Hampton (1st season)
- Home stadium: Beautiful Tiger Field

1999 Atlantic Coast Conference baseball standings
	Conf.				Overall
Team	W		L	PCT	W		L	PCT
No. 2 Florida State ‍†‍‍^{y}	22	–	2	.917	57	–	14	.803
No. 10 Wake Forest ‍‍‡‍^{y}	16	–	7	.696	47	–	16	.746
No. 13 Clemson ‍‍‍^{y}	13	–	10	.565	42	–	27	.609
No. 28 North Carolina ‍‍‍^{y}	13	–	11	.542	41	–	18	.695
Georgia Tech ‍‍‍	12	–	12	.500	38	–	20	.655
NC State ‍‍‍^{y}	11	–	13	.458	37	–	25	.597
Virginia ‍‍‍	8	–	15	.348	21	–	35	.375
Maryland ‍‍‍	6	–	17	.261	23	–	33	.411
Duke ‍‍‍	4	–	18	.182	24	–	31	.436
† – Conference champion ‡ – Tournament champion y – Invited to the NCAA tournament As of June 30, 1999; Rankings from Collegiate Baseball

=== Roster ===
1999 Clemson Tigers roster
- Brian Adams; - Matt Additon; - Thomas Boozer; - Derek Bogert; - Skip Browning; - Mike Calitri; - Brandt Cook; - Jesse Douglass; - Kyle Frank; - Chris Heck; - Jeff Kane; - Justin Lombardi; - Mike Proto; - Joe Don Reames; - Doug Roper; - Casey Stone	**Pitchers**: - Matt Henrie; - Ryan Mottl; - Mike Paradis; - Steve Reba	**Catchers**: - Brian Ellis; **Infielders**: - Kurt Bultman; - Khalil Greene; - Jason Harris; - Bradley LeCroy	**Outfielders**: - Patrick Boyd; - Justin Singleton; - Henri Stanley

=== Schedule ===
Legend
	Clemson win
	Clemson loss
**Bold**	Clemson team member
*	Non-Conference game
Ranks from Collegiate Baseball, tournament seeds in parentheses.

1999 Clemson Tigers baseball game log
Regular season

February
Date	Opponent	Rank	Site/stadium	Score	Overall record	ACC record
Feb 12	Kansas State*	No. 22	Beautiful Tiger Field • Clemson, SC	**W** 10–7	1–0	
Feb 13	Kansas State*	No. 22	Beautiful Tiger Field • Clemson, SC	**W** 10–4	2–0	
Feb 14	Kansas State*	No. 22	Beautiful Tiger Field • Clemson, SC	**W** 11–3	3–0	
Feb 25	vs No. 24 Washington*	No. 20	Earl Wilson Stadium • Paradise, NV	**W** 13–12	4–0	
Feb 26	vs Creighton*	No. 20	Earl Wilson Stadium • Paradise, NV	**L** 3–4	4–1	
Feb 26	at UNLV*	No. 20	Earl Wilson Stadium • Paradise, NV	**L** 11–12^{10}	4–2	
Feb 27	vs Nevada*	No. 20	Earl Wilson Stadium • Paradise, NV	**L** 5–7	4–3	
Feb 28	vs Creighton*	No. 20	Earl Wilson Stadium • Paradise, NV	**W** 13–10	5–3	

March
Date	Opponent	Rank	Site/stadium	Score	Overall record	ACC record
Mar 3	The Citadel*	No. 27	Beautiful Tiger Field • Clemson, SC	**L** 15–18	5–4	
Mar 5	Liberty*	No. 27	Beautiful Tiger Field • Clemson, SC	**L** 9–10	5–5	
Mar 6	Liberty*	No. 27	Beautiful Tiger Field • Clemson, SC	**L** 8–11	5–6	
Mar 6	Liberty*	No. 27	Beautiful Tiger Field • Clemson, SC	**W** 11–6	6–6	
Mar 10	Coastal Carolina*		Beautiful Tiger Field • Clemson, SC	**W** 14–6	7–6	
Mar 12	George Mason*		Beautiful Tiger Field • Clemson, SC	**W** 14–4	8–6	
Mar 13	George Mason*		Beautiful Tiger Field • Clemson, SC	**W** 13–2	9–6	
Mar 13	George Mason*		Beautiful Tiger Field • Clemson, SC	**W** 21–0	10–6	
Mar 16	at East Carolina*		Harrington Field • Greenville, NC	**L** 4–5	10–7	
Mar 17	at East Carolina*		Harrington Field • Greenville, NC	**L** 2–14	10–8	
Mar 19	at Maryland		Shipley Field • College Park, MD	**W** 8–6	11–8	1–0
Mar 20	at Maryland		Shipley Field • College Park, MD	**W** 9–2	12–8	2–0
Mar 23	Georgia*		Beautiful Tiger Field • Clemson, SC	**W** 17–5	13–8	
Mar 24	Wofford*		Beautiful Tiger Field • Clemson, SC	**W** 12–4	14–8	
Mar 26	at Wake Forest		Gene Hooks Stadium • Winston-Salem, NC	**L** 1–5	14–9	2–1
Mar 27	at Wake Forest		Gene Hooks Stadium • Winston-Salem, NC	**L** 6–11	14–10	2–2
Mar 28	at Wake Forest		Gene Hooks Stadium • Winston-Salem, NC	**L** 2–10	14–11	2–3
Mar 30	at Georgia*		Foley Field • Athens, GA	**W** 7–6	15–11	

April
Date	Opponent	Rank	Site/stadium	Score	Overall record	ACC record
Apr 1	East Tennessee State*		Beautiful Tiger Field • Clemson, SC	**W** 18–1	16–11	
Apr 2	vs No. 6 Miami (FL)*		Knights Stadium • Fort Mill, SC	**L** 3–5	16–12	
Apr 3	vs No. 6 Miami (FL)*		Knights Stadium • Fort Mill, SC	**W** 7–5	17–12	
Apr 4	vsNo. 6 Miami (FL)*		Knights Stadium • Fort Mill, SC	**L** 11–14	17–13	
Apr 6	at Western Carolina*		Hennon Stadium • Cullowhee, NC	**L** 8–9^{10}	17–14	
Apr 7	Western Carolina*		Beautiful Tiger Field • Clemson, SC	**W** 16–11	18–14	
Apr 9	at No. 1 Florida State		Dick Howser Stadium • Tallahassee, FL	**L** 0–8	18–15	2–4
Apr 10	at No. 1 Florida State		Dick Howser Stadium • Tallahassee, FL	**W** 8–4	19–15	3–4
Apr 11	at No. 1 Florida State		Dick Howser Stadium • Tallahassee, FL	**L** 3–5	19–16	3–5
Apr 13	Furman*		Beautiful Tiger Field • Clemson, SC	**W** 12–9	20–16	
Apr 14	at No. 27 South Carolina*		Sarge Frye Field • Columbia, SC	**W** 8–7	21–16	
Apr 16	Duke		Beautiful Tiger Field • Clemson, SC	**W** 18–1	22–16	4–5
Apr 17	Duke		Beautiful Tiger Field • Clemson, SC	**L** 3–5^{10}	22–17	4–6
Apr 18	Duke		Beautiful Tiger Field • Clemson, SC	**W** 7–5	23–17	5–6
Apr 21	No. 22 South Carolina*		Beautiful Tiger Field • Clemson, SC	**W** 5–4	24–17	
Apr 23	No. 19 Georgia Tech		Beautiful Tiger Field • Clemson, SC	**W** 24–4	25–17	6–6
Apr 24	No. 19 Georgia Tech		Beautiful Tiger Field • Clemson, SC	**W** 13–8	26–17	7–6
Apr 25	No. 19 Georgia Tech		Beautiful Tiger Field • Clemson, SC	**W** 6–5	27–17	8–6

May
Date	Opponent	Rank	Site/stadium	Score	Overall record	ACC record
May 1	Virginia	No. 23	Beautiful Tiger Field • Clemson, SC	**L** 3–9	27–18	8–7
May 1	Virginia	No. 23	Beautiful Tiger Field • Clemson, SC	**W** 5–4^{11}	28–18	9–7
May 2	Virginia	No. 23	Beautiful Tiger Field • Clemson, SC	**W** 12–5	29–18	10–7
May 4	Western Carolina*	No. 23	Beautiful Tiger Field • Clemson, SC	**W** 11–10^{10}	30–18	
May 7	Winthrop*	No. 23	Beautiful Tiger Field • Clemson, SC	**W** 14–2	31–18	
May 8	Coastal Carolina*	No. 23	Beautiful Tiger Field • Clemson, SC	**L** 2–4	31–19	
May 9	No. 10 North Carolina	No. 23	Beautiful Tiger Field • Clemson, SC	**W** 20–7	32–19	11–7
May 10	No. 14 North Carolina	No. 19	Beautiful Tiger Field • Clemson, SC	**W** 5–4	33–19	12–7
May 11	No. 14 North Carolina	No. 19	Beautiful Tiger Field • Clemson, SC	**L** 5–7	33–20	12–8
May 14	at NC State	No. 19	Doak Field • Raleigh, NC	**L** 9–19	33–21	12–9
May 15	at NC State	No. 19	Doak Field • Raleigh, NC	**L** 4–7	33–22	12–10
May 16	at NC State	No. 19	Doak Field • Raleigh, NC	**W** 7–4	34–22	13–10

Postseason

ACC Tournament
Date	Opponent	Rank	Site/stadium	Score	Overall record	ACCT Record
May 19	(6) NC State	No. 19 (3)	Durham Bulls Athletic Park • Durham, NC	**W** 7–6	35–22	1–0
May 20	No. 15 (2) Wake Forest	No. 19 (3)	Durham Bulls Athletic Park • Durham, NC	**L** 3–6	35–23	1–1
May 21	(8) Maryland	No. 19 (3)	Durham Bulls Athletic Park • Durham, NC	**W** 7–6	36–23	2–1
May 22	No. 2 (1) Florida State	No. 19 (3)	Durham Bulls Athletic Park • Durham, NC	**W** 8–7	37–23	3–1
May 22	No. 15 (2) Wake Forest	No. 19 (3)	Durham Bulls Athletic Park • Durham, NC	**L** 5–9	37–24	3–2

NCAA Fayetteville Regional
Date	Opponent	Rank	Site/stadium	Score	Overall record	Regional Record
May 28	(3) Southwest Missouri State	No. 16 (2)	Baum Stadium • Fayetteville, AR	**L** 5–23	37–25	0–1
May 29	(4) Delaware	No. 16 (2)	Baum Stadium • Fayetteville, AR	**W** 17–3	38–25	1–1
May 29	No. 8 (1) Arkansas	No. 16 (2)	Baum Stadium • Fayetteville, AR	**W** 12–4	39–25	2–1
May 30	(3) Southwest Missouri State	No. 16 (2)	Baum Stadium • Fayetteville, AR	**W** 8–7	40–25	3–1
May 30	(3) Southwest Missouri State	No. 16 (2)	Baum Stadium • Fayetteville, AR	**W** 7–5	41–25	4–1

NCAA College Station Super Regional
Date	Opponent	Rank	Site/stadium	Score	Overall record	SR Record
June 4	No. 6 (7) Texas A&M	No. 12	Olsen Field • College Station, TX	**L** 3–20	41–26	0–1
June 5	No. 6 (7) Texas A&M	No. 12	Olsen Field • College Station, TX	**W** 10–3	42–26	1–1
June 6	No. 6 (7) Texas A&M	No. 12	Olsen Field • College Station, TX	**L** 4–5	42–27	1–2

=== Ranking movements ===
Ranking movements Legend: ██ Increase in ranking ██ Decrease in ranking
	Week																			
Poll	Pre	1	2	3	4	5	6	7	8	9	10	11	12	13	14	15	16	17	18	Final
Coaches' Poll	Not released																			14
Baseball America	Not released																			17
Collegiate Baseball	20	22	20	20	27								23	23	19	19	16	12	13	13
