= 1994 ACC tournament =

1994 ACC tournament may refer to:

- 1994 ACC men's basketball tournament
- 1994 ACC women's basketball tournament
- 1994 ACC men's soccer tournament
- 1994 ACC women's soccer tournament
- 1994 Atlantic Coast Conference baseball tournament
- 1994 Atlantic Coast Conference softball tournament
