= 1990 ACC tournament =

1990 ACC tournament may refer to:

- 1990 ACC men's basketball tournament
- 1990 ACC women's basketball tournament
- 1990 ACC men's soccer tournament
- 1990 ACC women's soccer tournament
- 1990 Atlantic Coast Conference baseball tournament
