= 1993 ACC tournament =

1993 ACC tournament may refer to:

- 1993 ACC men's basketball tournament
- 1993 ACC women's basketball tournament
- 1993 ACC men's soccer tournament
- 1993 ACC women's soccer tournament
- 1993 Atlantic Coast Conference baseball tournament
- 1993 Atlantic Coast Conference softball tournament
