= 1997 ACC tournament =

1997 ACC tournament may refer to:

- 1997 ACC men's basketball tournament
- 1997 ACC women's basketball tournament
- 1997 ACC men's soccer tournament
- 1997 ACC women's soccer tournament
- 1997 Atlantic Coast Conference baseball tournament
- 1997 Atlantic Coast Conference softball tournament
