= Hartland Monahan =

Canadian ice hockey player (1951–2023)

- Born: March 31, 1951 Montreal, Quebec, Canada
- Died: December 9, 2023 (aged 72) Nashville, Tennessee, U.S.
- Height: 5 ft 11 in (180 cm)
- Weight: 170 lb (77 kg; 12 st 2 lb)
- Position: Right wing
- Shot: Right
- Played for: California Golden Seals; New York Rangers; Washington Capitals; Pittsburgh Penguins; Los Angeles Kings; St. Louis Blues
- NHL draft: 43rd overall, 1971; California Golden Seals
- Playing career: 1971–1981

Hartland Patrick Monahan (March 31, 1951 – December 9, 2023) was a Canadian professional ice hockey player. Monahan played 334 games in the National Hockey League (NHL).

Born in Montreal, Quebec, Monahan's father-in-law was the late Hall of Famer Bernie "Boom Boom" Geoffrion, and was the father of former Major League Baseball player Shane Monahan.

== Career ==
Selected by the California Golden Seals in the 1971 NHL entry draft, Monahan played only one game with the Golden Seals before he was traded to the New York Rangers. During the 1975 NHL Intra-League Draft, he was claimed by the Washington Capitals, where he played for two seasons. Monahan was traded to the Pittsburgh Penguins in 1977, and would be dealt again during the 1977–78 season to the Los Angeles Kings. After a season in the minors, he was claimed by the Quebec Nordiques in the 1979 NHL Expansion Draft, and was traded soon after to the St. Louis Blues, where he played until he retired following the 1980–81 NHL season.

In 334 NHL games, he scored 61 goals and 80 assists.

== Personal life ==
Hartland lived in Atlanta, Georgia, and was a manager for United Parcel Service. "Hart", as he was known by his close friends and associates, was the director of OnlineDonations.us, a team and educational fundraising company located in the Atlanta metro area.

In 2014, an ice arena in his hometown of Laval, Quebec was named in his honor after a letter writing campaign. Monahan died on December 9, 2023, at the age of 72.

== Career statistics ==
=== Regular season and playoffs ===
			Regular season					Playoffs
Season	Team	League	GP	G	A	Pts	PIM	GP	G	A	Pts	PIM
1969–70	Montreal Junior Canadiens	OHA	54	10	14	24	72	—	—	—	—	—
1970–71	Montreal Junior Canadiens	OHA	43	14	29	43	135	—	—	—	—	—
1971–72	Baltimore Clippers	AHL	20	1	1	2	4	—	—	—	—	—
1971–72	Columbus Golden Seals	IHL	36	8	19	27	53	—	—	—	—	—
1972–73	Salt Lake Golden Eagles	WHL	61	18	34	52	60	9	5	2	7	6
1973–74	Salt Lake Golden Eagles	WHL	66	14	28	42	76	5	1	2	3	2
1973–74	California Golden Seals	NHL	1	0	0	0	0	—	—	—	—	—
1974–75	Providence Reds	AHL	70	28	42	70	96	6	2	2	4	14
1974–75	New York Rangers	NHL	6	0	1	1	4	—	—	—	—	—
1975–76	Washington Capitals	NHL	80	17	29	46	35	—	—	—	—	—
1976–77	Washington Capitals	NHL	79	23	27	50	37	—	—	—	—	—
1977–78	Los Angeles Kings	NHL	64	10	9	19	45	2	0	0	0	0
1977–78	Pittsburgh Penguins	NHL	7	2	0	2	2	—	—	—	—	—
1978–79	Springfield Indians	AHL	76	30	36	66	71	—	—	—	—	—
1979–80	St. Louis Blues	NHL	72	5	12	17	36	3	0	0	0	0
1980–81	St. Louis Blues	NHL	25	4	2	6	4	1	0	0	0	4
NHL totals			334	61	80	141	163	6	0	0	0	4
