= 1994 Atlantic Coast Conference baseball tournament =

American college baseball tournament

- Teams: 9
- Format: Play-in round followed by eight-team double elimination
- Finals site: Greenville Municipal Stadium; Greenville, South Carolina
- Champions: Clemson (8th title)
- Winning coach: Jack Leggett (1st title)
- MVP: Shane Monahan (Clemson)
- Attendance: 40,028

1994 Atlantic Coast Conference baseball standings
	Conf.				Overall
Team	W		L	PCT	W		L	PCT
No. 9 Clemson ‍†‍‡‍^{y}	20	–	4	.833	57	–	18	.760
No. 2 Georgia Tech ‍‍‍^{y}	16	–	8	.667	50	–	17	.746
Duke ‍‍‍	16	–	8	.667	33	–	20	.623
No. 6 Florida State ‍‍‍^{y}	14	–	9	.609	53	–	22	.707
NC State ‍‍‍^{y}	13	–	11	.542	46	–	18	.719
North Carolina ‍‍‍	10	–	13	.435	34	–	21	.618
Wake Forest ‍‍‍	10	–	14	.417	37	–	20	.649
Maryland ‍‍‍	6	–	18	.250	24	–	30	.444
Virginia ‍‍‍	2	–	22	.083	20	–	34	.370
† – Conference champion ‡ – Tournament champion y – Invited to the NCAA tournament As of June 30, 1994; Rankings from Collegiate Baseball

The 1994 Atlantic Coast Conference baseball tournament was held in Greenville, SC from May 17 through 22. Clemson won the tournament and earned the Atlantic Coast Conference's automatic bid to the 1994 NCAA Division I baseball tournament.

== Tournament ==
=== Play-in game ===
- The two teams with the worst records in regular season conference play faced each other in a single elimination situation to earn the 8th spot in the conference tournament.

Play-in game
9	Virginia	2
8	Maryland	8

=== Main bracket ===
Upper round 1
8	Maryland	1
1	Clemson	7
5	NC State	6
4	Florida State	5
6	North Carolina	4
3	Georgia Tech	7
7	Wake Forest	9
2	Duke	6

Upper round 2
1	Clemson	17
5	NC State	5
3	Georgia Tech	6
7	Wake Forest	0
Lower round 1
4	Florida State	7
8	Maryland	1
2	Duke	12
6	North Carolina	13

Upper final
1	Clemson	9
3	Georgia Tech	6
Lower round 2
7	Wake Forest	3
4	Florida State	18
5	NC State	11
6	North Carolina	6

Semifinals
4	Florida State	10
1	Clemson	4
3	Georgia Tech	3
5	NC State	11

Preliminary final
5	NC State	4
4	Florida State	7

Final
4	Florida State	1
1	Clemson	4

== All-Tournament Team ==
Position	Player	School
1B	Andy Barkett	NC State
2B	Tom Sergio	NC State
3B	Mike Hampton	Clemson
SS	Nomar Garciaparra	Georgia Tech
C	Manny DaSilva	North Carolina
OF	Randy Hodges	Florida State
OF	Shane Monahan	Clemson
OF	Scott Zech	Florida State
DH	Pat Clougherty	NC State
SP	Paul Wilson	Florida State
RP	Ken Vining	Clemson
MVP	Shane Monahan	Clemson

(*)Denotes Unanimous Selection

== See also ==
- College World Series
- NCAA Division I Baseball Championship
