= John Pawlowski =

American baseball player and coach (born 1963)

- Pawlowski with Auburn in 2010

Biographical details
- Born: September 6, 1963 (age 63); Johnson City, New York, U.S.

Playing career
- 1983–1985: Clemson
- Position: Pitcher

Coaching career (HC unless noted)
- 1994–1998: Clemson (assistant)
- 1999: Arizona State (assistant)
- 2000–2008: College of Charleston
- 2009–2013: Auburn
- 2014–2015: San Diego State (assistant)
- 2016–2022: Western Kentucky

Head coaching record
- Overall: 645–514–2

Accomplishments and honors

Championships
- 3× SoCon regular season (2004, 2005, 2007); SoCon tournament (2006); SEC West Division (2010)

John Pawlowski (born September 6, 1963) is an American baseball coach and former pitcher. He played college baseball at Clemson for coach Bill Wilhelm from 1983 to 1985 and in Major League Baseball (MLB) for 2 seasons from 1987 to 1988. He then served as head coach of the College of Charleston Cougars (2000–2008), the Auburn Tigers (2009–2013) and the Western Kentucky Hilltoppers (2016–2022).

== Playing career ==
John Pawlowski
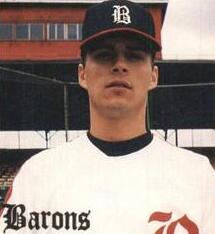
- Pawlowski with the Birmingham Barons c. 1987
- Pitcher
- Born: September 6, 1963 (age 63); Johnson City, New York, U.S.
- Batted: Right Threw: Right

MLB debut
- September 19, 1987, for the Chicago White Sox

Last MLB appearance
- May 10, 1988, for the Chicago White Sox

MLB statistics
- Win–loss record: 1–0
- Earned run average: 7.64
- Strikeouts: 12
- Stats at Baseball Reference

Teams
- Chicago White Sox (1987–1988)

Pawlowski attended Seton Catholic Central High School in Binghamton, New York and played college baseball at Clemson.

Pawlowski had a short career in the Major Leagues with the Chicago White Sox where he played on the 1987 and 1988 teams, appearing as a pitcher in eight total games.

== Coaching career ==
On June 20, 2008, Pawlowski was named the head baseball coach of the Auburn Tigers. In 2009, his first season with Auburn, the Tigers finished with a 31–25 record, and just 11 wins in Southeastern Conference (SEC) play. In 2010, he responded with a 38–17 and 20 SEC win season, making it the most SEC wins an Auburn team has ever had in the regular season. The team had a losing league record for the next three seasons, however, and Pawlowski was fired at the end of the 2013 season.

On June 4, 2015, Pawlowski was named the head coach of the Western Kentucky Hilltoppers. On May 18, 2022, Pawlowski submitted his resignation effective at the end of the season.

== Head coaching record ==
Record table
| Season | Team | Overall | Conference | Standing | Postseason |
|---|---|---|---|---|---|
College of Charleston Cougars (Southern Conference) (2000–2008)
| 2000 | College of Charleston | 28–28–1 | 14–15–1 | T–6th | |
| 2001 | College of Charleston | 24–28 | 10–16 | 8th | |
| 2002 | College of Charleston | 36–22 | 19–11 | 3rd | |
| 2003 | College of Charleston | 31–27 | 17–13 | T–4th | |
| 2004 | College of Charleston | 47–16 | 25–5 | 1st | NCAA Regional |
| 2005 | College of Charleston | 48–15 | 27–3 | 1st | NCAA Regional |
| 2006 | College of Charleston | 46–17 | 20–7 | 2nd | NCAA Super Regional |
| 2007 | College of Charleston | 39–19 | 20–7 | T–1st | |
| 2008 | College of Charleston | 39–20 | 18–9 | 2nd | |
| College of Charleston: | | 338–192–1 | 170–86–1 | | |
Auburn Tigers (Southeastern Conference) (2009–2013)
| 2009 | Auburn | 31–25 | 11–19 | 5th (West) | |
| 2010 | Auburn | 43–21 | 20–10 | 1st (West) | NCAA Regional |
| 2011 | Auburn | 29–29 | 14–16 | T–2nd (West) | |
| 2012 | Auburn | 31–28 | 13–17 | 5th (West) | |
| 2013 | Auburn | 33–23 | 13–17 | 7th (West) | |
| Auburn: | | 167–126 | 71–79 | | |
Western Kentucky Hilltoppers (Conference USA) (2016–2022)
| 2016 | Western Kentucky | 24–30 | 10–20 | 10th | |
| 2017 | Western Kentucky | 14–35 | 4–20 | 12th | |
| 2018 | Western Kentucky | 21–31 | 11–18 | 10th | |
| 2019 | Western Kentucky | 26–29–1 | 16–13–1 | 4th | |
| 2020 | Western Kentucky | 10–6 | 0–0 | | Season canceled due to COVID-19 |
| 2021 | Western Kentucky | 27–29 | 15–17 | 4th (East) | C-USA tournament |
| 2022 | Western Kentucky | 18–36 | 7–23 | 12th | |
| Western Kentucky: | | 140–196–1 | 63–111–1 | | |
| Total: | | 645–514–2 | | | |
National champion Postseason invitational champion Conference regular season champion Conference regular season and conference tournament champion Division regular season champion Division regular season and conference tournament champion Conference tournament champion
