= Scott Winchester =

American baseball player (born 1973)

- Pitcher
- Born: April 20, 1973 (age 52); Midland, Michigan, U.S.
- Batted: Right Threw: Right

MLB debut
- September 8, 1997, for the Cincinnati Reds

Last MLB appearance
- August 9, 2001, for the Cincinnati Reds

MLB statistics
- Win–loss record: 3–8
- Earned run average: 5.42
- Strikeouts: 55
- Stats at Baseball Reference

Teams
- Cincinnati Reds (1997–2001)

Scott Joseph Winchester (born April 20, 1973) is an American former professional baseball player. A pitcher, Winchester played all or parts of four seasons in Major League Baseball (MLB) for the Cincinnati Reds between 1997 and 2001.

== Amateur career ==
Winchester attended Clemson University from 1993 to 1996, where he was a 3-time Letterman. In 1994, he played collegiate summer baseball with the Falmouth Commodores of the Cape Cod Baseball League and was named a league all-star. In 1995, he set what was then a school record for most pitching appearances by a Clemson pitcher with 33 (he now shares that record with 3 other former Clemson pitchers), all of them in relief; also in 1995, he had a Clemson single-season record ERA of 0.59. He finished his 3-year Clemson career with a 1.70 ERA.

Among his honors, Winchester was an ACC Player of the Week twice in 1994, and a member of the 1995 1st Team All-ACC Tournament team. Winchester was a Freshman All-American in 1993, an honor he shared with teammate, Shane Monahan. He was a Clemson All-American in both 1994 and 1995, as well as an All-ACC Selection. In 1995, he was an ABCA, Baseball America, and Collegiate Baseball All-American; he was both a First Team All-ACC player on the field and on the ACC Academic Honor Roll. That year, he was ranked 6th in the NCAA in saves with 14.

== Professional career ==
Winchester was drafted in the 14th round of the 1995 Major League Baseball draft by the Cleveland Indians. He began the 1997 season in Class A, but quickly ascended through the minor leagues over the course of the season. He was traded to the Reds in midseason, and continued to move up the ladder, reaching the majors in September. He appeared in five games for the Reds, pitching six innings with a 6.00 ERA.

In 1998, the Reds decided to convert Winchester into a starter. He started the season in Triple-A, but was called up to the Reds on April 24 after just three starts. After going 3–6 with a 5.81 ERA in 16 starts, he was optioned back down to the minor leagues. He wound up pitching just three more games in the minors before undergoing shoulder surgery in August.

Winchester opened the 1999 season on the disabled list. He wound up pitching just six times that season, all for the Class-A Rockford Reds. He opened the 2000 season in Triple-A again, and was converted back to relieving. He was called up to the majors in June, but appeared in just five games before returning to the minor leagues.

Winchester split the 2001 season between Triple-A and the majors, and between the rotation and the bullpen. In 12 games for the Reds, he had an 0–2 record and a 4.50 ERA. After the season, he became a free agent, signing with the Montreal Expos. He played the entire season in the minors, starting with the Ottawa Lynx and moving on to the Syracuse SkyChiefs in the Toronto Blue Jays organization. He last played professional baseball in 2003 with the Las Vegas 51s in the Los Angeles Dodgers system.
