= Jesse Reynolds (baseball) =

American minor league baseball player and college coach (1876–1964)

Jesse Truman Reynolds
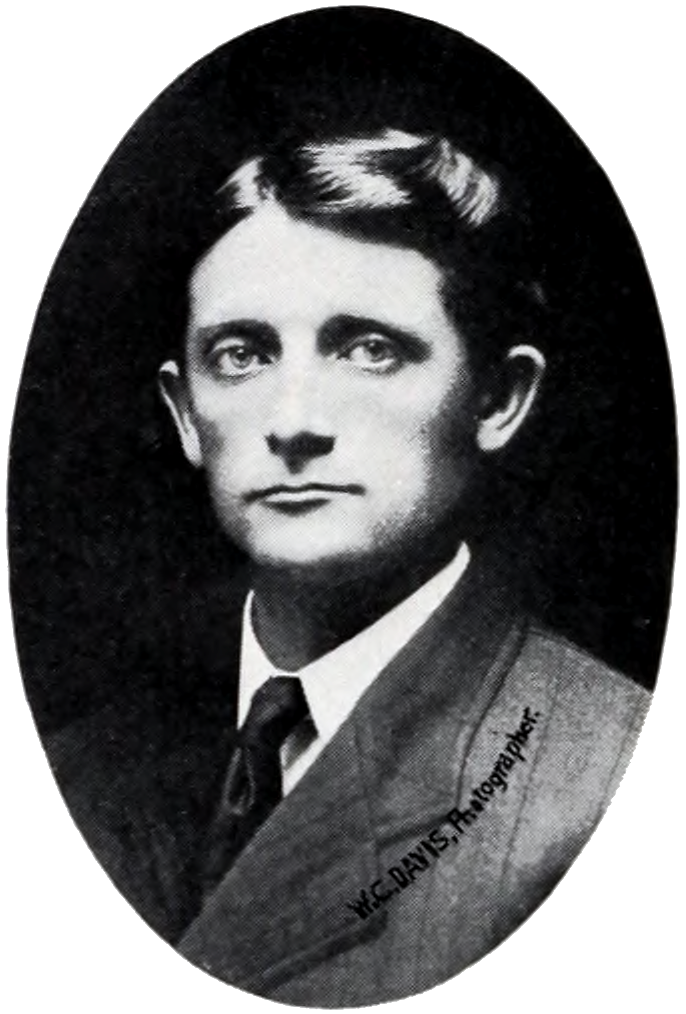
- Reynolds in 1909
- Pitcher / Outfielder / Coach
- Born: June 3, 1876; Otway, Ohio, U.S.
- Died: March 19, 1964 (aged 87); Los Angeles, California, U.S.

Teams
- As player: Columbus Senators (1901); Vicksburg Hill Climbers (1902); Natchez Indians (1903); Manchester (1903); Charleston Sea Gulls (1904); Columbia Skyscrapers (1904); New Orleans Pelicans (1905); Charlotte Hornets (1905); Columbia Gamecocks (1905); Denver Grizzlies (1906); Ottumwa Champs (1906); Roanoke Tigers (1907–1909); As coach: Vicksburg Hill Climbers (1902); Clemson (1909)

Jesse Truman Reynolds (June 3, 1876 – March 19, 1964) was an American baseball player and coach. Born in Otway, Ohio, Reynolds played minor league baseball from 1901 through 1909. He played as high as the Class A level for the Columbus Senators of the Western Association, the New Orleans Pelicans of the Southern Association, and the Denver Grizzlies of the Western League. He also managed the Vicksburg Hill Climbers in 1902 and the Clemson Tigers in 1909, leading the team to a 10–12 record.
