= Shane Monahan =

American baseball player

- Outfielder / Designated hitter
- Born: August 12, 1974 (age 52); Syosset, New York, U.S.
- Batted: Left Threw: Right

MLB debut
- July 9, 1998, for the Seattle Mariners

Last MLB appearance
- October 3, 1999, for the Seattle Mariners

MLB statistics
- Batting average: .235
- Home runs: 4
- Runs batted in: 28
- Stats at Baseball Reference

Teams
- Seattle Mariners (1998–1999)

Shane Hartland Monahan (born August 12, 1974) is an American former Major League Baseball outfielder and designated hitter. He played his entire career for the Seattle Mariners (1998–99). He is a graduate of Joseph Wheeler High School in Marietta, Georgia and attended Clemson University. Monahan now lives in South Carolina. Monahan is arguably one of the top 5 greatest Clemson Tiger baseball players ever.

Monahan comes from a family that is well known in the National Hockey League. Monahan's father was Hartland Monahan, his maternal grandfather was Bernie Geoffrion, a Hall of Famer who is credited with inventing the slap shot in hockey, and his great-grandfather was NHL Hall of Famer Howie Morenz. He is the nephew of Danny Geoffrion and cousin of Blake Geoffrion.

== Collegiate baseball career ==
While at Clemson University, Monahan broke several school and Atlantic Coast Conference records, some of which he still holds, including game appearances, at bats, and hits. Monahan appeared in every Clemson game during his 3 years at the school (1993–1995). In the 1994 season, Monahan led the NCAA in hits (137) and runs (97). His 137-hit season remains an ACC record. Also in 1994, Monahan set ACC single-season records of 330 at bats and 75 game appearances. He is one of only 5 Clemson Tigers to hit for the cycle, doing so in Hawai'i against Hawai'i-Hilo on March 19, 1994. He was ACC Player of the Week twice in 1994, and the ACC Tournament MVP. He was named to the All-ACC Tournament team in 1994 and 1995. In 1993, along with teammate Scott Winchester, Monahan was a Freshman All-American; in the 1994 and 1995 seasons, Monahan was a two-time All-American in the ABCA, Baseball America, Collegiate Baseball, and NCBWA polls.

In 1993, he played collegiate summer baseball in the Cape Cod Baseball League for the Yarmouth-Dennis Red Sox and was named a league all-star. Monahan was a 3-time Letterman at Clemson, and was inducted into the Clemson Athletic Hall of Fame in 2011.

== Professional baseball career ==
Monahan was picked by the Atlanta Braves in 18th Round of 1992 amateur entry draft, but chose to attend Clemson University instead. He was next selected in the second round by the Seattle Mariners in the 1995 amateur entry draft.

From 1995 through 1997, Monahan played on minor league affiliates of the Mariners. Between 1998 and 1999, he split the seasons between the Mariners and the Tacoma Rainiers.

After the 1999 season, Monahan returned to the minors and between 1999 and 2002 he played for minor league affiliates of the Mariners, Cincinnati Reds, San Diego Padres, Colorado Rockies, Pittsburgh Pirates, and Kansas City Royals. Monahan ended his professional career in 2003 playing for the independent Atlantic City Surf of the Atlantic League of Professional Baseball.

== Admission of drug use ==
On December 28, 2007, Monahan admitted in an interview with ESPN that he used the anabolic steroids Deca-Durabolin and Winstrol as well as amphetamines during his playing career. Monahan stated that he started using steroids in 1998, partly because of what he states was widespread use in the Mariners clubhouse.

During the time he played with the Mariners, he played with players who were mentioned in the Mitchell Report, including Ryan Franklin, Glenallen Hill, David Segui and Todd Williams.

Three players have since come out to refute Monahan's comments regarding the Mariner clubhouse atmosphere.

Raúl Ibañez stated:

It's amazing to me that a guy like Shane—a guy who was up and down at best and had a very limited cup of coffee with us—would be able to know what was going on. I was up and down like he was. I was in that same boat that he was in, and everyone makes their choice. In 10 years, I've never seen a person take a steroid.

Jamie Moyer stated:

I can tell you that I was there for 10 years and I never saw anyone take steroids. This will be my 20th year in the major leagues, and I don't even know what a steroid looks like. If I have to start relying on those things, after so many years in the game, then it's time to pack it in. That's the way I look at things.

Edgar Martínez, like former teammates Raúl Ibañez and Jamie Moyer, denied allegations of such use in the clubhouse. Martínez made this statement while visiting the Mariners in spring training:

I don't know why [Monahan] said that, I was there for a long time, and I didn't see what he saw...What are you going to do? There has been a lot of this going on around baseball...But like I said, I was there for a long time and never saw any of that.

— Edgar Martínez, seattletimes.com: March 15, 2008.

== See also ==
- List of doping cases in sport

== Sources ==
- Career statistics from MLB · Baseball Reference · Fangraphs · Baseball Reference (Minors) · Retrosheet · Baseball Almanac
