= Keith Williams (baseball) =

American baseball player (born 1972)

- Outfielder
- Born: April 21, 1972 (age 54); Bedford, Pennsylvania, U.S.
- Batted: Right Threw: Right

MLB debut
- June 7, 1996, for the San Francisco Giants

Last MLB appearance
- June 23, 1996, for the San Francisco Giants

MLB statistics
- Batting average: .250
- Home runs: 0
- Runs batted in: 0
- Stats at Baseball Reference

Teams
- San Francisco Giants (1996)

David Keith Williams (born April 21, 1972) is an American former Major League Baseball player for the San Francisco Giants during the 1996 season. He was drafted in the 7th round of the 1993 amateur draft.

== Minor leagues ==
Williams had a career .291 batting average in the minor leagues and 117 home runs over 8 seasons. His overall minor league OPS was .853. He was called up to the majors in 1996, but his best season in the minors was 1997, where he hit .320 with 22 home runs for the Giants AA team.

== Major leagues ==
Williams had his major league debut on June 7, 1996, going 0 for 1. His final game was on June 23, 1996. Overall, he went 5 for 20 with 6 strikeouts. All five of his hits were singles, and he did not score or drive in a single run. Defensively, he did not make a single error in 4 games played.
