= 1993 Atlantic Coast Conference baseball tournament =

American college baseball tournament

- Teams: 9
- Format: Nine-team double elimination
- Finals site: Greenville Municipal Stadium; Greenville, South Carolina
- Champions: Clemson (7th title)
- Winning coach: Bill Wilhelm (7th title)
- MVP: Jeff Morris (Clemson)
- Attendance: 33,238

1993 Atlantic Coast Conference baseball standings
	Conf.				Overall
Team	W		L	PCT	W		L	PCT
No. 13 Georgia Tech ‍†‍‍^{y}	16	–	6	.727	47	–	14	.770
No. 21 NC State ‍‍‍^{y}	15	–	7	.682	49	–	17	.742
No. 22 Florida State ‍‍‍^{y}	14	–	9	.609	46	–	19	.708
No. 23 North Carolina ‍‍‍^{y}	13	–	10	.565	43	–	20	.683
No. 17 Clemson ‍‍‡‍^{y}	11	–	11	.500	45	–	20	.692
Duke ‍‍‍	11	–	13	.458	39	–	19	.672
Wake Forest ‍‍‍	9	–	13	.409	31	–	22	.585
Virginia ‍‍‍	7	–	15	.318	21	–	30	.412
Maryland ‍‍‍	5	–	17	.227	24	–	29	.453
† – Conference champion ‡ – Tournament champion y – Invited to the NCAA tournament As of June 30, 1993; Rankings from Collegiate Baseball

The 1993 Atlantic Coast Conference baseball tournament was held in Greenville, SC from May 15 through 20. Clemson won the tournament and earned the Atlantic Coast Conference's automatic bid to the 1993 NCAA Division I baseball tournament.

== Seeding and format ==
All nine teams qualified for the conference tournament, with several byes allowing for a nine-team double-elimination tournament.

From TheACC.com:

On Saturday (The Semifinals) of the ACC Baseball Tournament, the match-up between the four remaining teams is determined by previous opponents. If teams have played previously in the tournament, every attempt will be made to avoid a repeat match-up between teams, regardless of seed. If it is impossible to avoid a match-up that already occurred, then the determination is based on avoiding the most recent, current tournament match-up, regardless of seed. If no match-ups have occurred, the team left in the winners bracket will play the lowest seeded team from the losers bracket.

=== Seeding ===
Team	W	L	Pct.	GB	Seed
Georgia Tech	16	6	.727	–	1
NC State	15	7	.682	1	2
Florida State	14	9	.609	2.5	3
North Carolina	13	10	.565	3.5	4
Clemson	11	11	.500	5	5
Duke	11	13	.458	6	6
Wake Forest	9	13	.409	7	7
Virginia	7	15	.318	9	8
Maryland	5	17	.227	11	9

== Bracket ==
Upper round 1
6	Duke	2
5	Clemson	4

Upper round 2
5	Clemson	6
3	Florida State	1
9	Maryland	0
1	Georgia Tech	6
7	Wake Forest	3
4	North Carolina	4
8	Virginia	5
2	NC State	7
Lower round 1
7	Wake Forest	7
8	Virginia	8

Upper round 3
5	Clemson	9
1	Georgia Tech	8
4	North Carolina	6
2	N.C. State	2
Lower round 2
3	Florida State	11
8	Virginia	2
9	Maryland	4
6	Duke	5

Upper final
5	Clemson	7
4	North Carolina	4
Lower round 3
1	Georgia Tech	2
3	Florida State	5
6	Duke	3
2	N.C. State	4

Semifinals
4	North Carolina	7
2	N.C. State	12
3	Florida State	7
5	Clemson	5

Preliminary final
2	N.C. State	5
3	Florida State	1

Final
5	Clemson	11
2	N.C. State	7

The brackets were set up without an elimination play-in game and several byes, which allowed all 9 teams to play in a double-elimination format. To clarify the brackets above, the match-ups (by round) to the reordered semifinals were as follows:

- 1st Round: Maryland vs. Georgia Tech, Clemson vs. Duke, Florida State - bye, N.C. State vs. Virginia, North Carolina vs. Wake Forest
- 2nd Round (winner's): Georgia Tech - bye, Clemson vs. Florida State, North Carolina vs. N.C. State
- 2nd Round (loser's): Duke vs. Maryland, Virginia vs. Wake Forest
- 3rd Round (winner's): Clemson vs. Georgia Tech, North Carolina - bye
- 3rd Round (loser's): Duke vs. N.C. State, Florida State vs. Virginia
- 4th Round (winner's): Clemson vs. North Carolina
- 4th Round (loser's): N.C. State - bye, Florida State vs. Georgia Tech

== All-Tournament Team ==
Position	Player	School
1B	Doug Mientkiewicz	Florida State
2B	Jeff Morris	Clemson
3B	Mickey Lopez	Florida State
SS	Mike Olexa	Duke
C	Jason Varitek	Georgia Tech
OF	Kevin Ross	NC State
OF	Billy McMillon	Clemson
OF	Keith Williams	Clemson
DH	Cookie Massey	North Carolina
P	Terry Harvey	NC State
P	Andy Taulbee	Clemson
MVP	Jeff Morris	Clemson

== See also ==
- College World Series
- NCAA Division I Baseball Championship
