= 1998 Atlantic Coast Conference baseball tournament =

American college baseball tournament

- Teams: 9
- Format: Play-in round followed by eight-team double elimination
- Finals site: Durham Bulls Athletic Park; Durham, North Carolina
- Champions: Wake Forest (2nd title)
- Winning coach: George Greer (1st title)
- MVP: John Hendricks (Wake Forest)
- Attendance: 24,162

1998 Atlantic Coast Conference baseball standings
	Conf.				Overall
Team	W		L	PCT	W		L	PCT
No. 8 Florida State ‍†‍‍^{y}	18	–	4	.818	53	–	20	.726
No. 15 Georgia Tech ‍‍‍^{y}	14	–	9	.609	41	–	22	.651
No. 23 Clemson ‍‍‍^{y}	14	–	9	.609	43	–	16	.729
NC State ‍‍‍^{y}	12	–	9	.571	39	–	21	.650
No. 27 Wake Forest ‍‍‡‍^{y}	13	–	10	.565	43	–	23	.652
No. 18 North Carolina ‍‍‍^{y}	13	–	10	.565	42	–	23	.646
Duke ‍‍‍	8	–	15	.348	38	–	20	.655
Maryland ‍‍‍	5	–	18	.217	26	–	30	.464
Virginia ‍‍‍	5	–	18	.217	28	–	26	.519
† – Conference champion ‡ – Tournament champion y – Invited to the NCAA tournament As of June 30, 1998; Rankings from Collegiate Baseball

The 1998 Atlantic Coast Conference baseball tournament was held at the Durham Bulls Athletic Park in Durham, North Carolina, from May 12 through 17. Wake Forest won the tournament and earned the Atlantic Coast Conference's automatic bid to the 1998 NCAA Division I baseball tournament.

== Tournament ==
=== Play-in game ===
- The two teams with the worst records in regular season conference play faced each other in a single elimination situation to earn the 8th spot in the conference tournament.

Play-in game
9	Virginia	9*
8	Maryland	4*

- (*) Denotes 10 Innings

=== Main Bracket ===
==== Seeding Procedure ====
From TheACC.com:

On Saturday (The Semifinals) of the ACC Baseball Tournament, the match-up between the four remaining teams is determined by previous opponents. If teams have played previously in the tournament, every attempt will be made to avoid a repeat match-up between teams, regardless of seed. If it is impossible to avoid a match-up that already occurred, then the determination is based on avoiding the most recent, current tournament match-up, regardless of seed. If no match-ups have occurred, the team left in the winners bracket will play the lowest seeded team from the losers bracket.

==== Bracket ====
Upper round 1
9	Virginia	1
1	Florida State	4
5	Wake Forest	9
4	NC State	1
6	North Carolina	4
3	Clemson	1
7	Duke	4
2	Georgia Tech	0

Upper round 2
1	Florida State	14
5	Wake Forest	1
6	North Carolina	3
7	Duke	0
Lower round 1
4	NC State	4
9	Virginia	1
3	Clemson	6
2	Georgia Tech	10

Upper final
1	Florida State	13*
6	North Carolina	11*
Lower round 2
7	Duke	4
4	NC State	10
2	Georgia Tech	1
5	Wake Forest	2

Semifinals
4	NC State	6
1	Florida State	13
5	Wake Forest	3
6	North Carolina	0

Final
1	Florida State	1	3
5	Wake Forest	2	6

- (*) Denotes 10 Innings

== All-Tournament Team ==
Position	Player	School
1B	Jon Palmieri	Wake Forest
2B	Brian Ward	NC State
3B	Corey Slavik	Wake Forest
SS	Brian Roberts	North Carolina
C	Jeremy Salazar	Florida State
OF	Matt Diaz	Florida State
OF	Scott Daeley	Wake Forest
OF	Brian Cox	Florida State
DH	Brad Piercy	NC State
P	John Hendricks	Wake Forest
P	Danny Borrell	Wake Forest
MVP	John Hendricks	Wake Forest

(*)Denotes Unanimous Selection

== See also ==
- College World Series
- NCAA Division I Baseball Championship
