= Mike Hampton (baseball coach) =

American baseball coach

Current position
- Title: Head coach
- Team: St. John's
- Conference: Big East
- Record: 177–154–2 (.535)

Biographical details
- Born: January 17, 1972 (age 54); Ramstein-Miesenbach, Germany

Playing career
- 1993–1994: Clemson
- 1994: Billings Mustangs
- 1995–1996: Charleston AlleyCats
- 1997: Burlington Bees
- Position: Third baseman

Coaching career (HC unless noted)
- 1999: Clemson (asst.)
- 2000–2001: West Virginia (H)
- 2002–2019: St. John's (H/RC)
- 2020–present: St. John's

Head coaching record
- Overall: 177–154–2 (.535)
- Tournaments: Big East: 3–2; NCAA: 2–2

Accomplishments and honors

Championships
- NCAA Regional (2026); Big East regular season (2026); 2 Big East Tournament championship (2024, 2026)

Awards
- Collegiate Baseball First Team All-American (1994); 2 Big East Coaching Staff of the Year (2024, 2026)

Michael Anthony Hampton (born January 17, 1972) is an American college baseball coach and former third baseman. He is the head baseball coach at the St. John's University. Hampton played college baseball at Clemson University from 1993 to 1994 before pursuing a professional career from 1994 to 1997. In college, he was named an All-American in 1994.

== Playing career ==
As a junior at Clemson University in 1993, Hampton had a .254 batting average, a .322 on-base percentage (OBP), and a .454 SLG, with nine home runs.

As a senior in 1994, Hampton batted .380 with a .596 SLG, 11 home runs, and 70 RBIs. He was named first team All-Atlantic Coast Conference and he was also named a first-team All-American by Collegiate Baseball.

Hampton was selected in the 4th round of the 1994 Major League Baseball draft by the Cincinnati Reds. After three years in the team's farm system, Hampton retired due to injuries.

== Coaching career ==
On September 1, 1998, Hampton was named an assistant coach at his alma mater, Clemson. Following a lone season at Clemson, Hampton was named the hitting coach at West Virginia University, where worked for two seasons.

In the fall of 2001, Hampton joined Ed Blankmeyer's coaching staff at St. John's University.

On January 9, 2020, Hampton was promoted to the interim head baseball coach at St. John's following Ed Blankmeyer's resignation to join the Brooklyn Cyclones.

== Head coaching record ==
Record table
Season	Team	Overall	Conference	Standing	Postseason
St. John's Red Storm (Big East Conference) (2020–present)
2020	St. John's	5–8	0–0		Season canceled due to COVID-19
2021	St. John's	19–21	10–16	6th	
2022	St. John's	22–32–1	7–12–1	6th	
2023	St. John's	28–25	8–12	6th	
2024	St. John's	38–18–1	14–7	2nd	NCAA Regional
2025	St. John's	29–24	13–8	3rd	Big East Tournament
2026	St. John's	36–26	15–6	T–1st	NCAA Super Regional
St. John's:		177–154–2 (.535)	67–61–1 (.523)		
Total:		177–154–2 (.535)			
National champion Postseason invitational champion Conference regular season champion Conference regular season and conference tournament champion Division regular season champion Division regular season and conference tournament champion Conference tournament champion

== See also ==
- List of current NCAA Division I baseball coaches
