= 1997 Atlantic Coast Conference baseball tournament =

American college baseball tournament

- Teams: 9
- Format: Play-in round followed by eight-team double elimination
- Finals site: Florida Power Park; St. Petersburg, Florida
- Champions: Florida State (2nd title)
- Winning coach: Mike Martin (2nd title)
- MVP: Jeremy Morris (Florida State)
- Attendance: 32,141

1997 Atlantic Coast Conference baseball standings
	Conf.				Overall
Team	W		L	PCT	W		L	PCT
No. 10 Georgia Tech ‍†‍‍^{y}	19	–	4	.826	46	–	15	.754
No. 9 Florida State ‍‍‡‍^{y}	18	–	6	.750	50	–	17	.746
No. 23 NC State ‍‍‍^{y}	15	–	8	.652	43	–	20	.683
Clemson ‍‍‍^{y}	13	–	10	.565	41	–	23	.641
Wake Forest ‍‍‍	10	–	13	.435	37	–	20	.649
Virginia ‍‍‍	10	–	13	.435	32	–	22	.593
Duke ‍‍‍	9	–	14	.391	33	–	25	.569
North Carolina ‍‍‍	6	–	18	.250	29	–	31	.483
Maryland ‍‍‍	5	–	19	.208	22	–	32	.407
† – Conference champion ‡ – Tournament champion y – Invited to the NCAA tournament As of June 30, 1997; Rankings from Collegiate Baseball

The 1997 Atlantic Coast Conference baseball tournament was held at the Florida Power Park in St. Petersburg, FL from May 13 through 17. Florida State won the tournament and earned the Atlantic Coast Conference's automatic bid to the 1997 NCAA Division I baseball tournament.

== Tournament ==
=== Play-in game ===
- The two teams with the worst records in regular season conference play faced each other in a single elimination situation to earn the 8th spot in the conference tournament.

Play-in game
9	Maryland	2
8	North Carolina	4

=== Main Bracket ===
==== Seeding Procedure ====
From TheACC.com:

On Saturday (The Semifinals) of the ACC Baseball Tournament, the match-up between the four remaining teams is determined by previous opponents. If teams have played previously in the tournament, every attempt will be made to avoid a repeat match-up between teams, regardless of seed. If it is impossible to avoid a match-up that already occurred, then the determination is based on avoiding the most recent, current tournament match-up, regardless of seed. If no match-ups have occurred, the team left in the winners bracket will play the lowest seeded team from the losers bracket.

==== Bracket ====
Upper round 1
8	North Carolina	6
1	Georgia Tech	7
5	Wake Forest	6
4	Clemson	8
6	Virginia	2
3	NC State	4
7	Duke	2
2	Florida State	4

Upper round 2
1	Georgia Tech	4
4	Clemson	7
3	NC State	3
2	Florida State	5
Lower round 1
8	North Carolina	4
5	Wake Forest	3
6	Virginia	3
7	Duke	16

Upper final
2	Florida State	8
4	Clemson	4
Lower round 2
3	NC State	4
8	North Carolina	2
7	Duke	5
1	Georgia Tech	3

Semifinals
2	Florida State	12
7	Duke	2
4	Clemson	11*
3	NC State	6*

Final
4	Clemson	0
2	Florida State	10

- (*) Denotes 10 Innings

== All-Tournament Team ==
Position	Player	School
1B	Chris Combs	NC State
2B	Scott Zech	Florida State
3B	Jeff Becker	Duke
SS	Brian Roberts	North Carolina
C	Jeremy Salazar	Florida State
OF	Gary Burnham	Clemson
OF	J. D. Drew	Florida State
OF	Jeremy Morris	Florida State
DH	Kris Wilson	Georgia Tech
P	Chris Chavez	Florida State
P	Randy Choate	Florida State
MVP	Jeremy Morris	Florida State

(*)Denotes Unanimous Selection

== See also ==
- College World Series
- NCAA Division I Baseball Championship
