= 1990 Atlantic Coast Conference baseball tournament =

American college baseball tournament

- Teams: 8
- Format: Eight-team double elimination
- Finals site: Greenville Municipal Stadium; Greenville, South Carolina
- Champions: North Carolina (4th title)
- Winning coach: Mike Roberts (4th title)
- MVP: Steve Estroff (North Carolina)
- Attendance: 37,150

1990 Atlantic Coast Conference baseball standings
| | Conf. | | | | Overall |
| Team | W | | L | PCT | W | | L | PCT |
|---|---|---|---|---|---|---|---|---|
| No. 21 North Carolina ‍†‍‡‍^{y} | 17 | – | 4 | .810 | 51 | – | 18 | .739 |
| No. 30 Clemson ‍‍‍^{y} | 14 | – | 6 | .700 | 43 | – | 23 | .652 |
| No. 26 NC State ‍‍‍^{y} | 14 | – | 7 | .667 | 48 | – | 20 | .706 |
| Wake Forest ‍‍‍ | 10 | – | 10 | .500 | 35 | – | 24 | .593 |
| Georgia Tech ‍‍‍^{y} | 9 | – | 9 | .500 | 46 | – | 25 | .648 |
| Virginia ‍‍‍ | 7 | – | 11 | .389 | 21 | – | 32 | .396 |
| Duke ‍‍‍ | 4 | – | 15 | .211 | 28 | – | 25 | .528 |
| Maryland ‍‍‍ | 2 | – | 15 | .118 | 22 | – | 26 | .458 |
† – Conference champion ‡ – Tournament champion y – Invited to the NCAA tournament As of June 30, 1990; Rankings from Collegiate Baseball

The 1990 Atlantic Coast Conference baseball tournament was the 1990 postseason baseball championship of the NCAA Division I Atlantic Coast Conference, held at Greenville Municipal Stadium in Greenville, South Carolina, from May 12 through 15. North Carolina defeated NC State in the championship game, earning the conference's automatic bid to the 1990 NCAA Division I baseball tournament.

== Format ==
All eight ACC teams qualified for the eight-team double-elimination tournament.

=== Seeding Procedure ===
From TheACC.com:

On Saturday (The Semifinals) of the ACC baseball tournament, the match-up between the four remaining teams is determined by previous opponents. If teams have played previously in the tournament, every attempt will be made to avoid a repeat match-up between teams, regardless of seed. If it is impossible to avoid a match-up that already occurred, then the determination is based on avoiding the most recent, current tournament match-up, regardless of seed. If no match-ups have occurred, the team left in the winners bracket will play the lowest seeded team from the losers bracket.

== Regular season results ==
| Team | W | L | PCT | GB | Seed |
|---|---|---|---|---|---|
| North Carolina | 17 | 4 | .810 | – | 1 |
| Clemson | 14 | 6 | .700 | 2.5 | 2 |
| NC State | 14 | 7 | .667 | 3 | 3 |
| Wake Forest | 10 | 10 | .500 | 6.5 | 4 |
| Georgia Tech | 9 | 9 | .500 | 6.5 | 5 |
| Virginia | 7 | 11 | .389 | 8.5 | 6 |
| Duke | 4 | 15 | .211 | 12 | 7 |
| Maryland | 2 | 15 | .118 | 13 | 8 |

== Tournament ==
Upper round 1
8 | Maryland | 1
1 | North Carolina | 3
5 | Georgia Tech | 3
4 | Wake Forest | 1
6 | Virginia | 14
3 | NC State | 1
7 | Duke | 3
2 | Clemson | 13

Upper round 2
1 | North Carolina | 9
5 | Georgia Tech | 4
2 | Clemson | 7
6 | Virginia | 3
Lower round 1
4 | Wake Forest | 7
8 | Maryland | 2
3 | NC State | 8
7 | Duke | 7

Upper final
2 | Clemson | 1
1 | North Carolina | 3
Lower round 2
6 | Virginia | 8
4 | Wake Forest | 4
5 | Georgia Tech | 6
3 | NC State | 10

Semifinals
1 | North Carolina | 7
6 | Virginia | 3
3 | NC State | 6
2 | Clemson | 5

Final
1 | North Carolina | 5
3 | NC State | 0

== All-tournament team ==
| Position | Player | School |
|---|---|---|
| C | Kevin O'Sullivan | Virginia |
| 1B | Steve Estroff | North Carolina |
| 2B | Vinnie Hughes | NC State |
| 3B | Andy Bruce | Georgia Tech |
| SS | Tim Rigsby | Clemson |
| OF | Brian Kowitz | Clemson |
| OF | Steve Shingledecker | NC State |
| OF | Jeff Pierce | NC State |
| DH | Anthony Maisano | Georgia Tech |
| SP | Frank Maney | North Carolina |
| RP | Brian Bark | NC State |
| MVP | Steve Estroff | North Carolina |

== See also ==
- College World Series
- NCAA Division I Baseball Championship
- Atlantic Coast Conference baseball tournament
