= 1978 College Baseball All-America Team =

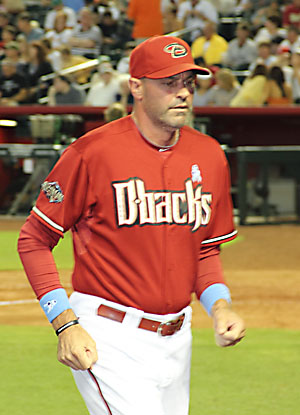
1978 All-Americans included 1988 NL MVP Kirk Gibson.

This is a list of college baseball players named first team All-Americans for the 1978 NCAA Division I baseball season. From 1964 to 1980, there were two generally recognized All-America selectors for baseball: the American Baseball Coaches Association and The Sporting News.

== Key ==
A	American Baseball Coaches Association
S	The Sporting News
	Member of the National College Baseball Hall of Fame
	Consensus All-American – selected by both organizations
	Consensus All-American – selected by one organization

== All-Americans ==
Position	Name	School	#	A	S	Other awards and honors
Pitcher	Bill Bordley	USC	2	✓	✓	
Pitcher	Rod Boxberger	USC	1	—	✓	College World Series Most Outstanding Player
Pitcher	Greg Norris	North Carolina	1	✓	—	
Catcher	Chris Bando	Arizona State	1	✓	—	
Catcher	Dave Van Gorder	USC	1	—	✓	
First baseman	Ron Johnson	Fresno State	1	✓	—	
First baseman	Don Troyan	St. John's	1	—	✓	
Second baseman	Bob Horner	Arizona State	2	✓	✓	Golden Spikes Award The Sporting News Player of the Year First overall pick in the 1978 MLB draft
Shortstop	Hubie Brooks	Arizona State	2	✓	✓	
Shortstop	Greg Cypret	Missouri	1	✓	—	
Third baseman	John Marquardt	South Carolina	1	✓	—	
Third baseman	Bill Springman	Oral Roberts	1	—	✓	
Outfielder	Kirk Gibson	Michigan State	2	✓	✓	
Outfielder	Mark Johnston	South Alabama	1	✓	—	
Outfielder	Steve Michael	Arizona State	1	—	✓	
Outfielder	Dave Stieb	Southern Illinois	1	—	✓	
Outfielder	Mike Stenhouse	Harvard	1	✓	—	
Designated hitter	Steve Balboni	Eckerd	1	—	✓	
Designated hitter	Tim Lollar	Arkansas	1	✓	—	

== See also ==
- List of college baseball awards
