= 1978 NCAA Division I baseball season =

Baseball season

- Number of teams: 239

NCAA tournament

College World Series
- Champions: USC (11th title)
- Runners-up: Arizona State (10th CWS Appearance)
- Winning coach: Rod Dedeaux (11th title)
- MOP: Rod Boxberger (USC)

Seasons
- ← 1977 1979 →

The 1978 NCAA Division I baseball season, play of college baseball in the United States organized by the National Collegiate Athletic Association (NCAA) began in the spring of 1978. The season progressed through the regular season and concluded with the 1978 College World Series. The College World Series, held for the thirty-second time in 1978, consisted of one team from each of eight regional competitions and was held in Omaha, Nebraska at Johnny Rosenblatt Stadium as a double-elimination tournament. Southern California claimed the championship for the eleventh time.

== Conference winners ==
This is a partial list of conference champions from the 1978 season. The NCAA sponsored regional competitions to determine the College World Series participants. Seven regionals of four teams and one of six each competed in double-elimination tournaments, with the winners advancing to Omaha. 21 teams earned automatic bids by winning their conference championship while 13 teams earned at-large selections.

Conference	Regular season winner	Conference tournament	Tournament venue • city	Tournament winner
Atlantic Coast Conference	Clemson	1978 Atlantic Coast Conference baseball tournament	Beautiful Tiger Field • Clemson, SC	Clemson
Big Eight Conference	East - Oklahoma; West - Missouri	1978 Big Eight Conference baseball tournament	All Sports Stadium • Oklahoma City, OK	Oklahoma State
Big Ten Conference	Michigan	No tournament		
EIBL	Harvard	No tournament		
Mid-American Conference	Eastern Michigan	No tournament		
Pacific-8 Conference	North - Washington State; South - Southern California	No tournament		
Southeastern Conference	East - Florida; West - Auburn	1978 Southeastern Conference baseball tournament	Perry Field • Gainesville, FL	Auburn
Southern Conference	Marshall	No tournament		
Southwest Conference	Texas A&M	1978 Southwest Conference baseball tournament	Disch–Falk Field • Austin, TX	Baylor
Western Athletic Conference	North - BYU; South - Arizona State	1978 Western Athletic Conference Baseball Championship Series	Packard Stadium • Tempe, AZ	Arizona State
Yankee Conference	UMass; New Hampshire	No tournament		

== Conference standings ==
The following is an incomplete list of conference standings:

1978 Atlantic Coast Conference baseball standings
	Conf.				Overall
Team	W		L	PCT	W		L	PCT
No. 25 Clemson ‍†‍‡‍^{y}	10	–	2	.833	39	–	14	.736
No. 3 North Carolina ‍‍‍^{y}	9	–	3	.750	38	–	17	.691
Wake Forest ‍‍‍	7	–	5	.583	23	–	14	.622
Maryland ‍‍‍	5	–	6	.455	14	–	14	.500
NC State ‍‍‍	5	–	7	.417	23	–	16	.590
Virginia ‍‍‍	4	–	8	.333	18	–	14	.563
Duke ‍‍‍	1	–	10	.091	12	–	22	.353
† – Conference champion ‡ – Tournament champion y – Invited to the NCAA tournament As of June 30, 1978; Rankings from Collegiate Baseball

1978 Big Ten Conference baseball standings
	Conf.						Overall
Team	W		L		T	PCT	W		L		T	PCT
No. 6 Michigan ‍†‍‍^{y}	13	–	3	–	0	.813	30	–	17	–	0	.638
Michigan State ‍‍‍	11	–	5	–	0	.688	33	–	21	–	0	.611
Wisconsin ‍‍‍	10	–	6	–	0	.625	23	–	21	–	1	.522
Iowa ‍‍‍	9	–	6	–	0	.600	28	–	17	–	0	.622
Minnesota ‍‍‍	7	–	7	–	0	.500	25	–	17	–	0	.595
Ohio State ‍‍‍	9	–	9	–	0	.500	24	–	23	–	0	.511
Indiana ‍‍‍	5	–	8	–	0	.385	20	–	23	–	0	.465
Northwestern ‍‍‍	6	–	10	–	0	.375	17	–	18	–	1	.486
Illinois ‍‍‍	6	–	12	–	0	.333	25	–	22	–	1	.531
Purdue ‍‍‍	3	–	13	–	0	.188	16	–	26	–	0	.381
† – Conference champion y – Invited to the NCAA tournament As of June 30, 1978; Rankings from Collegiate Baseball

1978 NCAA Division I baseball independents standings
	Conf.				Overall
Team	W		L	PCT	W		L	PCT
No. 4 Miami (FL) ‍‍‍^{y}		–		–	50	–	12	.806
No. 28 Hawaii ‍‍‍		–		–	38	–	14	.731
No. 11 Gonzaga ‍‍‍^{y}		–		–	33	–	14	.702
Detroit ‍‍‍		–		–	33	–	16	.673
Mercer ‍‍‍		–		–	32	–	16	.667
Stetson ‍‍‍		–		–	33	–	17	.660
Richmond ‍‍‍		–		–	21	–	12	.636
Virginia Tech ‍‍‍		–		–	27	–	17	.614
Air Force ‍‍‍		–		–	22	–	15	.595
Northern Iowa ‍‍‍		–		–	17	–	16	.515
Lafayette ‍‍‍		–		–	11	–	12	.478
Campbell ‍‍‍		–		–	12	–	15	.444
Villanova ‍‍‍		–		–	11	–	18	.379
Notre Dame ‍‍‍		–		–	12	–	25	.324
Hofstra ‍‍‍		–		–	7	–	18	.280
y – Invited to the NCAA tournament As of June 30, 1978; Rankings from Collegiate Baseball

1978 Pacific-8 Conference baseball standings
	Conf.				Overall
Team	W		L	PCT	W		L	PCT
Northern Division
No. 16 Washington State ^{x}‍‍‍^{y}	15	–	3	.833	41	–	17	.707
Oregon ‍‍‍	7	–	9	.438		–		–
Oregon State ‍‍‍	6	–	9	.400	22	–	22	.500
Washington ‍‍‍	5	–	12	.294	29	–	16	.644
Southern Division
#1 Southern California ^{xy} ‍‍‍	15	–	3	.833	54	–	9	.857
No. 15 UCLA ‍‍‍	9	–	9	.500	39	–	20	.661
California ‍‍‍	6	–	12	.333	35	–	27	.565
Stanford ‍‍‍	6	–	12	.333	35	–	20	.636
x – Division champion y – Invited to the NCAA tournament As of June 30, 1978; Rankings from Collegiate Baseball

1978 Southeastern Conference baseball standings
	Conf.				Overall
Team	W		L	PCT	W		L	PCT
Eastern Division
Florida ^{x}‍‍‍	18	–	4	.818	34	–	15	.694
Georgia ‍‍‍	11	–	12	.478	30	–	19	.612
Tennessee ‍‍‍	11	–	12	.478	25	–	21	.543
Vanderbilt ‍‍‍	10	–	13	.435	31	–	17	.646
Kentucky ‍‍‍	6	–	15	.286	20	–	25	.444
Western Division
No. 22 Auburn ^{x}‍‍‡‍^{y}	15	–	8	.652	33	–	21	.611
No. 14 Mississippi State ‍‍‍^{y}	13	–	8	.619	38	–	18	.679
Ole Miss ‍‍‍	12	–	11	.522	27	–	21	.563
Alabama ‍‍‍	10	–	11	.476	23	–	20	.535
LSU ‍‍‍	6	–	18	.250	12	–	34	.261
x – Division champion ‡ – Tournament champion y – Invited to the NCAA tournament As of June 30, 1978; Rankings from Collegiate Baseball

1978 Southern Conference baseball standings
	Conf.				Overall
Team	W		L	PCT	W		L	PCT
No. 17 Marshall ‍†‍‍^{y}	11	–	1	.917	27	–	13	.675
Appalachian State ‍‍‍	10	–	4	.714	24	–	10	.706
The Citadel ‍‍‍	9	–	5	.643	30	–	9	.769
Western Carolina ‍‍‍	8	–	5	.615	20	–	13	.606
Furman ‍‍‍	6	–	7	.462	13	–	18	.419
Chattanooga ‍‍‍	5	–	9	.357	25	–	18	.581
Davidson ‍‍‍	4	–	8	.333	15	–	26	.366
VMI ‍‍‍	0	–	14	.000	15	–	26	.366
† – Conference champion y – Invited to the NCAA tournament As of June 30, 1978; Rankings from Collegiate Baseball

1978 Southwest Conference baseball standings
	Conf.				Overall
Team	W		L	PCT	W		L	PCT
No. 12 Texas A&M ‍†‍‍^{y}	19	–	5	.792	39	–	16	.709
No. 18 Arkansas ‍‍‍	18	–	6	.750	31	–	13	.705
No. 8 Baylor ‍‍‡‍^{y}	15	–	9	.625	32	–	19	.627
No. 13 Houston ‍‍‍	14	–	10	.583	30	–	21	.588
Texas ‍‍‍	12	–	12	.500	36	–	16	.692
SMU ‍‍‍	9	–	15	.375	25	–	29	.463
Texas Tech ‍‍‍	8	–	16	.333	23	–	25	.479
TCU ‍‍‍	7	–	17	.292	18	–	29	.383
Rice ‍‍‍	6	–	18	.250	18	–	29	.383
† – Conference champion ‡ – Tournament champion y – Invited to the NCAA tournament As of June 30, 1978; Rankings from Collegiate Baseball

1978 Western Athletic Conference baseball standings
	Conf.				Overall
Team	W		L	PCT	W		L	PCT
Northern
BYU ^{x}‍‍‍	16	–	2	.889	37	–	15	.712
Wyoming ‍‍‍	8	–	10	.444	35	–	24	.593
Colorado State ‍‍‍	6	–	12	.333	20	–	26	.435
Utah ‍‍‍	6	–	12	.333	8	–	27	.229
Southern
No. 2 Arizona State ^{x}‍‍‡‍^{y}	15	–	3	.833	56	–	12	.824
Arizona ‍‍‍^{y}	13	–	5	.722	42	–	13	.764
New Mexico ‍‍‍	5	–	12	.294	31	–	24	.564
UTEP ‍‍‍	2	–	15	.118	26	–	26	.500
x – Division champion ‡ – Championship Series champion y – Invited to the NCAA tournament As of June 30, 1978; Rankings from Collegiate Baseball

== College World Series ==
The 1978 season marked the thirty second NCAA baseball tournament, which culminated with the eight team College World Series. The College World Series was held in Omaha, Nebraska. The eight teams played a double-elimination format, with Southern California claiming their eleventh championship with a 10–3 win over Arizona State in the final.

Upper round 1
Michigan	4
Baylor	0
Southern California	9
Miami (FL)	3
Oral Roberts	11
North Carolina	0
Arizona State	13
St. John's	2

Upper round 2
Michigan	3
Southern California	11
Oral Roberts	6
Arizona State	7
Lower round 1
Baylor	1
Miami (FL)	12
North Carolina	9
St. John's	5

Upper final
Southern California	5
Arizona State	2
Lower round 2
Oral Roberts	3
Miami (FL)	5
Michigan	6
North Carolina	7

Semifinals
Southern California	3
North Carolina	2
Arizona State	11
Miami (FL)	3

Final
Southern California	10
Arizona State	3
