= 1978 USC Trojans baseball team =

American college baseball season

1978 USC Trojans baseball

National champions Pacific-8 Conference champions
- Conference: Pacific-8 Conference
- CB: No. 1
- Record: 54–9 (15–3 Pac-8)
- Head coach: Rod Dedeaux (37th year)
- Home stadium: Dedeaux Field

1978 Pacific-8 Conference baseball standings
	Conf.				Overall
Team	W		L	PCT	W		L	PCT
Northern Division
No. 16 Washington State ^{x}‍‍‍^{y}	15	–	3	.833	41	–	17	.707
Oregon ‍‍‍	7	–	9	.438		–		–
Oregon State ‍‍‍	6	–	9	.400	22	–	22	.500
Washington ‍‍‍	5	–	12	.294	29	–	16	.644
Southern Division
#1 Southern California ^{xy} ‍‍‍	15	–	3	.833	54	–	9	.857
No. 15 UCLA ‍‍‍	9	–	9	.500	39	–	20	.661
California ‍‍‍	6	–	12	.333	35	–	27	.565
Stanford ‍‍‍	6	–	12	.333	35	–	20	.636
x – Division champion y – Invited to the NCAA tournament As of June 30, 1978; Rankings from Collegiate Baseball

The 1978 USC Trojans baseball team represented the University of Southern California in the 1978 NCAA Division I baseball season. The team was coached Rod Dedeaux in his 37th season.

The Trojans won the College World Series, defeating the Arizona State Sun Devils in the championship game for the Trojans eleventh and final national championship under Rod Dedeaux.

== Roster ==
1978 USC Trojans roster
Pitchers: Ron Arnold; Ray Benzor; Bill Bordley; Rod Boxberger; Bill Bumstead; Brian Hayes; Tom Marchica; Ernie Mauritson; Anthony Muñoz; Spiro Psaltis; Jeff Schattinger; Larry Simpson; Stan Williams; Jeff Wick	Infielders: Dan Burns; Dave Caffey; Jim Connor; Dave Engle; Larry Fobbs; Dave Hostetler; Jim McDowell; Marv Okamura; Frank Pennachio; Gerald Price; John Stevenson; Doug Stokke	Outfielders: Keith Brown; Mark Rhodes; Bob Skube; Chris Smith; Tim Tolman; John Wells; Paul Ziegler; Catchers: Tom Hicks; Dave Hodgins; Dave Van Gorder

== Schedule ==
1978 USC Trojans baseball game log
Regular season
February

Date	Opponent	Score	Overall record	Pac-8 record
February 14	at Pepperdine	0–3	0–1	–
February 18	at Cal State Fullerton	10–9	1–1	–
February 18	Cal State Fullerton	9–6	2–1	–
February 24	at Long Beach State	23–8	3–1	–
February 25	Saint Mary's	9–2	4–1	–
February 25	Saint Mary's	8–0	5–1	–

March

Date	Opponent	Score	Overall record	Pac-8 record
March 4	at Arizona State	9–13	5–2	–
March 4	at Arizona State	7–13	5–3	–
March 7	Pepperdine	7–0	6–3	–
March 10	Chapman	10–0	7–3	–
March 11	UC Irvine	2–8	7–4	–
March 11	UC Irvine	8–0	8–4	–
March 14	Cal State Dominguez	8–1	9–4	–
March 16	Cal State Los Angeles	14–4	10–4	–
March 17	at Cal State Los Angeles	10–1	11–4	–
March 18	Cal State Los Angeles	3–2	12–4	–
March 19	at Houston	13–1	13–4	–
March 20	at Houston	10–4	14–4	–
March 21	at Texas A&M	5–2	15–4	–
March 22	at Texas A&M	8–5	16–4	–
March 24	vs. Eastern Michigan	5–2	17–4	–
March 24	at Texas	8–2	18–4	–
March 25	at Texas	3–2	19–4	–
March 25	at Texas	2–3	19–5	–
March 28	Cal Lutheran	2–1	20–5	–
March 31	Arizona State	11–0	21–5	–

April

Date	Opponent	Score	Overall record	Pac-8 record
April 1	Arizona State	11–6	22–5	–
April 2	Arizona State	10–1	23–5	–
April 5	Cal State Northridge	12–1	24–5	–
April 8	at California	13–14	24–6	0–1
April 8	at California	6–2	25–6	1–1
April 9	at Santa Clara	7–2	26–6	–
April 13	Stanford	7–0	27–6	2–1
April 14	Stanford	2–3	27–7	2–2
April 15	Stanford	8–3	28–7	3–2
April 18	Pepperdine	10–2	29–7	–
April 20	UCLA	6–5	30–7	4–2
April 21	at UCLA	5–4	31–7	5–2
April 22	UCLA	7–3	32–7	6–2
April 24	Long Beach State	12–1	33–7	–
April 27	California	11–2	34–7	7–2
April 28	California	14–3	35–7	8–2
April 29	California	11–2	36–7	9–2
April 30	California	7–2	37–7	10–2

May

Date	Opponent	Score	Overall record	Pac-8 record
May 1	Cal Poly Pomona	11–5	38–7	–
May 2	Loyola Marymount	15–2	39–7	–
May 5	at Stanford	17–7	40–7	11–2
May 6	at Stanford	4–3	41–7	12–2
May 7	at Stanford	12–6	42–7	13–2
May 9	UC Santa Barbara	4–6	42–8	–
May 11	at UCLA	1–0	43–8	14–2
May 12	UCLA	7–6	44–8	15–2
May 13	at UCLA	8–9	44–9	15–3

Postseason
NCAA tournament: Pacific-8 playoffs

Date	Opponent	Site/stadium	Score	Overall record
May 20	vs. Washington State	Buck Bailey Field	3–2	45–9
May 21	vs. Washington State	Buck Bailey Field	5–4	46–9

NCAA tournament: District 8 playoffs

Date	Opponent	Site/stadium	Score	Overall record
May 26	vs. Arizona	Dedeaux Field	3–2	47–9
May 27	vs. Cal State Fullerton	Dedeaux Field	3–2	48–9
May 28	vs. Arizona	Dedeaux Field	2–1	49–9

NCAA tournament: College World Series

Date	Opponent	Site/stadium	Score	Overall record
June 2	vs. Miami (FL)	Rosenblatt Stadium	9–3	50–9
June 4	vs. Michigan	Rosenblatt Stadium	11–3	51–9
June 6	vs. Arizona State	Rosenblatt Stadium	5–2	52–9
June 7	vs. North Carolina	Rosenblatt Stadium	3–2	53–9
June 8	vs. Arizona State	Rosenblatt Stadium	10–3	54–9

== Awards and honors ==
Bill Bordley

- All-America First Team
- Pacific-8 Player of the Year

Rod Boxberger

- College World Series Most Outstanding Player
- All-America First Team

Dave Engle

- All-Pacific-8 First Team

Brian Hayes

- All-Pacific-8 First Team

Dave Hostetler

- All-America Second Team
- College World Series All-Tournament Team

Chris Smith

- All-Pacific-8 First Team

Doug Stokke

- College World Series All-Tournament Team
- All-Pacific-8 First Team

Tim Tolman

- All-America Second Team
- College World Series All-Tournament Team
- All-Pacific-8 First Team

Dave Van Gorder

- All-America First Team

John Wells

- College World Series All-Tournament Team

== Trojans in the 1978 MLB draft ==
The following members of the USC baseball program were drafted in the 1978 Major League Baseball draft.

Player	Position	Round	Overall	MLB Team
Rod Boxberger	RHP	1st	11th	Houston Astros
Dave Van Gorder	C	2nd	43rd	Cincinnati Reds
Dave Engle	3B	3rd	66th	California Angels
Dave Hostetler	1B	4th	87th	Montreal Expos
Douglas Stokke	SS	5th	115th	Houston Astros
Chris Smith	OF	11th	280th	Texas Rangers
Tim Tolman	OF	12th	297th	Houston Astros
Jeff Schattinger	RHP	12th	300th	California Angels
Brian Hayes	LHP	16th	411th	Los Angeles Dodgers
Bob Skube	OF	18th	456th	St. Louis Cardinals
John Wells	OF	19th	470th	New York Mets
