= 1978 Southeastern Conference baseball tournament =

- Teams: 4
- Format: Four-team double elimination tournament
- Finals site: Perry Field; Gainesville, Florida
- Champions: Auburn (1st title)
- Winning coach: Paul Nix (1st title)

1978 Southeastern Conference baseball standings
| | Conf. | | | | Overall |
| Team | W | | L | PCT | W | | L | PCT |
|---|---|---|---|---|---|---|---|---|
Eastern Division
| Florida ^{x}‍‍‍ | 18 | – | 4 | .818 | 34 | – | 15 | .694 |
| Georgia ‍‍‍ | 11 | – | 12 | .478 | 30 | – | 19 | .612 |
| Tennessee ‍‍‍ | 11 | – | 12 | .478 | 25 | – | 21 | .543 |
| Vanderbilt ‍‍‍ | 10 | – | 13 | .435 | 31 | – | 17 | .646 |
| Kentucky ‍‍‍ | 6 | – | 15 | .286 | 20 | – | 25 | .444 |
Western Division
| No. 22 Auburn ^{x}‍‍‡‍^{y} | 15 | – | 8 | .652 | 33 | – | 21 | .611 |
| No. 14 Mississippi State ‍‍‍^{y} | 13 | – | 8 | .619 | 38 | – | 18 | .679 |
| Ole Miss ‍‍‍ | 12 | – | 11 | .522 | 27 | – | 21 | .563 |
| Alabama ‍‍‍ | 10 | – | 11 | .476 | 23 | – | 20 | .535 |
| LSU ‍‍‍ | 6 | – | 18 | .250 | 12 | – | 34 | .261 |
x – Division champion ‡ – Tournament champion y – Invited to the NCAA tournament As of June 30, 1978; Rankings from Collegiate Baseball

The 1978 Southeastern Conference baseball tournament was held at Perry Field in Gainesville, Florida, from May 12 through 15. Auburn won the tournament and earned the Southeastern Conference's automatic bid to the 1978 NCAA tournament.

== Regular-season results ==
| Team | W | L | Pct | GB | Seed |
|---|---|---|---|---|---|
Eastern Division
| Florida | 18 | 4 | .818 | — | 1 |
| Georgia | 11 | 12 | .478 | 7.5 | 4 |
| Tennessee | 11 | 12 | .478 | 7.5 | — |
| Vanderbilt | 10 | 13 | .435 | 8.5 | — |
| Kentucky | 6 | 15 | .286 | 11.5 | — |

| Team | W | L | Pct | GB | Seed |
|---|---|---|---|---|---|
Western Division
| Auburn | 15 | 8 | .652 | — | 2 |
| Mississippi State | 13 | 8 | .619 | 1 | 3 |
| Ole Miss | 12 | 11 | .522 | 3 | — |
| Alabama | 10 | 11 | .476 | 4 | — |
| LSU | 6 | 18 | .250 | 9.5 | — |

== Tournament ==
First round
4 | Georgia | 7
2 | Auburn | 8
3 | Mississippi State | 8
1 | Florida | 3
Lower round 1
4 | Georgia | 7
1 | Florida | 2

Semi-finals
2 | Auburn | 10
3 | Mississippi State | 7
Lower final
4 | Georgia | 3
3 | Mississippi State | 9

Finals
2 | Auburn | 2 | 8
3 | Mississippi State | 3 | 5

== All-Tournament Team ==
| Position | Player | School |
|---|---|---|
| 1B | Dom Fucci | Auburn |
| 2B | J.B. Brown | Auburn |
| 3B | John McDonald | Mississippi State |
| SS | Bubba Kizer | Georgia |
| C | Russ Aldrich | Mississippi State |
| OF | Del Bender | Mississippi State |
| OF | Jim Watkins | Florida |
| OF | Bubba Chrismer | Georgia |
| DH | Bo Fucci | Auburn |
| P | Jack Lazorko | Mississippi State |
| P | Perry Cliburn | Mississippi State |

No MVP was named.

== See also ==
- College World Series
- NCAA Division I Baseball Championship
- Southeastern Conference baseball tournament
