= 1978 Southwest Conference baseball tournament =

- Teams: 4
- Format: Double-elimination tournament
- Finals site: Disch–Falk Field; Austin, TX
- Champions: Baylor (2nd title)
- Winning coach: Mickey Sullivan (2nd title)

1978 Southwest Conference baseball standings
	Conf.				Overall
Team	W		L	PCT	W		L	PCT
No. 12 Texas A&M ‍†‍‍^{y}	19	–	5	.792	39	–	16	.709
No. 18 Arkansas ‍‍‍	18	–	6	.750	31	–	13	.705
No. 8 Baylor ‍‍‡‍^{y}	15	–	9	.625	32	–	19	.627
No. 13 Houston ‍‍‍	14	–	10	.583	30	–	21	.588
Texas ‍‍‍	12	–	12	.500	36	–	16	.692
SMU ‍‍‍	9	–	15	.375	25	–	29	.463
Texas Tech ‍‍‍	8	–	16	.333	23	–	25	.479
TCU ‍‍‍	7	–	17	.292	18	–	29	.383
Rice ‍‍‍	6	–	18	.250	18	–	29	.383
† – Conference champion ‡ – Tournament champion y – Invited to the NCAA tournament As of June 30, 1978; Rankings from Collegiate Baseball

The 1978 Southwest Conference baseball tournament was the league's annual postseason tournament used to determine the Southwest Conference's (SWC) automatic bid to the 1978 NCAA Division I baseball tournament. The tournament was held from May 12 through 14 at Disch–Falk Field on the campus of the University of Texas in Austin, Texas.

The number 3 seed Baylor Bears went 3–0 to win the team's second SWC tournament under head coach Mickey Sullivan.

== Format and seeding ==
The tournament featured the top four finishers of the SWC's nine teams in a double-elimination tournament.

Place	Team	Conference				Overall			Seed
Place	Team	W	L	%	GB	W	L	%	Seed
1	Texas A&M	19	5	.792	-	39	16	.709	1
2	Arkansas	18	6	.750	1	31	13	.705	2
3	Baylor	15	9	.625	4	32	19	.627	3
4	Houston	14	10	.583	5	30	21	.588	4
5	Texas	12	12	.500	7	36	16	.692	-
6	SMU	9	15	.375	10	25	29	.463	-
7	Texas Tech	8	16	.333	11	23	25	.479	-
8	TCU	7	17	.292	12	18	29	.383	-
9	Rice	6	18	.250	13	18	29	.383	-

== Tournament ==
Upper round 1
1	Texas A&M	6
4	Houston	8
2	Arkansas	0
3	Baylor	1
Lower round 1
1	Texas A&M	5
2	Arkansas	0

Upper final
4	Houston	4
3	Baylor	8
Lower final
4	Houston	17
1	Texas A&M	10

Final
3	Baylor	11	–
4	Houston	3	–
