= 1978 ACC tournament =

1978 ACC tournament may refer to:

- 1978 ACC men's basketball tournament
- 1978 ACC women's basketball tournament
- 1978 Atlantic Coast Conference baseball tournament
