= Todd Claus =

American baseball scout

- Scout
- Born: March 24, 1969 (age 57); Endicott, New York, U.S.
- Stats at Baseball Reference

Teams
- As manager: Cedar Rapids Kernels (2002–2003); Sarasota Red Sox (2004); Portland Sea Dogs (2005–2006)

Career highlights and awards
- Minor League Manager of the Year (2006)

Todd W. Claus (born March 24, 1969) is an American baseball scout. He also has been an infielder, coach, manager and advance scout in professional baseball, and an assistant coach in college baseball. A switch hitter who threw right-handed, Claus stands 5 ft 10 in (1.78 m) tall and weighs 170 lb (77 kg).

== Early years ==
Claus was born at Endicott, New York. He graduated from Cardinal Gibbons High School in Fort Lauderdale, Florida, and attended Seminole Community College, Indian River Community College and the University of North Florida, where he played varsity baseball and received a bachelor's degree in management.

== Baseball career ==
=== Minor league player ===
Claus signed with the California Angels (now the Los Angeles Angels) as a non-drafted free agent in 1991 and played three seasons of minor league baseball, primarily as a second baseman, and peaking in 1993 with 18 games and 42 at bats with the Midland Angels of the Double-A Texas League. Overall, he batted .204 in 549 professional at bats, with three home runs and 32 runs batted in.

=== Coach and manager ===
In 1994, he served as a graduate assistant coach with the University of North Florida, and attended the Major League Baseball Scouting Bureau's "scouts' school", where he graduated at the top of his class. He then rejoined the Angels as a scout and minor league coach with affiliates ranging from the Rookie level to Double-A.

Claus became a minor league manager in the Angel farm system in 2002 with the Cedar Rapids Kernels of the Class A Midwest League, where he won a division title and was cited by Baseball America as the Midwest circuit's top managing prospect. However, he was forced to leave the Angels after the 2003 season when he mistakenly sent a private voice mail supporting Donny Rowland, his mentor and the team's soon-to-be-fired scouting director, to everyone in the team's player development department.

In 2004 he moved to the Red Sox organization as manager of the Sarasota Red Sox of the Class A Florida State League. Then, in 2005 and 2006, he skippered the Portland Sea Dogs, Boston's Double-A Eastern League farm club, winning the 2006 Eastern League championship and Baseball America's Minor League Manager of the Year designation. His Portland clubs included prospects such as Hanley Ramírez, Dustin Pedroia, Jonathan Papelbon, Jon Lester, and Jacoby Ellsbury. Overall, as a minor league manager, his teams won 294 games, losing 258 (.533) with one championship.

=== Scout ===
In 2007 and 2008, Claus served as one of the MLB Red Sox' two advance scouts (with Dana LeVangie). Claus' and LeVangie's scouting reports were credited with helping Boston win the 2007 American League title and 2007 World Series. Following the 2008 season, which saw Boston fall in Game 7 of the 2008 American League Championship Series, Claus left the professional baseball ranks to become the assistant baseball coach of Jacksonville University of Jacksonville, Florida. After spending the 2009 season in that post, he rejoined Boston as a member of its international scouting group on November 11, 2009, as the club's Latin American scouting coordinator and international cross-checker. In 2017, the Red Sox promoted him to global scouting supervisor.

Preceded by Ron Johnson	Portland Sea Dogs Manager; 2005–2006	Succeeded by Arnie Beyeler
