= 1978 Michigan Wolverines baseball team =

American college baseball season

1978 Michigan Wolverines baseball

Big Ten Conference

College World Series, T-5th
- Conference: Big Ten Conference

Ranking
- Coaches: No. 6
- CB: No. 6
- Record: 30–17 (13–3 Big Ten)
- Head coach: Moby Benedict (16th season)
- MVPs: Steve Howe; Rick Leach
- Home stadium: Ray Fisher Stadium

1978 Big Ten Conference baseball standings
| | Conf. | | | | | | Overall |
| Team | W | | L | | T | PCT | W | | L | | T | PCT |
|---|---|---|---|---|---|---|---|---|---|---|---|---|
| No. 6 Michigan ‍†‍‍^{y} | 13 | – | 3 | – | 0 | .813 | 30 | – | 17 | – | 0 | .638 |
| Michigan State ‍‍‍ | 11 | – | 5 | – | 0 | .688 | 33 | – | 21 | – | 0 | .611 |
| Wisconsin ‍‍‍ | 10 | – | 6 | – | 0 | .625 | 23 | – | 21 | – | 1 | .522 |
| Iowa ‍‍‍ | 9 | – | 6 | – | 0 | .600 | 28 | – | 17 | – | 0 | .622 |
| Minnesota ‍‍‍ | 7 | – | 7 | – | 0 | .500 | 25 | – | 17 | – | 0 | .595 |
| Ohio State ‍‍‍ | 9 | – | 9 | – | 0 | .500 | 24 | – | 23 | – | 0 | .511 |
| Indiana ‍‍‍ | 5 | – | 8 | – | 0 | .385 | 20 | – | 23 | – | 0 | .465 |
| Northwestern ‍‍‍ | 6 | – | 10 | – | 0 | .375 | 17 | – | 18 | – | 1 | .486 |
| Illinois ‍‍‍ | 6 | – | 12 | – | 0 | .333 | 25 | – | 22 | – | 1 | .531 |
| Purdue ‍‍‍ | 3 | – | 13 | – | 0 | .188 | 16 | – | 26 | – | 0 | .381 |
† – Conference champion y – Invited to the NCAA tournament As of June 30, 1978; Rankings from Collegiate Baseball

The 1978 Michigan Wolverines baseball team represented the University of Michigan in the 1978 NCAA Division I baseball season. The head coach was Moby Benedict, serving his 16th year. The Wolverines finished the season in 5th place in the 1978 College World Series.

== Roster ==
1978 Michigan Wolverines baseball team
Players
Coaches

| # | Pos. | Name | B/T | Height | Weight | Year | Home town |
|---|---|---|---|---|---|---|---|
| | | Scott Anderson | / | — | — |
| | | James Berra | / | — | — | Sr |
| | | Michael Bryant | / | — | — |
| | | James Capoferi | / | — | — |
| | RHP | David Chapman | R/R | 5 ft 10 in (1.78 m) | 170 lb (77 kg) | Sr |
| | RHP | Mark Clinton | /R | 6 ft 1 in (1.85 m) | 185 lb (84 kg) | Fr |
| | | Daniel Cooperrider | / | — | — |
| | | Andrew Deacon | / | — | — |
| | INF | George Foussianes | R/R | 6 ft 1 in (1.85 m) | 190 lb (86 kg) | So |
| | | Frederick Henderson | / | — | — |
| | C | Gerald Hool | R/R | — | — | Fr |
| | LHP | Steve Howe | L/L | 6 ft 1 in (1.85 m) | 180 lb (82 kg) | So | Pontiac, Michigan |
| | OF | Rick Leach | L/L | 6 ft 1 in (1.85 m) | 180 lb (82 kg) | Jr | Ann Arbor, Michigan |
| | | Dale Mason | / | — | — |
| | | John McEldowney | / | — | — |
| | | Craig McGinnis | / | — | — | Sr |
| | RHP | Thomas Owens | R/R | 6 ft 4 in (1.93 m) | 195 lb (88 kg) | | Flint, Michigan |
| | INF | Michael Parker | R/R | 6 ft 0 in (1.83 m) | 190 lb (86 kg) |
| | RHP | Stephen Perry | R/R | 6 ft 5 in (1.96 m) | 210 lb (95 kg) | Jr |
| | | Vic Ray | / | — | — |
| | | William Stennett | / | — | — | Sr |
| | | Michael Thomas | / | — | — |
| | | W. M. Thompson | / | — | — |
| | | Robert Wasilewski | / | — | — | Sr |
| | | Randal Wroten | / | — | — | Fr |

Head coach

Moby Benedict

Assistant coach(es)

Legend

- (C) Team captain
- (S) Suspended
- (I) Ineligible
- Injured
- Current redshirt

== Schedule ==
1978 Michigan Wolverines baseball game log
Regular season
March (6–5)

| # | Date | Opponent | Site/stadium | Score | Overall record | Big Ten record |
|---|---|---|---|---|---|---|
| 1 | March 4 | vs Iowa State | Unknown • Unknown | 9–2 | 1–0 | 0–0 |
| 2 | March 5 | vs Western Michigan | Unknown • Unknown | 2–11 | 1–1 | 0–0 |
| 3 | March 5 | vs Iowa State | Unknown • Unknown | 7–3 | 2–1 | 0–0 |
| 4 | March 6 | vs Missouri | Unknown • Unknown | 1–3 | 2–2 | 0–0 |
| 5 | March 7 | vs Missouri | Unknown • Unknown | 6–4 | 3–2 | 0–0 |
| 6 | March 7 | at South Florida | Red McEwen Field • Tampa, Florida | 3–2 | 4–2 | 0–0 |
| 7 | March 8 | vs Florida Southern | Joker Marchant Stadium • Lakeland, Florida | 1–8 | 4–3 | 0–0 |
| 8 | March 10 | vs Temple | Unknown • Unknown | 8–9 | 4–4 | 0–0 |
| 9 | March 11 | vs Florida Southern | Unknown • Unknown | 7–8 | 4–5 | 0–0 |
| 10 | March 11 | vs Missouri | Unknown • Unknown | 8–5 | 5–5 | 0–0 |
| 11 | March 12 | vs Western Michigan | Unknown • Unknown | 7–3 | 6–5 | 0–0 |

April (10–6)

| # | Date | Opponent | Site/stadium | Score | Overall record | Big Ten record |
|---|---|---|---|---|---|---|
| 12 | April 7 | vs Bowling Green | Unknown • Unknown | 1–5 | 6–6 | 0–0 |
| 13 | April 8 | vs Bowling Green | Unknown • Unknown | 4–1 | 7–6 | 0–0 |
| 14 | April 12 | vs Detroit | Unknown • Unknown | 0–2 | 7–7 | 0–0 |
| 15 | April 12 | vs Detroit | Unknown • Unknown | 0–3 | 7–8 | 0–0 |
| 16 | April 15 | at Wisconsin | Guy Lowman Field • Madison, Wisconsin | 5–1 | 8–8 | 1–0 |
| 17 | April 15 | at Wisconsin | Guy Lowman Field • Madison, Wisconsin | 6–4 | 9–8 | 2–0 |
| 18 | April 16 | at Minnesota | Bierman Field • Minneapolis, Minnesota | 3–2 | 10–8 | 3–0 |
| 19 | April 16 | at Minnesota | Bierman Field • Minneapolis, Minnesota | 13–7 | 11–8 | 4–0 |
| 20 | April 19 | vs Western Michigan | Unknown • Unknown | 2–3 | 11–9 | 4–0 |
| 21 | April 19 | vs Western Michigan | Unknown • Unknown | 5–3 | 12–9 | 4–0 |
| 22 | April 23 | vs Eastern Michigan | Unknown • Unknown | 8–0 | 13–9 | 4–0 |
| 23 | April 23 | vs Eastern Michigan | Unknown • Unknown | 1–2 | 13–10 | 4–0 |
| 24 | April 29 | Illinois | Ray Fisher Stadium • Ann Arbor, Michigan | 10–0 | 14–10 | 5–0 |
| 25 | April 29 | Illinois | Ray Fisher Stadium • Ann Arbor, Michigan | 3–0 | 15–10 | 6–0 |
| 26 | April 30 | Purdue | Ray Fisher Stadium • Ann Arbor, Michigan | 2–4 | 15–11 | 6–1 |
| 27 | April 30 | Purdue | Ray Fisher Stadium • Ann Arbor, Michigan | 6–5 | 16–11 | 7–1 |

May (10–4)

| # | Date | Opponent | Site/stadium | Score | Overall record | Big Ten record |
|---|---|---|---|---|---|---|
| 28 | May 3 | at Notre Dame | Unknown • Notre Dame, Indiana | 4–0 | 17–11 | 7–1 |
| 29 | May 3 | at Notre Dame | Unknown • Notre Dame, Indiana | 6–0 | 18–11 | 7–1 |
| 30 | May 6 | Indiana | Ray Fisher Stadium • Ann Arbor, Michigan | 9–1 | 19–11 | 8–1 |
| 31 | May 6 | Indiana | Ray Fisher Stadium • Ann Arbor, Michigan | 5–1 | 20–11 | 9–1 |
| 32 | May 7 | Ohio State | Ray Fisher Stadium • Ann Arbor, Michigan | 4–2 | 21–11 | 10–1 |
| 33 | May 7 | Ohio State | Ray Fisher Stadium • Ann Arbor, Michigan | 12–1 | 22–11 | 11–1 |
| 34 | May 10 | vs Eastern Michigan | Unknown • Unknown | 3–2 | 23–11 | 11–1 |
| 35 | May 10 | vs Eastern Michigan | Unknown • Unknown | 5–4 | 24–11 | 11–1 |
| 36 | May 14 | vs Iowa | Unknown • Unknown | 10–1 | 25–11 | 12–1 |
| 37 | May 14 | vs Iowa | Unknown • Unknown | 0–1 | 25–12 | 12–2 |
| 38 | May 17 | vs Wayne State | Unknown • Unknown | 2–4 | 25–13 | 12–2 |
| 39 | May 17 | vs Wayne State | Unknown • Unknown | 3–8 | 25–14 | 12–2 |
| 40 | May 20 | at Michigan State | John H. Kobs Field • East Lansing, Michigan | 5–10 | 25–15 | 12–3 |
| 41 | May 21 | Michigan State | Ray Fisher Stadium • Ann Arbor, Michigan | 3–0 | 26–15 | 13–3 |

Postseason
Mideast Regional (3–0)

| # | Date | Opponent | Site/stadium | Score | Overall record | Big Ten record |
|---|---|---|---|---|---|---|
| 42 | May 26 | Texas A&M | Ray Fisher Stadium • Ann Arbor, Michigan | 8–1 | 27–15 | 13–3 |
| 43 | May 27 | Eastern Michigan | Ray Fisher Stadium • Ann Arbor, Michigan | 6–4 | 28–15 | 13–3 |
| 44 | May 28 | Texas A&M | Ray Fisher Stadium • Ann Arbor, Michigan | 3–0 | 29–15 | 13–3 |

1978 College World Series (1–2)

| # | Date | Opponent | Site/stadium | Score | Overall record | Big Ten record |
|---|---|---|---|---|---|---|
| 45 | June 2 | vs Baylor | Johnny Rosenblatt Stadium • Omaha, Nebraska | 4–0 | 30–15 | 13–3 |
| 46 | June 4 | vs USC | Johnny Rosenblatt Stadium • Omaha, Nebraska | 3–11 | 30–16 | 13–3 |
| 47 | June 5 | vs North Carolina | Johnny Rosenblatt Stadium • Omaha, Nebraska | 6–7 | 30–17 | 13–3 |
