= 1978 Atlantic Coast Conference baseball tournament =

American college baseball tournament

- Teams: 7
- Format: Seven-team double-elimination tournament
- Finals site: Beautiful Tiger Field; Clemson, South Carolina
- Champions: Clemson (2nd title)
- Winning coach: Bill Wilhelm (2nd title)
- Attendance: 8,300

1978 Atlantic Coast Conference baseball standings
	Conf.				Overall
Team	W		L	PCT	W		L	PCT
No. 25 Clemson ‍†‍‡‍^{y}	10	–	2	.833	39	–	14	.736
No. 3 North Carolina ‍‍‍^{y}	9	–	3	.750	38	–	17	.691
Wake Forest ‍‍‍	7	–	5	.583	23	–	14	.622
Maryland ‍‍‍	5	–	6	.455	14	–	14	.500
NC State ‍‍‍	5	–	7	.417	23	–	16	.590
Virginia ‍‍‍	4	–	8	.333	18	–	14	.563
Duke ‍‍‍	1	–	10	.091	12	–	22	.353
† – Conference champion ‡ – Tournament champion y – Invited to the NCAA tournament As of June 30, 1978; Rankings from Collegiate Baseball

The 1978 Atlantic Coast Conference baseball tournament was held at Beautiful Tiger Field in Clemson, SC from April 20 through April 24. Clemson won the tournament and earned the Atlantic Coast Conference's automatic bid to the 1978 NCAA Division I baseball tournament.

== Tournament ==
Play-in round (single elim.)	Upper round 2	Upper final	Championship
1	Clemson	12
5	NC State	1
4	Maryland	2
5	NC State	7
1	Clemson	13
7	Duke	0
6	Virginia	2
3	Wake Forest	16
3	Wake Forest	3
7	Duke	4
7	Duke	3
2	North Carolina	2
3	Wake Forest	2	—
1	Clemson	7	—
Lower round 1	Lower final
7	Duke	3
3	Wake Forest	6	3	Wake Forest	4
5	NC State	3

== See also ==
- College World Series
- NCAA Division I Baseball Championship
