= 1978 St. John's Redmen baseball team =

University baseball team

1978 St. John's Redmen baseball

Northeast Regional champions

College World Series, T–7th
- Conference: Independent
- Record: 40–18
- Head coach: Joe Russo (5th season)
- Assistant coaches: Ed Mathes; Bill Permakoff
- Pitching coach: Howie Gershberg
- Captains: Tom Cipolla; Ed D'Alessio
- Home stadium: Redman Field

The 1978 St. John's Redmen baseball team represented the St. John's University in the 1978 NCAA Division I baseball season. The Redmen played their home games at Redman Field. The team was coached by Joe Russo in his 5th year at St. John's.

The Redmen won the Northeast Regional to advance to the College World Series, where they were defeated by the North Carolina Tar Heels.

== Roster ==
1978 St. John's Redmen baseball team
Players
Coaches

#	Pos.	Name	B/T	Height	Weight	Year	Home town
14	LHP	Patrick Ambrose	R/L	5 ft 10 in (1.78 m)	170 lb (77 kg)	Fr	Staten Island, NY
18	RHP	Steve Babyak	R/R	6 ft 0 in (1.83 m)	160 lb (73 kg)	Jr	N. Massapequa, NY
		Michael Beatrice	/	—	—	Sr
20	RHP	Steve Bingham	R/R	6 ft 1 in (1.85 m)	190 lb (86 kg)	So	Wantagh, NY
	OF	John Blair	/	—	—		Newburgh, NY
		Anthony Bonomo	/	—	—	So	Brooklyn, NY
21	C	Sebby Borriello	R/R	6 ft 1 in (1.85 m)	195 lb (88 kg)	Fr
	OF	Frank Caporaso	R/R	—	—	So
3	INF	Tom Cipolla (C)	R/R	5 ft 11 in (1.8 m)	165 lb (75 kg)	Sr	Sayville, NY
		William Crinnon	/	—	—
		James Curran	/	—	—	Sr
32	INF	Ed D'Alessio (C)	R/R	5 ft 10 in (1.78 m)	170 lb (77 kg)	Sr	Brooklyn, NY
		John Gallaro	/	—	—
5	OF	David Goldberg	L/L	5 ft 11 in (1.8 m)	165 lb (75 kg)		Brooklyn, NY
		Anton Grim	/	—	—
	INF	Robert Grim	R/R	—	—
7	INF	T Hayes	R/R	6 ft 2 in (1.88 m)	180 lb (82 kg)	Fr	Commack, NY
29	RHP	Richard Hille	R/R	6 ft 4 in (1.93 m)	200 lb (91 kg)	Sr	Richmond Hill, NY
	RHP	Mike Hoffman	R/R	—	—
	C	Mike Kerrigan	R/R	—	—
27	RHP	Ronald Kiene	R/R	6 ft 3 in (1.91 m)	175 lb (79 kg)	Fr	Brooklyn, NY
17	INF	Karl Komyathy	R/R	6 ft 1 in (1.85 m)	185 lb (84 kg)	Fr	Hauppauge, NY
23	RHP	Gregory LaCasse	R/R	6 ft 3 in (1.91 m)	185 lb (84 kg)	So	W. Hempstead, NY
4	OF	Doug Latrenta	L/L	5 ft 10 in (1.78 m)	175 lb (79 kg)	So	Smithtown, NY
16	INF	James Loeffler	R/R	6 ft 1 in (1.85 m)	165 lb (75 kg)	Jr	Ozone Park, NY
	INF	Robert Malvagna	R/R	—	—	Jr
	INF	Tom Marasa	R/R	6 ft 1 in (1.85 m)	170 lb (77 kg)	So	Flushing, NY
	C	James Marciano	R/R	—	—
	OF	Paul Maruffi	R/R	5 ft 9 in (1.75 m)	170 lb (77 kg)	Fr	Brooklyn, NY
	INF	Kevin McCabe	R/R	—	—	So
22	RHP	Vincent Merolla	R/R	6 ft 3 in (1.91 m)	200 lb (91 kg)	So	Brooklyn, NY
31	C	Cliff Morello	R/R	5 ft 10 in (1.78 m)	190 lb (86 kg)	So	Plainview, NY
8	OF	Ron Naclerio	L/L	5 ft 10 in (1.78 m)	165 lb (75 kg)	So	Bayside, NY
19	INF	James O'Connor	L/R	6 ft 1 in (1.85 m)	170 lb (77 kg)	Jr	Bayside, NY
34	RHP	Chris Rich	R/R	6 ft 7 in (2.01 m)	175 lb (79 kg)	Fr	Levittown, NY
1	INF	Steve Scafa	S/R	5 ft 9 in (1.75 m)	165 lb (75 kg)	Fr	Brooklyn, NY
	RHP	Jon Schmidt	R/R	—	—
	LHP	James Sepanski	L/L	6 ft 0 in (1.83 m)	180 lb (82 kg)	Sr	Middle Village, NY
		William Smith	/	—	—
37	C	Ed Strollo	R/R	5 ft 10 in (1.78 m)	180 lb (82 kg)		Astoria, N.Y.
37	INF	Donald Troyan	L/L	6 ft 7 in (2.01 m)	215 lb (98 kg)	Jr	Aquebogue, NY

Head coach

Joe Russo

Assistant coach(es)

Ed Mathes, Bill Permakoff

Pitching coach(es)

Howie Gershberg

Legend

- (C) Team captain
- (S) Suspended
- (I) Ineligible
- Injured
- Current redshirt

== Schedule ==
1978 St. John's Redmen baseball game log
Regular season
March (6–3)

#	Date	Opponent	Site/stadium	Score	Overall record
1	March 23	at Georgia	Foley Field • Athens, Georgia	4–5	0–1
2	March 23	at Georgia	Foley Field • Athens, Georgia	13–11	1–1
3	March 24	at Furman	Furman Baseball Field • Greenville, South Carolina	5–3	2–1
4	March 27	at Wake Forest	Ernie Shore Field • Winston-Salem, North Carolina	3–2	3–1
5	March 28	at North Carolina Tar Heels	Boshamer Stadium • Chapel Hill, North Carolina	15–5	4–1
6	March 30	at Old Dominion	Unknown • Norfolk, Virginia	0–1	4–2
7	March 30	at Old Dominion	Unknown • Norfolk, Virginia	3–6	4–3
8	March 31	at VCU	Unknown • Richmond, Virginia	11–0	5–3
9	March 31	at VCU	Unknown • Richmond, Virginia	9–2	6–3

April (20–8)

#	Date	Opponent	Site/stadium	Score	Overall record
10	April 1	at Richmond	Malcolm U. Pitt Field • Richmond, Virginia	16–3	7–3
11	April 1	at Richmond	Malcolm U. Pitt Field • Richmond	3–2	8–3
12	April 3	at Hofstra	University Field • Hempstead, New York	19–2	9–3
13	April 4	at Pace	Unknown • New York, New York	15–7	10–3
14	April 5	at Seton Hall	Owen T. Carroll Field • South Orange, New Jersey	7–1	11–3
15	April 6	Brooklyn	Redman Field • New York, New York	5–1	12–3
16	April 8	Siena	Redman Field • New York, New York	27–8	13–3
17	April 8	Siena	Redman Field • New York, New York	15–7	14–3
18	April 9	at Southern Connecticut State	Unknown • New Haven, Connecticut	10–8	15–3
19	April 10	Adelphi	Redman Field • New York, New York	1–3	15–4
20	April 11	Wagner	Redman Field • New York, New York	4–5	15–5
21	April 12	Rutgers	Redman Field • New York, New York	6–8	15–6
22	April 13	at Fairleigh Dickinson	Unknown • Teaneck, New Jersey	15–2	16–6
23	April 14	New Haven	Redman Field • New York, New York	5–4	17–6
24	April 15	Catholic	Redman Field • New York, New York	3–1	18–6
25	April 15	Catholic	Redman Field • New York, New York	8–11	18–7
26	April 16	Seton Hall	Redman Field • New York, New York	0–7	18–8
27	April 17	Buffalo	Redman Field • New York, New York	9–0	19–8
28	April 18	at Columbia	Robertson Field at Satow Stadium • New York, New York	0–10	19–9
29	April 21	at Adelphi	Unknown • Garden City, New York	4–8	19–10
30	April 22	LIU Brooklyn	Redman Field • New York, New York	6–0	20–10
31	April 23	at Temple	Erny Field • Philadelphia, Pennsylvania	10–8	21–10
32	April 24	Army	Redman Field • New York, New York	6–1	22–10
33	April 25	Bridgeport	Redman Field • New York, New York	15–2	23–10
34	April 26	Iona	Redman Field • New York, New York	11–0	24–10
35	April 27	Fairleigh Dickinson	Redman Field • New York, New York	13–10	25–10
36	April 29	at Penn State	Beaver Field • University Park, Pennsylvania	5–6	25–11
37	April 29	at Penn State	Beaver Field • University Park, Pennsylvania	10–9	26–11

May (5–3)

#	Date	Opponent	Site/stadium	Score	Overall record
38	May 1	at Connecticut	J. O. Christian Field • Storrs, Connecticut	5–7	26–12
39	May 2	West Chester	Redman Field • New York, New York	11–4	27–12
40	May 3	CCNY	Redman Field • New York, New York	7–2	28–12
41	May 4	Fordham	Redman Field • New York, New York	1–3	28–13
42	May 7	at C.W. Post	LIU Baseball Stadium • New York, New York	2–3	28–14
43	May 13	Queens	Redman Field • New York, New York	2–1	29–14
44	May 13	Queens	Redman Field • New York, New York	7–2	30–14
45	May 15	Princeton	Redman Field • New York, New York	4–2	31–14

Postseason
ECAC Tournament (4–1)

#	Date	Opponent	Site/stadium	Score	Overall record
46	May	vs Richmond	Bill Clarke Field• Princeton, NJ	7–2	32–14
47	May	vs Cornell	Bill Clarke Field• Princeton, NJ	4–5	32–15
48	May	vs Richmond	Bill Clarke Field• Princeton, NJ	2–1	33–15
49	May	vs Cornell	Bill Clarke Field• Princeton, NJ	2–0	34–15
50	May	vs Cornell	Bill Clarke Field• Princeton, NJ	10–1	35–15

Northeast Regional (5–1)

#	Date	Opponent	Site/stadium	Score	Overall record
51	May	vs Holy Cross	Mackenzie Stadium • Holyoke, Massachusetts	3–5	35–16
52	May	vs Harvard	Mackenzie Stadium • Holyoke, Massachusetts	8–0	36–16
53	May	vs Holy Cross	Mackenzie Stadium • Holyoke, Massachusetts	14–12	37–16
54	May	vs Delaware	Mackenzie Stadium • Holyoke, Massachusetts	7–4	38–16
55	May 28	vs Temple	Mackenzie Stadium • Holyoke, Massachusetts	8–5	39–16
56	May 28	vs Temple	Mackenzie Stadium • Holyoke, Massachusetts	15–6	40–16

College World Series (0–2)

#	Date	Opponent	Site/stadium	Score	Overall record
57	June 2	vs Arizona State	Johnny Rosenblatt Stadium • Omaha, Nebraska	2–13	40–17
58	June 3	vs North Carolina	Johnny Rosenblatt Stadium • Omaha, Nebraska	5–9	40–18
