= 1978 Arizona Wildcats baseball team =

American college baseball season

1978 Arizona Wildcats baseball

West Regional
- Conference: Western Athletic Conference
- CB: No. 10
- Record: 42–13 (13–5 WAC)
- Head coach: Jerry Kindall (6th season)
- Assistant coach: Jim Wing (6th season)
- Home stadium: Wildcat Field

1978 Western Athletic Conference baseball standings
	Conf.				Overall
Team	W		L	PCT	W		L	PCT
Northern
BYU ^{x}‍‍‍	16	–	2	.889	37	–	15	.712
Wyoming ‍‍‍	8	–	10	.444	35	–	24	.593
Colorado State ‍‍‍	6	–	12	.333	20	–	26	.435
Utah ‍‍‍	6	–	12	.333	8	–	27	.229
Southern
No. 2 Arizona State ^{x}‍‍‡‍^{y}	15	–	3	.833	56	–	12	.824
Arizona ‍‍‍^{y}	13	–	5	.722	42	–	13	.764
New Mexico ‍‍‍	5	–	12	.294	31	–	24	.564
UTEP ‍‍‍	2	–	15	.118	26	–	26	.500
x – Division champion ‡ – Championship Series champion y – Invited to the NCAA tournament As of June 30, 1978; Rankings from Collegiate Baseball

The 1978 Arizona Wildcats baseball team represented the University of Arizona during the 1978 NCAA Division I baseball season. The Wildcats played their home games at Wildcat Field. The team was coached by Jerry Kindall in his 6th season at Arizona. The Wildcats finished 42-13 overall and placed 2nd in the Western Athletic Conference's Southern Division with a 13–5 record. After a single year gap, Arizona was selected to the postseason and was placed in the West Regional hosted by the University of Southern California at Dedeaux Field in Los Angeles, California. The Wildcats lost their 1st game to USC before bouncing back to win their next 2 against Santa Clara and Cal State Fullerton. The team however lost their next game - a rematch with USC - to end their season. This would be Arizona's final season as members of the Western Athletic Conference, which they had been affiliated with for the previous 16 seasons. Beginning in 1979, the Wildcats would compete as members of the Pacific-10 Conference (later Pac-12 Conference) for the next 45 seasons, which they would remain in until leaving for the Big 12 Conference in 2024.

== Previous season ==
The Wildcats finished the 1977 season with a record of 38-25-1 and 11–7 in conference play, finishing 2nd in the WAC Southern. Arizona would miss the postseason for the 1st time since Jerry Kindall's inaugural 1973 season.

== Personnel ==
=== Roster ===
1978 Arizona Wildcats baseball roster
• Mark Arnold • Robin Carlsen • Craig Chamberlain • Robert Chaulk • David Crutcher • David Fortman • Terry Francona	• James Harskamp • Anthony Incavaglia • Gary Johnson • Bill Kinneberg • Craig Lefferts • Rick McConnell • Raymond Manship • Brad Mills • James Morley	• Ray Murillo • Virgel Overlund • Les Pearsey • John Rodriguez • Randy Roeder • Scott Stanley • Robert Woodside • Chuck Zopfi

=== Coaches ===
1978 Arizona Wildcats baseball coaching staff
- Jerry Kindall - Head coach
- Jim Wing - Assistant coach

== 1978 Schedule and results ==
1978 Arizona Wildcats baseball game log
Regular season
Date	Opponent	Site/Stadium	Score	Overall Record	WAC Record
Feb 10	Cal State Fullerton	Wildcat Field • Tucson, AZ	W 8-3	1-0	
Feb 13	UC Santa Barbara	Wildcat Field • Tucson, AZ	W 11-2	2-0	
Feb 15	UC Santa Barbara	Wildcat Field • Tucson, AZ	L 0-5	2-1	
Feb 15	UC Santa Barbara	Wildcat Field • Tucson, AZ	W 3-2	3-1	
Feb 17	Loyola Marymount	Wildcat Field • Tucson, AZ	W 4-2	4-1	
Feb 18	Loyola Marymount	Wildcat Field • Tucson, AZ	W 6-2	5-1	
Feb 18	Loyola Marymount	Wildcat Field • Tucson, AZ	W 11-6	6-1	
Feb 20	Azusa Pacific	Wildcat Field • Tucson, AZ	W 23-7	7-1	
Feb 21	Azusa Pacific	Wildcat Field • Tucson, AZ	L 0-4	7-2	
Feb 24	UCLA	Wildcat Field • Tucson, AZ	W 3-0	8-2	
Feb 25	UCLA	Wildcat Field • Tucson, AZ	W 5-3	9-2	
Feb 25	UCLA	Wildcat Field • Tucson, AZ	W 6-3	10-2	
Feb 28	Cal State Dominguez Hills	Wildcat Field • Tucson, AZ	W 4-3	11-2	
Feb 28	Cal State Dominguez Hills	Wildcat Field • Tucson, AZ	W 10-2	12-2	
Mar 6	Grand Canyon	Wildcat Field • Tucson, AZ	W 8-3	13-2	
Mar 7	at Grand Canyon	Brazell Field • Phoenix, AZ	W 12-3	14-2	
Mar 9	La Verne	Wildcat Field • Tucson, AZ	W 12-1	15-2	
Mar 10	La Verne	Wildcat Field • Tucson, AZ	W 6-4	16-2	
Mar 11	La Verne	Wildcat Field • Tucson, AZ	W 8-4	17-2	
Mar 15	at Arizona State	Packard Stadium • Tempe, AZ	L 1-8	17-3	
Mar 16	Northern Arizona	Wildcat Field • Tucson, AZ	W 9-0	18-3	
Mar 17	Eastern Michigan	Wildcat Field • Tucson, AZ	W 20-1	19-3	
Mar 18	Grand Canyon	Wildcat Field • Tucson, AZ	W 4-2	20-3	
Mar 19	Arizona State	Wildcat Field • Tucson, AZ	L 4-7	20-4	
Mar 22	at Tulane	Tulane Diamond • New Orleans, LA	W 6-0	21-4	
Mar 22	at Tulane	Tulane Diamond • New Orleans, LA	W 5-4	22-4	
Mar 24	at Mississippi State	Dudy Noble Field • Starkville, MS	L 6-9	22-5	
Mar 25	vs Mississippi State	Smith-Wills Stadium • Jackson, MS	W 5-2	23-5	
Mar 26	vs Mississippi State	Smith-Wills Stadium • Jackson, MS	L 3-4	23-6	
Mar 30	Northern Arizona	Wildcat Field • Tucson, AZ	W 7-4	24-6	
Mar 31	Northern Arizona	Wildcat Field • Tucson, AZ	W 13-1	25-6	
Apr 1	Northern Arizona	Wildcat Field • Tucson, AZ	W 15-3	26-6	
Apr 7	at New Mexico	Lobo Field • Albuquerque, NM	W 10-8	27-6	1-0
Apr 8	at New Mexico	Lobo Field • Albuquerque, NM	W 12-4	28-6	2-0
Apr 8	at New Mexico	Lobo Field • Albuquerque, NM	W 12-4	29-6	3-0
Apr 14	UTEP	Wildcat Field • Tucson, AZ	W 12-1	30-6	4-0
Apr 15	UTEP	Wildcat Field • Tucson, AZ	L 7-11	30-7	4-1
Apr 15	UTEP	Wildcat Field • Tucson, AZ	W 7-3	31-7	5-1
Apr 20	at Arizona State	Packard Stadium • Tempe, AZ	L 9-15	31-8	5-2
Apr 21	at Arizona State	Packard Stadium • Tempe, AZ	L 8-10	31-9	5-3
Apr 22	at Arizona State	Packard Stadium • Tempe, AZ	L 10-11	31-10	5-4
Apr 28	at UTEP	Dudley Field • El Paso, TX	W 11-0	32-10	6-4
Apr 29	at UTEP	Dudley Field • El Paso, TX	W 8-3	33-10	7-4
Apr 29	at UTEP	Dudley Field • El Paso, TX	W 7-2	34-10	8-4
May 5	New Mexico	Wildcat Field • Tucson, AZ	W 4-3	35-10	9-4
May 7	New Mexico	Wildcat Field • Tucson, AZ	W 9-6	36-10	10-4
May 7	New Mexico	Wildcat Field • Tucson, AZ	W 12-3	37-10	11-4
May 11	Arizona State	Wildcat Field • Tucson, AZ	W 5-3	38-10	12-4
May 12	Arizona State	Wildcat Field • Tucson, AZ	W 10-7	39-10	13-4
May 13	Arizona State	Wildcat Field • Tucson, AZ	L 6-11	39-11	13-5
May 20	BYU	Wildcat Field • Tucson, AZ	W 8-4	40-11	
NCAA West Regional
May 26	at USC	Dedeaux Field • Los Angeles, CA	L 2-3	40-12	
May 27	vs Santa Clara	Dedeaux Field • Los Angeles, CA	W 13-5	41-12	
May 28	vs Cal State Fullerton	Dedeaux Field • Los Angeles, CA	W 7-3	42-12	
May 28	at USC	Dedeaux Field • Los Angeles, CA	L 1-2	42-13	

=== West Regional ===
West Regional Teams
Cal State Fullerton Titans	Santa Clara Broncos	USC Trojans	Arizona Wildcats

== 1978 MLB draft ==
Player	Position	Round	Overall	MLB team
David Crutcher	RHP	3	72	Texas Rangers
Les Pearsey	INF	8	198	Minnesota Twins
Ray Murillo	RHP	11	278	Chicago White Sox
Raymond Manship	RHP	28	651	Milwaukee Brewers
Craig Chamberlain	RHP	1 (6sc)	2	Kansas City Royals
