= 1978 Miami Hurricanes baseball team =

American college baseball season

1978 Miami Hurricanes baseball

NCAA Atlantic Regional champions

College World Series, 2–2
- Conference: Independent
- Record: 50–12
- Head coach: Ron Fraser (16th year)
- Home stadium: Mark Light Field

1978 NCAA Division I baseball independents standings
	Conf.				Overall
Team	W		L	PCT	W		L	PCT
No. 4 Miami (FL) ‍‍‍^{y}		–		–	50	–	12	.806
No. 28 Hawaii ‍‍‍		–		–	38	–	14	.731
No. 11 Gonzaga ‍‍‍^{y}		–		–	33	–	14	.702
Detroit ‍‍‍		–		–	33	–	16	.673
Mercer ‍‍‍		–		–	32	–	16	.667
Stetson ‍‍‍		–		–	33	–	17	.660
Richmond ‍‍‍		–		–	21	–	12	.636
Virginia Tech ‍‍‍		–		–	27	–	17	.614
Air Force ‍‍‍		–		–	22	–	15	.595
Northern Iowa ‍‍‍		–		–	17	–	16	.515
Lafayette ‍‍‍		–		–	11	–	12	.478
Campbell ‍‍‍		–		–	12	–	15	.444
Villanova ‍‍‍		–		–	11	–	18	.379
Notre Dame ‍‍‍		–		–	12	–	25	.324
Hofstra ‍‍‍		–		–	7	–	18	.280
y – Invited to the NCAA tournament As of June 30, 1978; Rankings from Collegiate Baseball

The 1978 Miami Hurricanes baseball team represented the University of Miami in the 1978 NCAA Division I baseball season. The Hurricanes played their home games at Mark Light Field. The team was coached by Ron Fraser in his 16th season at Miami.

The Hurricanes reached the College World Series, where they recorded wins against Baylor and Oral Roberts and losses to eventual champion Southern California and runner-up Arizona State.

== Personnel ==
=== Roster ===
1978 Miami Hurricanes roster
Pitchers: Mark Batten; Randy Guerra; Jeff Morrison; Augie Ruiz; Tony Vila; Catchers	Infielders Outfielders: Tony Brewer; Matt Tyner	Unknown: Humberto Acosta; Erol Akchurin; Ron Batter; Rick Dehlinger; Alex DeJesus; Rick Del Giudice; Rick Diaz; Terry Gallagher; Leigh Gullette; Mike Kutner; Rich Pazo; Rob Rajisch; Wes Robbins; Alfredo Rodriguez; Howie Shapiro; Joe Squilla; Bruce Wood; Harvey Fuchs

=== Coaches ===
1978 Miami Hurricanes baseball coaching staff
- Ron Fraser – Head coach – 16th year

== Schedule and results ==
Legend
Miami win
Miami loss

1978 Miami Hurricanes baseball game log
Regular season

February
Date	Opponent	Site/stadium	Score	Overall record
Feb 17	Florida Tech	Mark Light Field • Coral Gables, FL	W 5–0	1–0
Feb 25	at Florida	Perry Field • Gainesville, FL	L 4–5	1–1
Feb 26	at Florida	Perry Field • Gainesville, FL	L 3–4	1–2
Feb 27	Florida A&M	Mark Light Field • Coral Gables, FL	W 5–2	2–2
Feb 28	Florida A&M	Mark Light Field • Coral Gables, FL	W 13–2	3–2

March
Date	Opponent	Site/stadium	Score	Overall record
Mar 1	at Biscayne	Miami, FL	W 9–5	4–2
Mar 3	Jacksonville	Mark Light Field • Coral Gables, FL	W 7–5	5–2
Mar 4	Jacksonville	Mark Light Field • Coral Gables, FL	W 3–1	6–2
Mar 6	St. Joseph's	Mark Light Field • Coral Gables, FL	W 11–0	7–2
Mar 7	St. Joseph's	Mark Light Field • Coral Gables, FL	W 6–4	8–2
Mar 9	at Florida Tech	Orlando, FL	W 27–3	9–2
Mar 10	at Florida Tech	Orlando, FL	W 10–1	10–2
Mar 11	at Florida Tech	Orlando, FL	W 7–4	11–2
Mar 13	at Biscayne	Miami, FL	W 14–2	12–2
Mar 15	NYIT	Mark Light Field • Coral Gables, FL	W 7–1	13–2
Mar 15	NYIT	Mark Light Field • Coral Gables, FL	W 6–5	14–2
Mar 16	NYIT	Mark Light Field • Coral Gables, FL	W 6–5	15–2
Mar 17	Southern Illinois	Mark Light Field • Coral Gables, FL	L 0–12	15–3
Mar 18	Miami (OH)	Mark Light Field • Coral Gables, FL	L 4–7	15–4
Mar 19	Bowling Green	Mark Light Field • Coral Gables, FL	W 5–1	16–4
Mar 20	West Chester	Mark Light Field • Coral Gables, FL	W 8–1	17–4
Mar 21	Southern Illinois	Mark Light Field • Coral Gables, FL	W 3–1	18–4
Mar 22	UMass	Mark Light Field • Coral Gables, FL	W 3–0	19–4
Mar 23	West Chester	Mark Light Field • Coral Gables, FL	W 5–2	20–4
Mar 24	Southern Illinois	Mark Light Field • Coral Gables, FL	W 4–2	21–4
Mar 25	UMass	Mark Light Field • Coral Gables, FL	W 19–4	22–4
Mar 27	Howard	Mark Light Field • Coral Gables, FL	W 3–1	23–4
Mar 27	Buffalo	Mark Light Field • Coral Gables, FL	W 3–1	24–4
Mar 28	Glassboro State	Mark Light Field • Coral Gables, FL	W 6–1	25–4
Mar 29	Buffalo	Mark Light Field • Coral Gables, FL	W 3–2^{10}	26–4
Mar 30	Buffalo	Mark Light Field • Coral Gables, FL	W 8–1	27–4
Mar 31	Buffalo	Mark Light Field • Coral Gables, FL	W 4–2	28–4

April
Date	Opponent	Site/stadium	Score	Overall record
Apr 1	Buffalo	Mark Light Field • Coral Gables, FL	L 4–6	28–5
Apr 2	Buffalo	Mark Light Field • Coral Gables, FL	W 3–1	29–5
Apr 5	Montreal Expos	Mark Light Field • Coral Gables, FL	L	
Apr 8	Tampa	Mark Light Field • Coral Gables, FL	W 5–4	30–5
Apr 8	Tampa	Mark Light Field • Coral Gables, FL	W 9–2	31–5
Apr 9	South Florida	Mark Light Field • Coral Gables, FL	L 1–2	31–6
Apr 11	at Biscayne	Miami, FL	L 4–6	31–7
Apr 14	vs Mercer	Atlanta, GA	W 8–1	32–7
Apr 14	vs Mercer	Atlanta, GA	W 8–4	33–7
Apr 15	vs Troy State	Atlanta, GA	W 12–4	34–7
Apr 16	at Georgia Tech	Atlanta, GA	W 18–3	35–7
Apr 18	at FIU	Miami, FL	W 10–6	36–7
Apr 21	at South Florida	Red McEwen Field • Tampa, FL	L 2–3	36–8
Apr 22	at South Florida	Red McEwen Field • Tampa, FL	W 3–1	37–8
Apr 26	Biscayne	Mark Light Field • Coral Gables, FL	W 4–1	38–8
Apr 28	Stetson	Mark Light Field • Coral Gables, FL	W 10–2	39–8
Apr 29	Stetson	Mark Light Field • Coral Gables, FL	W 5–4^{10}	40–8

May
Date	Opponent	Site/stadium	Score	Overall record
May 3	FIU	Mark Light Field • Coral Gables, FL	W 3–2^{10}	41–8
May 9	at Georgia Southern	Statesboro, GA	W 6–1	42–8
May 10	at Georgia Southern	Statesboro, GA	W 7–5	43–8
May 11	at Jacksonville	Jacksonville, FL	L 3–6	43–9
May 12	at Jacksonville	Jacksonville, FL	W 7–6	44–9

Postseason

NCAA Atlantic Regional
Date	Opponent	Site/stadium	Score	Overall record	NCAAT record
May 19	Clemson	Mark Light Field • Coral Gables, FL	L 5–8	44–10	0–1
May 20	Florida State	Mark Light Field • Coral Gables, FL	W 7–2	45–10	1–1
May 21	Clemson	Mark Light Field • Coral Gables, FL	W 7–5	46–10	2–1
May 21	Marshall	Mark Light Field • Coral Gables, FL	W 6–0	47–10	3–1
May 22	Marshall	Mark Light Field • Coral Gables, FL	W 5–1	48–10	4–1

College World Series
Date	Opponent	Site/stadium	Score	Overall record	CWS record
June 2	Southern California	Johnny Rosenblatt Stadium • Omaha, NE	L 3–9	48–11	0–1
June 3	Baylor	Johnny Rosenblatt Stadium • Omaha, NE	W 12–1	49–11	1–1
June 5	Oral Roberts	Johnny Rosenblatt Stadium • Omaha, NE	W 5–3	50–11	2–1
June 7	Arizona State	Johnny Rosenblatt Stadium • Omaha, NE	L 3–11	50–12	2–2
