= Ron Johnson (baseball) =

American baseball player (1956–2021)

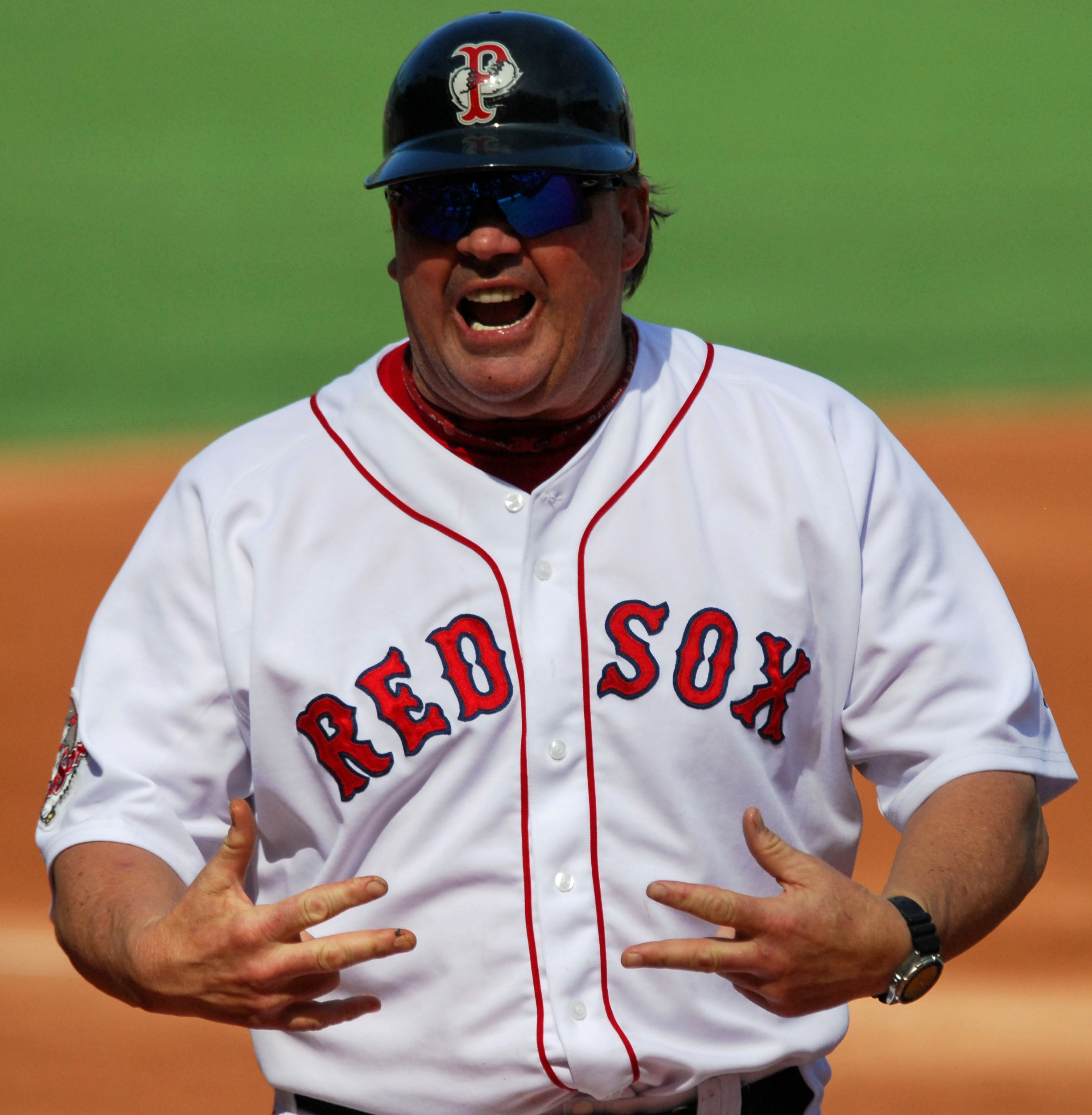
- Johnson managing the Pawtucket Red Sox in 2009
- First baseman
- Born: March 23, 1956; Long Beach, California, U.S.
- Died: January 26, 2021 (aged 64); Murfreesboro, Tennessee, U.S.
- Batted: Right Threw: Right

MLB debut
- September 12, 1982, for the Kansas City Royals

Last MLB appearance
- June 22, 1984, for the Montreal Expos

MLB statistics
- Batting average: .261
- Games played: 22
- Stats at Baseball Reference

Teams
- As player: Kansas City Royals (1982–1983); Montreal Expos (1984); As coach: Boston Red Sox (2010–2011)

Ronald David Johnson (March 23, 1956 – January 26, 2021) was an American baseball player, coach and minor league manager. From 2012 through 2018, he managed the Norfolk Tides of the International League, Triple-A farm system affiliate of the Baltimore Orioles. His 2018 season with Norfolk was his 14th season as a Triple-A manager; Johnson formerly helmed the Pawtucket Red Sox of the International League (2005–09), and the Omaha Royals (1998) and Omaha Golden Spikes (1999) of the Triple-A Pacific Coast League.

Johnson was a first baseman for the Kansas City Royals and Montreal Expos during his brief Major League Baseball (MLB) playing career from 1982 to 1984. He threw and batted right-handed, and was listed at 6 feet 3 inches (1.91 m) tall and 215 pounds (98 kg). Johnson was also a former first base coach of the Boston Red Sox of MLB in 2010 and 2011.

== Playing career ==
Johnson was a native of Long Beach, California. When in high school, he turned down football scholarships to UCLA and Fresno State University, and instead chose to play baseball at Fresno State. Johnson was originally drafted by the California Angels in the 13th round of the 1976 Major League Baseball draft, but did not sign. He was named to the 1978 College Baseball All-America Team by the American Baseball Coaches Association. He graduated from Fresno State before being drafted by the Kansas City Royals in the 24th round, with the 595th overall pick, in the 1978 MLB draft. He made his major league debut with the Royals on September 12, 1982. On December 15, 1983, the Royals traded Johnson to the Montreal Expos for Tom Dixon.

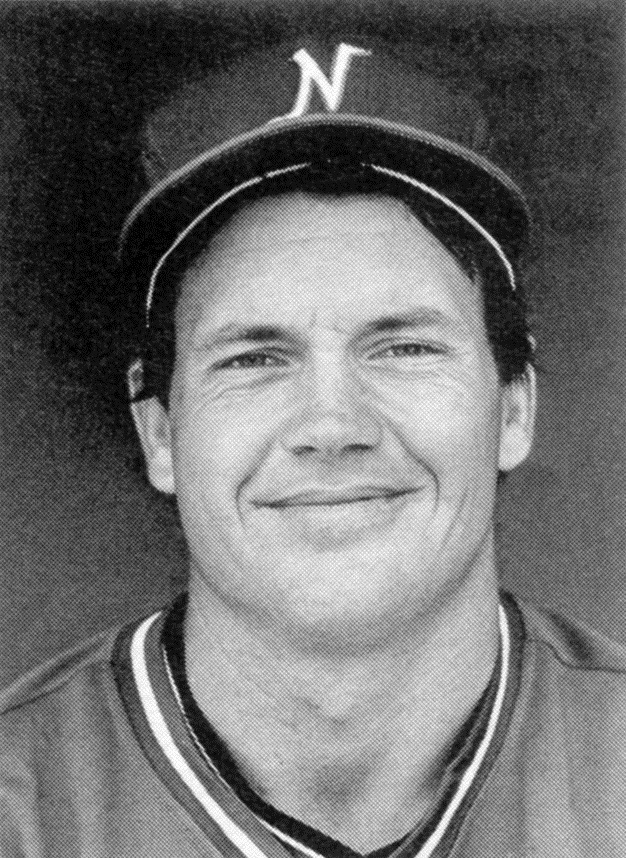
Johnson with the Nashville Sounds in 1985

Johnson played in 22 major league games over parts of three seasons, batting .261 with 12 hits, including two doubles and two runs batted in. He played 830 games in the minor leagues, most of them at the Triple-A level.

== Coaching and managerial career ==
=== Kansas City Royals ===
Shortly after his playing days ended in 1985, Johnson became a coach in the Royals' minor league system. He served as a coach within the Kansas City organization for six seasons, before becoming a manager.

Johnson made his managerial debut with the Baseball City Royals (Class A) of the Florida State League in 1992. He managed the Memphis Chicks for one season in 1994 leading them to a 75 win season. He won Texas League Manager of the Year honors in 1995, after guiding the Wichita Wranglers (Double-A) to the playoffs. Three years later, he reached Triple-A as manager of the Omaha Royals, and in 1999 he led that club to a first-place finish in the Pacific Coast League. In total, Johnson posted six winning seasons in his eight years managing in the Royals' organization.

=== Boston Red Sox ===
Johnson joined the Boston Red Sox organization in 2000 as manager of the Sarasota Red Sox (Class A) of the Florida State League. In 2002, Johnson was promoted to Double-A as manager of the Trenton Thunder of the Eastern League. When the Red Sox switched Double-A affiliations to the Portland Sea Dogs in 2003, he moved with them and was manager of the Sea Dogs for the next two seasons. His 2003 club went 72–70 and missed the Eastern League playoffs by just a game and a half. In 2004, Johnson once again had Portland near .500 for much of the year before finishing at 69–73 and in a tie for 4th-place in the Eastern League Northern Division. From 2005 to 2009, Johnson served as manager for Boston's Triple-A affiliate, the Pawtucket Red Sox.

On November 23, 2009, Johnson was appointed as first base coach for the major league Red Sox. He held the post for two seasons, but on October 5, 2011, Johnson was fired from the Red Sox staff following the departure of manager Terry Francona.

=== Baltimore Orioles ===
Johnson was next appointed manager of the Norfolk Tides, Triple-A affiliate of the Baltimore Orioles, and led them to back-to-back winning seasons in 2012 and 2013. In 2015, he managed the Tides to a division title and was named the International League Manager of the Year. The 2018 campaign marked his seventh consecutive year as Norfolk's manager, and he holds the franchise record for games won as a manager (491). During the year, Johnson was named the winner of the Orioles' Cal Ripken Sr. Player Development Award, but at the close of the season, he was released by the Baltimore organization as it underwent a significant front-office transition amid the departures of general manager Dan Duquette and manager Buck Showalter.

Johnson's minor league managerial record was 1,752–1,770 (.497) over 25 seasons.

== Personal life ==
Johnson and his wife, Daphne, had five children.

His son Chris was drafted in the 37th round by the Red Sox in June 2003 but instead opted for college; and was later drafted by the Houston Astros. Primarily a third baseman, Chris Johnson spent a dozen years in professional baseball, including all or parts of eight seasons (2009–16) in the majors with five teams. He had a breakout season in 2013 with the Atlanta Braves, finishing second in the National League batting race at .321. He also led the Braves in doubles (34) and finished second on the club in hits (165). Chris spent part of the 2017 season reunited with his father as a member of the Triple-A Tides in the Baltimore organization.

Johnson took an emergency leave from his coaching duties with the Red Sox on August 1, 2010, after his youngest daughter was seriously injured when hit by a car while horse riding. He missed the rest of the season but was able to return to the Red Sox at the outset of spring training in 2011.

Johnson died as a result of COVID-19 on January 26, 2021, at the age of 64.

== See also ==
- List of second-generation Major League Baseball players

Sporting positions
Preceded by Tom Poquette	Memphis Chicks manager 1994	Succeeded by Jerry Royster
Preceded by Keith Champion	Wichita Wranglers manager 1995–1997	Succeeded by John Mizerock
Preceded by Mike Jirschele	Omaha Royals/ Golden Spikes manager 1998–1999	Succeeded by John Mizerock
Preceded by Billy Gardner Jr.	Trenton Thunder manager 2002	Succeeded by Stump Merrill
Preceded by Eric Fox	Portland Sea Dogs manager 2003–2004	Succeeded by Todd Claus
Preceded by Buddy Bailey	Pawtucket Red Sox manager 2005–2009	Succeeded by Torey Lovullo
Preceded by Tim Bogar	Boston Red Sox first-base coach 2010–2011	Succeeded by Alex Ochoa
Preceded by Gary Allenson	Norfolk Tides manager 2012–2018	Succeeded by Gary Kendall
