= Dave Van Gorder =

American baseball player (1957–2025)

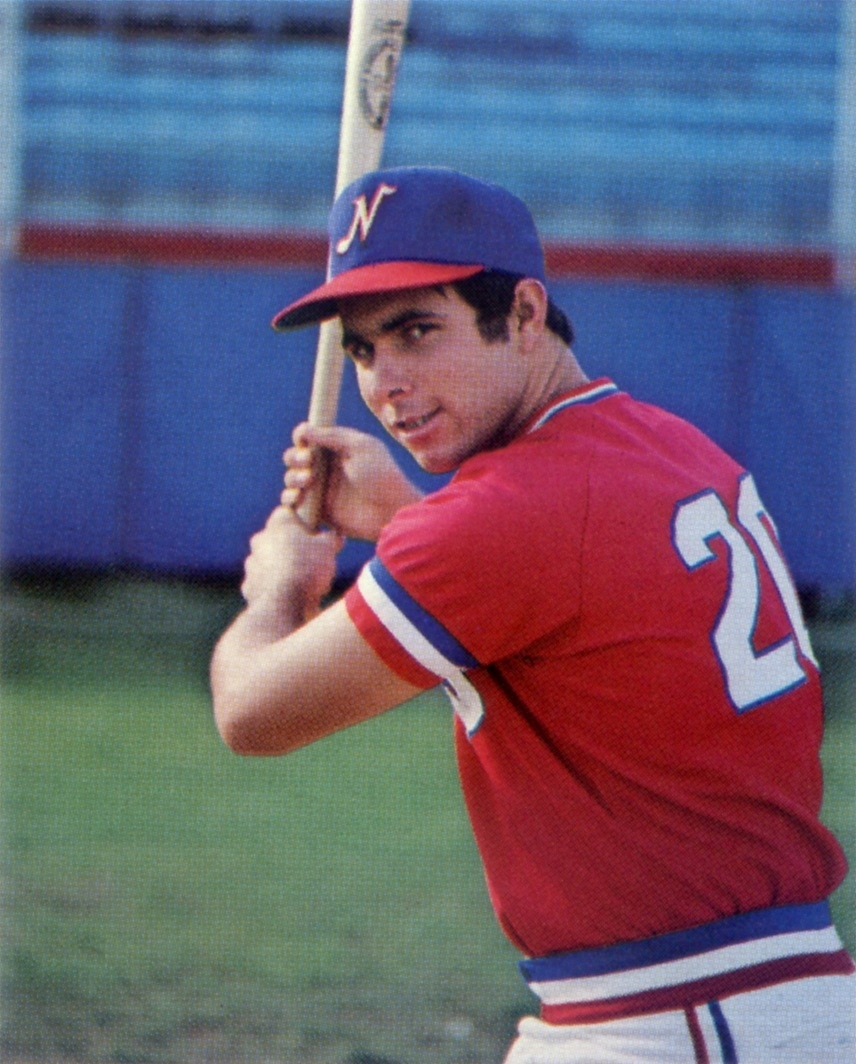
- Van Gorder with the Nashville Sounds in 1979
- Catcher
- Born: March 27, 1957; Los Angeles, California, U.S.
- Died: February 4, 2025 (aged 67); Tucson, Arizona, U.S.
- Batted: Right Threw: Right

MLB debut
- June 15, 1982, for the Cincinnati Reds

Last MLB appearance
- July 11, 1987, for the Baltimore Orioles

MLB statistics
- Batting average: .212
- Home runs: 3
- Runs batted in: 38
- Stats at Baseball Reference

Teams
- Cincinnati Reds (1982, 1984–1986); Baltimore Orioles (1987)

David Thomas Van Gorder (March 27, 1957 – February 4, 2025) was an American Major League Baseball catcher. He played parts of five seasons in the majors for the Cincinnati Reds and Baltimore Orioles from 1982 to 1987.

Van Gorder was originally drafted by the Philadelphia Phillies in the ninth round of the 1974 MLB draft, but he opted to play college ball at USC, where he led the team in hitting with a .339 average in 1977 and helped the Trojans win the 1978 NCAA Division I Baseball Tournament, earning All-American honors. He was subsequently drafted by the Reds in the second round of the 1978 amateur draft.

Van Gorder made his MLB debut for the Reds on June 15, 1982, catching for future Hall-of-Famer Tom Seaver. He spent the 1983 season back in the minors and then parts of the next three seasons with the Reds. The Reds released Van Gorder after the 1986 season and he signed with the Baltimore Orioles, but played sporadically and after being demoted to the minors in July he chose to retire.

Van Gorder died in Tucson, Arizona, on February 4, 2025, at the age of 67.

== Sources ==
- Career statistics from MLB · Baseball Reference · Baseball Reference (Minors) · Retrosheet · Baseball Almanac
