= 1978 North Carolina Tar Heels baseball team =

American college baseball season

1978 North Carolina Tar Heels baseball

South Regional champions

College World Series, T-7th
- Conference: Atlantic Coast
- CB: No. 3
- Record: 38–17 (9–3 ACC)
- Head coach: Mike Roberts (1st season)
- MVP: Matt Wilson
- Home stadium: Boshamer Stadium

1978 Atlantic Coast Conference baseball standings
	Conf.				Overall
Team	W		L	PCT	W		L	PCT
No. 25 Clemson ‍†‍‡‍^{y}	10	–	2	.833	39	–	14	.736
No. 3 North Carolina ‍‍‍^{y}	9	–	3	.750	38	–	17	.691
Wake Forest ‍‍‍	7	–	5	.583	23	–	14	.622
Maryland ‍‍‍	5	–	6	.455	14	–	14	.500
NC State ‍‍‍	5	–	7	.417	23	–	16	.590
Virginia ‍‍‍	4	–	8	.333	18	–	14	.563
Duke ‍‍‍	1	–	10	.091	12	–	22	.353
† – Conference champion ‡ – Tournament champion y – Invited to the NCAA tournament As of June 30, 1978; Rankings from Collegiate Baseball

The 1978 North Carolina Tar Heels baseball team represented University of North Carolina at Chapel Hill in the 1978 NCAA Division I baseball season. The Tar Heels played their home games at Boshamer Stadium. The team was coached by Mike Roberts in his 1st year as head coach at North Carolina.

The Tar Heels won the South Regional playoff to advance to the College World Series, where they were defeated by the Southern California Trojans.

== Roster ==
1978 North Carolina Tar Heels baseball team
Players
Coaches

#	Pos.	Name	B/T	Height	Weight	Year	Home town
	INF	Jim Atkinson	L/R	6 ft 2 in (1.88 m)	180 lb (82 kg)	Jr
		Dave Barnett	/	—	—
		Charlie Beverly	/	—	—
		Lloyd Brewer	/	—	—	Fr
		Mike Brewer	/	—	—	Fr
		Kevin Caddell	/	—	—	So
	INF	Roy Clark	R/R	5 ft 10 in (1.78 m)	165 lb (75 kg)	Sr
	RHP	Monte DeRatt	/R	6 ft 1 in (1.85 m)	195 lb (88 kg)	Jr
	INF	Mike Fox	/	—	—	Sr
		Phil Griffith	/	—	—	Jr
		J. D. Henderson	/	—	—	Fr
		Clay Johnson	/	—	—	Sr
	RHP	David Kirk	/R	—	—	Fr
		Brad Lloyd	/	—	—	So
		Mark McKinney	/	—	—
		Bill Musser	/	—	—	Fr
	RHP	Greg Norris	/R	6 ft 4 in (1.93 m)	205 lb (93 kg)	Jr	Whiteville, North Carolina
		James Parks	/	—	—	Fr
		Greg Robinson	/	—	—
		Jim Rouse	/	—	—	So
	RHP	Blaine Smith	/R	6 ft 1 in (1.85 m)	180 lb (82 kg)	Jr
		Matt Wilson	/	—	—	Jr

Head coach

Mike Roberts

Assistant coach(es)

Legend

- (C) Team captain
- (S) Suspended
- (I) Ineligible
- Injured
- Current redshirt

== Schedule ==
1978 North Carolina Tar Heels baseball game log
Regular season
February (2–0)

#	Date	Opponent	Site/stadium	Score	Overall record	ACC record
1	February 24	at Francis Marion	Unknown • Florence, South Carolina	8–2	1–0	–
2	February 25	at Francis Marion	Unknown • Florence, South Carolina	4–3	2–0	–

March (21–8)

#	Date	Opponent	Site/stadium	Score	Overall record	ACC record
3	March 3	at Texas–Pan American	Unknown • Edinburg, Texas	3–2	3–0	–
4	March 3	at Texas–Pan American	Unknown • Edinburg, Texas	5–0	4–0	–
5	March 5	at Texas–Pan American	Unknown • Edinburg, Texas	0–3	4–1	–
6	March 5	at Texas–Pan American	Unknown • Edinburg, Texas	7–6	5–1	–
7	March 6	vs Northern Iowa	Unknown • Edinburg, Texas	5–6	5–2	–
8	March 7	at Texas–Pan American	Unknown • Edinburg, Texas	3–1	6–2	–
9	March 8	vs Louisiana Tech	Unknown • Edinburg, Texas	5–7	6–3	–
10	March 8	at Texas–Pan American	Unknown • Edinburg, Texas	7–3	7–3	–
11	March 9	vs Northern Iowa	Unknown • Edinburg, Texas	12–0	8–3	–
12	March 10	vs Northern Iowa	Unknown • Edinburg, Texas	6–3	9–3	–
13	March 11	vs Oklahoma State	Unknown • Edinburg, Texas	3–2	10–3	–
14	March 11	at Texas–Pan American	Unknown • Edinburg, Texas	3–4	10–4	–
15	March 13	Campbell	Boshamer Stadium • Chapel Hill, North Carolina	4–6	10–5	–
16	March 15	Appalachian State	Boshamer Stadium • Chapel Hill, North Carolina	5–3	11–5	–
17	March 15	Liberty Baptist	Boshamer Stadium • Chapel Hill, North Carolina	4–3	12–5	–
18	March 16	Milligan	Boshamer Stadium • Chapel Hill, North Carolina	7–0	13–5	–
19	March 17	William & Mary	Boshamer Stadium • Chapel Hill, North Carolina	7–2	14–5	–
20	March 18	Duke	Boshamer Stadium • Chapel Hill, North Carolina	2–0	15–5	1–0
21	March 19	at South Carolina	Sarge Frye Field • Columbia, South Carolina	4–3	16–5	1–0
22	March 20	Madison	Boshamer Stadium • Chapel Hill, North Carolina	5–1	17–5	1–0
23	March 21	at Richmond	Malcolm U. Pitt Field • Richmond, Virginia	3–5	17–6	1–0
24	March 22	Old Dominion	Boshamer Stadium • Chapel Hill, North Carolina	6–3	18–6	1–0
25	March 23	at Duke	Jack Coombs Field • Durham, North Carolina	19–3	19–6	2–0
26	March 24	Clemson	Boshamer Stadium • Chapel Hill, North Carolina	6–1	20–6	3–0
27	March 27	East Carolina	Boshamer Stadium • Chapel Hill, North Carolina	4–2	21–6	3–0
28	March 28	St. John's	Boshamer Stadium • Chapel Hill, North Carolina	5–13	21–7	3–0
29	March 29	Le Moyne	Boshamer Stadium • Chapel Hill, North Carolina	16–5	22–7	3–0
30	March 30	Le Moyne	Boshamer Stadium • Chapel Hill, North Carolina	7–9	22–8	3–0
31	March 30	Towson State	Boshamer Stadium • Chapel Hill, North Carolina	8–1	23–8	3–0

April (9–5)

#	Date	Opponent	Site/stadium	Score	Overall record	ACC record
32	April 1	at Maryland	Shipley Field • College Park, Maryland	5–3	24–8	4–0
33	April 2	at Virginia	UVA Baseball Field • Charlottesville, Virginia	12–11	25–8	5–0
34	April 4	at NC State	Riddick Stadium • Raleigh, North Carolina	4–11	25–9	5–1
35	April 5	at East Carolina	Harrington Field • Greenville, North Carolina	3–12	25–10	5–1
36	April	at Wake Forest	Ernie Shore Field • Winston-Salem, North Carolina	6–0	26–10	6–1
37	April 8	Virginia	Boshamer Stadium • Chapel Hill, North Carolina	4–8	26–11	6–2
38	April 9	Maryland	Boshamer Stadium • Chapel Hill, North Carolina	3–5	26–12	6–3
39	April 10	at Liberty Baptist	Unknown • Lynchburg, Virginia	8–2	27–12	6–3
40	April 11	Virginia Tech	Boshamer Stadium • Chapel Hill, North Carolina	6–5	28–12	6–3
41	April 12	Wake Forest	Boshamer Stadium • Chapel Hill, North Carolina	6–5	29–12	7–3
42	April 14	South Carolina	Boshamer Stadium • Chapel Hill, North Carolina	3–11	29–13	7–3
43	April 15	South Carolina	Boshamer Stadium • Chapel Hill, North Carolina	4–0	30–13	7–3
44	April 16	NC State	Boshamer Stadium • Chapel Hill, North Carolina	6–5	31–13	8–3
45	April 17	Clemson	Boshamer Stadium • Chapel Hill, North Carolina	10–9	32–13	9–3

Postseason
ACC Tournament (0–1)

#	Date	Opponent	Site/stadium	Score	Overall record	ACC record
46	April 20	Duke	Beautiful Tiger Field • Clemson, South Carolina	2–3	32–14	9–3

April (1–0)

#	Date	Opponent	Site/stadium	Score	Overall record	ACC record
47	April 28	at East Tennessee State	Howard Johnson Field • Johnson City, Tennessee	5–1	33–14	9–3

NCAA South Regional (3–1)

#	Date	Opponent	Site/stadium	Score	Overall record	ACC record
48	May 20	vs East Tennessee State	Plainsman Park • Auburn, Alabama	15–1	34–14	9–3
49	May 21	at Auburn	Plainsman Park • Auburn, Alabama	3–2	35–14	9–3
50	May 22	vs Memphis State	Plainsman Park • Auburn, Alabama	6–8	35–15	9–3
51	May 23	vs Memphis State	Plainsman Park • Auburn, Alabama	11–9	36–15	9–3

College World Series (2–2)

#	Date	Opponent	Site/stadium	Score	Overall record	ACC record
52	June 3	vs Oral Roberts	Johnny Rosenblatt Stadium • Omaha, Nebraska	0–11	36–16	9–3
53	June 4	vs St. Johns	Johnny Rosenblatt Stadium • Omaha, Nebraska	9–5	37–16	9–3
54	June 5	vs Michigan	Johnny Rosenblatt Stadium • Omaha, Nebraska	7–6	38–16	9–3
55	June 6	vs Southern California	Johnny Rosenblatt Stadium • Omaha, Nebraska	2–3	38–17	9–3

== Awards and honors ==
Jim Atkinson

- First Team All-ACC

Greg Norris

- First Team All-ACC
- ACC Player of the Year
