= 1978 Arizona State Sun Devils baseball team =

American college baseball season

1978 Arizona State Sun Devils baseball

WAC Champions Rocky Mountain Regional champions

College World Series, 2nd
- Conference: Western Athletic Conference
- CB: No. 2
- Record: 56–12 (15–3 WAC)
- Head coach: Jim Brock (7th year)
- Home stadium: Packard Stadium

1978 Western Athletic Conference baseball standings
	Conf.				Overall
Team	W		L	PCT	W		L	PCT
Northern
BYU ^{x}‍‍‍	16	–	2	.889	37	–	15	.712
Wyoming ‍‍‍	8	–	10	.444	35	–	24	.593
Colorado State ‍‍‍	6	–	12	.333	20	–	26	.435
Utah ‍‍‍	6	–	12	.333	8	–	27	.229
Southern
No. 2 Arizona State ^{x}‍‍‡‍^{y}	15	–	3	.833	56	–	12	.824
Arizona ‍‍‍^{y}	13	–	5	.722	42	–	13	.764
New Mexico ‍‍‍	5	–	12	.294	31	–	24	.564
UTEP ‍‍‍	2	–	15	.118	26	–	26	.500
x – Division champion ‡ – Championship Series champion y – Invited to the NCAA tournament As of June 30, 1978; Rankings from Collegiate Baseball

The 1978 Arizona State Sun Devils baseball team represented Arizona State University in the 1978 NCAA Division I baseball season. The Sun Devils played their home games at Packard Stadium. The team was coached by Jim Brock in his seventh season at Arizona State.

The Sun Devils reached the College World Series, finishing as the runner up to Southern California.

== Roster ==
1978 Arizona State Sun Devils roster
– Dayton Barton; – Earthell Buckner; – Dale Eiler; – Larry Eiler; – David Glick; – Dave Hudgens; – Dave Kush; – Eddie Malone; – Scott Merrill; – Glenn Moon; – Mike Parkinson; – Steve Schefsky; – Randy Whistler	Pitchers: – Jeff Ahern; – Kevin Dukes; – Ken Jones; – Casey Lindsey; – Mitch Dean; – Denny Miller; – Tom van der Meersche; – Jerry Vasquez	Infielders: – Jamie Allen; – Mike Anicich; 7 – Hubie Brooks; 5 – Bob Horner; Catchers: – Chris Bando	Outfielders: – Ed Irvine; – Steve Michael; – Greg Stahl

== Schedule ==
Legend
Arizona State win
Arizona State loss

1978 Arizona State Sun Devils baseball game log
Regular season

February
Date	Opponent	Site/stadium	Score	Overall record	WAC record
Feb 11	Cal State Northridge*	Packard Stadium • Tempe, AZ	W 22–8	1–0	
Feb 12	Cal State Northridge*	Packard Stadium • Tempe, AZ	W 9–1	2–0	
Feb 12	Cal State Northridge*	Packard Stadium • Tempe, AZ	W 7–2	3–0	
Feb 14	Chico State*	Packard Stadium • Tempe, AZ	W 8–3	4–0	
Feb 16	Baylor*	Packard Stadium • Tempe, AZ	W 3–1	5–0	
Feb 16	Baylor*	Packard Stadium • Tempe, AZ	W 5–1	6–0	
Feb 17	Fresno State*	Packard Stadium • Tempe, AZ	L 5–7	6–1	
Feb 18	Fresno State*	Packard Stadium • Tempe, AZ	W 15–0	7–1	
Feb 18	Fresno State*	Packard Stadium • Tempe, AZ	W 6–4	8–1	
Feb 20	UC Riverside*	Packard Stadium • Tempe, AZ	W 11–7	9–1	
Feb 20	UC Riverside*	Packard Stadium • Tempe, AZ	W 9–7	10–1	
Feb 21	UC Riverside*	Packard Stadium • Tempe, AZ	W 13–5	11–1	
Feb 22	Azusa Pacific*	Packard Stadium • Tempe, AZ	W 8–2	12–1	
Feb 24	Cal Poly Pomona*	Packard Stadium • Tempe, AZ	W 7–4	13–1	
Feb 25	Cal Poly Pomona*	Packard Stadium • Tempe, AZ	W 12–4	14–1	
Feb 25	Cal Poly Pomona*	Packard Stadium • Tempe, AZ	W 12–4	15–1	

March
Date	Opponent	Site/stadium	Score	Overall record	WAC record
Mar 2	Southern California*	Packard Stadium • Tempe, AZ	W 13–9	16–1	
Mar 3	Southern California*	Packard Stadium • Tempe, AZ	W 13–7	17–1	
Mar 6	Chapman*	Packard Stadium • Tempe, AZ	L 4–5	17–2	
Mar 7	Chapman*	Packard Stadium • Tempe, AZ	W 17–1	18–2	
Mar 8	Chapman*	Packard Stadium • Tempe, AZ	W 9–4	19–2	
Mar 11	at UNLV*	Rebel Field • Paradise, NV	L 3–5	19–3	
Mar 11	at UNLV*	Rebel Field • Paradise, NV	W 4–3	20–3	
Mar 12	at UNLV*	Rebel Field • Paradise, NV	W 18–10	21–3	
Mar 13	La Verne*	Packard Stadium • Tempe, AZ	W 5–1	22–3	
Mar 14	LaVerne*	Packard Stadium • Tempe, AZ	W 5–3	23–3	
Mar 15	Arizona*	(Best in the West Tournament)	W 8–1	24–3	
Mar 16	Grand Canyon*	(Best in the West Tournament)	W 18–14	25–3	
Mar 16	Eastern Michigan*	(Best in the West Tournament)	W 6–3	26–3	
Mar 18	Northern Arizona*	(Best in the West Tournament)	W 14–1	27–3	
Mar 19	Arizona*	(Best in the West Tournament)	W 7–4	28–3	
Mar 31	at Southern California*	Dedeaux Field • Los Angeles, CA	L 0–11	28–4	

April
Date	Opponent	Site/stadium	Score	Overall record	WAC record
Apr 1	at Southern California*	Dedeaux Field • Los Angeles, CA	L 6–11	28–5	
Apr 2	at Southern California*	Dedeaux Field • Los Angeles, CA	L 1–10	28–6	
Apr 7	at UTEP	Dudley Field • El Paso, TX	W 6–4	29–6	1–0
Apr 8	at UTEP	Dudley Field • El Paso, TX	W 15–3	30–6	2–0
Apr 8	at UTEP	Dudley Field • El Paso, TX	W 12–6	31–6	3–0
Apr 11	at Grand Canyon*	Brazell Stadium • Phoenix, AZ	W 10–9	32–6	
Apr 14	New Mexico	Packard Stadium • Tempe, AZ	W 10–2	33–6	4–0
Apr 15	New Mexico	Packard Stadium • Tempe, AZ	W 22–3	34–6	5–0
Apr 15	New Mexico	Packard Stadium • Tempe, AZ	W 15–9	35–6	6–0
Apr 20	Arizona	Packard Stadium • Tempe, AZ	W 15–9	36–6	7–0
Apr 21	Arizona	Packard Stadium • Tempe, AZ	W 10–8	37–6	8–0
Apr 22	Arizona	Packard Stadium • Tempe, AZ	W 11–10^{10}	38–6	9–0
Apr 25	Grand Canyon*	Packard Stadium • Tempe, AZ	W 9–3	39–6	
Apr 28	at New Mexico	Lobo Field • Albuquerque, NM	L 5–9	39–7	9–1
Apr 29	at New Mexico	Lobo Field • Albuquerque, NM	W 14–8^{10}	40–7	10–1
Apr 29	at New Mexico	Lobo Field • Albuquerque, NM	W 14–4	41–7	11–1

May
Date	Opponent	Site/stadium	Score	Overall record	WAC record
May 1	UNLV*	Packard Stadium • Tempe, AZ	W 8–2	42–7	
May 2	UNLV*	Packard Stadium • Tempe, AZ	W 7–6	43–7	
May 5	UTEP	Packard Stadium • Tempe, AZ	W 11–1	44–7	12–1
May 6	UTEP	Packard Stadium • Tempe, AZ	W 20–3	45–7	13–1
May 6	UTEP	Packard Stadium • Tempe, AZ	W 15–0	46–7	14–1
May 11	at Arizona	Wildcat Field • Tucson, AZ	L 3–5	46–8	14–2
May 12	at Arizona	Wildcat Field • Tucson, AZ	L 7–10	46–9	14–3
May 13	at Arizona	Wildcat Field • Tucson, AZ	W 11–6	47–9	15–3

Postseason

WAC playoffs
Date	Opponent	Site/stadium	Score	Overall record	WAC CS Record
May 18	BYU	Packard Stadium • Tempe, AZ	W 3–1	48–9	1–0
May 19	BYU	Packard Stadium • Tempe, AZ	W 6–4	49–9	2–0

NCAA Rocky Mountain Regional
Date	Opponent	Site/stadium	Score	Overall record	NCAAT record
May 26	UNLV	Packard Stadium • Tempe, AZ	L 10–17	49–10	0–1
May 26	Washington State	Packard Stadium • Tempe, AZ	W 14–8	50–10	1–1
May 27	UNLV	Packard Stadium • Tempe, AZ	W 30–5	51–10	2–1
May 28	Gonzaga	Packard Stadium • Tempe, AZ	W 17–1	52–10	3–1
May 28	Gonzaga	Packard Stadium • Tempe, AZ	W 11–4	53–10	4–1

College World Series
Date	Opponent	Site/stadium	Score	Overall record	CWS record
June 3	St. John's	Johnny Rosenblatt Stadium • Omaha, NE	W 13–2	54–10	1–0
June 4	Oral Roberts	Johnny Rosenblatt Stadium • Omaha, NE	W 7–6	55–10	2–0
June 6	Southern California	Johnny Rosenblatt Stadium • Omaha, NE	L 2–5	55–11	2–1
June 7	Miami (FL)	Johnny Rosenblatt Stadium • Omaha, NE	W 13–3	56–11	3–1
June 8	Southern California	Johnny Rosenblatt Stadium • Omaha, NE	L 3–10	56–12	3–2
