= 1978 NCAA Division I baseball rankings =

1978 NCAA Division I baseball season
- Number of teams: 239

NCAA tournament

College World Series
- Champions: USC (11th title)
- Runners-up: Arizona State (10th CWS Appearance)
- Winning Coach: Rod Dedeaux (11th title)
- MOP: Rod Boxberger (USC)

Seasons
- ← 1977 1979 →

The following poll makes up the 1978 NCAA Division I baseball rankings. Collegiate Baseball Newspaper published its first human poll of the top 20 teams in college baseball in 1957, and expanded to rank the top 30 teams in 1961.

== Collegiate Baseball ==
Currently, only the final poll from the 1978 season is available.

Rank	Team
1	USC
2	Arizona State
3	North Carolina
4	Miami (FL)
5	Oral Roberts
6	Michigan
7	St. John's
8	Baylor
9	Memphis
10	Arizona
11	Gonzaga
12	Texas A&M
13	Houston
14	Mississippi State
15	UCLA
16	Washington State
17	Marshall
18	Arkansas
19	Temple
20	Southern Illinois
21	Cal State Fullerton
22	Auburn
23	BYU
24	UNLV
25	Clemson
26	Oklahoma State
27	Eastern Michigan
28	Hawaii
29	Texas–Pan American
30	Detroit
