= Bill Bordley =

American baseball player (born 1958)

- Pitcher
- Born: January 9, 1958 (age 68); Los Angeles, California, U.S.
- Batted: Right Threw: Left

MLB debut
- June 30, 1980, for the San Francisco Giants

Last MLB appearance
- September 9, 1980, for the San Francisco Giants

MLB statistics
- Win–loss record: 2-3
- Earned run average: 4.70
- Strikeouts: 11
- Stats at Baseball Reference

Teams
- San Francisco Giants (1980)

William Clarke Bordley (born January 9, 1958) is an American former Major League Baseball pitcher with the San Francisco Giants. Bordley was inducted into the College Baseball Hall of Fame in 2014. In 2011, he was named vice president for Major League Baseball Security investigations. Bordley was a presidential Secret Service agent, assigned to the White House, from 1995 to 2001. In 2002, he was promoted to attaché agent-in-charge to Russia at the American embassy in Moscow. Bordley is the president of WCB International.net, an international financial security company.

== High school and college career ==
Bordley attended Bishop Montgomery High School in Torrance, California. While there he set school records in innings pitched, strikeouts, wins and earned run average that still stand as of 2025. Bordley is a two time California Player of the Year and high school All American, who led the Knights to the 1975 Max Prep National Championship at Dodger Stadium. His baseball jersey was retired by the school and he was featured on 8 Million Wheatie Boxes. In 1975, Bordley was featured in Sports Illustrated “Faces in the Crowd” for pitching all 35 innings without allowing an earned run in the playoffs, while batting over 400. This was his first national media notification. Upon graduation, Bordley was selected by the Milwaukee Brewers in the first round (4th pick overall) of the 1976 Major League Baseball draft. Bordley was drafted ahead of future Major League Baseball All-Stars such as Jack Morris, Ken Landreaux, Leon Durham, Pat Tabler, Bruce Hurst, Mike Scioscia, Mike Scott, Alan Trammell and Rickey Henderson. Bordley elected to forego the Majors, however, to attend the University of Southern California. In his freshman year with the USC Trojans baseball team, Bordley went undefeated with a 14–0 win–loss record and led the Pacific-10 Conference in strikeouts and wins. His freshman strikeout record would stand until broken by Tim Lincecum in 2004. In 1977 Bordley was named the Pacific 8 Athlete of the Year ahead of USC’s football Charles White and UCLA’s basketball David Greenwood. His 26–2 win loss record remains best in USC history. Bordley led the Trojans to the 1978 College World Series and subsequently the NCAA Division I Baseball Championship in the same year. Bordley started and won the final game of the 1978 College World Series, shutting out Arizona State University into the 8th inning. Bordley received American Baseball Coaches Association and Sporting News First Team All-American honors in 1977 and 1978, becoming the only Trojan to be named first team All American twice. In 2014, Bordley joined Rod Dedeaux, Mark McGwire, Fred Lynn, Rich Dauer, Steve Kemp and Roy Smalley as USC's first seven inductees to the College Baseball Hall of Fame.

== Professional career ==
After his collegiate career, MLB Commissioner Bowie Kuhn, found the California Angels guilty of tampering with Bordley, prior to the January 1979 MLB draft. A subsequent MLB investigation allowed Bordley's rights to the San Francisco Giants. He joins Tom Seaver as the only two MLB players ever having the Commissioner allow a player a special lottery. He signed a Major League Contract and a then record $250,000 signing bonus. In 1981, MLBPA President Marvin Miller, won an arbitration case supporting Bordley's contention that his Major League contract and bonus were salary, resulting in additional accrued pension benefits. After only one year in the minors, the Giants promoted Bordley to the Major Leagues and put him in their starting rotation, joining Vida Blue, as left handed starters. Bordley's debut with the Giants was on June 30, 1980. He appeared in the game as the Giants starting pitcher against the Cincinnati Reds. He registered a strike out against the first batter faced, Reds outfielder Dave Collins. Bordley would go on to give up 3 runs over 6 innings to earn the win over Reds pitcher and future Hall of Famer Tom Seaver. He also collected his first Major League hit off Seaver. Bordley would also tally a strike out against Johnny Bench, another future Hall of Famer. In Bordley's second start in Cincinnati, he surrendered a historic home run to Bench, tying Yogi Berra for all time home runs by a catcher. Bordley won his first two starts against the Reds and in his 3rd start in Pittsburgh, held the World Champion Pirates to 1 earned run in 7 innings. Bordley had multiple Tommy John surgeries later in 1980-1981 and was on the Major League disabled list for most of the 1981 and 1982 seasons, never to return to the Major Leagues. He was released following a comeback attempt in the Giants minor league system in 1982. In 1983, Atlanta Braves Manager, Joe Torre, invited Bordley to Major League Spring Training.

== Post-baseball career ==
After his MLB playing career, Bordley returned to USC where he earned his finance degree as a dean's list student in USC’s prestigious Marshall school of Business, while serving as the USC pitching coach. In 1988, he joined the United States Secret Service as a special agent. He served 5 1/2 years on President Bill Clinton's detail. Bordley was compelled, via subpoena, to testify through the Office of Independent Counsel headed by Ken Starr, in the matter concerning the president and White House intern, Monica Lewinsky. In 2002, he was promoted to Resident Attaché Agent in Charge for the Secret Service at the American embassy in Moscow. He was in charge of all presidential and vice presidential security operations in visits to Russia. He accompanied Russian president Vladimir Putin, on numerous visits to the United States, coordinating with Kremlin counterparts. Bordley provided oversight on top secret investigations, including the counterfeiting of United States currency, fraudulent international banking operations and protection assignments in over 50 countries. Bordley was assigned to Germany when 9/11 occurred and investigated numerous terrorist cells out of Hamburg. He is conversant in the German language and maintains top secret clearance. Shortly after the 2011 World Series MLB Commissioner Bud Selig named Bordley chief of security, officially Vice President of Security and Facility Management. He is a staunch proponent for the extension of security nets around all MLB stadiums and worked with MLB players and executives in efforts to implement this. Selig first met Bordley in 1976 when his Milwaukee Brewers drafted Bordley.

Bordley is a Roman Catholic and a member of the Catholic Athletes for Christ (CAC).
