= Bob Skube =

American baseball player (born 1957)

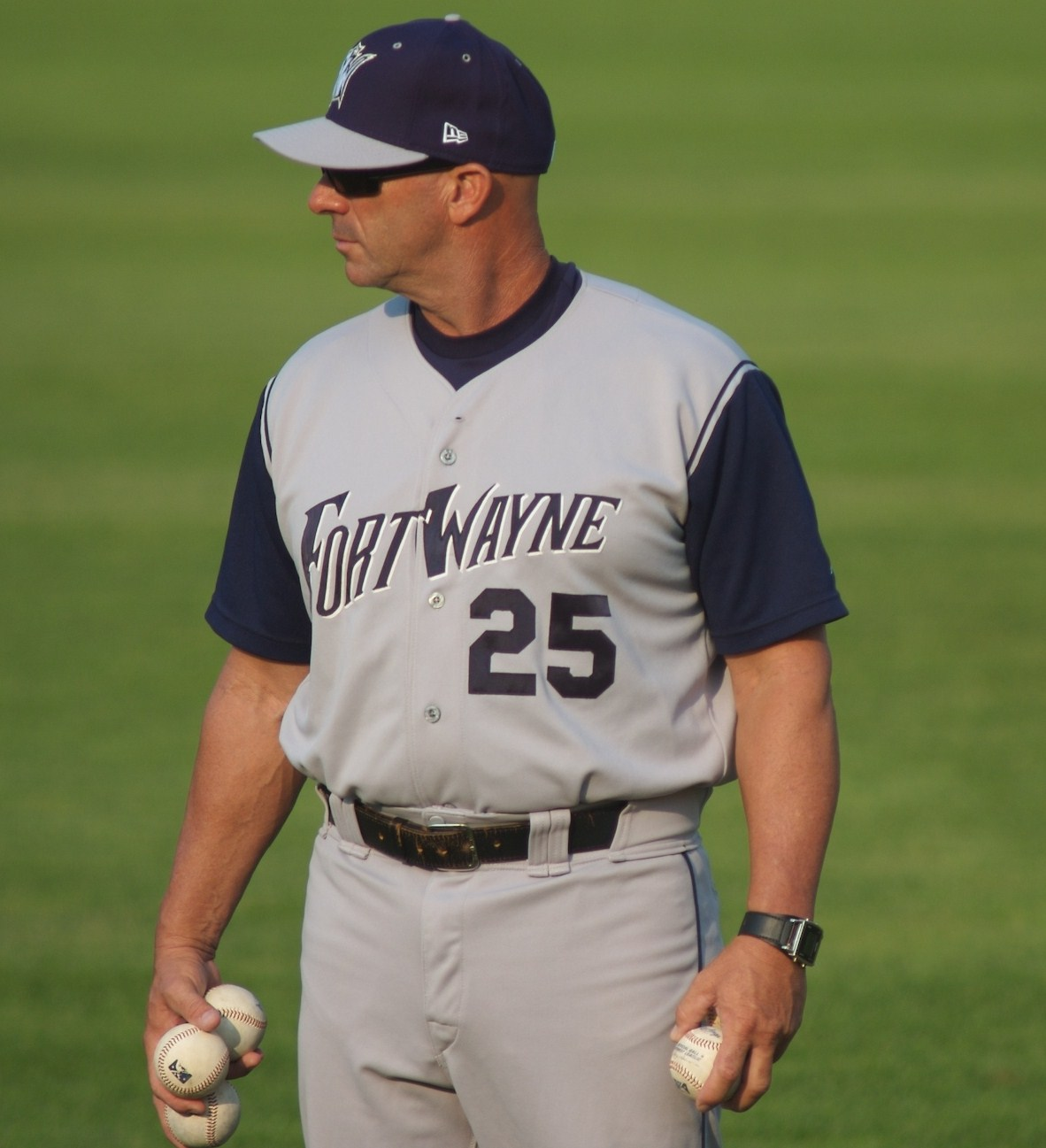
- Outfielder
- Born: October 8, 1957 (age 68); Northridge, California, U.S.
- Batted: Left Threw: Left

MLB debut
- September 17, 1982, for the Milwaukee Brewers

Last MLB appearance
- May 29, 1983, for the Milwaukee Brewers

MLB statistics
- Batting average: .250
- Hits: 7
- Runs batted in: 9
- Stats at Baseball Reference

Teams
- Milwaukee Brewers (1982–1983)

Robert Jacob Skube (born October 8, 1957) is an American former professional baseball player whose career spanned seven seasons, two of which were spent in Major League Baseball (MLB) with the Milwaukee Brewers (1982–83). Skube has also served as a manager and coach in minor league baseball. During his MLB career, he compiled a .250 batting average with seven hits, one double, one triple, and nine runs batted in (RBIs) in 16 games played. Defensively in the majors, Skube played five games in center field, four games in right field, three games as a designated hitter, and one game at first base.

Skube attended Simi Valley High School, and the University of Southern California before turning professional. During the 1979 Major League Baseball draft, the Milwaukee Brewers selected Skube in the 13^{th} round. He made his professional debut that season in the minor leagues with the Class-A Stockton Ports and the Class-A Burlington Bees. Over his minor league career, Skube batted .276 with 634 hits, 140 doubles, 24 triples, and 80 home runs.

In 2005, Skube began his coaching career with the Class-A Bakersfield Blaze of the California League. During the next season, he was made manager of the Arizona League Rangers of the rookie-level Arizona League. Since then, Skube has served as the hitting coach for the Class-A Fort Wayne Wizards of the Midwest League (2007), the rookie-level Arizona League Padres of the Arizona League (2008–09), and the Class-A Lake Elsinore Storm of the California League (2010). Skube currently serves as the Triple-A Tucson Padres hitting coach.

== Early life ==
Skube was born on October 8, 1957, in Northridge, California. He attended Simi Valley High School in Simi Valley, California. In 1975, while attending Simi Valley High, he was drafted in the fifth round of that year's Major League Baseball (MLB) draft by the Atlanta Braves, but did not sign. Skube then enrolled at the University of Southern California (USC). In 1978, as a member of the USC Trojans baseball team, he was drafted in the 18^{th} round of that year's MLB draft, but did not sign. Later that year, he was a member of the United States collegiate national baseball team, which played the Japanese collegiate national baseball team in Tokyo. In 1979, Skube was named the USC Trojans baseball "most improved player". That year, he was drafted in the 13^{th} round of the MLB draft by the Milwaukee Brewers.

== Playing career ==
Skube made his professional baseball career debut in 1979 with the Class-A Burlington Bees in the Milwaukee Brewers minor league organization. In 54 games that season with the Bees, he batted .294 with 26 runs scored, 57 hits, 14 doubles, one triple, nine home runs, 45 runs batted in (RBIs), and 16 stolen bases. Defensively with Burlington, Skube played 43 games in the outfield, and four games at first base, committing eight combined errors. Late in the season, Skube was assigned to the Class-A Stockton Ports of the California League. In one regular season game, he got one hit in five at-bats. He also played with the Ports during the playoffs.

In 1980, Skube spent the entire season with the Class-A Stockton Ports. He batted .291 with 132 hits, 26 doubles, seven triples, and 19 home runs in 135 games played. He was fourth in the league in doubles, tied for fifth in home runs, and was seventh in triples. In the field, he played outfield and first base. After the season, Skube won the Eddie Mulligan Award, which is bestowed to the top rookie in the California League. During the 1981 season, Skube was promoted to the Double-A level. He spent the entire year with the El Paso Diablos of the Texas League. In 114 games played, he batted .284 with 89 runs scored, 113 hits, 23 doubles, five triples, 18 home runs, and 59 RBIs. Skube played all of his 114 games with the Diablos in the outfield, committing nine errors, and 170 putouts. At the end of the season, the Milwaukee Brewers purchased Skube's contract, adding him to their 40-man roster.

In February 1982, Skube was re-signed by the Milwaukee Brewers. He attended spring training with the Milwaukee Brewers in 1982, and was said to be the leading candidate for the back-up outfielder position on the major league roster. However, Skube started the regular season in the minor leagues with the Triple-A Vancouver Canadians of the Pacific Coast League. In late-August, there were rumors that the Brewers had traded Skube to the Houston Astros in a deal for Don Sutton. However, the Brewers later sent Frank DiPino, and Mike Madden to the Astros to complete the deal. On the season, he batted .279 with 55 runs scored, 121 hits, 26 doubles, two triples, 13 home runs, 61 RBIs, and 13 stolen bases in 130 games played with the Canadians. On September 7, the Brewers called-up Skube to the major leagues. He made his MLB debut against the New York Yankees on September 17, pinch-hitting for designated hitter Roy Howell in the eighth inning. In one at-bat, he got a hit, the first of his major league career. In the major leagues that season, Skube got two hits in three at-bats. Defensively, he played one game in center field. He was also the designated hitter in one contest.

Skube started the 1983 season with the Milwaukee Brewers in the majors. He made his season debut on April 10, against the Kansas City Royals, getting no hits, one run scored, and one RBI in two at-bats. In June, Skube was optioned to the minor leagues. Skube's last game of the year in the majors came on May 28, against the Seattle Mariners. It would later prove to be the last game of his MLB career. On the season with the Brewers, he played in 12 games, batting .200 with two runs scored, five hits, one double, one triple, and nine RBIs. Defensively, Skube played four games in center field, four games in right field, and one game at first base. He was also the designated hitter for two games. After the demotion, Skube threatened to quit baseball. However, he eventually accepted the assignment. In the minors, he played with the Triple-A Vancouver Canadians of the Pacific Coast League. His season ended after just 40 games, as he needed surgery on both of his knees. In those games with Vancouver, Skube batted .209 with 15 runs scored, 27 hits, three triples, three home runs, and eight RBIs. In the field, he played 34 games in the outfield, and one game at first base; committing one combined error. In October 1983, the Brewers outrighted Skube to the minor leagues, dropping him from their 40-man roster.

During spring training in 1984, Skube was assigned to minor league camp. Skube commented that during the off-season, he had trained harder than ever before, and hoped to make the major league roster. However, he started the season at the Double-A level, with the El Paso Diablos. With El Paso, he batted .312 with 63 hits, 17 doubles, two triples, and six home runs in 56 games played. In late-June, Skube was promoted to the Triple-A Vancouver Canadians, where in 61 games he batted .267 with 56 hits, 13 doubles, four triples, and nine home runs. Between the two teams, Skube played first base and the outfield. The final season of Skube's pro-baseball playing career came in 1985. At the start of the season, he was assigned to Triple-A Vancouver. In 89 games played, he batted .232 with 64 hits, 18 doubles, three triples, and three home runs.

== Coaching career ==
In 2003, Skube was involved in a baseball camp for the Milwaukee Brewers, which included former players Ken Sanders, Moose Haas, Rob Deer, Del Crandall, Bill Schroeder, Dale Sveum, and Lou Klimchock. In 2005, Skube was hired as the hitting coach for the Class-A Bakersfield Blaze of the California League. That season, the Blaze, who were a Texas Rangers affiliate, went 68–72. Skube was hired as the manager of the rookie-level Arizona League Rangers in 2006. At the helm, Skube led the Rangers to a 19–37 record. In 2007, Skube was hired as the hitting coach for the Class-A Fort Wayne Wizards of the Midwest League. The Wizards, who affiliated with the MLB San Diego Padres, had a 55–84 record that season. Skube returned as a coach in the Padres organization in 2008, getting a position with the rookie-level Arizona League Padres. The Arizona League Padres had a 33–23 record that season. Skube returned as the hitting coach for the rookie-level Padres in 2009. The Padres had a 28–28 record that season. He was hired as the hitting coach for the Class-A Lake Elsinore Storm of the California League in 2010. Currently, Skube is the hitting coach for the Triple-A Tucson Padres of the Pacific Coast League.
