= 1978 NCAA Division I baseball tournament =

- Season: 1978
- Teams: 34
- Finals site: Johnny Rosenblatt Stadium; Omaha, Nebraska
- Champions: Southern California (11th title)
- Runner-up: Arizona State (2nd CWS Appearance)
- Winning coach: Rod Dedeaux (11th title)
- MOP: Rod Boxberger (Southern California)

The 1978 NCAA Division I baseball tournament was played at the end of the 1978 NCAA Division I baseball season to determine the national champion of college baseball. The tournament concluded with eight teams competing in the College World Series, a double-elimination tournament in its thirty-second year. Eight regional competitions were held to determine the participants in the final event. Seven regions held a four team, double-elimination tournament while one region included six teams, resulting in 34 teams participating in the tournament at the conclusion of their regular season, and in some cases, after a conference tournament. The thirty-second tournament's champion was Southern California, coached by Rod Dedeaux. The Most Outstanding Player was Rod Boxberger of Southern California.

== Regionals ==
The opening rounds of the tournament were played across eight regional sites across the country, seven consisting of four teams and one of six teams. The winners of each District advanced to the College World Series.

Bold indicates winner.

=== Atlantic Regional at Coral Gables, FL ===
Quarterfinals
**Marshall**	**4**
Florida State	0
**Clemson**	**8**
Miami (FL)	5
Lower round 1
Florida State	2
**Miami (FL)**	**7**

Semifinals
**Marshall**	**9**
Clemson	3
Lower final
Clemson	5
**Miami (FL)**	**7**

Final
Marshall	0	1
**Miami (FL)**	**6**	**5**

=== Mideast Regional at Ann Arbor, MI ===
Quarterfinals
**Eastern Michigan**	**4**
Missouri	2
**Michigan**	**8**
Texas A&M	1
Lower round 1
Missouri	1
**Texas A&M**	**5**

Semifinals
Eastern Michigan	4
**Michigan**	**6**
Lower final
Eastern Michigan	1
**Texas A&M**	**6**

Final
**Michigan**	**3**	—
Texas A&M	0	—

=== Midwest Regional at Tulsa, OK ===
Quarterfinals
**Southern Illinois**	**7**
Michigan State	2
**Oral Roberts**	**10**
Oklahoma State	3
Lower round 1
Michigan State	6
**Oklahoma State**	**7**

Semifinals
Southern Illinois	5
**Oral Roberts**	**8**
Lower final
**Southern Illinois**	**4**
Oklahoma State	0

Final
**Oral Roberts**	**7**	—
Southern Illinois	2	—

=== Northeast Regional at Holyoke, MA ===
Round 1
**Delaware**	**1**
Harvard	0
**Holy Cross**	**5**
St. John's	3
**Temple**	**5**
UMass	0

Round 2
**Delaware**	**4**
UMass	3
Holy Cross	7*
**Temple**	**8***
Harvard	0
**St. John's**	**8**

Quarterfinals
Delaware	4
**Temple**	**12**
Holy Cross	12
**St. John's**	**14**

Semifinals
Delaware	4
**St. John's**	**7**

Final
Temple	5	6
**St. John's**	**8**	**15**

=== Rocky Mountain Regional at Tempe, AZ ===
Quarterfinals
**Gonzaga**	**7**
Washington State	1
**UNLV**	**17**
Arizona State	10
Lower round 1
Washington State	8
**Arizona State**	**14**

Semifinals
**Gonzaga**	**5**
UNLV	4
Lower final
UNLV	5
**Arizona State**	**30**

Final
Gonzaga	1	4
**Arizona State**	**17**	**11**

=== South Regional at Auburn, AL ===
Quarterfinals
**North Carolina**	**15**
East Tennessee State	1
**Auburn**	**14**
Memphis	10
Lower round 1
East Tennessee State	0
**Memphis**	**5**

Semifinals
**North Carolina**	**3**
Auburn	2
Lower final
Auburn	5
**Memphis**	**6**

Final
**North Carolina**	6	**11**
Memphis	**8**	9

=== South Central Regional at Arlington, TX ===
Quarterfinals
**Texas–Pan American**	**7**
Louisiana Tech	0
**Baylor**	**3**
Mississippi State	0
Lower round 1
Louisiana Tech	5
**Mississippi State**	**6**

Semifinals
Texas–Pan American	2*
**Baylor**	**3**
Lower final
Texas–Pan American	5*
**Mississippi State**	**7**

Final
**Baylor**	**6**	—
Mississippi State	3	—

=== West Regional at Los Angeles, CA ===
Quarterfinals
**Cal State Fullerton**	**4**
Santa Clara	0
**Southern California**	**3**
Arizona	2
Lower round 1
Santa Clara	6
**Arizona**	**13**

Semifinals
Cal State Fullerton	2*
**Southern California**	**3***
Lower final
Cal State Fullerton	3
**Arizona**	**7**

Final
**Southern California**	**2**	—
Arizona	0	—

== College World Series ==
=== Participants ===
School	Conference	Record (conference)	Head coach	CWS appearances	CWS best finish	CWS record
Arizona State	WAC	53–10 (15–3)	Jim Brock	9 (last: 1977)	1st (1965, 1967, 1969, 1977)	34–14
Baylor	SWC	32–17–2 (15–9)	Mickey Sullivan	1 (last: 1977)	8th (1977)	0–2
Miami (FL)	n/a	48–10 (n/a)	Ron Fraser	1 (last: 1974)	2nd (1974)	3–2
Michigan	Big 10	29–15 (13–3)	Moby Benedict	2 (last: 1962)	1st (1953)	8–1
North Carolina	ACC	36–15 (9–3)	Mike Roberts	2 (last: 1966)	7th (1960)	0–4
Oral Roberts	n/a	44–10 (n/a)	Larry Cochell	0 (last: none)	none	0–0
St. John's	ECAC	40–16 (n/a)	Joe Russo	4 (last: 1968)	4th (1949, 1966, 1968)	5–8
Southern California	Pac-8	49–9 (15–3)	Rod Dedeaux	16 (last: 1974)	1st (1948, 1958, 1961, 1963, 1968, 1970, 1971, 1972, 1973, 1974)	58–19

=== Results ===
==== Bracket ====
Upper round 1
Michigan	4
Baylor	0
Southern California	9
Miami (FL)	3
Oral Roberts	11
North Carolina	0
Arizona State	13
St. John's	2

Upper round 2
Michigan	3
Southern California	11
Oral Roberts	6
Arizona State	7
Lower round 1
Baylor	1
Miami (FL)	12
North Carolina	9
St. John's	5

Upper final
Southern California	5
Arizona State	2
Lower round 2
Oral Roberts	3
Miami (FL)	5
Michigan	6
North Carolina	7

Semifinals
Southern California	3
North Carolina	2
Arizona State	11
Miami (FL)	3

Final
Southern California	10
Arizona State	3

==== Game results ====
Date	Game	Winner	Score	Loser	Notes
June 2	Game 1	Michigan	4–0	Baylor	
June 2	Game 2	Southern California	9–3	Miami (FL)	
June 3	Game 3	Oral Roberts	11–0	North Carolina	
June 3	Game 4	Arizona State	13–2	St. John's	
June 3	Game 5	Miami (FL)	12–1	Baylor	Baylor eliminated
June 4	Game 6	North Carolina	9–5	St. John's	St. John's eliminated
June 4	Game 7	Southern California	11–3	Michigan	
June 4	Game 8	Arizona State	7–6	Oral Roberts	
June 5	Game 9	North Carolina	7–6	Michigan	Michigan eliminated
June 5	Game 10	Miami (FL)	5–3	Oral Roberts	Oral Roberts eliminated
June 6	Game 11	Southern California	5–2	Arizona State	
June 7	Game 12	Arizona State	11–3	Miami (FL)	Miami eliminated
June 7	Game 13	Southern California	3–2	North Carolina	North Carolina eliminated
June 8	Final	Southern California	10–3	Arizona State	Southern California wins CWS

=== All-Tournament Team ===
The following players were members of the All-Tournament Team.

Position	Player	School
P	Rod Boxberger (MOP)	USC
P	Casey Lindsey	Arizona State
C	Chris Bando	Arizona State
1B	Dave Hostetler	USC
2B	Mike Fox	North Carolina
3B	Bob Horner	Arizona State
SS	Doug Stokke	USC
OF	Tim Tolman	USC
OF	John Wells	USC
OF	Steve Michael	Arizona State
DH	Randy Guerra	Miami (FL)

=== Notable players ===
- Arizona State: Jamie Allen, Chris Bando, Hubie Brooks, Bob Horner, Dave Hudgens
- Baylor: Andy Beene, Jaime Cocanower, Fritzie Connally, Jon Perlman
- Miami (FL): Tony Brewer
- Michigan: Steve Howe, Rick Leach
- North Carolina: Dwight Lowry, Mike Fox
- Oral Roberts: George Bjorkman, Ron Meridith
- Southern California: Bill Bordley, Dave Engle, Dave Hostetler, Jeff Schattinger, Bob Skube, Chris Smith, Tim Tolman, Dave Van Gorder
- St. John's: Michael Beatrice, Doug LaTrenta

== Tournament notes ==
- Chris Bando appears in his fourth College World Series.

== See also ==
- 1978 NCAA Division II baseball tournament
- 1978 NCAA Division III baseball tournament
- 1978 NAIA World Series
