= Rod Boxberger =

American baseball pitcher

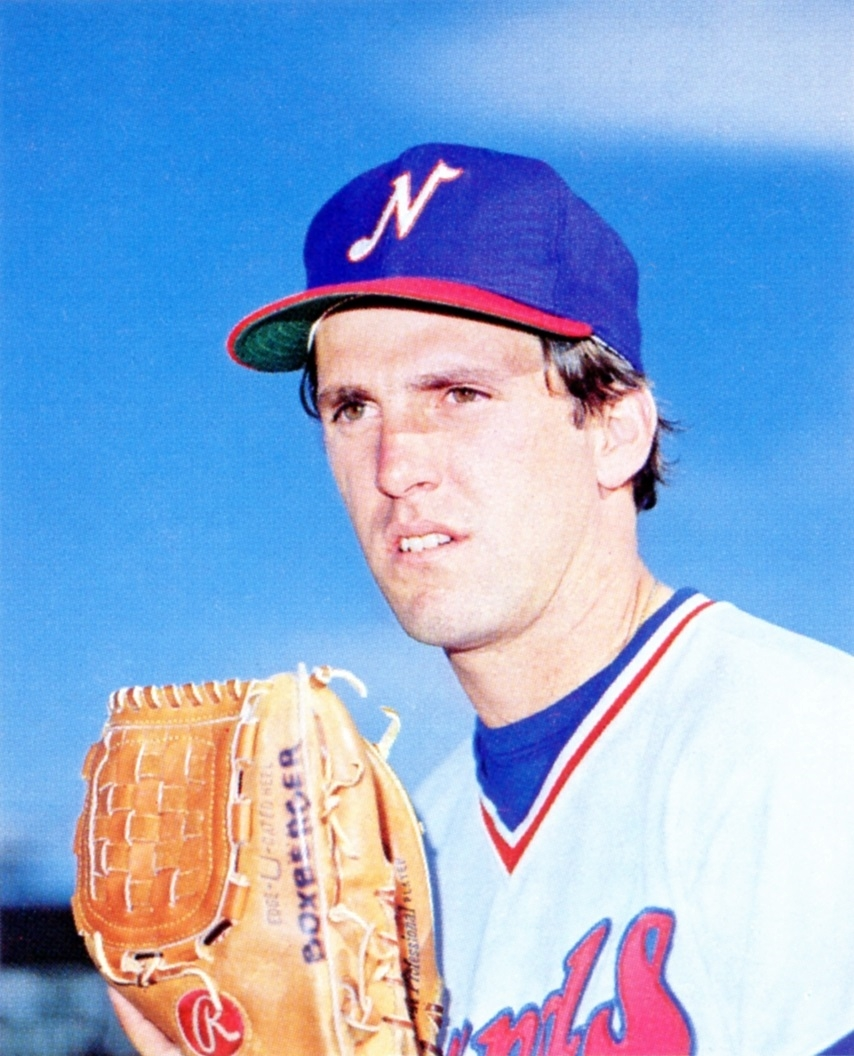
- Boxberger with the Nashville Sounds in 1981
- Pitcher
- Born: August 22, 1957 (age 68); Santa Ana, California, U.S.
- Bats: Right Throws: Right
- Stats at Baseball Reference

Career highlights and awards
- College World Series Most Outstanding Player (1978)

Rodney Warren Boxberger (born August 22, 1957) is an American former baseball pitcher. He won the 1978 College World Series Most Outstanding Player award while a junior at the University of Southern California (USC).

== Professional career ==
Boxberger was drafted twice by two different major league teams. In the 1975 amateur draft, he was taken in the second round by the New York Mets. In 1978, he was taken in the first round, 11th overall, by the Houston Astros. He played six years professionally, never reaching the big leagues.

His first professional season was 1978. He split the season between the Daytona Beach Astros and Columbus Astros. He went 1–2 with a 1.20 ERA in three games with Daytona Beach and 5–5 with a 4.18 ERA in 11 games with Columbus. In 1979, Boxberger played with the Columbus Astros again, going 6–7 with a 4.80 ERA in 21 games. For the third year in a row, Boxberger played with Columbus again in 1980, and for the third year in a row his stats dropped. He went 4–13 with a 5.62 ERA in 23 games in 1980.

He wound up in the New York Yankees organization in 1981, playing for the Double-A Nashville Sounds. He went 4–9 with a 4.54 ERA in 23 games that year. Boxberger played the final two years of his professional career in the California Angels organization. In 1982, he played for the Holyoke Millers, going 5–9 with a 3.78 ERA. He played for the Nashua Angels in 1983, going 5–10 with a 5.43 ERA.

Overall, Boxberger has a career record of 30–55 with a 4.67 ERA in 134 minor league games. He walked 504 batters and struck out 389 in 702 innings.

== Personal ==
Boxberger graduated from Foothill High School in Santa Ana, California. His son, Brad Boxberger, was a reliever in Major League Baseball.
