= 1989 College Baseball All-America Team =

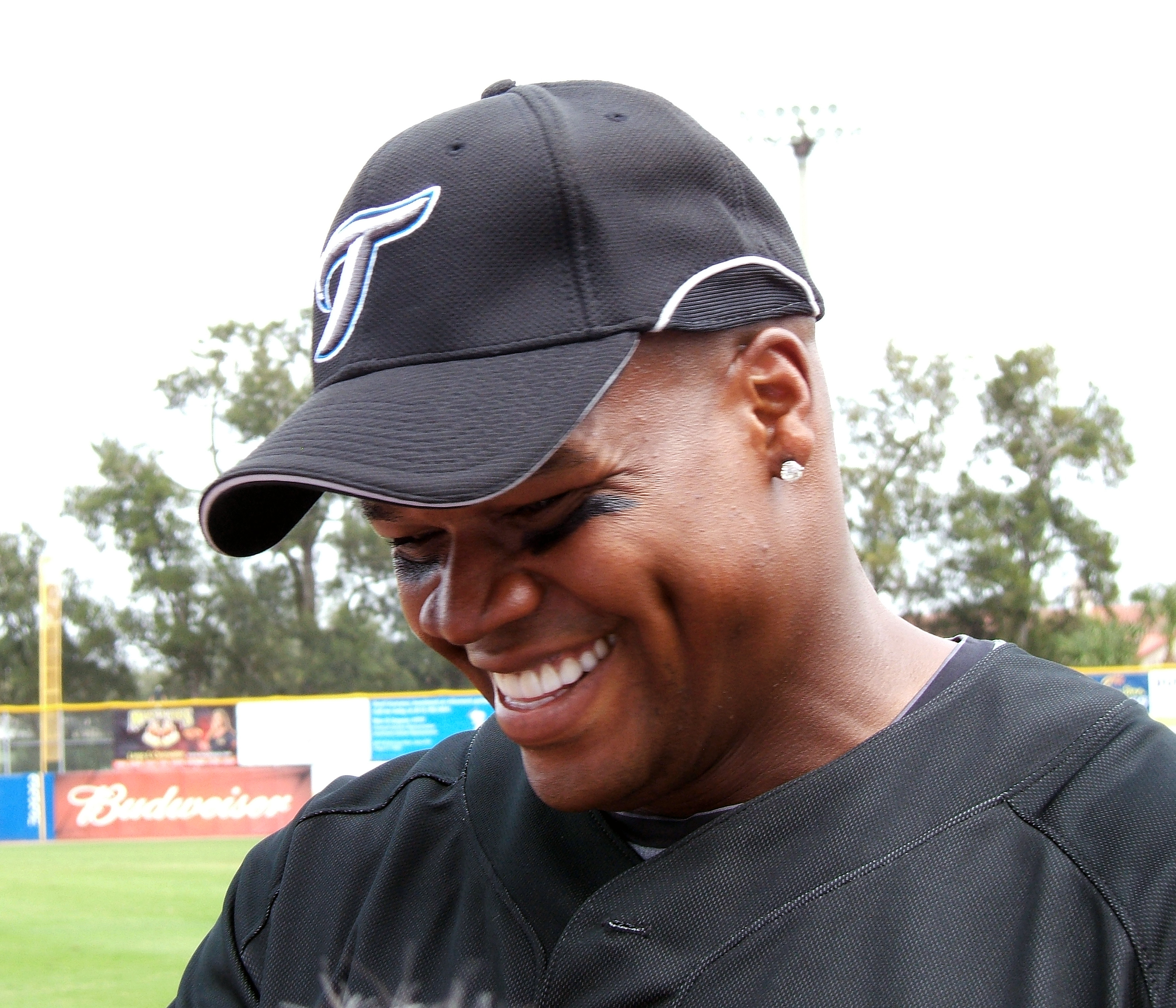
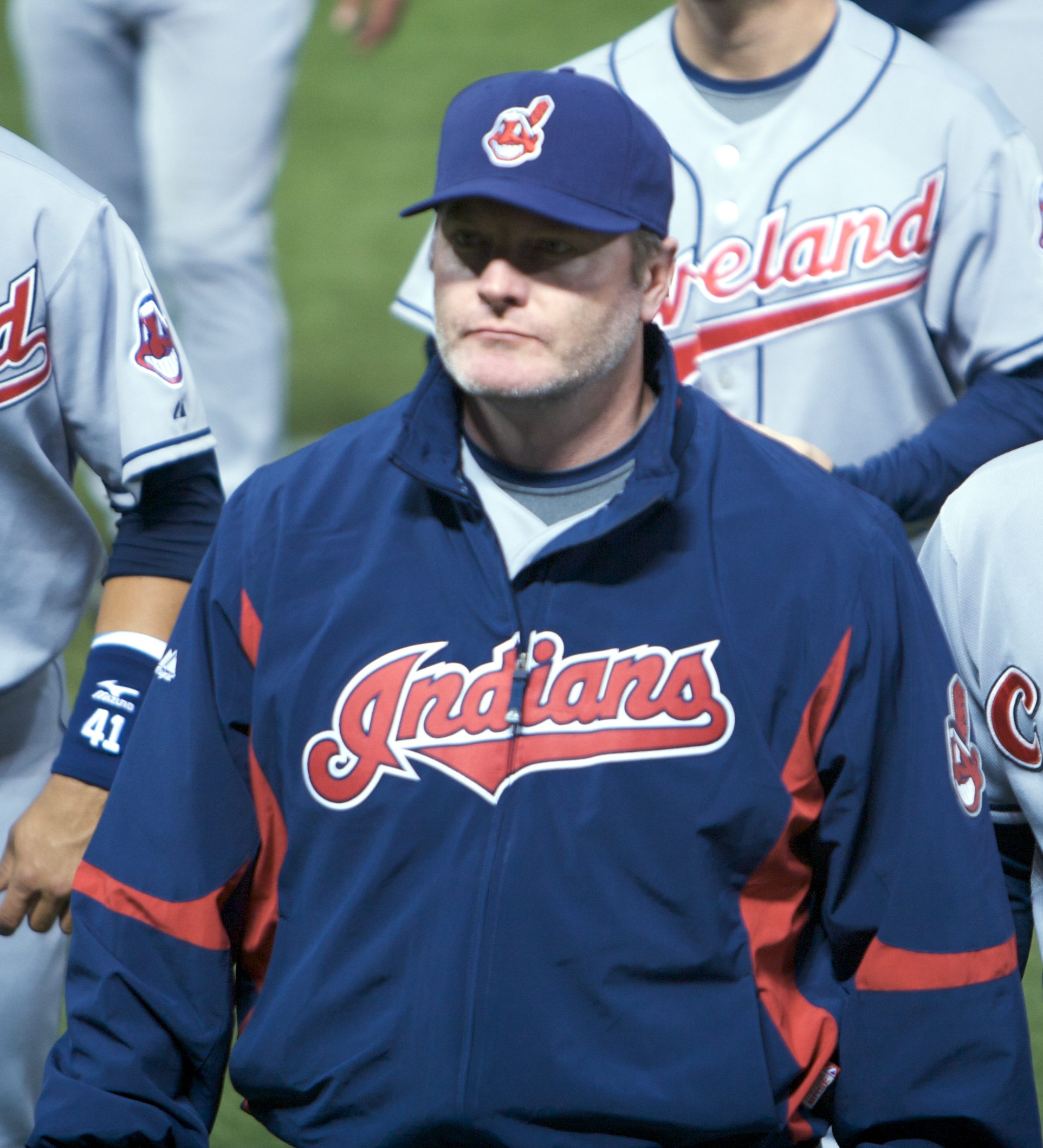
1989 All-Americans included two-time AL MVP Frank Thomas (left) and 2007 AL Manager of the Year Eric Wedge (right).

This is a list of college baseball players named first team All-Americans for the 1989 NCAA Division I baseball season. From 1981 to 1990, there were three generally recognized All-America selectors for baseball: the American Baseball Coaches Association, Baseball America, and The Sporting News. In order to be considered a "consensus" All-American, a player must have been selected by at least two of these.

== Key ==
A	American Baseball Coaches Association
B	Baseball America
S	The Sporting News
	Member of the National College Baseball Hall of Fame
	Consensus All-American – selected by all three organizations
	Consensus All-American – selected by two organizations

== All-Americans ==
Position	Name	School	#	A	B	S	Other awards and honors
Pitcher	Kyle Abbott	Long Beach State	1	—	✓	—	
Pitcher	Brian Barnes	Clemson	2	✓	✓	—	
Pitcher	Kirk Dressendorfer	Texas	1	✓	—	—	
Pitcher	Scott Erickson	Arizona	1	—	✓	—	
Pitcher	Alex Fernandez	Miami (FL)	1	—	✓	—	
Pitcher	Ben McDonald	LSU	3	✓	✓	✓	Golden Spikes Award Baseball America Player of the Year Collegiate Baseball Player of the Year The Sporting News Player of the Year Rotary Smith Award First overall pick in the 1989 MLB draft
Pitcher	Donovan Osborne	UNLV	1	—	—	✓	
Catcher	Eric Wedge	Wichita State	1	✓	—	—	
Catcher	Alan Zinter	Arizona	2	—	✓	✓	
First baseman	Frank Thomas	Auburn	3	✓	✓	✓	
Second baseman	Ed Giovanola	Santa Clara	1	—	—	✓	
Second baseman	Mitch Hannahs	Indiana State	1	✓	—	—	
Second baseman	Terry Taylor	Texas A&M	1	—	✓	—	
Shortstop	Eddie Zosky	Fresno State	3	✓	✓	✓	
Third baseman	John Byington	Texas A&M	3	✓	✓	✓	
Outfielder	Troy Eklund	Arkansas	2	✓	—	✓	
Outfielder	Tom Goodwin	Fresno State	3	✓	✓	✓	
Outfielder	Rick Hirtensteiner	Pepperdine	1	—	✓	—	
Outfielder	Dan Peltier	Notre Dame	2	✓	✓	—	
Designated hitter	Scott Bryant	Texas	3	✓	✓	✓	Dick Howser Trophy ABCA Player of the Year Collegiate Baseball Player of the Year
Designated hitter	Kevin Lofthus	UNLV	1	—	—	✓	
Utility player	Pete Young	Mississippi State	1	✓	—	—	

== See also ==
- List of college baseball awards
