= 1989 NCAA Division I baseball season =

Baseball season

- Number of teams: 270

NCAA tournament

College World Series
- Champions: Wichita State (1st title)
- Runners-up: Texas (25th CWS Appearance)
- Winning coach: Gene Stephenson (1st title)
- MOP: Greg Brummett (Wichita State)

Seasons
- ← 1988 1990 →

The 1989 NCAA Division I baseball season, play of college baseball in the United States organized by the National Collegiate Athletic Association (NCAA) began in the spring of 1989. The season progressed through the regular season and concluded with the 1989 College World Series. The College World Series, held for the forty third time in 1989, consisted of one team from each of eight regional competitions and was held in Omaha, Nebraska, at Johnny Rosenblatt Stadium as a double-elimination tournament. Wichita State claimed the championship for the first time.

== Realignment and format changes ==
- Davidson left the Southern Conference to compete as an Independent. They would return to the SoCon in 1993.
- With Davidson's departure, it became a seven team league, and dissolved its divisional format.

== Conference winners ==
This is a partial list of conference champions from the 1989 season. The NCAA sponsored regional competitions to determine the College World Series participants. Each of the eight regionals consisted of six teams competing in double-elimination tournaments, with the winners advancing to Omaha. 27 teams earned automatic bids by winning their conference championship while 21 teams earned at-large selections.

Conference	Regular season winner	Conference tournament	Tournament venue • city	Tournament winner
Atlantic Coast Conference	North Carolina	1989 Atlantic Coast Conference baseball tournament	Greenville Municipal Stadium • Greenville, SC	Clemson
Big East Conference	North - Providence; South - Seton Hall	1989 Big East Conference baseball tournament	Muzzy Field • Bristol, CT	Villanova
Big Eight Conference	Oklahoma State	1989 Big Eight Conference baseball tournament	All Sports Stadium • Oklahoma City, OK	Oklahoma State
Big Ten Conference	Michigan	1989 Big Ten Conference baseball tournament	Ray Fisher Stadium • Ann Arbor, MI	Illinois
Big West Conference	Fresno State/Long Beach State	No tournament		
Colonial Athletic Association	UNC Wilmington	1989 Colonial Athletic Association baseball tournament	Brooks Field • Wilmington, NC	East Carolina
EIBL	Penn	No tournament		
Metro Conference	Florida State	1989 Metro Conference baseball tournament	Sarge Frye Field • Columbia, SC	Florida State
Mid-American Conference	Western Michigan	No tournament		
Midwestern Collegiate Conference	North - Detroit; South - Evansville	1989 Midwestern Collegiate Conference baseball tournament	South Bend, IN	Notre Dame
Missouri Valley Conference	Wichita State	1989 Missouri Valley Conference baseball tournament	Eck Stadium • Wichita, KS	Indiana State
Mid-Continent Conference	Blue - Cleveland State; Gray - Southwest Missouri State	1989 Mid-Continent Conference baseball tournament	Chicago, IL	Southwest Missouri State
Pacific-10 Conference	North - Washington State; South - Arizona	No tournament		
Southeastern Conference	Mississippi State	1989 Southeastern Conference baseball tournament	Alfred A. McKethan Stadium • Gainesville, FL	Auburn
Southern Conference	Western Carolina	1989 Southern Conference baseball tournament	Asheville, NC	Western Carolina
Southwest Conference	Arkansas/Texas A&M	1989 Southwest Conference baseball tournament	Olsen Field • College Station, TX	Texas A&M
Trans America Athletic Conference	East - Stetson; West - Centenary	1989 Trans America Athletic Conference baseball tournament	Conrad Park • DeLand, FL	Stetson

== Conference standings ==
The following is an incomplete list of conference standings:

1989 Association of Mid-Continent Universities baseball standings
	Conf.						Overall
Team	W		L		T	PCT	W		L		T	PCT
Blue Division
Cleveland State ^{x}‍‍‍	7	–	3	–	0	.700	24	–	21	–	0	.533
UIC ‍‍‍	5	–	4	–	0	.556	33	–	29	–	0	.532
Valparaiso ‍‍‍	3	–	8	–	0	.273	14	–	32	–	1	.309
Gray Division
Southwest Missouri State ^{x}‍‍‡‍	8	–	2	–	0	.800	41	–	10	–	0	.804
Eastern Illinois ‍‍‍	6	–	2	–	0	.750	31	–	19	–	0	.620
Western Illinois ‍‍‍	3	–	7	–	0	.300	20	–	18	–	0	.526
Northern Iowa ‍‍‍	1	–	7	–	0	.125	13	–	37	–	0	.260
‡ – Tournament champion As of June 30, 1989; Rankings from Collegiate Baseball

1989 Atlantic Coast Conference baseball standings
	Conf.				Overall
Team	W		L	PCT	W		L	PCT
No. 8 North Carolina ‍†‍‍^{y}	15	–	4	.789	41	–	18	.695
No. 14 Clemson ‍‍‡‍^{y}	13	–	5	.722	50	–	20	.714
Georgia Tech ‍‍‍^{y}	13	–	6	.684	38	–	26	.594
NC State ‍‍‍	10	–	10	.500	35	–	21	.625
Wake Forest ‍‍‍	9	–	10	.474	35	–	23	.603
Virginia ‍‍‍	7	–	11	.389	25	–	24	.510
Maryland ‍‍‍	4	–	13	.235	17	–	22	.436
Duke ‍‍‍	2	–	14	.125	20	–	23	.465
† – Conference champion ‡ – Tournament champion y – Invited to the NCAA tournament As of June 30, 1989; Rankings from Collegiate Baseball

1989 Big East Conference baseball standings
	Conf.						Overall
Team	W		L		T	PCT	W		L		T	PCT
North Division
Providence ^{x}‍‍‍	12	–	6	–	0	.667	27	–	16	–	0	.628
Connecticut ‍‍‍	9	–	9	–	0	.500	27	–	16	–	0	.628
Boston College ‍‍‍	9	–	9	–	0	.500	20	–	17	–	0	.541
St. John's ‍‍‍	6	–	12	–	0	.333	19	–	19	–	0	.500
South Division
Seton Hall ^{x}‍‍‍	16	–	2	–	0	.889	33	–	19	–	1	.632
Villanova ‍‍‡‍^{y}	12	–	5	–	0	.706	42	–	13	–	0	.764
Georgetown ‍‍‍	7	–	11	–	0	.389	17	–	26	–	0	.395
Pittsburgh ‍‍‍	0	–	17	–	0	.000	6	–	25	–	0	.194
x – Division champion ‡ – Tournament champion y – Invited to the NCAA tournament As of June 30, 1989; Rankings from Collegiate Baseball

1989 Big Ten Conference baseball standings
	Conf.				Overall
Team	W		L	PCT	W		L	PCT
No. 12 Michigan ‍†‍‍^{y}	21	–	6	.778	49	–	16	.754
Iowa ‍‍‍	17	–	11	.607	37	–	20	.649
No. 24 Illinois ‍‍‡‍^{y}	17	–	11	.607	42	–	16	.724
Ohio State ‍‍‍	16	–	12	.571	34	–	27	.557
Minnesota ‍‍‍	15	–	12	.556	31	–	22	.585
Northwestern ‍‍‍	15	–	13	.536	26	–	30	.464
Michigan State ‍‍‍	13	–	15	.464	25	–	26	.490
Purdue ‍‍‍	11	–	17	.393	34	–	25	.576
Wisconsin ‍‍‍	9	–	19	.321	22	–	37	.373
Indiana ‍‍‍	5	–	23	.179	34	–	26	.567
x – Division champion ‡ – Tournament champion y – Invited to the NCAA tournament As of June 30, 1989; Rankings from Collegiate Baseball

1989 Colonial Athletic Association baseball standings
	Conf.						Overall
Team	W		L		T	PCT	W		L		T	PCT
UNC Wilmington ‍†‍‍	14	–	1	–	0	.933	31	–	15	–	0	.674
East Carolina ‍‍‡‍^{y}	12	–	3	–	0	.800	27	–	29	–	1	.482
James Madison ‍‍‍	7	–	6	–	0	.538	32	–	21	–	0	.604
Richmond ‍‍‍	6	–	8	–	0	.429	23	–	24	–	0	.489
George Mason ‍‍‍	3	–	10	–	0	.231	23	–	25	–	0	.479
William & Mary ‍‍‍	0	–	14	–	0	.000	9	–	29	–	0	.237
† – Conference champion ‡ – Tournament champion y – Invited to the NCAA tournament As of June 30, 1989; Rankings from Collegiate Baseball

1989 NCAA Division I baseball independents standings
	Conf.				Overall
Team	W		L	PCT	W		L	PCT
Wright State ‍‍‍		–		–	45	–	12	.789
Nicholls State ‍‍‍^{y}		–		–	44	–	16	.733
No. 6 Miami (FL) ‍‍‍^{y}		–		–	49	–	18	.731
Oral Roberts ‍‍‍		–		–	36	–	18	.667
No. 25 UCF ‍‍‍^{y}		–		–	42	–	22	.656
FIU ‍‍‍		–		–	39	–	21	.650
Southeastern Louisiana ‍‍‍		–		–	33	–	20	.623
UMBC ‍‍‍		–		–	27	–	17	.614
New Mexico State ‍‍‍		–		–	34	–	22	.607
Florida A&M ‍‍‍		–		–	20	–	16	.556
Liberty ‍‍‍		–		–	25	–	24	.510
Tulane ‍‍‍		–		–	27	–	26	.509
Akron ‍‍‍		–		–	24	–	24	.500
Wisconsin–Milwaukee ‍‍‍		–		–	22	–	22	.500
Youngstown State ‍‍‍		–		–	19	–	20	.487
United States International ‍‍‍		–		–	24	–	35	.407
Northern Colorado ‍‍‍		–		–	18	–	29	.383
Davidson ‍‍‍		–		–	12	–	27	.308
y – Invited to the NCAA tournament As of June 30, 1989; Rankings from Collegiate Baseball

1989 Metro Conference baseball standings
	Conf.				Overall
Team	W		L	PCT	W		L	PCT
No. 3 Florida State ‍†‍‡‍^{y}	14	–	4	.778	54	–	18	.750
Virginia Tech ‍‍‍	12	–	6	.667	35	–	22	.614
Southern Miss ‍‍‍	8	–	7	.533	36	–	26	.581
South Carolina ‍‍‍	8	–	7	.533	34	–	23	.596
Memphis State ‍‍‍	8	–	10	.444	32	–	23	.582
Louisville ‍‍‍	6	–	11	.353	27	–	23	.540
Cincinnati ‍‍‍	3	–	14	.176	21	–	30	.412
† – Conference champion ‡ – Tournament champion y – Invited to the NCAA tournament As of June 30, 1989; Rankings from Collegiate Baseball

1989 Midwestern Collegiate Conference baseball standings
	Conf.						Overall
Team	W		L		T	PCT	W		L		T	PCT
North
Detroit ^{x}‍‍‍	20	–	9	–	0	.690	30	–	26	–	1	.535
No. 23 Notre Dame ‍‍‡‍^{y}	27	–	10	–	0	.730	48	–	19	–	1	.713
Xavier ‍‍‍	12	–	15	–	0	.444	12	–	15	–	0	.444
Dayton ‍‍‍	7	–	21	–	0	.250	14	–	40	–	0	.259
South
Evansville ^{x}‍‍‍	13	–	5	–	0	.722	30	–	26	–	0	.536
Saint Louis ‍‍‍	6	–	14	–	0	.300	14	–	37	–	0	.275
Butler ‍‍‍	7	–	18	–	0	.280	12	–	32	–	0	.273
x – Division champion ‡ – Tournament champion y – Invited to the NCAA Tournament; As of June 30, 1989; Rankings from Collegiate Baseball

1989 Missouri Valley Conference baseball standings
	Conf.				Overall
Team	W		L	PCT	W		L	PCT
No. 1 Wichita State ‍†‍‍^{y}	13	–	5	.722	68	–	18	.791
No. 22 Indiana State ‍‍‡‍^{y}	13	–	7	.650	48	–	21	.696
Illinois State ‍‍‍	10	–	10	.500	26	–	34	.433
Creighton ‍‍‍	9	–	11	.450	37	–	26	.587
Bradley ‍‍‍	7	–	11	.389	35	–	22	.614
Southern Illinois ‍‍‍	6	–	14	.300	26	–	38	.406
† – Conference champion ‡ – Tournament champion y – Invited to the NCAA tournament As of June 30, 1989; Rankings from Collegiate Baseball

1989 Southeastern Conference baseball standings
	Conf.				Overall
Team	W		L	PCT	W		L	PCT
No. 10 Mississippi State ‍†‍‍^{y}	20	–	5	.800	54	–	14	.794
No. 4 LSU ‍‍‍^{y}	18	–	9	.667	55	–	17	.764
Florida ‍‍‍^{y}	14	–	10	.583	44	–	22	.667
Georgia ‍‍‍	15	–	11	.577	37	–	25	.597
Alabama ‍‍‍	15	–	11	.577	32	–	24	.571
Auburn ‍‍‡‍^{y}	12	–	12	.500	44	–	20	.688
Vanderbilt ‍‍‍	11	–	15	.423	31	–	21	.596
Ole Miss ‍‍‍	9	–	15	.375	34	–	21	.618
Kentucky ‍‍‍	10	–	17	.370	28	–	25	.528
Tennessee ‍‍‍	4	–	23	.148	23	–	36	.390
† – Conference champion ‡ – Tournament champion y – Invited to the NCAA tournament As of June 30, 1989; Rankings from Collegiate Baseball

1989 Southern Conference baseball standings
	Conf.				Overall
Team	W		L	PCT	W		L	PCT
Western Carolina ‍†‍‡‍^{y}	10	–	5	.667	23	–	31	.426
Marshall ‍‍‍	8	–	5	.615	16	–	14	.533
Appalachian State ‍‍‍	9	–	7	.563	29	–	13	.690
VMI ‍‍‍	8	–	7	.533	16	–	23	.410
The Citadel ‍‍‍	8	–	9	.471	30	–	20	.600
Furman ‍‍‍	5	–	10	.333	13	–	21	.382
East Tennessee State ‍‍‍	5	–	10	.333	10	–	21	.323
† – Conference champion ‡ – SoCon Tournament champion y – Invited to the NCAA tournament As of June 30, 1989; Rankings from Collegiate Baseball

1989 Southwest Conference baseball standings
	Conf.				Overall
Team	W		L	PCT	W		L	PCT
No. 9 Texas A&M ‍†‍‡‍^{y}	17	–	4	.810	58	–	7	.892
No. 5 Arkansas ‍†‍‍^{y}	17	–	4	.810	51	–	16	.761
No. 2 Texas ‍‍‍^{y}	14	–	7	.667	54	–	18	.750
Houston ‍‍‍	9	–	12	.429	43	–	17	.717
Texas Tech ‍‍‍	9	–	12	.429	32	–	22	.593
TCU ‍‍‍	7	–	14	.333	37	–	22	.627
Baylor ‍‍‍	7	–	14	.333	32	–	19	.627
Rice ‍‍‍	4	–	17	.190	28	–	30	.483
† – Conference champion ‡ – Tournament champion y – Invited to the NCAA tournament As of June 30, 1989; Rankings from Collegiate Baseball

1989 Trans America Athletic Conference baseball standings
	Conf.				Overall
Team	W		L	PCT	W		L	PCT
East
Stetson ^{x}‍†‍‡‍^{y}	13	–	5	.722	38	–	23	.623
Georgia Southern ‍‍‍	12	–	6	.667	33	–	27	.550
Samford ‍‍‍	7	–	11	.389	17	–	30	.362
Mercer ‍‍‍	4	–	14	.222	16	–	35	.314
West
Centenary ^{x}‍‍‍	10	–	6	.625	31	–	21	.596
Arkansas–Little Rock ‍‍‍	7	–	9	.438	28	–	25	.528
Hardin–Simmons ‍‍‍	7	–	9	.438	25	–	30	.455
x – Division champion † – Conference champion ‡ – Tournament champion y – Invited to the NCAA tournament As of June 30, 1989; Rankings from Collegiate Baseball

== College World Series ==
The 1989 season marked the forty third NCAA baseball tournament, which culminated with the eight team College World Series. The College World Series was held in Omaha, Nebraska. The eight teams played a double-elimination format, with Wichita State claiming their first championship with a 5–3 win over Texas in the final.

First round
1	Florida State	4
8	North Carolina	2
4	Wichita State	3
5	Arkansas	1
8	North Carolina	3
5	Arkansas	7
2	Texas	7
7	Long Beach State	1
3	Miami (FL)	5
6	LSU	2
7	Long Beach State	5
6	LSU	8

Second round
1	Florida State	4
4	Wichita State	2
5	Arkansas	4
4	Wichita State	8
2	Texas	12
3	Miami (FL)	2
6	LSU	6
3	Miami (FL)	3

Semifinals
1	Florida State	4	9
4	Wichita State	7	12
2	Texas	12	—
6	LSU	7	—

Finals
4	Wichita State	5
2	Texas	3
