= 1989 North Carolina Tar Heels baseball team =

American college baseball season

1989 North Carolina Tar Heels baseball

Atlantic Coast champions South Regional champions

College World Series, T-7th
- Conference: Atlantic Coast
- CB: No. 8
- Record: 41–18–1 (15–4 ACC)
- Head coach: Mike Roberts (12th season)
- Home stadium: Boshamer Stadium

1989 Atlantic Coast Conference baseball standings
	Conf.				Overall
Team	W		L	PCT	W		L	PCT
No. 8 North Carolina ‍†‍‍^{y}	15	–	4	.789	41	–	18	.695
No. 14 Clemson ‍‍‡‍^{y}	13	–	5	.722	50	–	20	.714
Georgia Tech ‍‍‍^{y}	13	–	6	.684	38	–	26	.594
NC State ‍‍‍	10	–	10	.500	35	–	21	.625
Wake Forest ‍‍‍	9	–	10	.474	35	–	23	.603
Virginia ‍‍‍	7	–	11	.389	25	–	24	.510
Maryland ‍‍‍	4	–	13	.235	17	–	22	.436
Duke ‍‍‍	2	–	14	.125	20	–	23	.465
† – Conference champion ‡ – Tournament champion y – Invited to the NCAA tournament As of June 30, 1989; Rankings from Collegiate Baseball

The 1989 North Carolina Tar Heels baseball team represented University of North Carolina at Chapel Hill in the 1989 NCAA Division I baseball season. The Tar Heels played their home games at Boshamer Stadium. The team was coached by Mike Roberts in his 12th year as head coach at North Carolina.

The Tar Heels won the South Regional playoff to advance to the College World Series, where they were defeated by the Arkansas Razorbacks.

== Roster ==
1989 North Carolina Tar Heels baseball team
Players
Coaches

#	Pos.	Name	B/T	Height	Weight	Year	Home town
		Dave Arendas	/	—	—	Jr
		Steve Bieneman	/	—	—	So
		Chris Cornacchio	/	—	—	Sr
	RHP	Jim Dougherty	R/R	6 ft 0 in (1.83 m)	210 lb (95 kg)	Jr	Brentwood, New York
		Steve Estroff	/	—	—	So
		Rich Fernandez	/	—	—	So
		Kreg Gresham	/	—	—	Sr
		Bobby Honeycutt	/	—	—	Sr
		Michael Hoog	/	—	—	Jr
		Ryan Howison	/	—	—	Jr
		Scott Hughes	/	—	—	Fr
		Ryan Jackson	/	—	—
	INF	Mark Kingston	S/R	6 ft 4 in (1.93 m)	210 lb (95 kg)	Fr	Dumfries, Virginia
		Mike Lanier	/	—	—
	C	Jesse Levis	L/R	5 ft 9 in (1.75 m)	180 lb (82 kg)	Jr	Philadelphia, Pennsylvania
	RHP	Scott Lodgek	/R	6 ft 4 in (1.93 m)	195 lb (88 kg)	Jr	Anderson, South Carolina
		Frank Maney	/	—	—	Fr
	LHP	Derek Manning	L/L	6 ft 4 in (1.93 m)	220 lb (100 kg)	Fr	Wilmington, North Carolina
	INF	Ron Maurer	R/R	6 ft 1 in (1.85 m)	185 lb (84 kg)	Jr	Jersey City, New Jersey
		Mike Miller	/	—	—
		Tom Nevin	/	—	—	Jr
		Todd Nichols	/	—	—	So
		Dedric Powell	/	—	—
		Craig Scott	/	—	—
		Jerry Smith	/	—	—	So
	RHP	John Thoden	R/R	5 ft 11 in (1.8 m)	170 lb (77 kg)	Jr	Medford, New York
		Darren Villani	/	—	—	So
	LHP	Brad Woodall	S/L	6 ft 0 in (1.83 m)	175 lb (79 kg)	So	Columbia, South Carolina
		Matt Wooten	/	—	—	So

Head coach

Mike Roberts

Assistant coach(es)

Legend

- (C) Team captain
- (S) Suspended
- (I) Ineligible
- Injured
- Current redshirt

== Schedule ==
1989 North Carolina Tar Heels baseball game log
Regular season
February (2–1)

#	Date	Opponent	Site/stadium	Score	Overall record	ACC record
1	February 15	at Coastal Carolina	Vrooman Field • Conway, South Carolina	4–2	1–0	–
2	February 25	at The Citadel	College Park • Charleston, South Carolina	2–0	2–0	–
3	February 25	at The Citadel	College Park • Charleston, South Carolina	5–6	2–1	–

March (10–7)

#	Date	Opponent	Site/stadium	Score	Overall record	ACC record
4	March 1	at Coastal Carolina	Vrooman Field • Conway, South Carolina	10–14	2–2	–
5	March 4	Seton Hall	Boshamer Stadium • Chapel Hill, North Carolina	11–4	3–2	–
6	March 4	Seton Hall	Boshamer Stadium • Chapel Hill, North Carolina	2–1	4–2	–
7	March 5	Seton Hall	Boshamer Stadium • Chapel Hill, North Carolina	3–2	5–2	–
8	March 10	NC State	Boshamer Stadium • Chapel Hill, North Carolina	5–7	5–3	0–1
9	March 13	vs U.S. International	Pete Beiden Field • Fresno, California	9–8	6–3	0–1
10	March 14	vs Washington State	Pete Beiden Field • Fresno, California	1–8	6–4	0–1
11	March 15	vs Kansas State	Pete Beiden Field • Fresno, California	6–7	6–5	0–1
12	March 16	at Fresno State	Pete Beiden Field • Fresno, California	4–9	6–6	0–1
13	March 17	vs Liberty	Pete Beiden Field • Fresno, California	6–4	7–6	0–1
14	March 18	vs Missouri	Pete Beiden Field • Fresno, California	2–0	8–6	0–1
15	March 21	Tennessee	Boshamer Stadium • Chapel Hill, North Carolina	6–4	9–6	0–1
16	March 24	Georgia Tech	Boshamer Stadium • Chapel Hill, North Carolina	6–1	10–6	1–1
17	March 25	Clemson	Boshamer Stadium • Chapel Hill, North Carolina	3–4	10–7	1–2
18	March 26	Clemson	Boshamer Stadium • Chapel Hill, North Carolina	3–0	11–7	2–2
19	March 28	Pace	Boshamer Stadium • Chapel Hill, North Carolina	1–2	11–8	2–2
20	March 29	Pace	Boshamer Stadium • Chapel Hill, North Carolina	3–2	12–8	2–2

April (17–4–1)

#	Date	Opponent	Site/stadium	Score	Overall record	ACC record
21	April 1	at Virginia	UVA Baseball Field • Charlottesville, Virginia	4–3	13–8	3–2
22	April 2	at Virginia	UVA Baseball Field • Charlottesville, Virginia	10–5	14–8	4–2
23	April 3	Campbell	Boshamer Stadium • Chapel Hill, North Carolina	6–2	15–8	4–2
24	April 4	at Duke	Jack Coombs Field • Durham, North Carolina	6–3	16–8	5–2
25	April 8	Maryland	Boshamer Stadium • Chapel Hill, North Carolina	7–3	17–8	6–2
26	April 9	Virginia	Boshamer Stadium • Chapel Hill, North Carolina	5–4	18–8	7–2
27	April 11	at Duke	Jack Coombs Field • Durham, North Carolina	4–2	19–8	8–2
28	April 12	UNC Wilmington	Boshamer Stadium • Chapel Hill, North Carolina	3–5	19–9	8–2
29	April 13	Cosstal Carolina	Boshamer Stadium • Chapel Hill, North Carolina	2–1	20–9	8–2
30	April 13	Cosstal Carolina	Boshamer Stadium • Chapel Hill, North Carolina	3–5	20–10	8–2
31	April 16	NC State	Boshamer Stadium • Chapel Hill, North Carolina	7–6	21–10	9–2
32	April 16	NC State	Boshamer Stadium • Chapel Hill, North Carolina	4–1	22–10	10–2
33	April 18	Duke	Boshamer Stadium • Chapel Hill, North Carolina	4–1	23–10	11–2
34	April 19	Wake Forest	Boshamer Stadium • Chapel Hill, North Carolina	3–7	23–11	11–3
35	April 21	at Georgia Tech	Russ Chandler Stadium • Atlanta, Georgia	12–9	24–11	12–3
36	April 22	at Georgia Tech	Russ Chandler Stadium • Atlanta, Georgia	1–2	24–12	12–4
37	April 23	at Clemson	Beautiful Tiger Field • Clemson, South Carolina	4–3	25–12	13–4
38	April 25	Wake Forest	Boshamer Stadium • Chapel Hill, North Carolina	6–4	26–12	14–4
39	April 26	at Wake Forest	Ernie Shore Field • Winston-Salem, North Carolina	4–3	27–12	15–4
40	April 27	Charlotte	Boshamer Stadium • Chapel Hill, North Carolina	4–4	27–12–1	15–4
41	April 28	at Davidson	Wildcat Park • Davidson, North Carolina	10–2	28–12–1	15–4
42	April 29	Davidson	Boshamer Stadium • Chapel Hill, North Carolina	6–3	29–12–1	15–4

May (2–0)

#	Date	Opponent	Site/stadium	Score	Overall record	ACC record
43	May 9	East Carolina	Boshamer Stadium • Chapel Hill, North Carolina	14–4	30–12–1	15–4
44	May 10	at VCU	The Diamond • Richmond, Virginia	4–1	31–12–1	15–4

Postseason
ACC Tournament (3–2)

#	Date	Opponent	Site/stadium	Score	Overall record	ACC record
46	vs May 13	vs Duke	Greenville Municipal Stadium • Greenville, South Carolina	6–4	32–12–1	15–4
47	vs May 14	vs NC State	Greenville Municipal Stadium • Greenville, South Carolina	4–2	33–12–1	15–4
48	vs May 15	vs Clemson	Greenville Municipal Stadium • Greenville, South Carolina	4–5	33–13–1	15–4
49	vs May 16	vs Wake Forest	Greenville Municipal Stadium • Greenville, South Carolina	6–2	34–13–1	15–4
50	vs May 16	vs Clemson	Greenville Municipal Stadium • Greenville, South Carolina	4–12	34–14–1	15–4

Carolina Invitational (3–1)

#	Date	Opponent	Site/stadium	Score	Overall record	ACC record
51	May 19	New Orleans	Boshamer Stadium • Chapel Hill, North Carolina	3–2	35–14–1	15–4
52	May 20	Arizona	Boshamer Stadium • Chapel Hill, North Carolina	5–3	36–14–1	15–4
53	May 21	NC State	Boshamer Stadium • Chapel Hill, North Carolina	5–1	37–14–1	15–4
54	May 22	Clemson	Boshamer Stadium • Chapel Hill, North Carolina	0–7	37–15–1	15–4

NCAA South Regional (4–1)

#	Date	Opponent	Site/stadium	Score	Overall record	ACC record
55	May 25	vs Nicholls State	Dudy Noble Field • Starkville, Mississippi	8–4	38–15–1	15–4
56	May 26	vs Jacksonville	Dudy Noble Field • Starkville, Mississippi	8–3	39–15–1	15–4
57	May 27	at Mississippi State	Dudy Noble Field • Starkville, Mississippi	2–1	40–15–1	15–4
58	May 27	at Mississippi State	Dudy Noble Field • Starkville, Mississippi	0–6	40–16–1	15–4
59	May 28	at Mississippi State	Dudy Noble Field • Starkville, Mississippi	7–1	41–16–1	15–4

College World Series (0–2)

#	Date	Opponent	Site/stadium	Score	Overall record	ACC record
60	June 2	vs Florida State	Johnny Rosenblatt Stadium • Omaha, Nebraska	2–4	41–17–1	15–4
61	June 4	vs Arkansas	Johnny Rosenblatt Stadium • Omaha, Nebraska	3–7	41–18–1	15–4

== Awards and honors ==
Jesse Levis

- First Team All-ACC
- Third Team All-American American Baseball Coaches Association

Ron Maurer

- Second Team All-ACC

John Thoden

- Second Team All-ACC
- Third Team All-American Baseball America
