= 1989 Colonial Athletic Association baseball tournament =

American college baseball tournament

- Teams: 6
- Format: Double-elimination tournament
- Finals site: Brooks Field; Wilmington, North Carolina
- Champions: East Carolina (2nd title)
- Winning coach: Gary Overton (2nd title)
- MVP: Brien Berckman (East Carolina)

1989 Colonial Athletic Association baseball standings
	Conf.						Overall
Team	W		L		T	PCT	W		L		T	PCT
UNC Wilmington ‍†‍‍	14	–	1	–	0	.933	31	–	15	–	0	.674
East Carolina ‍‍‡‍^{y}	12	–	3	–	0	.800	27	–	29	–	1	.482
James Madison ‍‍‍	7	–	6	–	0	.538	32	–	21	–	0	.604
Richmond ‍‍‍	6	–	8	–	0	.429	23	–	24	–	0	.489
George Mason ‍‍‍	3	–	10	–	0	.231	23	–	25	–	0	.479
William & Mary ‍‍‍	0	–	14	–	0	.000	9	–	29	–	0	.237
† – Conference champion ‡ – Tournament champion y – Invited to the NCAA tournament As of June 30, 1989; Rankings from Collegiate Baseball

The 1989 Colonial Athletic Association baseball tournament was held at Brooks Field on the campus of UNC Wilmington in Wilmington, North Carolina, from May 12 through 15. The event determined the champion of the Colonial Athletic Association for the 1989 season. The winner of the tournament, second-seeded East Carolina, earned the CAA's automatic bid to the 1989 NCAA Division I baseball tournament.

For the first three years of the event, a different team won the Tournament. Richmond, East Carolina, and George Mason each won once. With their victory in 1989, East Carolina became the first program to win multiple championships. During their tenure in the CAA which ended after the 2001 season, the Pirates would claim seven titles overall.

== Format and seeding ==
The CAA's six teams were seeded one to six based on winning percentage from the conference's round robin regular season. They played a double-elimination tournament with first round matchups of the top and bottom seeds, second and fifth seeds, and third and fourth seeds.

Team	W	L	Pct.	GB	Seed
UNC Wilmington	14	1	.933	—	1
East Carolina	12	3	.800	2	2
James Madison	7	6	.538	6	3
Richmond	6	8	.429	7.5	4
George Mason	3	10	.231	10	5
William & Mary	0	14	.000	13.5	6

== Bracket and results ==
First round
1	UNC Wilmington	8
6	William & Mary	4
3	James Madison	1
4	Richmond	7
2	East Carolina	2
5	George Mason	4

Second round
1	UNC Wilmington	1
2	East Carolina	6
6	William & Mary	1
3	James Madison	6
4	Richmond	1
5	George Mason	4
1	UNC Wilmington	2
4	Richmond	7

Third round
2	East Carolina	4
3	James Madison	3
5	George Mason	3
4	Richmond	7

Semifinals
2	East Carolina	4
5	George Mason	2

Final
2	East Carolina	4^{11}
4	Richmond	1

== Most Valuable Player ==
Brien Berckman was named Tournament Most Valuable Player. Berckman was a pitcher for East Carolina.
