= 1989 Midwestern Collegiate Conference baseball tournament =

- Teams: 7
- Format: Double-elimination
- Finals site: Stanley Coveleski Regional Stadium; South Bend, Indiana
- Champions: Notre Dame (1st title)
- Winning coach: Jim Brownlee (2nd title)

1989 Midwestern Collegiate Conference baseball standings
	Conf.						Overall
Team	W		L		T	PCT	W		L		T	PCT
North
Detroit ^{x}‍‍‍	17	–	7	–	0	.708	30	–	26	–	1	.535
No. 23 Notre Dame ‍‍‡‍^{y}	15	–	9	–	0	.625	48	–	19	–	1	.713
Xavier ‍‍‍	10	–	12	–	0	.455	20	–	37	–	0	.351
Dayton ‍‍‍	4	–	18	–	0	.182	14	–	40	–	0	.259
South
Evansville ^{x}‍‍‍	12	–	3	–	0	.800	30	–	26	–	0	.536
Saint Louis ‍‍‍	6	–	10	–	0	.375	14	–	37	–	0	.275
Butler ‍‍‍	5	–	10	–	0	.333	12	–	32	–	0	.273
x – Division champion ‡ – Tournament champion y – Invited to the NCAA Tournament; As of June 30, 1989; Rankings from Collegiate Baseball

The 1989 Midwestern Collegiate Conference baseball tournament took place in May 1989, near the close of the 1989 NCAA Division I baseball season. All seven of the league's teams met in the double-elimination tournament held at Stanley Coveleski Regional Stadium home stadium of Notre Dame in South Bend, Indiana. Third seeded Notre Dame won their first league championship. They Fighting Irish qualified for the 1989 NCAA Division I baseball tournament.

== Seeding and format ==
The league's teams are seeded one through seven based on conference results. The top seed received a single bye, with remaining teams facing off in the opening round.

Team	W	L	PCT	GB	Seed
North
Detroit	17	7	.708	—	2
Notre Dame	15	9	.625	2	3
Xavier	10	12	.455	6	4
Dayton	4	18	.182	12	7

Team	W	L	Pct.	GB	Seed
South
Evansville	12	3	.800	—	1
Saint Louis	6	10	.375	6.5	5
Butler	5	10	.333	7	6

== Bracket and results ==
Upper round 1	Upper round 2	Upper final	Final
1	Evansville	5
4	Xavier	4
4	Xavier	10
5	Saint Louis	4
1	Evansville	2
2	Detroit	3 ^{(10)}
3	Notre Dame	13
6	Butler	1
3	Notre Dame	15
2	Detroit	16 ^{(15)}
2	Detroit	14
7	Dayton	4
2	Detroit	1	10
3	Notre Dame	4	21
Lower round 1	Lower round 2	Lower round 3	Lower final
4	Xavier	9
6	Butler	1	6	Dayton	11 ^{(11)}	1	Evansville	2
7	Dayton	8	6	Dayton	4	3	Notre Dame	11
3	Notre Dame	20
3	Notre Dame	10
5	Saint Louis	6
