= 1989 Atlantic Coast Conference baseball tournament =

American college baseball tournament

- Teams: 8
- Format: Eight-team double elimination
- Finals site: Greenville Municipal Stadium; Greenville, South Carolina
- Champions: Clemson (5th title)
- Winning coach: Bill Wilhelm (5th title)
- MVP: Brian Barnes (Clemson)
- Attendance: 40,078

1989 Atlantic Coast Conference baseball standings
	Conf.				Overall
Team	W		L	PCT	W		L	PCT
No. 8 North Carolina ‍†‍‍^{y}	15	–	4	.789	41	–	18	.695
No. 14 Clemson ‍‍‡‍^{y}	13	–	5	.722	50	–	20	.714
Georgia Tech ‍‍‍^{y}	13	–	6	.684	38	–	26	.594
NC State ‍‍‍	10	–	10	.500	35	–	21	.625
Wake Forest ‍‍‍	9	–	10	.474	35	–	23	.603
Virginia ‍‍‍	7	–	11	.389	25	–	24	.510
Maryland ‍‍‍	4	–	13	.235	17	–	22	.436
Duke ‍‍‍	2	–	14	.125	20	–	23	.465
† – Conference champion ‡ – Tournament champion y – Invited to the NCAA tournament As of June 30, 1989; Rankings from Collegiate Baseball

The 1989 Atlantic Coast Conference baseball tournament was held in Greenville, SC from May 13 through 16. Clemson won the tournament and earned the Atlantic Coast Conference's automatic bid to the 1989 NCAA Division I baseball tournament.

== Seeding ==
Team	W	L	PCT	GB	Seed
North Carolina	15	4	.789	–	1
Clemson	13	5	.722	1.5	2
Georgia Tech	13	6	.684	2	3
NC State	10	10	.500	5.5	4
Wake Forest	9	10	.474	6	5
Virginia	7	11	.389	7.5	6
Maryland	4	13	.235	10	7
Duke	2	14	.125	11.5	8

== Tournament ==
Upper round 1
8	Duke	4
1	North Carolina	6
5	Wake Forest	1
4	NC State	2
6	Virginia	0
3	Georgia Tech	3
7	Maryland	0
2	Clemson	8

Upper round 2
1	North Carolina	4
4	NC State	3
2	Clemson	9
3	Georgia Tech	3
Lower round 1
8	Duke	0
5	Wake Forest	10
6	Virginia	7
7	Maryland	3

Upper final
1	North Carolina	4
2	Clemson	5
Lower round 2
3	Georgia Tech	3
5	Wake Forest	5
4	NC State	11
6	Virginia	8

Semifinals
2	Clemson	9
4	NC State	2
5	Wake Forest	2
1	North Carolina	6

Final
2	Clemson	12
1	North Carolina	4

== All-Tournament Team ==
Position	Player	School
1B	Mike Milchin	Clemson
2B	Henry Threadgill	Clemson
3B	Neil Avent	Wake Forest
SS	Rusty Charpia	Clemson
C	Jesse Levis	North Carolina
OF	Brian Kowitz	Clemson
OF	Todd Nichols	North Carolina
OF	Chris Kughn	Virginia
DH	Brad Woodall	North Carolina
SP	Brian Barnes	Clemson
RP	Frank Humber	Wake Forest
MVP	Brian Barnes	Clemson

(*)Denotes Unanimous Selection

== See also ==
- College World Series
- NCAA Division I Baseball Championship
