= 1989 Trans America Athletic Conference baseball tournament =

American college baseball tournament

- Teams: 4
- Format: Double-elimination
- Finals site: Conrad Park; DeLand, Florida
- Champions: Stetson (2nd title)
- Winning coach: Pete Dunn (2nd title)
- MVP: Mike Pinckes (Stetson)

1989 Trans America Athletic Conference baseball standings
	Conf.				Overall
Team	W		L	PCT	W		L	PCT
East
Stetson ^{x}‍†‍‡‍^{y}	13	–	5	.722	38	–	23	.623
Georgia Southern ‍‍‍	12	–	6	.667	33	–	27	.550
Samford ‍‍‍	7	–	11	.389	17	–	30	.362
Mercer ‍‍‍	4	–	14	.222	16	–	35	.314
West
Centenary ^{x}‍‍‍	10	–	6	.625	31	–	21	.596
Arkansas–Little Rock ‍‍‍	7	–	9	.438	28	–	25	.528
Hardin–Simmons ‍‍‍	7	–	9	.438	25	–	30	.455
x – Division champion † – Conference champion ‡ – Tournament champion y – Invited to the NCAA tournament As of June 30, 1989; Rankings from Collegiate Baseball

The 1989 Trans America Athletic Conference baseball tournament was held at Conrad Park on the campus of Stetson University in DeLand, Florida. This was the eleventh tournament championship held by the Trans America Athletic Conference, in its eleventh year of existence. Stetson won their second consecutive and overall tournament championship and earned the conference's automatic bid to the 1989 NCAA Division I baseball tournament.

== Format and seeding ==
The top two finishers from each division by conference winning percentage qualified for the tournament, with the top seed from one division playing the second seed from the opposite in the first round.

Team	W	L	Pct.	GB	Seed
East
Stetson	13	5	.722	—	1E
Georgia Southern	12	6	.667	1	2E
Samford	7	11	.389	6	—
Mercer	4	14	.222	9	—

Team	W	L	Pct.	GB	Seed
West
Centenary	10	6	.625	—	1W
Arkansas–Little Rock	7	9	.438	3	2W
Hardin–Simmons	7	9	.438	3	—

== Bracket ==
First round
1E	Stetson	8
2W	Arkansas–Little Rock	2
1W	Centenary	11
2E	Georgia Southern	10
Lower round 1
2W	Arkansas–Little Rock	0
2E	Georgia Southern	12

Semi-finals
1E	Stetson	10
1W	Centenary	7
Lower final
1W	Centenary	8
2E	Georgia Southern	4

Finals
1E	Stetson	4	5^{10}
1W	Centenary	8	4

== All-Tournament Team ==
The following players were named to the All-Tournament Team.

POS	Player	School
P	George Tsamis	Stetson
P	Tom Hickox	Stetson
C	Rob Fitzpatrick	Georgia Southern
1B	Todd Wilson	Centenary
2B	Doug Barrington	Centenary
3B	Mike Pinckes	Stetson
SS	Wes Weger	Stetson
OF	Mike Sempeles	Stetson
OF	Chris Abner	Georgia Southern
OF	Byron Copeland	Centenary
OF	Shawn McKennon	Centenary
DH	Mike Yuro	Georgia Southern

=== Most Valuable Player ===
Mike Pinckes was named Tournament Most Valuable Player. Pinckes was a third baseman for Stetson.
