= 1989 ACC tournament =

1989 ACC tournament may refer to:

- 1989 ACC men's basketball tournament
- 1989 ACC women's basketball tournament
- 1989 ACC men's soccer tournament
- 1989 ACC women's soccer tournament
- 1989 Atlantic Coast Conference baseball tournament
