= 1989 Southwest Conference baseball tournament =

- Teams: 4
- Format: Double-elimination tournament
- Finals site: Olsen Field; College Station, TX
- Champions: Texas A&M (2nd title)
- Winning coach: Mark Johnson (2nd title)

1989 Southwest Conference baseball standings
	Conf.				Overall
Team	W		L	PCT	W		L	PCT
No. 9 Texas A&M ‍†‍‡‍^{y}	17	–	4	.810	58	–	7	.892
No. 5 Arkansas ‍†‍‍^{y}	17	–	4	.810	51	–	16	.761
No. 2 Texas ‍‍‍^{y}	14	–	7	.667	54	–	18	.750
Houston ‍‍‍	9	–	12	.429	43	–	17	.717
Texas Tech ‍‍‍	9	–	12	.429	32	–	22	.593
TCU ‍‍‍	7	–	14	.333	37	–	22	.627
Baylor ‍‍‍	7	–	14	.333	32	–	19	.627
Rice ‍‍‍	4	–	17	.190	28	–	30	.483
† – Conference champion ‡ – Tournament champion y – Invited to the NCAA tournament As of June 30, 1989; Rankings from Collegiate Baseball

The 1989 Southwest Conference baseball tournament was the league's annual postseason tournament used to determine the Southwest Conference's (SWC) automatic bid to the 1989 NCAA Division I baseball tournament. The tournament was held from May 18 through 20 at Olsen Field on the campus of Texas A&M University in College Station, Texas.

The number 1 seed Texas A&M Aggies went 3–0 to win the team's second SWC tournament under head coach Mark Johnson.

== Format and seeding ==
The tournament featured the top four finishers of the SWC's eight teams in a double-elimination tournament.

Texas A&M won the tiebreaker over Arkansas based on a 2–1 head to head record.

Place	Team	Conference				Overall			Seed
Place	Team	W	L	%	GB	W	L	%	Seed
1	Texas A&M	17	4	.810	-	58	7	.892	1
2	Arkansas	17	4	.810	0	51	16	.761	2
3	Texas	14	7	.667	3	54	18	.750	3
4	Houston	9	12	.429	8	43	17	.717	4
5	Texas Tech	9	12	.429	8	32	22	.593	-
6	TCU	7	14	.333	10	37	22	.627	-
7	Baylor	7	14	.333	10	32	19	.627	-
8	Rice	4	17	.190	13	28	30	.483	-

== Tournament ==
Upper round 1
1	Texas A&M	15
4	Houston	3
2	Arkansas	3
3	Texas	8
Lower round 1
4	Houston	4
2	Arkansas	5

Upper final
1	Texas A&M	15
3	Texas	6
Lower final
3	Texas	9
2	Arkansas	1

Final
1	Texas A&M	5	–
3	Texas	4	–
