= 1989 Big Ten baseball tournament =

1989 Big Ten Conference baseball tournament
- Teams: 4
- Format: Double-elimination
- Finals site: Ray Fisher Stadium; Ann Arbor, MI
- Champions: Illinois (1st title)
- Winning coach: Augie Garrido (1st title)
- MVP: Rich Capparelli (Illinois)

1989 Big Ten Conference baseball standings
	Conf.				Overall
Team	W		L	PCT	W		L	PCT
No. 12 Michigan ‍†‍‍^{y}	21	–	6	.778	49	–	16	.754
Iowa ‍‍‍	17	–	11	.607	37	–	20	.649
No. 24 Illinois ‍‍‡‍^{y}	17	–	11	.607	42	–	16	.724
Ohio State ‍‍‍	16	–	12	.571	34	–	27	.557
Minnesota ‍‍‍	15	–	12	.556	31	–	22	.585
Northwestern ‍‍‍	15	–	13	.536	26	–	30	.464
Michigan State ‍‍‍	13	–	15	.464	25	–	26	.490
Purdue ‍‍‍	11	–	17	.393	34	–	25	.576
Wisconsin ‍‍‍	9	–	19	.321	22	–	37	.373
Indiana ‍‍‍	5	–	23	.179	34	–	26	.567
x – Division champion ‡ – Tournament champion y – Invited to the NCAA tournament As of June 30, 1989; Rankings from Collegiate Baseball

The 1989 Big Ten Conference baseball tournament was held at Ray Fisher Stadium on the campus of the University of Michigan in Minneapolis, Minnesota, from May 19 through 20. The top four teams from the regular season participated in the double-elimination tournament, the ninth annual tournament sponsored by the Big Ten Conference to determine the league champion. Illinois won their first tournament championship and earned the Big Ten Conference's automatic bid to the 1989 NCAA Division I baseball tournament. Illinois was the first team other than Michigan and Minnesota to win the event.

== Format and seeding ==
The 1989 tournament was a 4-team double-elimination tournament, with seeds determined by conference regular season winning percentage only. Iowa claimed the second seed by tiebreaker over Illinois

Team	W	L	PCT	GB	Seed
Michigan	21	6	.778	–	1
Iowa	17	11	.607	4.5	2
Illinois	17	11	.607	4.5	3
Ohio State	16	12	.571	5.5	4
Minnesota	15	12	.556	6	–
Northwestern	15	13	.536	6.5	–
Michigan State	13	15	.464	7.5	–
Purdue	11	17	.393	10.5	–
Wisconsin	9	19	.321	12.5	–
Indiana	5	23	.179	16.5	–

== Tournament ==
Upper round 1
1	Michigan	7
4	Ohio State	1
2	Iowa	7
3	Illinois	8
Lower round 1
4	Ohio State	4
2	Iowa	2

Upper final
1	Michigan	1
3	Illinois	7
Lower final
1	Michigan	6
4	Ohio State	0

Final
3	Illinois	2
1	Michigan	0

== All-Tournament Team ==
The following players were named to the All-Tournament Team.

Pos	Name	School
P	Rich Capparelli	Illinois
P	Russell Brock	Michigan
C	Mark Dalesandro	Illinois
1B	Tom Eiterman	Ohio State
2B	Wil Parsons	Illinois
SS	Bob Christensen	Illinois
OF	Don Cuchran	Illinois
OF	Sean Mulligan	Illinois
OF	Jim Durham	Michigan
DH	Kourtney Thompson	Michigan

=== Most Outstanding Player ===
Rich Capparelli was named Most Outstanding Player. Capparelli was a pitcher for Illinois.
