= 1989 Florida State Seminoles baseball team =

American college baseball season

1989 Florida State Seminoles baseball

NCAA Atlantic Regional champions Metro tournament champions

College World Series, 2–2
- Conference: Metro Conference (1975–1995)
- Record: 54–16 (14–4 Metro)
- Head coach: Mike Martin (10th year)
- Home stadium: Dick Howser Stadium

1989 Metro Conference baseball standings
	Conf.				Overall
Team	W		L	PCT	W		L	PCT
No. 3 Florida State ‍†‍‡‍^{y}	14	–	4	.778	54	–	18	.750
Virginia Tech ‍‍‍	12	–	6	.667	35	–	22	.614
Southern Miss ‍‍‍	8	–	7	.533	36	–	26	.581
South Carolina ‍‍‍	8	–	7	.533	34	–	23	.596
Memphis State ‍‍‍	8	–	10	.444	32	–	23	.582
Louisville ‍‍‍	6	–	11	.353	27	–	23	.540
Cincinnati ‍‍‍	3	–	14	.176	21	–	30	.412
† – Conference champion ‡ – Tournament champion y – Invited to the NCAA tournament As of June 30, 1989; Rankings from Collegiate Baseball

The 1989 Florida State Seminoles baseball team represented Florida State University in the 1989 NCAA Division I baseball season. The Seminoles played their home games at Dick Howser Stadium. The team was coached by Mike Martin in his tenth season as head coach at Florida State.

The Seminoles reached the College World Series, their tenth appearance in Omaha, where they finished tied for third place after recording an opening round win against North Carolina, a second round win against eventual champion Wichita State and a pair of semifinal losses to Wichita State.

== Personnel ==
=== Roster ===
1989 Florida State Seminoles roster
Pitchers: 4 - Clyde Keller - Senior; 14 - Matt Dunbar - Junior; 15 - Jerry Santos - Sophomore; 16 - Ricky Kimball - Sophomore; 18 - Mike Madonne - Sophomore; 20 - Tim Nedin - Junior; 27 - Mike Brady - Junior; 29 - David Sorokowski - Sophomore; 31 - Barry Johnson - Sophomore; 32 - Gar Finnvold - Junior; 39 - Gary Painter - Junior; 43 - Brad Gregory - Junior; 44 - Pat Underhill - Sophomore; 46 - Scott Steinitz - Junior	Catchers: 17 - Marc Ronan - Sophomore; 21 - Marc Dunbar - Freshman; 22 - Pedro Grifol - Freshman; 26 - Matt Clements - Senior; Infielders: 1 - Allen Bevis - Freshman; 2 - Bob Reboin - Junior; 5 - Buddy Cribb - Sophomore; 6 - Rob Bargas - Junior; 7 - John Marc Tamayo - Junior; 9 - Rocky Rau - Junior; 10 - Brian Gilliland - Junior; 12 - Garrett Blanton - Freshman; 19 - Brad Parker - Sophomore; 24 - Eduardo Perez - Freshman	Outfielders: - Leon Fowler - Freshman; 13 - Tom Manley - Junior; 23 - Dean Harrison - Sophomore; 25 - Mike Stubbs - Sophomore; 30 - Ty Mueller - Freshman; 35 - Keith Lyttle - Junior; 42 - Phil Dannunzio - Sophomore; 45 - Chris Brock - Freshman; 49 - Scott Edwards - Freshman

=== Coaches ===
1989 Florida State Seminoles baseball coaching staff
- Mike Martin - Head coach - 10th year

== Schedule and results ==
Legend
Florida State win
Florida State loss

1989 Florida State Seminoles baseball game log
Regular season

February
Date	Opponent	Site/stadium	Score	Overall record	Metro record
Feb 4	Arizona State*	Dick Howser Stadium • Tallahassee, FL	W 9–6	1–0	
Feb 5	Arizona State*	Dick Howser Stadium • Tallahassee, FL	W 8–3	2–0	
Feb 6	Georgia Tech*	Dick Howser Stadium • Tallahassee, FL	W 14–1	3–0	
Feb 10	Grambling State*	Dick Howser Stadium • Tallahassee, FL	W 8–3	4–0	
Feb 11	Grambling State*	Dick Howser Stadium • Tallahassee, FL	W 5–0	5–0	
Feb 12	Grambling State*	Dick Howser Stadium • Tallahassee, FL	W 8–2	6–0	
Feb 18	at Florida*	Alfred A. McKethan Stadium • Gainesville, FL	L 1–5	6–1	
Feb 19	at Florida*	Alfred A. McKethan Stadium • Gainesville, FL	L 5–6	6–2	
Feb 20	Charleston Southern*	Dick Howser Stadium • Tallahassee, FL	W 5–4^{10}	7–2	
Feb 22	Charleston Southern*	Dick Howser Stadium • Tallahassee, FL	W 10–2	8–2	
Feb 25	South Florida*	Dick Howser Stadium • Tallahassee, FL	L 0–10	8–3	
Feb 26	South Florida*	Dick Howser Stadium • Tallahassee, FL	W 8–7	9–3	
Feb 28	at South Florida*	Red McEwen Field • Tampa, FL	L 5–6	9–4	

March
Date	Opponent	Site/stadium	Score	Overall record	
Mar 1	at South Florida*	Red McEwen Field • Tampa, FL	L 3–14	9–5	
Mar 3	Rice*	Dick Howser Stadium • Tallahassee, FL	L 3–4	9–6	
Mar 4	Rice*	Dick Howser Stadium • Tallahassee, FL	W 6–0	10–6	
Mar 5	Rice*	Dick Howser Stadium • Tallahassee, FL	W 3–0	11–6	
Mar 7	Richmond*	Dick Howser Stadium • Tallahassee, FL	W 6–0	12–6	
Mar 8	Richmond*	Dick Howser Stadium • Tallahassee, FL	W 12–3	13–6	
Mar 9	Richmond*	Dick Howser Stadium • Tallahassee, FL	W 3–2^{13}	14–6	
Mar 10	Ball State*	Dick Howser Stadium • Tallahassee, FL	W 10–0	15–6	
Mar 11	Ball State*	Dick Howser Stadium • Tallahassee, FL	W 11–1	16–6	
Mar 12	Ball State*	Dick Howser Stadium • Tallahassee, FL	W 16–0	17–6	
Mar 14	Samford*	Dick Howser Stadium • Tallahassee, FL	W 18–2	18–6	
Mar 15	Samford*	Dick Howser Stadium • Tallahassee, FL	W 14–0	19–6	
Mar 17	at South Carolina	Sarge Frye Field • Columbia, SC	W 6–5	20–6	1–0
Mar 18	at South Carolina	Sarge Frye Field • Columbia, SC	L 3–4	20–7	1–1
Mar 19	at South Carolina	Sarge Frye Field • Columbia, SC	L 4–5	20–8	1–2
Mar 21	at Jacksonville*	Jacksonville, FL	W 11–6	21–8	
Mar 24	Cal State Fullerton*	Dick Howser Stadium • Tallahassee, FL	W 6–5^{11}	22–8	
Mar 25	Cal State Fullerton*	Dick Howser Stadium • Tallahassee, FL	L 4–9	22–9	
Mar 26	Cal State Fullerton*	Dick Howser Stadium • Tallahassee, FL	W 10–0	23–9	
Mar 28	Mercer*	Dick Howser Stadium • Tallahassee, FL	W 2–1	24–9	
Mar 29	Mercer*	Dick Howser Stadium • Tallahassee, FL	W 7–0	25–9	
Mar 31	Southern Miss	Dick Howser Stadium • Tallahassee, FL	W 10–2	26–9	2–2

April
Date	Opponent	Site/stadium	Score	Overall record	
Apr 1	Southern Miss	Dick Howser Stadium • Tallahassee, FL	W 6–2	27–9	3–2
Apr 2	Southern Miss	Dick Howser Stadium • Tallahassee, FL	W 7–2	28–9	4–2
Apr 4	Jacksonville*	Dick Howser Stadium • Tallahassee, FL	W 6–0	29–9	
Apr 5	Jacksonville*	Dick Howser Stadium • Tallahassee, FL	W 14–3	30–9	
Apr 7	Miami (FL)*	Dick Howser Stadium • Tallahassee, FL	W 3–0	31–9	
Apr 8	Miami (FL)*	Dick Howser Stadium • Tallahassee, FL	L 1–8	31–10	
Apr 9	Miami (FL)*	Dick Howser Stadium • Tallahassee, FL	W 11–3	32–10	
Apr 11	Florida*	Dick Howser Stadium • Tallahassee, FL	L 0–5	32–11	
Apr 12	Florida*	Dick Howser Stadium • Tallahassee, FL	W 7–5	33–11	
Apr 14	Louisville	Dick Howser Stadium • Tallahassee, FL	W 7–0	34–11	5–2
Apr 15	Louisville	Dick Howser Stadium • Tallahassee, FL	W 10–1	35–11	6–2
Apr 16	Louisville	Dick Howser Stadium • Tallahassee, FL	W 7–2	36–11	7–2
Apr 21	Virginia Tech	Dick Howser Stadium • Tallahassee, FL	L 5–7	36–12	7–3
Apr 22	Virginia Tech	Dick Howser Stadium • Tallahassee, FL	W 14–8	37–12	8–3
Apr 23	Virginia Tech	Dick Howser Stadium • Tallahassee, FL	W 8–4	38–12	9–3
Apr 29	at Memphis State	Nat Buring Stadium • Memphis, TN	W 6–2	39–12	10–3
Apr 29	at Memphis State	Nat Buring Stadium • Memphis, TN	W 6–2	40–12	11–3
Apr 30	at Memphis State	Nat Buring Stadium • Memphis, TN	W 3–1	41–12	12–3

May
Date	Opponent	Site/stadium	Score	Overall record	
May 2	at Jacksonville*	Jacksonville, FL	L 6–7^{10}	41–13	
May 5	at Miami (FL)*	Mark Light Field • Coral Gables, FL	L 2–11	41–14	
May 6	at Miami (FL)*	Mark Light Field • Coral Gables, FL	L 2–8	41–15	
May 7	at Miami (FL)*	Mark Light Field • Coral Gables, FL	W 8–4	42–15	
May 12	at Cincinnati	Meyers Field • Cincinnati, OH	L 0–2	42–16	12–4
May 13	at Cincinnati	Meyers Field • Cincinnati, OH	W 18–7	43–16	13–4
May 14	at Cincinnati	Meyers Field • Cincinnati, OH	W 8–7	44–16	14–4

Postseason

Metro Conference Tournament
Date	Opponent	Site/stadium	Score	Overall record	Tourn Record
May 18	Memphis State	Sarge Frye Field • Columbia, SC	W 9–4	45–16	1–0
May 19	Southern Miss	Sarge Frye Field • Columbia, SC	W 14–7	46–16	2–0
May 20	Virginia Tech	Sarge Frye Field • Columbia, SC	W 8–2	47–16	3–0
May 20	Southern Miss	Sarge Frye Field • Columbia, SC	W 6–5^{12}	48–16	4–0

NCAA Atlantic Regional
Date	Opponent	Site/stadium	Score	Overall record	NCAAT record
May 25	Rider	Dick Howser Stadium • Tallahassee, FL	W 13–7	49–16	1–0
May 26	South Florida	Dick Howser Stadium • Tallahassee, FL	W 8–1	50–16	2–0
May 27	Auburn	Dick Howser Stadium • Tallahassee, FL	W 7–6	51–16	3–0
May 28	Clemson	Dick Howser Stadium • Tallahassee, FL	W 8–1	52–16	4–0

College World Series
Date	Opponent	Seed	Site/stadium	Score	Overall record	CWS record
June 2	(8) North Carolina	(1)	Johnny Rosenblatt Stadium • Omaha, NE	W 4–2	53–16	1–0
June 5	(4) Wichita State	(1)	Johnny Rosenblatt Stadium • Omaha, NE	W 4–2	54–16	2–0
June 7	(4) Wichita State	(1)	Johnny Rosenblatt Stadium • Omaha, NE	'L 4–7	54–17	2–1
June 9	(4) Wichita State	(1)	Johnny Rosenblatt Stadium • Omaha, NE	'L 9–12	54–18	2–2
