= 1989 Wichita State Shockers baseball team =

American college baseball season

1989 Wichita State Shockers baseball

National champions Missouri Valley Conference champions
- Conference: Missouri Valley Conference
- CB: No. 1
- Record: 68-16 (13-5 MVC)
- Head coach: Gene Stephenson (12th year)
- Home stadium: Eck Stadium

1989 Missouri Valley Conference baseball standings
	Conf.				Overall
Team	W		L	PCT	W		L	PCT
No. 1 Wichita State ‍†‍‍^{y}	13	–	5	.722	68	–	18	.791
No. 22 Indiana State ‍‍‡‍^{y}	13	–	7	.650	48	–	21	.696
Illinois State ‍‍‍	10	–	10	.500	26	–	34	.433
Creighton ‍‍‍	9	–	11	.450	37	–	26	.587
Bradley ‍‍‍	7	–	11	.389	35	–	22	.614
Southern Illinois ‍‍‍	6	–	14	.300	26	–	38	.406
† – Conference champion ‡ – Tournament champion y – Invited to the NCAA tournament As of June 30, 1989; Rankings from Collegiate Baseball

The 1989 Wichita State Shockers baseball team represented Wichita State University in the 1989 NCAA Division I baseball season. The Shockers played their home games at Eck Stadium. The team was coached by Gene Stephenson in his 12th season at Wichita State.

The Shockers won the College World Series, defeating the Texas Longhorns in the championship game.

== Roster ==
1989 Wichita State Shockers roster
Pitchers: 16 Jeff Williams; 18 Charlie Giaudrone; 21 Greg Brummett; 25 Jeff Bluma; 26 Phil Mendelson; 28 Tyler Green; 29 Darrin Paxton; 30 Brian Buzard; 33 Pat Cedeno; 34 Jim Newlin; 35 Morgan LeClair	Infielders: 1 Pat Meares; 2 Mike Jones; 5 Mike Lansing; 9 P.J. Forbes; 11 Tommy Tilma; 13 Guy Goodman; 15 Bryant Winslow; 23 Mike Wentworth; 27 Paul Cheatum	Outfielders: 3 Jim Audley; 6 Mike McDonald; 7 Jay Haffley; 8 Jeff Bonacquista; 14 Joey Wilson; 19 Todd Dreifort; Catchers: 22 Eric Wedge

== Schedule ==
1989 Wichita State Shockers baseball game log
Regular season
February

Date	Opponent	Score	Overall record	MVC record
February 19	Arkansas	1-5	0-1	–
February 25	Kearney State	9-0	1-1	–
February 25	Kearney State	10-2	2-1	–
February 26	Kearney State	17-0	3-1	–

March

Date	Opponent	Score	Overall record	MVC record
March 3	TCU	16-2	4-1	–
March 8	Fort Hays State	11-10	5-1	–
March 8	Fort Hays State	11-0	6-1	–
March 9	Loyola Marymount	16-5	7-1	–
March 9	Loyola Marymount	28-0	8-1	–
March 11	at Oral Roberts	21-3	9-1	–
March 12	at Oral Roberts	11-2	10-1	–
March 13	at New Mexico	9-3	11-1	–
March 14	at New Mexico	21-4	12-1	–
March 15	vs. Colorado State	7-4	13-1	–
March 15	at New Mexico	20-2	14-1	–
March 16	vs. Colorado State	23-3	15-1	–
March 16	at New Mexico	28-2	16-1	–
March 18	Texas Tech	8-4	17-1	–
March 19	Georgia Tech	13-2	18-1	–
March 20	Georgia Tech	7-2	19-1	–
March 21	Texas Tech	16-4	20-1	–
March 21	Texas Tech	8-2	21-1	–
March 23	Northern Iowa	29-6	22-1	–
March 25	vs. Lewis & Clark	10-1	23-1	–
March 26	vs. Portland State	8-4	24-1	–
March 26	at Hawaii	2-7	24-2	–
March 27	vs. Hawaii-Hilo	6-1	25-2	–
March 28	vs. Fordham	11-1	26-2	–
March 29	vs. Hawaii-Hilo	5-3	27-2	–
March 29	at Hawaii	4-3	28-2	–
March 30	vs. Portland State	6-0	29-2	–
March 31	vs. Lewis & Clark	2-4	29-3	–

April

Date	Opponent	Score	Overall record	MVC record
April 1	vs. Fordham	8-4	30-3	–
April 4	Oral Roberts	4-1	31-3	–
April 5	Oral Roberts	10-9	32-3	–
April 8	Indiana State	13-3	33-3	1-0
April 8	Indiana State	1-3	33-4	1-1
April 9	Indiana State	4-11	33-5	1-2
April 10	Indiana State	7-1	34-5	2-2
April 11	Kansas Wesleyan	28-0	35-5	–
April 12	Nebraska	3-0	36-5	–
April 15	Illinois State	8-7	37-5	3-2
April 15	Illinois State	4-5	37-6	3-3
April 16	Illinois State	26-3	38-6	4-3
April 16	Illinois State	4-6	38-7	4-4
April 19	Oklahoma State	6-11	38-8	–
April 20	at Kansas	9-2	39-8	–
April 22	at Bradley	14-3	40-8	5-4
April 23	at Bradley	4-0	41-8	6-4
April 25	Kansas State	17-5	42-8	–
April 26	at Oklahoma State	12-4	43-8	–
April 27	Kansas	14-0	44-8	–
April 29	at Southern Illinois	12-4	45-8	7-4
April 29	at Southern Illinois	1-4	45-9	7-5
April 30	at Southern Illinois	5-2	46-9	8-5
April 30	at Southern Illinois	6-4	47-9	9-5

May

Date	Opponent	Score	Overall record	MVC record
May 2	at Nebraska	15-3	48-9	–
May 3	at Kansas	7-2	49-9	–
May 4	Kansas	6-9	49-10	–
May 6	Creighton	11-1	50-10	10-5
May 6	Creighton	9-2	51-10	11-5
May 7	Creighton	18-3	52-10	12-5
May 7	Creighton	4-3	53-10	13-5
May 10	Oklahoma Baptist	12-2	54-10	–
May 11	BYU	8-6	55-10	–
May 12	BYU	16-15	56-10	–
May 12	BYU	3-9	56-11	–
May 13	BYU	3-9	56-12	–

Post-season
Missouri Valley Conference Tournament

Date	Opponent	Score	Overall record
May 19	vs. Southern Illinois	16-3	57-12
May 19	vs. Indiana State	1-4	57-13
May 20	vs. Southern Illinois	5-3	58-13
May 20	vs. Indiana State	7-12	58-14

NCAA tournament: West II Regional

Date	Opponent	Score	Overall record
May 26	vs. Portland	4-0	59-14
May 27	vs. Pepperdine	12-1	60-14
May 28	vs. Michigan	5-14	60-15
May 28	vs. Fresno State	6-4	61-15
May 29	vs. Michigan	3-2	62-15
May 29	vs. Michigan	9-5	63-15

NCAA tournament: College World Series

Date	Opponent	Site/stadium	Score	Overall record
June 2	vs. Arkansas	Rosenblatt Stadium	3-1	64-15
June 4	vs. Florida State	Rosenblatt Stadium	2-4	64-16
June 6	vs. Arkansas	Rosenblatt Stadium	8-4	65-16
June 7	vs. Florida State	Rosenblatt Stadium	7-4	66-16
June 9	vs. Florida State	Rosenblatt Stadium	7-4	67-16
June 10	vs. Texas	Rosenblatt Stadium	5-3	68-16

== Awards and honors ==
Jim Audley

- College World Series All-Tournament Team
- All-MVC Second Team

Greg Brummett

- College World Series Most Outstanding Player
- All-America Second Team
- MVC Pitcher of the Year
- All-MVC First Team

Pat Cedeno

- All-MVC Second Team

Todd Dreifort

- College World Series All-Tournament Team

P.J. Forbes

- All-MVC Second Team

Mike Lansing

- All-America Second Team
- All-MVC First Team

Mike McDonald

- All-America Second Team
- All-MVC First Team

Pat Meares

- College World Series All-Tournament Team

Jim Newlin

- College World Series All-Tournament Team
- All-MVC Second Team

Darrin Paxton

- All-America Freshman Team

Eric Wedge

- College World Series All-Tournament Team
- All-America First Team
- MVC Player of the Year
- All-MVC First Team

Bryant Winslow

- All-MVC Second Team

== Shockers in the 1989 MLB draft ==
The following members of the Wichita State Shockers baseball program were drafted in the 1989 Major League Baseball draft.

Player	Position	Round	Overall	MLB Team
Eric Wedge	C	3rd	83rd	Boston Red Sox
Mike Lansing	SS	9th	219th	Baltimore Orioles
Greg Brummett	RHP	11th	284th	San Francisco Giants
Jim Newlin	RHP	12th	299th	Seattle Mariners
Mike McDonald	OF	29th	752nd	San Francisco Giants
Brian Morrow	OF	53rd	1317th	Seattle Mariners
