= Gene Stephenson =

American baseball coach (born 1945)

Biographical details
- Born: August 31, 1945 (age 81); Council Grove, Kansas, U.S.

Playing career
- 1965–1968: Missouri
- Position: First baseman

Coaching career (HC unless noted)
- 1969: Missouri (assistant)
- 1973–1977: Oklahoma (assistant)
- 1978–2013: Wichita State

Head coaching record
- Overall: 1837–675–3 (.731)

Accomplishments and honors

Championships
- College World Series (1989); 18× Missouri Valley Conference baseball tournament (1980, 1982, 1985, 1987, 1988, 1991–1993, 1998–2000, 2002–2005, 2008, 2009, 2013); 20× Missouri Valley Conference regular season (1985, 1987–2000, 2002, 2004, 2007, 2008, 2010)
- College Baseball Hall of Fame; Inducted in 2014

Gene Stephenson (born August 31, 1945) is an American former college baseball coach, who served as the head baseball coach at Wichita State from 1978 to 2013.

== Career ==
When he arrived at Wichita State, he inherited a program that had been dormant for over seven years. In his first year, despite not playing a home game until their 18th game, his Shockers finished with a winning record. In his third year, they made the first NCAA tournament appearance in school history, and in his fifth they advanced all the way to the title game. The team, with four first team All-Americans (seven overall), lost to Miami. This was all the more remarkable considering that until 1984, they played at a bare-bones stadium with only a tiny bleacher section for seating. The momentum from their 1982 title game appearance helped spearhead the building of a permanent facility, Eck Stadium, in 1985.

Under his leadership, the Shockers made seven College World Series and 26 NCAA tournament appearances, including 14 straight from 1987 to 2000. His teams never had a losing season. His 1982 team went 73–14, establishing an NCAA record for single-season wins. Stephenson won his first and only CWS championship in 1989; also in 1989, the Shockers won 24 consecutive games.

Prior to coaching at WSU, he served as an assistant coach at Oklahoma. During that tenure, the Sooners won five league championships, and went to five College World Series.

For most of the day on July 10, 2005, Stephenson was the head coach of Oklahoma. Several hours after accepting the job, however, Stephenson decided to remain at Wichita State, reportedly due to scholarship issues at Oklahoma.

After 36 years, Stephenson was fired on June 4, 2013.

== Personal life ==
Born in Council Grove, Kansas; Gene attended Guthrie High School, Guthrie, Oklahoma, then attended the University of Missouri with his first year on a football scholarship. He had better luck playing baseball, however; as a first baseman under legendary coach Hi Simmons, he was an All-American in 1967. Stephenson served a three-year stint in the United States Army, spending one year in Vietnam. Gene has two children, Jay and Ginny.

His younger brother is Phil Stephenson, who played under him from 1980 to 1983. Gene and Phil were inducted into the Guthrie High School Hall of Fame in 1994. Gene was a first team all-state honoree in football and baseball in his senior year.

== Head coaching record ==
The following is a table of Stephenson's yearly records as an NCAA head baseball coach.

Record table
Season	Team	Overall	Conference	Standing	Postseason
Wichita State Shockers (Missouri Valley Conference) (1978–2013)
1978	Wichita State	43–30–1			
1979	Wichita State	65–15	10–2		
1980	Wichita State	53–12–1	7–1		NCAA Regional
1981	Wichita State	56–15	15–1	1st (West)	NCAA Regional
1982	Wichita State	73–14	15–1	1st (West)	College World Series Runner-up
1983	Wichita State	55–18	7–1	1st (West)	NCAA Regional
1984	Wichita State	40–22	7–7	4th	
1985	Wichita State	68–20	15–5	1st	NCAA Regional
1986	Wichita State	45–18	12–8	2nd	
1987	Wichita State	59–20	13–7	1st	NCAA Regional
1988	Wichita State	56–16–1	16–4	1st	College World Series
1989	Wichita State	68–15	13–5	1st	College World Series champions
1990	Wichita State	45–19	14–6	T–1st	NCAA Regional
1991	Wichita State	66–13	21–3	1st	College World Series Runner-up
1992	Wichita State	56–11	18–3	1st	College World Series
1993	Wichita State	58–17	17–3	1st	College World Series Runner-up
1994	Wichita State	45–17	19–2	1st	NCAA Regional
1995	Wichita State	53–17	24–8	1st	NCAA Regional
1996	Wichita State	54–11	24–4	1st	College World Series
1997	Wichita State	51–18	21–7	1st	NCAA Regional
1998	Wichita State	56–7	26–1	1st	NCAA Regional
1999	Wichita State	59–14	24–7	1st	NCAA Regional
2000	Wichita State	44–21	24–8	1st	NCAA Regional
2001	Wichita State	42–24	21–11	2nd	
2002	Wichita State	47–17	23–9	1st	NCAA Regional
2003	Wichita State	49–27	19–13	2nd	NCAA Regional
2004	Wichita State	49–16	28–4	1st	NCAA Regional
2005	Wichita State	51–24	16–8	2nd	NCAA Regional
2006	Wichita State	46–22	15–9	3rd	NCAA Regional
2007	Wichita State	53–22	20–4	1st	NCAA Super Regional
2008	Wichita State	48–17	19–5	1st	NCAA Super Regional
2009	Wichita State	30–27	11–7	3rd	NCAA Regional
2010	Wichita State	41–19	15–6	t-1st	
2011	Wichita State	39–26	14–7	2nd	
2012	Wichita State	35–25	12–9	3rd	
2013	Wichita State	39–28	15–6	2nd	NCAA Regional
Wichita State:		1837–675–3 (.731)	590–192 (.754) (Note: Incomplete (records unavailable for 1978))		
Total:		1837–675–3 (.731)			
National champion Postseason invitational champion Conference regular season champion Conference regular season and conference tournament champion Division regular season champion Division regular season and conference tournament champion Conference tournament champion

== See also ==
- List of college baseball career coaching wins leaders
- Kansas Sports Hall of Fame
