= 1989 Arkansas Razorbacks baseball team =

American college baseball season

1989 Arkansas Razorbacks baseball

NCAA Northeast Regional champion SWC regular season co-champion

College World Series, 5th (tie)
- Conference: Southwest Conference
- Record: 51–16 (17–4 SWC)
- Head coach: Norm DeBriyn (20th season)
- Home stadium: George Cole Field

1989 Southwest Conference baseball standings
	Conf.				Overall
Team	W		L	PCT	W		L	PCT
No. 9 Texas A&M ‍†‍‡‍^{y}	17	–	4	.810	58	–	7	.892
No. 5 Arkansas ‍†‍‍^{y}	17	–	4	.810	51	–	16	.761
No. 2 Texas ‍‍‍^{y}	14	–	7	.667	54	–	18	.750
Houston ‍‍‍	9	–	12	.429	43	–	17	.717
Texas Tech ‍‍‍	9	–	12	.429	32	–	22	.593
TCU ‍‍‍	7	–	14	.333	37	–	22	.627
Baylor ‍‍‍	7	–	14	.333	32	–	19	.627
Rice ‍‍‍	4	–	17	.190	28	–	30	.483
† – Conference champion ‡ – Tournament champion y – Invited to the NCAA tournament As of June 30, 1989; Rankings from Collegiate Baseball

The 1989 Arkansas Razorbacks baseball team represented the University of Arkansas in the 1989 NCAA Division I baseball season. The Razorbacks were coached by Norm DeBriyn, in his 20th season with the Razorbacks, and played their home games at George Cole Field.

== Schedule and results ==
Legend
	Arkansas win
	Arkansas loss
	Postponement
**Bold**	Arkansas team member

2004 Arkansas Razorbacks baseball game log
Regular season

February (6–0)
Date	Opponent	Rank	Site/stadium	Score	Overall record	SWC record
February 19	Wichita State*		George Cole Field; Fayetteville, Arkansas	**W** 5–1	1–0	
February 24	Missouri Southern*		George Cole Field	**W** 6–2	2–0	
February 25	Kansas*		George Cole Field	**W** 3–2	3–0	
February 25	Kansas*		George Cole Field	**W** 7–0	4–0	
February 26	Kansas*		George Cole Field	**W** 18–4	5–0	
February 28	vs. Kentucky*		Joker Marchant Stadium; Lakeland, Florida	**W** 8–4	6–0	

March (19–4)
Date	Opponent	Rank	Site/stadium	Score	Overall record	SWC record
March 1	vs. Penn State*		Joker Marchant Stadium	**W** 2–1	7–0	
March 1	vs. Kentucky*		Joker Marchant Stadium	**L** 2–6	7–1	
March 2	vs. Western Michigan*		Joker Marchant Stadium	**L** 2–6	7–2	
March 3	vs. Eckerd*		Joker Marchant Stadium	**W** 8–2	8–2	
March 4	vs. Western Michigan*		Joker Marchant Stadium	**W** 15–0	9–2	
March 10	Iowa State*		George Cole Field	**W** 1–0	10–2	
March 11	Iowa State*		George Cole Field	**W** 9–4	11–2	
March 12	Nebraska*		George Cole Field	**W** 4–1	12–2	
March 13	Stephen F. Austin*		George Cole Field	**W** 9–1	13–2	
March 14	Wisconsin–Oshkosh*		George Cole Field	**W** 13–4	14–2	
March 15	Wisconsin–Oshkosh*		George Cole Field	**W** 9–4	15–2	
March 17	vs. Northwestern State*		Fair Grounds Field; Shreveport, Louisiana	**W** 3–2	16–2	
March 18	vs. Oklahoma State*		Fair Grounds Field	**L** 2–10	16–3	
March 19	vs. Louisiana–Lafayette*		Fair Grounds Field	**L** 4–8	16–4	
March 20	Northern Iowa*		George Cole Field	**W** 14–4	17–4	
March 21	Southwest Baptist*		George Cole Field	**W** 12–1	18–4	
March 22	School of the Ozarks*		George Cole Field	**W** 14–5	19–4	
March 22	School of the Ozarks*		George Cole Field	**W** 10–0	20–4	
March 24	Houston		George Cole Field	**W** 10–1	21–4	1–0
March 25	Houston		George Cole Field	**W** 3–0	22–4	2–0
March 25	Houston		George Cole Field	**W** 8–3	23–4	3–0
March 27	St. Olaf*		George Cole Field	**W** 11–3	24–4	
March 31	at Texas Tech		Dan Law Field; Lubbock, Texas	**W** 12–0	25–4	4–0

April (18–4)
Date	Opponent	Rank	Site/stadium	Score	Overall record	SWC record
April 1	at Texas Tech		Dan Law Field	**W** 3–2	26–4	5–0
April 1	at Texas Tech		Dan Law Field	**W** 6–5	27–4	6–0
April 4	at Oklahoma State*		Allie P. Reynolds Stadium; Stillwater, Oklahoma	**W** 10–4	28–4	
April 5	Evangel*		George Cole Field	**W** 6–4	29–4	
April 7	at TCU		TCU Diamond; Fort Worth, Texas	**W** 5–4	30–4	7–0
April 8	at TCU		TCU Diamond	**W** 8–6	31–4	8–0
April 8	at TCU		TCU Diamond	**W** 11–3	32–4	9–0
April 9	Southeastern Oklahoma State*		George Cole Field	**W** 11–1	33–4	
April 10	Dallas Baptist*		George Cole Field	**L** 8–10	33–5	
April 11	at Missouri*		Simmons Field; Columbia, Missouri	**W** 7–4	34–5	
April 14	Baylor		George Cole Field	**W** 8–4	35–5	10–0
April 15	Baylor		George Cole Field	**W** 9–1	36–5	11–0
April 15	Baylor		George Cole Field	**W** 10–3	37–5	12–0
April 19	Northeastern State*		George Cole Field	**W** 9–8	38–5	
April 21	at Rice		Cameron Field; Houston, Texas	**W** 10–2	39–5	13–0
April 22	at Rice		Cameron Field	**L** 1–3	39–6	13–1
April 22	at Rice		Cameron Field	**W** 8–4	40–6	14–1
April 26	Oklahoma*		George Cole Field	**L** 2–3	40–7	
April 28	Texas		George Cole Field	**L** 4–5	40–8	14–2
April 29	Texas		George Cole Field	**W** 8–4	41–8	15–2
April 29	Texas		George Cole Field	**W** 14–7	42–8	16–2
April 30	Kansas State*		George Cole Field	**W** 9–4	43–8	

May (2–3)
Date	Opponent	Rank	Site/stadium	Score	Overall record	SWC record
May 1	Kansas State*		George Cole Field	**L** 2–7	43–9	
May 5	at Texas A&M		Olsen Field; College Station, Texas	**W** 11–9 (16)	44–9	17–2
May 6	at Texas A&M		Olsen Field	**L** 2–3	44–10	17–3
May 7	at Texas A&M		Olsen Field	**L** 0–9	44–11	17–4
May 10	Oklahoma State*		George Cole Field	**W** 10–6	45–11	

Postseason

SWC Tournament (1–2)
Date	Opponent	Seed	Site/stadium	Score	Overall record	SWCT Record
May 18	vs. (3) Texas	(2)	Olsen Field	**L** 3–8	45–12	0–1
May 19	vs. (4) Houston	(2)	Olsen Field	**W** 5–4	46–12	1–1
May 20	vs. (3) Texas	(2)	Olsen Field	**L** 1–9	46–13	1–2

Northeast Regional (4–1)
Date	Opponent	Seed	Site/stadium	Score	Overall record	NCAAT record
May 25	vs. (6) Le Moyne*	(1)	Municipal Stadium; Waterbury, Connecticut	**L** 5–7	46–14	0–1
May 26	vs. (5) George Washington*	(1)	Municipal Stadium	**W** 8–2	47–14	1–1
May 28	vs. (3) Illinois*	(1)	Municipal Stadium	**W** 9–2	48–14	2–1
May 29	vs. (2) Arizona State*	(1)	Municipal Stadium	**W** 1–0	49–14	3–1
May 29	vs. (6) Le Moyne*	(1)	Municipal Stadium	**W** 6–5	50–14	4–1

College World Series (1–2)
Date	Opponent	Seed	Site/stadium	Score	Overall record	CWS record
June 2	vs. (4) Wichita State*	(5)	Johnny Rosenblatt Stadium; Omaha, Nebraska	**L** 1–3	50–15	0–1
June 4	vs. (8) North Carolina*	(5)	Johnny Rosenblatt Stadium	**W** 7–3	51–15	1–1
June 6	vs. (4) Wichita State*	(5)	Johnny Rosenblatt Stadium	**L** 4–8	51–16	1–2

*Denotes non–conference game • Schedule source

== Razorbacks in the 1989 MLB draft ==
The following members of the Arkansas Razorbacks baseball program were drafted in the 1989 Major League Baseball draft.

Player	Position	Round	Overall	MLB Team
Cole Hyson	P	9th	224th	Houston Astros
Mike Oquist	P	13th	321st	Baltimore Orioles
Troy Eklund	OF	25th	637th	Texas Rangers
Dennis Fletcher	P	28th	716th	St. Louis Cardinals
Greg D'Alexander	3B/C	31st	789th	Baltimore Orioles
Scott Pose	OF	34th	885th	Cincinnati Reds
Rod Stilwell	SS	60th	1417th	Kansas City Royals
