= 1989 Arizona Wildcats baseball team =

American college baseball season

1989 Arizona Wildcats baseball

West I Regional

Pacific-10 Southern Regular Season Champions
- Conference: Pacific-10 Conference
- Record: 45–18–1 (23–7 Pac-10)
- Head coach: Jerry Kindall (17th season)
- Assistant coaches: Jerry Stitt (11th season); Jim Wing (17th season)
- Home stadium: Sancet Stadium

1989 Pacific-10 Conference baseball standings
	Conf.				Overall
Team	W		L	PCT	W		L	PCT
Northern
Washington State ^{x}‍‍‍	16	–	8	.667	37	–	20	.649
Gonzaga ‍‍‍	15	–	9	.625	27	–	19	.587
Oregon State ‍‍‍	15	–	9	.625	27	–	23	.540
Portland ‍‍‍	12	–	12	.500	32	–	24	.571
Portland State ‍‍‍	11	–	13	.458	37	–	28	.569
Washington ‍‍‍	9	–	15	.375	13	–	20	.394
Eastern Washington ‍‍‍	6	–	18	.250	24	–	29	.453
Southern
No. 11 Arizona ^{x}‍‍‍^{y}	23	–	7	.767	45	–	18	.714
No. 17 Arizona State ‍‍‍^{y}	19	–	11	.633	42	–	19	.689
No. 26 Southern California ‍‍‍^{y}	16	–	14	.533	41	–	25	.621
Stanford ‍‍‍	12	–	18	.400	30	–	28	.517
California ‍‍‍	10	–	20	.333	35	–	24	.593
UCLA ‍‍‍	10	–	20	.333	27	–	33	.450
x – Division champion y – Invited to the NCAA tournament As of June 30, 1989; Rankings from Collegiate Baseball

The 1989 Arizona Wildcats baseball team represented the University of Arizona during the 1989 NCAA Division I baseball season. The Wildcats played their home games at Frank Sancet Stadium. The team was coached by Jerry Kindall in his 17th season at Arizona. The Wildcats finished 45-18-1 overall and placed 1st in the Pacific-10's Southern Division with an 23–7 record. This was the program's 1st regular season conference championship since 1980, and their 1st ever outright conference championship since joining the Pacific-10 Conference. After a single year absence, Arizona returned to the postseason and was selected to host the West I Regional at Sancet Stadium. The Wildcats won their 1st pair of games against Eastern Kentucky and Hawaii before falling to Long Beach State in their 3rd game. The team bounced back to avoid elimination against Loyola Marymount but ultimately lost the next game to Long Beach State to end their season. The team was also noteworthy for featuring 6 future Major League Baseball players.

== Previous season ==
The Wildcats finished the 1988 season with a record of 33-26 and 10–20 in conference play, finishing 6th in the "Six-Pac" (Pac-10 Southern). Arizona would miss the postseason for the 1st time since 1984.

== Personnel ==
=== Roster ===
1989 Arizona Wildcats baseball roster
• David Blake • Randy Bongard • Todd Devereaux • Lance Dickson • Scott Erickson • Matt Figueroa	• Greg Fowble • Mike Gambino • Mike Ortiz • Jason Hisey • Trevor Hoffman • Jack Johnson	• Kevin Long • Damon Mashore • J.J. Northam • Jim Richardson • J.T. Snow • Alan Zinter

=== Coaches ===
1989 Arizona Wildcats baseball coaching staff
- Jerry Kindall - Head coach
- Jerry Stitt - Assistant coach
- Jim Wing - Assistant coach

== 1989 Schedule and results ==
1989 Arizona Wildcats baseball game log
Regular season
Date	Opponent	Site/Stadium	Score	Overall Record	Pac-10 Record
Jan 28	New Mexico State	Sancet Stadium • Tucson, AZ	W 14–4	1-0-0	
Jan 29	New Mexico State	Sancet Stadium • Tucson, AZ	W 10–3	2-0-0	
Jan 30	New Mexico State	Sancet Stadium • Tucson, AZ	W 8–0	3-0-0	
Feb 2	Nevada	Sancet Stadium • Tucson, AZ	W 5–2	4-0-0	
Feb 3	Nevada	Sancet Stadium • Tucson, AZ	W 6–3	5-0-0	
Feb 4	Nevada	Sancet Stadium • Tucson, AZ	W 6–4	6-0-0	
Feb 6	Cal State Dominguez Hills	Sancet Stadium • Tucson, AZ	L 4–12	6-1-0	
Feb 7	Cal State Dominguez Hills	Sancet Stadium • Tucson, AZ	W 18–4	7-1-0	
Feb 9	Utah	Sancet Stadium • Tucson, AZ	W 11–3	8-1-0	
Feb 10	Utah	Sancet Stadium • Tucson, AZ	W 10–2	9-1-0	
Feb 11	Utah	Sancet Stadium • Tucson, AZ	W 14–5	10-1-0	
Feb 13	United States International	Sancet Stadium • Tucson, AZ	W 18–0	11-1-0	
Feb 14	United States International	Sancet Stadium • Tucson, AZ	W 6–2	12-1-0	
Feb 16	at Cal State Fullerton	Titan Field • Fullerton, CA	L 3–7	12-2-0	
Feb 17	at Cal State Fullerton	Titan Field • Fullerton, CA	W 7–6	13-2-0	
Feb 18	at Cal State Fullerton	Titan Field • Fullerton, CA	L 5–7	13-3-0	
Feb 20	Long Beach State	Sancet Stadium • Tucson, AZ	L 6–8	13-4-0	
Feb 21	Long Beach State	Sancet Stadium • Tucson, AZ	L 7–14	13-5-0	
Feb 24	at USC	Dedeaux Field • Los Angeles, CA	W 10–6	14-5-0	1-0
Feb 25	at USC	Dedeaux Field • Los Angeles, CA	W 7–6	15-5-0	2-0
Feb 26	at USC	Dedeaux Field • Los Angeles, CA	L 5–7	15-6-0	2-1
Mar 3	at UCLA	Jackie Robinson Stadium • Los Angeles, CA	W 11–1	16-6-0	3-1
Mar 4	at UCLA	Jackie Robinson Stadium • Los Angeles, CA	W 6–3	17-6-0	4-1
Mar 5	at UCLA	Jackie Robinson Stadium • Los Angeles, CA	W 10–4	18-6-0	5-1
Mar 10	Stanford	Sancet Stadium • Tucson, AZ	W 17–3	19-6-0	6-1
Mar 11	Stanford	Sancet Stadium • Tucson, AZ	W 13–7	20-6-0	7-1
Mar 12	Stanford	Sancet Stadium • Tucson, AZ	L 4–5	20-7-0	7-2
Mar 14	UNLV	Sancet Stadium • Tucson, AZ	W 7–5	21-7-0	
Mar 15	UNLV	Sancet Stadium • Tucson, AZ	L 8–9	21-8-0	
Mar 17	at California	Evans Diamond • Berkeley, CA	W 2–1	22-8-0	8-2
Mar 18	at California	Evans Diamond • Berkeley, CA	W 12–8	23-8-0	9-2
Mar 19	at California	Evans Diamond • Berkeley, CA	L 1–2	23-9-0	9-3
Mar 23	Arizona State	Sancet Stadium • Tucson, AZ	W 5–3	24-9-0	10-3
Mar 24	Arizona State	Sancet Stadium • Tucson, AZ	L 2–3	24-10-0	10-4
Mar 25	Arizona State	Sancet Stadium • Tucson, AZ	L 6–16	24-11-0	10-5
Mar 31	vs Georgia Tech	Hubert H. Humphrey Metrodome • Minneapolis, MN	W 3–1	25-11-0	
Mar 31	vs Oklahoma State	Hubert H. Humphrey Metrodome • Minneapolis, MN	L 3–6	25-12-0	
Apr 1	at Minnesota	Hubert H. Humphrey Metrodome • Minneapolis, MN	T 5-5	25-12-1	
Apr 2	vs Georgia Tech	Hubert H. Humphrey Metrodome • Minneapolis, MN	W 12–4	26-12-1	
Apr 7	UCLA	Sancet Stadium • Tucson, AZ	W 6–1	27-12-1	11-5
Apr 8	UCLA	Sancet Stadium • Tucson, AZ	W 6–5	28-12-1	12-5
Apr 9	UCLA	Sancet Stadium • Tucson, AZ	W 7–1	29-12-1	13-5
Apr 11	Grand Canyon	Sancet Stadium • Tucson, AZ	W 4–1	30-12-1	
Apr 14	California	Sancet Stadium • Tucson, AZ	W 20–3	31-12-1	14-5
Apr 15	California	Sancet Stadium • Tucson, AZ	W 7–3	32-12-1	15-5
Apr 16	California	Sancet Stadium • Tucson, AZ	W 16–6	33-12-1	16-5
Apr 21	USC	Sancet Stadium • Tucson, AZ	W 11–4	34-12-1	17-5
Apr 22	USC	Sancet Stadium • Tucson, AZ	W 14–6	35-12-1	18-5
Apr 23	USC	Sancet Stadium • Tucson, AZ	W 6–4	36-12-1	19-5
Apr 28	at Stanford	Sunken Diamond • Palo Alto, CA	W 6–5	37-12-1	20-5
Apr 29	at Stanford	Sunken Diamond • Palo Alto, CA	L 3–11	37-13-1	20-6
Apr 30	at Stanford	Sunken Diamond • Palo Alto, CA	L 5–12	37-14-1	20-7
May 6	Grand Canyon	Sancet Stadium • Tucson, AZ	W 4–3	38-14-1	
May 12	at Arizona State	Packard Stadium • Tempe, AZ	W 10–6	39-14-1	21-7
May 13	at Arizona State	Packard Stadium • Tempe, AZ	W 9–4	40-14-1	22-7
May 14	at Arizona State	Packard Stadium • Tempe, AZ	W 10–0	41-14-1	23-7
May 19	vs Clemson	Boshamer Stadium • Chapel Hill, NC	W 8–6	42-14-1	
May 20	at North Carolina	Boshamer Stadium • Chapel Hill, NC	L 3–5	42-15-1	
May 21	vs Miami	Boshamer Stadium • Chapel Hill, NC	L 1–11	42-16-1	
NCAA West I Regional
May 26	(6) Eastern Kentucky	Sancet Stadium • Tucson, AZ	W 12–6	43-16-1	
May 27	(4) Hawaii	Sancet Stadium • Tucson, AZ	W 17–3	44-16-1	
May 28	(3) Long Beach State	Sancet Stadium • Tucson, AZ	L 6–10	44-17-1	
May 28	(5) Loyola Marymount	Sancet Stadium • Tucson, AZ	W 13–4	45-17-1	
May 29	(3) Long Beach State	Sancet Stadium • Tucson, AZ	L 3–10	45-18-1	

=== West I Regional ===
West I Regional Teams
(1) Arizona Wildcats	(6) Eastern Kentucky Colonels	(2) Oklahoma Sooners	(5) Loyola Marymount Lions	(3) Long Beach State Dirtbags	(4) Hawaii Rainbow Warriors

at Tucson, AZ

First round
1	Arizona	12
6	Eastern Kentucky	6
2	Oklahoma	5
5	Loyola Marymount	2
3	Long Beach State	14
4	Hawaii	7

Second round
Arizona	17
Hawaii	3
Oklahoma	4
Long Beach State	11
Eastern Kentucky	3
Loyola Marymount	9

Third round
Arizona	6
Long Beach State	10
Oklahoma	5*
Loyola Marymount	6*

Semifinals
Arizona	13
Loyola Marymount	4

Final
Long Beach State	10	–
Arizona	3	–

== 1989 MLB draft ==
Player	Position	Round	Overall	MLB team
Alan Zinter	C	1	24	New York Mets
Troy Bradford	RHP	4	106	Toronto Blue Jays
Scott Erickson	RHP	4	112	Minnesota Twins
J.T. Snow	INF	5	129	New York Yankees
Trevor Hoffman	INF	11	290	Cincinnati Reds
Kevin Long	OF	31	803	Kansas City Royals
Todd Devereaux	OF	33	857	New York Yankees
