= 1989 Texas Longhorns baseball team =

American college baseball season

1989 Texas Longhorns baseball

College World Series, runner-up
- Conference: Southwest Conference
- CB: No. 2
- Record: 54-18 (14-7 SWC)
- Head coach: Cliff Gustafson (22nd year)
- Home stadium: Disch–Falk Field

1989 Southwest Conference baseball standings
	Conf.				Overall
Team	W		L	PCT	W		L	PCT
No. 9 Texas A&M ‍†‍‡‍^{y}	17	–	4	.810	58	–	7	.892
No. 5 Arkansas ‍†‍‍^{y}	17	–	4	.810	51	–	16	.761
No. 2 Texas ‍‍‍^{y}	14	–	7	.667	54	–	18	.750
Houston ‍‍‍	9	–	12	.429	43	–	17	.717
Texas Tech ‍‍‍	9	–	12	.429	32	–	22	.593
TCU ‍‍‍	7	–	14	.333	37	–	22	.627
Baylor ‍‍‍	7	–	14	.333	32	–	19	.627
Rice ‍‍‍	4	–	17	.190	28	–	30	.483
† – Conference champion ‡ – Tournament champion y – Invited to the NCAA tournament As of June 30, 1989; Rankings from Collegiate Baseball

The 1989 Texas Longhorns baseball team represented the University of Texas at Austin in the 1989 NCAA Division I baseball season. The Longhorns played their home games at Disch–Falk Field. The team was coached by Cliff Gustafson in his 22nd season at Texas.

The Longhorns reached the College World Series final, but were eliminated by Wichita State.

== Personnel ==
=== Roster ===
1989 Texas Longhorns roster
Pitchers: 10 – Kirk Dressendorfer; 11 – Brian Dare; 21 – Freddie Aponte; 25 – Scott Bryant; 31 – Chris Gaskill; 13 - Curry Harden; Catchers: 12 – Jon Prather; 36 – Eddie Toledo; 42 – John Purvis	Infielders: 1 – Steve Bethea; 3 – David Lowery; 6 – Craig Newkirk; 8 – David Tollison; Outfielders: 2 – Jeff Shults; 4 – Lance Jones; 34 – Arthur Butcher	Unknown: 9 – Clay King; 15 – Kevin Pate; 16 – Todd Hotz; 20 – Doug Pettit; 22 – Rodney Pedraza; 23 – Mark Smith; 27 – Nick DeVincentis; 32 – Shannon Dorsey

=== Coaches ===
1989 Texas Longhorns baseball coaching staff
- Cliff Gustafson – Head coach – 22nd year
- Bill Bethea – Assistant coach – 20th year
- Clint Thomas – Assistant coach – 10th year
- Deron Gustafson – Assistant coach – 6th year

== Schedule ==
1989 Texas Longhorns baseball game log
Regular season
February

Date	Opponent	Site/stadium	Score	Overall record	SWC Record
February 8	St. Mary's (TX)	Disch–Falk Field • Austin, TX	W 5–2	1–0	
February 8	St. Mary's (TX)	Disch–Falk Field • Austin, TX	W 4–1	2–0	
February 10	UCLA	Disch–Falk Field • Austin, TX	W 4–3^{13}	3–0	
February 11	UCLA	Disch–Falk Field • Austin, TX	W 6–3	4–0	
February 12	UCLA	Disch–Falk Field • Austin, TX	W 14–4^{8}	5–0	
February 14	Texas Lutheran	Disch–Falk Field • Austin, TX	W 8–1	6–0	
February 14	Texas Lutheran	Disch–Falk Field • Austin, TX	L 11–12	6–1	
February 17	at Arizona State	Packard Stadium • Tempe, AZ	W 10–3	7–1	
February 18	at Arizona State	Packard Stadium • Tempe, AZ	W 4–1	8–1	
February 19	at Arizona State	Packard Stadium • Tempe, AZ	L 4–8	8–2	
February 21	Texas–Arlington	Disch–Falk Field • Austin, TX	L 0–2	8–3	
February 21	Texas–Arlington	Disch–Falk Field • Austin, TX	W 18–10	9–3	
February 24	Notre Dame	Disch–Falk Field • Austin, TX	L 9–12	9–4	
February 25	Miami (FL)	Disch–Falk Field • Austin, TX	L 5–9	9–5	
February 26	Miami (FL)	Disch–Falk Field • Austin, TX	W 5–2	10–5	
February 27	Miami (FL)	Disch–Falk Field • Austin, TX	W 6–2	11–5	

March

Date	Opponent	Site/stadium	Score	Overall record	SWC Record
March 1	Hardin–Simmons	Disch–Falk Field • Austin, TX	W 16–2	12–5	
March 3	Maine	Disch–Falk Field • Austin, TX	W 22–11	13–5	
March 7	Southwestern	Disch–Falk Field • Austin, TX	W 22–5	14–5	
March 8	Southwest Texas State	Disch–Falk Field • Austin, TX	W 21–8	15–5	
March 10	Oklahoma	Disch–Falk Field • Austin, TX	W 6–5^{12}	16–5	
March 11	Oklahoma	Disch–Falk Field • Austin, TX	W 13–9	17–5	
March 12	Emporia State	Disch–Falk Field • Austin, TX	W 17–6	18–5	
March 12	Emporia State	Disch–Falk Field • Austin, TX	W 16–4	19–5	
March 13	Emporia State	Disch–Falk Field • Austin, TX	W 14–3	20–5	
March 14	Southwestern	Disch–Falk Field • Austin, TX	W 20–12	21–5	
March 15	Southwest	Disch–Falk Field • Austin, TX	W 8–1	22–5	
March 16	Southwest	Disch–Falk Field • Austin, TX	W 17–4	23–5	
March 17	Dallas Baptist	Disch–Falk Field • Austin, TX	W 6–2	24–5	
March 17	Dallas Baptist	Disch–Falk Field • Austin, TX	W 14–6	25–5	
March 18	Dallas Baptist	Disch–Falk Field • Austin, TX	L 7–15	25–6	
March 18	Dallas Baptist	Disch–Falk Field • Austin, TX	W 7–2	26–6	
March 19	Sul Ross State	Disch–Falk Field • Austin, TX	W 3–0	27–6	
March 20	Lubbock Christian	Disch–Falk Field • Austin, TX	L 9–10	27–7	
March 22	Lubbock Christian	Disch–Falk Field • Austin, TX	W 9–0	28–7	
March 24	at Baylor	Ferrell Field • Waco, TX	W 5–4^{10}	29–7	1–0
March 25	at Baylor	Ferrell Field • Waco, TX	L 0–6	29–8	1–1
March 25	at Baylor	Ferrell Field • Waco, TX	W 6–3	30–8	2–1
March 28	Nebraska	Disch–Falk Field • Austin, TX	W 2–0	31–8	
March 28	Nebraska	Disch–Falk Field • Austin, TX	L 5–8	31–9	
March 31	Rice	Disch–Falk Field • Austin, TX	W 6–0	32–9	3–1

April

Date	Opponent	Site/stadium	Score	Overall record	SWC Record
April 1	Rice	Disch–Falk Field • Austin, TX	L 0–4	32–10	3–2
April 1	Rice	Disch–Falk Field • Austin, TX	W 5–4	33–10	4–2
April 7	Texas Tech	Disch–Falk Field • Austin, TX	W 8–2	34–10	5–2
April 8	Texas Tech	Disch–Falk Field • Austin, TX	W 13–3	35–10	6–2
April 8	Texas Tech	Disch–Falk Field • Austin, TX	W 4–1	36–10	7–2
April 15	at Texas A&M	Olsen Field • College Station, TX	W 6–2	37–10	8–2
April 16	at Texas A&M	Olsen Field • College Station, TX	L 14–18	37–11	8–3
April 16	at Texas A&M	Olsen Field • College Station, TX	L 5–8	37–12	8–4
April 17	at Oklahoma	L. Dale Mitchell Baseball Park • Norman, OK	W 10–9	38–12	
April 18	at Oklahoma	L. Dale Mitchell Baseball Park • Norman, OK	W 9–5	39–12	
April 21	Houston	Disch–Falk Field • Austin, TX	W 5–2	40–12	9–4
April 22	Houston	Disch–Falk Field • Austin, TX	W 9–3	41–12	10–4
April 22	Houston	Disch–Falk Field • Austin, TX	W 10–8	42–12	11–4
April 28	at Arkansas	George Cole Field • Fayetteville, AR	W 5–4	43–12	12–4
April 29	at Arkansas	George Cole Field • Fayetteville, AR	L 4–8	43–13	12–5
April 29	at Arkansas	George Cole Field • Fayetteville, AR	L 7–14	43–14	12–6

May

Date	Opponent	Site/stadium	Score	Overall record	SWC Record
May 5	TCU	Disch–Falk Field • Austin, TX	L 1–5	43–15	12–7
May 6	TCU	Disch–Falk Field • Austin, TX	W 10–2	44–15	13–7
May 6	TCU	Disch–Falk Field • Austin, TX	W 10–1	45–15	14–7

Postseason
SWC Tournament

Date	Opponent	Site/stadium	Score	Overall record	SWCT Record
May 18	Arkansas	Olsen Field • College Station, TX	W 8–3	46–15	1–0
May 19	Texas A&M	Olsen Field • College Station, TX	L 6–15	46–16	1–1
May 20	Arkansas	Olsen Field • College Station, TX	W 9–1	47–16	2–1
May 20	Texas A&M	Olsen Field • College Station, TX	L 4–5	47–17	2–2

NCAA tournament: Midwest Regional

Date	Opponent	Site/stadium	Score	Overall record	NCAAT Record
May 26	New Orleans	Disch–Falk Field • Austin, TX	W 2–0	48–17	1–0
May 27	Southern California	Disch–Falk Field • Austin, TX	W 11–8	49–17	2–0
May 28	Oklahoma State	Disch–Falk Field • Austin, TX	W 8–7	50–17	3–0
May 29	New Orleans	Disch–Falk Field • Austin, TX	W 9–3	51–17	4–0

NCAA tournament: College World Series

Date	Opponent	Site/stadium	Score	Overall record	CWS Record
June 3	Long Beach State	Johnny Rosenblatt Stadium • Omaha, NE	W 7–1	52–17	1–0
June 5	Miami (FL)	Johnny Rosenblatt Stadium • Omaha, NE	W 12–2	53–17	2–0
June 8	LSU	Johnny Rosenblatt Stadium • Omaha, NE	W 12–7	54–17	3–0
June 10	vs Wichita State	Johnny Rosenblatt Stadium • Omaha, NE	L 3–5	54–18	3–1
