= 1989 LSU Tigers baseball team =

American college baseball season

1989 LSU Tigers baseball

NCAA Central Regional champions

College World Series, 2–2
- Conference: Southeastern Conference
- Record: 55–17 (18–9 SEC)
- Head coach: Skip Bertman (6th year)
- Home stadium: Alex Box Stadium

1989 Southeastern Conference baseball standings
	Conf.				Overall
Team	W		L	PCT	W		L	PCT
No. 10 Mississippi State ‍†‍‍^{y}	20	–	5	.800	54	–	14	.794
No. 4 LSU ‍‍‍^{y}	18	–	9	.667	55	–	17	.764
Florida ‍‍‍^{y}	14	–	10	.583	44	–	22	.667
Georgia ‍‍‍	15	–	11	.577	37	–	25	.597
Alabama ‍‍‍	15	–	11	.577	32	–	24	.571
Auburn ‍‍‡‍^{y}	12	–	12	.500	44	–	20	.688
Vanderbilt ‍‍‍	11	–	15	.423	31	–	21	.596
Ole Miss ‍‍‍	9	–	15	.375	34	–	21	.618
Kentucky ‍‍‍	10	–	17	.370	28	–	25	.528
Tennessee ‍‍‍	4	–	23	.148	23	–	36	.390
† – Conference champion ‡ – Tournament champion y – Invited to the NCAA tournament As of June 30, 1989; Rankings from Collegiate Baseball

The 1989 LSU Tigers baseball team represented Louisiana State University in the 1989 NCAA Division I baseball season. The Tigers played their home games at Alex Box Stadium, and played as part of the Southeastern Conference. The team was coached by Skip Bertman in his sixth season as head coach at LSU.

The Tigers reached the College World Series, their third appearance in Omaha, where they finished 4th after wins against Long Beach State and Miami (FL) and losses to Miami and eventual runner-up Texas.

== Personnel ==
=== Roster ===
1989 LSU Tigers roster
Pitchers: 2 - Greg Naquin - Senior; 14 - Jason Wall - Junior; 16 - Paul Byrd - Freshman; 17 - Keith Millay - Freshman; 19 - Ben McDonald - Junior; 30 - Chad Ogea - Freshman; 32 - David Herry - Sophomore; 33 - Russ Springer - Junior; 37 - Mark LaRosa - Sophomore; 40 - Rusty Jenkins - Freshman; 41 - John O'Donoghue - Sophomore; 42 - Curt Leskanic - Junior	Catchers: 5 - Mike Bianco - Senior; 8 - Gary Hymel - Sophomore; 35 - Mickey Mondello - Freshman; 39 - Richard Doughty - Junior; Outfielders: 4 - Ron Lim - Junior; 9 - Todd Waggoner - Senior; 11 - Scott Schneidewind - Senior; 18 - Jared Mula - Freshman; 20 - Matt Gruver - Senior; 21 - Kevin Berry - Junior; 24 - Craig Cala - Senior; 51 - Eric Strovink - Freshman	Infielders: 1 - Tookie Johnson - Sophomore; 3 - Keith Osik - Sophomore; 7 - Chris Moock - Sophomore; 10 - Glenn Haggerty - Freshman; 12 - Pat Garrity - Sophomore; 13 - Luis Garcia - Freshman; 23 - Phil Espinosa - Senior; 27 - Pete Bush - Senior; 29 - Mike Graham - Freshman; 36 - Wes Grisham - Junior

=== Coaches ===
1989 LSU Tigers baseball coaching staff
- Skip Bertman - Head coach - 6th Season
- Smoke Laval - Assistant coach - 4th Season
- Beetle Bailey - Assistant coach
- Jim Wells - Graduate Assistant Coach - 3rd season
- Randy Davis - Graduate Assistant Coach
- Jeff Southall - Graduate Assistant Coach

== Schedule and results ==
Legend
LSU win
LSU loss

1989 LSU Tigers baseball game log
Regular season

February
Date	Opponent	Site/Stadium	Score	Overall Record	SEC Record
Feb 11	TCU*	Alex Box Stadium • Baton Rouge, LA	W 8–2	1–0	
Feb 12	TCU*	Alex Box Stadium • Baton Rouge, LA	W 10–5	2–0	
Feb 14	Southern Miss*	Alex Box Stadium • Baton Rouge, LA	W 10–1	3–0	
Feb 17	Mercer*	Alex Box Stadium • Baton Rouge, LA	W 7–4	4–0	
Feb 18	Mercer*	Alex Box Stadium • Baton Rouge, LA	W 8–7	5–0	
Feb 19	Mercer*	Alex Box Stadium • Baton Rouge, LA	W 12–7	6–0	
Feb 21	Louisiana College*	Alex Box Stadium • Baton Rouge, LA	W 10–3	7–0	
Feb 24	vs Oklahoma State*	Louisiana Superdome • New Orleans, LA (Busch Challenge III)	W 6–0	8–0	
Feb 25	vs Oral Roberts*	Louisiana Superdome • New Orleans, LA (Busch Challenge III)	W 10–7	9–0	
Feb 26	vs Oklahoma*	Louisiana Superdome • New Orleans, LA (Busch Challenge III)	L 7–9^{11}	9–1	
Feb 28	Southern*	Alex Box Stadium • Baton Rouge, LA	W 19–6	10–1	

March
Date	Opponent	Site/Stadium	Score	Overall Record	SEC Record
Mar 1	Southern*	Alex Box Stadium • Baton Rouge, LA	W 5–0^{5}	11–1	
Mar 4	at Tennessee	Lower Hudson Field • Knoxville, TN	L 1–5^{7}	11–2	0–1
Mar 4	at Tennessee	Lower Hudson Field • Knoxville, TN	W 7–0	12–2	1–1
Mar 5	at Tennessee	Lower Hudson Field • Knoxville, TN	W 9–3	13–2	2–1
Mar 8	New Orleans*	Alex Box Stadium • Baton Rouge, LA	W 7–1	14–2	
Mar 11	Florida	Alex Box Stadium • Baton Rouge, LA	W 10–0	15–2	3–1
Mar 12	Florida	Alex Box Stadium • Baton Rouge, LA	W 8–7	16–2	4–1
Mar 12	Florida	Alex Box Stadium • Baton Rouge, LA	W 2–1^{7}	17–2	5–1
Mar 14	George Washington*	Alex Box Stadium • Baton Rouge, LA	W 8–3	18–2	
Mar 15	St. John's*	Alex Box Stadium • Baton Rouge, LA	W 11–8	19–2	
Mar 16	St. John's*	Alex Box Stadium • Baton Rouge, LA	W 12–5	20–2	
Mar 18	at Kentucky	Cliff Hagan Stadium • Lexington, KY	W 11–7^{11}	21–2	6–1
Mar 19	at Kentucky	Cliff Hagan Stadium • Lexington, KY	W 15–0^{7}	22–2	7–1
Mar 19	at Kentucky	Cliff Hagan Stadium • Lexington, KY	L 9–12	22–3	7–2
Mar 23	Northwestern State*	Alex Box Stadium • Baton Rouge, LA	W 6–5	23–3	
Mar 24	Stephen F. Austin*	Alex Box Stadium • Baton Rouge, LA	W 8–3	24–3	
Mar 25	Stephen F. Austin*	Alex Box Stadium • Baton Rouge, LA	W 14–1	25–3	
Mar 26	at Tulane*	Tulane Diamond • New Orleans, LA	W 4–3	26–3	
Mar 28	at Southwestern Louisiana*	Moore Family Field • Lafayette, LA	W 4–1	27–3	
Mar 30	Tulane*	Alex Box Stadium • Baton Rouge, LA	W 4–3^{13}	28–3	

April
Date	Opponent	Site/Stadium	Score	Overall Record	SEC Record
Apr 1	Alabama	Alex Box Stadium • Baton Rouge, LA	W 14–6^{7}	29–3	8–2
Apr 1	Alabama	Alex Box Stadium • Baton Rouge, LA	W 13–6	30–3	9–2
Apr 2	Alabama	Alex Box Stadium • Baton Rouge, LA	W 12–1	31–3	10–2
Apr 5	Southern*	Alex Box Stadium • Baton Rouge, LA	W 9–4	32–3	
Apr 8	at Ole Miss	Swayze Field • Oxford, MS	W 11–5	33–3	11–2
Apr 8	at Ole Miss	Swayze Field • Oxford, MS	W 4–^{7}	34–3	12–2
Apr 9	at Ole Miss	Swayze Field • Oxford, MS	L 1–2	34–4	12–3
Apr 11	Southeastern Louisiana*	Alex Box Stadium • Baton Rouge, LA	W 3–1	35–4	
Apr 12	Nicholls State*	Alex Box Stadium • Baton Rouge, LA	L 4–7	35–5	
Apr 15	Mississippi State	Alex Box Stadium • Baton Rouge, LA	L 3–4^{8}	35–6	12–4
Apr 15	Mississippi State	Alex Box Stadium • Baton Rouge, LA	L 3–4	35–7	12–5
Apr 16	Mississippi State	Alex Box Stadium • Baton Rouge, LA	W 19–9	36–7	13–5
Apr 19	Southwestern Louisiana*	Alex Box Stadium • Baton Rouge, LA	L 6–9	36–8	
Apr 20	at Northwestern State*	H. Alvin Brown–C. C. Stroud Field • Natchitoches, LA	W 14–6	37–8	
Apr 22	at Georgia	Foley Field • Athens, GA	W 7–1^{7}	38–8	14–5
Apr 22	at Georgia	Foley Field • Athens, GA	W 4–3^{10}	39–8	15–5
Apr 23	at Georgia	Foley Field • Athens, GA	L 2–4	39–9	15–6
Apr 25	Northeast Louisiana*	Alex Box Stadium • Baton Rouge, LA	W 7–6	40–9	
Apr 26	at New Orleans*	Privateer Park • New Orleans, LA	W 5–1	41–9	
Apr 29	Vanderbilt	Alex Box Stadium • Baton Rouge, LA	W 12–10^{7}	42–9	16–6
Apr 29	Vanderbilt	Alex Box Stadium • Baton Rouge, LA	W 8–4	43–9	17–6
Apr 30	Vanderbilt	Alex Box Stadium • Baton Rouge, LA	L 2–9	43–10	17–7

May
Date	Opponent	Site/Stadium	Score	Overall Record	SEC Record
May 6	at Auburn	Plainsman Park • Auburn, AL	L 0–1^{7}	43–11	17–8
May 6	at Auburn	Plainsman Park • Auburn, AL	L 8–12	43–12	17–9
May 7	at Auburn	Plainsman Park • Auburn, AL	W 8–1	44–12	18–9

Postseason

SEC Tournament
Date	Opponent	Seed	Site/Stadium	Score	Overall Record	SECT Record
May 11	(5) Georgia	(2)	Alfred A. McKethan Stadium • Gainesville, FL	W 6–3	45–12	1–0
May 12	(3) Florida	(2)	Alfred A. McKethan Stadium • Gainesville, FL	L 6–8	45–13	1–1
May 13	(6) Auburn	(2)	Alfred A. McKethan Stadium • Gainesville, FL	L 5–8	45–14	1–2

May
Date	Opponent	Site/Stadium	Score	Overall Record
May 19	Louisiana Tech*	Alex Box Stadium • Baton Rouge, LA	W 17–2	46–14
May 20	Louisiana Tech*	Alex Box Stadium • Baton Rouge, LA	W 7–1	47–14
May 21	Louisiana Tech*	Alex Box Stadium • Baton Rouge, LA	W 8–5	48–14

NCAA Central Regional
Date	Opponent	Seed	Site/Stadium	Score	Overall Record	Reg Record
May 25	(5) UNLV	(2)	Olsen Field • College Station, TX	W 12–10	49–14	1–0
May 26	(3) South Alabama	(2)	Olsen Field • College Station, TX	L 4–6	49–15	1–1
May 27	(5) UNLV	(2)	Olsen Field • College Station, TX	W 13–8	50–15	2–1
May 27	(3) South Alabama	(2)	Olsen Field • College Station, TX	W 6–5	51–15	3–1
May 28	(1) Texas A&M	(2)	Olsen Field • College Station, TX	W 13–5	52–15	4–1
May 28	(1) Texas A&M	(2)	Olsen Field • College Station, TX	W 5–4^{11}	53–15	5–1

College World Series
Date	Opponent	Seed	Site/Stadium	Score	Overall Record	CWS Record
June 3	(3) Miami (FL)	(6)	Johnny Rosenblatt Stadium • Omaha, NE	L 2–5	53–16	0–1
June 4	(7)Long Beach State	(6)	Johnny Rosenblatt Stadium • Omaha, NE	W 8–5	54–16	1–1
June 6	(3) Miami (FL)	(6)	Johnny Rosenblatt Stadium • Omaha, NE	W 6–3	55–16	2–1
June 8	(2) Texas	(6)	Johnny Rosenblatt Stadium • Omaha, NE	L 12–7	55–17	2–2
