= Alan Zinter =

American baseball player & coach (born 1968)

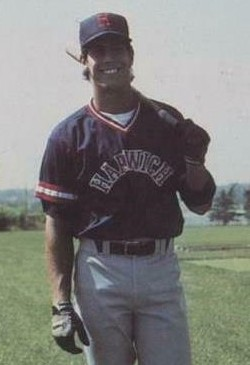
- First baseman
- Born: May 19, 1968 (age 58); El Paso, Texas, U.S.
- Batted: Switch Threw: Right

Professional debut
- NPB: May 14, 1999, for the Seibu Lions
- MLB: June 18, 2002, for the Houston Astros

Last appearance
- NPB: August 28, 1999, for the Seibu Lions
- MLB: October 3, 2004, for the Arizona Diamondbacks

NPB statistics
- Batting average: .202
- Home runs: 8
- Runs batted in: 28

MLB statistics
- Batting average: .167
- Home runs: 3
- Runs batted in: 9
- Stats at Baseball Reference

Teams
- As player: Seibu Lions (1999); Houston Astros (2002); Arizona Diamondbacks (2004); As coach: Houston Astros (2015); San Diego Padres (2016–2017); Cincinnati Reds (2020–2022)

Alan Michael Zinter (born May 19, 1968) is an American former professional baseball player and hitting coach. He played for Seibu Lions of Nippon Professional Baseball (NPB) in 1999 and with the Houston Astros and Arizona Diamondbacks of Major League Baseball (MLB) in 2002 and 2004, respectively. He served as the minor league hitting coordinator for the Cleveland Indians, the assistant hitting coach for the Astros, and was the hitting coach of the San Diego Padres and Cincinnati Reds.

== Playing career ==
Zinter played for the Arizona Wildcats baseball team, and in 1988 he played collegiate summer baseball with the Harwich Mariners of the Cape Cod Baseball League. He was a 1st round draft choice (24th overall) by the New York Mets in 1989 as a catcher, but eventually moved to first base. He played in the minors for fourteen years, including one season in the Dominican winter league for the Cibao Giants in 1996 and one season in Japan for the Seibu Lions in 1999, before finally getting a call-up with the Houston Astros in 2002. His first hit was a home run off Scott Williamson and he batted .136 (6 for 44). In 2004, he earned another call-up with the Arizona Diamondbacks, doing slightly better hitting .206 (7 for 34).

Zinter played in 2006 with the Round Rock Express, the Triple-A affiliate of the Houston Astros, but mostly as a pinch hitter and a defensive replacement. In 2007, Zinter played for the Somerset Patriots of the independent Atlantic League.

== Coaching career ==
In 2008, Zinter began his coaching career with the Rookie level Missoula Osprey in the Diamondbacks organization. On December 2, 2008, Zinter was announced as the hitting coach for the High-A Visalia Rawhide. After two seasons with Visalia, he was moved up to Double-A to be the hitting coach of the Mobile BayBears. He was hired by the Indians to be their minor league hitting coordinator for the 2012 season.

On November 4, 2014, Zinter was announced as the new assistant hitting coach for the Houston Astros by general manager Jeff Luhnow. After the 2015 season, the San Diego Padres hired Zinter as their hitting coach. On September 1, 2017, Zinter was fired by the Padres. In 2018 and 2019, Zinter worked as the San Francisco Giants Assistant Director of Player Development, Offense. On October 24, 2019, the Cincinnati Reds announced the hiring of Zinter as their hitting coach. On October 6, 2022, the Reds announced that Zinter would not return for the 2023 season.

On January 16, 2026, Zinter was hired to serve as a hitting coach for the Arizona Complex League Royals, the rookie-level affiliate of the Kansas City Royals.

== Personal life ==
Zinter is married to Yvonne.
