= Greg Brummett =

American baseball player (born 1967)

- Starting pitcher
- Born: April 20, 1967 (age 59); Wichita, Kansas, U.S.
- Batted: Right Threw: Right

MLB debut
- May 29, 1993, for the San Francisco Giants

Last MLB appearance
- September 30, 1993, for the Minnesota Twins

MLB statistics
- Win–loss record: 4–4
- Earned run average: 5.08
- Strikeouts: 30
- Stats at Baseball Reference

Teams
- San Francisco Giants (1993); Minnesota Twins (1993)

Gregory Scott "Spike" Brummett (born April 20, 1967) is an American former right-handed Major League Baseball starting pitcher who played for the San Francisco Giants and Minnesota Twins in 1993.

Prior to playing professionally, Brummett attended Wichita State University. With them, he won the 1989 College World Series Most Outstanding Player award while a senior. He is the only player from Wichita State University to win that award. In 1989, he tied for the Division I lead in wins with Kirk Dressendorfer and Scott Erickson. That total also tied him with Bryan Oelkers for most wins ever by a Wichita State pitcher.

To close out his collegiate career, he had 13 straight victories. Overall, he had 43 wins, 59 starts and 424 innings pitched in his collegiate career. He also had 364 strikeouts.

Brummett was drafted by the Giants in the 11th round of the 1989 amateur draft. He played for two different minor league teams in 1989, the San Jose Giants and the Everett Giants. For San Jose, he went 0–1 with a 5.59 ERA in two games. For Everett, he went 4–2 with a 2.88 ERA in 14 games (10 starts).

In 1990, Brummett played for the Clinton Giants, going 2–2 with a 3.51 ERA in six games (four starts). He again played for Clinton in 1991, going 10–5 with a 2.72 ERA in 16 games. Brummett split the 1992 season with the San Jose Giants and the Phoenix Firebirds. He appeared in 19 games for the Firebirds, going 10–4 with a 2.61 ERA. In three games with Phoenix, he went 0–1 with a 7.71 ERA.

He spent about half of the 1993 season in the minors and half in the big leagues. In the minors, he played for Phoenix, going 7–7 with a 3.62 ERA in 18 starts. On May 29, he made his major league debut, against the Atlanta Braves, pitching 6 2/3 innings, striking out three batters (all three were Ron Gant) and earning the win. He would end up pitching eight games for the Giants, going 2–3 with a 4.70 ERA.

On September 1, 1993, he was the player to be named later in a deal that originally took place on August 28. The Giants sent a player to be named later (Brummett), Aaron Fultz and minor leaguer Andres Duncan to the Twins for Jim Deshaies. Brummett would start five games for the Twins, going 2–1 with a 5.74 ERA. Overall, he went 4–4 with a 5.08 ERA in 13 big league games. He played his final game on September 30.

Although his big league career was over, his professional career was not. In fact, he played in 1994 for the Pawtucket Red Sox of the Boston Red Sox organization and the Salt Lake Buzz in the Twins organization. He went 1–1 with a 5.27 ERA in eight games for the Red Sox and 4–3 with a 5.53 ERA in 13 games with the Buzz. He did not play professionally in 1995, but in 1996 he played for the Tyler Wildcatters of the Texas–Louisiana League. He went 4–9 with a 4.37 ERA in 13 games with them.

He was inducted into the Wichita State University Hall of Fame in 1995.
