= Brad Woodall =

American baseball player (born 1969)

- Pitcher
- Born: June 25, 1969 (age 56); Atlanta, Georgia, U.S.
- Batted: Both Threw: Left

MLB debut
- July 22, 1994, for the Atlanta Braves

Last MLB appearance
- May 5, 1999, for the Chicago Cubs

MLB statistics
- Win–loss record: 10–14
- Earned run average: 5.31
- Strikeouts: 119
- Stats at Baseball Reference

Teams
- Atlanta Braves (1994–1996); Milwaukee Brewers (1998); Chicago Cubs (1999)

David Bradley Woodall (born June 25, 1969) is an American former professional baseball pitcher. He played parts of five seasons in Major League Baseball between 1994 and 1999 for the Atlanta Braves, Milwaukee Brewers and Chicago Cubs.

== Career ==
Woodall played college baseball for the University of North Carolina at Chapel Hill. While at UNC in 1990, he played collegiate summer baseball with the Wareham Gatemen of the Cape Cod Baseball League and was named a league all-star.

A left-hander, Atlanta signed Woodall as an amateur free agent in 1991. He made his Major League debut with the Braves on July 22, 1994, and appeared in his final game on May 5, 1999.
