= Jesse Levis =

American baseball player (born 1968)

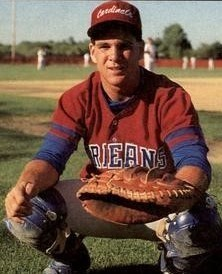
- Catcher
- Born: April 14, 1968 (age 57); Philadelphia, Pennsylvania, U.S.
- Batted: Left Threw: Right

MLB debut
- April 24, 1992, for the Cleveland Indians

Last MLB appearance
- October 7, 2001, for the Milwaukee Brewers

MLB statistics
- Batting average: .255
- Home runs: 3
- Runs batted in: 60
- Stats at Baseball Reference

Teams
- Cleveland Indians (1992–1995); Milwaukee Brewers (1996–1998); Cleveland Indians (1999); Milwaukee Brewers (2001)
Medals
Men's baseball
Representing United States
World Junior Baseball Championship
Bronze medal – third place	1986 Windsor	Team

Jesse Levis (born April 14, 1968) is an American Major League Baseball scout and former Major League Baseball player. He played for the Cleveland Indians and Milwaukee Brewers between 1992 and 2001.

== Career ==
After starting as a catcher at Northeast High School in Philadelphia, he accepted a baseball scholarship to the University of North Carolina. In 1987 and 1988, he played collegiate summer baseball with the Orleans Cardinals of the Cape Cod Baseball League and was named a league all-star in 1988.

Levis was selected by the Cleveland Indians in the 4th round of the 1989 MLB draft. He became a journeyman catcher, playing for the Indians in 1992, 1993, 1994, 1995, and 1999. He also played for the Milwaukee Brewers in 1996, 1997, 1998, and 2001. He played Minor League Baseball with not only the Indians and Brewers organizations, but also the Tampa Bay Devil Rays, Atlanta Braves, Cincinnati Reds, Philadelphia Phillies, and New York Mets organizations. He last played professional baseball in 2004 with the Norfolk Tides.

After retiring, he was hired on November 7, 2006, to be a scout for the Boston Red Sox. He scouted for the Red Sox for two seasons. Levis is Jewish.
