= 1989 NCAA Division I baseball rankings =

1989 NCAA Division I baseball season

Tournament

College World Series
- Champions: Wichita State
- Runners-up: Texas
- MOP: Greg Brummett (Wichita State)

Seasons
- ← 1988 1990 →

The following polls make up the 1989 NCAA Division I baseball rankings. Baseball America began publishing its poll of the top 20 teams in college baseball in 1981. Beginning with the 1985 season, it expanded to the top 25. Collegiate Baseball Newspaper published its first human poll of the top 20 teams in college baseball in 1957, and expanded to rank the top 30 teams in 1961.

== Baseball America ==
Currently, only the final poll from the 1989 season is available.

Rank	Team
1	Wichita State
2	Texas A&M
3	Texas
4	Florida State
5	Miami (FL)
6	Mississippi State
7	LSU
8	Long Beach State
9	Arizona
10	Arkansas
11	Arizona State
12	Fresno State
13	North Carolina
14	Clemson
15	Oklahoma State
16	Loyola Marymount
17	Auburn
18	Southern California
19	Michigan
20	South Florida
21	Florida
22	Pepperdine
23	UNLV
24	Jacksonville
25	Villanova

== Collegiate Baseball ==
Currently, only the final poll from the 1989 season is available.

Rank	Team
1	Wichita State
2	Texas
3	Florida State
4	LSU
5	Arkansas
6	Miami (FL)
7	Long Beach State
8	North Carolina
9	Texas A&M
10	Mississippi State
11	Arizona
12	Michigan
13	Fresno State
14	Clemson
15	Oklahoma State
16	Le Moyne
17	Arizona State
18	Loyola Marymount
19	Oklahoma
20	South Alabama
21	Arizona
22	Indiana State
23	Notre Dame
24	Illinois
25	UCF
26	Southern California
27	Pepperdine
28	South Florida
29	Jacksonville
30	UNLV
