= 1989 NCAA Division I baseball tournament =

- Season: 1989
- Teams: 48
- Finals site: Johnny Rosenblatt Stadium; Omaha, NE
- Champions: Wichita State (1st title)
- Runner-up: Texas (25th CWS Appearance)
- Winning coach: Gene Stephenson (1st title)
- MOP: Greg Brummett (Wichita State)

The 1989 NCAA Division I baseball tournament was played at the end of the 1989 NCAA Division I baseball season to determine the national champion of college baseball. The tournament concluded with eight teams competing in the College World Series, a double-elimination tournament in its forty third year. Eight regional competitions were held to determine the participants in the final event. Each region was composed of six teams, resulting in 48 teams participating in the tournament at the conclusion of their regular season, and in some cases, after a conference tournament. The forty-third tournament's champion was Wichita State, coached by Gene Stephenson. The Most Outstanding Player was Greg Brummett of Wichita State.

== Regionals ==
The opening rounds of the tournament were played across eight regional sites across the country, each consisting of a six-team field. Each regional tournament is double-elimination, however region brackets are variable depending on the number of teams remaining after each round. The winners of each regional advanced to the College World Series.

Bold indicates winner.

=== Atlantic Regional ===
at Tallahassee, FL

First round
1	**Florida State**	**13**
6	Rider	7
2	**Clemson**	**6**
5	Stetson	2
3	**Auburn**	**9**
4	South Florida	3

Second round
**Florida State**	**8**
South Florida	1
Clemson	7
**Auburn**	**14**
Rider	6
**Stetson**	**13**

Third round
**Florida State**	**7**
Auburn	6
**Clemson**	**13**
Stetson	5

Semifinals
Auburn	1
**Clemson**	**11**

Final
**Florida State**	**8**	—
Clemson	1	—

=== South Regional ===
at Starkville, MS

First round
1	**Mississippi State**	**8**
6	Western Carolina	0
2	**Jacksonville**	**3**
5	Indiana State	2
3	**North Carolina**	**8**
4	Nicholls State	4

Second round
**Mississippi State**	**11**
Nicholls State	2
Jacksonville	3
**North Carolina**	**8**
Western Carolina	3
**Indiana State**	**10**

Third round
Mississippi State	1
**North Carolina**	**2**
Jacksonville	4
**Indiana State**	**9**

Semifinals
**Mississippi State**	**11**
Indiana State	2

Final
**North Carolina**	0	**7**
Mississippi State	**6**	1

=== Northeast Regional ===
at Waterbury, CT

First round
1	Arkansas	5
6	**Le Moyne**	**7**
2	**Arizona State**	**5**
5	George Washington	0
3	**Penn**	**7**
4	Illinois	1

Second round
Le Moyne	0
**Illinois**	**7**
George Washington	2
**Arkansas**	**8**
**Arizona State**	**15**
Penn	4
Penn	16
**Le Moyne**	**18**^{12}

Third round
Illinois	2
**Arkansas**	**9**
Arizona State	2
**Le Moyne**	**4**

Semifinals
**Arkansas**	**1**
Arizona State	0

Final
**Arkansas**	**6**
Le Moyne	5

=== Central Regional ===
at College Station, TX

First round
1	**Texas A&M**	**23**
6	Jackson State	3
2	**LSU**	**12**
5	UNLV	10
3	**South Alabama**	**11**^{10}
4	BYU	10

Second round
**Texas A&M**	**25**
BYU	4
LSU	4
**South Alabama**	**6**
Jackson State	2
**UNLV**	**13**

Third round
**Texas A&M**	**17**
South Alabama	5
**LSU**	**13**
UNLV	8

Semifinals
South Alabama	5
**LSU**	**6**

Final
Texas A&M	5	4
**LSU**	**13**	**5**^{11}

=== West I Regional ===
at Tucson, AZ

First round
1	**Arizona**	**12**
6	Eastern Kentucky	6
2	**Oklahoma**	**5**
5	Loyola Marymount	2
3	**Long Beach State**	**14**
4	Hawaii	7

Second round
**Arizona**	**17**
Hawaii	3
Oklahoma	4
**Long Beach State**	**11**
Eastern Kentucky	3
**Loyola Marymount**	**9**

Third round
Arizona	6
**Long Beach State**	**10**
Oklahoma	5
**Loyola Marymount**	**6**^{11}

Semifinals
**Arizona**	**13**
Loyola Marymount	4

Final
**Long Beach State**	**10**	–
Arizona	3	–

=== West II Regional ===
at Fresno, CA

First round
1	**Wichita State**	**4**
6	Portland	0
2	**Fresno State**	**9**
5	Notre Dame	8
3	**Michigan**	**4**
4	Pepperdine	3

Second round
**Wichita State**	**12**
Pepperdine	1
Fresno State	3
**Michigan**	**5**
Portland	6
**Notre Dame**	**8**^{13}

Third round
Wichita State	5
**Michigan**	**14**
**Fresno State**	**11**
Notre Dame	4

Semifinals
**Wichita State**	**6**
Fresno State	4

Final
Michigan	2	5
**Wichita State**	**3**	**9**

=== Midwest Regional ===
at Austin, TX

First round
1	**Texas**	**2**
6	New Orleans	0
2	**Oklahoma State**	**6**
5	Sam Houston State	5
3	**Western Michigan**	**9**
4	USC	8

Second round
**Texas**	**11**
USC	8
**Oklahoma State**	**8**^{10}
Western Michigan	3
Sam Houston State	4
**New Orleans**	**8**

Third round
**Texas**	**8**
Oklahoma State	7
Western Michigan	5
**New Orleans**	**6**

Semifinals
Oklahoma State	2
**New Orleans**	**3**

Final
**Texas**	**9**	—
New Orleans	3	—

=== East Regional ===
at Gainesville, FL

First round
1	**Miami (FL)**	**3**
6	Villanova	1
2	**Florida**	**11**
5	East Carolina	6
3	**UCF**	**6**
4	Georgia Tech	4

Second round
Miami (FL)	7
**Georgia Tech**	**9**
**Villanova**	**10**
East Carolina	6
Florida	7
**UCF**	**10**
Florida	1
**Miami (FL)**	**9**

Third round
Georgia Tech	16
**Villanova**	**18**^{10}
UCF	1
**Miami (FL)**	**10**

Semifinals
**Villanova**	**5**
UCF	2

Final
Villanova	1
**Miami (FL)**	**4**

== College World Series ==
=== Participants ===
Seeding	School	Conference	Record (conference)	Head coach	CWS appearances	CWS best finish	CWS record
1	Florida State	Metro	52–16 (14–4)	Mike Martin	9 (last: 1987)	2nd (1970, 1986)	13–18
2	Texas	SWC	51–17 (14–7)	Cliff Gustafson	24 (last: 1987)	1st (1949, 1950, 1975, 1983)	58–42
3	Miami (FL)	n/a	48–16 (n/a)	Ron Fraser	10 (last: 1988)	1st (1982, 1985)	23–17
4	Wichita State	MVC	63–15 (13–5)	Gene Stephenson	2 (last: 1988)	2nd (1982)	5–4
5	Arkansas	SWC	50–14 (17–4)	Norm DeBriyn	3 (last: 1987)	2nd (1979)	6–6
6	LSU	SEC	53–15 (18–9)	Skip Bertman	2 (last: 1987)	4th (1987)	3–4
7	Long Beach State	Big West	50–13 (17–4)	Dave Snow	0 (last: none)	none	0–0
8	North Carolina	ACC	41–16–1 (15–4)	Mike Roberts	3 (last: 1978)	3rd (1978)	2–6

=== Results ===
The teams in the CWS were divided into two pools of four, with each pool playing a double-elimination format. For the second time since the College World Series began in 1947, the series was not a true double elimination tournament. Instead, the winners of the two pools met in a single National Championship game. Texas came out of its pool with no losses. Wichita State came out of its pool with one loss. Wichita State defeated Texas in the Championship game. Because each team only had one loss, in the championships prior to 1988, the teams would have played a winner-take-all game for the championship. Therefore, when Texas lost the championship game, rather than play another game for the championship, Wichita State was crowned champion. This new format was adopted for television reasons for the final game. Later, the format was switched to a best of three series in 2003.

==== Bracket ====
First round
1	Florida State	4
8	North Carolina	2
4	Wichita State	3
5	Arkansas	1
8	North Carolina	3
5	Arkansas	7
2	Texas	7
7	Long Beach State	1
3	Miami (FL)	5
6	LSU	2
7	Long Beach State	5
6	LSU	8

Second round
1	Florida State	4
4	Wichita State	2
5	Arkansas	4
4	Wichita State	8
2	Texas	12
3	Miami (FL)	2
6	LSU	6
3	Miami (FL)	3

Semifinals
1	Florida State	4	9
4	Wichita State	7	12
2	Texas	12	—
6	LSU	7	—

Finals
4	Wichita State	5
2	Texas	3

==== Game results ====
Date	Game	Winner	Score	Loser	Notes
June 2	Game 1	Florida State	4–2	North Carolina	
June 2	Game 2	Wichita State	3–1	Arkansas	
June 3	Game 3	Texas	7–1	Long Beach State	
June 3	Game 4	Miami (FL)	5–2	LSU	
June 4	Game 5	Arkansas	7–3	North Carolina	North Carolina eliminated
June 4	Game 6	LSU	8–5	Long Beach State	Long Beach State eliminated
June 5	Game 7	Florida State	4–2	Wichita State	
June 5	Game 8	Texas	12–2	Miami (FL)	
June 6	Game 9	Wichita State	8–4	Arkansas	Arkansas eliminated
June 6	Game 10	LSU	6–3	Miami (FL)	Miami eliminated
June 7	Game 11	Wichita State	7–4	Florida State	
June 8	Game 12	Texas	12–7	LSU	Louisiana State eliminated
June 9	Game 13	Wichita State	12–9	Florida State	Florida State eliminated
June 10	Final	Wichita State	5–3	Texas	Wichita State wins CWS

=== All-Tournament Team ===
The following players were members of the All-Tournament Team.

Position	Player	School
P	Greg Brummett (MOP)	Wichita State
P	Jim Newlin	Wichita State
C	Eric Wedge	Wichita State
1B	David Lowery	Texas
2B	Rocky Rau	Florida State
3B	Craig Newkirk	Texas
SS. Mark Mitchell Miami Hurricanes
OF	Jim Audley	Wichita State
OF	Arthur Butcher	Texas
OF	Todd Dreifort	Wichita State
DH	Scott Bryant	Texas

=== Notable players ===
- Arkansas: Bubba Carpenter, Mike Oquist, Scott Pose, Phil Stidham
- Florida State: Chris Brock, Matt Dunbar, Gar Finnvold, Eduardo Pérez, Marc Ronan
- Long Beach State: Kyle Abbott, Darrell Sherman, Tom Urbani, Dan Berthel
- LSU: Paul Byrd, Curt Leskanic, Ben McDonald, John O'Donoghue, Chad Ogea, Keith Osik, Russ Springer
- Miami (FL): Jorge Fábregas, Alex Fernández, Joe Grahe, Oscar Múñoz, F.P. Santangelo Mark Mitchell SS
- North Carolina: Jim Dougherty, Jesse Levis, Brad Woodall
- Texas: Kirk Dressendorfer, Shane Reynolds
- Wichita State: Greg Brummett, P. J. Forbes, Tyler Green, Mike Lansing, Pat Meares, Eric Wedge
- George Washington Colonials: John Flaherty

== See also ==
- 1989 NCAA Division II baseball tournament
- 1989 NCAA Division III baseball tournament
- 1989 NAIA World Series
