= Texas Longhorns baseball =

College baseball Team

- 2027 Texas Longhorns baseball team
- Founded: 1894 (131 years ago)
- Overall record: 3,863–1,469–32 (.723)
- University: University of Texas at Austin
- Head coach: Jim Schlossnagle (2nd season)
- Conference: SEC
- Location: Austin, Texas
- Home stadium: UFCU Disch–Falk Field (capacity: 7,373)
- Nickname: Longhorns
- Colors: Burnt orange and white

College World Series champions
- 1949, 1950, 1975, 1983, 2002, 2005

College World Series runner-up
- 1953, 1984, 1985, 1989, 2004, 2009

College World Series appearances
- 1949, 1950, 1952, 1953, 1957, 1961, 1962, 1963, 1965, 1966, 1968, 1969, 1970, 1972, 1973, 1974, 1975, 1979, 1981, 1982, 1983, 1984, 1985, 1987, 1989, 1992, 1993, 2000, 2002, 2003, 2004, 2005, 2009, 2011, 2014, 2018, 2021, 2022, 2026

NCAA regional champions
- 1975, 1979, 1981, 1982, 1983, 1984, 1985, 1987, 1989, 1992, 1993, 2000, 2002, 2003, 2004, 2005, 2009, 2010, 2011, 2014, 2018, 2021, 2022, 2023, 2026

NCAA tournament appearances
- 1947, 1949, 1950, 1952, 1953, 1954, 1957, 1958, 1960, 1961, 1962, 1963, 1965, 1966, 1967, 1968, 1969, 1970, 1971, 1972, 1973, 1974, 1975, 1976, 1979, 1980, 1981, 1982, 1983, 1984, 1985, 1986, 1987, 1988, 1989, 1990, 1991, 1992, 1993, 1994, 1995, 1996, 1999, 2000, 2001, 2002, 2003, 2004, 2005, 2006, 2007, 2008, 2009, 2010, 2011, 2014, 2015, 2017, 2018, 2021, 2022, 2023, 2024, 2025, 2026

Conference tournament champions
- SWC; 1979, 1980, 1981, 1982, 1983, 1984, 1987, 1988, 1990, 1991, 1994 Big 12; 2002, 2003, 2008, 2009, 2015

Conference regular season champions
- SIAA; 1900, 1905, 1907, 1908 TIAA; 1913, 1914 SWC; 1915, 1916, 1917, 1918, 1919, 1920, 1921, 1922, 1924, 1925, 1926, 1927, 1928, 1929, 1930, 1932, 1935, 1936, 1938, 1939, 1940, 1941, 1943, 1945, 1946, 1947, 1948, 1949, 1950, 1951, 1952, 1953, 1954, 1957, 1958, 1960, 1961, 1962, 1963, 1965, 1966, 1967, 1968, 1969, 1970, 1971, 1972, 1973, 1974, 1975, 1976, 1979, 1980, 1981, 1982, 1983, 1984, 1985, 1986, 1987, 1988, 1991, 1992, 1996 Big 12; 2002, 2004, 2006, 2007, 2009, 2010, 2011, 2018, 2021, 2023 SEC; 2025

The Texas Longhorns baseball team represents The University of Texas at Austin in NCAA Division I intercollegiate men's baseball competition. The Longhorns currently compete in the Southeastern Conference.

The University of Texas began varsity competition in baseball in 1894. Texas is the winningest NCAA Division I college baseball program of all time in terms of win percentage, with an all-time win–loss record of 3863–1469–32 (.723) as of the end of the 2024 season, including a 3693–1321–28 (.735) record versus collegiate opponents. The Longhorns rank second in all-time wins, behind the Fordham Rams. Texas has won 81 regular-season conference championships and 16 conference tournament championships in baseball.

The Longhorns have won six NCAA baseball national championships (1949, 1950, 1975, 1983, 2002, 2005)—the third most behind LSU's total of eight and Southern California's total of 12—and have been the runner-up in the College World Series (CWS) Championship Game or Championship Series on six other occasions (1953, 1984, 1985, 1989, 2004, 2009). Texas holds the records for most appearances in the College World Series (39), most individual CWS games won (89), most overall NCAA Tournament games won (266), and most NCAA tournament appearances (65); the second-place programs in these categories have 25 CWS appearances (Miami), 74 CWS game wins (Southern California), 213 overall NCAA Tournament wins (Florida State), and 62 NCAA tournament appearances (Florida State), as of June 15, 2026. As such, Texas is often considered to be one of the greatest programs in college baseball history.

Former Longhorns who have gone on to success in Major League Baseball include Roger Clemens, Calvin Schiraldi, Burt Hooton, Keith Moreland, Spike Owen, Mark Petkovsek, Greg Swindell, Brandon Belt, and Huston Street.

Texas hired first-year head coach Jim Schlossnagle away from rival Texas A&M on June 25, 2024. From 1997 to 2016, the Longhorns were led by head coach Augie Garrido, who ranks second in total wins in NCAA baseball history behind former Florida State head coach Mike Martin.

Texas plays its home games at UFCU Disch-Falk Field.

== History ==
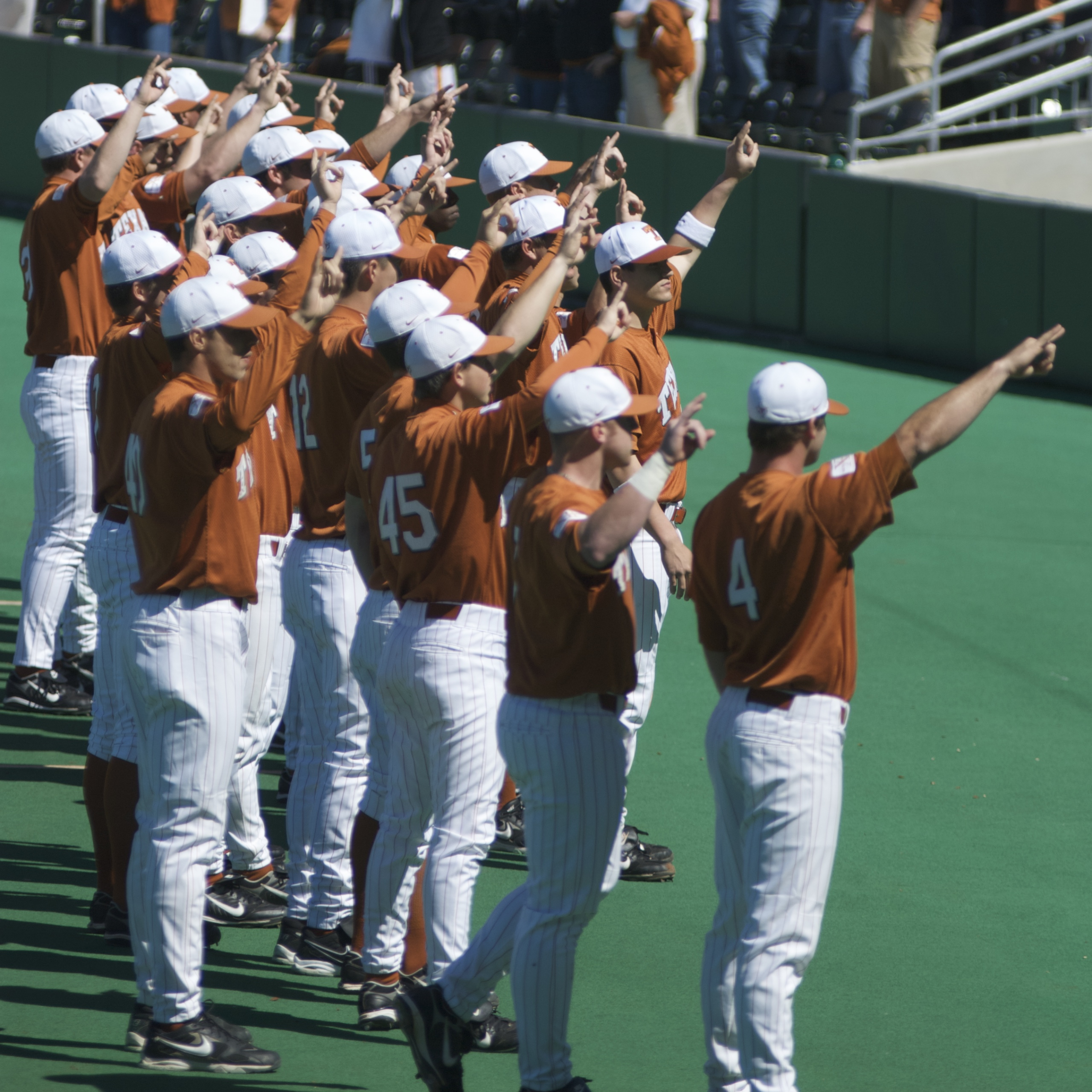
The Longhorn baseball team gives the Hook 'em Horns sign after a game.

The Longhorn baseball program has been remarkably stable over the last century. Over a 105-year period (1911–2016), it had only four full-time coaches—Billy Disch (1911–1939), Bibb Falk (1940–1967), Cliff Gustafson (1968–1996), and Augie Garrido (1997–2016). David Pierce, previously head coach at Tulane University, was hired as Texas' fifth head coach on June 29, 2016.

The Longhorns have won national titles in 1949, 1950, 1975, 1983, 2002, and 2005.

=== The early years (1894–1910) ===
The Texas Longhorns baseball team started in 1894, with the first game in 1895. Records from the first two years are incomplete. The first collegiate victory was over Add-Ran College, what is today Texas Christian University, on April 21, 1897. Seven different managers, including some that were also the school's football coach, led the team. Four times, the team won a conference title, including one in the Southern Intercollegiate Athletic Association and three in the Southwestern Intercollegiate Athletic Association. The team played its home games in the first Clark Field during this time.

=== William J. "Billy" Disch era (1911–1939) ===
In 1911, Billy Disch took over the reins of the program. Disch retired following the 1939 season. During this time, he led the Longhorns to 22 conference titles, with two in the Texas Intercollegiate Athletic Association and 20 in the Southwest Conference. This included a run of 10 consecutive conference titles from 1913 to 1922. Disch won 465 collegiate games during his tenure with the Longhorns. In 1928, the team moved to the second Clark Field, which was famous for its limestone cliff and goat path in left-center field.

=== Bibb Falk era (1940–1967) ===
In 1940, former Longhorn baseball and major league outfielder Bibb Falk became the head coach. Except for a three-year period from 1943 to 1945, during which the team was led by assistant football coach Blair Cherry, Falk coached the team until 1967. Under Falk's guidance, the Longhorns won 20 Southwest Conference titles; the Longhorns won two conference titles under Cherry. Under Falk, Texas won its first two College World Series championships (in 1949 and 1950). The Longhorns won 434 collegiate games during his tenure.

=== Cliff Gustafson era (1968–1996) ===
Falk retired after the 1967 season and was succeeded by one of his former players, Cliff Gustafson. During his time in Austin, Gustafson led the Longhorns to 22 conference titles, 11 conference tournament championships, and College World Series championships in 1975 and 1983. Texas won 1,427 collegiate games during his tenure. In 1975, the school moved from the second Clark Field into the new Disch-Falk Field, which was named for Billy Disch and Bibb Falk.

=== Augie Garrido era (1997–2016) ===
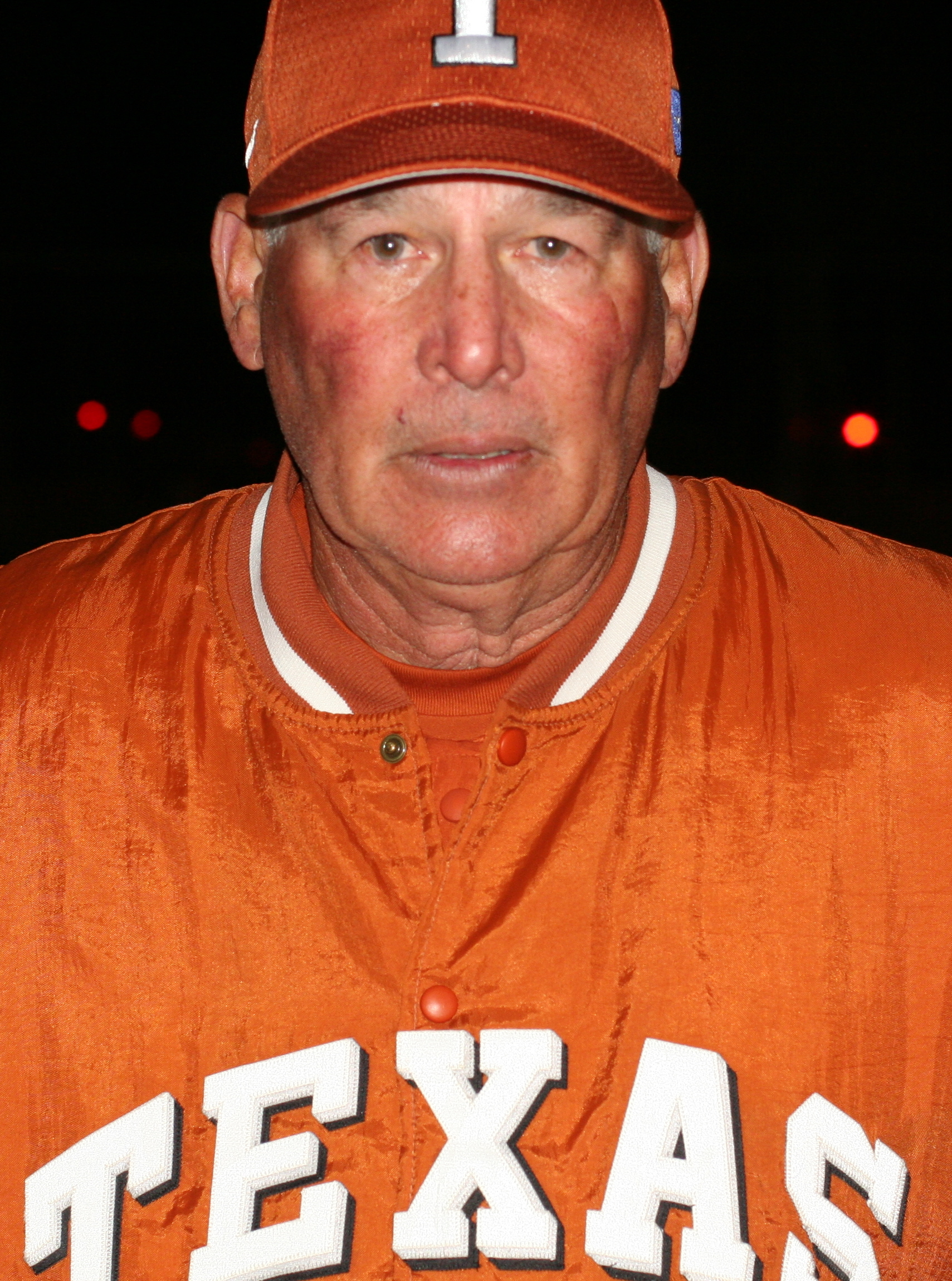
Augie Garrido

After Cliff Gustafson retired in 1996, Augie Garrido took over the helm at Texas. During his tenure, the school won seven Big 12 Conference titles, four conference tournament championships, and two national championships, in 2002 and 2005. Garrido died on March 15, 2018.

=== David Pierce era (2017–2024) ===
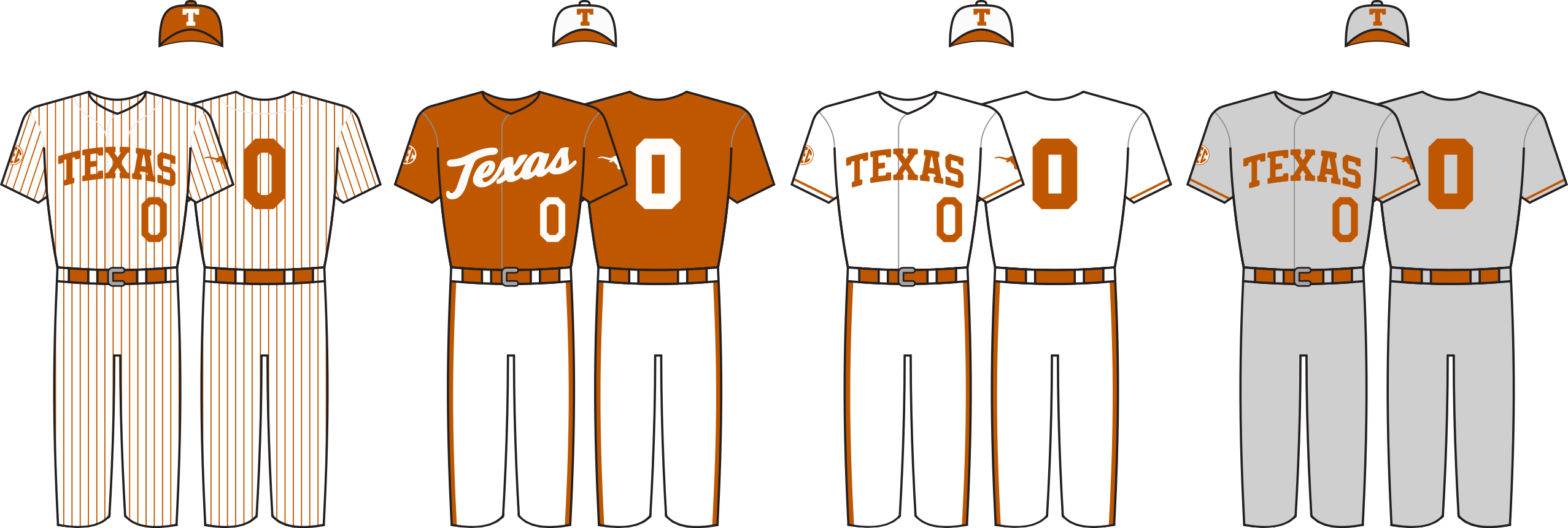
The Longhorn baseball uniforms.

On June 29, 2016, it was announced that David Pierce (previously head coach at Tulane and Sam Houston State) would take over being head coach at the Longhorns after the announcement of Augie Garrido's resignation.

Through 2018 Coach Pierce's teams have appeared in the NCAA baseball tournament in all seven years he has been a head coach (2012–2018), including 2017–2018 with the Longhorns.

In 2018, the Texas Longhorns won the Big 12 Championship for the first time since 2011. In the 2018 NCAA tournament they advanced to and hosted an NCAA Super Regional for the first time since 2008 by defeating Texas Southern, Texas A&M and Indiana University in the NCAA Austin regional. They defeated Tennessee Tech in three games to advance to the 2018 College World Series.

Texas fired Pierce on June 24, 2024. The Longhorns finished 2024 with loss to Louisiana-Lafayette at the College Station Regionals setting their 2024 record to 36-24. The team under Pierce finished with a 4.91 ERA as a team. The program's highest single-season ERA since the 1999 team posted an ERA of 5.92.

=== Jim Schlossnagle era (2025–present) ===
Texas hired first-year head coach Jim Schlossnagle away from rival Texas A&M on June 25, 2024.

=== National championship teams ===
==== 1949 ====
The Longhorns defeated Wake Forest 10–3 in the championship game to claim their first national championship. Notable players on the team include Charlie Gorin, Tom Hamilton, and Murray Wall.

==== 1950 ====
Texas defeated Washington State 3–0 to become the first school to repeat as champions of the College World Series. Notable players on the team include: Charlie Gorin, Kal Segrist, and Murray Wall.

==== 1975 ====
Texas won their third national championship in school history by defeating South Carolina 5–1 in the championship game. Notable players on the team include Jim Gideon, Don Kainer, Keith Moreland, Mickey Reichenbach, and Richard Wortham.

==== 1983 ====
Texas won their fourth national championship in school history by defeating Alabama 3–2 in the championship game. Notable players on the team include Billy Bates, Mike Brumley, Mike Capel, Roger Clemens, Jeff Hearron, Bruce Ruffin, Calvin Schiraldi, Kirk Killingsworth and Jose Tolentino.

==== 2002 ====
Texas won their fifth National Championship in school history by defeating South Carolina 12–6 in the championship game. Notable players on the team include Brad Halsey, Omar Quintanilla, and Huston Street.

==== 2005 ====
Texas won their sixth National Championship in school history by defeating Florida 4–2 and 6–2 in the championship round. Notable players on the team include Taylor Teagarden, Drew Stubbs, and David Maroul.

=== Longest game in college-baseball history ===
On May 30, 2009, the Longhorns and Boston College played in the longest game in college-baseball history—a 25-inning game, during the NCAA Division I Baseball Championship regional tournament at Austin, Texas. The Longhorns—who were designated the visiting team despite playing on their home field—won, 3–2. The game lasted seven hours and three minutes.

Saturday, May 30, 2009 6:02 pm (CDT) at UFCU Disch–Falk Field in Austin, Texas
Team	1	2	3	4	5	6	7	8	9	10	11	12	13	14	15	16	17	18	19	20	21	22	23	24	25	R	H	E
Texas Longhorns	0	2	0	0	0	0	0	0	0	0	0	0	0	0	0	0	0	0	0	0	0	0	0	0	1	3	20	3
Boston College Eagles	0	0	0	1	0	1	0	0	0	0	0	0	0	0	0	0	0	0	0	0	0	0	0	0	0	2	8	0
WP: Austin Dicharry (8–2) LP: Mike Dennhardt (5–2); Home runs: TEX: Kevin Keyes (5); BC: None; Attendance: 7,104; Umpires: Phil Benson, Bill Speck, Mark Ditsworth, Darrell Arnold; Notes: Duration: 7:03; Boxscore

== All-time season results ==
When the Overall and Collegiate Records are different, the Collegiate Record is listed in parentheses.

Season	Coach	Overall	Conference	Standing	Postseason	Coaches' poll	CB poll
No Coach (SIAA) (1895)
1895	No Coach	No Records					
H.B. Beck (SIAA) (1895)
1896	H.B. Beck	No Records					
H.B. Beck:		No Record					
F. Weikart (SIAA) (1897)
1897	F. Weikart	6–5 (3–0)					
F. Weikart:		6–5 (3–0)					
A.C. Ellis (SIAA) (1898–1899)
1898	A. C. Ellis	1–4 (1–0)					
1899	A. C. Ellis	11–1–1 (8–0–1)					
Maurice Gordon Clarke (SIAA) (1900)
1900	Maurice Gordon Clarke	14–2–1 (7–2–1)		1st			
Maurice Gordon Clarke:		14–2–1 (7–2–1)					
A.C. Ellis (SIAA) (1901–1903)
1901	A. C. Ellis	11–2 (10–2)					
1902	A. C. Ellis	13–3–1 (13–2–1)					
1903	A. C. Ellis	12–7 (6–4)					
Ralph Hutchinson (SIAA) (1904–1906)
1904	Ralph Hutchinson	18–10–1 (16–6–1)					
1905	Ralph Hutchinson	17–8 (13–5)		1st			
1906	Ralph Hutchinson	10–9 (8–7)					
Ralph Hutchinson:		45–27–1 (37–18–1)					
H. R. Schenker (SIAA) (1907)
1907	H. R. Schenker	16–8 (15–6)		1st			
H. R. Schenker:		16–8 (15–6)					
Brooks Gordon (SIAA) (1908)
1908	Brooks Gordon	16–12–1 (14–8–1)		1st			
Brooks Gordon:		16–12–1 (14–8–1)					
A.C. Ellis (SIAA) (1909)
1909	A. C. Ellis	13–14 (12–8)					
A.C. Ellis:		61–31–2 (50–16–2)					
Charles A. Keith (SIAA) (1910)
1910	C. A. Keith	8–11–1 (7–9)					
Charles A. Keith:		8–11–1 (7–9)					
Billy Disch (SIAA) (1911–1912)
1911	Billy Disch	13–12–1 (13–10–1)					
1912	Billy Disch	17–10–1 (17–7–1)					
Billy Disch (TIAA) (1913–1914)
1913	Billy Disch	26–4–2 (24–4–2)		1st			
1914	Billy Disch	30–5 (28–4)		1st			
Billy Disch (SWC) (1915)
1915	Billy Disch	25–5 (22–4)	12–2	1st			
1916	Billy Disch	16–7 (16–6)	10–3	1st			
1917	Billy Disch	12–3 (12–2)	4–1	1st			
1918	Billy Disch	17–4 (17–1)	8–1	1st			
1919	Billy Disch	22–3–1 (20–1–1)	12–0	1st			
1920	Billy Disch	18–7–1 (17–5)	9–2	1st			
1921	Billy Disch	15–5–1 (15–3–1)	9–2–1	1st			
1922	Billy Disch	16–6–2 (16–5–1)	10–3–1	1st			
1923	Billy Disch	20–8 (16–8)	10–8	3rd			
1924	Billy Disch	29–1 (28–1)	22–1	1st			
1925	Billy Disch	18–7–1 (16–4–1)	11–2–1	1st			
1926	Billy Disch	13–3 (13–2)	8–2	1st			
1927	Billy Disch	16–6–1 (16–4)	16–4	1st			
1928	Billy Disch	17–6 (17–4)	16–4	1st			
1929	Billy Disch	18–7–1 (18–4–1)	16–4–1	1st			
1930	Billy Disch	20–8 (20–4)	16–4	1st			
1931	Billy Disch	12–6 (10–2)	8–2	2nd			
1932	Billy Disch	12–8 (11–5)	11–5	1st			
1933	Billy Disch	17–5 (13–3)	8–2	2nd			
1934	Billy Disch	13–8 (8–5)	7–5	2nd			
1935	Billy Disch	19–5 (11–3)	9–3	1st			
1936	Billy Disch	18–4 (12–2)	12–1	1st			
1937	Billy Disch	13–11 (11–6)	10–5	2nd			
1938	Billy Disch	13–10 (12–4)	12–2	1st			
1939	Billy Disch	18–6 (16–2)	15–0	1st			
Billy Disch:		513–180–12 (465–115–9)	SWC: 281–68–4				
Bibb Falk (SWC) (1940–1942)
1940	Bibb Falk	20–4 (15–4)	14–1	1st			
1941	Bibb Falk	16–7 (14–3)	12–3	1st			
1942	Bibb Falk	13–6 (11–4)	9–4	2nd			
Blair Cherry (SWC) (1943–1945)
1943	Blair Cherry	10–7 (6–2)	6–2	1st			
1944	Blair Cherry	8–10 (7–3)	—	(Note: The Southwest Conference did not crown a champion in 1944 due to war conditions.)			
1945	Blair Cherry	12–6 (11–1)	10–1	1st			
Blair Cherry:		30–23 (24–6)	SWC: 22–4				
Bibb Falk (SWC) (1946–1967)
1946	Bibb Falk	20–4 (19–2)	14–0	1st			
1947	Bibb Falk	20–4 (19–2)	14–1	1st	Western playoff Finals		
1948	Bibb Falk	20–2 (18–1)	13–1	1st			
1949	Bibb Falk	23–7 (22–4)	12–3	1st	NCAA champions		
1950	Bibb Falk	27–6 (24–4)	14–1	1st	NCAA champions		
1951	Bibb Falk	17–6 (15–4)	11–4	1st			
1952	Bibb Falk	19–9	11–4	1st	College World Series		
1953	Bibb Falk	25–7–1 (24–7–1)	12–3–1	1st	College World Series Runner-Up		
1954	Bibb Falk	17–7–2 (15–7–2)	10–2–1	1st	District 6		
1955	Bibb Falk	10–13–1	7–8–1	3rd			
1956	Bibb Falk	5–15 (5–13)	3–11	6th			
1957	Bibb Falk	20–7 (19–5)	12–1	1st	College World Series		
1958	Bibb Falk	21–8 (18–7)	13–2	1st	District 6		
1959	Bibb Falk	15–7 (13–7)	9–5	2nd			
1960	Bibb Falk	21–3 (19–3)	13–2	1st	District 6		11
1961	Bibb Falk	22–6–2 (20–5–2)	11–3–2	1st	College World Series		8
1962	Bibb Falk	26–7 (22–7)	12–2	1st	College World Series 3rd Place		3
1963	Bibb Falk	24–7–1 (21–7–1)	12–3	1st	College World Series Semifinals		3
1964	Bibb Falk	16–7–1	10–5–1	3rd			12
1965	Bibb Falk	20–7 (18–7)	11–4	1st	College World Series		8
1966	Bibb Falk	24–9–2 (21–9–2)	9–6	1st	College World Series		6
1967	Bibb Falk	17–11	10–5	1st	District 6		17
Bibb Falk:		478–176–10 (434–152–10)	SWC: 278–84–6				
Cliff Gustafson (SWC) (1968–1996)
1968	Cliff Gustafson	23–11	12–4	1st	College World Series		6
1969	Cliff Gustafson	40–6 (35–6)	14–2	1st	College World Series Semifinals		4
1970	Cliff Gustafson	45–8 (39–8)	14–1	1st	College World Series 3rd Place		3
1971	Cliff Gustafson	35–11 (33–11)	15–3	1st	District 6		17
1972	Cliff Gustafson	50–9 (40–9)	12–6	1st	College World Series Semifinals		4
1973	Cliff Gustafson	50–7	15–3	1st	College World Series Semifinals		4
1974	Cliff Gustafson	54–8	20–4	1st	College World Series Semifinals		4
1975	Cliff Gustafson	59–6 (56–6)	23–1	1st	NCAA champions		1
1976	Cliff Gustafson	48–16 (42–16)	19–5	1st	South Central Regional Finals		9
1977	Cliff Gustafson	53–10 (53–9)	17–7	2nd			18
1978	Cliff Gustafson	36–17 (36–16)	12–12	5th			
1979	Cliff Gustafson	61–8 (55–8)	22–2	1st	College World Series Semifinals		4
1980	Cliff Gustafson	53–13	18–6	1st	Central Regional Finals		11
1981	Cliff Gustafson	62–11–1 (61–11–1)	16–5	1st	College World Series 3rd Place		3
1982	Cliff Gustafson	59–7 (59–6)	12–4	1st	College World Series Semifinals		4
1983	Cliff Gustafson	66–14	18–3	1st	NCAA champions		1
1984	Cliff Gustafson	60–14	16–5	1st	College World Series Runner-Up		2
1985	Cliff Gustafson	64–14	16–5	1st	College World Series Runner-Up		2
1986	Cliff Gustafson	51–14	16–5	1st	Central Regional		16
1987	Cliff Gustafson	61–11	18–3	1st	College World Series 3rd Place		3
1988	Cliff Gustafson	58–11–1	18–2–1	1st	Central Regional Finals		10
1989	Cliff Gustafson	54–18	14–7	3rd	College World Series Runner-Up		2
1990	Cliff Gustafson	51–17	15–5	2nd	Central Regional Finals		13
1991	Cliff Gustafson	48–19 (48–18)	14–7	1st	Central Regional semifinals		11
1992	Cliff Gustafson	48–17	28–8	1st	College World Series Semifinals	4	4
1993	Cliff Gustafson	51–16	11–7	4th	College World Series 2nd Round	6	7
1994	Cliff Gustafson	43–21	9–9	4th	Central Regional Finals	15	14
1995	Cliff Gustafson	44–19	14–10	4th	Midwest II Regional semifinals	23	21
1996	Cliff Gustafson	39–24	17–7	1st	Central I Regional 3rd Round	16	18
Cliff Gustafson:		1466–377–2 (1427–373–2)	SWC: 465–152–1				
Augie Garrido (Big 12) (1997–2016)
1997	Augie Garrido	29–22	12–15	7th			
1998	Augie Garrido	23–32–1	11–18	8th			
1999	Augie Garrido	36–26	17–13	6th	Houston Regional		
2000	Augie Garrido	46–21	19–10	4th	College World Series	7	10
2001	Augie Garrido	36–26	19–11	3rd	Palo Alto Regional Finals	28	
2002	Augie Garrido	57–15	19–8	1st	NCAA champions	1	1
2003	Augie Garrido	50–21 (50–20)	19–8	3rd	College World Series 3rd Place	4	4
2004	Augie Garrido	58–15	19–7	1st	College World Series Runner-Up	2	2
2005	Augie Garrido	56–16	16–10	3rd	NCAA champions	1	1
2006	Augie Garrido	41–21	19–7	1st	Austin Regional	17	12
2007	Augie Garrido	46–17	21–6	1st	Round Rock Regional Finals	17	11
2008	Augie Garrido	39–22	15–12	5th	Houston Regional Finals	21	25
2009	Augie Garrido	50–16–1	17–9–1	1st	College World Series Runner-Up	2	2
2010	Augie Garrido	50–13	24–3	1st	Austin Super Regional	9	9
2011	Augie Garrido	49–19	19–8	1st	College World Series	7	7
2012	Augie Garrido	30–22	14–10	3rd			
2013	Augie Garrido	27–24	7–17	9th			
2014	Augie Garrido	46–21	13–11	5th	College World Series 3rd Place	3	3
2015	Augie Garrido	30–27	11–13	5th	Dallas Regional		
2016	Augie Garrido	25–32	10–14	7th			
Augie Garrido:		824–428–2 (824–427–2)	Big 12: 323–208–1				
David Pierce (Big 12) (2017–2024)
2017	David Pierce	39–24	11–12	6th	Long Beach Regional Finals	25	28
2018	David Pierce	42–23	17–7	1st	College World Series	7	7
2019	David Pierce	27–27	7–16	9th			
2020	David Pierce	14–3	(Note: Big 12 Play was canceled due to the COVID-19 pandemic.)	(Note: Big 12 Play/Tournament was canceled due to the COVID-19 pandemic.)	(Note: The 2020 NCAA baseball tournament was canceled due to the COVID-19 pandemic.)	22	15
2021	David Pierce	50–17	17–7	1st	College World Series 3rd Place	3	3
2022	David Pierce	47–22	14–10	5th	College World Series	8	7
2023	David Pierce	42–22	15–9	1st	Stanford Super Regional	12	11
2024	David Pierce	36–24	20–10	3rd	College Station Regional		
David Pierce:		297–162 (.647)	Big 12: 101–71 (.587)				
Jim Schlossnagle (SEC) (2025–present)
2025	Jim Schlossnagle	44–14	22–8	1st	Austin Regional		
Jim Schlossnagle:		44-14 (.759)	SEC: 22–8 (.733)				
Total:		Overall: 3797–1445–32 (.723); Collegiate: 3627–1297–28 (.735)					
National champions College World Series participants Conference regular-season champion Conference regular-season and conference tournament champion Division regular-season champion Division regular-season and conference tournament champion Conference tournament champion

== All-time series records ==
=== SEC members ===
*Updated: February 15, 2025.
Information Source: 2018 Texas Longhorns Baseball Media Guide – All-Time Series Records section
2018 Season Results
2019 Season Results

Opponent	Meeting		Series			Home			Away			Neutral			Postseason			Conference Tournament			NCAA tournament		
	First	Latest	W	L	T	W	L	T	W	L	T	W	L	T	W	L	T	W	L	T	W	L	T
Alabama	1899	2022	11	1	0	4	0	0	5	1	0	2	0	0	2	0	0	0	0	0	2	0	0
Arkansas	1902	2023	76	39	0	43	15	0	24	18	1	9	6	0	21	7	0	16	4	0	5	3	0
Auburn	1912	1995	0	2	1	0	1	1	0	0	0	0	1	0	0	1	0	0	0	0	0	1	0
Florida	2005	2018	2	2	0	1	0	0	0	0	0	2	2	0	2	2	0	0	0	0	2	2	0
Georgia	1912	2004	3	1	0	0	0	0	1	1	0	2	0	0	2	0	0	0	0	0	2	0	0
Kentucky	1993	1993	1	0	0	1	0	0	0	0	0	0	0	0	1	0	0	0	0	0	1	0	0
LSU	1899	2025	30	16	1	19	4	1	7	7	0	3	5	0	2	3	0	0	0	0	2	3	0
Mississippi State	1922	2025	7	7	0	2	3	0	2	1	0	3	3	0	5	3	0	0	0	0	5	3	0
Missouri	1905	2023	37	29	0	18	8	0	16	12	0	3	9	0	2	6	0	2	5	0	0	1	0
Oklahoma	1910	2024	158	69	2	107	42	2	35	20	0	16	7	0	18	7	0	7	2	0	11	5	0
Ole Miss	1900	2025	15	6	0	2	0	0	10	5	0	3	1	0	4	1	0	0	0	0	4	1	0
South Carolina	1975	2022	7	2	0	3	0	0	1	2	0	3	0	0	3	0	0	0	0	0	3	0	0
Tennessee	2008	2022	2	2	0	0	0	0	0	0	0	2	2	0	1	0	0	0	0	0	1	0	0
Texas A&M	1903	2024	245	131	5	132	48	5	100	72	0	13	11	0	18	7	0	15	6	0	3	2	0
Vanderbilt	1900	2024	7	9	0	2	0	0	4	6	0	1	3	0	3	1	0	0	0	0	3	1	0

=== Former Big 12 and SWC members ===
Colorado and Nebraska both competed in the Big 12 from 1997 to 2011. Rice (1915–1996), SMU (1918–1996), and Houston (1971–1996) all competed in the Southwest Conference. Texas departed from the Big 12 after the 2024 season. *Through March 1, 2022.
Information Source: 2018 Texas Longhorns Baseball Media Guide – All-Time Series Records section
2018 Season Results
2019 Season Results

Opponent	Meeting		Series			Home			Away			Neutral			Postseason			Conference Tournament			NCAA tournament		
	First	Latest	W	L	T	W	L	T	W	L	T	W	L	T	W	L	T	W	L	T	W	L	T
Baylor	1903	2024	257	114	4	123	41	1	100	64	3	9	8	0	11	10	0	7	10	0	4	0	0
Houston	1958	2021	97	33	2	56	14	1	36	17	1	5	2	0	17	6	1	7	0	0	10	6	1
Iowa State	1990	2001	8	5	0	4	3	0	4	2	0												
Kansas	1906	2024	63	30	0	36	10	0	24	18	0	3	2	0	3	2	0	3	2	0			
Kansas State	1985	2024	65	25	1	36	12	1	26	12	0	3	1	0	3	1	0	3	1	0			
Nebraska	1954	2015	31	31	0	15	15	0	12	14	0	4	2	0	3	2	0	3	2	0			
Oklahoma State	1913	2025	70	55	0	35	19	0	20	24	0	15	12	0	18	15	0	9	8	0	9	7	0
Rice	1915	2022	235	58	2	129	19	1	102	34	1	4	5	0	6	6	0	3	3	0	3	3	0
SMU	1918	1980	142	23	0	76	10	0	66	13	0												
Texas Tech	1968	2025	122	54	0	64	24	0	53	26	0	8	4	0	9	4	0	9	4	0			
TCU	1897	2024	237	78	2	135	30	0	89	42	2	13	6	0	10	5	0	7	2	0	3	3	0
West Virginia	2013	2022	16	16	0	11	7	0	4	8	0	1	1	0	1	1	0	1	1	0			

== Head coaches ==
There have been 15 head coaches since the inaugural team in 1895. Since 1911 there have been only 7.

No.	Coach	Seasons	Years	Overall record				Collegiate Record				Conference Record			
				W	L	T	%	W	L	T	%	W	L	T	%
	No Coach	1	1895	Incomplete record											
1	H.B. Beck	1	1896	Incomplete record											
2	F. Weikart	1	1897	6	5	0	.545	3	0	0	1.000	-	-	-	-
3	A.C. Ellis	6	1898–99, 1901–03, 1909	61	31	2	.660	50	16	2	.750	-	-	-	-
4	Maurice Gordon Clarke	1	1900	14	2	1	.853	7	2	1	.750	-	-	-	-
5	Ralph Hutchinson	3	1904–1906	45	27	1	.623	37	18	1	.670	-	-	-	-
6	H. R. Schenker	1	1907	16	8	0	.667	15	6	0	.714	-	-	-	-
7	Brooks Gordon	1	1908	16	12	1	.569	14	8	1	.630	-	-	-	-
8	Charles A. Keith	1	1910	8	11	1	.425	7	9	0	.438	-	-	-	-
9	Billy Disch	29	1911–1939	513	180	12	.736	465	115	9	.797	281	68	4	.802
10	Bibb Falk	25	1940–1942, 1946–1967	478	176	10	.727	434	152	10	.737	278	84	6	.764
11	Blair Cherry	3	1943–1945	30	23	0	.566	24	6	0	.800	22	4	0	.846
12	Cliff Gustafson	29	1968–1996	1466	377	2	.795	1427	373	2	.792	465	152	1	.753
13	Augie Garrido	20	1997–2016	824	428	2	.658	824	427	2	.658	323	208	1	.608
14	David Pierce	8	2017–2024	297	162	0	.647	297	162	0	.647	101	71	0	.587
15	Jim Schlossnagle	1	2025–present	44	14	0	.759	44	14	0	.759	22	8	0	.733

Records through 2025 season

== Rivalries ==
The Longhorns have rivalries with the Arkansas Razorbacks, Texas A&M, Oklahoma State, Oklahoma, Texas Tech, and Baylor among others.

=== Baylor ===
Texas's rivalry with Baylor dates back April 4, 1903, when the Longhorns beat the Bears 13–1 in Austin. Since then, the schools have competed in an annual series, alternating between campuses as host.

=== Oklahoma ===
Texas's rivalry with Oklahoma dates back May 9, 1910, when the Longhorns beat the Sooners 3–2 in Austin. Oklahoma was part of the Texas Intercollegiate Athletic Association and later the Big 8 Conference until 1996, when both schools joined the Big 12, playing each other for one series every year from 1940 to 1972. often in the NCAA Division I baseball tournament.

=== Oklahoma State ===
Texas's rivalry with Oklahoma State dates back May 1, 1913, when the Longhorns beat the Cowboys 4–1 in Austin. Oklahoma State, then known as Oklahoma A&M, was part of the Texas Intercollegiate Athletic Association and later the Southwest Conference until 1925. Between 1919 and 1997, when both joined the Big 12, the schools played each other sporadically. When they did compete, it was often in NCAA Division I baseball tournament.

=== Texas A&M ===
The Longhorns rivalry with Texas A&M is part of the Lone Star Showdown. The baseball rivalry dates back to April 24, 1903, when the Longhorns defeated the Aggies 6–2 in College Station. The Longhorns and Aggies combined to win or share 75 of 81 Southwest Conference regular season championships and 13 of 19 conference tournaments. In Big 12 play, the two schools have shared 10 of 15 regular season titles and 7 of 15 conference tournaments. After the 2012 season, Texas A&M left for the SEC.

=== Texas Tech ===
Texas's rivalry with Texas Tech dates back March 22, 1968, when the Longhorns beat the Red Raiders 7–5 in Lubbock. That was the year Texas Tech joined the Southwest Conference. Since then, the schools have competed each year in a three-game series.

== Individual awards ==
=== National College Baseball Hall of Fame ===
The Longhorns have had eight players, three coaches, and one veteran inducted into the National College Baseball Hall of Fame, more than any other school.

Inductee	Position	Years at Texas	Year Inducted
Cliff Gustafson	Head coach	1968–1996	2006
Brooks Kieschnick	RHP/DH	1991–93	2006
Bibb Falk	Head coach	1940-42, 1946–1967	2007
Billy Disch	Head coach	1911–1939	2008
Greg Swindell	LHP	1984–1986	2008
Burt Hooton	RHP	1969–71	2008
Kirk Dressendorfer	RHP	1988–90	2009
Keith Moreland	IF	1973–75	2009
Richard Wortham	LHP	1973–76	2010
Augie Garrido	Head coach	1997–2016	2016
David Chalk	IF	1969–72	2019
Jim Gideon	RHP	1973–75	2020

=== National awards ===
- Golden Spikes Award

Ivan Melendez – 2022

- Dick Howser Trophy

Scott Bryant – 1989
Freddie Aponte – 1992, 1993
Taylor Jungmann – 2011
Ivan Melendez – 2022

- Collegiate Baseball Newspaper Player of the Year

Greg Swindell — 1986
Scott Bryant – 1989
Brooks Kieschnick – 1993
Ivan Melendez – 2022

- Baseball America Player of the Year

Brooks Kieschnick – 1993
Ivan Melendez – 2022

- ABCA Player of the Year

Scott Bryant – 1989
Freddie Aponte – 1992, 1993
Kody Clemens – 2018
Ivan Melendez – 2022

- D1Baseball Player of the Year

Ivan Melendez – 2022

- NCBWA Stopper of the Year

J. B. Cox – 2005
Chance Ruffin – 2010
Corey Knebel – 2011

- College World Series Most Outstanding Player

Tom Hamilton – 1949
J. L. Smith – 1953
Mickey Reichenbach – 1975
Calvin Schiraldi – 1983
Huston Street – 2002
David Maroul – 2005

- Baseball America Freshman of the Year

Greg Swindell – 1984
Kirk Dressendorfer – 1988
Brooks Kieschnick – 1991

- NCBWA Freshman Pitcher of the Year

Corey Knebel – 2011

- Collegiate Baseball Newspaper Freshman Pitcher of the Year

Corey Knebel – 2011

- ABCA/Rawlings Gold Glove

Brooks Marlow – 2014

- Bobby Bragan Collegiate Slugger Award

Ivan Melendez – 2022

- Baseball America Coach of the Year

Augie Garrido – 2002
David Pierce – 2018

- Collegiate Baseball Newspaper Coach of the Year

Cliff Gustafson – 1983
Augie Garrido – 2002, 2005

==== First Team All-Americans ====
The University of Texas has had 57 players named to first team All-American and more than 20 players to the first team Freshman All-American team.

1932

Ray Ater (SS)
Ernie Koy (OF)

1933

Pat Ankenman (SS)

1949

Murray Wall (P)
Tom Hamilton (OF)

1950

Murray Wall (P)

1961

Chuck Knutson (OF)

1962

Pat Rigby (2B)

1963

Bill Bethea (SS)
Butch Thompson (1B)

1969

Burt Hooton (P)

1970

Burt Hooton (P)
Tommy Harmon (C)

1971

Burt Hooton (P)
Dave Chalk (3B)

1972

Dave Chalk (3B)

1973

Keith Moreland (3B)
Ron Roznovsky (P)

1974

Keith Moreland (3B)
Jim Gideon (P)
David Reeves (OF)

1975

Keith Moreland (3B)
Jim Gideon (P)

1976

Richard Wortham (P)

1979

Jerry Don Gleaton (P)

1981

Tony Arnold (P)

1982

Spike Owen (SS)

1983

Calvin Schiraldi (P)

1984

David Denny (3B)
Billy Bates (2B)
Greg Swindell (P)

1985

Billy Bates (2B)
Greg Swindell (P)

1986

Greg Swindell (P)

1987

Curt Krippner (P)
Kevin Garner (OF/P)

1988

Brian Johnson (C)
Kirk Dressendorfer (P)

1989

Scott Bryant (DH)
Kirk Dressendorfer (P)

1990

Freddie Aponte (3B)

1991

Brooks Kieschnick (UT/P/DH)

1992

Brooks Kieschnick (UT/P/DH)
Calvin Murray (OF)

1993

Brooks Kieschnick (UT/P/DH)

2000

Charlie Thames (P)

2002

Justin Simmons (P)

2003

Dustin Majewski (OF)

2004

J. P. Howell (P)
Huston Street (P)

2005

J. B. Cox (P)
Seth Johnston (SS)

2007

Kyle Russell (OF)

2010

Cole Green (P)
Chance Ruffin (P)

2011

Taylor Jungmann (P)
Corey Knebel (RP)

2018

Kody Clemens (2B)

2021

Ty Madden (P)
Tanner Witt (P)
Pete Hansen (P)

2022

Ivan Melendez (1B)

==== All College World Series ====
Over 45 players have been named to the All College World Series team.

1962

Tom Belcher, P
Pat Rigby, 2B

1968

Lou Bagwell, 2B

1969

Burt Hooton, P
Lou Bagwell, 2B

1970

Tom Harmon, C
John Langerhans, 1B
Mike Markl, OF

1972

Dave Chalk, 3B

1973

Keith Moreland, 3B
Terry Pyka, OF

1974

Tom Ball, OF

1975

Richard Wortham, P
Mickey Reichenbach, 1B
Blair Stouffer, SS
Rick Bradley, OF

1979

Joe Bruno, OF
Keith Walker, DH

1981

Burk Goldthorn, C

1982

Spike Owen, SS
Mike Brumley, OF

1983

Jeff Hearron, C
Bill Bates, 2B
Mike Brumley, SS
Calvin Schiraldi, P

1985

Bill Bates, 2B
Dennis Cook, P
Greg Swindell, P

1989

David Lowery, 2B
Craig Newkirk, 3B
Arthur Butcher, OF
Scott Bryant, OF

2002

Tim Moss, 2B
Omar Quintanilla, 3B
Dustin Majewski, OF
Justin Simmons, P
Huston Street, P

2003

Curtis Thigpen, 1B

2004

Seth Johnston, 2B

2005

J. B. Cox, P
Will Crouch, DH
Seth Johnston, SS
David Maroul, 3B
Kyle McCulloch, P
Taylor Teagarden, C

2009

Taylor Jungmann, P
Russell Moldenhauer, OF
Cameron Rupp, C

2021

Ivan Melendez, DH

=== Conference awards ===
==== Southwest Conference ====
- Southwest Conference Player of the Year

Greg Swindell – 1986
Brian Cisarik – 1987
Kirk Dressendorfer – 1988, 1989, 1990
Brooks Kieschnick – 1991, 1992, 1993
Danny Peoples – 1996

- Southwest Conference Tournament Most Outstanding Player

Keith Creel – 1979
Burk Goldthorn – 1981
José Tolentino – 1983
Brian Cisarik – 1988
Charles Abernathy – 1991
Calvin Murray – 1992
Brooks Kieschnick – 1993
Ryan Kjos – 1994

===== First Team All Southwest Conference =====
From 1922 until the conference dissolved in 1996, 352 Longhorns were named first team all Southwest Conference.

1922

George Johnson, OF
Rube Leissner, OF
Jim Nowlin, 2B
Heinie Odom, SS
Manny Ponsford, P

1923

Ed Carson, 1B
Rube Leissner, OF
Heinie Odom, SS

1924

Ed Carson, 1B
Otto Clements, P
Ox Eckhardt, P
Hod Kibbie, 2B
A.L. Leissner, C
Heinie Odom, SS
M.E. Ponsford, P
Clyde Pratt, OF

1925

Otto Clements, P
Hod Kibbie, 2B
Dewey Smalley, 3B
Fred Thompson, OF
Howie Williamson, OF

1926

Potsy Allen, C
Neal Baker, P
Ed Olle, 3B
Fred Thompson, OF
Howie Williamson, OF

1927

Potsy Allen, C
Neal Baker, P
Heine Baumgarten, OF
R.P. Harris, SS
Marty Hopkins, 2B
Ed Olle, 3B

1928

Potsy Allen, C
Marty Hopkins, 2B
Johnny Railton, P
Arvie Walker, 1B

1929

Pinky Higgins, OF
Marty Hopkins, 2B
Tom Hughes, OF
Johnny Railton, P
Arvie Walker, 1B

1930

Raymond Ater, SS
Pinky Higgins, 2B
Johnny Railton, P
Minton White, OF

1931

Raymond Ater, SS
M.J. de la Fuente, P
Ernie Koy, OF
Minton White, 2B

1932

Raymond Ater, SS
Ernie Koy, OF
Vernon Taylor, P

1933

Pat Ankenman, SS
Ernie Koy, OF
Rabbit McDowell, 2B
Vernon Taylor, P
Van Viebig, 3B

1934

Pat Ankenman, SS
Bohn Hilliard, OF
Rabbit McDowell, 2B
Van Viebig, 3B

1935

Norm Branch, P
Joe Fitzsimmons, C
Aubrey Graham, 3B
Bohn Hilliard, OF
Lloyd Rigby, SS

1936

Norm Branch, P
Aubrey Graham, 2B
Dick Midkiff, P
John Munro, 1B
Mel Preibisch, OF
Morris Sands, OF

1937

Tex Hughson, P
John Munro, 1B
Lloyd Rigby, 3B

1938

Jack Conway, SS
John Garnett, P
Johnny Hill, 1B
Joyce Rawe, C
Leroy Westerman, OF

1939

Jack Conway, SS
Mel Deutsch, P
Bob Evans, 2B
Charles Haas, OF
Johnny Hill, 1B
Bobby Moers, 3B
Clarence Pfeil, OF

1940

Melvin Deutsch, P
Fred Everett, C
Charles Haas, OF
Johnny Hill, 1B
Bobby Moers, 3B
Clarence Pfeil, OF
Jack Stone, 2B

1941

Alton Bostick, C
Melvin Deutsch, P
Grady Hatton, 3B
Pete Layden, OF
Udell Moore, P
Robert Smith, UT
Jack Stone, 2B

1942

Bill Dumke, P
Grady Hatton, SS
Jack O'Reagan, C
Jack Stone, 2B

1943

Bob Campbell, OF
Jim Collins, P
Clint Grell, OF
Grady Hatton, 3B
Tex Travis, C

1944

Jack Avinger, C
Bob Campbell, OF
Maurice Connor, SS
Billy Cox, 1B
Bobby Layne, P
Zeke Wilemon, OF

1945

Leroy Anderson, UT
Bob Horneyer, 3B
Jack Lindsey, SS
Tom Milik, C
Zeke Wilemon, OF
Don Wooten, OF

1946

Bob Ferguson, OF
Ransom Jackson, 3B
Bobby Layne, P
Jack O'Reagan, C
Ruben Ortega, UT
Hobbs Williams, OF
Chick Zomlefer, SS

1947

Ransom Jackson, 3B
Bobby Layne, P
Dan Watson, C
Hobbs Williams, OF
Chick Zomlefer, SS

1948

Charlie Gorin, P
Tom Hamilton, 1B
Al Joe Hunt, 3B
Bobby Layne, P
Dan Watson, C
Chick Zomlefer, SS

1949

Tom Hamilton, 1B
Ed Kneuper, OF
Murray Wall, P
Dan Watson, C
Jim Shamblin, UT

1950

Charlie Gorin, P
Kal Segrist, 2B
Ben Tomkins, 3B
Murray Wall, P
Frank Womack, OF

1951

Chile Bigham, 1B
Eddie Burrows, 2B
Jim Ehrler, P
Frank Womack, OF

1952

Jimmy Don Pace, 3B
Luther Scarbrough, P
Joe Tanner, SS

1953

Randy Biesenbach, C
Travis Eckert, OF
Boyd Linker, P
Paul Mohr, 1B
Tommy Snow, OF
Ronald Spradlin, C

1954

Travis Eckert, OF
Boyd Linker, P
Paul Mohr, 1B
Tommy Snow, OF
Bob Towery, 2B

1955

Stuart Benson, C
Tommy Jungman, P

1956

Jerry Good, 3B

1957

Jerry Good, 1B
Johnny Lowry, SS
Bill Moore, OF
George Myers, OF
Howie Reed, P
Harry Taylor, P
Woody Woodman, IF

1958

Max Alvis, 3B
Wayne McDonald, OF
Roy Menge, OF
George Myers, P
Woody Woodman, 2B

1959

Pete Embry, C
Wayne McDonald, OF
George Myers, OF
Elmer Rod, P

1960

Jay Arnette, OF
Tom Belcher, P
Bob Callaway, P
Wayne McDonald, OF
Roy Menge, OF
Bart Shirley, SS

1961

Tom Belcher, P
Bob Callaway, P
Chuck Knutson, OF
Pat Rigby, 3B

1962

Pat Rigby, 2B
Tom Belcher, P
Ed Kasper, 3B
Chuck Knutson, OF
Gary London, C

1963

Bill Bethea, SS
Chuck Knutson, OF
Gary London, C
Bob Myer, P
Butch Thompson, 1B

1964

Bob Myer, P
Ward Summers, OF

1965

Forrest Boyd, SS
John Collier, P
Joe Hague, OF
Gary Moore, OF
James Schlechuk, C

1966

Gary Moore, P/OF

1967

Pat Brown, OF
Don Johnson, 2B
Tommy Moore, P
Bob Snoddy, 1B

1968

Pat Brown, OF
James Street, P

1969

Lou Bagwell, IF
Pat Brown, OF
Dave Chalk, OF
David Hall, 3B
Burt Hooton, P
James Street, P

1970

Lou Bagwell, SS
Dave Chalk, 3B
David Hall, OF
Burt Hooton, P
John Langerhans, 1B
Jack Miller, OF
James Street, P

1971

Dave Chalk, 3B
Burt Hooton, P
John Langerhans, 1B
Mike Markl, 2B
Walt Rothe, OF

1972

Bill Berryhill, C
Dave Chalk, 3B
Mike Markl, 2B
Ken Pape, OF
Terry Pyka, OF
Ron Roznovsky, P

1973

Bobby Clark, UT
Keith Moreland, 3B
Ron Roznovsky, P
Richard Wortham, P

1974

Rick Bradley, C
Jim Gideon, P
Keith Moreland, UT
Terry Pyka, OF
Blair Stouffer, SS

1975

Rick Bradley, C
Martin Flores, P
Jim Gideon, P
Keith Moreland, 3B
Garry Pyka, 2B
Mickey Reichenbach, 1B

1976

Charles Proske, OF
Garry Pyka, 2B
Mickey Reichenbach, 1B
Richard Wortham, P

1977

Wendell Hibbett, OF
Don Kainer, P

1978

Keith Creel, P

1979

Joe Bruno, OF
Ron Gardenhire, SS
Jerry Don Gleaton, P
Terry Salazar, 1B
Ricky Wright, P

1980

Chris Campbell, 1B
Keith Creel, P
Dean David, 2B
Ricky Nixon, DH
Mike Zatopek, OF

1981

Tony Arnold, P
Robert Culley, 3B
Burk Goldthorn, C
Spike Owen, SS

1982

Mike Brumley, OF
Mike Capel, P
Kirk Killingsworth, P
Spike Owen, SS

1983

Mike Brumley, SS
Kirk Killingsworth, P
Calvin Schiraldi, P
Jose Tolentino, 1B

1984

Bill Bates, 2B
Eric Boudreaux, P
Dennis Cook, OF
David Denny, 3B
Greg Swindell, P

1985

Bill Bates, 2B
Dennis Cook, OF
David Denny, OF
Greg Swindell, P

1986

Scott Coolbaugh, OF
Todd Haney, 2B
Coby Kerlin, SS
Greg Swindell, P

1987

Brian Cisarik, 1B
Todd Haney, 2B
Coby Kerlin, IF
Curt Krippner, P

1988

Scott Bryant, OF
Brian Cisarik, 1B
Rusty Crockett, OF
Kirk Dressendorfer, P
Brian Johnson, C
Mike Patrick, DH
Eric Stone, P

1989

Scott Bryant, DH
Kirk Dressendorfer, P

1990

David Tollison, 2B
Kirk Dressendorfer, P
Scott Pugh, 1B

1991

Clay King, 3B
Shane Halter, SS
Brooks Kieschnick, P/DH

1992

Chris Abbe, C
Charles Abernathy, OF
Robert DeLeon, 2B
Tim Harkrider, SS
Brooks Kieschnick, P/DH
Clay King, 3B
Calvin Murray, OF

1993

Brooks Kieschnick, P/DH
Braxton Hickman, 1B

1994

Tony Vasut, 2B
Ryan Kjos, P
J. D. Smart, P
Stephen Larkin, OF/1B
Jeff Conway, OF
Shea Morenz, OF
Jay Vaught, P
Clint Koppe, P
Wylie Campbell, SS

1995

Kip Harkrider, SS
MacGregor Byers, IF
Shea Morenz, OF
Jake O'Dell, P
J. D. Smart, P

1996

MacGregor Byers, OF
Eric French, P
Kip Harkrider, SS
JoJo Hinojosa, P
Scott Leon, P
Jake O'Dell, P
Danny Peoples, 1B
Trey Salinas, 3B

===== Southwest Conference All Tournament Team =====
From 1981 to 1996, 66 to the first team all Southwest Conference Tournament team.

1981

Burk Goldthorn, C
Tony Arnold, P
Spike Owen, SS
Mike Livermore, 3B
Kirk Killingsworth, OF
Tracy Dophied, OF

1982

Jeff Hearron, C
Randy Day, 1B
Spike Owen, SS
Randy Richards, OF
Mike Brumley, 3B
Roger Clemens, P
Kirk Killingsworth, OF

1983

Calvin Schiraldi, P
Jeff Hearron, C
Bryan Burrows, 2B
Jose Tolentino, 1B

1985

David Wzresinski, OF
Bill Bates, 2B
Greg Swindell, P

1987

Lenny Bell, 1B
Todd Haney, 2B
Scott Coolbaugh, 3B
Coby Kerlin, SS
Brian Cisarik, OF
Curt Krippner, P
Mark Petkovsek, P

1988

Brian Johnson, C
Brian Cisarik, OF
Joel Chimelis, SS
Mike Patrick, C
Kirk Dressendorfer, P
Preston Watson, P

1989

Clay King, 3B
David Tollison, 1B
Arthur Butcher, OF
Scott Bryant, OF
Kirk Dressendorfer, P

1990

David Tollison, 2B
Lance Jones, OF
Chris Gaskill, P
Kirk Dressendorfer, P

1991

Roger Luce, C
Clay King, 3B
Scott Pugh, UT
Charles Abernathy, OF
Tim Belk, OF
Brooks Kieschnick, P

1993

Braxton Hickman, 1B
Tim Harkrider, SS
Mark Prather, OF
Brooks Kieschnick, DH/P

1994

Stephen Larkin, 1B
Shea Morenz, OF
Jay Vaught, P
Ryan Kjos, P

1995

Roman Escamilla, C
Jake O'Dell, P

1996

Jake O'Dell, P
Clint Kiemsteadt, OF

==== Big 12 Conference ====
- Big 12 Conference Player of the Year

Drew Stubbs – 2006
Kyle Russell – 2007
Kody Clemens – 2018
Ivan Melendez – 2022
Max Belyeu – 2024

- Big 12 Conference Pitcher of the Year

Justin Simmons – 2002
J.P. Howell – 2004
Kyle McCulloch – 2006
Adrian Alaniz – 2007
Cole Green – 2010
Taylor Jungmann – 2011
Ty Madden – 2021

- Big 12 Conference Tournament Most Outstanding Player

Dustin Majewski – 2002, 2003
Brandon Belt – 2008
Brandon Loy – 2009
Zane Gurwitz – 2015

- Big 12 Conference Newcomer/Freshman Pitcher of the Year

Charlie Thames – 2000
Gerrit Simpson & Justin Simmons – 2001
Huston Street – 2002
Chance Ruffin – 2008
Parker French – 2012

- Big 12 Conference Newcomer/Freshman Player of the Year

Omar Quintanilla – 2001
J. D. Reininger – 2002
Taylor Teagarden – 2003
Drew Stubbs – 2004
Erich Weiss – 2011

- Big 12 Conference Manager of the Year

Augie Garrido – 2002, 2006, 2007, 2010, 2011
David Pierce - 2018, 2021

===== First Team All Big 12 Conference =====
Since joining the Big 12 for the 1997 season, 58 Longhorns have been named a first team all-conference selection.

2000

Ben Edmond, OF
Beau Hale, SP
Tommy Nicholson, 2B
Charlie Thames, RP
Todd West, SS

2001

Omar Quintanilla, SS
Gerrit Simpson, SP

2002

Tim Moss, 2B
Justin Simmons, SP
Huston Street, RP

2003

J. P. Howell, SP
Dustin Majewski, OF
Omar Quintanilla, SS
Huston Street, RP

2004

J. Brent Cox, RP
J. P. Howell, SP
Carson Kainer, OF
Huston Street, P
Drew Stubbs, OF
Curtis Thigpen, C/1B

2005

J. Brent Cox, RP
Seth Johnston, IF
Kyle McCulloch, SP
Drew Stubbs, OF
Taylor Teagarden, C

2006

Hunter Harris, DH
Kyle McCulloch, SP
Drew Stubbs, OF
Chance Wheeless, 1B

2007

Adrian Alaniz, SP
Preston Clark, C
Kyle Russell, OF
Bradley Suttle, 3B
Chance Wheeless, 1B

2009

Chance Ruffin, SP
Austin Wood, RP

2010

Cole Green, SP
Russell Moldenhauer, DH
Chance Ruffin, RP
Cameron Rupp, C
Brandon Workman, SP

2011

Brandon Loy, SS
Erich Weiss, 3B
Taylor Jungmann, P
Corey Knebel, P

2012

Erich Weiss, 3B
Corey Knebel, P

2018

Kody Clemens, 2B
Duke Ellis, OF
Zach Zubia, DH

2021

Mitchell Daly, 2B
Ivan Melendez, DH
Ty Madden, P
Tristan Stevens, P

2022

Silas Ardoin, C
Ivan Melendez, 1B
Murphy Stehly, OF
Pete Hansen, P

2024

Jalin Flores, SS
Max Belyeu, OF
Gage Boehm, P

===== Big 12 Conference All Tournament Team =====
Since 1997, over 30 players have been named to the all tournament team.

2000

Beau Hale, P
Ryan Hubele, C

2002

Jeff Ontiveros, 1B
Dustin Majewski, OF
J. D. Reininger, DH
Ray Clark, P
Huston Street, P

2003

Joe Ferin, OF
Seth Johnston, DH
Dustin Majewski, OF
Tim Moss, 2B
Omar Quintanilla, SS
Huston Street, P

2004

Curtis Thigpen, 1B

2005

Randy Boone, P
Seth Johnston, SS
Nick Peoples, OF

2006

Hunter Harris, DH
Kenn Kasparek, P
Drew Stubbs, OF

2007

Chance Wheeless, 1B
Jordan Danks, OF

2008

Brandon Belt, 1B
Jordan Danks, OF
Russell Moldenhauer, OF

2009

Brandon Belt, 1B
Brandon Loy, SS
Chance Ruffin, P

2010

Connor Rowe, OF

2011

Brandon Loy, 3B
Paul Montalbano, OF
Taylor Jungmann, P

2014

Mark Payton, OF

2015

Tres Barrera, C
Brooks Marlow, 2B
Bret Boswell, 3B
Zane Gurwitz, OF
Joe Baker, DH
Parker French, SP
Connor Mayes, SP

2016

Kacy Clemens, 1B
Bret Boswell, SS

2017

Kacy Clemens, 1B
David Hamilton, SS

2021

Zach Zubia, 1B

2022

Douglas Hodo III, OF
Pete Hansen, SP
Skyler Messinger, 3B

== No-hitters ==
Throughout the history of the program, Texas pitchers have combined to throw 21 no-hitters, including one perfect game.

On April 3, 1970 James Street shutout Texas Tech 4–0 over seven innings in Lubbock, TX to secure the first and only perfect game in Longhorn's history. This was also the only perfect game in the history of the Southwest Conference.

#	Date	Pitcher	Score	Opponent	Stadium	City	IP	H	R	ER	BB	SO	Notes
1	March 26, 1946	Bobby Layne	7-0	Southwestern	Clark Field	Austin, TX	9	0	0	0	4	16	
2	May 4, 1946	Bobby Layne	2-1	Texas A&M		College Station, TX	9	0	1	0	2	14	
3	June 19, 1950	Jim Ehrler	7-0	Tufts	Rosenblatt Stadium	Omaha, NE	9	0	0	0	5	14	First no-hitter in CWS History
4	April 29, 1955	Tommy Jungman	8-0	Rice	Clark Field	Austin, TX	9	0	0	0	2	6	
5	March 28, 1969	James Street	5-0	SMU		Dallas, TX	7	0	0	0	1	8	
6	April 3, 1970	James Street	4-0	Texas Tech		Lubbock, TX	7	0	0	0	0	8	Perfect Game
7	February 26, 1971	Burt Hooton	8-0	Sam Houston State	Clark Field	Austin, TX	7	0	0	0	0	8	2 Errors by Texas
*	March 19, 1971	Burt Hooton	1-0	Texas Tech	Clark Field	Austin, TX	13	1	0	0	0	19	Perfect Game for 8 innings of a scheduled 7-inning game
8	February 27, 1973	Ron Roznovsky	4-1	Texas Lutheran	Clark Field	Austin, TX	9	0	1	1	6	13	
9	April 7, 1973	Rich Wortham	9-0	Texas Tech	Clark Field	Austin, TX	9	0	0	0	6	10	
10	March 21, 1975	Jim Gideon	6-0	SMU		Dallas, TX	9	0	0	0	1	11	
11	March 31, 1979	Ricky Wright	7-0	Rice	Disch-Falk Field	Austin, TX	7	0	0	0	2	9	
12	March 22, 1980	Dave Seiler	1-0	SMU	Disch-Falk Field	Austin, TX	9	0	0	0	8	3	
13	March 17, 1984	Greg Swindell	12-0	Texas Wesleyan	Disch-Falk Field	Austin, TX	7	0	0	0	1	8	
14	March 16, 1985	Greg Swindell	4-0	Oklahoma City	Disch-Falk Field	Austin, TX	7	0	0	0	2	14	
15	February 16, 1986	Kevin Garner	13-0	UT-Arlington	Disch-Falk Field	Austin, TX	7	0	0	0	5	7	
16	March 3, 1987	Mark Petkovsek	2-1	Southwestern	Disch-Falk Field	Austin, TX	7	0	1	1	3	5	
17	February 11, 2000	Beau Hale	10-0	Sam Houston State	Disch-Falk Field	Austin, TX	9	0	0	0	1	13	
18	April 16, 2005	Adrian Alaniz	4-0	Oklahoma	Disch-Falk Field	Austin, TX	9	0	0	0	1	6	
19	April 29, 2008	Kenn Kasparek	11-0	Texas State	Disch-Falk Field	Austin, TX	9	0	0	0	0	9	HBP in 7th
20	March 1, 2009	Brandon Workman	9-0	Penn State	Disch-Falk Field	Austin, TX	9	0	0	0	2	10	
21	May 19, 2014	Dillon Peters	12-0	Kansas State	Tointon Stadium	Manhattan, KS	7	0	0	0	3	8	Combined No-Hitter
21	May 19, 2014	Morgan Cooper	12-0	Kansas State	Tointon Stadium	Manhattan, KS	2	0	0	0	1	1	Combined No-Hitter

Friday, April 3, 1970 at Lubbock, TX
Team	1	2	3	4	5	6	7	R	H	E
Texas Longhorns	0	1	0	0	0	2	1	4	8	0
Texas Tech Red Raiders	0	0	0	0	0	0	0	0	0	2
WP: James Street LP: Notes: 1st and only Perfect Game in the history of the Texas Longhorns and the Southwest Conference

== Retired numbers ==
Texas has seven retired numbers from nine different players.

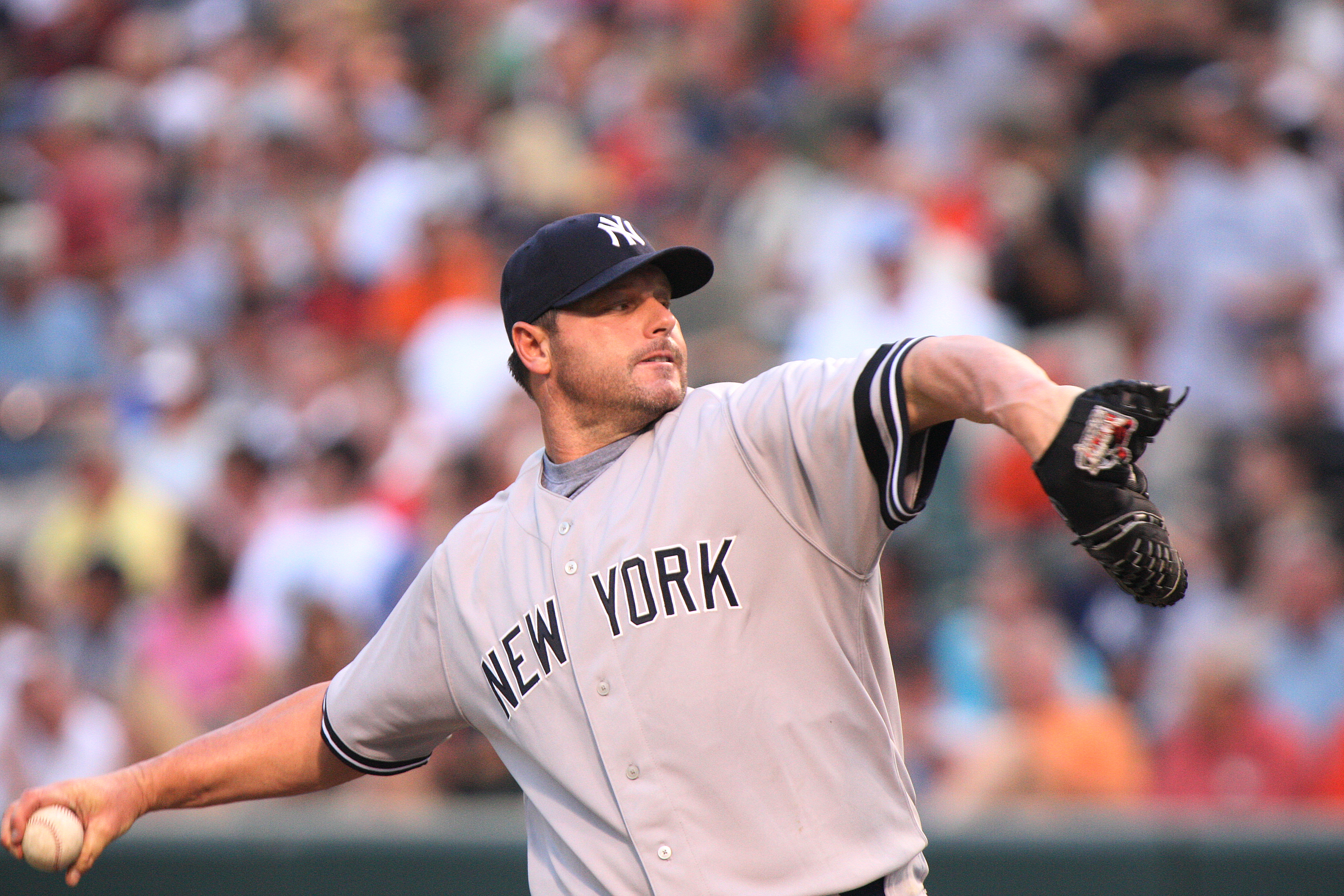
Roger Clemens, 1983 College World Series Champion

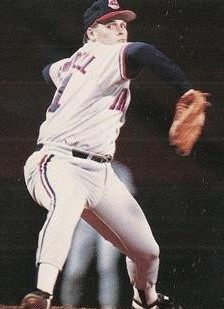
Greg Swindell, Texas all-time strikeouts and wins leader

Number	Player	Position	Years at Texas
3	Keith Moreland	IF	1973-75
10	Kirk Dressendorfer	RHP	1988-90
20	Burt Hooton	RHP	1969-71
21	Greg Swindell	LHP	1984–86
21	Roger Clemens	RHP	1982–83
23	Brooks Kieschnick	RHP/DH	1991-93
25	Huston Street	RHP	2002-05
25	Scott Bryant	OF	1987-89
26	Taylor Jungmann	RHP	2009-11

== Records ==
=== Single-season team records ===
Games

- Most Games played: 80 (1983 team)
- Most Victories: 66 (1983 team)
- Most Losses: 32 (1998 team)
- Best Winning Percentage: .908 (1982 team)
- Longest Winning Streak: 34 (1977 team)

Offense

- Most At-Bats: 2,512 (1985 team)
- Most Runs Scored: 663 (1985 team)
- Most Hits: 785 (1985 team)
- Most Doubles: 177 (1989 team)
- Most Triples: 51 (1975 team)
- Most Home Runs: 81 (2010 team)
- Most Total Bases: 1,186 (2002 team)
- Most Runs Batted In: 597 (1985 team)
- Most Sacrifice Hits: 126 (2000 team)
- Most Walks: 548 (1985 team)
- Most Strikeouts: 578 (2021 team)
- Most Stolen Bases: 173 (1982 team)
- Most Double Plays: 80 (2005 team)
- Highest Batting Average: .325 (1975 team)
- Highest Slugging Percentage: .508 (1974 team)

Pitching

- Most Innings Pitched: 669 (1983 team)
- Most Saves: 23 (2002 and 2011 team)
- Lowest Earned Run Average: 1.88 (1970 team)
- Most Complete Games: 40 (1983 team)
- Most Shutouts: 16 (1975 team)
- Most Strikeouts: 618 (1985 team)

Fielding

- Highest Fielding Percentage: .982 (2011 and 2017 team)
- Fewest Errors: 43 (2017 team)

== Notable players ==
Over 100 former Longhorns have gone on to play Major League Baseball.

- Jim Acker
- Max Alvis
- Tony Arnold
- Brandon Belt
- Bill Bethea
- Scott Bryant
- Dave Chalk
- Roger Clemens
- Dennis Cook
- Jordan Danks
- Kirk Dressendorfer
- Scott Dunn
- Brandon Fahey
- Bibb Falk
- Ron Gardenhire
- Jerry Don Gleaton
- Wayne Graham
- Cliff Gustafson
- Joe Hague
- Brad Halsey
- Shane Halter
- Tom Hamilton
- Todd Haney
- Kip Harkrider
- Tommy Harmon
- Grady Hatton
- Pinky Higgins
- Michael Hollimon
- Burt Hooton
- J.P. Howell
- Tex Hughson
- Randy Jackson
- Rudy Jaramillo
- Taylor Jungmann
- Brooks Kieschnick
- Corey Knebel
- Ernie Koy
- Bobby Layne
- Sam LeCure
- David Maroul
- Keith Moreland
- Calvin Murray
- Spike Owen
- Mark Petkovsek
- Omar Quintanilla
- Mickey Reichenbach
- Shane Reynolds
- Bruce Ruffin
- Chance Ruffin
- James Russell
- Calvin Schiraldi
- Phil Seibel
- J. L. Smith
- Huston Street
- Drew Stubbs
- Greg Swindell
- Taylor Teagarden
- Curtis Thigpen
- Brandon Workman

== See also ==
- Clark Field II
- List of Big 12 Conference champions in baseball
- List of NCAA Division I baseball programs
- List of Texas Longhorns in the MLB draft
- List of Southwest Conference champions in baseball
