= List of Texas Longhorns head baseball coaches =

The Texas Longhorns baseball program is a college baseball team that represents the University of Texas in the Southeastern Conference in the National Collegiate Athletic Association. The team has seen 15 individuals hold the head coach position since it started playing organized baseball in the 1895 season. Two of these coaches had non-consecutive tenures. Since 1911, only seven people have held the position.

Having served for 29 seasons, Cliff Gustafson holds the record for wins at 1,466 and winning percentage at .795. Gustafson, Bibb Falk, and Augie Garrido each won 2 College World Series titles while in Austin.

== Key ==
General
#	Number of coaches (Note: A running total of the number of head coaches.)
GC	Games coached
†	Elected to the National College Baseball Hall of Fame

Overall
OW	Wins
OL	Losses
OT	Ties
O%	Winning percentage

Conference (Note: The Longhorns played as part of the Southern Intercollegiate Athletic Association from their first years until joining the Texas Intercollegiate Athletic Association in 1907. Texas led the creation of the Southwest Conference in 1915, which became the Big 12 Conference after a merger in 1997.)
CW	Wins
CL	Losses
CT	Ties
C%	Winning percentage

Postseason (Note: Postseason play involving the NCAA Division I Baseball Championship.)
PA	Total Appearances (Note: Postseason appearances include seasons with NCAA Division I Baseball Championship bids since the tournament began in 1947.)
PW	Total Wins
PL	Total Losses
WA	College World Series appearances (Note: College World Series appearances include seasons with CWS bids since the tournament began in 1947.)
WW	College World Series wins
WL	College World Series losses

Championships
CC	Conference regular season
CT	Conference tournament (Note: Includes Conference Tournaments, which began in 1976.)

== Coaches ==
List of head baseball coaches showing season(s) coached, overall records, conference records, postseason records, championships and selected awards*Statistics updated through 2025 season
#	Name	Term	GC	OW	OL	OT	O%	CW	CL	CT	C%	PA	PW	PL	WA	WW	WL	CCs	CTs	NCs	Awards (Note: National, regional and conference coach of the year awards.)
1	H. B. Beck	1896	Incomplete records																		
2	F. Weikart	1897	11	6	5	0	.545	—	—	—	—	—	—	—	—	—	—	0	—	0	—
3	A. C. Ellis	1898–1899, 1901–1903, 1909	94	61	31	2	.660	—	—	—	—	—	—	—	—	—	—	1	—	0	—
4	Maurice Gordon Clarke	1900	17	14	2	1	.853	—	—	—	—	—	—	—	—	—	—	0	—	0	—
5	Ralph Hutchinson	1904–1906	73	45	27	1	.623	—	—	—	—	—	—	—	—	—	—	1	—	0	—
6	H. R. Schenker	1907	24	16	8	0	.667	—	—	—	—	—	—	—	—	—	—	1	—	0	—
7	Brooks Gordon	1908		16	12	1	.569	—	—	—	—	—	—	—	—	—	—	1	—	0	—
8	Charles A. Keith	1910	20	8	11	1	.425	—	—	—	—	—	—	—	—	—	—	0	—	0	—
9	Billy Disch†	1911–1939	705	513	180	12	.736	284	70	4	.799	—	—	—	—	—	—	22	—	0	—
10	Bibb Falk†	1940–1942, 1946–1967	664	478	176	10	.727	276	84	7	.762	15	35	26	10	20	17	20	—	2	—
11	Blair Cherry	1943–1945	53	30	23	0	.566	22	4	0	.846	—	—	—	—	—	—	2	—	0	—
12	Cliff Gustafson†	1968–1996	1,845	1,466	377	2	.795	472	151	1	.757	27	132	52	17	54	27	22	11	2	1982, 1983 National Coach of the Year
13	Augie Garrido†	1997–2016	1254	824	428	2	.658	321	210	1	.604	15	64	35	8	20	12	7	5	2	2002, 2005 National Coach of the Year
14	David Pierce	2017–2024	459	297	162	0	.647	101	71	0	.587	6	25	14	3	3	6	3	0	0	(2018, 2021) National Coach of the Year (2018,2021) Big 12 Coach of the year
15	Jim Schlossnagle	2025–present	58	44	14	0	.759	22	8	0	.733	1	2	2	0	0	0	1	0	0	
