= Cliff Gustafson =

American baseball coach (1931–2023)

- .

Biographical details
- Born: February 12, 1931; Kenedy, Texas, U.S.
- Died: January 2, 2023 (aged 91); Austin, Texas, U.S.

Playing career
- 1952: Texas

Coaching career (HC unless noted)
- 1953–1967: South San Antonio (TX) HS
- 1968–1996: Texas

Head coaching record
- Overall: 1,466–377–2 (college)

Accomplishments and honors

Championships
- 2× College World Series (1975, 1983); 22× SWC Regular season Champion (1968–1976, 1979–1988, 1991, 1992, 1996); 11× SWC Tournament champion (1979–1984, 1987, 1988, 1990, 1991, 1994)

Awards
- 1982 National Coach of the Year; 1983 Collegiate Baseball Coach of the Year; 1983 University of Texas Hall of Honor; 1992 ABCA Hall of Fame; 1994 Texas Sports Hall of Fame; 1998 James Keller Sportsmanship Award
- College Baseball Hall of Fame; Inducted in 2006

Clifford L. Gustafson (February 12, 1931 – January 2, 2023) was an American high school and college baseball coach who was, for twenty-nine seasons, the head coach of the Texas Longhorns, representing the University of Texas at Austin.

== Early life ==
Gustafson was a native of Kenedy, Texas. He attended the University of Texas at Austin and played college baseball for the Texas Longhorns, including the 1952 team that won the Southwest Conference championship and reached the College World Series. Gustafson posted a .308 batting average for his collegiate career and went on to play professional baseball in 1953.

== Coaching career ==
=== South San Antonio High School ===
After briefly playing baseball professionally, Gustafson embarked on a successful 14-year-high school coaching career that began in 1953 at South San Antonio High School in San Antonio, Texas. During his 14 seasons at South San, Gustafson's teams won the Class 3A State Championships an impressive seven times: 1958, 1959, 1961, 1963, 1964, 1966,1967.

=== The University of Texas ===
In 1968, after hanging up initially on University of Texas football coach and athletic director Darrell Royal, thinking it was a prank phone call, Gustafson took a pay cut to coach the baseball team at The University of Texas at Austin. While there, he led the Longhorns to 22 Southwest Conference Championships, a record 17 College World Series appearances, with finals appearances resulting in national championships in 1975 and 1983.

Many of Gustafson's players went on to play Major League Baseball. Among that group are Jim Acker, Billy Bates, Mike Brumley, Mike Capel, Roger Clemens, Dennis Cook, Scott Coolbaugh, Keith Creel, Kirk Dressendorfer, Ron Gardenhire, Jim Gideon, Jerry Don Gleaton, Burt Hooton, Bob Kearney, Brooks Kieschnick, Keith Moreland, Calvin Murray, Spike Owen, Karl Pagel, Mark Petkovsek, Shane Reynolds, Andre Robertson, Bruce Ruffin, Calvin Schiraldi, J.D. Smart, Greg Swindell, Jose Tolentino, Richard Wortham, and Ricky Wright. Gustafson has been inducted into the University of Texas Hall of Honor (1983), American Baseball Coaches Association Hall of Fame (1992) and the Texas Sports Hall of Fame (1994). He was named National Coach of the Year in baseball in 1983 by Collegiate Baseball and awarded the 1998 James Keller Sportsmanship Award. He was also an inaugural member of the College Baseball Hall of Fame in 2006.

Gustafson resigned in July 1996 amid a dispute regarding the financial arrangement related to his summer baseball camp.

== Head coaching record ==
Record table
Season	Team	Overall	Conference	Standing	Postseason
University of Texas Longhorns (Southwest Conference) (1968–1996)
1968	Texas	23–11	12–4	1st	College World Series
1969	Texas	40–6	14–2	1st	College World Series
1970	Texas	45–8	14–1	1st	College World Series
1971	Texas	35–11	15–3	1st	NCAA Regional
1972	Texas	50–9	12–6	T-1st	College World Series
1973	Texas	50–7	15–3	1st	College World Series
1974	Texas	54–8	20–4	1st	College World Series
1975	Texas	59–6	23–1	1st	College World Series champions
1976	Texas	48–16	19–5	1st	NCAA Regional
1977	Texas	53–10	17–7	2nd	
1978	Texas	36–17	12–12	5th	
1979	Texas	61–8	22–2	1st	College World Series
1980	Texas	53–13	18–6	1st	NCAA Regional
1981	Texas	62–11–1	16–5	1st	College World Series
1982	Texas	59–7	12–4	1st	College World Series
1983	Texas	66–14	18–3	1st	College World Series champions
1984	Texas	60–14	16–5	1st	College World Series Runner-Up
1985	Texas	64–14	16–5	1st	College World Series Runner-Up
1986	Texas	51–14	16–5	T-1st	NCAA Regional
1987	Texas	61–11	18–3	1st	College World Series
1988	Texas	58–11–1	18–2–1	1st	NCAA Regional
1989	Texas	54–18	14–7	3rd	College World Series Runner-Up
1990	Texas	51–17	15–5	2nd	NCAA Regional
1991	Texas	48–19	14–7	1st	NCAA Regional
1992	Texas	48–17	28–8	1st	College World Series
1993	Texas	51–16	11–7	T-2nd	College World Series
1994	Texas	43–21	9–9	4th	NCAA Regional
1995	Texas	44–19	14–10	4th	NCAA Regional
1996	Texas	39–24	17–7	1st	NCAA Regional
Texas:		1466–377–2 (.795)	472–151–1 (.757)		
Total:		1,466–377–2 (.795)			
National champion Postseason invitational champion Conference regular season champion Conference regular season and conference tournament champion Division regular season champion Division regular season and conference tournament champion Conference tournament champion

== After coaching ==
Until his death, Gustafson resided at his home in Austin, Texas.

Gustafson died on January 2, 2023, at the age of 91.

== Achievements ==
National Championships: 1975, 1983

SWC Championships: 1968, 1969, 1970, 1971, 1972, 1973, 1974, 1975, 1976, 1979, 1980, 1981, 1982, 1983, 1984, 1985, 1986, 1987, 1988, 1991, 1992, 1996

SWC Tournament championships: 1979, 1980, 1981, 1982, 1983, 1984, 1987, 1988, 1990, 1991, 1994

Collegiate Career Record: (1968–1996): 1466-377-2 (.795)

NCAA tournament Record: 122–55 (.689)

National Coach of the Year: 1982, 1983

College World Series appearances: 1968, 1969, 1970, 1972, 1973, 1974, 1975, 1979, 1981, 1982, 1983, 1984, 1985, 1987, 1989, 1992, 1993

Coached 35 first-team All Americans, 12 second-team All Americans, and 9 third-team All Americans

Inducted into the American Baseball Coaches Association Hall of Fame.

Inducted into the Texas Sports Hall of Fame.

Named an inaugural member of the National College Baseball Hall of Fame in 2006.

Gustafson's Longhorns had a 39–0 record against minor league & semi-pro teams in exhibitions.

Gustafson was never ejected from the game while coaching the Longhorns.

== See also ==
- List of college baseball career coaching wins leaders
