= 1988 Southwest Conference baseball tournament =

- Teams: 4
- Format: Double-elimination tournament
- Finals site: George Cole Field; Fayetteville, AR
- Champions: Texas (8th title)
- Winning coach: Cliff Gustafson (8th title)

1988 Southwest Conference baseball standings
	Conf.				Overall
Team	W		L	PCT	W		L	PCT
No. 10 Texas ‍†‍‡‍^{y}	18	–	2	.900	58	–	11	.841
No. 11 Texas A&M ‍‍‍^{y}	17	–	4	.810	52	–	15	.776
Arkansas ‍‍‍^{y}	12	–	9	.571	39	–	23	.629
Baylor ‍‍‍	9	–	12	.429	25	–	31	.446
TCU ‍‍‍	8	–	13	.381	27	–	32	.458
Texas Tech ‍‍‍	7	–	14	.333	34	–	25	.576
Houston ‍‍‍	6	–	14	.300	33	–	22	.600
Rice ‍‍‍	6	–	15	.286	31	–	28	.525
† – Conference champion ‡ – Tournament champion y – Invited to the NCAA tournament As of June 30, 1988; Rankings from Collegiate Baseball

The 1988 Southwest Conference baseball tournament was the league's annual postseason tournament used to determine the Southwest Conference's (SWC) automatic bid to the 1988 NCAA Division I baseball tournament. The tournament was held from May 19 through 22 at George Cole Field on the campus of The University of Arkansas in Fayetteville, AR.

The number 1 seed Texas Longhorns went 4–1 to win the team's 8th SWC tournament under head coach Cliff Gustafson.

== Format and seeding ==
The tournament featured the top four finishers of the SWC's 8 teams in a double-elimination tournament.

Place	Team	Conference				Overall			Seed
Place	Team	W	L	%	GB	W	L	%	Seed
1	Texas	18	2	.900	-	58	11	.841	1
2	Texas A&M	17	4	.810	1.5	52	15	.776	2
3	Arkansas	12	9	.571	6.5	39	23	.629	3
4	Baylor	9	12	.429	9.5	25	31	.446	4
5	TCU	8	13	.381	10.5	27	32	.458	-
6	Texas Tech	7	14	.333	11.5	34	25	.576	-
7	Houston	6	14	.300	12	33	22	.600	-
8	Rice	6	15	.286	12.5	31	28	.525	-

== Tournament ==
Upper round 1
1	Texas	2
4	Baylor	4
2	Texas A&M	4
3	Arkansas	3
Lower round 1
1	Texas	7
3	Arkansas	1

Upper final
4	Baylor	1
2	Texas A&M	6
Lower final
4	Baylor	5
1	Texas	8

Final
2	Texas A&M	0	7
1	Texas	10	12
