= Ray Blades =

American baseball player and manager (1896–1979)

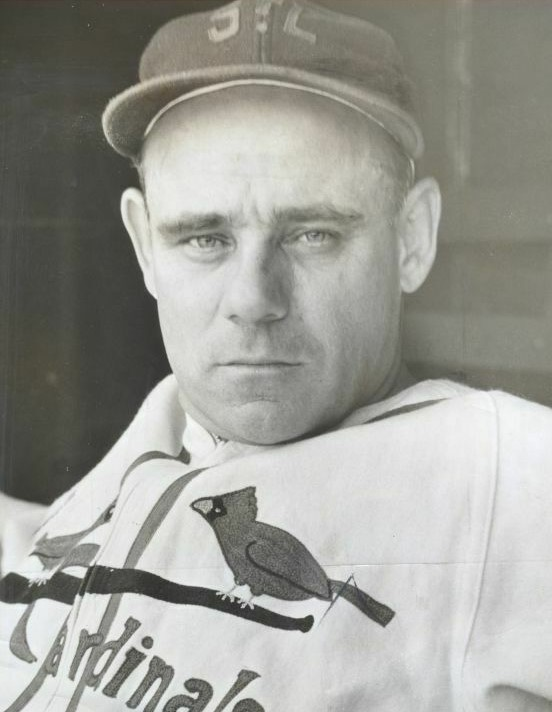
- Left fielder / Manager
- Born: August 6, 1896; Mount Vernon, Illinois, U.S.
- Died: May 18, 1979 (aged 82); Lincoln, Illinois, U.S.
- Batted: Right Threw: Right

MLB debut
- August 19, 1922, for the St. Louis Cardinals

Last MLB appearance
- September 25, 1932, for the St. Louis Cardinals

MLB statistics
- Batting average: .301
- Home runs: 50
- Runs batted in: 340
- Managerial record: 107–85
- Winning percentage: .557
- Stats at Baseball Reference

Teams
- As player: St. Louis Cardinals (1922–1928, 1930–1932); As manager: St. Louis Cardinals (1939–1940); Brooklyn Dodgers (1948); As coach: St. Louis Cardinals (1930–1932); Cincinnati Reds (1942); Brooklyn Dodgers (1947–1948); St. Louis Cardinals (1951); Chicago Cubs (1953–1956)

Career highlights and awards
- World Series champion (1931)

Francis Raymond Blades (August 6, 1896 – May 18, 1979) was an American left fielder, manager, coach and scout in Major League Baseball (MLB).

== Scouted on the sandlots by Rickey ==
A native of McLeansboro, Illinois, Blades was first scouted as a baseball player as a teenager in 1913. Branch Rickey, then the business manager of the St. Louis Browns, spotted Blades during a sandlot game for the St. Louis city championship. Seven years would pass, however, before Rickey would sign World War I veteran Blades to a contract; by that time, 1920, however, Rickey was working for the Browns’ National League rivals, the St. Louis Cardinals.

Blades threw and batted right-handed, stood 5 feet 7 inches (1.70 m) tall and weighed 163 pounds (74 kg). After apprenticing in the minor leagues, Blades reached the Cardinals in 1922. Hampered by a severe knee injury, he appeared in over 100 games only three times – from 1924 to 1926 – but he hung on as a spare outfielder for ten major league seasons (1922–28; 1930–32), all with the Cardinals, and batted .301 lifetime. In his finest season, 1925, he hit .342 in 462 at-bats. He appeared in three World Series (1928, 1930 and 1931). Beginning a transition to a management career, he was a playing coach for the Cardinals from 1930 to 1932.

== Manager, coach and scout ==
Blades was known as a ferocious competitor with a terrible temper, and he carried that reputation with him as a manager in the Cardinals’ farm system. He managed at the top level of the St. Louis organization with the Rochester Red Wings and Columbus Red Birds from 1933 to 1938 and was named skipper of the Cardinals in 1939.

Upon his appointment, he prohibited alcohol drinking among his players. In his first season, the Cards responded to Blades’ tough regimen, winning 92 games and improving from sixth to second place in the National League. But the Cardinals slumped in the early weeks of 1940, winning only 14 of their first 38 games and plunging back into sixth place. On June 7, Blades was fired and ultimately replaced by Billy Southworth, who would lead the Cardinals to two world championships in the decade.

He then coached in the National League for the Cincinnati Reds (1942), Brooklyn Dodgers (1947–48) and Chicago Cubs (1953–56), in addition to a one-year return to the Cardinals (1951). He managed again in minor league baseball, spending two non-consecutive years (1941 and 1943) as skipper of the New Orleans Pelicans and three seasons (1944–46) at the helm of the St. Paul Saints, which then was one of the Dodgers' two top-level farm teams. He also worked in Brooklyn's farm system as a managerial consultant (1949–50) and scouted for the Cubs from 1957 into the early 1960s.

After 1940, Blades never managed again full-time in the big leagues, although during his tenure with Brooklyn he and a fellow coach, Clyde Sukeforth, turned down the job as acting manager of the 1947 Dodgers after the suspension of Leo Durocher for the season. Rickey, by then president of the Dodgers, ultimately turned to Burt Shotton, one of the team's scouts, and under Shotton Brooklyn won the 1947 NL pennant. During the following year, 1948, Blades served as interim Dodger pilot for a single game, when Durocher left Brooklyn for the New York Giants job, and Shotton succeeded him a second time. The Dodgers won Blades' one game at the helm, 4–2, on July 16, 1948, against the Reds. His final record as a big-league manager was 107–85 (.557).

Ray Blades died in Lincoln, Illinois at the age of 82 in 1979.

== See also ==
- List of St. Louis Cardinals managers
- List of St. Louis Cardinals coaches
- List of Major League Baseball players who spent their entire career with one franchise

Sporting positions
Preceded by Billy Southworth	Columbus Red Birds manager 1933–1935	Succeeded by Burt Shotton
Preceded by Burt Shotton	Rochester Red Wings manager 1936–1938	Succeeded by Billy Southworth
Preceded by Hal Anderson; Pat Ankenman	New Orleans Pelicans manager 1941; 1943	Succeeded by Pat Ankenman; Fresco Thompson
Preceded by Salty Parker	St. Paul Saints (1901–1960) manager 1944–1946	Succeeded by Herman Franks
