= 1994 Southwest Conference baseball tournament =

- Teams: 4
- Format: Double-elimination tournament
- Finals site: Disch–Falk Field; Austin, TX
- Champions: Texas (11th title)
- Winning coach: Cliff Gustafson (11th title)

1994 Southwest Conference baseball standings
	Conf.				Overall
Team	W		L	PCT	W		L	PCT
No. 27 TCU ‍†‍‍^{y}	14	–	4	.778	38	–	22	.633
Rice ‍‍‍	12	–	6	.667	34	–	21	.618
Texas Tech ‍‍‍	12	–	6	.667	40	–	17	.702
No. 15 Texas ‍‍‡‍^{y}	9	–	9	.500	43	–	21	.672
Texas A&M ‍‍‍	6	–	12	.333	31	–	22	.585
Baylor ‍‍‍	6	–	12	.333	24	–	28	.462
Houston ‍‍‍	4	–	14	.222	30	–	26	.536
† – Conference champion ‡ – Tournament champion y – Invited to the NCAA tournament As of June 30, 1994; Rankings from Collegiate Baseball

The 1994 Southwest Conference baseball tournament was the league's annual postseason tournament used to determine the Southwest Conference's (SWC) automatic bid to the 1994 NCAA Division I baseball tournament. The tournament was held from May 12 through 15 at Disch–Falk Field on the campus of The University of Texas in Austin, Texas.

The number 4 seed Texas Longhorns went 3–0 to win the team's 11th SWC tournament under head coach Cliff Gustafson.

== Format and seeding ==
The tournament featured the top four finishers of the SWC's 7 teams in a double-elimination tournament.

Place	Team	Conference				Overall			Seed
Place	Team	W	L	%	GB	W	L	%	Seed
1	TCU	14	4	.778	-	38	22	.633	1
2	Rice	12	6	.667	2	34	21	.618	2
3	Texas Tech	12	6	.667	2	40	17	.702	3
4	Texas	9	9	.500	5	43	21	.672	4
5	Texas A&M	6	12	.333	8	31	22	.585	-
6	Baylor	6	12	.333	8	24	28	.462	-
7	Houston	4	14	.222	10	30	26	.536	-

== Tournament ==
First round
1	TCU	0
4	Texas	3
2	Rice	11
3	Texas Tech	12
Lower round 1
1	TCU	3
2	Rice	10

Semifinals
4	Texas	2
3	Texas Tech	1
Lower final
3	Texas Tech	2
2	Rice	1

Finals
4	Texas
3	Texas Tech
