= Scott Bryant =

American baseball player

- Outfielder
- Born: October 31, 1967 (age 58); Austin, Texas, U.S.
- Bats: Right Throws: Right
- Stats at Baseball Reference

Career highlights and awards
- Dick Howser Trophy (1989); Collegiate Baseball Player of the Year (1989); Texas Longhorns No. 25 retired

Scott Walter Bryant (born October 31, 1967) is an American former college baseball and minor league baseball outfielder.

== College career ==
Bryant attended the University of Texas, where he played for the Texas Longhorns baseball team. In the 1989 College World Series, Bryant helped lead Texas to the championship game. Bryant was named to the All-Tournament Team. That year, Bryant won the Dick Howser Trophy as the collegiate baseball player of the year.

== Professional career ==
Bryant was chosen in the first round (20th overall) of the 1989 Major League Baseball draft by the Cincinnati Reds. After the 1991 season, he was traded to the Chicago Cubs for Ty Griffin. He played in the minor leagues through 1998, not making the major leagues.
