= Ivan Melendez =

American baseball player (born 2000)

High Point Rockers – No. 44
- First baseman / Third baseman
- Born: January 24, 2000 (age 26); El Paso, Texas, U.S.
- Bats: Right Throws: Right

Career highlights and awards
- Golden Spikes Award (2022); Dick Howser Trophy (2022); Collegiate Baseball Player of the Year (2022)

Raul Ivan Melendez (born January 24, 2000), nicknamed "the Hispanic Titanic", is an American professional baseball infielder for the High Point Rockers of the Atlantic League of Professional Baseball. He played college baseball for the Texas Longhorns, winning the Golden Spikes Award and Dick Howser Trophy in 2022.

== Amateur career ==
Melendez grew up in El Paso, Texas, and attended Coronado High School. He spent two seasons playing college baseball at Odessa College, a junior college that competed in the National Junior College Athletic Association (NJCAA), as a third baseman. During Melendez's freshman season at Odessa, he batted .411 with 17 home runs, 70 runs batted in (RBIs), and a .896 slugging percentage. He was named third-team NJCAA Division I All-American. Melendez's sophomore season was cut short due to COVID-19. However, during the shortened season, Melendez batted .354 with seven doubles, three triples and four homers.

In 2021, Melendez committed to the University of Texas at Austin to continue his college baseball career with the Texas Longhorns as a redshirt sophomore. During Melendez's first season at Texas, he hit .319 with 13 doubles, 3 triples, 13 home runs, and 51 RBIs. Melendez hit the go-ahead home run against Mississippi State in the College World Series. Melendez also earned 2021 First-Team All Big 12 Conference honors and the All-Tournament team for the College World Series.

After being selected in the 16th round of the 2021 Major League Baseball draft by the Miami Marlins, Melendez chose to return to Texas for his junior year. In 2022, Melendez hit .387 with 96 hits, 94 RBIs, and 32 home runs, which broke Kyle Russell's school record and Kris Bryant's national home run record since the BBCOR bats were introduced in 2011. Melendez won Big 12 Player of the Year and also won first team all-Big 12. Nationally, Melendez won the Golden Spikes Award, Dick Howser Trophy, and Collegiate Baseball Newspaper player of the year. Melendez was also awarded American Baseball Coaches Association First Team All-American.

== Professional career ==
=== Arizona Diamondbacks ===
The Arizona Diamondbacks selected Melendez in the second round, with the 43rd overall selection, of the 2022 MLB draft. He signed with the team for $1.4 million on July 23, 2022. Melendez split his first professional season between the rookie-level Arizona Complex League Diamondbacks and Single-A Visalia Rawhide.

On June 23, 2023, while playing for the High–A Hillsboro Hops, Melendez hit for the cycle in a 10–6 loss to the Everett AquaSox. In doing so, he became the second player in franchise history to hit for the cycle, and the first to do so at home.

Melendez began the 2025 season with the Double-A Amarillo Sod Poodles, hitting .258/.348/.480 with 16 home runs and 43 RBI. On August 2, 2025, Melendez was promoted to the Triple-A Reno Aces. In 25 appearances for the Aces, he slashed .292/.347/.483 with three home runs and 19 RBI.

Melendez was assigned to Triple-A Reno to begin the 2026 season, where he batted .222/.280/.378 with two home runs and eight RBI across 12 games. He was released by the Diamondbacks organization on April 23, 2026.

=== El Águila de Veracruz ===
On May 11, 2026, Melendez signed with El Águila de Veracruz of the Mexican League. In eight games for Veracruz, he batted .294/.333/.353 with one RBI and one stolen base. On June 5, Melendez was placed on the team's reserve list.

=== High Point Rockers ===
On June 9, 2026, Melendez has his contract transferred to the High Point Rockers of the Atlantic League of Professional Baseball.
