= 1989 Major League Baseball draft =

Baseball draft of amateur players

General information
- Dates: June 5-x, 1989

Overview
- 1490 total selections
- First selection: Ben McDonald; Baltimore Orioles
- First round selections: 30
- Hall of Famers: 5: 1B Frank Thomas; 1B Jeff Bagwell; SS Trevor Hoffman; 3B/1B Jim Thome; 2B Jeff Kent

The 1989 Major League Baseball draft took place in June 1989. The draft saw the Baltimore Orioles select Ben McDonald first overall.

== First-round selections ==
The following are the first round picks in the 1989 Major League Baseball draft on June 5.

= All-Star	= Baseball Hall of Famer

Pick	Player	Team	Position	School
1	Ben McDonald	Baltimore Orioles	RHP	LSU
2	Tyler Houston	Atlanta Braves	C	Valley High School (NV)
3	Roger Salkeld	Seattle Mariners	RHP	Saugus High School (CA)
4	Jeff Jackson	Philadelphia Phillies	OF	Simeon High School (IL)
5	Donald Harris	Texas Rangers	OF	Texas Tech
6	Paul Coleman	St. Louis Cardinals	OF	Frankston High School (TX)
7	Frank Thomas	Chicago White Sox	1B	Auburn
8	Earl Cunningham	Chicago Cubs	OF	Lancaster High School (SC)
9	Kyle Abbott	California Angels	LHP	Long Beach State
10	Charles Johnson	Montreal Expos	C	Westwood High School (FL)
11	Calvin Murray	Cleveland Indians	3B	W.T. White High School (TX)
12	Jeff Juden	Houston Astros	RHP	Salem High School (MA)
13	Brent Mayne	Kansas City Royals	C	Cal State Fullerton
14	Steve Hosey	San Francisco Giants	OF	Fresno State
15	Kiki Jones	Los Angeles Dodgers	RHP	Hillsborough High School (FL)
16	Greg Blosser	Boston Red Sox	OF	Sarasota High School (FL)
17	Cal Eldred	Milwaukee Brewers	RHP	Iowa
18	Willie Greene	Pittsburgh Pirates	SS	Jones County High School (GA)
19	Eddie Zosky	Toronto Blue Jays	SS	Fresno State
20	Scott Bryant	Cincinnati Reds	OF	Texas
21	Greg Gohr	Detroit Tigers	RHP	Santa Clara
22	Tom Goodwin	Los Angeles Dodgers	OF	Fresno State
23	Mo Vaughn	Boston Red Sox	1B	Seton Hall
24	Alan Zinter	New York Mets	C	Arizona
25	Chuck Knoblauch	Minnesota Twins	2B	Texas A&M
26	Scott Burrell	Seattle Mariners	RHP	Hamden High School (CT)

== Supplemental first round selections ==
Pick	Player	Team	Position	School
27	Todd Jones	Houston Astros	RHP	Jacksonville State
28	Jamie McAndrew	Los Angeles Dodgers	RHP	Florida
29	Kevin Morton	Boston Red Sox	LHP	Seton Hall
30	Gordon Powell	Milwaukee Brewers	3B	Hughes HS (Cincinnati)

== Other notable players ==
- Brian Hunter, 2nd round, 35th overall by the Houston Astros
- Tim Salmon, 3rd round, 69th overall by the California Angels
- Jerry Dipoto, 3rd round, 71st overall by the Cleveland Indians
- Shane Reynolds†, 3rd round, 72nd overall by the Houston Astros
- John Olerud†, 3rd round, 79th overall by the Toronto Blue Jays
- Phil Nevin†, 3rd round, 82nd overall by the Los Angeles Dodgers, but did not sign
- Eric Wedge, 3rd round, 83rd overall by the Boston Red Sox
- Brook Fordyce, 3rd round, 84th overall by the New York Mets
- Denny Neagle†, 3rd round, 85th overall by the Minnesota Twins
- Jeff Bagwell‡, 4th round, 110th overall by the Boston Red Sox
- Scott Erickson†, 4th round, 112th overall by the Minnesota Twins
- Ryan Klesko†, 4th round, 116th overall by the Atlanta Braves
- Alan Embree, 5th round, 125th overall by the Cleveland Indians
- J. T. Snow, 5th round, 129th overall by the New York Yankees
- Paul Quantrill†, 6th round, 163rd overall by the Boston Red Sox
- Russ Springer, 7th round, 181st overall by the New York Yankees
- Butch Huskey, 7th round, 190th overall by the New York Mets
- Curt Leskanic, 8th round, 203rd overall by the Cleveland Indians
- Mike Lansing, 9th round, 219th overall by the Baltimore Orioles, but did not sign
- Sterling Hitchcock, 9th round, 233rd overall by the New York Yankees
- Jeffrey Hammonds†, 9th round, 237th overall by the Toronto Blue Jays, but did not sign
- Chad Mottola, 10th round, 245th overall by the Baltimore Orioles, but did not sign
- Scot McCloughan, 10th round, 266th overall by the New York Mets
- Marty Cordova, 10th round, 269th overall by the Minnesota Twins
- Kelly Stinnett, 11th round, 281st overall by the Cleveland Indians
- Trevor Hoffman‡, 11th round, 290th overall by the Cincinnati Reds
- Jim Thome‡, 13th round, 333rd overall by the Cleveland Indians
- Mike Trombley, 14th round, 373rd overall by the Minnesota Twins
- Pat Rapp, 15th round, 388th overall by the San Francisco Giants
- Gregg Zaun, 17th round, 427th overall by the Baltimore Orioles
- Brian Giles†, 17th round, 437th overall by the Cleveland Indians
- Mark Grudzielanek†, 17th round, 450th overall by the New York Mets, but did not sign
- Tim Worrell, 20th round, 520th overall by the San Diego Padres
- Jeff Kent‡, 20th round, 523rd overall by the Toronto Blue Jays
- Robert Person, 25th round, 645th overall by the Cleveland Indians
- Joe Randa, 30th round, 773rd overall by the California Angels, but did not sign
- Joe Borowski, 32nd round, 823rd overall by the Chicago White Sox
- Dana Brown, 35th round, 898th overall by the Philadelphia Phillies
- Hilly Hathaway, 35th round, 903rd overall by the California Angels
- Jorge Posada†, 43rd round, 1,116th overall by the New York Yankees, but did not sign
- Jason Giambi†, 43rd round, 1,118th overall by the Milwaukee Brewers, but did not sign
- Eric Young†, 43rd round, 1,123rd overall by the Los Angeles Dodgers
- Chad Curtis, 45th round, 1,157th overall by the California Angels
- Bobby Magallanes, 50th round, 1,260th overall by the Seattle Mariners
- Denny Hocking, 52nd round, 1,314th overall by the Minnesota Twins

† All-Star
‡ Hall of Famer

=== NBA/NFL players drafted ===
- Scott Burrell, 1st round, 26th overall by the Seattle Mariners, but did not sign
- Jeff Brohm, 7th round, 176th overall by the Montreal Expos, but did not sign
- Rodney Peete, 13th round, 348th overall by the Oakland Athletics, but did not sign
- Marcus Robertson, 19th round, 489th overall by the Cleveland Indians, but did not sign

Preceded by Andy Benes	1st Overall Picks; Ben McDonald	Succeeded by Chipper Jones
