= David Maroul =

American baseball player (born 1983)

- Infielder
- Born: February 15, 1983 (age 43); Fort Worth, Texas, U.S.
- Bats: Right Throws: Right
- Stats at Baseball Reference

Career highlights and awards
- College World Series Most Outstanding Player (2005)

David William Maroul (born February 15, 1983) is an American former professional baseball player. He was the 2005 College World Series Most Outstanding Player. He played collegiately for the Texas Longhorns. He is one of six players from University of Texas at Austin to win that award. The others are: Tom Hamilton, Mickey Reichenbach, Calvin Schiraldi, Huston Street and J.L. Smith.

Prior to attending University of Texas at Austin, he attended Western Hills High School.

Maroul's image was used for the cover of the EA Sports video game MVP 06: NCAA Baseball.

With Texas, he hit .224 in 2004 and .251 in 2005.

Maroul was drafted in the 23rd round of the 2005 Major League Baseball draft by the San Francisco Giants, and began his professional career that same year. He split the year between the AZL Giants and the Salem-Keizer Volcanoes, hitting a combined .275 with six home runs and 32 RBI. In 204 at-bats, he struck out 68 times and walked only six times.

In 2006, Maroul played for the Augusta Greenjackets, hitting .249 with 11 home runs and 67 RBI in 393 at-bats. He walked 25 times and had 123 strikeouts. With the San Jose Giants in 2007, Maroul hit .221 with 20 home runs and 50 RBI, 25 walks and 112 strikeouts in 420 at-bats. He played for the Waikiki Beach Boys of the Hawaiian Winter League that year as well. He played for the Connecticut Defenders in 2008, hitting .230 with 10 home runs, 35 RBI, 21 walks and 110 strikeouts in 366 at-bats. In 2009, he played for the San Jose Giants, Connecticut Defenders and Fresno Grizzlies, hitting a combined .220 with seven home runs and 29 RBI in 63 games.
