= Kyle Russell (baseball) =

American baseball player (born 1986)

- Outfielder
- Born: June 27, 1986 (age 40); Houston, Texas, United States
- Bats: Left Throws: Left
- Stats at Baseball Reference

Kyle D. Russell (born June 27, 1986) is an American former professional baseball outfielder. Russell was originally drafted by the Los Angeles Dodgers in the 3rd round of the 2008 MLB draft out of the University of Texas. He is also the all-time career home run leader (57) at the University of Texas, and formerly the all-time single season home run leader (28). He was born in Houston, Texas and grew up in Tomball, Texas. He was a consensus All-American outfielder in 2007 as a sophomore at Texas, and was named to the NCAA all-decade team in 2010. In 2025, Russell was inducted into the Longhorn Hall of Honor.

== Amateur career ==
Russell attended the University of Texas, where he played for the Texas Longhorn baseball team. In 2006, he played collegiate summer baseball with the Cotuit Kettleers of the Cape Cod Baseball League. In 2007, he was named the Big 12 Player of the Year, and was also a 1st team All-American. He led college baseball in home runs with 28, which was a University of Texas record for most home runs in a single season until Ivan Melendez broke the record in 2022. In May 2008, Russell hit his 57th career homerun at Texas, which broke the previous record of 56. In February 2010, Russell was named to Baseball America's all-2000s team as the second outfielder.

== Professional career ==
In 2008 with the Rookie-level Ogden Raptors, Russell hit .279 with 11 home runs and 46 RBI in 61 games and was named to the post-season Pioneer League All-Star team. In 2009 with the Single-A Great Lakes Loons, he hit .272 with 26 home runs and 102 RBI in 133 games and was named to both the mid-season and post-season Midwest League All-Star teams as well as being selected as the Midwest League Most Valuable Player.

Russell began 2010 with the Class-A (advanced) Inland Empire 66ers of San Bernardino and hit .354 with 16 home runs and 53 RBI in 53 games before a quick promotion to the Double-A Chattanooga Lookouts. In 76 games with the Lookouts, he hit .245 with 10 home runs. In 2011, he was selected to the mid-season Southern League All-Star Game. He was in 120 games with the Lookouts, hitting .259 with 19 home runs and 69 RBI, earning him a late season promotion to the Triple–A Albuquerque Isotopes.

Russell spent most of 2012 back with the Lookouts, appearing in 74 games with a .262 batting average, 11 homers and 44 RBI. He spent considerable time on the disabled list also with various ailments.

In March 2013, Russell was released by the Dodgers and was signed to a minor league contract by the Atlanta Braves. The Braves later released him and he signed with the Lancaster Barnstormers of the Atlantic League of Professional Baseball.
