= Mickey Reichenbach =

- Pitcher / First baseman
- Born: 1953 (age 72–73)
- Bats: Left Throws: Right
- Stats at Baseball Reference

Career highlights and awards
- College World Series champion (1975); College World Series Most Outstanding Player (1975)

Michael Neal Reichenbach (born 1953) was a first baseman who is most notable for winning the 1975 College World Series Most Outstanding Player award while a sophomore at University of Texas at Austin. He hit .455 with three doubles and a home run to earn the honor. On the season, he hit .386. He is one of six players from University of Texas at Austin to win that award. The others are: J.L. Smith, Tom Hamilton, Calvin Schiraldi, Huston Street and David Maroul.

He was drafted two different times. The first time, he was drafted by the Texas Rangers in the 31st round of the 1975 amateur draft. He chose not to sign. When he was taken in the 14th round of the 1977 amateur draft, he did sign. He played three years in the minors, never reaching the big leagues. Professionally, he was used as a pitcher.

In 1977, he played for the Daytona Beach Islanders, going 3–2 with a 2.77 ERA in 10 games. He played for the Fort Myers Royals and Jacksonville Suns in 1978, going 6–7 with a 3.93 ERA in 15 games with the Royals and 2–1 with a 2.00 ERA in seven games with the Suns. In 1979, his final professional season, he again played for the Fort Myers Royals and Suns, and also with the Bakersfield Outlaws. For the Royals, he went 2–0 with a 2.25 ERA in four games. For the Suns, he went 0–0 with a 6.14 ERA in 10 games. With the Outlaws, he went 0–1 with a 24.30 ERA in five games.
