= Curtis Thigpen =

American baseball player (born 1983)

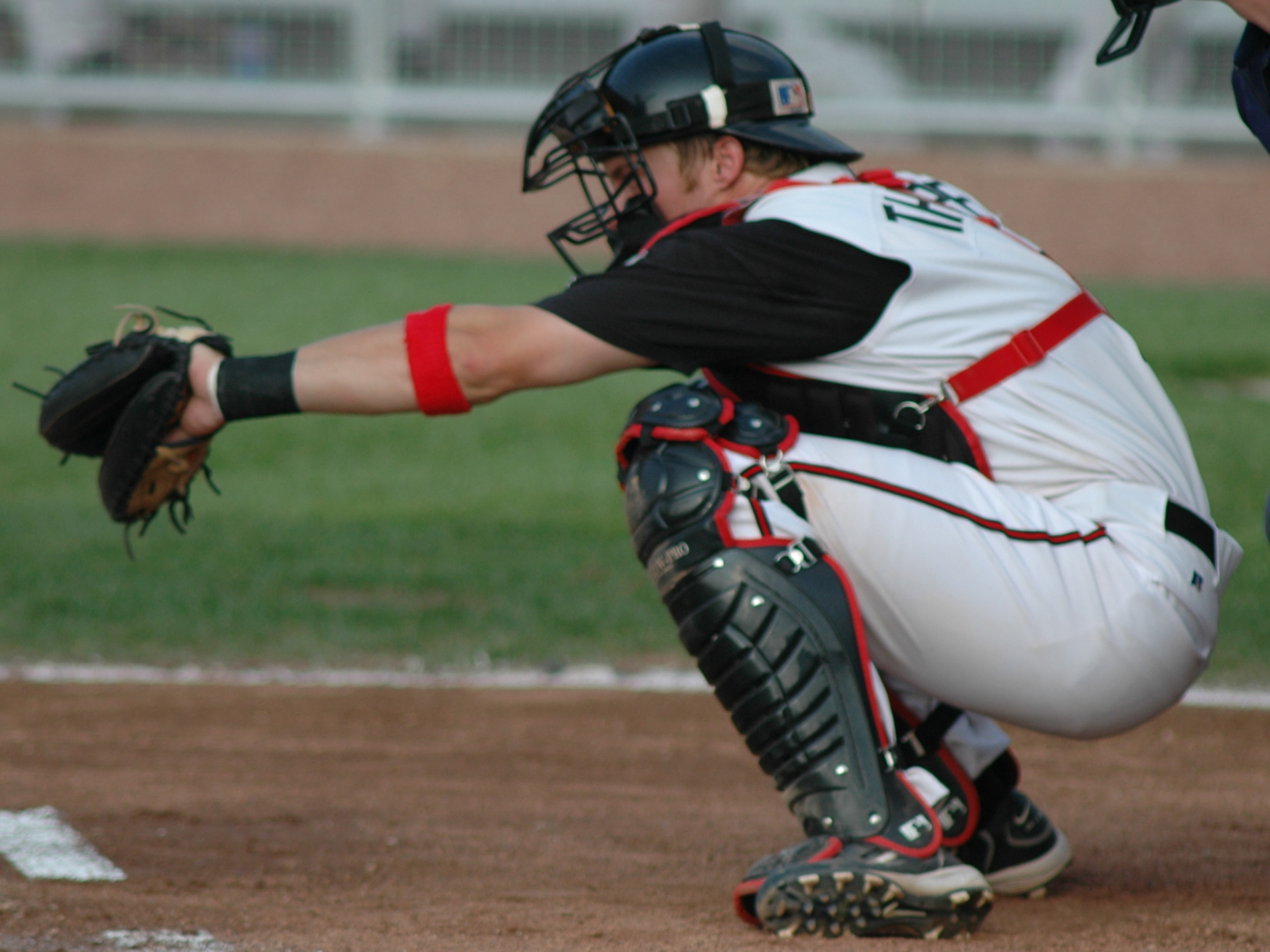
- Thigpen with the Lansing Lugnuts in 2005
- Catcher
- Born: April 19, 1983 (age 41); Dallas, Texas, U.S.
- Batted: Right Threw: Right

MLB debut
- June 6, 2007, for the Toronto Blue Jays

Last MLB appearance
- September 26, 2008, for the Toronto Blue Jays

MLB statistics
- Batting average: .229
- Home runs: 1
- Runs batted in: 12
- Stats at Baseball Reference

Teams
- Toronto Blue Jays (2007–2008)

Curtis Barnard Thigpen (born April 19, 1983) is an American former professional baseball catcher. He played parts of two seasons in Major League Baseball (MLB) with the Toronto Blue Jays.

== Amateur career ==
Thigpen spent his college career at the University of Texas and was part of the College World Series championship team in 2002, during which he was named to the All-Tournament Team. In 2003, he played collegiate summer baseball in the Cape Cod Baseball League for the Yarmouth-Dennis Red Sox and was named a league all-star. Thigpen was selected by the Toronto Blue Jays in the second round of the 2004 MLB draft with the 57th overall pick.

== Professional career ==
In 2007, Thigpen started the season playing for the Syracuse Chiefs, the Triple-A affiliate of the Blue Jays.

Thigpen was called up to the Blue Jays on June 5, 2007, and made his major-league debut the next day at Rogers Centre in Toronto against the Tampa Bay Devil Rays. He started as first baseman and finished the game 1-for-4. For the 2007 season, he had a .238 batting average with 11 RBIs, a .294 on-base percentage and a .287 slugging percentage over 47 major-league games.

During the 2008 season, Thigpen saw less playing time due to fellow catcher Rod Barajas coming to Toronto. On September 26, Thigpen hit his first and only major-league home run, in what proved to be the final at bat of his major-league career. He finished the season with a .176 batting average.

On February 4, 2009, Thigpen was designated for assignment to clear a roster spot for newly acquired pitcher Brian Burres. On February 6, Thigpen was sent outright to the Blue Jays' Triple-A affiliate, the Las Vegas 51s.

On March 27, 2009, Thigpen was traded to the Oakland Athletics in exchange for a player to be named later or cash considerations. He was released in April 2010.

== Post-playing career ==
Thigpen and former Longhorns teammate J. B. Cox returned to the Texas Longhorns as volunteer student assistants in 2010. Thigpen went on to work as a commercial lender at R Bank Texas.

== See also ==
- List of Major League Baseball players with a home run in their final major league at bat
