= Brooks Kieschnick =

American baseball player (born 1972)

- Pitcher / Outfielder
- Born: June 6, 1972 (age 54); Robstown, Texas, U.S.
- Batted: Left Threw: Right

MLB debut
- April 3, 1996, for the Chicago Cubs

Last MLB appearance
- October 3, 2004, for the Milwaukee Brewers

MLB statistics
- Win–loss record: 2–2
- Earned run average: 4.59
- Strikeouts: 67
- Batting average: .248
- Home runs: 16
- Runs batted in: 46
- Stats at Baseball Reference

Teams
- Chicago Cubs (1996–1997); Cincinnati Reds (2000); Colorado Rockies (2001); Milwaukee Brewers (2003–2004)

Career highlights and awards
- 2× Dick Howser Trophy (1992, 1993)

Member of the College

Baseball Hall of Fame
- Induction: 2006
Medals
Men's baseball
Representing United States
World Junior Baseball Championship
Bronze medal – third place	1990 Cuba	Team

Michael Brooks Kieschnick (born June 6, 1972) is an American former professional baseball left fielder and pitcher. The only player to win the Dick Howser Trophy twice, he is a College Baseball Hall of Fame inductee. He played in Major League Baseball (MLB) during six seasons between 1996 and 2004, primarily with the Chicago Cubs and the Milwaukee Brewers. He batted left-handed but threw right-handed. During the initial part of his major league career, he was exclusively a position player; for his final two seasons in the big leagues, he was used primarily as a relief pitcher who also occasionally served as an outfielder and pinch hitter.

Kieschnick played college baseball at the University of Texas at Austin for the Texas Longhorns from 1990 until 1993, when he was drafted by the Chicago Cubs. After two seasons with Chicago, he was selected by the Tampa Bay Devil Rays in the 1997 expansion draft. However, he spent his entire tenure with the organization in the minor leagues. Although he was originally projected to be a hitter, he eventually revived his career by returning to pitching, which he had excelled at during his years with the Texas Longhorns. He was signed by the Milwaukee Brewers in 2003 and played his final major league game for them on October 3, 2004.

== Early life and education ==
Kieschnick was born in Robstown, Texas on June 6, 1972. He graduated from high school at Mary Carroll High School in Corpus Christi, Texas. He then attended college at the University of Texas at Austin, where he played three seasons of baseball.

During his time with the Texas Longhorns, Kieschnick won the Dick Howser Trophy (bestowed annually to the national college baseball player of the year) in 1992. He won the award again in 1993, thus becoming the only player to win the honor twice. In his three years with the Longhorns, Kieschnick batted .360 and slugged 43 home runs and 215 runs batted in, in addition to having a 34–8 win–loss record and a 3.05 ERA. Because of his rare ability of competency in both hitting and pitching, Kieschnick was recognized as one of the most versatile players in college baseball.

== Professional career ==
=== Draft and minor leagues ===
Even though Kieschnick did not play a defensive position, he was selected in the first round as the tenth overall pick of the 1993 amateur draft by the Chicago Cubs. He received a $650,000 signing bonus and was instantly viewed as the organization's best prospect in terms of hitting for power. Kieschnick honed his skills in the minor leagues and was ranked as the Cubs' top prospect by Baseball America during his three seasons in the Cubs farm system. Even though he had pitched well at the college level, the team viewed Kieschnick's offense as being more valuable. Accordingly, he was used exclusively as a position player by the Cubs at both the minor and major league levels. Kieschnick made his major league debut for the Cubs on April 3, 1996.

=== Chicago Cubs (1996–1997) ===
Kieschnick never lived up to his potential and was unable to produce the form he showed in the minor leagues. After appearing in only 25 games during the 1996 season, he was demoted back to the minors in the final week of spring training of 1997. He was described as being "stunned and dejected" when he was informed of the decision to replace him with Brant Brown. Nevertheless, Kieschnick was recalled on April 11 and eventually won the left field position. He played 39 games and finished the season with a disappointing .200 batting average, 2 doubles, 4 home runs and 12 RBIs, while striking out 21 times. After the season ended, Kieschnick was selected as the 64th pick of the 1997 expansion draft by the Tampa Bay Devil Rays and was regarded as "just another underachieving Cub."

=== The wilderness years (1998–2002) ===
Kieschnick was never given the opportunity to play a major league game for the Devil Rays. He was instead consigned to the minor leagues and shuffled between the Gulf Coast League Devil Rays, St. Petersburg Devil Rays, Durham Bulls and Edmonton Trappers during his two-year stint with the organization. In 1999, he was loaned out to the Anaheim Angels for the majority of the year. At the end of the season, Kieschnick became a free agent for the first time in his career and subsequently signed with the Cincinnati Reds.

In the 2000 season, Kieschnick spent most of his time in the minors: his major-league stint that year was limited to just fourteen games and he was unable to garner any hits in his 13 plate appearances that year. He proceeded to sign with the Colorado Rockies as a free agent at the season's end. He again split his time between the minors and the majors. In the 45 major league games he played in 2001, he batted .238, had 10 hits in 42 at bats, amassed 3 home runs and 9 RBIs and struck out 13 times.

Kieschnick signed with the Cleveland Indians for the 2002 season, but was released prior to the end of spring training. Picked up by the Chicago White Sox a month later and signed to a minor league deal, Kieschnick then radically changed his career approach. Up to this point, Kieschnick had pitched in exactly two minor league games in his career—both token relief appearances in blowout games, one in 1999 and one in 2001. Nevertheless, in the 2002 season Kieschnick switched his primary focus to pitching, hoping to better his chances of making a major league roster as a pitcher who was also a versatile utility player. He ended up spending the entire 2002 season in the minor leagues with the triple-A Charlotte Knights, appearing in 25 games as a relief pitcher, 1 as an outfielder and over 40 as either a pinch-hitter or DH. He finished the season batting .275 with 13 home huns in just 189 at bats; as a pitcher, he was 0–1 with a 2.59 ERA in just over 31 innings pitched.

=== Milwaukee Brewers (2003–2004) ===
Signing with the Milwaukee Brewers organization in time for the 2003 campaign, Kieschnick returned to the majors in the role of pitcher/utility outfielder/DH. During the 2003 season, Kieschnick became the first player in the MLB to hit home runs as a pitcher, designated hitter, and pinch hitter in the same season. Throughout 2003 and 2004, the Milwaukee Brewers took advantage of Kieschnick's versatility, using him as a pinch hitter, designated hitter, and left fielder in addition to his primary role in the bullpen. Kieschnick played three complete games as a left fielder in September 2003; these would be his only on-field appearances as a defensive player for Milwaukee (outside of his role as pitcher) during 2003–04.

During his second season with Milwaukee (2004), Kieschnick opened the season as a pitcher/pinch-hitter, but due to an injury was used exclusively as a pinch hitter for a two-month period from July 3-September 3, spending part of that time on the disabled list. Kieschnick did not appear as an outfielder or as a designated hitter during 2004. Though Kieschnick's pitching effectiveness improved over his 2003 season, his hitting tailed off, as he hit only 1 home run all year (compared to 7 in 2003).

In a total of 306 career at-bats, Kieschnick's batting average was .248. In his two seasons of pitching at the major league level, his ERA was 4.59.

=== Return to the minors and retirement (2005–2006) ===
Kieschnick was released by Milwaukee near the end of spring training, 2005. He subsequently spent the 2005 season in the Houston Astros minor league system, hitting .327 but also compiling a pitching record of 2–4 with an ERA of 5.12. On February 15, 2006, Kieschnick announced his retirement from baseball.

== Post-playing days ==
In 2002, in an online poll conducted in Austin, Kieschnick was voted the best baseball player in the history of the University of Texas. He became one of ten inaugural members of the College Baseball Hall of Fame in 2006. On March 29, 2009, Kieschnick had his number 23 retired by the University of Texas. Along with Charlie Robison and two other friends, he founded the Alamo Ice House, a bar in San Antonio, which closed in 2018. He also owns a medical device distribution company. His son, Brooks Jr., is a walk-on offensive lineman at the University of Texas. In 2025, Kieschnick was named to the Coastal Bend Sports Hall of Fame.
