= Charles A. Keith =

American football, basketball and baseball coach

Biographical details
- Born: February 28, 1883; Hot Springs, Arkansas, U.S.
- Died: June 22, 1960 (aged 77); Louisville, Kentucky, U.S.

Playing career

Baseball
- 1905–1906: Arkansas
- 1906–1909: Little Rock Travelers
- Position: Pitcher

Coaching career (HC unless noted)

Football
- 1912: Eastern Kentucky

Basketball
- 1912–1913: Eastern Kentucky

Baseball
- 1910: Texas

Administrative career (AD unless noted)
- 1912–1913: Eastern Kentucky

Head coaching record
- Overall: 3–4–1 (football); 9–3 (basketball); 8–11–1 (baseball)

Charles Alexander Keith (February 28, 1883 – June 22, 1960) was an American football, basketball and baseball coach. He served as the head football coach at Eastern Kentucky University in 1912 after serving as the head baseball coach at the University of Texas in 1910. Keith was a Rhodes Scholar and a member of the faculty at Eastern Kentucky for 41 years.

== Head coaching record ==
=== Football ===
| Year | Team | Overall | Conference | Standing | Bowl/playoffs |
|---|---|---|---|---|---|
Eastern Kentucky Colonels (Independent) (1912)
| 1912 | Eastern Kentucky | 3–4–1 | | | |
| Eastern Kentucky: | | 3–4–1 | | | |
| Total: | | 3–4–1 | | | |

=== College baseball ===
Record table
| Season | Team | Overall | Conference | Standing | Postseason |
|---|---|---|---|---|---|
Texas Longhorns (Independent) (1910)
| 1910 | Texas | 8-11-1 | | | |
| Texas: | | 8–11–1 (.425) | | | |
| Total: | | 8–11–1 (.425) | | | |
National champion Postseason invitational champion Conference regular season champion Conference regular season and conference tournament champion Division regular season champion Division regular season and conference tournament champion Conference tournament champion
