= H. R. Schenker =

American football and baseball coach

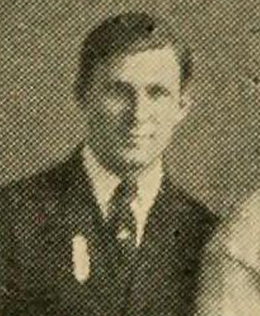
- Schenker pictured c. 1906 at Texas

Biographical details
- Born: April 21, 1882; Holyoke, Massachusetts, U.S.
- Died: May 3, 1922 (aged 40); Minneapolis, Minnesota, U.S.
- Education: Yale University

Coaching career (HC unless noted)

Football
- 1906: Texas
- 1907: Mercer

Baseball
- 1907: Texas

Head coaching record
- Overall: 12–4 (football); 16–8 (baseball)

Henry Richard Schenker (April 21, 1882 – May 3, 1922) was an American college football and college baseball coach. He served as the head football coach at the University of Texas at Austin in 1906 and at Mercer University in 1907, compiling a career college football head coaching record of 12–4. Schenker was also the head baseball coach at Texas in the spring of 1907, tallying a mark of 16–8.

Schenker was born on April 21, 1882, in Holyoke, Massachusetts. He graduated from Yale University in 1905. He died on May 3, 1922, in Minneapolis, Minnesota, after suffering from liver cancer.

== Head coaching record ==
=== Football ===
Year	Team	Overall	Conference	Standing	Bowl/playoffs
Texas Longhorns (Southern Intercollegiate Athletic Association) (1906)
1906	Texas	9–1	1–1	T–8th	
Texas:		9–1	1–1		
Mercer Baptists (Southern Intercollegiate Athletic Association) (1907)
1907	Mercer	3–3	0–3	11th	
Mercer:		3–3	0–3		
Total:		12–4			

=== Baseball ===
Record table
Season	Team	Overall	Conference	Standing	Postseason
Texas Longhorns (Southwestern Intercollegiate Athletic Association) (1907)
1907	Texas	16–8	15–6		
Texas:		16–8 (.667)	15–6 (.714)		
Total:		16–8 (.667)			
National champion Postseason invitational champion Conference regular season champion Conference regular season and conference tournament champion Division regular season champion Division regular season and conference tournament champion Conference tournament champion
