= Heinie Odom =

American baseball player (1900-1970)

Heine Odom
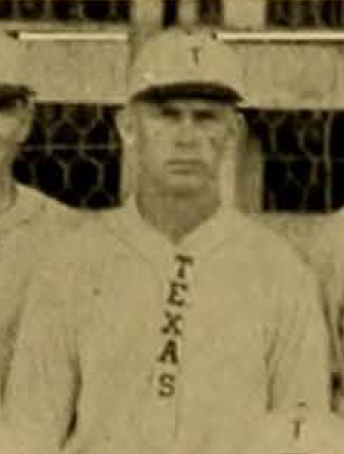
- Third baseman
- Born: October 13, 1900; Rusk, Texas
- Died: August 31, 1970 (aged 69); Rusk, Texas
- Batted: Switch Threw: Right

MLB debut
- April 22, 1925, for the New York Yankees

Last MLB appearance
- April 22, 1925, for the New York Yankees

MLB statistics
- Batting average: 1.000
- Hits: 1
- Home runs: 0
- Runs batted in: 0
- Stats at Baseball Reference

Teams
- New York Yankees (1925)

Herman Boyd "Heinie" Odom (October 13, 1900 – August 31, 1970) was an American baseball player.

Odom was born in 1900 in Rusk, Texas. He attended the University of Texas.

He began playing professional baseball in 1925 for the New York Yankees. He played one game for the Yankees on April 22, 1925. He hit a single in his one and only at bat and finished with a perfect 1.000 batting average. In the field, he had one putout and no errors, for a perfect 1.000 fielding percentage. He continued playing professional baseball until 1929, including stints with the St. Paul Saints of the American Association, the Beaumont Exporters of the Texas League, and the Oklahoma City Indians and Denver Bears of the Western League.

After his baseball career ended, he worked as a bookkeeper. He was a lifelong resident of Rusk, Texas. He died in Rusk in 1970 at age 69.
