= Charlie Gorin =

American baseball player (1928–2021)

- Pitcher
- Born: February 6, 1928; Waco, Texas, U.S.
- Died: February 21, 2021 (aged 93); Austin, Texas, U.S.
- Batted: Left Threw: Left

MLB debut
- May 29, 1954, for the Milwaukee Braves

Last MLB appearance
- April 17, 1955, for the Milwaukee Braves

MLB statistics
- Win–loss record: 0–1
- Earned run average: 3.60
- Strikeouts: 12
- Stats at Baseball Reference

Teams
- Milwaukee Braves (1954–1955)

Charles Perry Gorin (February 6, 1928 – February 21, 2021) was an American professional baseball player and left-handed pitcher who appeared in seven games—all in relief—in Major League Baseball during 1954 and 1955 with the Milwaukee Braves. Born in Waco, Texas, he was listed as 5 feet 10 inches (1.78 m) tall and 165 pounds (75 kg).

Gorin attended the University of Texas at Austin and was signed by the Boston Braves in 1950. His professional career was interrupted by service in the Korean War, which caused him to miss the 1952 and 1953 seasons. During his two major league auditions, Gorin compiled a 0–1 record with no saves, and allowed six hits, four earned runs and nine bases on balls in ten full innings pitched. He struck out 12 and compiled a 3.60 earned run average.

Gorin also played in the winter leagues, most notably in the Liga de Béisbol Profesional de Puerto Rico but also in Texas. His career in minor league baseball extended through the 1961 season.
