= Tom Hamilton (baseball) =

American baseball player

- Outfielder
- Born: September 29, 1924; Altoona, Kansas, U.S.
- Died: November 29, 1973 (aged 49); Tyler, Texas, U.S.
- Batted: Left Threw: Right

MLB debut
- September 4, 1952, for the Philadelphia Athletics

Last MLB appearance
- September 13, 1953, for the Philadelphia Athletics

MLB statistics
- Batting average: .197
- Home runs: 0
- Runs batted in: 6
- Stats at Baseball Reference

Teams
- Philadelphia Athletics (1952–1953)

Thomas Ball Hamilton (September 29, 1924 – November 29, 1973) was an American Major League Baseball player who played in 1952 and 1953 for the Philadelphia Athletics. He batted left-handed and threw right-handed, and he was 6 ft 4 in (1.93 m) tall and 213 pounds. Used primarily as a pinch hitter, Hamilton appeared in the field in only 14 of the 67 games he played.

Prior to playing professional baseball, Tom Hamilton attended the University of Texas at Austin, with whom he won the 1949 College World Series Most Outstanding Player award in the first year it was awarded. He is one of six players from University of Texas at Austin to win that award. The others are: J. L. Smith, Mickey Reichenbach, Calvin Schiraldi, Huston Street and David Maroul. In both 1948 and 1949, he was an All-SWC first baseman, and in 1949 he was also a first-team All-American. He hit .417 with a .848 slugging percentage in 1949.

He also played basketball at the University of Texas at Austin, where he was a center. He was an All-SWC basketball selection in 1950, and he was the first player in school history to score 1,000 points.

Hamilton was signed by the Athletics in 1950, as an amateur free agent. He made his big league debut a couple years later, on September 4, 1952. He appeared in nine games in 1952, collecting two hits in 10 at-bats for a .200 batting average. In 1953, he played in 58 games, although he had only 56 at-bats. He hit .196 with no home runs and five RBI that year. On September 13, he played his final big league game. Overall, Hamilton hit .197 with no home runs and six RBI in 66 career at-bats.

Although his big league career was over, his professional career was not. For example, on December 13, 1953, he was involved in a huge 11 player trade between the Athletics and New York Yankees. He was traded with Loren Babe, Harry Byrd, Carmen Mauro, and Eddie Robinson for Don Bollweg, Johnny Gray, Jim Robertson, Jim Finigan, Vic Power, and Bill Renna.

In 1971, he was elected to the University of Texas to Austin Hall of Honor.

He served as the baseball coach and athletic director at St. Edward's University at the time of his death in 1973. Following his death, he was buried in Cook-Walden Capital Parks Cemetery in Pflugerville, Texas.
