= Jim Gideon =

American baseball player (born 1953)

- Pitcher
- Born: September 26, 1953 (age 72); Taylor, Texas, U.S.
- Batted: Right Threw: Right

MLB debut
- September 14, 1975, for the Texas Rangers

Last MLB appearance
- September 14, 1975, for the Texas Rangers

MLB statistics
- Earned run average: 7.94
- Strikeouts: 2
- Stats at Baseball Reference

Teams
- Texas Rangers (1975)

Member of the College

Baseball Hall of Fame
- Induction: 2020

James Leslie Gideon (born September 26, 1953) is an American former Major League Baseball pitcher who played for one season. He pitched for the Texas Rangers for one game on September 14 during the 1975 season. He was traded along with Roy Smalley III, Mike Cubbage and Bill Singer from the Rangers to the Minnesota Twins for Bert Blyleven and Danny Thompson on June 1, 1976.
