= Calvin Murray =

American baseball player (born 1971)

- Center fielder
- Born: July 30, 1971 (age 54); Dallas, Texas, U.S.
- Batted: Right Threw: Right

MLB debut
- June 22, 1999, for the San Francisco Giants

Last MLB appearance
- October 1, 2004, for the Chicago Cubs

MLB statistics
- Batting average: .231
- Home runs: 8
- Runs batted in: 54
- Stats at Baseball Reference

Teams
- San Francisco Giants (1999–2002); Texas Rangers (2002); Chicago Cubs (2004)

Calvin Duane Murray (born July 30, 1971) is an American former baseball player who played outfield in the major leagues from 1999 to 2004 for the San Francisco Giants, Texas Rangers, and Chicago Cubs. He is a 1989 graduate of Dallas' W. T. White High School. He was drafted by the Cleveland Indians in the first round of the 1989 Major League Baseball draft, but did not sign, and instead attended the University of Texas.

He is the younger brother of Kevin Murray, who was a quarterback at Texas A&M University from 1983 to 1986. He is the uncle of 2018 Heisman Trophy winner Kyler Murray.
