= Kirk Dressendorfer =

American baseball player (born 1969)

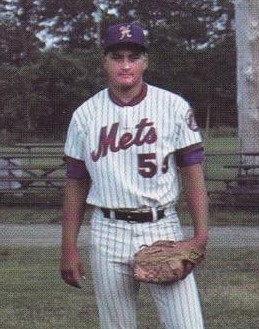
- Pitcher
- Born: April 8, 1969 (age 56); Houston, Texas, U.S.
- Batted: Right Threw: Right

MLB debut
- April 13, 1991, for the Oakland Athletics

Last MLB appearance
- May 21, 1991, for the Oakland Athletics

MLB statistics
- Win–loss record: 3–3
- Earned run average: 5.45
- Strikeouts: 17
- Stats at Baseball Reference

Teams
- Oakland Athletics (1991)

Member of the College

Baseball Hall of Fame
- Induction: 2009

Kirk Richard Dressendorfer (born April 8, 1969) is an American former professional baseball pitcher who played for the Oakland Athletics of Major League Baseball (MLB) in 1991. Dressendorfer attended and played college baseball at The University of Texas at Austin.

== Amateur career ==
Dressendorfer graduated from Pearland High School and was selected by the Baltimore Orioles in the 34th round of the 1987 MLB draft, but opted to attend The University of Texas at Austin. At UT he was a three-time All-American and All-SWC, posting a career record of 45–8, including a single-season record 15 complete games. In 1988, he played collegiate summer baseball with the Hyannis Mets of the Cape Cod Baseball League and was named a league all-star. Dressendorfer was inducted into the National College Baseball Hall of Fame in 2009.

== Professional career ==
Dressendorfer was then selected by the Oakland Athletics in the first round (36th pick overall) of the 1990 MLB draft. The Athletics possessed four first-round draft picks - including supplementals - due to compensation for the loss of free agents. The team took the unique choice to draft four different starting pitchers, Dressendorfer the last of a cohort that included Todd Van Poppel, Donald Peters, and Dave Zancanaro. Media dubbed the group the 'Four Aces'. However, Dressendorfer joined Van Poppel as the only two of the four to reach the major leagues. He started out with the Southern Oregon Timberjacks before making his Major League Baseball debut with the Athletics on April 13, 1991, pitching to a 4–2 victory over the Seattle Mariners, and appearing in his final MLB game on May 21, 1991. Over the next 6 years, he bounced around the minor leagues, playing at times for Tacoma, Modesto, Arizona, Huntsville, Edmonton, and Albuquerque. After the 1997 season he retired.

== Personal ==
Dressendorfer was the Director of Baseball Operations & Outreach for the Round Rock Express, the AAA affiliate of the Houston Astros. He now is a Business Development Project Manager for the After Point of Sales Services organization within Dell Inc.

== Sources ==
- Career statistics from Baseball Reference · Baseball Reference (Minors) · Retrosheet · Baseball Almanac
