= Pat Ankenman =

American baseball player (1912–1989)

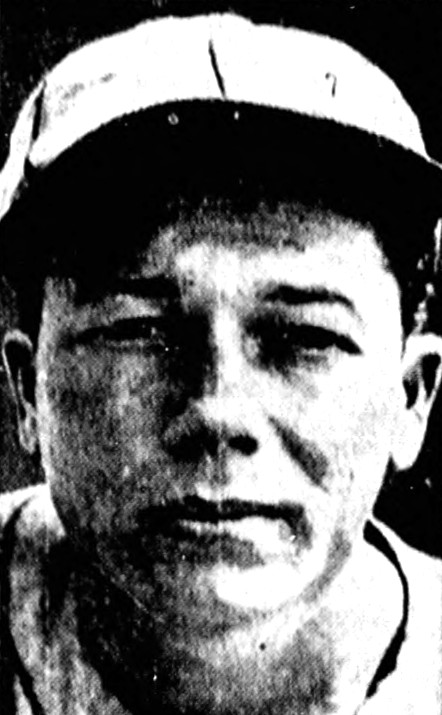
- Ankenman, circa 1939
- Second baseman
- Born: December 23, 1912; Houston, Texas, U.S.
- Died: January 13, 1989 (aged 76); Houston, Texas, U.S.
- Batted: Right Threw: Right

MLB debut
- April 16, 1936, for the St. Louis Cardinals

Last MLB appearance
- June 2, 1944, for the Brooklyn Dodgers

MLB statistics
- Batting average: .241
- Home runs: 0
- Runs scored: 2
- Stats at Baseball Reference

Teams
- St. Louis Cardinals (1936); Brooklyn Dodgers (1943–1944)

Frederick Norman "Pat" Ankenman (December 23, 1912 – January 13, 1989) was an American second baseman in Major League Baseball (MLB). He played for the St. Louis Cardinals and Brooklyn Dodgers during the 1936, 1943 and 1944 seasons. He also served as a manager in the minor leagues for the New Orleans Pelicans in 1942 and the Oklahoma City Indians in 1947 and 1948.

Ankenman was owner of Camp Ozark.
