= Keith Creel (baseball) =

American baseball player (born 1959)

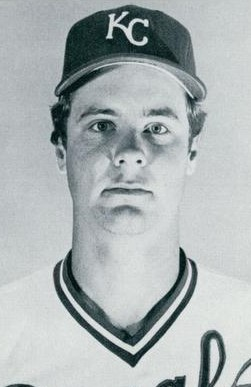
- Pitcher
- Born: February 4, 1959 (age 67); Dallas, Texas, U.S.
- Batted: Right Threw: Right

MLB debut
- May 25, 1982, for the Kansas City Royals

Last MLB appearance
- August 3, 1987, for the Texas Rangers

MLB statistics
- Win–loss record: 5–14
- Earned run average: 5.60
- Strikeouts: 80
- Stats at Baseball Reference

Teams
- Kansas City Royals (1982–1983); Cleveland Indians (1985); Texas Rangers (1987)

Keith Creel (born February 4, 1959) is an American former right-handed Major League Baseball pitcher who was a star pitcher at the University of Texas. The Kansas City Royals chose Creel with their first round pick of the 1980 draft (4th overall.) He never lived up to expectations and finished his career with a record of 5 wins, 14 losses, and a 5.60 ERA. He concluded his career as a relief pitcher by hurling 9.2 innings in his last season for the 1987 Texas Rangers. Prior to that time he had also pitched briefly with the Cleveland Indians.

Creel pitched for the Rangers in a game on July 19, 1987, in which they defeated the New York Yankees 20 to 3 and stopped Don Mattingly's streak of homering in eight straight games. Creel wore number 42 while playing for the Rangers. This number was later retired in honor of Jackie Robinson.

== Duncanville legacy ==
Creel was a star player in high school at Duncanville High School. He ranks 6th on the all-time list for most victories by a high school pitcher by recording 55 wins from 1974 through 1977. On March 22, 1977, Creel threw 15 innings against Irving High School and recorded 26 strikeouts. It is believed he threw close to 250 pitches in that contest. It is also believed that his coach had never heard of a pitch count.

Creel was named to the inaugural Duncanville ISD Hall of Honor in 2005. It is not known why he did not wear a Texas Rangers cap on his plaque.

His niece, Kadi Creel, is carrying on the Creel legacy and played basketball for the University of Houston and is now coaching at the middle school level in Duncanville.
