= 1982 College Baseball All-America Team =

This is a list of college baseball players named first team All-Americans for the 1982 NCAA Division I baseball season. From 1981 to 1990, there were three generally recognized All-America selectors for baseball: the American Baseball Coaches Association, Baseball America, and The Sporting News. In order to be considered a "consensus" All-American, a player must have been selected by at least two of these.

== Key ==
A	American Baseball Coaches Association
B	Baseball America
S	The Sporting News
	Member of the National College Baseball Hall of Fame
	Consensus All-American – selected by all three organizations
	Consensus All-American – selected by two organizations

== All-Americans ==
Position	Name	School	#	A	B	S	Other awards and honors
Pitcher	Bryan Duquette	Hawaii	2	✓	✓	—	
Pitcher	Jon Furman	Pepperdine	1	—	✓	—	
Pitcher	Randy Graham	Fresno State	2	✓	✓	—	
Pitcher	Don Heinkel	Wichita State	1	—	✓	—	
Pitcher	Joe Kucharski	South Carolina	1	✓	—	—	
Pitcher	Bryan Oelkers	Wichita State	1	—	✓	—	Baseball America Pitcher of the Year
Pitcher	Jeff Peterson	Saint Mary's	1	—	—	✓	
Pitcher	Todd Worrell	Biola	1	—	—	✓	
Catcher	Charlie O'Brien	Wichita State	1	—	✓	—	
Catcher	Joe Szekely	Texas A&M	1	—	—	✓	
Catcher	Robbie Wine	Oklahoma State	1	✓	—	—	
First baseman / DH	Steve Stanicek	Nebraska	2	—	✓	✓	
First baseman / DH	Phil Stephenson	Wichita State	2	✓	✓	—	
First baseman	Franklin Stubbs	Virginia Tech	1	—	—	✓	
Second baseman	Mark Wasinger	Old Dominion	3	✓	✓	✓	
Shortstop	Spike Owen	Texas	1	—	—	✓	
Shortstop / 3B	Augie Schmidt	New Orleans	3	✓	✓	✓	Golden Spikes Award
Third baseman	Keith Mucha	Oral Roberts	1	—	✓	—	
Third baseman	Jim Stewart	Virginia Tech	1	✓	—	—	
Outfielder	Jeff Ledbetter	Florida State	3	✓	✓	✓	Baseball America Player of the Year The Sporting News Player of the Year
Outfielder	John Morris	Seton Hall	3	✓	✓	✓	
Outfielder	Jim Paciorek	Michigan	2	✓	✓	—	
Outfielder	Kevin Romine	Arizona State	1	—	—	✓	
Designated hitter	Mike Rubel	Cal State Fullerton	1	✓	—	—	

== See also ==
- List of college baseball awards
