= 1982 NCAA Division I baseball season =

Baseball season

- Number of teams: 248

NCAA tournament

College World Series
- Champions: Miami (FL) (1st title)
- Runners-up: Wichita State (1st CWS Appearance)
- Winning coach: Ron Fraser (1st title)
- MOP: Dan Smith (Miami (FL))

Seasons
- ← 1981 1983 →

The 1982 NCAA Division I baseball season, play of college baseball in the United States organized by the National Collegiate Athletic Association (NCAA) began in the spring of 1982. The season progressed through the regular season and concluded with the 1982 College World Series. The College World Series, held for the thirty sixth time in 1982, consisted of one team from each of eight regional competitions and was held in Omaha, Nebraska at Johnny Rosenblatt Stadium as a double-elimination tournament. Miami (FL) claimed the championship for the first time.

== Conference winners ==
This is a partial list of conference champions from the 1982 season. The NCAA sponsored regional competitions to determine the College World Series participants. Seven regionals of four teams and one of six each competed in double-elimination tournaments, with the winners advancing to Omaha. 21 teams earned automatic bids by winning their conference championship while 13 teams earned at-large selections.

Conference	Regular season winner	Conference tournament	Tournament venue • city	Tournament winner
Atlantic Coast Conference	Clemson	1982 Atlantic Coast Conference baseball tournament	Boshamer Stadium • Chapel Hill, NC	North Carolina
Big Eight Conference	Oklahoma State	1982 Big Eight Conference baseball tournament	All Sports Stadium • Oklahoma City, OK	Oklahoma State
Big Ten Conference	East - Ohio State; West - Illinois	1982 Big Ten Conference baseball tournament	Illinois Field • Champaign, IL	Minnesota
Eastern 8	East - Rutgers; West - West Virginia	1982 Eastern 8 Conference Baseball Championship Series	Piscataway, New Jersey	West Virginia
EIBL	Navy	No tournament		
Mid-American Conference	East - Ohio; West - Western Michigan	1982 Mid-American Conference baseball tournament	Franklin County Stadium • Columbus, OH	Eastern Michigan
Midwestern City Conference	North - Detroit; South - Oral Roberts	1982 Midwestern City Conference baseball tournament	Detroit, MI	Oral Roberts
Pacific-10 Conference	North - Washington; South - Arizona State	No tournament		
Southeastern Conference	East - Florida; West - Ole Miss	1982 Southeastern Conference baseball tournament	Perry Field • Gainesville, FL	Florida
Southern Conference	The Citadel/Western Carolina	No tournament		
Southwest Conference	Texas	1982 Southwest Conference baseball tournament	Olsen Field • College Station, TX	Texas
Trans America Athletic Conference	East - Mercer; West - Hardin–Simmons/Northeast Louisiana	1982 Trans America Athletic Conference baseball tournament	Luther Williams Field • Macon, GA	Hardin–Simmons

== Conference standings ==
The following is an incomplete list of conference standings:

1982 Atlantic Coast Conference baseball standings
	Conf.				Overall
Team	W		L	PCT	W		L	PCT
Clemson ‍†‍‍	10	–	2	.833	37	–	22	.627
North Carolina ‍‍‡‍^{y}	7	–	5	.583	29	–	27	.518
Wake Forest ‍‍‍	6	–	5	.545	26	–	12	.684
NC State ‍‍‍	7	–	7	.500	24	–	13	.649
Georgia Tech ‍‍‍	6	–	8	.429	29	–	20	.592
Virginia ‍‍‍	5	–	7	.417	21	–	26	.447
Maryland ‍‍‍	4	–	7	.364	13	–	17	.433
Duke ‍‍‍	3	–	7	.300	16	–	13	.552
† – Conference champion ‡ – Tournament champion y – Invited to the NCAA tournament As of June 30, 1982; Rankings from Collegiate Baseball

1982 Big Eight Conference baseball standings
	Conf.				Overall
Team	W		L	PCT	W		L	PCT
No. 6 Oklahoma State ‍†‍‡‍^{y}	19	–	5	.792	57	–	16	.781
No. 19 Nebraska ‍‍‍	15	–	5	.750	44	–	13	.772
Oklahoma ‍‍‍	11	–	6	.647	35	–	25	.583
Missouri ‍‍‍	12	–	9	.571	38	–	17	.691
Kansas ‍‍‍	10	–	14	.417	23	–	27	.460
Iowa State ‍‍‍	6	–	18	.250	26	–	26	.500
Kansas State ‍‍‍	4	–	20	.167	29	–	27	.518
† – Conference champion ‡ – Tournament champion y – Invited to the NCAA tournament As of June 30, 1982; Rankings from Collegiate Baseball

1982 Big Ten Conference baseball standings
	Conf.						Overall
Team	W		L		T	PCT	W		L		T	PCT
East
Ohio State ^{x}‍‍‍	13	–	3	–	0	.813	45	–	14	–	0	.763
Michigan ‍‍‍	13	–	3	–	0	.813	44	–	10	–	0	.815
Purdue ‍‍‍	6	–	10	–	0	.375	36	–	23	–	0	.610
Michigan State ‍‍‍	6	–	10	–	0	.375	25	–	29	–	0	.463
Indiana ‍‍‍	2	–	14	–	0	.125	25	–	28	–	0	.472
West
Illinois ^{x}‍‍‍	14	–	2	–	0	.875	49	–	23	–	0	.681
No. 26 Minnesota ‍‍‡‍^{y}	8	–	8	–	0	.500	33	–	22	–	1	.598
Northwestern ‍‍‍	7	–	9	–	0	.438	25	–	27	–	1	.481
Wisconsin ‍‍‍	6	–	10	–	0	.375	23	–	28	–	0	.451
Iowa ‍‍‍	5	–	11	–	0	.313	31	–	23	–	0	.574
x – Division champion ‡ – Tournament champion y – Invited to the NCAA tournament As of June 30, 1982; Rankings from Collegiate Baseball

1982 Eastern 8 Conference baseball standings
	Conf.				Overall
Team	W		L	PCT	W		L	PCT
East
Rutgers ^{x}‍‍‍	5	–	3	.625	17	–	11	.607
UMass ‍‍‍	3	–	4	.429	15	–	20	.429
Rhode Island ‍‍‍	3	–	4	.429	17	–	19	.472
West
No. 16 West Virginia ^{x}‍‍‡‍^{y}	7	–	2	.778	24	–	23	.511
George Washington ‍‍‍	4	–	4	.500	16	–	21	.432
Duquesne ‍‍‍	3	–	5	.375	14	–	9	.609
Pittsburgh ‍‍‍	3	–	6	.333	11	–	19	.367
x – Division champion ‡ – Championship Series champion y – Invited to the NCAA tournament As of June 30, 1982; Rankings from Collegiate Baseball

1982 Eastern College Athletic Conference baseball standings
	Conf.						Overall
Team	W		L		T	PCT	W		L		T	PCT
New England
No. 3 Maine ‍‍‍^{y}	10	–	3	–	0	.769	35	–	13	–	0	.729
Fairfield ‍‍‍	7	–	5	–	0	.583	18	–	15	–	0	.545
Vermont ‍‍‍	7	–	6	–	0	.538	18	–	10	–	0	.643
Providence ‍‍‍	8	–	7	–	0	.533	22	–	23	–	1	.489
Boston College ‍‍‍	6	–	6	–	0	.500	11	–	11	–	0	.500
New Hampshire ‍‍‍	6	–	8	–	0	.429	17	–	14	–	0	.548
Holy Cross ‍‍‍	7	–	10	–	1	.417	13	–	5	–	0	.722
Northeastern ‍‍‍	4	–	7	–	1	.375	8	–	17	–	1	.327
Connecticut ‍‍‍	4	–	7	–	0	.364	9	–	22	–	0	.290
South
Seton Hall ‍‍‍^{y}	16	–	0	–	0	1.000	41	–	13	–	0	.759
Old Dominion ‍‍‍^{y}	12	–	3	–	0	.800	38	–	14	–	0	.731
Georgetown ‍‍‍	7	–	3	–	0	.700	21	–	19	–	0	.525
East Carolina ‍‍‍^{y}	9	–	4	–	0	.692	34	–	15	–	0	.694
James Madison ‍‍‍	15	–	8	–	0	.652	40	–	15	–	0	.727
Canisius ‍‍‍	2	–	4	–	0	.333	14	–	15	–	0	.483
NYIT ‍‍‍		–		–	0	–	21	–	13	–	0	.618
George Mason ‍‍‍		–		–	0	–	19	–	24	–	0	.442
x – Division champion ‡ – Tournament champion y – Invited to the NCAA tournament As of June 30, 1982; Rankings from Collegiate Baseball

1982 NCAA Division I baseball independents standings
	Conf.				Overall
Team	W		L	PCT	W		L	PCT
No. 7 South Carolina ‍‍‍^{y}		–		–	45	–	13	.776
No. 22 Florida State ‍‍‍^{y}		–		–	56	–	17	.767
No. 11 New Orleans ‍‍‍^{y}		–		–	49	–	16	.754
No. 1 Miami (FL) ‍‍‍^{y}		–		–	54	–	18	.750
No. 12 Stetson ‍‍‍^{y}		–		–	40	–	18	.690
Campbell ‍‍‍		–		–	27	–	13	.675
Richmond ‍‍‍		–		–	20	–	15	.571
Louisville ‍‍‍		–		–	22	–	17	.564
Northern Iowa ‍‍‍		–		–	11	–	16	.407
Villanova ‍‍‍		–		–	9	–	18	.333
Georgia State ‍‍‍		–		–	17	–	38	.309
Lafayette ‍‍‍		–		–	6	–	18	.250
Hofstra ‍‍‍		–		–	5	–	22	.185
y – Invited to the NCAA tournament As of June 30, 1982; Rankings from Collegiate Baseball

1982 Mid-American Conference baseball standings
	Conf.						Overall
Team	W		L		T	PCT	W		L		T	PCT
Eastern Division
Ohio ^{x}‍‍‍	10	–	5	–	0	.667	26	–	23	–	1	.530
Toledo ‍‍‍	10	–	6	–	0	.625	26	–	28	–	1	.482
Kent State ‍‍‍	8	–	8	–	0	.500	35	–	23	–	0	.603
Miami ‍‍‍	6	–	10	–	0	.375	16	–	25	–	0	.390
Bowling Green ‍‍‍	5	–	10	–	0	.333	29	–	23	–	1	.557
Western Division
Western Michigan ^{x}‍‍‍	12	–	4	–	0	.750	34	–	17	–	0	.667
Eastern Michigan ‍‍‡‍^{y}	9	–	4	–	0	.692	39	–	23	–	2	.625
Central Michigan ‍‍‍	8	–	4	–	0	.667	24	–	17	–	0	.585
Northern Illinois ‍‍‍	4	–	9	–	0	.308	19	–	24	–	1	.443
Ball State ‍‍‍	0	–	12	–	0	.000	10	–	21	–	0	.323
x – Division champion ‡ – Tournament champion y – Invited to the NCAA tournament As of June 30, 1982; Rankings from Collegiate Baseball

1982 Missouri Valley Conference baseball standings
	Conf.				Overall
Team	W		L	PCT	W		L	PCT
Eastern Division
Indiana State ^{x}‍‍‍	12	–	4	.750	40	–	20	.667
Southern Illinois ‍‍‍	8	–	8	.500	32	–	20	.615
Bradley ‍‍‍	6	–	6	.500	23	–	29	.442
Illinois State ‍‍‍	4	–	8	.333	24	–	19	.558
Western Division
No. 2 Wichita State ^{x}‍‍‡‍^{y}	15	–	1	.938	73	–	14	.839
Creighton ‍‍‍	1	–	7	.125	32	–	23	.582
New Mexico State ‍‍‍	0	–	8	.000	23	–	27	.460
x – Division champion ‡ – Tournament champion y – Invited to the NCAA tournament As of June 30, 1982; Rankings from Collegiate Baseball

1982 Pacific-10 Conference baseball standings
	Conf.						Overall
Team	W		L		T	PCT	W		L		T	PCT
Northern
Oregon State ^{x}‍‍‍	16	–	8	–	0	.667	29	–	15	–	0	.659
Washington State ‍‍‍	16	–	8	–	0	.667	34	–	16	–	0	.680
Eastern Washington ‍‍‍	15	–	9	–	0	.625	24	–	28	–	0	.462
Portland State ‍‍‍	11	–	13	–	0	.458	27	–	23	–	0	.540
Gonzaga ‍‍‍	10	–	14	–	0	.417	30	–	28	–	0	.517
Washington ‍‍‍	10	–	14	–	0	.417	22	–	24	–	0	.478
Portland ‍‍‍	6	–	18	–	0	.250	19	–	24	–	1	.443
Southern
No. 9 Arizona State ^{x}‍‍‍^{y}	23	–	5	–	0	.821	58	–	15	–	0	.795
No. 5 Stanford ‍‍‍^{y}	20	–	10	–	0	.667	49	–	18	–	1	.728
Arizona ‍‍‍	15	–	14	–	0	.517	32	–	22	–	0	.593
UCLA ‍‍‍	11	–	19	–	0	.367	38	–	27	–	0	.585
California ‍‍‍	9	–	18	–	0	.333	29	–	32	–	0	.475
Southern California ‍‍‍	9	–	21	–	0	.300	23	–	36	–	0	.390
x – Division champion y – Invited to the NCAA tournament As of June 30, 1982; Rankings from Collegiate Baseball

1982 Southeastern Conference baseball standings
	Conf.				Overall
Team	W		L	PCT	W		L	PCT
Eastern Division
Florida ^{x}‍‍‡‍^{y}	14	–	8	.636	34	–	24	.586
Tennessee ‍‍‍	13	–	9	.591	29	–	17	.630
Georgia ‍‍‍	12	–	10	.545	28	–	29	.491
Vanderbilt ‍‍‍	11	–	12	.478	28	–	17	.622
Kentucky ‍‍‍	6	–	17	.261	23	–	32	.418
Western Division
Ole Miss ^{x}‍‍‍	15	–	6	.714	33	–	19	.635
Alabama ‍‍‍	12	–	10	.545	32	–	21	.604
Mississippi State ‍‍‍	11	–	13	.458	28	–	23	.549
LSU ‍‍‍	9	–	13	.409	26	–	25	.510
Auburn ‍‍‍	8	–	13	.381	27	–	20	.574
x – Division champion ‡ – Tournament champion y – Invited to the NCAA tournament As of June 30, 1982; Rankings from Collegiate Baseball

1982 Southern Conference baseball standings
	Conf.				Overall
Team	W		L	PCT	W		L	PCT
No. 23 The Citadel ‍†‍‍^{y}	12	–	4	.750	40	–	8	.833
Western Carolina ‍†‍‍	12	–	4	.750	28	–	12	.700
East Tennessee State ‍‍‍	10	–	4	.714	34	–	19	.642
Appalachian State ‍‍‍	8	–	8	.500	30	–	21	.588
Marshall ‍‍‍	8	–	8	.500	17	–	21	.447
VMI ‍‍‍	6	–	10	.375	11	–	29	.275
Furman ‍‍‍	4	–	10	.286	15	–	19	.441
Chattanooga ‍‍‍	4	–	10	.286	12	–	20	.375
Davidson ‍‍‍	2	–	12	.143	13	–	26	.333
y – Invited to the NCAA tournament As of June 30, 1982; Rankings from Collegiate Baseball

1982 Southwest Conference baseball standings
	Conf.				Overall
Team	W		L	PCT	W		L	PCT
No. 4 Texas ‍†‍‡‍^{y}	12	–	4	.750	59	–	6	.908
No. 21 Houston ‍‍‍^{y}	13	–	6	.684	42	–	14	.750
Arkansas ‍‍‍	13	–	8	.619	40	–	15	.727
Texas A&M ‍‍‍	10	–	10	.500	33	–	19	.635
Texas Tech ‍‍‍	9	–	12	.429	21	–	22	.488
Baylor ‍‍‍	9	–	12	.429	25	–	22	.532
Rice ‍‍‍	8	–	13	.381	34	–	23	.596
TCU ‍‍‍	4	–	15	.211	16	–	25	.390
† – Conference champion ‡ – Tournament champion y – Invited to the NCAA tournament As of June 30, 1982; Rankings from Collegiate Baseball

1982 Trans America Athletic Conference baseball standings
	Conf.				Overall
Team	W		L	PCT	W		L	PCT
East
Mercer ^{x}‍†‍‍	8	–	2	.800	35	–	22	.614
Georgia Southern ‍‍‍	5	–	5	.500	34	–	33	.507
Arkansas–Little Rock ‍‍‍	2	–	8	.200	11	–	31	.262
West
Northeast Louisiana ^{x}‍‍‍	7	–	5	.583	22	–	29	.431
Hardin–Simmons ^{x}‍‍‡‍^{y}	7	–	5	.583	23	–	32	.418
Centenary ^{x}‍‍‍	7	–	5	.583	18	–	26	.409
Northwestern State ‍‍‍	3	–	9	.250	18	–	23	.439
x – Division champion † – Conference champion ‡ – Tournament champion y – Invited to the NCAA tournament As of June 30, 1982; Rankings from Collegiate Baseball

1982 NCAA Division I baseball independents standings
	Conf.				Overall
Team	W		L	PCT	W		L	PCT
No. 7 South Carolina ‍‍‍^{y}		–		–	45	–	13	.776
No. 22 Florida State ‍‍‍^{y}		–		–	56	–	17	.767
No. 11 New Orleans ‍‍‍^{y}		–		–	49	–	16	.754
No. 1 Miami (FL) ‍‍‍^{y}		–		–	54	–	18	.750
No. 12 Stetson ‍‍‍^{y}		–		–	40	–	18	.690
Campbell ‍‍‍		–		–	27	–	13	.675
Richmond ‍‍‍		–		–	20	–	15	.571
Louisville ‍‍‍		–		–	22	–	17	.564
Northern Iowa ‍‍‍		–		–	11	–	16	.407
Villanova ‍‍‍		–		–	9	–	18	.333
Georgia State ‍‍‍		–		–	17	–	38	.309
Lafayette ‍‍‍		–		–	6	–	18	.250
Hofstra ‍‍‍		–		–	5	–	22	.185
y – Invited to the NCAA tournament As of June 30, 1982; Rankings from Collegiate Baseball

== College World Series ==
The 1982 season marked the thirty sixth NCAA baseball tournament, which culminated with the eight team College World Series. The College World Series was held in Omaha, Nebraska. The eight teams played a double-elimination format, with Miami (FL) claiming their first championship with a 9–3 win over Wichita State in the final.

Upper round 1
Miami (FL)	7
Maine	2
Wichita State	7
Cal State Fullerton	0
Texas	9
Oklahoma State	1
Stanford	15
South Carolina	4

Upper round 2
Miami (FL)	4
Wichita State	3
Texas	8^{12}
Stanford	6
Lower round 1
Maine	6
Cal State Fullerton	0
Oklahoma State	10
South Carolina	8

Upper final
Miami (FL)	2
Texas	1
Lower round 2
Stanford	5
Maine	8
Wichita State	13
Oklahoma State	2

Semifinals
Miami (FL)	10
Maine	4
Texas	4
Wichita State	8

Final
Miami (FL)	9
Wichita State	3
