= 1982 Miami Hurricanes baseball team =

American college baseball season

1982 Miami Hurricanes baseball

National champions
- Conference: Independent
- CB: No. 1
- Record: 55–17–1
- Head coach: Ron Fraser (20th year)
- Assistant coaches: Skip Bertman; Dave Scott; Dan Canevari
- Home stadium: Mark Light Field

1982 NCAA Division I baseball independents standings
| | Conf. | | | | Overall |
| Team | W | | L | PCT | W | | L | PCT |
|---|---|---|---|---|---|---|---|---|
| No. 7 South Carolina ‍‍‍^{y} | | – | | – | 45 | – | 13 | .776 |
| No. 22 Florida State ‍‍‍^{y} | | – | | – | 56 | – | 17 | .767 |
| No. 11 New Orleans ‍‍‍^{y} | | – | | – | 49 | – | 16 | .754 |
| No. 1 Miami (FL) ‍‍‍^{y} | | – | | – | 54 | – | 18 | .750 |
| No. 12 Stetson ‍‍‍^{y} | | – | | – | 40 | – | 18 | .690 |
| Campbell ‍‍‍ | | – | | – | 27 | – | 13 | .675 |
| Richmond ‍‍‍ | | – | | – | 20 | – | 15 | .571 |
| Louisville ‍‍‍ | | – | | – | 22 | – | 17 | .564 |
| Northern Iowa ‍‍‍ | | – | | – | 11 | – | 16 | .407 |
| Villanova ‍‍‍ | | – | | – | 9 | – | 18 | .333 |
| Georgia State ‍‍‍ | | – | | – | 17 | – | 38 | .309 |
| Lafayette ‍‍‍ | | – | | – | 6 | – | 18 | .250 |
| Hofstra ‍‍‍ | | – | | – | 5 | – | 22 | .185 |
y – Invited to the NCAA tournament As of June 30, 1982; Rankings from Collegiate Baseball

The 1982 Miami Hurricanes baseball team represented the University of Miami in the 1982 NCAA Division I baseball season. The team was coached by Ron Fraser in his 20th season.

The Hurricanes won the College World Series, defeating the Wichita State Shockers in the championship game.

== Roster ==
1982 Miami Hurricanes roster
| Pitchers: Jeff Conley; Eddie Escribano; Scott Heaton; Mike Kasprzak; Eddie Kruijs; Camilo Pascual; Danny Smith; Kevin Smith; Sam Sorce; Rob Souza; Bob Williams | Infielders: Calvin James; Phil Lane; Steve Lusby; Greg Pompos; Don Rowland; Tom Sacco; Thomas Buckler; Donald Hensley | Outfielders: Orlando Artiles; Dave Carr; Doug Shields; Javier Velazquez; Mickey Williams; Catchers: Nelson Santovenia; Bob Walker |

== Schedule ==
1982 Miami Hurricanes baseball game log
Regular season
February

| Date | Opponent | Site/stadium | Score | Overall record |
|---|---|---|---|---|
| February 5 | California | Mark Light Field | 10–2 | 1–0 |
| February 6 | California | Mark Light Field | 8–1 | 2–0 |
| February 7 | California | Mark Light Field | 10–4 | 3–0 |
| February 11 | Seton Hall | Mark Light Field | 3–1 | 4–0 |
| February 12 | Seton Hall | Mark Light Field | 13–14 | 4–1 |
| February 13 | Florida | Mark Light Field | 7–3 | 5–1 |
| February 14 | Florida | Mark Light Field | 6–2 | 6–1 |
| February 15 | Seton Hall | Mark Light Field | 7–2 | 7–1 |
| February 18 | Biscayne | Mark Light Field | 7–1 | 8–1 |
| February 19 | North Carolina | Mark Light Field | 17–4 | 9–1 |
| February 20 | North Carolina | Mark Light Field | 5–6 | 9–2 |
| February 21 | North Carolina | Mark Light Field | 14–4 | 10–2 |
| February 22 | Mercer | Mark Light Field | 15–8 | 11–2 |
| February 23 | Mercer | Mark Light Field | 10–2 | 12–2 |
| February 24 | Mercer | Mark Light Field | 9–0 | 13–2 |
| February 26 | New Orleans | Mark Light Field | 9–6 | 14–2 |
| February 27 | New Orleans | Mark Light Field | 4–5 | 14–3 |
| February 27 | New Orleans | Mark Light Field | 6–10 | 14–4 |

March

| Date | Opponent | Site/stadium | Score | Overall record |
|---|---|---|---|---|
| March 3 | Florida International | Mark Light Field | 6–10 | 14–5 |
| March 5 | Florida Atlantic | Mark Light Field | 18–4 | 15–5 |
| March 6 | at South Florida | Red McEwen Field | 14–6 | 16–5 |
| March 9 | Biscayne | Mark Light Field | 13–1 | 17–5 |
| March 12 | South Carolina | Mark Light Field | 2–1 | 18–5 |
| March 13 | South Carolina | Mark Light Field | 4–3 | 19–5 |
| March 14 | South Carolina | Mark Light Field | 8–6 | 20–5 |
| March 15 | South Carolina | Mark Light Field | 4–3 | 21–5 |
| March 16 | George Washington | Mark Light Field | 12–0 | 22–5 |
| March 17 | Lewis | Mark Light Field | 10–4 | 23–5 |
| March 18 | George Washington | Mark Light Field | 16–2 | 24–5 |
| March 19 | Bowling Green | Mark Light Field | 15–2 | 25–5 |
| March 20 | Lewis | Mark Light Field | 9–2 | 26–5 |
| March 21 | William Paterson | Mark Light Field | 17–7 | 27–5 |
| March 22 | Bowling Green | Mark Light Field | 14–1 | 28–5 |
| March 24 | Bowling Green | Mark Light Field | 12–0 | 29–5 |
| March 26 | at Florida State | Seminole Field | 6–5 | 30–5 |
| March 27 | at Florida State | Seminole Field | 3–5 | 30–6 |
| March 28 | at Florida State | Seminole Field | 3–9 | 30–7 |
| March 31 | Florida International | Mark Light Field | 1–2 | 30–8 |

April

| Date | Opponent | Site/stadium | Score | Overall record |
|---|---|---|---|---|
| April 1 | Eckerd | Mark Light Field | 9–11 | 3-–9 |
| April 2 | South Florida | Mark Light Field | 5–4 | 31–9 |
| April 3 | South Florida | Mark Light Field | 15–5 | 32–9 |
| April 4 | at Florida International | | 13–12 | 33–9 |
| April 8 | Stetson | Mark Light Field | 3–2 | 34–9 |
| April 9 | Stetson | Mark Light Field | 14–7 | 35–9 |
| April 10 | Stetson | Mark Light Field | 2–4 | 35–10 |
| April 11 | at Florida International | | 0–5 | 35–11 |
| April 14 | at South Carolina | Sarge Frye Field | 11–3 | 36–11 |
| April 15 | at South Carolina | Sarge Frye Field | 12–8 | 37–11 |
| April 16 | at South Carolina | Sarge Frye Field | 2–6 | 37–12 |
| April 17 | at South Carolina | Sarge Frye Field | 19–3 | 38–12 |
| April 18 | at Florida | Perry Field | 2–6 | 38–13 |
| April 19 | at Florida | Perry Field | 8–7 | 39–13 |
| April 22 | South Alabama | Mark Light Field | 7–2 | 40–13 |
| April 30 | Florida International | Mark Light Field | 6–2 | 41–13 |

May

| Date | Opponent | Site/stadium | Score | Overall record |
|---|---|---|---|---|
| May 6 | Florida Atlantic | Mark Light Field | 4–3 | 42–13 |
| May 7 | Florida State | Mark Light Field | 11–5 | 43–13 |
| May 8 | Florida State | Mark Light Field | 2–9 | 43–14 |
| May 9 | Florida State | Mark Light Field | 7–7 | 43–14–1 |
| May 11 | at Georgia Southern | Mark Light Field | 5–6 | 43–15–1 |
| May 12 | at Georgia Southern | Mark Light Field | 14–5 | 44–15–1 |
| May 14 | at Georgia Tech | Rose Bowl Field | 10–7 | 45–15–1 |
| May 15 | at Georgia Tech | Rose Bowl Field | 13–3 | 46–15–1 |
| May 21 | at Arizona State | Packard Stadium | 8–6 | 47–15–1 |
| May 22 | at Arizona State | Packard Stadium | 1–3 | 47–16–1 |
| May 23 | at Arizona State | Packard Stadium | 7–8 | 47–17–1 |

Postseason
NCAA tournament: Atlantic Regional

| Date | Opponent | Site/stadium | Score | Overall record |
|---|---|---|---|---|
| May 29 | vs. Stetson | Mark Light Field | 18–2 | 48–17–1 |
| May 29 | vs. South Florida | Mark Light Field | 9–4 | 49–17–1 |
| May 30 | vs. Stetson | Mark Light Field | 15–3 | 50–17–1 |

NCAA tournament: College World Series

| Date | Opponent | Site/stadium | Score | Overall record |
|---|---|---|---|---|
| June 4 | vs. Maine | Rosenblatt Stadium | 7–2 | 51–17–1 |
| June 7 | vs. Wichita State | Rosenblatt Stadium | 4–3 | 52–17–1 |
| June 10 | vs. Texas | Rosenblatt Stadium | 2–1 | 53–17–1 |
| June 11 | vs. Maine | Rosenblatt Stadium | 10–4 | 54–17–1 |
| June 12 | vs. Wichita State | Rosenblatt Stadium | 9–3 | 55–17–1 |

== Awards and honors ==
Phil Lane

- College World Series All-Tournament Team

Nelson Santovenia

- College World Series All-Tournament Team

Danny Smith

- College World Series Most Outstanding Player
- All-America First Team

== Hurricanes in the 1982 MLB draft ==
The following members of the Miami baseball program were drafted in the 1982 Major League Baseball draft.

| Player | Position | Round | Overall | MLB Team |
|---|---|---|---|---|
| Mike Kasprzak | RHP | 18th | 459th | Houston Astros |
| Sam Sorce | RHP | 24th | 612th | Texas Rangers |
| Doug Shields | OF | 29th | 731st | Texas Rangers |
