= 1982 Eastern 8 Conference baseball championship series =

American college baseball tournament

1982 Eastern 8 Conference baseball tournament
- Teams: 2
- Format: Best of 3 series
- Finals site: Piscataway, New Jersey
- Champions: West Virginia (1st title)
- Winning coach: Dale Ramsburg (1st title)
- MVP: Jeff Wilson (West Virginia)

1982 Eastern 8 Conference baseball standings
	Conf.				Overall
Team	W		L	PCT	W		L	PCT
East
Rutgers ^{x}‍‍‍	5	–	3	.625	17	–	11	.607
UMass ‍‍‍	3	–	4	.429	15	–	20	.429
Rhode Island ‍‍‍	3	–	4	.429	17	–	19	.472
West
No. 16 West Virginia ^{x}‍‍‡‍^{y}	7	–	2	.778	24	–	23	.511
George Washington ‍‍‍	4	–	4	.500	16	–	21	.432
Duquesne ‍‍‍	3	–	5	.375	14	–	9	.609
Pittsburgh ‍‍‍	3	–	6	.333	11	–	19	.367
x – Division champion ‡ – Championship Series champion y – Invited to the NCAA tournament As of June 30, 1982; Rankings from Collegiate Baseball

The 1982 Eastern 8 Conference Baseball Championship Series was held on May 7 and 8, 1982 to determine the champion of the NCAA Division I Eastern 8 Conference, renamed later in 1982 as the Atlantic 10 Conference, for the 1982 NCAA Division I baseball season. This was the fourth iteration of the event, and was held on the campus of Rutgers in Piscataway, New Jersey. West Virginia won the championship two games to one and earned the conference's automatic bid to the 1982 NCAA Division I baseball tournament. For the first time, a Most Valuable Player was named, with Jeff Wilson of West Virginia earning the honor.

== Format and seeding ==
The regular season winners of each of the conference's two divisions advanced to a best of three series.

Team	W	L	Pct	GB
East Division
Rutgers	5	3	.625	—
UMass	3	4	.429	1.5
Rhode Island	3	4	.429	1.5

Team	W	L	Pct	GB
Western Division
West Virginia	7	2	.778	—
George Washington	4	4	.500	2.5
Duquesne	3	5	.375	3.5
Pittsburgh	3	6	.333	4

== Results ==
Game One

May 7, 1982
Team	R
Rutgers	2
West Virginia	8

Game Two

May 7, 1982
Team	R
West Virginia	5
Rutgers	6

Game Three

May 8, 1982
Team	R
Rutgers	5
West Virginia	7
