= Gary Ward (baseball coach) =

American former baseball coach

Biographical details
- Born: September 9, 1940 (age 86); Ramona, Oklahoma, U.S.

Playing career

Basketball
- 1958–1959: NE Oklahoma A&M
- 1959–1962: New Mexico State

Baseball
- 1959: NE Oklahoma A&M
- 1960–1962: New Mexico State
- Position: Pitcher

Coaching career (HC unless noted)
- Collinsville (OK): 1963–1969
- Yavapai College: 1971–1977
- Oklahoma State: 1978–1996
- New Mexico State (H): 2000
- New Mexico State: 2001–2002
- New Mexico State (H): 2003–2014

Head coaching record
- Overall: 1022–361–1 (NCAA D-1); 240–83 (NJCAA)

Accomplishments and honors

Championships
- 2× NJCAA National Champion (1975, 1977); 2× Big Eight West Division Champion (1979, 1980); 14× Big Eight Conference (1982–1995); 19× Big Eight Tournament (1978–1996)
- College Baseball Hall of Fame; Inducted in 2008

Gary Ward (born September 9, 1940) is an American former college baseball coach. He was the head baseball coach at Oklahoma State University from 1978 to 1996, compiling a record of 953–313–1. Ward won 16 Big Eight Conference championships at OSU, including 14 in a row from 1982 to 1995. He led his team to 18 40-win seasons, and 12 times his teams finished in the top 10. He later became the head baseball coach at New Mexico State University. During his tenure, he became only the 24th coach in college baseball history to gain 1,000 career wins.

From 1971 to 1979, he served as the head baseball coach at Yavapai Junior College. He compiled a 240–83 record, including two national championships in 1975 and 1977. From 1963 to 1969, he was the head baseball and basketball coach at Collinsville (OK) High School. He played baseball and basketball at New Mexico State.

Ward now serves as the chairman of the advisory board for 3D Sports Partners, Inc.

== Head coaching record ==
=== College ===
Record table
Season	Team	Overall	Conference	Standing	Postseason
Oklahoma State Cowboys (Big Eight Conference) (1979–1996)
1978	Oklahoma State	40–22	7–5	2nd (West)	Midwest Regional
1979	Oklahoma State	33–19	12–8	T-1st (West)	Big Eight tournament
1980	Oklahoma State	43–10	17–3	1st (West)	Big Eight tournament
1981	Oklahoma State	52–17	12–6	2nd	College World Series
1982	Oklahoma State	57–16	19–5	1st	College World Series
1983	Oklahoma State	48–16	11–3	1st	College World Series
1984	Oklahoma State	61–15	15–3	1st	College World Series
1985	Oklahoma State	58–16–1	19–4	1st	College World Series
1986	Oklahoma State	56–15	18–5	1st	College World Series
1987	Oklahoma State	59–13	15–6	1st	College World Series
1988	Oklahoma State	61–8	21–3	1st	Midwest Regional
1989	Oklahoma State	48–19	18–6	1st	Midwest Regional
1990	Oklahoma State	56–17	18–6	1st	College World Series
1991	Oklahoma State	47–20	17–7	1st	Central Regional
1992	Oklahoma State	49–16	17–7	1st	Midwest Regional
1993	Oklahoma State	45–17	16–8	1st	College World Series
1994	Oklahoma State	49–17	21–6	1st	Midwest Regional
1995	Oklahoma State	46–19	18–10	1st	Midwest I Regional
1996	Oklahoma State	45–21	17–9	2nd	College World Series
Oklahoma State:		953–313–1	308–113		
New Mexico State Aggies (Sun Belt Conference) (2001–2002)
2001	New Mexico State	32–23	9–16	10th	
2002	New Mexico State	37–25	10–14	6th	NCAA Regional
New Mexico State:		69–48	19–30		
Total:		1022–361–1			
National champion Postseason invitational champion Conference regular season champion Conference regular season and conference tournament champion Division regular season champion Division regular season and conference tournament champion Conference tournament champion
