= 1982 Trans America Athletic Conference baseball tournament =

American college baseball tournament

- Teams: 4
- Format: Double-elimination
- Finals site: Luther Williams Field; Macon, Georgia
- Champions: Hardin–Simmons (1st title)
- Winning coach: Larry Martindale (1st title)

1982 Trans America Athletic Conference baseball standings
	Conf.				Overall
Team	W		L	PCT	W		L	PCT
East
Mercer ^{x}‍†‍‍	8	–	2	.800	35	–	22	.614
Georgia Southern ‍‍‍	5	–	5	.500	34	–	33	.507
Arkansas–Little Rock ‍‍‍	2	–	8	.200	11	–	31	.262
West
Northeast Louisiana ^{x}‍‍‍	7	–	5	.583	22	–	29	.431
Hardin–Simmons ^{x}‍‍‡‍^{y}	7	–	5	.583	23	–	32	.418
Centenary ^{x}‍‍‍	7	–	5	.583	18	–	26	.409
Northwestern State ‍‍‍	3	–	9	.250	18	–	23	.439
x – Division champion † – Conference champion ‡ – Tournament champion y – Invited to the NCAA tournament As of June 30, 1982; Rankings from Collegiate Baseball

The 1982 Trans America Athletic Conference baseball tournament was held at Luther Williams Field on the campus of Mercer University in Macon, Georgia, from April 29 through May 1. This was the fourth tournament championship held by the Trans America Athletic Conference, in its fourth year of existence. Hardin–Simmons won their first tournament championship and advanced to the 1982 NCAA Division I baseball tournament.

== Seeding and format ==
The TAAC brought the two division winners and second place team from each division to the tournament. Each division winner played the opposite division runner up in the first round in the four team double elimination tournament. Hardin-Simmons and Northeast Louisiana claimed the West's first and second seeds, respectively, by tiebreaker.

Team	W	L	Pct.	GB	Seed
East
Mercer	8	2	.800	—	1E
Georgia Southern	5	5	.500	3	2E
Arkansas–Little Rock	2	8	.200	6	—

Team	W	L	Pct.	GB	Seed
West
Hardin–Simmons	7	5	.583	—	1W
Northeast Louisiana	7	5	.583	—	2W
Centenary	7	5	.583	—	—
Northwestern State	3	9	.250	4	—

== Bracket ==
Upper round 1
1E	Mercer	9
2W	Northeast Louisiana	2
1W	Hardin–Simmons	7
2E	Georgia Southern	5
Lower round 1
2W	Northeast Louisiana	7
2E	Georgia Southern	6

Upper final
1E	Mercer	2
1W	Hardin–Simmons	3
Lower final
1E	Mercer	12
2W	Northeast Louisiana	2

Final
1W	Hardin–Simmons	4	11
1E	Mercer	8	9

== All-Tournament Team ==
The following players were named to the All-Tournament Team. No MVP was named until 1985.

POS	Player	School
P	Scott Barnhouse	Mercer
P	Mike Richard	Hardin–Simmons
C	Lawrence Walter	Mercer
1B	Dave Pregon	Georgia Southern
2B	Dave Mahoney	Mercer
SS	Bobby Doe	Hardin–Simmons
3B	Byron Roberts	Hardin–Simmons
OF	Frank Millerd	Mercer
OF	Mike Montgomery	Mercer
OF	Mark Reedy	Hardin–Simmons
DH	Scott Stone	Northeast Louisiana
