= 1982 Southwest Conference baseball tournament =

- Teams: 4
- Format: Double-elimination tournament
- Finals site: Olsen Field; College Station, Texas
- Champions: Texas (4th title)
- Winning coach: Cliff Gustafson (4th title)

1982 Southwest Conference baseball standings
	Conf.				Overall
Team	W		L	PCT	W		L	PCT
No. 4 Texas ‍†‍‡‍^{y}	12	–	4	.750	59	–	6	.908
No. 21 Houston ‍‍‍^{y}	13	–	6	.684	42	–	14	.750
Arkansas ‍‍‍	13	–	8	.619	40	–	15	.727
Texas A&M ‍‍‍	10	–	10	.500	33	–	19	.635
Texas Tech ‍‍‍	9	–	12	.429	21	–	22	.488
Baylor ‍‍‍	9	–	12	.429	25	–	22	.532
Rice ‍‍‍	8	–	13	.381	34	–	23	.596
TCU ‍‍‍	4	–	15	.211	16	–	25	.390
† – Conference champion ‡ – Tournament champion y – Invited to the NCAA tournament As of June 30, 1982; Rankings from Collegiate Baseball

The 1982 Southwest Conference baseball tournament was the league's annual postseason tournament used to determine the Southwest Conference's (SWC) automatic bid to the 1982 NCAA Division I baseball tournament. The tournament was held from May 14 through 16 at Olsen Field on the campus of Texas A&M University in College Station, Texas.

The number 1 seed Texas Longhorns went 3–0 to win the team's fourth SWC tournament under head coach Cliff Gustafson.

== Format and seeding ==
The tournament featured the top four finishers of the SWC's eight teams in a double-elimination tournament.

Place	Team	Conference				Overall			Seed
Place	Team	W	L	%	GB	W	L	%	Seed
1	Texas	12	4	.750	-	59	6	.908	1
2	Houston	13	6	.684	0.5	42	14	.750	2
3	Arkansas	13	8	.619	1.5	40	15	.727	3
4	Texas A&M	10	10	.500	4	33	19	.635	4
5	Texas Tech	9	12	.429	5.5	21	22	.488	-
6	Baylor	9	12	.429	5.5	25	22	.532	-
7	Rice	8	13	.381	6.5	34	23	.596	-
8	TCU	4	15	.211	9.5	16	25	.390	-

== Tournament ==
Upper round 1
1	Texas	12
4	Texas A&M	7
2	Houston	6
3	Arkansas	9
Lower round 1
4	Texas A&M	6
2	Houston	13

Upper final
1	Texas	8
3	Arkansas	0
Lower final
3	Arkansas	8
2	Houston	9

Final
1	Texas	10	–
2	Houston	5	–
