= 1982 Southeastern Conference baseball tournament =

- Teams: 4
- Format: Four-team double elimination tournament
- Finals site: Perry Field; Gainesville, Florida
- Champions: Florida (2nd title)
- Winning coach: Jack Rhine (1st title)
- MVP: Rich Bombard (Florida)

1982 Southeastern Conference baseball standings
	Conf.				Overall
Team	W		L	PCT	W		L	PCT
Eastern Division
Florida ^{x}‍‍‡‍^{y}	14	–	8	.636	34	–	24	.586
Tennessee ‍‍‍	13	–	9	.591	29	–	17	.630
Georgia ‍‍‍	12	–	10	.545	28	–	29	.491
Vanderbilt ‍‍‍	11	–	12	.478	28	–	17	.622
Kentucky ‍‍‍	6	–	17	.261	23	–	32	.418
Western Division
Ole Miss ^{x}‍‍‍	15	–	6	.714	33	–	19	.635
Alabama ‍‍‍	12	–	10	.545	32	–	21	.604
Mississippi State ‍‍‍	11	–	13	.458	28	–	23	.549
LSU ‍‍‍	9	–	13	.409	26	–	25	.510
Auburn ‍‍‍	8	–	13	.381	27	–	20	.574
x – Division champion ‡ – Tournament champion y – Invited to the NCAA tournament As of June 30, 1982; Rankings from Collegiate Baseball

The 1982 Southeastern Conference baseball tournament was held at Perry Field in Gainesville, Florida, from May 14 through 16. Florida won their second consecutive tournament and earned the Southeastern Conference's automatic bid to the 1982 NCAA tournament.

== Regular season results ==
Team	W	L	Pct	GB	Seed
Eastern Division
Florida	14	8	.636	—	2
Tennessee	13	9	.591	1	3
Georgia	12	10	.545	2	—
Vanderbilt	11	12	.478	3.5	—
Kentucky	6	17	.261	8.5	—

Team	W	L	Pct	GB	Seed
Western Division
Ole Miss	15	6	.714	—	1
Alabama	12	10	.545	3.5	4
Mississippi State	11	13	.458	5.5	—
LSU	9	13	.409	6.5	—
Auburn	8	13	.381	7	—

== Tournament ==
First round
1	Ole Miss	10
3	Tennessee	4
2	Florida	7
4	Alabama	3
Lower round 1
3	Tennessee	7
4	Alabama	6

Semi-finals
1	Ole Miss	7
2	Florida	8
Lower final
3	Tennessee	12
1	Ole Miss	11

Finals
2	Florida	7	9
3	Tennessee	10	3

== All-Tournament Team ==
Position	Player	School
1B	Javier Ortiz	Florida
2B	Kirk Hanson	Ole Miss
3B	Dave Magadan	Alabama
SS	David Clements	Ole Miss
C	Mike Stanley	Florida
OF	Guy Summerlin	Ole Miss
OF	Greg Geren	Tennessee
OF	Curt Cornwell	Tennessee
OF	Steve Ford	Florida
DH	Rusty Ensor	Tennessee
UT	Dean Eichelberger	Tennessee
P	Brian Farmer	Ole Miss
P	Teddy Carson	Tennessee
P	Rich Bombard	Florida
MVP	Rich Bombard	Florida

== See also ==
- College World Series
- NCAA Division I Baseball Championship
- Southeastern Conference baseball tournament
