= 1982 Big Ten baseball tournament =

1982 Big Ten Conference baseball tournament
- Teams: 4
- Format: Double-elimination
- Finals site: Illinois Field (1884); Champaign, IL
- Champions: Minnesota (1st title)
- Winning coach: John Anderson (1st title)
- MVP: Terry Steinbach/Jeff King (Minnesota/Ohio State)

1982 Big Ten Conference baseball standings
| | Conf. | | | | | | Overall |
| Team | W | | L | | T | PCT | W | | L | | T | PCT |
|---|---|---|---|---|---|---|---|---|---|---|---|---|
East
| Ohio State ^{x}‍‍‍ | 13 | – | 3 | – | 0 | .813 | 45 | – | 14 | – | 0 | .763 |
| Michigan ‍‍‍ | 13 | – | 3 | – | 0 | .813 | 44 | – | 10 | – | 0 | .815 |
| Purdue ‍‍‍ | 6 | – | 10 | – | 0 | .375 | 36 | – | 23 | – | 0 | .610 |
| Michigan State ‍‍‍ | 6 | – | 10 | – | 0 | .375 | 25 | – | 29 | – | 0 | .463 |
| Indiana ‍‍‍ | 2 | – | 14 | – | 0 | .125 | 25 | – | 28 | – | 0 | .472 |
West
| Illinois ^{x}‍‍‍ | 14 | – | 2 | – | 0 | .875 | 49 | – | 23 | – | 0 | .681 |
| No. 26 Minnesota ‍‍‡‍^{y} | 8 | – | 8 | – | 0 | .500 | 33 | – | 22 | – | 1 | .598 |
| Northwestern ‍‍‍ | 7 | – | 9 | – | 0 | .438 | 25 | – | 27 | – | 1 | .481 |
| Wisconsin ‍‍‍ | 6 | – | 10 | – | 0 | .375 | 23 | – | 28 | – | 0 | .451 |
| Iowa ‍‍‍ | 5 | – | 11 | – | 0 | .313 | 31 | – | 23 | – | 0 | .574 |
x – Division champion ‡ – Tournament champion y – Invited to the NCAA tournament As of June 30, 1982; Rankings from Collegiate Baseball

The 1982 Big Ten Conference baseball tournament was held at Old Illinois Field on the campus of the University of Illinois at Urbana–Champaign in Champaign, Illinois, from May 21 through 23. The top two teams from the regular season in each division participated in the double-elimination tournament, the second annual tournament sponsored by the Big Ten Conference to determine the league champion. Minnesota won their first tournament championship and earned the Big Ten Conference's automatic bid to the 1982 NCAA Division I baseball tournament

== Format and seeding ==
The 1982 tournament was a 4-team double-elimination tournament, with seeds determined by conference regular season winning percentage within each division. Ohio State claimed the top seed from the East by winning the season series over Michigan. The top seed from each division played the second seed from the opposite division in the first round.

| Team | W | L | PCT | GB | Seed |
|---|---|---|---|---|---|
East Division
| Ohio State | 13 | 3 | .813 | – | 1E |
| Michigan | 13 | 3 | .813 | – | 2E |
| Purdue | 6 | 10 | .375 | 7 | – |
| Michigan State | 6 | 10 | .375 | 7 | – |
| Indiana | 2 | 14 | .083 | 11 | – |
West Division
| Illinois | 14 | 2 | .875 | – | 1W |
| Minnesota | 8 | 8 | .500 | 6 | 2W |
| Northwestern | 7 | 9 | .438 | 7 | – |
| Wisconsin | 6 | 10 | .375 | 8 | – |
| Iowa | 5 | 11 | .313 | 9 | – |

== Tournament ==
Upper round 1
1E | Ohio State | 5
2W | Minnesota | 3
1W | Illinois | 2
2E | Michigan | 4
Lower round 1
2W | Minnesota | 8
1W | Illinois | 3

Upper final
1E | Ohio State | 7
2E | Michigan | 2
Lower final
2E | Michigan | 4
2W | Minnesota | 5

Final
1E | Ohio State | 7 | 5
2W | Minnesota | 8 | 7

== All-Tournament Team ==
The following players were named to the All-Tournament Team.

| Pos | Name | School |
|---|---|---|
| P | Jeff Innis | Illinois |
| P | Bill Cunningham | Ohio State |
| C | Jeff King | Ohio State |
| 1B | Tim Richardson | Illinois |
| 2B | Gary Jost | Minnesota |
| SS | Bill Piwnica | Minnesota |
| OF | Jim Paciorek | Michigan |
| OF | Terry Steinbach | Minnesota |
| OF | John Orkis | Ohio State |
| OF | Kirk Dixon | Ohio State |
| DH | Tim Steinbach | Minnesota |

=== Most Outstanding Player ===
Terry Steinbach and Jeff King were named co-Most Outstanding Players. Steinbach was an outfielder for Minnesota while King was a catcher for Ohio State.
