= 1982 Mid-American Conference baseball tournament =

American collegiate baseball tournament

- Teams: 4
- Format: Double-elimination
- Finals site: Franklin County Stadium; Columbus, OH
- Champions: Eastern Michigan (2nd title)
- Winning coach: Ron Oestrike (2nd title)

1982 Mid-American Conference baseball standings
	Conf.						Overall
Team	W		L		T	PCT	W		L		T	PCT
Eastern Division
Ohio ^{x}‍‍‍	10	–	5	–	0	.667	26	–	23	–	1	.530
Toledo ‍‍‍	10	–	6	–	0	.625	26	–	28	–	1	.482
Kent State ‍‍‍	8	–	8	–	0	.500	35	–	23	–	0	.603
Miami ‍‍‍	6	–	10	–	0	.375	16	–	25	–	0	.390
Bowling Green ‍‍‍	5	–	10	–	0	.333	29	–	23	–	1	.557
Western Division
Western Michigan ^{x}‍‍‍	12	–	4	–	0	.750	34	–	17	–	0	.667
Eastern Michigan ‍‍‡‍^{y}	9	–	4	–	0	.692	39	–	23	–	2	.625
Central Michigan ‍‍‍	8	–	4	–	0	.667	24	–	17	–	0	.585
Northern Illinois ‍‍‍	4	–	9	–	0	.308	19	–	24	–	1	.443
Ball State ‍‍‍	0	–	12	–	0	.000	10	–	21	–	0	.323
x – Division champion ‡ – Tournament champion y – Invited to the NCAA tournament As of June 30, 1982; Rankings from Collegiate Baseball

The 1982 Mid-American Conference baseball tournament took place in May 1982. The top two regular season finishers from each division met in the double-elimination tournament held at Franklin County Stadium in Columbus, Ohio. This was the second Mid-American Conference postseason tournament to determine a champion. Eastern Michigan, the second seed from the West, won their second tournament championship to earn the conference's automatic bid to the 1982 NCAA Division I baseball tournament.

== Seeding and format ==
The top two finishers from each division, based on conference winning percentage only, participated in the tournament. The top seed from each division played the second seed from the other division in the double-elimination tournament.

Team	W	L	PCT	GB	Seed
Eastern Division
Ohio	10	5	.667	–	1E
Toledo	10	6	.625	.5	2E
Kent State	8	8	.500	2.5	–
Miami	6	10	.375	4.5	–
Bowling Green	5	10	.333	5	–
Western Division
Western Michigan	12	4	.750	–	1W
Eastern Michigan	9	4	.692	1.5	2W
Central Michigan	8	4	.667	2	–
Northern Illinois	4	9	.308	6.5	–
Ball State	0	12	.000	10	–

== Results ==
Upper round 1
1W	Western Michigan	4
2E	Toledo	3
1E	Ohio	6
2W	Eastern Michigan	8
Lower round 1
2E	Toledo	5
1E	Ohio	1

Upper final
1W	Western Michigan	2
2W	Eastern Michigan	4
Lower final
1W	Western Michigan	4
2E	Toledo	6

Final
2W	Eastern Michigan	18	—
2E	Toledo	13	—
