= 1982 Wichita State Shockers baseball team =

American college baseball season

1982 Wichita State Shockers baseball

MVC champion MVC Tournament champion South Regional champion

College World Series, 2nd
- Conference: Missouri Valley Conference
- CB: No. 2
- Record: 73–14 (15–1 MVC)
- Head coach: Gene Stephenson (5th season)
- Home stadium: Shocker Field

1982 Missouri Valley Conference baseball standings
	Conf.				Overall
Team	W		L	PCT	W		L	PCT
Eastern Division
Indiana State ^{x}‍‍‍	12	–	4	.750	40	–	20	.667
Southern Illinois ‍‍‍	8	–	8	.500	32	–	20	.615
Bradley ‍‍‍	6	–	6	.500	23	–	29	.442
Illinois State ‍‍‍	4	–	8	.333	24	–	19	.558
Western Division
No. 2 Wichita State ^{x}‍‍‡‍^{y}	15	–	1	.938	73	–	14	.839
Creighton ‍‍‍	1	–	7	.125	32	–	23	.582
New Mexico State ‍‍‍	0	–	8	.000	23	–	27	.460
x – Division champion ‡ – Tournament champion y – Invited to the NCAA tournament As of June 30, 1982; Rankings from Collegiate Baseball

The 1982 Wichita State Shockers baseball team represented Wichita State University in the 1982 NCAA Division I baseball season. The Shockers played their home games at Shocker Field in Wichita, Kansas. The team was coached by Gene Stephenson in his fifth season as head coach at Wichita State.

The Shockers reached the College World Series, finishing as the runner up to Miami (FL).

== Personnel ==
=== Roster ===
1991 Wichita State Shockers roster
1 - Dave Lucas; 2 - Pat Blasi; 4 - Kevin Penner; 8 - Tim Gaskell; 11 - Erik Sonberg; 13 - Tony Lask; 14 - Jim Daniel; 16 - Joe Paatolo; 18 - Jeff Jennings; 20 - Russ Morman	21 - Dan Greishaber; 23 - Jeff Brogan; 26 - Walt Hagerty; 28 - Frank Schulte; 29 - Jeff Mann; 30 - Tom Smith; 31 - Anthony Carter; 33 - Dennis Overacker; 34 - Ken Greenwood	Pitchers: 12 - Stan Brown; 15 - Bryan Oelkers; 19 - Greg LaFever; 25 - Don Heinkel; 35 - Troy Howerton; Infielders: 3 - Phil Stephenson; 5 - Jim Thomas; 9 - Jim Spring	Catchers: 22 - Charlie O'Brien; Outfielders: 6 - Mark Grogan; 32 - Loren Hibbs

=== Coaches ===
1991 Wichita State Shockers baseball coaching staff
- 10 - Gene Stephenson - Head coach
- 24 - Brent Kemnitz - Pitching coach
- 7 - Tim Tolin - Graduate Assistant
- 17 - Rick Younger - Graduate Assistant

== Schedule ==
Legend
Wichita State win
Wichita State loss

1982 Wichita State Shockers baseball game log
Regular season

February (4–4)
Date	Opponent	Site/stadium	Score	Overall record	MVC record
Feb 18	at Arizona State*	Packard Stadium • Tempe, AZ	L 1–7	0–1	
Feb 18	at Grand Canyon*	Brazell Stadium • Phoenix, AZ	W 15–2	1–1	
Feb 19	at Arizona State*	Packard Stadium • Tempe, AZ	L 2–3	1–2	
Feb 20	at Arizona State*	Packard Stadium • Tempe, AZ	L 0–18	1–3	
Feb 27	at St. Edward's (TX)*	Austin, TX	W 3–2	2–3	
Feb 27	at St. Edward's (TX)*	Austin, TX	W 7–6	3–3	
Feb 28	at Southwestern (TX)*	Georgetown, TX	L 0–2	3–4	
Feb 28	at Southwestern (TX)*	Georgetown, TX	W 5–4	4–4	

March (26–4)
Date	Opponent	Site/stadium	Score	Overall record	MVC record
Mar 1	at Texas*	Disch–Falk Field • Austin, TX	L 0–2	4–5	
Mar 2	at Texas*	Disch–Falk Field • Austin, TX	L 0–12	4–6	
Mar 6	Fort Hays State*	Shocker Field • Wichita, KS	W 15–0	5–6	
Mar 6	Fort Hays State*	Shocker Field • Wichita, KS	W 12–2	6–6	
Mar 7	Fort Hays State*	Shocker Field • Wichita, KS	W 16–0	7–6	
Mar 7	Fort Hays State*	Shocker Field • Wichita, KS	W 11–1	8–6	
Mar 8	Wayne State (NE)*	Shocker Field • Wichita, KS	W 15–6	9–6	
Mar 8	Wayne State (NE)*	Shocker Field • Wichita, KS	W 6–4	10–6	
Mar 12	at New Mexico State	Presley Askew Field • Las Cruces, NM	W 9–2	11–6	1–0
Mar 13	vs UTEP*	Presley Askew Field • Las Cruces, NM	L 0–2	11–7	
Mar 13	vs UTEP*	Presley Askew Field • Las Cruces, NM	W 7–4	12–7	
Mar 14	vs Wyoming*	Presley Askew Field • Las Cruces, NM	W 16–1	13–7	
Mar 15	at New Mexico State	Presley Askew Field • Las Cruces, NM	W 5–3	14–7	2–0
Mar 16	vs Colorado State*	Presley Askew Field • Las Cruces, NM	W 5–	15–7	
Mar 16	vs Colorado State*	Presley Askew Field • Las Cruces, NM	W 11–3	16–7	
Mar 17	vs Denver*	Presley Askew Field • Las Cruces, NM	W 24–0	17–7	
Mar 18	vs Colorado State*	Presley Askew Field • Las Cruces, NM	W 11–3	18–7	
Mar 19	at New Mexico State	Presley Askew Field • Las Cruces, NM	W 12–3	19–7	3–0
Mar 20	vs Colorado State*	Presley Askew Field • Las Cruces, NM	W 5–2	20–7	
Mar 20	at New Mexico State	Presley Askew Field • Las Cruces, NM	W 12–3	21–7	4–0
Mar 21	vs Denver*	Presley Askew Field • Las Cruces, NM	W 16–0	22–7	
Mar 24	Baker*	Shocker Field • Wichita, KS	W 12–0	23–7	
Mar 24	Baker*	Shocker Field • Wichita, KS	W 17–0	24–7	
Mar 26	Minnesota–Morris*	Shocker Field • Wichita, KS	W 15–2	25–7	
Mar 26	Minnesota–Morris*	Shocker Field • Wichita, KS	W 16–2	26–7	
Mar 27	Minnesota–Morris*	Shocker Field • Wichita, KS	W 12–11	27–7	
Mar 28	William Jewell*	Shocker Field • Wichita, KS	L 3–5	27–8	
Mar 28	William Jewell*	Shocker Field • Wichita, KS	W 20–1	28–8	
Mar 30	Bemidji State*	Shocker Field • Wichita, KS	W 20–1	29–8	
Mar 30	Bemidji State*	Shocker Field • Wichita, KS	W 27–7	30–8	

April (26–2)
Date	Opponent	Site/stadium	Score	Overall record	MVC record
Apr 1	Northeastern State (OK)*	Shocker Field • Wichita, KS	W 17–7	31–8	
Apr 1	Northwestern State (OK)*	Shocker Field • Wichita, KS	W 20–1	32–8	
Apr 3	Winona State*	Shocker Field • Wichita, KS	W 13–2	33–8	
Apr 3	Winona State*	Shocker Field • Wichita, KS	W 25–2	34–8	
Apr 4	Northwest Missouri State*	Shocker Field • Wichita, KS	L 4–7	34–9	
Apr 4	Northwest Missouri State*	Shocker Field • Wichita, KS	W 8–6	35–9	
Apr 5	Marymount*	Shocker Field • Wichita, KS	W 10–0	36–9	
Apr 5	Marymount*	Shocker Field • Wichita, KS	W 11–0	37–9	
Apr 8	New Mexico State*	Shocker Field • Wichita, KS	W 15–0	38–9	5–0
Apr 9	New Mexico State*	Shocker Field • Wichita, KS	W 12–0	39–9	6–0
Apr 9	New Mexico State*	Shocker Field • Wichita, KS	W 17–2	40–9	7–0
Apr 10	New Mexico State*	Shocker Field • Wichita, KS	W 15–1	41–9	8–0
Apr 12	Emporia State*	Shocker Field • Wichita, KS	W 8–3	42–9	
Apr 12	Emporia State*	Shocker Field • Wichita, KS	W 12–6	43–9	
Apr 13	Phillips*	Shocker Field • Wichita, KS	W 7–1	44–9	
Apr 13	Phillips*	Shocker Field • Wichita, KS	W 4–3	45–9	
Apr 16	Creighton	Shocker Field • Wichita, KS	W 7–5	46–9	9–0
Apr 16	Creighton	Shocker Field • Wichita, KS	W 9–0	47–9	10–0
Apr 17	Creighton	Shocker Field • Wichita, KS	W 10–1	48–9	11–0
Apr 17	Creighton	Shocker Field • Wichita, KS	W 9–1	49–9	12–0
Apr 21	Oklahoma City*	Shocker Field • Wichita, KS	W 10–0	50–9	
Apr 21	Oklahoma City*	Shocker Field • Wichita, KS	W 12–1	51–9	
Apr 24	at Creighton	Omaha, NE	W 7–4	52–9	13–0
Apr 24	at Creighton	Omaha, NE	W 6–5	53–9	14–0
Apr 25	at Creighton	Omaha, NE	W 7–0	54–9	15–0
Apr 25	at Creighton	Omaha, NE	L 3–5	54–10	15–1
Apr 27	Oklahoma State*	Shocker Field • Wichita, KS	W 8–3	55–10	
Apr 29	Newman (KS)*	Shocker Field • Wichita, KS	W 13–3	56–10	

May (6–1)
Date	Opponent	Site/stadium	Score	Overall record	MVC record
May 2	Texas Wesleyan*	Shocker Field • Wichita, KS	W 12–0	57–10	
May 2	Texas Wesleyan*	Shocker Field • Wichita, KS	W 4–2	58–10	
May 4	at Oral Roberts*	J. L. Johnson Stadium • Tulsa, OK	W 5–1	59–10	
May 7	Emporia State*	Shocker Field • Wichita, KS	W 9–8	60–10	
May 8	Arizona State*	Lawrence–Dumont Stadium • Wichita, KS	L 8–9	60–11	
May 9	Arizona State*	Shocker Field • Wichita, KS	W 15–4	61–11	
May 9	Arizona State*	Shocker Field • Wichita, KS	W 6–2	62–11	

Post-season

MVC Tournament (3–0)
Date	Opponent	Site/stadium	Score	Overall record	MVCT Record
May 14	Southern Illinois	Sycamore Stadium • Terre Haute, IN	W 9–6	63–11	1–0
May 15	Indiana State	Sycamore Stadium • Terre Haute, IN	W 13–1	64–11	2–0
May 16	Southern Illinois	Sycamore Stadium • Terre Haute, IN	W 12–8	65–11	3–0

May (2–1)
Date	Opponent	Site/stadium	Score	Overall record
May 21	Cal State Fullerton	Shocker Field • Wichita, KS	W 10–6	66–11
May 22	Cal State Fullerton	Lawrence–Dumont Stadium • Wichita, KS	W 3–2	67–11
May 23	Cal State Fullerton	Lawrence–Dumont Stadium • Wichita, KS	L 6–7	67–12

NCAA South Regional (3–0)
Date	Opponent	Site/stadium	Score	Overall record	Regional record
May 28	Jackson State	Privateer Park • New Orleans, LA	W 3–0	68–12	1–0
May 29	New Orleans	Privateer Park • New Orleans, LA	W 7–0	69–12	2–0
May 31	New Orleans	Privateer Park • New Orleans, LA	W 8–1	70–12	3–0

College World Series (3–2)
Date	Opponent	Site/stadium	Score	Overall record	CWS record
June 4	Cal State Fullerton	Johnny Rosenblatt Stadium • Omaha, NE	W 7–0	71–12	1–0
June 7	Miami (FL)	Johnny Rosenblatt Stadium • Omaha, NE	L 3–4	71–13	1–1
June 9	Oklahoma State	Johnny Rosenblatt Stadium • Omaha, NE	W 13–2	72–13	2–1
June 11	Texas	Johnny Rosenblatt Stadium • Omaha, NE	W 8–4	73–13	3–1
June 12	Miami (FL)	Johnny Rosenblatt Stadium • Omaha, NE	L 3–9	73–14	3–2
