= 1982 Cal State Fullerton Titans baseball team =

American college baseball season

1982 Cal State Fullerton Titans baseball

SCBA champions NCAA West II Regional champions

College World Series, 0–2
- Conference: Southern California Baseball Association
- Record: 51–23 (23–5 SCBA)
- Head coach: Augie Garrido (10th year)
- Home stadium: Titan Field

1982 Southern California Baseball Association standings
	Conf.				Overall
Team	W		L	PCT	W		L	PCT
No. 8 Cal State Fullerton ‍†‍‍^{y}	23	–	5	.821	51	–	23	.689
No. 10 Pepperdine ‍‍‍^{y}	21	–	7	.750	44	–	19	.698
UC Santa Barbara ‍‍‍	16	–	12	.571	37	–	24	.607
San Diego ‍‍‍	13	–	15	.464	29	–	24	.547
Loyola Marymount ‍‍‍	12	–	16	.429	29	–	34	.460
UC Irvine ‍‍‍	11	–	17	.393	28	–	29	.491
Cal State Los Angeles ‍‍‍	8	–	20	.286	17	–	36	.321
Long Beach State ‍‍‍	8	–	20	.286	27	–	33	.450
† – Conference champion y – Invited to the NCAA tournament As of June 30, 1982; Rankings from Collegiate Baseball

The 1982 Cal State Fullerton Titans baseball team represented California State University, Fullerton in the 1982 NCAA Division I baseball season. The Titans played their home games at Titan Field, and played as part of the Southern California Baseball Association. The team was coached by Augie Garrido in his tenth season as head coach at Cal State Fullerton.

The Titans reached the College World Series, their third appearance in Omaha, where they finished tied for seventh place after losing games to eventual runner-up Wichita State and third place Maine.

== Personnel ==
=== Roster ===
1982 Cal State Fullerton Titans roster
Pitchers: 1 - Brian Allen - Junior; 3 - Damon Allen - Freshman; 6 - Dave Wilder - Senior; 9 - Mike DiGiacomo - Senior; 13 - Eric Barry - Junior; 18 - Jeff Robinson - Junior; 20 - Scott Wright - Sophomore; 21 - Mark Pirruccello - Senior; 22 - Steve Rousey - Freshman; 23 - Dan Sottosantil - Freshman; 24 - Bill Hobbs - Freshman; 27 - Todd Simmons - Freshman; 31 - Tom Saenz - Sophomore; 35 - Tim Thompson - Junior	Catchers: 11 - Amin David - Freshman; 15 - Paul Bradley - Junior; 34 - Rick Campo - Sophomore; Outfielders: 5 - Mike Vanderburg - Junior; 12 - John Fishel - Freshman; 14 - Bob Caffrey - Freshman; 26 - Stefan Lipson - Sophomore; 30 - Bill Moore - Junior	Infielders: 2 - Shane Turner - Freshman; 4 - Vic Espinosa - Junior; 8 - Mark Glaab - Sophomore; 10 - Brian David - Senior; 19 - Frank Mendicina - Freshman; 25 - John Alvarez - Sophomore; 28 - Mike Rubel - Junior; 32 - Bob Bathe - Junior; 33 - Bob Bright - Sophomore; 36 - Jon Hockenberry - Senior

=== Coaches ===
1982 Cal State Fullerton Titans baseball coaching staff
- 16 - Augie Garrido - Head coach - 10th year
- 7 - Rick Oliver - Assistant coach - 1st year
- 17 - Bill Kernen - Assistant coach - 5th year
- 37 - Jon Hockenberry Sr. - Volunteer assistant coach - 1st year

== Schedule and results ==
Legend
Cal State Fullerton win
Cal State Fullerton loss

1982 Cal State Fullerton Titans baseball game log
Regular season

February
Date	Opponent	Site/stadium	Score	Overall record	SCBA Record
Feb 5	at No. 4 Stanford*	Sunken Diamond • Stanford, California	L 0–2	0–1	
Feb 6	at No. 4 Stanford*	Sunken Diamond • Stanford, California	W 10–3	1–1	
Feb 6	at No. 4 Stanford*	Sunken Diamond • Stanford, California	L 4–5	1–2	
Feb 11	at No. 11 Arizona*	Wildcat Field • Tucson, AZ	W 12–4	2–2	
Feb 13	at No. 11 Arizona*	Wildcat Field • Tucson, AZ	W 5–1	3–2	
Feb 13	at No. 11 Arizona*	Wildcat Field • Tucson, AZ	L 2–7	3–3	
Feb 16	at UCLA*	Jackie Robinson Stadium • Los Angeles, CA	L 6–16	3–4	
Feb 17	Cal State Dominguez Hills*	Titan Field • Fullerton, CA	W 5–3	4–4	
Feb 18	No. 11 Arizona*	Titan Field • Fullerton, CA	W 3–2	5–4	
Feb 19	No. 11 Arizona*	Titan Field • Fullerton, CA	L 1–2	5–5	
Feb 20	No. 11 Arizona*	Titan Field • Fullerton, CA	W 17–3	6–5	
Feb 23	at No. 12 Southern California*	Dedeaux Field • Los Angeles, CA	W 6–3	7–5	
Feb 24	US International*	Titan Field • Fullerton, CA	W 16–3	8–5	
Feb 26	Fresno State*	Titan Field • Fullerton, CA	W 6–4	9–5	
Feb 27	Fresno State*	Titan Field • Fullerton, CA	L 4–8	9–6	
Feb 27	Fresno State*	Titan Field • Fullerton, CA	L 4–9	9–7	

March
Date	Opponent	Site/stadium	Score	Overall record	SCBA Record
Mar 3	US International*	Titan Field • Fullerton, CA	W 12–0	10–7	
Mar 5	St. Mary's*	Titan Field • Fullerton, CA	W 6–1	11–7	
Mar 6	St. Mary's*	Titan Field • Fullerton, CA	L 5–7	11–8	
Mar 6	St. Mary's*	Titan Field • Fullerton, CA	W 8–1	12–8	
Mar 7	Gonzaga*	Titan Field • Fullerton, CA	W 9–5	13–8	
Mar 9	No. 8 UCLA*	Titan Field • Fullerton, CA	W 9–7	14–8	
Mar 10	Cal Poly Pomona*	Titan Field • Fullerton, CA	L 10–12	14–9	
Mar 13	Pacific*	Titan Field • Fullerton, CA	W 8–7	15–9	
Mar 13	Pacific*	Titan Field • Fullerton, CA	W 8–0	16–9	
Mar 15	Maine*	Titan Field • Fullerton, CA	W 6–2	17–9	
Mar 20	at Chapman*	Orange, CA	W 3–2	18–9	
Mar 20	at Chapman*	Orange, CA	L 1–3	18–10	
Mar 23	at La Verne*	La Verne, CA	W 5–1	19–10	
Mar 25	at No. 6 Hawaii*	UH Stadium • Honolulu, HI	L 9–10	19–11	
Mar 26	at No. 6 Hawaii*	UH Stadium • Honolulu, HI	L 5–8	19–12	
Mar 26	at No. 6 Hawaii*	UH Stadium • Honolulu, HI	W 10–7	20–12	
Mar 27	at No. 6 Hawaii*	UH Stadium • Honolulu, HI	L 1–2	20–13	
Mar 30	at San Diego	John Cunningham Stadium • San Diego, CA	W 5–3	21–13	1–0
Mar 31	at Cal Poly Pomona*	Pomona, CA	W 9–0	22–13	

April
Date	Opponent	Site/stadium	Score	Overall record	SCBA Record
Apr 2	at Loyola Marymount	Los Angeles, CA	W 7–3	23–13	2–0
Apr 3	at Loyola Marymount	Los Angeles, CA	L 5–6	23–14	2–1
Apr 3	at Loyola Marymount	Los Angeles, CA	L 4–6	23–15	2–2
Apr 6	at Pepperdine	Eddy D. Field Stadium • Malibu, CA	L 3–4	23–16	2–3
Apr 7	Sonoma State*	Titan Field • Fullerton, CA	W 15–4	24–16	
Apr 9	at UC Santa Barbara	Campus Stadium • Santa Barbara, CA	W 7–1	25–16	3–3
Apr 10	UC Santa Barbara	Titan Field • Fullerton, CA	W 8–2	26–16	4–3
Apr 10	UC Santa Barbara	Titan Field • Fullerton, CA	W 6–1	27–16	5–3
Apr 13	Long Beach State	Titan Field • Fullerton, CA	W 13–0	28–16	6–3
Apr 14	at Cal State Dominguez Hills*	W 5–4	29–16		
Apr 16	at UC Irvine	Irvine, CA	W 6–5	30–16	7–3
Apr 17	UC Irvine	Titan Field • Fullerton, CA	W 9–0	31–16	8–3
Apr 17	UC Irvine	Titan Field • Fullerton, CA	W 5–1	32–16	9–3
Apr 20	Loyola Marymount	Titan Field • Fullerton, CA	W 6–5	33–16	10–3
Apr 21	at Azusa Pacific*	Azusa, CA	W 7–4	34–16	
Apr 23	Cal State Los Angeles	Titan Field • Fullerton, CA	L 6–9	34–17	10–4
Apr 24	at Cal State Los Angeles	Los Angeles, CA	W 16–6	35–17	11–4
Apr 24	at Cal State Los Angeles	Los Angeles, CA	W 11–5	36–17	12–4
Apr 27	UC Santa Barbara	Titan Field • Fullerton, CA	W 7–2	37–17	13–4
Apr 30	at San Diego	John Cunningham Stadium • San Diego, CA	W 7–2	38–17	14–4

May
Date	Opponent	Site/stadium	Score	Overall record	SCBA Record
May 1	San Diego	Titan Field • Fullerton, CA	W 11–3	39–17	15–4
May 1	San Diego	Titan Field • Fullerton, CA	W 17–2	40–17	16–4
May 5	at UC Irvine	Irvine, CA	W 11–5	41–17	17–4
May 7	at Pepperdine	Eddy D. Field Stadium • Malibu, CA	W 9–5	42–17	18–4
May 8	Pepperdine	Titan Field • Fullerton, CA	W 6–1	43–17	19–4
May 8	Pepperdine	Titan Field • Fullerton, CA	W 3–1	44–17	20–4
May 11	Cal State Los Angeles	Titan Field • Fullerton, CA	W 8–2	45–17	21–4
May 12	US International*	Titan Field • Fullerton, CA	L 5–7	45–18	
May 14	Long Beach State	Titan Field • Fullerton, CA	W 7–4	46–18	22–4
May 15	at Long Beach State	Blair Field • Long Beach, CA	L 3–6	46–19	22–5
May 15	at Long Beach State	Blair • Long Beach, CA	W 3–1	47–19	23–5
May 21	at No. 3 Wichita State*	Shocker Field • Wichita, KS	L 6–10	47–20	
May 22	at No. 3 Wichita State*	Shocker Field • Wichita, KS	L 2–3	47–21	
May 23	at No. 3 Wichita State*	Shocker Field • Wichita, KS	W 7–6	48–21	

Postseason

NCAA West II Regional
Date	Opponent	Site/stadium	Score	Overall record	Reg Record
May 28	No. 15 Houston	Packard Stadium • Tempe, AZ	W 7–3	49–21	1–0
May 29	No. 1 Arizona State	Packard Stadium • Tempe, AZ	W 2–1	50–21	2–0
May 30	No. 1 Arizona State	Packard Stadium • Tempe, AZ	W 4–5	51–21	3–0

College World Series
Date	Opponent	Site/stadium	Score	Overall record	CWS record
June 6	No. 3 Wichita State	Johnny Rosenblatt Stadium • Omaha, NE	L 0–7	51–22	0–1
June 7	Maine	Johnny Rosenblatt Stadium • Omaha, NE	L 0–6	51–23	0–2
