= 1982 Maine Black Bears baseball team =

1982 Maine Black Bears baseball

ECAC New England baseball tournament champion NCAA Northeast Regional champion

College World Series, 2–2
- Conference: Eastern College Athletic Conference
- Record: 35–12 (10–3 Eastern College Athletic Conference)
- Head coach: John Winkin (8th season)

1982 Eastern College Athletic Conference baseball standings
	Conf.						Overall
Team	W		L		T	PCT	W		L		T	PCT
New England
No. 3 Maine ‍‍‍^{y}	10	–	3	–	0	.769	35	–	13	–	0	.729
Fairfield ‍‍‍	7	–	5	–	0	.583	18	–	15	–	0	.545
Vermont ‍‍‍	7	–	6	–	0	.538	18	–	10	–	0	.643
Providence ‍‍‍	8	–	7	–	0	.533	22	–	23	–	1	.489
Boston College ‍‍‍	6	–	6	–	0	.500	11	–	11	–	0	.500
New Hampshire ‍‍‍	6	–	8	–	0	.429	17	–	14	–	0	.548
Holy Cross ‍‍‍	7	–	10	–	1	.417	13	–	5	–	0	.722
Northeastern ‍‍‍	4	–	7	–	1	.375	8	–	17	–	1	.327
Connecticut ‍‍‍	4	–	7	–	0	.364	9	–	22	–	0	.290
South
Seton Hall ‍‍‍^{y}	16	–	0	–	0	1.000	41	–	13	–	0	.759
Old Dominion ‍‍‍^{y}	12	–	3	–	0	.800	38	–	14	–	0	.731
Georgetown ‍‍‍	7	–	3	–	0	.700	21	–	19	–	0	.525
East Carolina ‍‍‍^{y}	9	–	4	–	0	.692	34	–	15	–	0	.694
James Madison ‍‍‍	15	–	8	–	0	.652	40	–	15	–	0	.727
Canisius ‍‍‍	2	–	4	–	0	.333	14	–	15	–	0	.483
NYIT ‍‍‍		–		–	0	–	21	–	13	–	0	.618
George Mason ‍‍‍		–		–	0	–	19	–	24	–	0	.442
x – Division champion ‡ – Tournament champion y – Invited to the NCAA tournament As of June 30, 1982; Rankings from Collegiate Baseball

The 1982 Maine Black Bears baseball team represented the University of Maine in the 1982 NCAA Division I baseball season. The Black Bears were led by John Winkin in his 8th year as head coach, and played as a members of the Eastern College Athletic Conference.

Maine posted a 35–12 record (one game later awarded by forfeit as California Baptist used an ineligible player) and 10–3 in ECAC, and won the Eastern College Athletic Conference New England Tournament to claim the automatic bid to the 1982 NCAA Division I baseball tournament. They swept the Northeast Regional to advance to the 1982 College World Series, their fourth appearance in Omaha. The Black Bears finished tied for third after recording wins against Cal State Fullerton and Stanford and a pair of losses to eventual champion Miami (FL).

== Personnel ==
=== Roster ===
1982 Maine Black Bears baseball roster
Pitchers: 3 - Kevin Jordan - Sophomore; 6 - John Balerna - Junior; 8 - Bill Swift - Sophomore; l4 - Ernie Webster - Freshman; 15 - Tom Mahan - Senior; 16 - Stu Lacognata - Sophomore; 17 - John Kowalski - Freshman; 18 - Joe Johnson - Junior; 28 - Tony Cimino - Junior	Catchers: 12 - Peter Bushway - Sophomore; 25 - Ed Hackett - Sophomore; 26 - Ed Pickett - Senior; Outfielders: 20 - Brad Colton - Junior; 24 - Tom Vanidestine - Junior; 29 - Rick Lashua - Sophomore	Infielders: 4 - Kevin Bernier - Junior; 7 - Pete Adams - Senior; 9 - Jeff Paul - Sophomore; 10 - Fred Staples - Junior; 11 - Rob Roy - Freshman; 19 - Mark Sutton - Senior; 22 - Dick Whitten - Junior

==== Coaches ====
1982 Maine Black Bears baseball coaching staff
- 5 - John Winkin - Head coach - 8th season
- 31 - Brian Cox - Assistant coach - 3rd season
- - Bob Whalen - Assistant coach - 1st season

== Schedule ==
1982 Maine Black Bears baseball game log
Regular season

March
Date	Opponent	Site/stadium	Score	Overall record	ECAC record
Mar 15	at Cal State Fullerton*	Titan Field • Fullerton, CA	L 2–6	0–1	
Mar 18	at Long Beach State*	Blair Field • Long Beach, CA	L 0–2	0–2	
Mar 18	at Long Beach State*	Blair Field • Long Beach, CA	L 2–9	0–3	
	vs Wisconsin*	Riverside Sports Complex • Riverside, CA	L 5–9	0–4	
Mar 20	at UC Riverside*	Riverside Sports Complex • Riverside, CA	W 2–1	1–4	
	vs Wisconsin*	Riverside Sports Complex • Riverside, CA	W 14–2	2–4	
	vs Oral Roberts*	Riverside Sports Complex • Riverside, CA (Riverside Tournament)	L 2–5	2–5	
Mar 22	at UC Riverside*	Riverside Sports Complex • Riverside, CA (Riverside Tournament)	L 5–9	2–6	
Mar 23	vs Tulane*	Riverside Sports Complex • Riverside, CA (Riverside Tournament)	W 11–6	3–6	
	at California Baptist*	Riverside, CA	L 2–7 (Note: This game was later forfeited by California Baptist for using an ineligible player.)	3–7	
Mar 24	at USC*	Dedeaux Field • Los Angeles, CA	L 3–12	3–8	
Mar 25	vs Stanford*	Riverside Sports Complex • Riverside, CA (Riverside Tournament)	W 7–4	4–8	
Mar 25	vs Washington*	Riverside Sports Complex • Riverside, CA (Riverside Tournament)	W 6–2	5–8	
	vs Wisconsin*	Riverside Sports Complex • Riverside, CA (Riverside Tournament)	W 11–2	6–8	
Mar 27	vs BYU*	Riverside Sports Complex • Riverside, CA (Riverside Tournament)	L 3–12	6–9	

April/May
Date	Opponent	Site/stadium	Score	Overall record	ECAC record
	at Yale*	Yale Field • New Haven, CT	W 11–10	7–9	
Apr 3	at Connecticut	J. O. Christian Field • Storrs, CT	W 5–0	8–9	1–0
	at Holy Cross	Fitton Field • Worcester, MA	W 17–3	9–9	2–0
	at Holy Cross	Fitton Field • Worcester, MA	L 6–9	9–10	2–1
	Vermont	Mahaney Diamond • Orono, ME	W 6–1	10–10	3–1
	Vermont	Mahaney Diamond • Orono, ME	L 3–4	10–11	3–2
Apr 20	at Southern Maine*	Gorham, ME	W 18–5	11–11	
Apr 20	at Southern Maine*	Gorham, ME	W 9–0	12–11	
	New Hampshire	Mahaney Diamond • Orono, ME	W 5–1	13–11	4–2
	New Hampshire	Mahaney Diamond • Orono, ME	W 4–0	14–11	5–2
	Providence	Mahaney Diamond • Orono, ME	W 5–0	15–11	6–2
	Providence	Mahaney Diamond • Orono, ME	W 6–3	16–11	7–2
Apr 26	at Husson*	Portland, ME	W 5–3	17–11	
Apr 26	at Husson*	Portland, ME	W 5–0	18–11	
Apr 29	Colby*	Mahaney Diamond • Orono, ME	W 6–4	19–11	
Apr 29	Colby*	Mahaney Diamond • Orono, ME	W 9–1	20–11	
	Fairfield	Mahaney Diamond • Orono, ME	W 5–2	21–11	8–2
	Fairfield	Mahaney Diamond • Orono, ME	W 6–4	22–11	9–2
May 2	vs UMass*	South Portland, ME	W 8–2	23–11	
May 2	vs UMass*	South Portland, ME	W 18–7	24–11	
	St. Joseph's (ME)*	Mahaney Diamond • Orono, ME	W 13–6	25–11	
	at Northeastern*	Parsons Field • Brookline, MA	L 2–3	25–12	9–3
	at Boston College*	Shea Field • Chestnut Hill, MA	W 9–3	26–12	10–3

Postseason

ECAC New England baseball tournament
Date	Opponent	Site/stadium	Score	Overall record	ECACT record
	Providence	McCoy Stadium • Pawtucket, RI	W 9–0	27–12	1–0
	Vermont	McCoy Stadium • Pawtucket, RI	W 11–1	28–12	2–0
	Vermont	McCoy Stadium • Pawtucket, RI	W 9–6	29–12	3–0

NCAA Northeast Regional
Date	Opponent	Site/stadium	Score	Overall record	NCAAT record
	Seton Hall	Mahaney Diamond • Orono, ME	W 6–4	30–12	1–0
	Delaware	Mahaney Diamond • Orono, ME	W 13–4	31–12	2–0
	Navy	Mahaney Diamond • Orono, ME	W 4–1	32–12	3–0

College World Series
Date	Opponent	Site/stadium	Score	Overall record	CWS record
June 4	Miami (FL)	Johnny Rosenblatt Stadium • Omaha, NE	L 2–7	32–12	0–1
June 6	Cal State Fullerton	Johnny Rosenblatt Stadium • Omaha, NE	W 6–0	33–12	1–1
June 9	Stanford	Johnny Rosenblatt Stadium • Omaha, NE	W 8–5	34–12	2–1
June 11	Miami (FL)	Johnny Rosenblatt Stadium • Omaha, NE	L 4–10	34–13	2–2
