= 1982 Stanford Cardinal baseball team =

American college baseball season

1982 Stanford Cardinal baseball

Pacific-10 Playoff champions West I Regional champions

College World Series, T-5th
- Conference: Pacific 10 Conference

Ranking
- Coaches: No. 5
- CB: No. 6
- Record: 49–18–1 (20–10 Pac-10)
- Head coach: Mark Marquess (6th season)
- Home stadium: Sunken Diamond

1982 Pacific-10 Conference baseball standings
	Conf.						Overall
Team	W		L		T	PCT	W		L		T	PCT
Northern
Oregon State ^{x}‍‍‍	16	–	8	–	0	.667	29	–	15	–	0	.659
Washington State ‍‍‍	16	–	8	–	0	.667	34	–	16	–	0	.680
Eastern Washington ‍‍‍	15	–	9	–	0	.625	24	–	28	–	0	.462
Portland State ‍‍‍	11	–	13	–	0	.458	27	–	23	–	0	.540
Gonzaga ‍‍‍	10	–	14	–	0	.417	30	–	28	–	0	.517
Washington ‍‍‍	10	–	14	–	0	.417	22	–	24	–	0	.478
Portland ‍‍‍	6	–	18	–	0	.250	19	–	24	–	1	.443
Southern
No. 9 Arizona State ^{x}‍‍‍^{y}	23	–	5	–	0	.821	58	–	15	–	0	.795
No. 5 Stanford ‍‍‍^{y}	20	–	10	–	0	.667	49	–	18	–	1	.728
Arizona ‍‍‍	15	–	14	–	0	.517	32	–	22	–	0	.593
UCLA ‍‍‍	11	–	19	–	0	.367	38	–	27	–	0	.585
California ‍‍‍	9	–	18	–	0	.333	29	–	32	–	0	.475
Southern California ‍‍‍	9	–	21	–	0	.300	23	–	36	–	0	.390
x – Division champion y – Invited to the NCAA tournament As of June 30, 1982; Rankings from Collegiate Baseball

The 1982 Stanford Cardinal baseball team represented Stanford University in the 1982 NCAA Division I baseball season. The Cardinal played their home games at Sunken Diamond. The team was coached by Mark Marquess in his 6th year at Stanford.

The Cardinal won the Pacific-10 Conference Playoff and the West I Regional to advanced to the College World Series, where they were defeated by the Maine.

== Roster ==
1982 Stanford Cardinal baseball team
Players
Coaches

#	Pos.	Name	B/T	Height	Weight	Year	Home town
	INF	Mike Aldrete	/	—	—	Jr
	P	Jeff Ballard	/	—	—	Fr
		Chris Britt	/	—	—
		Steve Buechele	/	—	—
	P	Steve Cottrell	/	—	—	So
		Loring Davies	/	—	—
	INF	Bob DeCosta	/	—	—
	OF	Mike Dotterer	/	—	—	Jr
	P	Doug Gwaltney	/	—	—
	INF	Eric Hardgrave	/	—	—	Jr
	P	David Harris	/	—	—
	C	Bob Hausladen	/	—	—
	P	Gregg Lomnicky	/	—	—	So
		Greg Lorenzetti	/	—	—
		Rick Lundblade	/	—	—	Fr
		James McFarlane	/	—	—
		McNally	/	—	—
	P	Brian Mignano	/	—	—
	P	Brian Myers	/	—	—	So
	P	Pierce	/	—	—
	P	John Radtke	/	—	—
	INF	Vince Sakowski	/	—	—
		Lyle Smith	/	—	—
	P	Stack	/	—	—
		Pete Stanicek	/	—	—	Fr
		Darryl Stephens	/	—	—	Jr
		Mike Sullivan	/	—	—
	OF	Mike Toothman	/	—	—	Sr
	INF	John Verducci	/	—	—	Fr
		Warner	/	—	—
		Winkler	/	—	—

Head coach

Mark Marquess

Assistant coach(es)

Legend

- (C) Team captain
- (S) Suspended
- (I) Ineligible
- Injured
- Current redshirt

Roster
Last update: December 25, 2020

== Schedule ==
1982 Stanford Cardinal baseball game log
Regular season
January (3–0)

#	Date	Opponent	Site/stadium	Score	Overall record	Pac-10 record
1	January 29	San Francisco	Sunken Diamond • Stanford, California	6–1	1–0	–
2	January 30	San Francisco	Sunken Diamond • Stanford, California	7–6	2–0	–
3	January 30	San Francisco	Sunken Diamond • Stanford, California	3–0	3–0	–

February (13–2–1)

#	Date	Opponent	Site/stadium	Score	Overall record	Pac-10 record
4	February 2	Fresno State	Sunken Diamond • Stanford, California	8–0	4–0	–
5	February 5	Cal State Fullerton	Sunken Diamond • Stanford, California	2–0	5–0	–
6	February 6	Cal State Fullerton	Sunken Diamond • Stanford, California	3–10	5–1	–
7	February 6	Cal State Fullerton	Sunken Diamond • Stanford, California	5–4	6–1	–
8	February 7	UC Davis	Sunken Diamond • Stanford, California	8–0	7–1	–
9	February 10	Cal State Hayward	Sunken Diamond • Stanford, California	7–1	8–1	–
10	February 12	San Jose State	Sunken Diamond • Stanford, California	8–0	9–1	–
11	February 14	San Jose State	Sunken Diamond • Stanford, California	7–4	10–1	–
12	February 18	Santa Clara	Sunken Diamond • Stanford, California	2–2	10–1–1	–
13	February 19	Cal Poly Pomona	Sunken Diamond • Stanford, California	5–2	11–1–1	–
14	February 20	Pepperdine	Sunken Diamond • Stanford, California	4–2	12–1–1	–
15	February 20	Pepperdine	Sunken Diamond • Stanford, California	3–2	13–1–1	–
16	February 22	at San Jose State	San Jose Municipal Stadium • San Jose, California	15–3	14–1–1	–
17	February 26	California	Sunken Diamond • Stanford, California	6–2	15–1–1	1–0
18	February 27	at California	Evans Diamond • Berkeley, California	1–2	15–2–1	1–1
19	February 28	California	Sunken Diamond • Stanford, California	9–1	16–2–1	2–1

March (13–5)

#	Date	Opponent	Site/stadium	Score	Overall record	Pac-10 record
20	March 3	Santa Clara	Sunken Diamond • Stanford, California	2–1	17–2–1	2–1
21	March 5	at Southern California	Dedeaux Field • Los Angeles, California	12–7	18–2–1	3–1
22	March 6	at Southern California	Dedeaux Field • Los Angeles, California	11–5	19–2–1	4–1
23	March 7	at Southern California	Dedeaux Field • Los Angeles, California	11–4	20–2–1	5–1
24	March 9	San Francisco State	Sunken Diamond • Stanford, California	10–8	21–2–1	5–1
25	March 12	Arizona	Sunken Diamond • Stanford, California	2–1	22–2–1	6–1
26	March 13	Arizona	Sunken Diamond • Stanford, California	10–7	23–2–1	7–1
27	March 13	Arizona	Sunken Diamond • Stanford, California	9–5	24–2–1	8–1
28	March 20	at UCLA	Jackie Robinson Stadium • Los Angeles, California	11–5	25–2–1	9–1
29	March 20	at UCLA	Jackie Robinson Stadium • Los Angeles, California	5–7	25–3–1	9–2
30	March 21	at UCLA	Jackie Robinson Stadium • Los Angeles, California	11–8	26–3–1	10–2
31	March 22	at UC Riverside	Unknown • Riverside, California	7–4	27–3–1	10–2
32	March 22	vs Wisconsin	Unknown • Riverside, California	22–1	28–3–1	10–2
33	March 23	vs Washington	Unknown • Riverside, California	3–1	29–3–1	10–2
34	March 23	vs Tulane	Unknown • Riverside, California	4–5	29–4–1	10–2
35	March 26	vs Maine	Unknown • Riverside, California	4–7	29–5–1	10–2
36	March 26	vs BYU	Unknown • Riverside, California	2–4	29–6–1	10–2
37	March 27	vs Oral Roberts	Unknown • Riverside, California	2–3	29–7–1	10–2

April (7–9)

#	Date	Opponent	Site/stadium	Score	Overall record	Pac-10 record
38	April 2	at Arizona State	Packard Stadium • Tempe, Arizona	4–15	29–8–1	10–3
39	April 3	at Arizona State	Packard Stadium • Tempe, Arizona	7–8	29–9–1	10–4
40	April 4	at Arizona State	Packard Stadium • Tempe, Arizona	5–19	29–10–1	10–5
41	April 5	at Arizona	Jerry Kindall Field at Frank Sancet Stadium • Tucson, Arizona	4–7	29–11–1	10–6
42	April 6	at Arizona	Jerry Kindall Field at Frank Sancet Stadium • Tucson, Arizona	19–7	30–11–1	11–6
43	April 7	at Arizona	Jerry Kindall Field at Frank Sancet Stadium • Tucson, Arizona	2–4	30–12–1	11–7
44	April 12	San Jose State	Sunken Diamond • Stanford, California	2–0	31–12–1	11–7
45	April 13	at Santa Clara	Buck Shaw Stadium • Santa Clara, California	8–2	32–12–1	11–7
46	April 17	UCLA	Sunken Diamond • Stanford, California	3–4	32–13–1	11–8
47	April 17	UCLA	Sunken Diamond • Stanford, California	9–3	33–13–1	12–8
48	April 18	UCLA	Sunken Diamond • Stanford, California	16–5	34–13–1	13–8
49	April 19	Arizona State	Sunken Diamond • Stanford, California	8–0	35–13–1	14–8
50	April 20	Arizona State	Sunken Diamond • Stanford, California	7–12	35–14–1	14–9
51	April 21	Arizona State	Sunken Diamond • Stanford, California	3–15	35–15–1	14–10
52	April 27	at Fresno State	Varsity Park • Fresno, California	3–6	35–16–1	14–10
53	April 30	Southern California	Sunken Diamond • Stanford, California	9–3	36–16–1	15–10

May (7–0)

#	Date	Opponent	Site/stadium	Score	Overall record	Pac-10 record
54	May 1	Southern California	Sunken Diamond • Stanford, California	12–5	37–16–1	16–10
55	May 2	Southern California	Sunken Diamond • Stanford, California	6–5	38–16–1	17–10
56	May 4	at Santa Clara	Buck Shaw Stadium • Santa Clara, California	13–6	39–16–1	17–10
57	May 6	at Sonoma State	Unknown • Rohnert Park, California	15–6	40–16–1	17–10
58	May 14	at California	Evans Diamond • Berkeley, California	7–5	41–16–1	18–10
59	May 15	California	Sunken Diamond • Stanford, California	8–5	42–16–1	19–10
60	May 16	at California	Evans Diamond • Berkeley, California	9–3	43–16–1	20–10

Postseason
Pac-10 Playoff (2–0)

#	Date	Opponent	Site/stadium	Score	Overall record	Pac-10 record
61	May 18	Oregon State	Sunken Diamond • Stanford, California	15–6	44–16–1	20–10
62	May 19	Oregon State	Sunken Diamond • Stanford, California	15–4	45–16–1	20–10

NCAA West I Regional (3–0)

#	Date	Opponent	Site/stadium	Score	Overall record	Pac-10 record
63	May 27	Hawaii	Sunken Diamond • Stanford, California	10–5	46–16–1	20–10
64	May 28	Fresno State	Sunken Diamond • Stanford, California	17–10	47–16–1	20–10
65	May 29	Pepperdine	Sunken Diamond • Stanford, California	15–8	48–16–1	20–10

College World Series (1–2)

#	Date	Opponent	Site/stadium	Score	Overall record	Pac-10 record
66	June 5	vs South Carolina	Johnny Rosenblatt Stadium • Omaha, Nebraska	15–4	49–16–1	20–10
67	June 8	vs Texas	Johnny Rosenblatt Stadium • Omaha, Nebraska	6–8	49–17–1	20–10
68	June 9	vs Maine	Johnny Rosenblatt Stadium • Omaha, Nebraska	5–8	49–18–1	20–10

== Awards and honors ==
Mike Aldrete

- Third Team All-American Baseball America

Bob DeCosta

- First Team All-Pac-10

Mike Dotterer

- First Team All-Pac-10
- Second Team All-American Baseball America

Eric Hardgrave

- Second Team All-American Baseball America

Bob Hausladen

- First Team All-Pac-10

Brian Mignano

- First Team All-Pac-10
