= 1982 Texas Longhorns baseball team =

American college baseball season

1982 Texas Longhorns baseball

NCAA Central Regional champions SWC tournament champions SWC champions

College World Series, 2–2
- Conference: Southwest Conference
- Record: 59–6 (12–4 SWC)
- Head coach: Cliff Gustafson (15th year)
- Home stadium: Disch–Falk Field

1982 Southwest Conference baseball standings
	Conf.				Overall
Team	W		L	PCT	W		L	PCT
No. 4 Texas ‍†‍‡‍^{y}	12	–	4	.750	59	–	6	.908
No. 21 Houston ‍‍‍^{y}	13	–	6	.684	42	–	14	.750
Arkansas ‍‍‍	13	–	8	.619	40	–	15	.727
Texas A&M ‍‍‍	10	–	10	.500	33	–	19	.635
Texas Tech ‍‍‍	9	–	12	.429	21	–	22	.488
Baylor ‍‍‍	9	–	12	.429	25	–	22	.532
Rice ‍‍‍	8	–	13	.381	34	–	23	.596
TCU ‍‍‍	4	–	15	.211	16	–	25	.390
† – Conference champion ‡ – Tournament champion y – Invited to the NCAA tournament As of June 30, 1982; Rankings from Collegiate Baseball

The 1982 Texas Longhorns baseball team represented the University of Texas at Austin in the 1982 NCAA Division I baseball season. The Longhorns played their home games at Disch–Falk Field. The team was coached by Cliff Gustafson in his 15th season at Texas.

The Longhorns reached the College World Series, finishing fourth with wins over Oklahoma State and Stanford and losses to eventual champion Miami (FL) and runner-up Wichita State.

== Personnel ==
=== Roster ===
1982 Texas Longhorns roster
Pitchers: 14 - Kirk Killingsworth; 19 - Mike Capel; 21 - Roger Clemens; 25 - Calvin Schiraldi; Catchers: 12 - Jeff Hearron	Infielders: 1 - Spike Owen; 3 - Mike Brumley; 6 - David Denny; 24 - Randy Day; Outfielders: 31 - Tracy Dophied	Unknown: 2 - Bryan Burrows; 4 - Milo Choate; 5 - Johnny Sutton; 8 - Mike Trent; 9 - Harlan Robertson; 10 - Rusty Uresti; 11 - Mike Livermore; 13 - Mark Reynolds; 22 - Tim Reynolds; 23 - Mike Konderla; 28 - Randy Richards; 33 - Mike Simon

== Schedule and results ==
Legend
Texas win
Texas loss
Tie

1982 Texas Longhorns baseball game log
Regular season

February
Date	Opponent	Site/stadium	Score	Overall record	SWC record
Feb 19	Midwestern State*	Disch–Falk Field • Austin, TX	W 12–0	1–0	
Feb 19	Midwestern State*	Disch–Falk Field • Austin, TX	W 11–6	2–0	
Feb 20	Texas Lutheran*	Disch–Falk Field • Austin, TX	W 7–1	3–0	
Feb 20	Texas Lutheran*	Disch–Falk Field • Austin, TX	W 7–5	4–0	
Feb 23	Lubbock Christian*	Disch–Falk Field • Austin, TX	W 2–1	5–0	
Feb 23	Lubbock Christian*	Disch–Falk Field • Austin, TX	W 5–2	6–0	
Feb 27	Louisiana Tech*	Disch–Falk Field • Austin, TX	W 5–4	7–0	
Feb 27	Louisiana Tech*	Disch–Falk Field • Austin, TX	W 15–4	8–0	

March
Date	Opponent	Site/stadium	Score	Overall record	SWC record
Mar 1	Wichita State*	Disch–Falk Field • Austin, TX	W 2–0	9–0	
Mar 1	Wichita State*	Disch–Falk Field • Austin, TX	W 12–0	10–0	
Mar 2	Hardin–Simmons*	Disch–Falk Field • Austin, TX	W 11–4	11–0	
Mar 2	Hardin–Simmons*	Disch–Falk Field • Austin, TX	W 9–1	12–0	
Mar 6	Texas–Arlington*	Disch–Falk Field • Austin, TX	W 4–1	13–0	
Mar 6	Texas–Arlington*	Disch–Falk Field • Austin, TX	W 12–4	14–0	
Mar 7	Texas–Arlington*	Disch–Falk Field • Austin, TX	W 10–3	15–0	
Mar 7	Texas–Arlington*	Disch–Falk Field • Austin, TX	W 8–3	16–0	
Mar 10	Lamar*	Disch–Falk Field • Austin, TX	W 12–8	17–0	
Mar 10	Lamar*	Disch–Falk Field • Austin, TX	W 11–5	18–0	
Mar 11	Lamar*	Disch–Falk Field • Austin, TX	W 2–1	19–0	
Mar 11	Lamar*	Disch–Falk Field • Austin, TX	W 6–4	20–0	
Mar 12	Texas Wesleyan*	Disch–Falk Field • Austin, TX	W 4–3	21–0	
Mar 12	Texas Wesleyan*	Disch–Falk Field • Austin, TX	W 10–0	22–0	
Mar 13	Texas Wesleyan*	Disch–Falk Field • Austin, TX	W 8–1	23–0	
Mar 13	Texas Wesleyan*	Disch–Falk Field • Austin, TX	W 3–0	24–0	
Mar 14	Emporia State*	Disch–Falk Field • Austin, TX	W 15–5	25–0	
Mar 14	Emporia State*	Disch–Falk Field • Austin, TX	W 13–7	26–0	
Mar 15	Emporia State*	Disch–Falk Field • Austin, TX	W 7–5	27–0	
Mar 15	Emporia State*	Disch–Falk Field • Austin, TX	W 14–3	28–0	
Mar 16	Southwestern*	Disch–Falk Field • Austin, TX	W 10–3	29–0	
Mar 16	Southwestern*	Disch–Falk Field • Austin, TX	W 5–1	30–0	
Mar 19	Texas A&M	Disch–Falk Field • Austin, TX	W 11–2	31–0	1–0
Mar 20	Texas A&M	Disch–Falk Field • Austin, TX	W 8–3	32–0	2–0
Mar 20	Texas A&M	Disch–Falk Field • Austin, TX	W 16–2	33–0	3–0
Mar 26	at Houston	Cougar Field • Houston, TX	L 3–4	33–1	3–1
Mar 30	St. Mary's*	Disch–Falk Field • Austin, TX	W 5–4	34–1	
Mar 30	St. Mary's*	Disch–Falk Field • Austin, TX	W 9–1	35–1	

April/May
Date	Opponent	Site/stadium	Score	Overall record	SWC record
Apr 2	Arkansas*	Disch–Falk Field • Austin, TX	L 1–8	35–2	3–2
Apr 3	Arkansas*	Disch–Falk Field • Austin, TX	W 11–5	36–2	4–2
Apr 3	Arkansas*	Disch–Falk Field • Austin, TX	W 5–2	37–2	5–2
Apr 6	San Antonio Dodgers*	Disch–Falk Field • Austin, TX	L 4–5	(Exh.)	
Apr 10	at TCU	TCU Diamond • Fort Worth, TX	W 6–4	38–2	6–2
Apr 11	at TCU	TCU Diamond • Fort Worth, TX	W 9–1	39–2	7–2
Apr 16	Baylor	Disch–Falk Field • Austin, TX	W 6–4	40–2	8–2
Apr 17	Baylor	Disch–Falk Field • Austin, TX	L 3–9	40–3	8–3
Apr 17	Baylor	Disch–Falk Field • Austin, TX	W 3–2	41–3	9–3
Apr 23	at Rice	Cameron Field • Houston, TX	W 4–0	42–3	10–3
Apr 26	at Rice	Cameron Field • Houston, TX	W 6–3	43–3	11–3
Apr 26	at Rice	Cameron Field • Houston, TX	L 6–8	43–4	11–4
May 2	at Texas Tech	Tech Diamond • Lubbock, TX	W 9–7	44–4	12–4
May 9	Sam Houston State*	Disch–Falk Field • Austin, TX	W 7–4	45–4	
May 9	Sam Houston State*	Disch–Falk Field • Austin, TX	W 10–3	46–4	

Postseason

SWC Tournament
Date	Opponent	Site/stadium	Score	Overall record	SWCT Record
May 14	Texas A&M	Olsen Field • College Station, TX	W 12–7	47–4	1–0
May 15	Arkansas	Olsen Field • College Station, TX	W 8–0	48–4	2–0
May 16	Houston	Olsen Field • College Station, TX	W 10–5	49–4	3–0

May
Date	Opponent	Site/stadium	Score	Overall record
May 21	Lubbock Christian	Disch–Falk Field • Austin, TX	W 5–3	50–4
May 21	Lubbock Christian	Disch–Falk Field • Austin, TX	W 6–0	51–4
May 22	Lubbock Christian	Disch–Falk Field • Austin, TX	W 7–2	52–4
May 22	Lubbock Christian	Disch–Falk Field • Austin, TX	W 9–2	53–4

NCAA Central Regional
Date	Opponent	Site/stadium	Score	Overall record	NCAAT record
May 28	Hardin–Simmons	Disch–Falk Field • Austin, TX	W 10–0	54–4	1–0
May 29	Oklahoma	Disch–Falk Field • Austin, TX	W 8–0	55–4	2–0
May 30	Eastern Michigan	Disch–Falk Field • Austin, TX	W 7–2^{11}	56–4	3–0
May 31	Eastern Michigan	Disch–Falk Field • Austin, TX	W 9–1	57–4	4–0

College World Series
Date	Opponent	Site/stadium	Score	Overall record	CWS record
June 5	Oklahoma State	Johnny Rosenblatt Stadium • Omaha, NE	W 9–1	58–4	1–0
June 8	Stanford	Johnny Rosenblatt Stadium • Omaha, NE	W 8–6^{12}	59–4	2–0
June 10	Miami (FL)	Johnny Rosenblatt Stadium • Omaha, NE	L 1–2	59–5	2–1
June 11	Wichita State	Johnny Rosenblatt Stadium • Omaha, NE	L 4–8	59–6	2–2
