= 1982 Oklahoma State Cowboys baseball team =

Baseball team

1982 Oklahoma State Cowboys baseball

Big Eight champions Midwest Regional champions

College World Series, T-5th
- Conference: Big Eight Conference
- CB: No. 6
- Record: 57–16 (19–5 Big 8)
- Head coach: Gary Ward (5th season)
- Assistant coach: Wade Robertson
- Pitching coach: Tom Holliday (5th season)
- Home stadium: Allie P. Reynolds Stadium

1982 Big Eight Conference baseball standings
	Conf.				Overall
Team	W		L	PCT	W		L	PCT
No. 6 Oklahoma State ‍†‍‡‍^{y}	19	–	5	.792	57	–	16	.781
No. 19 Nebraska ‍‍‍	15	–	5	.750	44	–	13	.772
Oklahoma ‍‍‍	11	–	6	.647	35	–	25	.583
Missouri ‍‍‍	12	–	9	.571	38	–	17	.691
Kansas ‍‍‍	10	–	14	.417	23	–	27	.460
Iowa State ‍‍‍	6	–	18	.250	26	–	26	.500
Kansas State ‍‍‍	4	–	20	.167	29	–	27	.518
† – Conference champion ‡ – Tournament champion y – Invited to the NCAA tournament As of June 30, 1982; Rankings from Collegiate Baseball

The 1982 Oklahoma State Cowboys baseball team represented the Oklahoma State University in the 1982 NCAA Division I baseball season. The Cowboys played their home games at Allie P. Reynolds Stadium. The team was coached by Gary Ward in his 5th year at Oklahoma State.

The Cowboys won the Midwest Regional to advance to the College World Series, where they were defeated by the Wichita State Shockers.

== Roster ==
1982 Oklahoma State Cowboys baseball team
Players
Coaches

#	Pos.	Name	B/T	Height	Weight	Year	Home town
	LHP	Tony Bartiolomucci	/L	—	—
	OF	Stan Baughn	S/R	5 ft 10 in (1.78 m)	160 lb (73 kg)	Sr	Bartlesville, Oklahoma
	RHP	John Blankenship	/R	—	—
	C	Michael Day	/	—	—
	OF	Benji de la Rosa	/	—	—
	RHP	John Duval	/R	—	—
	OF	Glenn Edwards	R/R	6 ft 0 in (1.83 m)	170 lb (77 kg)
	RHP	John Farrell	R/R	6 ft 4 in (1.93 m)	210 lb (95 kg)		Monmouth Beach, New Jersey
	RHP	Matt Ford	/R	—	—
	INF	Kevin Fowler	/	—	—
	INF	Don Freeman	S/R	6 ft 0 in (1.83 m)	170 lb (77 kg)
	INF	Gary Green	R/R	6 ft 3 in (1.91 m)	175 lb (79 kg)		Pittsburgh, Pennsylvania
	RHP	Roger Hoeltzel	/R	—	—
1	OF	James Hudson	R/R	5 ft 8 in (1.73 m)	165 lb (75 kg)	Sr	Lake Elsinore, California
	RHP	Gary Kanwisher	/R	6 ft 3 in (1.91 m)	200 lb (91 kg)		Hillsdale, New Jersey
	INF	Bruce Kipper	/	—	—
	OF	Tim Knapp	L/	—	—		Lima, Oklahoma
	OF	Bryan Kostishion	/	—	—
	RHP	Kurt Leiter	/R	—	—
10	LHP	Dennis Livingston	R/L	6 ft 0 in (1.83 m)	185 lb (84 kg)	So	North Reading, Massachusetts
	RHP	Danny McDede	/R	—	—
	INF	Steve O'Donnell	S/R	5 ft 11 in (1.8 m)	165 lb (75 kg)		Connellsville, Pennsylvania
	C	Arnoldo Pacheco	/	—	—
	INF	Clint Ramsey	/	—	—
	RHP	Andy Pavlovic	/R	—	—
	OF	Dale Rath	/	—	—
34	INF	Jim Traber	L/L	6 ft 0 in (1.83 m)	194 lb (88 kg)	Jr	Columbia, Maryland
	LHP	Craig Trice	/L	—	—
		Scott Wade	R/R	6 ft 2 in (1.88 m)	200 lb (91 kg)		Seabrook, Maryland
	INF	Randy Whisler	R/R	5 ft 9 in (1.75 m)	170 lb (77 kg)		Klamath Falls, Oregon
	C	Robbie Wine	R/R	6 ft 2 in (1.88 m)	190 lb (86 kg)		Norristown, Pennsylvania
	INF	Steve Yoder	/	—	—

Head coach

Gary Ward

Assistant coach(es)

Wade Robertson

Pitching coach(es)

Tom Holliday

Legend

- (C) Team captain
- (S) Suspended
- (I) Ineligible
- Injured
- Current redshirt

Roster
Last update: February 28, 2021

== Schedule ==
1982 Oklahoma State Cowboys baseball game log
Regular season
February (1–1)

#	Date	Opponent	Site/stadium	Score	Overall record	Big 8 record
1	February 27	vs Western Michigan	Joker Marchant Stadium • Lakeland, Florida	1–3	0–1	–
2	February 28	vs Eastern Michigan	Joker Marchant Stadium • Lakeland, Florida	13–2	1–1	–

March (22–7)

#	Date	Opponent	Site/stadium	Score	Overall record	Big 8 record
3	March 1	vs Evansville	Joker Marchant Stadium • Lakeland, Florida	5–4	2–1	–
4	March 1	vs Western Michigan	Joker Marchant Stadium • Lakeland, Florida	5–7	2–2	–
5	March 2	vs Western Michigan	Joker Marchant Stadium • Lakeland, Florida	11–8	3–2	–
6	March 3	vs Evansville	Joker Marchant Stadium • Lakeland, Florida	11–5	4–2	–
7	March 3	vs Evansville	Joker Marchant Stadium • Lakeland, Florida	5–1	5–2	–
8	March 4	vs Eastern Michigan	Joker Marchant Stadium • Lakeland, Florida	3–2	6–2	–
9	March 6	vs Purdue	Joker Marchant Stadium • Lakeland, Florida	4–1	7–2	–
10	March 6	vs Eastern Michigan	Joker Marchant Stadium • Lakeland, Florida	1–0	8–2	–
11	March 8	vs Baylor	Unknown • Edinburg, Texas	1–0	9–2	–
12	March 9	vs Baylor	Unknown • Edinburg, Texas	4–3	10–2	–
13	March 9	at Texas–Pan American	Unknown • Edinburg, Texas	6–1	11–2	–
14	March 10	at Texas–Pan American	Unknown • Edinburg, Texas	8–9	11–3	–
15	March 11	vs Baylor	Unknown • Edinburg, Texas	10–4	12–3	–
16	March 12	vs Baylor	Unknown • Edinburg, Texas	6–2	13–3	–
17	March 12	at Texas–Pan American	Unknown • Edinburg, Texas	6–7	13–4	–
18	March 12	at Texas–Pan American	Unknown • Edinburg, Texas	4–5	13–5	–
19	March 19	South Dakota State	Allie P. Reynolds Stadium • Stillwater, Oklahoma	15–0	14–5	–
20	March 19	South Dakota State	Allie P. Reynolds Stadium • Stillwater, Oklahoma	20–0	15–5	–
21	March 20	South Dakota State	Allie P. Reynolds Stadium • Stillwater, Oklahoma	7–4	16–5	–
22	March 20	South Dakota State	Allie P. Reynolds Stadium • Stillwater, Oklahoma	13–3	17–5	–
23	March 23	North Dakota State	Allie P. Reynolds Stadium • Stillwater, Oklahoma	13–1	18–5	–
24	March 24	North Dakota State	Allie P. Reynolds Stadium • Stillwater, Oklahoma	23–1	19–5	–
25	March 24	North Dakota State	Allie P. Reynolds Stadium • Stillwater, Oklahoma	7–5	20–5	–
26	March 27	at Nebraska	Buck Beltzer Stadium • Lincoln, Nebraska	4–2	21–5	1–0
27	March 27	at Nebraska	Buck Beltzer Stadium • Lincoln, Nebraska	3–4	21–6	1–1
28	March 28	at Nebraska	Buck Beltzer Stadium • Lincoln, Nebraska	4–11	21–7	1–2
29	March 29	at Nebraska	Buck Beltzer Stadium • Lincoln, Nebraska	11–10	22–7	2–2
30	March 31	at Oklahoma City	Jim Wade Stadium • Oklahoma City, Oklahoma	14–4	23–7	2–2
31	March 31	at Oklahoma City	Jim Wade Stadium • Oklahoma City, Oklahoma	1–7	23–8	2–2

April (18–4)

#	Date	Opponent	Site/stadium	Score	Overall record	Big 8 record
32	April 3	Iowa State	Allie P. Reynolds Stadium • Stillwater, Oklahoma	18–4	24–8	3–2
33	April 3	Iowa State	Allie P. Reynolds Stadium • Stillwater, Oklahoma	20–7	25–8	4–2
34	April 4	Iowa State	Allie P. Reynolds Stadium • Stillwater, Oklahoma	9–7	26–8	5–2
35	April 4	Iowa State	Allie P. Reynolds Stadium • Stillwater, Oklahoma	0–3	26–9	5–3
36	April 9	at Oklahoma	Unknown • Norman, Oklahoma	5–7	26–10	5–4
37	April 10	at Oklahoma	Unknown • Norman, Oklahoma	7–1	27–10	6–4
38	April 10	at Oklahoma	Unknown • Norman, Oklahoma	21–8	28–10	7–4
39	April 11	at Oklahoma	Unknown • Norman, Oklahoma	12–11	29–10	8–4
39	April 14	Northeastern	Allie P. Reynolds Stadium • Stillwater, Oklahoma	9–2	30–10	8–4
40	April 16	Oklahoma City	Allie P. Reynolds Stadium • Stillwater, Oklahoma	7–6	31–10	8–4
41	April 17	Kansas State	Allie P. Reynolds Stadium • Stillwater, Oklahoma	12–3	32–10	9–4
42	April 17	Kansas State	Allie P. Reynolds Stadium • Stillwater, Oklahoma	10–1	33–10	10–4
43	April 18	Kansas State	Allie P. Reynolds Stadium • Stillwater, Oklahoma	15–2	34–10	11–4
44	April 18	Kansas State	Allie P. Reynolds Stadium • Stillwater, Oklahoma	10–8	35–10	12–4
45	April 21	Arkansas–Little Rock	Allie P. Reynolds Stadium • Stillwater, Oklahoma	10–0	36–10	12–4
46	April 21	Arkansas–Little Rock	Allie P. Reynolds Stadium • Stillwater, Oklahoma	7–4	37–10	12–4
47	April 22	Arkansas–Little Rock	Allie P. Reynolds Stadium • Stillwater, Oklahoma	13–0	38–10	12–4
48	April 23	Missouri Southern	Allie P. Reynolds Stadium • Stillwater, Oklahoma	26–12	39–10	12–4
49	April 24	Missouri Southern	Allie P. Reynolds Stadium • Stillwater, Oklahoma	8–7	40–10	12–4
50	April 24	Missouri Southern	Allie P. Reynolds Stadium • Stillwater, Oklahoma	14–0	41–10	12–4
51	April 27	at Wichita State	Shocker Field • Wichita, Kansas	3–8	41–11	12–4
52	April 28	at Oral Roberts	J. L. Johnson Stadium • Tulsa, Oklahoma	3–7	41–12	12–4

May (7–2)

#	Date	Opponent	Site/stadium	Score	Overall record	Big 8 record
53	May 1	at Missouri	Simmons Field • Columbia, Missouri	6–4	42–12	13–4
54	May 1	at Missouri	Simmons Field • Columbia, Missouri	7–4	43–12	14–4
55	May 2	at Missouri	Simmons Field • Columbia, Missouri	3–2	44–12	15–4
56	May 2	at Missouri	Simmons Field • Columbia, Missouri	5–4	45–12	16–4
57	May 4	Oklahoma City	Allie P. Reynolds Stadium • Stillwater, Oklahoma	6–8	45–13	16–4
58	May 8	Kansas	Allie P. Reynolds Stadium • Stillwater, Oklahoma	2–8	45–14	16–5
59	May 8	Kansas	Allie P. Reynolds Stadium • Stillwater, Oklahoma	2–1	46–14	17–5
60	May 9	Kansas	Allie P. Reynolds Stadium • Stillwater, Oklahoma	10–2	47–14	18–5
61	May 9	Kansas	Allie P. Reynolds Stadium • Stillwater, Oklahoma	14–7	48–14	19–5

Postseason
Big Eight Conference Tournament (3–0)

#	Date	Opponent	Site/stadium	Score	Overall record	Big 8 record
62	May 14	vs Missouri	Unknown • Oklahoma City, Oklahoma	19–8	49–14	19–5
63	May 15	vs Oklahoma	Unknown • Oklahoma City, Oklahoma	7–6	50–14	19–5
64	May 16	vs Oklahoma	Unknown • Oklahoma City, Oklahoma	5–3	51–14	19–5

May (2–0)

#	Date	Opponent	Site/stadium	Score	Overall record	Big 8 record
65	May 22	Hardin–Simmons	Allie P. Reynolds Stadium • Stillwater, Oklahoma	3–2	52–14	19–5
66	May 23	Hardin–Simmons	Allie P. Reynolds Stadium • Stillwater, Oklahoma	10–0	53–14	19–5

NCAA Midwest Regional (3–0)

#	Date	Opponent	Site/stadium	Score	Overall record	Big 8 record
67	May 27	Minnesota	Allie P. Reynolds Stadium • Stillwater, Oklahoma	16–9	54–14	19–5
68	May 28	Middle Tennessee	Allie P. Reynolds Stadium • Stillwater, Oklahoma	5–3	55–14	19–5
69	May 29	Middle Tennessee	Allie P. Reynolds Stadium • Stillwater, Oklahoma	7–3	56–14	19–5

College World Series (1–2)

#	Date	Opponent	Site/stadium	Score	Overall record	Big 8 record
70	June 5	vs Texas	Johnny Rosenblatt Stadium • Omaha, Nebraska	1–9	56–15	19–5
71	June 6	vs South Carolina	Johnny Rosenblatt Stadium • Omaha, Nebraska	10–8	57–15	19–5
72	June 9	vs Wichita State	Johnny Rosenblatt Stadium • Omaha, Nebraska	2–13	57–16	19–5

== Awards and honors ==
Benji de la Rosa

- Big Eight Conference All-Tournament Team
- Big Eight Conference Tournament MVP

Don Freeman

- Big Eight Conference All-Tournament Team

Gary Green

- All-Big Eight Conference
- Big Eight Conference All-Tournament Team

James Hudson

- All-Big Eight Conference

Gary Kanwisher

- Big Eight Conference All-Tournament Team

Kurt Leiter

- All-Big Eight Conference

Dennis Livingston

- Third Team All-American Baseball America

Scott Wade

- Big Eight Conference All-Tournament Team

Robbie Wine

- All-Big Eight Conference
- Big Eight Conference All-Tournament Team
- First Team All-American American Baseball Coaches Association
- Second Team All-American Baseball America
- The Sporting News College Baseball Player of the Year
