= Nelson Santovenia =

Cuban baseball player (born 1961)

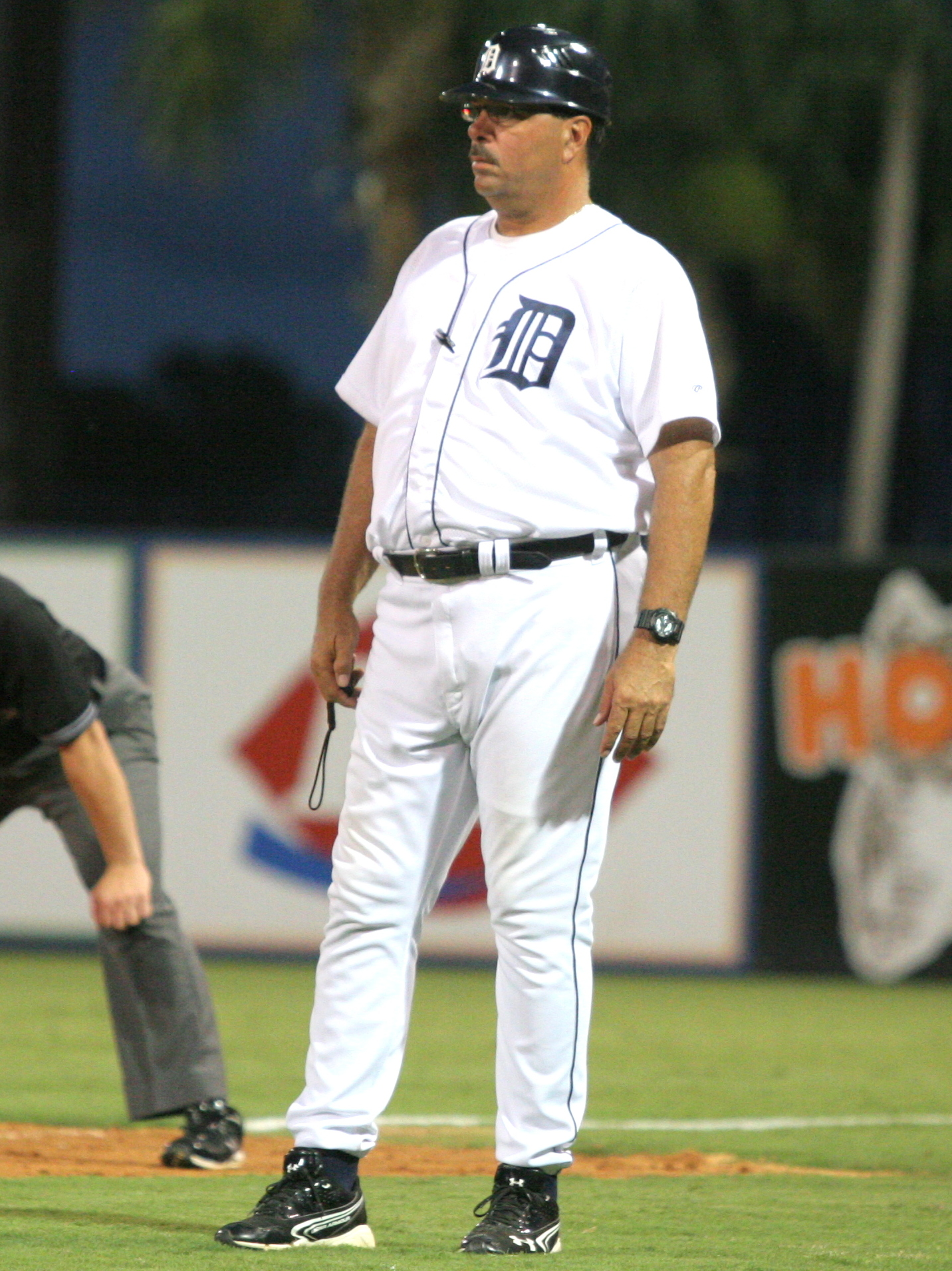
- Santovenia with the Gulf Coast League Tigers in 2012
- Catcher
- Born: July 27, 1961 (age 65); Pinar del Río, Cuba
- Batted: Right Threw: Right

MLB debut
- September 16, 1987, for the Montreal Expos

Last MLB appearance
- October 2, 1993, for the Kansas City Royals

MLB statistics
- Batting average: .233
- Home runs: 22
- Runs batted in: 116
- Stats at Baseball Reference

Teams
- Montreal Expos (1987–1991); Chicago White Sox (1992); Kansas City Royals (1993)

Nelson Gil Santovenia Mayol (born July 27, 1961) is a Cuban former professional baseball player who played in the Major Leagues primarily as a catcher from 1987 to 1993. He played college baseball at the University of Miami. He is currently the hitting coach for the Lakeland Flying Tigers.

== High school and college ==
Santovenia attended high school at Miami Southridge High School, graduating in 1979. Upon graduation, he was drafted by the Philadelphia Phillies in the 29th round of the 1979 amateur draft, but did not sign with them. Santovenia played college baseball for Miami Dade College for two years, then transferred to the University of Miami. In 1980, he played collegiate summer baseball with the Orleans Cardinals of the Cape Cod Baseball League. He was drafted by the Montreal Expos in the 3rd round of the 1981 Major League Baseball draft, but did not sign with the team. In his one year at Miami, Santovenia was a member of the Miami Hurricanes baseball championship team in 1982. In the final game of the 1982 College World Series, Miami beat Wichita State University, 9–3, and Santovenia was named to the all-tournament team for his role in the series. As a result of his playing he was drafted in the secondary phase of the 1982 draft, again by the Expos, with the 19th pick in the first round.

== Professional career ==
Upon signing with the Expos, Santovenia spent his first season as a member of the West Palm Beach Expos, playing alongside future star Andrés Galarraga. He played 40 games in West Palm Beach in 1982, and spent the full 1983 season with the Memphis Chicks. After spending the 1984 season with the Jacksonville Suns, he spent the next two seasons moving between the AA-level Suns and the AAA-level Indianapolis Indians. Santovenia spent most of the 1987 season with the Suns, playing 117 games for them. He had a batting average of .279, hit 19 home runs, and had a slugging percentage of .467.

Santovenia made his major league debut on September 16, 1987, against the New York Mets. He came in to give regular catcher Mike Fitzgerald some rest, and caught the ninth inning; his second and final appearance of the season came two days later against the Philadelphia Phillies, when he came in as a pinch hitter, getting his only at-bat of the season.

The following two seasons saw Santovenia splitting time at catcher with Fitzgerald. On July 28, 1989, Vince Coleman of the St. Louis Cardinals was caught stealing by Santovenia, ending Coleman's Major League streak of 50 consecutive stolen bases. He played in 92 games during the 1988 Montreal Expos season with a .236 batting average and eight home runs, and played in 97 games during the 1989 Montreal Expos season with a .250 batting average. However, by 1990 Santovenia's average had dipped below the Mendoza Line. He hit .190 that season in 59 games, and in 1991 he split time between Indianapolis and Montreal, hitting .261 and .250, respectively.

On December 9, 1991, Santovenia was released by the Montreal Expos, and on February 3, 1992, he signed as a free agent with the Chicago White Sox. He played in two games for the White Sox and played 91 games with the Vancouver Canadians in 1992, then was released. He signed with the Kansas City Royals as a free agent on December 10, 1992. Santovenia spent most of the season with the Omaha Royals, and spent four games with Kansas City in 1993, his final major league appearance coming on October 2, 1993. After another season with Omaha, where he hit .164 in 45 games, he retired.
