= Bryan Oelkers =

Spanish baseball player (born 1961)

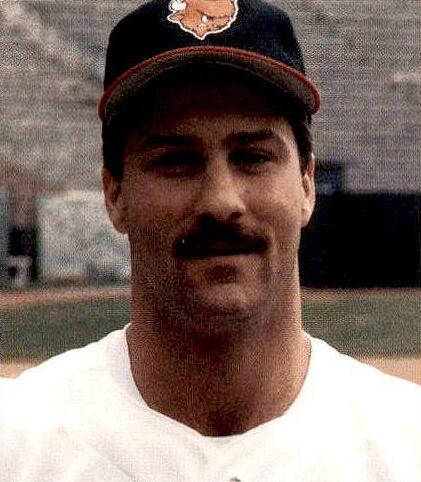
- Oelkers with the Buffalo Bisons c. 1987
- Pitcher
- Born: March 11, 1961 (age 65); Zaragoza, Aragon, Spain
- Batted: Left Threw: Left

MLB debut
- April 9, 1983, for the Minnesota Twins

Last MLB appearance
- October 3, 1986, for the Cleveland Indians

MLB statistics
- Win–loss record: 3–8
- Earned run average: 6.01
- Strikeouts: 46
- Stats at Baseball Reference

Teams
- Minnesota Twins (1983); Cleveland Indians (1986)

Bryan Alois Oelkers (/ˈɛlkərs/ ELK-ərs; born March 11, 1961) is a Spanish-born American former Major League Baseball pitcher. He attended Pattonville High School in Maryland Heights, Missouri and college at Wichita State. He batted and threw left-handed. He was drafted in the first round (4th pick overall) by the Minnesota Twins, one spot ahead of Dwight Gooden. Oelkers played two years in the majors — 1983 with the Minnesota Twins and 1986 with the Cleveland Indians. In 45 career games, he had a 3–8 record. In 103.1 innings, he allowed 126 hits with an ERA of 6.01. On August 16, 1986, Oelkers notched his only major league save in a 2–1 victory over the Orioles. He went 1/3 of an inning, retiring Jim Traber to preserve the victory. Oelkers preserved the win for Hall of Famer Phil Niekro.

He is the second of four Major Leaguers from Spain in history, along with Al Cabrera, Al Pardo, and Danny Rios.
