= Dan Smith (minor league pitcher) =

- Pitcher
- Born: February 23, 1962 (age 64)
- Throws: Left

Daniel Arthur Smith (born February 23, 1962) is an American baseball pitcher who is most notable for winning the 1982 College World Series Most Outstanding Player award while a junior at University of Miami. He is one of four players from University of Miami to win that award. The others are Greg Ellena, Pat Burrell and Charlton Jimerson.

Following his collegiate career, he played professionally for a few seasons. After being drafted by the Cincinnati Reds in the 10th round of the 1983 amateur draft, he began his professional career with the Billings Mustangs that very year. In 28 relief appearances, he went 5-2 with a 1.61 ERA, striking out 68 batters in 50 1/3 innings. He played for the Tampa Tarpons in 1984, appearing in 54 games and going 4-4 with a 2.55 ERA. Playing with the Cedar Rapids Reds in 1985, Smith went 3-7 with a 2.78 ERA in 42 games. He played for the Vermont Reds in 1986, going 5-3 with a 2.87 ERA in 41 games. For the 1987 season, he found himself in the Minnesota Twins organization, pitching for the Orlando Twins. He went 1-0 with a 5.23 ERA in 20 games that season.

He was inducted into the University of Miami's Hall of Fame in 1994. He served as head coach for the Miami Palmetto High School baseball team until 2023.
