= 1982 NCAA Division I baseball rankings =

1982 NCAA Division I baseball season

Tournament

College World Series
- Champions: Miami (FL)
- Runners-up: Wichita State
- MOP: Dan Smith (Miami (FL))

Seasons
- ← 1981 1983 →

The following polls make up the 1982 NCAA Division I baseball rankings. Baseball America began publishing its poll of the top 20 teams in college baseball in 1981. Collegiate Baseball Newspaper published its first human poll of the top 20 teams in college baseball in 1957, and expanded to rank the top 30 teams in 1961.

== Baseball America ==
Currently, only the final poll from the 1982 season is available.

Rank	Team
1	Wichita State
2	Texas
3	Arizona State
4	Miami (FL)
5	Oklahoma State
6	Stanford
7	Cal State Fullerton
8	Fresno State
9	Virginia Tech
10	Nebraska
11	South Carolina
12	Oral Roberts
13	Hawaii
14	Pepperdine
15	New Orleans
16	Florida State
17	Michigan
18	Maine
19	Houston
20	South Florida

== Collegiate Baseball ==
Currently, only the final poll from the 1982 season is available.

Rank	Team
1	Miami (FL)
2	Wichita State
3	Maine
4	Texas
5	Stanford
6	Oklahoma State
7	South Carolina
8	Cal State Fullerton
9	Arizona State
10	Pepperdine
11	New Orleans
12	Stetson
13	Fresno State
14	Middle Tennessee
15	Eastern Michigan
16	West Virginia
17	Oklahoma
18	Hawaii
19	Nebraska
20	Tulane
21	Houston
22	Florida State
23	The Citadel
24	South Florida
25	Navy
26	Minnesota
27	Delaware
28	Ohio State
29	Oral Roberts
30	San Diego State
