= 1982 NCAA Division I baseball tournament =

- Season: 1982
- Teams: 36
- Finals site: Johnny Rosenblatt Stadium; Omaha, Nebraska
- Champions: Miami (FL) (1st title)
- Runner-up: Wichita State (1st CWS Appearance)
- Winning coach: Ron Fraser (1st title)
- MOP: Dan Smith (Miami (FL))

The 1982 NCAA Division I baseball tournament was played at the end of the 1982 NCAA Division I baseball season to determine the national champion of college baseball. The tournament concluded with eight teams competing in the College World Series, a double-elimination tournament in its thirty sixth year. Eight regional competitions were held to determine the participants in the final event. Six regions held a four team, double-elimination tournament while two regions included six teams, resulting in 36 teams participating in the tournament at the conclusion of their regular season, and in some cases, after a conference tournament. The thirty-sixth tournament's champion was Miami (FL), coached by Ron Fraser. The Most Outstanding Player was Dan Smith of Miami (FL).

== National seeds ==
For the first time, the NCAA selected five number-one seeds and placed each in a different regional.

Bold indicates CWS participant.

- Arizona State
- Fresno State
- **Oklahoma State**
- **Texas**
- **Wichita State**

== Regionals ==
The opening rounds of the tournament were played across eight regional sites across the country, six consisting of four teams and two of six teams. The winners of each District advanced to the College World Series.

Bold indicates winner.

=== Atlantic Regional at Coral Gables, FL ===
Upper round 1
**South Florida**	**8**
Florida	0
**Miami (FL)**	**18**
Stetson	2
Lower round 1
Florida	4
**Stetson**	**5**

Upper final
South Florida	4
**Miami (FL)**	**9**
Lower final
South Florida	4
**Stetson**	**5**

Final
**Miami (FL)**	**15**	—
Stetson	3	—

=== Central Regional at Austin, TX ===
First round
**Eastern Michigan**	**7**
Florida State	2
**Oklahoma**	**5**
Ohio State	2
**Texas**	**10**
Hardin–Simmons	0

Second round
**Eastern Michigan**	**10**
Hardin–Simmons	2
Oklahoma	0
**Texas**	**8**
**Florida State**	**8**
Ohio State	3

Third round
Eastern Michigan	2
**Texas**	**7**^{11}
**Oklahoma**	**6**
Florida State	5

Semifinals
**Eastern Michigan**	**9**
Oklahoma	2

Final
**Texas**	**9**	—
Eastern Michigan	1	—

=== East Regional at Columbia, SC ===
First round
**Old Dominion**	**2**
East Carolina	1
**The Citadel**	**9**
North Carolina	4
**South Carolina**	**7**
West Virginia	0

Second round
Old Dominion	6
**West Virginia**	**7**^{10}
**East Carolina**	**1**
North Carolina	0
**South Carolina**	**6**
The Citadel	4
Old Dominion	6
**The Citadel**	**15**

Third round
**West Virginia**	**4**
East Carolina	1
**South Carolina**	**11**
The Citadel	2

Final
West Virginia	1	—
**South Carolina**	**2**	—

=== Midwest Regional at Stillwater, OK ===
Upper round 1
**Middle Tennessee**	**3**
Oral Roberts	2
**Oklahoma State**	**16**
Minnesota	9
Lower round 1
Oral Roberts	0
**Minnesota**	**9**

Upper final
Middle Tennessee	3
**Oklahoma State**	**5**
Lower final
**Middle Tennessee**	**7**
Minnesota	1

Final
**Oklahoma State**	**7**	—
Middle Tennessee	3	—

=== Northeast Regional at Orono, ME ===
Upper round 1
**Maine**	**6**
Seton Hall	4
**Delaware**	**4**
Navy	3
Lower round 1
Seton Hall	5
**Navy**	**15**

Upper final
**Maine**	**13**
Delaware	1
Lower final
**Navy**	**3**
Delaware	1

Final
**Maine**	4	—
Navy	3	—

=== South Regional at New Orleans, LA ===
Upper round 1
**Wichita State**	**3**
Jackson State	0
**New Orleans**	**7**
Tulane	5
Lower round 1
Jackson State	5
**Tulane**	**11**

Upper final
**Wichita State**	**7**
New Orleans	0
Lower final
**New Orleans**	**5**^{10}
Tulane	4

Final
**Wichita State**	**8**	—
New Orleans	1	—

=== West I Regional at Fresno, CA ===
Upper round 1
**Stanford**	**10**
Hawaii	5
**Fresno State**	**14**
Pepperdine	5
Lower round 1
Hawaii	9
**Pepperdine**	**13**

Upper final
**Stanford**	**17**
Fresno State	10
Lower final
Fresno State	8
**Pepperdine**	**11**

Final
**Stanford**	**15**	—
Pepperdine	8	—

=== West II Regional at Tempe, AZ ===
Upper round 1
**Cal State Fullerton**	**7**
Houston	3
**Arizona State**	**6**
San Diego State	1
Lower round 1
San Diego State	3
**Houston**	**13**

Upper final
**Cal State Fullerton**	**10**
Arizona State	9
Lower final
**Arizona State**	**9**
Houston	5

Final
**Cal State Fullerton**	**8**	—
Arizona State	7	—

== College World Series ==
=== Participants ===
School	Conference	Record (conference)	Head coach	CWS appearances	CWS best finish	CWS record
Cal State Fullerton	SCBA	51–21 (23–5)	Augie Garrido	2 (last: 1979)	1st (1979)	5–3
Maine	Eastern Collegiate	32–12 (n/a)	John Winkin	3 (last: 1981)	3rd (1964)	5–6
Miami (FL)	n/a	49–18–1 (n/a)	Ron Fraser	5 (last: 1981)	2nd (1974)	8–10
Oklahoma State	Big 8	56–14 (19–5)	Gary Ward	9 (last: 1981)	1st (1959)	22–17
South Carolina	n/a	45–11 (n/a)	June Raines	3 (last: 1981)	2nd (1975, 1977)	9–6
Stanford	Pac-10	48–16–1 (20–10)	Mark Marquess	2 (last: 1967)	3rd (1967)	4–4
Texas	SWC	57–4 (12–4)	Cliff Gustafson	19 (last: 1981)	1st (1949, 1950, 1975)	41–34
Wichita State	MVC	70–12 (15–1)	Gene Stephenson	0 (last: none)	none	0–0

=== Results ===
==== Bracket ====
Upper round 1
**Miami (FL)**	**7**
Maine	2
**Wichita State**	**7**
Cal State Fullerton	0
**Texas**	**9**
Oklahoma State	1
**Stanford**	**15**
South Carolina	4

Upper round 2
**Miami (FL)**	**4**
Wichita State	3
**Texas**	**8**^{12}
Stanford	6
Lower round 1
**Maine**	**6**
Cal State Fullerton	0
**Oklahoma State**	**10**
South Carolina	8

Upper final
**Miami (FL)**	**2**
Texas	1
Lower round 2
Stanford	5
**Maine**	**8**
**Wichita State**	**13**
Oklahoma State	2

Semifinals
**Miami (FL)**	**10**
Maine	4
Texas	4
**Wichita State**	**8**

Final
**Miami (FL)**	**9**
Wichita State	3

==== Game results ====
Date	Game	Winner	Score	Loser	Notes
June 4	Game 1	Miami (FL)	7–2	Maine	
June 4	Game 2	Wichita State	7–0	Cal State Fullerton	
June 5	Game 3	Texas	9–1	Oklahoma State	
June 5	Game 4	Stanford	15–4	South Carolina	
June 6	Game 5	Maine	6–0	Cal State Fullerton	Cal State Fullerton eliminated
June 6	Game 6	Oklahoma State	10–8	South Carolina	South Carolina eliminated
June 7	Game 7	Miami (FL)	4–3	Wichita State	
June 8	Game 8	Texas	8–6 (12 innings)	Stanford	
June 9	Game 9	Wichita State	13–2	Oklahoma State	Oklahoma State eliminated
June 9	Game 10	Maine	8–5	Stanford	Stanford eliminated
June 10	Game 11	Miami (FL)	2–1	Texas	
June 11	Game 12	Wichita State	8–4	Texas	Texas eliminated
June 11	Game 13	Miami (FL)	10–4	Maine	Maine eliminated
June 12	Final	Miami (FL)	9–3	Wichita State	Miami wins CWS

=== All-Tournament Team ===
The following players were members of the All-Tournament Team.

Position	Player	School
P	Bryan Oelkers	Wichita State
P	**Dan Smith (MOP)**	Miami (FL)
C	Nelson Santovenia	Miami (FL)
1B	Kevin Bernier	Maine
2B	Jim Thomas	Wichita State
3B	Phil Lane	Miami (FL)
SS	Spike Owen	Texas
OF	Mike Brumley	Texas
OF	Tim Gaskell	Wichita State
OF	Loren Hibbs	Wichita State
DH	Russ Morman	Wichita State

=== Notable players ===
- Cal State Fullerton: John Fishel, Bill Moore, Jeff Robinson, Shane Turner
- Maine: Joe Johnson, Bill Swift
- Miami (FL): Nelson Santovenia
- Oklahoma State: Gary Green, Jim Traber, Robbie Wine
- South Carolina: Kent Anderson, Don Gordon
- Stanford: Mike Aldrete, Jeff Ballard, Steve Buechele
- Texas: Mike Brumley, Mike Capel, Roger Clemens, Jeff Hearron, Spike Owen, Calvin Schiraldi
- Wichita State: Don Heinkel, Russ Morman, Charlie O'Brien, Bryan Oelkers, Phil Stephenson

== See also ==
- 1982 NCAA Division II baseball tournament
- 1982 NCAA Division III baseball tournament
- 1982 NAIA World Series
