= 1983 College Baseball All-America Team =

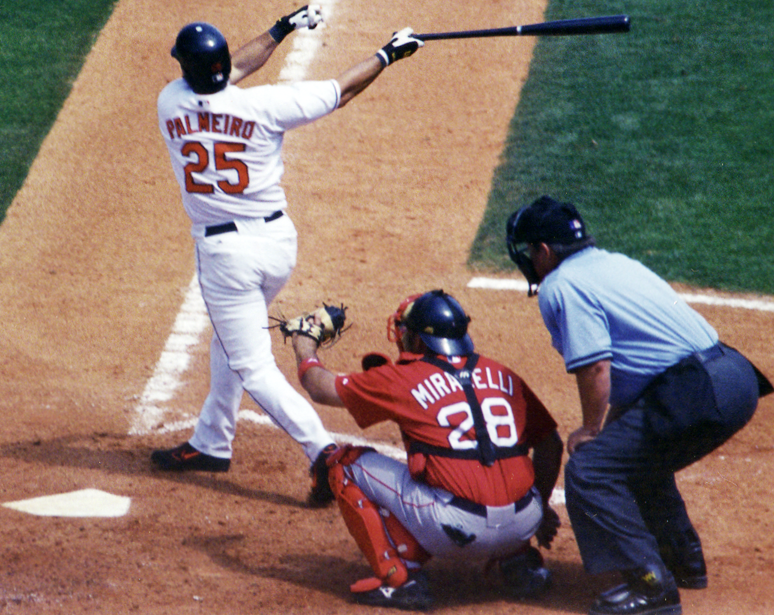
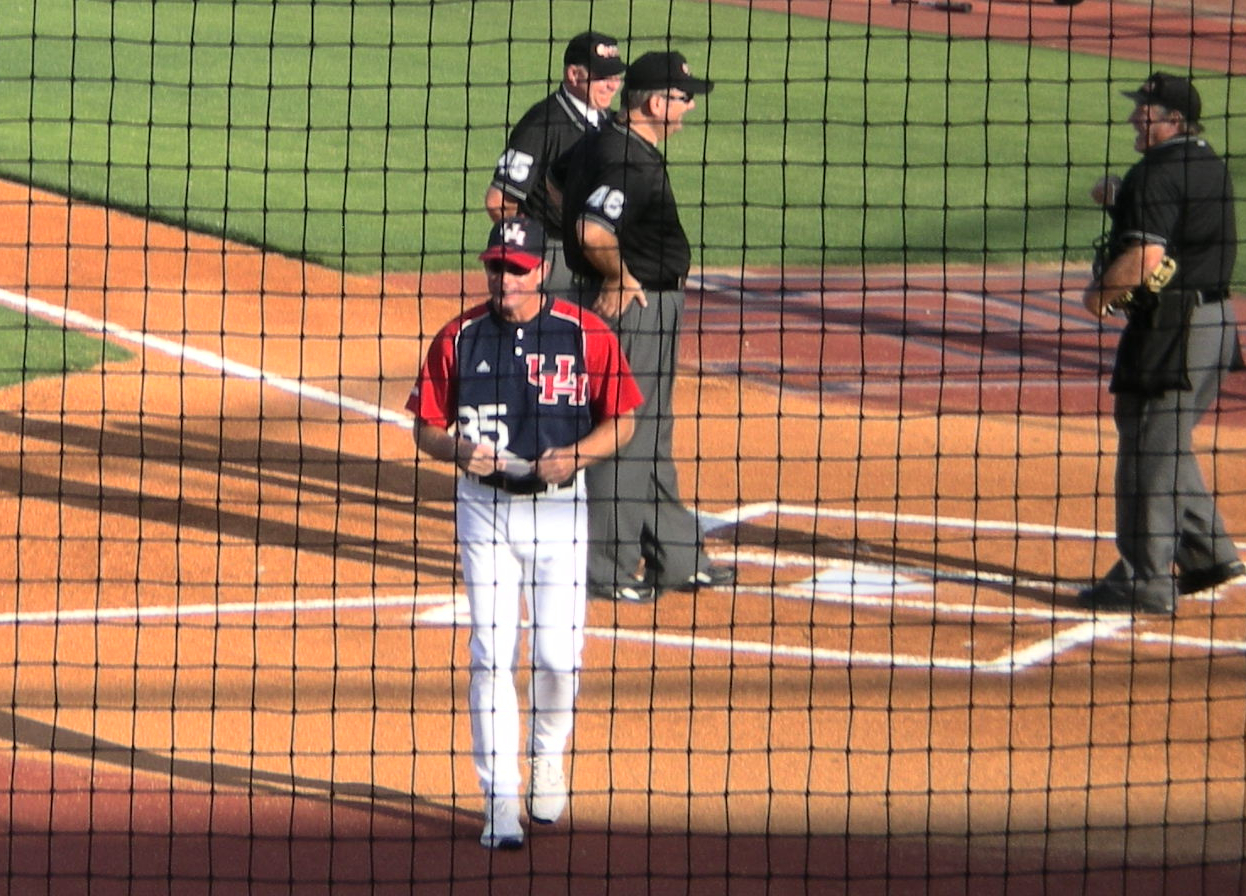
1983 All-Americans included four-time MLB All-Star Rafael Palmeiro (left) and future Houston Cougars baseball head coach Rayner Noble (right).

This is a list of college baseball players named first team All-Americans for the 1983 NCAA Division I baseball season. From 1981 to 1990, there were three generally recognized All-America selectors for baseball: the American Baseball Coaches Association, Baseball America, and The Sporting News. In order to be considered a "consensus" All-American, a player must have been selected by at least two of these.

== Key ==
A	American Baseball Coaches Association
B	Baseball America
S	The Sporting News
	Member of the National College Baseball Hall of Fame
	Consensus All-American – selected by all three organizations
	Consensus All-American – selected by two organizations

== All-Americans ==
Position	Name	School	#	A	B	S	Other awards and honors
Pitcher	Tim Belcher	Mount Vernon Nazarene	1	—	—	✓	First overall pick in the 1983 MLB draft
Pitcher	Mike Cherry	The Citadel	2	✓	✓	—	
Pitcher	Ray Hayward	Oklahoma	1	—	—	✓	
Pitcher	Jim Hickey	Texas–Pan American	2	✓	✓	—	
Pitcher	Dennis Livingston	Oklahoma State	1	—	✓	—	
Pitcher	Calvin Schiraldi	Texas	2	✓	✓	—	Baseball America Pitcher of the Year College World Series Most Outstanding Player
Catcher	Andy Allanson	Richmond	1	✓	—	—	
Catcher	Terry Bell	Old Dominion	1	—	✓	—	
Catcher	Robbie Wine	Oklahoma State	1	—	—	✓	The Sporting News Player of the Year
First baseman / DH	Dave Magadan	Alabama	3	✓	✓	✓	Golden Spikes Award Baseball America Player of the Year
First baseman / DH	Russ Morman	Wichita State	2	—	✓	✓	
Second baseman	Rich Amaral	UCLA	1	—	—	✓	
Second baseman	Jeff Trout	Delaware	2	✓	✓	—	
Shortstop	Jeff Kunkel	Rider	2	—	✓	✓	
Shortstop	Bill Merrifield	Wake Forest	1	✓	—	—	
Third baseman	Carey Ross	Central Michigan	1	✓	—	—	
Third baseman	Chris Sabo	Michigan	2	—	✓	✓	
Outfielder	Ben Abner	Georgia Southern	2	✓	✓	—	
Outfielder	Dave Clark	Jackson State	1	—	—	✓	
Outfielder	Kerwin Danley	San Diego State	1	✓	—	—	
Outfielder	Stan Jefferson	Bethune–Cookman	1	—	—	✓	
Outfielder	Shane Mack	UCLA	2	✓	✓	—	
Outfielder	Oddibe McDowell	Arizona State	1	—	—	✓	
Outfielder	Rafael Palmeiro	Mississippi State	1	—	✓	—	Baseball America Freshman of the Year
Designated hitter	Eric Hardgrave	Stanford	1	✓	—	—	
Utility player	Rayner Noble	Houston	1	✓	—	—	

== See also ==
- List of college baseball awards
