= 1983 NCAA Division I baseball season =

Baseball season

- Number of teams: 253

NCAA tournament

College World Series
- Champions: Texas (4th title)
- Runners-up: Alabama (2nd CWS Appearance)
- Winning coach: Cliff Gustafson (2nd title)
- MOP: Calvin Schiraldi (Texas)

Seasons
- ← 1982 1984 →

The 1983 NCAA Division I baseball season, play of college baseball in the United States organized by the National Collegiate Athletic Association (NCAA) began in the spring of 1983. The season progressed through the regular season and concluded with the 1983 College World Series. The College World Series, held for the thirty seventh time in 1983, consisted of one team from each of eight regional competitions and was held in Omaha, Nebraska at Johnny Rosenblatt Stadium as a double-elimination tournament. Texas claimed the championship for the fourth time.

== Realignment and format changes ==
- Nicholls State and Samford joined the Trans America Athletic Conference after transitioning to NCAA Division I, while Northeast Louisiana departed for the Southland Conference. The league dissolved its two divisions.
- Chattanooga discontinued its baseball program after the 1982 season.

== Conference winners ==
This is a partial list of conference champions from the 1983 season. The NCAA sponsored regional competitions to determine the College World Series participants. Six regionals of four teams and two of six each competed in double-elimination tournaments, with the winners advancing to Omaha. 24 teams earned automatic bids by winning their conference championship while 12 teams earned at-large selections.

Conference	Regular season winner	Conference tournament	Tournament venue • city	Tournament winner
Atlantic Coast Conference	North Carolina	1983 Atlantic Coast Conference baseball tournament	Boshamer Stadium • Chapel Hill, NC	North Carolina
Atlantic 10 Conference	East - Temple; West - Penn State	1983 Atlantic 10 Conference Baseball Championship Series	Beaver Field • State College, PA	Temple
Big Eight Conference	Oklahoma State	1983 Big Eight Conference baseball tournament	All Sports Stadium • Oklahoma City, OK	Oklahoma State
Big Ten Conference	East - Michigan; West - Minnesota	1983 Big Ten Conference baseball tournament	Ray Fisher Stadium • Ann Arbor, MI	Michigan
EIBL	Harvard	No tournament		
Mid-American Conference	East - Ohio; West - Western Michigan	1983 Mid-American Conference baseball tournament	Hyames Field • Kalamazoo, MI	Miami (OH)
Midwestern City Conference	North - Detroit; South - Oral Roberts	1983 Midwestern City Conference baseball tournament	Tulsa, OK	Oral Roberts
Pacific-10 Conference	North - Oregon State; South - Stanford	No tournament		
Southeastern Conference	East - Florida; West - Mississippi State	1983 Southeastern Conference baseball tournament	Dudy Noble Field • Starkville, MS	Alabama
Southern Conference	The Citadel	No tournament		
Southwest Conference	Texas	1983 Southwest Conference baseball tournament	Disch–Falk Field • Austin, TX	Texas
Trans America Athletic Conference	None (Note: No records for conferences games in 1983 exist, although TAAC played a conference tournament)	1983 Trans America Athletic Conference baseball tournament	Centenary Park/SPAR Stadium • Shreveport, LA	Mercer

== Conference standings ==
The following is an incomplete list of conference standings:

1983 Atlantic Coast Conference baseball standings
	Conf.				Overall
Team	W		L	PCT	W		L	PCT
No. 25 North Carolina ‍†‍‡‍^{y}	10	–	2	.833	42	–	10	.808
NC State ‍‍‍	9	–	4	.692	23	–	13	.639
Clemson ‍‍‍	6	–	5	.545	30	–	20	.600
Wake Forest ‍‍‍	5	–	6	.455	17	–	18	.486
Georgia Tech ‍‍‍	6	–	8	.429	38	–	15	.717
Maryland ‍‍‍	4	–	6	.400	14	–	19	.424
Virginia ‍‍‍	4	–	6	.400	12	–	25	.324
Duke ‍‍‍	1	–	8	.111	14	–	12	.538
† – Conference champion ‡ – Tournament champion y – Invited to the NCAA tournament As of June 30, 1983; Rankings from Collegiate Baseball

1983 Atlantic 10 Conference baseball standings
	Conf.				Overall
Team	W		L	PCT	W		L	PCT
East
Temple ^{x}‍‍‡‍^{y}	9	–	1	.900	27	–	8	.771
Rutgers ‍‍‍	5	–	7	.417	13	–	22	.371
Saint Joseph's ‍‍‍	5	–	7	.417	19	–	12	.613
Rhode Island ‍‍‍	3	–	7	.300	15	–	22	.405
West
Penn State ^{x}‍‍‍	9	–	1	.900	16	–	23	.410
West Virginia ‍‍‍	6	–	4	.600	22	–	10	.688
George Washington ‍‍‍	5	–	6	.455	7	–	25	.219
Duquesne ‍‍‍	1	–	10	.091	9	–	12	.429
x – Division champion ‡ – Championship Series champion y – Invited to the NCAA tournament As of June 30, 1983; Rankings from Collegiate Baseball

1983 Big Eight Conference baseball standings
	Conf.				Overall
Team	W		L	PCT	W		L	PCT
No. 5 Oklahoma State ‍†‍‡‍^{y}	11	–	3	.786	48	–	16	.750
No. 26 Oklahoma ‍‍‍	18	–	6	.750	39	–	20	.661
Kansas ‍‍‍	8	–	7	.533	17	–	17	.500
Missouri ‍‍‍	7	–	8	.467	25	–	16	.610
Nebraska ‍‍‍	8	–	10	.444	42	–	15	.737
Iowa State ‍‍‍	5	–	9	.357	21	–	26	.447
Kansas State ‍‍‍	2	–	16	.111	18	–	25	.419
† – Conference champion ‡ – Tournament champion y – Invited to the NCAA tournament As of June 30, 1983; Rankings from Collegiate Baseball

1983 Big Ten Conference baseball standings
	Conf.						Overall
Team	W		L		T	PCT	W		L		T	PCT
East
No. 4 Michigan ^{x}‍‍‡‍^{y}	13	–	2	–	0	.867	50	–	9	–	0	.847
Michigan State ‍‍‍	8	–	6	–	0	.571	22	–	32	–	0	.407
Indiana ‍‍‍	6	–	7	–	0	.462	26	–	21	–	0	.553
Purdue ‍‍‍	5	–	11	–	0	.313	21	–	34	–	0	.382
Ohio State ‍‍‍	3	–	9	–	0	.250	24	–	21	–	0	.533
West
Minnesota ^{x}‍‍‍	12	–	2	–	0	.857	27	–	21	–	0	.563
Iowa ‍‍‍	7	–	7	–	0	.500	32	–	31	–	0	.508
Northwestern ‍‍‍	6	–	9	–	0	.400	32	–	20	–	2	.611
Illinois ‍‍‍	6	–	8	–	0	.429	23	–	24	–	2	.490
Wisconsin ‍‍‍	6	–	10	–	0	.375	22	–	17	–	0	.564
x – Division champion ‡ – Tournament champion y – Invited to the NCAA tournament As of June 30, 1983; Rankings from Collegiate Baseball

1983 Eastern College Athletic Conference baseball standings
	Conf.				Overall
Team	W		L	PCT	W		L	PCT
New England
No. 7 Maine ^{x}‍‍‡‍^{y}	11	–	1	.917	29	–	16	.644
Connecticut ‍‍‍	8	–	5	.615	18	–	14	.563
New Hampshire ‍‍‍	10	–	8	.556	16	–	11	.593
Holy Cross ‍‍‍	9	–	9	.500	11	–	16	.407
Boston College ‍‍‍	4	–	6	.400	11	–	9	.550
Vermont ‍‍‍	5	–	8	.385	8	–	13	.381
Northeastern ‍‍‍	2	–	6	.250	15	–	14	.517
Metro and South
No. 8 James Madison ‍‍‍^{y}	12	–	4	.750	37	–	13	.740
NYIT ‍‍‍^{y}		–		–	24	–	10	.706
Seton Hall ‍‍‍	20	–	5	.800	34	–	15	.694
Fordham ‍‍‍	3	–	2	.600	14	–	19	.424
Georgetown ‍‍‍	8	–	7	.533	28	–	21	.571
William & Mary ‍‍‍^{y}		–		–	24	–	16	.600
George Mason ‍‍‍	5	–	9	.357	19	–	24	.442
Canisius ‍‍‍	1	–	7	.125	12	–	11	.522
x – Division champion ‡ – Tournament champion y – Invited to the NCAA tournament As of June 30, 1983; Rankings from Collegiate Baseball

1983 Mid-American Conference baseball standings
	Conf.						Overall
Team	W		L		T	PCT	W		L		T	PCT
Eastern Division
Ohio ^{x}‍‍‍	10	–	4	–	0	.714	26	–	19	–	0	.578
Miami ‍‍‡‍^{y}	8	–	6	–	0	.571	36	–	15	–	0	.706
Bowling Green ‍‍‍	9	–	7	–	0	.563	32	–	17	–	0	.653
Kent State ‍‍‍	6	–	9	–	0	.400	44	–	16	–	0	.733
Toledo ‍‍‍	3	–	10	–	0	.231	23	–	24	–	0	.489
Western Division
Western Michigan ^{x}‍‍‍	8	–	4	–	0	.667	26	–	21	–	0	.553
Eastern Michigan ‍‍‍	5	–	4	–	1	.550	29	–	26	–	1	.527
Central Michigan ‍‍‍	5	–	6	–	0	.455	31	–	19	–	0	.620
Ball State ‍‍‍	5	–	6	–	0	.455	23	–	23	–	1	.500
Northern Illinois ‍‍‍	3	–	7	–	1	.318	23	–	23	–	1	.500
x – Division champion ‡ – Tournament champion y – Invited to the NCAA tournament As of June 30, 1983; Rankings from Collegiate Baseball

1983 Pacific-10 Conference baseball standings
	Conf.						Overall
Team	W		L		T	PCT	W		L		T	PCT
Northern
Oregon State ^{x}‍‍‍	17	–	7	–	0	.708	27	–	15	–	0	.643
Washington State ‍‍‍	16	–	8	–	0	.667	39	–	17	–	1	.693
Washington ‍‍‍	12	–	11	–	0	.522	25	–	16	–	1	.607
Portland State ‍‍‍	11	–	12	–	0	.478	32	–	18	–	0	.640
Eastern Washington ‍‍‍	11	–	13	–	0	.458	25	–	17	–	0	.595
Portland ‍‍‍	10	–	14	–	0	.417	23	–	21	–	1	.522
Gonzaga ‍‍‍	6	–	18	–	0	.250	17	–	34	–	0	.333
Southern
No. 6 Stanford ^{x}‍‍‍^{y}	20	–	10	–	0	.667	42	–	17	–	1	.708
No. 3 Arizona State ‍‍‍^{y}	17	–	13	–	0	.567	44	–	24	–	0	.647
Southern California ‍‍‍	17	–	13	–	0	.567	32	–	23	–	1	.580
Arizona ‍‍‍	14	–	15	–	0	.483	25	–	31	–	0	.446
UCLA ‍‍‍	12	–	18	–	0	.400	28	–	24	–	1	.538
California ‍‍‍	9	–	20	–	0	.310	23	–	37	–	0	.383
x – Division champion y – Invited to the NCAA tournament As of June 30, 1983; Rankings from Collegiate Baseball

1983 Southeastern Conference baseball standings
	Conf.				Overall
Team	W		L	PCT	W		L	PCT
Eastern Division
Florida ^{x}‍‍‍	14	–	7	.667	38	–	14	.731
Tennessee ‍‍‍	12	–	7	.632	26	–	16	.619
Georgia ‍‍‍	11	–	9	.550	29	–	19	.604
Kentucky ‍‍‍	6	–	11	.353	31	–	14	.689
Vanderbilt ‍‍‍	6	–	15	.286	22	–	23	.489
Western Division
No. 12 Mississippi State ^{x}‍‍‍^{y}	17	–	5	.773	42	–	15	.737
No. 2 Alabama ‍‍‡‍^{y}	14	–	7	.667	46	–	11	.807
Ole Miss ‍‍‍	10	–	12	.455	26	–	18	.591
LSU ‍‍‍	9	–	12	.429	28	–	21	.571
Auburn ‍‍‍	4	–	18	.182	16	–	34	.320
x – Division champion ‡ – Tournament champion y – Invited to the NCAA tournament As of June 30, 1983; Rankings from Collegiate Baseball

1983 Southern Conference baseball standings
	Conf.				Overall
Team	W		L	PCT	W		L	PCT
No. 21 The Citadel ‍†‍‍^{y}	12	–	2	.857	34	–	10	.773
East Tennessee State ‍‍‍	9	–	3	.750	20	–	18	.526
Western Carolina ‍‍‍	9	–	5	.643	25	–	20	.556
Appalachian State ‍‍‍	7	–	7	.500	33	–	14	.702
Marshall ‍‍‍	7	–	7	.500	19	–	14	.576
VMI ‍‍‍	5	–	9	.357	11	–	25	.306
Davidson ‍‍‍	3	–	11	.214	11	–	24	.314
Furman ‍‍‍	2	–	10	.167	4	–	22	.154
y – Invited to the NCAA tournament As of June 30, 1983; Rankings from Collegiate Baseball

1983 Southwest Conference baseball standings
	Conf.				Overall
Team	W		L	PCT	W		L	PCT
No. 1 Texas ‍†‍‡‍^{y}	18	–	3	.857	66	–	14	.825
No. 24 Arkansas ‍‍‍^{y}	13	–	8	.619	44	–	21	.677
Houston ‍‍‍	13	–	8	.619	43	–	15	.741
Baylor ‍‍‍	8	–	7	.533	20	–	9	.690
Rice ‍‍‍	2	–	11	.154	9	–	12	.429
Texas Tech ‍‍‍	8	–	13	.381	18	–	23	.439
TCU ‍‍‍	6	–	15	.286	26	–	25	.510
Texas A&M ‍‍‍	4	–	17	.190	24	–	21	.533
† – Conference champion ‡ – Tournament champion y – Invited to the NCAA tournament As of June 30, 1983; Rankings from Collegiate Baseball

1983 Trans America Athletic Conference baseball standings
	Conf.						Overall
Team	W		L		T	PCT	W		L		T	PCT
Georgia Southern ‍‍‍	0	–	0	–	0	–	38	–	24	–	0	.613
Nicholls State ‍‍‍	0	–	0	–	0	–	38	–	24	–	0	.613
Arkansas–Little Rock ‍‍‍	0	–	0	–	0	–	23	–	20	–	1	.534
Mercer ‍‍‡‍	0	–	0	–	0	–	29	–	26	–	1	.527
Northwestern State ‍‍‍	0	–	0	–	0	–	26	–	30	–	0	.464
Centenary ‍‍‍	0	–	0	–	0	–	18	–	22	–	0	.450
Hardin–Simmons ‍‍‍	0	–	0	–	0	–	22	–	27	–	0	.449
Samford ‍‍‍	0	–	0	–	0	–	4	–	37	–	0	.098
‡ – Tournament champion y – Invited to the NCAA tournament As of June 30, 1983; Rankings from Collegiate Baseball

== College World Series ==
The 1983 season marked the thirty seventh NCAA baseball tournament, which culminated with the eight team College World Series. The College World Series was held in Omaha, Nebraska. The eight teams played a double-elimination format, with Texas claiming their fourth championship with a 4–3 win over Alabama in the final.

Upper round 1
Texas	12
James Madison	0
Oklahoma State	3
Stanford	1
Michigan	6
Maine	5
Alabama	6^{11}
Arizona State	5

Upper round 2
Texas	6^{11}
Oklahoma State	5
Michigan	5
Alabama	6
Lower round 1
James Madison	1
Stanford	3
Maine	0
Arizona State	7

Upper final
Texas	6^{10}
Alabama	4
Lower round 2
Michigan	11
Stanford	4
Oklahoma State	5
Arizona State	6

Semifinals
Texas	4
Michigan	2
Alabama	6
Arizona State	0

Final
Texas	4
Alabama	3
