= 1983 Atlantic 10 Conference baseball championship series =

American college baseball tournament

1983 Atlantic 10 Conference baseball tournament
- Teams: 2
- Format: Best of 3 series
- Finals site: Beaver Field; State College, PA
- Champions: Temple (1st title)
- Winning coach: Skip Wilson (1st title)

1983 Atlantic 10 Conference baseball standings
| | Conf. | | | | Overall |
| Team | W | | L | PCT | W | | L | PCT |
|---|---|---|---|---|---|---|---|---|
East
| Temple ^{x}‍‍‡‍^{y} | 9 | – | 1 | .900 | 27 | – | 8 | .771 |
| Rutgers ‍‍‍ | 5 | – | 7 | .417 | 13 | – | 22 | .371 |
| Saint Joseph's ‍‍‍ | 5 | – | 7 | .417 | 19 | – | 12 | .613 |
| Rhode Island ‍‍‍ | 3 | – | 7 | .300 | 15 | – | 22 | .405 |
West
| Penn State ^{x}‍‍‍ | 9 | – | 1 | .900 | 16 | – | 23 | .410 |
| West Virginia ‍‍‍ | 6 | – | 4 | .600 | 22 | – | 10 | .688 |
| George Washington ‍‍‍ | 5 | – | 6 | .455 | 7 | – | 25 | .219 |
| Duquesne ‍‍‍ | 1 | – | 10 | .091 | 9 | – | 12 | .429 |
x – Division champion ‡ – Championship Series champion y – Invited to the NCAA tournament As of June 30, 1983; Rankings from Collegiate Baseball

The 1983 Atlantic Conference Baseball Championship Series was held on May 6 and 7, 1983 to determine the champion of the NCAA Division I the Atlantic 10 Conference, for the 1983 NCAA Division I baseball season. The conference rechristened itself for the 1983 season, recognizing membership changes. This was the fifth iteration of the event, and was held at Beaver Field on the campus of Penn State in State College, Pennsylvania. Temple won the championship two games to none and earned the conference's automatic bid to the 1983 NCAA Division I baseball tournament.

== Format and seeding ==
The regular season winners of each of the conference's two divisions advanced to a best of three series.

| Team | W | L | Pct | GB |
|---|---|---|---|---|
East Division
| Temple | 9 | 1 | .900 | — |
| Rutgers | 5 | 7 | .417 | 5 |
| Saint Joseph's | 5 | 7 | .417 | 5 |
| Rhode Island | 3 | 7 | .300 | 6 |

| Team | W | L | Pct | GB |
|---|---|---|---|---|
Western Division
| Penn State | 9 | 1 | .900 | — |
| West Virginia | 6 | 4 | .600 | 3 |
| George Washington | 5 | 6 | .455 | 4.5 |
| Duquesne | 1 | 10 | .091 | 8.5 |

== Results ==
Game One

May 6, 1983
| Team | R |
|---|---|
| Temple | 10 |
| Penn State | 7 |

Game Two

May 7, 1983
| Team | R |
|---|---|
| Penn State | 1 |
| Temple | 6 |
