= 1983 Arizona Wildcats baseball team =

American college baseball season

1983 Arizona Wildcats baseball
- Conference: Pacific-10 Conference
- Record: 25–31 (14–15 Pac-10)
- Head coach: Jerry Kindall (11th season)
- Assistant coaches: Jerry Stitt (5th season); Jim Wing (11th season)
- Home stadium: Wildcat Field

1983 Pacific-10 Conference baseball standings
	Conf.						Overall
Team	W		L		T	PCT	W		L		T	PCT
Northern
Oregon State ^{x}‍‍‍	17	–	7	–	0	.708	27	–	15	–	0	.643
Washington State ‍‍‍	16	–	8	–	0	.667	39	–	17	–	1	.693
Washington ‍‍‍	12	–	11	–	0	.522	25	–	16	–	1	.607
Portland State ‍‍‍	11	–	12	–	0	.478	32	–	18	–	0	.640
Eastern Washington ‍‍‍	11	–	13	–	0	.458	25	–	17	–	0	.595
Portland ‍‍‍	10	–	14	–	0	.417	23	–	21	–	1	.522
Gonzaga ‍‍‍	6	–	18	–	0	.250	17	–	34	–	0	.333
Southern
No. 6 Stanford ^{x}‍‍‍^{y}	20	–	10	–	0	.667	42	–	17	–	1	.708
No. 3 Arizona State ‍‍‍^{y}	17	–	13	–	0	.567	44	–	24	–	0	.647
Southern California ‍‍‍	17	–	13	–	0	.567	32	–	23	–	1	.580
Arizona ‍‍‍	14	–	15	–	0	.483	25	–	31	–	0	.446
UCLA ‍‍‍	12	–	18	–	0	.400	28	–	24	–	1	.538
California ‍‍‍	9	–	20	–	0	.310	23	–	37	–	0	.383
x – Division champion y – Invited to the NCAA tournament As of June 30, 1983; Rankings from Collegiate Baseball

The 1983 Arizona Wildcats baseball team represented the University of Arizona during the 1983 NCAA Division I baseball season. The Wildcats played their home games at Wildcat Field. The team was coached by Jerry Kindall in his 11th season at Arizona. The Wildcats finished 25–31 overall and placed 4th in the Pacific-10's Southern Division with an 14–15 record. Arizona missed the postseason for the 3rd straight season, tying at the time the longest postseason drought in program history, set on 3 occasions (1947–1949, 1967–1969, 1971–1973).

== Previous season ==
The Wildcats finished the 1982 season with a record of 32–21–1 and 15–13–1 in conference play, finishing 3rd in the "Six-Pac" (Pac-10 Southern). Despite being above .500 both overall and in conference play, the Wildcats did not receive a bid to the postseason. This marked the 1st time that the program missed back-to-back postseasons since 1972–1973.

== Personnel ==
=== Roster ===
1983 Arizona Wildcats baseball roster
• Marcel Bachelier • Richard Beatty • John Beuerlein • Brian Billard • Wayne Bonham • Kerry Burns • David Cooper • Dan Devers	• Alan Haugen • Randal Hayes • Murray Hicks • Darrell Higgs • Jack Howell • Dave Landrith • Lance Lincoln	• Joe Magrane • Michael Ollom • Bobby Ralston • Doug Scherer • Cory Sylvester • Ed Vosberg • Kevin Ward • Thomas Weiser

=== Coaches ===
1983 Arizona Wildcats baseball coaching staff
- Jerry Kindall – Head coach
- Jerry Stitt – Assistant coach
- Jim Wing – Assistant coach

== 1983 Schedule and results ==
1983 Arizona Wildcats baseball game log
Regular season
Date	Opponent	Site/Stadium	Score	Overall Record	Pac-10 Record
Jan 31	New Mexico State	Wildcat Field • Tucson, AZ	W 15–2	1–0	
Feb 1	New Mexico State	Wildcat Field • Tucson, AZ	W 11–6	2–0	
Feb 7	UC Riverside	Wildcat Field • Tucson, AZ	L 3–5	2–1	
Feb 8	UC Riverside	Wildcat Field • Tucson, AZ	W 9–5	3–1	
Feb 10	Cal State Fullerton	Wildcat Field • Tucson, AZ	W 19–11	4–1	
Feb 11	Cal State Fullerton	Wildcat Field • Tucson, AZ	L 5–8	4–2	
Feb 12	Cal State Fullerton	Wildcat Field • Tucson, AZ	L 2–5	4–3	
Feb 15	UC Santa Barbara	Wildcat Field • Tucson, AZ	W 9–2	5–3	
Feb 17	UC Santa Barbara	Wildcat Field • Tucson, AZ	L 11–16	5–4	
Feb 18	San Diego State	Wildcat Field • Tucson, AZ	L 10–11	5–5	
Feb 19	San Diego State	Wildcat Field • Tucson, AZ	W 15–8	6–5	
Feb 19	San Diego State	Wildcat Field • Tucson, AZ	L 12–13	6–6	
Feb 21	UTEP	Wildcat Field • Tucson, AZ	W 6–4	7–6	
Feb 22	UTEP	Wildcat Field • Tucson, AZ	W 14–0	8–6	
Feb 24	at Hawaii	UH Stadium • Honolulu, HI	L 7–9	8–7	
Feb 25	at Hawaii	UH Stadium • Honolulu, HI	L 1–3	8–8	
Feb 25	at Hawaii	UH Stadium • Honolulu, HI	L 10–14	8–9	
Feb 26	at Hawaii	UH Stadium • Honolulu, HI	L 5–13	8–10	
Mar 4	Stanford	Wildcat Field • Tucson, AZ	W 4–3	9–10	1–0
Mar 5	Stanford	Wildcat Field • Tucson, AZ	L 9–10	9–11	1–1
Mar 6	Stanford	Wildcat Field • Tucson, AZ	L 6–15	9–12	1–2
Mar 11	at Cal State Fullerton	Titan Field • Fullerton, CA	L 3–4	9–13	
Mar 12	at Cal State Fullerton	Titan Field • Fullerton, CA	L 6–7	9–14	
Mar 13	at Cal State Fullerton	Titan Field • Fullerton, CA	L 3–7	9–15	
Mar 15	at UC Santa Barbara	Campus Stadium • Santa Barbara, CA	L 3–6	9–16	
Mar 16	at UC Santa Barbara	Campus Stadium • Santa Barbara, CA	W 8–1	10–16	
Mar 22	Chapman	Wildcat Field • Tucson, AZ	L 3–7	10–17	
Mar 23	Chapman	Wildcat Field • Tucson, AZ	W 7–5	11–17	
Mar 26	USC	Wildcat Field • Tucson, AZ	W 11–1	12–17	2–2
Mar 26	USC	Wildcat Field • Tucson, AZ	L 3–4	12–18	2–3
Mar 27	USC	Wildcat Field • Tucson, AZ	L 3–9	12–19	2–4
Apr 1	at UCLA	Jackie Robinson Stadium • Los Angeles, CA	W 8–6	13–19	3–4
Apr 2	at UCLA	Jackie Robinson Stadium • Los Angeles, CA	L 3–4	13–20	3–5
Apr 3	at UCLA	Jackie Robinson Stadium • Los Angeles, CA	W 3–2	14–20	4–5
Apr 7	Arizona State	Wildcat Field • Tucson, AZ	W 4–3	15–20	5–5
Apr 8	Arizona State	Wildcat Field • Tucson, AZ	L 7–14	15–21	5–6
Apr 9	Arizona State	Wildcat Field • Tucson, AZ	L 2–3	15–22	5–7
Apr 12	at Grand Canyon	Brazell Field • Phoenix, AZ	L 4–12	15–23	
Apr 14	California	Wildcat Field • Tucson, AZ	W 9–3	16–23	6–7
Apr 14	California	Wildcat Field • Tucson, AZ	L 5–6	16–24	6–8
Apr 15	California	Wildcat Field • Tucson, AZ	W 11–8	17–24	7–8
Apr 16	California	Wildcat Field • Tucson, AZ	L 5–8	17–25	7–9
Apr 17	California	Wildcat Field • Tucson, AZ	W 6–3	18–25	8–9
Apr 19	Grand Canyon	Wildcat Field • Tucson, AZ	W 13–12	19–25	
Apr 22	at USC	Dedeaux Field • Los Angeles, CA	W 2–1	20–25	9–9
Apr 23	at USC	Dedeaux Field • Los Angeles, CA	L 2–3	20–26	9–10
Apr 24	at USC	Dedeaux Field • Los Angeles, CA	L 0–4	20–27	9–11
May 1	at Stanford	Sunken Diamond • Palo Alto, CA	W 4–2	21–27	10–11
May 2	at Stanford	Sunken Diamond • Palo Alto, CA	W 3–1	22–27	11–11
May 3	at Stanford	Sunken Diamond • Palo Alto, CA	L 3–5	22–28	11–12
May 6	UCLA	Wildcat Field • Tucson, AZ	L 14–16	22–29	11–13
May 7	UCLA	Wildcat Field • Tucson, AZ	L 0–20	22–30	11–14
May 8	UCLA	Wildcat Field • Tucson, AZ	W 6–5	23–30	12–14
May 11	at Arizona State	Packard Stadium • Tempe, AZ	L 5–9	23–31	12–15
May 12	at Arizona State	Packard Stadium • Tempe, AZ	W 5–2	24–31	13–15
May 13	at Arizona State	Packard Stadium • Tempe, AZ	W 5–3	25–31	14–15

== 1983 MLB draft ==
Player	Position	Round	Overall	MLB team
Ed Vosberg	LHP	3	64	San Diego Padres
Kevin Ward	OF	6	154	Philadelphia Phillies
Dave Landrith	C	12	309	Kansas City Royals
Doug Scherer	RHP	13	319	Oakland Athletics
Bobby Ralston	INF	17	434	San Francisco Giants
John Beuerlein	C	25	637	Milwaukee Brewers
Doyle Bonham	OF	28	696	San Francisco Giants
