= 1983 Southwest Conference baseball tournament =

- Teams: 4
- Format: Double-elimination tournament
- Finals site: Disch–Falk Field; Austin, Texas
- Champions: Texas (5th title)
- Winning coach: Cliff Gustafson (5th title)

1983 Southwest Conference baseball standings
	Conf.				Overall
Team	W		L	PCT	W		L	PCT
No. 1 Texas ‍†‍‡‍^{y}	18	–	3	.857	66	–	14	.825
No. 24 Arkansas ‍‍‍^{y}	13	–	8	.619	44	–	21	.677
Houston ‍‍‍	13	–	8	.619	43	–	15	.741
Baylor ‍‍‍	8	–	7	.533	20	–	9	.690
Rice ‍‍‍	2	–	11	.154	9	–	12	.429
Texas Tech ‍‍‍	8	–	13	.381	18	–	23	.439
TCU ‍‍‍	6	–	15	.286	26	–	25	.510
Texas A&M ‍‍‍	4	–	17	.190	24	–	21	.533
† – Conference champion ‡ – Tournament champion y – Invited to the NCAA tournament As of June 30, 1983; Rankings from Collegiate Baseball

The 1983 Southwest Conference baseball tournament was the league's annual postseason tournament used to determine the Southwest Conference's (SWC) automatic bid to the 1983 NCAA Division I baseball tournament. The tournament was held from May 13 through 16 at Disch–Falk Field on the campus of the University of Texas in Austin, Texas.

The number 1 seed Texas Longhorns went 3–1 to win the team's fifth SWC tournament under head coach Cliff Gustafson.

== Format and seeding ==
The tournament featured the top four finishers of the SWC's eight teams in a double-elimination tournament.

Place	Team	Conference				Overall			Seed
Place	Team	W	L	%	GB	W	L	%	Seed
1	Texas	18	3	.857	-	66	14	.825	1
2	Arkansas	13	8	.619	5	44	21	.677	2
3	Houston	13	8	.619	5	43	15	.741	3
4	Rice	11	10	.524	7	36	16	.692	4
5	Baylor	11	0	1.000	2	26	22	.542	-
6	Texas Tech	8	13	.381	10	18	23	.439	-
7	TCU	6	15	.286	12	26	25	.510	-
8	Texas A&M	4	17	.190	14	24	21	.533	-

== Tournament ==
Upper round 1
1	Texas	4
4	Rice	3
2	Arkansas	4
3	Houston	3
Lower round 1
4	Rice	2
3	Houston	4

Upper final
1	Texas	9
2	Arkansas	2
Lower final
2	Arkansas	9
3	Houston	7

Final
1	Texas	4	14
2	Arkansas	5	0
