= 1983 Big Ten baseball tournament =

1983 Big Ten Conference baseball tournament
- Teams: 4
- Format: Double-elimination
- Finals site: Ray Fisher Stadium; Ann Arbor, MI
- Champions: Michigan (2nd title)
- Winning coach: Bud Middaugh (2nd title)
- MVP: Barry Larkin (Michigan)

1983 Big Ten Conference baseball standings
	Conf.						Overall
Team	W		L		T	PCT	W		L		T	PCT
East
No. 4 Michigan ^{x}‍‍‡‍^{y}	13	–	2	–	0	.867	50	–	9	–	0	.847
Michigan State ‍‍‍	8	–	6	–	0	.571	22	–	32	–	0	.407
Indiana ‍‍‍	6	–	7	–	0	.462	26	–	21	–	0	.553
Purdue ‍‍‍	5	–	11	–	0	.313	21	–	34	–	0	.382
Ohio State ‍‍‍	3	–	9	–	0	.250	24	–	21	–	0	.533
West
Minnesota ^{x}‍‍‍	12	–	2	–	0	.857	27	–	21	–	0	.563
Iowa ‍‍‍	7	–	7	–	0	.500	32	–	31	–	0	.508
Northwestern ‍‍‍	6	–	9	–	0	.400	32	–	20	–	2	.611
Illinois ‍‍‍	6	–	8	–	0	.429	23	–	24	–	2	.490
Wisconsin ‍‍‍	6	–	10	–	0	.375	22	–	17	–	0	.564
x – Division champion ‡ – Tournament champion y – Invited to the NCAA tournament As of June 30, 1983; Rankings from Collegiate Baseball

The 1983 Big Ten Conference baseball tournament was held at Ray Fisher Stadium on the campus of the University of Michigan in Ann Arbor, Michigan, from May 20 through 22. The top two teams from the regular season in each division participated in the double-elimination tournament, the third annual tournament sponsored by the Big Ten Conference to determine the league champion. Michigan won their second tournament championship and earned the Big Ten Conference's automatic bid to the 1983 NCAA Division I baseball tournament

== Format and seeding ==
The 1983 tournament was a 4-team double-elimination tournament, with seeds determined by conference regular season winning percentage within each division. The top seed from each division played the second seed from the opposite division in the first round.

Team	W	L	PCT	GB	Seed
East Division
Michigan	13	2	.867	–	1E
Michigan State	8	6	.571	4.5	2E
Indiana	6	7	.462	6	–
Purdue	5	11	.313	8.5	–
Ohio State	3	9	.250	8.5	–
West Division
Minnesota	12	2	.857	–	1W
Iowa	7	7	.500	5	2W
Northwestern	6	9	.400	6.5	–
Illinois	6	9	.400	6.5	–
Wisconsin	6	10	.375	7	–

== Tournament ==
Upper round 1
1E	Michigan	1
2W	Iowa	0
1W	Minnesota	14
2E	Michigan State	1
Lower round 1
2W	Iowa	6
2E	Michigan State	2

Upper final
1E	Michigan	10
1W	Minnesota	9
Lower final
1W	Minnesota	0
2W	Iowa	2

Final
1E	Michigan	12
2W	Iowa	3

== All-Tournament Team ==
The following players were named to the All-Tournament Team.

Pos	Name	School
P	Paul Rieks	Iowa
P	Rich Stoll	Michigan
1B	Ken Hayward	Michigan
2B	Jeff Jacobson	Michigan
SS	Barry Larkin	Michigan
OF	Craig Conti	Iowa
OF	Tim Snowberger	Iowa
OF	Dale Sklar	Michigan
OF	Terry Steinbach	Minnesota
DH	Chuck Froning	Michigan

=== Most Outstanding Player ===
Barry Larkin was named Most Outstanding Player. Larkin was a shortstop for Michigan.
