= 1983 Mid-American Conference baseball tournament =

American collegiate baseball tournament

- Teams: 4
- Format: Double-elimination
- Finals site: Hyames Field; Kalamazoo, MI
- Champions: Miami (1st title)
- Winning coach: John Pavlisko (1st title)

1983 Mid-American Conference baseball standings
	Conf.						Overall
Team	W		L		T	PCT	W		L		T	PCT
Eastern Division
Ohio ^{x}‍‍‍	10	–	4	–	0	.714	26	–	19	–	0	.578
Miami ‍‍‡‍^{y}	8	–	6	–	0	.571	36	–	15	–	0	.706
Bowling Green ‍‍‍	9	–	7	–	0	.563	32	–	17	–	0	.653
Kent State ‍‍‍	6	–	9	–	0	.400	44	–	16	–	0	.733
Toledo ‍‍‍	3	–	10	–	0	.231	23	–	24	–	0	.489
Western Division
Western Michigan ^{x}‍‍‍	8	–	4	–	0	.667	26	–	21	–	0	.553
Eastern Michigan ‍‍‍	5	–	4	–	1	.550	29	–	26	–	1	.527
Central Michigan ‍‍‍	5	–	6	–	0	.455	31	–	19	–	0	.620
Ball State ‍‍‍	5	–	6	–	0	.455	23	–	23	–	1	.500
Northern Illinois ‍‍‍	3	–	7	–	1	.318	23	–	23	–	1	.500
x – Division champion ‡ – Tournament champion y – Invited to the NCAA tournament As of June 30, 1983; Rankings from Collegiate Baseball

The 1983 Mid-American Conference baseball tournament took place from May 19 through 21. The top two regular-season finishers from each division met in the double-elimination tournament held at Hyames Field in Kalamazoo, Michigan. This was the third Mid-American Conference postseason tournament to determine a champion. Fourth seeded Miami won their first tournament championship to earn the conference's automatic bid to the 1983 NCAA Division I baseball tournament.

== Seeding and format ==
The top two finishers from each division, based on conference winning percentage only, participated in the tournament. The top seed from each division played the second seed from the other division in the double-elimination tournament.

Team	W	L	T	PCT	GB	Seed
Eastern Division
Ohio	10	4	0	.714	–	1E
Miami	8	6	0	.571	2	2E
Bowling Green	9	7	0	.563	2	–
Kent State	6	9	0	.400	4.5	–
Toledo	3	10	0	.231	6.5	–
Western Division
Western Michigan	8	4	0	.667	–	1W
Eastern Michigan	5	4	1	.550	2	2W
Central Michigan	5	6	0	.455	2.5	–
Ball State	5	6	0	.455	2.5	–
Northern Illinois	3	7	1	.318	4.5	–

== Results ==
Upper round 1
1E	Ohio	10
2W	Eastern Michigan	9
1W	Western Michigan	1
2E	Miami	8
Lower round 1
2W	Eastern Michigan	7
1W	Western Michigan	4

Upper final
1E	Ohio	3
2E	Miami	10
Lower final
1E	Ohio	3
2W	Eastern Michigan	12

Final
2	Miami	7	—
2W	Eastern Michigan	3	—
