= 1983 Southeastern Conference baseball tournament =

- Teams: 4
- Format: Four-team double elimination tournament
- Finals site: Dudy Noble Field; Starkville, Mississippi
- Champions: Alabama (1st title)
- Winning coach: Barry Shollenberger (1st title)
- MVP: Dave Magadan (Alabama)

1983 Southeastern Conference baseball standings
| | Conf. | | | | Overall |
| Team | W | | L | PCT | W | | L | PCT |
|---|---|---|---|---|---|---|---|---|
Eastern Division
| Florida ^{x}‍‍‍ | 14 | – | 7 | .667 | 38 | – | 14 | .731 |
| Tennessee ‍‍‍ | 12 | – | 7 | .632 | 26 | – | 16 | .619 |
| Georgia ‍‍‍ | 11 | – | 9 | .550 | 29 | – | 19 | .604 |
| Kentucky ‍‍‍ | 6 | – | 11 | .353 | 31 | – | 14 | .689 |
| Vanderbilt ‍‍‍ | 6 | – | 15 | .286 | 22 | – | 23 | .489 |
Western Division
| No. 12 Mississippi State ^{x}‍‍‍^{y} | 17 | – | 5 | .773 | 42 | – | 15 | .737 |
| No. 2 Alabama ‍‍‡‍^{y} | 14 | – | 7 | .667 | 46 | – | 11 | .807 |
| Ole Miss ‍‍‍ | 10 | – | 12 | .455 | 26 | – | 18 | .591 |
| LSU ‍‍‍ | 9 | – | 12 | .429 | 28 | – | 21 | .571 |
| Auburn ‍‍‍ | 4 | – | 18 | .182 | 16 | – | 34 | .320 |
x – Division champion ‡ – Tournament champion y – Invited to the NCAA tournament As of June 30, 1983; Rankings from Collegiate Baseball

The 1983 Southeastern Conference baseball tournament was held at Dudy Noble Field in Starkville, Mississippi, from May 13 through 15. Alabama won the tournament and earned the Southeastern Conference's automatic bid to the 1983 NCAA tournament.

== Regular season results ==
| Team | W | L | Pct | GB | Seed |
|---|---|---|---|---|---|
Eastern Division
| Florida | 14 | 7 | .667 | — | 3 |
| Tennessee | 12 | 7 | .632 | 1 | 4 |
| Georgia | 11 | 9 | .550 | 2.5 | — |
| Kentucky | 6 | 11 | .353 | 6 | — |
| Vanderbilt | 6 | 15 | .286 | 8 | — |

| Team | W | L | Pct | GB | Seed |
|---|---|---|---|---|---|
Western Division
| Mississippi State | 17 | 5 | .773 | — | 1 |
| Alabama | 14 | 7 | .667 | 2.5 | 2 |
| Ole Miss | 10 | 12 | .455 | 7 | — |
| LSU | 9 | 12 | .429 | 7.5 | — |
| Auburn | 4 | 18 | .182 | 13 | — |

== Tournament ==
First round
2 | Alabama | 15
3 | Florida | 2
4 | Tennessee | 20
1 | Mississippi State | 11
Lower round 1
3 | Florida | 3
1 | Mississippi State | 5

Semi-finals
2 | Alabama | 8
4 | Tennessee | 6
Lower final
1 | Mississippi State | 9
4 | Tennessee | 4

Finals
2 | Alabama | 10 | –
1 | Mississippi State | 9 | –

== All-Tournament Team ==
| Position | Player | School |
|---|---|---|
| 1B | Dave Magadan | Alabama |
| 2B | Pete White | Mississippi State |
| 3B | Brett Elbin | Alabama |
| SS | Bob Parker | Mississippi State |
| C | Frank Vellaggia | Alabama |
| OF | Rafael Palmeiro | Mississippi State |
| OF | Alan Cockrell | Tennessee |
| OF | Curt Cornwell | Tennessee |
| DH | Rusty Ensor | Tennessee |
| UT | Dean Eichelberger | Tennessee |
| P | Brian Farmer | Ole Miss |
| P | Tim Meacham | Alabama |
| P | Jeff Brantley | Mississippi State |
| MVP | Dave Magadan | Alabama |

== See also ==
- College World Series
- NCAA Division I Baseball Championship
- Southeastern Conference baseball tournament
