= 1983 Texas Longhorns baseball team =

American college baseball season

1983 Texas Longhorns baseball

National champions SWC champions SWC Tournament champions
- Conference: Southwest Conference
- CB: No. 1
- Record: 66–14 (18–3 SWC)
- Head coach: Cliff Gustafson (16th year)
- Assistant coaches: Bill Bethea; Clint Thomas
- Home stadium: Disch-Falk Field

1983 Southwest Conference baseball standings
	Conf.				Overall
Team	W		L	PCT	W		L	PCT
No. 1 Texas ‍†‍‡‍^{y}	18	–	3	.857	66	–	14	.825
No. 24 Arkansas ‍‍‍^{y}	13	–	8	.619	44	–	21	.677
Houston ‍‍‍	13	–	8	.619	43	–	15	.741
Baylor ‍‍‍	8	–	7	.533	20	–	9	.690
Rice ‍‍‍	2	–	11	.154	9	–	12	.429
Texas Tech ‍‍‍	8	–	13	.381	18	–	23	.439
TCU ‍‍‍	6	–	15	.286	26	–	25	.510
Texas A&M ‍‍‍	4	–	17	.190	24	–	21	.533
† – Conference champion ‡ – Tournament champion y – Invited to the NCAA tournament As of June 30, 1983; Rankings from Collegiate Baseball

The 1983 Texas Longhorns baseball team represented the University of Texas in the 1983 NCAA Division I baseball season. The Longhorns played their home games at Disch-Falk Field. The team was coached by Cliff Gustafson in his 16th season at Texas.

The Longhorns won the College World Series, defeating the Alabama Crimson Tide in the championship game.

== Roster ==
1983 Texas Longhorns roster
Pitchers: 17 James Harris; 19 Mike Capel; 20 Wade Phillips; 21 Roger Clemens; 22 Eric Boudreaux; 23 Steve Labay; 25 Calvin Schiraldi; 29 Bruce Ruffin	Infielders: 1 Billy Bates; 2 Bryan Burrows; 3 Mike Brumley; 4 Jamie Doughty; 6 David Denny; 7 Deron Gustafson; 24 Jose Tolentino; 36 Robert Gauntt	Outfielders: 5 Johnny Sutton; 8 Mike Trent; 11 Mike Simon; 13 Bud Ray; 14 Kirk Killingsworth; 15 Doug Hodo; Catchers: 9 Alan Brown; 10 Darren Loy; 12 Jeff Hearron

== Schedule ==
1983 Texas Longhorns baseball game log
Regular season
February

Date	Opponent	Site/stadium	Score	Overall Record	Big 12 Record
February 18	Midwestern	Disch-Falk Field	12-2	1-0	–
February 18	Midwestern	Disch-Falk Field	11-3	2-0	–
February 19	Texas–Arlington	Disch-Falk Field	6-10	2-1	–
February 19	Texas–Arlington	Disch-Falk Field	7-6	3-1	–
February 20	Texas–Arlington	Disch-Falk Field	5-8	3-2	–
February 20	Texas–Arlington	Disch-Falk Field	6-0	4-2	–
February 23	Texas Lutheran	Disch-Falk Field	13-2	5-2	–
February 23	Texas Lutheran	Disch-Falk Field	2-3	5-3	–
February 26	Louisiana Tech	Disch-Falk Field	6-4	6–3	–
February 26	Louisiana Tech	Disch-Falk Field	9-4	7–3	–
February 27	Louisiana Tech	Disch-Falk Field	7-6	8–3	–

March

Date	Opponent	Site/stadium	Score	Overall Record	Big 12 Record
March 1	Oral Roberts	Disch-Falk Field	4-1	9–3	–
March 2	Oral Roberts	Disch-Falk Field	3-2	10–3	–
March 4	Cal State Fullerton	Disch-Falk Field	8-7	11–3	–
March 5	Cal State Fullerton	Disch-Falk Field	3-1	12–3	–
March 5	Cal State Fullerton	Disch-Falk Field	10-3	13–3	–
March 7	Lubbock Christian	Disch-Falk Field	2-4	13–4	–
March 7	Lubbock Christian	Disch-Falk Field	8-0	14–4	–
March 11	Dallas Baptist	Disch-Falk Field	6–0	15–4	–
March 11	Dallas Baptist	Disch-Falk Field	4–0	16–4	–
March 12	Dallas Baptist	Disch-Falk Field	9–4	17–4	–
March 12	Dallas Baptist	Disch-Falk Field	8–6	18–4	–
March 14	St. Mary's	Disch-Falk Field	1–5	18–5	–
March 14	St. Mary's	Disch-Falk Field	12–2	19–5	–
March 16	Emporia State	Disch-Falk Field	4–0	20–5	–
March 16	Emporia State	Disch-Falk Field	14–1	21–5	–
March 17	Emporia State	Disch-Falk Field	9–4	22–5	–
March 17	Emporia State	Disch-Falk Field	9–5	23–5	–
March 18	Arizona State	Disch-Falk Field	11–2	24–5	–
March 18	Arizona State	Disch-Falk Field	6–0	25–5	–
March 20	Texas Wesleyan	Disch-Falk Field	4–3	26–5	–
March 20	Texas Wesleyan	Disch-Falk Field	7–0	27–5	–
March 21	Texas Wesleyan	Disch-Falk Field	0–3	27–6	–
March 21	Texas Wesleyan	Disch-Falk Field	5–6	27–7	–
March 22	SE Oklahoma	Disch-Falk Field	14–2	28–7	–
March 22	SE Oklahoma	Disch-Falk Field	15–3	29–7	–
March 25	at Arkansas	George Cole Field	9–4	30–7	1–0
March 27	at Arkansas	George Cole Field	6–1	31–7	2–0
March 27	at Arkansas	George Cole Field	11–9	32–7	3–0

April

Date	Opponent	Site/stadium	Score	Overall Record	Big 12 Record
April 1	TCU	Disch-Falk Field	6-5	33–7	4–0
April 2	TCU	Disch-Falk Field	0-1	33–8	4–1
April 2	TCU	Disch-Falk Field	11-9	34–8	5–1
April 5	Hardin-Simmons	Disch-Falk Field	10-2	35–8	–
April 5	Hardin-Simmons	Disch-Falk Field	7-1	36–8	–
April 8	at Baylor	Ferrell Field	9-2	37-8	6-1
April 9	at Baylor	Ferrell Field	8-0	38-8	7-1
April 9	at Baylor	Ferrell Field	7-2	39-8	8-1
April 15	Rice	Disch-Falk Field	4-3	40–8	9–1
April 16	Rice	Disch-Falk Field	7-6	41–8	10–1
April 16	Rice	Disch-Falk Field	3-2	42–8	11–1
April 22	Texas Tech	Disch-Falk Field	12-3	43-8	12-1
April 23	Texas Tech	Disch-Falk Field	9-1	44-8	13-1
April 23	Texas Tech	Disch-Falk Field	9-2	45-8	14-1
April 29	Houston	Disch-Falk Field	3-4	45-9	14-2
April 30	Houston	Disch-Falk Field	3-4	45-10	14-3
April 30	Houston	Disch-Falk Field	12-2	46-10	15-3

May

Date	Opponent	Site/stadium	Score	Overall Record	Big 12 Record
May 2	at Oral Roberts	J. L. Johnson Stadium	6-7	46-11	-
May 3	at Oral Roberts	J. L. Johnson Stadium	1-6	46-12	-
May 6	at Texas A&M	Olsen Field	13–4	47–12	16–3
May 7	at Texas A&M	Olsen Field	14–11	48–12	17–3
May 7	at Texas A&M	Olsen Field	3–0	49–12	18–3

Postseason
SWC Tournament

Date	Opponent	Site/stadium	Score	Overall Record
May 13	vs. Rice	Disch-Falk Field	4–3	50–12
May 14	vs. Arkansas	Disch-Falk Field	9–2	51–12
May 15	vs. Arkansas	Disch-Falk Field	4–5	51–13
May 16	vs. Arkansas	Disch-Falk Field	14–0	52–13

May (After SWC Tournament)

Date	Opponent	Site/stadium	Score	Overall Record	Big 12 Record
May 19	Lubbock Christian	Disch-Falk Field	8–5	53–13	-
May 21	Lubbock Christian	Disch-Falk Field	4–3	54–13	-
May 22	Lubbock Christian	Disch-Falk Field	5–0	55–13	-
May 22	Lubbock Christian	Disch-Falk Field	9–2	56–13	-

NCAA tournament: Central Regional

Date	Opponent	Site/stadium	Score	Overall Record
May 26	vs. NE Louisiana	Disch-Falk Field	15–0	57–13
May 27	vs. Mississippi State	Disch-Falk Field	2–6	57–14
May 28	vs. Tulane	Disch-Falk Field	7–5	58–14
May 28	vs. Texas-Pan American	Disch-Falk Field	6–1	59–14
May 29	vs. Mississippi State	Disch-Falk Field	7–0	60–14
May 29	vs. Mississippi State	Disch-Falk Field	12–3	61–14

NCAA tournament: College World Series

Date	Opponent	Site/stadium	Score	Overall Record
June 3	vs. James Madison	Rosenblatt Stadium	12–0	62–14
June 6	vs. Oklahoma State	Rosenblatt Stadium	6–5	63–14
June 8	vs. Alabama	Rosenblatt Stadium	6–4	64–14
June 10	vs. Michigan	Rosenblatt Stadium	4–2	65–14
June 11	vs. Alabama	Rosenblatt Stadium	4–3	66–14

== Awards and honors ==
Billy Bates

- College World Series All-Tournament Team
- Freshman All-American

Mike Brumley

- College World Series All-Tournament Team
- First Team All-SWC

Jeff Hearron

- College World Series All-Tournament Team

Kirk Killingsworth

- First Team All-SWC

Calvin Schiraldi

- College World Series Most Outstanding Player
- First Team All-American
- First Team All-SWC

Jose Tolentino

- First Team All-SWC

== Longhorns in the 1983 MLB draft ==
The following members of the Texas Longhorns baseball program were drafted in the 1983 Major League Baseball draft.

Player	Position	Round	Overall	MLB team
Roger Clemens	RHP	1st	19th	Boston Red Sox
Calvin Schiraldi	RHP	1st	27th	New York Mets
Mike Brumley	SS	2nd	33rd	Boston Red Sox
Jeff Hearron	C	4th	89th	Toronto Blue Jays
Kirk Killingsworth	RHP	7th	161st	Texas Rangers
Jose Tolentino	1B	7th	163rd	Oakland Athletics
Mike Capel	RHP	13th	320th	Chicago Cubs
Bryan Burrows	3B	33rd	778th	Pittsburgh Pirates
