= 1983 Maine Black Bears baseball team =

1983 Maine Black Bears baseball

ECAC New England baseball tournament champion NCAA Northeast Regional champion

College World Series, 0–2
- Conference: Eastern College Athletic Conference
- Record: 29–16 (11–1 ECAC)
- Head coach: John Winkin (9th season)

1983 Eastern College Athletic Conference baseball standings
	Conf.				Overall
Team	W		L	PCT	W		L	PCT
New England
No. 7 Maine ^{x}‍‍‡‍^{y}	11	–	1	.917	29	–	16	.644
Connecticut ‍‍‍	8	–	5	.615	18	–	14	.563
New Hampshire ‍‍‍	10	–	8	.556	16	–	11	.593
Holy Cross ‍‍‍	9	–	9	.500	11	–	16	.407
Boston College ‍‍‍	4	–	6	.400	11	–	9	.550
Vermont ‍‍‍	5	–	8	.385	8	–	13	.381
Northeastern ‍‍‍	2	–	6	.250	15	–	14	.517
Metro and South
No. 8 James Madison ‍‍‍^{y}	12	–	4	.750	37	–	13	.740
NYIT ‍‍‍^{y}		–		–	24	–	10	.706
Seton Hall ‍‍‍	20	–	5	.800	34	–	15	.694
Fordham ‍‍‍	3	–	2	.600	14	–	19	.424
Georgetown ‍‍‍	8	–	7	.533	28	–	21	.571
William & Mary ‍‍‍^{y}		–		–	24	–	16	.600
George Mason ‍‍‍	5	–	9	.357	19	–	24	.442
Canisius ‍‍‍	1	–	7	.125	12	–	11	.522
x – Division champion ‡ – Tournament champion y – Invited to the NCAA tournament As of June 30, 1983; Rankings from Collegiate Baseball

The 1983 Maine Black Bears baseball team represented the University of Maine in the 1983 NCAA Division I baseball season. The Black Bears were led by John Winkin in his 9th year as head coach, and played as a members of the Eastern College Athletic Conference.

Maine posted a 29–16 record and 11–1 in ECAC, and won the Eastern College Athletic Conference New England Tournament to claim the automatic bid to the 1983 NCAA Division I baseball tournament. They swept the Northeast Regional to advance to the 1983 College World Series, their fifth (and third consecutive) appearance in Omaha. The Black Bears finished tied for seventh after losses to eventual semifinalists Michigan and Arizona State.

== Personnel ==
=== Roster ===
1983 Maine Black Bears baseball roster
Pitchers: 6 - John Balerna - Senior; 30 - Mike Ballou - Freshman; 27 - Robert Colford - Senior; 3 - Kevin Jordan - Junior; - Ty Kerr - Sophomore; 17 - John Kowalski - Sophomore; 16 - Stu Lacognata - Junior; 19 - Bill McInnis - Freshman; 8 - Bill Swift - Junior; 14 - Ernie Webster - Sophomore; 15 - Robert Wilkins - Sophomore	Catchers: 12 - Peter Bushway - Junior; 25 - Ed Hackett - Junior; - Richard Wilkins - Sophomore; Outfielders: 20 - Brad Colton - Senior; 28 - Jim Davins - Freshman; 29 - Rick Lashua - Junior; 19 - Bill McInnis - Freshman; 24 - Tom Vanidestine - Senior; 22 - Dick Whitten - Senior	Infielders: 7 - Rick Bernardo - Freshman; 4 - Kevin Bernier - Senior; 23 - Mark Coutts - Freshman; 18 - Tim Layman - Junior; 1 - Bill Nutter - Freshman; 9 - Jeff Paul - Junior; 21 - Bill Reynolds - Freshman; 11 - Rob Roy - Sophomore; 10 - Fred Staples - Senior

==== Coaches ====
1983 Maine Black Bears baseball coaching staff
- 5 - John Winkin - Head coach - 9th season
- 31 - Brian Cox - Assistant coach - 4th season
- 2 - Bob Whalen - Assistant coach - 2nd season

== Schedule ==
1983 Maine Black Bears baseball game log
Regular season

March
Date	Opponent	Site/stadium	Score	Overall record	ECAC record
Mar 12	vs Texas A&M*	Mark Light Field • Coral Gables, FL	L 2–8	0–1	
Mar 13	vs Texas A&M*	Mark Light Field • Coral Gables, FL	L 8–12	0–2	
Mar 14	vs Southern Illinois*	Mark Light Field • Coral Gables, FL	L 5–8	0–3	
Mar 15	at Miami (FL)*	Mark Light Field • Coral Gables, FL	L 5–14	0–4	
	at Biscayne*	Miami, FL	L 5–8	0–5	
Mar 16	at Southern Illinois*	Miami, FL	W 8–1	1–5	
Mar 18	at FIU*	Miami, FL	L 2–11	1–6	
Mar 18	at Miami (FL)*	Mark Light Field • Coral Gables, FL	L 5–7	1–7	
	vs UIC*	Miami, FL	W 9–5	2–7	
Mar 20	at Miami (FL)*	Mark Light Field • Coral Gables, FL	L 3–7	2–8	
	vs Glassboro State*	Miami, FL	W 5–3	3–8	
	vs UIC*	Miami, FL	W 8–1	4–8	
Mar 22	at Miami (FL)*	Mark Light Field • Coral Gables, FL	L 1–6	4–9	
Mar 23	at FIU*	Miami, FL	L 5–8	4–10	
Mar 24	at FIU*	Miami, FL	W 7–5	5–10	
	vs Glassboro State*	Miami, FL	L 1–2 ^{12}	5–11	
Mar 25	at FIU*	Miami, FL	W 5–3	6–11	
	vs St. Francis (NY)*	Miami, FL	W 8–4	7–11	
	Rhode Island*		L 1–2	7–12	

April/May
Date	Opponent	Site/stadium	Score	Overall record	ECAC record
Apr 2	at UMass	Earl Lorden Field • Amherst, MA	W 5–0	8–12	1–0
Apr 2	at UMass	Earl Lorden Field • Amherst, MA	W 8–4	9–12	2–0
	vs Fairfield	Hendricken Field • Providence, RI	W 8–2	10–12	3–0
	vs Holy Cross	Hendricken Field • Providence, RI	W 7–5	11–12	4–0
	at Providence	Hendricken Field • Providence, RI	W 5–4	12–12	5–0
	vs Fairfield	Hendricken Field • Providence, RI	W 6–0	13–12	6–0
Apr 19	at Colby*	Coombs Field • Waterville, ME	W 21–2	14–12	
Apr 20	Southern Maine*	Mahaney Diamond • Orono, ME	W 23–0	15–12	
Apr 20	Southern Maine	Mahaney Diamond • Orono, ME	W 8–3	16–12	
	New Hampshire		L 5–6	16–13	6–1
	New Hampshire		W 6–3	17–13	7–1
	Holy Cross		W 23–1	18–13	8–1
	Boston College	Mahaney Diamond • Orono, ME	W 9–5	19–13	9–1
May 5	Husson*	Mahaney Diamond • Orono, ME	W 11–0	20–13	
May 6	Colby*	Mahaney Diamond • Orono, ME	W 12–4	21–13	
	Northeastern	Mahaney Diamond • Orono, ME	W 5–2	22–13	10–1
	Northeastern	Mahaney Diamond • Orono, ME	W 7–2	23–13	11–1

Postseason

ECAC New England baseball tournament
Date	Opponent	Site/stadium	Score	Overall record	ECACT record
May 12	Providence	McCoy Stadium • Pawtucket, RI	W 5–4 ^{(18)}	24–13	1–0
May 14	UMass	McCoy Stadium • Pawtucket, RI	W 5–0	25–13	2–0
May 15	Connecticut	McCoy Stadium • Pawtucket, RI	L 1–2	25–14	2–1
May 15	Connecticut	McCoy Stadium • Pawtucket, RI	W 7–0	26–14	3–1

NCAA Northeast Regional
Date	Opponent	Site/stadium	Score	Overall record	NCAAT record
May 28	NYIT	Mahaney Diamond • Orono, ME	W 8–2	27–14	1–0
May 29	Harvard	Mahaney Diamond • Orono, ME	W 6–2	28–14	2–0
May 31	Harvard	Mahaney Diamond • Orono, ME	W 4–3	29–14	3–0

College World Series
Date	Opponent	Site/stadium	Score	Overall record	CWS record
June 4	Michigan	Johnny Rosenblatt Stadium • Omaha, NE	L 5–6	29–15	0–1
June 5	Arizona State	Johnny Rosenblatt Stadium • Omaha, NE	L 0–7	29–16	0–2
