= Brad Babcock =

American baseball player and coach (1939–2020)

Biographical details
- Born: March 10, 1939; Virginia, U.S.
- Died: June 2, 2020 (aged 81); Appomattox, Virginia, U.S.

Playing career
- 1960–1963: Lynchburg
- Position: Shortstop

Coaching career (HC unless noted)
- 1971–1989: James Madison

Head coaching record
- Overall: 555–251–4
- Tournaments: NCAA D1: 10–13; CAA: 6–8

Bradley Littleton Babcock (March 10, 1939 – June 2, 2020) was an American college baseball coach, the head coach of James Madison (JMU) from 1971 to 1989. Under him, the Dukes appeared in five NCAA tournaments (four in Division I) and the 1983 College World Series. His overall record in 19 seasons was 555–251–4, including a home record of 339–71–1.

== Coaching career ==
After graduating from Lynchburg College in 1963, Babcock worked as a high school baseball coach in Colorado, New Hampshire, and Vermont.

James Madison started its baseball program in 1970, shortly after it became co-educational. Babcock took over in 1971, its second season. It started out as an NCAA Division II program but joined Division I for the 1977 season.

In addition to being JMU's baseball coach, Babcock held several other positions in the early 1970s. At the university, he was an assistant football coach, junior varsity basketball coach, physical education instructor, and intramural director. He also served as the head coach of the Valley League's Harrisonburg Turks for several summers.

In 1983, the Dukes became the first Virginia school to make the College World Series (CWS). The Dukes opened the season with an exhibition game against the St. Louis Cardinals. After losing in the ECAC Tournament, many players returned home, thinking the season was over, but the team was given an at-large bid to the NCAA tournament. JMU went 4–0 in the East Regional to reach the CWS, where it lost games to Texas and Stanford in Omaha.

== Head coaching record ==
Below is a table of Babcock's yearly records as a collegiate head baseball coach.

Record table
Season	Team	Overall	Conference	Standing	Postseason
Madison Dukes (Independent) (1971–1976)
1971	Madison	12–5			
1972	Madison	11–14			
1973	Madison	12–9			
1974	Madison	23–11			
1975	Madison	23–7			
1976	Madison	32–10			NCAA Regional
James Madison (Eastern Collegiate Athletic Conference – Division I) (1977–1985)
1977	Madison	32–9			
1978	James Madison	30–13			ECAC Tournament
1979	James Madison	31–13			ECAC Tournament
1980	James Madison	32–13			NCAA Regional
1981	James Madison	40–18–1			NCAA Regional
1982	James Madison	40–15–1			ECAC Tournament
1983	James Madison	37–13			College World Series
1984	James Madison	38–13			ECAC Tournament
1985	James Madison	24–21			
James Madison (Colonial Athletic Association) (1986–1989)
1986	James Madison	35–14	13–5	2nd	CAA Tournament
1987	James Madison	28–21	6–9	5th	CAA Tournament (Note: In this season, each member of the Colonial Athletic Association qualified for the conference tournament.)
1988	James Madison	43–11–2	13–1	1st	NCAA Regional
1989	James Madison	32–21	7–6	3rd	CAA Tournament
James Madison:		555–251–4	39–21		
Total:		555–251–4			
National champion Postseason invitational champion Conference regular season champion Conference regular season and conference tournament champion Division regular season champion Division regular season and conference tournament champion Conference tournament champion

== Administrative career ==
After stepping down from the baseball coach position following the 1989 season, Babcock worked in JMU's athletic department. He was added to the department's Hall of Fame in 1998. He retired as executive association athletic director in 2003.

== Personal ==
Babcock's son Whit is the athletic director at Virginia Tech; he previously held the same position at Cincinnati. Whit was the batboy on the 1983 College World Series team and played for Babcock in 1989, his final season as JMU's head coach. Babcock died on June 2, 2020, at the age of 81.
