= 1983 Alabama Crimson Tide baseball team =

American college baseball season

1983 Alabama Crimson Tide baseball

SEC Tournament champions South Regional champions

College World Series, runner-up
- Conference: Southeastern Conference
- Western Division
- Record: 46–11 (14–7 SEC)
- Head coach: Barry Shollenberger (4th season)
- Home stadium: Sewell–Thomas Stadium

1983 Southeastern Conference baseball standings
	Conf.				Overall
Team	W		L	PCT	W		L	PCT
Eastern Division
Florida ^{x}‍‍‍	14	–	7	.667	38	–	14	.731
Tennessee ‍‍‍	12	–	7	.632	26	–	16	.619
Georgia ‍‍‍	11	–	9	.550	29	–	19	.604
Kentucky ‍‍‍	6	–	11	.353	31	–	14	.689
Vanderbilt ‍‍‍	6	–	15	.286	22	–	23	.489
Western Division
No. 12 Mississippi State ^{x}‍‍‍^{y}	17	–	5	.773	42	–	15	.737
No. 2 Alabama ‍‍‡‍^{y}	14	–	7	.667	46	–	11	.807
Ole Miss ‍‍‍	10	–	12	.455	26	–	18	.591
LSU ‍‍‍	9	–	12	.429	28	–	21	.571
Auburn ‍‍‍	4	–	18	.182	16	–	34	.320
x – Division champion ‡ – Tournament champion y – Invited to the NCAA tournament As of June 30, 1983; Rankings from Collegiate Baseball

The 1983 Alabama Crimson Tide baseball team represented the University of Alabama in the 1983 NCAA Division I baseball season. The Crimson Tide played their home games at Sewell–Thomas Stadium, and were led by fourth-year head coach Barry Shollenberger. They finished as the national runner-up after falling to Texas in the 1983 College World Series Final.

== Roster ==
1983 Alabama Crimson Tide roster
Pitchers: Troy Brauchle; Jeff Brewer; Rick Browne; Alan Dunn; Dean Hayes; Tim Meacham	Catchers: Frank Velleggia; Infielders: Bret Elbin; Fermin Lake; Dave Magadan - Junior; Ted McClendon; Craig Shipley	Outfielders: Rob Skates; Allan Stallings	Coaching staff: Barry Shollenberger – Head Coach; Roger Smith; Steve Fleming; Eddie Franks

== Schedule ==
Legend
Alabama win
Alabama loss

1983 Alabama Crimson Tide baseball game log
Regular season
February (4–0)

Date	Opponent	Stadium	Score	Overall Record	SEC Record
February 24	North Alabama	Sewell–Thomas Stadium	10–6	1–0	–
February 25	at Alabama Christian	Unknown	4–11	2–0	–
February 26	at South Alabama	Eddie Stanky Field	8–2	3–0	–
February 26	at Southern Mississippi	Sewell–Thomas Stadium	18–7	4–0	–

March (14–2)

Date	Opponent	Stadium	Score	Overall Record	SEC Record
March 2	Southern Mississippi	Sewell–Thomas Stadium	14–1	5–0	–
March 6	at Mississippi State	Dudy Noble Field	6–18	5–1	0–1
March 6	at Mississippi State	Dudy Noble Field	5–6	5–2	0–2
March 8	at Clemson	Beautiful Tiger Field	6–5	6–2	0–2
March 9	at Clemson	Beautiful Tiger Field	7–4	7–2	0–2
March 12	South Alabama	Sewell–Thomas Stadium	16–5	8–2	0–2
March 13	South Alabama	Sewell–Thomas Stadium	8–6	9–2	0–2
March 15	Memphis State	Sewell–Thomas Stadium	12–7	10–2	0–2
March 19	LSU	Sewell–Thomas Stadium	4–1	11–2	1–2
March 19	LSU	Sewell–Thomas Stadium	17–7	12–2	2–2
March 22	Georgia Southern	Sewell–Thomas Stadium	14–1	13–2	2–2
March 23	Georgia Southern	Sewell–Thomas Stadium	14–1	14–2	2–2
March 27	at Ole Miss	Swayze Field	12–3	15–2	3–2
March 27	at Ole Miss	Swayze Field	8–2	16–2	4–2
March 29	Delta State	Sewell–Thomas Stadium	3–9	16–3	4–2
March 30	Delta State	Sewell–Thomas Stadium	2–1	17–3	4–2
March 31	Auburn	Rickwood Field	12–3	18–3	4–2

April (13–6)

Date	Opponent	Stadium	Score	Overall Record	SEC Record
April 2	Auburn	Sewell–Thomas Stadium	6–5	19–3	5–2
April 3	Auburn	Sewell–Thomas Stadium	3–2	20–3	6–2
April 3	Auburn	Sewell–Thomas Stadium	6–7	20–4	6–3
April 9	Mississippi State	Sewell–Thomas Stadium	10–13	20–5	6–4
April 9	Mississippi State	Sewell–Thomas Stadium	10–12	20–6	6–5
April 10	Mississippi State	Sewell–Thomas Stadium	12–9	21–6	7–5
April 12	Alabama State	Sewell–Thomas Stadium	10–4	22–6	7–5
April 13	Jackson State	Sewell–Thomas Stadium	15–4	23–6	7–5
April 16	Alabama Christian	Sewell–Thomas Stadium	6–5	24–6	7–5
April 17	Livingston	Sewell–Thomas Stadium	8–6	25–6	7–5
April 19	at Memphis State	Nat Buring Stadium	2–5	25–7	7–5
April 20	at Memphis State	Nat Buring Stadium	3–2	26–7	7–5
April 23	at LSU	Alex Box Stadium	7–8	26–8	7–6
April 23	at LSU	Alex Box Stadium	10–3	27–8	8–6
April 24	at LSU	Alex Box Stadium	10–5	28–8	8–6
April 26	at Southern Mississippi	Unknown	17–1	29–8	9–6
April 27	at Southern Mississippi	Unknown	9–3	30–8	9–6
April 30	Ole Miss	Sewell–Thomas Stadium	3–4	30–9	9–7
April 30	Ole Miss	Sewell–Thomas Stadium	5–4	31–9	10–7

May (6–0)

Date	Opponent	Stadium	Score	Overall Record	SEC Record
May 1	Ole Miss	Sewell–Thomas Stadium	17–10	32–9	11–7
May 2	Columbus	Sewell–Thomas Stadium	18–12	33–9	11–7
May 4	Columbus	Sewell–Thomas Stadium	15–9	34–9	11–7
May 7	at Auburn	Plainsman Park	9–1	35–9	12–7
May 7	at Auburn	Plainsman Park	6–4	36–9	13–7
May 8	at Auburn	Plainsman Park	13–5	37–9	14–7

Postseason
SEC Tournament (3–0)

Date	Opponent	Site/stadium	Score	Overall Record	SEC Record
May 13	vs Florida	Dudy Noble Field	15–2	38–9	14–7
May 14	vs Tennessee	Dudy Noble Field	8–6	39–9	14–7
May 15	at Mississippi State	Dudy Noble Field	10–9	40–9	14–7

South Regional (3–0)

Date	Opponent	Site/stadium	Score	Overall Record	SEC Record
May 27	vs Miami (FL)	Seminole Stadium	6–4	41–9	14–7
May 28	at Florida State	Seminole Stadium	7–5	42–9	14–7
May 29	vs Miami (FL)	Seminole Stadium	11–9	43–9	14–7

1983 College World Series (3–2)

Date	Opponent	Site/stadium	Score	Overall Record	SEC Record
June 4	vs Arizona State	Johnny Rosenblatt Stadium	6–5	44–9	14–7
June 7	vs Michigan	Johnny Rosenblatt Stadium	6–5	45–9	14–7
June 9	vs Texas	Johnny Rosenblatt Stadium	4–6	45–10	14–7
June 10	vs Arizona State	Johnny Rosenblatt Stadium	6–0	46–10	14–7
June 11	vs Texas	Johnny Rosenblatt Stadium	3–4	46–11	14–7

== Awards and honors ==
Dave Magadan

- College World Series All-Tournament Team
- Golden Spikes Award

Tim Meacham

- College World Series All-Tournament Team

== Crimson Tide in the 1983 MLB draft ==
The following members of the Alabama Crimson Tide baseball program were drafted in the 1983 Major League Baseball draft.

Player	Position	Round	Overall	MLB team
Dave Magadan	1B	2nd	32nd	New York Mets
Alan Dunn	RHP	4th	95th	Detroit Tigers
Rick Browne	LHP	8th	195th	Cleveland Indians
Tim Meacham	RHP	9th	224th	Montreal Expos
Frank Velleggia	C	26th	641st	New York Mets
John Elbin	3B	31st	744th	Texas Rangers
