= 1983 Oklahoma State Cowboys baseball team =

American college baseball season

1983 Oklahoma State Cowboys baseball

Big Eight champions Midwest Regional champions

College World Series, T-5th
- Conference: Big Eight Conference
- CB: No. 5
- Record: 48–16 (11–3 Big 8)
- Head coach: Gary Ward (6th season)
- Pitching coach: Tom Holliday (6th season)
- Home stadium: Allie P. Reynolds Stadium

1983 Big Eight Conference baseball standings
	Conf.				Overall
Team	W		L	PCT	W		L	PCT
No. 5 Oklahoma State ‍†‍‡‍^{y}	11	–	3	.786	48	–	16	.750
No. 26 Oklahoma ‍‍‍	18	–	6	.750	39	–	20	.661
Kansas ‍‍‍	8	–	7	.533	17	–	17	.500
Missouri ‍‍‍	7	–	8	.467	25	–	16	.610
Nebraska ‍‍‍	8	–	10	.444	42	–	15	.737
Iowa State ‍‍‍	5	–	9	.357	21	–	26	.447
Kansas State ‍‍‍	2	–	16	.111	18	–	25	.419
† – Conference champion ‡ – Tournament champion y – Invited to the NCAA tournament As of June 30, 1983; Rankings from Collegiate Baseball

The 1983 Oklahoma State Cowboys baseball team represented the Oklahoma State University in the 1983 NCAA Division I baseball season. The Cowboys played their home games at Allie P. Reynolds Stadium. The team was coached by Gary Ward in his 6th year at Oklahoma State.

The Cowboys won the Midwest Regional to advance to the College World Series, where they were defeated by the Arizona State Sun Devils.

== Roster ==
1983 Oklahoma State Cowboys baseball team
Players
Coaches

#	Pos.	Name	B/T	Height	Weight	Year	Home town
	C	John Apicella	/	—	—
	LHP	Tony Bartiolomucci	/L	—	—
	RHP	Chris Bayley	/R	—	—
	INF	Chris Beck	/	—	—
		Brad Bell	/	—	—
	C	Michael Day	/	—	—
	C	Carlos Diaz	/	—	—
	RHP	John Duval	/R	—	—
42	OF	Glenn Edwards	R/R	6 ft 0 in (1.83 m)	170 lb (77 kg)
	RHP	John Farrell	R/R	6 ft 4 in (1.93 m)	210 lb (95 kg)		Monmouth Beach, New Jersey
	INF	Kevin Fowler	/R	—	—
	INF	Joe Gorman	/L	—	—
7	INF	Gary Green	R/R	6 ft 3 in (1.91 m)	175 lb (79 kg)		Pittsburgh, Pennsylvania
	RHP	Mike Henneman	/R	—	—
29	OF	Pete Incaviglia	/L	—	—	Fr
	INF	Kevin Jagielo	/	—	—
	RHP	Gary Kanwisher	/R	6 ft 3 in (1.91 m)	200 lb (91 kg)		Hillsdale, New Jersey
	OF	Tim Knapp	L/	—	—		Lima, Oklahoma
	OF	Bryan Kostishion	/	—	—
	LHP	Reese Lambert	/L	—	—
	LHP	Paul Lepre	/L	—	—
10	LHP	Dennis Livingston	R/L	6 ft 0 in (1.83 m)	185 lb (84 kg)	So	North Reading, Massachusetts
	INF	Steve O'Donnell	S/R	5 ft 11 in (1.8 m)	165 lb (75 kg)		Connellsville, Pennsylvania
	RHP	Eric Schmidt	/R	—	—
25		Scott Wade	R/R	6 ft 2 in (1.88 m)	200 lb (91 kg)		Seabrook, Maryland
	RHP	Rob Walton	/R	—	—
	INF	Randy Whisler	R/R	5 ft 9 in (1.75 m)	170 lb (77 kg)		Klamath Falls, Oregon
15	C	Robbie Wine	R/R	6 ft 2 in (1.88 m)	190 lb (86 kg)		Norristown, Pennsylvania

Head coach

24 Gary Ward

Assistant coach(es)

Wade Robertson

Pitching coach(es)

Tom Holliday

Legend

- (C) Team captain
- (S) Suspended
- (I) Ineligible
- Injured
- Current redshirt

Roster
Last update: February 28, 2021

== Schedule ==
1983 Oklahoma State Cowboys baseball game log
Regular season
February (2–0)

#	Date	Opponent	Site/stadium	Score	Overall record	Big 8 record
1	February 26	at Cal State Fullerton	Titan Field • Fullerton, California	7–4	1–0	–
2	February 28	at UNLV	Unknown • Las Vegas, Nevada	18–5	2–0	–

March (16–6)

#	Date	Opponent	Site/stadium	Score	Overall record	Big 8 record
3	March 1	at UNLV	Unknown • Las Vegas, Nevada	9–6	3–0	–
4	March 4	at Texas Tech	Tech Diamond • Lubbock, Texas	5–7	3–1	–
5	March 4	at Texas Tech	Tech Diamond • Lubbock, Texas	7–8	3–2	–
6	March 5	at Texas Tech	Tech Diamond • Lubbock, Texas	15–4	4–2	–
7	March 7	vs Arkansas State	Unknown • Edinburg, Texas	5–6	4–3	–
8	March 7	at Texas–Pan American	Unknown • Edinburg, Texas	2–9	4–4	–
9	March 8	vs Stephen F. Austin	Unknown • Edinburg, Texas	9–2	5–4	–
10	March 9	vs Arkansas State	Unknown • Edinburg, Texas	3–4	5–5	–
11	March 10	vs Morningside	Unknown • Edinburg, Texas	17–6	6–5	–
12	March 11	vs Central Michigan	Unknown • Edinburg, Texas	1–7	6–6	–
13	March 12	vs Arkansas State	Unknown • Edinburg, Texas	6–0	7–6	–
14	March 16	Texas Wesleyan	Allie P. Reynolds Stadium • Stillwater, Oklahoma	11–1	8–6	–
15	March 16	Texas Wesleyan	Allie P. Reynolds Stadium • Stillwater, Oklahoma	4–1	9–6	–
16	March 21	Phillips	Allie P. Reynolds Stadium • Stillwater, Oklahoma	11–1	10–6	–
17	March 21	Phillips	Allie P. Reynolds Stadium • Stillwater, Oklahoma	13–0	11–6	–
18	March 22	Missouri Southern	Allie P. Reynolds Stadium • Stillwater, Oklahoma	7–6	12–6	–
19	March 22	Missouri Southern	Allie P. Reynolds Stadium • Stillwater, Oklahoma	11–1	13–6	–
20	March 24	Oklahoma Christian	Allie P. Reynolds Stadium • Stillwater, Oklahoma	11–3	14–6	–
21	March 27	Midwestern State	Allie P. Reynolds Stadium • Stillwater, Oklahoma	4–1	15–6	–
22	March 27	Midwestern State	Allie P. Reynolds Stadium • Stillwater, Oklahoma	4–0	16–6	–
23	March 28	Midwestern State	Allie P. Reynolds Stadium • Stillwater, Oklahoma	8–7	17–6	–
24	March 28	Midwestern State	Allie P. Reynolds Stadium • Stillwater, Oklahoma	6–4	18–6	–

April (14–7)

#	Date	Opponent	Site/stadium	Score	Overall record	Big 8 record
25	April 2	Oklahoma	Allie P. Reynolds Stadium • Stillwater, Oklahoma	7–9	18–7	0–1
26	April 2	Oklahoma	Allie P. Reynolds Stadium • Stillwater, Oklahoma	15–14	19–7	1–1
27	April 3	Oklahoma	Allie P. Reynolds Stadium • Stillwater, Oklahoma	1–6	19–8	1–2
28	April 3	Oklahoma	Allie P. Reynolds Stadium • Stillwater, Oklahoma	7–11	19–9	1–3
29	April 11	at Kansas State	KSU Baseball Stadium • Manhattan, Kansas	13–0	20–9	2–3
30	April 11	at Kansas State	KSU Baseball Stadium • Manhattan, Kansas	9–1	21–9	3–3
31	April 15	at Oral Roberts	J. L. Johnson Stadium • Tulsa, Oklahoma	2–10	21–10	3–3
32	April 16	Oral Roberts	Allie P. Reynolds Stadium • Stillwater, Oklahoma	6–5	22–10	3–3
33	April 16	Oral Roberts	Allie P. Reynolds Stadium • Stillwater, Oklahoma	8–10	22–11	3–3
34	April 17	Wichita State	Allie P. Reynolds Stadium • Stillwater, Oklahoma	15–6	23–11	3–3
35	April 17	Wichita State	Allie P. Reynolds Stadium • Stillwater, Oklahoma	1–8	23–12	3–3
36	April 19	Arkansas–Little Rock	Allie P. Reynolds Stadium • Stillwater, Oklahoma	11–2	24–12	3–3
37	April 19	Arkansas–Little Rock	Allie P. Reynolds Stadium • Stillwater, Oklahoma	3–5	24–13	3–3
38	April 20	Arkansas–Little Rock	Allie P. Reynolds Stadium • Stillwater, Oklahoma	4–2	25–13	3–3
39	April 20	Arkansas–Little Rock	Allie P. Reynolds Stadium • Stillwater, Oklahoma	10–3	26–13	3–3
40	April 23	Missouri	Allie P. Reynolds Stadium • Stillwater, Oklahoma	5–1	27–13	4–3
41	April 23	Missouri	Allie P. Reynolds Stadium • Stillwater, Oklahoma	8–2	28–13	5–3
42	April 24	Missouri	Allie P. Reynolds Stadium • Stillwater, Oklahoma	13–6	29–13	6–3
43	April 24	Missouri	Allie P. Reynolds Stadium • Stillwater, Oklahoma	18–8	30–13	7–3
44	April 26	Midwestern State	Allie P. Reynolds Stadium • Stillwater, Oklahoma	21–7	31–13	7–3
45	April 27	at Oklahoma City	Jim Wade Stadium • Oklahoma City, Oklahoma	23–6	32–13	7–3

May (5–0)

#	Date	Opponent	Site/stadium	Score	Overall record	Big 8 record
46	May 4	Oklahoma City	Allie P. Reynolds Stadium • Stillwater, Oklahoma	6–4	33–13	7–3
47	May 7	Nebraska	Allie P. Reynolds Stadium • Stillwater, Oklahoma	16–4	34–13	8–3
48	May 7	Nebraska	Allie P. Reynolds Stadium • Stillwater, Oklahoma	5–2	35–13	9–3
49	May 8	Nebraska	Allie P. Reynolds Stadium • Stillwater, Oklahoma	3–2	36–13	10–3
50	May 8	Nebraska	Allie P. Reynolds Stadium • Stillwater, Oklahoma	4–1	37–13	11–3

Postseason
Big Eight Conference Tournament (4–1)

#	Date	Opponent	Site/stadium	Score	Overall record	Big 8 record
51	May 12	vs Nebraska	Unknown • Oklahoma City, Oklahoma	9–6	38–13	11–3
52	May 15	vs Oklahoma	Unknown • Oklahoma City, Oklahoma	3–1	39–13	11–3
53	May 16	vs Missouri	Unknown • Oklahoma City, Oklahoma	6–5	40–13	11–3
54	May 16	vs Oklahoma	Unknown • Oklahoma City, Oklahoma	8–10	40–14	11–3
55	May 17	vs Oklahoma	Unknown • Oklahoma City, Oklahoma	13–4	41–14	11–3

May (3–0)

#	Date	Opponent	Site/stadium	Score	Overall record	Big 8 record
56	May 21	Coastal Carolina	Allie P. Reynolds Stadium • Stillwater, Oklahoma	12–4	42–14	11–3
57	May 22	Coastal Carolina	Allie P. Reynolds Stadium • Stillwater, Oklahoma	2–0	43–14	11–3
58	May 22	Coastal Carolina	Allie P. Reynolds Stadium • Stillwater, Oklahoma	13–6	44–14	11–3

NCAA Midwest Regional (3–0)

#	Date	Opponent	Site/stadium	Score	Overall record	Big 8 record
59	May 26	Wichita State	Allie P. Reynolds Stadium • Stillwater, Oklahoma	9–2	45–14	11–3
60	May 27	Oral Roberts	Allie P. Reynolds Stadium • Stillwater, Oklahoma	9–8	46–14	11–3
61	May 29	Oral Roberts	Allie P. Reynolds Stadium • Stillwater, Oklahoma	10–9	47–14	11–3

College World Series (1–2)

#	Date	Opponent	Site/stadium	Score	Overall record	Big 8 record
62	June 3	vs Stanford	Johnny Rosenblatt Stadium • Omaha, Nebraska	3–1	48–14	11–3
63	June 6	vs Texas	Johnny Rosenblatt Stadium • Omaha, Nebraska	5–6	48–15	11–3
64	June 8	vs Arizona State	Johnny Rosenblatt Stadium • Omaha, Nebraska	5–6	48–16	11–3

== Awards and honors ==
Glenn Edwards

- All-Big Eight Conference
- Third Team All-American American Baseball Coaches Association
- Second Team All-American Baseball America

Joe Gorman

- Big Eight Conference All-Tournament Team

Pete Incaviglia

- Third Team All-American Baseball America
- College World Series All-Tournament Team

Tim Knapp

- College World Series All-Tournament Team

Dennis Livingston

- All-Big Eight Conference
- Second Team All-American American Baseball Coaches Association
- First Team All-American Baseball America

Steve O'Donnell

- Big Eight Conference All-Tournament Team

Eric Schmidt

- All-Big Eight Conference
- Big Eight Conference All-Tournament Team

Scott Wade

- Big Eight Conference All-Tournament Team
- Big Eight Conference Tournament MVP

Robbie Wine

- All-Big Eight Conference
