= 1983 Arizona State Sun Devils baseball team =

American college baseball season

1983 Arizona State Sun Devils baseball

NCAA West II Regional champions

College World Series, 2–2
- Conference: Pacific-10 Conference
- Record: 44–24 (17–13 Pac-10)
- Head coach: Jim Brock (12th year)
- Home stadium: Packard Stadium

1983 Pacific-10 Conference baseball standings
	Conf.						Overall
Team	W		L		T	PCT	W		L		T	PCT
Northern
Oregon State ^{x}‍‍‍	17	–	7	–	0	.708	27	–	15	–	0	.643
Washington State ‍‍‍	16	–	8	–	0	.667	39	–	17	–	1	.693
Washington ‍‍‍	12	–	11	–	0	.522	25	–	16	–	1	.607
Portland State ‍‍‍	11	–	12	–	0	.478	32	–	18	–	0	.640
Eastern Washington ‍‍‍	11	–	13	–	0	.458	25	–	17	–	0	.595
Portland ‍‍‍	10	–	14	–	0	.417	23	–	21	–	1	.522
Gonzaga ‍‍‍	6	–	18	–	0	.250	17	–	34	–	0	.333
Southern
No. 6 Stanford ^{x}‍‍‍^{y}	20	–	10	–	0	.667	42	–	17	–	1	.708
No. 3 Arizona State ‍‍‍^{y}	17	–	13	–	0	.567	44	–	24	–	0	.647
Southern California ‍‍‍	17	–	13	–	0	.567	32	–	23	–	1	.580
Arizona ‍‍‍	14	–	15	–	0	.483	25	–	31	–	0	.446
UCLA ‍‍‍	12	–	18	–	0	.400	28	–	24	–	1	.538
California ‍‍‍	9	–	20	–	0	.310	23	–	37	–	0	.383
x – Division champion y – Invited to the NCAA tournament As of June 30, 1983; Rankings from Collegiate Baseball

The 1983 Arizona State Sun Devils baseball team represented Arizona State University in the 1983 NCAA Division I baseball season. The Sun Devils played their home games at Packard Stadium, and played as part of the Pacific-10 Conference. The team was coached by Jim Brock in his twelfth season as head coach at Arizona State.

The Sun Devils reached the College World Series, their twelfth appearance in Omaha, where they finished tied for third place after winning games against Maine and Oklahoma State and losing twice to eventual runner-up Alabama.

== Personnel ==
=== Roster ===
1983 Arizona State Sun Devils roster
Pitchers: - Chris Beasley; - Jim Benedict; - Kendall Carter; - Dave Graybill; - Doug Henry; - Jim Jefferson; - Gilbert Villanueva; Catchers: - Don Wakamatsu; - Bruce Richey	Infielders: - Romy Cucjen; - Bert Martinez; - Greg Steen; Outfielders: - Barry Bonds; - Todd Brown; - Oddibe McDowell; - Steve Moses	Unknown: - Ted Dyson; - Brett Farrar; - Jim Jackson; - Lew Kent; - George Lopez; - Tom McNaughton; - Reggie Mosley; - Craig Pritchert; - Gary Reak; - Jeff Roberts; - Charles Scott; - Greg Shirley; - CJ Thompson; - Randy Rector

=== Coaches ===
1983 Arizona State Sun Devils baseball coaching staff
- Jim Brock - Head coach - 12th year

== Schedule and results ==
Legend
Arizona State win
Arizona State loss

1983 Arizona State Sun Devils baseball game log
Regular season

January/February
Date	Opponent	Site/stadium	Score	Overall record	Pac-10 record
Jan 31	Cal State Los Angeles*	Packard Stadium • Tempe, AZ	W 7–4	1–0	
Feb 1	Cal State Los Angeles*	Packard Stadium • Tempe, AZ	W 18–3	2–0	
Feb 2	Cal State Los Angeles*	Packard Stadium • Tempe, AZ	W 10–5	3–0	
Feb 4	at Miami (FL)*	Mark Light Field • Coral Gables, FL	W 4–3	4–0	
Feb 5	at Miami (FL)*	Mark Light Field • Coral Gables, FL	L 5–16	4–1	
Feb 6	at Miami (FL)*	Mark Light Field • Coral Gables, FL	L 5–13	4–2	
Feb 8	Cal State Northridge*	Packard Stadium • Tempe, AZ	W 7–5	5–2	
Feb 8	Cal State Northridge*	Packard Stadium • Tempe, AZ	W 2–0	6–2	
Feb 9	UC Riverside*	Packard Stadium • Tempe, AZ	W 2–1^{10}	7–2	
Feb 11	New Mexico*	Packard Stadium • Tempe, AZ	W 5–2	8–2	
Feb 12	New Mexico*	Packard Stadium • Tempe, AZ	W 17–1	9–2	
Feb 12	New Mexico*	Packard Stadium • Tempe, AZ	W 9–2	10–2	
Feb 14	La Verne*	Packard Stadium • Tempe, AZ	W 11–3	11–2	
Feb 15	La Verne*	Packard Stadium • Tempe, AZ	W 19–1	12–2	
Feb 17	UTEP*	Packard Stadium • Tempe, AZ	W 7–3	13–2	
Feb 18	UC Santa Barbara*	Packard Stadium • Tempe, AZ	W 8–2	14–2	
Feb 19	UC Santa Barbara*	Packard Stadium • Tempe, AZ	W 18–2	15–2	
Feb 19	UC Santa Barbara*	Packard Stadium • Tempe, AZ	W 11–1	16–2	
Feb 25	California	Packard Stadium • Tempe, AZ	W 9–0	17–2	1–0
Feb 26	California	Packard Stadium • Tempe, AZ	W 11–2	18–2	2–0
Feb 27	California	Packard Stadium • Tempe, AZ	L 4–5	18–3	2–1

March
Date	Opponent	Site/stadium	Score	Overall record	Pac-10 record
Mar 6	at Southern California	Dedeaux Field • Los Angeles, CA	L 3–7	18–4	2–2
Mar 6	at Southern California	Dedeaux Field • Los Angeles, CA	L 5–6	18–5	2–3
Mar 7	at Southern California	Dedeaux Field • Los Angeles, CA	W 3–2	19–5	3–3
Mar 8	Mesa (CO)*	Packard Stadium • Tempe, AZ	W 10–5	20–5	
Mar 11	UCLA	Packard Stadium • Tempe, AZ	W 4–3	21–5	4–3
Mar 12	UCLA	Packard Stadium • Tempe, AZ	L 6–7	21–6	4–4
Mar 13	UCLA	Packard Stadium • Tempe, AZ	L 4–5^{10}	21–7	4–5
Mar 15	at UNLV*	Rebel Field • Paradise, NV	W 16–8	22–7	
Mar 16	at UNLV*	Rebel Field • Paradise, NV	W 8–7	23–7	
Mar 18	at Texas*	Disch–Falk Field • Austin, TX	L 2–11	23–8	
Mar 19	at Texas*	Disch–Falk Field • Austin, TX	L 0–6	23–9	
Mar 25	at Stanford	Sunken Diamond • Stanford, CA	L 8–9	23–10	4–6
Mar 26	at Stanford	Sunken Diamond • Stanford, CA	L 5–6	23–11	4–7
Mar 28	at Stanford	Sunken Diamond • Stanford, CA	L 2–23	23–12	4–8
Mar 31	at California	Evans Diamond • Berkeley, CA	W 4–1	24–12	5–8

April
Date	Opponent	Site/stadium	Score	Overall record	Pac-10 record
Apr 1	at California	Evans Diamond • Berkeley, CA	W 4–2	25–12	6–8
Apr 2	at California	Evans Diamond • Berkeley, CA	L 2–7	25–13	6–9
Apr 5	Grand Canyon	Packard Stadium • Tempe, AZ	W 10–5	26–13	
Apr 7	at Arizona	Wildcat Field • Tucson, AZ	L 3–4	26–14	6–10
Apr 8	at Arizona	Wildcat Field • Tucson, AZ	W 14–7	27–14	7–10
Apr 9	at Arizona	Wildcat Field • Tucson, AZ	W 3–2	28–14	8–10
Apr 15	Southern California	Packard Stadium • Tempe, AZ	W 9–5	29–14	9–10
Apr 16	Southern California	Packard Stadium • Tempe, AZ	W 13–5	30–14	10–10
Apr 17	Southern California	Packard Stadium • Tempe, AZ	W 11–7	31–14	11–10
Apr 22	Stanford	Packard Stadium • Tempe, AZ	W 2–0	32–14	12–10
Apr 23	Stanford	Packard Stadium • Tempe, AZ	W 10–1	33–14	13–10
Apr 24	Stanford	Packard Stadium • Tempe, AZ	L 7–9	33–15	13–11
Apr 26	at Grand Canyon*	Brazell Stadium • Phoenix, AZ	L 6–8	33–16	
Apr 30	at UCLA	Jackie Robinson Stadium • Los Angeles, CA	W 6–4	34–16	14–11

May
Date	Opponent	Site/stadium	Score	Overall record	Pac-10 record
May 1	at UCLA	Jackie Robinson Stadium • Los Angeles, CA	W 5–2	35–16	15–11
May 1	at UCLA	Jackie Robinson Stadium • Los Angeles, CA	W 10–5	36–16	16–11
May 4	UNLV*	Packard Stadium • Tempe, AZ	L 7–8	36–17	
May 4	UNLV*	Packard Stadium • Tempe, AZ	W 15–2	37–17	
May 5	Grand Canyon*	Packard Stadium • Tempe, AZ	L 3–8	37–18	
May 11	Arizona	Packard Stadium • Tempe, AZ	W 9–5	38–18	17–11
May 12	Arizona	Packard Stadium • Tempe, AZ	L 2–5	38–19	17–12
May 13	Arizona	Packard Stadium • Tempe, AZ	L 3–5^{10}	38–20	17–13
May 14	at Hawaii*	Rainbow Stadium • Honolulu, HI	W 7–6	39–20	
May 15	at Hawaii*	Rainbow Stadium • Honolulu, HI	L 5–15	39–21	
May 16	at Hawaii*	Rainbow Stadium • Honolulu, HI	L 3–5	39–22	

Postseason

NCAA West II Regional
Date	Opponent	Site/stadium	Score	Overall record	Reg Record
May 27	BYU	Packard Stadium • Tempe, AZ	W 19–11	40–22	1–0
May 28	Cal State Fullerton	Packard Stadium • Tempe, AZ	W 8–0	41–22	2–0
May 29	Fresno State	Packard Stadium • Tempe, AZ	W 7–2	42–22	3–0

College World Series
Date	Opponent	Site/stadium	Score	Overall record	CWS record
June 4	Alabama	Johnny Rosenblatt Stadium • Omaha, NE	L 5–6^{11}	42–23	0–1
June 5	Maine	Johnny Rosenblatt Stadium • Omaha, NE	W 7–0	43–23	1–1
June 8	Oklahoma State	Johnny Rosenblatt Stadium • Omaha, NE	W 6–5	44–23	2–1
June 10	Alabama	Johnny Rosenblatt Stadium • Omaha, NE	L 0–6	44–24	2–2
