= 1983 Michigan Wolverines baseball team =

American college baseball season

1983 Michigan Wolverines baseball

Big Ten Conference East Division Big Ten Conference Tournament

College World Series, 3rd
- Conference: Big Ten Conference
- East

Ranking
- Coaches: No. 3
- CB: No. 4
- Record: 50–9 (13–2 Big Ten)
- Head coach: Bud Middaugh (4th season)
- Assistant coach: Danny Hall (4th season)
- MVP: Jeff Jacobson
- Home stadium: Ray Fisher Stadium

1983 Big Ten Conference baseball standings
	Conf.						Overall
Team	W		L		T	PCT	W		L		T	PCT
East
No. 4 Michigan ^{x}‍‍‡‍^{y}	13	–	2	–	0	.867	50	–	9	–	0	.847
Michigan State ‍‍‍	8	–	6	–	0	.571	22	–	32	–	0	.407
Indiana ‍‍‍	6	–	7	–	0	.462	26	–	21	–	0	.553
Purdue ‍‍‍	5	–	11	–	0	.313	21	–	34	–	0	.382
Ohio State ‍‍‍	3	–	9	–	0	.250	24	–	21	–	0	.533
West
Minnesota ^{x}‍‍‍	12	–	2	–	0	.857	27	–	21	–	0	.563
Iowa ‍‍‍	7	–	7	–	0	.500	32	–	31	–	0	.508
Northwestern ‍‍‍	6	–	9	–	0	.400	32	–	20	–	2	.611
Illinois ‍‍‍	6	–	8	–	0	.429	23	–	24	–	2	.490
Wisconsin ‍‍‍	6	–	10	–	0	.375	22	–	17	–	0	.564
x – Division champion ‡ – Tournament champion y – Invited to the NCAA tournament As of June 30, 1983; Rankings from Collegiate Baseball

The 1983 Michigan Wolverines baseball team represented the University of Michigan in the 1983 NCAA Division I baseball season. The head coach was Bud Middaugh, serving his 4th year. The Wolverines finished the season in 3rd place in the 1983 College World Series.

== Roster ==
1983 Michigan Wolverines baseball team
Players
Coaches

#	Pos.	Name	B/T	Height	Weight	Year	Home town
15		Rich Bair	/	—	—	Jr
6		C. J. Beshke	/	—	—
		Edgar Best	/	—	—
34	OF	Casey Close	R/R	6 ft 1 in (1.85 m)	185 lb (84 kg)	Fr	Columbus, Ohio
23		John Codere	/	—	—	Fr
		Mark Dadabbo	/	—	—
	OF	Dan Disher	R/R	6 ft 2 in (1.88 m)	190 lb (86 kg)	Fr
14		Fred Erdmann	/	—	—	Sr
8		Chuck Froning	/	—	—	Jr
21		Chris Gust	/	—	—	Fr
32		Kenneth Hayward	/	—	—	So
22	INF	Jeffery Jacobson	R/R	6 ft 1 in (1.85 m)	185 lb (84 kg)	Sr
19	RHP	Scott Kamieniecki	R/R	6 ft 0 in (1.83 m)	195 lb (88 kg)	Fr	Mount Clemens, Michigan
29		Timothy Karazim	/	—	—
		Derek Kerr	/	—	—	Fr
20	RHP	Dave Kopf	/R	6 ft 5 in (1.96 m)	210 lb (95 kg)		Royal Oak, Michigan
16	INF	Barry Larkin	R/R	6 ft 0 in (1.83 m)	185 lb (84 kg)	Fr	Cincinnati, Ohio
		Jeffery Minick	/	—	—	So
9		James Piper	/	—	—	Fr
7	INF	Chris Sabo	R/R	5 ft 11 in (1.8 m)	185 lb (84 kg)	Jr	Detroit, Michigan
10		Eric Sanders	/	—	—	Fr
18		Bill Shuta	/	—	—	Jr
	OF	Dale Sklar	/	—	—
26	RHP	Richard Stoll	R/R	5 ft 11 in (1.8 m)	182 lb (83 kg)
3		Daniel Sygar	/	—	—	Sr
	INF	Michael Watters	L/R	6 ft 1 in (1.85 m)	185 lb (84 kg)
24	LHP	Gary Wayne	L/L	6 ft 3 in (1.91 m)	185 lb (84 kg)	Jr	Dearborn, Michigan
31		Kurt Zimmerman	/	—	—	Fr

Head coach

27 Bud Middaugh

Assistant coach(es)

17 Danny Hall
Gary Murphy
John Young

Legend

- (C) Team captain
- (S) Suspended
- (I) Ineligible
- Injured
- Current redshirt

== Schedule ==
1983 Michigan Wolverines baseball game log
Regular season
March (11–1)

#	Date	Opponent	Site/stadium	Score	Overall record	Big Ten record
1	March 11	at Central Florida	Unknown • Orlando, Florida	13–3	1–0	0–0
2	March 11	at Central Florida	Unknown • Orlando, Florida	13–4	2–0	0–0
3	March 12	vs James Madison	Unknown • DeLand, Florida	4–1	3–0	0–0
4	March 12	vs Columbia	Unknown • DeLand, Florida	6–2	4–0	0–0
5	March 13	vs Central Florida	Unknown • DeLand, Florida	10–4	5–0	0–0
6	March 13	vs Yale	Unknown • DeLand, Florida	7–6	6–0	0–0
7	March 14	vs Rollins	Unknown • DeLand, Florida	5–4	7–0	0–0
8	March 17	vs Virginia	Unknown • Unknown	6–2	8–0	0–0
9	March 18	vs Yale	Unknown • Unknown	7–3	9–0	0–0
10	March 18	vs Virginia	Unknown • Unknown	6–3	10–0	0–0
11	March 18	vs Stetson	Unknown • Unknown	6–10	10–1	0–0
12	March 19	vs Rollins	Unknown • Unknown	6–5	11–1	0–0

April (16–5)

#	Date	Opponent	Site/stadium	Score	Overall record	Big Ten record
13	April 1	at Miami (OH)	Unknown • Oxford, Ohio	7–5	12–1	0–0
14	April 2	at Miami (OH)	Unknown • Oxford, Ohio	7–3	13–1	0–0
15	April 5	Aquinas	Ray Fisher Stadium • Ann Arbor, Michigan	3–2	14–1	0–0
16	April 5	Aquinas	Ray Fisher Stadium • Ann Arbor, Michigan	10–4	15–1	0–0
17	April 6	vs Western Michigan	Unknown • Unknown, Michigan	3–2	16–1	0–0
18	April 6	vs Western Michigan	Unknown • Unknown, Michigan	3–1	17–1	0–0
19	April 9	vs Eastern Michigan	Unknown • Unknown, Michigan	1–5	17–2	0–0
20	April 12	vs Wayne State	Unknown • Unknown, Michigan	7–3	18–2	0–0
21	April 13	vs Western Michigan	Unknown • Unknown, Michigan	6–2	19–2	0–0
22	April 13	vs Western Michigan	Unknown • Unknown, Michigan	1–3	19–3	0–0
23	April 16	Indiana	Ray Fisher Stadium • Ann Arbor, Michigan	8–1	20–3	1–0
24	April 16	Indiana	Ray Fisher Stadium • Ann Arbor, Michigan	6–2	21–3	2–0
25	April 18	Indiana	Ray Fisher Stadium • Ann Arbor, Michigan	1–0	22–3	3–0
26	April 19	vs Toledo	Unknown • Unknown	2–3	22–4	3–0
27	April 19	vs Toledo	Unknown • Unknown	0–5	22–5	3–0
28	April 21	vs Cleveland State	Unknown • Unknown	7–1	23–5	3–0
29	April 21	vs Cleveland State	Unknown • Unknown	9–0	24–5	3–0
30	April 24	vs Ferris State	Unknown • Unknown, Michigan	11–4	25–5	3–0
31	April 24	vs Ferris State	Unknown • Unknown, Michigan	19–1	26–5	3–0
32	April 30	at Ohio State	Trautman Field • Columbus, Ohio	10–3	27–5	4–0
33	April 30	at Ohio State	Trautman Field • Columbus, Ohio	0–1	27–6	4–1

May (15–1)

#	Date	Opponent	Site/stadium	Score	Overall record	Big Ten record
34	May 1	at Ohio State	Trautman Field • Columbus, Ohio	11–2	28–6	5–1
35	May 2	at Ohio State	Trautman Field • Columbus, Ohio	17–11	29–6	6–1
36	May 5	Adrian	Ray Fisher Stadium • Ann Arbor, Michigan	7–0	30–6	6–1
37	May 5	Adrian	Ray Fisher Stadium • Ann Arbor, Michigan	8–0	31–6	6–1
38	May 7	at Michigan State	John H. Kobs Field • East Lansing, Michigan	11–9	32–6	7–1
39	May 7	at Michigan State	John H. Kobs Field • East Lansing, Michigan	13–5	33–6	8–1
40	May 8	Michigan State	Ray Fisher Stadium • Ann Arbor, Michigan	10–0	34–6	9–1
41	May 8	Michigan State	Ray Fisher Stadium • Ann Arbor, Michigan	6–3	35–6	10–1
42	May 10	vs Wayne State	Unknown • Unknown, Michigan	7–2	36–6	10–1
43	May 10	vs Wayne State	Unknown • Unknown, Michigan	13–4	37–6	10–1
44	May 11	vs Eastern Michigan	Unknown • Unknown, Michigan	10–6	38–6	10–1
45	May 11	vs Eastern Michigan	Unknown • Unknown, Michigan	14–2	39–6	10–1
46	May 14	Purdue	Ray Fisher Stadium • Ann Arbor, Michigan	2–3	39–7	10–2
47	May 14	Purdue	Ray Fisher Stadium • Ann Arbor, Michigan	11–6	40–7	11–2
48	May 15	Purdue	Ray Fisher Stadium • Ann Arbor, Michigan	2–0	41–7	12–2
49	May 15	Purdue	Ray Fisher Stadium • Ann Arbor, Michigan	5–4	42–7	13–2

Postseason
Big Ten Tournament (3–0)

#	Date	Opponent	Site/stadium	Score	Overall record	Big Ten record
50	May 20	Iowa	Ray Fisher Stadium • Ann Arbor, Michigan	1–0	43–7	13–2
51	May 21	Minnesota	Ray Fisher Stadium • Ann Arbor, Michigan	10–9	44–7	13–3
52	May 22	Iowa	Ray Fisher Stadium • Ann Arbor, Michigan	12–3	45–7	13–3

Mideast Regional (3–0)

#	Date	Opponent	Site/stadium	Score	Overall record	Big Ten record
53	May 27	Morehead State	Ray Fisher Stadium • Ann Arbor, Michigan	4–3	46–7	13–3
54	May 28	Miami (OH)	Ray Fisher Stadium • Ann Arbor, Michigan	6–4	47–7	13–3
55	May 29	Morehead State	Ray Fisher Stadium • Ann Arbor, Michigan	10–1	48–7	13–3

1983 College World Series (0–2)

#	Date	Opponent	Site/stadium	Score	Overall record	Big Ten record
56	June 4	vs Maine	Johnny Rosenblatt Stadium • Omaha, Nebraska	6–5	49–7	13–3
57	June 7	vs Alabama	Johnny Rosenblatt Stadium • Omaha, Nebraska	5–6	49–8	13–3
58	June 8	vs Stanford	Johnny Rosenblatt Stadium • Omaha, Nebraska	11–4	50–8	13–3
59	June 10	vs Texas	Johnny Rosenblatt Stadium • Omaha, Nebraska	2–4	50–9	13–3

== Awards and honors ==
Rich Bair

- First Team All-Big Ten

Fred Erdmann

- First Team All-Big Ten
- Big Ten Batting Champion

Barry Larkin

- Baseball America First Team All-Freshman

Chris Sabo

- Baseball America First Team All-American
- Sporting News First Team All-American
- College World Series All-Tournament Team

Dale Sklar

- College World Series All-Tournament Team

Rich Stoll

- Baseball America Second Team All-American
- American Baseball Coaches Association Second Team All-American
- Big Ten Player of the Year
- First Team All-Big Ten
