= 1983 Stanford Cardinal baseball team =

American college baseball season

1983 Stanford Cardinal baseball

Pacific-10 Conference South Division champions West I Regional champions

College World Series, T-5th
- Conference: Pacific 10 Conference

Ranking
- Coaches: No. 5
- CB: No. 6
- Record: 42–17–1 (20–10 Pac-10)
- Head coach: Mark Marquess (7th season)
- Home stadium: Sunken Diamond

1983 Pacific-10 Conference baseball standings
	Conf.						Overall
Team	W		L		T	PCT	W		L		T	PCT
Northern
Oregon State ^{x}‍‍‍	17	–	7	–	0	.708	27	–	15	–	0	.643
Washington State ‍‍‍	16	–	8	–	0	.667	39	–	17	–	1	.693
Washington ‍‍‍	12	–	11	–	0	.522	25	–	16	–	1	.607
Portland State ‍‍‍	11	–	12	–	0	.478	32	–	18	–	0	.640
Eastern Washington ‍‍‍	11	–	13	–	0	.458	25	–	17	–	0	.595
Portland ‍‍‍	10	–	14	–	0	.417	23	–	21	–	1	.522
Gonzaga ‍‍‍	6	–	18	–	0	.250	17	–	34	–	0	.333
Southern
No. 6 Stanford ^{x}‍‍‍^{y}	20	–	10	–	0	.667	42	–	17	–	1	.708
No. 3 Arizona State ‍‍‍^{y}	17	–	13	–	0	.567	44	–	24	–	0	.647
Southern California ‍‍‍	17	–	13	–	0	.567	32	–	23	–	1	.580
Arizona ‍‍‍	14	–	15	–	0	.483	25	–	31	–	0	.446
UCLA ‍‍‍	12	–	18	–	0	.400	28	–	24	–	1	.538
California ‍‍‍	9	–	20	–	0	.310	23	–	37	–	0	.383
x – Division champion y – Invited to the NCAA tournament As of June 30, 1983; Rankings from Collegiate Baseball

The 1983 Stanford Cardinal baseball team represented Stanford University in the 1983 NCAA Division I baseball season. The Cardinal played their home games at Sunken Diamond. The team was coached by Mark Marquess in his 7th year at Stanford.

The Cardinal won the Pacific-10 Conference South Division and the West I Regional to advanced to the College World Series, where they were defeated by the Michigan Wolverines.

== Roster ==
1983 Stanford Cardinal baseball team
Players
Coaches

#	Pos.	Name	B/T	Height	Weight	Year	Home town
	INF	Mike Aldrete	/	—	—	Sr
	P	Jeff Ballard	/	—	—	So
		Bland	/	—	—
		Chris Britt	/	—	—
		Darrell Cass	/	—	—
	P	Steve Cottrell	/	—	—	So
	INF	Mark Davis	/	—	—	So
		Mike DeBenon	/	—	—	Fr
	OF	Mike Dotterer	/	—	—	Sr
		Ken Green	/	—	—	Fr
	P	Doug Gwaltney	/	—	—
	INF	Eric Hardgrave	/	—	—	Sr
	P	David Harris	/	—	—
		Walt Harris	/	—	—	Fr
	P	Kevin Kunkel	/	—	—	Fr
		Fred Laningham	/	—	—
		Greg Lorenzetti	/	—	—
		Rick Lundblade	/	—	—	So
		McNally	/	—	—
	P	Brian Myers	/	—	—	So
	P	Park	/	—	—
	P	Pierce	/	—	—
	P	John Radtke	/	—	—
	INF	Vince Sakowski	/	—	—
		Lyle Smith	/	—	—
		Pete Stanicek	/	—	—	So
		Stark	/	—	—
	INF	John Verducci	/	—	—	So
		Warner	/	—	—
		Warren	/	—	—

Head coach

Mark Marquess

Assistant coach(es)

Legend

- (C) Team captain
- (S) Suspended
- (I) Ineligible
- Injured
- Current redshirt

Roster
Last update: December 25, 2020

== Schedule ==
1983 Stanford Cardinal baseball game log
Regular season
January (2–0)

#	Date	Opponent	Site/stadium	Score	Overall record	Pac-10 record
1	January 30	San Francisco	Sunken Diamond • Stanford, California	17–10	1–0	–
2	January 31	San Francisco	Sunken Diamond • Stanford, California	28–5	2–0	–

February (11–4–1)

#	Date	Opponent	Site/stadium	Score	Overall record	Pac-10 record
3	February 1	at Cal State Hayward	Unknown • Hayward, California	8–8	2–0–1	–
4	February 2	San Francisco	Sunken Diamond • Stanford, California	6–3	3–0–1	–
5	February 4	at Cal State Fullerton	Titan Field • Fullerton, California	5–9	3–1–1	–
6	February 6	at Cal State Fullerton	Titan Field • Fullerton, California	2–3	3–2–1	–
7	February 6	at Cal State Fullerton	Titan Field • Fullerton, California	5–8	3–3–1	–
8	February 11	at San Jose State	San Jose Municipal Stadium • San Jose, California	2–3	3–4–1	–
9	February 14	San Jose State	Sunken Diamond • Stanford, California	9–2	4–4–1	–
10	February 14	San Jose State	Sunken Diamond • Stanford, California	15–11	5–4–1	–
11	February 15	Stanislaus State	Sunken Diamond • Stanford, California	4–1	6–4–1	–
12	February 19	Pacific	Sunken Diamond • Stanford, California	8–3	7–4–1	–
13	February 19	Pacific	Sunken Diamond • Stanford, California	7–6	8–4–1	–
14	February 20	at Pacific	Billy Hebert Field • Stockton, California	13–1	9–4–1	–
15	February 21	Santa Clara	Sunken Diamond • Stanford, California	4–0	10–4–1	–
16	February 22	Fresno State	Sunken Diamond • Stanford, California	9–8	11–4–1	–
17	February 25	at UCLA	Jackie Robinson Stadium • Los Angeles, California	13–5	12–4–1	1–0
18	February 29	at UCLA	Jackie Robinson Stadium • Los Angeles, California	7–1	13–4–1	1–0

March (10–1)

#	Date	Opponent	Site/stadium	Score	Overall record	Pac-10 record
19	March 4	at Arizona	Jerry Kindall Field at Frank Sancet Stadium • Tucson, Arizona	3–4	13–5–1	1–1
20	March 5	at Arizona	Jerry Kindall Field at Frank Sancet Stadium • Tucson, Arizona	10–9	14–5–1	2–1
21	March 6	at Arizona	Jerry Kindall Field at Frank Sancet Stadium • Tucson, Arizona	15–6	15–5–1	3–1
22	March 8	at UC Davis	Unknown • Davis, California	16–6	16–5–1	3–1
23	March 19	Southern California	Sunken Diamond • Stanford, California	8–4	17–5–1	4–1
24	March 25	Arizona State	Sunken Diamond • Stanford, California	9–8	18–5–1	5–1
25	March 26	Arizona State	Sunken Diamond • Stanford, California	6–5	19–5–1	6–1
26	March 26	Arizona State	Sunken Diamond • Stanford, California	6–5	20–5–1	7–1
27	March 28	Arizona State	Sunken Diamond • Stanford, California	23–2	21–5–1	8–1
28	March 29	Nevada	Sunken Diamond • Stanford, California	7–1	22–5–1	8–1
29	March 30	Santa Clara	Sunken Diamond • Stanford, California	11–6	23–5–1	8–1

April (9–6)

#	Date	Opponent	Site/stadium	Score	Overall record	Pac-10 record
30	April 1	at San Jose State	San Jose Municipal Stadium • San Jose, California	9–2	24–5–1	8–1
31	April 2	Saint Mary's	Sunken Diamond • Stanford, California	7–2	25–5–1	8–1
32	April 4	at Santa Clara	Buck Shaw Stadium • Santa Clara, California	4–7	25–6–1	8–1
33	April 5	Sonoma State	Sunken Diamond • Stanford, California	14–3	26–6–1	8–1
34	April 8	at California	Evans Diamond • Berkeley, California	4–7	26–7–1	8–2
35	April 9	California	Sunken Diamond • Stanford, California	5–4	27–7–1	9–2
36	April 10	at California	Evans Diamond • Berkeley, California	2–3	27–8–1	9–3
37	April 15	UCLA	Sunken Diamond • Stanford, California	13–8	28–8–1	10–3
38	April 15	UCLA	Sunken Diamond • Stanford, California	11–12	28–9–1	10–4
39	April 16	UCLA	Sunken Diamond • Stanford, California	10–4	29–9–1	11–4
40	April 17	UCLA	Sunken Diamond • Stanford, California	10–3	30–9–1	12–4
41	April 18	UCLA	Sunken Diamond • Stanford, California	4–3	31–9–1	13–4
42	April 22	at Arizona State	Packard Stadium • Tempe, Arizona	0–2	31–10–1	13–5
43	April 23	at Arizona State	Packard Stadium • Tempe, Arizona	1–10	31–11–1	13–6
44	April 24	at Arizona State	Packard Stadium • Tempe, Arizona	9–7	32–11–1	14–6

May (6–4)

#	Date	Opponent	Site/stadium	Score	Overall record	Pac-10 record
45	May 1	Arizona	Sunken Diamond • Stanford, California	2–4	32–12–1	14–7
46	May 1	Southern California	Sunken Diamond • Stanford, California	1–3	32–13–1	14–8
47	May 2	Arizona	Sunken Diamond • Stanford, California	5–3	33–13–1	15–8
48	May 6	at Southern California	Dedeaux Field • Los Angeles, California	12–5	34–13–1	16–8
49	May 7	at Southern California	Dedeaux Field • Los Angeles, California	2–13	34–14–1	16–9
50	May 7	at Southern California	Dedeaux Field • Los Angeles, California	6–8	34–15–1	16–10
51	May 8	at Southern California	Dedeaux Field • Los Angeles, California	12–5	35–15–1	17–10
52	May 13	California	Sunken Diamond • Stanford, California	9–2	36–15–1	18–10
53	May 14	at California	Evans Diamond • Berkeley, California	9–1	37–15–1	19–10
54	May 15	California	Sunken Diamond • Stanford, California	6–3	38–15–1	20–10

Postseason
NCAA West I Regional (3–0)

#	Date	Opponent	Site/stadium	Score	Overall record	Pac-10 record
55	May 27	Oregon State	Sunken Diamond • Stanford, California	14–0	39–15–1	20–10
56	May 28	San Diego State	Sunken Diamond • Stanford, California	4–3	40–15–1	20–10
57	May 29	UC Santa Barbara	Sunken Diamond • Stanford, California	11–5	41–15–1	20–10

College World Series (1–2)

#	Date	Opponent	Site/stadium	Score	Overall record	Pac-10 record
58	June 3	vs Oklahoma State	Johnny Rosenblatt Stadium • Omaha, Nebraska	1–3	41–16–1	20–10
59	June 5	vs James Madison	Johnny Rosenblatt Stadium • Omaha, Nebraska	3–1	42–16–1	20–10
60	June 8	vs Michigan	Johnny Rosenblatt Stadium • Omaha, Nebraska	4–11	42–17–1	20–10

== Awards and honors ==
Mike Aldrete

- First Team All-Pac-10

Jeff Ballard

- First Team All-Pac-10

Eric Hardgrave

- Pac-10 Conference South Division Player of the Year
- First Team All-Pac-10
- First Team All-American American Baseball Coaches Association

Vince Sakowski

- First Team All-Pac-10
