= Barry Shollenberger =

American baseball coach

Biographical details
- Born: 1941; Pennsylvania, U.S.

Playing career
- 1962: Waterloo Hawks
- 1963: Rocky Mount Leafs
- 1965: Tampa Tarpons
- Position: Pitcher

Coaching career (HC unless noted)
- 1976: Middle Georgia Junior College
- 1977–1979: Western Kentucky
- 1980–1994: Alabama

Accomplishments and honors

Awards
- Baseball America College Coach of the Year (1983)

Barry John Shollenberger (born 1941) is an American former baseball and football coach. During his career, Shollenberger worked in both sports while with Tampa Bay Technical High School from 1965 to 1973. In college baseball, Shollenberger started out with the Alabama Crimson Tide baseball team as an assistant coach in 1974. He then became the head coach for Middle Georgia Junior College in 1976. As the head coach for Western Kentucky University from 1977 to 1979, Shollenberger had 77 wins, 64 losses and 3 ties.

With Alabama from 1980 to 1994, Shollenberger amassed 487 wins, 334 losses and 1 tie. During this time period, Shollenberger appeared at the championship game during the 1983 College World Series and was the Baseball America College Coach of the Year that year. Apart from coaching, Shollenberger was a minor league pitcher from 1961 to 1965. While with the Waterloo Hawks, Shollenberger received the Midwest League Top MLB Prospect Award in 1962.

== Early life and education ==
Shollenberger was born in Pennsylvania in 1941. During the 1950s, Shollenberger attended Reading High School and began his baseball career there. With the Reading Red Knights, Shollenberger was a pitcher in the East Penn League from 1957 to 1959.

At the end of the 1950s, Shollenberger was part of the American Legion Baseball league with Berks County and Pulaski. While in the American Legion, Shollenberger pitched in the 1959 All-Star game for Pennsylvanian teams and was named one of the Most Valuable Players after the event.

In 1965, he earned a Bachelor of Arts in 1965 from Moravian College. He later attended the University of Tampa in the 1960s as a graduate student. In the 1970s, Shollenberger completed a Master of Arts at Western Kentucky University and a Doctor of Education at the University of Alabama.

== Career ==
=== Playing career ===
In 1960, Shollenberger joined the Mitchell Kernels as part of the Basin League. For Mitchell, Shollenberger had experience as a left fielder and primarily held the position of relief pitcher. In 1961, Shollenberger continued his semi-professional in the Basin League when he became part of the Sturgis Titans. While with Sturgis, Shollenberger was a pitcher while also serving as a one-game replacement umpire. During these two years, Shollenberger pitched for Moravian College. With Moravian, Shollenberger and the team won the Middle Atlantic Conference in 1960.

Shollenberger began his minor league baseball career as a pitcher in 1961. He started with the Waterloo Hawks before moving to the Rocky Mount Leafs and Tampa Tarpons in the 1960s. He was selected by the Cincinnati Reds in the First-Year Player Draft on November 26, 1962 after going 16–5 with 226 strikeouts in 185 innings with the Hawks. After tendinopathy forced Shollenberger to end his pitching career in 1965, he had a career total of seventeen wins and fifteen losses.

=== Coaching career ===
At Brewster Technical High School in 1965, Shollenberger worked for their baseball team as an assistant coach. The following year, Shollenberger began coaching the baseball team at Brewster. In 1967, he won the Tampa Bay Conference Baseball Tournament with Brewster. In additional coaching positions, Shollenberger was in charge of the backfield for the football team and led a basketball team during the 1960s.

In 1969, Brewster Tech was succeeded by Tampa Bay Vocational-Technical School. With Tampa Bay Tech's football team, Shollenberger was in charge of the defensive team and worked as an assistant coach by the end of 1970. That year, he was chosen to become their football coach. By 1971, he had become their baseball coach. The following year, his football team were one of the winners of the Tampa Bay Conference. In June 1973, Shollenberger ended his coaching positions with Tampa Bay Tech.

In 1974, Shollenberger went to the University of Alabama to become an assistant baseball coach. He stayed as assistant coach until 1976 when he resumed his head coach career with the Middle Georgia Junior College baseball team. After the 1976 season, Shollenberger obtained a head baseball coach position with Western Kentucky University in 1977 and stayed as their head coach until 1979. With the Western Kentucky Hilltoppers baseball team, Shollenberger reached the final of the 1978 playoffs held by the Ohio Valley Conference. He had 77 wins, 64 losses and 3 ties with Western Kentucky.

Shollenberger joined the Alabama Crimson Tide baseball team as their baseball coach in June 1979. He made his debut as Alabama's coach in February 1980. With Alabama, Shollenberger and his team won the 1983 Southeastern Conference baseball tournament. That year, Shollenberger's players appeared in the championship game of the 1983 College World Series. Shollenberger remained with Alabama until he left the team in 1994. Before leaving the team, Shollenberger had an overall record of 487 wins, 334 losses and 1 tie.

== Awards ==
While with the Hawks, Shollenberger received the Midwest League Top MLB Prospect Award in 1962. In 1978, he was the Coach of the Year for the Ohio Valley Conference while at Western Kentucky. With Alabama, Shollenberger was the 1983 Southeastern Conference Baseball Coach of the Year. That year, he was the Baseball America College Coach of the Year. He also became part of a hall of fame for Moravian.
