= Jeff Hearron =

American baseball player (born 1961)

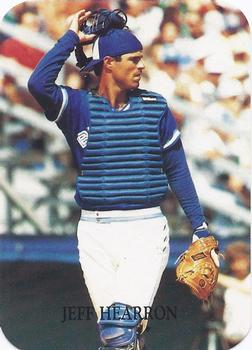
- Catcher
- Born: November 19, 1961 (age 64); Long Beach, California
- Batted: Right Threw: Right

MLB debut
- August 25, 1985, for the Toronto Blue Jays

Last MLB appearance
- September 28, 1986, for the Toronto Blue Jays

MLB statistics
- Batting average: .200
- Home runs: 0
- Runs batted in: 4
- Stats at Baseball Reference

Teams
- Toronto Blue Jays (1985–1986)

Jeffrey Vernon Hearron (born November 19, 1961) is an American former professional baseball catcher. Hearron played in Major League Baseball (MLB) for the Toronto Blue Jays in 1985 and 1986.

He was drafted by the Blue Jays in the fourth round of the 1983 Major League Baseball draft.
