= 1983 NCAA Division I baseball rankings =

1983 NCAA Division I baseball season

Tournament

College World Series
- Champions: Texas
- Runners-up: Alabama
- MOP: Calvin Schiraldi (Texas)

Seasons
- ← 1982 1984 →

The following polls make up the 1983 NCAA Division I baseball rankings. Baseball America began publishing its poll of the top 20 teams in college baseball in 1981. Collegiate Baseball Newspaper published its first human poll of the top 20 teams in college baseball in 1957, and expanded to rank the top 30 teams in 1961.

== Baseball America ==
Currently, only the final poll from the 1983 season is available.

Rank	Team
1	Texas
2	Alabama
3	Michigan
4	Oklahoma State
5	Stanford
6	BYU
7	Florida State
8	San Diego State
9	Arizona State
10	Oral Roberts
11	Miami (FL)
12	Fresno State
13	Mississippi State
14	UC Santa Barbara
15	Cal State Fullerton
16	Wichita State
17	North Carolina
18	Tulane
19	Old Dominion
20	Maine

== Collegiate Baseball ==
Currently, only the final poll from the 1983 season is available.

Rank	Team
1	Texas
2	Alabama
3	Arizona State
4	Michigan
5	Oklahoma State
6	Stanford
7	Maine
8	James Madison
9	Oral Roberts
10	Miami (FL)
11	Fresno State
12	Mississippi State
13	UC Santa Barbara
14	Delaware
15	Florida State
16	Harvard
17	BYU
18	San Diego State
19	Texas–Pan American
20	Cal State Fullerton
21	The Citadel
22	Wichita State
23	Tulane
24	Arkansas
25	North Carolina
26	Oklahoma
27	Morehead State
28	South Carolina
29	Miami (OH)
30	Indiana State
