= 1983 NCAA Division I baseball tournament =

- Season: 1983
- Teams: 36
- Finals site: Johnny Rosenblatt Stadium; Omaha, Nebraska
- Champions: Texas (4th title)
- Runner-up: Alabama (2nd CWS Appearance)
- Winning coach: Cliff Gustafson (2nd title)
- MOP: Calvin Schiraldi (Texas)

The 1983 NCAA Division I baseball tournament was played at the end of the 1983 NCAA Division I baseball season to determine the national champion of college baseball. The tournament concluded with eight teams competing in the College World Series, a double-elimination tournament in its thirty seventh year. Eight regional competitions were held to determine the participants in the final event. Six regions held a four team, double-elimination tournament while two regions included six teams, resulting in 36 teams participating in the tournament at the conclusion of their regular season, and in some cases, after a conference tournament. The thirty-seventh tournament's champion was Texas, coached by Cliff Gustafson. The Most Outstanding Player was Calvin Schiraldi of Texas.

== National seeds ==
Bold indicates CWS participant.

- BYU
- Florida State
- **Michigan**
- **Stanford**
- **Texas**

== Regionals ==
The opening rounds of the tournament were played at eight regional sites across the country, six consisting of four teams and two of six teams. The winners of each Regional advanced to the College World Series.

Bold indicates winner.

=== Central Regional at Austin, TX ===
First round
1	**Texas–Pan American**	**5**
6	Grambling State	0
2	**Mississippi State**	**4**
5	Tulane	2
3	**Texas**	**15**
4	Louisiana–Monroe	0

Second round
**Texas–Pan American**	**9**
Louisiana–Monroe	8
**Mississippi State**	**6**
Texas	2
Grambling State	7
**Tulane**	**8**^{10}

Third round
**Mississippi State**	**7**
Texas–Pan American	5
**Texas**	**7**
Tulane	5

Semifinals
Texas–Pan American	1
**Texas**	**6**

Final
Mississippi State	0	3
**Texas**	**7**	**12**

=== East Regional at Chapel Hill, NC ===
First round
1	**James Madison**	**9**
6	South Carolina	0
2	**The Citadel**	**14**
5	Delaware	5
3	**North Carolina**	**11**
4	William & Mary	0

Second round
**James Madison**	**13**
William & Mary	8
**The Citadel**	**5**
North Carolina	3
South Carolina	11
**Delaware**	**12**^{11}

Third round
**James Madison**	**5**
The Citadel	2
North Carolina	5
**Delaware**	**6**

Semifinals
The Citadel	1
**Delaware**	**7**

Final
**James Madison**	**6**	—
Delaware	5	—

=== Mideast Regional at Ann Arbor, MI ===
Upper round 1
**Michigan**	**4**
Morehead State	3
**Miami (OH)**	**7**
Indiana State	4
Lower round 1
Indiana State	2
**Morehead State**	**7**

Upper final
**Michigan**	**6**
Miami (OH)	4
Lower final
**Morehead State**	**9**
Miami (OH)	7

Final
**Michigan**	**10**	—
Morehead State	1	—

=== Midwest Regional at Stillwater, OK ===
Upper round 1
**Oral Roberts**	**7**
Arkansas	6
**Oklahoma State**	**9**
Wichita State	2
Lower round 1
Arkansas	3
**Wichita State**	**6**

Upper final
Oral Roberts	8
**Oklahoma State**	**9**
Lower final
**Oral Roberts**	**6**
Wichita State	5

Final
**Oklahoma State**	**10**	—
Oral Roberts	9	—

=== Northeast Regional at Orono, ME ===
Upper round 1
**Harvard**	**2**
Temple	1
**Maine**	**8**
NYIT	2
Lower round 1
**Temple**	**10**
NYIT	5

Upper final
Harvard	2
**Maine**	**6**
Lower final
**Harvard**	**3**
Temple	2

Final
**Maine**	4	—
Harvard	3	—

=== South Regional at Tallahassee, FL ===
Upper round 1
**Alabama**	**6**
Miami (FL)	4
**Florida State**	**8**
South Alabama	2
Lower round 1
South Alabama	5
**Miami (FL)**	**14**

Upper final
**Alabama**	**7**
Florida State	5
Lower final
**Miami (FL)**	**10**
Florida State	5

Final
**Alabama**	**11**	—
Miami (FL)	9	—

=== West I Regional at Stanford, CA ===
Upper round 1
**San Diego State**	**7**
UC Santa Barbara	5
**Stanford**	**14**
Oregon State	0
Lower round 1
Oregon State	3
**UC Santa Barbara**	**7**

Upper final
San Diego State	3
**Stanford**	**4**^{11}
Lower final
**UC Santa Barbara**	**9**
San Diego State	5

Final
**Stanford**	**11**	—
UC Santa Barbara	5	—

=== West II Regional at Tempe, AZ ===
Upper round 1
**Cal State Fullerton**	**7**
Fresno State	5
**Arizona State**	**19**
BYU	11
Lower round 1
BYU	6
**Fresno State**	**13**

Upper final
Cal State Fullerton	0
**Arizona State**	**8**
Lower final
**Fresno State**	**6**
Cal State Fullerton	3

Final
**Arizona State**	**7**	—
Fresno State	2	—

== College World Series ==
=== Participants ===
School	Conference	Record (conference)	Head coach	CWS appearances	CWS best finish	CWS record
Alabama	SEC	43–9 (14–7)	Barry Shollenberger	1 (last: 1950)	6th (1950)	1–2
Arizona State	Pac-10	42–22 (17–13)	Jim Brock	11 (last: 1981)	1st (1965, 1967, 1969, 1977, 1981)	42–17
James Madison	Eastern Collegiate	37–11 (n/a)	Brad Babcock	0 (last: none)	none	0–0
Maine	Eastern Collegiate	29–14 (n/a)	John Winkin	4 (last: 1982)	3rd (1964, 1982)	7–8
Michigan	Big 10	48–7 (13–2)	Bud Middaugh	5 (last: 1981)	1st (1953, 1962)	10–7
Oklahoma State	Big 8	47–14 (11–3)	Gary Ward	10 (last: 1982)	1st (1959)	23–19
Stanford	Pac-10	40–15–1 (20–10)	Mark Marquess	3 (last: 1982)	3rd (1967)	5–6
Texas	SWC	61–14 (18–3)	Cliff Gustafson	20 (last: 1982)	1st (1949, 1950, 1975)	43–36

=== Results ===
==== Bracket ====
Upper round 1
**Texas**	**12**
James Madison	0
**Oklahoma State**	**3**
Stanford	1
**Michigan**	**6**
Maine	5
**Alabama**	**6**^{11}
Arizona State	5

Upper round 2
**Texas**	**6**^{11}
Oklahoma State	5
Michigan	5
**Alabama**	**6**
Lower round 1
James Madison	1
**Stanford**	**3**
Maine	0
**Arizona State**	**7**

Upper final
**Texas**	**6**^{10}
Alabama	4
Lower round 2
**Michigan**	**11**
Stanford	4
Oklahoma State	5
**Arizona State**	**6**

Semifinals
**Texas**	**4**
Michigan	2
**Alabama**	**6**
Arizona State	0

Final
**Texas**	**4**
Alabama	3

==== Game results ====
Date	Game	Winner	Score	Loser	Notes
June 3	Game 1	Texas	12–0	James Madison	
June 3	Game 2	Oklahoma State	3–1	Stanford	
June 4	Game 3	Michigan	6–5	Maine	
June 4	Game 4	Alabama	6–5 (11 innings)	Arizona State	
June 5	Game 5	Stanford	3–1	James Madison	James Madison eliminated
June 5	Game 6	Arizona State	7–0	Maine	Maine eliminated
June 6	Game 7	Texas	6–5 (11 innings)	Oklahoma State	
June 7	Game 8	Alabama	6–5	Michigan	
June 8	Game 9	Arizona State	6–5	Oklahoma State	Oklahoma State eliminated
June 8	Game 10	Michigan	11–4	Stanford	Stanford eliminated
June 9	Game 11	Texas	6–4 (10 innings)	Alabama	
June 10	Game 12	Alabama	6–0	Arizona State	Arizona State eliminated
June 10	Game 13	Texas	4–2	Michigan	Michigan eliminated
June 11	Final	Texas	4–3	Alabama	Texas wins CWS

- Texas was the last school to go undefeated in the CWS under the true double-elimination format, which was used from 1950 through 1987. No CWS team would go undefeated again until LSU in 1991.

=== All-Tournament Team ===
The following players were members of the All-Tournament Team.

Position	Player	School
P	Tim Meacham	Alabama
P	**Calvin Schiraldi (MOP)**	Texas
C	Jeff Hearron	Texas
1B	Dave Magadan	Alabama
2B	Billy Bates	Texas
3B	Chris Sabo	Michigan
SS	Mike Brumley	Texas
OF	Barry Bonds	Arizona State
OF	Tim Knapp	Oklahoma State
OF	Dale Sklar	Michigan
DH	Pete Incaviglia	Oklahoma State

=== Notable players ===
- Alabama: Dave Magadan, Craig Shipley
- Arizona State: Chris Beasley, Barry Bonds, Doug Henry, Oddibe McDowell, Don Wakamatsu
- James Madison: Jeff Urban
- Maine: Bill Swift
- Michigan: Scott Kamieniecki, Barry Larkin, Chris Sabo, Gary Wayne
- Oklahoma State: Carlos Diaz, John Farrell, Gary Green, Mike Henneman, Pete Incaviglia, Robbie Wine
- Stanford: Mike Aldrete, Jeff Ballard, Mark Davis, Pete Stanicek
- Texas: Billy Bates, Mike Brumley, Mike Capel, Roger Clemens, Jeff Hearron, Bruce Ruffin, Calvin Schiraldi, Jose Tolentino

== See also ==
- 1983 NCAA Division II baseball tournament
- 1983 NCAA Division III baseball tournament
- 1983 NAIA World Series
