= 1992 NCAA Division I baseball season =

Baseball season

- Number of teams: 274

NCAA tournament

College World Series
- Champions: Pepperdine (1st title)
- Runners-up: Cal State Fullerton (7th CWS Appearance)
- Winning coach: Andy Lopez (1st title)
- MOP: Phil Nevin (Cal State Fullerton)

Seasons
- ← 1991 1993 →

The 1992 NCAA Division I baseball season, play of college baseball in the United States organized by the National Collegiate Athletic Association (NCAA) began in the spring of 1992. The season progressed through the regular season and concluded with the 1992 College World Series. The College World Series, held for the 46th time in 1992, consisted of one team from each of eight regional competitions and was held in Omaha, Nebraska, at Johnny Rosenblatt Stadium as a double-elimination tournament. Pepperdine claimed the championship for the first time.

== Realignment ==
- Florida State and South Carolina departed the Metro Conference for the Atlantic Coast Conference and the Southeastern Conference, respectively.
- Arkansas left the Southwest Conference for the Southeastern Conference.
- Georgia Southern and Arkansas–Little Rock moved from the Trans America Athletic Conference (TAAC) to the Southern Conference and the Sun Belt Conference, respectively.
- Old Dominion left the Sun Belt Conference and joined the Colonial Athletic Association.
- College of Charleston and Southeastern Louisiana joined the TAAC after reclassifying to NCAA Division I. Meanwhile, Georgia State restarted its program in the TAAC after 5 seasons without varsity baseball.
- Wright State and Youngstown State joined the Mid-Continent Conference, leaving the ranks of independents.
- Northern Iowa departed the Mid-Continent Conference for the Missouri Valley Conference.

=== Format changes ===
- With the addition of two new teams, the SEC split into Eastern and Western divisions.

== Conference winners ==
This is a partial list of conference champions from the 1992 season. The NCAA sponsored regional competitions to determine the College World Series participants. Each of the eight regionals consisted of six teams competing in double-elimination tournaments, with the winners advancing to Omaha. 24 teams earned automatic bids by winning their conference championship while 24 teams earned at-large selections.

Conference	Regular season winner	Conference Tournament	Tournament Venue • City	Tournament Winner
Atlantic 10 Conference	East - Rutgers; George Washington	1992 Atlantic 10 Conference baseball tournament	Bear Stadium • Boyertown, PA	George Washington
Atlantic Coast Conference	Clemson	1992 Atlantic Coast Conference baseball tournament	Greenville Municipal Stadium • Greenville, SC	NC State
Big East Conference	St. John's	1992 Big East Conference baseball tournament	Muzzy Field • Bristol, CT	Providence
Big Eight Conference	Oklahoma State	1992 Big Eight Conference baseball tournament	All Sports Stadium • Oklahoma City, OK	Oklahoma State
Big South Conference	Coastal Carolina	1992 Big South Conference baseball tournament	Charles Watson Stadium • Conway, SC	Coastal Carolina
Big Ten Conference	Ohio State	1992 Big Ten Conference baseball tournament	Trautman Field • Columbus, OH	Minnesota
Big West Conference	Long Beach State	no tournament		
Colonial Athletic Association	George Mason	1992 Colonial Athletic Association baseball tournament	Harrington Field • Greenville, NC	George Mason
EIBL	Yale	no tournament		
Metro Conference	VCU	1992 Metro Conference baseball tournament	Turchin Stadium • New Orleans, LA	Tulane
Mid-American Conference	Kent State	1992 Mid-American Conference baseball tournament	Gene Michael Field • Kent, OH	Kent State
Midwestern Collegiate Conference	Notre Dame	1992 Midwestern Collegiate Conference baseball tournament	Stanley Coveleski Regional Stadium • South Bend, IN	Notre Dame
Mid-Continent Conference	Blue - Wright State; Gray - Eastern Illinois	1992 Mid-Continent Conference baseball tournament	Chicago, IL	Wright State
Pacific-10 Conference	North - Washington; South - Arizona	no tournament		
Southeastern Conference	Eastern - Florida; Western - LSU	1992 Southeastern Conference baseball tournament	Louisiana Superdome • New Orleans, LA	LSU
Southern Conference	Western Carolina	1992 Southern Conference baseball tournament	College Park • Charleston, SC	Western Carolina
Southwest Conference	Texas	No tournament		
Trans America Athletic Conference	East - Stetson/FIU; West - Southeastern Louisiana	1992 Trans America Athletic Conference baseball tournament	Southeastern Louisiana Diamond • Hammond, LA	Southeastern Louisiana
West Coast Conference	Pepperdine	No tournament		

== Conference standings ==
The following is an incomplete list of conference standings:

1992 Atlantic Coast Conference baseball standings
	Conf.				Overall
Team	W		L	PCT	W		L	PCT
No. 10 Clemson ‍†‍‍^{y}	19	–	5	.792	50	–	14	.781
No. 5 Florida State ‍‍‍^{y}	16	–	7	.696	49	–	21	.700
No. 29 NC State ‍‍‡‍^{y}	15	–	9	.625	46	–	18	.719
No. 24 Georgia Tech ‍‍‍^{y}	14	–	9	.609	45	–	19	.703
Duke ‍‍‍	12	–	12	.500	38	–	16	.704
Wake Forest ‍‍‍	11	–	13	.458	36	–	22	.621
North Carolina ‍‍‍	8	–	16	.333	31	–	27	.534
Maryland ‍‍‍	7	–	15	.318	27	–	28	.491
Virginia ‍‍‍	3	–	19	.136	21	–	30	.412
† – Conference champion ‡ – Tournament champion y – Invited to the NCAA tournament As of June 30, 1992; Rankings from Collegiate Baseball

1992 Big East Conference baseball standings
	Conf.						Overall
Team	W		L		T	PCT	W		L		T	PCT
St. John's ‍†‍‍	14	–	5	–	0	.737	30	–	13	–	0	.698
Seton Hall ‍‍‍	14	–	7	–	0	.667	28	–	27	–	0	.509
Connecticut ‍‍‍	13	–	7	–	0	.650	25	–	20	–	1	.554
Providence ‍‍‡‍^{y}	12	–	8	–	0	.600	29	–	23	–	0	.558
Villanova ‍‍‍	9	–	10	–	0	.474	22	–	21	–	0	.512
Georgetown ‍‍‍	6	–	15	–	0	.286	12	–	30	–	1	.291
Pittsburgh ‍‍‍	5	–	13	–	0	.278	23	–	21	–	0	.523
Boston College ‍‍‍	5	–	13	–	0	.278	18	–	17	–	1	.514
† – Conference champion ‡ – Tournament champion y – Invited to the NCAA tournament As of June 30, 1992; Rankings from Collegiate Baseball

1992 Big Eight Conference baseball standings
	Conf.				Overall
Team	W		L	PCT	W		L	PCT
No. 13 Oklahoma State ‍†‍‡‍^{y}	17	–	7	.708	49	–	16	.754
No. 6 Oklahoma ‍†‍‍^{y}	17	–	7	.708	43	–	24	.642
Missouri ‍‍‍	12	–	12	.500	34	–	22	.607
Iowa State ‍‍‍	11	–	13	.458	33	–	23	.589
Nebraska ‍‍‍	11	–	13	.458	31	–	25	.554
Kansas State ‍‍‍	8	–	16	.333	28	–	28	.500
Kansas ‍‍‍	8	–	16	.333	25	–	28	.472
† – Conference champion ‡ – Tournament champion y – Invited to the NCAA tournament As of June 30, 1992; Rankings from Collegiate Baseball

1992 Big South Conference baseball standings
	Conf.						Overall
Team	W		L		T	PCT	W		L		T	PCT
Coastal Carolina ‍†‍‡‍	13	–	5	–	0	.722	33	–	27	–	0	.550
Davidson ‍‍‍	10	–	6	–	0	.625	28	–	25	–	0	.528
Winthrop ‍‍‍	10	–	7	–	0	.588	29	–	29	–	0	.500
Radford ‍‍‍	8	–	8	–	0	.500	28	–	23	–	0	.549
UNC Asheville ‍‍‍	8	–	10	–	0	.444	20	–	28	–	0	.417
Campbell ‍‍‍	6	–	9	–	0	.400	16	–	38	–	1	.300
Liberty ‍‍‍	5	–	11	–	0	.313	20	–	27	–	1	.427
Charleston Southern ‍‍‍	3	–	13	–	0	.188	12	–	34	–	0	.261
† – Conference champion ‡ – Tournament champion y – Invited to the NCAA tournament As of June 30, 1992; Rankings from Collegiate Baseball

1992 Big Ten Conference baseball standings
	Conf.				Overall
Team	W		L	PCT	W		L	PCT
No. 19 Ohio State ‍†‍‍^{y}	20	–	8	.714	40	–	21	.656
No. 25 Minnesota ‍‍‡‍^{y}	18	–	10	.643	42	–	21	.667
Michigan State ‍‍‍	17	–	11	.607	36	–	19	.655
Illinois ‍‍‍	16	–	12	.571	36	–	20	.643
Indiana ‍‍‍	14	–	14	.500	35	–	20	.636
Purdue ‍‍‍	13	–	15	.464	30	–	25	.545
Iowa ‍‍‍	12	–	16	.429	26	–	28	.481
Penn State ‍‍‍	11	–	17	.393	24	–	24	.500
Michigan ‍‍‍	11	–	17	.393	21	–	32	.396
Northwestern ‍‍‍	8	–	20	.286	18	–	38	.321
x – Division champion ‡ – Tournament champion y – Invited to the NCAA tournament As of June 30, 1992; Rankings from Collegiate Baseball

1992 Big West Conference baseball standings
	Conf.				Overall
Team	W		L	PCT	W		L	PCT
No. 23 Long Beach State ‍†‍‍^{y}	18	–	5	.783	36	–	21	.632
No. 2 Cal State Fullerton ‍‍‍^{y}	17	–	7	.708	46	–	17	.730
Fresno State ‍‍‍^{y}	16	–	8	.667	37	–	20	.649
UNLV ‍‍‍	13	–	11	.542	30	–	24	.556
San Jose State ‍‍‍	12	–	12	.500	32	–	21	.604
UC Irvine ‍‍‍	10	–	14	.417	23	–	27	.460
UC Santa Barbara ‍‍‍	9	–	14	.391	30	–	23	.566
New Mexico State ‍‍‍	6	–	18	.250	20	–	33	.377
Pacific ‍‍‍	6	–	18	.250	17	–	33	.340
† – Conference champion y – Invited to the NCAA tournament As of June 30, 1992; Rankings from Collegiate Baseball

1992 Colonial Athletic Association baseball standings
	Conf.				Overall
Team	W		L	PCT	W		L	PCT
George Mason ‍†‍‡‍^{y}	13	–	4	.765	39	–	18	.684
Richmond ‍‍‍	12	–	5	.706	32	–	17	.653
Old Dominion ‍‍‍	11	–	7	.611	39	–	19	.672
James Madison ‍‍‍	8	–	9	.471	26	–	24	.520
East Carolina ‍‍‍	7	–	10	.412	25	–	24	.510
UNC Wilmington ‍‍‍	7	–	11	.389	23	–	38	.377
William & Mary ‍‍‍	2	–	14	.125	18	–	27	.400
† – Conference champion ‡ – Tournament champion y – Invited to the NCAA tournament As of June 30, 1992; Rankings from Collegiate Baseball

1992 NCAA Division I baseball independents standings
	Conf.				Overall
Team	W		L	PCT	W		L	PCT
No. 3 Miami (FL) ‍‍‍^{y}		–		–	55	–	10	.846
Nevada ‍‍‍		–		–	43	–	11	.796
No. 26 Cal State Northridge ‍‍‍^{y}		–		–	38	–	16	.704
Sacramento State ‍‍‍		–		–	32	–	25	.561
Chapman ‍‍‍		–		–	29	–	24	.547
Grand Canyon ‍‍‍		–		–	25	–	27	.481
UNC Greensboro ‍‍‍		–		–	20	–	26	.435
Northeastern Illinois ‍‍‍		–		–	16	–	32	.333
Wisconsin–Milwaukee ‍‍‍		–		–	14	–	32	.304
Chicago State ‍‍‍		–		–	12	–	36	.250
Southern Utah ‍‍‍		–		–	4	–	43	.085
Georgia State ‍‍‍		–		–	2	–	28	.067
y – Invited to the NCAA tournament As of June 30, 1992; Rankings from Collegiate Baseball

1992 Mid-American Conference baseball standings
	Conf.						Overall
Team	W		L		T	PCT	W		L		T	PCT
Kent State ‍†‍‡‍^{y}	24	–	7	–	0	.774	45	–	13	–	0	.776
Ohio ‍‍‍	20	–	12	–	0	.625	33	–	22	–	0	.600
Central Michigan ‍‍‍	18	–	12	–	1	.597	31	–	27	–	1	.534
Ball State ‍‍‍	14	–	13	–	0	.519	23	–	27	–	0	.460
Miami ‍‍‍	16	–	15	–	0	.516	32	–	22	–	0	.593
Western Michigan ‍‍‍	14	–	16	–	0	.467	25	–	26	–	0	.490
Eastern Michigan ‍‍‍	10	–	15	–	0	.400	22	–	26	–	0	.458
Toledo ‍‍‍	7	–	18	–	0	.280	18	–	29	–	0	.383
Bowling Green ‍‍‍	7	–	22	–	1	.250	14	–	25	–	1	.363
† – Conference champion ‡ – Tournament champion y – Invited to the NCAA tournament As of June 30, 1992; Rankings from Collegiate Baseball

1992 Mid-Continent Conference baseball standings
	Conf.				Overall
Team	W		L	PCT	W		L	PCT
Blue Division
Wright State ^{x}‍‍‡‍	17	–	3	.850	40	–	16	.714
Akron ‍‍‍	15	–	7	.682	42	–	18	.700
Youngstown State ‍‍‍	6	–	16	.273	13	–	29	.310
Cleveland State ‍‍‍	5	–	17	.227	12	–	34	.261
Gray Division
Eastern Illinois ^{x}‍‍‍	13	–	7	.650	24	–	30	.444
Western Illinois ‍‍‍	11	–	9	.550	16	–	31	.340
UIC ‍‍‍	12	–	10	.545	23	–	27	.460
Valparaiso ‍‍‍	11	–	11	.500	19	–	30	.388
Northern Illinois ‍‍‍	6	–	16	.273	18	–	36	.333
‡ – Tournament champion As of June 30, 1992; Rankings from Collegiate Baseball

1992 Midwestern Collegiate Conference baseball standings
	Conf.				Overall
Team	W		L	PCT	W		L	PCT
No. 14 Notre Dame ‍†‍‡‍^{y}	18	–	2	.900	48	–	15	.762
Evansville ‍‍‍	14	–	5	.737	32	–	28	.533
Dayton ‍‍‍	9	–	11	.450	25	–	31	.446
Detroit ‍‍‍	7	–	12	.368	20	–	29	.408
Butler ‍‍‍	6	–	14	.300	18	–	35	.340
Xavier ‍‍‍	5	–	15	.250	16	–	43	.271
† – Conference champion ‡ – Tournament champion y – Invited to the NCAA Tournament; As of June 30, 1992; Rankings from Collegiate Baseball

1992 NCAA Division I baseball independents standings
	Conf.				Overall
Team	W		L	PCT	W		L	PCT
No. 3 Miami (FL) ‍‍‍^{y}		–		–	55	–	10	.846
Nevada ‍‍‍		–		–	43	–	11	.796
No. 26 Cal State Northridge ‍‍‍^{y}		–		–	38	–	16	.704
Sacramento State ‍‍‍		–		–	32	–	25	.561
Chapman ‍‍‍		–		–	29	–	24	.547
Grand Canyon ‍‍‍		–		–	25	–	27	.481
UNC Greensboro ‍‍‍		–		–	20	–	26	.435
Northeastern Illinois ‍‍‍		–		–	16	–	32	.333
Wisconsin–Milwaukee ‍‍‍		–		–	14	–	32	.304
Chicago State ‍‍‍		–		–	12	–	36	.250
Southern Utah ‍‍‍		–		–	4	–	43	.085
Georgia State ‍‍‍		–		–	2	–	28	.067
y – Invited to the NCAA tournament As of June 30, 1992; Rankings from Collegiate Baseball

1992 Pacific-10 Conference baseball standings
	Conf.				Overall
Team	W		L	PCT	W		L	PCT
Northern
Washington ^{x}‍‍‍^{y}	20	–	10	.667	39	–	21	.650
Washington State ‍‍‍	16	–	14	.533	31	–	23	.574
Portland State ‍‍‍	15	–	15	.500	29	–	26	.527
Portland ‍‍‍	15	–	15	.500	26	–	23	.531
Gonzaga ‍‍‍	14	–	16	.467	22	–	30	.423
Oregon State ‍‍‍	15	–	6	.714	32	–	18	.640
Southern
No. 17 Arizona ^{x}‍‍‍^{y}	18	–	12	.600	34	–	23	.596
No. 15 Stanford ‍‍‍^{y}	17	–	13	.567	39	–	23	.629
Arizona State ‍‍‍^{y}	14	–	16	.467	32	–	24	.571
No. 10 California ‍‍‍^{y}	14	–	16	.467	35	–	28	.556
No. 24 UCLA ‍‍‍^{y}	14	–	16	.467	37	–	26	.587
Southern California ‍‍‍	14	–	16	.467	28	–	26	.519
x – Division champion y – Invited to the NCAA tournament As of June 30, 1992; Rankings from Collegiate Baseball

1992 Southeastern Conference baseball standings
	Conf.				Overall
Team	W		L	PCT	W		L	PCT
Eastern
No. 16 Florida ^{x}‍‍‍^{y}	16	–	8	.667	44	–	20	.688
No. 28 South Carolina ‍‍‍^{y}	13	–	11	.542	42	–	22	.656
Georgia ‍‍‍^{y}	12	–	11	.522	35	–	25	.583
Vanderbilt ‍‍‍	11	–	12	.478	29	–	24	.547
Tennessee ‍‍‍	10	–	14	.417	35	–	20	.636
Kentucky ‍‍‍	10	–	14	.417	33	–	23	.589
Western
No. 9 LSU ^{x}‍†‍‡‍^{y}	18	–	6	.750	50	–	16	.758
No. 21 Mississippi State ‍‍‍^{y}	15	–	9	.625	40	–	22	.645
Arkansas ‍‍‍	10	–	13	.435	31	–	26	.544
Auburn ‍‍‍	10	–	14	.417	30	–	25	.545
Ole Miss ‍‍‍	9	–	14	.391	29	–	26	.527
Alabama ‍‍‍	8	–	16	.333	34	–	21	.618
x – Division champion † – Conference champion ‡ – Tournament champion y – Invited to the NCAA tournament As of June 30, 1992; Rankings from Collegiate Baseball

1992 Southern Conference baseball standings
	Conf.				Overall
Team	W		L	PCT	W		L	PCT
No. 17 Western Carolina ^{†‡y} ‍‍‍	17	–	4	.810	44	–	21	.677
Georgia Southern ‍‍‍	15	–	6	.714	31	–	27	.534
East Tennessee State ‍‍‍	11	–	8	.579	31	–	20	.608
The Citadel ‍‍‍	10	–	9	.526	35	–	20	.636
Furman ‍‍‍	11	–	10	.524	21	–	31	.404
Appalachian State ‍‍‍	6	–	14	.300	17	–	34	.333
Marshall ‍‍‍	5	–	13	.278	15	–	26	.366
VMI ‍‍‍	4	–	15	.211	11	–	39	.220
† – Conference champion ‡ – SoCon Tournament champion y – Invited to the NCAA tournament As of June 30, 1992; Rankings from Collegiate Baseball

1992 Trans America Athletic Conference baseball standings
	Conf.				Overall
Team	W		L	PCT	W		L	PCT
East
Stetson ^{x}‍‍‍^{y}	13	–	5	.722	38	–	21	.644
FIU ^{x}‍‍‍	13	–	5	.722	36	–	23	.610
Mercer ‍‍‍	8	–	10	.444	29	–	20	.592
College of Charleston ‍‍‍	2	–	16	.111	16	–	29	.356
West
Southeastern Louisiana ^{x}‍†‍‡‍^{y}	12	–	4	.750	38	–	22	.633
Centenary ^{x}‍†‍‍	12	–	4	.750	31	–	27	.534
Samford ‍‍‍	0	–	16	.000	13	–	43	.232
Georgia State ‍‍‍	0	–	0	–	2	–	30	.063
x – Division champion † – Conference champion ‡ – Tournament champion y – Invited to the NCAA tournament As of June 30, 1992; Rankings from Collegiate Baseball

1992 West Coast Conference baseball standings
	Conf.				Overall
Team	W		L	PCT	W		L	PCT
No. 1 Pepperdine ‍†‍‍^{y}	23	–	4	.852	48	–	11	.814
San Diego ‍‍‍	14	–	13	.519	28	–	24	.538
Santa Clara ‍‍‍	14	–	16	.467	23	–	32	.418
San Francisco ‍‍‍	13	–	16	.448	16	–	39	.291
Loyola Marymount ‍‍‍	10	–	16	.385	16	–	36	.308
Saint Mary's ‍‍‍	9	–	18	.333	15	–	36	.294
† – Conference champion y – Invited to the NCAA tournament As of June 30, 1992; Rankings from Collegiate Baseball

== College World Series ==
The 1992 season marked the forty sixth NCAA baseball tournament, which culminated with the eight team College World Series. The College World Series was held in Omaha, Nebraska. The eight teams played a double-elimination format, with Pepperdine claiming their first championship with a 3–2 win over Cal State Fullerton in the final.

First round
1	Miami (FL)	4^{13}
8	California	3
4	Cal State Fullerton	7
5	Florida State	2
8	California	4
5	Florida State	5
2	Wichita State	0
7	Pepperdine	6
3	Texas	15
6	Oklahoma	3
2	Wichita State	4
6	Oklahoma	8

Second round
1	Miami (FL)	4
4	Cal State Fullerton	3
5	Florida State	0
4	Cal State Fullerton	6
7	Pepperdine	7
3	Texas	0
6	Oklahoma	5
3	Texas	8

Semifinals
1	Miami (FL)	5	1
4	Cal State Fullerton	7	8
7	Pepperdine	5	—
3	Texas	4	—

Finals
4	Cal State Fullerton	2
7	Pepperdine	3
