= 1992 Cal State Fullerton Titans baseball team =

Baseball team

1992 Cal State Fullerton Titans baseball
- Conference: Big West Conference

Ranking
- Coaches: No. 2
- CB: No. 2
- Record: 46-17 (17–7 Big West)
- Head coach: Augie Garrido (17th season)
- Assistant coaches: George Horton (5th season); Rick Vanderhook (6th season); Bill Mosiello (2nd season)
- Home stadium: Titan Field; Amerige Park

1992 Big West Conference baseball standings
	Conf.				Overall
Team	W		L	PCT	W		L	PCT
No. 23 Long Beach State ‍†‍‍^{y}	18	–	5	.783	36	–	21	.632
No. 2 Cal State Fullerton ‍‍‍^{y}	17	–	7	.708	46	–	17	.730
Fresno State ‍‍‍^{y}	16	–	8	.667	37	–	20	.649
UNLV ‍‍‍	13	–	11	.542	30	–	24	.556
San Jose State ‍‍‍	12	–	12	.500	32	–	21	.604
UC Irvine ‍‍‍	10	–	14	.417	23	–	27	.460
UC Santa Barbara ‍‍‍	9	–	14	.391	30	–	23	.566
New Mexico State ‍‍‍	6	–	18	.250	20	–	33	.377
Pacific ‍‍‍	6	–	18	.250	17	–	33	.340
† – Conference champion y – Invited to the NCAA tournament As of June 30, 1992; Rankings from Collegiate Baseball

The 1992 Cal State Fullerton Titans baseball team represented California State University, Fullerton in the 1992 NCAA Division I baseball season. The Titans played their home games at Titan Field. The team was coached by Augie Garrido in his 17th season at Cal State Fullerton.

The Titans lost the College World Series, defeated by the Pepperdine Waves in the championship game.

== Roster ==
1992 Cal State Fullerton Titans roster
Pitchers: 13 Paco Chavez - Senior; 17 Chad Dembisky - Senior; 35 Bryan Dunagan - Freshman; 2 Derek Fahs - Freshman; 20 Tony Fetchel - Junior; 31 Bill Fitzgerald - Junior; 19 Yusef Ford - Senior; 34 Sonny Guzman - Freshman; 32 Mark Holiday - Junior; 38 Dan Naulty - Senior; 44 Marcus Nelson - Junior; 36 Mike Parisi - Freshman; 18 James Popoff - Senior; 41 Jeff Scarpitti - Junior	Infielders: 23 Jim Betzold - Sophomore; 25 Jeff Ferguson - Freshman; 21 Phil Nevin - Junior; 15 D. C. Olsen - Freshman; 7 Chris Powell - Senior; 5 Nate Rodriquez - Junior; 6 Steve Sisco - Senior; 40 Brian Wixom - Junior; Catchers: 37 Kevin Bill - Freshman; 30 Bret Hemphill - Sophomore; 24 Frank Herman - Senior; 22 Jason Moler - Senior	Outfielders: 10 Tony Banks - Junior; 33 Jeremy Carr - Junior; 27 Craig Fairbrother - Senior; 9 Steve Friedrich - Freshman; 26 Jack Jordan - Junior; 11 Dante Powell - Freshman; Coaches: 16 Augie Garrido - 17th Season; 8 George Horton - 5th Season; 28 Rick Vanderhook - 6th Season; 12 Bill Mosiello - 2nd Season

== Schedule ==
1992 Cal State Fullerton Titans baseball game log
Regular season
February (9–4)

Date	Opponent	Site/stadium	Score	Overall record	Big West record
February 3	UCLA	Amerige Park	2–3	0–1	–
February 8	at Stanford	Sunken Diamond	2–4	0–2	–
February 8	at Sanford	Sunken Diamond	8–3	1–2	–
February 9	at Sanford	Sunken Diamond	3–1	2–2	–
February 14	at Loyola Marymount	George C. Page Stadium	13–2	3–2	–
February 17	Cal State Northridge	Amerige Park	5–2	4–2	–
February 18	San Diego	Amerige Park	4–3	5–2	–
February 20	at Arizona	Frank Sancet Stadium	15–19	5–3	–
February 21	at Arizona	Frank Sancet Stadium	22–6	6–3	–
February 22	at Arizona	Frank Sancet Stadium	16–5	7–3	–
February 25	Chapman	Amerige Park	4–6	7–4	–
February 28	Illinois	Amerige Park	12–5	8–4	–
February 29	Illinois	Amerige Park	12–6	9–4	–

March (13–5)

Date	Opponent	Site/stadium	Score	Overall record	Big West record
March 1	Illinois	Amerige Park	7–4	10–4	–
March 4	Chapman	Amerige Park	10–3	11–4	–
March 6	Southern Utah	Amerige Park	7–0	12–4	–
March 7	Southern Utah	Amerige Park	11–2	13–4	–
March 8	Southern Utah	Amerige Park	19–0	14–4	–
March 10	USC	Amerige Park	6–10	14–5	–
March 13	UC Santa Barbara	Amerige Park	3–4	14–6	0–1
March 14	UC Santa Barbara	Amerige Park	6–2	15–6	1–1
March 15	UC Santa Barbara	Amerige Park	7–5	16–6	2–1
March 17	Hartford	Amerige Park	24–4	17–6	2–1
March 20	at New Mexico State	Presley Askew Field	16–6	18–6	3–1
March 21	at New Mexico State	Presley Askew Field	16–7	19–6	4–1
March 22	at New Mexico State	Presley Askew Field	8–10	19–7	4–2
March 24	Ohio State	Amerige Park	6–4	20–7	4–2
March 25	at Cal State Northridge	Matador Field	4–10	20–8	4–2
March 27	at Pacific	Billy Hebert Field	4–0	21–8	5–2
March 28	at Pacific	Billy Hebert Field	22–6	22–8	6–2
March 29	at Pacific	Billy Hebert Field	2–3	22–9	6–3

April (11–4)

Date	Opponent	Site/stadium	Score	Overall record	Big West record

May (5–2)

Date	Opponent	Site/stadium	Score	Overall record	Big West record
May 1	UC Irvine	Titan Field	6–8	33–14	13–6
May 2	UC Irvine	Titan Field	6–5	34–14	14–6
May 8	at San Jose State	San Jose Municipal Stadium	10–0	37–14	16–6
May 9	at San Jose State	San Jose Municipal Stadium	2–8	37–15	16–7
May 10	at San Jose State	San Jose Municipal Stadium	8–3	38–15	17–7

Postseason
NCAA tournament: South Regional (4–0)

Date	Opponent	Site/stadium	Score	Overall record	Big West record
May 21	vs Ohio State	Alex Box Stadium	3–2	39–15	17–7
May 22	vs Tulane	Alex Box Stadium	8–0	40–15	17–7
May 23	vs LSU	Alex Box Stadium	11–0	41–15	17–7
May 24	vs Ohio State	Alex Box Stadium	13–1	42–15	17–7

NCAA tournament: College World Series

Date	Opponent	Site/stadium	Score	Overall record	Big West record
May 29	vs Florida State	Rosenblatt Stadium	7–2	43–15	17–7
May 31	vs Miami (FL)	Rosenblatt Stadium	3–4	43–16	17–7
June 2	vs Florida State	Rosenblatt Stadium	6–0	44–16	17–7
June 3	vs Miami (FL)	Rosenblatt Stadium	7–5	45–16	17–7
June 5	vs Miami (FL)	Rosenblatt Stadium	8–1	46–16	17–7
June 6	vs Pepperdine	Rosenblatt Stadium	2–3	46–17	17–7

== Awards and honors ==
Dante Powell

- Baseball America All-Freshman Team
- All-Big West First Team

James Popoff

- Collegiate Baseball 3rd Team All-American
- All-Big West First Team
- Big West Pitcher of the Year

Phil Nevin

- Golden Spikes Award
- Baseball America Player of the Year
- College World Series Most Outstanding Player
- All-America First Team
- Big West Player of the Year
- All-Big West First Team
- All-Tournament Team

Jason Moler

- ABCA 2nd Team All-American
- Collegiate Baseball 3rd Team All-American
- All-Big West First Team

Dan Naulty

- All-Big West First Team

== Titans in the 1992 MLB draft ==
The following members of the Cal State Fullerton Titans baseball program were drafted in the 1992 Major League Baseball draft.

Round	Pick	Player	Position	MLB Club
1	1	Phil Nevin	3B	Houston Astros
4	109	Jason Moler	C	Philadelphia Phillies
14	402	Dan Naulty	P	Minnesota Twins
16	442	Steve Sisco	2B	Kansas City Royals
27	749	Jim Popoff	P	New York Mets
31	876	Yusef Ford	P	Chicago White Sox
