= 1992 Pepperdine Waves baseball team =

American college baseball season

1992 Pepperdine Waves baseball
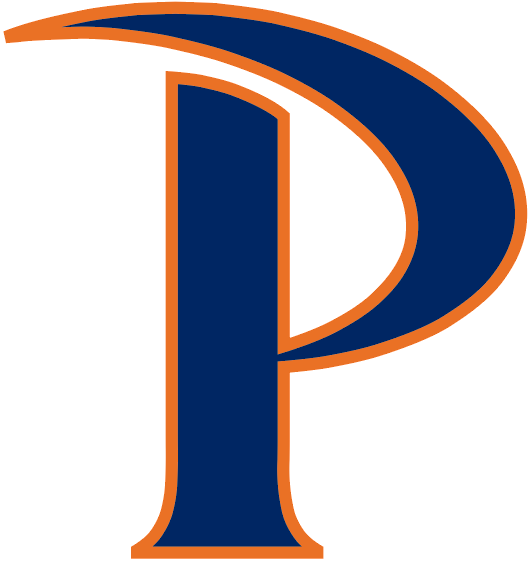

National champions West Coast Conference champions
- Conference: West Coast Conference
- Record: 48-11-1 (23-4 WCC)
- Head coach: Andy Lopez (4th year)
- Home stadium: Eddy D. Field Stadium

1992 West Coast Conference baseball standings
| | Conf. | | | | Overall |
| Team | W | | L | PCT | W | | L | PCT |
|---|---|---|---|---|---|---|---|---|
| No. 1 Pepperdine ‍†‍‍^{y} | 23 | – | 4 | .852 | 48 | – | 11 | .814 |
| San Diego ‍‍‍ | 14 | – | 13 | .519 | 28 | – | 24 | .538 |
| Santa Clara ‍‍‍ | 14 | – | 16 | .467 | 23 | – | 32 | .418 |
| San Francisco ‍‍‍ | 13 | – | 16 | .448 | 16 | – | 39 | .291 |
| Loyola Marymount ‍‍‍ | 10 | – | 16 | .385 | 16 | – | 36 | .308 |
| Saint Mary's ‍‍‍ | 9 | – | 18 | .333 | 15 | – | 36 | .294 |
† – Conference champion y – Invited to the NCAA tournament As of June 30, 1992; Rankings from Collegiate Baseball

The 1992 Pepperdine Waves baseball team represented Pepperdine University in the 1992 NCAA Division I baseball season. The Waves played their home games at Eddy D. Field Stadium. The team was coached by Andy Lopez in his 4th season at Pepperdine.

The Waves won the College World Series, defeating the Cal State Fullerton Titans in the championship game.

== Roster ==
1992 Pepperdine Waves roster
| Pitchers: Pat Ahearne; Jerry Aschoff; Armanda Cervantes; Steve Duda; Rian Glassford; Adam Housley; Sky Laskowitz; Matt Miller; Steve Montgomery; Jeff Myers; Josh Schultz; Derek Wallace | Infielders: Erik Ekdahl; David Lovell; David Main; Dan Melendez; Chris Milton; Pat O'Hara; Steve Rodriguez; John Sacchi; Mark Wasikowski | Outfielders: Matt McElreath; Matt Nuez; Jorge Paz; Chris Sheff; Catchers: Kevin Dell'Amico; Scott Vollmer |

== Schedule ==
1992 Pepperdine Waves baseball game log
Regular season
Regular season

| Opponent | Site/stadium | Score | Overall record | WCC record |
|---|---|---|---|---|
| Westmont | Eddy D. Field Stadium | 8-5 | 1–0 | – |
| Southern California | Eddy D. Field Stadium | 5-3 | 2–0 | – |
| at Southern California | Dedeaux Field | 10-9 | 3–0 | – |
| Cal Poly Pomona | Eddy D. Field Stadium | 8-6 | 4–0 | – |
| Chapman | Eddy D. Field Stadium | 5-2 | 5–0 | – |
| at Stanford | Sunken Diamond | 1-7 | 5–1 | – |
| at Stanford | Sunken Diamond | 3-4 | 5–2 | – |
| at Stanford | Sunken Diamond | 3-4 | 5–3 | – |
| Cal State Dominguez Hills | Eddy D. Field Stadium | 7-6 | 6–3 | – |
| Northwestern | Eddy D. Field Stadium | 19-8 | 7–3 | – |
| Northwestern | Eddy D. Field Stadium | 8-2 | 8–3 | – |
| at Long Beach State | Blair Field | 5-6 | 8–4 | – |
| at San Francisco | Benedetti Diamond | 14-0 | 9–4 | 1–0 |
| at San Francisco | Benedetti Diamond | 3-2 | 10–4 | 2–0 |
| at San Francisco | Benedetti Diamond | 5-11 | 10–5 | 2–1 |
| Santa Clara | Eddy D. Field Stadium | 1-0 | 11–5 | 3–1 |
| Santa Clara | Eddy D. Field Stadium | 13-0 | 12–5 | 4–1 |
| at UCLA | Jackie Robinson Stadium | 1-0 | 12–6 | – |
| at Loyola Marymount | George C. Page Stadium | 17-4 | 13–6 | 5–1 |
| at Loyola Marymount | George C. Page Stadium | 7-1 | 14–6 | 6–1 |
| at Loyola Marymount | George C. Page Stadium | 6-2 | 15–6 | 7–1 |
| Long Beach State | Eddy D. Field Stadium | 4-4 | 15–6–1 | – |
| Hartford | Eddy D. Field Stadium | 5-0 | 16–6–1 | – |
| Hartford | Eddy D. Field Stadium | 11-10 | 17–6–1 | – |
| at Saint Mary's | Louis Guisto Field | 13-1 | 18–6–1 | 8–1 |
| at Saint Mary's | Louis Guisto Field | 2-4 | 18–7–1 | 8–2 |
| at Saint Mary's | Louis Guisto Field | 4-6 | 18–8–1 | 8–3 |
| Stanford | Eddy D. Field Stadium | 5-4 | 19–8–1 | – |
| San Diego | Eddy D. Field Stadium | 2-0 | 20–8–1 | 9–3 |
| San Diego | Eddy D. Field Stadium | 5-0 | 21–8–1 | 10–3 |
| San Diego | Eddy D. Field Stadium | 2-4 | 21–9–1 | 10–4 |
| at San Diego | John Cunningham Stadium | 3-1 | 22–9–1 | 11–4 |
| at San Diego | John Cunningham Stadium | 6-1 | 23–9–1 | 12–4 |
| at San Diego | John Cunningham Stadium | 2-1 | 24–9–1 | 13–4 |
| UC Santa Barbara | Eddy D. Field Stadium | 10-6 | 25–9–1 | – |
| San Francisco | Eddy D. Field Stadium | 14-0 | 26–9–1 | 14–4 |
| San Francisco | Eddy D. Field Stadium | 5-2 | 27–9–1 | 15–4 |
| San Francisco | Eddy D. Field Stadium | 6-1 | 28–9–1 | 16–4 |
| at UC Santa Barbara | Caesar Uyesaka Stadium | 7-9 | 28–10–1 | – |
| at Chapman | W.O. Park | 5-2 | 29–10–1 | – |
| at Santa Clara | Buck Shaw Stadium | 9-8 | 30–10–1 | 17–4 |
| at Santa Clara | Buck Shaw Stadium | 8-7 | 31–10–1 | 18–4 |
| at Santa Clara | Buck Shaw Stadium | 16-0 | 32–10–1 | 19–4 |
| at Santa Clara | Buck Shaw Stadium | 10-1 | 33–10–1 | 20–4 |
| UC Irvine | Anteater Field | 4-3 | 34–10–1 | – |
| Cal State Northridge | Eddy D. Field Stadium | 11-2 | 35–10–1 | – |
| Loyola Marymount | Eddy D. Field Stadium | 6-1 | 36–10–1 | 21–4 |
| Loyola Marymount | Eddy D. Field Stadium | 3-2 | 37–10–1 | 22–4 |
| Loyola Marymount | Eddy D. Field Stadium | 17-2 | 38–10–1 | 23–4 |
| at Cal State Northridge | Matador Field | 6-4 | 39–10–1 | – |
| UCLA | Eddy D. Field Stadium | 16-8 | 40–10–1 | – |

Postseason
NCAA tournament: West Regional

| Opponent | Site/stadium | Score | Overall record |
|---|---|---|---|
| vs. Fresno State | Sancet Stadium | 5–4 | 41–10–1 |
| vs. Southeastern Louisiana | Sancet Stadium | 8–5 | 42–10–1 |
| vs. Washington | Sancet Stadium | 11–0 | 43–10–1 |
| vs. Hawaii | Sancet Stadium | 3–6 | 43–11–1 |
| vs. Hawaii | Sancet Stadium | 9–0 | 44–11–1 |

NCAA tournament: College World Series

| Date | Opponent | Site/stadium | Score | Overall record |
|---|---|---|---|---|
| May 30 | vs. Wichita State | Rosenblatt Stadium | 6–0 | 45–11–1 |
| June 1 | vs. Texas | Rosenblatt Stadium | 7–0 | 46–11–1 |
| June 4 | vs. Texas | Rosenblatt Stadium | 5–4 | 47–11–1 |
| June 6 | vs. Cal State Fullerton | Rosenblatt Stadium | 3–2 | 48–11–1 |

== Awards and honors ==
Pat Ahearne

- College World Series All-Tournament Team
- All-America First Team
- WCC Pitcher of the Year
- All-WCC First Team

Steve Duda

- All-WCC First Team

David Main

- All-WCC First Team

Dan Melendez

- College World Series All-Tournament Team
- All-America Second Team
- All-WCC First Team

Steve Montgomery

- All-America Second Team
- All-WCC First Team

Steve Rodriguez

- College World Series All-Tournament Team
- All-America Third Team
- WCC Player of the Year
- All-WCC First Team

Chris Sheff

- All-WCC First Team

Scott Vollmer

- College World Series All-Tournament Team
- All-WCC First Team

== Waves in the 1992 MLB draft ==
The following members of the Pepperdine Waves baseball program were drafted in the 1992 Major League Baseball draft.

| Player | Position | Round | Overall | MLB team |
|---|---|---|---|---|
| Derek Wallace | RHP | 1st | 11th | Chicago Cubs |
| Dan Melendez | 1B | 2nd | 57th | Los Angeles Dodgers |
| Steve Montgomery | RHP | 3rd | 83rd | St. Louis Cardinals |
| Steve Rodriguez | 2B | 5th | 142nd | Boston Red Sox |
| Pat Ahearne | RHP | 7th | 196th | Detroit Tigers |
| Chris Sheff | OF | 10th | 292nd | Florida Marlins |
| Jeff Myers | LHP | 14th | 383rd | San Francisco Giants |
| Jerry Aschoff | LHP | 39th | 1090th | Seattle Mariners |
