= 1992 Midwestern Collegiate Conference baseball tournament =

- Teams: 6
- Format: Double-elimination
- Finals site: Stanley Coveleski Regional Stadium; South Bend, Indiana
- Champions: Notre Dame (3rd title)
- Winning coach: Pat Murphy (3rd title)
- MVP: Chris Michalak (Notre Dame)

1992 Midwestern Collegiate Conference baseball standings
	Conf.				Overall
Team	W		L	PCT	W		L	PCT
No. 14 Notre Dame ‍†‍‡‍^{y}	18	–	2	.900	48	–	15	.762
Evansville ‍‍‍	14	–	5	.737	32	–	28	.533
Dayton ‍‍‍	9	–	11	.450	25	–	31	.446
Detroit ‍‍‍	7	–	12	.368	20	–	29	.408
Butler ‍‍‍	6	–	14	.300	18	–	35	.340
Xavier ‍‍‍	5	–	15	.250	16	–	43	.271
† – Conference champion ‡ – Tournament champion y – Invited to the NCAA Tournament; As of June 30, 1992; Rankings from Collegiate Baseball

The 1992 Midwestern Collegiate Conference baseball tournament took place in May 1992, near the close of the 1992 NCAA Division I baseball season. All six of the league's teams met in the double-elimination tournament held at Stanley Coveleski Regional Stadium home stadium of Notre Dame in South Bend, Indiana. Top seeded Notre Dame won their third league championship, also their second of four in a row. They qualified for the 1992 NCAA Division I baseball tournament.

== Seeding and format ==
The league's teams are seeded one through six based on winning percentage, using conference games only. The top seed plays the sixth seed while the second seed plays the fifth seed and the third seed plays the fourth in the opening round.

Team	W	L	PCT	GB	Seed
Notre Dame	18	2	.900	—	1
Evansville	14	5	.737	3.5	2
Dayton	9	11	.450	9	3
Detroit	7	12	.368	10.5	4
Butler	6	14	.300	12	5
Xavier	5	15	.250	13	6

== Bracket and results ==
First round
1	Notre Dame	3
6	Xavier	2
3	Dayton	10
4	Detroit	11
2	Evansville	5
5	Butler	4

Second round
1	Notre Dame	10
3	Dayton	1
4	Detroit	3
2	Evansville	2
6	Xavier	9
5	Butler	8

Third round
1	Notre Dame	11
4	Detroit	2
2	Evansville	12
6	Xavier	3

Semifinals
4	Detroit	2
2	Evansville	8

Final
1	Notre Dame	8
2	Evansville	1

== All-Tournament Team ==
The following players were named to the All-Tournament Team.

Pos	Name	School
P	Chris Michalak	Notre Dame
P	Greg Willming	Evansville
C	Sal Fasano	Evansville
1B	Joe Binkiewicz	Notre Dame
2B	Don Sikora	Detroit
3B	Cory Mee	Notre Dame
SS	Craig Counsell	Notre Dame
OF	Mike Heard	Detroit
OF	Clint Straub	Detroit
OF	Eric Danapilis	Notre Dame
DH	Ed Hartwell	Notre Dame

=== Most Valuable Player ===
Chris Michalak of Notre Dame was named Most Valuable Player of the Tournament.
