= 1992 Colonial Athletic Association baseball tournament =

American college baseball tournament

- Teams: 7
- Format: Double-elimination tournament
- Finals site: Harrington Field; Greenville, North Carolina
- Champions: George Mason (2nd title)
- Winning coach: Bill Brown (2nd title)
- MVP: Chris Widger (George Mason)

1992 Colonial Athletic Association baseball standings
	Conf.				Overall
Team	W		L	PCT	W		L	PCT
George Mason ‍†‍‡‍^{y}	13	–	4	.765	39	–	18	.684
Richmond ‍‍‍	12	–	5	.706	32	–	17	.653
Old Dominion ‍‍‍	11	–	7	.611	39	–	19	.672
James Madison ‍‍‍	8	–	9	.471	26	–	24	.520
East Carolina ‍‍‍	7	–	10	.412	25	–	24	.510
UNC Wilmington ‍‍‍	7	–	11	.389	23	–	38	.377
William & Mary ‍‍‍	2	–	14	.125	18	–	27	.400
† – Conference champion ‡ – Tournament champion y – Invited to the NCAA tournament As of June 30, 1992; Rankings from Collegiate Baseball

The 1992 Colonial Athletic Association baseball tournament was held at Harrington Field on the campus of East Carolina in Greenville, North Carolina, from May 12 through 16. The event determined the champion of the Colonial Athletic Association for the 1992 season. Top-seeded George Mason won the tournament for the second time and earned the CAA's automatic bid to the 1992 NCAA Division I baseball tournament.

Entering the event, East Carolina had won the most championships, with four, including the previous three. George Mason and Richmond had each won once.

== Format and seeding ==
The CAA's six teams were seeded one to seven based on winning percentage from the conference's round robin regular season. They played a double-elimination tournament with the top seed receiving a single bye. The new format was adopted due to the addition of Old Dominion to the conference.

Team	W	L	Pct.	GB	Seed
George Mason	13	4	.765	—	1
Richmond	12	5	.706	1	2
Old Dominion	11	7	.611	2.5	3
James Madison	8	9	.471	5	4
East Carolina	7	10	.412	6	5
UNC Wilmington	7	11	.389	6.5	6
William & Mary	2	14	.125	10.5	7

== Bracket and results ==
Upper round 1	Upper round 2	Upper final	Final
1	George Mason	7
4	James Madison	5
4	James Madison	2
5	East Carolina	1
1	George Mason	18
2	Richmond	5
3	Old Dominion	3
6	UNC Wilmington	6
6	UNC Wilmington	3
2	Richmond	7
2	Richmond	9
7	William & Mary	6
1	George Mason	1	6
2	Richmond	5	3
Lower round 1	Lower round 2	Lower round 3	Lower final
4	James Madison	4
3	Old Dominion	9	3	Old Dominion	13	2	Richmond	5
7	William & Mary	0	3	Old Dominion	4	6	UNC Wilmington	4
6	UNC Wilmington	5
6	UNC Wilmington	9
5	East Carolina	7

== Most Valuable Player ==
Chris Widger was named Tournament Most Valuable Player. Widger was a catcher for George Mason.
