= 1992 Big South Conference baseball tournament =

- Teams: 8
- Format: Double-elimination
- Finals site: Charles Watson Stadium; Conway, South Carolina
- Champions: Coastal Carolina (3rd title)
- Winning coach: John Vrooman (3rd title)
- MVP: Paul Leszcznski (Coastal Carolina)

1992 Big South Conference baseball standings
	Conf.						Overall
Team	W		L		T	PCT	W		L		T	PCT
Coastal Carolina ‍†‍‡‍	13	–	5	–	0	.722	33	–	27	–	0	.550
Davidson ‍‍‍	10	–	6	–	0	.625	28	–	25	–	0	.528
Winthrop ‍‍‍	10	–	7	–	0	.588	29	–	29	–	0	.500
Radford ‍‍‍	8	–	8	–	0	.500	28	–	23	–	0	.549
UNC Asheville ‍‍‍	8	–	10	–	0	.444	20	–	28	–	0	.417
Campbell ‍‍‍	6	–	9	–	0	.400	16	–	38	–	1	.300
Liberty ‍‍‍	5	–	11	–	0	.313	20	–	27	–	1	.427
Charleston Southern ‍‍‍	3	–	13	–	0	.188	12	–	34	–	0	.261
† – Conference champion ‡ – Tournament champion y – Invited to the NCAA tournament As of June 30, 1992; Rankings from Collegiate Baseball

The 1992 Big South Conference baseball tournament was the postseason baseball tournament for the Big South Conference, held from May 8 through 14, 1992, with the first round hosted by the higher seed and subsequent rounds at Charles Watson Stadium home field of Coastal Carolina in Conway, South Carolina. All eight teams participated in the double-elimination tournament. The champion, Coastal Carolina, won the title for the third time and second consecutive year.

== Format ==
All eight teams qualified for the tournament. The first round consisted of best-of-three series, with the winners advancing to a four-team, double-elimination tournament.

Team	W	L	Pct.	GB	Seed
Coastal Carolina	13	5	.722	—	1
Davidson	10	6	.625	2	2
Winthrop	10	7	.588	2.5	3
Radford	8	8	.500	4	4
UNC Asheville	8	10	.444	5	5
Campbell	6	9	.400	5.5	6
Liberty	5	11	.313	7	7
Charleston Southern	3	13	.188	9	8

== Bracket and results ==
First round
1	Coastal Carolina	6	5	—
8	Charleston Southern	2	1	—
4	Radford	6	4	—
5	UNC Asheville	14	7	—
3	Winthrop	11	8	—
6	Campbell	4	3	—
2	Davidson	3	7	—
7	Liberty	2	4	—

Quarter-finals
1	Coastal Carolina	5
5	UNC Asheville	3
3	Winthrop	11
2	Davidson	1
5	UNC Asheville	3
2	Davidson	6

Semi-finals
1	Coastal Carolina	2
3	Winthrop	1
3	Winthrop	8
2	Davidson	4

Final
1	Coastal Carolina	16	—
3	Winthrop	7	—

== All-Tournament Team ==
Name	School
Brian Adam	Winthrop
Chris Bevil	Winthrop
Heyward Bracey	Winthrop
Paul Brennan	Davidson
Dwight Hottle	Winthrop
Paul Leszcznski	Coastal Carolina
Mickey Lincoln	Coastal Carolina
Jeff Myers	Winthrop
Jay Nelson	Winthrop
Chris Pond	Coastal Carolina
Tim Sheriff	Winthrop

=== Most Valuable Player ===
Paul Leszcznski was named Tournament Most Valuable Player. Leszcznski was an outfielder for Coastal Carolina.
