= 1992 Trans America Athletic Conference baseball tournament =

American college baseball tournament

- Teams: 4
- Format: Double-elimination
- Finals site: Southeastern Louisiana Diamond; Hammond, Louisiana
- Champions: Southeastern Louisiana (1st title)
- Winning coach: Greg Marten (1st title)
- MVP: Kirk Bullinger (Southeastern Louisiana)

1992 Trans America Athletic Conference baseball standings
	Conf.				Overall
Team	W		L	PCT	W		L	PCT
East
Stetson ^{x}‍‍‍^{y}	13	–	5	.722	38	–	21	.644
FIU ^{x}‍‍‍	13	–	5	.722	36	–	23	.610
Mercer ‍‍‍	8	–	10	.444	29	–	20	.592
College of Charleston ‍‍‍	2	–	16	.111	16	–	29	.356
West
Southeastern Louisiana ^{x}‍†‍‡‍^{y}	12	–	4	.750	38	–	22	.633
Centenary ^{x}‍†‍‍	12	–	4	.750	31	–	27	.534
Samford ‍‍‍	0	–	16	.000	13	–	43	.232
Georgia State ‍‍‍	0	–	0	–	2	–	30	.063
x – Division champion † – Conference champion ‡ – Tournament champion y – Invited to the NCAA tournament As of June 30, 1992; Rankings from Collegiate Baseball

The 1992 Trans America Athletic Conference baseball tournament was held at Southeastern Louisiana Diamond on the campus of Southeastern Louisiana University in Hammond, Louisiana. This was the fourteenth tournament championship held by the Trans America Athletic Conference, in its fourteenth year of existence. Southeastern Louisiana won their first tournament championship in their first year in the league and earned the conference's automatic bid to the 1992 NCAA Division I baseball tournament.

== Format and seeding ==
The top two finishers from each division by conference winning percentage qualified for the tournament, with the top seed from one division playing the second seed from the opposite in the first round. Georgia State was ineligible and did not play games that counted in the conference standings, having restarted their program for the 1992 season. Both top seeds were claimed by tiebreaker.

Team	W	L	Pct.	GB	Seed
East
Stetson	13	5	.722	—	1E
FIU	13	5	.722	—	2E
Mercer	8	10	.556	5	—
College of Charleston	2	16	.111	11	—

Team	W	L	Pct.	GB	Seed
West
Southeastern Louisiana	12	4	.750	—	1W
Centenary	12	4	.750	—	2W
Samford	0	16	.000	12	—
Georgia State	0	0	—	—	—

== Bracket ==
First round
1E	Stetson	7
2W	Centenary	8
1W	Southeastern Louisiana	11
2E	FIU	0
Lower round 1
1E	Stetson	2
2E	FIU	2

Semi-finals
2W	Centenary	16
1W	Southeastern Louisiana	8
Lower final
1W	Southeastern Louisiana	9
2E	FIU	7

Finals
2W	Centenary	6	6
1W	Southeastern Louisiana	9	12

== All-Tournament Team ==
The following players were named to the All-Tournament Team.

POS	Player	School
P	Kirk Bullinger	Southeastern Louisiana
P	Steve Jiminez	Southeastern Louisiana
C	David Wyss	Centenary
1B	Chris Finley	Southeastern Louisiana
2B	Johnny Castanon	Southeastern Louisiana
3B	Greg Elliott	Southeastern Louisiana
3B	Deron Thornton	FIU
SS	Kiley Hughes	Southeastern Louisiana
DH	Brian Stier	Centenary
OF	Troy Melancon	Southeastern Louisiana
OF	Ray Ferrand	Southeastern Louisiana
OF	Jason Parker	Centenary

=== Most Valuable Player ===
Kirk Bullinger was named Tournament Most Valuable Player. Bullinger was a pitcher for Southeastern Louisiana.
