= List of Coastal Carolina Chanticleers head baseball coaches =

Coastal Carolina Chanticleers is an American college baseball team that represents Coastal Carolina University in the Sun Belt Conference. The Chanticleers compete in the National Collegiate Athletic Association (NCAA) Division I.

Coastal Carolina did not begin playing baseball until 1974, where they originally competed in the NAIA. They would remain in the NAIA until 1983, when they and seven other schools formed the Big South Conference. That league would petition for Div 1 status, gaining Div 1 status in 1985. Coastal would remain in the Big South Conference until the conclusion of the 2016 season, when they left for the Sun Belt Conference in order to play FBS Football.

There have been six head baseball coaches at Coastal Carolina.

== Key ==
General
#	Number of coaches (Note: A running total of the number of head coaches.)
GC	Games coached
†	Elected to the National College Baseball Hall of Fame

Overall
OW	Wins
OL	Losses
OT	Ties
O%	Winning percentage

Conference
CW	Wins
CL	Losses
CT	Ties
C%	Winning percentage

Postseason (Note: Postseason play involving the NCAA Division I Baseball Championship.)
PA	Total Appearances
PW	Total Wins
PL	Total Losses
WA	College World Series appearances
WW	College World Series wins
WL	College World Series losses

Championships
DC	Division regular season
CC	Conference regular season
CT	Conference tournament

== Coaches ==
List of head baseball coaches showing season(s) coached, overall records, conference records, postseason records, championships and selected awards*Statistics correct as of the end of the 2024 NCAA Division I baseball season
#	Name	Term	GC	OW	OL	OT	O%	CW	CL	CT	C%	PA	PW	PL	WA	WW	WL	DCs	CCs	CTs	NCs	Awards (Note: National, regional and conference coach of the year awards.)
1	John Vrooman	1974-1977, 1987-1995	642	366	276	0	.570	118	55	—	.682	1	0	2	—	—	—	—	5	2	—	NAIA Southeastern Region Coach (1977); Big South Conference Coach of the Year (1988, 1990)
2	Larry Carr	1978-1984	338	253	84	1	.749	—	—	—	—	—	—	—	—	—	—	—	—	—	—	—
3	Russ Bergman	1984	15	12	3	—	.800	—	—	—	—	—	—	—	—	—	—	—	—	—	—	—
4	Bobby Richardson	1985-1986	99	61	38	—	.616	22	14	—	.611	—	—	—	—	—	—	—	—	1	—	—
5	Gary Gilmore	1996-2024	1,710	1,114	593	3	.651	460	202	2	.693	22	37	38	1	6	2	4	14	13	1	Big South Coach of the Year (1999, 2002, 2005, 2007–2010, 2012); Sun Belt Coach of the Year (2018, 2023); NCAA Division I National Coach of the Year (2016)
6	Kevin Schnall	2025-2026	129	93	36	—	.721	47	13	—	.783	2	7	4	1	3	2	—	1	1	—	Sun Belt Coach of the Year (2025); Perfect Game Coach of the Year (2025)
7	Chris Lemonis	2027-present	—	—	—	—	—	—	—	—	—	—	—	—	—	—	—	—	—	—	—	
