= John Vrooman =

John Vrooman may refer to:

- John W. Vrooman (1844–1929), American lawyer, banker, and politician from New York
- John Perry Vrooman (1860–1923) Ontario physician and political figure
- John Vrooman (baseball)
