= 1992 Miami Hurricanes baseball team =

American college baseball season

1992 Miami Hurricanes baseball

NCAA Atlantic Regional champions

College World Series, 2–2
- Conference: Independent
- Record: 55–10
- Head coach: Ron Fraser (30th year)
- Home stadium: Mark Light Field

1992 NCAA Division I baseball independents standings
	Conf.				Overall
Team	W		L	PCT	W		L	PCT
No. 3 Miami (FL) ‍‍‍^{y}		–		–	55	–	10	.846
Nevada ‍‍‍		–		–	43	–	11	.796
No. 26 Cal State Northridge ‍‍‍^{y}		–		–	38	–	16	.704
Sacramento State ‍‍‍		–		–	32	–	25	.561
Chapman ‍‍‍		–		–	29	–	24	.547
Grand Canyon ‍‍‍		–		–	25	–	27	.481
UNC Greensboro ‍‍‍		–		–	20	–	26	.435
Northeastern Illinois ‍‍‍		–		–	16	–	32	.333
Wisconsin–Milwaukee ‍‍‍		–		–	14	–	32	.304
Chicago State ‍‍‍		–		–	12	–	36	.250
Southern Utah ‍‍‍		–		–	4	–	43	.085
Georgia State ‍‍‍		–		–	2	–	28	.067
y – Invited to the NCAA tournament As of June 30, 1992; Rankings from Collegiate Baseball

The 1992 Miami Hurricanes baseball team represented the University of Miami in the 1992 NCAA Division I baseball season. The Hurricanes played their home games at Mark Light Field. The team was coached by Ron Fraser in his 30th season at Miami.

The Hurricanes reached the College World Series, where they finished tied for third after winning an opening round game against California and a second-round game against eventual runner-up Cal State Fullerton, then losing a pair of semifinal games against Cal State Fullerton.

== Personnel ==
=== Roster ===
1992 Miami Hurricanes roster
Pitchers: - Jeff Alkire; - Fadul Arrieta; - Silvio Censale; - Dean Crow; - Dave Dorish; - Gus Gandarillas; - Danny Graves; - Kenny Henderson; - Jose Prado; - Denis Pujals; Catchers: - Chad Hoelker; - Charles Johnson	Infielders: - Chris Anderson; - Dave Berg; - Greg Coleman; - Kevin DiGiacomo; - Rick Ellstrom; - Luis Hernandez; - Juan Llanes; - Alex Miranda; - Chad Rupp; - Keith Tippett; Outfielders: - Gary Best; - Gino DiMare; - Frank Mora; - Donald Robinson; - Johnathen Smith; - Bruce Thompson	Unknown: - Clint Brown; - Fernando Ruiz; - Jeff Seale; - Kevin Wheeler

=== Coaches ===
1992 Miami Hurricanes baseball coaching staff
- Ron Fraser – Head coach – 30th year

== Schedule and results ==
Legend
Miami win
Miami loss

1992 Miami Hurricanes baseball game log
Regular season

February
Date	Opponent	Site/stadium	Score	Overall record
Feb 7	Seton Hall	Mark Light Field • Coral Gables, FL	W 14–2	1–0
Feb 8	Seton Hall	Mark Light Field • Coral Gables, FL	W 25–3	2–0
Feb 9	Seton Hall	Mark Light Field • Coral Gables, FL	W 4–1	3–0
Feb 13	FIU	Mark Light Field • Coral Gables, FL	W 6–1	4–0
Feb 14	FIU	Mark Light Field • Coral Gables, FL	W 22–1	5–0
Feb 16	FIU	Mark Light Field • Coral Gables, FL	W 7–1	6–0
Feb 19	Barry	Mark Light Field • Coral Gables, FL	W 13–4	7–0
Feb 22	at Florida	Alfred A. McKethan Stadium • Gainesville, FL	L 3–7	7–1
Feb 23	at Florida	Alfred A. McKethan Stadium • Gainesville, FL	L 5–8	7–2
Feb 28	Stetson	Mark Light Field • Coral Gables, FL	L 5–8	7–3
Feb 29	Stetson	Mark Light Field • Coral Gables, FL	W 7–2	8–3

March
Date	Opponent	Site/stadium	Score	Overall record
Mar 1	Stetson	Mark Light Field • Coral Gables, FL	W 7–5	9–3
Mar 3	Villanova	Mark Light Field • Coral Gables, FL	W 12–2	10–3
Mar 5	Providence	Mark Light Field • Coral Gables, FL	W 4–0	11–3
Mar 6	Florida	Mark Light Field • Coral Gables, FL	W 7–1	12–3
Mar 7	Florida	Mark Light Field • Coral Gables, FL	W 6–5	13–3
Mar 10	Illinois	Mark Light Field • Coral Gables, FL	L 5–14	13–4
Mar 11	Illinois	Mark Light Field • Coral Gables, FL	W 7–1	14–4
Mar 13	Illinois State	Mark Light Field • Coral Gables, FL	W 10–2	15–4
Mar 14	Illinois State	Mark Light Field • Coral Gables, FL	W 3–0	16–4
Mar 15	Pace	Mark Light Field • Coral Gables, FL	W 12–0	17–4
Mar 17	Rutgers	Mark Light Field • Coral Gables, FL	W 10–0	18–4
Mar 19	Rutgers	Mark Light Field • Coral Gables, FL	W 14–7	19–4
Mar 20	Southern Illinois	Mark Light Field • Coral Gables, FL	W 9–1	20–4
Mar 21	Southern Illinois	Mark Light Field • Coral Gables, FL	W 5–1	21–4
Mar 22	Youngstown State	Mark Light Field • Coral Gables, FL	W 12–3	22–4
Mar 27	Notre Dame	Mark Light Field • Coral Gables, FL	L 1–2	22–5
Mar 28	Notre Dame	Mark Light Field • Coral Gables, FL	W 6–1	23–5
Mar 29	Notre Dame	Mark Light Field • Coral Gables, FL	W 6–5^{11}	24–5
Mar 31	at South Florida	Red McEwen Field • Tampa, FL	W 15–3	25–5

April
Date	Opponent	Site/stadium	Score	Overall record
Apr 1	at South Florida	Red McEwen Field • Tampa, FL	W 8–7	26–5
Apr 5	Rollins	Mark Light Field • Coral Gables, FL	W 9–1	27–5
Apr 7	Barry	Mark Light Field • Coral Gables, FL	W 12–8	28–5
Apr 10	at Florida State	Dick Howser Stadium • Tallahassee, FL	W 10–6	29–5
Apr 11	at Florida State	Dick Howser Stadium • Tallahassee, FL	W 6–3	30–5
Apr 12	at Florida State	Dick Howser Stadium • Tallahassee, FL	W 6–5	31–5
Apr 15	North Florida	Mark Light Field • Coral Gables, FL	W 3–2	32–5
Apr 17	St. Thomas	Mark Light Field • Coral Gables, FL	W 11–1	33–5
Apr 18	St. Thomas	Mark Light Field • Coral Gables, FL	W 4–3^{12}	34–5
Apr 21	Florida Atlantic	Mark Light Field • Coral Gables, FL	W 14–2	35–5
Apr 24	Florida State	Mark Light Field • Coral Gables, FL	W 7–3	36–5
Apr 25	Florida State	Mark Light Field • Coral Gables, FL	W 5–4	37–5
Apr 26	Florida State	Mark Light Field • Coral Gables, FL	L 2–3	37–6
Apr 28	St. Thomas	Mark Light Field • Coral Gables, FL	W 11–1	38–6
Apr 29	Nova Southeastern	Mark Light Field • Coral Gables, FL	W 12–5	39–6

May
Date	Opponent	Site/stadium	Score	Overall record
May 1	Texas	Mark Light Field • Coral Gables, FL	W 6–1	40–6
May 2	Texas	Mark Light Field • Coral Gables, FL	W 3–2	41–6
May 3	Texas	Mark Light Field • Coral Gables, FL	L 3–10	41–7
May 8	at Maine	Mahaney Diamond • Orono, ME	W 5–1	42–7
May 9	at Maine	Mahaney Diamond • Orono, ME	W 8–7^{10}	43–7
May 10	at Maine	Mahaney Diamond • Orono, ME	W 5–1	44–7
May 12	Tampa	Mark Light Field • Coral Gables, FL	W 5–1	45–7
May 13	Tampa	Mark Light Field • Coral Gables, FL	W 12–11	46–7
May 15	Georgia Tech	Mark Light Field • Coral Gables, FL	W 6–5^{13}	47–7
May 16	Georgia Tech	Mark Light Field • Coral Gables, FL	W 6–2	48–7
May 17	Georgia Tech	Mark Light Field • Coral Gables, FL	W 4–3	49–7

Postseason

NCAA Atlantic Regional
Date	Opponent	Seed	Site/stadium	Score	Overall record	NCAAT record
May 22	(6) UMBC	(1)	Mark Light Field • Coral Gables, FL	W 3–1	50–7	1–0
May 23	(4) Notre Dame	(1)	Mark Light Field • Coral Gables, FL	L 3–6	50–8	1–1
May 24	(2) NC State	(1)	Mark Light Field • Coral Gables, FL	W 5–4	51–8	2–1
May 24	(3) South Carolina	(1)	Mark Light Field • Coral Gables, FL	W 17–1	52–8	3–1
May 25	(4) Notre Dame	(1)	Mark Light Field • Coral Gables, FL	W 5–1	53–8	4–1

College World Series
Date	Opponent	Seed	Site/stadium	Score	Overall record	CWS record
May 29	(8) California	(1)	Johnny Rosenblatt Stadium • Omaha, NE	W 4–3^{13}	54–8	1–0
May 31	(4) Cal State Fullerton	(1)	Johnny Rosenblatt Stadium • Omaha, NE	W 4–3	55–8	2–0
June 3	(4) Cal State Fullerton	(1)	Johnny Rosenblatt Stadium • Omaha, NE	L 5–7	55–9	2–1
June 5	(4) Cal State Fullerton	(1)	Johnny Rosenblatt Stadium • Omaha, NE	L 1–8	55–10	2–2
