= 1992 Southeastern Conference baseball tournament =

- Teams: 8
- Format: Eight-team double elimination tournament
- Finals site: Louisiana Superdome; New Orleans, Louisiana
- Champions: LSU (3rd title)
- Winning coach: Skip Bertman (3rd title)
- MVP: Andy Sheets (LSU)
- Attendance: 24,329

1992 Southeastern Conference baseball standings
	Conf.				Overall
Team	W		L	PCT	W		L	PCT
Eastern
No. 16 Florida ^{x}‍‍‍^{y}	16	–	8	.667	44	–	20	.688
No. 28 South Carolina ‍‍‍^{y}	13	–	11	.542	42	–	22	.656
Georgia ‍‍‍^{y}	12	–	11	.522	35	–	25	.583
Vanderbilt ‍‍‍	11	–	12	.478	29	–	24	.547
Tennessee ‍‍‍	10	–	14	.417	35	–	20	.636
Kentucky ‍‍‍	10	–	14	.417	33	–	23	.589
Western
No. 9 LSU ^{x}‍†‍‡‍^{y}	18	–	6	.750	50	–	16	.758
No. 21 Mississippi State ‍‍‍^{y}	15	–	9	.625	40	–	22	.645
Arkansas ‍‍‍	10	–	13	.435	31	–	26	.544
Auburn ‍‍‍	10	–	14	.417	30	–	25	.545
Ole Miss ‍‍‍	9	–	14	.391	29	–	26	.527
Alabama ‍‍‍	8	–	16	.333	34	–	21	.618
x – Division champion † – Conference champion ‡ – Tournament champion y – Invited to the NCAA tournament As of June 30, 1992; Rankings from Collegiate Baseball

The 1992 Southeastern Conference baseball tournament was held at the Louisiana Superdome in New Orleans, LA from May 13 through 17. LSU won the tournament and earned the Southeastern Conference's automatic bid to the 1992 NCAA tournament.

== Regular-season results ==
Eastern Division
Team	W	L	Pct	GB	Seed
Florida	16	8	.667	—	2
South Carolina	13	11	.542	3	4
Georgia	12	11	.522	3.5	5
Vanderbilt	11	12	.478	4.5	6
Tennessee	10	14	.417	6	—
Kentucky	10	14	.417	6	—

Western Division
Team	W	L	Pct	GB	Seed
LSU	18	6	.750	—	1
Mississippi State	15	9	.625	3	3
Arkansas	10	13	.435	7.5	7
Auburn	10	14	.417	8	8
Ole Miss	9	14	.391	8.5	—
Alabama	8	16	.333	10	—

== Tournament ==
First round
8	Auburn	0
2	Florida	2
5	Georgia	6
3	Mississippi State	4
7	Arkansas	8
4	South Carolina	6
6	Vanderbilt	2
1	LSU	7

Second round
2	Florida	12
5	Georgia	5
7	Arkansas	1
1	LSU	8
Lower round 1
8	Auburn	1
3	Mississippi State	4
4	South Carolina	14
6	Vanderbilt	1

Third round
2	Florida	3
1	LSU	1
Lower round 2
3	Mississippi State	3
5	Georgia	6
4	South Carolina	9
7	Arkansas	5

Semi-finals
1	LSU	5
5	Georgia	3
4	South Carolina	11
2	Florida	4

Championship
1	LSU	6
4	South Carolina	3

Championship (If Needed)
1	LSU	12
2	Florida	1

- Ole Miss, Tennessee, Kentucky, and Alabama did not make the tournament.

== All-Tournament Team ==
Position	Player	School
1B	Brent Killen	Florida
2B	Todd Walker	LSU
SS	Andy Sheets	LSU
3B	Burke Cromer	South Carolina
C	Scott Epps	Arkansas
OF	David Majeski	Florida
OF	Chris Moock	LSU
OF	Jerry Shepherd	South Carolina
DH	Mike Neal	LSU
P	Lloyd Peever	LSU
P	Ronnie Rantz	LSU
MVP	Andy Sheets	LSU

== See also ==
- College World Series
- NCAA Division I Baseball Championship
- Southeastern Conference baseball tournament
