= 1992 ACC tournament =

1992 ACC tournament may refer to:

- 1992 ACC men's basketball tournament
- 1992 ACC women's basketball tournament
- 1992 ACC men's soccer tournament
- 1992 ACC women's soccer tournament
- 1992 Atlantic Coast Conference baseball tournament
- 1992 Atlantic Coast Conference softball tournament
