= 1992 Mid-Continent Conference baseball tournament =

- Teams: 6
- Format: Double-elimination
- Finals site: Chicago
- Champions: Wright State (1st title)
- Winning coach: Ron Nischwitz (1st title)
- MVP: Jon Sbrocco (Wright State)

1992 Mid-Continent Conference baseball standings
	Conf.				Overall
Team	W		L	PCT	W		L	PCT
Blue Division
Wright State ^{x}‍‍‡‍	17	–	3	.850	40	–	16	.714
Akron ‍‍‍	15	–	7	.682	42	–	18	.700
Youngstown State ‍‍‍	6	–	16	.273	13	–	29	.310
Cleveland State ‍‍‍	5	–	17	.227	12	–	34	.261
Gray Division
Eastern Illinois ^{x}‍‍‍	13	–	7	.650	24	–	30	.444
Western Illinois ‍‍‍	11	–	9	.550	16	–	31	.340
UIC ‍‍‍	12	–	10	.545	23	–	27	.460
Valparaiso ‍‍‍	11	–	11	.500	19	–	30	.388
Northern Illinois ‍‍‍	6	–	16	.273	18	–	36	.333
‡ – Tournament champion As of June 30, 1992; Rankings from Collegiate Baseball

The 1992 Mid-Continent Conference Tournament took place from May 15 through 18. The top six regular season finishers of the league's nine teams met in the double-elimination tournament held in Chicago, Illinois. Wright State won the tournament for the first and only time.

== Format and seeding ==
The top three teams from each division advanced to the tournament.

Blue Division
Team	W	L	Pct.	GB	Seed
Wright State	17	3	.850	—	1B
Akron	15	7	.682	3	2B
Youngstown State	6	16	.273	12	3B
Cleveland State	5	17	.227	13	—

Gray Division
Team	W	L	Pct.	GB	Seed
Eastern Illinois	13	7	.650	—	1G
Western Illinois	11	9	.550	2	2G
UIC	12	10	.545	2	3G
Valparaiso	11	11	.500	3	—
Northern Illinois	6	16	.273	8	—

== Tournament ==
Bracket to be included

=== Game-by-game results ===
Game	Winner	Score	Loser	Comment
1	(1B) Wright State	4–3	(3G) UIC	
2	(2B) Akron	11–5	(2G) Western Illinois	
3	(1G) Eastern Illinois	4–3	(3B) Youngstown State	
4	(2G) Western Illinois	6–5	(3G) UIC	UIC eliminated
5	(1B) Wright State	14–2	(3B) Youngstown State	Youngstown State eliminated
6	(1G) Eastern Illinois	2–1	(2B) Akron	
7	(2B) Akron	8–7	(2G) Western Illinois	Western Illinois eliminated
8	(1B) Wright State	6–4	(1G) Eastern Illinois	
9	(2B) Akron	9–5	(1G) Eastern Illinois	Eastern Illinois eliminated
10	(1B) Wright State	12–10	(2B) Akron	Wright State wins Mid-Con Championship

== All-Tournament Team ==
Name	School
Brian Anderson	Wright State
Jeff Ashton	Wright State
Dave Hudson	Akron
Jason Jetel	Eastern Illinois
Mike Kimler	Arkon
Steve Lemke	Eastern Illinois
Bill Osmanski	Wright State
Brad Owens	Western Illinois
Jeff Ronevich	Akron
Jon Sbrocco	Wright State
Mike Taylor	Akron

=== Tournament Most Valuable Player ===
Jon Sbrocco of Wright State was named Tournament MVP.
