= 1992 Atlantic Coast Conference baseball tournament =

American college baseball tournament

- Teams: 9
- Format: Nine-team double elimination
- Finals site: Greenville Municipal Stadium; Greenville, South Carolina
- Champions: NC State (4th title)
- Winning coach: Ray Tanner (1st title)
- MVP: Matt Donahue (NC State)
- Attendance: 43,675

1992 Atlantic Coast Conference baseball standings
	Conf.				Overall
Team	W		L	PCT	W		L	PCT
No. 10 Clemson ‍†‍‍^{y}	19	–	5	.792	50	–	14	.781
No. 5 Florida State ‍‍‍^{y}	16	–	7	.696	49	–	21	.700
No. 29 NC State ‍‍‡‍^{y}	15	–	9	.625	46	–	18	.719
No. 24 Georgia Tech ‍‍‍^{y}	14	–	9	.609	45	–	19	.703
Duke ‍‍‍	12	–	12	.500	38	–	16	.704
Wake Forest ‍‍‍	11	–	13	.458	36	–	22	.621
North Carolina ‍‍‍	8	–	16	.333	31	–	27	.534
Maryland ‍‍‍	7	–	15	.318	27	–	28	.491
Virginia ‍‍‍	3	–	19	.136	21	–	30	.412
† – Conference champion ‡ – Tournament champion y – Invited to the NCAA tournament As of June 30, 1992; Rankings from Collegiate Baseball

The 1992 Atlantic Coast Conference baseball tournament was the 1992 postseason baseball championship of the NCAA Division I Atlantic Coast Conference, held at Greenville Municipal Stadium in Greenville, South Carolina, from May 9 through 13. NC State defeated Clemson in the championship game, earning the conference's automatic bid to the 1992 NCAA Division I baseball tournament.

== Format ==
All nine teams qualified for the conference tournament, with several byes allowing for a nine-team double-elimination tournament.

=== Seeding Procedure ===
From TheACC.com:

On Saturday (The Semifinals) of the ACC Baseball Tournament, the match-up between the four remaining teams is determined by previous opponents. If teams have played previously in the tournament, every attempt will be made to avoid a repeat match-up between teams, regardless of seed. If it is impossible to avoid a match-up that already occurred, then the determination is based on avoiding the most recent, current tournament match-up, regardless of seed. If no match-ups have occurred, the team left in the winners bracket will play the lowest seeded team from the losers bracket.

== Regular season results ==
Team	W	L	PCT	GB	Seed
Clemson	19	5	.792	–	1
Florida State	16	7	.696	2.5	2
NC State	15	9	.625	4	3
Georgia Tech	14	9	.560	6.5	4
Duke	12	12	.500	7	5
Wake Forest	11	13	.458	8	6
North Carolina	8	16	.333	11	7
Maryland	7	15	.292	11	8
Virginia	3	19	.125	15	9

== Tournament ==
=== Winner & Loser Bracket Games ===
Round 1 Match-Up
6	Wake Forest	5
5	Duke	2

Round 2 Loser's Bracket Match-Up
7	North Carolina	11
8	Maryland	7

=== Main Bracket ===
1st/2nd Round
9	Virginia	2
1	Clemson	3
6	Wake Forest	1
2	Florida State	6
7	North Carolina	4
4	Georgia Tech	5
8	Maryland	1
3	NC State	7

2nd/3rd Round
2	Florida State	2
1	Clemson	5
4	Georgia Tech	4
3	N.C. State	7
Lower round 1
5	Duke	12
9	Virginia	9
7	North Carolina	7
6	Wake Forest	3

3rd/4th Round
1	Clemson	1
3	NC State	11
Lower round 2
5	Duke	3
4	Georgia Tech	7
2	Florida State	7
7	North Carolina	3

Semifinals
4	Georgia Tech	4
1	Clemson	5
3	NC State	0
2	Florida State	1

Championship
1	Clemson	11
2	Florida State	0

Championship (if-needed)
3	NC State	7
1	Clemson	3

To clarify the brackets above, the match-ups (by round) to the reordered semifinals were as follows:

- 1st Round: Clemson vs. Virginia, Duke vs. Wake Forest, Florida State - bye, NC State vs. Maryland, Georgia Tech v. North Carolina
- 2nd Round (winner's): Clemson - bye, Florida State v. Wake Forest, NC State v. Georgia Tech
- 2nd Round (loser's): Virginia vs. Duke, Maryland vs. North Carolina
- 3rd Round (winner's): Clemson vs. Florida State, NC State - bye
- 3rd Round (loser's): Georgia Tech vs. Duke, Wake Forest vs. North Carolina
- 4th Round (winner's): NC State vs. Clemson
- 4th Round (loser's): Georgia Tech - bye, North Carolina vs. Florida State

== All-tournament team ==
Position	Player	School
C	Jason Varitek	Georgia Tech
1B	Vinny Hughes	NC State
2B	Joe Taylor	Clemson
SS	Sean Drinkwater	NC State
3B	Paul Borawski	NC State
OF	Ron Esquieres	Duke
OF	Jay Payton	Georgia Tech
OF	Kevin Northrup	Clemson
DH	Chris Roberts	Florida State
SP	Matt Donahue	NC State
RP	Aaron Jersild	Clemson
MVP	Matt Donahue	NC State

== See also ==
- College World Series
- NCAA Division I Baseball Championship
- Atlantic Coast Conference baseball tournament
