= 1992 Florida State Seminoles baseball team =

American college baseball season

1992 Florida State Seminoles baseball

NCAA Atlantic Regional champions

College World Series, 1–2
- Conference: Atlantic Coast Conference
- Record: 49–21 (16–7 ACC)
- Head coach: Mike Martin (13th year)
- Home stadium: Dick Howser Stadium

1992 Atlantic Coast Conference baseball standings
	Conf.				Overall
Team	W		L	PCT	W		L	PCT
No. 10 Clemson ‍†‍‍^{y}	19	–	5	.792	50	–	14	.781
No. 5 Florida State ‍‍‍^{y}	16	–	7	.696	49	–	21	.700
No. 29 NC State ‍‍‡‍^{y}	15	–	9	.625	46	–	18	.719
No. 24 Georgia Tech ‍‍‍^{y}	14	–	9	.609	45	–	19	.703
Duke ‍‍‍	12	–	12	.500	38	–	16	.704
Wake Forest ‍‍‍	11	–	13	.458	36	–	22	.621
North Carolina ‍‍‍	8	–	16	.333	31	–	27	.534
Maryland ‍‍‍	7	–	15	.318	27	–	28	.491
Virginia ‍‍‍	3	–	19	.136	21	–	30	.412
† – Conference champion ‡ – Tournament champion y – Invited to the NCAA tournament As of June 30, 1992; Rankings from Collegiate Baseball

The 1992 Florida State Seminoles baseball team represented Florida State University in the 1992 NCAA Division I baseball season. The Seminoles played their home games at Dick Howser Stadium, and completed their first season in the Atlantic Coast Conference. The team was coached by Mike Martin in his thirteenth season as head coach at Florida State.

The Seminoles reached the College World Series, their twelfth appearance in Omaha, where they finished tied for fifth place after recording a win against California and a pair of losses to eventual runner-up Cal State Fullerton.

== Personnel ==
=== Roster ===
1992 Florida State Seminoles roster
Pitchers: 4 - Roger Bailey - Junior; 7 - Tim Davis - Senior; 14 - Chris Roberts - Junior; 17 - John Wasdin - Sophomore; 29 - LaWhit Lizzmore - Senior; 31 - Bryan Harris - (redshirt) Sophomore; 32 - Paul Wilson - Freshman; 35 - Jim Rushworth - Junior; 39 - Jeff Tibbitts - Sophomore; 43 - Jeff Tam - Junior; 44 - John Nedeau - Junior; 49 - Charlie Cruz - Freshman	Catchers: 21 - Marc Dunbar - (redshirt) Junior; 22 - Colby Weaver - Freshman; 26 - John Cook - Freshman; Infielders: 1 - Allen Bevis - Senior; 2 - Casey Yarbrough - Junior; 5 - Kevin McCray - Junior; 9 - Tony Liebsack - Senior; 10 - Link Jarrett - Sophomore; 13 - Grady Jordan - Junior; 16 - Bob Armstrong - Junior; 23 - Nandy Serrano - Senior	Outfielders: 12 - Randy Hodges - Freshman; 15 - Kenny Felder - Junior; 30 - Ty Mueller - (redshirt) Junior; 33 - Justin Rigney - Freshman; 45 - Chris Brock - Senior

=== Coaches ===
1992 Florida State Seminoles baseball coaching staff
- Mike Martin - Head coach - 13th year

== Schedule and results ==
Legend
Florida State win
Florida State loss

1992 Florida State Seminoles baseball game log
Regular season

February
Date	Opponent	Site/stadium	Score	Overall record	ACC record
Feb 1	College of Charleston*	Dick Howser Stadium • Tallahassee, FL	W 15–3	1–0	
Feb 2	College of Charleston*	Dick Howser Stadium • Tallahassee, FL	W 4–1	2–0	
Feb 9	at Arizona State*	Packard Stadium • Tempe, AZ	W 4–2	3–0	
Feb 9	at Arizona State*	Packard Stadium • Tempe, AZ	L 1–4	3–1	
Feb 14	VMI*	Dick Howser Stadium • Tallahassee, FL	W 10–4	4–1	
Feb 15	VMI*	Dick Howser Stadium • Tallahassee, FL	W 20–0	5–1	
Feb 16	VMI*	Dick Howser Stadium • Tallahassee, FL	W 5–4	6–1	
Feb 19	at Florida*	Alfred A. McKethan Stadium • Gainesville, FL	W 2–1	7–1	
Feb 21	Duke	Dick Howser Stadium • Tallahassee, FL	W 13–1	8–1	1–0
Feb 22	Duke	Dick Howser Stadium • Tallahassee, FL	L 4–5	8–2	1–1
Feb 23	Duke	Dick Howser Stadium • Tallahassee, FL	W 1–0	9–2	2–1
Feb 28	at Minnesota*	Hubert H. Humphrey Metrodome • Minneapolis, MN	W 3–1	10–2	
Feb 29	vs Texas A&M*	Hubert H. Humphrey Metrodome • Minneapolis, MN	L 1–9	10–3	

March
Date	Opponent	Site/stadium	Score	Overall record	ACC record
Mar 1	vs Mississippi State*	Hubert H. Humphrey Metrodome • Minneapolis, MN	W 5–1	11–3	
Mar 3	Charleston Southern*	Dick Howser Stadium • Tallahassee, FL	W 14–2	12–3	
Mar 4	Charleston Southern*	Dick Howser Stadium • Tallahassee, FL	W 13–8	13–3	
Mar 6	Coastal Carolina*	Dick Howser Stadium • Tallahassee, FL	W 6–1	14–3	
Mar 7	Coastal Carolina*	Dick Howser Stadium • Tallahassee, FL	W 5–2	15–3	
Mar 9	Richmond*	Dick Howser Stadium • Tallahassee, FL	W 2–1	16–3	
Mar 10	Richmond*	Dick Howser Stadium • Tallahassee, FL	W 5–1	17–3	
Mar 11	Richmond*	Dick Howser Stadium • Tallahassee, FL	W 8–2	18–3	
Mar 13	at North Carolina	Boshamer Stadium • Chapel Hill, NC	W 9–3	19–3	3–1
Mar 14	at North Carolina	Boshamer Stadium • Chapel Hill, NC	L 2–11	19–4	3–2
Mar 15	at North Carolina	Boshamer Stadium • Chapel Hill, NC	W 4–2	20–4	4–2
Mar 18	Georgia State*	Dick Howser Stadium • Tallahassee, FL	W 7–1	21–4	
Mar 19	Georgia State*	Dick Howser Stadium • Tallahassee, FL	W 7–1	22–4	
Mar 20	NC State	Dick Howser Stadium • Tallahassee, FL	W 4–0	23–4	5–2
Mar 21	NC State	Dick Howser Stadium • Tallahassee, FL	W 12–1	24–4	6–2
Mar 22	NC State	Dick Howser Stadium • Tallahassee, FL	L 4–6	24–5	6–3
Mar 24	at Virginia	UVA Baseball Field • Charlottesville, VA	W 4–3	25–5	7–3
Mar 25	at Virginia	UVA Baseball Field • Charlottesville, VA	W 13–7	26–5	8–3
Mar 27	at Clemson	Beautiful Tiger Field • Clemson, SC	L 4–10	26–6	8–4
Mar 28	at Clemson	Beautiful Tiger Field • Clemson, SC	L 0–12	26–7	8–5
Mar 29	at Clemson	Beautiful Tiger Field • Clemson, SC	L 0–14	26–8	8–6
Mar 31	Mercer*	Dick Howser Stadium • Tallahassee, FL	L 3–4	26–9	

April
Date	Opponent	Site/stadium	Score	Overall record	ACC record
Apr 1	Mercer	Dick Howser Stadium • Tallahassee, FL	W 8–1	27–9	
Apr 3	Georgia Tech	Dick Howser Stadium • Tallahassee, FL	W 9–6	28–9	9–6
Apr 4	Georgia Tech	Dick Howser Stadium • Tallahassee, FL	W 3–2	29–9	10–6
Apr 5	Georgia Tech	Dick Howser Stadium • Tallahassee, FL	L 3–10	29–10	10–7
Apr 8	Florida*	Dick Howser Stadium • Tallahassee, FL	W 4–0	30–10	
Apr 10	Miami (FL)*	Dick Howser Stadium • Tallahassee, FL	L 6–10	30–11	
Apr 11	Miami (FL)*	Dick Howser Stadium • Tallahassee, FL	L 3–6	30–12	
Apr 12	Miami (FL)*	Dick Howser Stadium • Tallahassee, FL	L 5–6	30–13	
Apr 15	Florida	Dick Howser Stadium • Tallahassee, FL	L 1–3	30–14	
Apr 17	at Wake Forest	Gene Hooks Stadium • Winston-Salem, NC	W 9–3	31–14	11–7
Apr 18	at Wake Forest	Gene Hooks Stadium • Winston-Salem, NC	W 9–4	32–14	12–7
Apr 19	at Wake Forest	Gene Hooks Stadium • Winston-Salem, NC	W 11–1	33–14	13–7
Apr 24	at Miami (FL)*	Mark Light Field • Coral Gables, FL	L 3–7	33–15	
Apr 25	at Miami (FL)*	Mark Light Field • Coral Gables, FL	L 4–5	33–16	
Apr 26	at Miami (FL)*	Mark Light Field • Coral Gables, FL	W 3–2	34–16	

May
Date	Opponent	Site/stadium	Score	Overall record	ACC record
May 1	Maryland	Dick Howser Stadium • Tallahassee, FL	W 12–4	35–16	14–7
May 2	Maryland	Dick Howser Stadium • Tallahassee, FL	W 15–3	36–16	15–7
May 3	Maryland	Dick Howser Stadium • Tallahassee, FL	W 18–5	37–16	16–7
May 5	at Florida*	Alfred A. McKethan Stadium • Gainesville, FL	W 4–1	38–16	

Postseason

ACC Tournament
Date	Opponent	Seed	Site/stadium	Score	Overall record	ACCT Record
May 10	(6) Wake Forest	(2)	Greenville Municipal Stadium • Greenville, SC	W 6–1	39–16	1–0
May 11	(1) Clemson	(2)	Greenville Municipal Stadium • Greenville, SC	L 2–5	39–17	1–1
May 12	(7) North Carolina	(2)	Greenville Municipal Stadium • Greenville, SC	W 7–3	40–17	2–1
May 12	(8) NC State	(2)	Greenville Municipal Stadium • Greenville, SC	W 1–0	41–17	3–1
May 13	(1) Clemson	(2)	Greenville Municipal Stadium • Greenville, SC	L 0–11	41–18	3–2

May
Date	Opponent	Site/stadium	Score	Overall record
May 15	Georgia State	Dick Howser Stadium • Tallahassee, FL	W 36–7	42–18
May 16	Georgia State	Dick Howser Stadium • Tallahassee, FL	W 17–4	43–18

NCAA Atlantic Regional
Date	Opponent	Seed	Site/stadium	Score	Overall record	NCAAT record
May 21	(5) Western Carolina	(2)	Dick Howser Stadium • Tallahassee, FL	L 0–1	43–19	0–1
May 22	(6) Stetson	(2)	Dick Howser Stadium • Tallahassee, FL	W 2–0	44–19	1–1
May 23	(4) Kent State	(2)	Dick Howser Stadium • Tallahassee, FL	W 4–2	45–19	2–1
May 23	(4) Stanford	(2)	Dick Howser Stadium • Tallahassee, FL	W 9–4	46–19	3–1
May 24	(5) Western Carolina	(2)	Dick Howser Stadium • Tallahassee, FL	W 4–3	47–19	4–1
May 24	(5) Western Carolina	(2)	Dick Howser Stadium • Tallahassee, FL	W 18–3	48–19	5–1

College World Series
Date	Opponent	Seed	Site/stadium	Score	Overall record	CWS record
May 29	(4) Cal State Fullerton	(5)	Johnny Rosenblatt Stadium • Omaha, NE	L 2–7	48–20	0–1
May 31	(8) California	(5)	Johnny Rosenblatt Stadium • Omaha, NE	W 5–4	49–20	1–1
June 2	(4) Cal State Fullerton	(5)	Johnny Rosenblatt Stadium • Omaha, NE	L 0–6	49–21	1–2
