= Amerige Park =

Athletic facility in Fullerton, California

Coordinates: 33.869395°N 117.929735°W

Amerige Park is a public park and multi-purpose athletic facility located at 300 West Commonwealth Avenue in Fullerton, California. It sits on the site of the former Fullerton High School. It was named for the city founders, George and Edward Amerige. Amerige Park serves as the site of the Fullerton Community Center and Duane Winters Field.

== Baseball Legacy ==
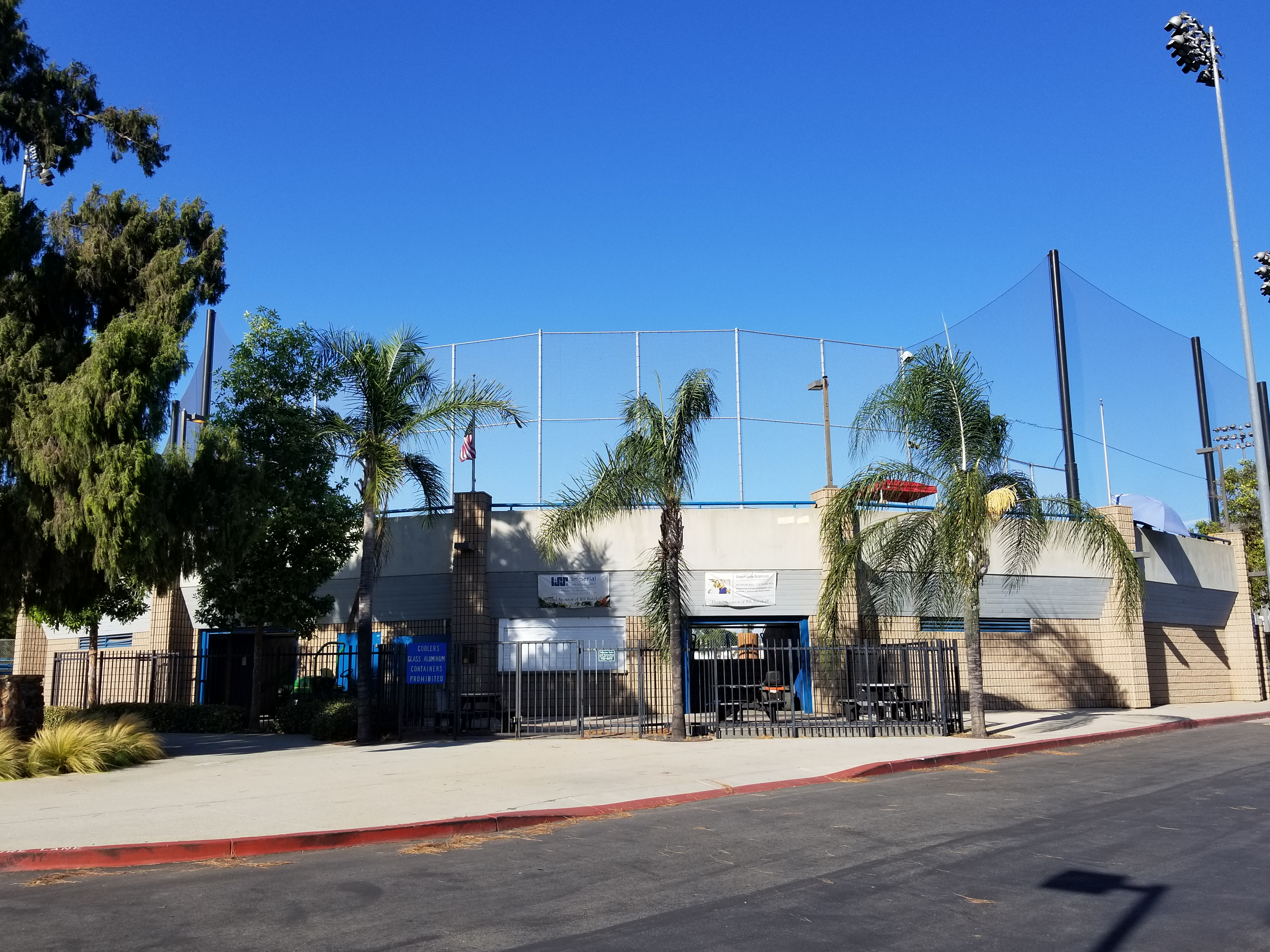
Amerige Park (baseball stadium)

=== Minor League baseball ===
Amerige Park served as the spring training grounds for the Pacific Coast League in baseball's early years for teams such as the Hollywood Stars (1935–36; now known as the San Diego Padres), Seattle Rainiers (1937–40), Sacramento Solons (1941–42; 1944), the Los Angeles Angels (1946-55; no relation to the Anaheim Angels) and the Dallas-Fort Worth Rangers (the 1960s as an L.A. Angels affiliate). Also, hall of Famers Joe DiMaggio, Walter Johnson, and Satchel Paige are known to have played on the field.

In 2011, the park was being considered for possible remodeling and expansion to accommodate a proposed move by the Fullerton Flyers professional baseball team. The team's owners in 2011, Western Sports & Entertainment, were never able to reach an agreement with the city of Fullerton and the Flyers never played at Amerige Park.

=== College baseball ===
Amerige park is the home of the Hope International University Royals (NAIA college located in Fullerton). In their second year of existence, HIU made the NAIA World Series in 2017 and would win their first NAIA World Series Championship in 2024.

The Cal State Fullerton Titans baseball team played some home games at Amerige Park during the 1992 college baseball season.

== Alibi Ike ==
The 1935 romantic comedy film Alibi Ike was partially filmed here. The film was the first feature film starring role for Olivia de Havilland.
