= Kirk Bullinger =

American baseball player (born 1969)

- Relief pitcher
- Born: October 28, 1969 (age 55); New Orleans, Louisiana, U.S.
- Batted: Right Threw: Right

MLB debut
- August 30, 1998, for the Montreal Expos

Last MLB appearance
- September 6, 2004, for the Houston Astros

MLB statistics
- Win–loss record: 2–0
- Earned run average: 6.53
- Strikeouts: 22
- Stats at Baseball Reference

Teams
- Montreal Expos (1998); Boston Red Sox (1999); Philadelphia Phillies (2000); Houston Astros (2003–2004)
Medals
Men's baseball
Representing United States
Baseball World Cup
Silver medal – second place	2001 Taipei	National team

Kirk Matthew Bullinger (born October 28, 1969) is an American former professional baseball middle relief pitcher, who played in Major League Baseball (MLB) for the Montreal Expos (1998), Boston Red Sox (1999), Philadelphia Phillies (2000), and Houston Astros (2003-2004). Bullinger threw and batted right-handed. He is the brother of former big league pitcher Jim Bullinger.

In a four-season career, Bullinger posted a 2–0 record with a 6.53 ERA and one save in 49 games pitched.

Bullinger played college baseball at Southeastern Louisiana University. In 1992, Bullinger threw a one-hitter for the Lions in the Trans America Athletic Conference (now Atlantic Sun Conference) baseball tournament.

== Coaching career ==
In 2009, Bullinger was assistant baseball coach at the University of New Orleans. There, he served as pitching coach and also assisted with recruiting. Bullinger then coached pitchers for the Nola Monsters Baseball Club, an amateur travel team based in Louisiana. He is now head baseball coach at Archbishop Shaw High School in Marrero, Louisiana.
