= Pat Ahearne =

American baseball player (born 1969)

- Pitcher
- Born: December 10, 1969 (age 56); San Francisco, California, U.S.
- Batted: Right Threw: Right

MLB debut
- June 14, 1995, for the Detroit Tigers

Last MLB appearance
- June 30, 1995, for the Detroit Tigers

MLB statistics
- Win–loss record: 0–2
- Earned run average: 11.70
- Strikeouts: 4

CPBL statistics
- Win–loss record: 2–4
- Earned run average: 4.42
- Strikeouts: 25
- Stats at Baseball Reference

Teams
- Detroit Tigers (1995); Macoto Cobras (2007)

Patrick Howard Ahearne (born December 10, 1969) is an American former professional baseball pitcher.

== Career ==
=== Amateur career ===
Ahearne grew up in Albuquerque but later moved to Playa del Rey, Los Angeles where he attended St. Bernard High School. At St. Bernard, he and Royce Clayton led the baseball team to the California Interscholastic Federation semifinal as seniors in 1988.

Ahearne did not receive any NCAA Division I scholarship offers after high school and, as a result, enrolled at Los Angeles Harbor College. At Harbor College, he set a school record with 24 wins in two seasons and, in 1990, led the team to a state title and was a first-team community college All-American and all-conference selection. He was later inducted into the Harbor College Athletic Hall of Fame.

Ahearned received several scholarship offers on the strength of his junior college performance and chose to play college baseball for Pepperdine. As a junior in 1991, he was named to the All-West Coast Conference team. The following year, he was the winning pitcher in the clinching game of the 1992 College World Series; he was also named to the All-Tournament Team. He was unanimously selected to the 1992 College Baseball All-America Team and was named the West Coast Conference Pitcher of the Year. He finished his career at Pepperdine with 26 wins, a 2.86 ERA and 209 strikeouts. In 2007, he was named to the conference's 40th Anniversary Baseball Team.

=== Professional career ===
Ahearne was drafted by the Tigers in the seventh round of the 1992 draft. He made his Major League debut on June 14, 1995, against the New York Yankees. In his one-year Major League career, Ahearne had a 0–2 record, with an 11.70 ERA, in four games.

After his brief Major League career, he bounced back and forth between affiliated Minor League Baseball and independent baseball. He pitched in the minors until 2004 in the New York Mets, Los Angeles Dodgers, Seattle Mariners and Florida Marlins farm systems before ending his affiliated career with three seasons in the Detroit Tigers system. Between those stints in affiliated ball, he pitched in one game for the Duluth-Superior Dukes of the Northern League in 1996, giving up six runs in less than five innings. He also had three stints with the Bridgeport Bluefish of the Atlantic League of Professional Baseball in 1998, 1999 and 2002. After his affiliated career ended in 2004, he returned to the Atlantic League again in 2005 and remained there with Bridgeport and the Long Island Ducks until departing during the 2007 season for the Macoto Cobras of the Chinese Professional Baseball League. Ahearne also spent seven winters in the Venezuelan Professional Baseball League.

After playing in Taiwan, Ahearne represented the United States in a series of exhibitions against Italy and Spain's national teams in Europe. From there, he began playing with Russian club Tornado Balashikha in 2008 and appeared in that year's European Cup. The following year, he helped coach the Czech national team in the 2009 Baseball World Cup and began pitching in Brno for AVG Draci Brno in the Czech Extraliga, a stint which continued until 2011. In 2011, he served as pitching coach for the Czech team which made it to the semifinals of the 2011 European Junior Baseball Championship. In 2012, he served as a player-coach for Kotlarka in Prague.

In 2011, at 41 years old, he returned to the Australian Baseball League, where he had pitched for three seasons earlier in his career. While pitching for the Adelaide Bite, he was 15.5 years older than the average pitcher in the league.

In 2013, he was hired as a pitching coach for the Bridgeport Bluefish. He also returned to the mound for his sixth season pitching for the club, his first since 2007. He was three years older than Brett Tomko, the second-oldest pitcher in the Atlantic League that season.

Ahearne was the head coach of the Hong Kong national baseball team at the 2018 Asian Games; the team beat Indonesia in its only victory of the tournament.

Ahearne was hired as the head coach of the varsity baseball team at Rye Country Day School beginning in 2018.
