= Gus Gandarillas =

American baseball player (born 1971)

- Pitcher
- Born: July 19, 1971 (age 55); Coral Gables, Florida, U.S.
- Batted: Right Threw: Right

MLB debut
- July 17, 2001, for the Milwaukee Brewers

Last MLB appearance
- October 5, 2001, for the Milwaukee Brewers

MLB statistics
- Win–loss record: 0–0
- Earned run average: 5.49
- Strikeouts: 7
- Stats at Baseball Reference

Teams
- Milwaukee Brewers (2001)

Gustavo Gandarillas (born July 19, 1971) is an American former Major League Baseball pitcher. He played during one season at the major league level for the Milwaukee Brewers. He was drafted by the Minnesota Twins in the third round of the 1992 amateur entry draft. Gandarillas played his first professional season with their Rookie League Elizabethton Twins in 1992, and split his last with the Brewers' Triple-A Indianapolis Indians and Double-A Huntsville Stars in 2002.

He played college baseball at the University of Miami.
