= Steve Sisco =

American baseball player (born 1969)

- Utility player
- Born: December 2, 1969 (age 56); Thousand Oaks, California, U.S.
- Batted: Right Threw: Right

MLB debut
- May 6, 2000, for the Atlanta Braves

Last MLB appearance
- September 30, 2000, for the Atlanta Braves

MLB statistics
- Batting average: .185
- Home runs: 1
- Runs batted in: 2
- Stats at Baseball Reference

Teams
- Atlanta Braves (2000)

Steve Sisco (born December 2, 1969) is an American former Major League Baseball utility player who played in 2000 with the Atlanta Braves. He bats and throws right-handed. Sisco was drafted by the Kansas City Royals in the 16th round of the 1992 draft.
