= Derek Wallace =

American baseball player (born 1971)

- Pitcher
- Born: September 1, 1971 (age 54); Van Nuys, California, U.S.
- Batted: Right Threw: Right

MLB debut
- August 13, 1996, for the New York Mets

Last MLB appearance
- September 4, 1999, for the Kansas City Royals

MLB statistics
- Win–loss record: 2–4
- Earned run average: 3.82
- Strikeouts: 20
- Stats at Baseball Reference

Teams
- New York Mets (1996); Kansas City Royals (1999)
Medals
Men's baseball
Representing United States
Pan American Games
Silver medal – second place	1999 Winnipeg	Team
World Junior Baseball Championship
Gold medal – first place	1989 Trois-Rivières	Team

Derek Robert Wallace (born September 1, 1971) is an American former professional baseball pitcher. Wallace pitched two seasons in Major League Baseball (MLB). He attended college at Pepperdine. In 1996, he played for the New York Mets and in 1999 he played for the Kansas City Royals. Wallace compiled a career record of 2-4 in 27 games and an ERA of 3.82. Wallace batted and threw right-handed.

A native of Van Nuys, California, Wallace attended Chatsworth High School and Pepperdine University. In 1991, he played collegiate summer baseball with the Chatham A's of the Cape Cod Baseball League, and was named the league's outstanding pro prospect. He was selected by the Chicago Cubs in the first round of the 1992 MLB draft. He holds the distinction of having tied an MLB record by striking out four batters in one inning.

== See also ==
- List of Major League Baseball single-inning strikeout leaders
