= Bret Hemphill =

American baseball player (born 1971)

- Catcher
- Born: December 17, 1971 (age 54); Santa Clara, California, U.S.
- Batted: Switch Threw: Right

MLB debut
- June 28, 1999, for the Anaheim Angels

Last MLB appearance
- October 3, 1999, for the Anaheim Angels

MLB statistics
- Batting average: .143
- Home runs: 0
- Hits: 3
- Runs batted in: 2
- Stats at Baseball Reference

Teams
- Anaheim Angels (1999)

Bret Ryan Hemphill (born December 17, 1971) is an American former professional baseball player who played one season for the Anaheim Angels of Major League Baseball (MLB). He also played 11 seasons in the minor leagues in the Angels' organization. He currently resides in Roseville, California and is a coach for the traveling team of Golden Spikes Baseball. In June 2017, as the coach of the Golden Spikes Cowboys, with assistant coach Cory Barker, he led the Cowboys to a 10-1 record at Cooperstown Dreams Park and finishing 2nd out of 104 teams and hitting an astounding 53 home runs in 11 games. He currently coaches the Golden Spikes 11u team, the Gators. He also coached the Sierra College Wolverine's baseball team in Rocklin, California.
