= Phil Nevin =

American baseball player, coach and manager (born 1971)

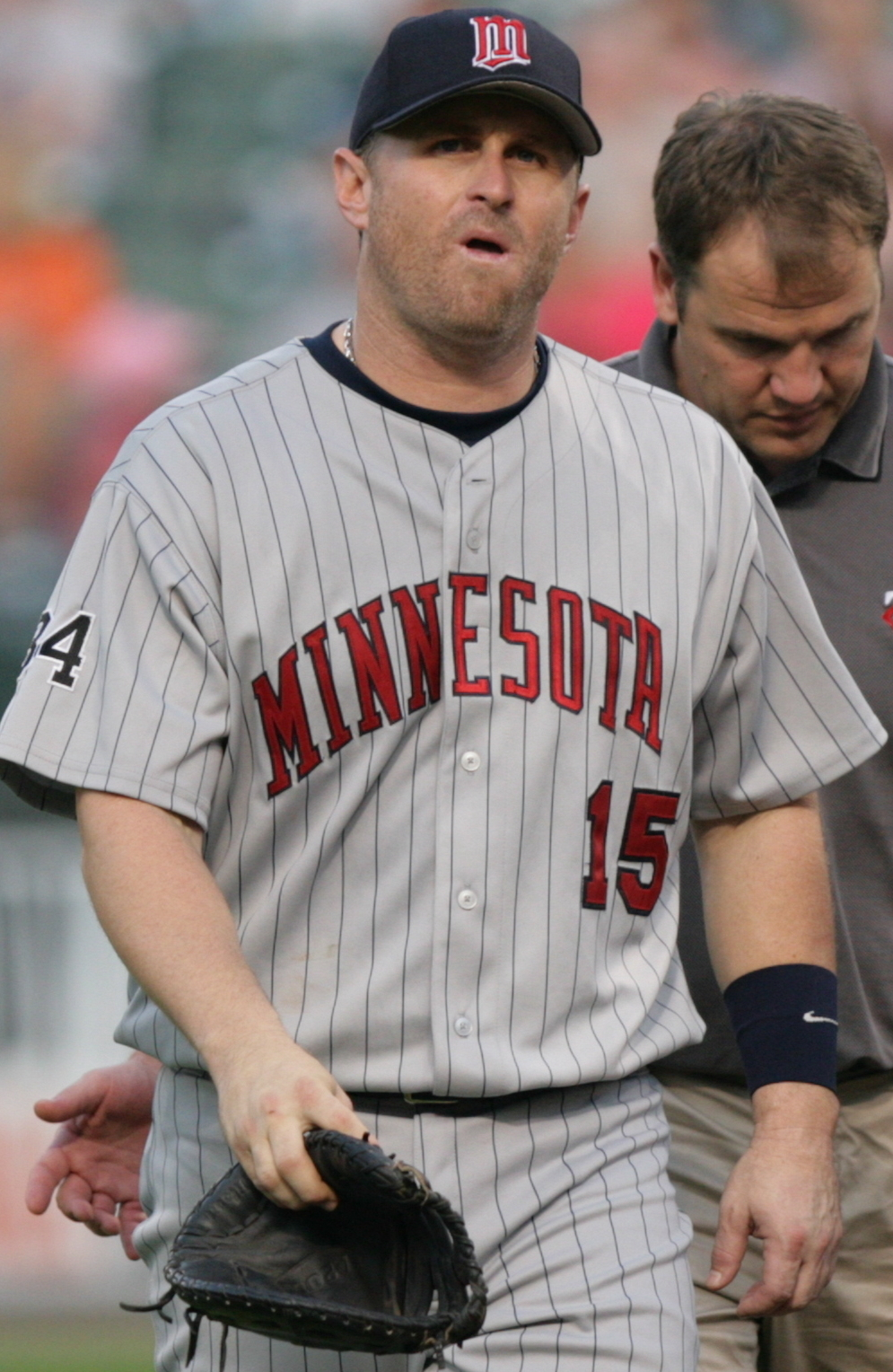
- Nevin with the Minnesota Twins in 2006
- Third baseman / First baseman / Manager
- Born: January 19, 1971 (age 55); Fullerton, California, U.S.
- Batted: Right Threw: Right

MLB debut
- June 11, 1995, for the Houston Astros

Last MLB appearance
- September 29, 2006, for the Minnesota Twins

MLB statistics
- Batting average: .270
- Home runs: 208
- Runs batted in: 743
- Managerial record: 119–149
- Winning %: .444
- Stats at Baseball Reference

Teams
- As player: Houston Astros (1995); Detroit Tigers (1995–1997); Anaheim Angels (1998); San Diego Padres (1999–2005); Texas Rangers (2005–2006); Chicago Cubs (2006); Minnesota Twins (2006); As manager: Los Angeles Angels (2022–2023); As coach: San Francisco Giants (2017); New York Yankees (2018–2021); Los Angeles Angels (2022)

Career highlights and awards
- All-Star (2001); Golden Spikes Award (1992)

Phillip Joseph Nevin (born January 19, 1971) is an American professional baseball coach, and former infielder. He was also the manager for the Los Angeles Angels of Major League Baseball (MLB) from 2022 to 2023. He played in MLB for 12 seasons, appearing in 1,217 games played between 1995 and 2006 for the Houston Astros, Detroit Tigers, Anaheim Angels, San Diego Padres, Texas Rangers, Chicago Cubs and Minnesota Twins. He has previously served as a coach in MLB for the San Francisco Giants and New York Yankees.

Nevin attended California State University, Fullerton, where he played college baseball and college football, as a kicker, for the Cal State Fullerton Titans team. Nevin led the Titans to the championship game in the 1992 College World Series (CWS), after which he was named the CWS Most Outstanding Player and won the Golden Spikes Award. Chosen with the first-overall pick in the 1992 Major League Baseball draft, Nevin went on to play in MLB for seven teams across 12 seasons. He was selected to appear in the 2001 Major League Baseball All-Star Game.

After retiring from baseball, Nevin went into broadcasting, and then managed the unaffiliated Orange County Flyers for a season. He managed the Class AA Erie SeaWolves and the Class AAA Toledo Mud Hens in the Tigers organization before joining the Arizona Diamondbacks organization in 2014, managing the Reno Aces. He then returned to MLB to coach the Giants in 2017 and for the Yankees from 2018 through 2021. He joined the Angels as a coach in 2022 and became interim manager after the firing of Joe Maddon. On October 5, 2022, the Angels signed him to a one-year contract as their permanent manager.

== Early life ==
Nevin attended El Dorado High School in Placentia, California. After graduating, he was selected by the Los Angeles Dodgers in the third round of the 1989 Major League Baseball draft with the 82nd overall selection. He decided to attend California State University, Fullerton after turning down an offer that included a signing bonus of $100,000.

== College career ==
A two-sport star, Nevin played American football and baseball for the Cal State Fullerton Titans, competing in the Big West Conference of NCAA Division I. He was a punter and placekicker on the Cal State Fullerton Titans football team. He was named an All-American placekicker his freshman year for the Titans as he connected successfully on his first nine field goal attempts and finished the year with a 15-for-21 field goal percentage. His longest field goal of the season was 54 yards (49 m). In his junior year, he averaged 40.9 yards (37.4 m) per punt.

For the Cal State Fullerton Titans baseball team, Nevin batted .358 with 56 runs batted in (RBIs) as a freshman. The Titans won the conference championship and reached the 1990 College World Series (CWS) that year. The Titans lost two games in the 1990 CWS, however, and were eliminated. Nevin batted .335 in his sophomore season. As a junior, he batted .391 with 20 home runs and 71 RBIs, winning the Big West Conference Triple Crown. Collegiate Baseball and Baseball America named Nevin the College Player of the Year. He credited his past CWS experience with allowing him to remain calm.

In three seasons at Cal State Fullerton, Nevin had a .364 average with 39 home runs and 184 RBIs. He led the Titans to the finals of the 1992 CWS, where the Titans lost to the Pepperdine Waves baseball team, which represented the West Coast Conference. Despite the loss, Nevin was voted the CWS Most Outstanding Player after he batted 10-for-19 with two home runs and 11 RBIs. He also won the Golden Spikes Award, given to the best amateur player in the nation.

=== International career ===
In 1990, Nevin tried out for the United States national baseball team to play in that year's Goodwill Games and World University Baseball Championship (WUBC). To prepare for those tournaments, the team played a series against Japan and a game in Cuba. Nevin played second and third base for Team USA in 13 of its 22 games, batting .229. The team released him before the Goodwill Games and WUBC as it cut players to meet the roster maximum. Nevin was also considered for the 1991 Pan American Games.

Nevin tried out for the national team again before the 1992 Summer Olympics in Barcelona. The team embarked on a 30-game tour and 38-city exhibition-game schedule in the United States before leaving for Spain. He made the team and served as its starting third baseman throughout the tournament. Olympic coach Ron Fraser called Nevin an excellent player and student of the game. The United States finished fourth out of eight teams in the Olympics.

== Professional career ==
=== Draft and minor leagues ===
"I realize the [Houston] Astros aren't the Oakland A's, the New York Yankees or [Toronto] Blue Jays. I just think we'll settle on something fair. It won't be a record-setting deal. It will just be fair so I can get out and play some baseball".

— Nevin after being selected by the Astros with the first overall pick of the 1992 MLB draft.

The Houston Astros chose Nevin with the first overall pick in the 1992 Major League Baseball draft. Hal Newhouser, a scout for the Astros, had evaluated Derek Jeter extensively prior to the draft. Convinced that Jeter would anchor a winning team, Newhouser lobbied team management to select Jeter, and quit in protest over the Astros' decision to take Nevin instead. The Astros believed that Jeter would insist on a signing bonus of at least $1 million to forgo his college scholarship for a professional contract. Signing bonuses given to the best player in the draft were increasing rapidly. Todd Van Poppel, regarded by many at the time as the best player of the 1990 MLB draft, signed for $1.2 million, while the 1991 MLB draft's first pick, Brien Taylor, signed for $1.55 million after insisting he would otherwise enroll in college. Meanwhile, the Astros were unable to sign their first-round draft pick in 1991, John Burke, who insisted on a bonus of $500,000 as the sixth overall selection. Consequently, the Astros passed on Jeter in the draft.

Bill Wood, the Astros' general manager, said the team believed Nevin was close to a major-league level and would require little development in minor league baseball. As evidence for this, the Astros pointed to Nevin's training with the wooden bats used in professional baseball in an effort to prepare himself for the transition from metal bats. The Astros believed he would be a solid power hitter and have a strong work ethic. Nevin also did not intend to seek a signing bonus approaching those received by Van Poppel and Taylor. The Astros decided to employ Nevin as a third baseman. Not wanting to draw out his contract negotiations, Nevin signed with Houston in June, receiving a $700,000 bonus.

Nevin traveled with the Astros at the end of their 1992 season but was not on the team's roster. The Astros sent Nevin to the instructional Arizona Fall League during the off-season. Before the 1993 season, Baseball America ranked Nevin as the 30th-best prospect in baseball.

The Astros considered sending Nevin to the Jackson Generals of the Class AA Texas League to start his professional career. The team also considered promoting him directly to the major leagues, skipping the minor leagues entirely. At the Astros' spring training in 1993, Nevin batted .350 and showed good power hitting. The Astros weighed bringing Nevin to Houston for Opening Day as they sought to add a right-handed batter to complement the left-handed power of Luis Gonzalez, Steve Finley and Eric Anthony and make the team less vulnerable to left-handed pitching. But with Ken Caminiti in the first year of a three-year contract to play as the starting third baseman, Nevin had nowhere to play defensively. The Astros assigned him to the Class AAA Tucson Toros of the Pacific Coast League, one level below the major leagues, where he made his professional debut.

While Nevin was with the Toros, the Astros asked Toros manager Rick Sweet to play Nevin as a left fielder, which would allow the Astros to promote Nevin sooner, as he and Caminiti could play different positions. Veteran first baseman Jim Lindeman served as Nevin's mentor, helping him keep his composure under significant attention and pressure to perform. Nevin started the 1993 season with a .247 batting average, but batted .309 with baserunners in scoring position and had 49 RBIs. By July, he had made ten starts in left field, without committing an error. The Astros, however, were concerned that Nevin did not apply the level of intensity he had in "clutch" situations to cases where there were no baserunners and the score was not close.

Nevin's intensity almost got the best of him during a June 1993 game with Tucson. He was taunted by a man seated in the front row, and nearly attempted to jump into the stands to confront the fan before he was restrained by teammates. The fan was arrested.

Nevin played third base and left field in 1993. He batted .286 that season, with 10 home runs and 91 RBIs. He had a .359 on-base percentage (OBP) and .413 slugging percentage (SLG). Baseball America rated him the 24th best prospect before the 1994 season. He returned to Tucson that year, posting a .263 batting average with 12 home runs and 71 RBIs. He had a .343 OBP, and .393 SLG. Nevin also played first base. His major-league debut, however, was delayed both by his defense (61 errors in his first two seasons) and the MLB 1994–95 work stoppage.

"I wouldn't say that he was a disappointment. His attitude left something to be desired, but we don't question whether he has the ability to play in the big leagues. He does."

— Bob Watson

The Astros traded Caminiti to the San Diego Padres before the 1995 season. With Caminiti no longer blocking his path to the major leagues, Nevin hoped he would be named the Astros' starting third baseman. But the Astros did not invite him to spring training. Nevin attributed the snub to his refusal to work out with replacement players during the work stoppage. Not wanting to be seen as "scabs" by the Major League Baseball Players Association, minor league players who felt they would play in MLB after the resolution of the strike felt pressure to avoid playing with replacement players, while career minor-leaguers were happy to get a taste of the major leagues. When prospects including Nevin and Billy Wagner refused to play with the replacement players, Astros' general manager Bob Watson issued an ultimatum, saying anyone who refused to play in the team's first exhibition game would be sent out of camp until further notice and be held in breach of contract. The Astros sent Nevin back to Tucson to start the 1995 season, while Dave Magadan started at third base on Opening Day. The Astros also planned to use Shipley and Chris Donnels at third base.

With the Toros in 1995, Nevin's batting average improved to .291. He also posted a .367 OBP, and .463 SLG, while contributing seven home runs and 41 RBIs.

=== Houston Astros (1995) ===
The Astros promoted him on June 10, 1995, and he made his major-league debut a day later. Nevin played 18 games for the Astros during the 1995 season. He struggled with the Astros, however, batting .117 with no home run, one RBI, a .221 OBP, and .133 SLG in 60 at-bats. When he learned of his demotion to Tucson on July 5 in Colorado, Nevin cursed at Watson and Astros manager Terry Collins. After Watson called for an apology, Nevin said he would use the incident as a learning experience in controlling his temper.

=== Detroit Tigers (1995–1997) ===
The Astros acquired pitcher Mike Henneman from the Detroit Tigers for a player to be named later on August 10; Nevin was identified as the player five days later. In 1996, Nevin played in Class AA for the Tigers with the Jacksonville Suns of the Southern League, where he was converted into a catcher by Jacksonville manager and former catcher Bill Plummer.

=== Anaheim Angels (1998) ===
After the 1997 season, the Tigers traded Nevin and catcher Matt Walbeck to the Anaheim Angels, where Collins was manager, for minor league player Nick Skuse. After an injury to starting catcher Todd Greene, Collins gave Nevin the opportunity to compete for the starting job with Walbeck. Nevin, by then well known for his volatile temper, tore off his jersey while arguing balls and strike calls with the home plate umpire in a 1998 game.

=== San Diego Padres (1999–2005) ===
Before the 1999 season, the Angels traded Nevin and minor league player Keith Volkman to the San Diego Padres. Nevin made a late-career break with the Padres, appearing in 100 games for the first time during the 1999 season. He then had the best offensive years of his career: he hit 31 home runs with a .916 on-base plus slugging (OPS) during the 2000 season. He was named to the National League All-Star team in 2001, when he hit 41 home runs with 126 RBIs and had a .976 OPS. He also led major-league third basemen in errors, however, with 27, and had the lowest fielding percentage of all major league third basemen (.930).

In 2002 Nevin played first base, which was considered his strongest defensive position. But injuries shortened his 2002 and 2003 seasons. In 2002, he missed time with a strained left elbow. Three games after returning from the elbow injury, he broke his arm diving for a ground ball, causing him to miss another six weeks. After being heckled by a fan during a September 2002 game, Nevin gave the fan the finger, for which he apologized.

Nevin suffered a dislocated shoulder in spring training in 2003 while making a diving catch. He had surgery on his left shoulder and returned to the Padres in June. The Padres acquired Rondell White to replace Nevin, and White went on to have an All-Star season in left field. Ryan Klesko filled in at first base and rookie Sean Burroughs played well at third base, Nevin's favorite position. Nevin offered to be used in a utility role, alternating with White, Klesko, and Burroughs, as well as Xavier Nady in right field. In 2004, Nevin had more than 100 RBIs for the third time in his career, but underwent arthroscopic surgery to repair torn cartilage in his right knee in July.

Nevin was often frustrated with the dimensions of Petco Park. He hit a double during a 2004 game that he believed would have been a home run in other stadiums; when he reached second base, he pointed toward Padres' general manager Kevin Towers' suite and threw down his helmet, resulting in a postgame argument. At the time, Petco Park had dimensions of 403 feet for left-center and 411 for right center (each would be shifted by at least ten feet eight years later). Towers said the two had a "love-hate" relationship.

"I've had a heckuva lot of ups and downs, and this obviously isn't one of the up times."

— Nevin in 2005

Two nights after San Diego Padres management informed Nevin that Xavier Nady would replace him as the starting first baseman, Nevin rejected a trade to the Baltimore Orioles for Sidney Ponson on July 25, 2005. Nevin exercised a clause in his contract that gave him the right to block transactions that would send him to any of eight franchises, one of which was the Orioles.

=== Texas Rangers (2005–2006) ===
He was instead traded on July 30, a day before the non-waiver trade deadline, to the Texas Rangers for Chan Ho Park, whose salary the Rangers wanted to dump. In his first thirteen games with the Rangers, the team posted a 1–12 record as Nevin batted 5-for-44. That put his season batting average under .200, known as the "Mendoza Line". The Rangers benched Nevin in September, giving his starts to prospect first baseman Adrián González after the team was eliminated from playoff contention. In his first game back in the lineup on September 24, his average dropped to .182. He refuted opinions that he was losing bat speed.

Nevin had one year remaining on a contract worth $9 million. Manager Buck Showalter said that despite Nevin's benching at the end of the 2005 season, he was his starting designated hitter for the 2006 season. Despite hopes that help from renowned hitting coach Rudy Jaramillo and the hitter-friendly Ameriquest Field would increase Nevin's offensive production in 2006, he continued to struggle. He batted .216 with nine home runs and 31 RBIs in 46 games. The Rangers promoted rookie Jason Botts on May 23, and Botts began to receive Nevin's playing time.

Nevin had only two hits in his last 32 at-bats with the Rangers, though both of them were home runs.

=== Chicago Cubs (2006) ===
The Chicago Cubs sought a slugging first baseman to replace the injured Derrek Lee, and the Rangers traded Nevin to Chicago on May 31, 2006. The Rangers received second baseman and outfielder Jerry Hairston Jr. in return. The Rangers also agreed to pay the difference in the two players' salaries.

=== Minnesota Twins (2006) ===
On August 31, the deadline for trades of players who had cleared waivers, the Cubs traded Nevin to the Minnesota Twins for cash and a player to be named later. To make room for Nevin, Twins' outfielder Shannon Stewart was placed on the 60-day disabled list.

With the Twins, Nevin stopped worrying about his statistics and enjoyed playing in a pennant race. Nevin appeared in the MLB postseason for the first time in his career with the Twins in 2006. The Twins were swept by the Oakland Athletics in three games; Nevin appeared in one of the three games, batting 0-for-3.

Unsigned at the beginning of the 2007 season, Nevin announced his retirement on May 12, 2007. During his twelve-season career, Nevin had a .270 batting average with 208 home runs and 743 RBIs in 1,217 games. After retiring, Nevin joined the Padres' pre-game radio show. He also joined ESPN as an analyst for the college baseball regionals during the College World Series.

== Coaching career ==
Two seasons removed from his playing career, Nevin decided to return to baseball as a manager in 2008. That December, he was named the manager of the Orange County Flyers in the independent Golden Baseball League (GBL). The Flyers finished with a 37–39 record in 2009, fourth in the five-team GBL. Nevin planned to return to the Flyers in 2010, but a chance meeting at baseball's winter meetings led to Nevin's hiring as manager of the Erie SeaWolves, the Class-AA minor-league affiliate of the Detroit Tigers. He replaced the previous manager, Tom Brookens after Brookens was promoted to the Tigers' major-league first-base coach.

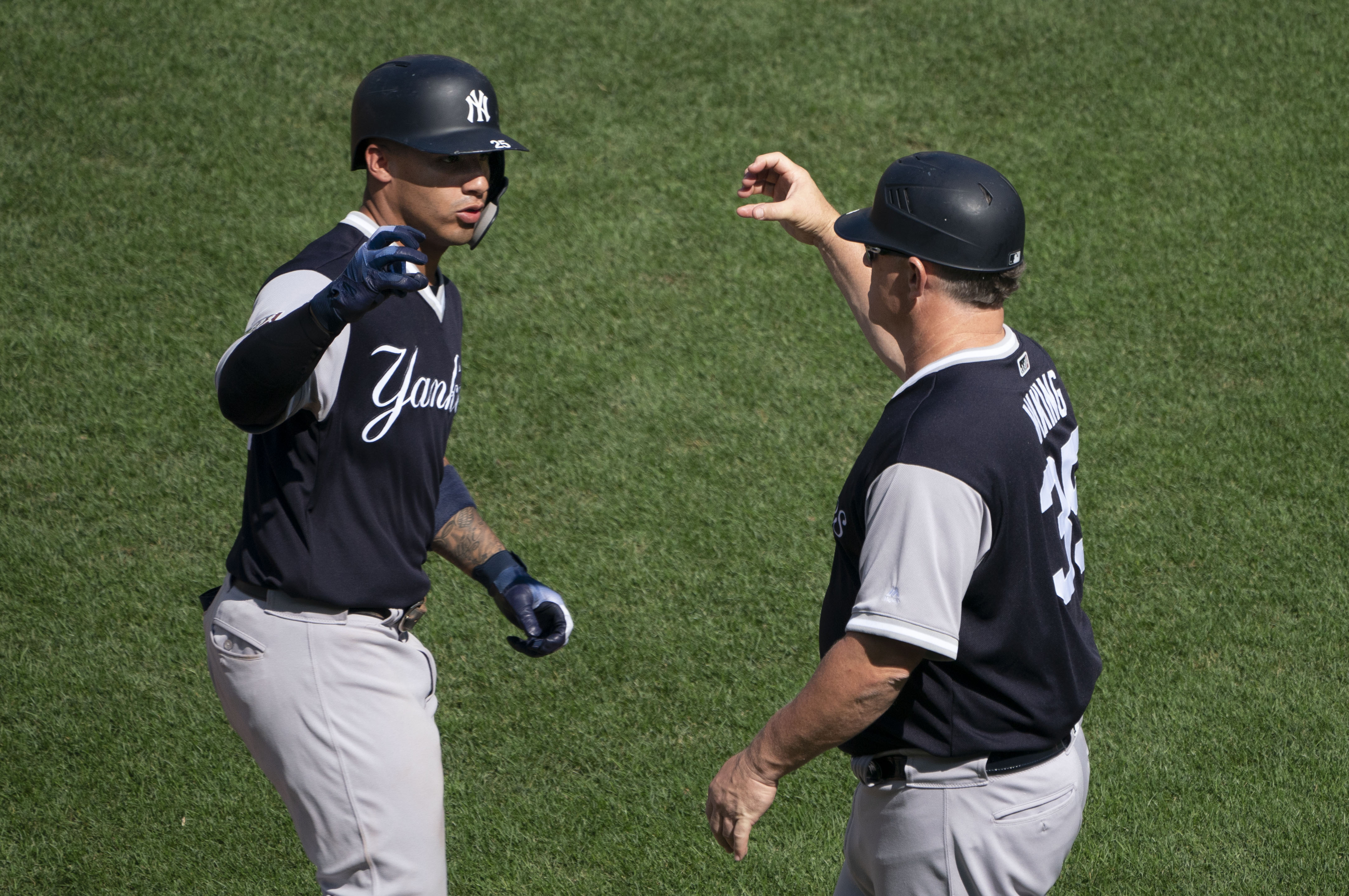
Nevin (right) with Gleyber Torres in 2018

Nevin managed the SeaWolves for one season. On November 11, 2010, Nevin was named manager of the Toledo Mud Hens, the Tigers' Class AAA minor league affiliate, and began to be considered as a potential future MLB manager. Catcher Omir Santos described his managing the Mud Hens as "like having a big league manager in [Class AAA]." Nevin had his first taste of coaching in the big leagues when he was added to Jim Leyland's staff as an extra coach for the Tigers 2011 playoff run. On August 31, 2013, Nevin was fired after the team's final home game of the season. Nevin's record as manager was 192–238; the team never finished higher than third in the International League's West division.

The Arizona Diamondbacks named Nevin as manager of the Reno Aces, their Class AAA affiliate, for the 2014 season. In his first season with Reno, he guided the Aces to a Pacific Coast League-best 81–63 record and an eventual Pacific Coast League Championship Series berth. After the season, the Astros interviewed Nevin for their open managerial position. However Nevin remained the manager of the Reno Aces for the 2015 and 2016 seasons.

On November 7, 2016, the San Francisco Giants named Nevin their third-base coach for the 2017 season, succeeding Roberto Kelly. After the 2017 season, the New York Yankees hired Nevin to be their third base coach. The Yankees did not renew his contract for the 2022 season.

=== Los Angeles Angels ===
On November 29, 2021, Nevin was hired by the Los Angeles Angels to serve as the team's third base coach for the 2022 season. On June 7, 2022, following the firing of Joe Maddon, Nevin was named the Angels' interim manager. On the same day, Nevin managed his first game, but lost to the Boston Red Sox 6–5. On June 9, 2022, the Angels defeated the Red Sox 5–2, giving Nevin his first major league win as a manager as well as snapping the team's 14-game losing streak. On June 27, 2022, Nevin was suspended 10 games for the intentional throwing at Seattle Mariners outfielder Jesse Winker by Angels pitcher Andrew Wantz while warnings were in place during a game against the Mariners the previous day.

On October 5, 2022, the Angels retained Nevin as the team's permanent manager for the 2023 season. In 2023, in a game between the Los Angeles Angels and the New York Yankees, he was ejected from the game twice during the ninth inning with the score locked at 2–2 (the second umpire was unaware he'd been ejected by his fellow ump moments earlier). The Yankees would go on to win the game 3–2 in the 10th innings. After finishing the 2023 season with a 73–89 (.451) record, the Angels announced that Nevin would not return to the organization for the 2024 season.

== Managerial record ==
As of games played on October 2nd, 2023.

Team	Year	Regular season					Postseason			
Team	Year	Games	Won	Lost	Win %	Finish	Won	Lost	Win %	Result
LAA	2022	106	46	60	.434	3rd in AL West	–	–	–	–
LAA	2023	162	73	89	.451	4th in AL West	–	–	–	–
Total		268	119	149	.444				–	

== Personal life ==
Nevin was diagnosed with asthma at two years old. Nevin was hospitalized and treated for asthma five times between 1987 and May 1990, each stay lasting about five days. Nevin is also allergic to grass. At 19 years old, he told the Los Angeles Times that he had half the lung capacity of a typical 17-year-old.

Nevin's first daughter, Koral, was born during his freshman year at Cal State Fullerton; he is no longer in a relationship with Koral's mother. He met his wife, Kristin, at Cal State Fullerton. The couple have two children together; though they were separated during the late 1990s, the couple reconciled. His son, Tyler, made his MLB debut with the Baltimore Orioles in 2021. Another son, Kyle, played college baseball for Baylor University and was drafted by the Los Angeles Dodgers in the 2022 MLB draft.

Nevin lives in the Heritage Estates neighborhood of Poway, California, along with San Diego sporting figures including Bruce Bochy and LaDainian Tomlinson. The neighborhood suffered significant damage in the October 2007 California wildfires. Nevin hosted a baseball camp for children aged six through 16 in 2010.

On May 11, 2021, the Yankees announced that Nevin had tested positive for COVID-19. He also developed a staph infection, and lost 20 pounds (9.1 kg).

== See also ==
- 1992 College Baseball All-America Team
- Golden Spikes Award

Sporting positions
Preceded by Roberto Kelly	San Francisco Giants third base coach 2017	Succeeded by Ron Wotus
Preceded by Joe Espada	New York Yankees third base coach 2018–2021	Succeeded by Luis Rojas
Preceded by Brian Butterfield	Los Angeles Angels third base coach 2022	Succeeded by Mike Gallego
