= John Vrooman (baseball) =

American baseball coach

Playing career
- ?-1964: Wesleyan University

Coaching career (HC unless noted)
- 1974–1977: USC Coastal
- 1987-1994: Coastal Carolina

Head coaching record
- Overall: 366–276
- Tournaments: NCAA: 0–2; Big South: 14–8

Accomplishments and honors

Championships
- Regular Season Big South Champion (1989, 1990, 1991, 1992, 1993); Big South Tournament Champion (1991, 1992)

Awards
- NAIA Southeastern Region Coach (1977); Big South Coach of the Year (1988, 1990); Sasser Hall of Fame Member; Big South Conference Hall of Fame

John Vrooman is an American college baseball coach who was the first head coach of the Coastal Carolina Chanticleers. He first held the position at the start of the 1974 season until 1977. He was then hired again 1987 season. He would hold stay head coach until the 1995 season, being replaced by Gary Gilmore after retiring in 1995.

== Head coaching record ==
Statistics overview
Season	Team	Overall	Conference	Standing	Postseason
USC Coastal (NAIA) (1974–1977)
1974	USC Coastal	20–10			
1975	USC Coastal	21–19			
1976	USC Coastal	14–20			
1977	USC Coastal	32-13			
NAIA:		87–62			
Coastal Carolina Chanticleers (Big South Conference) (1987–1995)
1987	Coastal Carolina	27-23	7-6	2nd (West)	
1988	Coastal Carolina	35-12	15-0	1st	
1989	Coastal Carolina	33-13	15-3	1st	
1990	Coastal Carolina	40-19	14-2	1st	
1991	Coastal Carolina	36-29	15-5	1st	NCAA regional
1992	Coastal Carolina	33-27	13-5	1st	
1993	Coastal Carolina	28-28	15-8	1st	
1994	Coastal Carolina	30-26	18-9	2nd	
1995	Coastal Carolina	17-37	6-17	8th	
NCAA Division 1:		252–214	118-55		
Total:		366–276			
National champion Postseason invitational champion Conference regular season champion Conference regular season and conference tournament champion Division regular season champion Division regular season and conference tournament champion Conference tournament champion
