= 1992 NCAA Division I baseball tournament =

- Season: 1992
- Teams: 48
- Finals site: Johnny Rosenblatt Stadium; Omaha, NE
- Champions: Pepperdine (1st title)
- Runner-up: Cal State Fullerton (4th CWS Appearance)
- Winning coach: Andy Lopez (1st title)
- MOP: Phil Nevin (Cal State Fullerton)

The 1992 NCAA Division I baseball tournament was played at the end of the 1992 NCAA Division I baseball season to determine the national champion of college baseball. The tournament concluded with eight teams competing in the College World Series, a double-elimination tournament in its forty sixth year. Eight regional competitions were held to determine the participants in the final event. Each region was composed of six teams, resulting in 48 teams participating in the tournament at the conclusion of their regular season, and in some cases, after a conference tournament. The forty-sixth tournament's champion was Pepperdine, coached by Andy Lopez. The Most Outstanding Player was Phil Nevin of Cal State Fullerton. As of 2024, this is the last tournament in which no SEC teams have managed to advance to the College World Series.

== Regionals ==
The opening rounds of the tournament were played across eight regional sites across the country, each consisting of a six-team field. Each regional tournament is double-elimination, however region brackets are variable depending on the number of teams remaining after each round. The winners of each regional advanced to the College World Series.

Bold indicates winner.

=== Atlantic Regional ===
at Coral Gables, FL

First round
1	**Miami (FL)**	**3**
6	UMBC	1
2	**NC State**	**6**
5	Delaware	2
3	**South Carolina**	**5**
4	Notre Dame	1

Second round
1	Miami (FL)	3
4	**Notre Dame**	**6**
6	UMBC	5
5	**Delaware**	**6**^{10}
2	NC State	6
3	**South Carolina**	**9**
1	**Miami (FL)**	**5**
2	NC State	4

Third round
4	**Notre Dame**	**12**
5	Delaware	6
3	South Carolina	2
1	**Miami (FL)**	**17**

Semifinals
4	**Notre Dame**	**11**
3	South Carolina	2

Final
4	Notre Dame	1
1	**Miami (FL)**	**5**

=== Central Regional ===
at Austin, TX

First round
1	**Texas**	**2**
6	VCU	0
2	**Long Beach State**	**7**
5	Southwestern Louisiana	6
3	**Creighton**	**11**
4	Texas–Arlington	6

Second round
1	**Texas**	**17**
4	Texas–Arlington	1
2	**Long Beach State**	**5**
3	Creighton	2
6	**VCU**	**12**
5	Southwestern Louisiana	5

Third round
1	**Texas**	**9**
2	Long Beach State	1
3	Creighton	4
6	**VCU**	**5**^{11}

Semifinals
2	Long Beach State	6
6	**VCU**	**16**

Final
1	**Texas**	2	**12**
6	VCU	**4**	3

=== East Regional ===
at Gainesville, FL

First round
1	**Florida**	**6**
6	Rider	1
2	**Georgia Tech**	**5**
5	George Mason	4
3	**Texas A&M**	**15**
4	California	6

Second round
1	Florida	3
4	**California**	**4**^{10}
6	Rider	2
5	**George Mason**	**10**
2	**Georgia Tech**	**3**^{10}
3	Texas A&M	2
1	Florida	5
3	**Texas A&M**	**6**

Third round
4	**California**	**16**
5	George Mason	5
2	Georgia Tech	5
3	**Texas A&M**	**7**

Semifinals
4	**California**	**3**
2	Georgia Tech	2

Final
4	**California**	**11**
3	Texas A&M	4

=== Mideast Regional ===
at Starkville, MS4

First round
1	**Clemson**	**8**
6	Yale	4
2	**Mississippi State**	**1**^{11}
5	Nicholls State	0
3	**Oklahoma**	**4**^{13}
4	UCLA	3

Second round
1	Clemson	5
4	**UCLA**	**6**
6	**Yale**	**13**
5	Nicholls State	4
2	**Mississippi State**	**9**
3	Oklahoma	6
1	Clemson	6
3	**Oklahoma**	**7**

Third round
4	**UCLA**	**8**
6	Yale	0
2	Mississippi State	6
3	**Oklahoma**	**9**

Semifinals
4	**UCLA**	**3**
2	Mississippi State	2

Final
4	UCLA	0
3	**Oklahoma**	**10**

=== Midwest Regional ===
at Wichita, KS

First round
1	**Wichita State**	**9**
6	George Washington	0
2	**Oklahoma State**	**12**
5	Minnesota	11
3	**Cal State Northridge**	**5**
4	Arizona State	1

Second round
1	**Wichita State**	**3**
4	Arizona State	1
2	**Oklahoma State**	**5**
3	Cal State Northridge	0
6	George Washington	3
5	**Minnesota**	**19**

Third round
1	**Wichita State**	**5**
2	Oklahoma State	0
3	Cal State Northridge	6
5	**Minnesota**	**7**

Semifinals
2	**Oklahoma State**	**15**
5	Minnesota	6

Final
1	**Wichita State**	**5**	–
2	Oklahoma State	2	–

=== South Regional ===
at Baton Rouge, LA

First round
1	**LSU**	**8**
6	Providence	1
2	South Alabama	2
5	**Tulane**	**4**
3	**Cal State Fullerton**	**3**
4	Ohio State	2

Second round
1	LSU	0
4	**Ohio State**	**5**
6	**Providence**	**4**
2	South Alabama	0
5	Tulane	0
3	**Cal State Fullerton**	**8**
1	**LSU**	**7**
5	Tulane	3

Third round
4	**Ohio State**	**7**^{12}
6	Providence	6
3	**Cal State Fullerton**	**11**
1	LSU	0

Final
4	Ohio State	1	—
3	**Cal State Fullerton**	**13**	—

=== South II Regional ===
at Tallahassee, FL

First round
1	**Stanford**	**2**^{12}
6	Stetson	1
2	Florida State	0
5	**Western Carolina**	**1**
3	Georgia	2
4	**Kent State**	**5**

Second round
1	**Stanford**	**7**
3	Georgia	3
5	**Western Carolina**	**14**
4	Kent State	1
6	Stetson	0
2	**Florida State**	**2**

Third round
1	Stanford	0
5	**Western Carolina**	**5**
4	Kent State	2
2	**Florida State**	**4**

Semifinals
1	Stanford	4
2	**Florida State**	**9**

Final
5	Western Carolina	3	3
2	**Florida State**	**4**	**18**

=== West Regional ===
at Tucson, AZ

First round
1	Arizona	5
6	**Washington**	**6**
2	Hawaii	0
5	**SE Louisiana**	**8**
3	**Pepperdine**	**5**^{10}
4	Fresno State	4

Second round
6	**Washington**	**4**
4	Fresno State	3
5	SE Louisiana	5
3	**Pepperdine**	**8**
1	Arizona	3
2	**Hawaii**	**10**

Third round
6	Washington	0
3	**Pepperdine**	**11**
5	SE Louisiana	3
2	**Hawaii**	**10**

Semifinals
6	Washington	3
2	**Hawaii**	**9**

Final
3	**Pepperdine**	3	**9**
2	Hawaii	**6**	0

== College World Series ==
Through the 2025 event, this was the last time a Southeastern Conference team did not reach the College World Series.

=== Participants ===
Seeding	School	Conference	Record (conference)	Head coach	CWS appearances	CWS best finish	CWS record
1	Miami (FL)	n/a	53–8 (n/a)	Ron Fraser	11 (last: 1989)	1st (1982, 1985)	24–19
2	Wichita State	MVC	56–9 (18–3)	Gene Stephenson	4 (last: 1991)	1st (1989)	13–6
3	Texas	SWC	46–15 (28–8)	Cliff Gustafson	25 (last: 1989)	1st (1949, 1950, 1975, 1983)	61–43
4	Cal State Fullerton	Big West	42–15 (17–7)	Augie Garrido	6 (last: 1990)	1st (1979, 1984)	12–10
5	Florida State	ACC	48–19 (16–7)	Mike Martin	11 (last: 1991)	2nd (1970, 1986)	15–22
6	Oklahoma	Big 8	42–22 (17–7)	Larry Cochell	6 (last: 1976)	1st (1951)	9–10
7	Pepperdine	WCC	44–11–1 (23–4)	Andy Lopez	1 (last: 1979)	3rd (1979)	3–2
8	California	Pac-10	35–26 (14–16)	Bob Milano	4 (last: 1988)	1st (1947, 1957)	10–4

=== Results ===
==== Bracket ====
The teams in the CWS are divided into two pools of four, with each pool playing a double-elimination format. The winners of the two pools meet in the National Championship game.

First round
1	Miami (FL)	4^{13}
8	California	3
4	Cal State Fullerton	7
5	Florida State	2
8	California	4
5	Florida State	5
2	Wichita State	0
7	Pepperdine	6
3	Texas	15
6	Oklahoma	3
2	Wichita State	4
6	Oklahoma	8

Second round
1	Miami (FL)	4
4	Cal State Fullerton	3
5	Florida State	0
4	Cal State Fullerton	6
7	Pepperdine	7
3	Texas	0
6	Oklahoma	5
3	Texas	8

Semifinals
1	Miami (FL)	5	1
4	Cal State Fullerton	7	8
7	Pepperdine	5	—
3	Texas	4	—

Finals
4	Cal State Fullerton	2
7	Pepperdine	3

==== Game results ====
Date	Game	Winner	Score	Loser	Notes
May 29	Game 1	Miami (FL)	4–3 (13 innings)	California	
May 29	Game 2	Cal State Fullerton	7–2	Florida State	
May 30	Game 3	Pepperdine	6–0	Wichita State	
May 30	Game 4	Texas	15–3	Oklahoma	
May 31	Game 5	Florida State	5–4	California	California eliminated
May 31	Game 6	Miami (FL)	4–3	Cal State Fullerton	
June 1	Game 7	Oklahoma	8–4	Wichita State	Wichita State eliminated
June 1	Game 8	Pepperdine	7–0	Texas	
June 2	Game 9	Cal State Fullerton	6–0	Florida State	Florida State eliminated
June 2	Game 10	Texas	8–5	Oklahoma	Oklahoma eliminated
June 3	Game 11	Cal State Fullerton	7–5	Miami (FL)	
June 4	Game 12	Pepperdine	5–4	Texas	Texas eliminated
June 5	Game 13	Cal State Fullerton	8–1	Miami (FL)	Miami (FL) eliminated
June 6	Final	Pepperdine	3–2	Cal State Fullerton	Pepperdine wins CWS

== All-Tournament Team ==
The following players were members of the College World Series All-Tournament Team.

Position	Player	School
P	Pat Ahearne	Pepperdine
P	James Popoff	Cal State Fullerton
C	Scott Vollmer	Pepperdine
1B	Dan Melendez	Pepperdine
2B	Steve Rodriguez	Pepperdine
3B	Phil Nevin (MOP)	Cal State Fullerton
SS	Nate Rodriquez	Cal State Fullerton
OF	Byron Mathews	Oklahoma
OF	Chris Powell	Cal State Fullerton
OF	Johnathen Smith	Miami (FL)
DH	Brooks Kieschnick	Texas

=== Notable players ===
- Cal State Fullerton: Bret Hemphill, Dan Naulty, Phil Nevin, Dante Powell, Steve Sisco
- California: Geoff Blum, Mike Cather, Chris Clapinski, Eric Ludwick, Matt Luke, Jon Zuber
- Florida State: Roger Bailey, Chris Brock, Tim Davis, John Wasdin, Paul Wilson
- Miami (FL): Dave Berg, Gus Gandarillas, Danny Graves, Charles Johnson
- Oklahoma: Greg Norton
- Pepperdine: Pat Ahearne, Steve Montgomery, Steve Rodriguez, Derek Wallace, Mark Wasikowski
- Texas: Brooks Kieschnick, Stephen Larkin, Calvin Murray
- Wichita State: Jaime Bluma, Darren Dreifort, Doug Mirabelli, Kennie Steenstra

== See also ==
- 1992 NCAA Division I softball tournament
- 1992 NCAA Division II baseball tournament
- 1992 NCAA Division III baseball tournament
- 1992 NAIA World Series
