= 1992 NCAA Division I baseball rankings =

1992 NCAA Division I baseball season

Tournament

College World Series
- Champions: Pepperdine
- Runners-up: Cal State Fullerton
- MOP: Phil Nevin (Pepperdine)

Seasons
- ← 1991 1993 →

The following polls make up the 1992 NCAA Division I baseball rankings. USA Today and ESPN began publishing the Coaches' Poll of 31 active coaches ranking the top 25 teams in the nation in 1992. Each coach is a member of the American Baseball Coaches Association. Baseball America began publishing its poll of the top 20 teams in college baseball in 1981. Beginning with the 1985 season, it expanded to the top 25. Collegiate Baseball Newspaper published its first human poll of the top 20 teams in college baseball in 1957, and expanded to rank the top 30 teams in 1961.

== USA Today/ESPN Coaches' Poll ==
Currently, only the final poll from the 1992 season is available.

Rank	Team
1	Pepperdine
2	Cal State Fullerton
3	Miami (FL)
4	Texas
5	Wichita State
6	Florida State
7	Oklahoma
8	LSU
9	Clemson
10	California
11	Oklahoma State
12	Hawaii
13	Florida
14	Notre Dame
15	Stanford
16	NC State
17	Arizona
18	Long Beach State
19	Georgia Tech
20	Texas A&M
21	Mississippi State
22	Cal State Northridge
23	Western Carolina
24	UCLA
25	Ohio State

== Baseball America ==
Currently, only the final poll from the 1992 season is available.

Rank	Team
1	Pepperdine
2	Cal State Fullerton
3	Miami (FL)
4	Texas
5	Wichita State
6	LSU
7	Clemson
8	Oklahoma
9	Florida State
10	Oklahoma State
11	Stanford
12	Hawaii
13	Arizona
14	California
15	Notre Dame
16	Florida
17	Long Beach State
18	South Carolina
19	Texas A&M
20	NC State
21	UCLA
22	Georgia Tech
23	Western Carolina
24	VCU
25	South Alabama

== Collegiate Baseball ==
Currently, only the final poll from the 1992 season is available.

Rank	Team
1	Pepperdine
2	Cal State Fullerton
3	Miami (FL)
4	Texas
5	Florida State
6	Oklahoma
7	Wichita State
8	California
9	LSU
10	Clemson
11	Hawaii
12	Arizona
13	Oklahoma State
14	Notre Dame
15	Texas A&M
16	Florida
17	Western Carolina
18	Stanford
19	Ohio State
20	UCLA
21	Mississippi State
22	VCU
23	Long Beach State
24	Georgia Tech
25	Minnesota
26	Cal State Northridge
27	South Alabama
28	South Carolina
29	NC State
30	Creighton
