= 1975 College Baseball All-America Team =

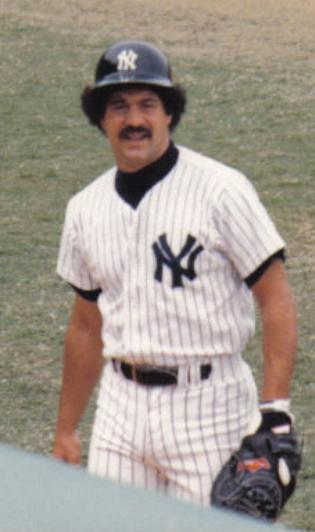
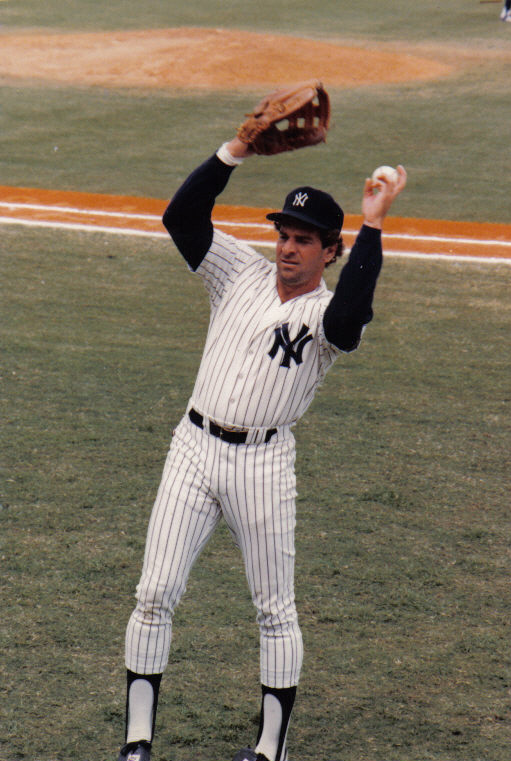
1975 All-Americans included future New York Yankees teammates Rick Cerone (left) & Steve Kemp (right).

This is a list of college baseball players named first team All-Americans for the 1975 NCAA Division I baseball season. From 1964 to 1980, there were two generally recognized All-America selectors for baseball: the American Baseball Coaches Association and The Sporting News.

== Key ==
A	American Baseball Coaches Association
S	The Sporting News
	Member of the National College Baseball Hall of Fame
	Consensus All-American – selected by both organizations
	Consensus All-American – selected by one organization

== All-Americans ==
Position	Name	School	#	A	S	Other awards and honors
Pitcher	Floyd Bannister	Arizona State	1	—	✓	
Pitcher	Earl Bass	South Carolina	1	✓	—	
Pitcher	Jim Gideon	Texas	2	✓	✓	
Catcher	Rick Cerone	Seton Hall	1	✓	—	
Catcher	Danny Goodwin	Southern	1	—	✓	The Sporting News Player of the Year First overall pick in the 1974 MLB draft
First baseman	Otis Foster	High Point	1	—	✓	
First baseman	Hank Small	South Carolina	1	✓	—	
Second baseman	Randy Duarte	Iowa State	1	✓	—	
Second baseman	Bryan Jones	Iowa	1	—	✓	
Shortstop	Bill Hiss	Queens (NY)	1	—	✓	
Shortstop	Condredge Holloway	Tennessee	1	—	✓	
Third baseman / SS	Jerry Maddox	Arizona State	2	✓	✓	
Third baseman	Keith Moreland	Texas	1	✓	—	
Outfielder	Steve Kemp	USC	2	✓	✓	
Outfielder	Dave Stegman	Arizona	2	✓	✓	
Outfielder	Dennis Walling	Clemson	2	✓	✓	
Designated hitter	George Weicker	Davidson	1	✓	—	

== See also ==
- List of college baseball awards
