= 1975 NCAA Division I baseball rankings =

1975 NCAA Division I baseball season

Tournament

College World Series
- Champions: Texas
- Runners-up: South Carolina
- MOP: Mickey Reichenbach (Texas)

Seasons
- ← 1974 1976 →

The following poll makes up the 1975 NCAA Division I baseball rankings. Collegiate Baseball Newspaper published its first human poll of the top 20 teams in college baseball in 1957, and expanded to rank the top 30 teams in 1961.

== Collegiate Baseball ==
Currently, only the final poll from the 1975 season is available.

Rank	Team
1	Texas
2	South Carolina
3	Arizona State
4	Oklahoma
5	Eastern Michigan
6	Seton Hall
7	Florida State
8	Cal State Fullerton
9	Tulsa
10	Pepperdine
11	USC
12	Miami
13	Arizona
14	Texas–Pan American
15	NC State
16	South Alabama
17	Michigan
18	St. John's
19	LSU
20	Washington State
21	Maine
22	Temple
23	Murray State
24	Southern Illinois
25	Clemson
26	Puget Sound
27	Iowa
28	The Citadel
29	BYU
30	Northern Colorado
