= 1975 Cal State Fullerton Titans baseball team =

American college baseball season

1975 Cal State Fullerton Titans baseball

PCAA champions NCAA West Regional champions

College World Series, 0–2
- Conference: Pacific Coast Athletic Association
- Record: 36–16–1 (14–7 PCAA)
- Head coach: Augie Garrido (3rd year)
- Home stadium: Titan Field

1975 Pacific Coast Athletic Association baseball standings
	Conf.						Overall
Team	W		L		T	PCT	W		L		T	PCT
No. 8 Cal State Fullerton ‍†‍‍^{y}	14	–	7	–	0	.667	36	–	16	–	1	.689
Pacific ‍‍‍	13	–	8	–	0	.619	33	–	26	–	0	.559
San Jose State ‍‍‍	9	–	9	–	0	.500	22	–	22	–	0	.500
San Diego State ‍‍‍	8	–	10	–	0	.444	22	–	25	–	0	.468
Long Beach State ‍‍‍	9	–	12	–	0	.429	30	–	20	–	0	.600
Fresno State ‍‍‍	7	–	14	–	0	.333	26	–	33	–	0	.441
† – Conference champion y – Invited to the NCAA tournament As of June 30, 1975; Rankings from Collegiate Baseball

The 1975 Cal State Fullerton Titans baseball team represented California State University, Fullerton in the 1975 NCAA Division I baseball season. The Titans played their home games at Titan Field, and played as part of the Pacific Coast Athletic Association. The team was coached by Augie Garrido in his third season as head coach at Cal State Fullerton.

The Titans reached the College World Series, their first appearance in Omaha, where they finished tied for seventh place after losing two games to eventual champion Texas and fourth place Oklahoma.

== Personnel ==
=== Roster ===
1975 Cal State Fullerton Titans roster
Pitchers: 5 - Tony Bonura - Sophomore; 12 - Dan Boone - Junior; 19 - Frank Allen - Senior; 21 - Greg Foster - Freshman; 22 - Greg Johnson - Sophomore; 24 - Tim Matz - Senior; 26 - Dan Everts - Senior; 27 - Curt Lewis - Sophomore; 28 - Butch Black - Junior	Catchers: 6 - Andy Pasillas - Junior; 17 - Lee Williams - Senior; 29 - Jim McDonald - Sophomore; Outfielders: 3 - Frank Estes - Senior; 4 - Jody Robinson - Junior; 7 - Stu Smith - Senior; 9 - Jeff Nichols - Freshman; 10 - Dave Chavez - Junior; 11 - Mike Keegan - Junior; 19 - Rob Jantz - Junior	Infielders: 2 - Jim Irvine - Junior; 8 - George Horton - Junior; 14 - Dan Peters - Senior; 15 - Dave Robb - Senior; 23 - Mike Casarez - Junior; 25 - Steve Herz - Freshman

=== Coaches ===
1975 Cal State Fullerton Titans baseball coaching staff
- 16 - Augie Garrido - Head coach - 3rd year
- 18 - Dave Snow - Assistant coach - 3rd year
- 1 - Don Sneddon - Graduate Assistant - 1st year
- 30 - Mike Wilson - Graduate Assistant - 1st year

== Schedule and results ==
Legend
Cal State Fullerton win
Cal State Fullerton loss
Tie

1975 Cal State Fullerton Titans baseball game log
Regular season

February
Date	Opponent	Site/stadium	Score	Overall record	PCAA Record
Feb 7	Southern California College*	Titan Field • Fullerton, CA	W 5–1	1–0	
Feb 8	Whittier*	Titan Field • Fullerton, CA	W 10–1	2–0	
Feb 8	Whittier*	Titan Field • Fullerton, CA	W 2–1	3–0	
Feb 11	at Cal State Northridge*	Matador Field • Northridge, CA	W 11–6	4–0	
Feb 14	at UCLA*	Sawtelle Field • Los Angeles, CA	W 7–2	5–0	
Feb 15	Chapman*	Titan Field • Fullerton, CA	L 2–3	5–1	
Feb 18	at Point Loma*	San Diego, CA	W 6–2	6–1	
Feb 21	at Southern California*	Dedeaux Field • Los Angeles, CA	L 0–1	6–2	
Feb 22	at Southern California College*	Costa Mesa, CA	W 3–2	7–2	
Feb 22	at Southern California College*	Costa Mesa, CA	W 12–4	8–2	
Feb 24	at Arizona State*	Packard Stadium • Tempe, AZ	W 7–6	9–2	
Feb 25	at Arizona State*	Packard Stadium • Tempe, AZ	L 2–7	9–3	
Feb 26	at Arizona State*	Packard Stadium • Tempe, AZ	L 3–4	9–4	
Feb 28	UC San Diego*	Titan Field • Fullerton, CA	W 16–2	10–4	

March
Date	Opponent	Site/stadium	Score	Overall record	PCAA Record
Mar 3	at Cal State Los Angeles*	Los Angeles, CA	W 11–4	11–4	
Mar 4	Cal State Dominguez Hills*	Titan Field • Fullerton, CA	L 2–6	11–5	
Mar 11	at Loyola Marymount*	Los Angeles, CA	W 3–1	12–5	
Mar 15	Cal State Northridge*	Titan Field • Fullerton, CA	W 2–1	13–5	
Mar 15	Cal State Northridge*	Titan Field • Fullerton, CA	W 3–2	14–5	
Mar 18	Point Loma*	Titan Field • Fullerton, CA	W 6–3	15–5	
Mar 19	Arizona State*	Titan Field • Fullerton, CA	W 10–8	16–5	
Mar 28	at Pacific	Billy Hebert Field • Stockton, CA	W 3–1	17–5	1–0
Mar 29	at Pacific	Billy Hebert Field • Stockton, CA	W 7–4	18–5	2–0
Mar 29	at Pacific	Billy Hebert Field • Stockton, CA	W 5–3	19–5	3–0

April
Date	Opponent	Site/stadium	Score	Overall record	PCAA Record
Apr 1	at Cal State Dominguez Hills*	Carson, CA	L 1–2	19–6	
Apr 4	Long Beach State	Titan Field • Fullerton, CA	W 1–0	20–6	4–0
Apr 5	Long Beach State	Titan Field • Fullerton, CA	L 3–5	20–7	4–1
Apr 5	Long Beach State	Titan Field • Fullerton, CA	W 5–0	21–7	5–1
Apr 8	Loyola Marymount*	Titan Field • Fullerton, CA	W 2–0	22–7	
Apr 12	at San Diego State	Smith Stadium • San Diego, CA	W 7–3	23–7	6–1
Apr 12	at San Diego State	Smith Stadium • San Diego, CA	L 4–5	23–8	6–2
Apr 18	San Diego State	Titan Field • Fullerton, CA	W 7–2	24–8	7–2
Apr 19	San Diego State	Titan Field • Fullerton, CA	W 7–2	25–8	8–2
Apr 19	San Diego State	Titan Field • Fullerton, CA	L 2–4	25–9	8–3
Apr 22	at Pepperdine*	Eddy D. Field Stadium • Malibu, CA	W 4–1	26–9	
Apr 25	Fresno State	Titan Field • Fullerton, CA	W 6–5	27–9	9–3
Apr 26	Fresno State	Titan Field • Fullerton, CA	W 11–6	28–9	10–3
Apr 26	Fresno State	Titan Field • Fullerton, CA	L 4–6	28–10	10–4
Apr 29	Cal State Los Angeles*	Titan Field • Fullerton, CA	W 7–1	29–10	

May
Date	Opponent	Site/stadium	Score	Overall record	PCAA Record
May 2	at Long Beach State	Blair Field • Long Beach, CA	W 5–3	30–10	11–4
May 3	at Long Beach State	Blair Field • Long Beach, CA	W 6–5	31–10	12–4
May 3	at Long Beach State	Blair Field • Long Beach, CA	L 2–4	31–11	12–5
May 9	at San Jose State	San Jose Municipal Stadium • San Jose, CA	L 0–6	31–12	12–6
May 10	at San Jose State	San Jose Municipal Stadium • San Jose, CA	W 10–2	32–12	13–6
May 10	at San Jose State	San Jose Municipal Stadium • San Jose, CA	W 4–3	33–12	14–6
May 11	vs Southern California	Anaheim Stadium • Anaheim, CA	T 4–4	33–12–1	
May 16	at San Diego State	Smith Stadium • San Diego, CA	L 3–4	33–13–1	14–7

Postseason

NCAA West Regional
Date	Opponent	Site/stadium	Score	Overall record	Reg Record
May 23	Southern California	Dedeaux Field • Los Angeles, CA	W 3–1	34–13–1	1–0
May 24	Pepperdine	Dedeaux Field • Los Angeles, CA	W 2–1	35–13–1	2–0
May 25	Pepperdine	Dedeaux Field • Los Angeles, CA	L 4–5	35–14–1	2–1
May 25	Pepperdine	Dedeaux Field • Los Angeles, CA	W 6–4	36–14–1	3–1

College World Series
Date	Opponent	Site/stadium	Score	Overall record	CWS record
June 6	Arizona State	Johnny Rosenblatt Stadium • Omaha, NE	L 3–5	36–15–1	0–1
June 7	Oklahoma	Johnny Rosenblatt Stadium • Omaha, NE	L 4–11	36–16–1	0–2
