= 1975 ACC tournament =

1975 ACC tournament may refer to:

- 1975 ACC men's basketball tournament
- 1975 Atlantic Coast Conference baseball tournament
