= 1975 Atlantic Coast Conference baseball tournament =

American college baseball tournament

- Teams: 7
- Format: Seven-team double-elimination tournament
- Finals site: Boshamer Stadium; Chapel Hill, North Carolina
- Champions: NC State (3rd title)
- Winning coach: Sam Esposito (3rd title)
- Attendance: 9,250

1975 Atlantic Coast Conference baseball standings
	Conf.				Overall
Team	W		L	PCT	W		L	PCT
No. 25 Clemson ‍†‍‍^{y}	10	–	2	.833	33	–	10	.767
No. 15 NC State ‍†‍‡‍^{y}	10	–	2	.833	27	–	7	.794
Maryland ‍‍‍	7	–	3	.700	15	–	8	.652
North Carolina ‍‍‍	4	–	7	.364	17	–	9	.654
Virginia ‍‍‍	4	–	7	.364	14	–	12	.538
Wake Forest ‍‍‍	3	–	9	.250	9	–	20	.310
Duke ‍‍‍	2	–	10	.167	9	–	18	.333
† – Conference champion ‡ – Tournament champion y – Invited to the NCAA tournament As of June 30, 1975; Rankings from Collegiate Baseball

The 1975 Atlantic Coast Conference baseball tournament was held in Chapel Hill, North Carolina, from April 24 through 27. NC State won the tournament and earned the Atlantic Coast Conference's automatic bid to the 1975 NCAA Division I baseball tournament.

== Tournament ==
Play-In Rd. (Single Elim.)	Upper round 2	Upper final	Championship
4	North Carolina	7
1	Clemson	2
5	Virginia	2
4	North Carolina	5
4	North Carolina	2
2	NC State	7
6	Wake Forest	1
3	Maryland	0
2	NC State	13
6	Wake Forest	1
7	Duke	0
2	NC State	12
2	NC State	3	—
1	Clemson	2	—
Lower round 1	Lower final
4	North Carolina	6
1	Clemson	15	1	Clemson	7
6	Wake Forest	1

== See also ==
- College World Series
- NCAA Division I Baseball Championship
