= 1975 NCAA Division I baseball tournament =

- Season: 1975
- Teams: 32
- Finals site: Johnny Rosenblatt Stadium; Omaha, NE
- Champions: Texas (3rd title)
- Runner-up: South Carolina (1st CWS Appearance)
- Winning coach: Cliff Gustafson (1st title)
- MOP: Mickey Reichenbach (Texas)

The 1975 NCAA Division I baseball tournament was played at the end of the 1975 NCAA Division I baseball season to determine the national champion of college baseball. The tournament concluded with eight teams competing in the College World Series, a double-elimination tournament in its twenty-ninth year. Eight regional competitions were held to determine the participants in the final event. Each region held a four team, double-elimination tournament, resulting in 32 teams participating in the tournament at the conclusion of their regular season, and in some cases, after a conference tournament. The twenty-ninth tournament's champion was Texas, coached by Cliff Gustafson, their first in a quarter-century. The Most Outstanding Player was Mickey Reichenbach of Texas. This was the first year the tournament used the regionals.

The 1975 tournament marked the first appearance for LSU, which would become a college baseball superpower in the succeeding decades, claiming seven national championships between 1991 and 2023. LSU had earlier won the 1961 Southeastern Conference championship to earn an automatic bid to the NCAA tournament, but declined the bid to avoid playing integrated teams.

This season also marked the first appearance for Cal State Fullerton, which would claim four national championships from 1979 through 2004. Head coach Augie Garrido guided the Titans to three titles before moving to Texas, where he claimed three more titles from 2002 through 2009.

== Regionals ==
1975 was the first year the NCAA featured the Regional format for the tournament, which is still in use today, although it has been modified.

=== Northeast Regional ===
Games played in Stamford, CT.

First Round
Seton Hall | 7
Penn | 5
St. John's | 17
Maine | 3
Lower round 1
Maine | 1
Penn | 0

Semi-Finals
Seton Hall | 5
St. John's | 1
Lower final
Maine | 6*
St. John's | 5*

Finals
Seton Hall | 11 | —
Maine | 5 | —

=== Atlantic Regional ===
Games played in Columbia, SC.

First Round
Temple | 4
NC State | 3
South Carolina | 11
The Citadel | 3
Lower round 1
NC State | 16
The Citadel | 3

Semi-Finals
South Carolina | 15
Temple | 0
Lower final
Temple | 2
NC State | 4

Finals
South Carolina | 4 | —
NC State | 3 | —

=== Mideast Regional ===
Games played in Ypsilanti, MI.

Upper Semifinals
Michigan | 5
Penn State | 1
Eastern Michigan | 5
Clemson | 3
Lower round 1
Penn State | 5
Clemson | 4

Upper bracket finals
Eastern Michigan | 3
Michigan | 2
Lower final
Michigan | 10
Penn State | 7

Grand Finals
Michigan | 4 | 1
Eastern Michigan | 2 | 2

=== South Regional ===
Games played in Starkville, MS.

First Round
Florida State | 1
Miami (FL) | 0
LSU | 7
Murray State | 2
Lower round 1
Miami (FL) | 8
Murray State | 7

Semi-Finals
Florida State | 4
LSU | 2
Lower final
Miami (FL) | 8
LSU | 1

Finals
Florida State | 6 | —
Miami (FL) | 5 | —

=== Midwest Regional ===
Games played in Norman, OK.

First Round
Tulsa | 3*
Iowa | 2*
Oklahoma | 5
Texas A&M | 4
Lower round 1
Texas A&M | 9
Iowa | 6

Semi-Finals
Tulsa | 4*
Oklahoma | 3*
Lower final
Oklahoma | 6
Texas A&M | 4

Finals
Oklahoma | 2 | 8
Tulsa | 1 | 5

=== South Central Regional ===
Games played in Arlington, TX.

First Round
South Alabama | 8
Texas–Pan American | 7
Texas | 6
Louisiana Tech | 2
Lower round 1
Texas–Pan American | 8^{7}
Louisiana Tech | 1

Semi-Finals
Texas | 7
South Alabama | 4
Lower final
South Alabama | 8
Texas–Pan American | 9

Finals
Texas | 9 | —
Texas–Pan American | 2 | —

=== Rocky Mountain Regional ===
Games played in Tempe, AZ.

First Round
Arizona State | 18
Washington State | 2
Puget Sound | 11
Northern Colorado | 3
Lower round 1
Washington State | 7
Northern Colorado | 2

Semi-Finals
Arizona State | 20
Puget Sound | 3
Lower final
Puget Sound | 3
Washington State | 4

Finals
Arizona State | 7 | 5
Washington State | 8 | 1

=== West Regional ===
Games played in Los Angeles.

First Round
Pepperdine | 4
Arizona | 3
Cal State Fullerton | 3
Southern California | 1
Lower round 1
Arizona | 0
Southern California | 1

Semi-Finals
Cal State Fullerton | 2
Pepperdine | 1
Lower final
Southern California | 2
Pepperdine | 5

Finals
Cal State Fullerton | 4 | 6
Pepperdine | 5 | 4

== College World Series ==
Seton Hall, South Carolina, Eastern Michigan, Florida St., Oklahoma, Texas, Arizona St. and Cal St. Fullerton won their regionals and moved on to the 1975 College World Series.

=== Participants ===
| School | Conference | Record (conference) | Head coach | CWS appearances | CWS best finish | CWS record |
|---|---|---|---|---|---|---|
| Arizona State | WAC | 58–11 (16–2) | Jim Brock | 6 (last: 1973) | 1st (1965, 1967, 1969) | 23–9 |
| Cal State Fullerton | PCAA | 36–14–1 (n/a) | Augie Garrido | 0 (last: none) | none | 0–0 |
| Eastern Michigan | MAC | 35–17 (12–4) | Ron Oestrike | 0 (last: none) | none | 0–0 |
| Florida State | n/a | 49–8 (n/a) | Woody Woodward | 5 (last: 1970) | 2nd (1970) | 8–10 |
| Oklahoma | Big 8 | 50–8 (15–3) | Enos Semore | 4 (last: 1974) | 1st (1951) | 7–6 |
| Seton Hall | Metro | 31–8 (12–4) | Mike Sheppard | 3 (last: 1974) | 5th (1964) | 1–6 |
| South Carolina | n/a | 47–4 (n/a) | Bobby Richardson | 0 (last: none) | none | 0–0 |
| Texas | SWC | 52–5 (23–1) | Cliff Gustafson | 16 (last: 1974) | 1st (1949, 1950) | 32–29 |

=== Results ===
==== Bracket ====
Upper round 1
Arizona State | 5
Cal State Fullerton | 3
Texas | 4
Oklahoma | 2
South Carolina | 3
Seton Hall | 1
Eastern Michigan | 2^{10}
Florida State | 1

Upper round 2
Arizona State | 5
Texas | 2
South Carolina | 5^{6}
Eastern Michigan | 1
Lower round 1
Cal State Fullerton | 4
Oklahoma | 11
Seton Hall | 11
Florida State | 0

Upper final
Arizona State | 3
South Carolina | 6
Lower round 2
Eastern Michigan | 0
Oklahoma | 7
Texas | 12
Seton Hall | 10

Semifinals
South Carolina | 6
Texas | 17
Arizona State | 1^{11}
Oklahoma | 0

Preliminary final
South Carolina | 4
Arizona State | 1

Final
Texas | 5
South Carolina | 1

==== Game results ====
| Date | Game | Winner | Score | Loser | Notes |
|---|---|---|---|---|---|
| June 6 | Game 1 | Arizona State | 5–3 | Cal State Fullerton | |
| June 6 | Game 2 | Texas | 4–2 | Oklahoma | |
| June 7 | Game 3 | South Carolina | 3–1 | Seton Hall | |
| June 7 | Game 4 | Eastern Michigan | 2–1 (10 innings) | Florida State | |
| June 7 | Game 5 | Oklahoma | 11–4 | Cal State Fullerton | Cal State Fullerton eliminated |
| June 8 | Game 6 | Seton Hall | 11–0 | Florida State | Florida State eliminated |
| June 8 | Game 7 | Arizona State | 5–2 | Texas | |
| June 8 | Game 8 | South Carolina | 5–1 (6 innings) | Eastern Michigan | |
| June 9 | Game 9 | Texas | 12–10 | Seton Hall | Seton Hall eliminated |
| June 9 | Game 10 | Oklahoma | 7–0 | Eastern Michigan | Eastern Michigan eliminated |
| June 11 | Game 11 | South Carolina | 6–3 | Arizona State | |
| June 12 | Game 12 | Arizona State | 1–0 (11 innings) | Oklahoma | Oklahoma eliminated |
| June 12 | Game 13 | Texas | 17–6 | South Carolina | |
| June 13 | Game 14 | South Carolina | 4–1 | Arizona State | Arizona State eliminated |
| June 14 | Final | Texas | 5–1 | South Carolina | Texas wins CWS |

=== All-Tournament Team ===
The following players were members of the All-Tournament Team.

| Position | Player | School |
|---|---|---|
| P | Earl Bass | South Carolina |
| P | Richard Wortham | Texas |
| C | Rick Cerone | Seton Hall |
| 1B | Mickey Reichenbach (MOP) | Texas |
| 2B | Mark Van Bever | South Carolina |
| 3B | Gary Allenson | Arizona State |
| SS | Blair Stouffer | Texas |
| OF | Rick Bradley | Texas |
| OF | Steve Cook | South Carolina |
| OF | Bob Pate | Arizona State |

=== Notable players ===
- Arizona State: Gary Allenson, Chris Bando, Floyd Bannister, Mike Colbern, Dave Hudgens, Darrell Jackson, Ken Landreaux, Jerry Maddox, Chris Nyman, Rick Peters, Ken Phelps, John Poloni, Gary Rajsich
- Cal State Fullerton: Danny Boone, George Horton
- Eastern Michigan: Glenn Gulliver, John Martin, Bob Owchinko, Bob Welch
- Florida State: Juan Bonilla, Craig Eaton, Mark Gilbert, Terry Kennedy, Carlos Lezcano, Dan O'Brien
- Oklahoma: Terry Bogener, Keith Drumright, George Frazier, Roger LaFrancois, Bob Shirley
- Seton Hall: Rick Cerone, Dan Morogiello, Charlie Puleo
- South Carolina: Garry Hancock, Greg Keatley, Ed Lynch, Jim Pankovits, Hank Small
- Texas: Jim Gideon, Don Kainer, Keith Moreland, Rich Wortham

== Tournament Notes ==
The Arizona State team featured 13 future Major League players – a record matched by the school's team from the following year.

Texas came back to win the CWS after losing in Game 7 to Arizona State.

== See also ==
- 1975 NCAA Division II baseball tournament
- 1975 NAIA World Series
