= 1975 NCAA Division I baseball season =

Baseball season

- Number of teams: 220

NCAA tournament

College World Series
- Champions: Texas (3rd title)
- Runners-up: South Carolina (1st CWS Appearance)
- Winning coach: Cliff Gustafson (1st title)
- MOP: Mickey Reichenbach (Texas)

Seasons
- ← 1974 1976 →

The 1975 NCAA Division I baseball season, play of college baseball in the United States organized by the National Collegiate Athletic Association (NCAA) began in the spring of 1975. The season progressed through the regular season and concluded with the 1975 College World Series. The College World Series, held for the 29th time in 1975, consisted of one team from each of eight regional competitions and was held in Omaha, Nebraska at Johnny Rosenblatt Stadium as a double-elimination tournament. Texas claimed the championship for the third time.

== Conference winners ==
This is a partial list of conference champions from the 1975 season. For the first time, the NCAA sponsored regional competitions to determine the College World Series participants. Eight regionals of four teams each competed in double-elimination tournaments, with the winners advancing to Omaha. 15 teams earned automatic bids by winning their conference championship while 17 teams earned at-large selections.

Conference	Regular season winner	Conference tournament	Tournament venue • city	Tournament winner
Atlantic Coast Conference	Clemson/NC State	1975 Atlantic Coast Conference baseball tournament	Boshamer Stadium • Chapel Hill, NC	NC State
Big Eight Conference	Oklahoma	No tournament		
Big Ten Conference	Michigan	No tournament		
EIBL	Penn	No tournament		
Metropolitan Intercollegiate Conference	Seton Hall			
Mid-American Conference	Eastern Michigan	No tournament		
Pacific-8 Conference	North - Oregon State; South - Southern California	No tournament		
Pacific Coast Athletic Association	Cal State Fullerton	No tournament		
Southeastern Conference	LSU	No tournament		
Southern Conference	The Citadel	No tournament		
Southwest Conference	Texas	No tournament		
Western Athletic Conference	North - BYU; South - Arizona State	1975 Western Athletic Conference Baseball Championship Series	Packard Stadium • Tempe, AZ	Arizona State
Yankee Conference	Maine	No tournament		

== Conference standings ==
The following is an incomplete list of conference standings:

1975 Atlantic Coast Conference baseball standings
	Conf.				Overall
Team	W		L	PCT	W		L	PCT
No. 25 Clemson ‍†‍‍^{y}	10	–	2	.833	33	–	10	.767
No. 15 NC State ‍†‍‡‍^{y}	10	–	2	.833	27	–	7	.794
Maryland ‍‍‍	7	–	3	.700	15	–	8	.652
North Carolina ‍‍‍	4	–	7	.364	17	–	9	.654
Virginia ‍‍‍	4	–	7	.364	14	–	12	.538
Wake Forest ‍‍‍	3	–	9	.250	9	–	20	.310
Duke ‍‍‍	2	–	10	.167	9	–	18	.333
† – Conference champion ‡ – Tournament champion y – Invited to the NCAA tournament As of June 30, 1975; Rankings from Collegiate Baseball

1975 Big Eight Conference baseball standings
	Conf.				Overall
Team	W		L	PCT	W		L	PCT
No. 4 Oklahoma ‍†‍‍^{y}	15	–	3	.833	52	–	10	.839
Iowa State ‍‍‍	11	–	9	.550	23	–	19	.548
Kansas State ‍‍‍	9	–	9	.500	24	–	22	.522
Oklahoma State ‍‍‍	10	–	10	.500	22	–	18	.550
Nebraska ‍‍‍	7	–	8	.467	12	–	20	.375
Missouri ‍‍‍	8	–	10	.444	17	–	20	.459
Colorado ‍‍‍	6	–	9	.400	22	–	14	.611
Kansas ‍‍‍	5	–	13	.278	15	–	25	.375
† – Conference champion y – Invited to the NCAA tournament As of June 30, 1975; Rankings from Collegiate Baseball

1975 Metropolitan Intercollegiate Conference baseball standings
	Conf.						Overall
Team	W		L		T	PCT	W		L		T	PCT
No. 6 Seton Hall ‍†‍‍^{y}	12	–	4	–	0	.750	33	–	10	–	0	.767
Fordham ‍†‍‍	12	–	4	–	0	.750	21	–	11	–	0	.656
Fairleigh Dickinson ‍‍‍	11	–	4	–	0	.733	23	–	13	–	1	.635
C. W. Post ‍‍‍	0	–	0	–	0	–	20	–	10	–	0	.667
Iona ‍‍‍	6	–	9	–	0	.400	10	–	21	–	0	.323
LIU ‍‍‍	6	–	10	–	0	.375	6	–	18	–	0	.250
Manhattan ‍‍‍	4	–	12	–	0	.250	6	–	13	–	0	.316
CCNY ‍‍‍	1	–	9	–	0	.100	1	–	16	–	0	.059
Wagner ‍‍‍	0	–	0	–	0	–	7	–	13	–	0	.350
St. Francis (NY) ‍‍‍	0	–	0	–	0	–	7	–	16	–	0	.304
† – Conference champion y – Invited to the NCAA tournament As of June 17, 1975; Rankings from Collegiate Baseball

1975 Pacific Coast Athletic Association baseball standings
	Conf.						Overall
Team	W		L		T	PCT	W		L		T	PCT
No. 8 Cal State Fullerton ‍†‍‍^{y}	14	–	7	–	0	.667	36	–	16	–	1	.689
Pacific ‍‍‍	13	–	8	–	0	.619	33	–	26	–	0	.559
San Jose State ‍‍‍	9	–	9	–	0	.500	22	–	22	–	0	.500
San Diego State ‍‍‍	8	–	10	–	0	.444	22	–	25	–	0	.468
Long Beach State ‍‍‍	9	–	12	–	0	.429	30	–	20	–	0	.600
Fresno State ‍‍‍	7	–	14	–	0	.333	26	–	33	–	0	.441
† – Conference champion y – Invited to the NCAA tournament As of June 30, 1975; Rankings from Collegiate Baseball

1975 Southern Conference baseball standings
	Conf.				Overall
Team	W		L	PCT	W		L	PCT
No. 28 The Citadel ‍†‍‍^{y}	11	–	3	.786	21	–	9	.700
Davidson ‍‍‍	10	–	4	.714	21	–	15	.583
East Carolina ‍‍‍	9	–	5	.643	16	–	12	.571
Furman ‍‍‍	8	–	6	.571	10	–	12	.455
Richmond ‍‍‍	8	–	6	.571	17	–	16	.515
Appalachian State ‍‍‍	6	–	8	.429	19	–	16	.543
William & Mary ‍‍‍	3	–	11	.214	10	–	18	.357
VMI ‍‍‍	1	–	13	.071	2	–	18	.100
y – Invited to the NCAA tournament As of June 30, 1975; Rankings from Collegiate Baseball

1975 Southwest Conference baseball standings
	Conf.				Overall
Team	W		L	PCT	W		L	PCT
No. 1 Texas ‍†‍‍^{y}	23	–	1	.958	59	–	6	.908
Texas A&M ‍‍‍^{y}	17	–	7	.708	32	–	15	.681
TCU ‍‍‍	12	–	12	.500	29	–	17	.630
Baylor ‍‍‍	11	–	13	.458	25	–	19	.568
Rice ‍‍‍	11	–	13	.458	19	–	16	.543
Texas Tech ‍‍‍	9	–	15	.375	22	–	23	.489
Arkansas ‍‍‍	8	–	14	.364	20	–	22	.476
Houston ‍‍‍	8	–	16	.333	18	–	25	.419
SMU ‍‍‍	7	–	15	.318	12	–	22	.353
† – Conference champion y – Invited to the NCAA tournament As of June 30, 1975; Rankings from Collegiate Baseball

1975 Western Athletic Conference baseball standings
	Conf.				Overall
Team	W		L	PCT	W		L	PCT
Northern
No. 29 BYU ^{x}‍‍‍	15	–	1	.938	22	–	19	.537
Colorado State ‍‍‍	8	–	10	.444	19	–	19	.500
Wyoming ‍‍‍	6	–	12	.333	26	–	24	.520
Utah ‍‍‍	5	–	11	.313	11	–	17	.393
Southern
No. 3 Arizona State ^{x}‍‍‡‍^{y}	16	–	2	.889	61	–	13	.824
No. 13 Arizona ‍‍‍^{y}	14	–	4	.778	43	–	13	.768
New Mexico ‍‍‍	3	–	15	.167	26	–	24	.520
UTEP ‍‍‍	3	–	15	.167	18	–	26	.409
x – Division champion ‡ – Playoff champion y – Invited to the NCAA tournament As of June 30, 1975; Rankings from Collegiate Baseball

== College World Series ==
The 1975 season marked the twenty ninth NCAA baseball tournament, which culminated with the eight team College World Series. The College World Series was held in Omaha, Nebraska. The eight teams played a double-elimination format, with Texas claiming their third championship with a 5–1 win over South Carolina in the final.

Upper round 1
Arizona State	5
Cal State Fullerton	3
Texas	4
Oklahoma	2
South Carolina	3
Seton Hall	1
Eastern Michigan	2^{10}
Florida State	1

Upper round 2
Arizona State	5
Texas	2
South Carolina	5^{6}
Eastern Michigan	1
Lower round 1
Cal State Fullerton	4
Oklahoma	11
Seton Hall	11
Florida State	0

Upper final
Arizona State	3
South Carolina	6
Lower round 2
Eastern Michigan	0
Oklahoma	7
Texas	12
Seton Hall	10

Semifinals
South Carolina	6
Texas	17
Arizona State	1^{11}
Oklahoma	0

Preliminary final
South Carolina	4
Arizona State	1

Final
Texas	5
South Carolina	1
