= 1975 Oklahoma Sooners baseball team =

American college baseball season

1975 Oklahoma Sooners baseball

NCAA Midwest Regional Regional champions Big Eight Conference champions

College World Series, 2–2
- Conference: Big Eight Conference
- Record: 52–10 (15–3 Big Eight)
- Head coach: Enos Semore (8th year)
- Home stadium: Haskell Park

1975 Big Eight Conference baseball standings
	Conf.				Overall
Team	W		L	PCT	W		L	PCT
No. 4 Oklahoma ‍†‍‍^{y}	15	–	3	.833	52	–	10	.839
Iowa State ‍‍‍	11	–	9	.550	23	–	19	.548
Kansas State ‍‍‍	9	–	9	.500	24	–	22	.522
Oklahoma State ‍‍‍	10	–	10	.500	22	–	18	.550
Nebraska ‍‍‍	7	–	8	.467	12	–	20	.375
Missouri ‍‍‍	8	–	10	.444	17	–	20	.459
Colorado ‍‍‍	6	–	9	.400	22	–	14	.611
Kansas ‍‍‍	5	–	13	.278	15	–	25	.375
† – Conference champion y – Invited to the NCAA tournament As of June 30, 1975; Rankings from Collegiate Baseball

The 1975 Oklahoma Sooners baseball team represented the University of Oklahoma in the 1975 NCAA Division I baseball season. The Sooners played their home games at Haskell Park, and played as part of the Big Eight Conference. The team was coached by Enos Semore in his eighth season as head coach at Oklahoma.

The Sooners reached the College World Series, their fifth appearance in Omaha, where they finished in fourth place after recording wins against Cal State Fullerton and Eastern Michigan and losing games to eventual champion Texas and semifinalist Arizona State.

== Personnel ==
=== Roster ===
1975 Oklahoma Sooners roster
Pitchers: 15 - David Bryan Wendt; 16 - Kenneth Palmer; 18 - Marty Kunkler; 19 - F. Breen Newcomer; 21 - Bob Shirley; 25 - George Frazier; 26 - Mickey Lewis Lashley	Catchers: 12 - Jacky Ray Parish; 22 - Roger LaFrancois; Outfielders: 7 - Bill E. Severns; 8 - Wayne G. Pecheck; 9 - Terry Bogener; 11 - Stanley Herbert Lawrence; Infielders: 2 - Keith Drumright; 3 - Kelly Ray Snider; 5 - Gregory L. Stitzinger; 6 - Michael J. Cunico; 23 - Mike Umfleet	4 - Rick A. Jenson; 17 - Terry Jolly; 20 - Doug E. Schaefer; 1 - Jackie Lee Schuman

=== Coaches ===
1975 Oklahoma Sooners baseball coaching staff
- - Enos Semore - Head coach - 8th Season
- - Gene Stephenson - Assistant coach - 3rd season

== Schedule and results ==
Legend
Oklahoma win
Oklahoma loss

1975 Oklahoma Sooners baseball game log
Regular season

February
Date	Opponent	Site/Stadium	Score	Overall Record	Big 8 Record
Feb 22	vs Lamar*	Dutton Street Park • Waco, TX	W 11–1	1–0	
Feb 22	at Baylor*	Dutton Street Park • Waco, TX	L 0–5	1–1	
Feb 22	at Baylor*	Dutton Street Park • Waco, TX	W 11–3	2–1	

March
Date	Opponent	Site/Stadium	Score	Overall Record	Big 8 Record
Mar 8	at UNLV*	Rebel Field • Paradise, NV	W 7–2	3–1	
Mar 8	at UNLV*	Rebel Field • Paradise, NV	W 7–4	4–1	
Mar 8	at UNLV*	Rebel Field • Paradise, NV	L 4–9	4–2	
Mar 10	vs BYU*	UH Stadium • Honlulu, HI	W 11–2	5–2	
Mar 10	vs BYU*	UH Stadium • Honolulu, HI	W 7–4	6–2	
Mar 10	at Hawaii*	UH Stadium • Honolulu, HI	W 11–4	7–2	
Mar 10	at Hawaii*	UH Stadium • Honolulu, HI	W 23–6	8–2	
Mar 12	at Hawaii*	UH Stadium • Honolulu, HI	W 4–2	9–2	
Mar 12	at Hawaii*	UH Stadium • Honolulu, HI	W 10–4	10–2	
Mar 14	vs Nagoya (Japan)*	UH Stadium • Honolulu, HI	W 7–0	11–2	
Mar 14	vs Nagoya (Japan)*	UH Stadium • Honolulu, HI	W 5–1	12–2	
Mar 14	at Hawaii*	UH Stadium • Honolulu, HI	W 4–0	13–2	
Mar 14	at Hawaii*	UH Stadium • Honolulu, HI	W 4–3	14–2	
Mar 19	Oklahoma City*	Haskell Park • Norman, OK	W 7–1	15–2	
Mar 19	Oklahoma City*	Haskell Park • Norman, OK	W 5–1	16–2	
Mar 21	Indiana*	Haskell Park • Norman, OK	W 2–1	17–2	
Mar 22	Central State (OK)*	Haskell Park • Norman, OK	W 9–0	18–2	
Mar 22	Indiana*	Haskell Park • Norman, OK	W 10–0	19–2	
Mar 24	Central Michigan*	Haskell Park • Norman, OK	W 5–3	20–2	
Mar 24	Central Michigan*	Haskell Park • Norman, OK	W 15–4	21–2	

April
Date	Opponent	Site/Stadium	Score	Overall Record	Big 8 Record
Apr 1	Oklahoma Baptist*	Haskell Park • Norman, OK	W 8–0	22–2	
Apr 1	Oklahoma Baptist*	Haskell Park • Norman, OK	W 9–1	23–2	
Apr 5	at Colorado	Varsity Field • Boulder, CO	W 7–4	24–2	1–0
Apr 5	at Colorado	Varsity Field • Boulder, CO	W 8–2	25–2	2–0
Apr 6	at Colorado	Varsity Field • Boulder, CO	W 10–6	26–2	3–0
Apr 8	Cameron*	Haskell Park • Norman, OK	W 6–0	27–2	
Apr 8	Cameron*	Haskell Park • Norman, OK	W 9–8	28–2	
Apr 11	at Iowa State	Cap Timm Field • Ames, IA	L 4–6	28–3	3–1
Apr 12	at Iowa State	Cap Timm Field • Ames, IA	L 0–1	28–4	3–2
Apr 12	at Iowa State	Cap Timm Field • Ames, IA	W 5–3	29–4	4–2
Apr 14	Baylor*	Haskell Park • Norman, OK	W 3–1	30–4	
Apr 14	Baylor*	Haskell Park • Norman, OK	L 3–5	30–5	
Apr 18	vs Oklahoma State	All Sports Stadium • Oklahoma City, OK	W 3–1	31–5	5–2
Apr 19	Oklahoma State	Haskell Park • Norman, OK	W 4–0	32–5	6–2
Apr 19	Oklahoma State	Haskell Park • Norman, OK	L 3–4	32–6	6–3
Apr 21	Arizona State*	Haskell Park • Norman, OK	W 11–2	33–6	
Apr 21	Arizona State*	Haskell Park • Norman, OK	L 3–4	33–7	
Apr 25	Missouri	Haskell Park • Norman, OK	W 7–1	34–7	7–3
Apr 25	Missouri	Haskell Park • Norman, OK	W 13–1	35–7	8–3
Apr 26	Missouri	Haskell Park • Norman, OK	W 5–3	36–7	9–3
Apr 28	Houston*	Haskell Park • Norman, OK	W 8–1	37–7	
Apr 28	Houston*	Haskell Park • Norman, OK	W 5–4	38–7	

May
Date	Opponent	Site/Stadium	Score	Overall Record	Big 8 Record
May 2	at Kansas	Quigley Field • Lawrence, KS	W 7–1	39–7	10–3
May 2	at Kansas	Quigley Field • Lawrence, KS	W 13–0	40–7	11–3
May 4	at Kansas	Quigley Field • Lawrence, KS	W 9–3	41–7	12–3
May 13	Nebraska	Haskell Park • Norman, OK	W 4–2	42–7	13–3
May 13	Nebraska	Haskell Park • Norman, OK	W 1–0	43–7	14–3
May 14	Nebraska	Haskell Park • Norman, OK	W 4–1	44–7	15–3
May 17	Lubbock Christian*	Haskell Park • Norman, OK	W 17–4	45–7	
May 17	Lubbock Christian*	Haskell Park • Norman, OK	W 8–6	46–7	

Postseason

NCAA Midwest Regional
Date	Opponent	Rank/Seed	Site/Stadium	Score	Overall Record	Reg Record
May 24	Texas A&M	Haskell Park • Norman, OK	W 5–4	47–7	1–0	
May 25	Tulsa	Haskell Park • Norman, OK	L 3–4	47–8	1–1	
May 25	Texas A&M	Haskell Park • Norman, OK	W 6–4	48–8	2–1	
May 26	Tulsa	Haskell Park • Norman, OK	W 2–1	49–8	3–1	
May 26	Tulsa	Haskell Park • Norman, OK	W 8–5	50–8	4–1	

College World Series
Date	Opponent	Site/Stadium	Score	Overall Record	CWS Record
June 6	Texas	Johnny Rosenblatt Stadium • Omaha, NE	L 2–4	50–9	0–1
June 7	Cal State Fullerton	Johnny Rosenblatt Stadium • Omaha, NE	W 11–4	51–9	1–1
June 9	Eastern Michigan	Johnny Rosenblatt Stadium • Omaha, NE	W 7–0	52–9	2–1
June 12	Arizona State	Johnny Rosenblatt Stadium • Omaha, NE	L 0–1^{11}	52–10	2–2
