= 1975 Arizona State Sun Devils baseball team =

American college baseball season

1975 Arizona State Sun Devils baseball

WAC champions NCAA Rocky Mountain Regional champions

College World Series, 3–2
- Conference: Western Athletic Conference
- Record: 61–13 (16–2 WAC)
- Head coach: Jim Brock (4th year)
- Home stadium: Packard Stadium

1975 Western Athletic Conference baseball standings
	Conf.				Overall
Team	W		L	PCT	W		L	PCT
Northern
No. 29 BYU ^{x}‍‍‍	15	–	1	.938	22	–	19	.537
Colorado State ‍‍‍	8	–	10	.444	19	–	19	.500
Wyoming ‍‍‍	6	–	12	.333	26	–	24	.520
Utah ‍‍‍	5	–	11	.313	11	–	17	.393
Southern
No. 3 Arizona State ^{x}‍‍‡‍^{y}	16	–	2	.889	61	–	13	.824
No. 13 Arizona ‍‍‍^{y}	14	–	4	.778	43	–	13	.768
New Mexico ‍‍‍	3	–	15	.167	26	–	24	.520
UTEP ‍‍‍	3	–	15	.167	18	–	26	.409
x – Division champion ‡ – Playoff champion y – Invited to the NCAA tournament As of June 30, 1975; Rankings from Collegiate Baseball

The 1975 Arizona State Sun Devils baseball team represented Arizona State University in the 1975 NCAA Division I baseball season. The Sun Devils played their home games at Packard Stadium, and played as part of the Western Athletic Conference. The team was coached by Jim Brock in his fourth season as head coach at Arizona State.

The Sun Devils reached the College World Series, their seventh appearance in Omaha, where they finished in third place after winning games against Cal State Fullerton, eventual champion Texas, and semifinalist Oklahoma, and losing a pair of games to eventual runner-up South Carolina.

== Personnel ==
=== Roster ===
1975 Arizona State Sun Devils roster
Pitchers: - Floyd Bannister; - Rick Bethke; - Rick Brewster; - Greg Cochran; - Darrell Jackson; - Jim Lysgaard; - Jim Peterson; - John Poloni; - Tom Van Der Meersche	Catchers: - Gary Allenson; - Chris Bando; - Mike Colbern; - R. J. Harrison; - Frank Lucy; Infielders: - Mike Henderson; - Dave Hudgens; - Brandt Humphry; - Jerry Maddox; - Chris Nyman; - Ken Phelps; - Tom Sain; - Clay Westlake	Outfielders: - Ken Landreaux; - Bob Pate; - Ricky Peters; - Gary Rajsich; - Garret Strong; Unknown: - Tim Burzette; - Dan Davidson; - Mike Hildebrandt; - Steve Polan; - Steve Watson

=== Coaches ===
1975 Arizona State Sun Devils baseball coaching staff
- Jim Brock - Head coach - 4th year

== Schedule and results ==
Legend
Arizona State win
Arizona State loss

1975 Arizona State Sun Devils baseball game log
Regular season

February
Date	Opponent	Site/stadium	Score	Overall record	WAC record
Feb 10	UC Santa Barbara*	Packard Stadium • Tempe, AZ	W 9–1	1–0	
Feb 11	UC Santa Barbara*	Packard Stadium • Tempe, AZ	L 3–6	1–1	
Feb 13	Stanford*	Packard Stadium • Tempe, AZ	W 18–8	2–1	
Feb 14	Stanford*	Packard Stadium • Tempe, AZ	W 10–8	3–1	
Feb 15	Stanford*	Packard Stadium • Tempe, AZ	W 4–3	4–1	
Feb 17	UC Riverside*	Packard Stadium • Tempe, AZ	W 7–0	5–1	
Feb 17	UC Riverside*	Packard Stadium • Tempe, AZ	W 8–4	6–1	
Feb 18	UC Riverside*	Packard Stadium • Tempe, AZ	W 10–0	7–1	
Feb 20	Cal State Dominguez Hills*	Packard Stadium • Tempe, AZ	W 4–1	8–1	
Feb 21	UC Irvine*	Packard Stadium • Tempe, AZ	W 5–1	9–1	
Feb 22	UC Irvine*	Packard Stadium • Tempe, AZ	W 9–0	10–1	
Feb 22	UC Irvine*	Packard Stadium • Tempe, AZ	W 7–5	11–1	
Feb 24	Cal State Fullerton*	Packard Stadium • Tempe, AZ	L 6–7	11–2	
Feb 25	Cal State Fullerton*	Packard Stadium • Tempe, AZ	W 7–2	12–2	
Feb 28	Cal State Fullerton*	Packard Stadium • Tempe, AZ	W 4–3	13–2	
Feb 28	Cal State Northridge*	Packard Stadium • Tempe, AZ	W 7–2	14–2	

March
Date	Opponent	Site/stadium	Score	Overall record	WAC record
Mar 1	Cal State Northridge*	Packard Stadium • Tempe, AZ	W 4–3	15–2	
Mar 1	Cal State Northridge*	Packard Stadium • Tempe, AZ	W 5–4	16–2	
Mar 3	Chapman*	Packard Stadium • Tempe, AZ	L 5–7	16–3	
Mar 4	Chapman*	Packard Stadium • Tempe, AZ	W 9–4	17–3	
Mar 5	Chapman*	Packard Stadium • Tempe, AZ	W 2–1	18–3	
Mar 5	UCLA*	Packard Stadium • Tempe, AZ	W 15–3	19–3	
Mar 6	La Verne*	Packard Stadium • Tempe, AZ	W 8–1	20–3	
Mar 7	La Verne*	Packard Stadium • Tempe, AZ	W 5–2	21–3	
Mar 7	Santa Clara*	Packard Stadium • Tempe, AZ	W 4–3	22–3	
Mar 8	Santa Clara*	Packard Stadium • Tempe, AZ	W 7–4	23–3	
Mar 10	Azusa Pacific*	Packard Stadium • Tempe, AZ	W 5–3	24–3	
Mar 11	Azusa Pacific*	Packard Stadium • Tempe, AZ	W 8–0	25–3	
Mar 13	Wyoming*	Packard Stadium • Tempe, AZ	W 15–3	26–3	
Mar 14	at UNLV*	Rebel Field • Paradise, NV	W 9–5	27–3	
Mar 18	at La Verne*	Ontario, CA	W 13–2	28–3	
Mar 19	at Cal State Fullerton*	Titan Field • Fullerton, CA	L 8–10	28–4	
Mar 20	at Southern California*	Dedeaux Field • Los Angeles, CA	L 3–4	28–5	
Mar 21	at Southern California*	Dedeaux Field • Los Angeles, CA	W 3–0	29–5	
Mar 25	Southern California*	Packard Stadium • Tempe, AZ	L 6–10	29–6	
Mar 26	Cal State Los Angeles*	Packard Stadium • Tempe, AZ	W 16–3	30–6	
Mar 27	BYU*	Packard Stadium • Tempe, AZ	W 15–6	31–6	
Mar 28	BYU*	Packard Stadium • Tempe, AZ	W 17–2	32–6	
Mar 29	Southern California*	Packard Stadium • Tempe, AZ	W 2–1	33–6	

April
Date	Opponent	Site/stadium	Score	Overall record	WAC record
Apr 4	New Mexico	Packard Stadium • Tempe, AZ	W 4–2	34–6	1–0
Apr 5	New Mexico	Packard Stadium • Tempe, AZ	W 5–2	35–6	2–0
Apr 5	New Mexico	Packard Stadium • Tempe, AZ	W 2–1	36–6	3–0
Apr 8	Grand Canyon*	Packard Stadium • Tempe, AZ	W 4–3	37–6	
Apr 11	at UTEP	El Paso, TX	W 9–1	38–6	4–0
Apr 12	at UTEP	El Paso, TX	W 12–0	39–6	5–0
Apr 12	at UTEP	El Paso, TX	W 18–6	40–6	6–0
Apr 15	Grand Canyon	Packard Stadium • Tempe, AZ	W 3–0	41–6	
Apr 17	at Arizona	Wildcat Field • Tucson, AZ	W 9–1	42–6	7–0
Apr 18	at Arizona	Wildcat Field • Tucson, AZ	W 17–7	43–6	8–0
Apr 19	at Arizona	Wildcat Field • Tucson, AZ	W 17–7	44–6	9–0
Apr 21	at Oklahoma*	Norman, OK	L 2–11	44–7	
Apr 21	at Oklahoma*	Norman, OK	W 4–3	45–7	
Apr 22	at Tulsa*	Tulsa, OK	L 3–4	45–8	
Apr 25	UTEP	Packard Stadium • Tempe, AZ	W 9–2	46–8	10–0
Apr 26	UTEP	Packard Stadium • Tempe, AZ	W 27–4	47–8	11–0
Apr 26	UTEP	Packard Stadium • Tempe, AZ	W 10–1	48–8	12–0

May
Date	Opponent	Site/stadium	Score	Overall record	WAC record
May 2	at New Mexico	Albuquerque, NM	W 6–1	49–8	13–0
May 3	at New Mexico	Albuquerque, NM	W 18–4	50–8	14–0
May 3	at New Mexico	Albuquerque, NM	W 4–0	51–8	15–0
May 6	Northern Arizona*	Packard Stadium • Tempe, AZ	W 6–1	52–8	
May 8	Arizona	Packard Stadium • Tempe, AZ	L 0–7	52–9	15–1
May 9	Arizona	Packard Stadium • Tempe, AZ	W 8–4	53–9	16–1
May 10	Arizona	Packard Stadium • Tempe, AZ	L 4–12	53–10	16–2

Postseason

WAC Championship
Date	Opponent	Site/stadium	Score	Overall record	Series record
May 15	BYU	Packard Stadium • Tempe, AZ	W 4–2	54–10	1–0
May 16	BYU	Packard Stadium • Tempe, AZ	W 12–1	55–10	2–0

NCAA Rocky Mountain Regional
Date	Opponent	Site/stadium	Score	Overall record	Reg Record
May 23	Washington State	Packard Stadium • Tempe, AZ	W 18–2	56–10	1–0
May 24	Puget Sound	Packard Stadium • Tempe, AZ	W 20–3	57–10	2–0
May 25	Washington State	Packard Stadium • Tempe, AZ	L 7–8	57–11	2–1
May 25	Washington State	Packard Stadium • Tempe, AZ	W 5–1	58–11	3–1

College World Series
Date	Opponent	Site/stadium	Score	Overall record	CWS record
June 6	Cal State Fullerton	Johnny Rosenblatt Stadium • Omaha, NE	W 5–3	59–11	1–0
June 8	Texas	Johnny Rosenblatt Stadium • Omaha, NE	W 5–2	60–11	2–0
June 11	South Carolina	Johnny Rosenblatt Stadium • Omaha, NE	L 3–6	60–12	2–1
June 12	Oklahoma	Johnny Rosenblatt Stadium • Omaha, NE	W 1–0^{11}	61–12	3–1
June 13	South Carolina	Johnny Rosenblatt Stadium • Omaha, NE	L 1–4	61–13	3–2
