= Steve Kemp (baseball) =

American baseball player (born 1954)

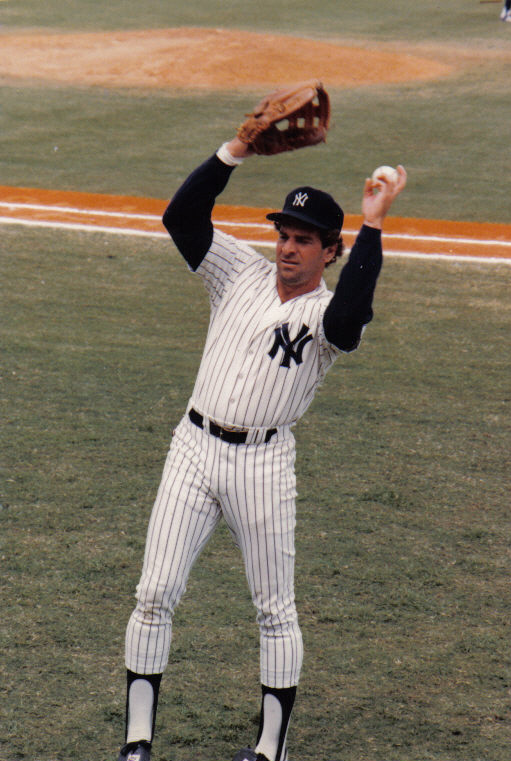
- Kemp with the New York Yankees
- Left fielder
- Born: August 7, 1954 (age 71); San Angelo, Texas, U.S.
- Batted: Left Threw: Left

MLB debut
- April 7, 1977, for the Detroit Tigers

Last MLB appearance
- May 24, 1988, for the Texas Rangers

MLB statistics
- Batting average: .278
- Home runs: 130
- Runs batted in: 634
- Stats at Baseball Reference

Teams
- Detroit Tigers (1977–1981); Chicago White Sox (1982); New York Yankees (1983–1984); Pittsburgh Pirates (1985–1986); Texas Rangers (1988)

Career highlights and awards
- All-Star (1979)
Medals
Men's baseball
Representing United States
Baseball World Cup
Gold medal – first place	1974 St. Petersburg	Team
Pan American Games
Silver medal – second place	1975 Mexico City	Team

Steven F. Kemp (born August 7, 1954) is an American former professional baseball outfielder. He played in Major League Baseball (MLB) for the Detroit Tigers, Chicago White Sox, New York Yankees, Pittsburgh Pirates, and Texas Rangers.

== Professional career ==
Kemp was the first overall selection in the January phase of the 1976 Major League Baseball draft, taken by the Detroit Tigers, and he played just one season in the minor leagues. Starting the 1977 season in the majors, he was immediately installed as the Tigers’ starting left fielder.

During his major league career, Kemp played for the Tigers (1977–1981), Chicago White Sox (1982), New York Yankees (1983–1984) and Texas Rangers (1988) all of the American League and the Pittsburgh Pirates (1985–1986) of the National League. He predominantly played in the outfield, with occasional appearances as a designated hitter or first baseman. His best season was with the Tigers in 1979, when he hit .318 with 26 home runs and 105 RBI and was named Tiger of the Year as selected by the Detroit Baseball Writers Association.

Kemp was selected for the American League All-Star team in 1979. After his major league days ended, he played a season in the Senior Professional Baseball Association.

In 1,168 games over eleven seasons, Kemp posted a .278 batting average (1,128-for-4,058) with 581 runs, 179 doubles, 25 triples, 130 home runs, 634 RBI, 39 stolen bases, 576 bases on balls, .367 on-base percentage and .431 slugging percentage. He finished his career with a .982 fielding percentage playing at left and right field.

== College career ==
Kemp played college ball at the University of Southern California in Los Angeles, under hall of fame head coach Rod Dedeaux. The Trojans won five consecutive College World Series titles in the early 1970s, and Kemp was part of the last two in 1973 in 1974; teammates included Fred Lynn, Roy Smalley, and Rich Dauer. He was an All-American in 1975.
