= 1975 South Carolina Gamecocks baseball team =

American college baseball season

1975 South Carolina Gamecocks baseball

Atlantic Regional Champions

College World Series, Runner-Up
- Conference: Independent
- Record: 51–6–1
- Head coach: Bobby Richardson (6th season)
- Assistant coach: Johnny Hunton

The 1975 South Carolina Gamecocks baseball team represented the University of South Carolina in the 1975 NCAA Division I baseball season. The team was coached by Bobby Richardson in his 6th season at South Carolina.

The Gamecocks lost the College World Series, defeated by the Texas Longhorns in the championship game.

== Roster ==
1975 South Carolina Gamecocks roster
Pitchers: 13 Earl Bass; 27 Jamie Chakales; 23 Mike Cromer; Bill Kimrey; 26 Ray Lavigne; 24 Tim Lewis; 4 Tom Luckstone; 22 Ed Lynch; 20 Scott Thomas; 16 Greg Ward	Catchers: 6 Donnie Branham; 18 Greg Keatley; 17 John Hinkel; 5 Robbie Parrish; Infielders: 25 Jim Fleming; 8 Jeff Grantz; 7 Jim Pankovits; 1 David Small; 3 Mark Van Bever	Outfielders: 15 Steve Cook; 9 Garry Hancock; 14 Steve King; Andy LeHeup; 10 Chuck McLean; 19 Don Repsher; 12 Hank Small

== Schedule and results ==
Legend
South Carolina win
South Carolina loss
South Carolina tie

1975 South Carolina Gamecocks baseball game log
Regular season (44–4–1)
February (1–0)

Date	Opponent	Site/stadium	Score	Overall Record
February 28	at Baptist	Unknown • Charleston, SC	7–6	1–0

March (19–2)

Date	Opponent	Site/stadium	Score	Overall Record
March 4	at Wofford	Unknown • Spartanburg, SC	16–1	2–0
March 5	West Virginia	Unknown • Columbia, SC	19–2	3–0
March 6	West Virginia	Unknown • Columbia, SC	19–2	4–0
March 7	Richmond	Unknown • Columbia, SC	10–1	5–0
March 8	Richmond	Unknown • Columbia, SC	6–3	6–0
March 11	at Francis Marion	Unknown • Florence, SC	1–0	7–0
March 14	Virginia	Unknown • Columbia, SC	6–0	8–0
March 14	Virginia	Unknown • Columbia, SC	5–4	9–0
March 17	vs Miami (OH)	Conrad Park • DeLand, FL	9–2	10–0
March 18	at Stetson	Conrad Park • DeLand, FL	4–2	11–0
March 19	vs Seton Hall	Conrad Park • DeLand, FL	6–5	12–0
March 20	vs Miami (OH)	Conrad Park • DeLand, FL	3–1	13–0
March 22	at Stetson	Conrad Park • DeLand, FL	6–7	13–1
March 22	vs Seton Hall	Conrad Park • DeLand, FL	3–4	13–2
March 25	Old Dominion	Unknown • Columbus, SC	19–2	14–2
March 25	Old Dominion	Unknown • Columbus, SC	10–0	15–2
March 26	George Mason	Unknown • Columbus, SC	8–0	16–2
March 27	Marshall	Unknown • Columbus, SC	9–1	17–2
March 28	at Georgia	Foley Field • Athens, GA	2–1	18–2
March 29	at Georgia	Foley Field • Athens, GA	6–0	19–2
March 31	Howard	Unknown • Columbus, SC	2–1	20–2

April (19–2)

Date	Opponent	Site/stadium	Score	Overall Record
April 1	Howard	Unknown • Columbia, SC	10–0	21–2
April 3	at North Carolina	Boshamer Stadium • Chapel Hill, NC	5–2	22–2
April 4	UNC Wilmington	Unknown • Columbia, SC	3–2	23–2
April 4	UNC Wilmington	Unknown • Columbia, SC	12–5	24–2
April 7	The Citadel	Unknown • Columbia, SC	4–2	25–2
April 8	at Erskine	Unknown • Due West, SC	3–0	26–2
April 9	Saint Leo	Unknown • Columbia, SC	2–1	27–2
April 10	Saint Leo	Unknown • Columbia, SC	6–3	28–2
April 12	North Carolina	Unknown • Columbia, SC	5–2	29–2
April 16	Clemson	Unknown • Columbia, SC	6–2	30–2
April 18	at Georgia Southern	Unknown • Statesboro, GA	2–6	30–3
April 19	at Georgia Southern	Unknown • Statesboro, GA	8–2	31–3
April 19	at Georgia Southern	Unknown • Statesboro, GA	7–4	32–3
April 21	Wofford	Unknown • Columbia, SC	5–0	33–3
April 21	Newberry	Unknown • Columbia, SC	2–0	34–3
April 22	Davidson	Unknown • Columbia, SC	3–4	34–4
April 23	Baptist	Unknown • Columbia, SC	6–2	35–4
April 24	Furman	Unknown • Columbia, SC	6–4	36–4
April 25	Georgia Southern	Unknown • Columbia, SC	9–0	37–4
April 26	Georgia Southern	Unknown • Columbia, SC	2–1	38–4
April 28	The Citadel	Unknown • Columbia, SC	8–5	39–4

May (5–0–1)

Date	Opponent	Site/stadium	Score	Overall Record
May 8	at Furman	Furman Baseball Stadium • Greenville, SC	4–3	40–4
May 9	Jacksonville	Unknown • Columbia, SC	4–0	41–4
May 10	Jacksonville	Unknown • Columbia, SC	8–1	42–4
May 12	at Western Carolina	Haywood Field • Cullowhee, NC	8–8	42–4–1
May 20	at Georgia Tech	Rose Bowl Field • Atlanta, GA	6–0	43–4–1
May 20	at Georgia Tech	Rose Bowl Field • Atlanta, GA	21–1	44–4–1

Postseason (7–2)
Atlantic Regional (3–0)

Date	Opponent	Site/stadium	Score	Overall Record
May 23	The Citadel	Unknown • Columbia, SC	11–3	45–4–1
May 24	Temple	Unknown • Columbia, SC	15–0	46–4–1
May 25	NC State	Unknown • Columbia, SC	4–3	47–4–1

1975 College World Series (4–2)

Date	Opponent	Site/stadium	Score	Overall Record
June 7	vs Seton Hall	Johnny Rosenblatt Stadium • Omaha, NE	3–1	48–4–1
June 8	vs Eastern Michigan	Johnny Rosenblatt Stadium • Omaha, NE	5–1	49–4–1
June 11	vs Arizona State	Johnny Rosenblatt Stadium • Omaha, NE	6–3	50–4–1
June 12	vs Texas	Johnny Rosenblatt Stadium • Omaha, NE	6–17	50–5–1
June 13	vs Arizona State	Johnny Rosenblatt Stadium • Omaha, NE	4–1	51–5–1
June 14	vs Texas	Johnny Rosenblatt Stadium • Omaha, NE	1–5	51–6–1

Schedule Source:

== Awards and honors ==
Mark Van Bever

- All Tournament Team

Steve Cook

- All Tournament Team

Earl Bass

- All Tournament Team

== Gamecocks in the 1975 MLB draft ==
The following members of the South Carolina Gamecocks baseball program were drafted in the 1975 Major League Baseball draft.

Round	Pick	Player	Position	MLB Club
4	90	Hank Small	OF	Atlanta Braves
11	241	Steve King	C	California Angels
13	311	Greg Ward	P	Baltimore Orioles
