= 1975 Texas Longhorns baseball team =

American college baseball season

1975 Texas Longhorns baseball

National champions SWC champions
- Conference: Southwest Conference
- CB: No. 1
- Record: 59-6 (23–1 SWC)
- Head coach: Cliff Gustafson (9th year)
- Assistant coach: Bill Bethea
- Home stadium: Disch-Falk Field

1975 Southwest Conference baseball standings
| | Conf. | | | | Overall |
| Team | W | | L | PCT | W | | L | PCT |
|---|---|---|---|---|---|---|---|---|
| No. 1 Texas ‍†‍‍^{y} | 23 | – | 1 | .958 | 59 | – | 6 | .908 |
| Texas A&M ‍‍‍^{y} | 17 | – | 7 | .708 | 32 | – | 15 | .681 |
| TCU ‍‍‍ | 12 | – | 12 | .500 | 29 | – | 17 | .630 |
| Baylor ‍‍‍ | 11 | – | 13 | .458 | 25 | – | 19 | .568 |
| Rice ‍‍‍ | 11 | – | 13 | .458 | 19 | – | 16 | .543 |
| Texas Tech ‍‍‍ | 9 | – | 15 | .375 | 22 | – | 23 | .489 |
| Arkansas ‍‍‍ | 8 | – | 14 | .364 | 20 | – | 22 | .476 |
| Houston ‍‍‍ | 8 | – | 16 | .333 | 18 | – | 25 | .419 |
| SMU ‍‍‍ | 7 | – | 15 | .318 | 12 | – | 22 | .353 |
† – Conference champion y – Invited to the NCAA tournament As of June 30, 1975; Rankings from Collegiate Baseball

The 1975 Texas Longhorns baseball team represented the University of Texas in the 1975 NCAA Division I baseball season. The Longhorns played their home games at Disch-Falk Field. The team was coached by Cliff Gustafson in his 9th season at Texas.

The Longhorns won the College World Series, defeating the South Carolina Gamecocks in the championship game.

== Roster ==
1975 Texas Longhorns roster
| Pitchers: 8 Martin Flores; 15 Don Kainer; 16 Terry Ray; 21 Jim Gideon; 24 Rich Wortham; 29 Frosty Moore; Catchers: 5 Doug Duncan; 25 Rick Bradley | Infielders: 1 Garry Pyka; 3 Keith Moreland; 4 Steve Day; 9 Blair Stouffer; 14 Mark Griffin; 22 Mickey Reichenbach | Outfielders: 10 Rusty Pounds; 17 Charles Proske; 20 Gary Hibbett; 24 Rob Stramp; 27 Mike Anderson |

== Schedule ==
1975 Texas Longhorns baseball game log
Regular season
February

| Date | Opponent | Site/stadium | Score | Overall record | SWC record |
|---|---|---|---|---|---|
| February 17 | St. Mary's | Disch-Falk Field | 4-0 | 1-0 | – |
| February 17 | St. Mary's | Disch-Falk Field | 11-0 | 2-0 | – |
| February 21 | Sam Houston State | Disch-Falk Field | 1-0 | 3-0 | – |
| February 21 | Sam Houston State | Disch-Falk Field | 9-5 | 4-0 | – |
| February 22 | Sam Houston State | Disch-Falk Field | 0-3 | 4-1 | – |
| February 22 | Sam Houston State | Disch-Falk Field | 4-7 | 4-2 | – |
| February 25 | Texas Lutheran | Disch-Falk Field | 12-3 | 5-2 | – |
| February 25 | Texas Lutheran | Disch-Falk Field | 8-3 | 6-2 | – |
| February 28 | at Houston | Cougar Field | 8-7 | 7-2 | 1-0 |

March

| Date | Opponent | Site/stadium | Score | Overall record | SWC record |
|---|---|---|---|---|---|
| March 1 | at Houston | Cougar Field | 9-2 | 8-2 | 2-0 |
| March 1 | at Houston | Cougar Field | 17-4 | 9-2 | 3-0 |
| March 3 | Lubbock Christian | Disch-Falk Field | 8-3 | 10-2 | – |
| March 3 | Lubbock Christian | Disch-Falk Field | 17-2 | 11-2 | – |
| March 4 | Lubbock Christian | Disch-Falk Field | 9-2 | 12-2 | – |
| March 4 | Lubbock Christian | Disch-Falk Field | 12-3 | 13-2 | – |
| March 7 | Rice | Disch-Falk Field | 9-1 | 14-2 | 4-0 |
| March 8 | Rice | Disch-Falk Field | 3-0 | 15-2 | 5-0 |
| March 8 | Rice | Disch-Falk Field | 9-1 | 16–2 | 6–0 |
| March 14 | Texas Tech | Disch-Falk Field | 7-1 | 17-2 | 7-0 |
| March 15 | Texas Tech | Disch-Falk Field | 7-1 | 18-2 | 8-0 |
| March 15 | Texas Tech | Disch-Falk Field | 14-1 | 19-2 | 9-0 |
| March 18 | Lamar | Disch-Falk Field | 5-7 | 19-3 | – |
| March 18 | Lamar | Disch-Falk Field | 3-0 | 20-3 | – |
| March 21 | at SMU | Armstrong Field | 6-0 | 21-3 | 10-0 |
| March 22 | at SMU | Armstrong Field | 6-4 | 22-3 | 11-0 |
| March 22 | at SMU | Armstrong Field | 5-0 | 23-3 | 12-0 |
| March 24 | Minnesota | Disch-Falk Field | 2-4 | 23-4 | – |
| March 24 | Minnesota | Disch-Falk Field | 9-3 | 24-4 | – |
| March 25 | Minnesota | Disch-Falk Field | 6-1 | 25-4 | – |
| March 25 | Minnesota | Disch-Falk Field | 6-5 | 26-4 | – |
| March 28 | Arkansas | Disch-Falk Field | 6–1 | 27-4 | 13-0 |
| March 29 | Arkansas | Disch-Falk Field | 5-1 | 28-4 | 14-0 |
| March 29 | Arkansas | Disch-Falk Field | 3-2 | 29-4 | 15-0 |

April

| Date | Opponent | Site/stadium | Score | Overall record | SWC record |
|---|---|---|---|---|---|
| April 4 | at Baylor | Ferrell Field | 18-6 | 30-4 | 16-0 |
| April 5 | at Baylor | Ferrell Field | 9-0 | 31-4 | 17-0 |
| April 5 | at Baylor | Ferrell Field | 17-4 | 32-4 | 18-0 |
| April 7 | Trinity | Disch-Falk Field | 22-4 | 33-4 | – |
| April 7 | SW Louisiana | Disch-Falk Field | 10-0 | 34-4 | – |
| April 8 | SW Louisiana | Disch-Falk Field | 6-2 | 35-4 | – |
| April 8 | SW Louisiana | Disch-Falk Field | 3-0 | 36-4 | – |
| April 18 | TCU | Disch-Falk Field | 6-5 | 37-4 | 19-0 |
| April 19 | TCU | Disch-Falk Field | 18-3 | 38-4 | 20-0 |
| April 19 | TCU | Disch-Falk Field | 14-0 | 39-4 | 21-0 |
| April 25 | at Texas A&M | Kyle Baseball Field | 15-4 | 40-4 | 22-0 |
| April 26 | at Texas A&M | Kyle Baseball Field | 11-1 | 41-4 | 23-0 |
| April 26 | at Texas A&M | Kyle Baseball Field | 8-9 | 41-5 | 23-1 |

May

| Date | Opponent | Site/stadium | Score | Overall record | SWC record |
|---|---|---|---|---|---|
| May 2 | Plano | Disch-Falk Field | 3-0 | 42-5 | - |
| May 2 | Plano | Disch-Falk Field | 5-0 | 43-5 | - |
| May 3 | Plano | Disch-Falk Field | 2-1 | 44-5 | - |
| May 3 | Plano | Disch-Falk Field | 16-0 | 45-5 | - |
| May 15 | University of Dallas | Disch-Falk Field | 7-5 | 46-5 | - |
| May 15 | University of Dallas | Disch-Falk Field | 15-1 | 47-5 | - |
| May 16 | University of Dallas | Disch-Falk Field | 2-0 | 48-5 | - |
| May 16 | University of Dallas | Disch-Falk Field | 11-0 | 49-5 | - |

Post-season
NCAA tournament: South Central Regional

| Date | Opponent | Site/stadium | Score | Overall record |
|---|---|---|---|---|
| May 22 | Louisiana Tech | Arlington Stadium | 6-2 | 50-5 |
| May 24 | South Alabama | Arlington Stadium | 7-4 | 51-5 |
| May 25 | Pan American | Arlington Stadium | 9-2 | 52-5 |

NCAA tournament: College World Series

| Date | Opponent | Site/stadium | Score | Overall record |
|---|---|---|---|---|
| June 6 | Oklahoma | Rosenblatt Stadium | 4-2 | 53-5 |
| June 8 | Arizona State | Rosenblatt Stadium | 2-5 | 53-6 |
| June 9 | Seton Hall | Rosenblatt Stadium | 12-10 | 54-6 |
| June 12 | South Carolina | Rosenblatt Stadium | 17-6 | 55-6 |
| June 14 | South Carolina | Rosenblatt Stadium | 5-1 | 56-6 |

== Awards and honors ==
Rick Bradley

- College World Series All-Tournament Team
- First Team All-SWC

Martin Flores

- First Team All-SWC

Jim Gideon

- Freshamn All-American
- First Team All-SWC

Keith Moreland

- First Team All-American
- First Team All-SWC

Garry Pyka

- First Team All-SWC

Mickey Reichenbach

- College World Series Most Outstanding Player
- First Team All-SWC

Blair Stouffer

- College World Series All-Tournament Team

Rich Wortham

- College World Series All-Tournament Team

== Longhorns in the 1975 MLB draft ==
The following members of the Texas Longhorns baseball program were drafted in the 1975 Major League Baseball draft.

| Player | Position | Round | Overall | MLB team |
|---|---|---|---|---|
| Jim Gideon | RHP | 1st | 17th | Texas Rangers |
| Richard Bradley | C | 2nd | 32nd | San Francisco Giants |
| Blair Stouffer | 3B | 5th | 113th | Texas Rangers |
| Keith Moreland | 3B | 7th | 156th | Philadelphia Phillies |
| Mike Anderson | OF | 14th | 316th | Chicago Cubs |
| Rich Wortham | LHP | 14th | 317th | New York Mets |
| Martin Flores | LHP | 23rd | 531st | San Francisco Giants |
| Mickey Reichenbach | 1B | 31st | 653rd | Texas Rangers |
