= 1975 Seton Hall Pirates baseball team =

American college baseball season

1975 Seton Hall Pirates baseball

Metro Conference champions Metro Conference Tournament champions Northeast Regional champions

College World Series, T-7th
- Conference: Metropolitan Intercollegiate Conference
- Record: 32–10 (12–4 Metro)
- Head coach: Mike Sheppard (3rd season)
- Home stadium: Owen T. Carroll Field

1975 Metropolitan Intercollegiate Conference baseball standings
	Conf.						Overall
Team	W		L		T	PCT	W		L		T	PCT
No. 6 Seton Hall ‍†‍‍^{y}	12	–	4	–	0	.750	33	–	10	–	0	.767
Fordham ‍†‍‍	12	–	4	–	0	.750	21	–	11	–	0	.656
Fairleigh Dickinson ‍‍‍	11	–	4	–	0	.733	23	–	13	–	1	.635
C. W. Post ‍‍‍	0	–	0	–	0	–	20	–	10	–	0	.667
Iona ‍‍‍	6	–	9	–	0	.400	10	–	21	–	0	.323
LIU ‍‍‍	6	–	10	–	0	.375	6	–	18	–	0	.250
Manhattan ‍‍‍	4	–	12	–	0	.250	6	–	13	–	0	.316
CCNY ‍‍‍	1	–	9	–	0	.100	1	–	16	–	0	.059
Wagner ‍‍‍	0	–	0	–	0	–	7	–	13	–	0	.350
St. Francis (NY) ‍‍‍	0	–	0	–	0	–	7	–	16	–	0	.304
† – Conference champion y – Invited to the NCAA tournament As of June 17, 1975; Rankings from Collegiate Baseball

The 1975 Seton Hall Pirates baseball team represented Seton Hall University in the 1975 NCAA Division I baseball season. The Pirates played their home games at Owen T. Carroll Field. The team was coached by Mike Sheppard in his 3rd year as head coach at Seton Hall.

The Pirates won the Northeast Regional to advance to the College World Series, where they were defeated by the Texas Longhorns.

== Roster ==
1975 Seton Hall Pirates baseball team
Players
Coaches

#	Pos.	Name	B/T	Height	Weight	Year	Home town
	INF	Rico Bellini (C)	R/R	5 ft 11 in (1.8 m)	162 lb (73 kg)	Sr	New York, New York
	INF	Ed Blankmeyer	L/R	5 ft 9 in (1.75 m)	160 lb (73 kg)	Jr	Glen Cove, New York
	RHP	Vinnie Byron	R/R	6 ft 2 in (1.88 m)	210 lb (95 kg)	So	Newark, New Jersey
	C	Rick Cerone	R/R	5 ft 11 in (1.8 m)	190 lb (86 kg)	Jr	Newark, New Jersey
	INF	Richard Cimirro	R/R	6 ft 4 in (1.93 m)	245 lb (111 kg)	Sr	Maplewood, New Jersey
	INF	Mark Costello	R/R	5 ft 7 in (1.7 m)	150 lb (68 kg)	Sr	Glen Head, New York
	RHP	Ted Czech	R/R	6 ft 2 in (1.88 m)	210 lb (95 kg)	Sr	Rutherford, New Jersey
	OF	James DeLibero	R/R	6 ft 1 in (1.85 m)	180 lb (82 kg)	So	Nutley, New Jersey
	LHP	Charles Douress	L/L	6 ft 1 in (1.85 m)	167 lb (76 kg)	Sr	Bricktown, New Jersey
	RHP	Len Glowzenski	R/R	6 ft 3 in (1.91 m)	195 lb (88 kg)	Jr	Middletown, New Jersey
		Todd Heimer	L/L	6 ft 4 in (1.93 m)	215 lb (98 kg)	So	Glen Head, New York
	OF	Bob Hemsworth	R/R	5 ft 11 in (1.8 m)	175 lb (79 kg)	Jr	New York, New York
	OF	Greg Jamison	L/R	6 ft 0 in (1.83 m)	160 lb (73 kg)	Jr	Coatesville, Pennsylvania
	OF	Tom Kober	L/R	6 ft 0 in (1.83 m)	170 lb (77 kg)	Sr	New York, New York
	RHP	Fred Kopecki	R/R	6 ft 1 in (1.85 m)	165 lb (75 kg)	So	Arlington, New Jersey
	RHP	David Lombardi	R/R	6 ft 2 in (1.88 m)	185 lb (84 kg)	Jr	Bergenfield, New Jersey
	C	Mike O'Connor	L/R	5 ft 11 in (1.8 m)	186 lb (84 kg)	So	Madison, New Jersey
	LHP	Jim McDonough	L/L	5 ft 10 in (1.78 m)	165 lb (75 kg)	So	Short Hills, New Jersey
	RHP	Charlie Puleo	R/R	6 ft 2 in (1.88 m)	180 lb (82 kg)	So	Bloomfield, New Jersey
	INF	Anthony Roselle	R/R	5 ft 11 in (1.8 m)	162 lb (73 kg)	Sr	Paterson, New Jersey
	INF	Michael Rota	R/R	5 ft 10 in (1.78 m)	170 lb (77 kg)	So	Newark, New Jersey
	OF	Ted Schoenhaus	R/R	6 ft 0 in (1.83 m)	175 lb (79 kg)	Sr	Bloomfield, New Jersey
		Ricky Sposta	L/L	5 ft 7 in (1.7 m)	155 lb (70 kg)	Sr	Little Falls, New York
	RHP	Robert Swain	R/R	5 ft 11 in (1.8 m)	178 lb (81 kg)	Sr	New York, New York
	RHP	Ken Sosnowski	R/R	5 ft 10 in (1.78 m)	170 lb (77 kg)	So	Carteret, New Jersey
	LHP	Joe Trotter	R/L	6 ft 1 in (1.85 m)	190 lb (86 kg)	Sr	Carlstadt, New Jersey
	RHP	Michael Zayac	R/R	6 ft 1 in (1.85 m)	160 lb (73 kg)	Jr	Newark, New Jersey

Head coach

Mike Sheppard

Assistant coach(es)

William Murphy
Ollie Mitchell

Legend

- (C) Team captain
- (S) Suspended
- (I) Ineligible
- Injured
- Current redshirt

== Schedule ==
1975 Seton Hall Pirates baseball game log
Regular season
March (4–3)

#	Date	Opponent	Site/stadium	Score	Overall record	Metro record
1	March 17	at Stetson	Unknown • DeLand, Florida	2–9	0–1	–
2	March 18	vs Miami (OH)	Unknown • DeLand, Florida	7–8	0–2	–
3	March 20	vs South Carolina	Unknown • DeLand, Florida	5–6	0–3	–
4	March 20	at Stetson	Unknown • DeLand, Florida	11–4	1–3	–
5	March 21	vs Miami (OH)	Unknown • DeLand, Florida	13–8	2–3	–
6	March 22	vs South Carolina	Unknown • DeLand, Florida	4–3	3–3	–
7	March	vs Iona	Unknown • Unknown	8–1	4–3	1–0

April (17–4)

#	Date	Opponent	Site/stadium	Score	Overall record	Metro record
8	April 1	at Rutgers	Bainton Field • Piscataway, New Jersey	20–1	5–3	1–0
9	April	vs St. Francis (NY)	Unknown • Unknown	9–4	6–3	2–0
10	April	vs Princeton	Owen T. Carroll Field • South Orange, New Jersey	5–4	7–3	2–0
11	April	vs Army	Unknown • Unknown	10–6	8–3	2–0
12	April	vs LIU Brooklyn	Unknown • Unknown	6–10	8–4	2–1
13	April	vs Wagner	Unknown • Unknown	14–5	9–4	3–1
14	April	vs Manhattan	Unknown • Unknown	3–5	9–5	3–2
15	April	vs Fairleigh Dickinson	Unknown • Unknown	7–2	10–5	4–2
16	April 13	Temple	Owen T. Carroll Field • South Orange, New Jersey	7–5	11–5	4–2
17	April 13	Templte	Owen T. Carroll Field • South Orange, New Jersey	0–10	11–6	4–2
18	April	vs Wagner	Unknown • Unknown	14–5	12–6	5–2
19	April	C. W. Post	Unknown • Unknown	15–4	13–6	6–2
20	April	Iona	Unknown • Unknown	7–5	14–6	7–2
21	April	Saint Peter's	Unknown • Unknown	24–1	15–6	7–2
22	April	St. Francis (NY)	Unknown • Unknown	14–5	16–6	8–2
23	April 20	Fordham	Owen T. Carroll Field • South Orange, New Jersey	7–8	17–6	8–3
24	April	C. W. Post	Unknown • Unknown	10–2	18–6	9–3
25	April	Fordham	Unknown • Unknown	7–8	18–7	9–4
26	April	Manhattan	Unknown • Unknown	10–7	19–7	10–4
27	April 27	St. John's	Owen T. Carroll Field • South Orange, New Jersey	6–4	20–7	10–4
28	April	Fairleigh Dickinson	Unknown • Unknown	5–3	21–7	11–4

May (6–0)

#	Date	Opponent	Site/stadium	Score	Overall record	Metro record
29	May	Monmouth	Unknown • Unknown	8–3	22–8	11–4
30	May 9	at St. John's	McCallen Field • New York, New York	1–0	23–8	11–4
31	May 10	Rutgers	Owen T. Carroll Field • South Orange, New Jersey	10–5	24–8	11–4
32	May	Upsala	Unknown • Unknown	10–3	25–8	11–4
33	May	LIU Brooklyn	Unknown • Unknown	13–6	26–8	12–4
34	May	Lafayette	Unknown • Unknown	5–4	27–8	12–4

Postseason
Metropolitan Conference Playoff (2–0)

#	Date	Opponent	Site/stadium	Score	Overall record	Metro record
35	May	C. W. Post	Unknown • Unknown	9–3	27–8	12–4
36	May	Fordham	Unknown • Unknown	6–2	28–8	12–4

NCAA Tournament: Northeast Regional (3–0)

#	Date	Opponent	Site/stadium	Score	Overall record	Metro record
37	May 23	vs Penn	Unknown • Stamford, Connecticut	7–5	29–8	12–4
38	May 23	vs St. John's	Unknown • Stamford, Connecticut	5–1	30–8	12–4
39	May 24	vs Maine	Unknown • Stamford, Connecticut	11–7	31–8	12–4

College World Series (1–2)

#	Date	Opponent	Site/stadium	Score	Overall record	Metro record
40	June 7	vs South Carolina	Johnny Rosenblatt Stadium • Omaha, Nebraska	1–3	31–9	12–4
41	June 8	vs Florida State	Johnny Rosenblatt Stadium • Omaha, Nebraska	11–0	32–9	12–4
42	June 9	vs Texas	Johnny Rosenblatt Stadium • Omaha, Nebraska	10–12	32–10	12–4

== Awards and honors ==
Rico Bellini

- All-District AACBC

Rick Cerone

- First Team All-American American Baseball Coaches Association
- First Team All-American College Sports Information Directors of America

Ted Schoenhaus

- All-District AACBC
