= 1975 Arizona Wildcats baseball team =

American college baseball season

1975 Arizona Wildcats baseball

West Regional
- Conference: Western Athletic Conference
- CB: No. 13
- Record: 41–13–1 (14–4 WAC)
- Head coach: Jerry Kindall (3rd season)
- Assistant coach: Jim Wing (3rd season)
- Home stadium: Wildcat Field; Hi Corbett Field (Night games)

1975 Western Athletic Conference baseball standings
	Conf.				Overall
Team	W		L	PCT	W		L	PCT
Northern
No. 29 BYU ^{x}‍‍‍	15	–	1	.938	22	–	19	.537
Colorado State ‍‍‍	8	–	10	.444	19	–	19	.500
Wyoming ‍‍‍	6	–	12	.333	26	–	24	.520
Utah ‍‍‍	5	–	11	.313	11	–	17	.393
Southern
No. 3 Arizona State ^{x}‍‍‡‍^{y}	16	–	2	.889	61	–	13	.824
No. 13 Arizona ‍‍‍^{y}	14	–	4	.778	43	–	13	.768
New Mexico ‍‍‍	3	–	15	.167	26	–	24	.520
UTEP ‍‍‍	3	–	15	.167	18	–	26	.409
x – Division champion ‡ – Playoff champion y – Invited to the NCAA tournament As of June 30, 1975; Rankings from Collegiate Baseball

The 1975 Arizona Wildcats baseball team represented the University of Arizona during the 1975 NCAA Division I baseball season. The Wildcats played their home games at Wildcat Field. The team was coached by Jerry Kindall in his 3rd season at Arizona. The Wildcats finished 41-13-1 overall and placed 2nd in the Western Athletic Conference's Southern Division with a 14–4 record. Arizona made the postseason for the 2nd straight season and were placed in the West Regional hosted by the University of Southern California at Dedeaux Field in Los Angeles, California. The Wildcats lost back-to-back games to Pepperdine and USC to end their season. This marked the final season that the program played night games at the off-campus Hi Corbett Field, as lighting was installed at their main stadium Wildcat Field midway through the season. The 1st night game at Wildcat Field was a 1–9 loss to rival Arizona State on April 18, 1975. Arizona would not play a game at Hi Corbett Field again for 37 years until moving to the stadium full-time in 2012.

== Previous season ==
The Wildcats finished the 1974 season with a record of 58-6 and 16–2 in conference play, finishing 1st in the WAC Southern. Arizona advanced to the postseason for the 1st time since 1970 and was placed in the District 7 Regional hosted by the University of Northern Colorado at Jackson Field in Greeley, Colorado. The Wildcats lost back to back games to Northern Colorado to end their season.

== Personnel ==
=== Roster ===
1975 Arizona Wildcats baseball roster
• Perry Armstrong • Ronald Bell • Kenneth Bolek • Michael Farenbaugh • David Flatt • Michael Gatlin	• Craig Giola • Ron Hassey • Michael Kirkpatrick • Al Lopez • Patrick O'Sullivan • Les Pearsey • Steven Powers	• Scott Russell • Robert Sczecinski • William Simpson • Dave Stegman • Peter Van Horne • Robert Woodside • Chuck Zopfi

=== Coaches ===
1975 Arizona Wildcats baseball coaching staff
- Jerry Kindall - Head coach
- Jim Wing - Assistant coach

== 1975 Schedule and results ==
1975 Arizona Wildcats baseball game log
Regular season
Date	Opponent	Site/Stadium	Win/Loss	Overall Record	WAC Record
Feb 14	UC Riverside	Wildcat Field • Tucson, AZ	W 11-6	1-0-0	
Feb 15	UC Riverside	Wildcat Field • Tucson, AZ	W 13-11	2-0-0	
Feb 17	Stanford	Wildcat Field • Tucson, AZ	W 21-7	3-0-0	
Feb 17	Stanford	Wildcat Field • Tucson, AZ	L 7-8	3-1-0	
Feb 18	Cal State Dominguez Hills	Wildcat Field • Tucson, AZ	L 7-11	3-2-0	
Feb 19	Cal State Dominguez Hills	Wildcat Field • Tucson, AZ	W 11-2	4-2-0	
Feb 21	San Diego State	Wildcat Field • Tucson, AZ	W 29-0	5-2-0	
Feb 22	San Diego State	Wildcat Field • Tucson, AZ	W 7-6	6-2-0	
Feb 22	San Diego State	Wildcat Field • Tucson, AZ	W 6-3	7-2-0	
Feb 26	at Grand Canyon	Brazell Field • Phoenix, AZ	W 9-4	8-2-0	
Mar 1	Cal Poly Pomona	Wildcat Field • Tucson, AZ	W 11-0	9-2-0	
Mar 1	Cal Poly Pomona	Wildcat Field • Tucson, AZ	W 11-10	10-2-0	
Mar 3	UCLA	Wildcat Field • Tucson, AZ	W 18-0	11-2-0	
Mar 4	UCLA	Wildcat Field • Tucson, AZ	W 9-2	12-2-0	
Mar 14	Northern Colorado	Wildcat Field • Tucson, AZ	W 12-3	13-2-0	
Mar 15	Northern Colorado	Wildcat Field • Tucson, AZ	W 7-3	14-2-0	
Mar 15	Northern Colorado	Hi Corbett Field • Tucson, AZ	W 8-3	15-2-0	
Mar 17	Denver	Wildcat Field • Tucson, AZ	L 5-9	15-3-0	
Mar 18	Denver	Wildcat Field • Tucson, AZ	W 9-6	16-3-0	
Mar 19	Northern Arizona	Wildcat Field • Tucson, AZ	W 19-2	17-3-0	
Mar 20	Northern Arizona	Wildcat Field • Tucson, AZ	W 10-0	18-3-0	
Mar 21	Southern Illinois	Wildcat Field • Tucson, AZ	T 4-4	18-3-1	
Mar 22	Southern Illinois	Hi Corbett Field • Tucson, AZ	W 15-0	19-3-1	
Mar 24	vs Southern Illinois	Riverside Sports Complex • Riverside, CA	L 6-11	19-4-1	
Mar 25	vs Santa Clara	Riverside Sports Complex • Riverside, CA	W 27-1	20-4-1	
Mar 26	vs Washington State	Riverside Sports Complex • Riverside, CA	L 1-3	20-5-1	
Mar 27	vs SMU	Riverside Sports Complex • Riverside, CA	W 14-2	21-5-1	
Mar 28	vs Stanford	Riverside Sports Complex • Riverside, CA	W 7-3	22-5-1	
Mar 29	vs Cornell	Riverside Sports Complex • Riverside, CA	W 9-4	23-5-1	
Mar 29	at UC Riverside	Riverside Sports Complex • Riverside, CA	L 11-12	23-6-1	
Apr 4	UTEP	Hi Corbett Field • Tucson, AZ	W 23-4	24-6-1	1-0
Apr 5	UTEP	Wildcat Field • Tucson, AZ	W 11-4	25-6-1	2-0
Apr 5	UTEP	Hi Corbett Field • Tucson, AZ	W 20-1	26-6-1	3-0
Apr 11	at New Mexico	Lobo Field • Albuquerque, NM	W 17-1	27-6-1	4-0
Apr 12	at New Mexico	Lobo Field • Albuquerque, NM	W 2-1	28-6-1	5-0
Apr 13	at New Mexico	Lobo Field • Albuquerque, NM	W 7-0	29-6-1	6-0
Apr 18	Arizona State	Wildcat Field • Tucson, AZ	L 1-9	29-7-1	6-1
Apr 19	Arizona State	Wildcat Field • Tucson, AZ	L 7-17	29-8-1	6-2
Apr 20	Arizona State	Wildcat Field • Tucson, AZ	L 7-17	29-9-1	6-3
Apr 24	New Mexico	Wildcat Field • Tucson, AZ	W 12-3	30-9-1	7-3
Apr 25	New Mexico	Wildcat Field • Tucson, AZ	W 7-4	31-9-1	8-3
Apr 26	New Mexico	Wildcat Field • Tucson, AZ	W 8-7	32-9-1	9-3
May 2	at UTEP	Dudley Field • El Paso, TX	W 15-12	33-9-1	10-3
May 3	at UTEP	Dudley Field • El Paso, TX	W 6-4	34-9-1	11-3
May 3	at UTEP	Dudley Field • El Paso, TX	W 8-2	35-9-1	12-3
May 8	at Arizona State	Packard Stadium • Tempe, AZ	W 7-0	36-9-1	13-3
May 9	at Arizona State	Packard Stadium • Tempe, AZ	L 4-8	36-10-1	13-4
May 10	at Arizona State	Packard Stadium • Tempe, AZ	W 12-4	37-10-1	14-4
WAC Playoffs
May 15	Colorado State	Wildcat Field • Tucson, AZ	L 3-4	37-11-1	
May 16	Colorado State	Wildcat Field • Tucson, AZ	W 18-3	38-11-1	
May 17	Colorado State	Wildcat Field • Tucson, AZ	W 13-5	39-11-1	
May 18	BYU	Wildcat Field • Tucson, AZ	W 7-1	40-11-1	
May 19	BYU	Wildcat Field • Tucson, AZ	W 6-1	41-11-1	
NCAA West Regional
May 23	vs Pepperdine	Dedeaux Field • Los Angeles, CA	L 3-4	41-12-1	
May 24	at USC	Dedeaux Field • Los Angeles, CA	L 0-1	41-13-1	

=== West Regional ===
West Regional Teams
Pepperdine Waves	Arizona Wildcats	Cal State Fullerton Titans	USC Trojans

== 1975 MLB draft ==
Player	Position	Round	Overall	MLB team
Mike Gatlin	INF	5 (1sc)	92	Minnesota Twins
Stephen Powers	RHP	8	171	Detroit Tigers
Dave Stegman	OF	9	207	Boston Red Sox
Ron Hassey	C	22	510	Kansas City Royals
