= Hank Small (baseball) =

American baseball player (1953-2010)

- First baseman
- Born: July 31, 1953; Atlanta, Georgia, U.S.
- Died: March 3, 2010 (aged 56); Atlanta, Georgia, U.S.
- Batted: Right Threw: Right

MLB debut
- September 27, 1978, for the Atlanta Braves

Last MLB appearance
- September 27, 1978, for the Atlanta Braves

MLB statistics
- Games played: 1
- At bats: 4
- Stats at Baseball Reference

Teams
- Atlanta Braves (1978)

George Henry Small (July 31, 1953 – March 3, 2010) was an American first baseman in Major League Baseball who played briefly for the Atlanta Braves during the 1978 season. Listed at 6 ft 3 in (1.91 m), 205 lb., Small batted and threw right-handed. He was born in Atlanta, Georgia.

== College career ==
Small attended University of South Carolina, where he hit 48 career home runs from 1972 through 1975 to set a USC record that stood until 2008.

In 1972 Small hit for a .379 batting average with four home runs as a freshman, then slumped to .282 with eight homers as a sophomore in 1973. After aluminium bats were allowed in 1974, he raised his average to .360 and belted a USC record 17 home runs in his junior season, garnering a second-team All-American selection.

In April 1974, USC hosted an exhibition game at Sarge Frye Field between the New York Yankees and New York Mets. Prior to the game, a home run hitting contest included Thurman Munson of the Yankees, Duffy Dyer of the Mets and Small, who won with a decisive home run over the left field fence.

Then, as a senior in 1975, Small batted .390 and broke his record with 19 home runs. Besides Small, the USC team featured future major league players as Garry Hancock, Greg Keatley, Ed Lynch and Jim Pankovits. USC finished second at the College World Series that year, and he earned first-team All-America honors. USC lost the championship game to University of Texas, 5–1, with Small's homer accounting for the only run.

== Professional career ==
Small was selected in the fourth round of the 1975 Major League Baseball draft by the Atlanta Braves. He was assigned to Class-A Greenwood Braves but advanced quickly through the minor league system, gaining promotions to Double-A Savannah (1976-'77) and Triple-A Richmond (1977-'78). In 1978 he led the International League with 25 home runs and 101 runs batted in, while hitting a .289 average and making the All-Star team. He earned a late-season call-up to the majors and played in one game for Atlanta on September 27. He went hitless in four at-bats in his only big-league game.

Small hit .220 with six home runs and 35 RBI for Rochester in 1979, his last professional season. In five minor league seasons, he posted a collective average of .267 (480-for-1954) in 514 games, including 53 homers and 237 RBI while scoring 170 times.

Following his baseball career, Small worked in the insurance industry for a long time and later worked for a groundskeeping company that maintained baseball diamonds.

Small died at age 56 as a result of a fall, while moving into his new home in Griffin, Georgia.

== USC honors ==
Small was inducted into the University of South Carolina Athletic Hall of Fame in 1991.

== Personal life ==
Small married college sweetheart, Margaret Fowler and they had two children, Caroline Lindsey Small and Chelsea Rebecca Small. He had a big influence on his nephew David “Chris” Small who aspired to be a great baseball player like he was and still aspires to teach youth about the great aspects of the game, like his uncle did for him.

== See also ==
- 1975 College World Series
- 1978 Atlanta Braves season
