= 1975 Florida State Seminoles baseball team =

American college baseball season

1975 Florida State Seminoles baseball

NCAA South Regional champions

College World Series, 0–2
- Conference: Independent
- Record: 49–10
- Head coach: Woody Woodward (1st year)
- Home stadium: Seminole Field

The 1975 Florida State Seminoles baseball team represented Florida State University in the 1975 NCAA Division I baseball season. The Seminoles played their home games at Seminole Field. The team was coached by Woody Woodward in his first season at Florida State.

The Seminoles reached the College World Series, their sixth appearance in Omaha, where they finished tied for seventh place after recording losses to Eastern Michigan and Seton Hall.

== Personnel ==
=== Roster ===
1975 Florida State Seminoles roster
Pitchers: - Oscar Negron - Freshman; - Ken Silvestri - (redshirt) Senior; 5 - Mike Kelley - Senior; 9 - Mitch Moyer - Senior; 12 - Larry Rothschild - Senior; 13 - Larry Jones - Sophomore; 15 - Bob Mayer - Sophomore; 16 - Craig Eaton - Junior; 17 - Mark Gilbert - Freshman; 19 - Brooks Carey - Freshman; 24 - Mike McLeod - Sophomore; 26 - John Nicholas - Junior; 27 - Danny Owen - Junior; 28 - Danny O'Brien - Junior	Catchers: - Joe Gilbert - Junior; - Joe Griffin - Junior; - Jose Lugo - Sophomore; 18 - Wayne Mears - Junior; 23 - Rick McGlone - Sophomore; 25 - Terry Kennedy - Freshman; Outfielders: - Joe Adams; - Harvey Nemeroff - Senior; 4 - Jim Busby - Sophomore; 8 - Curt Kole - Sophomore; 17 - Bob Kellogg - Senior; 21 - Carlos Lezcano - Sophomore; 22 - Steve Tebbetts - Junior	Infielders: - Paul Mauck; 1 - Randy Davidson - Senior; 2 - Carlos Rodriguez - Freshman; 3 - Guillermo Bonilla - Sophomore; 7 - Windle Higginbotham - Senior; 10 - Richard Steed - Junior; 20 - Ben Curry - Freshman; 29 - Jim Foxwell - Senior; 30 - Bill Daniel - (redshirt) Senior

=== Coaches ===
1975 Florida State Seminoles baseball coaching staff
- Woody Woodward – Head coach – 1st year
- Mike Martin – Assistant coach – 1st year

== Schedule and results ==
Legend
Florida State win
Florida State loss

1975 Florida State Seminoles baseball game log
Regular season

February/March
Date	Opponent	Site/stadium	Score	Overall record
Feb 26	at Saint Leo	Dade City, FL	W 1–0	1–0
Feb 26	at Saint Leo	Dade City, FL	W 10–4	2–0
Mar 1	Florida	Seminole Field • Tallahassee, FL	W 14–0	3–0
Mar 2	Florida	Seminole Field • Tallahassee, FL	W 6–4	4–0
Mar 6	Jacksonville	Seminole Field • Tallahassee, FL	W 6–4	5–0
Mar 6	Jacksonville	Seminole Field • Tallahassee, FL	W 12–3	6–0
Mar 7	Jacksonville	Seminole Field • Tallahassee, FL	W 8–0	7–0
Mar 8	Valdosta State	Seminole Field • Tallahassee, FL	W 9–0	8–0
Mar 9	at Valdosta State	Valdosta, GA	W 8–3	9–0
Mar 12	Mercer	Seminole Field • Tallahassee, FL	W 4–0	10–0
Mar 13	Mercer	Seminole Field • Tallahassee, FL	W 5–0	11–0
Mar 15	FIU	Seminole Field • Tallahassee, FL	W 7–5	12–0
Mar 20	Saint Leo	Seminole Field • Tallahassee, FL	W 4–0	13–0
Mar 20	Saint Leo	Seminole Field • Tallahassee, FL	W 7–2	14–0
Mar 22	at FIU	Miami, FL	W 12–4	15–0
Mar 23	vs Michigan State	Mark Light Field • Coral Gables, FL	L 3–4	15–1
Mar 24	vs Army	Mark Light Field • Coral Gables, FL	W 7–4	16–1
Mar 24	vs Michigan State	Mark Light Field • Coral Gables, FL	W 11–3	17–1
Mar 25	at Miami (FL)	Mark Light Field • Coral Gables, FL	W 3–0	18–1
Mar 26	at Miami (FL)	Mark Light Field • Coral Gables, FL	L 0–2	18–2
Mar 26	at Miami (FL)	Mark Light Field • Coral Gables, FL	W 10–7	19–2
Mar 28	Niagara	Seminole Field • Tallahassee, FL	W 16–1	20–2
Mar 29	Tampa	Seminole Field • Tallahassee, FL	W 4–3	21–2
Mar 29	Tampa	Seminole Field • Tallahassee, FL	W 10–2	22–2
Mar 31	Niagara	Seminole Field • Tallahassee, FL	W 7–2	23–2
Mar 31	Niagara	Seminole Field • Tallahassee, FL	W 10–4	24–2

April
Date	Opponent	Site/stadium	Score	Overall record
Apr 2	Columbus State	Seminole Field • Tallahassee, FL	W 10–2	25–2
Apr 4	Miami (FL)	Seminole Field • Tallahassee, FL	W 8–0	26–2
Apr 5	Miami (FL)	Seminole Field • Tallahassee, FL	W 5–2	27–2
Apr 8	South Alabama	Seminole Field • Tallahassee, FL	W 4–2	28–2
Apr 8	South Alabama	Seminole Field • Tallahassee, FL	L 4–8	28–3
Apr 9	South Alabama	Seminole Field • Tallahassee, FL	W 5–4	29–3
Apr 12	Georgia Tech	Seminole Field • Tallahassee, FL	W 11–0	30–3
Apr 13	Georgia Tech	Seminole Field • Tallahassee, FL	W 9–3	31–3
Apr 15	Auburn	Seminole Field • Tallahassee, FL	W 3–1	32–3
Apr 16	Auburn	Seminole Field • Tallahassee, FL	W 4–0	33–3
Apr 17	Stetson	Seminole Field • Tallahassee, FL	W 6–2	34–3
Apr 18	Stetson	Seminole Field • Tallahassee, FL	W 5–3	35–3
Apr 22	at Jacksonville	DeLand, FL	W 4–0	36–3
Apr 23	at Jacksonville	DeLand, FL	L 1–2	36–4
Apr 25	at Mercer	Bear Field • Macon, GA	L 2–5	36–5
Apr 26	at Mercer	Bear Field • Macon, GA	W 5–0	37–5
Apr 29	at Florida	Perry Field • Gainesville, FL	W 9–5	38–5
Apr 29	at Florida	Perry Field • Gainesville, FL	L 5–8	38–6
Apr 30	at Florida	Perry Field • Gainesville, FL	W 8–7	39–6

May
Date	Opponent	Site/stadium	Score	Overall record
May 2	Georgia Southern	Seminole Field • Tallahassee, FL	W 8–2	40–6
May 3	Georgia Southern	Seminole Field • Tallahassee, FL	W 6–0	41–6
May 4	at Georgia Southern	Statesboro, GA	W 10–5	42–6
May 4	at Georgia Southern	Statesboro, GA	W 6–3	43–6
May 5	at Georgia Southern	Statesboro, GA	L 7–8	43–7
May 7	at South Alabama	Mobile, AL	W 7–1	44–7
May 11	at Columbus State	Columbus, GA	W 6–4	45–7
May 12	at Auburn	Plainsman Park • Auburn, AL	W 4–1	46–7
May 12	at Auburn	Plainsman Park • Auburn, AL	L 3–4	46–8

Postseason

NCAA South Regional
Date	Opponent	Site/stadium	Score	Overall record	NCAAT record
May 23	Miami (FL)	Dudy Noble Field • Starkville, MS	W 1–0	47–8	1–0
May 24	LSU	Dudy Noble Field • Starkville, MS	W 4–2	48–8	2–0
May 25	Miami (FL)	Dudy Noble Field • Starkville, MS	W 6–5	49–8	3–0

College World Series
Date	Opponent	Site/stadium	Score	Overall record	CWS record
June 7	Eastern Michigan	Johnny Rosenblatt Stadium • Omaha, NE	L 1–2^{10}	49–9	0–1
June 8	Seton Hall	Johnny Rosenblatt Stadium • Omaha, NE	L 0–11	49–10	0–2
