= Don Kainer =

American baseball player (born 1955)

- Pitcher
- Born: September 3, 1955 (age 70); Houston, Texas, U.S.
- Batted: Right Threw: Right

MLB debut
- September 6, 1980, for the Texas Rangers

Last MLB appearance
- October 5, 1980, for the Texas Rangers

MLB statistics
- Win–loss record: 0–0
- Earned run average: 1.83
- Strikeouts: 10
- Stats at Baseball Reference

Teams
- Texas Rangers (1980)

Donald Wayne Kainer (born September 3, 1955) is an American former baseball player who pitched for the Texas Rangers in 1980.

== Amateur career ==
Kainer was drafted out of Milby High School in Houston by the Houston Astros but chose instead to accept a full scholarship to play college baseball for the Texas Longhorns. He was the team's fourth starting pitcher as a freshman and helped them win the 1975 NCAA Division I baseball tournament. He was selected after his junior year in the 1977 Major League Baseball draft and assigned to the Tulsa Drillers to start his professional career.

== Professional career ==
On July 1, 1977, in Kainer's first professional game, he threw a complete game shutout for the Drillers against the Shreveport Captains.

Kainer was promoted to the Major Leagues along with pitchers Brian Allard and Jerry Don Gleaton when rosters expanded in September 1980. He made his Major League debut on September 6, 1980, pitching an inning in relief of Sparky Lyle at Milwaukee County Stadium. His next three appearances would be as a starting pitcher, allowing only one run in each outing; they would also be the final games of his Major League career.

Despite his strong performance in the 1980 season, Kainer felt that he was not given a fair chance to make the Ranger's opening roster the following season. Kainer felt that manager Don Zimmer locked into a starting rotation of Jon Matlack, Ferguson Jenkins, Rick Honeycutt, Doc Medich and Danny Darwin without giving him an opportunity to earn a spot. He told the Austin American-Statesman in March 1981 that he was no longer having fun playing baseball, that he was losing money playing Minor League Baseball and that he was considering quitting if he did not get another opportunity at the big league level that year. Kainer spent the entire season in Triple-A with the Wichita Aeros and endured what was described in the Wichita Eagle-Beacon as a season that he "will want to forget." The paper wrote that he was "battered around Lawrence–Dumont Stadium like a batting practice pitcher." His 29 home runs allowed in 1981 were more than all but one other pitcher in Minor League Baseball and ten more than any other pitcher in the American Association. He admitted to reporters that his experience in Wichita damaged his confidence.

Kainer logged just one pitching appearance in Triple-A during the 1982 season; he allowed five earned runs on seven hits in two innings pitched for the Denver Bears. He was released by the Rangers in April 1982. The Wichita Eagle-Beacon blamed his downfall from being "one of the Rangers' better-looking minor-league prospects" to being out of baseball on the inflated offensive environment of Lawrence–Dumont Stadium. Randy Brown wrote that, while the ballpark's notoriously shallow outfield walls could be harmful to a developing pitcher, "it may never have happened to anyone the way it happened to Kainer." A Cincinnati Enquirer article later named Kainer as anecdotal evidence of how Lawrence–Dumont Stadium's dimensions could derail a promising young pitcher's career.

Despite only playing in the Rangers' farm system, Kainer played his home games in four different Triple-A cities between 1979–1982.

== Personal life ==
Kainer married Pamela Kay Yeager, then a student at Southwest Texas State University, in December 1978. His son, Andrew, played college baseball for UT Arlington and professionally in the Florida Marlins' farm system.

His brother, Ron, played college baseball at Sam Houston State and his nephew, Carson, played for the 2005 champion Texas Longhorns and in the Cincinnati Reds' farm system.
