= South Carolina Gamecocks baseball =

Baseball team of the University of South Carolina

South Carolina Gamecocks
- 2026 South Carolina Gamecocks baseball team
- Founded: 1892 (133 years ago)
- Overall record: 2,835–1,747–17 (.618)
- University: University of South Carolina
- Athletic director: Jeremiah Donati
- Head coach: Kevin Schnall (1st season)
- Conference: SEC
- Location: Columbia, South Carolina
- Home stadium: Founders Park (capacity: 8,242)
- Nickname: Gamecocks
- Colors: Garnet and black

College World Series champions
- 2010, 2011

College World Series runner-up
- 1975, 1977, 2002, 2012

College World Series appearances
- 1975, 1977, 1981, 1982, 1985, 2002, 2003, 2004, 2010, 2011, 2012

NCAA regional champions
- 1975, 1977, 1981, 1982, 1985, 2000, 2001, 2002, 2003, 2004, 2006, 2007, 2010, 2011, 2012, 2013, 2016, 2018, 2023

NCAA tournament appearances
- 1974, 1975, 1976, 1977, 1980, 1981, 1982, 1983, 1984, 1985, 1986, 1988, 1992, 1993, 1998, 2000, 2001, 2002, 2003, 2004, 2005, 2006, 2007, 2008, 2009, 2010, 2011, 2012, 2013, 2014, 2016, 2018, 2021, 2023, 2024

Conference tournament champions
- 2004

Conference regular season champions
- 2000, 2002, 2011

The South Carolina Gamecocks baseball team represents the University of South Carolina in NCAA Division I college baseball. South Carolina has perennially been one of the best teams in college baseball since 1970, posting 35 NCAA tournament appearances, 11 College World Series berths, 6 CWS Finals appearances and 2 National Championships: 2010 and 2011. South Carolina is one of six schools in NCAA history to win back-to-back titles. Since joining the Southeastern Conference in 1992, the team has competed in the Eastern division. South Carolina owns a stellar 32–20 record at the CWS and holds the NCAA record for consecutive wins (22) in the national tournament as well as the longest win streak ever at the CWS (12 in a row from 2010 to 2012) in which the Gamecocks played for national titles all three years.

The former interim head coach was Monte Lee. Lee took over after Paul Mainieri stepped down on March 21st, 2026. Mainieri was hired after Mark Kingston was fired following the 2024 season. Kingston became the head coach of the program after Chad Holbrook resigned following the 2018 season. Holbrook took over for Ray Tanner, who was named athletics director at USC after the 2012 season. This follows a string of three consecutive appearances in the national championship series, including two consecutive national championships. During Tanner's stint as head coach, the Gamecocks also captured three SEC titles, one SEC tournament title, seven division titles, six College World Series appearances, and 13 of their 15 straight NCAA tournaments (longest streak in the SEC at the time). Between 2010 and 2012, the Gamecocks set two NCAA records for postseason success: the most consecutive NCAA tournament wins (22) and the most consecutive wins in the College World Series (12). In 2013, South Carolina set the record for consecutive home NCAA tournament wins, with 29. The Gamecocks made their 14th appearance in the Super Regional round of the NCAA D1 Tournament in 2023, the third most in the country. The team plays its home games at Founders Park, which opened on February 21, 2009.

== Program history ==
South Carolina played its first intercollegiate game on May 2, 1895, against Wofford in Spartanburg after the faculty agreed to let the athletic teams travel outside of Columbia. After decades of lackluster performance on the diamond, South Carolina's fortunes quickly changed with the hiring of former New York Yankees second baseman Bobby Richardson in 1970. Since then, the Gamecocks have been regular NCAA tournament participants, making 35 Regional and 11 College World Series appearances.

South Carolina owns a 32–20 all-time record at the College World Series and is 141–75 in NCAA tournament play. South Carolina holds the NCAA tournament records for consecutive NCAA tournament wins (22), consecutive CWS wins (12), and consecutive home NCAA tournament wins (29). In 132 years of baseball, through 2025, South Carolina has 2,813 wins, 1,717 losses, and 17 ties.

=== Bobby Richardson era (1970–1976) ===
Richardson led the Gamecocks to their first NCAA tournament appearance in 1974, which set the stage for what would happen a year later. In 1975, South Carolina posted a 51–6–1 record, made the College World Series and played for the National Title against Texas (5–1 Longhorns victory). Richardson left South Carolina after the 1976 season, finishing his tenure with a 221–92–1 record and three NCAA tournament appearances.

=== June Raines era (1977–1996) ===
June Raines took over the Gamecocks in 1977 and picked up where Richardson left off, leading the Gamecocks to a 43–12–1 record and its second National Title game appearance in three years (2–1 loss to Arizona State). Raines led the Gamecocks to three more College World Series appearances by his final season in 1996, and he finished his tenure as the program's all-time winningest coach with a 763–380–2 overall record. During the Raines' era, South Carolina made 11 NCAA tournament appearances and posted nine 40-win seasons. The 1980s saw the program's most successful run during Raines' tenure, as the Gamecocks made eight NCAA tournaments, including seven straight from 1980 to 1986.

=== Ray Tanner era (1997–2012) ===
In 1997, Ray Tanner was hired and quickly built upon the winning tradition that Richardson created and Raines had perpetuated. In 16 seasons as the Gamecocks' skipper, Tanner compiled a 738–316 (.700) record with six College World Series appearances including finishing as National runner-up in 2002 and 2012 while winning the 2010 and 2011 NCAA National Championships. Under Tanner, the Gamecocks have made 14 NCAA tournament appearances, advanced to the Super Regionals 10 times, and have posted fourteen 40-win and five 50-win seasons. In addition, the Gamecocks won the 2000, 2002 and 2011 SEC regular season championships, the 2004 SEC Tournament Championship, and six SEC East titles (1999, 2000, 2002, 2003, 2011, 2012). In 2010, Tanner and the Gamecocks won the NCAA Championship at the old Johnny "The Blatt" Rosenblatt Stadium in Omaha, becoming the first team to win six straight games in a College World Series and the third team to win the CWS after losing its first game of the series. In 2011, Coach Tanner led the Gamecocks to a share of the 2011 Regular Season SEC Championship before winning the 2011 NCAA National Championship at the new TD Ameritrade Park in Omaha. Under Coach Tanner's guidance, South Carolina set the NCAA record for consecutive NCAA tournament wins (22) and CWS wins (12) between 2010 and 2012, as the Gamecocks became just the sixth program to win back-to-back CWS titles. On July 13, 2012, Coach Tanner accepted the position of athletics director at USC, bringing his tenure as baseball head coach to a close.

=== Chad Holbrook era (2013–2017) ===
Chad Holbrook became head coach at the start of the 2013 season and began his career on February 15, 2013. South Carolina defeated Liberty 4–3 on a day honoring Tanner. South Carolina reached the NCAA tournament in 2013, 2014, and 2016, advancing to the Super Regionals during the 2013 and 2016 season. Holbrook resigned on June 6, 2017.

=== Mark Kingston era (2018–2024) ===
Mark Kingston became head coach at the start of the 2018 season and began his career on February 16, 2018. In his first season, he led the Gamecocks to a Regional in which they won, going 3–0 in the Greenville (ECU) Regional. In 2019, South Carolina went 28–28 and missed the NCAA Tournament. In 2020, the season was cancelled due to the COVID-19 pandemic. The Gamecocks finished 12–4 before the cancellation. In 2021, the Gamecocks finished 34–23 and 16–14 in SEC play. They hosted the Columbia regional, but as a #2 seed, due to COVID-19 restrictions. They finished third, going 1–2. In 2022, South Carolina finished 27–28 overall and 13–17 in SEC play. They missed the NCAA Tournament. In 2023, the Gamecocks finished 42–21 and 16–13 in SEC play. They were selected as the 15th overall seed, hosting the Columbia regional. South Carolina went 3–0 and won the regional. They would lose both games to #2 overall seed Florida to end the season. In 2024, South Carolina went 37–24 and 13–17 in SEC play to earn a #2 seed in the Raleigh (NC State) regional. They would finish 1–2 with losses to NC State and James Madison to close out the season. On June 3, 2024, one day after the season ended, Mark Kingston was fired after seven seasons. Associate head coach Monte Lee was named interim head coach.

=== Paul Mainieri era (2025–2026) ===
On June 11, 2024, Former LSU head coach Paul Mainieri became the 31st head coach in program history. He replaced Mark Kingston, who led the program for 7 seasons (2018–2024). In 2025, South Carolina went 28-29 (6-24 SEC) and missed the NCAA Tournament. After a 12-11 start to the 2026 season, Mainieri and South Carolina mutually parted ways.

=== Kevin Schnall era (2027–Present) ===
On June 10, 2026, Kevin Schnall became the 32nd head coach in program history. He takes over the helm after a 2 year stint as head coach at Coastal Carolina. Schnall replaces Paul Mainieri, who led the program for 1 full season before being fired midway into his 2nd season.

== 2000s: SEC dominance and return to Omaha ==
In the 10 years from 2000 to 2009, South Carolina posted an impressive 468–201 overall record (179–120 SEC). The 468 overall wins ranked fourth in Division I College Baseball (first among SEC programs), and the 179 SEC victories led the conference for the decade. The Gamecocks made the NCAA tournament every season, advancing to seven Super Regionals and three College World Series (first CWS berths since 1985). In addition, South Carolina won 40 or more games each season and hit the 50-win mark on three occasions (2000, 2002, 2004). The highlight of the decade was an appearance in the 2002 National Championship game against Texas, who defeated the Gamecocks by a score of 12–6. The 2002 squad finished with a 57–18 mark, setting the record for most season victories in program history.

- 2000–2004: Winningest Program in NCAA Division I – In the five seasons from 2000 to 2004, South Carolina won more games than any other Division I College Baseball program in the nation (260–87 record). This stretch included five Super Regionals, three College World Series berths, three 50-win seasons, a 99–50 SEC record, three SEC championships (2 season and 1 tournament), and three SEC East titles.

South Carolina won eight SEC series to finish 21–9 in regular season conference play (2nd place), but posted an 0–2 mark in the SEC Tournament. Once the NCAA tournament began, however, the Gamecocks rode strong pitching and clutch hitting to win their Regional and Super Regional and earn a berth in the College World Series. After an opening game loss to Oklahoma, South Carolina reeled off four straight victories to reach the championship series against UCLA. The Gamecocks continued their hot streak, defeating the Bruins in consecutive games (7–1 and 2–1) to win the 2010 National Championship. South Carolina finished the season with a 54–16 overall record, which included an 11–1 mark in NCAA postseason play. South Carolina was the final team to win the CWS Championship in Johnny Rosenblatt Stadium, and Gamecock center fielder Jackie Bradley Jr. was named CWS Most Outstanding Player.

== 2010 National Championship ==
South Carolina won eight SEC series to finish 21–9 in regular season conference play (2nd place), but posted an 0–2 mark in the SEC Tournament. Once the NCAA tournament began, however, the Gamecocks rode strong pitching and clutch hitting to win their Regional and Super Regional and earn a berth in the College World Series. After an opening game loss to Oklahoma, South Carolina reeled off four straight victories to reach the championship series against UCLA. Just as in 2002, the Gamecocks had to defeat arch rival Clemson twice (5–1 and 4–3) to reach the tournament finals against heavily favored UCLA. The Gamecocks continued their hot streak, defeating the Bruins in consecutive games (7–1 and 2–1) to win the 2010 National Championship. South Carolina finished the season with a 54–16 overall record, which included an 11–1 mark in NCAA postseason play. South Carolina was the final team to win the CWS Championship in Johnny Rosenblatt Stadium, and Gamecock center fielder Jackie Bradley Jr. was named CWS Most Outstanding Player. This marked the university's first major athletic national championship.

== 2011 National Championship ==
South Carolina finished the 2011 regular season 44–12 (22–8 SEC) and shared the SEC regular season championship with divisional rivals Florida and Vanderbilt, but posted a 1–2 mark in the SEC Tournament in Hoover, Alabama despite their #1 overall seeding. Once the NCAA tournament began, however, the Gamecocks rode strong pitching, clutch hitting and incredible defense while cruising through their Regional and Super Regional, without a loss, on their way to a second consecutive berth in the College World Series. South Carolina proceeded to defeat Texas A&M 5–4 in their first game, then swept #1 national seed Virginia (7–1 and 3–2) in the next two, including a 13-inning win in the second matchup, to battle their way back to the CWS Championship Series versus SEC Eastern Division foe Florida. This marked the second time two teams from the SEC had participated in the Championship Series/Games. In Game 1 of the Championship Series, South Carolina lived up to their mantra as they battled to win their second straight extra inning game in the CWS, 2–1 over the Gators, in 11 innings. They had a much easier time with the favored Gators in Game 2, winning 5–2 to earn the 2011 CWS Championship and their second consecutive national title. The Gamecock defense turned an incredible nine double-plays in this CWS – no other participant turned more than three. South Carolina finished the season with a 55–14 overall record, setting a new NCAA record for consecutive post-season wins with 16, a new record for consecutive College World Series wins with 11, and became the just the sixth program in history to win back-to-back NCAA Division I Baseball Championships. South Carolina became the first team to win the College World Series in the new TD Ameritrade Park, and Gamecock second baseman Scott Wingo was named CWS Most Outstanding Player.

== National runner-up seasons ==
- 1975 – The 1975 Gamecocks won four games at the College World Series behind strong starting pitching, but were ultimately defeated twice by the Texas Longhorns. In the title game, Texas defeated South Carolina 5–1. The Gamecocks finished the season with a 51–6–1 record.
- 1977 – Just two years after finishing #2 nationally, the Gamecocks returned to Omaha in 1977. South Carolina rode solid pitching to three victories, before losing twice to Arizona State. In the title game, the Sun Devils defeated the Gamecocks 2–1. South Carolina finished the season with a 43–12–1 record.
- 2002 – The Gamecocks returned to the CWS in 2002 after not reaching Omaha since 1985. After an 11–0 loss to Georgia Tech, the Gamecocks reeled off four straight victories, including two against arch-rival Clemson. This began a streak of four straight wins (including 2010) over Clemson in Omaha's College World Series- where the Gamecocks have never lost to the Tigers. Texas defeated South Carolina 12–6 in the national championship game. The Gamecocks finished the season with a 54–16 record.
- 2012 – The Gamecocks made it back to the CWS championship series in 2012 after winning the National Championship in 2010 and 2011 with a #8 national seed. After defeating the #1 overall seed in the NCAA tournament in Florida, the Gamecocks followed with victories over Kent State and Arkansas. The Gamecocks were eliminated 2–0 by the Arizona Wildcats in the National Championship series. The Gamecocks finished the season with a 49 – 20 record.

== 50-Win seasons ==
- 1975 – The Gamecocks went 51–6–1, won the NCAA Atlantic Regional, and finished National Runner-up to Texas at the College World Series.
- 2000 – The Gamecocks went 56–10 overall (25–5 SEC), won the SEC season championship, and reached the Super Regionals.
- 2002 – The Gamecocks went 57–18 overall (21–8 SEC), won the SEC season championship, and finished National Runner-up to Texas at the College World Series.
- 2004 – The Gamecocks went 53–17 overall (17–13 SEC), won the SEC tournament championship, and reached the College World Series.
- 2010 – The Gamecocks went 54–16 overall (21–9 SEC), reached the College World Series, and defeated UCLA in the championship series to win their first National Title.
- 2011 – The Gamecocks went 55–14 overall (22–8 SEC), won a share of the SEC East and season titles, and defeated SEC rival Florida to win their second straight National Championship.

== Head coaches and all-time results ==
Head Coaches
Name	Years	Seasons	Won	Lost	Tie	Pct.
No coach	1892–1893	2	5	0	0	1.000
No team	1894	–	–	–	–	–
No coach	1895	1	0	1	0	0.000
(Mgr.) E.R. Wilson	1896	1	3	4	0	.429
(Mgr.) Lede Hagood	1897	1	4	3	0	.571
(Mgr.) W.C. Benet Jr.	1898	1	1	4	0	.200
(Mgr.) J.C. Hughes	1899	1	1	8	0	.111
(Mgr.) A.H. Brooker	1900	1	7	4	0	.636
(Mgr.) J.D. Ardrey	1901	1	6	3	0	.667
(Mgr.) G.B. Timmerman	1902	1	6	4	0	.600
W. Augustus Lee	1903–1904	2	11	6	1	.631
William Earle	1905	1	5	7	1	.423
George Needham	1906	1	1	7	0	.125
Dicky James	1907	1	11	6	0	.647
Frank Lohr	1908	1	10	3	1	.750
Dick Reid	1909	1	11	6	0	.647
Bill Breitenstein	1910	1	11	5	0	.688
P.L. Wright	1911	1	11	6	0	.647
James G. Driver	1912–1913	2	22	19	1	.536
G.I. Guerrant	1914	1	12	7	1	.625
Syd Smith	1915	1	6	11	0	.353
Bill Clark	1916; 1921–1924	5	38	49	2	.438
Dixon Foster	1917–1920	4	27	51	2	.350
Branch Bocock	1925–1927	3	17	21	0	.447
Billy Laval	1928–1934	7	89	33	1	.728
Dutch Stamman	1935–1937	3	18	25	1	.420
Catfish Smith	1938–1939; 1946–1947	4	40	48	0	.455
Ted Petoskey	1940–1942; 1948–1956	12	113	120	1	.485
Kay Kirven	1943	1	5	6	0	.455
H.W. Klocker	1944	1	4	4	0	.500
Johnny McMillan	1945	1	8	4	0	.667
Joe Grugan	1957–1963	7	51	93	0	.354
Bob Reising	1964–1965	2	31	24	0	.564
Dick Weldon	1966	1	15	8	0	.652
Jack Powers	1967–1969	3	47	40	1	.540
Bobby Richardson	1970–1976	7	220	91	2	.706
June Raines	1977–1996	20	763	380	2	.667
Ray Tanner	1997–2012	16	738	316	0	.700
Chad Holbrook	2013–2017	5	200	106	0	.654
Mark Kingston	2018–2024	7	217	155	0	.596
Paul Mainieri	2025–2026	1	40	40	0	.500
Kevin Schnall	2027–Present	1	0	0	0	
All-Time		130	2835	1752	17	.618

Year-by-Year
Season	Coach	Record				Notes
Season	Coach	Overall	Conference	NCAA	CWS	Notes
Independent
1892	No coach	1–0	–	–	–	
1893	No coach	4–0	–	–	–	
1894	No coach	–	–	–	–	No team
1895	No coach	0–1	–	–	–	
1896	No coach	3–4	–	–	–	
1897	No coach	4–3	–	–	–	
1898	No coach	1–4	–	–	–	
1899	No coach	1–8	–	–	–	
1900	No coach	7–4	–	–	–	
1901	No coach	6–3	–	–	–	
1902	No coach	6–4	–	–	–	
1903	W. Augustus Lee	8–3–1	–	–	–	
1904	W. Augustus Lee	3–3	–	–	–	
1905	William Earle	5–7–1	–	–	–	
1906	George Needham	1–7	–	–	–	
1907	Dicky James	11–6	–	–	–	
1908	Frank Lohr	10–3–1	–	–	–	
1909	Dick Reid	11–6	–	–	–	
1910	Bill Breitenstein	11–5	–	–	–	
1911	P.L. Wright	11–6	–	–	–	
1912	James G. Driver	11–11	–	–	–	
1913	James G. Driver	11–8–1	–	–	–	
1914	G.I. Guerrant	12–7–1	–	–	–	
1915	Syd Smith	6–11	–	–	–	
Southern Intercollegiate Athletic Association
1916	Bill Clark	9–14	–	–	–	
1917	Dixon Foster	4–7–2	–	–	–	
1918	Dixon Foster	11–13	–	–	–	
1919	Dixon Foster	9–13	–	–	–	
1920	Dixon Foster	3–18	–	–	–	
1921	Bill Clark	3–12–1	–	–	–	
1922	Bill Clark	8–7–1	–	–	–	
Southern Conference
1923	Bill Clark	8–8		–	–	
1924	Bill Clark	10–8		–	–	
1925	Branch Bocock	4–9		–	–	
1926	Branch Bocock	6–4		–	–	
1927	Branch Bocock	7–8		–	–	
1928	Billy Laval	7–8–1		–	–	
1929	Billy Laval	8–4		–	–	
1930	Billy Laval	14–5		–	–	
1931	Billy Laval	15–3		–	–	
1932	Billy Laval	16–7		–	–	
1933	Billy Laval	17–3		–	–	
1934	Billy Laval	12–3		–	–	
1935	Dutch Stamman	8–10		–	–	
1936	Dutch Stamman	5–9–1		–	–	
1937	Dutch Stamman	5–6		–	–	
1938	Catfish Smith	12–7		–	–	
1939	Catfish Smith	10–11		–	–	
1940	Ted Petoskey	8–9		–	–	
1941	Ted Petoskey	10–8		–	–	
1942	Ted Petoskey	6–11		–	–	
1943	Kay Kirven	5–6		–	–	
1944	H.W. Klocker	4–4		–	–	
1945	Johnny McMillan	8–4		–	–	
1946	Catfish Smith	10–13		–	–	
1947	Catfish Smith	8–17		–	–	
1948	Ted Petoskey	6–14		–	–	
1949	Ted Petoskey	15–6		–	–	
1950	Ted Petoskey	16–9–1		–	–	
1951	Ted Petoskey	6–15		–	–	
1952	Ted Petoskey	9–8		–	–	
1953	Ted Petoskey	8–11		–	–	
Atlantic Coast Conference
1954	Ted Petoskey	10–10	4–8	–	–	
1955	Ted Petoskey	10–10	7–7	–	–	
1956	Ted Petoskey	9–9	5–9	–	–	
1957	Joe Grugan	9–9	6–8	–	–	
1958	Joe Grugan	7–14	3–11	–	–	
1959	Joe Grugan	12–12	5–8	–	–	
1960	Joe Grugan	4–18	3–11	–	–	
1961	Joe Grugan	3–15	1–12	–	–	
1962	Joe Grugan	9–11	6–7	–	–	
1963	Joe Grugan	7–14	3–11	–	–	
1964	Bob Reising	15–12	6–7	–	–	
1965	Bob Reising	16–12	7–7	–	–	
1966	Dick Weldon	15–8	7–7	–	–	
1967	Jack Powers	21–8	8–5	–	–	
1968	Jack Powers	14–11	7–9	–	–	
1969	Jack Powers	12–21–1	3–15	–	–	
1970	Bobby Richardson	14–20	9–12	–	–	
1971	Bobby Richardson	18–12	7–7	–	–	
Independent
1972	Bobby Richardson	25–16	–	–	–	
1973	Bobby Richardson	26–15–1	–	–	–	
1974	Bobby Richardson	48–8	–	4–2	–	NCAA Appearance
1975	Bobby Richardson	51–6–1	–	7–2	4–2	NCAA Atlantic Regional Champs, College World Series Runners–up
1976	Bobby Richardson	38–14	–	1–2	–	NCAA Atlantic Regional
1977	June Raines	43–12–1	–	7–3	3–2	College World Series Runners–up
1978	June Raines	31–14	–	–	–	
1979	June Raines	31–16	–	–	–	
1980	June Raines	39–11	–	2–2	–	NCAA Appearance
1981	June Raines	46–15	–	5–2	2–2	College World Series Appearance
1982	June Raines	45–13	–	4–2	0–2	College World Series Appearance
1983	June Raines	35–13		0–2	–	NCAA Appearance
Metro Conference
1984	June Raines	41–18	7–4	2–2	–	NCAA Appearance
1985	June Raines	47–22	12–6	4–2	0–2	College World Series Appearance
1986	June Raines	43–23	11–6	1–2	–	NCAA Appearance
1987	June Raines	39–14	13–1	–	–	
1988	June Raines	43–21	14–3	3–2	–	NCAA Appearance
1989	June Raines	34–23	8–7	–	–	
1990	June Raines	33–25	10–6	–	–	
1991	June Raines	40–22	11–9	–	–	
Southeastern Conference (East Division)
1992	June Raines	42–22	13–11	2–2	–	NCAA Appearance
1993	June Raines	39–20–1	15–10–1	1–2	–	NCAA Appearance
1994	June Raines	35–23	11–15	–	–	
1995	June Raines	32–25	12–14	–	–	
1996	June Raines	25–28	13–17	–	–	
1997	Ray Tanner	33–24	13–17	–	–	
1998	Ray Tanner	44–18	19–10	2–2	–	NCAA Atlantic I Regional
1999	Ray Tanner	35–23	15–15	–	–	SEC East Champions
2000	Ray Tanner	56–10	25–5	4–2	–	SEC East Champions, SEC Champions, NCAA Columbia Regional Champs, NCAA Columbia Super Regional
2001	Ray Tanner	49–20	17–13	5–3	–	NCAA Columbia Regional Champs, NCAA Palo Alto Super Regional
2002	Ray Tanner	57–18	21–8	9–4	4–2	SEC East Champions, SEC Champions, NCAA Columbia Regional & Super Regional Champs, College World Series Runners–up
2003	Ray Tanner	45–22	19–11	6–2	1–2	SEC East Champions, NCAA Atlanta Regional & Columbia Super Regional Champs, College World Series Appearance
2004	Ray Tanner	53–17	17–13	8–2	3–2	SEC Tournament Champions, NCAA Columbia Regional & Super Regional Champs, College World Series Appearance
2005	Ray Tanner	41–23	16–14	3–2	–	NCAA Atlanta Regional
2006	Ray Tanner	41–25	15–15	4–3	–	NCAA Charlottesville Regional Champs, NCAA Athens Super Regional
2007	Ray Tanner	46–20	17–13	4–2	–	NCAA Columbia Regional Champs, NCAA Chapel Hill Super Regional
2008	Ray Tanner	40–23	15–15	2–2	–	NCAA Raleigh Regional
2009	Ray Tanner	40–23	17–13	2–2	–	NCAA Greenville Regional
2010	Ray Tanner	54–16	21–9	11–1	6–1	NCAA Columbia Regional & Myrtle Beach Super Regional Champs, College World Series Champions
2011	Ray Tanner	55–14	22–8	10–0	5–0	SEC East Champions, SEC Champions, NCAA Columbia Regional and Super Regional Champions, College World Series Champions
2012	Ray Tanner	49–20	18–11	9–3	4–3	SEC East Champions, NCAA Columbia Regional and Super Regional Champions, College World Series Runners–up
2013	Chad Holbrook	43–20	17–12	4–2	–	NCAA Columbia Regional Champs, NCAA Chapel Hill Super Regional
2014	Chad Holbrook	44–18	18–12	2–2	–	NCAA Columbia Regional
2015	Chad Holbrook	32–25	13–17	–	–	
2016	Chad Holbrook	46–18	20–9	4–3	–	SEC East Champions, NCAA Columbia Regional Champions, NCAA Columbia Super Regional
2017	Chad Holbrook	35–25	13–17	–	–	
2018	Mark Kingston	37–26	17–13	4–2	–	NCAA Greenville Regional Champions, NCAA Fayetteville Super Regional
2019	Mark Kingston	28–28	8–22	–	–	
2020	Mark Kingston	12–4	0–0	–	–	Rest of season canceled due to COVID-19
2021	Mark Kingston	34–23	16–14	1–2	–	NCAA Columbia Regional
2022	Mark Kingston	27–28	13–17	–	–	
2023	Mark Kingston	42–21	16–13	3–2		NCAA Columbia Regional Champions, NCAA Gainesville Super Regional
2024	Mark Kingston	37–26	13–17	1–2		NCAA Raleigh Regional
2025	Paul Mainieri	28–29	6–24			
2026	Paul Mainieri	12–11	0–4			
2027	Kevin Schnall	0–0	0–0			
All-Time		2835–1752–17	529-471-1	141–75	32–20	35 NCAA tournaments, 19 Regional Championships, 11 CWS appearances, 4 National Runner-up finishes, 2 National Championships

== Program achievements ==
National Champions	2010, 2011
National Runners-up	1975, 1977, 2002, 2012
CWS Appearances	1975, 1977, 1981, 1982, 1985, 2002, 2003, 2004, 2010, 2011, 2012
NCAA Super Regionals*	2000, 2001, 2002, 2003, 2004, 2006, 2007, 2010, 2011, 2012, 2013, 2016, 2018, 2023
SEC Champions	2000, 2002, 2011
SEC East Champions	1999, 2000, 2002, 2003, 2011, 2012, 2016
SEC Tournament Champions	2004

- Super Regional play was implemented by the NCAA in 1999.

== Awards ==
- Golden Spikes Award – Kip Bouknight (2000)
- Collegiate Baseball Player of the Year Award – Kip Bouknight (2000)
- College World Series MVP – Jackie Bradley Jr. (2010), Scott Wingo (2011)
- National Coach of the Year – Ray Tanner (2000, 2010, 2011)
- National Assistant Coach of the Year – Jim Toman (2002), Chad Holbrook (2011)
- SEC H. Boyd McWhorter Scholar-Athlete of the Year – Trey Dyson (2002), Michael Roth (2012)
- SEC Player of the Year – Kip Bouknight (2000), Yaron Peters (2002)
- SEC Pitcher of the Year – David Marchbanks (2003)
- SEC Coach of the Year – Ray Tanner (1998, 2000, 2011)
- Lefty Gomez Plate Award winner as outstanding amateur baseball player of the year- Randy Martz (1977)

== South Carolina's 1st Team All-Americans ==
Player	Position	Year(s)	Selectors
Hank Small	First Base	1975†	ABCA
Earl Bass	Pitcher	1974†, 1975†	ABCA
Randy Martz	Pitcher	1977†	ABCA
John Marquardt	Third Base	1978†	ABCA
Joe Kucharski	Pitcher	1982†	ABCA
Mike Cook	Pitcher	1985†	ABCA, BA
Joe Biernat	INF	1993	NCBWA
Ryan Bordenick	Designated Hitter/Catcher	1997, 1998	ABCA, NCBWA
Adam Everett	Shortstop	1998	BA
Mike Curry	Outfielder	1998	BA
Kip Bouknight	Pitcher	2000†	ABCA, BA, CB
Lee Gronkiewicz	Pitcher	2001†	ABCA, CB, NCBWA
Yaron Peters	First Base	2002	ABCA, BA
Blake Taylor	Pitcher	2002	BA
David Marchbanks	Pitcher	2003†	NCBWA, BA, CB
Landon Powell	Catcher	2003, 2004	NCBWA
Chad Blackwell	Pitcher	2004	College Baseball Insider
Justin Smoak	First Base	2008†	ABCA, BA, NCBWA, CB
Michael Roth	Pitcher	2011	BA
Kyle Martin	First Base	2015	BA
Ethan Petry	Outfielder	2023	BA, CB
Source:"SEC All-Americas". secsports.com. Archived from the original on May 28, 2008. ABCA: American Baseball Coaches Association BA: Baseball America CB: Collegiate Baseball NCBWA: National Collegiate Baseball Writers Association † Denotes consensus All-American

== Notable players ==
=== Gamecocks in Major League Baseball ===
As of 2025, 60 former Gamecocks have seen action in the Major Leagues. Eight players were active for more than 10 seasons: Brian Roberts (14), Steve Pearce (13), Dave Hollins (12), Mookie Wilson (12), Adam Everett (11), Justin Smoak (11), Christian Walker (11), Jackie Bradley Jr. (11).

In the 2018 World Series, former Gamecock Steve Pearce won the 2018 World Series Most Valuable Player Award as he led the Boston Red Sox to their 9th World Series title in Franchise history. Jackie Bradley Jr. won the 2018 ALCS MVP.

During the 2025 season, there have been four active players on MLB rosters:

- Clarke Schmidt – New York Yankees
- Christian Walker – Houston Astros
- Carmen Mlodzinski – Pittsburgh Pirates
- Jonah Bride – Minnesota Twins

=== Gamecocks who are World Series champions ===
- Mookie Wilson – 1986
- Steve Pearce – 2018 World Series MVP
- Jackie Bradley Jr. – 2018 American League Championship Series MVP

=== Gamecock Olympians ===
- Adam Everrett – SS in 2000
- Ray Tanner – Assistant Coach in 1996, 2000

=== Gamecocks in Team USA ===
- Dave Hollins – 3B in 1986
- Brian Williams – P in 1989
- Jared Baker – P in 1991
- Jason Haynie – P in 1993, 1994
- Adam Everett – SS in 1997
- Landon Powell – C in 2002
- Matt Campbell – P in 2003
- Justin Smoak – 1B in 2007
- Jackie Bradley Jr. – OF in 2010
- Grayson Greiner – C in 2013
- Ray Tanner – Head Coach in 2003

== See also ==
- List of NCAA Division I baseball programs
