= Greg Keatley =

American baseball player (born 1953)

- Catcher
- Born: September 12, 1953 (age 72); Princeton, West Virginia, U.S.
- Batted: Right Threw: Right

MLB debut
- September 27, 1981, for the Kansas City Royals

Last MLB appearance
- October 5, 1981, for the Kansas City Royals

MLB statistics
- At-bats: 0
- Games played: 2
- Stats at Baseball Reference

Teams
- Kansas City Royals (1981)

Gregory Steven Keatley (born September 12, 1953) is an American former Major League Baseball catcher who played for one season. He played in two games for the Kansas City Royals during the 1981 Kansas City Royals season.

Upon graduating from North Miami Senior High School in 1972, Keatley enrolled at Florida State University on a college football scholarship. However, upon learning that the Seminoles coaches planned to move him from quarterback to linebacker, he transferred to Miami Dade Junior College North while still in his first semester. As a sophomore at Miami Dade North, he transitioned to catcher and played well enough to be selected in the fifteenth round of the 1974 Major League Baseball draft but, as a New York Yankees fan, could not resist a scholarship offer to continue playing college baseball at the University of South Carolina for former Yankee Bobby Richardson. At South Carolina, Keatley set a Gamecocks record with a 25-game hitting streak. That record stood for 34 years until being broken by Whit Merrifield in 2010. After two years at South Carolina, he was drafted in the 1976 Major League Baseball draft by the Chicago Cubs.

Keatley was promoted to the Major Leagues by the Kansas City Royals for the first time on September 7, 1981 along with Onix Concepcion, Billy Paschall, Ken Phelps, Jeff Schattinger and Pat Sheridan. Before even appearing in a game, Keatley was in the news when he and teammate Willie Wilson had to restrain teammate George Brett from attacking sportswriter Mike Fish at a hotel in Anaheim. Keatley did not get into his first Major League game until September 27, 1981. He entered as a defensive replacement for Jamie Quirk in the ninth inning of a game at Royals Stadium against the Seattle Mariners and caught a 1-2-3 inning from Dan Quisenberry. His next game would be his final in the majors. On October 5, he again entered as a ninth-inning defensive replacement, this time for John Wathan in a game against the Cleveland Indians at Cleveland Stadium. He caught another 1-2-3 inning from pitcher Atlee Hammaker. As of April 2024, no Major League Baseball player has appeared in more games without pitching, hitting or being a baserunner.

Keatley's 1982 season with the Omaha Royals would be his final in professional baseball. After his playing career, he lived with his wife, Karen, and children, Brett and Brandon, in the Lexington, South Carolina area while working for more than two decades for Johnson Controls.
