= Jerry Maddox =

American baseball player (born 1953)

- Third baseman
- Born: July 28, 1953 (age 73); Whittier, California, U.S.
- Batted: Right Threw: Right

MLB debut
- June 3, 1978, for the Atlanta Braves

Last MLB appearance
- June 16, 1978, for the Atlanta Braves

MLB statistics
- Batting average: .214
- Home runs: 0
- Runs batted in: 1
- Stats at Baseball Reference

Teams
- Atlanta Braves (1978)

Jerry Glenn Maddox (born July 28, 1953) is an American former Major League Baseball player. He played one season with the Atlanta Braves between June 3 and June 16, 1978.
