= 1976 College Baseball All-America Team =

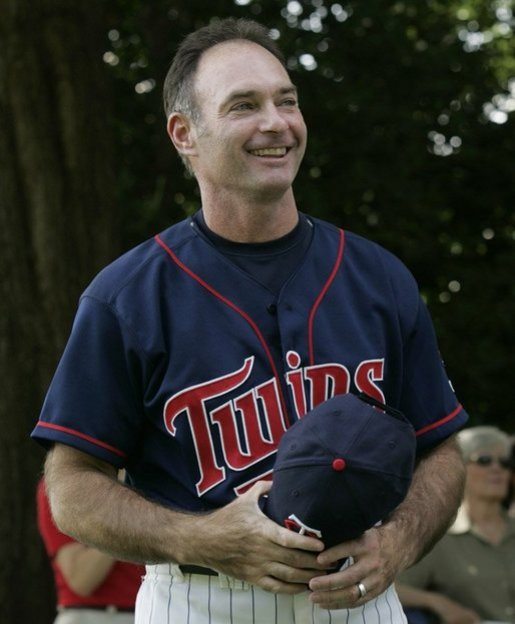
1976 All-Americans included National Baseball Hall of Famer Paul Molitor.

This is a list of college baseball players named first team All-Americans for the 1976 NCAA Division I baseball season. From 1964 to 1980, there were two generally recognized All-America selectors for baseball: the American Baseball Coaches Association and The Sporting News.

== Key ==
A	American Baseball Coaches Association
S	The Sporting News
	Member of the National College Baseball Hall of Fame
	Consensus All-American – selected by both organizations
	Consensus All-American – selected by one organization

== All-Americans ==
Position	Name	School	#	A	S	Other awards and honors
Pitcher	Floyd Bannister	Arizona State	2	✓	✓	The Sporting News Player of the Year First overall pick in the 1976 MLB draft
Pitcher	Steve Mura	Tulane	1	—	✓	
Pitcher	Richard Wortham	Texas	1	✓	—	
Catcher	Terry Kennedy	Florida State	1	—	✓	
Catcher	Jerry Willeford	Houston	1	✓	—	
First baseman	Rick Honeycutt	Tennessee	1	✓	—	
First baseman	Kelly Snider	Oklahoma	1	—	✓	
Second baseman	Keith Drumright	Oklahoma	1	—	✓	
Second baseman	Greg Vogel	Penn State	1	✓	—	
Shortstop	Glenn Gulliver	Eastern Michigan	1	—	✓	
Shortstop	Paul Molitor	Minnesota	1	✓	—	
Third baseman	Guillermo Bonilla	Florida State	1	✓	—	
Third baseman	Jim Pankovits	South Carolina	1	—	✓	
Outfielder / DH	Bill Ewing	Wyoming	2	✓	✓	
Outfielder	Ken Landreaux	Arizona State	2	✓	✓	
Outfielder	John Northrup	Central Michigan	1	✓	—	
Outfielder	Dave Stegman	Arizona	2	✓	✓	
Designated hitter	Mike Colbern	Arizona State	1	—	✓	

== See also ==
- List of college baseball awards
