= Oklahoma Sooners baseball statistical leaders =

The Oklahoma Sooners baseball statistical leaders are individual statistical leaders of the Oklahoma Sooners baseball program in various categories, including batting average, home runs, runs batted in, runs, hits, stolen bases, ERA, and Strikeouts. Within those areas, the lists identify single-game, single-season, and career leaders. The Sooners represent the University of Oklahoma in the NCAA's Southeastern Conference.

Oklahoma began competing in intercollegiate baseball in 1898. These lists are updated through the end of the 2026 season.

== Batting Average ==
Career (Min. 250 AB)
Rk	Player	AVG	Seasons
1	Dale Mitchell	.467	1942 1946
2	Kevin Burdick	.420	1986 1987
3	Ron Leon	.393	1983 1984
4	Chris Ebright	.392	1987 1988 1989
5	Scott Campbell	.386	1989 1990 1991
6	Ray Hayward	.381	1980 1981 1982 1983
	Casey Bookout	.381	1996 1997 1998 1999
8	Bobby Brown	.373	1995 1996
9	Willy Hill	.367	1995 1996 1997 1998
	Ole Sheldon	.367	2004
	Baine Brooks	.367	1986 1987

Season (Min. 100 AB)
Rk	Player	AVG	Season
1	Dale Mitchell	.507	1946
2	Chris Ebright	.460	1987
3	Ray Myers	.454	1934
4	John Toal	.440	1984
5	Kevin Burdick	.439	1986
6	Bus Wall	.436	1931
7	Greg Dobbs	.428	2001
8	Victor Lasater	.420	1940
	Dale Mitchell	.420	1942
10	Scott Campbell	.415	1990
	Ron Leon	.415	1984

== Home Runs ==
Career
Rk	Player	HR	Seasons
1	Casey Bookout	60	1996 1997 1998 1999
2	Brian Shackelford	55	1995 1996 1997 1998
3	Rick Park	51	1997 1998 1999 2000
4	John Russell	48	1980 1981 1982
5	Chris Ebright	45	1987 1988 1989
6	Kevin Pearson	43	1983 1984 1985 1986
7	Jeff Kaye	39	1982 1983 1984 1985
	Damon Minor	39	1993 1994 1995 1996
9	Peyton Graham	34	2020 2021 2022
10	Brian Eldridge	31	1991 1992

Season
Rk	Player	HR	Season
1	Casey Bookout	26	1998
2	Marty Neff	24	1991
3	Brian Eldridge	23	1992
4	Kevin Pearson	21	1986
	Brian Shackelford	21	1998
6	Peyton Graham	20	2022
	John Russell	20	1982
8	Jeff Kaye	18	1985
	Chris Ebright	18	1988
	Rick Park	18	2000
	Deiten Lachance	18	2026

Single Game
Rk	Player	HR	Season	Opponent
1	10 players	3	Most recent: Deiten Lachance, 2026 vs. Tennessee	

== Runs Batted In ==
Career
Rk	Player	RBI	Seasons
1	Brian Shackelford	251	1995 1996 1997 1998
2	Chris Ebright	239	1987 1988 1989
3	Rick Park	228	1997 1998 1999 2000
4	Casey Bookout	220	1996 1997 1998 1999
5	Rich Hills	190	1992 1993 1994 1995
6	Kevin Pearson	186	1983 1984 1985 1986
7	Easton Carmichael	174	2023 2024 2025
	Damon Minor	171	1993 1994 1995 1996
9	Garrett Buechele	168	2009 2010 2011
10	Kelly Snider	167	1974 1975 1976
	Aaron Baker	167	2007 2008 2009

Season
Rk	Player	RBI	Season
1	Kevin Burdick	91	1986
2	Chris Ebright	89	1987
3	Chris Ebright	87	1988
	Marty Neff	87	1991
5	Brian Shackelford	80	1998
6	Brian Eldridge	77	1992
7	Kevin Pearson	76	1986
	Casey Bookout	76	1998
9	Rick Park	75	2000
10	Peyton Graham	71	2022

Single Game
Rk	Player	RBI	Season	Opponent
1	2 players	9	Most recent: Chris Ebright, 1987 vs. Oklahoma City	

== Runs ==
Career
Rk	Player	R	Seasons
1	Chris Ebright	209	1987 1988 1989
2	Brian Shackelford	205	1995 1996 1997 1998
3	Terry Bogener	198	1975 1976 1977 1978
4	Casey Bookout	193	1996 1997 1998 1999
5	Kevin Pearson	190	1983 1984 1985 1986
6	Keith Drumright	185	1973 1974 1975 1976
7	Rich Hills	184	1992 1993 1994 1995
8	Rick Park	181	1997 1998 1999 2000
9	Mark Cole	178	1987 1988 1989
	Willy Hill	178	1995 1996 1997 1998

Season
Rk	Player	R	Season
1	Kevin Burdick	83	1986
2	Kevin Burdick	80	1987
3	Chris Ebright	78	1987
4	John Toal	76	1986
	Jamie Johnson	76	2009
6	Peyton Graham	75	2022
	Kevin Castleberry	75	1989
	Derek Wathan	75	1998
9	Todd Butler	74	1988
	Chris Ebright	74	1988
	Darvin Taylor	74	1994
	Casey Bookout	74	1998

Single Game
Rk	Player	R	Season	Opponent
1	Evan Mistich	6	2011	UAPB

== Hits ==
Career
Rk	Player	H	Seasons
1	Keith Drumright	295	1973 1974 1975 1976
2	Rich Hills	290	1992 1993 1994 1995
3	Brian Shackelford	285	1995 1996 1997 1998
4	Rick Park	282	1997 1998 1999 2000
5	Casey Bookout	275	1996 1997 1998 1999
6	Max White	269	2010 2011 2012 2013
7	Willy Hill	267	1995 1996 1997 1998
8	Javier Flores	264	1994 1995 1996 1997
9	Chris Ebright	258	1987 1988 1989
10	Garrett Buechele	253	2009 2010 2011

Season
Rk	Player	H	Season
1	Kevin Burdick	118	1986
2	Tanner Tredaway	105	2022
3	Greg Dobbs	104	2001
4	Keith Drumright	103	1976
5	Derek Wathan	102	1998
6	Kevin Burdick	101	1987
7	Ryan Rohlinger	99	2006
8	Willy Hill	98	1998
9	Chris Ebright	96	1988
10	Rick Gutierrez	95	1994
	Chuckie Caufield	95	2006

Single Game
Rk	Player	H	Season	Opponent
1	Craig Aikin	6	2015	Little Rock

== Stolen Bases ==
Career
Rk	Player	SB	Seasons
1	Terry Bogener	116	1975 1976 1977 1978
2	Keith Drumright	92	1973 1974 1975 1976
3	Baine Brooks	74	1986 1987
	Byron Mathews	74	1990 1991 1992
5	Bill Severns	70	1972 1973 1974 1975
6	Aric Thomas	61	1994 1995
7	Kevin Castleberry	60	1987 1988 1989
8	Derek Wathan	58	1996 1997 1998
9	Willy Hill	57	1995 1996 1997 1998
	Kendall Pettis	57	2020 2021 2022 2023 2024

Season
Rk	Player	SB	Season
1	Todd Butler	46	1988
2	Kevin Castleberry	43	1989
3	Terry Bogener	42	1976
4	Baine Brooks	38	1986
	Aric Thomas	38	1995
6	Reggie Willits	37	2003
7	Baine Brooks	36	1987
8	Keith Drumright	34	1976
9	Terry Bogener	33	1975
10	Joe Simpson	32	1973
	Rick Gutierrez	32	1994

== Earned Run Average ==
Career (Min. 75 IP)
Rk	Player	ERA	Seasons
1	Mark Nipp	1.15	1977 1978
2	Jackson Todd	1.50	1971 1972 1973
3	Kim Cook	2.01	1969 1970 1971 1972
	JB Olson	2.01	2016 2017
5	Breen Newcomer	2.02	1974 1975
	Stan Meek	2.02	1972 1973 1974
7	Eddie Fisher	2.13	1956 1957 1958
8	Bob Shirley	2.16	1973 1974 1975
9	Bucky Buckles	2.22	1994
10	Mickey Lashley	2.23	1973 1974 1975 1976

Season (Min. 50 IP)
Rk	Player	ERA	Season
1	Mark Nipp	0.72	1977
2	Mickey Lashley	0.93	1974
3	Dick Brown	1.06	1969
	Glenn Cannon	1.06	1931
5	Jackson Todd	1.19	1972
6	Eddie Fisher	1.20	1957
7	Ken Palmer	1.29	1975
8	Stan Meek	1.31	1974
9	Marty Kunkler	1.59	1975
10	Jonathan Gray	1.64	2013

== Strikeouts ==
Career
Rk	Player	K	Seasons
1	Mark Roberts	338	2001 2002 2003 2004
2	Mark Redman	294	1994 1995
	Austin Mix	294	2000 2001 2002 2003
4	Ray Hayward	293	1980 1981 1982 1983
5	Daniel McCutchen	291	2004 2005 2006
6	David Purcey	281	2002 2003 2004
7	Bob Shirley	271	1973 1974 1975
8	Matt Ruebel	266	1989 1990 1991
9	Dillon Overton	264	2011 2012 2013
10	Jackson Todd	263	1971 1972 1973

Season
Rk	Player	K	Season
1	Mark Redman	158	1995
2	Daniel McCutchen	147	2006
	Jonathan Gray	147	2013
4	Geoff Geary	142	1998
5	Mark Redman	136	1994
6	Mark Roberts	134	2004
7	Jake Bennett	133	2022
8	David Purcey	130	2004
9	Jack Armstrong	129	1987
10	Bob Shirley	126	1975
	Dillon Overton	126	2012

Single Game
Rk	Player	K	Season	Opponent
1	Jerry Haddock	20	1963	Kansas State
2	Hal Cumberland	17	1941	Kansas State
	Bobby Witt	17	1985	Texas
4	Levi Prater	15	2019	Missouri State
	Jared Hoerman	15	1999	OCU
	Jackson Todd	15	1972	LSU
