= 1976 NCAA Division I baseball tournament =

- Season: 1976
- Teams: 34
- Finals site: Johnny Rosenblatt Stadium; Omaha, Nebraska
- Champions: Arizona (1st title)
- Runner-up: Eastern Michigan (2nd CWS Appearance)
- Winning coach: Jerry Kindall (1st title)
- MOP: Steve Powers (Arizona)

The 1976 NCAA Division I baseball tournament was played at the end of the 1976 NCAA Division I baseball season to determine the national champion of college baseball. The tournament concluded with eight teams competing in the College World Series, a double-elimination tournament in its thirtieth year. Eight regional competitions were held to determine the participants in the final event. Seven regions held a four team, double-elimination tournament while one region included six teams, resulting in 34 teams participating in the tournament at the conclusion of their regular season, and in some cases, after a conference tournament. The thirtieth tournament's champion was Arizona, coached by Jerry Kindall. The Most Outstanding Player was Steve Powers of Arizona.

== Regionals ==
Seven of the eight regionals were played as 4-team double-elimination tournaments. One regional was played as a 6-team double-elimination tournament. The winner of each regional moved onto the College World Series.

=== Atlantic Regional ===
Games played in Columbia, South Carolina.

First Round
Clemson	13
Furman	2
South Carolina	7*
Virginia Tech	6*
Lower round 1
Furman	5
Virginia Tech	4

Semi-Finals
Clemson	10
South Carolina	4
Lower final
South Carolina	1
Furman	12

Finals
Clemson	6	—
Furman	2	—

=== Rocky Mountain Regional ===
Games played in Tempe, Arizona.

First Round
Memphis	6
Minnesota	0
Arizona State	13
Gonzaga	2
Lower round 1
Minnesota	4
Gonzaga	0

Semi-Finals
Memphis	4
Arizona State	11
Lower final
Memphis	4
Minnesota	17

Finals
Arizona State	12	—
Minnesota	5	—

=== Mideast Regional ===
Games played in Ypsilanti, Michigan.

First Round
Illinois State	5
Southern Illinois	2
Eastern Michigan	6
Michigan	0
Lower round 1
Southern Illinois	0
Michigan	2

Semi-Finals
Illinois State	0
Eastern Michigan	3
Lower final
Illinois State	4
Michigan	5

Finals
Eastern Michigan	3	6
Michigan	5	0

=== South Regional ===
Games played in Tallahassee, Florida.

First Round
Auburn	10
Middle Tennessee	5
Florida State	6
Jacksonville	1
Lower round 1
Middle Tennessee	5
Jacksonville	8

Semi-Finals
Auburn	2
Florida State	1
Lower final
Florida State	7
Jacksonville	9

Finals
Auburn	7	—
Jacksonville	5	—

=== Midwest Regional ===
Games played in Edinburg, Texas.

First Round
Missouri	5
Texas A&M	3
Arizona	5
Texas–Pan American	0
Lower round 1
Texas A&M	2
Texas–Pan American	1

Semi-Finals
Missouri	1
Arizona	10
Lower final
Missouri	3
Texas A&M	12

Finals
Arizona	8	—
Texas A&M	2	—

=== South Central Regional ===
Games played in Arlington, Texas.

First Round
Oklahoma	11
Miami (FL)	3
Texas	3
Lamar	2
Lower round 1
Miami (FL)	6
Lamar	0

Semi-Finals
Oklahoma	3
Texas	2
Lower final
Texas	5
Miami (FL)	0

Finals
Oklahoma	5*	4
Texas	6*	1

=== West Regional ===
Games played in Pullman, Washington.

First Round
Cal State Fullerton	7
Northern Colorado	1
Washington State	8
Pepperdine	2
Lower round 1
Pepperdine	4
Northern Colorado	2

Semi-Finals
Cal State Fullerton	1
Washington State	5
Lower final
Cal State Fullerton	11
Pepperdine	3

Finals
Washington State	1	7
Cal State Fullerton	13	2

=== Northeast Regional ===
Games played in Middletown, Connecticut.

First Round
1	Seton Hall	8
6	St. John's	0
2	Temple	6
5	Columbia	2
3	Maine	11
4	Penn State	4

Second Round
Seton Hall	3
Penn State	2
Temple	3
Maine	6
Columbia	5
St. John's	12

Third Round
Seton Hall	1
Maine	3
St. John's	3
Temple	4

Semi-Finals
Seton Hall	1
Temple	0

Finals
Maine	4	—
Seton Hall	2	—

== College World Series ==
=== Participants ===
School	Conference	Record (conference)	Head coach	CWS appearances	CWS best finish	CWS record
Arizona	WAC	51–16 (12–6)	Jerry Kindall	9 (last: 1970)	2nd (1956, 1958, 1960)	17–18
Arizona State	WAC	62–8 (17–1)	Jim Brock	7 (last: 1975)	1st (1965, 1967, 1969)	26–11
Auburn	SEC	37–13 (12–7)	Paul Nix	1 (last: 1967)	4th (1967)	2–2
Clemson	ACC	35–13 (10–2)	Bill Wilhelm	2 (last: 1959)	5th (1958, 1959)	2–4
Eastern Michigan	MAC	43–14 (12–3)	Ron Oestrike	1 (last: 1975)	6th (1975)	1–2
Maine	Eastern Collegiate (Yankee)	27–7 (6–2)	John Winkin	1 (last: 1964)	3rd (1964)	3–2
Oklahoma	Big 8	62–17 (4–1)	Enos Semore	5 (last: 1975)	1st (1951)	9–8
Washington State	Pac-8	42–13 (16–2)	Chuck Brayton	3 (last: 1965)	2nd (1950)	5–6

=== Results ===
==== Bracket ====
Upper round 1
Clemson	9
Auburn	4
Eastern Michigan	3
Maine	2
Arizona State	7^{10}
Arizona	6
Washington State	6
Oklahoma	1

Upper round 2
Clemson	2
Eastern Michigan	3^{10}
Arizona State	9
Washington State	3
Lower round 1
Auburn	8
Maine	9
Arizona	10
Oklahoma	2

Upper final
Eastern Michigan	2
Arizona State	1
Lower round 2
Washington State	3
Maine	6
Clemson	6
Arizona	10

Semifinals
Eastern Michigan	6
Arizona	11
Arizona State	7
Maine	0

Preliminary final
Arizona	5
Arizona State	1

Final
Eastern Michigan	1
Arizona	7

==== Game results ====
Date	Game	Winner	Score	Loser	Notes
June 11	Game 1	Clemson	9–4	Auburn	
June 11	Game 2	Eastern Michigan	3–2	Maine	
June 12	Game 3	Arizona State	7–6 (10 innings)	Arizona	
June 12	Game 4	Washington State	6–1	Oklahoma	
June 12	Game 5	Maine	9–8	Auburn	Auburn eliminated
June 13	Game 6	Arizona	10–2	Oklahoma	Oklahoma eliminated
June 13	Game 7	Eastern Michigan	3–2 (10 innings)	Clemson	
June 13	Game 8	Arizona State	9–3	Washington State	
June 14	Game 9	Arizona	10–6	Clemson	Clemson eliminated
June 14	Game 10	Maine	6–3	Washington State	Washington State eliminated
June 15	Game 11	Eastern Michigan	2–1	Arizona State	
June 16	Game 12	Arizona State	7–0	Maine	Maine eliminated
June 16	Game 13	Arizona	11–6	Eastern Michigan	
June 18	Game 14	Arizona	5–1	Arizona State	Arizona State eliminated
June 19	Final	Arizona	7–1	Eastern Michigan	Arizona wins CWS

=== All-Tournament Team ===
The following players were members of the All-Tournament Team.

Position	Player	School
P	Bob Chaulk	Arizona
P	Bob Owchinko	Eastern Michigan
C	Ron Hassey	Arizona
1B	Ken Phelps	Arizona State
2B	Dan Schmitz	Eastern Michigan
3B	Brian Petroff	Eastern Michigan
SS	Russ Quetti	Maine
OF	Ken Landreaux	Arizona State
OF	Dave Stegman	Arizona
OF	Pete Van Horne	Arizona
DH	Steve Powers (MOP)	Arizona

=== Notable players ===
- Arizona: Ron Hassey, Dave Stegman
- Arizona State: Gary Allenson, Chris Bando, Floyd Bannister, Mike Colbern, Bob Horner, Dave Hudgens, Darrell Jackson, Ken Landreaux, Chris Nyman, Bob Pate, Rick Peters, Ken Phelps, Gary Rajsich
- Auburn: Joe Beckwith, Terry Leach
- Clemson: Ron Musselman, Chuck Porter, Kurt Seibert
- Eastern Michigan: Glenn Gulliver, John Martin, Bob Owchinko, Bob Welch
- Maine: Jack Leggett, Bert Roberge
- Oklahoma: Terry Bogener, Keith Drumright, George Frazier, Gene Krug, Roger LaFrancois
- Washington State: Dave Edler, Eric Wilkins, Tom Niedenfuer

== Tournament Notes ==
- The Arizona State team featured 13 future Major League players – a record matched by the school's team from the previous year.
- Arizona head coach Jerry Kindall became the first person to win a College World Series as both a player (1956, Minnesota) and a coach.
- Keith Drumright appeared in his fourth College World Series.
- Eastern Michigan was the last northern school to play in the final game of the College World Series for 43 years, until Michigan in 2019.

== See also ==
- 1976 NCAA Division II baseball tournament
- 1976 NCAA Division III baseball tournament (inaugural edition)
- 1976 NAIA World Series
