= 1976 Arizona Wildcats baseball team =

American college baseball season

1976 Arizona Wildcats baseball

College World Series Champions vs. Eastern Michigan

Midwest Regional Champions Western Athletic Conference Playoff Champions
- Conference: Western Athletic Conference
- CB: No. 1
- Record: 56–17 (12–6 WAC)
- Head coach: Jerry Kindall (4th season)
- Assistant coach: Jim Wing (4th season)
- Home stadium: Wildcat Field

1976 Western Athletic Conference baseball standings
	Conf.				Overall
Team	W		L	PCT	W		L	PCT
Northern
BYU ^{x}‍‍‍	15	–	3	.833	26	–	21	.553
Wyoming ‍‍‍	10	–	7	.588	22	–	29	.431
Utah ‍‍‍	8	–	9	.471	15	–	26	.366
Colorado State ‍‍‍	2	–	16	.111	18	–	26	.409
Southern
No. 3 Arizona State ^{x}‍‍‍^{y}	17	–	1	.944	65	–	10	.867
No. 1 Arizona ‍‍‍^{y}	12	–	6	.667	56	–	17	.767
New Mexico ‍‍‍	4	–	14	.222	28	–	24	.538
UTEP ‍‍‍	3	–	15	.167	9	–	25	.265
x – Division champion y – Invited to the NCAA tournament As of June 30, 1976; Rankings from Collegiate Baseball

The 1976 Arizona Wildcats baseball team represented the University of Arizona in the 1976 NCAA Division I baseball season. The team was coached by Jerry Kindall in his 4th season at Arizona. The Wildcats finished with a record of 56–17 overall and placed 2nd in the Western Athletic Conference's Southern Division with a 12-4 in conference play, finishing 2nd in the WAC Southern. Arizona advanced to the postseason for the 3rd straight season and was placed in the Midwest Regional hosted by the University of Texas-Pan American at Jody Ramsey Memorial Stadium in Edinburg, Texas. The Wildcats defeated Texas-Pan American, Missouri and Texas A&M to advance to the College World Series for the 1st time since 1970 (and 10th overall). After losing their 1st game in Omaha, Nebraska to rival Arizona State, Arizona won the next 4 against Oklahoma, Clemson, Eastern Michigan and Arizona State to advance to the final game: a rematch against Eastern Michigan. The Wildcats defeated Eastern Michigan 7–1 to win their 1st National Championship in program history.

== Previous season ==
The Wildcats finished the 1975 season with a record of 41–13–1 and 14-4 in conference play, finishing 2nd in the WAC Southern. Arizona made the postseason for the 2nd straight season and was placed in the West Regional hosted by the University of Southern California at Dedeaux Field in Los Angeles, California. The Wildcats lost back-to-back games to Pepperdine and USC to end their season.

== Personnel ==
=== Roster ===
1976 Arizona Wildcats baseball roster

Pitchers

• Robert Chaulk

• David Crutcher

• Bruce Ferguson

• Craig Giola

• Steve Powers

• Chuck Zopfi

 Richard Stagg

Infielders

• Al Lopez

• Les Pearsey

• Bill Simpson

• Pete Van Horne

• Glenn Wendt

Outfielders

• Ken Bolek

• Robin Carlsen

• Dave Stegman

• Don Zimmerman

Catchers

• Ron Hassey

• Bob Woodside

 Ken Harcus 

=== Coaches ===
1976 Arizona Wildcats baseball coaching staff
- Jerry Kindall - Head coach
- Jim Wing - Assistant coach

== 1976 Schedule and results ==
1976 Arizona Wildcats baseball game log
Regular season
Date	Opponent	Site/Stadium	Score	Overall Record	WAC Record
Feb 13	Pepperdine	Wildcat Field • Tucson, AZ	W 13-2	1-0	
Feb 14	Pepperdine	Wildcat Field • Tucson, AZ	W 8-0	2-0	
Feb 14	Pepperdine	Wildcat Field • Tucson, AZ	W 15-3	3-0	
Feb 16	Cal State Dominguez Hills	Wildcat Field • Tucson, AZ	W 17-10	4-0	
Feb 17	Cal State Dominguez Hills	Wildcat Field • Tucson, AZ	W 11-6	5-0	
Feb 20	Azusa Pacific	Wildcat Field • Tucson, AZ	L 3-5	5-1	
Feb 21	Azusa Pacific	Wildcat Field • Tucson, AZ	W 9-0	6-1	
Feb 21	Azusa Pacific	Wildcat Field • Tucson, AZ	W 10-0	7-1	
Feb 23	Cal Poly Pomona	Wildcat Field • Tucson, AZ	W 4-3	8-1	
Feb 24	Cal Poly Pomona	Wildcat Field • Tucson, AZ	W 12-7	9-1	
Feb 25	Cal Poly Pomona	Wildcat Field • Tucson, AZ	W 11-7	10-1	
Feb 26	San Diego State	Wildcat Field • Tucson, AZ	L 6-7	10-2	
Feb 27	San Diego State	Wildcat Field • Tucson, AZ	W 11-5	11-2	
Feb 28	San Diego State	Wildcat Field • Tucson, AZ	W 5-3	12-2	
Feb 28	San Diego State	Wildcat Field • Tucson, AZ	W 14-13	13-2	
Mar 1	at Grand Canyon	Brazell Field • Phoenix, AZ	L 6-7	13-3	
Mar 2	Grand Canyon	Wildcat Field • Tucson, AZ	W 15-0	14-3	
Mar 5	La Verne	Wildcat Field • Tucson, AZ	W 8-5	15-3	
Mar 6	La Verne	Wildcat Field • Tucson, AZ	W 9-6	16-3	
Mar 8	Oklahoma	Wildcat Field • Tucson, AZ	W 7-1	17-3	
Mar 8	Oklahoma	Wildcat Field • Tucson, AZ	W 6-3	18-3	
Mar 9	Oklahoma	Wildcat Field • Tucson, AZ	W 14-1	19-3	
Mar 9	Oklahoma	Wildcat Field • Tucson, AZ	W 9-8	20-3	
Mar 11	at San Diego State	Smith Field • San Diego, CA	W 7-1	21-3	
Mar 12	at San Diego State	Smith Field • San Diego, CA	L 1-5	21-4	
Mar 13	at San Diego State	Smith Field • San Diego, CA	L 4-6	21-5	
Mar 13	at San Diego State	Smith Field • San Diego, CA	W 6-4	22-5	
Mar 15	at Pepperdine	Waves Park • Malibu, CA	L 3-4	22-6	
Mar 15	at UCLA	Sawtelle Field • Los Angeles, CA	L 0-5	22-7	
Mar 16	at Pepperdine	Waves Park • Malibu, CA	W 1-0	23-7	
Mar 17	at USC	Dedeaux Field • Los Angeles, CA	L 3-4	23-8	
Mar 18	at USC	Dedeaux Field • Los Angeles, CA	L 4-6	23-9	
Mar 19	at La Verne	Galvin Park • Ontario, CA	W 10-5	24-9	
Mar 20	at La Verne	La Verne Field • La Verne, CA	L 6-10	24-10	
Mar 20	at La Verne	La Verne Field • La Verne, CA	W 4-3	25-10	
Mar 23	Colorado	Wildcat Field • Tucson, AZ	W 17-2	26-10	
Mar 25	USC	Wildcat Field • Tucson, AZ	W 8-0	27-10	
Mar 26	USC	Wildcat Field • Tucson, AZ	W 8-5	28-10	
Mar 27	USC	Wildcat Field • Tucson, AZ	W 8-4	29-10	
Apr 1	Northern Arizona	Wildcat Field • Tucson, AZ	W 14-6	30-10	
Apr 2	Northern Arizona	Wildcat Field • Tucson, AZ	W 9-3	31-10	
Apr 3	Northern Arizona	Wildcat Field • Tucson, AZ	W 6-0	32-10	
Apr 8	at Arizona State	Packard Stadium • Tempe, AZ	L 2-7	32-11	0-1
Apr 9	at Arizona State	Packard Stadium • Tempe, AZ	L 9-11	32-12	0-2
Apr 10	at Arizona State	Packard Stadium • Tempe, AZ	L 5-6	32-13	0-3
Apr 17	UTEP	Wildcat Field • Tucson, AZ	W 15-3	33-13	1-3
Apr 17	UTEP	Wildcat Field • Tucson, AZ	W 8-1	34-13	2-3
Apr 18	UTEP	Wildcat Field • Tucson, AZ	W 12-1	35-13	3-3
Apr 23	New Mexico	Wildcat Field • Tucson, AZ	W 5-3	36-13	4-3
Apr 24	New Mexico	Wildcat Field • Tucson, AZ	W 8-6	37-13	5-3
Apr 24	New Mexico	Wildcat Field • Tucson, AZ	W 8-3	38-13	6-3
Apr 30	at UTEP	Dudley Field • El Paso, TX	W 16-0	39-13	7-3
May 1	at UTEP	Dudley Field • El Paso, TX	W 3-1	40-13	8-3
May 1	at UTEP	Dudley Field • El Paso, TX	W 10-3	41-13	9-3
May 7	at New Mexico	Lobo Field • Albuquerque, NM	W 6-3	42-13	10-3
May 8	at New Mexico	Lobo Field • Albuquerque, NM	W 6-3	43-13	11-3
May 9	at New Mexico	Lobo Field • Albuquerque, NM	W 10-4	44-13	12-3
May 13	Arizona State	Wildcat Field • Tucson, AZ	L 1-2	44-14	12-4
May 14	Arizona State	Wildcat Field • Tucson, AZ	L 4-9	44-15	12-5
May 15	Arizona State	Wildcat Field • Tucson, AZ	L 9-14	44-16	12-6
WAC Playoffs
May 21	Wyoming	Wildcat Field • Tucson, AZ	W 19-0	45-16	
May 22	Wyoming	Wildcat Field • Tucson, AZ	W 6-2	46-16	
May 24	BYU	Wildcat Field • Tucson, AZ	W 7-6	47-16	
May 25	BYU	Wildcat Field • Tucson, AZ	W 4-0	48-16	
NCAA Midwest Regional
May 28	at Texas-Pan American	Jody Ramsey Memorial Stadium • Edinburg, TX	W 5-0	49-16	
May 29	vs Missouri	Jody Ramsey Memorial Stadium • Edinburg, TX	W 10-1	50-16	
May 30	vs Texas A&M	Jody Ramsey Memorial Stadium • Edinburg, TX	W 8-2	51-16	
College World Series
Jun 12	vs Arizona State	Johnny Rosenblatt Stadium • Omaha, NE	L 6-7	51-17	
Jun 13	vs Oklahoma	Johnny Rosenblatt Stadium • Omaha, NE	W 10-2	52-17	
Jun 14	vs Clemson	Johnny Rosenblatt Stadium • Omaha, NE	W 10-6	53-17	
Jun 16	vs Eastern Michigan	Johnny Rosenblatt Stadium • Omaha, NE	W 11-6	54-17	
Jun 17	vs Arizona State	Johnny Rosenblatt Stadium • Omaha, NE	W 5-1	55-17	
Jun 18	vs Eastern Michigan	Johnny Rosenblatt Stadium • Omaha, NE	W 7-1	56-17	

=== Midwest Regional ===
Midwest Regional Teams
Texas-Pan American Broncs	Arizona Wildcats	Missouri Tigers	Texas A&M Aggies

== College World Series ==
1976 College World Series Teams
Arizona Wildcats	Arizona State Sun Devils	Auburn Tigers	Clemson Tigers	Eastern Michigan Hurons	Maine Black Bears	Oklahoma Sooners	Washington State Cougars

Upper round 1
Clemson	9
Auburn	4
Eastern Michigan	3
Maine	2
Arizona State	7^{10}
Arizona	6
Washington State	6
Oklahoma	1

Upper round 2
Clemson	2
Eastern Michigan	3^{10}
Arizona State	9
Washington State	3
Lower round 1
Auburn	8
Maine	9
Arizona	10
Oklahoma	2

Upper final
Eastern Michigan	2
Arizona State	1
Lower round 2
Washington State	3
Maine	6
Clemson	6
Arizona	10

Semifinals
Eastern Michigan	6
Arizona	11
Arizona State	7
Maine	0

Preliminary final
Arizona	5
Arizona State	1

Final
Eastern Michigan	1
Arizona	7

== Awards and honors ==
Bob Chaulk

- College World Series All-Tournament Team

Craig Giola

- First Team All-WAC South

Ron Hassey

- College World Series All-Tournament Team
- First Team All-WAC South

Steve Powers

- College World Series Most Outstanding Player

Dave Stegman

- First Team All-American
- College World Series All-Tournament Team
- First Team All-WAC South

Pete Van Horne

- College World Series All-Tournament Team

Glenn Wendt

- First Team All-WAC South

== 1976 MLB draft ==
Player	Position	Round	Overall	MLB team
Ron Hassey	C	18	422	Cleveland Indians
William Simpson	INF	20	471	St. Louis Cardinals
Ken Bolek	OF	24	550	Detroit Tigers
Bruce Ferguson	RHP	31	660	California Angels
