= 1976 Clemson Tigers baseball team =

American college baseball season

1976 Clemson Tigers baseball

ACC champions Atlantic Regional champions

College World Series, 1–2
- Conference: Atlantic Coast Conference
- CB: No. 5
- Record: 36–15 (10–2 ACC)
- Head coach: Bill Wilhelm
- Home stadium: Beautiful Tiger Field

1976 Atlantic Coast Conference baseball standings
	Conf.				Overall
Team	W		L	PCT	W		L	PCT
No. 5 Clemson ‍†‍‡‍^{y}	10	–	2	.833	36	–	15	.706
Maryland ‍‍‍	8	–	4	.667	19	–	14	.576
North Carolina ‍‍‍	8	–	4	.667	19	–	17	.528
NC State ‍‍‍	6	–	6	.500	20	–	10	.667
Wake Forest ‍‍‍	5	–	7	.417	22	–	11	.667
Virginia ‍‍‍	4	–	8	.333	17	–	22	.436
Duke ‍‍‍	1	–	11	.083	7	–	23	.233
† – Conference champion ‡ – Tournament champion y – Invited to the NCAA tournament As of June 30, 1976; Rankings from Collegiate Baseball

The 1976 Clemson Tigers baseball team represented Clemson University in the 1976 NCAA Division I baseball season. The team played their home games at Beautiful Tiger Field in Clemson, South Carolina.

The team was coached by Bill Wilhelm, who completed his nineteenth season at Clemson. The Tigers reached the 1976 College World Series, their third appearance in Omaha.

== Roster ==
1976 Clemson Tigers roster
Pitchers: - Bob Mahony; - Houston Matthews; - Ron Musselman; - Chuck Porter; - Tommy Qualters; - Randy Quintrell; - Steve Wyatt	Catchers: - Bill Foley; Infielders: - Robert Bonnette; - Steve Nilsson; - Kurt Seibert; - Billy Wingo; Outfielders: - Greg Belk; - Dave Caldwell; - Steve Tucker	Unknown: - Gary Fahrney; - Alan Hoover; - Pete Khoury; - Mark McDaniel

== Schedule ==
Legend
	Clemson win
	Clemson loss
**Bold**	Clemson team member
*	Non-Conference game

1976 Clemson Tigers baseball game log
Regular season

March
Date	Opponent	Site/stadium	Score	Overall record	ACC record
March 1	High Point*	Beautiful Tiger Field • Clemson, SC	**W** 3–0	1–0	
March 2	High Point*	Beautiful Tiger Field • Clemson, SC	**W** 4–3^{11}	2–0	
March 3	Francis Marion*	Beautiful Tiger Field • Clemson, SC	**W** 9–0	3–0	
March 5	Baptist*	Beautiful Tiger Field • Clemson, SC	**W** 6–2	4–0	
March 7	James Madison*	Beautiful Tiger Field • Clemson, SC	**W** 5–4	5–0	
March 8	at Georgia*	Foley Field • Athens, GA	**L** 3–4	5–1	
March 10	at Erskine*	Due West, SC	**W** 9–5	6–1	
March 11	Maryland	Beautiful Tiger Field • Clemson, SC	**W** 6–0	7–1	1–0
March 13	at Florida*	Perry Field • Gainesville, FL	**W** 6–5	8–1	
March 14	at Florida*	Perry Field • Gainesville, FL	**L** 4–5	8–2	
March 15	at Rollins*	Alfond Stadium • Winter Park, FL	**L** 7–6	8–3	
March 15	at Stetson*	Conrad Park • DeLand, FL	**L** 1–3^{10}	8–4	
March 16	at Rollins*	Alfond Stadium • Winter Park, FL	**W** 7–6	9–4	
March 17	at Florida Southern*	Henley Field • Lakeland, FL	**W** 11–3	10–4	
March 18	at Florida Southern*	Henley Field • Lakeland, FL	**L** 1–2	10–5	
March 19	at Jacksonville*	John Sessions Stadium • Jacksonville, FL	**L** 2–16	10–6	
March 20	at Georgia Southern*	J. I. Clements Stadium • Statesboro, GA	**L** 8–15	10–7	
March 20	at Georgia Southern*	J. I. Clements Stadium • Statesboro, GA	**W** 16–12	11–7	
March 22	Toledo*	Beautiful Tiger Field • Clemson, SC	**L** 1–3^{14}	11–8	
March 23	Toledo*	Beautiful Tiger Field • Clemson, SC	**L** 1–4	11–9	
March 24	Toledo*	Beautiful Tiger Field • Clemson, SC	**L** 4–6	11–10	
March 25	at Newberry*	Kirkland Field • Newberry, SC	**W** 4–1	12–10	
March 27	UNC Wilmington*	Beautiful Tiger Field • Clemson, SC	**W** 10–6	13–10	
March 28	UNC Wilmington*	Beautiful Tiger Field • Clemson, SC	**W** 10–2	14–10	
March 31	vs Wake Forest	Columbia, SC	**W** 7–5	15–10	2–0
March 31	vs Wake Forest	Columbia, SC	**W** 4–2	16–10	3–0

April
Date	Opponent	Site/stadium	Score	Overall record	ACC record
April 2	at South Carolina*	Columbia, SC	**W** 10–6	17–10	
April 3	at NC State	Doak Field • Raleigh, NC	**W** 7–4	18–10	4–0
April 4	at NC State	Doak Field • Raleigh, NC	**W** 8–0	19–10	5–0
April 5	at Georgia Tech*	Russ Chandler Stadium • Atlanta, GA	**W** 12–3	20–10	
April 6	Georgia*	Beautiful Tiger Field • Clemson, SC	**W** 5–2	21–10	
April 8	at Duke	Jack Coombs Field • Durham, NC	**W** 20–7	22–10	6–0
April 9	at Duke	Jack Coombs Field • Durham, NC	**L** 1–10	22–11	6–1
April 10	at North Carolina	Emerson Field • Chapel Hill, NC	**L** 2–3^{10}	22–12	6–2
April 11	at North Carolina	Emerson Field • Chapel Hill, NC	**W** 3–2^{12}	23–12	7–2
April 12	at Georgia Tech*	Russ Chandler Stadium • Atlanta, GA	**W** 12–10^{11}	24–12	
April 13	South Carolina*	Beautiful Tiger Field • Clemson, SC	**L** 3–4	24–13	
April 14	at Georgia*	Foley Field • Athens, GA	**W** 10–3	25–13	
April 16	Virginia	Beautiful Tiger Field • Clemson, SC	**W** 9–0	26–13	8–2
April 17	Virginia	Beautiful Tiger Field • Clemson, SC	**W** 9–0 (Note: No-hitter)	27–13	9–2
April 18	Maryland	Beautiful Tiger Field • Clemson, SC	**W** 8–6	28–13	10–2
April 21	at Wofford*	Spartanburg, SC	**W** 13–2	29–13	

Postseason

ACC Tournament
Date	Opponent	Site/stadium	Score	Overall record	ACCT record
April 23	Wake Forest	Beautiful Tiger Field • Clemson, SC	**W** 2–0	30–13	1–0
April 24	Maryland	Beautiful Tiger Field • Clemson, SC	**W** 2–1	31–13	2–0
April 25	Maryland	Beautiful Tiger Field • Clemson, SC	**W** 3–2	32–13	3–0

NCAA Atlantic Regional
Date	Opponent	Site/stadium	Score	Overall record	Regional record
May 21	Furman	Columbia, SC	**W** 13–2	33–13	1–0
May 22	South Carolina	Columbia, SC	**W** 10–4	34–13	2–0
May 24	Furman	Columbia, SC	**W** 6–2	35–13	3–0

NCAA College World Series
Date	Opponent	Site/stadium	Score	Overall record	CWS record
June 11	Auburn	Johnny Rosenblatt Stadium • Omaha, NE	**W** 9–4	36–13	1–0
June 13	Eastern Michigan	Johnny Rosenblatt Stadium • Omaha, NE	**L** 3–2^{10}	36–14	1–1
June 14	Arizona	Johnny Rosenblatt Stadium • Omaha, NE	**L** 10–6	36–15	1–2
