= 1976 Oklahoma Sooners baseball team =

American college baseball season

1976 Oklahoma Sooners baseball

NCAA South Central Regional champions

College World Series, 0–2
- Conference: Big Eight Conference
- Record: 62–19 (15–3 Big Eight)
- Head coach: Enos Semore (9th year)
- Home stadium: Haskell Park

1976 Big Eight Conference baseball standings
	Conf.				Overall
Team	W		L	PCT	W		L	PCT
No. 8 Oklahoma ‍‍‍^{y}	15	–	3	.833	62	–	19	.765
Kansas State ‍‍‍	11	–	10	.524	35	–	19	.648
Kansas ‍‍‍	6	–	6	.500	23	–	14	.622
Nebraska ‍‍‍	4	–	4	.500	21	–	14	.600
No. 30 Missouri ‍‍‡‍^{y}	8	–	9	.471	46	–	22	.676
Iowa State ‍‍‍	3	–	5	.375	29	–	32	.475
Colorado ‍‍‍	2	–	4	.333	34	–	26	.567
Oklahoma State ‍‍‍	5	–	13	.278	24	–	26	.480
† – Conference champion ‡ – Tournament champion y – Invited to the NCAA tournament As of June 30, 1976; Rankings from Collegiate Baseball

The 1976 Oklahoma Sooners baseball team represented the University of Oklahoma in the 1976 NCAA Division I baseball season. The Sooners played their home games at Haskell Park, and played as part of the Big Eight Conference. The team was coached by Enos Semore in his eighth season as head coach at Oklahoma.

The Sooners reached the College World Series, their sixth appearance in Omaha, where they finished tied for 7th place after losing games to Washington State and eventual champion Arizona.

== Personnel ==
=== Roster ===
1976 Oklahoma Sooners roster
Pitchers: 13 - Ted Lair; 16 - Kenneth Palmer; 18 - Marty Kunkler; 19 - Gary Brackeen; 20 - Curtis Voyles; 21 - Alex Kager; 25 - George Frazier; 26 - Mickey Lewis Lashley	Catchers: 22 - Roger LaFrancois; Outfielders: 8 - Wayne G. Pecheck; 9 - Terry Bogener; 17 - Don Morris; 1 - Gary Thweatt	Infielders: 2 - Keith Drumright; 3 - Kelly Ray Snider; 5 - Gregory L. Stitzinger; 6 - Michael J. Cunico; 12 - Tommy Thompson; 23 - Gene Krug

=== Coaches ===
1976 Oklahoma Sooners baseball coaching staff
- - Enos Semore - Head coach - 9th Season
- - Gene Stephenson - Assistant coach - 4th season

== Schedule and results ==
Legend
Oklahoma win
Oklahoma loss

1976 Oklahoma Sooners baseball game log
Regular season

February
Date	Opponent	Site/Stadium	Score	Overall Record	Big 8 Record
Feb 26	at Louisiana Tech*	J. C. Love Field at Pat Patterson Park • Ruston, LA	W 6–4	1–0	
Feb 26	at Louisiana Tech*	J. C. Love Field at Pat Patterson Park • Ruston, LA	W 9–2	2–0	
Feb 27	at LSU–New Orleans*	New Orleans, LA	W 3–0	3–0	
Feb 27	at LSU–New Orleans*	New Orleans, LA	W 4–3	4–0	
Feb 28	at LSU–New Orleans*	New Orleans, LA	W 5–2	5–0	
Feb 28	vs Houston*	Rebel Field • Paradise, NV	L 2–6	5–1	

March
Date	Opponent	Site/Stadium	Score	Overall Record	Big 8 Record
Mar 5	at UNLV*	Rebel Field • Paradise, NV	W 8–6	6–1	
Mar 5	vs BYU*	Rebel Field • Paradise, NV	W 4–2	7–1	
Mar 6	vs BYU*	Rebel Field • Paradise, NV	W 4–2	8–1	
Mar 6	at UNLV*	Rebel Field • Paradise, NV	W 8–3	9–1	
Mar 8	at Arizona*	Wildcat Field • Tucson, AZ	L 1–7	9–2	
Mar 8	at Arizona*	Wildcat Field • Tucson, AZ	L 3–6	9–3	
Mar 9	at Arizona*	Wildcat Field • Tucson, AZ	L 1–14	9–4	
Mar 9	at Arizona*	Wildcat Field • Tucson, AZ	L 8–9	9–5	
Mar 11	vs Wyoming*	Packard Stadium • Tempe, AZ	W 8–5	10–5	
Mar 11	at Arizona State*	Packard Stadium • Tempe, AZ	L 0–4	10–6	
Mar 12	vs Northwest Missouri State*	Packard Stadium • Tempe, AZ	W 15–2	11–6	
Mar 12	at Arizona State*	Packard Stadium • Tempe, AZ	L 3–8	11–7	
Mar 13	vs Wyoming*	Packard Stadium • Tempe, AZ	W 4–3	12–7	
Mar 13	vs Northern Arizona*	Packard Stadium • Tempe, AZ	W 7–4	13–7	
Mar 13	at Arizona State*	Packard Stadium • Tempe, AZ	L 2–5	13–8	
Mar 15	Central State*	Haskell Park • Norman, OK	W 5–4	14–8	
Mar 15	Central State*	Haskell Park • Norman, OK	W 14–4	15–8	
Mar 16	Southeastern Oklahoma State*	Haskell Park • Norman, OK	W 1–0	16–8	
Mar 16	Southeastern Oklahoma State*	Haskell Park • Norman, OK	W 5–1	17–8	
Mar 19	Southeastern Oklahoma State*	Haskell Park • Norman, OK	W 11–1	18–8	
Mar 19	Southeastern Oklahoma State*	Haskell Park • Norman, OK	W 16–6	19–8	
Mar 20	Arizona State*	Haskell Park • Norman, OK	L 5–19	19–9	
Mar 20	Arizona State*	Haskell Park • Norman, OK	L 5–7	19–10	
Mar 22	Central Michigan*	Haskell Park • Norman, OK	W 3–0	20–10	
Mar 22	Central Michigan*	Haskell Park • Norman, OK	W 13–2	21–10	
Mar 23	Texas Tech*	Haskell Park • Norman, OK	W 3–0	22–10	
Mar 23	Texas Tech*	Haskell Park • Norman, OK	W 7–0	23–10	
Mar 26	Southern Illinois*	Haskell Park • Norman, OK	L 7–14	23–11	
Mar 27	Southern Illinois*	Haskell Park • Norman, OK	W 7–6	24–11	
Mar 27	Southern Illinois*	Haskell Park • Norman, OK	W 4–0	25–11	
Mar 27	Southern Illinois*	Haskell Park • Norman, OK	W 7–5	26–11	
Mar 29	Missouri	Haskell Park • Norman, OK	W 6–3	27–11	1–0
Mar 29	Missouri	Haskell Park • Norman, OK	L 2–6	27–12	1–1

April/May
Date	Opponent	Site/Stadium	Score	Overall Record	Big 8 Record
Apr 2	Colorado	Haskell Park • Norman, OK	W 14–2	28–12	2–1
Apr 2	vs Colorado	All Sports Stadium • Oklahoma City, OK	L 0–3	28–13	2–2
Apr 3	Colorado	Haskell Park • Norman, OK	W 15–0	29–13	3–2
Apr 3	Colorado	Haskell Park • Norman, OK	W 11–1	30–13	4–2
Apr 5	Dallas*	Haskell Park • Norman, OK	W 6–1	31–13	
Apr 5	Dallas*	Haskell Park • Norman, OK	W 12–0	32–13	
Apr 6	Iowa State	Haskell Park • Norman, OK	W 6–0	33–13	5–2
Apr 6	Iowa State	Haskell Park • Norman, OK	L 3–4	33–14	5–3
Apr 9	at Oklahoma State	University Park • Stillwater, OK	W 10–0	34–14	6–3
Apr 9	vs Oklahoma State	All Sports Stadium • Oklahoma City, OK	W 5–0	35–14	7–3
Apr 10	at Oklahoma State	University Park • Stillwater, OK	W 7–5	36–14	8–3
Apr 10	at Oklahoma State	University Park • Stillwater, OK	W 5–4	37–14	9–3
Apr 12	Oklahoma Baptist*	Haskell Park • Norman, OK	W 1–0	38–14	
Apr 12	Oklahoma Baptist*	Haskell Park • Norman, OK	W 7–0	39–14	
Apr 13	Texas Wesleyan*	Haskell Park • Norman, OK	W 1–0	40–14	
Apr 13	Texas Wesleyan*	Haskell Park • Norman, OK	W 4–2	41–14	
Apr 16	USC*	Haskell Park • Norman, OK	W 3–2	42–14	
Apr 21	Cameron*	Haskell Park • Norman, OK	W 12–0	43–14	
Apr 21	Cameron*	Haskell Park • Norman, OK	W 13–2	44–14	
Apr 23	Oklahoma State	Haskell Park • Norman, OK	W 13–0	45–14	10–3
Apr 23	vs Oklahoma State	All Sports Stadium • Oklahoma City, OK	W 9–8	46–14	11–3
Apr 24	Oklahoma State	Haskell Park • Norman, OK	W 18–4	47–14	12–3
Apr 24	Oklahoma State	Haskell Park • Norman, OK	W 3–2	48–14	13–3
Apr 26	Oklahoma Christian*	Haskell Park • Norman, OK	W 8–1	49–14	
Apr 26	Oklahoma Christian*	Haskell Park • Norman, OK	W 10–1	50–14	
Apr 27	Kansas State	Haskell Park • Norman, OK	W 13–1	51–14	14–3
Apr 27	vs Kansas State	All Sports Stadium • Oklahoma City, OK	W 6–5	52–14	15–3
Apr 30	Oklahoma City*	Haskell Park • Norman, OK	W 8–5	53–14	
May 1	Oklahoma City*	Haskell Park • Norman, OK	W 12–2	54–14	
May 1	Oklahoma City*	Haskell Park • Norman, OK	W 12–2	55–14	

Postseason

Big Eight Tournament
Date	Opponent	Rank/Seed	Site/Stadium	Score	Overall Record	Big 8T Record
May 8	Missouri	All Sports Stadium • Oklahoma City, OK	L 2–4	55–15	0–1	
May 9	Nebraska	All Sports Stadium • Oklahoma City, OK	W 15–5	56–15	1–1	
May 10	Oklahoma State	All Sports Stadium • Oklahoma City, OK	W 2–1	57–15	2–1	
May 11	Missouri	All Sports Stadium • Oklahoma City, OK	W 8–0	58–15	3–1	
May 12	Iowa State	All Sports Stadium • Oklahoma City, OK	W 9–4	59–15	4–1	
May 14	Missouri	All Sports Stadium • Oklahoma City, OK	L 3–5	59–16	4–2	

NCAA South Central Regional
Date	Opponent	Rank/Seed	Site/Stadium	Score	Overall Record	Reg Record
May 28	Miami (FL)	Arlington, TX	W 11–3	60–16	1–0	
May 29	Texas	Arlington, TX	W 3–2	61–16	2–0	
May 31	Texas	Arlington, TX	L 5–6	61–17	2–1	
May 31	Texas	Arlington, TX	W 4–1	62–17	3–1	

College World Series
Date	Opponent	Site/Stadium	Score	Overall Record	CWS Record
June 12	Washington State	Johnny Rosenblatt Stadium • Omaha, NE	L 1–6	62–18	0–1
June 13	Arizona	Johnny Rosenblatt Stadium • Omaha, NE	L 2–10	62–19	0–2
