= 1976 NCAA Division I baseball season =

Baseball season

- Number of teams: 219

NCAA tournament

College World Series
- Champions: Arizona (1st title)
- Runners-up: Eastern Michigan (2nd CWS Appearance)
- Winning coach: Jerry Kindall (1st title)
- MOP: Steve Powers (Arizona)

Seasons
- ← 1975 1977 →

The 1976 NCAA Division I baseball season, play of college baseball in the United States organized by the National Collegiate Athletic Association (NCAA) began in the spring of 1976. The season progressed through the regular season and concluded with the 1976 College World Series. The College World Series, held for the 30th time in 1976, consisted of one team from each of eight regional competitions and was held in Omaha, Nebraska at Johnny Rosenblatt Stadium as a double-elimination tournament. Arizona claimed the championship for the first time.

== Conference winners ==
This is a partial list of conference champions from the 1976 season. The NCAA sponsored regional competitions to determine the College World Series participants. Seven regionals of four teams and one of six each competed in double-elimination tournaments, with the winners advancing to Omaha. 18 teams earned automatic bids by winning their conference championship while 16 teams earned at-large selections.

Conference	Regular season winner	Conference tournament	Tournament venue • city	Tournament winner
Atlantic Coast Conference	Clemson	1976 Atlantic Coast Conference baseball tournament	Beautiful Tiger Field • Clemson, SC	Clemson
Big Eight Conference	Missouri	1976 Big Eight Conference baseball tournament	All Sports Stadium • Oklahoma City, OK	Missouri
Big Ten Conference	Michigan	No tournament		
EIBL	Columbia	No tournament		
Mid-American Conference	Eastern Michigan	No tournament		
Pacific-8 Conference	North - Washington State; South - UCLA	No tournament		
Southeastern Conference	Auburn	No tournament		
Southern Conference	Furman	No tournament		
Southwest Conference	Texas	No tournament		
Yankee Conference	Connecticut	No tournament		

== Conference standings ==
The following is an incomplete list of conference standings:

1976 Atlantic Coast Conference baseball standings
	Conf.				Overall
Team	W		L	PCT	W		L	PCT
No. 5 Clemson ‍†‍‡‍^{y}	10	–	2	.833	36	–	15	.706
Maryland ‍‍‍	8	–	4	.667	19	–	14	.576
North Carolina ‍‍‍	8	–	4	.667	19	–	17	.528
NC State ‍‍‍	6	–	6	.500	20	–	10	.667
Wake Forest ‍‍‍	5	–	7	.417	22	–	11	.667
Virginia ‍‍‍	4	–	8	.333	17	–	22	.436
Duke ‍‍‍	1	–	11	.083	7	–	23	.233
† – Conference champion ‡ – Tournament champion y – Invited to the NCAA tournament As of June 30, 1976; Rankings from Collegiate Baseball

1976 Big Eight Conference baseball standings
	Conf.				Overall
Team	W		L	PCT	W		L	PCT
No. 8 Oklahoma ‍‍‍^{y}	15	–	3	.833	62	–	19	.765
Kansas State ‍‍‍	11	–	10	.524	35	–	19	.648
Kansas ‍‍‍	6	–	6	.500	23	–	14	.622
Nebraska ‍‍‍	4	–	4	.500	21	–	14	.600
No. 30 Missouri ‍‍‡‍^{y}	8	–	9	.471	46	–	22	.676
Iowa State ‍‍‍	3	–	5	.375	29	–	32	.475
Colorado ‍‍‍	2	–	4	.333	34	–	26	.567
Oklahoma State ‍‍‍	5	–	13	.278	24	–	26	.480
† – Conference champion ‡ – Tournament champion y – Invited to the NCAA tournament As of June 30, 1976; Rankings from Collegiate Baseball

1976 Mid-American Conference baseball standings
	Conf.				Overall
Team	W		L	PCT	W		L	PCT
No. 2 Eastern Michigan ‍†‍‍^{y}	12	–	3	.800	46	–	16	.742
Ohio ‍‍‍	11	–	7	.611	25	–	20	.556
Toledo ‍‍‍	8	–	6	.571	33	–	11	.750
Miami ‍‍‍	10	–	8	.556	40	–	20	.667
Ball State ‍‍‍	9	–	9	.500	34	–	14	.708
Bowling Green ‍‍‍	8	–	8	.500	33	–	20	.623
Western Michigan ‍‍‍	8	–	10	.444	25	–	22	.532
Central Michigan ‍‍‍	7	–	11	.389	29	–	16	.644
Kent State ‍‍‍	6	–	11	.353	14	–	26	.350
Northern Illinois ‍‍‍	4	–	10	.286	15	–	22	.405
† – Conference champion y – Invited to the NCAA tournament As of June 30, 1976; Rankings from Collegiate Baseball

1976 Pacific-8 Conference baseball standings
	Conf.						Overall
Team	W		L		T	PCT	W		L		T	PCT
Northern Division
No. 6 Washington State ^{x}‍‍‍^{y}	16	–	2	–	0	.889	43	–	15	–	0	.741
Oregon State ‍‍‍	12	–	6	–	0	.667	31	–	15	–	0	.674
Oregon ‍‍‍	6	–	12	–	0	.333	20	–	18	–	0	.526
Washington ‍‍‍	2	–	16	–	0	.111	7	–	27	–	0	.206
California Intercollegiate Baseball Association
No. 15 UCLA ^{x}‍‍‍	16	–	8	–	0	.667	35	–	25	–	0	.583
Southern California ‍‍‍	15	–	8	–	1	.646	33	–	36	–	2	.479
Stanford ‍‍‍	14	–	10	–	0	.583	42	–	23	–	0	.646
California ‍‍‍	9	–	14	–	1	.396	33	–	20	–	1	.620
UC Santa Barbara ‍‍‍	5	–	19	–	0	.208	17	–	29	–	0	.370
x – Division champion y – Invited to the NCAA tournament As of June 30, 1976; Rankings from Collegiate Baseball

1976 Southern Conference baseball standings
	Conf.				Overall
Team	W		L	PCT	W		L	PCT
No. 18 Furman ‍†‍‍^{y}	11	–	2	.846	23	–	16	.590
Richmond ‍‍‍	9	–	5	.643	20	–	12	.625
The Citadel ‍‍‍	7	–	4	.636	18	–	9	.667
East Carolina ‍‍‍	7	–	6	.538	22	–	7	.759
William & Mary ‍‍‍	5	–	5	.500	13	–	20	.394
Davidson ‍‍‍	5	–	8	.385	10	–	22	.313
Appalachian State ‍‍‍	4	–	8	.333	24	–	14	.632
VMI ‍‍‍	2	–	12	.143	6	–	23	.207
y – Invited to the NCAA tournament As of June 30, 1976; Rankings from Collegiate Baseball

1976 Western Athletic Conference baseball standings
	Conf.				Overall
Team	W		L	PCT	W		L	PCT
Northern
BYU ^{x}‍‍‍	15	–	3	.833	26	–	21	.553
Wyoming ‍‍‍	10	–	7	.588	22	–	29	.431
Utah ‍‍‍	8	–	9	.471	15	–	26	.366
Colorado State ‍‍‍	2	–	16	.111	18	–	26	.409
Southern
No. 3 Arizona State ^{x}‍‍‍^{y}	17	–	1	.944	65	–	10	.867
No. 1 Arizona ‍‍‍^{y}	12	–	6	.667	56	–	17	.767
New Mexico ‍‍‍	4	–	14	.222	28	–	24	.538
UTEP ‍‍‍	3	–	15	.167	9	–	25	.265
x – Division champion y – Invited to the NCAA tournament As of June 30, 1976; Rankings from Collegiate Baseball

1976 Yankee Conference baseball standings
	Conf.				Overall
Team	W		L	PCT	W		L	PCT
No. 24 Connecticut ‍†‍‍	7	–	1	.875	24	–	7	.774
No. 4 Maine ‍‍‍^{y}	6	–	2	.750	29	–	9	.763
No. 23 UMass ‍‍‍	3	–	5	.375	24	–	13	.649
New Hampshire ‍‍‍	2	–	6	.250	6	–	23	.207
Rhode Island ‍‍‍	2	–	6	.250	9	–	13	.409
† – Conference champion y – Invited to the NCAA tournament As of June 30, 1976; Rankings from Collegiate Baseball

== College World Series ==
The 1976 season marked the thirtieth NCAA baseball tournament, which culminated with the eight team College World Series. The College World Series was held in Omaha, Nebraska. The eight teams played a double-elimination format, with Arizona claiming their first championship with a 7–1 win over Eastern Michigan in the final.

Upper round 1
Clemson	9
Auburn	4
Eastern Michigan	3
Maine	2
Arizona State	7^{10}
Arizona	6
Washington State	6
Oklahoma	1

Upper round 2
Clemson	2
Eastern Michigan	3^{10}
Arizona State	9
Washington State	3
Lower round 1
Auburn	8
Maine	9
Arizona	10
Oklahoma	2

Upper final
Eastern Michigan	2
Arizona State	1
Lower round 2
Washington State	3
Maine	6
Clemson	6
Arizona	10

Semifinals
Eastern Michigan	6
Arizona	11
Arizona State	7
Maine	0

Preliminary final
Arizona	5
Arizona State	1

Final
Eastern Michigan	1
Arizona	7
