= 1976 ACC tournament =

1976 ACC tournament may refer to:

- 1976 ACC men's basketball tournament
- 1976 Atlantic Coast Conference baseball tournament
