= 1976 Arizona State Sun Devils baseball team =

American college baseball season

1976 Arizona State Sun Devils baseball

WAC champions NCAA Rocky Mountain Regional champions

College World Series, 3–2
- Conference: Western Athletic Conference
- Record: 65–10 (17–1 WAC)
- Head coach: Jim Brock (5th year)
- Home stadium: Packard Stadium

1976 Western Athletic Conference baseball standings
	Conf.				Overall
Team	W		L	PCT	W		L	PCT
Northern
BYU ^{x}‍‍‍	15	–	3	.833	26	–	21	.553
Wyoming ‍‍‍	10	–	7	.588	22	–	29	.431
Utah ‍‍‍	8	–	9	.471	15	–	26	.366
Colorado State ‍‍‍	2	–	16	.111	18	–	26	.409
Southern
No. 3 Arizona State ^{x}‍‍‍^{y}	17	–	1	.944	65	–	10	.867
No. 1 Arizona ‍‍‍^{y}	12	–	6	.667	56	–	17	.767
New Mexico ‍‍‍	4	–	14	.222	28	–	24	.538
UTEP ‍‍‍	3	–	15	.167	9	–	25	.265
x – Division champion y – Invited to the NCAA tournament As of June 30, 1976; Rankings from Collegiate Baseball

The 1976 Arizona State Sun Devils baseball team represented Arizona State University in the 1976 NCAA Division I baseball season. The Sun Devils played their home games at Packard Stadium, and played as part of the Western Athletic Conference. The team was coached by Jim Brock in his fifth season as head coach at Arizona State.

The Sun Devils reached the College World Series, their eighth appearance in Omaha, where they finished in third place after winning games against Washington State, Maine, and eventual champion Arizona, and losing a semifinal game against Arizona and another to fourth-place Eastern Michigan.

== Personnel ==
=== Roster ===
1976 Arizona State Sun Devils roster
Pitchers: - Floyd Bannister; - Mitch Dean; - Pat Gillie; - Don Hanna; - Darrell Jackson; - Terry Jacob; - Kurtis Bubier; - Jim Peterson; - Tom Van Der Meersche	Catchers: - Gary Allenson; - Chris Bando; - Frank Lucy; Infielders: - Mike Henderson; - Bob Horner; - Dave Hudgens; - Brandt Humphry; - Chris Nyman; - Ken Phelps; - Ricky Peters; - Clay Westlake	Outfielders: - Mike Colbern; - Ken Landreaux; - Bob Pate; - Gary Rajsich; Unknown: - Dale Eiler; - Larry Eiler; - Mike Hildebrandt; - Steve Michael

=== Coaches ===
1976 Arizona State Sun Devils baseball coaching staff
- Jim Brock - Head coach - 5th year

== Schedule and results ==
Legend
Arizona State win
Arizona State loss

1976 Arizona State Sun Devils baseball game log
Regular season

February
Date	Opponent	Site/stadium	Score	Overall record	WAC record
Feb 13	Cal State Northridge*	Packard Stadium • Tempe, AZ	L 5–7	0–1	
Feb 14	Cal State Northridge*	Packard Stadium • Tempe, AZ	W 10–4	1–1	
Feb 14	Cal State Northridge*	Packard Stadium • Tempe, AZ	W 8–6	2–1	
Feb 18	Cal State Dominguez Hills*	Packard Stadium • Tempe, AZ	W 8–1	3–1	
Feb 19	Cal State Dominguez Hills*	Packard Stadium • Tempe, AZ	W 26–0	4–1	
Feb 21	at UNLV*	Rebel Field • Paradise, NV	W 7–4	5–1	
Feb 22	at UNLV*	Rebel Field • Paradise, NV	W 14–7	6–1	
Feb 27	Cal State Fullerton*	Packard Stadium • Tempe, AZ	W 6–4	7–1	
Feb 28	Cal State Fullerton*	Packard Stadium • Tempe, AZ	W 5–4	8–1	

March
Date	Opponent	Site/stadium	Score	Overall record	WAC record
Mar 1	Chapman*	Packard Stadium • Tempe, AZ	W 11–6	9–1	
Mar 2	Chapman*	Packard Stadium • Tempe, AZ	L 0–7	10–1	
Mar 2	Chapman*	Packard Stadium • Tempe, AZ	W 9–1	11–1	
Mar 5	UC Riverside*	Packard Stadium • Tempe, AZ	W 6–2	12–1	
Mar 6	UC Riverside*	Packard Stadium • Tempe, AZ	L 5–12	12–2	
Mar 6	UC Riverside*	Packard Stadium • Tempe, AZ	W 4–0	13–2	
Mar 8	La Verne*	Packard Stadium • Tempe, AZ	W 12–6	14–2	
Mar 9	La Verne*	Packard Stadium • Tempe, AZ	L 7–10	14–3	
Mar 9	La Verne*	Packard Stadium • Tempe, AZ	W 10–7	15–3	
Mar 11	Oklahoma*	Packard Stadium • Tempe, AZ	W 4–0	16–3	
Mar 11	Wyoming*	Packard Stadium • Tempe, AZ	W 7–3	17–3	
Mar 12	Oklahoma*	Packard Stadium • Tempe, AZ	W 8–3	18–3	
Mar 13	Oklahoma*	Packard Stadium • Tempe, AZ	W 5–2	19–3	
Mar 15	at Texas*	Disch–Falk Field • Austin, TX	L 3–4	19–4	
Mar 15	at Texas*	Disch–Falk Field • Austin, TX	L 2–4	19–5	
Mar 16	at Texas*	Disch–Falk Field • Austin, TX	W 6–0	20–5	
Mar 16	at Texas*	Disch–Falk Field • Austin, TX	W 7–1	21–5	
Mar 18	at Tulsa*	Tulsa, OK	W 14–9	22–5	
Mar 18	at Tulsa*	Tulsa, OK	W 12–5	23–5	
Mar 20	at Oklahoma*	Norman, OK	W 19–5	24–5	
Mar 20	at Oklahoma*	Norman, OK	W 7–5	25–5	
Mar 23	vs Oregon State*	Riverside, CA (Riverside Invitational)	W 11–9	26–5	
Mar 23	vs BYU*	Riverside, CA (Riverside Invitational)	W 4–0	27–5	
Mar 24	vs Tulsa*	Riverside, CA (Riverside Invitational)	W 7–3	28–5	
Mar 25	vs Delaware*	Riverside, CA (Riverside Invitational)	W 13–5	29–5	
Mar 26	at UC Riverside*	Riverside, CA (Riverside Invitational)	W 13–2	30–5	
Mar 27	vs Stanford*	Riverside, CA (Riverside Invitational)	W 8–2	31–5	
Mar 28	vs Eastern Michigan*	Riverside, CA (Riverside Invitational)	L 6–7	31–6	
Mar 31	Stanford*	Packard Stadium • Tempe, AZ (Best in the West Tournament)	W 13–0	32–6	

April
Date	Opponent	Site/stadium	Score	Overall record	WAC record
Apr 1	BYU*	Packard Stadium • Tempe, AZ (Best in the West Tournament)	W 8–3	33–6	
Apr 2	Oregon State*	Packard Stadium • Tempe, AZ (Best in the West Tournament)	W 9–8	34–6	
Apr 2	Grand Canyon*	Packard Stadium • Tempe, AZ (Best in the West Tournament)	W 12–4	35–6	
Apr 3	UNLV*	Packard Stadium • Tempe, AZ (Best in the West Tournament)	W 9–8	36–6	
Apr 4	Grand Canyon*	Packard Stadium • Tempe, AZ (Best in the West Tournament)	W 7–3	37–6	
Apr 8	Arizona	Packard Stadium • Tempe, AZ	W 7–2	38–6	1–0
Apr 9	Arizona	Packard Stadium • Tempe, AZ	W 11–9	39–6	2–0
Apr 10	Arizona	Packard Stadium • Tempe, AZ	W 6–5	40–6	3–0
Apr 13	Northern Arizona*	Packard Stadium • Tempe, AZ	W 8–0	41–6	
Apr 16	at New Mexico	Albuquerque, NM	W 9–2	42–6	4–0
Apr 17	at New Mexico	Albuquerque, NM	L 4–6	42–7	4–1
Apr 18	at New Mexico	Albuquerque, NM	W 6–2	43–7	5–1
Apr 23	UTEP	Packard Stadium • Tempe, AZ	W 21–0	44–7	6–1
Apr 24	UTEP	Packard Stadium • Tempe, AZ	W 11–2	45–7	7–1
Apr 24	UTEP	Packard Stadium • Tempe, AZ	W 20–0	46–7	8–1
Apr 27	at Grand Canyon*	Brazell Field • Phoenix, AZ	W 10–1	47–7	
Apr 29	New Mexico	Packard Stadium • Tempe, AZ	W 12–3	48–7	9–1
Apr 30	New Mexico	Packard Stadium • Tempe, AZ	W 11–3	49–7	10–1

May
Date	Opponent	Site/stadium	Score	Overall record	WAC record
May 1	New Mexico	Packard Stadium • Tempe, AZ	W 13–8	50–7	11–1
May 7	at UTEP	El Paso, TX	W 10–5	51–7	12–1
May 8	at UTEP	El Paso, TX	W 9–0	52–7	13–1
May 8	at UTEP	El Paso, TX	W 17–1	53–7	14–1
May 13	at Arizona	Wildcat Field • Tucson, AZ	W 2–1	54–7	15–1
May 14	at Arizona	Wildcat Field • Tucson, AZ	W 9–4	55–7	16–1
May 15	at Arizona	Wildcat Field • Tucson, AZ	W 14–9	56–7	17–1

Postseason

WAC Championship
Date	Opponent	Site/stadium	Score	Overall record	Series record
May 20	BYU	Packard Stadium • Tempe, AZ	W 13–4	57–7	1–0
May 21	BYU	Packard Stadium • Tempe, AZ	W 19–5	58–7	2–0

NCAA Rocky Mountain Regional
Date	Opponent	Site/stadium	Score	Overall record	Reg Record
May 28	Gonzaga	Packard Stadium • Tempe, AZ	W 13–2	60–8	1–0
May 29	Memphis State	Packard Stadium • Tempe, AZ	W 11–4	61–8	2–0
May 30	Minnesota	Packard Stadium • Tempe, AZ	W 12–5	62–8	3–0

College World Series
Date	Opponent	Site/stadium	Score	Overall record	CWS record
June 12	Arizona	Johnny Rosenblatt Stadium • Omaha, NE	W 7–6^{10}	63–8	1–0
June 14	Washington State	Johnny Rosenblatt Stadium • Omaha, NE	W 9–3	64–8	2–0
June 15	Eastern Michigan	Johnny Rosenblatt Stadium • Omaha, NE	L 1–2	64–9	2–1
June 12	Maine	Johnny Rosenblatt Stadium • Omaha, NE	W 7–0	65–9	3–1
June 13	Arizona	Johnny Rosenblatt Stadium • Omaha, NE	L 1–5	65–9	3–2
