= 1976 Eastern Michigan Hurons baseball team =

American college baseball season

1976 Eastern Michigan Hurons baseball
- Conference: Mid-American Conference
- Record: 46-16 (12–3 MAC)
- Head coach: Ron Oestrike (13th season)
- Home stadium: Oestrike Stadium

1976 Mid-American Conference baseball standings
| | Conf. | | | | Overall |
| Team | W | | L | PCT | W | | L | PCT |
|---|---|---|---|---|---|---|---|---|
| No. 2 Eastern Michigan ‍†‍‍^{y} | 12 | – | 3 | .800 | 46 | – | 16 | .742 |
| Ohio ‍‍‍ | 11 | – | 7 | .611 | 25 | – | 20 | .556 |
| Toledo ‍‍‍ | 8 | – | 6 | .571 | 33 | – | 11 | .750 |
| Miami ‍‍‍ | 10 | – | 8 | .556 | 40 | – | 20 | .667 |
| Ball State ‍‍‍ | 9 | – | 9 | .500 | 34 | – | 14 | .708 |
| Bowling Green ‍‍‍ | 8 | – | 8 | .500 | 33 | – | 20 | .623 |
| Western Michigan ‍‍‍ | 8 | – | 10 | .444 | 25 | – | 22 | .532 |
| Central Michigan ‍‍‍ | 7 | – | 11 | .389 | 29 | – | 16 | .644 |
| Kent State ‍‍‍ | 6 | – | 11 | .353 | 14 | – | 26 | .350 |
| Northern Illinois ‍‍‍ | 4 | – | 10 | .286 | 15 | – | 22 | .405 |
† – Conference champion y – Invited to the NCAA tournament As of June 30, 1976; Rankings from Collegiate Baseball

The 1976 Eastern Michigan Hurons baseball team represented Eastern Michigan University in the 1976 NCAA Division I baseball season. The Hurons played their home games at Oestrike Stadium. The team was coached by Ron Oestrike in his 13th season at Eastern Michigan.

The Hurons lost the College World Series, defeated by the Arizona Wildcats in the championship game. No northern school would play for a College World Series title for 43 years, until Michigan in 2019.

== Roster ==
1976 Eastern Michigan Hurons roster
| Pitchers: Bob Owchinko; Bob Welch | Infielders: Glenn Ambrose; Doug Carreri; Glenn Gulliver; Brian Petrof; Danny Schmitz; Catchers: Jerry Keller | Outfielders: Thomas Boutin; Ted Dasen; Mike Lauerman; Bob Vizthum; Coaches: Ron Oestrike - 13th Season |

== Schedule ==
1976 Eastern Michigan Hurons baseball game log
Regular season
March (7–6)

| Date | Opponent | Score | Overall record | MAC record |
|---|---|---|---|---|
| March 19 | at California State | 12–5 | 1–0 | – |
| March 20 | at Loyola Marymount | 6–5 | 2–0 | – |
| March 20 | at Loyola Marymount | 3–4 | 2–1 | – |
| March 22 | at Oregon State | 5–1 | 3–1 | – |
| March 23 | at Stanford | 3–4 | 3–2 | – |
| March 24 | Tulsa | 7–5 | 4–2 | – |
| March 24 | UC Riverside | 2–10 | 4–3 | – |
| March 25 | Delaware | 11–5 | 5–3 | – |
| March 26 | BYU | 0–1 | 5–4 | – |
| March 27 | Arizona State | 7–6 | 6–4 | – |
| March 28 | Chapman | 6–8 | 6–5 | – |
| March 28 | Chapman | 2–3 | 6–6 | – |
| March 29 | California | 6–4 | 7–6 | – |

April (21–3)

| Date | Opponent | Score | Overall record | MAC record |
|---|---|---|---|---|
| April 2 | Albion | 7–1 | 8–6 | – |
| April 2 | Albion | 9–6 | 9–6 | – |
| April 4 | Cincinnati | 4–0 | 10–6 | – |
| April 4 | Cincinnati | 11–0 | 11–6 | – |
| April 6 | Oakland | 7–8 | 11–7 | – |
| April 6 | Oakland | 6–2 | 12–7 | – |
| April 9 | Michigan State | 5–0 | 13–7 | – |
| April 9 | Michigan State | 9–2 | 14–7 | – |
| April 10 | Lewis | 3–4 | 14–8 | – |
| April 10 | Lewis | 8–4 | 15–8 | – |
| April 13 | Detroit | 7–5 | 16–8 | – |
| April 13 | Detroit | 8–2 | 17–8 | – |
| April 16 | Miami (OH) | 8–3 | 18–8 | 1–0 |
| April 16 | Miami (OH) | 5–4 | 19–8 | 2–0 |
| April 17 | Ball State | 17–8 | 20–8 | 3–0 |
| April 17 | Ball State | 8–2 | 21–8 | 4–0 |
| April 23 | Alma | 6–0 | 22–8 | 4–0 |
| April 23 | Alma | 9–2 | 23–8 | 4–0 |
| April 24 | Central Michigan | 3–5 | 23–9 | 4–1 |
| April 24 | Central Michigan | 4–0 | 24–9 | 5–1 |
| April 25 | Michigan | 9–1 | 25–9 | 5–1 |
| April 25 | Michigan | 5–4 | 26–9 | 5–1 |
| April 30 | Ohio | 11–1 | 27–9 | 6–1 |
| April 30 | Ohio | 12–2 | 28–9 | 7–1 |

May (12–4)

| Date | Opponent | Score | Overall record | MAC record |
|---|---|---|---|---|
| May 1 | Kent State | 5–4 | 29–9 | 8–1 |
| May 4 | Michigan State | 12–7 | 30–9 | 8–1 |
| May 4 | Michigan State | 7–6 | 31–9 | 8–1 |
| May 7 | Western Michigan | 0–5 | 31–10 | 8–2 |
| May 7 | Western Michigan | 1–2 | 31–11 | 8–3 |
| May 8 | Northern Illinois | 2–5 | 32–11 | 9–3 |
| May 8 | Northern Illinois | 11–1 | 33–11 | 10–3 |
| May 10 | Wayne State | 5–2 | 34–11 | 10–3 |
| May 10 | Wayne State | 3–9 | 34–12 | 10–3 |
| May 14 | Bowling Green | 5–4 | 35–12 | 11–3 |
| May 14 | Bowling Green | 6–4 | 36–12 | 12–3 |
| May 15 | Detroit | 5–10 | 36–13 | 12–3 |
| May 19 | Michigan | 7–6 | 37–13 | 12–3 |
| May 19 | Michigan | 5–0 | 38–13 | 12–3 |
| May 23 | Detroit | 10–1 | 39–13 | 12–3 |
| May 23 | Detroit | 3–0 | 40–13 | 12–3 |

Postseason
Mid-East Regional (3–1)

| Date | Opponent | Site/stadium | Score | Overall record | MAC record |
|---|---|---|---|---|---|
| May 28 | vs Michigan | Oestrike Stadium | 6–0 | 41–13 | 12–3 |
| May 29 | vs Illinois State | Oestrike Stadium | 3–0 | 42–13 | 12–3 |
| May 30 | vs Michigan | Oestrike Stadium | 3–9 | 42–14 | 12–3 |
| May 30 | vs Michigan | Oestrike Stadium | 6–0 | 43–14 | 12–3 |

1976 College World Series (3–2)

| Date | Opponent | Site/stadium | Score | Overall record | MAC record |
|---|---|---|---|---|---|
| June 11 | vs Maine | Rosenblatt Stadium | 3–2 | 44–14 | 12–3 |
| June 13 | vs Clemson | Rosenblatt Stadium | 3–2 | 45–14 | 12–3 |
| June 15 | vs Arizona State | Rosenblatt Stadium | 2–1 | 46–14 | 12–3 |
| June 16 | vs Arizona | Rosenblatt Stadium | 6–11 | 46–15 | 12–3 |
| June 18 | vs Arizona | Rosenblatt Stadium | 1–7 | 46–16 | 12–3 |

== Awards and honors ==
Dan Schmitz

- All-Tournament Team

Brian Petroff

- All-Tournament Team

Bob Owchinko

- All-Tournament Team

== Hurons in the 1976 MLB draft ==
The following members of the Eastern Michigan Hurons baseball program were drafted in the 1976 Major League Baseball draft.

| Round | Pick | Player | Position | MLB Club |
|---|---|---|---|---|
| 1 | 5 | Bob Owchinko | P | San Diego Padres |
| 4 | 109 | Glenn Gulliver | SS | Detroit Tigers |
| 10 | 219 | Jerry Keller | C | Atlanta Braves |
| 39 | 711 | Thomas Boutin | OF | San Francisco Giants |
