= Charles Keller =

Charles Keller may refer to:

- Charlie Keller (1916–1990), American baseball player
- Charles Keller (military) (1868–1949), United States Army general and businessman
- Charles Reamer Keller (1905–1994), American cartoonist
- Jerry Keller (baseball) (Charles Bricker Keller, born 1955), American baseball player
