= 1976 NCAA Division I baseball rankings =

1976 NCAA Division I baseball season

Tournament

College World Series
- Champions: Arizona
- Runners-up: Eastern Michigan
- MOP: Steve Powers (Arizona)

Seasons
- ← 1975 1977 →

The following poll makes up the 1976 NCAA Division I baseball rankings. Collegiate Baseball Newspaper published its first human poll of the top 20 teams in college baseball in 1957, and expanded to rank the top 30 teams in 1961.

== Collegiate Baseball ==
Currently, only the final poll from the 1976 season is available.

Rank	Team
1	Arizona
2	Eastern Michigan
3	Arizona State
4	Maine
5	Clemson
6	Washington State
7	Auburn
8	Oklahoma
9	Texas
10	Jacksonville
11	Illinois State
12	Miami (FL)
13	Seton Hall
14	Florida State
15	UCLA
16	Temple
17	South Carolina
18	Furman
19	Virginia Tech
20	Michigan
21	Minnesota
22	Memphis
23	Massachusetts
24	Connecticut
25	Northern Colorado
26	Cal State Fullerton
27	Southern Illinois
28	St. John's
29	Texas A&M
30	Missouri
