= 1976 Atlantic Coast Conference baseball tournament =

American college baseball tournament

- Teams: 7
- Format: Seven-team double-elimination tournament
- Finals site: Beautiful Tiger Field; Clemson, South Carolina
- Champions: Clemson (1st title)
- Winning coach: Bill Wilhelm (1st title)
- Attendance: 6,250

1976 Atlantic Coast Conference baseball standings
	Conf.				Overall
Team	W		L	PCT	W		L	PCT
No. 5 Clemson ‍†‍‡‍^{y}	10	–	2	.833	36	–	15	.706
Maryland ‍‍‍	8	–	4	.667	19	–	14	.576
North Carolina ‍‍‍	8	–	4	.667	19	–	17	.528
NC State ‍‍‍	6	–	6	.500	20	–	10	.667
Wake Forest ‍‍‍	5	–	7	.417	22	–	11	.667
Virginia ‍‍‍	4	–	8	.333	17	–	22	.436
Duke ‍‍‍	1	–	11	.083	7	–	23	.233
† – Conference champion ‡ – Tournament champion y – Invited to the NCAA tournament As of June 30, 1976; Rankings from Collegiate Baseball

The 1976 Atlantic Coast Conference baseball tournament was held at Tiger Field in Clemson, South Carolina, from April 22 through 25. Clemson won the tournament and earned the Atlantic Coast Conference's automatic bid to the 1976 NCAA Division I baseball tournament.

== Tournament ==
Play-In Rd. (Single Elim.)	Upper round 2	Upper final	Championship
5	Wake Forest	0
1	Clemson	2
5	Wake Forest	7
4	NC State	3
2	Maryland	2
1	Clemson	3
6	Virginia	8
3	North Carolina	6
6	Virginia	4
2	Maryland	8
7	Duke	9
2	Maryland	10
2	Maryland	2	—
1	Clemson	3	—
Lower round 1	Lower final
2	Maryland	14
6	Virginia	8	6	Virginia	8
5	Wake Forest	2

== See also ==
- College World Series
- NCAA Division I Baseball Championship
