= 1976 Washington State Cougars baseball team =

American college baseball season

1976 Washington State Cougars baseball

Pac-8 Northern Division champion Pac-8 Champion West Regional champion

College World Series, T-5th
- Conference: Pacific-8 Conference
- Northern
- Record: 41–15 (16–2 ND)
- Head coach: Chuck Brayton (14th season)
- Assistant coach: Bob MacDonald (3rd season)
- Home stadium: Bailey Field

1976 Pacific-8 Conference baseball standings
	Conf.						Overall
Team	W		L		T	PCT	W		L		T	PCT
Northern Division
No. 6 Washington State ^{x}‍‍‍^{y}	16	–	2	–	0	.889	43	–	15	–	0	.741
Oregon State ‍‍‍	12	–	6	–	0	.667	31	–	15	–	0	.674
Oregon ‍‍‍	6	–	12	–	0	.333	20	–	18	–	0	.526
Washington ‍‍‍	2	–	16	–	0	.111	7	–	27	–	0	.206
California Intercollegiate Baseball Association
No. 15 UCLA ^{x}‍‍‍	16	–	8	–	0	.667	35	–	25	–	0	.583
Southern California ‍‍‍	15	–	8	–	1	.646	33	–	36	–	2	.479
Stanford ‍‍‍	14	–	10	–	0	.583	42	–	23	–	0	.646
California ‍‍‍	9	–	14	–	1	.396	33	–	20	–	1	.620
UC Santa Barbara ‍‍‍	5	–	19	–	0	.208	17	–	29	–	0	.370
x – Division champion y – Invited to the NCAA tournament As of June 30, 1976; Rankings from Collegiate Baseball

The 1976 Washington State Cougars baseball team represented the Washington State University in the 1976 NCAA Division I baseball season.

Led by legendary head coach Chuck Brayton, in his 14th season at Washington State, the Cougars finished the year with an impressive 43–15 overall record. Their 43 victories established a program record at the time and helped propel WSU to its fourth College World Series appearance—and its most recent trip to Omaha.

Washington State captured the West Regional championship to earn its place in the 1976 College World Series. The Cougars' postseason run eventually came to an end with a loss to the Maine Black Bears in Omaha.

The 1976 roster featured outstanding individual talent to go along with the team's success. Six Cougars earned first Team All-Pac-8 North honors.

while four players from the team were selected in the Major League Baseball Draft. Two of those players, Eric Wilkins and Dave Edler, would go on to reach the big Leagues.

The Cougars played their home games at Bailey Field in Pullman, continuing the tradition of excellence established under Brayton, who would become one of the most successful and influential figures in Washington State baseball history.

Five decades after their historic season, the accomplishments of the 1976 Cougars continue to hold a special place in WSU baseball history.

In October 2026, the team was enshrined in the Washington State University Athletic Hall of Fame, recognizing its remarkable season and lasting legacy within the Cougar baseball program.

== Roster ==
1976 Washington State Cougars baseball team
Players
Coaches

#	Pos.	Name	B/T	Height	Weight	Year	Home town
10	INF	Brian Anderson	R/R	5 ft 8 in (1.73 m)	145 lb (66 kg)	Fr	Ephrata, WA
1	LHP	Chris Camp	R/L	5 ft 10 in (1.78 m)	155 lb (70 kg)	Jr	Spokane, WA
20	C	Greg Chandler	R/R	6 ft 2 in (1.88 m)	185 lb (84 kg)	Jr	Everett, WA
24	INF	Dave Edler	R/R	6 ft 0 in (1.83 m)	185 lb (84 kg)	So	Yakima,WA
15	RHP	Tracy Harris	R/R	6 ft 3 in (1.91 m)	200 lb (91 kg)	Jr	Mercer Island, WA
23	RHP	Mike Henley	R/R	6 ft 1 in (1.85 m)	186 lb (84 kg)	So	Spokane, WA
3	INF	Del Sandberg	R/R	6 ft 2 in (1.88 m)	185 lb (84 kg)	Sr	Spokane, WA
	INF	Joe Tom	/	—	—	So	Kaneohe, HI
11	C	Bob Padovan	S/R	6 ft 1 in (1.85 m)	195 lb (88 kg)	So	Sacramento, CA
9	OF	Larry Poffenroth	R/R	5 ft 11 in (1.8 m)	170 lb (77 kg)	Jr	Spokane, WA
	C	Bob Weis	R/R	6 ft 0 in (1.83 m)	180 lb (82 kg)	So	Wenatchee, WA
16	RHP	Dan Johnson	R/R	—	—	So
2	OF	Greg Herrick	L/R	5 ft 11 in (1.8 m)	175 lb (79 kg)	So	Bothell, WA
17	INF	Mike Hultman	L/L	6 ft 5 in (1.96 m)	225 lb (102 kg)	Sr	Richland, WA
6	INF	Marty Maxwell	R/R	6 ft 1 in (1.85 m)	185 lb (84 kg)	Jr	Lethrbridge, AB
5	INF	John Seefried	R/R	5 ft 11 in (1.8 m)	180 lb (82 kg)	Fr	Spokane, WA
18	RHP	Bob Sherwood	R/R	6 ft 3 in (1.91 m)	190 lb (86 kg)	Jr	Pocatello, ID
4	INF	Bill Simpson	R/R	6 ft 0 in (1.83 m)	175 lb (79 kg)	Sr	Portland, OR
8	OF	Tom Jobb	R/R	5 ft 11 in (1.8 m)	170 lb (77 kg)	Jr	Spokane, WA
12	OF	Tim Tveit	R/R	6 ft 2 in (1.88 m)	195 lb (88 kg)	Jr	Centralia, WA
7	INF	Phil Westendorf	R/R	6 ft 7 in (2.01 m)	197 lb (89 kg)	Jr	Tacoma,WA
22	OF	Jim Carrithers	R/R	6 ft 2 in (1.88 m)	190 lb (86 kg)	So	Lynnwood, WA
13	RHP	John Hoffman	R/R	6 ft 5 in (1.96 m)	200 lb (91 kg)	Sr	Lake Stevens,WA
21	RHP	Eric Wilkins	R/R	6 ft 1 in (1.85 m)	185 lb (84 kg)	So	Seattle, WA

Head coach

Chuck Brayton

Assistant coach(es)

Bob MacDonald

Legend

- (C) Team captain
- (S) Suspended
- (I) Ineligible
- Injured
- Current redshirt

Roster
Last update: September 10, 2021

== Schedule ==
1976 Washington State Cougars baseball game log
Regular season
March (12–3)

#	Date	Opponent	Site/stadium	Score	Overall record	Pac8 record
1	March 13	at Lewis–Clark State	Harris Field • Lewiston, Idaho	0–2	0–1	0–0
2	March 13	at Lewis–Clark State	Harris Field • Lewiston, Idaho	0–4	0–2	0–0
3	March 14	vs Idaho	Harris Field • Lewiston, Idaho	2–0	1–2	0–0
4	March 14	vs Idaho	Harris Field • Lewiston, Idaho	4–0	2–2	0–0
5	March 19	vs Western Washington	Harris Field • Lewiston, Idaho	16–0	3–2	0–0
6	March 19	vs Puget Sound	Harris Field • Lewiston, Idaho	4–9	3–3	0–0
7	March 20	vs Boise State	Harris Field • Lewiston, Idaho	9–2	4–3	0–0
8	March 20	vs Gonzaga	Harris Field • Lewiston, Idaho	4–2	5–3	0–0
9	March 21	vs Portland	Harris Field • Lewiston, Idaho	0–0	6–3	0–0
10	March 21	vs Idaho	Harris Field • Lewiston, Idaho	6-4	7–3	0–0
11	March 22	Eastern Oregon	Bailey Field • Pullman, Washington	7–0	8–3	0–0
12	March 22	Eastern Oregon	Bailey Field • Pullman, Washington	10–3	9–3	0–0
13	March 26	at Boise State	Unknown • Boise, Idaho	14–5	10–3	0–0
14	March 27	vs Northwest Nazarene	Unknown • Boise, Idaho	9–1	11–3	0–0
15	March 31	vs Gonzaga	Unknown • Boise, Idaho	12–6	12–3	0–0

April (15–8)

#	Date	Opponent	Site/stadium	Score	Overall record	Pac8 record
16	April 1	at Arizona State	Packard Stadium • Tempe, Arizona	3–13	12–4	0–0
17	April 2	vs Grand Canyon	Packard Stadium • Tempe, Arizona	0–2	12–5	0–0
18	April 2	vs BYU	Packard Stadium • Tempe, Arizona	11-3	13–5	0–0
19	April 4	vs Nevada	Packard Stadium • Tempe, Arizona	5–2	14–5	0–0
20	April 5	vs Oregon State	Packard Stadium • Tempe, Arizona	2–11	14–6	0–0
21	April 6	at BYU	Unknown • Provo, Utah	3–2	15–6	0–0
22	April 7	vs Boise State	Unknown • Provo, Utah	8–4	16–6	0–0
23	April 7	vs Boise State	Unknown • Provo, Utah	3–8	16–7	0–0
24	April 8	at Northwest Nazarene	Unknown • Nampa, Idaho	7–6	17–7	0–0
25	April 10	at Eastern Washington	Unknown • Cheney, Washington	22–2	18–7	0–0
26	April 10	at Eastern Washington	Unknown • Cheney, Washington	13–5	19–7	0–0
27	April 14	at Gonzaga	Unknown • Spokane, Washington	4–5	19–8	0–0
28	April 15	at Idaho	Guy Wicks Field • Moscow, Idaho	19–2	19–8	0–0
29	April 16	Oregon	Bailey Field • Pullman, Washington	4–1	21–8	1–0
30	April 17	Oregon	Bailey Field • Pullman, Washington	5–1	22–8	2–0
31	April 17	Oregon	Bailey Field • Pullman, Washington	8–4	23–8	3–0
32	April 18	Whitworth	Bailey Field • Pullman, Washington	11–0	24–8	3–0
33	April 24	at Oregon State	Coleman Field • Corvallis, Oregon	0–4	24–9	3–1
34	April 24	at Oregon State	Coleman Field • Corvallis, Oregon	1–2	24–10	3–2
35	April 25	at Oregon State	Coleman Field • Corvallis, Oregon	12–2	25–10	4–2
36	April 26	Idaho	Bailey Field • Pullman, Washington	12–1	26–10	4–2
37	April 27	Gonzaga	Bailey Field • Pullman, Washington	1–4	26–11	4–2
38	April 30	at Washington	Graves Field • Seattle, Washington	9–1	27–11	5–2

May (11–1)

#	Date	Opponent	Site/stadium	Score	Overall record	Pac8 record
39	May 1	at Washington	Graves Field • Seattle, Washington	11–5	28–11	6–2
40	May 1	at Washington	Graves Field • Seattle, Washington	9–0	29–11	7–2
41	May 4	Eastern Washington	Bailey Field • Pullman, Washington	5–8	29–12	7–2
42	May 7	Oregon State	Bailey Field • Pullman, Washington	1–0	30–12	8–2
43	May 8	Oregon State	Bailey Field • Pullman, Washington	13–3	31–12	9–2
44	May 8	Oregon State	Bailey Field • Pullman, Washington	3–2	32–12	10–2
45	May 14	at Oregon	Howe Field • Eugene, Oregon	13–8	33–12	11–2
46	May 15	at Oregon	Howe Field • Eugene, Oregon	7–2	34–12	12–2
47	May 15	at Oregon	Howe Field • Eugene, Oregon	10–5	35–12	13–2
48	May 20	Lewis–Clark State	Bailey Field • Pullman, Washington	13–2	36–12	13–2
49	May 21	Washington	Bailey Field • Pullman, Washington	18–3	37–12	14–2
50	May 22	Washington	Bailey Field • Pullman, Washington	13–3	38–12	15–2
51	May 22	Washington	Bailey Field • Pullman, Washington	19–3	39–12	16–2

Postseason
NCAA West Regional (3–1)

#	Date	Opponent	Site/stadium	Score	Overall record	Pac8 record
52	May 28	vs Pepperdine	Bailey Field • Pullman, Washington	8–2	40–12	16–2
53	May 29	vs Cal State Fullerton	Bailey Field • Pullman, Washington	5–1	40–12	16–2
54	June 2	vs Cal State Fullerton	Bailey Field • Pullman, Washington	1–13	41–13	16–2
55	June 2	vs Cal State Fullerton	Bailey Field • Pullman, Washington	7–2	42–13	16–2

College World Series (1–2)

#	Date	Opponent	Site/stadium	Score	Overall record	Pac8 record
56	June 12	vs Oklahoma	Johnny Rosenblatt Stadium • Omaha, Nebraska	6–1	42–13	16–2
57	June 13	vs Arizona State	Johnny Rosenblatt Stadium • Omaha, Nebraska	3–9	43–14	16–2
57	June 14	vs Maine	Johnny Rosenblatt Stadium • Omaha, Nebraska	3–6	44–15	16–2
