= 1976 Auburn Tigers baseball team =

American college baseball season

1976 Auburn Tigers baseball

NCAA South Regional champions

College World Series, 0–2
- Conference: Southeastern Conference
- Western Division
- CB: No. 7
- Record: 37–15 (12–7 SEC)
- Head coach: Paul Nix (14th season)
- Home stadium: Plainsman Park

1976 Southeastern Conference baseball standings
	Conf.				Overall
Team	W		L	PCT	W		L	PCT
Eastern Division
Tennessee ^{x}‍‍‍	15	–	9	.625	33	–	17	.660
Kentucky ^{x}‍‍‍	15	–	9	.625	28	–	18	.609
Vanderbilt ‍‍‍	12	–	12	.500	27	–	23	.540
Florida ‍‍‍	10	–	13	.435	21	–	27	.438
Georgia ‍‍‍	7	–	16	.304	21	–	27	.438
Western Division
No. 7 Auburn ^{x}‍‍‍^{y}	12	–	7	.632	37	–	15	.712
Mississippi State ‍‍‍	11	–	12	.478	28	–	17	.622
LSU ‍‍‍	11	–	12	.478	19	–	23	.452
Alabama ‍‍‍	10	–	11	.476	25	–	18	.581
Ole Miss ‍‍‍	11	–	13	.458	18	–	18	.500
x – Division champion y – Invited to the NCAA tournament As of June 30, 1976; Rankings from Collegiate Baseball

The 1976 Auburn Tigers baseball team represented Auburn University in the 1976 NCAA Division I baseball season. The Tigers played their home games at Plainsman Park. They were led by head coach Paul Nix, in his fourteenth season as head coach of the program.

The Tigers reached the College World Series, where they finished tied for 7th after losing games to Clemson and Maine.

== Personnel ==
=== Roster ===
1976 Auburn Tigers roster
Pitchers: Joe Beckwith; Robert Hudson; Terry Leach; Mark McClanahan; David O'Hare; Kent Skinner; David Sullivan; Mark Wimberly	Catchers: Tommy Morton; John Trageser; Outfielders: Curt Cope	Infielders: J. B. Brown; David Duffner; Dom Fucci; Richie Howard; Mickey Miller

== Schedule and results ==
1976 Auburn Tigers baseball game log
Regular season

February (1–1)
Date	Opponent	Site/stadium	Score	Overall record	SEC record
February 26	Houston*	Plainsman Park • Auburn, AL	W 5–0	1–0	–
February 26	Houston*	Plainsman Park • Auburn, AL	L 0–7	1–1	–

March (17–3)
Date	Opponent	Site/stadium	Score	Overall record	SEC record
March 3	Birmingham–Southern*	Plainsman Park • Auburn, AL	W 4–1	2–1	–
March 3	Troy State*	Plainsman Park • Auburn, AL	W 12–0	3–1	–
March 8	at Alabama	Sewell–Thomas Stadium • Tuscaloosa, AL	W 4–0	4–1	1–0
March 8	at Alabama	Sewell–Thomas Stadium • Tuscaloosa, AL	W 5–2	5–1	2–0
March 9	at Alabama	Sewell–Thomas Stadium • Tuscaloosa, AL	W 11–5	6–1	3–0
March 11	North Alabama*	Plainsman Park • Auburn, AL	W 12–0	7–1	3–0
March 11	North Alabama*	Plainsman Park • Auburn, AL	W 3–1	8–1	3–0
March 17	Notre Dame*	Plainsman Park • Auburn, AL	W 10–2	9–1	3–0
March 17	Notre Dame*	Plainsman Park • Auburn, AL	W 9–0	10–1	3–0
March 18	Notre Dame*	Plainsman Park • Auburn, AL	W 8–6	11–1	3–0
March 19	at Ole Miss	Swayze Field • Oxford, MS	W 3–2	12–1	4–0
March 19	at Ole Miss	Swayze Field • Oxford, MS	W 6–4	13–1	5–0
March 20	at Ole Miss	Swayze Field • Oxford, MS	W 1–0	14–1	6–0
March 22	Ohio*	Plainsman Park • Auburn, AL	W 6–4	15–1	6–0
March 22	Ohio*	Plainsman Park • Auburn, AL	W 7–4	16–1	6–0
March 23	Ohio*	Plainsman Park • Auburn, AL	W 2–1	17–1	6–0
March 23	Ohio*	Plainsman Park • Auburn, AL	L 8–9	17–2	6–0
March 24	Ohio*	Plainsman Park • Auburn, AL	W 6–4	18–2	6–0
March 27	Mississippi State	Plainsman Park • Auburn, AL	L 1–6	18–3	6–1
March 27	Mississippi State	Plainsman Park • Auburn, AL	L 1–3	18–4	6–2

April (9–8)
Date	Opponent	Site/stadium	Score	Overall record	SEC record
April 2	at Georgia*	Foley Field • Athens, GA	W 11–3	19–4	6–2
April 3	at Georgia*	Foley Field • Athens, GA	L 2–3	19–5	6–2
April 5	Jacksonville State*	Plainsman Park • Auburn, AL	W 5–3	20–5	6–2
April 5	Jacksonville State*	Plainsman Park • Auburn, AL	L 6–7	20–6	6–2
April 9	at LSU	Alex Box Stadium • Baton Rouge, LA	L 3–4	20–7	6–3
April 9	at LSU	Alex Box Stadium • Baton Rouge, LA	W 5–2	21–7	7–3
April 10	at LSU	Alex Box Stadium • Baton Rouge, LA	L 1–3	21–8	7–4
April 12	New Orleans*	Plainsman Park • Auburn, AL	W 5–1	22–8	7–4
April 16	Ole Miss	Plainsman Park • Auburn, AL	L 1–3	22–9	7–5
April 16	Ole Miss	Plainsman Park • Auburn, AL	W 5–2	23–9	8–5
April 17	Ole Miss	Plainsman Park • Auburn, AL	L 2–9	23–10	8–6
April 20	at Mercer*	Bear Field • Macon, GA	L 4–10	23–11	8–6
April 20	at Mercer*	Bear Field • Macon, GA	W 6–2	24–11	8–6
April 26	at Mississippi State	Dudy Noble Field • Starkville, MS	W 7–0	25–11	9–6
April 27	at Mississippi State	Dudy Noble Field • Starkville, MS	W 2–1	26–11	10–6
April 27	at Mississippi State	Dudy Noble Field • Starkville, MS	W 3–1	27–11	11–6
April 30	LSU	Plainsman Park • Auburn, AL	L 0–2	27–12	11–7

May (4–0)
Date	Opponent	Site/stadium	Score	Overall record	SEC record
May 1	LSU	Plainsman Park • Auburn, AL	W 5–1	28–12	12–7
May 3	at Birmingham–Southern*	Unknown • Birmingham, AL	W 13–4	29–12	12–7
May 3	Mercer*	Plainsman Park • Auburn, AL	W 9–4	30–12	12–7
May 3	Mercer*	Plainsman Park • Auburn, AL	W 4–3	31–12	12–7

Postseason

SEC Conference Championship (2–1)
Date	Opponent	Site/stadium	Score	Overall record
May 13	at Kentucky	Cliff Hagan Stadium • Lexington, KY	L 6–7	31–13
May 16	Kentucky	Plainsman Park • Auburn, AL	W 6–0	32–13
May 16	Kentucky	Plainsman Park • Auburn, AL	W 14–6	33–13

May (1–0)
Date	Opponent	Site/stadium	Score	Overall record
May 18	Georgia Tech	Plainsman Park • Auburn, AL	W 6–4	34–13

NCAA South Regional (3–0)
Date	Opponent	Site/stadium	Score	Overall record	Reg record
May 21	Middle Tennessee	Seminole Field • Tallahassee, FL	W 10–5	35–13	1–0
May 24	Florida State	Seminole Field • Tallahassee, FL	W 2–1	36–13	2–0
May 25	Jacksonville	Seminole Field • Tallahassee, FL	W 7–5	37–13	3–0

College World Series (0–2)
Date	Opponent	Site/stadium	Score	Overall record	CWS record
June 11	Clemson	Johnny Rosenblatt Stadium • Omaha, NE	L 4–9	37–14	0–1
June 12	Maine	Johnny Rosenblatt Stadium • Omaha, NE	L 8–9	37–15	0–2

- Win
- Loss

== Tigers in the 1976 MLB draft ==
Three members of the Auburn Tigers baseball program were drafted in the 1976 Major League Baseball draft.

Player	Position	Round	Overall	MLB team
Terry Leach	RHP	7th	135	Boston Red Sox
Joe Beckwith	RHP	12th	278	Cleveland Indians
Richie Howard	3B	28th	634	Pittsburgh Pirates
