= 1976 Maine Black Bears baseball team =

1976 Maine Black Bears baseball

ECAC New England baseball tournament champion NCAA Northeast Regional champion

College World Series, 2–2
- Conference: Yankee Conference
- Record: 29–9 (6–2 Yankee)
- Head coach: John Winkin (2nd season)

1976 Yankee Conference baseball standings
	Conf.				Overall
Team	W		L	PCT	W		L	PCT
No. 24 Connecticut ‍†‍‍	7	–	1	.875	24	–	7	.774
No. 4 Maine ‍‍‍^{y}	6	–	2	.750	29	–	9	.763
No. 23 UMass ‍‍‍	3	–	5	.375	24	–	13	.649
New Hampshire ‍‍‍	2	–	6	.250	6	–	23	.207
Rhode Island ‍‍‍	2	–	6	.250	9	–	13	.409
† – Conference champion y – Invited to the NCAA tournament As of June 30, 1976; Rankings from Collegiate Baseball

The 1976 Maine Black Bears baseball team represented the University of Maine in the 1976 NCAA Division I baseball season. The Black Bears were led by John Winkin in his 2nd year as head coach, and played as part of the Yankee Conference.

Maine posted a 29–9 record, finished second in the Yankee Conference with a 6–2 regular season, and won the Eastern Collegiate Athletic Conference New England Tournament to claim the automatic bid to the 1976 NCAA Division I baseball tournament. They swept the Northeast Regional to advance to the 1976 College World Series, their second appearance in Omaha. The Black Bears won games against Auburn and Washington State and lost to eventual runner-up Eastern Michigan and third place Arizona State.

== Personnel ==
=== Roster ===
1976 Maine Black Bears baseball roster
Pitchers: 1 - Bruce Justice - Sophomore; 6 - Fred Fasulo - Freshman; 7 - John Sawyer - Junior; 11 - Bert Roberge - Senior; 22 - Barry LaCasse - Sophomore; 25 - Steve Conley - Senior; 26 - Gary Smart - Freshman	Catchers: 15 - Billy Hughes - Sophomore; 18 - Mark Armstrong - Freshman; Outfielders: 8 - Ed Flaherty - Senior; 10 - Phil Skillings - Sophomore; 17 - Dana Dresser - Junior; 23 - John Dumont - Senior; 24 - Mike Curry - Sophomore	Infielders: 3 - Wayne Fiegenbaum - Sophomore; 9 - Brian Butterfield - Freshman; 12 - Doug Carville - Sophomore; 14 - Russ Quetti - Sophomore; 16 - Peter LaFlamme - Freshman; 19 - Tony DiBiase - Senior; 21 - Jack Leggett - Senior

==== Coaches ====
1976 Maine Black Bears baseball coaching staff
- 5 - John Winkin - Head coach - 2nd season
- 22 - Carl Merrill - Assistant coach - 2nd season

== Schedule ==
1976 Maine Black Bears baseball game log
Regular season

March/April
Date	Opponent	Site/stadium	Score	Overall record	YC record
Mar 28	vs Michigan State*	Mark Light Field • Coral Gables, FL	W 7–1	1–0	
Mar 30	vs Michigan State*	Mark Light Field • Coral Gables, FL	W 14–9	2–0	
Mar 31	vs Michigan State*	Mark Light Field • Coral Gables, FL	L 9–19	2–1	
Apr 1	at Miami (FL)*	Mark Light Field • Coral Gables, FL	L 1–3	2–2	
Apr 2	at Miami (FL)*	Mark Light Field • Coral Gables, FL	L 2–8	2–3	
Apr 3	at Miami (FL)*	Mark Light Field • Coral Gables, FL	L 5–7	2–4	
	at Biscayne*	Miami Gardens, FL	W 10–5	3–4	
	at Providence*	Hendricken Field • Providence, RI	W 5–3	4–4	
	at Providence*	Hendricken Field • Providence, RI	W 8–3	5–4	
Apr 10	at Connecticut	J. O. Christian Field • Storrs, CT	L 0–2	5–5	0–1
Apr 13	at Connecticut	J. O. Christian Field • Storrs, CT	W 1–0	6–5	1–1
	Rhode Island	Orono, ME	W 8–4	7–5	2–1
	Rhode Island	Orono, ME	W 1–0	8–5	3–1
	at Fairfield*	Alumni Baseball Diamond • Fairfield, CT	W 8–6	9–5	
	at Bowdoin*	Pickard Field • Brunswick, ME	W 14–3	10–5	
Apr 24	UMass	Orono, ME	W 6–1	11–5	4–1
Apr 24	UMass	Orono, ME	W 4–3	12–5	5–1
	at Colby*	Coombs Field • Waterville, ME	W 11–2	13–5	
	at Northeastern*	Parsons Field • Brookline, MA	W 4–2	14–5	
	at New Hampshire	Durham, NH	W 7–1	15–5	6–1
	at New Hampshire	Durham, NH	5–6	15–6	6–2
	at Husson*	Bangor, ME	W 10–0	16–6	
	Holy Cross*	Orono, ME	W 10–3	17–6	
	Holy Cross*	Orono, ME	L 1–3	17–7	
	Husson*	Orono, ME	W 27–5	18–7	
	Bates*	Orono, ME	W 4–3	19–7	
	Colby*	Orono, ME	W 4–0	20–7	

Postseason

ECAC New England baseball tournament
Date	Opponent	Site/stadium	Score	Overall record	ECACT record
May 22	Connecticut	Palmer Field • Middletown, CT	W 2–1	21–7	1–0
May 22	UMass	Palmer Field • Middletown, CT	W 4–3	22–7	2–0
May 22	UMass	Palmer Field • Middletown, CT	W 4–1	23–7	3–0

NCAA Northeast Regional
Date	Opponent	Seed	Site/stadium	Score	Overall record	NCAAT record
	(4) Penn State	(3)	Palmer Field • Middletown, CT	W 11–4	24–7	1–0
	(2) Temple	(3)	Palmer Field • Middletown, CT	W 6–3	25–7	2–0
	(1) Seton Hall	(3)	Palmer Field • Middletown, CT	W 3–1	26–7	3–0
	(1) Seton Hall	(3)	Palmer Field • Middletown, CT	W 4–2	27–7	4–0

College World Series
Date	Opponent	Site/stadium	Score	Overall record	CWS record
June 11	Eastern Michigan	Johnny Rosenblatt Stadium • Omaha, NE	L 2–3	27–8	0–1
June 12	Auburn	Johnny Rosenblatt Stadium • Omaha, NE	W 9–8	28–8	1–1
June 14	Washington State	Johnny Rosenblatt Stadium • Omaha, NE	W 6–3	29–8	2–1
June 16	Arizona State	Johnny Rosenblatt Stadium • Omaha, NE	L 0–7	29–9	2–2
