= Brian Shackelford =

American baseball player (born 1976)

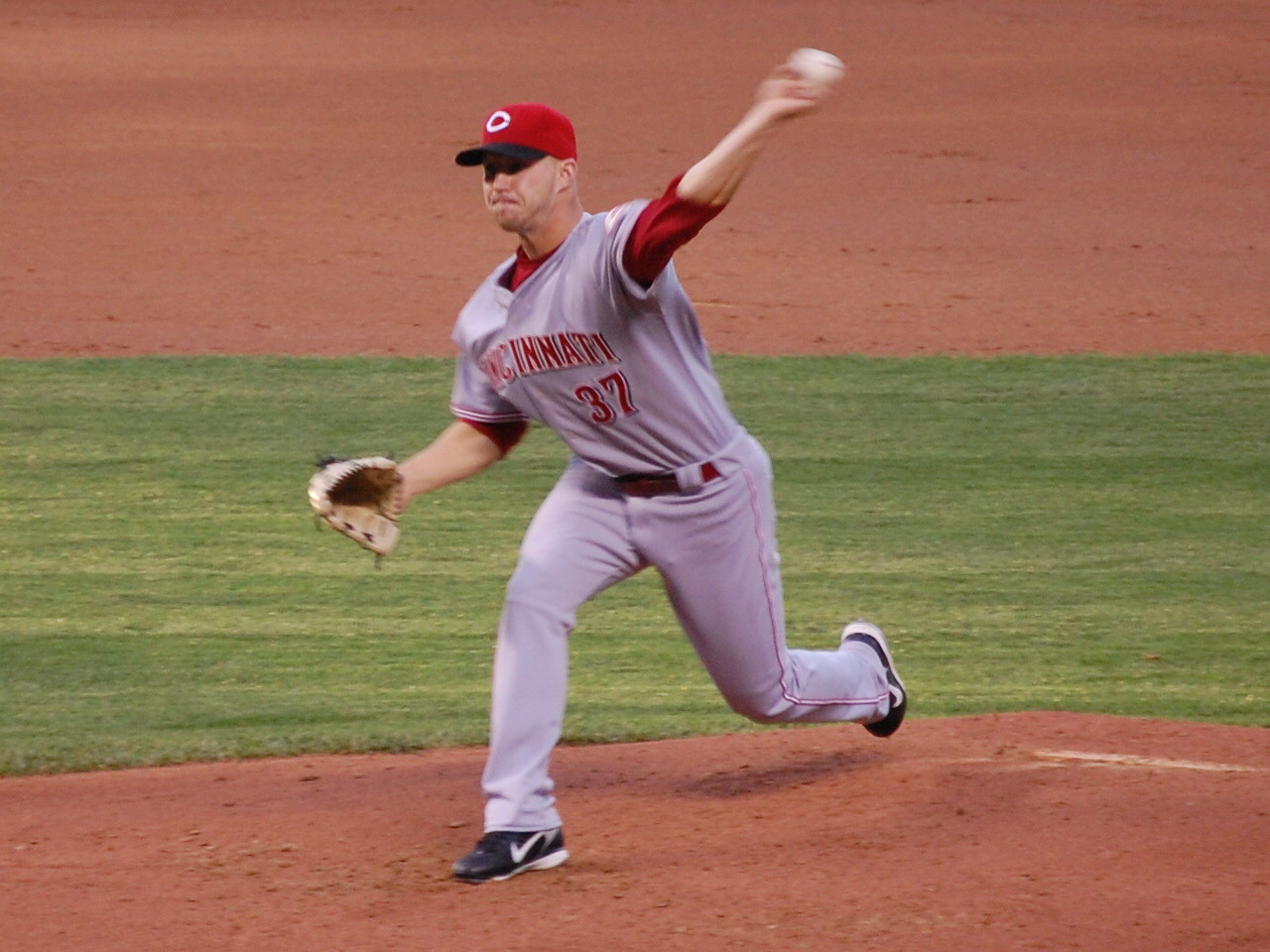
- Pitcher
- Born: August 30, 1976 (age 49); McAlester, Oklahoma, U.S.
- Batted: Left Threw: Left

MLB debut
- June 26, 2005, for the Cincinnati Reds

Last MLB appearance
- September 20, 2006, for the Cincinnati Reds

MLB statistics
- Win–loss record: 2–0
- Earned run average: 4.11
- Strikeouts: 32
- Stats at Baseball Reference

Teams
- Cincinnati Reds (2005–2006)

Brian Wesley Shackelford (born August 30, 1976) is an American former Major League Baseball pitcher. He batted and threw left-handed.

== Career ==
He made his Major League debut for the Cincinnati Reds on June 26, 2005, and had an ERA of 2.30 in that season.

On July 28, 2007, Shackelford was traded by the Reds along with Calvin Medlock to the Tampa Bay Devil Rays for Jorge Cantú and Shaun Cumberland. On December 12, 2007, Shackelford signed a minor league contract with an invitation to spring training with the Los Angeles Dodgers, but was released during spring training.

For the 2008 season, Shackelford signed with the Southern Maryland Blue Crabs of the Atlantic League. After his release on May 22, he signed with the Long Island Ducks on August 8.
