= Doug Kingsmore Stadium =

Baseball park in Clemson, South Carolina

- BTF, DKS, "The Doug"
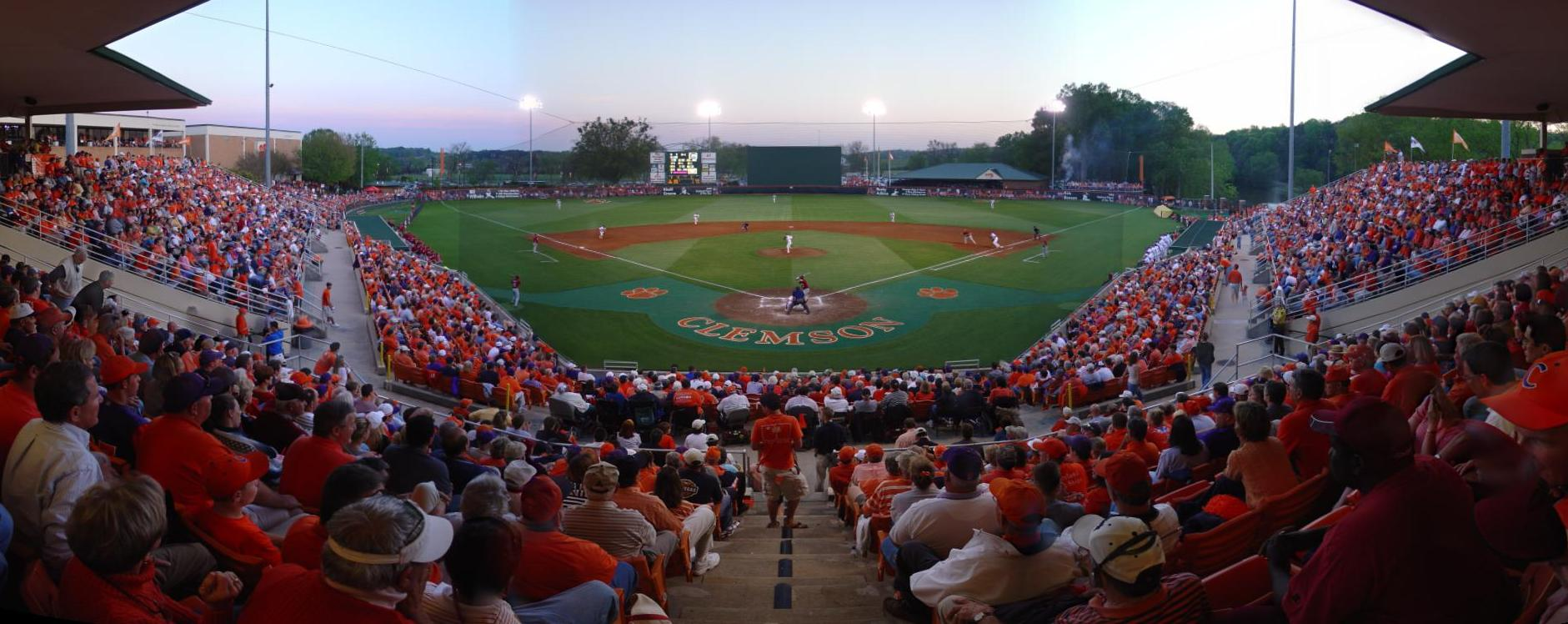
- Clemson vs. South Carolina in 2006
- Interactive map of Doug Kingsmore Stadium
- Former names: Beautiful Tiger Field (1970–2003)
- Location: N. Silas Pearman Blvd. (Perimeter Rd.); Clemson, South Carolina,
- Coordinates: 34.679°N 82.849°W
- Owner: Clemson University
- Operator: Clemson University
- Capacity: 6,272
- Surface: Natural grass
- Record attendance: 6,891 (February 28, 2025)
- Field size: Left Field - 320 ft (98 m); Left-Center - 370 ft (113 m); Center Field - 400 ft (122 m); Right-Center - 375 ft (114 m); Right Field - 330 ft (101 m)

Construction
- Opened: 1970; 56 years ago
- Renovated: 2003, 2008, 2015

Tenants
- Clemson Tigers (NCAA) (1970–present); ACC tournament (1976, 1977, 1978); NCAA Regional: 1994, 1995, 1996, 1998, 2000, 2001, 2002, 2005, 2006, 2009, 2011, 2016, 2017, 2018, 2023, 2024, 2025; NCAA Super Regional: 2000, 2002, 2006, 2010, 2024

Clemson (the United States)
Clemson (South Carolina)

Doug Kingsmore Stadium (known prior to 2003 officially as Beautiful Tiger Field) is a baseball park in the southeastern United States, located in Clemson, South Carolina. It is the home of the Clemson Tigers baseball team.

Opened 56 years ago in 1970, it has a record single-game attendance of 6,891 (set on February 28, 2025 against South Carolina). Doug Kingsmore has ranked in the top 20 in attendance for 15 consecutive seasons. The Tigers have an .809 winning percentage in games played there all time and are 25–2 (.926) in NCAA tournament games there since the NCAA changed its post-season format in 1999 (with a 33–10 (.767) record in NCAA tournament games all time).

The stadium is notable for not having a traditional dirt warning track outlining the boundaries of the field, instead featuring a slight uphill grade leading to the wall in the outfield.

== History ==
=== Renaming ===
Former Clemson baseball player and Board of Trustees Emeritus Doug Kingsmore gave the Clemson athletic department a $1 million gift towards renovation of Clemson's baseball stadium, formerly known as Tiger Field. George Bennett, former executive director of IPTAY, made the announcement in 2000. Bennett also announced that the facility would be called Doug Kingsmore Stadium.

=== Postseason ===
The stadium has hosted three Atlantic Coast Conference baseball tournaments (1976, 1977, 1978), 17 NCAA regionals (1994, 1995, 1996, 1998, 2000, 2001, 2002, 2005, 2006, 2009, 2011, 2016, 2017, 2018, 2023, 2024, 2025), and five NCAA super regionals (2000, 2002, 2006, 2010, 2024).

== Renovations ==
Renovations to Doug Kingsmore Stadium began in the summer of 2002. The design was done by HOK Sport (now Populous) and construction by Yeargin Potter Shackelford Construction. The stadium has a brick facade that surrounds every entrance. A green roof that covers much more of the stands and a press box that is twice as large adds to the comfort of fans attending the game and the media covering it. The press box, which is accessible by elevator, includes four large booths for broadcasting and a separate media center that accommodates 13 writers.

There is also a patio area outside the press box that is above the existing stands along the first and third-base lines. It is used for receptions and other events throughout the year.

Two ticket booths, concession stands with an adjoining picnic area, and enlarged restrooms make the facility easily accessible and fan-friendly. Reserved seats were also added to the grandstand. A grand stairway leading from the McFadden parking lot to the main entrance is an added feature from a convenience and aesthetic aspect.

The players also realize improvements, as four batting cages have been constructed beyond the right-field fence. The dugouts have been almost doubled in length and width. And the players have a newly renovated locker room and lounge.

Prior to 2005, PawVision, the giant replay screen that was used in the football stadium (1997–2004), was moved to Doug Kingsmore Stadium.

The facility is also equipped with a Super Sopper, which cuts down on rainouts. Clemson is one of a few schools with this machine that removes water from the field.

New Stadium Features:

- Ornamental metal fence
- Plaza area
- Brick façade
- Overhanging roof
- Enlarged & temperature-controlled press box
- Patio areas above the stands
- Ticket booths
- Enlarged concession stands
- Enlarged restrooms
- Chair-back seats
- Left-field grandstand
- Grand stairway entrance with Hall of Fame area
- Indoor batting cages
- Enlarged dugouts
- V.I.P. parking lot and drop-off
- "PawVision" giant replay screen

The diamond has an unorthodox southerly alignment (home plate to center field); the recommended orientation is east-northeast. The elevation of the field is approximately 600 feet (185 m) above sea level.

== Attendance ==
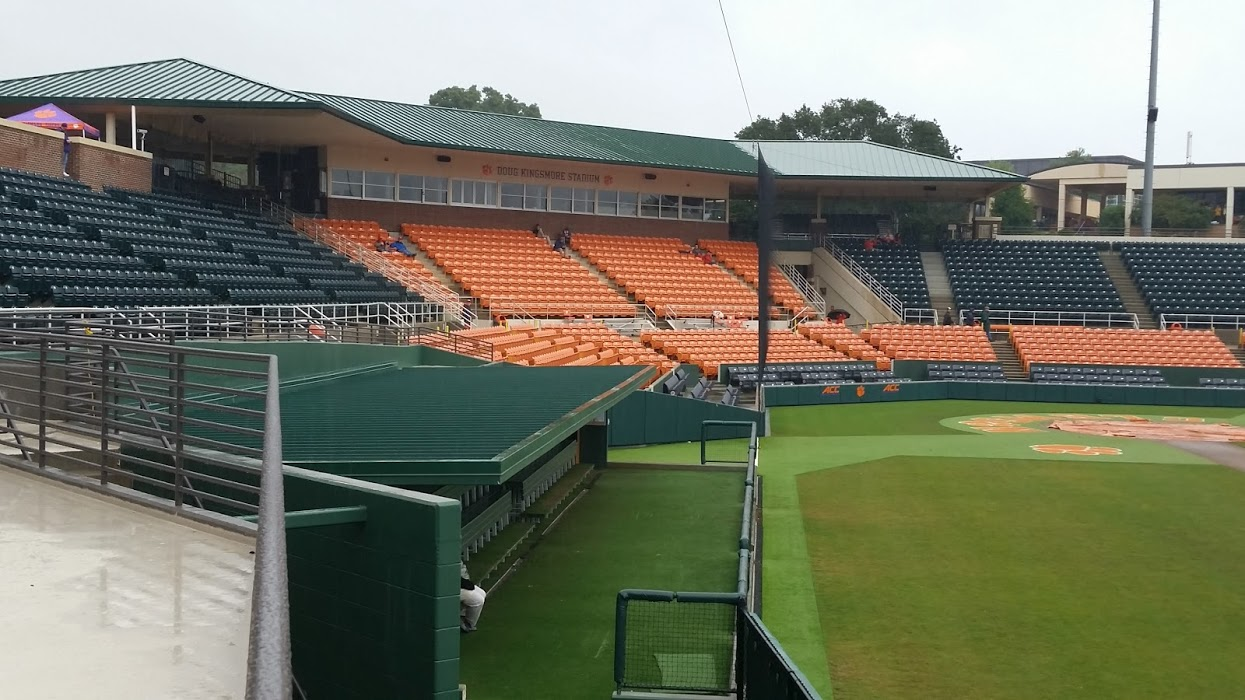
Doug Kingsmore Stadium

In 2020, the Tigers ranked ninth among Division I baseball programs in attendance, averaging 4,311 per home game. Additionally, the Tigers ranked first in the ACC in average attendance.

The attendance record for Doug Kingsmore Stadium was broken again on February 28, 2025, when 6,891 fans watched the Tigers defeat South Carolina 5–3.

== See also ==
- List of NCAA Division I baseball venues
