= Jerry Keller (baseball) =

- First baseman / Catcher
- Born: February 9, 1955 (age 71); Royal Oak, Michigan, U.S.
- Bats: Right Throws: Right

Career statistics
- Batting average: .251
- Home runs: 203
- Runs batted in: 674
- On-base percentage: .347
- Slugging percentage: .460
- Games played: 1,103
- Stats at Baseball Reference

Teams
- Kingsport Braves (1976); Greenwood Braves (1976); Savannah Braves (1977–1978); Richmond Braves (1978–1982); Portland Beavers (1983); Syracuse Chiefs (1984–1985)

Charles Bricker Keller (born February 9, 1955) is an American former first baseman, catcher and designated hitter in Minor League Baseball. He played from 1976 through 1985 in the Atlanta Braves, Philadelphia Phillies and Toronto Blue Jays organizations. Listed at 6' 4", 210 lb., Keller batted and threw right handed. He was born in Royal Oak, Michigan.

Though he never played at the major league level, Keller played entirely at Triple-A – the classification directly below the major leagues – in seven of his 10 seasons and spent part of an eighth year there, as well. He hit over 200 home runs in his decade playing professional baseball.

Keller was drafted by major league teams twice. He was initially taken by the Montreal Expos in the 20th round of the 1973 draft out of Seaholm High School in Birmingham, Michigan, but did not sign a contract. He did sign after being taken by the Braves in the 10th round of the 1976 MLB draft out of Eastern Michigan University, where he earned All-Mid-American Conference honors in 1975 and 1976.

In his first professional season, 1976, Keller hit a combined .339 average with 11 home runs, 54 RBI, a .425 on-base percentage and a .571 slugging percentage in 62 games between two teams. He played for the Kingsport Braves, with whom he hit .362 with six home runs in 41 games, and the Greenwood Braves, with whom he hit .296 with five home runs in 21 games.

Keller earned an invitation to major league spring training in 1977, to compete with Willie Montañez for the Braves' first base job. He did not make the big league club and was sent to Double-A. With the Savannah Braves in 1977, Keller hit .253 with 17 home runs and 86 RBI in 138 games to lead the Southern League in RBI. He tied Tom Chism and Al Javier for the league lead in home runs. Though he spent four games with the Triple-A Richmond Braves in 1978 – hitting .400 in 15 at-bats – he spent most of the year with Savannah, hitting .251 in 124 games. Overall, he hit .255 with 21 home runs and 77 RBI in 128 games that year.

Keller joined Richmond again in 1979 and remained there until 1982. With the club in 1979, he hit .255 with 21 home runs and 75 RBI in 126 games to tie Sam Bowen with the International League lead in RBI. In 1980, he hit .197 with 20 home runs and 48 RBI in 117 games and in 1981, he hit .191 with 22 home runs and 60 RBI in 98 games. He hit .285 with 28 home runs, 93 RBI, a .402 on-base percentage and a .539 slugging percentage in 122 games during his final season with the team.

Upon joining the Phillies organization as a free agent for 1983, Keller hit .273 with 28 home runs and 75 RBI in 119 games for the Triple-A Portland Beavers. His slugging percentage was .543. The Phillies signed him for 1984 and he hit .249 with 28 home runs and 82 RBI in 124 games for the Triple-A Syracuse Chiefs. That year, he led the International League in home runs and made the league's All-Star team. He returned to Syracuse in 1985, his final season, and hit .208 with seven home runs and 24 RBI in 69 games.

In between, Keller played winter ball with the Leones del Caracas and Tiburones de La Guaira clubs of the Venezuelan Professional Baseball League, playing for them in the 1979-80 and 1982-83 seasons, respectively.

Overall, Keller hit .251 with 203 home runs, 674 RBI, 523 runs, 942 hits, 146 doubles, 16 triples, 11 stolen bases, 546 walks and 805 strikeouts in 3,757 at-bats over 1,103 career games. He slugged .460 and had a .347 on-base percentage. He hit at least 20 home runs a year from 1978 to 1984, a seven-year stretch.
