= Kurt Seibert =

American baseball player (born 1955)

- Pinch runner / Second basemen
- Born: October 16, 1955; Cheverly, Maryland, U.S.
- Batted: Both Threw: Right

MLB debut
- September 3, 1979, for the Chicago Cubs

Last MLB appearance
- September 30, 1979, for the Chicago Cubs

MLB statistics
- Games played: 7
- At bats: 2
- Hits: 0
- Stats at Baseball Reference

Teams
- Chicago Cubs (1979)

Kurt Elliot Seibert (born October 16, 1955) is an American former Major League Baseball second baseman. Seibert played for the Chicago Cubs in 1979. In seven career games, he had no hits in two at-bats. He was a switch-hitter, who threw right-handed.

Seibert was drafted by the Cubs in the third round of the 1976 draft.

He attended Clemson University.
