= Chuck Porter (baseball) =

American baseball player (born 1956)

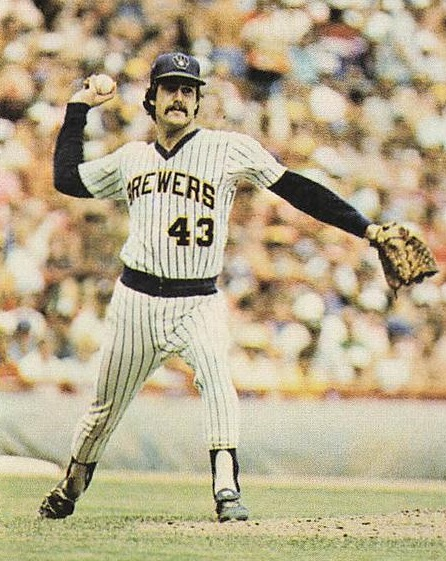
- Porter with the Milwaukee Brewers
- Pitcher
- Born: January 12, 1955 (age 71); Baltimore, Maryland, U.S.
- Batted: Right Threw: Right

MLB debut
- September 14, 1981, for the Milwaukee Brewers

Last MLB appearance
- October 6, 1985, for the Milwaukee Brewers

MLB statistics
- Win–loss record: 13–13
- Earned run average: 4.14
- Strikeouts: 136
- Stats at Baseball Reference

Teams
- Milwaukee Brewers (1981–1985)

Charles William Porter (born January 12, 1955), is an American former professional baseball player, a pitcher in Major League Baseball (MLB) from 1981 to 1985 for the Milwaukee Brewers. Prior to turning professional, he played for the Clemson Tigers, where he was named ACC Player of the Year in 1976. He gave up a home run that ended the longest game in MLB history on May 9, 1984, hit by Harold Baines of the Chicago White Sox.
