= Glenn Gulliver =

American baseball player (born 1954)

- Third baseman
- Born: October 15, 1954 (age 71); Detroit, Michigan, U.S.
- Bats: Left Throws: Right

MLB debut
- July 17, 1982, Baltimore Orioles

Last MLB appearance
- October 1, 1983, Baltimore Orioles

MLB statistics
- Batting average: .203
- Home runs: 1
- Runs batted in: 7
- OBP: .356
- Stats at Baseball Reference

Teams
- Baltimore Orioles (1982–1983)

Glenn James Gulliver (born October 15, 1954) is an American former Major League Baseball (MLB) third baseman who played for the Baltimore Orioles in 1982 and 1983.

== Amateur career ==
A native of Detroit, Michigan, Gulliver played shortstop on the Eastern Michigan University baseball team that lost to Arizona University in the 1976 College World Series championship game. In 1975, he played collegiate summer baseball with the Orleans Cardinals of the Cape Cod Baseball League and was named a league all-star.

== Professional career ==
He was drafted in the 8th round of the 1976 MLB draft by the Detroit Tigers, Gulliver made his major league debut for the Baltimore Orioles on July 17, 1982. In all, Gulliver appeared in 73 games as a third baseman for the Orioles from 1982 to 1983.

Gulliver posted a .203 batting average (39-for-192) with 29 runs, 10 doubles, 1 home run, 7 RBI and 46 bases on balls. Defensively, he handled 176 out of 180 total chances at third base for a .978 fielding percentage.

== Personal ==
Gulliver is a high school baseball coach for Allen Park High School in Allen Park, Michigan.
