= Gene Krug =

American baseball player (born 1955)

- Pinch hitter
- Born: February 12, 1955; Garden City, Kansas, U.S.
- Batted: Left Threw: Left

MLB debut
- April 29, 1981, for the Chicago Cubs

Last MLB appearance
- May 14, 1981, for the Chicago Cubs

MLB statistics
- Games played: 7
- At bats: 5
- Hits: 2
- Stats at Baseball Reference

Teams
- Chicago Cubs (1981)

Gary Eugene Krug (born February 12, 1955) is an American former professional baseball player. He appeared in seven Major League games as a pinch hitter for the Chicago Cubs during the 1981 season. He had two hits in five at bats, including a single in his first big-league plate appearance on April 29 against Lary Sorensen of the St. Louis Cardinals, in a game that ended in a 2–2 tie.

Krug attended Lamar Community College and the University of Oklahoma, and was selected by the Cubs in the 29th round of the 1977 Major League Baseball draft. He threw and batted left-handed, stood 6 feet 4 inches (1.93 m) tall and weighed 225 pounds (102 kg). A first baseman, he batted .317 during his five-season minor league baseball career, with 45 home runs. He drove in 103 runs for the 1978 Bakersfield Outlaws, a co-op team in the Class A California League.
