= Mike Colbern =

American baseball player (1955–2019)

- Catcher / Outfielder
- Born: April 19, 1955; Santa Monica, California, U.S.
- Died: March 8, 2019 (aged 63); Tempe, Arizona, U.S.
- Batted: Right Threw: Right

MLB debut
- July 18, 1978, for the Chicago White Sox

Last MLB appearance
- September 29, 1979, for the Chicago White Sox

MLB statistics
- Batting average: .259
- Home runs: 2
- Runs batted in: 28
- Stats at Baseball Reference

Teams
- Chicago White Sox (1978–1979)

Michael Malloy Colbern (April 19, 1955 – March 8, 2019) was an American professional baseball catcher who played in the Major Leagues for the Chicago White Sox in the 1978 and 1979 seasons.

== Career ==
Colbern was born in Santa Monica, California. Before playing professional baseball, Colbern was an All-American at Arizona State University.

On June 18, 1976, Arizona State, then ranked #1, faced second ranked Arizona in the college world series. Arizona State was favored to win, because the top half of their line up, one that would include Colbern and future Dodgers outfielder Ken Landreaux was batting over .300. Behind the hitting of Ron Hassey and pitching of Steve Powers, Arizona pulled off the upset, 5–1.

Colbern was drafted by the Kansas City Royals in the 5th round of the 1973 MLB amateur draft out of Hawthorne High School. Colbern opted not to sign with Kansas City and instead chose to attend Arizona State. Colbern was an All-American as an outfielder. In his college career he was a career .352 hitter. In 1976, he had what might have been his best season, hitting 11 home runs while batting .361 with 78 RBIs. The Chicago White Sox drafted Colbern in 1976 in the second round of the MLB draft.

Colbern made his way through the White Sox minor league system, was batting .283 with 12 home runs and 44 runs batted in when he was called up by Chicago. He made his MLB debut on July 18, 1978, against the Milwaukee Brewers, going 1 for 4. Perhaps one of his best games occurred on September 13, 1979, when his two-run triple helped Chicago defeat the California Angels 11–5. He struggled, however, otherwise throughout the year and was sent down to the minors and never again played in the major leagues. On December 31, 1981, the White Sox traded Colbern to the Atlanta Braves for journeyman minor league pitcher Butch Edge. He played one season in the Braves minor league system, splitting his time between Triple-A Richmond and Double-A Savannah. he was released at the end of the season, ending his professional career. Though at his career in the majors, Colbern played both outfield and catcher and even a couple of games as a DH.

Though Colbern's stay in the majors was short, he was in the lineup for one of the biggest fiascoes in baseball history "Disco Demolition Night". The event involved several thousand disco records being blown up and rowdy fans storming the field. Colbern's jersey #19 currently hangs in the Elmhurst History Museum's display of the night's wild events.

Colbern was part of the 1982 Richmond Braves squad that finished 82 and 57, good enough for first place in the International League. The team was stocked with future major league talent like Terry Harper, Brad Komminsk, Brook Jacoby, and Pascual Pérez. Stuck behind veteran Larry Owen and prospect Matt Sinatro, Colbern only played in six games before finding himself down at double A.

== Lawsuit against Major League Baseball ==
In 2003, Colbern and over 1,000 players brought a civil rights action against Major League Baseball, claiming they were discriminated against by being denied pensions while a small number of Negro league players were being given this benefit. A 2006 decision by the United States Court of Appeals for the Ninth Circuit ruled in favor of Major League Baseball. Though he was not the lead plaintiff at the start, attorneys representing the former players chose him to be, mainly because of the years Colbern had already spent researching the issue. Pensions was one key issue of the suit, the other was over treatment given to the players by team doctors, mainly their use of cortisone. Colbern's post-baseball life was a rough one that included brief spells of homelessness and skyrocketing medical bills. In 2000, Colbern suffered a stroke caused by massively blocked artery. As for the ex-negro league stars that got the benefits that he and others did not, Colbern claimed he was happy that they were getting the benefits, he just wanted the players who played in the later eras to be taken care of as well. Though the players lost the courtroom battle, Major League Baseball did begin to issue payments to players. Colbern stated his would cover the cost of the many pills he had to take because of his medical condition.

The lawsuit also stated possible malpractice at the hands of team doctors. According to that part of the lawsuit, players were injected with cortisone without their consent. That part of the suit was settled with Colbern receiving two payments of $1,850.

== Death ==
Mike Colbern died on March 8, 2019.
