= Terry Bogener =

American baseball player

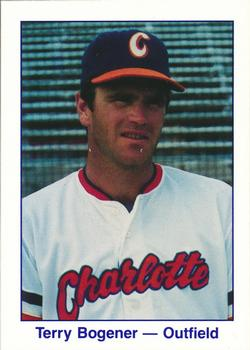
- Outfielder
- Born: September 28, 1955 (age 70); Hannibal, Missouri, U.S.
- Batted: Left Threw: Left

MLB debut
- June 14, 1982, for the Texas Rangers

Last MLB appearance
- October 3, 1982, for the Texas Rangers

MLB statistics
- Batting average: .217
- Home runs: 1
- Runs batted in: 4
- Stats at Baseball Reference

Teams
- Texas Rangers (1982)

Terry Wayne Bogener (born September 28, 1955) is an American former Major League Baseball outfielder who played for one season. He played for the Texas Rangers for 24 games during the 1982 Texas Rangers season.

Bogener grew up in Palmyra, Missouri where he shared a bedroom with his grandfather and listened to St. Louis Cardinals games every night on his grandfather's transistor radio. His high school did not have a baseball team so he traveled to Hannibal, Missouri to play American Legion Baseball. He set his high school's all-time scoring record in basketball, a record which still stood as of 2016. He played college baseball for the Oklahoma Sooners before being selected in the sixth round of the 1978 Major League Baseball draft. Bogener set the all-time stolen bases record at Oklahoma.

Bogener hit a home run in his first at bat in Major League Baseball.

In January 2008, he and his wife, Carolyn, moved to Estes Park, Colorado where they owned several vacation properties.
