= Keith Drumright =

American baseball player (1954-2010)

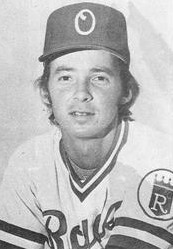
- Drumright with the Omaha Royals in 1980
- Second baseman
- Born: October 21, 1954; Springfield, Missouri, U.S.
- Died: August 7, 2010 (aged 55); Springfield, Missouri, U.S.
- Batted: Left Threw: Right

MLB debut
- September 1, 1978, for the Houston Astros

Last MLB appearance
- October 4, 1981, for the Oakland Athletics

MLB statistics
- Batting average: .241
- Home runs: 0
- Runs batted in: 13
- Stats at Baseball Reference

Teams
- Houston Astros (1978); Oakland Athletics (1981)

Keith Alan Drumright (October 21, 1954 – August 7, 2010) was an American Major League Baseball second baseman. He played parts of two seasons in the major leagues. He played for the Houston Astros in 1978 and the Oakland Athletics in 1981.

Drumright attended Hillcrest High School in Springfield, Missouri, where he was part of a state championship team. He went on to attend the University of Oklahoma, where he was an All-American second baseman.

== Career ==
On June 6, 1972, Drumright was drafted by the Montreal Expos in the 18th round of the 1972 amateur draft, but did not sign with the team. On June 8, 1976, he was drafted by the Chicago Cubs in the 4th round of the 1976 amateur draft, and signed a contract with the team. On October 13, 1977, he was traded by the Chicago Cubs to the Houston Astros for Al Javier. He was called to the Houston Astros in September 1978, after spending the earlier part of the season in the minors. He had five hits in his first 10 at-bats, then went hitless in 33 at bats before recovering somewhat by going 4 for 12 to end the season. He finished the season with a .163 batting average.

On October 26, 1979, he was sent by the Houston Astros to the Omaha Royals to complete an earlier deal made on April 27, 1979. On December 11, 1980, he was traded by the Chicago Cubs, along with Cliff Johnson, to the Oakland Athletics for Michael King. In 1981, he was hitting well, and finished the season with a .290 batting average.

== Death ==
Drumright died of a self-inflicted gunshot wound on August 7, 2010.
