= Wyoming Cowboys baseball =

- Founded: 1938
- Defunct: 1996; 30 years ago
- Conference history: Mountain States / Skyline (1938–1962); WAC (1963–1996)
- Overall record: 1,009–1,057
- University: University of Wyoming
- Location: Laramie, Wyoming
- Home stadium: Cowboy Field
- Nickname: Wyoming Cowboys
- Colors: Brown and gold

College World Series appearances
- 1956

NCAA tournament appearances
- 1954, 1955, 1956, 1961, 1966

Conference regular season champions
- 1954, 1995, 1956

The Wyoming Cowboys baseball team was a varsity intercollegiate athletic team of the University of Wyoming in Laramie, Wyoming, United States. The team played in the National Collegiate Athletic Association (NCAA) at the Division I level as a member of the Western Athletic Conference (WAC) from 1962 until 1996. The Cowboys made their only appearance in the College World Series in 1956, and that Cowboys team was inducted into the University of Wyoming Hall of Fame in 2006.
