= 1974 College Baseball All-America Team =

This is a list of college baseball players named first team All-Americans for the 1974 NCAA Division I baseball season. From 1964 to 1980, there were two generally recognized All-America selectors for baseball: the American Baseball Coaches Association and The Sporting News.

== Key ==
A	American Baseball Coaches Association
S	The Sporting News
	Member of the National College Baseball Hall of Fame
	Consensus All-American – selected by both organizations
	Consensus All-American – selected by one organization

== All-Americans ==
Position	Name	School	#	A	S	Other awards and honors
Pitcher	Earl Bass	South Carolina	1	✓	—	
Pitcher	Tom Brennan	Lewis	1	—	✓	
Pitcher	Roger Coe	Toledo	1	—	✓	
Pitcher	Jim Gideon	Texas	1	✓	—	
Catcher	Dennis Haines	Arizona	1	—	✓	
Catcher	Ken St. Pierre	Indiana	1	✓	—	
First baseman	Orlando Gonzalez	Miami (FL)	2	✓	✓	
Second baseman	Jim Hacker	Texas A&M	1	✓	—	
Second baseman	Mike Miley	LSU	1	—	✓	
Shortstop	Bill Almon	Brown	2	✓	✓	The Sporting News Player of the Year First overall pick in the 1974 MLB draft
Third baseman	Rich Dauer	USC	2	✓	✓	
Outfielder	Dave Bergman	Illinois State	1	—	✓	
Outfielder	Steve Bowling	Tulsa	1	✓	—	
Outfielder	Marv Chamberlain	Washington State	1	✓	—	
Outfielder	Pat Curran	Chapman	1	—	✓	
Outfielder	Lee Iorg	BYU	1	✓	—	
Outfielder	David Reeves	Texas	1	—	✓	
Designated hitter	Gene Delyon	Santa Clara	1	✓	—	

== See also ==
- List of college baseball awards
