= 1974 Oklahoma Sooners baseball team =

American college baseball season

1974 Oklahoma Sooners baseball

NCAA District 5 champions Big Eight Conference champions

College World Series, 1–2
- Conference: Big Eight Conference
- Record: 43–8 (18–3 Big Eight)
- Head coach: Enos Semore (7th year)
- Home stadium: Haskell Park

1974 Big Eight Conference baseball standings
| | Conf. | | | | Overall |
| Team | W | | L | PCT | W | | L | PCT |
|---|---|---|---|---|---|---|---|---|
| No. 5 Oklahoma ‍†‍‍^{y} | 18 | – | 3 | .857 | 43 | – | 8 | .843 |
| Kansas State ‍‍‍ | 14 | – | 7 | .667 | 31 | – | 16 | .660 |
| Missouri ‍‍‍ | 12 | – | 9 | .571 | 28 | – | 14 | .667 |
| Colorado ‍‍‍ | 10 | – | 11 | .476 | 27 | – | 19 | .587 |
| Oklahoma State ‍‍‍ | 9 | – | 12 | .429 | 24 | – | 17 | .585 |
| Iowa State ‍‍‍ | 7 | – | 10 | .412 | 17 | – | 17 | .500 |
| Kansas ‍‍‍ | 6 | – | 12 | .333 | 17 | – | 22 | .436 |
| Nebraska ‍‍‍ | 4 | – | 16 | .200 | 13 | – | 27 | .325 |
† – Conference champion y – Invited to the NCAA tournament As of June 30, 1974; Rankings from Collegiate Baseball

The 1974 Oklahoma Sooners baseball team represented the University of Oklahoma in the 1974 NCAA Division I baseball season. The Sooners played their home games at Haskell Park, and played as part of the Big Eight Conference. The team was coached by Enos Semore in his seventh season as head coach at Oklahoma.

The Sooners reached the College World Series, their fourth appearance in Omaha, where they finished tied for fifth place after recording an opening round win against Northern Colorado and losing games to runner-up Miami (FL) and semifinalist Texas.

== Personnel ==
=== Roster ===
1974 Oklahoma Sooners roster
| Pitchers: 1 - Stan Meek; 16 - Kenneth Palmer; 18 - Marty Kunkler; 18 - Timothy Paul Fox; 19 - F. Breen Newcomer; 21 - Bob Shirley; 26 - Mickey Lewis Lashley | Catchers: 12 - Jacky Ray Parish; Outfielders: 7 - Bill E. Severns; 8 - Wayne G. Pechek; 9 - Kenny King; 11 - Stanley Herbert Lawrence; Infielders: 2 - Keith Drumright; 3 - Kelly Ray Snider; 5 - Charles Redmon; 6 - Michael J. Cunico; 23 - Mike Umfleet | 4 - Thomas R. Eaton; 4 - Rick A. Jenson; 14 - Patrick Sullivan; 17 - Terry Jolly; 20 - Doug E. Schaefer |

=== Coaches ===
1974 Oklahoma Sooners baseball coaching staff
- - Enos Semore - Head coach - 7th Season
- - Gene Stephenson - Assistant coach - 2nd season

== Schedule and results ==
Legend
| Oklahoma win |
| Oklahoma loss |

1974 Oklahoma Sooners baseball game log
Regular season

March
| Date | Opponent | Site/Stadium | Score | Overall Record | Big 8 Record |
|---|---|---|---|---|---|
| Mar 5 | at TCU* | TCU Diamond • Fort Worth, TX | W 12–8 | 1–0 | |
| Mar 5 | at TCU* | TCU Diamond • Fort Worth, TX | W 5–4 | 2–0 | |
| Mar 9 | at UTEP* | Dudley Field • El Paso, TX | W 21–1 | 3–0 | |
| Mar 9 | at New Mexico State* | Las Cruces, NM | W 9–4 | 4–0 | |
| Mar 9 | at New Mexico State* | Las Cruces, NM | W 2–0 | 5–0 | |
| Mar 11 | at UNLV* | Rebel Field • Paradise, NV | W 5–1 | 6–0 | |
| Mar 11 | at UNLV* | Rebel Field • Paradise, NV | W 6–3 | 7–0 | |
| Mar 15 | vs Iowa* | Packard Stadium • Tempe, AZ | W 8–4 | 8–0 | |
| Mar 15 | vs Wyoming* | Packard Stadium • Tempe, AZ | W 9–5 | 9–0 | |
| Mar 15 | at Arizona State* | Phoenix Municipal Stadium • Phoenix, AZ | W 11–4 | 10–0 | |
| Mar 16 | vs Southern Utah* | Packard Stadium • Tempe, AZ | L 3–7 | 10–1 | |
| Mar 16 | at Arizona State* | Packard Stadium • Tempe, AZ | L 3–4 | 10–2 | |
| Mar 16 | at Arizona State* | Packard Stadium • Tempe, AZ | W 10–6 | 11–2 | |
| Mar 19 | Central State* | Haskell Park • Norman, OK | W 13–3 | 12–2 | |
| Mar 19 | Central State* | Haskell Park • Norman, OK | W 14–0 | 13–2 | |
| Mar 26 | Minnesota Morris Cougars* | Haskell Park • Norman, OK | W 12–0 | 14–2 | |
| Mar 26 | Minnesota Morris* | Haskell Park • Norman, OK | W 13–3 | 15–2 | |
| Mar 29 | Kansas | Haskell Park • Norman, OK | W 25–1 | 16–2 | 1–0 |
| Mar 30 | Kansas | Haskell Park • Norman, OK | W 9–0 | 17–2 | 2–0 |
| Mar 30 | Kansas | Haskell Park • Norman, OK | W 3–1 | 18–2 | 3–0 |

April
| Date | Opponent | Site/Stadium | Score | Overall Record | Big 8 Record |
|---|---|---|---|---|---|
| Apr 2 | Oral Roberts* | Haskell Park • Norman, OK | W 6–0 | 19–2 | |
| Apr 2 | Oral Roberts* | Haskell Park • Norman, OK | W 6–2 | 20–2 | |
| Apr 5 | at Nebraska | Nebraska Diamond • Lincoln, NE | W 3–1 | 21–2 | 4–0 |
| Apr 5 | at Nebraska | Nebraska Diamond • Lincoln, NE | W 4–3 | 22–2 | 5–0 |
| Apr 6 | at Nebraska | Nebraska Diamond • Lincoln, NE | W 8–3 | 23–2 | 6–0 |
| Apr 9 | USC* | Haskell Park • Norman, OK | W 7–6 | 24–2 | |
| Apr 9 | USC* | Haskell Park • Norman, OK | W 5–4 | 25–2 | |
| Apr 12 | at Missouri | Simmons Field • Columbia, MO | L 4–5 | 25–3 | 6–1 |
| Apr 12 | at Missouri | Simmons Field • Columbia, MO | W 7–0 | 26–3 | 7–1 |
| Apr 13 | at Missouri | Simmons Field • Columbia, MO | W 17–14 | 27–3 | 8–1 |
| Apr 16 | TCU* | Haskell Park • Norman, OK | W 7–3 | 28–3 | |
| Apr 16 | TCU* | Haskell Park • Norman, OK | W 14–11 | 29–3 | |
| Apr 19 | Iowa State | Haskell Park • Norman, OK | W 2–0 | 30–3 | 9–1 |
| Apr 19 | Iowa State | Haskell Park • Norman, OK | W 2–0 | 31–3 | 10–1 |
| Apr 20 | Iowa State | Haskell Park • Norman, OK | W 6–0 | 32–3 | 11–1 |
| Apr 23 | Oklahoma Christian* | Haskell Park • Norman, OK | W 5–3 | 33–3 | |
| Apr 23 | Oklahoma Christian* | Haskell Park • Norman, OK | L 3–5 | 33–4 | |
| Apr 26 | at Oklahoma State | University Park • Stillwater, OK | W 4–3 | 34–4 | 12–1 |
| Apr 26 | at Oklahoma State | University Park • Stillwater, OK | W 10–3 | 35–4 | 13–1 |
| Apr 27 | at Oklahoma State | University Park • Stillwater, OK | W 7–3 | 36–4 | 14–1 |

May
| Date | Opponent | Site/Stadium | Score | Overall Record | Big 8 Record |
|---|---|---|---|---|---|
| May 3 | at Kansas State | KSU Baseball Stadium • Manhattan, KS | L 4–5 | 36–5 | 14–2 |
| May 3 | at Kansas State | KSU Baseball Stadium • Manhattan, KS | W 3–0 | 37–5 | 15–2 |
| May 4 | at Kansas State | KSU Baseball Stadium • Manhattan, KS | W 7–1 | 38–5 | 16–2 |
| May 10 | Colorado | Haskell Park • Norman, OK | W 2–0 | 39–5 | 17–2 |
| May 11 | Colorado | Haskell Park • Norman, OK | W 8–1 | 40–5 | 18–2 |
| May 11 | Colorado | Haskell Park • Norman, OK | L 2–8 | 40–6 | 18–3 |

Postseason

NCAA District 5
| Date | Opponent | Rank/Seed | Site/Stadium | Score | Overall Record | Reg Record |
|---|---|---|---|---|---|---|
| May 30 | Tulsa | All Sports Stadium • Oklahoma City, OK | W 6–2 | 41–6 | 1–0 | |
| June 1 | Tulsa | All Sports Stadium • Oklahoma City, OK | W 5–4 | 42–6 | 2–0 | |

College World Series
| Date | Opponent | Site/Stadium | Score | Overall Record | CWS Record |
|---|---|---|---|---|---|
| June 7 | Northern Colorado | Johnny Rosenblatt Stadium • Omaha, NE | W 10–1 | 43–6 | 1–0 |
| June 10 | Miami (FL) | Johnny Rosenblatt Stadium • Omaha, NE | L 1–5 | 43–7 | 1–1 |
| June 11 | Texas | Johnny Rosenblatt Stadium • Omaha, NE | L 4–10 | 43–8 | 1–2 |
