= 1974 NCAA Division I baseball rankings =

1974 NCAA Division I baseball season

Tournament

College World Series
- Champions: USC
- Runners-up: Miami
- MOP: George Milke (USC)

Seasons
- ← 1973 1975 →

The following poll makes up the 1974 NCAA Division I baseball rankings. Collegiate Baseball Newspaper published its first human poll of the top 20 teams in college baseball in 1957, and expanded to rank the top 30 teams in 1961.

== Collegiate Baseball ==
Currently, only the final poll from the 1974 season is available.

| Rank | Team |
|---|---|
| 1 | USC |
| 2 | Miami (FL) |
| 3 | Southern Illinois |
| 4 | Texas |
| 5 | Oklahoma |
| 6 | Northern Colorado |
| 7 | Harvard |
| 8 | Seton Hall |
| 9 | Arizona |
| 10 | South Carolina |
| 11 | Georgia Southern |
| 12 | Cal State Los Angeles |
| 13 | Louisiana Tech |
| 14 | Vanderbilt |
| 15 | Texas–Pan American |
| 16 | Minnesota |
| 17 | Iowa |
| 18 | Miami (OH) |
| 19 | Arizona State |
| 20 | Santa Clara |
| 21 | Texas A&M |
| 22 | TCU |
| 23 | Tulsa |
| 24 | Pepperdine |
| 25 | East Carolina |
| 26 | St. John's |
| 27 | Penn State |
| 28 | Murray State |
| 29 | Oregon |
| 30 | Gonzaga |
