= 1974 NCAA Division I baseball season =

Baseball season

- Number of teams: 221

NCAA tournament

College World Series
- Champions: Southern California (10th title)
- Runners-up: Miami (FL) (1st CWS Appearance)
- Winning coach: Rod Dedeaux (10th title)
- MOP: George Milke (Southern California)

Seasons
- ← 1973 1975 →

The 1974 NCAA Division I baseball season, play of college baseball in the United States organized by the National Collegiate Athletic Association (NCAA) began in the spring of 1974. The season progressed through the regular season and concluded with the 1974 College World Series. The College World Series, held for the 28th time in 1974, consisted of one team from each of eight geographical districts and was held in Omaha, Nebraska at Johnny Rosenblatt Stadium as a double-elimination tournament. Southern California claimed the championship for the fifth year in a row, the first team to claim five consecutive titles.

== Realignment ==
- Arkansas rejoined the Southwest Conference after nearly 50 years, having departed the conference in 1926.

== Conference winners ==
This is a partial list of conference champions from the 1974 season. Each of the eight geographical districts chose, by various methods, the team that would represent them in the NCAA tournament. 15 teams earned automatic bids by winning their conference championship while 13 teams earned at-large selections.

Conference	Regular season winner	Conference tournament	Tournament venue • city	Tournament winner
Atlantic Coast Conference	Clemson	1974 Atlantic Coast Conference baseball tournament	Doak Field • Raleigh, NC	NC State
Big Eight Conference	Oklahoma	No tournament		
Big Ten Conference	Iowa/Minnesota	No tournament		
EIBL	Harvard	No tournament		
Mid-American Conference	Miami (OH)	No tournament		
Pacific-8 Conference	North - Oregon/Washington State; South - Southern California	No tournament		
Southeastern Conference	Vanderbilt	No tournament		
Southern Conference	East Carolina	No tournament		
Southwest Conference	Texas	No tournament		
Yankee Conference	Rhode Island	No tournament		

== Conference standings ==
The following is an incomplete list of conference standings:

1974 Atlantic Coast Conference baseball standings
	Conf.				Overall
Team	W		L	PCT	W		L	PCT
Clemson ‍†‍‍	10	–	1	.909	23	–	15	.605
North Carolina ‍‍‍	9	–	3	.750	22	–	8	.733
NC State ‍‍‡‍^{y}	7	–	5	.583	22	–	12	.647
Maryland ‍‍‍	6	–	6	.500	11	–	17	.393
Virginia ‍‍‍	6	–	6	.500	21	–	17	.553
Duke ‍‍‍	3	–	8	.273	9	–	16	.360
Wake Forest ‍‍‍	0	–	12	.000	8	–	20	.286
† – Conference champion ‡ – Tournament champion y – Invited to the NCAA tournament As of June 30, 1974; Rankings from Collegiate Baseball

1974 Big Eight Conference baseball standings
	Conf.				Overall
Team	W		L	PCT	W		L	PCT
No. 5 Oklahoma ‍†‍‍^{y}	18	–	3	.857	43	–	8	.843
Kansas State ‍‍‍	14	–	7	.667	31	–	16	.660
Missouri ‍‍‍	12	–	9	.571	28	–	14	.667
Colorado ‍‍‍	10	–	11	.476	27	–	19	.587
Oklahoma State ‍‍‍	9	–	12	.429	24	–	17	.585
Iowa State ‍‍‍	7	–	10	.412	17	–	17	.500
Kansas ‍‍‍	6	–	12	.333	17	–	22	.436
Nebraska ‍‍‍	4	–	16	.200	13	–	27	.325
† – Conference champion y – Invited to the NCAA tournament As of June 30, 1974; Rankings from Collegiate Baseball

1974 Great Plains Athletic Conference baseball standings
	Conf.				Overall
Team	W		L	PCT	W		L	PCT
No. 6 Northern Colorado ‍†‍‍^{y}	5	–	1	.833	32	–	13	.711
Southern Colorado State ‍‍‍	1	–	3	.250	15	–	21	.417
Emporia State ‍‍‍	0	–	2	.000		–		–
† – Conference champion y – Invited to the College World Series; As of June 30, 1974; Rankings from Collegiate Baseball

1974 Metropolitan Intercollegiate Conference baseball standings
	Conf.						Overall
Team	W		L		PCT		W	L		PCT
No. 8 Seton Hall ‍†‍‍^{y}	14	–	2	–	0	.875		33	–	10	–	1	.761
Fairleigh Dickinson ‍‍‍	12	–	4	–	0	.750		22	–	9	–	0	.710
C. W. Post ‍‍‍	11	–	5	–	0	.688		21	–	9	–	0	.700
LIU ‍‍‍	10	–	6	–	0	.625		17	–	13	–	0	.567
Iona ‍‍‍	7	–	9	–	0	.438		10	–	13	–	0	.435
Manhattan ‍‍‍	6	–	10	–	0	.375		9	–	12	–	0	.429
Wagner ‍‍‍	2	–	13	–	0	.133		6	–	15	–	0	.286
CCNY ‍‍‍	2	–	13	–	0	.133		2	–	19	–	0	.095
St. Francis (NY) ‍‍‍	0	–	0	–	0	–		8	–	12	–	0	.400
† – Conference champion y – Invited to the NCAA tournament As of June 17, 1974; Rankings from Collegiate Baseball

1974 NCAA Division I District 3 baseball independents standings
	Conf.				Overall
Team	W		L	PCT	W		L	PCT
No. 10 South Carolina ‍‍‍^{y}		–		–	48	–	8	.857
No. 2 Miami (FL) ‍‍‍^{y}		–		–	51	–	11	.823
South Alabama ‍‍‍		–		–	30	–	8	.789
No. 11 Georgia Southern ‍‍‍^{y}		–		–	47	–	14	.770
Stetson ‍‍‍		–		–	30	–	13	.698
Florida State ‍‍‍		–		–	37	–	25	.597
Marshall ‍‍‍		–		–	21	–	15	.583
South Florida ‍‍‍		–		–	21	–	16	.568
Georgia Tech ‍‍‍		–		–	20	–	17	.541
Virginia Tech ‍‍‍		–		–	15	–	15	.500
Mercer ‍‍‍		–		–	15	–	19	.441
Western Carolina ‍‍‍		–		–	11	–	14	.440
Georgetown ‍‍‍		–		–	7	–	11	.389
Jacksonville ‍‍‍		–		–	19	–	36	.345
y – Invited to the NCAA tournament As of June 30, 1974; Rankings from Collegiate Baseball

1974 Pacific-8 Conference baseball standings
	Conf.				Overall
Team	W		L	PCT	W		L	PCT
Northern Division
Washington State ^{x}‍‍‍	14	–	4	.778	38	–	9	.809
No. 29 Oregon ‍‍‍	12	–	6	.667		–		–
Oregon State ‍‍‍	6	–	12	.333	16	–	23	.410
Washington ‍‍‍	5	–	12	.294	10	–	28	.263
Southern Division
No. 1 Southern California ^{x}‍‍‍^{y}	11	–	7	.611	50	–	20	.714
Stanford ‍‍‍	10	–	8	.556	28	–	19	.596
California ‍‍‍	8	–	10	.444	25	–	24	.510
UCLA ‍‍‍	7	–	11	.389	26	–	35	.426
x – Division champion y – Invited to the NCAA tournament As of June 30, 1974; Rankings from Collegiate Baseball

1974 Southern Conference baseball standings
	Conf.				Overall
Team	W		L	PCT	W		L	PCT
No. 25 East Carolina ‍†‍‍^{y}	12	–	2	.857	17	–	13	.567
Appalachian State ‍‍‍	9	–	5	.643	20	–	13	.606
Richmond ‍‍‍	9	–	5	.643	22	–	12	.647
The Citadel ‍‍‍	7	–	7	.500	17	–	11	.607
Davidson ‍‍‍	6	–	8	.429	10	–	15	.400
VMI ‍‍‍	5	–	9	.357	6	–	14	.300
William & Mary ‍‍‍	5	–	9	.357	8	–	17	.320
Furman ‍‍‍	3	–	11	.214	14	–	20	.412
y – Invited to the NCAA tournament As of June 30, 1974; Rankings from Collegiate Baseball

1974 Southwest Conference baseball standings
	Conf.				Overall
Team	W		L	PCT	W		L	PCT
No. 4 Texas ‍†‍‍^{y}	20	–	4	.833	54	–	8	.871
No. 21 Texas A&M ‍‍‍	17	–	7	.708	31	–	13	.705
No. 22 TCU ‍‍‍	14	–	10	.583	31	–	17	.646
Rice ‍‍‍	12	–	11	.522	24	–	18	.571
Baylor ‍‍‍	12	–	11	.522	24	–	18	.571
Houston ‍‍‍	10	–	13	.435	20	–	21	.488
Arkansas ‍‍‍	9	–	15	.375	22	–	21	.512
Texas Tech ‍‍‍	9	–	15	.375	11	–	22	.333
SMU ‍‍‍	4	–	20	.167	16	–	26	.381
† – Conference champion y – Invited to the NCAA tournament As of June 30, 1974; Rankings from Collegiate Baseball

1974 Western Athletic Conference baseball standings
	Conf.				Overall
Team	W		L	PCT	W		L	PCT
Northern
BYU ^{x}‍‍‍	12	–	5	.706	29	–	17	.630
Utah ‍‍‍	11	–	7	.611	18	–	25	.419
Wyoming ‍‍‍	7	–	10	.412	28	–	28	.500
Colorado State ‍‍‍	4	–	12	.250	13	–	24	.351
Southern
No. 9 Arizona ^{x}‍‍‡‍^{y}	16	–	2	.889	58	–	6	.906
No. 19 Arizona State ‍‍‍^{y}	12	–	6	.667	39	–	24	.619
New Mexico ‍‍‍	6	–	12	.333	28	–	23	.549
UTEP ‍‍‍	2	–	16	.111	24	–	27	.471
x – Division champion ‡ – Playoff champion y – Invited to the NCAA tournament As of June 30, 1974; Rankings from Collegiate Baseball

== College World Series ==
The 1974 season marked the twenty eighth NCAA baseball tournament, which culminated with the eight team College World Series. The College World Series was held in Omaha, Nebraska. The eight teams played a double-elimination format, with Southern California claiming their tenth championship, and fifth in a row, with a 7–3 win over Miami (FL) in the final.

Upper round 1
Miami	4
Harvard	1
Oklahoma	10
Northern Colorado	1
Southern California	9
Texas	2
Southern Illinois	5
Seton Hall	1

Upper round 2
Miami	5
Oklahoma	1
Southern California	5
Southern Illinois	3
Lower round 1
Harvard	2
Northern Colorado	4
Texas	12
Seton Hall	2

Upper final
Miami	7
Southern California	3
Lower round 2
Northern Colorado	2
Southern Illinois	5
Texas	10
Oklahoma	4

Semifinals
Miami	3
Southern Illinois	4
Southern California	5
Texas	3

Preliminary final
Southern Illinois	2
Southern California	7

Final
Miami	3
Southern California	7
