= 1992 Texas Longhorns baseball team =

American college baseball season

1992 Texas Longhorns baseball

Southwest Conference champions

College World Series, 2–2
- Conference: Southwest Conference
- CB: No. 4
- Record: 48–17 (28–8 SWC)
- Head coach: Cliff Gustafson (25th year)
- Home stadium: Disch–Falk Field

1992 Southwest Conference baseball standings
	Conf.				Overall
Team	W		L	PCT	W		L	PCT
No. 4 Texas ‍†‍‍^{y}	28	–	8	.778	48	–	17	.738
No. 15 Texas A&M ‍‍‍^{y}	22	–	14	.611	41	–	20	.672
Baylor ‍‍‍	17	–	19	.472	29	–	26	.527
Texas Tech ‍‍‍	15	–	19	.441	29	–	25	.537
Rice ‍‍‍	15	–	21	.417	29	–	26	.527
TCU ‍‍‍	14	–	22	.389	25	–	30	.455
Houston ‍‍‍	13	–	21	.382	25	–	28	.472
† – Conference champion y – Invited to the NCAA tournament As of June 30, 1992; Rankings from Collegiate Baseball

The 1992 Texas Longhorns baseball team represented the University of Texas at Austin in the 1992 NCAA Division I baseball season. The Longhorns played their home games at Disch–Falk Field. The team was coached by Cliff Gustafson in his 25th season at Texas.

The Longhorns reached the College World Series, where they recorded a pair of wins against Oklahoma and a pair of losses to eventual champion Pepperdine.

== Personnel ==
=== Roster ===
1992 Texas Longhorns roster
Pitchers: 16 - Jay Vaught; 20 - Doug Pettit; 21 - Ryan Kjos; 23 - Brooks Kieschnick; 31 - Chris Gaskill; 36 - Scott Harrison; 37 - Robert Olivo; Catchers: 26 -Chris Abbe; 39 - Scott Johnson; 12 - Shawn Pagee; Joel Williamson	Infielders: 2 - Robert DeLeon; 3 - Tim Harkrider; 5 - Greg Merrell; 9 - Clay King; 11 - Stephen Larkin; 14 - Braxton Hickman; Outfielders: 7 - Calvin Murray; 13 - Mark Prather; 15 - Jeff Conway; 30 - Charles Abernathy	Unknown: 10 - Dean Haskins; 24 - Todd Spurck; 26 - Chris Abbe; 27 - John Dickens; 29 - Brian Selenksy; 32 - Shannon Dorsey; 35 - John Ohnemiller; 33 - Greg Hillman; 34 - David Hood; 39 - Scott Johnson; 41 - Chad Smith; 42 - Troy Turman

=== Coaches ===
1992 Texas Longhorns baseball coaching staff
- Cliff Gustafson – Head coach – 25th year
- Tommy Harmon – Assistant coach – 3rd year
- Howard Bushong – Assistant coach – 2nd year
- Deron Gustafson – Assistant coach – 9th year
- Keith Moreland – Assistant coach – 1st year

== Schedule and results ==
Legend
Texas win
Texas loss
Tie

1992 Texas Longhorns baseball game log
Regular season

February
Date	Opponent	Site/stadium	Score	Overall record	SWC record
Feb 3	Hardin–Simmons*	Disch–Falk Field • Austin, TX	W 15–0	1–0	
Feb 4	Stephen F. Austin*	Disch–Falk Field • Austin, TX	W 19–0	2–0	
Feb 4	Stephen F. Austin*	Disch–Falk Field • Austin, TX	W 12–3	3–0	
Feb 7	Texas Tech	Disch–Falk Field • Austin, TX	W 2–1	4–0	1–0
Feb 8	Texas Tech	Disch–Falk Field • Austin, TX	W 9–4	5–0	2–0
Feb 9	Texas Tech	Disch–Falk Field • Austin, TX	W 5–4	6–0	3–0
Feb 14	at Rice	Cameron Field • Houston, TX	W 9–1	7–0	4–0
Feb 15	at Rice	Cameron Field • Houston, TX	L 4–9	7–1	4–1
Feb 15	at Rice	Cameron Field • Houston, TX	W 6–4	8–1	5–1
Feb 21	Arizona State*	Disch–Falk Field • Austin, TX	W 11–10^{14}	9–1	
Feb 22	Arizona State*	Disch–Falk Field • Austin, TX	W 7–6	10–1	
Feb 23	Arizona State*	Disch–Falk Field • Austin, TX	L 11–16	10–2	
Feb 28	Baylor	Disch–Falk Field • Austin, TX	W 12–5	11–2	6–1
Feb 29	Baylor	Disch–Falk Field • Austin, TX	W 7–6	12–2	7–1
Feb 29	Baylor	Disch–Falk Field • Austin, TX	W 14–5	13–2	8–1

March
Date	Opponent	Site/stadium	Score	Overall record	SWC record
Mar 2	Southwestern Louisiana*	Disch–Falk Field • Austin, TX	L 2–10	13–3	
Mar 3	Southwestern Louisiana*	Disch–Falk Field • Austin, TX	W 12–10	14–3	
Mar 6	at TCU	TCU Diamond • Fort Worth, TX	W 20–5	15–3	9–1
Mar 7	at TCU	TCU Diamond • Fort Worth, TX	W 8–4	16–3	10–1
Mar 7	at TCU	TCU Diamond • Fort Worth, TX	W 9–1	17–3	11–1
Mar 10	Oklahoma*	Disch–Falk Field • Austin, TX	W 3–2^{10}	18–3	
Mar 11	Oklahoma*	Disch–Falk Field • Austin, TX	W 11–10	19–3	
Mar 13	at Houston	Cougar Field • Houston, TX	L 2–5	19–4	11–2
Mar 14	at Houston	Cougar Field • Houston, TX	W 6–1	20–4	12–2
Mar 14	at Houston	Cougar Field • Houston, TX	L 4–11	20–5	12–3
Mar 20	Texas A&M	Disch–Falk Field • Austin, TX	L 9–11^{10}	20–6	12–4
Mar 21	Texas A&M	Disch–Falk Field • Austin, TX	W 8–1	21–6	13–4
Mar 21	Texas A&M	Disch–Falk Field • Austin, TX	W 13–2	22–6	14–4
Mar 22	at Lamar*	Vincent–Beck Stadium • Beaumont, TX	L 7–8	22–7	
Mar 23	Southwestern Louisiana*	Disch–Falk Field • Austin, TX	W 7–6^{11}	23–7	
Mar 25	Southwest Texas State*	Disch–Falk Field • Austin, TX	W 12–1	24–7	
Mar 28	Texas–Arlington*	Disch–Falk Field • Austin, TX	W 4–2	25–7	
Mar 28	Texas–Arlington*	Disch–Falk Field • Austin, TX	L 4–5^{10}	25–8	
Mar 29	Texas–Arlington*	Disch–Falk Field • Austin, TX	W 7–2	26–8	
Mar 31	at Oklahoma*	L. Dale Mitchell Baseball Park • Norman, OK	W 6–2	27–8	

April
Date	Opponent	Site/stadium	Score	Overall record	SWC record
Apr 3	TCU	Disch–Falk Field • Austin, TX	W 4–1	28–8	15–4
Apr 4	TCU	Disch–Falk Field • Austin, TX	W 9–0	29–8	16–4
Apr 4	TCU	Disch–Falk Field • Austin, TX	W 3–2	30–8	17–4
Apr 7	at Baylor	Ferrell Field • Waco, TX	W 3–1	31–8	18–4
Apr 10	at Texas A&M	Olsen Field • College Station, TX	W 10–3	32–8	19–4
Apr 11	at Texas A&M	Olsen Field • College Station, TX	W 5–4	33–8	20–4
Apr 12	at Texas A&M	Olsen Field • College Station, TX	L 5–11	33–9	20–5
Apr 17	Houston	Disch–Falk Field • Austin, TX	W 4–3	34–9	21–5
Apr 18	Houston	Disch–Falk Field • Austin, TX	L 1–4	34–10	21–6
Apr 18	Houston	Disch–Falk Field • Austin, TX	W 4–0	35–10	22–6
Apr 23	at Texas Tech	Dan Law Field • Lubbock, TX	W 6–4	36–10	23–6
Apr 24	at Texas Tech	Dan Law Field • Lubbock, TX	W 10–9	37–10	24–6
Apr 25	at Texas Tech	Dan Law Field • Lubbock, TX	W 8–1	38–10	25–6
Apr 28	at Baylor	Ferrell Field • Waco, TX	W 9–0	39–10	26–6
Apr 28	at Baylor	Ferrell Field • Waco, TX	L 2–3	39–11	27–6

May
Date	Opponent	Site/stadium	Score	Overall record	SWC record
May 1	at Miami (FL)*	Mark Light Field • Coral Gables, FL	L 1–6	39–12	
May 2	at Miami (FL)*	Mark Light Field • Coral Gables, FL	L 2–3	39–13	
May 3	at Miami (FL)*	Mark Light Field • Coral Gables, FL	W 10–3	40–13	
May 8	Rice	Disch–Falk Field • Austin, TX	W 5–0	41–13	28–6
May 9	Rice	Disch–Falk Field • Austin, TX	W 9–1	42–13	29–6
May 9	Rice	Disch–Falk Field • Austin, TX	L 2–5	42–14	29–7

Postseason

NCAA Central Regional
Date	Opponent	Seed	Site/stadium	Score	Overall record	NCAAT record
May 21	(6) VCU	(1)	Disch–Falk Field • Austin, TX	W 2–0	43–14	1–0
May 22	(4) Texas–Arlington	(1)	Disch–Falk Field • Austin, TX	W 17–1	44–14	2–0
May 23	(2) Long Beach State	(1)	Disch–Falk Field • Austin, TX	W 15–3	45–14	3–0
May	(6) VCU	(1)	Disch–Falk Field • Austin, TX	L 2–4	45–15	3–1
May 24	(6) VCU	(1)	Disch–Falk Field • Austin, TX	W 12–3	46–15	4–1

College World Series
Date	Opponent	Seed	Site/stadium	Score	Overall record	CWS record
May 30	(6) Oklahoma	(3)	Johnny Rosenblatt Stadium • Omaha, NE	W 15–3	47–15	1–0
June 1	(7) Pepperdine	(3)	Johnny Rosenblatt Stadium • Omaha, NE	L 0–7	47–16	1–1
June 2	(6) Oklahoma	(3)	Johnny Rosenblatt Stadium • Omaha, NE	W 8–5	48–16	2–1
June 4	(7) Pepperdine	(3)	Johnny Rosenblatt Stadium • Omaha, NE	L 4–5	48–17	2–2
