= 1974 Northern Colorado Bears baseball team =

American college baseball season

1974 Northern Colorado Bears baseball

Great Plains Athletic Conference champions District VII champions

College World Series, T-5th
- Conference: Great Plains Athletic Conference
- Record: 32–13 (5–1 GPAC)
- Head coach: Tom Petroff (5th season)
- Home stadium: Jackson Field

1974 Great Plains Athletic Conference baseball standings
	Conf.				Overall
Team	W		L	PCT	W		L	PCT
No. 6 Northern Colorado ‍†‍‍^{y}	5	–	1	.833	32	–	13	.711
Southern Colorado State ‍‍‍	1	–	3	.250	15	–	21	.417
Emporia State ‍‍‍	0	–	2	.000		–		–
† – Conference champion y – Invited to the College World Series; As of June 30, 1974; Rankings from Collegiate Baseball

The 1974 Northern Colorado Bears baseball team represented the University of Northern Colorado in the 1974 NCAA Division I baseball season. The Bears played their home games at Jackson Field. The team was coached by Tom Petroff in his 5th year at Colorado State.

The Bears won the District VII playoff to advanced to the College World Series, where they were defeated by the Southern Illinois Salukis.

== Roster ==
1974 Northern Colorado Bears baseball team
Players
Coaches

#	Pos.	Name	B/T	Height	Weight	Year	Home town
		Mark Aasen	/	—	—	Jr
	RHP	Keith Bailey	/R	—	—	RS Fr
		Michael Casey	/	—	—
	OF	Jeff Cheek	L/	—	—	Jr
	P	Greg Cook	/	—	—	Sr
		Mike Coy	/	—	—
	C	Bob DeMeo	R/	—	—	Sr
		John Gabbert	/	—	—
		Steve Gjertson	/	—	—
		Paul Gradishar	/	—	—
	INF	Ron Holmes	R/	—	—	Jr
	OF	Rick Kent	/	—	—
	INF	Denny Leonida	/	—	—
	RHP	Mike McNeill	/R	—	—	Sr
		John Monaco	/	—	—
		Steve Nale	/	—	—
		Larry Nelson	/	—	—
		Dave Picconi	/	—	—
		Greg Pinkington	/	—	—
		Tom Pinkington	/	—	—
		Thomas Runnells	/	—	—
		Dave Schiessler	/	—	—
		Jeff Simpson	/	—	—
	INF	Joseph Strain	/	—	—
	LHP	Rick Thoren	/L	—	—	Fr
		Paul Weatherly	/	—	—
		Alvin White	/	—	—

Head coach

Tom Petroff

Assistant coach(es)

Legend

- (C) Team captain
- (S) Suspended
- (I) Ineligible
- Injured
- Current redshirt

== Schedule ==
1974 Northern Colorado Bears baseball game log
Regular season
March (8–5)

#	Date	Opponent	Site/stadium	Score	Overall record	GPAC record
1	March	at UTEP	Unknown • El Paso, Texas	0–11	0–1	–
2	March	at UTEP	Unknown • El Paso, Texas	16–7	1–1	–
3	March	at Northern Arizona	Unknown • Flagstaff, Arizona	2–11	1–2	–
4	March	Weber State	Unknown • Unknown	5–4	2–2	–
5	March	Colorado State	Unknown • Unknown	4–3	3–2	–
6	March	Metro State	Unknown • Unknown	11–1	4–2	–
7	March	Metro State	Unknown • Unknown	14–4	5–2	–
8	March	Wyoming	Unknown • Unknown	4–6	5–3	–
9	March	Colorado State	Unknown • Unknown	3–6	5–4	–
10	March	Colorado State	Unknown • Unknown	12–13	5–5	–
11	March	Regis	Unknown • Unknown	11–2	6–5	–
12	March	Regis	Unknown • Unknown	8–0	7–5	–
13	March	Denver	Unknown • Unknown	8–4	8–5	–

April (10–5)

#	Date	Opponent	Site/stadium	Score	Overall record	GPAC record
14	April 3	Air Force	Jackson Field • Greeley, Colorado	6–5	9–5	–
15	April 3	Air Force	Jackson Field • Greeley, Colorado	1–3	9–6	–
16	April	Wyoming	Unknown • Unknown	7–4	10–6	–
17	April	Wyoming	Unknown • Unknown	4–5	10–7	–
18	April	Denver	Unknown • Unknown	6–0	11–7	–
19	April	Southern Colorado State	Unknown • Unknown	12–13	11–8	0–1
20	April	Regis	Unknown • Unknown	4–2	12–8	0–1
21	April	Regis	Unknown • Unknown	15–0	13–8	0–1
22	April	Denver	Unknown • Unknown	8–10	13–9	0–1
23	April	Western State	Unknown • Unknown	18–0	14–9	0–1
24	April	Western State	Unknown • Unknown	3–4	14–10	0–1
25	April	Colorado College	Unknown • Unknown	18–1	15–10	0–1
26	April	Colorado College	Unknown • Unknown	9–0	16–10	0–1
27	April 23	at Air Force	Falcon Baseball Field • Colorado Springs, Colorado	7–6	17–10	0–1
28	April	Metro State	Unknown • Unknown	15–2	18–10	0–1

May (9–0)

#	Date	Opponent	Site/stadium	Score	Overall record	GPAC record
29	May	Southern Colorado State	Unknown • Unknown	8–1	19–10	1–1
30	May	Southern Colorado State	Unknown • Unknown	9–5	20–10	2–1
31	May	Southern Colorado State	Unknown • Unknown	11–9	21–10	3–1
32	May	Emporia State	Unknown • Unknown	3–2	22–10	4–1
33	May	Emporia State	Unknown • Unknown	4–1	23–10	5–1
34	May	Wyoming	Unknown • Unknown	9–7	24–10	5–1
35	May	Wyoming	Unknown • Unknown	11–3	25–10	5–1
36	May	Western State	Unknown • Unknown	9–3	26–10	5–1
37	May	Western State	Unknown • Unknown	5–2	27–10	5–1

Postseason
District VII Playoff (4–1)

#	Date	Opponent	Site/stadium	Score	Overall record	GPAC record
38	May	Gonzaga	Jackson Field • Greeley, Colorado	6–3	28–10	4–0
39	May	Gonzaga	Jackson Field • Greeley, Colorado	0–12	28–11	4–0
40	May	Gonzaga	Jackson Field • Greeley, Colorado	6–2	29–11	4–0
41	May 31	Arizona	Jackson Field • Greeley, Colorado	6–5	30–11	4–0
42	June 1	Arizona	Jackson Field • Greeley, Colorado	6–2	31–11	4–0

College World Series (1–2)

#	Date	Opponent	Site/stadium	Score	Overall record	GPAC record
43	June 7	vs Oklahoma	Johnny Rosenblatt Stadium • Omaha, Nebraska	1–10	31–12	4–0
44	June 8	vs Harvard	Johnny Rosenblatt Stadium • Omaha, Nebraska	4–2	32–12	4–0
45	June 11	vs Southern Illinois	Johnny Rosenblatt Stadium • Omaha, Nebraska	3–5	32–13	4–0

== Awards and honors ==
Bob DeMeo

- All-Great Plains Athletic Conference Team
- Third Team All-American American Baseball Coaches Association

Ron Holmes

- All-Great Plains Athletic Conference Team

Denny Leonida

- All-Great Plains Athletic Conference Team
