= 1974 Texas Longhorns baseball team =

Baseball team representing University of Texas at Austin

1974 Texas Longhorns baseball

SWC champions

College World Series, 2–2
- Conference: Southwest Conference
- Record: 54–8 (20–4 SWC)
- Head coach: Cliff Gustafson (7th year)
- Home stadium: Clark Field

1974 Southwest Conference baseball standings
	Conf.				Overall
Team	W		L	PCT	W		L	PCT
No. 4 Texas ‍†‍‍^{y}	20	–	4	.833	54	–	8	.871
No. 21 Texas A&M ‍‍‍	17	–	7	.708	31	–	13	.705
No. 22 TCU ‍‍‍	14	–	10	.583	31	–	17	.646
Rice ‍‍‍	12	–	11	.522	24	–	18	.571
Baylor ‍‍‍	12	–	11	.522	24	–	18	.571
Houston ‍‍‍	10	–	13	.435	20	–	21	.488
Arkansas ‍‍‍	9	–	15	.375	22	–	21	.512
Texas Tech ‍‍‍	9	–	15	.375	11	–	22	.333
SMU ‍‍‍	4	–	20	.167	16	–	26	.381
† – Conference champion y – Invited to the NCAA tournament As of June 30, 1974; Rankings from Collegiate Baseball

The 1974 Texas Longhorns baseball team represented the University of Texas at Austin in the 1974 NCAA Division I baseball season. The Longhorns played their home games at Clark Field. The team was coached by Cliff Gustafson in his 7th season at Texas.

The Longhorns reached the College World Series, finishing fourth with wins over Seton Hall and Oklahoma and a pair of losses to eventual champion Southern California, first in the opening round and later in the semifinals.

== Personnel ==
=== Roster ===
1974 Texas Longhorns roster
Pitchers: 5 - Bobby Cuellar; 8 - Martin Flores; 21 - Jim Gideon; 24 - Rich Wortham; Catchers: 25 - Rick Bradley	Infielders: 3 - Keith Moreland; 22 - Mickey Reichenbach; Outfielders: 4 - Terry Pyka; 6 - Bobby Clark; 7 - Rick Burley; - David Reeves	Unknown: 9 - Blair Todd Stouffer; 12 - James Ray Brown; 13 - Thomas Henry Ball; 29 - Frosty Doyle R. Moore

== Schedule and results ==
Legend
Texas win
Texas loss
Tie

1974 Texas Longhorns baseball game log
Regular season

February
Date	Opponent	Site/stadium	Score	Overall record	SWC record
Feb 18	St. Mary's*	Clark Field • Austin, TX	W 11–3	1–0	
Feb 18	St. Mary's*	Clark Field • Austin, TX	W 11–8	2–0	
Feb 19	Trinity*	Clark Field • Austin, TX	W 9–1	3–0	
Feb 19	Trinity*	Clark Field • Austin, TX	W 13–5	4–0	
Feb 22	Sam Houston State*	Clark Field • Austin, TX	W 8–1	5–0	
Feb 22	Sam Houston State*	Clark Field • Austin, TX	W 9–1	6–0	
Feb 23	Sam Houston State*	Clark Field • Austin, TX	W 1–0	7–0	
Feb 23	Sam Houston State*	Clark Field • Austin, TX	W 15–2	8–0	
Feb 25	at Trinity*	San Antonio, TX	W 7–4	9–0	
Feb 25	at Trinity*	San Antonio, TX	W 6–1	10–0	
Feb 26	Texas Lutheran*	Clark Field • Austin, TX	W 17–2	11–0	
Feb 26	Texas Lutheran*	Clark Field • Austin, TX	W 10–3	12–0	

March
Date	Opponent	Site/stadium	Score	Overall record	SWC record
Mar 1	Houston	Clark Field • Austin, TX	W 8–7	13–0	1–0
Mar 2	Houston	Clark Field • Austin, TX	W 6–2	14–0	2–0
Mar 2	Houston	Clark Field • Austin, TX	W 20–3	15–0	3–0
Mar 5	at St. Mary's*	San Antonio, TX	W 12–0	16–0	
Mar 5	at St. Mary's*	San Antonio, TX	W 1–0	17–0	
Mar 8	at Rice	Houston, TX	L 4–5	17–1	3–1
Mar 9	at Rice	Houston, TX	W 3–2	18–1	4–1
Mar 9	at Rice	Houston, TX	W 4–1	19–1	5–1
Mar 12	at Texas Lutheran*	Seguin, TX	W 3–0	20–1	
Mar 12	at Texas Lutheran*	Seguin, TX	W 13–1	21–1	
Mar 15	at Texas Tech	Lubbock, TX	L 3–5	21–2	5–2
Mar 16	at Texas Tech	Lubbock, TX	W 5–0	22–2	6–2
Mar 16	at Texas Tech	Lubbock, TX	W 16–1	23–2	7–2
Mar 22	SMU	Clark Field • Austin, TX	W 18–3	24–2	8–2
Mar 23	SMU	Clark Field • Austin, TX	W 6–5	25–2	9–2
Mar 23	SMU	Clark Field • Austin, TX	W 22–5	26–2	10–2
Mar 26	Minnesota*	Clark Field • Austin, TX	W 7–4	27–2	
Mar 26	Minnesota*	Clark Field • Austin, TX	W 5–3	28–2	
Mar 29	at Arkansas	Washington County Fairgrounds • Fayetteville, AR	W 19–4	29–2	11–2
Mar 30	at Arkansas	Washington County Fairgrounds • Fayetteville, AR	W 3–2	30–2	12–2
Mar 30	at Arkansas	Washington County Fairgrounds • Fayetteville, AR	L 5–8	30–3	12–3

April
Date	Opponent	Site/stadium	Score	Overall record	SWC record
Apr 5	Baylor	Clark Field • Austin, TX	W 15–3	31–3	13–3
Apr 6	Baylor	Clark Field • Austin, TX	W 12–3	32–3	14–3
Apr 6	Baylor	Clark Field • Austin, TX	W 6–5	33–3	15–3
Apr 11	Southwestern Louisiana*	Clark Field • Austin, TX	W 9–3	34–3	
Apr 11	Southwestern Louisiana*	Clark Field • Austin, TX	W 24–8	35–3	
Apr 12	Southwestern Louisiana*	Clark Field • Austin, TX	W 5–1	36–3	
Apr 12	Southwestern Louisiana*	Clark Field • Austin, TX	W 4–3	37–3	
Apr 15	Lamar*	Clark Field • Austin, TX	W 5–4	38–3	
Apr 15	Lamar*	Clark Field • Austin, TX	W 8–1	39–3	
Apr 19	at TCU	TCU Diamond • Fort Worth, TX	W 5–2	40–3	16–3
Apr 20	at TCU	TCU Diamond • Fort Worth, TX	W 10–4	41–3	17–3
Apr 20	at TCU	TCU Diamond • Fort Worth, TX	W 8–2	42–3	18–3
Apr 26	Texas A&M	Clark Field • Austin, TX	L 5–11	42–4	18–4
Apr 27	Texas A&M	Clark Field • Austin, TX	W 8–0	43–4	19–4
Apr 27	Texas A&M	Clark Field • Austin, TX	W 4–3	44–4	20–4

May
Date	Opponent	Site/stadium	Score	Overall record	SWC record
May 4	Southwestern*	Clark Field • Austin, TX	W 5–4	45–4	
May 4	Southwestern*	Clark Field • Austin, TX	W 10–2	46–4	
May 16	Lubbock Christian*	Clark Field • Austin, TX	L 1–5	46–5	
May 16	Lubbock Christian*	Clark Field • Austin, TX	W 6–0	47–5	
May 17	Lubbock Christian*	Clark Field • Austin, TX	W 8–2	48–5	
May 17	Lubbock Christian*	Clark Field • Austin, TX	W 11–6	49–5	

Postseason

District 6 playoffs
Date	Opponent	Site/stadium	Score	Overall record	NCAAT record
May 24	Texas–Pan American	Arlington, TX	W 7–0	50–5	1–0
May 26	Louisiana Tech	Arlington, TX	L 4–5	50–6	1–1
May 27	Louisiana Tech	Arlington, TX	W 8–0	51–6	2–1
	Louisiana Tech	Arlington, TX	W 12–2	52–6	3–1

College World Series
Date	Opponent	Site/stadium	Score	Overall record	CWS record
June 8	Southern California	Johnny Rosenblatt Stadium • Omaha, NE	L 2–9	52–7	0–1
June 10	Seton Hall	Johnny Rosenblatt Stadium • Omaha, NE	W 12–2	53–7	1–1
June 11	Oklahoma	Johnny Rosenblatt Stadium • Omaha, NE	W 10–4	54–7	2–1
June 14	Southern California	Johnny Rosenblatt Stadium • Omaha, NE	L 3–5	54–8	2–2
