= 1974 ACC tournament =

1974 ACC tournament may refer to:

- 1974 ACC men's basketball tournament
- 1974 Atlantic Coast Conference baseball tournament
