= 1992 Oklahoma Sooners baseball team =

American college baseball season

1992 Oklahoma Sooners baseball

NCAA Mideast Regional champions

College World Series, 1–2
- Conference: Big Eight Conference
- Record: 43–24 (17–7 Big Eight)
- Head coach: Larry Cochell (2nd year)
- Home stadium: L. Dale Mitchell Baseball Park

1992 Big Eight Conference baseball standings
	Conf.				Overall
Team	W		L	PCT	W		L	PCT
No. 13 Oklahoma State ‍†‍‡‍^{y}	17	–	7	.708	49	–	16	.754
No. 6 Oklahoma ‍†‍‍^{y}	17	–	7	.708	43	–	24	.642
Missouri ‍‍‍	12	–	12	.500	34	–	22	.607
Iowa State ‍‍‍	11	–	13	.458	33	–	23	.589
Nebraska ‍‍‍	11	–	13	.458	31	–	25	.554
Kansas State ‍‍‍	8	–	16	.333	28	–	28	.500
Kansas ‍‍‍	8	–	16	.333	25	–	28	.472
† – Conference champion ‡ – Tournament champion y – Invited to the NCAA tournament As of June 30, 1992; Rankings from Collegiate Baseball

The 1992 Oklahoma Sooners baseball team represented the University of Oklahoma in the 1992 NCAA Division I baseball season. The Sooners played their home games at L. Dale Mitchell Baseball Park, and played as part of the Big Eight Conference. The team was coached by Larry Cochell in his second season as head coach at Oklahoma.

The Sooners reached the College World Series, their seventh appearance in Omaha, where they finished tied for 5th place after a win against Wichita State and a pair of losses to eventual semifinalist Texas.

== Personnel ==
=== Roster ===
1992 Oklahoma Sooners roster
Pitchers: - Cale Gundy; 7 - Brett Kemohah; 21 - Casey Mendenhall; 22 - Tim Gower; 23 - Rick Bennett; 28 - Kevin Lovinger; 34 - Mike Smedes; 36 - Zach Krislock; 38 - Scott Moore; 39 - Clifton Foster; 42 - Damon Gardner	Catchers: 10 - Tim Cossins; 15 - Darby Carmichael; 20 - Kevin Schula; Outfielders: 0 - Drew Christmon; 4 - Scott Marr; 5 - Jerry Whittaker; 8 - Britt Bonneau; 16 - Craig Cochell; 25 - Byron Matthews	Infielders: 3 - Tom Szymanski; 6 - Jason Evans; 9 - Matt Burke; 11 - Brian Eldridge; 17 - Rich Hills; 12 - Ben Jenkins; 18 - Greg Norton; 19 - Duane Stelly; 27 - Kerby Smith

=== Coaches ===
1992 Oklahoma Sooners baseball coaching staff
- - Larry Cochell - Head coach - 2nd Season
- - Sunny Golloway - Assistant coach - 1st season

== Schedule and results ==
Legend
Oklahoma win
Oklahoma loss

1992 Oklahoma Sooners baseball game log
Regular season

February
Date	Opponent	Site/Stadium	Score	Overall Record	Big 8 Record
Feb 14	Southwestern Oklahoma State*	L. Dale Mitchell Baseball Park • Norman, OK	W 10–4	1–0	
Feb 15	Nebraska–Kearney*	L. Dale Mitchell Baseball Park • Norman, OK	W 7–0	2–0	
Feb 15	Nebraska–Kearney*	L. Dale Mitchell Baseball Park • Norman, OK	W 11–4	3–0	
Feb 16	Nebraska–Kearney*	L. Dale Mitchell Baseball Park • Norman, OK	W 8–7	4–0	
Feb 21	vs Washington*	Cohen Stadium • El Paso, TX {Team Casa Collegiate Classic)	W 19–10	5–0	
Feb 22	vs Michigan State*	Cohen Stadium • El Paso, TX {Team Casa Collegiate Classic)	L 7–8	5–1	
Feb 22	vs New Mexico*	Cohen Stadium • El Paso, TX {Team Casa Collegiate Classic)	L 0–5	5–2	
Feb 23	vs New Mexico State*	Cohen Stadium • El Paso, TX {Team Casa Collegiate Classic)	W 10–9	6–2	
Feb 28	Missouri Southern*	L. Dale Mitchell Baseball Park • Norman, OK	W 11–6	7–2	
Feb 29	Eastern Illinois*	L. Dale Mitchell Baseball Park • Norman, OK	W 5–3	8–2	
Feb 29	Eastern Illinois*	L. Dale Mitchell Baseball Park • Norman, OK	W 15–6	9–2	

March
Date	Opponent	Site/Stadium	Score	Overall Record	Big 8 Record
Mar 1	Eastern Illinois*	L. Dale Mitchell Baseball Park • Norman, OK	W 15–5	10–2	
Mar 5	South Dakota State*	L. Dale Mitchell Baseball Park • Norman, OK	W 22–2	11–2	
Mar 6	at South Alabama*	Eddie Stanky Field • Mobile, AL	L 5–7	11–3	
Mar 7	vs Auburn*	Eddie Stanky Field • Mobile, AL	W 6–3	12–3	
Mar 8	at South Alabama*	Eddie Stanky Field • Mobile, AL	W 11–10	13–3	
Mar 10	at Texas*	Disch–Falk Field • Austin, TX	L 2–3	13–4	
Mar 11	at Texas*	Disch–Falk Field • Austin, TX	L 10–11	13–5	
Mar 13	Ole Miss*	L. Dale Mitchell Baseball Park • Norman, OK	L 8–11	13–6	
Mar 14	at Rice*	Cameron Field • Houston, TX	W 10–3	14–6	
Mar 15	at Rice*	Cameron Field • Houston, TX	L 3–4	14–7	
Mar 17	Southwest Texas State*	L. Dale Mitchell Baseball Park • Norman, OK	L 4–7	14–8	
Mar 18	Southwest Texas State*	L. Dale Mitchell Baseball Park • Norman, OK	L 9–15	14–9	
Mar 20	Central Michigan*	L. Dale Mitchell Baseball Park • Norman, OK	W 7–1	15–9	
Mar 21	Central Michigan*	L. Dale Mitchell Baseball Park • Norman, OK	W 10–3	16–9	
Mar 21	Central Michigan*	L. Dale Mitchell Baseball Park • Norman, OK	W 5–4	17–9	
Mar 23	Central Oklahoma*	L. Dale Mitchell Baseball Park • Norman, OK	W 15–4	18–9	
Mar 27	at Kansas State	KSU Baseball Stadium • Manhattan, KS	W 5–0	19–9	1–0
Mar 28	at Kansas State	KSU Baseball Stadium • Manhattan, KS	W 11–2	20–9	2–0
Mar 28	at Kansas State	KSU Baseball Stadium • Manhattan, KS	W 7–2	21–9	3–0
Mar 29	at Kansas State	KSU Baseball Stadium • Manhattan, KS	L 2–7	21–10	3–1
Mar 31	vs Texas*	All Sports Stadium • Oklahoma City, OK	L 2–6	21–11	

April
Date	Opponent	Site/Stadium	Score	Overall Record	Big 8 Record
Apr 3	at Iowa State	Cap Timm Field • Ames, IA	W 14–1	22–11	4–1
Apr 4	at Iowa State	Cap Timm Field • Ames, IA	L 2–4	22–12	4–2
Apr 4	at Iowa State	Cap Timm Field • Ames, IA	W 8–0	23–12	5–2
Apr 5	at Iowa State	Cap Timm Field • Ames, IA	W 5–1	24–12	6–2
Apr 7	at TCU*	TCU Diamond • Fort Worth, TX	L 5–8	24–13	
Apr 10	Missouri	L. Dale Mitchell Baseball Park • Norman, OK	W 8–4	25–13	7–2
Apr 11	Missouri	L. Dale Mitchell Baseball Park • Norman, OK	W 11–7	26–13	8–2
Apr 11	Missouri	L. Dale Mitchell Baseball Park • Norman, OK	L 4–6	26–14	8–3
Apr 12	Missouri	L. Dale Mitchell Baseball Park • Norman, OK	L 4–5	26–15	8–4
Apr 14	at Wichita State*	Eck Stadium • Wichita, KS	W 3–2	27–15	
Apr 17	at Kansas	Quigley Field • Lawrence, KS	W 10–4	28–15	9–4
Apr 18	at Kansas	Quigley Field • Lawrence, KS	W 6–0	29–15	10–4
Apr 18	at Kansas	Quigley Field • Lawrence, KS	W 7–5	30–15	11–4
Apr 19	at Kansas	Quigley Field • Lawrence, KS	L 3–15	30–16	11–5
Apr 21	Wichita State*	L. Dale Mitchell Baseball Park • Norman, OK	L 2–4	30–17	
Apr 24	vs Oklahoma State	Drillers Stadium • Tusla, OK	W 4–1	31–17	12–5
Apr 25	Oklahoma State	L. Dale Mitchell Baseball Park • Norman, OK	L 9–18	31–18	12–6
Apr 26	vs Oklahoma State	All Sports Stadium • Oklahoma City, OK	W 5–4	32–18	13–6
Apr 27	at Oklahoma State	Allie P. Reynolds Stadium • Stillwater, OK	W 6–4	33–18	14–6

May
Date	Opponent	Site/Stadium	Score	Overall Record	Big 8 Record
May 10	Nebraska	L. Dale Mitchell Baseball Park • Norman, OK	W 15–5	34–18	15–6
May 11	Nebraska	L. Dale Mitchell Baseball Park • Norman, OK	L 5–7	34–19	15–7
May 11	Nebraska	L. Dale Mitchell Baseball Park • Norman, OK	W 12–4	35–19	16–7
May 12	Nebraska	L. Dale Mitchell Baseball Park • Norman, OK	W 11–6	36–19	17–7

Postseason

Big Eight Tournament
Date	Opponent	Site/Stadium	Score	Overall Record	Big 8T Record
May 15	Iowa State	All Sports Stadium • Oklahoma City, OK	W 5–1	37–19	1–0
May 16	Oklahoma State	All Sports Stadium • Oklahoma City, OK	W 15–6	38–19	2–0
May 17	Oklahoma State	All Sports Stadium • Oklahoma City, OK	L 2–3	38–20	2–1
May 17	Oklahoma State	All Sports Stadium • Oklahoma City, OK	L 5–13	38–21	2–2

NCAA Mideast Regional
Date	Opponent	Seed	Site/Stadium	Score	Overall Record	Reg Record
May 21	(4) UCLA	(3)	Dudy Noble Field • Starkville, MS	W 4–3	39–21	1–0
May 22	(2) Mississippi State	(3)	Dudy Noble Field • Starkville, MS	L 6–9	39–22	1–1
May 23	(1) Clemson	(3)	Dudy Noble Field • Starkville, MS	W 7–6	40–22	2–1
May 23	(2) Mississippi State	(3)	Dudy Noble Field • Starkville, MS	W 10–6	41–22	3–1
May 24	(4) UCLA	(3)	Dudy Noble Field • Starkville, MS	W 10–0	42–22	4–1

College World Series
Date	Opponent	Seed	Site/Stadium	Score	Overall Record	CWS Record
May 30	(3) Texas	(6)	Johnny Rosenblatt Stadium • Omaha, NE	L 3–15	42–23	0–1
June 1	(2) Wichita State	(6)	Johnny Rosenblatt Stadium • Omaha, NE	W 8–4	43–23	1–1
June 2	Texas	(6)	Johnny Rosenblatt Stadium • Omaha, NE	L 5–8	43–24	1–2
