= 1974 Seton Hall Pirates baseball team =

American college baseball season

1974 Seton Hall Pirates baseball

Metro Conference champions District II champions

College World Series, T-7th
- Conference: Metropolitan Intercollegiate Conference
- Record: 33–10–1 (14–2 Metro)
- Head coach: Mike Sheppard (2nd season)
- Assistant coaches: William Murphy; Ollie Mitchell
- Home stadium: Owen T. Carroll Field

1974 Metropolitan Intercollegiate Conference baseball standings
	Conf.						Overall
Team	W		L		PCT		W	L		PCT
No. 8 Seton Hall ‍†‍‍^{y}	14	–	2	–	0	.875		33	–	10	–	1	.761
Fairleigh Dickinson ‍‍‍	12	–	4	–	0	.750		22	–	9	–	0	.710
C. W. Post ‍‍‍	11	–	5	–	0	.688		21	–	9	–	0	.700
LIU ‍‍‍	10	–	6	–	0	.625		17	–	13	–	0	.567
Iona ‍‍‍	7	–	9	–	0	.438		10	–	13	–	0	.435
Manhattan ‍‍‍	6	–	10	–	0	.375		9	–	12	–	0	.429
Wagner ‍‍‍	2	–	13	–	0	.133		6	–	15	–	0	.286
CCNY ‍‍‍	2	–	13	–	0	.133		2	–	19	–	0	.095
St. Francis (NY) ‍‍‍	0	–	0	–	0	–		8	–	12	–	0	.400
† – Conference champion y – Invited to the NCAA tournament As of June 17, 1974; Rankings from Collegiate Baseball

The 1974 Seton Hall Pirates baseball team represented Seton Hall University in the 1974 NCAA Division I baseball season. The Pirates played their home games at Owen T. Carroll Field. The team was coached by Mike Sheppard in his 2nd year as head coach at Seton Hall.

The Pirates won the District II Playoff to advance to the College World Series, where they were defeated by the Texas Longhorns.

== Roster ==
1974 Seton Hall Pirates baseball team
Players
Coaches

#	Pos.	Name	B/T	Height	Weight	Year	Home town
	INF	Rico Bellini (C)	R/R	5 ft 11 in (1.8 m)	162 lb (73 kg)	Jr	New York, New York
	INF	Ed Blankmeyer	L/R	5 ft 9 in (1.75 m)	160 lb (73 kg)	So	Glen Cove, New York
	RHP	Vinnie Byron	R/R	6 ft 2 in (1.88 m)	210 lb (95 kg)	Fr	Newark, New Jersey
	RHP	Marty Caffery (C)	R/R	6 ft 1 in (1.85 m)	190 lb (86 kg)	Sr	South Orange, New Jersey
	C	Rick Cerone	R/R	5 ft 11 in (1.8 m)	190 lb (86 kg)	So	Newark, New Jersey
	INF	Richard Cimirro	R/R	6 ft 4 in (1.93 m)	245 lb (111 kg)	Jr	Maplewood, New Jersey
	INF	Mark Costello	R/R	5 ft 7 in (1.7 m)	150 lb (68 kg)	Jr	Glen Head, New York
	OF	Jack Cust	R/R	6 ft 2 in (1.88 m)	199 lb (90 kg)	Sr	Trenton, New Jersey
	RHP	Ted Czech	R/R	6 ft 2 in (1.88 m)	210 lb (95 kg)	Jr	Rutherford, New Jersey
	OF	James DeLibero	R/R	6 ft 1 in (1.85 m)	180 lb (82 kg)	Fr	Nutley, New Jersey
	LHP	Charles Douress	L/L	6 ft 1 in (1.85 m)	167 lb (76 kg)	Jr	Bricktown, New Jersey
	INF	Joe Gallo	R/R	5 ft 1 in (1.55 m)	160 lb (73 kg)	Sr	Hollis, New York
	RHP	Len Glowzenski	R/R	6 ft 3 in (1.91 m)	195 lb (88 kg)	So	Middletown, New Jersey
		Todd Heimer	L/L	6 ft 4 in (1.93 m)	215 lb (98 kg)	Fr	Glen Head, New York
	OF	Bob Hemsworth	R/R	5 ft 11 in (1.8 m)	175 lb (79 kg)	So	New York, New York
	OF	Greg Jamison	L/R	6 ft 0 in (1.83 m)	160 lb (73 kg)	So	Coatesville, Pennsylvania
	OF	Tom Kober	L/R	6 ft 0 in (1.83 m)	170 lb (77 kg)	Jr	New York, New York
	RHP	Fred Kopecki	R/R	6 ft 1 in (1.85 m)	165 lb (75 kg)	Fr	Arlington, New Jersey
	RHP	David Lombardi	R/R	6 ft 2 in (1.88 m)	185 lb (84 kg)	So	Bergenfield, New Jersey
	C	Mike O'Connor	L/R	5 ft 11 in (1.8 m)	186 lb (84 kg)	Fr	Madison, New Jersey
	LHP	Jim McDonough	L/L	5 ft 10 in (1.78 m)	165 lb (75 kg)	Fr	Short Hills, New Jersey
	RHP	Charlie Puleo	R/R	6 ft 2 in (1.88 m)	180 lb (82 kg)	Fr	Bloomfield, New Jersey
	INF	Anthony Roselle	R/R	5 ft 11 in (1.8 m)	162 lb (73 kg)	Jr	Paterson, New Jersey
	INF	Michael Rota	R/R	5 ft 10 in (1.78 m)	170 lb (77 kg)	Fr	Newark, New Jersey
	OF	Ted Schoenhaus	R/R	6 ft 0 in (1.83 m)	175 lb (79 kg)	Jr	Bloomfield, New Jersey
		Ricky Sposta	L/L	5 ft 7 in (1.7 m)	155 lb (70 kg)	Jr	Little Falls, New York
	RHP	Robert Swain	R/R	5 ft 11 in (1.8 m)	178 lb (81 kg)	Jr	New York, New York
	RHP	Ken Sosnowski	R/R	5 ft 10 in (1.78 m)	170 lb (77 kg)	Fr	Carteret, New Jersey
	OF	Frank Tracey	R/R	5 ft 10 in (1.78 m)	190 lb (86 kg)	Sr	Montclair, New Jersey
	LHP	Joe Trotter	R/L	6 ft 1 in (1.85 m)	190 lb (86 kg)	Jr	Carlstadt, New Jersey
	RHP	Michael Zayac	R/R	6 ft 1 in (1.85 m)	160 lb (73 kg)	So	Newark, New Jersey

Head coach

Mike Sheppard

Assistant coach(es)

William Murphy
Ollie Mitchell

Legend

- (C) Team captain
- (S) Suspended
- (I) Ineligible
- Injured
- Current redshirt

== Schedule ==
1974 Seton Hall Pirates baseball game log
Regular season
March (6–9)

#	Date	Opponent	Site/stadium	Score	Overall record	Metro record
1	March 18	at Miami (FL)	Mark Light Field • Coral Gables, Florida	3–4	0–1	–
2	March 20	vs Michigan State	Mark Light Field • Coral Gables, Florida	10–6	1–1	–
3	March 20	at Miami (FL)	Mark Light Field • Coral Gables, Florida	2–6	1–2	–
4	March 21	vs Ohio State	Mark Light Field • Coral Gables, Florida	4–8	1–3	–
5	March 22	vs Michigan State	Mark Light Field • Coral Gables, Florida	6–20	1–4	–
6	March 22	vs Buffalo	Mark Light Field • Coral Gables, Florida	9–4	2–4	–
7	March 23	vs Ohio State	Mark Light Field • Coral Gables, Florida	7–6	3–4	–
8	March	vs Lafayette	Unknown • Unknown	10–2	4–4	–
9	March 28	at Rutgers	Bainton Field • Piscataway, New Jersey	12–6	5–4	–

April (16–2)

#	Date	Opponent	Site/stadium	Score	Overall record	Metro record
10	April 1	St. Peter's	Owen T. Carroll Field • South Orange, New Jersey	11–0	6–4	–
11	April	Buffalo	Unknown • Unknown	0–5	6–5	–
12	April	Buffalo	Unknown • Unknown	2–1	7–5	–
13	April	LIU Brooklyn	Unknown • Unknown	5–2	8–5	1–0
14	April	Monmouth	Unknown • Unknown	6–1	9–5	1–0
15	April	Iona	Unknown • Unknown	11–10	10–5	2–0
16	April	Rider	Unknown • Unknown	5–4	11–5	2–0
17	April	C. W. Post	Unknown • Unknown	3–2	12–5	3–0
18	April	Wagner	Unknown • Unknown	13–3	13–5	4–0
19	April 18	Rutgers	Owen T. Carroll Field • South Orange, New Jersey	1–0	14–5	4–0
20	April	St. Francis (NY)	Unknown • Unknown	11–1	15–5	5–0
21	April	Fairleigh Dickinson	Unknown • Unknown	3–2	16–5	6–0
22	April	Manhattan	Unknown • Unknown	11–1	17–5	7–0
23	April 25	St. John's	Owen T. Carroll Field • South Orange, New Jersey	0–4	17–6	7–0
24	April 26	Wagner	Unknown • Unknown	17–0	18–6	8–0
25	April 27	Fairleigh Dickinson	Unknown • Unknown	9–7	19–6	9–0
26	April 28	Montclair State	Unknown • Unknown	8–3	20–6	9–0
27	April	NYU	Unknown • Unknown	7–0	21–6	9–0

May (9–2–1)

#	Date	Opponent	Site/stadium	Score	Overall record	Metro record
28	May	LIU Brooklyn	Unknown • Unknown	7–4	22–6	10–0
29	May	Army	Unknown • Unknown	12–2	23–6	10–0
30	May	CCNY	Unknown • Unknown	8–9	23–7	10–1
31	May 5	at Villanova	McGeehan Field • Villanova, Pennsylvania	8–9	24–7	10–1
32	May	Iona	Unknown • Unknown	14–9	25–7	11–1
33	May	CCNY	Unknown • Unknown	26–4	26–7	12–1
34	May	C. W. Post	Unknown • Unknown	5–7	26–8	12–2
35	May	St. Francis (NY)	Unknown • Unknown	4–3	27–8	13–2
36	May	Fordham	Unknown • Unknown	7–2	28–8	13–2
37	May	Manhattan	Unknown • Unknown	6–0	29–8	14–2
38	May	Upsala	Unknown • Unknown	8–2	30–8	14–2
39	May	Princeton	Unknown • Unknown	0–0	30–8–1	14–2

Postseason
NCAA District II Playoff (3–0)

#	Date	Opponent	Site/stadium	Score	Overall record	Metro record
40	May 24	vs Penn State	Unknown • West Windsor, New Jersey	4–1	31–8–1	14–2
41	May 25	vs Saint Joseph's	Unknown • West Windsor, New Jersey	4–3	32–8–1	14–2
42	May	St. John's	Unknown • West Windsor, New Jersey	11–8	33–8–1	14–2

College World Series (0–2)

#	Date	Opponent	Site/stadium	Score	Overall record	Metro record
43	June 8	vs Southern Illinois	Omaha Municipal Stadium • Omaha, Nebraska	1–5	33–9–1	14–2
44	June 10	vs Texas	Omaha Municipal Stadium • Omaha, Nebraska	2–12	33–10–1	14–2
