= 1974 Atlantic Coast Conference baseball tournament =

American college baseball tournament

- Teams: 7
- Format: Seven-team double-elimination tournament
- Finals site: Doak Field; Raleigh, North Carolina
- Champions: NC State (2nd title)
- Winning coach: Sam Esposito (2nd title)
- Attendance: 13,800

1974 Atlantic Coast Conference baseball standings
	Conf.				Overall
Team	W		L	PCT	W		L	PCT
Clemson ‍†‍‍	10	–	1	.909	23	–	15	.605
North Carolina ‍‍‍	9	–	3	.750	22	–	8	.733
NC State ‍‍‡‍^{y}	7	–	5	.583	22	–	12	.647
Maryland ‍‍‍	6	–	6	.500	11	–	17	.393
Virginia ‍‍‍	6	–	6	.500	21	–	17	.553
Duke ‍‍‍	3	–	8	.273	9	–	16	.360
Wake Forest ‍‍‍	0	–	12	.000	8	–	20	.286
† – Conference champion ‡ – Tournament champion y – Invited to the NCAA tournament As of June 30, 1974; Rankings from Collegiate Baseball

The 1974 Atlantic Coast Conference baseball tournament was held in Raleigh, North Carolina, from April 25 through 28. NC State won the tournament and earned the Atlantic Coast Conference's automatic bid to the 1974 NCAA Division I baseball tournament.

== Tournament ==
Play-In Rd. (Single Elim.)	Upper round 2	Upper final	Championship
5	Virginia	3
1	Clemson	2
4	Maryland	0
5	Virginia	6
3	NC State	3
5	Virginia	1
6	Duke	6
3	NC State	7
2	North Carolina	2
3	NC State	4
7	Wake Forest	4
2	North Carolina	5
3	NC State	5	8
1	Clemson	12	6
Lower round 1	Lower final
1	Clemson	9
2	North Carolina	4	5	Virginia	6
1	Clemson	6

== See also ==
- College World Series
- NCAA Division I Baseball Championship
