= Wayne Krenchicki =

American baseball player (1954–2018)

- Third baseman
- Born: September 17, 1954; Trenton, New Jersey, U.S.
- Died: October 16, 2018 (aged 64); Pittsfield, Illinois, U.S.
- Batted: Left Threw: Right

MLB debut
- June 15, 1979, for the Baltimore Orioles

Last MLB appearance
- September 22, 1986, for the Montreal Expos

MLB statistics
- Batting average: .266
- Home runs: 15
- Runs batted in: 124
- Stats at Baseball Reference

Teams
- Baltimore Orioles (1979–1981); Cincinnati Reds (1982–1983); Detroit Tigers (1983); Cincinnati Reds (1984–1985); Montreal Expos (1986)
Medals
Men's baseball
Representing United States
Baseball World Cup
Gold medal – first place	1973 Central America	Team
Pan American Games
Silver medal – second place	1975 Mexico City	Team

Wayne Richard Krenchicki (September 17, 1954 – October 16, 2018) was an American Major League Baseball (MLB) third baseman. He played all or parts of eight seasons in the majors from 1979 until 1986. He was a past manager of the Evansville Otters of the independent Frontier League. He played college baseball at the University of Miami.

== Pre-MLB ==
Krenchicki grew up in Ewing Township, New Jersey, and graduated from Ewing High School in 1972. Krenchicki was selected by the Philadelphia Phillies in the eighth round (171st overall) of the 1972 MLB draft, shortly after his high school graduation. He opted to accept an athletic scholarship from the University of Miami where he majored in physical education. A three-year letterman from 1973 to 1975 with the Ron Fraser-coached Hurricanes, Krenchicki is considered the best shortstop in the program's history. The Hurricanes qualified for the NCAA Division I Baseball Championships in each of the three years he was with the ballclub, including as a runner-up in its College World Series debut in 1974. He finished his collegiate career with a .316 (198 of 626) batting average, .436 slugging percentage, 273 total bases, 35 doubles, 11 triples, six home runs and 67 stolen bases. He was inducted into the University of Miami Sports Hall of Fame in 1990.

Krenchicki appeared with the United States national baseball team at the Baseball World Cup in 1973 and the Pan American Games in 1975, winning a gold and silver medal respectively. He was also on the Boulder, Colorado team that won the National Baseball Congress World Series in 1975.

== Major league career ==
Krenchicki was the seventh player chosen overall by the Baltimore Orioles in the secondary phase of the January 1976 Major League Baseball draft. He made his major league debut with the Orioles in June 1979, then spending parts of the next two seasons with them. On August 7, 1981, he was sent to the minor leagues so the Orioles could call up prospect Cal Ripken Jr. Krenchicki said, "I didn't expect it to happen. I just don't care to be going back to Rochester. But they want to look at Cal... They still have to pay me. I guess I'll just stay in a hotel and go fishing every day."

Krenchicki was sent to the Cincinnati Reds on February 15, 1982, to complete a transaction from five days prior in which the Orioles had acquired Paul Moskau. That season, he backed up Johnny Bench at third base for the Reds, batting .283. Krenchicki was traded to the Detroit Tigers for Pat Underwood on June 30, 1983. His contract was sold back to the Reds just under five months later on November 21.

Over the next two seasons, Krenchicki returned to being the Reds backup at third base, behind Nick Esasky in 1984 and Buddy Bell in 1985. He was traded to the Montreal Expos the following offseason, and in 1986 he played mostly at first base for the Expos, backing up Andrés Galarraga. After becoming a free agent at the end of the season, Krenchicki did not play in the majors again.

== Post-MLB ==
In 1989 and 1990, Krenchicki played in the Senior Professional Baseball Association. After the league folded, he was brought in by the Milwaukee Brewers organization. From 1991 until 1994, Krenchicki served as a minor league manager for the Brewers, in the Arizona Fall League in 1991, then for the Beloit Brewers of the Midwest League for the next three seasons.

In 1995, Krenchicki began managing in various independent minor leagues.

In 2007, he was hired by the independent Newark Bears of the Atlantic League and in his initial season won his first league championship. He managed the Newark Bears again in 2008 after which on December 16, 2008, he was named the manager of the Evansville Otters of the independent Frontier League.

Wayne Krenchicki died at age 64 on October 16, 2018.
