= 1974 NCAA Division I baseball tournament =

- Season: 1974
- Teams: 28
- Finals site: Johnny Rosenblatt Stadium; Omaha, NE
- Champions: Southern California (10th title)
- Runner-up: Miami (FL) (1st CWS Appearance)
- Winning coach: Rod Dedeaux (10th title)
- MOP: George Milke (Southern California)

The 1974 NCAA Division I baseball tournament was played at the end of the 1974 NCAA Division I baseball season to determine the national champion of college baseball. The tournament concluded with eight teams competing in the College World Series, a double-elimination tournament in its twenty-eighth year. Eight regional districts sent representatives to the College World Series with preliminary rounds within each district serving to determine each representative. These events would later become known as regionals. Each district had its own format for selecting teams, resulting in 28 teams participating in the tournament at the conclusion of their regular season, and in some cases, after a conference tournament. The twenty-eighth tournament's champion was Southern California, coached by Rod Dedeaux. The Most Outstanding Player was George Milke of Southern California.

== Tournament ==
The opening rounds of the tournament were played across eight district sites across the country, each consisting of between two and six teams. The winners of each District advanced to the College World Series.

Bold indicates winner.

=== District 1 at Cambridge, MA ===
Semifinals
**Harvard** | **2**
Providence | 1
**New Hampshire** | **2**
Providence | 1

Finals
**Harvard** | **10** | **6** | –
New Hampshire | 1 | 0 | –

=== District 2 at West Windsor, NJ ===
Upper round 1
**Saint Joseph's** | **4**
St. John's | 1
Penn State | 1
**Seton Hall** | **4**
Lower round 1
**St. John's** | **5***
Penn State | 4*

Upper final
Saint Joseph's | 3
**Seton Hall** | **4**
Lower final
**St. John's** | **8**
Saint Joseph's | 0

Final
**Seton Hall** | **11** | —
St. John's | 7 | —

=== District 3 at Starkville, MS ===
First round
1 | **South Carolina** | **9**
6 | NC State | 0
2 | **Miami (FL)** | **2**
5 | Georgia Southern | 1
3 | **Vanderbilt** | **2**
4 | East Carolina | 1

Second round
**South Carolina** | **5**
East Carolina | 1
**Miami (FL)** | **7**
Vanderbilt | 1
NC State | 1
**Georgia Southern** | **8**

Third round
South Carolina | 0
**Miami (FL)** | **5**
Vanderbilt | 3
**Georgia Southern** | **5**

Semifinals
**South Carolina** | **1**
Georgia Southern | 0

Final
**Miami (FL)** | 1 | **2**
South Carolina | **3** | 1

=== District 4 at Minneapolis, MN ===
Upper round 1
**Miami (OH)** | **3**
Cincinnati | 0
**Minnesota** | **9**
Southern Illinois | 4
Lower round 1
**Southern Illinois** | **6**
Cincinnati | 1

Upper final
Miami | 3
**Minnesota** | **4**
Lower final
**Southern Illinois** | **6***
Miami (OH) | 2*

Final
Minnesota | 2 | 3
**Southern Illinois** | **10** | **4**

=== District 5 at Oklahoma City, OK ===
| Finals |
| **Oklahoma** | **6** | **5** | — |
| Tulsa | 2 | 4 | — |

=== District 6 at Arlington, TX ===
Semifinals
**Louisiana Tech** | **3**
Texas–Pan American | 2
**Texas** | **7**
Texas–Pan American | 0

Finals
Louisiana Tech | **5** | 0 | 2
**Texas** | 4 | **8** | **12**

=== District 7 at Greeley, CO ===
| Semifinal | | | | Final |
| | | | | Arizona | 5 | 2 | — |
| **Northern Colorado** | **6** | 0 | **6** | **Northern Colorado** | **6** | **6** | — |
| Gonzaga | 3 | **12** | 2 |

=== District 8 at Los Angeles, CA ===
| Semifinal | | | | Final |
| | | | | Pepperdine | **4** | 1 | 1 |
| Cal State Los Angeles | 2 | **7** | 9 | **Southern California** | 2 | **4** | **12** |
| **Southern California** | **9** | 6 | **11** |

== College World Series ==
=== Participants ===
| School | Conference | Record (conference) | Head coach | CWS appearances | CWS best finish | CWS record |
|---|---|---|---|---|---|---|
| Harvard | EIBL | 28–9 (10–4) | Loyal Park | 3 (last: 1973) | 5th (1971) | 1–6 |
| Miami | Independent | 48–9 | Ron Fraser | 0 (last: none) | none | 0–0 |
| Northern Colorado | GPAC | 31–11 (–) | Tom Petroff | 9 (last: 1962) | 5th (1955) | 2–18 |
| Oklahoma | Big 8 | 42–6 (18–3) | Enos Semore | 3 (last: 1973) | 1st (1951) | 6–4 |
| Seton Hall | Metro | 33–8–1 (14–2) | Mike Sheppard | 2 (last: 1971) | 5th (1964) | 1–4 |
| Southern Illinois | Independent | 47–10 | Richard Jones | 3 (last: 1971) | 2nd (1968, 1971) | 6–6 |
| Texas | SWC | 52–6 (20–4) | Cliff Gustafson | 15 (last: 1973) | 1st (1949, 1950) | 30–27 |
| Southern California | Pac-8 | 45–19 (11–7) | Rod Dedeaux | 15 (last: 1973) | 1st (1948, 1958, 1961, 1963, 1968, 1970, 1971, 1972, 1973) | 53–18 |

=== Results ===
==== Bracket ====
Upper round 1
Miami | 4
Harvard | 1
Oklahoma | 10
Northern Colorado | 1
Southern California | 9
Texas | 2
Southern Illinois | 5
Seton Hall | 1

Upper round 2
Miami | 5
Oklahoma | 1
Southern California | 5
Southern Illinois | 3
Lower round 1
Harvard | 2
Northern Colorado | 4
Texas | 12
Seton Hall | 2

Upper final
Miami | 7
Southern California | 3
Lower round 2
Northern Colorado | 2
Southern Illinois | 5
Texas | 10
Oklahoma | 4

Semifinals
Miami | 3
Southern Illinois | 4
Southern California | 5
Texas | 3

Preliminary final
Southern Illinois | 2
Southern California | 7

Final
Miami | 3
Southern California | 7

==== Game results ====
| Date | Game | Winner | Score | Loser | Notes |
|---|---|---|---|---|---|
| June 7 | Game 1 | Miami | 4–1 | Harvard | |
| June 7 | Game 2 | Oklahoma | 10–1 | Northern Colorado | |
| June 8 | Game 3 | Southern California | 9–2 | Texas | |
| June 8 | Game 4 | Southern Illinois | 5–1 | Seton Hall | |
| June 10 | Game 5 | Northern Colorado | 4–2 | Harvard | Harvard eliminated |
| June 10 | Game 6 | Texas | 12–2 | Seton Hall | Seton Hall eliminated |
| June 10 | Game 7 | Miami | 5–1 | Oklahoma | |
| June 10 | Game 8 | Southern California | 5–3 | Southern Illinois | |
| June 11 | Game 9 | Southern Illinois | 5–2 | Northern Colorado | Northern Colorado eliminated |
| June 11 | Game 10 | Texas | 10–4 | Oklahoma | Oklahoma eliminated |
| June 12 | Game 11 | Miami | 7–3 | Southern California | |
| June 13 | Game 12 | Southern Illinois | 4–3 | Miami | |
| June 13 | Game 13 | Southern California | 5–3 | Texas | Texas eliminated |
| June 14 | Game 14 | Southern California | 7–2 | Southern Illinois | Southern Illinois eliminated |
| June 15 | Final | Southern California | 7–3 | Miami | Southern California wins CWS |

=== All-Tournament Team ===
The following players were members of the All-Tournament Team.

| Position | Player | School |
|---|---|---|
| P | Mark Barr | USC |
| P | Stan Jakubowski | Miami (FL) |
| P | George Milke (MOP) | USC |
| C | Ron Scott | Miami (FL) |
| 1B | Orlando Gonzalez | Miami (FL) |
| 2B | Rob Adolph | USC |
| 3B | Rich Dauer | USC |
| SS | Marvin Cobb | USC |
| OF | Tom Ball | Texas |
| OF | Bob Mitchell | USC |
| OF | Manny Trujillo | Miami (FL) |

=== Notable players ===
- Harvard:
- Miami (FL): Orlando Gonzalez, Wayne Krenchicki
- Northern Colorado: Tom Runnells, Joe Strain
- Oklahoma: Keith Drumright, Bob Shirley
- Seton Hall: Rick Cerone, Charlie Puleo
- Southern California: Rich Dauer, Steve Kemp, Dennis Littlejohn, Bobby Mitchell, Ed Putman, Pete Redfern
- Southern Illinois:
- Texas: Bobby Cuellar, Jim Gideon, Keith Moreland, Rich Wortham

== Tournament Notes ==
- Southern California becomes the first team to win five consecutive College World Series.
- Tom Petroff becomes the first head coach to lead two different schools to the College World Series; he led Rider University to Omaha in 1967.

== See also ==
- 1974 NCAA Division II baseball tournament
- 1974 NAIA World Series
