= 1974 USC Trojans baseball team =

American college baseball season

1974 USC Trojans baseball

National champions Pacific-8 Conference champions
- Conference: Pacific-8 Conference
- CB: No. 1
- Record: 50–20 (11–7 Pac-8)
- Head coach: Rod Dedeaux (33rd year)
- Home stadium: Dedeaux Field

1974 Pacific-8 Conference baseball standings
	Conf.				Overall
Team	W		L	PCT	W		L	PCT
Northern Division
Washington State ^{x}‍‍‍	14	–	4	.778	38	–	9	.809
No. 29 Oregon ‍‍‍	12	–	6	.667		–		–
Oregon State ‍‍‍	6	–	12	.333	16	–	23	.410
Washington ‍‍‍	5	–	12	.294	10	–	28	.263
Southern Division
No. 1 Southern California ^{x}‍‍‍^{y}	11	–	7	.611	50	–	20	.714
Stanford ‍‍‍	10	–	8	.556	28	–	19	.596
California ‍‍‍	8	–	10	.444	25	–	24	.510
UCLA ‍‍‍	7	–	11	.389	26	–	35	.426
x – Division champion y – Invited to the NCAA tournament As of June 30, 1974; Rankings from Collegiate Baseball

The 1974 USC Trojans baseball team represented the University of Southern California in the 1974 NCAA Division I baseball season. The team was coached by Rod Dedeaux in his 33rd season.

The Trojans won the College World Series, defeating the Miami Hurricanes in the championship game, completing their run of five consecutive national championships.

== Roster ==
1974 USC Trojans roster
Pitchers: Mark Barr; Scott Gregory; Brian Hueblein; Mike Jae; Russ McQueen; Ty Meyer; George Milke; Charlie Phillips; Jeff Racanelli; Pete Redfern; Jeff Reinke; Rich Simonin	Infielders: Rob Adoplh; Tom Bhagwat; Mark Carpenter; Ken Carrasco; Marvin Cobb; Rich Dauer; Larry Fobbs; Rob Hertel; Denny Martindale; Catchers: Larry Hill; Dennis Littlejohn; Ed Putnam; Bruce Tonascia	Outfielders: Anthony Davis; Cliff Holland; Ken Huizenga; Steve Kemp; Bob Mitchell; Dennis Stahl; Creighton Tevlin; Coaches: Rod Dedeaux

== Schedule ==
1974 USC Trojans baseball game log
Regular season
February

Date	Opponent	Score	Overall record	Pac-8 record
February 10	at Pepperdine	6–1	1–0	–
February 18	San Diego State	5–4	2–0	–
February 18	San Diego State	5–3	3–0	–
February 20	at Cal State Northridge	18–5	4–0	–
February 23	vs. Northern Arizona	5–1	5–0	–
February 24	at UNLV	9–7	6–0	–
February 24	at UNLV	10–2	7–0	–
February 26	LaVerne	9–2	8–0	–

March

Date	Opponent	Score	Overall record	Pac-8 record
March 1	UC Irvine	3–9	8–1	–
March 5	at Cal Poly Pomona	5–3	9–1	–
March 10	at Cal State Los Angeles	6–3	10–1	–
March 12	at UC Irvine	10–4	11–1	–
March 13	at Chapman	9–6	12–1	–
March 14	at Cal Poly	13–7	13–1	–
March 15	Air Force	19–3	14–1	–
March 15	Air Force	16–8	15–1	–
March 19	Santa Clara	8–6	16–1	–
March 20	Santa Clara	2–10	16–2	–
March 22	Arizona State	10–12	16–3	–
March 23	vs. Arizona State	14–9	17–3	–
March 25	at Loyola Marymount	6–3	18–3	–
March 26	Long Beach State	9–8	19–3	–
March 30	California	7–0	20–3	1–0
March 30	California	11–4	21–3	2–0
March 31	California	3–1	22–3	3–0

April

Date	Opponent	Score	Overall record	Pac-8 record
April 5	at Stanford	2–3	22–4	3–1
April 6	at Stanford	7–5	23–4	4–1
April 6	at Stanford	5–6	23–5	4–2
April 7	at Arizona State	6–4	24–5	–
April 9	at Oklahoma	6–7	24–6	–
April 9	at Oklahoma	4–5	24–7	–
April 12	at Tulsa	8–2	25–7	–
April 13	at Tulsa	4–5	25–8	–
April 13	at Tulsa	7–11	25–9	–
April 14	at Tulsa	11–4	26–9	–
April 15	Gonzaga	5–4	27–9	–
April 16	Cal State Northridge	7–6	28–9	–
April 19	at UCLA	8–2	29–9	5–2
April 20	UCLA	11–5	30–9	6–2
April 20	UCLA	6–5	31–9	7–2
April 23	Pepperdine	5–6	31–10	–
April 24	Westmont	9–6	32–10	–
April 26	at California	4–1	33–10	8–2
April 27	at California	2–4	33–11	8–3
April 27	at California	8–3	34–11	9–3
April 28	at Santa Clara	9–2	35–11	–
April 30	Cal Poly Pomona	4–6	35–12	–

May

Date	Opponent	Score	Overall record	Pac-8 record
May 3	Stanford	1–4	35–13	9–4
May 4	Stanford	0–7	35–14	9–5
May 4	Stanford	5–6	35–15	9–6
May 6	Chapman	5–2	36–15	–
May 7	Loyola Marymount	4–6	36–16	–
May 8	at Long Beach State	7–5	37–16	–
May 10	UCLA	10–0	38–16	10–6
May 11	at UCLA	5–6	38–17	10–7
May 11	at UCLA	22–2	39–17	11–7

Postseason
NCAA tournament: Pacific-8 playoffs

Date	Opponent	Site/stadium	Score	Overall record
May 18	vs. Oregon	Dedeaux Field	11–6	40–17
May 18	vs. Oregon	Dedeaux Field	14–1	41–17

NCAA tournament: District 8 playoffs

Date	Opponent	Site/stadium	Score	Overall record
May 25	vs. Cal State Los Angeles	Reeder Field	9–2	42–17
May 26	vs. Cal State Los Angeles	Reeder Field	6–7	42–18
May 26	vs. Cal State Los Angeles	Reeder Field	11–9	43–18
June 1	vs. Pepperdine	Dedeaux Field	2–4	43–19
June 2	vs. Pepperdine	Dedeaux Field	4–1	44–19
June 2	vs. Pepperdine	Dedeaux Field	12–1	45–19

NCAA tournament: College World Series

Date	Opponent	Site/stadium	Score	Overall record
June 8	vs. Texas	Rosenblatt Stadium	9–2	46–19
June 10	vs. Southern Illinois	Rosenblatt Stadium	5–3	47–19
June 12	vs. Miami (FL)	Rosenblatt Stadium	3–7	47–20
June 13	vs. Texas	Rosenblatt Stadium	5–3	48–20
June 14	vs. Southern Illinois	Rosenblatt Stadium	7–2	49–20
June 15	vs. Miami (FL)	Rosenblatt Stadium	7–3	50–20

== Awards and honors ==
Rob Adolph

- College World Series All-Tournament Team

Mike Barr

- College World Series All-Tournament Team

Marvin Cobb

- College World Series All-Tournament Team

Rich Dauer

- All-America First Team
- College World Series All-Tournament Team
- All-Pacific-8 First Team

Russ McQueen

- All-Pacific-8 First Team

George Milke

- College World Series Most Outstanding Player

Bob Mitchell

- College World Series All-Tournament Team

Creighton Tevlin

- All-Pacific-8 First Team

== Trojans in the 1974 MLB draft ==
The following members of the USC baseball program were drafted in the 1974 Major League Baseball draft.

=== June regular draft ===
Player	Position	Round	Overall	MLB Team
Rich Dauer	SS	1st	24th	Baltimore Orioles
Russ McQueen	RHP	14th	322nd	California Angels
Mark Barr	RHP	14th	332nd	Boston Red Sox
Anthony Davis	OF	15th	360th	Baltimore Orioles
Brian Heublein	LHP	19th	444th	Los Angeles Dodgers
Creighton Tevlin	OF	24th	539th	Baltimore Orioles
