= 1973 Amateur World Series (FEMBA) =

Tournament details
- Country: Nicaragua; Costa Rica; Honduras
- Teams: 11

Final positions
- Champions: United States
- Runners-up: Nicaragua
- Third place: Puerto Rico
- Fourth place: Colombia

The 1973 FEMBA Amateur World Series was organized by World Amateur Baseball Federation (FEMBA), a splinter organization from the International Baseball Federation (FIBA). The tournament, which ran from November 22 through December 5, 1973, was primarily held in Nicaragua, with some games also held in neighboring Honduras and Costa Rica. It was one of two international championships held in 1973, along with the FIBA tournament held in Cuba, amid a period of conflict between the two rival governing bodies of an international baseball.

Most games were held in various cities in Nicaragua (Masaya, Granada, León, and Chinandega); after opening the series in Granada, Costa Rica and Honduras played the rest of their games in San José and Tegucigalpa, respectively. The tournament saw the first international championship for the United States, which defeated Nicaragua in the championship game, an extra innings pitcher's duel between Rich Wortham and Dennis Martínez. It was also one of the first international tournaments to use the designated hitter, which had been adopted by the American League of Major League Baseball earlier that year.

The 1973 FEMBA AWS is retroactively recognized as the 22nd edition of the Amateur World Series ("Amateur World Series XXII"), while the Havana edition is recognized as the 21st; despite this, the Nicaragua tournament started and ended earlier that the one held in Havana.

== Venues ==
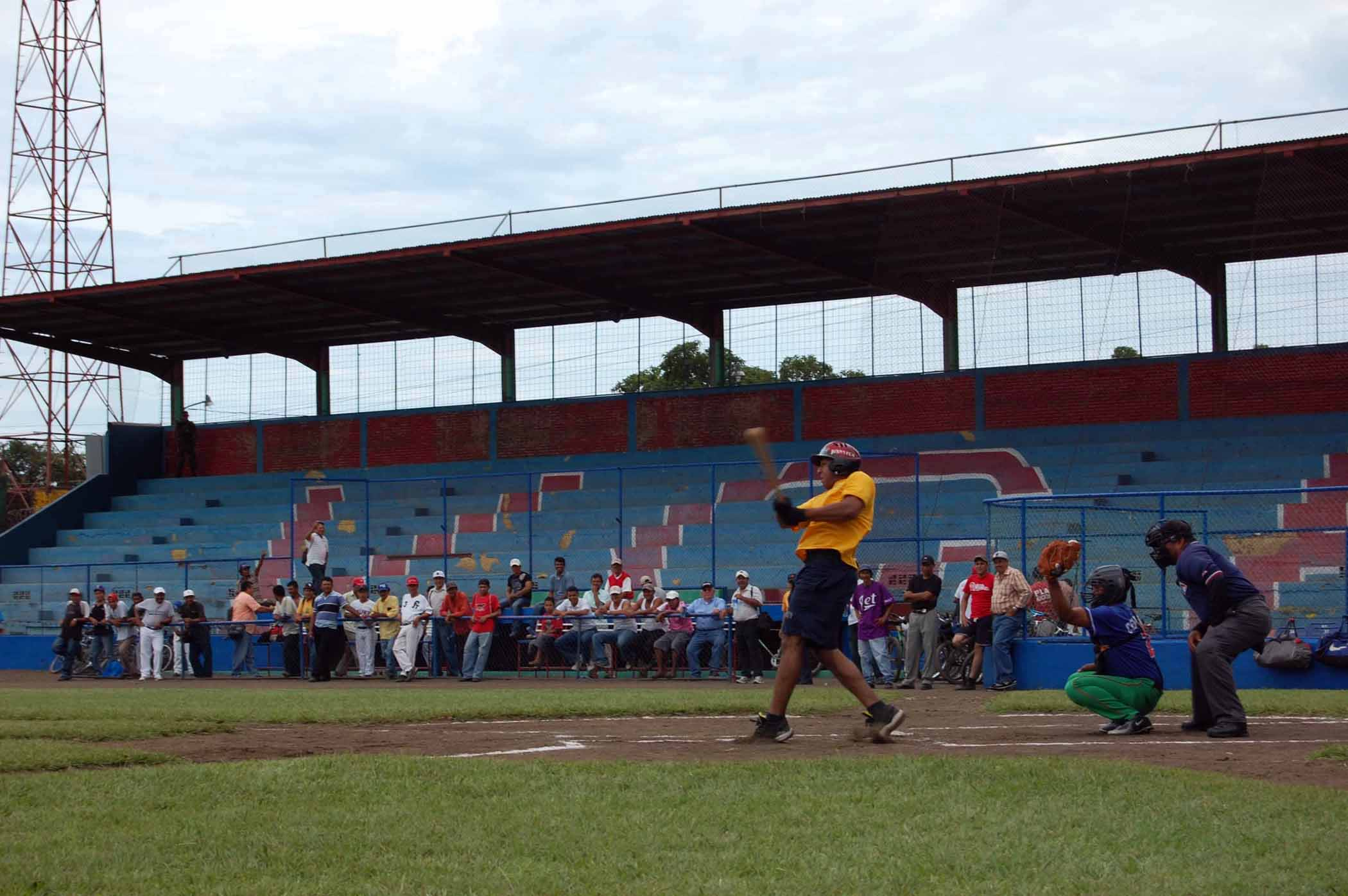
Games were played at the Estadio Efraín Tijerino in Chinandega

Games in Costa Rica were held at the Estadio Antonio Escarré in the capital of San José; in Honduras, they were held at the Parque de Pelota Lempira Reina Zepeda in Tegucigalpa. In Nicaragua, games were held at the Estadio Municipal Flor de Caña in Granada, the Estadio Roberto Clemente in Masaya, and the Estadio Efraín Tijerino in Chinandega. Nicaragua's largest stadium, the Estadio Nacional General Somoza in Managua, with a capacity of 40,000 spectators, was not used due to damage from the 1972 Nicaragua earthquake. This limited ticket sales, as the stadiums in Masaya, Granada, and Chinandega were limited to no more than 11,000 spectators. The final game was played in the Nicaraguan city of León.

== Teams ==
The United States was managed by college coach Ron Fraser, who had just steered the Netherlands to the 1973 European Championship. Colombia was piloted by Antonio Torres. Nicaragua was steered by Argelio Cordoba.

== Final standings ==
| Pos | Team | W | L |
|---|---|---|---|
| 1st place, gold medalist(s) | United States | 10 | 0 |
| 2nd place, silver medalist(s) | Nicaragua | 8 | 2 |
| 3rd place, bronze medalist(s) | Puerto Rico | 8 | 2 |
| 4 | Colombia | 8 | 2 |
| 5 | Chinese Taipei | 8 | 2 |
| 6 | Canada | 4 | 6 |
| 7 | Honduras | 4 | 6 |
| 8 | Costa Rica | 3 | 7 |
| 9 | Guatemala | 3 | 7 |
| 10 | Mexico | 1 | 9 |
| 11 | West Germany | 0 | 10 |

== Honors and awards ==
=== Statistical leaders ===
Leaders
| Statistic | Name | Total |
|---|---|---|
| Batting average | (Colombia) Luis Gaviria | .432 |
| Hits | (Colombia) Luis Gaviria | 19 |
| Runs | (United States) Orlando González | 12 |
| Home runs | (Puerto Rico) René Acevedo | 3 |
| Runs batted in | (Puerto Rico) René Acevedo | 11 |
| Stolen bases | (Taiwan) Hsie Ming-Yung | 11 |
| Slugging percentage | (Colombia) Luis Gaviria | .614 |
| Earned run average | (United States) Rich Wortham | 0.00 |

=== All-Star Team ===
| Position | Player |
|---|---|
| C | (United States) Danny Goodwin |
| 1B | (Colombia) Luis Gaviria |
| 2B | (Nicaragua) Gerson Jarquín |
| 3B | (United States) Jim Hacker |
| SS | (United States) Wayne Krenchicki |
| LF | (Guatemala) Jorge Cordero |
| CF | (Colombia) José Corpas |
| RF | (Taiwan) Hsieh Ming-Yung |
| DH | (Nicaragua) Pedro Selva |
| LHP | (United States) Rich Wortham |
| RHP | (Nicaragua) Julio Juarez |
