= 1974 Miami Hurricanes baseball team =

American college baseball season

1974 Miami Hurricanes baseball

District 3 champions

College World Series, Runner-Up
- Conference: Independent
- Record: 51–11
- Head coach: Ron Fraser (12th season)
- Home stadium: Mark Light Field

1974 NCAA Division I District 3 baseball independents standings
	Conf.				Overall
Team	W		L	PCT	W		L	PCT
No. 10 South Carolina ‍‍‍^{y}		–		–	48	–	8	.857
No. 2 Miami (FL) ‍‍‍^{y}		–		–	51	–	11	.823
South Alabama ‍‍‍		–		–	30	–	8	.789
No. 11 Georgia Southern ‍‍‍^{y}		–		–	47	–	14	.770
Stetson ‍‍‍		–		–	30	–	13	.698
Florida State ‍‍‍		–		–	37	–	25	.597
Marshall ‍‍‍		–		–	21	–	15	.583
South Florida ‍‍‍		–		–	21	–	16	.568
Georgia Tech ‍‍‍		–		–	20	–	17	.541
Virginia Tech ‍‍‍		–		–	15	–	15	.500
Mercer ‍‍‍		–		–	15	–	19	.441
Western Carolina ‍‍‍		–		–	11	–	14	.440
Georgetown ‍‍‍		–		–	7	–	11	.389
Jacksonville ‍‍‍		–		–	19	–	36	.345
y – Invited to the NCAA tournament As of June 30, 1974; Rankings from Collegiate Baseball

The 1974 Miami Hurricanes baseball team represented the University of Miami in the 1974 NCAA Division I baseball season. The Hurricanes played their home games at the original Mark Light Field. The team was coached by Ron Fraser in his 12th season at Miami.

The Hurricanes lost the College World Series, defeated by the USC Trojans in the championship game.

== Roster ==
1974 Miami Hurricanes roster
Pitchers: Dean Booth; Jerry Brust; Stan Jakubowski - Sophomnore	Catchers: Ron Scott - Junior; Infielders: Jim Crosta; 20 Orlando González - Senior	Outfielders: Manny Trujillo - Senior

== Schedule and results ==
Legend
Miami win
Miami loss
Miami tie

1974 Miami Hurricanes baseball game log
Regular season (44–8)
February (3–0)

Date	Opponent	Site/stadium	Score	Overall Record
February 22	Jacksonville	Mark Light Field • Coral Gables, Florida	3–2	1–0
February 23	Jacksonville	Mark Light Field • Coral Gables, Florida	9–8	2–0
February 27	Biscayne	Mark Light Field • Coral Gables, Florida	12–0	3–0

March (25–3)

Date	Opponent	Site/stadium	Score	Overall Record
March 1	Florida	Mark Light Field • Coral Gables, Florida	4–3	4–0
March 2	Florida	Mark Light Field • Coral Gables, Florida	6–9	4–1
March 3	Florida Tech	Mark Light Field • Coral Gables, Florida	3–0	5–1
March 3	Florida Tech	Mark Light Field • Coral Gables, Florida	1–7	5–2
March 5	Saint Joseph's	Mark Light Field • Coral Gables, Florida	9–2	6–2
March 6	Saint Joseph's	Mark Light Field • Coral Gables, Florida	5–2	7–2
March 8	at Florida Southern	Henley Field • Lakeland, Florida	0–1	7–3
March 9	at Florida Southern	Henley Field • Lakeland, Florida	3–2	8–3
March 11	Indiana	Mark Light Field • Coral Gables, Florida	7–4	9–3
March 12	Indiana	Mark Light Field • Coral Gables, Florida	4–2	10–3
March 12	Indiana	Mark Light Field • Coral Gables, Florida	7–6	11–3
March 13	Memphis	Mark Light Field • Coral Gables, Florida	9–3	12–3
March 14	Memphis	Mark Light Field • Coral Gables, Florida	5–2	13–3
March 16	Florida State	Mark Light Field • Coral Gables, Florida	3–2	14–3
March 17	Florida State	Mark Light Field • Coral Gables, Florida	4–3	15–3
March 18	Seton Hall	Mark Light Field • Coral Gables, Florida	4–3	16–3
March 19	Ohio State	Mark Light Field • Coral Gables, Florida	16–1	17–3
March 20	Buffalo	Mark Light Field • Coral Gables, Florida	5–2	18–3
March 20	Seton Hall	Mark Light Field • Coral Gables, Florida	6–2	19–3
March 22	Buffalo	Mark Light Field • Coral Gables, Florida	16–1	20–3
March 22	Ohio State	Mark Light Field • Coral Gables, Florida	5–0	21–3
March 23	Michigan State	Mark Light Field • Coral Gables, Florida	4–1	22–3
March 25	Montclair State	Mark Light Field • Coral Gables, Florida	12–3	23–3
March 26	Southern Illinois	Mark Light Field • Coral Gables, Florida	6–1	24–3
March 27	Michigan State	Mark Light Field • Coral Gables, Florida	10–3	25–3
March 28	Montclair State	Mark Light Field • Coral Gables, Florida	12–3	26–3
March 29	Southern Illinois	Mark Light Field • Coral Gables, Florida	6–1	27–3
March 30	Michigan State	Mark Light Field • Coral Gables, Florida	13–3	28–3

April (11–4)

Date	Opponent	Site/stadium	Score	Overall Record
April 3	FIU	Mark Light Field • Coral Gables, Florida	9–4	29–3
April 4	FIU	Mark Light Field • Coral Gables, Florida	5–1	30–3
April 8	at Florida	Perry Field • Gainesville, Florida	4–0	31–3
April 9	at Florida	Perry Field • Gainesville, Florida	6–5	32–3
April 12	Rollins	Mark Light Field • Coral Gables, Florida	9–6	33–3
April 13	Rollins	Mark Light Field • Coral Gables, Florida	4–8	33–4
April 18	at Florida State	Seminole Field • Tallahassee, Florida	1–2	33–5
April 18	at Florida State	Seminole Field • Tallahassee, Florida	4–7	33–6
April 20	at Florida State	Seminole Field • Tallahassee, Florida	17–3	34–6
April 21	at Florida A&M	Unknown • Tallahassee, Florida	4–2	35–6
April 21	at Florida A&M	Unknown • Tallahassee, Florida	5–8	35–7
April 23	at FIU	Unknown • Miami, Florida	6–2	36–7
April 24	Biscayne	Mark Light Field • Coral Gables, Florida	13–5	37–7
April 26	Tampa	Mark Light Field • Coral Gables, Florida	7–2	38–7
April 27	Tampa	Mark Light Field • Coral Gables, Florida	11–1	39–7

May (5–1)

Date	Opponent	Site/stadium	Score	Overall Record
May 1	Biscayne	Mark Light Field • Coral Gables, Florida	19–1	40–7
May 3	South Florida	Mark Light Field • Coral Gables, Florida	20–2	41–7
May 4	South Florida	Mark Light Field • Coral Gables, Florida	9–7	42–7
May 7	at Biscayne	Unknown • Miami, Florida	18–1	43–7
May 10	Stetson	Mark Light Field • Coral Gables, Florida	7–9	43–8
May 11	Stetson	Mark Light Field • Coral Gables, Florida	4–3	44–8

Postseason (7–3)
District 3 playoff (4–1)

Date	Opponent	Site/stadium	Score	Overall Record
May 23	vs Georgia Southern	Dudy Noble Field • Starkville, Mississippi	2–1	45–8
May 24	vs Vanderbilt	Dudy Noble Field • Starkville, Mississippi	7–1	46–8
May 25	vs South Carolina	Dudy Noble Field • Starkville, Mississippi	5–0	47–8
May 26	vs South Carolina	Dudy Noble Field • Starkville, Mississippi	1–3	47–9
May 27	vs South Carolina	Dudy Noble Field • Starkville, Mississippi	2–1	48–9

1974 College World Series (3–2)

Date	Opponent	Site/stadium	Score	Overall Record
June 7	vs Harvard	Johnny Rosenblatt Stadium • Omaha, Nebraska	4–1	49–9
June 10	vs Oklahoma	Johnny Rosenblatt Stadium • Omaha, Nebraska	5–1	50–9
June 12	vs USC Trojans	Johnny Rosenblatt Stadium • Omaha, Nebraska	7–3	51–9
June 13	vs Southern Illinois	Johnny Rosenblatt Stadium • Omaha, Nebraska	3–4	51–10
June 15	vs USC	Johnny Rosenblatt Stadium • Omaha, Nebraska	3–7	51–11

Schedule Source:

== Awards and honors ==
Orlando González

- All Tournament Team

Manny Trujillo

- All Tournament Team

Ron Scott

- All Tournament Team

Stan Jakubowski

- All Tournament Team

== Hurricanes in the 1974 MLB draft ==
The following members of the Miami Hurricanes baseball program were drafted in the 1974 Major League Baseball draft.

Round	Pick	Player	Position	MLB Club
1	24	Mike Armstrong	P	Cincinnati Reds
2	26	Witt Beckman	OF	San Diego Padres
18	410	Orlando González	1B	Cleveland Indians
35	664	Richard Reichle	3B	Baltimore Orioles
