= 1974 Arizona Wildcats baseball team =

American college baseball season

1974 Arizona Wildcats baseball

District 7 Regional

Western Athletic Conference Champions
- Conference: Western Athletic Conference
- CB: No. 9
- Record: 58–6 (16–2 WAC)
- Head coach: Jerry Kindall (2nd season)
- Assistant coach: Jim Wing (2nd season)
- Home stadium: Wildcat Field; Hi Corbett Field (Select games)

1974 Western Athletic Conference baseball standings
	Conf.				Overall
Team	W		L	PCT	W		L	PCT
Northern
BYU ^{x}‍‍‍	12	–	5	.706	29	–	17	.630
Utah ‍‍‍	11	–	7	.611	18	–	25	.419
Wyoming ‍‍‍	7	–	10	.412	28	–	28	.500
Colorado State ‍‍‍	4	–	12	.250	13	–	24	.351
Southern
No. 9 Arizona ^{x}‍‍‡‍^{y}	16	–	2	.889	58	–	6	.906
No. 19 Arizona State ‍‍‍^{y}	12	–	6	.667	39	–	24	.619
New Mexico ‍‍‍	6	–	12	.333	28	–	23	.549
UTEP ‍‍‍	2	–	16	.111	24	–	27	.471
x – Division champion ‡ – Playoff champion y – Invited to the NCAA tournament As of June 30, 1974; Rankings from Collegiate Baseball

The 1974 Arizona Wildcats baseball team represented the University of Arizona during the 1974 NCAA Division I baseball season. The Wildcats played their home games at Wildcat Field. The team was coached by Jerry Kindall in his 2nd season at Arizona. The Wildcats finished 58-6 overall and placed 1st in the Western Athletic Conference's Southern Division with a 16–2 record. Arizona faced Northern Division champion BYU in the WAC Playoffs at Cougar Field in Provo, Utah. The Wildcats defeated BYU 14-5 and 16–5 to win the WAC Championship. Arizona made the postseason for the 1st time in Jerry Kindall's tenure and the 1st time since 1970, and were placed in the District 7 Regional hosted by the University of Northern Colorado at Jackson Field in Greeley, Colorado. The Wildcats lost back-to-back games to Northern Colorado to end their season.

== Previous season ==
The Wildcats finished the 1973 season with a record of 37-16 and 15–5 in conference play, finishing 2nd in the WAC Southern. Arizona missed the postseason for the 3rd straight season.

== Personnel ==
=== Roster ===
1974 Arizona Wildcats baseball roster
• Ronald Bell • Kenneth Bolek • David Breuker • James Filippelli • David Flatt • Michael Gatlin • Joel Godfrey	• Denny Haines • Thamos Harmon • Ron Hassey • Ben Heise • Scott Norris • Patrick O'Sullivan • Steven Powers	• Martin Reid • John Roslund • Scott Russell • Mark Schimpf • Robert Starke • Dave Stegman • Marvin Thompson

=== Coaches ===
1974 Arizona Wildcats baseball coaching staff
- Jerry Kindall - Head coach
- Jim Wing - Assistant coach

== 1974 Schedule and results ==
1974 Arizona Wildcats baseball game log
Regular season
Date	Opponent	Site/Stadium	Score	Overall Record	WAC Record
Feb 15	Texas Tech	Wildcat Field • Tucson, AZ	W 10-0	1-0	
Feb 16	Texas Tech	Wildcat Field • Tucson, AZ	W 10-0	2-0	
Feb 16	Texas Tech	Hi Corbett Field • Tucson, AZ	W 12-1	3-0	
Feb 18	Azusa Pacific	Wildcat Field • Tucson, AZ	W 15-1	4-0	
Feb 19	Azusa Pacific	Wildcat Field • Tucson, AZ	W 9-2	5-0	
Feb 20	Cal State Dominguez Hills	Wildcat Field • Tucson, AZ	W 11-6	6-0	
Feb 21	Cal State Dominguez Hills	Wildcat Field • Tucson, AZ	W 6-0	7-0	
Feb 22	Cal Poly Pomona	Wildcat Field • Tucson, AZ	W 12-4	8-0	
Feb 22	Cal Poly Pomona	Hi Corbett Field • Tucson, AZ	W 3-2	9-0	
Feb 23	Cal Poly Pomona	Wildcat Field • Tucson, AZ	W 15-1	10-0	
Feb 25	Long Beach State	Wildcat Field • Tucson, AZ	W 2-1	11-0	
Feb 26	Long Beach State	Wildcat Field • Tucson, AZ	W 22-1	12-0	
Feb 26	Long Beach State	Hi Corbett Field • Tucson, AZ	W 12-1	13-0	
Feb 27	at Grand Canyon	Brazell Field • Phoenix, AZ	L 0-1	13-1	
Mar 1	San Diego State	Wildcat Field • Tucson, AZ	W 9-2	14-1	
Mar 2	San Diego State	Wildcat Field • Tucson, AZ	W 9-2	15-1	
Mar 2	San Diego State	Hi Corbett Field • Tucson, AZ	W 11-3	16-1	
Mar 4	Grand Canyon	Wildcat Field • Tucson, AZ	W 12-3	17-1	
Mar 9	at UCLA	Sawtelle Field • Los Angeles, CA	W 9-6	18-1	
Mar 9	at UCLA	Sawtelle Field • Los Angeles, CA	W 13-1	19-1	
Mar 11	Iowa	Wildcat Field • Tucson, AZ	W 13-4	20-1	
Mar 12	Iowa	Wildcat Field • Tucson, AZ	W 7-3	21-1	
Mar 13	Iowa	Wildcat Field • Tucson, AZ	W 23-0	22-1	
Mar 13	Iowa	Hi Corbett Field • Tucson, AZ	W 11-6	23-1	
Mar 15	at San Diego State	Smith Field • San Diego, CA	W 13-3	24-1	
Mar 16	at San Diego State	Smith Field • San Diego, CA	L 3-4	24-2	
Mar 16	at San Diego State	Smith Field • San Diego, CA	W 3-2	25-2	
Mar 18	Denver	Wildcat Field • Tucson, AZ	W 9-3	26-2	
Mar 19	Denver	Wildcat Field • Tucson, AZ	W 16-1	27-2	
Mar 20	Colorado State	Wildcat Field • Tucson, AZ	W 8-0	28-2	
Mar 20	Weber State	Hi Corbett Field • Tucson, AZ	W 16-1	29-2	
Mar 21	Colorado State	Wildcat Field • Tucson, AZ	W 18-0	30-2	
Mar 21	Weber State	Hi Corbett Field • Tucson, AZ	W 2-1	31-2	
Mar 22	Colorado	Wildcat Field • Tucson, AZ	W 23-1	32-2	
Mar 22	Colorado	Hi Corbett Field • Tucson, AZ	W 9-1	33-2	
Mar 23	Northern Arizona	Wildcat Field • Tucson, AZ	W 5-2	34-2	
Mar 23	Northern Arizona	Hi Corbett Field • Tucson, AZ	W 12-1	35-2	
Mar 26	Fairfield	Wildcat Field • Tucson, AZ	W 19-0	36-2	
Mar 27	Fairfield	Wildcat Field • Tucson, AZ	W 11-0	37-2	
Mar 29	Loyola Marymount	Wildcat Field • Tucson, AZ	W 16-2	38-2	
Mar 30	Loyola Marymount	Wildcat Field • Tucson, AZ	W 11-4	39-2	
Mar 30	Loyola Marymount	Hi Corbett Field • Tucson, AZ	W 4-2	40-2	
Apr 5	at New Mexico	Lobo Field • Albuquerque, NM	W 3-2	41-2	1-0
Apr 6	at New Mexico	Lobo Field • Albuquerque, NM	W 20-12	42-2	2-0
Apr 6	at New Mexico	Lobo Field • Albuquerque, NM	W 13-0	43-2	3-0
Apr 12	UTEP	Wildcat Field • Tucson, AZ	W 11-2	44-2	4-0
Apr 13	UTEP	Wildcat Field • Tucson, AZ	W 25-3	45-2	5-0
Apr 13	UTEP	Hi Corbett Field • Tucson, AZ	L 4-6	45-3	5-1
Apr 18	at Arizona State	Packard Stadium • Tempe, AZ	W 6-0	46-3	6-1
Apr 19	at Arizona State	Packard Stadium • Tempe, AZ	W 6-4	47-3	7-1
Apr 20	at Arizona State	Packard Stadium • Tempe, AZ	L 3-6	47-4	7-2
Apr 26	New Mexico	Wildcat Field • Tucson, AZ	W 4-0	48-4	8-2
Apr 27	New Mexico	Wildcat Field • Tucson, AZ	W 4-0	49-4	9-2
Apr 27	New Mexico	Hi Corbett Field • Tucson, AZ	W 17-5	50-4	10-2
May 3	at UTEP	Dudley Field • El Paso, TX	W 10-0	51-4	11-2
May 4	at UTEP	Dudley Field • El Paso, TX	W 5-0	52-4	12-2
May 4	at UTEP	Dudley Field • El Paso, TX	W 27-6	53-4	13-2
May 9	Arizona State	Hi Corbett Field • Tucson, AZ	W 14-3	54-4	14-2
May 10	Arizona State	Hi Corbett Field • Tucson, AZ	W 14-9	55-4	15-2
May 11	Arizona State	Hi Corbett Field • Tucson, AZ	W 11-1	56-4	16-2
WAC Playoffs
May 24	at BYU	Cougar Field • Provo, UT	W 14-5	57-4	
May 25	at BYU	Cougar Field • Provo, UT	W 16-5	58-4	
NCAA District 7 Regional
May 31	at Northern Colorado	Jackson Field • Greeley, CO	L 5-6	58-5	
Jun 1	at Northern Colorado	Jackson Field • Greeley, CO	L 2-6	58-6	

=== District 7 Regional ===
District 7 Regional Teams
Arizona Wildcats	Northern Colorado Bears	Gonzaga Bulldogs

== 1974 MLB draft ==
Player	Position	Round	Overall	MLB team
Denny Haines	C	4	94	Oakland Athletics
Scott Norris	OF	9	204	New York Yankees
Ben Heise	INF	10	220	Cleveland Indians
Mike Gatlin	INF	1 (6sc)	1	Cincinnati Reds
