= Rich Wortham =

American baseball player (born 1953)

- Pitcher
- Born: October 22, 1953 (age 71); Odessa, Texas, U.S.
- Batted: Right Threw: Left

MLB debut
- May 3, 1978, for the Chicago White Sox

Last MLB appearance
- July 23, 1983, for the Oakland Athletics

MLB statistics
- Win–loss record: 21–23
- Earned run average: 4.89
- Strikeouts: 189
- Stats at Baseball Reference

Teams
- Chicago White Sox (1978–1980); Oakland Athletics (1983)

Member of the College

Baseball Hall of Fame
- Induction: 2010
Medals
Men's baseball
Representing United States
Baseball World Cup
Gold medal – first place	1973 Central America	Team
Pan American Games
Silver medal – second place	1975 Mexico City	Team

Richard Cooper Wortham (born October 22, 1953) is an American former professional baseball pitcher. He played all or part of four seasons in Major League Baseball, between 1978 and 1983, for the Chicago White Sox and Oakland Athletics.

== Amateur career ==
Highly sought after out of Odessa High School in Odessa, Texas, Wortham was selected in the 5th round of the 1972 draft by the Texas Rangers, but instead elected to attend the University of Texas and play for legendary Coach Cliff Gustafson.

He was also a member of the United States national baseball team during the 1973 Amateur World Series organized by FEMBA, the first time Team USA won a Gold Medal in that competition. He defeated Dennis Martínez and Nicaragua in the final.

Wortham had a great deal of success as a college pitcher with a record of 50–7 and was the ace of the 1975 Longhorns team that won the College World Series. He was drafted again that year by the Rangers in the 14th round, but again did not sign. He was then selected by the White Sox in the January secondary phase of the 1976 draft.

== Professional career ==
=== Early minor league career ===
After signing with the White Sox, he was assigned directly to Double-A Knoxville, skipping over the lower minor league levels. He appeared in eleven games for Knoxville, 10 as a starting pitcher, finishing with a 4–2 record and an ERA of 4.24. He began the 1977 season in Knoxville, but was promoted to the Triple-A Iowa Oaks after improving to a 9–7 record and 2.53 ERA in 22 games. His introduction to the highest minor league level was a rough one, however, as his ERA ballooned to 8.71 in nine starts, of which he won only one.

=== 1978: First taste of the majors ===
In 1978, Wortham opened the season in Iowa. However, when starting pitcher Ken Kravec got off to a rough start, he was sent to the minors, and Wortham was called up to replace him. He made his debut on May 3 against the Milwaukee Brewers, and he pitched 6.2 innings and gave up 3 runs in a 4–0 loss. In his next start, he beat the Minnesota Twins, pitching 8 innings and giving up 2 runs on 9 hits. His next outing found him giving up 10 hits in just 4.1 innings, and he was returned to the minors, with Kravec returning to the majors.

Wortham spent most of the rest of the season in Iowa, and was recalled in September when the rosters expanded. In five September starts, Wortham went 2–0 with a 2.70 ERA, lowering his overall ERA for the season to 3.02. He also pitched his first two major league complete games. Wortham was seen as a future star.

=== 1979: Taking a regular turn ===
In 1979, Wortham came out of spring training as the White Sox' number three starter. Although he did not have a spectacular year, he had a solid first full season in the major leagues. He won a career-high 14 games, but his ERA was a below-average 4.90, he was in the top ten in the league in losses with 14, and he finished fourth in the league in walks allowed with 100. However, he also finished 8th in the league in strikeouts per 9 innings pitched, and it appeared that he had solidified his position as a dependable starting pitcher.

=== 1980: A step backward ===
Wortham was moved to the bullpen to start the 1980 season, where he was used as a long reliever. He got off to an impressive start, as in his first three outings of the year, he pitched at least four innings, giving up no runs and a combined four hits in 12.2 innings while picking up a pair of wins. However, as April ended, he had a bad outing, giving up five runs in two innings, followed shortly by giving up six runs without recording an out on May 4.

Wortham was moved back to the rotation, and his first start of 1980 was excellent, as he pitched seven shutout innings against the Kansas City Royals to pick up his third win of the year. However, he gave up four runs in 4.2 innings in his next start, and he went back to the bullpen. The rest of the season went much the same, as he would have good and bad outings, but more bad than good, winding up with a 5.97 ERA and a record of 4–7. After the season, the White Sox traded him to the Montreal Expos for second baseman Tony Bernazard.

=== Back to the minors: Control problems ===
Wortham was assigned by the Expos to the Triple-A Denver Bears, where he struggled with wildness. He went 5–5 for Denver in 18 games with a 4.79 ERA, and was even worse in a brief demotion to the Double-A Memphis Chicks, where he posted an 8.00 ERA in 5 games. More alarming, however, was that he walked a combined 99 batters in just 95 innings, including 28 in 18 innings in Memphis.

Wortham went to spring training with the Expos in 1982, but was released on April 1. He was signed by the Philadelphia Phillies, and was assigned to the Double-A Reading Phillies to work out his problems. Instead, they were magnified, as he not only posted 58 walks in just 36.2 innings, but he failed to win a game, going 0–5, and his ERA was a bloated 11.54. The Phillies released him during the offseason.

=== Last appearance ===
Shortly thereafter, Wortham was signed by the Athletics, whose pitching staff had collapsed after three seasons of abuse by manager Billy Martin. He was started slowly, being assigned to A-ball with the Modesto A's, the first time he had pitched at that lower level. After 14 games, in which he was 2–3 with a 6.75 ERA and 42 walks in 44 innings, he was moved up to the Double-A Albany A's. Even though his record there was even worse, the desperate Athletics summoned him to the major leagues. He made his last appearance in Major League Baseball on July 23, when he entered the game in the 8th inning in relief of Keith Atherton. He faced four batters, allowing three hits and a walk without retiring a batter. His catcher in that contest was former Longhorn teammate Bob Kearney.

== Life after baseball ==
Wortham served as the executive director of the Texas Beef Council, and he retired in 2019. Richard Cooper Wortham lived in Austin, TX before moving to his current residence of Leander, Texas. In 2010, he was elected to the College Baseball Hall of Fame.

== Sources ==
- Baseball Almanac
- Career statistics from Baseball Reference · Baseball Reference (Minors) · Retrosheet · Baseball Almanac
