= George Milke =

- Starting pitcher
- Born: 1954 (age 71–72)
- Bats: Right Throws: Right

Career highlights and awards
- College World Series Most Outstanding Player (1974)
Medals
Men's baseball
Representing United States
Amateur World Series
Gold medal – first place	1974 St. Petersburg	Team

George E. Milke (born 1954) is a former baseball pitcher. He won the 1974 College World Series Most Outstanding Player award while a sophomore at University of Southern California. He is one of seven players from USC to win that award. The others are Bill Thom, Bud Hollowell, Bill Seinsoth, Russ McQueen, Rod Boxberger and Wes Rachels.

Prior to playing collegiately, he attended Marian Catholic High School in San Diego, California.

In 1973 and 1974, he played for the Alaska Goldpanners of the Alaska Baseball League.

Following his college career, he played professionally from 1975 to 1979, although he never reached the big leagues. He was first drafted by the California Angels in the sixth round of the 1972 draft, but he chose not to sign. When he was drafted by the New York Mets in the third round of the 1975 draft, he did sign.

In his first professional season, 1975, he played for the Visalia Mets, going 8-3 with a 3.71 ERA in 17 games. From 1976 to 1978 he played for the Jackson Mets, going 4-7 with a 4.14 ERA in 1976, 7-11 with a 3.21 ERA in 1977, and 0-1 with a 3.60 ERA in 1978. He played his final professional season in 1979 with the Bakersfield Outlaws, going 2-4 with a 6.16 ERA.
