= Orlando González =

Cuban baseball player (born 1951)

- First baseman / Outfielder
- Born: November 15, 1951 (age 74); Havana, Cuba
- Batted: Left Threw: Left

MLB debut
- June 7, 1976, for the Cleveland Indians

Last MLB appearance
- October 5, 1980, for the Oakland Athletics

MLB statistics
- Batting average: .238
- Runs: 16
- Hits: 39
- Stats at Baseball Reference

Teams
- Cleveland Indians (1976); Philadelphia Phillies (1978); Oakland Athletics (1980)
Medals
Men's baseball
Representing United States
Baseball World Cup
Gold medal – first place	1973 Central America	Team

Orlando Eugene González (born November 15, 1951) is a Cuban American former professional baseball first baseman / outfielder, who played in Major League Baseball during three seasons for the Cleveland Indians, Philadelphia Phillies, and Oakland Athletics. He batted and threw left-handed.

González came to the United States from Cuba with his family at nine years old and went on to play baseball at Miami Senior High School, Miami Dade College and the University of Miami. He was named to the College Baseball All-America Team after batting .402 and stealing an NCAA-record 62 bases in 1974 and was featured in Faces in the Crowd in the August 5, 1974 issue of Sports Illustrated. He was drafted by the Cleveland Indians in the 18th round (410th overall) of the 1974 Major League Baseball draft.
