= TCU Diamond =

Ballpark in Fort Worth, Texas, US

- Interactive map of TCU Diamond
- Full name: TCU Diamond
- Location: Fort Worth, Texas
- Coordinates: 32°42′29″N 97°22′5″W
- Owner: Texas Christian University
- Capacity: 1,500
- Surface: Grass
- Field size: 330 LF; 395 CF; 320 RF

Construction
- Opened: 1962
- Closed: 2002
- Demolished: 2003

Tenants
- TCU Horned Frogs baseball 1962–2002 (SWC 1962–1996) (WAC 1997–2001) (C-USA 2002)

TCU Diamond was a ballpark located on the campus of Texas Christian University in Fort Worth, Texas, and was the home of the TCU Horned Frogs baseball program for four decades. The ballpark hosted 1,480 TCU baseball games over 41 years; in the time the Horned Frogs posted an overall 867–605–8 home record. The Horned Frogs won Southwest Conference regular season championships in 1963 (co-champions with the Texas), 1966 (co-champions with Baylor, Texas and Texas A&M), 1967 (co-champions Texas), 1972 (co-champions with Texas), and 1994 while calling the TCU Diamond home. During the TCU Diamond era, the Horned Frogs played in the Southwest Conference (SWC) (1962–1996), Western Athletic Conference (WAC) (1997–2001), and Conference USA (CUSA) (2002). After the opening of Lupton Stadium, the Frogs would go on to achieve a decade of unprecedented success under head coach Jim Schlossnagle in CUSA (2003–2005), the Mountain West Conference (MWC) (2006–2012), and the Big 12 Conference (Big 12) (2013–). In the first 13 years after the closing of the TCU Diamond, TCU baseball won 10 CUSA, MWC and Big 12 regular season conference championships, 7 CUSA, MWC and Big 12 conference tournament championships, appeared in 11 NCAA Tournaments, won 5 NCAA Tournament Regional championships, and advanced to the program's first 3 College World Series, making the CWS semifinal round in two of those three trips.

The venue held a capacity of 1,500 and sat adjacent to Amon G. Carter Stadium and Schollmaier Arena. In 2003, the TCU Diamond was razed with the opening of TCU baseball's new home at Lupton Stadium. The TCU Diamond foul poles were installed at Lupton Stadium and are the only remaining piece of the Diamond on the TCU campus. The land where the TCU Diamond sat is now the location of the Sam Baugh Indoor Practice Facility (football), Morris Practice Fields (football) and the Bob Lilly Physical Performance Center (all sports).

== Sources ==
- "Southwest Conference's Greatest Hits," Neal Farmer, c.1996
