= 1977 College Baseball All-America Team =

This is a list of college baseball players named first team All-Americans for the 1977 NCAA Division I baseball season. From 1964 to 1980, there were two generally recognized All-America selectors for baseball: the American Baseball Coaches Association and The Sporting News.

== Key ==
A	American Baseball Coaches Association
S	The Sporting News
	Member of the National College Baseball Hall of Fame
	Consensus All-American – selected by both organizations
	Consensus All-American – selected by one organization

== All-Americans ==
Position	Name	School	#	A	S	Other awards and honors
Pitcher	Bill Bordley	USC	1	—	✓	
Pitcher	Randy Martz	South Carolina	2	✓	✓	
Pitcher	Steve Taylor	Delaware	1	✓	—	
Catcher	Dennis Cirbo	Colorado	1	✓	—	
Catcher	Terry Kennedy	Florida State	1	—	✓	The Sporting News Player of the Year
First baseman	Glenn Goya	Colorado State	1	✓	—	
First baseman	Dave Hostetler	USC	1	—	✓	
Second baseman	Bob Horner	Arizona State	2	✓	✓	College World Series Most Outstanding Player
Shortstop	Stack Macko	Baylor	1	✓	—	
Shortstop	Paul Molitor	Minnesota	1	—	✓	
Third baseman	Mark Naehring	Miami (OH)	1	—	✓	
Third baseman	Bob Volk	Oral Roberts	1	✓	—	
Outfielder	Hubie Brooks	Arizona State	1	—	✓	
Outfielder	Darrell Brown	Cal State Los Angeles	2	✓	✓	
Outfielder	Sam Davis	Jacksonville State	1	—	✓	
Outfielder	Buck Showalter	Mississippi State	1	✓	—	
Outfielder	Al Weston	Michigan State	1	✓	—	
Designated hitter	Larry Patterson	Gonzaga	1	✓	—	
Designated hitter	George Vukovich	Southern Illinois	1	—	✓	

== See also ==
- List of college baseball awards
