= 1977 NCAA Division I baseball season =

Baseball season

- Number of teams: 228
- Defending champions: Arizona

NCAA tournament

College World Series
- Champions: Arizona State (4th title)
- Runners-up: South Carolina (2nd CWS Appearance)
- Winning coach: Jim Brock (1st title)
- MOP: Bob Horner (Arizona State)

Seasons
- ← 1976 1978 →

The 1977 NCAA Division I baseball season, play of college baseball in the United States organized by the National Collegiate Athletic Association (NCAA) began in the spring of 1977. The season progressed through the regular season and concluded with the 1977 College World Series. The College World Series, held for the 31st time in 1977, consisted of one team from each of eight regional competitions and was held in Omaha, Nebraska at Johnny Rosenblatt Stadium as a double-elimination tournament. Arizona State claimed the championship for the fourth time.

== Conference winners ==
This is a partial list of conference champions from the 1977 season. The NCAA sponsored regional competitions to determine the College World Series participants. Seven regionals of four teams and one of six each competed in double-elimination tournaments, with the winners advancing to Omaha. 20 teams earned automatic bids by winning their conference championship while 14 teams earned at-large selections.

Conference	Regular season winner	Conference tournament	Tournament venue • city	Tournament winner
Atlantic Coast Conference	Clemson	1977 Atlantic Coast Conference baseball tournament	Beautiful Tiger Field • Clemson, SC	Wake Forest
Big Eight Conference	East - Oklahoma; West - Missouri	1977 Big Eight Conference baseball tournament	All Sports Stadium • Oklahoma City, OK	Oklahoma
Big Ten Conference	Minnesota	No tournament		
EIBL	Cornell/Columbia	No tournament		
Mid-American Conference	Central Michigan	No tournament		
Pacific-8 Conference	North - Washington State; South - Southern California	No tournament		
Southeastern Conference	East - Florida; West - Ole Miss	1977 Southeastern Conference baseball tournament	Swayze Field • Oxford, MS	Ole Miss
Southern California Baseball Association	Cal State Los Angeles	No tournament		
Southern Conference	East Carolina	No tournament		
Southwest Conference	Texas A&M	1977 Southwest Conference baseball tournament	Disch–Falk Field • Austin, TX	Baylor
Western Athletic Conference	North - BYU; South - Arizona State	1977 Western Athletic Conference Baseball Championship Series	Packard Stadium • Tempe, AZ	Arizona State
Yankee Conference	Connecticut	No tournament		

== Conference standings ==
The following is an incomplete list of conference standings:

1977 Atlantic Coast Conference baseball standings
	Conf.				Overall
Team	W		L	PCT	W		L	PCT
No. 5 Clemson ‍†‍‍^{y}	9	–	1	.900	42	–	10	.808
Maryland ‍‍‍	7	–	4	.636	14	–	12	.538
No. 14 Wake Forest ‍‍‡‍^{y}	7	–	5	.583	31	–	13	.705
North Carolina ‍‍‍	6	–	6	.500	18	–	17	.514
NC State ‍‍‍	5	–	5	.500	27	–	12	.692
Duke ‍‍‍	1	–	7	.125	9	–	16	.360
Virginia ‍‍‍	1	–	8	.111	11	–	22	.333
† – Conference champion ‡ – Tournament champion y – Invited to the NCAA tournament As of June 30, 1977; Rankings from Collegiate Baseball

1977 Big Ten Conference baseball standings
	Conf.				Overall
Team	W		L	PCT	W		L	PCT
No. 6 Minnesota ‍†‍‍^{y}	15	–	3	.833	39	–	12	.765
No. 19 Michigan ‍‍‍^{y}	14	–	4	.778	33	–	15	.688
Ohio State ‍‍‍	11	–	5	.688	25	–	24	.510
Iowa ‍‍‍	10	–	8	.556	40	–	14	.741
Michigan State ‍‍‍	10	–	8	.556	28	–	26	.519
Illinois ‍‍‍	8	–	10	.444	23	–	25	.479
Northwestern ‍‍‍	7	–	9	.438	27	–	16	.628
Wisconsin ‍‍‍	7	–	11	.389	22	–	27	.449
Indiana ‍‍‍	4	–	14	.222	21	–	26	.447
Purdue ‍‍‍	2	–	16	.111	14	–	27	.341
† – Conference champion y – Invited to the NCAA tournament As of June 30, 1977; Rankings from Collegiate Baseball

1977 Southeastern Conference baseball standings
	Conf.				Overall
Team	W		L	PCT	W		L	PCT
Eastern Division
No. 13 Florida ^{x}‍‍‍^{y}	14	–	9	.609	39	–	19	.672
Vanderbilt ‍‍‍	13	–	10	.565	25	–	25	.500
Tennessee ‍‍‍	11	–	12	.478	24	–	24	.500
Kentucky ‍‍‍	10	–	12	.455	22	–	20	.524
Georgia ‍‍‍	9	–	14	.391	22	–	24	.478
Western Division
Ole Miss ^{x}‍‍‡‍^{y}	15	–	9	.625	40	–	18	.690
Mississippi State ‍‍‍	11	–	9	.550	33	–	15	.688
Auburn ‍‍‍	11	–	9	.550	28	–	18	.609
Alabama ‍‍‍	10	–	9	.526	27	–	18	.600
LSU ‍‍‍	4	–	15	.211	17	–	27	.386
x – Division champion ‡ – Tournament champion y – Invited to the NCAA tournament As of June 30, 1977; Rankings from Collegiate Baseball

1977 Southern California Baseball Association standings
	Conf.						Overall
Team	W		L		T	PCT	W		L		T	PCT
No. 4 Cal State Los Angeles ‍†‍‍^{y}	42	–	22	–	0	.656	17	–	7	–	0	.708
No. 20 Cal State Fullerton ‍†‍‍^{y}	44	–	14	–	0	.759	17	–	7	–	0	.708
San Diego State ‍‍‍	49	–	16	–	1	.750	16	–	8	–	0	.667
Pepperdine ‍‍‍	23	–	27	–	2	.462	12	–	11	–	1	.521
Loyola Marymount ‍‍‍	20	–	33	–	0	.377	10	–	14	–	0	.417
UC Santa Barbara ‍‍‍	18	–	25	–	0	.419	7	–	17	–	0	.292
Long Beach State ‍‍‍	11	–	43	–	1	.209	4	–	19	–	1	.188
† – Conference champion y – Invited to the NCAA tournament As of June 30, 1977; Rankings from Collegiate Baseball

1977 Southern Conference baseball standings
	Conf.				Overall
Team	W		L	PCT	W		L	PCT
East Carolina ‍†‍‍^{y}	15	–	1	.938	30	–	12	.714
Western Carolina ‍‍‍	14	–	2	.875	27	–	5	.844
The Citadel ‍‍‍	10	–	4	.714	21	–	11	.656
Marshall ‍‍‍	8	–	8	.500	20	–	21	.488
William & Mary ‍‍‍	7	–	9	.438	15	–	25	.375
Appalachian State ‍‍‍	6	–	10	.375	21	–	14	.600
Davidson ‍‍‍	5	–	11	.313	15	–	25	.375
Chattanooga ‍‍‍		–		–	23	–	14	.622
Furman ‍‍‍	3	–	13	.188	14	–	30	.318
VMI ‍‍‍	2	–	12	.143	5	–	19	.208
y – Invited to the NCAA tournament As of June 30, 1977; Rankings from Collegiate Baseball

1977 Southwest Conference baseball standings
	Conf.						Overall
Team	W		L		T	PCT	W		L		T	PCT
No. 16 Texas A&M ‍†‍‍^{y}	18	–	4	–	0	.818	37	–	16	–	0	.698
No. 18 Texas ‍‍‍	17	–	7	–	0	.708	53	–	9	–	0	.855
No. 7 Baylor ‍‍‡‍^{y}	15	–	9	–	0	.625	43	–	15	–	0	.741
Arkansas ‍‍‍	14	–	10	–	0	.583	33	–	18	–	0	.647
Texas Tech ‍‍‍	12	–	12	–	0	.500	25	–	24	–	0	.510
Houston ‍‍‍	11	–	12	–	1	.479	27	–	17	–	1	.611
Texas Christian ‍‍‍	9	–	13	–	1	.413	22	–	22	–	1	.500
Rice ‍‍‍	7	–	15	–	0	.318	15	–	26	–	0	.366
Southern Methodist ‍‍‍	1	–	22	–	0	.043	14	–	33	–	0	.298
† – Conference champion ‡ – Tournament champion y – Invited to the NCAA tournament As of June 30, 1977; Rankings from Collegiate Baseball

1977 Western Athletic Conference baseball standings
	Conf.				Overall
Team	W		L	PCT	W		L	PCT
Northern
BYU ^{x}‍‍‍	16	–	2	.889	35	–	17	.673
Colorado State ‍‍‍	7	–	11	.389	38	–	25	.603
Wyoming ‍‍‍	7	–	11	.389	17	–	30	.362
Utah ‍‍‍	6	–	12	.333	17	–	28	.378
Southern
No. 1 Arizona State ^{x}‍‍‍^{y}	15	–	3	.833	57	–	12	.826
Arizona ‍‍‍	11	–	7	.611	38	–	25	.603
New Mexico ‍‍‍	7	–	11	.389	32	–	20	.615
UTEP ‍‍‍	3	–	15	.167	26	–	24	.520
x – Division champion y – Invited to the NCAA tournament As of June 30, 1977; Rankings from Collegiate Baseball

== College World Series ==
The 1977 season marked the thirty first NCAA baseball tournament, which culminated with the eight team College World Series. The College World Series was held in Omaha, Nebraska. The eight teams played a double-elimination format, with Arizona State claiming their fourth championship with a 2–1 win over South Carolina in the final.

Upper round 1
Southern Illinois	10
Temple	5
Arizona State	10
Clemson	7
Cal State Los Angeles	7
Minnesota	4
South Carolina	3^{10}
Baylor	2

Upper round 2
Southern Illinois	3
Arizona State	2
Cal State Los Angeles	2
South Carolina	6
Lower round 1
Temple	4
Clemson	13
Minnesota	4^{11}
Baylor	3

Upper final
Southern Illinois	4
South Carolina	5
Lower round 2
Cal State Los Angeles	1
Clemson	0
Arizona State	8
Minnesota	4

Semifinals
South Carolina	2
Arizona State	6
Southern Illinois	9
Cal State Los Angeles	7

Preliminary final
Arizona State	10
Southern Illinois	0

Final
South Carolina	1
Arizona State	2
