= 1977 Arizona State Sun Devils baseball team =

American college baseball season

1977 Arizona State Sun Devils baseball

National champions WAC champions
- Conference: Western Athletic Conference
- CB: No. 1
- Record: 57–12 (15–3 WAC)
- Head coach: Jim Brock (6th year)
- Assistant coaches: Pat Kuehner; Roger Schmuck
- Home stadium: Packard Stadium

1977 Western Athletic Conference baseball standings
	Conf.				Overall
Team	W		L	PCT	W		L	PCT
Northern
BYU ^{x}‍‍‍	16	–	2	.889	35	–	17	.673
Colorado State ‍‍‍	7	–	11	.389	38	–	25	.603
Wyoming ‍‍‍	7	–	11	.389	17	–	30	.362
Utah ‍‍‍	6	–	12	.333	17	–	28	.378
Southern
No. 1 Arizona State ^{x}‍‍‍^{y}	15	–	3	.833	57	–	12	.826
Arizona ‍‍‍	11	–	7	.611	38	–	25	.603
New Mexico ‍‍‍	7	–	11	.389	32	–	20	.615
UTEP ‍‍‍	3	–	15	.167	26	–	24	.520
x – Division champion y – Invited to the NCAA tournament As of June 30, 1977; Rankings from Collegiate Baseball

The 1977 Arizona State Sun Devils baseball team represented Arizona State University in the 1977 NCAA Division I baseball season. The Sun Devils played their home games at Packard Stadium. The team was coached by Jim Brock in his 6th season at Arizona State.

The Sun Devils won the College World Series, defeating the South Carolina Gamecocks in the championship game.

== Roster ==
1977 Arizona State Sun Devils roster
Pitchers: 8 Tom Teuchert; 10 Larry Eiler; 11 Jerry Vasquez; 12 Jim Haggerty; 15 Casey Lindsey; 18 Tom Hawk; 24 Tom Van Der Meersche; 25 Pat Gillie; 27 Mitch Dean; 29 Darrell Jackson	Infielders: 3 Mike Parkinson; 4 Rick Peters; 5 Bob Horner; 6 Chris Nyman; 14 Mike Henderson; 17 Brandt Humphry; 20 Jamie Allen	Outfielders: 2 James Pearson; 7 Hubie Brooks; 9 Dave Hudgens; 16 Mike Anicich; 19 Ed Irvine; 23 Mike Hildebrandt; 28 Steve Michael; Catchers: 21 Dale Eiler; 22 Chris Bando

== Schedule ==
1977 Arizona State Sun Devils baseball game log
Regular season
February

Date	Opponent	Score	Overall record	WAC record
February 16	Azusa Pacific	12–7	1–0	–
February 16	Azusa Pacific	15–3	2–0	–
February 18	Loyola Marymount	4–2	3–0	–
February 19	Loyola Marymount	9–4	4–0	–
February 19	Loyola Marymount	10–1	5–0	–
February 21	Chapman	7–5	6–0	–
February 21	Chapman	7–6	7–0	–
February 22	Chapman	22–8	8–0	–
February 25	Cal State Fullerton	5–4	9–0	–
February 26	Cal State Fullerton	7–3	10–0	–
February 26	Cal State Fullerton	8–9	10–1	–
February 28	La Verne	9–8	11–1	–

March

Date	Opponent	Score	Overall record	WAC record
March 1	La Verne	8–2	12–1	–
March 3	Southern California	7–5	13–1	–
March 4	Southern California	9–12	13–2	–
March 5	Southern California	8–4	14–2	–
March 6	Cal State Northridge	8–6	15–2	–
March 7	UNLV	6–5	16–2	–
March 8	UNLV	7–0	17–2	–
March 10	Wyoming	14–0	18–2	–
March 11	Fresno State	6–4	19–2	–
March 11	Fresno State	4–3	20–2	–
March 12	Fresno State	9–5	21–2	–
March 14	at UNLV	12–14	21–3	–
March 15	at UNLV	13–8	22–3	–
March 17	at Southern California	10–3	23–3	–
March 18	at Southern California	8–10	23–4	–
March 19	at Southern California	6–9	23–5	–
March 23	at Arizona	8–9	23–6	–
March 24	Grand Canyon	18–8	24–6	–
March 24	Pepperdine	10–3	25–6	–
March 25	Oregon State	11–6	26–6	–
March 26	Northern Arizona	10–8	27–6	–
March 26	Arizona	8–7	28–6	–
March 29	at Hawaii	0–3	28–7	–
March 29	at Hawaii	0–6	28–8	–
March 30	at Hawaii	7–0	29–8	–
March 30	at Hawaii	13–3	30–8	–

April

Date	Opponent	Score	Overall record	WAC record
April 8	at New Mexico	4–1	31–8	1–0
April 9	at New Mexico	1–2	31–9	1–1
April 9	at New Mexico	2–4	31–10	1–2
April 15	UTEP	15–0	32–10	2–2
April 15	UTEP	21–4	33–10	3–2
April 16	UTEP	13–2	34–10	4–2
April 21	at Arizona	6–9	34–11	4–3
April 22	at Arizona	10–4	35–11	5–3
April 23	at Arizona	13–6	36–11	6–3
April 26	Grand Canyon	15–2	37–11	–
April 28	New Mexico	12–4	38–11	7–3
April 29	New Mexico	11–2	39–11	8–3

May

Date	Opponent	Score	Overall record	WAC record
May 3	at Northern Arizona	17–10	41–11	–
May 6	at UTEP	27–1	42–11	10–3
May 7	at UTEP	4–2	43–11	11–3
May 7	at UTEP	17–1	44–11	12–3
May 11	Arizona	5–4	45–11	13–3
May 12	Arizona	7–2	46–11	14–3
May 14	Arizona	11–7	47–11	15–3
May 19	BYU	7–2	48–11	–
May 20	BYU	8–1	49–11	–

Postseason
NCAA tournament: Rocky Mountain Regional

Date	Opponent	Site/stadium	Score	Overall record
May 27	vs. Cal State Fullerton	Packard Stadium	6–2	50–11
May 28	vs. Washington State	Packard Stadium	11–7	51–11
May 29	vs. Washington State	Packard Stadium	3–2	52–11

NCAA tournament: College World Series

Date	Opponent	Site/stadium	Score	Overall record
June 10	vs. Clemson	Rosenblatt Stadium	10–7	53–11
June 13	vs. Southern Illinois	Rosenblatt Stadium	2–3	53–12
June 14	vs. Minnesota	Rosenblatt Stadium	8–4	54–12
June 16	vs. South Carolina	Rosenblatt Stadium	6–2	55–12
June 17	vs. Southern Illinois	Rosenblatt Stadium	10–0	56–12
June 18	vs. South Carolina	Rosenblatt Stadium	2–1	57–12

== Awards and honors ==
Jamie Allen

- College World Series All-Tournament Team

Chris Bando

- First Team All-WAC

Hubie Brooks

- First Team All-American

Mike Henderson

- College World Series All-Tournament Team
- First Team All-WAC

Bob Horner

- College World Series Most Outstanding Player
- First Team All-American
- First Team All-WAC

Dave Hudgens

- First Team All-American
- First Team All-WAC

Brandt Humphry

- College World Series All-Tournament Team

Darrell Jackson

- First Team All-WAC

Chris Nyman

- College World Series All-Tournament Team

Rick Peters

- First Team All-American
- First Team All-WAC

Jerry Vasquez

- College World Series All-Tournament Team

== Sun Devils in the 1977 MLB draft ==
The following members of the Arizona State Sun Devils baseball program were drafted in the 1977 Major League Baseball draft.

Player	Position	Round	Overall	MLB team
Jerry Vasquez	RHP	3rd	61st	Texas Rangers
Rick Peterson	OF	7th	161st	Detroit Tigers
Brandt Humphry	3B	9th	215th	California Angels
Darrell Jackson	LHP	9th	215th	Minnesota Twins
Mike Henderson	SS	11th	263rd	Milwaukee Brewers
Dave Hudgens	1B	18th	444th	Milwaukee Brewers
Chris Bando	C	22nd	541st	Milwaukee Brewers
