= 1977 Arizona Wildcats baseball team =

American college baseball season

1977 Arizona Wildcats baseball
- Conference: Western Athletic Conference
- Record: 37–25–1 (11–7 WAC)
- Head coach: Jerry Kindall (5th season)
- Assistant coach: Jim Wing (5th season)
- Home stadium: Wildcat Field

1977 Western Athletic Conference baseball standings
	Conf.				Overall
Team	W		L	PCT	W		L	PCT
Northern
BYU ^{x}‍‍‍	16	–	2	.889	35	–	17	.673
Colorado State ‍‍‍	7	–	11	.389	38	–	25	.603
Wyoming ‍‍‍	7	–	11	.389	17	–	30	.362
Utah ‍‍‍	6	–	12	.333	17	–	28	.378
Southern
No. 1 Arizona State ^{x}‍‍‍^{y}	15	–	3	.833	57	–	12	.826
Arizona ‍‍‍	11	–	7	.611	38	–	25	.603
New Mexico ‍‍‍	7	–	11	.389	32	–	20	.615
UTEP ‍‍‍	3	–	15	.167	26	–	24	.520
x – Division champion y – Invited to the NCAA tournament As of June 30, 1977; Rankings from Collegiate Baseball

The 1977 Arizona Wildcats baseball team represented the University of Arizona during the 1977 NCAA Division I baseball season. The Wildcats played their home games at Wildcat Field. The team was coached by Jerry Kindall in his 5th season at Arizona. The Wildcats finished 37-25-1 overall and placed 2nd in the Western Athletic Conference's Southern Division with a 11–7 record. Arizona missed the postseason for the 1st time since Jerry Kindall's 1st season in 1973.

== Previous season ==
The Wildcats finished the 1976 season with a record of 56-17 and 12–4 in conference play, finishing 2nd in the WAC Southern. Arizona advanced to the postseason for the 3rd straight season and was placed in the Midwest Regional hosted by the University of Texas-Pan American at Jody Ramsey Memorial Stadium in Edinburg, Texas. The Wildcats defeated Texas-Pan American, Missouri and Texas A&M to advance to the College World Series for the 1st time since 1970 (and 10th overall). After losing their 1st game in Omaha, Nebraska to rival Arizona State, Arizona won the next 4 against Oklahoma, Clemson, Eastern Michigan and Arizona State to advance to the final game: a rematch against Eastern Michigan. The Wildcats defeated Eastern Michigan 7–1 to win their 1st National Championship in program history.

== Personnel ==
=== Roster ===
1977 Arizona Wildcats baseball roster
• Mark Arnold • Robin Carlsen • David Crutcher • Bruce Ferguson • Lynn Garett • David Germann • Kenneth Harcus • Anthony Incavaglia	• Gary Johnson • Darnell Kirkland • Rick McConnell • Charles McMichael • Steven Masco • James Morley • Ray Murillo • Virgel Overlund • Les Pearsey	• John Rodriguez • Richard Stagg • Jeffery Stanley • Jamie Tadeo • Peter Van Horne • Glenn Wendt • Robert Woodside • Chuck Zopfi

=== Coaches ===
1977 Arizona Wildcats baseball coaching staff
- Jerry Kindall - Head coach
- Jim Wing - Assistant coach

== 1977 Schedule and results ==
1977 Arizona Wildcats baseball game log
Regular season
Date	Opponent	Site/Stadium	Score	Overall Record	WAC Record
Feb 11	Cal State Fullerton	Wildcat Field • Tucson, AZ	L 4-14	0-1-0	
Feb 12	Cal State Fullerton	Wildcat Field • Tucson, AZ	L 0-11	0-2-0	
Feb 12	Cal State Fullerton	Wildcat Field • Tucson, AZ	W 5-3	1-2-0	
Feb 14	Azusa Pacific	Wildcat Field • Tucson, AZ	W 14-9	2-2-0	
Feb 15	Azusa Pacific	Wildcat Field • Tucson, AZ	W 5-3	3-2-0	
Feb 16	at Grand Canyon	Brazell Field • Phoenix, AZ	W 5-4	4-2-0	
Feb 18	UC Riverside	Wildcat Field • Tucson, AZ	L 4-9	4-3-0	
Feb 19	UC Riverside	Wildcat Field • Tucson, AZ	W 11-9	5-3-0	
Feb 19	UC Riverside	Wildcat Field • Tucson, AZ	L 0-9	5-4-0	
Feb 21	Loyola Marymount	Wildcat Field • Tucson, AZ	L 5-8	5-5-0	
Feb 22	Loyola Marymount	Wildcat Field • Tucson, AZ	W 15-7	6-5-0	
Feb 23	Grand Canyon	Wildcat Field • Tucson, AZ	W 9-8	7-5-0	
Feb 24	San Diego State	Wildcat Field • Tucson, AZ	L 2-9	7-6-0	
Feb 25	San Diego State	Wildcat Field • Tucson, AZ	L 3-8	7-7-0	
Feb 26	San Diego State	Wildcat Field • Tucson, AZ	L 4-8	7-8-0	
Feb 28	Cal State Dominguez Hills	Wildcat Field • Tucson, AZ	W 9-8	8-8-0	
Mar 1	Cal State Dominguez Hills	Wildcat Field • Tucson, AZ	W 6-3	9-8-0	
Mar 2	La Verne	Wildcat Field • Tucson, AZ	L 10-13	9-9-0	
Mar 3	La Verne	Wildcat Field • Tucson, AZ	L 5-11	9-10-0	
Mar 4	Cal State Northridge	Wildcat Field • Tucson, AZ	L 4-5	9-11-0	
Mar 5	Cal State Northridge	Wildcat Field • Tucson, AZ	W 6-5	10-11-0	
Mar 10	at San Diego State	Smith Field • San Diego, CA	L 4-9	10-12-0	
Mar 11	at San Diego State	Smith Field • San Diego, CA	L 1-9	10-13-0	
Mar 12	at San Diego State	Smith Field • San Diego, CA	W 26-6	11-13-0	
Mar 14	at Loyola Marymount	Sullivan Field • Los Angeles, CA	W 10-7	12-13-0	
Mar 15	at Loyola Marymount	Sullivan Field • Los Angeles, CA	W 15-6	13-13-0	
Mar 17	at Cal State Northridge	Matador Field • Los Angeles, CA	W 8-0	14-13-0	
Mar 18	at UCLA	Sawtelle Field • Los Angeles, CA	L 1-7	14-14-0	
Mar 19	at UCLA	Sawtelle Field • Los Angeles, CA	W 9-1	15-14-0	
Mar 21	Colorado State	Wildcat Field • Tucson, AZ	W 9-1	16-14-0	
Mar 22	Colorado State	Wildcat Field • Tucson, AZ	W 8-3	17-14-0	
Mar 23	Arizona State	Wildcat Field • Tucson, AZ	W 9-8	18-14-0	
Mar 24	Northern Arizona	Wildcat Field • Tucson, AZ	W 9-8	19-14-0	
Mar 24	Oregon State	Wildcat Field • Tucson, AZ	W 7-3	20-14-0	
Mar 25	Pepperdine	Wildcat Field • Tucson, AZ	W 17-2	21-14-0	
Mar 26	at Arizona State	Packard Stadium • Tempe, AZ	L 7-8	21-15-0	
Mar 28	vs San Diego State	San Jose Municipal Stadium • San Jose, CA	T 3-3	21-15-1	
Mar 29	vs Pacific	San Jose Municipal Stadium • San Jose, CA	L 3-10	21-16-1	
Mar 30	vs Oregon State	San Jose Municipal Stadium • San Jose, CA	W 11-3	22-16-1	
Mar 30	at San Jose State	San Jose Municipal Stadium • San Jose, CA	L 4-6	22-17-1	
Mar 31	vs San Francisco	San Jose Municipal Stadium • San Jose, CA	W 12-0	23-17-1	
Apr 1	vs Stanford	San Jose Municipal Stadium • San Jose, CA	W 8-6	24-17-1	
Apr 2	vs San Diego State	San Jose Municipal Stadium • San Jose, CA	L 11-12	24-18-1	
Apr 4	Northern Arizona	Wildcat Field • Tucson, AZ	W 11-5	25-18-1	
Apr 5	Northern Arizona	Wildcat Field • Tucson, AZ	W 5-1	26-18-1	
Apr 8	UTEP	Wildcat Field • Tucson, AZ	W 27-5	27-18-1	1-0
Apr 9	UTEP	Wildcat Field • Tucson, AZ	W 10-8	28-18-1	2-0
Apr 9	UTEP	Wildcat Field • Tucson, AZ	W 15-5	29-18-1	3-0
Apr 15	at New Mexico	Lobo Field • Albuquerque, NM	W 8-2	30-18-1	4-0
Apr 16	at New Mexico	Lobo Field • Albuquerque, NM	W 7-3	31-18-1	5-0
Apr 16	at New Mexico	Lobo Field • Albuquerque, NM	W 9-3	32-18-1	6-0
Apr 21	Arizona State	Wildcat Field • Tucson, AZ	W 9-6	33-18-1	7-0
Apr 22	Arizona State	Wildcat Field • Tucson, AZ	L 4-10	33-19-1	7-1
Apr 23	Arizona State	Wildcat Field • Tucson, AZ	L 6-13	33-20-1	7-2
Apr 29	at UTEP	Dudley Field • El Paso, TX	W 2-1	34-20-1	8-2
Apr 30	at UTEP	Dudley Field • El Paso, TX	L 3-8	34-21-1	8-3
Apr 30	at UTEP	Dudley Field • El Paso, TX	L 6-11	34-22-1	8-4
May 6	New Mexico	Wildcat Field • Tucson, AZ	W 10-1	35-22-1	9-4
May 7	New Mexico	Wildcat Field • Tucson, AZ	W 7-6	36-22-1	10-4
May 7	New Mexico	Wildcat Field • Tucson, AZ	W 11-0	37-22-1	11-4
May 11	at Arizona State	Packard Stadium • Tempe, AZ	L 4-5	37-23-1	11-5
May 12	at Arizona State	Packard Stadium • Tempe, AZ	L 2-7	37-24-1	11-6
May 14	at Arizona State	Packard Stadium • Tempe, AZ	L 7-11	37-25-1	11-7

== 1977 MLB draft ==
Player	Position	Round	Overall	MLB team
Lynn Garett	OF	11	271	Cleveland Indians
Glenn Wendt	INF	12	297	Cleveland Indians
Les Pearsey	INF	28	672	California Angels
