= 1977 Southeastern Conference baseball tournament =

- Teams: 4
- Format: Four-team double elimination tournament
- Finals site: Swayze Field; Oxford, Mississippi
- Champions: Ole Miss (1st title)
- Winning coach: Jake Gibbs (1st title)

1977 Southeastern Conference baseball standings
	Conf.				Overall
Team	W		L	PCT	W		L	PCT
Eastern Division
No. 13 Florida ^{x}‍‍‍^{y}	14	–	9	.609	39	–	19	.672
Vanderbilt ‍‍‍	13	–	10	.565	25	–	25	.500
Tennessee ‍‍‍	11	–	12	.478	24	–	24	.500
Kentucky ‍‍‍	10	–	12	.455	22	–	20	.524
Georgia ‍‍‍	9	–	14	.391	22	–	24	.478
Western Division
Ole Miss ^{x}‍‍‡‍^{y}	15	–	9	.625	40	–	18	.690
Mississippi State ‍‍‍	11	–	9	.550	33	–	15	.688
Auburn ‍‍‍	11	–	9	.550	28	–	18	.609
Alabama ‍‍‍	10	–	9	.526	27	–	18	.600
LSU ‍‍‍	4	–	15	.211	17	–	27	.386
x – Division champion ‡ – Tournament champion y – Invited to the NCAA tournament As of June 30, 1977; Rankings from Collegiate Baseball

The 1977 Southeastern Conference baseball tournament was held at Swayze Field in Oxford, Mississippi, from May 13 through 16. Ole Miss won the tournament and earned the Southeastern Conference's automatic bid to the 1977 NCAA tournament.

The 1977 tournament was the first baseball tournament held by the SEC. It has been held every year since.

== Regular season results ==
Team	W	L	Pct	GB	Seed
Eastern Division
Florida	14	9	.609	—	2
Vanderbilt	13	10	.565	1	3
Tennessee	11	12	.478	3	—
Kentucky	10	12	.455	3.5	—
Georgia	9	14	.391	5	—

Team	W	L	Pct	GB	Seed
Western Division
Ole Miss	15	9	.625	—	1
Mississippi State	11	9	.550	2	4
Auburn	11	9	.550	2	—
Alabama	10	9	.526	2.5	—
LSU	4	15	.211	8.5	—

== Tournament ==
First round
4	Mississippi State	1
2	Florida	3
1	Ole Miss	9
3	Vanderbilt	7
Lower round 1
4	Mississippi State	15
3	Vanderbilt	2

Semi-finals
2	Florida	5
1	Ole Miss	4
Lower final
4	Mississippi State	3
1	Ole Miss	11

Finals
2	Florida	6	4
1	Ole Miss	7	7

== See also ==
- College World Series
- NCAA Division I Baseball Championship
- Southeastern Conference baseball tournament
