= 1977 Southwest Conference baseball tournament =

Sports event

- Teams: 4
- Format: Double-elimination tournament
- Finals site: Disch–Falk Field; Austin, TX
- Champions: Baylor (1st title)
- Winning coach: Mickey Sullivan (1st title)

1977 Southwest Conference baseball standings
	Conf.						Overall
Team	W		L		T	PCT	W		L		T	PCT
No. 16 Texas A&M ‍†‍‍^{y}	18	–	4	–	0	.818	37	–	16	–	0	.698
No. 18 Texas ‍‍‍	17	–	7	–	0	.708	53	–	9	–	0	.855
No. 7 Baylor ‍‍‡‍^{y}	15	–	9	–	0	.625	43	–	15	–	0	.741
Arkansas ‍‍‍	14	–	10	–	0	.583	33	–	18	–	0	.647
Texas Tech ‍‍‍	12	–	12	–	0	.500	25	–	24	–	0	.510
Houston ‍‍‍	11	–	12	–	1	.479	27	–	17	–	1	.611
Texas Christian ‍‍‍	9	–	13	–	1	.413	22	–	22	–	1	.500
Rice ‍‍‍	7	–	15	–	0	.318	15	–	26	–	0	.366
Southern Methodist ‍‍‍	1	–	22	–	0	.043	14	–	33	–	0	.298
† – Conference champion ‡ – Tournament champion y – Invited to the NCAA tournament As of June 30, 1977; Rankings from Collegiate Baseball

The 1977 Southwest Conference baseball tournament was the league's annual postseason tournament used to determine the Southwest Conference's (SWC) automatic bid to the 1977 NCAA Division I baseball tournament. The tournament was held from May 19 through 22 at Disch–Falk Field on the campus of The University of Texas in Austin, Texas.

The number 3 seed Baylor Bears went 3–0 to win the team's first SWC tournament under head coach Mickey Sullivan.

== Format and seeding ==
The tournament featured the top four finishers of the SWC's 9 teams in a double-elimination tournament.

Place	Team	Conference				Overall			Seed
Place	Team	W	L	%	GB	W	L	%	Seed
1	Texas A&M	18	4	.818	-	37	16	.698	1
2	Texas	17	7	.708	2	53	9	.855	2
3	Baylor	15	9	.625	4	43	15	.741	3
4	Arkansas	14	10	.583	5	33	18	.647	4
5	Texas Tech	12	12	.500	7	25	24	.510	-
6	Houston	11	12	.478	7.5	27	17	.614	-
7	TCU	9	13	.409	9	22	22	.500	-
8	Rice	7	15	.318	11	15	26	.366	-
9	SMU	1	22	.043	17.5	14	33	.298	-

== Tournament ==
First round
1	Texas A&M	5
4	Arkansas	2
2	Texas	2
3	Baylor	3
Lower round 1
4	Arkansas	1
2	Texas	8

Semifinals
1	Texas A&M	1
3	Baylor	2
Lower final
1	Texas A&M	5
2	Texas	9

Finals
3	Baylor	7	–
2	Texas	0	–
