= Ricky Peters =

American baseball player (1955–2025)

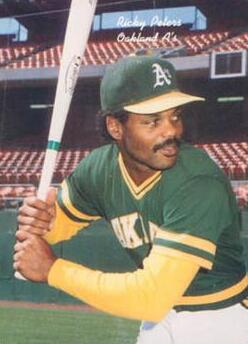
- Peters with the Oakland Athletics c. 1986
- Center fielder
- Born: November 21, 1955; Lynwood, California, U.S.
- Died: March 9, 2025 (aged 69); Maricopa, Arizona, U.S.
- Batted: Both Threw: Right

MLB debut
- September 8, 1979, for the Detroit Tigers

Last MLB appearance
- June 29, 1986, for the Oakland Athletics

MLB statistics
- Batting average: .277
- Home runs: 2
- Runs batted in: 80
- Stats at Baseball Reference

Teams
- Detroit Tigers (1979–1981); Oakland Athletics (1983, 1986)

Richard Devin Peters (November 21, 1955 – March 9, 2025) was an American professional baseball player. He played professional baseball, principally as an outfielder, including five seasons in Major League Baseball for the Detroit Tigers (1979–1981) and Oakland Athletics (1983, 1986). In five major league seasons, he compiled a .277 batting average and .356 on-base percentage. Peters was also a member of the 1977 Arizona State Sun Devils baseball team that won the 1977 College World Series and the 1979 Evansville Triplets team that won the American Association championship.

== Early years ==
Peters was born in 1955 in Lynwood, California. He attended Dominguez High School in Compton, California, and Arizona State University. At Arizona State, he played at the designated hitter position in 1975, as a second baseman in 1976, and the center fielder in 1977. As a senior co-captain, he led the 1977 Arizona State Sun Devils baseball team with a .426 batting average, and helped the team to a national championship by defeating South Carolina in the 1977 College World Series.

== Professional baseball ==
=== Detroit Tigers ===
Peters was selected by the Detroit Tigers in the 1977 amateur draft. He played in the Tigers' farm system for the Montgomery Rebels in 1977 and for the Evansville Triplets in 1978 and 1979.

During the 1979 season, he compiled a .320 batting average, .436 on-base percentage, 17 doubles, 10 triples, and 30 stolen bases in 387 at-bats. He helped lead the 1979 Evansville team, managed by Jim Leyland, to the American Association championship. Other future major leaguers on the 1979 Evansville team included Kirk Gibson, Jack Morris, Dan Petry, and Tom Brookens.

Peters was called up to the Tigers (along with Kirk Gibson) in early September 1979. He made his major league debut on September 8, 1979, and appeared in 12 games in the final month of the season. He started three games at third base and three games as the team's designated hitter and also appeared in two games at second base. He impressed manager Sparky Anderson both with his poised batting style and his range in the field.

In 1980, he took over as the Tigers' starting center fielder when Kirk Gibson was injured in mid-June. He appeared in 133 games for the 1980 Tigers, 92 as the starting center fielder and compiled a .291 batting average and .369 on-base percentage with 19 doubles (19), seven triples, and 13 stolen bases. After the season, Peters was honored as Tigers Rookie of the Year.

Peters returned to the Tigers in 1981 though his playing time was limited to 63 games and only 32 games as the team's starting center fielder. He compiled a .256 batting average.

In the spring of 1982, Peters underwent surgery to repair a nerve in his right arm that had slipped out of its normal channel through the elbow. He was released by the Tigers after missing the entire 1982 season.

=== Oakland A's ===
In 1983, Peters signed with the Oakland Athletics. He appeared in 55 games for the 1983 A's, including 42 games as a starter in the outfield. He compiled a .287 batting average and had four stolen bases against nine times in which he was caught stealing.

Peters spent part of the 1983 season and all of the 1984 season with the Tacoma Tigers in the Pacific Coast League. He had a final stint in the majors during the 1986 season, appearing in 44 games with the Oakland A's, principally as a pinch hitter. He compiled a .184 average with the 1986 A's and appeared in his final major league game on June 29, 1986. He continued to play for Tacoma in 1985 and 1986.

In five major league seasons, Peters appeared in 307 games and compiled a .277 batting average (.356 on-base percentage) with two home runs, 34 doubles, 10 triples, 80 RBIs, and 20 stolen bases.

== Later years ==
After retiring as a player, Peters worked briefly as a roving instructor for the Houston Astros. He also served as the manager of the Auburn Astros in 1990, leading the team to a 31-46 record and then spent 1991 and 1992 seasons as the hitting coach of the Burlington Astros.

in 1990, Peters played for the Sun City Rays of the short-lived Senior Professional Baseball Association. Among his teammates were Baseball Hall-of-Famers Rollie Fingers and Ferguson Jenkins.

As of 1995, he was living in Tempe, Arizona, and working for the city's parks and recreation department.

== Death ==
Peters died in Maricopa, Arizona, at the age of 69 on March 9, 2025.
