= 1977 NCAA Division I baseball tournament =

- Season: 1977
- Teams: 34
- Finals site: Johnny Rosenblatt Stadium; Omaha, Nebraska
- Champions: Arizona State (4th title)
- Runner-up: South Carolina (2nd CWS Appearance)
- Winning coach: Jim Brock (1st title)
- MOP: Bob Horner (Arizona State)
- Television: Home Box Office (championship game)

The 1977 NCAA Division I baseball tournament was played at the end of the 1977 NCAA Division I baseball season to determine the national champion of college baseball. The tournament concluded with eight teams competing in the College World Series, a double-elimination tournament in its thirty-first year. Eight regional competitions were held to determine the participants in the final event. Seven regions held a four team, double-elimination tournament while one region included six teams, resulting in 34 teams participating in the tournament at the conclusion of their regular season, and in some cases, after a conference tournament. The thirty-first tournament's champion was Arizona State, coached by Jim Brock. The Most Outstanding Player was Bob Horner of Arizona State.

== Regionals ==
The opening rounds of the tournament were played across eight regional sites across the country, seven consisting of four teams and one of six teams. The winners of each Regional advanced to the College World Series.

Bold indicates winner.

=== Atlantic Regional at Columbia, SC ===
Upper round 1
**Wake Forest**	**6**
East Carolina	3
**South Alabama**	**7**
South Carolina	6
Lower round 1
East Carolina	1
**South Carolina**	**4**

Upper final
**Wake Forest**	**9**
South Alabama	6
Lower final
South Alabama	2
**South Carolina**	**11**

Final
Wake Forest	2	1
**South Carolina**	**5**	**6**

=== Mideast Regional at Minneapolis, MN ===
Upper round 1
**Central Michigan**	**2**
Virginia Tech	1
**Minnesota**	**7**
Florida	0
Lower round 1
Virginia Tech	4
**Florida**	**9**

Upper final
Central Michigan	2
**Minnesota**	**13**
Lower final
Central Michigan	11
**Florida**	**13**

Final
**Minnesota**	**5**	—
Florida	1	—

=== Midwest Regional at Norman, OK ===
Upper round 1
**Southern Illinois**	**4**
Texas A&M	1
**Oklahoma**	**3**
Michigan	1
Lower round 1
Texas A&M	4
**Michigan**	**13**

Upper final
**Southern Illinois**	**7**
Oklahoma	3
Lower final
Oklahoma	2
**Michigan**	**5**

Final
**Southern Illinois**	**9**	—
Michigan	0	—

=== Northeast Regional at Storrs, CT ===
First round
1	**Cornell**	**10***
6	St. John's	7*
2	**Catholic**	**4**
5	Seton Hall	3
3	**Temple**	**9**
4	Connecticut	7

Second round
**Cornell**	**9**
Connecticut	7
Catholic	3
**Temple**	**10**
**St. John's**	**3**
Seton Hall	2

Third round
Cornell	6
**Temple**	**9**
Catholic	3
**St. John's**	**8**

Semifinals
Cornell	9
**St. John's**	**11**

Final
**Temple**	**8**	—
St. John's	6	—

=== Rocky Mountain Regional at Tempe, AZ ===
Upper round 1
**Washington State**	**8**
Portland State	7
**Arizona State**	**6**
Cal State Fullerton	2
Lower round 1
Portland State	3
**Cal State Fullerton**	**5**

Upper final
Washington State	7
**Arizona State**	**11**
Lower final
**Washington State**	**6**
Cal State Fullerton	5

Final
**Arizona State**	**3**	—
Washington State	2	—

=== South Regional at Coral Gables, FL ===
Upper round 1
**Clemson**	**8**
Ole Miss	7
**Miami (FL)**	**6**
Morehead State	1
Lower round 1
**Ole Miss**	**5**
Morehead State	2

Upper final
**Clemson**	**7**
Miami (FL)	2
Lower final
Ole Miss	2
**Miami (FL)**	5

Final
**Clemson**	3	**10**
Miami (FL)	**10**	9

=== South Central Regional at Arlington, TX ===
Upper round 1
**Miami (OH)**	**1**
Lamar	0
**Baylor**	**10**
New Orleans	1
Lower round 1
Lamar	2
**New Orleans**	5

Upper final
**Miami (OH)**	**7**
Baylor	3
Lower final
**Baylor**	**7**
New Orleans	1

Final
Miami (OH)	7	0
**Baylor**	**12**	**2**

=== West Regional at Honolulu, HI ===
Upper round 1
**Fresno State**	**7**
Cal State Los Angeles	4
**Southern California**	**6**
Hawaii	1
Lower round 1
**Cal State Los Angeles**	**8**
Hawaii	4

Upper final
Fresno State	3
**Southern California**	**7**
Lower final
**Cal State Los Angeles**	**15**
Fresno State	11

Final
Southern California	5	6
**Cal State Los Angeles**	**6**	**7**

== College World Series ==
=== Participants ===
School	Conference	Record (conference)	Head coach	CWS appearances	CWS best finish	CWS record
Arizona State	WAC	52–11 (15–3)	Jim Brock	8 (last: 1976)	1st (1965, 1967, 1969)	29–13
Baylor	SWC	43–13 (15–9)	Mickey Sullivan	0 (last: none)	none	0–0
Clemson	ACC	41–8 (9–1)	Bill Wilhelm	3 (last: 1976)	5th (1958, 1959, 1976)	3–6
Cal State Los Angeles	SCBA	40–20 (17–7)	Jack Deutsch	0 (last: none)	none	0–0
Minnesota	Big 10	38–10 (15–3)	Dick Siebert	4 (last: 1973)	1st (1956, 1960, 1964)	16–5
South Carolina	Independent	40–10–1	June Raines	1 (last: 1975)	2nd (1975)	4–2
Southern Illinois	MVC	38–10 (n/a)	Richard Jones	4 (last: 1974)	2nd (1968, 1971)	9–8
Temple	East Coast Conference	34–7 (n/a)	Skip Wilson	1 (last: 1972)	3rd (1972)	2–2

=== Results ===
==== Bracket ====
Upper round 1
Southern Illinois	10
Temple	5
Arizona State	10
Clemson	7
Cal State Los Angeles	7
Minnesota	4
South Carolina	3^{10}
Baylor	2

Upper round 2
Southern Illinois	3
Arizona State	2
Cal State Los Angeles	2
South Carolina	6
Lower round 1
Temple	4
Clemson	13
Minnesota	4^{11}
Baylor	3

Upper final
Southern Illinois	4
South Carolina	5
Lower round 2
Cal State Los Angeles	1
Clemson	0
Arizona State	8
Minnesota	4

Semifinals
South Carolina	2
Arizona State	6
Southern Illinois	9
Cal State Los Angeles	7

Preliminary final
Arizona State	10
Southern Illinois	0

Final
South Carolina	1
Arizona State	2

==== Game results ====
Date	Game	Winner	Score	Loser	Notes
June 10	Game 1	Southern Illinois	10–5	Temple	
June 10	Game 2	Arizona State	10–7	Clemson	
June 11	Game 3	Cal State Los Angeles	7–4	Minnesota	
June 11	Game 4	South Carolina	3–2 (10 innings)	Baylor	
June 11	Game 5	Clemson	13–4	Temple	Temple eliminated
June 12	Game 6	Minnesota	4–3 (11 innings)	Baylor	Baylor eliminated
June 13	Game 7	Southern Illinois	3–2	Arizona State	
June 13	Game 8	South Carolina	6–2	Cal State Los Angeles	
June 14	Game 9	Arizona State	8–4	Minnesota	Minnesota eliminated
June 14	Game 10	Cal State Los Angeles	1–0	Clemson	Clemson eliminated
June 15	Game 11	South Carolina	5–4	Southern Illinois	
June 16	Game 12	Southern Illinois	9–7	Cal State Los Angeles	Cal State Los Angeles eliminated
June 16	Game 13	Arizona State	6–2	South Carolina	
June 17	Game 14	Arizona State	10–0	Southern Illinois	Southern Illinois eliminated
June 18	Final	Arizona State	2–1	South Carolina	Arizona State wins CWS

=== All-Tournament Team ===
The following players were members of the All-Tournament Team.

Position	Player	School
P	Randy Martz	South Carolina
P	Jerry Vasquez	Arizona State
C	Steve Stieb	Southern Illinois
1B	Chris Nyman	Arizona State
2B	Bob Horner (MOP)	Arizona State
3B	Brandt Humphry	Arizona State
SS	Mike Henderson	Arizona State
OF	Chuck McLean	South Carolina
OF	Mookie Wilson	South Carolina
OF	David Caldwell	Clemson
DH	Jamie Allen	Arizona State

=== Notable players ===
- Arizona State: Jamie Allen, Chris Bando, Hubie Brooks, Bob Horner, Dave Hudgens, Darrell Jackson, Chris Nyman, Bob Pate, Rick Peters, Patt Rooney, Thomas Hawk
- Baylor: Andy Beene, Jaime Cocanower, Fritzie Connally, Steve Macko
- Cal State Los Angeles: Darrell Brown, Alfredo Esparza
- Clemson: Ron Musselman, Bill Schroeder, Brian Snyder
- Minnesota: Brian Denman, Paul Molitor, Jerry Ujdur
- South Carolina: Jim Lewis, Ed Lynch, Randy Martz, Mookie Wilson
- Southern Illinois: Neil Fiala, Rickey Keeton, Bill Lyons, Dewey Robinson, George Vukovich
- Temple: Pete Filson

== See also ==
- 1977 NCAA Division II baseball tournament
- 1977 NCAA Division III baseball tournament
- 1977 NAIA World Series
