= 1977 ACC tournament =

1977 ACC tournament may refer to:

- 1977 ACC men's basketball tournament
- 1977 Atlantic Coast Conference baseball tournament
