= Jamie Allen (baseball) =

American baseball player (born 1958)

- Third baseman
- Born: May 29, 1958 (age 67); Yakima, Washington, U.S.
- Batted: Right Threw: Right

MLB debut
- May 1, 1983, for the Seattle Mariners

Last MLB appearance
- September 4, 1983, for the Seattle Mariners

MLB statistics
- Batting average: .223
- Home runs: 4
- Runs batted in: 21
- Stats at Baseball Reference

Teams
- Seattle Mariners (1983)

James Bradley Allen (born May 29, 1958) is an American former professional baseball third baseman for the Seattle Mariners of the Major League Baseball (MLB). He attended Arizona State University.

== Amateur career ==
Allen was drafted by the Minnesota Twins in the first round of the 1976 MLB draft out of A.C. Davis High School in Yakima, Washington but chose to attend Arizona State. He batted over .300 in 1977 and 1978, as the Sun Devils won the 1977 College World Series.

== Professional career ==
The Seattle Mariners drafted Allen in the second round of the 1979 MLB draft. He began his professional career that summer, playing for the Bellingham Mariners of the Northwest League. During an exhibition game in 1982, as a member of the Triple-A Salt Lake City Gulls, Jamie drew a walk to win the game against the major league Seattle Mariners.

Allen was placed on the Mariners' 40-man roster on November 6, 1982, as general manager Dan O'Brien added more younger players to the roster.

Allen made his MLB debut on May 1, 1983 at the Kingdome against the Baltimore Orioles. He went 1-for-4 in the game. In his only big league season, Allen hit .223 with four home runs, ten doubles and 21 RBIs in 86 games. He had surgery that offseason on the rotator cuff in his right shoulder. He continued to play professionally until 1985, finishing his career with the Calgary Cannons of the Pacific Coast League. He injured his shoulder again in 1985 after tripping over teammate Kevin King and landing on the hard artificial turf.
