= 1977 NCAA Division I baseball rankings =

1977 NCAA Division I baseball season

Tournament

College World Series
- Champions: Arizona State
- Runners-up: South Carolina
- MOP: Bob Horner (Arizona State)

Seasons
- ← 1976 1978 →

The following poll makes up the 1977 NCAA Division I baseball rankings. Collegiate Baseball Newspaper published its first human poll of the top 20 teams in college baseball in 1957, and expanded to rank the top 30 teams in 1961.

== Collegiate Baseball ==
Currently, only the final poll from the 1977 season is available.

Rank	Team
1	Arizona State
2	South Carolina
3	Southern Illinois
4	Cal State Los Angeles
5	Clemson
6	Minnesota
7	Baylor
8	Temple
9	Miami (FL)
10	USC
11	Washington State
12	South Alabama
13	Florida
14	Wake Forest
15	Miami (OH)
16	Texas A&M
17	St. John's
18	Texas
19	Michigan
20	Cal State Fullerton
21	Fresno State
22	Cornell
23	Hawaii
24	San Diego State
25	Saint Mary's
26	Seton Hall
27	Oklahoma
28	Connecticut
29	New Orleans
30	Lamar
