= 1977 Clemson Tigers baseball team =

Clemson University baseball team season

1977 Clemson Tigers baseball

ACC champions South Regional champions

College World Series, 1–2
- Conference: Atlantic Coast Conference
- CB: No. 5
- Record: 42–10 (9–1 ACC)
- Head coach: Bill Wilhelm
- Home stadium: Beautiful Tiger Field

1977 Atlantic Coast Conference baseball standings
	Conf.				Overall
Team	W		L	PCT	W		L	PCT
No. 5 Clemson ‍†‍‍^{y}	9	–	1	.900	42	–	10	.808
Maryland ‍‍‍	7	–	4	.636	14	–	12	.538
No. 14 Wake Forest ‍‍‡‍^{y}	7	–	5	.583	31	–	13	.705
North Carolina ‍‍‍	6	–	6	.500	18	–	17	.514
NC State ‍‍‍	5	–	5	.500	27	–	12	.692
Duke ‍‍‍	1	–	7	.125	9	–	16	.360
Virginia ‍‍‍	1	–	8	.111	11	–	22	.333
† – Conference champion ‡ – Tournament champion y – Invited to the NCAA tournament As of June 30, 1977; Rankings from Collegiate Baseball

The 1977 Clemson Tigers baseball team represented Clemson University in the 1977 NCAA Division I baseball season. The team played their home games at Beautiful Tiger Field in Clemson, South Carolina.

The team was coached by Bill Wilhelm, who completed his twentieth season at Clemson. The Tigers reached the 1977 College World Series, their fourth appearance in Omaha.

== Roster ==
1977 Clemson Tigers roster
Pitchers: - David Malkmus; - Tony Masone; - Houston Matthews; - Ron Musselman - Senior; - Tommy Qualters - Junior; - Randy Quintrell - Senior; - Paul Schmitt; - Brian Snyder - Freshman; - Mike Sullivan; - Billy Trapp; - Dave Woessner	Catchers: - Bill Foley - Junior; Infielders: - Robert Bonnette - Sophomore; - Steven Nilsson - Junior; - Pete Peltz - Junior; - Billy Wingo - Senior; Outfielders: - Dave Caldwell - Junior; - Neil Simons - Freshman; - Billy Weems - Freshman	Unknown: - Alan Hoover; - Pete Khoury; - Bill Schroeder - Freshman; - Gene Wisniewski

== Schedule ==
Legend
	Clemson win
	Clemson loss
**Bold**	Clemson team member
*	Non-Conference game

1977 Clemson Tigers baseball game log
Regular season

February/March
Date	Opponent	Site/stadium	Score	Overall record	ACC record
Feb 26	at Columbus*	Columbus, GA	**W** 12–2^{7}	1–0	
Feb 26	at Columbus*	Columbus, GA	**W** 13–5^{7}	2–0	
Mar 1	High Point*	Beautiful Tiger Field • Clemson, SC	**W** 10–1	3–0	
Mar 2	High Point*	Beautiful Tiger Field • Clemson, SC	**W** 10–0	4–0	
Mar 3	at Georgia*	Foley Field • Athens, GA	**W** 2–1	5–0	
Mar 5	Duke	Beautiful Tiger Field • Clemson, SC	**W** 6–0	6–0	1–0
Mar 8	James Madison*	Beautiful Tiger Field • Clemson, SC	**W** 6–2^{7}	7–0	
Mar 8	James Madison*	Beautiful Tiger Field • Clemson, SC	**W** 10–3	8–0	
Mar 9	Mercer*	Beautiful Tiger Field • Clemson, SC	**W** 3–0	9–0	
Mar 10	Mercer*	Beautiful Tiger Field • Clemson, SC	**W** 8–6	10–0	
Mar 11	Marshall*	Beautiful Tiger Field • Clemson, SC	**W** 5–2	11–0	
Mar 12	at The Citadel*	College Park • Charleston, SC	**W** 5–2	12–0	
Mar 14	at Baptist*	North Charleston, SC	**W** 8–0	13–0	
Mar 15	at Baptist*	North Charleston, SC	**W** 3–1	14–0	
Mar 16	at Francis Marion*	Florence, SC	**W** 8–6	15–0	
Mar 17	at UNC Wilmington*	Wilmington, NC	**W** 8–0 (Note: No-hitter)	16–0	
Mar 18	at UNC Wilmington*	Wilmington, NC	**W** 4–1	17–0	
Mar 19	at Wake Forest	Ernie Shore Field • Winston-Salem, NC	**W** 11–6	18–0	2–0
Mar 20	at Wake Forest	Ernie Shore Field • Winston-Salem, NC	**W** 13–12	19–0	3–0
Mar 22	Toledo*	Beautiful Tiger Field • Clemson, SC	**W** 8–1	20–0	
Mar 23	Toledo*	Beautiful Tiger Field • Clemson, SC	**W** 10–3^{7}	21–0	
Mar 23	Toledo*	Beautiful Tiger Field • Clemson, SC	**W** 6–5^{7}	22–0	
Mar 24	Toledo*	Beautiful Tiger Field • Clemson, SC	**W** 5–3^{7}	23–0	
Mar 24	Toledo*	Beautiful Tiger Field • Clemson, SC	**W** 13–0^{7}	24–0	
Mar 26	Lewis*	Beautiful Tiger Field • Clemson, SC	**W** 3–0	25–0	
Mar 27	Lewis*	Beautiful Tiger Field • Clemson, SC	**W** 9–8	26–0	
Mar 28	South Carolina*	Beautiful Tiger Field • Clemson, SC	**L** 1–2	26–1	

April
Date	Opponent	Site/stadium	Score	Overall record	ACC record
Apr 1	Newberry*	Beautiful Tiger Field • Clemson, SC	**L** 3–6	26–2	
Apr 2	NC State	Beautiful Tiger Field • Clemson, SC	**W** 7–3	27–2	4–0
Apr 6	Georgia*	Beautiful Tiger Field • Clemson, SC	**W** 2–0	28–2	
Apr 7	Erskine*	Beautiful Tiger Field • Clemson, SC	**W** 13–0	29–2	
Apr 8	Georgia Tech*	Beautiful Tiger Field • Clemson, SC	**W** 8–7	30–2	
Apr 9	North Carolina	Beautiful Tiger Field • Clemson, SC	**W** 14–0	31–2	5–0
Apr 10	North Carolina	Beautiful Tiger Field • Clemson, SC	**W** 9–3	32–2	6–0
Apr 12	at South Carolina*	Columbia, SC	**L** 6–7^{7}	32–3	
Apr 12	at South Carolina*	Columbia, SC	**L** 2–7^{7}	32–4	
Apr 14	at Maryland	Shipley Field • College Park, MD	**L** 9–12^{10}	32–5	6–1
Apr 15	at Maryland	Shipley Field • College Park, MD	**W** 9–6	33–5	7–1
Apr 16	at Virginia	Charlottesville, VA	**W** 8–3	34–5	8–1
Apr 17	at Virginia	Charlottesville, VA	**W** 26–4	35–5	9–1
Apr 19	at Wofford*	Spartanburg, SC	**W** 2–0	36–5	

Postseason

ACC Tournament
Date	Opponent	Site/stadium	Score	Overall record	ACCT record
Apr 22	NC State	Beautiful Tiger Field • Clemson, SC	**W** 10–3	37–5	1–0
Apr 23	Wake Forest	Beautiful Tiger Field • Clemson, SC	**L** 4–5	37–6	1–1
Apr 24	NC State	Beautiful Tiger Field • Clemson, SC	**W** 14–6	38–6	2–1
Apr 24	Wake Forest	Beautiful Tiger Field • Clemson, SC	**L** 9–22	38–7	2–2

NCAA South Regional
Date	Opponent	Site/stadium	Score	Overall record	Regional record
May 20	Ole Miss	Mark Light Field • Coral Gables, FL	**W** 8–7	39–7	1–0
May 21	Miami (FL)	Mark Light Field • Coral Gables, FL	**W** 7–2	40–7	2–0
May 22	Miami (FL)	Mark Light Field • Coral Gables, FL	**L** 3–10	40–8	2–1
May 22	Miami (FL)	Mark Light Field • Coral Gables, FL	**W** 10–9	41–8	3–1

NCAA College World Series
Date	Opponent	Site/stadium	Score	Overall record	CWS record
June 10	Arizona State	Johnny Rosenblatt Stadium • Omaha, NE	**L** 7–10	41–9	0–1
June 11	Temple	Johnny Rosenblatt Stadium • Omaha, NE	**W** 13–4	42–9	1–1
June 14	Cal State Los Angeles	Johnny Rosenblatt Stadium • Omaha, NE	**L** 0–1	42–10	1–2
