= 1977 South Carolina Gamecocks baseball team =

American college baseball season

1977 South Carolina Gamecocks baseball

Atlantic Regional Champions

College World Series, Runner-Up
- Conference: Independent
- Record: 43–12–1
- Head coach: June Raines (1st season)
- Assistant coach: Johnny Hunton
- Home stadium: Gamecock Baseball Stadium

The 1977 South Carolina Gamecocks baseball team represented the University of South Carolina in the 1977 NCAA Division I baseball season. The Gamecocks played their home games at the new Gamecock Baseball Field. The team was coached by June Raines in his first season at South Carolina.

The Gamecocks lost the College World Series, defeated by the Arizona State Sun Devils in the championship game.

== Roster ==
1977 South Carolina Gamecocks roster
Pitchers: 27 Jamie Chakales; 25 Ronnie Crapps; 18 Hal Hutchens; 9 Kevin Karcher; 15 Mark Kish; 26 Jim Lewis; 23 Ed Lynch; 21 Randy Martz; 2 Tom Sotack; 20 Scott Thomas; 17 Mike Toalson	Catchers: 7 Johnny Long; 6 Richard Ness; 5 Robbie Parrish; Infielders: 22 Johnny Hinkel; 14 Greg Jonson; 13 Steve King; 24 Bart Murphy; 10 Mark Van Bever; 1 Tom Williams	Outfielders: 11 Eric Hiltebeitel; 4 Chuck McLean; 19 Don Repsher; 12 David Small; 8 Mookie Wilson

== Schedule and results ==
Legend
South Carolina win
South Carolina loss
South Carolina tie

1977 South Carolina Gamecocks baseball game log
Regular season (36–9–1)
March (15–5–1)

Date	Opponent	Site/stadium	Score	Overall Record
March 1	Coastal Caroliana	Gamecock Baseball Stadium • Columbia, SC	11–0	1–0
March 2	at Baptist	Unknown • Charleston, SC	1–2	1–1
March 6	James Madison	Gamecock Baseball Stadium • Columbia, SC	2–1	2–1
March 7	Old Dominion	Gamecock Baseball Stadium • Columbia, SC	8–3	3–1
March 8	Virginia Tech	Gamecock Baseball Stadium • Columbia, SC	10–0	4–1
March 9	Virginia Tech	Gamecock Baseball Stadium • Columbia, SC	1–0	5–1
March 10	Augusta	Gamecock Baseball Stadium • Columbia, SC	6–1	6–1
March 11	Liberty Baptist	Gamecock Baseball Stadium • Columbia, SC	14–0	7–1
March 12	Virginia	Gamecock Baseball Stadium • Columbia, SC	8–2	8–1
March 14	at South Florida	Red McEwen Field • Tampa, FL	10–4	9–1
March 15	vs Kentucky	Red McEwen Field • Tampa, FL	14–5	10–1
March 16	vs Tampa	Red McEwen Field • Tampa, FL	8–8	10–1–1
March 17	at Eckerd	Unknown • St. Petersburg, FL	5–9	10–2–1
March 18	at Eckerd	Unknown • St. Petersburg, FL	1–11	10–3–1
March 19	at Florida Southern	Henley Field • Lakeland, FL	3–8	10–4–1
March 22	Cincinnati	Gamecock Baseball Stadium • Columbia, SC	9–4	11–4–1
March 23	SIU Edwardsville	Gamecock Baseball Stadium • Columbia, SC	5–2	12–4–1
March 24	at Francis Marion	Unknown • Florence, SC	12–10	13–4–1
March 25	North Carolina	Gamecock Baseball Stadium • Columbia, SC	2–3	13–5–1
March 26	North Carolina	Gamecock Baseball Stadium • Columbia, SC	6–9	13–6–1
March 28	at Clemson	Beautiful Tiger Field • Clemson, SC	2–1	14–6–1
March 31	Furman	Gamecock Baseball Stadium • Columbia, SC	13–6	15–6–1

April (18–3)

Date	Opponent	Site/stadium	Score	Overall Record
April 1	at Mercer	Claude Smith Field • Macon, GA	2–0	16–6–1
April 2	at Mercer	Claude Smith Field • Macon, GA	4–3	17–6–1
April 5	Mercer	Gamecock Baseball Stadium • Columbia, SC	17–2	18–6–1
April 6	Mercer	Gamecock Baseball Stadium • Columbia, SC	6–2	19–6–1
April 7	at North Carolina	Boshamer Stadium • Chapel Hill, NC	3–0	20–6–1
April 9	Jacksonville	Gamecock Baseball Stadium • Columbia, SC	1–3	20–7–1
April 9	Jacksonville	Gamecock Baseball Stadium • Columbia, SC	4–2	21–7–1
April 12	Clemson	Gamecock Baseball Stadium • Columbia, SC	7–6	22–7–1
April 12	Clemson	Gamecock Baseball Stadium • Columbia, SC	7–2	23–7–1
April 14	Newberry	Gamecock Baseball Stadium • Columbia, SC	16–10	24–7–1
April 15	Georgia Southern	Gamecock Baseball Stadium • Columbia, SC	5–2	25–7–1
April 16	Georgia Southern	Gamecock Baseball Stadium • Columbia, SC	7–3	26–7–1
April 18	Pfeiffer	Gamecock Baseball Stadium • Columbia, SC	5–4	27–7–1
April 19	at The Citadel	College Park • Charleston, SC	3–4	27–8–1
April 21	Wofford	Gamecock Baseball Stadium • Columbia, SC	5–0	28–8–1
April 22	Tennessee	Gamecock Baseball Stadium • Columbia, SC	7–2	29–8–1
April 25	at Georgia Southern	J.I. Clements Field • Statesboro, GA	3–4	29–9–1
April 25	at Georgia Southern	J.I. Clements Field • Statesboro, GA	9–1	30–9–1
April 26	The Citadel	Gamecock Baseball Stadium • Columbia, SC	10–4	31–9–1
April 28	at Ferman	Ferman Baseball Stadium • Greenville, SC	5–0	32–9–1
April 30	Baptist	Gamecock Baseball Stadium • Columbia, SC	14–0	33–9–1

May (3–0)

Date	Opponent	Site/stadium	Score	Overall Record
May 5	at Georgia	Foley Field • Athens, GA	8–2	34–9–1
May 6	at Georgia Tech	Rose Bowl Field • Atlanta, GA	8–2	35–9–1
May 7	at Georgia Tech	Rose Bowl Field • Atlanta, GA	9–8	36–9–1

Postseason (7–3)
Atlantic Regional (4–1)

Date	Opponent	Site/stadium	Score	Overall Record
May 20	South Alabama	Gamecocks Baseball Stadium • Columbia, SC	6–7	36–10–1
May 21	East Carolina	Gamecocks Baseball Stadium • Columbia, SC	4–1	37–10–1
May 22	South Alabama	Gamecocks Baseball Stadium • Columbia, SC	11–2	38–10–1
May 22	Wake Forest	Gamecocks Baseball Stadium • Columbia, SC	5–2	39–10–1
May 23	Wake Forest	Gamecocks Baseball Stadium • Columbia, SC	6–1	40–10–1

1977 College World Series (3–2)

Date	Opponent	Site/stadium	Score	Overall Record
June 11	vs Baylor	Johnny Rosenblatt Stadium • Omaha, NE	3–2	41–10–1
June 13	vs Cal State Los Angeles	Johnny Rosenblatt Stadium • Omaha, NE	6–2	42–10–1
June 15	vs Southern Illinois	Johnny Rosenblatt Stadium • Omaha, NE	5–4	43–10–1
June 16	vs Arizona State	Johnny Rosenblatt Stadium • Omaha, NE	2–6	43–11–1
June 18	vs Arizona State	Johnny Rosenblatt Stadium • Omaha, NE	1–2	43–12–1

Schedule Source:

== Awards and honors ==
Chuck McLean

- All Tournament Team

Mookie Wilson

- All Tournament Team

Randy Martz

- All Tournament Team

== Gamecocks in the 1977 MLB draft ==
The following members of the South Carolina Gamecocks baseball program were drafted in the 1977 Major League Baseball draft.

Round	Pick	Player	Position	MLB Club
1	12	Randy Martz	P	Chicago Cubs
2	42	Mookie Wilson	OF	New York Mets
7	175	Mark Van Bever	2B	Baltimore Orioles
22	547	Ed Lynch	P	Texas Rangers
