= 1977 Atlantic Coast Conference baseball tournament =

American college baseball tournament

- Teams: 7
- Format: Seven-team double-elimination tournament
- Finals site: Beautiful Tiger Field; Clemson, South Carolina
- Champions: Wake Forest (1st title)
- Winning coach: Marvin Crater (1st title)
- Attendance: 7,100

1977 Atlantic Coast Conference baseball standings
	Conf.				Overall
Team	W		L	PCT	W		L	PCT
No. 5 Clemson ‍†‍‍^{y}	9	–	1	.900	42	–	10	.808
Maryland ‍‍‍	7	–	4	.636	14	–	12	.538
No. 14 Wake Forest ‍‍‡‍^{y}	7	–	5	.583	31	–	13	.705
North Carolina ‍‍‍	6	–	6	.500	18	–	17	.514
NC State ‍‍‍	5	–	5	.500	27	–	12	.692
Duke ‍‍‍	1	–	7	.125	9	–	16	.360
Virginia ‍‍‍	1	–	8	.111	11	–	22	.333
† – Conference champion ‡ – Tournament champion y – Invited to the NCAA tournament As of June 30, 1977; Rankings from Collegiate Baseball

The 1977 Atlantic Coast Conference baseball tournament was held at Beautiful Tiger Field in Clemson, South Carolina, from April 24 through 27. Wake Forest won the tournament and earned the Atlantic Coast Conference's automatic bid to the 1977 NCAA Division I baseball tournament.

== Tournament ==
Play-In Rd. (Single Elim.)	Upper round 2	Upper final	Championship
5	NC State	3
1	Clemson	10
5	NC State	6
4	North Carolina	5
3	Wake Forest	5
1	Clemson	4
6	Duke	1
3	Wake Forest	2
2	Maryland	7
3	Wake Forest	10
7	Virginia	1
2	Maryland	4
1	Clemson	9	—
3	Wake Forest	22	—
Lower round 1	Lower final
5	NC State	6
5	NC State	6	1	Clemson	14
2	Maryland	2

== See also ==
- College World Series
- NCAA Division I Baseball Championship
