= 1977 Cal State Los Angeles Golden Eagles baseball team =

American college baseball season

1977 Cal State Los Angeles Golden Eagles baseball

SCBA regular season

College World Series, 4th
- Conference: Southern California Baseball Association
- Record: 42–22 (17–7 SCBA)
- Head coach: Jack Deutsch (1st season)
- Home stadium: Reeder Field

1977 Southern California Baseball Association standings
	Conf.						Overall
Team	W		L		T	PCT	W		L		T	PCT
No. 4 Cal State Los Angeles ‍†‍‍^{y}	42	–	22	–	0	.656	17	–	7	–	0	.708
No. 20 Cal State Fullerton ‍†‍‍^{y}	44	–	14	–	0	.759	17	–	7	–	0	.708
San Diego State ‍‍‍	49	–	16	–	1	.750	16	–	8	–	0	.667
Pepperdine ‍‍‍	23	–	27	–	2	.462	12	–	11	–	1	.521
Loyola Marymount ‍‍‍	20	–	33	–	0	.377	10	–	14	–	0	.417
UC Santa Barbara ‍‍‍	18	–	25	–	0	.419	7	–	17	–	0	.292
Long Beach State ‍‍‍	11	–	43	–	1	.209	4	–	19	–	1	.188
† – Conference champion y – Invited to the NCAA tournament As of June 30, 1977; Rankings from Collegiate Baseball

The 1977 Cal State Los Angeles Golden Eagles baseball team is a baseball team that represented California State University, Los Angeles in the 1977 NCAA Division I baseball season. The Golden Eagles were members of the Southern California Baseball Association and played their home games at Reeder Field in Los Angeles, California. They were led by first-year head coach Jack Deutsch.

== Roster ==
1977 Cal State Los Angeles Golden Eagles baseball team
Players
Coaches

#	Pos.	Name	B/T	Height	Weight	Year	Home town
	OF	Gary Adair	L/L	6 ft 0 in (1.83 m)	170 lb (77 kg)
	INF	Darnell Barnett	R/R	6 ft 2 in (1.88 m)	195 lb (88 kg)	Sr
	OF	Darrell Brown	S/R	6 ft 0 in (1.83 m)	184 lb (83 kg)		Oklahoma City, Oklahoma
		Chris Carstensen	L/R	6 ft 2 in (1.88 m)	180 lb (82 kg)
	P	Al Esparza	/	—	—
	INF	Javier Fierro	R/R	5 ft 10 in (1.78 m)	185 lb (84 kg)		El Paso, Texas
	LHP	Jack Hills	L/L	6 ft 2 in (1.88 m)	200 lb (91 kg)	Jr
	INF	John Macauley	/	—	—
	RHP	Alfredo Martínez	R/R	6 ft 3 in (1.91 m)	185 lb (84 kg)		Los Angeles, California

Head coach

Jack Deutsch

Assistant coach(es)

Legend

- (C) Team captain
- (S) Suspended
- (I) Ineligible
- Injured
- Current redshirt

== Schedule ==
1977 Cal State Los Angeles Golden Eagles baseball game log
Regular season
February (5–6)

#	Date	Opponent	Site/stadium	Score	Overall record	SCBA record
1	February	vs Cal Lutheran	Unknown • Unknown, California	4–2	1–0	–
2	February 18	USC	Reeder Field • Los Angeles, California	0–7	1–1	–
3	February	vs Whittier	Unknown • Unknown, California	18–5	2–1	–
4	February	vs Whittier	Unknown • Unknown, California	7–3	3–1	–
5	February	vs Cal Poly	Unknown • Unknown, California	6–5	4–1	–
6	February	vs Cal Poly	Unknown • Unknown, California	1–10	4–2	–
7	February	vs Cal Poly	Unknown • Unknown, California	5–6	4–3	–
8	February	Cal State Northridge	Reeder Field • Los Angeles, California	12–7	5–3	–
9	February 26	UCLA	Reeder Field • Los Angeles, California	5–6	5–4	–
10	February 26	UCLA	Reeder Field • Los Angeles, California	1–4	5–5	–
11	February	vs Cal Poly Pomona	Unknown • Unknown, California	10–11	5–6	–

March (9–4)

#	Date	Opponent	Site/stadium	Score	Overall record	SCBA record
12	March 1	at Azusa Pacific	Unknown • Azusa, California	18–8	6–6	–
13	March	Pepperdine	Reeder Field • Los Angeles, California	3–6	6–7	0–1
14	March	UC Santa Barbara	Reeder Field • Los Angeles, California	7–2	7–7	1–1
15	March 7	at Biola	Unknown • La Mirada, California	5–2	8–7	1–1
16	March	vs Chapman	Unknown • Unknown, California	3–0	9–7	1–1
17	March	Cal State Northridge	Reeder Field • Los Angeles, California	12–8	10–7	1–1
18	March 11	Loyola Marymount	Reeder Field • Los Angeles, California	3–4	10–8	1–2
19	March	at Long Beach State	Blair Field • Long Beach, California	16–4	11–8	2–2
20	March 18	at UC Riverside	Unknown • Riverside, California	10–4	12–8	2–2
21	March 19	UC Riverside	Reeder Field • Los Angeles, California	6–10	12–9	2–2
22	March 19	UC Riverside	Reeder Field • Los Angeles, California	3–9	12–10	2–2
23	March	vs Cal State Dominguez Hills	Unknown • Unknown, California	3–1	13–10	2–2
24	March 29	at UC Irvine	Unknown • Irvine, California	11–7	14–10	2–2

April (12–4)

#	Date	Opponent	Site/stadium	Score	Overall record	SCBA record
25	April	vs Chapman	Unknown • Unknown, California	8–2	15–10	2–2
26	April 9	San Diego State	Reeder Field • Los Angeles, California	5–4	16–10	3–2
27	April 9	San Diego State	Reeder Field • Los Angeles, California	3–9	16–11	3–3
28	April 12	at USC	Dedeaux Field • Los Angeles, California	2–15	16–12	3–3
29	April 15	Loyola Marymount	Reeder Field • Los Angeles, California	9–6	17–12	4–3
30	April 16	at Loyola Marymount	Unknown • Los Angeles, California	1–8	17–13	4–4
31	April 16	at Loyola Marymount	Unknown • Los Angeles, California	4–0	18–13	5–4
32	April	Claremont	Unknown • Unknown, California	7–4	19–13	5–4
33	April 22	at Cal State Fullerton	Titan Field • Fullerton, California	2–0	20–13	6–4
34	April 23	Cal State Fullerton	Reeder Field • Los Angeles, California	9–8	21–13	7–4
35	April 23	Cal State Fullerton	Reeder Field • Los Angeles, California	4–1	22–13	8–4
36	April	vs Cal State Dominguez Hills	Unknown • Unknown, California	6–5	23–13	8–4
37	April 27	Biola	Reeder Field • Los Angeles, California	9–3	24–13	8–4
38	April	vs Cal Poly Pomona	Unknown • Unknown, California	10–1	25–13	8–4
39	April 30	at UCLA	Sawtelle Field • Los Angeles, California	1–6	25–14	8–4
40	April 30	at UCLA	Sawtelle Field • Los Angeles, California	5–3	26–14	8–4

May (9–5)

#	Date	Opponent	Site/stadium	Score	Overall record	SCBA record
41	May 1	at UCLA	Sawtelle Field • Los Angeles, California	4–10	26–15	8–4
42	May	vs La Verne	Unknown • Unknown, California	2–7	26–16	8–4
43	May	at Cal State Fullerton	Titan Field • Fullerton, California	1–0	27–16	9–4
44	May	Pepperdine	Reeder Field • Los Angeles, California	2–1	28–16	10–4
45	May	at Long Beach State	Blair Field • Long Beach, California	13–9	29–16	11–4
46	May	Long Beach State	Reeder Field • Los Angeles, California	9–3	30–16	12–4
47	May	Long Beach State	Reeder Field • Los Angeles, California	12–10	31–16	13–4
48	May 17	at San Diego State	Unknown • San Diego, California	7–5	32–16	14–4
49	May 17	at San Diego State	Unknown • San Diego, California	5–3	33–16	15–4
50	May	UC Santa Barbara	Reeder Field • Los Angeles, California	10–5	34–16	16–4
51	May	UC Santa Barbara	Reeder Field • Los Angeles, California	18–8	35–16	17–4
52	May	UC Santa Barbara	Reeder Field • Los Angeles, California	6–9	35–17	17–5
53	May	at Pepperdine	Eddy D. Field Stadium • Malibu, California	0–4	35–18	17–6
54	May	at Pepperdine	Eddy D. Field Stadium • Malibu, California	4–5	35–19	17–7

Postseason
SCBA Tie-breaker (1–0)

#	Date	Opponent	Site/stadium	Score	Overall record	SCBA record
55	May	vs Cal State Fullerton	Unknown • Unknown, California	6–3	36–19	17–7

West Regional (4–1)

#	Date	Opponent	Site/stadium	Score	Overall record	SCBA record
56	May 26	vs Fresno State	UH Stadium • Honolulu, Hawaii	4–7	36–20	17–7
57	May 27	at Hawaii	UH Stadium • Honolulu, Hawaii	8–4	37–20	17–7
58	May 28	vs Fresno State	UH Stadium • Honolulu, Hawaii	15–11	38–20	17–7
59	May 28	vs USC	UH Stadium • Honolulu, Hawaii	6–5	39–20	17–7
60	May 29	vs USC	UH Stadium • Honolulu, Hawaii	7–6	40–20	17–7

1977 College World Series (2–2)

#	Date	Opponent	Site/stadium	Score	Overall record	SCBA record
61	June 11	vs Minnesota	Johnny Rosenblatt Stadium • Omaha, Nebraska	7–4	41–20	17–7
62	June 13	vs South Carolina	Johnny Rosenblatt Stadium • Omaha, Nebraska	2–6	41–21	17–7
63	June 14	vs Clemson	Johnny Rosenblatt Stadium • Omaha, Nebraska	1–0	42–21	17–7
64	June 16	vs Southern Illinois	Johnny Rosenblatt Stadium • Omaha, Nebraska	7–9	42–22	17–7

== Awards and honors ==
Gary Adair

- All-SCBA

Darrell Brown

- All-SCBA

Al Esparza

- All-SCBA

Javier Fierro

- All-SCBA

Jack Hills

- All-SCBA

John Macauley

- All-SCBA
