= Craig Landis =

American baseball player and sports agent (born 1958)

Craig Landis (born December 29, 1958) is an American sports agent and a former professional baseball player. As an agent, he specializes in baseball and represents Los Angeles Angels outfielder Mike Trout.

== Career ==
=== Athlete ===
Craig Landis
- Third baseman
- Born: December 29, 1958 (age 67); Richmond, California, U.S.
- Bats: Right Throws: Right

Craig Landis
Profile
- Position: Defensive back

Career information
- High school: Vintage (CA)
- College: Stanford University (1983–1987)

An All-American in both football and baseball at Vintage High School in Napa, California, Landis was drafted 10th overall by the San Francisco Giants in the first round of the 1977 MLB draft.

He went on to play six seasons of minor league baseball, reaching as high as Triple-A.

After retiring from baseball, Landis accepted a football scholarship to Stanford, where he played defensive back and special teams.

=== Agent ===
Landis earned degrees in economics, and worked on Wall Street before returning to the sports world in 1991, when a friend asked him to represent a high school player in the MLB Draft. He went on to represent players including Paul Konerko, J.J. Hardy, J.J. Putz, Randy Winn and Aaron Rowand. As of 2018, Mike Trout is his only client.

In 2013, Landis expressed his frustration when the Angels renewed Trout's contract for just $510,000 in the wake of his AL Rookie of the Year and MVP runner-up season. Landis said: "Because Mike has less than three years of major league service and has not yet reached arbitration, the Angels have the right under the [collective bargaining agreement] to unilaterally impose a salary upon Mike, and they chose to do that today...I asked only that the Angels compensate Mike fairly for his historic 2012 season, given his service time. In my opinion, this contract falls well short of a 'fair' contract, and I have voiced this to the Angels throughout the process."

Prior to the 2014 season, Landis negotiated a six-year, $144.5 million contract for Trout with the Angels. The deal angered some around baseball who felt that Trout could have signed for more money and worried his contract would suppress the market for players in the future. Landis said, "What Mike was trying to accomplish was some financial security, but also keeping the door open for whatever may happen down the road."

== Personal life ==
Landis is the son of Jim Landis, a former All-Star with the Chicago White Sox and a five-time Gold Glove winner.
