= 1977 Minnesota Golden Gophers baseball team =

American college baseball season

1977 Minnesota Golden Gophers baseball

Big Ten Conference

1977 College World Series, T-6th
- Conference: Big Ten Conference

Ranking
- Coaches: No. 6
- CB: No. 6
- Record: 39–12 (15–3 Big Ten)
- Head coach: Dick Siebert (30th season)
- Captain: Paul Molitor
- Home stadium: Bierman Field

1977 Big Ten Conference baseball standings
	Conf.				Overall
Team	W		L	PCT	W		L	PCT
No. 6 Minnesota ‍†‍‍^{y}	15	–	3	.833	39	–	12	.765
No. 19 Michigan ‍‍‍^{y}	14	–	4	.778	33	–	15	.688
Ohio State ‍‍‍	11	–	5	.688	25	–	24	.510
Iowa ‍‍‍	10	–	8	.556	40	–	14	.741
Michigan State ‍‍‍	10	–	8	.556	28	–	26	.519
Illinois ‍‍‍	8	–	10	.444	23	–	25	.479
Northwestern ‍‍‍	7	–	9	.438	27	–	16	.628
Wisconsin ‍‍‍	7	–	11	.389	22	–	27	.449
Indiana ‍‍‍	4	–	14	.222	21	–	26	.447
Purdue ‍‍‍	2	–	16	.111	14	–	27	.341
† – Conference champion y – Invited to the NCAA tournament As of June 30, 1977; Rankings from Collegiate Baseball

The 1977 Minnesota Golden Gophers baseball team represented the University of Minnesota in the 1977 NCAA Division I baseball season. The head coach was Dick Siebert, serving his 30th year.

The Golden Gophers lost the College World Series, defeated by the Arizona State Sun Devils.

== Roster ==
1977 Minnesota Golden Gophers baseball team
Players
Coaches

#	Pos.	Name	B/T	Height	Weight	Year	Home town
	LHP	Mike Bailey	/	—	—
	LHP	Brad Barclay	/	—	—
	LHP	Perry Bauer	/	—	—	Jr
	LHP	Bob Blake	/	—	—	Jr
	INF	Tarry Boelter	/	—	—
	INF	Mike Bruss	/	—	—
	INF	Jerry Chapman	/	—	—
	RHP	Brian Denman	R/R	6 ft 4 in (1.93 m)	205 lb (93 kg)	Jr	Richfield, Minnesota
	C	George Dierberger	/	—	—
	RHP	Doug Gronseth	/	—	—
	C	Tom Jagiela	/	—	—	Jr
	OF	Jeff Kendall	/	—	—
	C	Joe Lentsch	/	—	—
	OF	Tim Loberg	R/R	6 ft 2 in (1.88 m)	175 lb (79 kg)	Sr	Robbinsdale, Minnesota
	INF	Ken Mauer	/	—	—	Sr	St. Paul, Minnesota
	INF	Dan McEachran	/	—	—
	OF	Tom Mee	L/R	5 ft 11 in (1.8 m)	175 lb (79 kg)	Sr	Prior Lake, Minnesota
	INF	Paul Molitor (C)	R/R	6 ft 0 in (1.83 m)	185 lb (84 kg)	Jr	St. Paul, Minnesota
	RHP	Dan Morgan	R/R	6 ft 4 in (1.93 m)	175 lb (79 kg)	Jr	Superior, Wisconsin
	OF	Jeff Neutzling	/	—	—	Sr	Albany, Minnesota
	RHP	Scott Rosenthal	/	—	—
	OF	Jerry Shimek	/	—	—
	OF	Dan Sieling	/	—	—
	RHP	Jerry Ujdur	R/R	6 ft 1 in (1.85 m)	195 lb (88 kg)	So	Hermantown, Minnesota
	RHP	Chuck Viskocil	/	—	—	Sr

Head coach

Dick Siebert

Assistant coach(es)

Legend

- (C) Team captain
- (S) Suspended
- (I) Ineligible
- Injured
- Current redshirt

== Schedule ==
1977 Minnesota Golden Gophers baseball game log
Regular season
March (2–6)

#	Date	Opponent	Site/stadium	Score	Overall record	Big Ten record
1	March 20	at Texas Lutheran	Unknown • Seguin, Texas	3–1	1–0	0–0
2	March 20	at Texas Lutheran	Unknown • Seguin, Texas, Texas	4–5	1–1	0–0
3	March 21	vs Tulsa	Disch-Falk Field • Austin, Texas	5–4	2–1	0–0
4	March 21	at Texas	Disch-Falk Field • Austin, Texas	2–3	2–2	0–0
5	March 22	at Texas	Disch-Falk Field • Austin, Texas	2–3	2–3	0–0
6	March 22	at Texas	Disch-Falk Field • Austin, Texas	2–5	2–4	0–0
7	March 24	at Texas A&M	Travis Field • College Station, Texas	1–8	2–5	0–0
8	March 24	at Texas A&M	Travis Field • College Station, Texas	5–9	2–6	0–0

April (18–3)

#	Date	Opponent	Site/stadium	Score	Overall record	Big Ten record
9	April 9	at Iowa State	Cap Timm Field • Ames, Iowa	6–7	2–7	0–0
10	April 9	at Iowa State	Cap Timm Field • Ames, Iowa	4–0	3–7	0–0
11	April 10	at Iowa State	Cap Timm Field • Ames, Iowa	2–0	4–7	0–0
12	April 10	at Iowa State	Cap Timm Field • Ames, Iowa	4–2	5–7	0–0
13	April 12	St. Cloud State	Bierman Field • Minneapolis, Minnesota	4–1	6–7	0–0
14	April 12	St. Cloud State	Bierman Field • Minneapolis, Minnesota	19–4	7–7	0–0
15	April 13	Augsburg	Bierman Field • Minneapolis, Minnesota	2–1	8–7	0–0
16	April 13	St. Thomas (MN)	Bierman Field • Minneapolis, Minnesota	2–1	9–7	0–0
17	April 16	at Michigan	Ray Fisher Stadium • Ann Arbor, Michigan	8–0	10–7	1–0
18	April 16	at Michigan	Ray Fisher Stadium • Ann Arbor, Michigan	2–3	10–8	1–1
19	April 17	at Michigan State	John H. Kobs Field • East Lansing, Michigan	5–4	11–8	2–1
20	April 17	at Michigan State	John H. Kobs Field • East Lansing, Michigan	6–2	12–8	3–1
21	April 19	Minnesota Morris	Bierman Field • Minneapolis, Minnesota	8–1	13–8	3–1
22	April 23	Purdue	Bierman Field • Minneapolis, Minnesota	7–3	14–8	4–1
23	April 23	Purdue	Bierman Field • Minneapolis, Minnesota	13–1	15–8	5–1
24	April 24	Illinois	Bierman Field • Minneapolis, Minnesota	15–7	16–8	6–1
25	April 24	Illinois	Bierman Field • Minneapolis, Minnesota	8–2	17–8	7–1
26	April 26	Wisconsin–Oshkosh	Bierman Field • Minneapolis, Minnesota	5–3	18–8	7–1
27	April 26	Wisconsin–Oshkosh	Bierman Field • Minneapolis, Minnesota	12–2	19–8	7–1
28	April 30	at Northwestern	Wells Field • Evanston, Illinois	3–6	19–9	7–2
29	April 30	at Northwestern	Wells Field • Evanston, Illinois	6–1	20–9	8–2

May (15–1)

#	Date	Opponent	Site/stadium	Score	Overall record	Big Ten record
30	May 1	at Wisconsin	Guy Lowman Field • Madison, Wisconsin	6–3	21–9	9–2
31	May 1	at Wisconsin	Guy Lowman Field • Madison, Wisconsin	12–0	22–9	10–2
32	May 3	vs Winona State	Bierman Field • Minneapolis, Minnesota	4–3	23–9	10–2
33	May 3	vs Winona State	Bierman Field • Minneapolis, Minnesota	13–0	24–9	10–2
34	May 7	Wisconsin–Stevens Point	Bierman Field • Minneapolis, Minnesota	2–1	25–9	10–2
35	May 7	Wisconsin–Stevens Point	Bierman Field • Minneapolis, Minnesota	8–7	26–9	10–2
36	May 8	Wisconsin–La Crosse	Bierman Field • Minneapolis, Minnesota	13–0	27–9	10–2
37	May 8	Wisconsin–La Crosse	Bierman Field • Minneapolis, Minnesota	7–2	28–9	10–2
38	May 11	St. Olaf	Bierman Field • Minneapolis, Minnesota	9–1	29–9	10–2
39	May 11	St. Olaf	Bierman Field • Minneapolis, Minnesota	8–3	30–9	10–2
40	May 14	Indiana	Bierman Field • Minneapolis, Minnesota	4–2	31–9	11–2
41	May 14	Indiana	Bierman Field • Minneapolis, Minnesota	6–0	32–9	12–2
42	May 15	Ohio State	Bierman Field • Minneapolis, Minnesota	3–0	33–9	13–2
43	May 15	Ohio State	Bierman Field • Minneapolis, Minnesota	3–2	34–9	14–2
44	May 21	at Iowa	Iowa Field • Iowa City, Iowa	2–6	34–10	14–3
45	May 21	at Iowa	Iowa Field • Iowa City, Iowa	10–1	35–10	15–3

Postseason
Mideast Regional (3–0)

#	Date	Opponent	Site/stadium	Score	Overall record	Big Ten record
46	May 26	Florida	Bierman Field • Minneapolis, Minnesota	7–0	36–10	15–3
47	May 27	Central Michigan	Bierman Field • Minneapolis, Minnesota	13–2	37–10	15–3
48	May 29	Florida	Bierman Field • Minneapolis, Minnesota	5–1	38–10	15–3

1977 College World Series (1–2)

#	Date	Opponent	Site/stadium	Score	Overall record	Big Ten record
49	June 11	vs Cal State Los Angeles	Johnny Rosenblatt Stadium • Omaha, Nebraska	4–7	38–11	15–3
50	June 12	vs Baylor	Johnny Rosenblatt Stadium • Omaha, Nebraska	4–3	39–11	15–3
51	June 14	vs Arizona State	Johnny Rosenblatt Stadium • Omaha, Nebraska	4–8	39–12	15–3

== Awards and honors ==
Brian Denman

- First Team All-Big Ten

Jeff Neutzling

- First Team All-Big Ten
