= Hubie Brooks =

American baseball player (born 1956)

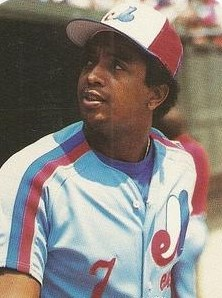
- Right fielder / Third baseman / Shortstop
- Born: September 24, 1956 (age 70); Los Angeles, California, U.S.
- Batted: Right Threw: Right

MLB debut
- September 4, 1980, for the New York Mets

Last MLB appearance
- July 2, 1994, for the Kansas City Royals

MLB statistics
- Batting average: .269
- Home runs: 149
- Runs batted in: 824
- Stats at Baseball Reference

Teams
- New York Mets (1980–1984); Montreal Expos (1985–1989); Los Angeles Dodgers (1990); New York Mets (1991); California Angels (1992); Kansas City Royals (1993–1994)

Career highlights and awards
- 2× All-Star (1986, 1987); 2× Silver Slugger Award (1985, 1986)

Hubert Brooks (born September 24, 1956) is an American former professional baseball right fielder, third baseman, and shortstop. He played 15 seasons in Major League Baseball (MLB) from 1980 to 1994 for the New York Mets, Montreal Expos, Los Angeles Dodgers, California Angels, and Kansas City Royals. Brooks was selected third overall in the 1978 Major League Baseball draft by the New York Mets and went on to play for five different teams over a 15-year career, and was twice named an All-Star. MLB pitcher Donnie Moore was Brooks' cousin.

== Early years ==
Brooks was drafted by the Montreal Expos as a senior at Manuel Dominguez High School in the 1974 Major League Baseball draft but chose instead to attend Mesa Community College (Arizona) and continue on to Whittier College where he stayed from 1975 through 1976 before transferring to Arizona State University. With the Arizona State Sun Devils, Brooks appeared in two NCAA College World Series, winning in 1977. The ASU shortstop was drafted fifth overall in the January 1976 secondary draft by the Kansas City Royals, fourteenth overall in the June 1976 secondary draft by the Chicago White Sox, second overall in the January 1977 secondary draft by the Oakland Athletics, and again by the White Sox third overall in the June 1977 secondary draft; however, he did not sign with any team. After he played out his college career, he was drafted by the Mets third overall in the 1978 amateur draft, two selections behind ASU teammate Bob Horner.

Unlike Horner, who was assigned to the Atlanta Braves' major league roster upon signing, Brooks was assigned to the double A Jackson Mets, where he batted .216 with 3 home runs and 16 RBIs in 45 games. The following season, with fellow Mets prospect Wally Backman playing short for Jackson, Brooks was converted to a third baseman. He also played some outfield with the triple A Tidewater Tides in 1980.

== New York Mets ==
Brooks debuted as a September call-up in 1980. In 24 games, Brooks batted .309 with 1 home run and 10 runs batted in. He won the starting job at third out of Spring training 1981 and quickly became a fan favorite, batting over .300 for most of the strike shortened season. He finished the season at .307 with four home runs and 38 RBIs to finish third in National League Rookie of the Year voting behind Fernando Valenzuela and Tim Raines.

Given the Mets' longstanding challenges in maintaining a consistent third baseman, Brooks remained popular in New York City despite being a below-average fielder and as power hitter. (He tied a modern major league record by committing three errors in one inning his rookie season.)

He set a Mets record with a 24-game hitting streak from May 1 to June 1, 1984; during this period, he batted .398 in 83 at-bats. (The record has since been tied by Mike Piazza in 1999 and broken by David Wright with 26 and Moisés Alou with 30 in 2007.) He was having his best season statistically—having already set career highs in home runs (13) and RBIs (61)—when the Mets acquired third baseman Ray Knight from the Houston Astros on August 28. Brooks was subsequently shifted to short for the rest of the season by Mets manager Davey Johnson.

== Montreal Expos ==
Montreal Expos shortstops batted .212 with no home runs and 35 RBIs in 1984. Thus, the team went into the offseason looking to upgrade at that position. On December 10, 1984, the Expos and Mets pulled off the blockbuster deal of the Winter Meetings when the Mets sent Brooks, pitcher Floyd Youmans, catcher Mike Fitzgerald, and outfielder Herm Winningham to the Expos for perennial All-Star catcher Gary Carter.

Plugged into the clean-up spot in Montreal's batting order, Brooks blossomed into a Silver Slugger Award–winning shortstop in 1985. He drove in a career-high 100 runs, which led the team and was second only to Cal Ripken Jr. among major league shortstops (110). Brooks was batting .333 with 14 home runs and 54 RBIs at the 1986 All-Star break to earn his first All-Star selection. Five games after the break, however, he tore ligaments in his left thumb, ending his season. He was named the NL's Silver Slugger at short for a second season in a row regardless of his time missed.

Three games into the 1987 season, Brooks was again sidelined by injury, this time by a hairline fracture of his right wrist. When he returned to the field, he resumed his role as the top slugging shortstop in the National League. Despite having missed more than a month of play with his wrist injury, Brooks clubbed 7 home runs and drove in 30 runs to earn his second consecutive All-Star nod. The game went into extra innings and was won by the National League when Brooks and Ozzie Virgil Jr. scored on Tim Raines' triple in the thirteenth inning.

Following an injury to minor league outfield prospect Larry Walker playing winter ball, the Expos shifted Brooks to right field for the 1988 season. Despite his disappointment with the situation, Brooks responded with one of his best offensive seasons, batting .279 with 90 RBIs and a career-high 20 home runs. He spent one more season in right field for the Expos before departing via free agency.

== Los Angeles Dodgers ==
The Atlanta Braves expressed interest in signing Brooks and returning him to third base for the 1990 season. However, Brooks ultimately opted to sign with his home team Los Angeles Dodgers and remain in right field. His contract contained a clause that prevented him from being traded back to the Expos or to any American League team except the California Angels.

Brooks batted .266 with 20 home runs and 91 RBIs in his only season with the Dodgers, after which he was traded back to the New York Mets for pitchers Greg Hansell and Bob Ojeda.

== New York Mets (second stint) ==
Brooks was unhappy about this trade, and it resulted in a poor performance on the field. He batted .238 with 16 home runs and 50 RBIs through 103 games when his 1991 season was cut short by a pinched nerve in his back.

== California Angels ==
On December 10, 1991, the Mets traded him to the California Angels for outfielder Dave Gallagher, reuniting him with his former Expos manager, Buck Rodgers. Brooks was used as the designated hitter by Rodgers, and batted .213 with 7 home runs and 30 RBIs until a sprained neck sidelined his 1992 season. He returned in the beginning of September, with John Wathan replacing Rodgers as manager, but hit just one home run and drove in just six in limited play over the rest of the season.

== Kansas City Royals ==
The Kansas City Royals signed Brooks to a minor league deal with an invitation to spring training for the 1993 season. He made the club as its right-handed bat off the bench and batted .303 as a pinch hitter. He remained in that role through the midpoint of the 1994 season when he was released to make room for a re-activated Wally Joyner, who was returning from the disabled list.

== Career stats ==
Games	PA	AB	Runs	Hits	2B	3B	HR	RBI	SB	BB	SO	Avg.	OBP	Slg.	Fld%
1645	6476	5974	656	1608	290	31	149	824	64	387	1005	.269	.315	.403	.953

At the time of his dismissal, Brooks was the active major league leader in games played without making it to the post season (1,645). After the end of his career, Brooks received no votes from the Baseball Writers' Association of America for the Baseball Hall of Fame and was subsequently removed from the ballot. He collected career-highs in home runs (20) in 1988 and 1990. He collected his career-high RBI total (100) in 1985, and he finished 8th in batting average (.307) in 1981.
