= Dave Hudgens =

American baseball player & coach (born 1956)

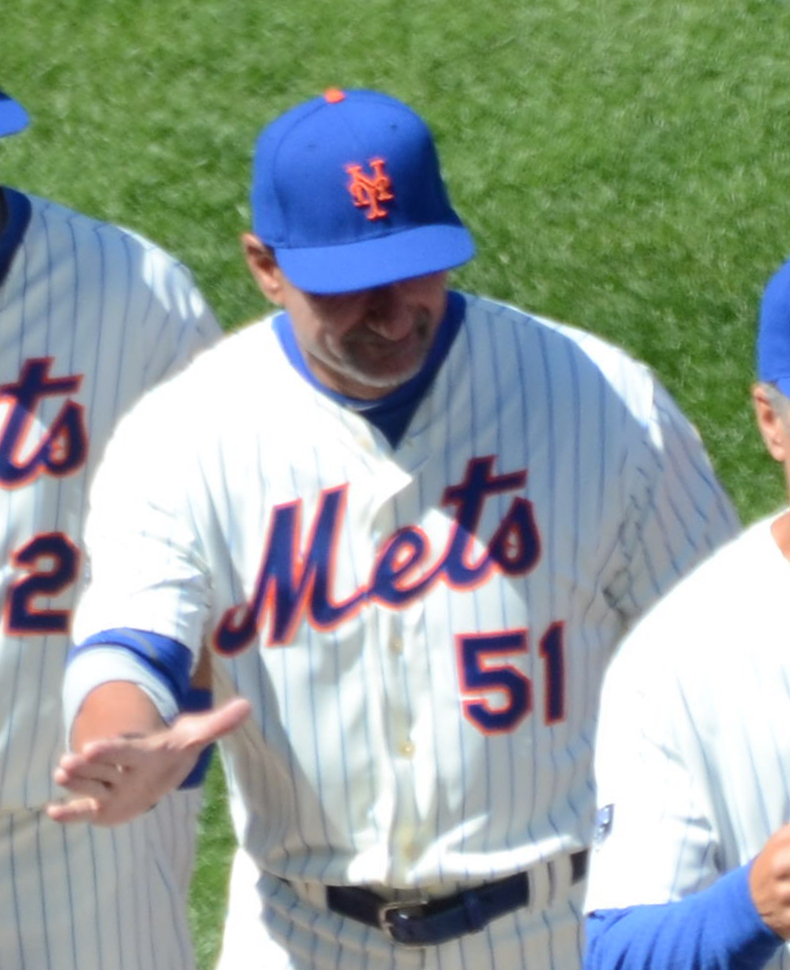
- Hudgens as coach for the New York Mets in 2012.

Toronto Blue Jays
- First baseman
- Born: December 5, 1956 (age 69); Oroville, California, U.S.
- Batted: Left Threw: Left

MLB debut
- September 4, 1983, for the Oakland Athletics

Last MLB appearance
- October 1, 1983, for the Oakland Athletics

MLB statistics
- Batting average: .143
- Home runs: 0
- Runs batted in: 0
- Stats at Baseball Reference

Teams
- As player: Oakland Athletics (1983); As coach: Oakland Athletics (1999, 2003–2005); New York Mets (2011–2014); Houston Astros (2015–2018); Toronto Blue Jays (2019–2023)

Career highlights and awards
- World Series champion (2017)

David Mark Hudgens (born December 5, 1956) is an American former professional baseball first baseman. As of the 2024 season, Hudgens works within the Toronto Blue Jays minor league organization as a coach.

== Playing career ==
Hudgens was selected by the New York Mets in the first round of the 1975 MLB draft, and later by the Milwaukee Brewers in the 18th round of the 1977 MLB draft. He did not sign either time, and instead chose to attend Arizona State University. He appeared in two College World Series during his four years with the Sun Devils. In his college career, he posted a .313 batting average with 16 home runs and 135 runs batted in. After graduating, Hudgens played for the Oakland Athletics and Cleveland Indians in their minor league systems in a span of six seasons from 1979–1984, while appearing in six games with the Athletics in 1983.

== Coaching career ==
After retiring from playing baseball, Hudgens managed four years in Oakland's minor league system from 1985-1988 for the Medford A's and Pocatello A's. He was hired by Oakland A's General Manager Billy Beane. He also managed winter ball for the Leones del Caracas club of the Venezuelan Professional Baseball League, posting a record of 35-28 during the winter of 2009. He then returned to manage the Leones in 2014, but was dismissed in the middle of the season.

In between, Hudgens served as hitting coach for the New York Mets from 2011 to 2014. He was released in May 2014 following a Mets' loss to the Pittsburgh Pirates.

Before the 2015 season, Hudgens was hired by the Houston Astros to be their hitting coach under new manager A. J. Hinch. In 2017, the Astros won the World Series. Three years later, it was revealed in the Houston Astros sign stealing scandal that the team had cheated during its championship season. Hudgens subsequently apologized for his role in the scandal.

On November 7, 2018, Hudgens was hired by the Toronto Blue Jays to become their bench coach under new manager Charlie Montoyo. On March 13, 2022, the Blue Jays announced that Hudgens would serve in a new role as the club's hitting strategist.

Hudgens was reassigned within the Blue Jays organization in November 2023.
