= 1977 Major League Baseball draft =

Baseball draft of amateur players

Overview
- First selection: Harold Baines; Chicago White Sox
- First round selections: 26
- Hall of Famers: 4: OF Harold Baines; SS Paul Molitor; SS Ozzie Smith; OF Tim Raines

The 1977 Major League Baseball draft took place prior to the 1977 MLB season. The draft saw the Chicago White Sox select Harold Baines first overall.

== First round selections ==
| = All-Star | = Baseball Hall of Famer |

The following are the first round picks in the 1977 Major League Baseball draft.

| Pick | Player | Team | Position | Hometown/School |
|---|---|---|---|---|
| 1 | Harold Baines | Chicago White Sox | OF | St. Michaels, Maryland |
| 2 | Bill Gullickson | Montreal Expos | RHP | Orland Park, Illinois |
| 3 | Paul Molitor | Milwaukee Brewers | SS | Minnesota |
| 4 | Tim Cole | Atlanta Braves | LHP | Saugerties, New York |
| 5 | Kevin Richards | Detroit Tigers | RHP | Wyandotte, Michigan |
| 6 | Terry Kennedy | St. Louis Cardinals | C | Florida State University |
| 7 | Richard Dotson | California Angels | RHP | Cincinnati, Ohio |
| 8 | Brian Greer | San Diego Padres | OF | Brea, California |
| 9 | David Hibner | Texas Rangers | SS | Howell, Michigan |
| 10 | Craig Landis | San Francisco Giants | SS | Napa, California |
| 11 | Bruce Compton | Cleveland Indians | OF | Norman, Oklahoma |
| 12 | Randy Martz | Chicago Cubs | RHP | South Carolina |
| 13 | Andrew Madden | Boston Red Sox | RHP | New Hartford, New York |
| 14 | Ricky Adams | Houston Astros | SS | Montclair, California |
| 15 | Paul Croft | Minnesota Twins | OF | Morristown, New Jersey |
| 16 | Wally Backman | New York Mets | SS | Beaverton, Oregon |
| 17 | Craig Harris | Oakland Athletics | RHP | Sierra Vista, Arizona |
| 18 | Anthony Nicely | Pittsburgh Pirates | OF | Dayton, Ohio |
| 19 | Drungo Hazewood | Baltimore Orioles | OF | Sacramento, California |
| 20 | Bob Welch | Los Angeles Dodgers | RHP | Eastern Michigan |
| 21 | Mike Jones | Kansas City Royals | LHP | Pittsford, New York |
| 22 | Scott Munninghoff | Philadelphia Phillies | RHP | Cincinnati, Ohio |
| 23 | Steve Taylor | New York Yankees | RHP | Delaware |
| 24 | Tad Venger | Cincinnati Reds | 3B | Newhall, California |
| 25 | Tom Goffena | Toronto Blue Jays | SS | Sidney, Ohio |
| 26 | Dave Henderson | Seattle Mariners | OF | Dos Palos, California |

== Other notable selections ==
| = All-Star | = Baseball Hall of Famer |

| Round | Pick | Player | Team | Position |
|---|---|---|---|---|
| 2 | 29 | Kevin Bass | Milwaukee Brewers | OF |
| 2 | 38 | Terry Francona* | Chicago Cubs | 1B |
| 2 | 42 | Mookie Wilson | New York Mets | OF |
| 3 | 54 | Scott Sanderson | Montreal Expos | RHP |
| 3 | 57 | Darrell Brown | Detroit Tigers | OF |
| 4 | 84 | Jim Gott | St. Louis Cardinals | RHP |
| 4 | 85 | Brian Harper | California Angels | C |
| 4 | 86 | Ozzie Smith | San Diego Padres | SS |
| 5 | 106 | Tim Raines | Montreal Expos | OF |
| 5 | 124 | Mickey Hatcher | Los Angeles Dodgers | OF |
| 7 | 145 | Jesse Orosco* | St. Louis Cardinals | LHP |
| 9 | 233 | Jesse Barfield | Toronto Blue Jays | OF |
| 11 | 270 | Chili Davis | San Francisco Giants | OF |
| 15 | 389 | Danny Ainge | Toronto Blue Jays | INF |
| 16 | 416 | Tony Phillips* | Seattle Mariners | INF/OF |
| 17 | 429 | Gary Redus* | Boston Red Sox | OF |
| 36 | 762 | Tom Niedenfuer | Los Angeles Dodgers | RHP |

* Did not sign

== Background ==
The White Sox surprised some when they passed on right-handed pitcher Bill Gullickson, a native of nearby Orland Park, Illinois, and selected outfielder Harold Baines as the number one pick in the draft. White Sox owner Bill Veeck had seen Baines play little league baseball in Maryland and had followed his progress through the years. After spending three seasons in the minors, Baines was a fixture in the White Sox lineup for 10 seasons, and was eventually elected to the baseball Hall of Fame.

With Gullickson available, Montreal selected the pitcher second overall, and eventually pitcher Scott Sanderson in the third round and outfielder Tim Raines in the fifth.

Shortstop Tom Goffena from Sidney, Ohio became the Toronto Blue Jays' first draft pick as he was chosen 25th in the first round. The Seattle Mariners picked 26th and took outfielder Dave Henderson from Dos Palos, California as their first draft pick. The Blue Jays also picked Danny Ainge out of Brigham Young University in the 15th round. Ainge, who was also drafted by the NBA's Boston Celtics, later quit baseball and played basketball instead, becoming a basketball coach and executive after his playing days ended.

| Preceded by Floyd Bannister | 1st Overall Picks; Harold Baines | Succeeded by Bob Horner |
