= Jim Brock =

American baseball coach (1936–1994)

Biographical details
- Born: July 24, 1936; Phoenix, Arizona, U.S.
- Died: June 12, 1994 (aged 57); Mesa, Arizona, U.S.
- Education: Arizona State University

Coaching career (HC unless noted)
- 1972–1994: Arizona State

Head coaching record
- Overall: 1,099–441-1

Accomplishments and honors

Championships
- 2 College World Series (1977, 1981)

Awards
- National Coach of the Year (1977, 1981, 1984, 1988)
- College Baseball Hall of Fame; Inducted in 2007

Jim Brock (July 24, 1936 – June 12, 1994) was the head coach of the Arizona State Sun Devils baseball team for 23 seasons from 1972 until his death in 1994.

During his first year as head coach, Brock managed his team to a 64–6 record. That mark remains the NCAA record for all-time winning percentage in a single season (.914). Brock's record at ASU was 1,100–440 (.714), and he also led ASU to thirteen College World Series appearances.

In 1994, Brock battled liver and colon cancer that would take his life one day after the conclusion of the College World Series. Though his strength was waning, Brock did not miss a conference game through the '94 season. He led his team through the regional tournament at Knoxville, Tennessee, and was in the dugout when the Sun Devils beat the University of Miami 4–0, in the opener of the College World Series. Speaking in little more than a whisper, he gave his team an inspirational pep talk after a scoreless first inning when he sensed that the Sun Devils were flat. "You can make an assumption that you'll be up because it's the College World Series," Brock said, "But you spend so much emotion in the final game of the regional that you sometimes have to find a way to regain that emotion." On his way to Rosenblatt Stadium (home of the College World Series), for the second game of the Series, Brock's condition worsened. The Sun Devils went on to lose to the University of Oklahoma, 4–3, in the home half of the eleventh inning. Brock was airlifted from Omaha to a Mesa hospital shortly before game number three. His Sun Devils went on to hit five home runs to eliminate top-seeded Miami, 9–5, presenting him with his 1,100th coaching victory. Later, Oklahoma eliminated ASU from the series and went on to capture the national title. On June 12, 1994, three days after his team's season ended, Brock died of colon cancer. He was 57. Brock was posthumously voted into the College Baseball Hall of Fame in 2007.

Brock coached ASU to two College World Series Championships in 1977 and 1981, and was named National Coach of the Year four different times in his career (1977, 1981, 1984, 1988). Brock sent 175 players into professional baseball—an average of almost eight per year. Brock coached seven first-round picks and all of ASU's three Golden Spikes winners. He was a five-time winner of the Pacific-10 Conference (Pac-10) Coach of the Year. Brock's No. 33 is retired by ASU, and in 2006, Bobby Winkles Field-Packard Stadium at Brock Ballpark was dedicated to Brock.
