= Arizona State Sun Devils baseball =

Collegiate sports program

- 2027 Arizona State Sun Devils baseball team
- Founded: 1959; 67 years ago
- University: Arizona State University
- Head coach: Willie Bloomquist (5th season)
- Conference: Big 12
- Location: Tempe, Arizona
- Home stadium: Phoenix Municipal Stadium (capacity: 8,775)
- Nickname: Sun Devils
- Colors: Maroon and gold

College World Series champions
- 1965, 1967, 1969, 1977, 1981

College World Series runner-up
- 1972, 1973, 1978, 1988, 1998

College World Series appearances
- 1964, 1965, 1967, 1969, 1972, 1973, 1975, 1976, 1977, 1978, 1981, 1983, 1984, 1987, 1988, 1993, 1994, 1998, 2005, 2007*, 2009, 2010 *vacated by NCAA (Note: On December 15, 2010, the NCAA announced sanctions that forced Arizona State to vacate 44 wins from its 2007 season after a number of recruitment violations.)

NCAA regional champions
- 1975, 1976, 1977, 1978, 1981, 1983, 1984, 1987, 1988, 1993, 1994, 1998, 2003, 2005, 2007*, 2008, 2009, 2010, 2011 * vacated by NCAA

NCAA tournament appearances
- 1964, 1965, 1967, 1969, 1972, 1973, 1975, 1976, 1977, 1978, 1981, 1982, 1983, 1984, 1987, 1988, 1989, 1990, 1992, 1993, 1994, 1997, 1998, 2000, 2001, 2002, 2003, 2004, 2005, 2006, 2007*, 2008, 2009, 2010, 2011, 2013, 2014, 2015, 2016, 2019, 2021, 2025, 2026 *vacated by NCAA

Conference regular season champions
- 1964, 1965, 1967, 1969, 1971, 1972, 1973, 1975, 1976, 1977, 1978, 1981, 1982, 1984, 1988, 1993, 2000, 2007*, 2008, 2009, 2010 *vacated by NCAA

The Arizona State Sun Devils baseball program at the Arizona State University (ASU) is part of the Big 12 Conference. Since it became a member of the Pac-12, it had the highest winning percentage, at .681, of all schools that participate in Division I baseball within the conference. ASU's NCAA leading 54 consecutive 30 win seasons was the longest streak in the nation. The Sun Devils have had just four losing seasons in program history (1963, 2017, 2018, and 2022). The Sun Devils had been nationally ranked during at least a part of every season of their 58-year history until 2017. The Sun Devils have finished 27 times in the Top 10, 22 times in the Top 5, and 5 times as the No. 1 team in the nation.

ASU is one of the most successful college baseball programs in the country. The Sun Devils have won five national championships, the fourth-most by any school, and are 1st in total number of alumni to ever play in Major League Baseball. Notable Sun Devil baseball alumni include Barry Bonds, Reggie Jackson, Sal Bando, Dustin Pedroia, Andre Ethier, Bob Horner, Paul Lo Duca, and Rick Monday.

== History ==
=== The Bobby Winkles years (1959–1971) ===
Arizona State University adopted baseball as a varsity sport in 1959. Under the guidance of coach Bobby Winkles, the Sun Devils finished their first season with a 28–18–1 record. In 1964, Coach Winkles led the team to a 44–7 record, winning the Western Athletic Conference title. They beat Utah twice in the WAC playoffs and then beat Air Force 6–1 and 7–6 to win District 7 and advanced to the 1964 College World Series. In their first game the Sun Devils were shut out 7–0 by the Missouri Tigers. The next day they beat Mississippi 5–0 before losing their next game two days later 4–2 to Maine. The following year the Sun Devils went 9–3 in the WAC to win back-to-back conference championships. In 1965, Rick Monday was taken first overall in the inaugural Major League First-Year Player Draft.

Their first game in the 1965 College World Series was a blowout win against Lafayette. The offense again exploded against St. Louis 13–3. They beat Ohio State 9–4, then beat St. Louis again 6–2 where they faced Ohio State. Arizona State lost the first game 7–3 but won the next game 2–1 to win their first national championship. The following season the defending national champions were unable to defend their title as they finished the season 41–11, finishing second in the conference, and failed to make the postseason.

In 1967 the Sun Devils were able to get back to the College World Series as they went 53–12 and made an appearance in the WAC championship losing the first game to BYU 3–0, before coming back to win the next two 6–3 and 4–3 to win the WAC championship. In the District 7 playoff series, they split the first two games of the series, winning 11–0 then losing 5–2. They were able to win the final game of the series 6–0 advancing to the 1967 College World Series. They opened winning two blowout games 7–2 and 8–1 against Oklahoma State and Boston College before winning a close one against Stanford 5–3. They were shut out in the next game against the Houston Cougars 3–0 before coming back to beat Stanford 4–3 and avenging the loss against Houston to win a blowout 11–2 to win their second national championship.

Once again, the Sun Devils followed up their national championship season with a second place conference finish and failed to receive a postseason berth. In 1969 the Devils were able to return to the World Series winning the WAC championship against BYU, then swept Idaho 7–1 and 3–2 in the District 7 playoff. They dropped their first game of the 1969 College World Series 4–0 to Texas, however they would win their next five games to win their third national championship in five years, winning the championship game 10–1 against Tulsa. This was the program's third national championship in the last five years.

After the 1971 season, Coach Winkles was hired by the California Angels. Bobby Winkles was ASU's first varsity baseball coach and maintained an impressive 524–173 record during his 13 years of coaching for the Sun Devils. A three-time NCAA Coach of the Year, Winkles took the ASU program from scratch and built it into one of the premier powerhouses in all of college baseball.

=== The Packard Stadium years ===
Winkles Field-Packard Stadium at Brock Ballpark, located in Tempe, was the home of Arizona State baseball from 1974 to 2014. Dimensions of Packard are 338 feet (103 m) down the lines, 368 feet (112 m) in the power alleys and 395 to straightaway center. The fence is 10 feet (3.0 m) high. Located five feet beyond the center-field wall is the "Green Monster," a 30-foot-high batting eye. The outfield wall is lined with orange trees and just beyond the left field fence lies the Salt River which winds its way through the Valley of the Sun.

The facility is the home of two national championship teams and 17 NCAA regional tournaments. Arizona State's all-time record at Packard is 1,035–272–1*, for a winning percentage of .792. In 2010, ASU went 36–3 at home and hosted a Super Regional for the fourth straight season, clinching a berth in the College World Series on their home field for the third time in four seasons. Since 2007, the Sun Devils have an astounding home record of 146–15*.

A 2003 coaches survey published in Baseball America ranked ASU's baseball facilities among the Top 15 in the nation.

The final game played at Packard Stadium was on May 20, 2014, where ASU defeated Abilene Christian 4–2. The Sun Devils opened the 2015 season at Phoenix Municipal Stadium.

== Head coaches ==
| Tenure | Coach | Seasons | Record | Pct. |
|---|---|---|---|---|
| 1959–1971 | Bobby Winkles | 13 | 524–173–1 | .751 |
| 1972–1994 | Jim Brock | 24 | 1,099–441–1 | .713 |
| 1995–2009 | Pat Murphy | 15 | 629–284–1 | .689 |
| 2010–2014 | Tim Esmay | 5 | 201–94–1 | .681 |
| 2015–2021 | Tracy Smith | 7 | 201–155 | .565 |
| 2022–present | Willie Bloomquist | 5 | 165-126 | .567 |
| Total | 6 coaches | 69 | 2819–1272–4 | .689 |

== College Baseball Hall of Fame Members ==
=== Players ===
| Name | Position | Year Inducted |
|---|---|---|
| Barry Bonds | Outfielder | 2026 |
| Hubie Brooks | Shortstop | 2025 |
| Chris Bando | Catcher | 2023 |
| Gary Gentry | Pitcher | 2020 |
| Rick Monday | Outfielder | 2016 |
| Joe Arnold | Pitcher | 2015 |
| Mike Kelly | Outfielder | 2015 |
| Sal Bando | Third Baseman | 2013 |
| Oddibe McDowell | Centerfielder | 2011 |
| Alan Bannister | Shortstop | 2010 |
| Eddie Bane | Pitcher | 2008 |
| Floyd Bannister | Pitcher | 2008 |
| Bob Horner | Infielder | 2006 |

=== Coaches ===
| Name | Coaching Record | Year Inducted |
|---|---|---|
| Jim Brock | 1,099–441-1 | 2007 |
| Bobby Winkles | 524–173 | 2006 |

Ref:

== Baseball Hall of Fame Members ==
| Name | Position | All-Star | # of Seasons | Inducted | Vote % | Career History |
|---|---|---|---|---|---|---|
| Reggie Jackson | Right Fielder | 14 | 21 | 1993 | 93.62 | Oakland A's (1967-1975), Baltimore Orioles (1976), New York Yankees (1977-1981), California Angels (1982-1986), Oakland A's (1987) |

== Former and current players in MLB ==
- Jamie Allen
- Gary Allenson
- Doug Baker
- Chris Bando
- Sal Bando
- Eddie Bane
- Alan Bannister
- Floyd Bannister
- Tony Barnette
- Austin Barnes
- Jake Barrett
- Marty Barrett
- Chris Beasley
- Willie Bloomquist
- Randy Bobb
- Barry Bonds
- Ryan Bradley
- Hubie Brooks
- Travis Buck
- Ryan Burr
- Kole Calhoun
- Mike Colbern
- Brooks Conrad
- Jim Crawford
- Jacob Cruz
- Colin Curtis
- Alvin Davis
- Ike Davis
- Mike Devereaux
- Chris Duffy
- Jeff Duncan
- Duffy Dyer
- Jake Elmore
- Mike Esposito
- Andre Ethier
- Larry Fritz
- Gary Gentry
- Shawn Gilbert
- Tuffy Gosewisch
- Larry Gura
- Eric Helfand
- Doug Henry
- Kevin Higgins
- Donnie Hill
- Bob Horner
- Dave Hudgens
- Darrell Jackson
- Reggie Jackson
- Mitch Jones
- Luke Keaschall
- Merrill Kelly
- Mike Kelly
- Ian Kinsler
- Jason Kipnis
- Lerrin LaGrow
- Ken Landreaux
- Jeff Larish
- Mike Leake
- Jim Lentine
- Jack Lind
- Pat Listach
- John Littlefield
- Paul Lo Duca
- Pete Lovrich
- Sean Lowe
- Jerry Maddox
- Drew Maggi
- Deven Marrero
- Alec Marsh
- Adam McCreery
- Oddibe McDowell
- Cody McKay
- Luis Medina
- Lemmie Miller
- Blas Minor
- Gabe Molina
- Rick Monday
- Paul Moskau
- Ricky Lee Nelson
- Chris Nyman
- Jim Otten
- Bob Pate
- Dustin Pedroia
- Rick Peters
- Ken Phelps
- John Poloni
- Paul Powell
- Gary Rajsich
- Len Randle
- Scott Reid
- Brady Rodgers
- Ron Romanick
- Andrew Romine
- Kevin Romine
- Dennis Sarfate
- Alan Schmelz
- Mike Schwabe
- Brian Serven
- Sterling Slaughter
- Eric Sogard
- Josh Spence
- Tim Spehr
- Todd Steverson
- Mel Stocker
- Craig Swan
- Jon Switzer
- Spencer Torkelson
- Jim Umbarger
- Ed Vande Berg
- Fernando Viña
- Don Wakamatsu
- Brett Wallace
- Alika Williams
- Trevor Williams
- Antone Williamson
- Bump Wills
- Gage Workman

== See also ==
- List of NCAA Division I baseball programs
- 1965 Arizona State Sun Devils baseball team
