= Brian Denman =

American baseball player (born 1956)

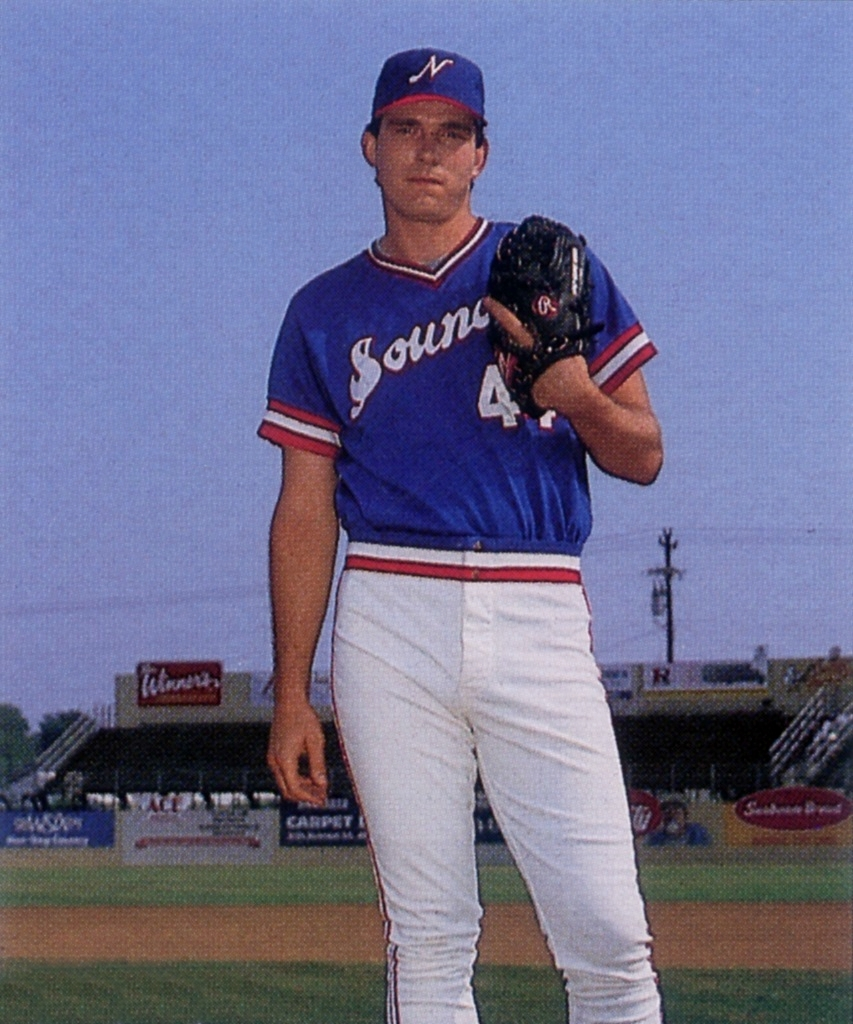
- Denman with the Nashville Sounds in 1986
- Pitcher
- Born: February 12, 1956 (age 70); Minneapolis, Minnesota, U.S.
- Batted: Right Threw: Right

MLB debut
- August 2, 1982, for the Boston Red Sox

Last MLB appearance
- October 2, 1982, for the Boston Red Sox

MLB statistics
- Win–loss record: 3-4
- Earned run average: 4.78
- Strikeouts: 9
- Stats at Baseball Reference

Teams
- Boston Red Sox (1982)

Brian John Denman (born February 12, 1956) is an American former starting pitcher in Major League Baseball who played briefly for the Boston Red Sox during the 1982 season. Listed at 6' 4", 205 lb., Denman batted and threw right-handed.

== Amateur career ==
Denman attended the University of Minnesota. In 1977, First Team All-Big Ten played collegiate summer baseball with the Cotuit Kettleers of the Cape Cod Baseball League, and was the winning pitcher in the league's All-Star Game at Fenway Park. Denman was selected by the Red Sox in the first round of the 1978 MLB draft.

== Professional career ==
Denman was a highly touted prospect in the Red Sox organization. From 1978 through 1982, he went 51–22 with 428 strikeouts and a 2.69 earned run average in 115 starts at three different minor league levels. He joined the big team in August 1982, and posted a 3–4 record with nine strikeouts and a 4.78 ERA in nine starts, including two complete games and a six-hit, 5-0 shutout over Dave Righetti and the New York Yankees at Yankee Stadium (on October 2).

Between the minors and major league action, Denman worked 806 innings. From 1983 to 1984, he divided his playing time between Triple-A Pawtucket and Double-A New Britain, combining for a 15–17 mark with a 5.29 ERA in 45 appearances. Signed by the Detroit Tigers before the 1985 season, he pitched two years of minor league ball for Triple-A Nashville.
