= Chris Nyman =

American baseball player (born 1955)

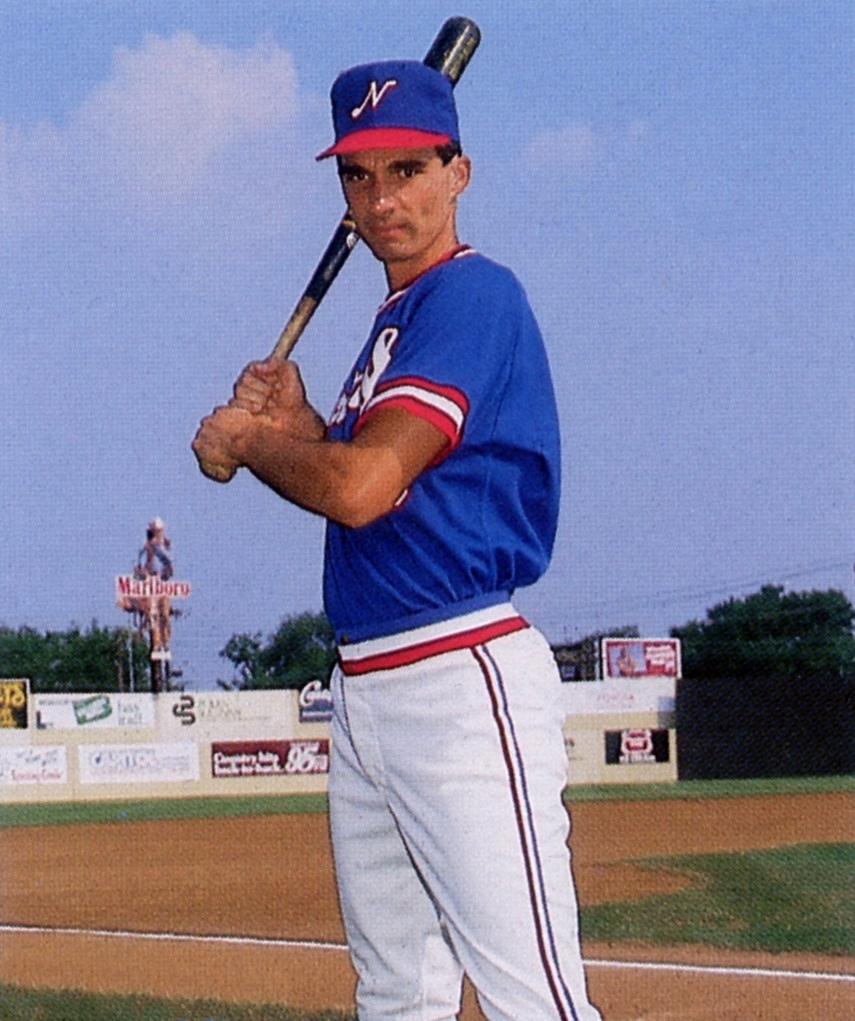
- Nyman with the Nashville Sounds in 1986
- First baseman
- Born: June 6, 1955 (age 70); Pomona, California, U.S.
- Batted: Right Threw: Right

Professional debut
- MLB: July 28, 1982, for the Chicago White Sox
- NPB: March 31, 1984, for the Nankai Hawks

Last appearance
- MLB: October 1, 1983, for the Chicago White Sox
- NPB: October 20, 1985, for the Nankai Hawks

MLB statistics
- Batting average: .258
- Home runs: 2
- Runs batted in: 6

NPB statistics
- Batting average: .276
- Home runs: 55
- Runs batted in: 160
- Stats at Baseball Reference

Teams
- Chicago White Sox (1982–1983); Nankai Hawks (1984–1985)

Christopher Curtis Nyman (born June 6, 1955) is an American former professional baseball first baseman. He played during two seasons at the Major League Baseball (MLB) for the Chicago White Sox. He was signed by the White Sox as an amateur free agent in 1977. Nyman, played his first professional season with their Class A Appleton Foxes in 1978, and split his last season with their Triple-A club, the Buffalo Bisons, and the Detroit Tigers' Triple-A club, the Nashville Sounds, in 1986. In 1984 and 1985, Nyman played in Japan for the Nankai Hawks.

Nyman is the brother of fellow former major leaguer Nyls Nyman.

== Pro career ==
Nyman was drafted by the Chicago White Sox in the 21st round of the 1973 MLB draft out of Cordova High School in Tempe, Arizona. Instead of signing with the White Sox right away, Nyman opted to play college baseball for Arizona State. He made his pro debut for the Appleton Foxes, which was the Single-A team for the White Sox. Nyman made a steady climb up the ladder in the Sox system. Between 1978 and 1980, he split time between Appelton and the Sox Double A team, the Knoxville Sox. In 1980, he finally made it to Triple A, and remained there the next season as well, as the White Sox changed their Triple-A affiliate from the Iowa Oaks to the Edmonton Trappers.

Nyman made his major league debut for Chicago in 1982, where he split time at first base with starter Tom Paciorek and his back-up Mike Squires. Nyman started the 1983 season with the Denver Bears who had replaced the Trappers as the White Sox new Triple A affiliate. Nyman would spend part of the 1983 season with Chicago as well. He played his final game on the major league level on October 1, 1983, against the Seattle Mariners as a pinch runner for designated hitter Greg Luzinski. Nyman would end up scoring a run in the White Sox 9–3 win over Seattle.

Nyman did not re-sign with Chicago, instead opting to go overseas. He spent the 1984 and 1985 seasons with the Nankai Hawks of the Japanese Pacific League. After two seasons in Japan, Nyman finished his career in the minor leagues in 1986, playing his final season with the Nashville Sounds, then the Triple A club of the Detroit Tigers.

== Post-baseball career ==
After his baseball career ended, Nyman worked as director of operations of Seton Home Study in Front Royal, Virginia. He is married to his wife, Maureen.
