= Darrell Brown (baseball) =

American baseball player (born 1955)

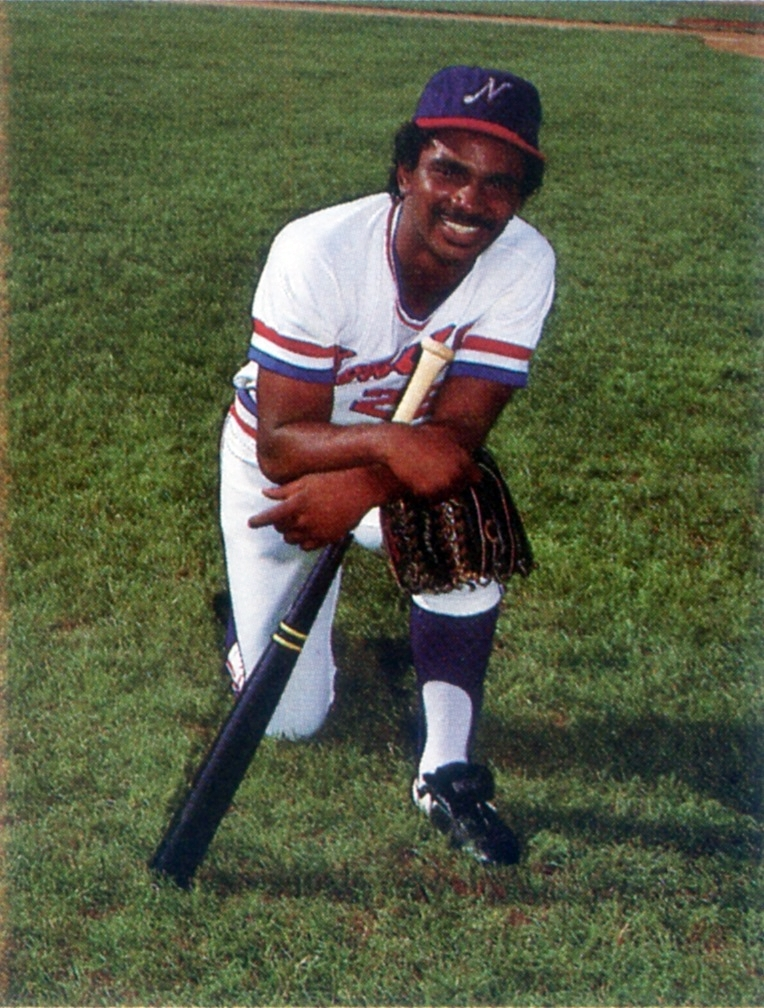
- Brown with the Nashville Sounds in 1985
- Outfielder
- Born: October 29, 1955 (age 70); Oklahoma City, Oklahoma, U.S.
- Batted: Switch Threw: Right

MLB debut
- April 11, 1981, for the Detroit Tigers

Last MLB appearance
- September 30, 1984, for the Minnesota Twins

MLB statistics
- Batting average: .274
- Home runs: 1
- Runs batted in: 44

CPBL statistics
- Batting average: .275
- Home runs: 9
- Runs batted in: 57
- Stats at Baseball Reference

Teams
- Detroit Tigers (1981); Oakland Athletics (1982); Minnesota Twins (1983–1984); Brother Elephants (1991); Wei Chuan Dragons (1992–1993)

Darrell Wayne Brown (born October 29, 1955) is an American former professional baseball player who was an outfielder in Major League Baseball (MLB).

Brown was born in Oklahoma City, Oklahoma and attended Crenshaw High School in Los Angeles, California. He played collegiately at California State University, Los Angeles.

Brown played during four seasons at the major league level for the Detroit Tigers, Oakland Athletics, and Minnesota Twins of Major League Baseball (MLB). He was drafted by the Tigers in the third round of the 1977 amateur draft. Brown played his first professional season with their Class A-Advanced Lakeland Tigers in 1977, and split his last season with the Triple-A affiliates of the San Francisco Giants (Phoenix Firebirds), Seattle Mariners (Calgary Cannons), and Texas Rangers (Oklahoma RedHawks) in 1986.
