= Randy Martz =

American baseball player (born 1956)

- Pitcher
- Born: May 28, 1956 (age 70); Harrisburg, Pennsylvania, U.S.
- Batted: Left Threw: Right

MLB debut
- September 6, 1980, for the Chicago Cubs

Last MLB appearance
- August 5, 1983, for the Chicago White Sox

MLB statistics
- Win–loss record: 17–19
- Earned run average: 3.78
- Strikeouts: 78
- Stats at Baseball Reference

Teams
- Chicago Cubs (1980–1982); Chicago White Sox (1983)

Randy Carl Martz (born May 28, 1956) is an American former Major League Baseball pitcher who played for the Chicago Cubs and Chicago White Sox.

== Career ==
In 1977, after being named the Most Valuable College Player (he went 14–0 for the University of South Carolina), he was drafted 12th overall by the Cubs. This 6 ft 4 in (1.93 m), 210 pound pitcher saw moderate success in the minors before making his Major League debut on September 6, 1980 at the age of 24 and wearing #34. In his first game, he pitched six innings, giving up five walks and five hits for the loss. Overall, he went 1–2 with a 2.08 ERA that year. Oddly, in 30+ innings of work, he struck out only five batters.

In 1981, he went 5–7 with a 3.68 ERA in 33 games, 14 started. He had a 4.21 ERA with 11–10 record in 1982, and he struck out only 40 batters in 147+ innings of work. Perhaps the highlight of his 1982 season was the two-hitter he threw against the New York Mets. The hits he gave up were to Ron Hodges.

On January 25, 1983, Martz was traded with Scott Fletcher, Pat Tabler and Dick Tidrow to the White Sox for Steve Trout and Warren Brusstar.

He only appeared in one game in 1983, starting it. He wore #33 during that game. In 5 innings of work in that August 5 game, he walked four and gave up four hits but still managed to walk away with the no-decision.

Overall in his career, he went 17–19 with a 3.78 ERA in 290+ innings of work. Although he walked only 100 batters, he was definitely not a strikeout pitcher as he struck out only 78. As a batter, he hit .165 in 79 at-bats. He had a .988 career fielding percentage.

Martz currently lives in East Alton, Illinois. He was an assistant coach at Southern Illinois University Edwardsville in 1986. He was then head coach at MacMurray College from 1987 to 1990. In 1991, he became the head coach at Lewis and Clark Community College until his retirement at the end of the 2021 season.

He was the manager of the River City Rascals of the independent Frontier League from 2003 to 2006 and also the pitching coach for the Frontier League's Gateway Grizzlies from 2007 to 2016.
