= Bob Horner =

American baseball player (1957–2026)

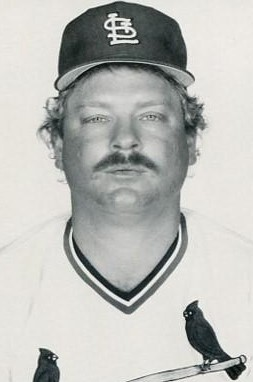
- Horner with the St. Louis Cardinals in 1988
- Third baseman / First baseman
- Born: August 6, 1957; Junction City, Kansas, U.S.
- Died: May 26, 2026 (aged 68); Irving, Texas, U.S.
- Batted: Right Threw: Right

Professional debut
- MLB: June 16, 1978, for the Atlanta Braves
- NPB: 1987, for the Yakult Swallows

Last appearance
- NPB: 1987, for the Yakult Swallows
- MLB: June 18, 1988, for the St. Louis Cardinals

MLB statistics
- Batting average: .277
- Home runs: 218
- Runs batted in: 685

NPB statistics
- Batting average: .327
- Home runs: 31
- Runs batted in: 73
- Stats at Baseball Reference

Teams
- Atlanta Braves (1978–1986); Yakult Swallows (1987); St. Louis Cardinals (1988)

Career highlights and awards
- All-Star (1982); NL Rookie of the Year (1978); Hit four home runs in one game on July 6, 1986; Golden Spikes Award (1978)

Member of the National College

Baseball Hall of Fame
- Induction: 2006

James Robert Horner (August 6, 1957 – May 26, 2026) was an American professional baseball player. He played in Major League Baseball and the Nippon Professional Baseball league as a third baseman and a first baseman from 1978 to 1988, most prominently as a member of the Atlanta Braves where he was named the 1978 National League (NL) Rookie of the Year and was a member of the 1982 National League All-Star team.

After a record-setting NCAA college athletic career with the Arizona State Sun Devils, Horner bypassed the minor leagues and moved directly to the major leagues, where together with Dale Murphy, he formed a power-hitting tandem for the Atlanta Braves teams of the early 1980s. Horner averaged 35 home runs and 109 runs batted in per his 162-game average and became the 11th player in Major League Baseball history to hit four home runs in one game on July 6, 1986.

Horner became a victim of the Major League Baseball collusion scandal of 1986–87 after the courts found that owners had illegally shared information during free agency negotiations seeking to deflate player salaries. He was among hundreds of players and former players who were awarded millions of dollars in lost salary. He played the 1987 season in the Nippon Professional Baseball (NPB) for the Yakult Swallows, before returning to play one final season in MLB with the St. Louis Cardinals in 1988. A string of injuries prematurely ended Horner's baseball career after just 11 seasons. He was inducted into the College Baseball Hall of Fame as a member of its inaugural class on July 4, 2006.

== Amateur career ==
Horner was born in Junction City, Kansas, but grew up in Glendale, Arizona. He attended Apollo High School, where he set school records.

As a freshman at Arizona State in 1976, he hit .339 with 42 RBI and nine home runs (tied with Ike Davis for third all-time by a Sun Devil freshman, two behind Barry Bonds) as ASU won the Western Athletic Conference championship and made a trip to the College World Series.

As a sophomore, Horner was a First Team All-American as he hit .389 with 87 RBI and a school record 22 home runs as ASU again won the WAC title. The Sun Devils went on to win the 1977 College World Series with Horner winning the Most Outstanding Player award.

In his junior and final season at ASU, Horner hit .412, had 100 RBI and set a new school-record with 25 home runs, leading the team to a third-consecutive conference title and another trip to the College World Series.

His college career at Arizona State University culminated with Horner again being named a First Team All-American and the first winner of the Golden Spikes Award, college baseball's equivalent of the Heisman Trophy.

Overall, at ASU, Horner batted .383 with a then-NCAA and still-standing ASU record 56 home runs and 229 RBI.

== Professional career ==
Horner was drafted by Atlanta with the first overall pick in the 1978 amateur draft, and he made his Major League Baseball debut the same year. He is among the few players who went straight from college to a starting position in the major leagues without spending any time in the minors. In his first game, he belted a home run off future Hall of Fame pitcher Bert Blyleven of the Pirates. In 89 games, Horner batted .266 with 23 home runs and 63 RBI in 323 at-bats, with an on-base percentage of .313 and a slugging percentage of .539. His 23 home runs led all National League third basemen in 1978. He won the National League Rookie of the Year award over future Hall-of-Famer Ozzie Smith.

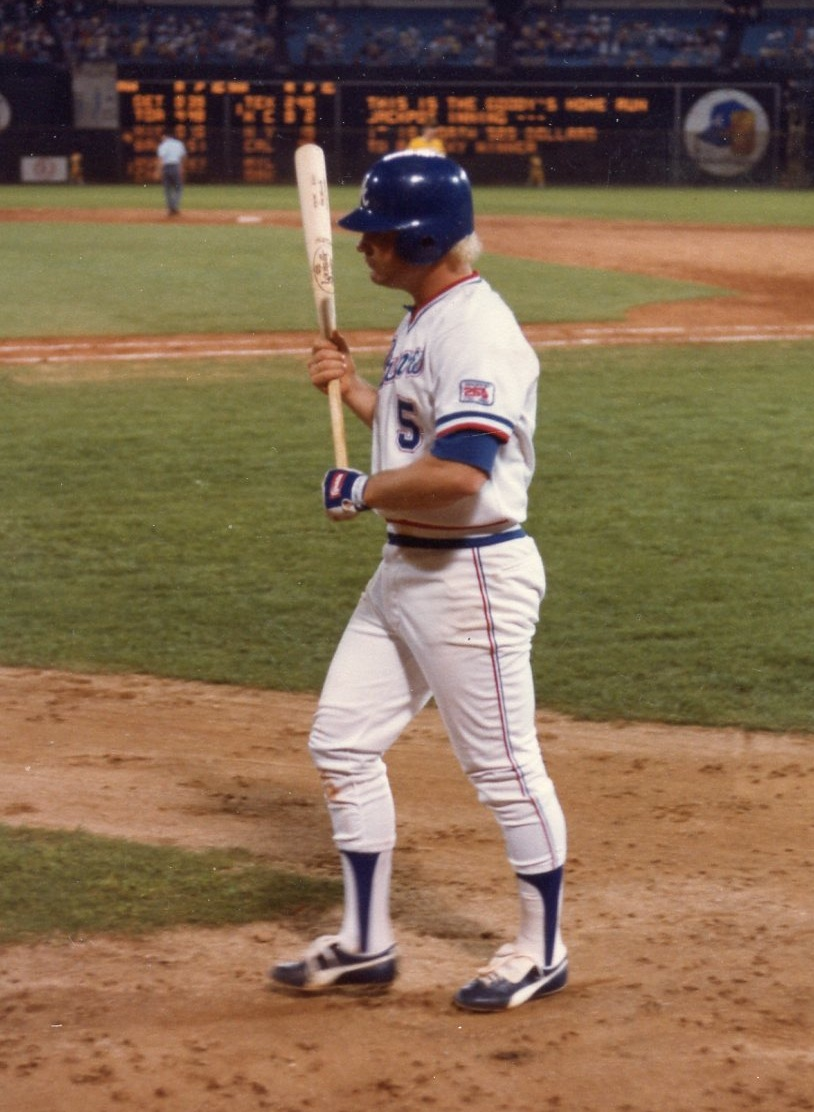
Horner with the Atlanta Braves circa 1980

In 1979, Horner batted .314 with 33 homers and 98 RBIs. In 1980, Horner posted a .268 batting average with 35 home runs and 89 RBIs, despite missing a total of 79 games over two seasons due to recurring shoulder and leg injuries. In the strike-shortened 1981 season, he hit .277 with 15 home runs and 42 RBIs in 79 games. Horner rejuvenated in 1982, finishing with 32 home runs, 97 RBIs, and an OBP of .350, while slugging .501.

In August 1983, Horner was hitting .303 with 20 homers and a career-high on-base-percentage of .383 when he fractured his right wrist while sliding, missing the last 43 games of the season. In May 1984, Horner broke his left wrist while diving after a ball and he was sidelined for the rest of the season.

In 1985, Horner played 130 games and finished with a .267 batting average, 27 home runs, and 89 RBIs. In 1986, Horner set personal career highs. On July 6, 1986, in a game against the Expos, he became the eleventh player in Major League Baseball history to hit four home runs in a single game and only the second one to do so in a game that his team lost (the first one being Ed Delahanty). Later in the season, after hitting a record 210 career home runs without a grand slam home run, Horner finally belted a homer with the bases loaded to give the Braves a 4–2 victory over the Pirates. Horner's record for homers without a grand slam stood until 1998 when Sammy Sosa surpassed the mark by hitting his first grand slam on the 248th home run of his career.

Horner became a free agent in 1987, after his first season of more than 500 at-bats. Although Horner was still near his peak, the Major League clubs were then colluding to drive down salaries, so no offers were made to Horner, whose asking price was $2 million. (In 2004, Horner received $7,034,112 from the successful lawsuit the players filed against the owners and their illegal collusion.) After failing to reach an agreement with an MLB club, Horner signed a $2 million, one-year contract with the Yakult Swallows of Japan's Central League. He was given number 50 by the organization because that was the number of home runs they expected him to hit. He ended up hitting 31 homers and had 73 RBIs for the team.

Despite Yakult offering Horner a reported $10 million for a new three-year contract, Horner returned to the majors in 1988 with the St. Louis Cardinals. After 60 games, however, he injured his left shoulder. After being invited to spring training by the Baltimore Orioles in 1989, Horner announced his retirement.

In his ten-year Major League career, Horner batted .277 with 218 home runs, 685 RBIs, 560 runs, 1,047 hits, 169 doubles, 8 triples, 14 stolen bases, a .340 on-base percentage, and a .499 slugging average in 1,020 games. Defensively, in 684 games at third base, he compiled a .946 fielding percentage, and in 330 games at first base, he posted a .994 fielding percentage. Overall, his career fielding percentage was .977.

== Personal life and death ==
Horner was married to Chris, with whom he raised two sons.

In 1979, Horner was inducted into the Sun Devil Athletics Hall of Fame. His No. 5 is honored on the outfield wall at Phoenix Municipal Stadium. On July 4, 2006, Horner was inducted into the College Baseball Hall of Fame as a member of its inaugural class. In 2022, Horner was inducted into the Georgia Sports Hall of Fame.

Horner died in Irving, Texas, on May 26, 2026, at the age of 68.

== See also ==
- List of baseball players who went directly to Major League Baseball
- List of Major League Baseball single-game home run leaders

Awards and achievements
Preceded by Wayne Gross	Topps Rookie All-Star Third Baseman; 1978	Succeeded by John Castino
Preceded by Dusty Baker	National League Player of the Month; July 1980	Succeeded by Dale Murphy
Preceded by Mike Schmidt	Batters with 4 home runs in one game July 6, 1986	Succeeded by Mark Whiten
