= 1972 College Baseball All-America Team =

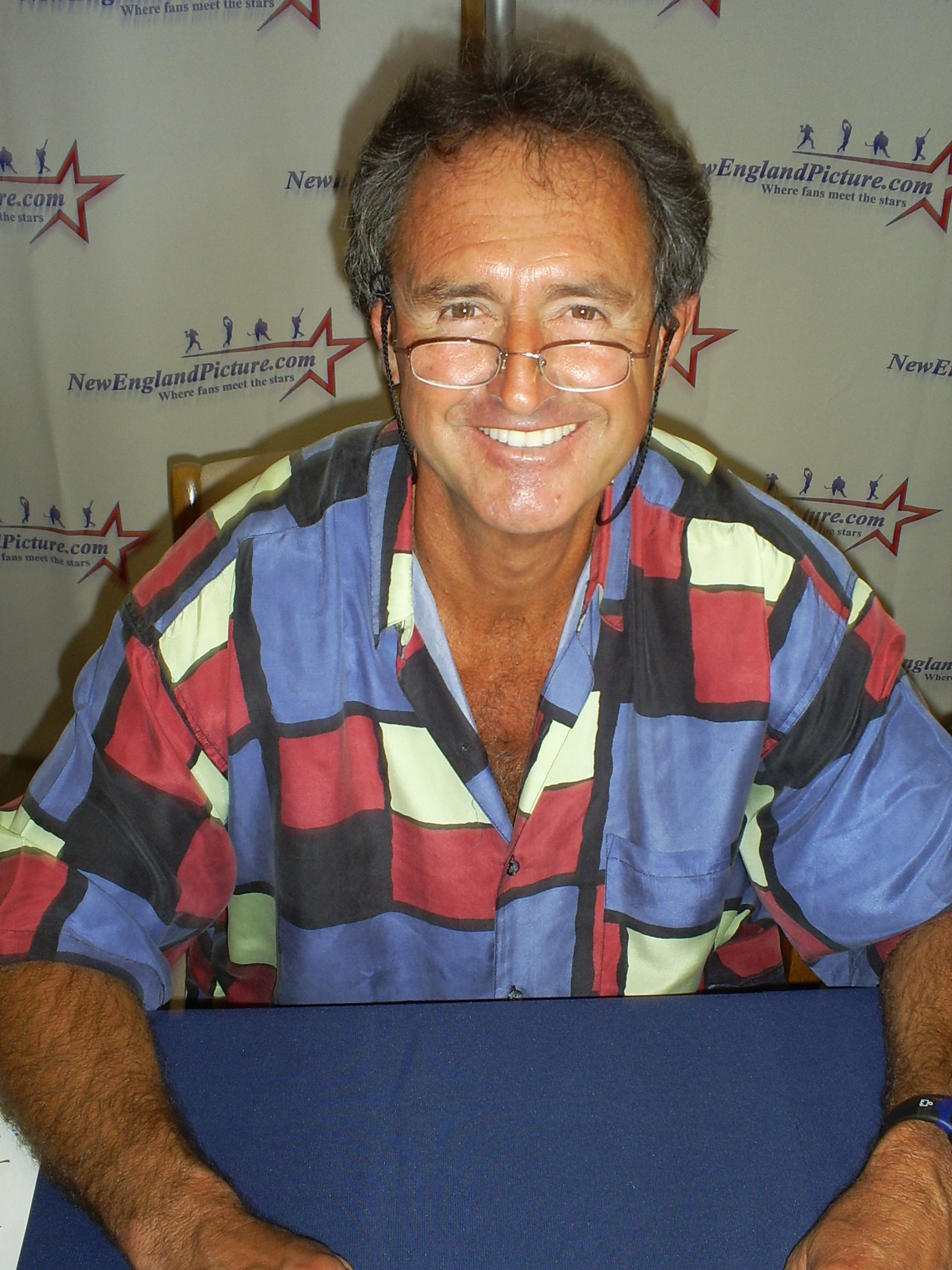
1972 All-Americans included 9× MLB All-Star Fred Lynn.

This is a list of college baseball players named first team All-Americans for the 1972 NCAA University Division baseball season. From 1964 to 1980, there were two generally recognized All-America selectors for baseball: the American Baseball Coaches Association and The Sporting News.

== Key ==
A	American Baseball Coaches Association
S	The Sporting News
	Member of the National College Baseball Hall of Fame
	Consensus All-American – selected by both organizations
	Consensus All-American – selected by one organization

== All-Americans ==
Position	Name	School	#	A	S	Other awards and honors
Pitcher	Randy Benson	Pfeiffer	1	—	✓	
Pitcher	Dick Ruthven	Fresno State	2	✓	✓	
Pitcher	Craig Swan	Arizona State	1	✓	—	
Catcher	Ron Pruitt	Michigan State	2	✓	✓	
First baseman	Doug Ault	Texas Tech	1	✓	—	
First baseman	Danny Thomas	Southern Illinois	1	—	✓	
Second baseman	Dave Chalk	Texas	1	—	✓	
Second baseman	Bobby Jack	Oklahoma	1	✓	—	
Shortstop	Alan Bannister	Arizona State	2	✓	✓	
Third baseman	Dave Roberts	Oregon	2	✓	✓	The Sporting News Player of the Year First overall pick in the 1972 MLB draft
Outfielder	John Glenn	Arizona	1	✓	—	
Outfielder	Paul Husband	Ole Miss	1	✓	—	
Outfielder	Fred Lynn	USC	2	✓	✓	
Outfielder	Willie Norwood	La Verne	1	—	✓	
Outfielder	Gene Stohs	Nebraska	1	—	✓	

== See also ==
- List of college baseball awards
