= Skip Wilson =

American baseball coach (1929–2022)

James "Skip" Wilson (October 8, 1929 – July 26, 2022) was an American college baseball head coach.

As the winningest coach in Owls sports history, Wilson was inducted into three different sports Halls of Fame: the Temple Athletics Hall of Fame in 1981, the American Baseball Coaches Association Hall of Fame in 1994, and the Pennsylvania Sports Hall of Fame in 1994.

== Early life ==
Born in the Philadelphia suburb of Germantown on October 8, 1929, Wilson was a standout three sport star at nearby St. John's High School, graduating in 1948. Wilson earned a basketball scholarship to Georgetown University, but he would drop out, opting instead to play minor league baseball.

After serving in the US Army, Wilson returned to school at Temple University, earning both a bachelor's degree in 1958 and a master's degree in health and physical education in 1961.

In addition to his extensive collegiate coaching career (which also included a stint as the freshman basketball team at Temple), Wilson taught physical education and driver training at Roxborough High School of Philadelphia for 34 years.

== Coaching career ==
Wilson coached the Temple Owls baseball team for 46 seasons, taking over for future Temple athletic director Ernie Casale in 1960. He achieved 1,034 wins, reached the NCAA tournament 12 times, and coached more than 100 professional baseball players.

Before joining the A-10, Wilson's Owls squads played in both the Middle Atlantic Conference (1960-1974) and East Coast Conference (1975-1982). Temple won four MAC conference titles, eight ECC East division titles and five ECC conference titles.

Finishing 10-1 in MAC play, the 1972 Owls reached their first College World Series, defeating Penn State twice (including 4-3 in the final) and LIU to win the District 2 championship. They would lose 2-1 to Oklahoma (led by Joe Simpson), then defeat Iowa (led by Jim Sundberg) and Connecticut in the loser's bracket before falling to eventual champion Southern Cal 4-3 in 10 innings to finish third. The Owls were led by future Major League pitching coach and manager Joe Kerrigan.

In 1977, Temple went unbeaten in ECC play and won the Northeast Regional tournament, finishing unbeaten with wins over UConn, Catholic, Cornell and St. John's to reach the 1977 College World Series (the last time the program would ever reach Omaha). Future Major League pitcher Pete Filson led the Owls.

Other notable Owl baseball players under Wilson included John Marzano, Jeff Manto, Ed Wade, Bobby Higginson and Steve Javie.

Wilson's 1,034 wins are the most of any coach in Temple University history. He earned his 1,000 career win on March 14, 2004 as Temple defeated Manhattan 10-9.

He received the Atlantic 10 Coach of the Year award in 1989 and 2001, winning the Atlantic 10 Conference title two times and the Atlantic 10 East Division three times.

Temple's former home baseball venue, Skip Wilson Field, was named for Wilson. However, the Owls baseball program was discontinued in 2014, much to Wilson's expressed dismay.

Skip Wilson died from stroke complications on July 26, 2022.

== Head coaching record ==
Record table
Season	Team	Overall	Conference	Standing	Postseason
Temple (Middle Atlantic Conference) (1960–1974)
1960	Temple	16-5	15-2	2nd	
1961	Temple	6-11-1	5-9-1	11th	
1962	Temple	13-7-1	4-3	5th	
1963	Temple	20-3	10-0	1st	NCAA Regional
1964	Temple	15-7-1	4-5		
1965	Temple	10-9-2	Unknown	3rd	
1966	Temple	20-5	7-3	2nd	
1967	Temple	22-10-1	8-6	T-3rd	
1968	Temple	25-6	10-3	1st	NCAA Regional
1969	Temple	15-11-1	9-7	5th	
1970	Temple	13-12-1	4-6	4th	
1971	Temple	9-18-1	4-8	7th	
1972	Temple	33-15	10-1	1st	College World Series
1973	Temple	33-11	9-2	1st	NCAA Regional
1974	Temple	15-18	6-4		
Temple (East Coast Conference) (1975–1982)
1975	Temple	32-16-1	11-1	1st (East)	NCAA Regional
1976	Temple	37-8-1	8-1-1	1st (East)	NCAA Regional
1977	Temple	34-9	9-0	1st (East)	College World Series
1978	Temple	32-9-1	10-0	1st (East)	NCAA Regional
1979	Temple	23-5	10-0	1st (East)	
1980	Temple	26-18	9-1	1st (East)	
1981	Temple	27-13-1	7-2	1st (East)	NCAA Regional
1982	Temple	25-10	9-1	1st (East)	
Temple (Atlantic 10 Conference) (1983–2005)
1983	Temple	27-8	9-1	1st (East)	NCAA Regional
1984	Temple	33-14	9-2	1st (East)	NCAA Regional
1985	Temple	33-18-1	9-3	1st (East)	A-10 Tournament
1986	Temple	30-17-1	8-3	2nd (East)	A-10 Tournament
1987	Temple	26-20-2	10-5-1	3rd (East)	
1988	Temple	27-27	8-8	3rd (East)	
1989	Temple	28-28-1	11-5	2nd (East)	A-10 tournament
1990	Temple	17-31	5-11	4th (East)	
1991	Temple	20-24-2	9-7	3rd (East)	
1992	Temple	15-35	5-11	4th (East)	
1993	Temple	18-21	11-9	3rd	A-10 tournament
1994	Temple	18-25	9-12	6th	
1995	Temple	16-33-1	9-15	7th	
1996	Temple	28-23-1	12-8	2nd (East)	A-10 tournament
1997	Temple	16-31	9-12	T-3rd (East)	
1998	Temple	18-28	7-11	5th (East)	
1999	Temple	28-28-1	12-9	2nd (East)	A-10 tournament
2000	Temple	24-28-3	9-11-1	3rd (East)	
2001	Temple	27-31	15-7	T-2nd	NCAA Regional
2002	Temple	22-28	11-13	2nd (East)	A-10 tournament
2003	Temple	20-27	10-14	T-4th (East)	
2004	Temple	23-26	10-14	T-4th (East)	
2005	Temple	17-33	8-16	T-4th (East)	
TOTAL:		1,034-824-27	404-276-4		
Total:		{{{overall}}}			
National champion Postseason invitational champion Conference regular season champion Conference regular season and conference tournament champion Division regular season champion Division regular season and conference tournament champion Conference tournament champion
