= 1972 NCAA University Division baseball rankings =

1972 NCAA University Division baseball season

Tournament

College World Series
- Champions: USC
- Runners-up: Arizona State
- MOP: Russ McQueen (USC)

Seasons
- ← 1971 1973 →

The following poll makes up the 1971 NCAA University Division baseball rankings. Collegiate Baseball Newspaper published its first human poll of the top 20 teams in college baseball in 1957, and expanded to rank the top 30 teams in 1961.

== Collegiate Baseball ==
Currently, only the final poll from the 1972 season is available.

Rank	Team
1	USC
2	Arizona State
3	Temple
4	Texas
5	Oklahoma
6	Connecticut
7	Iowa
8	Ole Miss
9	South Alabama
10	Tulsa
11	Jacksonville
12	Stanford
13	Bowling Green
14	Miami (OH)
15	Texas–Pan American
16	Trinity (TX)
17	UC Santa Barbara
18	Northern Illinois
19	Florida State
20	Santa Clara
21	St. John's
22	Michigan State
23	Tulane
24	Penn State
25	Washington State
26	Miami (FL)
27	TCU
28	Vanderbilt
29	BYU
30	California
