= List of Texas Longhorns in the MLB Draft =

This is a list of Texas Longhorns baseball players selected in the MLB draft.

== Key ==
	= Selected to the Major League Baseball Hall of Fame
	= Major League Baseball All-Star Game participant
**Bold**	= Selected to the College Baseball Hall of Fame

† = Currently active in the MLB
‡ = Currently active in the MiLB

=== Position key ===
Pitcher	**P**	Catcher	**C**	Infielder	**IF**	First Baseman	**1B**
Second Baseman	**2B**	Third Baseman	**3B**	Outfielder	**OF**	Left Fielder	**LF**
Center Fielder	**CF**	Right Fielder	**RF**				

== Primary June draft selections ==
Here’s the list of players that were drafted and signed in the MLB draft. Players that didn’t sign and either returned to college or retired from baseball were omitted. Only the players that were drafted and signed are on this list.

Year	Round	Pick	Overall	Name	Team	Position	Source
1965	28	8	533	Gary Moore	Los Angeles Dodgers	OF	
1965	59	4	797	Michael Thompson	St. Louis Cardinals	C	
1966	17	1	321	Richard Summers	New York Mets	C	
1967	47	2	823	Allan Clements	New York Mets	P	
1969	24	11	561	Pat Brown	New York Yankees	OF	
1970	23	1	529	Larry Hardy	San Diego Padres	P	
1971	8	4	170	Walter Rothe	Montreal Expos	OF/1B	
1972	**1**	**10**	**10**	**Dave Chalk**	**California Angels**	**3B**	
1972	16	9	369	Michael Markl	Houston Astros	2B	
1972	18	7	415	Lonnie Salyers	Cincinnati Reds	P	
1973	5	1	97	Ken Pape	Texas Rangers	SS	
1973	11	20	260	Ron Roznovsky	Houston Astros	P	
1973	16	4	364	Samuel Nicholson	San Diego Padres	P	
1973	21	16	495	Stephen Clancy	Chicago Cubs	OF	
1973	29	1	631	Rudy Jaramillo	Texas Rangers	OF	
1973	49	1	740	Jimmy Kelley	Kansas City Royals	C	
1974	19	2	427	Terry Pyka	Texas Rangers	OF	
1974	29	1	592	Bobby Cuellar	Texas Rangers	P	
1975	**1**	**17**	**17**	**Jim Gideon**	**Texas Rangers**	**P**	
1975	2	8	32	Rick Bradley	San Francisco Giants	C	
1975	5	17	113	Blair Stouffer	Texas Rangers	3B/SS	
1975	**7**	**12**	**156**	**Keith Moreland**	**Philadelphia Phillies**	**3B**	
1975	14	4	316	Mike Anderson	Chicago Cubs	C	
1975	23	7	531	Martin Flores	San Francisco Giants	P	
1976	7	4	148	Ronald Jacobs	Milwaukee Brewers	C	
1976	12	4	268	Gary Pyka	Milwaukee Brewers	2B	
1976	20	12	468	Doug Duncan	Texas Rangers	OF	
1977	2	4	30	Tony Brizzolara	Atlanta Braves	P	
1977	8	3	185	Steve Day	Milwaukee Brewers	SS	
1977	13	9	321	Don Kdner	Texas Rangers	P	
1977	14	10	348	Bob Kearney	San Francisco Giants	C	
1977	14	21	359	Mickey Reichenbach	Kansas City Royals	P	
1978	18	2	444	Robert Heuck	Toronto Blue Jays	P	
1978	23	18	576	Jim McCoy	Kansas City Royals	P	
1978	24	6	583	Kem Wright	San Francisco Giants	P	
1979	1	17	17	Jerry Don Gleaton	Texas Rangers	P	
1979	4	3	81	Andre Robertson	Toronto Blue Jays	P	
1979	5	3	107	Keith Walker	Toronto Blue Jays	P/OF	
1979	6	2	132	Ron Gardenhire	New York Mets	IF	
1979	12	16	302	Terry Salazar	Pittsburgh Pirates	1B	
1979	18	22	464	Russell Jones	Cincinnati Reds	OF	
1979	30	1	732	Mark Chellette	Seattle Mariners	3B/SS	
1980	1	21	21	Jim Acker	Atlanta Braves	P	
1980	13	3	315	Quiton Lioyd	Atlanta Braves	OF	
1980	14	22	360	Kevin Shannon	New York Yankees	OF	
1980	28	14	694	Douglas Laufer	California Angels	P	
1981	5	6	109	Burk Goldthorn	San Diego Padres	C	
1981	7	7	162	Mike Withrow	Chicago White Sox	P	
1981	8	20	201	Dave Seiler	Philadelphia Phillies	P	
1981	10	25	258	Tony Arnold	Baltimore Orioles	P	
1981	29	7	718	Larry Long	Texas Rangers	OF	
1981	29	10	721	Jimmy Tompkins	Atlanta Braves	P	
1981	30	9	741	Mike Hamer	Atlanta Braves	P	
1981	38	5	840	Chris Campbell	Montreal Expos	1B	
1982	1	6	6	Spike Owen	Seattle Mariners	SS	
1982	3	23	77	Mike Konderia	Cincinnati Reds	P	
1982	6	9	141	Rich Thompson	Atlanta Braves	OF	
1982	13	15	328	Tracy Dophied	Houston Astros	OF	
1982	23	9	579	Rusty Uresti	Atlanta Braves	C	
1982	23	13	583	Milo Choate	Philadelphia Phillies	3B	
1983	1	19	19	Roger Clemens	Boston Red Sox	P	
1983	1	27	27	Calvin Schiraldi	New York Mets	P	
1983	2	5	33	Mike Brumley	Boston Red Sox	SS	
1983	4	9	89	Jeff Hearron	Toronto Blue Jays	C	
1983	7	3	161	Kirk Killingsworth	Texas Rangers	P/OF	
1983	7	5	163	José Tolentino	Oakland Athletics	1B	
1983	13	6	320	Mike Capel	Chicago Cubs	P	
1984	33	7	778	Bryan Burrows	Pittsburgh Pirates	3B	
1984	11	21	283	Darren Loy	Philadelphia Phillies	C	
1984	13	12	326	Jamie Doughty	Texas Rangers	SS	
1985	1	9	9	Mike Poehl	Cleveland Indians	P	
1985	2	6	34	Bruce Ruffin	Philadelphia Phillies	P	
1985	4	1	81	Bill Bates	Milwaukee Brewers	2B	
1985	16	16	408	Rick Parker	Philadelphia Phillies	SS	
1985	18	2	446	Dennis Cook	San Francisco Giants	OF/P	
1985	18	7	451	Mike Simon	Seattle Mariners	OF	
1985	33	6	801	David Denny	Philadelphia Phillies	3B/OF	
1986	**1**	**2**	**2**	**Greg Swindell**	**Cleveland Indians**	**P**	
1986	9	18	229	Wade Phillips	Detroit Tigers	P	
1986	12	19	308	Daniel Peña	Los Angeles Dodgers	P	
1986	14	7	348	Doug Hodo	Philadelphia Phillies	OF	
1987	1	10	10	Kevin Garner	San Diego Padres	P/OF	
1987	1	29	29	Mark Petkovsek	Texas Rangers	P	
1987	2	23	55	Curt Krippner	Milwaukee Brewers	P	
1987	3	19	77	Scott Coolbaugh	Texas Rangers	3B	
1987	24	4	607	Lenny Bell	Chicago Cubs	1B/3B	
1987	29	19	752	John Morton	Texas Rangers	P	
1987	38	1	957	Todd Haney	Seattle Mariners	2B	
1987	47	9	1132	Elanis Westbrooks	San Francisco Giants	SS	
1988	2	2	32	Brian Johnson	Cleveland Indians	C	
1988	3	3	60	Preston Watson	Atlanta Braves	P	
1988	6	24	159	Greg Landry	Milwaukee Brewers	P	
1988	6	26	161	Eric Stone	Detroit Tigers	P	
1988	11	16	281	Joel Chimelis	Oakland Athletics	SS	
1988	14	6	349	Mike Patrick	Texas Rangers	C/3B	
1988	16	1	396	Brian Cisarik	San Diego Padres	OF	
1988	30	9	768	John Jensen	Chicago Cubs	OF	
1988	46	7	1171	Rusty Crockett	Chicago Cubs	SS	
1989	1	20	20	Scott Bryant	Cincinnati Reds	OF/P	
1989	3	12	72	Shane Reynolds	Houston Astros	P	
1989	20	17	519	Arthur Butcher	Milwaukee Brewers	OF	
1989	26	16	674	Steve Bethea	San Diego Padres	SS	
1990	**1**	**36**	**36**	**Kirk Dressendorfer**	**Oakland Athletics**	**P**	
1990	4	1	100	Johnny Walker	Atlanta Braves	OF	
1990	6	22	173	David Tollison	Toronto Blue Jays	2B	
1990	10	13	268	Mark Smith	St. Louis Cardinals	OF/P	
1990	14	19	378	Scott Fredrickson	San Diego Padres	P	
1990	31	4	805	Todd Hotz	Chicago White Sox	P	
1990	31	19	820	Mike Bradley	San Diego Padres	P	
1990	36	1	931	Brian Dare	Atlanta Braves	P	
1990	46	13	1174	Lance Jones	Texas Rangers	OF	
1991	2	17	61	Rodney Pedraza	Montreal Expos	P	
1991	5	7	133	Shane Halter	Kansas City Royals	SS	
1991	8	19	223	Roger Luce	Texas Rangers	C/P	
1991	11	8	290	Scott Pugh	San Diego Padres	1B	
1991	45	21	1181	Mike Morland	Toronto Blue Jays	C	
1991	48	7	1242	Kyle Moody	San Diego Padres	2B	
1992	1	7	7	Calvin Murray	San Francisco Giants	OF	
1992	5	19	143	Chris Abbe	Los Angeles Dodgers	C	
1992	10	10	274	John Dickens	Kansas City Royals	P	
1992	24	7	663	Clay King	San Francisco Giants	3B	
1992	27	3	743	Scott Harrison	Montreal Expos	P	
1992	38	17	1065	Robert Deleon	San Diego Padres	2B	
1992	41	28	1160	Doug Pettit	Florida Marlins	P	
1993	**1**	**10**	**10**	**Brooks Kieschnick**	**Chicago Cubs**	**OF/P**	
1993	8	3	215	Tim Harkrider	California Angels	SS	
1993	12	14	338	Darrick Duke	San Diego Padres	OF	
1993	14	5	385	Braxton Hickman	Kansas City Royals	1B	
1993	29	10	810	Gregory Hillman	Chicago Cubs	P	
1993	34	22	962	Joel Williamson	Pittsburgh Pirates	C	
1993	57	2	1509	Brian Carpenter	Los Angeles Dodgers	P	
1994	6	9	156	Clint Koppe	Cincinnati Reds	P	
1994	10	10	269	Jay Vaught	Cleveland Indians	P	
1994	10	22	281	Stephen Larkin	Texas Rangers	1B/OF	
1994	34	23	954	Jose Flores	Philadelphia Phillies	3B	
1994	37	3	1018	Jeff Conway	San Diego Padres	OF	
1994	38	8	1051	Brannon Peters	Minnesota Twins	P	
1995	1	27	27	Shea Morenz	New York Yankees	OF	
1995	4	28	115	J.D. Smart	Montreal Expos	P	
1995	18	27	506	Steve Randolph	New York Yankees	P	
1995	22	11	602	J.R Webb	Detroit Tigers	C	
1995	27	5	736	Ryan Kjos	Oakland Athletics	P	
1995	36	23	1006	Jerry Taylor	Cleveland Indians	OF	
1996	1	28	28	Danny Peoples	Cleveland Indians	1B	
1996	7	25	210	Wylie Campbell	Cincinnati Reds	2B	
1996	11	10	315	Jake O’Dell	Oakland Athletics	P	
1996	17	14	499	Roman Escamilla	Kansas City Royals	OF	
1996	21	29	634	Trey Salinas	Tampa Bay Rays	C	
1996	28	29	844	Donny Barker	Tampa Bay Rays	P	
1996	52	17	1495	Mark Cridland	Cleveland Indians	OF	
1996	53	6	1503	Matt Splawn	New York Mets	P	
1996	53	16	1513	Scott Leon	Tampa Bay Rays	P	
1997	5	24	168	Kip Harkrider	Los Angeles Dodgers	SS	
1997	21	13	637	Mark Cridland	Milwaukee Brewers	OF	
1997	38	8	1142	Mike Scarborough	Pittsburgh Pirates	OF	
1998	27	1	794	Ronald McGinnis	Philadelphia Phillies	C	
1998	34	13	1016	Curt Kautsch	Milwaukee Brewers	P	
1998	34	20	1023	Billy Martin	New York Mets	1B	
1999	4	28	142	Jason Moore	San Diego Padres	SS/3B	
1999	10	14	308	Scott Dunn	Cincinnati Reds	P	
1999	12	14	368	Joshua Spoerl	Cincinnati Reds	3B	
1999	21	9	633	Cade Sanchez	Oakland Athletics	P	
1999	30	21	916	Matthew Mize	New York Mets	2B	
1999	34	14	1028	Stace Pape	Cincinnati Reds	P	
1999	45	21	1354	Chad Ashlock	San Francisco Giants	P	
2000	1	14	14	Beau Hale	Baltimore Orioles	P	
2000	4	10	110	Chuck Thames	Anaheim Angels	P	
2000	8	5	225	Phil Seibel	Montreal Expos	P	
2000	11	12	322	Tommy Nicholson	Chicago White Sox	2B	
2000	14	11	411	Mike West	Milwaukee Brewers	SS	
2000	16	14	474	Sidney Jones	Baltimore Orioles	P	
2000	24	26	726	Christopher Houser	Cleveland Indians	3B	
2000	26	25	785	Jose Castaneda	New York Mets	C	
2000	27	23	813	Ryan Smith	Cincinnati Reds	CF	
2001	5	18	154	Gerrit Simpson	Colorado Rockies	P	
2001	12	30	376	Alberto Montez	San Francisco Giants	P	
2001	27	23	813	Ryan Smith	Cincinnati Reds	CF	
2001	19	12	568	Joel Alvarado	Milwaukee Brewers	C	
2002	1	40	40	Mark Schramek	Cincinnati Reds	IF	
2002	3	25	97	Daniel Ortmeier	San Francisco Giants	OF	
2002	4	24	126	Alan Bomer	New York Yankees	P	
2002	8	4	226	Ryan Hubele	Baltimore Orioles	C	
2002	8	24	246	Brad Halsey	New York Yankees	P	
2002	12	4	346	Brandon Fahey	Baltimore Orioles	SS/3B	
2002	14	24	426	Ray Clark	New York Yankees	P	
2002	20	24	606	Benjamin King	New York Yankees	P	
2002	26	9	771	K.J. Hendricks	Colorado Rockies	IF	
2002	41	3	1215	Marcus Townsend	Cincinnati Reds	OF	
2003	1	33	33	Omar Quintanilla	Oakland Athletics	SS	
2003	3	18	85	Tim Moss	Philadelphia Phillies	2B	
2003	3	25	92	Dustin Majewski	Oakland Athletics	OF	
2003	6	7	164	Eric Sultemeier	Baltimore Orioles	OF	
2003	8	27	244	Josh Smith	New York Yankees	P	
2003	19	29	576	Daniel Muegge	Arizona Diamondbacks	P	
2003	29	28	875	Brantley Jordan	St. Louis Cardinals	P	
2003	49	20	1448	Michael Hollimon	Minnesota Twins	SS	
2004	1	31	31	J.P. Howell	Kansas City Royals	P	
2004	1	40	40	Huston Street	Oakland Athletics	P	
2004	2	16	57	Curtis Thigpen	Toronto Blue Jays	C	
2004	13	16	387	Kyle Yates	Toronto Blue Jays	P	
2004	15	7	438	J.D. Reininger	Cincinnati Reds	3B	
2004	21	17	628	Justin Simmons	Los Angeles Dodgers	P	
2004	23	24	695	Matt Goodson	Boston Red Sox	P	
2005	2	15	63	J. B. Cox	New York Yankees	P	
2005	3	19	99	Taylor Teagarden	Texas Rangers	C	
2005	4	12	122	Sam LeCure	Cincinnati Reds	P	
2005	5	18	158	Seth Johnston	San Diego Padres	SS	
2005	16	22	492	Buck Cody	San Francisco Giants	P	
2005	23	22	702	David Maroul	San Francisco Giants	3B	
2005	28	17	847	Clayton Stewart	Philadelphia Phillies	P	
2006	1	8	8	Drew Stubbs	Cincinnati Reds	CF	
2006	1	29	29	Kyle McCulloch	Chicago White Sox	P	
2006	14	8	414	Carson Kainer	Cincinnati Reds	OF	
2007	4	30	154	Brad Suttle	New York Yankees	3B	
2007	7	21	235	Randy Boone	Toronto Blue Jays	P	
2007	8	6	250	Adrian Alaniz	Washington Nationals	P	
2007	14	3	427	James Russell	Chicago Cubs	P	
2007	14	15	439	Joseph Krebs	Cincinnati Reds	P	
2007	17	9	523	Chance Wheeless	Arizona Diamondbacks	1B	
2007	19	18	592	Nick Peoples	St. Louis Cardinals	2B	
2007	33	3	995	Preston Clark	Chicago Cubs	C	
2007	45	11	1332	Clay Van Hook	Seattle Mariners	2B	
2008	3	16	93	Kyle Russell	Los Angeles Dodgers	OF	
2008	7	8	210	Jordan Danks	Chicago White Sox	OF	
2008	11	25	347	Brandon Walker	Colorado Rockies	P	
2008	12	20	372	Kenn Kasparek	Seattle Mariners	P	
2008	30	9	901	Casey Whitmer	Washington Nationals	P	
2008	42	14	1266	Riley Boening	Minnesota Twins	P	
2009	5	6	147	Brandon Belt	San Francisco Giants	1B	
2009	5	9	150	Austin Wood	Detroit Tigers	P	
2010	1	48	48	Chance Ruffin	Detroit Tigers	P	
2010	2	7	57	Brandon Workman	Boston Red Sox	P	
2010	3	26	108	Cameron Rupp	Philadelphia Phillies	C	
2010	7	1	206	Kevin Keyes	Washington Nationals	RF	
2010	21	1	626	Connor Rowe	Washington Nationals	CF	
2010	24	1	716	Russell Moldenhauer	Washington Nationals	DH	
2011	1	12	12	Taylor Jungmann	Milwaukee Brewers	P	
2011	5	16	167	Brandon Loy	Detroit Tigers	SS	
2011	9	24	295	Cole Green	Cincinnati Reds	P	
2011	21	8	639	Andrew McKirahan	Chicago Cubs	P	
2011	24	11	732	William Shepherd	New York Mets	1B	
2011	43	29	1320	Slayton Thomas	Tampa Bay Rays	P	
2011	45	29	1380	Kevin Lusson	Tampa Bay Rays	C	
2012	7	30	248	Hoby Milner†	Philadelphia Phillies	P	
2012	11	19	357	Jonathan Walsh	Los Angeles Dodgers	OF	
2012	13	28	426	Sam Stafford	Texas Rangers	P	
2012	24	16	744	Kevin Dicharry	Washington Nationals	P	
2013	1	39	39	Corey Knebel†	Detroit Tigers	P	
2013	11	13	329	Erich Weiss	Pittsburgh Pirates	3B	
2014	6	5	170	John Curtiss‡	Minnesota Twins	P	
2014	7	17	212	Mark Payton‡	Cleveland Indians	OF	
2014	10	2	287	Dillon Peters	Miami Marlins	P	
2014	13	7	382	Nathan Thornhill	Philadelphia Phillies	P	
2014	15	6	441	Lukas Schiraldi	Seattle Mariners	P	
2015	5	2	137	Parker French	Colorado Rockies	P	
2015	11	21	336	C.J. Hinojosa‡	San Francisco Giants	SS	
2015	11	24	339	Ben Johnson	Kansas City Royals	OF	
2015	26	1	766	Kirby Bellow	Arizona Diamondbacks	P	
2015	29	4	859	Brooks Marlow	Houston Astros	2B	
2016	6	18	184	Tres Barrera	Washington Nationals	C	
2016	8	4	230	Ty Culbreth	Colorado Rockies	P	
2016	34	18	1024	Morgan Cooper	Washington Nationals	P	
2017	5	11	146	Nicholas Kennedy	Colorado Rockies	P	
2017	6	28	193	Kyle Johnston	Washington Nationals	P	
2017	8	10	236	Bret Boswell	Colorado Rockies	IF	
2017	8	24	249	Kacy Clemens	Toronto Blue Jays	1B	
2017	13	21	396	Tyler Schimpf	San Francisco Giants	P	
2017	22	16	661	Patrick Mathis	Houston Astros	OF	
2018	3	1	79	Kody Clemens†	Detroit Tigers	2B	
2018	12	8	352	Nolan Kingham	Atlanta Braves	P	
2018	12	26	370	Chase Shugart†	Boston Red Sox	P	
2018	16	24	488	Josh Sawyer	Chicago Cubs	P	
2018	28	12	836	Andy McGuire	Toronto Blue Jays	P	
2019	7	29	226	Blair Henley‡	Houston Astros	P	
2019	8	26	253	David Hamilton†	Milwaukee Brewers	SS	
2019	14	25	432	Ryan Reynolds	Chicago Cubs	3B	
2020	5	25	156	Bryce Elder‡	Atlanta Braves	P	
2021	1	32	32	Ty Madden†	Detroit Tigers	P	
2021	8	19	241	Mike Antico‡	St. Louis Cardinals	OF	
2021	9	11	263	Cole Quintanilla	Washington Nationals	P	
2021	18	10	532	Kolby Kubichek	New York Mets	P	
2021	19	7	559	Cam Williams	Kansas City Royals	IF	
2021	20	17	599	Zach Zubia‡	Miami Marlins	1B	
2022	2	4	43	Ivan Melendez‡	Arizona Diamondbacks	1B	
2022	3	17	97	Pete Hansen‡	St. Louis Cardinals	P	
2022	4	1	107	Silas Ardoin‡	Baltimore Orioles	C	
2022	6	1	167	Douglas Hodo III‡	Baltimore Orioles	OF	
2022	7	17	213	Trey Faltine‡	Cincinnati Reds	SS	
2022	10	5	291	Murphy Stehly‡	Washington Nationals	3B	
2022	12	12	358	Jared Southard‡	Los Angeles Angels	P	
2022	19	10	566	Skyler Messinger‡	Colorado Rockies	3B	
2023	4	35	136	Dylan Campbell‡	Los Angeles Dodgers	OF	
2023	6	15	179	Lucas Gordon‡	Chicago White Sox	P	
2023	12	1	345	Travis Sthele‡	Washington Nationals	P	
2023	14	24	428	Zane Morehouse‡	Cleveland Guardians	P	
2023	15	30	464	Garret Guillemette‡	Houston Astros	C	
2024	2	3	42	Jared Thomas‡	Colorado Rockies	1B/OF	
2024	5	3	139	Lebarron Johnson Jr.‡	Colorado Rockies	P	
2024	14	8	413	Tanner Witt‡	New York Mets	P	
2025	CB-B	9	74	Max Belyeu‡	Colorado Rockies	OF	
2025	11	7	322	Jared Spencer‡	Toronto Blue Jays	P	
2025	11	15	330	Jalin Flores‡	St. Louis Cardinals	SS	
2025	13	1	376	Rylan Galvan‡	Chicago White Sox	C	
2025	17	21	516	Grayson Saunier‡	Houston Astros	P	

== June secondary draft selections ==
Here’s the list of players that were drafted and signed in the MLB June secondary draft. Players that didn’t sign and either returned to college or retired from baseball were omitted. Only the players that were drafted and signed are on this list.

Year	Round	Pick	Name	Team	Position	Source
1967	5	94	James Scheschuk	Los Angeles Dodgers	C	
1970	7	105	Gene Salmon	Baltimore Orioles	1B	
1970	2	2	Tom Harmon	Kansas City Royals	C	
1971	1	18	Mike Beard	Atlanta Braves	P	
1971	**1**	**2**	**Burt Hooton**	**Chicago Cubs**	**P**	
1972	2	25	John Langerhans	Cleveland Indians	1B	
1976	1	20	Karl Pagel	Chicago Cubs	1B	
1976	**2**	**27**	**Rich Wortham**	**Chicago White Sox**	**P**	
1979	1	13	Ken Wright	Toronto Blue Jays	P	
1980	1	2	Ricky Wright	Los Angeles Dodgers	P	
1980	1	4	Keith Creel	Kansas City Royals	P	
1982	1	4	Burk Goldthorn	Pittsburgh Pirates	C	
1985	1	14	Dodd Johnson	Atlanta Braves	3B	

== Draft selections by team ==
MLB Team	No. of Selections	Earliest Selection	Latest Selection
Arizona Diamondbacks	4	Daniel Muegge (2003)	Ivan Melendez (2022)
Atlanta Braves	14	Mike Beard (1971)	Bryce Elder (2020)
Baltimore Orioles	9	Gene Salmon (1970)	Douglas Hodo III (2022)
Boston Red Sox	5	Roger Clemens (1983)	Chase Shugart (2018)
Chicago Cubs	15	Burt Hooton (1971)	Ryan Reynolds (2019)
Chicago White Sox	8	Rich Wortham (1976)	Rylan Galvan (2025)
Cincinnati Reds	20	Lonnie Salyers (1972)	Trey Faltine (2022)
Cleveland Guardians	11	John Langerhans (1972)	Zane Morehouse (2023)
Colorado Rockies	11	Gerrit Simpson (2001)	Max Belyeu (2025)
Detroit Tigers	9	Wade Phillips (1986)	Ty Madden (2021)
Houston Astros	8	Michael Markl (1972)	Grayson Saunier (2025)
Kansas City Royals	12	Tom Harmon (1970)	Cam Williams (2021)
Los Angeles Angels	5	Dave Chalk (1972)	Jared Southard (2022)
Los Angeles Dodgers	11	Gary Moore (1965)	Dylan Campbell (2023)
Miami Marlins	3	Doug Pettit (1992)	Zach Zubia (2021)
Milwaukee Brewers	13	Ronald Jacobs (1976)	David Hamilton (2019)
Minnesota Twins	4	Brannon Peters (1994)	John Curtiss (2014)
Montreal Expos	6	Walter Rothe (1971)	Phil Seibel (2000)
New York Mets	11	Richard Summers (1966)	Tanner Witt (2024)
New York Yankees	11	Pat Brown (1969)	Brad Suttle (2007)
Oakland Athletics	9	José Tolentino (1983)	Huston Street (2004)
Philadelphia Phillies	15	Keith Moreland (1975)	Nate Thornhill (2014)
Pittsburgh Pirates	6	Terry Salazar (1979)	Erich Weiss (2013)
San Diego Padres	15	Larry Hardy (1970)	Seth Johnston (2005)
San Francisco Giants	16	Rick Bradley (1975)	Tyler Schimpf (2017)
Seattle Mariners	7	Mark Chellette (1979)	Lukas Schiraldi (2014)
St. Louis Cardinals	7	Mike Thompson (1965)	Jalin Flores (2025)
Tampa Bay Rays	5	Trey Salinas (1996)	Kevin Lusson (2011)
Texas Rangers	21	Ken Pape (1973)	Sam Stafford (2012)
Toronto Blue Jays	13	Robert Heuck (1978)	Jared Spencer (2025)
Washington Nationals	12	Adrian Alaniz (2007)	Travis Sthele (2023)

== Awards, honors, and achievements from draft picks ==
=== World Series and postseason ===
**MLB World Series Champions**
Player	Position	No. of titles	Source
Roger Clemens	P	2	
Dennis Cook	P	2	
Brandon Belt	1B	2	
Burt Hooton	P	1	
Keith Moreland	3B	1	
Bill Bates	2B	1	
Greg Swindell	P	1	
Phil Seibel	P	1	
Brandon Workman	P	1	

**MLB NLCS MVP**
Player	Position	No. of titles	Source
Burt Hooton	P	1	

=== MLB All-Star selections ===
**MLB All-Star Selections**
Player	Position	No. of years	Source
Roger Clemens	P	11	
Dave Chalk	3B	2	
Huston Street	P	2	
Burt Hooton	P	1	
Greg Swindell	P	1	
Shane Reynolds	P	1	
Brandon Belt	1B	1	
Bryce Elder	P	1	
Corey Knebel	P	1	

=== MLB regular season awards ===
**MLB Cy-Young Award**
Player	Position	No. of titles	Source
Roger Clemens	P	7	

**MLB AL MVP**
Player	Position	No. of titles	Source
Roger Clemens	P	1	

**MLB Triple Crown Winner**
Player	Position	No. of titles	Source
Roger Clemens	P	2	

**MLB Wins Leader**
Player	Position	No. of years	Source
Roger Clemens	P	4	

**MLB ERA Leader**
Player	Position	No. of years	Source
Roger Clemens	P	7	

**MLB AL Strikeout Leader**
Player	Position	No. of years	Source
Roger Clemens	P	5	

**MLB AL Rookie of the Year**
Player	Position	No. of years	Source
Huston Street	P	1	

=== No-hitters ===
Date	Pitcher	Opponent	IP	K	BB	HBP	E	Score	Source
April 16, 1972	Burt Hooton	Philadelphia Phillies	9.0	7	7	0	0	4-0	

=== MLB Records ===
MLB Records
MLB Record	Player	Stat
Most Cy Young Awards	Roger Clemens	7
Most Strikeouts in a Game	Roger Clemens	20 (Note: Roger Clemens struck out 20 hitters in a game twice in his career.)
Most Consecutive Games with a Strikeout by a Relief Pitcher	Corey Knebel	45
