= 1972 NCAA University Division baseball tournament =

- Season: 1972
- Teams: 28
- Finals site: Johnny Rosenblatt Stadium; Omaha, NE
- Champions: Southern California (8th title)
- Runner-up: Arizona State (5th CWS Appearance)
- Winning coach: Rod Dedeaux (8th title)
- MOP: Russ McQueen (Southern California)

The 1972 NCAA University Division baseball tournament was played at the end of the 1972 NCAA University Division baseball season to determine the national champion of college baseball. The tournament concluded with eight teams competing in the College World Series, a double-elimination tournament in its twenty-sixth year. Eight regional districts sent representatives to the College World Series with preliminary rounds within each district serving to determine each representative. These events would later become known as regionals. Each district had its own format for selecting teams, resulting in 28 teams participating in the tournament at the conclusion of their regular season, and in some cases, after a conference tournament. The twenty-sixth tournament's champion was Southern California, coached by Rod Dedeaux. The Most Outstanding Player was Russ McQueen of the University of Southern California.

== Regionals ==
The opening rounds of the tournament were played across eight district sites across the country, each consisting of between two and six teams. The winners of each District advanced to the College World Series.

Bold indicates winner.

=== District 1 at Storrs, CT ===
Upper round 1
**Harvard**	**4***
Providence	2*
**Connecticut**	**5**
Northeastern	2
Lower round 1
Providence	3
**Northeastern**	**4**

Upper final
Harvard	5
**Connecticut**	**8**^{16}
Lower final
Northeastern	6
**Harvard**	**18**

Final
**Connecticut**	**11**	—
Harvard	2	—

=== District 2 at Princeton, NJ ===
Upper round 1
**Temple**	**3**
Penn State	1
**LIU**	**2**
St. John's	1
Lower round 1
**Penn State**	**8**
St. John's	5

Upper final
**Temple**	**1**
Long Island	0
Lower final
**Penn State**	**7**
Long Island	5

Final
**Temple**	**4**	—
Penn State	3	—

=== District 3 at Gastonia, NC ===
First round
1	**South Alabama**	**6**
6	Florida State	5
2	**Virginia**	**18**
5	Richmond	2
3	**Ole Miss**	**9**
4	Jacksonville	3

Second round
**South Alabama**	**9**
Jacksonville	6
**Virginia**	**9**
Ole Miss	3
**Florida State**	**10**
Richmond	5

Third round
**South Alabama**	**6**
Virginia	1
**Ole Miss**	**8**
Florida State	3

Semifinals
**Ole Miss**	**9**
Virginia	0

Final
South Alabama	4	1
**Ole Miss**	**8**	**12**

=== District 4 at Bowling Green, OH ===
Upper round 1
**Central Michigan**	**7**
Iowa	2
**Bowling Green**	**2**
Northern Illinois	0
Lower round 1
**Iowa**	**8**
Northern Illinois	1

Upper final
Central Michigan	5
**Bowling Green**	**7**^{10}
Lower final
**Iowa**	**4**
Central Michigan	3

Final
Bowling Green	2	5
**Iowa**	**4**	**7**

=== District 5 at Tulsa, OK ===
Finals
Tulsa	3	4	—
**Oklahoma**	**6**	**5**	—

=== District 6 at San Antonio, TX ===
Semifinals
**Texas–Pan American**	**6**
Trinity	1
**Texas**	**4**^{14}
Trinity	3

Finals
Texas-Pan American	0	1	—
**Texas**	**1**	**2**	—

=== District 7 at Mesa, AZ ===
Finals
**Arizona State**	**8**	**5**	—
Weber State	1	0	—

=== District 8 at Santa Clara, CA & Santa Barbara, CA ===
Santa Clara, CA				Santa Barbara, CA
				**Southern California**	**9**	**13**	—
**UC Santa Barbara**	1	**8**	**6**	UC Santa Barbara	5	6	—
Santa Clara	**4**	2	5

== College World Series ==
=== Participants ===
School	Conference	Record (conference)	Head coach	CWS appearances	CWS best finish	CWS record
Arizona State	WAC	60–4 (18–0)	Jim Brock	4 (last: 1969)	1st (1965, 1967, 1969)	16–5
Connecticut	Yankee	19–5 (12–0)	Larry Panciera	3 (last: 1965)	5th (1957)	2–6
Iowa	Big 10	25–15 (13–3)	Duane Banks	0 (last: none)	none	0–0
Ole Miss	SEC	28–14 (15–3)	Jake Gibbs	3 (last: 1969)	4th (1956)	3–6
Oklahoma	Big 8	34–15 (12–8)	Enos Semore	1 (last: 1951)	1st (1951)	4–0
Southern California	Pac-8	42–12–1 (14–4)	Rod Dedeaux	13 (last: 1971)	1st (1948, 1958, 1961, 1963, 1968, 1970, 1971)	43–17
Temple	Middle Atlantic	31–13 (10–1)	Skip Wilson	0 (last: none)	none	0–0
Texas	SWC	38–7 (12–6)	Cliff Gustafson	13 (last: 1970)	1st (1949, 1950)	26–23

=== Results ===
==== Bracket ====
Upper round 1
Ole Miss	6
Southern California	8
Texas	0
Connecticut	3^{10}
Temple	1
Oklahoma	2^{13}
Iowa	1
Arizona State	2

Upper round 2
Southern California	5^{11}
Connecticut	4
Oklahoma	0
Arizona State	1
Lower round 1
Ole Miss	8
Texas	9
Temple	13
Iowa	9

Upper final
Southern California	0
Arizona State	3
Lower round 2
Texas	7
Oklahoma	1
Temple	7
Connecticut	4

Semifinals
Arizona State	1
Temple	0
Texas	3
Southern California	4^{10}

Final
Arizona State	1	0
Southern California	3	1

==== Game results ====
Date	Game	Winner	Score	Loser	Notes
June 9	Game 1	Southern California	8–6	Ole Miss	
June 9	Game 2	Connecticut	3–0 (10 innings)	Texas	
June 10	Game 3	Oklahoma	2–1 (13 innings)	Temple	
June 10	Game 4	Arizona State	2–1	Iowa	
June 10	Game 5	Texas	9–8	Ole Miss	Ole Miss eliminated
June 11	Game 6	Temple	13–9	Iowa	Iowa eliminated
June 11	Game 7	Southern California	5–4 (11 innings)	Connecticut	
June 11	Game 8	Arizona State	1–0	Oklahoma	
June 12	Game 9	Temple	7–4	Connecticut	Connecticut eliminated
June 12	Game 10	Texas	7–1	Oklahoma	Oklahoma eliminated
June 12	Game 11	Arizona State	3–0	Southern California	
June 14	Game 12	Southern California	4–3 (10 innings)	Texas	Texas eliminated
June 14	Game 13	Arizona State	1–0	Temple	Temple eliminated
June 15	Game 14	Southern California	3–1	Arizona State	
June 16	Final	Southern California	1–0	Arizona State	Southern California wins CWS

=== All-Tournament Team ===
The following players were members of the All-Tournament Team.

Position	Player	School
P	Russ McQueen (MOP)	USC
P	Craig Swan	Arizona State
C	Sam Ceci	USC
1B	Daryl Arenstein	USC
2B	Ken Reed	Arizona State
3B	David Chalk	Texas
SS	Steve Dillard	Ole Miss
OF	Gary Atwell	Arizona State
OF	Tim Steele	USC
OF	Bump Wills	Arizona State

=== Notable players ===
- Arizona State: Eddie Bane, Alan Bannister, Jim Crawford, Jim Otten, Craig Swan, Jim Umbarger, Bump Wills
- Connecticut: Ed Harvey, Brian Herosian
- Iowa: Jim Sundberg
- Ole Miss: Steve Dillard
- Oklahoma: Joe Simpson, Jackson Todd
- Southern California: Fred Lynn, Ed Putman, Randy Scarbery, Roy Smalley
- Temple: Joe Kerrigan
- Texas: Dave Chalk, Bobby Cuellar, Ken Pape

=== Tournament Notes ===
Southern California becomes the first team to win three consecutive College World Series.

== See also ==
- 1972 NCAA College Division baseball tournament
- 1972 NAIA World Series
