= 1972 Arizona State Sun Devils baseball team =

American college baseball season

1972 Arizona State Sun Devils baseball
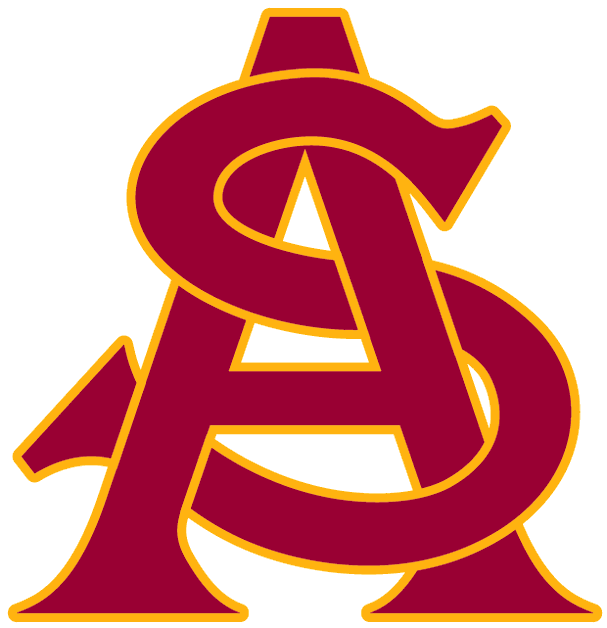

WAC Champions District 7 champions

College World Series, 2nd
- Conference: Western Athletic Conference
- CB: No. 2
- Record: 64–6 (18–0 WAC)
- Head coach: Jim Brock (2nd year)
- Home stadium: Phoenix Municipal Stadium

1972 Western Athletic Conference baseball standings
| | Conf. | | | | Overall |
| Team | W | | L | PCT | W | | L | PCT |
|---|---|---|---|---|---|---|---|---|
Northern
| BYU ^{x}‍‍‍ | 12 | – | 6 | .667 | 59 | – | 8 | .881 |
| Colorado State ‍‍‍ | 12 | – | 6 | .667 | 20 | – | 20 | .500 |
| Wyoming ‍‍‍ | 8 | – | 10 | .444 | 18 | – | 29 | .383 |
| Utah ‍‍‍ | 4 | – | 14 | .222 | 21 | – | 28 | .429 |
Southern
| No. 2 Arizona State ^{x‡y} ‍‍‍ | 18 | – | 0 | 1.000 | 64 | – | 6 | .914 |
| Arizona ‍‍‍ | 9 | – | 9 | .500 | 38 | – | 20 | .655 |
| New Mexico ‍‍‍ | 8 | – | 10 | .444 | 29 | – | 14 | .674 |
| UTEP ‍‍‍ | 1 | – | 17 | .056 | 12 | – | 39 | .235 |
x – Division champion ‡ – Championship series champion y – Invited to the NCAA tournament As of June 30, 1972; Rankings from Collegiate Baseball

The 1972 Arizona State Sun Devils baseball team represented Arizona State University in the 1972 NCAA University Division baseball season. The Sun Devils played their home games at Packard Stadium. The team was coached by Jim Brock in his first season at Arizona State.

The Sun Devils reached the College World Series, finishing as the runner up to Southern California.

== Roster ==
1972 Arizona State Sun Devils roster
| - Gary Andrews; - Greg Cochran; - Jim Foster; - Rick Glazebrook; - Mike Hughes; - Kent Jacobson; - Lee Pelekoudas; - Mike Rupchich; - Mike Stone; - Danny White | Pitchers: - Eddie Bane; - Jim Crawford; - Dale Hrovat; - Jim Otten; - Craig Swan; - Jim Umbarger | Infielders: - Alan Bannister; - Jerry Mantlo; - Ken Reed; - Rick Valley; Catchers: - Clint Myers | Outfielders: - Gary Atwell; - John Sain; - Bump Wills; kent jacobson outfielder |

== Schedule ==
Legend
| Arizona State win |
| Arizona State loss |

1972 Arizona State Sun Devils baseball game log
Regular season

February
| Date | Opponent | Site/stadium | Score | Overall record | WAC record |
|---|---|---|---|---|---|
| Feb 25 | San Diego State* | Phoenix Municipal Stadium • Phoenix, AZ | W 11–1 | 1–0 | |
| Feb 26 | San Diego State* | Phoenix Municipal Stadium • Phoenix, AZ | W 5–4 | 2–0 | |
| Feb 26 | San Diego State* | Phoenix Municipal Stadium • Phoenix, AZ | W 13–0 | 3–0 | |
| Feb 28 | Cal Poly Pomona* | Phoenix Municipal Stadium • Phoenix, AZ | W 6–5 | 4–0 | |
| Feb 29 | Cal Poly Pomona* | Phoenix Municipal Stadium • Phoenix, AZ | W 8–2 | 5–0 | |

March
| Date | Opponent | Site/stadium | Score | Overall record | WAC record |
|---|---|---|---|---|---|
| Mar 3 | San Fernando State* | Phoenix Municipal Stadium • Phoenix, AZ | W 22–0 | 6–0 | |
| Mar 4 | San Fernando State* | Phoenix Municipal Stadium • Phoenix, AZ | W 7–4 | 7–0 | |
| Mar 4 | San Fernando State* | Phoenix Municipal Stadium • Phoenix, AZ | W 8–7 | 8–0 | |
| Mar 6 | Michigan* | Phoenix Municipal Stadium • Phoenix, AZ | W 26–1 | 9–0 | |
| Mar 7 | vs Michigan* | Sun City, AZ | W 2–0 | 10–0 | |
| Mar 8 | Michigan* | Phoenix Municipal Stadium • Phoenix, AZ | W 8–3 | 11–0 | |
| Mar 9 | Chapman* | Phoenix Municipal Stadium • Phoenix, AZ | W 1–0 | 12–0 | |
| Mar 10 | Chapman* | Phoenix Municipal Stadium • Phoenix, AZ | L 4–10 | 12–1 | |
| Mar 11 | Chapman* | Phoenix Municipal Stadium • Phoenix, AZ | W 9–0 | 13–1 | |
| Mar 11 | Chapman* | Phoenix Municipal Stadium • Phoenix, AZ | W 8–3 | 14–1 | |
| Mar 16 | Northern Colorado* | Phoenix Municipal Stadium • Phoenix, AZ | W 16–0 | 15–1 | |
| Mar 17 | Northern Colorado* | Phoenix Municipal Stadium • Phoenix, AZ | W 10–2 | 16–1 | |
| Mar 18 | Northern Colorado* | Phoenix Municipal Stadium • Phoenix, AZ | W 4–0 | 17–1 | |
| Mar 18 | Northern Colorado* | Phoenix Municipal Stadium • Phoenix, AZ | W 14–1 | 18–1 | |
| Mar 20 | vs Santa Clara* | Indio, CA (Riverside Tournament) | W 5–2 | 19–1 | |
| Mar 21 | vs South Carolina* | Indio, CA (Riverside Tournament) | W 5–1 | 20–1 | |
| Mar 22 | vs Tennessee* | Indio, CA (Riverside Tournament) | W 11–5 | 21–1 | |
| Mar 22 | vs Stanford* | Indio, CA (Riverside Tournament) | W 7–2 | 22–1 | |
| Mar 23 | vs UC Riverside* | Indio, CA (Riverside Tournament) | W 5–0 | 23–1 | |
| Mar 24 | vs Cornell* | Indio, CA (Riverside Tournament) | L 1–3 | 23–2 | |
| Mar 25 | vs UCLA* | Indio, CA (Riverside Tournament) | W 12–1 | 24–2 | |
| Mar 25 | vs Stanford* | Indio, CA (Riverside Tournament) | L 2–9 | 24–3 | |
| Mar 27 | vs Wyoming* | Sun City, AZ | W 6–5 | 25–3 | |
| Mar 28 | Wyoming* | Phoenix Municipal Stadium • Phoenix, AZ | W 15–4 | 26–3 | |
| Mar 29 | Wyoming* | Phoenix Municipal Stadium • Phoenix, AZ | W 14–4 | 27–3 | |
| Mar 30 | Wyoming* | Phoenix Municipal Stadium • Phoenix, AZ | W 5–3 | 28–3 | |
| Mar 31 | La Verne* | Phoenix Municipal Stadium • Phoenix, AZ | W 8–5 | 29–3 | |

April
| Date | Opponent | Site/stadium | Score | Overall record | WAC record |
|---|---|---|---|---|---|
| Apr 1 | La Verne* | Phoenix Municipal Stadium • Phoenix, AZ | W 5–0 | 30–3 | |
| Apr 1 | La Verne* | Phoenix Municipal Stadium • Phoenix, AZ | W 4–3^{14} | 31–3 | |
| Apr 3 | Wisconsin* | Phoenix Municipal Stadium • Phoenix, AZ | W 9–4 | 32–3 | |
| Apr 4 | Wisconsin* | Phoenix Municipal Stadium • Phoenix, AZ | W 10–3 | 33–3 | |
| Apr 5 | Wisconsin* | Phoenix Municipal Stadium • Phoenix, AZ | W 7–2 | 34–3 | |
| Apr 7 | New Mexico | Phoenix Municipal Stadium • Phoenix, AZ | W 10–3 | 35–3 | 1–0 |
| Apr 8 | New Mexico | Phoenix Municipal Stadium • Phoenix, AZ | W 9–0 | 36–3 | 2–0 |
| Apr 8 | New Mexico | Phoenix Municipal Stadium • Phoenix, AZ | W 11–4 | 37–3 | 3–0 |
| Apr 11 | Grand Canyon* | Phoenix Municipal Stadium • Phoenix, AZ | W 4–1 | 38–3 | |
| Apr 14 | at UTEP | Dudley Field • El Paso, TX | W 10–4 | 39–3 | 4–0 |
| Apr 15 | at UTEP | Dudley Field • El Paso, TX | W 6–4 | 40–3 | 5–0 |
| Apr 15 | at UTEP | Dudley Field • El Paso, TX | W 12–1 | 41–3 | 6–0 |
| Apr 20 | Arizona | Phoenix Municipal Stadium • Phoenix, AZ | W 4–0 | 42–3 | 7–0 |
| Apr 21 | Arizona | Phoenix Municipal Stadium • Phoenix, AZ | W 3–2^{12} | 43–3 | 8–0 |
| Apr 22 | Arizona | Phoenix Municipal Stadium • Phoenix, AZ | W 3–2^{11} | 44–3 | 9–0 |
| Apr 28 | at New Mexico | Lobo Field • Albuquerque, NM | W 1–0 | 45–3 | 10–0 |
| Apr 29 | at New Mexico | Lobo Field • Albuquerque, NM | W 13–0 | 46–3 | 11–0 |
| Apr 29 | at New Mexico | Lobo Field • Albuquerque, NM | W 10–2 | 47–3 | 12–0 |

May
| Date | Opponent | Site/stadium | Score | Overall record | WAC record |
|---|---|---|---|---|---|
| May 2 | Northern Arizona* | Phoenix Municipal Stadium • Phoenix, AZ | W 4–0 | 48–3 | |
| May 5 | UTEP | Phoenix Municipal Stadium • Phoenix, AZ | W 30–0 | 49–3 | 13–0 |
| May 6 | UTEP | Phoenix Municipal Stadium • Phoenix, AZ | W 16–0 | 50–3 | 14–0 |
| May 6 | UTEP | Phoenix Municipal Stadium • Phoenix, AZ | W 8–0 | 51–3 | 15–0 |
| May 8 | Grand Canyon* | Phoenix Municipal Stadium • Phoenix, AZ | W 3–0 | 52–3 | |
| May 9 | Northern Arizona* | Phoenix Municipal Stadium • Phoenix, AZ | W 5–0 | 53–3 | |
| May 11 | at Arizona | Wildcat Field • Tucson, AZ | W 6–0 | 54–3 | 16–0 |
| May 12 | at Arizona | Wildcat Field • Tucson, AZ | W 9–4 | 55–3 | 17–0 |
| May 13 | at Arizona | Wildcat Field • Tucson, AZ | W 7–3 | 56–3 | 18–0 |

Postseason

WAC playoffs
| Date | Opponent | Site/stadium | Score | Overall record | WAC CS Record |
|---|---|---|---|---|---|
| May 26 | at BYU | Provo, UT | L 5–6^{10} | 56–4 | 0–1 |
| May 27 | at BYU | Provo, UT | W 20–5 | 57–4 | 1–1 |
| May 27 | at BYU | Provo, UT | W 21–7 | 58–4 | 2–1 |

NCAA District 7 playoff
| Date | Opponent | Site/stadium | Score | Overall record | NCAAT record |
|---|---|---|---|---|---|
| June 1 | Weber State | Rendezvous Park • Mesa, AZ | W 8–1 | 59–4 | 1–0 |
| June 2 | Weber State | Rendezvous Park • Mesa, AZ | W 5–0 | 60–4 | 2–0 |

College World Series
| Date | Opponent | Site/stadium | Score | Overall record | CWS record |
|---|---|---|---|---|---|
| June 10 | Iowa | Johnny Rosenblatt Stadium • Omaha, NE | W 2–1 | 61–4 | 1–0 |
| June 11 | Oklahoma | Johnny Rosenblatt Stadium • Omaha, NE | W 1–0 | 62–4 | 2–0 |
| June 12 | Southern California | Johnny Rosenblatt Stadium • Omaha, NE | W 3–0 | 63–4 | 3–0 |
| June 14 | Temple | Johnny Rosenblatt Stadium • Omaha, NE | W 1–0 | 64–4 | 4–0 |
| June 15 | Southern California | Johnny Rosenblatt Stadium • Omaha, NE | L 1–3 | 64–5 | 4–1 |
| June 16 | Southern California | Johnny Rosenblatt Stadium • Omaha, NE | L 0–1 | 64–6 | 4–2 |
