= Enos Semore =

American college baseball coach (1931–2025)

Biographical details
- Born: April 28, 1931; Haskell County, Oklahoma, U.S.
- Died: February 23, 2025 (aged 93); Noble, Oklahoma

Playing career

Baseball
- 1953–1956: Northeastern State

Basketball
- 1952–1956: Northeastern State

Coaching career (HC unless noted)
- 1963–1967: Bacone
- 1968–1989: Oklahoma

Head coaching record
- Overall: 851–370–1 (.697)

Accomplishments and honors

Championships
- 7 Big 8; 1 JUCO World Series (1967)

Enos Semore (April 28, 1931 – February 23, 2025) was an American college baseball coach.

== Biography ==
Semore was born on April 28, 1931. He attended Keota High School and Northeastern State University, where he played baseball and basketball. Semore was the head baseball coach at Bacone College from 1963 to 1967 and won a JUCO World Series title in 1967. After Bacone he was the head baseball coach at the University of Oklahoma from 1968 until 1989. During his tenure, the Sooners won 851 games, six conference championships and played in five College World Series. He resigned just days before the start of the 1990 season for medical reasons; assistant Stan Meek served as interim coach that season. Semore died on February 23, 2025, at the age of 93.

== Head coaching record ==
Record table
| Season | Team | Overall | Conference | Standing | Postseason |
|---|---|---|---|---|---|
Oklahoma Sooners (Big Eight Conference) (1968–1989)
| 1968 | Oklahoma | 13–14 | 10–8 | 3rd | |
| 1969 | Oklahoma | 23–10 | 17–4 | 2nd | |
| 1970 | Oklahoma | 20–17 | 10–9 | 4th | |
| 1971 | Oklahoma | 24–11 | 13–8 | T–2nd | |
| 1972 | Oklahoma | 35–17 | 12–8 | 1st | College World Series |
| 1973 | Oklahoma | 48–12 | 17–4 | 1st | College World Series |
| 1974 | Oklahoma | 43–8 | 18–3 | 1st | College World Series |
| 1975 | Oklahoma | 52–10 | 15–3 | 1st | College World Series |
| 1976 | Oklahoma | 62–19 | 15–3 | 2nd | College World Series |
| 1977 | Oklahoma | 37–11 | 9–1 | T–1st | NCAA regional |
| 1978 | Oklahoma | 39–20 | 10–2 | 1st | |
| 1979 | Oklahoma | 36–27 | 12–8 | T–3rd | NCAA regional |
| 1980 | Oklahoma | 33–24–1 | 8–10 | 5th | |
| 1981 | Oklahoma | 40–15 | 11–13 | 5th | |
| 1982 | Oklahoma | 35–25 | 11–6 | 3rd | NCAA regional |
| 1983 | Oklahoma | 39–20 | 18–6 | 2nd | |
| 1984 | Oklahoma | 42–15 | 14–4 | 2nd | NCAA regional |
| 1985 | Oklahoma | 55–14 | 18–6 | 2nd | NCAA regional |
| 1986 | Oklahoma | 44–21 | 19–3 | 1st | NCAA regional |
| 1987 | Oklahoma | 42–20 | 17–7 | 2nd | NCAA regional |
| 1988 | Oklahoma | 45–21 | 16–8 | 2nd | NCAA regional |
| 1989 | Oklahoma | 44–19 | 18–6 | 3rd | NCAA regional |
| Oklahoma: | | 851–370–1 (.697) | 297–129 (.697) | | |
| Total: | | 851–370–1 (.697) | | | |
National champion Postseason invitational champion Conference regular season champion Conference regular season and conference tournament champion Division regular season champion Division regular season and conference tournament champion Conference tournament champion
