= 1972 Texas Longhorns baseball team =

American college baseball season

1972 Texas Longhorns baseball

SWC champions

College World Series, 2–2
- Conference: Southwest Conference
- Record: 50–9 (12–6 SWC)
- Head coach: Cliff Gustafson (5th year)
- Home stadium: Clark Field

1972 Southwest Conference baseball standings
	Conf.				Overall
Team	W		L	PCT	W		L	PCT
No. 4 Texas ‍†‍‍^{y}	12	–	6	.667	50	–	9	.847
No. 27 TCU ‍†‍‍	12	–	6	.667	29	–	13	.690
Rice ‍‍‍	11	–	7	.611	19	–	12	.613
Texas A&M ‍‍‍	10	–	8	.556	27	–	11	.711
SMU ‍‍‍	6	–	12	.333	22	–	30	.423
Texas Tech ‍‍‍	6	–	12	.333	23	–	19	.548
Baylor ‍‍‍	6	–	12	.333	20	–	20	.500
† – Conference champion y – Invited to the NCAA tournament As of June 30, 1972; Rankings from Collegiate Baseball

The 1972 Texas Longhorns baseball team represented the University of Texas at Austin in the 1972 NCAA University Division baseball season. The Longhorns played their home games at Clark Field. The team was coached by Cliff Gustafson in his 5-th season at Texas.

The Longhorns reached the College World Series, finishing tied for third with wins over Ole Miss and Oklahoma and losses to Connecticut and a ten-inning loss to eventual champion Southern California.

== Personnel ==
=== Roster ===
1972 Texas Longhorns roster
Pitchers: 5 - Bobby Cuellar; 8 - Martin F. Flores; 10 - Ron Roznovsky; Catchers: 19 - Bill Berryhill	Infielders: 2 - Mike Markl; 3 - Dave Chalk; 7 - John D. Langerhans; 9 - Ken Pape; Outfielders: 4 - Terry Pyka	Unknown: 1 - Amador G. Tijerina; 12 - James Ray Brown; 13 - Thomas Henry Ball; 14 - Charlie E. Crenshaw; 15 - Dennis George Magro; 16 - Steven Michael Clancy; 17 - Zane Grubbs; 22 - Samuel Nicholson; 24 - Jim McCutchen

== Schedule and results ==
Legend
Texas win
Texas loss
Tie

1972 Texas Longhorns baseball game log
Regular season

February
Date	Opponent	Site/stadium	Score	Overall record	SWC record
Feb 25	Sam Houston State*	Clark Field • Austin, TX	W 4–3	1–0	
Feb 25	Sam Houston State*	Clark Field • Austin, TX	W 3–0	2–0	
Feb 26	Sam Houston State*	Clark Field • Austin, TX	W 8–1	3–0	
Feb 26	Sam Houston State*	Clark Field • Austin, TX	W 8–1	4–0	
Feb 29	Texas Lutheran*	Clark Field • Austin, TX	W 2–0	5–0	
Feb 29	Texas Lutheran*	Clark Field • Austin, TX	W 7–1	6–0	

March
Date	Opponent	Site/stadium	Score	Overall record	SWC record
Mar 3	Oklahoma*	Clark Field • Austin, TX	W 13–6	7–0	
Mar 3	Oklahoma*	Clark Field • Austin, TX	L 1–5	7–1	
Mar 4	Oklahoma*	Clark Field • Austin, TX	W 10–1	8–1	
Mar 4	Oklahoma*	Clark Field • Austin, TX	W 2–1	9–1	
Mar 7	St. Mary's*	Clark Field • Austin, TX	W 7–0	10–1	
Mar 7	St. Mary's*	Clark Field • Austin, TX	W 7–2	11–1	
Mar 10	Houston*	Clark Field • Austin, TX	W 9–2	12–1	
Mar 10	Houston*	Clark Field • Austin, TX	W 7–0	13–1	
Mar 11	Houston*	Clark Field • Austin, TX	W 7–2	14–1	
Mar 11	Houston*	Clark Field • Austin, TX	W 5–1	15–1	
Mar 14	at Texas Lutheran*	Seguin, TX	W 5–1	16–1	
Mar 14	at Texas Lutheran*	Seguin, TX	W 4–1	17–1	
Mar 17	Baylor	Clark Field • Austin, TX	W 4–1	18–1	1–0
Mar 17	Baylor	Clark Field • Austin, TX	W 6–5	19–1	2–0
Mar 18	Baylor	Clark Field • Austin, TX	W 19–2	20–1	3–0
Mar 22	Minnesota*	Clark Field • Austin, TX	W 3–2	21–1	
Mar 22	Minnesota*	Clark Field • Austin, TX	W 14–4	22–1	
Mar 23	Minnesota*	Clark Field • Austin, TX	W 14–2	23–1	
Mar 23	Minnesota*	Clark Field • Austin, TX	W 8–3	24–1	
Mar 25	at St. Mary's*	San Antonio, TX	W 6–0	25–1	
Mar 25	at St. Mary's*	San Antonio, TX	W 11–1	26–1	
Mar 31	at Texas Tech	Lubbock, TX	W 5–1	27–1	4–0
Mar 31	at Texas Tech	Lubbock, TX	L 4–5	27–2	4–1

April/May
Date	Opponent	Site/stadium	Score	Overall record	SWC record
Apr 1	at Texas Tech	Lubbock, TX	W 12–5	28–2	5–1
Apr 7	at Rice	Houston, TX	L 3–10	28–3	5–2
Apr 7	at Rice	Houston, TX	L 0–4	28–4	5–3
Apr 8	at Rice	Houston, TX	L 4–8	28–5	5–4
Apr 14	SMU	Clark Field • Austin, TX	W 8–2	29–5	6–4
Apr 14	SMU	Clark Field • Austin, TX	W 11–0	30–5	7–4
Apr 15	SMU	Clark Field • Austin, TX	W 15–3	31–5	8–4
Apr 21	at TCU	TCU Diamond • Fort Worth, TX	L 1–2	31–6	8–5
Apr 21	at TCU	TCU Diamond • Fort Worth, TX	W 8–5	32–6	9–5
Apr 22	at TCU	TCU Diamond • Fort Worth, TX	W 5–1	33–6	10–5
Apr 28	Texas A&M	Clark Field • Austin, TX	W 4–2	34–6	11–5
Apr 28	Texas A&M	Clark Field • Austin, TX	L 6–7	34–7	11–6
Apr 29	Texas A&M	Clark Field • Austin, TX	W 10–6	35–7	12–6
May 13	Austin Aztecas*	Clark Field • Austin, TX	W 8–2	36–7	
May 13	Austin Aztecas*	Clark Field • Austin, TX	W 7–2	37–7	

Postseason

District 6 playoffs
Date	Opponent	Site/stadium	Score	Overall record	NCAAT record
May 18	Trinity	San Antonio, TX	W 4–3^{14}	38–7	1–0
May 19	Texas–Pan American	San Antonio, TX	W 1–0	39–7	2–0
May 19	Texas–Pan American	San Antonio, TX	W 2–1	40–7	3–0

Exhibitions
Date	Opponent	Site/stadium	Score	Overall record
May 29	at LaGrange Demons	LaGrange, TX	W 2–1	41–7
May 29	at LaGrange Demons	LaGrange, TX	W 14–3	42–7
May 31	Austin Aztecas	Clark Field • Austin, TX	W 6–1	43–7
May 31	Austin Aztecas	Clark Field • Austin, TX	W 3–1	44–7
June 1	LaGrange Demons	Clark Field • Austin, TX	W 8–5	45–7
June 1	LaGrange Demons	Clark Field • Austin, TX	W 9–4	46–7
June 2	Fort Hood All-Stars	Clark Field • Austin, TX	W 3–2	47–7
June 2	Fort Hood All-Stars	Clark Field • Austin, TX	W 5–1	48–7

College World Series
Date	Opponent	Site/stadium	Score	Overall record	CWS record
June 9	Connecticut	Johnny Rosenblatt Stadium • Omaha, NE	L 0–3	48–8	0–1
June 10	Ole Miss	Johnny Rosenblatt Stadium • Omaha, NE	W 9–8	49–8	1–1
June 12	Oklahoma	Johnny Rosenblatt Stadium • Omaha, NE	W 7–1	50–8	2–1
June 14	Southern California	Johnny Rosenblatt Stadium • Omaha, NE	L 3–4^{10}	50–9	2–2
