= Duane Banks =

American baseball coach and player

Biographical details
- Born: 1941 (age 84–85); Grand Junction, Colorado, U.S.

Playing career
- 1959: Colorado State
- 1960–1962: Mesa Junior College
- 1963–1964: Colorado State
- 1964: SRL Braves
- Position: Catcher

Coaching career (HC unless noted)
- 1965: Colorado State (asst.)
- 1966: Parsons (asst.)
- 1967–1968: Parsons
- 1969: Colorado State (asst.)
- 1970: Iowa (asst.)
- 1970–1997: Iowa

Head coaching record
- Overall: 901–585–4
- Tournaments: Big Ten: 4–8; NCAA: 4–7

Accomplishments and honors

Championships
- 3× Big Ten Conference (1972, 1974, 1990)

Awards
- 3× All-Rocky Mountain (1959, 1963, 1964); Big Ten Coach of the Year (1990)

Donald Duane Banks (born 1941) is a former American college baseball coach and catcher. He played professional baseball in 1964, before returning to college. He was the head baseball coach at the University of Iowa from 1970 to 1997.

== Head coaching record ==
Record table
Season	Team	Overall	Conference	Standing	Postseason
Parsons Wildcats () (1967–1968)
Parsons:		91–10			
Iowa Hawkeyes (Big Ten Conference) (1970–1997)
1970	Iowa	14–13	6–11	9th	
1971	Iowa	28–17	10–8	5th	
1972	Iowa	25–17	13–3	1st	College World Series
1973	Iowa	16–14–1	8–10	T-7th	
1974	Iowa	27–13	11–5	T-1st	
1975	Iowa	29–14	11–3	2nd	Midwest Regional
1976	Iowa	23–16	9–7	T-5th	
1977	Iowa	40–14	10–8	T-4th	
1978	Iowa	28–17	9–6	4th	
1979	Iowa	32–12	10–6	5th	
1980	Iowa	31–14	11–5	3rd	
1981	Iowa	44–21	8–6	3rd (West)	
1982	Iowa	31–21	5–11	5th (West)	
1983	Iowa	32–21–1	7–7	2nd (West)	Big Ten tournament
1984	Iowa	31–26	7–8	3rd (West)	
1985	Iowa	40–20	9–7	T-2nd (West)	
1986	Iowa	29–27	2–13	5th (West)	
1987	Iowa	40–20	9–7	T-2nd (West)	Big Ten tournament
1988	Iowa	29–25	14–14	6th	
1989	Iowa	37–20	17–11	T-2nd	Big Ten tournament
1990	Iowa	38–19	22–6	1st	Northeast Regional
1991	Iowa	26–28–1	11–17	9th	
1992	Iowa	26–28	12–16	7th	
1993	Iowa	32–20	13–13	6th	
1994	Iowa	22–32–1	13–15	T-3rd	
1995	Iowa	29–24	13–15	7th	
1996	Iowa	25–22	13–13	7th	
1997	Iowa	17–30	7–16	10th	
Iowa:		810–575–4	290–267		
Total:		901–585–4			
National champion Postseason invitational champion Conference regular season champion Conference regular season and conference tournament champion Division regular season champion Division regular season and conference tournament champion Conference tournament champion
