= 1972 Connecticut Huskies baseball team =

American college baseball season

1972 Connecticut Huskies baseball

Yankee Conference Champion NCAA District 1 playoff champion

College World Series, 1–2
- Conference: Yankee Conference
- Record: 20–7 (12–0 Yankee)
- Head coach: Larry Panciera (11th season)
- Home stadium: J.O. Christian Field

1972 Yankee Conference baseball standings
	Conf.				Overall
Team	W		L	PCT	W		L	PCT
No. 6 Connecticut ‍†‍‍^{y}	12	–	0	1.000	20	–	7	.741
Maine ‍‍‍	8	–	4	.667	20	–	7	.741
UMass ‍‍‍	8	–	4	.667	16	–	5	.762
New Hampshire ‍‍‍	6	–	6	.500	10	–	9	.526
Rhode Island ‍‍‍	5	–	7	.417	7	–	11	.389
Holy Cross ‍‍‍	3	–	9	.250	5	–	21	.192
Boston University ‍‍‍	0	–	12	.000	2	–	22	.083
† – Conference champion y – Invited to the NCAA tournament As of June 30, 1972; Rankings from Collegiate Baseball

The 1972 Connecticut Huskies baseball team represented the University of Connecticut in the 1972 NCAA University Division baseball season. The Huskies were led by Larry Panciera in his 11th year as head coach, and played as part of the Yankee Conference. Connecticut posted a 20–7 record, won the Yankee Conference with an undefeated regular season, swept the NCAA District 1 playoff and reached the 1972 College World Series, their fourth appearance in the penultimate college baseball event. The Huskies won their first game against Texas before falling to eventual champion Southern California in extra innings and being eliminated by Temple the next day.

== Roster ==
1972 Connecticut Huskies roster
- Bob Bonn; - Ray Brickley; - Sandy Bryant; - Bill Franklin; - Augie Garbatani; - Ed Harvey; - Charlie Horan; - Keith Kraham; - Mitch Moore	- Steve Lake; - Brad Linden; - Rich Safier; - Tom Safir; - John Slosar; - John Tokarz; - Harry Trohalis; - Dan Went	Pitchers: - John Baldwin; - Brian Herosian; - Jim Jachym; Catchers Infielders: - John Ihlenberg; Outfielders

== Schedule ==
1972 Connecticut Huskies baseball game log
Regular season

March
Date	Opponent	Site/stadium	Score	Overall record	YC Record
Mar 24	at Stetson*	DeLand, FL	L 0–3	0–1	
Mar 25	at Stetson*	DeLand, FL	L 0–4	0–2	
Mar 27	at Florida Southern*	Lakeland, FL	L 3–7	0–3	
Mar 28	at Saint Leo*	St. Leo, FL	L 6–8	0–4	
Mar 29	at Saint Leo*	St. Leo, FL	W 3–2	1–4	
Mar 30	at South Florida*	Tampa, FL	W 8–3	2–4	

April
Date	Opponent	Site/stadium	Score	Overall record	YC Record
Apr 10	Holy Cross	J. O. Christian Field • Storrs, CT	W 6–2	3–4	1–0
Apr 14	Rhode Island	J. O. Christian Field • Storrs, CT	W 4–0	4–4	2–0
Apr 15	at Rhode Island	Bill Beck Field • Kingston, RI	W 6–1	5–4	3–0
Apr 19	at Holy Cross	Fitton Field • Worcester, MA	W 10–5	6–4	4–0
Apr 21	Maine	J. O. Christian Field • Storrs, CT	W 1–0	7–4	5–0
Apr 22	Maine	J. O. Christian Field • Storrs, CT	W 6–2	8–4	6–0
Apr 25	at Brown*	Murray Stadium • Providence, RI	L 2–3	8–5	
Apr 28	New Hampshire	J. O. Christian Field • Storrs, CT	W 3–2	9–5	7–0
Apr 29	New Hampshire	J. O. Christian Field • Storrs, CT	W 2–1	10–5	8–0

May
Date	Opponent	Site/stadium	Score	Overall record	YC Record
May 5	at Boston University	W 18–1	11–5	9–0	
May 6	Boston University	J. O. Christian Field • Storrs, CT	W 6–4	12–5	10–0
May 7	at Coast Guard*	New London, CT	W 13–5	13–5	
May 10	Boston College*	J. O. Christian Field • Storrs, CT	W 10–2	14–5	
May 13	at UMass	Earl Lorden Field • Amherst, MA	W 9–3	15–5	11–0
May 14	UMass	J. O. Christian Field • Storrs, CT	W 13–3	16–5	12–0

Postseason

NCAA tournament: District 1 playoff
Date	Opponent	Site/stadium	Score	Overall record	Regional Record
May 27	Northeastern	J. O. Christian Field • Storrs, CT	W 5–2	17–5	1–0
May 27	Harvard	J. O. Christian Field • Storrs, CT	W 8–5^{16}	18–5	2–0
May 28	Harvard	J. O. Christian Field • Storrs, CT	W 11–2	19–5	3–0

College World Series
Date	Opponent	Site/stadium	Score	Overall record	CWS record
June 9	Texas	Johnny Rosenblatt Stadium • Omaha, NE	W 3–0^{10}	20–5	1–0
June 11	Southern California	Johnny Rosenblatt Stadium • Omaha, NE	L 4–5^{11}	20–6	1–1
June 12	Temple	Johnny Rosenblatt Stadium • Omaha, NE	L 4–7	20–7	1–2
