= Erny Field =

Baseball field in Philadelphia, Pennsylvania

- Location within Pennsylvania Erny Field (the United States)
- Interactive map of Erny Field
- Address: 8122 Michener Avenue; Philadelphia, Pennsylvania; USA
- Coordinates: 40°04′36.7″N 75°10′10.2″W
- Surface: Natural grass
- Field size: Left Field: 0 feet (0 m); Center Field: 400 feet (122 m); Right Field: 0 feet (0 m)

Construction
- Opened: April 11, 1930
- Renovated: 2015

Tenants
- Temple University (NCAA D-I) 1930–2003; Arcadia University (NCAA D-III) 2004–2017

Erny Field is a baseball field at Mount Pleasant Avenue and Michener Street in the West Oak Lane neighborhood of Philadelphia. It is adjacent to the former site of Temple Stadium. Erny Field was the home field of the Arcadia University baseball team from 2004 until 2017. The Temple University baseball team played its home games at the baseball field from 1930 until 2003.

The field is named for Charles Erny (1889–1963), a benefactor of Temple University and its athletic program.

== History ==
Temple University's baseball team inaugurated the field on April 11, 1930. Philadelphia Mayor Harry Mackey and Philadelphia Athletics manager Connie Mack were present for the game, as were the Athletics' Ira Thomas, Phillies scout Joe O'Rourke, Temple president Dr Charles Buery, and local businessman and Temple benefactor Charles Erny. Temple's baseball team was defeated by Fordham 3–2 in the game in front of 500 fans.

Temple would play their home games at Erny Field from 1930 until 2003 when they moved to Skip Wilson Field. Temple hosted East Coast Conference tournament games at Erny Field in 1978, 1980, and 1982.

Arcadia University began playing its home games at the field in 2004 and completed a series of upgrades at the field in 2015. Arcadia releveled the field, installed a new irrigation system, rebuilt the home and visiting bullpen areas, and installed new batting cages down the first base line. Arcadia's baseball team moved their home games to Skip Wilson Field in 2018.

Erny Field has been the site of the Philadelphia Public League baseball championship. Erny Field hosted Philadelphia Catholic League baseball playoff games in 1959 and from 1973 through 1979.

== See also ==
- Skip Wilson Field
- Temple Stadium
