= 1972 Oklahoma Sooners baseball team =

American college baseball season

1972 Oklahoma Sooners baseball

NCAA District 5 champions Big Eight Conference champions

College World Series, 1–2
- Conference: Big Eight Conference
- Record: 35–17 (12–8 Big Eight)
- Head coach: Enos Semore (5th year)
- Home stadium: Haskell Park

1972 Big Eight Conference baseball standings
	Conf.				Overall
Team	W		L	PCT	W		L	PCT
No. 5 Oklahoma ‍†‍‍^{y}	12	–	8	.600	35	–	17	.673
Colorado ‍‍‍	10	–	8	.556	22	–	18	.550
Kansas ‍‍‍	11	–	9	.550	20	–	10	.667
Kansas State ‍‍‍	9	–	9	.500	17	–	17	.500
Oklahoma State ‍‍‍	10	–	10	.500	15	–	17	.469
Missouri ‍‍‍	9	–	11	.450	16	–	16	.500
Nebraska ‍‍‍	8	–	11	.421	12	–	17	.414
Iowa State ‍‍‍	7	–	10	.412	13	–	18	.419
† – Conference champion y – Invited to the NCAA tournament As of June 30, 1972; Rankings from Collegiate Baseball

The 1972 Oklahoma Sooners baseball team represented the University of Oklahoma in the 1972 NCAA University Division baseball season. The Sooners played their home games at Haskell Park, and played as part of the Big Eight Conference. The team was coached by Enos Semore in his fifth season as head coach at Oklahoma.

The Sooners reached the College World Series, their second appearance in Omaha, where they finished tied for fifth place after recording an opening round win against eventual semifinalist Temple and losing games to runner-up Arizona State and Texas.

== Personnel ==
=== Roster ===
1972 Oklahoma Sooners roster
Pitchers: 1 – Stan Meek; 10 – Gary Weese; 13 – Richard A. Jacobs; 16 – Jackson Todd; 18 – Kim E. Cook	Catchers: 12 – Glenn Bannister; Outfielders: 7 – Bill Severns; 8 – Joe Simpson; 9 – Kenny King; Infielders: 5 – Charles Redmon; 6 – Mike Ford; 23 – Bobby Jack	Unknown: – Gary Fleming; 14 – Patrick Sullivan; 15 – Mike Marino; 17 – Terry Jolly; 18 – Steve Megless; 22 – Dean Byrom

=== Coaches ===
1972 Oklahoma Sooners baseball coaching staff
- - Enos Semore – head coach - 5th season

== Schedule and results ==
Legend
Oklahoma win
Oklahoma loss

1972 Oklahoma Sooners baseball game log
Regular season

March
Date	Opponent	Site/Stadium	Score	Overall Record	Big 8 Record
Mar 3	at Texas*	Clark Field • Austin, TX	L 6–13	0–1	
Mar 3	at Texas*	Clark Field • Austin, TX	W 5–1	1–1	
Mar 4	at Texas*	Clark Field • Austin, TX	L 1–10	1–2	
Mar 4	at Texas*	Clark Field • Austin, TX	L 1–2	1–3	
Mar 7	Texas–Arlington*	Haskell Park • Norman, OK	W 9–3	2–3	
Mar 7	Texas–Arlington*	Haskell Park • Norman, OK	W 6–1	3–3	
Mar 11	at SMU*	Armstrong Field • Dallas, TX	W 3–2	4–3	
Mar 11	at SMU*	Armstrong Field • Dallas, TX	W 6–0	5–3	
Mar 14	Friends*	Haskell Park • Norman, OK	W 7–4	6–3	
Mar 14	Friends*	Haskell Park • Norman, OK	W 8–6	7–3	
Mar 18	Oral Roberts*	Haskell Park • Norman, OK	W 5–0	8–3	
Mar 18	Oral Roberts*	Haskell Park • Norman, OK	W 4–2	9–3	
Mar 18	Oral Roberts*	Haskell Park • Norman, OK	W 3–0	10–3	
Mar 20	at Southern*	Baton Rouge, LA	L 0–18	10–4	
Mar 20	at LSU*	Alex Box Stadium • Baton Rouge, LA	L 1–9	10–5	
Mar 20	at LSU*	Alex Box Stadium • Baton Rouge, LA	W 9–1	11–5	
Mar 23	at LSU*	Alex Box Stadium • Baton Rouge, LA	L 0–1	11–6	
Mar 23	at LSU*	Alex Box Stadium • Baton Rouge, LA	W 3–1	12–6	
Mar 25	at LSU New Orleans*	New Orleans, LA	W 2–0	13–6	
Mar 25	at Tulane*	Tulane Diamond • New Orleans, LA	L 2–4	13–7	
Mar 25	at Tulane*	Tulane Diamond • New Orleans, LA	W 5–2	14–7	
Mar 31	Colorado	Haskell Park • Norman, OK	W 10–4	15–7	1–0

April
Date	Opponent	Site/Stadium	Score	Overall Record	Big 8 Record
Apr 1	Colorado	Haskell Park • Norman, OK	W 8–3	16–7	2–0
Apr 1	Colorado	Haskell Park • Norman, OK	L 1–11	16–8	2–1
Apr 7	at Kansas State	KSU Baseball Stadium • Manhattan, KS	W 6–2	17–8	3–1
Apr 7	at Kansas State	KSU Baseball Stadium • Manhattan, KS	W 6–4	18–8	4–1
Apr 8	at Kansas State	KSU Baseball Stadium • Manhattan, KS	W 12–6	19–8	5–1
Apr 14	Iowa State	Haskell Park • Norman, OK	L 1–4	19–9	5–2
Apr 16	Iowa State	Haskell Park • Norman, OK	W 9–1	20–9	6–2
Apr 16	Iowa State	Haskell Park • Norman, OK	W 12–2	21–9	7–2
Apr 18	Dallas Crusaders*	Haskell Park • Norman, OK	W 13–0	22–9	
Apr 18	Dallas*	Haskell Park • Norman, OK	W 6–0	23–9	
Apr 21	at Oklahoma State	Stillwater, OK	L 4–7	23–10	7–3
Apr 21	at Oklahoma State	Stillwater, OK	W 6–0	24–10	8–3
Apr 22	at Oklahoma State	Stillwater, OK	L 11–12	24–11	8–4
Apr 24	Oklahoma City*	Haskell Park • Norman, OK	W 15–1	25–11	
Apr 24	Oklahoma City*	Haskell Park • Norman, OK	W 4–2	26–11	
Apr 28	Kansas	Haskell Park • Norman, OK	W 2–0	27–11	9–4
Apr 28	Kansas	Haskell Park • Norman, OK	W 1–0	28–11	10–4
Apr 29	Kansas	Haskell Park • Norman, OK	L 0–2	28–12	10–5

May
Date	Opponent	Site/Stadium	Score	Overall Record	Big 8 Record
May 2	Arkansas*	Haskell Park • Norman, OK	W 3–2	29–12	
May 2	Arkansas*	Haskell Park • Norman, OK	W 4–3	30–12	
May 5	at Nebraska	Nebraska Diamond • Lincoln, NE	L 5–9	30–13	10–6
May 5	at Nebraska	Nebraska Diamond • Lincoln, NE	L 0–2	30–14	10–7
May 15	at Missouri	Simmons Field • Columbia, MO	W 5–2	31–14	11–7
May 15	at Missouri	Simmons Field • Columbia, MO	W 4–2	32–14	12–7
May 16	at Missouri	Simmons Field • Columbia, MO	L 3–7	32–15	12–8

Postseason

NCAA District 5
Date	Opponent	Site/Stadium	Score	Overall Record	NCAAT Record
May 27	at Tulsa	Tulsa, OK	W 6–3	33–15	1–0
May 28	at Tulsa	Tulsa, OK	W 5–4	34–15	2–0

May
Date	Opponent	Site/Stadium	Score	Overall Record
May 28	Lawton Pepsis	Tulsa, OK	W 9–2	exh
May 28	Lawton Pepsis	Tulsa, OK	W 6–0	exh
May 28	Liberal BeeJays	Tulsa, OK	W 14–10	exh
May 28	Liberal BeeJays	Tulsa, OK	L 3–10	exh

College World Series
Date	Opponent	Site/Stadium	Score	Overall Record	CWS Record
June 10	Temple	Johnny Rosenblatt Stadium • Omaha, NE	W 2–1^{13}	35–15	1–0
June 11	Arizona State	Johnny Rosenblatt Stadium • Omaha, NE	L 0–1	35–16	1–1
June 12	Texas	Johnny Rosenblatt Stadium • Omaha, NE	L 1–7	35–17	1–2
