= 1972 Iowa Hawkeyes baseball team =

American college baseball season

1972 Iowa Hawkeyes baseball

Big Ten Conference

College World Series, T-7th
- Conference: Big Ten Conference

Ranking
- Coaches: No. 7
- CB: No. 7
- Record: 25–17 (13–3 Big Ten)
- Head coach: Duane Banks (3rd season)

1972 Big Ten Conference baseball standings
	Conf.						Overall
Team	W		L		T	PCT	W		L		T	PCT
No. 7 Iowa ‍†‍‍^{y}	13	–	3	–	0	.813	25	–	17	–	0	.595
No. 22 Michigan State ‍‍‍	10	–	4	–	0	.714	28	–	10	–	0	.737
Michigan ‍‍‍	9	–	5	–	0	.643	18	–	13	–	1	.578
Minnesota ‍‍‍	9	–	5	–	0	.643	15	–	13	–	0	.536
Northwestern ‍‍‍	10	–	8	–	0	.556	17	–	14	–	0	.548
Wisconsin ‍‍‍	7	–	8	–	0	.467	20	–	22	–	0	.476
Ohio State ‍‍‍	6	–	10	–	0	.375	11	–	25	–	0	.306
Illinois ‍‍‍	5	–	9	–	0	.357	16	–	21	–	0	.432
Purdue ‍‍‍	3	–	9	–	0	.250	11	–	18	–	0	.379
Indiana ‍‍‍	2	–	13	–	0	.133	11	–	24	–	0	.314
† – Conference champion y – Invited to the NCAA tournament As of June 30, 1972; Rankings from Collegiate Baseball

The 1972 Iowa Hawkeyes baseball team represented the University of Iowa in the 1972 NCAA University Division baseball season. The head coach was Duane Banks, serving his 3rd year. The Hawkeyes finished the season in 7th place in the 1972 College World Series.

== Roster ==
1972 Iowa Hawkeyes baseball team
Players
Coaches

#	Pos.	Name	B/T	Height	Weight	Year	Home town
		Dave Blazin	/	—	—
		Dan Daiziel	/	—	—
		Tom DeAngelo	/	—	—
		Jeff Elgin	/	—	—
		Robert Elliott	/	—	—
	RHP	Mark Ewell	R/R	6 ft 5 in (1.96 m)	210 lb (95 kg)		Darby, Pennsylvania
		Tom Halleckson	/	—	—
		John Hartnett	/	—	—
	P	Bill Heckroth	/	—	—
		Tom Hilinski	/	—	—
	INF	Tom Hurn	/	—	—
		Mike Kielkopf	/	—	—
		Jimmy Lynn	/	—	—
		Neil Mandsager	/	—	—
		Dave Marshall	/	—	—
	OF	Fred Mims	R/R	6 ft 1 in (1.85 m)	190 lb (86 kg)		Garland, Alabama
		Charles Raymond	/	—	—
		Chet Teklinski	/	—	—
	INF	Brad Trickey	R/R	5 ft 10 in (1.78 m)	175 lb (79 kg)		Marshalltown, Iowa
	RHP	Mark Tschopp	R/R	6 ft 4 in (1.93 m)	194 lb (88 kg)		Cedar Rapids, Iowa
	OF	Larry Schutzius	/	—	—
		Jim Seiffert	/	—	—
		Ray Smith	/	—	—
	C	Jim Sundberg	R/R	6 ft 0 in (1.83 m)	190 lb (86 kg)		Galesburg, Illinois
	RHP	Jim Wise	R/R	6 ft 4 in (1.93 m)	190 lb (86 kg)
		Dave Wooldrik	/	—	—

Head coach

Duane Banks

Assistant coach(es)

Legend

- (C) Team captain
- (S) Suspended
- (I) Ineligible
- Injured
- Current redshirt

== Schedule ==
1972 Iowa Hawkeyes baseball game log
Regular season
March (3–4)

#	Date	Opponent	Site/stadium	Score	Overall record	Big Ten record
1	March 25	vs Grand Canyon	Unknown • Sun City, Arizona	11–5	1–0	0–0
2	March 25	vs Wyoming	Unknown • Sun City, Arizona	4–5	1–1	0–0
3	March 27	at Arizona	Sancet Stadium • Tucson, Arizona	1–10	1–2	0–0
4	March 28	at Arizona	Sancet Stadium • Tucson, Arizona	2–9	2–2	0–0
5	March 29	at Arizona	Sancet Stadium • Tucson, Arizona	6–7	2–3	0–0
6	March 30	at Arizona	Sancet Stadium • Tucson, Arizona	13–22	2–4	0–0
7	March 31	at Northern Arizona	Unknown • Flagstaff, Arizona	10–8	3–4	0–0

April (12–8)

#	Date	Opponent	Site/stadium	Score	Overall record	Big Ten record
8	April 1	Drake	Unknown • Iowa City, Iowa	19–1	4–4	0–0
9	April 1	Drake	Unknown • Iowa City, Iowa	3–1	5–4	0–0
10	April	Cornell	Unknown • Iowa City, Iowa	4–0	6–4	0–0
11	April	Cornell	Unknown • Iowa City, Iowa	7–2	7–4	0–0
12	April	vs Iowa State	Unknown • Unknown	1–3	7–5	0–0
13	April	vs Iowa State	Unknown • Unknown	0–1	7–6	0–0
14	April 14	at Ohio State	Trautman Field • Columbus, Ohio	2–3	7–7	0–1
15	April 14	at Ohio State	Trautman Field • Columbus, Ohio	9–3	8–7	1–1
16	April 15	at Indiana	Sembower Field • Bloomington, Indiana	7–3	9–7	2–1
17	April 15	at Indiana	Sembower Field • Bloomington, Indiana	1–2	9–8	2–2
18	April	vs Northern Iowa	Unknown • Unknown, Iowa	1–8	9–9	2–2
19	April	vs Northern Iowa	Unknown • Unknown, Iowa	10–5	10–9	2–2
20	April 22	at Michigan	Ray Fisher Stadium • Ann Arbor, Michigan	3–9	10–10	2–3
21	April 22	at Michigan	Ray Fisher Stadium • Ann Arbor, Michigan	1–0	11–10	3–3
22	April 25	vs Creighton	Unknown • Unknown	4–5	11–11	3–3
23	April 25	vs Creighton	Unknown • Unknown	6–9	11–12	3–3
24	April 28	Illinois	Unknown • Iowa City, Iowa	5–4	12–12	4–3
25	April 28	Illinois	Unknown • Iowa City, Iowa	3–0	13–12	5–3
26	April 30	at Purdue	Lambert Field • West Lafayette, Indiana	4–0	14–12	6–3
27	April 30	at Purdue	Lambert Field • West Lafayette, Indiana	12–1	15–12	7–3

May (6–2)

#	Date	Opponent	Site/stadium	Score	Overall record	Big Ten record
28	May	vs Minnesota	Unknown • Unknown	3–2	16–12	8–3
29	May	vs Minnesota	Unknown • Unknown	6–2	17–12	9–3
30	May	vs Wisconsin	Unknown • Unknown	10–2	18–12	10–3
31	May	vs Wisconsin	Unknown • Unknown	4–0	19–12	11–3
32	May	vs Northwestern	Unknown • Unknown	6–1	19–12	12–3
33	May	vs Northwestern	Unknown • Unknown	10–8	20–12	13–3
34	May	vs Western Michigan	Unknown • Unknown	3–4	20–13	13–3
35	May	vs Western Michigan	Unknown • Unknown	4–5	20–14	13–3

Postseason
District 4 Tournament (4–1)

#	Date	Opponent	Site/stadium	Score	Overall record	Big Ten record
36	May	Central Michigan	Steller Field • Bowling Green, Ohio	2–7	20–15	13–3
37	May	Northern Illinois	Steller Field • Bowling Green, Ohio	8–1	21–15	13–3
38	May	Central Michigan	Steller Field • Bowling Green, Ohio	4–3	22–15	13–3
39	May	at Bowling Green	Steller Field • Bowling Green, Ohio	4–2	23–15	13–3
40	May	at Bowling Green	Steller Field • Bowling Green, Ohio	7–5	24–15	13–3

1972 College World Series (0–2)

#	Date	Opponent	Site/stadium	Score	Overall record	Big Ten record
41	June 10	vs Arizona State	Omaha Municipal Stadium • Omaha, Nebraska	1–2	24–16	13–3
42	June 10	vs Temple	Omaha Municipal Stadium • Omaha, Nebraska	9–13	24–17	13–3
