= Skip Wilson Field =

Baseball stadium in Pennsylvania, USA

- Location within Pennsylvania Location within the United States
- Interactive map of Skip Wilson Field
- Full name: James “Skip” Wilson Field (2006–present)
- Former names: Ambler Field (2004-2006)
- Location: 580 Meetinghouse Road; Ambler, Pennsylvania, USA
- Coordinates: 40.165462°N 75.197296°W
- Owner: Temple University
- Operator: Temple University
- Capacity: 1,000
- Surface: Natural grass
- Field size: Left Field: 330 feet (101 m); Center Field: 400 feet (122 m); Right Field: 330 feet (101 m)

Construction
- Opened: March 25, 2004; May 15, 2004 (Dedication)

Tenants
- Temple University (NCAA D-I) 2004–2014; Arcadia University (NCAA D-III) 2018–present

Skip Wilson Field is a baseball stadium in Ambler, Pennsylvania. It is the home field of the Arcadia University baseball team which moved to the ballfield in 2018.

== Temple University ==
It was the home field of the Temple Owls baseball team until the end of the 2014 season, when the school cut the program. The stadium holds 1,000 spectators and opened in 2004. It is named after former Owls baseball coach James "Skip" Wilson.

Temple played their first game at the field on March 25, 2004, and beat University of the Sciences 6–2. Four other projected home openers had been canceled due to either bad weather or poor field conditions.

The field was originally called Temple's Ambler Field in reference to its location at Temple's Ambler campus. The university began to refer to the ball-field as Skip Wilson Field in 2006. On April 28, 2007, Temple University-Ambler celebrated “Skip Wilson Day" when the university officially dedicated Skip Wilson Field at Ambler in honor of the coach.

Prior to Skip Wilson Field, Temple baseball played its home games at Erny Field at Mount Pleasant Avenue and Michener Street in the West Oak Lane section of Philadelphia.

== See also ==
- List of NCAA Division I baseball venues
