= 1972 Ole Miss Rebels baseball team =

American college baseball season

1972 Ole Miss Rebels baseball

SEC Western Division champion SEC Champion District III champion

College World Series, T-5th
- Conference: Southeastern Conference
- Western
- CB: No. 8
- Record: 28–16 (15–3 SEC)
- Head coach: Jake Gibbs (1st season)
- Home stadium: Swayze Field

1972 Southeastern Conference baseball standings
	Conf.						Overall
Team	W		L		T	PCT	W		L		T	PCT
Eastern Division
No. 28 Vanderbilt ^{x}‍‍‍^{y}	13	–	3	–	0	.813	35	–	15	–	1	.696
Tennessee ‍‍‍	7	–	6	–	0	.538	19	–	14	–	0	.576
Auburn ‍‍‍	7	–	6	–	0	.538	18	–	17	–	0	.514
Florida ‍‍‍	7	–	7	–	0	.500	23	–	21	–	0	.523
Kentucky ‍‍‍	4	–	8	–	0	.333	16	–	10	–	1	.611
Georgia ‍‍‍	4	–	12	–	0	.250	12	–	22	–	0	.353
Western Division
No. 8 Ole Miss ^{x}‍‍‡‍^{y}	15	–	3	–	0	.833	28	–	16	–	0	.636
Alabama ‍‍‍	7	–	11	–	0	.389	21	–	14	–	1	.597
Mississippi State ‍‍‍	7	–	11	–	0	.389	24	–	16	–	0	.600
LSU ‍‍‍	7	–	11	–	0	.389	21	–	21	–	0	.500
x – Division champion ‡ – Tournament champion y – Invited to the NCAA tournament As of June 30, 1972; Rankings from Collegiate Baseball

The 1972 Ole Miss Rebels baseball team represented the University of Mississippi in the 1972 NCAA University Division baseball season. The Rebels played their home games at Swayze Field. The team was coached by Jake Gibbs in his 1st year as head coach at Ole Miss.

The Rebels won the District III Playoff to advance to the College World Series, where they were defeated by the Texas Longhorns. They would not make it to the College World Series again until 2014.

== Roster ==
1972 Ole Miss Rebels baseball team
Players
Coaches

#	Pos.	Name	B/T	Height	Weight	Year	Home town
		Larry Anthony	/	—	—
		Bobby Berry	/	—	—
	INF	Steve Dillard	R/R	6 ft 1 in (1.85 m)	180 lb (82 kg)	Sr	Saltillo, Mississippi
		Don Farrar	/	—	—
	P	Barry Gaddis	/	—	—
	OF	Paul Husband	R/R	6 ft 2 in (1.88 m)	185 lb (84 kg)		Jackson, Mississippi
		Bob Knight	/	—	—
		Hank List	/	—	—
		Dan McLeod	/	—	—
		Hugh McLeod	/	—	—
		Kevin McMahon	/	—	—
		Byron Meaut	/	—	—
		Jamie Morris	/	—	—
		Herb Nappier	/	—	—
		Joe Nichols	/	—	—
	RHP	Mike Park	R/R	5 ft 10 in (1.78 m)	170 lb (77 kg)	Fr
	P	Jim Pittman	/	—	—	So
		Bill Rogers	/	—	—
		Rodney Siedell	/	—	—
		Bobby Spaulding	/	—	—
	C	Dennis Starr	R/R	6 ft 0 in (1.83 m)	185 lb (84 kg)		Memphis, Tennessee
		Glenn Terry	/	—	—	Fr
	OF	Norris Weese	/	—	—	Sr
		Practice Team Players:	/	—	—
		Lynn Tramel	/	—	—
		Kent Doyle	/	—	—
		Brant Beene	/	—	—
		Frank D'Orsie	/	—	—
		Danny Gaither	/	—	—
		Jimmy Sanders	/	—	—

Head coach

Jake Gibbs

Assistant coach(es)

Larry Williams

Legend

- (C) Team captain
- (S) Suspended
- (I) Ineligible
- Injured
- Current redshirt

Roster
Last update: April 8, 2021

== Schedule ==
1972 Ole Miss Rebels baseball game log
Regular season
March (7–6)

#	Date	Opponent	Site/stadium	Score	Overall record	SEC record
1	March 10	Kansas State	Swayze Field • Oxford, Mississippi	8–7	1–0	–
2	March 10	Kansas State	Swayze Field • Oxford, Mississippi	10–5	2–0	–
3	March 11	Kansas State	Swayze Field • Oxford, Mississippi	1–8	2–1	–
4	March 11	Kansas State	Swayze Field • Oxford, Mississippi	7–10	2–2	–
5	March 17	at Southern Mississippi	Unknown • Hattiesburg, Mississippi	9–1	3–2	–
6	March 18	at Southern Mississippi	Unknown • Hattiesburg, Mississippi	3–2	4–2	–
7	March 19	at South Alabama	Eddie Stanky Field • Mobile, Alabama	1–7	4–3	–
8	March 19	at South Alabama	Eddie Stanky Field • Mobile, Alabama	0–6	4–4	–
9	March 20	at South Alabama	Eddie Stanky Field • Mobile, Alabama	4–8	4–5	–
10	March 24	Southern Mississippi	Swayze Field • Oxford, Mississippi	4–3	5–5	–
11	March 24	Southern Mississippi	Swayze Field • Oxford, Mississippi	0–3	5–6	–
12	March 31	LSU	Swayze Field • Oxford, Mississippi	2–1	6–6	1–0
13	March 31	LSU	Swayze Field • Oxford, Mississippi	5–2	7–6	2–0

Postseason
April (13–4)

#	Date	Opponent	Site/stadium	Score	Overall record	SEC record
14	April 1	LSU	Swayze Field • Oxford, Mississippi	3–2	8–6	3–0
15	April 7	Alabama	Swayze Field • Oxford, Mississippi	7–6	9–6	4–0
16	April 7	Alabama	Swayze Field • Oxford, Mississippi	8–1	10–6	5–0
17	April 8	Alabama	Swayze Field • Oxford, Mississippi	1–2	10–7	5–1
18	April 14	Mississippi State	Swayze Field • Oxford, Mississippi	4–2	11–7	6–1
19	April 14	Mississippi State	Swayze Field • Oxford, Mississippi	5–3	12–7	7–1
20	April 15	Mississippi State	Swayze Field • Oxford, Mississippi	5–3	13–7	8–1
21	April 17	Memphis State	Swayze Field • Oxford, Mississippi	4–3	14–7	8–1
22	April 19	at Memphis State	Nat Buring Stadium • Memphis, Tennessee	8–14	14–8	8–1
23	April 21	at Alabama	Sewell–Thomas Stadium • Tuscaloosa, Alabama	3–1	15–8	9–1
24	April 21	at Alabama	Sewell–Thomas Stadium • Tuscaloosa, Alabama	5–3	16–8	10–1
25	April 22	at Alabama	Sewell–Thomas Stadium • Tuscaloosa, Alabama	13–6	17–8	11–1
26	April 24	Memphis State	Swayze Field • Oxford, Mississippi	7–8	17–9	11–1
27	April 25	at Memphis State	Nat Buring Stadium • Memphis, Tennessee	7–8	17–10	11–1
28	April 28	Mississippi State	Swayze Field • Oxford, Mississippi	2–1	18–10	12–1
29	April 28	Mississippi State	Swayze Field • Oxford, Mississippi	3–2	19–10	13–1
30	April 29	Mississippi State	Swayze Field • Oxford, Mississippi	3–2	20–10	14–1

May (2–2)

#	Date	Opponent	Site/stadium	Score	Overall record	SEC record
31	May 1	at Delta State	Unknown • Cleveland, Mississippi	1–4	21–10	14–1
32	May 5	at LSU	Alex Box Stadium • Baton Rouge, Louisiana	3–4	21–11	14–2
33	May 5	at LSU	Alex Box Stadium • Baton Rouge, Louisiana	7–4	22–11	15–3
34	May 6	at LSU	Alex Box Stadium • Baton Rouge, Louisiana	3–7	22–12	15–3

Postseason
SEC Conference Championship (2–0)

#	Date	Opponent	Site/stadium	Score	Overall record	SEC record
35	May 10	at Vanderbilt	McGugin Field • Nashville, Tennessee	5–3	23–12	15–3
36	May 13	Vanderbilt	Sawyze Field • Oxford, Mississippi	5–4	24–12	15–3

NCAA District III Playoff (5–1)

#	Date	Opponent	Site/stadium	Score	Overall record	SEC record
37	June	vs Jacksonville	Sims Legion Park • Gastonia, North Carolina	9–3	25–12	15–3
38	June 2	vs Virginia	Sims Legion Park • Gastonia, North Carolina	3–9	25–13	15–3
39	June	vs Florida State	Sims Legion Park • Gastonia, North Carolina	8–3	26–13	15–3
40	June	vs Virginia	Sims Legion Park • Gastonia, North Carolina	9–0	27–13	15–3
41	June	vs South Alabama	Sims Legion Park • Gastonia, North Carolina	8–4	28–13	15–3
42	June	vs South Alabama	Sims Legion Park • Gastonia, North Carolina	12–1	29–13	15–3

College World Series (0–2)

#	Date	Opponent	Site/stadium	Score	Overall record	SEC record
43	June 9	vs Southern California	Johnny Rosenblatt Stadium • Omaha, Nebraska	6–8	29–14	15–3
44	June 10	vs Texas	Johnny Rosenblatt Stadium • Omaha, Nebraska	8–9	29–15	15–3

== Awards and honors ==
Steve Dillard

- All-SEC
- All-SEC Western Division
- Third Team All-American American Baseball Coaches Association
- All District III

Barry Gaddis

- All-SEC Western Division

Paul Husband

- All-SEC
- All-SEC Western Division
- First Team All-American American Baseball Coaches Association
- First Team All-American Worth
- All District III

Jim Pittman

- All-SEC

Dennis Starr

- All-SEC Western Division

Norris Weese

- All-SEC Western Division
