= 1972 NCAA University Division baseball season =

Baseball season

- Number of teams: 211

NCAA tournament

College World Series
- Champions: Southern California (8th title)
- Runners-up: Arizona State (5th CWS Appearance)
- Winning coach: Rod Dedeaux (8th title)
- MOP: Russ McQueen (Southern California)

Seasons
- ← 1971 1973 →

The 1972 NCAA University Division baseball season, play of college baseball in the United States organized by the National Collegiate Athletic Association (NCAA) began in the spring of 1972. The season progressed through the regular season and concluded with the 1972 College World Series. The College World Series, held for the 26th time in 1972, consisted of one team from each of eight geographical districts and was held in Omaha, Nebraska at Johnny Rosenblatt Stadium as a double-elimination tournament. Southern California claimed the championship for the third year in a row, en route to five consecutive titles.

== Conference winners ==
This is a partial list of conference champions from the 1972 season. Each of the eight geographical districts chose, by various methods, the team that would represent them in the NCAA tournament. 13 teams earned automatic bids by winning their conference championship while 15 teams earned at-large selections.

Conference	Regular season winner	Conference Tournament	Tournament Venue • City	Tournament Winner
Atlantic Coast Conference	Virginia	No tournament		
Big Eight Conference	Oklahoma	No tournament		
Big Ten Conference	Iowa	No tournament		
EIBL	Cornell; Harvard	No tournament		
Mid-American Conference	Bowling Green	No tournament		
Pacific-8 Conference	North - Washington State/Oregon; South - Southern California	No tournament		
Southeastern Conference	Ole Miss	No tournament		
Southern Conference	Richmond	No tournament		
Southwest Conference	Texas; TCU	No tournament		
Western Athletic Conference	North - BYU; South - Arizona State	1973 Western Athletic Conference Baseball Championship Series	Provo, UT	Arizona State
Yankee Conference	Connecticut	No tournament		

== Conference standings ==
The following is an incomplete list of conference standings:

1972 Big Eight Conference baseball standings
	Conf.				Overall
Team	W		L	PCT	W		L	PCT
No. 5 Oklahoma ‍†‍‍^{y}	12	–	8	.600	35	–	17	.673
Colorado ‍‍‍	10	–	8	.556	22	–	18	.550
Kansas ‍‍‍	11	–	9	.550	20	–	10	.667
Kansas State ‍‍‍	9	–	9	.500	17	–	17	.500
Oklahoma State ‍‍‍	10	–	10	.500	15	–	17	.469
Missouri ‍‍‍	9	–	11	.450	16	–	16	.500
Nebraska ‍‍‍	8	–	11	.421	12	–	17	.414
Iowa State ‍‍‍	7	–	10	.412	13	–	18	.419
† – Conference champion y – Invited to the NCAA tournament As of June 30, 1972; Rankings from Collegiate Baseball

1972 Big Ten Conference baseball standings
	Conf.						Overall
Team	W		L		T	PCT	W		L		T	PCT
No. 7 Iowa ‍†‍‍^{y}	13	–	3	–	0	.813	25	–	17	–	0	.595
No. 22 Michigan State ‍‍‍	10	–	4	–	0	.714	28	–	10	–	0	.737
Michigan ‍‍‍	9	–	5	–	0	.643	18	–	13	–	1	.578
Minnesota ‍‍‍	9	–	5	–	0	.643	15	–	13	–	0	.536
Northwestern ‍‍‍	10	–	8	–	0	.556	17	–	14	–	0	.548
Wisconsin ‍‍‍	7	–	8	–	0	.467	20	–	22	–	0	.476
Ohio State ‍‍‍	6	–	10	–	0	.375	11	–	25	–	0	.306
Illinois ‍‍‍	5	–	9	–	0	.357	16	–	21	–	0	.432
Purdue ‍‍‍	3	–	9	–	0	.250	11	–	18	–	0	.379
Indiana ‍‍‍	2	–	13	–	0	.133	11	–	24	–	0	.314
† – Conference champion y – Invited to the NCAA tournament As of June 30, 1972; Rankings from Collegiate Baseball

1972 Pacific-8 Conference baseball standings
	Conf.				Overall
Team	W		L	PCT	W		L	PCT
Northern Division
No. 25 Washington State ^{x}‍‍‍	14	–	4	.778	29	–	13	.690
Oregon ‍‍‍	14	–	4	.778		–		–
Washington ‍‍‍	5	–	12	.294	13	–	18	.419
Oregon State ‍‍‍	2	–	15	.118	13	–	24	.351
Southern Division
No. 1 Southern California ^{x}‍‍‍^{y}	14	–	4	.778	46	–	11	.807
No. 30 California ‍‍‍	9	–	9	.500	33	–	21	.611
No. 12 Stanford ‍‍‍	9	–	9	.500	37	–	17	.685
UCLA ‍‍‍	4	–	14	.222	32	–	33	.492
† – Conference champion y – Invited to the NCAA tournament As of June 30, 1972; Rankings from Collegiate Baseball

1972 Southeastern Conference baseball standings
	Conf.						Overall
Team	W		L		T	PCT	W		L		T	PCT
Eastern Division
No. 28 Vanderbilt ^{x}‍‍‍^{y}	13	–	3	–	0	.813	35	–	15	–	1	.696
Tennessee ‍‍‍	7	–	6	–	0	.538	19	–	14	–	0	.576
Auburn ‍‍‍	7	–	6	–	0	.538	18	–	17	–	0	.514
Florida ‍‍‍	7	–	7	–	0	.500	23	–	21	–	0	.523
Kentucky ‍‍‍	4	–	8	–	0	.333	16	–	10	–	1	.611
Georgia ‍‍‍	4	–	12	–	0	.250	12	–	22	–	0	.353
Western Division
No. 8 Ole Miss ^{x}‍‍‡‍^{y}	15	–	3	–	0	.833	28	–	16	–	0	.636
Alabama ‍‍‍	7	–	11	–	0	.389	21	–	14	–	1	.597
Mississippi State ‍‍‍	7	–	11	–	0	.389	24	–	16	–	0	.600
LSU ‍‍‍	7	–	11	–	0	.389	21	–	21	–	0	.500
x – Division champion ‡ – Tournament champion y – Invited to the NCAA tournament As of June 30, 1972; Rankings from Collegiate Baseball

1972 Southern Conference baseball standings
	Conf.				Overall
Team	W		L	PCT	W		L	PCT
Richmond ‍†‍‍^{y}	8	–	5	.615	16	–	8	.667
East Carolina ‍‍‍	10	–	4	.714	16	–	8	.667
Furman ‍‍‍	6	–	6	.500	16	–	15	.516
The Citadel ‍‍‍	8	–	5	.615	16	–	8	.667
Appalachian State ‍‍‍	11	–	3	.786	14	–	10	.583
William & Mary ‍‍‍	5	–	6	.455	11	–	15	.423
Davidson ‍‍‍	1	–	10	.091	8	–	15	.348
VMI ‍‍‍	0	–	10	.000	3	–	14	.176
y – Invited to the NCAA tournament As of June 30, 1972; Rankings from Collegiate Baseball

1972 Southwest Conference baseball standings
	Conf.				Overall
Team	W		L	PCT	W		L	PCT
No. 4 Texas ‍†‍‍^{y}	12	–	6	.667	50	–	9	.847
No. 27 TCU ‍†‍‍	12	–	6	.667	29	–	13	.690
Rice ‍‍‍	11	–	7	.611	19	–	12	.613
Texas A&M ‍‍‍	10	–	8	.556	27	–	11	.711
SMU ‍‍‍	6	–	12	.333	22	–	30	.423
Texas Tech ‍‍‍	6	–	12	.333	23	–	19	.548
Baylor ‍‍‍	6	–	12	.333	20	–	20	.500
† – Conference champion y – Invited to the NCAA tournament As of June 30, 1972; Rankings from Collegiate Baseball

1972 Western Athletic Conference baseball standings
	Conf.				Overall
Team	W		L	PCT	W		L	PCT
Northern
BYU ^{x}‍‍‍	12	–	6	.667	59	–	8	.881
Colorado State ‍‍‍	12	–	6	.667	20	–	20	.500
Wyoming ‍‍‍	8	–	10	.444	18	–	29	.383
Utah ‍‍‍	4	–	14	.222	21	–	28	.429
Southern
No. 2 Arizona State ^{x‡y} ‍‍‍	18	–	0	1.000	64	–	6	.914
Arizona ‍‍‍	9	–	9	.500	38	–	20	.655
New Mexico ‍‍‍	8	–	10	.444	29	–	14	.674
UTEP ‍‍‍	1	–	17	.056	12	–	39	.235
x – Division champion ‡ – Championship series champion y – Invited to the NCAA tournament As of June 30, 1972; Rankings from Collegiate Baseball

1972 Yankee Conference baseball standings
	Conf.				Overall
Team	W		L	PCT	W		L	PCT
No. 6 Connecticut ‍†‍‍^{y}	12	–	0	1.000	20	–	7	.741
Maine ‍‍‍	8	–	4	.667	20	–	7	.741
UMass ‍‍‍	8	–	4	.667	16	–	5	.762
New Hampshire ‍‍‍	6	–	6	.500	10	–	9	.526
Rhode Island ‍‍‍	5	–	7	.417	7	–	11	.389
Holy Cross ‍‍‍	3	–	9	.250	5	–	21	.192
Boston University ‍‍‍	0	–	12	.000	2	–	22	.083
† – Conference champion y – Invited to the NCAA tournament As of June 30, 1972; Rankings from Collegiate Baseball

== College World Series ==
The 1972 season marked the twenty sixth NCAA baseball tournament, which culminated with the eight team College World Series. The College World Series was held in Omaha, Nebraska. The eight teams played a double-elimination format, with Southern California claiming their eighth championship, and third in a row, with a 1–0 win over Arizona State in the final.

Upper round 1
Ole Miss	6
Southern California	8
Texas	0
Connecticut	3^{10}
Temple	1
Oklahoma	2^{13}
Iowa	1
Arizona State	2

Upper round 2
Southern California	5^{11}
Connecticut	4
Oklahoma	0
Arizona State	1
Lower round 1
Ole Miss	8
Texas	9
Temple	13
Iowa	9

Upper final
Southern California	0
Arizona State	3
Lower round 2
Texas	7
Oklahoma	1
Temple	7
Connecticut	4

Semifinals
Arizona State	1
Temple	0
Texas	3
Southern California	4^{10}

Final
Arizona State	1	0
Southern California	3	1
