= 1972 USC Trojans baseball team =

American college baseball season

1972 USC Trojans baseball

National champions Pacific-8 Conference champions
- Conference: Pacific-8 Conference
- CB: No. 1
- Record: 47–13–1 (14–4 Pac-8)
- Head coach: Rod Dedeaux (31st year)
- Home stadium: Bovard Field

1972 Pacific-8 Conference baseball standings
	Conf.				Overall
Team	W		L	PCT	W		L	PCT
Northern Division
No. 25 Washington State ^{x}‍‍‍	14	–	4	.778	29	–	13	.690
Oregon ‍‍‍	14	–	4	.778		–		–
Washington ‍‍‍	5	–	12	.294	13	–	18	.419
Oregon State ‍‍‍	2	–	15	.118	13	–	24	.351
Southern Division
No. 1 Southern California ^{x}‍‍‍^{y}	14	–	4	.778	46	–	11	.807
No. 30 California ‍‍‍	9	–	9	.500	33	–	21	.611
No. 12 Stanford ‍‍‍	9	–	9	.500	37	–	17	.685
UCLA ‍‍‍	4	–	14	.222	32	–	33	.492
† – Conference champion y – Invited to the NCAA tournament As of June 30, 1972; Rankings from Collegiate Baseball

The 1972 USC Trojans baseball team represented the University of Southern California in the 1972 NCAA University Division baseball season. The team was coached by Rod Dedeaux in his 31st season.

The Trojans won the College World Series, defeating the Arizona State Sun Devils in the championship game, winning their third of five consecutive national championships, and fourth in five years.

== Roster ==
1972 USC Trojans roster
Pitchers: Tim Coffin; Russ McQueen; Dan Olson; Jeff Reinke; Wayne Schrader; Randy Scarbery; Mark Sogge; Greg Widman	Infielders: Rob Adoplh; Daryl Arenstein; Ed Bowman; Terry Dedeaux; Milt Guggia; Jeff Port; Roy Smalley; Catchers: Sam Ceci; Vince Moll; Ed Putnam; Mike Swiderski	Outfielders: Craig Barnes; Anthony Davis; Ken Huizenga; Fred Lynn; Dan Olson; Jeff Pederson; James Steele; Creighton Tevlin; Coaches: Rod Dedeaux

== Schedule ==
1972 USC Trojans baseball game log
Regular season
February

Date	Opponent	Score	Overall record	Pac-8 record
February 18	UC Santa Barbara	4–5	0–1	–
February 22	Cal Poly Pomona	7–4	1–1	–
February 26	UC Santa Barbara	4–5	1–2	–
February 26	UC Santa Barbara	9–6	2–2	–
February 29	UC Irvine	2–0	3–2	–

March

Date	Opponent	Score	Overall record	Pac-8 record
March 1	Chapman	12–7	4–2	–
March 3	Loyola Marymount	5–10	4–3	–
March 7	Pepperdine	17–3	5–3	–
March 8	at Loyola Marymount	6–10	6–3	–
March 10	at Fresno State	8–5	7–3	–
March 11	at Fresno State	4–5	7–4	–
March 11	at Fresno State	12–4	8–4	–
March 14	San Fernando Valley State	9–8	9–4	–
March 15	at Long Beach State	6–0	10–4	–
March 17	San Diego State	4–2	11–4	–
March 18	San Diego State	8–4	12–4	–
March 18	San Diego State	6–2	13–4	–
March 22	at San Fernando Valley State	12–2	14–4	–
March 23	Gonzaga	10–2	15–4	–
March 24	at Arizona	2–6	15–5	–
March 25	at Arizona	5–3	16–5	–
March 25	at Arizona	2–1	17–5	–
March 30	vs. Washington State	12–10	18–5	–
March 31	at Hawaii	4–0	19–5	–

April

Date	Opponent	Score	Overall record	Pac-8 record
April 1	vs. BYU	6–0	20–5	–
April 4	New Mexico	4–2	21–5	–
April 7	Stanford	0–2	21–6	0–1
April 8	Stanford	1–2	21–7	0–2
April 8	Stanford	3–2	22–7	1–2
April 10	Cal Poly Pomona	5–6	22–8	–
April 11	Westmont	1–2	22–9	–
April 14	at California	11–5	23–9	2–2
April 15	at California	2–1	24–9	3–2
April 15	at California	7–6	25–9	4–2
April 21	UCLA	2–1	26–9	5–2
April 22	at UCLA	5–2	27–9	6–2
April 22	at UCLA	10–0	28–9	7–2
April 25	at Cal State Los Angeles	14–4	29–9	–
April 28	California	10–0	29–9–1	–
April 29	California	3–2	30–9–1	8–2
April 29	California	8–0	31–9–1	9–2
April 30	California	10–3	32–9–1	10–2

May

Date	Opponent	Score	Overall record	Pac-8 record
May 2	Cal State Los Angeles	4–0	33–9–1	–
May 3	at Chapman	8–14	33–10–1	–
May 5	at Stanford	4–3	34–10–1	11–2
May 6	at Stanford	4–3	34–10–1	11–3
May 6	at Stanford	10–7	35–11–1	12–3
May 9	Long Beach State	6–1	36–11–1	–
May 12	at UCLA	8–6	37–11–1	13–3
May 13	UCLA	9–2	38–11–1	14–3
May 13	UCLA	6–7	38–12–1	14–4

Postseason
NCAA tournament: Pacific-8 playoffs

Date	Opponent	Site/stadium	Score	Overall record
May 19	vs. Washington State	Bovard Field	6–1	39–12–1
May 20	vs. Washington State	Bovard Field	8–7	40–12–1

NCAA tournament: District 8 playoffs

Date	Opponent	Site/stadium	Score	Overall record
May 27	vs. UC Santa Barbara	Campus Diamond	9–5	41–12–1
May 28	vs. UC Santa Barbara	Campus Diamond	13–6	42–12–1

NCAA tournament: College World Series

Date	Opponent	Site/stadium	Score	Overall record
June 9	vs. Mississippi	Rosenblatt Stadium	8–6	43–12–1
June 11	vs. Connecticut	Rosenblatt Stadium	5–4	44–12–1
June 12	vs. Arizona State	Rosenblatt Stadium	0–3	44–13–1
June 14	vs. Texas	Rosenblatt Stadium	4–3	45–13–1
June 15	vs. Arizona State	Rosenblatt Stadium	3–1	46–13–1
June 16	vs. Arizona State	Rosenblatt Stadium	1–0	47–13–1

== Awards and honors ==
Daryl Arenstein

- College World Series All-Tournament Team

Same Ceci

- College World Series All-Tournament Team
- All-Pacific-8 First Team

Fred Lynn

- All-America First Team
- All-Pacific-8 First Team

Russ McQueen

- College World Series Most Outstanding Player

Roy Smalley

- All-Pacific-8 First Team

Tim Steele

- College World Series All-Tournament Team
- All-Pacific-8 First Team

Greg Widman

- All-Pacific-8 First Team

== Trojans in the 1972 MLB draft ==
The following members of the USC baseball program were drafted in the 1972 Major League Baseball draft.

=== January regular draft ===
Player	Position	Round	Overall	MLB Team
Eric Raich	RHP	1st	1st	Cleveland Indians
