= Jim Otten =

American baseball player (born 1951)

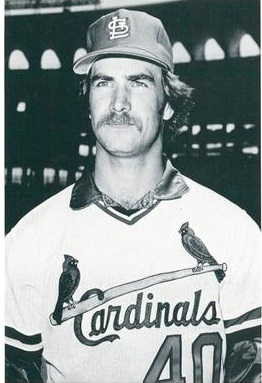
- Pitcher
- Born: July 1, 1951 (age 74); Lewistown, Montana, U.S.
- Batted: Right Threw: Right

MLB debut
- July 31, 1974, for the Chicago White Sox

Last MLB appearance
- September 30, 1981, for the St. Louis Cardinals

MLB statistics
- Win–loss record: 1–6
- Earned run average: 5.46
- Strikeouts: 75
- Stats at Baseball Reference

Teams
- Chicago White Sox (1974–1976); St. Louis Cardinals (1980–1981)

James Edward Otten (born July 1, 1951) is an American former professional baseball player, a right-handed pitcher who appeared in 64 games in Major League Baseball for the Chicago White Sox and the St. Louis Cardinals between 1974 and 1981. He went to Arizona State University, stood 6 feet 2 inches (1.88 m) tall and weighed 195 pounds (88 kg).

Otten was selected by the White Sox in the second round (45th overall) of the 1973 Major League Baseball draft. He was recalled in 1974, a season during which he posted a 13–5 record with the White Sox' two highest farm clubs. He worked in five games (four in relief) for the 1974 ChiSox, then briefly appeared in two games each as a reliever for the 1975–1976 White Sox during subsequent recalls from the minors. After spending all of 1977 at Triple-A, he was traded that December to the Cardinals' organization.

The Cardinals promoted him from their top affiliate, the Springfield Redbirds, in May 1980 and he worked in 55 games for St. Louis during the next two seasons. He earned his only MLB victory on May 14, 1981, when he pitched a scoreless eighth inning of relief against the Houston Astros. When he entered the game, the Cardinals trailed 6–3, but in the top of the ninth inning, they rallied for four runs to take the lead, and Baseball Hall of Fame closer Bruce Sutter nailed down the save for a 7–6 St. Louis triumph.

As a Major Leaguer, Otten allowed 150 hits and 67 bases on balls in 118 2/3 innings pitched, with 75 strikeouts. Of his 64 appearances, all but five came in relief.
