= Craig Swan =

American baseball player (born 1950)

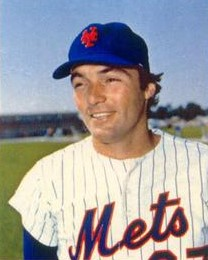
- Pitcher
- Born: November 30, 1950 (age 75); Van Nuys, California, U.S.
- Batted: Right Threw: Right

MLB debut
- September 3, 1973, for the New York Mets

Last MLB appearance
- May 29, 1984, for the California Angels

MLB statistics
- Win–loss record: 59–72
- Earned run average: 3.74
- Strikeouts: 673
- Stats at Baseball Reference

Teams
- New York Mets (1973–1984); California Angels (1984)

Career highlights and awards
- NL ERA leader (1978)

Craig Steven Swan (born November 30, 1950) is an American former professional baseball pitcher who played in Major League Baseball from 1973 to 1984 for the New York Mets and California Angels. Swan's best season came in 1978 when he posted a 9–6 win–loss record and led the National League with an earned run average of 2.43. This was significant as the Mets were in the National League East cellar that year. Swan featured a fastball between 90 and 95 miles per hour with good movement and an occasional slider.

== Early life and career ==
Swan was born in Van Nuys, California. At age 14, he pitched for Long Beach in the PONY League, hurled a no-hitter, and was invited to throw out the ceremonial first pitch at Dodger Stadium before Game 5 of the 1965 World Series; his pitch was televised and can be seen on the TV broadcast, with announcer Ray Scott describing his pitching exploits. At age 17, was picked in the 23rd round of the 1968 Major League Baseball draft by the St. Louis Cardinals. Rather than sign as a low-round pick, Swan attended Arizona State University. In the 1972 College World Series, Swan allowed only one run in 18 innings pitched for a 0.50 ERA – tied for the best ever for 18 or more innings. For his efforts, he was named to the All-Tournament Team but Arizona State lost to the University of Southern California in the championship game.

Swan was chosen by the Mets in the third round of the 1972 Major League Baseball draft. He spent most of 1972 to 1975 in the minor leagues with only brief (and poor) stints in the majors. One of his better early performances came on May 11, 1974, when he personally out-played the opposition by collecting a career-high three hits, knocking in one run, and scoring another at the plate while allowing no runs on four hits over six innings on the mound. Later that season, he broke his elbow and missed significant playing time. He returned successfully and, in 1975, was named the International League Most Valuable Pitcher.

== Productive years ==
Swan broke into the majors for good in 1976. In the Mets' last good season of the decade, Swan was the fifth starter and posted statistics slightly below the league average with a 3.54 ERA and a 6–9 record. His highlight was his first victory of the season when he pitched a five-hit complete game shutout with 11 strikeouts. He was inconsistent for the season. After four terrible starts, the following three starts resulted in just a single earned run on 13 hits and four walks over 26 innings with 21 strikeouts — a fantastic 0.35 ERA.

In 1977, Swan's numbers declined slightly but so did the rest of the team's as number one starter, Jerry Koosman, lost 20 games and the Mets sank into last place in the division.

In 1978, the Mets struggled to a 66–96 record but Swan started the season with a five-hit complete game shutout, the third of his career. In the second game of a July 4, 1978 doubleheader, Swan logged a career-high 13 strikeouts but surrendered two ninth-inning runs to lose the game 3–2. The loss dropped his record to 1–5 despite a very good 2.66 ERA. Swan's ERA continued improving and he won his next seven decisions. On September 16, he allowed one run and three hits over nine innings but was again denied a win. At season's end, Swan had the best ERA in the National League as well as the second-best WHIP and second-best hits per nine innings. His ERA was only 1.67 at Shea Stadium. Despite his excellent statistics, he finished with only a 9–6 record. The Mets were the third-worst pitching team in the league, and they finished with the worst record in the N.L.

1979 was another good season for Swan and was also his most active. He set career highs in innings pitched, games started, complete games, shutouts and BFP. Swan was the lone bright spot for the Mets' pitching staff. His 14 wins were not only a career-best but were more than any two of his teammates combined. The Mets finished with 99 losses, again last in the National League.

After his two good seasons for the Mets, Swan signed a contract which made him the highest paid pitcher in Mets history at the time. In response, he began 1980 with an even better ERA than either 1978 or 1979. In mid-June, he was 5–4 with a 2.21 ERA for a team which finished 67-95, but which was flirting with .500 until mid-August. After losing his next four decisions, Swan was placed on the disabled list in mid-July with what turned out to be a torn rotator cuff. He made two more starts a month later but pitched poorly in the first start, left the second start after only two innings, and was done for the season. He started 1981 with a loss but left his second game on April 26 after only one batter on a freak play. Swan began the game by giving up a hit to the first batter of the game. On the fifth pitch of the game, when the runner on first base took off to steal second base, Swan's rib was fractured when catcher Ron Hodges nailed him in the back with his throw towards second. As a result, Swan landed on the disabled list. He returned more than a month later and made two relief appearances before the 1981 Major League Baseball strike cancelled the next two months. When play resumed, Swan was back on the disabled list and made only one more start the rest of the season.

After missing almost all of 1981 with a rotator cuff injury and the aforementioned broken rib and baseball strike, Swan returned healthy in 1982 and finished second to Joe Morgan for the N.L. Comeback Player of the Year Award. His 11 wins were again the highest total on the team, and he was the only pitcher on the team with a winning record and more than three decisions. For the first time in his career, he accumulated significant time as a relief pitcher and managed a fantastic 1.30 ERA in the new role. Swan even hit the only home run of his career on August 4, although the event was overshadowed by his teammate Joel Youngblood becoming the only player in major league history to play for two teams in two cities in one day.

== Winding down ==
After his comeback year of 1982, Swan felt something pop in his arm during a spring training game in 1983. He pitched through the injury but it severely limited his endurance. He was again effective in relief but his ERA as a starter rose to a terrible 6.22. In 1984, while the Mets were finally ending years of futility, Swan managed only ten awful relief appearances before being released on May 9. The California Angels signed him two weeks later but he was benched for good after two more bad appearances, which were the last of his career.

== Post-retirement ==
After numerous injuries forced the end of his career, Swan decided to invest himself in the pseudoscientific medical technique of Rolfing. He graduated from the Rolf Institute in Boulder, Colorado, and opened a practice in Connecticut.

== See also ==
- List of Major League Baseball annual ERA leaders
