= Russ McQueen =

American baseball pitcher (born 1953)

- Pitcher
- Born: 1953 (age 72–73)
- Bats: Right Throws: Right

Career highlights and awards
- College World Series Most Outstanding Player (1972)

Russell Leroy McQueen (born 1953) is an American baseball pitcher. In the 1972 College World Series, he had a string of 14 consecutive scoreless innings.

On March 30, 1974, he pitched a no-hitter. That was the first game ever played at Dedeaux Field.

Following his collegiate career, he was drafted by the California Angels in the 14th round of the 1974 amateur draft. He played two seasons in their minor league system, 1975 and 1976, never reaching the majors. In 1975, he played for the Salinas Packers, going 6–5 with a 3.16 ERA in 54 relief appearances. In 1976, he played for the Packers and El Paso Diablos, going 3–2 with a 2.54 ERA in 26 games with the Packers and 0–2 in 15 games with a 4.62 ERA with the Diablos.

He graduated from the University of Southern California's Marshall School of Business in 1974.
