= 1972 Major League Baseball draft =

Major League Baseball draft

Overview
- First selection: Dave Roberts; San Diego Padres
- First round selections: 24
- Hall of Famers: 2: P Dennis Eckersley; C Gary Carter

The 1972 Major League Baseball draft took place prior to the 1972 MLB season. The draft saw the San Diego Padres select Dave Roberts first overall.

== First round selections ==
= All-Star	= Baseball Hall of Famer

The following are the first round picks in the 1972 Major League Baseball draft.

Pick	Player	Team	Position	Hometown/School
1	Dave Roberts	San Diego Padres	3B	University of Oregon
2	Rick Manning	Cleveland Indians	SS	Niagara Falls, New York
3	Larry Christenson	Philadelphia Phillies	RHP	Marysville, Washington
4	Roy Howell	Texas Rangers	3B	Lompoc, California
5	Bob Goodman	Montreal Expos	C	Memphis, Tennessee
6	Dan Thomas	Milwaukee Brewers	1B	Southern Illinois University
7	Larry Payne	Cincinnati Reds	RHP	Bedias, Texas
8	Dick Ruthven	Minnesota Twins	RHP	Fresno State University
9	Steve Englishbey	Houston Astros	OF	Houston, Texas
10	Dave Chalk	Los Angeles Angels	3B	University of Texas
11	Preston Hanna	Atlanta Braves	RHP	Pensacola, Florida
12	Mike Ondina	Chicago White Sox	OF	Rancho Cordova, California
13	Richard Bengston	New York Mets	C	Peoria, Illinois
14	Scott McGregor	New York Yankees	LHP	El Segundo, California
15	Brian Vernoy	Chicago Cubs	LHP	Westminster, California
16	Joel Bishop	Boston Red Sox	SS	Sacramento, California
17	John Harbin	Los Angeles Dodgers	SS	Newberry College
18	Jamie Quirk	Kansas City Royals	SS	Whittier, California
19	Rob Dressler	San Francisco Giants	RHP	Portland, Oregon
20	Jerry Manuel	Detroit Tigers	SS	Rancho Cordova, California
21	Dan Larson	St. Louis Cardinals	RHP	Alhambra, California
22	Chet Lemon	Oakland Athletics	SS	Los Angeles
23	Dwayne Peltier	Pittsburgh Pirates	SS	Anaheim, California
24	Ken Thomas	Baltimore Orioles	C	Bellville, Ohio

* Did not sign

== Other notable selections ==
= All-Star	= Baseball Hall of Famer

Round	Pick	Player	Team	Position
2	29	Ellis Valentine	Montreal Expos	Catcher-Outfielder
2	42	Dennis Leonard	Kansas City Royals	Pitcher
2	43	Bob Knepper	San Francisco Giants	Pitcher
2	47	John Candelaria	Pittsburgh Pirates	Pitcher
3	50	Dennis Eckersley	Cleveland Indians	Pitcher
3	53	Gary Carter	Montreal Expos	Catcher
3	61	Craig Swan	New York Mets	Pitcher
5	97	Randy Jones	San Diego Padres	Pitcher
7	167	Willie Randolph	Pittsburgh Pirates	Shortstop-Catcher
8	172	Jim Sundberg	Texas Rangers	Catcher
14	336	Rick Honeycutt*	Baltimore Orioles	Shortstop
15	353	Jason Thompson*	Los Angeles Dodgers	Pitcher-First Baseman
17	401	Glenn Burke	Los Angeles Dodgers	Outfielder
17	404	Vern Ruhle	Detroit Tigers	Pitcher
25	572	Mike Hargrove	Texas Rangers	First Baseman
26	596	Lyman Bostock	Minnesota Twins	Outfielder

* Did not sign

== Background ==
The Montreal Expos had perhaps their best draft in franchise history. The Expos grabbed outfielder Ellis Valentine in round two of the June regular phase and then selected catcher Gary Carter one round later. The Pirates also did well, selecting pitcher John Candelaria in round two and second baseman Willie Randolph in round seven.

Some of the significant picks from the regular phase in June included Dennis Eckersley and Rick Manning (Cleveland). Scott McGregor (New York Yankees) in round one. Also selected in the first round were Chet Lemon (Oakland), Larry Christenson (Philadelphia) and the number one pick, Dave Roberts (San Diego). Roberts went directly to the Padres starting third base position from the University of Oregon campus. The biggest steal was pulled off by the Texas Rangers when they selected infielder Mike Hargrove from Northwestern State University in the 25th round.

Jerry Manuel and Mike Ondina became the first pair of high school teammates to be drafted in the first round of a Major League draft. Both attended Cordova High School in Rancho Cordova, California.

Preceded by Danny Goodwin	1st Overall Picks; Dave Roberts	Succeeded by David Clyde
