= Ken Pape =

American baseball player (born 1951)

- Pinch runner / Infielder
- Born: October 1, 1951 (age 74); San Antonio, Texas, U.S.
- Batted: Right Threw: Right

MLB debut
- May 17, 1976, for the Texas Rangers

Last MLB appearance
- October 3, 1976, for the Texas Rangers

MLB statistics
- Batting average: .217
- Home runs: 1
- Runs batted in: 4
- Stats at Baseball Reference

Teams
- Texas Rangers (1976)

Kenneth Wayne Pape (born October 1, 1951) is an American former baseball player who played infield in the Major Leagues in 1976. He played for the Texas Rangers.
