= Dave Chalk (baseball) =

American baseball player (born 1950)

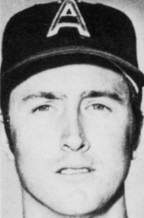
- Third baseman / Shortstop
- Born: August 30, 1950 (age 75); Del Rio, Texas, U.S.
- Batted: Right Threw: Right

MLB debut
- September 4, 1973, for the California Angels

Last MLB appearance
- September 27, 1981, for the Kansas City Royals

MLB statistics
- Batting average: .252
- Home runs: 15
- Runs batted in: 243
- Stats at Baseball Reference

Teams
- California Angels (1973–1978); Texas Rangers (1979); Oakland Athletics (1979); Kansas City Royals (1980–1981)

Career highlights and awards
- 2× All-Star (1974, 1975)

David Lee Chalk (born August 30, 1950) is an American former professional baseball player, whose primary positions were third base and shortstop. Chalk appeared in 903 games over nine seasons (1973–1981) in Major League Baseball for four teams, and was a two-time American League All-Star. Born in Del Rio, Texas, he batted and threw right-handed, and was listed as 5 feet 10 inches (1.78 m) tall and 175 pounds (79 kg).

Chalk played varsity baseball for Justin F. Kimball High School in Dallas, where he was named all-city for two years before graduating in 1968. He also attended the University of Texas at Austin, where he was a three-time All-American and four-time All-Southwest-Conference selection between 1969 and 1972, appearing in three College World Series. The California Angels then selected him in the first round of the June 1972 amateur draft. His first MLB game occurred at the end of his second pro season when, during an extended September audition, he appeared in 24 games, starting 20 of them as the Angels' shortstop. The following year, 1974, Chalk started 95 games at shortstop and another 38 at third base, and, thanks to a write in campaign initiated by a 15 year old fan named Robert Klein, made the All-Star team for the first time. In the 1974 Midsummer Classic, played at Pittsburgh's Three Rivers Stadium, Chalk replaced starter (and Baseball Hall of Famer Brooks Robinson) as the Junior Circuit's third baseman in the eighth inning; he handled no chances on defense, then struck out in his only at bat, against Mike Marshall in the ninth, and the National League breezed to a 7–2 win.

Chalk's two finest seasons came in 1975 and 1977 during his tenure with the Angels. In 1975, he started 149 games at shortstop, batted .273, and set a career high with 56 runs batted in. Selected to the 1975 AL All-Star team, he did not appear in that summer's game, played at Milwaukee County Stadium on July 15. In 1977, Chalk was the Angels' regular third baseman, starting 137 games, and he achieved personal bests in hits (144), doubles (27), and batting average (.277). He moved back to shortstop for the Angels in 1978, his last year as a regular in the majors. He was traded to his hometown team, the Texas Rangers, in 1979 for veteran shortstop Bert Campaneris, but he spent only five weeks with the Rangers before he was shipped on to the Oakland Athletics. Electing free agency during the 1979–1980 offseason, he signed with the Kansas City Royals, and got into 96 games as a utility infielder in 1980 and 1981. Along the way, as a member of the 1980 American League champion Royals, Chalk appeared in his only World Series. In Game 2, he came in for another future Hall of Fame third baseman, George Brett, in the sixth inning. He batted once, against yet another Hall of Famer, Steve Carlton, and played a key role in a three-run rally by drawing a base on balls; he then stole second base and scored on an Amos Otis double. But the Royals could not hold their 4–2 lead, and the opposing Philadelphia Phillies took the game, 6–4, and, eventually, the World Series itself.

Chalk retired from baseball after the 1981 campaign. In his 903 big-league games, he collected 733 hits, with 107 doubles, nine triples and 15 career home runs. He batted .252 lifetime and was credited with 243 runs batted in. He later scouted for the Seattle Mariners.

In 2019, Chalk was inducted into the National College Baseball Hall of Fame. He is also a member of the Texas Hall of Honor and the Texas Baseball Hall of Fame.
