= Temple Owls baseball =

Temple Owls
- Founded: 1927
- Defunct: 2014
- University: Temple University
- Conference: The American
- Location: Philadelphia, Pennsylvania
- Home stadium: Skip Wilson Field (capacity: 1,000)
- Nickname: Owls
- Colors: Cherry and white

College World Series appearances
- 1972, 1977

NCAA regional champions
- 1977

NCAA tournament appearances
- 1959, 1963, 1968, 1972, 1973, 1975, 1976, 1977, 1978, 1981, 1983, 1984, 2001

The Temple Owls baseball team was a varsity intercollegiate athletic team of Temple University in Philadelphia, Pennsylvania, United States, until the end of the 2014 season.

On December 6, 2013, Temple announced that it would cut seven sports, including baseball, at the end of the 2013–14 academic year for financial reasons.

== History ==
This baseball team was a member of the American Athletic Conference in 2014. It was previously a member of the Atlantic 10 Conference and the Big East Conference.

Temple's first baseball team was fielded in 1927 and played home games at Erny Field until 2003. The team played its home games at Skip Wilson Field in Ambler from 2004 until 2013. In 2014, non-conference games were played at Skip Wilson Field and all but one conference game were played at Campbell's Field in Camden, New Jersey.

Temple returned to postseason play in 2014 for the first time since 2008, playing in the American Athletic Conference baseball tournament. The Owls were last coached by Ryan Wheeler.

== Temple in the NCAA tournament ==
Temple appeared in the NCAA tournament thirteen times, the most for any discontinued Division I program.

Year	Record	Pct	Notes
1959	0-1	.000	District 2
1963	0–1	.000	District 2
1968	1–2	.333	District 2
1972	5–2	.714	College World Series 3rd Place, District 2 Champions
1973	2–2	.500	District 2
1975	1–2	.333	Atlantic Regional
1976	2–2	.500	Northeast Regional
1977	4–2	.667	College World Series 7th Place, Northeast Regional Champions
1978	3–2	.600	Northeast Regional
1981	0–2	.000	East Regional
1983	1–2	.333	Northeast Regional
1984	0–2	.000	Mideast Regional
2001	0–2	.000	Fullerton Regional
TOTALS	19–24	.442	

== See also ==
- List of defunct college baseball teams
