= 1980 Chicago White Sox season =

1980 Chicago White Sox
- League: American League
- Division: West
- Ballpark: Comiskey Park
- City: Chicago
- Owners: Bill Veeck
- General managers: Roland Hemond
- Managers: Tony La Russa
- Television: WSNS (Harry Caray, Jimmy Piersall)
- Radio: WBBM (AM) (Harry Caray, Jimmy Piersall, Joe McConnell, Rich King)

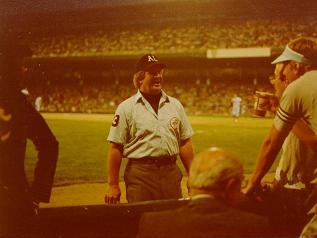
Durwood Merrill chatting with fans at Comiskey Park in Chicago, May 21, 1980.

The 1980 Major League Baseball season was the Chicago White Sox' 80th in Major League Baseball, and the team's 81st season overall. They finished with a record of 70–90, good enough for fifth place in the American League West, 26 games behind the first-place Kansas City Royals.

In 1979 and 1980, Bill Veeck made overtures to Denver interests. An agreement was reached to sell to Edward J. DeBartolo, Sr., who pledged to keep the club in Chicago. His offer was turned down by the owners. Veeck was forced to sell to a different investment group.

== Offseason ==
- January 29, 1980: Glenn Borgmann was signed as a free agent by the White Sox.

== Regular season ==
On October 4, 54-year-old Minnie Miñoso entered a game against the California Angels as a pinch hitter for third baseman Greg Pryor. In doing so, he became the first major leaguer since Nick Altrock to play in five different decades. He grounded out against Angels pitcher Frank Tanana.

=== Season standings ===
AL West
Team	W	L	Pct.	GB	Home	Road
Kansas City Royals	97	65	.599	—	49‍–‍32	48‍–‍33
Oakland Athletics	83	79	.512	14	46‍–‍35	37‍–‍44
Minnesota Twins	77	84	.478	19½	44‍–‍36	33‍–‍48
Texas Rangers	76	85	.472	20½	39‍–‍41	37‍–‍44
Chicago White Sox	70	90	.438	26	37‍–‍42	33‍–‍48
California Angels	65	95	.406	31	30‍–‍51	35‍–‍44
Seattle Mariners	59	103	.364	38	36‍–‍45	23‍–‍58

=== Record vs. opponents ===
1980 American League record Sources:
Team	BAL	BOS	CAL	CWS	CLE	DET	KC	MIL	MIN	NYY	OAK	SEA	TEX	TOR
Baltimore	—	8–5	10–2	6–6	6–7	10–3	6–6	7–6	10–2	7–6	7–5	6–6	6–6	11–2
Boston	5–8	—	9–3	6–4	7–6	8–5	5–7	6–7	6–6	3–10	9–3	7–5	5–7	7–6
California	2–10	3–9	—	3–10	4–6	5–7	5–8	6–6	7–6	2–10	3–10	11–2	11–2	3–9
Chicago	6–6	4–6	10–3	—	5–7	2–10	5–8	5–7	5–8	5–7	6–7	6–7	6–7–2	5–7
Cleveland	7–6	6–7	6–4	7–5	—	3–10	5–7	3–10	9–3	5–8	6–6	8–4	6–6	8–5
Detroit	3–10	5–8	7–5	10–2	10–3	—	2–10	7–6	6–6	5–8	6–6	10–2–1	4–8	9–4
Kansas City	6–6	7–5	8–5	8–5	7–5	10–2	—	6–6	5–8	8–4	6–7	7–6	10–3	9–3
Milwaukee	6–7	7–6	6–6	7–5	10–3	6–7	6–6	—	7–5	5–8	7–5	9–3	5–7	5–8
Minnesota	2–10	6–6	6–7	8–5	3–9	6–6	8–5	5–7	—	4–8	6–7	7–6	9–3	7–5
New York	6–7	10–3	10–2	7–5	8–5	8–5	4–8	8–5	8–4	—	8–4	9–3	7–5	10–3
Oakland	5–7	3–9	10–3	7–6	6–6	6–6	7–6	5–7	7–6	4–8	—	8–5	7–6	8–4
Seattle	6–6	5–7	2–11	7–6	4–8	2–10–1	6–7	3–9	6–7	3–9	5–8	—	4–9	6–6
Texas	6–6	7–5	2–11	7–6–2	6–6	8–4	3–10	7–5	3–9	5–7	6–7	9–4	—	7–5
Toronto	2–11	6–7	9–3	7–5	5–8	4–9	3–9	8–5	5–7	3–10	4–8	6–6	5–7	—

=== Opening Day lineup ===
- Bob Molinaro, DH
- Alan Bannister, 3B
- Claudell Washington, LF
- Lamar Johnson, 1B
- Chet Lemon, CF
- Harold Baines, RF
- Jim Morrison, 2B
- Marv Foley, C
- Greg Pryor, SS
- Steve Trout, P

=== Notable transactions ===
- June 3, 1980: Future Nebraska quarterback Turner Gill was drafted by the White Sox in the second round, 36th pick overall in the 1980 Major League Baseball draft.
- June 12, 1980: Randy Scarbery was traded by the White Sox to the California Angels for Todd Cruz.
- October 3, 1980: Minnie Miñoso was signed as a free agent with the Chicago White Sox.

=== Roster ===
1980 Chicago White Sox
Roster
Pitchers: 46 Francisco Barrios; 30 Ross Baumgarten; 40 Britt Burns; 29 Nardi Contreras; 49 Richard Dotson; 22 Ed Farmer; 36 Guy Hoffman; 31,50 LaMarr Hoyt; 27 Ken Kravec; 24 Mike Proly; 35 Dewey Robinson; 26 Randy Scarbery; 33 Steve Trout; 28 Rich Wortham	Catchers: 38 Glenn Borgmann; 17 Marv Foley; 16 Bruce Kimm; 6 Ricky Seilheimer; Infielders: 8 Kevin Bell; 13 Harry Chappas; 21 Todd Cruz; 23 Lamar Johnson; 7 Randy Johnson; 34 Junior Moore; 12 Jim Morrison; 26 Fran Mullins; 11 Greg Pryor; 25 Mike Squires	Outfielders: 3 Harold Baines; 7 Alan Bannister; 32 Thad Bosley; 47 Rusty Kuntz; 44 Chet Lemon; 9,5 Bob Molinaro; 20 Wayne Nordhagen; 18 Ron Pruitt; 48 Leo Sutherland; 18 Claudell Washington; Other batters: 9 Minnie Miñoso	Manager: 10 Tony La Russa; Coaches: 4 Loren Babe; 15 Art Kusnyer; 37 Ron Schueler; 1 Bobby Winkles

== Player stats ==
=== Batting ===
Note: G = Games played; AB = At bats; R = Runs scored; H = Hits; 2B = Doubles; 3B = Triples; HR = Home runs; RBI = Runs batted in; BB = Base on balls; SO = Strikeouts; AVG = Batting average; SB = Stolen bases

Player	G	AB	R	H	2B	3B	HR	RBI	BB	SO	AVG	SB
Harold Baines, RF	141	491	55	125	23	6	13	49	19	65	.255	2
Alan Bannister, OF, 3B	45	130	16	25	6	0	0	9	12	16	.192	5
Kevin Bell, 3B, DH	92	191	16	34	5	2	1	11	29	37	.178	0
Glenn Borgmann, C	32	87	10	19	2	0	2	14	14	9	.218	0
Thad Bosley, OF	70	147	12	33	2	0	2	14	10	27	.224	3
Harry Chappas, SS, DH	26	50	6	8	2	0	0	2	4	10	.160	0
Todd Cruz, SS	90	293	23	68	11	1	2	18	9	54	.232	2
Marv Foley, C	68	137	14	29	5	0	4	15	9	22	.212	0
Lamar Johnson, 1B, DH	147	541	51	150	26	3	13	81	47	53	.277	2
Randy Johnson, DH, LF	12	20	0	4	0	0	0	3	2	4	.200	0
Bruce Kimm, C	100	251	20	61	10	0	1	19	17	26	.243	1
Rusty Kuntz, OF	36	62	5	14	4	0	0	3	5	13	.226	1
Chet Lemon, CF, DH	147	514	76	150	32	6	11	51	71	56	.292	6
Minnie Miñoso, PH	2	2	0	0	0	0	0	0	0	0	.000	0
Bob Molinaro, LF, DH	119	344	48	100	16	4	5	36	26	29	.291	18
Junior Moore, 3B, DH	45	121	9	31	4	1	1	10	7	11	.256	0
Jim Morrison, 2B	162	604	66	171	40	0	15	57	36	74	.283	9
Fran Mullins, 3B	21	62	9	12	4	0	0	3	9	8	.194	0
Wayne Nordhagen, LF, RF, DH	123	415	45	115	22	4	15	59	10	45	.277	0
Ron Pruitt, OF, DH, C, 3B	33	70	8	21	2	0	2	11	8	7	.300	0
Greg Pryor, SS, 3B, 2B	122	338	32	81	18	4	1	29	12	35	.240	2
Ricky Seilheimer, C	21	52	4	11	3	1	1	3	4	15	.212	1
Mike Squires, 1B	131	343	38	97	11	3	2	33	33	24	.283	8
Leo Sutherland, LF, CF	34	89	9	23	3	0	0	5	1	11	.258	4
Claudell Washington, LF, RF, DH	32	90	15	26	4	2	1	12	5	19	.289	4
Team totals	162	5444	587	1408	255	38	91	547	399	670	.272	68

=== Pitching ===
Note: W = Wins; L = Losses; ERA = Earned run average; G = Games pitched; GS = Games started; SV = Saves; IP = Innings pitched; H = Hits allowed; R = Runs allowed; ER = Earned runs allowed; HR = Home runs allowed; BB = Walks allowed; K = Strikeouts

Player	W	L	ERA	G	GS	SV	IP	H	R	ER	HR	BB	K
Francisco Barrios	1	1	4.96	3	3	0	16.1	21	9	9	4	8	2
Ross Baumgarten	2	12	3.44	24	23	0	136.0	127	60	52	10	52	66
Britt Burns	15	13	2.84	34	32	0	238.0	213	83	75	17	65	133
Nardi Contreras	0	0	5.93	8	0	0	13.2	18	10	9	1	9	8
Richard Dotson	12	10	4.27	33	32	0	198.0	185	105	94	20	89	109
Ed Farmer	7	9	3.34	64	0	30	99.2	92	37	37	6	67	54
Guy Hoffman	1	0	2.63	23	1	1	37.2	38	12	11	1	19	24
LaMarr Hoyt	9	3	4.57	24	13	0	112.1	123	66	57	8	44	55
Ken Kravec	3	6	6.94	20	15	0	81.2	100	71	63	13	47	37
Mike Proly	5	10	3.07	62	3	8	146.2	136	67	50	7	67	56
Dewey Robinson	1	1	3.09	15	0	0	35.0	26	13	12	2	16	28
Randy Scarbery	1	2	4.08	15	0	2	28.2	24	14	13	1	7	18
Steve Trout	9	16	3.70	32	30	0	199.2	229	102	82	14	54	89
Rich Wortham	4	7	5.97	41	10	1	92.0	102	73	61	4	63	45
Team totals	70	90	3.92	162	162	42	1435.1	1434	722	625	108	607	724

== Farm system ==
Level	Team	League	Manager
AAA	Iowa Oaks	American Association	Pete Ward and Sam Ewing
AA	Glens Falls White Sox	Eastern League	Mike Pazik
A	Appleton Foxes	Midwest League	Gordon Lund
Rookie	GCL White Sox	Gulf Coast League	Duane Shaffer
