= 1973 College Baseball All-America Team =

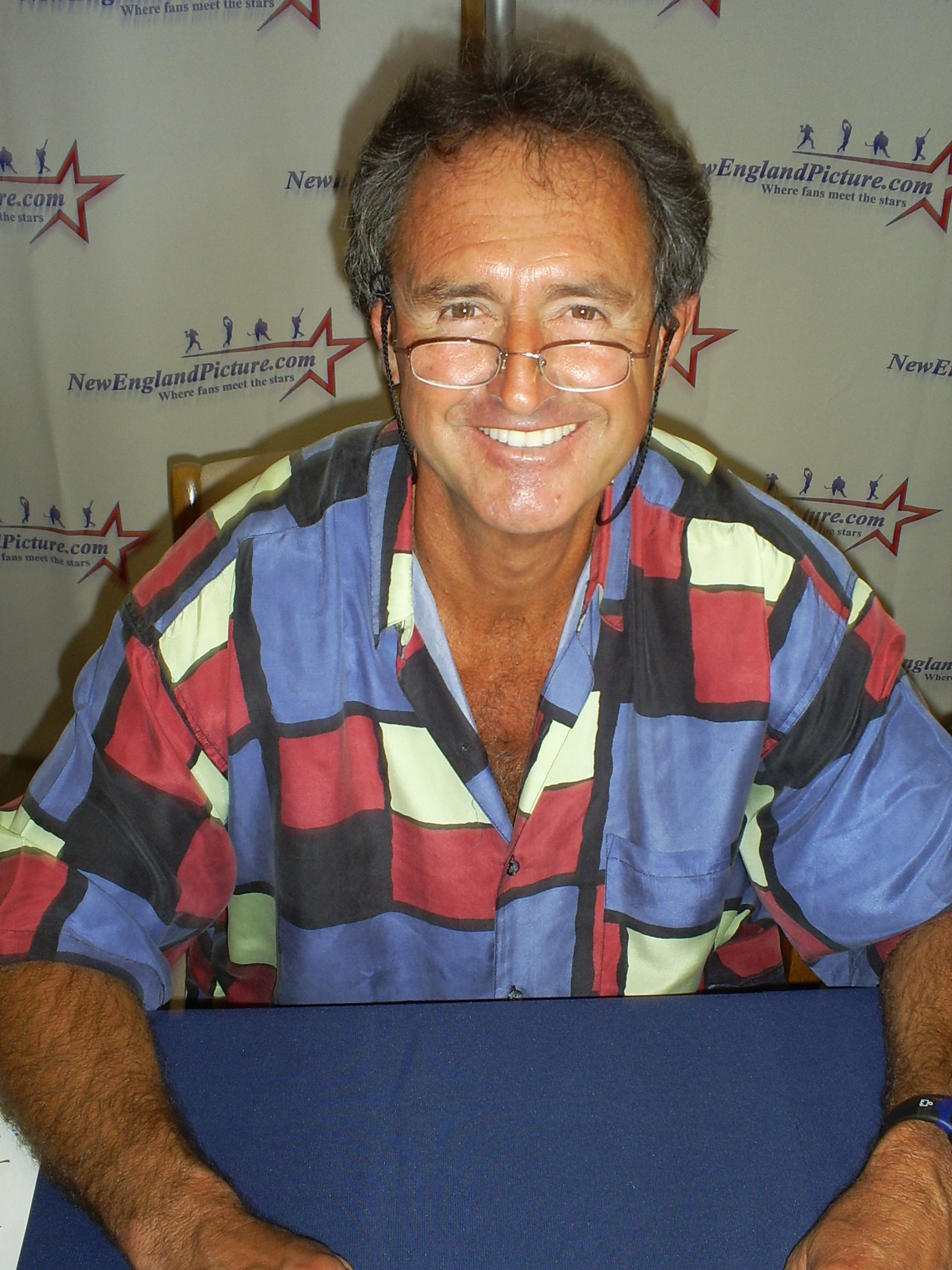
1973 All-Americans included 9× MLB All-Star Fred Lynn.

This is a list of college baseball players named first team All-Americans for the 1973 NCAA University Division baseball season. From 1964 to 1980, there were two generally recognized All-America selectors for baseball: the American Baseball Coaches Association and The Sporting News.

== Key ==
| A | American Baseball Coaches Association |
| S | The Sporting News |
| | Member of the National College Baseball Hall of Fame |
| | Consensus All-American – selected by both organizations |
| | Consensus All-American – selected by one organization |

== All-Americans ==
| Position | Name | School | # | A | S | Other awards and honors |
|---|---|---|---|---|---|---|
| Pitcher | Eddie Bane | Arizona State | 2 | ✓ | ✓ | The Sporting News Player of the Year |
| Pitcher | Ron Roznovsky | Texas | 1 | ✓ | — | |
| Pitcher | Randy Scarbery | USC | 1 | — | ✓ | |
| Catcher | John Stearns | Colorado | 2 | ✓ | ✓ | |
| First baseman | Jerry Tabb | Tulsa | 2 | ✓ | ✓ | |
| Second baseman | Tom McMillan | Jacksonville | 1 | — | ✓ | |
| Second baseman | Phil Turner | TCU | 1 | ✓ | — | |
| Shortstop | Ed McMahon | UMass | 1 | — | ✓ | |
| Shortstop | Roy Smalley III | USC | 1 | ✓ | — | |
| Third baseman | Charlie Bates | Cal State Los Angeles | 1 | — | ✓ | |
| Third baseman | Keith Moreland | Texas | 1 | ✓ | — | |
| Outfielder | Paul Husband | Ole Miss | 1 | — | ✓ | |
| Outfielder | Fred Lynn | USC | 1 | — | ✓ | |
| Outfielder | Steve Newell | UMass | 1 | ✓ | — | |
| Outfielder | Russ Noah | Loyola Marymount | 1 | — | ✓ | |
| Outfielder | Bobby Tucker | Tennessee | 1 | ✓ | — | |
| Outfielder | Joe Wallis | Southern Illinois | 1 | ✓ | — | |
| Outfielder | Dave Winfield | Minnesota | 1 | — | ✓ | College World Series Most Outstanding Player |

== See also ==
- List of college baseball awards
