= 1979 Chicago White Sox season =

1979 Chicago White Sox
- League: American League
- Division: West
- Ballpark: Comiskey Park
- City: Chicago, Illinois
- Owners: Bill Veeck
- General managers: Roland Hemond
- Managers: Don Kessinger, Tony La Russa
- Television: WSNS-TV
- Radio: WMAQ (AM) (Harry Caray, Lorn Brown, Jimmy Piersall)

The 1979 Chicago White Sox season was the team's 80th season overall, and their 79th in Major League Baseball. The team finished in fifth place in the American League West with a record of 73 wins and 87 losses, 15 games behind the first-place California Angels.

== Regular season ==
The team opened the season with reserve infielder Don Kessinger acting as player-manager. He was relieved of his managerial duties on August 2, with the team's record at 46–60, at which point he also retired as a player. He was replaced by coach Tony La Russa, making his major league managerial debut. The team went 27-27 the rest of the season.

=== Season standings ===
AL West
Team	W	L	Pct.	GB	Home	Road
California Angels	88	74	.543	—	49‍–‍32	39‍–‍42
Kansas City Royals	85	77	.525	3	46‍–‍35	39‍–‍42
Texas Rangers	83	79	.512	5	44‍–‍37	39‍–‍42
Minnesota Twins	82	80	.506	6	39‍–‍42	43‍–‍38
Chicago White Sox	73	87	.456	14	33‍–‍46	40‍–‍41
Seattle Mariners	67	95	.414	21	36‍–‍45	31‍–‍50
Oakland Athletics	54	108	.333	34	31‍–‍50	23‍–‍58

=== Record vs. opponents ===
1979 American League record Sources:
Team	BAL	BOS	CAL	CWS	CLE	DET	KC	MIL	MIN	NYY	OAK	SEA	TEX	TOR
Baltimore	—	8–5	9–3	8–3	8–5	7–6	6–6	8–5	8–4	5–6	8–4	10–2	6–6	11–2
Boston	5–8	—	5–7	5–6	6–7	8–5	8–4	8–4	9–3	5–8	9–3	8–4	6–6	9–4
California	3–9	7–5	—	9–4	6–6	4–8	7–6	7–5	9–4	7–5	10–3	7–6	5–8	7–5
Chicago	3–8	6–5	4–9	—	6–6	3–9	5–8	5–7	5–8	4–8	9–4	5–8	11–2	7–5
Cleveland	5–8	7–6	6–6	6–6	—	6–6	6–6	4–9	8–4	5–8	8–4	7–5	5–7	8–5
Detroit	6–7	5–8	8–4	9–3	6–6	—	5–7	6–7	4–8	7–6	7–5	7–5	6–6	9–4
Kansas City	6–6	4–8	6–7	8–5	6–6	7–5	—	5–7	7–6	5–7	9–4	7–6	6–7	9–3
Milwaukee	5–8	4–8	5–7	7–5	9–4	7–6	7–5	—	8–4	9–4	6–6	9–3	9–3	10–3
Minnesota	4–8	3–9	4–9	8–5	4–8	8–4	6–7	4–8	—	7–5	9–4	10–3	4–9	11–1
New York	6–5	8–5	5–7	8–4	8–5	6–7	7–5	4–9	5–7	—	9–3	6–6	8–4	9–4
Oakland	4–8	3–9	3–10	4–9	4–8	5–7	4–9	6–6	4–9	3–9	—	8–5	2–11	4–8
Seattle	2–10	4–8	6–7	8–5	5–7	5–7	6–7	3–9	3–10	6–6	5–8	—	6–7	8–4
Texas	6–6	6–6	8–5	2–11	7–5	6–6	7–6	3–9	9–4	4–8	11–2	7–6	—	7–5
Toronto	2–11	4–9	5–7	5–7	5–8	4–9	3–9	3–10	1–11	4–9	8–4	4–8	5–7	—

=== Opening Day lineup ===
- Harry Chappas, SS
- Claudell Washington, RF
- Chet Lemon, CF
- Jorge Orta, DH
- Lamar Johnson, 1B
- Alan Bannister, 2B
- Ralph Garr, LF
- Eric Soderholm, 3B
- Marv Foley, C
- Ken Kravec, P

=== Notable transactions ===
- May 16, 1979: Nardi Contreras was signed as a free agent by the White Sox.
- June 5, 1979: 1979 Major League Baseball draft
  - Ricky Seilheimer was drafted by the White Sox in the 1st round (19th pick).
  - Fran Mullins was drafted by the White Sox in the 3rd round.
  - Jimmy Key was drafted by the White Sox in the 10th round, but did not sign.
- June 15, 1979: Eric Soderholm was traded by the White Sox to the Texas Rangers for Ed Farmer and Gary Holle.
- July 6, 1979: Rich Hinton was traded by the White Sox to the Seattle Mariners for Juan Bernhardt.

=== Roster ===
1979 Chicago White Sox
Roster
Pitchers: 46 Francisco Barrios; 30 Ross Baumgarten; 40 Britt Burns; 49 Richard Dotson; 42 Mark Esser; 22 Ed Farmer; 47 Rich Hinton; 36 Guy Hoffman; 41 Fred Howard; 50 LaMarr Hoyt; 27 Ken Kravec; 55 Jack Kucek; 36 Lerrin LaGrow; 24 Mike Proly; 32,35 Dewey Robinson; 55 Gil Rondon; 26 Randy Scarbery; 37 Ron Schueler; 35 Pablo Torrealba; 33 Steve Trout; 28 Rich Wortham	Catchers: 19 Mike Colbern; 42,0,17 Marv Foley; 5 Milt May; 15 Bill Nahorodny; Infielders: 7 Alan Bannister; 8 Kevin Bell; 13 Harry Chappas; 10 Joe Gates; 23 Lamar Johnson; 11 Don Kessinger; 12 Jim Morrison; 6 Jorge Orta; 16 Greg Pryor; 12 Eric Soderholm; 25 Mike Squires	Outfielders: 22 Thad Bosley; 48 Ralph Garr; 47 Rusty Kuntz; 44 Chet Lemon; 34 Junior Moore; 20 Wayne Nordhagen; 21 Rusty Torres; 18 Claudell Washington	Manager: 11 Don Kessinger; 10 Tony La Russa; Coaches: 31 Fred Martin; 9 Minnie Miñoso; 57 Jimmy Piersall; 37 Ron Schueler; 3 Joe Sparks; 1 Bobby Winkles

=== Disco Demolition Night ===
Disco Demolition Night (also known as "Anti-Disco Night" and "Disco Sucks Night") was a promotional event that took place on July 12, 1979, at Comiskey Park in Chicago. It was held during a scheduled twi-night doubleheader between the Chicago White Sox and the Detroit Tigers. After the first game, a throng of fans stormed the field, damaging it so badly that the second game had to be forfeited to Detroit.

== Player stats ==
=== Batting ===
Note: G = Games played; AB = At bats; R = Runs scored; H = Hits; 2B = Doubles; 3B = Triples; HR = Home runs; RBI = Runs batted in; BB = Base on balls; SO = Strikeouts; AVG = Batting average; SB = Stolen bases

Player	G	AB	R	H	2B	3B	HR	RBI	BB	SO	AVG	SB
Alan Bannister, 2B, LF, 3B, DH	136	506	71	144	28	8	2	55	43	40	.285	22
Kevin Bell, 3B	70	200	20	49	8	1	4	22	15	43	.245	2
Thad Bosley, OF	36	77	13	24	1	1	1	8	9	14	.312	4
Harry Chappas, SS	26	59	9	17	1	0	1	4	5	5	.288	1
Mike Colbern, C	32	83	5	20	5	1	0	8	4	25	.241	0
Marv Foley, C	34	97	6	24	3	0	2	10	7	5	.247	0
Ralph Garr, LF, DH	102	307	34	86	10	2	9	39	17	19	.280	2
Joe Gates, 2B	16	16	5	1	0	1	0	1	2	3	.063	1
Lamar Johnson, 1B, DH	133	479	60	148	29	1	12	74	41	56	.309	8
Don Kessinger, SS	56	110	14	22	6	0	1	7	10	12	.200	1
Rusty Kuntz, OF	5	11	0	1	0	0	0	0	2	6	.091	0
Chet Lemon, CF	148	556	79	177	44	2	17	86	56	68	.318	7
Milt May, C	65	202	23	51	13	0	7	28	14	27	.252	0
Junior Moore, LF, RF, DH	88	201	24	53	6	2	1	23	12	20	.264	0
Jim Morrison, 2B, 3B	67	240	38	66	14	0	14	35	15	48	.275	11
Bill Nahorodny, C, DH	65	179	20	46	10	0	6	29	18	23	.257	0
Wayne Nordhagen, DH, RF, LF, C	78	193	20	54	15	0	7	25	13	22	.280	0
Jorge Orta, DH, 2B	113	325	49	85	18	3	11	46	44	33	.262	1
Greg Pryor, SS, 2B, 3B	143	476	60	131	23	3	3	34	35	41	.275	3
Eric Soderholm, 3B	56	210	31	53	8	2	6	34	19	19	.252	0
Mike Squires, 1B	122	295	44	78	10	1	2	22	22	9	.264	15
Rusty Torres, OF	90	170	26	43	5	0	8	24	23	37	.253	0
Claudell Washington, RF, DH	131	471	79	132	33	5	13	66	28	93	.280	19
Team totals	160	5463	730	1505	290	33	127	680	454	668	.275	97

=== Pitching ===
Note: W = Wins; L = Losses; ERA = Earned run average; G = Games pitched; GS = Games started; SV = Saves; IP = Innings pitched; H = Hits allowed; R = Runs allowed; ER = Earned runs allowed; HR = Home runs allowed; BB = Walks allowed; K = Strikeouts

Player	W	L	ERA	G	GS	SV	IP	H	R	ER	HR	BB	K
Francisco Barrios	8	3	3.61	15	15	0	94.2	88	49	38	9	34	28
Ross Baumgarten	13	8	3.54	28	28	0	190.2	175	82	75	18	84	72
Britt Burns	0	0	5.40	6	0	0	5.0	10	5	3	1	1	2
Richard Dotson	2	0	3.70	5	5	0	24.1	28	13	10	0	6	13
Mark Esser	0	0	16.20	2	0	0	1.2	2	3	3	0	4	1
Ed Farmer	3	7	2.43	42	3	14	81.1	66	36	22	2	42	48
Rich Hinton	1	2	6.05	16	2	2	41.2	57	30	28	4	9	27
Guy Hoffman	0	5	5.34	24	0	2	30.1	30	18	18	0	28	18
Fred Howard	1	5	3.57	28	6	0	68.0	73	34	27	5	34	36
LaMarr Hoyt	0	0	0.00	2	0	0	3.0	2	0	0	0	0	0
Ken Kravec	15	13	3.74	36	35	1	250.0	208	115	104	20	114	132
Jack Kucek	0	0	0.00	1	0	0	0.2	0	4	0	0	3	0
Lerrin LaGrow	0	3	9.17	11	2	1	17.2	27	21	18	2	17	9
Wayne Nordhagen	0	0	9.00	2	0	0	2.0	2	2	2	0	1	2
Mike Proly	3	8	3.87	38	6	9	88.1	89	43	38	6	47	32
Dewey Robinson	0	1	6.28	11	0	0	14.1	11	12	10	1	11	5
Gil Rondón	0	0	3.72	4	0	0	9.2	11	5	4	2	6	3
Randy Scarbery	2	8	4.62	45	5	4	101.1	102	56	52	9	37	45
Ron Schueler	0	1	7.32	8	1	0	19.2	19	16	16	3	14	6
Pablo Torrealba	0	0	1.59	3	0	0	5.2	5	1	1	1	2	1
Steve Trout	11	8	3.89	34	18	4	155.0	165	77	67	10	64	76
Rich Wortham	14	14	4.90	34	33	0	204.0	195	126	111	21	103	119
Team totals	73	86	4.10	160	159	37	1409.0	1365	748	642	114	661	675

== Farm system ==
Level	Team	League	Manager
AAA	Iowa Oaks	American Association	Tony LaRussa and Joe Sparks
AA	Knoxville Knox Sox	Southern League	Gordon Lund
A	Appleton Foxes	Midwest League	Jim Breazeale
