= 1973 ACC tournament =

1973 ACC tournament may refer to:

- 1973 ACC men's basketball tournament
- 1973 Atlantic Coast Conference baseball tournament
