= 1973 USC Trojans baseball team =

American college baseball season

1973 USC Trojans baseball

National champions Pacific-8 Conference champions
- Conference: Pacific-8 Conference
- CB: No. 1
- Record: 51–11 (14–4 Pac-8)
- Head coach: Rod Dedeaux (32nd year)
- Home stadium: Bovard Field

1973 Pacific-8 Conference baseball standings
	Conf.				Overall
Team	W		L	PCT	W		L	PCT
Northern Division
Washington State ^{x}‍‍‍	15	–	3	.833	40	–	15	.727
Oregon ‍‍‍	9	–	9	.500		–		–
Washington ‍‍‍	7	–	11	.389	10	–	11	.476
Oregon State ‍‍‍	5	–	13	.278	15	–	20	.429
Southern Division
No. 1 Southern California ^{x}‍‍‍^{y}	14	–	4	.778	51	–	11	.823
Stanford ‍‍‍	9	–	9	.500	37	–	20	.649
UCLA ‍‍‍	7	–	11	.389	29	–	24	.547
California ‍‍‍	6	–	12	.333	21	–	31	.404
x – Division champion y – Invited to the NCAA tournament As of June 30, 1973; Rankings from Collegiate Baseball

The 1973 USC Trojans baseball team represented the University of Southern California in the 1973 NCAA University Division baseball season. The team was coached Rod Dedeaux in his 32nd season.

The Trojans won the College World Series, defeating the Arizona State Sun Devils in the championship game, winning their fourth of five consecutive national championships, and the fifth in six years.

== Roster ==
1973 USC Trojans roster
Pitchers: Mark Barr; Tim Coffin; Cliff Holland; Brian Heublein; Dwayne Humbles; George Milke; Dan Olson; John Racanelli; Pete Redfern; Jeff Reinke; Randy Scarbery; Rich Simonin	Infielders: Rob Adoplh; Daryl Arenstein; Marvin Cobb; Rich Dauer; Terry Dedeaux; William Edwards; Ken Huizenga; Denny Martindale; Roy Smalley; Catchers: Dennis Littlejohn; Vince Moll; Ed Putnam	Outfielders: Craig Barnes; Tom Bhagwat; Ed Bowman; Anthony Davis; Steve Kemp; Fred Lynn; Dennis Stahl; Creighton Tevlin; Coaches: Rod Dedeaux

== Schedule ==
1973 USC Trojans baseball game log
Regular season
February

Date	Opponent	Score	Overall record	Pac-8 record
February 17	San Diego State	6–1	1–0	–
February 17	San Diego State	5–3	2–0	–
February 20	at UC Irvine	3–1	3–0	–
February 23	Cal Poly Pomona	5–2	4–0	–
February 24	UC Santa Barbara	5–4	5–0	–
February 24	UC Santa Barbara	10–6	6–0	–

March

Date	Opponent	Score	Overall record	Pac-8 record
March 2	at Fresno State	5–0	7–0	–
March 3	at Fresno State	6–2	8–0	–
March 3	at Fresno State	2–0	9–0	–
March 7	Cal State Los Angeles	10–2	10–0	–
March 10	UCLA	6–3	11–0	1–0
March 10	UCLA	10–1	12–0	2–0
March 15	at Arizona State	2–4	12–1	–
March 16	at Arizona State	4–8	12–2	–
March 17	at Arizona State	5–12	12–3	–
March 21	Loyola Marymount	13–12	13–3	–
March 23	Gonzaga	2–1	14–3	–
March 26	vs. Arizona State	3–1	15–3	–
March 27	vs. Hawaii	4–0	16–3	–
March 27	vs. Vanderbilt	4–5	16–4	–
March 29	vs. Washington State	9–2	17–4	–
March 30	vs. Massachusetts	16–4	18–4	–
March 30	at UC Riverside	7–4	19–4	–
March 31	vs. Stanford	8–2	20–4	–
March 31	vs. Arizona State	2–0	21–4	–

April

Date	Opponent	Score	Overall record	Pac-8 record
April 1	at UNLV	9–2	22–4	–
April 3	at San Fernando Valley State	3–15	22–5	–
April 6	California	14–0	23–5	3–0
April 7	California	2–1	24–5	4–0
April 7	California	8–4	25–5	5–0
April 9	Chapman	14–4	26–5	–
April 10	UC Irvine	0–5	26–6	–
April 11	Pepperdine	14–3	27–6	–
April 13	at Stanford	2–1	28–6	6–0
April 14	at Stanford	0–1	28–7	6–1
April 14	at Stanford	3–0	29–7	7–1
April 17	at Hawaii	10–6	30–7	–
April 24	at Cal State Los Angeles	9–4	31–7	–
April 25	at Chapman	5–6	31–8	–
April 27	Stanford	12–8	32–8	8–1
April 28	Stanford	1–0	33–8	9–1
April 28	Stanford	0–3	33–9	9–2

May

Date	Opponent	Score	Overall record	Pac-8 record
May 1	at Cal Poly Pomona	18–13	34–9	–
May 4	at California	4–5	34–10	9–3
May 5	at California	8–2	35–10	10–3
May 5	at California	2–0	36–10	11–3
May 8	Long Beach State	10–3	37–10	–
May 10	at UCLA	5–6	37–11	11–4
May 11	UCLA	6–2	38–11	12–4
May 12	at UCLA	8–4	39–11	13–4
May 12	at UCLA	6–4	40–11	14–4

Postseason
NCAA tournament: Pacific-8 playoffs

Date	Opponent	Site/stadium	Score	Overall record
May 18	vs. Washington State	Buck Bailey Field	13–4	41–11
May 19	vs. Washington State	Buck Bailey Field	11–9	42–11

NCAA tournament: District 8 playoffs

Date	Opponent	Site/stadium	Score	Overall record
May 26	vs. Loyola Marymount	Bovard Field	9–8	43–11
May 27	vs. Loyola Marymount	Bovard Field	2–1	44–11
June 1	vs. Cal State Los Angeles	Bovard Field	4–3	45–11
June 2	vs. Cal State Los Angeles	Bovard Field	13–6	46–11

NCAA tournament: College World Series

Date	Opponent	Site/stadium	Score	Overall record
June 9	vs. Harvard	Rosenblatt Stadium	4–1	47–11
June 10	vs. Texas	Rosenblatt Stadium	4–1	48–11
June 11	vs. Arizona State	Rosenblatt Stadium	3–1	49–11
June 12	vs. Minnesota	Rosenblatt Stadium	8–7	50–11
June 13	vs. Arizona State	Rosenblatt Stadium	4–3	51–11

== Awards and honors ==
Rich Dauer

- All-Pacific-8 First Team

Ken Huizenga

- College World Series All-Tournament Team

Ed Putnam

- All-Pacific-8 First Team

Randy Scarbery

- College World Series All-Tournament Team
- All-America First Team
- All-Pacific-8 First Team

Roy Smalley

- College World Series All-Tournament Team
- All-America First Team
- All-Pacific-8 First Team

== Trojans in the 1973 MLB draft ==
The following members of the USC baseball program were drafted in the 1973 Major League Baseball draft.

=== June regular draft ===
Player	Position	Round	Overall	MLB Team
Randy Scarbery	RHP	1st	23rd	Oakland Athletics
Fred Lynn	OF	2nd	41st	Boston Red Sox
Edwin Bowman	3B	8th	183rd	Baltimore Orioles

=== June secondary draft ===
Player	Position	Round	Overall	MLB Team
Cliff Holland	LHP	1st	16th	Kansas City Royals
