= 1973 NCAA University Division baseball rankings =

1973 NCAA University Division baseball season

Tournament

College World Series
- Champions: USC
- Runners-up: Arizona State
- MOP: Dave Winfield (Minnesota)

Seasons
- ← 1972 1974 →

The following poll makes up the 1973 NCAA University Division baseball rankings. Collegiate Baseball Newspaper published its first human poll of the top 20 teams in college baseball in 1957, and expanded to rank the top 30 teams in 1961.

== Collegiate Baseball ==
Currently, only the final poll from the 1973 season is available.

Rank	Team
1	USC
2	Arizona State
3	Minnesota
4	Texas
5	Georgia Southern
6	Oklahoma
7	Harvard
8	Penn State
9	Miami (FL)
10	Southern Illinois
11	Tulsa
12	Oklahoma State
13	Vanderbilt
14	Miami (OH)
15	South Alabama
16	Temple
17	Oral Roberts
18	Texas–Pan American
19	Providence
20	Colorado
21	Massachusetts
22	Washington State
23	Georgia Tech
24	Florida State
25	Loyola Marymount
26	Delaware
27	Illinois State
28	Arizona
29	Seton Hall
30	Buffalo State
