= Penn State Nittany Lions baseball statistical leaders =

The Penn State Nittany Lions baseball statistical leaders are individual statistical leaders of the Penn State Nittany Lions baseball program in various categories, including batting average, home runs, runs batted in, runs, hits, stolen bases, earned run average, and strikeouts. Within those areas, the lists identify single-game, single-season, and career leaders. The Nittany Lions represent the Pennsylvania State University in the NCAA's Big Ten Conference.

Penn State began competing in intercollegiate baseball in 1875. These lists are updated through the end of the 2025 season.

== Batting average ==
Career (Min. 400 at-bats)
Rk	Player	AVG	Seasons
1	Bob McMullen	.408	1955 1956
2	Dave Simononis	.403	1978 1979 1980
3	Jeff Rumberger	.373	1977 1978 1979
	Michael Campo	.373	1997 1998 1999 2000
5	Mike Karstetter	.365	1985 1986
6	Garry Koch	.364	1973 1974 1975 1976

Season
Rk	Player	AVG	Season
1	Dave Simononis	.478	1978
2	Ron Weidenhammer	.457	1955
3	Tim Hurley	.438	1985
	Wes Olsen	.438	1985
5	Dale Reynolds	.436	1981
6	Bill Hooper	.429	1951
7	Dalton Rumberger	.428	1950
8	Michael Campo	.425	2000
9	Bob McMullen	.420	1956
	Mike Obeid	.420	1982

== Home runs ==
Career
Rk	Player	HR	Seasons
1	Shawn Fagan	43	1997 1998 1999 2000
2	Bryce Molinaro	39	2024 2025 2026
3	Chris Netwall	34	1998 1999 2000 2001
4	Dan Beers	33	1996 1997 1998 1999
5	Jordan Steranka	32	2009 2010 2011 2012
6	Michael Campo	30	1997 1998 1999 2000
	Chris Wright	30	1999 2000 2001 2002
8	Derek Bochna	28	1992 1993 1994 1995
9	Sean Deegan	27	2009 2010 2011 2012
10	Carl Albrecht	25	1995 1996 1997
	Dave Simononis	25	1978 1979 1980
	Eric Gates	25	1990 1991 1992 1993

Season
Rk	Player	HR	Season
1	Michael Anderson	20	2026
2	Ben Heath	19	2010
3	Adam Cecere	17	2024
	Dave Simononis	16	1978
5	Dan Beers	16	1998
6	Shawn Fagan	15	2000
	Bryce Molinaro	15	2026
8	Grant Norris	14	2024
9	Shawn Fagan	13	1999
	Dan Beers	13	1999
	Adam Beers	13	1998
	Chris Wright	13	2001
	Paxton Kling	13	2025
	Bryce Molinaro	13	2025

Single Game
Rk	Player	HR	Season	Opponent
1	Johnny Piacentino	3	2021	Northwestern
	Kris Kremer	3	2019	Duke
	Adam Beers	3	1998	Purdue
	John Schreiner	3	1990	Lafayette

== Runs batted in ==
Career
Rk	Player	RBI	Seasons
1	Shawn Fagan	199	1997 1998 1999 2000
2	Jordan Steranka	183	2009 2010 2011 2012
3	Chris Wright	176	1999 2000 2001 2002
4	Michael Campo	151	1997 1998 1999 2000
5	Bryce Molinaro	150	2024 2025 2026
6	Chris Netwall	137	1998 1999 2000 2001
7	Cory Wine	128	2006 2007 2008 2009
8	Jared Sadlowski	124	1994 1995 1996 1997
9	Lance Thompson	121	2003 2004 2005 2006
10	Eric Gates	119	1990 1991 1992 1993

Season
Rk	Player	RBI	Season
1	Shawn Fagan	80	2000
2	Bryce Molinaro	61	2025
3	Dan Beers	60	1998
4	Chris Wright	58	2000
5	Jordan Steranka	57	2011
	Ben Heath	57	2010
7	Rob Yodice	56	2008
	Chris Wright	56	2001
9	J.T. Marr	54	2024
	Jesse Jaconski	54	2025
	Paxton Kling	54	2025

Single Game
Rk	Player	RBI	Season	Opponent
1	Aaron Novak	8	2015	Charleston Southern
	Ed Washell	8	1984	Cornell
	Andy Onkotz	8	1978	Buffalo
	Don Stine	8	1973	Dickinson

== Runs ==
Career
Rk	Player	R	Seasons
1	Michael Campo	232	1997 1998 1999 2000
2	Shawn Fagan	189	1997 1998 1999 2000
3	Jordan Steranka	165	2009 2010 2011 2012
4	Eric Spadt	157	1997 1998 1999 2000
5	Chris Netwall	153	1998 1999 2000 2001
6	Kevin Billotte	146	1995 1996 1997 1998
7	Chris Wright	141	1999 2000 2001 2002
8	Michael Milliron	139	2002 2003 2004 2005
9	Derek Bochna	137	1992 1993 1994 1995
10	Sean Deegan	133	2009 2010 2011 2012

Season
Rk	Player	R	Season
1	Michael Campo	83	2000
2	Shawn Fagan	72	2000
3	Michael Campo	63	1999
	Paxton Kling	63	2025
5	Matt Wood	55	2022
6	Sean Deegan	54	2011
	Eric Spadt	54	2000
8	Ben Heath	53	2010
	Kevin Billotte	53	1998
10	Shawn Fagan	52	1998
	Mike DeRenzo	52	2000
	Ryan Weingartner	52	2025

Single Game
Rk	Player	R	Season	Opponent
1	Derek Bochna	6	1993	Chicago State

== Hits ==
Career
Rk	Player	H	Seasons
1	Michael Campo	295	1997 1998 1999 2000
2	Jordan Steranka	292	2009 2010 2011 2012
3	Shawn Fagan	251	1997 1998 1999 2000
4	Cory Wine	228	2006 2007 2008 2009
5	Steve Snyder	227	2010 2011 2012 2013 2014
6	Chris Netwall	218	1998 1999 2000 2001
	Chris Wright	218	1999 2000 2001 2002
8	Lance Thompson	217	2003 2004 2005 2006
9	Jared Sadlowski	212	1994 1995 1996 1997
10	Joey DeBernardis	208	2009 2010 2011 2012

Season
Rk	Player	H	Season
1	Michael Campo	111	2000
2	J.T. Marr	92	2024
	Shawn Fagan	92	2000
4	Jordan Steranka	82	2012
5	Brian Ernst	78	2008
	Matt Cavagnaro	78	2007
7	Lance Thompson	77	2006
8	Joe Blackburn	76	2007
	Paxton Kling	76	2025
10	Matt Wood	75	2022
	Joey DeBernardis	75	2010
	Wes Reohr	75	2002

Single Game
Rk	Player	H	Season	Opponent
1	Jay Harry	6	2022	Michigan State

== Stolen bases ==
Career
Rk	Player	SB	Seasons
1	Zack Smithlin	62	2000 2001 2002 2003
2	Michael Campo	57	1997 1998 1999 2000
3	Doug Keener	50	1984 1985 1986 1987
4	Kyle Hannon	47	2021 2022 2023 2024
5	Sean Deegan	41	2009 2010 2011 2012
6	Kevin Billotte	39	1995 1996 1997 1998
7	Dave Hall	37	1990 1991 1992 1993 1994
8	Greg Vogel	36	1973 1974 1975 1976
9	Derek Bochna	35	1992 1993 1994 1995
	Steve Snyder	35	2010 2011 2012 2013 2014
	Blake Lynd	35	2009 2010 2011
	Greg Guers	35	2013 2014 2015 2016

Season
Rk	Player	SB	Season
1	Ryan Weingartner	30	2025
2	Kyle Hannon	27	2023
	Michael Campo	27	1999
4	Sean Deegan	24	2010
	Rod Perry	24	2001
	Zack Smithlin	24	2003
7	Blake Lynd	22	2009
8	Doug Keener	20	1985
	O. J. McDuffie	20	1990
	Michael Campo	20	2000
	Greg Guers	20	2016

Single Game
Rk	Player	SB	Season	Opponent
1	Ray Lopez	4	1991	Lock Haven
	O. J. McDuffie	4	1990	Duquesne

== Earned run average ==
Career
Rk	Player	ERA	Seasons
1	Mitch Lukevics	1.24	1973 1974 1975
2	Denny Lingenfelter	1.37	1966 1967 1968 1969 1970
3	Ed Drapcho	1.48	1955 1956 1957
4	Roy Swanson	1.57	1969 1970 1971
5	Jim Conroy	1.59	1970 1971 1972

Season (Min. 25 IP)
Rk	Player	ERA	Season
1	Rick Sherkel	0.72	1971
2	Bob Fenton	0.95	1961
3	Rick Sherkel	1.02	1972
4	Denny Lingenfelter	1.07	1966
5	Mitch Lukevics	1.16	1975
6	Drew O'Neil	1.34	2007
7	Drew O'Neil	1.88	2008
8	Joe Kurrasch	2.05	2012

== Strikeouts ==
Career
Rk	Player	K	Seasons
1	Nate Bump	352	1995 1996 1997 1998
2	Ed Drapcho	298	1955 1956 1957
3	Mitch Lukevics	266	1973 1974 1975
4	Pete Yodis	234	1998 1999 2000 2001
5	Craig Clark	230	2004 2005 2006 2007
6	Mike Bellaman	220	1982 1983 1984 1985
7	Dan McCall	213	1997 1998 1999 2000 2001
8	Travis Luensmann	211	2022 2023 2024
9	Steven Hill	206	2010 2011 2012 2013
10	Sean Stidfole	204	2003 2004 2005

Season
Rk	Player	K	Season
1	Nate Bump	135	1998
2	Ed Drapcho	116	1957
3	Mitch Lukevics	108	1975
4	Bob Fenton	105	1963
5	Dante Biasi	102	2019
6	Ed Drapcho	99	1955
7	Pete Yodis	97	2000
8	Cal Emery	96	1957
9	T.J. Macy	91	2009
10	Mike Watson	88	2002
	Sal Biasi	88	2017
	Kyle Virbitsky	88	2021

Single Game
Rk	Player	K	Season	Opponent
1	Ed Drapcho	19	1956	Pittsburgh
