= 1973 NCAA University Division baseball tournament =

- Season: 1973
- Teams: 32
- Finals site: Johnny Rosenblatt Stadium; Omaha, Nebraska
- Champions: Southern California (9th title)
- Runner-up: Arizona State (6th CWS Appearance)
- Winning coach: Rod Dedeaux (9th title)
- MOP: Dave Winfield (Minnesota)

The 1973 NCAA University Division baseball tournament was played at the end of the 1973 NCAA University Division baseball season to determine the national champion of college baseball. The tournament concluded with eight teams competing in the College World Series, a double-elimination tournament in its twenty-seventh year.

Eight regional districts sent representatives to the College World Series with preliminary rounds within each district serving to determine each representative. These events would later become known as regionals. Each district had its own format for selecting teams, resulting in 32 teams participating in the tournament at the conclusion of their regular season, and in some cases, after a conference tournament.

The twenty-seventh tournament's champion was Southern California, led by head coach Rod Dedeaux, and Dave Winfield of Minnesota. was the Most Outstanding Player. He was the starting pitcher in two games, tossing 17 1/3 innings, allowing nine hits, one earned run, and striking out 29. In addition, Winfield batted .467 in the Series.

USC became the first team to win four consecutive College World Series and was undefeated (5–0) in the double-elimination format. The final game drew 12,050, the sixth highest to date, and attendance for the fourteen-game Series was 65,356, a new record by nearly seven thousand.

== Tournament ==
The opening rounds of the tournament were played across eight district sites across the country, each consisting of between three and six teams. The winners of each District advanced to the College World Series.

Bold indicates winner.

=== District 1 at Boston, MA ===
Upper round 1
**Northeastern**	**3**
Providence	2
**Harvard**	**4**
UMass	2
Lower round 1
**Providence**	**8**
UMass	7

Upper final
Northeastern	1
**Harvard**	**11**
Lower final
**Providence**	**5**
Northeastern	4

Final
**Harvard**	**8**	—
Providence	1	—

=== District 2 at West Windsor, NJ ===
Upper round 1
**Buffalo**	**1**
Temple	0
**Penn State**	**5**
Seton Hall	3
Lower round 1
**Temple**	**4**
Seton Hall	2

Upper final
Buffalo	1
**Penn State**	**3**
Lower final
**Temple**	**4***
Buffalo	3*

Final
**Penn State**	**4**	—
Temple	2	—

=== District 3 at Starkville, MS ===
First round
1	**Miami (FL)**	**5**
6	South Alabama	3
2	**NC State**	**5**
5	Appalachian State	1
3	**Vanderbilt**	**6**
4	Georgia Southern	2

Second round
Miami (FL)	0
**Georgia Southern**	**1**
**Appalachian State**	**2**
South Alabama	1
**Vanderbilt**	**4***
NC State	2*
**Appalachian State**	**4**
NC State	3

Third round
**Miami (FL)**	**13**
Appalachian State	6
**Georgia Southern**	**5**
Vanderbilt	2

Semifinals
**Miami (FL)**	**6**
Vanderbilt	5

Final
Miami (FL)	1
**Georgia Southern**	**4**

=== District 4 at Carbondale, IL ===
Upper round 1
**Southern Illinois**	**5**
Marshall	2
**Minnesota**	**3**
Miami (OH)	2
Lower round 1
**Miami (OH)**	**5**
Marshall	1

Upper final
Southern Illinois	0
**Minnesota**	**2**
Lower final
**Southern Illinois**	**8**
Miami (OH)	1

Final
**Minnesota**	**7***	—
Southern Illinois	6*	—

=== District 5 at Tulsa, OK ===
Upper round 1
**Oklahoma**	**8**
Creighton	1
**Tulsa**	**6**
Oral Roberts	0
Lower round 1
Creighton	4
**Oral Roberts**	**11**

Upper final
**Oklahoma**	**4**
Tulsa	1
Lower final
**Tulsa**	**2**
Oral Roberts	1

Final
**Oklahoma**	**5***	—
Tulsa	1*	—

=== District 6 at San Antonio, TX ===
Upper round 1
**Trinity**	**6**
Arkansas	0
**Texas**	**7**
Texas–Pan American	1
Lower round 1
**Texas–Pan American**	**4**^{10}
Arkansas	2

Upper final
Trinity	2
**Texas**	**17**
Lower final
**Texas–Pan American**	**4**^{10}
Trinity	3

Final
**Texas**	**14**^{10}	—
Texas–Pan American	12	—

=== District 7 at Spokane, WA & Mesa, AZ ===
Spokane, WA				Mesa, AZ
				**Arizona State**	**14**
**Denver**	2	**4**	**4**	Denver	1
Gonzaga	**8**	3	3

=== District 8 at Los Angeles, CA ===
Semifinal				Final
				Cal State Los Angeles	3	6	—
Loyola Marymount	8	1	—	**Southern California**	**4**	**13**	—
**Southern California**	**9**	**2**	—

== College World Series ==
=== Participants ===
School	Conference	Record (conference)	Head coach	CWS appearances	CWS best finish	CWS record
Arizona State	WAC	56–6 (16–1)	Jim Brock	5 (last: 1972)	1st (1965, 1967, 1969)	20–7
Georgia Southern	Independent	42–10	Ron Polk	0 (last: none)	none	0–0
Harvard	EIBL	35–3 (11–2)	Loyal Park	2 (last: 1971)	5th (1971)	1–4
Minnesota	Big 10	29–14–2 (14–4)	Dick Siebert	3 (last: 1964)	1st (1956, 1960, 1964)	14–3
Oklahoma	Big 8	47–10 (17–4)	Enos Semore	2 (last: 1972)	1st (1951)	5–2
Penn State	Independent	19–5	Chuck Medlar	4 (last: 1963)	2nd (1957)	8–8
Southern California	Pac-8	46–11 (14–4)	Rod Dedeaux	14 (last: 1972)	1st (1948, 1958, 1961, 1963, 1968, 1970, 1971, 1972)	48–18
Texas	Southwest	48–5 (15–3)	Cliff Gustafson	14 (last: 1972)	1st (1949, 1950)	28–25

=== Results ===
==== Bracket ====
Upper round 1
Minnesota	1
Oklahoma	0
Arizona State	3
Penn State	1
Texas	6
Georgia Southern	3
Southern California	4
Harvard	1

Upper round 2
Minnesota	0
Arizona State	3
Texas	1
Southern California	4
Lower round 1
Oklahoma	6
Penn State	0
Georgia Southern	8
Harvard	0

Upper final
Arizona State	1
Southern California	3
Lower round 2
Texas	10
Oklahoma	2
Minnesota	6
Georgia Southern	2

Semifinals
Southern California	8
Minnesota	7
Arizona State	6
Texas	5

Final
Southern California	4
Arizona State	3

==== Game results ====
Date	Game	Winner	Score	Loser	Notes
June 8	Game 1	Minnesota	1–0	Oklahoma	Dave Winfield: 14 Ks, 6-hit shutout.
June 8	Game 2	Arizona State	3–1	Penn State	
June 9	Game 3	Texas	6–3	Georgia Southern	
June 9	Game 4	Southern California	4–1	Harvard	
June 9	Game 5	Oklahoma	6–0	Penn State	Penn State eliminated
June 10	Game 6	Georgia Southern	8–0	Harvard	Harvard eliminated
June 10	Game 7	Arizona State	3–0	Minnesota	
June 10	Game 8	Southern California	4–1	Texas	
June 11	Game 9	Minnesota	6–2	Georgia Southern	Georgia Southern eliminated
June 11	Game 10	Texas	10–2	Oklahoma	Oklahoma eliminated
June 11	Game 11	Southern California	3–1	Arizona State	
June 12	Game 12	Arizona State	6–5	Texas	Texas eliminated
June 12	Game 13	Southern California	8–7	Minnesota	Minnesota eliminated
June 13	Final	Southern California	4–3	Arizona State	Southern California wins CWS

Final game was on Wednesday night, with an attendance of 12,050.

=== The Minnesota vs. USC semi final game ===
Recalled each year as perhaps the most amazing game in CWS history, Minnesota faced a USC team that featured future major leaguers Rich Dauer, Fred Lynn, and Roy Smalley. Dave Winfield was the starting pitcher for Minnesota. In his first game vs. Oklahoma, he struck out 14 in shutting out the Sooners, 1-0. In the semi-final vs. defending champion USC, Winfield had struck out 15 through 8 innings, allowing only an infield single as Minnesota built a 7-0 lead. USC's Rich Dauer said "In my whole career, even facing the big boys in the majors, I have never seen anything like that," When Dave let go of the ball, it was three feet in front of your face and it seemed like it was going 110 miles an hour."

In the ninth inning, USC opened with a base hit but the next batter grounded into what appeared to be a double play. Television replays indicated the batter was out at first base, but the umpire called him safe and Minnesota coach Dick Siebert was thrown out of the game arguing the call. Two more singles and a key error by the first baseman led to three runs and Winfield was relieved and went to left field. Two relievers allowed five more runs and USC won the game 8–7. "I have played in a lot of memorable big games during my career," Winfield said. "World Series games, league championship games, all-star games, all kinds. But I will never forget that game against USC. Never."

=== All-Tournament Team ===
The following players were members of the All-Tournament Team.

Position	Player	School
P	Eddie Bane	Arizona State
P	Randy Scarbery	USC
P	Bob Shirley	Oklahoma
P	Dave Winfield (MOP)	Minnesota
C	Clint Meyers	Arizona State
1B	Clay Westlake	Arizona State
2B	Bill Berger	Arizona State
3B	Keith Moreland	Texas
SS	Roy Smalley	USC
OF	Ken Huizenga	USC
OF	Carl Person	Georgia Southern
OF	Terry Pyka	Texas

=== Notable players ===
- Arizona State: Gary Allenson, Eddie Bane, Jim Lentine, Paul Moskau, Jim Otten, John Poloni, Jim Umbarger, Bump Wills
- Georgia Southern: Jim Morrison, John Tamargo
- Minnesota: Steve Comer, Dave Winfield
- Oklahoma: Keith Drumright, Bob Shirley, Joe Simpson, Jackson Todd
- Southern California: Rich Dauer, Steve Kemp, Dennis Littlejohn, Fred Lynn, Ed Putman, Pete Redfern, Randy Scarbery, Roy Smalley
- Texas: Bobby Cuellar, Jim Gideon, Keith Moreland, Ken Pape, Rich Wortham

== See also ==
- 1973 NCAA College Division baseball tournament
- 1973 NAIA World Series
