= 1973 Arizona State Sun Devils baseball team =

American college baseball season

1973 Arizona State Sun Devils baseball
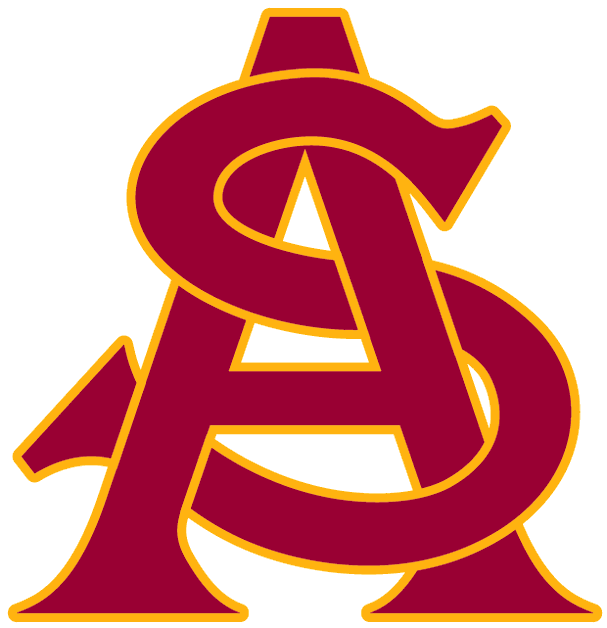

WAC Champions District 7 champions

College World Series, 2nd
- Conference: Western Athletic Conference
- CB: No. 2
- Record: 59–8 (16–1 WAC)
- Head coach: Jim Brock (2nd year)
- Home stadium: Phoenix Municipal Stadium

1973 Western Athletic Conference baseball standings
	Conf.				Overall
Team	W		L	PCT	W		L	PCT
Northern
BYU ^{x}‍‍‍	13	–	5	.722	30	–	20	.600
Wyoming ‍‍‍	9	–	9	.500	21	–	25	.457
Colorado State ‍‍‍	7	–	11	.389	11	–	20	.355
Utah ‍‍‍	7	–	11	.389	11	–	20	.355
Southern
No. 2 Arizona State ^{x‡y} ‍‍‍	16	–	1	.941	59	–	8	.881
No. 28 Arizona ‍‍‍	15	–	5	.750	37	–	16	.698
New Mexico ‍‍‍	4	–	13	.235	28	–	17	.622
UTEP ‍‍‍	2	–	16	.111	18	–	27	.400
x – Division champion ‡ – Championship series champion y – Invited to the NCAA tournament As of June 30, 1973; Rankings from Collegiate Baseball

The 1973 Arizona State Sun Devils baseball team represented Arizona State University in the 1973 NCAA University Division baseball season. The Sun Devils played their home games at Packard Stadium. The team was coached by Jim Brock in his second season at Arizona State.

The Sun Devils reached the College World Series, finishing as the runner up to Southern California.

== Roster ==
1973 Arizona State Sun Devils roster
- Gary Andrews; - Tom Bondurant; - R. J. Harrison; - Mike Kenneth; - Tony Komadina; - Paul Moskau; - Mike Rawlings; - John Sain; - Garret Strong; - Bruce Volney; - Danny White	Pitchers: - Eddie Bane; - Greg Cochran; - Dale Hrovat; - Jim Otten; - John Poloni; - Doug Slocum; - Jim Umbarger; - K. Patton	Infielders: - Bill Berger; - Jeff Oscarson; - Clay Westlake; - Bump Wills; Catchers: - Clint Myers	Outfielders: - Gary Atwell; - Dick Harris; - Dennis Kendrick; - Jim Lentine

== Schedule ==
Legend
Arizona State win
Arizona State loss

1973 Arizona State Sun Devils baseball game log
Regular season

February
Date	Opponent	Site/stadium	Score	Overall record	WAC record
Feb 16	UC Irvine*	Phoenix Municipal Stadium • Phoenix, AZ	L 2–4^{10}	0–1	
Feb 17	UC Irvine*	Phoenix Municipal Stadium • Phoenix, AZ	W 2–1^{8}	1–1	
Feb 17	UC Irvine*	Phoenix Municipal Stadium • Phoenix, AZ	W 5–3	2–1	
Feb 24	Long Beach State*	Phoenix Municipal Stadium • Phoenix, AZ	W 5–3^{7}	3–1	
Feb 24	Long Beach State*	Phoenix Municipal Stadium • Phoenix, AZ	W 8–6	4–1	
Feb 25	Long Beach State*	Phoenix Municipal Stadium • Phoenix, AZ	W 7–1	5–1	
Feb 26	Cal Poly Pomona*	Phoenix Municipal Stadium • Phoenix, AZ	W 2–1^{14}	6–1	
Feb 27	Cal Poly Pomona*	Phoenix Municipal Stadium • Phoenix, AZ	W 5–4	7–1	
Feb 28	Cal Poly Pomona*	Phoenix Municipal Stadium • Phoenix, AZ	W 14–13	8–1	

March
Date	Opponent	Site/stadium	Score	Overall record	WAC record
Mar 2	Cal State Northridge*	Phoenix Municipal Stadium • Phoenix, AZ	W 9–0 (Note: Eddie Bane completed a perfect game, striking 19 en route to the win. As of 2017, no other player for Arizona State has thrown a perfect game.)	9–1	
Mar 3	Cal State Northridge*	Phoenix Municipal Stadium • Phoenix, AZ	L 2–3^{7}	9–2	
Mar 3	Cal State Northridge*	Phoenix Municipal Stadium • Phoenix, AZ	W 5–2	10–2	
Mar 5	Michigan*	Phoenix Municipal Stadium • Phoenix, AZ	W 11–1	11–2	
Mar 6	Michigan*	Phoenix Municipal Stadium • Phoenix, AZ	W 5–2	12–2	
Mar 7	Michigan*	Phoenix Municipal Stadium • Phoenix, AZ	W 5–3	13–2	
Mar 8	Chapman*	Phoenix Municipal Stadium • Phoenix, AZ	W 3–0	14–2	
Mar 9	Wyoming*	Phoenix Municipal Stadium • Phoenix, AZ	W 7–4	15–2	
Mar 9	Chapman*	Phoenix Municipal Stadium • Phoenix, AZ	W 6–1	16–2	
Mar 10	Chapman*	Phoenix Municipal Stadium • Phoenix, AZ	W 13–1^{7}	17–2	
Mar 10	Wyoming*	Phoenix Municipal Stadium • Phoenix, AZ	W 15–5	18–2	
Mar 15	Southern California*	Phoenix Municipal Stadium • Phoenix, AZ	W 4–2	19–2	
Mar 16	Southern California*	Phoenix Municipal Stadium • Phoenix, AZ	W 8–4	20–2	
Mar 17	Southern California*	Phoenix Municipal Stadium • Phoenix, AZ	W 12–5	21–2	
Mar 20	Colorado*	Phoenix Municipal Stadium • Phoenix, AZ	W 7–4	22–2	
Mar 23	Weber State*	Phoenix Municipal Stadium • Phoenix, AZ	W 7–3	23–2	
Mar 24	Oklahoma*	Phoenix Municipal Stadium • Phoenix, AZ	W 9–8^{8}	24–2	
Mar 24	Oklahoma*	Phoenix Municipal Stadium • Phoenix, AZ	W 4–3^{13}	25–2	
Mar 26	vs Southern California*	Indio, CA (Riverside Tournament)	L 1–3	25–3	
Mar 27	at UC Riverside*	Indio, CA (Riverside Tournament)	W 11–3	26–3	
Mar 28	vs UMass*	Indio, CA (Riverside Tournament)	W 7–6^{15}	27–3	
Mar 28	vs Stanford*	Indio, CA (Riverside Tournament)	W 18–2	28–3	
Mar 29	vs Hawaii*	Indio, CA (Riverside Tournament)	W 7–	29–3	
Mar 30	vs Washington State*	Indio, CA (Riverside Tournament)	W 8–0	30–3	
Mar 31	vs Vanderbilt*	Indio, CA (Riverside Tournament)	L 4–6	30–4	
Mar 31	vs Southern California*	Indio, CA (Riverside Tournament)	L 0–2^{12}	30–5	

April
Date	Opponent	Site/stadium	Score	Overall record	WAC record
Apr 5	at Arizona	Wildcat Field • Tucson, AZ	W 9–2	31–5	1–0
Apr 6	at Arizona	Wildcat Field • Tucson, AZ	W 13–10^{10}	32–5	2–0
Apr 7	at Arizona	Wildcat Field • Tucson, AZ	W 7–4	33–5	3–0
Apr 10	Northern Arizona*	Phoenix Municipal Stadium • Phoenix, AZ	W 6–3	34–5	
Apr 13	UTEP	Phoenix Municipal Stadium • Phoenix, AZ	W 5–2	35–5	4–0
Apr 14	UTEP	Phoenix Municipal Stadium • Phoenix, AZ	W 25–3	36–5	5–0
Apr 14	UTEP	Phoenix Municipal Stadium • Phoenix, AZ	W 9–4	37–5	6–0
Apr 16	La Verne*	Phoenix Municipal Stadium • Phoenix, AZ	W 7–3	38–5	
Apr 17	La Verne*	Phoenix Municipal Stadium • Phoenix, AZ	W 13–4	39–5	
Apr 18	La Verne*	Phoenix Municipal Stadium • Phoenix, AZ	W 6–4	40–5	
Apr 20	New Mexico	Phoenix Municipal Stadium • Phoenix, AZ	W 13–1	41–5	7–0
Apr 21	New Mexico	Phoenix Municipal Stadium • Phoenix, AZ	W 12–6	42–5	8–0
Apr 21	New Mexico	Phoenix Municipal Stadium • Phoenix, AZ	W 5–4	43–5	9–0
Apr 24	Grand Canyon*	Phoenix Municipal Stadium • Phoenix, AZ	W 21–3	44–5	
Apr 27	at UTEP	Dudley Field • El Paso, TX	W 20–7	45–5	10–0
Apr 28	at UTEP	Dudley Field • El Paso, TX	W 17–2^{7}	46–5	11–0
Apr 28	at UTEP	Dudley Field • El Paso, TX	W 13–3	47–5	12–0

May
Date	Opponent	Site/stadium	Score	Overall record	WAC record
May 4	at New Mexico	Lobo Field • Albuquerque, NM	W 21–5	48–5	13–0
May 4	at New Mexico	Lobo Field • Albuquerque, NM	W 11–4^{7}	49–5	14–0
May 7	Grand Canyon*	Phoenix Municipal Stadium • Phoenix, AZ	W 4–1	50–5	
May 10	Arizona	Phoenix Municipal Stadium • Phoenix, AZ	W 10–7	51–5	15–0
May 11	Arizona	Phoenix Municipal Stadium • Phoenix, AZ	W 14–1	52–5	16–0
May 12	Arizona	Phoenix Municipal Stadium • Phoenix, AZ	L 4–5	52–6	16–1

Post-season

WAC playoffs
Date	Opponent	Site/stadium	Score	Overall record	WAC CS Record
May 22	BYU	Phoenix Municipal Stadium • Phoenix, AZ	W 9–0	53–6	1–0
May 23	BYU	Phoenix Municipal Stadium • Phoenix, AZ	W 11–0	54–6	2–0

NCAA District 7 playoff
Date	Opponent	Site/stadium	Score	Overall record	NCAAT record
June 1	Denver	Rendezvous Park • Mesa, AZ	W 14–1	55–6	1–0
June 2	Denver	Rendezvous Park • Mesa, AZ	W 14–0	56–6	2–0

College World Series
Date	Opponent	Site/stadium	Score	Overall record	CWS record
June 8	Penn State	Johnny Rosenblatt Stadium • Omaha, NE	W 3–1	57–6	1–0
June 10	Minnesota	Johnny Rosenblatt Stadium • Omaha, NE	W 3–0	58–6	2–0
June 11	Southern California	Johnny Rosenblatt Stadium • Omaha, NE	L 1–3	58–7	2–1
June 12	Texas	Johnny Rosenblatt Stadium • Omaha, NE	W 6–5	59–7	3–1
June 13	Southern California	Johnny Rosenblatt Stadium • Omaha, NE	L 3–4	59–8	3–2
