= 1973 Atlantic Coast Conference baseball tournament =

American college baseball tournament

- Teams: 7
- Format: Seven-team double-elimination tournament
- Finals site: Boshamer Stadium; Chapel Hill, North Carolina
- Champions: NC State (1st title)
- Winning coach: Sam Esposito (1st title)
- Attendance: 6,800

1973 Atlantic Coast Conference baseball standings
	Conf.				Overall
Team	W		L	PCT	W		L	PCT
Clemson ‍†‍‍	10	–	2	.833	24	–	16	.600
NC State ‍‍‡‍^{y}	9	–	3	.750	23	–	10	.697
Virginia ‍‍‍	7	–	5	.583	16	–	12	.571
North Carolina ‍‍‍	5	–	7	.417	11	–	15	.423
Wake Forest ‍‍‍	6	–	9	.400	6	–	16	.273
Maryland ‍‍‍	4	–	7	.364	11	–	9	.550
Duke ‍‍‍	2	–	10	.167	7	–	17	.292
† – Conference champion ‡ – Tournament champion y – Invited to the NCAA tournament As of June 30, 1973; Rankings from Collegiate Baseball

The 1973 Atlantic Coast Conference baseball tournament was the inaugural Atlantic Coast Conference (ACC) baseball tournament. It was held in Chapel Hill, North Carolina from April 19 to April 22, 1973. NC State won the tournament and earned the ACC's automatic bid to the 1973 NCAA University Division baseball tournament.

== Tournament ==
Play-In Rd. (Single Elim.)	Upper round 2	Upper final	Championship
4	Wake Forest	3
1	Clemson	10
5	North Carolina	6
4	Wake Forest	10
1	Clemson	3
3	Virginia	1
6	Maryland	1
3	Virginia	7
3	Virginia	2
2	NC State	1
7	Duke	1
2	NC State	9
2	NC State	8	3
1	Clemson	4	2
Lower round 1	Lower final
3	Virginia	3
4	Wake Forest	3	2	NC State	9
2	NC State	5

== See also ==
- College World Series
- NCAA Division I Baseball Championship
