= 1973 Oklahoma Sooners baseball team =

American college baseball season

1973 Oklahoma Sooners baseball

NCAA District 5 champions Big Eight Conference champions

College World Series, 1–2
- Conference: Big Eight Conference
- Record: 48–12 (17–4 Big Eight)
- Head coach: Enos Semore (6th year)
- Home stadium: Haskell Park

1973 Big Eight Conference baseball standings
	Conf.				Overall
Team	W		L	PCT	W		L	PCT
No. 6 Oklahoma ‍†‍‍^{y}	17	–	4	.810	48	–	12	.800
Oklahoma State ‍‍‍	15	–	5	.750	30	–	6	.833
Colorado ‍‍‍	13	–	8	.619	32	–	11	.744
Kansas State ‍‍‍	9	–	11	.450	20	–	24	.455
Missouri ‍‍‍	8	–	12	.400	12	–	20	.375
Nebraska ‍‍‍	7	–	11	.389	15	–	14	.517
Kansas ‍‍‍	5	–	13	.278	11	–	15	.423
Iowa State ‍‍‍	3	–	13	.188	9	–	21	.300
† – Conference champion y – Invited to the NCAA tournament As of June 30, 1973; Rankings from Collegiate Baseball

The 1973 Oklahoma Sooners baseball team represented the University of Oklahoma in the 1973 NCAA University Division baseball season. The Sooners played their home games at Haskell Park, and played as part of the Big Eight Conference. The team was coached by Enos Semore in his sixth season as head coach at Oklahoma.

The Sooners reached the College World Series, their third appearance in Omaha, where they finished tied for fifth place after recording win against Penn State and losing games to eventual semifinalists Minnesota and Texas.

== Personnel ==
=== Roster ===
1973 Oklahoma Sooners roster
Pitchers: 1 - Stan Meek; 16 - Jackson Todd; 18 - Timothy Paul Fox; 19 - F. Breen Newcomer; 21 - Bob Shirley; 26 - Mickey Lewis Lashley	Catchers: 12 - Glenn Bannister; Outfielders: 7 - Bill E. Severns; 8 - Joe Simpson; 9 - Kenny King; Infielders: 2 - Keith Drumright; 5 - Charles Redmon; 6 - Mike Ford; 23 - Mike Umfleet	- Doug E. Schaefer; 13 - Ted Lair; 14 - Patrick Sullivan; 15 - Mike Marino; 17 - Terry Jolly; 22 - Dean Byrom

=== Coaches ===
1973 Oklahoma Sooners baseball coaching staff
- - Enos Semore - Head coach - 6th Season
- - Gene Stephenson - Assistant coach - 1st season

== Schedule and results ==
Legend
Oklahoma win
Oklahoma loss

1973 Oklahoma Sooners baseball game log
Regular season

March
Date	Opponent	Site/Stadium	Score	Overall Record	Big 8 Record
Mar 2	at LSU New Orleans*	New Orleans, LA	W 5–4	1–0	
Mar 2	at LSU New Orleans*	New Orleans, LA	W 14–0	2–0	
Mar 3	at LSU New Orleans*	New Orleans, LA	L 2–4	2–1	
Mar 3	at Tulane*	Tulane Diamond • New Orleans, LA	W 6–0	3–1	
Mar 3	at Tulane*	Tulane Diamond • New Orleans, LA	W 2–1	4–1	
Mar 11	Missouri–Rolla*	Haskell Park • Norman, OK	W 4–0	5–1	
Mar 11	Missouri–Rolla*	Haskell Park • Norman, OK	W 12–3	6–1	
Mar 11	Missouri–Rolla*	Haskell Park • Norman, OK	W 23–0	7–1	
Mar 13	Oral Roberts*	Haskell Park • Norman, OK	L 1–2	7–2	
Mar 19	vs Denver*	Jerry Kindall Field at Frank Sancet Stadium • Tucson, AZ	W 9–5	8–2	
Mar 19	at Arizona*	Jerry Kindall Field at Frank Sancet Stadium • Tucson, AZ	W 4–3	9–2	
Mar 19	at Arizona*	Jerry Kindall Field at Frank Sancet Stadium • Tucson, AZ	L 0–5	9–3	
Mar 24	vs Weber State*	Phoenix Municipal Stadium • Phoenix, AZ	W 6–1	10–3	
Mar 24	vs Northern Arizona*	Phoenix Municipal Stadium • Phoenix, AZ	W 13–5	11–3	
Mar 24	at Arizona State*	Phoenix Municipal Stadium • Phoenix, AZ	L 8–9^{8}	11–4	
Mar 24	at Arizona State*	Phoenix Municipal Stadium • Phoenix, AZ	L 3–4^{13}	11–5	
Mar 31	Missouri	Haskell Park • Norman, OK	W 7–0	12–5	1–0

April
Date	Opponent	Site/Stadium	Score	Overall Record	Big 8 Record
Apr 1	Missouri	Haskell Park • Norman, OK	W 3–0	13–5	2–0
Apr 1	Missouri	Haskell Park • Norman, OK	W 4–3	14–5	3–0
Apr 4	Central State*	Haskell Park • Norman, OK	W 10–1	15–5	
Apr 4	Central State*	Haskell Park • Norman, OK	W 9–4	16–5	
Apr 4	Central State*	Haskell Park • Norman, OK	W 12–0	17–5	
Apr 6	Kansas State	Haskell Park • Norman, OK	W 7–1	18–5	4–0
Apr 7	Kansas State	Haskell Park • Norman, OK	W 5–4	19–5	5–0
Apr 7	Kansas State	Haskell Park • Norman, OK	W 2–1	20–5	6–0
Apr 11	Southwestern Oklahoma State*	Haskell Park • Norman, OK	W 14–2	21–5	
Apr 11	Southwestern Oklahoma State*	Haskell Park • Norman, OK	W 6–0	22–5	
Apr 11	Southwestern Oklahoma State*	Haskell Park • Norman, OK	W 8–1	23–5	
Apr 13	at Colorado	Varsity Field • Boulder, CO	W 12–2	24–5	7–0
Apr 13	at Colorado	Varsity Field • Boulder, CO	L 5–8	24–6	7–1
Apr 14	at Colorado	Varsity Field • Boulder, CO	L 4–5^{10}	24–7	7–2
Apr 17	Friends*	Haskell Park • Norman, OK	W 5–0	25–7	
Apr 17	Friends*	Haskell Park • Norman, OK	W 2–0	26–7	
Apr 17	Friends*	Haskell Park • Norman, OK	W 5–0	27–7	
Apr 20	Oklahoma State*	Haskell Park • Norman, OK	W 1–0	28–7	8–2
Apr 21	Oklahoma State	Haskell Park • Norman, OK	W 7–1	29–7	9–2
Apr 21	Oklahoma State	Haskell Park • Norman, OK	L 0–2	29–8	9–3
Apr 24	John Brown*	Haskell Park • Norman, OK	W 2–0	30–8	
Apr 24	John Brown*	Haskell Park • Norman, OK	W 11–1	31–8	
Apr 24	John Brown*	Haskell Park • Norman, OK	W 9–0	32–8	
Apr 27	at Kansas*	Quigley Field • Lawrence, KS	L 6–7	32–9	9–4
Apr 27	at Kansas*	Quigley Field • Lawrence, KS	W 9–2	33–9	10–4
Apr 28	at Kansas*	Quigley Field • Lawrence, KS	W 5–2	34–9	11–4

May
Date	Opponent	Site/Stadium	Score	Overall Record	Big 8 Record
May 1	Louisiana Tech*	Haskell Park • Norman, OK	W 16–6	35–9	
May 1	Louisiana Tech*	Haskell Park • Norman, OK	W 13–2	36–9	
May 1	Louisiana Tech*	Haskell Park • Norman, OK	W 5–2	37–9	
May 4	Nebraska	Haskell Park • Norman, OK	W 1–0	38–9	12–4
May 4	Nebraska	Haskell Park • Norman, OK	W 1–0	39–9	13–4
May 5	Nebraska	Haskell Park • Norman, OK	W 5–4	40–9	14–4
May 12	Oklahoma Christian*	Haskell Park • Norman, OK	L 0–1	40–10	
May 12	Oklahoma Christian*	Haskell Park • Norman, OK	W 9–8	41–10	
May 16	at Iowa State	Cap Timm Field • Ames, IA	W 18–9	42–10	15–4
May 17	at Iowa State	Cap Timm Field • Ames, IA	W 6–0	43–10	16–4
May 17	at Iowa State	Cap Timm Field • Ames, IA	W 9–4	44–10	17–4

Postseason

NCAA District 5
Date	Opponent	Site/Stadium	Score	Overall Record	Reg Record
May 28	Creighton	Tulsa, OK	W 8–1	45–10	1–0
May 29	Tulsa	Tulsa, OK	W 4–1	46–10	2–0
May 30	Tulsa	Tulsa, OK	W 5–3	47–10	3–0

College World Series
Date	Opponent	Site/Stadium	Score	Overall Record	CWS Record
June 8	Minnesota	Johnny Rosenblatt Stadium • Omaha, NE	L 0–1	47–11	0–1
June 9	Penn State	Johnny Rosenblatt Stadium • Omaha, NE	'W 6–0	48–11	1–1
June 11	Texas	Johnny Rosenblatt Stadium • Omaha, NE	L 2–10	48–12	1–2
