= 1973 NCAA University Division baseball season =

Baseball season

- Number of teams: 216

NCAA tournament

College World Series
- Champions: Southern California (9th title)
- Runners-up: Arizona State (6th CWS Appearance)
- Winning coach: Rod Dedeaux (9th title)
- MOP: Dave Winfield (Minnesota)

Seasons
- ← 1972 1974 →

The 1973 NCAA University Division baseball season, play of college baseball in the United States organized by the National Collegiate Athletic Association (NCAA) began in the spring of 1973. The season progressed through the regular season and concluded with the 1973 College World Series. The College World Series, held for the 27th time in 1973, consisted of one team from each of eight geographical districts and was held in Omaha, Nebraska at Johnny Rosenblatt Stadium as a double-elimination tournament. Southern California claimed the championship for the fourth year in a row, en route to five consecutive titles.

== Realignment ==
- Houston joined the Southwest Conference, leaving the ranks of independents.

== Conference winners ==
This is a partial list of conference champions from the 1973 season. Each of the eight geographical districts chose, by various methods, the team that would represent them in the NCAA tournament. 13 teams earned automatic bids by winning their conference championship while 19 teams earned at-large selections.

Conference	Regular season winner	Conference tournament	Tournament venue • city	Tournament winner
Atlantic Coast Conference	Clemson	1973 Atlantic Coast Conference baseball tournament	Boshamer Stadium • Chapel Hill, NC	NC State
Big Eight Conference	Oklahoma	No tournament		
Big Ten Conference	Minnesota	No tournament		
EIBL	Harvard	No tournament		
Mid-American Conference	Miami (OH)	No tournament		
Pacific-8 Conference	North - Washington State; South - Southern California	No tournament		
Southeastern Conference	Vanderbilt	No tournament		
Southern Conference	Appalachian State	No tournament		
Southwest Conference	Texas	No tournament		
Western Athletic Conference	North - BYU; South - Arizona State	1973 Western Athletic Conference Baseball Championship Series	Phoenix Municipal Stadium • Phoenix, AZ	Arizona State
Yankee Conference	UMass	No tournament		

== Conference standings ==
The following is an incomplete list of conference standings:

1973 Atlantic Coast Conference baseball standings
	Conf.				Overall
Team	W		L	PCT	W		L	PCT
Clemson ‍†‍‍	10	–	2	.833	24	–	16	.600
NC State ‍‍‡‍^{y}	9	–	3	.750	23	–	10	.697
Virginia ‍‍‍	7	–	5	.583	16	–	12	.571
North Carolina ‍‍‍	5	–	7	.417	11	–	15	.423
Wake Forest ‍‍‍	6	–	9	.400	6	–	16	.273
Maryland ‍‍‍	4	–	7	.364	11	–	9	.550
Duke ‍‍‍	2	–	10	.167	7	–	17	.292
† – Conference champion ‡ – Tournament champion y – Invited to the NCAA tournament As of June 30, 1973; Rankings from Collegiate Baseball

1973 Big Eight Conference baseball standings
	Conf.				Overall
Team	W		L	PCT	W		L	PCT
No. 6 Oklahoma ‍†‍‍^{y}	17	–	4	.810	48	–	12	.800
Oklahoma State ‍‍‍	15	–	5	.750	30	–	6	.833
Colorado ‍‍‍	13	–	8	.619	32	–	11	.744
Kansas State ‍‍‍	9	–	11	.450	20	–	24	.455
Missouri ‍‍‍	8	–	12	.400	12	–	20	.375
Nebraska ‍‍‍	7	–	11	.389	15	–	14	.517
Kansas ‍‍‍	5	–	13	.278	11	–	15	.423
Iowa State ‍‍‍	3	–	13	.188	9	–	21	.300
† – Conference champion y – Invited to the NCAA tournament As of June 30, 1973; Rankings from Collegiate Baseball

1973 Big Ten Conference baseball standings
	Conf.						Overall
Team	W		L		T	PCT	W		L		T	PCT
No. 3 Minnesota ‍†‍‍^{y}	14	–	4	–	0	.778	31	–	16	–	2	.653
Michigan ‍‍‍	12	–	6	–	0	.667	22	–	16	–	0	.579
Ohio State ‍‍‍	11	–	7	–	0	.611	22	–	14	–	1	.608
Wisconsin ‍‍‍	8	–	8	–	0	.500	10	–	14	–	0	.417
Michigan State ‍‍‍	9	–	9	–	0	.500	27	–	20	–	0	.574
Northwestern ‍‍‍	8	–	8	–	0	.500	28	–	12	–	0	.700
Illinois ‍‍‍	8	–	10	–	0	.444	21	–	13	–	0	.618
Indiana ‍‍‍	8	–	10	–	0	.444	20	–	16	–	0	.556
Iowa ‍‍‍	8	–	10	–	0	.444	16	–	14	–	1	.532
Purdue ‍‍‍	2	–	16	–	0	.111	8	–	26	–	0	.235
† – Conference champion y – Invited to the NCAA tournament As of June 30, 1973; Rankings from Collegiate Baseball

1973 Pacific-8 Conference baseball standings
	Conf.				Overall
Team	W		L	PCT	W		L	PCT
Northern Division
Washington State ^{x}‍‍‍	15	–	3	.833	40	–	15	.727
Oregon ‍‍‍	9	–	9	.500		–		–
Washington ‍‍‍	7	–	11	.389	10	–	11	.476
Oregon State ‍‍‍	5	–	13	.278	15	–	20	.429
Southern Division
No. 1 Southern California ^{x}‍‍‍^{y}	14	–	4	.778	51	–	11	.823
Stanford ‍‍‍	9	–	9	.500	37	–	20	.649
UCLA ‍‍‍	7	–	11	.389	29	–	24	.547
California ‍‍‍	6	–	12	.333	21	–	31	.404
x – Division champion y – Invited to the NCAA tournament As of June 30, 1973; Rankings from Collegiate Baseball

1973 Southern Conference baseball standings
	Conf.				Overall
Team	W		L	PCT	W		L	PCT
Appalachian State ‍†‍‍^{y}	11	–	3	.786	14	–	10	.583
East Carolina ‍‍‍	10	–	4	.714	16	–	8	.667
Richmond ‍‍‍	8	–	5	.615	16	–	8	.667
The Citadel ‍‍‍	8	–	5	.615	16	–	8	.667
Furman ‍‍‍	6	–	6	.500	16	–	15	.516
William & Mary ‍‍‍	5	–	6	.455	11	–	15	.423
Davidson ‍‍‍	1	–	10	.091	8	–	15	.348
VMI ‍‍‍	0	–	10	.000	3	–	14	.176
y – Invited to the NCAA tournament As of June 30, 1973; Rankings from Collegiate Baseball

1973 Southwest Conference baseball standings
	Conf.				Overall
Team	W		L	PCT	W		L	PCT
No. 4 Texas ‍†‍‍^{y}	15	–	3	.833	50	–	7	.877
TCU ‍‍‍	12	–	7	.632	31	–	12	.721
Texas A&M ‍‍‍	9	–	8	.529	19	–	9	.679
Baylor ‍‍‍	9	–	9	.500	21	–	17	.553
Houston ‍‍‍	8	–	11	.421	15	–	16	.484
Rice ‍‍‍	6	–	10	.375	16	–	14	.533
Texas Tech ‍‍‍	6	–	10	.375	12	–	16	.429
SMU ‍‍‍	5	–	12	.294	10	–	18	.357
† – Conference champion y – Invited to the NCAA tournament As of June 30, 1973; Rankings from Collegiate Baseball

1973 Western Athletic Conference baseball standings
	Conf.				Overall
Team	W		L	PCT	W		L	PCT
Northern
BYU ^{x}‍‍‍	13	–	5	.722	30	–	20	.600
Wyoming ‍‍‍	9	–	9	.500	21	–	25	.457
Colorado State ‍‍‍	7	–	11	.389	11	–	20	.355
Utah ‍‍‍	7	–	11	.389	11	–	20	.355
Southern
No. 2 Arizona State ^{x‡y} ‍‍‍	16	–	1	.941	59	–	8	.881
No. 28 Arizona ‍‍‍	15	–	5	.750	37	–	16	.698
New Mexico ‍‍‍	4	–	13	.235	28	–	17	.622
UTEP ‍‍‍	2	–	16	.111	18	–	27	.400
x – Division champion ‡ – Championship series champion y – Invited to the NCAA tournament As of June 30, 1973; Rankings from Collegiate Baseball

== College World Series ==
The 1973 season marked the twenty seventh NCAA baseball tournament, which culminated with the eight team College World Series. The College World Series was held in Omaha, Nebraska. The eight teams played a double-elimination format, with Southern California claiming their ninth championship, and fourth in a row, with a 4–3 win over Arizona State in the final.

Upper round 1
Minnesota	1
Oklahoma	0
Arizona State	3
Penn State	1
Texas	6
Georgia Southern	3
Southern California	4
Harvard	1

Upper round 2
Minnesota	0
Arizona State	3
Texas	1
Southern California	4
Lower round 1
Oklahoma	6
Penn State	0
Georgia Southern	8
Harvard	0

Upper final
Arizona State	1
Southern California	3
Lower round 2
Texas	10
Oklahoma	2
Minnesota	6
Georgia Southern	2

Semifinals
Southern California	8
Minnesota	7
Arizona State	6
Texas	5

Final
Southern California	4
Arizona State	3
