= Randy Johnson (designated hitter) =

American baseball player (born 1958)

- Designated hitter
- Born: August 15, 1958 (age 68); Miami, Florida, U.S.
- Batted: Left Threw: Left

MLB debut
- July 5, 1980, for the Chicago White Sox

Last MLB appearance
- October 3, 1982, for the Minnesota Twins

MLB statistics
- Batting average: .244
- Home runs: 10
- Runs batted in: 36
- Stats at Baseball Reference

Teams
- Chicago White Sox (1980); Minnesota Twins (1982)

Randall Stuart Johnson (born August 15, 1958) is an American former Major League Baseball designated hitter. He batted and threw left-handed and was roughly 6 foot 2 and 195 pounds during his playing career. Randy was drafted by the Chicago White Sox in the 3rd round of the 1979 draft. In 1980 for the Chicago White Sox he had 4 hits in 20 at bats (a .200 batting average). In 1982 with the Minnesota Twins, Johnson had 58 hits and 10 home runs. In his career, he had 62 hits, 10 home runs, 36 RBIs, and a .244 batting average.
