= Dewey Robinson (baseball) =

American baseball player (born 1955)

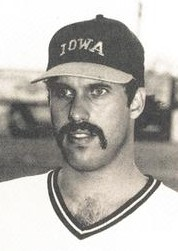

Pittsburgh Pirates
- Pitcher / Coach
- Born: April 28, 1955 (age 71); Evanston, Illinois, U.S.
- Batted: Right Threw: Right

MLB debut
- April 6, 1979, for the Chicago White Sox

Last MLB appearance
- October 4, 1981, for the Chicago White Sox

MLB statistics
- Win–loss record: 2–2
- Earned run average: 4.05
- Innings pitched: 53 1/3
- Stats at Baseball Reference

Teams
- As player: Chicago White Sox (1979–1981); As coach: Pittsburgh Pirates (2022–present)

Dewey Everett Robinson (born April 28, 1955) is an American former professional baseball right-handed relief pitcher and current coach, who played in Major League Baseball (MLB) for the Chicago White Sox (1979–81), where he appeared in 30 games. During his playing days, he stood 6 feet (1.8 m) tall, weighing 180 pounds (82 kg).

Robinson spent four seasons as a bullpen coach and pitching coach in the Major leagues for the White Sox and Houston Astros. He currently serves in a coaching capacity for the Pittsburgh Pirates Minor League Baseball (MiLB) organization.

== Playing career ==
A native of Evanston, Illinois, Robinson attended Southern Illinois University Carbondale. In 1975, he played collegiate summer baseball with the Chatham A's of the Cape Cod Baseball League. Robinson was selected by the White Sox in the 19th round (467th overall) of the 1977 Major League Baseball draft. After a sparkling 1978 season as a relief pitcher for the Class A Appleton Foxes — 50 games pitched, a 10–3 win–loss record, with 17 saves, 121 strikeouts and a 1.72 earned run average (ERA), in 89 innings pitched — he made the 1979 ChiSox' opening day roster. But he was ineffective in two trials and 11 games with Chicago that season, losing his only decision and posting an ERA of 6.28. In between those stints, however, Robinson had a good season for the Triple-A Iowa Oaks, winning 13 games in relief.

Following Robinson's success at Iowa with a strong 3 1/2 months to begin 1980, he was recalled to the ChiSox in July and pitched well in middle relief. In 15 games through the end of September, Robinson split two decisions and allowed only 26 hits in 35 innings pitched, with an ERA of 3.09. But in 1981, he appeared in only 29 professional games, including four with the White Sox, to conclude his MLB career. However, Robinson's last appearance in the big leagues — on October 4 — was a memorable one. Entering the game in the ninth inning at Comiskey Park with the White Sox trailing the Minnesota Twins 12–9, Robinson pitched a scoreless inning. Then, when the White Sox rallied for four runs and a walk-off, 13–12 victory, Robinson was credited with the win.

All told, in 30 MLB games and 53 1/3 innings pitched, Robinson split four decisions, giving up 42 hits and 28 bases on balls, with 35 strikeouts, and a career ERA of 4.05. His MiLB playing career ended, following the 1982 season in the Pittsburgh Pirates' and Milwaukee Brewers' organizations.

== Coaching career ==
Robinson coached collegiately at Northwestern University (1982–83) and the University of Missouri (1984–86).

Robinson spent 10 seasons coaching in the Chicago White Sox farm system. He served two seasons as the White Sox' bullpen coach (1993–1994) and was also the pitching coach at Class A Peninsula of the Carolina League in 1987 and Class A Tampa in 1988. Robinson also served the White Sox as minor league pitching coordinator.

Robinson joined the Astros organization in 1997 and was named the club's "Player Development Man of the Year" in 1998. He worked as their pitching coach in 2008 and 2009, during Cecil Cooper's term as manager.

Robinson was not retained by the Astros following the 2009 season. That October, he agreed to become a minor league pitching instructor for the Rays. Prior to the 2020 baseball season, Robinson assumed the title of "Director, Pitching Development". Robinson spent 12 years as the director of pitching development for Tampa Bay. On December 28, 2021, Robinson was hired by the Pittsburgh Pirates organization to serve as a special advisor of pitching development, coaching, and player development.

== Personal life ==
Robinson holds a Bachelor of Science degree in finance from Southern Illinois University at Carbondale. He and his wife, Cindy, have two sons, Brett and Greg. Brett pitched for the Astros Short-Season Class A affiliate at Tri-City in 2007 after being drafted in the 27th round in June.

Preceded by Dave Wallace	Houston Astros pitching coach 2008–2009	Succeeded by Brad Arnsberg
