= 1973 Minnesota Golden Gophers baseball team =

American college baseball season

1973 Minnesota Golden Gophers baseball

Big Ten Conference

1973 College World Series, Lost
- Conference: Big Ten Conference
- Record: 31–16–2 (14–4 Big Ten)
- Head coach: Dick Siebert (26th season)
- Home stadium: Bierman Field

1973 Big Ten Conference baseball standings
	Conf.						Overall
Team	W		L		T	PCT	W		L		T	PCT
No. 3 Minnesota ‍†‍‍^{y}	14	–	4	–	0	.778	31	–	16	–	2	.653
Michigan ‍‍‍	12	–	6	–	0	.667	22	–	16	–	0	.579
Ohio State ‍‍‍	11	–	7	–	0	.611	22	–	14	–	1	.608
Wisconsin ‍‍‍	8	–	8	–	0	.500	10	–	14	–	0	.417
Michigan State ‍‍‍	9	–	9	–	0	.500	27	–	20	–	0	.574
Northwestern ‍‍‍	8	–	8	–	0	.500	28	–	12	–	0	.700
Illinois ‍‍‍	8	–	10	–	0	.444	21	–	13	–	0	.618
Indiana ‍‍‍	8	–	10	–	0	.444	20	–	16	–	0	.556
Iowa ‍‍‍	8	–	10	–	0	.444	16	–	14	–	1	.532
Purdue ‍‍‍	2	–	16	–	0	.111	8	–	26	–	0	.235
† – Conference champion y – Invited to the NCAA tournament As of June 30, 1973; Rankings from Collegiate Baseball

The 1973 Minnesota Golden Gophers baseball team represented the University of Minnesota in the 1973 NCAA University Division baseball season. The head coach was Dick Siebert, serving his 26th year.

The Golden Gophers lost the College World Series, defeated by the USC Trojans in the semi-finals.

== Roster ==
1973 Minnesota Golden Gophers baseball team
Players
Coaches

#	Pos.	Name	B/T	Height	Weight	Year	Home town
	INF	Chris Brown	/	—	—
	C	Jim Moldenhauer	L/R	6 ft 2 in (1.88 m)	190 lb (86 kg)	So
	OF	John Holm	/	—	—
	INF	Tim Grice	R/R	6 ft 0 in (1.83 m)	185 lb (84 kg)	Sr
	INF	Bruce Nordquist	/	—	—
	OF	Joe Comer	/	—	—
		Jon Walseth	/	—	—
	INF	Steve Shimek	/	—	—
	C	Tom Buettner	R/R	5 ft 11 in (1.8 m)	195 lb (88 kg)	Sr	St. Paul, Minnesota
	INF	Joe Kordosky	R/R	6 ft 2 in (1.88 m)	185 lb (84 kg)	So
	INF	Mike Fitzenberger	/	—	—
		Lindsay Hoyer	/	—	—
	P	Dennis Allar	/	—	—	Jr
	OF	Dave Borg	/	—	—
	OF	Bob Bjorklund	/	—	—		{{{home}}}
	OF	Jeff Hagen	/	—	—
	OF	John Dengel	/	—	—
	RHP	Steve Comer	S/R	6 ft 3 in (1.91 m)	195 lb (88 kg)	Fr	Minnetonka, Minnesota
	P	Tom Wolcyn	/	—	—
	P	Dan Forsythe	/	—	—
	P	Ken Herbst	/	—	—	So
	P	Ed Holtz	/	—	—
	P	Ed Erickson	/	—	—
	P	Mark Muska	/	—	—
	P	Gordon Peterson	/	—	—
	P	Bob Turnbull	/	—	—	Jr
31		Dave Winfield	R/R	6 ft 6 in (1.98 m)	220 lb (100 kg)	Sr	St. Paul, Minnesota

Head coach

Dick Siebert

Assistant coach(es)

Legend

- (C) Team captain
- (S) Suspended
- (I) Ineligible
- Injured
- Current redshirt

== Schedule ==
1973 Minnesota Golden Gophers baseball game log
Regular season
March (3–7)

#	Date	Opponent	Site/stadium	Score	Overall record	Big Ten record
1	March	at Trinity	Unknown • Unknown, Texas	7–6	1–0	0–0
2	March	at Trinity	Unknown • Unknown, Texas	3–5	1–1	0–0
3	March	at Texas Lutheran	Unknown • Unknown, Texas	13–4	2–1	0–0
4	March	at Texas Lutheran	Unknown • Unknown, Texas	17–0	3–1	0–0
5	March 26	at Texas	Clark Field • Austin, Texas	2–3	3–2	0–0
6	March 26	at Texas	Clark Field • Austin, Texas	8–13	3–3	0–0
7	March 27	at Texas A&M	Travis Field • College Station, Texas	2–3	3–4	0–0
8	March 27	at Texas A&M	Travis Field • College Station, Texas	1–4	3–5	0–0
9	March 28	at Texas A&M	Travis Field • College Station, Texas	3–4	3–6	0–0
10	March 28	at Texas A&M	Travis Field • College Station, Texas	2–3	3–7	0–0

April (11–7–2)

#	Date	Opponent	Site/stadium	Score	Overall record	Big Ten record
11	April	at Sam Houston State	Holleman Field • Huntsville, Texas	1–3	3–8	0–0
12	April	at Sam Houston State	Holleman Field • Huntsville, Texas	3–6	3–9	0–0
13	April	Augsburg	Bierman Field • Minneapolis, Minnesota	18–1	4–9	0–0
14	April	Augsburg	Bierman Field • Minneapolis, Minnesota	21–0	5–9	0–0
15	April	St. Cloud State	Bierman Field • Minneapolis, Minnesota	8–4	6–9	0–0
16	April	St. Cloud State	Bierman Field • Minneapolis, Minnesota	4–4	6–9–1	0–0
17	April	St. Olaf	Bierman Field • Minneapolis, Minnesota	8–0	7–9–1	0–0
18	April	St. Olaf	Bierman Field • Minneapolis, Minnesota	6–0	8–9–1	0–0
19	April	vs Iowa	Unknown • Unknown	14–4	9–9–1	1–0
20	April	vs Iowa	Unknown • Unknown	3–4	9–10–1	1–1
21	April	vs Winona State	Bierman Field • Minneapolis, Minnesota	3–4	9–11–1	1–1
22	April	vs Winona State	Bierman Field • Minneapolis, Minnesota	3–3	9–11–2	1–1
23	April 20	at Michigan	Ray Fisher Stadium • Ann Arbor, Michigan	6–2	10–11–2	2–1
24	April 20	at Michigan	Ray Fisher Stadium • Ann Arbor, Michigan	0–1	10–12–2	2–2
25	April 21	at Michigan State	John H. Kobs Field • East Lansing, Michigan	1–5	10–13–2	2–3
26	April 21	at Michigan State	John H. Kobs Field • East Lansing, Michigan	7–1	11–13–2	3–3
27	April 27	Indiana	Bierman Field • Minneapolis, Minnesota	6–4	12–13–2	4–3
28	April 27	Indiana	Bierman Field • Minneapolis, Minnesota	5–7	12–14–2	4–4
29	April 28	Ohio State	Bierman Field • Minneapolis, Minnesota	7–2	13–14–2	5–4
30	April 28	Ohio State	Bierman Field • Minneapolis, Minnesota	12–0	14–14–2	6–4

May (12–0)

#	Date	Opponent	Site/stadium	Score	Overall record	Big Ten record
31	May	at Northwestern	Wells Field • Evanston, Illinois	7–3	15–14–2	7–4
32	May	at Northwestern	Wells Field • Evanston, Illinois	8–6	16–14–2	8–4
33	May	at Wisconsin	Guy Lowman Field • Madison, Wisconsin	5–1	17–14–2	9–4
34	May	at Wisconsin	Guy Lowman Field • Madison, Wisconsin	6–0	18–14–2	10–4
35	May	Mankato State	Bierman Field • Minneapolis, Minnesota	7–0	19–14–2	9–4
36	May	Mankato State	Bierman Field • Minneapolis, Minnesota	11–0	20–14–2	10–4
37	May	Wisconsin–La Crosse	Bierman Field • Minneapolis, Minnesota	2–0	21–14–2	10–4
38	May	Wisconsin–La Crosse	Bierman Field • Minneapolis, Minnesota	14–3	22–14–2	10–4
39	May 18	Purdue	Bierman Field • Minneapolis, Minnesota	7–0	23–14–2	11–4
40	May 18	Purdue	Bierman Field • Minneapolis, Minnesota	15–4	24–14–2	12–4
41	May 19	Illinois	Bierman Field • Minneapolis, Minnesota	7–6	25–14–2	13–4
42	May 19	Illinois	Bierman Field • Minneapolis, Minnesota	10–3	26–14–2	14–4

Postseason
District IV Tournament (3–0)

#	Date	Opponent	Site/stadium	Score	Overall record	Big Ten record
43	May 31	vs Miami (OH)	Abe Martin Field • Carbondale, Illinois	3–2	27–14–2	14–4
44	June 1	at Southern Illinois	Abe Martin Field • Carbondale, Illinois	2–0	28–14–2	14–4
45	June 3	at Southern Illinois	Abe Martin Field • Carbondale, Illinois	7–6	29–14–2	14–4

1973 College World Series (2–2)

#	Date	Opponent	Site/stadium	Score	Overall record	Big Ten record
46	June 8	vs Oklahoma	Johnny Rosenblatt Stadium • Omaha, Nebraska	1–0	30–14–2	14–4
47	June 10	vs Arizona State	Johnny Rosenblatt Stadium • Omaha, Nebraska	0–3	30–15–2	14–4
48	June 11	vs Georgia Southern	Johnny Rosenblatt Stadium • Omaha, Nebraska	6–2	31–15–2	14–4
49	June 12	vs USC	Johnny Rosenblatt Stadium • Omaha, Nebraska	7–8	31–16–2	14–4

== Awards and honors ==
Tim Grice

- First Team All-Big Ten

Dave Winfield

- First Team All-Big Ten
- College World Series Most Outstanding Player
