= Mark Esser =

American baseball player (1956–2025)

- Pitcher
- Born: April 1, 1956; Erie, Pennsylvania, U.S.
- Died: May 12, 2025 (aged 69)
- Batted: Right Threw: Left

MLB debut
- April 22, 1979, for the Chicago White Sox

Last MLB appearance
- April 29, 1979, for the Chicago White Sox

MLB statistics
- Win–loss record: 0–0
- Earned run average: 16.20
- Strikeouts: 1
- Stats at Baseball Reference

Teams
- Chicago White Sox (1979)

Mark Gerald Esser (April 1, 1956 – May 12, 2025) was an American professional baseball pitcher. He appeared in only two games in Major League Baseball, one week apart, in 1979 for the Chicago White Sox.

== Early life ==
Esser was born in Erie, Pennsylvania, in 1956 and moved to Poughkeepsie, New York, in 1965. He attended Roy C. Ketcham High School in Wappinger, New York, where he played baseball and basketball. Esser was drafted by the Baltimore Orioles in the 20th round of the 1975 MLB draft, but opted to play college baseball for Miami-Dade North Junior College.

== Baseball career ==
The Chicago White Sox drafted Esser in the eighth round of the 1977 MLB January Draft-Regular Phase. He spilt the minor league season between the Rookie League Gulf Coast League White Sox and the Single A Appleton Foxes, where his teammates included future Hall-of-Famer Harold Baines. Esser then enjoyed a standout season in 1978 in Appleton, amassing a 9–2 record and seven saves pitching out of the bullpen in relief for a staff that featured future White Sox starting pitchers Britt Burns, Ross Baumgarten, and LaMarr Hoyt. Appleton would win the Midwest League title with 97–40 record and Esser was picked for the All-Star team.

Esser made his Major League debut on April 22, 1979, against the Cleveland Indians at Cleveland Stadium. He pitched 1.1 scoreless innings in relief of Francisco Barrios. Seven days later, he pitched in the second and final Major League game of his career. Esser faced four Texas Rangers batters at Comiskey Park and retired only one of them, allowing three earned runs on one hit and two walks. Esser spent the rest of the season pitching for the Triple A Iowa Oaks. The Sox converted Esser to a starter in 1980 and he went 10–12 pitching at three levels in the Chicago farm system.

On August 2, 1982, he and Bill Atkinson combined to throw a no-hitter for the Glens Falls White Sox. It would be Esser's final season in professional baseball.

== Personal life and death ==
Esser was inducted into the Dutchess County Baseball Hall of Fame Association in 2023.

Esser died on May 12, 2025, at the age of 69.
