= 1973 Texas Longhorns baseball team =

American college baseball season

1973 Texas Longhorns baseball

SWC champions

College World Series, 2–2
- Conference: Southwest Conference
- Record: 50–7 (15–3 SWC)
- Head coach: Cliff Gustafson (6th year)
- Home stadium: Clark Field

1973 Southwest Conference baseball standings
	Conf.				Overall
Team	W		L	PCT	W		L	PCT
No. 4 Texas ‍†‍‍^{y}	15	–	3	.833	50	–	7	.877
TCU ‍‍‍	12	–	7	.632	31	–	12	.721
Texas A&M ‍‍‍	9	–	8	.529	19	–	9	.679
Baylor ‍‍‍	9	–	9	.500	21	–	17	.553
Houston ‍‍‍	8	–	11	.421	15	–	16	.484
Rice ‍‍‍	6	–	10	.375	16	–	14	.533
Texas Tech ‍‍‍	6	–	10	.375	12	–	16	.429
SMU ‍‍‍	5	–	12	.294	10	–	18	.357
† – Conference champion y – Invited to the NCAA tournament As of June 30, 1973; Rankings from Collegiate Baseball

The 1973 Texas Longhorns baseball team represented the University of Texas at Austin in the 1973 NCAA University Division baseball season. The Longhorns played their home games at Clark Field. The team was coached by Cliff Gustafson in his 6th season at Texas.

The Longhorns reached the College World Series, finishing tied for third with wins over Georgia Southern and Oklahoma and losses to eventual champion Southern California and runner-up Arizona State.

== Personnel ==
=== Roster ===
1973 Texas Longhorns roster
Pitchers: 8 - Martin Flores; 10 - Ron Roznovsky; 17 - Zane Grubbs; 21 - Jim Gideon; 24 - Rich Wortham; - Robert Cuellar; - Doyle Moore; Catchers: 16 - Steve Michael Clancy; 19 - Bill Berryhill	Infielders: 3 - Ken Pape; 6 - Bobby Clark; 30 - Keith Moreland; - Tom Cusick; Outfielders: 2 - Rudy Jaramillo; 4 - Terry Pyka; 7 - Rick Burley; 13 - Tom Ball	Unknown: 11 - Gary Stephen Peterson; 14 - Charlie E. Crenshaw; - Michael Anderson; - James Bradley; - James Brown; - Randolph Bryant; - Doug Helton; - Alan Lowry; - Juan Olvera; - Russell Pounds; - Terry Ray; - James Reeves; - Spanky Stevens; - Blair Stouffer; - Jerry Wheat

== Schedule and results ==
Legend
Texas win
Texas loss
Tie

1973 Texas Longhorns baseball game log
Regular season

February
Date	Opponent	Site/stadium	Score	Overall record	SWC record
Feb 23	Sam Houston State*	Clark Field • Austin, TX	L 0–5	0–1	
Feb 23	Sam Houston State*	Clark Field • Austin, TX	L 2–9	0–2	
Feb 24	Sam Houston State*	Clark Field • Austin, TX	W 3–0	1–2	
Feb 24	Sam Houston State*	Clark Field • Austin, TX	W 5–2	2–2	
Feb 27	Texas Lutheran*	Clark Field • Austin, TX	W 6–0	3–2	
Feb 27	Texas Lutheran*	Clark Field • Austin, TX	W 4–1 (Note: Ron Roznovsky threw a no-hitter.)	4–2	

March
Date	Opponent	Site/stadium	Score	Overall record	SWC record
Mar 2	Lamar*	Clark Field • Austin, TX	W 7–2	5–2	
Mar 2	Lamar*	Clark Field • Austin, TX	W 9–0	6–2	
Mar 3	Dallas Baptist*	Clark Field • Austin, TX	W 5–1	7–2	
Mar 3	Dallas Baptist*	Clark Field • Austin, TX	W 13–3	8–2	
Mar 6	St. Mary's*	Clark Field • Austin, TX	W 1–0	9–2	
Mar 6	St. Mary's*	Clark Field • Austin, TX	W 10–0	10–2	
Mar 9	Southwestern Louisiana*	Clark Field • Austin, TX	W 4–1	11–2	
Mar 9	Southwestern Louisiana*	Clark Field • Austin, TX	W 12–1	12–2	
Mar 10	Southwestern Louisiana*	Clark Field • Austin, TX	W 4–1	13–2	
Mar 10	Southwestern Louisiana*	Clark Field • Austin, TX	W 9–0	14–2	
Mar 16	TCU	Clark Field • Austin, TX	W 4–3^{11}	15–2	1–0
Mar 16	TCU	Clark Field • Austin, TX	W 9–4	16–2	2–0
Mar 17	TCU	Clark Field • Austin, TX	W 4–0	17–2	3–0
Mar 19	Trinity*	Clark Field • Austin, TX	W 2–0	18–2	
Mar 19	Trinity*	Clark Field • Austin, TX	W 9–3	19–2	
Mar 23	at Baylor	Waco, TX	W 7–2^{8}	20–2	4–0
Mar 23	at Baylor	Waco, TX	L 2–3	20–3	4–1
Mar 24	at Baylor	Waco, TX	W 8–4	21–3	5–1
Mar 26	Minnesota*	Clark Field • Austin, TX	W 3–2	22–3	
Mar 26	Minnesota*	Clark Field • Austin, TX	W 13–8	23–3	
Mar 30	at Houston	Cougar Field • Houston, TX	W 3–1	24–3	6–1
Mar 30	at Houston	Cougar Field • Houston, TX	W 11–5	25–3	7–1
Mar 31	at Houston	Cougar Field • Houston, TX	L 1–2	25–4	7–2

April
Date	Opponent	Site/stadium	Score	Overall record	SWC record
Apr 3	at St. Mary's*	San Antonio, TX	W 10–1	26–4	
Apr 3	at St. Mary's*	San Antonio, TX	W 15–3	27–4	
Apr 7	Texas Tech	Clark Field • Austin, TX	W 6–2	28–4	8–2
Apr 7	Texas Tech	Clark Field • Austin, TX	W 9–0 (Note: Richard Wortham threw a no-hitter.)	29–4	9–2
Apr 10	at Texas Lutheran*	Seguin, TX	W 7–1	30–4	
Apr 10	at Texas Lutheran*	Seguin, TX	W 10–1	31–4	
Apr 13	at SMU	Dallas, TX	W 21–4	32–4	10–2
Apr 20	Rice	Clark Field • Austin, TX	W 3–2	33–4	11–2
Apr 21	Rice	Clark Field • Austin, TX	W 13–1	34–4	12–2
Apr 21	Rice	Clark Field • Austin, TX	W 10–8	35–4	13–2
Apr 27	at Texas A&M	Kyle Baseball Field • College Park, TX	L 0–1	35–5	13–3
Apr 27	at Texas A&M	Kyle Baseball Field • College Park, TX	W 3–1	36–5	14–3
Apr 28	at Texas A&M	Kyle Baseball Field • College Park, TX	W 6–4	37–5	15–3

May
Date	Opponent	Site/stadium	Score	Overall record	SWC record
May 5	Southwestern*	Clark Field • Austin, TX	W 9–3	38–5	
May 5	Southwestern*	Clark Field • Austin, TX	W 6–0	39–5	
May 7	Southwestern*	Clark Field • Austin, TX	W 5–1	40–5	
May 7	Southwestern*	Clark Field • Austin, TX	W 21–6	41–5	
May 11	Sam Houston State*	Clark Field • Austin, TX	W 4–0	42–5	
May 11	Sam Houston State*	Clark Field • Austin, TX	W 8–2	43–5	
May 12	Sam Houston State*	Clark Field • Austin, TX	W 8–2	44–5	
May 12	Sam Houston State*	Clark Field • Austin, TX	W 12–4	45–5	

Postseason

District 6 playoffs
Date	Opponent	Site/stadium	Score	Overall record	NCAAT record
May 24	Texas–Pan American	San Antonio, TX	W 7–1	46–5	1–0
May 26	Trinity	San Antonio, TX	W 17–2	47–5	2–0
May 27	Texas–Pan American	San Antonio, TX	W 14–12^{10}	48–5	3–0

College World Series
Date	Opponent	Site/stadium	Score	Overall record	CWS record
June 9	Georgia Southern	Johnny Rosenblatt Stadium • Omaha, NE	W 6–3	49–5	1–0
June 10	Southern California	Johnny Rosenblatt Stadium • Omaha, NE	L 1–4	49–6	1–1
June 12	Oklahoma	Johnny Rosenblatt Stadium • Omaha, NE	W 10–2	50–6	2–1
June 14	Arizona State	Johnny Rosenblatt Stadium • Omaha, NE	L 5–6	50–7	2–2
