= Leo Sutherland =

Cuban baseball player (born 1958)

- Outfielder
- Born: April 6, 1958 (age 67); Santiago de Cuba, Cuba
- Batted: Left Threw: Left

MLB debut
- August 11, 1980, for the Chicago White Sox

Last MLB appearance
- October 4, 1981, for the Chicago White Sox

MLB statistics
- Batting average: .248
- Home runs: 0
- Runs batted in: 5
- Stats at Baseball Reference

Teams
- Chicago White Sox (1980–1981)

Leonardo Sutherland Cantin (born April 6, 1958) is a Cuban-born former professional baseball player, an outfielder who appeared in 45 in Major League Baseball games for the 1980–1981 Chicago White Sox. He threw and batted left-handed, stood 5 feet 10 inches (1.78 m) tall and weighed 165 pounds (75 kg).

Sutherland attended Santiago High School in Garden Grove, California, and Golden West College in Huntington Beach. The White Sox selected Sutherland in the first round (third overall) in the secondary phase of the 1976 January draft.

He made his debut with the White Sox in August 1980, after almost five seasons in the Chicago farm system. In his first game August 11 against the New York Yankees at Yankee Stadium, he singled in his first Major League at bat and went two for three with a stolen base. The following day, he went three for five with a run batted in. On August 20, his one-out single in the ninth broke up a no-hit bid by Dan Spillner of the Cleveland Indians. He played in 34 games during the season's final two months, including 23 starts in the outfield, and batted .258 with four RBI and four stolen bases. He then spent the entire 1981 minor league season with the Triple-A Edmonton Trappers before his recall in September. In 11 games played, most of them as a pinch runner, he scored six runs but batted only 12 times with two hits. He played one final season of minor league baseball with Edmonton in 1982 before leaving the game.

Sutherland stole more than 30 bases in six of his seven pro seasons. In the Majors, his 25 hits included three doubles, and he stole six bases in eight attempts.
