= Ricky Seilheimer =

American baseball player (born 1960)

- Catcher
- Born: August 30, 1960 (age 66); Brenham, Texas, U.S.
- Batted: Left Threw: Right

MLB debut
- July 5, 1980, for the Chicago White Sox

Last MLB appearance
- August 8, 1980, for the Chicago White Sox

MLB statistics
- Batting average: .212
- Home runs: 1
- Runs batted in: 3
- Stats at Baseball Reference

Teams
- Chicago White Sox (1980)

Ricky Allen Seilheimer (/ˈsaɪʌlhaɪmər/ SYUL-hy-mər; born August 30, 1960) is an American former professional baseball catcher. He was selected by the Chicago White Sox in the first round of the 1979 Major League Baseball draft.Seilheimer made his Major League Baseball (MLB) debut in 1980 at the age of 19, making him the youngest player in the major leagues at that time. During his brief MLB career, he hit one home run notably off future Hall of Fame pitcher Ferguson Jenkins. Although he continued to play with the White Sox organization until 1986, he never again played in the major leagues after 1980.

== Sources ==
- Career statistics from Baseball Reference · Baseball Reference (Minors) · Retrosheet · Baseball Almanac
