= Harry Chappas =

American baseball player (1957–2024)

- Shortstop
- Born: October 26, 1957; Mount Rainier, Maryland, U.S.
- Died: September 15, 2024 (aged 66)
- Batted: Both Threw: Right

MLB debut
- September 7, 1978, for the Chicago White Sox

Last MLB appearance
- June 13, 1980, for the Chicago White Sox

MLB statistics
- At bats: 184
- Home runs: 1
- Runs batted in: 12
- Stats at Baseball Reference

Teams
- Chicago White Sox (1978–1980)

Harry Perry Chappas (October 26, 1957 – September 15, 2024) was an American baseball player who was a shortstop with the Chicago White Sox in parts of three seasons, from 1978 until 1980. Though he appeared in only 72 career games, he became a cult hero on the South Side due primarily to his stature. Chappas was measured by Harry Caray and publicly declared to be 5 ft 3 in (1.60 m), an inch or two shorter than established star Freddie Patek. He was one of the shortest players in Major League history, although Chappas stated in an interview in Sports Illustrated that he was closer to 5 ft 5 in (1.65 m), and implied that team owner Bill Veeck exaggerated his short stature for publicity reasons.

Chappas' professional baseball career began with the barnstorming ex-Negro league Indianapolis Clowns, who had become racially integrated, and had developed into more of an entertainment product than a competitive team. When Chappas later made his major league debut, he became the final player and first white player to make the major leagues from a team formerly a member of the Negro leagues.

Chappas signed with the White Sox in 1976 as a sixth round draft pick. He impressed Veeck with good performances for the Appleton Foxes in 1978. This earned Chappas a September callup, during which he hit an effective .267 in 20 games.

Primarily due to his height, he gained more and more national interest, highlighted by an appearance on the cover of Sports Illustrated during spring training in 1979. In spring training that year, Chappas unseated veteran Don Kessinger and became the opening day shortstop. He lost his job after two weeks after missing a sign as a baserunner, only returning in September. Chappas made the opening day roster the following year as well, but only as a reserve player, and he was subsequently sent to the minors after hitting .160 in 50 at bats.

Overall, Chappas hit .245 in the majors and hit a single home run, off the Brewers' Bill Travers, in 1979.

Chappas died on September 15, 2024, at the age of 66.
