= Nardi Contreras =

American baseball player and coach (born 1951)

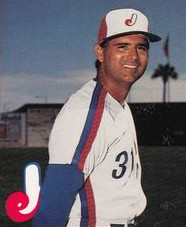
- Contreras in 1988
- Pitcher
- Born: September 19, 1951 (age 74); Tampa, Florida, U.S.
- Batted: Switch Threw: Right

MLB debut
- May 23, 1980, for the Chicago White Sox

Last MLB appearance
- October 1, 1980, for the Chicago White Sox

MLB statistics
- Win–loss record: 0–0
- Strikeouts: 8
- Earned run average: 5.93
- Stats at Baseball Reference

Teams
- As player: Chicago White Sox (1980); As coach: New York Yankees (1995); Seattle Mariners (1997–1998); Chicago White Sox (1998–2002)

Arnaldo Juan Contreras (born September 19, 1951) is an American former professional baseball pitcher and coach. His brief time in Major League Baseball, as well as the majority of his time as a coach, came with the Chicago White Sox. He currently serves as minor league pitching coordinator for the New York Yankees.

== Playing career ==
=== With the Reds ===
Contreras was drafted at the age of 17, selected in the 12th round of the 1969 Major League Baseball draft by the Cincinnati Reds. He began his career as a starting pitcher, pitching in the Reds' organization for four seasons, never rising above Class A ball.

=== With the Mets ===
Following the 1972 season, Contreras was drafted from the Reds by the New York Mets. The Mets moved him steadily up the minor league ladder over the next three seasons, and Contreras reached Triple-A with the Tidewater Tides in 1975. That season, his first full season as a relief pitcher, he posted an impressive 1.95 ERA in 60 innings. Still, the Mets released him during spring training in 1976.

=== With the Phillies ===
Ten days after his release by the Mets, Contreras signed a minor league contract with the Philadelphia Phillies. He split the next two seasons between the Phillies' Double-A affiliate in Reading and their Triple-A club in Oklahoma City. In 1977, Contreras was moved back into Reading's starting rotation for part of the season, going 6–5 with a 3.23 ERA. Once again, however, Contreras was released during spring training in 1979.

=== With the White Sox ===
Contreras signed with the White Sox in May, and was assigned to the Triple-A Iowa Oaks. Once more used mostly as a starter, his numbers were not as impressive in 1979. Although he won more than he lost at 7–6, his ERA shot up to 5.97. He returned to Iowa in 1980, this time posting better numbers (9-7, 4.19 ERA in 20 games, all as a starter), and got his first, and what would prove to be his only, shot at the major leagues.

Although he had been a starter in the minors in 1980, the White Sox used Contreras exclusively as a reliever during his two brief stints in the majors. He appeared in a total of eight games, with no wins or losses and a 5.93 ERA. Contreras was generally used as a mopup man, and the White Sox lost each of the eight games in which Contreras appeared.

=== Post-major leagues ===
Contreras returned to the minors for the White Sox, pitching sparingly over the next two seasons for their new Triple-A affiliate, the Edmonton Trappers. Contreras appeared in 11 games in 1981 and just one in 1982. Contreras was out of organized ball for the next several years. He resurfaced in 1989, pitching briefly for the St. Petersburg Pelicans of the short-lived Senior Professional Baseball Association.

== Coaching ==
Following his playing career, Contreras served as a coach in several major league organizations, including a few at the major league level. He was the pitching coach for the New York Yankees in 1995, the Seattle Mariners in 1997–98, and then with the team that gave him his shot at the majors, the White Sox, from 1998 until 2002. In 2005, he returned to the Yankees organization, where he currently serves as their minor league pitching coordinator. He gained recognition for developing pitch count guidelines—styled "Joba rules"—for Joba Chamberlain.
