= Greg Pryor =

American baseball player (born 1949)

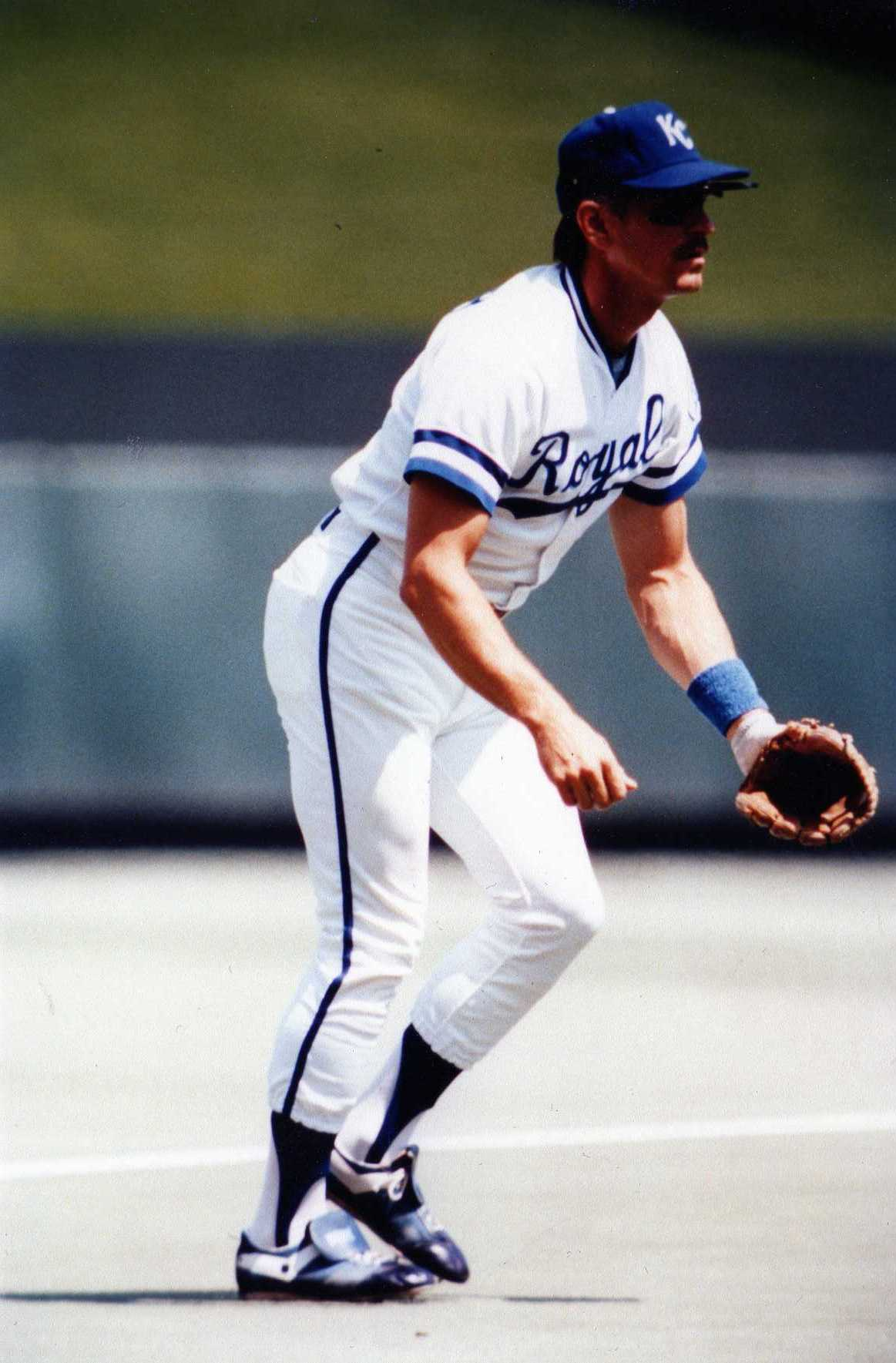
- Fielding for the Royals in 1985
- Infielder
- Born: October 2, 1949 (age 76); Marietta, Ohio, U.S.
- Batted: Right Threw: Right

MLB debut
- June 4, 1976, for the Texas Rangers

Last MLB appearance
- September 30, 1986, for the Kansas City Royals

MLB statistics
- Batting average: .250
- Home runs: 14
- Runs batted in: 146
- Stats at Baseball Reference

Teams
- Texas Rangers (1976); Chicago White Sox (1978–1981); Kansas City Royals (1982–1986)

Career highlights and awards
- World Series champion (1985)

Gregory Russell Pryor (born October 2, 1949) is an American former Major League Baseball infielder. He played all or part of ten seasons in the majors, in 1976 and 1978–1986. He was 6'0 feet tall and weighed 185 pounds. He batted right and threw right handed.

== Major league career ==
Originally drafted by the Washington Senators, Pryor was picked in the 6th round of the 1971 amateur draft (130th overall) and was the last position player draft pick of the Senators to play in the major leagues. He debuted in the majors with the Senators' later incarnation, the Texas Rangers, in 1976. Pryor was a member of the World Series-winning Kansas City Royals in 1985.

Greg's father, George, was a fullback at Wake Forest University and played for the Baltimore Colts of the NFL.
