= Eddie Bane =

American baseball player (born 1952)

- Pitcher
- Born: March 22, 1952 (age 74); Great Lakes, Illinois, U.S.
- Batted: Right Threw: Left

MLB debut
- July 4, 1973, for the Minnesota Twins

Last MLB appearance
- September 12, 1976, for the Minnesota Twins

MLB statistics
- Win–loss record: 7–13
- Earned run average: 4.66
- Strikeouts: 80
- Stats at Baseball Reference

Teams
- Minnesota Twins (1973, 1975–1976)

Member of the National College

Baseball Hall of Fame
- Induction: 2008
Medals
Men's baseball
Representing United States
Pan American Games
Silver medal – second place	1971 Cali	Team

Edward Norman Bane (born March 22, 1952) is an American former professional baseball pitcher and executive, who played from 1973 to 1976 for the Minnesota Twins of Major League Baseball (MLB).

== Career ==
Bane attended Westminster High School then Arizona State University, where he pitched on the school's baseball team. He was a member of the United States national baseball team that won the silver medal at the 1971 Pan American Games. He was named to the 1973 College Baseball All-America Team and was elected to the National College Baseball Hall of Fame in 2008. He was a first-round selection in the 1973 Major League Baseball draft. He made his professional debut on July 4 with the Twins without spending any time in the minor leagues. That season, he pitched in 23 games, winning none and losing five. He also spent parts of 1975 and 1976 with the Twins. He made his final major league appearance on September 12, 1976.

From 1974 to 1977, he primarily played for the Tacoma Twins, the team's AAA minor league affiliate. He played in the minor leagues until 1980, winning 49 career games at that level.

He had a career Major League win–loss record of 7–13 with a 4.66 earned run average in 44 appearances and 168 innings pitched, allowing 182 hits and 84 bases on balls. He also notched 80 strikeouts, two saves and one complete game.

Bane has held several positions since retiring as a player, including special assistant to the GM for the Tampa Bay Devil Rays (1999–2003), and scouting director for the Los Angeles Angels of Anaheim (2004–2010). He is currently serving as the special assistant to the general manager with the Boston Red Sox, appointed on October 3, 2012.

He was awarded the George Genovese Lifetime Achievement Award in Scouting on January 14, 2017.

He is the brother of Dan Bane, the CEO of the retailer Trader Joe's, and his son Jaymie is a major league scout with the Red Sox. His daughter, Veronica Bane is a USA Today bestselling novelist who published the book Difficult Girls in July 2025. Bane is a fan of author Vince Flynn saying, "Vince could write a coloring book and I would read it."

== See also ==
- List of baseball players who went directly to Major League Baseball
