= 1973 Penn State Nittany Lions baseball team =

American college baseball season

1973 Penn State Nittany Lions baseball

College World Series, T-7th
- Conference: Independent
- Record: 19–7
- Head coach: Chuck Bedlar (11th season)
- Assistant coaches: Kepler; Smith
- Captains: Jerry Micsky; Rick Sherkel
- Home stadium: New Beaver Field

The 1973 Penn State Nittany Lions baseball team represented Pennsylvania State University in the 1973 NCAA University Division baseball season. The head coach was Chuck Bedlar, serving his 11th year.

The Nittany Lions lost in the College World Series, defeated by the Oklahoma Sooners.

== Roster ==
1973 Penn State Nittany Lions baseball team
Players
Coaches

| # | Pos. | Name | B/T | Height | Weight | Year | Home town |
|---|---|---|---|---|---|---|---|
| | | Bruce Baney | / | — | — |
| | | Len Bartek | / | — | — |
| | | Gary Bartley | / | — | — |
| | | Kevin Burke | / | — | — |
| | | Steve Correll | / | — | — |
| | | George Coval | / | — | — |
| | | Dennie DeWitt | / | — | — |
| | | Paul Karwaski | / | — | — |
| | | Garry Koch | / | — | — |
| | | Lou Korb | / | — | — |
| | | Mitch Lukevics | / | — | — |
| | | Brian Masella | / | — | — |
| | | Arthur Ochs | / | — | — |
| | | Don Stine | / | — | — |
| | | John Tekeley | / | — | — |
| | | Greg Vogel | / | — | — |
| | | Jim Wech | / | — | — |

Head coach

Chuck Medlar

Assistant coach(es)

Kepler
Smith

Legend

- (C) Team captain
- (S) Suspended
- (I) Ineligible
- Injured
- Current redshirt

== Schedule ==
1973 Penn State Nittany Lions baseball game log
Regular season
March (1–1)

| # | Date | Opponent | Site/stadium | Score | Overall record |
|---|---|---|---|---|---|
| 1 | May 29 | at William & Mary | Unknown • Williamsburg, Virginia | 1–3 | 0–1 |
| 2 | May 29 | at William & Mary | Unknown • Williamsburg, Virginia | 2–1 | 1–1 |

April (9–2)

| # | Date | Opponent | Site/stadium | Score | Overall record |
|---|---|---|---|---|---|
| 3 | April 7 | Villanova | Beaver Field • University Park, Pennsylvania | 6–5 | 2–1 |
| 4 | April 11 | Lafayette | Beaver Field • University Park, Pennsylvania | 8–7 | 3–1 |
| 5 | April 14 | at Rutgers | Unknown • Piscataway, New Jersey | 3–4 | 3–2 |
| 6 | April 14 | at Rutgers | Unknown • Piscataway, New Jersey | 8–0 | 4–2 |
| 7 | April 17 | Bucknell | Beaver Field • University Park, Pennsylvania | 5–2 | 5–2 |
| 8 | April 20 | Dickinson | Beaver Field • University Park, Pennsylvania | 22–3 | 6–2 |
| 9 | April 21 | at Georgetown | Unknown • Washington, D. C. | 6–4 | 7–2 |
| 10 | April 24 | West Virginia | Beaver Field • University Park, Pennsylvania | 12–0 | 8–2 |
| 11 | April 26 | at Gettysburg | Unknown • Gettysburg, Pennsylvania | 4–3 | 9–2 |
| 12 | April 29 | at Rider | Unknown • Lawrenceville, New Jersey | 0–10 | 9–3 |
| 13 | April 29 | at Rider | Unknown • Lawrenceville, New Jersey | 6–0 | 10–3 |

May (6–2)

| # | Date | Opponent | Site/stadium | Score | Overall record |
|---|---|---|---|---|---|
| 14 | May 4 | Delaware | Beaver Field • University Park, Pennsylvania | 8–0 | 11–3 |
| 15 | May 6 | Temple | Beaver Field • University Park, Pennsylvania | 1–3 | 11–4 |
| 16 | May 6 | Temple | Beaver Field • University Park, Pennsylvania | 3–2 | 12–4 |
| 17 | May 9 | Juniata | Beaver Field • University Park, Pennsylvania | 17–6 | 13–4 |
| 18 | May 13 | Buffalo | Beaver Field • University Park, Pennsylvania | 17–0 | 14–4 |
| 19 | May 13 | Buffalo | Beaver Field • University Park, Pennsylvania | 6–0 | 15–4 |
| 20 | May 16 | at IUP | Unknown • Indiana, Pennsylvania | 6–0 | 16–4 |
| 21 | May 16 | at IUP | Unknown • Indiana, Pennsylvania | 0–2 | 16–5 |

Postseason
District II Tournament (3–0)

| # | Date | Opponent | Site/stadium | Score | Overall record |
|---|---|---|---|---|---|
| 22 | May 26 | vs Seton Hall | Unknown • West Windsor, New Jersey | 5–3 | 17–5 |
| 23 | May 26 | vs Buffalo | Unknown • West Windsor, New Jersey | 3–1 | 18–5 |
| 24 | May 26 | vs Temple | Unknown • West Windsor, New Jersey | 4–2 | 19–5 |

1973 College World Series (0–2)

| # | Date | Opponent | Site/stadium | Score | Overall record |
|---|---|---|---|---|---|
| 25 | June 8 | vs Arizona State | Johnny Rosenblatt Stadium • Omaha, Nebraska | 1–3 | 19–6 |
| 26 | June 9 | vs Oklahoma | Johnny Rosenblatt Stadium • Omaha, Nebraska | 0–6 | 19–7 |
