= Dennis Littlejohn =

American baseball player (born 1954)

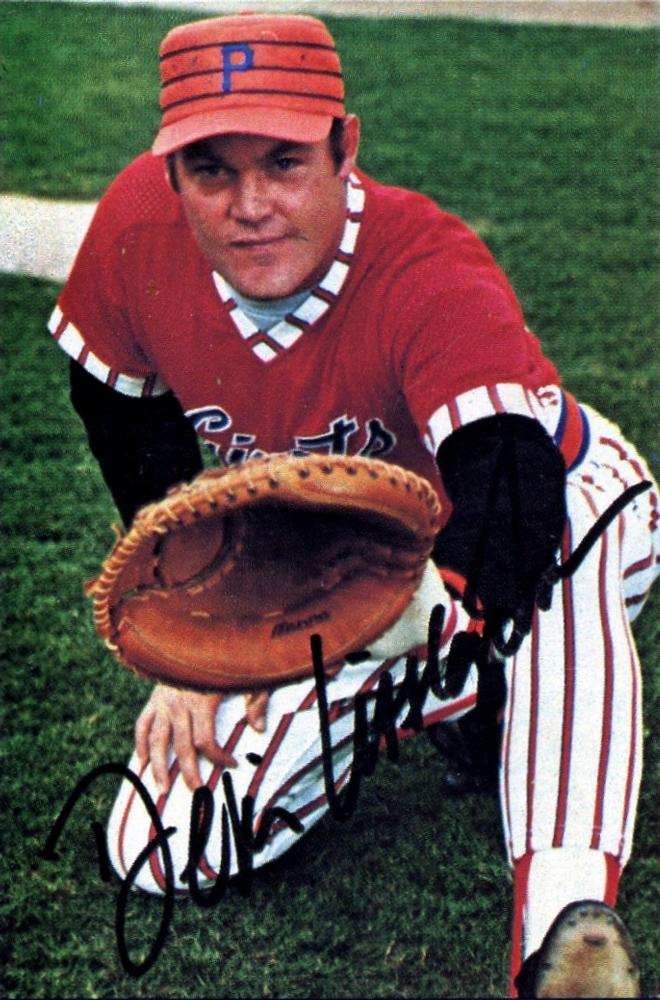
- Littlejohn with the Phoenix Giants c. 1981
- Catcher
- Born: October 4, 1954; Santa Monica, California, U.S.
- Batted: Right Threw: Right

MLB debut
- July 9, 1978, for the San Francisco Giants

Last MLB appearance
- October 5, 1980, for the San Francisco Giants

MLB statistics
- Batting average: .203
- Home run: 1
- Runs batted in: 15
- Stats at Baseball Reference

Teams
- San Francisco Giants (1978–1980)

Dennis Gerald Littlejohn (October 4, 1954) is an American former Major League Baseball player who played catcher from 1978 to 1980. He would play for the San Francisco Giants. Littlejohn attended the University of Southern California.
