= Randy Scarbery =

American baseball player (born 1952)

- Pitcher
- Born: June 22, 1952 (age 74); Fresno, California, U.S.
- Batted: Switch Threw: Right

MLB debut
- April 16, 1979, for the Chicago White Sox

Last MLB appearance
- May 29, 1980, for the Chicago White Sox

MLB statistics
- Win–loss record: 3–10
- Earned run average: 4.50
- Strikeouts: 63
- Stats at Baseball Reference

Teams
- Chicago White Sox (1979–1980)

Randy James Scarbery (born June 22, 1952) is an American former professional baseball pitcher. He played in part of two seasons in the major leagues from 1979–1980 for the Chicago White Sox.
