= 1971 Southern Illinois Salukis baseball team =

American college baseball season

1971 Southern Illinois Salukis baseball

District 4 champions

College World Series, Runner-Up
- Conference: Midwestern Conference

Ranking
- Coaches: No. 2
- CB: No. 2
- Record: 43–9 (11–1 CMU)
- Head coach: Itch Jones (2nd season)
- Home stadium: Abe Martin Field

1971 Midwestern Conference baseball standings
	Conf.				Overall
Team	W		L	PCT	W		L	PCT
No. 2 Southern Illinois ‍†‍‍^{y}	11	–	1	.917	43	–	9	.827
Indiana State ‍‍‍	8	–	4	.667	22	–	8	.733
Northern Illinois ‍‍‍	5	–	6	.455	24	–	15	.615
Ball State ‍‍‍	3	–	7	.300	13	–	18	.419
Illinois State ‍‍‍	3	–	10	.231	17	–	20	.459
† – Conference champion y – Invited to the NCAA tournament As of June 17, 1971; Rankings from Collegiate Baseball

The 1971 Southern Illinois Salukis baseball team represented the University of Southern Illinois in the 1968 NCAA University Division baseball season. The Salukis played their home games at Abe Martin Field. The team was coached by Itch Jones in his 2nd season at Southern Illinois.

The Salukis lost the College World Series, defeated by the USC Trojans in the championship game.

== Roster ==
1971 Southern Illinois Salukis roster
Pitchers: Jim Bokelmann - Freshman; Dick Langdon - Junior; Scott Waltemate - Freshman	Catchers: 29 Larry Calufetti - Sophomore; Bob Sedik - Senior; Infielders: 5 Mike Eden - Junior; 10 Duane Kuiper - Junior; 16 Dan Radison - Junior	Outfielders: 9 Jim Dwyer - Junior; Dan Thomas - Sophomore; Joe Wallis - Freshman; 6 Ken Kral - sophomore

== Schedule and results ==
Legend
Southern Illinois win
Southern Illinois loss
Southern Illinois tie

1971 Southern Illinois Salukis baseball game log
Regular season (36–6)
March (8–3)

Date	Opponent	Site/stadium	Score	Overall record	CMU record
March 21	at UNLV	Unknown • Paradise, Nevada	2–1	1–0	0–0
March 22	vs UC Irvine	Unknown • Los Angeles, California	4–1	2–0	0–0
March 23	at Cal State Los Angeles	Unknown • Los Angeles, California	5–10	2–1	0–0
March 23	vs Cal State Pomona	Unknown • Los Angeles, California	3–4	2–2	0–0
March 24	vs Chapman	Unknown • Los Angeles, California	8–2	3–2	0–0
March 25	vs Cal State Fullerton	Unknown • Los Angeles, California	9–3	4–2	0–0
March 26	vs UCLA	Unknown • Los Angeles, California	5–6	4–3	0–0
March 27	vs Cal State Pomona	Unknown • Los Angeles, California	6–0	5–3	0–0
March 29	at New Mexico	Lobo Field • Albuquerque, New Mexico	13–11	6–3	0–0
March 31	Monmouth	Abe Martin Field • Carbondale, Illinois	9–6	7–3	0–0
March 31	Monmouth	Abe Martin Field • Carbondale, Illinois	17–3	8–3	0–0

April (15–2)

Date	Opponent	Site/stadium	Score	Overall record	CMU record
April 2	Memphis State	Abe Martin Field • Carbondale, Illinois	6–2	9–3	0–0
April 3	Memphis State	Abe Martin Field • Carbondale, Illinois	3–4	9–4	0–0
April 3	Memphis State	Abe Martin Field • Carbondale, Illinois	6–2	10–4	0–0
April 4	MacMurray	Abe Martin Field • Carbondale, Illinois	10–0	11–4	0–0
April 4	MacMurray	Abe Martin Field • Carbondale, Illinois	8–1	12–4	0–0
April 9	Tulsa	Abe Martin Field • Carbondale, Illinois	9–2	13–4	0–0
April 10	Tulsa	Abe Martin Field • Carbondale, Illinois	9–1	14–4	0–0
April 10	Tulsa	Abe Martin Field • Carbondale, Illinois	5–4	15–4	0–0
April 12	Ole Miss	Abe Martin Field • Carbondale, Illinois	5–4	16–4	0–0
April 16	Illinois	Abe Martin Field • Carbondale, Illinois	14–1	17–4	0–0
April 17	Illinois	Abe Martin Field • Carbondale, Illinois	7–6	18–4	0–0
April 17	Illinois	Abe Martin Field • Carbondale, Illinois	6–2	19–4	0–0
April 20	at Washington University (MO)	Unknown • St. Louis, Missouri	5–1	20–4	0–0
April 23	Indiana State	Abe Martin Field • Carbondale, Illinois	9–3	21–4	1–0
April 24	Indiana State	Abe Martin Field • Carbondale, Illinois	5–1	22–4	2–0
April 24	Indiana State	Abe Martin Field • Carbondale, Illinois	7–9	22–5	2–1
April 30	at Western Kentucky	Nick Denes Field • Bowling Green, Kentucky	7–4	23–5	2–1

May (13–1)

Date	Opponent	Site/stadium	Score	Overall record	CMU record
May 1	at Western Kentucky	Nick Denes Field • Bowling Green, Kentucky	5–3	24–5	2–1
May 1	at Western Kentucky	Nick Denes Field • Bowling Green, Kentucky	7–8	24–6	2–1
May 4	at Evansville	Unknown • Evansville, Indiana	22–2	25–6	2–1
May 7	Illinois State	Abe Martin Field • Carbondale, Illinois	13–6	26–6	3–1
May 8	Illinois State	Abe Martin Field • Carbondale, Illinois	7–1	27–6	4–1
May 8	Illinois State	Abe Martin Field • Carbondale, Illinois	12–2	28–6	5–1
May 14	at Northern Illinois	Ralph McKinzie Field • DeKalb, Illinois	5–4	29–6	6–1
May 15	at Northern Illinois	Ralph McKinzie Field • DeKalb, Illinois	8–6	30–6	7–1
May 15	at Northern Illinois	Ralph McKinzie Field • DeKalb, Illinois	17–8	31–6	8–1
May 18	McKendree	Abe Martin Field • Carbondale, Illinois	9–3	32–6	8–1
May 18	McKendree	Abe Martin Field • Carbondale, Illinois	7–0	33–6	8–1
May 21	Ball State	Abe Martin Field • Carbondale, Illinois	8–1	34–6	9–1
May 22	Ball State	Abe Martin Field • Carbondale, Illinois	9–1	35–6	10–1
May 22	Ball State	Abe Martin Field • Carbondale, Illinois	7–3	36–6	11–1

Postseason (7–3)
District IV Playoff (4–1)

Date	Opponent	Site/stadium	Score	Overall record	CMU record
May 27	vs Ohio	John H. Kobs Field • East Lansing, Michigan	5–4	37–6	11–1
May 28	vs Cincinnati	John H. Kobs Field • East Lansing, Michigan	10–11	37–7	11–1
May 28	vs Ohio	John H. Kobs Field • East Lansing, Michigan	7–1	38–7	11–1
May 29	vs Cincinnati	John H. Kobs Field • East Lansing, Michigan	6–2	39–7	11–1
May 29	vs Cincinnati	John H. Kobs Field • East Lansing, Michigan	10–7	40–7	11–1

1971 College World Series (3–2)

Date	Opponent	Site/stadium	Score	Overall record	CMU record
June 12	vs Texas–Pan American	Johnny Rosenblatt Stadium • Omaha, Nebraska	5–4	41–7	11–1
June 13	vs USC	Johnny Rosenblatt Stadium • Omaha, Nebraska	8–3	42–7	11–1
June 14	vs Tulsa	Johnny Rosenblatt Stadium • Omaha, Nebraska	4–9	42–8	11–1
June 15	vs Texas–Pan American	Johnny Rosenblatt Stadium • Omaha, Nebraska	8–6	43–8	11–1
June 17	vs USC	Johnny Rosenblatt Stadium • Omaha, Nebraska	2–7	43–9	11–1

Schedule Source:

== Awards and honors ==
Mike Eden

- All Tournament Team

Dan Radison

- All Tournament Team

Jim Dwyer

- All Tournament Team

Larry Calufetti

- All Tournament Team

Bob Sedik

- AACBC Third Team All-American

== Salukis in the 1971 MLB draft ==
The following members of the Southern Illinois Salukis baseball program were drafted in the 1971 Major League Baseball draft.

Round	Pick	Player	Position	MLB Club
11	255	Jim Dwyer	OF	St. Louis Cardinals
22	516	Richard Langdon	P	Cleveland Indians
27	620	Mike Eden	3B	Cleveland Indians
