= 1971 NCAA University Division baseball tournament =

American college sports championship

- Season: 1971
- Teams: 23
- Finals site: Johnny Rosenblatt Stadium; Omaha, NE
- Champions: Southern California (7th title)
- Runner-up: Southern Illinois (3rd CWS Appearance)
- Winning coach: Rod Dedeaux (7th title)
- MOP: Jerry Tabb (Tulsa)

The 1971 NCAA University Division baseball tournament was played at the end of the 1971 NCAA University Division baseball season to determine the national champion of college baseball. The tournament concluded with eight teams competing in the College World Series, a double-elimination tournament in its twenty-fifth year. Eight regional districts sent representatives to the College World Series with preliminary rounds within each district serving to determine each representative. These events would later become known as regionals. Each district had its own format for selecting teams, resulting in 23 teams participating in the tournament at the conclusion of their regular season, and in some cases, after a conference tournament. The twenty-fifth tournament's champion was Southern California, coached by Rod Dedeaux. The Most Outstanding Player was Jerry Tabb of Tulsa.

== Tournament ==
The opening rounds of the tournament were played across eight district sites across the country, each consisting of between two and four teams. The winners of each District advanced to the College World Series.

Bold indicates winner.

=== District 1 at Cambridge, Massachusetts ===
Finals
UMass	1	2	—
**Harvard**	**2**	**4**	—

=== District 2 at Princeton, NJ ===
Upper round 1
**Seton Hall**	**3**
Buffalo	1
**Saint Joseph's**	**3**
Penn State	0
Lower round 1
**Penn State**	**2**
Buffalo	0

Upper final
**Seton Hall**	**8**
Saint Joseph's	1
Lower final
**Saint Joseph's**	**2**
Penn State	1

Final
**Seton Hall**	**4**	—
Saint Joseph's	1	—

=== District 3 at Gastonia, NC ===
Upper round 1
**Mississippi State**	**2**
Maryland	1
**Miami (FL)**	**4**
Georgia Tech	3
Lower round 1
Maryland	4
**Georgia Tech**	**9**

Upper final
**Mississippi State**	**7**
Miami (FL)	3
Lower final
**Georgia Tech**	5
Miami (FL)	3

Final
**Mississippi State**	8	**5**
Georgia Tech	**20**	2

=== District 4 at East Lansing, MI ===
Upper round 1
**Cincinnati**	**8**
Michigan State	7
**Southern Illinois**	**5**
Ohio	4
Lower round 1
Michigan State	1
**Ohio**	**7**

Upper final
**Cincinnati**	**11**
Southern Illinois	10
Lower final
Ohio	1*
**Southern Illinois**	**7***

Final
Cincinnati	2	7
**Southern Illinois**	**6**	**10**

=== District 5 at Tulsa, OK ===
Finals
**Tulsa**	**3**	**5**	—
Iowa State	2	0	—

=== District 6 at Austin, TX ===
Finals
**Texas–Pan American**	**1**	**4**	—
Texas	0	0	—

=== District 7 at Provo, UT ===
Finals
**BYU**	3	**5**	**15**
Gonzaga	**12**	1	6

=== District 8 at Santa Clara, CA & Los Angeles ===
Semifinal				Final
				Santa Clara	**6**	1	1
**Santa Clara**	**5**	**3**	—	**Southern California**	5	**5**	**9**
San Jose State	0	1	—

== College World Series ==
=== Participants ===
School	Conference	Record (conference)	Head coach	CWS appearances	CWS best finish	CWS record
BYU	WAC	31–14 (12–4)	Glen Tuckett	1 (last: 1968)	8th (1968)	0–2
Harvard	EIBL	26–6 (9–5)	Loyal Park	1 (last: 1968)	7th (1968)	0–2
Mississippi State	SEC	32–10 (13–5)	Paul Gregory	0 (last: none)	none	0–0
Seton Hall	Metropolitan Intercollegiate Conference	16–12 (n/a)	Owen Carroll	1 (last: 1964)	5th (1964)	1–2
Southern California	Pac-8	41–10 (17–0)	Rod Dedeaux	12 (last: 1970)	1st (1948, 1958, 1961, 1963, 1968, 1970)	38–16
Southern Illinois	Midwestern	40–7 (11–1)	Richard Jones	2 (last: 1969)	2nd (1968)	3–4
Texas-Pan American	n/a	42–7 (n/a)	Al Ogletree	0 (last: none)	none	0–0
Tulsa	MVC	32–10 (n/a)	Gene Shell	1 (last: 1969)	2nd (1969)	3–2

=== Results ===
==== Bracket ====
Upper round 1
Harvard	4
BYU	1
Tulsa	5
Mississippi State	2
Southern California	5
Seton Hall	1
Southern Illinois	5
Texas–Pan American	4

Upper round 2
Harvard	8
Tulsa	9
Southern California	3
Southern Illinois	8
Lower round 1
BYU	3
Mississippi State	1
Seton Hall	2
Texas–Pan American	8

Upper final
Tulsa	9
Southern Illinois	4
Lower round 2
Southern California	8
BYU	6
Harvard	0
Texas–Pan American	1

Semifinals
Tulsa	4
Southern California	8
Southern Illinois	8
Texas–Pan American	6

Preliminary final
Southern California	3
Tulsa	2

Final
Southern California	7
Southern Illinois	2

==== Game results ====
Date	Game	Winner	Score	Loser	Notes
June 11	Game 1	Harvard	4–1	BYU	
June 11	Game 2	Tulsa	5–2	Mississippi State	
June 12	Game 3	Southern California	5–1	Seton Hall	
June 12	Game 4	Southern Illinois	5–4	Texas–Pan American	
June 12	Game 5	BYU	3–1	Mississippi State	Mississippi State eliminated
June 13	Game 6	Texas–Pan American	8–2	Seton Hall	Seton Hall eliminated
June 13	Game 7	Tulsa	9–8	Harvard	
June 13	Game 8	Southern Illinois	8–3	Southern California	
June 14	Game 9	Texas–Pan American	1–0	Harvard	Harvard eliminated
June 14	Game 10	Southern California	8–6	BYU	BYU eliminated
June 14	Game 11	Tulsa	9–4	Southern Illinois	
June 15	Game 12	Southern Illinois	8–6	Texas–Pan American	Texas–Pan American eliminated
June 15	Game 13	Southern California	8–4	Tulsa	
June 16	Game 14	Southern California	3–2	Tulsa	Tulsa eliminated
June 17	Final	Southern California	7–2	Southern Illinois	Southern California wins CWS

=== All-Tournament Team ===
The following players were members of the All-Tournament Team.

Position	Player	School
P	Steve Rogers	Tulsa
P	Mark Sogge	USC
C	Larry Calufetti	Southern Illinois
1B	Jerry Tabb (MOP)	Tulsa
2B	Frank Alfano	USC
3B	Mike Eden	Southern Illinois
SS	Dan Radison	Southern Illinois
OF	Steve Bowling	Tulsa
OF	Jim Dwyer	Southern Illinois
OF	Fred Lynn	USC

=== Notable players ===
- BYU: Dane Iorg
- Harvard: Pete Varney
- Mississippi State: Bob Myrick
- Southern California: Steve Busby, Fred Lynn, Eric Raich, Randy Scarbery
- Southern Illinois: Jim Dwyer, Mike Eden, Duane Kuiper, Dan Thomas
- Texas–Pan American: Wayne Tyrone, Jim Tyrone
- Tulsa: Steve Bowling, Mardie Cornejo, Steve Rogers, Mike Sember, Jerry Tabb

== See also ==
- 1971 NCAA College Division baseball tournament
- 1971 NAIA World Series
