= List of NCAA college baseball rankings =

The NCAA college baseball rankings consist of a series of human polls which rank the top teams in college baseball from the preseason until after the College World Series. The Coaches Poll is voted by a panel of 31 coaches, all of whom are members of the American Baseball Coaches Association, and is published by USA Today beginning in the preseason, and then weekly after the second week of the regular season. Baseball America also publishes a ranking, which is voted by its staff members, and appears from the preseason through the end of the season. Collegiate Baseball Newspaper published the first poll of college baseball teams in 1959, and ranks the top 40 teams in the preseason and top 30 teams during the regular season and postseason. The National Collegiate Baseball Writers Association, or NCBWA, has, since 1998, published a ranking of the top 35 teams in the preseason and top 30 during the regular season and postseason, as voted by 40 of its members.

== NCAA Division I poll seasons (1959–present) ==
Poll season	Season	Champion
1959	1959 season	Oklahoma State
1960	1960 season	Minnesota
1961	1961 season	Southern California
1962	1962 season	Michigan
1963	1963 season	Southern California
1964	1964 season	Minnesota
1965	1965 season	Arizona State
1966	1966 season	Ohio State
1967	1967 season	Arizona State
1968	1968 season	Southern California
1969	1969 season	Arizona State
1970	1970 season	Southern California
1971	1971 season	Southern California
1972	1972 season	Southern California
1973	1973 season	Southern California
1974	1974 season	Southern California
1975	1975 season	Texas
1976	1976 season	Arizona
1977	1977 season	Arizona State
1978	1978 season	Southern California
1979	1979 season	Cal State Fullerton
1980	1980 season	Arizona
1981	1981 season	Arizona State
1982	1982 season	Miami (FL)
1983	1983 season	Texas
1984	1984 season	Cal State Fullerton
1985	1985 season	Miami (FL)
1986	1986 season	Arizona
1987	1987 season	Stanford
1988	1988 season	Stanford
1989	1989 season	Wichita State
1990	1990 season	Georgia
1991	1991 season	LSU
1992	1992 season	Pepperdine
1993	1993 season	LSU
1994	1994 season	Oklahoma
1995	1995 season	Cal State Fullerton
1996	1996 season	LSU
1997	1997 season	LSU
1998	1998 season	Southern California
1999	1999 season	Miami (FL)
2000	2000 season	LSU
2001	2001 season	Miami (FL)
2002	2002 season	Texas
2003	2003 season	Rice
2004	2004 season	Cal State Fullerton
2005	2005 season	Texas
2006	2006 season	Oregon State
2007	2007 season	Oregon State
2008	2008 season	Fresno State
2009	2009 season	LSU
2010	2010 season	South Carolina
2011	2011 season	South Carolina
2012	2012 season	Arizona
2013	2013 season	UCLA
2014	2014 season	Vanderbilt
2015	2015 season	Virginia
2016	2016 season	Coastal Carolina
2017	2017 season	Florida
2018	2018 season	Oregon State
2019	2019 season	Vanderbilt
2020	2020 season	Cancelled due to COVID-19 pandemic
2021	2021 season	Mississippi State
