= Itch Jones =

American baseball coach (1938–2025)

Biographical details
- Born: February 15, 1938; Herrin, Illinois, U.S.
- Died: February 17, 2025 (aged 87); Gore, Oklahoma, U.S.

Playing career
- 1957–1960: Southern Illinois
- 1960: Bluefield Orioles
- 1960: Stockton Ports
- Position: Second baseman

Coaching career (HC unless noted)
- 1966–1968: MacMurray
- 1969: Southern Illinois (asst.)
- 1970–1990: Southern Illinois
- 1991–2005: Illinois

Head coaching record
- Overall: 1,240–718–6 (.633)

Accomplishments and honors

Championships
- Midwestern (1971); 7× Missouri Valley (1975, 1976, 1977, 1978, 1984, 1986, 1990); Missouri Valley Tournament (1990); 2× Big Ten (1998, 2005); Big Ten Tournament (2000)

Awards
- 4× Missouri Valley Coach of the Year (1977, 1981, 1986, 1990); 2× Big Ten Coach of the Year (1998, 2005); 2× National Coach of the Year (1971, 1977)

Richard C. "Itch" Jones (February 15, 1938 – February 17, 2025) was an American college baseball coach. Jones coached the Southern Illinois Salukis from 1970 to 1990 and the Illinois Fighting Illini from 1991 to 2005. Jones was twice named the national college baseball coach of the year.

== Early life ==
Jones was born on February 15, 1938, in Herrin, Illinois. He broke his leg while in third grade, and the cast he had to wear caused severe itching. To get a measure of relief, he stuck a flyswatter handle between the cast and his leg. His cousin, Albert, nicknamed him "Itchy". The nickname stuck, though in later years it was shortened to "Itch".

== Baseball career ==
Jones attended Southern Illinois University-Carbondale, and played college baseball as a second baseman for the Southern Illinois Salukis. He graduated in 1960. Jones then played professional baseball for one year in the Baltimore Orioles minor-league system. In 1961, Jones accepted a position at Jacksonville High School coaching freshman football and junior varsity basketball. In 1964, Jones was promoted to head varsity basketball coach. In 1964, Jones led his JHS team to the Sweet Sixteen in the Illinois High School basketball tournament.

Jones became head baseball coach at MacMurray College in 1966. He returned to Southern Illinois as an assistant under Joe Lutz in 1968, becoming head coach in 1970. In 21 years, he led the Salukis to 10 NCAA Division I baseball tournaments and three College World Series. His best team was the 1971 unit, which came within one game of winning the national title. His record of 738 wins are the most of any coach for the Southern Illinois baseball.

In 1991, Jones became the head coach of the Illinois Fighting Illini of the University of Illinois Urbana-Champaign. He won his 1,000th game as a college head coach on April 8, 1998. In 15 years, he compiled a record of 474–373–1, including two Big Ten Conference regular-season titles, a Big Ten Tournament title in 2000, and two NCAA tournament appearances. He retired after the 2005 season. At the time of his retirement, he was the 15th winningest coach in collegiate baseball history.

Twenty of Jones' players went on to play in the major leagues, including Dave Stieb, Steve Finley, and Scott Spiezio. He was named national coach of the year twice, in 1971 and 1977. Jones won the Missouri Valley Conference Coach of the Year Award four times and the Big Ten Conference Coach of the Year Award twice. He was inducted into the halls of fame for the Missouri Valley Conference, American Baseball Coaches Association, Illinois High School Association, Southern Illinois University, MacMurray College, Jacksonville High School, and Herrin High School. In 2014, Southern Illinois renovated their baseball stadium and dedicated it as Itchy Jones Stadium.

== Personal life ==
Jones and his wife, Sue, an elementary school teacher, had two children. In December 2000, Jones was diagnosed with breast cancer. He underwent radiation and chemotherapy, as well as two surgeries, and went into remission in July 2001.

Jones died of Creutzfeldt–Jakob disease in Gore, Oklahoma, on February 17, 2025, at the age of 87.

== Head coaching record ==
Record table
Season	Team	Overall	Conference	Standing	Postseason
MacMurray Highlanders (Independent) (1966–1968)
1966	MacMurray				
1967	MacMurray				
1968	MacMurray				
MacMurray:		28–33			
Southern Illinois Salukis (Independent) (1970)
1970	Southern Illinois	29–8			District 4 tournament
Southern Illinois Salukis (Midwestern Conference) (1971–1972)
1971	Southern Illinois	43–9	11–1	1st	College World Series
1972	Southern Illinois	32–8–1	7–4	2nd	
Southern Illinois Salukis (Independent) (1973–1974)
1973	Southern Illinois	37–6			District 4 tournament
1974	Southern Illinois	50–12			College World Series
Southern Illinois Salukis (Missouri Valley Conference) (1975–1990)
1975	Southern Illinois	36–13–1		1st	
1976	Southern Illinois	39–14–1		1st	Mideast Regional
1977	Southern Illinois	41–12		1st	College World Series
1978	Southern Illinois	37–14		1st	Midwest Regional
1979	Southern Illinois	37–10		3rd	
1980	Southern Illinois	34–16		2nd	
1981	Southern Illinois	30–17	7–3	1st (East)	Midwest Regional
1982	Southern Illinois	32–20	8–8	2nd (East)	Missouri Valley Tournament
1983	Southern Illinois	23–18	4–2	2nd (East)	Missouri Valley Tournament
1984	Southern Illinois	20–22	9–4	1st	Missouri Valley Tournament
1985	Southern Illinois	28–29	5–15	6th	
1986	Southern Illinois	39–22–2	13–7	1st	Central Regional
1987	Southern Illinois	36–21	10–10	4th	Missouri Valley Tournament
1988	Southern Illinois	40–22	11–9	3rd	Missouri Valley Tournament
1989	Southern Illinois	26–38	6–14	6th	Missouri Valley Tournament
1990	Southern Illinois	49–14	14–6	1st	NCAA Regional
Southern Illinois:		738–345–5	105–83		
Illinois Fighting Illini (Big Ten Conference) (1991–2005)
1991	Illinois	26–30	13–15	7th	
1992	Illinois	36–20	16–12	4th	Big Ten tournament
1993	Illinois	32–23	12–16	T-8th	
1994	Illinois	26–26	12–16	T-7th	
1995	Illinois	25–31	14–14	T-5th	
1996	Illinois	37–22	17–11	T-3rd	Big Ten tournament
1997	Illinois	32–27	17–10	3rd	Big Ten tournament
1998	Illinois	42–21	19–5	1st	South I Regional
1999	Illinois	34–22	15–12	3rd	Big Ten tournament
2000	Illinois	41–23	17–11	T-3rd	NCAA Regional
2001	Illinois	29–28	13–14	5th	Big Ten tournament
2002	Illinois	32–19	14–15	T-6th	
2003	Illinois	27–26	12–19	T-6th	
2004	Illinois	22–33	11–21	9th	
2005	Illinois	33–23–1	20–12	1st	Big Ten tournament
Illinois:		474–373–1	222–203		
Total:		1,240–718–6			
National champion Postseason invitational champion Conference regular season champion Conference regular season and conference tournament champion Division regular season champion Division regular season and conference tournament champion Conference tournament champion

== See also ==
- List of college baseball career coaching wins leaders
