= Danny Thomas (baseball) =

American baseball player (1951–1980)

- 1977 rookie card
- Left fielder
- Born: May 9, 1951; Birmingham, Alabama, U.S.
- Died: June 12, 1980 (aged 29); Mobile, Alabama, U.S.
- Batted: Right Threw: Right

MLB debut
- September 2, 1976, for the Milwaukee Brewers

Last MLB appearance
- May 18, 1977, for the Milwaukee Brewers

MLB statistics
- Batting average: .274
- Home runs: 6
- Runs Batted In: 26
- Stats at Baseball Reference

Teams
- Milwaukee Brewers (1976–1977)

Danny Lee Thomas (May 9, 1951 – June 12, 1980) was an American Major League Baseball player who played for the Milwaukee Brewers in late 1976 and early 1977. During his brief major league career, he became known as the "Sundown Kid" because of his well-publicized refusal to play on seventh-day Sabbath.

== Early years ==
Born in Birmingham, Alabama, Thomas grew up in East Carondelet, Illinois, graduated from Dupo Senior High School, and played college baseball at Southern Illinois University in Carbondale. In June 1971, he played in the College World Series; the Southern Illinois Salukis advanced to the championship game, but lost to the USC Trojans 7–2 on June 17.

The next year, Thomas was picked sixth overall in the 1972 amateur draft by the Milwaukee Brewers. In 1975, he was suspended for a half-season for striking an umpire, but in 1976 he had a league-leading .325 batting average in the Eastern League, playing for the Berkshire Brewers, and was named the league's Player of the Year. He won the Eastern League's Triple Crown by also leading in home runs and runs batted in, an accomplishment that was not equalled in that minor league until Lou Montañez garnered the Eastern League Triple Crown 32 years later, in 2008.

== Major league career ==
Joining the Brewers in September 1976, Thomas played 54 games for the Brewers in 1976 and 1977 as an outfielder and designated hitter. He had a career batting average of .274, an on-base percentage of .363, and a .457 slugging percentage.

=== The "Sundown Kid" ===
Thomas joined the Worldwide Church of God and began practicing strict Sabbath observance. When he arrived for spring training in 1977, he informed the Brewers that he would not play on the Sabbath, from sundown Friday to sundown Saturday. "The Sundown Kid", as he came to be called, missed a night game on Saturday, April 23, 1977, when he was slated to be in the lineup as cleanup hitter and left fielder, after having been excused from pre-sundown batting practice earlier in the day. Thomas said he heard on the radio that he was scheduled to play in the game and apologized to Brewers manager Alex Grammas.

He told People magazine, "If I'm good at baseball, it's only because God gave me the talent. I'll give it all I've got, but I won't play on the Sabbath". Thomas was also outspoken in criticizing pitchers who hit batters, saying, "I think they ought to make a rule that if a guy gets hit and is able to get up, they should tie the pitcher's hands behind his back and let the hitter smack him in the face."

== End of his baseball career ==
After playing 22 games for the Brewers in 1977, Thomas was demoted on May 20 to the Spokane Indians, the Brewers' Triple-A Pacific Coast League farm team in Spokane, Washington, although his batting average with Milwaukee was a respectable .271. A Milwaukee Journal columnist, Bill Dwyer, wrote, "No matter how tolerant and ecumenical Brewers' management wants to be, they are irked by having a player sit out two games a week." While playing for the Indians, Thomas agreed to a pay reduction of one day per week due to his missed Saturday games. His batting average declined considerably, however, and the Brewers announced his reassignment to their Eastern League Class AA affiliate in August. Thomas refused the demotion and did not play the remainder of the season, saying "It's like they're asking me, 'Do you want to stay in the minor leagues the rest of your life? Conform or get out.'" Brewers president Bud Selig said, "It's just a tragic story. I know a lot of people are mad at us because of what they think we've done to him ... He's really a nice kid who wants to do the right thing."

Thomas was unsuccessful in his later attempts to rejoin the Brewers or sign with another major league baseball organization in 1978. He then played in Boise, Idaho, for the independent Boise Buckskins (predecessor of the Boise Hawks) in the short-season Northwest League, where he won the Class A league's batting title in 1978. In 1979, Thomas played for the Miami Amigos of the short-lived Inter-American League. Afterwards, Thomas quit baseball.

== Personal life ==
Thomas and his wife Judy had two children. The family lived near Spokane, where he had difficulty finding steady employment after baseball. He worked for a pool company for a time.

Thomas suffered from mental health problems beginning not long after his promotion to the major leagues. Thomas would later say that he "couldn't take success" and that he began to drink and take pills. While playing winter ball in Venezuela after the 1976 season, Thomas was hospitalized after overdosing on pills; he was flown back to Milwaukee for psychiatric care. According to a friend who lived with Thomas and his wife, Thomas knew that he had problems: "Danny knew he wasn't right. He told us that. He once said to his wife, 'Judy, I wish I had cancer, then at least people would realize what was the matter with me.'" In June 1980, Thomas was arrested in Mobile on a rape charge involving a 12-year-old girl.

== Death ==
While in jail on the rape charge, Thomas died by suicide by hanging on June 12, 1980. His family was so impoverished by then that they were unable to afford funeral expenses or even remain in Alabama for his potter's field burial. After the outfielder's death, sports columnist John Blanchette of the Spokane Spokesman-Review described him as a "troubled soul," saying, "no one was more haunted than Danny Thomas."
