= 1971 NCAA University Division baseball rankings =

1971 NCAA University Division baseball season

Tournament

College World Series
- Champions: USC
- Runners-up: Tulsa
- MOP: Jerry Tabb (Tulsa)

Seasons
- ← 1970 1972 →

The following poll makes up the 1971 NCAA University Division baseball rankings. Collegiate Baseball Newspaper published its first human poll of the top 20 teams in college baseball in 1959, and expanded to rank the top 30 teams in 1961.

== Collegiate Baseball ==
Currently, only the final poll from the 1971 season is available.

Rank	Team
1	USC
2	Southern Illinois
3	Tulsa
4	Texas–Pan American
5	BYU
6	Harvard
7	Mississippi State
8	Seton Hall
9	Santa Clara
10	Georgia Tech
11	Ohio
12	Miami (Fla.)
13	Cincinnati
14	Michigan State
15	Gonzaga
16	Iowa State
17	Texas
18	Arizona State
19	Washington State
20	UMass
21	San Jose State
22	Maryland
23	Florida State
24	South Alabama
25	Iona
26	Buffalo
27	St. Joseph's (Pa.)
28	Penn State
29	Miami (Ohio)
30	Oklahoma
