= 1971 Mississippi State Bulldogs baseball team =

American college baseball season

1971 Mississippi State Bulldogs baseball

SEC West champions SEC Championship Series champions NCAA District III champions

College World Series, 0–2
- Conference: Southeastern Conference
- CB: No. 7
- Record: 32–12 (13–5 SEC)
- Head coach: Paul Gregory (15th season)
- Home stadium: Dudy Noble Field

1971 Southeastern Conference baseball standings
	Conf.				Overall
Team	W		L	PCT	W		L	PCT
Eastern Division
Vanderbilt ^{x}‍‍‍	11	–	5	.688	34	–	19	.642
Auburn ‍‍‍	9	–	7	.563	23	–	16	.590
Georgia ‍‍‍	8	–	8	.500	14	–	18	.438
Tennessee ‍‍‍	7	–	7	.500	15	–	15	.500
Kentucky ‍‍‍	7	–	8	.467	18	–	15	.545
Florida ‍‍‍	5	–	12	.294	19	–	26	.422
Western Division
No. 7 Mississippi State ^{x}‍‍‡‍^{y}	13	–	5	.722	32	–	12	.727
LSU ‍‍‍	10	–	8	.556	20	–	16	.556
Ole Miss ‍‍‍	7	–	11	.389	16	–	21	.432
Alabama ‍‍‍	6	–	12	.333	19	–	25	.432
x – Division champion ‡ – Championship series champion y – Invited to the NCAA tournament As of June 30, 1971; Rankings from Collegiate Baseball

The 1971 Mississippi State Bulldogs baseball team represented the Mississippi State University in the 1971 NCAA University Division baseball season. They were led by head coach Paul Gregory in his fifteenth season and played their home games at Dudy Noble Field. The Bulldogs were members of the Southeastern Conference, and finished with a record of 32–12, champions of the SEC West with a record of 13–5 and winners of the SEC Championship Series.

Mississippi State was invited to the NCAA Tournament, where they won the District III Tournament to advance to their first College World Series. The Bulldogs were eliminated after losses to eventual third place Tulsa and fifth place BYU.

== Personnel ==
=== Roster ===
1971 Mississippi State Bulldogs roster
Pitchers: 18 - Hugh Arant - Sophomore; 20 - Kenny Hudson - Senior; 21 - Lamar Pritchard - Freshman; 22 - Jerry Thompson - Senior; 24 - Bob Myrick - Freshman; 28 - Butch Holmes - Freshman; 29 - Dwight Reinstetle - Freshman; 31 - Jim Eichmeier - Senior; 32 - Mike Proffitt - Junior; 34 - Gene Henderson - Junior	Catchers: 11 - Bruce Irvin - Junior; 14 - Ronnie Brown - Sophomore; 35 - David Voss - Junior; Outfielders: 6 - Rick Spica - Junior; 10 - Dave Phares - Senior; 12 - Donnie Davis - Senior; 25 - Ted Milton - Junior; 27 - Mike Collins - Junior	Infielders: 2 - Dale Holland - Freshman; 7 - Joe Owen - Sophomore; 17 - Phil Still - Senior; 19 - Bobby Croswell - Senior; 33 - Roye Horne - Senior

=== Coaching staff ===
1971 Mississippi State Bulldogs coaching staff
- 36 - Paul Gregory - Head coach – 15th year
- 23 - Tom D'Armi - Assistant coach - 6th year

== Schedule ==
1971 Mississippi State Bulldogs baseball game log
Regular season

March
Date	Opponent	Site/stadium	Score	Overall record	SEC record
Mar 2	Iowa State*	Dudy Noble Field • Starkville, MS	W 7–5 ^{(7)}	1–0	
Mar 4	Iowa State*	Dudy Noble Field • Starkville, MS	W 6–5 ^{(7)}	2–0	
Mar 13	Memphis State*	Dudy Noble Field • Starkville, MS	W 10–0 ^{(7)}	3–0	
Mar 13	Memphis State*	Dudy Noble Field • Starkville, MS	W 6–2 ^{(7)}	4–0	
Mar 18	Clemson*	Dudy Noble Field • Starkville, MS	L 4–6	4–1	
Mar 19	Clemson*	Dudy Noble Field • Starkville, MS	W 2–1 ^{(7)}	5–1	
Mar 20	Clemson*	Dudy Noble Field • Starkville, MS	L 8–10	5–2	
Mar 23	St. Olaf*	Dudy Noble Field • Starkville, MS	W 7–0 ^{(7)}	6–2	
Mar 23	St. Olaf*	Dudy Noble Field • Starkville, MS	W 2–1 ^{(10)}	7–2	
Mar 26	Illinois Wesleyan*	Dudy Noble Field • Starkville, MS	W 11–0 ^{(7)}	8–2	
Mar 26	Illinois Wesleyan*	Dudy Noble Field • Starkville, MS	W 5–0 ^{(7)}	9–2	
Mar 29	New Orleans*	Dudy Noble Field • Starkville, MS	W 5–0 ^{(7)}	10–2	
Mar 29	New Orleans*	Dudy Noble Field • Starkville, MS	W 8–1 ^{(7)}	11–2	
Mar 31	at Loyola (LA)*	New Orleans, LA	L 2–5	11–3	

April
Date	Opponent	Site/stadium	Score	Overall record	SEC record
Apr 2	at LSU	Alex Box Stadium • Baton Rouge, LA	L 0–2 ^{(7)}	11–4	0–1
Apr 2	at LSU	Alex Box Stadium • Baton Rouge, LA	L 1–3	11–5	0–2
Apr 3	at LSU	Alex Box Stadium • Baton Rouge, LA	L 1–9	11–6	0–3
Apr 9	LSU	Dudy Noble Field • Starkville, MS	W 2–1 ^{(7)}	12–6	1–3
Apr 10	LSU	Dudy Noble Field • Starkville, MS	W 7–4	13–6	2–3
Apr 11	LSU	Dudy Noble Field • Starkville, MS	W 11–2	14–6	3–3
Apr 16	at Alabama	Sewell–Thomas Stadium • Tuscaloosa, AL	W 6–4 ^{(7)}	15–6	4–3
Apr 16	at Alabama	Sewell–Thomas Stadium • Tuscaloosa, AL	W 9–6	16–6	5–3
Apr 17	at Alabama	Sewell–Thomas Stadium • Tuscaloosa, AL	L 5–6 ^{(7)}	16–7	5–4
Apr 19	at Arkansas State*	Jonesboro, AR	W 5–4	17–7	
Apr 20	at Arkansas State*	Jonesboro, AR	W 6–4	18–7	
Apr 23	Alabama	Dudy Noble Field • Starkville, MS	W 8–7 ^{(7)}	19–7	6–4
Apr 23	Alabama	Dudy Noble Field • Starkville, MS	W 6–2	20–7	7–4
Apr 24	Alabama	Dudy Noble Field • Starkville, MS	L 7–8 ^{(13)}	20–8	7–5
Apr 27	Southern Miss*	Dudy Noble Field • Starkville, MS	W 9–0	21–8	
Apr 28	Southern Miss*	Dudy Noble Field • Starkville, MS	L 3–6	21–9	
Apr 30	at Ole Miss	Swayze Field • Oxford, MS (Rivalry)	W 15–12 ^{(10)}	22–9	8–5
Apr 30	at Ole Miss	Swayze Field • Oxford, MS	W 7–5 ^{(11)}	23–9	9–5

May
Date	Opponent	Site/stadium	Score	Overall record	SEC record
May 1	at Ole Miss	Swayze Field • Oxford, MS	W 5–2 ^{(7)}	24–9	10–5
May 7	Ole Miss	Dudy Noble Field • Starkville, MS	W 7–6 ^{(7)}	25–9	11–5
May 8	Ole Miss	Dudy Noble Field • Starkville, MS	W 4–2	26–9	12–5
May 8	Ole Miss	Dudy Noble Field • Starkville, MS	W 9–7	27–9	13–5

Postseason

SEC Championship Series
Date	Opponent	Site/stadium	Score	Overall record	Series record
May 14	Vanderbilt	Dudy Noble Field • Starkville, MS	W 5–1	28–9	1–0
May 15	at Vanderbilt	McGugin Field • Nashville, TN	W 3–1	29–9	2–0

NCAA District III Playoffs
Date	Opponent	Site/stadium	Score	Overall record	Regional record
May 27	Maryland	Sims Legion Park • Gastonia, NC	W 2–1	30–9	1–0
May 28	Miami (FL)	Sims Legion Park • Gastonia, NC	W 7–3	31–9	2–0
May 29	Georgia Tech	Sims Legion Park • Gastonia, NC	L 8–20	31–10	2–1
May 30	Georgia Tech	Sims Legion Park • Gastonia, NC	W 5–2	32–10	3–1

College World Series
Date	Opponent	Site/stadium	Score	Overall record	CWS record
June 11	Tulsa	Johnny Rosenblatt Stadium • Omaha, NE	L 2–5	32–11	0–1
June 12	BYU	Johnny Rosenblatt Stadium • Omaha, NE	L 1–3	32–12	0–2
