= Brock Pemberton (baseball) =

American baseball player (1953–2016)

- First baseman
- Born: November 6, 1953; Tulsa, Oklahoma, U.S.
- Died: February 17, 2016 (aged 62); Ardmore, Oklahoma, U.S.
- Batted: Both Threw: Left

MLB debut
- September 10, 1974, for the New York Mets

Last MLB appearance
- September 23, 1975, for the New York Mets

MLB statistics
- Batting average: .167
- Home runs: 0
- Runs batted in: 1
- Stats at Baseball Reference

Teams
- New York Mets (1974–1975)

Brock Pemberton (November 6, 1953 – February 17, 2016) was an American Major League Baseball player, a first baseman who played for the New York Mets in 1974 and 1975. He also played in the St. Louis Cardinals' organization. Pemberton played high school baseball in Huntington Beach, California, and was drafted by the Mets in the 6th round of the 1972 June Amateur Draft. After playing in the lower minor leagues in 1972 and 1973, he was promoted to AA level with the Victoria Toros of the Texas League in 1974. That year, he posted a .322 batting average in 134 games and 482 at bats for the Toros. He also had 8 home runs. This performance earned Pemberton a promotion to the Major League Mets late in the season. Pemberton made his debut with the Mets as a pinch hitter on September 10, 1974, against the Montreal Expos. The next day, the Mets and St. Louis Cardinals played a 25 inning game in which Pemberton got his first Major League hit, also as a pinch hitter. In all, he played 11 games for the Mets in 1974, with 4 hits in 22 at-bats and one run batted in. In four games as a first baseman he did not make an error.

Pemberton spent most of the 1975 season in the minor leagues with the AAA level Tidewater Tides. He batted .297 in 137 games and 474 at-bats, but had no home runs for the entire season. He did get another late season call up to the Mets, this time playing just two games as a pinch hitter, getting no hits in two at-bats. His last game with the Mets that season was on September 23, 1975, which was also his last Major League game. His final Major League statistics were 4 hits in 24 at-bats for a .167 batting average with 1 run batted in.

In 1976, Pemberton played the entire season with Tidewater. He batted .290 in 138 games and 520 at bats. He hit 3 home runs. He was traded with Leon Brown from the Mets to the St. Louis Cardinals for minor-league first baseman Ed Kurpiel on December 9, 1976. Pemberton played in 1977 in the Cardinals system with their AAA affiliate, the New Orleans Pelicans of the American Association. He batted .241 in 113 games and 381 at-bats and 3 home runs. After 1977, Pemberton did not play again in organized baseball until 1979, when he played for the Class AAA Miami Amigos in the Inter-American League. In 1980, he played for the unaffiliated Class A level Macon Peaches of the South Atlantic League. He batted .290 in 47 games and 162 at-bats and 4 home runs in 1980. In addition to playing, he also managed the Peaches for part of the 1980 season. Pemberton died on February 17, 2016, in Oklahoma.
