= Miami Amigos =

- 1979; Miami, Florida

Minor league affiliations
- Class: Class AAA (1979)
- League: Inter-American League (1979)

Major league affiliations
- Team: None

Minor league titles
- League titles (1): 1979
- Conference titles (1): 1979

Team data
- Name: Miami Amigos (1979)
- Ballpark: Miami Stadium (1979)

The Miami Amigos were a minor league baseball team based in Miami, Florida. In 1979, the Amigos played as members of the short–lived Class AAA level Inter-American League, winning the league championship in a shortened season. The Amigos played home games at Miami Stadium.

== History ==
The Miami Amigos began play in 1979 as charter members of the six–team, Class AAA level Inter-American League. The Inter–American League uniquely featured franchises based in five different countries. Teams from the United States, Panama, Puerto Rico, Dominican Republic and Venezuela comprised the league structure. The Miami Amigos played with fellow league members Caracas Metropolitanos (Venezuela), Panama Banqueros, Puerto Rico Boricuas, Petroleros de Zulia (Venezuela) and Santo Domingo Azucareros (Dominican Republic) as charter members.

The Inter–American League was formed as the brainchild of Roberto “Bobby” Maduro, an exile from Cuba. Maduro was the coordinator of Inter–American Baseball for MLB Baseball Commissioner Bowie Kuhn and had owned minor league franchises in Cuba and the United States. The league was formed for the 1979 season. The Miami Franchise was named the "Miami Amigos," playing home games at Miami Stadium, which was also home of the Class A team Miami Orioles. Later, Miami Stadium would be renamed Bobby Maduro Miami Stadium.

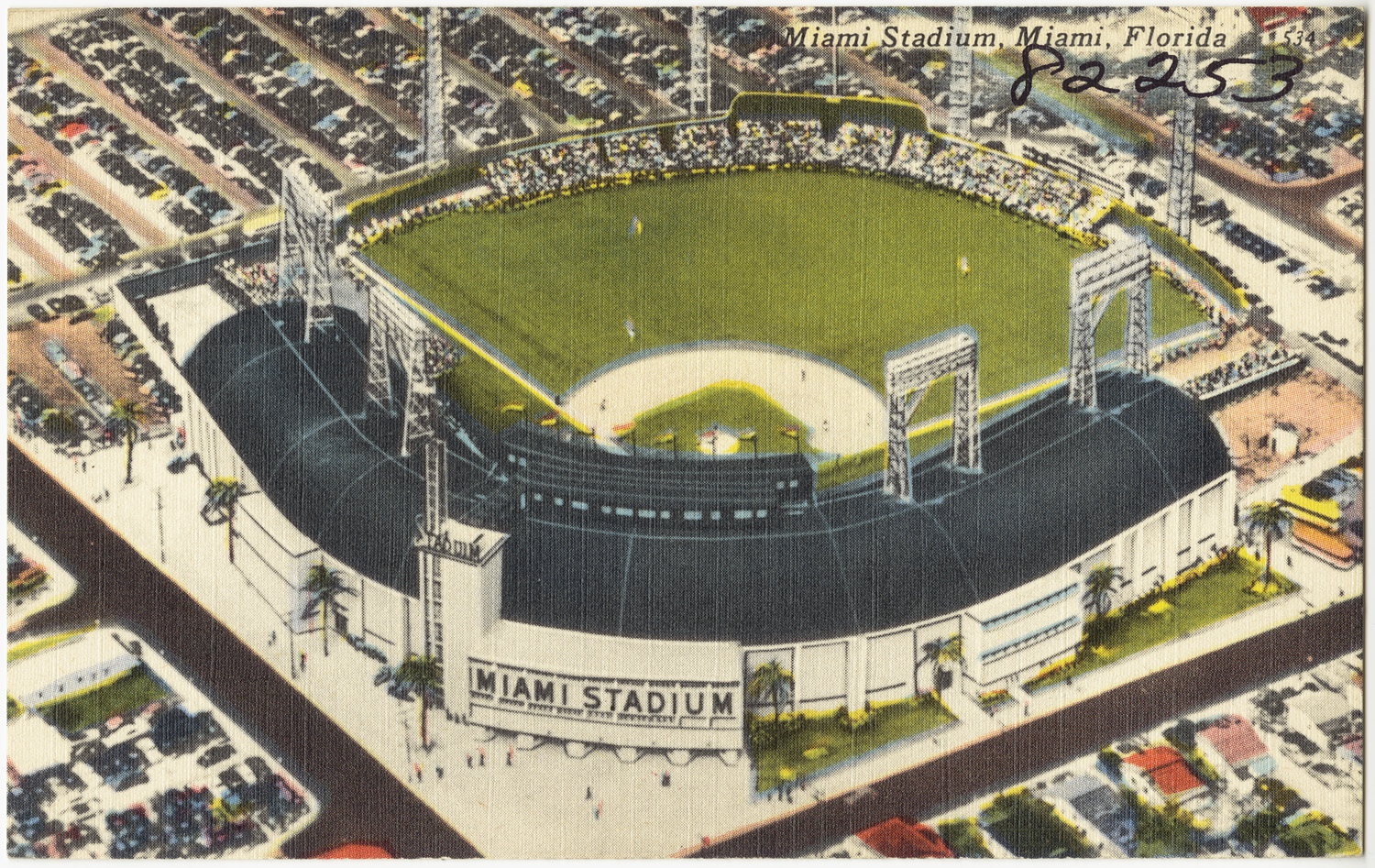
Miami Stadium, Miami, Florida.

Bobby Maduro publicly announced the creation of the Miami Amigos on September 14, 1978. The Miami franchise owners were Ronald Fine and Joe Ryan, who were already the owners of the Class A Miami Orioles of the Florida State League and shared Miami Stadium. Joe Ryan had previously served as president of the American Association. The cost for the Miami Amigos franchise was $50,000. Miami had a 130–game schedule for 1979, as did all league members.

Davey Johnson, who had played for the Chicago Cubs in 1978, was hired to be a player/manager for the Amigos, in his first managerial job. The roster contained many players with previous major league experience. The Amigos' average player age was 27.5 and 13 players on the roster had major league experience.

The Amigos’ uniforms were green with red and yellow trim. The Amigos' home uniform was a white jersey with white pants. The Miami road jersey was a bright green V–necked pullover with the "Miami Amigos" across the chest in yellow letters with red trim. The logo had "Miami" above "Amigos" with a large "A". The Amigos' cap was a pinwheel style with a red bill, a white front panel with a large red "M" joined with a pointed green "A", and a green background.

Beginning play, the Inter–American League and Miami debuted on April 11, 1979. Problems affected the league as rains cancelled large numbers of games. Visa issues and airline problems negatively affected travel and resulted in additional cancelled games. One Amigos game in Venezuela was called when the stadium lights failed and never came back on. The two Venezuelan teams generally drew good crowds. But the San Juan Boricuas occasionally drew fewer than 100 fans and moved some games to Puerto Rico, drawing 14,625 total attendance for the season. In mid–June, the San Juan and Panama (24,400 in attendance) owners immediately abandoned their teams, leaving players stranded across the Caribbean. Miami had crowds up to 3,500, with an average of 1,350 for home games at Miami Stadium, drawing 48,600 for the 72 games played. Miami was also affected by the rest of the Inter–American League issues. Miami owners Fine and Ryan offered a promotion where Amigos fans could purchase a joint season ticket with the Miami Orioles for all of the two teams’ combined 130 home games for $250. The Amigos and other teams in the league did not have television or radio broadcasts, negating potential revenue sources and fan interest in the games. Only one 1979 Miami Amigos game was broadcast in Miami, a radio broadcast.

Once the season began, Davey Johnson underwent back surgery and missed time with the team. Johnson had lingering effects from a home plate collision years earlier and was hitting .240 with one home run in 25 at–bats for the Amigos. Amigos player Dan Thomas, who was leading the league in home runs, was suspended by Johnson. Thomas' religious beliefs dictated that he was forbidden to play from sundown Friday until sundown Saturday and he had several incidents with umpires. Amigos player Oscar Zamora owned a successful shoe factory in Miami and could only travel to away games on the weekends. The atmosphere at Miami Stadium for Amigos games was festive, as the fans used conga drums and other percussion to play out Latin rhythms throughout the home games. The team cheerleaders were called the Hot and Juicy Wendy's Girls.

By June, the Inter–American League lost the San Juan and Panama franchises, who both folded. The Inter–American League then divided the season schedule into halves, awarding the first–half pennant to Miami, who were 43–17 in their first 60 games. The Amigos would only play 12 more games.

The Miami Amigos, playing under manager Davey Johnson, were in first place on June 30, 1979, when the Inter–American League permanently folded and were declared league champions. Miami had a 51–21 overall record and were 10.0 games ahead of the second place Caracas Metropolitanos in the league standings when the league permanently folded. Individually, Miami's Jim Tyrone won the league batting title, hitting .364 and also lead with 50 runs scored and 94 total hits. Brock Pemberton led the league with 52 RBI, while teammate Wayne Tyrone had 8 home runs to lead the league. On the mound, Miami's Mike Wallace led the Inter–American League with 11 wins and teammate Ron Martinez had a 0.89 ERA, tops in the league. The Amigos' shutdown left the above-mentioned Miami Orioles as the city's main pro baseball team, a status which would hold until 1991 (at which time they would move westward to Fort Myers), when the Florida (now Miami) Marlins were enfranchised as part of Major League Baseball's National League, starting play in 1993.

== The ballpark ==
The Miami Amigos played home games at Miami Stadium. The ballpark had a capacity of 9,548 (1992) and dimensions of (Left, Center, Right): 330–400–330 (1950). Miami Stadium was built in 1949. It had a cantilevered grandstand with no support beams. A high, rounded roof, with palm trees growing out of the paved walkway circled the stadium. The stadium was renamed "Bobby Maduro Miami Stadium" in 1987. It was torn down in 2001. Miami Stadium was located at 2301 Northwest 10th Avenue, Miami, Florida.

== Timeline ==
Year(s)	# Yrs.	Team	Level	League	Ballpark
1979	1	Miami Amigos	Class AAA	Inter-American League	Miami Stadium

== Year–by–year record ==
Year	Record	Finish	Manager	Playoffs/Notes
1979	51–21	1st	Davey Johnson	League folded June 30; League champions

== Notable alumni ==
- Porfi Altamirano (1979)
- Hal Breeden (1979)
- Wayne Granger (1979) Cincinnati Reds Hall of Fame
- Davey Johnson (1979, MGR) 4x MLB All-Star; Manager: 1986 World Series Champion: New York Mets
- Larry Johnson (1979)
- Wendell Kim (1979)
- Brock Pemberton (1979)
- Orlando Pena (1979)
- Bob Reynolds (1979)
- Mickey Scott (1979)
- Tommy Smith (1979)
- Dan Thomas (1979)
- Jim Tyrone (1979)
- Wayne Tyrone (1979)
- Mike Wallace (1979)
- Hank Webb (1979)
- Darrell Woodard (1979)
- Oscar Zamora (1979)

== See also ==
Miami Amigos players
