= 1971 NCAA University Division baseball season =

Baseball season

- Number of teams: 208

NCAA tournament

College World Series
- Champions: Southern California (7th title)
- Runners-up: Southern Illinois (2nd CWS Appearance)
- Winning coach: Rod Dedeaux (7th title)
- MOP: Jerry Tabb (Tulsa)

Seasons
- ← 1970 1972 →

The 1971 NCAA University Division baseball season, play of college baseball in the United States organized by the National Collegiate Athletic Association (NCAA) began in the spring of 1971. The season progressed through the regular season and concluded with the 1971 College World Series. The College World Series, held for the 25th time in 1971, consisted of one team from each of eight geographical districts and was held in Omaha, Nebraska at Johnny Rosenblatt Stadium as a double-elimination tournament. Southern California claimed the championship.

== Conference winners ==
This is a partial list of conference champions from the 1971 season. Each of the eight geographical districts chose, by various methods, the team that would represent them in the NCAA tournament. 10 teams earned automatic bids by winning their conference championship while 13 teams earned at-large selections.

Conference	Regular season winner	Conference tournament	Tournament venue • city	Tournament winner
Atlantic Coast Conference	Maryland	No tournament		
Big Eight Conference	Iowa State	No tournament		
Big Ten Conference	Michigan State	No tournament		
EIBL	Harvard	No tournament		
Mid-American Conference	Ohio	No tournament		
Midwestern Conference	Southern Illinois	No tournament		
Pacific-8 Conference	North - Washington State; South - Southern California	No tournament		
Southeastern Conference	East - Vanderbilt; West - Mississippi State	1971 Southeastern Conference baseball championship series	Alternating campus sites	Mississippi State
Southern Conference	The Citadel; Furman	No tournament		
Southwest Conference	Texas			
Yankee Conference	UMass			

== Conference standings ==
The following is an incomplete list of conference standings:

1971 Metropolitan Intercollegiate Conference baseball standings
	Conf.						Overall
Team	W		L		T	PCT	W		L		T	PCT
Iona ‍†‍‍	10	–	2	–	0	.833	19	–	5	–	0	.792
St. John's ‍‍‍	7	–	3	–	0	.700	24	–	5	–	1	.817
No. 8 Seton Hall ‍‍‍^{y}	8	–	5	–	0	.615	17	–	14	–	0	.548
Manhattan ‍‍‍	8	–	5	–	0	.615	14	–	8	–	1	.630
LIU ‍‍‍	6	–	6	–	0	.500	12	–	11	–	0	.522
St. Francis (NY) ‍‍‍	5	–	6	–	0	.455	12	–	11	–	0	.522
Wagner ‍‍‍	4	–	8	–	0	.333	7	–	13	–	0	.350
C. W. Post ‍‍‍	3	–	6	–	0	.333	12	–	11	–	0	.522
CCNY ‍‍‍	3	–	6	–	0	.333	0	–	0	–	0	–
Fairleigh Dickinson ‍‍‍	3	–	10	–	0	.231	10	–	16	–	0	.385
† – Conference champion y – Invited to the NCAA tournament As of June 17, 1971; Rankings from Collegiate Baseball

1971 Midwestern Conference baseball standings
	Conf.				Overall
Team	W		L	PCT	W		L	PCT
No. 2 Southern Illinois ‍†‍‍^{y}	11	–	1	.917	43	–	9	.827
Indiana State ‍‍‍	8	–	4	.667	22	–	8	.733
Northern Illinois ‍‍‍	5	–	6	.455	24	–	15	.615
Ball State ‍‍‍	3	–	7	.300	13	–	18	.419
Illinois State ‍‍‍	3	–	10	.231	17	–	20	.459
† – Conference champion y – Invited to the NCAA tournament As of June 17, 1971; Rankings from Collegiate Baseball

1971 Pacific-8 Conference baseball standings
	Conf.				Overall
Team	W		L	PCT	W		L	PCT
Northern Division
No. 19 Washington State ^{x}‍‍‍	7	–	8	.467	34	–	15	.694
Oregon ‍‍‍	7	–	9	.438		–		–
Oregon State ‍‍‍	6	–	10	.375		–		–
Washington ‍‍‍	1	–	14	.067	9	–	19	.321
Southern Division
No. 1 Southern California ^{x}‍‍‍^{y}	17	–	0	1.000	46	–	11	.807
Stanford ‍‍‍	11	–	6	.647	39	–	20	.661
UCLA ‍‍‍	11	–	6	.647	38	–	17	.691
California ‍‍‍	5	–	12	.294	24	–	24	.500
† – Conference champion y – Invited to the NCAA tournament As of June 30, 1971; Rankings from Collegiate Baseball

1971 Southeastern Conference baseball standings
	Conf.				Overall
Team	W		L	PCT	W		L	PCT
Eastern Division
Vanderbilt ^{x}‍‍‍	11	–	5	.688	34	–	19	.642
Auburn ‍‍‍	9	–	7	.563	23	–	16	.590
Georgia ‍‍‍	8	–	8	.500	14	–	18	.438
Tennessee ‍‍‍	7	–	7	.500	15	–	15	.500
Kentucky ‍‍‍	7	–	8	.467	18	–	15	.545
Florida ‍‍‍	5	–	12	.294	19	–	26	.422
Western Division
No. 7 Mississippi State ^{x}‍‍‡‍^{y}	13	–	5	.722	32	–	12	.727
LSU ‍‍‍	10	–	8	.556	20	–	16	.556
Ole Miss ‍‍‍	7	–	11	.389	16	–	21	.432
Alabama ‍‍‍	6	–	12	.333	19	–	25	.432
x – Division champion ‡ – Championship series champion y – Invited to the NCAA tournament As of June 30, 1971; Rankings from Collegiate Baseball

1971 Southern Conference baseball standings
	Conf.				Overall
Team	W		L	PCT	W		L	PCT
Furman ‍†‍‍	11	–	5	.688	21	–	12	.636
The Citadel ‍†‍‍	11	–	5	.688	22	–	9	.710
Richmond ‍‍‍	10	–	6	.625	14	–	13	.519
William & Mary ‍‍‍	10	–	6	.625	14	–	13	.519
East Carolina ‍‍‍	7	–	5	.583	15	–	19	.441
Davidson ‍‍‍	6	–	8	.429	18	–	15	.545
VMI ‍‍‍	1	–	16	.059	12	–	18	.400
y – Invited to the NCAA tournament As of June 30, 1971; Rankings from Collegiate Baseball

== College World Series ==
The 1971 season marked the twenty fifth NCAA baseball tournament, which culminated with the eight team College World Series. The College World Series was held in Omaha, Nebraska. The eight teams played a double-elimination format, with Southern California claiming their seventh championship with a 7–2 win over Southern Illinois in the final.

Upper round 1
Harvard	4
BYU	1
Tulsa	5
Mississippi State	2
Southern California	5
Seton Hall	1
Southern Illinois	5
Texas–Pan American	4

Upper round 2
Harvard	8
Tulsa	9
Southern California	3
Southern Illinois	8
Lower round 1
BYU	3
Mississippi State	1
Seton Hall	2
Texas–Pan American	8

Upper final
Tulsa	9
Southern Illinois	4
Lower round 2
Southern California	8
BYU	6
Harvard	0
Texas–Pan American	1

Semifinals
Tulsa	4
Southern California	8
Southern Illinois	8
Texas–Pan American	6

Preliminary final
Southern California	3
Tulsa	2

Final
Southern California	7
Southern Illinois	2
