= Orlando Peña =

Cuban baseball player (born 1933)

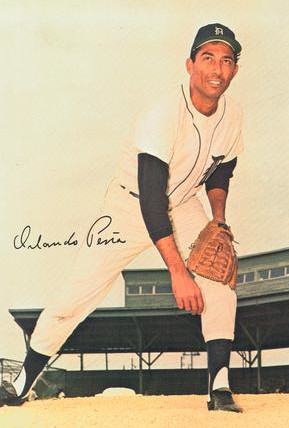
- Peña in 1966
- Pitcher
- Born: November 17, 1933 (age 92); Las Tunas, Cuba
- Batted: Right Threw: Right

MLB debut
- August 24, 1958, for the Cincinnati Redlegs

Last MLB appearance
- May 1, 1975, for the California Angels

MLB statistics
- Win–loss record: 56–77
- Earned run average: 3.71
- Strikeouts: 818
- Stats at Baseball Reference

Teams
- Cincinnati Redlegs / Reds (1958–1960); Kansas City Athletics (1962–1965); Detroit Tigers (1965–1967); Cleveland Indians (1967); Pittsburgh Pirates (1970); Baltimore Orioles (1971, 1973); St. Louis Cardinals (1973–1974); California Angels (1974–1975)

Member of the Caribbean

Baseball Hall of Fame
- Induction: 2000

Orlando Gregorio Peña Guevara (born November 17, 1933) is a Cuban former professional baseball pitcher. The right-hander played in Major League Baseball for all or parts of 14 seasons between 1958 and 1975 for the Cincinnati Reds, Kansas City Athletics, Detroit Tigers, Cleveland Indians, Pittsburgh Pirates, Baltimore Orioles, St. Louis Cardinals and California Angels. Born in Victoria de Las Tunas, he was listed as 5 feet 11 inches (1.80 m) tall and 154 pounds (70 kg).

== Baseball career ==
Peña was one of many Cuban players who entered the Cincinnati Redlegs' minor league system in the mid-1950s when the National League club affiliated with the Havana Sugar Kings of the Triple-A International League. After four successful years in the Florida State, Carolina and International leagues, he was recalled by Cincinnati in August 1958 and was the winning pitcher in his MLB debut on August 24. Coming into a game against the Los Angeles Dodgers in relief in the eighth inning with the Redlegs trailing 5–4, he held the Dodgers to one hit and no runs and struck out three in two full innings of work. When Cincinnati's Frank Robinson hit a two-run home run in the ninth inning, Peña emerged as the winning hurler. He also earned the first three saves of his MLB career before the 1958 campaign ended.

Peña spent all of 1959 on the Cincinnati roster, and got into 46 games. But his effectiveness declined, and he would bounce between Triple-A and the majors for the next three seasons. Acquired by the Kansas City Athletics in August 1962, Peña was plugged into the second-division team's starting rotation and won six of ten decisions, posted a solid 3.01 earned run average and threw six complete games, including a three-hit shutout against the Angels on August 29. He continued to take a turn in the Kansas City rotation for the next two seasons and won a dozen games each year for the struggling Athletics, but he also led the American League in games lost (20) in 1963 and home runs allowed (40) in 1964. When he lost his first six decisions of 1965, Peña was waived to the Tigers, where he became an effective relief pitcher through the end of 1966.

In 1967, Peña registered a career-high eight saves for the Tigers and Indians with an earned run average of 3.59, but Cleveland sent him back to the minors in 1968 and Peña would not return to the majors until June 1970 when he signed as a free agent with the Pirates. Working out of the Pittsburgh bullpen, he was successful for his first month with club, but rocky outings during August ruined his Pirate tenure and he was released August 26. The 37-year-old Peña was not ready to retire, however. He signed with the Baltimore Orioles' organization for 1971 and was highly effective in minor league assignments (winning 33 games, losing eight, and posting a brilliant 1.14 earned run average in 317 innings pitched) through 1972. He was mediocre in two trials for the Orioles, but, upon being acquired by the Cardinals on June 15, 1973, he became a key part of the Redbirds' bullpen, appearing in 84 games and notching nine wins and seven saves with a 2.36 ERA before being sent to his final MLB destination, the Angels, in September 1974. The Angels released him the following May, but Peña continued pitching in the minors for the next two seasons, and made an abbreviated comeback at age 45 with the Miami Amigos in the 1979 Triple-A Inter-American League. His professional pitching career in organized baseball encompassed 22 years.

In all or parts of 14 major league seasons, Peña posted a 56–77 record with 818 strikeouts and a 3.71 ERA in 427 games pitched, including 93 starts, 21 complete games, four shutouts, 40 saves, and 1,202 innings pitched.

After his playing retirement, Peña was a scout for the Tigers and Chicago White Sox.

== See also ==
- 1960 Caribbean Baseball World Series
- 1970 Caribbean Baseball World Series
- List of Major League Baseball players from Cuba
