= 1971 Seton Hall Pirates baseball team =

American college baseball season

1971 Seton Hall Pirates baseball

Metro Conference Playoff champions District II champions

College World Series, T-7th
- Conference: Metropolitan Intercollegiate Conference
- Record: 17–14 (8–5 Metro)
- Head coach: Ownie Carroll (25th season)
- Home stadium: Owen T. Carroll Field

1971 Metropolitan Intercollegiate Conference baseball standings
| | Conf. | | | | | | Overall |
| Team | W | | L | | T | PCT | W | | L | | T | PCT |
|---|---|---|---|---|---|---|---|---|---|---|---|---|
| Iona ‍†‍‍ | 10 | – | 2 | – | 0 | .833 | 19 | – | 5 | – | 0 | .792 |
| St. John's ‍‍‍ | 7 | – | 3 | – | 0 | .700 | 24 | – | 5 | – | 1 | .817 |
| No. 8 Seton Hall ‍‍‍^{y} | 8 | – | 5 | – | 0 | .615 | 17 | – | 14 | – | 0 | .548 |
| Manhattan ‍‍‍ | 8 | – | 5 | – | 0 | .615 | 14 | – | 8 | – | 1 | .630 |
| LIU ‍‍‍ | 6 | – | 6 | – | 0 | .500 | 12 | – | 11 | – | 0 | .522 |
| St. Francis (NY) ‍‍‍ | 5 | – | 6 | – | 0 | .455 | 12 | – | 11 | – | 0 | .522 |
| Wagner ‍‍‍ | 4 | – | 8 | – | 0 | .333 | 7 | – | 13 | – | 0 | .350 |
| C. W. Post ‍‍‍ | 3 | – | 6 | – | 0 | .333 | 12 | – | 11 | – | 0 | .522 |
| CCNY ‍‍‍ | 3 | – | 6 | – | 0 | .333 | 0 | – | 0 | – | 0 | – |
| Fairleigh Dickinson ‍‍‍ | 3 | – | 10 | – | 0 | .231 | 10 | – | 16 | – | 0 | .385 |
† – Conference champion y – Invited to the NCAA tournament As of June 17, 1971; Rankings from Collegiate Baseball

The 1971 Seton Hall Pirates baseball team represented Seton Hall University in the 1971 NCAA University Division baseball season. The Pirates played their home games at Owen T. Carroll Field. The team was coached by Ownie Carroll in his 25th year as head coach at Seton Hall.

The Pirates won the District II Playoff to advance to the College World Series, where they were defeated by the Texas–Pan American Broncs.

== Roster ==
1971 Seton Hall Pirates baseball team
Players
Coaches

| # | Pos. | Name | B/T | Height | Weight | Year | Home town |
|---|---|---|---|---|---|---|---|
| | INF | Abate | / | — | — |
| | C | Steve Baris | / | — | — |
| | | Marty Caffrey | / | — | — |
| | OF | Paul Caffrey | / | — | — |
| | | Gary Cavallo | / | — | — |
| | P | L Cavallo | / | — | — |
| | P | Jack Donavon | / | — | — |
| | | Famiglietti | / | — | — |
| | OF | Joe Flannery | / | — | — |
| | INF | Joe Gallo | / | — | — |
| | INF | Garcia | / | — | — |
| | P | Tom Griesmeyer | / | — | — |
| | INF | Kelly | / | — | — |
| | INF | Jim Lammers | / | — | — |
| | RHP | Dan Miele | /R | — | — |
| | INF | Stanchak | / | — | — |
| | C | Kevin Tennant | / | — | — |
| | OF | Kevin Toohill | / | — | — |

Head coach

Ownie Carroll

Assistant coach(es)

Legend

- (C) Team captain
- (S) Suspended
- (I) Ineligible
- Injured
- Current redshirt

== Schedule ==
1971 Seton Hall Pirates baseball game log
Regular season
March (1–1)

| # | Date | Opponent | Site/stadium | Score | Overall record | Metro record |
|---|---|---|---|---|---|---|
| 1 | March | Fairleigh Dickinson | Unknown • Unknown | 2–3 | 0–1 | 0–1 |
| 2 | March | Wagner | Unknown • Unknown | 7–6 | 1–1 | 1–1 |

April (8–8)

| # | Date | Opponent | Site/stadium | Score | Overall record | Metro record |
|---|---|---|---|---|---|---|
| 3 | April 2 | at Rutgers | Unknown • Piscataway, New Jersey | 5–8 | 1–2 | 1–1 |
| 4 | April | St. Francis (NY) | Unknown • Unknown | 5–0 | 2–2 | 2–1 |
| 5 | April | Rider | Unknown • Unknown | 6–10 | 2–3 | 2–1 |
| 6 | April | St. John's | Owen T. Carroll Field • South Orange, New Jersey | 0–3 | 2–4 | 2–2 |
| 7 | April | C. W. Post | Unknown • Unknown | 8–2 | 3–4 | 3–2 |
| 8 | April | Fordham | Unknown • Unknown | 6–5 | 4–4 | 3–2 |
| 9 | April | Ithaca | Unknown • Unknown | 1–4 | 4–5 | 3–2 |
| 10 | April | Fairleigh Dickinson | Unknown • Unknown | 3–2 | 5–5 | 4–2 |
| 11 | April 18 | Rutgers | Owen T. Carroll Field • South Orange, New Jersey | 7–2 | 6–5 | 4–2 |
| 12 | April | Wagner | Unknown • Unknown | 4–0 | 7–5 | 5–2 |
| 13 | April | St. Francis (NY) | Unknown • Unknown | 11–5 | 8–5 | 6–2 |
| 14 | April | NYU | Unknown • Unknown | 2–9 | 8–6 | 6–2 |
| 15 | April | Manhattan | Unknown • Unknown | 1–7 | 8–7 | 6–3 |
| 16 | April 25 | Villanova | Owen T. Carroll Field • South Orange, New Jersey | 8–9 | 8–8 | 6–3 |
| 17 | April | St. Peter's | Unknown • Unknown | 9–8 | 9–8 | 6–3 |
| 18 | April | Manhattan | Unknown • Unknown | 2–4 | 9–9 | 6–4 |

May (3–2)

| # | Date | Opponent | Site/stadium | Score | Overall record | Metro record |
|---|---|---|---|---|---|---|
| 19 | May | CCNY | Unknown • Unknown | 15–1 | 10–9 | 6–4 |
| 20 | May | Iona | Unknown • Unknown | 4–5 | 10–10 | 6–5 |
| 21 | May | Army | Unknown • Unknown | 3–8 | 10–11 | 6–5 |
| 22 | May | LIU Brooklyn | Unknown • Unknown | 5–1 | 11–11 | 7–5 |
| 23 | May | Manhattan | Unknown • Unknown | – | 12–11 | 8–5 |

Postseason
Metro Conference Playoff (2–1)

| # | Date | Opponent | Site/stadium | Score | Overall record | Metro record |
|---|---|---|---|---|---|---|
| 24 | May | Iona | Unknown • Unknown | 1–2 | 12–12 | 8–5 |
| 25 | May | Iona | Unknown • Unknown | 6–1 | 13–12 | 8–5 |
| 26 | May | Iona | Unknown • Unknown | 15–6 | 14–12 | 8–5 |

NCAA District II Playoff (3–0)

| # | Date | Opponent | Site/stadium | Score | Overall record | Metro record |
|---|---|---|---|---|---|---|
| 27 | May | vs Buffalo | Bill Clarke Field • Princeton, New Jersey | 3–1 | 15–12 | 8–5 |
| 28 | May | vs Saint Joseph's | Bill Clarke Field • Princeton, New Jersey | 8–1 | 16–12 | 8–5 |
| 29 | May | Saint Joseph's | Bill Clarke Field • Princeton, New Jersey | 4–1 | 17–12 | 8–5 |

College World Series (0–2)

| # | Date | Opponent | Site/stadium | Score | Overall record | Metro record |
|---|---|---|---|---|---|---|
| 30 | June 8 | vs Southern California | Omaha Municipal Stadium • Omaha, Nebraska | 1–5 | 17–13 | 8–5 |
| 31 | June 10 | vs Texas–Pan American | Omaha Municipal Stadium • Omaha, Nebraska | 2–8 | 17–14 | 8–5 |
