= Mike Eden (baseball) =

Panamanian baseball player (born 1949)

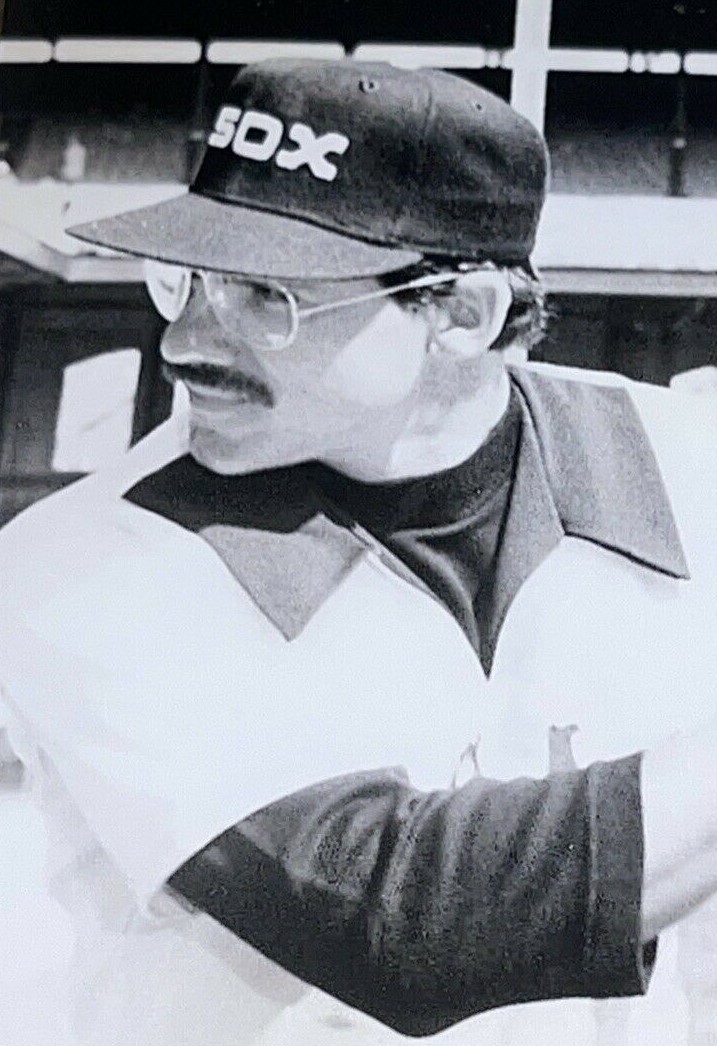
- Second baseman / Shortstop
- Born: May 22, 1949 (age 77); Fort Clayton, Panama Canal Zone
- Batted: Right Threw: Right

MLB debut
- August 2, 1976, for the Atlanta Braves

Last MLB appearance
- September 11, 1978, for the Chicago White Sox

MLB statistics
- Batting average: .080
- Hits: 2
- At bats: 25
- Runs batted in: 1
- Stats at Baseball Reference

Teams
- Atlanta Braves (1976); Chicago White Sox (1978)

Edward Michael Eden (born May 22, 1949) is an American former Major League Baseball (MLB) infielder who played for the Atlanta Braves in 1976 and the Chicago White Sox in 1978.

== Amateur career ==
Eden has the distinction of being the only major leaguer born in Fort Clayton, a former US military base on the Pacific side of the Panama Canal.

Eden attended George D. Chamberlain High School in Tampa, Florida where he played for the school's baseball team with future Major Leaguers Steve Garvey and Tom Walker. He began his college baseball career at Brevard Community College and continued it at Southern Illinois University.

At Southern Illinois, he was a member of the Southern Illinois Salukis baseball team and was selected third baseman to the All-Tournament Team of the 1971 College World Series. In 1970 and 1971, he played collegiate summer baseball with the Orleans Cardinals of the Cape Cod Baseball League, and won the league's batting title in 1970.

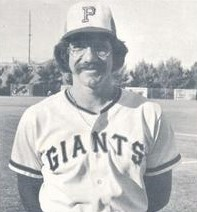
Eden with the Phoenix Giants in 1975

== Professional career ==
Signed by the San Francisco Giants in 1972, Eden was acquired by the Atlanta Braves in 1976 as part of a five-player trade. He appeared in five games with Atlanta in that season before joining the Chicago White Sox in 1978, and also spent part of three seasons in Triple-A with the Iowa Oaks (1978) and Rochester Red Wings (1979–1980).

In two major league seasons, Eden posted a .080 batting average (2-for-25) and scored a run in 15 games. He hit .269 (251-for-932) in 266 minor league games, including 16 home runs, 114 RBI, and a .363 on-base percentage.

== Personal life ==
Eden married Lorraine Hey of New York in August 1980 while he was playing for the Rochester Red Wings.

== See also ==
- 1976 Atlanta Braves season
- 1978 Chicago White Sox season
- List of players from Panama in Major League Baseball
