= Lance Rhodes =

American baseball player and coach

Current position
- Title: Head coach
- Team: Southern Illinois
- Conference: Missouri Valley
- Record: 203–113
- Annual salary: $170,000

Biographical details
- Born: August 8, 1985 (age 40); Sikeston, Missouri

Playing career
- 2005–2006: Saint Louis
- 2007–2008: Southeast Missouri State
- Position: Pitcher

Coaching career (HC unless noted)
- 2010–2012: Wabash Valley College (asst)
- 2013–2016: Southeast Missouri State (asst)
- 2017–2019: Missouri (asst)
- 2020–present: Southern Illinois

Head coaching record
- Overall: 203–113
- Tournaments: NCAA: 0–0

Lance Rhodes is an American baseball coach and former pitcher. He is the head baseball coach at Southern Illinois University Carbondale. Rhodes played Saint Louis University in 2005 through 2006 and at Southeast Missouri State University from 2007 to 2008.

In 2019, Rhodes was named the head coach of the Southern Illinois Salukis baseball program.

Statistics overview
Season	Team	Overall	Conference	Standing	Postseason
Southern Illinois Salukis (Missouri Valley Conference) (2020–present)
2020	Southern Illinois	12–6	0–0		Season canceled due to COVID-19
2021	Southern Illinois	40–20	15–13	4th	MVC Tournament
2022	Southern Illinois	44–16	16-5	1st	MVC Tournament
2023	Southern Illinois	37-24	15-12	T-3rd	MVC Tournament
2024	Southern Illinois	33-27	12-15	6th	MVC Tournament
2025	Southern Illinois	37-20	16-11	T–3rd	MVC Tournament
Southern Illinois:		203–113	74–56		
Total:		203–113			
National champion Postseason invitational champion Conference regular season champion Conference regular season and conference tournament champion Division regular season champion Division regular season and conference tournament champion Conference tournament champion

== See also ==
- List of current NCAA Division I baseball coaches
