= Rogers Lehew =

American and Canadian football executive (1928–2021)

Profile
- Position: Guard

Personal information
- Born: July 30, 1928; Corsicana, Texas, U.S.
- Died: March 16, 2021 (aged 92); Calgary, Alberta, Canada

Career history

Playing
- 1946–1949: Tulsa Golden Hurricane

Coaching
- 1953–1955: Tulsa Golden Hurricane (baseball)

Operations
- 1965–1974: Calgary Stampeders (GM)

Rogers Lehew (July 30, 1928 – March 16, 2021) was an American and Canadian football executive. He served as the general manager of the Calgary Stampeders from 1965 to 1974. He went on to become vice president and assistant general manager of the Detroit Lions.

Lehew graduated from the University of Tulsa, where he played for the Tulsa Golden Hurricane. After a stint in the air force, he returned to his alma mater and coached its football and baseball teams. He started working for the Stampeders in 1960 and was appointed general manager at the end of 1964. During Lehew's nine-season tenure, the franchise won the 1971 Grey Cup. He subsequently moved to the Lions in 1974, before retiring as an executive four years later and returning to Calgary.

== Early life ==
Lehew was born in Corsicana, Texas, on July 30, 1928. He studied at the University of Tulsa, obtaining a Bachelor of Arts in 1950. During his time there, he played on the American football and baseball teams, and lettered four and three times, respectively. He was a guard for the Tulsa Golden Hurricane from 1946 until 1949. He became one of only two players to qualify for the varsity football team as a true freshman, and contributed to the team's 9–1 record during his first season. In his final year, he was appointed team captain and honored as its best lineman. He led the team to one of their most notable upsets that same year, with their victory over Villanova.

Lehew first stint in coaching came with a high school football team in Tulsa, Oklahoma, overseeing their perfect season in 1950. He concurrently undertook postgraduate studies and earned a master's degree in educational administration in 1951. He joined the United States Air Force that same year and played on its football team at Carswell Air Force Base in Fort Worth, Texas, until 1952. Upon completing his military service, Lehew returned to Tulsa and worked as an assistant football coach at his alma mater in 1953, as well as its head baseball coach. He served in those capacities for two seasons.

== Career ==
Lehew was invited to the Calgary Stampeders training camp in 1959 as a guest coach. He joined the Canadian Football League (CFL) franchise on a permanent basis the following season, working as coordinator of minor football development and as an assistant to the general manager. He was subsequently promoted to general manager in November 1964, succeeding Jim Finks. Lehew was responsible for signing players like Wayne Harris, Herm Harrison, John Helton, Jerry Keeling, Earl Lunsford, Don Luzzi, Larry Robinson, and Harvey Wylie (all of whom were elected to the Canadian Football Hall of Fame), and for turning the Stampeders into a competitive team. During his tenure, the Stampeders made three appearances in Grey Cup games and won the championship in 1971, the franchise's second Grey Cup. He was influential in starting the team tradition of featuring a horse at the sidelines during games at McMahon Stadium. This was the precursor to Quick Six the Touchdown Horse. He also created the Presidents’ Ring in 1967, to honour the player who "best demonstrates excellence on and off the field as voted by the players". He oversaw the inclusion of the white horse to Stampeders helmets.

Lehew left the Stampeders in 1974. He proceeded to serve as the vice president and assistant general manager of the Detroit Lions of the National Football League from that year until 1978. He was inducted into the Tulsa Athletics Hall of Fame in 1997. He was subsequently honoured by the Stampeders on their Wall of Fame in 2004.

== Head coaching record ==
=== College baseball ===
Record table
Season	Team	Overall	Conference	Standing	Postseason
Tulsa Golden Hurricane (Missouri Valley Conference) (1953–1955)
1953	Tulsa	11–6			
1954	Tulsa	11–10			
1955	Tulsa	6–12			
Tulsa:		28–28 (.500)			
Total:		28–28 (.500)			
National champion Postseason invitational champion Conference regular season champion Conference regular season and conference tournament champion Division regular season champion Division regular season and conference tournament champion Conference tournament champion

== Personal life ==
Lehew was married to Joann until her death. Together, they had three children: Garry, Lora, and Larry.

After Lehew stopped working as a football executive in 1978, he returned to Calgary. He was subsequently employed at an oil patch until his retirement in 1997, and also engaged in other business interests. He died on March 16, 2021, in Calgary at the age of 92.
