= Paul Gregory (baseball) =

American baseball player (1908–1999)

- Pitcher
- Born: June 9, 1908; Tomnolen, Mississippi, U.S.
- Died: September 16, 1999 (aged 91); Southaven, Mississippi, U.S.
- Batted: Right Threw: Right

MLB debut
- April 20, 1932, for the Chicago White Sox

Last MLB appearance
- September 24, 1933, for the Chicago White Sox
- Stats at Baseball Reference

Teams
- Chicago White Sox (1932–1933)

Paul Edwin Gregory [Pop] (June 9, 1908 – September 16, 1999) was an American professional baseball pitcher in Major League Baseball who played from 1932 through 1933 for the Chicago White Sox. Listed at 6 ft 2 in (1.88 m), 180 lb, he batted and threw right-handed.

Born in Tomnolen, Mississippi, Paul Gregory was a three-sport star at Mississippi State University, lettering in football, basketball and baseball from 1926 to 1930.

After graduating, Gregory spent thirty five years in baseball as a player and college coach. He also coached college basketball for nine years and was a World War II veteran.

Gregory started his professional baseball career in 1931 with Class-A Atlanta Crackers, posting an 8–6 record and a 5.17 earned run average in 45 games (11 starts).

With the White Sox in 1932 and 1933, Gregory was just 9–14 with a 4.72 ERA. His career highlight came on May 26, 1933, when he defeated Red Ruffing and the host New York Yankees, 8–6, allowing one earned run in seven-plus innings while retiring Babe Ruth in five at-bats.

Following his majors stint, Gregory returned to play on the minor league system for nine years before serving in the US Navy during World War II, from 1943 to 1945. After military discharge he pitched for Triple-A Seattle Rainiers and Hollywood Stars between 1946 and 1947.

After his playing retirement, Gregory began his coaching career in 1947.

Gregory was in charge of the basketball squad from 1947 to 1955, then he led the Bulldogs baseball team to 15 winning seasons from 1954 through 1974, including four Southeastern Conference titles (1965–66, 1970–71) and a berth to the 1971 College World Series.

A four-time SEC Coach of the Year, Gregory was inducted into the American Baseball Coaches Association Hall of Fame in 1977 and the Mississippi Sports Hall of Fame and Museum in 1982.

Paul Gregory died in Southaven, Mississippi, at the age of 91.

== MLB statistics ==
GP	W	L	W-L%	ERA	GS	GF	CG	IP	H	RA	ER	HR	BB	SO
56	9	14	.391	4.72	26	16	8	221⅓	249	150	116	18	98	57

== Head coaching record ==
=== Baseball ===
Record table
Season	Team	Overall	Conference	Standing	Postseason
Mississippi State Bulldogs (Southeastern Conference) (1957–1974)
1957	Mississippi State	13–5	10–5		
1958	Mississippi State	14–10	8–6		
1959	Mississippi State	12–13	5–10		
1960	Mississippi State	16–11	8–8		
1961	Mississippi State	12–7	7–6		
1962	Mississippi State	21–5–1	14–1–1	1st (West)	
1963	Mississippi State	17–11	9–7		
1964	Mississippi State	17–12	7–7		
1965	Mississippi State	16–10	11–4	1st	NCAA District III tournament
1966	Mississippi State	20–11	11–4	1st	NCAA District III tournament
1967	Mississippi State	17–14	9–9		
1968	Mississippi State	16–17	7–10		
1969	Mississippi State	20–10	11–7		
1970	Mississippi State	32–8	11–4	1st	NCAA District III tournament
1971	Mississippi State	32–12	13–5	1st	NCAA District III tournament, College World Series
1972	Mississippi State	24–16	7–11	6th	
1973	Mississippi State	16–14	5–9	9th	
1974	Mississippi State	13–14	8–9	6th	
Mississippi State:		328–200–1 (.621)	161–113 (.588)		
Total:		328–161–1 (.670)			
National champion Postseason invitational champion Conference regular season champion Conference regular season and conference tournament champion Division regular season champion Division regular season and conference tournament champion Conference tournament champion

=== Basketball ===
Record table
Season	Team	Overall	Conference	Standing	Postseason
Mississippi State Bulldogs (Southeastern Conference) (1947–1955)
1947–48	Mississippi State	6–12	6–10	9th	
1948–49	Mississippi State	4–13	3–12	12th	
1949–50	Mississippi State	7–11	6–10	10th	
1950–51	Mississippi State	3–16	2–12	12th	
1951–52	Mississippi State	12–11	4–10	10th	
1952–53	Mississippi State	9–10	5–8	T–7th	
1953–54	Mississippi State	11–10	5–9	T–8th	
1954–55	Mississippi State	16–17	2–12	12th	
Mississippi State:		58–100 (.367)	33–83 (.284)		
Total:		58–100 (.367)			
