= Jim Tyrone =

American baseball player (born 1949)

- Outfielder
- Born: January 29, 1949 (age 77); Alice, Texas, U.S.
- Batted: Right Threw: Right

Professional debut
- MLB: August 27, 1972, for the Chicago Cubs
- NPB: July 27, 1979, for the Seibu Lions

Last appearance
- MLB: October 2, 1977, for the Oakland Athletics
- NPB: October 9, 1982, for the Nankai Hawks

MLB statistics
- Batting average: .227
- Home runs: 8
- Runs batted in: 32

NPB statistics
- Batting average: .287
- Home runs: 74
- Runs batted in: 200
- Stats at Baseball Reference

Teams
- Chicago Cubs (1972, 1974–1975); Oakland Athletics (1977); Seibu Lions (1979–1980); Nankai Hawks (1981–1982)

James Vernon Tyrone (born January 29, 1949) is an American former professional baseball outfielder. He played all or part of four seasons in Major League Baseball (MLB) from 1972 to 1977, for the Chicago Cubs and Oakland Athletics. He also played four seasons in Nippon Professional Baseball (NPB) from 1979 to 1982, for the Seibu Lions and Nankai Hawks.

Jim's brother, Wayne Tyrone, also played in the major leagues for the Cubs in 1976. Despite being in the same organization for four-plus seasons, the two were never teammates at any level, until playing together for the 1979 Miami Amigos..

In 1983, Jim appeared on the American television game show The Price Is Right and briefly talked about his time in baseball.

== Personal life ==
Jim was the oldest of five kids (Wayne Tyrone, JoEtta Duncan, Lenoard Tyrone) of the late Ora Lee and Oscar Lee Tyrone, who married in 1948 and divorced in 1974. Oscar remarried to Norma Jean in 1975 in which Jon Tyrone was born in that union. Tyrone married Lamar Casas in 1982 (divorced 1992) and resided in Pasadena, California upon his return to Texas in 1993. He has five children: Dal Davenport (from a previous relationship), Marquita Tyrone, Maegan Tyrone, Sommer Tyrone, and Allison Tyrone along with seven grandchildren (3 girls and 4 boys). He currently lives in Arlington, Texas where he privately instructed kids with their batting before his retirement.
