= 1971 USC Trojans baseball team =

American college baseball season

1971 USC Trojans baseball

National champions Pacific-8 Conference champions
- Conference: Pacific-8 Conference
- CB: No. 1
- Record: 46–11 (17–0 Pac-8)
- Head coach: Rod Dedeaux (30th year)
- Home stadium: Bovard Field

1971 Pacific-8 Conference baseball standings
	Conf.				Overall
Team	W		L	PCT	W		L	PCT
Northern Division
No. 19 Washington State ^{x}‍‍‍	7	–	8	.467	34	–	15	.694
Oregon ‍‍‍	7	–	9	.438		–		–
Oregon State ‍‍‍	6	–	10	.375		–		–
Washington ‍‍‍	1	–	14	.067	9	–	19	.321
Southern Division
No. 1 Southern California ^{x}‍‍‍^{y}	17	–	0	1.000	46	–	11	.807
Stanford ‍‍‍	11	–	6	.647	39	–	20	.661
UCLA ‍‍‍	11	–	6	.647	38	–	17	.691
California ‍‍‍	5	–	12	.294	24	–	24	.500
† – Conference champion y – Invited to the NCAA tournament As of June 30, 1971; Rankings from Collegiate Baseball

The 1971 USC Trojans baseball team represented the University of Southern California in the 1971 NCAA University Division baseball season. The team was coached Rod Dedeaux in his 30th season.

The Trojans won the College World Series, defeating the Southern Illinois Salukis in the championship game, winning their second of five consecutive national championships, and third in four years.

== Roster ==
1971 USC Trojans roster
Pitchers: Steve Busby; Tim Coffin; Jim George; Eric Raich; Randy Scarbery; Mark Sogge; Chris Vella; Greg Widman	Infielders: Frank Alfano; George Ambrow; Daryl Arenstein; Mike Ball; Milt Guggia; Jeff Port; Tim Steele	Outfielders: Gordon Carter; Dick Cross; Fred Lynn; Jeff Pederson; Catchers: Sam Ceci; Craig Perkins; Mike Swiderski; Coaches: Rod Dedeaux

== Schedule ==
1971 USC Trojans baseball game log
Regular season
February/March

Date	Opponent	Score	Overall record	Pac-8 record
February 24	at Cal Poly Pomona	16–5	1–0	–
February 26	at UC Santa Barbara	5–6	1–1	–
March 2	at San Fernando Valley State	13–10	2–1	–
March 5	UC Santa Barbara	5–6	2–2	–
March 6	Cal Poly Pomona	3–5	2–3	–
March 6	Cal Poly Pomona	9–3	3–3	–
March 9	UC Irvine	3–2	4–3	–
March 12	at UC Irvine	9–10	4–4	–
March 13	Loyola Marymount	3–0	5–4	–
March 13	Loyola Marymount	8–2	6–4	–
March 16	San Fernando Valley State	1–0	7–4	–
March 17	at Chapman	6–7	7–5	–
March 20	BYU	8–4	8–5	–
March 20	BYU	8–1	9–5	–
March 23	Pepperdine	2–1	10–5	–
March 24	Utah	8–3	11–5	–
March 26	San Diego State	4–2	12–5	–
March 27	San Diego State	1–3	12–6	–
March 27	San Diego State	9–2	13–6	–
March 31	Westmont	2–5	13–7	–

April

Date	Opponent	Score	Overall record	Pac-8 record
April 2	at Hawaii	6–1	14–7	–
April 7	at Hawaii	8–0	15–7	–
April 13	at UCLA	7–1	16–7	1–0
April 16	California	10–1	17–7	2–0
April 17	Stanford	3–1	18–7	3–0
April 17	Stanford	8–4	19–7	4–0
April 20	Chapman	6–2	20–7	–
April 23	at Stanford	2–1	21–7	5–0
April 24	at California	2–1	22–7	6–0
April 24	at California	10–0	23–7	7–0
April 27	Cal State Los Angeles	7–4	24–7	–
April 30	Oregon	5–0	25–7	8–0
April 30	Oregon	2–0	26–7	9–0

May

Date	Opponent	Score	Overall record	Pac-8 record
May 1	Oregon State	10–4	27–7	10–0
May 1	Oregon State	9–6	28–7	11–0
May 3	at Long Beach State	6–1	29–7	–
May 4	Long Beach State	1–5	29–8	–
May 7	at Washington State	4–0	30–8	12–0
May 7	at Washington State	7–6	31–8	13–0
May 8	at Washington	6–0	32–8	14–0
May 8	at Washington	2–0	33–8	15–0
May 11	Cal State Los Angeles	4–2	34–8	–
May 14	UCLA	1–0	35–8	16–0
May 15	at UCLA	6–3	36–8	17–0

Postseason
NCAA tournament: Pacific-8 playoffs

Date	Opponent	Site/stadium	Score	Overall record
May 20	vs. Oregon State	Buck Bailey Field	6–2	37–8
May 21	vs. Stanford	Buck Bailey Field	9–3	38–8
May 22	vs. Washington State	Buck Bailey Field	5–10	38–9
May 22	vs. Washington State	Buck Bailey Field	6–3	39–9

NCAA tournament: District 8 playoffs

Date	Opponent	Site/stadium	Score	Overall record
May 29	vs. Santa Clara	Buck Shaw Stadium	5–6	39–10
May 30	vs. Santa Clara	Bovard Field	5–1	40–10
May 30	vs. Santa Clara	Bovard Field	9–1	41–10

NCAA tournament: College World Series

Date	Opponent	Site/stadium	Score	Overall record
June 12	vs. Seton Hall	Rosenblatt Stadium	5–1	42–10
June 13	vs. Southern Illinois	Rosenblatt Stadium	3–8	42–11
June 14	vs. BYU	Rosenblatt Stadium	8–6	43–11
June 15	vs. Tulsa	Rosenblatt Stadium	8–4	44–11
June 16	vs. Tulsa	Rosenblatt Stadium	3–2	45–11
June 17	vs. Southern Illinois	Rosenblatt Stadium	7–2	46–11

== Awards and honors ==
Frank Alfano

- College World Series All-Tournament Team

George Ambrow

- All-Pacific-8 First Team

Mike Ball

- All-Pacific-8 First Team

Steve Busby

- All-America First Team
- All-Pacific-8 First Team

Fredd Lynn

- College World Series All-Tournament Team

Craig Perkins

- All-Pacific-8 First Team

Jeff Port

- All-Pacific-8 First Team

Mark Sogge

- College World Series All-Tournament Team
- All-Pacific-8 First Team

Tim Steele

- All-Pacific-8 First Team

== Trojans in the 1971 MLB draft ==
The following members of the USC baseball program were drafted in the 1971 Major League Baseball draft.

=== June regular draft ===
Player	Position	Round	Overall	MLB Team
Jim George	RHP	13th	312th	Oakland Athletics
Craig Perkins	C	14th	324th	Kansas City Royals
Sam Ceci	C	40th	778th	Los Angeles Dodgers

=== June secondary draft ===
Player	Position	Round	Overall	MLB Team
Gordon Carter	OF	2nd	34th	San Francisco Giants
Steve Busby	RHP	2nd	39th	Kansas City Royals
Mike Ball	3B	6th	80th	Minnesota Twins
