= Wayne Tyrone =

American baseball player (born 1950)

- Outfielder
- Born: August 1, 1950 (age 75); Alice, Texas, U.S.
- Batted: Right Threw: Right

MLB debut
- July 15, 1976, for the Chicago Cubs

Last MLB appearance
- September 26, 1976, for the Chicago Cubs

MLB statistics
- Batting average: .228
- Home runs: 1
- Runs batted in: 8
- Stats at Baseball Reference

Teams
- Chicago Cubs (1976)

Oscar Wayne Tyrone (born August 1, 1950) is an American former Major League Baseball player. He played in the 1976 baseball season with the Chicago Cubs. Tyrone batted and threw right-handed. He played in 30 games in his one-year career, having a .228 batting average. He is the brother of former Major Leaguer, Jim Tyrone.

Wayne has three children: Christina Tyrone-Davis, Deirdra Clement, and Travis Tyrone along with eight grandchildren (3 girls and 5 boys). He currently lives in Arlington, Texas with this wife Alma, where he instructs kids with their batting.
