= Jerry Tabb =

American baseball player (born 1952)

- First baseman
- Born: March 17, 1952 (age 73); Altus, Oklahoma, U.S.
- Batted: Left Threw: Right

MLB debut
- September 8, 1976, for the Chicago Cubs

Last MLB appearance
- May 29, 1978, for the Oakland Athletics

MLB statistics
- Batting average: .226
- Home runs: 6
- Runs batted in: 20
- Stats at Baseball Reference

Teams
- Chicago Cubs (1976); Oakland Athletics (1977–1978)
Medals
Men's baseball
Representing United States
Pan American Games
Silver medal – second place	1971 Cali	Team

Jerry Lynn Tabb (born March 17, 1952) is an American former professional baseball first baseman. He played all or part of three seasons in Major League Baseball (MLB) from 1976 until 1978, for the Chicago Cubs and Oakland Athletics.

== Amateur career ==
Tabb was a baseball standout at the University of Tulsa, where, as a freshman, he won the College World Series Most Outstanding Player award in the 1971 College World Series, where Tulsa was the next-to-last team eliminated. He was also the first baseman for Team USA at the 1971 Pan American Games.

== Professional career ==
The Cubs made Tabb a first-round pick, selected 16th overall, in the 1973 Major League Baseball draft. He debuted in the majors in September 1976, playing in 11 games for the Cubs and batting .292.

Tabb was purchased from the Cubs by the Athletics the following February, and in 1977 Tabb got an extended chance in the major leagues. The A's were cleaning house, and Tabb was one of five players who received substantial playing time at first base for the team. Tabb batted .222 with 6 home runs and 19 RBI in 51 games. The next season, however, Oakland acquired Dave Revering from the Cincinnati Reds and installed him as their regular first baseman. Tabb managed just 9 at-bats in 1978, his last season in the majors.

== Sources ==
- Career statistics from Baseball Reference · Baseball Reference (Minors) · Retrosheet · Baseball Almanac
