= Inter-American League =

- Sport: Minor league baseball
- Founded: 1978
- Founder: Roberto Maduro
- First season: 1979
- Folded: June 30, 1979
- No. of teams: Six (first half); Four (second half)
- Country: United States; Panama; Puerto Rico; Dominican Republic; Venezuela
- Last champion: Miami Amigos

The Inter-American League was a high-level circuit in Minor league baseball that lasted only three months before folding during the 1979 season.

The league was conceived both as an official Triple-A minor league circuit and member of the National Association of Professional Baseball Leagues. It was composed of six clubs unaffiliated with Major League Baseball farm systems.

The Inter-American loop was headed by Bobby Maduro, former owner of the Triple-A Havana Sugar Kings and a longtime scout and front-office executive active in Latin American countries and Major League Baseball.

A 130-game regular season was planned, while the six teams were located in the United States, Panama, Puerto Rico, the Dominican Republic and Venezuela(2). The league featured several well-known MLB veterans, with rosters averaging players between 26 and 29 years of age.

But the new circuit was barely able to complete half its schedule, fatally wounded by "under-capitalized owners, internecine rivalries among Caribbean baseball powers, tropical monsoons, and unreliable air travel."

On June 17, 1979, the Panama and Puerto Rico teams disbanded, leaving the league with only four clubs. Thirteen days later, the entire league folded. The Miami Amigos, led by future Major League manager Davey Johnson, were in first place with a 51–21 mark (.708) when the Inter-American League shut down.

== List of teams ==
- Caracas Metropolitanos (VEN)
- Panama Banqueros (PAN)
- Puerto Rico Boricuas (PUR)
- Petroleros de Zulia (VEN)
- Miami Amigos (USA)
- Santo Domingo Azucareros (DOM)

== Final standings ==
1979 Inter-American League final standings
Pos	Team	W	L	Pct	GB	Manager(s)
1	Miami Amigos	51	21	.708	–	Davey Johnson
2	Caracas Metropolitanos	37	27	.578	10	Jim Busby
3	Santo Domingo Azucareros	38	29	.567	10½	Mike Kekich
4	Petroleros de Zulia	31	36	.463	17½	Luis Aparicio / Gustavo Gil / Pat Dobson
5	Panama Banqueros	15	36	.294	25½	Willy Miranda
6	Puerto Rico Boricuas	16	39	.291	26½	José Santiago

== Bibliography ==
- Johnson, Lloyd; Wolff, Miles (1997). Encyclopedia of Minor League Baseball. Baseball America. ISBN 978-0-96-371898-3
- "The Over-the-Hill League". Sports Illustrated. June 4, 1979. Archived from the original on September 25, 2020.
