= Southern Illinois Salukis baseball =

Southern Illinois Salukis
- 2026 Southern Illinois Salukis baseball team
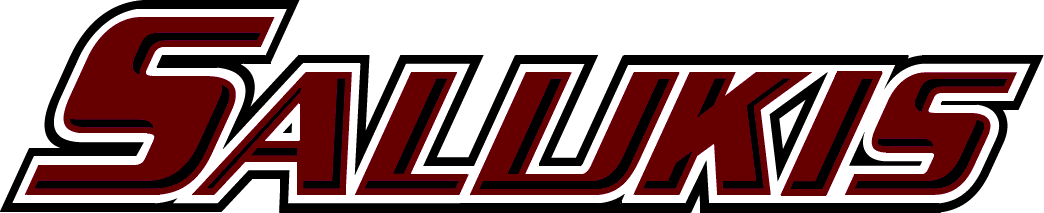
- Founded: 1947; 79 years ago
- University: Southern Illinois University
- Head coach: Lance Rhodes (7th season)
- Conference: MVC
- Location: Carbondale, IL
- Home stadium: Itchy Jones Stadium (capacity: 2,000)
- Nickname: Salukis
- Colors: Maroon and white

College World Series runner-up
- 1968, 1971

College World Series appearances
- 1968, 1969, 1971, 1974, 1977

NCAA regional champions
- 1977

NCAA tournament appearances
- 1966, 1967, 1968, 1969, 1970, 1971, 1973, 1974, 1976, 1977, 1978, 1981, 1986, 1990

Conference tournament champions
- 1977, 1978, 1981, 1990

Conference regular season champions
- 1975, 1976, 1977, 1978, 1981, 1984, 1986, 1990, 2022

The Southern Illinois Salukis baseball team represents Southern Illinois University in NCAA Division I college baseball. They are part of the Missouri Valley Conference. Twenty-four Saluki Baseball alumni have gone on to the Major Leagues.

== History ==
On June 20, 2019, Southern Illinois University Director of Athletics Jerry Kill announced Lance Rhodes as the program's new head coach. Rhodes is a Sikeston, Missouri, native, and joined the Saluki baseball program from the University of Missouri, where he had served as the head assistant and recruiting coordinator. Prior to his time at the University of Missouri, Rhodes served as the recruiting coordinator at Southeast Missouri State University; helping them to three years of program dominance by winning three straight Ohio Valley Conference championships (2014, 2015, 2016).

SIU baseball started as a club sport in 1921, lasting until 1924. From 1925 until 1946, the school did not have a baseball program.

In 1947, Abe Martin revived the program as an intercollegiate sport and it has remained ever since, being an elite program in the late 1960s through the 1980s.

SIU plays its home games at Itchy Jones Stadium.

== SIU in the NCAA tournament ==
SIU has history in the NCAA baseball tournament held in Omaha since 1950 and at Johnny Rosenblatt Stadium from 1950 through 2010. They won the College World Series 5 times and the national champion runner-up twice, losing to the University of Southern California Trojans both times and as third-place finishers twice.

Year	Record	Pct	Notes
1966	0–2	.000	Eliminated by Valparaiso
1967	1–2	.333	Eliminated by Western Michigan
1968	6–2	.750	Eliminated by USC in championship game College World Series (2nd place)
1969	3–2	.600	Eliminated by Ole Miss; College World Series (7th place)
1970	2–2	.500	Eliminated by Ohio
1971	7–3	.700	Eliminated by USC in championship game College World Series (2nd place)
1973	2–2	.500	Eliminated by Minnesota
1974	7–3	.500	Eliminated by USC in CWS semifinals College World Series (3rd place)
1976	0–2	.000	Eliminated by Michigan
1977	6–2	.750	Eliminated by Arizona State in CWS Semifinals College World Series (3rd place)
1978	2–2	.500	Eliminated by Oral Roberts
1981	1–2	.333	Eliminated by Oral Roberts
1986	1–2	.333	Eliminated by Texas
1990	2–2	.500	Eliminated by San Diego State
TOTALS	40–30	.571	

== Head coaches ==
Coach	Years	Record
Lance Rhodes	2020–present	166–93
Ken Henderson	2011–2019	241–294–1
Dan Callahan	1995–2010	442–447–1
Sam Riggelman	1991–1994	82–114–1
Itch Jones	1970–1990	738–345–5
Joe Lutz	1966–1969	130–48–2
Abe Martin	1947–1965	277–155–2
William McAndrew	1921–1924	20–6

== Notable former players ==
- Sam Coonrod, current Major League Baseball pitcher for the Philadelphia Phillies
- Jim Dwyer, Retired Major League Baseball outfielder
- Steve Finley, Retired Major League Baseball center fielder, 5-time Gold Glove winner, 2-time All-Star
- Jason Frasor, Major League Baseball pitcher for the Toronto Blue Jays, Chicago White Sox, Texas Rangers and Kansas City Royals
- Joe Hall, Retired Major League Baseball outfielder
- Jerry Hairston Jr., Major League Baseball second baseman for the San Diego Padres
- Duane Kuiper, Retired Major League Baseball second baseman, announcer, commentator for EA Sports baseball video games
- Al Levine, Former Major League Baseball pitcher currently pitching for the Newark Bears of the independent Atlantic League.
- Dan Radison, current Major League Baseball 1st base coach for the Washington Nationals
- Dave Stieb, Retired Major League Baseball pitcher, 7 Time All-Star, Pitched No-Hitter on September 2, 1990.
- Bill Stein, Retired Major League Baseball infielder
- Tristan Peters

== See also ==
- List of NCAA Division I baseball programs
