= Midwestern Conference =

- Association: NCAA
- Founded: 1970
- Folded: 1972
- Commissioner: Jack McClelland
- Sports fielded: 9; men's: 9
- Division: Division I
- Subdivision: non-football
- No. of teams: 5
- Headquarters: Indianapolis, Indiana
- Region: Midwestern United States

The Midwestern Conference, alternatively Conference of Midwestern Universities, was a college athletic conference which operated in Illinois and Indiana from 1970 to 1972. It was composed of schools which had recently moved from Division II (then known as the College Division) to Division I (known as the University Division) of the National Collegiate Athletic Association (NCAA). The conference sponsored only men's sports; awarding championships in baseball, basketball, cross-country, golf, swimming, tennis, indoor & outdoor track and field, and wrestling.

The first conference championship was in cross country in the fall of 1970. Southern Illinois won that championship and almost made a clean sweep by winning championships in basketball, wrestling, swimming, baseball, tennis, and both indoor and outdoor track. Only Ball State prevented a sweep by winning the golf championship that spring.

At that time (as is generally still the case now), in order to be recognized by the NCAA, a conference was required to have six or more member institutions. The Midwestern Conference had only five members and was unable to find a sixth, so it ceased operations after only two years. The five member schools eventually affiliated with other conferences.

The conference commissioner was Jack McClelland, the former Drake Bulldogs basketball coach and athletic director, who had resigned as commissioner of the North Central Conference in order to accept the position with the Midwestern Conference.

== Member schools ==
The onetime members of the Midwestern Conference and the conferences they later joined are:

Institution	Location	Founded	Affiliation	Nickname	Colors	Enrollment	Joined	Left	Subsequent conference(s)	Current conference
Ball State University	Muncie, Indiana	1918	Public	Cardinals		21,597	1970	1972	NCAA D-I Independent (1972–73)	Mid-American (MAC) (1973–present)
Illinois State University	Normal, Illinois	1857	Public	Redbirds		20,683	1970	1972	NCAA D-I Independent (1972–81)	Missouri Valley (MVC) (1981–present)
Indiana State University	Terre Haute, Indiana	1865	Public	Sycamores		13,584	1970	1972	NCAA D-I Independent (1972–76)	Missouri Valley (MVC) (1976–present)
Northern Illinois University	DeKalb, Illinois	1895	Public	Huskies		16,769	1970	1972	various (Note: Northern Illinois (NIU) had joined the following subsequent conferences: as an NCAA D-I Independent from 1972–73 to 1974–75, and again later from 1986–87 to 1989–90; the Mid-Continent Conference (now the Summit League) from 1990–91 to 1993–94; and the Midwestern Collegiate Conference (now the Horizon League) from 1994–95 to 1996–97.)	Mid-American (MAC) (1975–86; 1997–present)
Southern Illinois University	Carbondale, Illinois	1869	Public	Salukis		11,695	1970	1972	NCAA D-I Independent (1972–75)	Missouri Valley (MVC) (1975–present)

== Conference champions ==
=== Baseball ===
- 1971 Southern Illinois
- 1972 Northern Illinois

=== Basketball ===
- 1970–71 Southern Illinois
- 1971–72 Northern Illinois

=== Cross country ===
- 1970 Southern Illinois
- 1971 Ball State

=== Golf ===
- 1971 Ball State
- 1972 Ball State

=== Swimming ===
- 1970–71 Southern Illinois
- 1971–72 Southern Illinois

=== Tennis ===
- 1971 Southern Illinois
- 1972 Southern Illinois

=== Indoor track & field ===
- 1970–71 Southern Illinois
- 1971–72 Southern Illinois

=== Outdoor track & field ===
- 1971 Southern Illinois
- 1972 Southern Illinois

=== Wrestling ===
- 1970–71 Southern Illinois
- 1971–72 Southern Illinois
