= Tulsa Golden Hurricane baseball =

Former baseball team representing the University of Tulsa

Tulsa Golden Hurricane
- Founded: 1948
- Defunct: 1980
- University: University of Tulsa
- Conference: MVC
- Location: Tulsa, OK
- Nickname: Golden Hurricane
- Colors: Old gold, royal blue, and crimson

College World Series runner-up
- 1969

College World Series appearances
- 1969, 1971

NCAA tournament appearances
- 1969, 1970, 1971, 1972, 1973, 1974, 1975

Conference regular season champions
- 1969, 1970, 1971, 1972, 1973, 1974, 1975

The Tulsa Golden Hurricane baseball team represented the University of Tulsa and competed in the Missouri Valley Conference of NCAA Division I. Tulsa dropped their baseball program in 1980.

== History ==
Tulsa's baseball team played in the College World Series twice, finishing in second and third place. In 1969 the Golden Hurricane made it to the final game of the double-elimination tournament before losing to Arizona State. First baseman Steve Caves and third baseman Les Rogers were named to the all-tournament team. In 1971 Tulsa lasted until the next-to-last game of the tournament before being eliminated. First baseman Jerry Tabb was named the tournament's most valuable player; pitcher Steve Rogers and outfielder Steve Bowling were also named to the all-tournament team. Tulsa held the number one ranking in the polls for part of the 1972 season before being knocked out of that year's playoffs at the district level.

Of the Tulsa baseball players who later played in the major leagues, the most successful was Steve Rogers, who pitched for 12 years with the Montreal Expos and was selected to five All-Star teams. Other Hurricanes who played in the majors included Bud Bloomfield, Steve Bowling, Mark Calvert, Mardie Cornejo, Mike Sember, and Jerry Tabb.

Tulsa dropped its baseball program in 1980, citing rising costs and the need to fund a full women's sports program. Gene Shell, who had coached the program from 1965 to 1980, finished his career at Tulsa with a 478–199 record, and was the fourth winningest coach in college baseball when the program ended. In recent years, the university has been reported on several occasions to be considering whether to restore the baseball program; a formal study was conducted in 2009 after the Tulsa Drillers moved into their new downtown stadium, leaving Drillers Stadium potentially available for college baseball, but the school concluded that the financial demands of adding a new sport were more than it could accept.

== Coaches ==
Years	Name
1948	N. A. Keithly
1949–1952	Jerry D'Arcy
1953–1955	Rogers Lehew
1956–1958	Jim Conatser
1959–1963	Gordon Morgan
1964	Al Kawal
1965	Ben Davis
1966–1980	Gene Shell
